= Maclain Way =

American documentary director, producer, editor and cinematographer

- Born: Ventura County, California, U.S.
- Occupations: Director; producer
- Years active: 2014 – present
- Relatives: Chapman Way (brother); Brocker Way (brother)

Maclain Way is an American documentary film director and producer. He is best known for producing and directing the Netflix documentary series Wild Wild Country, The Kings of Tupelo: A Southern Crime Saga, and America's Team: The Gambler and His Cowboys, and co-creating Untold.

Maclain received the Primetime Emmy Award for Outstanding Documentary or Nonfiction Series for Wild Wild Country in 2018.

== Early life and education ==
Maclain was born and raised in Ventura County, California. He attended UCLA, where he studied history and documentary film. He is a grandson of actor Bing Russell and nephew of actor Kurt Russell.

== Career ==
=== The Battered Bastards of Baseball ===
In 2014, Maclain directed and produced the documentary, The Battered Bastards of Baseball, which told the story of the Portland Mavericks, along with his brother Chapman Way. The film premiered at the 2014 Sundance Film Festival, where it was acquired and later released by Netflix as one of their first original documentary films. The documentary received the Tribeca Film Institute/ESPN prize for a documentary that “changes the way people think about sports.”

=== Wild Wild Country ===
In 2018, Maclain co-directed the six-part Netflix documentary series, Wild Wild Country. The series told the story of Rajneeshpuram, a utopian city built in the Oregon desert by the followers of Bhagwan Shree Rajneesh. The series premiered at the 2018 Sundance Film Festival, where the entire seven-hour series was screened for audiences. The series was nominated for five Primetime Emmy Awards, including Outstanding Directing for a Documentary, winning the Emmy for Outstanding Documentary or Nonfiction Series.

=== Untold (TV Series) ===
In 2021, Maclain co-created the Netflix sports series Untold, which has featured documentaries on Malice at the Palace, Danbury Trashers, Christy Martin, Johnny Manziel, Steve McNair, Mardy Fish, Manti Teʻo, And1, Hope Solo, and the 1983 America’s Cup. As of 2025, subsequent seasons of Untold have grown into collection of sports documentaries to 17 feature films, and two multi-part series. The series has been nominated twice for Outstanding Documentary Series at the 45th and 46th Sports Emmys.

=== The Kings of Tupelo: A Southern Crime Saga ===
In 2024, Maclain produced and co-directed the three-part Netflix series, The Kings of Tupelo: A Southern Crime Saga. The documentary told the events of the 2013 Ricin Letters, when an Elvis impersonator was framed for sending toxic letters to President Barack Obama, Senator Roger Wicker, and a local judge.

=== America's Team: The Gambler and His Cowboys ===
In May of 2024, it was reported that Maclain was co-directing an 8-part Netflix documentary series for Skydance Media and NFL Films, with his production company, Stardust Frames Productions. The series reportedly sold to Netflix for over $50 million and would tell the story of Jerry Jones, the owner of the Dallas Cowboys, and the team’s rise in the 1990s. America's Team: The Gambler and His Cowboys premiered in Los Angeles at the Egyptian Theater, and was later released on Netflix. The series features interviews with Jerry Jones, along with President George W. Bush, Phil Knight, Troy Aikman, Emmitt Smith, Michael Irvin, Deion Sanders, Jimmy Johnson, Steve Young, Jerry Rice and Rupert Murdoch.

=== Other Work ===
In 2024, Maclain was the executive producer on the 4-part Netflix series American Conspiracy: The Octopus Murders, which was awarded the News and Documentary Emmy for Outstanding Investigative Documentary. He produced the HBO documentary, The Lionheart, which was nominated at the 46th Sports Emmys for five categories including Outstanding Long Documentary.

== Filmography ==
Year	Title	Contribution	Note
2025	America's Team: The Gambler and His Cowboys	Director and Executive producer	Documentary series
2024	The Kings of Tupelo: A Southern Crime Saga	Director and Executive producer	Documentary series
2023	Untold: Jake Paul the Problem Child	Executive Producer	Documentary
2022	Untold: The Girlfriend Who Didn't Exist	Executive Producer	Documentary
2022	Untold: The Rise and Fall of And1	Executive Producer	Documentary
2022	Untold: Operation Flagrant Foul	Executive Producer	Documentary
2022	Untold: The Race of the Century	Director and producer	Documentary
2021	Untold: Crimes & Penalties	Director and producer	Documentary
2021	Untold: Caitlyn Jenner	Executive Producer	Documentary
2021	Untold: Deal with the Devil	Executive Producer	Documentary
2021	Untold: Breaking Point	Director and producer	Documentary
2021	Untold: Malice at the Palace	Executive Producer	Documentary
2018	Wild Wild Country	Director, sound mixer and producer	Documentary series
2016	The New Yorker Presents	Director and producer	1 episode
2014	The Battered Bastards of Baseball	Director and producer	Documentary

== Awards and nominations ==
Year	Result	Award	Category	Work	Ref.
2018	Won	International Documentary Association	Best Limited Series	Wild Wild Country	
2018	Won	Primetime Emmy Awards	Outstanding Documentary or Nonfiction Series	Wild Wild Country	
2018	Nominated	Primetime Emmy Awards	Outstanding Directing for a Documentary/Nonfiction Program	Wild Wild Country	
2019	Nominated	Cinema Eye Honors	Outstanding Achievement in Nonfiction Series for Broadcast	Wild Wild Country	
2022	Nominated	International Documentary Association	Best Episodic Series	Untold	
2022	Nominated	PromaxBDA Awards	Documentary: Program Campaign	Untold	
2024	Nominated	Cinema Eye Honors	Outstanding Achievement in Anthology Series	Untold	
2025	Nominated	Sports Emmy Awards	Outstanding Long Sports Documentary	The Lionheart	
2025	Nominated	Sports Emmy Awards	Outstanding Documentary	The Lionheart	
