= Chapman Way =

American documentary filmmaker

- Born: Ventura County, California, U.S.
- Occupations: Director; producer
- Years active: 2014 – present
- Relatives: Maclain Way (brother); Brocker Way (brother)

Chapman Way is an American documentary filmmaker. He is best known for co-creating the Netflix series Untold and for producing and directing the series Wild Wild Country, The Kings of Tupelo: A Southern Crime Saga, and America's Team: The Gambler and His Cowboys. In 2018, he won the Primetime Emmy Award for Outstanding Documentary or Nonfiction Series for Wild Wild Country.

== Early life ==
Chapman was born in Ventura County, California. He is a grandson of actor Bing Russell and nephew of actor Kurt Russell.

== Career ==
=== The Battered Bastards of Baseball ===
Chapman began his filmmaking career with The Battered Bastards of Baseball (2014), co-directed with his brother Maclain Way. The documentary explores the history of the independent Portland Mavericks baseball team and premiered at the 2014 Sundance Film Festival. It was later acquired by Netflix.

=== Wild Wild Country ===
In 2018, Chapman co-directed Wild Wild Country, a six-part Netflix series about the Rajneeshpuram community in Oregon, led by the spiritual leader Bhagwan Shree Rajneesh (Osho). The series received a Primetime Emmy Award for Outstanding Documentary or Nonfiction Series.

=== The Kings of Tupelo: A Southern Crime Saga ===
In 2024, Chapman directed and produced The Kings of Tupelo: A Southern Crime Saga, which examines the criminal underworld of Tupelo, Mississippi, centered around a notorious local figure.

=== America's Team: The Gambler and His Cowboys ===
Chapman directed and produced America's Team: The Gambler and His Cowboys, an eight-episode Netflix series chronicling Jerry Jones’ acquisition of the Dallas Cowboys and their 1990s dynasty.

=== Other Work ===
Chapman co-created and worked on the Netflix series Untold, directing episodes such as Untold: Crimes and Penalties (2021), Untold: Breaking Point (2021), and Untold: The Race of the Century (2022). He also served as an executive producer for other episodes, including Untold: Caitlyn Jenner, Untold: Malice at the Palace, Untold: Deal with the Devil, Untold: The Girlfriend Who Didn't Exist, Untold: The Rise and Fall of AND1, and Untold: Operation Flagrant Foul.

In 2016, Chapman directed a segment for Amazon’s docuseries The New Yorker Presents. In 2023, he produced the HBO documentary The Lionheart, a documentary about the life and legacy of IndyCar driver Dan Wheldon, focusing on his career and tragic death in 2011. In 2024, he served as an executive producer for American Conspiracy: The Octopus Murders and Untold: The Murder of Air McNair.

== Filmography ==
Year	Title	Contribution	Note
2014	The Battered Bastards of Baseball	Director, editor, cinematographer and producer	Documentary
2016	The New Yorker Presents	Director and producer	1 episode
2018	Wild Wild Country	Director, sound mixer and producer	Documentary series
2021	Untold: Crimes & Penalties	Director and producer	Documentary
2021	Untold: Breaking Point	Director and producer	Documentary
2021	Untold: Caitlyn Jenner	Executive Producer	Documentary
2021	Untold: Malice at the Palace	Executive Producer	Documentary
2021	Untold: Deal with the Devil	Executive Producer	Documentary
2022	Untold: The Girlfriend Who Didn't Exist	Executive Producer	Documentary
2022	Untold: The Rise and Fall of AND1	Executive Producer	Documentary
2022	Untold: Operation Flagrant Foul	Executive Producer	Documentary
2022	Untold: The Race of the Century	Director and producer	Documentary
2023	Untold: Jake Paul the Problem Child	Executive Producer	Documentary
2024	The Kings of Tupelo: A Southern Crime Saga	Director and Executive producer	Documentary series
2025	America's Team: The Gambler and His Cowboys	Director and Executive producer	Documentary series

== Awards and nominations ==
Year	Result	Award	Category	Work	Ref.
2018	Won	International Documentary Association	Best Limited Series	Wild Wild Country	
2018	Won	Primetime Emmy Awards	Outstanding Documentary or Nonfiction Series	Wild Wild Country	
2018	Nominated	Primetime Emmy Awards	Outstanding Directing for a Documentary/Nonfiction Program	Wild Wild Country	
2018	Nominated	Primetime Emmy Awards	Outstanding Sound Mixing for a Nonfiction or Reality Program	Wild Wild Country	
2019	Nominated	Cinema Eye Honors	Outstanding Achievement in Nonfiction Series for Broadcast	Wild Wild Country	
2022	Nominated	International Documentary Association	Best Episodic Series	Untold	
2022	Nominated	PromaxBDA Awards	Documentary: Program Campaign	Untold	
2024	Nominated	Cinema Eye Honors	Outstanding Achievement in Anthology Series	Untold	
2025	Nominated	Sports Emmy Awards	Outstanding Long Sports Documentary	The Lionheart	
2025	Nominated	Sports Emmy Awards	Outstanding Documentary	The Lionheart	
