= List of Netflix original films (2022) =

Netflix is an American global on-demand Internet streaming media provider, that has distributed a number of original programs, including original series, specials, miniseries, documentaries and films. Netflix's original films also include content that was first screened on cinematic release in other countries or given exclusive broadcast in other territories, and is then described as Netflix original content.

== Feature films ==
| Title | Release date | Genre | Runtime | Language |
|---|---|---|---|---|
| Four to Dinner | January 5, 2022 | Romantic comedy | 1 h 30 min | Italian |
| The Wasteland | January 6, 2022 | Horror | 1 h 32 min | Spanish |
| How I Fell in Love with a Gangster | January 12, 2022 | Drama | 2 h 59 min | Polish |
| Brazen | January 13, 2022 | Romantic thriller | 1 h 36 min | English |
| Photocopier | January 13, 2022 | Coming-of-age drama | 2 h 10 min | Indonesian |
| This Is Not a Comedy | January 14, 2022 | Comedy drama | 1 h 45 min | Spanish |
| The Royal Treatment | January 20, 2022 | Romance | 1 h 37 min | English |
| Amandla | January 21, 2022 | Drama | 1 h 46 min | English |
| Munich – The Edge of War | January 21, 2022 | Historical drama / thriller | 2 h 11 min | English |
| My Father's Violin | January 21, 2022 | Drama | 1 h 52 min | Turkish |
| Home Team | January 28, 2022 | Sports comedy | 1 h 37 min | English |
| Looop Lapeta | February 4, 2022 | Romantic thriller | 2 h 11 min | Hindi |
| Through My Window | February 4, 2022 | Drama | 1 h 53 min | Spanish |
| The Privilege | February 9, 2022 | Horror | 1 h 47 min | German |
| Into the Wind | February 10, 2022 | Romantic drama | 1 h 48 min | Polish |
| Bigbug | February 11, 2022 | Science fiction comedy | 1 h 51 min | French |
| Love and Leashes | February 11, 2022 | Romantic comedy | 1 h 58 min | Korean |
| Love Tactics | February 11, 2022 | Romantic comedy | 1 h 38 min | Turkish |
| Tall Girl 2 | February 11, 2022 | Teen romantic comedy | 1 h 41 min | English |
| Fistful of Vengeance | February 17, 2022 | Supernatural martial arts drama | 1 h 36 min | English |
| Texas Chainsaw Massacre | February 18, 2022 | Slasher | 1 h 23 min | English |
| Rabbids Invasion: Mission to Mars | February 18, 2022 | Animation / Comedy | 1 h 10 min | English |
| UFO | February 23, 2022 | Drama | 1 h 50 min | Turkish |
| A Madea Homecoming | February 25, 2022 | Comedy | 1 h 47 min | English |
| Restless | February 25, 2022 | Action thriller | 1 h 36 min | French |
| Against the Ice | March 2, 2022 | Survival | 1 h 43 min | English |
| The Weekend Away | March 3, 2022 | Thriller | 1 h 31 min | English |
| The Invisible Thread | March 4, 2022 | Comedy drama | 1 h 30 min | Italian |
| The Adam Project | March 11, 2022 | Science fiction | 1 h 46 min | English |
| Rescued by Ruby | March 17, 2022 | Drama | 1 h 33 min | English |
| Black Crab | March 18, 2022 | Thriller | 1 h 54 min | Swedish |
| Without Saying Goodbye | March 18, 2022 | Romantic comedy | 1 h 36 min | Spanish |
| Windfall | March 18, 2022 | Thriller | 1 h 32 min | English |
| In Good Hands | March 21, 2022 | Romantic comedy | 1 h 44 min | Turkish |
| Love Like the Falling Petals | March 24, 2022 | Drama | 2 h 9 min | Japanese |
| All Hail | March 30, 2022 | Drama | 1 h 58 min | Spanish |
| Apollo 10 1/2: A Space Age Childhood | April 1, 2022 | Animation | 1 h 38 min | English |
| Battle: Freestyle | April 1, 2022 | Romantic drama | 1 h 28 min | Norwegian |
| The Bubble | April 1, 2022 | Comedy | 2 h 6 min | English |
| Cobalt Blue | April 2, 2022 | Romantic drama | 1 h 52 min | Hindi |
| Dancing on Glass | April 8, 2022 | Drama | 2 h 19 min | Spanish |
| Metal Lords | April 8, 2022 | Musical comedy drama | 1 h 38 min | English |
| Yaksha: Ruthless Operations | April 8, 2022 | Spy | 2 h 5 min | Korean |
| The Taming of the Shrewd | April 13, 2022 | Comedy | 1 h 52 min | Polish |
| Choose or Die | April 15, 2022 | Horror | 1 h 25 min | English |
| Man of God | April 16, 2022 | Drama | 1 h 51 min | English |
| The Turning Point | April 20, 2022 | Drama | 1 h 30 min | Italian |
| Honeymoon with My Mother | April 22, 2022 | Comedy | 1 h 50 min | Spanish |
| 365 Days: This Day | April 27, 2022 | Erotic thriller | 1 h 51 min | English |
| Silverton Siege | April 27, 2022 | Action thriller | 1 h 41 min | English |
| Bubble | April 28, 2022 | Anime | 1 h 41 min | Japanese |
| Rumspringa – An Amish in Berlin | April 29, 2022 | Comedy | 1 h 42 min | German |
| Along for the Ride | May 6, 2022 | Drama | 1 h 47 min | English |
| The Takedown | May 6, 2022 | Action comedy | 2 h 1 min | French |
| Thar | May 6, 2022 | Western thriller | 1 h 48 min | Hindi |
| Senior Year | May 13, 2022 | Comedy | 1 h 53 min | English |
| Toscana | May 18, 2022 | Drama | 1 h 30 min | Danish |
| A Perfect Pairing | May 19, 2022 | Romantic comedy | 1 h 42 min | English |
| F*ck Love Too | May 20, 2022 | Romantic comedy | 1 h 32 min | Dutch |
| Godspeed | May 23, 2022 | Drama | 1 h 59 min | Turkish |
| Interceptor | June 3, 2022 | Action drama | 1 h 38 min | English |
| Hustle | June 8, 2022 | Sports | 1 h 58 min | English |
| Trees of Peace | June 10, 2022 | Drama | 1 h 38 min | English |
| Centauro | June 15, 2022 | Action thriller | 1 h 30 min | Spanish |
| Heart Parade | June 15, 2022 | Romantic comedy | 1 h 48 min | Polish |
| The Wrath of God | June 15, 2022 | Thriller | 1 h 38 min | Spanish |
| Spiderhead | June 17, 2022 | Science fiction action thriller | 1 h 47 min | English |
| Doom of Love | June 20, 2022 | Drama | 1 h 40 min | Turkish |
| Love & Gelato | June 22, 2022 | Romance | 1 h 52 min | English |
| Blasted | June 28, 2022 | Science fiction / comedy | 1 h 55 min | Norwegian |
| Beauty | June 29, 2022 | Drama | 1 h 35 min | English |
| Hello, Goodbye, and Everything in Between | July 6, 2022 | Romantic comedy | 1 h 24 min | English |
| Dangerous Liaisons | July 8, 2022 | Romantic drama | 1 h 49 min | French |
| Jewel | July 8, 2022 | Drama | 1 h 20 min | English |
| The Sea Beast | July 8, 2022 | CGI animation adventure | 1 h 59 min | English |
| For Jojo | July 11, 2022 | Drama | 1 h 30 min | German |
| Under the Amalfi Sun | July 13, 2022 | Comedy drama | 1 h 30 min | Italian |
| Jaadugar | July 15, 2022 | Comedy | 2 h 47 min | Hindi |
| Persuasion | July 15, 2022 | Drama | 1 h 49 min | English |
| The Gray Man | July 22, 2022 | Spy thriller | 2 h 9 min | English |
| Recurrence | July 27, 2022 | Thriller | 1 h 56 min | Spanish |
| A Cut Above | July 28, 2022 | Comedy | 1 h 31 min | Portuguese |
| The Entitled | July 29, 2022 | Romantic comedy | 1 h 30 min | Filipino |
| Purple Hearts | July 29, 2022 | Romance | 2 h 2 min | English |
| Buba | August 3, 2022 | Comedy | 1 h 34 min | German |
| Don't Blame Karma! | August 3, 2022 | Romantic comedy | 1 h 25 min | Spanish |
| Wedding Season | August 4, 2022 | Comedy | 1 h 37 min | English |
| Carter | August 5, 2022 | Action | 2 h 14 min | Korean |
| Darlings | August 5, 2022 | Comedy drama | 2 h 14 min | Hindi |
| Rise of the Teenage Mutant Ninja Turtles: The Movie | August 5, 2022 | Animated action-adventure | 1 h 22 min | English |
| Heartsong | August 10, 2022 | Romantic comedy | 1 h 35 min | Turkish |
| 13: The Musical | August 12, 2022 | Musical | 1 h 34 min | English |
| Day Shift | August 12, 2022 | Fantasy comedy | 1 h 53 min | English |
| Look Both Ways | August 17, 2022 | Romantic comedy | 1 h 51 min | English |
| Royalteen | August 17, 2022 | Coming-of-age | 1 h 48 min | Norwegian |
| The Next 365 Days | August 19, 2022 | Erotic thriller | 1 h 53 min | English |
| That's Amor | August 25, 2022 | Romantic comedy | 1 h 36 min | English |
| Loving Adults | August 26, 2022 | Thriller | 1 h 45 min | Danish |
| Me Time | August 26, 2022 | Comedy | 1 h 44 min | English |
| Seoul Vibe | August 26, 2022 | Action | 2 h 20 min | Korean |
| I Came By | August 31, 2022 | Thriller | 1 h 50 min | English |
| Fenced In | September 1, 2022 | Comedy | 1 h 50 min | Portuguese |
| Love in the Villa | September 1, 2022 | Romantic comedy | 1 h 55 min | English |
| The Festival of Troubadours | September 2, 2022 | Drama | 1 h 42 min | Turkish |
| End of the Road | September 9, 2022 | Crime thriller | 1 h 31 min | English |
| No Limit | September 9, 2022 | Thriller | 1 h 58 min | French |
| Broad Peak | September 14, 2022 | Thriller | 1 h 42 min | Polish |
| Do Revenge | September 16, 2022 | Black comedy | 1 h 58 min | English |
| Drifting Home | September 16, 2022 | Anime | 2 h | Japanese |
| I Used to Be Famous | September 16, 2022 | Musical drama | 1 h 44 min | English |
| Jogi | September 16, 2022 | Drama | 1 h 56 min | Hindi |
| The Perfumier | September 21, 2022 | Crime drama | 1 h 36 min | German |
| A Jazzman's Blues | September 23, 2022 | Drama | 2 h 8 min | English |
| Lou | September 23, 2022 | Thriller | 1 h 47 min | English |
| Athena | September 23, 2022 | Drama | 1 h 37 min | French |
| Blonde | September 28, 2022 | Biographical drama | 2 h 47 min | English |
| Aníkúlápó | September 30, 2022 | Fantasy drama | 2 h 22 min | Yoruba |
| Plan A Plan B | September 30, 2022 | Romantic comedy | 1 h 46 min | Hindi |
| Rainbow | September 30, 2022 | Fantasy drama | 1 h 58 min | Spanish |
| Jumping from High Places | October 5, 2022 | Drama | 1 h 28 min | Italian |
| Mr. Harrigan's Phone | October 5, 2022 | Horror | 1 h 46 min | English |
| Togo | October 5, 2022 | Thriller | 1 h 35 min | Spanish |
| Doll House | October 7, 2022 | Drama | 1 h 46 min | Filipino |
| Luckiest Girl Alive | October 7, 2022 | Mystery | 1 h 55 min | English |
| Old People | October 7, 2022 | Horror | 1 h 41 min | German |
| Someone Borrowed | October 11, 2022 | Romantic comedy | 1 h 47 min | Portuguese |
| The Curse of Bridge Hollow | October 14, 2022 | Comedy | 1 h 31 min | English |
| The School for Good and Evil | October 19, 2022 | Children's fantasy | 2 h 28 min | English |
| The Stranger | October 19, 2022 | Thriller | 1 h 57 min | English |
| 20th Century Girl | October 21, 2022 | Romantic | 2 h 1 min | Korean |
| Hellhole | October 26, 2022 | Horror | 1 h 30 min | Polish |
| Robbing Mussolini | October 26, 2022 | Action comedy | 1 h 30 min | Italian |
| The Good Nurse | October 26, 2022 | Drama | 2 h 3 min | English |
| Beyond the Universe | October 27, 2022 | Romantic drama | 2 h 7 min | Portuguese |
| All Quiet on the Western Front | October 28, 2022 | War drama | 2 h 28 min | German |
| Cici | October 28, 2022 | Drama | 2 h 31 min | Turkish |
| Wendell & Wild | October 28, 2022 | Stop motion fantasy horror comedy | 1 h 46 min | English |
| Wild Is the Wind | October 28, 2022 | Crime drama | 2 h 3 min | English |
| The Takeover | November 1, 2022 | Action / thriller | 1 h 28 min | Dutch |
| The Soccer Football Movie | November 9, 2022 | CGI animation sports comedy | 1 h 13 min | English |
| Falling for Christmas | November 10, 2022 | Romantic comedy | 1 h 35 min | English |
| Lost Bullet 2: Back for More | November 10, 2022 | Action | 1 h 40 min | French |
| Don't Leave | November 11, 2022 | Drama | 1 h 47 min | Turkish |
| Monica, O My Darling | November 11, 2022 | Neo-noir comedy thriller | 2 h 10 min | Hindi |
| My Father's Dragon | November 11, 2022 | Animated fantasy adventure | 1 h 43 min | English |
| The Lost Lotteries | November 16, 2022 | Comedy | 1 h 46 min | Thai |
| The Wonder | November 16, 2022 | Psychological drama | 1 h 49 min | English |
| Christmas with You | November 17, 2022 | Romantic comedy | 1 h 30 min | English |
| Slumberland | November 18, 2022 | Fantasy adventure | 2 h | English |
| Christmas on Mistletoe Farm | November 23, 2022 | Comedy | 1 h 43 min | English |
| Lesson Plan | November 23, 2022 | Crime drama | 1 h 39 min | Polish |
| The Swimmers | November 23, 2022 | Drama | 2 h 15 min | English |
| Who's a Good Boy? | November 23, 2022 | Comedy | 1 h 35 min | Spanish |
| The Noel Diary | November 24, 2022 | Drama | 1 h 40 min | English |
| A Man of Action | November 30, 2022 | Biopic | 1 h 51 min | Spanish |
| Christmas Full of Grace | November 30, 2022 | Romantic comedy | 1 h 45 min | Portuguese |
| My Name Is Vendetta | November 30, 2022 | Thriller | 1 h 30 min | Italian |
| Qala | December 1, 2022 | Drama | 1 h 59 min | Hindi |
| Troll | December 1, 2022 | Monster | 1 h 43 min | Norwegian |
| Lady Chatterley's Lover | December 2, 2022 | Romantic drama | 2 h 7 min | English |
| Scrooge: A Christmas Carol | December 2, 2022 | CGI animation musical fantasy comedy drama | 1 h 41 min | English |
| Delivery by Christmas | December 6, 2022 | Romantic comedy | 1 h 40 min | Polish |
| Burning Patience | December 7, 2022 | Drama | 1 h 30 min | Spanish |
| The Marriage App | December 7, 2022 | Drama | 1 h 41 min | Spanish |
| The Claus Family 3 | December 8, 2022 | Fantasy | 1 h 13 min | Dutch |
| Guillermo del Toro's Pinocchio | December 9, 2022 | Stop motion fantasy musical drama | 1 h 56 min | English |
| I Believe in Santa | December 14, 2022 | Romantic comedy | 1 h 30 min | English |
| The Big 4 | December 15, 2022 | Action comedy | 2 h 21 min | Indonesian |
| Bardo, False Chronicle of a Handful of Truths | December 16, 2022 | Comedy | 2 h 39 min | Spanish |
| Private Lesson | December 16, 2022 | Romantic comedy | 1 h 29 min | Turkish |
| A Not So Merry Christmas | December 20, 2022 | Comedy | 1 h 40 min | Spanish |
| Glass Onion: A Knives Out Mystery | December 23, 2022 | Murder mystery | 2 h 19 min | English |
| A Night at the Kindergarten | December 28, 2022 | Black comedy | 1 h 37 min | Polish |
| White Noise | December 30, 2022 | Black comedy | 2 h 16 min | English |

== Documentaries ==
| Title | Release date | Runtime | Language |
|---|---|---|---|
| Three Songs for Benazir | January 24, 2022 | 22 min | Pashto |
| The Tinder Swindler | February 2, 2022 | 1 h 54 min | English |
| Downfall: The Case Against Boeing | February 18, 2022 | 1 h 29 min | English |
| 11M: Terror in Madrid | February 23, 2022 | 1 h 32 min | Spanish |
| Surviving Paradise: A Family Tale | March 3, 2022 | 1 h 19 min | English |
| Broken Idol: The Undoing of Diomedes Díaz | March 30, 2022 | 1 h 42 min | Spanish |
| Trust No One: The Hunt for the Crypto King | March 30, 2022 | 1 h 30 min | English |
| Return to Space | April 7, 2022 | 2 h 8 min | English |
| White Hot: The Rise & Fall of Abercrombie & Fitch | April 19, 2022 | 1 h 28 min | English |
| The Mystery of Marilyn Monroe: The Unheard Tapes | April 27, 2022 | 1 h 41 min | English |
| Hold Your Breath: The Ice Dive | May 3, 2022 | 40 min | English |
| Our Father | May 11, 2022 | 1 h 37 min | English |
| Cyber Hell: Exposing an Internet Horror | May 18, 2022 | 1 h 45 min | Korean |
| The Photographer: Murder in Pinamar | May 19, 2022 | 1 h 46 min | Spanish |
| Gladbeck: The Hostage Crisis | June 8, 2022 | 1 h 31 min | German |
| Jennifer Lopez: Halftime | June 14, 2022 | 1 h 36 min | English |
| Sing, Dance, Act: Kabuki featuring Toma Ikuta | June 16, 2022 | 1 h 27 min | Japanese |
| The Martha Mitchell Effect | June 17, 2022 | 40 min | English |
| Civil: Ben Crump | June 19, 2022 | 1 h 41 min | English |
| Girl in the Picture | July 6, 2022 | 1 h 42 min | English |
| My Daughter's Killer | July 12, 2022 | 1 h 24 min | French |
| Never Stop Dreaming: The Life and Legacy of Shimon Peres | July 13, 2022 | 2 h 9 min | English |
| Bank Robbers: The Last Great Heist | August 10, 2022 | 1 h 50 min | Spanish |
| Stay on Board: The Leo Baker Story | August 11, 2022 | 1 h 13 min | English |
| Inside the Mind of a Cat | August 18, 2022 | 1 h 7 min | English |
| Untold: The Rise and Fall of AND1 | August 23, 2022 | 1 h 9 min | English |
| Running with the Devil: The Wild World of John McAfee | August 24, 2022 | 1 h 45 min | English |
| The Figo Affair: The Transfer that Changed Football | August 25, 2022 | 1 h 44 min | Spanish |
| Untold: Operation Flagrant Foul | August 30, 2022 | 1 h 17 min | English |
| Get Smart With Money | September 6, 2022 | 1 h 33 min | English |
| Untold: The Race of the Century | September 6, 2022 | 1 h 23 min | English |
| The Anthrax Attacks: In the Shadow of 9/11 | September 8, 2022 | 1 h 35 min | English |
| Skandal! Bringing Down Wirecard | September 16, 2022 | 1 h 33 min | English |
| The Dreamlife of Georgie Stone | September 22, 2022 | 29 min | English |
| A Trip to Infinity | September 26, 2022 | 1 h 19 min | English |
| Into the Deep: The Submarine Murder Case | September 30, 2022 | 1 h 27 min | English |
| The Trapped 13: How We Survived the Thai Cave | October 5, 2022 | 1 h 43 min | Thai |
| The Joys and Sorrows of Young Yuguo | October 6, 2022 | 28 min | English |
| The Redeem Team | October 7, 2022 | 1 h 38 min | English |
| LiSA: Another Great Day | October 18, 2022 | 1 h 37 min | Japanese |
| Descendant | October 21, 2022 | 1 h 49 min | English |
| Fugitive: The Curious Case of Carlos Ghosn | October 26, 2022 | 1 h 35 min | English |
| Orgasm Inc: The Story of OneTaste | November 5, 2022 | 1 h 29 min | English |
| State of Alabama vs. Brittany Smith | November 10, 2022 | 40 min | English |
| Capturing the Killer Nurse | November 11, 2022 | 1 h 35 min | English |
| Is That Black Enough for You?!? | November 11, 2022 | 2 h 15 min | English |
| Stutz | November 14, 2022 | 1 h 36 min | English |
| In Her Hands | November 16, 2022 | 1 h 33 min | English |
| Racionais MC's: From the Streets of São Paulo | November 16, 2022 | 1 h 56 min | Portuguese |
| I Am Vanessa Guillen | November 17, 2022 | 1 h 36 min | English |
| Ghislaine Maxwell: Filthy Rich | November 25, 2022 | 1 h 41 min | English |
| The Last Dolphin King | November 25, 2022 | 1 h 34 min | Spanish |
| Take Your Pills: Xanax | November 30, 2022 | 1 h 30 min | English |
| The Masked Scammer | December 1, 2022 | 1 h 30 min | English |
| "Sr." | December 2, 2022 | 1 h 30 min | English |
| In Broad Daylight: The Narvarte Case | December 8, 2022 | 1 h 48 min | Spanish |
| The Elephant Whisperers | December 8, 2022 | 41 min | Tamil |
| Kangaroo Valley | December 14, 2022 | 1 h 16 min | English |
| The Volcano: Rescue from Whakaari | December 16, 2022 | 1 h 38 min | English |

== Specials ==
These programs are one-time original events or supplementary content related to original films.

| Title | Release date | Genre | Runtime | Language |
|---|---|---|---|---|
| The House | January 14, 2022 | Stop motion / dark comedy | 1 h 37 min | English |
| Adam by Eve: A Live in Animation | March 15, 2022 | Animation / concert film | 58 min | Japanese |
| Celeb Five: Behind the Curtain | April 1, 2022 | Docu-comedy | 55 min | Korean |
| Oprah + Viola: A Netflix Special Event | April 22, 2022 | Interview | 48 min | English |
| Dirty Daddy: The Bob Saget Tribute | June 10, 2022 | Interview | 1 h 23 min | English |
| Dave Chappelle: What's in a Name? | July 7, 2022 | Speech | 39 min | English |
| Ivy + Bean | September 2, 2022 | Family | 57 min | English |
| Ivy + Bean: Doomed to Dance | September 2, 2022 | Family | 56 min | English |
| Ivy + Bean: The Ghost That Had to Go | September 2, 2022 | Family | 1 h 1 min | English |
| Entergalactic | September 30, 2022 | Musical drama | 1 h 32 min | English |
| Barbie: Epic Road Trip | October 25, 2022 | Animation / interactive fiction | 36 min | English |
| Making ATHENA | November 18, 2022 | Making-of | 37 min | French |
| Guillermo del Toro's Pinocchio: Handcarved Cinema | December 9, 2022 | Making-of | 30 min | English |
| The Seven Deadly Sins: Grudge of Edinburgh Part 1 | December 20, 2022 | Anime | 52 min | Japanese |
| Stuck with You | December 28, 2022 | Romantic comedy | 59 min | French |

== Shorts ==
These are programs that have a runtime of less than 20 minutes.

| Title | Release date | Genre | Runtime | Language |
|---|---|---|---|---|
| Behind the Scenes with Jane Campion | January 27, 2022 | Making-of | 17 min | English |
| Erax | February 17, 2022 | Fantasy | 15 min | English |
| Forgive Us Our Trespasses | February 17, 2022 | Drama | 14 min | English |
| Heart Shot | February 17, 2022 | Thriller | 19 min | English |
| Cat Burglar | February 22, 2022 | Animation / interactive fiction | 12 min | English |
| Nightmare of the Wolf Bestiary | August 23, 2022 | Clipshow | 11 min | English |
| Triviaverse | November 8, 2022 | Interactive fiction / quiz show | 6 min | English |
