= The Players' Tribune =

Sports journalism website providing content written by professional athletes

- Website type: Sports journalism
- Available in: English
- Owner: Minute Media
- Creator: Derek Jeter
- Website: www.theplayerstribune.com
- Launched: October 1, 2014; 11 years ago
- Current status: Active

The Players' Tribune is a new media platform that produces daily sports conversation and publishes first-person stories from professional athletes. The platform was founded by former professional Major League Baseball player Derek Jeter in 2014. Content ranges from videos to podcasts to written pieces.

== History ==
The Players' Tribune launched in October 2014 by Derek Jeter and Jaymee Messler, the chief marketing officer of Excel Sports Management, Jeter's agency, as a means for athletes to offer more direct insight into their lives. The outlet began collecting venture capital funds in 2015 and entered a "next phase" which included expanding content from the written word to include podcasts, video, and a presence on SiriusXM satellite radio. The same year, The Players' Tribune launched TPT Assist, a cause-related platform designed to allow athletes to share their philanthropic endeavors.

Messler served as the president of The Players' Tribune until leaving in January 2019. In June 2017, Jeff Levick, former Spotify Chief Revenue Officer, was named the first CEO of the company. Legendary Entertainment supplied funding as well as creative support. On June 15, 2015, it was announced that New Enterprise Associates, a venture capital firm, had invested $9.5M in The Players' Tribune. Among the attractions for the firm was the athlete ownership of the site and athlete involvement. As of October 27, 2015, after the Series B first close of $9.5 million, another $5.5 million in equities was made available to additional investors. Kobe Bryant, who had been involved with TPT since December 2014, made the largest investment in the platform and led all athletes in the round. Athletes represented by GenTrust, an investment management company, were among the athletes who invested.

As of January 19, 2017, The Players' Tribune had raised an additional $40 million in funding, bringing the total amount raised to $58 million. In 2018, The Players' Tribune purchased Unscriptd, a tech start-up which produces short-form video content. The startup began a round of layoffs shortly after.

In 2021, The Players' Tribune expanded into Brazil and Japan, partnering with NBA player Yuta Watanabe, Formula 1 driver Yuki Tsunoda, and soccer player Mana Iwabuchi in the Japanese expansion.

== Acquisition ==
In November 2019, it was announced that The Players' Tribune would be acquired by Minute Media, a digital entertainment media company that owns Mental Floss, The Big Lead, FanSided, and other digital media properties. Derek Jeter will continue to be involved in the business as a member of the Minute Media's board of directors.

== Content and platform ==
The platform's content includes first-person written stories, videos, podcasts, and photo galleries. Topics covered by the platform include mental health, athlete retirements, social justice issues, and more. As of 2018, more than 1,800 athletes, coaches and sports personalities had contributed to the site.

The content is produced in partnership between the athlete and the outlet's editorial team, with close oversight by the athlete. The vast majority of articles are written by staff at The Players' Tribune, who craft stories based on interviews conducted with the athletes. All content is approved by the athletes before it is posted, with some exercising greater control over the finished product than others. The site's former editorial director, Gary Hoenig, noted the stories are largely crafted from "monologues, with questions to nudge the conversation along," rather than a traditional interview.

Athletes such as former MLB player David Ortiz and former NBA player Kobe Bryant have used the platform to announce their retirements. Bryant's retirement announcement, titled "Dear Basketball", was turned into an Academy Award-winning short film of the same name in 2017.

Pieces from athletes have on occasion broken into mainstream media conversations, including articles by Kevin Love and Larry Sanders on mental health, Natasha Cloud on racism and social justice, and Breanna Stewart on child sexual abuse.

In addition to written pieces, the outlet also produces podcasts and videos, notably its longest running podcast, the Knuckleheads, hosted by former NBA players Quentin Richardson and Darius Miles; Truss Levelz, hosted by NFL players Cameron Jordan and Mark Ingram; and Blindsided, hosted by former NHL player Corey Hirsch and Dr. Diane McIntosh.

As of 2018, the site averages 3.4 million unique views a month in the United States, according to ComScore. Visitors to the site spend more than seven minutes per story.

== Sponsors and partnerships ==
Former CEO Jeff Levick described The Players’ Tribune revenue model as largely based around selling branded content. Several sponsors have signed a deal with The Players' Tribune. Porsche debuted as their first sponsor, as well as Powerade, Dove, Toyota, Red Bull, and Built with Chocolate Milk. The site partnered with American Family Insurance in 2016 and collaborated with the Amazon Prime Video television series Jack Ryan.

== Netflix series, Untold ==
The Players' Tribune co-produced Untold, a five-part Netflix docuseries that premiered with its first episode about the "Malice at the Palace" on August 10, 2021. Untold: The Girlfriend Who Didn't Exist chronicled the catfishing story involving Manti Te'o, Untold: Caitlyn Jenner focuses on the life and career of Caitlyn Jenner. Other episodes include the story of tennis player Mardy Fish's mental health struggles and an account of disgraced former NBA referee Tim Donaghy. Chapman Way and Maclain Way are credited as directors and co-executive producers of the series.

== Reception and criticism ==
Athletes' contributions have won praise from the sports media. The Players' Tribune has been criticized for using the practice of ghostwriting in some of its articles. "Like nearly every post on the site, the Ortiz essay was not written directly by its bylined athlete but instead crafted from a recorded interview with a Tribune staff producer," wrote Richard Sandomir, in an article for the New York Times. Richard Deitsch, a journalist who focuses on the intersection of sports and media for Sports Illustrated, described The Players’ Tribune as a "hybrid of journalism, storytelling and PR, but a really high-end combination of those three elements."

Critics have brought up questions regarding the role of traditional reporters and beat writers in sports today. Jeter responded saying "We're not trying to take away from sportswriters. Sportswriters are what makes sports successful." He added, "We're not covering day-to-day sports scores. We don't have sports highlights. This is completely different ... I think we can co-exist."

Some media outlets question the ability of The Players' Tribune to stand out in the news cycle, especially against Twitter and other social media platforms Athletes and staff have countered with defenses of the platform's purpose, with one employee noting, "This is longform social, to tell stories with content in a natural way." Responding to the notion that the site might be used to polish athlete reputations, Executive Editor Sean Conboy said, “Our most successful stories are the ones that have nothing to do with just trying to burnish the reputation of an athlete. They have something to do with them really revealing themselves and saying things they've maybe never said before.”

== Staff ==
The Executive Editor of The Players' Tribune is Sean Conboy.

Staff members
Name	Title	Sport or field
Derek Jeter	Founding Publisher	Baseball
David Ortiz	Editor at Large	Baseball
Steve Nash	Senior Producer	Basketball
Tiger Woods	Contributing Editor	Golf
Blake Griffin	Senior Editor	Basketball
Julius Thomas	Contributing Editor	Football
Kevin Love	Senior Editor	Basketball
Danica Patrick	Senior Editor	NASCAR
Russell Wilson	Senior Editor	Football
Andrew McCutchen	Senior Editor	Baseball
Walter Iooss	Photographer at Large	Photography
Matt Harvey	New York City Bureau Chief	Baseball
Jed Jacobsohn	Senior Staff Photographer	Photography
John Urschel	Advanced Stats Columnist	Football, Mathematics
Chiney Ogwumike	Chief Correspondent	Basketball
Caroline Wozniacki	Senior Editor	Tennis

== See also ==
- Dear Basketball
