= Untold: Deal with the Devil =

2021 American documentary film about Christy Salters, directed by Lisa Brownson

- Promotional poster
- Directed by: Laura Brownson
- Produced by: Chapman Way; Maclain Way; Jake Graham-Felsen; Talin Parseghian Middleton
- Starring: Christy Salters
- Cinematography: David Bolen; Adam Stone
- Edited by: Jack Price; Robert Ryang
- Music by: Brocker Way
- Production companies: The Players' Tribune; Propagate Content; Stardust Frames
- Distributed by: Netflix
- Release date: August 17, 2021
- Running time: 77 minutes
- Country: United States
- Language: English

Untold: Deal with the Devil is a 2021 American biographical documentary film made for Netflix and directed by Laura Brownson. It details the life of Christy Salters, including her career, home life, and Jim Martin's attempt to murder her. It is the second installment in the first season of the Untold documentary film series.

== Synopsis ==
Untold: Deal with the Devil documents the career and personal life of Christy Salters. (Note: While she was known as Christy Martin through most of her career, she now goes by Salters.) Raised in Mullens, West Virginia, she competed in numerous sports as a youth, and made an impression on trainers when she went into a boxing gym, as she hit harder than a number of the men. Salters began working with Jim Martin as her trainer in 1989. They were married a few years afterward, (Note: MovieMaker states they were married in 1991, but Salters stated in a piece she wrote for The Players' Tribune that it was 1992.) despite him being about twenty-five years older than her.

She subsequently competed in a series of small bouts before being picked up by Don King and fighting on the undercard at a 1996 Mike Tyson match occurring at the MGM Grand Garden Arena. Salters was catapulted into fame. King helped promote Martin and Salters as a husband-and-wife boxing team. The documentary shows how this dynamic appeared behind the spotlight, with Martin being emotionally abusive, calling Salters his "personal ATM," and convincing her that her being lesbian meant she would not be able to obtain a different manager. Salters mentions how he limited her interactions with other people.

The documentary discusses how he set up cameras throughout their home, recording everything Salters did. This includes her use of illicit drugs, which he provided to her, and the things, specifically sexual acts, he would demand she do to obtain them once she had become addicted.

The film continues, discussing the ways in which Martin would physically abuse her, especially the incidents he would claim were training accidents. It moves on to talk about the night he attempted to murder her at their home in Apopka, Florida in detail, discussing the wounds she sustained and how he shot her with her own gun before eventually walking away to shower, thinking her dead. Salters was able to escape the house and obtain medical treatment. The film goes on to detail Martin's trial and subsequent conviction. (Note: Martin was scheduled to be released in 2035, but he died in prison in November 2024.)

Salters's career afterward is also discussed, including her attempts to re-enter the boxing arena despite having a bullet still lodged inside her, as well as after a stroke. The documentary notes Salters's nonprofit organization, Christy's Champs, her efforts to spread awareness about domestic violence through public speaking engagements, and her marriage to Lisa Holewyne, also a former boxer.

== Cast ==
In alphabetical order, all as self:

- Laila Ali
- Miguel Díaz
- Deirdre Gogarty
- Lisa Holewyne
- Don King
- Sherry Lusk
- Jimmy Maloney
- Jim Martin
- Christy Salters
- Johnny Salters
- Joyce Salters
- Mike Tyson

== Production ==
The Untold series was created and produced by Chapman and Maclain Way. Their older brother, Brocker Way, composed the music for the series. Adam Stone, known for his work with Jeff Nichols, served as director of photography. The studios Propagate Content, Stardust Frames, and The Players' Tribune all contributed to production of the series.

The decision of which sports figures to include as the subjects of the first five documentaries was a result of determining who would be willing to provide a full picture of what they experienced without attempting to force an agenda or promote a specific image. An initial list of fifty subjects was narrowed down through twenty interviews. Maclain Way admitted he had not known of Salters's story prior to speaking with her.

Untold: Deal with the Devil is the second episode of the series, directed by Laura Brownson. The Way brothers stated they chose Brownson because of her ability to depict intimacy and realism. Brownson filmed several scenes with Salters in West Virginia.

The film features the first interview that Jim Martin gave after his incarceration. Salters said she had not known that he would be a part of the documentary. Martin was filmed inside a maximum security prison.

== Themes ==
Untold: Deal with the Devil discusses homophobia as well as sexual repression. The film mentions how Martin would require Salters to verbally denigrate her opponents's sexuality prior to bouts, regardless of her own sexuality. Transphobia is also included in the comments Salters makes.

Self-acceptance is also explored in the film, as is the lack of acceptance LGBTQ persons receive from their families.

Regarding gender identity and boxing, the documentary also demonstrates methods used to showcase femininity while demanding responses typically attributed to masculinity. The verbiage used to describe Salters physically often employs comparisons to stone. Yet, Salters was expected to convey traditional gender expectations. The film shows how male dominance is reinforced with high-achieving athletes. There is a specific reference to King's promotion of Salters being the same he would have provided for a male athlete, and the disappointment of the Pay-per-view announcers at having a televised "girls fight" is included as well.

The film also discusses substance misuse, as Salters had been addicted to cocaine during her career.

The documentary covers domestic violence, most especially the psychological abuse involved, including how difficult it can be to leave the abuser. Recovery is addressed in the sense of those who have been able to leave such situations needing to see themselves as survivors, as well as acknowledging that the trauma experienced will have a lifelong effect.

It shows the affect of the abuser as well, including how the abuser can use a situation in an attempt to disguise their abuse.

The documentary also shows mental health issues such as anxiety and depression.

== Critical reception ==
Reviewing the film for Ready Steady Cut, Michael Frank rated it 3.5 out of 5 stars. Frank noted that the main focus of the documentary was Salters's career and the attempted murder, which left it unable to deeply explore its broader themes of domestic violence, gender inequality, and sexuality. Frank attributes this to a lack of time. Scott Hines, writing for Decider, recommended the film, noting that the Salters's story is compelling even without any previous knowledge of her career. James Slater, writing for Boxing247.com, described the documentary as "superb" and "gripping" while also acknowledging that it was sometimes "disturbing" and "surreal."

Brian Tallerico, reviewing for RogerEbert.com, called Deal with the Devil the "most harrowing" episode of the season. Tallerico also noted that Salters's honesty about what she experienced gives the film a feeling of "personal triumph" rather than it being a "salacious true crime piece." André Hereford, writing for Metro Weekly, praised Brownson's direction in conveying the emotional situation when telling Salters's story. Hereford noted that the film does not portray Salters as a perfect person, specifically mentioning the homophobia, and was impressed with both the archival materials used and the interviews.

Ben George and Mike Noto of Distant Replay enjoyed and recommended the documentary, though they did comment that it does not adequately explain how Salters's relationship with Holewyne developed. Stephen Silver, reviewing for Tilt Magazine noted that the film is a "fine examination" of Salters, but also stated that it needed to be longer and address the addiction aspect more. Silver also expressed surprise at Tyson's support regarding Salters being a lesbian given an incident with Robert Downey Jr. on the set of Black and White. Silver commented that the documentary was not "quite as revisionist" as Untold: Malice at the Palace, but that stemmed from the fact that Salters's story was not as widely known, allowing the filmmakers to create the narrative.

Kevin McDonough, writing for the Daily Journal, stated that Tyson served as "a voice of reason" in the film. Gillian Pensavalle of True Crime Obsessed expressed outrage over Tyson's inclusion in the documentary due to his own history of rape and assault, given the domestic abuse Salters survived. Both Pensavalle and her co-host, Patrick Hinds, were impressed with how Brownson handled the interview with Martin in prison.

Javier Sardinero, writing for Cinema Gavia, enjoyed the cinematography and praised Brownson for the length and depth of subject matter, noting that the film avoids becoming too dark. Sardinero also offered praise for how the documentary addresses its themes. Jaschar Marktanner, reviewing for Film Rezensionen, appreciated the title, noting that it could apply to King, Martin, or Salters's inner struggle.

Paul Keelan of the Cinematic Underdogs podcast found the documentary "enthralling," noting that he was unaware that Martin was in prison until just before the reveal at the end. Keelan commented that the documentary utilizes archive footage of Salters on late-night talk shows that made it appear that she was "screaming for help." Keelan's co-host, Jordan Puga, enjoyed the way the documentary made it clear that boxing is a team sport. Puga also found the storytelling compelling, but felt the documentary did not address the monetary aspect of sports as completely as it could have. Puga did find that the documentary did well in portraying previously acceptable behaviors. Both Keelan and Puga recommended the film.

Mark Serrels, when reviewing the first season for CNET, stated that this episode was "expertly and sensitively told."

== See also ==
- Christy, 2025 theatrical biopic
- List of boxing films
- 2021 in film

== Sources ==
- Alejandro, Gabi; Salters, Christy (August 19, 2021). "Christy Martin, Boxer and Star of Netflix's Untold Documentary". AfterEllen (Podcast).
- Azevedo Gomes, Vivianne Limeira; Fernandes de Oliveira, Geilson (2024). "Marcas do esporte boxe feminino midiatizado: Análise a partir de "Untold – Deal With the Devil"" [Marks of Mediated Women's Boxing Sport: Analysis From "Untold – Deal With the Devil"]. Dispositiva (in Brazilian Portuguese). 13 (23): 132–149. doi:10.5752/P.2237-9967.2024v13n23p132-149.
- Bernardini, Gabrielle (August 17, 2021). "Boxing Legend Christy Martin Details Abuse From Ex-Husband in Netflix's 'Untold'". Distractify.
- Brownson, Laura; Salters, Christy (August 17, 2021). Female boxer telling her story on Netflix (Television production). KLAS-TV – via YouTube.
- Cancian, Dan (August 18, 2021). ""Untold Deal with the Devil": The story behind the Netflix show". Newsweek. Archived from the original on November 21, 2021.
- Frank, Michael (August 17, 2021). "Untold: Deal with the Devil Review - an athlete finally out of the spotlight gets her chance to tell her story". Ready Steady Cut.
- George, Ben; Noto, Mike (August 24, 2021). "Untold: Deal with the Devil - Christy Martin Netflix Documentary Recap". Distant Replay (Podcast) – via YouTube.
- Greene, Steve (September 8, 2021). "'Untold' Directors on Making Five Netflix Sports Docs Fit Together, Find Their Moment, and What's Next". IndieWire.
- Hereford, André (August 20, 2021). "Boxer-promoter Christy Salters Martin reveals the heart of a champion in "Untold: Deal with the Devil"". Metro Weekly. Archived from the original on August 20, 2021.
- Herriges, Jeremy (August 18, 2021). "Christy Martin discusses UNTOLD: Deal with the Devil". FanSided.
- Hinds, Patrick; Pensavalle, Gillian (November 9, 2021). "207: Deal with the Devil (From Netflix's 'Untold' Series)". True Crime Obsessed (Podcast) – via IHeartRadio.
- Hines, Scott (August 18, 2021). "Stream It Or Skip It: 'UNTOLD: Deal With The Devil' on Netflix, The Hard-Knocks Story of Women's Boxing Champ Christy Martin". Decider. Archived from the original on November 21, 2021.
- Keelan, Paul; Puga, Jordan (July 21, 2022). "67. Untold: Deal with the Devil". Cinematic Underdogs (Podcast).
- Landrum, Jr., Jonathan (July 20, 2021). "Netflix's 'UNTOLD' to dive deep into epic sports moments". APNews. Archived from the original on July 20, 2021.
- Lopez, Kristen (July 27, 2021). "'Untold' Trailer: 'Wild Wild Country' Directors Tackle True Sports Stories in Netflix Docuseries". IndieWire.
- Marktanner, Jaschar (August 17, 2021). "Untold: Deal with the Devil". Film Rezensionen (in German).
- Martin, Christy (August 17, 2021). "A Deal with the Devil". The Players' Tribune.
- Matteo, Genz (September 3, 2021). "Reseña de 'Untold: Deal With The Devil' de Netflix" [Review of Netflix's 'Untold: Deal With the Devil']. Lo mejor del boxeo (in Spanish).
- McDonough, Kevin (August 17, 2021). "'Deal with the Devil' on Netflix". Daily Journal. Vol. 167, no. 247. p. A6. JSTOR community.41582064.
- Pelisek, Christine (August 19, 2021). "Netflix Doc Explores Saga of Christy Salters Martin, Boxing Champ and Domestic Violence Survivor". People.
- Reid, Craig D. (December 2021). "The Legend of Christy Martin and a Deal with the Devil". Black Belt. Vol. 60, no. 1. pp. 30–32. Gale A688815196.
- Salters, Christy (August 8, 2025) [August 17, 2021]. "Boxing, fame, secret turmoil: Champion Christy Martin tells all". Queerty (Interview). Interviewed by David Reddish.
- Sardinero, Javier (August 19, 2021). ""Secretos del Deporte: Pacto con el Diablo": Asalto a asalto, de la chispa surgió la llama" ["Untold: Deal with the Devil": Round by round, the spark ignited the flame]. Cinema Gavia (in Spanish).
- Serrels, Mark (September 25, 2022). "More People Should Watch the Best Documentary Series on Netflix". CNET. Archived from the original on September 26, 2022.
- Silver, Stephen (August 17, 2021). "Untold Looks at the Story of Boxing's Christy Martin and the Hell of the Closet". Tilt Magazine. Archived from the original on September 25, 2021.
- Sippell, Margeaux (January 31, 2023) [August 19, 2021]. "Untold: Deal With the Devil: Who Is Boxing Coach Jim Martin and Where Is He Now?". MovieMaker.
- Sippell, Margeaux (January 31, 2023) [August 30, 2021]. "The Way Brothers Didn't Just Make Netflix's Untold For Sports Fans. They Made It For Everyone". MovieMaker.
- Slater, James (August 30, 2021). "Christy Salters Martin Documentary "Untold: Deal With The Devil" – As Surreal Yet Uplifting As It Gets!". Boxing247.com. Archived from the original on August 30, 2021.
- Smart, Jack (November 4, 2025). "Christy Martin Reveals She Couldn't Be in Same Room as Ben Foster, Who Played Her Abusive Ex-Husband in Biopic". People.
- Tallerico, Brian (August 8, 2021). "Netflix's Untold Deftly Reshapes Narratives Around Major Sports Stories". RogerEbert.com.
- Way, Chapman; Way, Maclain (August 11, 2021). "Chapman and Maclain Way talk Netflix "Untold" series, including "Malice at the Palace," "Crime and Penalties," "Breaking Point"". Awful Announcing (Interview). Interviewed by Andrew Bucholtz. Archived from the original on August 11, 2021.
- Way, Chapman; Way, Maclain (August 10, 2021). "Netflix's Untold Takes A Granular Look At Controversial Moments In Sports". Forbes (Interview). Interviewed by Nasha Smith. Archived from the original on August 11, 2021.
- Wong, Curtis M. (August 24, 2021). "Boxing Champ Fights Her Way To Living Truthfully In New Netflix Docuseries". HuffPost. Archived from the original on August 24, 2021.
