= The Battered Bastards of Baseball =

2014 documentary film

- Promotional poster
- Directed by: Chapman Way; Maclain Way
- Produced by: Juliana Lembi
- Cinematography: Chapman Way
- Edited by: Chapman Way
- Music by: Brocker Way
- Production company: Stardust Frames
- Distributed by: Netflix
- Release date: January 20, 2014 (Sundance)
- Running time: 73 minutes
- Country: United States
- Language: English

The Battered Bastards of Baseball is a 2014 documentary film about the Portland Mavericks, a defunct minor league baseball team in Portland, Oregon. They played five seasons in the Class A-Short Season Northwest League, from 1973 through 1977. Owned by actor Bing Russell, the Mavericks were an independent team, without the affiliation of a parent team in the major leagues. The title is from a line in Jim Bouton's 1970 book Ball Four: "Us battered bastards of baseball are the biggest customers of the U.S. Post Office, forwarding-address department."

== Development ==
The film was directed by Chapman Way and Maclain Way, grandsons of Russell, and features Russell's son Kurt Russell, who played for the Mavericks and worked as a vice president. It also includes batboy Todd Field, Frank "The Flake" Peters, Joe Garza, Jim Bouton, and Joe Garagiola. The film premiered to a standing ovation at the 2014 Sundance Film Festival on January 20, 2014. Netflix, initially one of several interested buyers, acquired the rights to the film and premiered it as an Original Documentary on July 11, 2014.

After a bidding war between Fox Searchlight, Columbia Pictures, and DreamWorks, filmmaker Justin Lin acquired the rights to adapt the documentary into a feature film. Oscar-nominated Field was attached to write and direct the adaptation.

== Reception ==
The Battered Bastards of Baseball received positive reviews from critics and has a score of 100% on Rotten Tomatoes.

Scott Foundas of Variety, said in his review that "So rife with underdog victors and hairpin twists of fortune that, if it weren't all true, no one would believe it." Duane Byrge in his review for The Hollywood Reporter praised the film by saying that "The Battered Bastards of Baseball is not just about baseball. It transcends the game and is a charming anti-establishment yarn that should delight audiences who don't even know an RBI from a balk."

Dustin Krcatovich, from Esquire, wrote "easily one of the most raucously entertaining films to come out this year, and the best sports documentary in a while." Katie Walsh of Indiewire graded the film B+ by saying that "The Batterered Bastards of Baseball is an entertaining celebration of the independent spirit and the love of the game."

The New York Daily News listed the documentary as one of the 10 best films of 2014.

== See also ==
- List of baseball films
