= Primetime Emmy Award for Outstanding Documentary or Nonfiction Series =

Primetime Emmy Award established in 2013

- Awarded for: Outstanding Documentary or Nonfiction Series
- Country: United States
- Presented by: Academy of Television Arts & Sciences
- First award: 1998
- Currently held by: Mr. Scorsese (2026)
- Website: emmys.com

The Primetime Emmy Award for Outstanding Documentary or Nonfiction Series is handed out annually at the Creative Arts Emmy Award ceremony. The award was established in 2013 as the awards restructured previous categories for Outstanding Nonfiction Series and Outstanding Nonfiction Special. The category was called Outstanding Nonfiction Series from 1998–2012. Prior to 1998, the category was called Outstanding Informational Series.

== Winners and nominations ==
=== 1990s ===
Year	Program	Producers	Network
1998 (50th)
1998 (50th)	American Experience	Judy Crichton, consulting executive producer; Margaret Drain, executive producer; David Grubin, producer/writer; Allyson Luchak, senior producer for Truman; Mark Samels, senior producer	PBS
1998 (50th)	Biography	Michael Cascio and Susan E. Leventhal, executive producers; CarolAnne Dolan, supervising producer for A&E; Diane Ferenczi, coordinating producer for A&E; Deirdre O'Hearn, producer/writer	A&E
1998 (50th)	Desmond Morris' The Human Sexes	Sandra Gregory and Michael Rosenberg, executive producers; Clive Bromhall, series producer; Clare Hargreaves, Beverley Parr, Bonni Cohen and John Longley, producers; Desmond Morris, host/writer	TLC
1998 (50th)	Discover Magazine	Suzy Geller-Wolf and David McKillop, executive producers; Evan Hadingham, co-executive producer; Nancy Dubuc, series producer; Marc Etkind, senior producer; Dan McCabe and Bob Burns, producers/directors	Discovery
1998 (50th)	Inside the Actors Studio	James Lipton, executive producer/writer/host; Frances Berwick, executive producer; Michael Kostel, John Servidio and Vienna Steiner, producers; Jeff Wurtz, director	Bravo
1999 (51st)
1999 (51st)	American Experience	Margaret Drain, executive producer; Mark Samels, senior producer; Austin Hoyt, producer	PBS
1999 (51st)	American Masters	Susan Lacy, executive producer; Tamar Hacker, senior producer	PBS
1999 (51st)	The Awful Truth	Michael Moore and Kathleen Glynn, executive producers; Dave Hamilton, supervising producer; Tia Lessin, senior producer; Ellin Baumel, producer; Annie Cohen, head writer; Francis Gasparini, Jay Martel, Nick McKinney and Henriette Mantel, writers	Bravo
1999 (51st)	Biography	Michael Cascio and Peter Jones, executive producers; CarolAnne Dolan, supervising producer	A&E
1999 (51st)	Inside the Actors Studio	James Lipton, executive producer/writer/host; Vienna Steiner and Frances Berwick, executive producers; Michael Kostel, Eileen Lanci and John Servidio, producers; Jeff Wurtz, director	Bravo

=== 2000s ===
Year	Program	Producers	Network
2000 (52nd)
2000 (52nd)	American Masters	Susan Lacy, executive producer; Tamar Hacker, senior producer; Michael Epstein, producer/writer/director; Karen Bernstein, producer	PBS
2000 (52nd)	Behind the Music	Jeff Gaspin, Gay Rosenthal and George Moll, executive producers; Paul Gallagher, supervising producer; Susan Biesack, Victoria Zielinski and Paul Barrosse, producers	VH1
2000 (52nd)	Biography	CarolAnne Dolan, executive producer; Maryellen Cox, supervising producer	A&E
2000 (52nd)	Inside the Actors Studio	James Lipton, executive producer/writer/host; Frances Berwick, Christian Barcellos and Vienna Steiner, executive producers; Michael Kostel and John Servidio, producers; Jeff Wurtz, director	Bravo
2000 (52nd)	New York: A Documentary Film	Ric Burns, executive producer/director/writer; Lisa Ades, producer/co-director; Margaret Drain, executive producer for American Experience; Judy Crichton, executive producer for WGBH; Mark Samels, producer for American Experience; James Sanders, writer	PBS
2001 (53rd)
2001 (53rd)	American Masters	Susan Lacy, executive producer; Pamela Mason Wagner, producer/director; Thomas Wagner, producer/writer; Tamar Hacker, producer	PBS
2001 (53rd)	Behind the Music	George Moll, Jeff Gaspin and Gay Rosenthal, executive producers; Paul Gallagher and Paul Barrosse, supervising producers; Allie Brown Torgan, producer	VH1
2001 (53rd)	Biography	CarolAnne Dolan and Susan E. Leventhal, executive producers; Maryellen Cox, supervising producer; Jonathan Talmadge, producer; Harry Smith, host	A&E
2001 (53rd)	Inside the Actors Studio	James Lipton, executive producer/writer/host; Frances Berwick, Christian Barcellos and Vienna Steiner, executive producers for Bravo; Michael Kostel and John Servidio, producers; Jeff Wurtz, director	Bravo
2001 (53rd)	Jazz	Ken Burns, producer/director; Lynn Novick, producer; Geoffrey C. Ward, writer; Keith David, narrator	PBS
2002 (54th)
2002 (54th)	Biography	CarolAnne Dolan and Kevin Burns, executive producers; Maryellen Cox and Kerry Jensen, supervising producers; Jeanne Begley, producer/director; Gidion Phillips, writer	A&E
2002 (54th)	Antiques Roadshow	Peter B. Cook, executive producer; Marsha Bemko, senior producer	PBS
2002 (54th)	Behind the Music	George Moll and Paul Gallagher, executive producers; Justin Sturken, senior series producer; Mark Ford, producer	VH1
2002 (54th)	E! True Hollywood Story	Jeffrey Shore, executive producer; Mark Harris, supervising producer; Eric Shepard, producer	E!
2002 (54th)	Inside the Actors Studio	James Lipton, executive producer/writer/host; Christian Barcellos and Frances Berwick, executive producers for Bravo; Michael Kostel and John Servidio, producers; Jeff Wurtz, director	Bravo
2003 (55th)
2003 (55th)	American Masters	Susan Lacy, executive producer; Julie Sacks, supervising producer; Prudence Glass, series producer; Anne Makepeace, producer	PBS
2003 (55th)	Behind the Music	George Moll, Paul Gallagher and Justin Sturken, executive producers; Mark Ford, senior producer; Erica Hanson, producer	VH1
2003 (55th)	Biography	Adam Friedman, Bill Evashwick, CarolAnne Dolan and Maryellen Cox, executive producers; Iain Kennedy and Catherine Dyer, supervising producers	A&E
2003 (55th)	E! True Hollywood Story	Mark Jonathan Harris, executive producer; Andreas Kanonenberg, supervising producer; Michael Lynn, producer	E!
2003 (55th)	Inside the Actors Studio	James Lipton, executive producer/host; Christian Barcellos and Frances Berwick, executive producers for Bravo; Michael Kostel and John Servidio, producers	Bravo
2004 (56th)
2004 (56th)	American Masters	Susan Lacy, Roger Mayer and George Feltenstein, executive producers; Julie Sacks, supervising producer; Prudence Glass, series producer; John Fricke, producer	PBS
2004 (56th)	Biography	Joe Townley and Dierdre O'Hearn, executive producers; Maro Chermayeff, supervising producer; Steven Hilliard Stern and Eliza Kurtz, producers	A&E
2004 (56th)	Cold Case Files	Laura Fleury, executive producer; Michael Harvey, supervising producer; Mike West, producer; Bill Kurtis, host	A&E
2004 (56th)	Inside the Actors Studio	Frances Berwick and Christian Barcellos, executive producers for Bravo; James Lipton, producer/host; Alice Siess, John Servidio and Michael Kostel, producers	Bravo
2004 (56th)	The Soul of a Man	Martin Scorsese, Paul G. Allen, Jody Allen, Ulrich Felsberg and Peter Schwartzkopff, executive producers; Alex Gibney, series producer; Margaret Bodde, producer	PBS
2005 (57th)
2005 (57th)	Broadway: The American Musical	David Horn and Jac Venza, executive producers; Bill O'Donnell, supervising producer; Michael Kantor, Jeff Dupre and Sally Rosenthal, producers; Julie Andrews, host	PBS
2005 (57th)	Biography	Craig Haffner, Donna E. Lusitana and Dierdre O'Hearn, executive producers; Rhys Thomas and Jeff Hasler, executive producers; Darryl Rehr, produced by	A&E
2005 (57th)	Cold Case Files	Michael Harvey and Laura Fleury, executive producers; Tania Lindsay and Mike West, supervising producers; Mary Frances O'Conner, producer; Bill Kurtis, host	A&E
2005 (57th)	Dinner for Five	Alison Palmer Bourke, Evan Shapiro and Jon Favreau, executive producers; Peter Billingsley and Lisa Tauger, co-executive producer; Chris Donovan, producer	IFC
2005 (57th)	Inside the Actors Studio	James Lipton, executive producer/host; Frances Berwick and Christian Barcellos, executive producers for Bravo; Sabrina Fodor, Jeff Wurtz and Alice Siess, producers	Bravo
2006 (58th)
2006 (58th)	10 Days That Unexpectedly Changed America	Susan Werbe, executive producer; Joe Berlinger, co-executive producer; Sidney Beaumont and Greg Schultz, supervising producers	History
2006 (58th)	American Masters	Susan Lacy, executive producer; Prudence Glass, series producer; Julie Sacks, supervising producer; Jeff Rosen, Martin Scorsese, Nigel Sinclair and Anthony Wall, producers	PBS
2006 (58th)	Biography	Kevin Burns, executive producer; Dierdre O'Hearn, executive producer for A&E; Kim Sheerin, co-executive producer; Steven Smith, supervising producer; Gary Simson, producer	A&E
2006 (58th)	Deadliest Catch	David McKillop and Thom Beers, executive producers; Tracy Green, co-executive producer; Jeff Conroy, supervising producer; Nathanial Havholm, Doug Stanley, Todd Stanley, Patrick Costello, Monica Martino, Chris Nee, Johnny Petillo, Ethan Prochnik, Brian Lovett and Larry Law, producers	Discovery
2006 (58th)	Inside the Actors Studio	James Lipton, Frances Berwick and Christian Barcellos, executive producers; Sabrina Fodor and Jeff Wurtz, produced by	Bravo
2007 (59th)
2007 (59th)	Planet Earth	Maureen Lemire, executive producer; Alastair Fothergill, series producer; Mark Linfield, producer	Discovery
2007 (59th)	American Masters	Susan Lacy, executive producer for American Masters; Prudence Glass, series producer for American Masters; Julie Sacks, supervising producer for American Masters; Peter Brant, Larry Gagosian and Diane von Fürstenberg, executive producers; Donald Rosenfeld, Daniel Wolf and Ric Burns, produced by	PBS
2007 (59th)	Biography	Kevin Burns, executive producer; Dierdre O'Hearn, executive producer for A&E; Kim Sheerin, co-executive producer; Steven Smith, supervising producer; Andrew Berg, supervising producer for A&E; David Silver and Rick Hull, producers; Dave Hoffman, narrator	A&E
2007 (59th)	Deadliest Catch	Thom Beers, executive producer; Paul Gasek, executive producer for Discovery Channel; Jeff Conroy, co-executive producer; Lisa Tanzer, supervising producer; Ethan Prochnik, senior producer; Tim Pastore, Matt Renner, Kyle Wheeler, Christian Skovly, Todd Stanley, Cameron Glendenning, Zac McFarlane, Doug Stanley and Kelly Coskran, producers	Discovery
2007 (59th)	Inside the Actors Studio	James Lipton, executive producer/host; Frances Berwick and Christian Barcellos, executive producers; Sabrina Fodor and Jeff Wurtz, produced by	Bravo
2008 (60th)
2008 (60th)	American Masters	Susan Lacy, executive producer; Prudence Glass, series producer; Julie Sacks, supervising producer; Jim Brown, Michael Cohl and William Eigen, produced by	PBS
2008 (60th)	This American Life	Producing Team	Showtime
2008 (60th)	Biography	Gregory Hall, executive producer; Peter Tarshis, executive producer for Biography Channel; Barbara Hall, producer	Biography
2008 (60th)	Deadliest Catch	Thom Beers and Paul Gasek, executive producers; Jeff Conroy and Tracy Rudolph, co-executive producers; Matt Renner, series producer; Lisa Tanzer, supervising producer; Ethan Prochnik, senior producer	Discovery
2008 (60th)	Inside the Actors Studio	James Lipton, Frances Berwick and Christian Barcellos, executive producers; Sabrina Fodor and Jeff Wurtz, produced by	Bravo
2009 (61st)
2009 (61st)	American Masters	Susan Lacy, executive producer; Prudence Glass, series producer; Julie Sacks, supervising producer; Judy Kinberg, producer	PBS
2009 (61st)	American Experience	Mark Samels and Nick Fraser, executive producers; Susan Bellows, series producer; David Grubin, produced by; Sharon Grimberg, senior producer	PBS
2009 (61st)	Anthony Bourdain: No Reservations	Myleeta Aga, Christopher Collins and Lydia Tenaglia, executive producers; Paul Cabana, producer	Travel
2009 (61st)	Biography	Gary Cohen and Peter Tarshis, executive producers; Eliza Kurtz, producer	Bio
2009 (61st)	Deadliest Catch	Thom Beers, Jeff Conroy, Paul Gasek and Tracy Rudolph, executive producers; Matt Renner, co-executive producer; Ethan Prochnik, supervising producer	Discovery
2009 (61st)	This American Life	Producing Team	Showtime

=== 2010s ===
Year	Program	Producers	Network
2010 (62nd)
2010 (62nd)	The National Parks: America's Best Idea	Ken Burns and Dayton Duncan, produced by	PBS
2010 (62nd)	American Experience	Mark Samels, executive producer; Sharon Grimberg, senior producer; Susan Bellows, series producer; Ric Burns, Mary Recine, Bonnie Lafave and Robin Espinola, produced by	PBS
2010 (62nd)	American Masters	Susan Lacy, executive producer; Prudence Glass, series producer; Julie Sacks, supervising producer; John Beug, Jeff Jampol and Dick Wolf, producers; Peter Jankowski, produced by	PBS
2010 (62nd)	Deadliest Catch	Thom Beers and Jeff Conroy, executive producers; Paul Gasek and Tracy Rudolph, executive producers for Discovery Channel; Matt Renner, co-executive producer; Ethan Prochnik, supervising producer; Eric Lange, producer	Discovery
2010 (62nd)	Life	Catherine McCarthy, executive producer for BBC; Michael Gunton, executive producer; Susan Winslow and Paul Spillenger, producers for Discovery Channel; Martha Holmes, series producer	Discovery
2010 (62nd)	Monty Python: Almost the Truth (Lawyers Cut)	Harold Gronenthal, George Lentz Jr. and Christine Lubrano, executive producers for IFC; Andrew Winter, supervising producer; Bill Jones, and Ben Timlett, series producers	IFC
2011 (63rd)
2011 (63rd)	American Masters	Susan Lacy, Stanley F. Buchthal and Michael Cohl, executive producers; Prudence Glass, series producer; Julie Sacks, supervising producer; Michael Epstein and Jessica Levin, producers	PBS
2011 (63rd)	Anthony Bourdain: No Reservations	Lydia Tenaglia and Christopher Collins, executive producers; Anthony Bourdain, executive producer/host; Stone Roberts, executive producer for Travel Channel	Travel
2011 (63rd)	Biography	Judith Belushi-Pisano, executive producer; Peter Tarshis and Thomas Moody, executive producers for Bio; Kevin Bachar, executive producer for Pangolin Pictures; Amelia Hanibelsz, supervising producer; Joey Allen and Rob Goldberg, producers	Bio
2011 (63rd)	Moguls & Movie Stars	Bill Haber, executive producer; Jon Wilkman, produced by	TCM
2011 (63rd)	Pioneers of Television	Mike Trinklein and Steve Boettcher, producers	PBS
2011 (63rd)	30 for 30	John Dahl, Connor Schell, Bill Simmons, Joan Lynch, John Skipper, John Walsh and Keith Clinkscales, executive producers	ESPN
2012 (64th)
2012 (64th)	Frozen Planet	Alastair Fothergill and Susan Winslow, executive producers; Vanessa Berlowitz, series producer	Discovery
2012 (64th)	Woody Allen: A Documentary	Susan Lacy, executive producer for American Masters; Erik Gordon, Andrew S. Karsch, Michael Peyser, Brett Ratner and Fisher Stevens, executive producers; Robert B. Weide, producer	PBS
2012 (64th)	Anthony Bourdain: No Reservations	Christopher Collins, Lydia Tenaglia, Anthony Bourdain, Sandra Zweig and Stone Roberts, executive producers; Tom Vitale, producer	Travel
2012 (64th)	Inside the Actors Studio	James Lipton, Frances Berwick and Christian Barcellos, executive producers; Shawn Tesser and Jeff Wurtz, producers	Bravo
2012 (64th)	The Weight of the Nation	Sheila Nevins and John Hoffman, executive producers; Dan Chaykin and Sarah Teale, producers	HBO
2013 (65th)
2013 (65th)	American Masters	Susan Lacy, executive producer; Julie Sacks, supervising producer; Prudence Glass, series producer; Jessica Levin, produced by	PBS
2013 (65th)	The Abolitionists	Sharon Grimberg and Mark Samels, executive producers; Rob Rapley, produced by	PBS
2013 (65th)	The Men Who Built America	Stephen David, Dirk Hoogstra, Russell McCarroll and Paul Cabana, executive producers; Tim W. Kelly, co-executive producer; Randy Counsman, producer; David C. White, series producer	History
2013 (65th)	Through the Wormhole	Producing Team	Science
2013 (65th)	Vice	Bill Maher, Shane Smith and Eddy Moretti, executive producers; Bradley J. Levin, co-executive producer; Jonah Kaplan, senior producer; Jason Mojica and Brendan Fitzgerald, producers	HBO
2014 (66th)
2014 (66th)	American Masters	Susan Lacy, executive producer; Julie Sacks, series producer; Junko Tsunashima, supervising producer; Dori Berinstein, produced by	PBS
2014 (66th)	Years of Living Dangerously (Season 1)	Joel Bach, David Gelber, Daniel Abbasi, James Cameron, Jerry Weintraub and Arnold Schwarzenegger, executive producers; Solly Granatstein, co-executive producer; Jennifer Latham, supervising producer; Adam Bolt, senior producer; Jacob Kornbluth, producer	Showtime
2014 (66th)	Cosmos: A Spacetime Odyssey	Ann Druyan, Seth MacFarlane, Mitchell Cannold and Brannon Braga, executive producers; Jason Clark, co-executive producer; Livia Hanich and Steven Holtzman, producers; Neil deGrasse Tyson, host	Fox
2014 (66th)	Pioneers of Television	Mike Trinklein and Steve Boettcher, producers	PBS
2014 (66th)	The World Wars	Stephen David, Russell McCarroll, Paul Cabana and Elaine Frontain Bryant, executive producers; Tim W. Kelly, co-executive producer; David C. White, series producer; Shirley Escott, series producer	History
2015 (67th)
2015 (67th)	The Jinx: The Life and Deaths of Robert Durst	Jason Blum, executive producer; Zachary Stuart-Pontier, cp-executive producer; Marc Smerling and Andrew Jarecki, producers	HBO
2015 (67th)	American Masters	Susan Lacy and Michael Kantor, executive producers; Junko Tsunashima, supervising producer; Julie Sacks, series producer; Robert Trachtenberg, produced by	PBS
2015 (67th)	Cancer: The Emperor of All Maladies	Ken Burns, Dalton Delan, David S. Thompson, Pamela Oas Williams and Laura Ziskin, executive producers; Barak Goodman, series producer	PBS
2015 (67th)	The Roosevelts: An Intimate History	Ken Burns, Paul Barnes and Pam Tubridy Baucom, produced by	PBS
2015 (67th)	The Sixties	Tom Hanks, Gary Goetzman and Mark Herzog, executive producers; Christopher G. Cowen and Kirk Saduski, co-executive producers; Dan Partland, supervising producer; Stephen J. Morrison, producer	CNN
2016 (68th)
2016 (68th)	Making a Murderer (Season 1)	Laura Ricciardi and Moira Demos, executive producers	Netflix
2016 (68th)	American Masters	Michael Kantor, executive producer; Junko Tsunashima, supervising producer; Julie Sacks, series producer; Julian Schlossberg, produced by	PBS
2016 (68th)	Chef's Table	David Gelb, Andrew Fried, Brian McGinn, Matthew Weaver and Dane Lillegard, executive producers	Netflix
2016 (68th)	The Seventies	Tom Hanks, Gary Goetzman and Mark Herzog, executive producers; Christopher G. Cowen and Kirk Saduski, co-executive producers; David Rivera, series producer; Stephen J. Morrison, producer	CNN
2016 (68th)	Woman with Gloria Steinem	Amy Richards, Gloria Steinem, Nomi Ernst Leidner, Ariel Wengroff and Shane Smith, executive producers; Joanna Forscher, co-executive producer	Viceland
2017 (69th)
2017 (69th)	Planet Earth II	Michael Gunton, executive producer; Tom Hugh-Jones, series producer; Elizabeth White, produced by	BBC America
2017 (69th)	American Masters	Michael Kantor, executive producer; Junko Tsunashima, supervising producer; Julie Sacks, series producer; Suzanne Hillinger and Brent Miller, producers	PBS
2017 (69th)	Chef's Table	David Gelb, Andrew Fried, Brian McGinn and Matthew Weaver, executive producers; Dane Lillegard, co-executive producer	Netflix
2017 (69th)	The Keepers	Jessica Hargrave, Ryan White and Josh Braun, executive producers; Matthew Goldberg and Brandon Carroll, co-executive producers	Netflix
2017 (69th)	30 for 30	Connor Schell, John Dahl, Libby Geist, Judd Apatow, Michael Bonfiglio and Dave O'Connor, executive producers; Jenna Anthony, produced by	ESPN
2018 (70th)
2018 (70th)	Wild Wild Country	Mark Duplass, Jay Duplass, Josh Braun and Dan Braun, executive producers; Juliana Lembi, produced by; Chapman Way and Maclain Way, producers	Netflix
2018 (70th)	American Masters	Michael Kantor and Chiz Schultz, executive producers; Junko Tsunashima, supervising producer; Julie Sacks, series producer; Tracy Heather Strain and Randall MacLowry, produced by	PBS
2018 (70th)	Blue Planet II	James Honeyborne, executive producer; Mark Brownlow, series producer; Jonathan Smith, produced by	BBC America
2018 (70th)	The Defiant Ones	Allen Hughes and Doug Pray, executive producers	HBO
2018 (70th)	The Fourth Estate	Vinnie Malhotra, David Sirulnick and Dan Cogan, executive producers; Lisa Diamond, supervising producer; Liz Garbus, Jenny Carchman and Justin Wilkes, produced by	Showtime
2019 (71st)
2019 (71st)	Our Planet	Sophie Lanfear, produced by; Alastair Fothergill and Keith Scholey, series producers	Netflix
2019 (71st)	American Masters	Michael Kantor, producer/executive producer; Sally Rosenthal, producer; Julie Sacks, series producer; Junko Tsunashima, supervising producer	PBS
2019 (71st)	Chef's Table	Matthew Weaver, Brian McGinn, Andrew Fried and David Gelb, executive producers; Dane Lillegard, co-executive producer	Netflix
2019 (71st)	Hostile Planet	Guillermo Navarro, Martha Holmes, Grant Mansfield, Bear Grylls, Kevin Tao Mohs and Tim Pastore, executive producers; Tom Hugh-Jones, series producer	Nat Geo
2019 (71st)	30 for 30	Philip Aromando, produced by; Connor Schell, John Dahl, Libby Geist, Rob King and Jonathan Hock, executive producers; Erin Leyden, senior producer	ESPN

=== 2020s ===
Year	Program	Producers	Network
2020 (72nd)
2020 (72nd)	The Last Dance	Jason Hehir, produced by; Mike Tollin, Estee Portnoy, Curtis Polk, Connor Schell, Gregg Winik and Andrew Thompson, executive producers	ESPN
2020 (72nd)	American Masters	Michael Kantor, Jay Alix, Una Jackman and Suzi Dietz, executive producers; Julie Sacks, series producer; Jeff Kaufman and Marcia S. Ross, producers	PBS
2020 (72nd)	Hillary	Ben Silverman, Howard T. Owens and Nanette Burstein, executive producers; Timothy Moran, Chi-Young Park and Tal Ben-David, producers; Isabel San Vargas, produced by	Hulu
2020 (72nd)	McMillion$	Mark Wahlberg, Stephen Levinson, Archie Gips, James Lee Hernandez, Brian Lazarte, Nancy Abraham and Lisa Heller, executive producers	HBO
2020 (72nd)	Tiger King: Murder, Mayhem and Madness	Chris Smith, Fisher Stevens, Eric Goode and Rebecca Chaiklin, executive producers	Netflix
2021 (73rd)
2021 (73rd)	Secrets of the Whales	James Cameron, Maria Wilhelm, Shannon Malone-deBenedictis and Pamela Caragol, executive producers; Kevin Krug, Sam Legrys and Brian Skerry, producers	Disney+
2021 (73rd)	Allen v. Farrow	Amy Ziering, Kirby Dick, Dan Cogan, Lisa Heller, Nancy Abraham and Tara Lynda Guber, executive producers; Amy Herdy and Jamie Rogers, producers; Sara Rodriguez, senior producer	HBO
2021 (73rd)	American Masters	Michael Kantor, Alicia Keys, Lacey Schwartz Delgado, Mehret Mandefro, Elliott Halpern and Elizabeth Trojian, executive producers; Julie Sacks, series producer	PBS
2021 (73rd)	City So Real	Diane Weyermann, Alex Kotlowitz, Gordon Quinn and Jolene Pinder, executive producers; Steve James and Zak Piper, produced by	Nat Geo
2021 (73rd)	Pretend It's a City	Martin Scorsese, Fran Lebowitz, David Tedeschi, Ted Griffin, Emma Tillinger Koskoff, Joshua Porter and Margaret Bodde, executive producers	Netflix
2022 (74th)
2022 (74th)	The Beatles: Get Back	Paul McCartney, Ringo Starr, Yoko Ono Lennon and Olivia Harrison, producers; Peter Jackson, Clare Olssen and Jonathan Clyde, produced by	Disney+
2022 (74th)	The Andy Warhol Diaries	Ryan Murphy, Andrew Rossi, Josh Braun, Alexis Martin Woodall and Stanley Buchthal, executive producers; Daniel Braun and Stacey Reiss, co-executive producers; Maya E. Rudolph, producer	Netflix
2022 (74th)	jeen-yuhs: A Kanye Trilogy	Ian Orefice, Rebecca Teitel, Alexa Conway, Kevin Thomson, Connor Schell, Mike Beck, Gee Roberson and Free Maiden, executive producers; Coodie Simmons, Chike Ozah and Leah Natasha Thomas, produced by; Marjorie Clarke, producer	Netflix
2022 (74th)	100 Foot Wave (Season 1)	Joe Lewis, Chris Smith, Maria Zuckerman, Ryan Heller, Nancy Abraham and Lisa Heller, executive producers; Bentley Weiner, senior producer	HBO
2022 (74th)	We Need to Talk About Cosby	W. Kamau Bell, Andrew Fried, Katie A King, Vinnie Malhotra, Dane Lillegard, Sarina Roma and Jordan Wynn, executive producers; Geraldine L. Porras, co-executive producer; Erik Adolphson, supervising producer	Showtime
2023 (75th)
2023 (75th)	The 1619 Project	Nikole Hannah-Jones, Roger Ross Williams, Shoshana Guy, Caitlin Roper, Kathleen Lingo, Helen Verno and Oprah Winfrey, executive producers; Geoff Martz and Carla Gardini, co-executive producers; Jonathan Clasberry, producer	Hulu
2023 (75th)	Dear Mama	Lasse Järvi, Nelson George, Peter Nelson, Jamal Joseph, Ted Skillman and Allen Hughes, executive producers; Stef Smith, produced by; Loren Gomez, Joshua Garcia and James Jenkins, producers	FX
2023 (75th)	100 Foot Wave (Season 2)	Maria Zuckerman, Ryan Heller, Joe Lewis, Chris Smith, Nancy Abraham, Lisa Heller and Bentley Weiner, executive producers	HBO
2023 (75th)	Secrets of the Elephants	James Cameron, Maria Wilhelm, Pamela Caragol, Lucinda Axelsson and Caroline Hawkins, executive producers; Jonathan Frisby, series producer; Dr. Paula Kahumbu and Kim Butts, producers	Nat Geo
2023 (75th)	The U.S. and the Holocaust	Sarah Botstein, Lynn Novick, Ken Burns and Mike Welt, produced by	PBS
2024 (76th)
2024 (76th)	Beckham	David Gardner and Gary Neville, executive producers; Jonathan Sides and Craig South, co-executive producers; John Battsek, Nicola Howson, Fisher Stevens and Billie Shepherd, produced by	Netflix
2024 (76th)	The Jinx — Part Two	Andrew Jarecki, Zac Stuart-Pontier, Kyle Martin, Nancy Abraham, Lisa Heller and Sara Rodriguez, executive producers; Charlotte Kaufman and Sam Neave, producers	HBO
2024 (76th)	Quiet on Set: The Dark Side of Kids TV	Mary Robertson, Eli Holzman, Aaron Saidman, Nicholas Carlson, Kate Taylor, Joel Stonington and Pamela E. Deutsch, executive producers; Emma Schwartz and Lisa Kalikow, co-executive producers; Meredith Russell, producer	ID
2024 (76th)	Stax: Soulsville U.S.A.	Ezra Edelman, Caroline Waterlow, Nigel Sinclair, Nicholas Ferrall, Michele Smith, Sophia Dilley, David Blackman and Tina Nguyen, executive producers; Jamila Wignot and Kara Elverson, produced by	HBO
2024 (76th)	Telemarketers	Adam Bhala Lough, Sam Lipman-Stern, Benny Safdie, Josh Safdie, Dani Bernfeld, Danny McBride, Nancy Abraham, Lisa Heller and Tina Nguyen, executive producers; Claire Read, produced by	HBO
2025 (77th)
2025 (77th)	100 Foot Wave (Season 3)	Ryan Heller, Michael Bloom, Maria Zuckerman, Zach Rothfeld, Joe Lewis, Chris Smith, Nancy Abraham, Lisa Heller and Bentley Weiner, executive producers; Vincent Kardasik, producer	HBO
2025 (77th)	Chef's Table (Season 7)	David Gelb, Andrew Fried, Brian McGinn and Danny O'Malley, executive producers; Dane Lillegard, co-executive producer; Andrew Lloyd Bank, Michael Hilliard, Drew Palombi and Talin P. Middleton, producers	Netflix
2025 (77th)	Simone Biles Rising	Gotham Chopra, Giselle Parets, Ameeth Sankaran, Janey Miller, Yiannis Exarchos, JT Taylor, Katie Walsh, Jérôme Parmentier and David Herren, executive producers; Jemele Hill, producer	Netflix
2025 (77th)	SNL50: Beyond Saturday Night	Morgan Neville, Caitrin Rogers and Juaquin Cambron, executive producers; Nora Chute, supervising producer; Jonathan Formica and Allison Klein, producers; Darling Higgins and Zach Greenspan, line producers	Peacock
2025 (77th)	Social Studies	Lauren Greenfield and Frank Evers, executive producers/produced by; Wallis Annenberg, Regina K. Scully, Andrea Van Beuren and Caryn Capotosto, executive producers; Julie Frankel, supervising producer; Jennifer Kobzik, line producer	FX
2026 (78th)
2026 (78th)	Mr. Scorsese	Damon Cardasis, Cindy Tolan, Rebecca Miller, Rick Yorn, Christopher Donnelly and Julie Yorn, executive producers; Robert Fernandez and Patrick Walmsley, co-executive producers; Ron Burkle, producer	Apple TV
2026 (78th)	The American Revolution	Sarah Botstein, David Schmidt, Salimah El-Amin and Ken Burns, produced by	PBS
2026 (78th)	Rafa	Zach Heinzerling, David Ellison, Jesse Sisgold, Jon Weinbach, Benito Perez-Barbadillo and Dan Marks, executive producers; Tamara Rosenberg, co-executive producer; Andrew Helms, Timothy Moran and Connie Honeycutt, producers	Netflix
2026 (78th)	Sean Combs: The Reckoning	Curtis "50 Cent" Jackson, Alexandria Stapleton, Stacy Scripter, David Karabinas, Ariel Brozell and Brad Bernstein, executive producers; Megan Goedewaagen, co-executive producer; Vanessa Sanchez, supervising producer	Netflix
2026 (78th)	The Yogurt Shop Murders	Margaret Brown, Nicole Stott, Emily Osborne, Emma Stone, Dave McCary, Mickey Stanley, Beth Garrabrant and Ali Herting, executive producers; Alice Henty, produced by; Michael Bloch, producer	HBO

== Programs with multiple wins ==
10 wins

- American Masters

2 wins

- American Experience
- Planet Earth

== Producers with multiple wins ==
10 wins

- Susan Lacy

7 wins

- Julie Sacks

6 wins

- Prudence Glass

3 wins

- Alastair Fothergill
- Tamar Hacker

2 wins

- James Cameron
- Michael Cohl
- Margaret Drain
- Michael Epstein
- Jessica Levin
- Mark Samels

== Programs with multiple nominations ==
20 nominations

- American Masters

15 nominations

- Biography (Note: The nomination total for Biography includes two nominations for Outstanding Informational Series in 1996 and 1997.)

13 nominations

- Inside the Actors Studio (Note: Inside the Actors Studio moved in 2013 to Outstanding Informational Series or Special. The nomination total here includes its first nomination for Outstanding Informational Series in 1997.)

5 nominations

- Deadliest Catch (Note: Deadliest Catch moved in 2011 to Outstanding Unstructured Reality Series.)

4 nominations

- American Experience
- Behind the Music

3 nominations

- 100 Foot Wave
- Anthony Bourdain: No Reservations
- Chef's Table
- 30 for 30

2 nominations

- Cold Case Files
- E! True Hollywood Story
- The Jinx
- Pioneers of Television
- Planet Earth
- This American Life

== Producers with multiple nominations ==
17 nominations

- Julie Sacks

15 nominations

- Susan Lacy

12 nominations

- Frances Berwick
- James Lipton

10 nominations

- Christian Barcellos
- Jeff Wurtz

9 nominations

- Prudence Glass

8 nominations

- Michael Kantor

7 nominations

- Michael Kostel
- John Servidio

6 nominations

- Nancy Abraham
- CarolAnne Dolan
- Lisa Heller
- Mark Samels
- Junko Tsunashima

5 nominations

- Thom Beers
- Ken Burns
- Jeff Conroy
- Dierdre O'Hearn
- Ethan Prochnik
- Tracy Rudolph
- Connor Schell

4 nominations

- Maryellen Cox
- Sabrina Fodor
- Andrew Fried
- Paul Gallagher
- Paul Gasek
- Dane Lillegard
- George Moll
- Matt Renner
- Vienna Steiner

3 nominations

- Josh Braun
- Kevin Burns
- Ric Burns
- Paul Cabana
- James Cameron
- Christopher Collins
- John Dahl
- Margaret Drain
- David Gelb
- Sharon Grimberg
- Alastair Fothergill
- Tamar Hacker
- Martin Scorsese
- Chris Smith
- Fisher Stevens
- Russell McCarroll
- Brian McGinn
- Peter Tarshis
- Lydia Tenaglia
- Matthew Weaver

2 nominations

- Paul Barrosse
- Susan Bellows
- Margaret Bodde
- Steve Boettcher
- Anthony Bourdain
- Dan Braun
- Stanley Buchthal
- Pamela Caragol
- Michael Cascio
- Dan Cogan
- Michael Cohl
- Judy Crichton
- Stephen David
- Lacey Schwartz Delgado
- Michael Epstein
- Laura Fleury
- Mark Ford
- Jeff Gaspin
- Libby Geist
- Gary Goetzman
- David Grubin
- Michael Gunton
- Tom Hanks
- Mark Jonathan Harris
- Michael Harvey
- Ryan Heller
- Mark Herzog
- Martha Holmes
- Allen Hughes
- Tom Hugh-Jones
- Andrew Jarecki
- Tim W. Kelly
- Bill Kurtis
- Susan E. Leventhal
- Jessica Levin
- Joe Lewis
- Eliza Kurtz
- Vinnie Malhotra
- David McKillop
- Stephen J. Morrison
- Lynn Novick
- Tim Pastore
- Stone Roberts
- Sara Rodriguez
- Gay Rosenthal
- Sally Rosenthal
- Kirk Saduski
- Kim Sheerin
- Alice Siess
- Nigel Sinclair
- Shane Smith
- Steven Smith
- Doug Stanley
- Todd Stanley
- Zac Stuart-Pontier
- Justin Sturken
- Liza Tanzer
- Mike Trinklein
- Bentley Weiner
- Mike West
- David C. White
- Maria Wilhelm
- Susan Winslow
- Maria Zuckerman

== Total awards by network ==
- PBS – 15
- Netflix – 3
- Showtime – 2
- Disney+ – 2
- A&E – 1
- BBC America – 1
- Discovery – 1
- ESPN – 1
- HBO – 1
- History – 1
- Hulu – 1
