= Lisa Nishimura =

American film producer

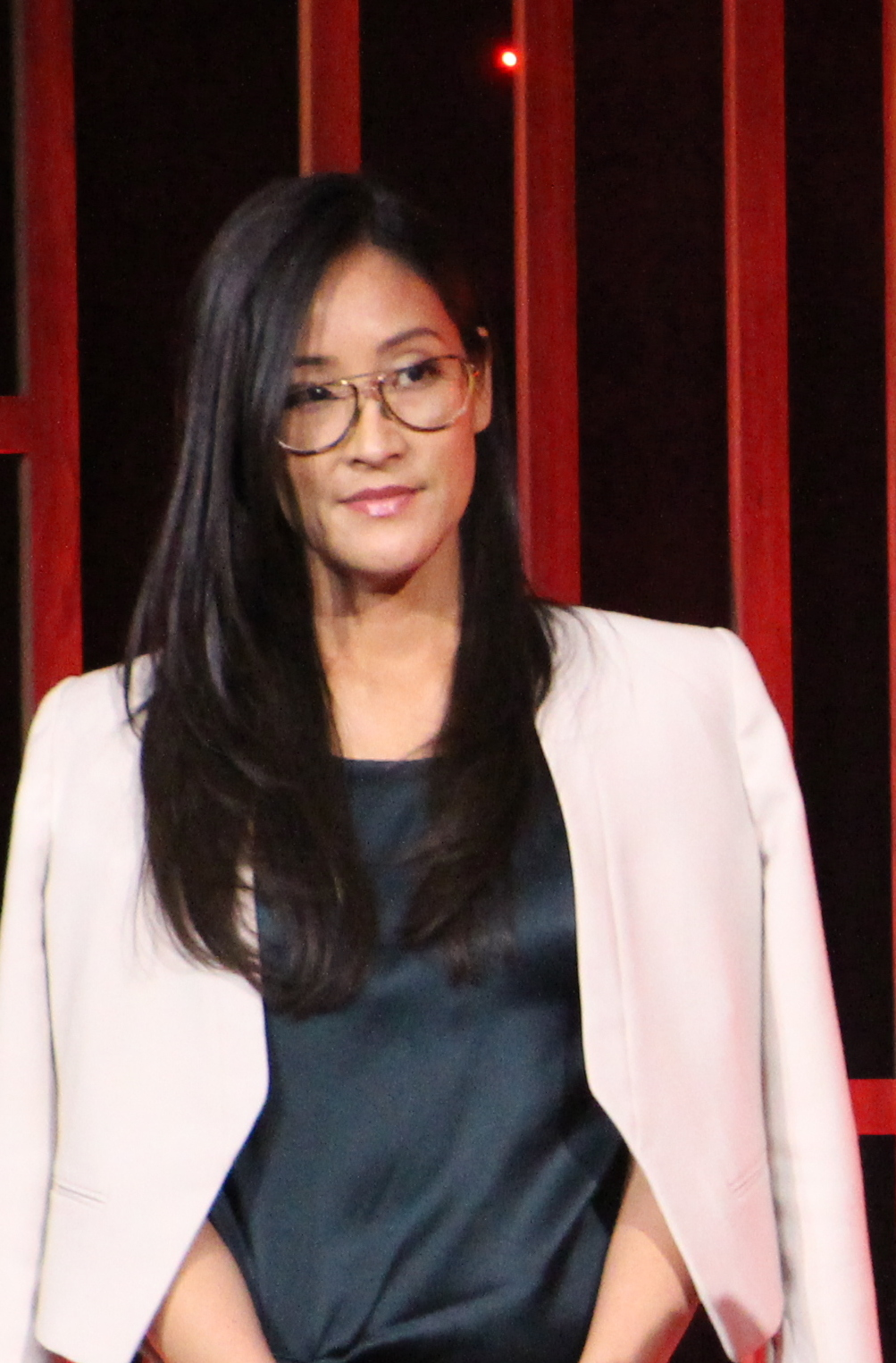
- Born: 1971 or 1972 (age 53–54)
- Education: University of California at San Diego
- Children: 1

Lisa Nishimura is an American entertainment executive, formerly working for Netflix mainly on documentary films, stand-up comedy, and independent films. Her productions include 13th, American Factory, Chef's Table, Making a Murderer, Tiger King, and Wild Wild Country.

Nishimura focuses on original, ambitious programming and unknown filmmakers. She played a major role in expanding the range of documentaries on Netflix. Vanity Fair called her "queen of the docu-series".

== Early life and education ==
Nishimura was born to Japanese immigrants who moved to the United States after World War II. She grew up bilingual, in a "very academic" household in Silicon Valley. Her father was a chemist who went to UC Berkeley on a Fulbright scholarship, and her mother was a classical violinist.

She attended the University of California, San Diego. She planned to go to medical school, but an internship at a record label, Windham Hill Records in Palo Alto, led her to start pursuing a career in the music industry instead.

== Career ==
From 1998 to 2001, Nishimura was head of sales and marketing at Six Degrees Records. From 2002 to 2007, she worked at Chris Blackwell's studio Palm Pictures, where she was general manager. She also worked at Chris Blackwell's Island Records.

She left Palm Pictures in 2007 to join Netflix as vice president of independent content acquisition, reporting to Ted Sarandos. Her role was focused on acquiring content for Netflix, including digital content; 2007 was also the year that Netflix launched its streaming service, having previously focused on DVDs.

In 2013, Nishimura started Netflix's original documentary and original stand-up comedy initiatives. Documentary and comedy are her favorite genres. She has said that they are "similar because both are extremely observant of human conditions, cultures and the world around us" and both give the viewer "immersion in another person’s experience, almost firsthand".

In March 2019, Nishimura moved from being vice president of original documentary and comedy programming, reporting to Cindy Holland, to being vice president of independent film and documentary features, reporting to Scott Stuber. Stuber wrote that Nishimura "blazed a trail within Netflix" working on documentaries and comedy.

Nishimura left Netflix in 2023 as a result of a corporate restructuring.

== Honors ==
In November 2017, she was one of five leading women in business honored by Girls, Inc.

In November 2018, she was honored by New York Women in Film & Television.

In 2020, Time magazine identified her as one of the 100 most influential people of the year.

== Personal life ==
Nishimura lives in Mar Vista, Los Angeles. She is married and has a son.
