= Untold: The Liver King =

- Promotional poster
- Directed by: Joe Pearlman
- Starring: Liver King
- Distributed by: Netflix
- Release date: May 13, 2025
- Country: United States
- Language: English

Untold: The Liver King is a 2025 American sports documentary film directed by Joe Pearlman. It was released on Netflix on May 13, 2025 as the second installment of Volume 5 in the Untold series. The film follows Brian “The Liver King” Johnson, a fitness influencer known for promoting an “ancestral” lifestyle centered on eating raw organ meat. It explores his rapid rise to internet fame and the fallout from his public admission of steroid use, revealing the disconnect between his online persona and real life.
