= Untold: Breaking Point =

- Promotional poster
- Directed by: Chapman Way; Maclain Way
- Produced by: Jake Graham-Felsen; Talin Parseghian Middleton
- Starring: Mardy Fish
- Edited by: Robert Ryang
- Music by: Brocker Way
- Production company: Players' Tribune
- Distributed by: Netflix
- Release date: September 7, 2021
- Running time: 68 minutes
- Country: United States
- Language: English

Untold: Breaking Point is a 2021 American biographical documentary film made for Netflix and directed by Chapman Way and Maclain Way.

== Summary ==
The film is the fifth in the nine-part Untold documentary film series. Its story focuses on the life and career of professional tennis star Mardy Fish, who was burdened by severe anxiety and mental health challenges, which changed his life on and off the court.

== See also ==
- Roger Federer
