= America's Team: The Gambler and His Cowboys =

2025 documentary television series

- Directed by: Chapman Way; Maclain Way
- Composer: Brocker Way
- Country of origin: United States
- Original language: English

Production
- Executive producers: David Ellison; Chapman Way; Maclain Way; John Skipper; Jon Weinbach; Keith Cossrow; Ross Ketover; Ken Rodgers
- Cinematography: David Bolen
- Production companies: Stardust Frames Productions; Skydance Sports; NFL Films

Original release
- Network: Netflix
- Release: August 19, 2025

America's Team: The Gambler and His Cowboys is a 2025 sports documentary series about the Dallas Cowboys during Jerry Jones' ownership. Produced by Skydance Sports, NFL Films, and Stardust Frames Productions, it premiered on Netflix on August 19, 2025. Directed by Chapman and Maclain Way, the 8-episode series covers Jones' tenure and the team's history in the 1990s.

== Premise ==
The series examines Jerry Jones' purchase of the Dallas Cowboys in 1989 for $140 million, a significant deal for an NFL team at the time. It details his replacement of coach Tom Landry, with his former University of Arkansas college teammate, Jimmy Johnson. The documentary highlights the Cowboys' Super Bowl appearances in 1992, 1993, and 1995, using archive footage and interviews with Jones, players Troy Aikman, Emmitt Smith, Michael Irvin, Charles Haley, and Deion Sanders, and coaches Jimmy Johnson and Barry Switzer. Former U.S. President George W. Bush, Nike co-founder Phil Knight, and former chairman of Fox Corporation, Rupert Murdoch, provide additional commentary.

== Episodes ==
The series includes 8 episodes, each around 1 hour each focusing on the Cowboys' history from Jones' 1989 acquisition through their 1990s seasons.

== Production ==
Netflix announced the series in December 2024, with Chapman and Maclain Way directing for Skydance Sports, NFL Films, and Stardust Frames Productions. It uses 1990s NFL Films footage and new interviews with players and coaches. Executive producers include Keith Cossrow, Ross Ketover, Ken Rodgers, David Ellison, Jesse Sisgold, Jon Weinbach, and John Skipper.

== Release ==
The series premiered on Netflix on August 19, 2025, during the Cowboys' 2025 NFL preseason. A teaser trailer dropped on December 19, 2024, followed by the full trailer on June 30, 2025.
