= Untold: Jail Blazers =

- Produced by: Chapman Way; Maclain Way
- Starring: Rasheed Wallace; Bonzi Wells; Damon Stoudamire; Gary Payton
- Production company: Way Brothers Entertainment
- Distributed by: Netflix
- Release date: April 14, 2026
- Country: United States
- Language: English

Untold: Jail Blazers is a Netflix documentary about the Portland Trail Blazers during the early 2000s. It is part of the Untold film series.
