= Michael Barisone =

American dressage rider and trainer

Personal information
- Nationality: American
- Born: August 14, 1964 (age 62)

Sport
- Sport: Equestrianism
- Event: Dressage

Michael Barisone is an American dressage rider and trainer. In August 2019, Barisone shot his student, Lauren Kanarek, twice in the chest and was charged with two counts of attempted murder.

In April 2022, a New Jersey jury found him not guilty by reason of insanity on charges related to Kanarek and not guilty on charges involving Robert Goodwin; he was also acquitted on weapons counts.

== Equestrian career ==
In the 2008 Beijing Olympics, Barisone was the designated alternate for the United States' three-person team. He ultimately did not compete.

In January 2009, The Chronicle of the Horse reported that he won the Grand Prix Special at the Exquis World Dressage Masters in Wellington, Florida, riding Neruda with a score of 69.29 percent. The article reported that Barisone chose the Grand Prix Special rather than the freestyle, which allowed Dutch rider Anky van Grunsven to compete in the freestyle.

A 2018 profile by the United States Eventing Association described Barisone as a clinician based in Long Valley, New Jersey, and Loxahatchee, Florida. The same profile stated that he had worked with Olympic team members Phillip Dutton, Boyd Martin and Clark Montgomery, and that his career included more than 100 CDI Grand Prix wins and a World Cup gold medal at Hickstead in 1997. He was also described as a former Olympian. Barisone was the backup for the United States' team at the 2008 Beijing Olympics and did not ride.

== 2019 shooting and criminal case ==
On August 8, 2019, the Associated Press reported that prosecutors in Morris County, New Jersey, had charged Barisone with two counts of attempted murder and weapons offenses after a shooting at his farm. According to a criminal complaint summarized by the Associated Press, a woman called 911 and said Barisone had shot her twice; police found the woman bleeding on the ground and another man holding Barisone down until officers arrived.

At an August 2019 detention hearing, Barisone's lawyer said that Kanarek and Goodwin had threatened and harassed Barisone, while prosecutors argued that Barisone should remain detained pending trial. State Superior Court Judge Stephen Taylor ordered him held without release pending trial.

Barisone pleaded not guilty by reason of insanity after a Morris County grand jury indictment. The Associated Press reported that Kanarek had to be placed in a medically induced coma and underwent surgery to repair damage to her left lung, and that she later continued to recover.

The trial took place in 2022. The Associated Press reported that the jury deliberated for about 18 hours after a two-week trial. The jury found Barisone not guilty by reason of insanity on the attempted murder of Kanarek and not guilty on the attempted murder of Goodwin. The jury also acquitted him on weapons counts. CBS News later reported that the jury found Barisone legally insane at the time of the shooting. Barisone had no history of serious mental illness.

== Psychiatric treatment and release ==
After the verdict, Barisone was committed for psychiatric evaluation and treatment. In the fall of 2022, he was diagnosed with narcissistic personality disorder (N.P.D.) and obsessive-compulsive personality disorder (O.C.P.D.) at the Greystone Park Psychiatric Hospital. His psychiatrist, Anthony Gotay, has stated that when Barisone spoke of shooting of Lauren Kanarek, he claimed to have "handled the situation perfectly."

While still at the Greystone Park Psychiatric Hospital, he took legal action against the institution and its doctors. He alleged that his diagnoses of N.P.D. and O.C.P.D. were "fabricated."

Eurodressage reported that he was discharged from the Psychiatric Hospital in November 2023 under court-imposed conditions, including remaining in New Jersey, receiving regular psychological treatment, possessing no firearms and having no contact with Kanarek.

== Later litigation and eligibility status ==
In September 2025, The Chronicle of the Horse reported that Barisone had filed a federal lawsuit against the United States Equestrian Federation, alleging that the federation failed to act on earlier complaints he and others had made about Kanarek before the shooting. The article reported that Barisone remained suspended by SafeSport for allegations of misconduct and was ineligible to participate in USEF-recognized shows and activities.

In 2026, People reported that SafeSport had permanently banned Barisone from United States Equestrian Federation events for sexual harassment, emotional misconduct and bylaw violations, and that Barisone denied the allegations and sued the USEF in 2025.

== In media ==
The case was covered in the CBS News program 48 Hours in an episode about the shooting of Lauren Kanarek. In 2026, the case was also examined in the Netflix documentary Untold: The Shooting at Hawthorne Hill, part of the Untold documentary series. The case was also covered in a 2026 article by Ian Parker in The New Yorker titled She Made Me Do It.
