= Wild Wild Country =

2018 documentary series

- Promotional poster
- Genre: Crime; Documentaries
- Directed by: Maclain Way; Chapman Way
- Starring: Rajneesh; Ma Anand Sheela; Jane Stork; Philip Toelkes; Laura Eisen
- Country of origin: United States
- Original language: English
- No. of seasons: 1
- No. of episodes: 6

Production
- Executive producers: Mark Duplass; Jay Duplass; Josh Braun; Dan Braun; Lisa Nishimura; Ben Cotner; Adam Del Deo
- Producer: Juliana Lembi
- Running time: 64–71 minutes
- Production companies: Duplass Brothers Productions; Stardust Frames Productions; Submarine Entertainment

Original release
- Network: Netflix
- Release: March 16, 2018

Wild Wild Country is a Netflix documentary series about the controversial Indian guru Bhagwan Shree Rajneesh (Osho), his one-time personal assistant Ma Anand Sheela, and their community of followers in the Rajneeshpuram community located in Wasco County, Oregon, US. It was released on Netflix on March 16, 2018, after premiering at the Sundance Film Festival.

The title of the series is drawn from the Bill Callahan song "Drover", which features prominently in the final episode, and it also echoes the comments of Jane Stork ("Ma Shanti Bhadra") about first seeing the ranch, shown at the beginning of second episode: "it was just so wild, so rugged, but vast—really wild country". The series received positive reviews from critics and won the Primetime Emmy Award for Outstanding Documentary or Nonfiction Series.

== Episodes ==
No.	Title	Original release date
1	"Part 1"	March 16, 2018
The movement begins in India in 1968. Bhagwan Shree Rajneesh is filling stadiums with 20–30k people. Bhagwan Shree Rajneesh speaks about capitalism, spirituality and sexuality and his followers practice a dynamic form of meditation. Westerners begin moving to India to join the movement so the group decides they want to build a commune but find political resistance in India. A westerner shares with them the Constitution of the United States and the group decides the United States is the best place for them to practice their way of life. They buy 80,000 acres (32,000 ha) in Wasco County, Oregon and begin bringing in mobile homes and building materials to build their agricultural commune. Sheela, who met Bhagwan Shree Rajneesh when she was 16 years old, becomes the administrator, managing the group's millions of dollars. The small community of locals living in the nearby town of Antelope is curious about their new neighbor, who comes into town in a Rolls-Royce, and his followers, which number in the thousands. The group is accused of being a cult and immediately comes onto the radar of the FBI.
2	"Part 2"	March 16, 2018
Ma Anand Sheela and several other Rajneesh sannyasins recount their experiences of moving to the ranch and the hostility from the residents of Antelope. The commune decides to become self-governing which would allow them to issue their own building permits, have separate law enforcement and be completely independent. With the help of architects, engineers, city planners and commune residents, Rajneeshees construct a town called Rajneeshpuram, with its own power station, plumbing, roads, shopping centre, houses, hall, airport and a large meditation hall. Locals describe their experiences of sannyasins and their mistrust towards Bhagwan. The American press begins to affiliate Rajneeshpuram with the Jonestown Massacre and paints Bhagwan Shree Rajneesh as an antichrist and threat to Christianity. The documentary film Ashram in Poona: Bhagwans Experiment sparks concerns with Antelope locals. The group 1000 Friends of Oregon initiates a court case to have the buildings of Rajneeshpuram destroyed. Sheela begins buying up available properties in Antelope, a town of only 40 people, and the locals decide to disincorporate to prevent the Rajneeshees from taking political control. After a bombing of a Rajneesh-owned hotel in Portland, Oregon in 1983, security increases dramatically at the ranch.
3	"Part 3"	March 16, 2018
Local residents complain that the Rajneeshees are obsessed with sex, and can be heard having orgasmic experiences all day and all night. The Rajneesh Foundation's spokesperson, Ma Anand Sheela, is featured and behaves provocatively on several talk shows and news programs. Sheela says "she doesn't believe in turning the other cheek" and her words are muted or her interview is cut off when she uses curse words on air. By then, Bhagwan Shree Rajneesh has 17 Rolls-Royces. Rajneesh communes have popped up all over the world, with about 500,000 members. Sannyasins from all over the world come to Rajneeshpuram in July 1983 for the annual festival. The one non-Rajneesh member in the Antelope town council is spying on the Rajneeshees. He collects garbage discarded by the group and discovers incriminating information, such as sham marriages. He passes the information to David Frohnmayer, the Oregon attorney general. Frohnmayer uses the Establishment Clause to say the creation of the City of Rajneeshpuram by these people is against the U.S. Constitution and he wants the City of Rajneeshpuram to be declared 'null and void'. The Rajneesh start bringing busloads of homeless and street people from cities all over the U.S. to Rajneeshpuram. Sheela admits this is done to win Wasco County elections, and in response, the election commissioner refuses to register any new voters. At this time, members being interviewed say Sheela begins to speak of killing people she deems to be obstacles.
4	"Part 4"	March 16, 2018
The Rajneesh Medical Corporation are accused of having caused a large Salmonella outbreak in the town. Rajneesh deny it. Bhagwan Shree Rajneesh tells Sheela they have to win county electoral seats. Ma Prem Hasya, a Hollywood celebrity, hosts meditation parties to raise money for Bhagwan. Her access to Bhagwan makes Sheela nervous. Bhagwan is addicted to drugs and when Sheela confronts him, he tells her to "stay out of it". The Immigration and Naturalization Service denies Bhagwan's religious leader visa but Rajneesh lawyers appeal and win. Charles Turner, an attorney, investigates sham marriages at the commune. Journalist Les Zaitz does an in-depth report on the group and The Oregonian newspaper publishes it. Sheela threatens violence when asked about the tension between Rajneeshees and authorities. Rumors about Rajneeshees are collected via a hotline. Sheela has Bhagwan's room wiretapped and says his doctor, Deva Raj, is planning to kill him on July 6, 1985. On September 13, 1985, Sheela and her associates, including one who tried to kill Deva Raj, leave the commune. Bhagwan, who had not spoken publicly in three and half years, says Sheela and her "gang of fascists" attempted to kill people.
5	"Part 5"	March 16, 2018
After the plot to kill Deva Raj fails, Sheela and some of her close supporters flee to Germany. The Bhagwan breaks his three-year silence to denounce Sheela and declare her a fascist criminal, then vows to use all his forces to hunt her down. Sheela, fearing for her life, goes into hiding. She admits in an interview that the Bhagwan is a con artist and that the path to enlightenment at the Rajneeshpuram was a delusion. Back at the ranch, Hasya is appointed Bhagwan’s new secretary and a new mayor is chosen. Bhagwan’s public accusations detailing Sheela’s crimes prompt the FBI to open a formal investigation of the community. FBI agents enter the ranch to investigate Sheela’s alleged crimes. At Sheela’s old house, they find a system of underground rooms and tunnels as well as wiretapping equipment. An affidavit reveals that the Rajneesh Medical Corporation (RMC), Ma Anand Puja and Sheela used drugs to sedate and poison Rajneesh, when expressing undesirable behaviors. Meanwhile, a crime lab traces the strain of salmonella from the local restaurant food poisonings back to the RMC lab where it was cultured. The Rajneesh perpetrators are suspected of doing a dry run of a plan to incapacitate enough voters on election day to sway the vote count in their favor. The Bhagwan blames Sheela for establishing the Rajneesh religion as his teachings are anti-religious. He then declares the death of the Rajneesh religion and the community celebrate by burning Sheela’s robes and the prayer Book of Rajneeshism. Sheela gives a tell-all interview with a German magazine. The FBI get search warrants to search the entire ranch. They raid the ranch to seize evidence and make the Bhagwan a prime target of their search. Most Sanyasins are uncooperative witnesses, unwilling to be disloyal to the Bhagwan. However, the FBI have luck with one cooperative witness, Krishna Deva the former mayor of Rajneesh who is promised protection under the United States Federal Witness Protection Program. Arrest warrants and a secret indictment are issued charging the Bhagwan and seven of his followers with thirty-five counts of conspiracy to defraud the United States and making false statements to harbor illegal aliens. The U.S. Marshalls anticipate that violence could erupt when they move in to make arrests as the community is well armed and geographically protected in a canyon. The Oregon National Guard and an FBI SWAT team are called in for stand-by support. Days before the arrests are made, a rancher spots two Learjets flying in then quickly out of the ranch. An informant tells the FBI that the Bhagwan has fled the ranch.
6	"Part 6"	March 16, 2018
The search for Bhagwan begins. The airplane is made to land by communicating with the Coast Guard and the FAA and other officials from the US Justice Department. US agencies now believe the Bhagwan planned to fly to Bermuda to avoid extradition. Heavily-armed agents meet the airplane at the Charlotte, North Carolina airport and arrest Bhagwan and 12 others. The US Marshals take him from facility to facility in shackles for three weeks, upsetting his followers who say this is reckless and abusive. The US authorities, in turn, say he isn't getting any special treatment. The lawyer, in tears, explains that Bhagwan says he would take his case to the Supreme Court if he thought the US government would be fair, but that his body could not take what it had been subjected to, and was willing to plead guilty to the charges of arranging sham marriages. Afterwards he said 'I never want to return to the United States again' and left the USA. Sheela and another follower were sent to federal prison after being found guilty of attempted murder. The followers leave the compound and on January 19, 1990, Bhagwan dies. His funeral is attended by many followers dressed in white, who celebrate. His body is taken to the burning ghats in a huge procession and burned. His ashes are then carried in another celebration with his followers dressed in maroon. At the mausoleum where his ashes are placed, a plaque says 'OSHO. Never Born Never Died Only Visited this Planet Earth between Dec. 11, 1931-Jan. 19, 1990'.

== Reception ==
=== Critical response ===
The review aggregator website Rotten Tomatoes surveyed 46 critical responses and judged 98% of them to be positive, with an average rating of 8.1 out of 10. The website's critical consensus reads, "Wild Wild Country succeeds as an intriguing examination of a forgotten piece of American history that must be seen to be believed." Metacritic, which uses a weighted average, assigned a score of 79 out of 100, based on 8 critics, indicating generally favorable reviews.

Sam Wollaston of The Guardian praised Wild Wild Country, giving it a 5 out of 5, stating that "It doesn’t matter how well you know the Rajneeshpuram story – you won’t have seen or heard it told as thoroughly as this". Nick Allen of RogerEbert.com wrote "by handling this story so intelligently and by opening its heart to a very complicated idea of good and evil, Wild Wild Country has a profound, mesmerizing power itself". Robert Lloyd of Los Angeles Times asserts that "The greater point of the series is its storytelling and wonderful variety of human self-representation, a useful reminder that no two people have the same story to tell. Every speaker is respectfully presented and allowed to speak their piece, and every one is well spoken; rancher or Rajneeshee, government lawyer or commune attorney, each can seem reasonable in turn".

An article published in The New Republic by Win McCormack, a local Oregon activist, criticized Wild Wild Country for leaving out critical information regarding the activities of the Rajneesh followers, particularly regarding sexual assault of women and children as well as possible intent to unleash an AIDS epidemic. McCormack further argued that, "where the filmmakers have fallen down on the job is in the area of interpretation. They have not addressed squarely some of the more important issues raised by their film, and have left others out completely. The latter category includes a few of the cult’s most odious practices, as well as the true extent of the threat it posed not only to its immediate neighbors in Oregon, but to the entire world."

=== Reaction from the Osho International Foundation ===
The Osho International Foundation, which co-administers Rajneesh's estate and operates the Osho International Meditation Resort in Pune, India, responded to the docuseries on their website Osho Times, saying that "Unfortunately, the docuseries fails to explore key aspects and so does not give a clear account of the real story behind the story", and arguing that the events in Oregon were part of "a U.S. government conspiracy, from the White House on down, aimed at thwarting Osho’s vision of a community based on conscious living."

=== Accolades ===
Year	Association	Category	Nominee(s)	Result	Ref.
2018	Critics' Choice Documentary Awards	Best Documentary	Wild Wild Country	Nominated	
2018	Critics' Choice Documentary Awards	Best Limited Documentary Series	Wild Wild Country	Nominated	
2018	Critics' Choice Documentary Awards	Most Innovative Documentary	Wild Wild Country	Nominated	
2018	Critics' Choice Documentary Awards	Best Cinematography	Adam Stone	Nominated	
2018	Hollywood Music In Media Awards	Best Music Supervision – Television	Chris Swanson	Nominated	
2018	International Documentary Association	Best Limited Series	Wild Wild Country	Won	
2018	Primetime Emmy Awards	Outstanding Sound Editing for a Nonfiction Program (Single or Multi-Camera)	Brent Kiser, Jacob Flack, Elliot Thompson, Danielle Price, Timothy Preston (for "Part 1")	Nominated	
2018	Primetime Emmy Awards	Outstanding Sound Mixing for a Nonfiction Program (Single or Multi-Camera)	Chapman Way (for "Part 1")	Nominated	
2018	Primetime Emmy Awards	Outstanding Picture Editing for Nonfiction Programming	Neil Meiklejohn (for "Part 3")	Nominated	
2018	Primetime Emmy Awards	Outstanding Directing for a Documentary/Nonfiction Program	Chapman Way; Maclain Way (for "Part 3")	Nominated	
2018	Primetime Emmy Awards	Outstanding Documentary or Nonfiction Series	Mark Duplass, Jay Duplass, Josh Braun and Dan Braun, Juliana Lembi, Chapman Way and Maclain Way	Won	
2019	Primetime Emmy Awards				
2019	American Cinema Editors	Best Edited Documentary - Non-Theatrical	Neil Meiklejohn	Nominated	
2019	Cinema Eye Honors	Outstanding Achievement in Nonfiction Series for Broadcast	Chapman Way; Maclain Way	Nominated	
2019	Producers Guild of America Awards	Outstanding Producer of Non-Fiction Television	Jay Duplass; Mark Duplass; Josh Braun; Dan Braun; Juliana Lembi	Nominated	

== Soundtrack ==
Wild Wild Country (Original Score)

Soundtrack album by Brocker Way
- Released: 21 September 2018
- Genres: Folk; Country
- Length: 43:27
- Label: Western Vinyl
- Producer: Brocker Way

The show's score album was released on September 21, 2018, via Western Vinyl Records. The soundtrack was composed by Brocker Way. Apart from the score, numerous pre-released songs were also used throughout the series.

Wild Wild Country (Original Score)
No.	Title	Length
1.	"The Guillotine"	1:53
2.	"Fashionable Leather Shoes"	1:01
3.	"Come Home"	2:25
4.	"Life for Myself"	2:33
5.	"Those of Us Who Were There"	3:24
6.	"The New Man"	2:04
7.	"High Desert"	4:04
8.	"Be Grateful for This Beautiful Home"	2:21
9.	"Church and State"	2:17
10.	"An Adventure of My Life"	6:23
11.	"Spies in Overalls"	2:08
12.	"The Takeover"	3:04
13.	"Chosen People"	3:32
14.	"It Was a Town"	2:49
15.	"The Burning Ghats"	3:29
Total length:		43:27

== Related films ==
Oregon Experience from PBS and the Oregon Historical Society began its seventh season with a documentary about the community that aired in November 2012.

In January 2019, Priyanka Chopra announced that she would be starring as Ma Anand Sheela in an Amazon Studios feature film adaptation of Wild Wild Country. Titled Sheela, the drama film was written by Nick Yarborough and was to be directed by Barry Levinson. As of 2026, the film has not been produced.

In 2019, Documentary Now! released the two-part episode "Batsh*t Valley", parodying Wild Wild Country featuring Owen Wilson and Michael Keaton.

In November 2019, Netflix announced a documentary titled Searching for Sheela, which follows Osho's former top aide on her first journey home to India in more than 30 years. The documentary aims to give insight into Sheela's involvement and later prosecution for the 1984 Rajneeshee bioterror attack in Oregon. The documentary premiered on Netflix on April 22, 2021.

In October 2024, ITV1 aired Children of the Cult, a documentary film by Maroesja Perizonius, who grew up in a Rajneesh commune, that investigates allegations of the sexual abuse of children in communities established by Rajneesh. Reportedly, some of the survivors of the alleged abuse were disappointed that Wild Wild Country neglected to include these experiences of former members who were children during their time with the Rajneesh movement.
