= Woman with Gloria Steinem =

Documentary TV series

Woman with Gloria Steinem is a Viceland documentary television series featuring Gloria Steinem.

== Overview ==
The series focused on stories relating to the status of women around the world.

== Reception ==
=== Accolades ===
In 2016 the series was nominated for the Primetime Emmy Award for Outstanding Documentary or Nonfiction Series.
