= Untold: The Fall of Favre =

- Promotional poster
- Directed by: Rebecca Gitlitz
- Starring: Brett Favre
- Distributed by: Netflix
- Release date: May 20, 2025
- Country: United States
- Language: English

Untold: The Fall of Favre is a 2025 American sports documentary film directed by Rebecca Gitlitz. It was released on Netflix on May 20, 2025, as the third installment of Volume 5 in the Untold series.

== Synopsis ==
The film investigates the controversies surrounding former NFL quarterback Brett Favre, focusing on allegations of inappropriate conduct involving sports reporter Jenn Sterger and his connection to a Mississippi welfare fraud scandal.

== Production ==
Through interviews, archival footage, and legal documentation, the documentary examines how Favre’s public image unraveled, raising broader questions about celebrity, accountability, and the protections often afforded to high-profile athletes.

== Viewership ==
According to data from Showlabs, Untold: The Fall of Favre ranked ninth on Netflix in the United States during the week of 19–25 May 2025.
