= Tony Vainuku =

American documentary film director and cinematographer

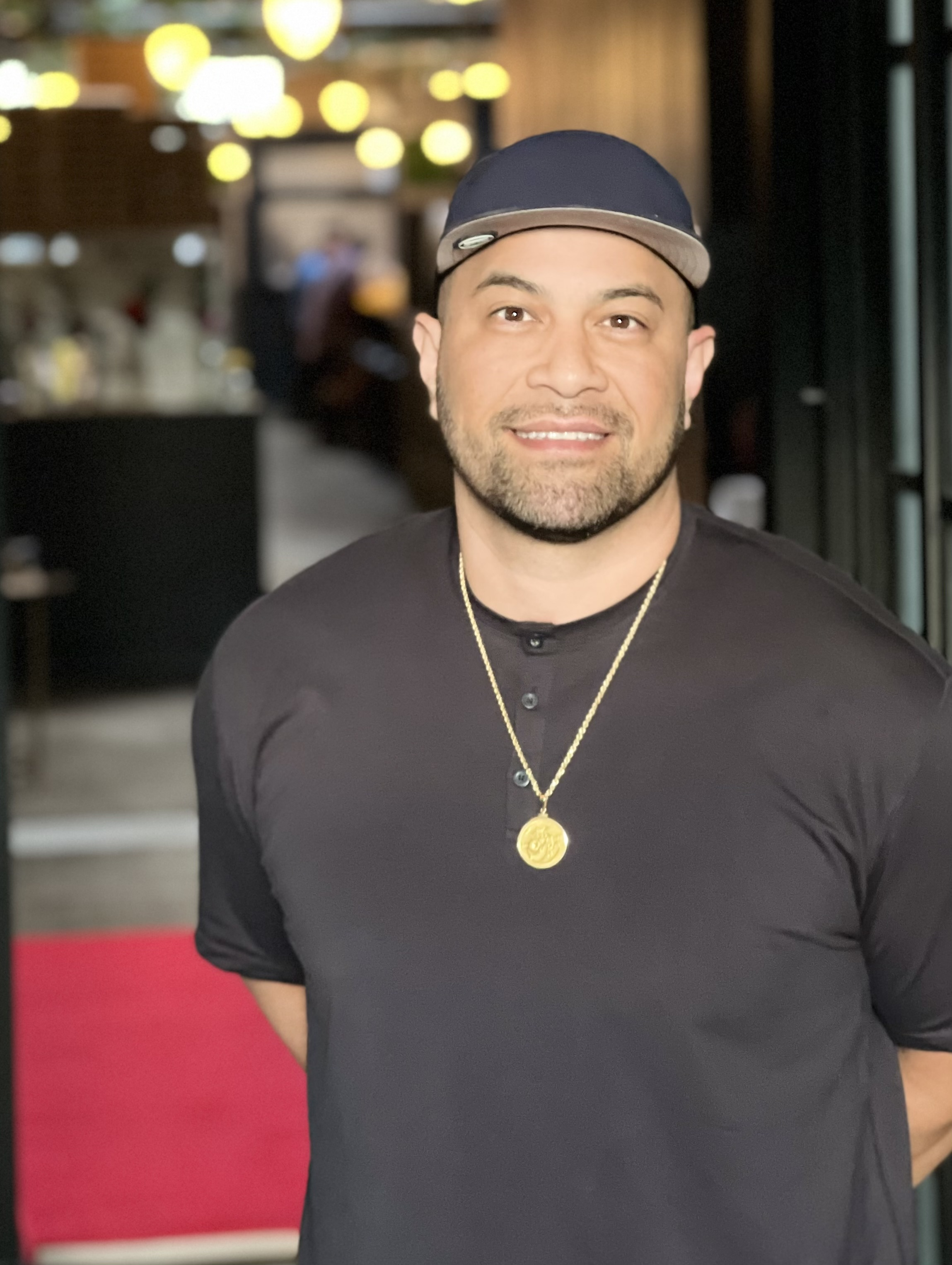
- Born: Salt Lake City, Utah, U.S.
- Occupations: Director, cinematographer
- Years active: 2015–present

Tony F. Vainuku is an American documentary film director and cinematographer. He is best known for directing the Netflix documentary Untold: The Girlfriend Who Didn't Exist and the PBS Independent Lens documentary In Football We Trust.

== Life and career ==
Tony was born in Salt Lake City, Utah and his parents were both immigrants: his father was from Tonga, and his mother from the Netherlands. He is the cousin of television personality Jen Shah. He graduated from Westminster College in Utah. In 2015, he directed his debut feature documentary In Football We Trust, along with Erika Cohn, which premiered at the Sundance Film Festival. In 2022, he directed the Netflix documentary Untold: The Girlfriend Who Didn't Exist. Recently he signed with the production company M88.

== Filmography ==
Year	Title	Contribution	Note
2015	In Football We Trust	Director and cinematographer	Documentary
2022	Untold: The Girlfriend Who Didn't Exist	Director	Documentary

== Awards and nominations ==
Year	Result	Award	Category	Work	Ref.
2015	Nominated	Hawaii International Film Festival	Best Documentary Feature	Independent Lens : In Football We Trust	
2017	Won	News and Documentary Emmy Awards	Outstanding Business and Economic Documentary	Independent Lens : In Football We Trust	
