= The Kings of Tupelo: A Southern Crime Saga =

American crime drama television series

- Genre: True crime
- Directed by: Chapman Way; Maclain Way
- Composer: Brocker Way
- Country of origin: United States
- Original language: English
- No. of seasons: 1
- No. of episodes: 3

Production
- Executive producers: Juliana Lembi; Chapman Way; Maclain Way; Dave Caplan; Greg Berlanti; Sarah Schechter; David Madden; Mike Darnell
- Production companies: Stardust Frames Productions; C2 Pictures; Berlanti Productions; Warner Bros. Television

Original release
- Network: Netflix
- Release: December 11, 2024

The Kings of Tupelo: A Southern Crime Saga is a television documentary miniseries made for Netflix and directed by Chapman Way and Maclain Way. It was released on December 11, 2024.

== Premise ==
The Kings of Tupelo is a crime drama documentary series that weaves together a complex narrative involving a small-town feud, internet conspiracy, Elvis impersonation, black market organ trafficking, and a presidential assassination attempt in Mississippi.

The series focuses on Kevin Curtis, a former Elvis impersonator and conspiracy theorist from Tupelo, Mississippi. Curtis was fired from the North Mississippi Medical Center and became convinced the hospital was involved in illegal organ harvesting. Curtis developed a feud with his state representative, Steve Holland, after Holland refused to support his proposed legislation on organ trafficking. Holland also coincidently owned several funeral homes, fueling Curtis's conspiracy theories. Curtis was later framed by James Everett Dutschke – a taekwondo instructor, Wayne Newton impersonator, and Republican candidate for office in 2007 who ran against Holland – for sending the 2013 ricin letters to President Barack Obama, Judge Sadie Holland, and Senator Roger Wicker.

== Production ==
The series was directed by Chapman Way and Maclain Way.

== Release ==
The trailer released in November 2024. The series premiered on Netflix on 11 December 2024.
