= Untold: Crimes & Penalties =

- Promotional poster
- Directed by: Chapman Way; Maclain Way
- Produced by: Jake Graham-Felsen; Talin Parseghian Middleton
- Starring: James Galante; AJ Galante; Richard Brosal
- Edited by: Neil Meiklejohn
- Music by: Brocker Way
- Production company: Players' Tribune
- Distributed by: Netflix
- Release date: August 31, 2021
- Running time: 85 minutes
- Country: United States
- Language: English

Untold: Crimes & Penalties is a 2021 American biographical documentary film made for Netflix and directed by Chapman Way and Maclain Way. The film was released on August 31, 2021.

== Summary ==
The film is the fourth installment in the Untold documentary film series. Its story focuses on the now defunct United Hockey League (UHL) ice hockey team the Danbury Trashers, which was bought by James Galante, a mafia-connected trash kingpin and associate of the Genovese crime family who gifted the team to his 17-year-old son, A. J., making him the president and general manager of the team.

== See also ==
- List of films about ice hockey
