= Untold: The Race of the Century =

2022 documentary

- Promotional poster
- Directed by: Chapman Way; Maclain Way
- Music by: Brocker Way
- Production company: Players' Tribune
- Distributed by: Netflix
- Release date: September 6, 2022
- Country: United States
- Language: English

Untold: The Race of the Century is a 2022 American Netflix original documentary film directed by Chapman Way and Maclain Way. The film was released on September 6, 2022.

== Summary ==
The film is the ninth installment in the nine-part Untold: documentary film series. Its story follows The Australia II yacht crew who dethroned the New York Yacht Club at the 1983 America's Cup, breaking their 132-year win streak.
