= The Marriage App =

2022 Argentinian movie

- Directed by: Sebastián De Caro
- Written by: Gabriel Korenfeld; Rocio Blanco
- Starring: Luisana Lopilato; Juan Minujín
- Production company: Buffalo Films
- Release date: 2022
- Country: Argentina
- Language: Spanish

The Marriage App (Spanish: Matrimillas) is a 2022 Argentinian comedy romance movie, directed by Sebastián De Caro. It stars Luisana Lopilato and Juan Minujín in lead roles. It is written by Gabriel Korenfeld and Rocio Blanco. The story follows a young couple with children, who to revitalize their marriage, use an app which rewards points for each good thing they do for each other. Everything goes perfect in the beginning until the obsession of getting points spirals takes over.

== Plot ==
Belén and Frederico are a couple with two children. Frederico works as a dentist, but he wanted to be a chef. He spends most of his time perfecting his cooking skills with his friends. One day, they discovered that they have been selected for an amateur cooking competition in Cancun, Mexico. But he did not have the courage to tell this to his wife, Balén, that he will be going away for few days. They meet Balén's sister Natalia and her husband German. From them, they got to know about a program called 'Equilibrium', which would help them get passion back in their life.

== Cast ==
- Luisana Lopilato as Belén
- Juan Minujín as Federico
- Cristina Castaño as Milán
- Laura Paredes as School Director
- Betiana Blum as Alicia
- Carla Pandolfi as Nati
- Andrea Rincón as Juana
- Julián Lucero as Gonza
- Paloma Contreras as Gala
- Jorge Takashima as Arata Tanaka
- Javier Pedersoli as Germán
- Juan Tupac Soler as Orson
- Facundo Baum as Camarero Resto
- Victoria García Garabal as School Secretary
- Bety Cosoy as Anciana robo
- Miranda Johansen as Rest recepcionalist
- Aaron Miglio as Aaron Miglio
- Santiago Gobernori as Renato
- Vicente Archain as Toto
- Patricio Censi as Miel
- Hernán Montenegro as Club secretary
- Aylen Malisani as Mica
- Tessa Stokes as Gala (voice)
- Dustin Kerls as Gonza (voice)

== Production ==
The movie is produced by Buffalo Films. It is directed by Sebastion de Caro. The screenwriters are Gabriel Korenfeld and Rocío Blanco. It is produced in Spanish language. It was released on December 7, 2022.
