= April 2013 ricin letters =

Attempted assassinations

2013 ricin letters
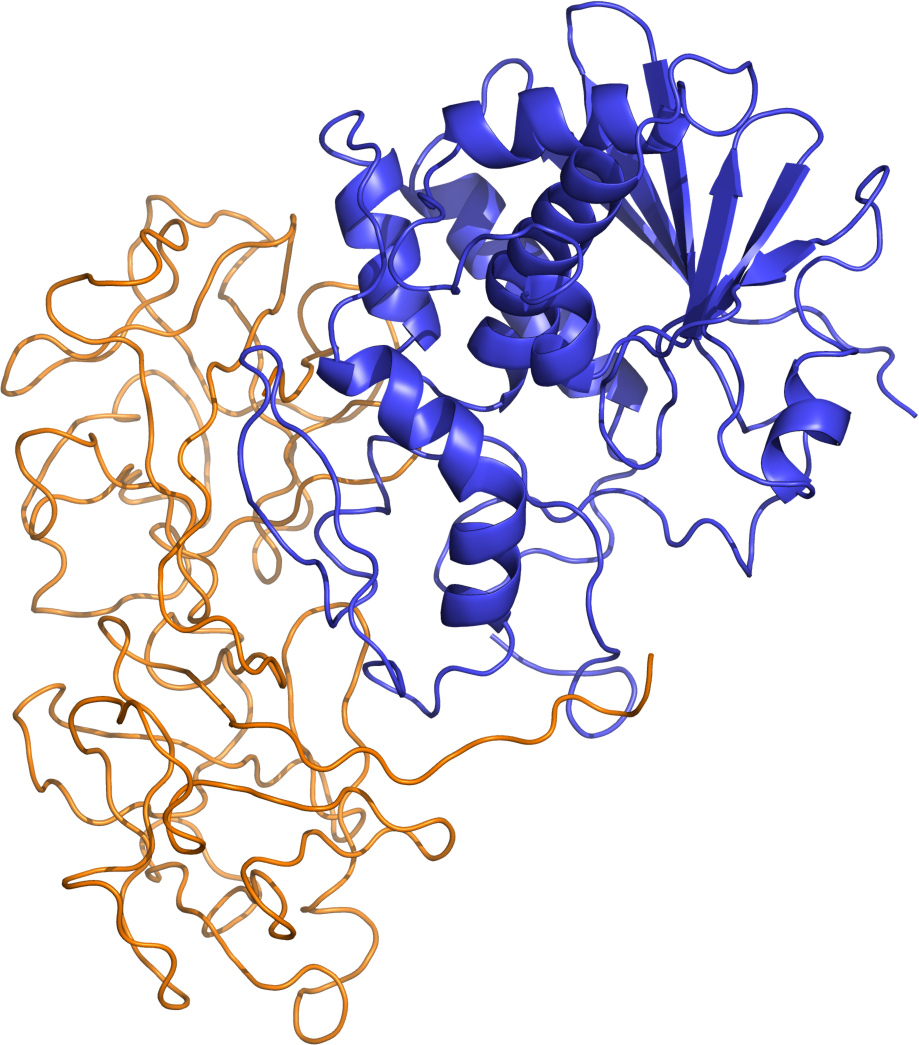
- Ricin
- Location: Washington, District of Columbia, US
- Date: April 15–17, 2013
- Target: Sen. Roger Wicker, President Barack Obama, Mississippi Judge Sadie Holland
- Attack type: Bioterrorism, attempted poisoning, attempted assassination
- Weapon: Ricin
- Deaths: 0
- Injuries: 0
- Perpetrator: James Everett Dutschke

On April 15, 2013, an envelope that preliminarily tested positive for ricin, a highly toxic protein, was intercepted at the US Capitol's off-site mail facility in Washington, D.C. According to reports, the envelope was addressed to the office of Mississippi Senator Roger Wicker. Another letter was sent to Sadie Holland, mother of state representative Steve Holland. On April 17, 2013, an envelope addressed to President of the United States Barack Obama preliminarily tested positive for ricin.

Both letters, which were postmarked in Memphis, Tennessee, included the phrases "No one wanted to listen to me before. There are still 'Missing Pieces.' Maybe I have your attention now even if that means someone must die. This must stop. To see a wrong and not expose it, is to become a silent partner to its continuance." and "I am KC and I approve this message."

A third letter mailed to a Mississippi judge, Lee County Justice Court Judge Sadie Holland, that was received and opened on April 10, contained similar language and was sent for testing. The FBI claimed the letters tested positive for ricin.

The event and people involved were profiled in the 2024 Netflix docuseries The Kings of Tupelo: A Southern Crime Saga.

== Early suspect released ==
On April 17, 2013, FBI agents detained a Tupelo, Mississippi, Elvis impersonator, Paul "Kevin" Curtis, on suspicion of mailing the ricin-laced letters. Curtis had had disputes with letter recipients Roger Wicker and Judge Sadie Holland as well as Holland's son Steve Holland. All charges were dropped however, and he was released on April 23, 2013. Federal investigators reported that they could find no evidence linking him to the letters. An FBI agent testified that no ricin or evidence of ricin ingredients were found in the man's home, nor did a preliminary forensic analysis of his computer reveal anything related to ricin. The defense attorney claimed in court that his client was being framed, possibly by acquaintance James Everett Dutschke, with whom he had been feuding online.

== Second arrest ==
On April 23, agents in hazardous materials suits searched the home of a Tupelo, Mississippi man in connection with the ricin investigation. On April 27, the man, identified as James Everett Dutschke, was arrested in connection with the case. Under suspicion since the release of the prior suspect, Dutschke denied the allegations through his lawyer. Saying that new information had been discovered in the case, authorities who had placed his house under surveillance arrested Dutschke in the early hours of April 27. Later that day, Dutschke was charged with attempted use of a biological weapon. On June 3, 2013, Dutschke was indicted by a federal grand jury on five counts. He was indicted for producing and using the deadly toxin as a weapon, and using the mail to threaten President Obama, Sen. Roger Wicker of Mississippi and Lee County Judge Sadie Holland.

In May 2014, Dutschke pleaded guilty and was sentenced to 25 years in prison.

== See also ==
- Incidents involving ricin
- Boston Marathon bombings, a terrorist attack that was mistakenly connected to the letters.
- The Kings of Tupelo: A Southern Crime Saga, a documentary series detailing the incident
