= Untold (film series) =

Series of sports documentary films

Untold is a series of sports documentary films distributed on Netflix.

== Summary ==
Each volume consists of multiple films released in weekly installments, with each film covering a unique and lesser-known sports story.

== Release ==
Debuting in 2021, Volume 1 consists of five films on a range of different sports including basketball, tennis and hockey. Volume 2 was released in 2022, as four films about sports like football and yachting. Volume 3 was released in 2023, starting at August 1, with four films about sports like boxing and football.

== Volumes ==
=== 1 (2021) ===
- Untold: Malice at the Palace: The brawl in the Palace of Auburn Hills between fans and professional basketball players.
- Untold: Deal with the Devil: Christy Martin's professional boxing career and life with her husband and trainer.
- Untold: Caitlyn Jenner: Caitlyn Jenner's life and Olympic career.
- Untold: Crimes & Penalties: The Danbury Trashers, a now defunct United Hockey League team.
- Untold: Breaking Point: Mardy Fish's life and career in professional tennis.

=== 2 (2022) ===
- Untold: The Girlfriend Who Didn't Exist: Football player Manti Te'o's online relationship with a girl that didn't exist.
- Untold: The Rise and Fall of AND1: American sportswear brand AND1's rise and fall.
- Untold: Operation Flagrant Foul: NBA referee Tim Donaghy and his role in the 2007 NBA betting scandal.
- Untold: The Race of the Century: The 1983 America's Cup where the Australia II yacht crew dethroned the New York Yacht Club.

=== 3 (2023) ===
- Untold: Jake Paul the Problem Child: YouTube star turned professional boxer Jake Paul.
- Untold: Johnny Football: Johnny Manziel's rise and fall from football.
- Untold: Hall of Shame: Victor Conte and the BALCO scandal.
- Untold: Swamp Kings: The Florida Gators football team from 2005 through 2009, including Tim Tebow and Urban Meyer.

=== 4 (2024) ===
- Untold: The Murder of Air McNair: The 2009 murder-suicide resulting in the death of retired NFL quarterback Steve McNair.
- Untold: Sign Stealer: NCAA and its allegations against Connor Stalions.
- Untold: Hope Solo vs. U.S. Soccer: Hope Solo's relationship with the U.S. women's soccer team and the USSF.

=== 5 (2025) ===
- Untold: Shooting Guards: The infamous locker room incident between Washington Wizards players Gilbert Arenas and Javaris Crittenton.
- Untold: The Liver King: The rise and fall of Brian Johnson, also known as the "Liver King".
- Untold: The Fall of Favre: A look into Brett Favre's post-career controversies, including the Mississippi welfare funds scandal.

=== 6 (2026) ===
- Untold: The Death & Life of Lamar Odom: Lamar Odom and ex-wife Khloé Kardashian revisit his rise with the Lakers, and their private struggles
- Untold: Chess Mates: Story of Hans Niemann's cheating scandal, including Magnus Carlsen
- Untold: Jail Blazers: The early 2000s history of the Portland Trail Blazers
- Untold: The Shooting at Hawthorne Hill: Dressage trainer Michael Barisone, who was charged with and acquitted of shooting equestrian rider Lauren Kanarek at Barisone's New Jersey training facility.

=== Untold UK (2026) ===
- Untold UK: Jamie Vardy
- Untold UK: Liverpool's Miracle of Istanbul: Story of the 2004-05 Liverpool squad's unprecedented win in the 2005 UEFA Champions League final against AC Milan.
- Untold UK: Vinnie Jones

=== 7 (2026) ===
- Untold: The Testimony of Vince Young: Quarterback Vince Young's career following his victory at the 2006 Rose Bowl.
- Untold - Raygun: Breaking Badly: Explores the controversies surrounding breakdancer Rachael Gunn's performance at the 2024 Summer Olympics.
- Untold - Mr. T: I Pity the Fool: Follows the early career of Laurence Tureaud before he was known as Mr. T.

== See also ==
- 30 for 30
- Bad Sport
