= Untold: The Rise and Fall of AND1 =

2022 documentary by Kevin Wilson Jr.

- Promotional poster
- Directed by: Kevin Wilson Jr.
- Starring: Seth Berger; Jay Coen Gilbert; Tom Austin; Grayson Boucher; Philip Champion; Waliyy Dixon; Shane Woney; Rafer Alston
- Cinematography: Corey C. Waters
- Edited by: Will Butler
- Music by: Brocker Way
- Production company: The Players' Tribune
- Distributed by: Netflix
- Release date: August 23, 2022
- Running time: 68 minutes
- Country: United States
- Language: English

Untold: The Rise and Fall of AND1 is a 2022 American Netflix original documentary film directed by Kevin Wilson Jr.

== Summary ==
The film is the seventh installment in the nine-part Untold documentary film series. Its story follows the rise and fall of the American sportswear brand AND1. It was released on August 23, 2022.

== Cast ==
- Seth Berger
- Jay Coen Gilbert
- Tom Austin
- Grayson Boucher
- Philip Champion
- Waliyy Dixon
- Shane Woney
- Rafer Alston
- Stephon Marbury
