= Untold: Caitlyn Jenner =

- Promotional poster
- Directed by: Crystal Moselle
- Produced by: Jake Graham-Felsen; Talin Parseghian Middleton
- Starring: Caitlyn Jenner
- Cinematography: David Bolen
- Edited by: Nate Gross
- Music by: Brocker Way
- Production company: Players' Tribune
- Distributed by: Netflix
- Release date: August 24, 2021
- Running time: 69 minutes
- Country: United States
- Language: English

Untold: Caitlyn Jenner is a 2021 American biographical documentary film made for Netflix and directed by Crystal Moselle. The film was released on August 24, 2021.

== Summary ==
The film is the third installment in the nine-part Untold documentary film series. Its story focuses on the life and Olympic career of Caitlyn Jenner, who won the gold medal in decathlon at the 1976 Montreal Olympics.
