= Untold: Malice at the Palace =

- Promotional poster
- Directed by: Floyd Russ
- Produced by: Jake Graham-Felsen; Talin Parseghian Middleton
- Starring: Jermaine O'Neal; Stephen Jackson; Metta Sandiford-Artest; Reggie Miller; Donnie Walsh
- Edited by: Nate Gross
- Music by: Brocker Way
- Production company: Players' Tribune
- Distributed by: Netflix
- Release date: August 10, 2021
- Running time: 68 minutes
- Country: United States
- Language: English

Untold: Malice at the Palace is a 2021 American documentary film made for Netflix and directed by Floyd Russ. The film is the first installment in the nine-part Untold documentary film series. Its story focuses on the infamous brawl that occurred between fans and NBA players during the Indiana Pacers and Detroit Pistons game at The Palace of Auburn Hills on November 19, 2004. The film was released on August 10, 2021.

== Summary ==
On November 19, 2004, the Indiana Pacers and Detroit Pistons were competing in one of the first games of the NBA season and tensions were already high. In the previous seasons Eastern Conference Finals, the two teams had gone head to head with the Pistons coming out on top. It was a home game this season for the Pistons, with a sold-out crowd a lots of Pistons fans.

At the end of the game, with 45.9 seconds left, Pacers player Ron Artest fouled Pistons player Ben Wallace, leading to a confrontation between the teams on the court. Artest went to lay down on the scorers table where he was then struck with a drink that had been thrown by a Pistons fan. Artest then stormed the stands and attacked the fan that he had thought to be the one to throw the drink. From there, chaos ensued and there was a full brawl between fans and players.

== Conclusion ==
The remainder of the game was never completed, and players were taken to their respective locker rooms as quickly as possible. It was in those locker rooms that they were instructed not to discuss the events of the evening with the media, and to wait for the punishments that would be given out. The players listened and did not speak out on the situation until the Untold: Malice at the Palace documentary was released.
