= Untold: Operation Flagrant Foul =

2022 documentary by David Terry Fine

- Promotional poster
- Directed by: David Terry Fine
- Starring: Tim Donaghy
- Music by: Brocker Way
- Production company: Players' Tribune
- Distributed by: Netflix
- Release date: August 30, 2022
- Country: United States
- Language: English

Untold: Operation Flagrant Foul is a 2022 American Netflix original documentary film directed by David Terry Fine. The film was released on August 30, 2022.

== Summary ==
The film is the eighth installment in the nine-part Untold documentary film series. Its story is centered around NBA referee Tim Donaghy, who was caught in the 2007 NBA betting scandal where he was gambling on his own games.

== Criticism ==
Prominent critics such as Tom Haberstroh and Bill Simmons noted this film largely portrayed Donaghy's version of events, which had been debunked, and pointed out the aspects of the program that were disproven with evidence years before, for example, Donaghy claims of threats and the role of organized crime, and the sociology of the scandal.
