= Untold: The Girlfriend Who Didn't Exist =

2022 American documentary film

- Promotional poster
- Directed by: Tony Vainuku; Ryan Duffy
- Starring: Manti Te'o
- Edited by: Nate Gross
- Music by: Brocker Way
- Production company: Players' Tribune
- Distributed by: Netflix
- Release date: August 16, 2022
- Country: United States
- Language: English

Untold: The Girlfriend Who Didn't Exist is a 2022 American sports documentary film directed by Tony Vainuku and Ryan Duffy. The film was released by Netflix on August 16, 2022, as part of the second volume of films in the Untold series.

== Summary ==
The film is the sixth installment in Untold documentary film series. Its story follows the life and career of All-American Notre Dame football player Manti Te'o and explores how a clandestine online relationship threatened both his career and legacy.

== See also ==
- 2012 Notre Dame Fighting Irish football team
- Deadspin, the sports website that first reported the hoax after receiving an anonymous tip.
