= David Price (boxer) =

English professional boxer (born 1983)

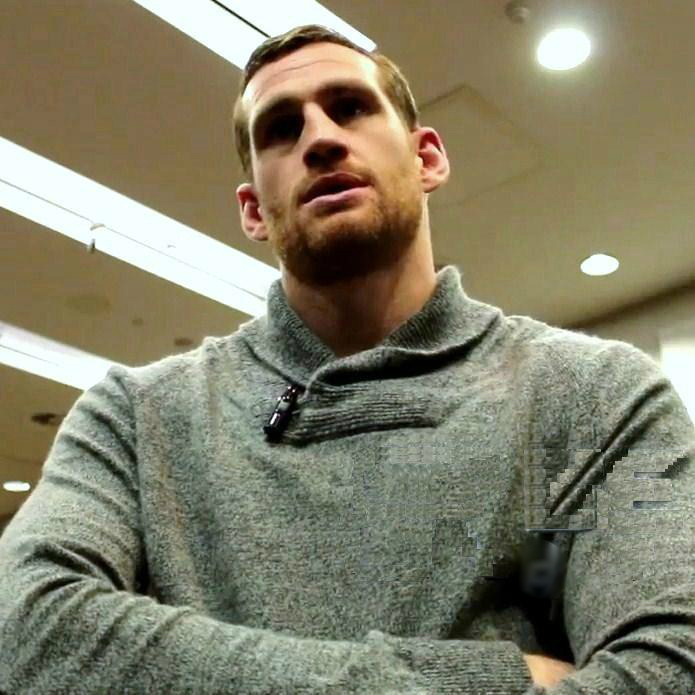
- Price in 2013

Personal information
- Born: 6 July 1983 (age 43) Liverpool, England
- Height: 6 ft 8 in (203 cm)
- Weight: Heavyweight

Boxing career
- Reach: 82 in (208 cm)
- Stance: Orthodox

Boxing record
- Total fights: 32
- Wins: 25
- Win by KO: 20
- Losses: 7 (Note: Sources vary: Price's loss against Erkan Teper was changed to a no contest by the Bund Deutscher Berufsboxer (BDB; Association of German Professional Boxers), giving Price six official losses. The EBU, who sanctioned the fight, maintain the original result as valid, along with BoxRec, giving Price seven official losses.)
Medal record
Men's amateur boxing
Representing Great Britain
Olympic Games
Bronze medal – third place	2008 Beijing	Super-heavyweight
Representing England
European Union Championships
Gold medal – first place	2008 Cetniewo	Super-heavyweight
Commonwealth Games
Gold medal – first place	2006 Melbourne	Super-heavyweight
Strandzha Cup
Bronze medal – third place	2006 Pleven	Super-heavyweight
Silver medal – second place	2007 Plovdiv	Super-heavyweight
Commonwealth Championships
Gold medal – first place	2003 Kuala Lumpur	Super-heavyweight
Gold medal – first place	2007 Liverpool	Super-heavyweight
Four Nations Championships
Silver medal – second place	2003 Cardiff	Super-heavyweight
Gold medal – first place	2005 Liverpool	Super-heavyweight
English National Championships
Gold medal – first place	2003 London	Super-heavyweight
Gold medal – first place	2005 London	Super-heavyweight
Gold medal – first place	2007 London	Super-heavyweight
Copenhagen Cup
Bronze medal – third place	2002 Roskilde	Super-heavyweight

David Price (born 6 July 1983) is a British former professional boxer who competed from 2009 to 2019. At regional level, he held multiple heavyweight championships, including the British and Commonwealth titles from 2012 to 2013, and challenged once for the European title in 2015. As an amateur, he won a gold medal at the 2006 Commonwealth Games and 2008 European Union Championships, and bronze at the 2008 Olympics.

== Amateur career ==
Early in his career, Price boxed for Long Lane ABC before leaving through lack of available funding, for Salisbury ABC and in 2003 became the youngest ever ABA champion in the super-heavyweight division, at 19 years and 272 days old. He competed for England at a number of international tournaments, he beat Travis Kauffman twice at the 2003 USA vs. England Tournament. In August 2003 he won the Commonwealth Confederations tournament in Kuala Lumpur, defeating Muzzafar Iqbal of Pakistan 21:9, and Justin Whitehead of Australia 22:6. He then defeated Gregory Corbin on points in the England–US duel in Liverpool.

Price lost to Roberto Cammarelle in the quarter-finals of the European Amateur Boxing Championships in Bulgaria in 2004, a defeat that prevented him from going to the Athens Olympics. Later that year Price made it to the finals of the Tammer Tournament in Finland, but he was stopped by Bermane Stiverne. He bounced back to win his second A.B.A Title in March 2005, defeating Damien Campbell of Repton ABC in the final. He also went on to win the 4 Nations Championships and two weeks later, a win which enabled him to compete in the inaugural 4 Nations vs Cuba match, in which he was his side's sole victor, defeating Lisovan Hernandez. He participated at the 2005 World Amateur Boxing Championships but lost on points to Robert Helenius 25–22.

At the Strandya Cup in Bulgaria, he was stopped by Ukrainian Vyacheslav Glazkov, though he ended the year on a high note defeating highly touted teenage compatriot and future unified world heavyweight champion Tyson Fury 22:8. Then going on to win his 3rd A.B.A title, defeating Tom Dallas 27:4. At the 2007 Commonwealth Championships he stopped Australian Daniel Beahan in the final.

=== 2006 Commonwealth Games ===
Price captained the 2006 Commonwealth Games boxing team in Melbourne and achieved a gold medal there, beating Indian Varghese Johnson in the process, despite being knocked down three times.

=== 2007 World Amateur Championships ===
At the 2007 World Amateur Boxing Championships in Chicago he defeated three opponents including Marko Tomasović of Croatia 23:11, Frenchman Mohamed Samoudi whom he stopped, Primislav Dimovski (Skopje) 20:4 but a hand injury kept him from showing for his fight against Roberto Cammarelle. GB head coach Terry Edwards said: "David has boxed particularly well in these World Championships and it is therefore a big disappointment that he was unable to box for automatic Olympic qualification here in Chicago, a right he had fought for."

=== 2008 Olympic Games ===
Two years after his Commonwealth Games success, Price captained the GB team who went to Beijing for the 2008 Olympic Games, beating Romanian World Junior Champion Cristian Ciocanu to qualify. Price met European Champion Islam Timurziev in the first round of the Olympics, and stopped Timurziev in the second round after dropping him to the canvas on two occasions in the round, the scores were level at 2:2 at the time. The next round saw Price matched against Lithuanian Jaroslavas Jakšto but Price progressed into the next round after Jakšto retired with an injury at the end of the first round when the scorecards favored Price, 3:1. Guaranteed at least a bronze medal, David Price was to meet Italian world champion Roberto Cammarelle, a bout in which the referee stopped in the second round when the scores favored the eventual Olympic gold medalist, Cammarelle, 10:1. The Englishman ended an impressive run at the Olympics with a bronze medal in the 91+kg Super-Heavyweight division. After winning a bronze medal, and not achieving the gold he sorely wanted, he announced his intention to turn professional.

== Professional career ==
=== Early career ===
Price made his debut at the age of 25 at the Echo Arena in Liverpool on 28 March 2009 defeating David Ingleby via 3rd-round TKO. He went on to win his next nine fights with seven coming inside the distance. Price stopped fellow British fighter Tom Dallas at the Liverpool Olympia, inflicting a second-round TKO propelling Price closer to a British title shot. He scheduled a bout with John McDermott, due to take place on 5 November 2011, but Price was forced to pull out of the British and Commonwealth title eliminator with a rib injury which he suffered in sparring with former England team-mate Danny Price. Price also sparred with fellow heavyweight David Haye before Haye's world title fight with Ukrainian Wladimir Klitschko in July 2011.

On 21 January 2012, Price was fighting for the English heavyweight title against an experienced fighter in John McDermott. The winner of the bout would be the mandatory challenger against the British and Commonwealth heavyweight champion, Tyson Fury; who many fans and pundits felt that McDermott won against in the first bout between the pair. It only took 73 seconds of the first round for Price to win against McDermott. Price knocked down McDermott 3 times before the referee, Howard John Foster, decided to end the bout; inflicting McDermott with a TKO defeat.

=== British and Commonwealth champion ===
==== Price vs. Sexton ====
On 19 May 2012 at Aintree Racecourse in Liverpool, Price beat Sam Sexton in a fourth-round KO victory, and won the vacant British and Commonwealth heavyweight titles. The fight was ordered by the BBBof C on 9 February after Tyson Fury vacated in order to step up. Widely considered Price's best performance to date, he impressively controlled the bout with his jab and distance, hurting Sexton badly whenever he connected. In the fourth round Price knocked Sexton out cold. Price's promoter Frank Maloney likened the victory to Lennox Lewis' breakout performance against Donovan Ruddock and Price was universally considered at that time to be the most dangerous up and coming contender in the division.

==== Price vs. Harrison ====
On 13 October 2012 he made his first defence of his British and Commonwealth heavyweight titles against fellow Olympian Audley Harrison at Liverpool's Echo Arena on the 'Battle of the Olympians' bill, scoring the most brutal and vicious knockout of his career to date. Price landed a powerful right hand after 30 seconds sending Harrison retreating to the ropes, he then unloaded with a concussive combination; an uppercut followed by body blow and then a right hand that shattered Harrison's nose and sent him to the canvas unconscious. It had taken Price just 82 seconds to score the win and he showed genuine concern for his opponent after the fight. Maloney offered Fury £500,000 to fight Price.

==== Price vs. Skelton ====
Immediately after the fight, it was confirmed that Price would box Matt Skelton on 30 November. He knocked out Skelton in the 2nd round of the fight.

As a result of his impressive performances and formidable punching power, Price was named Prospect of the Year by ESPN in 2012.

=== Consecutive defeats ===
==== Price vs. Thompson ====
In December 2012, it was announced that Price would fight American former two-time world title challenger Tony Thompson (36–3, 24 KOs) at the Echo Arena in Liverpool on 23 February 2013. This was regarded as a big step up for Price and a win would see him likely earn a future world title fight. At the time, Thompson was ranked IBF #5. Promoter Frank Maloney said, "This is the right fight at the right time for David and one where a win will propel him even higher. Thompson still has ambition and I am certain that he will come to win and score a major upset." Price was a heavy betting favourite among bookmakers and many were intrigued to see how Price would fare against a common Wladimir Klitschko opponent. Price was looking to fight Tyson Fury for the Lonsdale belt after this fight. The bout was televised in the UK on Boxnation.

Price lost his first professional fight, as he was stopped in two rounds by Thompson in front of 6,000 fans in attendance. Price took his time but was seemingly in total control of the bout. In the second round Price caught Thompson with a right hand sending him hurt to the ropes, he then launched his first big attack of the bout. Thompson had been cautious and tentative throughout and it looked as though he was soon to be taken over and stopped, however to the crowd's shock Thompson threw a counter right hand that hit Price awkwardly behind the ear sending him to the canvas, Price beat the count but the location of the punch behind the ear and on the neck damaged his equilibrium and the bout was waved off. Thompson had scored the heavyweight upset of the year at that point.

After the post-fight press conference, Price's 60 year old promoter Frank Maloney collapsed. He was attended to by paramedics, given oxygen and then taken to hospital for further check-up. Maloney previously suffered a heart attack in 2009 after his fighter Darren Sutherland died.

==== Price vs. Thompson II ====
Promoter Maloney claimed there was a rematch clause in place, but they wouldn't ask for it straight away and let Thompson enjoy his win. Upon hearing about the rematch clause, Thompson replied, "They can clause all the hell they want. I'm not coming back. They vastly underpaid me for this fight and I just took it for the opportunity. I've now created that opportunity and if they want to fight me again, then first of all they've got to come to my side of the Atlantic and then they've got to pay me what I'm worth." On 27 March, a rematch was confirmed to take place again at the Echo Arena, despite Thompson stating he would only fight in the United States, on 6 July. According to Maloney, although there was a rematch clause in place, the fight was still hard to make as rival promotions were also interested in Thompson. Price stated he also had other options. One option was to fight British rival Derek Chisora, but decided to take a small pay cut to avenge his only loss. Price revealed former world champion Lennox Lewis advised him to take the rematch. Thompson weighed 259 pounds, 3 pounds lighter than the first fight and Price came in at 250 pounds. The fight was aired live in the United States on Wealth TV.

Price put Thompson down heavily in round 2 with a powerful right hook, but Thompson beat the count. Both men traded shots, with Price absorbing a lot of shots to the body; the damage was visible by the fourth round. Price, who seemed exhausted after round 4, was ordered by Lennox Lewis from ringside to stand up in the corner between rounds to liven himself. Price seemed to collapse physically in the fifth round, at one point turning his back to Thompson and retreating to the corner where the referee started a count. Price motioned as though he had given up and the referee stopped the fight awarding Thompson a 5th-round TKO victory.

After this loss Price separated from trainers Franny Smith and Lennox Lewis and it was later announced that Thompson had failed a drugs test and was subsequently banned by the British Boxing Board of Control for 18 months. Thompson's team was furious over the failed drug test and in a statement they claimed Thompson was prescribed high blood pressure medication and it was disclosed prior to the fight with Price.

=== Return to the ring ===
In November 2013, it was announced that Price would be signing a promotional deal with German boxing promoter Team Sauerland and on 5 December 2013 it was announced that he would be vacating his British and Commonwealth titles.

In his first fight back following the back-to-back losses to Thompson, Price got back to winning ways with a first-round knockout victory over Istvan Ruzsinszky in Stuttgart, Germany on 25 January 2014. Price displayed his trademark power flooring Ruzsinszky, who was a late replacement for Konstantin Airich, with a big right hand.

==== Price vs. Pala ====
Price recorded a second successive win on 12 April 2014 with the third-round knockout of Ondřej Pála in Esbjerg, Denmark. Price was forced to climb off the canvas after a flash knockdown in the opening round, but was able to regain his composure in the second round before flooring Pala twice in the third, forcing the referee to call a halt to the action.

In his next contest, Price comfortably outpointed Yaroslav Zavorotnyi on 7 June 2014 in Schwerin, Germany. After ten hard fought rounds, for the first time in four years, the former British and Commonwealth went the scheduled distance, leaving the decision in the hands of the judges.

On 21 February 2015, Price defeated Irineu Beato Costa Junior in Berlin, Germany. After a cautious start, Price began to boss his Brazilian opponent around the ring, before unloading a massive right hand in the sixth-round to finish the fight prematurely. Following the fight Price declared his intentions to return home to Liverpool for his next fight. Price was also made mandatory challenger for the vacant European Heavyweight title.

=== European title challenge ===
==== Price vs. Teper ====
On 15 May 2015, it was announced that Price would fight German boxer Erkan Teper, little-known but with an undefeated record of (14–0, 9 KOs) on 17 July. The bout was for the vacant EBU (European) heavyweight title and presented an opportunity for Price to become a top contender again. Price, who was the betting favourite, was caught in the second round with a left hook that knocked him unconscious. However, Teper was later found to have failed a drugs test. Teper was subsequently banned and the result changed to a No Contest by the Bund Deutscher Berufsboxer (BDB). However, Boxrec.com maintains that the record was not changed to a No contest: "The EBU maintains that it was supervising the contest and as such EBU rules must be applied, therefore keeping the result of Teper WTKO 2 / 12 but stripping the title."

=== Later career ===
In February 2016, Price confirmed Dave Coldwell as his new trainer ahead of his 29 May fight at Goodison Park. It was announced Price would fight Vaclav Pejsar (9–2, 8 KOs) on the Bellew-Makabu undercard. Price was considerably bigger and more solid than in previous fights. During the first round, Price threw a counter uppercut that knocked Pejsar to the ground for the first time in his career and gave him a black eye. Pejsar came out aggressively in the second but eventually got put down from another uppercut and failed to beat the count. Following the victory Price publicly announced his desire to challenge then IBF champion Anthony Joshua.

Price continued his comeback on 1 October in Germany, stopping journeyman Ivica Perkovic in the second round with a body shot. Price was in control from the opening and his speed and power seemingly too much for the journeyman with a reputation for durability. Price hit Perkovic so hard in round two that it forced him to ask for the fight to be stopped as he was in too much agony to continue. He stated he now wanted to fight Joseph Parker if he can not secure a fight with Joshua. Price signed to fight Dave Allen in another tune up bout on 22 October but was forced to pull out due to illness.

==== Price vs. Hammer ====
On 8 January 2017 it was announced that Price would fight on the undercard of IBO super-middleweight bout Eubank Jr. vs. Quinlan at the Olympia in London on 4 February against WBO European heavyweight champion Christian Hammer (20–4, 11 KOs) to take place on ITV Box Office. Hammer won a split decision against previously undefeated Erkan Teper in October 2016. On 3 February, a day before the fight, it was confirmed that Hammer's WBO European heavyweight title would be at stake, as well as the fight being an official world title eliminator. Price started the fight well using his reach advantage to keep Hammer at a distance. In round 5, Price connected with an uppercut which floored Hammer, however he beat the count and the fight resumed. The end came when Hammer landed hooks to the head of Price as the referee looked at him and decided to stop the fight, giving Hammer the win via TKO in round 7.

On 7 August 2017, it was announced that Price would fight again on the undercard of Callum Smith vs. Erik Skoglund at the Echo Arena in Liverpool on 16 September 2017. Price last fought at the Echo Arena in July 2013, where he lost his second consecutive fight to American veteran Tony Thompson. It was revealed that Price had parted ways with trainer Dave Coldwell and would now train with George Vaughan, Derry Mathews and Joe McNally. Price called this fight a 'make or break' for career. A day later, it was announced that he would fight journeyman Raphael Zumbano Love. Former trainer Coldwell stated based on his last conversation with Price, he had decided to retire. Coldwell wished Price well in his return. Following a hand injury suffered in training, the fight was called off. Price would next fight UK based Polish journeyman Kamil Sokolowski on 2 December 2017 at the Brentwood Centre Arena in Brentford, having last fought there in 2010. Price put on a muted performance, beating Sokolowski after six rounds. The referee scored the fight 60–54 in favour of Price. He stated he intentionally went the full six rounds. In the post-fight interview, Price said, "He’d be a good sparring partner. I thought that was a good performance tonight. I landed most of my jabs. I want to do an 8 rounder. I must have thrown 4 punches all night with spite in it. I was boxing his face off." When asked who he would fight next, Price gave no names.

==== Price vs. Povetkin ====
On 16 January 2018, after unification fight Anthony Joshua vs. Joseph Parker was announced, promoter Eddie Hearn offered WBA mandatory challenger Alexander Povetkin an opportunity to fight on the undercard, which would take place on 31 March at the Principality Stadium in Cardiff, Wales. Price and Derek Chisora were two names offered as potential opponents. The next day, Price spoke to Sky Sports stating he accepted Hearn's offer and would be willing to fight Povetkin. On 30 January, Hearn told a reporter a deal was close being done after Povetkin also agreed to the fight. Three days later, the fight was officially confirmed. Povetkin won the fight via knockout in round 5. Povetkin badly hurt Price with a right hand, who was then defenseless, Povetkin finished off with a left hook that put Price down flat on the canvas. Without a count, referee Howard John Foster halted the fight. The official time of the stoppage was at 1:02 of round 5. In round 3, Povetkin knocked Price down with a right hand to the head. Price got up and came back strong landing some hard punches of his own. Price hurt Povetkin late in round 3 with a left hook which resulted in Povetkin falling backwards towards the ropes. The referee ruled it a knockdown due to the ropes holding Povetkin up. Price did not take advantage of the knockdown, but it looked as though he had tired himself out.

In early May, Price confirmed his comeback would be on 27 July at the Macron Stadium in Bolton. Due to a back injury, on the day of the event, MTK Global confirmed Price would not fight on the card.

==== Price vs. Kuzmin ====
In early August 2018, it was rumoured that Price would appear on the Joshua vs. Povetkin undercard against rising Russian heavyweight Sergei Kuzmin (12–0–1, 9 KOs). On 20 August, it was announced that Price would next fight on 5 October at the Titanic Exhibition Centre in Belfast against Irish boxer Sean Turner (12–3, 8 KOs). On 10 September, Turner pulled out of the bout. Former two-time world title challenger Eric Molina was the first to put his name forward to fight Price, although at the time, he was banned for an anti-doping violation. On 13 September, according to MTK Global, Price was pulled from the card. Later that date, it was announced that Price would indeed fight Kuzmin on the Joshua vs. Povetkin card at the Wembley Stadium in London on 22 September. Price retired hurt at the end of the fourth round citing a bicep tear. At the time of the stoppage, Price appeared to be winning the fight at the time of the fight being halted, although he also appeared tired. Kuzmin showed that he was able to take Price's best power shots to keep coming. Kuzmin kept coming forward and landing hard body shots.

==== Price vs. Little ====
In November 2018, trainer Joe McNally revealed Price would return to the ring on the Whyte vs. Chisora II undercard on 22 December at The O2 Arena on Sky Box Office. On 16 November, Hearn announced some undercard fights, one being Price against British boxer Tom Little in a 6-round bout. It would mark the third consecutive PPV undercard fight for Price. Little was Price's first British opponent since he beat Matt Skelton in November 2012. On 30 November, the fight was announced by Sky Sports as a 'must win' for Price. Price won the fight by TKO in the fourth round. The end came when Price landed a flurry of head shots. Little was troubled by a right uppercut and a left hook and the referee intervened, waiving the fight off. The crowd booed, suggesting the stoppage was premature. The official time was 2:38 of the round. Little expressed his disgust by shoving the referee. Fans also posted on social media to show their outrage towards the end.

==== Price vs. Ali ====
On 24 December 2018, Hearn revealed he was planning to hold an event in Liverpool at the ECHO Arena on 30 March 2019, with Price rumoured to be on the card. The fight would be Price's first in his home city in three years. The main event was Liam Smith vs. Sam Eggington. Speaking to The Liverpool Echo, Price discussed his professional losses. He said, "I’ve had six knockout defeats and two of them have been genuine. The other four, I’ve kind of beat myself in those fights." His opponent was later announced as the outspoken, undefeated Birmingham heavyweight Kash Ali (15–0, 7 KOs) at the newly renamed M&S Bank Arena. The two had a history or sparring each other at Dave Coldwell’s gym. Ali said he was looking to knockout Price and retire him and announce himself. Price did not react well to the comments Ali made in the press conference, he later spoke to Sky Sports, "I think I will knock him out, I think I will knock him out but it won't be early, if it is it will be a surprise because I know he can be quite cagey." Price did not usually get involved in trash talk, and said his previous opponents have always show him respect.

Ali fought dirty from the get go, repeatedly fouling Price and also seemed to have bitten Price during the early rounds. Price controlled the early rounds with his reach advantage behind the jab. In round 3, Ali was forced to hold after taking some hard shots from Price which busted his nose. In the fifth round, Ali started the round fast and Price began to look tired. Ali tackled and bit Price on his torso while he was on the canvas. Referee Mark Lyson immediately called for a disqualification and awarded Price with the victory. The bite mark was very visible. Ali had objects thrown at him from the crowd as he made his way to the back. When asked about a possible rematch, Price said, "I don’t want to share a ring with an animal like that again." Tony Bellew also branded Ali as "a disgrace". The BBBofC were said to be investigating the incident, with Ali likely to receive a ban.

Price believed Ali was about to taste a stoppage loss, which caused him to fight dirty and ultimately bite him. Price wanted to fight the winner of Lucas Browne vs Dave Allen, which was due in April 2019. Ali spoke to IFL tv to explain his actions. He said, "There’s no excuses for it. I think just the build-up to the fight. It’s my first time boxing on a big stage. I was so pumped up, I just wanted to fight. The street mentality just kicked in, it was stupid. As mad as it sounds, when I ended up on top of him, boxing went out the window. I just thought, ‘this is a fight now.’ - [it was] stupid. It was out of order and I apologize to him." Ali also had his £20,000 purse minus expenses held and was asked to appear before the British Boxing council. Ali also released a statement via Sky Sports, publicly apologising for his behaviour. Ali also spoke to Price and apologised to him. Price graciously accepted his apology. Ali was banned for 6 months and received a £10,000 fine.

==== Price vs. Allen ====
Allen stopped Browne in their fight and an offer was sent to Price to make the next fight. On 28 April, the fight between Price and Allen (17–4–2, 14 KOs) was announced to take place on the undercard of Dillian Whyte vs. Óscar Rivas at The O2 Arena on 20 July 2019, live on Sky Sports Box Office. Allen had been wanting the fight for 3 years. Allen felt a win here, would put him one fight away from a possible world title eliminator. Promoter Eddie Hearn called it a 50-50 clash. Allen was the bookies favourite heading into the fight. Price stated he would look for the stoppage and knock Allen down. Allen was known for only being stopped on his feet in his previous losses. For Price, this was the biggest fight of his career and he said he would treat it as a world title fight. He understood a loss here would be the end of his career.

Contrary to what most boxing analysts expected, Price not only won the fight, but also did it by a big margin, putting on his best performance in over seven years. Price dominated Allen throughout most of the fight as Allen wasn't able to get Price in any kind of trouble during all 10 rounds. Big fight experience was showing as Allen was dominated and outclassed by a much bigger Price. He used his height and reach to his advantage and controlled the distance. After the tenth round, Allen, looked defeated and knowing he had no way back in the fight, instructed his trainer Darren Barker to stop the fight. Allen had to put on an oxygen mask after the fight was stopped and was later taken to hospital to get checked over. After the fight, Allen discussed his deteriorating health and hinted this may be his last fight.

==== Price vs. Chisora ====
On 31 August 2019, a fight between Derek Chisora (31–9, 22 KOs) and Joseph Parker was announced to take place at the O2 Arena in London on 26 October, with the bout taking place as the co-main event to the World Boxing Super Series: Light welterweight final between Regis Prograis and Josh Taylor live on Sky Sports Box Office. On 2 October, it was announced Parker had been forced to withdraw from the fight due to a spider bite that was causing illness during training. On 8 October, Price was announced as Chisora's replacement opponent. Price had been keeping fit and stayed in the gym through Summer knowing an opportunity could come at anytime. In September, it was reported that Chisora and Dave Coldwell had parted ways on good terms. The reason due to Coldwell being based in Rotherham, having commitments with local boxers and Chisora who was based in London, and often fighting in London. Chisora asked Coldwell to train in London and Coldwell was unable to accept the terms.

Speaking ahead of the fight, Chisora admitted he had a soft spot for Price, as they went through the ranks together. He said, "Come fight week, everything goes out the window, man. Best friend or not best friend, I’m coming to destroy you. After that we can shake hands and love each other, fight week it’s war." During fight week, Chisora revealed Steve Broughton has his new trainer, who would work his corner for the fight. He retained Ruben Tabares as his strength and conditioning coach. Broughton was known to have worked with former world champions Josh Taylor, Carl Frampton and David Haye previously. Hearn spoke about the opportunities for the winner, possibly to fight former undisputed cruiserweight champion Oleksandr Usyk in 2020 at heavyweight. This all depended on what Usyk wanted to do. Hearn stated the winner of Chisora and Price would get a big fight next regardless. Chisora weighed in at 260¼ pounds and Price was slightly heavier at 264¼ pounds.

Chisora won the fight via 4th-round TKO. He came out throwing punches, looking to land, but Price, the taller boxer, was looking to hold and at the same time land some of his own shots. In round two, the action continued with both trying to land shots. Round 3 saw Chisora increase the pressure and upped the pace of the fight. Chisora got Price on the ropes following some shots to the head and it looked as if the end was near. Price landed a right uppercut on Chisora’s chin, backing him up. Round 4 started and Chisora did not take any chances in trying to get Price out of there. He landed shots on the inside overwhelming Price, who began to breathe heavily, eventually dropping to the canvas for the count. Price managed to beat the count with the help of the ropes looking distressed. It appeared as thought referee Howard Foster was going to let the action continue until his corner threw in the towel. Some felt it was premature, however Price took some heavy damage. In the post-fight interviews, Chisora said, "I came to seek and destroy. If I caught him, he would be gone. It was just business. He stepped up and saved the show. He buzzed me and caught me with an uppercut but I recovered easily and I came back and finish the job."

=== Retirement ===
On 7 October 2021, after two years of inactivity, at the age of 38, Price announced his retirement from boxing via an Instagram post. Speaking to BT Sport, he stated:

"The hunger is no longer there and that's massive. The glory had gone in my career and I was fighting for a bit of extra money. My mind was made up [to retire] six weeks ago. I knew I would get offered a fight in Liverpool on the Liam Smith v Anthony Fowler show [on 9 October]. I did get offered something and I made sure I was in the gym when the call came but there was no desire to fight, I didn't even want to know who it was. I have set up a business doing a bit of building work and I've got my properties and I'm happy and content with how it ended."

Price ended his career with 25 wins from his 32 professional bouts.

== Personal life ==
Price is a club patron of A.F.C. Liverpool.

== Professional boxing record ==
32 fights	25 wins	7 losses
By knockout	20	7
By decision	4	0
By disqualification	1	0

No.	Result	Record	Opponent	Type	Round, time	Date	Location	Notes
32	Loss	25–7	Derek Chisora	TKO	4 (12), 2:00	26 Oct 2019	The O2 Arena, London, England	For vacant WBO Inter-Continental heavyweight title
31	Win	25–6	David Allen	RTD	10 (12), 3:00	20 Jul 2019	The O2 Arena, London, England	Won vacant WBA Continental (Europe) heavyweight title
30	Win	24–6	Kash Ali	DQ	5 (10), 2:20	30 Mar 2019	Echo Arena, Liverpool, England	Ali disqualified for biting
29	Win	23–6	Tom Little	TKO	4 (8), 2:38	22 Dec 2018	The O2 Arena, London, England	
28	Loss	22–6	Sergey Kuzmin	RTD	4 (10), 3:00	22 Sep 2018	Wembley Stadium, London, England	For vacant WBA Inter-Continental heavyweight title
27	Loss	22–5	Alexander Povetkin	TKO	5 (12), 1:02	31 Mar 2018	Principality Stadium, Cardiff, Wales	For WBA Inter-Continental and WBO International heavyweight titles
26	Win	22–4	Kamil Sokolowski	PTS	6	2 Dec 2017	Brentwood Centre Arena, Brentwood, England	
25	Loss	21–4	Christian Hammer	TKO	7 (12), 1:22	4 Feb 2017	London Olympia, London, England	For WBO European heavyweight title
24	Win	21–3	Ivica Perkovic	TKO	2 (6), 2:10	1 Oct 2016	Jahnsportforum, Neubrandenburg, Germany	
23	Win	20–3	Vaclav Pejsar	TKO	2 (8), 1:30	29 May 2016	Goodison Park, Liverpool, England	
22	Loss	19–3	Erkan Teper	KO	2 (12), 0:52	17 Jul 2015	MHPArena, Ludwigsburg, Germany	Vacant European heavyweight title at stake; Although the BDB overturned the result after Teper failed a drug test, the EBU ultimately upheld Teper's victory
21	Win	19–2	Irineu Beato Costa Junior	TKO	6 (10), 2:59	21 Feb 2015	O2 World, Berlin, Germany	
20	Win	18–2	Yaroslav Zavorotnyi	UD	10	7 Jun 2014	Sport- und Kongresshalle, Schwerin, Germany	
19	Win	17–2	Ondřej Pála	KO	3 (8), 0:33	12 Apr 2014	Blue Water Dokken, Esbjerg, Denmark	
18	Win	16–2	Istvan Ruzsinszky	TKO	1 (8), 2:00	25 Jan 2014	Hanns-Martin-Schleyer-Halle, Stuttgart, Germany	
17	Loss	15–2	Tony Thompson	TKO	5 (12), 1:55	6 Jul 2013	Echo Arena, Liverpool, England	
16	Loss	15–1	Tony Thompson	TKO	2 (12), 2:17	23 Feb 2013	Echo Arena, Liverpool, England	
15	Win	15–0	Matt Skelton	KO	2 (12), 2:56	30 Nov 2012	Aintree Racecourse, Liverpool, England	Retained British and Commonwealth heavyweight titles
14	Win	14–0	Audley Harrison	TKO	1 (12), 1:22	13 Oct 2012	Echo Arena, Liverpool, England	Retained British and Commonwealth heavyweight titles
13	Win	13–0	Sam Sexton	KO	4 (12), 2:07	19 May 2012	Aintree Racecourse, Liverpool, England	Won vacant British and Commonwealth heavyweight titles
12	Win	12–0	John McDermott	KO	1 (12), 1:13	21 Jan 2012	Liverpool Olympia, Liverpool, England	Won vacant English heavyweight title
11	Win	11–0	Tom Dallas	TKO	2 (10), 2:45	11 Jun 2011	Liverpool Olympia, Liverpool, England	
10	Win	10–0	Raphael Butler	TKO	1 (8), 1:47	27 Apr 2011	Liverpool Olympia, Liverpool, England	
9	Win	9–0	Osborne Machimana	TKO	3 (10), 2:53	5 Feb 2011	Brentwood Leisure Centre, Brentwood, England	
8	Win	8–0	Raman Sukhaterin	TKO	7 (8), 2:44	16 Oct 2010	Troxy, London, England	
7	Win	7–0	Pavol Polakovic	TKO	1 (8), 1:42	25 Jun 2010	Brentwood Centre Arena, Brentwood, England	
6	Win	6–0	Daniil Peretyatko	PTS	6	14 May 2010	Goresbrook Leisure Centre, London, England	
5	Win	5–0	Martyn Grainger	TKO	1 (6), 1:05	19 Mar 2010	Indoor Sports Centre, Leigh, England	
4	Win	4–0	Dmitrijs Basovs	KO	1 (6), 0:33	11 Dec 2009	Newport Centre, Newport, Wales	
3	Win	3–0	Yavor Marinchev	PTS	4	23 Oct 2009	Bolton Arena, Bolton, England	
2	Win	2–0	Liridon Memishi	RTD	2 (6), 3:00	16 Oct 2009	Seaburn Centre, Sunderland, England	
1	Win	1–0	David Ingleby	TKO	3 (6), 2:30	28 Mar 2009	Echo Arena, Liverpool, England	

== Notes ==
Sporting positions
Amateur boxing titles
Previous: Matthew Grainger	ABA super-heavyweight champion 2003	Next: Joe Young
Previous: Joe Young	ABA super-heavyweight champion 2005	Next: Derek Chisora
Previous: Derek Chisora	ABA super-heavyweight champion 2007	Next: Tyson Fury
Regional boxing titles
Vacant Title last held by Tyson Fury	English heavyweight champion 21 January 2012 – May 2012; Vacated	Vacant Title next held by John McDermott
Vacant Title last held by Tyson Fury	Commonwealth heavyweight champion 19 May 2012 – 4 December 2013; Vacated	Vacant Title next held by Lucas Browne
Vacant Title last held by Tyson Fury	British heavyweight champion 19 May 2012 – 4 December 2013; Vacated	Vacant Title next held by Tyson Fury
Vacant Title last held by Joe Joyce	WBA Continental (Europe) heavyweight champion 20 July 2019 – October 2019; Vacated	Vacant Title next held by Agit Kabayel
Awards
Previous: Gary Russell Jr.	ESPN Prospect of the Year; 2012	Next: Vasyl Lomachenko
