= England Boxing National Amateur Championships Super-Heavyweight Champions =

English Boxing competition

England Boxing National Amateur Championships Super-Heavyweight Champions (+90kg)
- Status: active
- Genre: Boxing
- Frequency: annual
- Inaugurated: 1982
- Organiser: England Boxing

The England Boxing National Amateur Championships Super-Heavyweight Championship formerly known as the ABA Championships is the primary English amateur boxing championship. It had previously been contested by all the nations of the United Kingdom.

== History ==
The super-heavyweight division was inaugurated in 1982 and is currently the weight category of over 90 Kg. The championships are highly regarded in the boxing world and seen as the most prestigious national amateur championships.

== Past winners ==
Year	Winner	Club
1982	Adrian Elliott	Fairburn House ABC
1983	Keith Ferdinand	Royal Navy
1984	Bobby Wells	Kingston ABC
1985	Guy Williamson	Fitzroy Lodge ABC
1986	James Oyebola	All Stars ABC
1987	James Oyebola	All Stars ABC
1988	Kevin McCormack	Coed Eva ABC
1989	Pat Passley	Lynn ABC
1990	Kevin McCormack	Coed Eva ABC
1991	Kevin McCormack	Coed Eva ABC
1992	Michael Hopper	Spennymoor ABC
1993	Michael McKenzie	Birmingham City ABC
1994	Danny Watts	Army
1995	Rodderick Allen	Preston & Fulwood ABC
1996	Danny Watts	Army
1997	Audley Harrison	Repton ABC
1998	Audley Harrison	Repton ABC
1999	Bill Bessey	Hartlepool Boys ABC
2000	John McDermott	St. Pancras ABC
2001	Matthew Grainger	Woking ABC
2002	Matthew Grainger	Woking ABC
2003	David Price	Salisbury ABC
2004	Joe Young	Repton ABC
2005	David Price	Salisbury ABC
2006	Derek Chisora	Finchley ABC
2007	David Price	Salisbury ABC
2008	Tyson Fury	Jimmy Egan's ABC
2009	Simon Vallily	South Bank ABC
2010	Anthony Joshua	Finchley ABC
2011	Anthony Joshua	Finchley ABC
2012	Joseph Joyce	Earlsfield ABC
2013	Anthony Richardson	Army
2014	Joseph Joyce	Earlsfield ABC
2015	Frazer Clarke	Burton ABC
2016	Alex Dickinson	Kirkby ABC
2017	Solomon Dacres	Warley ABC
2018	Chez Nihell	UKAF
2019	Delicious Orie	Jewellery Quarter
2020	cancelled due to COVID 19.	
2021	Ike Ogbo	Border City
2022	Harvey Dykes	Hillcrest
2023	Gideon Antwi	Hoddesdon
2024	Derrick Osadolor	Heart of Portsmouth
2025	Matthew Williams	Acocks Green
2026	Clinton Achusim	Longsight
