= Scott Belshaw =

Irish boxer (born 1985)

Personal information
- Nickname: "Ding Ding"
- Born: Scott Belshaw; 8 July 1985 (age 41) Aghalee, Northern Ireland
- Weight: heavyweight

Boxing career
- Stance: orthodox

Boxing record
- Total fights: 18
- Wins: 10
- Win by KO: 7
- Losses: 8

Scott Belshaw (born July 8, 1985 in Aghalee, Northern Ireland) is a professional boxer from Lisburn, Northern Ireland who fights in the heavyweight division.

== Amateur career ==
At amateur level, Belshaw fought for the Lisburn ABC in Lisburn and won five Irish titles and a number of Ulster championship titles. It was during his amateur days that Belshaw perfected his unorthodox style of fighting, known in some circles as the angry dancing Andrew 'Andy' Fyfe technique. After what Belshaw considered a poor decision during a quarter final fight of the 2006 Irish seniors championship when he was disqualified for holding despite being ten points up in a fight with Michael McDonagh, Belshaw left the amateur ranks and decided to become a professional with Frank Maloney.

== Professional career ==
=== Debut ===
Belshaw turned professional in October 2006 in Belfast, Northern Ireland on an undercard of bill that included James Gorman and Martin Rogan. In his debut Belshaw defeated fellow debutant Englishman Lee Webb with a brutal first round knockout within the first ten seconds of the fight. At this point in his career Belshaw had seven professional wins, six coming by knockout and was starting to gain attention as a prospect to watch for in the future (even appearing on channel four programme transworld sport where his manager Frank Maloney tipped him to be the next Lennox Lewis). However in 2008 he was defeated by journeyman Daniel Peret. Belshaw gained revenge on Peret in a rematch. On 23 May 2009, Belshaw fought Tyson Fury, and was stopped in the second round.

=== Prizefighter ===
Belshaw has signed to take part in the 'Prizefighter: The Heavyweights III' tournament on October 2, 2009. The contest includes fellow heavyweights Danny Williams, Michael Sprott and Audley Harrison - whom Belshaw faced at the quarter final stage. He was beaten by the eventual winner Audley Harrison.
