= Coleman Barrett =

Irish boxer

Personal information
- Nicknames: Colie, The Irish Stallion
- Nationality: Irish
- Born: 10 November 1982 (age 43) Galway, Ireland
- Height: 6 ft 1 in (1.85 m)
- Weight: Heavyweight

Boxing career
- Stance: Southpaw

Boxing record
- Total fights: 14
- Wins: 13
- Win by KO: 2
- Losses: 1

Coleman Barrett (born 10 November 1982) is an Irish former professional boxer who competed from 2003 to 2010. At regional level, he held the Irish heavyweight title in 2010.

== Prizefighter ==
Coleman competed in the Prizefighter series on 2 October 2009 at the ExCeL London, London Docklands, London. He made his way to the final as a 25/1 outsider, beating Scott Gammer and Carl Baker, losing to Audley Harrison by TKO in round 2 of 3. Barrett recently won the Irish heavyweight title against Colin Kenna.

== Prizefighter summary ==
Result	Opponent	Type	Round	Notes
Won	Scott Gammer	UD	3	Quarter Final
Won	Carl Baker	UD	3	Semi Final
Lost	Audley Harrison	TKO	2	Final
