= Scott Gammer =

Wales boxer

Personal information
- Nickname: The Hammer
- Born: Scott Gammer; 24 October 1976 (age 50) Pembroke, Wales
- Height: 6 ft 3 in (191 cm)
- Weight: Heavyweight

Boxing career
- Reach: 78 in (198 cm)
- Stance: Orthodox

Boxing record
- Total fights: 24
- Wins: 18
- Win by KO: 9
- Losses: 5
- Draws: 1

Scott Gammer (born 24 October 1976) is a Welsh former professional boxer who competed from 2002 to 2009. At regional level, he held the British heavyweight title from 2006 to 2007.

== Professional career ==
Gammer turned professional in 2002 and is currently trained by his father Ralph Gammer and managed by Paul Boyce.

On 16 June 2006, after 16 professional fights undefeated, he earned the right to challenge Mark Krence for the British Heavyweight Title. Gammer won in the 9th round via TKO.

In his first defence of the title on 13 October 2006 he defeated Micky Steeds by a unanimous points decision. Steeds was brought in as a replacement for Danny Williams, who was the mandatory challenger for the British Heavyweight Championship at the time, however he pulled out of the fight due to the date coinciding with Ramadan.

A second title defence against Williams was originally scheduled for 9 February 2007, however the fight was re-arranged due to Williams' defeat by Audley Harrison on 9 December 2006. Gammer finally fought Williams on 2 March 2007 at the Neath Sports Centre, Glamorgan. Williams won the bout by 9th-round KO, giving Gammer his first ever defeat as a professional.

Gammer had an opportunity to fight for the British title once again when he boxed John McDermott later that year in an elimination bout. The contest took place in Sheffield but ended up with another defeat for the Welshman. Following this setback Gammer announced his retirement from boxing and McDermott went on to challenge for the title. The retirement did not last that long however as Gammer returned to action in August 2008 when he challenged Francesco Pianeta for the EU Heavyweight championship in Germany. The fight ended with another defeat for Gammer, although this time it was due to a corner retirement when Gammer broke his hand in the 2nd round. Despite the injury Gammer fought bravely and looked good throughout until the handicap became too much and his corner pulled him out. Gammer fought twice in 2009. In May he was knocked out by unbeaten Finnish prospect Robert Helenius. In October he entered the Prizefighter tournament and was beaten in his quarter final match against Coleman Barrett, who went on to reach the final.

== Professional boxing record ==
24 fights	18 wins	5 losses
By knockout	9	3
By decision	9	2
Draws	1	

No.	Result	Record	Opponent	Type	Round, time	Date	Location	Notes
24	Loss	18–5–1	Coleman Barrett	UD	3	2 Oct 2009	ExCel Arena, London, England	Prizefighter: The Heavyweights III - Quarter-final
23	Loss	18–4–1	Robert Helenius	KO	6 (10), 1:52	30 May 2009	Hartwall Areena, Helsinki, Finland	
22	Loss	18–3–1	Francesco Pianeta	RTD	8 (12)	30 Aug 2008	Max-Schmeling-Halle, Prenzlauer Berg, Berlin, Germany	For vacant European Union heavyweight title
21	Loss	18–2–1	John McDermott	PTS	10	29 Sep 2007	Hallam FM Arena, Sheffield, England	
20	Win	18–1–1	Paul King	PTS	6	10 Jun 2007	Neath Sports Centre, Neath, Wales	
19	Loss	17–1–1	Danny Williams	KO	9 (12), 1:58	2 Mar 2007	Neath Sports Centre, Neath, Wales	Lost British heavyweight title
18	Win	17–0–1	Micky Steeds	UD	12	13 Oct 2006	Afan Lido, Port Talbot, Wales	Retained British heavyweight title
17	Win	16–0–1	Mark Krence	TKO	9 (12), 2:35	16 Jun 2006	Carmarthen Showgrounds, Carmarthen, Wales	Won vacant British heavyweight title
16	Win	15–0–1	Suren Kalachyan	PTS	6	10 Dec 2005	ExCel Arena, London, England	
15	Win	14–0–1	Julius Francis	PTS	8	30 Sep 2005	Carmarthen Showgrounds, Carmarthen, Wales	
14	Win	13–0–1	Mark Krence	TKO	8 (10), 2:00	15 May 2005	Octagon Centre, Sheffield, England	
13	Win	12–0–1	Micky Steeds	PTS	6	18 Feb 2005	Hotel Metropole Sporting Club, Brighton, England	
12	Win	11–0–1	Roman Bugaj	TKO	2 (6), 1:50	5 Nov 2004	Leisure Centre, Hereford, England	
11	Win	10–0–1	Carl Baker	PTS	4	17 Sep 2004	Plymouth Pavilions, Plymouth, England	
10	Win	9–0–1	Paul King	TKO	3 (6), 1:22	2 Jun 2004	Leisure Centre, Hereford, England	
9	Win	8–0–1	Paul Buttery	KO	1 (6), 1:05	1 May 2004	Leisure Centre, Bridgend, Wales	
8	Win	7–0–1	James Zikic	PTS	6	28 Feb 2004	Leisure Centre, Bridgend, Wales	
7	Draw	6–0–1	Mindaugas Kulikauskas	PTS	6	8 Nov 2003	Leisure Centre, Bridgend, Wales	
6	Win	6–0	Derek McCafferty	PTS	6	13 Sep 2003	Newport Leisure Centre, Newport, Wales	
5	Win	5–0	Dave Clarke	TKO	1 (4), 1:37	28 Jun 2003	Cardiff International Arena, Cardiff, Wales	
4	Win	4–0	Ahmed Cheleh	KO	1 (4), 3:08	25 Jan 2003	Leisure Centre, Bridgend, Wales	
3	Win	3–0	Dave Clarke	PTS	4	8 Jan 2003	Sobell Sports Centre, Aberdare, Wales	
2	Win	2–0	James Gilbert	KO	1	26 Oct 2002	Leisure Centre, Maesteg, Wales	
1	Win	1–0	Leighton Morgan	TKO	1	15 Sep 2002	Swansea Leisure Centre, Swansea, Wales	
