= Sergey Kuzmin (boxer) =

Russian boxer

Personal information
- Born: 24 June 1987 (age 39) Kolchugino, Russia
- Height: 191 cm (6 ft 3 in)
- Weight: Heavyweight

Boxing career
- Reach: 191 cm (75 in)

Boxing record
- Total fights: 23
- Wins: 19
- Win by KO: 14
- Losses: 3
- No contests: 1
Medal record
Men's amateur boxing
Representing Russia
European Championships
Gold medal – first place	2010 Moscow	Super-heavyweight
Silver medal – second place	2013 Minsk	Super-heavyweight
Russian National Championships
Gold medal – first place	2011 Ufa	Super-heavyweight
Silver medal – second place	2012 Syktyvkar	Super-heavyweight
Bronze medal – third place	2014 Rostov-on-Don	Super-heavyweight
Strandzha Cup
Gold medal – first place	Yambol 2010	Super-heavyweight

Sergey Vasilevich Kuzmin (born 24 June 1987) is a Russian professional boxer. As an amateur, he won a gold and silder medal at the 2010 and 2013 European Championships.

== Amateur career ==
At the 2011 World Amateur Boxing Championships he lost to unsung Mohamed Arjaoui.

== Professional career ==
=== Kuzmin vs. Dawejko ===
On 9 March 2019, Kuzmin faced Joey Dawejko. Kuzmin won the fight via majority decision, 96–94, 96–94 and 95–95 on the scorecards.

=== Kuzmin vs. Hunter ===
In his next bout, Kuzmin faced Michael Hunter (17–1). Hunter was ranked #9 by the WBA, #10 by the IBF, #12 by the WBO and #14 by the WBC. Hunter won the fight convincingly on the scorecards, 117–110, 117–110 and 117–110.

=== Kuzmin vs. Bakole ===
In his next bout, Kuzmin fought Martin Bakole (15–1). Bakole managed to secure the victory via unanimous decision victory, 98–92, 97–93 and 96–94 on the scorecards.

== Professional boxing record ==
23 fights	19 wins	3 losses
By knockout	14	1
By decision	5	2
No contests	1	

No.	Result	Record	Opponent	Type	Round, time	Date	Location	Notes
23	Loss	19–3 (1)	Murad Khalidov	KO	7 (8), 1:28	6 Oct 2025	KSK Arena, Saint Petersburg, Russia	
22	Win	19–2 (1)	German Garcia Montes	RTD	8 (10), 3:00	20 Jul 2023	SKA Arena, Saint Petersburg, Russia	
21	Win	18–2 (1)	Tian Fick	UD	10	24 Sep 2022	Sibur Arena, Saint Petersburg, Russia	
20	Win	17–2 (1)	Richard Lartey	KO	1 (10), 2:12	27 May 2022	Concert Hall Mir, Moscow, Russia	
19	Win	16–2 (1)	Igor Macedo	TKO	10 (10), 2:58	26 Nov 2021	REN TV Studio, Moscow, Russia	
18	Loss	15–2 (1)	Martin Bakole	UD	10	12 Dec 2020	The SSE Arena London, England	For vacant WBC International heavyweight title
17	Loss	15–1 (1)	Michael Hunter	UD	12	13 Sep 2019	The Theater at Madison Square Garden, New York City, New York, U.S.	Lost WBA Inter-Continental heavyweight title
16	Win	15–0 (1)	Joey Dawejko	MD	10	9 Mar 2019	Turning Stone Resort & Casino, Verona, New York, U.S.	Retained WBA Inter-Continental heavyweight title
15	Win	14–0 (1)	LaRon Mitchell	TKO	6 (12), 2.37	24 Nov 2018	Hard Rock Hotel & Casino, Atlantic City, New Jersey, U.S.	Retained WBA Inter-Continental heavyweight title
14	Win	13–0 (1)	David Price	RTD	4 (10), 3:00	22 Sep 2018	Wembley Stadium, London, England	Won vacant WBA Inter-Continental heavyweight title
13	Win	12–0 (1)	Jeremiah Karpency	KO	6 (8), 1:57	21 Apr 2018	Kings Theatre, New York City, New York, U.S.	
12	NC	11–0 (1)	Amir Mansour	NC	3 (12), 2:45	27 Nov 2017	Luzhniki Stadium, Moscow, Russia	For vacant WBC International heavyweight title; Originally ruled a TD, later ruled a NC after Mansour failed a drug test
11	Win	11–0	Malcolm Tann	KO	4 (8), 1:19	23 Jun 2017	Doubletree Hotel, Ontario, California, U.S.	
10	Win	10–0	Keenan Hickman	RTD	3 (8), 3:00	14 Apr 2017	MGM National Harbor, Oxon Hill, Maryland, U.S.	
9	Win	9–0	Vaclav Pejsar	TKO	2 (10), 2:58	23 Feb 2017	Forum, Nizhny Tagil, Russia	Won vacant Eurasia Pacific Boxing Council heavyweight title
8	Win	8–0	Mike Sheppard	TKO	1 (10), 2:58	29 Oct 2016	Arena, Ekaterinburg, Russia	
7	Win	7–0	Konstantin Airich	TKO	2 (10), 2:17	8 Apr 2016	Soviet Wings Sport Palace, Moscow, Russia	Won vacant Eurasia Pacific Boxing Council heavyweight title
6	Win	6–0	Rodney Hernandez	UD	10	18 Feb 2016	The Hangar, Costa Mesa, California, U.S.	
5	Win	5–0	Irineu Beato Costa Junior	KO	3 (10), 2:21	13 Nov 2015	Boxing & Gym Academy, Moscow, Russia	
4	Win	4–0	Darnell Wilson	TKO	4 (8), 2:57	27 Aug 2015	The Hangar, Costa Mesa, California, U.S.	
3	Win	3–0	Marcelo Nascimento	UD	8	22 Jun 2015	Boxing & Gym Academy, Moscow, Russia	
2	Win	2–0	Emilio Ezequiel Zarate	UD	6	1 Mar 2015	Boxing & Gym Academy, Moscow, Russia	
1	Win	1–0	Nicholas Buule	KO	1 (6), 1:47	28 Nov 2014	Luzhniki Stadium, Moscow, Russia	
