= Carl Baker (boxer) =

English boxer

Personal information
- Nickname: The Fridge
- Born: 3 January 1982 (age 44) Sheffield, Yorkshire, England
- Height: 6 ft 4 in (193 cm)
- Weight: Heavyweight

Boxing career
- Stance: Southpaw

Boxing record
- Total fights: 18
- Wins: 10
- Win by KO: 7
- Losses: 8
Medal record
Men's amateur boxing
Representing England
English National Championships
Bronze medal – third place	2003 Houghton-le-Spring	Super-heavyweight

Carl Baker (born 3 January 1982) is a British former professional boxer who competed from 2003 to 2014.

== Professional career ==
Baker made his professional debut on 6 September 2003, stopping Dave Clarke in the first round. The highlight of Baker's career was competing in the heavyweight edition of the Prizefighter series on 2 October 2009. He entered the tournament as an outsider, but defeated one of the favourites—Danny Williams—by unanimous decision (UD) in the opening round, while also scoring two knockdowns against Williams in the first round of their fight. In the semi-final, Baker was eliminated after losing a UD to Coleman Barrett.

On 13 February 2010, Baker fought Derek Chisora in a British title eliminator, with the winner to face Williams. Chisora grabbed and kissed Baker at the weigh-in for the fight. Chisora stopped Baker in the second round.

== Professional boxing record ==
18 fights	10 wins	8 losses
By knockout	7	4
By decision	3	4

No.	Result	Record	Opponent	Type	Round, time	Date	Location	Notes
18	Loss	10–8	Eddie Chambers	RTD	3 (8), 3:00	17 May 2014	Town Hall, Leeds, England	
17	Win	10–7	Paulius Kasiulevicius	TKO	1 (4), 2:46	18 Oct 2013	York Hall, London, England	
16	Loss	9–7	Carl Spencer	PTS	6	21 Sep 2013	Octagon Centre, Sheffield, England	
15	Loss	9–6	Edmund Gerber	TKO	1 (8), 1:44	7 May 2011	Jahnsportforum, Neubrandenburg, Germany	
14	Loss	9–5	Derek Chisora	TKO	2 (10), 2:13	13 Feb 2010	Wembley Arena, London, England	
13	Loss	9–4	Coleman Barrett	UD	3	2 Oct 2009	ExCeL, London, England	Prizefighter 8: heavyweight semi-final
12	Win	9–3	Danny Williams	UD	3	2 Oct 2009	ExCeL, London, England	Prizefighter 8: heavyweight quarter-final
11	Win	8–3	Chris Woollas	PTS	6	9 May 2009	Showground, Lincoln, England	
10	Win	7–3	David Ingleby	TKO	4 (4), 0:40	13 May 2006	Ponds Forge, Sheffield, England	
9	Win	6–3	Luke Simpkin	PTS	10	11 Sep 2005	Festival Hall Leisure Centre, Kirkby in Ashfield, England	Retained British Masters heavyweight title
8	Win	5–3	Scott Lansdowne	TKO	8 (10), 0:34	25 Jun 2005	Cattle Market, Melton Mowbray, England	Won vacant British Masters heavyweight title
7	Loss	4–3	Luke Simpkin	TKO	4 (6), 1:58	26 Apr 2005	Elland Road Banqueting Suite, Leeds, England	
6	Win	4–2	Paul King	TKO	2 (6), 1:17	4 Mar 2005	Magna Science Adventure Centre, Rotherham, England	
5	Loss	3–2	Scott Gammer	PTS	4	17 Sep 2004	Pavilions, Plymouth, England	
4	Loss	3–1	Paul King	PTS	6	3 Apr 2004	Waltheof Sports Centre, Sheffield, England	
3	Win	3–0	Alvin Miller	KO	1 (4), 0:40	28 Nov 2003	Sports Arena, Hull, England	
2	Win	2–0	Billy Wilson	TKO	2 (6), 1:35	15 Sep 2003	Queens Hotel, Leeds, England	
1	Win	1–0	Dave Clarke	TKO	1 (6)	6 Sep 2003	Beach Ballroom, Aberdeen, Scotland	
