= Rostislav Plechko =

Russian boxer

Rostislav Borisovich Plechko Ростислав Борисович Плечко
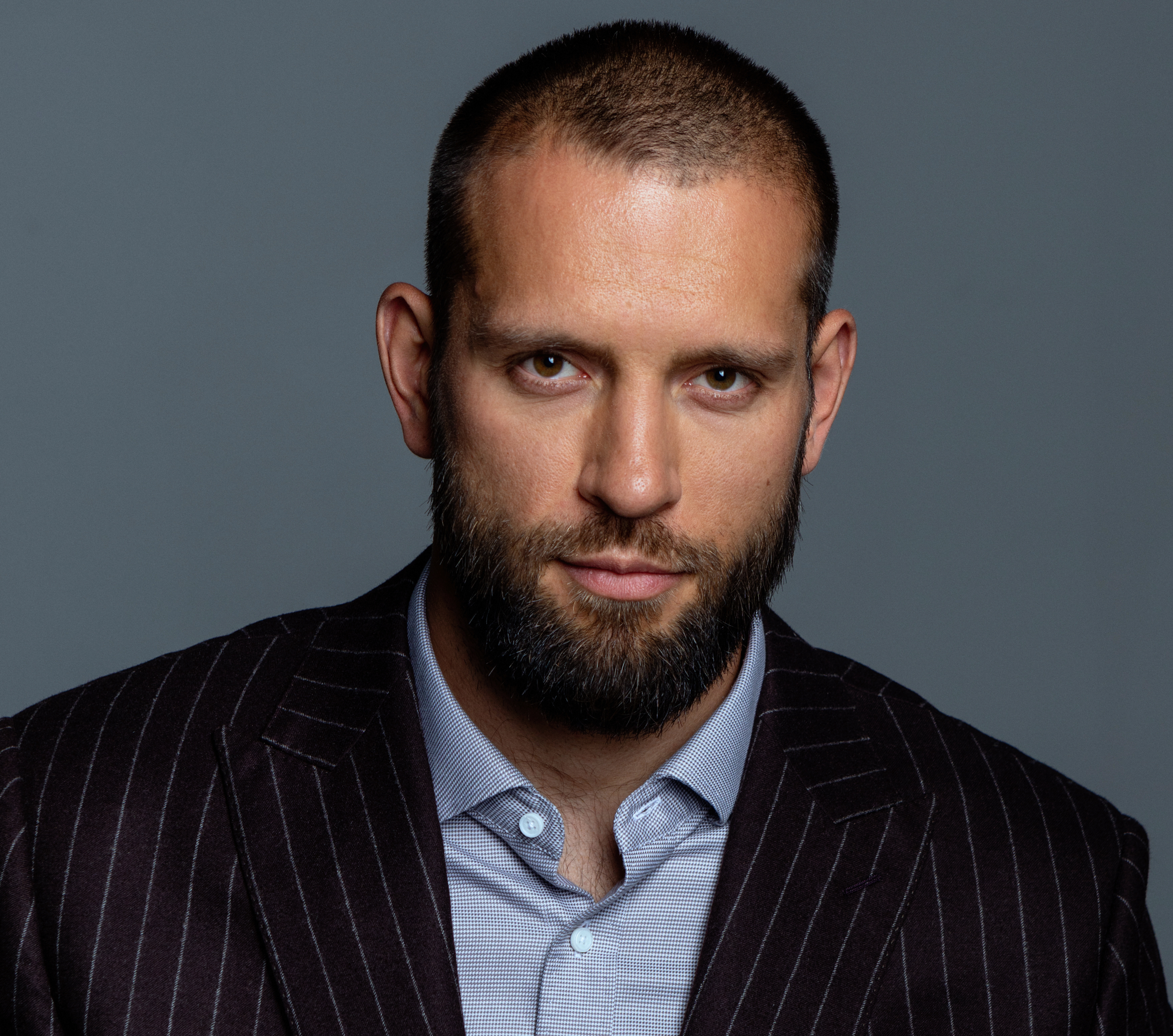

Personal information
- Nickname: The Russian Nightmare
- Nationality: Russian
- Born: January 5, 1989 (age 37) Saint Petersburg, Russia
- Height: 6 ft 2 1/2 in (189 cm)
- Weight: Heavyweight

Boxing career
- Stance: Southpaw

Boxing record
- Total fights: 13
- Wins: 13
- Win by KO: 13
- Losses: 0
- Draws: 0

Rostislav Borisovich Plechko (Russian: Ростислав Борисович Плечко; born 5 January 1989) is a Russian professional boxer who currently holds the Russian and WBA Asia heavyweight titles.

Rostislav Plechko was born in Saint-Petersburg, Russia. A severe pelvis joint trauma was revealed at birth, and despite doctors recommending an urgent surgery, his parents decided to treat their son themselves, and at the age of six, he began walking without any restrictions. After achieving a sports degree in canoeing, he became the Saint-Petersburg City Canoeing champion making it to the final of Russia State Championship. He quit canoeing at the age of fourteen, and just two years later he was enrolled to SPBGU University, and began to attend boxing classes at the university's amateur boxing club.

== Boxing career ==
As an amateur boxer, Plechko was awarded the Saint-Petersburg heavyweight title. He made his professional boxing debut on February 27, 2016, after defeating Sedrak Agagulyan in the first round. Plechko went on to win nine additional fights (and all of which were knockouts within the first round), including victories against Evgeny Orlov and Bernard Adie. On June 10, 2017, Rostislav became the Russian heavyweight champion by stopping Vladimir Goncharov in the first round. After defeating Goncharov, Plechko went on to win the WBA Asia heavyweight title from Ibrahim Labaran on September 7, 2017. In his most recent fight, Plechko stopped Brazilian heavyweight Irineu Beato Costa Junior in the first round. Plechko's professional record currently stands at 13 wins, 0 losses, 0 draws and 13 wins by knockout (all of which were stoppages in the first round). He also had a two out of five star rating on BoxRec but is currently unrated with his status listed as inactive, due to not having fought for over one full year.

Plechko is currently coached by Alexander Zimin (Russian: Александр Зимин).

== Professional boxing record ==
13 fights	13 wins	0 losses
By knockout	13	0

No.	Result	Record	Opponent	Type	Round, time	Date	Location	Notes
13	Win	13–0	Irineu Beato Costa Junior	ТKO	1 (10), 1:07	25 Aug 2018	Usadba Familiya, Plastunovskaya, Russia	
12	Win	12–0	Ibrahim Labaran	ТKO	1 (10), 0:25	7 Sep 2017	Ice Sports Palace Kristall, Saratov, Russia	Won vacant WBA Asia heavyweight title
11	Win	11–0	Vladimir Goncharov	TKO	1 (10), 1:35	10 Jun 2017	Floyd Mayweather Boxing Academy, Zhukovka, Russia	Won vacant Russian heavyweight title
10	Win	10–0	Bernard Adie	KO	1 (10), 0:06	25 Mar 2017	Qin Shi Huang Restaurant, Saint Petersburg, Russia	
9	Win	9–0	Evgeny Orlov	TKO	1 (10), 0:57	12 Nov 2016	Palais des sports René-Bougnol, Montpellier, France	
8	Win	8–0	David Gegeshidze	TKO	1 (8), 2:35	21 Oct 2016	Saku Suurhall, Tallinn, Estonia	
7	Win	7–0	Valeri Semiskur	TKO	1 (10), 2:31	26 Aug 2016	Tough Fight Gym, Moscow, Russia	
6	Win	6–0	Sandor Balogh	TKO	1 (6), 1:04	31 Jul 2016	Arēna Rīga, Riga, Latvia	
5	Win	5–0	Nicholas Buule	KO	1 (6), 0:37	24 Jun 2016	Sport Service, Podolsk, Russia	
4	Win	4–0	Ostaps Basins	KO	1 (4), 0:54	22 Apr 2016	Pyynikin Palloiluhalli, Tampere, Finland	
3	Win	3–0	Nurullo Mirzaev	RTD	1 (4), 3:00	10 Apr 2016	Alexander Morozov Boxing School, Saint Petersburg, Russia	
2	Win	2–0	Olegs Lopajevs	TKO	1 (4), 0:29	1 Apr 2016	Viihdemaailma Ilona, Oulu, Finland	
1	Win	1–0	Sedrak Agagulyan	RTD	1 (4), 3:00	27 Feb 2016	Alexander Morozov Boxing School, Saint Petersburg, Russia	

Sporting positions
Regional boxing titles
Preceded by Ruslan Fayer	Russian heavyweight champion 10 June 2017 – present	Succeeded by Incumbent
Inaugural champion awarded title	WBA Asia heavyweight champion 7 September 2017 – 5 September 2018	Vacant Title next held by Apti Davtaev
