= Pat Passley =

Retired British boxer

Personal information
- Nationality: United Kingdom
- Born: 10 October 1965 (age 60) London

Sport
- Sport: Boxing

Patrick 'Pat' Passley (born 1965) is a retired British boxer.

== Boxing career ==
Passley was the English National Champion in 1989, when boxing for the Lynn ABC he won the prestigious ABA super-heavyweight championship.

He represented England in the +91 kg super-heavyweight division, at the 1990 Commonwealth Games in Auckland, New Zealand.

He turned professional on 25 October 1994 and fought in 4 fights.
