= Audley Harrison =

English boxer (born 1971)

Audley Harrison MBE
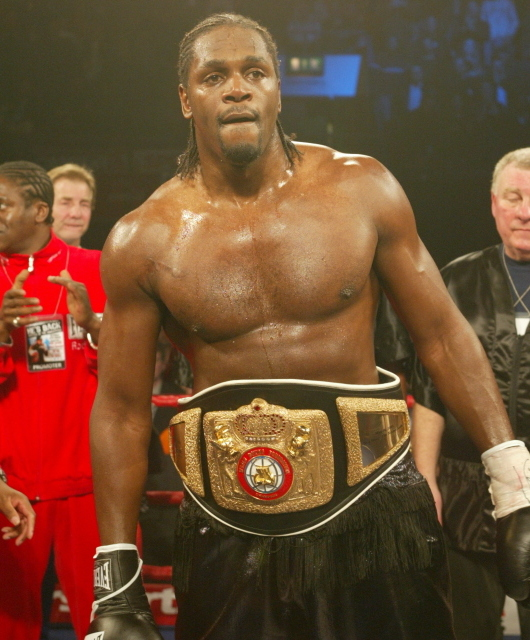
- Harrison in 2004

Personal information
- Nickname: A-Force
- Born: Audley Hugh Harrison; 26 October 1971 (age 55) Park Royal, London, England
- Height: 6 ft 5 1/2 in (197 cm)
- Weight: Heavyweight

Boxing career
- Reach: 86 in (218 cm)
- Stance: Southpaw

Boxing record
- Total fights: 38
- Wins: 31
- Win by KO: 23
- Losses: 7
Medal record
Men's amateur boxing
Olympic Games
Representing Great Britain
Gold medal – first place	2000 Sydney	Super-heavyweight
Commonwealth Games
Representing England
Gold medal – first place	1998 Kuala Lumpur	Super-heavyweight

Audley Hugh Harrison, MBE (born 26 October 1971) is a British former professional boxer who competed from 2001 to 2013. He challenged once for the WBA heavyweight title in 2010. At regional level, he held the European heavyweight title in 2010; and challenged twice for the Commonwealth heavyweight title in 2005 and 2012, and once for the British heavyweight title in 2012. He won the Prizefighter series in 2009 and 2013.

As an amateur, he won a gold medal at the 1998 Commonwealth Games and the 2000 Olympics.

== Early life and education ==
As a youth, Harrison was involved with street gangs and crime. After serving three years in prison for robbery and assault as a teenager, he decided to turn his life around, dedicating himself to boxing and education. He earned degrees in sports science and leisure management from the Brunel University of London.

== Amateur career ==
Boxing out of Repton Amateur Boxing Club in Bethnal Green, London, Harrison became British super heavyweight champion in 1997, defeating Nick Kendall in the final. He retained the title in 1998, defeating Dean Redmond, and won gold at the 1998 Commonwealth Games beating Michael Macquae of Mauritius in the final. In 2000 he won gold at the Sydney Olympics by defeating Mukhtarkhan Dildabekov of Kazakhstan on points. After his medal win, Harrison was awarded an MBE.

=== Highlights ===
- 1998 at the European Super Heavyweight Championships in Minsk, Belarus, lost to Serguei Lyakhovich (Belarus)
- 1998 Commonwealth Games Super Heavyweight Gold Medalist. Results were:
  - Defeated Fai Falamoe (New Zealand) points
  - Defeated Jim Whitehead (Australia) KO 3
  - Defeated Michael Macquae (Mauritius) KO 1
- 1999 competed at the World Championships in Houston, United States. Results were:
  - Defeated Lazizbek Zokirov (Uzbekistan) points
  - Lost to Sinan Samil Sam (Turkey) points
- Won the Super Heavyweight Gold Medal representing Great Britain at the 2000 Olympics in Sydney, Australia. Results were:
  - Defeated Alexei Lezin (Russia) TKO 4
  - Defeated Alexey Mazikin (Ukraine) points
  - Defeated Paolo Vidoz (Italy) points
  - Defeated Mukhtarkhan Dildabekov (Kazakhstan) points

== Professional career ==
=== Early career ===
In 2001, Harrison released his autobiography Realising the Dream and set up his own company, A Force Promotions, to manage his career and concluded several high-profile sponsorships deals and became the first boxer in Britain to sign a direct broadcast deal.

He signed a £1 million deal with the BBC to show his first ten professional fights.

His debut was against US club fighter Michael Middleton, whom Harrison knocked out in the first round in Wembley Arena with 6 million viewers watching at home. He was then out of action for several months with an injury, but by the end of the year outpointed Briton Derek McCafferty over six rounds.

Harrison continued to win and made his United States debut in November 2002, knocking out Shawn Robinson in the 1st round. In February 2003 he beat US fighter Rob Calloway in four rounds, and outpointed Ratko Draskovic over eight rounds. Harrison then knocked out Matt Ellis in two rounds. Harrison then tried to arrange a fight with 41-year-old ex-World champion Frank Bruno, who had been retired for seven years. A dispute at York Hall, Bethnal Green with Herbie Hide after the Ellis fight resulted in a riot. The proposed Frank Bruno fight collapsed shortly afterwards, when Bruno was sectioned under the Mental Health Act. Harrison and Hide were both penalised by the British Boxing Board of Control for the riot.

Following the Ellis riot, Harrison relocated to the USA where he was unbeaten in 11 fights, with 8 knockouts. In the 2003 November issue of the Ring Magazine, Harrison was tipped to emulate Lennox Lewis and become a dominant world champion.

He had three more fights in 2003, against Lisandro Diaz (KO4), Quinn Navarre (KO3), and Brian Nix (KO3), in America. Harrison was sparring regularly with experienced world class Heavyweights like Vaughn Bean.

Harrison returned to the UK in 2004, but instead of fighting new British champion Michael Sprott for the British title, he fought unbeaten Dutch fighter Richel Hersisia for the World Boxing Foundation (WBFo) World belt. He knocked out Hersisia in 4 rounds. He defended the title twice: a 12-round points win over late-sub Julius Francis, and a 9th-round TKO of unbeaten Tomasz Bonin. After suffering a serious ligament tear in his left hand requiring hand surgery in New York, Harrison did not fight for almost a year.

Harrison's contract was not renewed in 2004 and the BBC stopped broadcasting professional boxing.

Harrison returned to the ring in June 2005, knocking out Robert Davis (KO7) and Robert Wiggins (KO4). On The Best Damn Sports Show Period he said he was now ready to step up and face world class opponents and get a title shot.

=== First Commonwealth title challenge ===
==== Harrison vs. Williams ====
Harrison returned to the UK in December to face long-time bitter rival Danny Williams in London for the Commonwealth title. Harrison stepped in after Matt Skelton had pulled out and took the bout on five weeks notice. Harrison lost a close, split decision.

=== Return to the ring ===
==== Harrison vs. Guinn ====
In April 2006, Harrison fought in the US against Dominick Guinn and again lost on points. Harrison put the defeat down to loss of confidence from his defeat to Williams and insisted he would bounce back. In June, he scored a three-round knockout of Andrew Greeley in an off-TV fight in America, and was poised for a fight with Matt Skelton to try to resurrect his career. Skelton had beaten Danny Williams in July, winning the title Williams had earlier taken from Harrison. When Skelton dropped out only one week before the fight due to injury, Danny Williams replaced him.

==== Harrison vs. Williams II ====
Williams had trained 8 weeks for a fight with British champion Scott Gammer. This time Harrison fought far more aggressively, decking Williams twice and winning on a third-round knockout. Williams suffered a broken nose and severe lacerations, and Harrison was once again lauded as a contender for a world title. Following the victory over Williams, Harrison signed a promotional deal with Frank Warren, whose aim was to get Harrison a world title fight in 2007.

==== Harrison vs. Sprott ====
On 17 February 2007, Harrison was knocked out by Michael Sprott for the European Union title. This third professional loss left Harrison's future uncertain. Harrison claimed that he could make a comeback, but Warren suggested that any return to the ring would be for a reduced purse, since the public would have no great interest.

Harrison returned to fight Paul King for a bout scheduled for 29 September 2007 in Sheffield. However, he and his coach Kelvyn Travis were involved in a car accident on 21 September 2007 in the United States, and Harrison suffered injuries that caused the fight to be cancelled. Harrison had also suggested that a deal would be announced involving promoter Dennis Hobson, but the cancellation of the fight meant that a formal announcement was on hold. Harrison underwent surgery for his injuries, and returned on 19 April 2008, beating the American Jason Barnett in the fifth round on the undercard of the Bernard Hopkins vs. Joe Calzaghe fight at the Thomas & Mack Center in Las Vegas, Nevada. This bout was the first of a new multi-bout agreement between Harrison and Warren, which aimed to get Harrison a world title shot in 2009.

==== Harrison vs. Rogan ====
After proposed matches with Samuel Peter and Martin Rogan fell through, on 6 September 2008 Harrison gained what the BBC described as "an unconvincing victory" over George Arias at the MEN Arena in Manchester. The fight was overshadowed by Amir Khan's first defeat later on the same card. On 6 December 2008, Harrison's career seemed all but over as he was defeated by the winner of the first Prizefighter tournament and Belfast taxi driver, Martin Rogan. The referee scored the contest 96–95 in favour of the Irishman.

=== Prizefighter champion ===
Harrison signed for the Prizefighter tournament, an eight-man, one-night knockout tournament that took place at ExCeL London on 2 October 2009. On 1 October 2009, he weighed in for Prizefighter at 18 stones and half a pound. He went on to win the tournament, by way of second round knock-out against Coleman Barrett. Before that, he had knocked out Scott Belshaw and won a unanimous decision over Danny Hughes. Following his success in the Prizefighter tournament, it was announced on 15 January 2010 that Harrison would face Albert Sosnowski for the European Boxing Union heavyweight title, with the fight set for 9 April 2010. However Sosnowski called the bout off for a shot at Vitali Klitschko's WBC title.

=== European champion ===
==== Harrison vs. Sprott II ====
On 9 April 2010, Harrison won the vacant EBU belt against old foe Michael Sprott at Alexandra Palace. He knocked out Sprott in the final round despite being behind on all three judges scorecards. Harrison claimed he sustained a shoulder injury early in the fight and had to carry on single-handed. BBC Sport said of the fight: "Having come within seconds of a defeat that would have made a mockery of pre-fight assertions that he could face one of the Klitschko brothers for a world title, Harrison said: 'I had to win it somehow.'"

On 24 April 2010, Harrison underwent surgery in Cheadle, Greater Manchester to repair the torn Pectoralis major muscle. The surgeon said he expected Harrison to make a "full recovery in about 12 to 16 weeks".

=== WBA heavyweight title challenge ===
==== Harrison vs. Haye ====
On 8 June 2010, Harrison vacated his European title, announcing his intention of getting a world title shot. He began negotiations with Hayemaker Promotions soon after, which culminated in a world-title fight in the M.E.N. Arena against WBA champion David Haye on 13 November 2010.

Harrison was defeated by Haye, with the fight being stopped in the third round after Harrison was unable to respond to a barrage of punches from Haye. Statistics from the fight showed that Harrison only landed a single punch in the entire duration of the contest.

Harrison was heavily criticised for his performance after the bout. British and Commonwealth champion Derek Chisora stated, "I'd never show my face again if I fought like that. It was pathetic. He disgraced himself and he disgraced British heavyweights, he shouldn't get paid the reported million pounds he is earning after that shambles." European light-heavyweight champion Nathan Cleverly also voiced his discontent with the fight, adding Harrison should now retire. Due to the nature of Harrison's defeat, the BBBofC withheld some of the fighter's purse while a full investigation of the bout was carried out. After the investigation into the fight was concluded, Harrison was granted his full purse on 11 January 2011.

On 3 December 2010, it was confirmed Harrison would continue his career as a professional boxer despite calls for him to retire. British and Commonwealth champion Derek Chisora was critical of the decision, stating, "He's going to box on, but who's going to buy the tickets to go and watch him? Even if he gives them to you for free are you going to go and watch? ... Good luck to Audley anyway."

On 15 November 2011, during an interview on BBC Breakfast following his departure from Strictly Come Dancing, Harrison announced that he would return to boxing for one last time saying "It could be over, but I just need to go and check." He stated his intention was to fight British Heavyweight Champion Tyson Fury in 2012.

Harrison returned to the ring on 26 May 2012 and boxed Ali Adams at the Brentwood Centre, Essex for the International Masters Championships. Harrison sent his opponent to the canvas with a right hand and although Adams managed to get to his feet, a flurry of follow-up shots from Harrison prompted the referee to step in and end the contest.

=== British title challenge ===
==== Harrison vs. Price ====
Harrison faced David Price on 13 October 2012, and lost the fight by knockout after 82 seconds of the first round. Harrison announced that he would not retire from boxing and will box on.

=== International prizefighter champion ===
On 23 February 2013 Harrison won the Prizefighter 29: The International Heavyweights III tournament, defeating Derric Rossy in the final.

=== Later career ===
==== Harrison vs. Wilder ====
On 27 April 2013, Harrison stepped into the ring to fight the unbeaten American prospect Deontay Wilder (27–0, 27 KOs). Wilder had not been beyond 4 rounds in his professional career. The bout only lasted a mere 70 seconds of the first round. Wilder landed a right hand which wobbled Harrison, Wilder then rushed in with a flurry of wild punches. Harrison was knocked down but managed to beat the count. However, the referee then stopped the bout, deeming Harrison unable to continue. Wilder won via TKO, his 28th consecutive knockout.

=== Retirement ===
On 1 May 2013, Harrison announced his retirement from boxing. However despite coming out of retirement just 20 days later, on 26 March 2014, Harrison announced he was no longer a professional boxer, and would not return to the ring.

== Outside boxing ==
On 6 September 2011, it was announced that Harrison would take part in the 2011 series of Strictly Come Dancing. Harrison and his dance partner Natalie Lowe made it to the seventh round of the contest before being voted out.

Harrison came second in the 2014 Summer edition of Celebrity Big Brother, and in 2016 he took part in Celebrity MasterChef.

== Personal life ==
Harrison is married to Raychel. They have a daughter Ariella and a son named Hudson.

=== Phone hacking mirror group newspapers ===
In 2016, Harrison was among 29 individuals whose legal claims against Mirror Group Newspapers were settled at the High Court, following allegations of unlawful phone hacking and related privacy breaches. The publisher agreed to pay more than £500,000 in settlements across the group of claimants, which included figures from sport, entertainment, and broadcasting. Mirror Group Newspapers acknowledged that unlawful interception of voicemail or other privacy violations had occurred and issued formal apologies, expressing regret for the actions and confirming that such practices would not be repeated.

== Professional boxing record ==
38 fights	31 wins	7 losses
By knockout	23	4
By decision	8	3

No.	Result	Record	Opponent	Type	Round, time	Date	Location	Notes
38	Loss	31–7	Deontay Wilder	TKO	1 (12), 1:10	27 Apr 2013	Motorpoint Arena, Sheffield, England	
37	Win	31–6	Derric Rossy	TKO	2 (3), 1:25	23 Mar 2013	York Hall, London, England	Prizefighter 29: heavyweight final
36	Win	30–6	Martin Rogan	UD	3	23 Mar 2013	York Hall, London, England	Prizefighter 29: heavyweight semi-final
35	Win	29–6	Claus Bertino	TKO	1 (3), 0:33	23 Mar 2013	York Hall, London, England	Prizefighter 29: heavyweight quarter-final
34	Loss	28–6	David Price	TKO	1 (12), 1:22	13 Oct 2012	Echo Arena, Liverpool, England	For British and Commonwealth heavyweight titles
33	Win	28–5	Ali Adams	TKO	4 (10), 0:45	26 May 2012	Brentwood Centre Arena, Brentwood, England	
32	Loss	27–5	David Haye	TKO	3 (12), 1:53	13 Nov 2010	MEN Arena, Manchester, England	For WBA heavyweight title
31	Win	27–4	Michael Sprott	KO	12 (12), 1:05	9 Apr 2010	Alexandra Palace, London, England	Won vacant European heavyweight title
30	Win	26–4	Coleman Barrett	TKO	2 (3), 2:40	2 Oct 2009	ExCeL, London, England	Prizefighter 8: heavyweight final
29	Win	25–4	Danny Hughes	UD	3	2 Oct 2009	ExCeL, London, England	Prizefighter 8: heavyweight semi-final
28	Win	24–4	Scott Belshaw	TKO	2 (3), 3:00	2 Oct 2009	ExCeL, London, England	Prizefighter 8: heavyweight quarter-final
27	Loss	23–4	Martin Rogan	PTS	10	6 Dec 2008	ExCeL, London, England	
26	Win	23–3	George Arias	PTS	10	6 Sep 2008	MEN Arena, Manchester, England	
25	Win	22–3	Jason Barnett	TKO	5 (8), 1:48	19 Apr 2008	Thomas & Mack Center, Paradise, Nevada, US	
24	Loss	21–3	Michael Sprott	KO	3 (12), 3:00	17 Feb 2007	Wembley Arena, London, England	For European Union and vacant English heavyweight titles
23	Win	21–2	Danny Williams	TKO	3 (12), 2:32	9 Dec 2006	ExCeL, London, England	
22	Win	20–2	Andrew Greeley	KO	3 (10), 2:32	9 Jun 2006	Tropicana Casino & Resort, Atlantic City, New Jersey, US	
21	Loss	19–2	Dominick Guinn	UD	10	14 Apr 2006	Agua Caliente Casino Resort Spa, Rancho Mirage, California, US	
20	Loss	19–1	Danny Williams	SD	12	10 Dec 2005	ExCeL, London, England	For vacant Commonwealth heavyweight title
19	Win	19–0	Robert Wiggins	TKO	4 (10), 3:00	18 Aug 2005	HP Pavilion, San Jose, California, US	
18	Win	18–0	Robert Davis	TKO	7 (10), 2:21	9 Jun 2005	Pechanga Resort & Casino, Temecula, California, US	
17	Win	17–0	Tomasz Bonin	TKO	9 (12), 2:17	19 Jun 2004	Alexandra Palace, London, England	Retained WBF (Foundation) heavyweight title
16	Win	16–0	Julius Francis	UD	12	8 May 2004	Whitchurch Leisure Centre, Bristol, England	Retained WBF (Foundation) heavyweight title
15	Win	15–0	Richel Hersisia	KO	4 (12), 2:00	20 Mar 2004	Wembley Arena, London, England	Won WBF (Foundation) heavyweight title
14	Win	14–0	Brian Nix	TKO	3 (10), 1:41	12 Dec 2003	Edgewater Hotel and Casino, Laughlin, Nevada, US	
13	Win	13–0	Lisandro Ezequiel Diaz	TKO	4 (8), 1:32	3 Oct 2003	Mandalay Bay Events Center, Paradise, Nevada, US	
12	Win	12–0	Quinn Navarre	KO	3 (8), 0:32	9 Sep 2003	Level Nightclub, Miami, Florida, US	
11	Win	11–0	Mathew Ellis	TKO	2 (8), 1:35	31 May 2003	York Hall, London, England	
10	Win	10–0	Ratko Draskovic	PTS	8	29 Mar 2003	Wembley Conference Centre, London, England	
9	Win	9–0	Rob Calloway	TKO	5 (8), 3:00	8 Feb 2003	Brentford Fountain Leisure Centre, London, England	
8	Win	8–0	Shawn Robinson	TKO	1 (6), 2:09	23 Nov 2002	Boardwalk Hall, Atlantic City, New Jersey, US	
7	Win	7–0	Wade Lewis	TKO	2 (6), 0:43	5 Oct 2002	Liverpool Olympia, Liverpool, England	
6	Win	6–0	Dominic Negus	PTS	6	10 Jul 2002	Wembley Conference Centre, London, England	
5	Win	5–0	Mark Krence	PTS	6	21 May 2002	ExCeL, London, England	
4	Win	4–0	Julius Long	KO	2 (6), 2:00	20 Apr 2002	Wembley Conference Centre, London, England	
3	Win	3–0	Piotr Jurczyk	TKO	2 (6), 1:24	20 Oct 2001	Kelvin Hall, Glasgow, Scotland	
2	Win	2–0	Derek McCafferty	PTS	6	22 Sep 2001	Telewest Arena, Newcastle, England	
1	Win	1–0	Mike Middleton	TKO	1 (6), 2:45	19 May 2001	Wembley Arena, London, England	

== Viewership ==
=== Germany ===
Date	Fight	Billing	Network	Viewership (avg.)	Source(s)
13 November 2010	David Haye vs. Audley Harrison	Best Of Enemies	Das Erste	4,170,000	
	Total viewership			4,170,000	

=== UK pay-per-view bouts ===
Date	Fight	Billing	Network	Pay-per-view buys	Source
13 November 2010	David Haye vs. Audley Harrison	Best Of Enemies	Sky Box Office	304,000	
	Total sales		Sky Box Office	304,000	

Sporting positions
Amateur boxing titles
Previous: Danny Watts	ABA super-heavyweight champion 1997–1998	Next: Billy Bessey
Regional boxing titles
Vacant Title last held by Albert Sosnowski	European heavyweight champion 9 April 2010 – July 2010; Vacated	Vacant Title next held by Alexander Dimitrenko
Minor world boxing titles
New title	WBF (Foundation) heavyweight champion 20 March 2004 – June 2005; Vacated	Vacant Title next held by Rob Calloway
Tournament boxing titles
Previous: Sam Sexton	Prizefighter 8: heavyweight champion 2 October 2009	Next: Michael Sprott
Previous: Tor Hamer	Prizefighter 29: heavyweight champion 23 February 2013	Next: Michael Sprott
