= Aghalee =

Village, townland and civil parish in County Antrim, Northern Ireland

Coordinates: 54.520235°N 6.271133°W

Aghalee: Irish: Achadh Lí
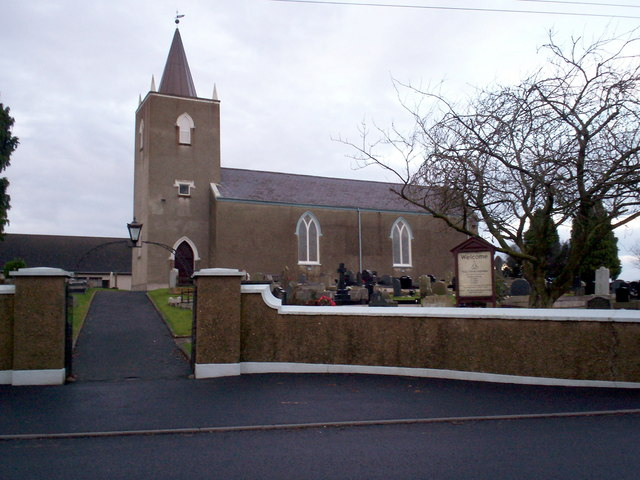
- Holy Trinity Church of Ireland, Aghalee

- Location within Northern Ireland
- Population: 919 (2021 census)
- District: Lisburn and Castlereagh
- County: County Antrim
- Country: Northern Ireland
- Sovereign state: United Kingdom
- Post town: CRAIGAVON
- Postcode district: BT67
- Dialling code: 028
- UK Parliament: Lagan Valley
- NI Assembly: Lagan Valley

Aghalee (from Irish Achadh Lí , meaning 'field of calves') is a village, townland and civil parish in County Antrim, Northern Ireland. It is three miles from the southeast corner of Lough Neagh on the main road between Lurgan and Antrim and about 13 kilometres west of Lisburn. The village lies on the steep wooded slopes of Friar's Glen and is beside the now disused Lagan Navigational Canal. As of the 2021 census, Aghalee had a population of 919.

Aghalee has several places of worship, a community hall, Orange Hall, GP Surgery, filling station and shop, a pharmacy and fast food takeaway. The village has a vocational training centre, a nursing home and a children's day nursery. Ulsterbus services link the village with Lisburn, Antrim, Lurgan and Belfast.

== History ==
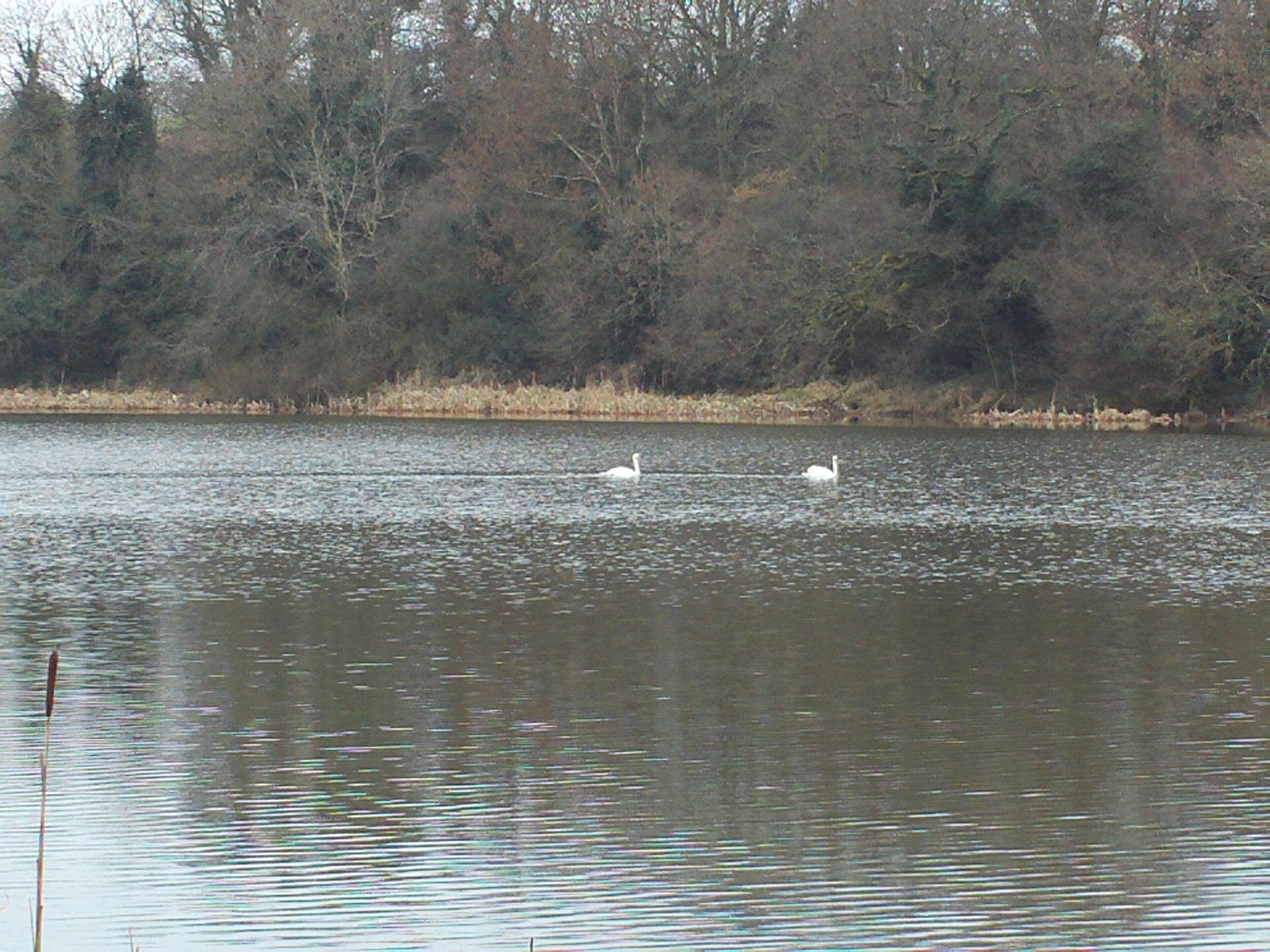
Lagan Navigation Canal (disused) at Broadwater, near Aghalee

Much of the early development of Aghalee was due to its location beside the Lagan Navigational Canal which opened at the end of the 18th century. The village became a distribution centre for the surrounding area and developed as an important lock station on the Lagan Navigation, as it was one of the last sizeable settlements before the canal entered Lough Neagh. While the canal operated, trade continued on a significant scale. When the canal ceased to operate in 1954, the area began to decline in commercial importance. The population of the settlement decreased considerably in the latter part of the 19th century and the first part of the 20th century.

The village retains a number of the 18th century structures and buildings belonging to the canal. From the 1970s, Aghalee developed as a commuter area for Belfast and Craigavon and this was accompanied by significant population growth.

== Demographics ==
Aghalee is classified as a "Small Village" or "Hamlet". On census day in 2001 (29 April 2001), there were 774 people living in Aghalee. Of these:

- 26.0% were aged under 16 years and 8.8% were aged 60 and over
- 51.2% of the population were male and 48.8% were female
- 10.6% were from a Catholic background and 85.0% were from a Protestant background
- 2.7% of people aged 16–74 were unemployed

As of the 2011 census, Aghalee had a population of 863. Of these:

- 15.2% were from a Catholic background and 74.7% were from a Protestant background

== Notable people ==
- Dolores Kelly (born 1959), Social Democratic and Labour Party (SDLP) politician, Member of the Northern Ireland Assembly (MLA) for Upper Bann 2003–2016, and again from 2017–2022.
- Hilary McGrady, CBE, the Director-General of the National Trust, lives just outside the village.
- Scott Belshaw (born 1985), professional boxer

== See also ==
- List of towns and villages in Northern Ireland
- List of civil parishes of County Antrim
