= Irineu Beato Costa Junior =

Brazilian boxer (born 1980)

Personal information
- Nickname: Negro Tey Gigante
- Born: 2 August 1980 (age 46) Osasco, São Paulo, Brazil
- Height: 6 ft 3 1/2 in (192 cm)
- Weight: Heavyweight

Boxing career
- Reach: 76 in (193 cm)
- Stance: Orthodox

Boxing record
- Total fights: 31
- Wins: 19
- Win by KO: 17
- Losses: 12

Irineu Beato Costa Junior (born 2 August 1980) is a Brazilian former professional boxer who competed from 2010 to 2022. At regional level, he challenged once for the PABA heavyweight title in 2014.

== Professional career ==
On 25 October 2014, it was announced that WBO No. 15 ranked contender, Beato Costa Junior, would fight WBO No. 6 ranked contender, Christian Hammer, as a late replacement for Taras Bidenko. Beato Costa Junior lost by unanimous decision with scores of 120–107, 120–108, and 120–108.

On 19 November 2014, it was announced that Beato Costa Junior would fight undefeated Joseph Parker (11–0, 9 KOs) on 6 December 2014. Beato Costa Junior and Parker had previously sparred in 2013. Beato Costa Junior lost by knockout (KO) in the fourth round.

On 21 January 2015, it was announced that Beato Costa Junior would fight David Price (18–2, 15 KOs) on 21 February 2015, on the undercard of Arthur Abraham's WBO super-middleweight title defence against Paul Smith. Beato Costa Junior lost by technical knockout (TKO) in the sixth round.

On 8 March 2015, it was announced that Beato Costa Junior would fight Denis Boytsov (35–1, 26 KOs) on 21 March 2015, on the undercard of Jürgen Brähmer's WBA (Regular) light-heavyweight title defence against Robin Krasniqi. Beato Costa Junior lost by corner retirement in the second round.

On 22 July 2015, it was announced that Beato Costa Junior would fight undefeated Dillian Whyte (14–0, 11 KOs) on 1 August 2015. Beato Costa Junior lost by TKO in the first round.

Beato Costa Junior faced undefeated Sergey Kuzmin (4–0, 2 KOs) on 13 November 2015, losing by KO in the third round.

Beato Costa Junior faced undefeated Otto Wallin (14–0, 10 KOs) on 23 April 2016, losing by TKO in the third round.

== Professional boxing record ==
31 fights	19 wins	12 losses
By knockout	17	11
By decision	2	1

No.	Result	Record	Opponent	Type	Round, time	Date	Location	Notes
31	Loss	19–12	Joe Cusumano	KO	1 (8), 1:20	24 Jun 2022	Twin River Event Center, Lincoln, Rhode Island, US	
30	Loss	19–11	Abdul-Kerim Edilov	KO	1 (4), 1:27	19 Sep 2019	Uvais Akhtaev Sports Palace, Grozny, Russia	
29	Loss	19–10	Hussein Muhamed	KO	1 (8), 1:58	14 Sep 2019	Verti Music Hall, Berlin, Germany	
28	Loss	19–9	Oleksandr Zakhozhyi	KO	3 (8), 1:43	15 Dec 2018	Parkovy Convention Centre, Kyiv, Ukraine	
27	Loss	19–8	Rostislav Plechko	TKO	1 (10), 1:07	25 Aug 2018	Usadba Familiya, Plastunovskaya, Russia	
26	Loss	19–7	Otto Wallin	TKO	3 (8), 0:35	23 Apr 2016	Hovet, Stockholm, Sweden	
25	Win	19–6	Leandro Santos Oliveira	TKO	1 (6), 1:37	20 Dec 2015	Centro Esportivo Tatuape, São Paulo, Brazil	
24	Loss	18–6	Sergey Kuzmin	KO	3 (10), 2:21	13 Nov 2015	Boxing & Gym Academy, Moscow, Russia	
23	Win	18–5	Marival Sobral Sobrinho	TKO	2 (8), 2:30	24 Sep 2015	Arena Projeto Viver, São Paulo, Brazil	
22	Loss	17–5	Dillian Whyte	TKO	1 (8), 2:41	1 Aug 2015	Craven Park, Hull, England	
21	Win	17–4	Adilson Nolli	KO	1 (8), 2:24	16 Jun 2015	Arena Projeto Viver, São Paulo, Brazil	
20	Loss	16–4	Denis Boytsov	RTD	2 (10), 3:00	21 Mar 2015	Rostock, Germany	
19	Loss	16–3	David Price	TKO	6 (10), 2:59	21 Feb 2015	O2 World, Berlin, Germany	
18	Win	16–2	Eduardo Franca	RTD	3 (8), 3:00	18 Jan 2015	Arena Projeto Viver, São Paulo, Brazil	
17	Loss	15–2	Joseph Parker	KO	4 (12), 0:31	6 Dec 2014	Claudelands Arena, Hamilton, New Zealand	For WBA-PABA and WBO Oriental heavyweight titles
16	Loss	15–1	Christian Hammer	UD	12	31 Oct 2014	Kugelbake-Halle, Cuxhaven, Germany	
15	Win	15–0	Daniel Alejandro Sanabria	UD	12	25 Jan 2014	Arena Santos, Santos, Brazil	Retained WBO Latino heavyweight title
14	Win	14–0	Héctor Alfredo Ávila	KO	1 (12)	8 Jun 2013	Cordeirópolis, Brazil	Won vacant WBO Latino heavyweight title
13	Win	13–0	Saennes Pereira	KO	2 (8), 2:43	13 Nov 2012	Ginasio Baby Barione, São Paulo, Brazil	
12	Win	12–0	Kleber Giovanne Souza Pereira	TKO	1 (8), 1:47	21 Aug 2012	Ginasio Baby Barione, São Paulo, Brazil	
11	Win	11–0	Juan Orlando Toloza	KO	1 (8), 1:22	29 Jun 2012	Sociedade Esportiva Palmeiras, São Paulo, Brazil	
10	Win	10–0	Matias Ariel Vidondo	RTD	7 (10), 3:00	11 Nov 2011	Club Sportivo America, Rosario, Argentina	
9	Win	9–0	Dartanhan Santos	TKO	1 (6), 1:23	20 Aug 2011	Pitangueiras, Brazil	
8	Win	8–0	Marcelo Furia	KO	2 (8), 1:08	2 Jul 2011	Ginasio Baby Barione, São Paulo, Brazil	
7	Win	7–0	Ruy da Gloria	TKO	1 (8), 1:31	2 Apr 2011	Ginasio Baby Barione, São Paulo, Brazil	
6	Win	6–0	Saul Farah	TKO	2 (8), 1:31	1 Mar 2011	Ginasio Baby Barione, São Paulo, Brazil	
5	Win	5–0	Thabiso Mogale	TKO	5 (8), 2:15	14 Dec 2010	Ginasio Baby Barione, São Paulo, Brazil	
4	Win	4–0	Carlos Barcelete	KO	2 (6), 1:10	18 Sep 2010	Escola Estadual Sao Fernandes, Ferraz de Vasconcelos, Brazil	
3	Win	3–0	Adilson Da Silva Santos	UD	4	30 Apr 2010	Prefeitura Municipal, Votorantim, Brazil	
2	Win	2–0	Eduardo Franca	KO	2 (4)	27 Mar 2010	Ibiúna, Brazil	
1	Win	1–0	Rodolfo Xavier Andreati	TKO	1 (4), 1:40	9 Mar 2010	Ginasio Baby Barione, São Paulo, Brazil	

== Bare knuckle record ==
Professional record breakdown
1 match	0 wins	1 loss
By knockout	0	1

Res.	Record	Opponent	Method	Event	Date	Round	Time	Location	Notes
Loss	0–1	Bobby Gunn	KO (punches)	BKFC 1	2 June 2018	1	0:41	Cheyenne, Wyoming, United States	

Sporting positions
Regional boxing titles
Vacant Title last held by Luis Ortiz	WBO Latino heavyweight champion 8 June 2013 – March 2015; Vacated	Vacant Title next held by Vicente Sandez
