= Anthony Joshua vs. Alexander Povetkin =

Boxing match

- Date: 22 September 2018
- Venue: Wembley Stadium, London, England
- Title(s) on the line: WBA (Super), IBF, WBO, and IBO heavyweight titles

Tale of the tape
Boxer	Anthony Joshua	Alexander Povetkin
Nickname	AJ	Sasha
Hometown	London, England	Kursk, Russia
Pre-fight record	21–0 (20 KOs)	34–1 (24 KOs)
Age	28 years, 11 months	39 years
Height	6 ft 6 in (198 cm)	6 ft 2 in (188 cm)
Weight	245 lb (111 kg)	222 lb (101 kg)
Style	Orthodox	Orthodox
Recognition	WBA (Super), IBF, WBO, and IBO; Heavyweight Champion; The Ring; No. 1 Ranked Heavyweight	WBA/WBO; No. 1 Ranked Heavyweight; IBF; No. 2 Ranked Heavyweight; The Ring; No. 3 Ranked Heavyweight

Result
- Joshua wins via 7th-round TKO

Anthony Joshua vs. Alexander Povetkin was a professional boxing match contested on 22 September 2018, for the unified WBA (Super), IBF, WBO, and IBO heavyweight championship. The bout took place at Wembley Stadium in London.

Joshua defeated Povetkin, retaining his heavyweight titles via seventh-round technical knockout (TKO).

== Background ==
Following Povetkin's twelve-round unanimous decision (UD) victory over Christian Hammer in December 2017, the WBA installed Povetkin as their mandatory challenger to Joshua's WBA (Super) title. Joshua defeated Joseph Parker in March 2018 by UD to capture the WBO title, with Povetkin appearing on the undercard, defeating David Price via fifth-round knockout (KO). The following month, the WBA ordered Joshua to enter into negotiations for a fight with Povetkin within 30 days.

During this time, Joshua's promoter, Eddie Hearn, was also attempting to negotiate an undisputed fight with WBC champion Deontay Wilder, offering him $15 million to face Joshua at Wembley which Wilder agreed to however co-manager Shelly Finkel refused to return the contact. After the WBA granted several extensions to their deadline in order to facilitate the negotiations with Wilder, they gave Joshua 24 hours on 26 June to provide a signed contract with Povetkin or risk being stripped of his WBA (Super) title. Hearn expressed his frustration with Finkel and Wilder's team saying "I immediately thought what a load of bulls---. I spoke to my dad. He said, 'They're playing games.' When Finkel said, 'We'll get it back to you on Friday -- six days later -- the WBA said enough's enough. Shelly knew the WBA was calling me every day. Tuesday, I spoke to Joshua and he said, 'We're not getting into any purse bids, losing any belts, we'll fight Povetkin and then Wilder.' ... If you have a so-called manager that received a contract and you want the fight so bad for $15 million and the undisputed title, and you don't read that within 24 hours and have it back within 48 hours, you're doing your fighter a disservice." Hearn also said that he had contacted Wilder directly to offered Wilder two options "I said I will give you $5 million to make a defense of your title in America in September or October on DAZN before entering the Joshua fight in April. Therefore, it was a two-fight deal for $20 million. But I told him you don't have to take two fights. You can do your own thing in the fall and then go right into the Joshua fight in April."

On 16 July, Joshua vs. Povetkin was officially announced to take place on 22 September at the Wembley Stadium in London. Povetkin's only previous loss was in his last world title shot against Wladimir Klitschko in October 2013.

== The fights ==
=== Undercard ===
The card opened with 2016 Olympic silver medalist Shakhram Giyasov (WBA:14th) stopping Julio Laguna in the 4th round.

=== Kuzmin vs. Okolie ===
This was followed by unbeaten Russian Sergey Kuzmin (WBC:20th) facing former British and Commonwealth heavyweight champion David Price.

==== The fight ====
Price retired hurt at the end of the fourth round citing a bicep tear. At the time of the stoppage, Price appeared to be winning the fight at the time of the fight being halted, although he also appeared tired. Kuzmin showed that he was able to take Price's best power shots to keep coming. Kuzmin kept coming forward and landing hard body shots.

Preceded by vs. Jeremiah Karpency	Sergey Kuzmin's bouts 22 September 2018	Succeeded by vs. LaRon Mitchell
Preceded by vs. Alexander Povetkin	David Price's bouts 22 September 2018	Succeeded by vs. Tom Little

=== Askin vs. Okolie ===
The 3rd bout of the night saw Matty Askin (WBC:15th) defend his British cruiserweight title against former Commonwealth champion Lawrence Okolie (WBA:15th WBC:29th).

==== The fight ====
In what was described as an 'ugly fight', Okolie lost a total of three points for fouls. During the middle rounds there was a lot of holding and wrestling. Okolie began using his head on the inside which resulted in him losing points. The bout lasted the full 12 rounds and Okolie was awarded a unanimous decision victory with scores of 116–110, 114–112 and 114–113.

Preceded by vs. Stephen Simmons	Matty Askin's bouts 22 September 2018	Retired
Preceded by vs. Luke Watkins	Lawrence Okolie's bouts 22 September 2018	Succeeded by vs. Tamas Lodi

=== Campbell vs. Mendy II ===
The chief support saw former world title challenger Luke Campbell (WBC:2nd) have a rematch with the first boxer to defeat him Yvan Mendy (WBC:1st) in a WBC lightweight final eliminator.

Since defeating Campbell in their first fight in December 2015, Mendy had gone on to win seven fights in a row. Promoter Hearn called the bout a "true 50–50 fight" as both boxers had improved since their first meeting.

==== The fight ====
Mendy had his moments in the earlier rounds, but once Campbell adjusted, he was able to box and move to outscore his opponent. Campbell won the bout by unanimous decision to avenge the earlier defeat with the scorecards reading 119–109, 118–111 and 116–112.

==== Aftermath ====
Campbell's victory made him the mandatory for WBC lightweight champion Mikey Garcia.

Preceded by vs. Troy James	Luke Campbell's bouts 22 September 2018	Succeeded by vs. Adrian Yung
Preceded by vs. Jesus Arevalo	Yvan Mendy's bouts 22 September 2018	Succeeded by vs. Achiko Odikadze

=== Main Event ===
After a tentative start to the opening round which saw neither fighter land significant punches, Povetkin landed a three-punch combination ending with a left hook in the final seconds of the round, momentarily stunning Joshua and leaving the champion with a broken and bloodied nose. The action picked up in the second, with Povetkin landing hooks to the head and body at close range while Joshua, opting to fight at a distance to utilise his height and reach advantage, landed jabs and straight-right hands to the head and body. Povetkin suffered a cut above his right eye towards the end of the round. Rounds three through six saw much of the same; Povetkin finding success up close with hooks and Joshua with jabs and straight right hands at range. Povetkin suffered a cut above his left eye in round four. Halfway through the seventh round, Joshua landed a right hand which visibly stunned Povetkin. After several follow up punches, Joshua landed a left-hook right-hand combination, knocking Povetkin to the canvas. Povetkin rose to his feet before the referee's count of ten, only to be met by a flurry of punches while against the ropes, prompting referee Steve Gray to wave off the fight, at 1 minute and 59 seconds into the round, after which Povetkin stumbled and fell to the canvas for a second time. At the time of the stoppage, all three judges' had Joshua ahead on the scorecards at 59–55, and 58–56 twice.

== Aftermath ==
Speaking after the bout Joshua praised Povetkin saying "Povetkin is a very tough challenger, he proved that with good left hooks and counter punches. I came in here to have fun, and give it my best. I knew he was strong to the head but weak to the body. I was just mixing it up. It could have been seven, maybe nine, maybe 12 rounds to get him out of there, but the ultimate aim was to be victorious and I got my knockout streak back." When asked about his next opponent once again called out WBC champion Deontay Wilder "My number one choice would be Wilder. All I want to fight is serious challengers. If Dillian wants to fight here he is also more than welcome." Less than 24 hours before the first bell Wilder had signed to challenge Lineal champion Tyson Fury who had ended a 2 1/2 years absence from the ring in June.

Joshua's performance was praised as perhaps his best so far with BBC Sport's boxing correspondent Mike Costello saying "It was a brilliantly placed and timed right hand. He was getting the measure of Povetkin in the early rounds. Unlike Carlos Takam and Parker - Joshua's last two opponents - Povetkin was here to win. I think the quality of opponent, for all Povetkin has done, for me, the way he was beaten makes it the most impressive display of Joshua's career."

== Fight card ==
Confirmed bouts:

Weight Class		vs.		Method	Round	Time	Notes
Heavyweight	Anthony Joshua (c)	def.	Alexander Povetkin	TKO	7/12	1:59	^{Note 1}
Lightweight	Luke Campbell	def.	Yvan Mendy	UD	12		^{Note 2}
Cruiserweight	Lawrence Okolie	def.	Matty Askin (c)	UD	12		^{Note 3}
Heavyweight	Sergey Kuzmin	def.	David Price	RTD	4/10	3:00	^{Note 4}
Welterweight	Shakhram Giyasov	def.	Julio Laguna	TKO	4/6	0:38
Unfought floater bouts
Welterweight	Chris Kongo	vs.	Petar Alexandrov	N/a	4
Light Heavyweight	Dana Zaxo	vs.	Tony Bilic	N/a	4

^Note 1 For WBA (Super), IBF, WBO, and IBO heavyweight titles
^Note 2 WBC lightweight final eliminator
^Note 3 For British cruiserweight title
^Note 4 For vacant WBA Inter-Continental heavyweight title

== Broadcasting ==
Country	Broadcaster
Australia	Main Event
Russia	Match TV
Ukraine	Inter
United Kingdom	Sky Sports
United States	DAZN

Preceded by vs. Joseph Parker	Anthony Joshua's bouts 22 September 2018	Succeeded by vs. Andy Ruiz Jr.
Preceded by vs. David Price	Alexander Povetkin's bouts 22 September 2018	Succeeded by vs. Hughie Fury
