= Danny Williams (boxer) =

British boxer (born 1973)

Personal information
- Nicknames: Brixton Bomber; Dynamite Dan; Brixton Hammer
- Born: Daniel Peter Williams; 13 July 1973 (age 53) Brixton, London, England
- Height: 6 ft 1 1/2 in (187 cm)
- Weight: Heavyweight

Boxing career
- Reach: 79 in (201 cm)
- Stance: Orthodox

Boxing record
- Total fights: 89
- Wins: 55
- Win by KO: 42
- Losses: 33
- No contests: 1
Medal record
Men's amateur boxing
Representing England
Commonwealth Games
Bronze medal – third place	1994 Victoria	Super-heavyweight
Multi Nations Championships
Gold medal – first place	1994 Liverpool	Super-heavyweight
European Championships
Bronze medal – third place	1993 Bursa	Heavyweight
Tammer Tournament
Bronze medal – third place	1992 Tampere	Heavyweight

Daniel Peter Williams (born 13 July 1973) is a British former professional boxer who competed from 1995 to 2023. He challenged once for the WBC and the Ring magazine heavyweight titles in 2004. At regional level, he held the Commonwealth heavyweight title twice between 1999 and 2006, the British heavyweight title twice between 2000 and 2010, and challenged once for the European heavyweight title in 2003. As an amateur, he won bronze medals at the 1993 European Championships and 1994 Commonwealth Games. Williams is best known for scoring an upset knockout victory against Mike Tyson in 2004.

== Early life ==
Williams's parents are both originally from Jamaica. Williams grew up in Brixton, South London with his 2 older brothers and 1 younger sister.

== Amateur career ==
As an amateur boxer out of the famous Lynn AC boxing gym in SE London, Williams learned his trade quickly, often sparring with the likes of clubmates Henry Akinwande and Derek Angol. In 1991 Williams won the PLA tournament and won a gold medal in Sardinia multi-nation tournament and a gold medal in the Greek multi-nations tournament. In the Finland multi-nations in 1992 he won a bronze medal.

Williams also won a bronze medal at the European Championships 1993 at heavyweight in the 91 kg/201 lbs limit and bronze at super heavyweight at the 1994 Commonwealth Games. Williams also won a gold medal at the 1994 Liverpool multi-nations tournament. His amateur record was 29–6.

=== Highlights ===
(bronze) Tammer tournament, Tampere, Finland, October 1992:

- 1/4: Defeated Girdrius Monstvilas (Lithuania) RSC 1
- 1/2: Lost to Vasiliy Kirianov (Finland) 22:28

(bronze) European championships, Bursa, Turkey, September 1993:

- 1/8: Defeated Edin Bajrić (Bosnia and Herzegovina) AB 2
- 1/4: Defeated Dmitriy Karpeyev (Ukraine) RSC 3
- 1/2: Lost to Don Diego Poeder (Netherlands) KO 1

(gold) Multi-nations tournament, Liverpool, England, May 1994:

- 1/2: Defeated Shane Hinton (Canada) RSC 2
- Finals: Defeated Danny Watts (England) KO 1

(bronze) Commonwealth Games, Victoria, Canada, August 1994:

- 1/4: Defeated Shane Hinton (Canada) 19:9
- 1/2: Lost to Duncan Dokiwari (Nigeria) 13:24

== Professional career ==
=== Early career ===
Williams turned pro in 1995 knocking out Vance Ideans in two rounds. He fought routinely on Frank Warren undercards and compiled a 15–0 (12 KOs) record. He is currently managed by London promoter Michael Helliet and is trained by Jim McDonagh.

=== British and Commonwealth title challenge ===
==== Williams vs. Francis ====
Williams took his first big step up in April 1999 to challenge Julius Francis for his British and Commonwealth heavyweight titles. A hot favourite, Williams lost in a points decision to the 34-year-old veteran.

=== First reign as British and Commonwealth champion ===
==== Williams vs. Senior ====
Francis would later vacate the Commonwealth title for a big money fight with Mike Tyson. Williams won the title with a closely contested split decision over respected British contender (and former amateur clubmate) Harry Senior.

==== Williams vs. Potter ====
In 2000 Williams put together four knockouts before fighting Mark Potter for the Commonwealth title and the vacant British title. In an extremely dramatic fight, Williams suffered a dislocated right arm, yet very bravely fought on with one arm over two rounds before knocking Potter out with a left uppercut.

==== Williams vs. Meehan ====
After an eight-month layoff for surgery and recovery, Williams returned to knock out a respected opponent – Kali Meehan in 32 seconds.

==== Williams vs. Francis II ====
Williams then avenged his defeat to Francis, stopping him on an eye injury in the 4th round. Afterwards he was signed by Don King and ended 2001 knocking out US journeyman Shaun Robinson in two rounds on an undercard in America.

==== Williams vs. Sprott ====
Williams' tenure under King would prove to be uneventful, and he did not renew his contract at the end of 2002, a year that saw Williams retain his British and Commonwealth titles with a knockout of late sub Michael Sprott.

==== Williams vs. Long ====
Williams then scored a points win over Keith Long. As this was Williams' third defence of the British title, he won the Lonsdale belt outright, before dropping out of a fight in America with hard hitting South African southpaw Corrie Sanders, because it coincided with Ramadan.

=== European title challenge ===
==== Williams vs. Samil Sam ====
In February 2003 Williams travelled to Germany to fight the Turk Sinan Samil Sam for his European heavyweight title. A strong favourite, Williams was surprisingly dropped three times and stopped in six rounds. In the UK, his local rivals Audley Harrison and Herbie Hide derided him in the press.

=== Resumed reign as British and Commonwealth champion ===
==== Williams vs. Mirovic ====
Williams returned with a fourth round stoppage of Australian Bob Mirovic to retain his Commonwealth title.

==== Williams vs. Sprott II ====
Williams then knocked out Michael Sprott in five rounds to defend his British & Commonwealth titles. The ending was controversial due to alleged low blows before the final shot.

==== Williams vs. Sprott III ====
To begin 2004, Williams re-signed with Frank Warren then lost his British and Commonwealth in a third meeting with Michael Sprott via a disputed close points decision.

=== Rise up the ranks ===
==== Williams vs. Tyson ====
After two comeback knockout wins, Williams boxed former world champion Mike Tyson at Freedom Hall, Louisville, Kentucky in July 2004. After staggering Williams numerous times in the first round, Tyson was unable to seriously hurt Williams in subsequent rounds and could not cope with Williams' sustained aggression and accurate combination punching. Williams knocked Tyson down with a series of punches in the fourth round for a knockout win.

=== WBC and The Ring heavyweight title challenge ===
==== Williams vs. Klitschko ====
In December he finally challenged for a world heavyweight title, but Vitali Klitschko proved too much, as Williams was stopped in the 8th round after going down four times.

=== Second reign as Commonwealth champion ===
==== Williams vs. Harrison ====
In December, Williams regained his old Commonwealth belt by beating undefeated Olympic gold medallist Audley Harrison by split decision.

==== Williams vs. Skelton ====
Williams retained the Commonwealth title with a controversial points win over undefeated Matt Skelton in March 2006.

==== Williams vs. Skelton II ====
After beating Adnan Serin by a third round retirement, Williams lost his Commonwealth title by unanimous decision in a rematch with Skelton.

In December 2006 when Skelton dropped out of a fight with Audley Harrison, Williams stepped in at a weeks notice. By his own admission he had been training for eight weeks for a fight with British champion Scott Gammer. Williams lost by TKO in the 3rd round, suffering a broken nose.

=== Second reign as British champion ===
==== Williams vs. Gammer ====
In March 2007 Williams regained the British title in Wales with a 9th-round knockout of Scott Gammer. Williams came in at the lightest he had been since his pro debut 16 stone 4 pounds (4 stones lighter than his previous fight), after training himself for the fight just with a piece of paper that contained a conditioning programme given to him by Joe Dunbar who had worked with Lennox Lewis.

==== Williams vs. Platov ====
After he had watched the tape of his fight with Gammer, Williams decided he would continue boxing and took a fight with Ukrainian prospect Oleg Platov (26–1, 22 KOs). He came in again at 270 lbs. Both fighters were engaged in wild exchanges from the first bell on. The Ukrainian picked up a badly-bleeding cut above the left eye following an accidental headbutt in the second round and he continued to swing wild punches but not without taking some huge shots from Williams. After 2:15 in the fourth and with the cut getting worse, the referee waved the fight off. According to the rules of the IBF, it was declared a no contest. Sauerland managing director Chris Meyer defended the decision. "The rules are clear", he said. "We had an accidental headbutt and the referee, who consulted the doctor several times, ruled he could not continue to protect his health." Speaking exclusively to SecondsOut after the fight a disappointed Williams said: "He (Platov) was looking for a way out and he got it. He knew the rules and worked them. He was starting to tire and knew it was only a matter of time before I knocked him out. ...I found it slow in the early rounds but I when I got going I started to get on top. He knew I was gonna knock him out and he was looking for a way out. I’m not sure whether or not it was a punch or a head clash that cut him in the second round. It took be a little while to get going but I really enjoyed it, it was a great fight while it lasted. But he was looking for a way out. He kept falling to the floor and it was only a matter of time before I knocked him out."

==== Williams vs. Airich ====
On 30 May 2008 Williams defeated unbeaten German, Konstantin Airich in a highly controversial fight. Williams had a total of 3 points deducted in rounds 2 and 5 creating a feeling afterwards that the referee was blatantly on the side of the German. In addition he was given 2 standing 8 counts by the referee in round 3 despite not actually being knocked down or touching the canvas, and was also counted after slipping in round 4. After managing to fight back and score a knockdown himself in round 5, in the 6th round Williams unleashed a series of extremely punishing blows on his opponent sending him reeling across the ring. At this point Airich's promoter Ahmet Oner controversially ran over and rang the timekeeper's bell himself to end the round and save his fighter, even though there was still 1:28 left to go in the round. Despite this confusion the fight continued after the shortened 6th round and after seeing his man absorb more heavy punishment in the next round Oner eventually threw in the towel handing Williams a 7th-round TKO victory.

In the aftermath of the fight Williams was extremely critical of the performance of both the referee and fight promoters, and called for the British Boxing Board of Control to conduct an immediate investigation into the fight.

==== Williams vs. McDermott ====
Williams faced John McDermott at Goresbrook Leisure Centre, Dagenham on 18 July 2008. Despite being deducted three points in rounds eleven and twelve, he defeated McDermott in a majority points decision.

==== Williams vs. Sosnowski ====
He was due to face John McDermott in a rematch at York Hall on 8 November 2008, but McDermott withdrew due to a rib injury. Williams also faced a bout with Francois Botha on 30 November 2008 in Egypt. Polish fighter Albert Sosnowski was called in as a late replacement for McDermott.

==== Williams vs. McDermott II ====
Williams suffered a shock defeat by 8th-round TKO and as a result the Botha fight was called off. The McDermott rematch was finally arranged for 2 May 2009 in a defence of the British Heavyweight Championship belt that Williams held. Williams won the match in a points victory over McDermott.

=== Prizefighter ===
Williams took part in the Prizefighter tournament on 2 October 2009. In the run up to the tournament Williams said he would knock out Audley Harrison and show himself as the best British heavyweight. In his first bout on the night, Carl Baker from Sheffield beat Williams on points after knocking him down twice in the opening round.

=== Resumed reign as British champion ===
==== Williams vs. Chisora ====
Williams defended his British title for a third and final time against Derek Chisora on 15 May 2010. Williams lost by KO in round two. Before the fight he promised this would be his last fight, win or lose, but he has yet to announce his retirement. The fight was originally due to take place against Sam Sexton in February but was put back to May after Sexton injured his hand. Sexton withdrew from the fight again after his mother suffered a brain aneurysm and Chisora stepped in as a replacement.

=== Comebacks ===
==== Williams vs. Charr ====
Williams returned to boxing after nearly a year of inactivity with a 2nd-round TKO victory over German Frank Kary Roth in Bielefeld on 5 March 2011. Williams was now being licensed to fight by the Baltic League of Professional Boxing, with the British Boxing Board of Control stating they had concerns about Williams's decline in ability to box. On 9 April, he scored his second KO win since his comeback. He won a 1-round KO against Hungarian Laszlo Toth. On 25 June Williams suffered a TKO defeat against Mahmoud Charr. The fight was controversially stopped in round 7 after a barrage from Williams was returned by a short flurry from Charr. It appeared that the referee stopped the fight in Charr's favour as soon as it looked like he may be in trouble.

Williams then won a SD against Alfred Cole on 3 September, in Sweden, Cole returning after two years away from the sport.

A fight with unbeaten Alexander Ustinov was set to take place in October 2011, but Williams withdrew due to a viral infection. Williams fought the Norwegian heavyweight boxer Leif Olve Dolonen Larsen in Pabellon Municipal, Silla, Valencia, Comunidad Valenciana, Spain on Friday 2 December 2011. Williams was dropped several times by the former NFL footballer and the fight was stopped in the second round. Williams announced his retirement once again shortly afterwards, but a return to boxing was scheduled against 0–3 middleweight Marvin Meyer, leading to various hoax articles claiming that Williams was moving down to middleweight. This fight never happened, and neither did a rematch with Zoltan Petranyi for the Universal Boxing Organisation (UBO) European title, which was called off on the day of the fight after Williams was cut when he fell over in the shower. The two fighters entered the ring on fight night to apologise to the crowd for the incident. A second rescheduling of the fight, which had already been postponed from 2011 due to "personal problems" for Williams, was promised but has yet to be scheduled.

Williams had two unsuccessful title challenges in September 2012, being outpointed in Finland by Janne Katajisto for the obscure Baltic Boxing Union belt and then being stopped in the 4th round against Christian Hammer in a WBO European heavyweight title fight. Williams refused to take a drugs test after the fight, claiming there was no point as he was going to retire, and that he was shot.

Just days after announcing yet another retirement, Williams called out Mark Potter for a rematch of their famous clash in 2000 when Williams knocked out Potter despite having a dislocated shoulder. Potter responded saying he was very keen on the fight. The fight is likely to be unlicensed as Potter's BBBofC license was taken away after suffering a detached retina, while the BBBofC have already announced their reservations against licensing Williams. Williams later claimed he had been told to call out Potter on camera, and that he was not being serious.

Once again, Williams's retirement proved to be short-lived as he fought Denis Bakhtov in Podolsk, Russia on 8 December 2012, losing by unanimous decision over 10 rounds. He fought again just 13 days later losing in a points decision against Werner Kreiskott over 8 rounds. In March 2013 he was stopped in round 2 by cruiserweight Mairis Briedis in Riga, Latvia. This fight was unsanctioned as it was an exhibition. Danny fought Kelvin Price on 18 May 2013 losing a controversial decision in Russia. He then went on to fight notorious English hard man Dominic Negus in an unlicensed fight in London, England as a farewell to his fans, stopping Negus in the 4th round.

Williams claimed the lightly-regarded Global Boxing Federation (GBF) World Heavyweight title on 28 April 2018 in Hungary when he defeated Czech journeyman Martin Stensky.

In July 2018 in Aberdeen, Williams lost a WBU heavyweight title fight on an event sanctioned by the British & Irish Boxing Authority against former lightweight Lee McAllister. This fight was not recognised by BoxRec. Williams once again announced his retirement after this fight.

== Personal life ==
Williams is a devout Muslim and was first drawn to Islam while abroad, "I went to Turkey and heard the Adhan" he explained. "I was a Christian at the time and I got goosebumps and carried on looking into Islam and I just felt this was the way of life for me and this was the way of life for God."

Williams has 2 daughters, Nubiah (born 1999) and Maliha (born 2004).

== Professional boxing record ==
89 fights	55 wins	33 losses
By knockout	42	17
By decision	13	16
No contests	1	

No.	Result	Record	Opponent	Type	Round, time	Date	Location	Notes
89	Loss	55–33 (1)	Louison Loizou	UD	4	26 Aug 2023	Tondi 17 Boxing Hall, Tallinn, Estonia	
88	Win	55–32 (1)	Vadims Tihomirovs	KO	1 (6), 2:39	22 Apr 2023	Tondi 17 Boxing Hall, Tallinn, Estonia	
87	Loss	54–32 (1)	Nelson Hysa	UD	6	13 Nov 2022	Ramazan Njala Sports Palace, Durrës, Albania	
86	Loss	54–31 (1)	Djuar El Scheich	TKO	3 (6), 1:46	27 Mar 2022	Panther Gym, Cologne, Germany	
85	Loss	54–30 (1)	Serdar Avcı	UD	4	8 Dec 2021	Pochayna Event Hall, Kyiv, Ukraine	
84	Loss	54–29 (1)	Sergei Kharitonov	TKO	2 (6), 2:25	11 Sep 2020	Basketball Center, Khimki, Russia	
83	Win	54–28 (1)	Mehmed Crnalic	TKO	1 (6), 1:35	30 Nov 2019	Challenge Club Arena, Offenbach, Germany	
82	Loss	53–28 (1)	Kristaps Zutis	KO	1 (6), 0:23	21 Sep 2019	Arena Riga, Riga, Latvia	
81	Loss	53–27 (1)	Ruslan Myrsatayev	KO	4 (10), 0:51	5 Jul 2019	Baluan Sholak Sports Palace, Almaty	
80	Win	53–26 (1)	Boban Filipovic	TKO	3 (6), 1:43	23 Feb 2019	Volkshaus, Weiz, Austria	
79	Win	52–26 (1)	Jozsef Kormany	TKO	1 (6), 2:42	11 May 2018	Csigahaz Muvelodesi Kozpont, Kistarcsa, Hungary	
78	Win	51–26 (1)	Martin Stensky	KO	1 (12), 1:17	28 Apr 2018	Szechenyi Sport Hall, Szolnok, Hungary	Won vacant GBF heavyweight title
77	Win	50–26 (1)	Rudolf Balaz	TKO	1 (4), 2:09	11 Mar 2018	DK Peklo, Plzeň, Czech Republic	
76	Win	49–26 (1)	Pavel Šiška	UD	4	28 Jul 2017	Hospůdka Eden, Ústí nad Labem, Czech Republic	
75	Loss	48–26 (1)	Andreas Sidon	TKO	5 (6), 2:20	12 Nov 2016	Autohaus Dürkop, Kassel, Germany	
74	Win	48–25 (1)	Pavel Šiška	PTS	4	26 Jun 2015	Hotel Bobycentrum, Brno, Czech Republic	
73	Win	47–25 (1)	Radek Varak	TKO	3 (4), 1:20	11 Apr 2015	Sluneta, Ústí nad Labem, Czech Republic	
72	Loss	46–25 (1)	Zsolt Bogdan	UD	10	29 Dec 2014	The Aquincum Hotel, Budapest, Hungary	For vacant GBF heavyweight title
71	Loss	46–24 (1)	Adrian Granat	TKO	2 (6), 0:48	31 Oct 2014	Kugelbake-Halle, Cuxhaven, Germany	
70	Loss	46–23 (1)	Pavel Doroshilov	UD	4	9 Aug 2014	Open Air Bike Show, Sevastopol	
69	Loss	46–22 (1)	Frantisek Kynkal	UD	4	31 May 2014	Hospůdka Eden, Ústí nad Labem, Czech Republic	
68	Win	46–21 (1)	Martin Stensky	TKO	1 (4), 1:27	24 May 2014	Bistro u Trumpetky, Louny, Czech Republic	
67	Loss	45–21 (1)	Andrzej Wawrzyk	TKO	1 (8), 2:01	1 Feb 2014	Hala Okrąglak, Opole, Poland	
66	Loss	45–20 (1)	Tomáš Mrázek	SD	6	30 Dec 2013	Lucerna Music Bar, Prague, Czech Republic	
65	Win	45–19 (1)	Mazur Ali	TKO	6 (10)	19 Dec 2013	Yas Island du Forum, Abu Dhabi, UAE	
64	Loss	44–19 (1)	Oleg Maskaev	UD	10	4 Nov 2013	Basket-Hall, Krasnodar, Russia	
63	Loss	44–18 (1)	Marcin Rekowski	TKO	4 (8), 1:47	23 Aug 2013	Galați Skating Rink, Galați, Romania	
62	Loss	44–17 (1)	Kelvin Price	UD	10	18 May 2013	Yunost, Podolsk, Russia	For vacant Latvia heavyweight title
61	Loss	44–16 (1)	Mairis Briedis	TKO	2 (6), 1:09	23 Mar 2013	Arena Riga, Riga, Latvia	
60	Loss	44–15 (1)	Werner Kreiskott	UD	8	21 Dec 2012	Maritim Hotel, Cologne, Germany	
59	Loss	44–14 (1)	Denis Bakhtov	UD	10	8 Dec 2012	Sports Service, Podolsk, Russia	For vacant Latvia heavyweight title
58	Loss	44–13 (1)	Christian Hammer	TKO	4 (12), 0:57	28 Sep 2012	Sparkassen-Arena, Göttingen, Germany	For vacant WBO European heavyweight title
57	Loss	44–12 (1)	Janne Katajisto	UD	8	8 Sep 2012	Night Club HulluPullo, Vaasa, Finland	
56	Loss	44–11 (1)	Leif Larsen	TKO	2 (8)	2 Dec 2011	Pabellon Municipal, Silla, Spain	
55	Win	44–10 (1)	Al Cole	SD	6	3 Sep 2011	Karlstad CCC, Karlstad, Sweden	
54	Loss	43–10 (1)	Mahmoud Charr	TKO	7 (10), 1:16	25 Jun 2011	Lanxess Arena, Cologne, Germany	
53	Win	43–9 (1)	Laszlo Toth	KO	1 (10), 1:43	9 Apr 2011	Hotel Class, Hamburg, Germany	
52	Win	42–9 (1)	Frank Kary Roth	TKO	2 (6), 1:25	5 Mar 2011	Sportpalast, Bielefeld, Germany	
51	Loss	41–9 (1)	Derek Chisora	TKO	2 (12), 1:41	15 May 2010	Boleyn Ground, London, England	Lost British heavyweight title
50	Loss	41–8 (1)	Carl Baker	UD	3	2 Oct 2009	ExCeL, London, England	Prizefighter 8: heavyweight quarter-final
49	Win	41–7 (1)	John McDermott	SD	12	2 May 2009	Crowtree Leisure Centre, Sunderland, England	Retained British heavyweight title
48	Loss	40–7 (1)	Albert Sosnowski	TKO	8 (10), 1:17	8 Nov 2008	York Hall, London, England	
47	Win	40–6 (1)	John McDermott	MD	12	18 Jul 2008	Goresbrook Leisure Centre, London, England	Retained British heavyweight title
46	Win	39–6 (1)	Konstantin Airich	TKO	7 (8)	30 May 2008	Pabellon Lasesarre, Barakaldo, Spain	
45	Win	38–6 (1)	Marcus McGee	UD	6	12 Apr 2008	St. Pete Times Forum, Tampa, Florida, US	
44	NC	37–6 (1)	Oleg Platov	NC	4 (12), 2:15	8 Dec 2007	St. Jakobshalle, Basel, Switzerland	IBF Inter-Continental heavyweight title at stake; NC after Platov was cut from an accidental head clash
43	Win	37–6	Scott Gammer	KO	9 (12), 1:58	2 Mar 2007	Sports Centre, Neath, Wales	Won British heavyweight title
42	Loss	36–6	Audley Harrison	TKO	3 (12), 2:32	9 Dec 2006	ExCeL, London, England	
41	Loss	36–5	Matt Skelton	UD	12	8 Jul 2006	Millennium Stadium, Cardiff, Wales	Lost Commonwealth heavyweight title
40	Win	36–4	Adnan Serin	RTD	3 (10)	20 May 2006	King's Hall, Belfast, Northern Ireland	
39	Win	35–4	Matt Skelton	SD	12	25 Feb 2006	ExCeL, London, England	Retained Commonwealth heavyweight title
38	Win	34–4	Audley Harrison	SD	12	10 Dec 2005	ExCeL, London, England	Won vacant Commonwealth heavyweight title
37	Win	33–4	Zoltan Petranyi	TKO	3 (8), 1:24	4 Jun 2005	MEN Arena, Manchester, England	
36	Loss	32–4	Vitali Klitschko	TKO	8 (12), 1:26	11 Dec 2004	Mandalay Bay Events Center, Paradise, Nevada, US	For WBC and The Ring heavyweight titles
35	Win	32–3	Mike Tyson	KO	4 (10), 2:51	30 Jul 2004	Freedom Hall State Fairgrounds, Louisville, Kentucky, US	
34	Win	31–3	Augin N'Gou	TKO	3 (12)	13 May 2004	York Hall, London, England	Won vacant WBU International heavyweight title
33	Win	30–3	Ratko Draskovic	TKO	1 (8), 2:16	1 Apr 2004	York Hall, London, England	
32	Loss	29–3	Michael Sprott	PTS	12	24 Jan 2004	Wembley Conference Centre, London, England	Lost British and Commonwealth heavyweight titles
31	Win	29–2	Michael Sprott	TKO	5 (12), 0:19	26 Sep 2003	Rivermead Leisure Centre, Reading, England	Retained British and Commonwealth heavyweight titles
30	Win	28–2	Bob Mirovic	TKO	4 (12), 2:33	26 Apr 2003	Brentford Fountain Leisure Centre, London, England	Retained Commonwealth heavyweight title
29	Loss	27–2	Sinan Şamil Sam	TKO	6 (12), 2:56	8 Feb 2003	Estrel Hotel, Berlin, Germany	For European heavyweight title
28	Win	27–1	Keith Long	PTS	12	17 Sep 2002	York Hall, London, England	Retained British and Commonwealth heavyweight titles
27	Win	26–1	Michael Sprott	RTD	7 (12), 0:26	12 Feb 2002	York Hall, London, England	Retained British and Commonwealth heavyweight titles
26	Win	25–1	Shawn Robinson	TKO	2 (8), 2:21	15 Dec 2001	Foxwoods Resort Casino, Ledyard, Connecticut, US	
25	Win	24–1	Julius Francis	TKO	4 (12), 2:15	28 Jul 2001	Wembley Conference Centre, London, England	Retained British and Commonwealth heavyweight titles
24	Win	23–1	Kali Meehan	TKO	1 (12), 0:32	9 Jun 2001	York Hall, London, England	Retained Commonwealth heavyweight title
23	Win	22–1	Mark Potter	TKO	6 (12), 2:41	21 Oct 2000	Wembley Conference Centre, London, England	Retained Commonwealth heavyweight title; Won vacant British heavyweight title
22	Win	21–1	Quinn Navarre	TKO	6 (8)	23 Sep 2000	York Hall, London, England	
21	Win	20–1	Craig Bowen-Price	KO	1 (8), 2:13	24 Jun 2000	Hampden Park, Glasgow, Scotland	
20	Win	19–1	Michael Murray	KO	6 (10)	6 May 2000	Ballsporthalle, Frankfurt, Germany	
19	Win	18–1	Anton Nel	KO	5 (8), 2:29	19 Feb 2000	Goresbrook Leisure Centre, London, England	
18	Win	17–1	Harry Senior	PTS	12	18 Dec 1999	Elephant and Castle Shopping Centre, London, England	Won vacant Commonwealth heavyweight title
17	Win	16–1	Ferenc Deak	KO	1 (8)	2 Oct 1999	Namur, Belgium	
16	Loss	15–1	Julius Francis	PTS	12	3 Apr 1999	Royal Albert Hall, London, England	For British and Commonwealth heavyweight titles
15	Win	15–0	Antoine Palatis	UD	12	10 Oct 1998	York Hall, London, England	Won vacant WBO Inter-Continental heavyweight title
14	Win	14–0	Juan Antonio Diaz	KO	3 (8), 2:10	16 May 1998	York Hall, London, England	
13	Win	13–0	Shane Woollas	TKO	2 (8), 1:43	21 Feb 1998	Waterfront Hall, Belfast, Northern Ireland	
12	Win	12–0	Derek Amos	TKO	4 (8)	19 Dec 1997	Madison Square Garden, New York City, New York, US	
11	Win	11–0	Bruce Douglas	TKO	2 (8), 2:19	15 Nov 1997	Whitchurch Leisure Centre, Bristol, England	
10	Win	10–0	Roger McKenzie	TKO	2 (8), 0:38	19 Jul 1997	Wembley Arena, London, England	
9	Win	9–0	Albert Call	TKO	4 (4), 1:18	3 May 1997	NYNEX Arena, Manchester, England	
8	Win	8–0	Shane Woollas	TKO	2 (4), 2:11	8 Feb 1997	London Arena, London, England	
7	Win	7–0	Michael Murray	TKO	1 (4)	9 Nov 1996	NYNEX Arena, Manchester, England	
6	Win	6–0	Andy Lambert	TKO	2 (4)	31 Aug 1996	Point Theatre, Dublin, Ireland	
5	Win	5–0	John Pierre	PTS	4	13 Jul 1996	York Hall, London, England	
4	Win	4–0	James Wilder	PTS	4	9 Mar 1996	Green Glens Arena, Millstreet, Ireland	
3	Win	3–0	Alvin Miller	TKO	1 (6), 2:58	13 Feb 1996	York Hall, London, England	
2	Win	2–0	Joey Paladino	TKO	1 (6)	9 Dec 1995	York Hall, London, England	
1	Win	1–0	Vance Idiens	KO	2 (6)	21 Oct 1995	York Hall, London, England	

== Viewership ==
=== Russia ===
Date	Fight	Billing	Viewership (est.)	Network	Source(s)
11 December 2004	Vitali Klitschko vs. Danny Williams	Klitschko vs. Williams: KO in NY	17,500,000	1 Kanal	
	Total viewership		17,000,000	1 Kanal	

=== Pay-per-view bouts ===
Date	Fight	Billing	Buys	Network
30 July 2004	Tyson vs. Williams	Return for Revenge	150,000	Showtime
11 December 2004	Klitschko vs. Williams	Klitschko vs. Williams: KO in NY	120,000	HBO
	Total		270,000	

Sporting positions
Regional boxing titles
Vacant Title last held by Vitali Klitschko	WBO Inter-Continental heavyweight champion 10 October 1998 – April 1999; Vacated	Vacant Title next held by Julius Francis
Vacant Title last held by Julius Francis	Commonwealth heavyweight champion 18 December 1999 – 24 January 2004	Succeeded by Michael Sprott
Vacant Title last held by Michael Holden	British heavyweight champion 21 October 2000 – 24 January 2004	Succeeded by Michael Sprott
Vacant Title last held by Matt Skelton	Commonwealth heavyweight champion 10 December 2005 – 8 July 2006	Succeeded by Matt Skelton
Preceded by Scott Gammer	British heavyweight champion 2 March 2007 – 15 May 2010	Succeeded by Derek Chisora
Minor world boxing titles
Vacant Title last held by Zsolt Bogdan	GBF heavyweight champion 28 April 2018 – July 2019; Vacated	Vacant Title next held by Senad Gashi
