= John McDermott (heavyweight boxer) =

English boxer (born 1980)

Personal information
- Nickname: Big Bad John
- Born: John McDermott; 26 February 1980 (age 46) Basildon, Essex, England
- Height: 6 ft 3 in (191 cm)
- Weight: Heavyweight

Boxing career
- Reach: 76 in (193 cm)
- Stance: Orthodox

Boxing record
- Total fights: 36
- Wins: 28
- Win by KO: 18
- Losses: 8
Medal record
Men's amateur boxing
English National Championships
| Gold medal – first place | 2000 Barnsley | Super-heavyweight |

John McDermott (born 26 February 1980) is an English former professional boxer who competed from 2000 to 2013. At regional level, he challenged three times for the British heavyweight title in 2005, 2008 and 2009.

== Professional career ==
On 18 April 2008, McDermott won the vacant BBBofC English heavyweight title, knocking out Pele Reid in the second round. He had fought for the same title in 2004 losing on that occasion to Mark Krence.

In September 2007, he had also become the mandatory challenger for a second shot at the British title after beating Scott Gammer on points over 10 rounds. He had fought for the title once before in December 2005 losing in the 1st round to Matt Skelton.

McDermott faced Danny Williams at Goresbrook Leisure Centre, Dagenham on 18 July 2008 for the British Title, but was defeated controversially by a majority points decision. He was defeated again in the rematch on 2 May 2009, via a split points decision.

McDermott lost his English heavyweight title to future world heavyweight champion Tyson Fury in another controversial decision on 11 September. Referee Terry O'Connor, scored the fight 98–92 in favour of Fury. After the referee handed the decision to Fury, Sky Sports commentator Jim Watt asked; "Has he [O'Connor] got the names mixed up?" Jim Watt along with other commentators Glenn McCrory, Johnny Nelson all scored the fight to McDermott, as did David Haye. Fury defeated McDermott in a rematch on 25 June 2010. McDermott won a unanimous points decision against Matt Skelton on 16 March 2013 to regain the English Heavyweight title. He never defended this belt and the vacant title was eventually contested in June 2018, when Daniel Dubois stopped Tom Little.

== Professional boxing record ==
| 36 fights | 28 wins | 8 losses |
|---|---|---|
| By knockout | 18 | 4 |
| By decision | 10 | 4 |
| Draws | 0 | |

| No. | Result | Record | Opponent | Type | Round, time | Date | Location | Notes |
|---|---|---|---|---|---|---|---|---|
| 36 | Win | 28–8 | Matt Skelton | UD | 10 | 15 Mar 2013 | York Hall, London, England | Won vacant English heavyweight title |
| 35 | Win | 27–8 | Pavels Dolgovs | TKO | 4 (6), 1:46 | 24 Feb 2012 | Camden Centre, London, England | |
| 34 | Loss | 26–8 | David Price | KO | 1 (12), 1:13 | 21 Jan 2012 | Liverpool Olympia, Liverpool, England | For vacant English heavyweight title |
| 33 | Win | 26–7 | Larry Olubamiwo | TKO | 1 (10), 1:15 | 19 Feb 2011 | York Hall, London, England | Won vacant Southern Area heavyweight title |
| 32 | Loss | 25–7 | Tyson Fury | TKO | 9 (12), 1:08 | 25 Jun 2010 | Brentwood Centre, Brentwood, Essex, England | For vacant English heavyweight title |
| 31 | Loss | 25–6 | Tyson Fury | PTS | 10 | 11 Sep 2009 | Brentwood Centre, Brentwood, Essex, England | Lost English heavyweight title |
| 30 | Loss | 25–5 | Danny Williams | SD | 12 | 2 May 2009 | Crowtree Leisure Centre, Sunderland, England | For British heavyweight title |
| 29 | Loss | 25–4 | Danny Williams | MD | 12 | 18 Jul 2008 | Goresbrook Leisure Centre, London, England | For British heavyweight title |
| 28 | Win | 25–3 | Pelé Reid | TKO | 2 (10), 1:45 | 18 Apr 2008 | York Hall, London, England | Won vacant English heavyweight title |
| 27 | Win | 24–3 | Daniil Peretyatko | PTS | 6 | 1 Feb 2008 | York Hall, London, England | |
| 26 | Win | 23–3 | Scott Gammer | PTS | 10 | 29 Sep 2007 | Sheffield Arena, Sheffield, England | |
| 25 | Win | 22–3 | Luke Simpkin | TKO | 2 (6), 2:28 | 15 Jun 2007 | National Sports Centre, London, England | |
| 24 | Win | 21–3 | Paul King | PTS | 6 | 2 Mar 2007 | Neath Sports Centre, Neath, Wales | |
| 23 | Win | 20–3 | Vitali Shkraba | TKO | 1 (6), 2:24 | 26 Jan 2007 | Goresbrook Leisure Centre, London, England | |
| 22 | Loss | 19–3 | Matt Skelton | TKO | 1 (12), 1:19 | 10 Dec 2005 | ExCeL London, London, England | For British heavyweight title |
| 21 | Win | 19–2 | Alvin Miller | KO | 1 (6), 2:33 | 8 Apr 2005 | Meadowbank Stadium, Edinburgh, Scotland | |
| 20 | Loss | 18–2 | Mark Krence | PTS | 10 | 11 Dec 2004 | ExCeL London, London, England | For English heavyweight title |
| 19 | Win | 18–1 | Suren Kalachyan | TKO | 7 (8) | 30 Jul 2004 | York Hall, London, England | |
| 18 | Win | 17–1 | James Zikic | RTD | 4 (6), 3:00 | 13 May 2004 | York Hall, London, England | |
| 17 | Loss | 16–1 | Nikolay Popov | TKO | 2 (8) | 18 Sep 2003 | Goresbrook Leisure Centre, London, England | |
| 16 | Win | 16–0 | Kostyantyn Pryziuk | PTS | 8 | 8 May 2003 | Kingsway Leisure Centre, Cheshire, England | |
| 15 | Win | 15–0 | Derek McCafferty | PTS | 4 | 15 Feb 2003 | Conference Centre, London, England | |
| 14 | Win | 14–0 | Jason Brewster | TKO | 1 (8), 0:54 | 14 Dec 2002 | Telewest Arena, Newcastle upon Tyne, England | |
| 13 | Win | 13–0 | Mindaugas Kulikauskas | PTS | 6 | 12 Oct 2002 | York Hall, London, England | |
| 12 | Win | 12–0 | Oleksandr Mileiko | TKO | 2 (6), 1:40 | 14 Sep 2002 | York Hall, London, England | |
| 11 | Win | 11–0 | Martin Roodtman | TKO | 1 (6), 2:55 | 4 May 2002 | York Hall, London, England | |
| 10 | Win | 10–0 | Tony Booth | TKO | 1 (6), 2:46 | 19 Jan 2002 | York Hall, London, England | |
| 9 | Win | 9–0 | Gordon Minorts | TKO | 3 (6), 0:38 | 24 Nov 2001 | York Hall, London, England | |
| 8 | Win | 8–0 | Gary Williams | TKO | 4 (4), 1:22 | 22 Sep 2001 | York Hall, London, England | |
| 7 | Win | 7–0 | Luke Simpkin | PTS | 6 | 9 Jun 2001 | York Hall, London, England | |
| 6 | Win | 6–0 | Mal Rice | TKO | 2 (6), 2:22 | 26 Mar 2001 | Conference Centre, London, England | |
| 5 | Win | 5–0 | Alexey Osokin | PTS | 4 | 24 Feb 2001 | York Hall, London, England | |
| 4 | Win | 4–0 | Eamon Glennon | KO | 1 (4), 2:57 | 27 Jan 2001 | York Hall, London, England | |
| 3 | Win | 3–0 | Geoff Hunter | TKO | 1 (4) | 13 Nov 2000 | York Hall, London, England | |
| 2 | Win | 2–0 | Gary Williams | PTS | 4 | 21 Oct 2000 | Conference Centre, London, England | |
| 1 | Win | 1–0 | Alvin Miller | TKO | 1 (4) | 23 Sep 2000 | York Hall, London, England | |
