= Dave Coldwell =

British boxer, boxing trainer

Personal information
- Nationality: British
- Born: Calcutta, India
- Height: 5 ft 3 in (160 cm)
- Weight: Flyweight

Boxing career

Boxing record
- Total fights: 19
- Wins: 6
- Win by KO: 2
- Losses: 13

Dave Coldwell is a British former professional boxer who competed from 1996 to 2000, worked as a promoter from 2003 to 2015 and is currently a boxing trainer and Boxing analyst and commentator on Sky Sports.

Coldwell currently trains Jordan Gill, Hopey Price and Lerrone Richards, having previously trained Tony Bellew. Coldwell trained Tony Bellew for his World Title fight for the vacant WBC cruiserweight belt against the favoured Ilunga Makabu at Goodison Park, Liverpool. Having lost in his previous two attempts to claim a world title, Bellew won on his third go with a stunning third round knockout of Ilunga Makabu. All of Coldwell's fighters are trained out of his own gym in Rotherham, England.

== Boxing career ==
Training out of the Ingle Gym established by Brendan Ingle in Wincobank, Sheffield, Dave had a limited number of amateur fights before his 19 fight pro career before engaging in the promotional side of the sport.

== Promotional career ==
Dave was head of boxing for Hayemaker promotions between 2008 and 2011, a promotional outfit owned by David Haye.
