= Untold: Jake Paul the Problem Child =

2023 documentary film about Jake Paul, directed by Andrew Renzi

- Promotional poster
- Directed by: Andrew Renzi
- Produced by: Chapman Way; Maclain Way; Howard Owens; Ben Silverman; Isabel San Vargas
- Starring: Jake Paul; Logan Paul
- Cinematography: Mattia Palombi; Jeff Louis Peterman; Charles Schwarzbeck
- Edited by: Taylor Alexander Ward
- Music by: Brocker Way; Ali Helnwein
- Production companies: Propagate Content; Stardust Frames
- Distributed by: Netflix
- Release date: August 1, 2023
- Running time: 72 minutes
- Country: United States
- Language: English

Untold: Jake Paul the Problem Child is a 2023 American biographical documentary film made for Netflix and directed by Andrew Renzi. Its subject is the social media and boxing career of Jake Paul. It is the first installment in the third season of the Untold documentary film series.

== Synopsis ==
Untold: Jake Paul the Problem Child tells the history of Jake Paul and, to some extent, his brother Logan Paul. The documentary covers their time on Vine as well as on YouTube, including showing clips from the videos they posted. There is some coverage of the sponsorship deals Jake received. It spends some time discussing the relationship between the brothers and their rivalry.

It covers Jake's time with the Disney Channel show Bizaardvark, and briefly mentions the sexual assault allegations he has faced as well as the FBI raid on his home in Calabasas, California. Some other controversies were also discussed briefly, such as Jake's use of the n-slur during a filming of him rapping, and his disregard for COVID-19 transmission prevention. It also discusses Logan's video in Japan's Aokigahara Forest in 2017.

At one point, Jake states that his father Greg hit him as a child. In denying the allegation, Greg admits to physically throwing Jake on a couch and uses homophobic language to justify himself. Logan corroborates that physical altercations occurred, though he chooses not to use the word abuse. Logan also states that both he and Greg were concerned at one point that Jake had developed suicidal ideation.

It shows footage from Jake's bouts and talk show appearances, as well as Jake's perception of boxing as a performance. The film spends some time highlighting Jake's marketing strategies, and how his fights have increased match viewership. It includes criticism of Jake's chosen opponents: former professional boxers, Nate Robinson, or fighters with the UFC. It also mentions Jake's use of his social media following in an attempt to highlight the treatment of UFC athletes.

== Cast ==
In alphabetical order, all as self:

- Graham Bensinger
- Nakisa Bidarian
- John Fury
- Tommy Fury
- Ariel Helwani
- KSI
- Greg Paul
- Jake Paul
- Logan Paul
- Danny Smith
- Pamela Stepnick
- Mike Tyson
- Larry Wade
- Dana White

== Production ==
Chapman and Maclain Way continued to serve as producers for the third season. Ryan Duffy served as the showrunner, and Andrew Renzi directed this installment. Renzi described the film as connecting the rise of influencers to the re-emergence of boxing. It was filmed in Puerto Rico.

Music for the film was composed by Brocker Way and Ali Helnwein, with Jessica Berndt and Chris Swanson choosing other songs that play during the film. We Like to Party! by the Vengaboys, Amsterdam (Opening) by Daniel Pemberton, and Drake's Money In the Grave featuring Rick Ross are included. A diss track by Diss Don and Logan Paul, as well as Jake's response video, also feature.

== Release ==
The film released on August 1, 2023 on Netflix, just prior to Jake's match with Nate Diaz on August 5 in Dallas.

Untold: Jake Paul the Problem Child had a run time of 72 minutes in its UK release, but Dutch television station NPO 1 recorded the run time as 82 minutes, as did the review website Film Fugitives.

== Themes ==
Following the premiere, multiple news outlets focused on the allegations of child abuse in the documentary. Jake's mental health is also discussed, both by Jake himself in mentioning how he did not like himself, and by Logan with his concerns over Jake potentially taking his own life.

Martin Cid Magazine commented that one of the key concerns addressed by the documentary is how far someone is willing to go to gain fame, noting that Jake states in the film that he and Logan would do "absurd and stupid things" in order to garner views and followers.

== Reception ==
=== Critical reception ===
Untold: Jake Paul the Problem Child received mixed reviews from critics.

Tim Bouwhuis, reviewing for FilmTotaal, rated the film one and a half out of five stars, noting that it feels superficial and that Jake's comment to his personal cameraman preventing him from recording might indicate that the documentary was never intended to be more than a presentation of Jake's existing profile. Giving it a rating of six and a half stars, NPO 1's reviewer noted that the film fails to garner the level of empathy it appears to have been aiming for because the negative aspects of Jake's life dominate the narrative. They also noted that it lacked depth, but would be interesting to Jake's fans or those wanting to learn about his marketing strategies.

While calling the film promotional, Ruben Praster of Veronica Superguide rated it three stars. Praster stated that the documentary made an effort to portray Jake as the next Muhammad Ali as well as "the savior of boxing." Praster noted that any critique is limited to archival footage, Jake's opponents, or Logan. With the exception of Logan, Praster stated that the critics are dismissed as "haters." Praster called it a well-crafted commercial that he found difficult to view as a serious endeavor. Greg Wheeler of The Review Geek noted that there are inaccuracies throughout the film. Wheeler commented that the filmmakers have omitted dates. Like Praster, Wheeler noted how Jake's critics are largely limited to recorded content rather than being included among the interviewees. Overall, Wheeler called it "a fluffy piece" that distorts history.

Jaschar Marktanner, reviewing for Film Rezensionen, noted that while the documentary is mostly neutral in the first half, when covering Jake and Logan's online history, it is told from Jake's perspective in the second half when discussing his boxing career. Marktanner commented that the boxing events are relayed inaccurately, effectively attempting to improve Jake's image. Marktanner acknowledged that Jake is good at the business of boxing while denigrating his skill in the ring. He rated the film a six out of ten. John Sooja, writing for Common Sense Media, only rated it a two out of five stars. Sooja commented on how the film glosses over Jake's past controversies, only mentioning a few of them, and "quickly becomes one long advertisement." Sooja did state that the film shows how Logan and Jake collaborate and capitalize on the hatred people have for them.

George Fitzmaurice of the New Statesman found the film to be "too self-aware," noting that it gives insight into Jake Paul's brand, but not him as a person. Steven Ross, writing for National World, described the story as "middle class to obscene wealth." Jasmine Valentine, reviewing for Why Now, rated the film four out of five stars. Valentine stated that the filmmakers were able to explain Jake's prior bad acts as a result of abuse and praised the portrayal of Jake's growth to becoming a focused boxer. Samuel Nichols, writing for SiftPop, acknowledged Jake's work toward becoming a professional boxer but also noted that Jake is not capable of providing the unfiltered truth about himself given his willingness to do "just about anything on camera" to market himself. Nichols also found Logan to be less than honest, but overall enjoyed the film.

Abraham Gonzalez, writing for FanSided, enjoyed the film, stating that it was able to engage the viewer. Gonzalez did note that it is only a portion of what could be covered, but stated that it would be enough to give viewers an insight into Jake before the Diaz bout. Scott Hines, reviewing for Decider, recommended watching the documentary, stating that it might appeal most to those who have heard Jake's name but know nothing about him. Hines also called the story "compelling" and "fascinating," particularly noting how the film shows Jake "develop respect" for boxing.

Joe Lucia, writing for Awful Announcing, admitted that the first half of the documentary did not appeal to him. He praised Renzi for including Jake's controversies and stated that the interviewees do not "whitewash" Jake's history. Lucia also appreciated the inclusion of material on Jake's dedication to boxing. He did comment that it would have benefited the documentary to have included more on Jake's fighters' union and whether it is a serious endeavor or just intended to provoke Dana White. He also noted that the filmmakers could have omitted the reactionary video clips from Jake's YouTube channel, calling them "excessive." Lucia did recommend the film to those interested in how Jake generates so much attention to his bouts.

Elizabeth de Luna, reviewing for Mashable, expressed concern over how the filmmakers framed Jake's dependence on boxing. de Luna commented that the entire series of films appears to be a vehicle for viewing sports as "a kind of savior," going on to condemn the marginalization of childhood abuse combined with the glorification of capitalizing on that trauma through physical violence. de Luna was also very critical of Logan, commenting on how he expects Jake to use boxing as a "coping mechanism for abuse." Nadeem Abdul, reviewing for The Envoy Web, also expressed concern regarding Logan's dismissive attitude towards Jake's mental health in how Logan justifies Greg's "abusive behavior." Abdul did find the film impressive overall. He enjoyed its pacing, though he expressed disappointment that Jake's mental health and the fighters' union Jake is trying to build did not get more coverage. While expressing concern over how Jake's trauma has shaped him, Brian Tallerico of RogerEbert.com commented that the documentary may have skimmed over mental health issues somewhat because Jake himself may not have been "ready for that." Tallerico also called the film the best of the third volume.

Smriti Kannan of Film Fugitives called the documentary "needless." Kannan noted that "conflict and catharsis" are absent from the film in the sense that Jake had the privilege of setting aside higher education to pursue boxing, and that his brand collaborations and finances have allowed Jake the privilege of "high-profile trainers and publicists." Kannan was critical of the filmmakers, stating that they could have shown deeper insight than an Internet search, and that the documentary feels very promotional. Kannan was also disappointed that the mental health discussion is superficial and noted that a longer film or a miniseries might have better suited its themes. Arpita Mondal, writing for Midgard Times, stated that while the film is engaging and well-paced, it is also "biased and superficial." Mondal specifically noted how the documentary only mentions the sexual assault allegations levied against Jake and the FBI raid on his California home once without really addressing them. Mondal also found it boring and repetitive at points and found it to be manipulative in its attempt to portray Jake as a more sympathetic individual. Mondal rated it a five out of ten.

Romey Norton, reviewing for Ready Steady Cut, stated that though the film does show how dangerous boxing can be, it also appears to have been "made for Jake Paul's ego." Norton noted that though the first half does cover some of the controversies in both Logan's and Jake's pasts, it lacks accountability. Norton also commented that the documentary showcases a good deal of aggressive behavior unrelated to boxing. She stated that the film keeps viewers' attention and is well paced. Sven Papaux, writing for Watson, stated that the film is a dissection of Jake's media persona.

Commenting on the soundtrack, Wilson Spiler of Flixlândia stated that it employs melodramatic tracks in an attempt to evoke an emotional response from viewers but does not manage to hit its mark.

=== Audience reception ===
The day after its release, Untold: Jake Paul the Problem Child ranked in the top ten movies on Netflix, a roster that had not changed for several days prior.

== See also ==
- 2023 in film

== Sources ==
- "Review Untold: Jake Paul the Problem Child: streamen of skippen?" [Review Untold: Jake Paul the Problem Child: stream or skip?]. NPO 1 (in Dutch). August 1, 2023.
- "Untold: Jake Paul The Problem Child". British Board of Film Classification. July 31, 2023.
- ""Untold: Jake Paul the Problem Child" (2023) Documentary on Netflix about the eccentric boxer and YouTuber". Martin Cid Magazine. September 2, 2024 [August 1, 2023].
- Abdul, Nadeem (August 1, 2023). "Untold: Jake Paul the Problem Child review: Gives an insightful perspective into a despicable individual". The Envoy Web.
- Bouwhuis, Tim (August 3, 2023). "Untold: Jake Paul the Problem Child [Netflix] (2023)". FilmTotaal (in Dutch).
- Bucholtz, Andrew (August 3, 2023). "Chapman and Maclain Way talk 'Untold: Vol. 3.': 'Audiences really connect with stories that are raw.'". Awful Announcing.
- Chilton, Louis (August 6, 2023). "Jake Paul: Biggest moments from boxer and YouTube star's Netflix documentary". The Independent.
- Copson, Josie (August 2, 2023). "Jake Paul alleges father physically abused him in Netflix documentary". Metro.
- de Groot, Bram (August 3, 2023). "Provocerende Netflix Original is Netflix nu helemaal aan het veroveren" [Provocative Netflix Original is taking the platform by storm]. FilmTotaal (in Dutch).
- de Luna, Elizabeth (August 3, 2023). "In Netflix's Jake Paul documentary, abuse is just a necessary evil". Mashable.
- Deen, Said (August 2, 2023). "'He's going to save boxing': Mike Tyson raves about Jake Paul in Netflix documentary". USA Today. Archived from the original on August 3, 2023.
- Dye, Natasha (August 1, 2023). "Jake Paul Claims His Father Would Physically Abuse Him: 'My Dad Would Slap the S--t Out of Me'". People.
- Fenner, Rachel (August 2, 2023). "Netflix doco reveals Logan Paul feared brother Jake would kill himself over online hate early in career". Perth Now.
- Fitzmaurice, George (August 25, 2023). "Jake Paul's cynical self-promotion". New Statesman. Archived from the original on August 26, 2023.
- Furdyk, Brent (July 29, 2023). "'Jake Paul The Problem Child': First Look At Netflix 'Untold' Documentary About Controversial YouTuber-Turned-Boxer". Entertainment Tonight Canada. Archived from the original on July 29, 2023.
- Gaines, Cork (August 1, 2023). "Jake Paul defends dad after accusing him of abuse: 'That's all he knew'". Business Insider.
- Gonzalez, Abraham (August 2, 2023). "Netflix UNTOLD: Jake Paul the Problem Child premiers, how to watch". FanSided.
- Hearon, Sarah (August 1, 2023). "'Untold: Jake Paul the Problem Child' Recap: Paul Brothers on Childhood Abuse, Controversies and More". Us Weekly.
- Hines, Scott (August 1, 2023). "Stream It Or Skip It: 'UNTOLD: Jake Paul The Problem Child' on Netflix, a Look at the YouTube Star Turned Pro Boxer". Decider.
- Hough, Q.V. (August 24, 2023). "Soundtracks of Cinema: 'Untold: Jake Paul the Problem Child'". Vague Visages. Archived from the original on August 24, 2023.
- Kannan, Smriti (August 1, 2023). "'Untold: Jake Paul, The Problem Child' Review/Recap: A Needless Documentary On A Man-Child Celebrity". Film Fugitives.
- Lucia, Joe (July 31, 2023). "Netflix's 'Untold: Jake Paul the Problem Child' is surprisingly entertaining, insightful". Awful Announcing.
- Maglio, Tony (August 1, 2023). "Forget the Duffers — Chapman and Maclain Way Are the Brothers to Watch on Netflix". IndieWire. Archived from the original on August 1, 2023.
- Marktanner, Jaschar (August 1, 2023). "Untold: Jake Paul the Problem Child". Film Rezensionen (in German).
- Mondal, Arpita (August 1, 2023). "'Untold: Jake Paul the Problem Child' Netflix Review - A Documentary that Will Shock and Amaze You". Midgard Times.
- Nichols, Samuel (August 8, 2023). "Untold – Jake Paul: The Problem Child (Streaming Show Review)". SiftPop.
- Norton, Romey (July 31, 2023). "Untold: Jake Paul the Problem Child Review – A professional boxer or celebrity showman?". Ready Steady Cut.
- Nungesser, Samantha (August 1, 2023). "Jake Paul Accuses His Father of Child Abuse in 'Untold' Netflix Documentary: "My Dad Would Slap the Sh*t Out of Me"". Decider.
- Pandey, Manish (August 2, 2023). "Jake Paul: YouTuber claims his dad physically abused him". BBC News.
- Papaux, Sven (August 4, 2023). "Jake Paul le méchant youtubeur-boxeur validé par Mike Tyson" [Jake Paul, the bad boy Youtuber-cum-boxer, is validated by Mike Tyson]. Watson (in French).
- Praster, Ruben (November 12, 2024). "Untold: Jake Paul the Problem Child is een promotiepraatje: 'Lastig om serieus te nemen'" [Untold: Jake Paul the Problem Child is an advertisement: 'Hard to take seriously']. Veronica Superguide (in Dutch).
- Renzi, Andrew (August 4, 2023). "Did Jake Paul Save Boxing, or Did Boxing Save Jake Paul? Untold Director Tells Us What Surprised Him Most". MovieMaker (Interview). Interviewed by Margeaux Sippell.
- Ross, Steven (August 1, 2023). "Untold: Jake Paul the Problem Child: Netflix release date of documentary on YouTuber turned professional boxer". National World.
- Saha, Joy (August 3, 2023). ""Untold: Jake Paul the Problem Child": The 6 most eye-opening revelations from Netflix's doc". Salon. Archived from the original on August 4, 2023.
- Sooja, John (August 3, 2023). "Parents Guide to Untold: Jake Paul the Problem Child". Common Sense Media.
- Spiler, Wilson (August 2, 2023). "'Jake Paul, O Garoto Problema' dá continuidade à série 'Untold' sem inovações" ['Jake Paul: The Problem Child' continues the 'Untold' series without innovation]. Flixlândia (in Portuguese).
- Tallerico, Brian (July 26, 2023). "Netflix's Untold Returns with Four New Deep Dives into Sports History". RogerEbert.com. Archived from the original on July 26, 2023.
- Valentine, Jasmine (July 31, 2023). "Untold: Jake Paul The Problem Child review: Is this the redemption of Jake Paul?". Why Now.
- Wheeler, Greg (August 2, 2023). "Untold: Jake Paul the Problem Child (2023) Review – A problematic documentary for a problematic personality". The Review Geek.
