= Molly-Mae Hague =

British reality television personality (born 1999)

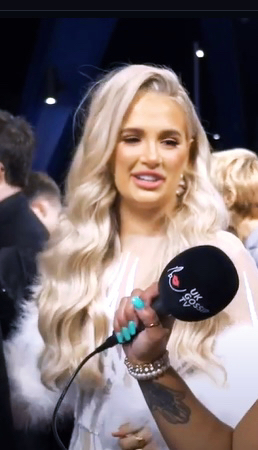
- Hague in 2020
- Born: 26 May 1999 (age 27); Stevenage, Hertfordshire, England
- Occupations: Social media influencer; television personality; businesswoman
- Years active: 2018–present
- Partner: Tommy Fury (2019-present)
- Children: 2

Molly-Mae Hague (born 26 May 1999) is an English social media influencer, television personality and businesswoman. Whilst launching her career as an influencer, she became a contestant on the fifth series of the ITV2 dating show Love Island in 2019, where she finished as a runner-up alongside her partner Tommy Fury. In 2023, she began appearing in the Netflix documentary series At Home with the Furys. Hague was a brand ambassador for PrettyLittleThing before stepping down in 2023 to focus on motherhood. She launched her clothing brand, Maebe in 2024.

== Early life ==
Molly-Mae Hague was born on 26 May 1999 in Stevenage and grew up in Hitchin, Hertfordshire. Her parents were both police officers. She has one sister. She attended The Priory School, Hitchin. As a teenager, Hague participated in beauty pageants, being crowned Miss Teen Hertfordshire in 2015 and World Teen Supermodel UK in 2016, going on to be awarded first runner-up at the international competition.

== Career ==
In 2019, Hague entered the fifth series of Love Island on Day 4. She coupled up with Tommy Fury and the pair made it to the final and they finished in second place. She also appeared on a spin-off starring Fury and Curtis Pritchard called The Boxer & The Ballroom Dancer and made an appearance in an episode of Tyson Fury: The Gypsy King. Hague's Instagram following reportedly grew from 160,000 to almost three million during her time in the Love Island villa. In a June 2021 interview with Cosmopolitan, Hague discussed her social media career prior to appearing on Love Island, revealing that she had accumulated approximately 8,000 Instagram followers by the age of 16 and had begun earning money through influencing before joining the programme.

After leaving Love Island, Hague reportedly signed a £500,000 deal with PrettyLittleThing and in August 2021 was hired as the firm's creative director after previously working as a brand ambassador. During her time in the role, Hague worked alongside the company’s creative and brand teams, as she took on an active role in directing upcoming advertising campaigns and selecting new influencers and talent to represent the retailer across the UK and Europe. In February 2022, Hague presented her first London Fashion Week show in collaboration with PrettyLittleThing. The collection featured 37 outfits and it aimed to promote inclusivity, featuring models of different sizes and ethnicities.

Hague launched her own tanning brand, Filter by Molly-Mae, in December 2019, several months after appearing on Love Island. The company was incorporated in November 2019, with Hague registered as a director. This launch marked a move from promoting other companies beauty products to developing and selling products under her own brand. The initial collection included four products: two tanning mousses, available in two shades, and two application mitts in different sizes. According to the launch information reported by Marie Claire, the formulas were all perfume and allergen-free, due to Hague’s personal experience of eczema. Since its launch, the product range has expanded beyond the original tanning mousses and mitts. Other products now include face and body self-tanning drops, alongside other tanning formulas. Filter products have also been listed by major retailers, including Selfridges. The development of Filter represented one of Hague’s early independent business ventures following her appearance on television.

Hague has also secured sponsorship and brand deals, including with Starbucks. In September 2020, Hague partnered with Starbucks UK to promote the return of its Pumpkin Spice Latte. She described this partnership as one of the biggest opportunities of her career at the time, as the campaign marked her position as Starbucks’ first UK ambassador.

In August 2023, Hague appeared in the Netflix documentary series At Home with the Furys alongside her boyfriend Tommy Fury, which follows the lives of boxer Tyson Fury and his family.

In September 2024, Hague announced the launch of her own womenswear brand called Maebe, following three years of development. The brand aimed to create a contemporary line of clothing that fits every occasion as it focused on minimalist styles. Hague noted that thus project became her personal ambition and explained that she had chosen to fund it herself, without external investors, in order to maintain independence over the business. Before the online launch, Maebe held a pop-up event in London on 20 September 2024, this allowed customers to view and purchase pieces from the debut collection. The collection became available through the brand’s website on 29 September 2024. It included items such as oversized blazers, knitwear, denim and basic tops, with prices ranging from £35 to £140. The launch attracted considerable attention from Hague’s social media following. According to British Vogue, the Maebe Instagram account had gained 800,000 followers within days of its announcement, while more than 2,000 people attending the London pop-up. The publication also reported that the first collection sold out within 24 minutes of becoming availed online.

In November 2024, Amazon Prime Video announced Molly-Mae: Behind It All, consisting of six episodes that follow Hague’s personal and professional life. The series included her personal experience of motherhood, her separation from Tommy Fury and the development of her fashion brand, Maebe. The first three episodes premiered on 17 January 2025, while the last three aired on 9 May 2025. In September 2025, the series won the Authored Documenty award at the National Television Awards. Hague received the award on 10 September and was selected as the winner based on public voting. Other documentaries included There’s Only One Rob Burrow, Flintoff and Strictly Amy: Cancer and Me. In June 2025, the second season was announced. The second season continued to follow similar aspects of Hague’s life that were shown in the first season. One of the main moments featured was her debut on the L’Oréal runway in Paris Fashion Week in September 2025. The documentary showed Hague preparing for the catwalk, including her concerns about body confidence and choosing an outfit for the event. She eventually walked at the catwalk alongside other celebrities such as Kendall Jenner.

In March 2026, Hague appeared on The Great Stand Up to Cancer Bake Off on Channel 4. Hague was among other contents and like JoJo Siwa and Richard Herring. The contestants participated in three baking tasks, including the making of tray bakes, tarts tatin, and biscuit decorating inspired by their childhood toys. Hague was then declared the winner of the episode and received her star baker apron.

In January 2026, Hague announced a footwear collaboration with Adidas, she stated that the project was a personal ambition and had been developing for some time. The partnership involved Hague taking an active role in the design of a limited-edition footwear collection. The collection was launched in April 2026 and included two reimagined models of shoes: the Adidas Samba and Superstars II. The Samba featured a matcha-green colour scheme with off-white and pink double laces, with the Superstar II was designed in cream and brown shades inspired by iced coffee. Both pairs were priced at £100 and became available on 9 April. Hague described the collaboration as a chance to combine her style with the two establish Adidas designs. The collection represents a further expansion of her work in fashion, after her launch of Maebe in 2024.

== Controversies ==
In March 2021, Hague was reprimanded for running an £8,000 online prize draw on Instagram that failed to follow the advertising regulations for such competitions. The Advertising Standards Authority ruled she had been unable to provide evidence the winners had been randomly and fairly picked.

In December 2021, Hague appeared as a guest on Steven Bartlett's The Diary of a CEO podcast which was uploaded to YouTube. In the interview, she made comments on poverty and wealth inequality, which were described as "tone deaf" and "Thatcherite". Hague suggested that those less fortunate than herself in their upbringing only had themselves to blame for their lack of financial stability, stating that "we all have the same 24 hours in a day". These remarks were criticised and led to calls for her resignation as PrettyLittleThing's creative director.

In July 2022, an Instagram post by her was banned due to being an advertisement without making that intent clear.

== Personal life ==
Hague is in a relationship with boxer Tommy Fury, whom she met on Love Island in 2019. They lived together in Cheshire before moving to Hale, Greater Manchester. Their first child, a daughter, was born in January 2023. They became engaged on 23 July 2023. In August 2024, Hague announced that their relationship had ended. In May 2025, Hague announced that she and Fury were back together. Their second child, a son, was born in June 2026. The baby's name, Midas, was revealed during one of Fury's boxing matches.

== Filmography ==
Television roles
Year	Title	Role	Notes	Ref.
2019	Love Island	Contestant	Series 5; Runner-up	
2023–present	At Home with the Furys	Herself	Series	
2024	Behind It All	Herself	Authored documentary; two seasons	
2026	The Great British Bake Off	Contestant	Series 9; for Stand Up to Cancer (UK)	

== Awards ==
Year	Award	Category	Work	Result	Ref.
2025	National Television Awards	Authored documentary	Behind It All	Won	
