= John Fury =

Irish boxer (born 1965)

Personal information
- Born: 22 May 1965 (age 61) Tuam, County Galway, Ireland
- Height: 6 ft 3 in (191 cm)
- Children: 6, including Tyson and Tommy

Boxing career

Boxing record
- Total fights: 13
- Wins: 8
- Win by KO: 1
- Losses: 4
- Draws: 1

John Fury (born 22 May 1965) is an Irish-British boxing cornerman and former professional boxer and bare-knuckle fighter. He is best known for being the father of two-time heavyweight boxing world champion Tyson Fury. He is uncle to heavyweight boxer Hughie Fury.

== Early life ==
John Fury was born on 22 May 1965 in Tuam, Galway, Ireland, into a family of Irish Traveller heritage. He moved to Manchester, England, at the age of four due to his father not being able to find work in his native Ireland. Fury claims descent from a long line of bare-knuckle fighters.

== Professional career ==
Fury's professional boxing career spanned eight years, beginning in April 1987 and ending in June 1995. In total, he was involved in 13 bouts.

He made his professional debut on 28 April 1987 when he lost to rugby league player Adam Fogerty in Halifax, West Yorkshire. From there Fury went on to win his next six fights until a draw with David Hopkins in Helsinki on 13 February 1989.

Fury finished his career with a record of 8–4–1.

== Public image ==
Fury has been involved in many high-profile situations whilst supporting his son Tyson. After Tyson Fury defeated reigning 11-year champion Wladimir Klitschko in Düsseldorf on 27 November 2015, John Fury criticised the media for their lack of faith, exhorted them to "stop being yes men" then ordered everybody in the room to give his son a standing ovation for his achievement.

In March 2022, Fury was confirmed as a brand ambassador for the sports betting website, Freebets.com.

In 2023, Fury appeared in the Netflix documentary Untold: Jake Paul the Problem Child.

== Criminal conviction ==
In 2011, Fury was found guilty of wounding with intent to cause grievous bodily harm (GBH) for gouging a man's eye out in a brawl in 2010. He was handed an 11-year sentence. The victim was left half-blind after a 12-year dispute erupted in violence at a car auction in 2010, with Fury getting the victim in a headlock and forcing his fingers into the victim's eyes. He was released from prison in February 2015.

== Professional boxing record ==
13 fights	8 wins	4 losses
By knockout	1	2
By decision	7	2
Draws	1	

No.	Result	Record	Opponent	Type	Round, time	Date	Location	Notes
13	Loss	8–4–1	Steve Garber	KO	4 (6), 2:11	10 Jun 1995	G-Mex Centre, Manchester, England	
12	Loss	8–3–1	Henry Akinwande	KO	3 (8)	9 Oct 1991	G-Mex Centre, Manchester, England	
11	Win	8–2–1	Cesare Di Benedetto	PTS	10	16 Feb 1991	Pavilion, Thornaby, England	
10	Win	7–2–1	Michael Murray	RTD	6 (8), 3:00	2 Jun 1990	G-Mex Centre, Manchester, England	
9	Loss	6–2–1	Neil Malpass	PTS	10	21 Jun 1989	Brodsworth Miners Welfare Club, Doncaster, England	For vacant Central Area heavyweight title
8	Draw	6–1–1	David Hopkins	MD	6	13 Feb 1989	Töölö Sports Hall, Helsinki, Finland	
7	Win	6–1	Abner Blackstock	PTS	8	26 Sep 1988	Grand Hotel, Leicester, England	
6	Win	5–1	Ian Priest	PTS	6	29 Mar 1988	European SC, Kings Hall, Stoke-on-Trent, England	
5	Win	4–1	Michael Murray	PTS	6	23 Feb 1988	Civic Sports Centre, Oldham, England	
4	Win	3–1	Mick Cordon	PTS	6	3 Dec 1987	Irish Centre, Leeds, England	
3	Win	2–1	Paul Sheldon	PTS	4	10 Nov 1987	Variety Club, Batley, England	
2	Win	1–1	Steve Garber	PTS	6	7 Oct 1987	Cat's Whiskers, Lancashire, England	
1	Loss	0–1	Adam Fogerty	PTS	4	28 Apr 1987	North Bridge Leisure Centre, Halifax, England	

== Filmography ==
Key
†	Denotes films that have not yet been released

Film
Year	Title	Role	Notes	Ref.
2022	Tyson Fury: Redemption	Himself	Documentary film	
2023	Untold: Jake Paul the Problem Child	Himself	Documentary film	
2024	Battle of the Baddest	Himself	Documentary film	
2024	Undisputed	Himself	Documentary film	
2026	Tyson Fury †	Himself	Documentary film	

Television
Year	Title	Role	Notes	Ref.
2023–26	At Home with the Furys	Himself	Recurring	
2025	Tommy: The Good. The Bad. The Fury.	Himself	Recurring	
