= Behind the Mask: My Autobiography =

2019 autobiography by Tyson Fury

- First edition
- Author: Tyson Fury
- Language: English
- Genre: Autobiography
- Publisher: Penguin Random House
- Publication date: 14 November 2019
- Pages: 304
- ISBN: 978-1-5291-2486-6

Behind the Mask: My Autobiography is an autobiography by Tyson Fury. It was published by Penguin Random House imprint Century on 14 November 2019. It details the story of how Fury defeated the long-reigning unified heavyweight world champion Wladimir Klitschko in 2015, his struggles with mental health following the win and his subsequent recovery process.

Behind the Mask reached the number-one bestseller position on Amazon within 24 hours of its release.
