= Tommy Fury =

British professional boxer and reality television personality (born 1999)

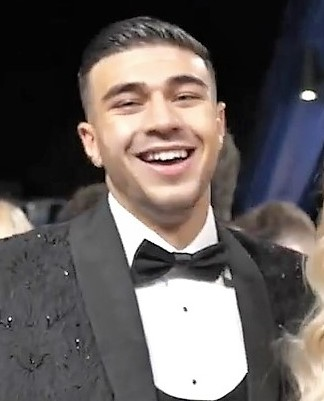
- Fury in 2020

Personal information
- Nickname: TNT
- Born: Thomas Michael John Fury; 7 May 1999 (age 27) Manchester, England
- Height: 6 ft 1 in (185 cm)
- Weight: Light heavyweight; Cruiserweight
- Children: 2
- Father: John Fury
- Relatives: Tyson Fury (half-brother); Hughie Fury (cousin)

Boxing career
- Partner: Molly-Mae Hague (2019–present)
- Reach: 80 in (203 cm)
- Stance: Orthodox

Boxing record
- Total fights: 11
- Wins: 11
- Win by KO: 4

Thomas Michael John Fury (born 7 May 1999) is a British reality television personality and professional boxer. He took time off from his boxing career in 2019 to star in the fifth series of the ITV2 dating reality television show Love Island. Along with his current partner, Molly-Mae Hague, he finished as a runner-up of the series. He is the younger brother of former world heavyweight boxing champion Tyson Fury.

== Early life ==
Thomas Michael John Fury was born on 7 May 1999 in Manchester, England. His father, John Fury, is of Irish Traveller descent, while his mother, Chantal, is of Mauritian descent. His half-brother is former heavyweight world champion Tyson Fury.

== Boxing career ==
=== Early career ===
On 22 December 2018, Fury made his professional boxing debut, defeating Jevgenijs Andrejevs (10–102–3) at Manchester Arena in Manchester, scoring a four-round points decision victory (40–36). In his second bout on 23 March 2019, Fury defeated Callum Ide (0–26–2) via knockout in the 1st round at Leicester Arena in Leicester.

In 2019, Fury took part in Love Island, effectively, halting his boxing career. Fury returned on 21 December fought Przemyslaw Binienda (2–26) at the Copper Box Arena in London, defeating him via technical knockout in the 1st round. On 13 November 2020, Fury defeated Genadij Krajevskij (0–11) via knockout in the 2nd round.

On 27 February 2021 at the Copper Box Arena, Tommy Fury fought Scott Williams (0–9), defeating him via technical knockout in the 2nd round.

On 5 June 2021, Fury defeated Jordan Grant (2–0) via a points decision victory (40–36). On 29 August, Fury fought mixed martial artist Anthony Taylor (0–1) on the undercard of Jake Paul vs. Tyron Woodley. Fury won by unanimous decision with 40–36 on all three judges' scorecards.

=== Fury vs. Paul ===
After defeating Taylor on Paul's undercard, it was announced that the two would headline on 18 December at the Amalie Arena in Tampa, Florida, US. However, on 6 December, Fury withdrew due to a bacterial chest infection and a broken rib. Fury was replaced by mixed martial artist Tyron Woodley. Fury vs Paul was then rescheduled for 2 August 2022 at Madison Square Garden in New York City, US. However, Fury withdrew again due to being denied entry into the US and was replaced by Hasim Rahman Jr.

After withdrawing, Fury returned to the ring on the undercard of his brother Tyson Fury's fight against Dillian Whyte on 23 April 2022 at Wembley Stadium in London, in which he defeated Daniel Bocianski (10–1) via points decision victory. After defeating Bocianski, Fury called out Paul.

On 27 January, it was announced that Fury vs Paul was rescheduled a third time for 26 February at the Diriyah Arena in Diriyah, Saudi Arabia. Fury defeated Paul via split decision with one judge scoring the fight (75–74) to Paul, while the other two judges scored it (76–73) to Fury.

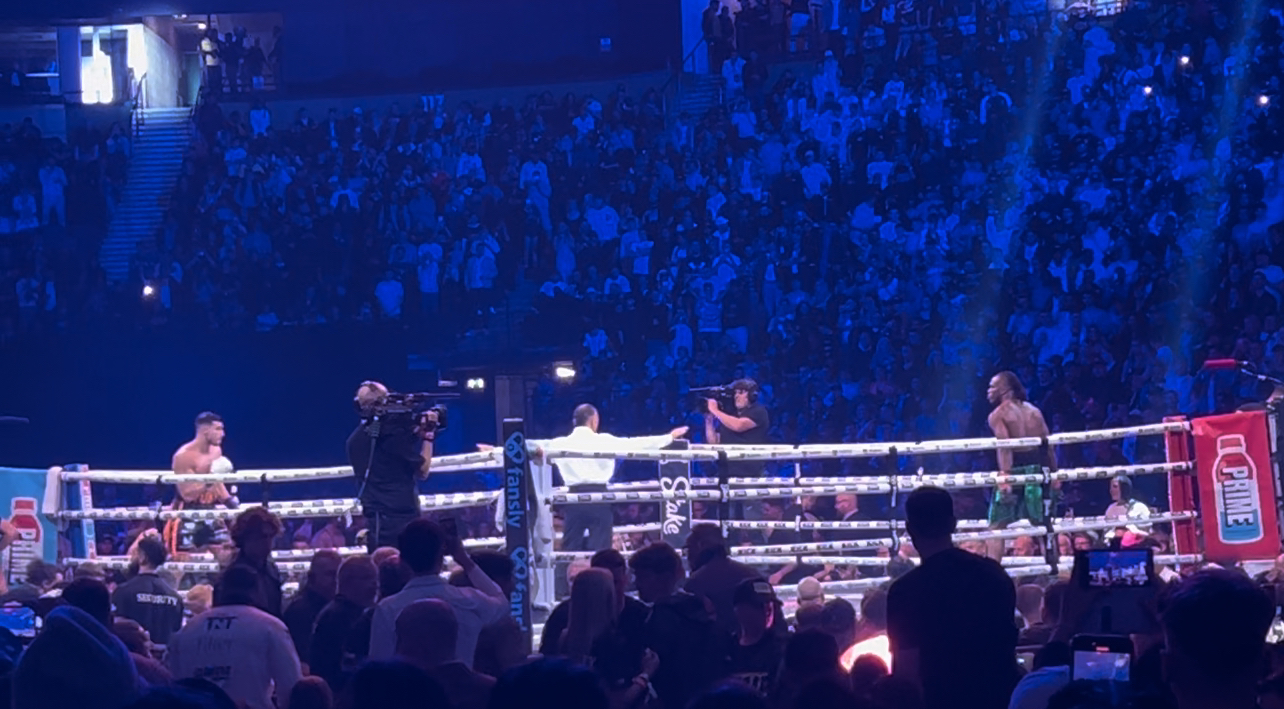
Fury fighting KSI at Manchester Arena, Manchester

=== Fury vs. Lambert ===
On 4 October 2022, it was announced that Fury would face American boxer Paul Bamba (5–2) as the co-feature bout to Floyd Mayweather Jr. vs Deji at the Coca-Cola Arena in Dubai, UAE. However, during the weigh-in on 12 November, Bamba weighed in at 176.6 Ibs while Fury weighed in at 181.4 Ibs. Both fighters stated that they made the weight that was stated in their contract. Bamba refused to fight, and on 13 November, the day of the fight, Bamba was replaced with Cameroon boxer Rolly Lambert (15–1–1) who held the WBO Africa, WBC and WBA Asian titles, for an exhibition fight. During the bout, Fury and Lambert were booed while Fury's rival Jake Paul was on commentary, which led to Fury calling out Paul to a bout.

=== Fury vs. KSI ===
In November 2019, British YouTuber KSI defeated American YouTuber Logan Paul via split decision. Afterwards, Fury called out KSI to a bout, which KSI later declined as he wanted to focus on his music career. On 30 July 2023, it was announced that Fury would face KSI on 14 October at Manchester Arena in Manchester, England headlining MF & DAZN: X Series 10 – The Prime Card. In a closely contested affair that consisted of both boxers clinching excessively, Fury defeated KSI after six rounds via unanimous decision: all three judges scored the bout 57–56 in Fury's favour. The result was originally announced as a majority decision, with judge Rafael Ramos' scorecard being incorrectly tallied to 57–57.

=== Cancelled bout with Darren Till ===
On 17 November 2024, it was announced that Fury would face English mixed martial artist Darren Till on 18 January 2025 as the headlining bout for X Series 20 in Manchester, England at the Co-op Live. "It feels great to, finally, say that I am back," said Fury. "I have been out of the ring far too long."

However, on 6 December, Fury announced on his Instagram that he had withdrawn from the fight, after Till said if he was losing the fight he would resort to "MMA tactics". Fury's previous opponent Anthony Taylor stepped in to face Till.

On 14 April 2025, Fury took to Twitter to announce his return after over 18 months of inactivity in the ring. He announced he would be fighting in Budapest, Hungary against an unknown opponent. It was later announced Fury would be fighting Bosnian boxer, Kenan Hanjalic (5–1) on 9 May at the MTK Arena. Fury won the 6 round fight by unanimous decision.

=== Fury vs. Hall ===
In January 2026, Fury began teasing a "massive" fight announcement for 2026. On 25 March, Manchester Arena's social media account accidentally posted a flier promoting a bout between Fury and Eddie Hall set for 13 June as the headliner for Misfits 23. Later that day, Talksport confirmed the bout and stated an announcement for Misfits 23 was imminent in the coming days. On 27 March, Misfits Boxing formally announced the bout on social media for June 13 as an MF–professional bout at Manchester Arena, Manchester, with the billing "Beauty vs. The Beast", referencing the classic fairy tale Beauty and the Beast. On the night, the bout included three unofficial judges; Tony Bellew, Derek Chisora, and Chase DeMoor, who scored the bout (58–56, 59–56, 57–57) in favour of Fury.

== Television career ==
=== Love Island ===
In June 2019, he took part in the fifth series of the ITV2 dating reality show Love Island, finishing as a runner-up alongside girlfriend Molly-Mae Hague.

=== Other appearances ===
In December 2019, Fury appeared on an ITV2 series The Boxer and The Ballroom Dancer alongside fellow Love Island contestant Curtis Pritchard. They swapped careers, with Fury trying ballroom dancing and Pritchard taking up boxing.

In August 2023, Fury appeared in the Netflix series At Home with the Furys.

In November 2024, it was announced that Fury had withdrawn from the line up of series 24 of British survival reality television show I'm a Celebrity...Get Me Out of Here!, after receiving a better offer, at the time reported to be a rematch with KSI. The announcement came before the official lineup for the series had been revealed.

== Personal life ==
In 2019, Fury began a relationship with social media influencer Molly-Mae Hague, whom he met on the fifth series of Love Island. They lived together in Cheshire before moving to Hale, Greater Manchester. Their first child, a daughter, was born in January 2023. They became engaged in July 2023. In August 2024, Fury and Hague announced that they had ended their relationship. In May 2025, the couple announced they were back together. Their second child, a son, was born in June 2026. Fury revealed their son's name Midas during the boxing match against Eddie Hall.

In 2025, Fury stated that he had struggled with alcoholism, believing it was the reason behind his split with Hague in 2024. He said he had turned to alcohol in an attempt to experience the same "endorphins" he would feel when he finished boxing.

In a 2025 interview, Fury stated that he identifies as Christian, and that from ages 10 to 12 he was an altar boy.

== Boxing record ==
=== Professional ===
11 fights	11 wins	0 losses
By knockout	4	0
By decision	7	0

No.	Result	Record	Opponent	Type	Round, time	Date	Location	Notes
11	Win	11–0	Kenan Hanjalic	UD	6	9 May 2025	MTK Sportpark, Budapest, Hungary	
10	Win	10–0	KSI	UD	6	14 Oct 2023	Manchester Arena, Manchester, England	Originally scored MD win for Fury
9	Win	9–0	Jake Paul	SD	8	26 Feb 2023	Diriyah Arena, Diriyah, Saudi Arabia	
8	Win	8–0	Daniel Bocianski	PTS	6	23 Apr 2022	Wembley Stadium, London, England	
7	Win	7–0	Anthony Taylor	UD	4	29 Aug 2021	Rocket Mortgage FieldHouse, Cleveland, Ohio, US	
6	Win	6–0	Jordan Grant	PTS	4	5 Jun 2021	Telford International Centre, Telford, England	
5	Win	5–0	Scott Williams	TKO	2 (4), 2:05	27 Feb 2021	Copper Box Arena, London, England	
4	Win	4–0	Genadij Krajevskij	KO	2 (4), 2:56	13 Nov 2020	BT Sport Studio, London, England	
3	Win	3–0	Przemyslaw Binienda	TKO	1 (6), 1:02	21 Dec 2019	Copper Box Arena, London, England	
2	Win	2–0	Callum Ide	KO	1 (4), 1:34	23 Mar 2019	Leicester Arena, Leicester, England	
1	Win	1–0	Jevgenijs Andrejevs	PTS	4	22 Dec 2018	Manchester Arena, Manchester, England	

=== Exhibition ===
2 fights	1 win	0 losses
By decision	1	0
Non-scored	1	

No.	Result	Record	Opponent	Type	Round, time	Date	Location	Notes
2	Win	1–0 (1)	Eddie Hall	MD	6	13 Jun 2026	Manchester Arena, Manchester, England	No winner officially declared, though unofficial scorecard read (58–56, 59–56, 57–57) in favour of Fury.
1	—N/a	0–0 (1)	Rolly Lambert	—N/a	6	13 Nov 2022	Coca-Cola Arena, Dubai, UAE	Non-scored bout

== Pay-per-view bouts ==
United Kingdom
No.	Date	Fight	Billing	Network	Buys	Revenue	Source(s)
1	14 October 2023	KSI vs Fury	The Prime Card	DAZN	1,300,000	£26,000,000	
2	13 June 2026	Fury vs Hall	Beauty vs. The Beast	DAZN	Upcoming		—N/a
Total					1,300,000	£26,000,000	

United States
No.	Date	Fight	Billing	Network	Buys	Revenue	Source(s)
1	26 February 2023	Paul vs Fury	The Truth	ESPN+	800,000	$38,750,000	
Total					800,000	$38,750,000	

== Filmography ==
Key
†	Denotes films that have not yet been released

Film
Year	Title	Role	Notes	Ref.
2023	Untold: Jake Paul the Problem Child	Himself	Documentary	
TBA	The Debt Inherited †	Johnny	Post-production	

Television
Year	Title	Role	Notes	Ref.
2019	Love Island	Himself	Series 5; 50 episodes	
2019	Supermarket Sweep	Himself	Cameo	
2019	The Boxer and The Ballroom Dancer	Himself	Season 1; Episodes 1, 2 and 3	
2020	Tyson Fury: The Gypsy King	Himself	Season 1; Episode 2	
2021	All Access: Paul vs. Woodley	Himself	Docuseries	
2023–present	At Home with the Furys	Himself	Recurring	
2025	Tommy: The Good. The Bad. The Fury			
