= Tyson Fury =

British boxer (born 1988)

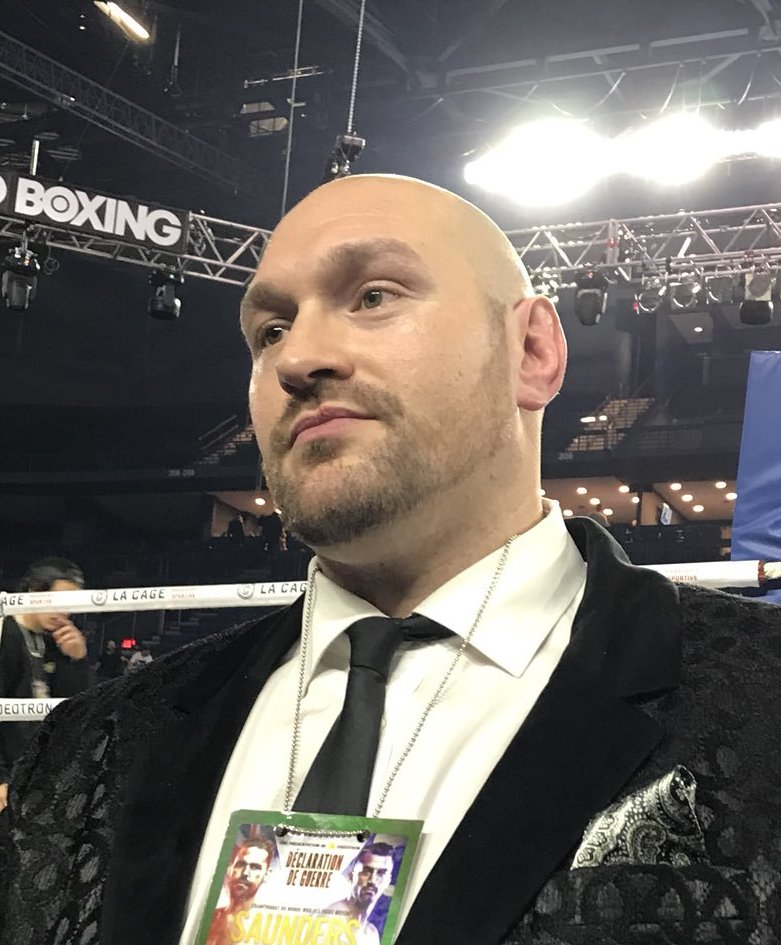
- Fury in 2017

Personal information
- Nickname: The Gypsy King
- Born: Tyson Luke Fury; 12 August 1988 (age 38) Manchester, England
- Height: 6 ft 9 in (206 cm)
- Weight: Heavyweight
- Father: John Fury
- Relatives: Tommy Fury (half-brother); Hughie Fury (cousin)

Boxing career
- Reach: 85 in (216 cm)
- Stance: Orthodox (Note: Listed by BoxRec as orthodox, but regularly switch-hits as a southpaw.)

Boxing record
- Total fights: 39
- Wins: 36
- Win by KO: 25
- Losses: 2
- Draws: 1
Medal record
Men's amateur boxing
Representing England
World Junior Championships
Bronze medal – third place	2006 Agadir	Super-heavyweight
English National Championships
Gold medal – first place	2008 London	Super-heavyweight
Representing Ireland
EU Junior Championships
Gold medal – first place	2007 Warsaw	Super-heavyweight
European Junior Championships
Silver medal – second place	2007 Sombor	Super-heavyweight

Tyson Luke Fury (born 12 August 1988) is a British professional boxer. He held multiple world heavyweight championships, including unified (Note: World Boxing Association (WBA) (Super version), International Boxing Federation (IBF), and World Boxing Organization (WBO) titles) titles from 2015 to 2016, the Ring magazine title twice between 2015 and 2022, and the World Boxing Council (WBC) title from 2020 to 2024. He also held the International Boxing Organization (IBO) title during his first reign as champion.

At regional level, he held multiple heavyweight championships, including the British title twice between 2011 and 2015; the European title from 2014 to 2015; and the Commonwealth title from 2011 to 2012. As an amateur, he won a bronze medal at the 2006 World Junior Championships; gold at the 2007 EU Junior Championships; silver at the 2007 European Junior Boxing Championships; and won the ABA super-heavyweight title in 2008.

In 2015, his victorious fight against Wladimir Klitschko was named Upset of the Year and earned him Fighter of the Year by The Ring. In 2018, his drawn fight against Deontay Wilder was named Round of the Year and earned him Comeback of the Year by The Ring. In 2020, his rematch defeat of Deontay Wilder earned him Fighter of the Year for a second time, and Fury became the third heavyweight, after Floyd Patterson and Muhammad Ali, to hold The Ring magazine title twice. In 2021, his trilogy fight against Wilder was named Fight of the Year by The Ring. Fury was widely considered by media outlets to be the lineal heavyweight champion.

In February 2025, Sportico ranked Fury at No. 3 among the highest-paid athletes of 2024, with an estimated income of $147 million. In May 2025, Forbes put him at No. 3 in its ranking of the highest-paid athletes in the world, with his earnings being estimated at $146 million. As of July 2026, Fury is ranked as the world's fifth best active heavyweight by BoxRec, while The Ring ranks Fury as the fourth best heavyweight.

== Early life ==
Tyson Luke Fury was born on 12 August 1988 in the Wythenshawe area of Manchester, the son of Irish Traveller parents Amber and John Fury. He was born three months premature and weighed just 1 pound (450 g). His father named him after Mike Tyson, who was the reigning undisputed heavyweight world champion, and later explained, "The doctors told me there was not much chance of him living. I had lost two daughters in the same way who had been born prematurely." He decided on the name "Tyson" as Fury was "a fighter" and survived the premature birth.

Fury grew up in Styal, Cheshire, and later often mentioned his love for both Styal and his birthplace of Manchester. His paternal grandfather was from Tuam, which is also the birthplace of his father. The Furys are of Irish origin, deriving their present surname from Ó Fiodhabhra. His maternal grandmother is from County Tipperary and his mother was born in Belfast. Despite strongly identifying with his Irish heritage, Fury has had problems in gaining dual citizenship because his father's birth in County Galway was not recorded civilly in the 1960s, as Irish Travellers at the time only recorded births through baptism with the church rather than officially with the state. After defeating Wladimir Klitschko, Fury would quip that "becoming the heavyweight champion of the world is not as hard a fight as proving [one’s] Irishness".

Fury left school at the age of 11, and joined his father and three brothers tarmacking roads. His mother Amber had 14 pregnancies but only four of the children survived. A daughter, Ramona, was born in December 1997 but died within days. This experience has stayed with Fury, who was nine years old at the time. Fury began boxing at the age of 10. His father, John, trained him until 2011, when he was jailed for gouging out the eye of another Traveller due to a long-standing feud. Fury's uncle Hughie Fury trained him until he died in 2014, after which Fury's other uncle Peter Fury (trainer of son Hughie Fury) trained him in preparation for his fight against Klitschko.

The Fury family has a long history in boxing. Fury's father competed in the 1980s as "Gypsy" John Fury, initially as a bare-knuckle and unlicensed boxer, and then as a professional boxer. John had a professional record of 8–4–1, with one of his losses being to future WBO heavyweight world champion Henry Akinwande. Tyson's half-brother Tommy made his professional debut on 22 December 2018 under the tutelage of two-weight world champion Ricky Hatton. Fury is also a cousin of several professional boxers, including heavyweights Hughie Fury and Nathan Gorman, former WBO middleweight world champion Andy Lee and light heavyweight contender Hosea Burton. Fury's distant relatives include the bare-knuckle boxers Uriah Burton and Bartley Gorman, both considered "King of the Gypsies", hence Fury's own nickname of "Gypsy King". He has also styled himself as "The Furious One" and "2 Fast" Fury.

== Amateur career ==
As an amateur, Fury represented both England and Ireland. Fury represented Ireland three times at international level. He was based out of the Holy Family Boxing Club in Belfast, Northern Ireland, and later switched to the Smithboro Club in County Monaghan, Ireland. In a double international match against an experienced Polish team in 2007, the Irish team lost 12–6 overall; Fury, however, was victorious in both his fights in Rzeszów and Białystok. In another Irish match against the US, Fury won his bout by knockout. He won bronze at the AIBA Youth World Boxing Championships in 2006.

In England, while representing Jimmy Egan's Boxing Academy in Wythenshawe, Manchester, he participated in the senior national championships in 2006 but was beaten by David Price 22–8. In May 2007, he won the EU Junior Championship, defeating Istvan Bernath in the final. In July 2007 he won silver at the European Junior Championship, losing to Maxim Babanin in the final.

As a junior, Fury was ranked number three in the world behind the Russians Maxim Babanin and Andrey Volkov, but did not get the chance to represent Great Britain at the 2008 Olympics because each country is restricted to one boxer per weight division and David Price was selected. Price came up through the amateur Olympic programme. Fury also unsuccessfully tried to qualify for Ireland. Speaking in 2011, Fury said "I should have gone to the Olympic games in 2008 and won a gold medal for Ireland, but I was denied the chance to go and do it". He was also forced to withdraw from the Irish national championships after officials from the Holy Trinity Boxing Club in West Belfast, the club of the then Irish amateur heavyweight champion, submitted a protest regarding his eligibility as he was not born in Ireland.

Fury won the ABA super-heavyweight title in 2008 by defeating Damien Campbell 19:1. He turned professional later that year. Feeling disillusioned with amateur boxing, he decided not to wait for the 2012 Olympics. He finished with an amateur record of 31–4 (26 KOs).

== Professional career ==
=== Early career ===
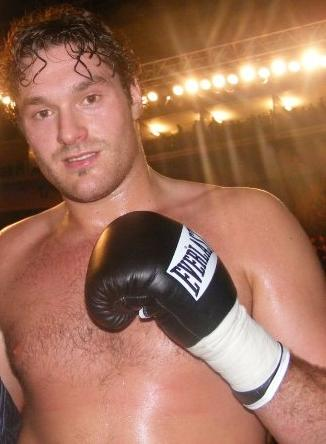
Fury after his professional debut, 2008

Fury made his professional debut at the age of 20 on 6 December 2008 in Nottingham, on the undercard of Carl Froch vs. Jean Pascal against Hungarian fighter Bela Gyongyosi (3–9–2), who Fury defeated via TKO in the first round with a combination to head and body. He then had six more fights in the space of seven months, defeating Marcel Zeller (21–3), Daniil Peretyatko (15–20), Lee Swaby (23–22–2), Matthew Ellis (20–6–1), Scott Belshaw (10–1) and Aleksandrs Selezens (3–6) all via knockout within 4 rounds.

On 11 September 2009, Fury fought John McDermott (25–5, 16 KOs) for the English heavyweight title, and won via a points decision. Fury came in as a 1–6 favourite but produced a poor display, and the 98–92 decision by the referee Terry O'Connor was criticised as a "travesty". The decision led the British Boxing Board of Control to mandate three judges for all English titles, and the board ordered a rematch.

Fury scored two more victories against Tomas Mrazek (4–22–5) and Hans-Joerg Blasko (9–3) before facing McDermott in a rematch on 25 June 2010. Fury settled the controversy of the first fight, as he knocked down McDermott three times, first in the 8th round then twice in the 9th round to win by TKO. Fury won the English heavyweight title for a second time in the process. Another three wins followed: points decisions over American fighters Rich Power (12–0) and Zack Page (21–32–2) in two 8-round matches, and a knockout of the Brazilian Marcelo Nascimento (13–0) in the 5th round.

=== British and Commonwealth champion ===
==== Fury vs. Chisora ====
On 23 July 2011, Fury faced undefeated heavyweight Derek Chisora for the British and Commonwealth heavyweight titles at Wembley Arena in London. Although Chisora was aged 27 and Fury 22 years old, both men went into the fight with a record of 14–0. Despite Fury's superior size and reach, Chisora was the favourite. After 12 hard-fought rounds Fury won via unanimous decision 117–112, 117–112, and 118–111, with the fight shown live on free-to-air Channel 5. Promoter Mick Hennessy said the fight peaked at around 3 million viewers.

==== Miscellaneous fights ====
On 17 September 2011, Fury fought 32-year-old fringe contender Nicolai Firtha (20–8–1, 8 KOs) in a non-title bout at the King's Hall, Belfast. Firtha took the fight on two weeks' notice. The opening two rounds were dominated by Fury. In round 3, Firtha landed a big punch which looked to trouble Fury. Fury regained control of the fight by the next round and forced the referee to stop the fight at 2 minutes, 19 seconds on round 5. Fury admitted he got caught flush, "He caught me with a good punch and I had to come back from it." The fight averaged 1.03 million viewers on Channel 5.

Fury returned to the ring on 12 November at the Event City in Trafford Park, Manchester to defend his Commonwealth heavyweight title against undefeated Canadian heavyweight champion Neven Pajkic (16–0, 5 KOs). Fury had an early scare after being knocked down in round 2 following a big right hand. Although Pajkic hobbled Fury again at the outset of round 3, Fury came back to knock down Pajkic twice during that round. The referee stopped the fight after the last knockdown, causing Pajkic to protest, who declared himself ready to fight on. Many at ringside thought the stoppage premature. The fight averaged 1.72 million viewers on Channel 5.

Fury vacated his British and Commonwealth belts in order to pursue a future world title match. He said to the media of his decision to vacate the belts, "I vacated the British and Commonwealth titles, which some people say are more prestigious than the Irish title, but not to me. I vacated those belts for an Irish title shot because it meant more to me. All my people are from Ireland. I was born in Manchester but I am Irish." On 14 April 2012, Fury travelled to Belfast to fight at the Odyssey Arena for the vacant Irish heavyweight title. His opponent was veteran Martin Rogan (14–2, 7 KOs). Rogan had not fought in 18 months and had not beaten an opponent with a winning record since 2009. At 245 3/4 pounds (111.5 kg), Fury was fighting at the lightest weight of his professional career to date. Fury put Rogan on the canvas with a left hook in the third round. Rogan went down again in round 5 from a body shot. Rogan made it to his feet, but the bout was stopped at the request of his corner. The fight averaged 1.33 million viewers on Channel 5.

On 7 July, Fury fought for the vacant WBO Inter-Continental heavyweight title against American boxer Vinny Maddalone (35–7, 26 KOs) at the Hand Arena in Clevedon, Somerset. Fury weighed 245.5 pounds (111.4 kg), marginally lighter than the Rogan fight. Maddalone entered with a record of 4–3 in his previous seven bouts. Fury improved his record to 19–0 with 14 stoppage wins, with a fifth-round technical knockout over Maddalone. Fury controlled the fight from the onset and stunned Maddalone with a combination in the opening round. Fury continued to land heavy punches and opened a cut under his opponent's left eye in the fourth. In round 5, with Maddalone taking punches, the referee stepped in and called an end to the bout with blood streaming out of the cut under the veteran's left eye. It was the fifth knockout loss of Maddalone's professional career. In the post-fight interviews, Fury said, "I knew it was a matter of time. I actually called the referee over, he was taking some big shots. I'm still undefeated. I would like to say I'm ready for anyone in the world. Klitschkos, bring them on. Americans, bring them on. Bring on Tomasz Adamek. He's too small for me and I see an early win for me." Promoter Mick Hennessy also stated a world title fight was "two or three fights away", targeting Adamek next. The fight averaged 1.05 million viewers on Channel 5.

=== Rise up the ranks ===
==== Fury vs. Johnson ====
On 12 November 2012, it was announced that Fury would fight American world title contender Kevin Johnson (28–3–1, 13 KOs) in a WBC title eliminator at the Odyssey Arena in Belfast on 1 December. Fury said, "Johnson is just the kind of opponent that I want at this stage of my career. We needed a world class fighter and we have got one." Fury won via unanimous decision over Johnson. After 12 rounds, the judges scored it 119–110, 119–108, and 119–108 in favour of Fury. Many media outlets including the BBC and ESPN dubbed the fight as a poor showing. Fury claimed he would score a good win, just as rival David Price did when he stopped Matt Skelton a night earlier, but instead eased to a decision victory. Fury, with the win, was in line to challenge for the WBC title, held at the time by Vitali Klitschko. The fight averaged 1.37 million viewers on Channel 5.

==== Fury vs. Cunningham ====
On 20 February 2013, it was reported that Fury would fight highly ranked American former cruiserweight world champion Steve Cunningham (25–5, 12 KOs) in his United States debut at Madison Square Garden Theater on 20 April. The bout was an IBF title eliminator to determine the number 2 world ranking, with the winner then needing to fight unbeaten Bulgarian heavyweight Kubrat Pulev for the mandatory position for a shot at the long reigning world champion Wladimir Klitschko. Cunningham came into the fight on the rebound from a controversial split decision loss to Tomasz Adamek. At the weigh in, Cunningham was 44 pounds (20 kg) lighter, at 210 pounds (95 kg) to Fury's 254 pounds (115 kg).

Fury fought wildly in the first two rounds of the bout, and was floored heavily by Cunningham in the 2nd round. Cunningham continued to land heavy punches on Fury for the next few rounds, until being worn down by Fury's size advantage and power punches. By round seven, Fury had fully rebounded and handed Cunningham the first knockout defeat of his career with a cuffing right hand against the rope. Earlier, in round five, Fury was docked a point following a headbutt. At the time of the stoppage, Fury was behind on two judges' scorecards 57–55, while the other judge had it 56–56 (even). A week after the fight, Cunningham spoke to ATG Radio, claiming that Fury used an illegal manoeuvre to knock him out, "He held me with his forearm. He pushed me in the corner twice – which is illegal – and then he pushed me with his forearm, cocked my head to the left and threw a right hook." The fight card aired on NBC in the late afternoon and averaged 1.2 million viewers, peaking at 1.7 million. In the UK, the fight aired on Channel 5 and averaged 1.54 million viewers. The win over Cunningham gave Fury a world ranking of 7 according to BoxRec, a number 2 ranking according to the IBF, 6th with the WBC, and 5th with the WBO.

Fury was due to fight David Haye (26–2, 24 KOs) on 28 September 2013, in a fight which would have seen Fury fight on a pay-per-view platform for the first time. However, Haye pulled out of the fight on 21 September, after sustaining a cut, which required six stitches, above the eye during training. The fight was originally postponed to 8 February 2014. Haye pulled out of the fight a second time on 17 November, stating that he had a career-threatening shoulder injury which required surgery, and hinted at his retirement. Fury believed that Haye was making excuses because he did not want the fight, saying "I'm absolutely furious but in all honesty this is exactly what I expected. Everyone knows I was very suspicious when he pulled out the first time and this confirms to me that he's always been afraid of me and never wanted this fight." Aside from training camp expenses, Haye also cost Fury his positions in the world rankings including an IBF final eliminator bout which would have made him mandatory for a shot at the world title.

Fury announced his retirement on 20 November 2013, stating on social media "I have officially retired from boxing. There's [sic] too many bent people in the sport. They will have to ffuck someone else. Goodbye boxing." He confirmed his decision the next day, stating "Just to confirm I'm not in a bad mood or anything. I've retired 1000000% no matter what ill never fight again!".

==== Fury vs. Abell ====
On 24 January 2014, it was announced that Fury would fight at the Copper Box Arena against Argentine veteran Gonzalo Omar Basile (61–8, 27 KOs) on 15 February. On 5 February, Basile pulled out of the fight due to a lung infection. He was replaced by American journeyman Joey Abell (29–7, 28 KOs). Fury won the fight via 4th-round TKO, which set up a rematch with Chisora in the summer. Ring rust showed in the opening two rounds with Abell connecting with left hands, which had Fury against the ropes. But Fury managed to compose himself and get behind the jab. In the third round, Fury floored Abell with a right hand. Abell beat the count but was floored again, this time being saved by the bell. Two more knockdowns followed in round 4 ending the fight. After the fight, Fury took to the microphone, "Tyson too fast Fury, that's the name, fighting's the game and these are bums compared to me. I want Wladimir Klitschko, he's avoiding me, let's get it on Wlad."

=== European champion ===
==== Fury vs. Chisora II ====
Fury was due to fight rival and heavyweight contender Derek Chisora for the second time on 26 July 2014, for the European and once again the British heavyweight title. On 21 July, Chisora was forced to pull out after sustaining a fractured hand in training. Russian Alexander Ustinov was lined up as Chisora's replacement in the bout scheduled to take place at the Manchester Arena, Fury pulled out of the fight after his uncle and former trainer Hughie Fury was taken seriously ill. However, Fury and Chisora rescheduled the rematch for 29 November 2014 at ExCeL London. The bout was also a WBO title eliminator and shown live on BoxNation. Fury was victorious again after dominating the fight up until Chisora's corner pulled him out at the end of the 10th round. Fury also used a southpaw stance for the majority of the fight, despite the traditional right-handed orthodox stance being his preference. Fury used his jab to trouble Chisora and stayed on the outside with his longer reach to dominate the fight. Chisora failed to land any telling punches, and due to Fury's awkward fighting style, ended up hitting him below the belt. Chisora was warned by referee Marcus McDonnell in the first round. After the fight, Fury said, "Wladimir Klitschko, I'm coming for you, baby. I'm coming. No retreat, no surrender." Promoter Mick Hennessy said Fury would likely fight once more before challenging for the world title.

==== Fury vs. Hammer ====
On 26 December 2014, Sky Sports News announced that Fury would fight once more before challenging Klitschko for his world titles. His opponent was Christian Hammer (17–3, 10 KOs) and the fight took place on 28 February 2015 at the O2 Arena in London. Fury said he went for an opponent that would give him a challenge rather than an "easier" opponent, before challenging Klitschko. Fury went on to win the fight when it came to a halt in the 8th round via corner stoppage. Fury dominated the fight from the opening bell and dropped Hammer in round 5 with a short right hook. After the fight, Fury called out Wladimir Klitschko again, stating he was ready for his world title shot.

=== Unified heavyweight world champion ===
==== Fury vs. Klitschko ====
In July 2015, it was confirmed that Fury would fight Wladimir Klitschko in a world heavyweight title showdown, for the WBA (Super), IBF, WBO, IBO, and The Ring heavyweight titles. Initially scheduled for 24 October 2015, the fight was postponed to 28 November 2015 after Klitschko sustained a calf injury. For this match, Fury trained with the highest ranked heavyweight kickboxers in GLORY, Rico Verhoeven and Benjamin Adegbuyi.

The fight took place at Esprit Arena in Düsseldorf, Germany. On fight night, there was controversy with the gloves, then a complaint about the ring canvas. Klitschko reportedly had his hands wrapped without the presence of a Fury representative, so had to do them again. Fury won after 12 rounds by a unanimous decision. The judges scored the fight 115–112, 115–112, and 116–111. Klitschko and Fury showed little offence during the 12 rounds, but Fury was more active and did enough each round to take the decision. Klitschko landed 52 of 231 punches thrown (23%) and Fury landed 86 of 371 thrown (23%).

In the post-fight interview, an emotional Fury said, "This is a dream come true. We worked so hard for this. I've done it. It's hard to come to foreign countries and get decisions. It just means so much to me to come here and get the decision." He then took the microphone and thanked Klitschko, "I'd like to say to Wladimir, you're a great champion. And thanks very much for having me. It was all fun and games during the buildup." Klitschko failed to throw his well-known right hand, mostly due to Fury's constant movement and mocking. He said, "Tyson was the faster and better man tonight. I felt quite comfortable in the first six rounds, but I was astonished that Tyson was so fast in the second half as well. I couldn't throw my right hand because the advantage was the longer distance he had." Klitschko had a rematch clause in place.

On 8 December 2015, the IBF stripped Fury of its title, as the contract for the fight against Klitschko included a rematch clause, precluding Fury from facing the IBF's mandatory challenger Vyacheslav Glazkov. Fury had held the IBF belt for only 10 days.

=== Relinquishing world titles ===
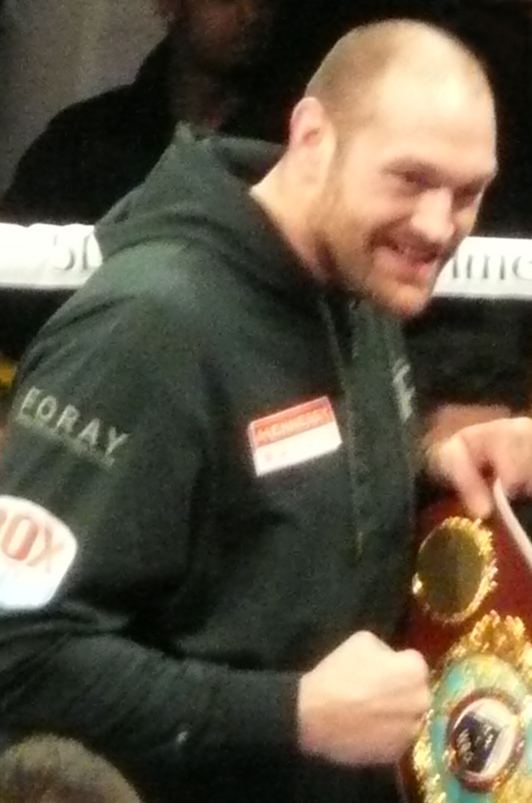
Fury in 2016

Following months of negotiation, the rematch with Klitschko was announced on 8 April 2016, this time with the fight scheduled to take place in Fury's hometown of Manchester at the Manchester Arena on 9 July 2016. Despite agreeing terms for the rematch, Fury said he had "no motivation" and had gained an extreme amount of weight after the first fight, as he weighed over 24 stone (330 lb or 150 kg) by April 2016. On 24 June 2016, it was announced that this fight would be postponed to a later date due to Fury sustaining a sprained ankle in training. On the same day, Fury and his cousin, Hughie Fury, were charged by UK Anti-Doping "with presence of a prohibited substance", namely nandrolone, from a sample taken 16 months previously in February 2015. Tyson and Hughie said that they "strenuously deny" the charge. On 23 September, Fury again postponed the fight after being declared "medically unfit". ESPN reported that Fury had failed a drug test for cocaine a day before the second postponement. Fury cited problems with depression after the positive test for cocaine.

Fury's mental health deteriorated after winning the world titles. On 3 October 2016, Fury announced his retirement from boxing for the second time, although he walked this back a few hours later. On 4 October 2016, in an interview with Rolling Stone, Fury said "I'm going through a lot of personal demons, trying to shake them off, this has got nothing to do with my fighting – what I'm going through right now is my personal life. I've not been in a gym for months. I've been going through depression. I just don't want to live anymore, if you know what I'm saying. I've had total enough of it. Never mind cocaine. I just didn't care. I don't want to live anymore. So cocaine is a little minor thing compared to not wanting to live anymore. I am seeing help, but they can't do nothing for me. What I've got is incurable. I don't want to live. All the money in the world, fame and glory, means nothing if you're not happy. I'm seeing psychiatrists. They say I've got a version of bipolar. I'm a manic depressive. I don't even want to wake up. I hope I die every day. And that's a bad thing to say when I've got three children and a lovely wife isn't it? But I don't want to live anymore. And if I could take me own life – and I wasn't a Christian – I'd take it in a second. I just hope someone kills me before I kill me self. I'll have to spend eternity in hell. I've been out drinking, Monday to Friday to Sunday, and taking cocaine. I can't deal with it and the only thing that helps me is when I get drunk out of me mind."

On 12 October 2016, pending investigation on an anti-doping case about his cocaine use, nandrolone findings, and being deemed medically unfit to fight, Fury decided to vacate the WBA (Unified), WBO, IBO heavyweight titles. He said "I won the titles in the ring and I believe that they should be lost in the ring, but I'm unable to defend at this time and I have taken the hard and emotional decision to now officially vacate my treasured world titles and wish the next in-line contenders all the very best as I now enter another big challenge in my life which I know, like against Klitschko, I will conquer." Fury's promoter Mick Hennessy added: "Tyson will still be the lineal world heavyweight champion in everyone's eyes. He beat the most dominant champion in the modern era of boxing on an amazing night in Germany to earn that accolade and that will never change. Whilst it's heartbreaking to see Tyson vacate the world titles that he worked so long and hard for all his life, what's paramount now is that he receives the medical treatment along with the love of his family and friends and the support of the boxing world to make a full recovery." Fury's decision was based on not having to put himself under constant media pressure, allowing him time to recover and receive professional medical help for his mental health problems, and spend time with his family. On 13 October, the British Boxing Board of Control decided to suspend Fury's boxing licence. On 1 February 2018, Fury was stripped of his last remaining title, The Ring magazine's heavyweight championship.

=== Issues with UKAD and BBBofC ===
In December 2016, Fury's uncle Peter announced that Fury would be returning around spring in 2017 and would aim for a fight against WBC champion Deontay Wilder. On 23 December, Fury tweeted that he was back in training ahead of a ring return around April or May 2017. His tweet read, "I've had a nightmare 2016, done a lot of stuff I'm not proud of, but my promise to you is I'll return in 2017." On 6 March 2017, Fury tweeted that his return fight would take place on 13 May 2017 and he was speaking to promoter Frank Warren about possible opponents. Warren had become Fury's promoter after Fury dropped his long-time promoter Mick Hennessy. The date set for the return would mean Fury would be fighting on the undercard of Josh Warrington defending his WBC International featherweight title against Kiko Martinez at the First Direct Arena in Leeds.

Shortly after Fury announced a comeback date, the British Boxing Board of Control (BBBofC) publicly announced that Fury was still suspended and would not be fighting in May. This was confirmed by their general secretary Robert Smith. He also mentioned that there had been no contact from Fury or his representatives since the ban started in October 2016. Warren told Reuters on 7 March, "I want to see him back in the ring as soon as possible but before that happens he's got a couple of issues to sort out." Warren said that along with the dispute with the BBBofC there would need to be a court hearing with UK Anti-Doping (UKAD).

Robert Smith, general secretary of the BBBofC, said in May 2017 that Fury's case was "complex" and it had been adjourned. In August 2017, Fury announced his retirement from boxing for the third time. Nevertheless, in September 2017, Fury challenged UKAD to give him a reply, and either ban him or reinstate his boxing licence. He believed he was being treated unfairly as it had taken over a year for them to reply, stating that usually the problem would be dealt with within a matter of months. Fury tweeted, "How long must I be held up and kept out of action? It's been 15 months since I've been under investigation, you're keeping an innocent man from fulfilling his destiny and from providing for his family." UKAD stated there was no particular timescale involved, but denied claims that they were prolonging the hearing. Instead they said they were trying to resolve the matter as soon as possible.

On 8 November 2017, BBC Sport reported that a National Anti-Doping Panel hearing was due to take place in December. Due to the legal battle between Fury and UKAD, it was believed that UKAD could potentially become insolvent or would need a government bail out. UKAD reportedly have an annual budget of £8 million, and the fact that Fury had not fought for two years would have caused potential loss of earnings, possibly over £10 million. UKAD asked the government if they could underwrite the case. On 23 November, according to Robert Smith of the BBBofC, a hearing was set for a date in December 2017. On 25 November 2017, Fury announced his comeback after signing with managerial group MTK Global. A hearing start date of 11 December was set, with a potential outcome being Fury facing a four-year ban. Fury did not attend the hearing and had reporters waiting outside the location for six hours before leaving. Mick Hennessy later stated that Fury was not required at the hearing. On 7 February 2018, UKAD revealed they spent £585,659 on the Fury case. £576,587 was paid to London law firm Bird & Bird, barrister fees came to £1,130 and around £8,000 was paid for laboratory work. UKAD believed they could regain £250,000 through legal insurance.

On 12 December, UKAD announced they had agreed with the Furys and the BBBoC to resolve the charges. "Taking into account the delays in results management that meant charges were not brought in respect of the nandrolone findings until June 2016, and the provisional suspensions that Tyson and Hughie Fury have already effectively served, the two year period of ineligibility is backdated to 13 December 2015, and therefore expires at midnight on 12 December 2017." Tyson's February 2015 win over Christian Hammer was disqualified but his Klitschko triumph was not. Tyson blamed the elevated nandrolone levels on eating uncastrated wild boar and declared his and Hughie's innocence, "Hughie and I have maintained our innocence from day one and we're now happy that it has finally been settled with UKAD and that we can move forward knowing that we'll not be labelled drug cheats." The BBBofC said they would consider the renewal of Fury's boxing licence in January 2018. In relation to the news, Fury wrote on Twitter, "Guess who's back?"

=== Return to the ring ===
On 10 January 2018, Fury announced he would be re-applying for his boxing licence through the BBBofC. An interview took place between Fury and BBBofC on 19 January, where the latter agreed to re-instate Fury as long as he sent them up-to-date medical records after visiting a psychologist. Fury said a motivation on his return was Deontay Wilder. "He said I couldn't do it, he said definitely not Tyson Fury. He's done." At a press conference in London on 12 April 2018, Fury announced he had signed a multi-fight deal with Frank Warren's Queensberry Promotions. He stated that he intended to fight at least three times before 2019, starting on 9 June at the Manchester Arena. After weeks of speculation, it was confirmed the fight would be shown exclusively on BT Sport.

==== Fury vs. Seferi ====
On 20 May 39-year-old Albanian Sefer Seferi (23–1, 21 KOs) was announced as Fury's opponent in a 10-round bout. Seferi was a career cruiserweight, having fought once at heavyweight, when he lost to Manuel Charr in 2016. Fury weighed 276 pounds (125 kg) at the weigh-in, 66 pounds (30 kg) heavier than Seferi. Fury had lost 112 pounds (51 kg) for the fight, having experienced extreme weight gain due to his mental health problems. Fury won the fight after Seferi quit on his stool after round 4. The opening couple of rounds had little to no action as Fury was showboating, which referee Phil Edwards warned him for in round 2. A brawl also broke out in the crowd during the fight, but order was restored before the fight came to an end. Fury began to unload heavy shots in round 4 and it appeared many of the shots landed and hurt Seferi, hence he retired on his stool. After the fight, Warren confirmed Fury would next return on the Carl Frampton undercard on 18 August at Windsor Park in Belfast. It was revealed the fight, which aired exclusively on BT Sport 1, peaked at 814,000 live viewers.

==== Fury vs. Pianeta ====
On 12 July 2018, it was announced that Fury would fight former two-time world title challenger Francesco Pianeta (35–4–1, 21 KOs) on 18 August. Fury weighed in at 258 pounds (117 kg), 18 pounds (8.2 kg) lighter than he weighed against Seferi. Pianeta came in at 254.7 pounds (115.5 kg). On 30 July, it was reported that there was ongoing negotiations for a fight to take place in either November or December 2018 between Fury and Wilder (40–0, 39 KOs). On 31 July, Fury stated the fight against Wilder was 99% a done deal, with only a location and date to be confirmed. Fury also had to come through in his bout against Pianeta. Wilder was scheduled to be in Belfast to further promote the fight. Fury went the full 10 rounds, defeating Pianeta via a points decision. Referee Steve Gray scored the fight 100–90 in favour of Fury.

Fury later stated he had no intention of trying to end the fight early. He said, "I think it was a calculated boxing performance. I got 10 rounds with a very tough man under my belt. I was working on my jab, slipping his punches. I thought that was a step up with the opponent and display. I needed the rounds, and I had plenty left in the tank." According to CompuBox, Fury landed 107 of 620 punches thrown (17%). This included 100 power punches landed of 226 thrown (44%). Pianeta landed only 37 of his 228 punches thrown (16%).

During the post-fight interviews, promoter Warren confirmed the Fury vs. Wilder fight was on. The fight would take place in either Las Vegas or New York in November 2018. The fight would be aired on PPV in the United States on Showtime and in the UK on BT Sports Box Office. Talking about how the fight came together, Fury said, "We have two men who will fight anyone. This man has been trying to make a fight with another chump. They called, I answered. I said: 'Send me the contract.' They sent it. I said 'yes'." Warren later told BBC Radio 5 live, "[It's a] 50–50 [purse split], quick and smooth negotiations. He was the world heavyweight champion. He's undefeated. [Wilder and his team] understand that. All of the terms are agreed." By the end of August, contracts for the fight to take place had been signed.

=== WBC heavyweight title challenge ===
==== Fury vs. Wilder ====
On 22 September, both Fury and Wilder confirmed they had signed the contract and the fight would take place on 1 December 2018. According to the California State Athletic Commission, Wilder would earn a guaranteed base purse of $4 million and Fury would take home a guaranteed purse of $3 million. Despite Frank Warren's original claim that the revenue would be split 50–50, it was revealed that Wilder could make $14 million (£11 million) and Fury would earn around $10.25 million (£8 million). Both boxers would see this increase to their base purses after receiving their percentages from pay-per-view revenue. The weigh-in took place on 30 November, outside the Los Angeles Convention Center. Fury stepped on the scale first and weighed in at 256 1/2 pounds (116.3 kg). This was only 2 pounds (0.91 kg) lighter than his weigh-in against Francisco Pianeta in August 2018, but he looked leaner. Wilder was next to step on and came in at 212 1/2 pounds (96.4 kg), his lowest since his debut in 2008 when he weighed 207 1/4 pounds (94.0 kg). For his last bout, Wilder weighed 214 pounds (97 kg), however, it was cited that Wilder became ill during his training camp.

In front of a crowd of 17,698 at the Staples Center, Wilder and Fury fought a 12-round split decision draw, meaning Wilder retained his WBC title. Mexican judge Alejandro Rochin scored the fight 115–111 for Wilder, Canadian judge Robert Tapper had it 114–112 for Fury and English judge Phil Edwards scored it a 113–113 draw. The crowd booed at the decision with many believing Fury did enough to dethrone Wilder. Fury, using his unorthodox stance, spent much of the fight using upper and lower-body movement to avoid Wilder big shots and stay out of range. There was not much action in round 1 as both boxers used the round to feel each other out. Wilder tried to trap Fury into the corner, but Fury made Wilder miss most of his big swings. In round 4, Wilder bloodied Fury's nose with his stiff jabs, but was unable to follow up on the attacks. In round 6, Fury switched to southpaw stance and had success backing Wilder against the ropes and at the same time stayed cautious of Wilder's power. In round 7, after trading jabs, which saw Fury come out on top, Fury landed a counter right hand, then quickly tied Wilder up before he could throw anything back. Round 8 saw back and forth action with both trying to land. Wilder threw a lot of power shots which Fury mostly evaded. In round 9, Wilder finally dropped Fury with a short left hook followed by an overhand right. Fury beat referee Jack Reiss' count and survived the round. Having expended a lot of energy trying to finish Fury in round 9, Wilder looked fatigued in round 10. This came to as an advantage for Fury as he landed two right hands. Fury also took advantage in round 11, landing enough shots and avoided anything Wilder could throw. In round 12, Wilder landed a right-left combination which put Fury down hard on his back. The crowd, commentary team and Wilder believed the fight was over. Reiss looked at Fury on the canvas and began giving him a count. To everyone's surprise, Fury beat the count. Reiss made Fury walk towards him and called for the action to continue. Wilder, fatigued again, was unable to land another power shot and Fury landed some right hands to finish the round and the fight on his feet. Both boxers embraced in a hug after the final bell sounded.

According to CompuBox statistics, Wilder landed 71 punches of 430 thrown (17%), and Fury landed 84 of his 327 thrown (26%). Wilder was much less accurate in this fight than he usually had been in previous fights. Fury out-landed Wilder in 9 out of the 12 rounds. Both Wilder and Fury only landed double digits in 4 separate rounds. After the fight, both men gave in-ring interviews. Wilder stated, "I think with the two knockdowns, I definitely won the fight. We poured our hearts out tonight. We're both warriors. I rushed my punches. I didn't sit still. I was too hesitant. I started overthrowing the right hand, and I just couldn't adjust. I was rushing my punches. That's something I usually don't do." Fury said, "We're on away soil. I got knocked down twice, but I still believe I won that fight. I'm being a total professional here. God bless America. The 'Gypsy King' has returned. That man is a fearsome puncher, and I was able to avoid that. The world knows I won the fight. I hope I did you all proud after nearly three years out of the ring. I showed good heart to get up. I came here tonight, and I fought my heart out." Wilder and Fury both claimed to be the best heavyweights in the world and both called out unified world champion Anthony Joshua. Fury shouted, "Chicken! Chicken! Joshua, where are you?" Wilder then agreed to state the two best heavyweights got into the ring and fought.

The event was both a critical and a commercial success. The fight sold approximately 325,000 pay-per-view buys on Showtime in the United States, grossing around $24 million, making it the most lucrative heavyweight fight in the country since 2003. Showtime's delayed broadcast a week later drew an average 488,000 viewers and peaked at 590,000 viewers. Despite the commercial success of the fight, promoter Bob Arum believes it was meagre in comparison to the bout's potential. Arum said Fury vs. Wilder II could surpass Floyd Mayweather Jr. vs. Manny Pacquiao, which grossed over $600 million, saying: "They were the little guys, here we have the biggest men in the sport."

=== Establishing himself in Las Vegas ===
==== Fury vs. Schwarz ====
After the fight with Wilder, Fury secured a five-fight contract with ESPN and Top Rank worth £80 million ($100 million). He made his return to the ring at the MGM Grand Garden Arena in Las Vegas against the WBO Inter-Continental heavyweight champion Tom Schwarz (24–0, 16 KOs) on 15 June 2019. This was Fury's first fight in Las Vegas. Schwarz was ranked No. 2 by the WBO and #9 by the IBF at the time. Fury weighed 263 pounds (119 kg), compared to Schwarz's 235 1/2 pounds (106.8 kg). Fury was in complete control of the fight, peppering the undefeated Schwarz in round one before finishing him in the second round by TKO, to take Schwarz's WBO Inter-Continental title. During the fight, Fury purposely backed up against the ropes and let Schwarz unload, using head movement to evade the strikes and generating applause from the 9,000 people in attendance.

==== Fury vs. Wallin ====
Fury fought again in Las Vegas against former WBA Continental heavyweight champion Otto Wallin (20–0, 13 KOs) on 14 September, at the T-Mobile Arena. Promoter Frank Warren said: "It is another undefeated boxer he is facing and a contest where a victory will set up the Deontay Wilder rematch." Wallin was ranked No. 4 by the WBA and #12 by the IBF at heavyweight. Fury scaled at 254.4 pounds (115.4 kg), his lightest since facing Klitschko in 2015, when he weighed 247 pounds (112 kg). The Swedish southpaw Wallin came in at exactly 236 pounds (107 kg).

Fury won by unanimous decision 116–112, 117–111, and 118–110. Fury suffered a serious cut above his right eye in the third round from a short left hook, as well as a cut over his right eyelid from an accidental clash of heads in the fifth which affected his vision for the rest of the fight and prompted a ringside doctor to be consulted in the sixth. After an examination, Fury said he was able to continue and the doctor agreed. In the second half of the fight, Fury repeatedly hit Wallin with solid shots. Wallin came back in the twelfth with his best punch of the fight, a clean left hand which momentarily troubled Fury. After tying Wallin up in a clinch, Fury saw out the round, receiving the decision victory and the WBC Mayan belt, a commemorative title awarded to the winner of a high-profile fight held during Mexican national holidays.

According to CompuBox, Fury landed 179 of 651 total punches (27%) while Wallin connected with 127 of 334 total punches (38%). Of these total punches, Fury landed 127 power punches to Wallin's 84. In his in-ring interview, Fury praised the performance of Wallin, who was a more than 10–1 underdog, and expressed condolences as Wallin's father had recently died. Fury then called out Wilder for a rematch in February 2020.

=== WBC and The Ring heavyweight champion ===
==== Fury vs. Wilder II ====
On 27 November 2019, ESPN announced that Fury would face Deontay Wilder on 22 February 2020, in a rematch of their bout in 2018, which resulted in a controversial draw. In the build-up to the rematch, Fury split with trainer Ben Davison, who had coached Fury since late 2017 and helped him lose the large amount of weight he had gained during his hiatus and restore him to fighting condition. Davison was nominated for 2018 Trainer of the Year due to his role in Fury's successful return to the ring. The split was described as amicable and Davison wished Fury good luck in the rematch against Wilder. Fury then announced he had partnered with SugarHill Steward, nephew of Hall-of-Fame trainer Emanuel Steward, and that he would return to Kronk Gym, where he briefly trained in 2010. The rematch was officially announced on 27 December 2019, and the venue was set as the MGM Grand Garden Arena in Las Vegas. The fight contract included a clause in which the loser can invoke a trilogy fight if he chooses.

Fury weighed in at 273 pounds (124 kg), the third heaviest weight of his professional career and 17 pounds (7.7 kg) heavier than his weight for the first Wilder bout. He stated in the lead-up to the fight that he wanted extra size and power to look for a knockout. Wilder weighed in at 231 pounds (105 kg), the heaviest of his career. Fury started the fight by taking the centre of the ring and establishing his jab. He looked for some big shots, while evading Wilder's swings. In the third round, Fury floored Wilder with a strong right hand to the temple. Wilder beat the count and survived the round but was visibly disoriented, as blood began to stream from his left ear. Wilder fell to the canvas twice more, but they were ruled as slips by the referee Kenny Bayless, before Fury knocked Wilder down again in the fifth round with a quick combination punctuated by a left hook to the body. Wilder made it to his feet again, but was unable to muster much in the way of a counterattack and he was now bleeding from the mouth as well as the ear. The fight was stopped midway through the seventh round after a flurry of hard-hitting shots from Fury caused Wilder's corner to throw in the towel to save him from further punishment. At the time of stoppage, Fury was ahead on all three judges' scorecards 59–52, 58–53, and 59–52, with the irregular scores due to Bayless deducting a point from Fury in the fifth for holding.

According to CompuBox, Fury landed 82 of his 267 total punches (31%), including 58 out of 160 power punches (36%). Wilder landed 34 of his 141 total punches (24%), including 18 out of 55 power punches (33%). Fury received widespread praise for his performance, with many believing that it established one of the best boxing comeback stories ever seen, and some stating that the victory placed him as one of the greatest heavyweight boxers in history. It made him the first man to defeat two champions who had 10 or more defences of their world championship (Klitschko with 18 defences, and Wilder with 10 defences). Fury also became the third heavyweight, after Muhammad Ali and Floyd Patterson, to hold The Ring magazine title twice, and the first heavyweight in history to have held the WBA (Super), WBC, IBF, WBO, and The Ring magazine titles. With a gate of $16,916,440, the fight broke the gate record for a heavyweight bout in Nevada set by Evander Holyfield vs. Lennox Lewis II in November 1999.

==== Fury vs. Wilder III ====
Deontay Wilder activated the clause for a second rematch fight with Tyson Fury after his loss to Fury in the first rematch. The trilogy fight was tentatively scheduled for July 2020, but this was later postponed due to the COVID-19 pandemic. On 11 June 2020, Anthony Joshua's promoter Eddie Hearn announced that Fury and Joshua had agreed a two-fight deal, provided that Fury defeated Wilder and Joshua defeated his mandatory challenger, Kubrat Pulev. Fury's promoter Bob Arum said in August 2020, "the WBC approved the trilogy contract and that provides for postponements. And certainly, if you can't do it with spectators, a reasonable postponement would be okay. It's a different kind of fight."

On 12 October 2020, Fury announced that he was foregoing a trilogy fight with Wilder after organizers failed to deliver a date for the event in 2020. The Athletic reported "Fury had every intention of fighting Wilder in 2020 and made several concessions regarding rescheduled dates. However, he was unwilling to allow this situation to drag out, delaying a series of fights with Joshua while also keeping him out of the ring for an extended period of time."

On 17 May 2021, the proposed unification fight between Fury and Joshua was thrown into serious doubt when arbitration judge Daniel Weinstein ruled that Fury will have to honour a contractual clause which mandates a third fight with Wilder. Subsequently, Bob Arum claimed that the Allegiant Stadium in Las Vegas had been reserved for 24 July in anticipation of Fury's trilogy fight with Wilder. On 22 May 2021, Fury announced during the broadcast of José Ramírez vs. Josh Taylor on ESPN that he had signed the contract for the Wilder trilogy fight, which ESPN showed footage of Fury signing. It was also confirmed by Wilder's manager Shelly Finkel that his fighter had signed the contract, and that the fight was on. Ahead of their pre-fight press conference on 15 June, the venue was officially confirmed as T-Mobile Arena in Las Vegas, where Fury had previously defeated Otto Wallin by unanimous decision on 14 September 2019. The bout was postponed from the original date of 24 July until 9 October, after Fury's camp had an outbreak of COVID-19. At the pre-fight weigh-in on 8 October, both men weighed in at their respective career-heaviest weights, with the champion Fury weighing in at 277 lbs (19 st 11 lb), and the challenger Wilder at 238 lbs (17 st).

On the night, both men exchanged a total of five knockdowns as Fury won the bout via eleventh-round knockout. Wilder had started the first round well, jabbing the champion to the body and landing several clean right hands to his chest and stomach, doing enough to win the first round on all three judges' scorecards. In the second, Fury landed some good shots in the clinch. Midway through the third, Fury sent Wilder to the canvas with a series of hard right hands, and continued to pummel him as Wilder was effectively saved by the bell. Wilder came back in the fourth with a vicious short right hand that put Fury down on the canvas. Wilder continued coming forwards, and sent the champion down again towards the end of the round. In the middle rounds, Fury recovered and started landing with more regularity, racking up a commanding lead on the cards and marking up Wilder's face badly, with the latter now visibly exhausted as a result of all of the punishment he had taken. In the tenth, Wilder was decked by a huge right hook, but came back yet again with a huge series of wild swings that caught Fury at the bell. With Wilder badly hurt and bleeding, Fury managed to finish his opponent in the eleventh round with a clean right hook thrown from the clinch. Referee Robert Mora waved the contest off with Wilder face-down on the canvas. After the fight, Fury praised his opponent, calling Wilder a "top fighter", but criticised him for being a "sore loser" and refusing to "show any sportsmanship or respect". In his post-fight interview, Fury stated "I'm a sportsman. I went over to him to show some love and respect and he didn't show it back. I will pray for him so that God will soften his heart." Fury then added that it "was a great fight tonight, worthy of the best of trilogies." Fury asserted his view that he is the best boxer in his division, stating "I'm now the greatest heavyweight of my era, without a doubt."

At the time of the stoppage, Fury was winning the bout on all three scorecards with 95–91, 94–92, and 95–92. According to CompuBox, Fury landed 150 of 385 punches (39%), while Wilder connected with 72 of 355 punches (20%). The 150 punches landed on Wilder is the most ever landed by an opponent. Despite the back and forth nature of the bout, CompuBox calculated Fury as having outlanded Wilder in every single round of the fight, including the fourth round in which Fury was knocked down twice. The fight was widely acclaimed by observers and pundits for its action and high-level intensity: hall-of-fame promoter Bob Arum said, "I've been in this business 57 years promoting fights and I have to say I've truly never seen a heavyweight fight as magnificent as this", while the Ring magazine described it as "the obvious fight of the year so far" and "a rare and historic heavyweight championship trilogy".

==== Fury vs. Whyte ====
On 30 December 2021, WBC president Mauricio Sulaiman, who had ordered Fury to defend his WBC title against mandatory challenger Dillian Whyte, ruled that Fury as the reigning champion would be entitled to 80% of the purse, compared to Whyte's 20% as the challenger. Sulaiman had set a deadline of 11 January 2022 for purse bids, as the two fighters' camps could not agree to terms. However, this deadline was pushed back multiple times, in part due to ongoing negotiations from Fury's team who were trying to secure the fight for the undisputed heavyweight championship against undefeated WBA (Super), IBF and WBO heavyweight champion Oleksandr Usyk. A fight between Fury and Usyk did not materialise, as deposed former champion Anthony Joshua was unwilling to step aside to allow the two champions to fight.

The deadline for the Fury-Whyte purse bids was ultimately scheduled for 28 January 2022, when it was announced that Frank Warren's Queensberry Promotions had won the rights to promote the fight, with a winning bid of $41,025,000 (£31 million), beating out the $32,222,222 (£24 million) bid submitted by Eddie Hearn's Matchroom. Warren's bid was reported to be the highest successful purse bid in boxing history. Fury reacted to the news, stating on social media that he is "coming home", suggesting that the fight against Whyte would be the first time he would box on U.K. soil since his August 2018 win against Francesco Pianeta. On 25 February, it was officially announced that the fight would be taking place at Wembley Stadium in London, England on 23 April.

The first press conference for the fight took place on 1 March at Wembley Stadium, with Whyte absent. Whyte's lawyer stated that his client would not be partaking in promoting the fight, as "we still do not have things resolved". Despite his opponent's non-attendance, Fury as usual was "in full showman mode", declaring, "Even Tyson Fury versus his own shadow sells", and promising that the fight "is going to be a Ferrari racing a Vauxhall Corsa". When asked about Whyte's no-show, Fury opined, "He's definitely shown the white flag in my estimation." In addition, he stated that his bout against Whyte would be the final fight of his professional career, promising to retire after the fight: "I'm a two-time undisputed world champion. [I have] £150m in the bank and nothing to prove to anybody."

Tickets for the fight went on sale on 2 March. 85,000 of the 90,000 available tickets were sold within the first 3 hours, prompting Fury's promoter Frank Warren to begin the process of applying to the local authorities to expand the capacity to 100,000 fans, which would make Fury-Whyte the largest post-war boxing attendance in the history of the United Kingdom. The contest ultimately took place in front of a record-breaking crowd of 94,000 fans: 4,000 more than the attendance of Anthony Joshua vs. Wladimir Klitschko which also took place at Wembley Stadium in 2017, thus setting a new attendance record for a boxing match in Europe.

In the direct lead up to the fight, Fury performed an eight-minute video presentation and ring walk, accompanied by a large fireworks display, that some have ranked as one of the best ring walks in the history of the sport. In an audiovisual montage, the spectacle was opened by a purpose-made re-recording of Don McLean's "American Pie" to a compilation of Fury's knockouts, followed by a Saint George's Day display with the Union Jack and an instrumental rendition of English patriotic song "Jerusalem". Fury was dressed head-to-toe in the colours of the St. George's Cross and wore gloves with the Cross on them. In contrast to the boos received by his opponent Whyte during his own ring walk, Fury was given a rousing reception by the crowd, stopping at one point to put on a crown and sit atop a throne. Following the video display, he walked out to a backdrop of "Juicy" by The Notorious B.I.G. and "Sex on Fire" by Kings of Leon.

Whyte unexpectedly boxed the first round in the southpaw stance, which was unusual for the primarily orthodox fighter. After a cautious first three minutes, Fury returned the favour at the start of the second round by switching between the southpaw and orthodox stances. The champion found success with the jab and check hook. In the fourth round, Whyte was cut over his right eye after a clash of heads. Fury continued to dominate the fight, landing a straight right in the fifth round which appeared to momentarily stun the challenger. With around ten seconds left of the sixth round, Fury landed a left jab, followed by a right uppercut which sent Whyte sprawling to the canvas. Although Whyte was able to beat the count and rise to his feet, the referee deemed it unsafe for him to continue, halting the fight after two minutes and fifty-nine seconds of the sixth round, declaring Fury the winner by sixth-round technical knockout. At the time of the stoppage, Fury was winning the bout on all three scorecards with 49–46, 48–47, and 50–45.

In his post-fight ring interview, Fury claimed that the fight against Whyte was the last of his professional boxing career: "I've been in this game 20 years, I'm 34 in a few months. I said the third Wilder fight would be my last but I felt I owed the fans one last homecoming. This is definitely the end of the Gypsy King and I went out with a bang. Tonight was amazing but this is the end." Fury appeared to have no regrets, stating, "I fulfilled everything I've ever wanted to fulfil. I will retire as only the second heavyweight in history, after Rocky Marciano, to retire undefeated. I was unbeatable at this game."

He announced his fourth retirement on 12 August 2022 and relinquished his Ring title.

==== Fury vs. Chisora III ====
On 20 October 2022, it was announced that Fury would return from his short-lived retirement to defend his WBC title against Derek Chisora in a trilogy bout on 3 December at Tottenham Hotspur Stadium in London, live on BT Sport Box Office.

On the night of the fight, Fury defeated Chisora via 10th-round TKO in front of a crowd of 60,000 fans, in a dominant performance. After the fight, Fury called on fellow undefeated heavyweight champion Oleksandr Usyk, who was seated ringside at the Tottenham Hotspur Stadium, to join him between the ropes. Fury indicated his preference to face Usyk as his next opponent to determine the undisputed heavyweight champion. Fury added he would be happy to face WBO interim champion Joe Joyce, who had also joined Fury and Usyk ringside post-fight.

==== Fury vs. Ngannou ====
Fury faced former UFC heavyweight champion Francis Ngannou in Riyadh, Saudi Arabia on 28 October 2023, in what was Ngannou's professional boxing debut. WBC officials confirmed the fight would be ten rounds and count as an official bout, although Fury's title would not be at stake.

Fury entered the fight as a 14–1 favourite, but he was knocked down in the third round. He went on to win the bout via controversial split decision. One judge scored the bout 95–94 to Ngannou, while the other two judges had it 96–93 and 95–94 in Fury's favour. According to CompuBox, Fury outlanded Ngannou 71 to 59 in total punches, while Ngannou outlanded Fury 37 to 32 in power punches. When asked in his in-ring interview about the fight, Fury said "[Ngannou] is a lot better of a boxer than we thought he'd be. He's a very awkward man, and he's a good puncher, and I respect him a lot. [...] I don't know how close [the fight] was, but I got the win and that's what it is." Oleksandr Usyk, who was in attendance, then entered the ring and faced off with Fury to promote their scheduled bout for the undisputed heavyweight championship.

=== Challenging for undisputed/unified heavyweight championship ===
==== Fury vs. Usyk ====
On 29 September 2023, it was announced Fury had signed a contract to face the unified WBA, WBO and IBF heavyweight champion Oleksandr Usyk for the undisputed heavyweight title in Riyadh, Saudi Arabia. The fight was originally scheduled for 23 December but was delayed to 17 February 2024 after Fury's bout with Francis Ngannou in October 2023. On 2 February, it was announced the fight had been postponed again after Fury suffered a cut in sparring above his right eye that required "urgent medical attention" and "significant stitching". The fight was rescheduled for 18 May 2024 and would crown the first undisputed heavyweight champion of the four belt era, as well as the first undisputed heavyweight champion in nearly 25 years.

Fury lost the bout via split decision, the first loss in his professional boxing career. The opening rounds of the fight were closely contested, with Usyk applying constant pressure and landing power punches, while Fury found success with his jab, fighting off the back foot. From round 4, Fury became increasingly dominant, appearing to hurt Usyk with uppercuts in round 6. However, in the later rounds Usyk began to mount a comeback, particularly in a dramatic ninth round where he was able to badly hurt Fury with a series of punches, scoring a knockdown near the end of the round as Fury fell into the ropes. Although Fury was able to recover and attempted to rally, the judges ultimately awarded Usyk the victory. One judge had it 114–113 for Fury, while the other two scored it 115–112 and 114–113 in Usyk's favour. CompuBox suggested Fury had landed 157 of 496 punches (31.7%) whilst Usyk landed 170 of 407 (41.8%).

==== Fury vs. Usyk II ====
Usyk and Fury were expected to meet in a rematch in October 2024 at Kingdom Arena in Riyadh, Saudi Arabia. On 29 May 2024 it was announced that the rematch was scheduled for 21 December 2024. The total purse for the rematch was reportedly worth $190–191 million (£150 million). While the purse split was not disclosed, it was speculated to be either 55/45 or 60/40 in favour of Usyk, meaning Fury would be guaranteed $75–84 million. However, Usyk's manager Alexander Krassyuk denied these speculations: "We do not have a specific purse distribution. We have certain agreements: Tyson Fury has agreements with the organizers, and Oleksandr Usyk has agreements with the organizers." With Usyk vacating the IBF heavyweight title on 25 June 2024, the undisputed status was not on the line. In December 2024 before the fight, Fury stated that Usyk was the best boxer in the world.

Usyk won the bout by unanimous decision with all three ringside judges scoring it 116–112. The fight was just as competitive as the first encounter. By the end of the fight, neither boxer was particularly hurt. Usyk landed with some stinging shots which pushed Fury back, while Fury landed some hard shots to head and body. A few times in the fight Fury turned southpaw. He tried to lean on Usyk and weigh him down, but Usyk did well to fight him off and keep him at a distance. He used his footwork to move strategically around the ring.

According to CompuBox, Usyk landed 179 punches out of 423 (42.3% accuracy), while Fury connected on 144 punches of 509 (28.3%). Usyk outlanded Fury in rounds 2–3 and 5–12; Fury outlanded Usyk in the fourth (11 punches to 10), while the opening round was even (six punches each). Usyk also connected on more power punches in seven rounds out of twelve, including the first round, while the last round was even (11 shots each). Writers from ESPN, The Independent, The New York Times, MMA Fighting, CBS Sports, The Sporting News and Bad Left Hook all had Usyk winning, with scores ranging from 115–113 to 117–111.

Fury felt he did enough to win the rematch. His promoter Frank Warren was shocked at the scorecards. He brought the scorecard sheet into the ring. 7 out of the 12 rounds were all scored unanimously for Usyk on all three judges cards. Prior to speaking to the reporters, Warren showed Fury the scorecards, which led Fury and his team to exit the ring and make their way to the dressing room. Warren said, "I showed it to him, I'm dumbfounded. They gave him four rounds out of 12, which is impossible. I've been around a long time, and I know I'm biased, but one judge didn't give him any rounds from six onwards. Not one round. How can that be? Same with another judge, he gave him one round out of the last six, and the same here with this guy. It's crazy." Usyk spoke with respect towards Fury in the post-fight ring interviews, "I very respect this guy because I think he's very tough .. Tyson Fury makes me strong. Tyson is a great opponent. Big man. He's a good man. Tyson, a lot of talk, but it's just show." Usyk felt the rematch was easier than the first. Despite being absent in the ring following the fight, Fury attended the post-fight press conference. He said, "More serious … I thought I won the fight again … I was on the front foot the entire time. When you don't get the knockout, this is what can happen." Heading into the final round, Fury was confident he was ahead.

=== Post-title career ===
==== Fury vs. Makhmudov ====
On 13 January 2025, Fury announced his fifth retirement from professional boxing via Instagram. Some commentators had speculated on a potential return in light of his previous retirement announcements. On 4 January 2026, Fury appeared to announce a return to professional boxing, again via Instagram. On 28 January 2026, it was announced that Fury would fight Arslanbek Makhmudov (21–2, 19 KOs) on 11 April 2026 at a venue to be confirmed later in the United Kingdom. It was announced on 12 February 2026, that the fight would take place at Tottenham Hotspur Stadium in London. The fight would be broadcast on Netflix, which would be the first time Fury fought on the video streaming service. Fury reportedly received a purse of $25 million (£18.6 million) for the fight, with Makhmudov receiving a career-high purse of £2 million. Fury weighed in at 267.9 lbs, while Makhumudov weighed in slightly lighter at 264.9 lbs.

On fight night, Fury showed no real signs of ring rust after his 15-month lay-off as he outboxed Makhumudov with ease to a unanimous decision victory, with the judges' scorecards reading 120–108 x2 and 119–109 in favour of Fury. After the fight, Turki Al-Sheikh indicated that Fury would be facing his longtime British rival Anthony Joshua next. Fury addressed Joshua who was ringside, exclaiming: "Let's give the fight fans what they want. Do not run from me this time. Ten years in the making. Let's dance." Joshua initially declined to speak, before replying, "I punched you up when we were kids and I'll punch you up again."

At the post-fight press conference, Fury reiterated his desire to face Joshua next, and clarified that while he had already signed for the fight, he was unclear if Joshua had done the same, and expressed doubt that he would do: "[Joshua] was brought here tonight, ringside, for a reason. To get the fight done. I signed months ago, I don’t know if he’s signed, and by the looks of it, he’s not gonna [sic]."

==== Fury vs. Wach ====
After the fight with Joshua was confirmed to take place later in the year, Warren stated there was a likelihood of Fury taking another fight in the interim. Fury had a plan to take three fights in 2026. The fight in August was being classed as a “warm-up” fight. Fury wanted to avoid ring rust before the big Joshua fight, not wanting to wait until November without having a fight. The opponent was going to be someone recognisable enough to sell tickets but not overly dangerous, so as not to jeopardise the Joshua fight. Meanwhile, Joshua was scheduled to face Kristian Prenga in July, also a 'warm-up' fight. In June, Hearn criticised Fury’s plan to take an extra tune‑up fight before a proposed bout with Joshua, stating that “more rounds ain’t going to help you.” Hearn argued that Fury’s performance in his victory over Makhmudov showed vulnerabilities that Joshua could exploit. On 30 June, it was announced that Fury would be fighting 46-year-old Polish boxer Mariusz Wach (39–13, 20 KOs) in Thailand at the Max Muay Thai Stadium in Pattaya on 24 July, one day prior to Joshua's fight against Prenga. Wach had lost 12 of his last 20 bouts, dating back to November 2015. Fury stated that the event would not be streamed live and would be shown instead as part of the Netflix reality series At Home with the Furys. Despite Netflix appearing on promotional material, its involvement was connected to filming for the series rather than live broadcast coverage. There was a possibility the event could be live-streamed on Goldstar’s YouTube channel, however this was not confirmed. For the first time in 15 years, Fury weighed in lighter than his opponent. He weighed 265 pounds, while Wach came in at 291.4 pounds.

Fury fought second on the card rather than headlining, in front of approximately 1,500 spectators. Fury defeated Wach after Wach's corner withdrew him from the fight following the seventh round. Despite being caught with a punch in the second round, Fury mostly controlled the bout. Fury explained that ring inactivity had been a concern and that he wanted rounds rather than an early knockout win. Following the win, Fury stated that he was going to travel home to his family, rather than travel to Jeddah, to be ringside to watch Joshua fight Prenga. The event was held in support of the Father Ray Foundation, a charity for underprivileged children in Thailand.

==== Fury vs. Joshua ====
A mega fight between Fury and his British heavyweight rival Anthony Joshua had been discussed since 2016. There were times when the fight was considered while both held world titles; however, mandatories and broken-down negotiations always played a key role in preventing the fight from crossing the line. The fight came very close to happening in 2021 for the undisputed heavyweight championship but was derailed when Wilder exercised a rematch clause against Fury, leading to a trilogy between Fury and Wilder. Joshua went on to lose his unified world titles to Usyk, and Fury made some defences, eventually losing his WBC title to Usyk in 2024. On 12 December 2025, Ring magazine announced the fight would finally take place in 2026 under Riyadh Season, after both Fury and Joshua take warm-up fights. Frank Warren told Sky Sports News: "There's been some talks going on, there's nothing been signed yet, but Tyson's indicated if it's the right deal, he'll definitely do it." After stopping Jake Paul, Joshua said, “If Tyson Fury is serious, step in the ring with me next … Don’t do all that talking, let’s fight.” Joshua was then involved in a fatal car crash on 29 December in Nigeria, where two of his close friends died, and Joshua suffering minor injuries, putting doubts on the future of his career. As with many big fights involving Al-Sheikh, it was believed that both Fury and Joshua would sign their own contracts through him to make the fight happen. According to Warren, Fury had signed his contract. On 15 April, Hearn confirmed that a match between Fury and Joshua would not take place at Croke Park in Dublin. This was despite speculation following remarks from the park's chief executive, Peter McKenna, about a potential event featuring Fury alongside Katie Taylor's farewell fight. Hearn wanted Taylor to be the sole focus of her farewell fight. Hearn speculated that the match could happen in November and be promoted by Sela.

On 27 April, Al-Sheikh announced the fight between Fury and Joshua would take place later in the year, on Netflix. There was much public dispute over who was actually promoting the fight and where the event would be taking place. Dana White of Zuffa Boxing claimed involvement in negotiating the event and questioned the role of established promoters, while Hearn stated that the existing contract specified the United Kingdom as the host country and that no official confirmation had been made regarding the location. There were reports that venues in the United States were also being considered, prior to this. In July, Al-Sheikh stated that Wembley Stadium was his preferred venue for the bout, but said the location had not yet been finalised. He explained that staging the fight in England depended on whether Wembley could allow a later start time to suit international broadcasters, particularly the US. Wembley normally adhered to a 10:30pm curfew, sometimes extended to 11pm, but Al-Sheikh said the fight would need to take place later at night to suit the global audience. In August 2026, WBC president Mauricio Sulaiman stated that the bout would be approved as a final eliminator for the WBC championship. Sulaiman argued that the fight was justified by the organisation's rankings, with Fury as the No. 1 contender and Joshua ranked fifth at the time. He said the WBC would be "proud to be part of that promotion" and praised Fury as "one of the greatest ambassadors ever of the WBC". He also noted Joshua's long association with the organisation and suggested that "maybe this will be the time to bring Anthony Joshua to the WBC".

On 24 September 2026, it was announced Fury and Joshua would face off on 11 December at Principality Stadium in Cardiff, Wales, and that the WBA (Super) heavyweight title would be on the line, meaning that the winner of the fight would become a three-time world heavyweight champion. Some residents of Cardiff objected to plans for the fight to be staged in the early hours of the morning. Organisers applied for a licence extension that would allow the event to continue until 3 a.m., with ring walks proposed for approximately 1 a.m. to accommodate a global broadcast schedule. Opponents of the application argued that the event would cause excessive noise, disruption, and anti-social behaviour, while supporters promoted it for its potential economic benefits. A decision on the licence extension was scheduled to be made by Cardiff Council's Licensing Sub-Committee on 25 November 2026.

== Professional wrestling ==
Fury made an appearance in an angle on WWE's debut of SmackDown on Fox on 4 October 2019. Appearing as a fan, he stared down Braun Strowman during his match, and Strowman later threw one of his opponents, Dolph Ziggler, at Fury. After the match, Fury jumped the barricade, but was stopped by security. On 11 October, it was confirmed that Fury and Strowman would have a match at WWE Crown Jewel in Saudi Arabia. At Crown Jewel on 31 October, Fury defeated Strowman via countout. Fury reportedly earned £11.9 million ($15 million) for his participation. Fury later made an appearance on an episode of SmackDown on 8 November at the Manchester Arena, shaking hands with Strowman and suggesting they form a tag team together before both being challenged by the B-Team (Bo Dallas and Curtis Axel), who they left laying in the ring.

Fury again appeared at Clash at the Castle on 3 September 2022, this time knocking out Austin Theory and later staring down with WWE Universal Champion Roman Reigns, before singing a rendition of American Pie alongside Drew McIntyre.

== Other ventures ==
In September 2019, Penguin Random House imprint Century secured the publishing rights to Fury's autobiography, titled Behind the Mask: My Autobiography. It was released on 14 November 2019 and reached the number-one bestseller position on Amazon with 24 hours of its release. His second book, entitled The Furious Method, was published in 2020. A self-help book, it is "full of inspirational advice for readers on how we can all improve our physical and mental health". The book was a commercial success, and is a Sunday Times bestseller.

Fury appeared in a four-part ITV documentary named Meet the Furys, which followed the Fury family while Tyson was preparing to fight in Las Vegas for the first time. ITV later commissioned another documentary about Fury, titled Tyson Fury: The Gypsy King, which showed Fury and his family during the build-up to the Wilder rematch. A Netflix series about Fury and his family, At Home with the Furys, was released on 16 August 2023. A second series was released on 12 April 2026.

Known for his habit of impromptu singing, Fury regularly gained media attention for singing songs in the boxing ring after matches and during promotional events. In 2019, Fury appeared as a guest vocalist on English singer-songwriter Robbie Williams' studio album The Christmas Present, for the song "Bad Sharon". On 11 November 2022, Fury released a cover of "Sweet Caroline" as a single to raise money for the men's mental health charity, Talk Club.

Fury has expressed an interest in competing in mixed martial arts. In November 2019, he had a training session with Darren Till, who said there is a 70% chance that Fury will compete in MMA. Fury also mentioned that Conor McGregor has offered to train him should he crossover to MMA.

On 16 February 2022, Fury launched a new range of energy drinks named Furocity Energy to rival market leaders Red Bull and Monster Energy. He has since released Furocity ice lollies, energy gum, and protein bars.

Fury signed a sponsorship deal with local club Morecambe F.C. before their 2022–23 League One campaign, with the Gypsy King brand appearing on the team's shorts. Fury has displayed interest in purchasing the club. In the north east corner of the club's main stadium is a two-storey building which houses the Tyson Fury Foundation, and a gym which Fury purchased in August 2020. Fury said of the foundation (which houses boxing, football and rugby facilities) that "It's giving the next Tyson Fury or the next Wayne Rooney the chance that we had." He also owns the fenced-off 3G pitches neighbouring the stadium.

Fury took part in Soccer Aid for UNICEF 2025, held on 15 June at Old Trafford. He co-managed England, working alongside Wayne Rooney and other staff. He did not play, having joked beforehand that he had “two left feet.” During the event, Fury attracted attention for an expletive-filled pre-match team talk broadcast live on ITV, which prompted on-air apologies from presenters. England initially took a 3–0 lead but ultimately lost 5–4 to the World XI after a comeback led by Carlos Tevez.

== Public image ==
After Fury became world champion in 2015, the British media began to scrutinise what he had said in the past. He received criticism for having said that he would "hang" his sister if she was promiscuous, as well as comments made in an interview before the Klitschko fight in which he denounced abortion, paedophilia, and homosexuality, saying that the legalisation of these behaviours would bring forth a Biblical reckoning.

Fury was nominated for the 2015 BBC Sports Personality of the Year Award but around 140,000 people signed a petition claiming that his equation of homosexuality with paedophilia should disqualify him. When asked about the petition by a BBC journalist, Fury quoted religious phrases, including "believe in the Lord Jesus Christ and you will be saved," along with John 3:16: "For God so loved the world, He gave His only begotten Son, whoever believes in Him shall have eternal life and shall not perish." Fury ultimately came fourth in the SPOTY award and said at the ceremony, "I've said a lot of stuff in the past and none of it is with intentions to hurt anybody. I apologise to anyone that's been hurt by it."

Fury was later criticised for comments on transgender people and "Zionist Jewish people who own all the banks, all the papers, all the TV stations" in a May 2016 interview. The interview was later deleted and Fury apologised: "I said some things which may have hurt some people, which as a Christian man is not something I would ever want to do. Though it is not an excuse, sometimes the heightened media scrutiny has caused me to act out in public and then my words can get taken out of context. I mean no harm or disrespect to anyone and I know more is expected of me as an ambassador of British boxing and I promise in future to hold myself up to the highest possible standard."

Fury was formerly known for his attention-grabbing antics, such as arriving at a press conference in a Lamborghini and wearing a Batman costume. After his hiatus, he has said that he does not want to "play a character anymore". He stated in November 2017, "I feel I have a story to tell, a massive one. The stuff I've been through, depression, mental health problems. It can help and inspire others. From 18 stone to 27. From a clean living man to drugs and alcohol and back to the heavyweight world champion again. I hope the legacy and story I leave behind will help others in the future of what to do and not to do." Although Fury has vowed to rein in his entertaining behaviour, he is still known for his vibrant personality, with promoter Bob Arum stating that he "hasn't seen a fighter with that much charisma since Muhammad Ali". Since his return to the ring and his strong performance against Wilder, Fury has been dubbed "The People's Champion" due to his open and honest discussion about his mental health struggles. He is currently an ambassador for the former British world champion Frank Bruno's mental health charity, The Frank Bruno Foundation.

In 2020, Fury publicly thanked Daniel Kinahan for his role in brokering a potential Tyson Fury vs. Anthony Joshua fight. In 2018, an Irish High Court judge stated that Kinahan, who has no previous criminal convictions, is a senior figure in organised crime on a global scale. The Irish government expressed its "outrage" over the involvement of Kinahan in the brokering of the proposed fight. On 24 June 2020, it was announced that Fury had parted ways with Kinahan as an advisor. Fury was photographed alongside Kinahan in Dubai in February 2022. Fury was refused entry to the United States in June 2022, reportedly as a result of his links with Kinahan, who is subject to sanctions by the U.S. government's Office of Foreign Assets Control. On 14 June 2026, Fury attended UFC Freedom 250 at the White House in Washington, D.C.. Fury credited UFC CEO Dana White with bringing his visa issue to the attention of President Donald Trump, who allowed him to re-enter the country.

Fury has been named multiple times among the highest paid athletes in the world by Forbes: he was ranked 11th in 2020 (estimated income $57 million), 18th in 2022 ($62 million), 42nd in 2024 ($50 million) and 3rd in 2025 ($146 million). He was also included in the annual highest-paid athletes in the world list by Sportico several times: he was named 14th highest-paid athlete of 2022 (estimated earnings $69 million), 64th in 2023 ($40 million) and 3rd in 2024 ($147 million).

== Personal life ==
Fury met his wife Paris (née Mullroy) when she was 15 and he was 17. They began dating the year after they met, and married in 2008 at St. Peter in Chains Catholic Church in Doncaster, South Yorkshire. The couple have seven children together: four sons (all named Prince) and three daughters. When Fury was asked why all of his sons had the first name Prince, he said, "I'm a king and they're princes until they earn their rightful name." He named his first son Prince after Prince Naseem, his favourite British fighter. Paris suffered a miscarriage before Fury's cancelled bout with Ustinov in 2014, and lost another child on the day of his comeback fight against Seferi in 2018.

Fury's mother was raised Protestant and his father is a Catholic, though neither actively practised their religions; he was instead introduced to religion by his uncle, a born-again Christian and Pentecostal preacher in the Irish Traveller community. The Guardian described Fury's beliefs as "a mixture of traditional Roman Catholic ... and a particularly literal interpretation of evangelical Christianity". His wife is a practising Catholic and was also raised in an Irish Traveller family.

Fury and his family reside on the Isle of Man, having moved from Morecambe, Lancashire in 2025. He also owns a home in Las Vegas, but decided to let his boxing trainer live there because he is unsure about spending more time in the US. In September 2015, he expressed an interest in running to be an independent MP for Morecambe and Lunesdale, stating that the government was too focused on providing services for immigrants and not enough on homeless people and those with drug and alcohol problems.

In April 2016, Fury spoke about the racial abuse he receives as an Irish Traveller, stating that "no one wants to see a Gypsy do well". He stated, "I am a Gypsy and that's it. I will always be a Gypsy, I'll never change. I will always be fat and white and that's it. I am the champion yet I am thought of as a bum." Since his return from his hiatus, Fury has stated that he still feels bias against his community.

Fury is a fan of Manchester United and attends football matches at their home ground Old Trafford. He also supports the England national team.

== Professional boxing record ==
39 fights	36 wins	2 losses
By knockout	25	0
By decision	11	2
Draws	1	

No.	Result	Record	Opponent	Type	Round, time	Date	Location	Notes
39	Win	36–2–1	Mariusz Wach	RTD	7 (12), 3:00	24 Jul 2026	Max Muay Thai Stadium, Pattaya, Thailand	
38	Win	35–2–1	Arslanbek Makhmudov	UD	12	11 Apr 2026	Tottenham Hotspur Stadium, London, England	
37	Loss	34–2–1	Oleksandr Usyk	UD	12	21 Dec 2024	Kingdom Arena, Riyadh, Saudi Arabia	For WBA (Super), WBC, WBO, IBO and The Ring heavyweight titles
36	Loss	34–1–1	Oleksandr Usyk	SD	12	18 May 2024	Kingdom Arena, Riyadh, Saudi Arabia	Lost WBC heavyweight title; For WBA (Super), IBF, WBO, IBO, and The Ring heavyweight titles
35	Win	34–0–1	Francis Ngannou	SD	10	28 Oct 2023	Kingdom Arena, Riyadh, Saudi Arabia	
34	Win	33–0–1	Derek Chisora	TKO	10 (12), 2:51	3 Dec 2022	Tottenham Hotspur Stadium, London, England	Retained WBC heavyweight title
33	Win	32–0–1	Dillian Whyte	TKO	6 (12), 2:59	23 Apr 2022	Wembley Stadium, London, England	Retained WBC and The Ring heavyweight titles
32	Win	31–0–1	Deontay Wilder	KO	11 (12), 1:10	9 Oct 2021	T-Mobile Arena, Paradise, Nevada, US	Retained WBC and The Ring heavyweight titles
31	Win	30–0–1	Deontay Wilder	TKO	7 (12), 1:39	22 Feb 2020	MGM Grand Garden Arena, Paradise, Nevada, US	Won WBC and vacant The Ring heavyweight titles
30	Win	29–0–1	Otto Wallin	UD	12	14 Sep 2019	T-Mobile Arena, Paradise, Nevada, US	
29	Win	28–0–1	Tom Schwarz	TKO	2 (12), 2:54	15 Jun 2019	MGM Grand Garden Arena, Paradise, Nevada, US	Won WBO Inter-Continental heavyweight title
28	Draw	27–0–1	Deontay Wilder	SD	12	1 Dec 2018	Staples Center, Los Angeles, California, US	For WBC heavyweight title
27	Win	27–0	Francesco Pianeta	PTS	10	18 Aug 2018	Windsor Park, Belfast, Northern Ireland	
26	Win	26–0	Sefer Seferi	RTD	4 (10), 3:00	9 Jun 2018	Manchester Arena, Manchester, England	
25	Win	25–0	Wladimir Klitschko	UD	12	28 Nov 2015	Esprit Arena, Düsseldorf, Germany	Won WBA (Super), IBF, WBO, IBO, and The Ring heavyweight titles
24	Win	24–0	Christian Hammer	RTD	8 (12), 3:00	28 Feb 2015	The O2 Arena, London, England	Retained WBO International heavyweight title
23	Win	23–0	Derek Chisora	RTD	10 (12), 3:00	29 Nov 2014	ExCeL, London, England	Won European, WBO International, and vacant British heavyweight titles
22	Win	22–0	Joey Abell	TKO	4 (10), 1:48	15 Feb 2014	Copper Box Arena, London, England	
21	Win	21–0	Steve Cunningham	KO	7 (12), 2:55	20 Apr 2013	The Theater at Madison Square Garden, New York City, New York, US	
20	Win	20–0	Kevin Johnson	UD	12	1 Dec 2012	Odyssey Arena, Belfast, Northern Ireland	
19	Win	19–0	Vinny Maddalone	TKO	5 (12), 1:35	7 Jul 2012	Hand Arena, Clevedon, England	Won vacant WBO Inter-Continental heavyweight title
18	Win	18–0	Martin Rogan	TKO	5 (12), 3:00	14 Apr 2012	Odyssey Arena, Belfast, Northern Ireland	Won vacant Irish heavyweight title
17	Win	17–0	Neven Pajkić	TKO	3 (12), 2:44	12 Nov 2011	EventCity, Manchester, England	Retained Commonwealth heavyweight title
16	Win	16–0	Nicolai Firtha	TKO	5 (12), 2:19	18 Sep 2011	King's Hall, Belfast, Northern Ireland	
15	Win	15–0	Derek Chisora	UD	12	23 Jul 2011	Wembley Arena, London, England	Won British and Commonwealth heavyweight titles
14	Win	14–0	Marcelo Nascimento	KO	5 (10), 2:48	19 Feb 2011	Wembley Arena, London, England	
13	Win	13–0	Zack Page	UD	8	19 Dec 2010	Colisée Pepsi, Quebec City, Quebec, Canada	
12	Win	12–0	Rich Power	PTS	8	10 Sep 2010	York Hall, London, England	
11	Win	11–0	John McDermott	TKO	9 (12), 1:08	25 Jun 2010	Brentwood Centre Arena, Brentwood, England	Won vacant English heavyweight title
10	Win	10–0	Hans-Jörg Blasko	TKO	1 (8), 2:14	5 Mar 2010	Leisure Centre, Huddersfield, England	
9	Win	9–0	Tomas Mrazek	PTS	6	26 Sep 2009	The O2, Dublin, Ireland	
8	Win	8–0	John McDermott	PTS	10	11 Sep 2009	Brentwood Centre Arena, Brentwood, England	Won English heavyweight title
7	Win	7–0	Aleksandrs Selezens	TKO	3 (6), 0:48	18 Jul 2009	York Hall, London, England	
6	Win	6–0	Scott Belshaw	TKO	2 (8), 0:52	23 May 2009	Colosseum, Watford, England	
5	Win	5–0	Matthew Ellis	KO	1 (6), 0:48	11 Apr 2009	York Hall, London, England	
4	Win	4–0	Lee Swaby	RTD	4 (6), 3:00	14 Mar 2009	Aston Events Centre, Birmingham, England	
3	Win	3–0	Daniil Peretyatko	RTD	2 (6), 3:00	28 Feb 2009	Showground, Norwich, England	
2	Win	2–0	Marcel Zeller	TKO	3 (6), 2:50	17 Jan 2009	DW Stadium, Wigan, England	
1	Win	1–0	Béla Gyöngyösi	TKO	1 (6), 2:14	6 Dec 2008	National Ice Centre, Nottingham, England	

== Titles in boxing ==
=== Major world titles ===
- WBA (Super) heavyweight champion (200+ lbs)
- WBC heavyweight champion (200+ lbs)
- IBF heavyweight champion (200+ lbs)
- WBO heavyweight champion (200+ lbs)

=== The Ring magazine titles ===
- The Ring heavyweight champion (200+ lbs) (2×)

=== Minor world titles ===
- IBO heavyweight champion (200+ lbs)

=== Regional/International titles ===
- WBO International heavyweight champion (200+ lbs)
- WBO Inter-Continental heavyweight champion (200+ lbs) (2×)
- European heavyweight champion (200+ lbs)
- British heavyweight champion (200+ lbs) (2×)
- Commonwealth heavyweight champion (200+ lbs)
- English heavyweight champion (200+ lbs)
- Irish heavyweight champion (200+ lbs)

=== Honorary titles ===
- WBC Maya II champion
- WBC Union champion
- WBC Riyadh champion
- WBC METTA Humanitarian champion

== Viewership ==
=== International ===
Date	Fight	Viewership	Network	Country	Source(s)	Note(s)
23 July 2011	Derek Chisora vs. Tyson Fury	2,260,000	Channel 5	United Kingdom		(Note: Average viewers)
23 July 2011	Derek Chisora vs. Tyson Fury	2,900,000	Channel 5	United Kingdom		(Note: Peak viewers)
20 April 2013	Tyson Fury vs. Steve Cunningham	1,200,000	NBC Sports	United States		
20 April 2013	Tyson Fury vs. Steve Cunningham	1,700,000	NBC Sports	United States		
28 November 2015	Wladimir Klitschko vs. Tyson Fury	8,910,000	RTL Television	Germany		
28 November 2015	Wladimir Klitschko vs. Tyson Fury	9,700,000	Inter	Ukraine		(Note: Total viewers)
28 November 2015	Wladimir Klitschko vs. Tyson Fury	1,038,000	HBO	United States		
28 November 2015	Wladimir Klitschko vs. Tyson Fury	1,714,000	HBO	United States		(Note: Average viewers, re-play included)
28 November 2015	Wladimir Klitschko vs. Tyson Fury	681,800	RTL Televizija	Croatia		
9 June 2018	Tyson Fury vs. Sefer Seferi	814,000	BT Sport	United Kingdom		
	Total viewership	30,917,800				

=== Pay-per-view bouts ===
Date	Fight	Country	Network	Buys	Source(s)
28 November 2015	Wladimir Klitschko vs. Tyson Fury	United Kingdom, Ireland	Sky Sports Box Office	655,000	
1 December 2018	Deontay Wilder vs. Tyson Fury	United Kingdom, Ireland	BT Sport Box Office	420,000	
1 December 2018	Deontay Wilder vs. Tyson Fury	United States	Showtime	325,000	
15 June 2019	Tyson Fury vs. Tom Schwarz	United Kingdom, Ireland	BT Sport Box Office	Unknown	
14 September 2019	Tyson Fury vs. Otto Wallin	United Kingdom, Ireland	BT Sport Box Office	Unknown	
22 February 2020	Deontay Wilder vs. Tyson Fury II	United Kingdom, Ireland	BT Sport Box Office	800,000	
22 February 2020	Deontay Wilder vs. Tyson Fury II	United States	ESPN/Fox Sports	1,200,000	
9 October 2021	Tyson Fury vs. Deontay Wilder III	United Kingdom, Ireland	BT Sport Box Office	300,000	
9 October 2021	Tyson Fury vs. Deontay Wilder III	United States	ESPN/Fox Sports	600,000	
23 April 2022	Tyson Fury vs. Dillian Whyte	United Kingdom, Ireland	BT Sport Box Office	Unknown	
23 April 2022	Tyson Fury vs. Dillian Whyte	United States	ESPN	Unknown	
3 December 2022	Tyson Fury vs. Derek Chisora III	United Kingdom, Ireland	BT Sport Box Office	500,000	
28 October 2023	Tyson Fury vs. Francis Ngannou	United Kingdom, Ireland	TNT Sports Box Office	Unknown	
28 October 2023	Tyson Fury vs. Francis Ngannou	United States	ESPN	67,500	
18 May 2024	Tyson Fury vs. Oleksandr Usyk	Worldwide	multiple (Note: DAZN PPV, PPV.com, ESPN+ PPV, Sky Box Office, TNT Sports Box Office)	1,500,000	
24 December 2024	Oleksandr Usyk vs. Tyson Fury II	Worldwide	multiple	500,000+	
	Total buys			6,867,500+	

== Boxing awards ==
- The Ring magazine Fighter of the Year: 2015, 2020 (Note: Shared with Teofimo Lopez.)
- Best Boxer ESPY Award: 2020, 2021
- Sports Illustrated Fighter of the Year: 2020
- WBN Fighter of the Year: 2018

== Filmography ==
Film
Year	Title	Role	Notes	Ref.
2024	Battle of the Baddest	Himself	Documentary	
2024	A Tale As Old As Time: Ring of Fire	Himself	Promotional short film	
2024	Reignited - Can’t Get You Out of My Head	Himself	Promotional short film	

Television
Year	Title	Role	Notes	Ref.
2019	Meet the Furys	Himself	4 episodes	
2020	Tyson Fury: The Gypsy King	Himself	3 episodes	
2023–present	At Home with the Furys	Himself	2 seasons	
2024	The Fight Life	Himself	1 episode	

Video games
Year	Title	Role	Ref.
2020	EA Sports UFC 4	Himself	
2024	Undisputed	Himself	

== Discography ==
Singles

- "Sweet Caroline" (2022)

Duets

- "Bad Sharon" (2019)

== Bibliography ==
Non-fiction

- Behind the Mask: My Autobiography (2019)
- The Furious Method (2020)
- Gloves Off (2022)

== See also ==
- List of world heavyweight boxing champions
- List of WBA world champions
- List of WBC world champions
- List of IBF world champions
- List of WBO world champions
- List of IBO world champions
- List of The Ring world champions
- List of European Boxing Union heavyweight champions
- List of British heavyweight boxing champions
- List of Commonwealth Boxing Council champions

== Notes ==
Sporting positions
Amateur boxing titles
Previous: David Price	ABA super-heavyweight champion 2008	Next: Simon Vallily
Regional boxing titles
Preceded by John McDermott	English heavyweight champion 11 September 2009 – March 2010; Vacated	Vacant Title next held by Himself
Vacant Title last held by Himself	English heavyweight champion 25 June 2010 – July 2011; Vacated	Vacant Title next held by David Price
Preceded by Derek Chisora	British heavyweight champion 23 July 2011 – 8 February 2012; Vacated	Vacant Title next held by David Price
Preceded by Derek Chisora	Commonwealth heavyweight champion 23 July 2011 – 8 February 2012; Vacated	Vacant Title next held by David Price
Vacant Title last held by Coleman Barrett	Irish heavyweight champion 14 April 2012 – ? Vacated	Vacant
Vacant Title last held by Robert Helenius	WBO Inter-Continental heavyweight champion 7 July 2012 – July 2013; Vacated	Vacant Title next held by Andy Ruiz Jr.
Preceded by Derek Chisora	European heavyweight champion 29 November 2014 – July 2015; Vacated	Vacant Title next held by Erkan Teper
Vacant Title last held by David Price	British heavyweight champion 29 November 2014 – 17 April 2015; Vacated	Vacant Title next held by Anthony Joshua
Preceded by Derek Chisora	WBO International heavyweight champion 29 November 2014 – 28 November 2015; Won world title	Vacant Title next held by Alexander Povetkin
Preceded by Tom Schwarz	WBO Inter-Continental heavyweight champion 15 June 2019 – October 2019; Vacated	Vacant Title next held by Derek Chisora
Minor world boxing titles
Preceded by Wladimir Klitschko	IBO heavyweight champion 28 November 2015 – 12 October 2016; Retired	Vacant Title next held by Anthony Joshua
Major world boxing titles
Preceded by Wladimir Klitschko	WBA heavyweight champion Super title 28 November 2015 – 10 December 2015; Status changed	Vacant Title next held by Anthony Joshua
Vacant Title last held by Wladimir Klitschko	WBA heavyweight champion Unified title 10 December 2015 – 12 October 2016; Retired	Title discontinued
Preceded by Wladimir Klitschko	IBF heavyweight champion 28 November 2015 – 8 December 2015; Stripped	Vacant Title next held by Charles Martin
Preceded by Wladimir Klitschko	WBO heavyweight champion 28 November 2015 – 12 October 2016; Retired	Vacant Title next held by Joseph Parker
Preceded by Wladimir Klitschko	The Ring heavyweight champion 28 November 2015 – 1 February 2018; Stripped	Vacant Title next held by Himself
Preceded by Deontay Wilder	WBC heavyweight champion 22 February 2020 – 18 May 2024	Succeeded by Oleksandr Usyk
Vacant Title last held by Himself	The Ring heavyweight champion 22 February 2020 – 13 August 2022; Vacated	Vacant Title next held by Oleksandr Usyk
Awards
Previous: Sergey Kovalev	The Ring Fighter of the Year; 2015	Next: Carl Frampton
Previous: Chris Algieri vs. Ruslan Provodnikov	The Ring Upset of the Year vs. Wladimir Klitschko; 2015	Next: Joe Smith Jr. vs. Andrzej Fonfara
Previous: Sadam Ali	The Ring Comeback of the Year; 2018	Next: Jamel Herring
Previous: Dominic Breazeale vs. Izu Ugonoh; Round 3	The Ring Round of the Year vs. Deontay Wilder; Round 12; 2018	Next: Andy Ruiz Jr. vs. Anthony Joshua; Round 3
Previous: John Molina Jr. vs. Ivan Redkach; Round 3	PBC Round of the Year vs. Deontay Wilder; Round 12; 2018	Next: Errol Spence Jr. vs. Shawn Porter; Round 11
Previous: Canelo Álvarez	The Ring Fighter of the Year; 2020; With: Teófimo López	Next: Canelo Álvarez
Previous: Jose Zepeda vs. Ivan Baranchyk	The Ring Fight of the Year vs. Deontay Wilder III; 2021	Next: Leigh Wood vs. Michael Conlan
Previous: Jose Zepeda vs. Ivan Baranchyk; Round 5	The Ring Round of the Year vs. Deontay Wilder III; Round 4; 2021	Next: Sebastian Fundora vs. Erickson Lubin; Round 7
Previous: O'Shaquie Foster vs. Eduardo Hernandez; Round 11	The Ring Round of the Year vs. Oleksandr Usyk; Round 9; 2024	Next: Seiya Tsutsumi vs. Daigo Higa; Round 9
