= At Home with the Furys =

British television documentary series

- Genre: Documentary
- Starring: Tyson Fury; Paris Fury; John Fury; Tommy Fury; Molly-Mae Hague
- Country of origin: United Kingdom
- Original language: English
- No. of series: 2
- No. of episodes: 19

Production
- Running time: 28–42 minutes
- Production company: Netflix

Original release
- Network: Netflix
- Release: 16 August 2023 – present

At Home with the Furys is a British fly-on-the-wall television documentary series about two-time heavyweight boxing world champion Tyson Fury and his family. The first series was released by Netflix on 16 August 2023. Shortly after the first series aired, the series was renewed for a second series. In March 2026, ahead of the second season premiere, Netflix renewed the series for a third series.

== Premise ==
The series follows Tyson Fury as he exits the ring and tries to embrace retirement with his family including his wife Paris, father John, his seven children, and his half-brother Tommy.

The documentary deals with themes of grief, mental health, bipolar disorder, addiction, travellers, religion, coming-of-age and parenting.

It is filmed mostly on location in Morecambe, Lancashire and in Cheshire. Several episodes in the first series are filmed across Europe; Iceland, Cannes, Mallorca, London and the Isle of Man.

== Cast ==
- Tyson Fury
- Paris Fury
- John Fury
- Tommy Fury
- Molly-Mae Hague
- Jake Paul
- Derek Chisora

=== The children ===
- Venezuela Fury
- Prince John James Fury
- Prince Tyson ll Fury
- Valencia Fury
- Prince Adonis Fury
- Athena Fury
- Prince Rico Fury
- Bambi Fury

== Episodes ==
=== Series 1 (2023) ===
No.	Title	Original release date
1	"A Life Without Boxing"	16 August 2023
Three weeks after officially retiring from boxing, Tyson struggles to adjust to life outside the ring. His brother, Tommy Fury, makes a surprising announcement.
2	"A Giant Six Foot Nine Child"	16 August 2023
Tyson meets with fans and fields questions about his retirement during a tour to the Isle of Man. At home, Paris grills Venezuela about her ambitions.
3	"Picking A Fight With A Viking"	16 August 2023
Tyson, his father John and Paris open up about his ongoing struggles with mental health. Later, he flies to Iceland on a whim for an exhibition fight with strongman Hafþór Björnsson.
4	"Fighting Temptation"	16 August 2023
After a disastrous trip to Iceland, Paris throws Tyson a surprise party to cheer him up. Can he resist taking the bait when a new opponent taunts him?
5	"I'm Coming Home Baby!"	16 August 2023
Devastating news prompts Tyson to reconsider his life choices while on holiday in Mallorca. Mixed emotions brew when he decides to end his retirement.
6	"Will You Marry Me ... Again?!"	16 August 2023
Tyson sets his sights on boxing champion Anthony Joshua for his return to the ring. Later, he takes Paris to Cannes and stages a romantic surprise.
7	"D-Day for AJ"	16 August 2023
Tyson treats Venezuela to a father-daughter spa day for her birthday. Pressure mounts as he waits for Joshua to decide whether or not to fight him.
8	"Furious In Dubai"	16 August 2023
As he leaves for an intensive 8-week training camp, Tyson has an emotional goodbye with Paris and the kids. Drama flares ahead of Tommy's match in Dubai.
9	"This Game Could Be Over"	16 August 2023
Adrenaline and anxieties soar as Tyson's team and family watch him take on Derek Chisora, his longtime rival, during Fury's comeback fight in London.

=== Series 2 (2026) ===
No.	Title	Original release date
1	"I'm Back Baby"	12 April 2026
Tyson takes on round two of retirement and whisks Paris away on a kid-free trip from Morecambe to Monaco. Tommy opens up to John about personal struggles.
2	"I'm Gonna Tell You a Secret"	12 April 2026
As Paris opens up about past heartbreak on a girls' day, Tyson brings the boys back to basics on a camping trip – before a sparring session with Tommy.
3	"Everybody Wants a Piece of the GK"	12 April 2026
After grilling Venezuela about her career aspirations, a tartan-clad Tyson revels in his love for the limelight during a boys' road trip to Scotland.

== Reception ==
=== Critical response ===
==== Season 1 ====
The reviews were mostly favourable, with 73/100 rating on Rotten Tomatoes. Deborah Ross, a critic at The Mail on Sunday, described it as "reality TV gold" and gave the first season a 4/5 rating.

In a review for The Independent, Rachel McGrath noted that "it's not the heavyweight champ who is the breakout star". McGrath expanded on the idea that "Fury is our modern-day Ozzy – a man whose intense career couldn't be further from stay-at-home dad, now thrown into domestic life. His existence is one of wild juxtapositions." She gave the documentary a 3/5 rating.

In a more scathing review for The Guardian, Jack Seale gave the documentary a 2/5 rating, stating in article's foreword [...] "this sluggish celebrity family show is like Keeping Up With the Kardashians – but set in Morecambe. You can't blame Tyson for wanting to get back in the ring".

Two days after Netflix aired the 9-episode first series of the documentary, the BBC ran an article claiming that "critics praise mental health depiction in Netflix show". The article claims that "in a four-star review, the Evening Standard said: "There are too many silly moments to count, but there are also unexpectedly profound ones". The article references Rachel McGrath's review saying she "awarded the series three stars, writing: "Netflix don't seem to have realised that the lead star being bored isn't the best starting point for a series about family life."

In her four-star review, Carol Midgley of The Times suggested the show occasionally "feels scripted", noting the Furys know that "the cameras are on them and perhaps act up for them".

According to The Daily Telegraph's Anita Singh, generally the Furys "come across as a likeable couple". She gave the first season a 3/5 rating.
