= Awful Announcing =

Sports news website

- The logo for Awful Announcing
- Available in: English
- Owner: Ben Koo
- Creator: Brian Powell
- Website: www.awfulannouncing.com
- Commercial: Yes
- Launched: 2006
- Current status: Active

Awful Announcing (AA) is an American sports news website and blog. Founded in 2006 by Brian Powell, the platform focuses on sports media personalities, particularly broadcast announcers and television sportscasters. The platform has seven full-time staff in addition to a roster of part-time freelancers. The small crew of editors, writers, and social media creators work across multiple shifts throughout the day.

== History ==
A graduate of James Madison University (JMU), Brian Powell founded Awful Announcing in May 2006. Early in its history, Awful Announcing was a prominent outlet in the sports blogosphere. Powell noted that Spencer Tillman was an early critic of his blog. Bloguin Network acquired Awful Announcing in 2010; later in 2015, Comeback Media was spun out of Bloguin, becoming AA's parent company. Ben Koo took over as owner of Awful Announcing in 2010.

The website reports on news relating to sports announcing, broadcasting, and related media industry spaces. AA also conducts interviews with sports media executives. Their sharing of announcing audio has been cited to increase awareness of situations, such as when they wrote about West Virginia basketball coach Bob Huggins using a homophobic slur in a radio interview in 2023.

In April 2026, Awful Announcing announced a new partnership with Yahoo! to become part of a new sports business hub alongside Front Office Sports, Sportico, and Sports Business Journal.

== Citation and reception ==
AA's reporting has been cited by sports media websites such as ESPN and Fox Sports, as well as general news outlets like Forbes. ESPN has also issued statements via Awful Announcing.

Some sports announcers have commented on Awful Announcing. The book Those Guys Have All the Fun: Inside the World of ESPN (2011) quoted both Rece Davis and Bob Ley. Davis stated that sports announcers who "fall into reading" blogs like Awful Announcing and get upset or try to explain their mistakes pointed out by such blogs on-air "probably aren't doing [their] job as effectively as [they] ought to be". Meanwhile, Ley stated that he sometimes checks sports blogs like AA, as well as The Big Lead and Deadspin, likening visiting the blogs to "shopping in a discount store". Other sports media personalities have referenced Awful Announcing in their own writing, such as Bill Simmons in his Book of Basketball (2009) and Jemele Hill in her memoir, Uphill (2022).
