= Marcel Zeller =

German boxer (1973–2016)

Personal information
- Nickname: The Highlander
- Nationality: German
- Born: 3 August 1973 Essen, West Germany
- Died: 25 November 2016 (aged 43)
- Weight: Heavyweight

Boxing career
- Stance: Orthodox

Boxing record
- Total fights: 40
- Wins: 24
- Win by KO: 21
- Losses: 16
- Draws: 0
- No contests: 0

Marcel Zeller (3 August 1973 – 25 November 2016) was a German professional boxer.

Zeller was found dead in his apartment, from a suspected drug overdose on 25 November 2016.
