= Front Office Sports =

American sports news website

- Available in: English
- Creators: Adam White; Russell Wilde
- Editor: Dan Roberts (editor-in-chief)
- Website: www.frontofficesports.com
- Commercial: Yes
- Current status: Active

Front Office Sports, also branded by its acronym FOS, is an American news website centered around sports business.

== History ==
Front Office Sports is a media and news organization covering sports business topics, originally intended to create a newsletter network based around the business of sports. It was established by Adam White while he was a student at the University of Miami (UM). White has stated that the website has its origins rooted in a class project during his freshman year at UM, in 2014. (Note: While some sources cite 2013 as the organization's establishment, and others cite 2017, most sources cite 2014.) The following summer, White posted in a UM sport administration Facebook group asking if anyone wanted to be involved, with the only response coming from Russell Wilde, who is the organization's chief operating officer. The two run FOS from New York, with White serving as the organization's CEO.

By 2021, the website's newsletter had accumulated over 500,000 free subscribers. That year, the site rebranded as FOS, and began selling paid subscriptions. Also in 2021, FOS began working with Public, an investment app on the subscription product Insights, which was aimed at college students. Run by former Goldman Sachs banker Liam Killingstad, Insights was sold as a $50 per month subscription service.

In 2022, FOS raised $5 million from Crain Communications at around a $25 million valuation. The following year, former CNN executive Jeff Zucker acquired a stake in FOS and also bought out Crain's shares. In July 2024, FOS hired Dan Roberts as its editor-in-chief; Roberts previously served in the same role at Variant, an early stage venture fund, and Decrypt, a cryptocurrency news site.
