= Mike Tyson vs. Orlin Norris =

Boxing match

- Date: October 23, 1999
- Venue: MGM Grand Garden Arena, Paradise, Nevada

Tale of the tape
Boxer	Mike Tyson	Orlin Norris
Nickname	Iron	Night Train
Hometown	Catskill, New York	Houston, Texas
Pre-fight record	46–3 (40 KO)	50–5 (1) (27 KO)
Age	33 years, 3 months	34 years
Height	5 ft 10 in (178 cm)	5 ft 11 in (180 cm)
Weight	223 lb (101 kg)	218 lb (99 kg)
Style	Orthodox	Orthodox
Recognition	WBO; No. 1 Ranked Heavyweight; The Ring; No. 5 Ranked Heavyweight; Former undisputed heavyweight champion	WBO; No. 10 Ranked Heavyweight; Former cruiserweight champion

Result
- 1st-round no contest after Tyson committed a foul

Mike Tyson vs. Orlin Norris was a professional boxing match contested on October 23, 1999. The match was stopped and ruled a no contest before the second round after Tyson committed a foul, injuring Norris.

== Background ==
After a year-and-a-half long layoff, Mike Tyson made his long-anticipated return to boxing on January 16, 1999 against Francois Botha. Though Tyson appeared sluggish throughout the bout and trailed on all scorecards going into the fifth round, he was able to land a powerful right hand in the round that dropped Botha to the canvas. Botha attempted to get back up, but was unable to do so and Tyson escaped with the knockout victory. However, shortly after his victory over Botha, Tyson was convicted of assaulting two motorists in Indiana the year before and sentenced to one year in prison. Tyson would serve four months in prison before being paroled for good behavior on May 21 and then being officially released on June 4. After his release, Tyson began training in Arizona for the second fight in his comeback, which was scheduled to happen in the fall of 1999. Though several heavyweight contenders, including Michael Moorer, Shannon Briggs and Axel Schulz were brought up as possible opponents prior to Tyson's arrest, it was announced that former WBA Cruiserweight champion Orlin Norris would meet Tyson on October 23, 1999. 10 years prior, a then up-and-coming Norris had emerged as a contender to Tyson's Undisputed Heavyweight title, but Tyson's 1990 loss to James "Buster" Douglas prevented the match from happening and Norris moved down to the cruiserweight division shortly after. In 1996, Norris returned to the heavyweight division with a victory over former IBF Heavyweight champion Tony Tucker. Norris would then win his next two fights and was installed as the WBA's number two contender, however, a dispute with powerful boxing promoter Don King dropped him to the number six rank in the WBA's standings. After a successful lawsuit, Norris was promised a WBA "eliminator" fight against Henry Akinwande, which took place in December 1997, but Norris lost both the fight and the chance to face then-WBA champion Evander Holyfield. Though the 34–year old Norris was well past his prime by the time of his fight with Tyson, he nevertheless regarded the bout as a "big opportunity" and remained confident that he could defeat Tyson and gain his long-awaited shot at one of the major heavyweight titles in the process.

== The fight ==
The fight would only last one round. Tyson was clearly the aggressor for the fight's first and only round, constantly having Norris on the defensive and throwing several power punches during the round. Norris offered little offense during the round, only landing a few jabs while mostly attempting to avoid trading blows with the stronger Tyson. At the very end of the round, Tyson and Norris were engaged in a clinch. Just after the bell sounded, Tyson landed a left hand that dropped Norris to the mat. As a result, referee Richard Steele deducted two points from Tyson on the judge's official scorecards. Both Norris and Tyson then proceeded to their respective corners, but after the bell rang to signify the start of the second round, Norris remained seated on a stool in his corner as Steele granted him extra time. Norris then notified the official ringside doctor Flip Homansky that he had injured his knee following the fall and as a result, could not continue with the fight, which was stopped and ruled a no-contest. A disappointed Tyson had to be restrained by his corner from confronting Norris.

== Aftermath ==
Tyson accused Norris of faking his knee injury in order to get out of the fight without recording an official loss and publicly announced his intentions to meet Norris in a rematch in December of that same year. Norris, however, maintained his innocence, stating that he "just went down the wrong way on my right knee." Because of his illegal punch, Tyson's $8.7 million purse was temporarily withheld from him by the Nevada State Athletic Commission as they reviewed whether or not he had intentionally hit Norris after the bell, but they chose not to punish him further and granted him his full purse only a week after the fight. Tyson then chose not to proceed with a rematch with Norris and instead agreed to face British journeyman Julius Francis in Manchester in January 2000. Norris then filed a $2 million lawsuit against Tyson, claiming that Tyson had broken an agreement that the two had made for the rematch in which Norris was reportedly promised a $2 million payday. However, Norris's request was denied by a Manhattan judge who stated that he did not think Norris' argument would prevail in court.

== Undercard ==
Confirmed bouts:

== Broadcasting ==
Country	Broadcaster
Australia	Sky Channel
United States	Showtime

Preceded by vs. Francois Botha	Mike Tyson's bouts 23 October 1999	Succeeded by vs. Julius Francis
Preceded by vs. Pelé Reid	Orlin Norris's bouts 23 October 1999	Succeeded by vs. Andrew Golota
