= Mike Tyson vs. Julius Francis =

Boxing competition

- Date: 29 January 2000
- Venue: Manchester Arena, Manchester, UK

Tale of the tape
Boxer	(United States) Mike Tyson	(United Kingdom) Julius Francis
Nickname	"Iron"	
Hometown	Catskill, New York, US	Peckham, London, UK
Purse		£350,000
Pre-fight record	46–3 (1) (40 KO)	21–7 (11 KO)
Age	33 years, 6 months	35 years, 1 month
Height	5 ft 10 in (178 cm)	6 ft 2 in (188 cm)
Weight	223 lb (101 kg)	244 lb (111 kg)
Style	Orthodox	Orthodox
Recognition	WBO; No. 1 Ranked Heavyweight; Former undisputed heavyweight champion	WBC; No. 12 Ranked Heavyweight; British; Heavyweight Champion

Result
- Tyson wins via 2nd-round TKO

Mike Tyson vs. Julius Francis was a professional boxing match contested on 29 January 2000.

== Background ==
Tyson's previous fight had come against Orlin Norris three months prior. The fight was another controversial one for Tyson, who hit Norris with left hand after the first bell had rung that dropped him to the canvas. Norris fell awkwardly and injured his right knee in the process and decided that he could not continue on with the fight, which was then declared a no-contest after only one round. Originally, Tyson stated that he would be in favor of a rematch with Norris in December of that year, but Tyson instead chose to face British journeyman Julius Francis in what would be his first fight in Europe and his first outside the United States since his 1990 loss to James "Buster" Douglas. However, Tyson's impending arrival in England caused a stir, as his 1992 rape conviction led to concern as to whether or not Tyson would be allowed into the country. The issue was brought to the Home Office, a department of the U.K. government that is responsible for immigration and security, and on 13 January 2000 the head of the department, Home Secretary Jack Straw, announced his decision to allow Tyson into the country, stating that he "did not want to hurt the businesses in Manchester that were expecting a windfall from the fight or disappoint the fans who had bought tickets." Several of Britain's top politicians criticized Straw's decision, including Trevor Phillips who accused Straw of "caving in" and "ignoring the law." Tyson officially arrived in England on 16 January 2000, where he was met with protests from the feminist women's group, Justice For Women, who hoped to have the decision to allow Tyson in England overturned. Tyson would lash out at his protesters, calling the group "just a bunch of frustrated women who want to be men." Tyson's opponent Julius Francis was installed as a 16–1 underdog going into the fight. Francis was recognized as the British Heavyweight Champion, but came into the fight with an unimpressive 21–7 record, having lost to several heavyweight contenders in the years before his fight with Tyson, including John Ruiz, Željko Mavrović and Vitali Klitschko. Nevertheless, Francis maintained that he and Lennox Lewis were the only two British boxers who were worthy enough to face Tyson.

== The fight ==
Tyson would dominate the fight, gaining five knockdowns over Francis in a span of four minutes. The first knockdown came with 45 seconds left in the first round. After being backed into the ropes, Francis attempted to throw a right hand, but the attempt missed and Tyson landed a right uppercut that sent Francis down. Francis remained on his knees before finally getting back up at the count of nine. Tyson responded by throwing three consecutive power punches in an attempt to gain the knockout victory, but the punches missed and Francis quickly clinched with Tyson in an effort to slow Tyson down. The two were separated with 15 seconds left and Tyson continued his attack and was able to gain a second knockdown just before the round ended with a quick left hand, but Francis was able to get back up at the count of 7. As the second round began, Tyson continued his assault on Francis and was able to gain a third knockdown less than 20 seconds into the round. Francis again got back up but was knocked down again only seconds later by a left uppercut. Though he was clearly hurt, Francis got up for the fourth time but Tyson quickly ended the fight after another right uppercut sent Francis down. Following the fifth knockdown, referee Roy Francis immediately stopped the fight and Tyson was awarded the knockout victory at 58 second of the second round.

== Aftermath ==
Less than two months later, an uninterested Francis was back in the ring and lost his British title on a close decision to Michael Holden, whom he had already beaten.

== Undercard ==
Confirmed bouts:

== Broadcasting ==
Country	Broadcaster
Australia	Main Event
United Kingdom	Sky Sports
United States	Showtime

Preceded by vs. Orlin Norris	Mike Tyson's bouts 29 January 2000	Succeeded by vs. Lou Savarese
Preceded by vs. Scott Welch	Julius Francis's bouts 29 January 2000	Succeeded by vs. Mike Holden
