= Lennox Lewis vs. Andrew Golota =

Boxing match

The Bigger They Are, The Harder They Brawl
- Date: October 4, 1997
- Venue: Convention Center in Atlantic City, New Jersey, U.S.
- Title(s) on the line: WBC heavyweight title

Tale of the tape
Boxer	Lennox Lewis	Andrew Golota
Nickname	The Lion	
Hometown	London, England	Warsaw, Poland
Purse	$4,000,000	$1,750,000
Pre-fight record	31–1 (25 KO)	28–2 (25 KO)
Age	32 years, 1 month	29 years, 8 months
Height	6 ft 5 in (196 cm)	6 ft 4 in (193 cm)
Weight	244 lb (111 kg)	244 lb (111 kg)
Style	Orthodox	Orthodox
Recognition	WBC; Heavyweight Champion; The Ring; No. 2 Ranked Heavyweight	WBC; No. 1 Ranked Heavyweight; The Ring; No. 4 Ranked Heavyweight

Result
- Lewis wins via first-round knockout

Lennox Lewis vs. Andrew Golota, billed as The Bigger They Are, The Harder They Brawl, was a professional boxing match contested on October 4, 1997, for the WBC Heavyweight Championship.

== Background ==
After making the first successful defense in his second reign as WBC Heavyweight champion against the previously undefeated Henry Akinwande, Lennox Lewis agreed to make his second defense against controversial Polish fighter Andrew Golota. Golota was coming off two consecutive disqualification losses to Riddick Bowe. Golota had dominated the action in both fights and lead on all of the judge's scorecards before landing multiple low blows on Bowe that caused the referee to stop the fight both times. Initially, Golota was to face Olympic Gold Medalist Ray Mercer after his second fight with Bowe, but a neck injury forced Mercer to forgo the match and Golota was able to come to an agreement for a title fight with Lewis instead. Prior to the bout, Lewis' manager Frank Maloney accused Golota of steroid use and asked that he be tested for banned substances, but Golota was found to be clean.

== The fight ==
Though it was thought that the match would be a back-and-forth contest between two of boxing's top heavyweights, it instead became one of the most lopsided championship fights in the sport's history. As soon as the fight started, Lewis had Golota on the defensive by effectively using his strong left jab and as the first minute of the fight came to close, was able to land a powerful right hook that stunned Golota and sent him into the corner. With Golota's back now against the turnbuckle, Lewis proceeded to land a six-punch combination that sent Golota to the canvas. Golota was able to back up, but was clearly hurt from the exchange and had trouble finding his balance. Nevertheless, referee Joe Cortez allowed Golota to continue the fight but he was quickly met with a furious assault from Lewis, who landed an over 10-punch combination that again sent Golota down. Cortez quickly stopped the fight and Lewis was named the winner by knockout after only 95 seconds of action.

== Aftermath ==
Golota was injected with lidocaine, a powerful painkiller, before the bout in an attempt to stave off knee pain. Golota had a seizure in the locker room about 15 minutes after the bout ended, during which he stopped breathing and was without a pulse for about 30 seconds. After being revived by cardiopulmonary resuscitation and rushed to the hospital, Golota's condition was upgraded to stable and he eventually made a full recovery. Golota was fined $5,000 for allowing the lidocaine injection. Golota filed a $21 million lawsuit against the doctor who administered the shot. The case was settled out of court for around $1 million.

== Undercard ==
Confirmed bouts: GATTI VS RUELAS

== Broadcasting ==
Country	Broadcaster
Canada	TSN
France	Canal+
Poland	HBO
United Kingdom	Sky Sports
United States	HBO

Preceded by vs. Henry Akinwande	Lennox Lewis's bouts 4 October 1997	Succeeded by vs. Shannon Briggs
Preceded by vs. Riddick Bowe II	Andrew Golota's bouts 4 October 1997	Succeeded by vs. Eli Dixon
