= Lennox Lewis vs. Henry Akinwande =

Boxing competition

- Date: July 12, 1997
- Venue: Caesars Tahoe, Stateline, Nevada, U.S.
- Title(s) on the line: WBC Heavyweight Championship

Tale of the tape
Boxer	Lennox Lewis	Henry Akinwande
Nickname	The Lion	
Hometown	London, England	London, England
Purse	$5,200,000	$1,000,000
Pre-fight record	30–1 (25 KO)	32–0–1 (19 KO)
Age	31 years, 10 months	31 years, 9 months
Height	6 ft 5 in (196 cm)	6 ft 7 in (201 cm)
Weight	242 lb (110 kg)	237 1/2 lb (108 kg)
Style	Orthodox	Orthodox
Recognition	WBC; Heavyweight Champion	WBC; No. 1 Ranked Heavyweight

Result
- Lewis wins via fifth-round disqualification

Lennox Lewis vs. Henry Akinwande was a professional boxing match contested on July 12, 1997, for the WBC Heavyweight Championship.

== Background ==
On February 7, 1997, Lennox Lewis and Oliver McCall had a rematch to determine who would become the next WBC Heavyweight Champion, as the title had been vacated by previous champion Mike Tyson after Tyson chose not to face Lewis, who was the mandatory challenger. In one of the strangest fights in boxing history, McCall refused to fight in rounds 4 and 5, causing referee Mills Lane to stop the fight and award Lewis the victory by technical knockout. For his first defense of his second reign as champion, Lewis was matched up against fellow British fighter Henry Akinwande, who was undefeated in his professional career. At the time the fight was made, Akinwande also held the then lightly regarded WBO Heavyweight title, but he was forced to vacate the title in order to proceed with his championship match with Lewis. Initially, the fight was going to be held in Atlantic City, but the fight was moved to Stateline, Nevada, due to Akinwande's promoter Don King being banned from Atlantic City because of legal troubles. This was only the second time that two British boxers had fought each other for a world heavyweight title, the first being when Lewis fought Frank Bruno in 1993.

== The fight ==
Akinwande did not offer much offense throughout the fight, instead constantly clinching Lewis whenever Lewis appeared to be getting the better of the fight. Referee Mills Lane warned Akinwande several times and even deducted a point from him in the second round due to his excessive holding, but Akinwande nevertheless continued to use the illegal tactic through the course of the bout. Finally, after a 19-second hold that Akinwande refused to relinquish, Lane stopped the fight with 26 seconds to go in the fifth round and disqualified Akinwande, giving Lewis the victory in the process. For Lane it was his second consecutive heavyweight championship fight that ended in disqualification, as less than 3 weeks prior, he was forced to disqualify Mike Tyson after he twice bit Evander Holyfield on the ears during the very famous Holyfield–Tyson II match.

== Aftermath ==
Because of his poor performance, the Nevada Athletic Commission withheld Akinwande's $1 million purse, and due to a law that was passed after the controversial Holyfield–Tyson rematch, could now take the entire amount of his purse rather than just 10 percent of it. Ultimately, the commission decided that he had been punished enough by his DQ loss and allowed Akinwande to keep the full amount of his purse. Akinwande then closed 1997 with a defeat of Orlin Norris and landed a WBA title shot against Holyfield the following year. However, before Akinwande could get his shot at redemption, he was diagnosed with hepatitis B and the match was called off. After a year-long absence, Akinwande returned in 1999 and proceeded to climb the heavyweight rankings by winning his next seven fights. However, his comeback came to an abrupt halt after a knockout loss to Oliver McCall in 2001.

== Undercard ==
Confirmed bouts:

- Justin Juuko vs. Jorge Luis Lopez
- Brian Nielsen vs. Marcos Gonzalez
- Fernando Vargas vs. Eugene Lopez
- Joel Casamayor vs. Salvador Montes
- Richard Davis vs. Glenn Liechti

== Broadcasting ==
Country	Broadcaster
United Kingdom	Sky Sports
United States	HBO

Preceded by vs. Oliver McCall II	Lennox Lewis's bouts 12 July 1997	Succeeded by vs. Andrew Golota
Preceded by vs. Scott Welch	Henry Akinwande's bouts 12 July 1997	Succeeded by vs. Orlin Norris
