= Mike Tyson vs. Lou Savarese =

Boxing competition

Tyson's Back
- Date: 24 June 2000
- Venue: Hampden Park, Glasgow, Scotland

Tale of the tape
Boxer	Mike Tyson	Lou Savarese
Nickname	Iron	
Hometown	Catskill, New York, U.S.	Houston, Texas, U.S.
Purse	$8,000,000	$900,000
Pre-fight record	47–3 (1) (41 KO)	39–3 (32 KO)
Age	33 years, 11 months	34 years, 11 months
Height	5 ft 10 in (178 cm)	6 ft 5 in (196 cm)
Weight	222 lb (101 kg)	241 1/4 lb (109 kg)
Style	Orthodox	Orthodox
Recognition	WBO; No. 1 Ranked Heavyweight; WBA; No. 4 Ranked Heavyweight; IBF; No. 8 Ranked Heavyweight; Former undisputed heavyweight champion	WBC; No. 17 Ranked Heavyweight

Result
- Tyson wins via first-round technical knockout

Mike Tyson vs. Lou Savarese, billed as Tyson's Back, was a professional boxing match contested on June 24, 2000.

== Background ==
Mike Tyson embarked on a comeback in 1999, marking his return to the ring after a nine-month hiatus, primarily due to a four-month prison sentence. His comeback journey began with a victory on January 16, 1999, when he knocked out former world title challenger Francois Botha in the fifth round. Following this, Tyson faced former WBA Cruiserweight champion Orlin Norris, but their bout ended in a no-contest due to an accidental punch that landed after the bell.

Three months later, Tyson had his first-ever fight in the United Kingdom, defeating British journeyman Julius Francis by a second-round knockout. In February 2000, Tyson announced his next opponent, fringe contender Lou Savarese. Initially slated for Milan in May, the bout was postponed after Tyson reportedly needed more time to train. The fight was then moved to Hampden Park in Glasgow, and rescheduled for 24 June. The decision to allow Tyson back into the United Kingdom sparked protests due to his prior rape conviction, but Glasgow City Council ultimately voted 10–1 in favor of permitting the match to proceed.

== The fights ==
=== Undercard ===
The undercard saw Commonwealth heavyweight champion Danny Williams stop Craig Bowen Price in the 1st round. Adam Watt defeat Bruce Scott by 4th round stoppage to win the vacant Commonwealth cruiserweight title.

Former WBC super middleweight champion Robin Reid made his return to ring to the ring after 16 months, following his split decision loss to Joe Calzaghe, against Silvio Branco. Branco would upset Reid with a unanimous decision victory.

=== Judah vs. Witter ===
Tyson's Back: Zab Judah vs. Junior Witter
- Title on the line: IBF light welterweight title

Tale of the tape
Boxer	(United States) Zab Judah	(United Kingdom) Junior Witter
Nickname	"Super"	"The Hitter"
Hometown	Brownsville, New York, U.S.	Bradford, West Yorkshire, UK
Pre-fight record	23–0 (1) (17 KO)	15–0–2 (4 KO)
Age	22 years, 7 months	26 years, 3 months
Height	5 ft 7 in (170 cm)	5 ft 7 in (170 cm)
Weight	139 3/4 lb (63 kg)	139 1/4 lb (63 kg)
Style	Southpaw	Orthodox
Recognition	IBF; Light Welterweight Champion	Former WBF light welterweight champion

Result
- Judah defeats Witter by unanimous decision

In the chief support, IBF light welterweight champion Zab Judah faced late replacement Junior Witter. Judah was originally set to face British light welterweight champion (and IBF 5th ranked) Jason Rowland however he was forced to pull out after one of his pitbull terriers bit off part of his left index finger.

==== The fight ====
It would prove to be an awkward fight for Judah, as Witter rarely engaged in an extended exchange of punches. The challenger would also frequently switch between fighting right-handed and left-handed, making him an elusive opponent. Judah's consistent body punching slowed Witter down, and in the fifth round, Judah caught Witter with a straight left hand that hurt Witter and sent his mouthpiece skittering across the ring.

The fight went the full 12 rounds, where Judah defeated Witter by unanimous decision. the scorecards reading 116–112, 118–111 and 118–110.

Preceded by vs. Jan Piet Bergman	Zab Judah's bouts 24 June 2000	Succeeded by vs. Terron Millett
Preceded by vs. Arv Mittoo	Junior Witter's bouts 24 June 2000	Succeeded by vs. Steve Conway

=== Main Event ===
In the bout with Savarese, Tyson made a swift impact with a left hand that sent Savarese to the canvas. Savarese managed to rise but faced a relentless onslaught from Tyson. Referee John Coyle attempted to intervene at 26 seconds, but Tyson continued to attack, even briefly taking down Coyle. Tyson's corner eventually entered the ring, and he regained his composure. The fight was declared a technical knockout victory for Tyson after only 38 seconds of action. It was the second quickest fight of his career, behind only his 30-second victory over Marvis Frazier in 1986.

== Aftermath ==
During his post-fight interview with Jim Gray of Showtime, Tyson called out Lennox Lewis, stating, "I was gonna rip his heart out. I'm the best ever. I'm the most brutal and vicious, the most ruthless champion there has ever been. No one can stop me. Lennox is a conqueror? No! He's no Alexander! I'm Alexander! I'm the best ever. I'm Sonny Liston. I'm Jack Dempsey. There's never been anyone like me. I'm from their cloth. There is no one who can match me. My style is impetuous, my defense is impregnable, and I'm just ferocious. I want your heart! I want to eat his children! Praise to Allah."

== Undercard ==
Confirmed bouts:

== Broadcasting ==
Country	Broadcaster
Australia	Main Event
United Kingdom	Sky Sports
United States	Showtime

Preceded by vs. Julius Francis	Mike Tyson's bouts 24 June 2000	Succeeded by vs. Andrew Golota
Preceded by vs. Michael Grant	Lou Savarese's bouts 24 June 2000	Succeeded by vs. Marcus Rhode
