= 1982 Thomas Cup =

Tournament details
- Dates: 10 – 21 May 1982
- Edition: 12th
- Level: International
- Nations: 6
- Venue: 5 (in 5 host cities)

The 1982 Thomas Cup was the 12th tournament of Thomas Cup, the most important men's badminton team competition in the world. The final round was held in London, England. China won its first title after beating Indonesia in the final round.

== Host selection ==
On 24 July 1981, the International Badminton Federation announced that England was chosen to host the 1982 Thomas Cup after a badminton showcase. Throughout the competition, five venues in five respective cities staged the matches for the first round, the second round and the challenge round.

== Qualification ==
26 teams from 4 regions took part in the competition. As defending champion, Indonesia skipped the qualifications and the first round, and played directly in the second round at the inter-zone Ties.

Means of qualification	Date	Venue	Slot	Qualified teams
Host country	24 July 1981	England	1	England
1979 Thomas Cup	24 May – 2 June 1979	Jakarta	1	Indonesia
Asian Zone	2 October 1981 – 5 March 1982	Bangkok; Beijing; Hyderabad; Taipei	1	China
American Zone	24 October 1981 – 4 April 1982	Claremont; Lima; Kitchener; Pomona; San Diego	1	Japan
European Zone	30 October 1981 – 18 February 1982	Copenhagen; Duisburg; Grangemouth; Haarlem; Pressbaum	1	Denmark
Australasian Zone	4–8 August 1981	Hamilton	1	Malaysia
Total			6	

== Venues ==
Five venues in five cities were selected to host the tournament. The first two matches in the first round were staged in Huddersfield and Gloucester. The second round matches were hosted in Birmingham and Preston, Lancashire. The Challenge round was staged at the Royal Albert Hall in London.

First round	Second round	1982 Thomas Cup is located in England
Denmark vs Japan	Indonesia vs England	1982 Thomas Cup is located in England
Huddersfield	Birmingham	1982 Thomas Cup is located in England
Huddersfield Sports Centre	Aston Villa Leisure and Sports Centre	1982 Thomas Cup is located in England
Malaysia vs England	Denmark vs China	1982 Thomas Cup is located in England
Gloucester	Preston	1982 Thomas Cup is located in England
Gloucester Leisure Centre	Preston Guild Hall	1982 Thomas Cup is located in England
Challenge round		1982 Thomas Cup is located in England
Indonesia vs China		1982 Thomas Cup is located in England
London		1982 Thomas Cup is located in England
Royal Albert Hall		1982 Thomas Cup is located in England

== Knockout stage ==
The following teams, shown by region, qualified for the 1982 Thomas Cup. Defending champion Indonesia automatically qualified to defend their title.

=== Bracket ===
First round
Indonesia
Bye
10 May 1982 – Gloucester
England	5
Malaysia	4
12 May 1982 – Huddersfield
Denmark	5
Japan	4
Bye
China

Second round
14 May 1982 – Birmingham
Indonesia	8
England	1
16 May 1982 – Preston
Denmark	1
China	8

Challenge round
20 May 1982 – London
Indonesia	4
China	5

=== First round ===
10 May 1982
11 May 1982

Denmark	5–4	Japan
Report

Huddersfield Sports Centre, Huddersfield

12 May 1982
13 May 1982

Malaysia	4–5	England
Report

Gloucester Leisure Centre, Gloucester

=== Second round ===
14 May 1982
15 May 1982

Denmark	1–8	China
Report

Preston Guild Hall, Preston

16 May 1982
17 May 1982

Indonesia	8–1	England
Report

Aston Villa Leisure and Sports Centre, Birmingham

=== Final ===
20 May 1982
21 May 1982

Indonesia	4–5	China
Report

Royal Albert Hall, London

1982 Thomas Cup winner

China
First title
