= 1982 Thomas Cup knockout stage =

Badminton tournament

The knockout stage for the 1982 Thomas Cup began on 10 May 1982 with the first-round knockout and ended on 21 May with the final tie.

== Qualified teams ==
The teams that won their zonal tie qualified for the final knockout stage.

Group	Winners
H	England
CH	Indonesia
AS	China
AM	Japan
AU	Malaysia
EU	Denmark

== Bracket ==
First round
Indonesia
Bye
10 May 1982 – Gloucester
England	5
Malaysia	4
12 May 1982 – Huddersfield
Denmark	5
Japan	4
Bye
China

Second round
14 May 1982 – Birmingham
Indonesia	8
England	1
16 May 1982 – Preston
Denmark	1
China	8

Challenge round
20 May 1982 – London
Indonesia	4
China	5

== First round ==
Denmark faced Japan in the first match of the 1982 Thomas Cup, which was taken place at the Huddersfield Sports Centre in Huddersfield. Japan won the first point when Kinji Zeniya defeated Steen Fladberg 1–15, 15–9, 15–5. Denmark later equalized the score when Claus Andersen defeated Hiroyuki Hasegawa 15–9, 15–2 in the second singles match. The first doubles went Japan's way after Steen Skovgaard and Flemming Delfs lost to Masao Tsuchida and Shokichi Miyamori 10–15, 8–15. Both teams tied at 2–2 on the first day. On the second day of the competition, both teams won and conceded a point in the crossover singles. The third singles match saw Flemming Delfs defeat Masao Tsuchida 15–11, 15–8 to give Denmark a 4–3 advantage. In the first of the two crossover doubles, Steen Skovgaard and Flemming Delfs earned Denmark's winning point by defeating Nobutaka Ikeda and Toshihiro Tsuji. The final score was 5–4, with Japan winning the second crossover doubles match.

The other half of the first round saw Malaysia go against hosts England at the Gloucester Leisure Centre in Gloucester. Both teams drew 2–2 on the first day, with both Malaysia and England winning a match in singles and doubles. On the second day of the tie, Malaysia gained a 3–2 lead when Razif Sidek defeated Ray Stevens in three hard-fought games. However, the lead did not last long when Steve Baddeley gave a surprising result by defeating Misbun Sidek 15–0, 15–7 in a match which lasted 18 minutes. Tables were turned after the hosts took a 4–3 advantage over Malaysia with Nick Yates's win against Saw Swee Leong 15–9, 15–5. Malaysia then equalized the score by winning the first crossover doubles and it all came down to the second crossover doubles to determine which team will advance to the next round. Duncan Bridge and Martin Dew of England took the first game 15–12 against Malaysia's Misbun Sidek and Ong Beng Teong. In the second game, the English pair won 15–7 and earned the deciding point for England. This marked the first time England reached the final four of the Thomas Cup since the inaugural tournament in 1949.

=== Denmark vs Japan ===
Denmark
5
Huddersfield Sports Centre
10–11 May 1982

Japan
4

			1	2	3
1	(Denmark) (Japan)	Steen Fladberg; Kinji Zeniya	15; 1	9; 15	5; 15
2	(Denmark) (Japan)	Claus Andersen; Hiroyuki Hasegawa	15; 9	15; 2
3	(Denmark) (Japan)	Steen Skovgaard / Flemming Delfs; Masao Tsuchida / Shokichi Miyamori	10; 15	8; 15
4	(Denmark) (Japan)	Jesper Helledie / Steen Fladberg; Nobutaka Ikeda / Toshihiro Tsuji	12; 15	15; 8	15; 11
5	(Denmark) (Japan)	Steen Fladberg; Hiroyuki Hasegawa	15; 5	17; 18	15; 5
6	(Denmark) (Japan)	Claus Andersen; Kinji Zeniya	15; 11	13; 15	12; 15
7	(Denmark) (Japan)	Flemming Delfs; Masao Tsuchida	15; 11	15; 8
8	(Denmark) (Japan)	Steen Skovgaard / Flemming Delfs; Nobutaka Ikeda / Toshihiro Tsuji	15; 5	15; 6
9	(Denmark) (Japan)	Jesper Helledie / Steen Fladberg; Masao Tsuchida / Shokichi Miyamori	11; 15	11; 15

=== Malaysia vs England ===
Malaysia
4
Gloucester Leisure Centre
12–13 May 1982

England
5

			1	2	3
1	(Malaysia) (England)	Misbun Sidek; Nick Yates	8; 15	15; 13	15; 9
2	(Malaysia) (England)	Saw Swee Leong; Steve Baddeley	6; 15	10; 15
3	(Malaysia) (England)	Misbun Sidek / Ong Beng Teong; Ray Stevens / Mike Tredgett	12; 15	2; 15
4	(Malaysia) (England)	Jalani Sidek / Razif Sidek; Duncan Bridge / Martin Dew	12; 15	15; 11	15; 6
5	(Malaysia) (England)	Razif Sidek; Ray Stevens	9; 15	15; 11	18; 16
6	(Malaysia) (England)	Misbun Sidek; Steve Baddeley	0; 15	7; 15
7	(Malaysia) (England)	Saw Swee Leong; Nick Yates	9; 15	5; 15
8	(Malaysia) (England)	Jalani Sidek / Razif Sidek; Ray Stevens / Mike Tredgett	15; 3	15; 8
9	(Malaysia) (England)	Misbun Sidek / Ong Beng Teong; Duncan Bridge / Martin Dew	12; 15	7; 15

== Second round ==
The play between Denmark and China was held at the Preston Guild Hall. China showed dominance on the first day by winning a 3–1 lead. Denmark earned their only point in the first doubles when Steen Skovgaard and Flemming Delfs defeated the 1981 World Games men's doubles champions, Sun Zhian and Yao Ximing 15–9, 6–15, 15–9. On the second day of the tie, China continued their run and won all five matches to defeat Denmark 8–1 for a place in the Thomas Cup final.

Indonesia went head to head against hosts England at the Aston Villa Leisure and Sports Centre. Approximately 2,000 spectators attended the venue to watch the match. Indonesia started with a 4–0 lead against England, winning both singles and doubles. On the second day, Liem Swie King won his match against Nick Yates and delivered the winning point for Indonesia. England's only victory in this tie came from the final doubles match when Martin Dew and Mike Tredgett defeated Rudy Heryanto and Kartono 15–10, 15–1.

=== Denmark vs China ===
Denmark
1
Preston Guild Hall
14–15 May 1982

China
8

			1	2	3
1	(Denmark) (China)	Steen Fladberg; Han Jian	12; 15	1; 15
2	(Denmark) (China)	Claus Andersen; Chen Changjie	8; 15	16; 17
3	(Denmark) (China)	Steen Skovgaard / Flemming Delfs; Sun Zhian / Yao Ximing	15; 9	6; 15	15; 9
4	(Denmark) (China)	Jesper Helledie / Steen Fladberg; Luan Jin / Lin Jiangli	5; 15	16; 18
5	(Denmark) (China)	Claus Andersen; Han Jian	3; 15	7; 15
6	(Denmark) (China)	Steen Fladberg; Chen Changjie	5; 15	15; 12	8; 15
7	(Denmark) (China)	Flemming Delfs; Luan Jin	7; 15	4; 15
8	(Denmark) (China)	Jesper Helledie / Steen Fladberg; Sun Zhian / Yao Ximing	6; 15	1; 15
9	(Denmark) (China)	Steen Skovgaard / Flemming Delfs; Luan Jin / Lin Jiangli	9; 15	4; 15

=== Indonesia vs England ===
Indonesia
8
Aston Villa Leisure and Sports Centre
16–17 May 1982

England
1

			1	2	3
1	(Indonesia) (England)	Liem Swie King; Steve Baddeley	11; 15	15; 0	15; 9
2	(Indonesia) (England)	Lius Pongoh; Nick Yates	18; 17	15; 7
3	(Indonesia) (England)	Christian Hadinata / Liem Swie King; Martin Dew / Mike Tredgett	15; 10	15; 5
4	(Indonesia) (England)	Rudy Heryanto / Kartono; Andy Goode / Ray Stevens	15; 2	2; 15	15; 5
5	(Indonesia) (England)	Liem Swie King; Nick Yates	15; 2	15; 5
6	(Indonesia) (England)	Lius Pongoh; Steve Baddeley	15; 12	15; 8
7	(Indonesia) (England)	Rudy Hartono; Andy Goode	15; 4	18; 14
8	(Indonesia) (England)	Christian Hadinata / Liem Swie King; Andy Goode / Nick Yates	17; 18	15; 11	15; 6
9	(Indonesia) (England)	Rudy Heryanto / Kartono; Martin Dew / Mike Tredgett	10; 15	1; 15

== Challenge round ==
The grand finale of the 1982 Thomas Cup was held at the Royal Albert Hall in London with an attendance of 6,000 spectators. The final was also attended by Queen Elizabeth II and Prince Philip. This was the first time both teams faced each other in the Thomas Cup. On the first day, Liem Swie King delivered Indonesia's first point when he beat Chen Changjie of China 15–8, 15–13. Han Jian help deliver the equalizer when he defeated Lius Pongoh 15–5, 15–7 in the second singles match. Indonesia won their second point when Rudy Heryanto and Kartono defeated Lin Jiangli and Luan Jin 15–8, 13–15, 15–9 in the first doubles. The second doubles match also went Indonesia's way when men's doubles ace Christian Hadinata partnered with Swie King to defeat Sun Zhian and Yao Ximing, giving Indonesia a 3–1 lead against China.

On the second day, China's Luan Jin was up against eight-time All England champion, Rudy Hartono. The 32-year-old Rudy, despite flashes of the old brilliance, found that Luan Jin was just too fast and hard-hitting and lost the match in three games. After the match, the crowd saluted the former All England champion as this was his last match in international badminton. In the first of the crossover singles match, Han Jian helped to deliver another equalizer after he defeated Liem Swie King in three games to put China 3–3 against Indonesia. China gained a 4–3 lead against Indonesia when Chen Changjie defeated Lius Pongoh in the second crossover singles match. Indonesia's Thomas Cup title was in jeopardy as China only needed one point to take the title. In the first doubles crossover match, Sun Zhian and Yao Ximing won the first game Rudy Heryanto and Kartono 17–14. In the second game, the Chinese pair lost 3–15 to the Indonesians. The Chinese pair won the third game 15–1 and earned China's winning point, thus bringing Indonesia's Thomas Cup supremacy to an end.

=== Indonesia vs China ===
Indonesia
4
Royal Albert Hall
20–21 May 1982

China
5

			1	2	3
1	(Indonesia) (China)	Liem Swie King; Chen Changjie	15; 8	15; 13
2	(Indonesia) (China)	Lius Pongoh; Han Jian	5; 15	7; 15
3	(Indonesia) (China)	Rudy Heryanto / Kartono; Lin Jiangli / Luan Jin	15; 8	13; 15	15; 9
4	(Indonesia) (China)	Christian Hadinata / Liem Swie King; Sun Zhian / Yao Ximing	15; 10	12; 15	15; 8
5	(Indonesia) (China)	Rudy Hartono; Luan Jin	9; 15	15; 1	9; 15
6	(Indonesia) (China)	Liem Swie King; Han Jian	12; 15	15; 11	14; 17
7	(Indonesia) (China)	Lius Pongoh; Chen Changjie	17; 18	12; 15
8	(Indonesia) (China)	Rudy Heryanto / Kartono; Sun Zhian / Yao Ximing	14; 17	15; 3	1; 15
9	(Indonesia) (China)	Christian Hadinata / Liem Swie King; Lin Jiangli / Luan Jin	15; 4	15; 11
