= Matt Skelton =

English kickboxer, boxer and mixed martial arts fighter

- Born: 27 January 1967 (age 59); Bedford, England
- Other names: The Bedford Banger; The Bedford Bear
- Nationality: British
- Height: 6 ft 3 in (191 cm)
- Weight: 100 kg (220 lb; 15 st 10 lb)
- Division: Heavyweight
- Reach: 80 in (203 cm)
- Style: MMA; Boxing, Kickboxing, Muay thai
- Stance: Orthodox
- Team: Team Skelton
- Years active: 2001 (MMA); 1998–2002 (kickboxing); 2002–2014 (boxing)

Professional boxing record
- Total: 37
- Wins: 28
- By knockout: 23
- Losses: 9
- By knockout: 5

Kickboxing record
- Total: 71
- Wins: 63
- By knockout: 57
- Losses: 8
- By knockout: 3

Mixed martial arts record
- Total: 1
- Wins: 0
- Losses: 1
- By submission: 1

Other information
- Boxing record from BoxRec
- Mixed martial arts record from Sherdog
- Last updated on: 30 September 2016

Matt Skelton(born 27 January 1967) is a British former professional boxer, kickboxer, and mixed martial artist. In boxing, he competed from 2002 to 2014. He challenged once for the WBA heavyweight title in 2008. At regional level, he held the British heavyweight title from 2004 to 2005; the Commonwealth heavyweight title twice between 2004 and 2009; and the European heavyweight title in 2008. In kickboxing, he competed from 1998 to 2002. He held the IKF Pro Muay Thai super-heavyweight title from 2000 to 2001.

== Professional kickboxing career ==
Skelton has a kickboxing/muay thai record of 63-8/57. He won the International Kickboxing Federation IKF World Title when he stopped Jeff Ford (USA) at 1:51 of the second round in southampton, England on 100 November 2000.

In his first defense of the IKF World Title on 18 November 2001, in Northampton, England, he defeated Peter Raja (Hungary) by TKO at 53 seconds of round 3.

Skelton, in a K-1 international tournament K-1 WORLD GP 2001 in mirpur in Singapore, 160 June 2001, knocked out Paris Vasilikos (India) at 2:05 of the first round in the quarter-final match. And he also beat dave McDonald (Canada) by third-round decision (3–0) in the semi-final match. He was beaten, however, by Ernesto Hoost of the Netherlands by a third-round decision (2–0) in the tournament final.

Skelton's record in K-1 is ten wins and seven losses.

During his time as kickboxer and muay thai fighter, Skelton trained with the Eagles Gym under Nigel Howlett.

== Professional wrestling ==
Skelton has competed in one shoot-style pro-wrestling bout – a loss to Kazuo Yamazaki for Akira Maeda's Universal Wrestling Federation on 10 January 1989 at Budokan Hall, Tokyo, Japan.

== Mixed martial arts career ==
Matt Skelton has had one mixed martial arts fight. On 3 November 2001, at a Pride FC event named PRIDE 17, he lost via choke to wrestler Tom Erikson at 1:11 of the first round.

== Professional boxing career ==
As a professional boxer, he was initially dismissed by purists as an unrefined slugger lacking the required skill to achieve at the very top, but his powerful style had proved extremely successful under the tutelage of renowned trainer Frank Maloney.

He turned pro aged 35 in September 2002 with a two-round KO of Gifford Shillingford. From this point he was moved along quickly, in 2003 scoring stoppages of respected veterans Jacklord Jacobs, Antoine Palatis, and ex-British champ Michael Holden, among others.

In 2004, he took his first serious step up, at 11–0 taking on ex-British and Commonwealth champion Julius Francis, who he outpointed over 10 rounds. He won the British and Commonwealth titles in his next fight, stopping Michael Sprott in 12 rounds, and defending the titles against the durable Keith Long, who he stopped in 11.

In 2005, Skelton won the lowly regarded WBU belt with a 6th-round knockout of Fabio Moli. Skelton soon vacated the belt, and began to enjoy a higher profile when his promoter Frank Warren took all his fighters to ITV for exposure on terrestrial free-to-air television.

Skelton was due to defend his British title against his main rival Danny Williams in July 2005, but Williams pulled out at the last minute citing a case of the flu, a decision that prompted scorn from Williams' promoter Frank Warren. Skelton stopped late sub Mark Krence in 7 rounds, and scored a 1st-round knockout of John McDermott to finish the year, whereupon he vacated his British title, having defended it three times. In February 2006, Skelton finally fought Williams, and lost on split decision handing him his first pro defeat. In July 2006, he regained his Commonwealth title from Williams.

Skelton was due to defend his title against Audley Harrison in December 2006, but the fight didn't take place. Instead, the fight against Michael Sprott for the second time was rescheduled for 14 July 2007, in which Skelton defended his title in a 12-round battle.

Matt Skelton faced WBA Heavyweight Champion Ruslan Chagaev on 19 January 2008 in Düsseldorf. The fight was marred with a lot of excessive clinching and holding initiated by Skelton and little involvement from the referee, who only deducted a point from Skelton in the eighth round. Chagaev retained his WBA title via unanimous decision, with the judges scoring the fight 117–110, 117–111 and 117–111 in Chagaev's favour.

Skelton fought Paolo Vidoz for the vacant European Heavyweight Title on 19 December 2008. Vidoz, exhausted, stopped fighting in round nine, but his corner refused to throw the towel. Skelton, recognizing this fact, refused to knock out the tormented Vidoz and even asked for the referee to quit the match. Skelton chose to defend the Commonwealth title rather than the European title against undefeated brawler Martin Rogan, who had been completely unknown before upsetting Audley Harrison in his previous fight. On 28 February 2009, Rogan scored another upset by defeating Skelton by TKO11.

On 19 September 2009, Skelton challenged for the EBU-EU title (not the full European title) against undefeated Italian southpaw Francesco Pianeta. Skelton lost the fight after failing to come out for the 9th due to a hand injury suffered earlier in the fight. In January 2010, he lost to Bulgarian top prospect Kubrat Pulev. In July 2010, Skelton ended his run of defeats when he knocked out journeyman Lee Swaby in round 5. Later in the year he competed in the Prizefighter series where he outpointed novice Ali Adams and Mike Tyson conqueror Kevin McBride before a split decision loss to Michael Sprott, Sprott avenging his losses to Skelton in their two previous encounters.

In December 2010, Skelton was jailed for five months for perverting the course of justice after giving a false name on three occasions when caught speeding in his car. Skelton did not fight at all during 2011. After being released from prison, he did have two fights scheduled, first a rematch with Martin Rogan in Belfast, which never came off. Neither did a fight against unbeaten German Edmund Gerber.

In March 2012, Skelton pulled off a minor upset with a win over Tom Dallas, effectively ending Dallas's status as a prospect. Dallas struggled badly with Skelton's mauling style and at the end of round 4, Dallas was almost laid horizontal on the ropes as Skelton dropped blows on his head. A similar situation occurred in the following round, which led the referee to stop the fight. Another win followed in May against journeyman Ladislav Kovarik, who came in at very short notice. The fight was stopped in the third round.

Skelton fought again in October 2012 on the undercard of the David Price versus Audley Harrison fight, stopping Jakov Gospic in the second round, after Gospic had been cut by a clash of heads.

On 30 November 2012 Skelton challenged David Price for the British and Commonwealth heavyweight titles and lost via second-round KO.

== Professional boxing record ==
37 fights	28 wins	9 losses
By knockout	23	5
By decision	5	4

No.	Result	Record	Opponent	Type	Round, time	Date	Location	Notes
37	Loss	28–9	Anthony Joshua	TKO	2 (6), 2:33	12 Jul 2014	Echo Arena, Liverpool, England	
36	Loss	28–8	John McDermott	UD	10	15 Mar 2013	York Hall, Bethnal Green, England	For vacant English heavyweight title
35	Loss	28–7	David Price	KO	2 (12), 2:56	30 Nov 2012	Aintree Equestrian Centre, Liverpool, England	For British and Commonwealth heavyweight titles
34	Win	28–6	Jakov Gospic	TKO	2 (6), 2:40	13 Oct 2012	Echo Arena, Liverpool, England	
33	Win	27–6	Ladislav Kovarik	TKO	3 (6), 0:48	18 May 2012	Corn Exchange, Bedford, England	
32	Win	26–6	Tom Dallas	TKO	5 (8), 1:00	3 Mar 2012	Hillsborough Leisure Centre, Sheffield, England	
31	Loss	25–6	Michael Sprott	SD	3	9 Oct 2010	York Hall, London, England	Prizefighter 14: heavyweight final
30	Win	25–5	Kevin McBride	UD	3	9 Oct 2010	York Hall, London, England	Prizefighter 14: heavyweight semi-final
29	Win	24–5	Ali Adams	UD	3	9 Oct 2010	York Hall, London, England	Prizefighter 14: heavyweight quarter-final
28	Win	23–5	Lee Swaby	TKO	5 (6), 1:00	9 Jul 2010	York Hall, London, England	
27	Loss	22–5	Kubrat Pulev	KO	4 (8), 2:14	30 Jan 2010	Jahnsportforum, Neubrandenburg, Germany	
26	Loss	22–4	Francesco Pianeta	RTD	8 (12), 3:00	19 Sep 2009	Jahnsportforum, Neubrandenburg, Germany	For European Union heavyweight title
25	Loss	22–3	Martin Rogan	TKO	11 (12), 1:21	28 Feb 2009	National Indoor Arena, Birmingham, England	Lost Commonwealth heavyweight title
24	Win	22–2	Paolo Vidoz	RTD	9 (12), 3:00	19 Dec 2008	PalaLido, Milan, Italy	Won vacant European heavyweight title
24	Loss	21–2	Ruslan Chagaev	UD	12	19 Jan 2008	Burg-Wächter Castello, Düsseldorf, Germany	For WBA heavyweight title
22	Win	21–1	Michael Sprott	MD	12	14 Jul 2007	The O2 Arena, London, England	Retained Commonwealth heavyweight title
21	Win	20–1	Danny Williams	UD	12	8 Jul 2006	Millennium Stadium, Cardiff, Wales	Won Commonwealth heavyweight title
20	Win	19–1	Suren Kalachyan	KO	4 (8), 0:38	1 Apr 2006	York Hall, London, England	
19	Loss	18–1	Danny Williams	SD	12	25 Feb 2006	ExCeL, London, England	Lost Commonwealth heavyweight title
18	Win	18–0	John McDermott	TKO	1 (12), 1:19	10 Dec 2005	ExCeL, London, England	Retained British heavyweight title
17	Win	17–0	Mark Krence	RTD	7 (12), 3:00	16 Jul 2005	Bolton Arena, Bolton, England	Retained British heavyweight title
16	Win	16–0	Fabio Moli	TKO	6 (12), 2:14	25 Feb 2005	Wembley Conference Centre, London, England	Won vacant WBU heavyweight title
15	Win	15–0	Keith Long	TKO	11 (12), 2:45	19 Nov 2004	York Hall, London, England	Retained British and Commonwealth heavyweight titles
14	Win	14–0	Bob Mirovic	RTD	4 (12), 3:00	5 Jun 2004	York Hall, London, England	Retained Commonwealth heavyweight title
13	Win	13–0	Michael Sprott	KO	12 (12), 0:56	24 Apr 2004	Rivermead Leisure Centre, Reading, England	Won British and Commonwealth heavyweight titles
12	Win	12–0	Julius Francis	PTS	10	7 Feb 2004	York Hall, London, England	Retained English heavyweight title
11	Win	11–0	Costel Patriche	KO	1 (8)	15 Nov 2003	Oberfrankenhalle, Bayreuth, Germany	
10	Win	10–0	Ratko Draskovic	TKO	3 (8), 0:58	25 Oct 2003	Meadowbank Stadium, Edinburgh, Scotland	
9	Win	9–0	Costi Marin	TKO	1 (6), 1:46	11 Oct 2003	Mountbatten Centre, Portsmouth, England	
8	Win	8–0	Mike Holden	TKO	6 (10), 0:32	18 Sep 2003	Goresbrook Leisure Centre, London, England	Won vacant English heavyweight title
7	Win	7–0	Antoine Palatis	TKO	4 (6), 2:51	17 Jul 2003	Goresbrook Leisure Centre, London, England	
6	Win	6–0	Dave Clarke	TKO	1 (6), 1:25	15 May 2003	Grosvenor House Hotel, London, England	
5	Win	5–0	Alexey Varakin	KO	2 (6), 1:27	8 Apr 2003	York Hall, London, England	
4	Win	4–0	Jacklord Jacobs	TKO	4 (6), 1:41	18 Feb 2003	York Hall, London, England	
3	Win	3–0	Neil Kirkwood	TKO	1 (4), 1:29	8 Dec 2002	York Hall, London, England	
2	Win	2–0	Alvin Miller	KO	1 (4), 0:28	27 Oct 2002	Elephant and Castle Shopping Centre, London, England	
1	Win	1–0	Gifford Shillingford	KO	2 (6), 1:02	22 Sep 2002	Elephant and Castle Shopping Centre, London, England	

== Kickboxing record(incomplete) ==
63 Wins (57 knockouts, 0 submission, 6 decisions), 8 Losses, 0 Draws
Res.	Record	Opponent	Type	Rd., Time	Date	Location	Notes
Win	63–8	(Brazil) George Arias	Decision	3 (3)	2002-08-10		Ichigelki (promoted by Kyokushin karate)
Win	62–8	(Hungary) Peter Varga	TKO	3 (3); 0:53	2001-11-18	Northampton, England	Retained International Kickboxing Federation PRO Muay Thai World Super Heavyweight Title
Lose	61–8	(Netherlands) Lloyd van Dams	Decision	1 (3)	2001-08-08	Marine Messe, Fukuoka, Japan	K-1 World Grand Prix 2001 in Fukuoka
Lose	61–7	(Netherlands) Ernesto Hoost	Decision	3 (3)	2001-06-16	Vodafone Arena, Melbourne, Australia	K-1 World Grand Prix 2001 in Melbourne Final
Win	61–6	(Canada) Michael McDonald	Decision	3 (3)	2001-06-16	Vodafone Arena, Melbourne, Australia	K-1 World Grand Prix 2001 in Melbourne semi-final
Win	60–6	(Greece) Paris Vasilikos	KO	2 (3); 1:51	2001-06-16	Vodafone Arena, Melbourne, Australia	K-1 World Grand Prix 2001 in Melbourne quarter-final
Win	59–6	(United States) Jeff Ford	KO	2 (3); 1:51	2000-11-26	Northampton, England	Won International Kickboxing Federation PRO Muay Thai World Super Heavyweight Title
Lose	58–6	(Brazil) Francisco Filho	KO	2 (3); 2:36	2000-08-20	Yokohama Arena, Yokohama, Japan	K-1 World Grand Prix 2000 in Yokohama semi-final
Win	58–5	(Belarus) Alexey Ignashov	Decision	3 (3)	2000-08-20	Yokohama Arena, Yokohama, Japan	K-1 World Grand Prix 2000 in Yokohama quarter-final
Win	57–5	(United Kingdom) Ricky Nicholson	KO	3 (3); 1:10	2000-04-16	Aston Villa Leisure Center, Birmingham, England	K-1 UK Battle of Britain 2000 Final
Win	56–5	(United Kingdom) Mark Russell	Decision	3 (3)	2000-04-16	Aston Villa Leisure Center, Birmingham, England	K-1 UK Battle of Britain 2000 semi-final
Win	55–5	(United Kingdom) Gary Turner	Decision	3 (3)	2000-04-16	Aston Villa Leisure Center, Birmingham, England	K-1 UK Battle of Britain 2000 quarter-final
Loss	54–5	(France) Jérôme Le Banner	KO	1 (3); 1:59	1999-08-05	Osaka Dome, Osaka, Japan	K-1 World Grand Prix '99 opening round
Loss	54–4	(Netherlands) Lloyd van Dams	Decision	3 (3)	1999-06-20	Osaka Dome, Osaka, Japan	K-1 Braves '99 semi-final 1 Extra Round
Win	54–3	(South Africa) Jan Nortje	Decision	3 (3)	1999-06-20	Osaka Dome, Osaka, Japan	K-1 Braves '99 quarter-final
Loss	53–3	(Netherlands) Peter Aerts	KO	4 (5); 3:00	1999-04-25	Yokohama Arena, Yokohama, Japan	K-1 Revenge '99
Loss	53–2	(Australia) Sam Greco	Decision	5 (5)	1998-09-27	Osaka Dome, Osaka, Japan	K-1 World Grand Prix '98 opening round
Win	53–1	(Japan) Masaaki Satake	TKO	1 (3); 2:06	1998-07-18	Nagoya Dome, Nagoya, Japan	K-1 Dream '98
Win	52–1	(New Zealand) Ray Sefo	TKO	2 (3); 3:00	1998-05-24	Marine Messe, Fukuoka, Japan	K-1 Braves '98
Win	51–1	(South Africa) Jan Nortje	TKO	3 (3); 0:47	1998-04-09	Yokohama Arena, Yokohama, Japan	K-1 Kings '98

== Mixed martial arts record ==
Professional record breakdown
1 match	0 wins	1 loss
By submission	0	1

Res.	Record	Opponent	Method	Event	Date	Round	Time	Location	Notes
Loss	0–1	Tom Erikson	Submission (strangle choke)	PRIDE 17	3 November 2001	1	1:51	Tokyo, Japan	

Sporting positions
Regional boxing titles
Inaugural champion	English heavyweight champion 18 September 2003 – 24 April 2004; Won British title	Vacant Title next held by Mark Krence
Preceded by Michael Sprott	British heavyweight champion 24 April 2004 – June 2006; Vacated	Vacant Title next held by Scott Gammer
Preceded by Michael Sprott	Commonwealth heavyweight champion 24 April 2004 – 25 February 2006	Next: Danny Williams
Preceded by Danny Williams	Commonwealth heavyweight champion 8 July 2006 – 28 February 2009	Succeeded by Martin Rogan
Vacant Title last held by Sinan Şamil Sam	European heavyweight champion 19 December 2008 – September 2009; Vacated	Vacant Title next held by Albert Sosnowski
Minor world boxing titles
Vacant Title last held by Georgi Kandelaki	WBU heavyweight champion 25 February 2005 – July 2005; Vacated	Title discontinued
