= Martin Rogan =

Irish boxer (born 1975)

Personal information
- Nicknames: The Entertainer; Rogie; Iron man
- Born: 1 May 1975 (age 51) Belfast, Northern Ireland
- Height: 6 ft 3 in (1.91 m)
- Weight: Heavyweight

Boxing career
- Stance: Orthodox

Boxing record
- Total fights: 22
- Wins: 16
- Win by KO: 8
- Losses: 6

Martin Rogan (born 1 May 1977) is an Irish former professional boxer who competed from 2004 to 2014. At regional level, he held the Commonwealth heavyweight title in 2009; and won the inaugural Prizefighter series in 2008.

== Professional career ==
On 11 April 2008, Rogan won the Prizefighter series heavyweight competition on Sky Sports, beating David Dolan in the final by a unanimous decision after knocking his opponent down twice. He beat Alex Ibbs in the quarter-final by TKO and Dave Ferguson on points in the semi-final. On 15 May 2009 he lost to Sam Sexton.

Rogan was due to face Audley Harrison at Aston Villa Events Centre, Birmingham on 19 July 2008. However, the fight was delayed due to television schedules. The fight eventually took place on 6 December 2008, with Rogan defeating Harrison over ten rounds. The referee Ian John-Lewis scored the encounter 96–95.

On 28 February 2009, Rogan became the Commonwealth heavyweight champion in a fight of the year contender which could have gone either way against reigning champion Matt Skelton. During the fight the momentum see-sawed from one man to the other however Rogan prevailed in the brawl by beating Skelton with an 11th round stoppage by TKO.

Rogan's first defence of his Commonwealth heavyweight title against Sam Sexton, at the Odyssey, Belfast on 15 May 2009. Sexton defeated Rogan, handing him his first professional loss, after the doctor ruled that Rogan was unfit to continue in the 8th round due to a closed eye.

Rogan's rematch with Sam Sexton on 6 November 2009, once again at the Odyssey Arena in Belfast, ended in Rogan's corner pulling him out after the end of the sixth round due to a neck and arm injury.

Since the defeats to Sexton, Rogan took exactly a year before making a return to the ring after undergoing career-saving neck and spinal operations. He won two fights within two weeks against Yavor Marinchev and Werner Kreiskott in Ireland. Rogan was scheduled to fight Bulgarian boxer Kubrat Pulev for the European Heavyweight title but pulled out citing lack of preparation. The Pulev fight was originally rescheduled for November in Germany although Rogan was instead scheduled to fight former cruiserweight world title challenger Lewis Andreas Pineda for the vacant WBU World Heavyweight title on 27 October at the Odyssey Arena in Belfast., The fight with Pineda was cancelled after the British Boxing Board of Control refused to sanction it because of doubts over ownership of the WBU belt; two organizations were claiming jurisdiction over the title.

On 14 April 2012 Rogan fought Tyson Fury for the vacant Irish heavyweight title at the Odyssey Area in Belfast and lost via fifth-round TKO

On 9 February 2013 Rogan returned to the ring, and winning ways, by outpointing the Czech Republic's Ladislav Kovarik over four rounds in at fight on the undercard of Carl Frampton's EBU (European) super bantamweight title challenge against Kiko Martinez.

== Professional boxing record ==
22 fights	16 wins	6 losses
By knockout	8	4
By decision	8	2

No.	Result	Record	Opponent	Type	Round, time	Date	Location	Notes
22	Loss	16–6	Michael Sprott	MD	3	4 Jun 2014	The Trusts Arena, Auckland, New Zealand	Super 8 Heavyweight Tournament - quarter-final
21	Loss	16–5	Erkan Teper	KO	1 (10), 1:25	16 Nov 2013	MHPArena, Ludwigsburg, Germany	
20	Loss	16–4	Audley Harrison	UD	3	23 Feb 2013	York Hall, London, England	Prizefighter: The International Heavyweights III - quarter-final
19	Win	16–3	Albert Sosnowski	TKO	3 (3), 1:56	23 Feb 2013	York Hall, London, England	Prizefighter: The International Heavyweights III - quarter-final
18	Win	15–3	Ladislav Kovarik	PTS	4	9 Feb 2013	Odyssey Arena, Belfast, Northern Ireland	
17	Loss	14–3	Tyson Fury	TKO	5 (12), 3:00	14 Apr 2012	Odyssey Arena, Belfast, Northern Ireland	For vacant Irish heavyweight title
16	Win	14–2	Werner Kreiskott	PTS	6	20 Nov 2010	Breaffy House Resort, Castlebar, Ireland	
15	Win	13–2	Yavor Marinchev	TKO	1 (6)	6 Nov 2010	UL Arena, Limerick, Ireland	
14	Loss	12–2	Sam Sexton	RTD	6 (12), 3:00	7 Nov 2009	Odyssey Arena, Belfast, Northern Ireland	For Commonwealth heavyweight title
13	Loss	12–1	Sam Sexton	TKO	8 (12), 2:37	15 May 2009	Odyssey Arena, Belfast, Northern Ireland	Lost Commonwealth heavyweight title
12	Win	12–0	Matt Skelton	TKO	11 (12), 1:21	28 Feb 2009	National Indoor Arena, Birmingham, England	Won Commonwealth heavyweight title
11	Win	11–0	Audley Harrison	PTS	10	6 Dec 2008	ExCeL, London, England	
10	Win	10–0	David Dolan	UD	3	11 Apr 2008	York Hall, London, England	Prizefighter: The Heavyweights - final
9	Win	9–0	Dave Ferguson	UD	3	11 Apr 2008	York Hall, London, England	Prizefighter: The Heavyweights - semi-final
8	Win	8–0	Alex Ibbs	TKO	2 (3), 0:47	11 Apr 2008	York Hall, London, England	Prizefighter: The Heavyweights - quarter-final
7	Win	7–0	Radcliffe Green	TKO	2 (6), 0:55	13 Oct 2007	Park Avenue Hotel, Belfast, Northern Ireland	
6	Win	6–0	Jevgēņijs Stamburskis	TKO	3 (6), 1:38	26 Oct 2006	Andersonstown Leisure Centre, Belfast, Northern Ireland	
5	Win	5–0	Paul King	PTS	6	7 Oct 2006	Holiday Inn, Belfast, Northern Ireland	
4	Win	4–0	Darren Morgan	PTS	4	20 May 2006	King's Hall, Belfast, Northern Ireland	
3	Win	3–0	Tony Booth	TKO	2 (4), 2:27	4 Jun 2005	M.E.N. Arena, Manchester, England	
2	Win	2–0	Billy Bessey	PTS	4	18 Mar 2005	King's Hall, Belfast, Northern Ireland	
1	Win	1–0	Lee Mountford	TKO	1 (4), 0:40	28 Oct 2004	Ulster Hall, Belfast, Northern Ireland	
