= 1998 Ju-Jitsu World Championships =

- Host city: Berlin, Germany
- Organiser: Ju-Jitsu International Federation
- Dates: 21–22 November

The 1998 Ju-Jitsu World Championship were the 3rd edition of the Ju-Jitsu World Championships, and were held in Berlin, Germany from November 21 to November 22, 1998.

== Schedule ==
- 21.11.1998 – Men's and Women's Fighting System, Women's Duo System – Classic, Mixed Duo System – Classic
- 22.11.1998 – Men's and Women's Fighting System, Men's Duo System – Classic

== European Ju-Jitsu ==
=== Fighting System ===
==== Men's events ====
Category	Gold	Silver	Bronze	
–62 kg	Jörn Meiners (GER)	Taco Morren (NED)	Kelly Molinari (FRA)	Dariusz Świercz (POL)
–69 kg	Gerhard Ableidinger (AUT)	Stéphane Groseil (FRA)	Andreas Breslavski (GER)	Michael van Rijt (NED)
–77 kg	Marc Marie-Louise (FRA)	Gregory Vallarino (URU)	Tilen Oštir (SLO)	Thomas Kager (GER)
–85 kg	Bertrand Amoussou (FRA)	Rob Haans (NED)	Arkadiusz Musiał (POL)	Ricard Carneborn (SWE)
–94 kg	Joachim Göhrmann (GER)	Gary Turner (GBR)	Allard Schulenklopper (NED)	Robert Łukasik (POL)
+94 kg	Dariusz Zimoląg (POL)	Christophe Julve (FRA)	Remco Pardoel (NED)	Matthias Schröder (GER)

==== Women's events ====
Category	Gold	Silver	Bronze	
–55 kg	Florence Bailly (FRA)	Esther Oostlander (NED)	Ingela Viktorsson (SWE)	Diana Gascó (ESP)
–62 kg	Patricia Hekkens (NED)	Armelle Iost (FRA)	Jeanne Rasmussen (DEN)	Ute Niendorf (GER)
–70 kg	Sophie Albert (FRA)	Judith de Weerd (NED)	Anna Dimberg (SWE)	Daniela Cosandier (GER)
+70 kg	Jennie Brolin (SWE)	Sabine Felser (GER)	Marjorie Renard (BEL)	Agnieszka Ruzik (POL)

=== Duo System ===
==== Duo Classic events ====
Category	Gold	Silver	Bronze	
men	Sascha Vetter (GER); Joachim Thumfart (GER)	Thomas Darholt (DEN); Kent Hielscher (DEN)	Roman Bobits (AUT); Ferdinand Fuhrmann (AUT)	Jérôme Laurent (FRA); Bruno Pereira (FRA)
women	Karina Lauridsen (DEN); Vibeke Mortensen (DEN)	Silke Mundigl (GER); Sonja Wittmann (GER)	Florence Bailly (FRA); Laetita Deloris (FRA)	Sandy Van Landeghem (BEL); Vanessa Van de Vijver (BEL)
mixed	Hubert Erjawetz (GER); Silvia Heißenhuber (GER)	Antonio Da Costa (FRA); Minh-Minh Ngo (FRA)	Ferdinand Fuhrmann (AUT); Sabine Kampf (AUT)	Gabriele Gardini (ITA); Valeria Zaccaria (ITA)
