= Gary Turner (fighter) =

English Ju-Jitsu practitioner, kickboxer and mixed martial arts fighter

- Born: 2 September 1970 (age 56)
- Other names: Smiler
- Nationality: English
- Height: 6 ft 1 in (1.85 m)
- Weight: 225 lb (102 kg; 16.1 st)
- Division: Heavyweight (kickboxing); Heavyweight (MMA)
- Style: Kickboxing
- Team: Team Gary Turner
- Rank: 1st degree black belt in Judo; 1st degree black belt in Ju-Jitsu; 2nd degree black belt in kickboxing

Kickboxing record
- Total: 40
- Wins: 28
- Losses: 10
- Draws: 2

Mixed martial arts record
- Total: 7
- Wins: 4
- By knockout: 4
- Losses: 2
- By knockout: 1
- By decision: 1
- Draws: 1

Other information
- Mixed martial arts record from Sherdog

Gary Turner (born 2 September 1970) is an English professional mixed martial artist who fought in the Cage Rage and K-1 promotions. He was the K-1 UK Grand Prix champion in 2003 and 2004. As a mixed martial artist, he currently holds a record of 4-2-1 with notable victories over Tank Abbott and former British Heavyweight boxing champion, Julius Francis.

== Mixed martial arts career ==
Turner made his professional MMA debut in 1999 with a win over Joe Akano. After fighting once more seven months later Turner did not fight in a professional MMA again until 2007 when he joined Cage Rage. On 21 April 2007, he made his Cage Rage debut against American former UFC fighter Tank Abbott which he won by TKO after 2:31 of the opening round.

He continued with Cage Rage, winning his next two fights against Brazilian Edson Drago and former British heavyweight boxer Julius Francis before suffering his first defeat against Mostapha Al-turk by submission in March 2008, which was to be his final fight in Cage Rage as the promotion folded at the end of 2008. His last MMA fight was in April 2009, losing a split decision to Valdas Pocevicius in Croatia.

== Titles ==
Turner is a 10-time world champion (x2 kickboxing, x8 Ju-Jitsu) who has also won countless European and domestic titles across a wide range of martial arts styles.

Pro Kickboxing

- 2006 W.P.K.C. super heavyweight world champion +95 kg (K-1 rules)
- 2005 K-1 Scandinavia Grand Prix runner up
- 2004 K-1 Battle of Britain champion
- 2003 K-1 Battle of Britain champion
- 1997 W.A.K.O. Pro heavyweight European champion -94 kg (full-contact)
- 1996 W.A.K.O. Pro super cruiserweight British champion -88 kg (low-kick)
- 1995 W.K.A. super cruiserweight British champion -90 kg (full-contact)
- 1995 W.A.K.O. Pro heavyweight British champion -94 kg (low-kick)

Amateur Kickboxing

- 1997 W.A.K.O. World Championships in Gdansk, Poland (gold) (full-contact)
- 1996 W.A.K.O. European Championships in Belgrade, Serbia & Montenegro (gold) -91 kg (full-contact)
- 1994 W.A.K.O. European Championships in Helsinki, Finland (silver) (full-contact)
- 1992 W.A.K.O. European Championships in Varna, Bulgaria (gold) (light-contact)

Ju-Jitsu

- 2001 W.C.J.J.O. World Championships in Jersey, UK (silver) (teams)
- 2001 W.C.J.J.O. World Championships in Jersey, UK (gold) (individual)
- 2000 I.S.J.A. World Championships in Leeds, UK (silver) (teams)
- 2000 I.S.J.A. World Championships in Leeds, UK (gold) (individual)
- 1999 J.J.I.F. European Championships in Leeds, UK (bronze)
- 1998 J.J.I.F. World Championships in Berlin, Germany (silver)
- 1998 W.C.J.J.O. World Championships in Reno, USA (gold) (teams)
- 1998 W.C.J.J.O. World Championships in Reno, USA (gold) (individual)
- 1998 I.S.J.A. World Championships in Vancouver, Canada (silver) (teams)
- 1998 I.S.J.A. World Championships in Vancouver, Canada (gold) (individual)
- 1997 J.J.I.F. European Championships in Paris, France (gold)
- 1996 I.S.J.A. World Championships in West Virginia, USA (silver) (teams)
- 1996 I.S.J.A. World Championships in West Virginia, USA (gold) (individual)
- 1995 W.C.J.J.O. World Championships in Auckland, New Zealand (gold) (teams)
- 1995 W.C.J.J.O. World Championships in Auckland, New Zealand (gold) (individual)

Judo

- 1996 British Schools champion

Shootfighting

- 1992 Golden Dragon Cup in Rimini, Italy tournament champion

== Professional kickboxing record ==
Professional kickboxing record
28 wins, 10 losses, 2 draws
Date	Result	Opponent	Event	Location	Method	Round	Time
2008-10-05	Loss	(Suriname) Tyrone Spong	K.O. Events "Tough Is Not Enough"	Rotterdam, Netherlands	TKO (doc stop)	1	1:05
2006-12-08	Win	(Palestine) Samir Seif	Shin Do Kumaté XI	Tampa, FL, USA	Decision	3	3:00
2006-09-09	Draw	(United States) Rick Roufus	Shin Do Kumaté X	Tampa, FL, USA	Decision draw	3	3:00
2006-03-03	Win	(United States) Carter Williams	Arnold Schwarzenegger Classic 2006	Columbus, OH, USA	Decision (unanimous)	5	3:00
2005-10-29	Win	(France) Gregory Tony	K-1 New Talents 2005 in Germany	Koblenz, Germany	TKO (corner stop)	3	3:00
2005-09-24	Win	(Albania) Azem Maksutaj	Fight Night Winterthur	Winterthur, Switzerland	Decision (unanimous)	5	3:00
Wins Maksutaj's W.P.K.C. K-1 rules super heavyweight world title +95 kg.
2005-05-21	Loss	(Switzerland) Bjorn Bregy	K-1 Scandinavia GP '05, Final	Stockholm, Sweden	Decision (unanimous)	3	3:00
Fight was for K-1 Scandinavia GP 2005 tournament title.
2005-05-21	Win	(Sweden) Wisam Feyli	K-1 Scandinavia GP '05, Semi Final	Stockholm, Sweden	Decision (split)	3	3:00
2005-05-21	Win	(Finland) Topi Helin	K-1 Scandinavia GP '05, Quarter Final	Stockholm, Sweden	Decision (split)	3	3:00
2004-12-12	Loss	(Morocco) Badr Hari	Rings Fightgala "Born Invincible"	Utrecht, Netherlands	Decision (unanimous)	5	3:00
2004-04-24	Win	(Czech Republic) Daniel Waciakowski	Pain and Glory	Birmingham, England, UK	TKO	2	
2004-02-22	Win	(England) Nick Sheppard	K-1 Battle of Britain 2004, Final	Wolverhampton, England, UK	KO (leg kick)	1	
Wins K-1 Battle of Britain 2004 tournament title.
2004-02-22	Win	(England) James Zikic	K-1 Battle of Britain 2004, Semi Final	Wolverhampton, England, UK	Ext.R decision	4	3:00
2004-02-22	Win	(England) Steve Jones	K-1 Battle of Britain 2004, Quarter Final	Wolverhampton, England, UK	TKO (corner stop)	2	
2003-08-20	Loss	(Russia) Alexander Ustinov	K-1 Spain GP '03, Semi Final	Barcelona, Spain	Decision (unanimous)	3	3:00
2003-08-20	Win	(Spain) Daniel Perez	K-1 Spain GP '03, Quarter Final	Barcelona, Spain	Decision (unanimous)	3	3:00
2003-05-30	Loss	(Switzerland) Bjorn Bregy	K-1 World GP '03 Basel, Semi Final	Basel, Switzerland	Decision	3	3:00
2003-05-30	Win	(Turkey) Hasan Kuzucular	K-1 World GP '03 Basel, Reserve Fight	Basel, Switzerland	KO	2	
2003-04-13	Win	(Wales) Gordon Minors	K-1 World GP '03 Prelim. UK, Final	Birmingham, England, UK	TKO (doc stop)	1	0:15
Wins K-1 World GP 2003 Prelim. UK tournament title and qualifies for reserve fight at K-1 World GP '03 Basel.
2003-04-13	Win	(England) Simon Dimitrious	K-1 World GP '03 Prelim. UK, Semi Final	Birmingham, England, UK	Decision	3	3:00
2003-04-13	Win	(England) Kenny Gayle	K-1 World GP '03 Prelim. UK, Quarter Final	Birmingham, England, UK	Decision	3	3:00
2002-11-17	Win	(England) Rob Lloyd	K-1 UK MAX 2002, Super Fight	Birmingham, England, UK	Decision	5	3:00
2002-03-24	Loss	(England) Mark Russell	K-1 World GP '02 Prelim. UK, Quarter Final	Birmingham, England, UK	Decision (majority)	3	3:00
2001-?-?	Loss	(Italy) Augusto Sparano	Trieste Sport Show	Trieste, Italy	Decision	12	2:00
Fight was for W.A.K.O. Pro full-contact super cruiserweight world title -88 kg.
2000-11-19	Win	(England) Tyrone Herod	K-1 UK Global Heat 2000	Birmingham, England, UK	Decision	3	3:00
2000-04-16	Loss	(England) Matt Skelton	K-1 UK Battle of Britain 2000, Quarter Final	Birmingham, England, UK	Decision (unanimous)	3	3:00
2000-?-?	Loss			Cyprus	Decision	10	2:00
Loses W.A.K.O. Pro full-contact heavyweight European title -94 kg.
1997-?-?	Win	(Turkey) Tacci Edhem		Macedonia	Decision	5	2:00
1997-?-?	Win	Leroy Tomski		England, UK	KO	2	
Wins W.A.K.O. Pro full-contact heavyweight European title -94 kg.
1997-?-?	Draw	(Wales) Gordon Minors		England, UK	Decision draw	7	2:00
Fight was for W.A.K.O. Pro full-contact heavyweight Commonwealth title -94 kg.
1996-?-?	Win	(England) Lee Swaby		England, UK	Decision	7	3:00
Wins W.A.K.O. Pro low-kick super cruiserweight British title -88 kg.
1996-?-?	Win	(England) Ian Morgan		England, UK	KO	2	
1995-?-?	Win	(England) Ricky Nicholson		England, UK	Decision	7	2:00
Wns W.K.A. full-contact super cruiserweight British title -90 kg.
1995-?-?	Win	(England) Ian Morgan		England, UK	TKO	2	
Wins W.A.K.O. Pro low-kick heavyweight British title -94 kg.
1994-?-?	Loss	(England) Kevin Morton		England, UK	Decision	10	2:00
Fight was for W.K.A. full-contact super cruiserweight intercontinental title -90 kg.
1991-?-?	Win	(England) Richard Smith		England, UK	KO	2	
Legend: Win Loss Draw/no contest Notes

== Mixed martial arts record ==
Professional record breakdown
7 matches	4 wins	2 losses
By knockout	4	1
By decision	0	1
Draws	1	

Res.	Record	Opponent	Method	Event	Date	Round	Time	Location	Notes
Loss	4–2–1	Valdas Pocevicius	Decision (split)	NG 4: Noc Gladiatora 4	25 April 2009	3	5:00	Dubrovnik, Croatia	
Loss	4–1–1	Mostapha al-Turk	TKO (submission to punches)	Cage Rage 25	8 March 2008	1	3:19	London, England	
Win	4–0–1	Julius Francis	TKO (submission to punches)	Cage Rage 23	22 September 2007	2	2:17	London, England	
Win	3–0–1	Edson Claas Vieira	TKO (corner stoppage)	Cage Rage 22	14 July 2007	2	5:00	London, England	
Win	2–0–1	Tank Abbott	TKO (punches)	Cage Rage 21	21 April 2007	1	2:31	London, England	
Draw	1–0–1	Lee MacGuinness	Draw	Total Fight KRG 5	3 October 1999	2	5:00	Buckinghamshire, England	
Win	1–0	Joe Akano	KO	Night of the Samurai 3	7 March 1999	2	N/A	Milton Keynes, England	
