= Riddick Bowe vs. Andrew Golota II =

1996 boxing match

- Date: December 14, 1996
- Venue: Boardwalk Hall, Atlantic City, New Jersey, U.S.

Tale of the tape
Boxer	Riddick Bowe	Andrew Golota
Nickname	Big Daddy	
Hometown	Brooklyn, New York, U.S.	Warsaw, Poland
Pre-fight record	39–1 (1) (32 KO)	28–1 (25 KO)
Age	29 years, 4 months	28 years, 11 months
Height	6 ft 5 in (196 cm)	6 ft 4 in (193 cm)
Weight	235 lb (107 kg)	239 lb (108 kg)
Style	Orthodox	Orthodox
Recognition	The Ring; No. 3 Ranked Heavyweight; Former Undisputed Champion	WBC/IBF; No. 8 Ranked Heavyweight; WBA; No. 10 Ranked Heavyweight; The Ring; No. 6 Ranked Heavyweight

Result
- Bowe wins via 9th-round disqualification

Riddick Bowe vs. Andrew Golota II was a professional boxing match contested on December 14, 1996 at Boardwalk Hall in Atlantic City, New Jersey. The bout was a rematch of a controversial fight held earlier in the year at Madison Square Garden in which Bowe was largely outboxed by Golota, but won the fight by disqualification, in the same fashion that the first fight had, as Golota was once again disqualified for repeated low blows.

== Background ==
The first fight between Bowe and Golota was signed as part of an agreement between Bowe and former world champion Lennox Lewis, where the two men would face each other at some indeterminate point before the end of 1996. As per the contract, both fighters were required to take a tune-up fight before facing each other. Paired against the Polish up-and-comer, Bowe did not take his training seriously for the Golota fight, saying that he didn't know how to train for "a bum". This did not sit well with Bowe's longtime trainer Eddie Futch, who was growing increasingly frustrated with Bowe's tendency to not want to put in the work in training camp.

Bowe weighed in for the fight at 252 pounds, which was the heaviest he had ever been for any of his professional bouts, and was not in prime physical condition. Golota took advantage of this and dominated most of the fight, constantly and effectively using his jab and landing several powerful combinations through the course of seven rounds. However, from the second round forward, Golota ran into trouble with low blows and had one point deducted in each of the fourth and sixth rounds. Though he was ahead on all scorecards, another vicious blow to Bowe's testicles in the seventh led to referee Wayne Kelly stopping the fight and awarding Bowe the victory by disqualification. Almost immediately after the stoppage, members of Bowe's entourage entered the ring and attacked Golota, Golota traded punches with one of the men, but another, Jason Harris, struck Golota in the head with a walkie-talkie (Golota later required 11 stitches to close the resulting gash). Fans of both fighters joined the melee and fights began breaking out in the crowd. The post-fight riot led to 10 arrests and nine spectators had to be rushed to hospital.

Bowe's poor performance against Golota led to Lewis deciding not to pursue their previously agreed upon fight and instead focus his sights on regaining the heavyweight championship. Futch, who said he was "embarrassed" by Bowe's effort, decided that he could no longer train the former undisputed world champion and announced this to the press in October 1996. Futch cited "irreconcilable differences" as his reasoning and felt that Bowe was continuing to waste his time by not putting in the work. Bowe later admitted he had not taken Golota seriously coming into the previous fight and attributed his poor performance to the fact that he had not trained much for the bout.

There was still significant interest in a rematch between Bowe and Golota, and the fight was signed for December of 1996. For the rematch, Bowe brought in renowned trainer Mackie Shilstone and a nutritionist to monitor his training and diet and weighed in at 235 pounds for the rematch with Golota.

=== Media coverage ===
Unlike the first fight, which was broadcast on HBO World Championship Boxing, the second fight was broadcast on pay-per-view with TVKO (HBO's PPV arm) carrying the contest. Jim Lampley called the action with Larry Merchant and George Foreman as analysts and Harold Lederman as the unofficial ringside scorekeeper.

== The Fight ==
Despite coming into the fight in much better condition than he had in their previous fight earlier in the year, Bowe still struggled against Golota. As in their previous fight, Bowe had trouble landing his jab in the first round while Golota was able to effectively use his and landed nearly twice as many punches in the first round than Bowe. In the second round, Golota landed a left–right combination at the one-minute mark, knocking Bowe down for only the second time in his professional career.

However, Golota once again resorted to his fouling tendencies and gave Bowe a deliberate and hard headbutt toward the end of the round. Referee Eddie Cotton took a point away from Golota, who had opened a cut over his eye with the butt. Despite his foul, Golota ended the second round having dominated Bowe punch-wise, landing 71 of his 96 punches while Bowe only managed to land 11 of his 43 punches.

Bowe bounced back to have a solid third round and dominated Golota during the fourth. Bowe landed a 15–punch combination that sent Golota to the canvas as the first minute of the round came to an end. It was the first time Golota had been knocked down. The combination also re-opened Golota's cut and he was forced to finish the final two minutes of the round with blood trickling from his left eye. Golota also hit Bowe with two low blows before the round ended, the second of which dropped Bowe to the canvas and resulted in Cotton deducting a second point from his total.

Golota rebounded from his poor fourth round to have a great fifth round that saw him gain a second knockdown of Bowe. At 1:47 of the round Golota delivered an 11-punch combination that again sent Bowe to the mat. Bowe was able to answer Cotton's count but again was met with a furious rally from Golota, who was able to pin Bowe against the ropes with a barrage of power punches, though Bowe managed to survive the round. Golota continued to dominate rounds six through eight, winning all three rounds on the judge's scorecards. However, he did not keep his punches clean and was warned by Cotton to stop rabbit punching Bowe during the course of these rounds. He also was admonished by his trainer Lou Duva for throwing punches around Bowe’s beltline, as Duva did not want to risk him getting disqualified again.

Golota would not heed the warnings from his trainer, however. As the ninth round was drawing to a close, Golota landed a vicious three punch combination to the groin. Bowe fell to the canvas in pain again, and Cotton had seen enough. The fight was stopped and Bowe was given another victory by disqualification over Golota.

== Aftermath ==
The two fighters headed in opposite directions after the fight. Bowe decided to enlist in the United States Marine Corps Reserve in January 1997, but ended up leaving after only 10 days of training. Then on April 30 of that year, Bowe announced his retirement from boxing at the age of 29. Meanwhile, despite his two disqualification losses, Golota was named the WBC's number one contender, gaining the championship match with Lennox Lewis that Bowe had previously wanted prior to his fights with Golota. Golota would ultimately lose his match with Lewis by first-round knockout.

== Undercard ==
Confirmed bouts: The undercard for the event featured several bouts featuring boxers that would either win or contend for world championships later in their careers. Two of these fighters were Zab Judah, who was fighting in only his second career bout, and Joel Casamayor, who was also fighting in his second bout. Both fighters won by knockout.

Reigning WBA super welterweight champion Laurent Boudouani was also on the undercard, but he did not defend his championship in a knockout victory.

1996 Olympic bronze medalist Terrance Cauthen made his professional debut, winning a unanimous decision in a four-round bout.

The night also saw previously undefeated heavyweight contender Courage Tshabalala get knocked out by journeyman fighter Brian Scott, future heavyweight contender Vaughn Bean score a first round knockout over journeyman Earl Talley, and a battle of former champions as two-time champion Tim Witherspoon lost a unanimous decision to former WBO champion Ray Mercer.

== Broadcasting ==
Country	Broadcaster
Mexico	TV Azteca
Poland	Canal+
United Kingdom	Sky Sports
United States	HBO

Preceded by First Fight	Riddick Bowe's bouts December 14, 1996	Succeeded by vs. Marcus Rhode
Preceded by First Fight	Andrew Golota's bouts December 14, 1996	Succeeded by vs. Lennox Lewis
