= James Oyebola =

Nigerian-British boxer

Personal information
- Nickname: Big Bad
- Nationality: Nigerian; British
- Born: 10 June 1961 Lagos, Nigeria
- Died: 27 July 2007 (aged 46) Charing Cross Hospital, London, United Kingdom
- Weight: Heavyweight

Boxing career
- Stance: Orthodox

Boxing record
- Total fights: 23
- Wins: 18
- Win by KO: 16
- Losses: 4
- Draws: 1
- No contests: 0
Medal record
Commonwealth Games
Bronze medal – third place	1986 Edinburgh	Super Heavyweight

James Oyebola (10 June 1961 – 27 July 2007) was a Nigerian and British heavyweight boxer who won a bronze medal at the 1986 Commonwealth Games in the super heavyweight division. Oyebola was the British heavyweight champion from 1994 to 1996.

Oyebola was born in Lagos, Nigeria. Standing 6 ft 10 in (2.08 m) tall, with a reach of 85 inches (2.16 m), he fought in the orthodox stance and won 18 of his 23 fights, 16 by knock out, losing four and drawing one. He was pronounced brain dead after injuries sustained by gunshot wounds to his head after a nightclub altercation. He was based in Paddington during his career.

== Amateur career ==
Oyebola was the ABA Super Heavyweight Champion in 1986 and 1987.

== Pro career ==
Oyebola won the WBC International Heavyweight title in 1993 and the vacant British Heavyweight title on 19 November 1994 at the National Ice Rink, Cardiff, Wales when he knocked out Clifton Mitchell in 4 rounds. His last fight, in 1996, was a defeat to Julius Francis. He was nicknamed "Big Bad" during his career.

== Personal life ==
Oyebola fathered two children by Malin Bergstrom, both born in Westminster, London: Kristel Regina Oyebola (born 1994) and James Babatunde Oyebola (born 1999).

== Murder ==
Oyebola was shot in the back of the neck and leg in the early hours of 23 July 2007 after an altercation in the Chateau 6 club at Fulham Broadway where he was visiting a friend for a drink. He had gone to assist staff asking four customers in the rear courtyard to put out their cigarettes to observe the recently imposed smoking ban and was shot as they left the premises.

Simon Block, general secretary of the British Boxing Board of Control, paid the following tribute: "Throughout that time he was truly one of nature's gentlemen and to think of him lying in a hospital bed fighting for his life as a result of a cowardly and gutless attack by those who will not have been possessed of the same courage that he showed in the way he faced adversity, in and out of the ring, fills me with both sadness and dismay."

Oyebola's family decided that they would turn off his life support machine on 27 July 2007 at 11:30 am (10:30 GMT) after he was pronounced brain dead on 26 July 2007. It was announced at 12:39 pm on 27 July 2007 that James Oyebola had died, at Charing Cross Hospital, after his life support machine had been switched off. His funeral was held on 10 September 2007.

=== Aftermath ===
Four men were charged with Oyebola's murder, but charges against two, Rene McKoy and Dean Francis, were dropped. Kanyanta Mubanga Mulenga (born 1985, Wandsworth, London) was convicted on 8 October 2008 of his murder and has been sentenced to 28 years in prison.

A fourth man, who cannot be named for legal reasons, was expected to stand trial in 2009 for James' murder.

The Oyebola family have said they will establish a charity foundation in James Oyebola's name aimed at helping direct youngsters towards a brighter future.

== Professional boxing record ==
18 Wins (16 knockouts, 2 decisions), 4 Losses (4 knockouts), 1 Draws
Res.	Record	Opponent	Type	Rd.	Date	Location	Notes
Loss	18–4-1	Julius Francis	TKO	10 (10), 2:31	27 September 1997	Broadway Theatre, London, England	BBBofC Southern Area heavyweight title
Loss	18–3-1	Scott Welch	TKO	10 (12)	27 October 1995	Metropole Hotel, Brighton, England	Vacant Commonwealth (British Empire) and BBBofC British heavyweight title
Win	18–2-1	Keith McMurray	TKO	7 (10), 1:41	7 February 1995	Corn Exchange, Ipswich, England	
Win	17–2-1	Clifton Mitchell	KO	4 (12), 0:58	19 November 1994	National Ice Rink, Cardiff, Wales	Vacant BBBofC British heavyweight title
Win	16–2-1	Scott Welch	KO	5 (12), 1;00	6 May 1994	Boardwalk Convention Center, Atlantic City, New Jersey, U.S.	WBC International heavyweight title
Win	15–2-1	Ladislao Mijangos	TKO	2 (8), 1:32	9 February 1994	York Hall, London, England	
Win	14–2-1	Jimmy Bills	PTS	8 (8)	1 December 1993	York Hall, London, England	
Win	13–2-1	Roger McKenzie	TKO	1 (12)	13 October 1993	York Hall, London, England	Vacant WBC International and BBBofC Southern Area heavyweight title
Win	12–2-1	Denroy Bryan	TKO	5 (6), 2:15	15 September 1993	York Hall, London, England	
Win	11–2-1	Bombaphani Bonyongo Destroyer	KO	1 (?)	18 May 1991	Harare, Zimbabwe	
Win	10–2-1	Stan Campbell	KO	1 (?), 2:26	4 April 1991	Convention Center, Greenville, Mississippi, U.S.	
Loss	9–2-1	John Westgarth	TKO	5 (6), 0:45	07 March, 1989	Hudsons Sports Centre, Wisbech, England	
Win	9–1-1	Art Terry	KO	5 (8)	15 February 1989	York Hall, London, England	
Win	8–1-1	John Westgarth	KO	3 (6)	31 January 1989	Rivermead Leisure Centre, Reading, England	
Win	7–1-1	Everton Champion Christian	KO	1 (6)	23 November 1988	York Hall, London, England	
Win	6–1-1	Dorcy Gaymon	TKO	1 (6), 0:49	01 November, 1988	Rivermead Leisure Centre, Reading, England	
Win	5–1-1	Tee Lewis	KO	1 (?)	07 September, 1988	Rivermead Leisure Centre, Reading, England	
Draw	4–1-1	Andrew Gerrard	PTS	6 (6)	05 May, 1988	Municipal Hall, London, England	
Win	4–1	Denroy Bryan	TKO	6 (6), 1:44	09 February, 1988	York Hall, London, England	
Loss	3–1	Mike Jones	TKO	2 (6)	24 November 1987	Hudsons Sports Centre, Wisbech, England	
Win	3–0	Carl Timbrell	KO	2 (6)	03 November, 1987	York Hall, London, England	
Win	2–0	Ian Priest	TKO	2 (8), 2:39	16 September 1987	Royal Albert Hall, London, England	
Win	1–0	Andrew Gerrard	PTS	6 (6)	01 July, 1987	Royal Albert Hall, London, England	

== See also ==
- Boxing at the 1986 Commonwealth Games
