= Mike Holden =

English boxer (born 1968)

Personal information
- Nationality: British
- Born: Michael Holden; 13 March 1968 (age 58) Ashton-under-Lyne, Lancashire, U.K
- Height: 6 ft 4 in (193 cm)
- Weight: Heavyweight

Boxing career
- Reach: 81 in (206 cm)
- Stance: Orthodox

Boxing record
- Total fights: 21
- Wins: 10
- Win by KO: 6
- Losses: 10
- Draws: 1

Michael Holden (born 13 March 1968) is a British former professional boxer who competed from 1994 to 2012. He held the British heavyweight title in 2000.

== Professional career ==
Born in Ashton-under-Lyne and based in Manchester, Holden began his professional career in October 1994 with a 4th round stoppage of Gary Williams. After a win and two defeats from his next three fights he fought Julius Francis in July 1996, losing on points. He also did some acting work, including as an extra in Coronation Street.

He won five of his next six fights, earning him a shot at the British title in March 2000 that was then held by Francis; Holden won on points to become British champion. Only two months earlier Holden had acted as bodyguard for Francis during the latter's fight against Mike Tyson and acted as a sparring partner for Francis. After being forced to relinquish his title, he fought Francis again in April 2001 in a fight for the vacant WBO Inter-Continental heavyweight title that was also a final eliminator for the British title; This time Francis got the points decision. In September Holden fought Keith Long in another eliminator for the British title but again lost on points. Holden won only two more fights and lost three of his last five fights, including defeats to Michael Sprott and Matt Skelton, the latter a fight for the vacant English title in 2003, after which he retired.

In 2008 he began training for a comeback and sparred with Tyson Fury. He made his return to the ring in September 2009 against Tomáš Mrázek, a boxer who had lost 22 of 28 fights. The 4-round fight ended in a draw. In 2010 Holden was scheduled to compete in television knockout series but was omitted at the last minute Prizefighter. Holden returned again in 2012 to fight the undefeated Dillian Whyte, with Whyte winning by a TKO in the third round after putting Holden down three times.

== Post career ==
After retiring from boxing, Holden joined the police force.

== Professional boxing record ==
21 fights	10 wins	10 losses
By knockout	6	4
By decision	4	6
Draws	1	

Key to abbreviations used for results
DQ	Disqualification	RTD	Corner retirement
KO	Knockout	SD	Split decision / split draw
MD	Majority decision / majority draw	TD	Technical decision / technical draw
NC	No contest	TKO	Technical knockout
PTS	Points decision	UD	Unanimous decision / unanimous draw

Boxing record
No.	Result	Record	Opponent	Type	Round(s), time	Date	Location	Notes
21	Loss	10–10–1	Dillian Whyte	TKO	3 (6), 1:35	15 Sep 2012	York Hall, London, England	
20	Draw	10–9–1	Tomas Mrazek	PTS	4	4 Sep 2009	Eston Sports Academy, Teesville, England	
19	Loss	10–9	Matt Skelton	TKO	6 (10), 0:32	19 Sep 2003	Goresbrook Leisure Centre, London, England	For vacant English heavyweight title
18	Loss	10–8	Albert Sosnowski	PTS	6	12 Apr 2003	York Hall, London, England	
17	Loss	10–7	Michael Sprott	TKO	4 (8), 0:50	24 Jan 2003	Ponds Forge, Sheffield, England	
16	Win	10–6	Antoine Palatis	PTS	6	15 Oct 2002	York Hall, London, England	
15	Win	9–6	Luke Simpkin	PTS	6	15 Mar 2002	Britannia Hotel, London, England	
14	Loss	8–6	Keith Long	PTS	10	13 Sep 2001	Ponds Forge, Sheffield, England	
13	Loss	8–5	Julius Francis	PTS	12	3 Apr 2001	York Hall, London, England	For vacant WBO Inter-Continental heavyweight title
12	Win	8–4	Julius Francis	PTS	12	13 Mar 2000	York Hall, London, England	Won British heavyweight title
11	Win	7–4	Derek McCafferty	TKO	1 (6), 2:28	15 Jul 1999	Werrington Sports Centre, Peterborough, England	
10	Loss	6–4	Harry Senior	PTS	8	8 May 1999	York Hall, London, England	
9	Win	6–3	Nigel Rafferty	RTD	2 (6), 3:00	12 Dec 1998	Northgate Arena, Chester, England	
8	Win	5–3	Mika Kihlstrom	TKO	1 (10), 1:36	2 Sep 1997	Elephant & Castle Centre, London, England	
7	Win	4–3	Israel Ajose	TKO	1 (6), 0:14	26 Jun 1997	The Willows, Salford, England	
6	Win	3–3	Mikael Lindblad	PTS	6	28 Sep 1996	Broadway Theatre, London, England	
5	Loss	2–3	Julius Francis	PTS	10	9 Jul 1996	York Hall, London, England	
4	Loss	2–2	Michael Murray	PTS	6	14 Nov 1995	Castle Leisure Centre, Bury, England	
3	Win	2–1	Roger McKenzie	TKO	2 (6)	7 Oct 1995	Ulster Hall, Belfast, Northern Ireland	
2	Loss	1–1	Pat Passley	RTD	3 (6), 3:00	20 Dec 1994	York Hall, London, England	
1	Win	1–0	Gary Williams	TKO	4 (6)	4 Oct 1994	Grosvenor House, London, England	

Sporting positions
Regional boxing titles
Previous: Julius Francis	British heavyweight champion 13 March 2000 – 2000	Vacant Title next held by Danny Williams
