= Julius Francis =

English boxer (born 1964)

Personal information
- Born: 8 December 1964 (age 61) Peckham, London, England
- Weight: Heavyweight

Boxing career
- Stance: Orthodox

Boxing record
- Total fights: 48
- Wins: 23
- Win by KO: 12
- Losses: 24
- Draws: 1

Julius Francis (born 8 December 1964) is a British former professional kickboxer, professional boxer and mixed martial artist. At regional level, he held the British and Commonwealth heavyweight titles between 1997 and 2007, and challenged twice for the European heavyweight title in 1997 and 2003.

== Boxing career ==
=== Early career ===
After a troubled youth that saw him spend several spells in prison, Francis turned pro in 1993 at the late age of 28 with a five-round knockout of Graham Arnold. He put together six wins (three by knockout), including two in the US, before being matched with future world heavyweight champion John Ruiz. Francis was stopped in four rounds by body shots.

In 1995 Francis won Southern Area title fights against Damien Caesar and Keith Fletcher. However, he squandered a big opportunity in an eliminator, when far ahead on points after nine rounds, hard hitting Scott Welch came from behind to drop him three times and stop him in 10. After this fight, Welch would go on to win the British title and challenge for a world title.

Later in 1995, he took a fight in Russia and was outpointed by local Nikolai Kulpin and, in London, lost a debatable decision by half a point to veteran Michael Murray.

Francis showed marked improvement in 1996, knocking out ex-victim Caesar in the first round to regain his Southern Area title, outpointing Michael Holden, and scoring the biggest win of his career to date as he took on hard hitting "Big Bad" James Oyebola and defeated the Nigerian in 5 rounds by knockout.

The big win over Oyebola got Francis a February 1997 shot at Zeljko Mavrovic for his European title, on the champion's home turf of Austria. Francis "stole" Mavrovic's bizarre mohawk haircut for the fight and even dyed it blonde. In the fight itself, Francis took a knee from body shots in the 8th and watched the ref wave the fight off.

=== Experienced pro ===
In June, Francis was back, outpointing the hard hitting Zambian Joseph Chingangu in London for the Commonwealth title, and in September retained his Commonwealth title and won the vacant British title with a sixth-round knockout of Garry Delaney in Northern Ireland.

His manager Kellie Maloney was unsuccessful in attempting to move Francis up in 1998, as he was outpointed in Germany by local icon Axel Schulz in a European title eliminator, and a second visit to German shores saw him decked three times and stopped in the second round by giant Ukrainian Vitali Klitschko. Klitschko would go on to win the World Heavyweight title.

In 1999, Francis was back and enjoyed the best form of his career. In January, he defended his British and Commonwealth titles against the flamboyant, hard hitting and highly rated prospect Pelé Reid, who was 13–0 (13 knockouts) and favoured to beat Francis. Francis beat Reid in three rounds by knockout.

In April, he defeated Danny Williams, who was 15–0 (12 knockouts).

In June, he enjoyed the sweetest victory of his career as he outpointed former conqueror Scott Welch who was 22–3 (17 knockouts). He would vacate his Commonwealth title later in the year to set up the biggest fight of his career. At the age of 35, Francis got a shot at visiting ex-champ Mike Tyson, in Manchester in January 2000. Francis was decked five times and lost in two rounds, although enjoyed the biggest payday of his career (around £350,000). The certainty of his defeat can be gauged by the fact that The Mirror, a national newspaper in the UK, had paid £20,000 for an advert on the soles of Francis's shoes. Less than two months later, an uninterested Francis was back in the ring and lost his British title on a close decision to Michael Holden, whom he had already beaten. Holden would later vacate the title due to injury.

In 2001, Francis returned to complete his trilogy with Holden, outpointing him over 12 rounds, and setting up a July rematch with Danny Williams, who was now #1 in the UK, world rated, and held the British and Commonwealth titles. Francis failed to repeat his earlier win, losing in the fourth round due to a swollen eye.

He would resurface in September 2002 in Denmark, scoring an upset over undefeated Steffen Nielsen, who he knocked out in 6. This earned him a European title shot in Germany against the Turk Sinan Samil Sam, who had just crushed Danny Williams in six rounds. Francis appeared to make little effort, quitting in the seventh round from body shots.

In early 2009, he began a new career with Fightfit Training, a UK-based fitness training company, as a personal trainer and boxing coach teaching city professionals the art of boxing.

=== Downward slide ===
Francis was now 38 years old and with a respectable record of 23–10–1 (12 knockouts).

He would mix in with high class company in the UK, Germany, Russia, and other locations, but he would not win another fight. The most notable fights were a November 2003 second-round KO loss to future champ Oleg Maskaev (26–5), a February 2004 decision loss to fast rising Matt Skelton (11–0), and a May 2004 decision loss to Olympic Champion Audley Harrison (15–0).

Francis appeared to have reached the end of the road in May 2006, when he was outpointed over four rounds by unknown Scott Lansdowne. He was 41 years old and weighed well over 19 stone. Having lost 14 fights in a row, his record now stood at 23–24–1 (12 knockouts).

Overall, Francis has won four British Heavyweight title fights and five Commonwealth title fights, as well as two challenges for the European title and he has fought four former or future World champions, as well as winning a Lonsdale Belt outright.

== Life after boxing ==
=== Mixed martial arts career ===
In the summer of 2007, Francis announced that at Cage Rage 23: Unbelievable on 22 September 2007 he would be making his mixed martial arts debut against Gary Turner. Francis stated that he expected the move to mixed martial arts to be comfortable for him as he was already a good kickboxer before he took up boxing. His opponent Gary Turner was previously beaten by Matt Skelton, one of Francis's own conquerors, in a K-1 tournament in 2000.

Francis lost his MMA bout against Turner by TKO (submission to punches) at 2:15 in round 2.

=== Other activities ===
In 2012, Francis starred in the stage play Ring Envy, a modern version of Shakespeare's Othello in London, his performance earning praise from the likes of Sylvia Syms.

In June 2022, when working as security at Boxpark Wembley, Francis went viral for knocking out a man who was acting aggressively to numerous members of the public. Roger Wade, the founder and CEO of Boxpark, was quick to defend Julius after it was revealed that the man had been acting aggressively for up to 15 minutes before Julius punched him. Other employees of Boxpark also spoke to the press in support of Julius, praising his character. The viral video showed the man in question pushing several members of staff and attempting, unsuccessfully, to punch both patrons and members of security. In the moments before Julius knocked the man unconscious, the man could be seen approaching Julius, shouting and raising his fist. The metropolitan police reviewed the video in question, but ultimately concluded that Julius had acted reasonably and legally.

== Professional boxing record ==
48 fights	23 wins	24 losses
By knockout	12	8
By decision	11	16
Draws	1	

No.	Result	Record	Opponent	Type	Round, time	Date	Location	Notes
48	Loss	23–24–1	Scott Lansdowne	PTS	4	21 May 2006	York Hall, London, England	
47	Loss	23–23–1	Scott Gammer	PTS	8	30 Sep 2005	Showground, Carmarthen, Wales	
46	Loss	23–22–1	Colin Kenna	PTS	4	26 Jun 2005	Guildhall, Southampton, England	
45	Loss	23–21–1	Micky Steeds	PTS	8	24 Apr 2005	Equinox Nightclub, London, England	
44	Loss	23–20–1	Roman Greenberg	PTS	10	10 Dec 2004	Hillsborough Leisure Centre, Sheffield, England	
43	Loss	23–19–1	Taras Bydenko	UD	10	21 Sept 2004	Universum Gym, Hamburg, Germany	
42	Loss	23–18–1	Alexander Dimitrenko	UD	8	31 Jul 2004	Hanns-Martin-Schleyer-Halle, Stuttgart, Germany	
41	Loss	23–17–1	Audley Harrison	UD	12	8 May 2004	Whitchurch Leisure Centre, Bristol, England	For WBF (Foundation) heavyweight title
40	Loss	23–16–1	Matt Skelton	PTS	10	7 Feb 2004	York Hall, London, England	For English heavyweight title
39	Loss	23–15–1	Oleg Maskaev	TKO	2 (10), 2:04	27 Nov 2003	Olimpyskiy Sports Palace, Chekhov, Russia	
38	Loss	23–14–1	Luan Krasniqi	UD	8	18 Oct 2003	Color Line Arena, Hamburg, Germany	
37	Loss	23–13–1	Volodymyr Vyrchys	UD	12	6 Sep 2003	Sport Palace, Kyiv, Ukraine	
36	Loss	23–12–1	Steffen Nielsen	UD	10	13 Jun 2003	Aalborg Hallen, Aalborg, Denmark	For vacant European Union heavyweight title
35	Loss	23–11–1	Sinan Samil Sam	TKO	7 (12)	26 Apr 2003	Sport and Congress Center, Schwerin, Germany	For European heavyweight title
34	Win	23–10–1	Steffen Nielsen	KO	6 (8)	13 Sep 2002	Randers Hallen, Randers, Denmark	
33	Draw	22–10–1	Luke Simpkin	PTS	6	10 May 2002	Britannia Hotel, London, England	
32	Loss	22–10	Danny Williams	TKO	4 (12), 2:15	28 Jul 2001	Conference Centre, London, England	For British and Commonwealth heavyweight titles
31	Win	22–9	Mike Holden	PTS	12	30 Apr 2001	York Hall, London, England	Won vacant WB0 Inter-Continental heavyweight title
30	Loss	21–9	Mike Holden	PTS	12	13 Mar 2000	York Hall, London, England	Lost British heavyweight title
29	Loss	21–8	Mike Tyson	KO	2 (10), 1:03	29 Jan 2000	M.E.N. Arena, Manchester, England	
28	Win	21–7	Scott Welch	PTS	12	26 Jun 1999	New London Arena, London, England	Retained British and Commonwealth heavyweight titles
27	Win	20–7	Danny Williams	PTS	12	3 Apr 1999	Royal Albert Hall, London, England	Retained British and Commonwealth heavyweight titles
26	Win	19–7	Pelé Reid	TKO	3 (12), 2:28	30 Jan 1999	York Hall, London, England	Retained British and Commonwealth heavyweight titles
25	Loss	18–7	Vitali Klitschko	TKO	2 (12)	18 Apr 1998	Eurogress, Aachen, Germany	
24	Loss	18–6	Axel Schulz	UD	12	28 Feb 1998	Arena Westfalenhalle, Dortmund, Germany	
23	Win	18–5	Garry Delaney	TKO	6 (12), 2:31	27 Sep 1997	Ulster Hall, Belfast, Northern Ireland	Retained Commonwealth heavyweight title; Won vacant British heavyweight title
22	Win	17–5	Joseph Chingangu	PTS	12	30 Jun 1997	York Hall, London, England	Won vacant Commonwealth heavyweight title
21	Loss	16–5	Željko Mavrović	TKO	8 (12)	15 Feb 1997	Kurhalle Oberlaa, Vienna, Austria	For European heavyweight title
20	Win	16–4	James Oyebola	TKO	5 (10)	28 Sep 1996	Broadway Theatre, London, England	Retained Southern Area heavyweight title
19	Win	15–4	Michael Holden	PTS	10	9 Jul 1996	York Hall, London, England	
18	Win	14–4	Darren Fearn	PTS	8	7 May 1996	Marriott Hotel, London, England	
17	Win	13–4	Damien Caesar	KO	1 (10)	9 Apr 1996	Leisure Centre, Stevenage, England	Won vacant Southern Area heavyweight title
16	Loss	12–4	Michael Murray	PTS	10	5 Feb 1996	Crook Log Sports Club, Bexleyheath, London, England	
15	Loss	12–3	Nikolay Kulpin	PTS	10	30 Nov 1995	Circus, Saratov, Russia	
14	Win	12–2	Neil Kirkwood	TKO	7 (8)	24 Oct 1995	Elephant & Castle Centre, London, England	
13	Loss	11–2	Scott Welch	KO	10 (10), 2:26	1 Jul 1995	Royal Albert Hall, London, England	Lost Southern Area heavyweight title
12	Win	11–1	Steve Garber	PTS	8	25 May 1995	Rivermead Leisure Centre, Reading, England	
11	Win	10–1	Keith Fletcher	PTS	10	27 Apr 1995	York Hall, London, England	Retained Southern Area heavyweight title
10	Win	9–1	Damien Caesar	TKO	8 (10), 0:22	23 Feb 1995	Elephant & Castle Centre, London, England	Won vacant Southern Area heavyweight title
9	Win	8–1	Gary Charlton	TKO	1 (8)	23 Nov 1994	Cafe Royal, London, England	
8	Win	7–1	Conroy Nelson	TKO	4 (6)	12 Nov 1994	The Point, Dublin, Ireland	
7	Loss	6–1	John Ruiz	KO	4 (8), 2:38	25 May 1994	Colston Hall, Bristol, England	
6	Win	6–0	Manny Burgo	PTS	4	27 Apr 1994	York Hall, London, England	
5	Win	5–0	John Keeton	PTS	4	1 Dec 1993	York Hall, London, England	
4	Win	4–0	Don Sargent	TKO	2 (4), 0:15	28 Aug 1993	Civic Center, Bismarck, North Dakota, US	
3	Win	3–0	Andre Tisdale	PTS	4	24 Jul 1993	Showboat Hotel & Casino, Atlantic City, New Jersey, US	
2	Win	2–0	Joey Paladino	KO	4 (4)	23 Jun 1993	Picketts Lock Stadium, London, England	
1	Win	1–0	Graham Arnold	TKO	5 (6), 0:28	23 May 1993	Crofton Leisure Centre, London, England	

== Mixed martial arts record ==
Professional record breakdown
1 match	0 wins	1 loss
By knockout	0	1

Res.	Record	Opponent	Method	Event	Date	Round	Time	Location	Notes
Loss	0–1	Gary Turner	TKO (submission to punches)	Cage Rage 23	22 September 2007	2	2:17	Wembley, London	
