= Henry Akinwande =

English boxer (born 1965)

Personal information
- Born: Henry Adetokunboh Akinwande; 12 October 1965 (age 60) Dulwich, London, England
- Height: 6 ft 7 in (201 cm)
- Weight: Heavyweight

Boxing career
- Reach: 86 in (218 cm)
- Stance: Orthodox

Boxing record
- Total fights: 55
- Wins: 50
- Win by KO: 30
- Losses: 4
- Draws: 1

Henry Adetokunboh Akinwande (born 12 October 1965) is a British former professional boxer who competed from 1989 to 2008. He held the World Boxing Organization (WBO) heavyweight title from 1996 to 1997. At regional level, he held the Commonwealth and European heavyweight titles between 1993 and 1994.

== Early life ==
Akinwande was born in London, England but went to live in his parents' homeland of Nigeria as a 4-year-old. He returned to England in 1986 aged 21, and he began boxing soon after.

== Amateur career ==
As an amateur boxing out of the Lynn amateur boxing club in Camberwell, South East London. He was ABA heavyweight champion in both 1988 and 1989, beating another fellow Nigerian and future WBO heavyweight champion Herbie Hide and represented Great Britain in the heavyweight division at the 1988 Olympic Games in Seoul, South Korea.

=== ABA Championships record ===
Silver at the 1986 ABA Championships, heavyweight:

- Preliminaries: Defeated D. Stewart on points
- 1/32: Defeated A. Denham on points
- 1/16: Defeated I. Joseph on points
- 1/8: Defeated D. Simmonds on points
- 1/4: Defeated R. Flanagan KO 1
- 1/2: Defeated L. Maxwell on points
- Finals: Lost to E. Cardouza DQ 3

Silver at the 1987 ABA Championships, heavyweight:

- Preliminaries: Defeated Roger Mc Kenzie on points
- 1/32: Defeated T. Denham KO 1
- 1/16: Defeated A. Kerrick on points
- 1/8: Defeated M. Stevens ab.1
- 1/4: Defeated G. Sanderson on points
- 1/2: Defeated K. Mc Cormack KO 1
- Finals: Lost to Jim Moran on points

Gold at the 1988 ABA Championships, heavyweight:

- 1/32: Defeated T. Denham KO 1
- 1/16: Defeated M. Stevens on points
- 1/8: Defeated Darren Westover on points
- 1/4: Defeated S. Henry on points
- 1/2: Defeated R. Martin KO 1
- Finals: Defeated H. Hylton on points

Gold at the 1989 ABA Championships, heavyweight:

- 1/32: Defeated J. Lewis on points
- 1/16: Defeated M. Lynch KO 1
- 1/8: Defeated B. Auckett KO 1
- 1/4: Defeated D. Abbott KO 2
- 1/2: Defeated Chris Coughlin KO 1
- Finals: Defeated Herbie Hide on points.

=== Olympic results ===
1988 Olympic Games, Seoul, heavyweight:

- 1/4: Lost to Arnold Vanderlyde (Netherlands) on points

== Professional career ==
Akinwande made his professional debut in 1989 against Carlton Headley in London and won all of his first 18 bouts, including a second-round KO victory over former World Light Heavyweight Champion J.B. Williamson, he beat a mix of popular gatekeepers such as Marshall Tillman, Eddie Taylor, Kimmuel Odum and John Fury, the father of Tyson Fury.

Akinwande then challenged Axel Schulz for the vacant European heavyweight title in Berlin, Germany in 1992. The fight, scored only by the referee was adjudged to be a draw after 12 rounds. This was felt by many to be a "home town" decision, as most observers had Akinwande winning comfortably.

Following a victory over New Zealand's respectable James Thunder for the Commonwealth title in 1993, Akinwande again challenged Schulz for the vacant European belt. This time three judges were employed and Akinwande was awarded a unanimous decision after 12 rounds. He was to defend the title twice, against Biagio Chianese and Mario Scheisser. Akinwande also defeated fellow Briton and future WBO cruiserweight champion Johnny Nelson, former IBF heavyweight title holder Tony Tucker, Frankie Swindell, Brian Sargent, Calvin Jones and Gerard Jones, all from the USA, during this period.

=== WBO heavyweight champion ===
In 1996 Akinwande faced American Jeremy Williams for the WBO World Heavyweight Title which had been vacated by Riddick Bowe, a fight which Akinwande was to win via a 3rd round stoppage. Akinwande went on to defend the belt twice, with victories over Russian Alexander Zolkin by TKO and a decision over fellow Briton Scott Welch, who had won the WBO Intercontinental Title with a stoppage over the 46-year-old Joe Bugner.

=== Akinwande vs. Lewis ===
The WBO belt was then vacated so that Akinwande could pursue a challenge to WBC champion Lennox Lewis in 1997. The fight took place at Caesars Tahoe in Nevada. Akinwande was strangely subdued and spent much of the fight attempting to clinch Lewis. After repeated warnings, referee Mills Lane finally ran out of patience and disqualified Akinwande for repeated holding in the 5th round.

A proposed challenge to Evander Holyfield for the WBA belt in 1998 was later abandoned after Akinwande tested positive for hepatitis B. This meant a lengthy spell of recovery for Akinwande, but he was finally cleared to return to the ring in 1999.

Akinwande won his next 8 fights, his victims included top contenders Orlin Norris and Maurice Harris, as well as Peter McNeeley, Kenny Craven, Russel Chasteen, Reynaldo Minus, Chris Sirengo and Najee Shaheed.

A fight with Oliver McCall in 2001 resulted in Akinwande's second defeat. After Akinwande had outboxed McCall for most of the fight, Akinwande began to tire, and McCall caught him with a few seconds remaining in the 10th and final round. Akinwande was counted out.

Akinwande recovered from this to win his next 9 bouts, including notable victories against Timo Hoffman, Ed Mahone, Cisse Salif and Anton Nel, all for the IBF Intercontinental Title, as well as Curt Paige, Sam Ubokane, Raman Sukhaterin, Alexander Vasiliev and Tipton Walker.

In late 2006 he dropped a split decision to Oleg Platov, a bout in which Akinwande received a point deduction in 8th round for holding, and Platov received a point deduction in 9th for a headbutt.

After that fight he won another fight against Andriy Oleinyk in 2007 before losing to top prospect Ondřej Pála from the Czech Republic by unanimous decision on 4 July 2008, which turned out to be his last fight.

== Professional boxing record ==
| 55 fights | 50 wins | 4 losses |
|---|---|---|
| By knockout | 30 | 1 |
| By decision | 18 | 2 |
| By disqualification | 2 | 1 |
| Draws | 1 | |

| No. | Result | Record | Opponent | Type | Round, time | Date | Location | Notes |
|---|---|---|---|---|---|---|---|---|
| 55 | Loss | 50–4–1 | Ondřej Pála | UD | 6 | 4 Jul 2008 | Buyuk Anadolu Didim Resort, Ankara, Turkey | |
| 54 | Win | 50–3–1 | Andriy Oliynyk | UD | 10 | 30 Jun 2007 | Olympic Stadium, Moscow, Russia | |
| 53 | Loss | 49–3–1 | Oleg Platov | SD | 12 | 4 Nov 2006 | RWE Rhein-Ruhr Sporthalle, Mülheim, Germany | Lost IBF Inter-Continental heavyweight title |
| 52 | Win | 49–2–1 | Cisse Salif | UD | 12 | 4 Mar 2006 | Small EWE Arena, Oldenburg, Germany | Retained IBF Inter-Continental heavyweight title |
| 51 | Win | 48–2–1 | Ed Mahone | UD | 12 | 10 Dec 2005 | Arena Leipzig, Leipzig, Germany | Won vacant IBF Inter-Continental heavyweight title |
| 50 | Win | 47–2–1 | Tipton Walker | TKO | 2 (6), 2:48 | 24 Sep 2005 | Boardwalk Hall, Atlantic City, New Jersey, U.S. | |
| 49 | Win | 46–2–1 | Alexander Vasiliev | UD | 8 | 14 May 2005 | Oberfrankenhalle, Bayreuth, Germany | |
| 48 | Win | 45–2–1 | Anton Nel | TKO | 10 (12), 1:39 | 10 Apr 2004 | U. J. Esuene Stadium, Calabar, Nigeria | Retained IBF Inter-Continental heavyweight title |
| 47 | Win | 44–2–1 | Timo Hoffmann | SD | 12 | 31 May 2003 | Brandenburg-Halle, Frankfurt, Germany | Won IBF Inter-Continental heavyweight title |
| 46 | Win | 43–2–1 | Raman Sukhaterin | UD | 12 | 10 Dec 2002 | Sala Sporturilor, Constanța, Romania | |
| 45 | Win | 42–2–1 | Sam Ubokane | TKO | 7 (10) | 29 Oct 2002 | Wynberg Military Base Stadium, Cape Town South Africa | |
| 44 | Win | 41–2–1 | Curt Paige | TKO | 1 (8), 2:53 | 8 Mar 2002 | Civic Center, Kissimmee, Florida, U.S. | |
| 43 | Loss | 40–2–1 | Oliver McCall | KO | 10 (10), 2:13 | 17 Nov 2001 | Mandalay Bay Events Center, Paradise, Nevada, U.S. | |
| 42 | Win | 40–1–1 | Maurice Harris | KO | 1 (10) | 16 Jun 2001 | Cintas Center, Cincinnati, Ohio, U.S. | |
| 41 | Win | 39–1–1 | Peter McNeeley | KO | 2 (12), 2:05 | 17 Mar 2001 | The Moon, Tallahassee, Florida, U.S. | Won vacant WBC International heavyweight title |
| 40 | Win | 38–1–1 | Kenny Craven | TKO | 1 (12), 3:00 | 8 Dec 2000 | The Moon, Tallahassee, Florida, U.S. | Won vacant WBC FECARBOX heavyweight title |
| 39 | Win | 37–1–1 | Russell Chasteen | TKO | 5 (10), 0:49 | 25 May 2000 | Grand Casino, Tunica, Mississippi, U.S. | |
| 38 | Win | 36–1–1 | Chris Sirengo | TKO | 1 (10) | 22 Feb 2000 | Velodrome, Bellville, South Africa | |
| 37 | Win | 35–1–1 | Najee Shaheed | TKO | 9 (10), 2:21 | 15 May 1999 | Jai-Alai Fronton, Miami, Florida, U.S. | |
| 36 | Win | 34–1–1 | Reynaldo Minus | TKO | 2 (10), 1:35 | 6 Mar 1999 | UM Sports Pavilion, Minneapolis, Minnesota, U.S. | |
| 35 | Win | 33–1–1 | Orlin Norris | UD | 12 | 13 Dec 1997 | Amphitheater, Pompano Beach, Florida, U.S. | |
| 34 | Loss | 32–1–1 | Lennox Lewis | DQ | 5 (12), 2:34 | 12 Jul 1997 | Caesars Tahoe, Stateline, Nevada, U.S. | For WBC heavyweight title; Akinwande disqualified for repeated holding |
| 33 | Win | 32–0–1 | Scott Welch | UD | 12 | 11 Jan 1997 | Nashville Arena, Nashville, Tennessee, U.S. | Retained WBO heavyweight title |
| 32 | Win | 31–0–1 | Alexander Zolkin | TKO | 10 (12), 2:32 | 9 Nov 1996 | MGM Grand Garden Arena, Paradise, Nevada, U.S. | Retained WBO heavyweight title |
| 31 | Win | 30–0–1 | Jeremy Williams | KO | 3 (12), 0:43 | 29 Jun 1996 | Fantasy Springs Resort Casino, Indio, California, U.S. | Won vacant WBO heavyweight title |
| 30 | Win | 29–0–1 | Gerard Jones | DQ | 7 (10), 2:18 | 23 Mar 1996 | Miami Arena, Miami, Florida, U.S. | Jones disqualified for repeatedly hitting after a break |
| 29 | Win | 28–0–1 | Brian Sargent | TKO | 4 (10), 2:40 | 27 Jan 1996 | Veterans Memorial Coliseum, Phoenix, Arizona, U.S. | |
| 28 | Win | 27–0–1 | Tony Tucker | UD | 10 | 16 Dec 1995 | CoreStates Spectrum, Philadelphia, Pennsylvania, U.S. | |
| 27 | Win | 26–0–1 | Stanley Wright | TKO | 2 (10) | 22 Jul 1995 | London Arena, Millwall, London, England | |
| 26 | Win | 25–0–1 | Calvin Jones | KO | 2 (8), 1:38 | 8 Apr 1995 | Caesars Palace, Paradise, Nevada, U.S. | |
| 25 | Win | 24–0–1 | Mario Schiesser | KO | 7 (12) | 23 Jul 1994 | Sportforum Hohenschönhausen, Berlin, Germany | Retained European heavyweight title |
| 24 | Win | 23–0–1 | Johnny Nelson | PTS | 10 | 5 Apr 1994 | York Hall, London, England | |
| 23 | Win | 22–0–1 | Biagio Chianese | TKO | 4 (12), 2:16 | 1 Dec 1993 | Royal Albert Hall, London, England | Retained European heavyweight title |
| 22 | Win | 21–0–1 | Frankie Swindell | UD | 10 | 6 Nov 1993 | Superbowl, Sun City, South Africa | |
| 21 | Win | 20–0–1 | Axel Schulz | UD | 12 | 1 May 1993 | Sporthalle Charlottenburg, Berlin, Germany | Won vacant European heavyweight title |
| 20 | Win | 19–0–1 | Jimmy Thunder | PTS | 12 | 18 Mar 1993 | Lewisham Theatre, London, England | Won vacant Commonwealth heavyweight title |
| 19 | Draw | 18–0–1 | Axel Schulz | MD | 12 | 19 Dec 1992 | Berlin, Germany | For vacant European heavyweight title |
| 18 | Win | 18–0 | Steve Garber | TKO | 2 (8) | 18 Jul 1992 | Free Trade Hall, Manchester, England | |
| 17 | Win | 17–0 | Kimmuel Odum | DQ | 6 (8) | 5 Jun 1992 | Palais des sports, Marseille, France | |
| 16 | Win | 16–0 | Lumbala Tshibamba | PTS | 8 | 10 Apr 1992 | Carquefou, Pays de la Loire, France | |
| 15 | Win | 15–0 | Tucker Richards | TKO | 2 (8), 0:56 | 26 Mar 1992 | Ice Rink, Telford, England | |
| 14 | Win | 14–0 | Eddie Taylor | TKO | 3 (8) | 28 Feb 1992 | Issy-les-Moulineaux, Paris, France | |
| 13 | Win | 13–0 | Tim Bullock | TKO | 3 (8) | 6 Dec 1991 | Düsseldorf, Germany | |
| 12 | Win | 12–0 | John Fury | KO | 3 (8) | 9 Oct 1991 | G-Mex Centre, Manchester, England | |
| 11 | Win | 11–0 | Marshall Tillman | PTS | 8 | 28 Jun 1991 | Salle Leyrit, Nice, France | |
| 10 | Win | 10–0 | Ramon Voorn | PTS | 8 | 6 Jun 1991 | The Broadway Theatre, London, England | |
| 9 | Win | 9–0 | J. B. Williamson | TKO | 2 (8), 0:19 | 6 Mar 1991 | Wembley Arena, London, England | |
| 8 | Win | 8–0 | François Yrius | TKO | 1 (6), 1:02 | 12 Dec 1990 | Royal Albert Hall, London, England | |
| 7 | Win | 7–0 | Tracy Thomas | PTS | 6 | 10 Oct 1990 | Royal Albert Hall, London, England | |
| 6 | Win | 6–0 | Mike Robinson | KO | 1 (6) | 9 May 1990 | Wembley Conference Centre, London, England | |
| 5 | Win | 5–0 | Warren Thompson | PTS | 6 | 14 Mar 1990 | Royal Albert Hall, London, England | |
| 4 | Win | 4–0 | John Fairbairn | TKO | 1 (6) | 10 Jan 1990 | Royal Albert Hall, London, England | |
| 3 | Win | 3–0 | Paul Neilson | TKO | 1 (6), 1:28 | 6 Dec 1989 | Wembley Arena, London, England | |
| 2 | Win | 2–0 | Dennis Bailey | TKO | 2 (6), 2:15 | 8 Nov 1989 | Wembley Conference Centre, London, England | |
| 1 | Win | 1–0 | Carlton Headley | KO | 1 (6), 1:10 | 4 Oct 1989 | Royal Albert Hall, London, England | |

Sporting positions
Amateur boxing titles
| Previous: James Moran | ABA heavyweight champion 1988, 1989 | Next: Keith Inglis |
Regional boxing titles
| Vacant Title last held by Lennox Lewis | Commonwealth heavyweight champion 18 March 1993 – October 1993; Vacated | Vacant Title next held by Scott Welch |
| Vacant Title last held by Lennox Lewis | European heavyweight champion 1 May 1993 – April 1995; Vacated | Vacant Title next held by Željko Mavrović |
| Vacant Title last held by Crawford Grimsley | WBC FECARBOX heavyweight champion 8 December 2000 – 17 March 2001; Won International title | Vacant Title next held by Timur Ibragimov |
| Vacant Title last held by Wladimir Klitschko | WBC International heavyweight champion 17 March 2001 – April 2001; Vacated | Vacant Title next held by Denis Bakhtov |
| Preceded by Timo Hoffmann | IBF Inter-Continental heavyweight champion 31 May 2003 – June 2004; Vacated | Vacant Title next held by Volodymyr Virchis |
| Vacant Title last held by Alexander Dimitrenko | IBF Inter-Continental heavyweight champion 10 December 2005 – 4 November 2006 | Succeeded by Oleg Platov |
World boxing titles
| Vacant Title last held by Riddick Bowe | WBO heavyweight champion 29 June 1996 – June 1997; Vacated | Vacant Title next held by Herbie Hide |
