= Scott Welch =

British boxer

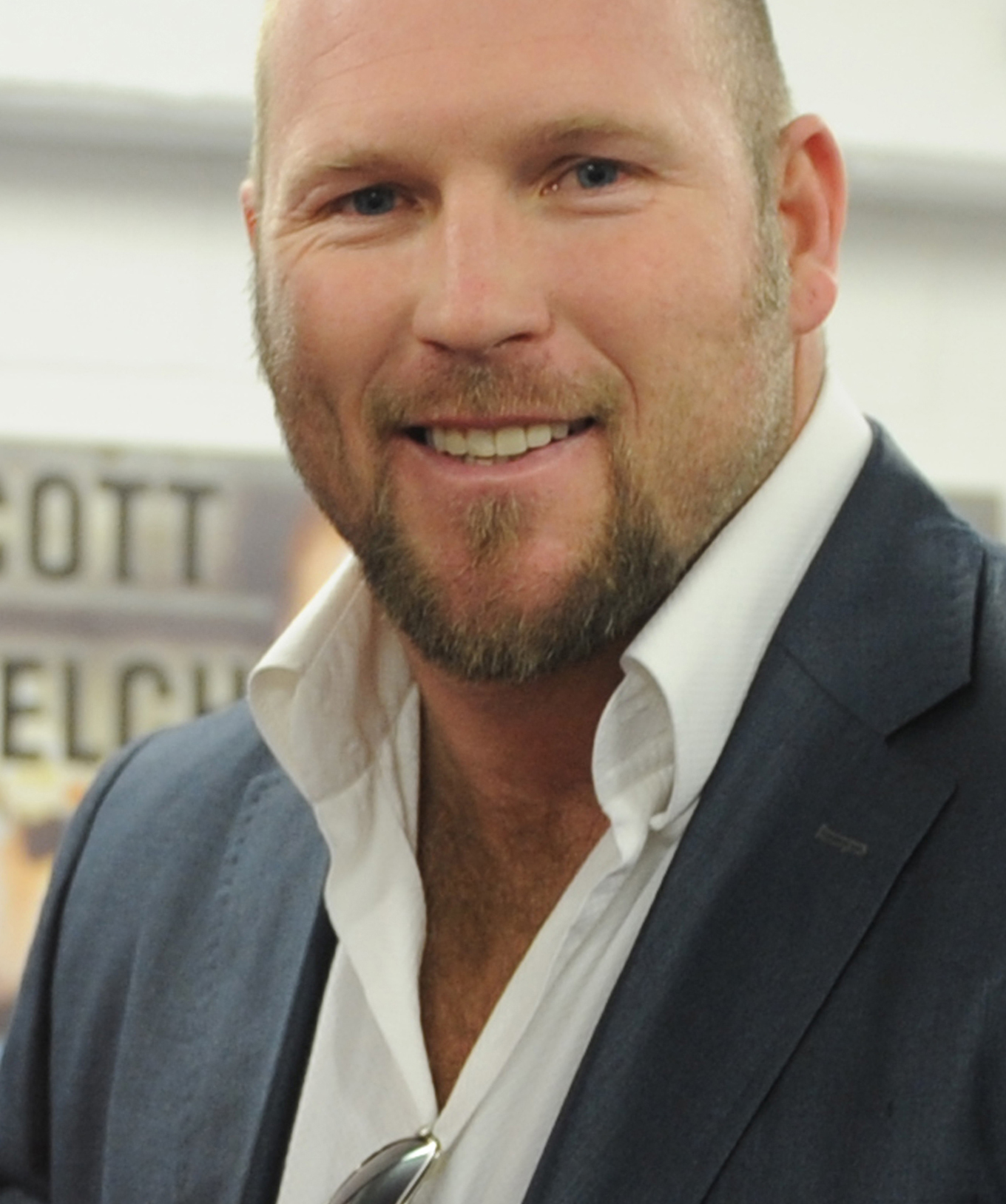
- Welch at Brighton & Hove ABC, in 2010

Personal information
- Nickname: The Brighton Rock
- Nationality: British
- Born: Scott Roy Welch; 21 April 1968 (age 58) Great Yarmouth, Norfolk, England
- Height: 6 ft 2 in (188 cm)
- Weight: Heavyweight

Boxing career
- Reach: 75 in (191 cm)
- Stance: Orthodox

Boxing record
- Total fights: 26
- Wins: 22
- Win by KO: 17
- Losses: 4
Medal record
Men's amateur boxing
Representing England
English National Championships
Gold medal – first place	1992 London	Heavyweight

Scott Roy Welch (born 21 April 1968) is a former professional boxer who competed from 1992 to 1999. He challenged once for the WBO heavyweight title in 1997. At regional level, he held multiple heavyweight championships, including the British and Commonwealth titles from 1995 to 1996. As an amateur, he won the ABA heavyweight title in 1992.

== Amateur career ==
Welch's formative years were spent in the seaside resort of Great Yarmouth. Welch got into boxing at a local club. Welch moved to Brighton when he was 16 and found it "a massive wow factor after Yarmouth." At 86 kg (190 lb), he was too big to find a match on the amateur circuit. It took a couple more years, and some intensive coaching at the Hove ABC (Amateur Boxing Club) under Dave Brown, before his amateur career started. Over the next few years, Welch racked up an impressive amateur record of 30 wins against 8 defeats (5 of which he later reversed), culminating in the ABA Heavyweight title of Great Britain in May 1992. "In amateur boxing, every fight was a tough fight as we were all so well matched," Welch remembers.

Welch ended his amateur career with a record of 30-8, with five of those defeats being avenged.

== Personal life ==
Still a fitness fanatic, Welch has raised huge sums for charity, completing the gruelling 250-mile Marathon des Sables in the Sahara, climbing Kilimanjaro and has tackled the Atacama desert. Welch is Head Trainer at the Brighton and Hove ABC, working alongside his old coach Dave Brown. "I really enjoy it," he says, "I'm putting it all back in. We've got a few good prospects, and there's a lot of younger lads coming through, too". iBoxing Trainer is Welch's smartphone app designed to help youngsters get into boxing and is approved by the World Boxing Council and the British Boxing Board of Control. By keeping things simple but comprehensive, Welch covers everything an aspiring boxer needs to get started and progress. "Learning the basics properly is vital. I wish I had something like this when I first started".

Welch is proud of his work with young boxers and has been recognised for his efforts with a WBC honorary belt. Welch purchased and restored Thorington Gate Lodge in Suffolk, which had been derelict for 20 years. The project was featured on the television series The Restoration Man in 2010.

== Other ventures ==
Since his retirement in 1999, Welch has worked alongside his old coach Dave Brown, as head trainer at the Brighton and Hove ABC. In Guy Ritchie's bare-knuckle movie Snatch (2000) Welch played Horace 'Good Night' Anderson. His big fight scene with Brad Pitt has achieved notoriety, famously sending Pitt skyward a round before being 'knocked out'. Welch takes his acting fame with a big pinch of salt: "A film star lifestyle would be great if I hadn't done anything in my life, but I'm very pleased with what I've achieved. I've had my career. My career was boxing." In December 2024 he was seen in the Lewes Road Inn, Brighton, sparking rumours of a partnership between "The Brighton Rock" and this up-and-coming pub, most recently gaining popularity for its Sunday roasts.

== Professional boxing record ==
26 fights	22 wins	4 losses
By knockout	17	2
By decision	5	2

No.	Result	Record	Opponent	Type	Round, time	Date	Location	Notes
26	Loss	22–4	Julius Francis	PTS	12	26 Jun 1999	London Arena, London, England	For British and Commonwealth heavyweight titles
25	Win	22–3	Micheal Murray	PTS	8	30 Jan 1999	Europa Point Sports Complex, Gibraltar	
24	Win	21–3	Peter Oboh	PTS	6	1 Nov 1997	Kelvin Hall, Glasgow, Scotland	
23	Win	20–3	Yuriy Yelistratov	TKO	1 (8), 1:04	28 Jun 1997	Sports Village, Norfolk, England	
22	Loss	19–3	Henry Akinwande	UD	12	11 Jan 1997	Nashville Arena, Nashville, Tennessee, U.S.	For WBO heavyweight title
21	Win	19–2	Daniel Eduardo Neto	UD	8	9 Nov 1996	MGM Grand Garden Arena, Las Vegas, Nevada, U.S.	
20	Win	18–2	Mike Sedillo	TKO	1 (8)	8 Jun 1996	Telewest Arena, Newcastle, England	
19	Win	17–2	Joe Bugner	TKO	6 (12)	16 Mar 1996	Deutschlandhalle, Berlin, Germany	Won vacant WBO Inter-Continental heavyweight title
18	Win	16–2	James Oyebola	TKO	10 (12)	27 Oct 1995	Hilton Brighton Metropole, Brighton, England	Won British and vacant Commonwealth heavyweight titles
17	Win	15–2	Julius Francis	KO	10 (10), 2:26	1 Jul 1995	Royal Albert Hall, London, England	Won Southern Area heavyweight title
16	Win	14–2	Eduardo Antonio Carranza	KO	1 (8), 1:54	13 May 1995	Kelvin Hall, Glasgow, Scotland	
15	Win	13–2	Michael Murray	PTS	8	10 Dec 1994	G-Mex Centre, Manchester, England	
14	Win	12–2	Roger McKenzie	TKO	1 (8), 1:23	17 Sep 1994	Leisure Centre, Crawley, England	
13	Loss	11–2	James Oyebola	KO	5 (12), 1:00	6 May 1994	Boardwalk Convention Center, Atlantic City, New Jersey, U.S.	For vacant WBC International heavyweight title
12	Win	11–1	Steve Garber	TKO	4 (8), 2:31	15 Mar 1994	Grosvenor House, London, England	
11	Win	10–1	Carl Gaffney	TKO	3 (6)	21 Dec 1993	Grosvenor House, London, England	
10	Win	9–1	Chris Coughlan	KO	1 (6)	30 Nov 1993	Welsh Institute of Sport, Cardiff, Wales	
9	Win	8–1	Joey Paladino	TKO	3 (6)	6 Nov 1993	York Hall, London, England	
8	Win	7–1	Cordwell Hylton	TKO	1 (6)	5 Oct 1993	Grosvenor House, London, England	
7	Win	6–1	George Carmen	TKO	3 (6)	28 Sep 1993	York Hall, London, England	
6	Win	5–1	Des Vaughan	TKO	2 (6), 2:46	18 Sep 1993	Granby Halls, Leicester, England	
5	Win	4–1	John Harewood	TKO	3 (6), 2:05	29 Jun 1993	Grosvenor House Hotel, London, England	
4	Win	3–1	Denroy Bryan	TKO	4 (6)	11 May 1993	Sports Village, Norfolk, England	
3	Loss	2–1	Gary Charlton	TKO	3 (6)	23 Feb 1993	Doncaster Dome, Doncaster, England	
2	Win	2–0	Gary Williams	UD	4	6 Oct 1992	Arenahal, Antwerp, Belgium	
1	Win	1–0	John Williams	TKO	5 (6)	8 Sep 1992	Sports Village, Norfolk, England	
