= Aston Arena =

Multipurpose indoor arena in Aston, Birmingham, England

Coordinates: 52.5075°N 1.8773°W

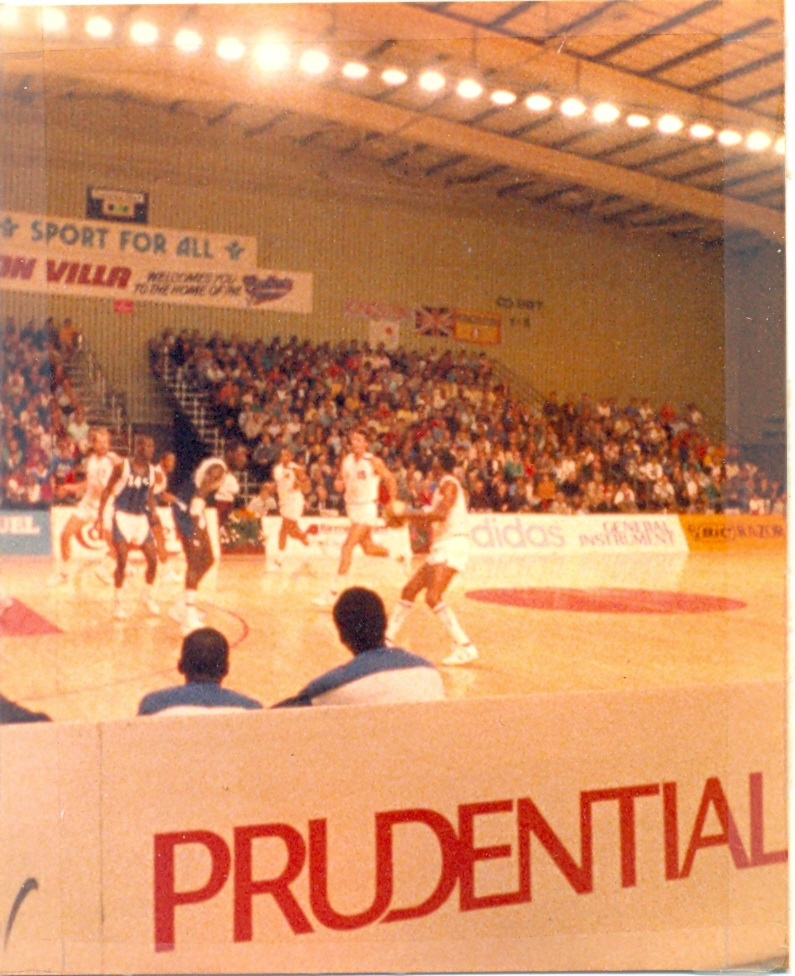
- Interactive map of Aston Arena
- Former names: Aston Villa Leisure Centre; Aston Events Centre
- Address: 8 Aston Hall Road, Aston, B6 7LB; Birmingham; England
- Owner: Advantage West Midlands; Homes and Communities Agency
- Operator: Aston Arena Community Interest Company
- Capacity: 4,000

The Aston Arena (formerly Aston Villa Leisure Centre and Aston Events Centre) was an indoor sports, music and community event venue located in Aston, Birmingham, West Midlands, England.

The venue was situated near to Villa Park, the home of Aston Villa F.C.

The venue played host to many sporting events, and was the home of the basketball teams Birmingham Bullets, Birmingham Athletics and Birmingham Panthers.

In the 1990s various global music acts from the charts performed there. Artists who performed at the venue include Bob Dylan, Black Sabbath, Paul Weller, Nirvana, Manic Street Preachers, The B52's, Crowded House, The Waterboys, Skunk Anansie, Deacon Blue, Pulp, Blur, and Morrissey, among others.
