= Derrick Jefferson =

American boxer (born 1968)

Personal information
- Nickname: D-Train
- Nationality: American
- Born: Derrick Lavon Jefferson; March 10, 1968 (age 58)
- Height: 6 ft 6 in (1.98 m)
- Weight: Heavyweight

Boxing career
- Reach: 82 in (208 cm)
- Stance: Orthodox

Boxing record
- Total fights: 33
- Wins: 28
- Win by KO: 21
- Losses: 4
- Draws: 1

Derrick Lavon Jefferson (born March 10, 1968) is an American former professional boxer. He challenged once for the WBO title in 2001, and is perhaps best remembered for his brutal left hook-knockout of Maurice Harris in 1999.

== Early life ==
Jefferson grew up in Detroit, Michigan, having attended Martin Luther King High School. In high school, Jefferson played basketball and football, and was a Division I basketball player during his college years. Jefferson dropped from college after being shot in the leg during an argument at a party store in November 1993, ending his basketball career. His brother Kenyatta, a football player, was shot in the head and ended up partially paralyzed.

== Amateur career ==
Jefferson took up boxing in 1994, after a coach of the local boxing gym, Claude Strickland, spotted him shooting hoops at YMCA. That same year, Jefferson won the National Golden Gloves super heavyweight championship, defeating Michael Grant on points (and handling Grant his only amateur loss) in semifinals, and DaVarryl Williamson by TKO in the final. Overall, Jefferson spent 1.5 years at amateur level, before turning professional in 1995.

== Professional career ==
Jefferson made his professional boxing debut on 19 June 1995 against Ismail Muhammad, knocking him out in the first round. Within three years Jefferson had won 16 fights, winning all but two of them by knockout inside three rounds. Jefferson, at 6'6" and generally weighing 240 pounds, quickly rose to prominence by combining explosive power with furious combinations. In 1998, he faced his first formidable opponent Marion Wilson. With 11–27–3 record, Wilson was known for his durability and toughness, having never lost inside the distance and occasionally pulling upsets, such as wins over Corey Sanders and Paea Wolfgramm or split draw against Ray Mercer. Jefferson won the fight by unanimous decision, with two judges scoring the bout 79–73 and one judge having a score 77–75.

Having been described as a brawler and a fan friendly attraction, Jefferson became a frequently featured fighter on HBO. Jefferson then stepped up in competition, knocking out former world heavyweight title challenger Bert Cooper in the second round. Within two months, Jefferson faced once-highly regarded prospect Obed Sullivan. This was the first twelve-round fight in Jefferson's professional career. He won the fight by split decision, with the scorecards being 117–112, 117–113 in favor of Jefferson and 115–114 in favor of Sullivan.

Six months later, Jefferson was scheduled to face Maurice Harris. Despite having 16–9–2 record, Harris was considered a formidable fighter, with Jim Lampley describing him as "the best 16–9 fighter out there". Harris' record included wins over then-undefeated David Izon and popular gatekeeper Jimmy Thunder and a split decision loss against faded Larry Holmes. Coming into the bout, Harris was on a seven-fight winning streak, which included a wide UD win over Jeremy Williams.

The fight took place at the Convention Hall in Atlantic City, in the undercard of the fight between Oleg Maskaev and Hasim Rahman. The first round started with both fighters standing toe-to-toe and landing hard shots. In the second round, Jefferson dropped Harris twice. A few seconds after the second knockdown, Harris turned the tide, dropping Jefferson with a right hand. The round ended with fighters landing hard shots at each other. For the majority of the third round, Harris appeared to be more active, attacking Jefferson's body. At the end of the round, Jefferson landed an uppercut that knocked Harris' mouthpiece off. After relatively less action-packed fourth and fifth rounds, Jefferson dropped Harris again in the sixth with a series of body shots. Near the end of the round, Jefferson countered a left hand with the left hook of his own, knocking Harris unconscious.

The fight was widely praised for being a slugfest. HBO commentator Larry Merchant called the second round "the best in heavyweight boxing since Bowe vs. Holyfield". The KO was voted by The Ring as "Knockout of the Year". At the conclusion of 1999, Jefferson was ranked No.9 in heavyweight rankings by The Ring.

This win lined up a shot against David Izon. Throughout the fight, Jefferson was soundly outboxing Izon, confidently winning rounds. By the seventh round, HBO commentators suggested the fight to be stopped due to Izon absorbing too much punishment. In the eighth round, however, Jefferson appeared to have punched himself out. With 42 seconds left, Izon dropped Jefferson with a right hook. It appeared as if Jefferson have fallen down mostly due to exhaustion rather than Izon's punch. Izon continued throwing unanswered shots on tired Jefferson, prompting the referee to stop the fight. At the time of the stoppade, Jefferson was unanimously winning on scorecards (78–72, 78–73 and 78–74).

Four months later, Jefferson was scheduled to fight highly ranked contender Oleg Maskaev. In the first round, Maskaev dropped Jefferson with the right hand. During the fall, Jefferson broke his ankle and was limping for the rest of the fight, struggling to put weight on his left leg. Jefferson was dropped again in the second. He managed to hurt Maskaev with an overhand right in the third, but was unable to capitalize on it as he could not put weight behind most of his shots. Maskaev continued his assault on injured Jefferson, prompting the referee to stop the fight in the fourth round.

After a quick knockout of an unknown journeyman Marcus Johnson, Jefferson, with 4–2 record in the last six fights, was given a shot at the WBO world heavyweight title against Wladimir Klitschko. For the bout, Jefferson weighed in at 260.25 lbs, the heaviest in his professional career and 20 pounds heavier than in his previous bout. The additional weight appeared to be muscle. The fight lasted only two rounds. In the first round, Klitschko knocked Jefferson down with a short left hook. After the first round Jefferson's left eye was swollen. Jefferson was knocked down twice more in round two, once with a straight right hand and again with another left hook, with the fight being stopped after the last knockdown, declaring Klitschko the winner by TKO in the second round. Jefferson earned $400,000 for the fight.

After defeating former WBC world heavyweight title challenger Phil Jackson (43–10 with 38 KOs coming into the bout) and Sedreck Fields, Jefferson was allowed to participate in Thunderbox Heavyweight Tournament on November 30, 2002, promoted by Cedric Kushner. The tournament consisted of eight participants, which included two-time world heavyweight champion Tim Witherspoon, former and future world heavyweight title challengers Tony Thompson, Ray Austin and Jeremy Williams, experienced journeyman Maurice Harris, who had entered the tournament after knocking out future world champion Siarhei Liakhovich, and undefeated, hard-hitting Gerald Nobles. Each boxer, including Jefferson, was guaranteed $5,000 and the purse for the tournament winner was $100,000. All bouts took place at Trump Taj Mahal in Atlantic City, New Jersey and were scheduled for three rounds. The bouts were aired in the UK on Eurosport. In the first round, Jefferson defeated Ray Austin by second-round stoppage, but was beaten by Tony Thompson on points in semifinals.

Jefferson was scheduled to face Chris Byrd on April 17, 2004, at Madison Square Garden for the IBF world heavyweight championship, however he was forced to pull out of the fight due to a cut suffered in training. Jefferson made one last world heavyweight title run, facing DaVarryl Williamson in an IBF eliminator. Williamson made quick work of Jefferson, winning by TKO in the 2nd, effectively ending Jefferson's career.

== Professional boxing record ==
28 Wins (21 knockouts, 7 decisions), 4 Losses (4 knockouts, 0 decisions), 1 Draw Archived January 29, 2015, at the Wayback Machine
Result	Record	Opponent	Type	Round	Date	Location	Notes
Loss	21-3	(United States) DaVarryl Williamson	TKO	2	30/04/2005	(New York (state)) New York City, U.S.	WBO NABO/WBC Continental Americas Heavyweight Titles. Referee stopped the bout at 2:41 of the second round.
Win	11-11	(United States) Ed White	TKO	3	27/11/2004	Lafayette, Indiana, U.S.	Referee stopped the bout at 1:14 of the third round.
Win	10-4	(United States) Julius Long	TD	8	27/02/2004	Philadelphia, Pennsylvania, U.S.	Fight went to scorecards due to an accidental headbutt.
Win	18-15-1	(United States) Sedreck Fields	SD	10	21/09/2002	Las Vegas, Nevada, U.S.	
Win	43-10	(United States) Phil Jackson	UD	10	16/02/2002	Las Vegas, Nevada, U.S.	
Win	22-7	(United States) Eric Curry	KO	1	23/11/2001	Southfield, Michigan, U.S.	Curry knocked out at 0:22 of the first round.
Loss	35-1	(Ukraine) Wladimir Klitschko	TKO	2	24/03/2001	Munich, Bayern, Germany	WBO World Heavyweight Title. Referee stopped the bout at 2:09 of the second round.
Win	7-7-1	(United States) Marcus Johnson	TKO	1	04/11/2000	(New York (state)) New York City, U.S.	
Loss	19-2	(Uzbekistan) Oleg Maskaev	TKO	4	20/05/2000	Atlantic City, New Jersey, U.S.	
Loss	24-3	(Nigeria) David Izonritei	TKO	9	15/01/2000	(New York (state)) New York City, U.S.	Referee stopped the bout at 0:11 of the ninth round.
Win	16-9-2	(United States) Maurice Harris	KO	6	06/11/1999	Atlantic City, New Jersey, U.S.	Harris knocked out at 2:52 of the sixth round.
Win	23-8-1	(United States) Melvin Foster	TKO	4	10/09/1999	Mount Pleasant, Michigan, U.S.	Referee stopped the bout at 2:05 of the fourth round.
Win	30-4-1	(United States) Obed Sullivan	SD	12	20/05/1999	Tunica, Mississippi, U.S.	NABA Heavyweight Title.
Win	34-18	(United States) Bert Cooper	TKO	2	04/03/1999	Mount Pleasant, Michigan, U.S.	
Draw	21-8	(United States) Marcellus Brown	TD	2	07/01/1999	Tunica, Mississippi, U.S.	Fight went to scorecards due to an accidental headbutt.
Win	11-27-3	(United States) Marion Wilson	UD	8	02/10/1998	Lake Charles, Louisiana, U.S.	
Win	21-11-1	(United States) Jeff Lally	TKO	2	22/08/1998	Bay Saint Louis, Mississippi, U.S.	Referee stopped the bout at 1:28 of the second round.
Win	21-17-1	(United States) Levi Billups	UD	10	24/05/1998	Auburn Hills, Michigan, U.S.	
Win	6-6-2	(Sudan) Clement Hassan	KO	1	21/04/1998	Lake Charles, Louisiana, U.S.	Hassan knocked out at 2:25 of the first round.
Win	14-12	(Samoa) Tui Toia	TKO	1	27/02/1998	Parma, Ohio, U.S.	
Win	11-7	(United States) Isaac Brown	TKO	1	22/11/1997	Atlantic City, New Jersey, U.S.	
Win	19-30	(United States) Lorenzo Boyd	TKO	1	07/10/1997	Auburn Hills, Michigan, U.S.	
Win	11-42-2	(United States) Brian Yates	UD	6	21/08/1997	Council Bluffs, Iowa, U.S.	
Win	--	(United States) Wendell Blount	KO	1	08/07/1997	Indianapolis, Indiana, U.S.	
Win	11-1	(United States) Ralph West	KO	1	26/04/1997	Atlantic City, New Jersey, U.S.	
Win	3-15	(United States) Harold Johnson	KO	1	18/03/1997	Flint, Michigan, U.S.	
Win	0-10	(United States) Fred Peppers	KO	1	21/12/1996	Kansas City, Missouri, U.S.	Peppers knocked out at 2:56 of the first round.
Win	0-1-1	(United States) Tom Jablonski	KO	2	04/12/1996	Toledo, Ohio, U.S.	
Win	6-19	(United States) Larry Fleming	TKO	1	15/11/1996	Waukegan, Illinois, U.S.	Referee stopped the bout at 1:08 of the first round.
Win	--	(United States) Terrence Holley	KO	1	08/10/1996	Flint, Michigan, U.S.	
Win	0-1	(United States) Robert Toyer	TKO	3	23/10/1995	Inglewood, California, U.S.	
Win	0-1	(United States) Roberto Ramirez	KO	2	25/09/1995	Inglewood, California, U.S.	
Win	0-1	(United States) Ismail Muhammad	KO	1	19/06/1995	Los Angeles, California, U.S.	
