= Jimmy Thunder =

Samoan-born New Zealand boxer (1966–2020)

James Peau
Personal information
- Nickname: Jimmy Thunder
- Nationality: New Zealander
- Born: James Senio Peau; 3 February 1966 Apia, Samoa
- Died: 13 February 2020 (aged 54) Auckland, New Zealand
- Height: 188 cm (6 ft 2 in)
- Weight: Heavyweight

Boxing career
- Reach: 196 cm (77 in)
- Stance: Orthodox

Boxing record
- Total fights: 49
- Wins: 35
- Win by KO: 28
- Losses: 14
Medal record
Men's amateur boxing
Representing New Zealand
Commonwealth Games
Gold medal – first place	1986 Edinburgh	Heavyweight
World Cup
Silver medal – second place	1985 Seoul	Heavyweight

Ti'a James Senio Peau (3 February 1966 – 13 February 2020), known professionally as Jimmy Thunder, was a Samoan-born New Zealand professional boxer who held the IBO heavyweight title from 1994 to 1995. He held multiple regional heavyweight titles, including the OPBF title from 1989 to 1991 and the Australian title twice between 1992 and 1994.

== Early life ==
During his early life and amateur career, Thunder was known as Jimmy Peau. His mother is from the village of Fasitoouta, and his father is from the village of Falelatai. Thunder was born third out of six siblings. While born in Apia, he grew up in Auckland, New Zealand.

He went to school at Onehunga High School in Auckland. His friend introduced Thunder to Gerry Preston. Preston took on the young Samoan into his boxing gym in Mangere Bridge. In his early amateur days, Thunder became the first Samoan-born fighter to win a gold medal in the heavyweight division, representing New Zealand at the 1986 Commonwealth Games in Edinburgh, Scotland. He defeated Dougie Young in his hometown by unanimous decision. It was one of the nine gold medals won for New Zealand in that year. As an amateur he had 89 fights, finishing his amateur career with 83–6 record.

== Career ==
Thunder turned pro in 1988, after being left off New Zealand's Seoul Olympic Games team. He changed his surname from Peau to Thunder in 1989 at the suggestion of his manager at the time, Jack Rennie. Later in his professional career he also fought under the name James Thunder. Among his notable victories are wins over Tony Tubbs, Craig Peterson, Trevor Berbick, and Tim Witherspoon. On the 18 March 1997 edition of the USA Network's Tuesday Night Fights he knocked out Crawford Grimsley with his first punch, scoring the fastest knockout in history at 13 seconds, including the count of 10, which was not even begun, so it lasted 3 seconds, during the quick walk from his corner to the ring centre, immediately throwing the first and only punch with his last step. He finished his 49 fight career with 35 victories, 28 by knockout. Throughout his career he won regional titles including the Australian Heavyweight Champion twice as well as winning the lesser IBO and WBF Heavyweight titles.

== Professional boxing record ==
49 fights	35 wins	14 losses
By knockout	28	7
By decision	7	7

No.	Result	Record	Opponent	Type	Round, time	Date	Location	Notes
49	Loss	35–14	Colin Wilson	UD	10	6 Dec 2002	State Netball and Hockey Centre, Melbourne, Australia	
48	Loss	35–13	Andre Purlette	TKO	2 (10), 1:01	6 Jul 2001	Reno Hilton, Reno, Nevada, U.S.	
47	Loss	35–12	Paea Wolfgramm	TD	7 (10), 3:00	1 Apr 2001	Hard Rock Hotel and Casino, Paradise, Nevada, U.S.	
46	Win	35–11	James Lester	TKO	1 (8), 2:09	9 Mar 2001	Reno Hilton, Reno, Nevada, U.S.	
45	Loss	34–11	Charles Shufford	RTD	8 (10), 3:00	7 Sep 2000	Teamsters Union Hall, Baltimore, Maryland, U.S.	
44	Loss	34–10	Monte Barrett	TKO	7 (10), 0:52	24 Feb 2000	Hammerstein Ballroom, Manhattan, New York, U.S.	
43	Win	34–9	Eli Dixon	TKO	2 (10), 3:00	18 Nov 1999	Spotlight 29 Casino, Coachella, California, U.S.	
42	Win	33–9	Tim Witherspoon	UD	10	7 Apr 1998	Harrah's Cherokee, Cherokee, North Carolina, U.S.	
41	Loss	32–9	Chris Byrd	TKO	9 (10), 1:07	13 Dec 1997	Foxwoods Resort Casino, Mashantucket, Connecticut, U.S.	
40	Loss	32–8	Maurice Harris	KO	7 (10), 2:44	20 May 1997	Medieval Times, Lyndhurst, New Jersey, U.S.	
39	Win	32–7	Crawford Grimsley	KO	1 (10), 0:13	18 Mar 1997	IMA Sports Arena, Flint, Michigan, U.S.	Record knockout on first punch recorded in 1.5 seconds
38	Loss	31–7	John Ruiz	SD	12	14 Jan 1997	Hale Arena, Kansas City, Missouri, U.S.	For vacant NABF heavyweight title
37	Win	31–6	Quinn Navarre	KO	4 (10), 1:38	8 Oct 1996	IMA Sports Arena, Flint, Michigan, U.S.	
36	Win	30–6	William Morris	TKO	10 (10), 0:50	8 Oct 1996	IMA Sports Arena, Flint, Michigan, U.S.	
35	Win	29–6	Will Hinton	KO	7 (10), 1:05	27 Feb 1996	Casino Magic, Bay St. Louis, Mississippi, U.S.	
34	Win	28–6	Melvin Foster	TKO	8 (10), 1:57	3 Oct 1995	Foxwoods Resort Casino, Mashantucket, Connecticut, U.S.	
33	Win	27–6	Ray Anis	TKO	7 (12), 2:56	8 Aug 1995	Spotlight 29 Casino, Coachella, California, U.S.	Retained IBO heavyweight title
32	Loss	26–6	Franco Wanyama	SD	10	16 Jul 1995	Cobo Center, Detroit, Michigan, U.S.	
31	Win	26–5	Bomani Parker	TKO	1 (10), 2:36	17 Jun 1995	MGM Grand Las Vegas, Paradise, Nevada, U.S.	
30	Win	25–5	Daniel Dăncuță	TKO	2 (10), 2:52	9 May 1995	Aladdin Theatre for the Performing Arts, Las Vegas, Nevada, U.S.	
29	Win	24–5	Trevor Berbick	UD	12	15 Mar 1995	Mystic Lake Casino Hotel, Prior Lake, Minnesota, U.S.	Won vacant WBC Continental Americas heavyweight title
28	Win	23–5	Tony Tubbs	MD	12	6 Dec 1994	The Palace of Auburn Hills, Auburn Hills, Michigan, U.S.	Retained IBO heavyweight title
27	Win	22–5	Richard Mason	UD	12	29 Oct 1994	Resorts Casino Hotel, Atlantic City, New Jersey, U.S.	Won vacant IBO heavyweight title
26	Win	21–5	Ed Donaldson	TKO	2 (10), 2:52	27 Sep 1994	Casino Magic, Bay St. Louis, Mississippi, U.S.	
25	Win	20–5	Marion Wilson	UD	10	1 Sep 1994	Convention Center, Albuquerque, New Mexico, U.S.	
24	Win	19–5	Juan Ramón Perez	TKO	2 (10)	3 Aug 1994	Tingley Coliseum, Albuquerque, New Mexico, U.S.	
23	Win	18–5	Don Mackay	TKO	1 (12), 2:35	18 Mar 1994	ABCOS Stadium, Adelaide, Australia	Retained Australian heavyweight title
22	Loss	17–5	Johnny Nelson	UD	12	19 Nov 1993	Mount Smart Stadium, Auckland, New Zealand	Lost WBF (Federation) heavyweight title
21	Win	17–4	Mitieli Navuilawa	KO	1 (10)	9 Oct 1993	National Indoor Stadium, Suva, Fiji	
20	Win	16–4	Melton Bowen	TKO	5 (12)	23 Jul 1993	Sheraton Breakwater Casino Hotel, Townsville, Australia	Won vacant WBF (Federation) heavyweight title
19	Win	15–4	David Ravu Ravu	KO	2 (10)	17 Jun 1993	Central Coast Leagues Club, Sydney, Australia	
18	Loss	14–4	Henry Akinwande	PTS	12	18 Mar 1993	Broadway Theatre, London, United Kingdom	For vacant Commonwealth heavyweight title
17	Win	14–3	Aisea Nama	KO	2 (10)	30 Jun 1992	Apia, Samoa	
16	Win	13–3	Craig Petersen	UD	12	14 Jun 1992	ASB Stadium, Auckland, New Zealand	Won Australian and Australasian heavyweight titles
15	Win	12–3	Young Haumona	PTS	12	6 Dec 1991	Lumpini Stadium, Auckland, New Zealand	Won IBF Pan Pacific heavyweight title
14	Loss	11–3	Craig Petersen	UD	12	4 Nov 1991	Festival Hall, Melbourne, Australia	For vacant Australian heavyweight title
13	Win	11–2	Aisea Nama	KO	7 (10)	24 Aug 1991	Prince Charles Park, Nadi, Fiji	Retained OPBF heavyweight title
12	Loss	10–2	Derek Williams	TKO	2 (12)	1 May 1991	York Hall, London, United Kingdom	For Commonwealth heavyweight title
11	Win	10–1	Rocky Salanoa	KO	1 (10), 2:45	16 Nov 1990	Festival Hall, Melbourne, Australia	
10	Loss	9–1	Mike Hunter	KO	4 (10)	14 Aug 1990	Festival Hall, Melbourne, Australia	
9	Win	9–0	J. B. Williamson	TKO	10 (10), 2:47	14 Jul 1990	Jupiters Hotel & Casino, Gold Coast, Australia	
8	Win	8–0	Mark Lee	KO	1 (10), 1:22	1 May 1990	Melbourne Showgrounds, Melbourne, Australia	
7	Win	7–0	Mauricio Villegas	TKO	4 (12)	24 Feb 1990	Melbourne Showgrounds, Melbourne, Australia	Won vacant WBC International heavyweight title
6	Win	6–0	Bernardo Mercado	TKO	1 (10), 1:27	8 Dec 1989	Melbourne Showgrounds, Melbourne, Australia	
5	Win	5–0	August Tanuvasa	TKO	5 (12), 2:21	20 Oct 1989	Melbourne Showgrounds, Melbourne, Australia	Won vacant OPBF heavyweight title
4	Win	4–0	Andre Van den Oetelaar	TKO	3 (10)	1 Sep 1989	Melbourne Showgrounds, Melbourne, Australia	
3	Win	3–0	Mosese Vilia	KO	1 (10), 1:18	14 Jul 1989	Melbourne Showgrounds, Melbourne, Australia	
2	Win	2–0	Kevin Barry	KO	2 (10)	13 May 1989	Silverdome, Launceston, Australia	
1	Win	1–0	Niko Degei	TKO	4 (6)	8 Apr 1989	National Tennis Centre, Melbourne, Australia	Professional debut

== Personal life ==
After retirement in 2003, it was reported Peau was in financial debt. The Sunday Star-Times discovered he had been living homeless in Sunset Park near Las Vegas. World Boxing Hall of Fame inductee Thell Torrance reported Peau would ask for handouts and turn up to boxing gyms, offering himself for sparring work and was often turned down due to poor conditioning. It was later revealed by close family that he did casual labor at a rehab centre run by Native Americans, and became a personal trainer and part-time bodyguard.

Peau married his second wife, Iris Whitemagpie, a Native American in 2008. The two met in 2006 and were married at Whitemagpie's reservation in Arizona in a cultural ceremony. He had three children in New Zealand, from his first marriage. His eldest son, Louis, was selected for the Samoa national rugby league team to play an Australian selection side in 2010. He also represented the Mt Albert Lions at domestic level, playing at second-row.

Peau was arrested and charged for battery and substantial bodily harm after an altercation at a Las Vegas street party. He was released from the Southern Desert Correctional Center, north of Las Vegas, to US immigration, after his case was considered by an Immigration Court, seeing Peau in threat of being deported to New Zealand. Peau also had previous immigration issues, after being held by US immigration authorities three years prior until Whitemagpie paid a bond for his release after it was discovered he did not hold a US green card.

Peau died in his sleep in Auckland on 13 February 2020, following brain surgery.

Sporting positions
Regional boxing titles
Vacant Title last held by Mark Saris	OPBF heavyweight champion 20 October 1989 – 8 May 1992; Vacated	Vacant Title next held by Justin Fortune
New title	WBC International heavyweight champion 24 February 1990 – 21 January 1992; Vacated	Vacant Title next held by Herbie Hide
New title	IBF Pan Pacific heavyweight champion 6 December 1991 – 3 November 2000; Vacated	Vacant Title next held by Kali Meehan
Preceded by Craig Petersen	Australian heavyweight champion 14 June 1992 – 26 March 1995; Stripped	Vacant Title next held by Vince Cervi
Preceded by Craig Petersen	Australasian heavyweight champion 14 June 1992 – 25 September 1993; Stripped	Vacant Title next held by Craig Petersen
Vacant Title last held by Riddick Bowe	WBC Continental Americas heavyweight champion 17 March 1995 – 21 July 1995; Vacated	Vacant Title next held by Jeremy Williams
World boxing titles
Vacant Title last held by Lawrence Carter	WBF (Federation) heavyweight champion 23 July 1993 – 19 November 1993	Succeeded by Johnny Nelson
Vacant Title last held by Danell Nicholson	IBO heavyweight champion 29 Oct 1994 – 12 January 1996; Vacated	Vacant Title next held by Brian Nielsen
