= Larry Donald =

American boxer (born 1967)

Personal information
- Nickname: The Legend
- Nationality: American
- Born: Larry Ali Donald; January 6, 1967 (age 59)
- Height: 6 ft 3 in (191 cm)
- Weight: Heavyweight

Boxing career
- Reach: 81 in (206 cm)
- Stance: Orthodox

Boxing record
- Total fights: 50
- Wins: 42
- Win by KO: 24
- Losses: 5
- Draws: 3
Medal record
Men's boxing
Representing United States
World Amateur Championships
Bronze medal – third place	1991 Sydney	Super heavyweight

Larry Ali Donald (born January 6, 1967) in Cincinnati, Ohio is an American former professional boxer. As an amateur he won a bronze medal in the super heavyweight division at the 1991 World Championships and won a gold medal at the 1992 World Championship Challenge and becoming amateur world Super heavyweight champion going into the 1992 Olympic Games represented the United States at the 1992 Olympics. During his professional career, he defeated the likes of Evander Holyfield, Jeremy Williams, Bert Cooper, Tim Witherspoon, and Ross Puritty.

== Amateur career ==
Donald was the American representative at Super Heavyweight at the 1992 Barcelona Olympic Games. His results were:

- 1st round bye
- Defeated Nikolay Kulpin (Unified Team/Former Soviet Union) RSC 3 (0:02)
- Lost to Roberto Balado (Cuba) 4–10

In addition to his Olympic run, Donald had a successful amateur career, including:

- National Golden Gloves Super Heavyweight Champion (1989, 1990)
- United States National Amateur Champion at Super Heavyweight (1991)

He also won the World Championship Challenge in Tampa, Florida, March 13–14, 1992, right before going into the 1992 Summer Olympics.

Donald finished his with 72 fights, completing a record of 67 wins, 5 losses.

== Professional career ==
Larry "The Legend" Donald turned pro on January 3, 1993, earning a technical knockout against Craig Brinson. In 1994 he beat fellow undefeated prospect Jeremy Williams, and Bert Cooper, but suffered his first defeat when losing widely to ex-champ Riddick Bowe, who had infamously sucker punched Donald twice at the pre-fight press conference.

He resurfaced in late 1997 outpointing ex-champ Tim Witherspoon, but spent many years fighting low profile on Don King under cards.

In July 2001 he had a high-profile world title eliminator with Kirk Johnson, 31–0–1, but lost a close decision.

In 2002 he traveled to Germany to face Vitali Klitschko. Even at the age of 35, Donald was considered one of the most durable fighters in the world, but the heavy hitting Klitschko surprisingly stopped the veteran, decking him three times in the 10th round.

Although things looked over, Donald seemingly reinvented himself in November 2004 with an upset win over the legendary Evander Holyfield, winning nearly every round against the Hall of Famer ex-champ for the NABC World Champion Title.

In 2005, Donald controversially lost a title eliminator bout to giant-sized Russian Nicolay Valuev which would have earned him the right to fight John Ruiz for the WBA belt.

On July 30, 2007, Donald returned to ring to face Alexander Povetkin, and lost a lopsided decision.

== Professional boxing record ==
50 fights	42 wins	5 losses
By knockout	24	1
By decision	18	4
Draws	3	

No.	Result	Record	Opponent	Type	Round, time	Date	Location	Notes
50	Loss	42–5–3	Alexander Povetkin	UD	10	30 Jun 2007	Olympisky Sport Hall, Moscow	
49	Loss	42–4–3	Nikolay Valuev	MD	12	1 Oct 2005	EWE Arena, Oldenburg	For WBA Inter-Continental Heavyweight title
48	Draw	42–3–3	Ray Austin	MD	12	30 Apr 2005	Madison Square Garden, New York City, New York	For WBA Inter-Continental Heavyweight title
47	Win	42–3–2	Evander Holyfield	UD	12	13 Nov 2004	Madison Square Garden, New York City, New York	Won vacant NABC Heavyweight title
46	Win	41–3–2	Mario Cawley	TKO	3 (10), 1:31	7 Aug 2004	Pontchartrain Center, Kenner, Louisiana	
45	Win	40–3–2	Sedreck Fields	UD	10	15 May 2004	Mandalay Bay Resort and Casino, Las Vegas, Nevada	
44	Loss	39–3–2	Vitali Klitschko	TKO	10 (12), 2:35	23 Nov 2002	Arena Westfalenhalle, Dortmund, Nordrhein-Westfalen	For WBA Inter-Continental Heavyweight title
43	Win	39–2–2	James Stanton	UD	10	1 Jun 2002	Boardwalk Hall, Atlantic City, New Jersey	
42	Loss	38–2–2	Kirk Johnson	UD	10	7 Jul 2001	KeySpan Park, Brooklyn, New York	
41	Draw	38–1–2	Obed Sullivan	MD	12	28 Nov 2000	Orleans Hotel & Casino, Las Vegas, Nevada	Retained WBO NABO Heavyweight title
40	Win	38–1–1	Phil Jackson	KO	5 (10), 2:28	25 May 2000	Grand Casino, Tunica, Mississippi	
39	Win	37–1–1	Mark Bradley	TKO	2 (12),	29 Feb 2000	Plaza Hotel & Casino, Las Vegas, Nevada	Won vacant WBO NABO Heavyweight title
38	Win	36–1–1	Jeff Lally	TKO	2 (10), 1:02	11 Dec 1999	Grand Casino, Tunica, Mississippi	
37	Win	35–1–1	Marion Wilson	TD	5 (10)	12 Jun 1999	Shriner's Auditorium, Wilmington, Massachusetts	
36	Win	34–1–1	Artis Pendergrass	UD	10	6 Mar 1999	UM Sports Pavilion, Minneapolis, Minnesota	
35	Win	33–1–1	Mike Sedillo	UD	10	18 Dec 1998	Memorial Auditorium, Fort Lauderdale, Florida	
34	Win	32–1–1	Ross Puritty	UD	10	21 Apr 1998	Players Island Casino, Lake Charles, Louisiana	
33	Win	31–1–1	Levi Billups	UD	10	5 Feb 1998	Coeur d'Alene Casino, Worley, Idaho	
32	Win	30–1–1	Tim Witherspoon	UD	10	13 Dec 1997	Foxwoods Resort, Mashantucket, Connecticut	Retained WBC Continental Americas Heavyweight title
31	Win	29–1–1	Ricardo Kennedy	TKO	5 (10), 2:32	6 Nov 1997	Grand Casino, Biloxi, Mississippi	
30	Win	28–1–1	Tyrell Biggs	KO	2 (10), 1:00	11 Sep 1997	Foxwoods Resort, Mashantucket, Connecticut	
29	Win	27–1–1	Jeff Lally	KO	3 (10)	30 Aug 1997	El Polideportivo, Mar del Plata, Buenos Aires	
28	Win	26–1–1	Jose Ribalta	TKO	6 (10)	15 Jul 1997	Riverside Convention Center, Rochester, New York	
27	Win	25–1–1	Anthony Willis	TKO	9 (10)	5 Jun 1997	Atlantic City, New Jersey	
26	Win	24–1–1	Ahmed Abdin	UD	12	8 Apr 1997	Grand Casino, Biloxi, Mississippi	Won WBC Continental Americas Heavyweight title
25	Win	23–1–1	Cleveland Woods	PTS	8	24 Jan 1997	Brøndby hallen, Copenhagen	
24	Win	22–1–1	James Gaines	UD	10	17 Dec 1996	National Guard Armory, Pikesville, Maryland	
23	Win	21–1–1	Richard Mason	UD	10	8 Nov 1996	Arizona Charlie's, Las Vegas, Nevada	
22	Win	20–1–1	Derrick Roddy	TKO	2 (10), 2:41	8 Aug 1996	Lake Charles, Louisiana	
21	Win	19–1–1	Jorge Valdes	TKO	6 (12), 2:32	2 Jun 1996	Mystic Lake Casino, Shakopee, Minnesota	Won vacant WBO NABO Heavyweight title
20	Win	18–1–1	Will Hinton	SD	10	3 May 1996	MARK of the Quad Cities, Moline, Illinois	
19	Win	17–1–1	Brian Sargent	TKO	2 (10), 2:32	16 Sep 1995	Mirage Hotel & Casino, Las Vegas, Nevada	
18	Draw	16–1–1	David Dixon	TD	4 (10), 3:00	28 Mar 1995	Casino Magic, Bay St. Louis, Mississippi	Bout stopped due to Donald being cut by an accidental headbutt
17	Loss	16–1	Riddick Bowe	UD	12	3 Dec 1994	Caesars Palace, Las Vegas, Nevada	Lost WBC Continental Americas Heavyweight title
16	Win	16–0	Dan Murphy	UD	10	5 Jul 1994	Washington Convention Center, District of Columbia	
15	Win	15–0	Juan Antonio Diaz	KO	6 (12), 1:27	4 Jun 1994	Reno Hilton, Reno, Nevada	Won WBA Fedelatin Heavyweight title
14	Win	14–0	Bert Cooper	TKO	7 (12), 1:16	14 Apr 1994	Casino Magic, Bay Saint Louis, Mississippi	Retained WBC Continental Americas Heavyweight title
13	Win	13–0	Jeremy Williams	MD	12	12 Mar 1994	MGM Grand, Las Vegas, Nevada	Won WBC Continental Americas Heavyweight title
12	Win	12–0	Michael Dixon	TKO	6 (10), 3:00	13 Feb 1994	Bally's Park Place Hotel Casino, Atlantic City, New Jersey	
11	Win	11–0	Dwayne Hall	TKO	3 (6)	16 Dec 1993	Foxwoods Resort, Mashantucket, Connecticut	
10	Win	10–0	Eugene Adams	TKO	2 (6)	19 Nov 1993	Convention Center, Atlantic City, New Jersey	
9	Win	9–0	Kimmuel Odum	TKO	1 (?)	30 Oct 1993	America West Arena, Phoenix, Arizona	
8	Win	8–0	Mike Gans	KO	3 (8)	27 Aug 1993	Beverly Wilshire Hotel, Beverly Hills, California	
7	Win	7–0	Al Shoffner	KO	5 (6), 1:13	17 Jul 1993	Caesars Palace, Las Vegas, Nevada	
6	Win	6–0	Daniel Dăncuță	MD	6	6 Jun 1993	The Aladdin, Las Vegas, Nevada	
5	Win	5–0	Will Hinton	TKO	4 (6), 2:16	8 May 1993	Caesars Tahoe, Stateline, Nevada	
4	Win	4–0	Matthew Brooks	UD	6	14 Mar 1993	The Aladdin, Las Vegas, Nevada	
3	Win	3–0	Louis Edward Jackson	KO	4 (6), 1:59	6 Feb 1993	Sports Arena, San Diego, California	
2	Win	2–0	Bruce Johnson	TKO	2 (6), 2:27	17 Jan 1993	Union Plaza Casino, Las Vegas, Nevada	
1	Win	1–0	Craig Brinson	TKO	2 (6), 1:47	3 Jan 1993	Hollywood Palladium, Hollywood	

Preceded by Edward Escobedo	United States Amateur Super Heavyweight Champion; 1991	Succeeded by Samson Po'uha
