= Obed Sullivan =

American boxer

Personal information
- Nicknames: The Fighting Marine; Ben
- Nationality: American
- Born: Obed Benjamin Sullivan; January 17, 1968 (age 58)
- Height: 6 ft 3 in (191 cm)
- Weight: Heavyweight

Boxing career
- Reach: 79 in (201 cm)
- Stance: Orthodox

Boxing record
- Total fights: 54
- Wins: 41
- Win by KO: 30
- Losses: 9
- Draws: 2
- No contests: 2

Obed Benjamin Sullivan (born January 17, 1968) is an American former professional boxer. Nicknamed "the Fighting Marine", as he served in the United States Marine Corps, Sullivan was at times a highly ranked heavyweight who fought many significant fighters of his era.

Sullivan turned pro in 1992 and accumulated a 28–1–1 record with an International Boxing Federation intercontinental belt and wins over the likes of Garing Lane, Levi Billups, James Gaines, and Marion Wilson, setting up a bout with fellow rising prospect Hasim Rahman in 1997 on HBO Boxing After Dark. Sullivan held his own and lost a majority decision.

After the loss to Rahman, Sullivan began 1998 by knocking out 33–1 Keith McKnight, but then would be stopped in the ninth round after a tough battle with undefeated contender Michael Grant. He then lost against Jesse Ferguson.

In 1999, he lost a split decision to Derrick Jefferson, and traveled to Germany for a WBO heavyweight title challenge to Vitali Klitschko, where Sullivan quit on his stool after nine rounds. He lost a short match in 2000 against David Tua and later in the year fought Larry Donald to a draw.

His professional career lasted from 1992 to 2007.

== Professional boxing record ==
41 Wins (30 knockouts, 11 decisions), 9 Losses (4 knockouts, 5 decisions), 2 Draws, 2 No Contests
Result	Record	Opponent	Type	Round	Date	Location	Notes
Loss	41–9–2(2)	(United States) James Porter	SD	4	20/01/2007	(United States) Columbus, Ohio, U.S.	
Win	41–8–2(2)	(United States) Chavez Francisco	TKO	5	02/04/2004	(United States) Warren, Michigan, U.S.	
Win	40–8–2(2)	(United States) Ken Murphy	TKO	4	09/01/2004	(United States) Warren, Michigan, U.S.	Referee stopped the bout at 1:52 of the fourth round.
Loss	39–8–2(2)	(United States) Fres Oquendo	TKO	11	02/09/2001	(United States) Choctaw, Mississippi, U.S.	NABF Heavyweight Title. Referee stopped the bout at 0:38 of the 11th round.
Win	39–7–2(2)	(The Bahamas) Sherman Williams	SD	12	20/05/2001	(United States) Elizabeth, Indiana, U.S.	NABF Heavyweight Title.
Win	38–7–2(2)	(Mexico) Agustin Corpus	TKO	5	17/03/2001	(United States) Philadelphia, Mississippi, U.S.	
Win	37–7–2(2)	(Mexico) Jesus Valadez	TKO	4	25/01/2001	(United States) Houston, Texas, U.S.	Referee stopped the bout at 0:30 of the fourth round.
Draw	36–7–2(2)	(United States) Larry Donald	MD	12	28/11/2000	(United States) Paradise, Nevada, U.S.	WBO NABO Heavyweight Title.
Win	36–7–1(2)	(United States) Don Normand	TKO	3	21/09/2000	(United States) Houston, Texas, U.S.	
Loss	35–7–1(2)	(New Zealand) David Tua	KO	1	03/06/2000	(United States) Paradise, Nevada, U.S.	IBF Intercontinental/USBA Heavyweight Title. Sullivan knocked out at 0:51 of the first round.
Win	35–6–1(2)	(United States) Jeff Lally	TKO	3	01/04/2000	(United States) Laughlin, Nevada, U.S.	Referee stopped the bout at 1:54 of the third round.
Loss	34–6–1(2)	(Ukraine) Vitali Klitschko	RTD	9	11/12/1999	Alsterdorf, Hamburg, Germany	WBO Heavyweight Title. Sullivan could not come out for the tenth round.
Win	34–5–1(2)	(United States) Matt Green	KO	3	06/11/1999	(United States) Atlantic City, New Jersey, U.S.	
Win	33–5–1(2)	(United States) Ronnie Smith	TKO	3	21/10/1999	(United States) Houston, Texas, U.S.	Referee stopped the bout at 2:24 of the third round.
Win	32–5–1(2)	(Jamaica) Ricardo Kennedy	TKO	3	16/09/1999	(United States) Biloxi, Mississippi, U.S.	Referee stopped the bout at 1:41 of the third round.
Win	31–5–1(2)	(United States) Everett Martin	TKO	4	13/08/1999	(United States) Bossier City, Louisiana, U.S.	
Loss	30–5–1(2)	(United States) Derrick Jefferson	SD	12	20/05/1999	(United States) Tunica, Mississippi, U.S.	NABA Heavyweight Title.
Win	30–4–1(2)	(Austria) Biko Botowamungu	PTS	10	19/02/1999	Poznań, Poland	
Loss	29–4–1(2)	(United States) Jesse Ferguson	SD	10	08/12/1998	(United States) New York City, U.S.	
Loss	29–3–1(2)	(United States) "Big" Michael Grant	TKO	9	30/05/1998	(United States) Atlantic City, New Jersey, U.S.	IBC World Heavyweight Title. Referee stopped the bout at 2:16 of the ninth round.
Win	29–2–1(2)	(United States) Keith McKnight	KO	7	24/02/1998	(United States) Mashantucket, Connecticut, U.S.	
Loss	28–2–1(2)	(United States) Hasim Rahman	MD	12	01/11/1997	(United States) New York City, U.S.	IBF Intercontinental/USBA Heavyweight Title.
Win	28–1–1(2)	(United States) Carlos Monroe	UD	10	16/09/1997	(United States) Nashville, Tennessee, U.S.	
Win	27–1–1(2)	(United States) Garing Lane	UD	10	14/08/1997	(United States) Worley, Idaho, U.S.	
Win	26–1–1(2)	(United States) Jesse Shelby	TKO	3	12/07/1997	(United States) Tunica, Mississippi, U.S.	
Win	25–1–1(2)	(United States) Isaac Brown	TKO	2	05/06/1997	(United States) Atlantic City, New Jersey, U.S.	
Win	24–1–1(2)	(United States) Levi Billups	TKO	12	08/04/1997	(United States) Biloxi, Mississippi, U.S.	IBF Intercontinental Heavyweight Title.
Win	23–1–1(2)	(United States) Sam Hampton	UD	12	17/12/1996	(United States) Pikesville, Maryland, U.S.	IBF Intercontinental Heavyweight Title.
Win	22–1–1(2)	(United States) Will Hinton	TKO	5	03/10/1996	(United States) Houston, Texas, U.S.	IBF Intercontinental Heavyweight Title. Referee stopped the bout at 3:05 of the fifth round.
Win	21–1–1(2)	(United States) Arthur Weathers	TKO	2	25/09/1996	(United States) Worley, Idaho, U.S.	
Win	20–1–1(2)	(United States) Martin Foster	KO	3	24/08/1996	(United States) Albuquerque, New Mexico, U.S.	Foster knocked out at 1:52 of the third round.
Win	19–1–1(2)	(United States) James Gaines	MD	12	18/07/1996	(United States) Boston, Massachusetts, U.S.	IBF Intercontinental Heavyweight Title.
Win	18–1–1(2)	(United States) Bradley Rone	TKO	4	27/06/1996	(United States) Houston, Texas, U.S.	Referee stopped the bout at 1:14 of the fourth round.
NC	17–1–1(2)	(United States) Buster Mathis, Jr.	NC	5	20/04/1996	(United States) Grand Forks, North Dakota, U.S.	IBF Intercontinental Heavyweight Title. Accidental headbutt caused severe cuts leading to a stoppage.
Win	17–1–1(1)	(United States) Cleveland Woods	KO	2	09/04/1996	(United States) Indio, California, U.S.	
Win	16–1–1(1)	(United States) Olian Alexander	TKO	2	09/03/1996	(United States) Atlantic City, New Jersey, U.S.	IBF Intercontinental Heavyweight Title.
Win	15–1–1(1)	(United States) Terry Davis	TKO	5	13/01/1996	(United States) Atlantic City, New Jersey, U.S.	IBF Intercontinental Heavyweight Title.
Win	14–1–1(1)	(United States) Marion Wilson	MD	10	13/12/1995	(United States) Atlantic City, New Jersey, U.S.	
Win	13–1–1(1)	(United States) Ken Smith	KO	3	05/12/1995	(United States) Biloxi, Mississippi, U.S.	
Win	12–1–1(1)	(United States) Calvin Veasley	TKO	4	06/10/1995	(United States) Atlantic City, New Jersey, U.S.	
Win	11–1–1(1)	(United States) Thomas Williams	TKO	4	09/09/1995	(United States) Fort Worth, Texas, U.S.	IBF Intercontinental Heavyweight Title.
NC	10–1–1(1)	(United States) Martin Foster	NC	8	27/07/1995	(United States) Irvine, California, U.S.	
Win	10–1–1	(United States) Curtis Shepard	KO	1	17/06/1995	(United States) Paradise, Nevada, U.S.	IBF Intercontinental Heavyweight Title. Shepard knocked out at 1:49 of the first round.
Win	9–1–1	(United States) Levi Billups	SD	8	26/01/1995	(United States) Irvine, California, U.S.	
Win	8–1–1	(United States) Jeff Hollins	KO	4	17/12/1994	(United States) Palm Springs, California, U.S.	
Win	7–1–1	"Handy" Randy Wilson	KO	4	06/12/1994	(United States) Scottsdale, Arizona, U.S.	
Win	6–1–1	(United States) Jim Mullen	KO	5	02/11/1994	(United States) Woodland Hills, California, U.S.	
Draw	5–1–1	(Syria) Ahmed Abdin	PTS	6	13/10/1994	(United States) Houston, Texas, U.S.	
Win	5–1	(United States) Jeff Hollins	UD	4	09/09/1994	(United States) Scottsdale, Arizona, U.S.	
Win	4–1	(United States) Jeff Hollins	UD	4	23/08/1994	(United States) Scottsdale, Arizona, U.S.	
Win	3–1	Paul Hirsch	TKO	2	30/07/1994	(United States) Tucson, Arizona, U.S.	
Loss	2–1	(United States) Jonathan Grant	UD	4	Jun 25, 1994	(United States) Paradise, Nevada, U.S.	
Win	2–0	Daniel Moore	UD	4	16/06/1994	(United States) North Las Vegas, Nevada, U.S.	
Win	1–0	Mike Davis	KO	1	27/08/1992	(United States) San Diego, California, U.S.	
