= Phil Jackson (boxer) =

American boxer (born 1964)

Personal information
- Nickname: The Enforcer
- Nationality: American
- Born: Phil Jackson; May 11, 1964 (age 62)
- Height: 6 ft 0 in (1.83 m)
- Weight: Heavyweight

Boxing career
- Reach: 79 in (201 cm)
- Stance: Orthodox

Boxing record
- Total fights: 58
- Wins: 44
- Win by KO: 38
- Losses: 13
- Draws: 0
- No contests: 1

Phil Jackson (born May 11, 1964) is an American former professional boxer, best known for challenging Lennox Lewis for the WBC heavyweight world title in 1994.

== Amateur career ==
Born in Miami Beach, Florida, Jackson was the heavyweight alternate on the 1988 United States Olympic team

== Professional career ==
Known as "The Enforcer", Jackson began his career in 1988 on a tear, winning his first 25 fights mostly by KO, setting up a bout with hard-punching Canadian top contender Razor Ruddock in 1992. Ruddock dominated, and Jackson was knocked down once in the 3rd, and once in the 4th, staying down for the 10 count. He then won his next five fights to set up the fight in 1994 with Lewis.

Lewis received a lot of flak for the fight, given Jackson's loss to Ruddock who had lost to Lewis towards the end of his career. Jackson was Top 10 in the Ring Magazine at the time but boxing insiders remained sceptical. The fight was shown on HBO and was unimpressive, with Lewis plodding after Jackson en route to an 8th-round TKO.

In 1995 his career began to sputter as he slipped to a journeyman. He lost bouts against future contenders Chris Byrd, Brian Nielsen, and Jeremy Williams.In 1998 he beat Alex Stewart, setting up a shot at a fringe belt in 1999 against Monte Barrett. Barrett won easily, and Jackson went on to lose to a "who's who" list of heavyweight contenders, including Fres Oquendo, Wladimir Klitschko, Larry Donald, Derrick Jefferson, and Dominick Guinn. The loss to Guinn in 2004, a fight in which Guinn knocked Jackson out in twenty-three seconds, was Jackson's last bout.

He retired with a record with 44–13 with 38 knockouts.

== Professional boxing record ==
44 Wins (38 knockouts, 6 decisions), 13 Losses (7 knockouts, 6 decisions), 1 No Contest
Result	Record	Opponent	Type	Round	Date	Location	Notes
Loss	24-1	(United States) Dominick Guinn	KO	1	24/07/2004	(United States) Atlantic City, New Jersey, U.S.	Jackson knocked out at 0:23 of the first round.
Win	22-35-2	(United States) Garing Lane	UD	6	24/10/2003	(United States) Miami, Florida, U.S.	
Loss	15-8	(United States) Brian Nix	UD	6	21/04/2002	(United States) Laughlin, Nevada, U.S.	
Loss	24-3-1	(United States) Derrick Jefferson	UD	10	16/02/2002	(United States) Las Vegas, Nevada, U.S.	
Win	7-3	(United States) Nick Nurse	UD	6	25/05/2001	(United States) Miami, Florida, U.S.	
Loss	37-1-1	(United States) Larry Donald	KO	5	25/05/2000	(United States) Tunica, Mississippi, U.S.	Jackson knocked out at 2:28 of the fifth round.
Loss	29-1	(Ukraine) Wladimir Klitschko	KO	2	12/11/1999	(United States) Las Vegas, Nevada, U.S.	Jackson knocked out at 1:59 of the second round.
Loss	14-0	(United States) Fres Oquendo	UD	10	12/09/1999	(United States) Kansas City, Missouri, U.S.	
Loss	19-0	(United States) Monte Barrett	UD	12	03/04/1999	(United States) Las Vegas, Nevada, U.S.	WBC Continental Americas Heavyweight Title.
Win	26-5	(Haiti) Ray Anis	TKO	2	03/12/1998	(United States) Bay Saint Louis, Mississippi, U.S.	Referee stopped the bout at 2:55 of the second round.
Win	42-7	(Jamaica) Alex Stewart	UD	10	24/07/1998	(United States) Miami, Florida, U.S.	
Win	19-2-2	(United States) Gerard Jones	TKO	2	29/05/1998	(United States) Miami, Florida, U.S.	Referee stopped the bout at 2:45 of the second round.
Win	7-7	(United States) Bryant Smith	TKO	5	27/03/1998	(United States) Atlantic City, New Jersey, U.S.	Referee stopped the bout at 2:45 of the fifth round.
Loss	31-1	(United States) Keith McKnight	UD	10	02/10/1997	(United States) Nashville, Tennessee, U.S.	
Loss	28-2	(United States) Jeremy Williams	KO	1	25/02/1997	(United States) Long Beach, California, U.S.	Jackson knocked out at 1:25 of the first round.
Win	19-3	(United States) Sonny Barch	KO	1	02/11/1996	(The Bahamas) Nassau, Bahamas	
Win	15-13-1	(United States) Harry Daniels	TKO	1	24/08/1996	(United States) Valdosta, Georgia, U.S.	
Win	26-17-1	(United States) Eddie Gonzales	KO	4	29/07/1996	(United States) Hallandale, Florida, U.S.	
Win	1-16	(United States) Jack Jackson	TKO	2	15/06/1996	(The Bahamas) Nassau, Bahamas	
Loss	25-0	(Denmark) Brian Nielsen	TKO	6	29/03/1996	Copenhagen, Denmark	IBO Heavyweight Title.
Loss	13-0	(United States) Chris Byrd	UD	12	21/11/1995	(United States) Auburn Hills, Michigan, U.S.	WBU International Heavyweight Title.
Win	8-16	(United States) Larry Davis	TKO	2	08/09/1995	(United States) Miami Beach, Florida, U.S.	
No Contest	0-5	(United States) Alvin Ellis	NC	1	22/08/1995	(United States) Raleigh, North Carolina, U.S.	
Win	5-12-1	(United States) Krishna Wainwright	TKO	3	22/07/1995	(United States) Miami Beach, Florida, U.S.	
Win	11-4-1	(United States) Martin Foster	TKO	8	01/11/1994	(United States) Las Vegas, Nevada, U.S.	
Win	9-7	(United States) Art Card	TKO	4	08/09/1994	(United States) Davie, Florida, U.S.	Referee stopped the bout at 1:35 of the fourth round.
Loss	24-0	(United Kingdom) Lennox Lewis	TKO	8	06/05/1994	(United States) Atlantic City, New Jersey, U.S.	WBC Heavyweight Title. Referee stopped the bout at 1:35 of the eighth round.
Win	26-16-1	(United States) Eddie Gonzales	UD	10	04/12/1993	(United States) Corpus Christi, Texas, U.S.	
Win	13-8	(United States) Mike Dixon	TKO	5	24/08/1993	(United States) Atlantic City, New Jersey, U.S.	
Win	22-5	(United States) Lawrence Carter	TKO	3	22/06/1993	(United States) Atlantic City, New Jersey, U.S.	
Win	0-9	(United States) Terry Miller	KO	1	24/04/1993	(United States) Forest City, North Carolina, U.S.	
Win	13-24-2	(United States) Danny Wofford	TKO	4	30/03/1993	(United States) Kansas City, Missouri, U.S.	
Loss	26-3-1	(Canada) Donovan Ruddock	KO	4	26/06/1992	(United States) Cleveland, Ohio, U.S.	IBC Heavyweight Title. Jackson knocked out at 2:12 of the fourth round.
Win	7-2	(United States) Everett Mayo	TKO	3	25/04/1992	(United States) Miami Beach, Florida, U.S.	
Win	13-43-2	(United States) Frankie Hines	KO	1	28/03/1992	(United States) Forest City, North Carolina, U.S.	
Win	14-21-1	(United States) Melvin Epps	TKO	5	13/12/1991	(United States) Tampa, Florida, U.S.	
Win	10-9	(United States) Carl Williams	TKO	5	14/09/1991	(United States) Las Vegas, Nevada, U.S.	
Win	20-2	(United States) Tony Willis	TKO	5	11/06/1991	(United States) Miami Beach, Florida, U.S.	Referee stopped the bout at 2:57 of the fifth round.
Win	5-14	(United States) Lynwood Jones	KO	1	23/05/1991	(United States) Fort Lauderdale, Florida, U.S.	
Win	22-7	(United States) Jeff Sims	TKO	4	07/04/1991	(United States) Ocala, Florida, U.S.	
Win	8-7-1	(United States) William Morris	TKO	8	19/02/1991	(United States) Kansas City, Missouri, U.S.	
Win	20-3	(United States) Olian Alexander	KO	1	14/12/1990	(United States) Kansas City, Missouri, U.S.	IBC Heavyweight Title.
Win	12-4	(United States) Bobby Collins	KO	8	28/08/1990	(United States) Tampa, Florida, U.S.	Collins knocked out at 2:04 of the eighth round.
Win	15-5	(United States) Alvino Manson	TKO	2	26/06/1990	(United States) Tampa, Florida, U.S.	Referee stopped the bout at 2:07 of the second round.
Win	2-3	(United States) William Knorr	KO	1	01/06/1990	(United States) Fort Lauderdale, Florida, U.S.	Knorr knocked out at 1:40 of the first round.
Win	6-1	(United States) David Nall	TKO	2	18/04/1990	(United States) Tampa, Florida, U.S.	
Win	2-11	(United States) Ricardo Spain	KO	3	10/04/1990	(United States) Miami, Florida, U.S.	Spain knocked out at 2:20 of the third round.
Win	0-11	(Nicaragua) Lino Cajina	TKO	2	23/03/1990	(United States) Homestead, Florida, U.S.	
Win	0-4	(United States) Gerald Brown	KO	1	19/03/1990	(United States) Miami Beach, Florida, U.S.	
Win	19-7-1	(United States) Jesse Shelby	TKO	5	16/02/1990	(United States) Miami, Florida, U.S.	Referee stopped the bout at 0:43 of the fifth round.
Win	8-6-1	(United States) Danny Wofford	TKO	5	24/01/1990	(United States) Hallandale, Florida, U.S.	
Win	1-3	(United States) David Robinson	TKO	1	26/10/1989	(United States) Kansas City, Missouri, U.S.	
Win	--	(United States) John Ford	TKO	1	08/09/1989	(United States) Hialeah, Florida, U.S.	
Win	3-14-1	(United States) Joe Adams	TKO	4	03/07/1989	(United States) Kansas City, Kansas, U.S.	
Win	6-3	(United States) Eddie Blackwell	KO	2	22/04/1989	(United States) Kansas City, Kansas, U.S.	
Win	--	(United States) Lionel Butler	PTS	4	24/02/1989	(United States) Biloxi, Mississippi, U.S.	
Win	1-0	(United States) Russell Watson	TKO	6	04/02/1989	(United States) Miami Beach, Florida, U.S.	
Win	3-3	(United States) Wendell Everett	UD	4	09/12/1988	(United States) Atlantic City, New Jersey, U.S.	
