= Michael Grant (boxer) =

American boxer (born 1972)

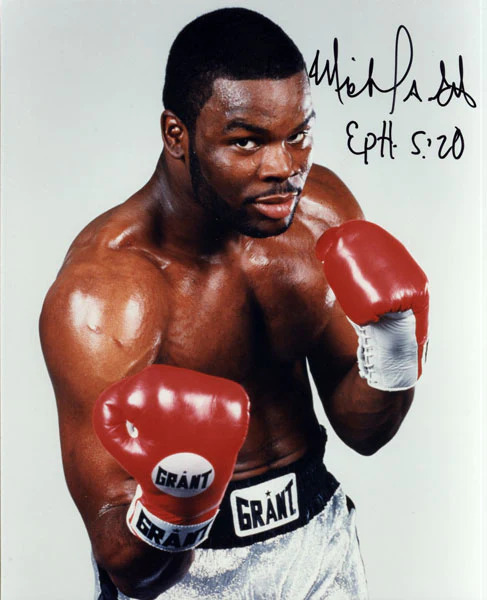

Personal information
- Nickname: Big
- Nationality: American
- Born: Michael Anthony Grant; August 4, 1972 (age 54) Chicago, Illinois, U.S.
- Height: 6 ft 7 in (2.01 m)
- Weight: Heavyweight

Boxing career
- Reach: 86 in (218 cm)
- Stance: Orthodox

Boxing record
- Total fights: 55
- Wins: 48
- Win by KO: 36
- Losses: 7

Michael Anthony Grant (born August 4, 1972) is an American former professional boxer who competed from 1994 to 2017. He challenged once for the unified WBC, IBF, and IBO heavyweight titles in 2000. At regional level, he held the NABF heavyweight title in 1999.

== Early life ==
Before his boxing career, he blossomed into a three-sport star at Chicago's Harper High School. He was a right handed pitcher who drew attention from the Kansas City Royals, an imposing two-way player at tight end and defensive end on the football field and a front court force on the basketball court. Grant graduated in 1991 and went on to play American Football at Mount San Antonio College near Los Angeles, and Fullerton College in Orange County, California.

== Amateur career ==
Grant had just 12 amateur fights. In the Golden Gloves 1994 semi-finals he suffered his only amateur loss to Derrick Jefferson on points.

== Professional career ==
=== Early career ===
In his early career, Grant beat Corey Sanders, Ross Puritty, Lionel Butler, Al Cole, Jorge Luis Gonzalez, David Izon and Obed Sullivan. The 1997 Al Cole win earned him the fringe IBC title. Grant made defenses against Jorge Luis Gonzalez, David Izon and Obed Sullivan. In 1999 Michael beat Ahmed Abdin to earn the NABF title, then defeated Lou Savarese. His last fight before the title shot was against Andrew Golota in a WBC eliminator, touching the canvas twice but winning by stoppage in the tenth round after a knockdown when Golota refused to continue.

=== World title challenge ===
Grant's undefeated record and victories against Sullivan, Savarese and Golota earned him an opportunity to challenge newly crowned undisputed heavyweight champion Lennox Lewis. Lewis was coming off a unanimous decision victory against Evander Holyfield and wanted to make a statement with his first title-defence.

Grant started the fight very aggressively but Lewis put him down with a right hand. He got back to his feet and was beaten badly by Lewis, a left hand on the side of the head sending Grant reeling into the corner and counting as a second knockdown. Grant was badly hurt but seemed to recover toward the end of the first round until a vicious right hand sent him down for the third time. Remarkably Grant beat the count. His trainer Don Turner implored him to use his legs. While Grant tried to rally, Lewis took his time in round two before finishing Grant off with an uppercut.

=== Later career ===
Sidelined by injuries for fifteen months, in his comeback fight Grant fought and lost to Jameel McCline in 2001. McCline knocked him down in the first round, and Grant had to retire due to a broken ankle. After a brief comeback, then-undefeated Dominick Guinn knocked him out in 2003 in seven rounds. Since the loss, Grant has fought sporadically against limited opposition while having several high-profile trainers, including Don Turner, Teddy Atlas, Buddy McGirt and most recently Eddie Mustafa Muhammad.

On May 7, 2010, Grant fought for the first time in eighteen months and won by first-round technical knockout over Kevin Burnett at Oheka Castle, Huntingdon, NY.

On August 21, 2010, with a 20 kg weight advantage, Grant was physically dominant, but lost on points to Tomasz Adamek by a unanimous decision.

On March 11, 2011, Grant fought Tye Fields at the Planet Hollywood Resort and Casino in Las Vegas. Grant scored a one-punch third-round knockout.

On November 19, 2011, Grant faced Francois Botha for the vacant World Boxing Federation (WBF) Heavyweight title. Grant won by a 12th-round KO, having needed a KO due to being well behind on all three cards. The fight took place in Johannesburg, South Africa, the first time he had fought outside the USA. Immediately after the fight, Grant called out the Klitschko brothers who held all of the major heavyweight titles. After an 18-month layoff, Grant defended the WBF belt against France-based Cameroonian Carlos Takam on May 24, 2013, in Noisy-le-Grand, France, losing by 8th-round technical knockout.

It was announced in July 2017 that Grant would face Dillian Whyte at the Pinnacle Bank Arena in Lincoln, Nebraska on August 19, however the fight was scrapped after a backlash from fans, and Whyte would face Malcolm Tann instead.

== Professional boxing record ==
55 fights	48 wins	7 losses
By knockout	36	6
By decision	10	1
By disqualification	2	0

No.	Result	Record	Opponent	Type	Round, time	Date	Location	Notes
55	Loss	48–7	Krzysztof Zimnoch	KO	2 (8), 1:22	Apr 22, 2017	Legionowo Arena, Legionowo	
54	Loss	48–6	Mahmoud Charr	RTD	5 (10), 3:00	Oct 24, 2014	Olympic Indoor Arena, Moscow, Central Federal District	
53	Loss	48–5	Carlos Takam	TKO	8 (12), 0:50	May 24, 2013	Gymnase du Clos de l'Arche, Noisy-le-Grand, Île-de-France	Lost WBF heavyweight title
52	Win	48–4	Francois Botha	KO	12 (12), 2:23	Nov 19, 2011	Monte Casino, Johannesburg, Gauteng	Won vacant WBF heavyweight title
51	Win	47–4	Tye Fields	KO	3 (10), 1:06	Mar 11, 2011	Planet Hollywood Resort & Casino, Las Vegas, Nevada	
50	Loss	46–4	Tomasz Adamek	UD	12	Aug 21, 2010	Prudential Center, Newark, New Jersey	For IBF International & NABO heavyweight titles
49	Win	46–3	Kevin Burnett	TKO	1 (8), 1:48	May 7, 2010	Oheka Castle, Huntington, New York	
48	Win	45–3	Paul Marinaccio	UD	12	Nov 15, 2008	Seneca Niagara Casino & Hotel, Niagara Falls, New York	Won vacant NABA USA heavyweight title
47	Win	44–3	Demetrice King	UD	8	Jul 11, 2008	National Guard Armory, Philadelphia, Pennsylvania	
46	Win	43–3	Kevin Montiy	TKO	7 (8), 1:59	Sep 5, 2007	Cipriani Wall Street, New York, New York	
45	Win	42–3	Billy Zumbrun	TKO	5 (8), 2:17	Jun 27, 2007	Cipriani Wall Street, New York, New York	
44	Win	41–3	Marcus McGee	UD	8	Jun 24, 2005	Target Center, Minneapolis, Minnesota	
43	Win	40–3	Wallace McDaniel	TKO	8, (8) 2:18	Apr 8, 2005	Miccosukee Indian Gaming Resort, Miami, Florida	
42	Win	39–3	Charles Hatcher	TKO	8 (8), 2:04	Feb 21, 2004	City Center Pavilion, Reno, Nevada	
41	Loss	38–3	Dominick Guinn	TKO	7 (10), 1:21	Jun 7, 2003	Boardwalk Hall, Atlantic City, New Jersey	
40	Win	38–2	Gilbert Martinez	TKO	8 (10), 2:23	Apr 18, 2003	Palace Indian Gaming Center, Lemoore, California	
39	Win	37–2	Carlton Johnson	TKO	5 (10)	Jan 24, 2003	Spectrum, Philadelphia, Pennsylvania	
38	Win	36–2	James Walton	TKO	4 (10)	Nov 7, 2002	Hilton Hotel, Washington	
37	Win	35–2	Robert Davis	TKO	3 (10), 2:10	Aug 3, 2002	Foxwoods Resort, Mashantucket, Connecticut	
36	Win	34–2	Anthony Willis	TKO	2 (10), 2:55	Jun 1, 2002	Stratosphere Hotel & Casino, Las Vegas, Nevada	
35	Win	33–2	Joe Lenhart	TKO	5 (8), 2:58	Apr 13, 2002	Mountaineer Casino, Racetrack and Resort, Chester, West Virginia	
34	Win	32–2	Reynaldo Minus	TKO	4 (8), 2:02	Mar 9, 2002	A. J. Palumbo Center, Pittsburgh, Pennsylvania	
33	Loss	31–2	Jameel McCline	TKO	1 (10), 0:43	Jul 21, 2001	Caesars Palace, Las Vegas, Nevada	
32	Loss	31–1	Lennox Lewis	KO	2 (12), 2:53	Apr 29, 2000	Madison Square Garden, New York, New York	For WBC, IBF, and IBO heavyweight titles
31	Win	31–0	Andrew Golota	TKO	10 (12), 1:31	Nov 20, 1999	Trump Taj Mahal, Atlantic City, New Jersey	Retained NABF heavyweight title
30	Win	30–0	Lou Savarese	UD	10	Jun 19, 1999	Madison Square Garden, New York, New York	
29	Win	29–0	Ahmed Abdin	RTD	10 (12), 3:00	Jan 30, 1999	Boardwalk Hall, Atlantic City, New Jersey	Won vacant NABF heavyweight title
28	Win	28–0	Obed Sullivan	TKO	9 (12), 2:16	May 30, 1998	Convention Center, Atlantic City, New Jersey	Retained IBC heavyweight title
27	Win	27–0	David Izon	TKO	5 (12), 1:07	Jan 17, 1998	Convention Center, Atlantic City, New Jersey	Retained IBC heavyweight title
26	Win	26–0	Jorge Luis Gonzalez	TKO	1 (12), 2:00	Nov 7, 1997	Bally's Las Vegas, Las Vegas, Nevada	Retained IBC heavyweight title
25	Win	25–0	Alfred Cole	RTD	10 (12), 3:00	Jun 20, 1997	Bally's Park Place Hotel Casino, Atlantic City, New Jersey	Won vacant IBC heavyweight title
24	Win	24–0	Lionel Butler	DQ	4 (10), 0:38	Apr 19, 1997	Las Vegas Hilton, Las Vegas, Nevada	
23	Win	23–0	Jeff Wooden	SD	10	Mar 14, 1997	Pepsi Arena, Albany, New York	
22	Win	22–0	Ray Anis	UD	10	Dec 6, 1996	Claridge Hotel & Casino, Atlantic City, New Jersey	
21	Win	21–0	Louis Monaco	TKO	3 (?)	Oct 6, 1996	Sports Arena, Los Angeles, California	
20	Win	20–0	Ross Puritty	UD	10	Jul 21, 1996	Teamster's Hall, Baltimore, Maryland	
19	Win	19–0	Ed Donaldson	TKO	3 (10), 2:15	Jun 11, 1996	Foxwoods Resort, Mashantucket, Connecticut	
18	Win	18–0	Olian Alexander	TKO	4 (4)	May 10, 1996	Madison Square Garden, New York, New York	
17	Win	17–0	Corey Sanders	TKO	2 (8), 0:22	Mar 15, 1996	Convention Center, Atlantic City, New Jersey	
16	Win	16–0	Rick Sullivan	TKO	1 (6)	Jan 30, 1996	Medieval Times, Lyndhurst, New Jersey	
15	Win	15–0	Bradley Rone	UD	6	Mar 12, 1996	Madison Square Garden, New York, New York	
14	Win	14–0	Mike Dixon	TKO	6 (?), 1:02	Dec 7, 1995	Philadelphia, Pennsylvania	
13	Win	13–0	Tim Noble	TKO	2 (6)	Nov 10, 1995	Bally's Park Place Hotel Casino, Atlantic City, New Jersey	
12	Win	12–0	Stanley Wright	TKO	2 (10)	Sep 22, 1995	Lewiston, Maine	
11	Win	11–0	Lou Turchiarelli	TKO	1 (8), 2:30	May 20, 1995	Convention Center, Atlantic City, New Jersey	
10	Win	10–0	Tyrone Dixon	TKO	1 (?)	Dec 6, 1994	Memphis, Tennessee	
9	Win	9–0	Danny Wofford	PTS	8	Dec 3, 1994	Grundy, Virginia	
8	Win	8–0	Steve Edwards	DQ	5 (6), 0:33	Nov 5, 1994	Aladdin Hotel & Casino, Las Vegas, Nevada	
7	Win	7–0	John Basil Jackson	UD	4	Nov 1, 1994	Omni New Daisy Theater, Memphis, Tennessee	
6	Win	6–0	Carlton Brown	KO	1 (?)	Oct 22, 1994	Grundy, Virginia	
5	Win	5–0	Ed Strickland	KO	1 (?)	Oct 4, 1994	Memphis, Tennessee	
4	Win	4–0	Elvin Evans	TKO	6 (?)	Sep 23, 1994	Grand Casino, Tunica, Mississippi	
3	Win	3–0	Frankie Hines	KO	1 (?)	Sep 6, 1994	Memphis, Tennessee	
2	Win	2–0	Jerome Jones	TKO	2 (?)	Aug 7, 1994	Grand Casino, Tunica, Mississippi	
1	Win	1–0	Ernest English	TKO	1 (4)	Jul 21, 1994	Hasbrouck Heights, New Jersey	

Titles in pretence
Vacant Title last held by Jerry Ballard	World Heavyweight Champion; IBC recognition June 20, 1997 – January 30, 1999; Vacated	Vacant Title next held by Brian Nielsen
Vacant Title last held by Evander Holyfield	World Heavyweight Champion; WBF recognition 19 November 2011 – 24 May 2013	Succeeded by Carlos Takam
