= Gerry Preston =

New Zealand boxer

Gerald William Preston was a noted New Zealand boxing trainer and former boxer. Preston trained many of New Zealand's most successful boxers, including heavyweight champions David Tua and Jimmy Thunder, and New Zealand professional middleweight champion of the 1970s Billy Opetaia.
