= Biko Botowamungu =

Austrian boxer (1957–2025)

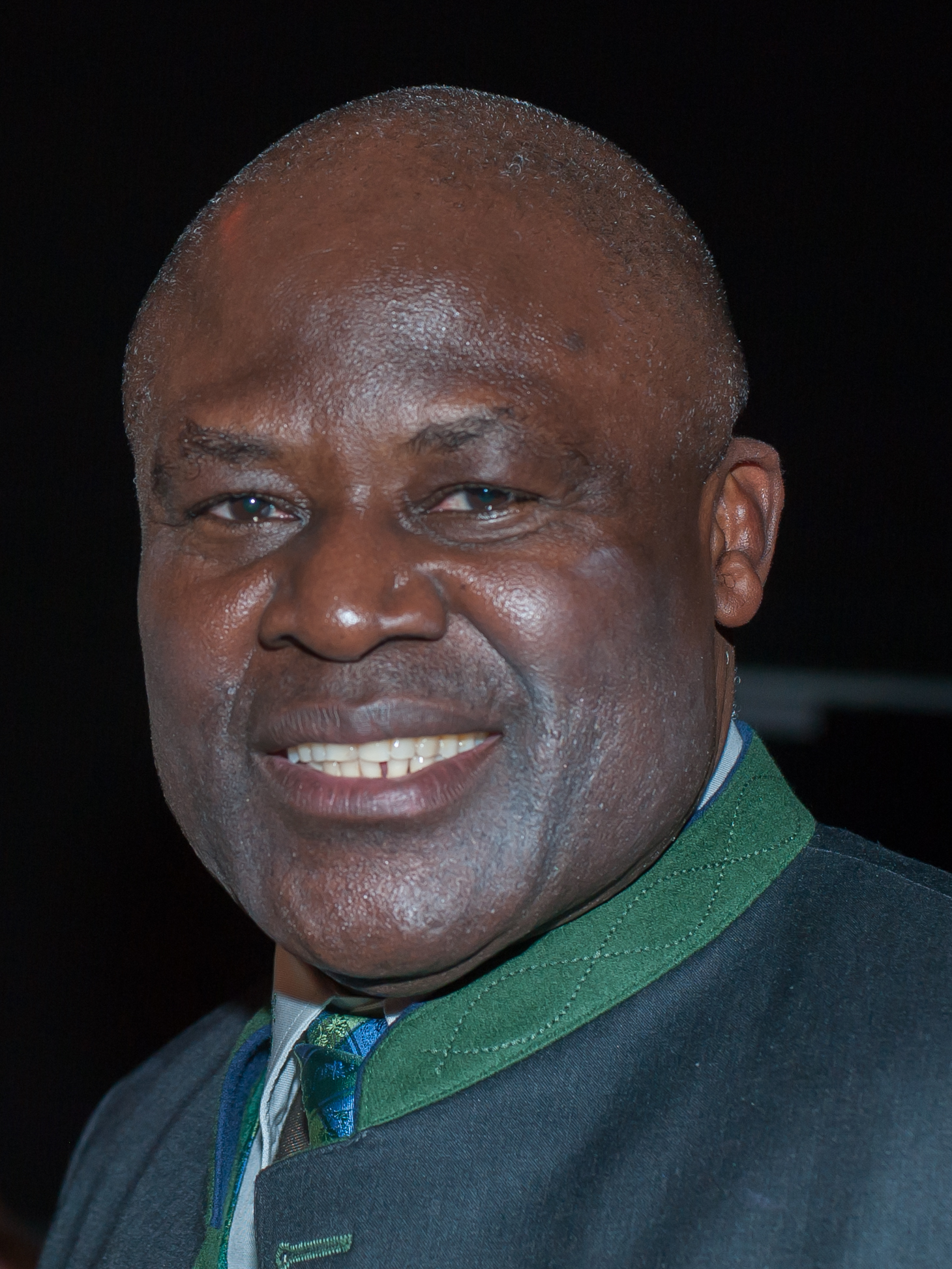
- Botowamungu in 2014

Personal information
- Nationality: Austrian
- Born: Ikomoniya Botowamungu; 22 January 1957 Stanleyville, Belgian Congo
- Died: 24 August 2025 (aged 68) Vienna, Austria
- Height: 6 ft 3 in (1.91 m)
- Weight: Heavyweight

Boxing career
- Reach: 76 in (190 cm)

Boxing record
- Total fights: 27
- Wins: 10
- Win by KO: 10
- Losses: 16
- Draws: 1

Ikomoniya "Biko" Botowamungu (22 January 1957 – 24 August 2025) was an Austrian boxer. Born in Stanleyville, Belgian Congo, he competed at the 1988 Summer Olympics in Seoul, South Korea in the super-heavyweight (+ 91 kg) division where he was defeated by Riddick Bowe of the United States in his opening bout. Botowamungu was Austrian amateur champion in heavyweight (1983) and super-heavyweight (1984–1989 and 1992).

== Career ==
Botowamungu had a professional boxing record of 10 wins, 16 losses and a draw.

In his homeland, Botowamungu was a wrestler. He was to compete in the 1976 Summer Olympics in that sport, representing Zaire but the African nation did not compete in Montreal, citing economic reasons.

After coming to Austria, for a time he became a professional wrestler known as "Dr. Biko". In 1981 he appeared in Japan's New Japan Pro Wrestling promotion as "Zaire Biko".

== Later life and death ==
Later, Botowamungu became a Baptist minister. He also appeared on Dancing Stars.

Botowamungu died on 24 August 2025, at the age of 68.

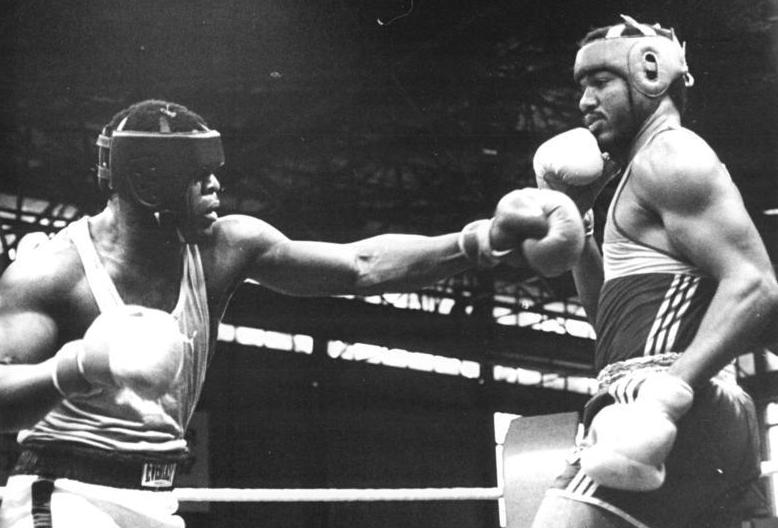
Cuban Jorge Luis González (right) versus Biko Botowamungu in Halle, 1987

== Professional boxing record ==
27 fights	10 wins	16 losses
By knockout	10	5
By decision	0	8
By disqualification	0	3
Draws	1	

No.	Result	Record	Opponent	Type	Round, time	Date	Location	Notes
27	Loss	10–16–1	(Italy) Grezi Line	UD	10	2004-06-22	Sportzentrum, Telfs, Austria	For vacant Austrian heavyweight title.
26	Loss	10–15–1	(Poland) Przemysław Saleta	UD	8	2001-02-03	Warsaw, Poland	
25	Loss	10–14–1	(Lithuania) Rimantas Prismantas	PTS	4	1999-10-22	Legia na Bemowie Hall, Warsaw, Poland	
24	Loss	10–13–1	(Germany) Luan Krasniqi	DQ	5 (6)	1999-08-21	Dresden, Germany	
23	Loss	10–12–1	(Poland) Albert Sosnowski	UD	4	1999-06-26	Hala Ludowa, Wrocław, Poland	
22	Loss	10–11–1	(United Kingdom) Mathew Ellis	PTS	8	1999-05-15	Winter Gardens, Blackpool, England	
21	Loss	10–10–1	(United States) Obed Sullivan	PTS	10	1999-02-19	Poznań, Poland	
20	Loss	10–9–1	(United Kingdom) Pelé Reid	RTD	3 (8), 3:00	1998-09-19	Arena Oberhausen, Oberhausen, Germany	Botowamungu knocked Reid down in round 3, but had to retire in between rounds due to an injury.
19	Loss	10–8–1	(United States) Lamon Brewster	TKO	5 (8), 0:20	1998-01-09	Grand Casino, Biloxi, Mississippi, USA	
18	Loss	10–7–1	(Germany) Timo Hoffmann	PTS	6	1997-12-13	Düsseldorf, Germany	
17	Win	10–6–1	(Hungary) Ferenc Deak	TKO	6 (6)	1997-11-08	Ballsporthalle, Frankfurt, Germany	
16	Loss	9–6–1	(Ukraine) Wladimir Klitschko	DQ	5 (6), 0:02	1997-08-23	Maritim Hotel, Stuttgart, Germany	Botowamungu disqualified after his cornermen refused to leave the ring at the start of round 5.
15	Loss	9–5–1	(United States) Corey Sanders	TKO	2 (8), 3:00	1997-05-14	Michael's Eighth Avenue, Glen Burnie, Maryland, USA	
14	Loss	9–4–1	(Germany) Willi Fischer	DQ	7 (8)	1996-12-07	Vienna, Austria	
13	Loss	9–3–1	(United States) Chris Byrd	UD	10	1996-05-17	Glen Stock Arena, Monroe, Michigan, USA	
12	Win	9–2–1	(United States) Jerome Bryant	TKO	3 (4)	1996-03-02	Civic Center, Sanford, North Carolina, USA	
11	Win	8–2–1	(United States) Frankie Hines	TKO	3 (?)	1995-11-11	Fayetteville, North Carolina, USA	
10	Win	7–2–1	(United States) Robert Mitchell	TKO	2 (4)	1995-09-23	Yanceyville, North Carolina, USA	
9	Loss	6–2–1	(United States) Terrence Lewis	TKO	5 (6)	1995-06-23	National Guard Armory, Philadelphia, Pennsylvania, USA	
8	Win	6–1–1	(United States) Vincent Martin	TKO	1 (4)	1995-06-10	Hyatt Regency Hotel, Knoxville, Tennessee, USA	
7	Win	5–1–1	(United States) Robin Roberts	TKO	1 (4)	1995-04-26	Raleigh, North Carolina, USA	
6	Loss	4–1–1	(United States) Kasson Saxton	TKO	5 (6)	1994-06-11	Ballys Park Place Hotel Casino, Atlantic City, New Jersey, USA	
5	Win	4–0–1	(Serbia) Zvonko Zivkovic	KO	3 (6)	1993-06-19	Vienna, Austria	
4	Win	3–0–1	(United Kingdom) Steve Yorath	TKO	5 (6)	1993-04-03	Vienna, Austria	
3	Draw	2–0–1	(Hungary) Jozsef Kull Koszegi	PTS	6	1993-03-11	Szekszárd, Hungary	
2	Win	2–0	(Hungary) Gyorgy Szabadi	KO	3 (4)	1992-12-11	Klosterneuburg, Austria	
1	Win	1–0	(Slovakia) Frantisek Sumina	TKO	4 (4)	1992-10-03	Vienna, Austria	Professional debut.
