= Craig Brinson =

American boxer

Craig Brinson (born August 24, 1965) is a former professional heavyweight boxer.

Brinson is best known for losing to Larry Donald on 1993-01-03 at the Hollywood Palladium. Donald scored two knockdowns in round two, both by left, right combinations to the head for the TKO at 1:47. ESPN reported that he outscored his opponent 21 to 3 in round two.

He retired with a record of 4 wins, 18 losses, and 2 draws.
