= Chen Bai-sun =

Taiwanese boxer

Personal information
- Full name: 陳 培森, Pinyin: Chén Péi-sēn
- Nationality: Taiwanese
- Born: 2 May 1932 (age 92)

Sport
- Sport: Boxing

Chen Bai-sun (born 2 May 1932) is a Taiwanese boxer. He competed in the men's light middleweight event at the 1964 Summer Olympics. At the 1964 Summer Olympics, he lost to Tom Bogs of Denmark.
