= Tom Bogs =

Danish boxer (1944–2023)

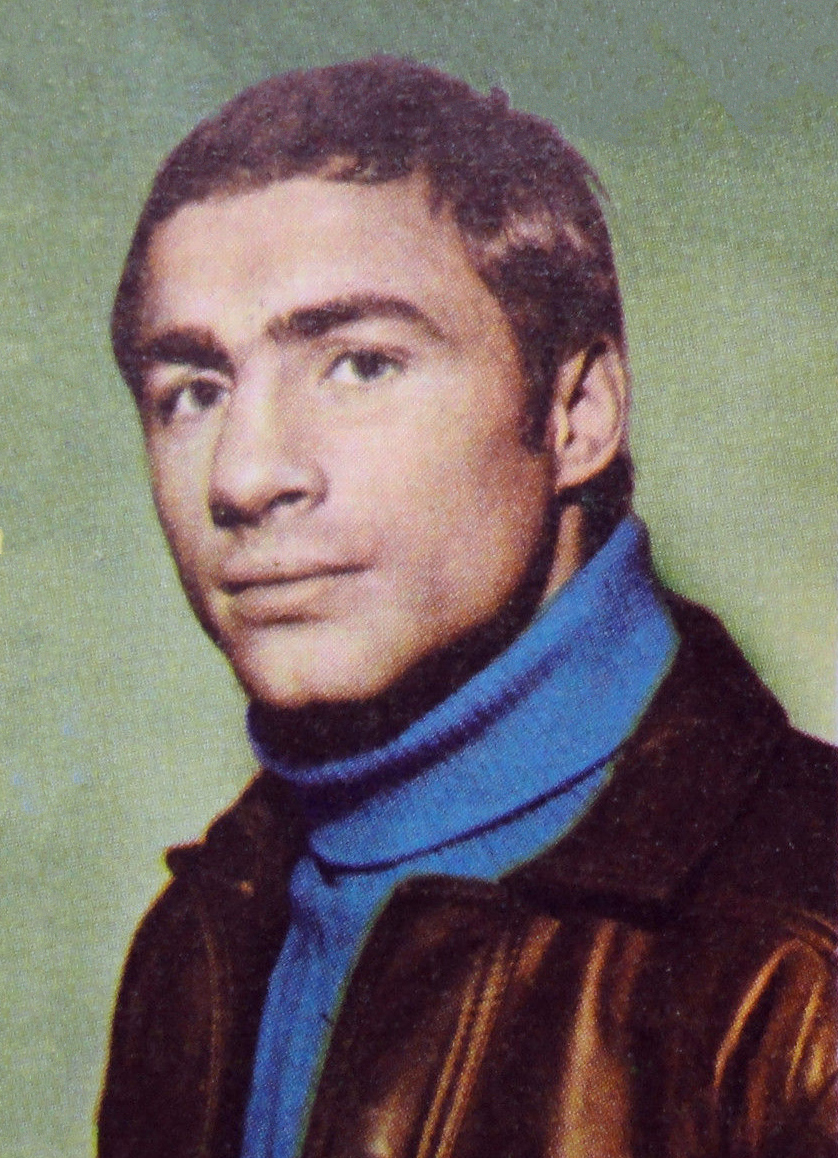
- Tom Bogs c. 1970

Personal information
- Nationality: Danish
- Born: 21 November 1944 Copenhagen, German-occupied Denmark
- Died: 22 December 2023 (aged 79) Copenhagen, Denmark
- Height: 1.76 m (5 ft 9 in)
- Weight: Middleweight; Light heavyweight

Boxing career
- Stance: Orthodox

Boxing record
- Total fights: 86
- Wins: 77
- Win by KO: 25
- Losses: 8
- Draws: 1

Tom Bogs (21 November 1944 – 22 December 2023) was a Danish boxer who competed in the middleweight division.

== Life and career ==
Tom Bogs was born on 21 November 1944 in Copenhagen. His father, Poul Bogs, was the 1947–1950 Danish champion in shot put, and his younger sister Maibritt Bogs held the national title in the discus throw. He competed at the 1964 Summer Olympics in the light-middleweight division. He reached the quarter-finals, where he lost to Nojim Maiyegun of Nigeria. Bogs turned professional shortly after the games and was active during the 1960s and 1970s, building up an unbeaten record of 53 wins and one draw. He suffered his first defeat against the former world welterweight and middleweight champion Emile Griffith in a non-title fight in June 1970.

Bogs won the European light-heavyweight title in 1968 when he stopped German champion Lothar Stengel in the first round of the bout. "Folkets helt" (the people's hero) successfully defended the title against Piero Del Papa before moving down to the middleweight division for a title match against European champion Carlos Duran. Bogs defeated Duran and went on to successfully defend his middleweight title three times before losing a rematch to Duran in 1970.

In 1972 he earned a title shot against reigning world middleweight champion Carlos Monzón. Bogs was stopped in five rounds. Bogs later moved back up to the light-heavyweight division and notched wins over contenders Vicente Rondon and Mike Quarry. He lost to John Conteh in a bid to regain the European light-heavyweight title, and retired from boxing in 1974.

Bogs died in Copenhagen on 22 December 2023, at the age of 79.

=== 1964 Olympic results ===
Bogs' results as a light-middleweight boxer at the 1964 Tokyo Olympics:

- Round of 32: bye
- Round of 16: defeated Chen Bai-Sun, referee stopped contest
- Quarterfinal: lost to Nojim Maiyegun, referee stopped contest

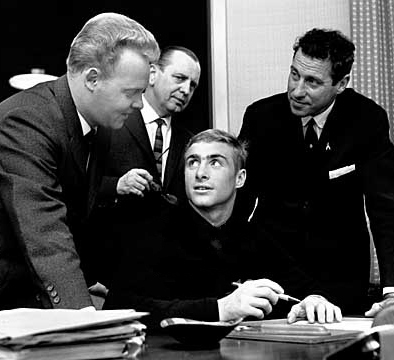
Bogs signs his professional contract in October 1964, looking at his promoter Mogens Palle. His father Poul stands on the other side
