= Marion Wilson (boxer) =

American boxer

Personal information
- Nicknames: Mo; Jackhammer; The Creep
- Nationality: American
- Born: Marion Wilson; October 19, 1956 (age 69) Florence, South Carolina, U.S.
- Height: 6 ft 1 in (1.85 m)
- Weight: Heavyweight

Boxing career
- Reach: 77 in (196 cm)
- Stance: Orthodox

Boxing record
- Total fights: 57
- Wins: 12
- Win by KO: 5
- Losses: 41
- Draws: 4

Marion Wilson (born October 19, 1956) is an American former professional boxer who competed from 1989 to 2007.

== Amateur career ==
Wilson took up boxing at the age of 27.

== Professional career ==
Nicknamed "The Creep" and "Jackhammer", Wilson turned professional in 1989 and immediately established himself as a tough journeyman opponent for the heavyweight elite. Despite a lackluster record, he has faced, and has lost decisions to, fighters including Oliver McCall, Samuel Peter, Hasim Rahman, Andrew Golota, Shannon Briggs and Ike Ibeabuchi (the latter caught him on a two-days notice, Ibeabuchi was scheduled to fight Corey Sanders for the Tuesday Night Fights, but Sanders quit a few days prior to the scheduled fight, event promoters in a hurry began to look for a substitute, and Wilson took the chance.) One of his notable victories was against rising, undefeated Thomas Williams, who was Wilson's roommate at the time, and who is best known for being the only fighter to be jailed for fight fixing. Wilson, despite losing 41 fights, was never knocked down, nor received a standing eight count in a bout. Hence, he is considered one of boxing's "best chins". Wilson also defeated boxers such as Mike Hunter, Corey Sanders, and Paea Wolfgramm, while his fight against WBO heavyweight champion Ray Mercer resulted in a draw.

Wilson felt he was "robbed" of his victories in fights against Orlin Norris, and Obed Sullivan, via the judges' decision (holding Don King responsible).

Wilson, despite having faced some of the hardest punchers of his era, was never knocked down or stopped in his professional career. As a result, he is considered by many to have one of the best chins in boxing history, and boxing writer James Slater included him on a list of boxing's best "chins" and Livefight.com ranked him as #8 in terms of best heavyweight chins ever. Wilson faced virtually all notable prospects of his time with perfect records, stopping several promising winning streaks. In the words of ESPN's boxing analyst Al Bernstein, Wilson is a veteran fighter, who "has not won many fights, but always gives these youngsters a tough time."

== Professional boxing record ==
57 fights	12 wins	41 losses
By knockout	5	0
By decision	7	41
Draws	4	

No.	Result	Record	Opponent	Type	Round, time	Date	Location	Notes
57	Loss	12-41-4	Oliver McCall	UD	8	Feb 24, 2007	ABC Sports Complex, Springfield, Virginia U.S.	
56	Loss	12-40-4	Chazz Witherspoon	UD	4	Jun 16, 2005	Michael’s Eighth Avenue, Glen Burnie, Maryland, U.S.	
55	Loss	12-39-4	Oliver McCall	DQ	6	Feb 5, 2005	Convention Center, Washington, D.C., U.S.	Wilson disqualified for excessive holding
54	Win	12-38-4	Jason Waller	KO	4 (8), 0:58	Nov 19, 2004	Du Burns Arena, Baltimore, Maryland, U.S.	
53	Draw	11-38-4	Jason Waller	MD	4	Oct 15, 2004	Jaycees Community Center, Waldorf, Maryland, U.S.	
52	Loss	11-38-3	Samuel Peter	UD	4	Mar 3, 2002	Catholic Youth Center, Scranton, Pennsylvania, U.S.	
51	Loss	11-37-3	Tony Thompson	UD	6	Feb 2, 2002	Ramada Inn, New Carrollton, Maryland, U.S.	
50	Loss	11-36-3	Robert Wiggins	PTS	6	Jun 29, 2001	Sands Casino Hotel, Atlantic City, New Jersey, U.S.	
49	Loss	11-35-3	Robert Davis	UD	8	Feb 22, 2001	Zembo Shrine, Harrisburg, Pennsylvania, U.S.	
48	Loss	11-34-3	Faruq Saleem	UD	10	Jan 12, 2001	Sands Casino Hotel, Atlantic City, New Jersey, U.S.	
47	Loss	11-33-3	Jason Robinson	UD	8	May 17, 2000	Hammerstein Ballroom, New York City, New York, U.S.	
46	Loss	11-32-3	Hasim Rahman	UD	10	Mar 1, 2000	Martin’s West, Woodlawn, Maryland, U.S.	
45	Loss	11-31-3	Larry Donald	TD	5	Jun 12, 1999	Shriner’s Auditorium, Wilmington, Massachusetts, U.S.	
44	Loss	11-30-3	Oleg Maskaev	UD	8	Dec 8, 1998	Roseland Ballroom, New York City, New York, U.S.	
43	Loss	11-29-3	Michael Rush	UD	10	Nov 12, 1998	Coeur d’Alene Casino, Worley, Idaho, U.S.	
42	Loss	11-28-3	Derrick Jefferson	UD	8	Oct 2, 1998	Civic Center, Lake Charles, Louisiana, U.S.	
41	Loss	11-27-3	David Izon	UD	8	Jul 18, 1998	Madison Square Garden Theater, New York City, New York, U.S.	
40	Loss	11-26-3	Ezra Sellers	UD	10	Jun 12, 1998	Belle of Baton Rouge Casino, Baton Rouge, Louisiana, U.S.	
39	Win	11-25-3	Paea Wolfgramm	MD	6	May 9, 1998	Atlantic City, New Jersey, U.S.	
38	Loss	10-25-3	Shazzon Bradley	UD	8	Apr 24, 1998	Sherbrooke, Quebec, Canada	
37	Loss	10-24-3	Greg Page	UD	8	Mar 27, 1998	Atlantic City, New Jersey, U.S.	
36	Win	10-23-3	Corey Sanders	UD	8	Oct 29, 1997	Glen Burnie, Maryland, U.S.	
35	Loss	9-23-3	Robert Hawkins	UD	10	Jul 20, 1997	Atlantic City, New Jersey, U.S	
34	Loss	9-22-3	Carl Williams	UD	10	Jun 13, 1997	Port Chester, New York, U.S	
33	Loss	9-21-3	Ike Ibeabuchi	UD	10	Mar 6, 1997	Asbury Park, New Jersey, U.S.	
32	Loss	9-20-3	Orlin Norris	SD	10	Nov 14, 1996	Glen Burnie, Maryland, U.S.	
31	Win	9-19-3	Thomas Williams	TKO	1 (10), 1:53	Jun 14, 1996	Philadelphia, Pennsylvania, U.S.	
30	Loss	8-19-3	Terrence Lewis	UD	8	Apr 19, 1996	Philadelphia, Pennsylvania, U.S	
29	Loss	8-18-3	Obed Sullivan	MD	10	Dec 13, 1995	Atlantic City, New Jersey, U.S.	
28	Loss	8-17-3	Jeff Wooden	MD	10	Nov 3, 1995	Las Vegas, Nevada, U.S.	
27	Win	8-16-3	Mike Hunter	SD	10	Oct 6, 1995	Atlantic City, New Jersey, U.S.	
26	Loss	7-16-3	David Izon	DQ	5	Aug 23, 1995	Le Cannet, Alpes-Maritimes, France	
25	Loss	7-15-3	Andrew Golota	UD	10	Apr 11, 1995	Chicago, Illinois, U.S.	
24	Loss	7-14-3	Shannon Briggs	UD	8	Mar 24, 1995	West Orange, New Jersey, U.S.	
23	Loss	7-13-3	Kirk Johnson	UD	8	Feb 3, 1995	Bushkill, Pennsylvania, U.S.	
22	Loss	7-12-3	Aurelio Perez	PTS	10	Jan 3, 1995	Recife, Pernambuco, Brazil	
21	Loss	7-11-3	Zeljko Mavrovic	PTS	8	Oct 8, 1994	Halle, North Rhine-Westphalia, Germany	
20	Loss	7-10-3	Jimmy Thunder	UD	10	Sep 1, 1994	Albuquerque, New Mexico, U.S.	
19	Draw	7-9-3	Ray Mercer	SD	10	Jul 28, 1994	Atlantic City, New Jersey, U.S.	
18	Win	7-9-2	Thomas Williams	UD	6	Jun 4, 1994	Reno, Nevada, U.S.	
17	Loss	6-9-2	Vaughn Bean	UD	6	Feb 26, 1994	Atlantic City, New Jersey, U.S.	
16	Loss	6-8-2	Jade Scott	UD	10	Nov 30, 1993	Woodlawn, Maryland, U.S.	
15	Loss	6-7-2	Andrew Golota	PTS	8	Jul 10, 1993	Bushkill Pennsylvania, U.S.	
14	Loss	6-6-2	Jeremy Williams	UD	8	Mar 25, 1993	Atlantic City, New Jersey, U.S.	
13	Loss	6-5-2	Tyrell Biggs	UD	10	Dec 8, 1992	Tampa, Florida, U.S.	
12	Loss	6-4-2	Francois Botha	PTS	8	May 29, 1992	Amarillo, Texas, U.S.	
11	Win	6-3-2	Derek Isaman	SD	6	May 14, 1992	Atlantic City, New Jersey, U.S.	
10	Loss	5-3-2	Boris Powell	UD	6	Mar 27, 1992	Atlantic City, New Jersey, U.S.	
9	Draw	5-2-2	Gerard Jones	PTS	6	Nov 7, 1991	Washington, D.C., U.S.	
8	Loss	5-2-1	Derek Isaman	TD	2	Aug 9, 1991	Atlantic City, New Jersey, U.S.	
7	Loss	5-1-1	Boris Powell	UD	4	Jun 13, 1991	Philadelphia, Pennsylvania, U.S.	
6	Win	5-0-1	Bruce Johnson	KO	3 (?), 2:40	Mar 14, 1991	Glen Burnie, Maryland, U.S.	
5	Win	4-0-1	Robert Jackson, Jr.	DQ	1	Nov 14, 1990	Glen Burnie, Maryland, U.S.	
4	Win	3-0-1	Maurice Gray	KO	4 (4)	Sep 6, 1990	Baltimore, Maryland, U.S.	
3	Win	2-0-1	James Thompson	SD	4	Jul 21, 1990	Washington, D.C., U.S.	
2	Win	1-0-1	Bilal Muhammad	TKO	4 (4)	Feb 13, 1990	Pikesville, Maryland, U.S.	
1	Draw	0-0-1	Charles Dread	PTS	4	Aug 14, 1989	Baltimore, Maryland, U.S.	
