= Maurice Harris (boxer) =

American boxer (born 1976)

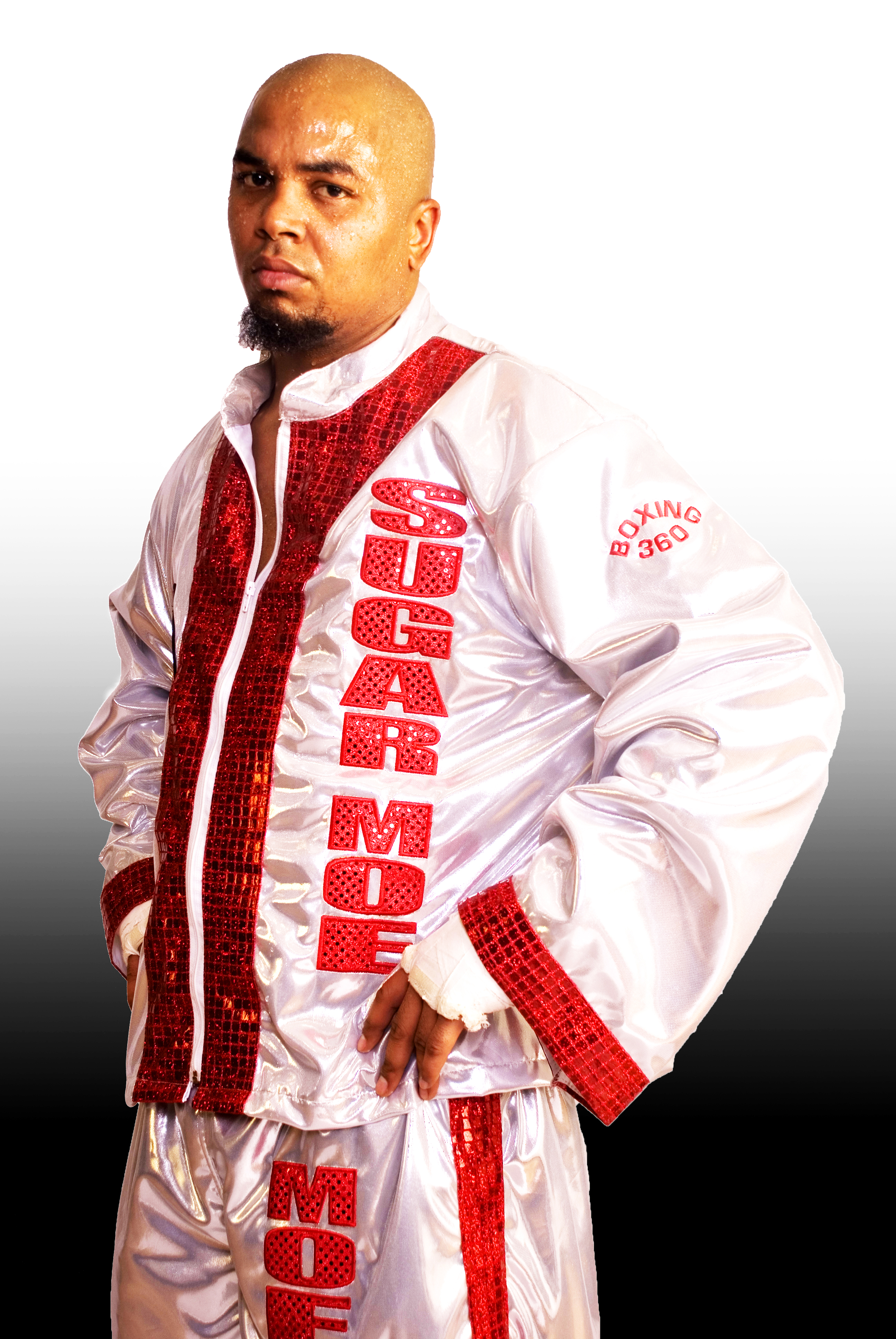
- Maurice "Sugar Moe" Harris

Personal information
- Nickname: Mo Bettah
- Nationality: United States
- Born: Wilbur Maurice Harris; February 21, 1976 (age 50) East Orange, New Jersey, U.S.
- Height: 6 ft 4 in (1.93 m)
- Weight: Heavyweight; Cruiserweight; Light Heavyweight

Boxing career
- Reach: 80 in (203 cm)
- Stance: Orthodox

Boxing record
- Total fights: 52
- Wins: 26
- Win by KO: 11
- Losses: 22
- Draws: 3
- No contests: 1

Wilbur Maurice Harris (born February 21, 1976), nicknamed "Sugar Moe", is the former United States Boxing Association heavyweight champion. A professional competitor since 1992, he holds notable victories over Siarhei Liakhovich, David Izon, James Thunder, and Jeremy Williams. As a professional, Harris also faced world champions and contenders Larry Holmes, Vaughn Bean, Derrick Jefferson, Chris Byrd, Henry Akinwande, Fres Oquendo, Tony Thompson, Kubrat Pulev, Amir Mansour, Alexander Ustinov, and Albert Sosnowski.

== Professional career ==
Maurice Harris turned pro at 16 as a light heavyweight in 1992, and faced many up-and-coming prospects and comebacking champions. In his early professional years, he lost to future number one contender Vaughn Bean, and defeated 18-0-0 David Izon.

On May 12, 2001, Harris lost a 12-round decision in his first attempt to win the vacant United States Boxing Association (USBA) heavyweight title against future world heavyweight champion Chris Byrd.

In 1997 he lost a disputed split decision to former champion Larry Holmes. He followed the Holmes bout with a seven fight winning streak in 1998–99. This included defeating former number one heavyweight contender Jeremy Williams, and culminated in a fight on HBO with Derrick Jefferson. In what was labeled as the 1999 Ring Magazine knockout of the year, Harris was brutally knocked out by a vicious left hook.

In 1998 Harris was the chief sparring partner for heavyweight world champion Lennox Lewis and maintained this position for several years.

In 2002, Harris knocked out future heavyweight champion 19-0 Siarhei Liakhovich in the 9th round. Later that year, Harris won the Thunderbox Heavyweight Tournament "Fistful of Dollars" in Atlantic City, New Jersey. The round-robin exhibition event consisted of eight heavyweights doing battle in three, three-minute rounds. Harris outpointed Gerald Nobles, future number one contender Tony Thompson and Israel Garcia in the same evening to win the $100,000 purse.

=== Comeback ===
After a three-year layoff, Harris made a comeback in 2010 in the heavyweight division. Under the guidance of promoter Mario Yagobi of Boxing360, Harris returned to the ring. Harris won the vacant United States Boxing Association heavyweight title in his second opportunity with a 12-round unanimous decision over Nagy Aguilera at the Grand Casino in Hinckley, Minnesota. However, on May 27, 2011, Harris lost an eliminator bout for the IBF # 2 position at Reno Events Center in Reno, Nevada. On July 16, 2011, Harris defended his USBA heavyweight title in Atlantic City, New Jersey on July 16, 2011, with a 12th-round knockout over challenger Derric Rossy.

== Professional boxing record ==
52 fights	26 wins	22 losses
By knockout	11	15
By decision	14	7
By disqualification	1	0
Draws	3	
No contests	1	

Result	Record	Opponent	Type	Round, time	Date	Location	Notes
Loss	26–22–3 (1)	(Kazakhstan) Ivan Dychko	KO	1 (8), 1:39	06/07/2018	(United States) Seminole Hard Rock Hotel and Casino, Hollywood FL	
Loss	26–21–3 (1)	(Bulgaria) Kubrat Pulev	KO	1 (8), 1:59	05/12/2015	(Germany) Inselparkhalle, Wilhelmsburg, Hamburg	
Loss	26–20–3 (1)	(Russia) Alexander Ustinov	KO	1 (10)	10/10/2015	El Poliedro, Caracas, Venezuela	
Draw	26–19–3 (1)	(United States) Grover Young	SD	8	05/09/2015	(United States) Seminole Hard Rock Hotel and Casino, Hollywood	
Loss	26–19–2 (1)	(Russia) Andrey Fedosov	KO	2 (8)	18/04/2014	(United States) Horseshoe Casino, Hammond, Indiana	
Loss	26–18–2 (1)	(United States) Amir Mansour	UD	12	23/08/2013	(United States) Dover Downs Hotel & Casino, Dover, Delaware	For vacant USBA heavyweight and World Boxing Federation Intercontinental heavyweight title
Win	26–17–2 (1)	(United States) Jason Bergman	SD	6	03/05/2013	(United States) University of California of PA Convocation Center, California, Pennsylvania	
Loss	25–17–2 (1)	(Poland) Albert Sosnowski	SD	3	20/06/2012	(United Kingdom) London, England	
Loss	25–16–2 (1)	(Germany) Edmund Gerber	UD	8	05/05/2012	Erfurt, Germany	
Win	25–15–2 (1)	(United States) Derric Rossy	TKO	12	16/07/2011	Atlantic City, New Jersey, United States	USBA Heavyweight Title. Referee stopped the bout at 1:35 of the 12th round.
Loss	24–15–2 (1)	(United States) Tony Thompson	TKO	3	27/05/2011	Reno, Nevada, United States	
Win	24–14–2 (1)	(Dominican Republic) Nagy Aguilera	UD	12	06/08/2010	Hinckley, Minnesota, United States	USBA Heavyweight Title.
Win	23–14–2 (1)	(United States) Robert Hawkins	UD	8	15/04/2010	New York City, United States	
Win	22–14–2 (1)	(United States) Julius Long	UD	6	26/03/2010	Chicago, Illinois, United States	
Win	21–14–2 (1)	(United States) Billy Zumbrun	UD	6	29/01/2010	Albuquerque, New Mexico, United States	
NC	20–14–2 (1)	(United States) Rodney Wallace	NC	4	17/11/2007	Winston-Salem, North Carolina, United States	
Loss	20-14-2	(United States) Tye Fields	RTD	4	14/07/2006	Las Vegas, Nevada, United States	
Win	20-13-2	(United States) Franklin Edmondson	UD	8	26/01/2006	Charleston, South Carolina, United States	
Loss	19-13-2	(United States) Fres Oquendo	KO	10	Mar 1, 2003	Las Vegas, Nevada, United States	
Win	19-12-2	(Belarus) Sergei Liakhovich	KO	9	01/06/2002	Atlantic City, New Jersey, United States	
Loss	18-12-2	(United Kingdom) Henry Akinwande	KO	1	16/06/2001	Cincinnati, Ohio, United States	
Loss	18-11-2	(United States) Chris Byrd	UD	12	12/05/2001	New York City, United States	USBA Heavyweight Title.
Win	18-10-2	(United States) Harold Sconiers	UD	8	16/12/2000	Pittsburgh, Pennsylvania, United States	
Win	17-10-2	(United States) Bradley Rone	UD	8	05/08/2000	Madison, Wisconsin, United States	
Loss	16-10-2	(United States) Derrick Jefferson	KO	6	06/11/1999	Atlantic City, New Jersey, United States	
Win	16-9-2	(United States) Israel Cole	UD	10	11/09/1999	Las Vegas, Nevada, United States	
Win	15-9-2	(United States) Jeremy Williams	UD	10	19/06/1999	New York City, United States	
Win	14-9-2	(United States) Louis Monaco	TKO	1	May 22, 1999	Las Vegas, Nevada, United States	
Win	13-9-2	(United States) Artis Pendergrass	TKO	4	Dec 19, 1998	Miami, Florida, United States	
Win	12-9-2	(United States) Orion Sistrunk	KO	1	01/10/1998	Newark, New Jersey, United States	
Win	11-9-2	(United States) Danny Wofford	DQ	6	27/06/1998	Alexandria, Virginia, United States	
Win	10-9-2	(United States) Rashid Latif	KO	1	18/04/1998	Alexandria, Virginia, United States	
Loss	9-9-2	(United States) Larry Holmes	SD	10	29/07/1997	New York City, United States	
Win	9-8-2	(New Zealand) Jimmy Thunder	KO	7	20/05/1997	Lyndhurst, New Jersey, United States	Thunder knocked out at 2:44 of the seventh round.
Win	8-8-2	(United States) Sam Hampton	TKO	4	26/04/1997	Atlantic City, New Jersey, United States	
Loss	7-8-2	(United States) Gerald Nobles	KO	3	30/07/1996	Philadelphia, Pennsylvania, United States	Harris knocked out at 1:20 of the third round.
Win	7-7-2	(United States) Terrell Nelson	UD	6	16/07/1996	Atlantic City, New Jersey, United States	
Loss	6-7-2	(United States) Dayton Wheeler	MD	6	19/06/1996	Newark, New Jersey, United States	
Win	6-6-2	(Nigeria) David Izon	UD	8	15/03/1996	Atlantic City, New Jersey, United States	
Loss	5-6-2	(Canada) Dale Brown	KO	3	16/08/1995	Newark, New Jersey, United States	
Loss	5-5-2	(United States) Vaughn Bean	KO	3	29/10/1994	Atlantic City, New Jersey, United States	
Loss	5-4-2	(United States) John Andrade	TKO	6	27/06/1994	Providence, Rhode Island, United States	
Draw	5-3-2	(United States) Zuri Lawrence	PTS	4	21/06/1994	Boston, Massachusetts, United States	
Win	5-3-1	(Barbados) Richie Brown	UD	4	23/04/1994	Schenectady, New York, United States	
Win	4-3-1	(United States) Ettol Windham	UD	4	22/03/1994	Pensacola, Florida, United States	
Draw	3-3-1	(United States) Richie Brown	PTS	4	21/01/1994	New York City, United States	
Win	3-3	(United States) Tom Murray	TKO	1	01/10/1993	New York City, United States	
Loss	2-3	(United States) Scott Lopeck	KO	3	07/05/1993	New York City, United States	
Loss	2-2	(United States) Richard Frazier	TKO	4	20/03/1993	New York City, United States	
Win	2-1	(United States) Michael Taylor	TKO	1	27/02/1993	Bushkill, Pennsylvania, United States	
Win	1-1	(United States) Anthony Harris	TKO	1	12/02/1993	Bushkill, Pennsylvania, United States	
Loss	0-1	(United States) Joe Kenna	UD	4	04/12/1992	Bushkill, Pennsylvania, United States	
