= Mogens Palle =

Danish boxing promoter and manager (1934–2022)

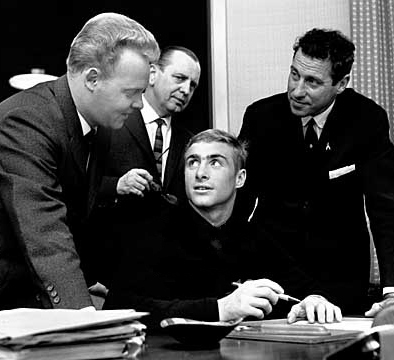
- Tom Bogs talks to Palle (left) while signing his professional contract in 1964

Personal information
- Born: 14 March 1934
- Died: 27 August 2022 (aged 88)

Sport
- Sport: Boxing

Mogens Palle (14 March 1934 – 27 August 2022) was a Danish professional boxing promoter and manager. He was involved in more than 200 matches for European and world titles and worked with Ayub Kalule, Tom Bogs, Jimmy Bredahl, Thomas Damgaard, Brian Nielsen, Chris Christensen, Jørgen Hansen, Steffen Tangstad, and Mikkel Kessler, among other boxers. In the mid-1960s he was the European manager of Sonny Liston, and in 2001 organized the match between Mike Tyson and Brian Nielsen in Denmark. He also brought to Denmark boxing stars like Carlos Monzón, Larry Holmes, Emile Griffith, Ken Buchanan, and John Conteh. During his career he worked together with his father Thorkild and daughter Bettina. In 2008 he was inducted into the International Boxing Hall of Fame.
