= Corey Sanders =

American boxer

Personal information
- Nickname: T-Rex
- Nationality: American
- Born: Corey Sanders; March 7, 1975 (age 51) Washington, D.C., U.S.
- Height: 6 ft 6 in (198 cm)
- Weight: Heavyweight

Boxing career

Boxing record
- Total fights: 36
- Wins: 23
- Win by KO: 15
- Losses: 13

Corey Sanders (born March 7, 1975) is an American boxing trainer and former professional boxer. Known as "T-Rex", Sanders' most notable victory came in an upset knockout against future WBC world champion Oleg Maskaev in 2002, which temporarily derailed Maskaev's plans of fighting for a title. Sanders' other notable opponents included Michael Grant, Andrew Golota, DaVarryl Williamson and Timo Hoffmann. Sanders is perhaps best remembered for his wild brawl with Golota, which saw both fighters trading heavy blows on the inside throughout the fight, and Sanders receiving a gruesome, deep cut above his left eye.

== Background ==
Born and raised in Washington D.C., Sanders attended Theodore Roosevelt High School where he was All-City lineman in football. Sanders turned down various college football offers to stay home and take care of his mother, who was sick. He attended Montgomery College.

== Amateur career ==
Sanders began boxing in 1993 at the age of 19, and had a very brief amateur career before turning professional a year later in 1994.

== Professional career ==
Sanders gained widespread media attention in late 2006, when he fought a series of four-round exhibition bouts against former undisputed heavyweight Mike Tyson during a world tour, which was organized to help pay off Tyson's financial debts. Tyson fought without headgear against the headgeared Sanders, and Tyson appeared to be holding back during the bouts to prevent an early end to the show.

He last fought in December 2007, dropping a six rounds decision to Dennis Bakhtov, which became his seventh loss in a row. His current professional record stands at 23 wins (15 KO), and 13 losses out of 36 fights.

== Professional boxing record ==
23 Wins (15 knockouts, 8 decisions), 13 Losses (3 knockouts, 10 decisions)
Result	Record	Opponent	Type	Round	Date	Location	Notes
Loss	23-13	(Russia) Denis Bakhtov	UD	6	23/12/2007	Halle an der Saale, Sachsen-Anhalt, Germany	
Loss	23-12	(Germany) Steffen Kretschmann	UD	8	19/10/2007	Neukoeln, Berlin, Germany	
Loss	23-11	(Trinidad and Tobago) Kertson Manswell	UD	10	14/10/2006	Bacolet, Trinidad and Tobago	
Loss	23-10	(Germany) Timo Hoffmann	UD	12	28/02/2004	Dresden, Sachsen, Germany	WBO Intercontinental Heavyweight Title.
Loss	23-9	(Russia) Nikolay Popov	UD	8	30/01/2004	Ekaterinburg, Russia	
Loss	23-8	(Cuba) Elieser Castillo	UD	12	30/10/2003	(United States) Coconut Creek, Florida, U.S.	NABF Heavyweight Title.
Loss	23-7	(United States) DaVarryl Williamson	TKO	5	26/07/2002	(United States) Chester, West Virginia, U.S.	Referee stopped the bout at 3:00 of the fifth round.
Win	23-6	(Uzbekistan) Oleg Maskaev	TKO	8	17/03/2002	(United States) Oroville, California, U.S.	Referee stopped the bout at 2:45 of the eighth round.
Win	22-6	(United States) Terrence Lewis	MD	10	12/01/2002	(United States) Laughlin, Nevada, U.S.	
Win	21-6	(Tonga) Paea Wolfgramm	TKO	9	08/08/2001	(United States) Elgin, Illinois, U.S.	Referee stopped the bout at 1:54 of the ninth round.
Win	20-6	(United States) Willie Williams	TKO	4	06/07/2001	(United States) Reno, Nevada, U.S.	
Win	19-6	(United States) Garing Lane	UD	6	28/04/2001	(United States) LaPorte, Indiana, U.S.	
Win	18-6	(United States) Jeff Lally	TKO	2	12/11/1998	(United States) Worley, Idaho, U.S.	Referee stopped the bout at 2:02 of the second round.
Win	17-6	(United States) Arthur Weathers	TKO	2	22/09/1998	(United States) New York City, U.S.	
Loss	16-6	(Poland) Andrew Golota	UD	10	21/07/1998	(United States) Atlantic City, New Jersey, U.S.	
Win	16-5	(United States) James Gaines	UD	10	20/02/1998	(United States) Baton Rouge, Louisiana, U.S.	
Win	15-5	(United States) Melvin Foster	TKO	6	09/01/1998	(United States) Atlantic City, New Jersey, U.S.	
Loss	14-5	(United States) Marion Wilson	UD	8	29/10/1997	(United States) Glen Burnie, Maryland, U.S.	
Win	14-4	(United States) Derrick Lampkins	PTS	8	16/09/1997	(United States) Nashville, Tennessee, U.S.	
Win	13-4	(United States) Danny Wofford	DQ	7	23/08/1997	(United States) Alexandria, Virginia, U.S.	
Win	12-4	(Austria) Biko Botowamungu	TKO	2	14/05/1997	(United States) Glen Burnie, Maryland, U.S.	Referee stopped the bout at 3:00 of the second round.
Win	11-4	(United States) Lynwood Jones	TKO	4	13/03/1997	(United States) Glen Burnie, Maryland, U.S.	Referee stopped the bout at 2:16 of the fourth round.
Loss	10-4	(United States) Jerry Ballard	TKO	6	28/06/1996	(United States) Upper Marlboro, Maryland, U.S.	IBC World Heavyweight Title. Referee stopped the bout at 1:37 of the sixth round.
Loss	10-3	(United States) Michael Grant	TKO	2	15/03/1996	(United States) Atlantic City, New Jersey, U.S.	
Win	10-2	(United States) Tony Bradham	UD	6	09/02/1996	(United States) Atlantic City, New Jersey, U.S.	
Win	9-2	(United States) Mike Whitfield	PTS	6	30/11/1995	(United States) Greenbelt, Maryland, U.S.	
Win	8-2	Dale Henry	TKO	1	15/10/1995	(United States) Washington, D.C., U.S.	
Win	7-2	(United States) Mike Mitchell	TKO	5	12/09/1995	(United States) Woodlawn, Maryland, U.S.	
Win	6-2	Cohen Cosby	KO	1	30/08/1995	(United States) Washington, District of Columbia, U.S.	
Loss	5-2	(Syria) Ahmed Abdin	PTS	6	18/08/1995	(United States) Middletown, New York, U.S.	
Win	5-1	(United States) Ken Moody	TKO	1	29/07/1995	(United States) Washington, D.C., U.S.	
Win	4-1	Tony Campbell	PTS	4	06/06/1995	(United States) Woodlawn, Maryland, U.S.	
Loss	3-1	(United States) Mark Connolly	PTS	4	22/04/1995	(United States) Las Vegas, Nevada, U.S.	
Win	3-0	(United States) Anthony Hunt	TKO	1	11/03/1995	(United States) Las Vegas, Nevada, U.S.	
Win	2-0	(United States) Russell Perry	TKO	4	01/11/1994	(United States) Woodlawn, Maryland, U.S.	
Win	1-0	Anthony Thomas	TKO	2	23/09/1994	(United States) Upper Marlboro, Maryland, U.S.	

== Exhibition boxing record ==
1 fight	0 wins	0 losses
Non-scored	1	

No.	Result	Record	Opponent	Type	Round, time	Date	Location	Notes
1	—N/a	0–0 (1)	(United States) Mike Tyson	—N/a	4	Oct 20, 2006	(United States) Chevrolet Centre, Youngstown, Ohio, U.S.	Non-scored bout
