= Brian Nielsen (boxer) =

Danish boxer (born 1965)

Personal information
- Nicknames: Super Brian; Bokse Brian ("Boxing Brian"); Boksebamsen ("The Boxing Teddybear")
- Nationality: Danish
- Born: 1 April 1965 (age 61) Korsør, Denmark
- Height: 1.91 m (6 ft 3 in)
- Weight: Heavyweight

Boxing career
- Reach: 196 cm (77 in)
- Stance: Orthodox

Boxing record
- Total fights: 67
- Wins: 64
- Win by KO: 43
- Losses: 3
Medal record
Representing Denmark
Men's boxing
Olympic Games
Bronze medal – third place	1992 Barcelona	Super heavyweight
European Amateur Championships
Bronze medal – third place	1991 Gothenburg	Super heavyweight

Brian Nielsen (born 1 April 1965) is a Danish former professional boxer and Olympic bronze medalist. He held the IBO heavyweight title from 1996 to 1999 successfully defending it five times, including against Larry Holmes and Phil Jackson, the second highest number of defenses behind Wladimir Klitschko's record of 18. At one point of time, he equaled Rocky Marciano's record of 49 successive wins with no losses. While he never held a world title from any of the main four sanctioning bodies (WBC, IBF, WBA, WBO), he did defeat several former world champions who had, including James Smith, Jeff Lampkin, Tony Tubbs, Carlos De León, Tim Witherspoon, Orlin Norris, and Uriah Grant.

== Amateur career ==
As an amateur, Nielsen won bronze medals in the super heavyweight division at the 1991 European Championships and the 1992 Olympics in Barcelona.

Brian Nielsen was sent to Svendborg, where Johnny Antonsen had arranged a match against the local hero Carsten Dahl. Nielsen easily beat Dahl, winning the bout by knockout in the second round. Dahl later got the opportunity for revenge, but again Nielsen won by knockout.

He was both Zealand champion and Danish champion for five consecutive years (1988–1992), and also won numerous international tournaments. His career as an amateur ended after the Olympics in Barcelona in 1992 where he won the bronze. In the semifinals he lost to the powerful Cuban Roberto Balado. Balado won 15 to 1.

In total, Nielsen boxed 111 fights as an amateur and won 104. He only took a count once in amateur career, and only once was he stopped before time, during the 1989 European Championship bout, where he suffered a cut near one of his eyes. His opponent at this match was the Greek boxer George Tsachakis who attended the final.

== Professional career ==
After his win over 41-year-old ex-World Boxing Association champion James 'Bonecrusher' Smith in October 1994, Nielsen began to attract attention. He went on to hold the minor IBO belt during an unbeaten streak equaling that of legend Rocky Marciano. He later held the minor IBC belt.

=== Tyson fight ===
On 13 October 2001, Nielsen fought Mike Tyson at the Parken Stadium in Copenhagen. After six rounds heavily in Tyson's favour, Nielsen quit on his stool, citing an eye injury. Nielsen was knocked down once in the third round.

=== Announced comeback and Holyfield fight ===
On February 8, 2010, Brian Nielsen told reporters that he was prepared to return to the ring, after 8 years of absence, and that a proposed fight against Evander Holyfield had been met with interest by both sides. Though originally thought unrealistic by former promoter Mogens Palle, due to Nielsen's bad knee, Nielsen's comeback was confirmed by Nielsen's promoter Sauerland Event on June 1, 2010.

Nielsen met Holyfield on May 7, 2011 in a World Boxing Federation (WBF) title bout, in Copenhagen. Holyfield won the fight, knocking Nielsen down in the 3rd with a left hook and stopping him by TKO in the 10th.

=== Match throwing incident ===
Controversy arose in early 2004, when journeyman heavyweight Thomas Williams stated that he had been bribed to throw his fight against Nielsen in March, 2000. Along with promoter Robert Mitchell, Williams was indicted by the United States District Court for the District of Nevada for match fixing in order to promote the career of Richie Melito, and it was during the FBI's investigation of that case that Williams admitted to intentionally losing to Nielsen. The fix was arranged by promoter Robert Mittleman, a frequent associate of Nielsen's promoter Mogens Palle, who later confessed that he had been paid $1,000, while Williams had received "up to $40,000" from Palle in order to lose the fight. Williams, Mitchell and Mittleman were all found guilty of sports bribery by the court in November and December, 2004.

The Nielsen vs. Williams fight was the 57th of Nielsen's career. Nielsen and Mogens Palle denied any knowledge of the match fixing, and were not charged of any wrongdoing by American or Danish authorities.

== Professional boxing record ==
67 fights	64 wins	3 losses
By knockout	43	3
By decision	21	0

Result	Record	Opponent	Type	Round, time	Date	Location	Notes
Loss	64–3	Evander Holyfield	TKO	10 (12)	2011-05-07	Koncerthuset, Copenhagen, Denmark	
Win	64–2	Uriah Grant	UD	8	2002-04-19	Falconer Centret, Frederiksberg, Denmark	
Win	63–2	Ken Murphy	UD	8	2001-11-16	Roskilde Hallerne, Roskilde, Denmark	
Loss	62–2	Mike Tyson	RTD	6 (10)	2001-10-13	Parken Stadium, Copenhagen, Denmark	
Win	62–1	Orlin Norris	UD	12	2001-06-16	Brøndby Hallen, Brøndby, Denmark	Retained IBC heavyweight title
Win	61–1	Benji Baker	TKO	6 (8)	2001-04-27	Aalborg Hallen, Aalborg, Denmark	
Win	60–1	Dicky Ryan	UD	8	2000-12-01	Viborg Stadionhal, Viborg, Denmark	
Win	59–1	Andy Sample	TKO	2 (8)	2000-11-03	K.B. Hallen, Copenhagen, Denmark	
Win	58–1	Kevin Cook	KO	1 (8)	2000-10-06	Næstved Hallen, Næstved, Denmark	
Win	57–1	Jeremy Williams	TKO	5 (12)	2000-04-28	K.B. Hallen, Copenhagen, Denmark	Retained IBC heavyweight title
Win	56–1	Thomas Williams	KO	3 (8)	2000-03-31	Esbjerg Stadionhal, Esbjerg, Denmark	
Win	55–1	Jeff Pegues	KO	3 (8)	2000-02-18	Aalborg Hallen, Aalborg, Denmark	
Win	54–1	Troy Weida	KO	8 (12)	2000-01-14	Kolding Hallen, Kolding, Denmark	Won vacant IBC heavyweight title
Win	53–1	Frank Wood	KO	2 (8)	1999-11-26	Viborg, Denmark	
Win	52–1	Don Normand	KO	1 (8)	1999-10-29	K.B. Hallen, Copenhagen, Denmark	
Win	51–1	Dale Crowe	UD	8	1999-10-01	Randers Hallen, Randers, Denmark	
Win	50–1	Shane Sutcliffe	KO	5 (8)	1999-09-03	K.B. Hallen, Copenhagen, Denmark	
Loss	49–1	Dicky Ryan	TKO	10 (10)	1999-06-18	Idrættens Hus, Vejle, Denmark	
Win	49–0	Tim Witherspoon	TKO	4 (10)	1999-04-16	K.B. Hallen, Copenhagen, Denmark	
Win	48–0	Paul Phillips	KO	2 (8)	1999-03-19	Falconer Centret, Frederiksberg, Denmark	
Win	47–0	Peter McNeeley	KO	3 (8)	1999-02-12	Falconer Centret, Frederiksberg, Denmark	
Win	46–0	Dan Murphy	TKO	2 (8)	1998-11-27	Vejlby-Risskov Hallen, Aarhus, Denmark	
Win	45–0	Lionel Butler	KO	1 (12)	1998-11-06	K.B. Hallen, Copenhagen, Denmark	Retained IBO heavyweight title
Win	44–0	Garing Lane	KO	2 (8)	1998-09-18	Aalborg Hallen, Aalborg, Denmark	
Win	43–0	Terry Ray	TKO	5 (8)	1998-09-04	Sundbyøster Hallen, Copenhagen, Denmark	
Win	42–0	George Linberger	TKO	2 (8)	1998-09-04	Kolding Hallen, Kolding, Denmark	
Win	41–0	Joey Guy	UD	8	1998-02-27	Storebælthallen, Korsør, Denmark	
Win	40–0	Donnell Wingfield	KO	1 (8)	1997-12-05	Aalborg Hallen, Aalborg, Denmark	
Win	39–0	Don Steele	KO	2 (12)	1997-11-14	K.B. Hallen, Copenhagen, Denmark	Retained IBO heavyweight title
Win	38–0	Crawford Grimsley	TKO	6 (8)	1997-10-03	Østre Gasværk, Copenhagen, Denmark	
Win	37–0	Bruce Douglas	KO	1 (8)	1997-09-12	Kolding Hallen, Kolding, Denmark	
Win	36–0	Marcos Gonzales	TKO	4 (8)	1997-07-12	(United States) Caesars Tahoe, Stateline, Nevada, U.S.	
Win	35–0	James Pritchard	KO	3 (8)	1997-06-13	Antvorskovhallen, Slagelse, Denmark	
Win	34–0	Damon Reed	UD	8	1997-05-02	Randers Hallen, Randers, Denmark	
Win	33–0	Pedro Daniel Franco	UD	8	1997-03-14	Odense Idrætshal, Odense, Denmark	
Win	32–0	Larry Holmes	SD	12	1997-01-24	Brøndby Hallen, Brøndby, Denmark	Retained IBO heavyweight title
Win	31–0	Marcus Rhode	TKO	2 (8)	1996-11-30	Nova Arena, Wiener Neustadt, Austria	
Win	30–0	Andrew Maynard	TKO	6 (8)	1996-10-18	Idrættens Hus, Vejle, Denmark	
Win	29–0	Jerry Halstead	KO	2 (8)	1996-09-13	Teater & Kongrescenter, Ringsted, Denmark	
Win	28–0	Mike Hunter	TKO	5 (12)	1996-05-31	K.B. Hallen, Copenhagen, Denmark	Retained IBO heavyweight title
Win	27–0	Salvador Maciel	TKO	3 (8)	1996-04-26	Aalborg Hallen, Aalborg, Denmark	
Win	26–0	Phil Jackson	TKO	6 (12)	1996-03-29	K.B. Hallen, Copenhagen, Denmark	Retained IBO heavyweight title
Win	25–0	Jeff Lally	TKO	2 (8)	1996-02-16	Lillebæltshallen, Middelfart, Denmark	
Win	24–0	Tony LaRosa	TKO	2 (12)	1996-01-12	Falconer Centret, Frederiksberg, Denmark	Won vacant IBO heavyweight title
Win	23–0	Carlos De Leon	TKO	3 (8)	1995-11-24	Randers Hallen, Randers, Denmark	
Win	22–0	Tony Tubbs	TKO	4 (10)	1995-10-20	Cirkusbygningen, Copenhagen, Denmark	
Win	21–0	Terry Davis	UD	8	1995-09-08	Aalborg Hallen, Aalborg, Denmark	
Win	20–0	Jim Huffman	DQ	6 (8)	1995-06-09	Kolding Hallen, Kolding, Denmark	
Win	19–0	Jason Waller	TKO	2 (8)	1995-02-18	Randers Hallen, Randers, Denmark	
Win	18–0	Tim Noble	UD	8	1995-03-17	K.B. Hallen, Copenhagen, Denmark	
Win	17–0	Doug Davis	TKO	6 (8)	1995-03-11	(United States) MGM Grand Arena, Paradise, Nevada, U.S.	
Win	16–0	Matt Green	KO	1 (8)	1995-02-18	(United Kingdom) Bath & West Country Showground, Somerset, England	
Win	15–0	Jeff Lampkin	UD	8	1995-01-13	Aalborg Hallen, Aalborg, Denmark	
Win	14–0	Terry Anderson	KO	5 (8)	1994-11-11	Randers Hallen, Randers, Denmark	
Win	13–0	James Smith	TKO	5 (8)	1994-10-07	K.B. Hallen, Copenhagen, Denmark	
Win	12–0	George Stephens	KO	1 (8)	1994-06-12	Kolding Hallen, Kolding, Denmark	
Win	11–0	Ken Merritt	KO	8 (8)	1994-04-22	Aalborg Hallen, Aalborg, Denmark	
Win	10–0	Ron Gullette	KO	3 (8)	1994-03-25	Aakirkeby Hallerne, Aakirkeby, Denmark	
Win	9–0	Ross Puritty	UD	4	5 Mar 1994	(United States) Olympic Auditorium, Los Angeles, California, U.S.	
Win	8–0	Mike Acey	KO	2 (8)	1994-02-18	Randers Hallen, Randers, Denmark	
Win	7–0	Mike Dixon	UD	8	1993-12-05	Randers Hallen, Randers, Denmark	
Win	6–0	Jean Chanet	UD	6	1993-10-29	Storebælthallen, Korsør, Denmark	
Win	5–0	Roger McKenzie	UD	6	1993-09-17	Cirkusbygningen, Copenhagen, Denmark	
Win	4–0	Jean Weiss	UD	6	1993-06-11	Randers Hallen, Randers, Denmark	
Win	3–0	Carl Gaffney	UD	6	1993-02-12	Randers Hallen, Randers, Denmark	
Win	2–0	Steve Gee	UD	6	1992-11-27	Randers Hallen, Randers, Denmark	
Win	1–0	Terry Armstrong	UD	6	1992-09-04	Parken Stadium, Copenhagen, Denmark	

Sporting positions
Preceded by Jimmy Thunder	IBO heavyweight champion 12 January 1996 – 18 June 1999; Stripped	Succeeded by Lennox Lewis
Vacant Title last held by Michael Grant	IBC heavyweight champion 14 January 2000 – 13 October 2001; Stripped	Succeeded by Tomasz Bonin
