= Jeremy Williams (boxer) =

American boxer

Jeremy Allen Williams
- Born: August 19, 1972 (age 54); Fort Dodge, Iowa, United States
- Other names: Half-Man, Half-Amazing
- Nationality: American
- Height: 6 ft 1 in (185 cm)
- Weight: 205 lb (93 kg; 14.6 st)
- Division: Heavyweight/Cruiserweight (Boxing); Light Heavyweight (MMA)
- Reach: 75 in (191 cm)
- Stance: Orthodox
- Fighting out of: Long Beach, California, United States
- Years active: 1992–2007 (boxing); 2005–2008 (MMA)

Professional boxing record
- Total: 49
- Wins: 43
- By knockout: 35
- Losses: 5
- By knockout: 3
- Draws: 1

Mixed martial arts record
- Total: 5
- Wins: 5
- By knockout: 3
- By submission: 2
- Losses: 0

Other information
- Boxing record from BoxRec
- Mixed martial arts record from Sherdog

Jeremy Williams (born August 19, 1972) is an American former professional boxer and mixed martial artist. He challenged once for the WBO heavyweight title in 1996.

== Amateur career ==
As an amateur, he was the 1989 and 1990 United States amateur Light Heavyweight 1989 heavyweight Jr. Olympic champion and the 1990 and 1991 National Golden Gloves Light Heavyweight champion, and is a member of the Golden Gloves hall of fame. He was a bronze medalist in the 1990 Goodwill Games in the 81 kg division, being knocked out cold with a right cross thrown by the Soviet Andrey Kurnyavka in the quarterfinals after a three-round slugfest (Kurnyavka later told that this was the toughest of his 350 fights.) At the 1991 match-up he was again knocked out cold in the 3rd round via left hook by the Soviet Sergey Klokov. Williams said in an interview to ESPN that the 1990 knockout loss "affected him for years after."

=== Amateur accomplishments ===
- 1990 Blue and Gold National Light Heavyweight Champion
- 1990 USA National Light Heavyweight Champion
- 1991 USA National Light Heavyweight Champion
- 1989 the world record fastest knockout 8 seconds
- California state record fastest Knock out 10 seconds

His amateur record was 168–4. He dropped decisions to Montell Griffin in the Olympic qualifiers 1992.

== Professional boxing career ==
Jeremy Williams is known in the boxing world as one of the most feared knockout artists in the Heavyweight division of his time, with two of his 35 knockouts coming before 30 seconds of the first round—he KO'd Arthur Weathers in 8 seconds on March 19, 1996 (the fastest KO in California boxing history) and KO'd Louis Monaco 28 seconds into their second meeting on March 17, 2002 (Williams had knocked Monaco out in 3 rounds 6 years earlier). Williams won the WBC Continental Americas Heavyweight Title twice.

Williams fought his professional debut at cruiserweight, before moving up to the heavyweight division for the rest of his career.

Williams always seemed to be on the cusp of attaining greatness, but his only challenge was for the WBO World title.

Williams quickly grabbed the attention of the former team that planned the road for Mike Tyson, Bill Cayton and Kevin Rooney. Williams relocated to Catskill, New York. He won his first five fights by KO. While on the rise as a young pro, Williams defeated another undefeated prospect out of Detroit's Kronk Gym, Danell Nicholson. Going into the fight many writers believed that Nicholson (who was managed and trained by Emmanuel Stewert) would pick apart the smaller Williams. Williams ripped Nicholson up in the first round and finished him in the 2nd round. A ferocious puncher who was of mixed blood (Irish & African American; Dempsey Irish & Cherokee) He racked up a record of 15–0 before his first loss, via majority decision to Larry Donald. After the loss, Williams reeled off another streak of knockouts and wound up facing Henry Akinwande for the WBO Heavyweight Title. Williams lost by KO in the 3rd round. Akinwande was much too big for Williams. It would appear, in retrospect, that William's manager and father, Charlie, pushed Jeremy into the heavyweight division too soon and Akinwande capitalized on the much smaller and outclassed Williams. It is thought that this premature push into the heavyweight division (with Williams taking the fight on short notice) resulted in squashing Williams's dreams for ever claiming a heavyweight title. He then began a new streak of KO victories but in fighting for the lightly regarded IBC heavyweight crown Williams lost by TKO to Denmark's Brian Nielsen. There was some controversy surrounding the fight after Williams suffered from food poisoning after dining with the promoter the night before the bout. Some insiders have said that Williams was purposely poisoned. After another streak of knockouts, he again was defeated this time by decision by perennial spoiler Maurice Harris. In 2003, he upset heavyweight prospect Andre Purlette by decision. Williams also competed Cedric Kushner's Thunderbox Heavyweight Tournament, "Fistful of Dollars", but lost on a 3-round decision that doesn't count on his record.

Williams latest run towards a heavyweight title shot ended when he went up against power punching Sam Peter, who ended Williams' night quickly with a vicious KO in the second round. In 2007, Williams re-entered boxing as a cruiserweight and won his first fight by split decision over Gary Gomez.

== Professional boxing record ==
49 fights	43 wins	5 losses
By knockout	35	3
By decision	6	2
By disqualification	2	0
Draws	1	

No.	Result	Record	Opponent	Type	Round, time	Date	Location	Notes
49	Win	43–5–1	(United States) Travis Fulton	DQ	3 (10)	30/03/2013	(United States) Waterloo, Iowa, U.S.	WBU Heavyweight championship
48	Win	42–5–1	(United States) Gary Gomez	SD	8	18/08/2007	(United States) Sandy, Utah, U.S.	
47	Loss	41–5–1	(Nigeria) Samuel Peter	KO	2 (12), 0:27	04/12/2004	(United States) Las Vegas, Nevada, U.S.	For the NABF Heavyweight Title.
46	Win	41–4–1	(Sweden) Attila Levin	TKO	8 (10), 2:48	15/04/2004	(United States) New York City, U.S.	
45	Win	40–4–1	(Guyana) Andre Purlette	UD	10	10/06/2003	(United States) Corpus Christi, Texas, U.S.	
44	Draw	39–4–1	(United States) Al Cole	PTS	10	30/01/2003	(United States) Portland, Oregon, U.S.	
43	Win	39–4	(Mexico) Gilbert Martinez	TKO	9	29/09/2002	(United States) Lemoore, California, U.S.	Referee stopped the bout at 1:00 of the ninth round.
42	Win	38–4	(United States) Ron Guerrero	UD	10	07/06/2002	(United States) Las Vegas, Nevada, U.S.	
41	Win	37–4	(United States) David Bostice	KO	1	21/04/2002	(United States) Laughlin, Nevada, U.S.	Bostice knocked out at 2:59 of the first round.
40	Win	36–4	(United States) Louis Monaco	KO	1	17/03/2002	(United States) Oroville, California, U.S.	Monaco knocked out at 0:29 of the first round.
39	Loss	35–4	(Denmark) Brian Nielsen	TKO	5	28/04/2000	Copenhagen, Denmark	IBC Heavyweight Title.
38	Win	35–3	(United States) Jason Stewart	KO	1	25/03/2000	(United States) Gallatin, Tennessee, U.S.	
37	Loss	34–3	(United States) Maurice Harris	UD	10	19/06/1999	(United States) New York City, U.S.	
36	Win	34–2	(United States) Derrick Roddy	KO	1	30/01/1999	(United States) Atlantic City, New Jersey, U.S.	
35	Win	33–2	(Ukraine) Yuriy Yelistratov	TKO	3	02/10/1998	Wrocław, Poland	
34	Win	32–2	(United States) Domingo Monroe	TKO	1	21/07/1998	(United States) Atlantic City, New Jersey, U.S.	
33	Win	31–2	(United States) Marcus Rhode	TKO	2	30/08/1997	(United States) Las Vegas, Nevada, U.S.	
32	Win	30–2	(United States) Jeff Lally	TKO	1	15/05/1997	(United States) Reseda, California, U.S.	WBO NABO Heavyweight Title. Referee stopped the bout at 2:25 of the first round.
31	Win	29–2	(United States) Phil Jackson	KO	1	25/02/1997	(United States) Long Beach, California, U.S.	Jackson knocked out at 1:25 of the first round.
30	Win	28–2	(United States) Louis Monaco	KO	3	19/12/1996	(United States) Reseda, California, U.S.	
29	Win	27–2	(United States) Jerry Halstead	KO	1	21/11/1996	(United States) Reseda, California, U.S.	
28	Loss	26–2	(United Kingdom) Henry Akinwande	KO	3	29/06/1996	(United States) Indio, California, U.S.	WBO World Heavyweight Title. Williams knocked out at 0:43 of the third round.
27	Win	26–1	(United States) Vincent Boulware	TKO	2	04/06/1996	(United States) Las Vegas, Nevada, U.S.	Referee stopped the bout at 0:33 of the second round.
26	Win	25–1	(United States) Arthur Weathers	TKO	1	19/03/1996	(United States) Long Beach, California, U.S.	Referee stopped the bout at 0:10 of the first round.
25	Win	24–1	(United States) Samson Cohen	TKO	1	09/02/1996	(United States) Las Vegas, Nevada, U.S.	
24	Win	23–1	(United States) David Sewell	TKO	5	29/09/1995	(United States) Stateline, Nevada, U.S.	WBC Continental Americas Heavyweight Title. Referee stopped the bout at 1:21 of the fifth round.
23	Win	22–1	(United States) Quinn Navarre	TKO	2	21/07/1995	(United States) New Orleans, Louisiana, U.S.	WBC Continental Americas Heavyweight Title. Referee stopped the bout at 2:06 of the second round.
22	Win	21–1	(United States) Jesse Ferguson	RTD	7	05/03/1995	(United States) Palm Springs, California, U.S.	Ferguson failed to emerge from his corner for the eighth round.
21	Win	20–1	(Jamaica) Everton Davis	TKO	9	06/01/1995	(United States) Los Angeles, California, U.S.	California Heavyweight Title. Referee stopped the fight at 0:59 of the ninth round after Davis was knocked down thrice in the fight.
20	Win	19–1	(United States) Levi Billups	KO	2	16/11/1994	(United States) Las Vegas, Nevada, U.S.	Billups knocked out at 2:35 of the second round.
19	Win	18–1	(United States) Mark Wills	TKO	6	02/08/1994	(United States) Los Angeles, California, U.S.	Referee stopped the fight at 2:28 of the sixth round.
18	Win	17–1	(United States) Bert Cooper	DQ	7	24/06/1994	(United States) Los Angeles, California, U.S.	Referee disqualified Cooper at 1:48 of the seventh round.
17	Win	16–1	(United States) Andrew Stokes	KO	1	20/05/1994	(United States) Los Angeles, California, U.S.	Stokes knocked out at 0:39 of the first round.
16	Loss	15–1	(United States) Larry Donald	MD	12	12/03/1994	(United States) Las Vegas, Nevada, U.S.	WBC Continental Americas Heavyweight Title.
15	Win	15–0	(United States) Mark Wills	KO	9 (12), 1:37	28/01/1994	(United States) Lewiston, Maine, U.S.	WBC Continental Americas Heavyweight Title.
14	Win	14–0	(United States) Garing Lane	TKO	12 (12), 0:18	07/12/1993	(United States) Auburn Hills, Michigan, U.S.	WBC Continental Americas Heavyweight Title.
13	Win	13–0	(United States) Nathaniel Fitch	RTD	7 (10), 3:00	09/11/1993	(United States) Fargo, North Dakota, U.S.	Fitch failed to come out of his corner for the eighth round.
12	Win	12–0	(United States) Mark Young	KO	6 (10), 2:31	02/10/1993	(United States) Atlantic City, New Jersey, U.S.	
11	Win	11–0	(United States) Doug Davis	KO	1 (10)	14/09/1993	(United States) Atlantic City, New Jersey, U.S.	
10	Win	10–0	(United States) Frankie Swindell	UD	10	29/07/1993	(United States) Bushkill, Pennsylvania, U.S.	
9	Win	9–0	(United States) Danell Nicholson	KO	2 (6), 2:56	08/05/1993	(United States) Stateline, Nevada, U.S.	
8	Win	8–0	(United States) Marion Wilson	UD	8	25/03/1993	(United States) Atlantic City, New Jersey, U.S.	Williams was knocked down once and Wilson was docked a point for holding.
7	Win	7–0	(United States) Mike Robinson	TKO	2	02/03/1993	(United States) Mashantucket, Connecticut, U.S.	
6	Win	6–0	(United States) Robert Smith	SD	6	21/02/1993	(United States) Philadelphia, Pennsylvania, U.S.	
5	Win	5–0	(United States) Sinclair Babb	KO	2 (4), 0:35	23/12/1992	(United States) White Plains, New York, U.S.	
4	Win	4–0	(United States) Willie Johnson	KO	1 (4)	05/12/1992	(United States) Atlantic City, New Jersey, U.S.	
3	Win	3–0	(United States) David Payne	KO	1 (4), 1:25	18/11/1992	(United States) Troy, New York, U.S.	
2	Win	2–0	(United States) Hassan Shabazz	TKO	1 (4)	03/11/1992	(United States) Mashantucket, Connecticut, U.S.	Shabazz was knocked down thrice in the round initiating the three knockdown rule.
1	Win	1–0	(United States) Jerry Arentzen	TKO	2 (4)	14/10/1992	(United States) Atlantic City, New Jersey, U.S.	

== Television and film career ==
In 2005, he assisted the reality TV show The Contender as a trainer for the West Coast Team. In 2006, he again appeared on the show, The Contender season 2, as a trainer. Williams also starred in the film Carman: The Champion. He is also the bully trainer on the MTV reality show, Bully Beatdown.

== Mixed martial arts career ==
In 2005, he made his MMA debut at WFC: Rumble at the Ramada, defeating Josh Tamsen via TKO in the first round. He has since gone 5–0 with his latest win coming via way of TKO over Auggie Padeken on March 15, 2008.

== Mixed martial arts record ==
Professional record breakdown
5 matches	5 wins	0 losses
By knockout	3	0
By submission	2	0

Res.	Record	Opponent	Method	Event	Date	Round	Time	Location	Notes
Win	5–0	(United States) Auggie Padeken	TKO (punches)	Icon Sport-Baroni vs Hose	March 15, 2008	1	2:18	Honolulu, Hawaii, United States	
Win	4–0	(United States) Charles Jones	TKO (exhaustion)	Icon Sport-Epic	March 31, 2007	3	1:22	Honolulu, Hawaii, United States	
Win	3–0	(United States) Derek Thornton	Submission (guillotine choke)	Icon Sport-All In	February 9, 2007	1	3:48	Honolulu, Hawaii, United States	
Win	2–0	(United States) Ron Fields	Submission (punches)	Icon Sport-Mayhem vs Trigg	December 2, 2006	2	0:37	Honolulu, Hawaii, United States	
Win	1–0	(Mexico) Josh Tamsen	TKO	WFC-Rumble at the Ramada	December 8, 2005	1	0:00	Norwalk, California, United States	
