= Mashantucket, Connecticut =

Census-designated place in Connecticut, United States

- Census-designated place
- Location within Connecticut Location within the United States
- Coordinates: 41°27′45″N 71°58′38″W
- Country: United States
- State: Connecticut
- County: New London
- Town: Ledyard

Area
  - Total: 2.55 sq mi (6.61 km^{2})
  - Land: 2.55 sq mi (6.61 km^{2})
  - Water: 0 sq mi (0.0 km^{2})
- Elevation: 140 ft (43 m)

Population (2020)
  - Total: 457
  - Density: 117/sq mi (45.2/km^{2})
- Time zone: UTC-5 (Eastern (EST))
  - Summer (DST): UTC-4 (EDT)
- ZIP Code: 06338 (Mashantucket)
- Area codes: 860/959
- FIPS code: 09-15840
- GNIS feature ID: 2633319

Mashantucket is a census-designated place (CDP) in the northeastern part of the town of Ledyard, New London County, Connecticut, United States. It consists of land held by the Mashantucket Pequot Tribe. The Foxwoods Resort Casino is in the northeast part of the CDP, along Connecticut Route 2. As of the 2020 census, Mashantucket had a population of 457.

== Education ==
The CDP, along with the rest of Ledyard Town, is in the Ledyard School District.
