= Vassiliy Jirov vs. James Toney =

Boxing match

- Date: April 26, 2003
- Venue: Foxwoods Resort Casino, Ledyard, Connecticut, U.S.
- Title(s) on the line: IBF Cruiserweight title

Tale of the tape
| Boxer | Vassiliy Jirov | James Toney |
| Nickname | The Tiger | Lights Out |
| Hometown | Balkhash, Karaganda, Kazakhstan | Grand Rapids, Michigan, U.S. |
| Pre-fight record | 31–0 (27 KO) | 65–4–2 (42 KO) |
| Age | 29 years | 34 years, 8 months |
| Height | 6 ft 2 in (188 cm) | 5 ft 9 in (175 cm) |
| Weight | 188 lb (85 kg) | 190 lb (86 kg) |
| Style | Southpaw | Orthodox |
| Recognition | IBF; Cruiserweight champion The Ring; No. 1 Ranked Cruiserweight | IBF; No. 1 Ranked Cruiserweight; The Ring; No. 4 Ranked Cruiserweight; 2-division world champion |

Result
- Toney wins via unanimous decision (117–109, 117–109, 116–110)

Vassiliy Jirov vs. James Toney was a professional boxing match contested on April 26, 2003, for the IBF cruiserweight title.

== Background ==
A fight between reigning IBF cruiserweight champion Vassiliy Jirov and former 2-division champion James Toney had been in the works for nearly two years. Jirov and Toney had a tentative agreement to face each other on September 8, 2001.

Jirov, despite being a former Olympic gold medalist (having beaten the co featured Antonio Tarver in the semi final) and in the midst of a 2-year reign as cruiserweight champion, had yet to headline a boxing card and was hoping a fight with Toney, once one of boxings biggest stars, would give him the chance to do so. He had however appeared in the first cruiserweight title bout to be broadcast on HBO, when he won the title against Arthur Williams. However, a deal did not get done and Jirov's next defense turned out to be against 34-year old Jorge Castro, the IBF's number-one ranked cruiserweight contender and Jirov's mandatory challenger. After his defeat of Castro, Jirov hoped to either meet Roy Jones Jr., the then-undisputed light heavyweight champion or Toney, who was in attendance for the Jirov–Castro fight.

Toney would fight Jason Robinson in an IBF title eliminator bout, earning the victory via seventh-round knockout, making him the number-one contender to Jirov's title and officially setting in motion his first major title fight since his 1994 loss to Roy Jones Jr.

The Jirov–Toney fight was originally set for November 2002, but a long and acrimonious split with his longtime manager, Ivalyo Gotzev, caused a 14-month layoff for Jirov and the fight was pushed back to April 26, 2003.

== The fights ==
=== Undercard ===
The untelevised card saw wins for Sechew Powell, Duncan Dokiwari and Yuri Foreman.

=== Tarver vs. Griffin ===
Antonio Tarver vs. Montell Griffin
- Title(s) on the line: vacant WBC and IBF light heavyweight title

Tale of the tape
| Boxer | Antonio Tarver | Montell Griffin |
| Nickname | "The Magic Man" | "Ice" |
| Hometown | Orlando, Florida, U.S. | Chicago, Illinois, U.S. |
| Pre-fight record | 21–1 (17 KO) | 44–3 (29 KO) |
| Age | 34 years, 5 months | 32 years, 10 months |
| Height | 6 ft 2 in (188 cm) | 5 ft 7 in (170 cm) |
| Weight | 175 lb (79 kg) | 175 lb (79 kg) |
| Style | Southpaw | Orthodox |
| Recognition | WBC/IBF/The Ring; No. 1 Ranked Light Heavyweight | WBC/IBF; No. 2 Ranked Light Heavyweight; The Ring; No. 4 Ranked Light Heavyweight; Former Light heavyweight champion |

Result
- Tarver defeats Griffin by unanimous decision

The co featured bout saw top ranked contender Antonio Tarver face No. 2 ranked and former light heavyweight champion Montell Griffin. The WBC and IBF light heavyweight belt vacated by Roy Jones Jr. were on the line.

Tarver entered the bout having avenged the only loss on his record in his previous bout, stopping former world title challenger Eric Harding in 5 rounds.

Griffin had gone 17–2 since he lost his world title in a first-round knockout at the hands of Jones in August 1997, having lost a split decision to Harding and been stopped by Lineal champion Dariusz Michalczewski.

==== The fight ====
After both men spent the first round feeling each other out, Tarver landed a left hand to the back of the head followed by a straight left that dropped Griffin with seconds left in the round. Griffin had his moments but Tarver largely controlled the bout with his left hand and jab. In the 7th round, Griffin was cut on the right eye by a left hand, prompting referee Mike Ortega to have the ringside physician check multiple times that Griffin could continue. As the fight ticked toward the end Tarver landed a left to the chin that sent Griffin down for the second time, he beat the count and seconds later the final bell sounded.

When the scorecards were read all three judges scored the bout a 120–106 shutout for Tarver, making his the new unified light heavyweight champion.

HBO's unofficial ringside scorer Harold Lederman scored the fight 120–106 for Tarver.

According CompuBox statistics Tarver landed 187 of 677 punches thrown (a 27.6% connect rate) while Griffin landed 82 of 338 (a 24.3% connect rate)

==== Aftermath ====
Speaking after the fight, Tarver said "I never thought I'd be here, but here I am, light heavyweight champion of the world. I've put in a lot of hard work to get where I am." When asked about a potential bout with Lineal champion Dariusz Michalczewski, Tarver dismissed it saying "probably not, because of how things work over there, and I'm not about to jeopardize my career because of that."

| Preceded by vs. Eric Harding II | Antonio Tarver's bouts 26 April 2003 | Succeeded by vs. Roy Jones Jr. |
| Preceded by vs. George Khalid Jones | Montell Griffin's bouts 26 April 2003 | Succeeded by vs. Willard Lewis |

=== Main Event ===
In a hardfought bout in which a combined 1,843 punches were thrown, Toney would earn a unanimous decision victory with rather comfortable scores of 117–109 (twice) and 116–110. Jirov served as the aggressor and pressed the action most of the fight, throwing 1,032 punches, but only landing 24% of them (243) as Toney defended and counter-punched effectively and landed over 100 more punches than Jirov, scoring 380 of his 811 thrown punches. Toney would score the fight's lone knockdown in the 12th and final round. Jirov and Toney exchange punches back-and-forth for the entire duration of the round with both fighter taking damage, then with 20 seconds remaining Toney scored a six-punch combination that sent Jirov down to the canvas. With only five seconds remaining, Jirov answered referee Steve Smoger's 10-count and the fight continued, though the bell rang to end the fight just as the fighters engaged again.

HBO's unofficial ringside scorer Harold Lederman, who had Jirov winning going into the 12th round, scored the fight even 113–113.

== Fight card ==
Confirmed bouts:

| Weight Class | Weight | | vs. | | Method | Round | Notes |
|---|---|---|---|---|---|---|---|
| Cruiserweight | 190 lbs. | James Toney | def. | Vassiliy Jirov (c) | UD | 12/12 | ^{note 1} |
| Light Heavyweight | 175 lbs. | Antonio Tarver | def. | Montell Griffin | UD | 12/12 | ^{note 2} |
| Heavyweight | 190+ lbs. | Duncan Dokiwari | def. | Carlton Johnson | TKO | 3/8 |
| Middleweight | 160 lbs. | Yuri Foreman | def. | Charles Clark | TKO | 2/8 |
| Middleweight | 160 lbs. | Sechew Powell | def. | Jamal Harris | UD | 6/6 |
| Cruiserweight | 190 lbs. | Aneudi Santos | def. | Dan Sheehan | TKO | 5/6 |

^Note 1 For IBF Cruiserweight title
^Note 2 For vacant WBC and IBF Light Heavyweight titles

== Broadcasting ==
| Country | Broadcaster |
|---|---|
| United States | HBO |

| Preceded by vs. Jorge Castro | Vassiliy Jirov's bouts 26 April 2003 | Succeeded by vs. Ernest Mateen |
| Preceded by vs. Jason Robinson | James Toney's bouts 26 April 2003 | Succeeded by vs. Evander Holyfield |
Awards
| Preceded by Arturo Gatti vs. Micky Ward | Harry Markson Award; 2003 | Succeeded by Erik Morales vs. Marco Antonio Barrera III |
