= List of United States national amateur boxing light heavyweight champions =

Below is a list of National Amateur Boxing Light Heavyweight Champions, also known as United States Amateur Champions, along with the state or region which they represented. The United States National Boxing Championships bestow the title of United States Amateur Champion on amateur boxers for winning the annual national amateur boxing tournament organized by USA Boxing, the national governing body for Olympic boxing and is the United States' member organization of the International Amateur Boxing Association (AIBA). It is one of four premier amateur boxing tournaments, the other being the National Golden Gloves Tournament, which crowns its own amateur light heavyweight champion, the Police Athletic League Tournament, and the United States Armed Forces Tournament, all sending champions to the US Olympic Trials. It is contested at a 178 lb limit.

== List ==
- 1913 – Joe Brown, Pawtucket, RI
- 1914 – W. Hanna, Toronto, ON, Canada
- 1915 – Edward Carr, Boston, MA
- 1916 – Patrick McCarthy, Roxbury, MA
- 1917 – Ted Jamieson, Milwaukee, WI
- 1918 – John McMinimen, Camp Devens, MA
- 1919 – Al Roche, Somerville, MA
- 1920 – J. Burke, Pittsburgh, PA
- 1921 – Mangu Larsen, New York, NY
- 1922 – Charles McKenna, New York, NY
- 1923 – Henry Fay, Pittsburgh, PA
- 1924 – Tom Kirby, Boston, MA
- 1925 – Henry Lamar, Washington, DC
- 1926 – Henry Lamar, Washington, DC
- 1927 – George Hoffman, New York, NY
- 1928 – Leon Lucas, Philadelphia, PA
- 1929 – Martin Levandowski, Grand Rapids, MI
- 1930 – Frank Tucker, San Francisco, CA
- 1931 – Tony Poloni, Reno, NV
- 1932 – Homer Brandeis, San Francisco, CA
- 1933 – Max Marke, Chicago, IL
- 1934 – Joe Louis, Detroit, MI
- 1935 – Joseph Bauer, Cleveland, OH
- 1936 – John Lasinski, New York, NY
- 1937 – Tim Hill, Detroit, MI
- 1938 – William Muldune, Cleveland, OH
- 1939 – Jimmy Reeves, Cleveland, OH
- 1940 – Vic Hutton, Farmersburg, IN
- 1941 – Shelton Bell, Wilberforce, OH
- 1942 – Bob Foxworth, St. Louis, MO
- 1943 – Bob Foxworth, St. Louis, MO
- 1944 – Ray Stadifer, Cleveland, OH
- 1945 – Richard Nutt, Alexandria, VA
- 1946 – Bob Foxworth, St. Louis, MO
- 1947 – Grant Butcher, San Francisco, CA
- 1948 – Grant Butcher, San Francisco, CA
- 1949 – Delopez Oliver, Honolulu, HI
- 1950 – Eldridge Thompson, Washington, DC
- 1951 – John Boutillier, Boston, MA
- 1952 – Eldridge Thompson, Washington, DC
- 1953 – Frank Perry, Lockland, OH
- 1954 – Warnell Lester, Baltimore, MD
- 1955 – John Horne, Washington, DC
- 1956 – John Horne, Omaha, NE
- 1957 – (Ignaz) Lindy Lindmoser, Vancouver, BC, Canada
- 1958 – Sylvester Banks, St. Louis, MO
- 1959 – Cassius Clay, Louisville, KY
- 1960 – Cassius Clay, Louisville, KY
- 1961 – Bob Christopherson, University of Wisconsin
- 1962 – Billy Joiner, Cincinnati, OH
- 1963 – Fred Lewis, US Air Force
- 1964 – Bob Christopherson, US Air Force
- 1965 – Roger Russell, Philadelphia, PA
- 1966 – John Griffin, Cleveland, OH
- 1967 – John Griffin, Cleveland, OH
- 1968 – Len Hutchins, Detroit, MI
- 1969 – Dave Matthews, Cleveland, OH
- 1970 – Nathaniel Jackson, Memphis, TN
- 1971 – Marvin Johnson, Indianapolis, IN
- 1972 – Hernando Molyneauz. New York, NY
- 1973 – D.C. Barker, Denver, CO
- 1974 – Leon Spinks, US Marines
- 1975 – Leon Spinks, US Marines
- 1976 – Leon Spinks, US Marines
- 1977 – Larry Strogen, Shert, LA
- 1978 – Elmer Martin, US Navy
- 1979 – Tony Tucker, Grand Rapids, MI
- 1980 – Jeff Lampkin
- 1981 – Alex DeLucia, Portland, OR
- 1982 – Bennie Heard, Augusta, GA
- 1983 – Ricky Womack, Detroit, MI
- 1984 – Loren Ross, US Army
- 1985 – Loren Ross, US Army
- 1986 – Loren Ross, US Army
- 1987 – Andrew Maynard, US Army
- 1988 – Andrew Maynard, US Army
- 1989 – Jeremy Williams, Long Beach, CA
- 1990 – Jeremy Williams, Long Beach, CA
- 1991 – Terry McGroom, Chicago, IL
- 1992 – Montell Griffin, Chicago, IL
- 1993 – Antonio Tarver, Orlando, FL
- 1994 – Benjamin McDowell, Fort Bragg, NC
- 1995 – Antonio Tarver, Orlando, FL
- 1996 – Anthony Stewart, Chicago, IL
- 1997 – Anthony Stewart, Chicago, IL
- 1998 – Olanda Anderson, Fort Carson, CO
- 1999 – Michael Simms Jr., Sacramento, CA
- 2000 – Olanda Anderson, Fort Carson, CO
- 2001 – DeAndrey Abron, Fort Carson, CO
- 2002 – Curtis Stevens, Brooklyn, NY
- 2003 – Andre Ward, Oakland, CA
- 2004 – Marcus “Marker” Johnson, Killeen, TX
- 2005 – William Rosinsky, Queens, NY
- 2006 – James Brumley, Manchester, KY
- 2007 – Christopher Downs, Fort Carson, CO
- 2008 – Dorian Anthony, Lynwood, CA
- 2009 – Robert Brant, Oakdale, MN
- 2010 – Jeffery Spencer, Fountain, CO
- 2011 – Jesse Hart, Philadelphia, PA
- 2012 – Marcus Brown, Staten Island, NY
- 2015 – Heniel Alfonso Luciano, Brooklyn, New York
- 2016 - Devonte “Bully” Campbell, Manhattan, New York
