= Montell Griffin =

American boxer (born 1970)

Personal information
- Nickname: Ice
- Nationality: American
- Born: Montell Julian Griffin; June 6, 1970 (age 56) Chicago, Illinois, U.S.
- Height: 5 ft 7 in (170 cm)
- Weight: Light heavyweight

Boxing career
- Reach: 70 in (178 cm)
- Stance: Orthodox

Boxing record
- Total fights: 59
- Wins: 50
- Win by KO: 30
- Losses: 8
- Draws: 1

Montell Julian Griffin (born June 6, 1970) is an American former professional boxer who competed from 1993 to 2011. He held the World Boxing Council (WBC) light heavyweight title in 1997. At regional level, he held multiple light heavyweight championships, including the NABF title twice between 1996 and 2003; and the USBA title from 2006 to 2007.

== Early life ==
Montell Griffin was born June 6, 1970, in Chicago. By age 22, Griffin was living in Midway City, California and defeated Frank Vassar of Spokane, Washington in the 1992 U.S. Amateur Boxing Championships. He defeated future heavyweight contender Jeremy Williams at the box-offs, to make the 1992 Olympic team.

== Amateur career ==
Griffin compiled an amateur record of 36-5. He won the 1992 United States Amateur Light Heavyweight title.

At the 1992 Olympic Trials in Worcester, Massachusetts, Griffin was outpointed in the final by Jeremy Williams. However, at the Olympic Box-offs he outpointed Williams twice, to earn an Olympic bid at light-heavyweight. His Olympic results were:

- France Mabiletsa (Botswana) won on points
- Yo-Da Ko (South Korea) won on points
- Torsten May (Germany) lost through controversial scoring of points whereby some of his points were credited to May

== Professional career ==
Griffin, nicknamed "Ice," began his pro career in 1993. He rose to prominence when he defeated James Toney twice by controversial decisions in 1995 and 1996. The second victory over Toney earned Griffin a lucrative bout against WBC champion Roy Jones Jr.

=== Griffin vs. Jones Jr. ===
After his 1996 win over Toney, Griffin landed a shot at WBC light-heavyweight title holder Roy Jones Jr. Griffin handed Jones his first professional defeat via a disqualification. A frustrated Jones dropped Griffin with a series of hard and fast, head and body punches in round nine, and then hit him again twice on the head after Griffin had taken a knee on the canvas, leading to Jones's disqualification. They had an immediate rematch, and on August 21, Jones regained the WBC title by knocking out Griffin in the first round.

=== Rebuilding ===
After the loss to Jones, Griffin remained a top-ranked light-heavyweight for six years. He won 11 of his next 12 bouts, losing only a controversial split decision to undefeated but unknown southpaw Eric Harding, despite knocking him down and out-landing him according to punchstats.

=== Griffin vs. Michalczewski ===
Four consecutive knockout wins later, the now 38-2 Griffin squared off against 40-0 Lineal/WBO champion, Dariusz Michalczewski in Germany. The 29-year-old Griffin won the first three rounds on the cards but was cut by the 31-year-old Michalczewski's jab in the second round. In the fourth, Griffin was twice staggered, and took 14 unanswered shots to the head and gloves, which forced referee Joe Cortez to stop the bout.

=== Griffin vs. Tarver ===
After defeating Derrick Harmon and George Khalid Jones by unanimous decisions, Griffin earned a shot at the vacant WBC/IBF titles against Antonio Tarver in 2003, losing a wide decision.

=== Later career ===
Now in his mid-thirties, a faded Griffin would go on to lose to Rico Hoye by split decision, Julio César González when the bout was stopped in the early goings on a technicality and sent to the scorecards, and Glen Johnson by TKO 11; all three were IBF eliminators. He also lost on points to Beibut Shumenov

Griffin compiled a respectable resume over the course of his career: he has two wins over James Toney, a disqualification win over Roy Jones Jr., and wins over contenders Ka-Dy King, Ray Lathon, Randall Yonker, Derrick Harmon and George Khalid Jones.

== Professional boxing record ==
59 fights	50 wins	8 losses
By knockout	30	3
By decision	19	5
By disqualification	1	0
Draws	1	

No.	Result	Record	Opponent	Type	Round, time	Date	Location	Notes
59	Win	50–8–1	DeAndrey Abron	UD	8	Aug 19, 2011	Horseshoe, Hammond, Indiana, U.S.	
58	Draw	49–8–1	Ross Thompson	SD	10	May 29, 2010	Horseshoe, Hammond, Indiana, U.S.	
57	Loss	49–8	Beibut Shumenov	UD	12	Aug 2, 2008	Stadium Khadjimukan, Shymkent, Kazakhstan	For vacant WBC–ABCO and WBO Asia Pacific light heavyweight titles
56	Win	49–7	Cory Cummings	UD	10	Jun 20, 2008	Aragon Ballroom, Chicago, Illinois, U.S.	
55	Loss	48–7	Glen Johnson	TKO	11 (12), 2:38	May 16, 2007	Hard Rock Live, Hollywood, Florida, U.S.	
54	Win	48–6	Norman Jones	UD	12	Mar 31, 2006	Mohegan Sun Arena, Montville, Connecticut, U.S.	Won vacant USBA light heavyweight title
53	Loss	47–6	Julio César González	TD	6 (12), 1:11	May 5, 2005	Spa Resort Casino, Palm Springs, California, U.S.	Majority TD after González was cut from an accidental head clash
52	Win	47–5	Sam Reese	UD	10	Feb 3, 2005	HP Pavilion, San Jose, California, U.S.	
51	Loss	46–5	Rico Hoye	SD	12	Sep 16, 2004	Kewadin Casino, Sault Ste. Marie, Michigan, U.S.	Won IBA Continental light heavyweight title
50	Win	46–4	Thomas Reid	UD	10	Jun 17, 2004	Harrah's, Laughlin, Nevada, U.S.	
49	Win	45–4	Willard Lewis	RTD	4 (10), 3:00	May 22, 2004	Warnors Theatre, Fresno, California, U.S.	
48	Loss	44–4	Antonio Tarver	UD	12	Apr 26, 2003	Foxwoods Resort Casino, Ledyard, Connecticut, U.S.	For vacant WBC and IBF light heavyweight titles
47	Win	44–3	George Khalid Jones	UD	12	Nov 3, 2002	Table Mountain Rancheria, Friant, California, U.S.	Won vacant WBC Continental Americas and NABF light heavyweight titles
46	Win	43–3	Derrick Harmon	UD	12	Jul 21, 2002	Table Mountain Casino, Friant, California, U.S.	Won WBC Continental Americas light heavyweight title
45	Win	42–3	George Klinesmith	TKO	1 (10), 1:29	Feb 17, 2002	Stardust Resort and Casino, Winchester, Nevada, U.S.	
44	Win	41–3	Jesus Ruiz	TD	10 (10)	May 12, 2001	Palace Indian Gaming Center, Lemoore, California, U.S.	Split TD after an accidental head clash
43	Win	40–3	Ed Dalton	TKO	6 (12), 2:16	Mar 9, 2001	Hilton, Reno, Nevada, U.S.	Won vacant WBC Continental Americas light heavyweight title
42	Win	39–3	Jose Luis Rivera	UD	12	Apr 22, 2000	Tianhe Stadium, Guangzhou, China	Won vacant IBC light heavyweight title
41	Loss	38–3	Dariusz Michalczewski	TKO	4 (12), 2:59	Aug 28, 1999	Stadthalle, Bremen, Germany	For WBO light heavyweight title
40	Win	38–2	Tim Cooper	TKO	3 (10), 2:25	Jun 23, 1999	Ramada Inn, Rosemont, Illinois, U.S.	
39	Win	37–2	Danny Thomas	TKO	5 (10), 1:39	May 25, 1999	50 Yard Line Bar and Grille, Harvey, Illinois, U.S.	
38	Win	36–2	Randall Yonker	KO	3 (10)	Feb 26, 1999	Sho-Ka-Wah Casino, Hopland, California, U.S.	
37	Win	35–2	Availeo Slate	TKO	2 (10), 1:53	Jan 26, 1999	50 Yard Line Bar and Grille, Harvey, Illinois, U.S.	
36	Loss	34–2	Eric Harding	SD	12	Nov 13, 1998	Miccosukee Resort & Gaming, Miami, Florida, U.S.	For vacant NABF light heavyweight title
35	Win	34–1	Eric Davis	TKO	6 (10), 1:10	Oct 2, 1998	Expo Center, Dolton, Illinois, U.S.	
34	Win	33–1	Randall Yonker	TKO	3 (10), 1:20	Aug 22, 1998	Horizon, Rosemont, Illinois, U.S.	
33	Win	32–1	Karl Willis	TKO	3 (10), 2:59	Jun 3, 1998	Coeur d'Alene Casino Resort Hotel, Worley, Idaho, U.S.	
32	Win	31–1	Kenny Lopez	TKO	9 (10)	Mar 28, 1998	Boardwalk Hall, Atlantic City, New Jersey, U.S.	
31	Win	30–1	Thomas Reid	UD	10	Feb 27, 1998	The Orleans, Paradise, Nevada, U.S.	
30	Win	29–1	Jesus Castaneda	TKO	8 (10), 2:48	Dec 26, 1997	The Orleans, Paradise, Nevada, U.S.	
29	Win	28–1	Vinson Durham	UD	10	Nov 29, 1997	The Orleans, Paradise, Nevada, U.S.	
28	Loss	27–1	Roy Jones Jr.	KO	1 (12), 2:31	Aug 7, 1997	Foxwoods Resort Casino, Ledyard, Connecticut, U.S.	Lost WBC light heavyweight title
27	Win	27–0	Roy Jones Jr.	DQ	9 (12), 2:27	Mar 21, 1997	Etess Arena, Atlantic City, New Jersey, U.S.	Won WBC light heavyweight title; Jones Jr. disqualified for hitting Griffin after a knockdown
26	Win	26–0	James Toney	UD	12	Dec 6, 1996	Lawlor Events Center, Reno, Nevada, U.S.	Won WBU light heavyweight title
25	Win	25–0	Russell Mitchell	TKO	1 (10), 2:08	Oct 18, 1996	Expo Center, Dolton, Illinois, U.S.	
24	Win	24–0	Melvin Wynn	TKO	2 (10)	Aug 28, 1996	Coeur d'Alene Casino Resort Hotel, Worley, Idaho, U.S.	
23	Win	23–0	Matthew Charleston	TKO	11 (12), 2:14	Jul 11, 1996	Madison Square Garden, New York City, New York, U.S.	Won vacant NABF light heavyweight title
22	Win	22–0	Charles Scott	TKO	4 (10)	May 10, 1996	Madison Square Garden, New York City, New York, U.S.	
21	Win	21–0	Tony Golden	KO	2 (10), 1:40	Mar 29, 1996	Expo Center, Dolton, Illinois, U.S.	
20	Win	20–0	William Clayton	KO	1 (10), 1:31	Jan 26, 1996	Expo Center, Dolton, Illinois, U.S.	
19	Win	19–0	Ray Webb	TKO	6 (10)	Nov 29, 1995	Elephant and Castle Shopping Centre, London, England	
18	Win	18–0	John Mitchell	TKO	2 (10)	Oct 7, 1995	Convention Hall, Atlantic City, New Jersey, U.S.	
17	Win	17–0	Hunter Clay	KO	6	Sep 14, 1995	Battersea Town Hall, London, England	
16	Win	16–0	Tony Booth	TKO	2 (10)	Jun 4, 1995	York Hall, London, England	
15	Win	15–0	James Toney	MD	12	Feb 18, 1995	MGM Grand Garden Arena, Paradise, Nevada, U.S.	Won vacant IBF Inter-Continental light heavyweight title
14	Win	14–0	Ray Lathon	UD	12	Sep 12, 1994	Great Western Forum, Inglewood, California, U.S.	
13	Win	13–0	David Vedder	UD	10	May 23, 1994	Great Western Forum, Inglewood, California, U.S.	
12	Win	12–0	Terry Collier	TKO	6	Apr 26, 1994	Louisville, Kentucky, U.S.	
11	Win	11–0	Steve Brewer	TKO	2	Jan 18, 1994	Civic Auditorium, Omaha, Nebraska, U.S.	
10	Win	10–0	Terrence Wright	TKO	6 (8)	Dec 6, 1993	Horizon, Rosemont, Illinois, U.S.	
9	Win	9–0	Terry Collier	PTS	8	Nov 19, 1993	Union Hall, Countryside, Illinois, U.S.	
8	Win	8–0	Bobby Mack	PTS	6	Sep 24, 1993	National Basketball Arena, Dublin, Ireland	
7	Win	7–0	Ka-Dy King	UD	6	Aug 27, 1993	Beverly Wilshire Hotel, Los Angeles, California, U.S.	
6	Win	6–0	Mike Garcia	TKO	3 (6)	Aug 13, 1993	Memorial Coliseum, Corpus Christi, Texas, U.S.	
5	Win	5–0	Ron Stringer	TKO	3	Jun 25, 1993	Union Hall, Countryside, Illinois, U.S.	
4	Win	4–0	Donnie Penelton	UD	6	Apr 26, 1993	Rosemont, Illinois, U.S.	
3	Win	3–0	Randy McGaugh	KO	2	Apr 16, 1993	Lansing, Michigan, U.S.	
2	Win	2–0	Calvin Puckett	TKO	2 (6)	Mar 13, 1993	High School, Aurora, Illinois, U.S.	
1	Win	1–0	Jose Luis Ornelas	TKO	2	Feb 16, 1993	McNichols Sports Arena, Denver, Colorado, U.S.	

== Hall of Fame ==
With a record of 50-8 during his historic boxing career, Montell “Ice” Griffin was inducted into the Rochester Boxing Hall of Fame Class of ‘22 in October 2022, in Rochester, New York.

Sporting positions
Amateur boxing titles
Previous: Terry McGroom	U.S. light heavyweight champion 1991	Next: Antonio Tarver
Regional boxing titles
Vacant Title last held by Dariusz Michalczewski	IBF Inter-Continental light heavyweight champion February 18, 1995 – July 1996; Vacated	Vacant Title next held by Billy Lewis
Vacant Title last held by Merqui Sosa	NABF light heavyweight champion July 11, 1996 – December 1996; Vacated	Vacant Title next held by Michael Nunn
Vacant Title last held by Derrick Harmon	WBC Continental Americas light heavyweight champion March 9, 2001 – May 2001; Vacated	Vacant Title next held by Arturo Rivera
Preceded by Derrick Harmon	WBC Continental Americas light heavyweight champion July 21, 2002 – October 2002; Vacated	Vacant Title next held by Arturo Rivera
Vacant Title last held by Arturo Rivera	WBC Continental Americas light heavyweight champion November 3, 2002 – April 26, 2003; Lost bid for world title	Vacant Title next held by Donnell Wiggins
Vacant Title last held by Antonio Tarver	NABF light heavyweight champion November 3, 2002 – April 2003; Vacated	Vacant Title next held by Donnell Wiggins
Vacant Title last held by George Khalid Jones	USBA light heavyweight champion March 31, 2006 – May 16, 2007; Lost eliminator for IBF title	Vacant Title next held by Tavoris Cloud
Minor world boxing titles
Preceded by James Toney	WBU light heavyweight champion December 6, 1996 – March 1997; Vacated	Vacant Title next held by Frank Tate
Vacant Title last held by Salvatore Di Salvatore	IBC light heavyweight champion April 22, 2000 – March 2001; Vacated	Vacant Title next held by Etienne Whitaker
Major world boxing titles
Preceded by Roy Jones Jr.	WBC light heavyweight champion Mar 21, 1997 – August 7, 1997	Succeeded by Roy Jones Jr.
