= Jerry Odom =

Jerry Odom may refer to:

- Jerry Odom (American football) (born 1968), American football coach
- Jerry Odom (boxer) (living), American boxer
