= Barry Jordan =

American neurologist

Barry Jordan is an American neurologist. He currently serves as the assistant medical director at Burke Rehabilitation Hospital in White Plains, N.Y. He is also the director of neurorehabilitation and director of the Memory Evaluation Treatment Service at Burke. Jordan is a board certified neurologist specializing in sports neurology, Alzheimer's disease, and traumatic brain injury. Jordan has been at Burke Rehabilitation Hospital since 1999.

== Training ==
Jordan received his bachelor of arts degree from the University of Pennsylvania in neurophysiology in 1977. He obtained his medical degree, with a concentration in sports medicine, from Harvard Medical School in 1981. In 1997, he received his Masters in Public Health, with a concentration in general public health, from the Columbia University School of Public Health.

Jordan completed an internship at UCLA Medical Center in Los Angeles in 1982. He did his residency at New York Hospital-Cornell Medical Center and finished in 1985. He served as a clinical fellow at Memorial Sloan-Kettering Cancer Center in 1986. He was a fellow at Cornell University Medical College and the Hospital for Special Surgery in New York City as well as a fellow at Reed Neurological Research Center at the UCLA School of Medicine.

== Sports neurology ==
Jordan joined the team at Burke Rehabilitation Hospital in 1999, first as an attending neurologist and then as the director of the Brain Injury Program. He was appointed Director of the Memory Evaluation and Treatment Services, which helps diagnose and treat memory-related issues in 2002. In 2013, he was appointed the Assistant Medical Director of the hospital and in June 2014 became the director of neurorehabilitation. He has served as an Associate Professor of Clinical Neurology at Weill Medical College of Cornell University in New York City since 2001.

Jordan conducts clinical research in areas including traumatic brain injury, Alzheimer's disease and dementia.

He specializes in sports neurology and concussions. For 32 years, Jordan has served as a team physician for U.S.A. Boxing. He has served as the Chief Medical Officer of the New York State Athletic Commission, a position he has held since 2011. He was the supervisor during the boxing match that led to the death of Beethaeven Scottland in 2001 and during the boxing match that led to the severe brain damage of Magomed Abdusalamov in 2013.

He is one of the Medical Advisory Physicians for the National Football League (NFL) Player Benefits and is also member of the NFL Players' Association Mackey-White Health and Safety Committee. Jordan also serves on the National Collegiate Athletic Association (NCAA) Concussion Task Force and the Pop Warner Medical Advisory Committee.

Jordan has also written and co-written four books on the topic of concussions and sports neurology:

- Jordan, B.D. & Varlotta, G.P. (2009).Medical Issues in Boxing. Philadelphia: Saunders.
- Jordan, B.D., Tsairis, P., & Warren, R.F. (1998). Sports Neurology (2nd Edition). Philadelphia: Lippincott-Raven.
- Jordan, B.D. (1993). Medical Aspects of Boxing. Boca Raton: CBC Press.
- Jordan, B.D., Tsairis P., & Warren, R.F. (1989). Sports Neurology. Rockville: Aspen Press.

He is the specialty chief editor for the sports neurology section of Frontiers in Neurology.
