= George Blades =

George Blades may refer to:

- George Rowland Blades, 1st Baron Ebbisham (1868–1953), English Conservative politician, printer, and Lord Mayor of London
- George Blades (boxer) (born 1974), American boxer
