= Smoothie King Center =

Multi-purpose indoor arena in New Orleans, Louisiana, United States

- "The Blender" "The Nest"

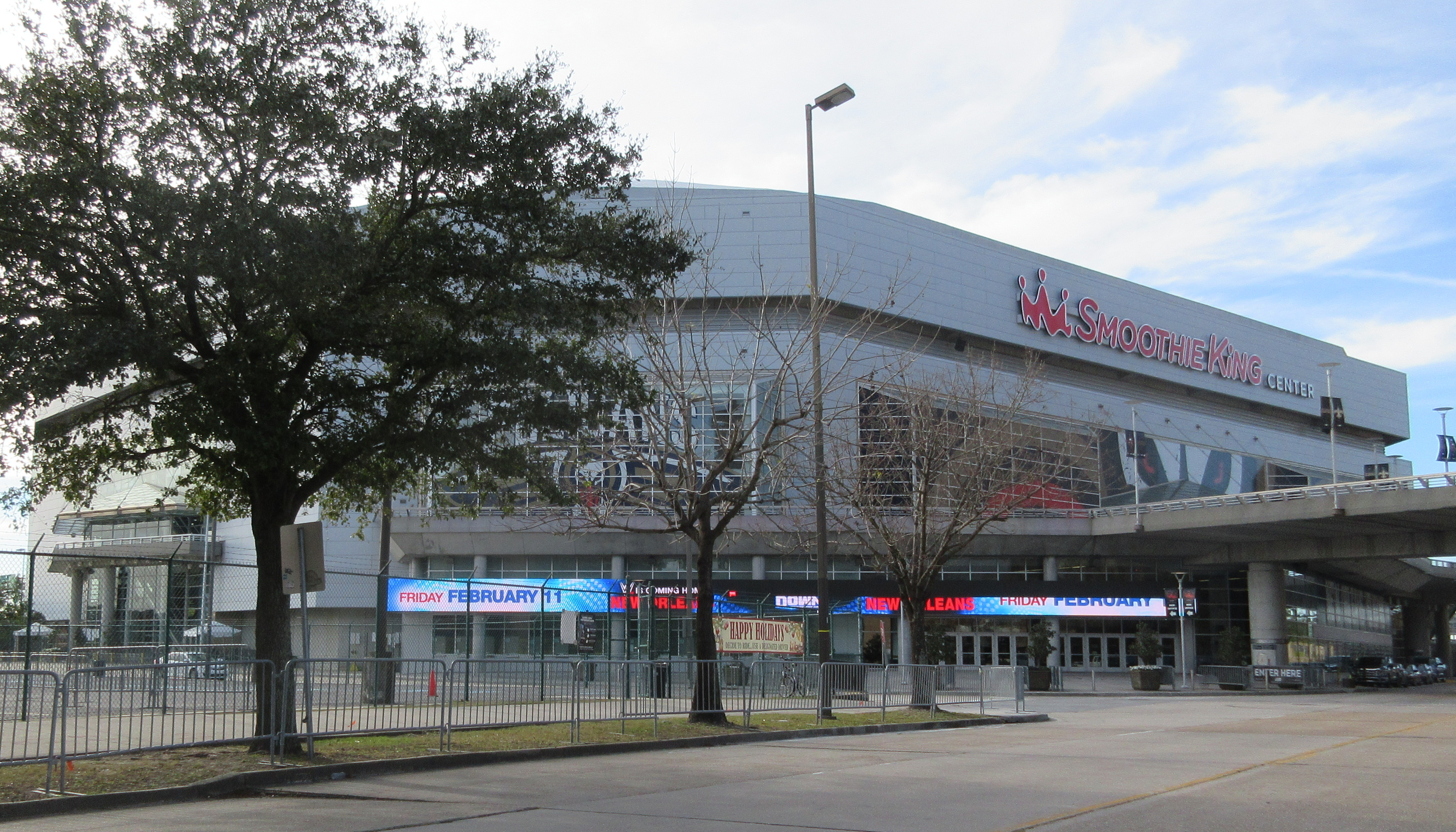
- Smoothie King Center in 2022

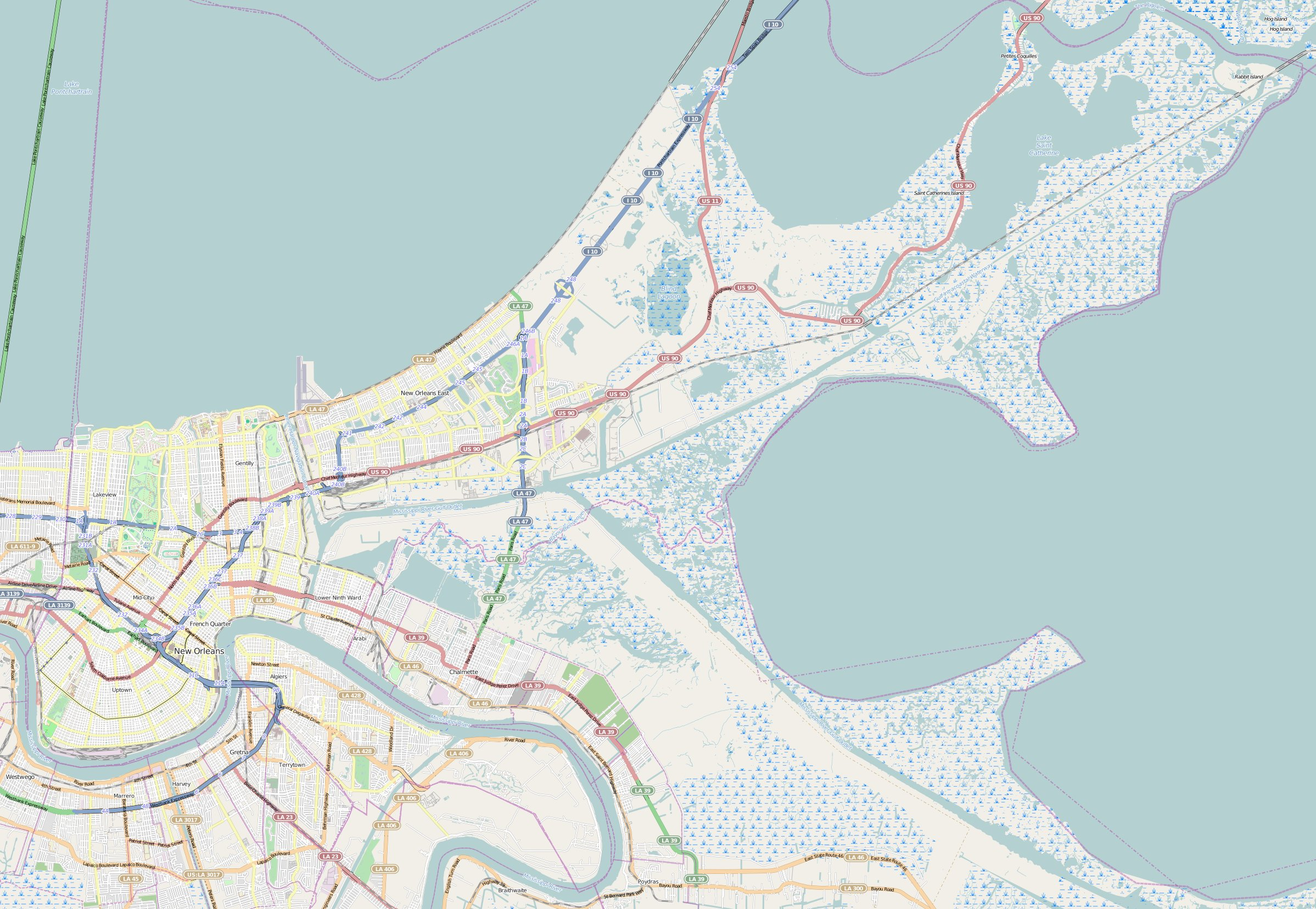
- Location in New Orleans Location in Louisiana Location in the United States
- Former names: New Orleans Arena (1999–2014)
- Address: 1500 Dave Dixon Drive
- Location: New Orleans, Louisiana, U.S.
- Coordinates: 29°56′56″N 90°4′55″W
- Owner: Louisiana Stadium and Exposition District (The State of Louisiana)
- Operator: ASM Global
- Capacity: Concerts: 17,971; NBA basketball: 16,867 College basketball/NBA playoff games: 18,500
- Public transit: 46 Poydras Street; New Orleans Union Passenger Terminal

Construction
- Groundbreaking: November 30, 1995
- Opened: October 29, 1999
- Cost: US$114 million ($220 million in 2025 dollars)
- Architects: Arthur Q. Davis and Partners; Billes-Manning Architects; Hewitt Washington and Associates
- Project manager: CS Associates
- Structural engineer: Walter P Moore
- Services engineers: Smith Seckman Reid, Inc.
- General contractor: Manhattan/Gibbs

Tenants
- New Orleans Brass (ECHL) (1999–2002); New Orleans Hornets/Pelicans (NBA) (2002–2005, 2007–present); New Orleans VooDoo (AFL) (2004–2008, 2011–2015)

Website
- smoothiekingcenter.com

Smoothie King Center (locally referred to as The Blender) is a multi-purpose indoor arena in New Orleans, Louisiana. It is located in the Central Business District, adjacent to the Caesars Superdome. The arena opened in 1999 as New Orleans Arena and has been home to the New Orleans Pelicans of the National Basketball Association (NBA) since 2002. The New Orleans VooDoo of the Arena Football League played their home games in the arena from 2004 until the team disbanded in 2008. The VooDoo resumed play at the arena in March 2011, until after the 2015 AFL season when the franchise folded.

== Arena information ==
The arena was completed in 1999 at a cost of $114 million and officially opened on October 19, 1999. The arena seats 17,805 for concerts, 16,867 for Pelicans games, 18,500 for college basketball and Pelicans playoff games, and 16,900 for ice hockey and arena football. It has 2,800 club seats and 56 luxury suites.

The arena as a concert venue can seat 7,500 for half-stage shows, 17,221 for end-stage shows and 17,805 for a center-stage shows. For trade shows and conventions the arena features 17,000 square feet (1,600 m^{2}) of space. The ceiling is 65 feet (20 m) to beam and roof, 70 feet (21.5 m) to the top of the arena.

== History ==
Logo as New Orleans Arena, 1999–2014

In 1999, the arena's first tenant, the New Orleans Brass ice hockey team of the ECHL played their first home game in the arena. The team played their final three seasons in the arena. When the New Orleans Hornets arrived in 2002, they persuaded the state government to demand that the Brass foot the cost of converting the arena between basketball and hockey configurations. That expense was more than the Brass were willing to pay, and they were forced to fold due to the lack of another suitable arena.

The Hornets played their first game at the Smoothie King Center versus the Utah Jazz on October 30, 2002. The Jazz had called New Orleans home from 1974 to 1979.

The New Orleans VooDoo, of the Arena Football League (AFL), began playing their home games in the arena in February 2004.

Following Hurricane Katrina on August 29, 2005, medical operations that had previously been housed in the Superdome were moved to the Arena. Medical personnel had been working in an area of the Superdome with poor lighting, leaking ceilings, and soggy carpet. The Arena's design was tested in 1996 by CPP, a wind engineering consulting firm, so it fared far better than the Superdome during the storm and was in better condition to house sensitive medical operations. Thus, unlike the Superdome, the Arena reopened to activities only one month after the storm. On March 8, 2006, the Hornets played their first home game at the arena since Hurricane Katrina and the start of the 2005–06 season. A sellout crowd of 17,744 watched the Los Angeles Lakers defeat the Hornets, 113–107.

In 2006, the arena installed an LED centerhung video and scoring system from Daktronics. The centerhung installation is made up of two ring displays and eight video displays, as well as scoreboards. This installation is fully integrated with the more than 875 feet (267 m) of ribbon display technology that was installed in the arena in 2002. In the summer of 2008, new Daktronics "see-through" shot clocks were installed, replacing the existing box units.

The New Orleans VooDoo of the Arena Football League resumed play at the arena in March 2011.

In 2013, the arena underwent a significant upgrade. The 2013 renovations were primarily focused on the gameday experience inside the arena. These upgrades include updates to the suites and club levels, expanding the club levels, creating new Loge Boxes, and a new Party Perch. Other upgrades include upgraded concession stands, upgraded LED boards, and other in-house amenities for the teams and performers that use the arena.

On February 5, 2014, it was announced that a 10-year agreement was reached to rename New Orleans Arena the Smoothie King Center prior to the 2014 NBA All-Star Game.

In September and October 2014, exterior renovations were made to the Smoothie King Center, including new entrances, painting the center from bluish green to light gray, and a new outer LED lighting system similar to the Mercedes-Benz Superdome's own. However, some original plans, such as to add an overhang to the building, were cancelled.

The Hornets/Pelicans have enjoyed a winning record of 341–275 (.554) during the regular season and 15–9 (.625) during the playoffs in home games played at the New Orleans Arena/Smoothie King Center as of the conclusion of the 2018–19 season.

=== Seating capacity ===
The seating capacity for NBA basketball games has gone:

Years	Capacity
1999–2007	17,200
2007–2013	17,188
2013–2014	17,003
2014–present	16,867

== Notable events ==
=== Sports ===
==== NBA ====
Smoothie King Center has hosted the 2008 NBA All-Star Game, the 2014 NBA All-Star Game, and the 2017 NBA All-Star Game, after the NBA pulled the game from Charlotte's Spectrum Center due to North Carolina's "bathroom bill".

==== College sports ====
In 2011, the arena hosted the Southeast Regional of the NCAA Division I men's basketball tournament. The arena also hosted the first and second rounds of the NCAA men's basketball tournament in 2007 and 2010.

The 2012 Southeastern Conference men's basketball tournament was held at the arena.

The arena hosted the 2004 Women's Final Four and 2013 Women's Final Four. It has also hosted the 2008 NCAA women's basketball tournament South Regionals. The arena was set to host the 2020 Women's Final Four, before being canceled due to the ongoing coronavirus pandemic.

The 2002 NCAA Division I Women's Volleyball Final Four was held at the New Orleans Arena in December 2002.

The 2019 and 2024 SEC gymnastics championships were held at the arena.

==== Arena football ====
The arena hosted ArenaBowl XXI in 2007, ArenaBowl XXII in 2008 and ArenaBowl XXV in 2012.

==== MMA and boxing ====
- September 9, 2000 – The arena hosted the light heavyweight title fight between Roy Jones Jr. and Eric Harding. Jones won by TKO in the 10th round.
- June 6, 2015 – UFC Fight Night: Boetsch vs. Henderson.
- July 19, 2025 – UFC 318: Holloway vs. Poirier 3.

==== Other events ====
- 2000 – The Professional Bull Riders (PBR) Bud Light Cup tour event
- 2001 – Professional Bull Riders (PBR) Bud Light Cup tour event
- 2002 – Professional Bull Riders (PBR) Bud Light Cup tour event was held in the arena.
- 2003 – Professional Bull Riders (PBR) Built Ford Tough Series tour event
- August 2003 – The Bassmaster Classic XXXIII weigh-in was held in the arena.
- March 2007 – The Professional Bull Riders (PBR) Built Ford Tough Series tour event was held in the arena.
- April 2010 – The Professional Bull Riders (PBR) event was held in the arena for a Built Ford Tough Series event.
- March 2015 - AMSOIL Arenacross
- November 2019; February 2022 - Hot Wheels Monster Trucks Live

=== Professional wrestling ===
The arena has hosted numerous WWE events, including Royal Rumble in 2001, Extreme Rules in 2009, Hell in a Cell in 2011, Elimination Chamber in 2013, and the arena hosted Money in the Bank in 2026. It was also the venue for the 2014 WWE Hall of Fame induction ceremony and the following episode of Raw, as part of WrestleMania XXX weekend.

In 2018, the arena hosted NXT TakeOver: New Orleans, the WWE Hall of Fame induction ceremony, and the subsequent episodes of Raw and SmackDown during WrestleMania 34 weekend. The arena has also hosted various other editions of Raw and SmackDown throughout the years.

== See also ==
- Champions Square
- Sports in New Orleans

== Gallery ==
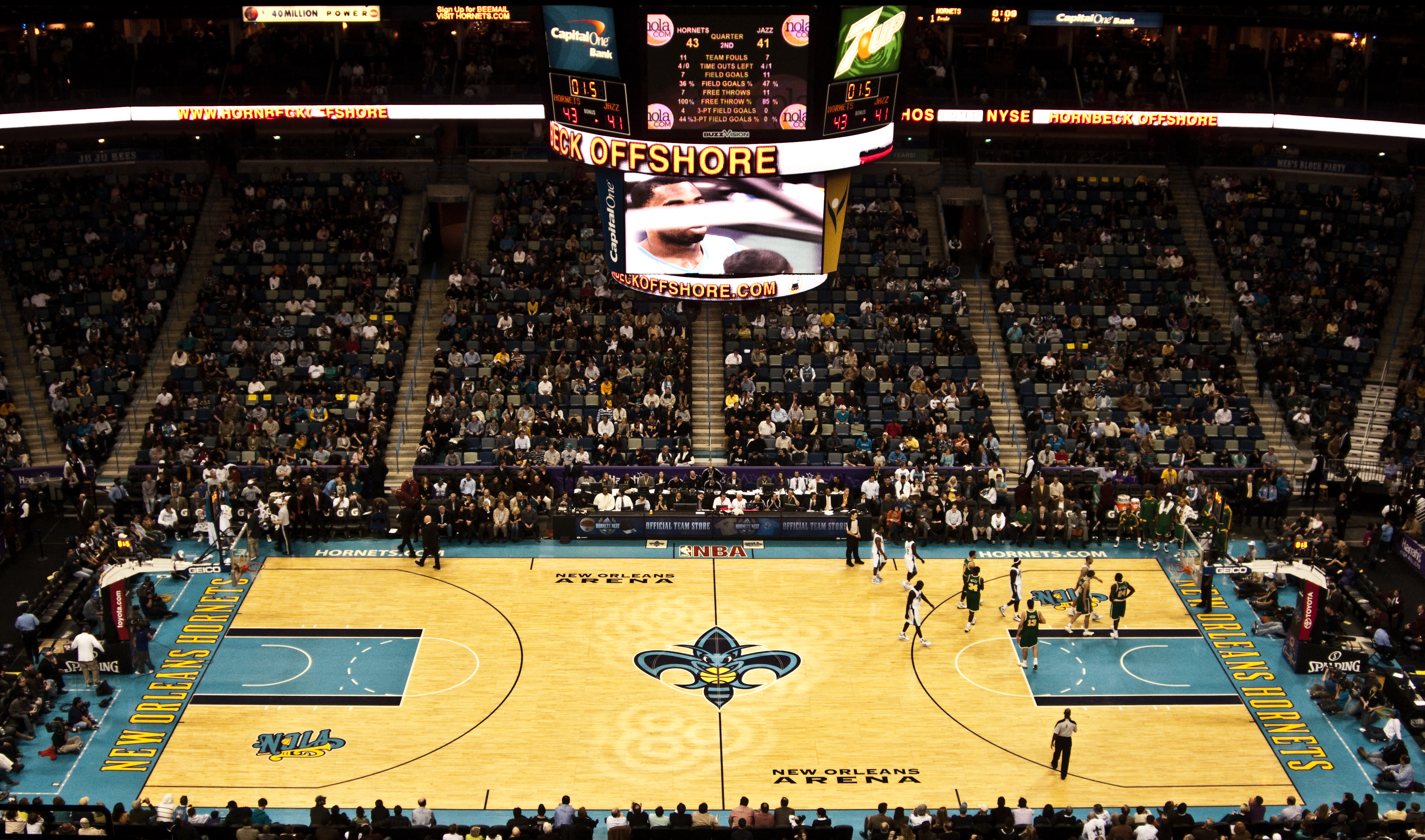
New Orleans Arena – New Orleans Hornets Court

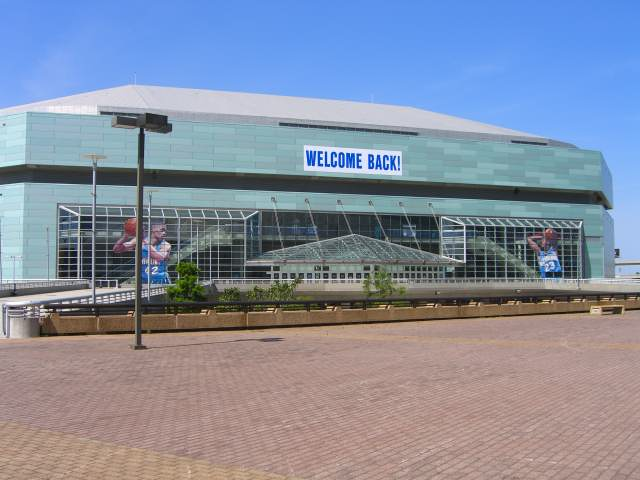
New Orleans Arena – 2006

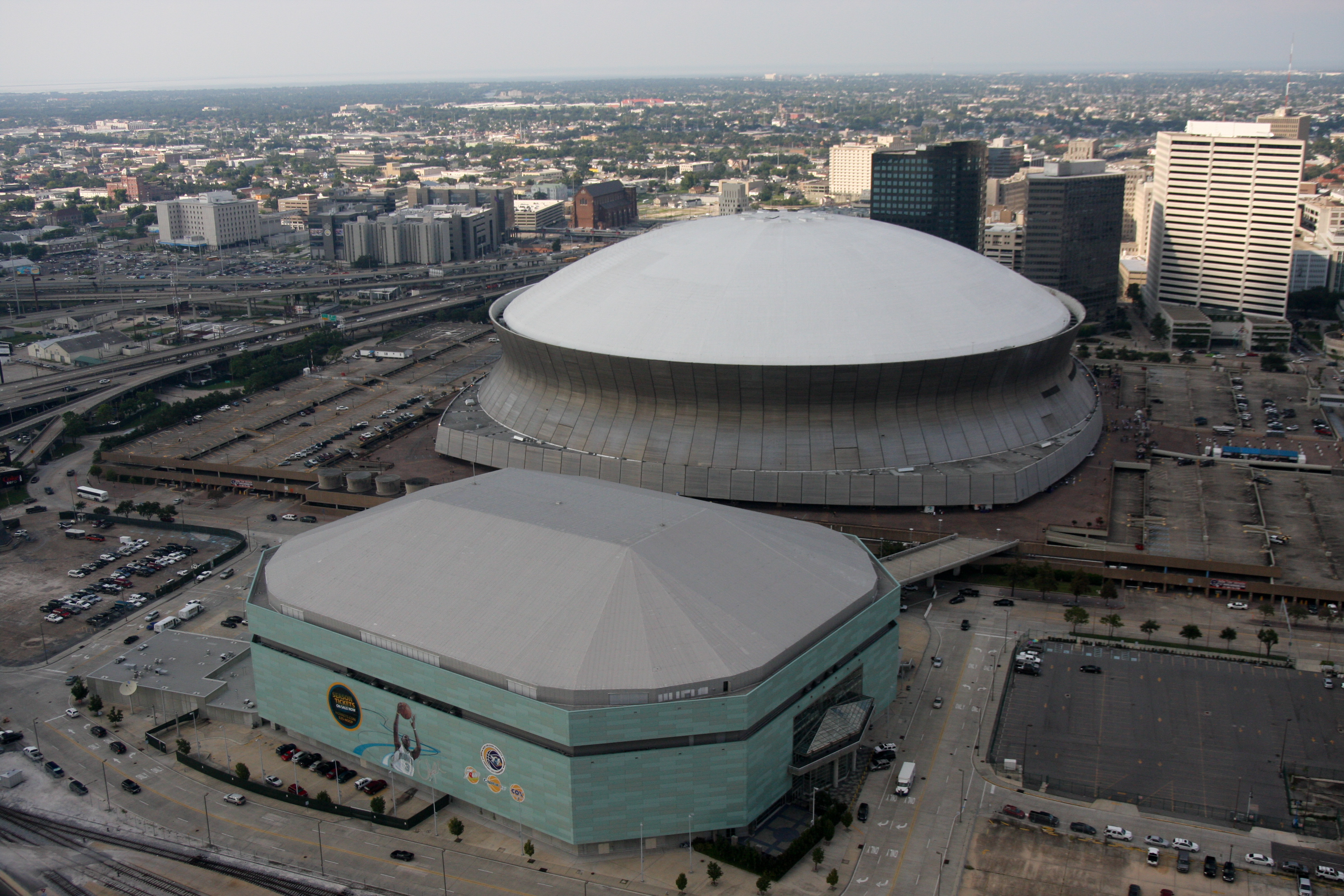
New Orleans Arena – 2008

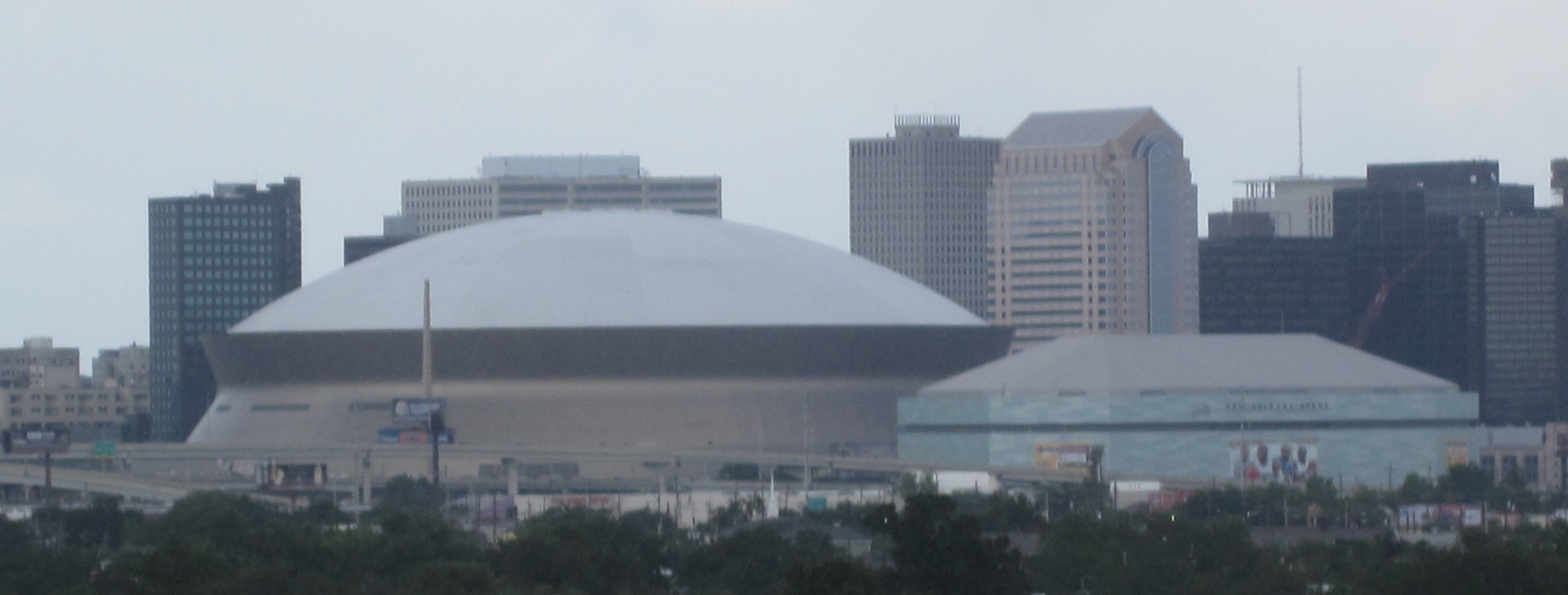
New Orleans Arena – 2011

Events and tenants
Preceded by Charlotte Coliseum	Home of the New Orleans Hornets/Pelicans; 2002 – present	Succeeded by current
Preceded by first arena CenturyTel Center	Home of the New Orleans VooDoo; 2004 – 2005, 2007 – 2008; 2011 – present	Succeeded by last arena current
Preceded by Thomas & Mack Center; Toyota Center; Scotiabank Arena	Host of the NBA All-Star Game; 2008; 2014; 2017	Succeeded by US Airways Center; Madison Square Garden; Staples Center
Preceded by Madison Square Garden	Home of the Royal Rumble; 2001	Succeeded by Philips Arena
Preceded by Thomas & Mack Center; US Airways Center	Host of the ArenaBowl; ArenaBowl XXI – ArenaBowl XXII; ArenaBowl XXV	Succeeded by Spokane Veterans Memorial Arena; TBA
Preceded by Pepsi Center	NCAA Women's Division I Basketball tournament Finals Venue; 2013	Succeeded by Bridgestone Arena
