= Ray Lathon =

American boxer

Ray Lathon (October 27, 1966, in St. Louis, Missouri – December 12, 2000, in St. Louis) was an American boxer.

== Amateur career ==
Known as "Lethal", Lathon was a stellar amateur and, in 1989, he was the U.S. Amateur Middleweight champion and won the Golden Gloves and USA Boxing titles. He also fought as part of Team USA at the World Championships in Moscow.

== Professional career ==
Lathon turned professional in 1990, and suffered his only professional defeat to Montell Griffin in 1994. Lathon's career record is a 22–1 with 21 knockouts overall.

== Murder ==
On December 12, 2000, after finishing a workout in a St. Louis gym, Lathon was shot and killed execution-style by a masked gunman. Lathon had been in training for an upcoming attempt at the NABF Cruiserweight title. Ahmad Adisa, age 27, was convicted of first-degree murder and sentenced to life in prison without parole. At his trial, evidence suggested that Adisa was hired to kill Lathon for a $10,000 payment, though no one else has been charged in the case. Assistant Circuit Attorney Dwight Warren told jurors that Lathon was killed in retaliation for his suspected involvement in the kidnapping and torture of a drug dealer in 1999. Authorities said the drug dealer was beaten and burned with cigarettes, but Lathon was never charged.

== Professional boxing record ==
23 wins (21 knockouts, 2 decisions), 1 loss (1 decision)
Result	Record	Opponent	Type	Round	Date	Location	Notes
Win	7-15	(United States) Rodney McSwain	UD	8	10/10/2000	(United States) The Spotlight, St. Louis, Missouri	
Win	27-16-1	(United States) Reggie Miller	KO	2	08/02/2000	(United States) The Spotlight, St. Louis, Missouri	Miller knocked out at 2:59 of the second round.
Win	1-4	(United States) Kevin Robertson	TKO	1	07/12/1999	(United States) The Spotlight, St. Louis, Missouri	Referee stopped the bout at 1:11 of the first round.
Win	14-6	(Ivory Coast) Onebo Maxime	KO	1	25/06/1999	(United States) Station Casino, St. Louis, Missouri	WBB World Cruiserweight Title. Maxime knocked out at 1:32 of the first round.
Win	11-76-1	(United States) Rocky Bentley	TKO	1	04/05/1999	(United States) The Ambassador, St. Louis, Missouri	Referee stopped the bout at 2:15 of the first round.
Win	7-13	(United States) Tracy Barrios	KO	3	26/01/1999	(United States) UAW Hall, St. Louis, Missouri	Barrios knocked out at 3:00 of the third round.
Win	15-28-1	(United States) Harry "Heatwave" Daniels	KO	1	17/11/1998	(United States) UAW Hall, St. Louis, Missouri	Daniels knocked out at 2:35 of the first round.
Win	23-8-2	(United States) Booker T Word	KO	2	15/09/1998	(United States) UAW Hall, St. Louis, Missouri	Word knocked out at 1:43 of the second round.
Win	2-14	(United States) Earl Abernathy	TKO	1	23/01/1997	(United States) The Ambassador, St. Louis, Missouri	Referee stopped the bout at 2:37 of the first round.
Loss	13-0	(United States) Montell Griffin	UD	12	12/09/1994	(United States) Great Western Forum, Inglewood, California	
Win	10-10-2	(Mexico) Jesus Castaneda	KO	4	13/06/1994	(United States) Great Western Forum, Inglewood, California	Castaneda knocked out at 2:56 of the fourth round.
Win	12-19	(United States) Tim Knight	PTS	6	12/02/1994	(United States) America's Center, St. Louis, Missouri	
Win	--	Gino Galliano	KO	1	24/01/1994	(United States) St. Louis, Missouri	
Win	4-15	(United States) Donnie Penelton	KO	1	15/05/1993	(United States) Eagles Auditorium, Milwaukee, Wisconsin	
Win	5-1	(United States) Ed Kelly	TKO	1	02/03/1993	(United States) Foxwoods, Mashantucket, Connecticut	
Win	2-19-1	(United States) John "Rocky Young" Williams	KO	1	28/08/1992	(United States) Trump Plaza Hotel and Casino, Atlantic City, New Jersey	
Win	5-11-1	(United States) Jeff Bowman	KO	4	04/05/1992	(United States) Bill Harris Arena, Mobile, Alabama	
Win	--	Ken Chisholm	KO	1	03/04/1992	(United States) Trump Plaza Hotel and Casino, Atlantic City, New Jersey	
Win	4-5	(United States) Anthony Williams	KO	5	04/10/1991	(United States) Resorts Casino Hotel, Atlantic City, New Jersey	
Win	5-4-1	(United States) Shawn Jewell	KO	3	11/05/1991	(United States) Portland, Oregon	
Win	0-5	(United States) Jessie Wade	KO	1	25/04/1991	(United States) Shriner's Auditorium, Mobile, Alabama	
Win	0-4	(United States) Bruce Stallworth	KO	1	21/09/1990	(United States) Clarion Hotel, St. Louis, Missouri	
Win	2-4	(United States) William Knorr	TKO	1	28/07/1990	(United States) Trump Castle, Atlantic City, New Jersey	Referee stopped the bout at 2:37 of the first round.
Win	0-1	(United States) Jeff Summers	KO	1	16/02/1990	(United States) Clarion Hotel, St. Louis, Missouri	
