= Olanda Anderson =

American boxer

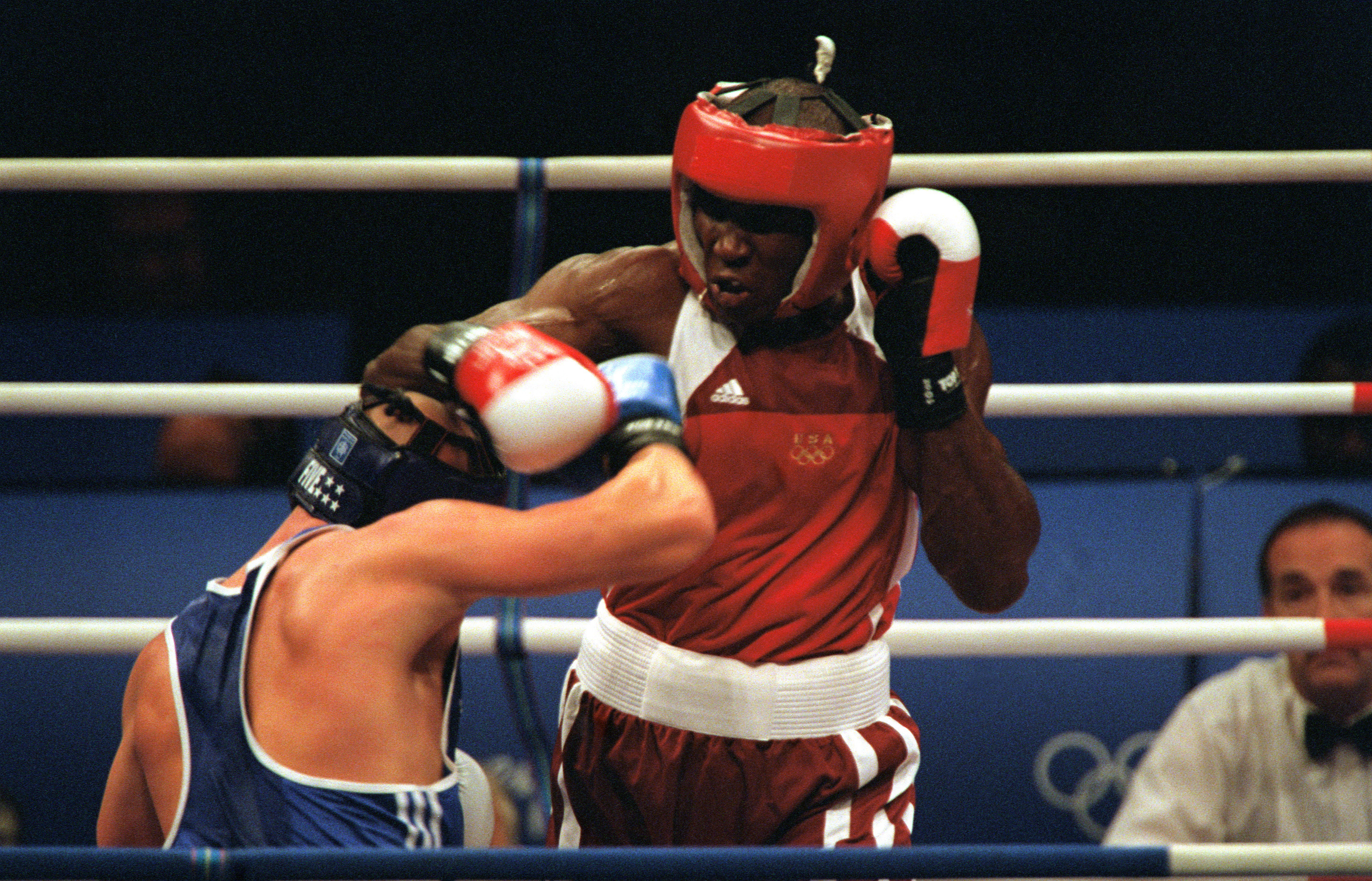
Anderson fighting against Rudolf Kraj at the 2000 Summer Olympics in Sydney, Australia on September 24, 2000.

Olanda Anderson (born November 16, 1972) is an American former boxer best known for being a member of the 2000 United States Olympic Team as a light heavyweight.

== Background ==
Born in Sumter, South Carolina, Anderson became a U.S. Army Staff Sergeant.

== Amateur career ==
Anderson was the National Amateur Light Heavyweight Champion in 1998 and 2000.

=== Olympic results ===
- 1st round bye
- Lost to Rudolf Kraj (Czech Republic) 13-14

== Professional career ==
Anderson turned pro in 2002 and was undefeated in the only two recorded bouts of his career. Both bouts were one week apart in January 2002.

Awards and achievements
Preceded by Anthony Stewart	United States Amateur Light Heavyweight Champion; 1998	Succeeded by Michael Simms
Preceded by Michael Simms	United States Amateur Light Heavyweight Champion; 2000	Succeeded by DeAndrey Abron
