= Roy Jones Jr. vs. Montell Griffin =

Boxing competition

The Battle of the Undefeated
- Date: March 21, 1997
- Venue: Mark G. Etess Arena, Trump Taj Mahal, Atlantic City, New Jersey, U.S.
- Title(s) on the line: WBC light heavyweight title

Tale of the tape
Boxer	Roy Jones Jr.	Montell Griffin
Nickname	Junior	Ice
Hometown	Pensacola, Florida, U.S.	Chicago, Illinois, U.S.
Pre-fight record	34–0 (29 KO)	26–0 (18 KO)
Age	28 years, 2 months	26 years, 9 months
Height	5 ft 11 in (180 cm)	5 ft 7 in (170 cm)
Weight	175 lb (79 kg)	175 lb (79 kg)
Style	Orthodox	Orthodox
Recognition	WBC; Light Heavyweight Champion; The Ring No. 1 ranked pound-for-pound fighter 3-division world champion	WBC; No. 5 Ranked Light Heavyweight; WBU light heavyweight champion

Result
- Griffin wins via 9th-round disqualification

Roy Jones Jr. vs. Montell Griffin, billed as The Battle of the Undefeated, was a professional boxing match contested on March 21, 1997 for the WBC light heavyweight championship.

== Background ==
In his previous fight Roy Jones Jr. had captured the WBC light heavyweight championship after defeating Mike McCallum, making Jones a three-division world champion after previously winning titles in the middleweight and super middleweight divisions. For Jones' first defense, he was matched up against the undefeated Montell "Ice" Griffin, who in his previous fight had defeated James Toney for the second time to capture the less-regarded WBU light heavyweight title. Prior to the fight, Griffin was seen by some as possibly the greatest challenge Jones, who was ranked by The Ring magazine as the number-one pound-for-pound fighter in all of boxing, had faced in his professional career. Jones entered the fight as the overwhelming favorite, with the odds being as high as 17–1 in his favor, though they went down to 6–1 by the time of the fight.

== The fight ==
Jones, who had rarely lost rounds on the scorecards, was taken to the limit by Griffin, who controlled the early portion of the fight. Jones eventually regained himself and by round nine, had taken a narrow lead on two of the judge's scorecards with scores of 77–75 and 76–75. The other judge, however, had Griffin ahead with a score of 76–75. In the ninth and final round, Griffin would dictate the pace for most of the first two minutes. But as the second minute came to a close, Jones staggered Griffin with a right hand. Jones then proceeded to attack Griffin in hopes of securing the knockout victory. Overwhelmed by Jones' flurry, Griffin took a knee with 45 seconds remaining in the round in an effort to avoid further punishment. However, Jones then landed a right–left combination, causing Griffin to slump forward and lay face-first on the canvas. Referee Tony Perez then proceeded to count Griffin out and the fight was stopped at the 2:27 mark. Thinking he had picked up the knockout victory, Jones began to celebrate with his corner, but Perez then announced that he had disqualified Jones for the illegal blow, giving Jones his first professional loss and making Griffin the new WBC light heavyweight champion.

HBO's unofficial scorer Harold Lederman had Jones ahead 76-75 after eight rounds. The New York Daily News had Griffin ahead 77-75.

== Aftermath ==
Jones' explained after the match that he "wasn't sure (Griffin) was down. I didn't have time to think and see whether he was down. I thought he was down and he might come back at me. I wasn't looking at his knees. I was looking at his face." Jones also put the blame on referee Tony Perez, saying "I didn't feel the ref try to separate me at all." Perez reiterated that he began counting Griffin out because, he should've been able to continue, he would've only taken one or two point from Jones. However, when Griffin was unable to continue, Perez was left with no choice but to disqualify Jones for the foul.

Griffin initially talked of a unification match with then-WBA and IBF light heavyweight champion Virgil Hill, but he instead agreed to a rematch with Jones less than five months after their first fight on 7 August.

== Undercard ==
Confirmed bouts:

== Broadcasting ==
Country	Broadcaster
United States	HBO

Preceded by vs. Mike McCallum	Roy Jones Jr.'s bouts 21 March 1997	Succeeded by Rematch
Preceded by vs. James Toney	Montell Griffin's bouts 21 March 1997	Succeeded by Rematch
