= Beethaeven Scottland =

American boxer (1975–2001)

Beethavean Scottland
Personal information
- Nickname: Honey Bee
- Born: January 11, 1975 North Brentwood, Maryland, US
- Died: July 1, 2001 (aged 26) New York City, New York, US
- Height: 5 ft 9 in (175 cm)
- Weight: Super Middleweight

Boxing career
- Reach: 72 in (183 cm)
- Stance: Southpaw

Boxing record
- Total fights: 29
- Wins: 20
- Win by KO: 9
- Losses: 7
- Draws: 2
- No contests: 0

Beethaeven "Bee" Scottland (January 11, 1975 – July 1, 2001) was an American professional boxer who competed from 1995 until 2001. Scottland's career record was 20-7-2, with nine of his victories coming by knockout. He was knocked out twice in his professional career. He died of injuries suffered in his final match.

== Background ==
Beethaeven Scottland was named after composer, Ludwig van Beethoven. His mother was a corrections officer and his father was a classical pianist. He was one of eight children and grew up in Brentwood, Maryland, in the Washington, DC suburbs.

== Boxing career ==
Scottland began boxing at age 12 in the basement of his first trainer Derek Matthews. He would go on to fight 77 bouts as an amateur. As he began winning Golden Gloves bouts, Scottland began training with Adrian Davis at Round One Boxing in Capitol Heights, Maryland.

Scottland made his professional debut in 1995. The next year, he married Denise Lewis, a childhood friend. Scottland shared that boxing had helped him turn his life around after making poor choices in childhood. He credited the sport and training regime to helping him be a better father and husband, explaining,

" I don’t party. I get up at 5 in the morning to run. I train. I’m in the gym every day. I come home and be a father to my kids, and a husband to my wife. That’s it.”

Scottland competed as a super middleweight in bouts around the Baltimore and Washington, DC suburbs. Alongside boxing, Scottland worked as a pest exterminator in Hyattsville, Maryland to support his family.

=== Professional results ===
20 Wins (9 knockouts, 11 decisions), 7 Losses, 2 Draws
Res.	Record	Opponent	Type	Rd., Time	Date	Location	Notes
Loss	20-7-2	(United States) George Khalid Jones	TKO	10	2001-06-26	(United States) U.S.S. Intrepid, New York, New York, USA	
Win	20–6-2	(United States) Roosevelt Walker	TKO	7	2000-08-01	(United States) Washington, District of Columbia, USA	
Win	19-6-2	(United States) Darren Whitley	UD	8/8	2000-07-12	(United States) Martin's West, Woodlawn, Maryland, USA	
Loss	18-6-2	(United States) Thomas Tate	UD	10/10	2000-03-23	(United States) Michael's Eighth Avenue, Glen Burnie, Maryland, USA	
Win	18-5-2	(United States) Jerome Hill	PTS	4/4	1999-12-11	(United States) Springfield, Virginia, USA	
Loss	17–5-2	(United States) Allen Watts	MD	6/6	1999-11-19	(United States) DC Armory, Washington, D.C., USA	
Win	17-4-2	(United States) James Mullins	TKO	4	1999-10-23	(United States) Springfield, Virginia, USA	
Win	16–4-2	(United States) James Mullins	TKO	1	1999-08-27	(United States) Annandale, Virginia, USA	
Win	15–4-2	(United States) Arnold Fountain	SD	12	1999-05-13	(United States) Michael's Eighth Avenue, Glen Burnie, Maryland, USA	
Win	14–4-2	(United States) Jerome Hill	PTS	4/4	1999-03-24	(United States) Michael's Eighth Avenue, Glen Burnie, Maryland, USA	
Win	13–4-2	(United States) James Gatlin	TKO	5/6	1998-11-12	(United States) Claridge Hotel & Casino, Atlantic City, New Jersey, USA	
Win	12–4-2	(United States) Dennis McKinney	UD	6/6	1998-09-24	(United States) Michael's Eighth Avenue, Glen Burnie, Maryland, USA	
Loss	11–4-2	(United States) John James	KO	6/6	1997-10-24	(United States) Claridge Hotel & Casino, Atlantic City, New Jersey, USA	
Win	11–3-2	(United States) Anthony Harris	KO	1	1997-10-06	(United States) Washington, D.C., USA	
Loss	10–3-2	(United States) Eric Harding	UD	8	1997-06-29	(United States) Dressler Arena, Hartford, Connecticut, USA	
Loss	10–2-2	(United States) Eric Harding	UD	4	1997-01-10	(United States) Mohegan Sun Casino, Uncasville, Connecticut, USA	
Draw	10–1-2	(United States) Bernice Barber	SD	10/10	1996-09-26	(United States) Michael's Eighth Avenue, Glen Burnie, Maryland, USA	
Win	10–1-1	(United States) Ray Healy	PTS	6/6	1996-08-23	(United States) Ballys Park Place Hotel Casino, Atlantic City, New Jersey, USA	
Win	9–1-1	(United States) Berry Butler	KO	6/6	1996-06-20	(United States) Michael's Eighth Avenue, Glen Burnie, Maryland, USA	
Win	8–1-1	(United States) Valery Pestovsky	PTS	6/6	1996-05-17	(United States) Washington, D.C., USA	
Win	7–1-1	(United States) Ron Woodley	TKO	3	1996-02-15	(United States) Michael's Eighth Avenue, Glen Burnie, Maryland, USA	
Loss	6–1-1	(United States) Allen Watts	TKO	6	1995-11-21	(United States) Convention Center, Washington, D.C., USA	
Draw	6–0-1	(United States) Robert Thomas	PTS	6	1995-10-11	(United States) Michael's Eighth Avenue, Glen Burnie, Maryland, USA	
Win	6–0	(United States) Alphonso Dyer	PTS	6/6	1995-09-14	(United States) Martin's Crosswinds, Greenbelt, Maryland, USA	
Win	5–0	(United States) Wes Sivills	TKO	1	1995-08-30	(United States) Washington, D.C., USA	
Win	4–0	(United States) Calvin Moody	TKO	4	1995-05-25	(United States) Michael's Eighth Avenue, Glen Burnie, Maryland, USA	
Win	3–0	(United States) Ed Bryant	PTS	4	1995-05-12	(United States) Show Place Arena, Upper Marlboro, Maryland, USA	
Win	2–0	(United States) Derrick Stinson	KO	4	1995-03-24	(United States) Michael's Eighth Avenue, Glen Burnie, Maryland, USA	
Win	1–0	(United States) Stan Braxton	UD	4	1995-02-02	(United States) Michael's Eighth Avenue, Glen Burnie, Maryland, USA	

== Final fight ==
On June 26, 2001, Scottland stepped in the ring to face George Khalid Jones as part of an ESPN2 telecast from aboard the USS Intrepid museum ship in New York City. The fight was promoted by Dino Duva, Jones' manager. Scottland was a late replacement for David Telesco, who at the time was a championship contender who only a year earlier had fought and lost to Roy Jones Jr. for the undisputed championship at light heavyweight.

"Whoever I fight...I just hope I don't kill him."

— George Khalid Jones, prior to the bout

At the time, Scottland was preparing to fight Dana Rucker in the super middleweight division for the Maryland State belt. Rucker pulled out of the fight with an injury, opening the opportunity for Scottland to fight Jones.

Prior to the fight, Scottland considered giving up boxing prior to the fight, but was struggling financially, and encouraged by the $8,000 purse and opportunity to appear on primetime television. It was the largest purse of his career.

Jones had a height and weight advantage on Scottland, who was three inches shorter and ten pounds lighter. Scottland usually fought as a super middleweight, but moved up a division to fight Jones as a light heavyweight.

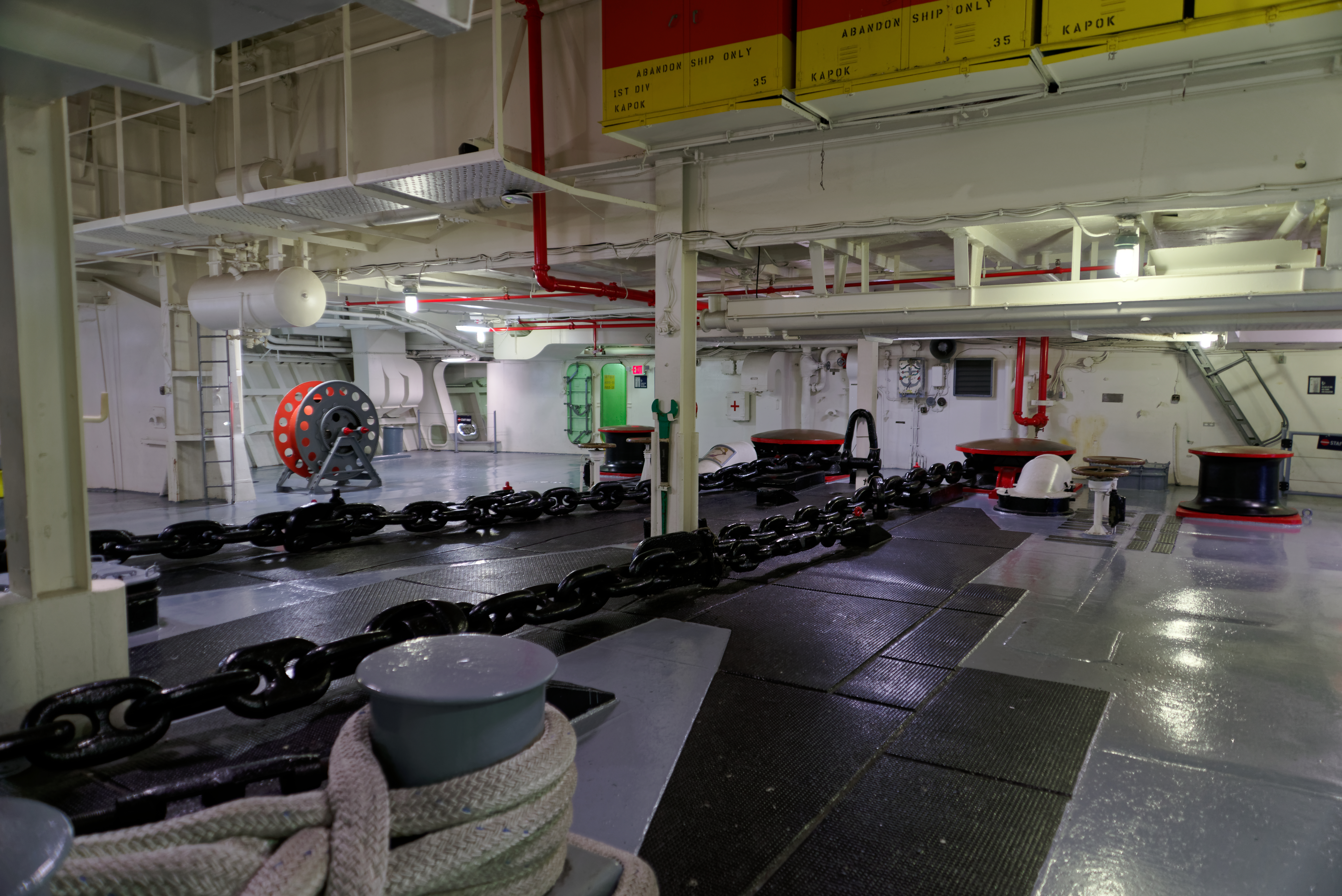
Interior deck of the USS Intrepid, the vessel where the fight took place

The overmatched Scottland lasted into the tenth round of the fight, but had been hit with many flush shots from Jones throughout the fight. By the end of the fourth round, Jones landed 64 more punches than Scottland. Commentator Max Kellerman, who was calling the fight for ESPN2 that evening, said numerous times on the broadcast that the fight should have been halted, as early as the fourth round. When trapped in a corner in the fifth round, Scottland took twenty-five consecutive punches to the head, without the referee intervening. In the tenth round, Jones knocked Scottland to the canvas and was counted out having not risen to his feet. Scottland had to be helped from the ring, and shortly afterwards fell into a coma.

== Aftermath ==
Scottland died six days later on July 1, 2001 at Bellevue Hospital Center. He never regained consciousness after falling into a coma. His official cause of death was classified as "blunt impacts to the head with subdural haematoma" sustained in the fight. Scottland was survived by his wife Denise Scottland and four children. Scottland's death left a considerable impact on the Washington Beltway boxing community. Local promoters and fighters considered Scottland's loss a tragedy as he was highly regarded and well liked by everyone. Boxer Hasim Rahman, who shared a trainer with Scottland and trained at the same gym paid for Scottland's funeral expenses.

=== Critiques ===
Referee Arthur Mercante Jr. was criticized in the media for years afterward for allowing Scottland to continue fighting. Critics, including Jack Newfield, put the blame on authorities, the referees and medical staff as well as the lack of medical and regulatory negligence of the boxing industry. Kellerman, who was ringside at the fight, placed the blame on the athletic commission, and blamed himself for not doing more while he was commentating on air. The New York State Assembly called for an investigation on conduct by ringside physician Barry D. Jordan for not stopping the fight.

Later that month, Scottland's story appeared on the ABC television network's "Nightline" program, sparking a national conversation about increasing safety in the sport.

Scottland's death was the fourth death of a boxer in New York since 1979. Two months after the fight, New York Governor George Pataki replaced Mel Southard as chairman of the New York State Athletic Commission, in an attempt to improve standards around boxing regulation.

Scottland's widow later sued New York officials and boxing promoter Dino Duva for responsibility over her husband's death.

=== George Khalid Jones ===
Jones was seriously affected by Scottland's death. Shortly after the fight, Jones, announced that he would be retiring from the ring, feeling responsible for what happened. Bee's widow Denise Scottland would later reach out to Jones to tell him she did not blame him for her husband's death, and to encourage him to continue fighting. The two later forged a friendship.

Jones returned to the ring to fight Eric Harding in December 2001. In the ring, he wore trunks with "Bee R.I.P." stitched on them.

On September 30, 2005, Jones fought Glen Johnson in a bout with the winner to face Clinton Woods for the IBF light heavyweight title. Jones was knocked out in the tenth round.
