= List of U.S. national Golden Gloves light heavyweight champions =

This is a list of United States national Golden Gloves champions in the light heavyweight division, along with the state or region they represented. The weight limit for light heavyweights was first contested at 175 lb (79 kg), but was increased to 178 lb (81 kg) in 1972.

- 1928 - Dave Maier - Chicago
- 1929 - Edward Wills - Chicago
- 1930 - Buck Everett - Gary
- 1931 - Jack Kranz - Gary
- 1932 - Vernon Miller - Davenport
- 1933 - Max Marek - Chicago
- 1934 - Joe Louis - Detroit
- 1935 - Joe Bauer - Cleveland
- 1936 - Carl Vinciquerra - Omaha
- 1937 - Herman West - Centralia
- 1938 - Linto Guerrieri - Rockford
- 1939 - Jimmy Reeves - Cleveland
- 1940 - James Richie - St. Louis
- 1941 - Hezzie Williams - Chicago
- 1942 - Tom Attra - Fort Worth
- 1943 - Reedy Evans - Chicago
- 1944 - Ray Standdifer - Cleveland
- 1945 - Tom Attra - Fort Worth
- 1946 - Bob Foxworth - St. Louis
- 1947 - Dan Bucceroni - Kenosha
- 1948 - Buddy Turner - Cincinnati
- 1949 - Wesbury Bascom - St. Louis
- 1950 - Jesse Brown - Toledo
- 1951 - Bobby Jackson - Cleveland
- 1952 - Eddie Jones - Chicago
- 1953 - Calvin Butler - Cleveland
- 1954 - Orville Pitts - Dayton
- 1955 - Eddie Jenkins - Detroit
- 1956 - Jim Boyd - Montgomery
- 1957 - Ernie Terrell - Chicago
- 1958 - Kent Green - Chicago
- 1959 - Cassius Clay - Louisville
- 1960 - Jefferson Davis- Nashville
- 1961 - Charles Williams - St. Louis
- 1962 - Billy Joiner - Cincinnati
- 1963 - Ted Gullick - Cleveland
- 1964 - Harley Cooper - Omaha
- 1965 - Larry Charleston - Detroit
- 1966 - Gerald Pate - Milwaukee
- 1967 - Brady Bredzeal - Los Angeles
- 1968 - Leonard Hutchins - Detroit
- 1969 - Dave Mathews - Cleveland
- 1970 - Felton Wood - Grand Rapids
- 1971 - Marvin Johnson - Indianapolis
- 1972 - Verbie Garland - Toledo
- 1973 - D. C. Barker - Rocky Mountain
- 1974 - Robert Stewart - Lowell
- 1975 - Gene Ratliff - Little Rock
- 1976 - Rick Jester - Detroit
- 1977 - Neil Coleman - Virginia
- 1978 - Charles Singleton - Pennsylvania
- 1979 - Lee Roy Murphy - Chicago
- 1980 - Steve Eden - Iowa
- 1981 - Johnny Williams - Chicago
- 1982 - Keith Vining - Detroit
- 1983 - Ricky Womack - Detroit
- 1984 - Evander Holyfield - Knoxville
- 1985 - Donald Stephens - Fort Worth
- 1986 - Harvey Richards - Illinois
- 1987 - Terry McGroom - Chicago
- 1988 - Terry McGroom - Springfield
- 1989 - Terry McGroom - Springfield
- 1990 - Jeremy Williams - Iowa
- 1991 - Jeremy Williams - Detroit
- 1992 - Terry McGroom - Illinois
- 1993 - Benjamin McDowell - Knoxville
- 1994 - Antonio Tarver - Sunshine State
- 1995 - Glenn Robinson - New York metropolitan area
- 1996 - Tim Williamson - Pennsylvania
- 1997 - BJ Flores - Kansas City
- 1998 - Steve Cunningham - Washington
- 1999 - Michael Simms - California
- 2000 - Arthur Palac - Detroit
- 2001 - Chris Arreola - California
- 2002 - Allan Green - Oklahoma
- 2003 - DeAndrey Abron - New Mexico
- 2004 - De'Rae Crane - Iowa
- 2005 - Rommel Rene - Florida
- 2006 - Yathomas Riley - California
- 2007 - Siju Shabazz - Colorado
- 2008 - Derrick Geer - Knoxville
- 2009 - Derrick Geer - Knoxville
- 2010 - Toury Barrows - Michigan
- 2011 - Caleb Plant - Knoxville
- 2012 - Jerry Odom - Washington D.C.
- 2013 - Steven Nelson - Omaha
- 2014 - Malcolm McAllister - Long Beach
- 2015 - Devonte Campbell - Newark
- 2016 - Damion Scarborough - Georgia
- 2017 - Abel Gonzalez - Florida
- 2023 - Julian Delgado - Corpus Christi, Texas
- 2024 - Tyric Trapp - New Jersey
- 2025 - Tyric Trapp - New Jersey
