= DeAndrey Abron =

American boxer (1972–2020)

Personal information
- Born: July 31, 1972 Youngstown, Ohio, U.S.
- Died: March 8, 2020 (aged 47)
- Height: 6 ft 3 in (191 cm)
- Weight: Light heavyweight

Boxing career
- Stance: Orthodox

Boxing record
- Total fights: 25
- Wins: 15
- Win by KO: 10
- Losses: 10

DeAndrey Abron (July 31, 1972 – March 7, 2020) was an American professional boxer who competed from 2004 to 2011 and challenged for the WBO light heavyweight title in 2008. He served in the United States Army and won gold in the All Army/Armed Forces Championship from 1998 to 2003. Abron was team captain for the World Championships in 2001 and was an Olympic Team alternate in 2000.

== Amateur career ==
Abron was the National Amateur Light Heavyweight Champion in 2001 and was also the 2003 National Golden Gloves Light Heavyweight Champion.

== Professional career ==
Abron turned pro in 2004. He challenged Zsolt Erdei for the WBO light heavyweight title in Dresden, Germany, in April 2008, but lost by unanimous decision.

== Death ==
Abron was killed in a car accident on March 7, 2020.

== Professional boxing record ==
| 25 fights | 15 wins | 10 losses |
|---|---|---|
| By knockout | 10 | 5 |
| By decision | 5 | 5 |

| No. | Result | Record | Opponent | Type | Round, time | Date | Location | Notes |
|---|---|---|---|---|---|---|---|---|
| 25 | Loss | 15–10 | Montell Griffin | UD | 8 | Aug 19, 2011 | Horseshoe Casino, Hammond, Indiana, U.S. | |
| 24 | Loss | 15–9 | Michael Seals | UD | 4 | Jun 25, 2011 | Elder Entertainment Center, Decatur, Georgia, U.S. | |
| 23 | Loss | 15–8 | Aleksandr Alekseyev | TKO | 6 (8) | Apr 9, 2011 | Sporthalle, Alsterdorf, Germany | |
| 22 | Loss | 15–7 | Deontay Wilder | TKO | 2 (6), 1:23 | Feb 19, 2011 | Shelton State Community College, Tuscaloosa, Alabama, U.S. | |
| 21 | Loss | 15–6 | Prince Badi Ajamu | UD | 12 | Jul 31, 2009 | Resorts Hotel & Casino, Atlantic City, New Jersey, U.S. | |
| 20 | Loss | 15–5 | Yusaf Mack | TKO | 4 (10), 1:46 | May 20, 2009 | Seminole Hard Rock Hotel and Casino, Hollywood, Florida, U.S. | |
| 19 | Loss | 15–4 | Igor Mikhalkin | TKO | 2 (6), 1:34 | Mar 7, 2009 | Freiberger Arena, Dresden, Germany | |
| 18 | Loss | 15–3 | Valery Brudov | TKO | 7 (10), 1:15 | Nov 27, 2008 | Yubileyny Sports Palace, Saint Petersburg, Russia | |
| 17 | Loss | 15–2 | Zsolt Erdei | UD | 12 | Apr 26, 2008 | Freiberger Arena, Dresden, Germany | For WBO light heavyweight title |
| 16 | Win | 15–1 | Thomas Reid | UD | 8 | Jan 26, 2008 | Fitzgerald's Casino & Hotel, Tunica, Mississippi, U.S. | |
| 15 | Win | 14–1 | Shane Benfield | UD | 12 | Sep 1, 2007 | Fitzgerald's Casino & Hotel, Tunica, Mississippi, U.S. | Won vacant WBO–NABO light heavyweight title |
| 14 | Win | 13–1 | Marvin Hunt | KO | 1 (6), 0:50 | Jul 14, 2007 | Fitzgerald's Casino & Hotel, Tunica, Mississippi, U.S. | |
| 13 | Win | 12–1 | John Turner | TKO | 5 (6), 2:05 | Feb 24, 2007 | Fitzgerald's Casino & Hotel, Tunica, Mississippi, U.S. | |
| 12 | Win | 11–1 | Kippy Warren | KO | 3 (6), 2:06 | Nov 18, 2006 | Fitzgerald's Casino & Hotel, Tunica, Mississippi, U.S. | |
| 11 | Win | 10–1 | Eric Howard | KO | 5 (6), 2:34 | Aug 26, 2006 | Fitzgerald's Casino & Hotel, Tunica, Mississippi, U.S. | |
| 10 | Win | 9–1 | Jose Silva | KO | 1 (4), 2:34 | Jun 16, 2006 | Pepsi Pavilion, Memphis, Tennessee, U.S. | |
| 9 | Win | 8–1 | Manu Ntoh | UD | 6 | May 20, 2006 | Fitzgerald's Casino & Hotel, Tunica, Mississippi, U.S. | |
| 8 | Win | 7–1 | Derek Andrews | KO | 5 (6), 1:20 | Mar 11, 2006 | Fitzgerald's Casino & Hotel, Tunica, Mississippi, U.S. | |
| 7 | Loss | 6–1 | Terry Porter | UD | 6 | Dec 10, 2005 | Fitzgerald's Casino & Hotel, Tunica, Mississippi, U.S. | |
| 6 | Win | 6–0 | James Johnson | UD | 6 | Oct 15, 2005 | Isle of Capri Casino, Lula, Mississippi, U.S. | |
| 5 | Win | 5–0 | James Johnson | TKO | 2 (6), 3:00 | Sep 10, 2005 | Fitzgerald's Casino & Hotel, Tunica, Mississippi, U.S. | |
| 4 | Win | 4–0 | Norman Johnson | UD | 4 | Jul 19, 2005 | Isle of Capri Casino, Lula, Mississippi, U.S. | |
| 3 | Win | 3–0 | Dominique Azeez | TKO | 1 (4), 0:54 | Jun 11, 2005 | Harrah's Hotel & Casino, Kansas City, Missouri, U.S. | |
| 2 | Win | 2–0 | Steve Schneider | TKO | 2 (4), 1:02 | Oct 16, 2004 | Radisson Graystone Castle, Thornton, Colorado, U.S. | |
| 1 | Win | 1–0 | Joe Bouton | TKO | 1 (4), 1:34 | Sep 18, 2004 | Wings Over the Rockies Air and Space Museum, Denver, Colorado, U.S. | |

Sporting positions
Amateur boxing titles
| Previous: Olanda Anderson | U.S. light heavyweight champion 2001 | Next: Curtis Stevens |
| Previous: Allan Green | U.S. Golden Gloves light heavyweight champion 2003 | Next: De'Rae Crane |
Regional boxing titles
| Vacant Title last held by Otis Griffin | WBO–NABO light heavyweight champion 1 Sep 2007 – 26 Apr 2008; Lost bid for world title | Vacant Title next held by Tavoris Cloud |
