= Antonio Tarver =

American boxer

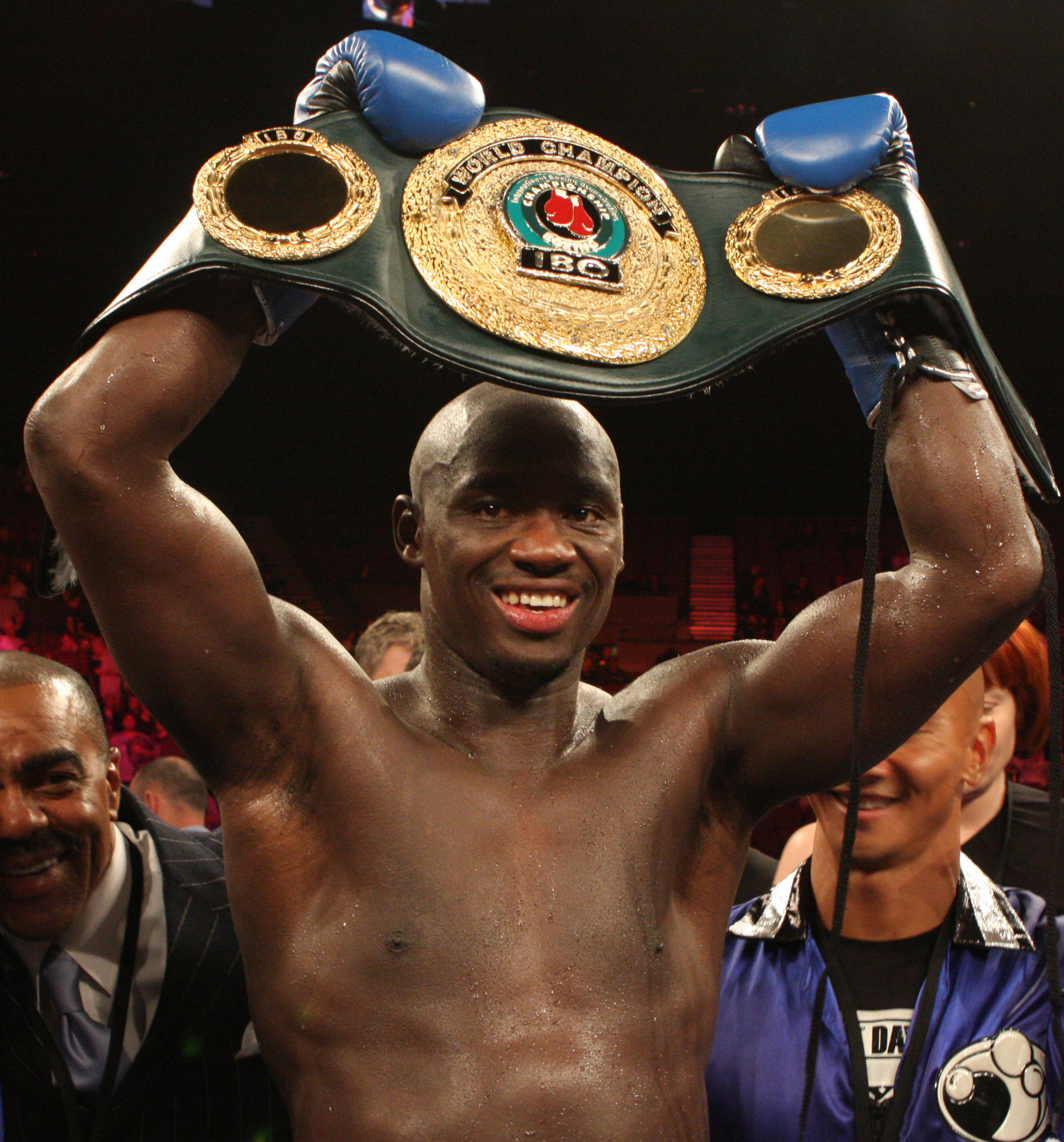
- Tarver with the IBO title, 2011

Personal information
- Nickname: The Magic Man
- Born: Antonio Deon Tarver; November 21, 1968 (age 57) Orlando, Florida, U.S.
- Height: 6 ft 2 in (188 cm)
- Weight: Light heavyweight; Cruiserweight; Heavyweight

Boxing career
- Reach: 75 in (191 cm)
- Stance: Southpaw

Boxing record
- Total fights: 39
- Wins: 31
- Win by KO: 22
- Losses: 6
- Draws: 1
- No contests: 1
Medal record
Men's amateur boxing
Representing United States
Pan American Games
| Gold medal – first place | 1995 Mar del Plata | Light heavyweight |
World Championships
| Gold medal – first place | 1995 Berlin | Light heavyweight |
Olympic Games
| Bronze medal – third place | 1996 Atlanta | Light heavyweight |

Antonio Deon Tarver (born November 21, 1968) is an American former professional boxer and boxing commentator. In boxing, he competed from 1997 to 2015, and held multiple light heavyweight world championships, including the WBA (Unified), WBC, IBF and Ring magazine titles, as well as the IBO light heavyweight and cruiserweight titles. Tarver will be inducted into the International Boxing Hall of Fame in 2026.

As an amateur, Tarver represented the United States at the 1996 Olympics, winning a bronze medal in the light heavyweight division; he eventually lost to Vassiliy Jirov from Kazakhstan, whom he had previously defeated at the 1995 World Championships to win gold. Tarver also triumphed at the 1995 Pan American Games and 1995 U.S. National Championships, winning gold in both. He remains the only boxer in history to have won gold at the Pan Am Games, World Championships and U.S. Nationals all in the same year.

Outside of boxing, Tarver starred as Mason "The Line" Dixon, the heavyweight champion in the 2006 film Rocky Balboa which to date is Tarver’s only acting role.

== Amateur career ==
=== Highlights ===
- 1993 and 1995 United States amateur Light Heavyweight champion.
- 1994 National Golden Gloves Light Heavyweight champion
- Won the Light Heavyweight bronze medal for the United States at the 1996 Olympics in Atlanta. His results were:
- Defeated Dmitry Vybornov (Russia) 5–2
- Defeated David Kowah (Sierra Leone) RSC 1 (2:43)
- Defeated Enrique Flores (Puerto Rico) RSC 3 (1:54)
- Lost to Vassiliy Jirov (Kazakhstan) 9–15

== Professional career ==
=== Early career ===
Tarver made his professional debut at the age of 28 on February 18, 1997, with a second-round knockout of Joaquin Garcia at the legendary "Blue Horizon" in Philadelphia.

Tarver won his first 16 fights, 14 by knockout, before stepping up his level of competition. After taking most of his first 16 fights in either his native Florida or at the "Blue Horizon", for his 11th fight he met veteran Rocky Gannon in Chester, West Virginia, on August 30, 1998. Tarver knocked out Gannon in the second round.

On February 29, 2000, Tarver scored a knockout against Ernest M-16 Mateen in Las Vegas. Later that year, Tarver suffered his first loss when he was knocked down in the 11th round by Eric Harding, en route to a unanimous decision on June 23 in Biloxi, Mississippi. This was an IBF title elimination bout, where the winner would face Roy Jones Jr.

In 2002, Tarver defeated former two-weight world champion Reggie Johnson by split decision to win the NABF & USBA light-heavyweight titles, and a guaranteed title shot at Roy Jones. He then scored a fifth round stoppage over Harding in a rematch that was on the undercard of the rematch between Shane Mosely and Vernon Forrest. Tarver was trailing on the scorecards until the 4th round, when he sent Harding to the canvas with a barrage of unanswered power shots; Harding was also floored twice in the 5th round, leading to the stoppage.

=== First reign as unified light heavyweight champion ===
==== Tarver vs. Griffin ====
On April 26, 2003, Tarver received his first world title shot, when he faced former WBC champion Montel Griffin for the WBC & IBF light-heavyweight titles that had been vacated by Roy Jones Jr., who had gone on to defeat John Ruiz for the WBA heavyweight title the previous month. After dropping Griffin in the first and last rounds, Tarver was crowned champion after winning a unanimous decision.

==== Tarver vs. Jones ====
Next, rather than remain at heavyweight, Jones planned to return to light-heavyweight and regain his belts. Given little chance of winning, Tarver took a weight-drained Jones the distance and lost the fight and WBC title by a majority decision on November 8, 2003, in Las Vegas (Tarver had relinquished the IBF title a few days earlier in anticipation of being unable to make a mandatory defense.)

=== Second reign as unified light heavyweight champion ===
==== Tarver vs. Jones II ====
In a rematch on May 15, 2004, in Las Vegas, Tarver upset the odds to regain the WBC title and win the WBA (Super) title by knocking Jones out in the second round. In fifty previous fights, Jones had only been sent to the floor once, leaving most observers shocked at the result.

Tarver became a mainstream celebrity after his rematch win over Jones, making appearances at late-night shows, appearing on the cover of both Ring and KO Magazine, being spotted by television cameras as a spectator at various boxing fights, and co-hosting ESPN's "Friday Night Fights" for one telecast.

==== Tarver vs. Johnson ====
Later in 2004, the WBC decided to strip Tarver of the world title after he decided against fighting their mandatory challenger, instead choosing to fight IBF title holder Glen Johnson December 18 in Temecula, California; Tarver had already been removed as Super Champion by the WBA in their July rankings. Johnson himself had been stripped of his IBF title before the bout with Tarver for not fighting his mandatory challenger. Both fighters were celebrated for their decision to fight each other rather than bow to the pressure from what has become known as "The Alphabet Soup" sanctioning bodies (WBC, WBA, WBO, and IBF).

=== Third reign as light heavyweight champion ===
==== Tarver vs. Johnson II ====
Tarver, considered a favorite to win the fight, suffered an upset loss to Johnson by way of a split decision in a fight that he did not appear to be in top shape for. Tarver avenged the loss six months later with a unanimous decision, out-boxing and out-working the aggressive Johnson at the FedEx Forum in Memphis, Tennessee to regain The Ring championship.

==== Tarver vs. Jones III ====
In their third fight, Tarver won a unanimous decision over Roy Jones Jr. on October 1, 2005, in Tampa, Florida, almost knocking Jones down in the 11th round but also finding himself in trouble at times during the fight.

==== Tarver vs. Hopkins ====
On June 10, 2006, Tarver faced former undisputed world middleweight champion Bernard Hopkins for Tarver's The Ring title at The Boardwalk Hall in Atlantic City, New Jersey. Hopkins, a 3-to-1 underdog, dominated the fight, outboxing Tarver to win a unanimous decision. The fight was scored 118–109 by all three judges. Tarver was knocked down in the 5th round. Tarver's record would now stand at 24 wins and 4 losses, with 18 wins coming by way of knockout.

=== Fourth reign as light heavyweight champion ===
Tarver returned to the ring nearly one year after his loss to Hopkins, defeating Albanian-fighter Elvir Muriqi on June 9, 2007, by way of a majority decision. In his next fight, held at Foxwoods Resort Casino on December 1, 2007, Tarver registered a win over Danny Santiago by way of a 4th round TKO.

==== Tarver vs. Woods ====
Tarver then regained the IBF title by outpointing Clinton Woods.

==== Tarver vs. Dawson ====
On October 11, 2008, Tarver faced rising star Chad Dawson for Tarver's IBF title. The fight took place at Palms Casino in Las Vegas. Tarver lost the fight via unanimous decision, with wide margins of 118–109 and 117–110 (twice). The outcome was not disputed.

With the loss to Dawson, it was speculated that Tarver may choose to retire; however, he later announced that he and Dawson would meet in a rematch in March 2009.

==== Tarver vs. Dawson II ====
A rematch with Dawson, originally announced for March 14, 2009, had to be postponed due to an injury suffered by Dawson. Finally, on May 9, the two fighters met at the Hard Rock Hotel and Casino, Las Vegas. Tarver, who came to the fight as a 5:1 underdog, again lost by unanimous decision.

=== Heavyweight ===
Following the rematch loss to Dawson, Tarver took over a year off from the ring, before returning on 15 October 2010 to defeat Nagy Aguilera by 10 round unanimous decision in a bout that took place in the heavyweight division. For this fight Tarver officially weighed 221 lbs, some 46 lbs more than he had weighed for the Dawson rematch.

=== Cruiserweight ===
On 20 July 2011, Tarver took on Australian IBO cruiserweight champion Danny Green at the Sydney Entertainment Centre, Sydney, New South Wales, Australia, in Tarver's debut in the 200 lb cruiserweight division.

Tarver dominated the fight, knocking Green down in the second round and controlling the majority of the action from there on in. After taking heavy punishment and being saved by the bell at the end of round 9, Green failed to come out for the start of round 10, allowing Tarver to take the victory and the title by TKO.

=== Retirement ===
On February 25, 2021, it was announced that Tarver would be returning to the ring for the first time since 2015. He was signed to face former UFC Heavyweight Champion Frank Mir in Mir's boxing debut on April 17 on the undercard of Jake Paul vs. Ben Askren. Tarver intended to represent mental health advocacy and has said he would dedicate the bout with Mir to all survivors or victims of mental health disorders. However, On March 23, it was announced that Tarver had withdrawn from the bout after not being cleared by the Georgia Athletic & Entertainment Commission. He was replaced by former IBF cruiserweight champion Steve Cunningham.

== Media ==
=== Rocky Balboa ===
Tarver starred as heavyweight champion Mason "The Line" Dixon in the 2006 film Rocky Balboa. In the film the current, unpopular, champion Dixon fights former champion Rocky Balboa, who decides to come out of retirement. Dixon wins the match by split decision, and after breaking his hand in the second round of the bout but still managing to stand toe to toe with Rocky for the full 10 rounds, proves to doubters that he has the heart of a champion. The DVD of the movie offers an alternate ending, in which Rocky wins the split decision. Dixon's record before the fight is 33-0 (30 KO). Also on the DVD, the film's writer and director Sylvester Stallone wanted to cast a real boxer in the role of Dixon, as he thought it would be easier to teach a boxer how to act than to teach an actor how to box convincingly. Tarver is one of only three fighters to actually defeat "Rocky Balboa" in film.

=== Commentating with Showtime ===
After his loss to Dawson in June 2009, Tarver served as a boxing analyst for Showtime Championship Boxing.

== Professional boxing record ==
| 39 fights | 31 wins | 6 losses |
|---|---|---|
| By knockout | 22 | 0 |
| By decision | 9 | 6 |
| Draws | 1 | |
| No contests | 1 | |

| No. | Result | Record | Opponent | Type | Round, time | Date | Location | Notes |
|---|---|---|---|---|---|---|---|---|
| 39 | Draw | 31–6–1 (1) | Steve Cunningham | SD | 12 | Aug 14, 2015 | Prudential Center, Newark, New Jersey, U.S. | |
| 38 | Win | 31–6 (1) | Johnathon Banks | TKO | 7 (10), 2:25 | Dec 11, 2014 | Pechanga Resort & Casino, Temecula, California, U.S. | |
| 37 | Win | 30–6 (1) | Mike Sheppard | TKO | 4 (10), 1:54 | Nov 26, 2013 | BB&T Center, Sunrise, Florida, U.S. | Won WBA–NABA interim heavyweight title |
| 36 | NC | 29–6 (1) | Lateef Kayode | SD | 12 | Jun 2, 2012 | Home Depot Center, Carson, California, U.S. | IBO cruiserweight title at stake; Originally an SD, later ruled an NC after Tarver failed a drug test |
| 35 | Win | 29–6 | Danny Green | RTD | 9 (12), 3:00 | Jul 20, 2011 | Entertainment Centre, Sydney, Australia | Won IBO cruiserweight title |
| 34 | Win | 28–6 | Nagy Aguilera | UD | 12 | Oct 15, 2010 | Buffalo Run Casino, Miami, Oklahoma, U.S. | |
| 33 | Loss | 27–6 | Chad Dawson | UD | 12 | May 9, 2009 | The Joint, Paradise, Nevada, U.S. | For IBF and IBO light heavyweight titles |
| 32 | Loss | 27–5 | Chad Dawson | UD | 12 | Oct 11, 2008 | Pearl Concert Theater, Paradise, Nevada, U.S. | Lost IBF and IBO light heavyweight titles |
| 31 | Win | 27–4 | Clinton Woods | UD | 12 | Apr 12, 2008 | St. Pete Times Forum, Tampa, Florida, U.S. | Retained IBO light heavyweight title; Won IBF light heavyweight title |
| 30 | Win | 26–4 | Danny Santiago | TKO | 4 (12), 2:53 | Dec 1, 2007 | Foxwoods Resort Casino, Ledyard, Connecticut, U.S. | Retained IBO light heavyweight title |
| 29 | Win | 25–4 | Elvir Muriqi | MD | 12 | Jun 9, 2007 | Convention Center, Hartford, Connecticut, U.S. | Won vacant IBO light heavyweight title |
| 28 | Loss | 24–4 | Bernard Hopkins | UD | 12 | Jun 10, 2006 | Boardwalk Hall, Atlantic City, New Jersey, U.S. | Lost IBO and The Ring light heavyweight titles |
| 27 | Win | 24–3 | Roy Jones Jr. | UD | 12 | Oct 1, 2005 | St. Pete Times Forum, Tampa, Florida, U.S. | Retained IBO and The Ring light heavyweight titles |
| 26 | Win | 23–3 | Glen Johnson | UD | 12 | Jun 18, 2005 | FedExForum, Memphis, Tennessee, U.S. | Won IBO and The Ring light heavyweight titles |
| 25 | Loss | 22–3 | Glen Johnson | SD | 12 | Dec 18, 2004 | Staples Center, Los Angeles, California, U.S. | Lost IBO and The Ring light heavyweight titles |
| 24 | Win | 22–2 | Roy Jones Jr. | TKO | 2 (12), 1:41 | May 15, 2004 | Mandalay Bay Events Center, Paradise, Nevada, U.S. | Won WBA (Unified), WBC, IBO, IBA, The Ring, and inaugural WBF (Foundation) light heavyweight titles |
| 23 | Loss | 21–2 | Roy Jones Jr. | MD | 12 | Nov 8, 2003 | Mandalay Bay Events Center, Paradise, Nevada, U.S. | Lost WBC light heavyweight title; For IBO, The Ring and vacant WBA (Unified) light heavyweight titles |
| 22 | Win | 21–1 | Montell Griffin | UD | 12 | Apr 26, 2003 | Foxwoods Resort Casino, Ledyard, Connecticut, U.S. | Won vacant WBC and IBF light heavyweight titles |
| 21 | Win | 20–1 | Eric Harding | TKO | 5 (12), 0:43 | Jul 20, 2002 | Conseco Fieldhouse, Indianapolis, Indiana, U.S. | |
| 20 | Win | 19–1 | Reggie Johnson | SD | 12 | Jan 25, 2002 | Ramada Plaza O'Hare, Rosemont, Illinois, U.S. | Won WBC–NABF and IBF–USBA light heavyweight titles |
| 19 | Win | 18–1 | Chris Johnson | KO | 10 (10), 1:53 | Aug 3, 2001 | Yakama Legends Casino, Toppenish, Washington, U.S. | |
| 18 | Win | 17–1 | Lincoln Carter | TKO | 5 (10), 1:22 | Feb 24, 2001 | Ice Palace, Tampa, Florida, U.S. | |
| 17 | Loss | 16–1 | Eric Harding | UD | 12 | Jun 23, 2000 | Grand Casino, Biloxi, Mississippi, U.S. | |
| 16 | Win | 16–0 | Ernest Mateen | KO | 1 (10), 0:56 | Feb 29, 2000 | Plaza Hotel & Casino, Paradise, Nevada, U.S. | |
| 15 | Win | 15–0 | Mohamed Benguesmia | TKO | 9 (10), 0:51 | Oct 2, 1999 | Las Vegas Hilton, Winchester, Nevada, U.S. | |
| 14 | Win | 14–0 | Jerry Williams | TKO | 5 (10) | Jun 12, 1999 | Aleppo Shriners Auditorium, Wilmington, Massachusetts, U.S. | |
| 13 | Win | 13–0 | Roy Francis | TKO | 3 (10) | Mar 27, 1999 | Jai-Alai Fronton, Miami, Florida, U.S. | |
| 12 | Win | 12–0 | John Williams | KO | 4 (12), 0:42 | Feb 5, 1999 | Jai-Alai Fronton, Miami, Florida, U.S. | |
| 11 | Win | 11–0 | Rocky Gannon | TKO | 2 (10), 2:28 | Aug 30, 1998 | Mountaineer Casino Racetrack and Resort, Chester, West Virginia, U.S. | |
| 10 | Win | 10–0 | Jose Luis Rivera | RTD | 4 (10), 3:00 | Jun 23, 1998 | The Blue Horizon, Philadelphia, Pennsylvania, U.S. | |
| 9 | Win | 9–0 | Charles Oliver | UD | 8 | Mar 24, 1998 | Grand Casino, Tunica, Mississippi, U.S. | |
| 8 | Win | 8–0 | Boyer Chew | TKO | 7 (8), 2:17 | Jan 17, 1998 | Boardwalk Hall, Atlantic City, New Jersey, U.S. | |
| 7 | Win | 7–0 | Roy Francis | TKO | 2 (6), 2:03 | Dec 2, 1997 | The Blue Horizon, Philadelphia, Pennsylvania, U.S. | |
| 6 | Win | 6–0 | Benito Fernandez | TKO | 3 (6) | Oct 28, 1997 | The Blue Horizon, Philadelphia, Pennsylvania, U.S. | |
| 5 | Win | 5–0 | Berry Butler | UD | 6 | Oct 4, 1997 | Circus Maximus Showroom, Atlantic City, New Jersey, U.S. | |
| 4 | Win | 4–0 | Shelby Gross | TKO | 1 (4), 2:59 | Aug 12, 1997 | The Blue Horizon, Philadelphia, Pennsylvania, U.S. | |
| 3 | Win | 3–0 | Tracy Barrios | TKO | 3 (6) | Jun 21, 1997 | Sun Dome, Tampa, Florida, U.S. | |
| 2 | Win | 2–0 | Jason Burrell | TKO | 3 (4), 0:22 | Apr 29, 1997 | The Blue Horizon, Philadelphia, Pennsylvania, U.S. | |
| 1 | Win | 1–0 | Joaquin Garcia | TKO | 2 (4), 2:01 | Feb 18, 1997 | The Blue Horizon, Philadelphia, Pennsylvania, U.S. | |

Sporting positions
Amateur boxing titles
| Previous: Montell Griffin | U.S. light heavyweight champion 1993 | Next: Benjamin McDowell |
| Previous: Benjamin McDowell | U.S. Golden Gloves light heavyweight champion 1994 | Next: Glenn Robinson |
| Previous: Benjamin McDowell | U.S. light heavyweight champion 1995 | Next: Anthony Stewart |
Regional boxing titles
| Preceded by Reggie Johnson | NABF light heavyweight champion January 25, 2002 – July 2002; Vacated | Vacant Title next held by Montell Griffin |
| Preceded by Reggie Johnson | USBA light heavyweight champion January 25, 2002 – July 2002; Vacated | Vacant Title next held by Glen Johnson |
| Vacant Title last held by Fres Oquendo | WBA–NABA heavyweight champion Interim title November 26, 2013 – December 2014; Vacated | Vacant Title next held by Jarrell Miller |
Minor world boxing titles
| Preceded by Roy Jones Jr. | IBO light heavyweight champion May 15, 2004 – December 18, 2004 | Succeeded by Glen Johnson |
| Preceded by Roy Jones Jr. | IBA light heavyweight champion May 15, 2004 – December 2004; Vacated | Vacant Title next held by Glen Johnson |
| Inaugural champion | WBF (Foundation) light heavyweight champion May 15, 2004 – December 2004; Vacated | Vacant Title next held by Dawid Kostecki |
| Preceded by Glen Johnson | IBO light heavyweight champion June 18, 2005 – June 10, 2006 | Succeeded by Bernard Hopkins |
| Vacant Title last held by Bernard Hopkins | IBO light heavyweight champion June 9, 2007 – October 11, 2008 | Succeeded by Chad Dawson |
| Preceded by Danny Green | IBO cruiserweight champion July 20, 2011 – September 2012; Stripped | Vacant Title next held by Danny Green |
Major world boxing titles
| Vacant Title last held by Roy Jones Jr. | WBC light heavyweight champion April 26, 2003 – November 8, 2003 | Succeeded by Roy Jones Jr. |
| Vacant Title last held by Roy Jones Jr. | IBF light heavyweight champion April 26, 2003 – October 31, 2003; Vacated | Vacant Title next held by Glen Johnson |
| Preceded by Roy Jones Jr. | WBA light heavyweight champion Unified title May 15, 2004 – July 1, 2004; Stripped | Vacant |
| Preceded by Roy Jones Jr. | WBC light heavyweight champion May 15, 2004 – November 4, 2004; Vacated | Vacant Title next held by Tomasz Adamek |
| Preceded by Roy Jones Jr. | The Ring light heavyweight champion May 15, 2004 – December 18, 2004 | Succeeded by Glen Johnson |
| Preceded by Glen Johnson | The Ring light heavyweight champion June 18, 2005 – June 10, 2006 | Succeeded by Bernard Hopkins |
| Preceded by Clinton Woods | IBF light heavyweight champion April 12, 2008 – October 11, 2008 | Succeeded by Chad Dawson |
Awards
| Previous: Roy Jones Jr. | Best Boxer ESPY Award; 2004 | Next: Bernard Hopkins |
| Previous: Rocky Juarez; KO10 Antonio Diaz | The Ring Knockout of the Year; KO2 Roy Jones Jr. 2004 | Next: Allan Green; KO1 Jaidon Codrington |
