= Henry Lamar (American football) =

American football coach, boxing coach and executive

Biographical details
- Born: January 26, 1906; Oxford, Mississippi, U.S.
- Died: September 28, 1985 (aged 79); Marlboro, Massachusetts, U.S.
- Education: University of Virginia

Coaching career (HC unless noted)

Football
- 1934–1942: Harvard (assistant/freshmen)
- 1943–1944: Harvard
- 1945–1971: Harvard (freshmen)

Boxing
- 1932–1937: Harvard

Head coaching record
- Overall: 7–3–1 (football)

Henry Nicholson Lamar (January 26, 1906 – September 28, 1985) was an American college boxing coach, college football coach, and professional boxing executive. He served as the head football coach at Harvard University in 1943 and 1944. Lamar also served as the Harvard boxing coach and freshman football coach.

== Early life ==
Lamar was born in Oxford, Mississippi, and raised in Washington, D.C., by government employee Lucius Lamar and his wife Atala. He was a great-grandson of Mississippi jurist Lucius Quintus Cincinnatus Lamar II and a relative of Mirabeau B. Lamar, the second president of the Republic of Texas. Lamar attended Western High School in Washington, where he began his successful career as a boxer. As a senior, he won the national amateur light heavyweight championship at the Boston Garden in 1925, and successfully defended the title the following year. He made his professional boxing debut in Boston in August 1926. Lamar also won the Pan-American light heavyweight championship.

Lamar attended the University of Virginia, from which he graduated in 1929. Around that time, he married his wife, Juanita (née Galvin), with whom he had two daughters. Lamar boxed professionally until 1930 when he lost a match to Jim Maloney at Braves Field. After the bout, he said, "That's enough. I'm never going to be a champion ... this is a good time to get out." It was his only loss in 39 bouts as a professional fighter.

== Coaching career ==
Lamar joined the athletic department at Harvard University in 1931, initially intending "just to help out for a few weeks", but he remained at the school as a boxing and football coach for four decades. He became the head boxing coach in 1932 after many students had successfully petitioned for the introduction of the sport in 1929 and 1930. He remained coach after the sport, which had been adopted on a trial basis, was reduced to intramural level in 1937. Fans and sportswriters called Lamar "the gentleman coach of Harvard boxing".

In 1934, Lamar was named the line coach of the Harvard football team. In a surprising selection the following season, head coach Dick Harlow selected Lamar as Crimson's ends coach. The Boston Globe noted Lamar was previously "a very inconspicuous member of the Harvard Athletic Association's organization." During his tenure at the university, he coached the four Kennedy brothers: Joseph, John, Robert, and Edward, all of whom played as ends on the football team.

During World War II, Harvard football coach Dick Harlow spent 30 months in the United States Navy, during which time Lamar served as the team's mentor for the 1943 and 1944 seasons. He compiled a 7–3–1 record. In the late 1940s, he coached Harvard's junior varsity football team.

In 1947, Lamar was appointed chairman of the Massachusetts Boxing Commission. In that post, he attempted to reform the sport in the state, including through a review of all licenses and the mandatory screening of fighters for brain damage. Lamar also courted controversy, for example, by suspending Sugar Ray Robinson for walking out on a fight and by withdrawing the state from the National Boxing Association.

Lamar retired from coaching at Harvard in June 1972. Following his retirement, Harvard created the Henry N. Lamar Award, for which a gold pocket watch is presented to "that senior member of the Harvard football squad who, through his dedication to the program and concern for his fellow man, has made a unique contribution to Harvard football."

After a brief illness, he died of cancer in a Marlboro, Massachusetts hospital on September 28, 1985. He was 79 years old.

== Head coaching record ==
=== Football ===
Year	Team	Overall	Conference	Standing	Bowl/playoffs
Harvard Crimson (Independent) (1943–1944)
1943	Harvard	2–2–1			
1944	Harvard	5–1			
Harvard:		7–3–1			
Total:		7–3–1			
