= Terry McGroom =

American boxer

Personal information
- Nationality: American
- Born: March 16, 1966 Chicago, Illinois, U.S.
- Died: April 17, 2016 (aged 50)
- Height: 6 ft 1 in (1.85 m)
- Weight: Heavyweight; Cruiserweight

Boxing career
- Reach: 77 in (196 cm)
- Stance: Orthodox

Boxing record
- Total fights: 31
- Wins: 19
- Win by KO: 10
- Losses: 9
- Draws: 3
- No contests: 0

Terry McGroom (March 16, 1966 – April 17, 2016) was an American professional boxer who competed from 1993 to 2004. He challenged for the IBF cruiserweight title in 2001.

== Early life ==
McGroom attended Wells High School in Chicago, which was "full of gangbangers." Tom O'Shea, an English teacher at the school, said he was "an arrogant, nasty kid who was always in trouble with his teachers," apart from the fact that he did not earn a single credit in his freshman year. When O'Shea caught McGroom fighting in the hallways, he was given a choice: follow him to the principal's office or to the boxing gym. O'Shea became his coach, a position he held throughout McGroom's amateur career.

He later graduated from Wells as an honor student, earning a boxing scholarship to Northern Michigan University.

== Amateur career ==
McGroom had a stellar amateur career prior to turning professional, going 63-11. He was a National Golden Gloves Light Heavyweight champion in 1987, 1988, 1989, and 1992 and a National Amateur Light Heavyweight Champion in 1991. McGroom also won a silver medal from the 1990 Goodwill Games in the 81 kg division.

He also competed at the 1989 World Championships in Moscow.

== Professional career ==
McGroom turned pro in 1993 and started off his career going undefeated in his first 11 fights. He then faced Darrol Wilson, a heavy hitting heavyweight who would make a name for himself later on, in 1995, and battled his way to a 10-round draw. McGroom's next big fight was an 8th-round TKO loss to future contender Kirk Johnson. Johnson was much bigger than McGroom and slugged him to the canvas.

After the loss to Johnson, McGroom's impressive victory over Esteban Pizzarro in 1999 earned him the biggest fight of his career against James Toney in 2000. It was a close fight with Toney and some thought the decision should have been given to McGroom. In 2001 he challenged Vasily Jirov for his IBF Cruiserweight belt. The result was a shocking one-round KO for Jirov, the result from one well place body shot.

McGroom then moved up to Heavyweight and had little success. He lost to future contenders Dominick Guinn, Malik Scott, and Timor Ibragimov before retiring in 2004.

== Personal life ==
McGroom died of bone cancer on April 17, 2016. Shortly before his death, he trained professional cruiserweight boxer Craig "Pressure" Parker.

== Professional boxing record ==
19 Wins (10 knockouts, 9 decisions), 9 Losses (4 knockouts, 5 decisions), 3 Draws
Result	Record	Opponent	Type	Round	Date	Location	Notes
Loss	19–9–3	(Germany) Cengiz Koc	UD	6	24/07/2004	Frankfurt, Germany	
Loss	19–8–3	(Uzbekistan) Timur Ibragimov	UD	8	22/04/2004	Moscow, Russia	
Loss	19–7–3	(Denmark) Johny Jensen	SD	6	28/02/2004	Aalborg, Denmark	
Draw	19–6–3	(Denmark) Johny Jensen	PTS	6	24/10/2003	Copenhagen, Denmark	
Loss	19–6–2	(United States) Steve Cunningham	UD	8	20/09/2003	(United States) Uncasville, Connecticut, U.S.	
Loss	19–5–2	(United States) Malik Scott	TKO	2	01/02/2003	(United States) Uncasville, Connecticut, U.S.	Referee stopped the bout at 2:58 of the second round.
Loss	19–4–2	(United States) Dominick Guinn	TKO	7	08/09/2002	(United States) Lawton, Oklahoma, U.S.	
Loss	19–3–2	(Kazakhstan) Vassiliy Jirov	KO	1	24 Mar 2001	(United States) Las Vegas, Nevada, U.S.	For IBF cruiserweight title. McGroom knocked out at 1:22 of the first round.
Win	19–2–2	(United States) Ed Strickland	KO	1	21/02/2001	(United States) Indianapolis, Indiana, U.S.	Strickland knocked out at 2:59 of the first round.
Loss	18–2–2	(United States) James Toney	MD	10	21/01/2000	(United States) Chicago, Illinois, U.S.	
Win	18–1–2	(Puerto Rico) Esteban Pizzarro	UD	12	26/06/1999	(United States) Cicero, Illinois, U.S.	Won WBO–NABO cruiserweight title
Win	17–1–2	(United States) Jesse Corona	UD	10	05/03/1999	(United States) Chicago, Illinois, U.S.	
Win	16–1–2	(United States) Vinson Durham	UD	10	29/01/1999	(United States) Chicago, Illinois, U.S.	
Win	15–1–2	(United States) Mike Acklie	TKO	2	13/11/1998	(United States) Chicago, Illinois, U.S.	Referee stopped the bout at 0:50 of the second round.
Win	14–1–2	(United States) Brian Yates	UD	6	01/10/1997	(United States) Chicago, Illinois, U.S.	
Loss	13–1–2	(Canada) Kirk Johnson	TKO	8	16/11/1996	(United States) Atlantic City, New Jersey, U.S.	
Draw	13–0–2	(United States) Anthony Hembrick	PTS	10	23/04/1996	(United States) Auburn Hills, Michigan, U.S.	
Win	13–0–1	(United States) Arthur Saribekian	UD	8	21/11/1995	(United States) Auburn Hills, Michigan, U.S.	
Win	12–0–1	(United States) Ron Preston	UD	8	03/10/1995	(United States) Flint, Michigan, U.S.	
Draw	11–0–1	(United States) Darroll Wilson	PTS	10	17/08/1995	(United States) Atlantic City, New Jersey, U.S.	
Win	11–0	(United States) Exum Speight	TKO	2	28/03/1995	(United States) Flint, Michigan, U.S.	
Win	10–0	(United States) Ken Jackson	TKO	2	20/08/1994	(United States) Athens, Tennessee, U.S.	
Win	9–0	(United States) Randy McGee	UD	8	21/05/1994	(United States) Knoxville, Tennessee, U.S.	
Win	8–0	(United States) Tim St Clair	UD	8	05/02/1994	(United States) Knoxville, Tennessee, U.S.	
Win	7–0	Morris Young	TKO	4	18/12/1993	(United States) Knoxville, Tennessee, U.S.	
Win	6–0	(United States) Aaron Green	KO	4	13/11/1993	(United States) Knoxville, Tennessee, U.S.	
Win	5–0	(United States) Leonard Lamar Long	PTS	6	28/08/1993	(United States) Knoxville, Tennessee, U.S.	
Win	4–0	(United States) Darren Jewell	KO	2	17/07/1993	(United States) Knoxville, Tennessee, U.S.	
Win	3–0	Ricardo Estrada	TKO	3	12/06/1993	(United States) Knoxville, Tennessee, U.S.	
Win	2–0	Donald Johnson	TKO	2	27/03/1993	(United States) Knoxville, Tennessee, U.S.	
Win	1–0	William Yates	TKO	1	16/01/1993	(United States) Knoxville, Tennessee, U.S.	
