= Eric Harding =

American boxer

Personal information
- Nickname: Magic 2000
- Born: December 20, 1972 (age 53) Philadelphia, Pennsylvania, U.S.
- Height: 6 ft 1 in (185 cm)
- Weight: Light heavyweight

Boxing career
- Reach: 77 in (196 cm)
- Stance: Southpaw

Boxing record
- Total fights: 28
- Wins: 23
- Win by KO: 7
- Losses: 4
- Draws: 1

Eric Harding (born December 20, 1972) is an American former professional boxer who fought at light heavyweight.

== Career ==
Harding turned pro in 1991 and was undefeated in his first 20 fights. These wins included a fight in which he defeated future champion Montell Griffin by split decision to win the NABF light heavyweight title on Nov 13, 1998, and a unanimous decision over then undefeated contender Antonio Tarver on June 23, 2000.

His streak came to an end when he fought Roy Jones Jr. for the WBC, WBA, & IBF light heavyweight titles on Sept. 9, 2000. He lost by technical knockout (the fight was stopped after the 10th round by the ringside doctor due to Harding suffering from a torn biceps muscle), but after the fight Jones Jr. said it was his most difficult fight to date.

On Feb. 11, 2005 he defeated David Telesco to claim the vacant USBA light heavyweight title, but lost the title the following year to Chad Dawson by decision, despite dropping Dawson in the 1st round.

== Professional boxing record ==
23 Wins (7 knockouts, 16 decisions), 4 Losses (2 knockouts, 2 decisions), 1 Draw
Result	Record	Opponent	Type	Round, Time	Date	Location	Notes
Loss	21-0	(United States) Chad Dawson	UD	12	2006-06-02	(United States) Chumash Casino, Santa Ynez, California	WBC NABF Light Heavyweight Title.
Win	20-0-3	(United States) Daniel Judah	UD	12	2005-10-21	(United States) Mohegan Sun, Uncasville, Connecticut	WBC NABF Light Heavyweight Title.
Win	29-5-1	(United States) David Telesco	UD	12	2005-02-11	(United States) Mohegan Sun, Uncasville, Connecticut	IBF USBA Light Heavyweight Title.
Loss	38-9-1	(Jamaica) Glen Johnson	UD	12	2003-05-18	(United States) Jimmy's Bronx Cafe, Bronx, New York	IBF USBA Light Heavyweight Title.
Loss	19-1	(United States) Antonio Tarver	TKO	5 (10), 0:43	Jul 20, 2002	(United States) Conseco Fieldhouse, Indianapolis, Indiana	Referee stopped the bout at 0:43 of the fifth round.
Win	16-0	(United States) George Khalid Jones	TKO	7 (10), 0:53	2001-12-14	(United States) Mohegan Sun, Uncasville, Connecticut	Referee stopped the bout at 0:53 of the seventh round.
Win	20-5-1	(United States) Demetrius Jenkins	UD	10	2001-06-29	(United States) Grand Casino Gulfport, Gulfport, Mississippi	
Loss	42-1	(United States) Roy Jones Jr.	RTD	10 (12), 3:00	2000-09-09	(United States) New Orleans Arena, New Orleans, Louisiana	WBC/WBA/IBF/IBO Light Heavyweight Titles. Harding did not come out for the 11th round.
Win	16-0	(United States) Antonio Tarver	UD	12	2000-06-23	(United States) Grand Casino Biloxi, Biloxi, Mississippi	
Win	6-4-3	(United States) Leon A. Gray	KO	7 (10)	1999-11-05	(United States) Pechanga Resort and Casino, Temecula, California	
Win	18-3-1	(United States) Ray Berry	UD	10	1999-10-08	(United States) Hauppauge, New York	
Win	9-6	(Guyana) Pascal David	TKO	6 (?)	1999-05-16	(United States) Eastwood Theatre, Hartford, Connecticut	
Win	34-1	(United States) Montell Griffin	SD	12	1998-11-13	(United States) Miccosukee Resort and Gaming, Miami, Florida	WBC NABF Light Heavyweight Title.
Win	9-4	(United States) Dave Hamilton	TKO	2 (10)	1998-08-02	(United States) Fleet Center, Boston, Massachusetts	
Win	9-3-1	(United States) Levan Easley	UD	6	1998-04-14	(United States) Foxwoods, Mashantucket, Connecticut	
Win	5-2	(Jamaica) Richard Grant	PTS	8	1997-12-18	(United States) Dressler Arena, Hartford, Connecticut	
Win	5-4-1	(United States) Steve Detar	UD	8	1997-11-01	(United States) Foxwoods, Mashantucket, Connecticut	
Win	5-0	(Egypt) Kabary Salem	UD	6	1997-08-29	(United States) Saratoga Performing Arts Center, Saratoga Springs, New York	
Win	10-2-2	(United States) Beethaeven Scottland	PTS	8	1997-06-29	(United States) Dressler Arena, Hartford, Connecticut	
Win	5-1-3	(Puerto Rico) Hector Sanjurjo	PTS	6	1997-02-20	(United States) Foxwoods, Mashantucket, Connecticut	
Win	10-1-2	(United States) Beethaeven Scottland	UD	4	1997-01-10	(United States) Mohegan Sun, Uncasville, Connecticut	
Win	6-1	(United States) Ed Bryant	UD	6	1995-12-08	(United States) Foxwoods, Mashantucket, Connecticut	
Win	1-2	(Puerto Rico) Roberto Perez	TKO	3 (?)	1995-10-03	(United States) Foxwoods, Mashantucket, Connecticut	
Win	4-0-1	(Ghana) Junior Neequaye	PTS	6	1995-08-17	(United States) Caesars Atlantic City, Atlantic City, New Jersey	
Win	5-0-1	(United States) Pat Pernsley	UD	4	1995-06-06	(United States) The Blue Horizon, Philadelphia, Pennsylvania	
Win	0-2	(United States) Reinaldo Almodovar	KO	1 (4)	1995-02-10	(United States) The Blue Horizon, Philadelphia, Pennsylvania	
Win	--	(United States) Jermain Dixon	KO	1 (?)	1991-09-27	(United States) The Blue Horizon, Philadelphia, Pennsylvania	
Win	9-41-2	(United States) Robert Thomas	PTS	4	1991-08-28	(United States) Philadelphia, Pennsylvania	
