= Montell Griffin vs. Roy Jones Jr. II =

Boxing competition

Unfinished Business
- Date: August 7, 1997
- Venue: Foxwoods Resort Casino, Ledyard, Connecticut, U.S.
- Title(s) on the line: WBC light heavyweight title

Tale of the tape
Boxer	Montell Griffin	Roy Jones Jr.
Nickname	"Ice"	"Junior"
Hometown	Chicago, Illinois, U.S.	Pensacola, Florida, U.S.
Purse	$1,500,000	$1,500,000
Pre-fight record	27–0 (18 KO)	34–1 (29 KO)
Age	27 years, 2 months	28 years, 6 months
Height	5 ft 7 in (170 cm)	5 ft 11 in (180 cm)
Weight	174 lb (79 kg)	175 lb (79 kg)
Style	Orthodox	Orthodox
Recognition	WBC; Light Heavyweight Champion	WBC; No. 1 Ranked Light Heavyweight; The Ring No. 2 ranked pound-for-pound fighter 3-division world champion

Result
- Jones Jr. wins via 1st-round KO

Montell Griffin vs. Roy Jones Jr. II, billed as Unfinished Business, was a professional boxing match contested on August 7, 1997 for the WBC light heavyweight championship.

== Background ==
Jones and Griffin had previously fought earlier in 1997 on March 21. Jones, who was the number one ranked pound-for-pound fighter in all of boxing, was making the first defense of the WBC light heavyweight title he had won on November 22, 1996 after defeating Mike McCallum against the undefeated Montell Griffin, who held the WBU light heavyweight title and was the top ranked light heavyweight by the WBC. Griffin was able to control the early portion of the fight, but Jones eventually rebounded and took control of the latter portion of the bout. The fight was still close entering round nine, as Jones took a narrow lead on two of the judge's scorecards (77–75 and 76–75), while Griffin held a 76–75 lead on the third. Griffin would control most of the first two minutes, but Jones was able to hurt Griffin with a right hand as the second minute ended. Jones then attacked Griffin in hopes of scoring a knockout victory, causing Griffin to voluntarily take a knee to avoid further punishment. While Griffin was on his knee, however, Jones illegally hit Griffin with a right-left combination. Jones initially thought he had picked up the victory via knockout, but referee Tony Perez announced that he had disqualified Jones for the illegal blows and Griffin was awarded the victory by disqualification, becoming the new WBC light heavyweight champion and the first person to defeat Jones as a professional. Griffin originally talked of a unification match with then-WBA and IBF light heavyweight champion Virgil Hill, but agreed to a rematch with Jones instead.

== The fight ==
Though their first fight was closely contested through nine rounds, the rematch would last only 151 seconds. Less than 20 seconds into the fight, Jones sent Griffin down into the ropes with a left hook for an official knockdown. Following the knockdown, Jones stalked towards Griffin, constantly attacking him with power punches. Griffin attempted to keep Jones at bay with his jab but was unable to establish himself as he had in the previous fight. Then with around 42 seconds left in the round, Jones caught Griffin flush with a leaping left hook that put Griffin down on his back. Griffin attempted to get back up but was unable to find to his footing and was counted at the 2:31 mark of the first round. Jones was then declared the winner by knockout, once again becoming the WBC light heavyweight champion.

== Aftermath ==
Following his victory Jones Jr was linked to his WBC mandatory Michael Nunn. However in November 1997 he vacated his belt to move up to heavyweight with a $6,000,000 deal to face former undisputed champion Buster Douglas on the table. Ultimately however Jones's father convinced him to stay at light heavyweight, telling him he was "risking his life" by fighting Douglas. Instead Jones signed to fight former light heavyweight champion Virgil Hill.

== Undercard ==
Confirmed bouts:

== Broadcasting ==
Country	Broadcaster
United States	HBO

Preceded by First Bout	Montell Griffin's bouts 7 August 1997	Succeeded by vs. Vinson Durham
Preceded by First Bout	Roy Jones Jr.'s bouts 7 August 1997	Succeeded by vs. Virgil Hill
