= Jerry Odom (boxer) =

American boxer

Jerry "2 Tickets 2 Paradise" Odom is an American super middleweight professional boxer from Washington, D.C.

== Family ==
Odom was raised in the Paradise Projects, one of the roughest neighborhoods in Washington, D.C. After getting into trouble as a youth for fighting, he eventually found his way to the boxing gym, where he excelled as an amateur.

== Career ==
Odom was a decorated amateur, winning the National Golden Gloves championship at 178 lbs. in 2012 after finishing as runner up the previous year. For his accomplishments, Odom was named 2012 Amateur Boxer of the Year by Stiff Jab.

Odom turned professional in October 2012 at George Mason University's Patriot Center, where he stopped Darryl Fields in the first round. He has since fought five times as a professional, with none of his opponents making it out of the first round. Odom has since signed with GH3 Promotions based in Newark, N.J.
