= Wladimir Klitschko vs. Samuel Peter =

Boxing Match

Boardwalk Brawls
- Date: 24 September 2005
- Venue: Boardwalk Hall, Atlantic City, New Jersey, US
- Title(s) on the line: IBF/WBO Heavyweight Title Eliminator

Tale of the tape
Boxer	(Ukraine) Wladimir Klitschko	(Nigeria) Samuel Peter
Nickname	"Dr. Steelhammer"	"The Nigerian Nightmare"
Hometown	Kyiv, Kyiv Oblast, Ukraine	Akwa Ibom, Nigeria
Pre-fight record	44–3 (39 KO)	24–0 (21 KO)
Age	29 years, 5 months	25 years
Height	6 ft 6 in (198 cm)	6 ft 2 in (188 cm)
Weight	244 lb (111 kg)	243 lb (110 kg)
Style	Orthodox	Orthodox
Recognition	WBA/IBF/WBO; No. 2 Ranked Heavyweight; The Ring; No. 9 Ranked Heavyweight	WBC/IBF/WBO; No. 3 Ranked Heavyweight; WBA/The Ring; No. 8 Ranked Heavyweight; NABF; Heavyweight Champion

Result
- Klitschko defeated Peter via Unanimous Decision

Wladimir Klitschko vs. Samuel Peter, billed as "Boardwalk Brawls", was a professional boxing match contested on 24 September 2005.

== Background ==
Since his upset stoppage loss at the hands of Lamon Brewster, Wladimir Klitschko had secured two stoppage victories, first a split technical decision over DaVarryl Williamson and the second a 4th-round TKO over Eliseo Castillo. Despite this, many observers continued to question both Wladimir's chin and his stamina, as a result of the nature of his three losses to Ross Puritty, Corrie Sanders and Brewster.

Meanwhile, Samuel Peter was rising quickly through the heavyweight ranks, being ranked inside the top 10 by all the major sanctioning bodies, with his build and punching power drawing comparisons to Mike Tyson. Indeed, when he interviewed by ESPN in June 2005, shortly before his final fight against Kevin McBride, Tyson would name Peter as one of his favourite fighters from the newest crop of heavyweights. However, his record was criticised for the lack of notable opposition, and he had been described as slow, sloppy and predictable.

On the 3 August 2005 the match up between Klitschko and Peter was confirmed. It would be an eliminator for the IBF and WBO belts held by Chris Byrd and Brewster (both former Klitschko opponents), in addition Peter's NABF and the vacant NABO titles were on the line. Speaking at the New York press conference on 10 August, Peter told the assembled reporters, "I’m coming to do what I do. I’m a specialist. I’m a knockout specialist." Klitschko's trainer, Emanuel Steward predicted that his man would be the one to finish the fight early, "I predict he will knock out Sam Peter between the third and seventh round, he’s a seasoned professional fighter against an aggressive green fighter." Veteran trainer Angelo Dundee predicted an early Peter knockout, saying "You can't train a chin". It had been reported that many within the Klitschko camp didn't want to take the fight, but that Wladimir insisted that he wanted to face Peter.

Most expected the bout to end in a knockout, given the question marks over Klitschko's stamina and the feeling that Peter would be unable to outbox Wladimir. Peter was a 7 to 5 favourite entering the ring.

== The fights ==
=== Cotto vs. Torres ===
In the chief support Miguel Cotto defended his WBO Light Welterweight belt against Ricardo Torres, who was a last minute replacement for Gianluca Branco.

Cotto knocked down Torres with a left hook in the first round, before being hurt himself with a right hand later in the round. Cotto was knocked down for first time in his career the second round. In the fourth round, Torres took a knee following a body shot, but he would hurt Cotto with a right-left combination in the next round. Cotto dropped Torres against with a right hand toward the end of the sixth, before connecting with a right-left combination in the seventh which ended the bout, giving Cotto a KO victory.

=== Main Event ===
Klitschko spent much of the fight working behind jab, landing the occasional right hand and moving away from the advancing Peter. Klitschko would initiate a number of clinches, to keep Peter from finding a rhythm. In the fifth round a clubbing right hand to the back of Klitschko's head sent him down, he beat the count but was down again 30 seconds later from a half punch half push that referee Randy Neumann ruled a knockdown. Klitschko would survive the round and over the next few round would use his jab and straight right to attempt to slow the oncoming Peter, who continued to search for a knockout punch. A solid right hand, rocked Klitschko in the eight, and in the tenth a right hook sent him staggering across the ring before a straight right hand sent him down for the third time. Klitschko again beat the count and withstood Peter's follow up attacks until the end of round. Peter, his eyes swelling, wobbled Klitschko with a wild left hand early in the final round but a left hook from Wladimir hurt Peter. The fight went to the judges, all three of whom would score the bout 114–111 in favour of Klitschko. HBO's unofficial scorer Harold Lederman also had it 114-111 for Klitschko.

According to CompuBox Klitschko landed 204 punches with 39% accuracy, against Peter's 100 punches with 23% accuracy.

== Aftermath ==
Speaking after the bout Klitschko said "I have put my losses behind me, Boxing is a lot of fun, simple as that. I am ready to fight anyone. Peter was a very strong opponent, but he kept hitting me in the back of the head. It's wonderful to be back in the heavyweight picture. Hopefully, I convinced some of the critics that I have the stamina to go 12 rounds." Meanwhile, Peter said "I took his best punch and knocked him down three times, I came to win but he did his best and he beat me. He beat me today, but maybe on my best day I can beat him. I learned from the experience of being in with a top opponent for the first time."

Klitschko received praised for his performance, showing both heart and stamina to overcome being knocked down three times. Despite the loss Peter exhibited a strong chin, and despite appearing somewhat fatigated late on, he was nevertheless able to last the full 12 rounds (having only gone 10 rounds previously). He was however criticised for appearing to be somewhat one-dimensional.

The following February it was confirmed that Klitschko would challenge Byrd for the IBF title in April. He would stop him in the 7th to become a heavyweight champion. Peter would bounce back with wins over Robert Hawkins and Julius Long before he would face James Toney in a WBC title eliminator in September 2006.

This would be Wladimir's last bout without a world title on the line.

== Undercard ==
Confirmed bouts:

== Broadcasting ==
Country	Broadcaster
Germany	ARD
United States	HBO

Preceded by vs. Eliseo Castillo	Wladimir Klitschko's bouts 24 September 2005	Succeeded by vs. Chris Byrd II
Preceded by vs. Taurus Sykes	Samuel Peter's bouts 24 September 2005	Succeeded by vs. Robert Hawkins
