= Michael Marrone =

Michael Marrone may refer to:

- Mike Marrone, American heavyweight boxer
- Michael Marrone (soccer), Australian association football defender
