= Seth Mitchell =

American boxer (born 1982)

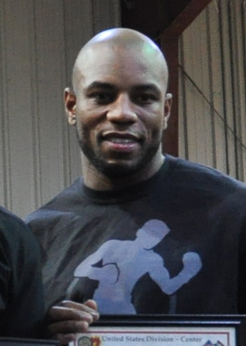
- Mitchell in 2011

Personal information
- Nickname: Mayhem
- Nationality: American
- Born: May 29, 1982 (age 44) Brandywine, Maryland, U.S.
- Height: 6 ft 2 in (188 cm)
- Weight: Heavyweight

Boxing career
- Reach: 78 in (198 cm)
- Stance: Orthodox

Boxing record
- Total fights: 29
- Wins: 26
- Win by KO: 19
- Losses: 2
- Draws: 1

Seth Mitchell (born May 29, 1982) is an American former professional boxer who competed from 2008 to 2013. He also played college football for Michigan State University.

== Early life ==
Mitchell earned the nickname, “Little Superstar,” while growing up in Virginia Beach, Virginia by dominating older athletes in neighborhood pick-up basketball and football games. Despite being the youngest player on the court or field, he was often the first one picked to play. At the age of 12, Mitchell’s mother, Jeanette, moved him and his siblings to Brandywine, Maryland, where he first began to participate in organized sports.

== High school ==
Mitchell attended Gwynn Park High School in Brandywine, where he played both football and basketball. In ninth grade, he stood six feet tall, weighed 200 pounds, and wore a size 16 shoe. In tenth grade, his weight increased to 220 pounds, but he grew less than an inch taller. Mitchell realized his lack of height could negatively affect his ability to compete in college basketball, but would not hamper his ability to succeed on the college gridiron.

Mitchell started as a freshman on the varsity football team and impressed college scouts with his talent. During his junior and senior seasons, he led his team in defensive statistics, totaling over 200 tackles, six interceptions, and 24 sacks.

Mitchell’s play on the field brought him recognition and many high school football awards, including his selection as one of the top 20 linebackers in the nation, being named the Maryland Defensive Player of the Year, Washington Post All-Metro Defensive Player of the Year, USA Today Maryland State Player of the Year, in addition to earning PrepStar and SuperPrep All-American honors. The most significant honor was being the first football player in Gwynn Park High School history to have his jersey number retired (No. 48).

== College football ==
After receiving over a dozen NCAA Division I football scholarship offers, Mitchell decided to attend Michigan State University. As a redshirt sophomore, Mitchell played middle linebacker and was second on his team in tackles with 103. The same year, he led the Spartans in conference play with 10.6 tackles a game. He recorded his career-high 17 tackles while playing against Ohio State. Mitchell was forced to hang up his cleats for good in 2005 due to damaged cartilage in his knee. He continued his education and graduated from Michigan State with a Bachelor of Arts in Criminal Justice and Security Management. His nickname, "Mayhem," was given to him by his football teammate, Jason Teague.

Following Mitchell’s college graduation, he circulated resumes in search of a job that would allow him to utilize his degree. One evening, he watched a former Notre Dame football opponent, Tom Zbikowski, win his professional boxing debut at Madison Square Garden. He decided to put his career in criminal justice on hold.

== Amateur boxing career ==
Prior to 2006, Mitchell had never stepped into a boxing ring. An athletic background, strong work ethic and a focused demeanor helped prepare him to enter the sport of boxing. He had a brief, but impressive amateur career, with a record of 9–1, with nine knockouts.

== Professional boxing career ==
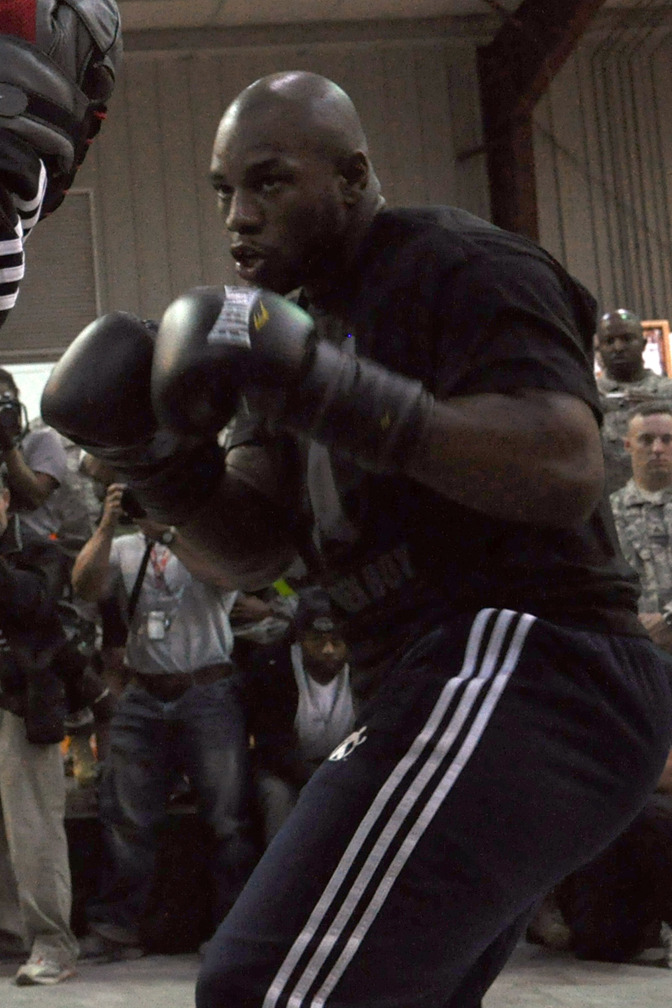
Mitchell in 2011

In 2008, Mitchell began his professional boxing career. After only his second professional fight, he signed with Golden Boy Promotions.

On December 11, 2010, he fought Taurus Sykes on the undercard of Amir Khan vs. Marcos Maidana, winning the fight by knock out in the fifth round.

On March 5, 2011, Mitchell fought Charles Davis, at Honda Center, Anaheim, California, on the undercard of the Canelo Álvarez vs. Matthew Hatton for the WBC light middleweight title. Mitchell won with a second-round TKO over Davis. The fight also gave Mitchell the fifteenth knockout of his career.

On May 13, 2011, Mitchell fought Nicaraguan boxer Evans Quinn and won the fight by knockout in round one. The fight was televised on Showtime. Mitchell was then originally scheduled to fight on the undercard of Marcos Maidana vs. Robert Guerrero on August 27, 2011. The venue was set to be HP Pavilion, San Jose, California. He was set to open the HBO-televised show. His opponent for the fight was to be the American journeyman Mike Mollo. However the whole card got cancelled on August 18, due to an injury to Robert Guerrero. After that he got a quick fight on September 16, in Texas Station Casino, Las Vegas against Hector Ferreyro. The fight was aired on TeleFutura and Fox in the United States. Mitchell won the fight by third-round TKO. He then fought on the Amir Khan vs. Lamont Peterson undercard on December 10, 2011, against Uzbek Timur Ibragimov. He opened the televised card on HBO by winning the fight on a second-round TKO.

His next fight was on April 28 as a part of the Bernard Hopkins vs. Chad Dawson undercard in Atlantic City. The opponent was former top contender Chazz Witherspoon. The fight was a co-main event and televised on HBO. Mitchell overcame some rocky moments and won the fight by third-round TKO, marking him going 25–0–1 and his tenth straight KO victory. Witherspoon was dropped once in round three before receiving a standing 8-count and the referee stopping the fight. With the win, Mitchell also won the vacant NABO heavyweight title.

Mitchell was scheduled to return on July 14, 2012 against Johnathon Banks at the Mandalay Bay Resort & Casino, Las Vegas. However, an injury to Mitchell's hand postponed the fight. The fight was rescheduled three times, without happening. First on September 15 at the MGM Grand Garden Arena, Las Vegas, Nevada. Then it was reported to take place on October 6, only to be moved to November 3, and finally November 17 in Atlantic City. Mitchell was defeated by TKO in the second round after being knocked down three times.

The rematch between Mitchell and Banks was scheduled for June 22, 2013, at Barclays Center in Brooklyn, New York. The fight was broadcast on Showtime as the co-feature to Adrien Broner vs Paulie Malignaggi. Mitchell went on to defeat Banks by unanimous decision over 12 rounds.

On September 7, 2013, Mitchell faced Chris Arreola for the WBC International heavyweight title at Fantasy Springs Resort and Casino, California. Mitchell was stopped in one round. After taking a huge right hand from Arreola, Mitchell appeared to be unable to stand up unaided and clung to Arreola, who then tossed Mitchell onto the canvas to receive the count. Mitchell was then dropped again but although on unsteady legs, was allowed to continue with the fight. He landed a big left hook that stopped Arreola in his tracks, but after taking further punishment the fight was halted. This victory gave Arreola a shot at the vacant WBC world title against Bermane Stiverne in May 2014.

== Professional boxing record ==
29 fights	26 wins	2 losses
By knockout	19	2
By decision	7	0
Draws	1	

No.	Result	Record	Opponent	Type	Round, time	Date	Location	Notes
29	Loss	26–2–1	Chris Arreola	KO	1 (12), 2:26	Sep 7, 2013	Fantasy Springs Casino, Indio, California, U.S.	Lost WBC International heavyweight title
28	Win	26–1–1	Johnathon Banks	UD	12	Jun 22, 2013	Barclays Center, New York City, New York, U.S.	Won WB0-NABO and WBC International heavyweight titles
27	Loss	25–1–1	Johnathon Banks	TKO	2 (12), 2:37	Nov 17, 2012	Boardwalk Hall, Atlantic City, New Jersey, U.S.	Lost WB0-NABO heavyweight title; For vacant WBC International heavyweight title
26	Win	25–0–1	Chazz Witherspoon	TKO	3 (12), 2:31	Apr 28, 2012	Boardwalk Hall, Atlantic City, New Jersey, U.S.	Won vacant WBO-NABO heavyweight title
25	Win	24–0–1	Timur Ibragimov	TKO	2 (10), 2:48	Dec 10, 2011	Convention Center, Washington, D.C., U.S.	
24	Win	23–0–1	Hector Ferreyro	TKO	3 (10), 2:17	Sep 16, 2011	Texas Station Casino, Las Vegas, Nevada, U.S.	
23	Win	22–0–1	Evans Quinn	KO	1 (10), 2:38	May 13, 2011	Buffalo Bill's Star Arena, Primm, Nevada, U.S.	
22	Win	21–0–1	Charles Davis	TKO	2 (10), 1:02	Mar 5, 2011	Honda Center, Anaheim, California, U.S.	
21	Win	20–0–1	Taurus Sykes	KO	5 (8), 1:42	Dec 11, 2010	Mandalay Bay Resort & Casino, Las Vegas, Nevada, U.S.	
20	Win	19–0–1	Derrick Brown	KO	1 (10), 2:59	Oct 15, 2010	Fantasy Springs Resort Casino, Indio, California, U.S.	
19	Win	18–0–1	Derek Bryant	TKO	1 (8), 1:45	Jul 31, 2010	Mandalay Bay Resort & Casino, Las Vegas, Nevada, U.S.	
18	Win	17–0–1	Johnnie White	TKO	2 (8), 1:18	May 7, 2010	Isleta Casino & Resort, Albuquerque, New Mexico, U.S.	
17	Win	16–0–1	Ryan Thompson	TKO	3 (8)	Apr 2, 2010	Convention Center, Washington, D.C., U.S.	
16	Win	15–0–1	Zack Page	UD	8	Dec 20, 2009	Rosecroft Raceway, Fort Washington, Maryland, U.S.	
15	Win	14–0–1	Jermell Barnes	TKO	6 (8)	Oct 24, 2009	Convention Center, Washington, D.C., U.S.	
14	Win	13–0–1	Andrae Carthron	KO	1 (6), 2:36	Aug 14, 2009	Desert Diamond Casino, Tucson, Arizona, U.S.	
13	Win	12–0–1	Alvaro Morales	UD	6	Jun 26, 2009	Desert Diamond Casino, Tucson, Arizona, U.S.	
12	Win	11–0–1	Andrew Greeley	UD	6	Apr 10, 2009	Du Burns Arena, Baltimore, Maryland, U.S.	
11	Win	10–0–1	Joseph Rabotte	TKO	1 (6), 1:19	Mar 7, 2009	HP Pavilion, San Jose, California, U.S.	
10	Win	9–0–1	Jason Bergman	TKO	5 (6), 2:59	Jan 23, 2009	Martin's West, Woodlawn, Maryland, U.S.	
9	Win	8–0–1	Dan Whetzel	TKO	1 (6), 2:39	Nov 7, 2008	Show Place Arena, Upper Marlboro, Maryland, U.S.	
8	Win	7–0–1	Shidevin Brown	UD	4	Oct 24, 2008	Morongo Casino, Resort & Spa, Cabazon, California, U.S.	
7	Win	6–0–1	Mike Miller	UD	6	Sep 25, 2008	Michael's Eighth Avenue, Glen Burnie, Maryland, U.S.	
6	Win	5–0–1	Ryan St Germain	TKO	2 (4)	Aug 15, 2008	Ibiza Nightclub, Washington, D.C., U.S.	
5	Win	4–0–1	Henry Namauu	KO	1 (4), 1:30	Jul 23, 2008	Morongo Casino, Resort & Spa, Cabazon, California, U.S.	
4	Win	3–0–1	Alexis Cruz Medina	TKO	2 (4), 1:23	May 29, 2008	Michael's Eighth Avenue, Glen Burnie, Maryland, U.S.	
3	Draw	2–0–1	Alvaro Morales	SD	4	Mar 22, 2008	Morongo Casino, Resort & Spa, Cabazon, California, U.S.	
2	Win	2–0	Maurice Winslow	TKO	1 (4), 0:46	Feb 29, 2008	National Guard Armory, Pikesville, Maryland, U.S.	
1	Win	1–0	Mike Miller	UD	4	Jan 18, 2008	National Guard Armory, Pikesville, Maryland, U.S.	

Sporting positions
Preceded by Tomasz Adamek	NABO Heavyweight Champion; 28 April 2012 – 17 November 2012	Succeeded by Johnathon Banks
Preceded by Johnathon Banks	WBC International Heavyweight Champion; June 22, 2013 – September 7, 2013	Succeeded by Chris Arreola
