= Willie Palms =

American boxer (born 1972)

- Palms (left) fights Timur Ibragimov

Personal information
- Nickname: Mr. P
- Nationality: American
- Born: William L. Palms; October 6, 1972 (age 53) Jersey City, New Jersey
- Weight: Heavyweight

Boxing career
- Stance: Orthodox

Boxing record
- Total fights: 22
- Wins: 10
- Win by KO: 5
- Losses: 11
- Draws: 1
- No contests: 0

William L. Palms (born October 6, 1972) is an American former professional boxer.

== Amateur career ==
Palms had a stellar amateur career, and won the U.S. National Championships as Super Heavyweight champion in 1997.

== Professional career ==
Palms turned pro in 1997 and won his first nine bouts, before losing a decision to Jean-Francois Bergeron in 2001. Palms evolved from amateur prospect to heavyweight journeyman, later losing a decision to Elieser Castillo in 2002 and Duncan Dokiwari in 2006.

On July 31, 2009, he was defeated by Timur Ibragimov by technical knockout in the 5th round and which he was down twice in the 3rd and once in the 5th before the referee stopped the fight.

== Professional boxing record ==
10 Wins (5 knockouts, 5 decisions), 10 Losses (4 knockouts, 6 decisions), 1 Draw
Result	Record	Opponent	Type	Round	Date	Location	Notes
Loss	10-0	(United States) Maurice Byarm	TKO	5	23/04/2011	(United States) Washington, D.C., U.S.	Referee stopped the bout at 1:50 of the fifth round.
Loss	24-15-1	(United States) Craig Tomlinson	UD	4	04/12/2009	(United States) Reading, Pennsylvania, U.S.	
Loss	24-2-1	(Uzbekistan) Timur Ibragimov	TKO	5	31/07/2009	(United States) Atlantic City, New Jersey, U.S.	Referee stopped the bout at 2:00 of the fifth round.
Loss	9-1	(Puerto Rico) Alexis Mejias	UD	6	19/06/2009	(United States) Dover, New Jersey, U.S.	
Loss	15-1	(United States) Adam Richards	TKO	6	20/01/2007	(United States) Tunica, Mississippi, U.S.	Referee stopped the bout at 1:46 of the sixth round.
Loss	24-3	(Nigeria) Duncan Dokiwari	TKO	4	01/12/2006	(United States) Laughlin, Nevada, U.S.	WBC USNBC Heavyweight Title. Referee stopped the bout at 1:39 of the fourth round.
Loss	11-0-1	(United States) Roderick Willis	UD	6	10/06/2006	(United States) Atlantic City, New Jersey, U.S.	
Loss	22-2-2	(Cuba) Elieser Castillo	MD	6	07/06/2002	(United States) Paradise, Nevada, U.S.	
Loss	16-14-1	(United States) Sedreck Fields	UD	6	29/03/2002	(United States) Paradise, Nevada, U.S.	
Win	8-0	(United States) Tali Kulihaapai	UD	6	18/01/2002	(United States) Paradise, Nevada, U.S.	
Draw	21-19-4	(United States) David Vedder	PTS	6	13/10/2001	(United States) Stateline, Nevada, U.S.	
Loss	10-0	(Canada) Jean Francois Bergeron	UD	6	28/09/2001	(United States) Paradise, Nevada, U.S.	
Win	12-4	(United States) Derrell Dixon	KO	5	20/07/2001	(United States) Paradise, Nevada, U.S.	Dixon knocked out at 1:39 of the fifth round.
Win	9-1	(United States) Stacy Frazier	TKO	3	28/04/2001	(United States) New York City, New York, U.S.	
Win	6-0	(United States) Moises Droz	UD	4	10/03/2001	(United States) Paradise, Nevada, U.S.	
Win	4-7	(North Macedonia) Errol Sadikovski	TKO	3	04/11/2000	(United States) New York City, New York, U.S.	
Win	5-0	(Belgium) Andrei Kopilou	UD	4	14/09/2000	(United States) New York City, New York, U.S.	
Win	4-0	(United States) Jason Brownlee	DQ	3	27/07/2000	(United States) New York City, New York, U.S.	
Win	2-1	(United States) Damon Saulbury	MD	4	29/06/2000	(United States) New York City, New York, U.S.	
Win	1-1	(United States) Shawn Hobbs	TKO	3	11/09/1997	(United States) Mashantucket, Connecticut, U.S.	
Win	2-0	(Puerto Rico) José Felipe Colón	TKO	1	02/08/1997	(United States) Uncasville, Connecticut, U.S.	

Preceded by Lawrence Clay-Bey	United States Amateur Super Heavyweight Champion; 1997	Succeeded by Dominick Guinn
