= Adam Richards (boxer) =

American boxer

Personal information
- Nickname: The Swamp Donkey
- Born: November 26, 1980 (age 45) Smyrna, Tennessee, U.S.
- Height: 6 ft 2 in (188 cm)
- Weight: Cruiserweight; Heavyweight

Boxing career
- Stance: Orthodox

Boxing record
- Total fights: 26
- Wins: 23
- Win by KO: 15
- Losses: 3

Adam Richards (born November 26, 1980) is an American former professional boxer who competed from 2001 to 2010, challenging for the WBO cruiserweight title in 2010. Richards was national amateur champion four times. He co-holds with Mike Tyson the record of winning two consecutive Junior Olympic heavyweight titles by knocking out every opponent.

== Amateur career ==
Richards amassed an amateur record of 238-10 (78 KOs).

=== Highlights ===
- Silver Gloves national champion x2
- Golden Gloves champion
- Junior Olympic super heavyweight champion
- Junior world super heavyweight champion
- 2000 Olympic trials quarterfinalist

== Professional career ==
Richards won his first two pro fights, but suffered a loss in his third fight. He then had a winning streak of 19 wins, with wins over Willie Palms, Billy Willis, Maurice Wheeler and Charles Davis.

Coming from his 19-fight winning streak, in November 2008 he fought heavyweight prospect Chazz Witherspoon in Nashville in a thrilling fight that ended with Richards' defeat via TKO in the eighth round.

In 2010 he faced Marco Huck for the WBO cruiserweight title. Richards was stopped by Huck in the third round of a lively fight. In the fight, Richards suffered a cut in the back of the head. The referee made a strange decision of calling Richards' first fall, after being pushed by Huck, a knockdown. Richards later criticized Huck due to reported elbows he suffered through the fight.

== Professional boxing record ==
23 Wins (15 knockouts), 3 Losses (3 knockouts)
Result	Record	Opponent	Type	Round	Date	Location	Notes
Loss	23-3	(Germany) Marco Huck	KO	3 (12), 2:30	March 13, 2010	Max Schmeling Halle, Berlin, Germany	For WBO cruiserweight title
Win	23-2	(United States) Harvey Jolly	SD		Aug. 22, 2009	(United States) Toyota Center, Houston, Texas, U.S.	
Win	22-2	(United States) Gustavo Enriquez	RTD		April 25, 2009	(United States) Fitzgerald's Casino & Hotel, Tunica, Mississippi, U.S.	
Loss	21-2	(United States) Chazz Witherspoon	TKO	8 (10), 1:32	Nov. 15, 2008	(United States) Vanderbilt University Memorial Gymnasium, Nashville, Tennessee, U.S.	
Win	21-1	(United States) Charles Davis	UD		July 26, 2008	(United States) Fitzgerald's Casino & Hotel, Tunica, Mississippi, U.S.	
Win	20-1	(United States) Maurice Wheeler	RTD		Dec. 8, 2007	(United States) Fitzgerald's Casino & Hotel, Tunica, Mississippi, U.S.	
Win	19-1	(United States) Rafael Pedro	DQ		Sept. 7, 2007	(United States) Hard Rock Casino, Biloxi, Mississippi, U.S.	
Win	18-1	(United States) Billy Willis	KO		June 30, 2007	(United States) Don Haskins Center, El Paso, Texas, U.S.	
Win	17-1	(United States) Earl Ladson	UD		March 17, 2007	(United States) American Bank Center, Corpus Christi, Texas, U.S.	
Win	16-1	(United States) Willie Palms	TKO	6, 1:46	Jan. 20, 2007	(United States) Fitzgerald's Casino & Hotel, Tunica, Mississippi, U.S.	
Win	15-1	(United States) Vernon Woodward	TKO		Nov. 10, 2006	(United States) Alamodome, San Antonio, Texas, U.S.	
Win	14-1	(United States) Tipton Walker	UD		Aug. 26, 2006	(United States) Fitzgerald's Casino & Hotel, Tunica, Mississippi, U.S.	
Win	13-1	(United States) Wes Taylor	KO		June 17, 2006	(United States) FedEx Forum, Memphis, Tennessee, U.S.	
Win	12-1	(United States) Ronnie Smith	KO		May 20, 2006	(United States) Fitzgerald's Casino & Hotel, Tunica, Mississippi, U.S.	
Win	11-1	(United States) Ralph West	UD		March 11, 2006	(United States) Fitzgerald's Casino & Hotel, Tunica, Mississippi, U.S.	
Win	10-1	(United States) Wade Lewis	KO		Jan. 28, 2006	(United States) Fitzgerald's Casino & Hotel, Tunica, Mississippi, U.S.	
Win	9-1	(United States) Hearn Marler	TKO		Dec. 10, 2005	(United States) Fitzgerald's Casino & Hotel, Tunica, Mississippi, U.S.	
Win	8-1	(United States) John Dixon	UD		Aug. 20, 2005	(United States) Isle of Capri Casino, Biloxi, Mississippi, U.S.	
Win	7-1	(United States) Joseph Harris	TKO		July 23, 2005	(United States) Fitzgerald's Casino & Hotel, Tunica, Mississippi, U.S.	
Win	6-1	(United States) Tyrone Muex	TKO		June 18, 2005	(United States) FedExForum, Memphis, Tennessee, U.S.	
Win	5-1	(United States) Lincoln Luke	TKO		April 23, 2005	(United States) Fitzgerald's Casino & Hotel, Tunica, Mississippi, U.S.	
Win	4-1	(United States) Eric Lindsey	KO		Feb. 19, 2005	(United States) Isle of Capri Casino, Lula, Mississippi, U.S.	
Win	3-1	(United States) Leroy Hollis	UD		Jan. 25, 2002	(United States) Young Pavilion, Pembroke Pines, Florida, U.S.	
Loss	2-1	(United States) Kevin Petty	TKO		June 17, 2001	(United States) Sunset Station, San Antonio, Texas, U.S.	
Win	2-0	(United States) Myron Berryman	KO		April 8, 2001	(United States) Grand Victoria Casino, Elgin, Illinois, U.S.	
Win	1-0	(United States) Lewis Gilbert	TKO		March 17, 2001	(United States) Silver Star Casino, Philadelphia, Pennsylvania, U.S.	

== Television viewership ==
Date	Fight	Viewership (avg.)	Network	Source(s)
13 March 2010	Marco Huck vs. Adam Richards	4,310,000	Das Erste	
15 November 2008	Chazz Witherspoon vs. Adam Richards	?	HBO	
