= Charles Davis (boxer) =

US professional boxer (born 1980)

Personal information
- Nationality: American
- Born: Charles Edward Davis; November 26, 1980 (age 45)
- Weight: Cruiserweight; Heavyweight

Boxing career
- Stance: Southpaw

Boxing record
- Total fights: 45
- Wins: 19
- Win by KO: 4
- Losses: 23
- Draws: 3

Charles Davis (born November 26, 1980) is an American former professional boxer. He won the vacant WBC Latino Heavyweight title in 2004. In 2005 he won the WBC Continental Americas Cruiserweight title, defeating Gary Gomez via unanimous decision in a 10-round bout. He lost the title one year later, at the first defense.

== Professional career ==
In 2004, he went to fight Arthur Williams with a record of 7–8–1. He defeated Williams via points decision after 10 rounds, going into a winning streak of 10 wins, that by December 2005 brought his record to 17-8-1.

On July 21, 2005, he beat Gary Gomez, winning the WBC Continental Americas cruiserweight title. He lost the title to Danny Batchelder on February 23, 2006. He lost to Batchelder via points decision, with scores of 96-94 (twice) and 97-93.

He was set to fight future WBC heavyweight champion Bermane Stiverne on April 29, 2009, in St. Louis, Missouri, at the Scottrade Center. The bout resulted in a draw. On January 22, 2011, he scored a draw against Monte Barrett.

His last bout, in which he fought Travis Kauffman, was stopped due to rain in the 7th round. Kauffman was awarded a points decision win.

== Professional boxing record ==
19 Wins (4 knockouts), 23 Losses (6 knockouts), 3 Draws
Result	Record	Opponent	Type	Round	Date	Location	Notes
Loss	19-23-3	(United States) Travis Kauffman	UD	7 (8)	2012-08-11	(United States) Gameface Sports Complex, Temple	Fight stopped due to rainfall
Loss	19-22-3	(United States) Seth Mitchell	TKO	2 (10), 1:02	2011-03-05	(United States) Honda Center, Anaheim	
Draw	19-21-3	(United States) Monte Barrett	MD	8	2011-01-22	(United States) The Greenbrier, White Sulphur Springs	
Loss	19-21-2	(United States) Kevin Johnson	KO	4 (8), 2:54	2010-10-29	(United States) Blake Hotel, Charlotte	
Loss	19-20-2	(United States) Luis Ortiz	TKO	4 (6), 2:20	2010-06-15	(United States) Seminole Hard Rock Hotel and Casino, Hollywood	
Loss	19-19-2	(United States) Victor Bisbal	UD	6	2010-02-26	(United States) Coliseo Ruben Rodriguez, Bayamon	
Loss	19-18-2	(United States) Dominick Guinn	UD	6	2009-12-12	(United States) UIC Pavilion, Chicago	
Win	19-17-2	(United States) Elieser Castillo	UD	6	2009-10-09	(United States) Club Destiny, Orlando	
Win	18-17-2	(United States) Arron Lyons	UD		2009-07-31	(United States) Pan American Center, Las Cruces	
Draw	17-17-2	(United States) Bermane Stiverne	MD	6	2009-04-24	(United States) Scottrade Center, Saint Louis	
Loss	17-17-1	(United States) Wilmer Vasquez	UD		2008-10-11	(United States) Grand Casino, Hinckley	
Loss	17-16-1	(United States) Adam Richards	UD	8	2008-07-26	(United States) Fitzgerald's Casino & Hotel, Tunica	
Loss	17-15-1	(United States) Devin Vargas	UD	8	2008-02-09	(United States) Aquarius Hotel, Laughlin	
Loss	17-14-1	(United States) Daniel Judah	SD	6	2007-09-01	(United States) Fitzgerald's Casino & Hotel, Tunica	
Loss	17-13-1	(United States) Chazz Witherspoon	TKO	7	2007-04-06	(United States) Blue Horizon, Philadelphia	
Loss	17-12-1	(United States) Aaron Williams	UD		2007-01-24	(United States) Sears Centre, Hoffman Estates	
Loss	17-11-1	(United States) Kevin Johnson	UD	10	2006-12-08	(United States) Paradise Theater, Bronx	
Loss	17-10-1	(United States) George Garcia	UD		2006-10-28	(United States) Celebrity Theater, Phoenix	
Loss	17-9-1	(United States) Danny Batchelder	UD	10	2006-02-23	(United States) Tachi Palace Hotel & Casino, Lemoore	Lost WBC Continental Americas Cruiserweight Title
Win	17-8-1	(United States) Jeffrey Brownfield	TKO		2005-12-15	(United States) Tachi Palace Hotel & Casino, Lemoore	
Win	16-8-1	(United States) Willie Chapman	UD		2005-09-16	(United States) Palace Indian Gaming Center, Lemoore	
Win	15-8-1	(United States) Gary Gomez	UD	10	2005-07-21	(United States) Palace Indian Gaming Center, Lemoore	Won WBC Continental Americas Cruiserweight Title
Win	14-8-1	(United States) James Brock	UD		2005-04-01	(United States) Palace Indian Gaming Center, Lemoore	
Win	13-8-1	(United States) Preston Kenney	KO		2005-02-11	(United States) Expo Center, City of Industry	
Win	12-8-1	(United States) John Clark	UD	10	2004-12-16	(United States) Palace Indian Gaming Center, Lemoore	Won vacant WBC Latino Heavyweight Title
Win	11-8-1	(United States) Javier Mora	UD	8	2004-10-16	(United States) Oakland Arena, Oakland	
Win	10-8-1	(United States) Ka Dy King	UD		2004-09-25	(United States) Cobo Hall, Detroit	
Win	9-8-1	(United States) Ka Dy King	MD		2004-08-28	(United States) Cobo Hall, Detroit	
Win	8-8-1	(United States) Arthur Williams	UD	10	2004-07-29	(United States) Oakland Arena, Oakland	
Loss	7-8-1	(United States) Anthony Bartinelli	SD	12	2002-06-25	(United States) Midnight Rodeo, Phoenix	For USA Arizona State Super Middleweight Title
Win	7-7-1	(United States) Carlos Mendez	UD		2001-12-09	(United States) New West Night Club, Tucson	
Loss	6-7-1	(United States) Conal MacPhee	PTS		2001-10-20	(United States) West Wendover	
Loss	6-6-1	(United States) Sione Asipeli	KO		1999-07-30	(United States) Celebrity Theater, Phoenix	
Loss	6-5-1	(United States) Julio Cesar Gonzalez	MD		1998-09-26	(United States) Caesars Tahoe, Stateline	
Loss	6-4-1	(United States) Miguel Angel Jimenez	PTS		1998-07-31	(United States) Orleans Hotel & Casino, Las Vegas	
Loss	6-3-1	(United States) Joseph Laryea	PTS		1998-07-11	(United States) Hilton Hotel, Reno	
Draw	6-2-1	(United States) John Kiser	PTS		1998-05-05	(United States) Midnight Rodeo, Phoenix	
Loss	6-2	(United States) Miguel Angel Jimenez	TKO		1997-10-17	(United States) Coliseum, Phoenix	
Win	6-1	(United States) Lee Martin	UD		1997-07-25	(United States) Quality Inn, Tucson	
Win	5-1	(United States) Tom Gaffney	UD		1997-06-06	(United States) Quality Inn, Tucson	
Win	4-1	(United States) Terry Smith	TKO		1997-04-26	(United States) Fantasy Springs Casino, Indio	
Win	3-1	(United States) Jarred Kemp	TKO		1997-04-19	(United States) Celebrity Theater, Phoenix	
Loss	2-1	(United States) Fidel Hernandez	SD		1996-10-29	(United States) Coliseum, Phoenix	
Win	2-0	(United States) Thomas Covington	UD		1996-05-17	(United States) 35th Ave Swap Meet, Phoenix	
Win	1-0	(United States) Felizardo Diaz	UD		1996-04-19	(United States) 35th Ave Swap Meet, Phoenix	
