= Chazz Witherspoon =

American boxer

Personal information
- Nickname: The Gentleman
- Born: September 16, 1981 (age 44) Philadelphia, Pennsylvania, U.S.
- Height: 6 ft 4 in (193 cm)
- Weight: Heavyweight

Boxing career
- Reach: 76 in (193 cm)

Boxing record
- Total fights: 42
- Wins: 38
- Win by KO: 29
- Losses: 4

Chazz Witherspoon (born September 16, 1981) is an American former professional boxer. The second cousin of former boxing champion Tim Witherspoon, he emerged as a talented boxer in the 2000s. He won the 2004 National Golden Gloves finals in Kansas City, Missouri, and by collecting all wins via stoppage, he became the first man in the history of the Golden Gloves to win the National Title by all stoppages.

In 2008, holding a record of 23–0 with 14 KOs, he was set to fight fellow heavyweight prospect Chris Arreola to determine America's top heavyweight contender. Witherspoon lost the fight, and Arreola went on to challenge world champion Vitali Klitschko. After this defeat, he had three wins (all by knockout) before losing again, this time to Tony Thompson, in December 2009. He had four more wins (three by knockout) before suffering his third defeat, to Seth Mitchell, in a fight he was winning.

In 2019, Witherspoon was set to fight former undisputed cruiserweight champion Oleksandr Usyk in his first fight at heavyweight, with just a few days' notice, after Tyrone Spong, Usyk's scheduled opponent, tested positive for a banned substance. Witherspoon came to the fight after a streak of 8 wins (6 by knockout) since his loss to Mitchell, having defeated Tyyab Beale, Cory Phelps, Galen Brown, Nick Guivas, Michael Marrone, Carlos Sandoval, Lamont Capers and Santander Silgado. Witherspoon lost the fight against Usyk as he retired in his corner after round 7.

== Early life and education ==
Witherspoon was born the oldest of three children in West Philadelphia, Pennsylvania, to Eric Witherspoon. Raied in Paulsboro, New Jersey, he attended Paulsboro High School, where he played basketball and graduated with a 4.0 GPA and as a member of the National Honor Society. Upon graduation, he was offered three NCAA Division I basketball scholarships and two track scholarships, but chose to instead accept a full academic scholarship at Saint Joseph's University. He graduated from Saint Joseph with a degree in pharmaceutical marketing in 2005.

Witherspoon's cousin Tim later introduced him to experienced boxing trainers Randy and Wade Hinnant, and both assisted and encouraged his development in the sport.

== Amateur career ==
Witherspoon began his amateur boxing career in his sophomore year at Saint Joseph's University. A year later, Witherspoon won the Pennsylvania State Golden Gloves title. Five months later he placed third at the 2003 National Police Athletic League Tournament. Three months after that he won the Middle Atlantic Regional Tournament, qualifying him for the U.S. Championships and in the process was awarded the title of “Most Outstanding Boxer”.

He took second place at the 2004 U.S. Championships, which qualified him for the Olympic trials, where he advanced to the Olympic Box-offs but only made the Olympic team as an alternate.

Two months after returning from the Athens Olympics he won his second Pennsylvania Golden Gloves Title, thus advancing to the 2004 National Golden Gloves finals in Kansas City, Missouri which he won, all wins via stoppage. He is the first man in the history of the Golden Gloves to win the National Title by all stoppages.

His amateur record is 26 wins and 6 losses.

== Professional career ==
Known as "The Gentleman", Witherspoon turned pro in 2004 and was undefeated for the first 23 of his professional bouts, winning 15 by KO.

Coming from a winning streak of 23 wins (15 by knockout), the undefeated Witherspoon was set to fight against Chris Arreola to determine the top heavyweight contender of America. Before the fight, Lou DiBella stated: "The winner [of Witherspoon vs Arreola] is clearly going to be the guy [who emerges as a top heavyweight contender]". HBO's Larry Merchant stated: "Witherspoon and Arreola clearly are the two most advanced, relatively unknown American heavyweights. The winner will emerge as the better of the two and immediately goes on the short list of U.S. contenders who could be in line to get a crack at one of the world titles in the relatively near future".

On June 21, 2008, Witherspoon lost the fight against fellow heavyweight prospect Chris Arreola in which he was disqualified in the third round. Arreola landed a barrage of punches that was capped off by a chopping right that sent Witherspoon to the canvas. The bell rang early in the count, prompting Witherspoon's corner to begin entering the ring. This was ruled by the referee to be a disqualification since the round is not technically over until the count is over.

Witherspoon in his next fight defeated Adam Richards by 8th-round TKO, in an action packed fight which received Ring Magazine's 2008 Heavyweight Fight Of the year.

Witherspoon next fought Travis Fulton and Willie Perryman, defeating both of them by knockout. He then suffered the second defeat of his career at the hands of Tony Thompson, losing by TKO in the ninth round. He then defeated Livin Castillo in Atlantic City, New Jersey, on August 28, 2010. Three months later, on November 19, 2010, he defeated Alexis Mejias, also in Atlantic City. Witherspoon had two more wins (both by knockout) before suffering his third defeat, being defeated by Seth Mitchell in a fight Witherspoon was winning. Witherspoon next had a winning streak of 8 victories (six by knockout), overcoming Tyyab Beale, Cory Phelps, Galen Brown, Nick Guivas, Michael Marrone, Carlos Sandoval, Lamont Capers and Santander Silgado.

=== Witherspoon vs. Usyk ===
Witherspoon was set to fight former undisputed cruiserweight champion and future two-time undisputed heavyweight champion Oleksandr Usyk. Usyk had been set to debut in the heavyweight division on October 12, 2019, at the Wintrust Arena, Chicago, Illinois, against Tyrone Spong. However, Spong tested positive for clomiphene, a banned substance, just a few days before the bout. The promoter Eddie Hearn announced that several backup fighters were being considered among whom Witherspoon was chosen. Thus, Witherspoon joined the fight with a few days' notice. Eventually Usyk won the fight as Witherspoon retired in his corner after round 7.

== Professional boxing record ==
42 fights	38 wins	4 losses
By knockout	29	3
By decision	9	0
By disqualification	0	1

No.	Result	Record	Opponent	Type	Round, time	Date	Location	Notes
42	Loss	38–4	Oleksandr Usyk	RTD	7 (12), 3:00	Oct 12, 2019	Wintrust Arena, Chicago, Illinois, U.S.	
41	Win	38–3	Santander Silgado	RTD	2 (8), 3:00	Mar 23, 2019	Showboat Hotel and Casino, Atlantic City, New Jersey, U.S.	
40	Win	37–3	Lamont Capers	UD	8	Mar 10, 2018	Claridge Hotel & Casino, Atlantic City, New Jersey, U.S.	
39	Win	36–3	Carlos Sandoval	TKO	4 (10), 1:25	Oct 1, 2016	Sun National Bank Center, Trenton, New Jersey, U.S.	
38	Win	35–3	Mike Marrone	TKO	2 (6), 1:31	Aug 6, 2016	Grundy Arena, Bristol, Pennsylvania, U.S.	
37	Win	34–3	Nick Guivas	TKO	3 (10), 1:07	Aug 15, 2015	The Playground, Atlantic City, New Jersey, U.S.	
36	Win	33–3	Galen Brown	TKO	5 (10)	Apr 18, 2015	GPG Events Center, Pennsauken, New Jersey, U.S.	
35	Win	32–3	Cory Phelps	TKO	2 (10), 1:30	Jan 24, 2015	GPG Events Center, Pennsauken, New Jersey, U.S.	
34	Win	31–3	Tyyab Beale	TKO	8 (8), 1:59	Jul 12, 2014	Riverwinds Community Center, West Deptford, New Jersey, U.S.	
33	Loss	30–3	Seth Mitchell	TKO	3 (12), 2:31	Apr 28, 2012	Boardwalk Hall, Atlantic City, New Jersey, U.S.	For WBO-NABO heavyweight title
32	Win	30–2	David Saulsberry	KO	2 (10), 0:42	Feb 4, 2012	Tropicana Atlantic City, Atlantic City, New Jersey, U.S.	Won vacant IBS North American Continental heavyweight title
31	Win	29–2	Ty Cobb	KO	3 (8), 1:07	Oct 22, 2011	Tropicana Atlantic City, Atlantic City, New Jersey, U.S.	
30	Win	28–2	Alexis Mejias	RTD	4 (10), 3:00	Nov 19, 2010	Harrah’s Resort, Atlantic City, New Jersey, U.S.	
29	Win	27–2	Livin Castillo	TKO	7 (10), 2:21	Aug 28, 2010	Etess Arena, Atlantic City, New Jersey, U.S.	
28	Loss	26–2	Tony Thompson	TKO	9 (10), 2:13	Dec 15, 2009	Boardwalk Hall, Atlantic City, New Jersey, U.S.	
27	Win	26–1	Willie Perryman	KO	2 (6), 2:09	Aug 29, 2009	Fitzgeralds Casino and Hotel, Tunica Resorts, Mississippi, U.S.	
26	Win	25–1	Travis Fulton	TKO	3 (10), 1:43	Mar 28, 2009	Buffalo Run Casino, Miami, Oklahoma, U.S.	
25	Win	24–1	Adam Richards	TKO	8 (10), 1:29	Nov 15, 2008	Memorial Gymnasium, Nashville, Tennessee, U.S.	
24	Loss	23–1	Chris Arreola	DQ	3 (12), 3:00	Jun 21, 2008	FedExForum, Memphis, Tennessee, U.S.	For WBC Continental Americas heavyweight title; Witherspoon disqualified after his corner entered the ring
23	Win	23–0	Domonic Jenkins	UD	10	Apr 16, 2008	Hammerstein Ballroom, New York City, New York, U.S.	
22	Win	22–0	Jonathan Haggler	TKO	4 (8), 2:44	Feb 15, 2008	Commerce Bank Art Center, Sewell, New Jersey U.S.	
21	Win	21–0	Kendrick Releford	UD	8	Jan 5, 2008	Bally's Park Place, Atlantic City, New Jersey, U.S.	
20	Win	20–0	Ron Guerrero	RTD	5 (8), 0:11	Sep 29, 2007	Boardwalk Hall, Atlantic City, New Jersey, U.S.	
19	Win	19–0	Talmadge Griffis	TKO	9 (10), 1:08	Jul 27, 2007	City Center, Saratoga Springs, New York, U.S.	
18	Win	18–0	Joe Stofle	TKO	3 (8), 1:10	May 19, 2007	FedExForum, Memphis, Tennessee, U.S.	
17	Win	17–0	Charles Davis	TKO	7 (8), 0:19	Apr 6, 2007	The Blue Horizon, Philadelphia, Pennsylvania, U.S.	
16	Win	16–0	Patrick Smith	TKO	2 (6), 1:38	Feb 10, 2007	Klein Jewish Community Center, Philadelphia, Pennsylvania, U.S.	
15	Win	15–0	Earl Ladson	KO	3 (8), 2:13	Oct 14, 2006	National Guard Armory, Philadelphia, Pennsylvania, U.S.	
14	Win	14–0	Innocent Otukwu	KO	2 (6), 0:45	Sep 15, 2006	The Blue Horizon, Philadelphia, Pennsylvania, U.S.	
13	Win	13–0	Michael A. Alexander	UD	10	Jul 1, 2006	Little River Casino, Manistee, Michigan, U.S.	
12	Win	12–0	Agustin Corpus	UD	6	May 11, 2006	First District Plaza, Philadelphia, Pennsylvania, U.S.	
11	Win	11–0	David Polk	UD	6	Apr 7, 2006	The Blue Horizon, Philadelphia, Pennsylvania, U.S.	
10	Win	10–0	Rodney Ray	TKO	2 (4), 2:55	Mar 3, 2006	New Alhambra, Philadelphia, Pennsylvania, U.S.	
9	Win	9–0	Demetrice King	UD	6	Nov 5, 2005	Caesars Tahoe, Stateline, Nevada, U.S.	
8	Win	8–0	Lincoln Luke	TKO	2 (6), 2:00	Sep 29, 2005	Michael's Eighth Avenue, Glen Burnie, Maryland, U.S.	
7	Win	7–0	Vernon Woodward	TKO	3 (6), 0:43	Aug 8 2005	St. Pete Times Forum, Tampa, Florida, U.S.	
6	Win	6–0	Marion Wilson	UD	4	Jun 16, 2005	Michael's Eighth Avenue, Glen Burnie, Maryland, U.S.	
5	Win	5–0	Cornell Bradbury	KO	1 (4), 2:14	May 17, 2005	The Lagoon Night Club, Essington, Pennsylvania, U.S.	
4	Win	4–0	Harold Rodriguez	TKO	4 (4), 2:40	Apr 15, 2005	National Guard Armory, Philadelphia, Pennsylvania, U.S.	
3	Win	3–0	David Johnson	UD	4	Feb 18, 2005	Chumash Casino, Santa Ynez, California, U.S.	
2	Win	2–0	Yul Witherspoon	TKO	2 (4), 1:26	Jan 27, 2005	Michael's Eighth Avenue, Glen Burnie, Maryland, U.S.	
1	Win	1–0	James Daniels	KO	1 (4), 1:53	Dec 12, 2004	Convention Center, Washington, D.C., U.S.	
