= Johnathon Banks =

American boxer

Personal information
- Nickname: Mr. Banks
- Born: Southfield, Michigan, U.S.
- Height: 6 ft 3 in (191 cm)
- Weight: Heavyweight; Cruiserweight

Boxing career
- Reach: 76 in (193 cm)
- Stance: Orthodox

Boxing record
- Total fights: 33
- Wins: 29
- Win by KO: 19
- Losses: 3
- Draws: 1

Johnathon Banks is an American former professional boxer who competed from 2004 to 2014. He held the IBO cruiserweight title from 2008 to 2009 and challenged once for the IBF cruiserweight title in 2009. He currently works as a boxing trainer, most notably for former heavyweight champion Wladimir Klitschko, and was himself trained by the late Emanuel Steward. He is currently coaching Gennady Golovkin, Cecilia Braekhus, as well as Badou Jack.

== Amateur career ==
Prior to turning professional, Banks enjoyed a successful amateur career that saw him become a three-time National Amateur Champion at 178 lbs.

== Professional career ==
He fought out of the Kronk Gym in Detroit.

Banks became the NABO Cruiserweight Champion, knocking out Eliseo Castillo in the fourth round.

After victories over Derrick Brown (13-3-3) and Imamu Mayfield (25-8-2) Banks lined himself up for a title clash for the IBO Cruiserweight title.

=== IBO Cruiserweight Championship ===
On July 12 Banks fought Vincenzo Rossitto for the vacant IBO Cruiserweight Championship, Johnathon won by a majority decision.

=== IBF Cruiserweight Championship ===
He then fought Tomasz Adamek for the IBF Cruiserweight Championship title on February 27 in Newark, NJ at the Prudential Center. Banks was unsuccessful and was knocked out in the eighth round.

=== WBC Heavyweight Semi-Final Eliminator ===
Banks was set to fight undefeated prospect Seth Mitchell on November 17, 2012 in Atlantic City. He defeated Seth Mitchell by a second-round knockout. In a 2013 rematch, however, Banks dropped a unanimous decision to Mitchell.

== Work as a trainer ==
After the death of Emmanuel Steward, Banks assumed the role of head trainer of world heavyweight champion Wladimir Klitschko. In July 2015 he replaced Chris Okoh as Dillian Whyte's trainer after the latter got injured. As of May 4 of 2019, Gennady Golovkin introduced Banks as his new head coach.

== Professional boxing record ==
33 fights	29 wins	3 losses
By knockout	19	2
By decision	10	1
Draws	1	

Key to abbreviations used for results
DQ	Disqualification	RTD	Corner retirement
KO	Knockout	SD	Split decision / split draw
MD	Majority decision / majority draw	TD	Technical decision / technical draw
NC	No contest	TKO	Technical knockout
PTS	Points decision	UD	Unanimous decision / unanimous draw

Boxing record
No.	Result	Record	Opponent	Type	Round(s), time	Date	Location	Notes
33	Loss	29–3–1	Antonio Tarver	TKO	7 (10), 2:25	Dec 11, 2014	Pechanga Resort & Casino, Temecula, California, U.S.	
32	Loss	29–2–1	Seth Mitchell	UD	12	Jun 22, 2013	Barclays Center, New York City, New York, U.S.	Lost WBO-NABO and WBC International heavyweight titles
31	Win	29–1–1	Seth Mitchell	TKO	2 (12), 2:37	Nov 17, 2012	Boardwalk Hall, Atlantic City, New Jersey, U.S.	Won WBO-NABO and vacant WBC International heavyweight titles
30	Win	28–1–1	Nicolai Firtha	UD	12	Feb 18, 2012	Olympiahalle, Munich, Germany	Retained NABF heavyweight title
29	Win	27–1–1	Ivica Bacurin	KO	6 (8), 2:59	Sep 10, 2011	Stadion Miejski, Wrocław, Poland	
28	Win	26–1–1	Julius Long	UD	10	Jul 2, 2011	Atwood Stadium, Flint, Michigan, U.S.	
27	Win	25–1–1	Saul Montana	UD	12	Sep 11, 2010	Waldstadion, Frankfurt, Germany	Retained NABF heavyweight title
26	Draw	24–1–1	Jason Gavern	SD	12	May 29, 2010	Arena AufSchalke, Gelsenkirchen, Germany	Retained NABF heavyweight title
25	Win	24–1	Travis Walker	TKO	6 (12), 1:51	Mar 20, 2010	Esprit Arena, Düsseldorf, Germany	Won vacant NABF heavyweight title
24	Win	23–1	Marcel Zeller	TKO	1 (8), 0:37	Dec 12, 2009	PostFinance Arena, Bern, Switzerland	
23	Win	22–1	Javier Mora	MD	8	Sep 26, 2009	Staples Center, Los Angeles, California, U.S.	
22	Win	21–1	Paul Butlin	KO	7 (8), 0:56	Jun 20, 2009	Arena AufSchalke, Gelsenkirchen, Germany	
21	Loss	20–1	Tomasz Adamek	TKO	8 (12), 1:30	Feb 27, 2009	Prudential Center, Newark, New Jersey, U.S.	Lost IBO cruiserweight title; For IBF cruiserweight title
20	Win	20–0	Vincenzo Rossitto	MD	12	Jul 12, 2008	Color Line Arena, Hamburg, Germany	Won vacant IBO cruiserweight title
19	Win	19–0	Imamu Mayfield	TKO	1 (10), 1:49	Feb 23, 2008	Madison Square Garden, New York City, New York, U.S.	
18	Win	18–0	Derrick Brown	UD	12	Nov 15, 2007	Compuware Arena, Plymouth, Michigan, U.S.	Retained WBO-NABO cruiserweight title
17	Win	17–0	Gustavo Enriquez	TKO	4 (12), 1:02	Jul 7, 2007	Kolnarena, Cologne, Germany	Retained WBO-NABO cruiserweight title
16	Win	16–0	Lloyd Bryan	TKO	3 (8)	May 18, 2007	Omni New Daisy Theater, Memphis, Tennessee, U.S.	
15	Win	15–0	Ralf Riemer	TKO	1 (8), 0:32	Mar 10, 2007	SAP Arena, Mannheim, Germany	
14	Win	14–0	Zack Page	UD	8	Jan 25, 2007	Orleans Arena, Paradise, Nevada, U.S.	
13	Win	13–0	Sebastian Hill	KO	2 (10), 0:41	Dec 16, 2006	Bert's Warehouse Theatre, Detroit, Michigan, U.S.	
12	Win	12–0	Eliseo Castillo	KO	4 (10), 1:12	Jul 26, 2006	Hammerstein Ballroom, New York City, New York, U.S.	Won WBO-NABO cruiserweight title
11	Win	11–0	Sebastian Hill	TKO	1 (8), 3:00	Mar 10, 2006	Joe Louis Arena, Detroit, Michigan, U.S.	
10	Win	10–0	Mike Word	KO	5 (8), 1:45	Feb 2, 2006	Fisher Building, Detroit, Michigan, U.S.	
9	Win	9–0	Joe Johnson	KO	1 (8), 0:37	Nov 4, 2005	The Palace of Auburn Hills, Auburn Hills, Michigan, U.S.	
8	Win	8–0	Roosevelt Johnson	KO	1 (8), 0:26	Aug 13, 2005	The Palace of Auburn Hills, Auburn Hills, Michigan, U.S.	
7	Win	7–0	Raymond McLamore	KO	1 (6), 2:28	Jul 29, 2005	DeltaPlex Arena, Grand Rapids, Michigan, U.S.	
6	Win	6–0	Abdul Shabazz	KO	1 (6), 0:43	Apr 29, 2005	The Palace of Auburn Hills, Auburn Hills, Michigan, U.S.	
5	Win	5–0	Anterio Vines	KO	1 (4), 0:31	Jan 28, 2005	DeCarlo's Convention Center, Warren, Michigan, U.S.	
4	Win	4–0	Carl Gathright	UD	4	Nov 27, 2004	Grand Victoria Casino & Resort, Rising Sun, Indiana, U.S.	
3	Win	3–0	Travis Moore	KO	1 (4)	Oct 27, 2004	Andiamo's Banquet Center, Warren, Michigan, U.S.	
2	Win	2–0	Tihomir Dukic	UD	4	Sep 23, 2004	Pechanga Resort & Casino Temecula, California, U.S.	
1	Win	1–0	Deandre McCole	UD	4	Jul 30, 2004	Mohegan Sun Casino, Uncasville, Connecticut, U.S.	

Sporting positions
Regional boxing titles
Vacant Title last held by Mariusz Wach	WBC International Heavyweight Champion; November 17, 2012 – June 22, 2013	Succeeded by Seth Mitchell
Preceded by Seth Mitchell	NABO Heavyweight Champion; November 17, 2012 – June 22, 2013	Succeeded by Seth Mitchell
Minor world boxing titles
Vacant Title last held by Tomasz Adamek	IBO Cruiserweight Champion; July 12, 2008 – February 27, 2009; Lost bid for IBF title	Vacant Title next held by Danny Green

== Head trainer at KRONK Gym (2025–present) ==
Following the 2025 revival of Kronk Gym at the Brewster-Wheeler Recreation Center in Detroit, Banks was appointed head trainer of the revived gym under new ownership. In this role, Banks continues the training legacy established by Emanuel Steward, who personally designated Banks as his successor during Steward's final illness in 2012.
