= Evans Quinn =

Nicaraguan boxer

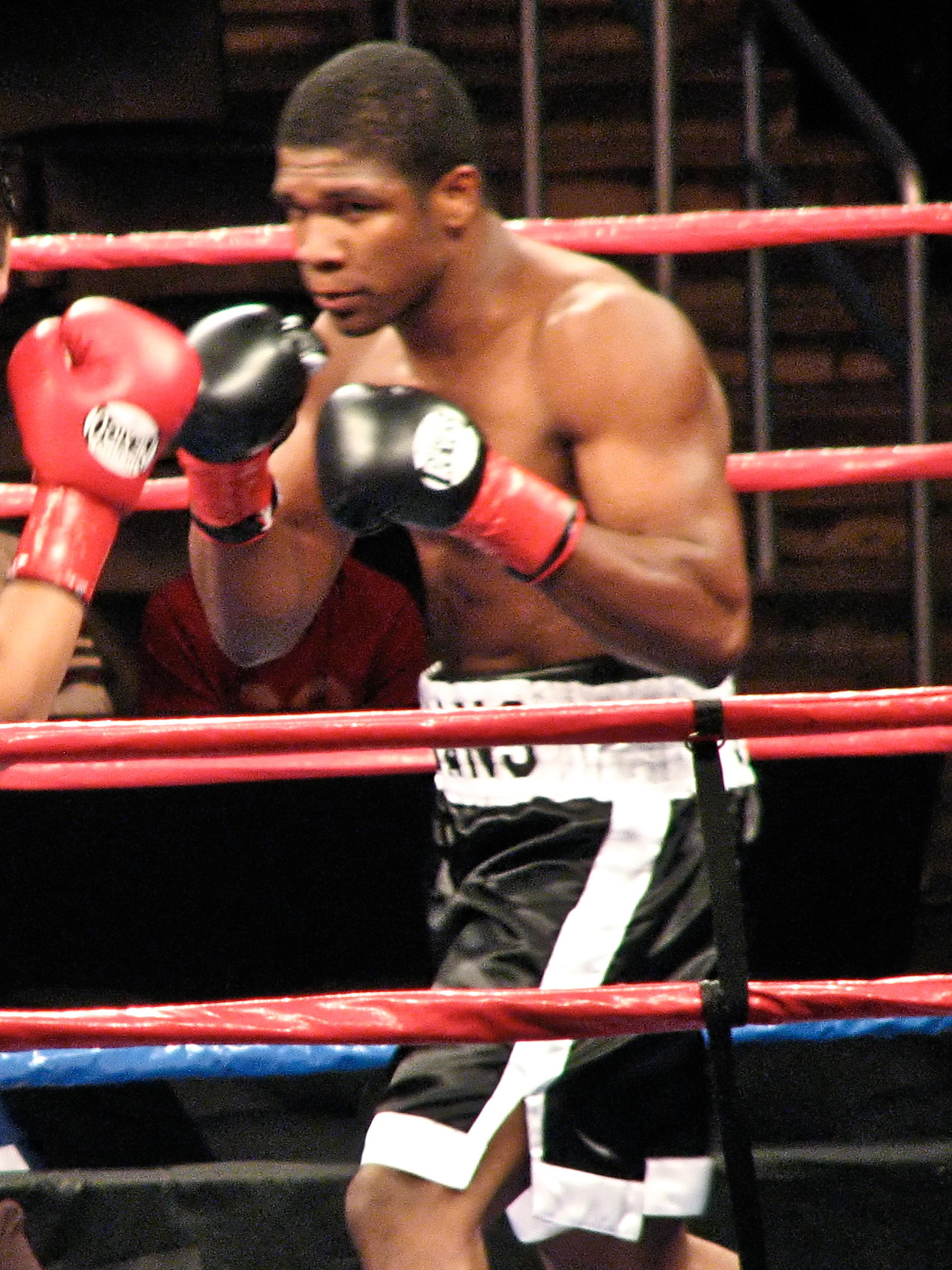
- Evans in 2007

Personal information
- Nickname: The Sandman
- Nationality: Nicaragua
- Born: July 1, 1983 (age 43) Bluefields, Nicaragua
- Height: 1.91 m (6 ft 3 in)
- Weight: Heavyweight

Boxing career
- Stance: Orthodox

Boxing record
- Total fights: 27
- Wins: 20
- Win by KO: 18
- Losses: 6
- Draws: 1

Evans Quinn (born July 1, 1983) is a Nicaraguan former professional boxer. A naturally talented and powerful fighter, Quinn recorded 20 professional wins, 18 of which came by knock out. Amidst reports of a lackadaisical approach to training and a taste for partying, Quinn's early potential went unfulfilled. His career stalled following high profile defeats to Siarhei Liakhovich, Kali Meehan and, in Quinn's final bout in May 2011, Seth Mitchell.

In February 2012, Quinn gunned down Raul Bennett Sambola in their mutual home town of Bluefields following a family feud. After spending a year on the run, Quinn was finally arrested in April 2013. He admitted to the murder and was sentenced to 17 years in jail.

== Amateur career ==
Quinn entered boxing due to his father, who had himself boxed in the 1980s. Whilst serving in the Nicaraguan army, Quinn was dominant in the country's amateur boxing ranks, winning all 38 of his contests. Having left the army, he turned professional in 2004.

== Professional career ==
Quinn spent his first two years as a professional fighting in Nicaragua and neighbouring Costa Rica. Compiling a 13-2 record and earning the nickname "The Sandman", he attracted the attention of American promoter Don King, whose organisation gave him a contract allowing entry the US to participate in more lucrative bouts.

He won his first four fights in the US, including a dominant performance against JJ McAllister in 2007, whom he knocked down 49 seconds into the first round.

Having built up a sequence of 13 victories but gaining a reputation within the boxing fraternity for being more interested in carousing than serious training, Quinn was unexpectedly defeated by journeyman Harvey Jolly on April 24, 2009, in St. Louis on a split decision. He subsequently lost his next two fights, against former WBO world champion Siarhei Liakhovich in Germany and ex-rugby player Kali Meehan in Australia.

Quinn returned to Nicaragua for a couple of a confidence boosting bouts against locals before returning to the US to face up-and-coming fighter Seth Mitchell. Mitchell defeated Quinn by knockout in the first round, with Quinn having fallen to his knees following a few hard jabs from Mitchell and declining to get up. It was to prove his last professional fight. Quinn travelled to Australia for a training camp but quit after two weeks and returned home.

== Personal life ==
A huge figure in his impoverished home town, Quinn was known for encouraging or cajoling fellow townsfolk into performing civic improvement activities. Despite this, he also had a number of run-ins with local authorities. In one incident he used his physicality to deprive a naval officer of their AK-47 after they demanded that he stopped smoking a cannabis joint in public, and was subsequently arrested. In 2008, Quinn and his father were accused of being involved in a plot to break two Colombian drug traffickers out of prison and kill the prosecutor of their case. Quinn denied the charges, which were subsequently dropped.

== Murder conviction ==
In 2011, Quinn came across Raul Bennett Sambola, whose boat had run out of fuel. Quinn gave Sambola fuel for which Sambola would repay him at a later date. When the time came, Sambola refused to pay the amount that Quinn claimed was owed. In retribution, Quinn took the engine from Sambola's boat and told police that he would only return it when he was paid the money that he was owed.

A few weeks later, Sambola shot Quinn's younger brother Jorge twice in a nightclub, leaving Jorge with life-changing injuries. Sambola was arrested, but released on the condition that he paid for Jorge’s medical bills. A furious Quinn told the police that if they didn't lock Sambola up then he would kill him. Returning from a trip to Miami three months later and finding Sambola still free, Quinn went on a local radio show to announce that if Sambola didn't leave town within a month then he would be killed. Thirty days later, on February 19, 2012, Quinn shot Sambola to death in a busy restaurant. Quinn got a taxi to the quayside and made his escape on a jet ski.

Quinn then went on the run, evading capture for over a year before finally being arrested in April 2013, along with three of his wives and two Colombians who were with him at the time. He was charged with both Sambola's murder and other charges including being head of a criminal enterprise involved with drug and people trafficking. Quinn admitted to committing the murder but denied the other charges. For the murder he was sentenced to 17 years in La Modelo prison.
