= Andre Purlette =

Guyanese boxer

Personal information
- Nickname: Tombstone
- Nationality: Guyanese
- Born: November 4, 1973 (age 52) Georgetown, Guyana
- Height: 6 ft 1 in (1.85 m)
- Weight: Heavyweight

Boxing career
- Stance: Orthodox

Boxing record
- Total fights: 44
- Wins: 40
- Win by KO: 35
- Losses: 4

Andre Purlette (born 4 November 1973) is a Guyanese former professional boxer who competed from 1992 to 2009 in the heavyweight division. Known as "Tombstone", Purlette turned pro in 1992 and won his first 32 bouts, including a victory over Jimmy Thunder. He later lost to veteran Jeremy Williams in 2003 and was knocked out by Aaron Williams in 2008.

His professional career began when he was 19, on Boxing Day 1992, with a first-round knockout of Alberto Ellis at the National Park. He went undefeated until 2002, when he was knocked out in round five of a heavyweight fight against 27-year-old Eliecer Castillo at American Airlines Arena on January 4, 2002.

Pulette won the World Boxing Council Latino heavyweight title with a TKO victory over Crawford Grimsley on September 7, 2002, in Prague. He had five more wins before two losses against Aaron Williams and Harold Sconiers.

He retired in 2009 and moved to the US.

Since then, he was inducted into the Stabroek News Boxing Hall of Fame.

== Professional boxing record ==
40 Wins (35 knockouts), 4 Losses Archived September 2, 2012, at the Wayback Machine
Result	Record	Opponent	Type	Round	Date	Location	Notes
Loss	15-20-2	(United States) Harold Sconiers	TKO	3	24/10/2009	(United States) Charlotte, North Carolina, U.S.	Referee stopped the bout at 0:36 of the third round.
Loss	16-0-1	(United States) Aaron Williams	TKO	2	04/04/2008	(United States) Lincoln, Rhode Island, U.S.	Referee stopped the bout at 2:50 of the second round.
Win	13-19-2	(United States) Andrew Greeley	UD	6	06/12/2007	(United States) Bronx, New York, U.S.	
Win	18-4-3	(United States) Darnell Wilson	UD	6	30/06/2007	(United States) Hollywood, Florida, U.S.	
Win	12-7-1	(United States) Sam Tillman	KO	2	09/07/2005	(United States) Pompano Beach, Florida, U.S.	Tillman knocked out at 1:03 of the second round.
Win	31-14-1	(United States) Lionel Butler	TKO	2	09/09/2003	(United States) Miami, Florida, U.S.	Referee stopped the bout at 1:53 of the second round.
Win	16-7-3	(United States) Ron Guerrero	TKO	1	02/08/2003	(United States) Walker, Minnesota, U.S.	Referee stopped the bout at 3:00 of the first round.
Loss	39-4-1	(United States) Jeremy Williams	UD	10	10/06/2003	(United States) Corpus Christi, Texas, U.S.	
Win	12-5	(United States) Wade Lewis	KO	2	06/03/2003	(United States) Miami, Florida, U.S.	Lewis knocked out at 3:00 of the second round.
Win	22-3-1	(United States) Crawford Grimsley	TKO	3	07/09/2002	Prague, Czech Republic	
Win	9-12-2	(United States) Joe Lenhart	TKO	5	25/05/2002	(United States) Tampa, Florida, U.S.	Referee stopped the bout at 2:28 of the fifth round.
Loss	21-2-2	(Cuba) Elieser Castillo	KO	5	04/01/2002	(United States) Miami, Florida, U.S.	Purlette knocked out at 2:58 of the fifth round.
Win	13-1-1	(United States) Jeremy Bates	TKO	2	05/10/2001	(United States) Miami Beach, Florida, U.S.	WBO NABO heavyweight title. Referee stopped the bout at 1:29 of the second round.
Win	35-12	(New Zealand) Jimmy Thunder	TKO	2	06/07/2001	(United States) Reno, Nevada, U.S.	Referee stopped the bout at 1:01 of the second round.
Win	5-8-1	(United States) Muhammad Raheem	TKO	3	01/05/2001	(United States) Memphis, Tennessee, U.S.	
Win	12-19-1	(United States) Craig Payne	TKO	2	10/02/2001	(United States) Miami, Florida, U.S.	
Win	17-24-2	(United States) Garing Lane	PTS	6	12/08/2000	(United States) Miami, Florida, U.S.	
Win	14-8	(Ivory Coast) Onebo Maxime	TKO	3	29/07/2000	(United States) Tunica, Mississippi, U.S.	Referee stopped the bout at 3:00 of the third round.
Win	2-9	(United States) Louis Gallucci	KO	1	23/06/2000	(United States) Tampa, Florida, U.S.	Gallucci knocked out at 1:15 of the first round.
Win	12-22-1	(United States) Charlie Dean Moore	TKO	4	18/06/1999	(United States) Ocala, Florida, U.S.	Referee stopped the bout at 1:07 of the third round.
Win	8-16	(United States) Andre Sherrod	KO	1	21/05/1999	(United States) Greensboro, North Carolina, U.S.	Sherrod knocked out at 1:45 of the first round.
Win	14-5	(United States) Fred Houpe	TKO	2	05/12/1998	(United States) Miami, Florida, U.S.	Referee stopped the bout at 2:47 of the second round.
Win	10-15	(United States) Cliff Nellon	UD	4	16/10/1998	(United States) Fort Lauderdale, Florida, U.S.	
Win	13-16	(United States) Jeff Williams	KO	8	15/11/1997	(United States) Lake Worth, Florida, U.S.	
Win	2-12	(United States) Ken Moody	TKO	2	09/08/1997	(United States) Homestead, Florida, U.S.	
Win	14-85-2	(United States) Frankie Hines	KO	2	29/07/1997	(United States) Nashville, Tennessee, U.S.	
Win	1-4	(United States) Ed Mosley	TKO	3	25/04/1997	(United States) Miami, Florida, U.S.	
Win	4-11-1	(United States) Kenneth Myers	TKO	3	10/04/1997	(United States) Norfolk, Virginia, U.S.	
Win	0-1	(United States) Oscar Silva	TKO	1	14/03/1997	(United States) Miami, Florida, U.S.	
Win	7-8-1	(United States) Ken McCurdy	KO	1	21/02/1997	(United States) Miami, Florida, U.S.	
Win	4-5-3	(United States) Elton Singleton	TKO	4	23/11/1996	(United States) Homestead, Florida, U.S.	
Win	16-7-3	(United States) Bill Medei	KO	1	30/08/1996	(United States) Miami, Florida, U.S.	NBA Cruiserweight Title
Win	6-10	(United States) Stanley Hughey	KO	1	29/07/1996	(United States) Hallandale, Florida, U.S.	
Win	5-17	(United States) Willie Driver	TKO	5	26/04/1996	(United States) Miami, Florida, U.S.	
Win	8-8-2	(United States) Fred Adams	TKO	2	26/03/1996	(United States) Immokalee, Florida, U.S.	
Win	1-6	(United States) David Fields	TKO	3	25/02/1995	Georgetown, Guyana	
Win	5-2	(Colombia) Faustino Gonzalez	KO	2	16/10/1994	Georgetown, Guyana	
Win	11-18	(United States) Tim St Clair	KO	2	26/06/1994	Georgetown, Guyana	
Win	1-1	(Guyana) George Allison	TKO	8	22/02/1994	Georgetown, Guyana	
Win	4-4	(Guyana) Ivor Simmons	TKO	2	07/11/1993	Georgetown, Guyana	
Win	1-3	(Guyana) Vidal Rawlins	DQ	4	01/10/1993	Georgetown, Guyana	
Win	3-1	(Guyana) Colin Murray	TKO	1	18/09/1993	Georgetown, Guyana	
Win	1-4	(Guyana) Leon O'Neal	TKO	1	28/02/1993	Georgetown, Guyana	
Win	--	(Guyana) Alberto Ellis	KO	1	26/12/1992	Georgetown, Guyana	
