= Gary Gomez =

American boxer

Personal information
- Nickname: Pit Bull
- Born: September 25, 1974 (age 51) Butte, Montana, U.S.
- Height: 5 ft 10 in (178 cm)
- Weight: Cruiserweight

Boxing career
- Stance: Orthodox

Boxing record
- Total fights: 34
- Wins: 19
- Win by KO: 7
- Losses: 13
- Draws: 2

Gary Gomez (born September 25, 1974) is an American former professional boxer who competed from 2001 to 2011. On December 4, 2005, he won the WBC Continental Americas cruiserweight title, defeating the undefeated champion Chad Van Sickle. He lost the title to Charles Davis on July 21 of the next year.

In April 2005 he was ranked as the 20th cruiserweight, and was the only national titleholder from Utah.

== Professional record ==
19 Wins (7 knockouts), 13 Losses (1 knockouts), 2 Draw
Res.	Record	Opponent	Type	Rd., Time	Date	Location	Notes
Loss	19–13–1	Andres Taylor	UD	8	2011-11-23	Stage AE, Pittsburgh, Pennsylvania, U.S.	
Loss	19–12–1	Jonte Willis	UD	7	2011-08-12	Silver Reef Casino, Ferndale, Washington, U.S.	
Win	19–11–2	Valente Tinajero	UD	8	2010-12-04	Golden Spike Coliseum, Ogden, Utah, U.S.	Won vacant USA Utah State cruiserweight title
Draw	18–11–2	Mike Mollo	MD	8	2010-08-06	UIC Pavilion, Chicago, Illinois, U.S.	
Loss	18–11–1	Ran Nakash	UD	8	2009-10-02	The Blue Horizon, Philadelphia, Pennsylvania, U.S.	
Loss	18–10–1	Tomasz Adamek	RTD	7 (10), 0:01	2008-07-11	Aragon Ballroom, Chicago, Illinois, U.S.	
Loss	18–9–1	Jeremy Williams	SD	8	2007-08-18	Sandy, Utah, U.S.	
Loss	14–5	Charles Davis	UD	10	2005-07-21	Madison Square Garden, New York, New York, U.S.	Lost WBC Continental Americas cruiserweight title
Win	13–4	Chad Van Sickle	MD	10	2004-12-04	Emerald Queen Casino, Tacoma, Washington, U.S.	Won WBC Continental Americas cruiserweight title
Win	10–3	Michael Sams	TKO	6 (10), 1:22	2004-03-27	Swinomish Northern Lights Casino, Anacortes, Washington, U.S.	Won GBU cruiserweight title
Loss	3–1	Felix Cora Jr.	UD	8	2002-06-27	Santa Ana Star Casino, Bernalillo, New Mexico, U.S.	
Win	3–0	Behnam Shahvandi	PTS	4	2001-11-25	Stateline Casino, West Wendover, Nevada, U.S.	
Win	2–0	Derrick Johnson	TKO	3	2001-10-20	West Wendover, Nevada, U.S.	
Win	1–0	Marcio Castillo	TKO	2 (4), 1:38	2001-09-23	Stateline Casino, West Wendover, Nevada, U.S.	
