= Mike Marrone =

American boxer (born 1985)

Michael Marrone
Personal information
- Nationality: American
- Born: 24 September 1985 (age 41) Vero Beach, Florida, U.S.
- Height: 6 ft 3 in (191 cm)
- Weight: Heavyweight; Cruiserweight

Boxing career
- Reach: 76 in (193 cm)
- Stance: Orthodox

Boxing record
- Total fights: 32
- Wins: 21
- Win by KO: 15
- Losses: 12

Michael Marrone (born September 24, 1985) is an American former professional boxer who competed from 2004 to 2020. He challenged once for the WBA cruiserweight title in 2011.

== Beginnings and amateur ==
As a child Marrone frequented the gym of the Duva family in Florida. He became close to Lou Duva who promoted and represented Marrone. At the National Golden Gloves tournament in 2003 he competed at Heavyweight with 201 lbs limit. He went up to super heavyweight and beat Mike Wilson in the PAL tournament 2003. In the finals he was outpointed by George Garcia, however. His amateur record was 42–9.

== Professional career ==
He turned pro in 2004 at age 18. Marrone's record as of October 2011 is 20-3-0 with 15 knockouts. Marrone scored a victory in April 2007 with an eight-round majority decision against previously undefeated Malachy Farrell in Atlantic City. In May 2008, he lost to Francesco Pianeta in Germany, in two rounds.

In June 2010, Marrone returned to the ring in Miami Beach, FL and scored a fifth round tko against Joseph Rabotte at the Deauville Beach Resort. He lost to Guillermo Jones in a match for the WBA Cruiserweight belt on November 5, 2011. The fight ended in the sixth round, when Marrone's corner asked the referee to stop the fight.

He was set to fight former WBO heavyweight champion Shannon Briggs on September 5, 2015, at the Seminole Hard Rock Hotel & Casino Hollywood in Hollywood, Florida, and eventually lost the fight via KO in the second round.

He was next set to face former heavyweight prospect Chazz Witherspoon at Grundy Arena in Bristol, Florida. After being floored two times in the first round, Marrone was again floored in the second round. Marrone, who was not able to recover from the first knockdown, stood up again, but his corner threw in the towel.

Marrone is currently managed by Jack Luce and trained by Eddie Chambers, Sr. Previously managed and trained by Gus Curren (House of Champions) in Vero Beach.

== Professional boxing record ==
30 fights	21 wins	9 losses
By knockout	15	8
By decision	5	1
By disqualification	1	0
Draws	0	
No contests	0	

Result	Record	Opponent	Type	Round	Date	Location	Notes
Loss	21-9	(Kazakhstan) Ivan Dychko	TKO	1 (8)	2018-06-16	(United States) Coliseum, Saint Petersburg	
Loss	21-8	(United States) Charles Martin	TKO	1 (10)	2017-07-18	(United States) Rapides Coliseum, Alexandria	
Loss	21-7	(Canada) Simon Kean	TKO	1 (8)	2017-04-06	(Canada) Metropolis, Montreal	
Loss	21-6	(United States) Chazz Witherspoon	TKO	2 (6)	2016-08-06	(United States) Grundy Arena, Bristol, Florida, U.S.	
Loss	21-5	(United States) Shannon Briggs	KO	2 (10)	2015-09-05	(United States) Seminole Hard Rock Hotel and Casino, Hollywood, Florida, U.S.	
Win	21-4	(United States) Robert Dunton	SD	6	2014-09-20	(United States) The Mela Room, Orlando, Florida, U.S.	
Loss	20-4	(Panama) Guillermo Jones	TKO	6	2011-11-05	(United States) Seminole Hard Rock Hotel and Casino, Hollywood, Florida, U.S.	WBA Cruiserweight Title. Referee stopped the bout at 1:55 of the sixth round.
Win	20-3	(United States) James Pratt	KO	1	2011-09-17	(United States) Rec Center, Wilson, North Carolina, U.S.	Pratt knocked out at 1:30 of the first round.
Loss	19-3	(United States) DaVarryl Williamson	KO	7	2011-04-23	(United States) Nokia Theatre L.A. Live, U.S.	Marrone knocked out at 2:30 of the seventh round.
Loss	19-2	(United States) Darrel Madison	UD	10	2010-12-17	(United States) American Airlines Arena, Miami, Florida, U.S.	
Win	19-1	(United States) Joseph Rabotte	TKO	5	2010-06-19	(United States) Deauville Beach Resort, Miami, Florida, U.S.	Referee stopped the bout at 1:49 of the fifth round.
Loss	18-1	(Italy) Francesco Pianeta	TKO	2	2008-05-17	Oberfrankenhalle, Bayreuth, Germany	WBC Youth Heavyweight Title. Referee stopped the bout at 1:23 of the second round.
Win	18-0	(United States) Malachy Farrell	MD	8	2007-04-20	(United States) Bally's Atlantic City, Atlantic City, New Jersey, U.S.	
Win	17-0	(United States) Jermell Barnes	UD	6	2007-02-23	(United States) Catholic Youth Center, Scranton, Pennsylvania, U.S.	
Win	16-0	(United States) Ronald Bellamy	TKO	3	2006-12-09	(United States) Seminole Hard Rock Hotel and Casino, Hollywood, Florida, U.S.	Referee stopped the bout at 2:48 of the third round.
Win	15-0	(United States) Ralph West	TKO	3	Sep 2, 2006	(United States) Staples Center, U.S.	Referee stopped the bout at 0:55 of the third round.
Win	14-0	(United States) Dan Whetzel	TKO	1	2006-04-28	(United States) Mohegan Sun Casino, Uncasville, Connecticut, U.S.	Referee stopped the bout at 1:00 of the first round.
Win	13-0	(United States) Zack Page	MD	8	2006-02-24	(United States) Turning Stone Casino, Verona, New York, U.S.	
Win	12-0	(United States) Curtis Taylor	TKO	1	2005-12-15	(United States) Seminole Hard Rock Hotel and Casino, Hollywood, Florida, U.S.	Referee stopped the bout at 2:06 of the first round.
Win	11-0	(United States) Adam Smith	DQ	4	2005-09-24	(United States) Boardwalk Hall, Atlantic City, New Jersey, U.S.	Smith disqualified at 0:45 of the fourth round.
Win	10-0	(United States) Forrest Nea	RTD	3	2005-07-02	(United States) Reno Events Center, Reno, Nevada, U.S.	Neal retired at 3:00 of the third round.
Win	9-0	(United States) Cliff Nellon	KO	1	2005-05-27	(United States) Westin Diplomat Resort, Hollywood, Florida, U.S.	Nellon knocked out at 1:11 of the first round.
Win	8-0	(Ukraine) Andriy Ivanov	KO	2	2005-04-08	(United States) Club Med, Port Saint Lucie, Florida, U.S.	Ivanov knocked out at 0:11 of the second round.
Win	7-0	(Puerto Rico) Joseph Kenneth Reyes	UD	6	2005-01-28	(United States) Tropicana Hotel & Casino, Atlantic City, New Jersey, U.S.	
Win	6-0	(United States) James Daniels	KO	1	2004-11-11	(United States) Hilton Washington, Washington, District of Columbia, U.S.	
Win	5-0	(United States) Stanley Taylor	TKO	1	2004-09-30	(United States) Olympic Auditorium, Los Angeles, California, U.S.	Referee stopped the bout at 0:54 of the first round.
Win	4-0	(United States) Mike Johnson	TKO	1	2004-08-05	(United States) Seminole Hard Rock Hotel and Casino, Hollywood, Florida, U.S.	Referee stopped the bout at 0:45 of the first round.
Win	3-0	(United States) Michael Moncrief	TKO	1	2004-07-10	(United States) Caesars Tahoe, Stateline, Nevada, U.S.	Referee stopped the bout at 0:23 of the first round.
Win	2-0	(United States) Rodney Collins	TKO	1	2004-06-11	(United States) Turning Stone Casino, Verona, New York, U.S.	Referee stopped the bout at 2:30 of the first round.
Win	1-0	(United States) Tracy Williams	TKO	2	2004-03-26	(United States) Miccosukee, Miami, Florida, U.S.	
