= Adeleye =

Adélẹ́yẹ is a surname of Yoruba origin, and meaning "the crown or royal one has dignity or honour". Notable people with the surname include:

- David Adeleye (born 1996), British boxer
- Dele Adeleye (born 1988), Nigerian footballer
- John Adeleye (born 1980), English singer
- Ryan Adeleye (born 1987), American-Israeli soccer player
