= Eliecer Castillo =

Cuban boxer (born 1970)

Elieser Castillo
Personal information
- Born: Elieser Ramos Castillo; October 25, 1970 (age 55) Havana, Cuba
- Height: 6 ft 2 in (188 cm)
- Weight: Heavyweight

Boxing career
- Reach: 75 in (191 cm)
- Stance: Southpaw

Boxing record
- Total fights: 43
- Wins: 32
- Win by KO: 18
- Losses: 9
- Draws: 2

Elieser Ramos Castillo (born October 25, 1970) is a Cuban professional boxer in the heavyweight division.

== Amateur career ==
Elieser Castillo Ramos was part of the legendary Cuban boxing program before he defected to the United States.

== Defecting to the US ==
In 1994, Castillo escaped from Cuba on a raft with his brothers Eliseo (a fellow boxer) and Eliades and two other friends. Castillo strung together three inner tubes and at the age of 24, made his float to freedom; taking only the clothes on his back and some drinking water. The group spent five days at sea before they drifted ashore in Panama. Soon thereafter, they were returned to Guantanamo Bay. After 18 months of processing the group was allowed to emigrate to the United States. He then moved to Miami, Florida.

== Professional career ==
On February 20, 1996, Castillo made his professional boxing debut in Miami, Florida with a first-round TKO win over Kerry Parks. In fact, four of Castillo's first five pro opponents didn’t make it out of the opening round, and with an aggressive style and south paw power; Elieser quickly became a fan favorite in his adopted home of South Florida.

By his ninth fight, Castillo was already fighting for and winning professional titles as he demolished 85-fight veteran Bobby Crabtree in just two rounds to win the WBC Continental Americas title in 1996. A 12-round decision win over Artis Pendergrass two months later put the WBC Fecarbox title belt around his waist, and after four more victories during 1997 and 1998, Castillo appeared to be unstoppable.

On May 30, 1998, Castillo was matched up with highly regarded and unbeaten heavyweight contender Chris Byrd. In a highly anticipated clash between two of the sport's rising young stars, Byrd outpointed Castillo over ten rounds in Atlantic City. Six months later, Castillo was back in the ring and back on another winning streak, taking care of seven straight opponents over the next two years.

On October 21, 2000, Castillo earned his first title belt as a heavyweight, over hard-hitting 300-pound Paea Wolfgramm during 12 tough rounds, to win the IBO Intercontinental crown. Castillo was considered the underdog when he took on 32-0 Andre Purlette on January 4, 2002. Castillo dismantled the unbeaten Purlette, knocking him out in five rounds.

The momentum from the win over Purlette was lost when Castillo dropped a hard-fought 12 round decision to Charles Shufford in October 2002, but eight months later, fighting at his lightest weight since 1997, Castillo bounced back like a champion, knocking out former US Olympian Lawrence Clay-Bey in nine rounds to win the NABF championship.

Castillo's next fight was dubbed: David vs- Goliath as he was pinned up against Corey Sanders, who weighed 85 pounds more than the Cuban southpaw. Castillo retained his NABF belt, beating Sanders. Castillo later knocked out former Cruiserweight World Champion Uriah Grant in the first round.

A few months later Castillo faced a defeat during a 12 round war to DaVarryl Williamson on April 17, 2004, a bout in which Castillo sent Williamson to the canvas in round eight. A close decision loss to Kendrick Releford in October 2004 surprised boxing fans, but with a new attitude for 2005, Castillo was ready to get back into the title mix. On April 22, 2005, he faced crafty veteran Otis Tisdale. It was a bout that looked to be competitive on paper, but once the bell rang, it was all Castillo, as he stopped his foe at the 2:43 mark of the opening round.

On October 9, 2009 after a year and six months he fought journeyman Charles Davis and was defeated by unanimous decision after six rounds.

== Professional boxing record ==
43 fights	32 wins	9 losses
By knockout	18	0
By decision	14	9
Draws	2	

No.	Result	Record	Opponent	Type	Round, time	Date	Location	Notes
43	Loss	32–9–2	(Ecuador) Ítalo Perea	UD	6	09/06/2017	(United States) Scala Bay Club, Miami, Florida, U.S.	
42	Loss	32–8–2	(United States) Trevor Bryan	UD	6	24/10/2014	(United States) Civic Center, Kissimmee, Florida, U.S.	
41	Win	32–7–2	(United States) Willie Chisolm	TKO	3	14/12/2013	(United States) Scala Bay Club, Miami, Florida, U.S.	
40	Win	31–7–2	(United States) Marlon Hayes	UD	4	22/11/2013	(United States) Southeastern Livestock Pavilion, Ocala, Florida, U.S.	
39	Loss	30–7–2	(United States) Charles Davis	UD	6	09/10/2009	(United States) Club Destiny, Orlando, Florida, U.S.	
38	Win	30–6–2	(United States) Lenzie Morgan	TKO	6	21/02/2008	(United States) Miami Beach Gardens, Miami Beach, Florida, U.S.	Referee stopped the bout at 2:48 of the sixth round.
37	Loss	29–6–2	(Puerto Rico) Fres Oquendo	UD	10	20/07/2007	(United States) Mahi Temple Shrine Auditorium, Miami, Florida, U.S.	WBC/WBO Latino Heavyweight Titles.
36	Win	29–5–2	(United States) Lenzie Morgan	UD	10	30/03/2007	(United States) Rapides Parish Coliseum, Alexandria, Louisiana, U.S.	
35	Win	28–5–2	(The Bahamas) Reynaldo Minus	KO	4	08/04/2006	(United States) USF Sundome, Tampa, Florida, U.S.	Minus knocked out at 2:11 of the fourth round.
34	Win	27–5–2	(United States) Otis Tisdale	TKO	1	22/04/2005	(United States) Seminole Hard Rock Hotel and Casino, Hollywood, Florida, U.S.	Referee stopped the bout at 2:43 of the first round.
33	Loss	26–5–2	(United States) Kendrick Releford	UD	12	28/10/2004	(United States) Seminole Hard Rock Hotel and Casino, Hollywood, Florida, U.S.	WBO Latino Heavyweight Title.
32	Loss	26–4–2	(United States) DaVarryl Williamson	MD	12	17/04/2004	(United States) Florida State Fairgrounds Hall, East Lake-Orient Park, Florida, U.S.	WBO Latino/NABF Heavyweight Titles.
31	Win	26–3–2	(Jamaica) Uriah Grant	KO	1	17/01/2004	(United States) Seminole Casino, Coconut Creek, Florida, U.S.	Grant retired after the bout.
30	Win	25–3–2	(United States) Corey Sanders	UD	12	30/10/2003	(United States) Seminole Casino, Coconut Creek, Florida, U.S.	NABF Heavyweight Title.
29	Win	24–3–2	(United States) Lawrence Clay-Bey	KO	9	06/06/2003	(United States) Mohegan Sun Arena, Uncasville, Connecticut, U.S.	NABF Heavyweight Title.
28	Loss	23–3–2	(United States) Charles Shufford	UD	12	13/10/2002	(United States) Silver Star Casino, Philadelphia, Mississippi, U.S.	IBA Americas Heavyweight Title.
27	Win	23–2–2	(United States) Willie Palms	MD	6	07/06/2002	(United States) Caesars Palace, Paradise, Nevada, U.S.	
26	Win	22–2–2	(Guyana) Andre Purlette	KO	5	04/01/2002	(United States) American Airlines Arena, Miami, Florida, U.S.	Purlette knocked out at 2:58 of the fifth round.
25	Draw	21–2–2	(United States) Fred Adams	TD	2	03/11/2001	(United States) Miccosukee Resort & Gaming, Miami, Florida, U.S.	
24	Win	21–2–1	(Ivory Coast) Onebo Maxime	TKO	2	29/09/2001	(United States) Miccosukee Resort & Gaming, Miami, Florida, U.S.	
23	Loss	20–2–1	(United States) Tim Witherspoon	MD	10	31/03/2001	(United States) Ballys Park Place, Atlantic City, New Jersey, U.S.	
22	Win	20–1–1	(Tonga) Paea Wolfgramm	SD	12	21/10/2000	(United States) Silver Star Casino, Philadelphia, Mississippi, U.S.	IBO Intercontinental Heavyweight Title.
21	Win	19–1–1	(United States) Ross Puritty	UD	10	20/08/2000	(United States) Casino Queen, East St. Louis, Illinois, U.S.	
20	Win	18–1–1	(United States) Frankie Swindell	UD	10	06/04/2000	(United States) Coeur d'Alene Casino, Worley, Idaho, U.S.	
19	Draw	17–1–1	(Russia) Alexander Zolkin	PTS	10	13/01/2000	(United States) Casino Magic, Bay St. Louis, Mississippi, U.S.	
18	Win	17–1	(United States) Frankie Swindell	UD	10	04/11/1999	(United States) Coeur d'Alene Casino, Worley, Idaho, U.S.	
17	Win	16–1	(United States) Louis Monaco	UD	8	30/01/1999	(United States) Boardwalk Hall, Atlantic City, New Jersey, U.S.	
16	Win	15–1	(Puerto Rico) Miguel Otero	UD	8	13/11/1998	(United States) Mahi Temple Shrine Auditorium, Miami, Florida, U.S.	
15	Loss	14–1	(United States) Chris Byrd	UD	10	30/05/1998	(United States) Ballys Park Place, Atlantic City, New Jersey, U.S.	
14	Win	14–0	(United States) Marcus Harden	KO	2	13/03/1998	(United States) Miccosukee Resort & Gaming, Miami, Florida, U.S.	
13	Win	13–0	(Cuba) Omar Gutierrez	PTS	8	14/12/1997	Fajardo, Puerto Rico	
12	Win	12–0	(United States) Fred Adams	KO	1	22/08/1997	(United States) Seville Beach Hotel, Miami Beach, Florida, U.S.	
11	Win	11–0	(United States) Matthew Charleston	KO	1	08/05/1997	(United States) Anatole Hotel, Dallas, Texas, U.S.	
10	Win	10–0	(United States) Artis Pendergrass	UD	12	03/01/1997	(United States) Milander Auditorium, Hialeah, Florida, U.S.	WBC FECARBOX Cruiserweight Title.
9	Win	9–0	(United States) Bobby Crabtree	TKO	2	01/11/1996	(United States) Coconut Grove Convention Center, Miami, Florida, U.S.	WBC Continental Americas Cruiserweight Title.
8	Win	8–0	(United States) Elwood Bartlett	TKO	2	27/09/1996	(United States) Tropicana Casino & Resort, Atlantic City, New Jersey, U.S.	
7	Win	7–0	(United States) John Kiser	SD	8	10/08/1996	(United States) Aladdin Hotel & Casino, Paradise, Nevada, U.S.	
6	Win	6–0	(United States) Tyrone Castell	TKO	5	29/06/1996	(United States) Aladdin Hotel & Casino, Paradise, Nevada, U.S.	
5	Win	5–0	(United States) Ed Mosley	KO	1	25/05/1996	(United States) Seville Beach Hotel, Miami Beach, Florida, U.S.	
4	Win	4–0	(United States) James Flowers	KO	1	27/04/1996	(United States) Mahi Temple Shrine Auditorium, Miami, Florida, U.S.	
3	Win	3–0	(United States) Wesley Martin	UD	4	15/03/1996	(United States) Aladdin Hotel & Casino, Paradise, Nevada, U.S.	
2	Win	2–0	(United States) Mike Stover	KO	1	24/02/1996	(United States) Seville Beach Hotel, Miami Beach, Florida, U.S.	
1	Win	1–0	(United States) Kerry Parks	TKO	1	20/02/1996	(United States) Mahi Temple Shrine Auditorium, Miami, Florida, U.S.	

Sporting positions
Regional boxing titles
New title	NABF Heavyweight champion Interim title June 6, 2003 – 2003; Promoted to full champion	Vacant
Preceded by Joe Mesi; Stripped	NABF Heavyweight champion 2003 – April 17, 2004	Succeeded by DaVarryl Williamson
