= DaVarryl Williamson =

American boxer (born 1968)

Personal information
- Nickname: Touch Of Sleep
- Born: DaVarryl Jerome Williamson; July 25, 1968 (age 58) Washington, D.C., U.S.
- Height: 6 ft 4 in (193 cm)
- Weight: Heavyweight

Boxing career
- Reach: 80 in (203 cm)
- Stance: Orthodox

Boxing record
- Total fights: 35
- Wins: 27
- Win by KO: 23
- Losses: 8
- Draws: 0

DaVarryl Jerome Williamson (born July 25, 1968) is an American former professional boxer. A highly-touted amateur, he challenged once for the IBF world heavyweight title in 2005.

== Early and personal life ==
Williamson was raised in poverty in the inner city Washington D.C., born to a mother addicted to drugs and a criminal father. He spent his youth moving between foster homes and between schools until his father chose to resume contact at the age of 11. An accomplished high school football star, he attended Rochester Community and Technical College in Minnesota on a scholarship. Williamson later transferred on a scholarship to play for NCAA Division II Wayne State College in Nebraska, graduating in 1993.

He is married to Jennifer Williamson.

== Boxing career ==
=== Amateur career ===
Williamson started boxing as an amateur at the age of 25. In January 1995, he received an offer to join the U.S. Olympic Education Center in Marquette, Michigan, in order to qualify at the 1996 Summer Olympics. Williamson failed to qualify, but joined the team as an alternate. Standing 6 ft 4 in tall, Williamson gained popularity for his punching power, mainly for his clubbing right-hand haymaker, which became known as "Touch of Sleep". As an amateur, Williamson won the National Golden Gloves heavyweight championships in 1996 and 1999, and United States national amateur championships in 1996, 1997 and 1998 and built a record of 120 wins, 17 losses and 1 draw, with 103 wins coming by knockout (88% KO rate).

=== Highlights ===
1996 Olympic Trials Heavyweight

- Defeated Harold Sconiers KO 1
- Defeated David Washington KO
- Lost to Nate Jones on points

1996 Challengers Olympics Heavyweight

- Defeated Lamon Brewster on points

1996 Olympics Heavyweight Box-Offs

- Lost to Nate Jones on points

1997 United States Heavyweight Championships

- Defeated James Jackson KO 1
- Defeated Terry Smith KO 2
- Defeated Calvin Brock KO 3

1997 World Championships in Budapest (Heavyweight)

- Defeated Garth da Silva (N-Z) on points
- Lost to Mark Simmons] (Can) on points

1998 Tournament in Tampere, Finland (Heavyweight)

- Defeated Kai Brankarr (Fin) TKO 1

1998 United States Heavyweight Championships

- Defeated Sam Sleezer TKO 2
- Defeated Kevin Montly TKO 1
- Defeated Stanley McClain KO 3
- Defeated Calvin Brock on points

1998 Goodwill Games (Heavyweight)

- Defeated Mocerino KO 1
- Defeated Kshinin KO 2
- Lost to Félix Savón (Cub) KO 1

1999: United States Heavyweight Championships

- Defeated Sifou Sua KO 4
- Lost to Jason Estrada on points

1999: Golden Gloves (Heavyweight)

- Defeated Devin Vargas KO
- Defeated Patrick Nuwamu KO
- Defeated Jason Estrada on points
- Defeated Jeremiah Muhammad KO 2
- Defeated Michael Bennett (boxer) KO 2

1999 Multi-National Tournament in Liverpool, England (Heavyweight:)

- Defeated Kevin Evans (Gal) TKO
- Lost to Garth Da Silva (N-Z) on points

2000 Olympic Trials Heavyweight

- Defeated Anthony Stewart points
- Defeated Mike Kirkman points
- Lost to Michael Bennett (boxer) points

2000 Challengers Round Olympic Trials Heavyweight

- Lost to Malik Scott points

== Professional career ==
Williamson made his professional debut in 2000 at the age of 32. He won his first eighteen fights out of 19, with 16 of them by knockout (KO) inside the first five rounds before facing another undefeated hard-hitting heavyweight Joe Mesi. In the opening minute, Mesi hit Williamson with a right-left combination, unleashing a barrage of punches which ultimately put Williamson down. Davarryl was not able to get up at the count of ten, declaring Mesi the winner by first-round KO.

Afterwards, Williamson defeated Kendrick Releford by fifth-round TKO and Cuban contender Eliecer Castillo by majority decision before facing Wladimir Klitschko. The fight took place at Caesars Palace in Las Vegas, Nevada. Williamson dropped Klitschko forty seconds into the fourth round, but was unable to capitalize on it. An accidental head butt in the closing seconds of the fifth round caused Klitschko bleeding from a cut above his right eye. Due to the cut, the fight was prematurely stopped, with Klitschko being declared the winner by technical decision. Two of the judges scored the fight identically 49–46 in favor of Klitschko, while the third judge had Williamson winning 48–47.

Just one month after the bout, Williamson defeated former world champion, 39-year old Oliver McCall, who was on the comeback trail and lost 19 lbs for this bout, by unanimous decision. He then faced former world title challenger Derrick Jefferson less than three months later, stopping him in the second round. Both fights took place at Madison Square Garden. Following the win over Jefferson, Williamson received a title shot against Chris Byrd for the IBF world heavyweight title. The bout took place in Reno, Nevada, and was the main event of Don King's card that included James Toney fighting Dominick Guinn. The fight, which some observers expected to be "explosive", was marked by a series of feints and clinches. The bout went full twelve rounds, with Byrd being declared the winner by unanimous decision, with two judges scoring the fight 116–112 and one judge scoring it 115–113. The end of the fight was followed with boos from the crowd. Following the fight it was revealed Williamson had postponed elbow surgery.

Following the loss, Williamson won two fights, beating journeyman Maurice Wheeler and undefeated prospect Mike Mollo within four rounds each, before facing former world title challenger Kali Meehan on October 6, 2007 at Madison Square Garden. Williamson, who was 39 years old at the time, lost by sixth-round TKO. He got his last chance to fight for the title in 2009, facing Ray Austin in the WBC heavyweight title eliminator, but was stopped in the fourth round. After that, Williamson fought sporadically, having fought three times before retiring in 2014 after losing to Eric Molina at the age of 45.

== Professional boxing record ==
27 Wins (23 knockouts, 4 decisions), 8 Losses (6 knockouts, 2 decisions)
Result	Record	Opponent	Type	Round	Date	Location	Notes
Loss	27-8	(United States) Eric Molina	TKO	5	10/05/2014	(United States) USC Galen Center, Los Angeles	
Loss	27-7	(United States) Tony Grano	KO	4	23/06/2012	(United States) Seminole Hard Rock Hotel and Casino Hollywood, Hollywood, Florida	For WBC NABF Heavyweight Title
Win	27-6	(United States) Michael Marrone	KO	7	23/04/2011	(United States) Nokia Theatre L.A. Live, Los Angeles, California	Marrone knocked out at 2:30 of the seventh round.
Loss	26-6	(United States) Ray Austin	TKO	4	31/10/2009	(United States) Treasure Island Hotel and Casino, Las Vegas, Nevada	WBC World Heavyweight Title Eliminator. Referee stopped the bout at 2:37 of the fourth round.
Win	26-5	(United States) Carl Davis	TKO	5	24/04/2009	(United States) Scottrade Center, Saint Louis, Missouri	Referee stopped the bout at 2:52 of the fifth round.
Win	25-5	(United States) Cerrone Fox	TKO	2	18/09/2008	Figali Convention Center, Panama City	
Loss	24-5	(Australia) Kali Meehan	TKO	6	06/10/2007	(United States) Madison Square Garden, New York City	WBO NABO Heavyweight Title. Referee stopped the bout at the end of the sixth round.
Win	24-4	(United States) Maurice Wheeler	KO	3	06/07/2007	(United States) Florida State Fairgrounds, Tampa, Florida	Wheeler knocked out at 2:56 of the third round.
Win	23-4	(United States) Mike Mollo	TKO	4	06/05/2006	(United States) DCU Center, Worcester, Massachusetts	Referee stopped the bout at 2:59 of the fourth round.
Loss	22-4	(United States) Chris Byrd	UD	12	01/10/2005	(United States) Reno Events Center, Reno, Nevada	IBF World Heavyweight Title. 112-116, 113-115, 112-116.
Win	22-3	(United States) Derrick Jefferson	TKO	2	30/04/2005	(United States) Madison Square Garden, New York City	WBC Continental Americas/WBO NABO Heavyweight Titles. Referee stopped the bout at 2:41 of the second round.
Win	21-3	(United States) Oliver McCall	UD	10	13/11/2004	(United States) Madison Square Garden, New York City	96-94, 96-94, 97-94.
Loss	20-3	(Ukraine) Wladimir Klitschko	TD	5	02/10/2004	(United States) Caesars Palace, Las Vegas, Nevada	Bout was stopped due to an accidental headbutt. 46-49, 48-47, 46-49.
Win	20-2	(Cuba) Elieser Castillo	MD	12	17/04/2004	(United States) Florida State Fairgrounds, Tampa, Florida	WBC NABF/WBO Latino Heavyweight Titles. 115-111, 115-111, 113-113.
Win	19-2	(United States) Kendrick Releford	TKO	9	17/01/2004	(United States) Seminole Casino, Coconut Creek, Florida	Referee stopped the bout at 2:35 of the ninth round.
Loss	18-2	(United States) Joe Mesi	KO	1	27/09/2003	(United States) HSBC Arena, Buffalo, New York	Williamson knocked out at 1:37 of the first round.
Win	18-1	(United States) Robert Wiggins	UD	10	10/01/2003	(United States) Mohegan Sun, Uncasville, Connecticut	94-93, 97-90, 96-91.
Win	17-1	(United States) Corey Sanders	TKO	5	26/07/2002	(United States) Mountaineer Casino, Racetrack and Resort, Chester, West Virginia	Referee stopped the bout at the end of the fifth round.
Win	16-1	(United States) Dale Crowe	TKO	3	25/05/2002	(United States) Las Vegas Hilton, Las Vegas, Nevada	Referee stopped the bout at 2:26 of the third round.
Win	15-1	(United States) Abdul Muhaymin	TKO	3	13/04/2002	(United States) Mountaineer Casino, Racetrack and Resort, Chester, West Virginia	
Win	14-1	(United States) Ed White	TKO	1	29/03/2002	(United States) Denver Coliseum, Denver, Colorado	
Win	13-1	(Republic of Ireland) Kevin McBride	TKO	5	18/01/2002	(United States) Paris Las Vegas, Las Vegas, Nevada	Referee stopped the bout at 2:48 of the fifth round.
Win	12-1	(United States) Harold Sconiers	TKO	1	30/11/2001	(United States) Reno Hilton Casino Resort, Reno, Nevada	Referee stopped the bout at 2:59 of the first round.
Win	11-1	(Belarus) Andrei Kopilou	TKO	3	16/11/2001	(United States) The Orleans, Las Vegas, Nevada	Referee stopped the bout at 1:56 of the third round.
Win	10-1	(United States) Derrick Ryals	TKO	3	25/08/2001	(United States) Flamingo Hilton, Laughlin, Nevada	
Win	9-1	(United States) Antuan Shazell	TKO	2	04/08/2001	(United States) United Palace Theater, Washington Heights, Manhattan	
Win	8-1	(United States) Marvin Hunt	TKO	1	21/07/2001	(United States) Caesars Palace, Las Vegas, Nevada	
Win	7-1	(United States) Antonio Colbert	TKO	1	06/07/2001	(United States) Reno Hilton Casino Resort, Reno, Nevada	Referee stopped the bout at 2:00 of the first round.
Win	6-1	(Jamaica) Leroy Berbick	TKO	2	25/05/2001	(United States) Norfolk, Virginia	Referee stopped the bout at 2:19 of the second round.
Win	5-1	(United States) Bradley Rone	UD	4	18/03/2001	(United States) Riviera Casino, Black Hawk, Colorado	
Win	4-1	(United States) John Ray Lewis	TKO	1	21/01/2001	(United States) Riviera Casino, Black Hawk, Colorado	
Loss	3-1	(United States) Willie Chapman	TKO	4	06/10/2000	(United States) Hard Rock Hotel and Casino, Las Vegas, Nevada	
Win	3-0	(United States) Ronnie Smith	RTD	2	24/08/2000	(United States) Coeur d'Alene Casino, Worley, Idaho	Smith retired at the end of the second round.
Win	2-0	(United States) Gregory Dial	KO	2	04/08/2000	(United States) Hard Rock Hotel and Casino, Las Vegas, Nevada	Dial knocked out at 2:18 of the second round.
Win	1-0	(United States) Paul Dowdy	TKO	1	30/06/2000	(United States) Denver Coliseum, Denver, Colorado	

== Accolades ==
- Williamson was inducted to Colorado Hall of Fame 2022
- National Golden Gloves Champion - 1996, 1999
- United States national amateur heavyweight champion – 1996, 1997, 1998 (first and only heavyweight to win the championships three times in a row)
- 10-Time National Amateur Boxing Champion
- Goodwill Games Silver Medalist - 1998
- U.S. Olympic Team - First Alternate - 1996
- U.S. Olympic Festival Champion - 1995
- American Boxing Classic Champion - 1995, 1996, 1999
- National Police Athletic League Champion - 1999
- His professional opponents have a combined record of 337–150–6

Preceded by Lamon Brewster	United States Amateur Heavyweight Champion; 1996-1998	Succeeded by Malik Scott
