= Monte Barrett =

American boxer

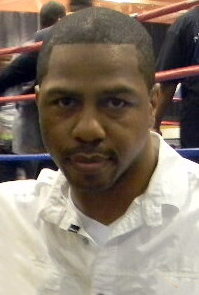
- Barrett in 2010

Personal information
- Nickname: Two Gunz
- Born: May 26, 1971 (age 55) Greenville, North Carolina, U.S.
- Height: 6 ft 3 in (191 cm)
- Weight: Heavyweight

Boxing career
- Reach: 78 in (198 cm)
- Stance: Orthodox

Boxing record
- Total fights: 48
- Wins: 35
- Win by KO: 20
- Losses: 11
- Draws: 2

Monte Barrett (born May 26, 1971) is an American former professional boxer who competed from 1996 to 2014. He challenged once for the WBA heavyweight title in 2006, and fought many top heavyweight champions and contenders during his career.

== Amateur career ==
Barrett had 40 amateur fights, finishing his amateur career with 37-3 record, signed a contract with Joe De Guardia and turned pro in 1996.

== Professional career ==
As a professional, Barrett had 21 consecutive wins before losing against Lance Whitaker on August 28, 1998. Later, he won a regional heavyweight title. Barrett fought Phil Jackson for the vacant WBC Continental Americas Heavyweight title on April 3, 1999. On July 15, 2000, Barrett rose 5 times against future International Boxing Federation heavyweight champion Wladimir Klitschko, but ultimately was knocked out after 3 knockdowns in the 7th round. He also fought contender Joe Mesi in a fight that saw both fighters go down but one in which, ultimately, Mesi prevailed by ten round majority decision. Barrett defeated prospects Dominick Guinn and Owen Beck, the latter in an elimination bout for a shot at either the IBF title (then held by Chris Byrd) or the WBC title (then held by Vitali Klitschko). After Klitschko injured his back, Barrett fought Hasim Rahman for the WBC interim title and lost by unanimous decision after 12 rounds.

Despite his loss, he fought World Boxing Association heavyweight champion Nikolay Valuev in October at Rosemont, Illinois. Barrett lost via technical knockout in the 11th round. Barrett was knocked down in the eighth and eleventh rounds, but managed to get up. After being knocked down for the second time in the eleventh round, his trainer, James Ali Basheer, jumped into the ring to stop the fight.

Barrett was beaten in the second round in a July 2007 bout against Cliff Couser. Barrett avenged this loss in a December 2007 rematch in which he stopped Couser in the second round. After knocking out Damon Reed, Barrett knocked out Tye Fields in the first round on June 28, 2008, his last win.

Barrett lost to former cruiserweight champion David Haye (who was also the promoter of the fight) on November 15, 2008, at the O2 arena in London, by knockout at 1:28 fifth round, after being put down five times in the fight. Haye then beat Nicolai Valuev, who had beaten Monte by an eleventh round stoppage in October 2006, to win the WBA's share of the world heavyweight title.

Monte fought Odlanier Solís on October 10, 2009, but lost by second round technical knockout. He then fought Alexander Ustinov on December 12, 2009 but lost a unanimous decision after 12 rounds.

On July 17, 2010 Barrett drew against David Tua. Tua dominated the early rounds through aggression, but Barrett took control in the later rounds and scored a knockdown in the 12th (knocking down Tua for the first time in his professional career). The bout resulted in a controversial draw (as a point was also deducted from Tua in round 12 for throwing Barrett to the canvas) with two judges scoring the fight 113–113 and the third a 115–111 result to Tua. On August 7, 2010, appearing ringside at a fight card at Aviator Arena in Brooklyn, New York, in a brief interview, Barrett confirmed his retirement from the ring and his intention to take a job offered to him in private industry. On August 21, 2010, Barrett entered the ring at The Prudential Center in Newark after IBF International heavyweight champion Tomas Adamek won a decision over Michael Grant. Seeking to come out of retirement, Barrett congratulated and challenged Adamek to a 12 round bout. However, after fighting to an eight round draw in Virginia with Charles Davis in January 2011, Barrett began training for a rematch with David Tua which was held in New Zealand. On August 13, 2011, Barrett defeated Tua via unanimous decision and won the WBO Asia Pacific and WBO Oriental Heavyweight titles. In December 2011, it emerged Monte Barrett tested positive for banned stimulant methylhex-anemine following a urine test after his August 13 points decision over the Kiwi-Samoan boxer. Blair Edwards Tua'a lawyer, called for action against the 40-year-old New Yorker requesting the return of Tua's WBO Asia-Pacific and Oriental titles and restoration of ranking points.

Barrett fought New Zealander Shane Cameron on July 5, 2012 with the winner becoming the number one contender to fight NZPBA title holder Sonny Bill Williams. Days before the fight he admitted the Shane Cameron fight would be "a challenge", but that was spurring him on to win. Barrett also stated that he would look for a third fight with David Tua, after he had beaten Cameron. However he was knocked out in the 4th round with a right hand and lost the titles that he had won against David Tua the previous year.

== Professional boxing record ==
48 fights	35 wins	11 losses
By knockout	20	7
By decision	15	4
Draws	2	

No.	Result	Record	Opponent	Type	Round, time	Date	Location	Notes
48	Loss	35–11–2	Luis Ortiz	KO	4 (10), 0:38	Apr 3, 2014	Fantasy Springs Resort Casino, Indio, California, U.S.	
47	Loss	35–10–2	Shane Cameron	KO	4 (12), 0:18	Jul 5, 2012	SkyCity, Auckland, New Zealand	Lost WBO Asia Pacific and WBO Oriental heavyweight titles
46	Win	35–9–2	David Tua	UD	12	Aug 13, 2011	TelstraClear Pacific Events Centre, Auckland, New Zealand	Won WBO Asia Pacific and WBO Oriental heavyweight titles
45	Draw	34–9–2	Charles Davis	MD	8	Jan 22, 2011	The Greenbrier, White Sulphur Springs, West Virginia, U.S.	
44	Draw	34–9–1	David Tua	MD	12	Jul 17, 2010	Tropicana Casino & Resort, Atlantic City, New Jersey, U.S.	For WBO Asia Pacific and WBO Oriental heavyweight titles
43	Loss	34–9	Alexander Ustinov	UD	12	Dec 12, 2009	PostFinance Arena, Bern, Switzerland	For vacant WBA International heavyweight title
42	Loss	34–8	Odlanier Solís	TKO	2 (10), 1:54	Oct 10, 2009	The Theater at Madison Square Garden, New York City, New York, U.S.	For WBC International heavyweight title
41	Loss	34–7	David Haye	TKO	5 (10), 1:28	Nov 15, 2008	The O2 Arena, London, England	
40	Win	34–6	Tye Fields	KO	1 (10), 0:57	Jun 28, 2008	Mandalay Bay Events Center, Paradise, Nevada, U.S.	
39	Win	33–6	Damon Reed	KO	2 (8), 2:47	Feb 2, 2008	944 Super Village, Scottsdale, Arizona, U.S.	
38	Win	32–6	Cliff Couser	TKO	2 (6), 2:16	Dec 6, 2007	Paradise Theater, New York City, New York, U.S.	
37	Loss	31–6	Cliff Couser	TKO	2 (10), 2:42	Jul 7, 2007	The Arena at Harbor Yard, Bridgeport, Connecticut, U.S.	
36	Loss	31–5	Nikolai Valuev	TKO	11 (12), 2:12	Oct 7, 2006	Allstate Arena, Rosemont, Illinois, U.S.	For WBA heavyweight title
35	Loss	31–4	Hasim Rahman	UD	12	Aug 13, 2005	United Center, Chicago, Illinois, U.S.	For WBC interim heavyweight title
34	Win	31–3	Owen Beck	TKO	9 (12), 2:52	Feb 5, 2005	Savvis Center, St. Louis, Missouri, U.S.	
33	Win	30–3	Dominick Guinn	SD	10	Mar 27, 2004	Alltel Arena, Little Rock, Arkansas, U.S.	
32	Loss	29–3	Joe Mesi	MD	10	Dec 6, 2003	Madison Square Garden, New York City, New York, U.S.	
31	Win	29–2	Eric Kirkland	TKO	10 (10), 2:34	Oct 3, 2003	Sandia Resort & Casino Albuquerque, Albuquerque, New Mexico, U.S.	
30	Win	28–2	Robert Wiggins	SD	10	Mar 8, 2003	Mohegan Sun Arena, Montville, Connecticut, U.S.	
29	Win	27–2	Terry Porter	UD	6	Mar 8, 2003	Marconi Automotive Museum, Tustin, California, U.S.	
28	Win	26–2	Robert Davis	UD	10	Sep 28, 2001	Caesars Palace, Paradise, Nevada, U.S.	
27	Win	25–2	Tim Witherspoon	SD	10	Jun 8, 2001	Turning Stone Resort Casino, Verona, New York, U.S.	
26	Win	24–2	Mario Cawley	TKO	9 (10), 2:34	Jan 7, 2001	Bally's Park Place, Atlantic City, New Jersey, U.S.	
25	Loss	23–2	Wladimir Klitschko	TKO	7 (10), 2:40	Jul 15, 2000	London Arena, London, England	
24	Win	23–1	Jimmy Thunder	TKO	7 (10), 0:52	Feb 24, 2000	Hammerstein Ballroom, New York City, New York, U.S.	
23	Win	22–1	Derrick Banks	UD	10	Jan 27, 2000	Hammerstein Ballroom, New York City, New York, U.S.	
22	Loss	21–1	Lance Whitaker	SD	12	Aug 28, 1999	The Joint, Paradise, Nevada, U.S.	Lost WBC Continental Americas heavyweight title
21	Win	21–0	Tim Ray	KO	1 (8), 1:31	Jul 25, 1999	Harrah's, North Kansas City, Missouri, U.S.	
20	Win	20–0	Phil Jackson	UD	12	Apr 3, 1999	New Frontier Hotel and Casino, Paradise, Nevada, U.S.	Won vacant WBC Continental Americas heavyweight title
19	Win	19–0	Greg Page	UD	10	Oct 23, 1998	Trump Marina, Atlantic City, New Jersey, U.S.	
18	Win	18–0	Bryant Smith	UD	10	Sep 11, 1998	Raceway, Yonkers, New York, U.S.	
17	Win	17–0	Derek Amos	TKO	8 (10)	Jun 19, 1998	Trump Marina, Atlantic City, New Jersey, U.S.	
16	Win	16–0	Louis Monaco	UD	6	May 9, 1998	Etess Arena, Atlantic City, New Jersey, U.S.	
15	Win	15–0	Jeff Pegues	TKO	1 (8)	Mar 27, 1998	Trump Marina, Atlantic City, New Jersey, U.S.	
14	Win	14–0	Guy Sonnenberg	TKO	4 (8), 2:30	Jan 16, 1998	Trump Plaza Hotel and Casino, Atlantic City, New Jersey, U.S.	
13	Win	13–0	Santiago De Paula	TKO	3 (8)	Nov 21, 1997	Raceway, Yonkers, New York, U.S.	
12	Win	12–0	Val Smith	TKO	6 (8)	Nov 1, 1997	Apollo Theater, New York City, New York, U.S.	
11	Win	11–0	Billy Lewis	KO	1 (6)	Oct 2, 1997	Virginia Beach, Virginia, U.S.	
10	Win	10–0	Kevin Brister	TKO	1 (6)	Jul 13, 1997	Raceway, Yonkers, New York, U.S.	
9	Win	9–0	Juan Quintana	PTS	6	May 17, 1997	Dover, New Hampshire, U.S.	
8	Win	8–0	Lee Alhassan	PTS	6	May 1, 1997	Convention Hall, Asbury Park, New Jersey, U.S.	
7	Win	7–0	Ron McCarthy	PTS	6	Mar 14, 1997	Pepsi Arena, Albany, New York, U.S.	
6	Win	6–0	Russell Perry	KO	1 (4)	Jan 31, 1997	Raceway, Yonkers, New York, U.S.	
5	Win	5–0	Frank Grazier	KO	1 (4)	Jan 21, 1997	Grand Casino, Biloxi, Mississippi, U.S.	
4	Win	4–0	Mitchell Rose	PTS	4	Nov 8, 1996	Raceway, Yonkers, New York, U.S.	
3	Win	3–0	Andre Horne	TKO	1 (4)	Oct 5, 1996	Convention Hall, Atlantic City, New Jersey, U.S.	
2	Win	2–0	Scott Marcantonio	TKO	1 (4)	Sep 18, 1996	Westbury Music Fair, North Hempstead, New York, U.S.	
1	Win	1–0	Jamal Edwards	TKO	1 (4)	Aug 16, 1996	Raceway, Yonkers, New York, U.S.	

Sporting positions
Regional boxing titles
Vacant Title last held by Larry Donald	WBC Continental Americas heavyweight champion April 3, 1999 – August 28, 1999	Succeeded by Lance Whitaker
Preceded by David Tua	WBO Asia Pacific heavyweight champion August 13, 2011 – July 5, 2012	Succeeded by Shane Cameron
Preceded by David Tua	WBO Oriental heavyweight champion August 13, 2011 – July 5, 2012	Succeeded by Shane Cameron
