= Southeastern Livestock Pavilion =

Sports arena in Ocala, Florida, United States

Coordinates: 29°12′38″N 82°7′54″W

The Southeastern Livestock Pavilion is a 4,212-seat covered arena located in Ocala, Florida. It was one of the first new arenas to be completed after World War II, having been built in 1945, and, until the O'Connell Center was completed, served as the largest sports and entertainment venue north of Orlando, Florida. It is still used for rodeos, concerts, trade shows, and other special events.

The Pavilion still boasts Florida's largest clear-span roof, which rises no higher than 37 feet, and has two separate grandstands, the Eastside and Westside Grandstands, as well as a 36,000-square-foot arena floor. Adjacent are an 800-seat air-conditioned auditorium used for auctions and a3,178-square-foot reception hall. There is parking for 1000 cars.
