= Dominick Guinn =

American boxer

Personal information
- Nickname: The Southern Disaster
- Born: Dominick Alexander Guinn; April 20, 1975 (age 51) Hot Springs, Arkansas, United States
- Height: 1.91 m (6 ft 3 in)
- Weight: Heavyweight

Boxing career
- Reach: 198 cm (78 in)
- Stance: Orthodox

Boxing record
- Total fights: 52
- Wins: 38
- Win by KO: 26
- Losses: 13
- Draws: 1
Medal record
Men's amateur boxing
Representing United States
Goodwill Games
Bronze medal – third place	1998 New York	Super Heavyweight

Dominick Alexander Guinn (born April 20, 1975) is an American former professional boxer. He was self-managed and he was trained by Ronnie Shields and Alexander Gutierrez. He stands at 6'3" tall.

Known as the "Southern Disaster", he currently resides in Houston, Texas.

== Amateur career ==
Born in Hot Springs, Arkansas, Guinn began boxing at age nine and lost in the quarterfinals in the Michigan Junior Olympic Tournament at 139 pounds. Fighting in the 147-pound class at 15 years of age, Guinn lost in the finals. Guinn won the 19-and-under Junior World title in 1993.

Guinn had an amateur career record of 290-26, twice winning the National Golden Gloves Super Heavyweight Championship in 1997 and 1999 but losing in the Olympic qualification to Calvin Brock. In 1998, Guinn won the U.S. National Championships and won a Bronze Medal at the Goodwill Games in New York City.

== Professional career ==
He began his career winning his first 24 fights, including a seventh-round knockout win over Michael Grant and a victory over Duncan Dokiwari.

In 2004 he lost his first fight, a lackluster, but controversial decision to Monte Barrett. He knocked out veteran Phil Jackson but then lost his second fight to Sergei Liakhovich, who went on to win the WBO heavyweight title.

In 2005 he drew with Friday Ahunanya and lost to James Toney. In 2006, he defeated once-beaten British southpaw and Olympic Gold medalist Audley Harrison at the Agua Caliente casino, but lost his next fight against another southpaw Tony Thompson. In 2007 he continued his slide with losses against unbeaten Eddie Chambers in May and Robert Hawkins in December.

In October 2008, Guinn knocked out heavyweight prospect Jean François Bergeron in the second round. In 2009, Guinn knocked out unbeaten Johnnie White (21-0) in a first-round knockout to move back into contendership status and recently defeated Charles Davis by decision.

He has never been beaten inside the distance in his professional career.

== Professional boxing record ==
48 fights	35 wins	12 losses
By knockout	24	0
By decision	11	12
Draws	1	

Result	Record	Opponent	Type	Round	Date	Location	Notes
Loss	35-12-1	(Poland) Artur Szpilka	UD	10	25/05/2018	Stadion Narodowy, Warsaw, Poland	
Loss	35-11-1	(United Kingdom) Hughie Fury	PTS	10	26/03/2016	(United Kingdom) Wembley Arena, London, England	
Win	35-10-1	(United States) Donnie Davis	KO	1 (4)	28/02/2015	(United States) Complex Arena, Salt Lake City, USA	
Loss	34-10-1	(Poland) Tomasz Adamek	UD	10	03/08/2013	(United States) Mohegan Sun Casino, Uncasville, Connecticut, USA	Guinn cut over rt. eye from accidental head butt.
Win	34-9-1	(United States) Stacy Frazier	KO	1 (8)	08/06/2012	(United States) Events Center, Pharr, Texas, USA	
Loss	33-9-1	(Russia) Denis Boytsov	UD	10	13/04/2012	Cologne, Germany	
Loss	33-8-1	(United States) Amir Mansour	UD	10	19/08/2011	(United States) Dover Downs Hotel & Casino, Dover, Delaware, USA	For vacant IBF North American heavyweight title and interim WBO
Loss	33-7-1	(Bulgaria) Kubrat Pulev	UD	8	30/10/2010	Stadthalle, Rostock, Germany	
Win	33-6-1	(United States) Terrell Nelson	RTD	7 (8)	17/04/2010	(United States) Boardwalk Hall, Atlantic City, New Jersey, USA	
Win	32-6-1	(United States) Charles Davis	UD	6	12/12/2009	(United States) UIC Pavilion, Chicago, USA	
Win	31-6-1	(United States) Johnnie White	TKO	1 (10)	25/04/2009	(United States) Foxwoods Resort, Mashantucket, Connecticut, USA	
Win	30-6-1	(United States) Gabe Brown	UD	8	08/11/2008	(United States) Madison Square Garden, New York, USA	
Win	29-6-1	(Canada) Jean François Bergeron	KO	2 (10)	24/10/2008	Bell Centre, Montreal, Canada	
Loss	28-6-1	(United States) Robert Hawkins	UD	10	28/12/2007	River Rock Casino, Richmond, British Columbia, Canada	
Loss	28-5-1	(United States) Eddie Chambers	UD	10	04/05/2007	(United States) Palms Casino Resort, Las Vegas, USA	
Win	28-4-1	(United States) Zuri Lawrence	TKO	2 (10)	02/02/2007	(United States) Main Street Armory, Rochester, New York, USA	
Win	27-4-1	(United States) Zack Page	SD	8	09/12/2006	(United States) Alltel Arena, North Little Rock, Arkansas, USA	
Loss	26-4-1	(United States) Tony Thompson	UD	12	28/06/2006	(United States) HP Pavilion, San Jose, California, USA	For vacant WBC Continental Americas heavyweight title
Win	26-3-1	(United Kingdom) Audley Harrison	UD	10	14/04/2006	(United States) Agua Caliente Casino, Rancho Mirage, California, USA	
Loss	25-3-1	(United States) James Toney	UD	12	01/10/2005	(United States) Events Center, Reno, Nevada, USA	For IBA heavyweight title
Draw	25-2-1	(Nigeria) Friday Ahunanya	PTS	10	22/04/2005	(United States) Caesars Palace, Las Vegas, USA	
Loss	25–2	(Belarus) Siarhei Liakhovich	UD	10	03/12/2004	(United States) Bally's Park Place Hotel Casino, Atlantic City, New Jersey, USA	
Win	25–1	(United States) Phil Jackson	KO	1 (10)	24/07/2004	(United States) Boardwalk Hall, Atlantic City, New Jersey, USA	
Loss	24–1	(United States) Monte Barrett	SD	10	27/03/2004	(United States) Alltel Arena, Little Rock, Arkansas, USA	
Win	24–0	(United States) Derrick Banks	UD	10	22/11/2003	(United States) Reliant Park, Houston, USA	
Win	23–0	(Nigeria) Duncan Dokiwari	UD	10	27/09/2003	(United States) HSBC Arena, Buffalo, New York, USA	
Win	22–0	(United States) Michael Grant	TKO	7 (10)	07/06/2003	(United States) Boardwalk Hall, Atlantic City, New Jersey, USA	
Win	21–0	(United States) Charles Hatcher	TKO	9 (10)	12/04/2003	(United States) Caesars Tahoe, Stateline, Nevada, USA	
Win	20–0	(United States) Otis Tisdale	UD	8	01/02/2003	(United States) Mohegan Sun Casino, Uncasville, Connecticut, USA	
Win	19–0	(United States) Garing Lane	SD	8	19/10/2002	(United States) Reliant Park, Houston, USA	
Win	18–0	(United States) Terry McGroom	TKO	7 (8)	08/09/2002	(United States) Great Plains Coliseum, Lawton, Oklahoma, USA	
Win	17–0	(United States) Wade Lewis	KO	1 (8)	22/06/2002	(United States) Beau Rivage Resort & Casino, Biloxi, Mississippi, USA	
Win	16–0	(United States) Drexie James	TKO	1 (8)	18/05/2002	(United States) Mohegan Sun Casino, Uncasville, Connecticut, USA	
Win	15–0	(United States) Derek Berry	TKO	2 (8)	30/03/2002	(United States) Lucky Star Casino, Oklahoma, USA	
Win	14–0	(United States) Tony LaRosa	TKO	1 (6)	22/02/2002	(United States) Schottenstein Center, Columbus, Ohio, USA	
Win	13–0	(United States) Antonio Colbert	UD	6	01/12/2001	(United States) Mountaineer Casino Racetrack and Resort, Chester, West Virginia, USA	
Win	12–0	(United States) Todd Diggs	KO	1 (6)	09/11/2001	(United States) Sunset Station, San Antonio, USA	
Win	11–0	(United States) Maurice Wheeler	KO	2 (?)	27/07/2001	(United States) Soaring Eagle Casino, Mount Pleasant, Michigan, USA	
Win	10–0	(United States) Marvin Hill	KO	1 (6)	06/07/2001	(United States) Hilton Hotel, Reno, Nevada, USA	
Win	9–0	(United States) Ronnie Smith	UD	6	05/05/2001	(United States) Don Haskins Convention Center, El Paso, Texas, USA	
Win	8–0	(United States) Marvin Hunt	TKO	4 (4)	22/02/2001	(United States) Harrisburg, Pennsylvania, USA	ThunderBox Fight
Win	7–0	(United States) Anthony Moore	UD	4	08/12/2001	(United States) Hard Rock Hotel and Casino, Las Vegas, USA	
Win	6–0	(United States) James Lester	TKO	1 (4)	11/11/2000	(United States) Mandalay Bay Resort & Casino, Las Vegas, USA	
Win	5–0	(United States) Rodney Phillips	TKO	1 (6)	20/10/2000	(United States) The Palace, Auburn Hills, Michigan, USA	
Win	4–0	(United States) John Lewis	TKO	1 (4)	26/08/2000	(United States) Mandalay Bay Resort & Casino, Las Vegas, USA	
Win	3–0	(United States) Michael Rothberger	TKO	1 (4)	11/08/2000	(United States) Tropicana Hotel & Casino, Atlantic City, New Jersey, USA	
Win	2–0	(United States) Leonard Childs	TKO	2 (4)	27/07/2000	(United States) Hammerstein Ballroom, New York, USA	
Win	1–0	(United States) Leroy Hollis	TKO	1 (4)	16/06/2000	(United States) Mandalay Bay Resort & Casino, Las Vegas, USA	

Preceded by Willie Palms	United States Amateur Super Heavyweight Champion; 1998	Succeeded by Calvin Brock
