= Henry Namauu =

American boxer

Henry Namauu (born September 4, 1984) is an American Professional Boxer. He is currently ranked 7th in the United States out of 207 and is 40th in the world out of 945.

His professional record is 8 wins (5 KO) and 3 losses (2 by KO). He has won his last 5 in a row at the time of this writing. His last bout was a split decision with Jason Douglas on October 22, 2010.
