= Eliseo Castillo =

Cuban boxer

Personal information
- Born: April 29, 1975 (age 51) Havana, Cuba
- Weight: Cruiserweight Heavyweight

Boxing career
- Stance: Orthodox

Boxing record
- Total fights: 24
- Wins: 20
- Win by KO: 15
- Losses: 3
- Draws: 1
- No contests: 0

Eliseo Castillo (born April 29, 1975) is a Cuban former professional boxer who competed from 1996 to 2009, holding the NABO cruiserweight title in 2006. He is the younger brother of Heavyweight boxer Elieser Castillo.

== Amateur career ==
From the ages of 12 through 16, he trained to box through the Cuban state government's amateur boxing program. (This is the same program that produced such boxing legends as Teofilo Stevenson, Félix Savón, Joel Casamayor, and Juan Carlos Gomez.) Despite winning the vast majority of his approximately 90 amateur bouts in Cuba, the young fighter could not manage to capture an international title.

== Defection from Cuba ==
At the age of 17, Eliseo Castillo escaped from Cuba on a raft with his brothers Elieser (a very well known fellow Heavyweight boxer) and Eliades and two other friends. The group spent five days at sea before they drifted ashore in Panama. Soon thereafter, they were returned to Guantanamo Bay. After 18 months of processing the group was allowed to emigrate to the United States. He then moved to Miami, Florida.

== Professional career ==
At the age of 20, he began his professional career as a boxer. His first bout was against Anthony Mack (who was also making his professional debut that evening) on February 24, 1996. Castillo won the bout via first-round knockout. He fought off-and-on into the new millennium, at one time even taking 3 years off from the sport.

Though his career had been spotty, he still managed to remain undefeated up until April 2005. The only blemish on his record up until that point was a draw to Terry Pitts (who later changed his name to Sajad Abdul Aziz) on November 13, 1998, at the famed Mahi Shrine Temple Auditorium in Miami. Aziz was able to score knockdowns in both the 4th and 5th rounds, but Castillo fought back and secured a majority draw. These fights were at cruiserweight.

His biggest victory came on July 3, 2004, against former Heavyweight champion Michael Moorer at the American Airlines Arena in Miami. He beat the former champion by a unanimous decision in their 10-round bout. This brought him some level of attention from the boxing press and garnered for him a fight with Wladimir Klitschko the following year.

At 2:51 in the fourth round, Klitschko was declared the victor after referee Daniel Van de Wiele stopped the fight.

Shortly after the fight with Klitschko, Castillo moved back down to the Cruiserweight division. He won two straight since the Klitschko loss and was KOd by, the then undefeated, Johnathon Banks on July 26, 2006.

== Professional boxing record ==
20 Wins (15 knockouts, 5 decisions), 3 Losses (3 knockouts, 0 decisions), 1 Draw
Result	Record	Opponent	Type	Round	Date	Location	Notes
Loss	16-0	(Russia) Denis Lebedev	TKO	5	22/03/2009	Balashikha, Russia	Referee stopped the bout at 2:50 of the fifth round.
Loss	11-0	(United States) Johnathon Banks	KO	4	26/07/2006	(New York (state)) New York City, U.S.	WBO NABO Cruiserweight Title. Castillo knocked out at 1:12 of the fourth round.
Win	11-4-3	(United States) Willie Herring	UD	12	24/03/2006	Miami, Florida, U.S.	WBO NABO/WBC Latino Cruiserweight Titles.
Win	9-2	(United States) Chris Lewallen	TKO	1	25/02/2006	Oklahoma City, Oklahoma, U.S.	Referee stopped the bout at 1:16 of the first round.
Loss	43-3	(Ukraine) Wladimir Klitschko	TKO	4	23/04/2005	Dortmund, Germany	Referee stopped the bout at 2:51 of the fourth round.
Win	46-3-1	(United States) Michael Moorer	UD	10	03/07/2004	Miami, Florida, U.S.	
Win	8-5	(United States) Drexie James	KO	1	01/05/2004	Miami, Florida, U.S.	James knocked out at 3:10 of the first round.
Win	10-8	(United States) Curtis Taylor	KO	3	26/03/2004	Miami, Florida, U.S.	Taylor knocked out at 0:49 of the third round.
Win	15-20	(Ivory Coast) Onebo Maxime	UD	4	16/01/2004	Minneapolis, Minnesota, U.S.	
Win	6-27	(United States) Ronnie Smith	UD	4	13/10/2002	Choctaw, Mississippi, U.S.	
Win	16-9-3	(United States) Bill Medei	TKO	1	22/06/2002	United States Virgin Islands	
Win	6-2-3	(Mexico) Agustin Corpus	TKO	5	07/08/1999	Miami, Florida, U.S.	
Draw	11-6-3	(United States) Sajad Abdul Aziz	PTS	10	13/11/1998	Miami, Florida, U.S.	
Win	8-5-2	(United States) Tyrone Armstead	TKO	5	07/06/1998	Miami, Florida, U.S.	Referee stopped the bout at 2:54 of the fifth round.
Win	3-5	(United States) Ed Mosley	TKO	4	02/05/1998	Miami, Florida, U.S.	Referee stopped the bout at 2:30 of the fourth round.
Win	5-4	(United States) Jerry Brown	TKO	2	20/12/1997	Miami, Florida, U.S.	
Win	0-3	(United States) Oscar Silva	KO	1	22/08/1997	Miami Beach, Florida, U.S.	
Win	5-7	(United States) Berry Butler	UD	4	24/01/1997	Atlantic City, New Jersey, U.S.	
Win	1-21	(Puerto Rico) Jesus Carlos Velez	TKO	3	03/01/1997	Hialeah, Florida, U.S.	
Win	0-1	(United States) George Holder	TKO	2	27/09/1996	Atlantic City, New Jersey, U.S.	
Win	--	(United States) Alphonzo Davis	TKO	3	10/08/1996	Las Vegas, Nevada, U.S.	
Win	3-0	(Brazil) Aurelio Dos Santos	KO	1	29/07/1996	Hallandale, Florida, U.S.	
Win	3-11-1	(Puerto Rico) Luis Yampier	TKO	1	25/05/1996	Miami Beach, Florida, U.S.	
Win	--	(United States) Anthony Mack	TKO	1	24/02/1996	Miami Beach, Florida, U.S.	
