= Aaron Williams (boxer) =

American boxer (born 1986)

Aaron Williams (born April 9, 1986, in Cleveland) is an American professional boxer. His professional record is 22–3–1 (15 KOs).

== Amateur ==
He began boxing around the age of eight at a local neighborhood recreation center called Fairfax. As a young man he lived and trained for 3 years under the tutelage of Emanuel Steward, boxing trainer, commentator and inductee of the International Boxing Hall Of Fame and the World Boxing Hall of Fame. As an amateur boxer he racked up nine national championships. Williams had an amateur record of 90–8.

- 2004 Olympic Trials Bronze Medalist
- 2003 Under 19 National Champion
- 2003 Silver Gloves National Champion
- 2001 International Jr. Olympics Champion
- 2-time Nat'l P.A.L. Champion
- 2-time Nat'l Junior Olympic Champion
- 4-time Nat'l Silver Gloves Champion
- Member Kronk Amateur Boxing Team

== Pro ==
Aaron moved to Las Vegas to pursue his professional boxing career. He made his pro debut at 19, on February 11, 2005, in Oklahoma City, stopping Mike Cooper (1–0) in the opening round. His best wins so far are over well-known clubfighters Zach Page (record 11–7) and Charles Davis (17–11–1). Aaron has made a name for himself of registering dynamic knockouts of his opponents. He has also fought on ESPN and won by a second round knockout against Deleon Tisley, earning him the network's Play of the Day. Williams fought veteran puncher Andre Purlette at the Twin River Event Center in Lincoln, Rhode Island. Williams dropped Purlette with two consecutive right hands in round two. Purlette recovered at the count of eight, only for Williams to unleash a barrage of punches that eventually caused the referee to stop the bout in the same round. After winning 13 consecutive fights, Williams was stopped in the fifth round against Jose Luis Herrera. Williams won two bouts before being outpointed by Yoan Pablo Hernández. In 2022, after 11 years away from the ring, Williams surprised the boxing world by announcing a comeback at the age of 36. He made a return to the boxing ring in Tijuana, Mexico on October 22, 2022 against Abraham Ernesto Beltran. Williams lost via technical knockout.
