= Silver Gloves =

Annual youth amateur boxing tournament in the United States

Silver Gloves of America is an amateur boxing organization that runs an annual national competition in the United States for boxers aged 8 to 16. The tournament, commonly called the Silver Gloves, is open to boxers who have not competed professionally, and has been sponsored by Ringside, Inc. since 1992.

The National Silver Gloves Association was started in Illinois in 1967 by Frank Hess and Frank Granados, and has held a national tournament every year since. In its early years the national tournament rotated between host cities on a two-year cycle, including Kingsport, Tennessee (1987–88), Prescott, Arizona (1989) and Marshalltown, Iowa (1990–91). Following the Ringside partnership in 1992, the national tournament has been held in the Kansas City metropolitan area. The 59th annual National Silver Gloves Championships took place in February 2026 in Independence, Missouri.

Competition is structured across eight regions covering all 50 states and the District of Columbia, with boxers advancing from state and regional tournaments to the national championships. The association also administers a scholarship program for former competitors who have graduated high school or earned a GED, with awards paid directly to the recipient's college or trade school.

The Silver Gloves is distinct from the Golden Gloves, a separate amateur boxing tournament whose flagship national competition is open to boxers aged 18 and over.

== See also ==
- NCAA Boxing Championship
- Golden Gloves
