= Roy Jones Jr. vs. Otis Grant =

Boxing match

Roy Jones Jr. vs Otis Grant
- Date: November 14, 1998
- Venue: Foxwoods Resort Casino, Ledyard, Connecticut, U.S.
- Title(s) on the line: WBA and WBC light heavyweight titles

Tale of the tape
Boxer	Roy Jones Jr.	Otis Grant
Nickname	Junior	Magic
Hometown	Pensacola, Florida, U.S.	Montreal, Quebec, Canada
Purse	$2,000,000	$500,000
Pre-fight record	37–1 (31 KO)	31–1–1 (17 KO)
Age	29 years, 9 months	30 years, 10 months
Height	5 ft 11 in (180 cm)	5 ft 9 1/2 in (177 cm)
Weight	171 lb (78 kg)	172 lb (78 kg)
Style	Orthodox	Southpaw
Recognition	WBA and WBC; Light Heavyweight champion 3-division world champion	WBO; Middleweight Champion

Result
- Jones wins via 10th-round technical knockout

Roy Jones Jr. vs. Otis Grant was a professional boxing match contested on November 14, 1998, for the WBA and WBC light heavyweight titles.

== Background ==
Three months after winning the WBA light heavyweight title after defeating Lou Del Valle in his previous fight in July 1998, Roy Jones Jr. announced in early October that he would make the first defense of the newly unified titles (having been promoted to full WBC champion after the controversial demotion of former champion Graciano Rocchigiani) the following month against the reigning WBO middleweight champion Otis Grant. Jones, who had not been scheduled to fight until December, agreed to fight one month ahead of time at the request of HBO, who were left without a main event for their November telecast of HBO World Championship Boxing when a rematch between Arturo Gatti and Ivan Robinson fell through.

Despite fighting two divisions below him, Grant, who was a special education teacher at the time of the fight and had to take a leave from the school that he was teaching at in order to take the fight, was handpicked by Jones with Jones claiming he had done so because he "liked Grant's character" and wanted a "challenge." In order to make up for the 15-pound weight disparity between their respective divisions, Jones and Grant initially agreed to fight at the 168-pound super middleweight limit. Come fight time, the contract called for the slightly increased catchweight of 170 pounds "give or take a pound." Jones entered the fight at 171 pounds while Grant weight one pound heavier at 172 pounds.

After having raised money for the severely injured and disabled former boxer Gerald McClellan two years prior with his fight against Bryant Brannon, Jones continued his charitable efforts in regards to McClellan, first hosting a fund-raiser in nearby New York City to raise money for McClellan and his family four days before the fight whilst also donating a portion of his fight purse to the fund himself.

== The fights ==
=== Undercard ===
The untelevised bouts included wins for Derrick Gainer and David Izon.

=== Mosley vs. Leija ===
Shane Mosley vs. Jesse James Leija
- Title on the line: IBF lightweight title

Tale of the tape
Boxer	Shane Mosley	Jesse James Leija
Nickname	"Sugar"	"The Texas Tornado"
Hometown	Lynwood, California, U.S.	San Antonio, Texas, U.S.
Pre-fight record	29–0 (27 KO)	37–3–2 (15 KO)
Age	27 years, 2 months	32 years, 4 months
Height	5 ft 9 in (175 cm)	5 ft 5 in (165 cm)
Weight	135 lb (61 kg)	135 lb (61 kg)
Style	Orthodox	Orthodox
Recognition	IBF; Lightweight Champion	Former super featherweight champion

Result
- Mosley defeats Leija by 9th round RTD

The first of the two televised bouts saw IBF Lightweight champion Shane Mosley make the sixth defense of his title against former WBC super featherweight champion Jesse James Leija. Leija would take the fight on 3 weeks notice.

==== The fight ====
As the fight progressed, Leija was knocked down in rounds 6, 7 and 9. The fight was stopped when Leija's corner pulled him out after the 9th round.

Mosley was leading by scores of 89–78, 89–78 and 88–79 at the time of the stoppage.

According to CompuBox, Mosley outlanded Leija with the champion connecting with 249 of 550 punches thrown (a 45.3% connect rate) against Leija landing 109 of 469 (a 23.2% connect rate).

==== Aftermath ====
Speaking after the bout Mosley said "In the fifth round I noticed that my left hand was hurting, so I quit throwing the jab so much and started working the body. In the sixth round my right hand started to hurt. But I kept working the body. I think that's what did it for me."

Preceded by vs. Eduardo Morales	Shane Mosley's bouts 14 November 1998	Succeeded by vs. Golden Johnson
Preceded by vs. Azumah Nelson	Jesse James Leija's bouts 14 November 1998	Succeeded by vs. Verdell Smith

=== Main Event ===
Jones dominated Grant through 10 rounds. Though neither fighter threw many punches, Jones decidedly had advantage, landing 173 of 392 thrown, which was over 100 more than grant who landed just 66 punches of 248, including just a single jab out of 137 thrown jabs for a paltry 1% success rate. Jones scored two knockdowns during the fight, first send Grant flat on his back, with his heels going up over his head, with a right uppercut. Grant answered referee Arthur Mercante Sr.'s 10-count at eight and survived the round despite a Jones flurry. Following the sixth round, Jones fought extremely tentatively, seemingly taking it easy on Grant, causing Mercante to call a brief stoppage during the seventh round to admonish Jones and Grant for their lack of activity amid heavy boos from the crowd. Finally in the 10th round, Jones sent Grant down on the seat of his pants with a straight right hand for his second knockdown. Though Grant once again got back to his feet at the count of eight and Mercante was seemingly going to allow him to continue, his manager and trainer Russ Anber threw a white towel into the ring to signify surrender and then entered the ring soon after, causing the fight to be stopped. Jones was named the winner by technical knockout at 1:18 of the round. At the time of the stoppage Jones led on all three scorecards 90–80, 90–81 and 89–80. HBO's unofficial ringside scorer Harold Lederman scored the fight 89–81 for Jones.

== Fight card ==
Confirmed bouts:

Weight Class	Weight		vs.		Method	Round	Notes
Light Heavyweight	175 lbs.	Roy Jones Jr. (c)	def.	Otis Grant	TKO	10/12	^{note 1}
Lightweight	135 lbs.	Shane Mosley (c)	def.	Jesse James Leija	RTD	9/12	^{note 2}
Heavyweight	190+ lbs.	David Izon	def.	Darrol Wilson	KO	4/10
Lightweight	135 lbs.	Derrick Gainer	def.	Louie Leija	TKO	6/10
Welterweight	147 lbs.	Lemuel Nelson	def.	Sam Girard	PTS	6/6
Light Heavyweight	175 lbs.	Billy Lewis	def.	Tim Hillie	PTS	4/4

^Note 1 For WBA and WBC Light Heavvyweight titles
^Note 2 For IBF Lightweight title

== Broadcasting ==
Country	Broadcaster
Canada	TSN
United States	HBO

Preceded by vs. Lou Del Valle	Roy Jones Jr.'s bouts 14 November 1998	Succeeded by vs. Richard Frazier
Preceded by vs. Ernesto Rafael Sena	Otis Grant's bouts 14 November 1998	Succeeded by vs. Dingaan Thobela
