= Lennox Lewis vs. David Tua =

Boxing competition

Royal Rampage
- Date: November 11, 2000
- Venue: Mandalay Bay, Paradise, Nevada, US
- Title(s) on the line: WBC, IBF, and IBO heavyweight titles

Tale of the tape
Boxer	Lennox Lewis	David Tua
Nickname	The Lion	Tuaman
Hometown	London, England	South Auckland, New Zealand
Purse	$8,500,000	$3,500,000
Pre-fight record	37–1–1 (29 KO)	37–1 (32 KO)
Age	35 years, 2 months	27 years, 11 months
Height	6 ft 5 in (196 cm)	5 ft 10 in (178 cm)
Weight	249 lb (113 kg)	245 lb (111 kg)
Style	Orthodox	Orthodox
Recognition	WBC, IBF, and IBO; Heavyweight Champion	WBC/IBF; No. 1 Ranked Heavyweight

Result
- Lewis wins via 12-round unanimous decision (117-111, 119-109, 118-110)

Lennox Lewis vs. David Tua, billed as Royal Rampage, was a professional boxing match contested on November 11, 2000 for the WBC, IBF, and IBO heavyweight championships.

== Background ==
After becoming the Undisputed Heavyweight Champion in 1999, Lennox Lewis successfully defended his crown twice in easy second round knockout victories over Michael Grant and Francois Botha. Following his victory over Botha, Lewis quickly set his sights on mandatory challenger David Tua, who was ranked number one by both the WBC and IBF. Though Lewis had hoped to have the bout in his boyhood home of Toronto, Canada, it was ultimately switched to the Mandalay Bay Resort & Casino in Paradise, Nevada. Tua came into the fight sporting an impressive 37–1 record, with victories over future Heavyweight champions John Ruiz, Oleg Maskaev and Hasim Rahman and his only loss coming against undefeated prospect Ike Ibeabuchi by unanimous decision. Though he came into the fight as a 3–1 underdog, Tua was confident he could defeat Lewis, calling him a "lazy fighter" while also stating "He tends to get tired after two or three rounds. "He gets vulnerable. His chin is very suspect. The only way to win is to knock Lennox Lewis out"

== The fight ==
Unlike Lewis' previous two fights which did not make it past the second round, this fight went the full 12 rounds. Though Lewis landed a right hook early in the first round, cracking one of Tua's ribs, Lewis was unable to gain a knockdown over Tua. Nevertheless, Lewis was able to control almost the entire fight, outpunching Tua 674 to 413, while outlanding him 300 to 110 en route to a lopsided unanimous decision. All three judges ruled in favor of Lewis with scores of 119–109, 118–110 and 117–111. HBO's Harold Lederman had the bout scored 117-111 for Lewis, the AP had it 119-109, while the BBC's John Rawling had it 120-108.

== Aftermath ==
After the bout Lewis called out former champ Mike Tyson, saying "If Tyson wants to come to test; I'll put him to rest; Lennox Lewis is the best." His manager Frank Maloney said Lewis "will go away now and have a rest, and leave the teams to try and negotiate the next fight - with Tyson". He told BBC Radio 5 Live, "He deserves it. He was robbed of a fight against Riddick Bowe; he was robbed of a fight with Michael Moorer, when Moorer was in his prime."

The bout would prove to be the only major championship fight of Tua's career. Following his loss to Lewis, Tua took part in a four-man, three fight tournament to determine the IBF's number one contender. Tua defeated Danell Nicholson to advance to the final where he would meet Chris Byrd, who ultimately defeated Tua by unanimous decision to earn a match for the IBF Heavyweight title. Lewis, meanwhile, followed his victory over Tua with a match against little-known Hasim Rahman (who had been stopped by Tua in 1998). Despite being a 20–1 underdog, Rahman stunned the boxing world by knocking out Lewis in the fifth round to become the new heavyweight champion.

== Undercard ==
Confirmed bouts:

== Broadcasting ==
Country	Broadcaster
Australia	Main Event
Mexico	Televisa
Philippines	IBC
United Kingdom	Sky Sports
United States	HBO

Preceded by vs. Francois Botha	Lennox Lewis' bouts 11 November 2000	Succeeded by vs. Hasim Rahman
Preceded by vs. Robert Daniels	David Tua's bouts 11 November 2000	Succeeded by vs. Danell Nicholson
