= Derrick Gainer =

American boxer (born 1972)

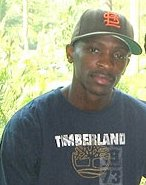

Personal information
- Nickname: Smoke
- Nationality: American
- Born: Derrick Emory Gainer; August 22, 1972 (age 53) Pensacola, Florida, U.S.
- Height: 5 ft 9 in (175 cm)
- Weight: Lightweight; Super Featherweight; Featherweight

Boxing career
- Reach: 72 in (183 cm)
- Stance: Southpaw

Boxing record
- Total fights: 51
- Wins: 43
- Win by KO: 25
- Losses: 7
- Draws: 1

Derrick "Smoke" Gainer (born August 22, 1972) is an American former professional boxer who competed from 1990 to 2012. He held the WBA featherweight title from 2000 to 2003.

== Professional career ==
Gainer is a colleague and friend of fellow Pensacola, Florida native Roy Jones Jr., and often fought on his under-cards.

=== Featherweight champion ===
In 2000, Gainer defeated Freddie Norwood to win the WBA featherweight title and after four defenses lost to Juan Manuel Márquez, who became super champion, via technical decision in 2003.

=== Post title ===
Since his defeat to Marquez, Gainer lost in a challenge to WBA titleholder Chris John via unanimous decision.

His last was a split decision win over Carlos Navarro on the undercard of the Roy Jones-Anthony Hanshaw bout at the Mississippi Coast Coliseum, in Biloxi, Mississippi.

== Professional boxing record ==
| 51 fights | 43 wins | 7 losses |
|---|---|---|
| By knockout | 25 | 2 |
| By decision | 18 | 5 |
| Draws | 1 | |

Key to abbreviations used for results
| DQ | Disqualification | RTD | Corner retirement |
| KO | Knockout | SD | Split decision / split draw |
| MD | Majority decision / majority draw | TD | Technical decision / technical draw |
| NC | No contest | TKO | Technical knockout |
| PTS | Points decision | UD | Unanimous decision / unanimous draw |

Boxing record
| No. | Result | Record | Opponent | Type | Round(s) | Time | Date | Location | Notes |
|---|---|---|---|---|---|---|---|---|---|
| 51 | Win | 43–7–1 | (Dominican Republic) Antonio Santos | TKO | 5 (10) | ? | 29 Sep 2012 | (United States) Maritime Park, Pensacola, Florida, U.S. | |
| 50 | Win | 42–7–1 | (United States) Angel Hernandez | SD | 6 | N/a | 28 Aug 2010 | (United States) Rivers Casino, Pittsburgh, Pennsylvania, U.S. | |
| 49 | Win | 41–7–1 | (United States) Carlos Navarro | SD | 10 | N/a | 14 Jul 2007 | (United States) Mississippi Coast Coliseum, Biloxi, Mississippi, U.S. | |
| 48 | Win | 40–7–1 | (United States) Phillip Payne | SD | 12 | N/a | 12 Aug 2006 | (United States) Paragon Casino, Marksville, Louisiana, U.S. | For vacant IBA Americas lightweight title |
| 47 | Loss | 39–7–1 | (Indonesia) Chris John | UD | 12 | N/a | 22 Apr 2005 | The BritAma Arena, Kelapa Gading, Jakarta, Indonesia | For WBA (Regular) featherweight title |
| 46 | Loss | 39–6–1 | (Mexico) Juan Manuel Márquez | TD | 7 (12) | 2:37 | 1 Nov 2003 | (United States) Van Andel Arena, Grand Rapids, Michigan, U.S. | Lost WBA featherweight title For IBF featherweight title Unanimous TD: Gainer cut from an accidental head clash |
| 45 | Win | 39–5–1 | (Colombia) Oscar León | SD | 12 | N/a | 12 Apr 2003 | (United States) MGM Grand Garden Arena, Paradise, Nevada, U.S. | Retained WBA featherweight title |
| 44 | Draw | 38–5–1 | (Puerto Rico) Daniel Seda | TD | 2 (12) | 2:13 | 24 Aug 2002 | Roberto Clemente Stadium, Carolina, Puerto Rico | Retained WBA featherweight title Technical draw due to a Gainer cut caused by a head-butt. |
| 43 | Win | 38–5 | (United States) Cedric Mingo | TKO | 2 (10) | ? | 17 May 2001 | (United States) Grand Casino Biloxi, Biloxi, Mississippi, U.S. | |
| 42 | Win | 37–5 | (Colombia) Victor Polo | UD | 12 | N/a | 24 Feb 2001 | (United States) Ice Palace, Tampa, Florida, U.S. | Retained WBA featherweight title |
| 41 | Win | 36–5 | (United States) Freddie Norwood | KO | 11 (12) | 1:56 | 9 Sep 2000 | (United States) New Orleans Arena, New Orleans, Louisiana, U.S. | Won WBA featherweight title |
| 40 | Win | 35–5 | (Venezuela) Richard Carrillo | KO | 8 (12) | 2:56 | 15 Jul 2000 | (United States) Grand Casino Biloxi, Biloxi, Mississippi, U.S. | |
| 39 | Win | 34–5 | (United States) Sean Fletcher | UD | 10 | N/a | 13 May 2000 | (United States) Conseco Fieldhouse, Indianapolis, Indiana, U.S. | |
| 38 | Loss | 33–5 | (United States) Diego Corrales | TKO | 3 (12) | 1:50 | 18 Mar 2000 | (United States) MGM Grand Garden Arena, Paradise, Nevada, U.S. | For IBF and vacant IBA super featherweight titles |
| 37 | Win | 33–4 | (Argentina) Sergio Rafael Liendo | UD | 10 | N/a | 19 Nov 1999 | (United States) Grand Casino Tunica, Tunica, Mississippi, U.S. | |
| 36 | Win | 32–4 | (United States) Sergio Reyes | TKO | 5 (10) | 0:56 | 15 Oct 1999 | (United States) Bayfront Auditorium, Pensacola, Florida, U.S. | |
| 35 | Win | 31–4 | (United States) Jay Cantu | TKO | 1 (10) | ? | 10 Sep 1999 | (United States) Grand Casino Biloxi, Biloxi, Mississippi, U.S. | |
| 34 | Win | 30–4 | (Mexico) Javier Lucas | KO | 2 (10) | ? | 20 Aug 1999 | (United States) Pechanga Resort & Casino, Temecula, California, U.S. | |
| 33 | Win | 29–4 | (Dominican Republic) Freddy Cruz | UD | 10 | N/a | 30 Jul 1999 | (United States) Grand Casino Biloxi, Biloxi, Mississippi, U.S. | |
| 32 | Win | 28–4 | (United States) Donovan Carey | TKO | 6 (12) | 2:51 | 5 Jun 1999 | (United States) Mississippi Coast Coliseum, Biloxi, Mississippi, U.S. | Won vacant NABA "interim" super featherweight title |
| 31 | Win | 27–4 | (United States) Harold Warren | UD | 12 | N/a | 9 Jan 1999 | (United States) Pensacola Civic Center, Pensacola, Florida, U.S. | Won vacant USBA super featherweight title |
| 30 | Win | 26–4 | (United States) Louie Leija | TKO | 6 (10) | ? | 14 Nov 1998 | (United States) Foxwoods Resort, Mashantucket, Connecticut, U.S. | |
| 29 | Win | 25–4 | (United States) Bernard Harris | UD | 10 | N/a | 18 Aug 1998 | (United States) Grand Casino Tunica, Tunica, Mississippi, U.S. | |
| 28 | Win | 24–4 | (United States) Kevin Kelley | UD | 10 | N/a | 18 Jul 1998 | (United States) The Theater at Madison Square Garden, New York City, New York, U.S. | |
| 27 | Win | 23–4 | (Panama) Orlando Soto | TKO | 5 (10) | 0:56 | 9 Jun 1998 | (United States) Grand Casino Biloxi, Biloxi, Mississippi, U.S. | |
| 26 | Win | 22–4 | (Dominican Republic) Wilson Santos | KO | 3 (10) | 1:02 | 25 Apr 1998 | (United States) Mississippi Coast Coliseum, Biloxi, Mississippi, U.S. | |
| 25 | Win | 21–4 | (Mexico) Manuel Medina | KO | 9 (12) | 1:20 | 7 Aug 1997 | (United States) Foxwoods Resort, Mashantucket, Connecticut, U.S. | Retained NABU super featherweight title |
| 24 | Win | 20–4 | (Trinidad and Tobago) Alric Johnson | TKO | 12 (12) | ? | 21 Mar 1997 | (United States) Mark G. Etess Arena, Atlantic City, New Jersey U.S. | Won vacant NABU super featherweight title |
| 23 | Win | 19–4 | (United States) Shane Gannon | TKO | 2 (10) | 1:32 | 22 Nov 1996 | (United States) Ice Palace, Tampa, Florida, U.S. | |
| 22 | Win | 18–4 | (United States) Patrick Simeon | TKO | 2 (12) | ? | 4 Oct 1996 | (United States) The Theater at Madison Square Garden, New York City, New York, U.S. | Won vacant WBC Continental Americas featherweight title |
| 21 | Loss | 17–4 | (United States) Kevin Kelley | KO | 8 (12) | 2:16 | 15 Jun 1996 | (United States) Jacksonville Coliseum, Jacksonville, Florida, U.S. | For WBU featherweight title |
| 20 | Win | 17–3 | (Mexico) Javier Diaz | TKO | 6 (10) | ? | 9 May 1996 | (United States) Interstate Fairgrounds, Pensacola, Florida, U.S. | |
| 19 | Win | 16–3 | (United States) James Crayton | TKO | 10 (10) | ? | 12 Jan 1996 | (United States) Madison Square Garden, New York City, New York, U.S. | |
| 18 | Win | 15–3 | (Mexico) Roberto Villareal | KO | 5 (12) | ? | 30 Sep 1995 | (United States) Pensacola Civic Center, Pensacola, Florida, U.S. | Retained NABF featherweight title |
| 17 | Win | 14–3 | (United States) Harold Warren | UD | 12 | N/a | 24 Jun 1995 | (United States) Boardwalk Hall, Atlantic City, New Jersey, U.S. | Won NABF featherweight title |
| 16 | Win | 13–3 | (United States) Feliciano Correa | TKO | 2 (8) | ? | 18 Mar 1995 | (United States) Pensacola Civic Center, Pensacola, Florida, U.S. | |
| 15 | Loss | 12–3 | (United States) Robert Garcia | UD | 10 | N/a | 18 Nov 1994 | (United States) MGM Grand Garden Arena, Paradise, Nevada, U.S. | |
| 14 | Loss | 12–2 | (Puerto Rico) Greg Torres | UD | 10 | N/a | 5 Oct 1994 | (United States) Merv Griffin's Resorts, Atlantic City, New Jersey, U.S. | |
| 13 | Win | 12–1 | (United States) Darren McGrew | UD | 6 | N/a | 20 Sep 1994 | (United States) Interstate Fairgrounds, Pensacola, Florida, U.S. | |
| 12 | Win | 11–1 | (Mexico) Marcelo Rodriguez | UD | 8 | N/a | 27 May 1994 | (United States) MGM Grand Garden Arena, Paradise, Nevada, U.S. | |
| 11 | Win | 10–1 | (United States) Roy Simpson | TKO | 1 (10) | 2:31 | 22 Mar 1994 | (United States) University of West Florida, Pensacola, Florida, U.S. | |
| 10 | Win | 9–1 | (United States) Julian Flores | UD | 12 | N/a | 30 Nov 1993 | (United States) Pensacola Civic Center, Pensacola, Florida, U.S. | Won vacant IBO featherweight title |
| 9 | Win | 8–1 | (United States) Runnell Doll | SD | 6 | N/a | 10 Jan 1993 | (United States) Harrah's Atlantic City, Atlantic City, New Jersey, U.S. | |
| 8 | Win | 7–1 | (United States) Carlos Vergara | KO | 1 (6) | ? | 30 Jun 1992 | (United States) Pensacola Civic Center, Pensacola, Florida, U.S. | |
| 7 | Win | 6–1 | (United States) Rudy Bradley | TKO | 3 (4) | ? | 2 Apr 1992 | (United States) Reno-Sparks Convention Center, Reno, Nevada, U.S. | |
| 6 | Win | 5–1 | (United States) Willie Richardson | UD | 6 | N/a | 17 Dec 1991 | (United States) Interstate Fairgrounds, Pensacola, Florida, U.S. | |
| 5 | Win | 4–1 | (United States) Outhei Soundara | TKO | 4 (?) | ? | 31 Aug 1991 | (United States) Interstate Fairgrounds, Pensacola, Florida, U.S. | |
| 4 | Win | 3–1 | (United States) Donald Gomez | TKO | 1 (4) | ? | 3 Aug 1991 | (United States) Interstate Fairgrounds, Pensacola, Florida, U.S. | |
| 3 | Loss | 2–1 | (United States) Scott Phillips | SD | 6 | N/a | 8 Nov 1990 | (United States) Bayfront Auditorium, Pensacola, Florida, U.S. | |
| 2 | Win | 2–0 | (United States) Albert Lara | SD | 4 | N/a | 25 Sep 1990 | (United States) Bayfront Auditorium, Pensacola, Florida, U.S. | |
| 1 | Win | 1–0 | (United States) Andrez Francisco Pascual | TKO | 1 (4) | 2:08 | 14 Jul 1990 | (United States) Bayfront Auditorium, Pensacola, Florida, U.S. | Professional debut |

Sporting positions
Minor world boxing titles
| Inaugural champion | IBO featherweight champion November 30, 1993 – 1994; Vacated | Vacant Title next held by Radford Beasley |
World boxing titles
| Vacant Title last held by Freddie Norwood | WBA featherweight champion September 9, 2000 – November 1, 2003 | Succeeded by Juan Manuel Márquez as Super champion |
