= Roy Jones Jr. vs. Virgil Hill =

Boxing match

The Real Gulf War
- Date: April 25, 1998
- Venue: Mississippi Coast Coliseum, Biloxi, Mississippi, U.S.

Tale of the tape
Boxer	Roy Jones Jr.	Virgil Hill
Nickname	Junior	Quicksilver
Hometown	Pensacola, Florida, U.S.	Williston, North Dakota, U.S.
Purse	$4,000,000	$1,000,000
Pre-fight record	35–1 (30 KO)	43–2 (20 KO)
Age	29 years, 3 months	34 years, 3 months
Height	5 ft 11 in (180 cm)	6 ft 1/2 in (184 cm)
Weight	177 lb (80 kg)	176 1/2 lb (80 kg)
Style	Orthodox	Orthodox
Recognition	WBC; Light Heavyweight Champion "in recess" The Ring No. 2 ranked pound-for-pound fighter 3-division world champion	WBA; No. 1 Ranked Light Heavyweight; IBF; No. 5 Ranked Light Heavyweight; Former two time light heavyweight champion

Result
- Jones wins via fourth-round knockout

Roy Jones Jr. vs. Virgil Hill, billed as The Real Gulf War, was a professional boxing match contested on April 25, 1998.

== Background ==
Following his August 1997 victory over Montell Griffin, Roy Jones Jr. was linked to his WBC mandatory Michael Nunn. However, in November 1997 he vacated his belt to move up to heavyweight with a $6,000,000 deal to face former undisputed champion Buster Douglas on the table. Ultimately however Jones's father convinced him to stay at light heavyweight, telling him he was "risking his life" by fighting Douglas. Instead Jones signed to fight former light heavyweight champion Virgil Hill in a 12-round non-title fight at a 177 1/2 lb catchweight. HBO had been set to broadcast a bout between Ike Quartey and Pernell Whitaker, but following Whitaker testing positive for drugs, Jones agreed to face Hill to replace it.

Hill had been out of the ring since his loss to WBO titleholder Dariusz Michalczewski in June 1997.

In March Graciano Rocchigiani defeated Michael Nunn to win the WBC title that Jones vacated, with its president Jose Sulaiman installing Jones as his mandatory challenger, naming him a "champion in recess".

Jones was a 6–1 favourite to win.

== The fight ==
Hill started the fight as the aggressor, but would be hit with accurate counters to the head from Jones. In the second round Jones landed a sharp right hand to Hill's chin over a jab. In the fourth round, a counter right to the body sent Hill down to canvas clearly in pain. He rose at the count of 8, but referee Fred Steinwinder III waved it off giving Jones a KO victory.

== Aftermath ==
Hill was taken to a hospital after the bout, as the ringside physician suspected that a rib might have been broken. Speaking in the ring Jones said "I hope Virgil is O.K., I don't do this to hurt anybody" before adding "Virgil came out up for the fight. He was bouncing around. His legs were strong. In the third round he started breathing hard. I knew then that I had him. I thought coming into the fight that I would go a few rounds and let him get tired. Then, I'd catch him with what I wanted to catch him with. I don't know anybody who can stand what I dish out."

Jones would next sign to challenge WBA champion Lou Del Valle.

== Undercard ==
Confirmed bouts:

Winner	Loser	Weight division/title belt(s) disputed	Result
(United States) Derrick Gainer	(Dominican Republic) Wilson Santos	Lightweight (10 rounds)	3rd round KO
(United Kingdom) Adrian Stone	(United States) Dezi Ford	Welterweight (8 rounds)	4th round TKO
(United States) Victor McKinnis	(United States) Michael Moss	Welterweight (8 rounds)	3rd round TKO
(United States) Will McIntyre	(United States) Robert Koon	Welterweight (8 rounds)	Majority decision
(United States) Kareem Ali	(United States) Tracy Barrios	Cruiserweight (6 rounds)	4th round KO
(United States) Songul Oruc	(United States) Jeanne Martinez	Lightweight (4 rounds)	3rd round TKO
(United States) Mark Lanton	(United States) Cordell Parker	Super middleweight (4 rounds)	Unanimous decision
(United States) Lemuel Nelson	(United States) Gary Richardson	Welterweight (4 rounds)	3rd round KO
(United States) Gabe Brown	(United States) Lewis Gilbert	Heavyweight (4 rounds)	1st round TKO

== Broadcasting ==
Country	Broadcaster
United States	HBO

Preceded by vs. Montell Griffin II	Roy Jones Jr.'s bouts 25 April 1998	Succeeded by vs. Lou Del Valle
Preceded by vs. Dariusz Michalczewski	Virgil Hill's bouts 25 April 1998	Succeeded by vs. James Hayes
Awards
Previous: Arturo Gatti vs. Gabriel Ruelas	The Ring Knockout of the Year; 1998	Next: Derrick Jefferson vs. Maurice Harris
