= Lou Del Valle vs. Roy Jones Jr. =

Boxing match

- Date: July 18, 1998
- Venue: The Theater at Madison Square Garden, New York City, New York, U.S.
- Title(s) on the line: WBA light heavyweight title

Tale of the tape
Boxer	Lou Del Valle	Roy Jones Jr.
Nickname	Honey Boy	Junior
Hometown	Long Island City, New York, U.S.	Pensacola, Florida, U.S.
Purse	$850,000	$2,000,000
Pre-fight record	27–1 (19 KO)	36–1 (31 KO)
Age	30 years	29 years, 6 months
Height	6 ft 0 in (183 cm)	5 ft 11 in (180 cm)
Weight	175 lb (79 kg)	175 lb (79 kg)
Style	Southpaw	Orthodox
Recognition	WBA; Light Heavyweight Champion	WBC; Light Heavyweight Champion "in recess" The Ring No. 2 ranked pound-for-pound fighter 3-division world champion

Result
- Jones wins by unanimous decision (118–109, 118–109, 119–108)

Lou Del Valle vs. Roy Jones Jr. was a professional boxing match contested on July 18, 1998, for the WBA light heavyweight championship.

== Background ==
After knocking out fellow former champion Virgil Hill in four rounds, in his first bout for 8 months in April, Roy Jones Jr. agreed to challenge WBA champion Lou Del Valle. Del Valle, a former sparring partner to Jones, had won the WBA belt in September 1997 (which had been vacated by Lineal champion Dariusz Michalczewski in July) by stopping Eddy Smulders of the Netherlands in the eighth round.

Despite its billing as a unification bout, Jones was not recognized as the full WBC champion, that being Graciano Rocchigiani with Jones classed as a "champion in recess".

The champion Del Valle was a 15 to 1 underdog.

== The fight ==
Jones would dominate the action, using his speed to out boxed the champion, landed frequently to the body. Del Valle was cut over the left eye from an accidental headbutt in the 7th round. In the 8th, a quick counter right left combination sent Jones down for the first time in his career, but he made it to his feet and did not appear badly hurt. Del Valle wasn't able to take advantage, and at the end of 12 rounds all three judges would score the bout for Jones with scores of 118–109, 118–109 and 119–108, making him a three time light heavyweight champion.

HBO's unofficial ringside scorer Harold Lederman scored the fight 118–109 for Jones. According to CompuBox, Jones landed 233 of 483 punches thrown (a 48.2% connect rate) against DelValle, landing 113 of 286 (a 39.5% connect rate).

== Aftermath ==
Speaking after the bout, Jones said "It's very difficult fighting your sparring partner, he knows all your tricks. That's why I don't like to fight sparring partners." He would describe the punch that floored him as a "good shot. A darn good shot".

By October, the WBC had demoted its light heavyweight champion Graciano Rocchigiani to interim champion after inexplicably claiming that all contractual and promotional references to the Rocchigiani-Nunn fight as a championship bout, as well as listing Rocchigiani as their light heavyweight champion after the bout, were "typographical errors." As a consequence, Jones was elevated by the WBC to their full champion, making him a unified light heavyweight champion.

== Undercard ==
Confirmed bouts:

Winner	Loser	Weight division/title belt(s) disputed	Result
(United States) Derrick Gainer	(United States) Kevin Kelley	Lightweight (10 rounds)	Unanimous decision
Preliminary bouts
(United States) John Brown	(United States) Lemuel Nelson	Lightweight (8 rounds)	Unanimous decision
(Nigeria) David Izon	(United States) Marion Wilson	Heavyweight (8 rounds)	Unanimous decision
(United States) Victor McKinnis	(United States) Luis Rosado	Welterweight (8 rounds)	5th-round TKO
(United States) Songul Oruc	(United States) Carla Witherspoon	Super lightweight (4 rounds)	Unanimous decision
(United States) Gabe Brown	(United States) Calvin Smith	Heavyweight (4 rounds)	1st-round KO
(Albania) Elvir Muriqi	(United States) Billy Desser	Super middleweight (4 rounds)	Unanimous decision

== Broadcasting ==
Country	Broadcaster
United States	HBO

Preceded by vs. Eddy Smulders	Lou Del Valle's bouts 18 July 1998	Succeeded by vs. Tyrone Armstead
Preceded by vs. Virgil Hill	Roy Jones Jr.'s bouts 18 July 1998	Succeeded by vs. Otis Grant
