= Cedric Kushner =

Boxing promoter

Cedric Kushner (July 16, 1948 – January 29, 2015) was a South African-born American boxing promoter and manager. In the late 1990s he was one of the most significant promoters in the sport. Boxers he promoted and/or managed included Hasim Rahman, Shannon Briggs, Oleg Maskaev, Chris Byrd, Corrie Sanders, Ike Ibeabuchi and David Tua.

The highlight of Kushner's career came in 2001 when he matched Rahman against Lennox Lewis for the heavyweight championship in his native South Africa. Rahman won, but rather than signing with Kushner after the fight, he signed with rival promoter Don King.

Kushner briefly co-managed the heavy metal band AC/DC.

Kushner died of a heart attack in January 2015. He was 66.

== See also ==
- Cedric Kushner Promotions, Ltd. v. King
