= Roy Jones Jr. vs. Éric Lucas =

Basketball Jones?
- Date: June 15, 1996
- Venue: Jacksonville Coliseum, Jacksonville, Florida, U.S.
- Title(s) on the line: IBF Super Middleweight title

Tale of the tape
Boxer	Roy Jones Jr.	Éric Lucas
Nickname	Junior	Lucky
Hometown	Pensacola, Florida, U.S.	Montreal, Quebec, Canada
Purse	$1,500,000	$100,000
Pre-fight record	31–0 (27 KO)	19–2–2 (5 KO)
Age	27 years, 4 months	25 years
Height	5 ft 11 in (180 cm)	6 ft 0 in (183 cm)
Weight	166 lb (75 kg)	166 lb (75 kg)
Style	Orthodox	Orthodox
Recognition	IBF; Super Middleweight champion The Ring No. 2 ranked pound-for-pound fighter 2-division world champion	IBF; No. 12 Ranked Super Middleweight

Result
- Jones wins via 11th-round corner retirement

Roy Jones Jr. vs. Éric Lucas, billed as Basketball Jones?, was a professional boxing match contested on June 15, 1996, for the IBF super middleweight title.

== Background ==
On May 14, 1996, reigning IBF super middleweight champion Roy Jones Jr.'s next title defense was announced to occur one month later against fringe contender Éric Lucas. However, this defense was no ordinary one for Jones, as it was also announced that Jones would first compete in a professional basketball game for the United States Basketball League's Jacksonville Barracudas, whom Jones played point guard for in addition to his boxing career, with Jones intent on becoming the first athlete to compete in two different sports professionally within a 24-hour day. Jones insisted that the act was not a publicity stunt nor did he intend to disrespect his opponent Lucas, stating "don't take what I'm doing as a stunt. I don't create stunts. I'm doing it because I want to try to do something different in life. I want boxing to have a better name. I'm trying to do my sport a favor and do myself a favor at the same time." Jones, then The Ring magazine's number-two ranked pound-for-pound fighter was an overwhelming favorite over Lucas, who was only the 12th-ranked super middleweight contender by the IBF, with odds reportedly 100 to 1 in Jones' favor.

Jones completed the first part of his two-sport doubleheader playing approximately 15 minutes and scoring five points on 2-4 shooting during a Barracudas victory over the Treasure City Tropics. Jones had been averaging just over four points and 21 minutes per game up to that point. The game ended at 4:08 PM, giving Jones just over 6 hours between sports, as his fight started at 10:39 PM. Jones told reporters after the game that he "felt good."

== The Fight ==
Having knocked out all four of his opponents he had faced in title defenses no later than the sixth round, Jones dominated Lucas through 11 rounds, but struggled to put Lucas away, as the Canadian proved to be durable and able to take Jones' punches. Lucas was unable to land many punches on the elusive Jones, as he only landed 90 of the 306 punches he threw, while Jones landed over triple the amount of punches Lucas did, having scored with 316 of the 746 punches he threw. The ending came between rounds 11 and 12, with Lucas' face having sustained a vast amount of punishment to the point that he had suffered a gash above his right eye and had his nose broken. After conferring with the ringside physician who decided Lucas should not continue, referee Brian Garry stopped the fight.

== Fight card ==
Confirmed bouts:

Weight Class	Weight		vs.		Method	Round	Notes
Super Middleweight	168 lbs.	Roy Jones Jr. (c)	def.	Éric Lucas	RTD	11/12	^{note 1}
Featherweight	126 lbs.	Kevin Kelley (c)	def.	Derrick Gainer	KO	8/12	^{note 2}
Middleweight	160 lbs.	Keith Mullings	def.	Anthony Bradley	TKO	3/8
Heavyweight	190+ lbs.	Ezra Sellers	def.	Earl Talley	TKO	1/8
Middleweight	160 lbs.	Jason Papillion	def.	Earl Allen	TKO	3/8
Heavyweight	190+ lbs.	Paul Madison	def.	Mitch Sammons	KO	2/8
Lightweight	135 lbs.	Lemuel Nelson	def.	Jonathan Sciandra	TKO	1/6
Welterweight	147 lbs.	Victor McKinnis	def.	Daryn Thomas	TKO	4/6

^Note 1 For IBF Super Middleweight title
^Note 2 For WBU Featherweight title

== Broadcasting ==
Country	Broadcaster
United States	HBO

Preceded by vs. Merqui Sosa	Roy Jones Jr.'s bouts 15 June 1996	Succeeded by vs. Bryant Brannon
Preceded by vs. Karl Willis	Éric Lucas's bouts 15 June 1996	Succeeded by vs. Richard Frazier
