= Brian Cohen (boxer) =

American boxer

- Born: 20 March 1976 (age 50); Pittsburgh, Pennsylvania, United States
- Weight: 168 lb (76 kg; 12 st 0 lb)
- Division: super middleweight light heavyweight
- Style: Boxing
- Years active: 1995–1996, 2004, 2008–2010

Professional boxing record
- Total: 18
- Wins: 15
- By knockout: 14
- Losses: 2
- By knockout: 2
- Draws: 0
- No contests: 1

Other information
- Occupation: Boxer; Promoter; Manager
- Boxing record from BoxRec
- Last updated on: 16 March 2017

Brian Cohen (born March 20, 1976) is a retired American professional boxer and a current boxing manager. Also known for being the husband of Kali Reis.

During his professional boxing career, Cohen was ranked in the top 40 of the WBC and has held the WBC Continental Americas light heavyweight title. Cohen fought his last bout in 2010, fighting for the first time outside of USA in New Zealand. After retiring, Cohen became a manager, focusing on women boxers.

== Notable boxers managed ==
- (United States) Cornelius Lock
- (Haiti) Melissa St. Vil
- (United States) Ronica Jeffrey
- (United States) Eileen Olszewski

== Professional boxing titles ==
- USA State Titles
  - USA Mid American light heavyweight title (174 Ibs)
  - USA Mid West light heavyweight title (174 Ibs)
  - USA Indiana State light heavyweight title (174 Ibs)
- North American Boxing Council
  - NABC Light Heavyweight Title (174 Ibs)
- C.A.M. Light Heavyweight Title (174 Ibs)
- World Boxing Council
  - WBC Continental Americas light heavyweight title (169 Ibs)

== Professional boxing record ==
18 fights	15 wins	2 losses
By knockout	14	2
By decision	1	0
Draws	0	
No contests	1	

No.	Result	Record	Opponent	Type	Round, time	Date	Location	Notes
18	NC	15–2 (1)	(Fiji) Taito Ratuere	NC	2 (12)	21 August 2010	Panmure Lagoon Stadium, Panmure, New Zealand	vacant WBO Oriental super middleweight title
17	Win	15–2	(United States) Jason Wilson	TKO	2 (6); 1:58	22 May 2010	(United States) Kewadin Casino, Sault Sainte Marie, Michigan, USA	
16	Win	14–2	(United States) Shawn Kirk	TKO	2 (4); 0:26	12 December 2009	(United States) Ranson Civic Center, Ranson, West Virginia, USA	
15	Win	13–2	(United States) James Morrow	TKO	1; 1:00	29 August 2009	(United States) Benton Convention Center, Winston-Salem, North Carolina, USA	
14	Win	12–2	(Mexico) Hector Ramirez	TKO	2 (4); 0:32	25 July 2009	(United States) St. Paul Armory, Saint Paul, Minnesota, USA	
13	Win	11–2	(United States) Robbie Tovar	KO	1 (8); 1:40	9 May 2009	(United States) South Philadelphia High School, Philadelphia, Pennsylvania, USA	vacant WBC Continental Americas light heavyweight title
12	Lose	10–2	(United States) Billy Bailey	KO	2 (8); 1:45	31 January 2009	(United States) South Philadelphia High School, Philadelphia, Pennsylvania, USA	USA Mid American & vacant WBC United States (USNBC) light heavyweight title
11	Win	10–1	(United States) Stevie Robinson	KO	2 (8); 0:53	6 December 2008	(United States) Riehle Brothers Pavilion, Lafayette, Indiana, USA	
10	Win	9–1	(United States) Tony Ault	KO	2 (8); 0:38	28 November 2008	(United States) Convention Center, Sioux Falls, South Dakota, USA	
9	Win	8–1	(United States) Ray Cuningham	KO	2 (8); 0:28	18 October 2008	(United States) Johanning Civic Center, Kokomo, Indiana, USA	vacant USA Mid American, vacant USA Mid West, vacant USA Indiana State, vacant NABC & vacant C.A.M. Light Heavyweight Titles
8	Win	7–1	(United States) Seth Walker	KO	1 (4); 0:35	20 September 2008	(United States) Cox Convention Center, Oklahoma City, Oklahoma, USA	
7	Win	6–1	(United States) Roy Timmons	TKO	1; 1:05	11 September 2008	(United States) Red & Jerrys, Denver, Colorado, USA	
6	Win	5–1	(United States) Montreze Evans	TKO	3 (4)	31 August 2008	(United States) Fortune Bay Casino, Tower, Minnesota, USA	
5	Win	4–1	(United States) Brian Foster	TKO	1 (4); 1:10	17 May 2008	(United States) Riehle Brothers Pavilion, Lafayette, Indiana, USA	
4	Win	3–1	(United States) Rashaan Goins	SD	4	14 May 2004	(United States) New Alhambra, Philadelphia, Pennsylvania, USA	
3	Win	2–1	(United States) Nick Cocaj	TKO	2 (4)	28 August 2004	(United States) Lagoon Nightclub, Essington, Pennsylvania, USA	
2	Win	1–1	(United States) Melvin Withers	TKO	2 (4)	1 March 1996	(United States) Blue Horizon, Philadelphia, Pennsylvania, USA	
1	Lose	0–1	(United States) Theon Holland	TKO	2 (4)	13 January 1995	(United States) Ballys Park Place Hotel Casino, Atlantic City, New Jersey, USA	Professional debut
