= Lennox Lewis vs. Francois Botha =

Boxing match

The Homecoming
- Date: 15 July 2000
- Venue: London Arena, London, England
- Title(s) on the line: WBC, IBF, and IBO heavyweight titles

Tale of the tape
Boxer	Lennox Lewis	Francois Botha
Nickname	The Lion	The White Buffalo
Hometown	London, England	Pretoria, Gauteng, South Africa
Pre-fight record	36–1–1 (28 KO)	40–2–1 (1) (24 KO)
Age	34 years, 10 months	31 years, 9 months
Height	6 ft 5 in (196 cm)	6 ft 2 in (188 cm)
Weight	250 lb (113 kg)	236 lb (107 kg)
Style	Orthodox	Orthodox
Recognition	WBC, IBF and IBO; Heavyweight Champion	WBC; No. 9 Ranked Heavyweight; IBF; No. 13 Ranked Heavyweight

Result
- Lewis wins via 2nd-round TKO

Lennox Lewis vs. Francois Botha, billed as The Homecoming, was a heavyweight professional boxing match contested between WBC, IBF, and IBO champion Lennox Lewis and the WBC's #9 ranked contender Francois Botha. The bout took place on 15 July 2000 at the London Arena in England. Lewis defeated Botha via second-round technical knockout to retain his heavyweight titles.

== Background ==
Following an easy victory over the previously undefeated Michael Grant on 29 April, Lennox Lewis agreed to make his next defense against South African contender Francois Botha. The fight was also announced to take place in Lewis' native London, making it his first championship fight there since being defeated by Oliver McCall in 1994. Botha, meanwhile, was coming off an impressive performance against Mike Tyson in which he dominated the former undisputed champion for four rounds before Tyson was able to land a quick right hand in the fifth round to earn a knockout victory. Botha then fought a close majority draw with fellow heavyweight contender Shannon Briggs and earned an easy first-round knockout victory over journeyman Steve Pannell before landing the championship fight with Lewis. Lewis, however, faced criticism for choosing to face Botha, who was ranked at number nine by the WBC and not ranked at all by the IBF. Though Botha came into the fight as a huge underdog, he remained confident that he could defeat Lewis stating "If I don’t knock him out, it’s going to be a terrible beating."

On the undercard highly regarded contender Wladimir Klitschko (WBC/WBA:3rd IBF:7th) stopped Monte Barrett (IBF:12th WBC:13th) in the 7th round after knocking him down 5 times.

== The fight ==
Like in his previous fight with Grant, Lewis would make short work of Botha. Lewis dominated the duration of the fight, landing 24 of his 47 thrown punches while Botha only managed to land nine punches through the entire fight while opting to take a more defensive approach. With one minute left in the first round, Lewis staggered Botha with a right hook, but Botha managed to stay on his feet and avoid the knockdown. Lewis attempted to capitalize and pursued Botha aggressively in an attempt to gain a knockdown, but Botha was able to weather Lewis' attack by clinching and survived the first round without being knocked down. In the second round, Botha tried to keep his distance from Lewis and offered very little offence in the round. With about 40 seconds left in the round, Lewis was able to land a powerful four punch combination that knocked Botha halfway out of the ring. Botha crawled back in and was able to get back on his feet but was clearly hurt from the exchange, prompting referee Larry O'Connell to stop the fight, handing Lewis his second consecutive second-round knockout victory.

== Aftermath ==
After the bout Lewis responded to Mike Tyson's comments after his victory over Lou Savarese in Glasgow the previous month saying "Tell Mike Tyson to either put up or shut up. He's been talking about what he can eat," before he held up his right hand and said "I'll show him what he can eat."

== Undercard ==
Confirmed bouts:

== Broadcasting ==
Country	Broadcaster
Australia	Main Event
United Kingdom	Sky Sports
United States	HBO

Preceded by vs. Michael Grant	Lennox Lewis' bouts 15 July 2000	Succeeded by vs. David Tua
Preceded by vs. Steve Pannell	Francois Botha's bouts 15 July 2000	Succeeded by vs. Tony LaRosa
