= David Izonritei =

Nigerian boxer (born 1968)

David Izon
Personal information
- Nationality: Nigerian
- Born: David Izonritei; 29 April 1968 (age 58) Lagos, Nigeria
- Height: 6 ft 3 in (191 cm)
- Weight: Heavyweight

Boxing career
- Reach: 83 in (211 cm)
- Stance: Orthodox

Boxing record
- Total fights: 33
- Wins: 27
- Win by KO: 23
- Losses: 6
- Draws: 0

David Izonritei
Medal record

Men's Boxing

Representing Nigeria

Olympic Games
Silver medal – second place	1992 Barcelona	Heavyweight

All-Africa Games
Gold medal – first place	1991 Cairo	Heavyweight

David Izonritei (born 29 April 1968) is a Nigerian former boxer. Also known as David Izon, Izonritei won the Heavyweight silver medal at the 1992 Summer Olympics. During his professional career, he defeated world title challengers Derrick Jefferson and Lou Savarese.

== Amateur career ==
Izon had an amateur record that included a silver medal at the 1992 Barcelona Olympics. On his way to the silver medal Izon beat the highly regarded pair of David Tua of New Zealand, and Kirk Johnson of Canada. He lost to Félix Savón of Cuba in the final.

== Professional career ==
Izon began his pro career with 18 consecutive victories prior to being upset by Maurice Harris. In his next fight Izon took on David Tua, and after 11 rounds of action, Tua knocked out Izon. Izon notably defeated Lou Savarese before losing to Michael Grant, who was undefeated at the time of the fight. Izon then put together a streak of wins before losing his last three fights and retiring from boxing in 2003.

== Professional boxing record ==
27 Wins (23 knockouts, 4 decisions), 6 Losses (4 knockouts, 2 decisions)
Result	Record	Opponent	Type	Round	Date	Location	Notes
Loss	27-6	(United States) Al Cole	UD	8	1 Mar 2003	(United States) Las Vegas, Nevada, U.S.	
Loss	27-5	(United States) Joe Mesi	KO	9	18/10/2002	(United States) Buffalo, New York, U.S.	Izon knocked out at 0:09 of the ninth round.
Loss	27-4	(United States) Fres Oquendo	TKO	3	01/12/2001	(United States) New York City, U.S.	Referee stopped the bout at 2:54 of the third round.
Win	27-3	(Mexico) Mike Sedillo	TKO	3	20/10/2000	(United States) Auburn Hills, Michigan, U.S.	Referee stopped the bout at 0:24 of the third round.
Win	26-3	(The Bahamas) Reynaldo Minus	TKO	2	20/05/2000	(United States) Biloxi, Mississippi, U.S.	Referee stopped the bout at 0:33 of the second round.
Win	25-3	(United States) Derrick Jefferson	TKO	9	15/01/2000	(United States) New York City, U.S.	Referee stopped the bout at 0:11 of the ninth round.
Win	24-3	(United States) Garing Lane	UD	8	28/08/1999	(United States) Tunica, Mississippi, U.S.	
Win	23-3	(United States) Terrence Lewis	KO	5	04/06/1999	(United States) Biloxi, Mississippi, U.S.	Lewis knocked out at 1:38 of the fifth round.
Win	22-3	(United States) Darroll Wilson	KO	4	14 Nov 1998	(United States) Mashantucket, Connecticut, U.S.	
Win	21-3	(United States) Marion Wilson	UD	8	18 Jul 1998	(United States) New York City, U.S.	
Loss	20-3	(United States) Michael Grant	TKO	5	17/01/1998	(United States) Atlantic City, New Jersey, U.S.	IBC heavyweight title. Referee stopped the bout at 1:07 of the fifth round.
Win	20-2	(United States) Lou Savarese	KO	5	01/11/1997	(United States) New York City, U.S.	Savarese knocked out at 2:44 of the fifth round.
Win	19-2	(United States) Harry Daniels	KO	1	11/09/1997	(United States) Tallahassee, Florida, U.S.	
Loss	18-2	(New Zealand) David Tua	TKO	12	21/12/1996	(United States) Uncasville, Connecticut, U.S.	WBC International heavyweight title. Referee stopped the bout at 1:54 of the 12th round.
Loss	18-1	(United States) Maurice Harris	UD	8	15/03/1996	(United States) Atlantic City, New Jersey, U.S.	
Win	18-0	(United States) Brian Morgan	TKO	8	15/12/1995	Sedan, Ardennes, France	
Win	17-0	(United States) Cleveland Woods	TKO	8	04/11/1995	(United States) Las Vegas, Nevada, U.S.	
Win	16-0	(United States) Kimmuel Odum	TKO	5	24/10/1995	Levallois-Perret, France	
Win	15-0	(United States) Marion Wilson	DQ	5	23/08/1995	Le Cannet, France	
Win	14-0	(United States) Dan Kosmicki	TKO	5	02/07/1995	(Republic of Ireland) Dublin, Ireland	Referee stopped the bout at 1:47 of the fifth round.
Win	13-0	(United States) Arturo Lopez	KO	2	11/04/1995	Levallois-Perret, France	
Win	12-0	(United States) Bill Corrigan	KO	1	01/04/1995	Levallois-Perret, France	
Win	11-0	(United States) Ali Allen	KO	2	04/03/1995	(United States) Atlantic City, New Jersey, U.S.	Allen knocked out at 1:48 of the second round.
Win	10-0	(United States) Mike Robinson	TKO	5	04/02/1995	Beziers, France	
Win	9-0	(United States) William Campudani	KO	1	03/12/1994	Salta, Argentina	
Win	8-0	(United States) Isaac Poole	KO	2	16/11/1994	Buenos Aires, Argentina	
Win	7-0	(United States) Rick Sullivan	PTS	6	29/10/1994	Menucourt, France	
Win	6-0	(United States) Krishna Wainwright	TKO	6	14/07/1994	Monte Carlo, Monaco	
Win	5-0	(Hungary) Laszlo Paszterko	TKO	3	17/04/1994	Clermont-Ferrand, France	
Win	4-0	(France) Phillipe Houyvet	TKO	5	19/03/1994	Levallois-Perret, France	
Win	3-0	(France) Jean Michel Vauquelin	TKO	2	12/02/1994	Cergy-Pontoise, France	
Win	2-0	(United States) Earl Talley	KO	1	16/10/1993	Levallois-Perret, France	
Win	1-0	(France) Carlos Guerreiro	TKO	1	06/03/1993	Levallois-Perret, France	

== Personal ==
David's brothers, Roger and Emmanuel Izonritei, are also professional boxers. David lives in Pensacola, FL with his wife, Laurence (French) and two children, Melissa and Ian.
