= Faleatiu =

Coordinates: 13°49′46.43″S 171°58′39.42″W

Faleatiu is a village on the island of Upolu in Samoa. The village is on the north-west coast of the island and forms part of A'ano Alofi 4 Electoral Constituency (Faipule District) which forms part of the larger A'ana political district.

The population is 675.

The village is the ancestral home of boxer David Tua.
