= Ronica Jeffrey =

American boxer (born 1983)

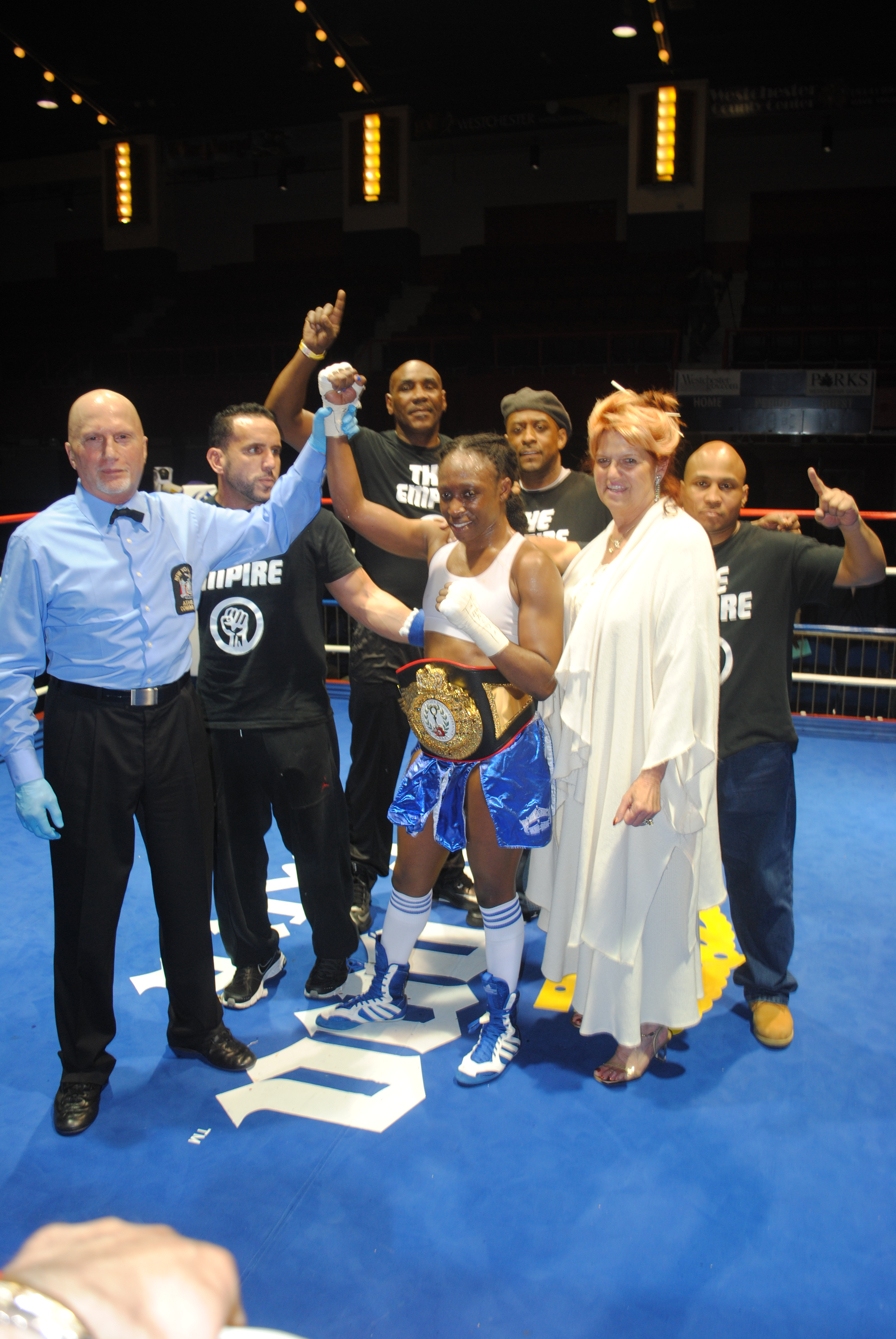
- Referee Ron Lipton with boxing champion Ronica Jeffrey

Personal information
- Nickname: Queen
- Nationality: American
- Born: January 23, 1983 (age 43) New York
- Weight: Super-bantamweight

Boxing career

Boxing record
- Wins: 17
- Win by KO: 1
- Losses: 1
- Draws: 1
- No contests: 0

Ronica Jeffrey (born January 24, 1983, Brooklyn, New York) is the International Women's Boxing Federation World Super Featherweight champion. Her professional boxing record is 17-1-1. Jeffrey is managed by Brian Cohen. She is a member of the International Women's Boxing Hall of Fame.

== World Championship Bout with Olivia Gerula ==
On May 24, 2013, in the main event at Westchester County Center in White Plains, New York, Jeffrey, a former World Boxing Council Silver titleholder, won the vacant IWBF World Super Featherweight title by ten round unanimous decision over former World Boxing Council Super Featherweight Female World Champion Olivia Gerula of Winnipeg, Canada, fighting in her sixth consecutive world title bout. Scorecards were 99-91, 99-91, and 98-92 for Ronica Jeffrey.

Ronica Jeffrey emerged from the bout ranked as the BoxRec number three female featherweight boxer in the world, a significant achievement. There were no clinches, holds or fouls in the title contest refereed by Ron Lipton.

In October 2025, she was named among the inductees for the 2026 International Women's Boxing Hall of Fame class.
