= Keith Mullings =

Jamaican boxer (1968–2021)

Personal information
- Nickname: Brooklyn Assassin
- Born: 8 January 1968 Manchester Parish, Jamaica
- Died: 29 May 2021 (aged 53)
- Height: 5 ft 9 1/2 in (177 cm)
- Weight: Light middleweight

Boxing career
- Reach: 74 1/2 in (189 cm)
- Stance: Orthodox

Boxing record
- Total fights: 25
- Wins: 16
- Win by KO: 11
- Losses: 8
- Draws: 1

Keith Mullings (8 January 1968 – 29 May 2021) was a Jamaican professional boxer who competed from 1993 to 2001.

== Professional career ==
Mullings turned pro in 1993 and challenged Raúl Márquez for the IBF light middleweight title in 1997, but lost a split decision. Most of Mullings losses were close or controversial, until late in his career. In Dec of 1997, Mullings shocked the world with a ninth-round TKO over WBC and lineal light middleweight champion Terry Norris. After one defense, he lost the belt to Javier Castillejo in 1999 via majority decision in the opponent's hometown of Madrid. Later that year he took on former Olympian David Reid for the WBA light middleweight title, but lost a decision. In 2000 he lost a decision to Winky Wright, and retired in 2001, after his only knockout loss.

== Professional boxing record ==
25 fights	16 wins	8 losses
By knockout	11	1
By decision	5	7
Draws	1	

No.	Result	Record	Opponent	Type	Round	Date	Location	Notes
25	Loss	16–8–1	Steve Roberts	TKO	2 (12)	Apr 7, 2000	Conference Centre, Wembley, England, U.K.	
24	Loss	16–7–1	Winky Wright	UD	12	Dec 16, 1999	David L. Lawrence Convention Center, Pittsburgh, Pennsylvania, U.S.	For NABF and USBA light middleweight titles
23	Loss	16–6–1	David Reid	UD	12	Aug 28, 1999	Hard Rock Hotel and Casino, Las Vegas, Nevada, U.S.	For WBA light middleweight title
22	Loss	16–5–1	Javier Castillejo	MD	12	Jan 29, 1999	Plaza de Toros La Cubierta, Leganes, Spain	Lost WBC light middleweight title
21	Win	16–4–1	Davide Ciarlante	RTD	5 (12)	Mar 14, 1998	Trump Taj Mahal, Atlantic City, New Jersey, U.S.	Retained WBC light middleweight title
20	Win	15–4–1	Terry Norris	TKO	9 (12)	Dec 6, 1997	Caesars Hotel & Casino, Atlantic City, New Jersey, U.S.	Won WBC light middleweight title
19	Loss	14–4–1	Raúl Márquez	SD	12	Sep 13, 1997	Thomas & Mack Center, Paradise, Nevada, U.S.	For IBF light middleweight title
18	Win	14–3–1	Donald Stokes	UD	10	Jul 5, 1997	Mark of the Quad Cities, Moline, Illinois, U.S.	
17	Loss	13–3–1	Tony Marshall	UD	10	May 30, 1997	Palace Theatre, Albany, New York, U.S.	
16	Draw	13–2–1	Victor Maciel	TD	3 (?)	Apr 21, 1997	Great Western Forum, Inglewood, California, U.S.	
15	Loss	13–2	Christian Lloyd Joseph	SD	8	Feb 22, 1997	Mohegan Sun Arena, Uncasville, Connecticut, U.S.	
14	Loss	13–1	Darrell Woods	SD	12	Oct 4, 1996	The Theater at Madison Square Garden, Manhattan, New York, U.S.	For NABU light middleweight title
13	Win	13–0	Anthony Bradley	TKO	3 (8)	Jun 15, 1996	Coliseum, Jacksonville, Florida, U.S.	
12	Win	12–0	Charles Hollis	TKO	6 (10)	Dec 8, 1995	Interstate Fairgrounds, Pensacola, Florida, U.S.	
11	Win	11–0	Dennis Ardley	TKO	6 (6)	Sep 30, 1995	Civic Center, Pensacola, Florida, U.S.	
10	Win	10–0	Anthony Joseph	UD	10	Mar 24, 1995	South Mountain Arena, West Orange, New Jersey, U.S.	
9	Win	9–0	Vince Middleton	TKO	1 (?)	Oct 8, 1994	Great Gorge, Vernon, New Jersey, U.S.	
8	Win	8–0	Gill Rosario	TKO	2 (8)	Jun 30, 1994	Ocean Place Hilton, Long Branch, New Jersey, U.S.	
7	Win	7–0	Rafael Fernandez	TKO	5 (?)	May 20, 1994	Hasbrouck Heights, New Jersey, U.S.	
6	Win	6–0	Wayne Richards	TKO	4 (?)	Mar 31, 1994	Huntington Hilton Hotel, Melville, New York, U.S.	
5	Win	5–0	Dario Liriano	UD	6	Jan 24, 1994	Hotel Pennsylvania, Manhattan, New York, U.S.	
4	Win	4–0	Edwardo Leon	UD	6	Nov 19, 1993	Convention Center, Atlantic City, New Jersey, U.S.	
3	Win	3–0	Aaron Mitchell	SD	4	Oct 27, 1993	Ballys Park Place Hotel Casino, Atlantic City, New Jersey, U.S.	
2	Win	2–0	Eric Garland	TKO	2 (?)	Aug 24, 1993	Merv Griffin's Resorts, Atlantic City, New Jersey, U.S.	
1	Win	1–0	Wayne Sharp	TKO	2 (4)	Jul 24, 1993	Showboat Hotel & Casino, Atlantic City, New Jersey, U.S.	

== Later life and death ==
Mullings had been working as a trainer in Peekskill, NY, prior to his death, at age 53. No cause was given, with the announcement.

== See also ==
- List of world light-middleweight boxing champions

Sporting positions
World boxing titles
Preceded by Terry Norris	WBC super welterweight champion 6 December 1997 – 29 January 1999	Succeeded by Javier Castillejo
