= Joey Spina =

American boxer

Personal information
- Nickname: KO Kid
- Born: August 12, 1977 (age 49) Johnston, Rhode Island, U.S.
- Weight: Super middleweight

Boxing career
- Stance: Orthodox

Boxing record
- Total fights: 28
- Wins: 26
- Win by KO: 17
- Losses: 3
- Draws: 2

Joey Spina (born August 12, 1977) is an American former professional boxer.

Joey Spina is a former IBF Inter-Continental Super Middleweight champion and WBC United States (USNBC) Super Middleweight champion. Spina won the WBC United States (USNBC) Super Middleweight title in 2005 when he decisioned Carl Daniels for the vacant title. He won the vacant IBF Inter-Continental Super Middleweight title in 2006 when he stopped Jay Pina in the fourth round.

In October 2006, Spina lost by third round stoppage to Peter Manfredo Jr. in Providence, Rhode Island, the first loss in Spina's career. In October 2007, Spina defeated Shannon Miller by fourth-round technical knockout. In March 2008, Spina decisioned Henry Mayes. Three weeks later, Spina decisioned David Whittom of Quebec.

In August 2008, Spina knocked out Heavyweight Jim Strohl in the second round. Six months later, Spina knocked out Matt Gockel in the first round. In May 2009, Spina defeated Tiwon Taylor by eight-round decision. In October 2009, Spina fought to a draw with former WBA world light heavyweight champion Lou Del Valle.

On Saturday, October 2, 2010, Spina stopped former world title challenger Antwun Echols in the third round of their bout at Fox Theater in the main event of CES Boxing's 'Last Man Standing' eight bout card at Foxwoods Resort Casino in Mashantucket, Connecticut, improving his overall record to 26-1-2 with 18 KOs. The win put Spina, currently ranked sixth in the world among light heavyweights by the World Boxing Association, back into world title contention. He has not had a fight since then.
