= Ron Lipton =

American boxing referee (born 1946)

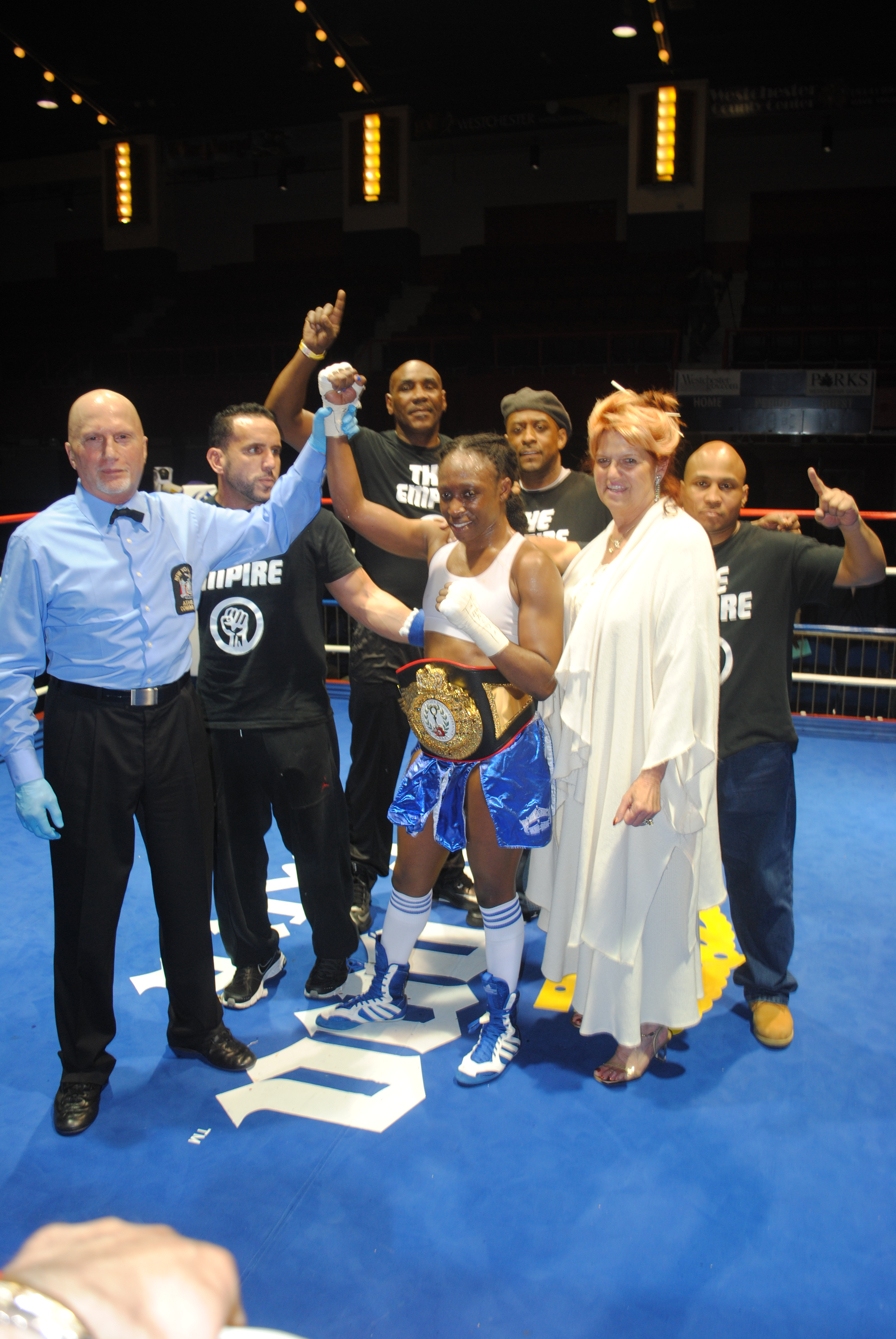
Referee Ron Lipton with boxing champion Ronica Jeffrey

Ron Lipton (born August 8, 1946) is an American boxing referee who has officiated in world title bouts in the United States, Ireland, and Italy and on HBO pay-per-view. He has refereed fights involving Evander Holyfield, Ray Mercer, Roy Jones Jr., Oscar De La Hoya, David Tua, Junior Jones, Chris Eubank, Donovan Ruddock, Pernell Whitaker, and Roberto Durán.

In May 2013, Lipton refereed the vacant Women's International Boxing Federation World Super Featherweight contest between Ronica Jeffrey of Brooklyn, New York, and former World Boxing Council Super Featherweight champion Olivia Gerula of Winnipeg, Manitoba, Canada. The winner, Ronica Jeffrey, emerged as the BoxRec number-three-ranked female featherweight in the world. [3]

In 2014, he was inducted into the New Jersey Boxing Hall of Fame as a "fighter, referee, and boxing historian." In 2015, he was awarded the José Torres Renaissance Boxing Award. In September 2019, Lipton was inducted into the New York State Boxing Hall of Fame.[6]

In June 2022, Lipton's indecision to stop the match between Josue Vargas and Dakota Linger at Madison Square Garden was criticized in the media. In the second round, Vargas was struck by a heavy overhand right that rocked him off his feet. Lipton ruled the fall to be only a slip and allowed the match to continue. Linger forced, wobbly, and stumbling Vargas back onto the floor before New York State Athletic Commission inspectors and ringside doctors climbed onto the ring apron and stopped the fight. [8] Boxer Shakur Stevenson also criticized the decision to allow the match to continue for as long as it did.

== Personal life ==
Ron Lipton's son Brett Lipton was presented honours as a Deputy Sheriff in January 2024 by Dutchess County sheriff Kirk Imperati.
