= Cornelius Lock =

American boxer

Personal information
- Born: Cornelius Eugene Lock; December 12, 1978 (age 47) Detroit, Michigan, U.S.
- Height: 1.70 m (5 ft 7 in)
- Weight: Featherweight

Boxing career
- Reach: 185 cm (73 in)
- Stance: Southpaw

Boxing record
- Total fights: 32
- Wins: 23
- Win by KO: 15
- Losses: 7
- Draws: 2

Cornelius Eugene Lock (born December 12, 1978) is an American professional boxer and a former WBO–NABO featherweight champion.

== Professional career ==
One of the highlights of Lock's career came on September 19, 2009 on the undercard to Floyd Mayweather Jr. vs. Juan Manuel Márquez. Lock stopped then-undefeated Orlando Cruz to win the WBO–NABO featherweight title.

In August 2010, Cornelius lost to undefeated Mikey García in an eliminator for the IBF featherweight world title.

Lock is managed by Brian Cohen.
