= Roy Jones Jr. vs. Bryant Brannon =

Boxing match

Charity Bash
- Date: October 4, 1996
- Venue: The Theater at Madison Square Garden, New York, New York, U.S.
- Title(s) on the line: IBF Super Middleweight title

Tale of the tape
Boxer	Roy Jones Jr.	Bryant Brannon
Nickname	Junior	B.B.
Hometown	Pensacola, Florida, U.S.	Trenton, New Jersey, U.S.
Pre-fight record	32–0 (28 KO)	16–0 (10 KO)
Age	27 years, 8 months	30 years
Height	5 ft 11 in (180 cm)	5 ft 7 in (170 cm)
Weight	168 lb (76 kg)	168 lb (76 kg)
Style	Orthodox	Orthodox
Recognition	IBF; Super Middleweight champion The Ring No. 2 ranked pound-for-pound fighter 2-division world champion	IBF; No. 1 Ranked Super Middleweight

Result
- Jones wins via 2nd-round knockout

Roy Jones Jr. vs. Bryant Brannon, billed as Charity Bash, was a professional boxing match contested on October 4, 1996 for the IBF super middleweight title.

== Background ==
In early September 1996, it was announced that Roy Jones Jr., the reigning IBF super middleweight champion and The Ring magazine's top ranked pound-for-pound fighter, would face Bryant Brannon, the IBF's number-one ranked super middleweight challenger, at The Theater at Madison Square Garden the following month. Jones and Brannon would headline a boxing card dubbed the Charity Bash, named as such because Jones, with help from cable network HBO, would donate the proceeds earned from the gate to three non-profit organizations; the New York City Police Foundation, the NYPD Self Support Group and the Congress of Racial Equality, as well as former boxer Gerald McClellan, who had been severely injured the previous year in a bout against Nigel Benn. The Jones–Brannon bout was supplemented with a WBA welterweight title fight featuring champion Ike Quartey defending against challenger Oba Carr. Jones explained that his decision to hold the event was because "people are always talking about athletes being selfish. I want people to understand we're not robots; we're human beings".

Brief portions of the fight can be seen in the 1997 horror film The Devil's Advocate starring Al Pacino and Keanu Reeves.

== The Fight ==
From the opening bell, Brannon charged Jones, backing him into the ropes for the first minute plus of the first round as he threw a bevy of punches in a vain attempt to penetrate Jones' defense. Finally, roughly midway through the round, Jones landed a left hook which wobble Brannon and sent him on the defensive for the first time. Jones would proceed to land several punches to Brannon's head, ending with a left hook that dropped Brannon to the canvas. Brannon stumbled back to his feet and was allowed to continue the fight by referee Ron Lipton. Jones then spent the remainder of the round landing numerous combinations, though Brannon was able make it through to the end of the round. Jones started off the second round rather tentatively, as Brannon tried to engage Jones but continued to get past Jones defense. Just past the midway point of the second round, Jones dropped Brannon for the second time with another left hook. Though Brannon was clearly dazed, he was able to get back up and was again allowed to continue, though Jones quickly backed him into a corner and landed numerous unanswered punches before a right-left combination sent Brannon down again. Lipton immediately stopped the fight and Jones was declared the winner by technical knockout at 2:23 of the second round.

== Fight card ==
Confirmed bouts:

Weight Class	Weight		vs.		Method	Round	Notes
Super Middleweight	168 lbs.	Roy Jones Jr. (c)	def.	Bryant Brannon	TKO	2/12	^{note 1}
Welterweight	147 lbs.	Ike Quartey (c)	def.	Oba Carr	MD	12/12	^{note 2}
Light Middleweight	154 lbs.	Darrell Woods (c)	def.	Keith Mullings	SD	12/12	^{note 3}
Super Middleweight	168 lbs.	Troy Watson (c)	def.	Billy Lewis	UD	12/12	^{note 4}
Featherweight	126 lbs.	Derrick Gainer	def.	Patrick Simeon	TKO	2/12	^{note 5}
Light Heavyweight	175 lbs.	Charles Brewer	def.	Fermin Chirino	UD	8/8
Lightweight	135 lbs.	Lemuel Nelson	def.	Roberto Sierra	UD	4/4
Welterweight	147 lbs.	Victor McKinnis	def.	Dezi Ford	UD	4/4
Welterweight	147 lbs.	Zab Judah	def.	Pablo Tejada	TKO	4/4

^Note 1 For IBF Super Middleweight title
^Note 2 For WBA Welterweight title
^Note 3 For NABU Light Middleweight title
^Note 4 For NABU Super Middleweight title
^Note 5 For WBC Continental Americas Featherweight title

== Broadcasting ==
Country	Broadcaster
United States	HBO

Preceded by vs. Éric Lucas	Roy Jones Jr.'s bouts 4 October 1996	Succeeded by vs. Mike McCallum
Preceded by vs. Troy Watson	Bryant Brannon's bouts 4 October 1996	Succeeded by vs. Robert Thomas
