= Darroll Wilson =

American boxer

Personal information
- Nickname: Doin' Damage
- Born: Darroll Lamont Wilson; June 8, 1966 (age 60) Danville, Virginia, U.S.
- Height: 6 ft 0 in (1.83 m)
- Weight: Heavyweight

Boxing career
- Reach: 79 in (201 cm)
- Stance: Orthodox

Boxing record
- Total fights: 39
- Wins: 27
- Win by KO: 21
- Losses: 10
- Draws: 2

Darroll Lamont Wilson (born June 8, 1966) is an American former professional boxer who competed from 1993 to 2006. He is best known for his gutsy performances against some of the best fighters of his day, and his upset third-round TKO win over Shannon Briggs. He also beat contenders James Pritchard and Bert Cooper.

== Professional boxing career ==
Known as "Doin' Damage", Wilson was a prospect early in his professional career. He had just one amateur fight; a points loss to Tongan Samson Po'uha in 1992.

After 13 wins and a draw, he fought another unbeaten prospect in Terry McGroom light-heavy Golden Gloves champ. Wilson and McGroom fought to a ten-round draw.

In Wilson's next fight he outpointed an unbeaten heavyweight in James Stanton.

=== Briggs, Tua & Tshabalala fights ===
In 1996, he competed in HBO's "Night of the Young Heavyweights". His unbeaten opponent, 25-0 Shannon Briggs was an amateur star and being touted as a future champ, he was the main feature of the card. In a huge upset, Wilson took Briggs best shots in the opening rounds, turned the tide in the second, then knocked Briggs out for the full count in the third. This is considered by many to be the highlight of Wilson's career. Briggs for a while had the reputation to be "chinny" but wasn't knocked down by George Foreman, reputedly among the greatest punchers in history.

Later that year, 1996, Wilson was brought back to HBO to meet another undefeated top-prospect, the Samoan born, New Zealand Olympic bronze medallist David Tua, who had also won on the previous "young heavys" card. After two minutes of give-and-take the hard hitting Tua KO'ed Wilson in the first round with his lethal left hook.

Wilson had lost, but was still a semi-attraction, and got his second chance when he met once-beaten South African Courage Tshabalala. The two staged one of the most famous fights of the year 1997. In the first round Courage dropped Wilson with a stiff left jab 25 seconds into the fight. Things looked even worse for Wilson when he was dropped again in the third, this time much harder, with a right hand. Courage tried to finish in the fourth but Wilson fought back with the heart he showed in the Briggs fight and leveled his opponent for the count.

=== Decline ===
Wilson's next big fight was an upset loss to Terrence Lewis by fifth-round TKO in 1998. Lewis was a tough and dangerous fighter with a respected right hand, however, the result was still a surprise. Wilson was no longer a fringe contender and dropped to journeyman status.

Wilson was again TKO'ed in his next fight to the hard hitting contender and Olympic silver medallist David Izon. In that fight, Wilson's own power surfaced early, and Izon was dropped in the first round, but Wilson couldn't finish the job.

Since then he slipped dramatically and never regained his old form. In 1999 he lost fights to Frankie Swindell and Zuri Lawrence, and was stopped in two rounds by the bigger and more experienced 2-time heavyweight champion Tim Witherspoon.

Wilson dropped a ten-round decision to Jean-Francois Bergeron and Ray Mercer in 2005 and was stopped inside 4 rounds by Oliver McCall in 2006. Wilson's last professional fight was on December 2, 2006.

== Professional boxing record ==
27 Wins (21 knockouts, 6 decisions), 10 Losses (7 knockouts, 3 decisions), 2 Draws Archived October 29, 2013, at the Wayback Machine
Result	Record	Opponent	Type	Round	Date	Location	Notes
Loss	28–9–2	(United States) Sedreck Fields	KO	7	02/12/2006	(United States) Saint Charles, Missouri, U.S.	Wilson knocked out at 2:43 of the seventh round.
Loss	28–8–2	(United States) Oliver McCall	TKO	4	09/09/2006	(United States) Louisville, Kentucky, U.S.	For vacant WBC FECARBOX heavyweight title. Wilson knocked out at 0:40 of the fourth round.
Loss	28–7–2	(United States) Ray Mercer	UD	10	24/06/2005	(United States) Atlantic City, New Jersey, U.S.	
Loss	28–6–2	(Canada) Jean-Francois Bergeron	UD	10	07/03/2003	Niagara Falls, Ontario, Canada	
Win	28–5–2	(United States) Bert Cooper	RTD	4	20/09/2002	(United States) Philadelphia, Pennsylvania, U.S.	
Loss	27–5–2	(United States) Tim Witherspoon	KO	2	10/03/2002	(United States) Henderson, Nevada, U.S.	Wilson knocked out at 1:02 of the second round.
Win	27–4–2	(United States) Frankie Hines	KO	1	05/10/2001	(United States) Virginia Beach, Virginia, U.S.	
Win	26–4–2	(United States) Mike Rouse	TKO	5	28/04/2001	(United States) Atlantic City, New Jersey, U.S.	
Win	25–4–2	(United States) Ric Lainhart	KO	1	13/04/2001	(United States) Hampton, Virginia, U.S.	
Win	24–4–2	(United States) David Willis	TKO	4	27/02/2001	(United States) Indianapolis, Indiana, U.S.	Referee stopped the bout at 2:50 of the fourth round.
Loss	23–4–2	(United States) Zuri Lawrence	UD	10	02/09/1999	(United States) Saratoga Springs, New York, U.S.	
Loss	23–3–2	(United States) Frankie Swindell	TKO	5	01/07/1999	(United States) Tunica, Mississippi, U.S.	Referee stopped the bout at 1:34 of the fifth round.
Win	22–3–2	(United States) Don Normand	TKO	2	20/05/1999	(United States) Tunica, Mississippi, U.S.	Referee stopped the bout at 2:59 of the second round.
Loss	21–3–2	(Nigeria) David Izon	KO	4	14 Nov 1998	(United States) Ledyard, Connecticut, U.S.	
Win	21–2–2	(United States) Anthony Willis	TKO	5	12/06/1998	(United States) Baton Rouge, Louisiana, U.S.	Referee stopped the bout at 0:32 of the fifth round after Willis was knocked down thrice.
Loss	20–2–2	(United States) Terrence Lewis	TKO	5	03/02/1998	(United States) Philadelphia, Pennsylvania, U.S.	Referee stopped the bout at 0:59 of the fifth round.
Win	20–1–2	(United States) James Pritchard	TKO	2	29/11/1997	(United States) Vineland, New Jersey, U.S.	
Win	19–1–2	(South Africa) Courage Tshabalala	KO	4	03/06/1997	(United States) Philadelphia, Pennsylvania, U.S.	Courage knocked out at 2:41 of the fourth round.
Win	18–1–2	(United States) Ron McCarthy	TKO	6	03/05/1997	(United States) Atlantic City, New Jersey, U.S.	
Loss	17–1–2	(New Zealand) David Tua	KO	1	20/09/1996	(United States) Miami, Florida, U.S.	For WBC International heavyweight title.
Win	17–0–2	(United States) Rick Sullivan	UD	10	18/07/1996	(United States) Boston, Massachusetts, U.S.	
Win	16–0–2	(United States) Shannon Briggs	TKO	3	15/03/1996	(United States) Atlantic City, New Jersey, U.S.	Referee stopped the bout at 2:17 of the third round.
Win	15–0–2	(United States) James Stanton	UD	10	12/12/1995	(United States) Philadelphia, Pennsylvania, U.S.	
Draw	14–0–2	(United States) Terry McGroom	PTS	10	17/08/1995	(United States) Atlantic City, New Jersey, U.S.	
Win	14–0–1	(United States) Doug Davis	PTS	8	22/06/1995	(United States) Atlantic City, New Jersey, U.S.	
Win	13–0–1	(United States) Doug Davis	PTS	8	16/05/1995	(United States) Atlantic City, New Jersey, U.S.	
Win	12–0–1	(United States) Luis Rivera	PTS	8	04/04/1995	(United States) Philadelphia, Pennsylvania, U.S.	
Win	11–0–1	(United States) Russell Perry	TKO	1	22/02/1995	(United States) Philadelphia, Pennsylvania, U.S.	
Win	10–0–1	(United States) Rashid Latif	TKO	1	25/01/1995	(United States) Atlantic City, New Jersey, U.S.	
Win	9–0–1	(United States) Dennis Cain	TKO	3	07/12/1994	(United States) Philadelphia, Pennsylvania, U.S.	
Win	8–0–1	(United States) Mike Robinson	TKO	2	22/10/1994	(United States) Atlantic City, New Jersey, U.S.	
Win	7–0–1	(United States) Ron Gullette	TKO	2	19/08/1994	(United States) Atlantic City, New Jersey, U.S.	
Win	6–0–1	(United States) Robert Doyle	TKO	1	28/07/1994	(United States) Atlantic City, New Jersey, U.S.	
Win	5–0–1	(United States) Delen Parsley	PTS	4	07/05/1994	(United States) Atlantic City, New Jersey, U.S.	
Draw	4–0–1	(United States) Levon Warner	PTS	4	01/03/1994	(United States) Atlantic City, New Jersey, U.S.	
Win	4–0	(United States) Randy Gordon	KO	1	01/02/1994	(United States) Philadelphia, Pennsylvania, U.S.	
Win	3–0	(United States) Derrick Minter	TKO	1	02/10/1993	(United States) Atlantic City, New Jersey, U.S.	
Win	2–0	(United States) Mitchell Rose	TKO	3	07/08/1993	(United States) Atlantic City, New Jersey, U.S.	
Win	1–0	(United States) Wayne Perdue	TKO	2	15/05/1993	(United States) Atlantic City, New Jersey, U.S.	
