= David Tua =

New Zealand boxer (born 1972)

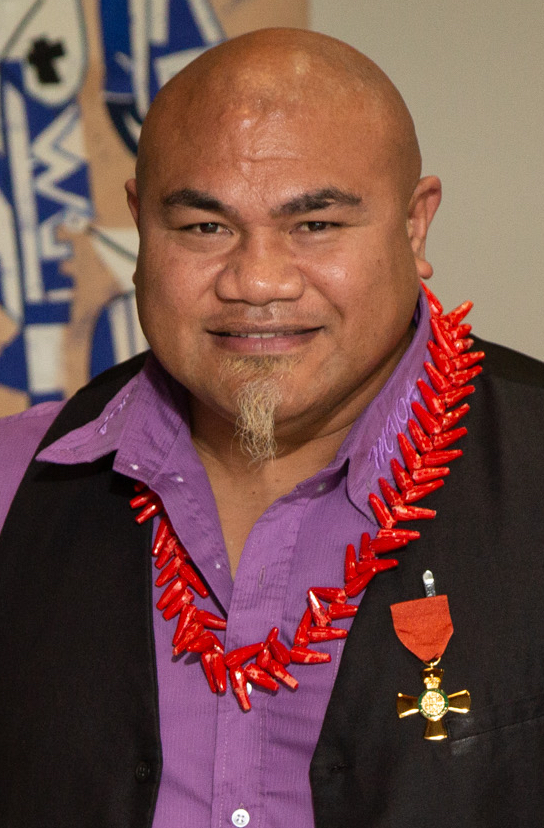
- Tua in 2019

Personal information
- Nicknames: Tuaman; The Tuamanator; The Terminator
- Nationality: Samoan; New Zealand
- Born: Mafaufau Tavita Lio Mafaufau Sanerivi Talimatasi; 21 November 1972 (age 53) Faleatiu, Samoa
- Height: 1.78 m (5 ft 10 in)
- Weight: Heavyweight

Boxing career
- Reach: 178 cm (70 in)
- Stance: Orthodox

Boxing record
- Total fights: 59
- Wins: 52
- Win by KO: 43
- Losses: 5
- Draws: 2
Medal record
Men's amateur boxing
Representing New Zealand
Olympic Games
Bronze medal – third place	1992 Barcelona	Heavyweight
World Championships
Bronze medal – third place	1991 Sydney	Heavyweight
Oceanian Championships
Gold medal – first place	1990 Nukuʻalofa	Heavyweight

Mafaufau Tavita Lio Mafaufau Sanerivi Talimatasi ONZM (born 21 November 1972), known as David Tua, is a Samoan-New Zealand former professional boxer who competed from 1992 to 2013. A highly ranked heavyweight contender for most of his career, Tua is considered by some to be one of the greatest heavyweights to have never won a world title. He was ranked by BoxRec in the world's top 10 heavyweights from 1996 to 2003, reaching his highest BoxRec ranking of No.3 in 1998. He was also ranked the No.1 heavyweight contender in 2000 by the WBC and IBF, leading up to his bout with Lennox Lewis.

Known for his formidable punching power, especially in his left hook, Tua scored sixteen wins by knockout in the first round, including knockouts of future and former world heavyweight champions John Ruiz and Michael Moorer within thirty seconds of the first round. He also scored stoppages of future world champions Oleg Maskaev and Hasim Rahman. Tua ended his career with a knockout-to-win rate of 82.6%. In a 2003 article by The Ring magazine, Tua was ranked 48th on a list of 100 greatest punchers of all time.

Nicknamed the "Tuamanator", his fast-paced bob and weave pressure fighting style has often drawn comparisons to Mike Tyson. Tua fought many of the best boxers of his era and challenged once for the unified world heavyweight title against Lennox Lewis in 2000. In his five professional losses, Tua was never subject to a stoppage and hit the canvas just once as a fighter, which occurred in the fourth-to-last fight of his career. He is thus considered to have one of the most durable chins of his time.

== Early life ==
Tua said that he lived with four brothers, four sisters and ten other relatives while growing up, and his mother held down three jobs while his father worked long hours. He claims that his father forced him to start boxing when he was seven years old, and is grateful for the introduction to the sport.

== Amateur career ==
In his early career, Tua trained three days a week at a small gym in Mangere Bridge, under boxing trainer Gerry Preston. Tua became New Zealand national heavyweight champion in 1988 at age 15.

At the age of 19 Tua won a bronze medal at the 1992 Summer Olympics in Barcelona. He lost his semi-final to David Izonritei, whom he would later knock out as a professional. Tua turned professional later the same year.

=== Highlights ===
Amateur career breakdown:

Bronze at the 1992 Summer Olympics, Barcelona, Spain (Heavyweight (– 91 kg))

Qualified at the 1992 National Olympic Trials, Apia, Samoa (Heavyweight)

Bronze at the 1991 World Championships, Sydney, Australia (Heavyweight)

Gold at the 1991 New Zealand Championships (Heavyweight)

- Finals: Defeated Toakipa Tasefa on points

1990 Junior World Championships, Lima, Peru (Heavyweight)

Gold at the 1990 Oceanian Championships, Nukuʻalofa, Tonga (Heavyweight)

Gold at the 1990 New Zealand Championships (Heavyweight)

Gold at the 1989 New Zealand Championships (Heavyweight)

Gold at the 1986 New Zealand Juniors Championships (Juniormiddleweight)

== Professional career ==
Tua debuted in December 1992. Of his first 27 fights, 23 were won by knockout.

In Tua's 1997 fight against Ike Ibeabuchi, the two fighters combined to set the record for most punches thrown in a heavyweight fight on record. Ibeabuchi won the decision, handing Tua his first professional loss. Prior to this, Tua had scored devastating knockouts against future titlist John Ruiz (via 1st-round KO, in only 19 seconds) and Darroll Wilson. Tua also beat David Izon and future champion Oleg Maskaev to set up the fight with Ibeabuchi. After the loss to Ibeabuchi, Tua took on future champ Hasim Rahman and TKO'd Rahman in the 10th round. The victory over Rahman marked the beginning of Tua's struggles with his weight. He ballooned up to 253 pounds when he defeated Obed Sullivan in 2000 by KO. Later that year, he weighed 245 pounds in the loss to Lennox Lewis. Tua was disappointing in the fight, with both fighters avoiding each other and Tua not throwing combinations. Tua lost a clear-cut decision.

The fight with Lewis was for the WBC, IBF, & IBO heavyweight titles and took place in November 2000. Tua lost on points by a wide margin.

Following the Lewis loss, Tua regained steam with a KO over Danell Nicholson but lost by a close decision in his next fight to future champion Chris Byrd. In 2002 he beat prospect Fres Oquendo and demolished Michael Moorer in his next fight with a powerful shot 30 seconds into the first round, which put Moorer out cold. In 2003 he drew in a 12-round rematch with Rahman.

=== 2005 comeback ===
Tua was inactive for over two years before he stepped into the ring on 31 March 2005 and bested Talmadge Griffis in a 10-round bout—ending the match and earning a TKO victory with 26 seconds remaining. Tua's next contest in October 2005 ended in a split decision over Cisse Salif with Tua dominating in the late rounds.

Tua defeated Edward Gutierrez by knockout in the fourth round of a scheduled 10-rounder on 26 July 2006. The fight was held at the Manhattan Center ballroom in New York City, and featured on ESPN2. Tua started slowly, scored a knockdown with his famous left hook in the second round, and put Gutierrez down for the count in the fourth round with a combination of two left hooks, one to the head and the decisive one to the body.

In November 2006 Tua defeated Maurice Wheeler in the seventh round of a scheduled 10-rounder by knockout. Tua ended the bout with a solid left uppercut to the body which immediately sent the howling Wheeler to the canvas.

Tua continued his comeback in February 2007 with a unanimous decision over Robert Hawkins in a 10-round bout. Tua ended the match being the aggressor and hurt Hawkins in both the ninth and tenth rounds with body punches, but was unable to end the match with a knockout.

Tua, looking in good shape and weighing in at 237½ lbs (his lightest fight weight since 2001), was featured as the main event of a Pay Per View show on 18 August 2007 in Sandy, Utah and ended the bout quickly with a first-round knockout of Mexican champion Saul Montana. Tua threw two powerful left hooks to the head that sent Montana sprawling to the canvas giving Tua his sixth win in a row.

Tua, again looking in good shape and weighing in at 234 lbs, fought the unheralded Cerrone Fox at the Soaring Eagle Casino, Mt. Pleasant, Michigan on 7 September 2007. Tua made short work of his over matched opponent ending the bout at 1:41 of the second round.

While Tua's promoter, Cedric Kushner, stated Tua was scheduled to fight an opponent on 18 October 2007, the fight never materialised.

=== 2009 comeback ===
Tua fought fellow New Zealander Shane Cameron at Mystery Creek, Hamilton on 3 October 2009 with Tua knocking Cameron out seven seconds into the second round to pick up the WBO Asia Pacific and Oriental Heavyweight titles. The promoters for the fight were John McRae and David Higgins of Duco Events. The fight had been scheduled for an earlier date, but was delayed due to Cameron having surgery on a fractured hand.

On 31 March 2010 Tua fought Friday Ahunanya, winning on points after 12 rounds. The fight promoters for this fight were again John McRae and David Higgins of Duco Events.

The Tua-Barrett fight had been tentatively scheduled for 26 June in São Paulo, Brazil. However, the fight was moved to 17 July at the Tropicana Casino and Resort in Atlantic City in a bid to promote David Tua's career in the United States. At 38 years old, Monte Barrett (34-9, 20 KOs) was viewed by some as an easy opponent for Tua as he had lost his previous three fights. The match was a controversial draw with Tua being knocked down for the first time in his professional career late in the 12th round.

Tua fought Demetrice King on 19 March 2011. Tua defeated King by unanimous decision with the scores of 100–91, 100–91, and 100–90.

Tua's rematch against Monte Barrett on 13 August 2011 resulted in a unanimous points decision going in favour of Barrett. The judges scored the bout 113–112, 115–112, and 115–112.

In December 2011, it emerged that Monte Barrett tested positive for banned stimulant methylhexanamine following a urine test after his 13 August points decision over Tua. Tua's lawyer, Blair Edwards, called for action against the 40-year-old New Yorker requesting the return of Tua's WBO Asia-Pacific and Oriental titles and the restoration of ranking points.

=== 2013 comeback and retirement ===
In June 2013 it was confirmed that Tua was once again getting back into the ring. Belarusian Alexander Ustinov defeated him by unanimous points decision, following which he announced his retirement from professional boxing. Ringside Report were mixed in their evaluation of his career, referring to him as "one of the best heavyweights never to win a world title".

== Outside the ring ==
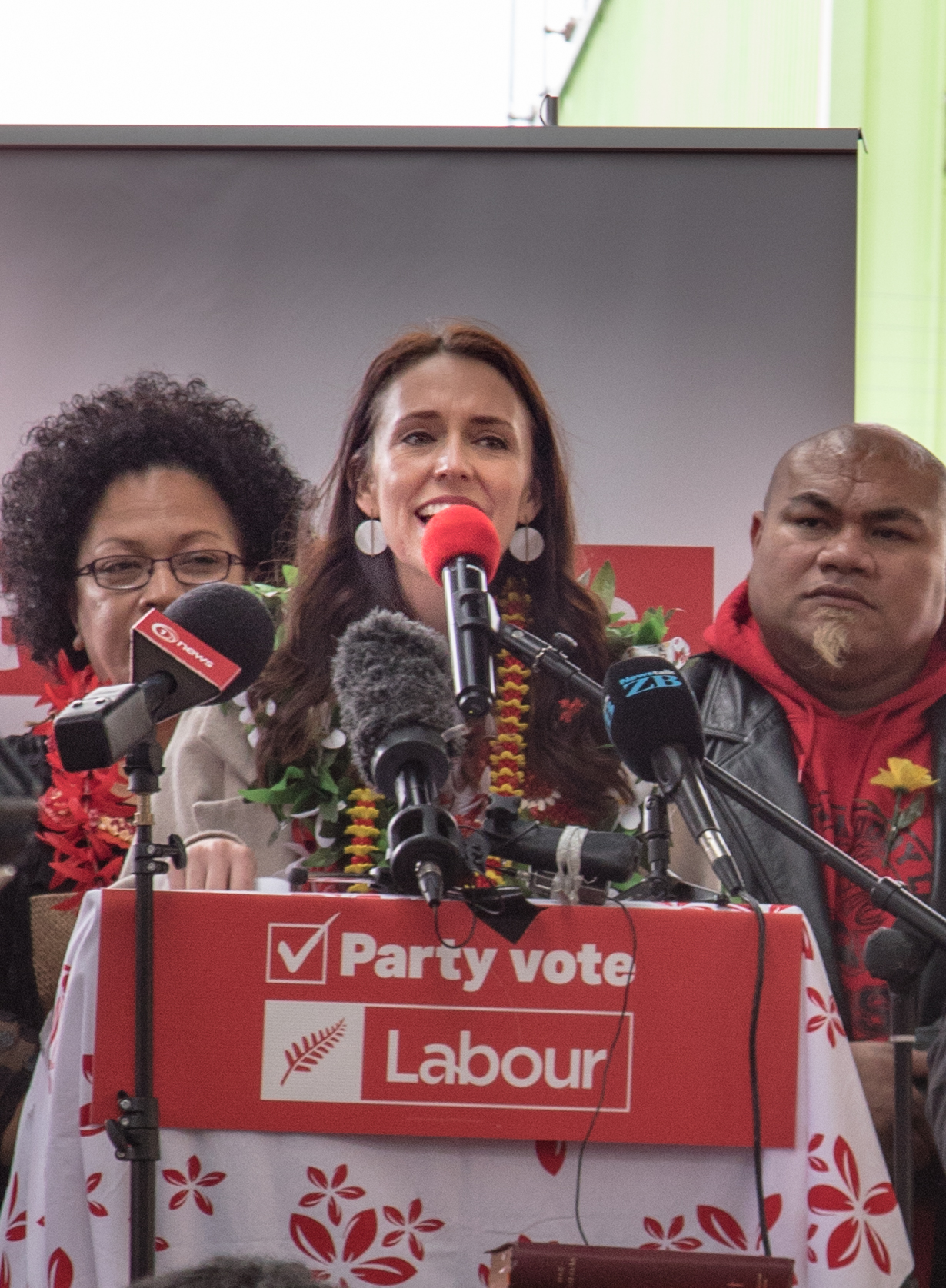
Tua (right) with Prime Minister Jacinda Ardern at a political rally, 2017

On 10 October 1992 Tua appeared on the New Zealand version of the game show Wheel of Fortune. He had asked for an "O for Olsen" (possibly a reference to Olsen Filipaina) but this was heard by some (and widely reported) as "O for awesome". He requested "P" when buying a vowel on the same episode. He was also heard to ask if he could buy a "constonant" during the same show.

From 1992 to 2003, Tua was managed by former boxer Kevin Barry, who also trained him from 2001. In 2003 Tua ended his business relationship with Barry and financial manager Martin Pugh. Though Barry accepted his dismissal as trainer, he resisted Tua's decision to end their contract, which still had two years to go. In 2004, Tua's accountant learned that the boxer's finances with his boxing company, Tuaman Inc. Ltd., were tangled with company expenses; Tua no longer had most of his 20 million NZD in purses from his professional matches, and important assets Tua thought he owned alone were anything but, including a piece of coastal land at Pākiri. Tuaman Inc. Ltd had business expenses flowing in various directions, involving companies and clients Tua had no knowledge of. Tua's own home was purchased with borrowed money, and the boxer's purses were linked to renovation costs for Martin Pugh's property. These findings were based on documents from Pugh's offices.

In 2005 Tua took Kevin Barry and Martin Pugh to court over their business arrangements. Barry and Pugh accused Tua of manipulating them to collect revenue, yet Tua maintained that he knew little of the men's affairs and did what they told him to do out of trust. The dispute gave both sides legal victories: over the issue of the coastal land property, the court ruled in favour of Barry and Pugh, since Tua failed to properly clarify his ownership over the land; on the issue of the terminated 2003 contract, the court ruled in Tua's favour, concluding he clearly owed no expenses to his former management from that contract. In October 2009, it was reported in The New Zealand Herald that the parties had settled all previously unresolved matters arising from the protracted litigation.

In May 2007, Cedric Kushner, president of Gotham Boxing Inc. and Tua's promoter, filed a $5 million lawsuit against IBF heavyweight champion Wladimir Klitschko and promoter Shelly Finkel among others – and while the lawsuit is unrelated to Tua, Kushner has stated he will drop the lawsuit if Tua is given a title bout against Klitschko in 2008, which ultimately failed to materialize.

In September 2009, Tua's aunt was killed in the Samoa tsunami. In early October he travelled to Samoa with cousin Va'aiga Tuigamala to see how they could help.

Tua cameo'd in the 2019 movie, Take Home Pay, in which he played as himself. He's portrayed as a look-a-like to Bob Titilo, who was played by New Zealand actor and comedian, Tofiga Fepuleaʻi.

In the 2019 Queen's Birthday Honours, Tua was appointed an Officer of the New Zealand Order of Merit, for services to youth, boxing and the community, having previously been appointed a Member of the New Zealand Order of Merit, for services to boxing, in the 2001 New Year Honours.

In 1996, Tua was honoured by the country of Tuvalu, with a stamp commemorating the 1996 Summer Olympic Games in Atlanta, Georgia, United States bearing Tua's likeness and name on it.

== In popular culture ==
- Tua is mentioned in an episode of the animated series Family Guy, when character Stewie draws Tua's likeness on a wall.
- In 2020, he was seen to be in a gathering opposing the legalisation of recreational use of cannabis.

== Professional boxing record ==
59 fights	52 wins	5 losses
By knockout	43	0
By decision	9	5
Draws	2	

No.	Result	Record	Opponent	Type	Round, time	Date	Location	Notes
59	Loss	52–5–2	Alexander Ustinov	UD	12	16 Nov 2013	Claudelands Arena, Hamilton, New Zealand	For vacant WBA Pan African heavyweight title
58	Loss	52–4–2	Monte Barrett	UD	12	13 Aug 2011	TelstraClear Pacific Events Centre, Auckland, New Zealand	Lost WBO Asia Pacific and WBO Oriental heavyweight titles
57	Win	52–3–2	Demetrice King	UD	10	19 Mar 2011	TelstraClear Pacific Events Centre, Auckland, New Zealand	
56	Draw	51–3–2	Monte Barrett	MD	12	17 Jul 2010	Tropicana Casino & Resort, Atlantic City, New Jersey, US	Retained WBO Asia Pacific and WBO Oriental heavyweight titles
55	Win	51–3–1	Friday Ahunanya	UD	12	31 Mar 2010	The Trusts Arena, Auckland, New Zealand	Retained WBO Asia Pacific and WBO Oriental heavyweight titles
54	Win	50–3–1	Shane Cameron	KO	2 (12), 0:20	3 Oct 2009	Mystery Creek Events Centre, Hamilton, New Zealand	Won WBO Asia Pacific and WBO Oriental heavyweight titles.
53	Win	49–3–1	Cerrone Fox	TKO	2 (10), 1:41	7 Sep 2007	Soaring Eagle Casino & Resort, Mount Pleasant, Michigan, US	
52	Win	48–3–1	Saúl Montana	KO	1 (10), 1:15	18 Aug 2007	South Towne Expo Center, Sandy, Utah, US	
51	Win	47–3–1	Robert Hawkins	UD	10	22 Feb 2007	Roseland Ballroom, New York City, New York, US	
50	Win	46–3–1	Maurice Wheeler	KO	7 (10), 2:48	3 Nov 2006	Roseland Ballroom, New York City, New York, US	
49	Win	45–3–1	Edward Gutierrez	KO	4 (10), 2:59	26 Jul 2006	Hammerstein Ballroom, New York City, New York, US	
48	Win	44–3–1	Cisse Salif	SD	10	21 Oct 2005	Hard Rock Live, Hollywood, Florida, US	
47	Win	43–3–1	Talmadge Griffis	TKO	10 (10), 2:34	31 Mar 2005	The Trusts Arena, Auckland, New Zealand	
46	Draw	42–3–1	Hasim Rahman	SD	12	29 Mar 2003	Spectrum, Philadelphia, Pennsylvania, US	
45	Win	42–3	Russell Chasteen	KO	2 (10), 1:41	30 Nov 2002	Etess Arena, Atlantic City, New Jersey, US	
44	Win	41–3	Michael Moorer	KO	1 (10), 0:30	17 Aug 2002	Etess Arena, Atlantic City, New Jersey, US	
43	Win	40–3	Fres Oquendo	TKO	9 (12), 1:54	13 Apr 2002	Mountaineer Casino Racetrack and Resort, New Cumberland, West Virginia, US	Won NABF heavyweight title
42	Win	39–3	Garing Lane	TKO	8 (10), 2:35	19 Dec 2001	Feather Falls Casino, Oroville, California, US	
41	Loss	38–3	Chris Byrd	UD	12	18 Aug 2001	Cox Pavilion, Paradise, Nevada, US	For USBA heavyweight title
40	Win	38–2	Danell Nicholson	KO	6 (12), 0:34	23 Mar 2001	Texas Station, North Las Vegas, Nevada, US	
39	Loss	37–2	Lennox Lewis	UD	12	11 Nov 2000	Mandalay Bay Events Center, Paradise, Nevada, US	For WBC, IBF, and IBO heavyweight titles
38	Win	37–1	Robert Daniels	TKO	3 (12), 0:47	21 Jul 2000	Regent, Las Vegas, Nevada, US	Retained IBF Inter-Continental and USBA heavyweight titles
37	Win	36–1	Obed Sullivan	KO	1 (12), 0:51	3 Jun 2000	MGM Grand Garden Arena, Paradise, Nevada, US	Retained IBF Inter-Continental and USBA heavyweight titles
36	Win	35–1	Shane Sutcliffe	TKO	2 (10), 1:20	23 Oct 1999	MGM Grand Garden Arena, Paradise, Nevada, US	
35	Win	34–1	Gary Bell	TKO	1 (12), 1:19	17 Jul 1999	Caesars Tahoe, Stateline, Nevada, US	Retained USBA heavyweight title
34	Win	33–1	Hasim Rahman	TKO	10 (12), 0:35	19 Dec 1998	Miccosukee Resort & Gaming, Miami, Florida, US	Won IBF Inter-Continental and USBA heavyweight titles
33	Win	32–1	Eric Curry	TKO	1 (10), 0:43	26 Sep 1998	Mohegan Sun Arena, Montville, Connecticut, US	
32	Win	31–1	Nate Tubbs	KO	2 (10), 2:12	30 May 1998	Boardwalk Hall, Atlantic City, New Jersey, US	
31	Win	30–1	Cleveland Woods	TKO	3 (10)	18 Apr 1998	Cow Palace, San Francisco, California, US	
30	Win	29–1	Jeff Wooden	MD	10	10 Mar 1998	National Guard Armory, Pikesville, Maryland, US	
29	Win	28–1	Jeff Lally	TKO	2 (10), 1:04	22 Nov 1997	Etess Arena, Atlantic City, New Jersey, US	
28	Loss	27–1	Ike Ibeabuchi	UD	12	7 Jun 1997	ARCO Arena, Sacramento, California, US	Lost WBC International heavyweight title
27	Win	27–0	Oleg Maskaev	TKO	11 (12), 1:16	5 Apr 1997	Bally's Park Place, Atlantic City, New Jersey, US	Retained WBC International heavyweight title
26	Win	26–0	David Izon	TKO	12 (12), 1:54	21 Dec 1996	Mohegan Sun Arena, Montville, Connecticut, US	Retained WBC International heavyweight title
25	Win	25–0	Darroll Wilson	KO	1 (12), 3:10	20 Sep 1996	James L. Knight International Center, Miami, Florida, US	Retained WBC International heavyweight title
24	Win	24–0	Anthony Cooks	TKO	1 (10), 2:24	21 Jul 1996	Teamsters Hall, Baltimore, Maryland, US	
23	Win	23–0	John Ruiz	KO	1 (12), 0:19	15 Mar 1996	Convention Hall, Atlantic City, New Jersey, US	Won WBC International heavyweight title
22	Win	22–0	Bruce Bellocchi	TKO	2 (10), 2:39	13 Jan 1996	Bally's Park Place, Atlantic City, New Jersey, US	
21	Win	21–0	Mauricio Villegas	TKO	6 (10), 2:51	26 Aug 1995	Convention Hall, Atlantic City, New Jersey, US	
20	Win	20–0	Sean Hart	UD	8	15 Jul 1995	Caesars Tahoe, Stateline, Nevada, US	
19	Win	19–0	Dan Murphy	TKO	5 (10), 0:35	20 May 1995	Convention Hall, Atlantic City, New Jersey, US	
18	Win	18–0	Bruce Bellocchi	TKO	1 (10), 3:00	4 Mar 1995	Convention Hall, Atlantic City, New Jersey, US	
17	Win	17–0	Cecil Coffee	KO	1 (10), 0:29	9 Dec 1994	ASB Stadium, Auckland, New Zealand	
16	Win	16–0	Ken Lakusta	KO	4 (10)	1 Oct 1994	Scope, Norfolk, Virginia, US	
15	Win	15–0	Everton Davis	UD	10	13 Aug 1994	The Aladdin, Paradise, Nevada, US	
14	Win	14–0	Lester Jackson	UD	8	7 May 1994	Broadway by the Bay Theater, Atlantic City, New Jersey, US	
13	Win	13–0	Calvin Jones	TKO	4 (8)	16 Apr 1994	Caesars Palace, Paradise, Nevada, US	
12	Win	12–0	Bill Corrigan	KO	2 (8), 1:17	5 Feb 1994	The Aladdin, Paradise, Nevada, US	
11	Win	11–0	Mike Acey	KO	1 (10), 0:56	26 Nov 1993	ASB Stadium, Auckland, New Zealand	
10	Win	10–0	Krishna Wainwright	UD	6	6 Nov 1993	Caesars Palace, Paradise, Nevada, US	
9	Win	9–0	Rick Honeycutt	KO	2 (6), 2:12	25 Sep 1993	Mid-Hudson Civic Center, Poughkeepsie, New York, US	
8	Win	8–0	Larry Davis	KO	1 (6), 2:18	10 Jul 1993	Fernwood Resort, Bushkill, Pennsylvania, US	
7	Win	7–0	Bruce Johnson	TKO	2 (6), 0:44	22 Jun 1993	Etess Arena, Atlantic City, New Jersey, US	
6	Win	6–0	Willie Washington	KO	1 (6)	28 May 1993	Houston, Texas, US	
5	Win	5–0	Alfredo Nevarez	TKO	1 (6), 2:35	23 Mar 1993	HemisFair Arena, San Antonio, Texas, US	
4	Win	4–0	Howard Kelly	TKO	3 (6)	27 Feb 1993	Showboat Hotel Casino and Bowling Center, Atlantic City, New Jersey, US	
3	Win	3–0	Lazaro Almanza	TKO	3 (6)	6 Feb 1993	Madison Square Garden, New York City, New York, US	
2	Win	2–0	Lorenzo Poole	KO	1 (6), 1:08	14 Dec 1992	Foxwoods Resort Casino, Ledyard, Connecticut, US	
1	Win	1–0	Ron Humes	KO	1 (4), 0:37	1 Dec 1992	Convention Center, Virginia Beach, Virginia, US	

== Awards and recognitions ==
- 2024 Auckland Boxing Association Hall of Fame
- 2023 Atlantic City Boxing Hall of Fame
- 2022 Florida Boxing Hall of Fame
- 2020 US National Boxing Hall of Fame
- 2020 NZ Boxing Hall of Fame
- 2019 Gladrap Boxing Hall of fame
- 2019 Officer of the New Zealand Order of Merit
- 1992 Olympics (Barcelona, Spain) - Bronze Medal (Heavyweight)

Sporting positions
Regional boxing titles
Preceded by John Ruiz	WBC International heavyweight champion 15 March 1996 – 7 June 1997	Succeeded by Ike Ibeabuchi
Preceded by Hasim Rahman	IBF Inter-Continental heavyweight champion 19 December 1998 – 11 November 2000; Failed to win world title	Vacant Title next held by Timo Hoffmann
Preceded by Hasim Rahman	USBA heavyweight champion 19 December 1998 – November 2000; Vacated	Vacant Title next held by Chris Byrd
Preceded by Fres Oquendo	NABF heavyweight champion 13 April 2002 – August 2002; Vacated	Vacant Title next held by Elieser Castillo
Preceded by Shane Cameron	WBO Asia Pacific heavyweight champion 3 October 2009 – 13 August 2011	Succeeded by Monte Barrett
Preceded by Shane Cameron	WBO Oriental heavyweight champion 3 October 2009 – 13 August 2011	Succeeded by Monte Barrett
