= Roy Jones Jr. vs. Mike McCallum =

Boxing competition

Fire on Ice
- Date: November 22, 1996
- Venue: Ice Palace, Tampa, Florida, U.S.
- Title(s) on the line: WBC interim light heavyweight title

Tale of the tape
Boxer	Roy Jones Jr.	Mike McCallum
Nickname	Junior	The Body Snatcher
Hometown	Pensacola, Florida, U.S.	Kingston, Jamaica
Purse	$2,800,000	$750,000
Pre-fight record	33–0 (29 KO)	49–3–1 (36 KO)
Age	27 years, 10 months	39 years, 11 months
Height	5 ft 11 in (180 cm)	5 ft 11 1/2 in (182 cm)
Weight	173 lb (78 kg)	175 lb (79 kg)
Style	Orthodox	Orthodox
Recognition	IBF; Super Middleweight Champion; The Ring; No. 1 Ranked Super Middleweight; The Ring No. 1 ranked pound-for-pound fighter 2-division world champion	WBC; No. 1 Ranked Light Heavyweight; The Ring; No. 7 Ranked Light Heavyweight; 3-division world champion

Result
- Jones Jr. wins via 12-round unanimous decision (120-107, 120-107, 120-107)

Roy Jones Jr. vs. Mike McCallum, billed as Fire on Ice, was a professional boxing match contested on November 22, 1996 for the interim WBC light heavyweight championship. It was Jones' first fight in the light heavyweight division.

== Background ==
As the current WBC light heavyweight champion Fabrice Tiozzo decided whether to remain a light heavyweight or move up to the cruiserweight division, the WBC organized a match for the interim WBC light heavyweight title between 39–year old number-one contender, Mike McCallum (whom Tiozzo had defeated for the title) and the reigning IBF super middleweight champion Roy Jones Jr., who was making his light heavyweight debut and was also regarded by The Ring as the number one pound-for-pound fighter in boxing. The future hall-of-famer McCallum was the underdog for one of the only times in his professional career and McCallum himself admitted that he "have to utilize everything I have if I'm going to win."

Prior to the fight, controversy arose when the WBC and the Florida State Athletic Commission feuded over whose officials would judge the fight. Neither side budged and, ultimately, two sets of judge's, one from each organization, would score the fight. The official judges were from the FSAC, however the WBC judges would score the fight from the first row of the media section and WBC president José Sulaimán made it known that the organization would go by their judges scorecards, regardless if the FSAC judges ruled in favor of a different fighter then the WBC judges.

== The fight ==
Jones was not as aggressive as he had been in some of his past fights, choosing to fight McCallum cautiously for the most part. McCallum, though, had difficulty with the younger and quicker Jones and despite throwing 651 punches, 116 more than Jones, he connected with only 209 for a 32% success rate. Jones, meanwhile, landed nearly half of his thrown punches, connecting with 254 of 535 punches for a 47% success rate. Jones also scored the lone knockdown in the fight. Just before the end of the tenth round, Jones connected with a right to McCallum's jaw that put him down on the seat of his pants, however McCallum was able to quickly get back to his feet. The bout went the full 12 rounds and as a result went to the judge's scorecards. The official FSAC judges had Jones winning all 12 rounds and scored the bout 120–107. The WBC judges were also unanimously in favor of Jones, albeit with three different scores of 119–108, 117–110 and 116–111.

== Aftermath ==
Shortly after his victory, Jones "interim" tag was removed and he was upgraded to full championship status as Tiozzo officially vacated his light heavyweight title and moved to the cruiserweight division. Jones' first light heavyweight title reign would not last long. In his next fight on March 21, 1997, Jones was disqualified after hitting his opponent Montell Griffin as he was down on one knee, becoming Jones' first loss as a professional. Jones, however, would knock out Griffin in a rematch later in the year and held the WBC light heavyweight title (eventually unifying it with the WBA and IBF versions along the way) until 2003 when he moved up to the heavyweight division.

The bout would prove to be the final title fight of McCallum's career. After his loss to Jones, he would fight only one more time, losing by unanimous decision to James Toney in the third fight of their trilogy before announcing his retirement with a 49–5–1 record.

== Undercard ==
Confirmed bouts:

- WBO Super Bantamweight Championship bout: (Mexico) Marco Antonio Barrera vs. (United States) Junior Jones

Jones defeated Barrera by disqualification in round five to win WBO Super Bantamweight title

- Heavyweight bout: (United States) Al Cole vs. (United States) Matthew Charleston

Cole defeated Charleston by knockout in round one

== Broadcasting ==
Country	Broadcaster
United Kingdom	British Eurosport
United States	HBO

Preceded by vs. Bryant Brannon	Roy Jones Jr.'s bouts 22 November 1996	Succeeded by vs. Montell Griffin
Preceded by vs. Ali Saidi	Mike McCallum's bouts 22 November 1996	Succeeded by vs. James Toney III
