= Ike Ibeabuchi =

Nigerian boxer (born 1973)

Personal information
- Nickname: "The President"
- Born: Ikemefula Charles Ibeabuchi; February 2, 1973 (age 53) Isuochi, Nigeria
- Height: 6 ft 2 in (188 cm)
- Weight: Heavyweight

Boxing career
- Reach: 76 in (193 cm)
- Stance: Orthodox

Boxing record
- Total fights: 22
- Wins: 21
- Win by KO: 16
- Losses: 1

Ikemefula Charles "Ike" Ibeabuchi // (born February 2, 1973) is a Nigerian professional boxer. He holds a notable win over future world heavyweight champion Chris Byrd.

He was ranked by BoxRec as the world's No.8 heavyweight in 1997 and 1998, and as No.10 heavyweight in 1999.

== Amateur career ==
Ike planned on joining the Nigerian military before he witnessed Buster Douglas knock out Mike Tyson in 1990. Inspired by the fight, Ike started boxing as an amateur. Ike twice defeated countryman and eventual 1996 Olympic Bronze medalist Duncan Dokiwari. Ibeabuchi emigrated to the United States and moved to the Dallas area with his mother in 1993. Ibeabuchi won the Dallas and Texas State Golden Gloves tournaments at heavyweight in 1994.

== Professional career ==
Under the guidance of former world welterweight champion Curtis Cokes, Ike made his professional debut at heavyweight with a second-round knockout of Ismael Garcia on October 13, 1994.

=== Rise up the ranks ===
==== Ibeabuchi vs. Tua ====
After winning 16 straight fights from the start of his career, Ike made a big jump in competition and fought undefeated prospect David Tua for the WBC International Heavyweight title on June 7, 1997. Tua was 27-0 and considered by many analysts to be 'the next Mike Tyson'.

Both boxers threw bombs and neither took a backward step all night. Ibeabuchi and Tua set a CompuStat heavyweight division record with 1,730 punches thrown. Ike also set the individual CompuStat record by throwing 975 punches and averaging 81 per round. The heavyweight average is around 50. Ibeabuchi won a unanimous 12-round decision over Tua with scores of 117–111, 116–113, and 115–114. The fight established Ibeabuchi as the top contender for the world heavyweight title.

=== Return to the ring ===
Ibeabuchi returned to the ring after 13 months of inactivity, scoring a first-round knockout over Tim Ray in July 1998. Two months later, he stopped Everton Davis in nine rounds.

==== Ibeabuchi vs. Byrd ====
Ibeabuchi's next fight was against Chris Byrd in March 1999. Byrd, a 1992 Olympic silver medalist and a future world heavyweight champion, was a quick and slick southpaw with a record of 26–0.

After four rounds, the three judges had the fight scored evenly: 38–38 even, 39-37 for Ibeabuchi, and 39–37 for Byrd. In the fifth round, Ibeabuchi landed a devastating left uppercut which sent Byrd to the canvas. Byrd made it back to his feet, but he was quickly knocked back down. Byrd once again rose, but he was trapped against the ropes and was taking punishment as the referee waved it off at the 2:59 mark.

Following the win over Byrd, Ibeabuchi turned down $700,000 to fight fringe contender Jeremy Williams, and he also turned down $1 million for a showdown with the undefeated Michael Grant.

=== Comeback ===
As of 2024, Ibeabuchi had begun working with Ben Wilson from Glossop, UK, to organize and promote a successful return to the ring, focusing on overcoming legal and logistical challenges. Several recent videos show Ibeabuchi training, sharing his journey, discussing future opportunities with Ben and generating renewed interest in his comeback. Plans were in motion for Ibeabuchi to participate in a scheduled fight in December 2024 against journeyman Ayman Farouk Abbas on the undercard of a WBF world title bout in Port Harcourt, finally marking a significant step in his return to professional boxing. However, his return fight against Abbas was rescheduled to February 2025 due to disputes between promoters and organisers. Ultimately, this bout never occurred. At 52 years old, and not having fought since 1999, Ibeabuchi fought 40 year old Idris Afinni on August 23, 2025 in Lagos, Nigeria. He won via retirement in round 3.

Ibeabuchi suffered the first defeat of his career when he lost via unanimous decision to Kabiru Towolawi over 12 rounds at Teslim Balogun Stadium in Lagos, Nigeria, on 24 December 2025.

== Legal issues ==
A couple of months after the Tua fight, Ibeabuchi abducted the 15-year-old son of his former girlfriend and slammed his car into a concrete pillar on Interstate 35 north of Austin, Texas. According to the criminal complaint, the boy suffered 'numerous injuries' from the accident 'and will never walk normally again'. The courts concluded Ibeabuchi was trying to commit suicide, and he was sentenced to 120 days in jail after pleading guilty to false imprisonment. Ibeabuchi also paid a $500,000 civil settlement.

Ibeabuchi developed a new persona based on his nickname, 'The President'. At times when he was being churlish or refusing to complete a simple requirement such as attending a weigh-in, his handlers would appeal to The President's regal nature by convincing him it was the noble thing to do. "There were times when he thought he was really a president", boxing promoter and former HBO Sports executive Lou DiBella said. "He would get into these mental states where he insisted on people calling him 'The President'. It was his alter ego, where 'I am The President,' not of the United States, but maybe president of the world."

Once, Ibeabuchi wielded a knife during a dinner meeting in New York to discuss a possible three fight HBO deal. "We were having a fine meal at a nice restaurant", Promoter Cedric Kushner said, "and mid-course Ike picked up a big carving knife, slammed it into the table and screamed 'They knew it! They knew it! The belts belong to me! Why don't they just give them back?'" "That was a peculiar experience", Kushner said. "That wasn't the type of conduct I expected to romance the guy from HBO. He (Ibeabuchi) was like a Viking."

=== Imprisonment ===
In July 1999, Ibeabuchi was staying at The Mirage Hotel and Casino in Las Vegas when he phoned a local escort service and had a woman sent to his room. The 21-year-old woman said later she was there to strip and nothing else. She claimed Ibeabuchi attacked her in the walk-in closet after she demanded to be paid up front. Ibeabuchi barricaded himself in the bathroom and police discharged pepper spray under the door until he surrendered.

Ibeabuchi's legal defense faced the further difficulty of the Clark County DA's reopening of a similar sexual assault allegation against him from eight months earlier which took place at Treasure Island Hotel and Casino. Ibeabuchi was released on bail and placed under house arrest, able to train and fight again until his trial. He was remanded after two more similar allegations surfaced from Arizona.

Ibeabuchi was deemed incompetent to stand trial and was sent to a state facility. Medical experts concluded he exhibited bipolar disorder and a judge granted permission to force-medicate him. Eight months later, two and a half years after his arrest, he was ruled cogent enough to plea.

Ibeabuchi subsequently entered an Alford plea, pleading guilty while not admitting guilt to avoid going to trial. Ibeabuchi was sentenced to two to ten years for battery with intent to commit a crime (from which he was later paroled), and three to 20 years for attempted sexual assault, with the sentences to be served consecutively.

While incarcerated, Ibeabuchi earned three college associate degrees from Western Nevada Community College, in General Studies, Business, and Management. He also earned a paralegal certificate by correspondence from Blackstone Career Institute in Allentown, Pennsylvania. His Las Vegas conviction was overturned by the Nevada Supreme Court in 2007 and he expected to be released, but the lower courts abandoned the ruling. The Nevada Supreme Court subsequently affirmed its earlier ruling of its overturning of Ibeabuchi's Las Vegas conviction again, and Ibeabuchi's Nevada conviction was eventually overturned, vacated, and discharged.

=== Release, rearrest, and rerelease ===
Ibeabuchi completed his sentence in the Nevada Department of Corrections. Prior to this, Ibeabuchi was moved to the Washoe County Jail on February 28, 2014, and then he was transferred by United States Immigration and Customs Enforcement (ICE) to the Eloy Detention Center in Eloy, Arizona.

Ibeabuchi was released by USCIS in November 2015 as a free man when Nigeria declined to provide travel documents. Ibeabuchi enlisted the help of Mike Koncz, an adviser of Manny Pacquiao, in an attempt to make a boxing comeback. In good health, Ibeabuchi hoped to fight his first comeback bout in the near future, but he was waiting to resolve his immigration and United States citizenship status with USCIS first. He holds a green card and his citizenship was pending only the formal swearing in. However, in April 2016, Ibeabuchi was arrested for violating the conditions of his probation in Gilbert, Arizona, based on an old warrant dating back to 2003 that he claimed to be unaware of.

Ibeabuchi was released on September 23, 2020, from the Arizona State penal system after serving required time, and his probationary status was overturned on appeal. That month, an Immigration Judge issued an order addressing Ike Ibeabuchi’s "New Arrival" status with Nigeria Immigration Services, as directed by the U.S. Department of Homeland Security. He was held at the United States Immigration, Customs and Enforcement (ICE) in Eloy, Arizona, during the COVID-19 pandemic before his swearing in ceremony and the formal awarding of U.S. citizenship could be scheduled, either while in detainee custody or after final release.

== Professional boxing record ==
22 fights	21 wins	1 loss
By knockout	16	0
By decision	5	1

No.	Result	Record	Opponent	Type	Round, time	Date	Location	Notes
22	Loss	21–1	Kabiru Towolawi	UD	12	24 Dec 2025	Teslim Balogun Stadium, Lagos, Nigeria	
21	Win	21–0	Idris Afinni	RTD	3 (12), 3:00	23 Aug 2025	Teslim Balogun Stadium, Lagos, Nigeria	
20	Win	20–0	Chris Byrd	TKO	5 (10), 2:59	20 Mar 1999	Emerald Queen Casino, Tacoma, Washington, U.S.	
19	Win	19–0	Everton Davis	TKO	9 (10), 2:34	4 Sep 1998	Etess Arena, Atlantic City, New Jersey, U.S.	
18	Win	18–0	Tim Ray	TKO	1 (8), 2:33	9 Jul 1998	Grand Casino Avoyelles, Marksville, Louisiana, U.S.	
17	Win	17–0	David Tua	UD	12	7 Jun 1997	ARCO Arena, Sacramento, California, U.S.	Won WBC International heavyweight title
16	Win	16–0	Marcos Gonzalez	KO	4 (8), 0:25	8 May 1997	Wyndham Anatole, Dallas, Texas, U.S.	
15	Win	15–0	Marion Wilson	UD	10	6 Mar 1997	Convention Hall, Asbury Park, New Jersey, U.S.	
14	Win	14–0	Calvin Jones	TKO	2 (10), 2:39	9 Jan 1997	Wilshire Hotel, Beverly Hills, California, U.S.	
13	Win	13–0	Rodney Blount	KO	3	5 Dec 1996	Brady Theater, Tulsa, Oklahoma, U.S.	
12	Win	12–0	Anthony Wade	PTS	8	8 Nov 1996	Arizona Charlie's Decatur, Las Vegas, Nevada, U.S.	
11	Win	11–0	Herman Delgado	TKO	4 (8), 2:59	8 Aug 1996	Civic Center, Lake Charles, Louisiana, U.S.	
10	Win	10–0	Mike Acklie	TKO	1 (8), 1:12	24 May 1996	Dallas, Texas, U.S.	
9	Win	9–0	Gary Butler	KO	1 (8), 0:53	11 Apr 1996	Dallas, Texas, U.S.	
8	Win	8–0	Calvin Lampkin	KO	2, 0:35	2 Nov 1995	Music Hall, Austin, Texas, U.S.	
7	Win	7–0	Greg Pickrom	TKO	3 (6), 2:59	9 Sep 1995	Fort Worth, Texas, U.S.	
6	Win	6–0	Terry Porter	RTD	3	25 Aug 1995	Music Hall, Austin, Texas, U.S.	
5	Win	5–0	Martin Lopez	KO	1	20 Jun 1995	Fort Worth, Texas, U.S.	
4	Win	4–0	Keith Walton	UD	6	10 Mar 1995	Fort Worth, Texas, U.S.	
3	Win	3–0	Ron McGowan	KO	3	26 Jan 1995	Shreveport, Louisiana, U.S.	
2	Win	2–0	Calvin Lampkin	UD	4	2 Dec 1994	Fort Worth, Texas, U.S.	
1	Win	1–0	Ismael Garcia	KO	2	13 Oct 1994	Shreveport, Louisiana, U.S.	

Sporting positions
Regional boxing titles
Preceded by David Tua	WBC International heavyweight champion June 7, 1997 – February 1998; Vacated	Vacant Title next held by Wladimir Klitschko
