= Lou Del Valle =

American boxer

Personal information
- Nickname: Honey Boy
- Nationality: American
- Born: Louis Del Valle; July 13, 1968 (age 58) Long Island City, New York, U.S.
- Height: 6 ft 0 in (183 cm)
- Weight: Light heavyweight; Cruiserweight

Boxing career
- Reach: 74 in (188 cm)
- Stance: Southpaw

Boxing record
- Total fights: 44
- Wins: 36
- Win by KO: 22
- Losses: 6
- Draws: 2

Louis Del Valle (born July 13, 1968, in Long Island City, New York) is an American boxer and the former WBA light heavyweight title holder. He is currently the boxing trainer of former cruiserweight champion, Badou Jack.

== Professional career ==
Known as "Honey Boy", Del Valle turned pro in 1992 and won his first 22 bouts, setting up a shot at long-time WBA light heavyweight champion Virgil Hill in 1996. Hill won a close unanimous decision. In 1997 he took on Eddy Smulders for the vacant WBA light heavyweight title and won via 8th-round TKO. He lost the belt in his next fight, a clear decision loss to Roy Jones Jr. in a WBC/WBA unification bout, but became the first fighter ever to knock Jones down.

In 2001 he took on Bruno Girard for vacant WBA light heavyweight title, but came up short of the title in a draw. In 2002 he rematched Girard for the same belt, but lost a split decision.

De Leon Tinsley (9-3-1), on July 18, 2008, won a unanimous decision over Del Valle (36-6-1), 40, in the 8-round bout at Mahi Temple Auditorium. Judges Stu Winston and Fred Flutie scored the bout for Tinsley as did Bill Ray (77-75). Tinsley weighed 189 pounds while Del Valle came in at 198.

== Professional boxing record ==
44 fights	36 wins	6 losses
By knockout	22	0
By decision	14	6
Draws	2	

No.	Result	Record	Opponent	Type	Round, time	Date	Location	Notes
44	Draw	36–6–2	(United States) Joey Spina	MD	10	31/10/2009	(United States) Mohegan Sun Arena, Uncasville	97-93, 95-95, 95-95.
43	Loss	36–6–1	(United States) DeLeon Tinsley	UD	8	18/07/2008	(United States) Mahi Temple Shrine Auditorium, Miami	74-78, 75-77, 75-77.
42	Win	36–5–1	(United States) Newton Kidd	SD	8	31/01/2008	(United States) Utopia Paradise Theatre, Bronx	78-74, 77-75, 74-78.
41	Loss	35–5–1	(Denmark) Johny Jensen	UD	12	14/09/2007	(Denmark) Forum, Horsens	WBA Intercontinental Cruiserweight Title. 113-116, 110-117, 110-117.
40	Loss	35–4–1	(United States) Zack Page	UD	10	20/10/2006	(United States) Chevrolet Centre, Youngstown	92-98, 93-97, 93-97.
39	Win	35–3–1	(United States) Danny Sheehan	UD	8	02/04/2005	(United States) DCU Center, Worcester	79-73, 78-74, 78-74.
38	Win	34–3–1	(United States) Raymond McLamore	SD	8	02/12/2004	(United States) The Plex, North Charleston	
37	Win	33–3–1	(United States) James Johnson	UD	6	16/10/2004	(United States) Club Ovation, Boynton Beach	60-54, 60-54, 60-54.
36	Win	32–3–1	(United States) Tiwon Taylor	TKO	5	17/04/2004	(United States) Madison Square Garden, New York	79-73, 78-74, 78-74.
35	Loss	31–3–1	(France) Bruno Girard	SD	12	13/07/2002	(France) Palavas-les-Flots	WBA World Light Heavyweight Title. 113-116, 111-116, 115-113.
34	Draw	31–2–1	(France) Bruno Girard	PTS	12	04/08/2001	(France) Plage du Prado, Marseille	WBA World Light Heavyweight Title. 113-116, 115-114, 115-115.
33	Win	31–2	(United States) Dennis McKinney	UD	8	17/05/2001	(United States) Roseland Ballroom, New York	
32	Win	30–2	(United States) Earl Butler	KO	3	17/01/2001	(United States) Yonkers Raceway & Empire City Casino, Yonkers	
31	Win	29–2	(United States) Charles Daughtry	TKO	6	29/07/1999	(United States) Roxy Theater, Atlanta	
30	Win	28–2	(United States) Tyrone Armstead	UD	8	22/09/1998	(United States) Madison Square Garden, New York	79-72, 79-72, 77-74.
29	Loss	27–2	(United States) Roy Jones Jr.	UD	12	18/07/1998	(United States) Madison Square Garden, New York	WBC/WBA World Light Heavyweight Title. 109-118, 109-119, 109-118.
28	Win	27–1	(Netherlands) Eddy Smulders	TKO	8	20/09/1997	(Germany) Tivoli Eissporthalle, Aachen	WBA World Light Heavyweight Title.
27	Win	26–1	(Venezuela) Fermin Chirino	TKO	2	13/06/1997	(Germany) Arena Oberhausen, Oberhausen	Referee stopped the bout at 1:40 of the second round.
26	Win	25–1	(United States) Kenny Payne	TKO	3	01/05/1997	(United States) Convention Center, Asbury Park	Referee stopped the bout at 3:00 of the third round.
25	Win	24–1	(United States) Thomas Reid	UD	10	29/10/1996	(United States) Grand Casino, Tunica	
24	Win	23–1	(United States) Ken McCurdy	TKO	2	16/08/1996	(United States) Yonkers Raceway & Empire City Casino, Yonkers	
23	Loss	22–1	(United States) Virgil Hill	UD	12	20/04/1996	(United States) Ralph Engelstad Arena, Grand Forks	WBA World Light Heavyweight Title. 113-114, 112-116, 114-116.
22	Win	22–0	(United States) Ken Wallace	TKO	5	01/12/1995	(United States) Lost Battalion Hall, Queens	Referee stopped the bout at 2:01 of the fifth round.
21	Win	21–0	(Germany) Ali Saidi	UD	8	27/05/1995	(Germany) Arena Westfalenhalle, Dortmund	
20	Win	20–0	(United States) Michael Green	KO	5	03/05/1995	(United States) Lexington Avenue Armory, New York	Green knocked out at 2:34 of the fifth round.
19	Win	19–0	(United States) Charles Daughtry	KO	1	18/03/1995	(United States) Civic Center, Pensacola	Daughtry knocked out at 2:44 of the first round.
18	Win	18–0	(United States) John Lampre	TKO	2	20/01/1995	(United States) Foxboro Raceway, Boston	Referee stopped the bout at 0:56 of the second round.
17	Win	17–0	(Trinidad and Tobago) Anthony Brown	KO	1	13/10/1994	(United States) Huntington Hilton Hotel, Melville	Brown knocked out at 2:31 of the first round.
16	Win	16–0	(United States) Earl Talley	KO	2	07/10/1994	(United States) Westchester County Center, White Plains	Talley knocked out at 1:17 of the second round.
15	Win	15–0	(United States) Tim St Clair	TKO	4	29/04/1994	(United States) Holiday Inn Crowne Plaza, White Plains	Referee stopped the bout at 2:30 of the fourth round.
14	Win	14–0	(United States) Tim St Clair	UD	10	12/11/1993	(United States) Hotel Pennsylvania, New York	New York Light Heavyweight Title.
13	Win	13–0	(United States) James Mullins	TKO	5	04/09/1993	(United States) Forest City	
12	Win	12–0	(United States) Richard Carter	TKO	3	17/06/1993	(United States) White Plains	Referee stopped the bout at 2:42 of the third round.
11	Win	11–0	(Canada) Daren Zenner	UD	6	06/03/1993	(United States) Madison Square Garden, New York	58-55, 58-55, 58-55.
10	Win	10–0	(United States) Jamal Arbubakar	UD	6	27/01/1993	(United States) Paramount Theatre, New York	
9	Win	9–0	(United States) James Campbell	KO	1	23/12/1992	(United States) Westchester County Center, White Plains	Campbell knocked out at 0:33 of the first round.
8	Win	8–0	(United States) Patrick Frazier	UD	6	20/11/1992	(United States) Ramada Hotel, New York	
7	Win	7–0	(United States) Exum Speight	TKO	1	15/10/1992	(United States) Paramount Theatre, New York	Referee stopped the bout at 2:34 of the first round.
6	Win	6–0	(United States) Anthony Sutton	TKO	2	15/09/1992	(United States) Westchester County Center, White Plains	
5	Win	5–0	(United States) Amahl Bacon	TKO	1	25/08/1992	(United States) Harrah's Marina Hotel Casino, Atlantic City	Referee stopped the bout at 1:10 of the first round.
4	Win	4–0	(Uganda) Lihande Patrick	TKO	2	21/05/1992	(United States) Paramount Theatre, New York	Referee stopped the bout at 1:17 of the second round.
3	Win	3–0	(United States) Norman Bell	UD	4	23/03/1992	(United States) Harrah's Marina Hotel Casino, Atlantic City	
2	Win	2–0	(United States) Fred Rivero	TKO	1	07/02/1992	(United States) Ramada Hotel, New York	Referee stopped the bout at 1:18 of the first round.
1	Win	1–0	(United States) Worthy Hendricks	UD	4	12/01/1992	(United States) Harrah's Marina Hotel Casino, Atlantic City	

== See also ==
- List of world light-heavyweight boxing champions
- List of Puerto Rican boxing world champions

Sporting positions
Regional boxing titles
Vacant Title last held by Bobby Cassidy	New York State Light Heavyweight champion November 12, 1993 – 1995; Vacated	Vacant Title next held by David Telesco
World boxing titles
Vacant Title last held by Dariusz Michalczewski	WBA light heavyweight champion September 20, 1997 - July 18, 1998	Succeeded by Roy Jones Jr.
