= David Haye vs. Enzo Maccarinelli =

Boxing match

Bombs Away
- Date: 8 March 2008
- Venue: The O2 Arena, Greenwich, London, UK
- Title(s) on the line: WBA, WBC, WBO and The Ring cruiserweight titles

Tale of the tape
Boxer	David Haye	Enzo Maccarinelli
Nickname	"The Hayemaker"	"Big Mac"
Hometown	Bermondsey, London, UK	Swansea, Wales, UK
Purse	£600,000	
Pre-fight record	20–1 (19 KO)	28–1 (21 KO)
Age	27 years, 4 months	27 years, 6 months
Height	6 ft 3 in (191 cm)	6 ft 4 in (193 cm)
Weight	198 lb (90 kg)	197 lb (89 kg)
Style	Orthodox	Orthodox
Recognition	WBA, WBC and The Ring; Cruiserweight Champion	WBO; Cruiserweight Champion; The Ring; No. 5 Ranked Cruiserweight

Result
- Haye defeats Maccarinelli by 2nd round TKO

David Haye vs. Enzo Maccarinelli, billed as Bombs Away, was a professional boxing match contested on 8 March 2008, for the WBA, WBC, WBO and The Ring cruiserweight championship.

== Background ==
After his stoppage victory over Jean-Marc Mormeck in November 2007 to win the WBA, WBC, The Ring and lineal cruiserweight championship, David Haye had planned to move up full time to heavyweight (having had a one off bout against Tomasz Bonin at the weight in April 2007), however promoter Frank Warren had been pushing for him to face his WBO champion Enzo Maccarinelli in an unification bout. After either a heavyweight or catchweight bout was mooted Haye would tell BBC Sport he was "bending over backwards" to make the cruiserweight for the bout, saying "People keep telling me to fight Maccarinelli and I say I'm not a cruiserweight [any more], but it's being said so much that I told my manager Adam Booth to do what he can to make it happen. I've trained every day since I beat Jean-Marc Mormeck to make sure that my weight doesn't go up in the slim chance that the Maccarinelli fight could happen. It's a fight for the fans. It means little to me as I would bowl him over in a couple of rounds." During a stall in the negotiations Haye's promoter Frank Maloney held talks with Top Rank to potentially arrange a bout with former two time heavyweight champion Hasim Rahman for March 2008.

The bout between Haye and Maccarinelli was officially announced in January 2008 and was set for 8 March at The O2 Arena, only about 4 miles from Haye's birthplace of Bermondsey. The match up drew immediate comparison to the Benn Eubank rematch 15 years earlier, with the event's promoter Warren saying "This is the biggest since Benn-Eubank, without a doubt. We've got the two biggest punchers in world boxing facing each other - we're going to see something very special."

During the build up Maccarinelli would describe Haye as "delusional" for suggesting that he had faced the better opposition than Maccarinelli, saying that "I totally disagree with him saying he has mixed in better company than me. All right, he beat Jean-Marc Mormeck and he fought Carl Thompson, who beat him. But there are no other names that stand out on his record apart from Arthur Williams, who was 44 and took the fight at a week's notice. I boxed Bruce Scott in my 15th fight, a two-time world title challenger and a massive puncher. I've boxed Mark Hobson, the British and Commonwealth champion, Wayne Braithwaite, a former WBC champion, Marcelo Dominguez, a former WBC champion.

While Haye entered to the bout as the 4/7 favourite, many backed Maccarinelli to upset him, with bookmaker Paddy Power stating "The fight is yet to capture the imagination of Hatton v Mayweather but punters are clearly leaning towards an Enzo upset at this stage. Both men have a big bang in their gloves but Haye’s chin isn’t quite so rock solid." Former two weight titlist Steve Collins was among those backing Macarinelli to beat Haye.

== The fight ==
The 1st rounds saw both fighters boxing cautiously, although Maccarinelli appeared to briefly hurt Haye with a left hook early on and later on Haye landed an overhand right of his own. The 2nd round saw Maccarinelli land another left that caused a cut to open above Haye's left eye. Haye would respond with a long right to the jaw followed by a left to the ribs that hurt Maccarinelli. He followed up with a fast furry of shot with Maccarinelli trapped it the corner ending with another hard right that sent the Welshman to the canvas. Maccarinelli rose but he appeared very unsteady on his feet prompting referee John Keane to stop the bout.

== Aftermath ==
Speaking after the bout Haye confirmed that he was moving up the heavyweight saying "A lot of people said Enzo could beat me, so this is what had to happen before I moved up to heavyweight and became the undisputed heavyweight champion of the world. There'll be just as many people doubting me as there were doubting me before this fight, saying I'm too small, I've got no chin, no stamina. But I'm 100% certain that I'll achieve more things at heavyweight than I have done at cruiserweight. I'd fight Wladimir Klitschko in my next fight if I could after his pitiful fight against Sultan Ibragimov. That was embarrassing and he wouldn't look forward to fighting someone with my kind of style - powerful, explosive and able to take him out with any shot. I'll work my way up the rankings, I'm not looking at taking shortcuts, and you guys will get a real entertaining ride. I'm not looking at boxing into my 31st year, so I've got two and a half years to get the job done. If the titles get unified, hopefully I'll just have to fight one guy." He would admit that the cut meant forced him to finish the bout quickly saying "Once I realised I was cut I had to take a couple of risks. As soon as I felt the blood, Adam said close the show, so I did."

Maccarinelli would make no excuses for his defeat saying "I made a mistake, simple as. I caught him in the first round with a short left hook but I didn't jump in and do what I should have done and in the second round I put my chin up in the air and he caught me, jumped in and finished me off. I should have taken a knee, but I didn't and he jumped in and showed he's a good finisher. Everyone knew he was a banger and everyone knew it was going to go early and it was a case of who landed first. I landed in the first round and didn't capitalise, he capitalised, end of story and all the best to him." He would also praise Haye admitting "He was a lot faster and a lot sharper than I thought he would be. He does hit hard and he's got all the attributes to go up to heavyweight."

In May 2008 Haye formally vacated the WBC belt, followed by the WBA and WBO belts before making his heavyweight return in November against veteran former world title challenger Monte Barrett. He would also part with promoter Frank Maloney.

Maccarinelli was set to face unbeaten IBO titleholder Johnathon Banks for the now vacant WBO belt in July, then September before being moved to December. However Banks pulled out with an ankle injury, then late replacement Francisco Álvarez failed his pre-fight medical due to high blood pressure, so Maccarinelli fought Matthew Ellis in a 10-round heavyweight bout.

== Undercard ==
Confirmed bouts:

Winner	Loser	Weight division/title belt(s) disputed	Result
(United Kingdom) Kevin Mitchell	(United Kingdom) Carl Johanneson	British and Commonwealth super featherweight titles	9th-round TKO
(United Kingdom) Paul Smith	(United Kingdom) Cello Renda	English middleweight title	6th-round TKO
Non-TV bouts
(United Kingdom) Patrick J Maxwell	(United Kingdom) Anthony Young	Super middleweight (6 rounds)	4th round RTD
(United Kingdom) Vinny Mitchell	(United Kingdom) John Baguley	Featherweight (4 rounds)	Points decision
(United Kingdom) Eddie Corcoran	(United Kingdom) Johnny Greaves	Light welterweight (4 rounds)	Points decision
(United Kingdom) Michael Walsh	(Georgia (country)) Khvicha Papiashvili	Super flyweight (4 rounds)	4th-round TKO
(United Kingdom) Ryan Walsh	(United Kingdom) Robin Deakin	Super bantamweight (4 rounds)	Points decision
(France) Christopher Sebire	(United Kingdom) Billy Smith	Welterweight (4 rounds)	Points decision

== Broadcasting ==
Country	Broadcaster
Hungary	Sport 2
Ireland & United Kingdom	Setanta Sport
United States	Showtime

Preceded by vs. Jean-Marc Mormeck	David Haye's bouts 8 March 2008	Succeeded by vs. Monte Barrett
Preceded by vs. Mohamed Azzaoui	Enzo Maccarinelli's bouts 8 March 2008	Succeeded by vs. Matthew Ellis
