= David Haye vs. Audley Harrison =

Boxing match

Best of Enemies
- Date: 13 November 2010
- Venue: MEN Arena, Manchester, United Kingdom
- Title on the line: WBA Heavyweight Championship

Tale of the tape
Boxer	(United Kingdom) David Haye	(United Kingdom) Audley Harrison
Nickname	"The Hayemaker"	"A-Force"
Hometown	Bermondsey, London	Park Royal, London
Purse	£4,200,000	£1,500,000
Pre-fight record	24–1 (22 KO)	27–4 (20 KO)
Age	30 years, 1 month	39 years
Height	6 ft 3 in (191 cm)	6 ft 5 1/2 in (197 cm)
Weight	210 1/2 lb (95 kg)	253 1/2 lb (115 kg)
Style	Orthodox	Southpaw
Recognition	WBA; Heavyweight Champion; The Ring; No. 2 Ranked Heavyweight	WBA; No. 13 Ranked Heavyweight

Result
- Haye defeated Harrison via 3rd round TKO

David Haye vs. Audley Harrison, billed as Best of Enemies, was a professional boxing match contested on 13 November 2010 for the WBA Heavyweight championship.

== Background ==
After his stoppage win over former champion John Ruiz in his first defence, WBA champion David Haye entered into negotiations with the Klitschko brothers, with Wembley Stadium and Stamford Bridge being mentioned possible venues. These talks however were unsuccessful as the brothers agreed to face former champions Shannon Briggs and Samuel Peter instead. This left two main options for Haye: European champion (and former amateur teammate) Audley Harrison and former two-division champion Tomasz Adamek. Ultimately, Haye came to an agreement with Harrison to meet in November.

The build up to bout was marked by a great amount of trashtalk from both fighters, including Haye saying 'Fortunately, there are enough people in Britain who want to see him get destroyed, completely annihilated. That's why this fight is happening. They want me to close the curtain on the joke that is the Audley Harrison show'. Harrison said 'When I came out of the Olympics, they called me Muhammad Ali, then four years later I'm "Fraudley". But after this fight I'll be extraordinary'.

It was expected that Haye's superior speed, coupled with his uppercut, would give him the edge over the slower and innately more cautious Harrison.

This was only the third time in history that two Brits had faced each other for the heavyweight title, and the first on UK soil since Lennox Lewis vs. Frank Bruno in 1993.

== The fight ==
Harrison entered the ring to a chorus of boos, prompting BBC Radio 5 Live co-commentator Steve Bunce to comment that 'Audley looks troubled, he looks nervous and he looks tormented'.

The first round was extremely tentative with neither fighter landing any punches. The second round started in the same vein before the referee briefly halted the bout to encourage the pair to engage, prompting cheers from the crowd. Haye began throwing more through the rest of the round, but nothing seemed to trouble the challenger. Haye came out firing at the start of the third and he hurt Harrison with a big right hand. Haye followed up with a pair of left-right combinations that sent Harrison down. He beat the count, but Haye immediately launched a barrage of unanswered punching with Harrison against the ropes, prompting the referee to wave it off and giving Haye a third-round TKO victory. According to punchstats, Harrison only landed 2 (both jabs) of the 28 punches he threw throughout the whole bout.

== Aftermath ==
Harrison's performance was widely criticised by both boxing experts and fans, leading to the British Boxing Board of Control withholding some of his purse while a full investigation of the bout was carried out. After the investigation into the fight was concluded, Harrison would be granted his full purse on 11 January 2011.

Haye would again call out the Klitschko brothers, with his trainer Adam Booth saying to BBC Radio 5 Live 'They (the Klitschkos) want a defining fight and David wants a defining fight. David will be retiring in October next year so they haven't got a lot of time to speak sense. He'll take out Wladimir before summer and take care of Vitali after the summer'. Haye would face criticism for suggesting that he bet on himself to win in the third round, saying in a post fight interview 'I put a lot of money on the third round and a lot of my friends and family did. I didn't want to let them down by doing him too early. Ask around - I told everyone I'd knock him out in three rounds. That's exactly what I did. No way was he going into that fourth round'. He would later clarify that he didn't bet any money personally, which was accepted by the BBBofC.

== Undercard ==
Confirmed bouts:

Winner	Loser	Weight division/title belt(s) disputed	Result
(United Kingdom) George Groves	(United Kingdom) Kenny Anderson	Commonwealth Super middleweight title	6th-round TKO
(United Kingdom) Stuart Hall	(United Kingdom) Gary Davies	British Bantamweight title	7th-round TKO
(Serbia) Enad Ličina	(United States) Felix Cora Jr.	IBF World Cruiserweight title eliminator	Unanimous decision
(Germany) Edmund Gerber	(Republic of Ireland) Colin Kenna	Heavyweight (8 rounds)	1st-round TKO
(Venezuela) Johan Pérez	(United Kingdom) Johnny Greaves	Light welterweight (4 rounds)	Points decision
(United Kingdom) Navid Mansouri	(United Kingdom) Daryl Setterfield	Light middleweight (4 rounds)	Points decision
(United Kingdom) Jerome Wilson	(United Kingdom) Henry Janes	Welterweight (4 rounds)	1st-round TKO
(United Kingdom) Mark Heffron	(United Kingdom) Chris O'Brien	Welterweight (4 rounds)	1st-round KO

== Broadcasting ==
Country	Broadcaster
Denmark	TV2 Sport
Germany	ARD
Hungary	DigiSport
Poland	Polsat
United Kingdom	Sky Sports

Preceded by vs. John Ruiz	David Haye's bouts 13 November 2010	Succeeded by vs. Wladimir Klitschko
Preceded by vs. Michael Sprott II	Audley Harrison's bouts 13 November 2010	Succeeded by vs. Ali Adams
