= Wladimir Klitschko vs. David Haye =

Boxing competition

The War
- Date: 2 July 2011
- Venue: Imtech Arena, Altona, Hamburg, Germany
- Title(s) on the line: WBA (Unified), IBF, WBO, IBO, and The Ring heavyweight titles

Tale of the tape
Boxer	Wladimir Klitschko	David Haye
Nickname	Dr. Steelhammer	The Hayemaker
Hometown	Kyiv, Ukraine	Bermondsey, London, UK
Pre-fight record	55–3 (48 KO)	25–1 (23 KO)
Age	35 years, 3 months	30 years, 8 months
Height	6 ft 6 in (198 cm)	6 ft 3 in (191 cm)
Weight	242.6 lb (110 kg)	212.8 lb (97 kg)
Style	Orthodox	Orthodox
Recognition	IBF, WBO, IBO and The Ring; Heavyweight Champion; The Ring; No. 5 ranked pound-for-pound fighter	WBA; Heavyweight Champion; The Ring; No. 2 Ranked Heavyweight; 2-division world champion

Result
- Klitschko wins via 12-round unanimous decision (117-109, 118-108, 116-110)

Wladimir Klitschko vs. David Haye, billed as The Talk Ends Now, was a heavyweight unification fight between IBF, WBO, IBO, and The Ring champion Wladimir Klitschko, and WBA champion David Haye. The fight took place in Imtech Arena, Altona, Hamburg, Germany on July 2, 2011. Klitschko defeated Haye by unanimous decision.

== Background ==
In 2008 after becoming unified cruiserweight champion, David Haye moved up to heavyweight. Klitschko welcomed the challenge of Haye. Talks started immediately between Klitschko and Haye but came to nothing, even after Haye publicly confronted and challenged Klitschko at an event at the ExCeL London in April 2008. Haye reiterated a challenge to Klitschko to fight him in 2009. In his second fight, he wanted to fight JD Chapman who he claimed was a similar style to the Klitschkos. Haye also added that the heavyweight division was scared of him. In July 2008 Wladimir Klitschko said that Haye was a possible opponent for him to fight next. Haye started to call out the Klitschkos after he knocked out Monte Barret in the 5th round in 2008.

In late 2008 Haye and Vitali verbally agreed to terms to fight in the summer. However Klitschko fought mandatory challenger, Juan Carlos Gomez. Haye then turned his sights to Wladimir. In 2009 after protracted talks, Wladimir agreed to fight Haye on 20 June in Gelsenkirchen, Germany. In the build-up to that fight Klitschko labeled Haye an 'embarrassment' after Haye appeared wearing a T-shirt with the Klitschkos' severed heads. He also vowed to knock Haye out in the 12th round. Haye pulled out of the fight with a back injury, and hoped to postpone the fight until July 11. This did not happen and Haye was replaced by Ruslan Chagaev who Klitschko stopped in 9th round. Since then both Vitali and Wladimir had wanted to fight Haye, with Vitali wanting to have a fight with Haye in 2010 which never happened. Instead, Haye won the WBA title after defeating Nikolay Valuev.

== Build-up ==
On 16 April 2009, Haye wore a T-shirt depicting him holding the heads of the Klitschko brothers while standing atop their decapitated bodies. At the same time, he declared a war on both the Klitschko brothers, hoping to first defeat Wladimir, then Vitali. Two press conferences were held in announcement of the fight. The first one took place in Hamburg, the second in London. There was also an HBO Face Off held in New York City. At both press conferences David Haye refused to shake Klitschko's hand. Klitschko said it was a sign of lack of respect from Haye's side. Haye said that he did not want to shake Klitschko's hand, because "he doesn't want to do what Wladimir tells him to do." He said that Klitschko is a control freak who has to know and control what his opponents do. Haye promised that he would win by knockout, that the trash talk was over and that it was down to business, which was also one of the reasons why he didn't bring his infamous T-shirt. Klitschko asked about the T-shirt and wanted to see it. Haye again referred to Klitschko as a "control freak." Haye said that he intended to shake Klitschko's gloves when they are in the ring together, but only because it was the rules. At an interview on Sky, Haye also refused to come into the studio with Klitschko because he said he'd had enough of him, he'd seen too much of him – first in New York, then Hamburg and now in London. At the HBO Face Off, Haye said that you could feel the tension and "almost cut it with a knife". He also thought that Klitschko would punch him during the interview. Yet again Haye refused to shake Klitschko's hand.

A pre-fight news conference was held on June 27 in Hamburg. No new things were said. Haye got up and said that Klitschko was like a robot, and would malfunction on fight night. He said he was happy the fight was happening, because he was just a much better fighter. He also said that he would show a totally new game plan and would not fight like he had done in his other fights. Haye proclaimed that you could play his new iPhone game David Haye's knockout, where you could see what would happen on July 2. Haye's trainer Adam Booth got up to the microphone and only said: "Enjoy", and gave the word to Klitschko's trainer Emanuel Steward. Steward said it was a big fight and he was very happy. He said that he would rate it as the 2nd biggest, only behind Lennox Lewis vs. Mike Tyson. Klitschko said that he did not like Haye's attitude and that he would give him a lesson. He said he respected him as a fighter but not as a person. He promised to knock Haye out and that it would be good for Haye as a person. Vitali Klitschko wanted Haye to promise to be at the post press conference in front of everybody. Haye promised and said that Vitali should promise the same and not go with Wladimir to the ambulance after Haye had knocked him out. There was a scuffle and some punches between the two teams at the staredown, where Klitschko's manager Bernard Bönte wanted to end the staredown early (the previous occasion, it had lasted almost three minutes).

On 29 June, a public training session was held at a Mercedes Benz showroom in Hamburg, Germany. The two fighters showed off some skills and punches, while Adam Booth made a short parody on Klitschko.

The Haye camp protested the choice of Gino Rodriguez as referee for the fight, because Rodriguez had refereed some of Klitschko's other fights (including his loss to Corrie Sanders). The WBA Sanctioning Bodies then voted for the referee, resulting in favour of Rodriguez.

The weigh in took place on 1 July 2011 at Karstadt Sporthaus, Hamburg. Wladimir Klitschko weighed in at 243 lbs (110 kg). David Haye weighed in at 213 lbs (96 kg)

When being asked about the outcome, Mike Tyson believed Haye had "no chance" of beating Klitschko, while Lennox Lewis was more supportive of Haye, believing that he "has the speed, agility, endurance and strength to do it".

== iPhone game ==
David Haye released a controversial iPhone game, developed by Grubby Hands. The game allows players to decapitate an anonymous Russian heavyweight. A huge controversy was caused by this stunt, especially when David wore a T-shirt showing a decapitated Klitschko at a press conference to promote it.

== Result ==
Wladimir spent most of the fight boxing behind the jab and avoiding exchanges, while Haye attempted to get through with his counterattacks. In the middle rounds, Wladimir's coach Emmanuel Steward urged Wladimir to be more active but not take risks. Klitschko struggled to hit Haye with clean shots but was nonetheless in control for the majority of the fight as Haye was rarely able to close distance; his first moments of success came in the third round, but Haye was unable to replicate that until the twelfth when he staggered Klitschko with an overhand right. Klitschko was deducted a point in the seventh for pushing Haye down, while Haye received a count in the eleventh, presumably because the referee got sick of Haye constantly falling down. The fight went the full twelve rounds, with Klitschko winning by unanimous decision (118–108, 117–109, 116–110), successfully defending the IBF, IBO, WBO and The Ring heavyweight titles, as well as winning the WBA (Super) heavyweight title.

== Aftermath ==
With the victory, all major heavyweight titles – WBA, WBC, IBF, WBO and The Ring – were held by the Klitschko brothers: Vitali held the WBC title, while Wladimir held the rest, although observers believed that "the unequal distribution is by no means an indication of the balance of power within the family; it could just as well be the other way around". For the first time in history, all reigning heavyweight champions were brothers. Some also argued that with the victory, the Klitschkos essentially cleaned out the heavyweight division. According to SecondsOut, Klitschko and Haye earned $32 million each for the bout.

Haye revealed afterwards that he had a broken toe on his right foot, and claimed that it had hindered his game plan for the fight as he felt he was unable to jump out at Klitschko like he had previously in his career. Haye was subject to much derision and ridicule from within the boxing community and fans after citing his toe as part of the reason why he lost. Despite this Klitschko claims that Haye was unable to fight because he was just too good for him.

On 6 October, Klitschko announced his next fight. It was originally to be on 10 December 2011 against the former cruiserweight champion, French Jean-Marc Mormeck. The fight would have had taken place at Esprit Arena, Düsseldorf. It was to be Wladimir's first title defense of the WBA (Super) belt he had won against Haye. However, on 5 December, the fight was cancelled because Wladimir checked into a hospital to have a kidney stone removed. After the removal operation he suffered from fever and inflammation. The fight was rescheduled for 3 March 2012.

On 13 October, Haye announced his retirement from boxing. He stuck to his plans, as he before had said that he would not box after his 31st birthday. However, Vitali Klitschko was in negotiations for a possible bout with former WBA Heavyweight title holder Haye on March 3, 2012.

Haye came out of retirement to fight Derek Chisora in a bout sanctioned by the Luxembourg Boxing Federation in London on 14 July 2012, Haye defeated Chisora by knockout in the 5th Round.

Meanwhile, Klitschko, after beating Haye, went on to achieve another 8 successful defences of his titles until his defeat by Tyson Fury in November 2015.

== International broadcasting ==
The event was televised in 150 countries. Worldwide, around 500 million viewers reportedly watched at least part of the fight.

In the United Kingdom, the fight aired on Sky Box Office pay-per-view for £14.95; on the day of the fight, the price was £19.95 (€26.95). Due to unprecedented demand, phone and online bookings on Saturday suffered technical difficulties that left some customers unable to order the event. As a result, Sky announced that it would show the replay of the fight to all its customers at 9:00 AM, 1:00 PM and 7:00 PM the following day. The event registered approximately 1.17 million buys, setting a domestic record previously held by Floyd Mayweather Jr. vs. Ricky Hatton at 1.15 million.

In Ukraine, where the broadcast of the fight itself started at 11:55 PM and finished at 1:28 AM, the bout averaged 9.5 million viewers and drew a 20.45 rating in the 18+ demographic. In the 18+ (50+) (Note: Viewers aged 18+ from cities with population 50,000+) demographic it drew a 19.1 rating (71.9 share) while in the commercial (Note: Viewers aged 18–54 from cities with population 50,000+) demographic its rating stood at 18.1 (69.7 share). It was the highest-rated program on Ukrainian television in both demographics since 2008. A documentary about the Klitschko brothers called A Fairy Tale 12 Rounds Long, which aired before the fight at 11:10 PM, was the most popular documentary since 2002 and tenth-most popular television program since 2008, both in the 18+ (50+) demographic, with a 15.1 rating (45.6 share).

In Germany, the fight averaged 15.56 million viewers with 67.0 market share; at its peak, it was watched by 16.28 million people (75.7 share). In the 14–49 demographic, it averaged 7.51 million (69.8 share). It ended up being the fourth most popular television broadcast overall and the most popular broadcast in the 14–49 demographic in the country in 2011. It is also the highest rated boxing match involving one of the Klitschkos.

In the United States, HBO aired both live broadcast and same-day replay, with the latter drawing 1.242 million viewers. Though ratings for the live broadcast were not disclosed, Dan Rafael reported that both airings drew strong numbers and HBO executives were "excited how it performed, especially in relation to what they paid for it", and argued that the combined average viewership between the two airings was around 3 million or more.

In Hungary, almost 1.15 million people tuned in during the broadcast on Duna TV, averaging 588,000 viewers. It was the most watched television program on the network since 1998.

In Poland, where the fight was broadcast on three channels, it averaged 3.141 million viewers on TVP1, 246,000 on TVP Sport and 92,000 on TVP HD. Telewizja Polska also earned 435,000 zł from advertising.

In Croatia, the fight averaged 774,000 viewers on Nova TV, drawing a 18.6 rating and 60.7 share. The post-fight boxing studio drew a rating of 12.9, with a 35.7 share.

In Austria, the broadcast was carried by RTL. The fight itself, which started at 11:25 PM, drew 497,000 viewers in the 12+ demographic. The pre-fight program (started at 10:45 PM) averaged 423,000 viewers, while the closing ceremony and post-fight highlights (0:20 AM) drew 249,000.

In Denmark, the fight aired on a pay television channel TV 2 Sport where it averaged 93,000 viewers. It was the most popular television broadcast of the week on TV 2 Sport, drawing better ratings for the channel than the broadcast of that year's Wimbledon tournament.

In the Netherlands, where a world heavyweight boxing title bout was televised for the first time in decades, it drew 507,000 viewers on RTL 7, "well above" the channel's average.

Country	Broadcaster	HD (High Definition)
Australia	Main Event	
Austria	RTL	RTL HD
Brazil	ESPN Brasil	
Bulgaria	TV+	
Bulgaria	RING.BG	
Canada	HBO Canada	HBO HD
China	CCTV-5 (Note: Attributed to multiple sources:)	
Croatia	Nova TV	
Czech Republic	Sport 2	
Denmark	TV 2 Sport	TV 2 Sport HD
Fiji	Sky Pacific World PPV	
France	Orange Sport	Orange Sport HD
Germany	RTL	RTL HD
Hungary	Duna TV	
Iceland	Stöð 2 Sport	
Ireland	Sky Box Office	Sky Box Office HD
Ireland		Sky 3D
Indonesia	RCTI	
Israel	Sport +5 LIVE	
Italy	Sportitalia 2	
Japan	WOWOW	WOWOW HD
Lithuania	Lietuvos ryto TV	
Macedonia	Macedonian Radio-Television	
Malaysia	Astro SuperSport 2	
Moldova	Pro TV	
Netherlands	RTL 7	RTL 7 HD
New Zealand	SKY Box Office 201	
Norway	Viasat Sport	
Philippines	AKTV	
Poland	TVP 1	TVP HD
Poland	TVP Sport	
Portugal	Sport TV 2	
Qatar	Al Jazeera Sport 1	Al Jazeera Sport HD1
Qatar	Al Jazeera Sports +3	
Romania	Pro TV	Pro TV HD
Romania	Sport.ro	Sport.ro HD
Russia	Russia 2	
Russia	Sport 1	Sport 1 HD
Slovakia	Sport 2	
Slovenia	RTL	RTL HD
Spain	Digital+ PPV	
South Africa	SuperSport	SuperSport HD
Sweden	TV10	
Switzerland	RTL	RTL HD
Turkey	FOX	
Ukraine	Inter	
United Kingdom	Sky Box Office	Sky Box Office HD
United Kingdom		Sky 3D
United States	HBO	HBO HD

== Notes ==
Preceded by vs. Samuel Peter II	Wladimir Klitschko's bouts July 2, 2011	Succeeded by vs. Jean-Marc Mormeck
Preceded by vs. Audley Harrison	David Haye's bouts July 2, 2011	Succeeded by vs. Derek Chisora
