= David Haye vs. Derek Chisora =

Boxing match

Licensed to Thrill
- Date: 14 July 2012
- Venue: Boleyn Ground, Newham, London
- Title(s) on the line: vacant WBA Inter-Continental and WBO International heavyweight titles

Tale of the tape
Boxer	David Haye	Derek Chisora
Nickname	"Haymaker"	"Del Boy"
Hometown	Bermondsey, London	Finchley, London
Purse	£2,500,000	£500,000
Pre-fight record	25–2 (23 KOs)	15–3 (9 KOs)
Age	31 years, 9 months	28 years, 6 months
Height	6 ft 3 in (191 cm)	6 ft 2 in (188 cm)
Weight	210 lb (95 kg)	247 lb (112 kg)
Style	Orthodox	Orthodox
Recognition	WBO; No. 6 Ranked Heavyweight; 2-division world champion	Former British and Commonwealth heavyweight champion

Result
- Haye wins via 5th-round TKO

David Haye vs. Derek Chisora, billed as Licensed to Thrill, was a professional boxing match contested between former heavyweight champion, David Haye, and former world title challenger, Derek Chisora. The bout took place on 14 July 2012 at the Boleyn Ground, with Haye winning by technical knockout in the fifth round.

== Background ==
Chisora's previous fight laid the foundation for his match with Haye. That bout, in February 2012, resulted in a unanimous decision defeat against Vitali Klitschko, while challenging for the WBC heavyweight title. The fight was overshadowed by controversy. Chisora slapped Klitschko in the face at the weigh-in. Then, whilst in the ring before the pre-fight introductions, Chisora spat water in the face of his opponent's brother Wladimir Klitschko.

=== Haye and Chisora brawl ===
Haye was present amongst the media at the Klitschko vs Chisora post-fight press conference. During the conference, Haye began a verbal confrontation with both Klitschko, and his manager Bernd Bonte, challenging the WBC champion to a fight. Boente claimed Haye had turned down an opportunity to fight Klitschko, and that he would not get a second opportunity. Chisora then intervened, calling Haye an "embarrassment", and challenged Haye to a fight, to which Haye responded that Chisora had lost "three fights in a row".

Haye continued his verbal assault. Chisora taunted Haye, asking him "how's your toe?", and then left the stage to confront Haye face to face and, in front of the assembled media, the two British fighters and several bystanders became involved in a mass brawl. Haye threw punches at Chisora whilst holding a bottle in one hand, leading to Chisora accusing Haye of glassing him. Chisora's trainer Don Charles was also involved in the brawl and Haye's long-time trainer Adam Booth received a cut to the forehead whilst trying to break things up; Booth would later accuse one of Chisora's entourage of striking him with a bottle during the confrontation, though the cause turned out to be a camera tripod that had been picked up and brandished by Haye at the end of the melee, whilst in the aftermath, Chisora was caught on video threatening to "shoot Haye".

German authorities sought both Haye and Chisora following their involvement in the brawl. On 19 February, Chisora and Charles were arrested by German police at Munich Airport. Police detained Chisora, but released him without charge following questioning, whilst urging Haye to turn himself in.

On 21 February, Haye and Chisora both released formal statements about the incident. While Chisora "wholeheartedly" apologised for his involvement, Haye was less contrite, refusing to issue a direct apology for his involvement, claiming he had acted in self-defence.

Subsequent to a hearing in March the following year regarding the incident, Chisora had his British boxing license withdrawn, and the WBC initiated a motion to ban Chisora indefinitely and fine him for his involvement.

=== The fight is announced ===
On 8 May, it was announced Haye would come out of retirement to fight Chisora, and the bout would take place on 14 July, at the Boleyn Ground Stadium. It was also announced that BoxNation would promote the event in association with Team Sauerland and Hayemaker Promotions, and Alexander Povetkin would defend his WBA (Regular) heavyweight title against Hasim Rahman on the undercard. Additional security were present at the press conference and a steel fence was put in place to keep Haye and Chisora separated during the announcement.

On 9 May, tickets went on sale, with 17,000 being sold on the first day of sale. On 18 May, it was announced that the fight had been sanctioned by both the WBA and WBO, and licensed by the Luxembourg Boxing Federation.

On 11 July, it was announced that the fight would be scheduled for 10 rounds, rather than a 12 rounder, with the winner receiving approximately £20,000 for charity from the loser.

=== Reaction to the fight ===
Several boxers, boxing officials and governing bodies criticised the fight after it was announced. In particular, the WBC adopted a firm stance against the contest, threatening to revoke the licenses of anyone involved in the fight, including promoters, trainers, timekeepers, referees and undercard fighters.

The fight also garnered plenty of support. Former boxer Ricky Hatton defended the match, and said that Haye and Chisora were not breaking any rules and Chisora's manager Frank Warren stated that it was the "biggest fight of the year".

== Fight details ==
In front of a crowd of 30,000 in attendance. Chisora entered the stadium, hooded and masked to the theme from Gladiator, and Haye to his entry music "Ain't No Stoppin' Us Now" by McFadden & Whitehead. In the opening two rounds, Chisora applied constant pressure, with Haye landing scoring shots at range. The bout heated up at the end of the third round, as Chisora closed the distance and caught Haye with a flush left hook after the bell had gone, which appeared to hurt Haye. Chisora emerged at the start of the fourth round aggressively, exchanging punches with Haye. Towards the end of the fifth round, Haye landed with a quick, hard left hook, followed by a right hand, which knocked down Chisora for the first time in his career. At the eighth count, Chisora made it to his feet, Haye connected with a series of punches, knocking Chisora down for a second time, and though he regained his feet again, the referee waved the fight off, therefore giving Haye the win by TKO in the fifth round.

== Aftermath ==
In the post-fight press conference, Haye and Chisora expressed their respect for each other and concluded their rivalry. Haye was then challenged by Manuel Charr who was scheduled to face Vitali Klitschko later in the year. Between October 2018 and July 2021 Haye served as Chisora's manager.

The event drew approximately 300,000 pay-per-view buys in the United Kingdom on BoxNation.

== Fight card ==
Confirmed bouts:

Weight Class		vs.		Method	Round	Time	Notes
Heavyweight	David Haye	def.	Derek Chisora	TKO	5/10	2:59	^{Note 1}
Middleweight	Gary O'Sullivan	def.	Matthew Hall	UD	12/12		^{Note 2}
Lightweight	Liam Walsh	def.	Domenico Urbano	TKO	8/12	2:10	^{Note 3}
Light-middleweight	Ronnie Heffron	def.	Peter McDonagh	UD	8/8
Welterweight	Bradley Saunders	def.	Kevin McCauley	UD	6/6
Light-middleweight	Janis Cernauskis	def.	Karl Brabazon	TKO	2/4	1:00

^Note 1 For vacant WBA Inter-Continental and WBO International heavyweight titles
^Note 2 For vacant WBO International middleweight title
^Note 3 For vacant WBO European lightweight title

== Broadcasting ==
Country	Broadcaster
Country	Cable/Pay TV
United Kingdom	BoxNation

Preceded by vs. Wladimir Klitschko	David Haye's bouts 14 July 2012	Succeeded by vs. Mark de Mori
Preceded by vs. Vitali Klitschko	Derek Chisora's bouts 14 July 2012	Succeeded by vs. Héctor Alfredo Ávila
