= Jean-Marc Mormeck vs. David Haye =

Boxing match

Le Duel
- Date: 10 November 2007
- Venue: Palais des sports Marcel-Cerdan, Levallois-Perret, Hauts-de-Seine, France
- Title(s) on the line: WBA, WBC and The Ring cruiserweight titles

Tale of the tape
| Boxer | Jean-Marc Mormeck | David Haye |
| Nickname | The Marksman | The Hayemaker |
| Hometown | Pantin, Île-de-France, France | Bermondsey, London, UK |
| Pre-fight record | 33–3 (22 KO) | 19–1 (18 KO) |
| Age | 35 years, 5 months | 27 years |
| Height | 5 ft 11 in (180 cm) | 6 ft 3 in (191 cm) |
| Weight | 199 1/4 lb (90 kg) | 199 3/4 lb (91 kg) |
| Style | Orthodox | Orthodox |
| Recognition | WBA, WBC and The Ring; Cruiserweight Champion | WBC; No. 1 Ranked Cruiserweight; WBA; No. 3 Ranked Cruiserweight; The Ring; No. 4 Ranked Cruiserweight |

Result
- Haye wins by 7th-round TKO

Jean-Marc Mormeck vs. David Haye, billed as Le Duel, was a professional boxing match contested on 10 November 2007, for the WBA, WBC and The Ring cruiserweight championship.

== Background ==
After regaining the WBA, WBC, The Ring and lineal cruiserweight titles in his March 2007 rematch with O'Neil Bell, Jean-Marc Mormeck agreed to face European cruiserweight champion David Haye, overruling his promoter Don King who had wanted him to face Steve Cunningham (whom he also promoted). "King wanted me to meet him," Mormeck said about Cunningham "He doesn't give a toss whether I win or lose. He'd win which ever way it went. King has got money and he always wants more. He's used to having people at his feet begging him, but I don't do any of that."

Haye was returning to cruiserweight having made his heavyweight debut in April against Tomasz Bonin, after his stoppage victory Haye called out Mormeck saying "I would be mad not to take that fight and knock him out. I want that title."

The bout was originally set for 28 September, but it was pushed back to 10 November to avoid a clash with the Rugby World Cup.

WBO cruiserweight champion Enzo Maccarinelli, was part of the Setanta broadcast team for the fight, as there was plans to match him against the winner, with his promoter Frank Warren saying "If Mormeck wins, it's definitely a fight that can be made. But if Haye wins, it's a bit more problematic because he's turned down big money to fight Enzo once before. I hope Haye wins because there would be no excuse for him not to fight Enzo in February or March. That would be a huge match-up for British fans."

== The fight ==
The 1st round saw Haye countering Mormeck's forward rushes with right uppercuts and lefts into the liver. The next round saw Mormeck land a right hand on the chin of Haye but the challenger took the shot. Almost halfway through the 4th round, Mormeck landed a left hook followed by a right over the top with Haye in the neutral corner that sent the challenger down. He beat the count and was able to make it out of the round. Haye was able to recover in the next two round before early in the 7th landing a power right uppercut, left and right hook combination that floored the champion. Mormeck managed to get to his feet but referee Guido Cavalleri decided to wave it off. At the time of the stoppage Haye trailed on two of the three scorecards 56–57, while leading 58–55 on the third.

The victory meant Haye became the seventh Britain to then hold a major world title, along with Joe Calzaghe, Enzo Maccarinelli, Clinton Woods, Junior Witter, Gavin Rees and Ricky Hatton.

== Aftermath ==
Speaking after the bout Haye said "I worked my way back into the fight and showed great heart. If I'm landed flush, I'm landed flush, but it's 12 rounds. I came through and once I landed that upper cut I knew he was hurt. I could have kept going all night long."

== Undercard ==
Confirmed bouts:

| Winner | Loser | Weight division/title belt(s) disputed | Result |
|---|---|---|---|
| (France) Souleymane M'baye | (Panama) Ammeth Diaz | WBC Light welterweight eliminator | 4th round TKO |
| (France) Ali Chebah | (Brazil) Ueliton De Jesus | WBC Youth Super Lightweight title | 3rd round TKO |
| (France) Christophe Canclaux | (United Kingdom) Steve Conway | Light middleweight (8 rounds) | 3rd round TKO |
| (Puerto Rico) Francisco Palacios | (France) Andrey Zaitsev | Cruiserweight (8 rounds) | 4th round RTD |
| (France) Olivier Bonine | (Portugal) Nuno Cruz | Light welterweight (6 rounds) | Points decision |

== Broadcasting ==
| Country | Broadcaster |
|---|---|
| France | Canal+ |
| Ireland & United Kingdom | Setanta Sport |

| Preceded by vs. O'Neil Bell II | Jean-Marc Mormeck's bouts 10 November 2007 | Succeeded by vs. Vinny Maddalone |
| Preceded by vs. Tomasz Bonin | David Haye's bouts 10 November 2007 | Succeeded by vs. Enzo Maccarinelli |
