= Tony Bellew vs. David Haye II =

Boxing competition

Repeat Or Revenge
- Date: 5 May 2018
- Venue: The O2 Arena, Greenwich, London, UK

Tale of the tape
Boxer	(United Kingdom) Tony Bellew	(United Kingdom) David Haye
Nickname	"Bomber"	"The Hayemaker"
Hometown	Liverpool, Merseyside	Bermondsey, London
Purse	>£2,500,000	>£2,500,000
Pre-fight record	29–2–1 (19 KO)	28–3 (26 KO)
Age	35 years, 5 months	37 years, 6 months
Height	6 ft 3 in (191 cm)	6 ft 3 in (191 cm)
Weight	210 1/4 lb (95 kg)	220 lb (100 kg)
Style	Orthodox	Orthodox
Recognition	Former WBC Cruiserweight Champion	2-division world champion

Result
- Bellew defeated Haye via 5th round TKO

Tony Bellew vs. David Haye II, billed as Repeat Or Revenge, was a professional boxing match contested on 5 May 2018.

== Background ==
After his shock victory in their first fight, Tony Bellew stated that he would next fight in either November or December 2017 with his three options being WBO heavyweight champion Joseph Parker, WBC heavyweight champion Deontay Wilder and a rematch with Haye. Parker was his main interest.

In July 2017, Bellew admitted that a potential fight with widely regarded pound for pound number one fighter and unified light-heavyweight champion Andre Ward was of interest and the teams of the respective fighters were currently in negotiations. On 3 August, Hearn stated a rematch between Bellew and Haye was 'virtually dead', due to both fighters believing they are the A-side and have the right to demand ring walks, poster, changing rooms and split of purse. On 6 September, Hearn stated a deal could be made within seven days. According to trainer Dave Coldwell, both Haye and Bellew had held positive talks and looking more likely to agree to a fight, as long they stay on the same page and agree to the same terms. On 19 September, Haye agreed all the terms and tweeted Bellew to sign the contract. He said, "It's taken months of negotiating but teams have finally agreed all terms for Haye-Bellew 2. Will Bellew put pen to paper?" The fight was reported to take place on Sunday 17 December 2017. Promoter Eddie Hearn stated the fight was not a done deal, but he had hoped to confirm the fight within a week. Bellew replied the following day, tweeting, "I OBLIGE YOU @mrdavidhaye , happy? Now leave me alone with my family please. I'll see you soon enough!" The fight was officially confirmed on 29 September for the fight to take place at The O2 Arena in London. Bellew claimed the rematch wasn't personal any more, just business and hoping to dedicate a win to his late brother-in-law, who had died in August. Haye stated that Bellew wouldn't win the lottery twice. Like the first fight, it was scheduled to be shown live on Sky Box Office.

Haye split with trainer Shane McGuigan in June 2017. It was said that they had reached a mutual agreement and parted on good terms. Some rumours indicated that McGuigan had urged Haye to retire, which eventually caused the split. On 6 July, Haye announced that he had hired Cuban Ismael Salas as his new trainer.

However, on 20 November, it was reported that Haye had injured his arm and forced to pull out of the fight. In a statement, Haye said, "I am devastated to announce my much-anticipated rematch against Tony Bellew has been postponed until 24 March or 5 May, subject to scheduling. It was believed that the injury occurred during a stair conditioning session." Bellew was said to be disappointed with Haye's announcement, but stated he may take an interim bout. Hours after the cancellation was confirmed, Tyson Fury released a video on social media calling out Bellew. In the video, he said, "I'll be ready, willing and waiting to fight Tony Bellew, May 5, O2 Arena, London." Dillian Whyte tweeted Hearn about taking Haye's place and then called Bellew a coward for declining the fight. Speaking about a potential Fury fight, trainer Dave Coldwell said, "That's not a fight I would entertain whatsoever. Fury is big, long and very, very clever in that ring. There's no way that I'd be interested in that fight." Fury himself denigrated Bellew and his corner stating that: "They are not good enough to tie my shoelaces. They're not good enough to hold my jock strap." The fight was rescheduled for 5 May 2018. Haye weighed 220.2 lbs, 4 lbs lighter than the first fight. Bellew also came in lighter 210.4 lbs.

== The fight ==
Haye started the fight using his jab, leaving a mark around Bellew's right eye. As round three began, both boxers started getting closer and unloading power shots. As Haye started to step backwards around the ring, Bellew landed a clean left-right combination which dropped Haye. At this point it appeared Haye may have injured his ankle, with the Sky Sports commentary team mentioning this, as well as the post-fight interviewer. Haye later denied he was injured. Bellew then dropped Haye again with a hard left hook. Bellew came out cautiously in round four, still wary of Haye's power. In round five, both traded punches, but it was a left hook from Bellew that dropped Haye a third time. Haye managed to beat the count again, not long before Bellew started unloading a barrage of punches. With Haye against the ropes, referee Howard Foster stepped in at 2 minutes 14 seconds, giving Bellew his second stoppage win over Haye.

== Aftermath ==
Immediately after the fight Haye congratulated Bellew on the win. Bellew went on to dedicate the win to Ashley, his brother-in-law, who had died in August 2017. He also mentioned Andre Ward, who his team had brief negotiations with in 2017, Dillian Whyte as well the winner of the upcoming World Boxing Super Series final between Oleksandr Usyk and Murat Gassiev. Haye stated he would review the tapes and see what went wrong. According to CompuBox stats, Haye landed 42 of 189 punches thrown (22%) and Bellew landed 70 of his 219 thrown (32%).

On 12 June 2018, just over a month after the bout, Haye released a statement via social media announcing his retirement for boxing. In the statement, Haye spoke about his career from start to finish, all the injuries he suffered, rehab and also revealed he had spinal surgery in March 2015.

== Undercard ==
Confirmed bouts:

Winner	Loser	Weight division/title belt(s) disputed	Result
(United Kingdom) John Ryder	(United Kingdom) Jamie Cox	Super middleweight (12 rounds)	2nd round KO.
(Puerto Rico) Emmanuel Rodríguez	(United Kingdom) Paul Butler	vacant IBF World Bantamweight Championship^{Note 1}	Unanimous decision.
(United Kingdom) Joe Joyce	(Jamaica) Lenroy Thomas	Commonwealth Heavyweight Championship	2nd round KO.
(United Kingdom) Joshua Buatsi	(France) Stephane Cuevas	Light heavyweight (8 rounds)	5th round TKO.
(United Kingdom) James Tennyson	(United Kingdom) Martin Joseph Ward	Commonwealth & European Super Featherweight Championship	5th round TKO.
Preliminary bouts
(United Kingdom) Luke Campbell	(United Kingdom) Troy James	Light welterweight (6 rounds)	5th round TKO.
(United Kingdom) Kody Davies	(Poland) Przemyslaw Gorgon	Light heavyweight (4 rounds)	1st round TKO.
Non-TV bouts
(United Kingdom) Jordan Gill	(Republic of Ireland) Carl McDonald	Super featherweight (6 rounds)	Points decision.
Live floater bouts
(United States) Money Powell IV	(Hungary) Mark Krammerstodter	Middleweight (4 rounds)	4th round TKO.

^Note 1 Title only on the line for Rodríguez after Butler failed to make weight

== Broadcasting ==
Country	Broadcaster
Bulgaria	Diema Sport
Croatia	RTL
Denmark	TV3+
France	RMC Sport
Germany	DAZN
Hungary	Sport 2
Italy	Sky Sport
Middle East	OSN Sports
Sub-Saharan Africa	Kwesé Sports
Poland	Polsat
Ukraine	Inter
United States	AWE
United Kingdom	Sky Sports

Preceded by First Fight	Tony Bellew' bouts 5 May 2018	Succeeded by vs. Oleksandr Usyk
Preceded by First Fight	David Haye's bouts 5 May 2018	Retired
