= David Haye vs. John Ruiz =

Boxing match

Lord Of The Ring
- Date: 3 April 2010
- Venue: Manchester Arena, Manchester, United Kingdom
- Title(s) on the line: WBA heavyweight championship

Tale of the tape
Boxer	(United Kingdom) David Haye	(United States) John Ruiz
Nickname	"The Hayemaker"	"The Quietman"
Hometown	Bermondsey, London, UK	Chelsea, Massachusetts, US
Purse	£3,000,000	
Pre-fight record	23–1 (21 KO)	44–8–1 (1) (30 KO)
Age	29 years, 5 months	38 years, 2 months
Height	6 ft 3 in (191 cm)	6 ft 1 in (185 cm)
Weight	222 lb (101 kg)	231 lb (105 kg)
Style	Orthodox	Orthodox
Recognition	WBA; Heavyweight Champion; The Ring; No. 5 Ranked Heavyweight	WBA; No. 1 Ranked Heavyweight

Result
- Haye defeated Ruiz via 9th round TKO

David Haye vs. John Ruiz, billed as Lord Of The Ring, was a professional boxing match contested on 3 April 2010, for the WBA Heavyweight championship.

== Background ==
Before David Haye faced Nikolai Valuev for the WBA title in November 2009, it had been agreed that the winner of the bout would face mandatory challenger and former champion John Ruiz. Haye had hoped to stage the bout in his native London, with The O2 Arena and The New Den being considered but unavailable for the 3 April date, hence the Manchester Arena was chosen.

Ruiz claimed that he would change his usual jab and grab style saying that "You're going to see the old Ruiz, boxing and punching,"

This was the first Heavyweight title bout in the UK for a decade since Lennox Lewis stopped Francois Botha in 2000 and the first ever in Manchester.

Ruiz was aiming to join Muhammad Ali, Evander Holyfield, and Lennox Lewis as the only boxers ever to win a heavyweight title on three or more occasions.

== The fight ==
After only 25 seconds of the fight, Haye floored Ruiz with a left followed by a big right hand. Ruiz beat the count but was knocked down again later in the round with a punch to the back of the head. The referee, Guillermo Perez Pineda, docked Haye a point before giving Ruiz an eight-count. Ruiz had some success with his jab in the 4th round but Haye responded by rocking Ruiz with a pair of right crosses early in 5th before dropping the challenger again at the end of the round. A right hook had Ruiz down for a third time in the 6th. Haye continued to dominate before Ruiz's trainer Miguel Diaz threw in the towel with a minute left of the 9th round, giving Haye a TKO victory.

Haye became only the second person to stop Ruiz, the first since David Tua in 1996.

== Aftermath ==
Following his win Haye was again linked with the Klitschko brothers, however he opted to face Audley Harrison, after rejecting interest from Bernard Hopkins and Evander Holyfield.

Ruiz would retire after his defeat and would go on to open a Gym in Medford, Massachusetts.

== Undercard ==
Confirmed bouts:

== Broadcasting ==
Country	Broadcaster
Poland	Polsat
United Kingdom	Sky Sports

Preceded by vs. Nikolai Valuev	David Haye's bouts 3 April 2010	Succeeded by vs. Audley Harrison
Preceded by vs. Adnan Serin	John Ruiz's bouts 3 April 2010	Retired
