= David Haye vs. Tony Bellew =

Boxing competition

Grudge Match
- Date: 4 March 2017
- Venue: The O2 Arena, Greenwich, London, UK

Tale of the tape
Boxer	(United Kingdom) David Haye	(United Kingdom) Tony Bellew
Nickname	"The Hayemaker"	"Bomber"
Hometown	Bermondsey, London	Toxteth, Liverpool
Purse	£4,200,000	£2,800,000
Pre-fight record	28–2 (26 KO)	28–2–1 (18 KO)
Age	36 years, 4 months	34 years, 3 months
Height	6 ft 3 in (191 cm)	6 ft 3 in (191 cm)
Weight	224 1/2 lb (102 kg)	213 1/2 lb (97 kg)
Style	Orthodox	Orthodox
Recognition	WBO; No. 1 Ranked Heavyweight; IBF; No. 4 Ranked Heavyweight; WBA; No. 6 Ranked Heavyweight; The Ring; No. 8 Ranked Heavyweight	WBC; Cruiserweight Champion; The Ring; No. 3 Ranked Cruiserweight; TBRB; No. 5 Ranked Cruiserweight

Result
- Bellew defeated Haye via 11th round TKO

David Haye vs. Tony Bellew, billed as Grudge Match, was a professional boxing match contested on 4 March 2017.

== Background ==
Since making his 2016 comeback, David Haye had collected two quick stoppage victories over relatively unknown opponents. Despite being expected to face former WBO champion Shannon Briggs in September this never materialized.

In October, following his win over BJ Flores, WBC cruiserweight champion Tony Bellew immediately hit the ringside Haye with a verbal assault referring to him as 'Sideshow Bob'. This continued in the post-fight interview with Bellew stating Haye has been 'conning the British public' since he announced his comeback. Bellew's promoter, Eddie Hearn, claimed the fight could take place at heavyweight or at cruiserweight for Bellew's WBC title. On 25 November 2016, Hearn announced on Twitter that Haye and Bellew would face each other in a heavyweight bout on 4 March 2017 at The O2 Arena, London. The fight was to be shown on Sky Box Office and would be Bellew's first heavyweight fight. Haye started as the odds-on favourite.

== The fight ==
There was little to separate the two fighters until the sixth round, when Haye injured his achilles tendon, causing him to fall twice. Bellew then took control of the fight knocking Haye down and out of the ropes late in the eleventh round. Haye managed to make it to his feet, but his trainer Shane McGuigan threw in the towel, giving Bellew a TKO win. Bellew credited Haye for his bravery, while Haye refused to blame his injury and stated that Bellew was "by far the better fighter", though stated that he wanted a rematch. At the time of stoppage, Bellew led on all three scorecards 96–93.

== Aftermath ==
Speaking afterwards Bellew praised Haye, saying "In my eyes I've beaten the best cruiserweight this country has ever produced and one of the best heavyweights. I am honoured to fight in the same ring as him. I've looked up to him. He made the same mistake everybody else does. He underestimated me. Watch me on tape and I'm terrible but in the ring I'm harder to hit than you think." Bellew's Promoter Eddie Hearn told BBC Radio 5 Live, "We've got to go after a heavyweight world title for Bellew now. I am so pleased for him. He's secured the future for his family and they can live a wonderful life."

Despite the loss, Haye was widely praised for his performance in fighting on whilst severely injured. As Kevin Mitchell of The Guardian newspaper summed up of the fight:

Haye, staggering around the ring like a Saturday night drunk, went down swinging, his right ankle strapped in the ninth then unstrapped, his aged body sagging under every assault.....Even when thrashed through the ropes at the end, Haye clambered back and was willing to continue.... It will not seem so to him as he contemplates the fading of his days, but this was Haye's finest night."

On 14 March, Hearn said that Bellew would fight again in 2017, however a day later, he told Sky Sports that Bellew may need surgery on his broken hand which could see him out of action for up to five months. On 28 March, the WBC changed Bellew's world championship status to "Emeritus" champion.

== Undercard ==
Confirmed bouts:

Winner	Loser	Weight division/title belt(s) disputed	Result
(Republic of Ireland) Katie Taylor	(Italy) Monica Gentili	Featherweight (6 rounds)	5th round TKO.
(United Kingdom) Sam Eggington	(United States) Paulie Malignaggi	WBC international welterweight title	8th round KO.
(United Kingdom) Ohara Davies	(United Kingdom) Derry Mathews	WBC silver light welterweight title	3rd round TKO.
(United Kingdom) David Allen	(United Kingdom) David Howe	Heavyweight (6 rounds)	2nd round KO.
(United Kingdom) Lee Selby	(Spain) Andoni Gago	Super featherweight (10 rounds)	9th round TKO.
(United Kingdom) Ted Cheeseman	(United Kingdom) Jack Sellars	Light middleweight (8 rounds)	Points decision.
(United Kingdom) Jack Bonnalie	(United Kingdom) Craig Glover	Cruiserweight (4 rounds)	Points decision.

== Broadcasting ==
Country	Broadcaster
Australia	Main Event
Hungary	Sport 1
New Zealand	Sky Arena
United States	AWE
United Kingdom	Sky Sports

Preceded by vs. Arnold Gjergjaj	David Haye's bouts 4 March 2017	Succeeded by Rematch
Preceded by vs. BJ Flores	Tony Bellew's bouts 4 March 2017	Succeeded by Rematch
