= J. D. Chapman =

American boxer

John David Chapman, better known as JD Chapman (born March 17, 1983), is an American former professional boxer, who fought in the heavyweight division from 2002 to 2021.

== Career ==
Hailing from Arkansas, Chapman started out in toughman competitions before he turned pro in 2002 under the name "The Natural." He was trained at first by Michael Moorer then by Jeff Mayweather, and then by Norman Wilson; his manager was the very powerful Scott Hirsch, who netted his fighters Jameel McCline and Shannon Briggs Don King-arranged title fights.

Despite being undefeated for the first 30 fights of his career, none of Chapman's first 15 opponents had a positive record, with only 12 of his final 16 opponents having winning records. His most notable opponents were Chicago-based Edward Gutierrez, who was 15–0–1 coming into the bout, New York veteran John Carlo, who possessed a 14–1 record, and fellow undefeated prospect Matt Hicks at 7–0. He captured several regional heavyweight titles, including the IBF Southern Regional title, the North American Boxing Council title, the WBC Latino title, and the Arkansas State title.

His relationship with the strongly connected Hirsch granted him valuable exposure in the boxing press as a real heavyweight prospect. While Hirsch initially seemed determined to keep him along slowly, due to his limited amateur career, he eventually attempted to negotiate a fight between him and future heavyweight champion David Haye in 2008. However, Chapman turned the fight down, allegedly because the $100,000 offer for the fight was too low. Following this, he temporarily retired from boxing, claiming a diminished interest in the sport.

In 2021, he returned and fought twice more, losing the second time to the unheralded Terrell James Woods. He finished his career with a record of 30–1, with 26 knockouts.
