= Andoni Gago =

Spanish boxer

Personal information
- Nickname: El Macho
- Born: Bilbao, País Vasco, Spain
- Height: 5 ft 5 in (165 cm)
- Weight: Featherweight; Lightweight

Boxing career
- Stance: Orthodox

Boxing record
- Total fights: 34
- Wins: 25
- Win by KO: 7
- Losses: 5
- Draws: 4

Andoni Gago Lopez is a Spanish professional boxer who held the European featherweight title from 2019 to 2021.

== Professional career ==
Gago made his professional debut on 16 March 2012, scoring a four-round unanimous decision (UD) victory against Ryan Peleguer at the Frontón Bizkaia in Bilbao, Spain.

After compiling a record of 21–3–3 (6 KOs), he defeated Jesus Sanchez via twelve-round split decision (SD) on 8 June 2019 at the Bilbao Arena to capture the vacant European featherweight title. Two judges scored the bout in favour of Gago with 115–114 and 115–113, while the third judge scored it 116–112 for Sanchez.

== Professional boxing record ==
34 fights	25 wins	5 losses
By knockout	7	2
By decision	17	3
By disqualification	1	0
Draws	4	

No.	Result	Record	Opponent	Type	Round, time	Date	Location	Notes
34	Loss	25–5–4	Jazza Dickens	KO	5 (10), 2:52	22 Apr 2022	Echo Arena, Liverpool, England	
33	Win	25–4–4	Sander Diaz Jimenez	DQ	6 (8), 0:03	20 Nov 2021	Pabellón de La Casilla, Bilbao, Spain	
32	Loss	24–4–4	Karim Guerfi	SD	12	13 Aug 2021	Plaza de Toros de Puerto Banus, Marbella, Spain	Lost European featherweight title
31	Draw	24–3–4	Gavin McDonnell	TD	5 (12), 2:34	26 Mar 2021	Pabellón de la Vall d'Hebron, Barcelona, Spain	Retained European featherweight title; Majority TD after McDonnell cut from accidental head clash
30	Win	24–3–3	Brayan Mairena	TD	5 (8)	23 Oct 2020	Frontón Bizkaia, Bilbao, Spain	Unanimous TD after Gago injured from accidental head clash
29	Win	23–3–3	Carlos Arroyo	KO	2 (8)	29 Feb 2020	Navarra Arena, Pamplona, Spain	
28	Win	22–3–3	Jesus Sanchez	SD	12	8 Jun 2019	Bilbao Arena, Bilbao, Spain	Won vacant European featherweight title
27	Win	21–3–3	Edwin Tellez	UD	6	2 Feb 2019	Frontón Bizkaia, Bilbao, Spain	
26	Win	20–3–3	Arturo Lopez	UD	8	27 Jul 2018	Campo de Futbol Aeria, Cullera, Spain	
25	Win	19–3–3	Geoffrey dos Santos	UD	12	28 Apr 2018	Bilbao Arena, Bilbao, Spain	Won vacant European Union featherweight title
24	Draw	18–3–3	Victor Terrazas	TD	4 (10)	15 Dec 2017	Frontón Bizkaia, Bilbao, Spain	TD after Terrazas cut from accidental head clash
23	Win	18–3–2	Héctor Brea	PTS	6	18 Nov 2017	Frontón de Beraun, Rentería, Spain	
22	Win	17–3–2	Mark Szörös	KO	2 (8)	15 Apr 2017	Palacio de los Deportes, San Pedro de Alcántara, Spain	
21	Loss	16–3–2	Lee Selby	TKO	9 (10), 0:41	4 Mar 2017	The O2 Arena, London, England	
20	Win	16–2–2	Lorenzo Parra	UD	8	4 Feb 2017	Frontón Bizkaia, Bilbao, Spain	
19	Loss	15–2–2	Viorel Simion	UD	12	14 Oct 2016	Circus, Bucharest, Romania	For IBF Inter-Continental featherweight title
18	Win	15–1–2	Hermin Isava	UD	6	7 May 2016	Polideportivo de Fadura, Getxo, Spain	
17	Win	14–1–2	Robert Laki	KO	1 (12), 2:45	16 Apr 2016	Frontón Bizkaia, Bilbao, Spain	Won vacant IBF International featherweight title
16	Win	13–1–2	Miguel Gonzales	UD	6	30 Jan 2016	Frontón Bizkaia, Bilbao, Spain	
15	Win	12–1–2	Sergio Blanco	TD	6 (10)	12 Dec 2015	Palau Olímpic Vall d'Hebron, Barcelona, Spain	Retained Spanish featherweight title
14	Win	11–1–2	Sergio Romero	TKO	10 (10)	19 Jun 2015	Pabellón de La Casilla, Bilbao, Spain	Retained Spanish featherweight title
13	Win	10–1–2	Michael Isaac Carrero	UD	6	27 Mar 2015	Pabellón de La Casilla, Bilbao, Spain	
12	Win	9–1–2	Marc Vidal	UD	10	15 Nov 2014	Pabellón de La Casilla, Bilbao, Spain	Retained Spanish featherweight title
11	Win	8–1–2	Antonio Rodriguez	UD	10	2 Aug 2014	Holiday Beach Club, Benalmádena, Spain	Won vacant Spanish featherweight title
10	Win	7–1–2	Alae Karmoun	TKO	5 (6)	5 Apr 2014	Pabellón de La Casilla, Bilbao, Spain	
9	Loss	6–1–2	King Daluz	SD	10	27 Sep 2013	Hotel El Asador de Enrique, Madrid, Spain	
8	Win	6–0–2	Vitaly Shivanov	UD	4	3 Aug 2013	Hotel Hydros, Benalmádena, Spain	
7	Win	5–0–2	Daniel Bueno	TKO	3 (6)	18 May 2013	Pabellón de La Casilla, Bilbao, Spain	
6	Win	4–0–2	Ivan Ruiz Garrido	UD	4	1 Feb 2013	Frontón Bizkaia, Bilbao, Spain	
5	Draw	3–0–2	Kiko Amarillo	PTS	6	15 Dec 2012	Polideportivo Municipal del Centro, Viladecans, Spain	
4	Win	3–0–1	Vitaly Shivanov	PTS	4	30 Nov 2012	Frontón Bizkaia, Bilbao, Spain	
3	Draw	2–0–1	Kiko Amarillo	PTS	4	5 Oct 2012	Frontón Bizkaia, Bilbao, Spain	
2	Win	2–0	Olufemi Temitope	UD	4	2 Jun 2012	Polideportivo Txurdinaga, Bilbao, Spain	
1	Win	1–0	Ryan Peleguer	UD	4	16 Mar 2012	Frontón Bizkaia, Bilbao, Spain	

Sporting positions
Regional boxing titles
Vacant Title last held by Sergio Romero	Spanish featherweight champion 2 August 2014 – March 2016	Vacant Title next held by Marc Vidal
Vacant Title last held by Gottlieb Ndokosho	IBF International featherweight champion 16 April 2016 – 2017	Vacant Title next held by Sofiane Takoucht
Vacant Title last held by Marc Vidal	European Union featherweight champion 28 April 2018 – December 2018	Vacant Title next held by Jesus Sanchez
Vacant Title last held by Kiko Martínez	European featherweight champion 8 June 2018 – present	Incumbent
