= Klitschko brothers =

Ukrainian boxers

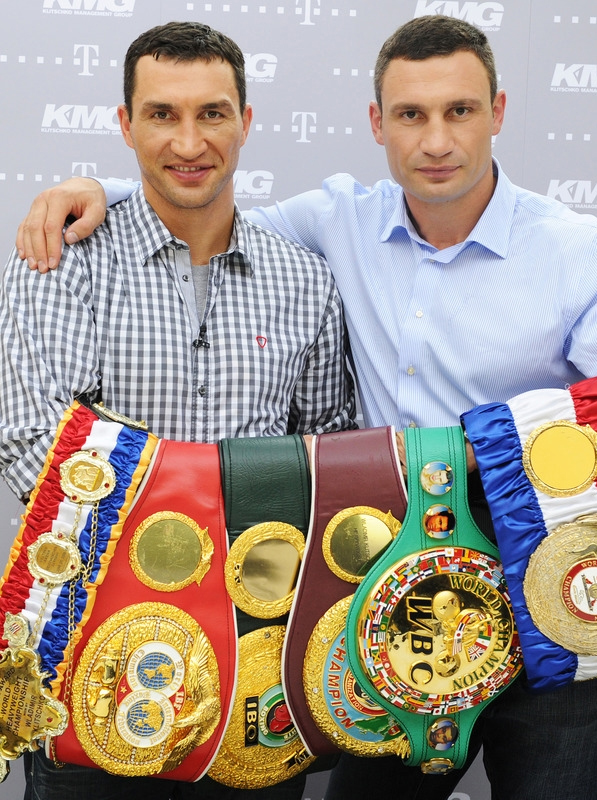
Wladimir (left) and Vitali (right) with every title in the heavyweight division, which they held from 2 July 2011 to 15 December 2013

Vitali Klitschko (born 19 July 1971) and Wladimir Klitschko (born 25 March 1976), known as the Klitschko Brothers, are Ukrainian former professional boxers. During their peak years between 2004 and 2015, they were considered the dominant world heavyweight champions of their era, and among the most successful champions in boxing history. In 2011, they entered the Guinness World Records book as brothers with most world heavyweight title fight wins (30 at the time; 40 as of 2020).

In the years following the retirement of heavyweight titlist Lennox Lewis in 2004, the Klitschko brothers would eventually accumulate all four major world heavyweight titles. Known for their exceptionally large physiques, speed, and punching power, they each developed a style that utilized their athleticism and arm reach to break down opponents.

In 2013, Vitali retired from boxing, relinquishing the WBC world title, and became a politician in his native Ukraine. Wladimir continued to successfully defend the WBA (Super), IBF, WBO, IBO, and The Ring magazine titles until he was defeated by Tyson Fury in 2015.

Both brothers hold doctorates in sports science.

== Biography ==
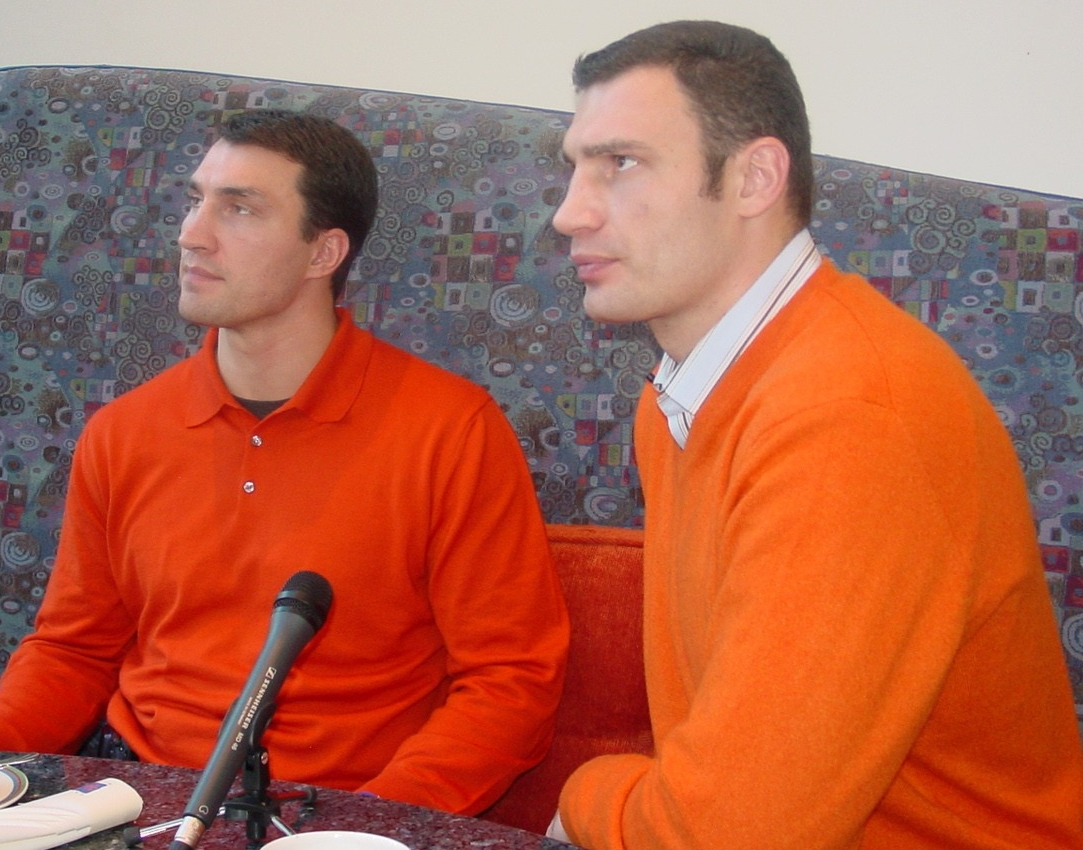
Brothers Wladimir (left) and Vitali Klitschko (right)

Both brothers made their professional debuts on November 16, 1996, in Hamburg. Since then, both have been world heavyweight boxing champions. They promised their mother that they would never fight each other.

=== 1996 Olympics ===
As an amateur, Wladimir Klitschko represented Ukraine at the 1996 Olympics, winning a gold medal in the super-heavyweight division. In 1996, when still an amateur, Vitali Klitschko tested positive for a banned substance and was removed from the Ukrainian boxing team.

=== 1999–2003: First world title reigns and defenses ===
In June 1999, Vitali Klitschko won the WBO Heavyweight title from Herbie Hide via second-round knockout. He successfully defended the title twice before losing it to Chris Byrd. Six months later, younger brother Wladimir dethroned Byrd via lopsided points decision. He registered five successful title defenses, all by TKO until suffering an upset TKO loss to Corrie Sanders in March 2003. Vitali Klitschko lost his fight with Lennox Lewis in his attempt to win the WBC, IBO, The Ring and lineal heavyweight championships.

=== 2004–2006: Second world title reigns and Vitali's first retirement ===
Vitali faced South African Corrie Sanders on 24 April 2004 for the WBC heavyweight championship and The Ring belts that had been vacated by Lewis. Vitali won by 8th round stoppage, he defended his titles just once, stopping Danny Williams in the 8th round before retiring in late 2005 due to injuries. Wladimir bounced back from a stoppage loss in a prior vacant title attempt, to dethrone Byrd for a second time for his IBF title in April 2006, this time by stoppage in the 7th round.

=== 2008–2012: Heavyweight title co-dominance, Vitali's final retirement ===
After a series of injuries, Vitali had a career break of almost four years. In his comeback fight in Berlin on October 11, 2008, he defeated Samuel Peter to regain the title of WBC world heavyweight champion. At that time Wladimir was already world heavyweight champion with the WBO, IBF and IBO. That was the first time in history with two brothers world champions at the same time. On July 2, 2011, Wladimir won the WBA Title, which means that the Klitschko brothers held all of the World Heavyweight Titles simultaneously for 2 years, 5 months & 13 days. Vitali retained the WBC Heavyweight Championship until 15 December 2013, relinquishing his belt in pursuit of his political aspirations in his native Ukraine.

The Klitschko brothers jointly run the professional boxing promotion companies "K2 Promotions" and "K2 East Promotions", as well as the "Klitschko Brothers Fund", a charity organization. They appear together on German TV shows and commercials, have a website shared between them, and support each other's training and fights.

=== 2013–2015: Wladimir dominance ===
After Vitali's retirement, Wladimir continued to reign as champion & successfully defend all remaining title belts except for the WBC belt. He eventually lost all the belts by unanimous decision to Tyson Fury. The brothers have a combined professional boxing record of 109 wins (94 KO's) and 7 defeats, including 46 world title fights.

== Reception and legacy ==
It's a major key in their success...And not just their size, but the way they use it. They're talented big guys. You can get a guy who is 6-10 with the longest reach in the world. If he doesn't know how to use that advantage, it won't do him any good.

— Chris Byrd praises the style of the Klitschko brothers.

Both Klitschko brothers are considered the best heavyweight boxers of their era. Having remained undefeated for a large majority of their careers and refusing to fight each other, both brothers remained largely unchallenged throughout their careers. Notably, both brothers were particularly well known for using their large size to nullify other heavyweights, particularly Wladimir, who became notorious for his use of the jab. In 2011, Wladimir and Vitali entered the Guinness World Records book as brothers with most world heavyweight title fight wins (30 at the time; 40 as of 2020).

Considered national heroes in Ukraine, in 2008 the Klitschko brothers were voted the 15th greatest Ukrainians of all time following a nation-wide poll that saw around 2.5 million people casting their votes. Boxing fights involving one of the Klitschko brothers attracted between 10 and 20 million viewers in Ukraine; some of their fights generated even bigger viewership numbers. Vitali and Wladimir have been named multiple times among the 100 most influential people in Ukraine by Korrespondent: they were ranked 60th and 95th respectively in 2006; 44th and 88th in 2010; 41st and 43rd in 2011; 16th and 51st in 2012; 10th and 45th in 2013. Vitali was also ranked 23rd in 2017 and 28th in 2019. Forbes named Wladimir the most popular celebrity in Ukraine in 2015, placing him ahead of a singer Svyatoslav Vakarchuk and Kvartal 95 Studio, and ranked him second and third in 2012 and 2013 respectively (the ranking wasn't conducted in 2014); Vitali was ranked fifth in 2012.

The Klitschkos were also considered big stars in Germany. A survey carried out by TNS for the Horizont Sport Business in 2003 showed that Wladimir Klitschko was recognized by 91.7% of Germans while Vitali was recognized by 90.9% of respondents, making them the fourth and sixth most recognized athlete in Germany at the time respectively. According to the same survey, 70.7% of respondents celebrated Vitali's successes while 70.5% celebrated Wladimir's, making them second and third most beloved athlete in Germany at the time respectively. According to DW, another research conducted no later than 2011 showed that nearly 99% of people in Germany recognized the Klitschko brothers. The CPI Index conducted by the agency Celebrity Performance in 2012 had the Klitschkos ranked second on the list of the most marketable celebrities in Germany, while in 2014, based on a survey of 1151 respondents that was conducted by the same agency, the Klitschko brothers were ranked 6th in the "2013 Person of the Year" category. At least six of their fights finished among the top 10 most-watched television broadcasts of the year; Wladimir's fight against David Haye was the most watched broadcast of 2011 in the 14–49 demographic. Fifteen of their fights generated over 10 million average viewers, and Wladimir's world heavyweight title defense against Eddie Chambers in March 2010 drew bigger viewership numbers on RTL than the return of the Formula One legend voted the greatest German athlete of the 20th century Michael Schumacher.

Credited for selling out sports stadiums, the Klitschkos had ten of their fights take place at sports stadiums in Germany, Switzerland, Poland and United Kingdom with all but one having attendances ranging from 40,000 to 90,000.

Known for charity work and philanthropy, the Klitschkos are two of only 15 living current or former athletes that have been named UNESCO Champions for Sport.

=== Vitali Klitschko ===
Wladimir hits very hard, harder than (Mike) Tyson...At one point, they ran 12 800-meter [roughly a half mile] sprints, each under 3 minutes, with a minute rest between each one...I timed every one and every one was under 3 minutes. I never saw a heavyweight do anything even close to that. They work their asses off. To be able to do that, two 250-pound guys – whew. They're two of the best athletes I've ever trained.

— Freddie Roach, who trained both the Klitschko brothers and Mike Tyson, on the athleticism of the brothers.

Having never been knocked down, Vitali Klitschko is widely regarded as the tougher fighter of the two. His 87% knockout percentage is one of the best knockout-to-fight ratios of any champion in heavyweight boxing history. Vitali was also known for being unusually dominant in his fights, having almost never lost a round in his professional career as a boxer. During his time as WBC champion, Vitali Klitschko was described as being the best of his time, and George Foreman stated that he has the best straight left in the division.

Throughout his career, Vitali has defeated 15 boxers for the world heavyweight title, the fifth-most in history (tied with Lennox Lewis), including two – Corrie Sanders and Danny Williams – for The Ring world heavyweight championship. Klitschko is one of nine boxers to defeat at least ten different fighters for the world heavyweight title. He is the only heavyweight boxer to have reigned as world champion in three different decades. Klitschko and George Foreman are the only heavyweight boxers in history to defend a world title after turning 40.

As of April 2025, BoxRec ranks Vitali at No. 96 among the greatest fighters of all time, pound for pound. According to BoxRec, Vitali has defeated 7 previously undefeated fighters with a combined record 135–0–3 (95 KOs) – these seven included Alben Belinski (professional record 5–0, five KOs coming into the fight), Ed Mahone (21–0–2, 21 KOs), Timo Hoffmann (22–0, 13 KOs), Chris Arreola (27–0, 24 KOs), Kevin Johnson (22–0–1, 9 KOs), Odlanier Solis (17–0, 12 KOs) and Manuel Charr (21–0, 11 KOs). Vitali has defeated 7 current or former world champions throughout his career. Those included heavyweight champions Herbie Hide, Corrie Sanders, Shannon Briggs and Samuel Peter, two-weight world champion Tomasz Adamek and cruiserweight champions Orlin Norris and Juan Carlos Gomez.

At the end of 2004, Vitali was honoured with the Hero of Ukraine Order of State, the highest Ukrainian honour, for his achievements and contributions to the development of Ukrainian sports. In 2010, Vitali was awarded the German Cross of the Order of Merit, the highest German honour, for his social and political engagement. In 2013, Klitschko was awarded the Georgian Presidential Order of Excellence. In 2018, Vitali was inducted into the International Boxing Hall of Fame. He was elected in his first year of eligibility.

=== Wladimir Klitschko ===
As heavyweight champion, Wladimir was unbeaten for over a decade. Wladimir Klitschko is considered to be one of the greatest heavyweight champions of all time, and amongst the hardest punching knockout artists in history. He has been heavily praised for his fundamental approach to boxing, during which he nullifies opponents with his jab, before knocking opponents out with a straight right. While not as durable as Vitali, his knowledge of the fundamentals and athleticism gave him considerable advantage over other heavyweights. The twelve undefeated fighters that Wladimir has beaten in his career is considered a record at heavyweight.

During Wladimir's reign as world heavyweight champion, his fights would reportedly draw up to 500 million viewers worldwide. (Note: Attributed to multiple sources:) Klitschko has been named multiple times among the 100 highest paid athletes in the world by Forbes: he was ranked 24th in 2012 (Forbes' inaugural list; estimated income $28 million between 1 June 2011 and 1 June 2012), 41st in 2013 ($24 million), 25th in 2014 ($28 million), 63rd in 2015 ($21.5 million) and 98th in 2017. During his active career Klitschko was only omitted from the Forbes' list once, in 2016, despite the fact that he reportedly earned $22.5 million for the fight against Tyson Fury in November 2015 (100th-ranked Buster Posey earned $20.8 million; 85th-ranked Conor McGregor earned $22 million). Wladimir Klitschko's total professional career earnings are estimated to be around €150 million.

Throughout his career, Wladimir has defeated 23 boxers for the world heavyweight championship, the most in boxing history. He holds several historical records, including holding the world heavyweight championship longer than any other boxer in history at 4,382 days (12 years); the most beaten opponents and wins in world heavyweight title bouts since the international expansion of boxing governing bodies, at 23 and 25 respectively; the most wins in unified title bouts and the longest unified championship reign in professional boxing history at 15 title bouts and 14 consecutive defenses respectively; and has the second most total successful title defenses of any heavyweight boxer with 23 (including his first reign as WBO champion), behind Joe Louis (25) and ahead of Larry Holmes (20) and Muhammad Ali (19). Klitschko fought in 29 world heavyweight title fights, more than any other boxer in history.

As of April 2025, BoxRec ranks Wladimir Klitschko at No. 69 among greatest boxers of all time, pound for pound. According to BoxRec, Wladimir has also defeated 12 previously undefeated fighters with a combined record 267–0–5 (174 KOs) – these 12 included Najee Shaheed (professional record 16–0–1, 8 KOs coming into the fight), Zoran Vujicic (14–0, 6 KOs), Eliseo Castillo (18–0–1, 14 KOs), Samuel Peter (24–0, 21 KOs), Calvin Brock (29–0, 22 KOs), Sultan Ibragimov (22–0–1, 17 KOs), Ruslan Chagaev (25–0–1, 17 KOs), Mariusz Wach (27–0, 15 KOs), Francesco Pianeta (28–0–1, 15 KOs), Alexander Povetkin (26–0, 18 KOs), Kubrat Pulev (20–0, 11 KOs) and Bryant Jennings (19–0, 10 KOs). Wladimir has beaten 9 current or former world champions throughout his career. These included heavyweight champions Chris Byrd (twice), Ray Mercer, Lamon Brewster, Samuel Peter (twice), Sultan Ibragimov, Hasim Rahman and Ruslan Chagaev, two-weight world champion David Haye and unified cruiserweight champion Jean-Marc Mormeck; their combined title fight record stands at 29–14–2, 15 KOs (28–4–2, 14 KOs when excluding fights against Wladimir).

In 2017, Wladimir was honoured with the Order of Liberty, the highest Ukrainian honour that can be awarded to a person of any nationality, for his achievements in sports and contribution to the economical, scientific and cultural development of Ukraine. In 2021, Klitschko was inducted into the International Boxing Hall of Fame. Just like his brother, Wladimir was elected in his first year of eligibility, having been chosen over Miguel Cotto and James Toney by a panel of around 200 international boxing historians.

=== Criticism ===
A criticism of the Klitschkos is that their dominant championship reign was the result of a heavyweight landscape devoid of world class competition. Previous heavyweight eras had multiple boxers considered world class fighters competing, such as Joe Frazier, Muhammad Ali and George Foreman during the 1970s, and Mike Tyson, Lennox Lewis and Evander Holyfield during the 1990s. According to some observers, this was not the case for the Klitschkos, who were able to dominate other heavyweights with relative ease.

Wladimir Klitschko's style receives strong criticism from the boxing community, commonly being described as "boring" or "robotic". While initially an exciting fighter, a series of losses led him to hire legendary boxing trainer Emmanuel Steward to cultivate his defensive abilities. At 6′ 6″, and one of the largest heavyweights in the division, Wladimir typically relies on an excellent jab to keep opponents at arms reach, and then clinching opponents once they get too close. This was meant to fatigue opponents before he would knock them out in the later rounds or win on scorecards.

== Recognition ==
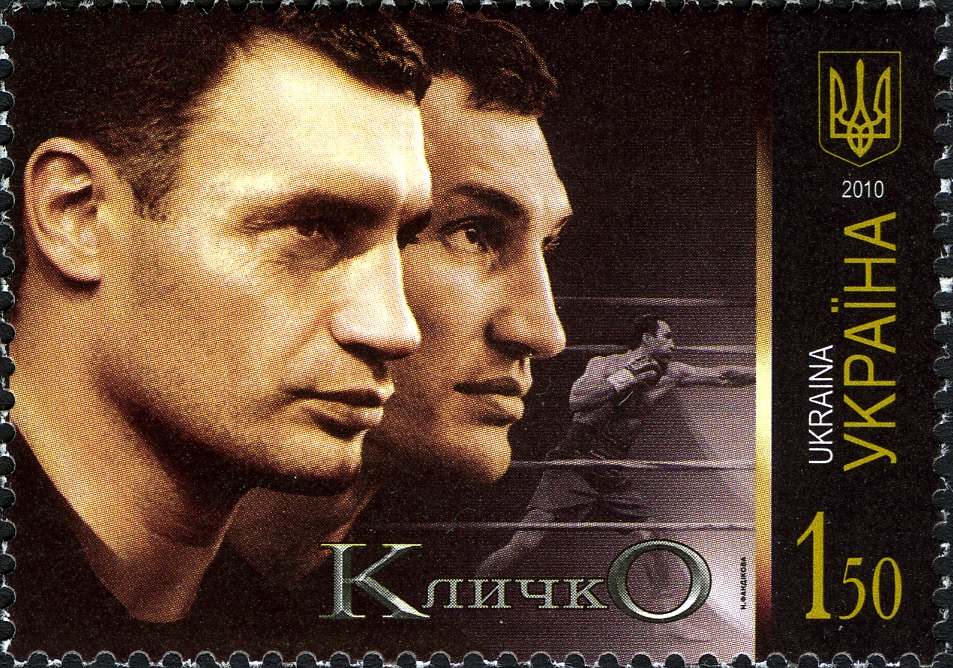
Klitschko brothers on a 2010 Ukrainian stamp

- Asteroid 212723 Klitschko, which was discovered at Andrushivka in 2007, is named after the Klitschko brothers.
- In 2010, "Klitschko" postage stamps were issued by Ukrposhta, the national postal service of Ukraine.
