= Mark de Mori =

Australian boxer (born 1982)

Personal information
- Nickname: The Viking
- Nationality: Australian
- Born: 11 February 1982 (age 44) Perth, Western Australia, Australia
- Height: 1.88 m (6 ft 2 in)
- Weight: Heavyweight

Boxing career
- Stance: Orthodox

Boxing record
- Total fights: 51
- Wins: 45
- Win by KO: 40
- Losses: 4
- Draws: 2

Mark de Mori (born 11 February 1982) is an Australian professional boxer.

== Early life and amateur career ==
De Mori grew up in the suburbs of Perth. He was supposedly deaf until the age of four and suffered chronic asthma attacks throughout his childhood and early teenage years. Whilst recovering, he became increasingly drawn to boxing and taught himself to box by watching videos and attempting to recreate the moves. It has been claimed that De Mori took part in 11 fights during his time as an amateur, winning all. However, records indicate that he lost at least one bout.

== Professional career ==
De Mori turned professional at the age of 22. He knocked out five of his first six opponents before taking an 18-month break from the sport.

In 2007, De Mori signed a three-year deal with prominent boxing promoter Don King. King cited "youth and exciting style" as the reason he put faith in De Mori, as he slowly worked his way up the ranks. One year into his deal with King, De Mori scored an eight-round win by unanimous decision over Ed Mahone in New Zealand. Mahone had been the favourite heading into the fight but was worn down by De Mori's 'jab and move' approach.

In 2009, De Mori won a further two fights in the US, both by knockout as a result of body blows, ranking him the number 17 heavyweight in the world by the World Boxing Council (WBC) and further increasing global interest in his potential as a heavyweight contender.

De Mori won the World Boxing Union (WBU) title in May 2013 with a corner retirement win over Adnan Buharalija, and the World Boxing Federation (WBF) title in November 2013 with a unanimous decision win over Ivica Perkovic. Promoter Anthony Coleiro stated "He is the first Australian heavyweight to win two world titles; this is history".

In 2014, De Mori scored an incredible first-round TKO victory over Bosnian Zeljko Bojic.

In 2015, in Niedersachsen, Germany, he stopped German Marcel Zeller in less than a round.

De Mori has been ranked as high as #7 in the world with the World Boxing Association (WBA) and #15 with the WBC.

=== De Mori vs. Haye ===
On 24 November 2015, it was announced at a press conference that De Mori would be the comeback opponent of former heavyweight champion David Haye. The bout took place on 16 January 2016 at The O2 Arena in London and was promoted by Salter Brothers Entertainment. De Mori hinted prior to the bout that he would try to exploit Haye's weakness of having six pins in his right shoulder. De Mori looked bothered by the first jab Haye threw and thereafter it was one-way traffic. Haye, set up the finish with huge overhand right and De Mori was unconscious before he hit the canvas with 49 seconds left in the round. De Mori was ranked 10th by the WBA before his defeat to Haye.

=== Split with King ===
In 2015, De Mori was given an early release from his contract with Don King and "a lump of cash" after Canadian Bermane Stiverne, another client of King's, failed to retain the WBC heavyweight title. King reportedly had De Mori as the next challenger for Stiverne prior to his defeat to Deontay Wilder in January 2015, and according to De Mori this was the reason for his contract release.

=== De Mori vs. Hrgović ===
On 23 December 2023, a 41-year-old De Mori challenged 31-year-old Croatian boxer Filip Hrgović (16–0, 13 KOs) to a ten-round bout. The fight took place at the Kingdom Arena in Riyadh, Saudi Arabia on the undercard of Anthony Joshua vs. Otto Wallin. Within a minute of the first bell, De Mori had hit the canvas. Two minutes into the bout, the referee called a stop to the contest after Hrgović scored repeated punches to the back of De Mori's head as he turned away from his opponent, and the referee stopped the contest.

== Fighting style ==
De Mori has occasionally been accused of adopting an 'arrogant' style in the ring, as he tends to keep his fists low, rather than in front of his face. The stance is similar to that of famous American boxers from De Mori's childhood that he attempts to replicate. The stance, which has proven successful, has angered previous opponents.

== Personal life ==
Although lessened, De Mori's asthma remains. He has said that his private gym, the Odjebi training centre in Split, "has a good climate and is really good for my asthma".

De Mori lived in Croatia for 10 years, before returning back to Perth, Western Australia in January 2023.
