= David Haye =

British boxer (born 1980)

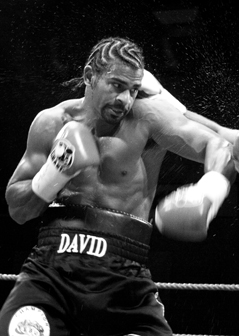
- Haye vs. Ismail Abdoul, 2006

Personal information
- Nickname: The Hayemaker
- Born: David Deron Haye; 13 October 1980 (age 46) Bermondsey, London, England
- Height: 6 ft 3 in (191 cm)
- Weight: Cruiserweight; Heavyweight

Boxing career
- Reach: 78 in (198 cm)
- Stance: Orthodox

Boxing record
- Total fights: 32
- Wins: 28
- Win by KO: 26
- Losses: 4
Medal record
Men's amateur boxing
Representing England
Trofeo Italia
Gold medal – first place	Naples 2002	Heavyweight
World Amateur Championships
Silver medal – second place	Belfast 2001	Heavyweight
Copenhagen Cup
Gold medal – first place	Copenhagen 2000	Heavyweight

David Deron Haye (born 13 October 1980) is a British former professional boxer who competed between 2002 and 2018. He is a world champion in two weight classes, having held the unified, (Note: World Boxing Association (WBA), World Boxing Council (WBC), and the World Boxing Organization (WBO) titles.) and the Ring magazine cruiserweight championship from 2007 to 2008; and the WBA heavyweight title from 2009 to 2011. At regional level, he held the European cruiserweight title from 2005 to 2007. As an amateur, he was the first British boxer to reach the final of the World Championships, where he won a silver medal in 2001.

Haye was ranked by BoxRec as the world's No.1 cruiserweight from 2005 to 2007, and was also ranked within ten best in 2003 and 2004. Along with Evander Holyfield and Oleksandr Usyk, Haye is one of only three boxers in history to have unified the cruiserweight world titles and become a world heavyweight champion. As of June 2026, BoxRec ranks Haye as the greatest British cruiserweight of all time and the 52nd greatest overall British fighter.

Haye founded his own boxing promotional firm, Hayemaker Promotions, in 2008. He became a vegan in 2014 and launched his own range of vegan protein powder later that year.

== Early life ==
David Deron Haye was born in the Bermondsey area of London on 13 October 1980. He grew up in Bermondsey for most of his childhood, and attended Bacon's College in Rotherhithe.

== Amateur career ==
At the age of eighteen, Haye competed in the light-heavyweight division at the 1999 World Amateur Boxing Championships in Houston, Texas. He knocked out then-ABA light-heavyweight champion Courtney Fry, but missed out on the 2000 Sydney Olympics after a controversial defeat in the qualifier in which he was eliminated by experienced American Michael Simms early in the contest.

At the 2001 World Championships in Belfast, Haye fought in the heavyweight division where he defeated Sebastian Köber to reach the final. In this bout he managed to score a standing eight count against Odlanier Solís, but was later stopped by the Cuban in round three to earn a silver medal.

Haye's claimed amateur record was 83–13 though his wins are likely half that amount and he has been found to have a few more losses.

== Professional career ==
=== Early career ===
Based in Bermondsey, Haye turned professional in December 2002, aged 22. In his first fight he defeated Tony Booth via second-round corner retirement (RTD). In 2003 he won seven fights, two of which were the only fights he has fought in the United States. He won all by knockout (KO), the most notable being a fourth-round KO of Lolenga Mock, in which Haye had to come off the floor to win.

Haye's fights were regularly seen on the BBC and his popularity began to grow in 2004, when he dispatched the 39-year-old former world champion "King" Arthur Williams in three rounds.

==== Haye vs. Thompson ====
Later that year, in his eleventh fight, he fought 40-year-old former WBO champion Carl Thompson in a 'youth vs. experience' match-up. Haye started fast and alarmingly caught Thompson with constant barrages of power punches, coming close to forcing a stoppage at numerous points over the first few rounds.

Gradually, despite the early punishment he received, Thompson warmed up and worked his way into the fight whilst Haye seemed to tire and slow down. Thompson began to pressure Haye and knocked Haye down with a chopping right hand in round five. With seven seconds left in the round, Thompson landed two jabs followed by a flush right hand which cleanly caught a fatigued Haye, and compelled Haye's corner to throw in the towel; Haye was leading on all three scorecards before the stoppage.

=== European champion ===
Haye returned against Estonian Valery Semishkur, winning by technical knockout (TKO) in round one, then defeated Garry Delaney by a third-round TKO. Following two more fights against Glen Kelly and Vincenzo Rossitto, Haye faced Alexander Gurov for the European cruiserweight title. Haye easily knocked out Gurov with a single right hand in just 45 seconds.

==== Haye vs. Fragomeni ====
In January 2006, Haye signed a three-year contract with former Lennox Lewis promoter Frank Maloney to further his world title ambitions. He successfully defended his European title against Ismail Abdoul in a lopsided twelve-round decision. He defeated Giacobbe Fragomeni, when he broke through the Italian's defences in the ninth round, finally flooring his man in a flurry of punches. Haye had waited seven years for the opportunity to defeat Fragomeni, who controversially out-pointed him as an amateur in the final qualifying tournament for the Sydney Games.

Haye's cameo at heavyweight in April 2007 resulted in a first-round KO win over Polish fighter Tomasz Bonin, who at the time was ranked No. 9 by the WBC and had only one loss, against Audley Harrison. Haye admitted he was taking "a crazy step up" when he fought Bonin at Wembley Arena. Haye said in a post-fight interview "If you asked me when I was three years old, I'd say I'm going to be the heavyweight champion of world. I never said cruiserweight. It's what I wanted to do since I can remember. I always wanted to be the main man in boxing. I want everyone to recognise I can beat every other boxer in the world. That's why I'm fighting the guy I'm fighting. I really want to prove to everyone I am the man."

=== Unified cruiserweight champion ===
==== Haye vs. Mormeck ====
Haye challenged Jean-Marc Mormeck (33–3, 22 KOs) on 10 November 2007 for the WBA, WBC, The Ring and lineal cruiserweight titles. Following being knocked down himself in the fourth round, Haye unleashed a combination made up of a right uppercut, left, then right hook to floor Mormeck in the seventh round to win by TKO. The victory meant Haye became Britain's sixth world champion. "I worked my way back into the fight and showed great heart, 17 weeks of hard work have paid off." The victory confirmed Haye's arrival as a genuine world class fighter. At this point Haye made his initial mark on history as Britain's first two-belt cruiserweight champion.

The Mormeck fight was expected to be Haye's last fight in the cruiserweight division. However Haye would be tempted into a unification cruiserweight bout for the most lucrative fight of his career.

==== Haye vs. Maccarinelli ====
Haye and Enzo Maccarinelli (28–1, 21 KOs) met in an all-British world cruiserweight title fight, in the early hours of 9 March 2008 at O2 Arena in London. Haye's WBA, WBC, and The Ring titles were at stake, while Maccarinelli's WBO title was on the line. British trade paper Boxing News produced a pullout special on the match, which was widely billed as the biggest all-British bout since Chris Eubank met Nigel Benn. As both fighters were hard punchers with excellent KO records, a short fight was predicted. These predictions proved to be correct, as Haye knocked out Maccarinelli in the second round of the contest. Commenting on the fight and of the prospect of working again with Frank Warren, Maccarinelli's promoter, Haye said, "We thank Frank for sacrificing Maccarinelli, but we'd feel immense guilt if we took any more free money from Sports Network. I have a hard enough time sleeping at night as it is."

=== Heavyweight ===
Haye described the victory over Maccarinelli as "the final piece" in his cruiserweight jigsaw. Haye then defeated heavyweight Monte Barrett at The O2 Arena in London on 15 November 2008, winning via TKO in the fifth round.

WBC heavyweight champion Vitali Klitschko confirmed he would defend his title in a fight with Haye to take place on 20 June 2009, at Stamford Bridge in London. Instead, his younger brother, WBO, IBF, and IBO champion Wladimir Klitschko agreed to fight Haye the same date in Gelsenkirchen, Germany. Haye pulled out of the fight with a back injury.

=== WBA heavyweight champion ===
==== Haye vs. Valuev ====
Haye then confirmed that he would meet the WBA champion Nikolay Valuev (50–1, 34 KOs) on 7 November 2009 in the Nuremberg Arena, Nuremberg, Germany. Haye's former trainer Adam Booth said it was a fight that Valuev wanted; it was billed as David and Goliath. Haye weighed in at 217 pounds, almost 100 pounds less than his opponent. Haye said about Valuev: "He is the ugliest thing I have ever seen. I have watched Lord of the Rings and films with strange-looking people, but for a human being to look like he does is pretty shocking."

Haye beat Valuev in a reserved display of accuracy and efficiency, countering Valuev's misses, jabbing and circling his much larger opponent. Haye came close to knocking Valuev down in the final round with a hard left hand, which made Valuev stumble. Haye won a majority decision (MD) with scores of 114–114, 116–112, and 116–112. Haye is the first and currently only boxer in the history of the sport to be seven stone or more lighter than an opponent in a world title fight and still come out victorious. The fight garnered 469,000 buys on Sky Sports Box Office, which saw Haye receive a payday of £2.1 million.

==== Haye vs. Ruiz ====
On 26 January 2010, former WBA champion John Ruiz was announced as Haye's first title defence on 3 April at the M.E.N Arena in Manchester, live on Sky Box Office. Ruiz, ranked as the number one contender by the WBA was initially in line to fight Valuev, however agree to step aside. Ruiz was unhappy at the fight being staged in the UK and not Las Vegas, as he thought it would be. Ruiz did not show up at the official press conference. Haye defeated Ruiz in his first WBA title defence by TKO in the ninth round after knocking Ruiz down four times during the fight. This was only the second time Ruiz had been stopped, after being knocked out in round one by David Tua 14 years prior to facing Haye. After the fight, Haye immediately called on both Klitschko brothers, after claiming their recent challengers Eddie Chambers and Chris Arreola were "a disgrace to boxing." Haye earned a £1 million purse for the bout.

==== Haye vs. Harrison ====
It was confirmed on 7 September 2010 that Haye would fight Audley Harrison on 13 November 2010 at the Manchester Arena. The press conference for the bout became heated, leading to the two fighters swearing at each other on live television. On 13 November 2010, Haye defeated Harrison with one minute, seven seconds remaining of the third round by TKO. Southpaw Harrison landed one punch during the entire fight. He staggered to his feet after being knocked down, only for Haye to immediately pounce right back on him, hitting him with another flurry of punches. The referee intervened and ended the bout. Haye earned £4.2 million for the fight and Harrison had a purse of £1.5 million. The fight was bought by 223,000 households in the UK on Sky Box Office. An investigation took place after the fight and Harrison's purse was withheld, due to his underwhelming performance. After listening to Harrison's explanation, the British Boxing Board of Control decided to release his purse.

Haye's plans to unify the heavyweight division took a major setback in January 2011 when it was revealed that Tomas Adamek would fight one of the Klitschko brothers in September 2011, before his planned retirement in October of that year. However, in April 2011, it was announced that Haye and Wladimir Klitschko had agreed to meet at the Imtech Arena in Hamburg on 2 July 2011.

==== Haye vs. Wladimir Klitschko ====
Haye vs. Klitschko was the first heavyweight unification fight since Klitschko and Sultan Ibragimov fought back in 2008, when Klitschko beat Ibragimov and added the WBO title to his IBF title. Klitschko defeated Haye by unanimous decision (UD) to become the unified WBA (Super), IBF, WBO, and The Ring heavyweight champion. Klitschko and Haye agreed to a 50–50 split of the purse and Haye was allotted 7,000 seats at the venue. Klitschko dominated the fight, statistically outlanding Haye nearly 2 to 1. The three judges scored it 117–109, 118–108, and 116–110 all in favour of Klitschko. Haye revealed afterwards that he had a broken toe. Both Klitschko and Haye reportedly earned $32 million each for the bout.

=== Retirement talks and return ===
BBC chief Charlie Smith told The Sun on 11 October 2011 that Haye had informed him that he would not be renewing his boxing licence, thus retiring from the sport. Haye has had a long-standing plan to retire early. After the Harrison fight Haye said his plans to retire before he is 31 had not altered: "I will have achieved what I wanted to achieve – undisputed cruiserweight champion, unify the heavyweight division and then call it a day." In December 2010, during the negotiations to fight Klitschko, Haye said if the fight did not happen, "I'll just have to accept that becoming the WBA champion was enough and move on with my life. That'll be 20 years of getting punched in the face, which is a long enough time. I set my goals and achieved them so unifying the titles is the cherry on the cake but if it doesn't happen it wasn't meant to be and I've just got to get on with my life".

An authorised biography by Elliot Worsell, Making Haye, was published in late 2011, chronicling Haye's career from its beginnings, when Haye and Worsell befriended one another, up until the aftermath of the Wladimir Klitschko fight.

==== Vitali Klitschko negotiations ====
Haye put retirement on hold and was in negotiations for a possible bout with WBC heavyweight champion Vitali Klitschko on 3 March 2012. However, Klitschko went on to schedule a fight with Derek Chisora on 18 February 2012, which he won by decision. Following the fight there was a fracas between Chisora and Haye, who had attended as a spectator, leading to speculation that Haye might come out of retirement to fight Chisora. However, on 21 February, Haye confirmed that he would only come out of retirement to fight Klitschko. On 8 May, Haye signed on to face Chisora on 14 July.

==== Haye vs. Chisora ====
Haye attended the 2012 WBC heavyweight title fight in which Vitali Klitschko defeated Derek Chisora. Following the fight, Haye began heckling the post-fight press conference, leading to a violent brawl with Chisora and his entourage. Klitschko's manager Bernd Boente said "with the bad experience we've had with British fighters we will now look for other countries". He then told Haye from the dais "You had an offer, you didn't accept it, now you are out. You are out. You cannot talk yourself back into the fight, you have no belts." Chisora then called out Haye, but Haye dismissed Chisora as "a loser".

Chisora taunted Haye by asking him "How's your toe David? How's your toe?". Chisora challenged Haye to tell him that to his face and approached Haye sparking a melee with Haye throwing the first punch with what appeared to be a glass bottle in his hand, as the brawl progressed Haye was seen swinging a camera tripod. After order was restored, a furious Chisora stated multiple times that he would "shoot" Haye and claimed Haye "glassed" him. Haye's former manager Adam Booth emerged from the fracas with a facial wound and Chisora suggested to Booth that Haye hit him with a bottle by mistake while Booth insisted it was one of Chisora's entourage that had hit him with a bottle. During an interview at the Haye vs. Chisora press conference, Booth was asked "how did you end up with a cut on your head?" to which he replied "David hit me with a tripod" but also added "he bought me a new S-Class Mercedes as an apology".

On 8 May 2012, Haye and his promotion team announced that he would fight against Chisora at Boleyn Ground, Upton Park, London on 14 July 2012. The announcement caused controversy as neither held a British Boxing Licence, and so had agreed a licence deal with the Luxembourg Boxing Association. Seen as a direct attempt to undermine the British Boxing Board of Control, it meant that fights could take place in Britain even if a boxer was facing disciplinary action.

Haye won the fight with a fifth-round stoppage in front of over 40,000 spectators. Knocked to the floor in the fifth round, receiving a count of eight, Chisora recovered only to be floored again in the same round. Referee Luis Pabon decided Chisora was unable to continue, signalling the end of the contest.

==== Fury talks and fallout ====
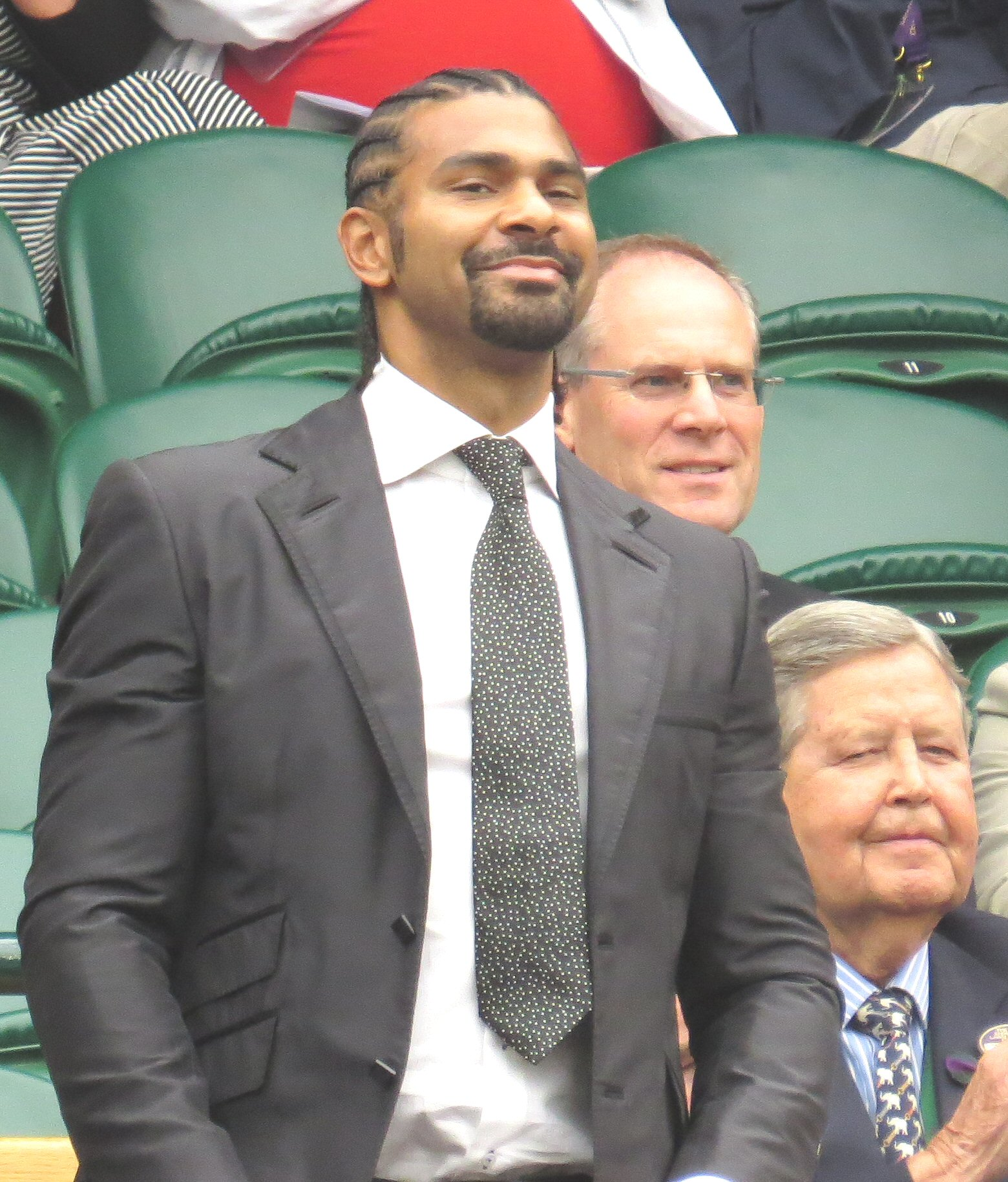
Haye at Wimbledon, 2014

Haye was due to fight Manuel Charr at Manchester Arena on 29 June 2013. However, the fight was called off because Haye had suffered an injury. Haye later arranged a fight with Tyson Fury at the same venue on 28 September 2013. However, a week before the fight, Haye sustained a cut to the head which required several stitches, so yet again the fight was postponed. It was originally rescheduled for 8 February 2014. However Haye dropped out of the fight on 17 November 2013 after shoulder surgery. Fury, meanwhile, believed that Haye was making excuses because he didn't want the fight, with Fury himself saying "I'm absolutely furious but in all honesty this is exactly what I expected. Everyone knows I was very suspicious when he pulled out the first time and this confirms to me that he's always been afraid of me and never wanted this fight." Aside from training camp expenses, Haye also cost Fury his positions in the world rankings including an IBF final eliminator bout which would have made him mandatory for a shot at the world title. Although doctors advised Haye to retire from boxing, he never officially announced his retirement.

=== Comeback ===
In 2015, Haye switched trainers from Adam Booth to Shane McGuigan, son of former WBA featherweight champion Barry McGuigan.

==== Haye vs. de Mori ====
On 24 November 2015, Haye and his new promotion and management team, Salter Brothers Entertainment, announced his comeback fight against WBA #10 ranked heavyweight Mark de Mori. The fight took place on 16 January 2016 (marketed by Salter Brothers Entertainment as "Haye Day") at The O2 Arena in London, and was Haye's first fight in more than three years since stopping Chisora in 2012. Coming into the fight, Australian De Mori had lost only once in 33 career bouts and 26 of his 29 victories had come via KO, albeit against limited opposition. It was announced on 6 January 2016 that Haye and the Salter Brothers had struck a deal for the comeback fight to be shown on free-to-air entertainment channel Dave, the largest non-PSB broadcaster in the UK and the channel's first ever live sport broadcast. In a world's first, Salter Brothers Entertainment also partnered with YouTube to live-stream the event outside of the UK to a global audience for free.

Haye came in at the highest weight of his career, appearing to have gained a lot of muscle mass since the lay off. He employed much less movement than in previous fights and came forward methodically, knocking out de Mori in 113 seconds of the first round. The broadcast of the fight on Dave was the most successful show in the history of the channel after achieving an audience of over 3 million viewers, experiencing a higher share of the UK audience than Channel 4 and was only one per cent behind ITV. The event was the first ever boxing match to be shot and streamed live in 360 and VR via partnership between Salter Brothers Entertainment and IM360. A large number of celebrities were in attendance; Sigma performed an opening concert and A-lister guests ringside included Benedict Cumberbatch and Idris Elba.

==== Haye vs. Gjergjaj ====
On 26 January 2016, Haye announced his next fight, (marketed as "Haye Day 2") would take place on 21 May 2016 at The O2 in London in Haye's pursuit of reclaiming and unifying the heavyweight world titles. His opponent was the little known Swiss fighter Arnold Gjergjaj. During the press conference announcing the fight, Shannon Briggs confronted Haye calling him out. Haye did not agree to fight Briggs immediately but instead offered him the chance to fight on his undercard, promising that he would fight him next if he was victorious. Briggs agreed to this arrangement and stopped Emilio Ezequiel Zarate in the first round.

Haye floored Gjergjaj with a right hand inside the first 30 seconds of the fight, and then proceeded drop him again with a left jab and a third time with a chopping right in the second round before the fight was waved off by the referee. For a second time Haye used free-to-air channel Dave to broadcast the fight, but this time it was promoted by Haye himself with Hayemaker Promotions and not by Salter Brothers Entertainment. The fight peaked at 2.5 million viewers. The fight was also a success on social media platforms Facebook and Twitter as #HayeDay overtook the #FACupFinal to become the UK top trend.

Despite winning on the undercard, a fight between Briggs and Haye didn't materialize. Briggs continued to call out Haye, asking him to honour his end of the agreement. Briggs also chased Haye down in Brooklyn when both were in attendance for the Frampton vs. Santa Cruz fight. In October, Haye spoke out about the fight not taking place due to the fact that Briggs wanted the fight to be on ppv, "Because the fight can't happen on pay-per-view ... I like people thinking I'm running from him and ducking him because when I do get in the ring with him, which I really think I will do, I think it will make it a bigger fight. But at the moment the fight can't happen because he will only fight me if the fight is on pay-per-view. I would fight him on [UK terrestrial channel] DAVE, but he doesn't want to do that."

==== Haye vs. Bellew ====
Following his win over BJ Flores in October, WBC cruiserweight champion Tony Bellew immediately hit out a verbal assault on rival Haye, who was ringside, repeating he's next. Referring to Haye as 'Sideshow Bob', Bellew carried on the verbal assault in the post-fight interview using profanity and taunting Haye, stating he has been 'conning the British public' since he announced his comeback. Bellew's promoter, Eddie Hearn, claimed the fight could take place at heavyweight or at cruiserweight for Bellew's WBC title. On 25 November 2016, Hearn announced on Twitter that Haye and Bellew would face each other in a heavyweight bout on 4 March 2017 at The O2 Arena, London. The fight was shown on Sky Box Office and was Bellew's first heavyweight fight.

At the first press conference on 30 November, a fight broke out as Haye and Bellew went face to face and it appeared on the replay that Haye had managed to land a left hook on Bellew, leaving a mark. Both fighters were then separated before going their own ways. On 3 March 2017, Haye weighed 224.9 pounds, heavier than Bellew who came in at 213lbs, a career high.

After months of trash talk back and forth the two met in the ring. The bout started as a stalemate until the sixth round, when Haye injured his achilles tendon, causing him to fall twice. Bellew then took control of the fight as Haye opted to continue. Bellew knocked Haye down and out of the ropes late in the eleventh round. Haye managed to make it to his feet, but his corner threw in the towel, giving Bellew a TKO win. Bellew credited Haye for his bravery, while Haye refused to blame his injury and stated that Bellew was "by far the better fighter", though stated that he wanted a rematch. Haye was taken to the hospital following the bout but was released the next morning. It was revealed that Haye had ruptured his right achilles tendon and underwent surgery. At the time of stoppage, Bellew led on all three scorecards 96–93. With a 60–40 split of the £7 million purse, Haye earned £4.2 million while Bellew earned £2.8 million, his biggest purse by far. It was reported that the fight generated 890,000 buys on Sky Sports Box Office.

Despite the loss, Haye was widely praised for his performance in fighting on whilst severely injured. As Kevin Mitchell of The Guardian newspaper summed up of the fight:

Haye, staggering around the ring like a Saturday night drunk, went down swinging, his right ankle strapped in the ninth then unstrapped, his aged body sagging under every assault.....Even when thrashed through the ropes at the end, Haye clambered back and was willing to continue.... It will not seem so to him as he contemplates the fading of his days, but this was Haye's finest night."

==== Change of trainer ====
On 3 June 2017 Haye and McGuigan both announced that they would no longer work together. It was said that they had reached a mutual agreement and parted on good terms. Some rumours indicated that McGuigan had urged Haye to retire, which eventually caused the split. On 6 July, Haye announced that he had hired Cuban Ismael Salas as his new trainer. Salas, known for working with Jorge Linares, Guillermo Rigondeaux and Nonito Donaire, stated that he believed he could lead Haye to another world title reign.

==== Haye vs. Bellew II ====
On 12 July 2017, Haye confirmed that he had begun strengthening his ankle and he would slowly start training for his next fight which would likely take place in December 2017. On 24 July, negotiations had begun for a rematch between Haye and Bellew to take place in December 2017, although they were far from an agreement. Bellew made Haye an offer of his preferred purse, which would reportedly make the rematch worth around £20 million. On 3 August, Hearn stated a rematch between Bellew and Haye was 'virtually dead', due to both fighters believing they are the A-side and have the right to demand ring walks, poster position, changing rooms and split of purse. On 6 September, Hearn stated a deal could be made within seven days. According to Bellew's trainer, David Coldwell, both Haye and Bellew had held positive talks and looking more likely to agree to a fight, as long they stay on the same page and agree to the same terms. On 19 September, Haye agreed all the terms and tweeted Bellew to sign the contract. He said, "It's taken months of negotiating but teams have finally agreed all terms for Haye-Bellew 2. Will Bellew put pen to paper?" The fight was reported to take place on Sunday 17 December 2017. Hearn stated the fight was not a done deal, but he had hoped to confirm the fight within a week. Bellew replied the following day, tweeting, "I OBLIGE YOU @mrdavidhaye , happy? Now leave me alone with my family please. I'll see you soon enough!" The fight was officially confirmed on 29 September for the fight to take place at The O2 Arena in London. Bellew claimed the rematch wasn't personal anymore, just business and hoping to dedicate a win to his late brother-in-law, who had died in August. Haye stated that Bellew wouldn't win the lottery twice. Like the first fight, it was scheduled to be shown live on Sky Sports Box Office.

On 20 November, it was reported that Haye had injured his arm and forced to pull out of the fight. In a statement, Haye said, "I am devastated to announce my much-anticipated rematch against Tony Bellew has been postponed until March 24 or May 5, subject to scheduling." It was believed that the injury occurred during a stair conditioning session. Bellew was said to be disappointed with Haye's announcement, but stated he may take an interim bout. The fight was rescheduled for 5 May 2018. Haye weighed 220.2 pounds, 4 pounds lighter than the first fight. Bellew also came in lighter at 210.4 pounds.

Bellew knocked Haye down three times, eventually winning the fight via TKO in round five. Haye started the opening two rounds using his jab, leaving a mark around Bellew's right eye. As round three started, both boxers started getting closer and unloading power shots. As Haye started to step backwards around the ring, Bellew landed clean, dropping Haye. At this point it appeared Haye may have injured his ankle, with the Sky commentary team mentioning this, as well as the post-fight interviewer. Haye later denied he was injured. Bellew then dropped Haye again with a hard combination. Bellew came out cautiously in round four, still wary of Haye's power. In round five, both fighters traded punches, but it was a left hook from Bellew that dropped Haye for a third time. Haye managed to beat the count again, not long before Bellew started unloading a barrage of punches. With Haye against the ropes, referee Howard Foster stepped in at 2 minutes, 14 seconds, giving Bellew his second stoppage win over Haye. Immediately after the fight Haye congratulated Bellew on the win. Haye stated he would review the tapes and see what went wrong. According to CompuBox Stats, Haye landed 42 of 189 punches thrown (22%), only 6 being power punches and Bellew landed 70 of his 219 thrown (32%), with 34 being power punches. Both boxers earned a minimum purse of £2.5 million for the fight, which would likely increase based on TV revenue and PPV shares.

=== Final retirement ===
On 12 June 2018, Haye released a statement via social media announcing his retirement. In the statement, Haye spoke about his career from start to finish, all the injuries he suffered, rehab and also revealed he had spinal surgery in March 2015.

== Exhibition bout ==
=== Haye vs. Fournier ===
In August 2021, Haye announced that he would be making a one-fight comeback on 11 September 2021 in a bout against his friend, businessman Joe Fournier, on the undercard of the Triller pay-per-view bout between Oscar De La Hoya and Vitor Belfort at the Staples Center in Los Angeles, California. Haye explained in a statement on his website: "This whole fight between us came into existence when at dinner with a group in Mykonos we were asked who would win in a fight between us." He detailed that he was unhappy with Fournier being "deadly serious stating he would win in a fight today", and confirmed that he "remain[s] happily retired from boxing, with no intentions to make a traditional comeback to challenge the monsters of the division but am fit and ready to prove my point against my overconfident billionaire buddy." Haye asserted that he will receive a larger payday from his bout with Fournier than his first Sky Sports Box Office bout against Tony Bellew in 2017, calling it "crazy dough".

On 31 August, it emerged that the fight would be classified as an exhibition bout due to a ruling by the California State Athletic Commission, thus the result of the fight would have no bearing on Haye or Fournier's professional records. On the night, Haye easily outboxed Fournier over 8 rounds, and knocked him down once, to earn a unanimous decision victory with scores of 79–72, 80–71 and 79–72. In his post-fight interview, he called out undefeated WBC and The Ring heavyweight champion Tyson Fury.

== Promotional career ==
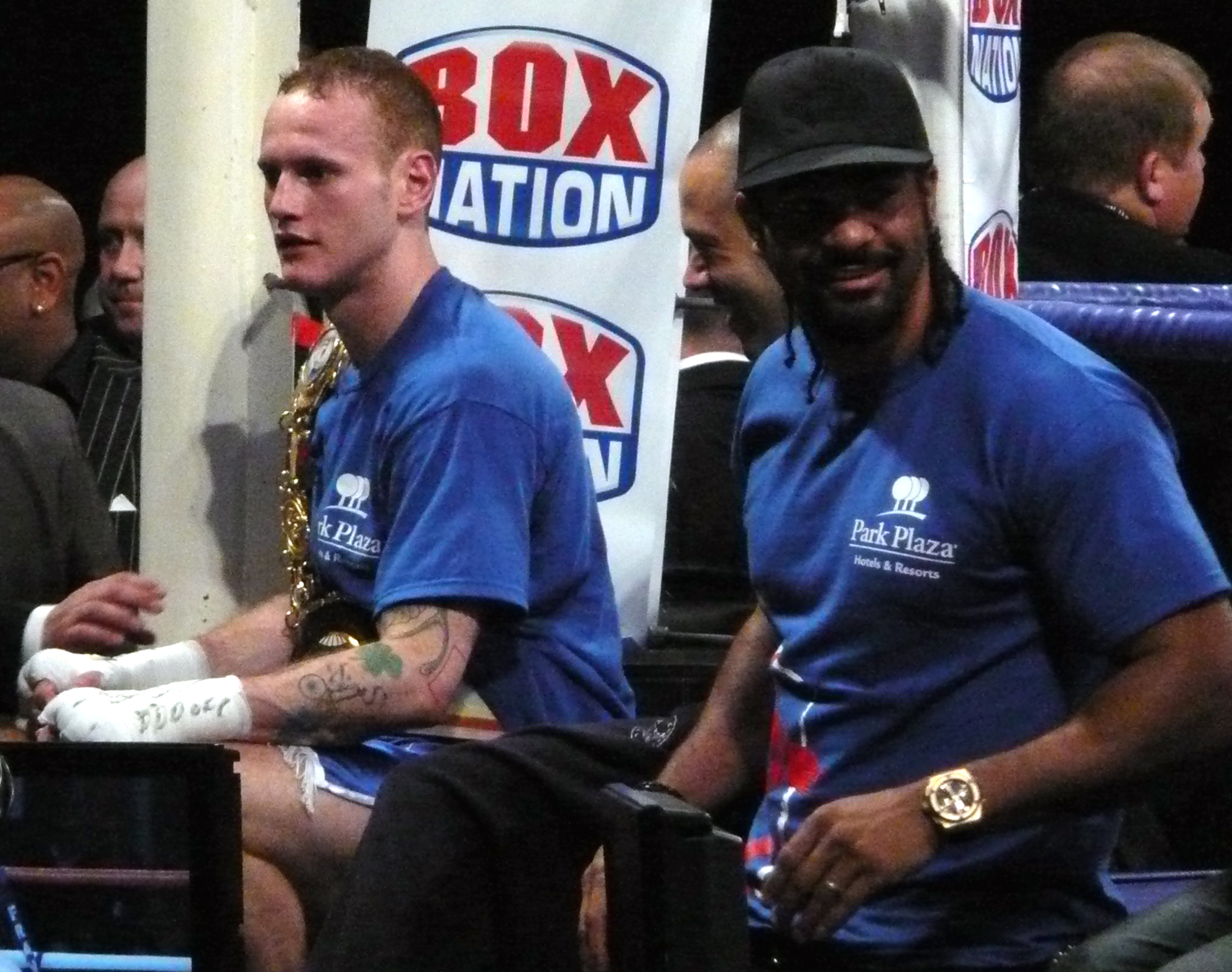
Haye with Adam Booth (centre) and George Groves, 2011. Haye promoted Groves from 2008 to 2009.

On 20 January 2017, Haye announced he would combine his Hayemaker promotions with Richard Schaefer's Ringstar Sport to create Hayemaker Ringstar, which would be based in the UK and rival Eddie Hearn's Matchroom Sport and Frank Warren's Queensberry Promotions. They would also promote shows in the US. Shaefer stated in a press release that he had intended to promote in the UK for some years and spoke of his excitement to be in partnership with Haye.

At an official press conference on 12 July 2017, Hayemaker Ringstar announced they had agreed a TV rights deal with the biggest multichannel broadcaster in the UK, UKTV, for entertainment channel Dave. The deal would be for 3 years which would show five fight nights per year. Hayemaker Ringstar also introduced its latest signings, Olympics silver medalist, heavyweight Joe Joyce, Olympian Qais Ashfaq, European champion Willy Hutchinson and former 10-time world kickboxing champion Michael 'Venom' Page.

On 6 September 2017, an official announcement was made for the first boxing event which would take place at Indigo, The O2 Arena in London on 20 October 2017. Haye confirmed that Joe Joyce would headline the card, making his debut against experienced former WBO Asia Pacific champion Ian Lewison (12–3, 8 KOs).

== Media career ==
Haye created his own documentary reality show, David Haye versus, under his production company Hayemaker Productions, which was broadcast on Sky 1 from 28 to 29 June 2011. It featured him training and in conversation with Ricky Gervais, Justin Bieber, Michael McIntyre, Dizzee Rascal and Mickey Rourke.

In November 2012, he took part in the twelfth series of I'm a Celebrity...Get Me Out of Here!, in which he finished third.

In 2026, he was one of the 'All Stars' contestants in series 2 of I'm a Celebrity... South Africa, that aired on ITV1 on 6 April 2026.

Television
Year	Title	Role	Notes
2010	The Graham Norton Show	Guest	Season 8, Episode 5
2018	The Big Narstie Show	Guest	Season 1, Episode 5
2018	Peng Life	Self	Season 1, Episode 3

== Personal life ==
Haye lives in the Beckenham area of London. He is polyamorous.

Haye married make-up artist Natasha in 2008, with whom he has two sons. After eight years of marriage, they divorced in 2016.

Haye is a fan of Millwall FC. In addition to being a native British citizen, he gained Northern Cypriot citizenship in 2010, but later relinquished it. His training camp was based in Ozanköy from 2005 until his split with trainer Adam Booth, and his former training site now serves as an amateur boxing gym. He sometimes wore the Northern Cypriot flag on his shorts alongside the English, United Kingdom, and Jamaican flags.

Haye became a vegan in 2014, stating, "I watched a TV documentary about how animals are farmed, killed and prepared for us to eat. I saw all those cows and pigs and realised I couldn't be a part of it any more. It was horrible. I did some research to make sure I could still obtain enough protein to fight and, once satisfied that I could, I stopped. I'll never go back." He launched his own range of vegan protein powder later that year. In 2016, he appeared in a promotional video by PETA called David Haye: Vegan for Animals.

== Honours ==
Haye was selected for the final 10 shortlist for the 2010 BBC Sports Personality of the Year Award for his performances against John Ruiz and Audley Harrison.

== Professional boxing record ==
32 fights	28 wins	4 losses
By knockout	26	3
By decision	2	1

No.	Result	Record	Opponent	Type	Round, time	Date	Location	Notes
32	Loss	28–4	Tony Bellew	TKO	5 (12), 2:14	5 May 2018	The O2 Arena, London, England	
31	Loss	28–3	Tony Bellew	TKO	11 (12), 2:16	4 Mar 2017	The O2 Arena, London, England	
30	Win	28–2	Arnold Gjergjaj	TKO	2 (10), 1:35	21 May 2016	The O2 Arena, London, England	
29	Win	27–2	Mark de Mori	TKO	1 (10), 2:11	16 Jan 2016	The O2 Arena, London, England	
28	Win	26–2	Derek Chisora	TKO	5 (10), 2:51	14 Jul 2012	Boleyn Ground, London, England	Won vacant WBA Inter-Continental and WBO International heavyweight titles
27	Loss	25–2	Wladimir Klitschko	UD	12	2 Jul 2011	Imtech Arena, Hamburg, Germany	Lost WBA heavyweight title; For IBF, WBO, IBO, and The Ring heavyweight titles
26	Win	25–1	Audley Harrison	TKO	3 (12), 1:53	13 Nov 2010	MEN Arena, Manchester, England	Retained WBA heavyweight title
25	Win	24–1	John Ruiz	TKO	9 (12), 2:01	3 Apr 2010	MEN Arena, Manchester, England	Retained WBA heavyweight title
24	Win	23–1	Nikolai Valuev	MD	12	7 Nov 2009	Nuremberg Arena, Nuremberg, Germany	Won WBA heavyweight title
23	Win	22–1	Monte Barrett	TKO	5 (10), 1:28	15 Nov 2008	The O2 Arena, London, England	
22	Win	21–1	Enzo Maccarinelli	TKO	2 (12), 2:04	8 Mar 2008	The O2 Arena, London, England	Retained WBA (Undisputed), WBC, and The Ring cruiserweight titles; Won WBO cruiserweight title
21	Win	20–1	Jean-Marc Mormeck	TKO	7 (12), 1:54	10 Nov 2007	Palais des sports Marcel-Cerdan, Paris, France	Won WBA (Unified), WBC, and The Ring cruiserweight titles
20	Win	19–1	Tomasz Bonin	TKO	1 (12), 1:45	27 Apr 2007	Wembley Arena, London, England	
19	Win	18–1	Giacobbe Fragomeni	TKO	9 (12), 1:29	17 Nov 2006	York Hall, London, England	Retained European cruiserweight title
18	Win	17–1	Ismail Abdoul	UD	12	21 Jul 2006	Leisure Centre, Altrincham, England	Retained European cruiserweight title
17	Win	16–1	Lasse Johansen	TKO	8 (12), 2:08	24 Mar 2006	York Hall, London, England	Retained European cruiserweight title
16	Win	15–1	Alexander Gurov	KO	1 (12), 0:45	16 Dec 2005	Leisure Centre, Bracknell, England	Won European cruiserweight title
15	Win	14–1	Vincenzo Rossitto	TKO	2 (10), 2:55	14 Oct 2005	Leisure Centre, Huddersfield, England	
14	Win	13–1	Glen Kelly	TKO	2 (10), 1:09	4 Mar 2005	Magna Science Adventure Centre, Rotherham, England	
13	Win	12–1	Garry Delaney	RTD	3 (6), 3:00	21 Jan 2005	Brentford Fountain Leisure Centre, London, England	
12	Win	11–1	Valeri Semiskur	KO	1 (6), 1:36	10 Dec 2004	Hillsborough Leisure Centre, Sheffield, England	
11	Loss	10–1	Carl Thompson	TKO	5 (12), 2:53	10 Sep 2004	Wembley Arena, London, England	For IBO cruiserweight title
10	Win	10–0	Arthur Williams	TKO	3 (8), 2:46	12 May 2004	Rivermead Leisure Centre, Reading, England	
9	Win	9–0	Hastings Rasani	TKO	1 (6), 2:17	20 Mar 2004	Wembley Arena, London, England	
8	Win	8–0	Tony Dowling	TKO	1 (10), 1:35	14 Nov 2003	York Hall, London, England	Won English cruiserweight title
7	Win	7–0	Lolenga Mock	TKO	4 (6), 2:30	26 Sep 2003	Rivermead Leisure Centre, Reading, England	
6	Win	6–0	Greg Scott-Briggs	KO	1 (6), 2:04	1 Aug 2003	York Hall, London, England	
5	Win	5–0	Vance Winn	TKO	1 (6), 0:54	15 Jul 2003	Playboy Mansion, Beverly Hills, California, US	
4	Win	4–0	Phil Day	TKO	2 (4), 2:09	18 Mar 2003	Rivermead Leisure Centre, Reading, England	
3	Win	3–0	Roger Bowden	TKO	1 (6), 2:42	4 Mar 2003	Seville Hotel, Miami, Florida, US	
2	Win	2–0	Saber Zairi	TKO	4 (4), 0:54	24 Jan 2003	Ponds Forge, Sheffield, England	
1	Win	1–0	Tony Booth	RTD	2 (4), 3:00	8 Dec 2002	York Hall, London, England	

== Exhibition boxing record ==
1 fight	1 win	0 losses
By decision	1	0

No.	Result	Record	Opponent	Type	Round, time	Date	Location	Notes
1	Win	1–0	Joe Fournier	UD	8	11 Sep 2021	Seminole Hard Rock Hotel & Casino, Hollywood, Florida, US	

== Titles in boxing ==
=== Major world titles ===
- WBA (Unified) & (Undisputed) cruiserweight champion (200 lbs)
- WBC cruiserweight champion (200 lbs)
- WBO cruiserweight champion (200 lbs)
- WBA heavyweight champion (200+ lbs)

=== The Ring magazine titles ===
- The Ring cruiserweight champion (200 lbs)

=== Regional/International titles ===
- English cruiserweight champion (200 lbs)
- EBU cruiserweight champion (200 lbs)
- WBA Inter-Continental heavyweight champion (200+ lbs)
- WBO International heavyweight champion (200+ lbs)

== Viewership ==
=== International ===
Date	Fight	Billing	Region(s)	Viewership (est.)	Source(s)
2 July 2011	Wladimir Klitschko vs. David Haye	The Talk Ends Now	Worldwide	500,000,000	
	Total viewership		Worldwide	500,000,000	

=== Germany ===
Date	Fight	Billing	Network	Viewership (avg.)	Source(s)
7 November 2009	Nikolai Valuev vs. David Haye	David vs. Goliath	Das Erste	7,340,000	
13 November 2010	David Haye vs. Audley Harrison	Best Of Enemies	Das Erste	4,170,000	
2 July 2011	Wladimir Klitschko vs. David Haye	The Talk Ends Now	RTL Television	15,560,000	
	Total viewership			27,070,000	

=== United Kingdom ===
Date	Fight	Billing	Network	Viewership (avg.)	Source(s)
16 January 2016	David Haye vs. Mark de Mori	Haye vs. de Mori	Dave	1,350,000	
21 May 2016	David Haye vs. Arnold Gjergjaj	Haye vs. Gjergjaj	Dave	1,073,000	
	Total viewership			2,423,000	

==== Pay-per-view bouts ====
Date	Fight	Billing	Network	Pay-per-view buys	Source
7 November 2009	Nikolai Valuev vs. David Haye	David vs. Goliath	Sky Box Office	469,000	
3 April 2010	David Haye vs. John Ruiz	Lord Of The Ring	Sky Box Office	253,000	
13 November 2010	David Haye vs. Audley Harrison	Best Of Enemies	Sky Box Office	304,000	
2 July 2011	Wladimir Klitschko vs. David Haye	The Talk Ends Now	Sky Box Office	1,197,000	
14 July 2012	David Haye vs. Derek Chisora	Licensed to Thrill	BoxNation	300,000	
4 March 2017	David Haye vs. Tony Bellew	Grudge Match	Sky Box Office	1,515,000	
5 May 2018	Tony Bellew vs. David Haye II	Repeat Or Revenge	Sky Box Office	1,048,000	
	Total sales			4,786,000	

== See also ==
- List of world cruiserweight boxing champions
- List of world heavyweight boxing champions
- List of WBA world champions
- List of WBC world champions
- List of WBO world champions
- List of The Ring world champions

== Notes ==
Sporting positions
Regional boxing titles
Inaugural champion	English cruiserweight champion 14 November 2003 – September 2004; Vacated	Vacant Title next held by Dean Francis
Preceded by Alexander Gurov	European cruiserweight champion 16 December 2005 – June 2007; Vacated	Vacant Title next held by Vincenzo Cantatore
Vacant Title last held by Robert Helenius	WBA Inter-Continental heavyweight champion 14 July 2012 – August 2014; Vacated	Vacant Title next held by Lucas Browne
New title	WBO International heavyweight champion 14 July 2012 – July 2013; Vacated	Vacant Title next held by Derek Chisora
World boxing titles
Preceded by Jean-Marc Mormeck	WBA cruiserweight champion Unified title 10 November 2007 – 19 June 2008; Undisputed title in January–May 2008; Vacated	Vacant Title next held by Denis Lebedev
Preceded by Jean-Marc Mormeck	WBC cruiserweight champion 10 November 2007 – 12 May 2008; Vacated	Vacant Title next held by Giacobbe Fragomeni
Preceded by Jean-Marc Mormeck	The Ring cruiserweight champion 10 November 2007 – 30 June 2008; Vacated	Vacant Title next held by Tomasz Adamek
Preceded by Enzo Maccarinelli	WBO cruiserweight champion 8 March 2008 – 14 July 2008; Vacated	Vacant Title next held by Victor Emilio Ramírez
Preceded by Nikolai Valuev	WBA heavyweight champion 7 November 2009 – 2 July 2011; Failed to win Unified title	Succeeded by Wladimir Klitschko as Unified champion
