= Shane McGuigan =

British boxing trainer

- Born: Shane James McGuigan; 1988 (age 36–37); Milton Keynes, England
- Partner: Taylor West
- Children: 2
- Father: Barry McGuigan
- Family: Pat McGuigan (grandfather); Nika McGuigan (sister)

Shane James McGuigan (born November 1988) is a British and Irish boxing trainer. His gym is based in South West London.

== Background ==
Born in Milton Keynes, England, McGuigan is the son of Irish former featherweight world champion Barry McGuigan. He has two brothers and a late sister, Nika. McGuigan grew up in rural Kent near Whitstable and went to boarding school at Millfield. He is dyslexic. At 14, he became interested in boxing, and his father took him to an amateur boxing club in Faversham.

McGuigan is married to Taylor West. They have two sons (born 2022 and 2024).

== Notable fighters ==
- Chantelle Cameron (2017–2019)
- Luke Campbell (2018–2021)
- Conrad Cummings (2014–2017)
- Daniel Dubois (2021–2023)
- Anthony Fowler (2020–2022)
- Carl Frampton (2013–2017)
- George Groves (2015–2018)
- David Haye (2016–2017)
- Lee McGregor (2017–2018)
- Lawrence Okolie (2019–2023)
- Chris Billam-Smith (2017–)
- Josh Taylor (2015–2020)
