= Tomasz Bonin =

Polish boxer

Personal information
- Nicknames: Bull; The Polish Hammer
- Nationality: Polish
- Born: 9 November 1973 (age 52) Tczew, Poland
- Height: 1.86 m (6 ft 1 in)
- Weight: Heavyweight

Boxing career
- Stance: Orthodox

Boxing record
- Total fights: 44
- Wins: 41
- Win by KO: 22
- Losses: 3

Tomasz "The Polish Hammer" Bonin (born 9 November 1973) is a Polish heavyweight boxer.

== Career ==
Bonin has a professional record of 41-3 but was KO'd twice when stepping up. He won his first 26 professional fights, winning the Polish International Heavyweight title and subsequently defending it on 3 occasions, as well as beating boxers such as Garing Lane, Gary Winmon, Dirk Wallyn, Robert Šulgan, Asmir Vojnovic and Antoine Palatis. His first loss was to Audley Harrison when he challenged for the World Boxing Foundation (WBFo) heavyweight title in 2004.

He then fought his way up to rank 11 by the WBC, then in 2007 lost to David Haye, who dropped Bonin 3 times in the first round and a 'slip' before the referee called an end to the fight for Bonin's safety. He was then dropped to rank 25 by the WBC.

He regularly uses the block smash move that he renamed 'The Polish Hammer' before his bout against David Haye.

After his fight with Haye he went 4-1 in his next five fights with the loss coming to Andrzej Wawrzyk.
