= Jean-Marc Mormeck =

French boxer (born 1972)

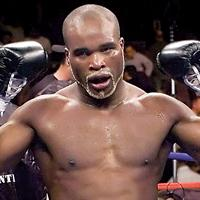
- Mormeck in 2005

Personal information
- Nickname: The Marksman
- Nationality: French
- Born: Jean-Marc Gilbert Mormeck; 3 June 1972 (age 54) Pointe-à-Pitre, Guadeloupe, France
- Height: 1.81 m (5 ft 11 in)
- Weight: Light-heavyweight; Cruiserweight; Heavyweight

Boxing career
- Reach: 188 cm (74 in)
- Stance: Orthodox

Boxing record
- Total fights: 43
- Wins: 37
- Win by KO: 23
- Losses: 6

Jean-Marc Gilbert Mormeck (born 3 June 1972) is a French former professional boxer who competed from 1995 to 2014. He is a two-time unified world cruiserweight champion, having held the WBA, WBC and The Ring world titles twice between 2005 and 2007. He was the first boxer to hold unified cruiserweight title since Evander Holyfield in 1988, and the first fighter to hold The Ring cruiserweight title since Carlos De León in 1987. He was ranked by BoxRec as the world's top 10 cruiserweight from 2001 to 2005 and in 2007, and was ranked No.1 in 2003 and 2004. Mormeck also challenged for the unified world heavyweight title in 2012.

== Early life ==
Mormeck was born in Pointe-à-Pitre, Guadeloupe as an only child to Fulbert and Sonia Mormeck. When he was 6, he and his family moved to Paris, France, where he still lives. Mormeck engaged himself in football and Muay Thai as an amateur. After watching some boxing matches on television, he became inspired to excel in it.

== Professional career ==
=== 1990–1998: early career ===
He fought as an amateur in 1990 and turned professional in 1995. Early in his career, Mormeck lost 2 minor four-round bouts on points but kept winning for years afterwards. On 10 November 1998, Mormeck won the French light heavyweight title with a unanimous decision win over Alain Simon. He defended that title three times before relinquishing it.

=== 2002–2006: first world title and unification bouts ===
Later, Mormeck captured the WBA cruiserweight title by a 9th-round technical knockout win over Virgil Hill on 23 February 2002. Following three defenses with wins over Dale Brown, Alexander Gurov and Virgil Hill again, he added the WBC cruiserweight crown to his collection on 2 April 2005, by way of unanimous decision over Wayne Braithwaite.

However, Mormeck lost his WBA and WBC cruiserweight titles to O'Neil Bell after being knocked out in the 10th round. This bout, on 7 January 2006, was for the undisputed (WBA/WBC/IBF) cruiserweight championship.

=== 2007: regaining cruiserweight titles ===
In their rematch, Mormeck regained the WBA and WBC titles back from Bell (Bell lost the IBF title over a dispute from the organization) by unanimous decision on 17 March 2007.

In the first defense of his second title reign, Mormeck lost his WBA, WBC and lineal cruiserweight titles as he was bested by mandatory challenger and knockout specialist David Haye on 10 November 2007. Mormeck was dropped heavily in the 7th round after being hit by a strong right from Haye. Although Mormeck rose up just in time, the referee realized that he was dazed and in no condition to go on, which caused the contest to be stopped and Haye winning the fight by knockout.

=== 2009–2010: heavyweight ===
On 17 December 2009, Mormeck made his return to the ring after a two-year layoff, fighting for the first time as a heavyweight, against Vinny Maddalone. He outpointed the veteran heavyweight over 8 rounds.

Mormeck fought Uzbek heavyweight and WBA #7 Timur Ibragimov (30–3–1, 16 KOs) on 2 December 2010, at Halle Carpentier, Paris. Mormeck started slowly but dominated the middle rounds to win a split decision (116–112, 116–111, 113–115).

=== 2012: Mormeck vs. Klitschko ===
In October 2011, Mormeck was signed to fight unified Heavyweight Champion Wladimir Klitschko on 10 December 2011 at Esprit Arena, Düsseldorf, Germany until Klitschko pulled out after having a kidney stone removed on 2 December 2011. The fight was postponed to 3 March 2012. In this fight, Mormeck attempted to be only the third cruiserweight champion to win a world title at Heavyweight, after Evander Holyfield and David Haye. However, he was defeated by fourth round KO.

=== Return to cruiserweight and retirement ===
Following another extended layoff, Mormeck returned to the ring in June 2014 against Tamas Lodi of Hungary. Despite his early stoppage win, Mormeck openly expressed weariness for the fight game following the match, calling for a quick title shot before he could put an end to his career.

Instead, Mormeck had to get through a fight with former EBU champion Mateusz Masternak, which he lost via majority decision. As he had promised before each of his final two fights, he retired following his defeat.

== Trivia ==
- Before his first encounter with O'Neil Bell, Mormeck had no nickname, so he asked his fans to come up with one. He did not know that the fans had selected the moniker "The Marksman" until it was announced at the fight.
- Mormeck made one appearance in a French television talk-show called "Tout le monde en parle" to raise his mainstream profile.

== Professional boxing record ==
43 fights	37 wins	6 losses
By knockout	23	3
By decision	14	3

No.	Result	Record	Opponent	Type	Round, time	Date	Location	Notes
43	Loss	37–6	Mateusz Masternak	MD	10	5 Dec 2014	Palais des sports Robert Charpentier, Issy-les-Moulineaux, France	
42	Win	37–5	Tamas Lodi	TKO	4 (10)	26 Jun 2014	Patinoire olympique, Asnières-sur-Seine, France	
41	Loss	36–5	Wladimir Klitschko	KO	4 (12), 1:12	3 Mar 2012	Esprit Arena, Düsseldorf, Germany	For WBA (Super), IBF, WBO, IBO, and The Ring heavyweight titles
40	Win	36–4	Timur Ibragimov	SD	12	2 Dec 2010	Halle Georges Carpentier, Paris, France	Won vacant WBA International heavyweight title
39	Win	35–4	Fres Oquendo	UD	10	6 May 2010	Halle Georges Carpentier, Paris, France	
38	Win	34–4	Vinny Maddalone	UD	8	17 Dec 2009	Halle Georges Carpentier, Paris, France	
37	Loss	33–4	David Haye	TKO	7 (12), 1:54	10 Nov 2007	Palais des sports Marcel-Cerdan Levallois-Perret, France	Lost WBA (Unified), WBC, and The Ring cruiserweight titles
36	Win	33–3	O'Neil Bell	UD	12	17 Mar 2007	Palais des sports Marcel-Cerdan, Levallois-Perret, France	Won WBA (Unified), WBC, and The Ring cruiserweight titles
35	Win	32–3	Sebastian Hill	TKO	4 (10), 2:32	8 Jul 2006	Savvis Center, St. Louis, Missouri, US	
34	Loss	31–3	O'Neil Bell	KO	10 (12), 2:50	7 Jan 2006	Madison Square Garden, New York City, New York, US	Lost WBA (Unified), WBC, and The Ring cruiserweight titles; For IBF cruiserweight title
33	Win	31–2	Wayne Braithwaite	UD	12	2 Apr 2005	DCU Center, Worcester, Massachusetts, US	Retained WBA (Unified) cruiserweight title; Won WBC and vacant The Ring cruiserweight titles
32	Win	30–2	Virgil Hill	UD	12	22 May 2004	Carnival City, Brakpan, South Africa	Retained WBA cruiserweight title
31	Win	29–2	Alexander Gurov	TKO	8 (12), 0:32	1 Mar 2003	Thomas & Mack Center, Paradise, Nevada, US	Retained WBA cruiserweight title
30	Win	28–2	Dale Brown	TKO	8 (12)	10 Aug 2002	Plages du Prado, Marseille, France	Retained WBA cruiserweight title
29	Win	27–2	Virgil Hill	RTD	9 (12), 0:01	23 Feb 2002	Palais des Sports, Marseille, France	Won WBA cruiserweight title
28	Win	26–2	Franklin Edmondson	PTS	8	8 Oct 2001	Palais des Sports, Paris, France	
27	Win	25–2	Vinson Durham	TKO	2 (8)	4 Aug 2001	Plages du Prado, Marseille, France	
26	Win	24–2	Antonio Fernando Caldas Jr.	TKO	3 (8)	14 May 2001	Palais des Sports, Paris, France	
25	Win	23–2	Valeriy Vykhor	TKO	3 (10)	3 Apr 2001	Salle Bellevue, Fréjus, France	
24	Win	22–2	Juan Carlos Viloria	TKO	10 (12)	29 Jan 2001	Palais des Sports, Paris, France	Retained WBA Inter-Continental light-heavyweight title
23	Win	21–2	Livin Castillo	TKO	3 (12), 2:36	16 Dec 2000	Forum Bicentenario, Maracay, Venezuela	Won vacant WBA Inter-Continental light-heavyweight title
22	Win	20–2	Jerry Williams	TKO	6 (8)	3 Oct 2000	Ice Hall, Helsinki, Finland	
21	Win	19–2	Antonio Pedro Quiganga	TKO	2 (8)	16 Sep 2000	Châteauroux, France	
20	Win	18–2	Kostyantyn Okhrey	TKO	3 (8)	16 May 2000	Boulogne-sur-Mer, France	
19	Win	17–2	Tim Hillie	KO	4 (8)	25 Apr 2000	Saint-Quentin, France	
18	Win	16–2	Jerry Williams	KO	7 (10)	7 Mar 2000	Dijon, France	
17	Win	15–2	Rob Bleakley	TKO	4 (8)	15 Feb 2000	Palais des Sports, Épinal, France	
16	Win	14–2	Bruce Rumbolz	TKO	4 (10)	7 Dec 1999	Saint-Vallier, France	
15	Win	13–2	Pascal Warusfel	UD	10	26 Oct 1999	Guilherand-Granges, France	Retained France light-heavyweight title
14	Win	12–2	Ganguina Larme	PTS	10	18 May 1999	Noisy-le-Grand, France	Retained France light-heavyweight title
13	Win	11–2	Joe Stevenson	TKO	2 (8)	2 Feb 1999	Pont-Sainte-Maxence, France	
12	Win	10–2	Alain Simon	SD	10	10 Nov 1998	Pont-Sainte-Maxence, France	Won France light-heavyweight title
11	Win	9–2	Konstantin Semerdjiev	TKO	5 (8)	13 Oct 1998	Guilherand-Granges, France	
10	Win	8–2	Kamel Amrane	PTS	8	23 May 1998	Noisy-le-Grand, France	
9	Win	7–2	Turan Bagci	PTS	8	20 Jan 1998	Levallois-Perret, France	
8	Win	6–2	Kalin Stoyanov	TKO	7 (8)	20 Dec 1997	Bobigny, France	
7	Win	5–2	Juan Nelongo	TKO	3 (6)	5 Nov 1997	Santa Cruz de Tenerife, Spain	
6	Win	4–2	Harri Hakulinen	PTS	6	24 Jun 1997	Pont-Audemer, France	
5	Loss	3–2	Dominique Mansare	PTS	6	13 Jun 1997	Clermont-Ferrand, France	
4	Loss	3–1	Lee Manuel Ossie	PTS	4	22 May 1997	Los Cristianos, Spain	
3	Win	3–0	Thierry Vuillemin	PTS	6	8 Mar 1997	Noisy-le-Grand, France	
2	Win	2–0	Frederic Goutal	TKO	4 (6)	19 May 1995	Saint-Lô, France	
1	Win	1–0	Pierrick Trideau	TKO	1 (4)	25 Mar 1995	Noisy-le-Grand, France	Professional debut

== See also ==
- List of cruiserweight boxing champions
- List of WBA world champions
- List of WBC world champions

Sporting positions
Regional boxing titles
Preceded by Alain Simon	France light-heavyweight champion 10 November 1998 – April 2000; Vacated	Vacant Title next held by Kamel Amrane
Vacant Title last held by Juan Nelongo	WBA Inter-Continental light-heavyweight champion 16 December 2000 – April 2001; Vacated	Vacant Title next held by Thomas Hansvoll
Vacant Title last held by Juan Carlos Gómez	WBA International heavyweight champion 2 December 2010 – October 2011; Vacated	Vacant Title next held by Alexander Petkovic
World boxing titles
Preceded by Virgil Hill	WBA cruiserweight champion 23 February 2002 – 7 January 2006; Unified title from 2 April 2005	Succeeded by O'Neil Bell
Preceded by Wayne Braithwaite	WBC cruiserweight champion 2 April 2005 – 7 January 2006	Succeeded by O'Neil Bell
Vacant Title last held by Carlos De León	The Ring cruiserweight champion 2 April 2005 – 7 January 2006	Succeeded by O'Neil Bell
Preceded by O'Neil Bell	WBA cruiserweight champion Unified title 17 March 2007 – 10 November 2007	Succeeded by David Haye
Preceded by O'Neil Bell	WBC cruiserweight champion 17 March 2007 – 10 November 2007	Succeeded by David Haye
Preceded by O'Neil Bell	The Ring cruiserweight champion 17 March 2007 – 10 November 2007	Succeeded by David Haye
