= Adam Booth =

British boxer

Adam Booth is a British boxing trainer, best known as the former trainer of British WBA heavyweight champion David Haye.

He competed as an amateur boxer, fighting out of Winston Churchill ABC, Croydon ABC and the Lynn ABC, but did not turn professional due to injury.

== Biography ==
Booth has trained and managed a number of boxers from the British Isles including David Haye, George Groves, Andy Lee, Danny Williams, Gary Logan and leading female fighter Cathy Brown.

During a fight between Haye and Chisora, Booth was gashed in the head by a tripod that was thrown in his direction by Haye. Booth was born in 1968 in South London. Adam Booth's nickname is Dark Lord for being very outspoken for a trainer.

His reputation as a physical trainer extends beyond boxing as he has also acted as a health consultant for Kylie Minogue.

His current stable of fighters includes Josh Kelly, Mick Conlan & Ellie Scotney
