= Adolpho Washington =

American boxer

Personal information
- Born: Adolpho Washington; September 7, 1967 (age 59) Lexington, Kentucky, U.S.
- Height: 5 ft 11 1/2 in (182 cm)
- Weight: Light heavyweight; Cruiserweight

Boxing career
- Reach: 76 in (193 cm)
- Stance: Orthodox

Boxing record
- Total fights: 44
- Wins: 31
- Win by KO: 17
- Losses: 10
- Draws: 2
- No contests: 1

Adolpho Washington (born 7 September 1967) is a retired professional boxer. He held the IBF cruiserweight title from 1996 until 1997, and challenged twice for WBA world titles at cruiserweight and light heavyweight.

== Career ==
Washington turned pro in 1989 at light-heavy and in 1990 lost a decision to a fighter named K.Casimier with a 2–6–1 record. Later he beat hard-punching fringe contender Drake Thadzi on points. 1993 came his first crack at a title, taking on WBA Light Heavyweight Title holder Virgil Hill. Washington was caught in a bizarre incident in which he was unable to continue after being cut by bumping his head against a TV camera in the 11th round. Washington was clearly losing the fight, and lost a technical decision.

=== Cruiserweight ===
The following year and one weight class higher, he beat an out-of ashape Iran Barkley on cuts and took on WBC Cruiserweight Title holder Anaclet Wamba, but failed to gain the title in a draw. One year later, he scored a rare KO over hard-punching contender Izegwire and took on Orlin Norris for the WBA Cruiserweight Title and again came up short by a razor-thin decision. In 1996 he was able to win a title, upsetting undefeated former Olympic Gold medalist Torsten May for the vacant IBF Cruiserweight Title. He equally surprisingly lost the title to puncher Uriah Grant in his next bout, and never fought for a major title again.

He never looked good after that losing to Norris and May in rematches. In 1999 he took on James Toney, the only man to stop him inside the distance, after Washington was bleeding excessively from his nose. In 2001 he lost to Vassily Jirov and retired.

== Professional boxing record ==
44 fights	31 wins	10 losses
By knockout	17	2
By decision	14	8
Draws	2	
No contests	1	

No.	Result	Record	Opponent	Type	Round, time	Date	Location	Notes
44	Loss	31–10–2 (1)	(United States) Jeremy Bates	RTD	1	23/04/2016	(United States) Pullman Plaza Hotel, Huntington	
43	Win	31–9–2 (1)	(United States) Mike Peak	UD	10	28/09/2001	(United States) Applebee Park, Lexington	
42	Loss	30–9–2 (1)	(Kazakhstan) Vassiliy Jirov	UD	10	20/07/2001	(United States) Canton Memorial Civic Center, Canton	
41	Win	30–8–2 (1)	(United States) Bradley Rone	UD	8	19/04/2001	(United States) Cadillac Ranch, Lexington	
40	Win	29–8–2 (1)	(United States) Tim Knight	UD	8	01/03/2001	(United States) Cadillac Ranch, Lexington	
39	NC	28–8–2 (1)	(United States) Dicky Ryan	ND	8	10/02/2000	(United States) Harvey's Casino, Council Bluffs	
38	Win	28–8–2	(United States) Paul Phillips	TKO	3	29/10/1999	(United States) Civic Center, La Porte	
37	Loss	27–8–2	(United States) James Toney	TKO	10	30/07/1999	(United States) Foxwoods Resort Casino, Mashantucket	Referee stopped the bout at 0:52 of the tenth round.
36	Loss	27–7–2	(Germany) Torsten May	TD	9	05/06/1999	(Germany) Ballsporthalle, Frankfurt	IBF Intercontinental Cruiserweight Title.
35	Win	27–6–2	(United States) Art Jimmerson	TKO	3	27/11/1998	(United States) Genesis Center, Gary	Referee stopped the bout at 1:33 of the third round.
34	Loss	26–6–2	(United States) Orlin Norris	UD	12	22/05/1998	(United States) Glen Stock Arena, Monroe	IBA Super Cruiserweight Title.
33	Loss	26–5–2	(United States) Arthur Williams	UD	12	06/01/1998	(United States) Casino Magic, Bay Saint Louis	
32	Loss	26–4–2	(Jamaica) Uriah Grant	MD	12	21/06/1997	(United States) Sun Dome, Tampa	Lost IBF cruiserweight title
31	Win	26–3–2	(Germany) Torsten May	UD	12	31/08/1996	(Spain) Plaza de Toros del Coliseo Balear, Palma de Mallorca	Won vacant IBF cruiserweight title
30	Win	25–3–2	(United States) Artis Pendergrass	UD	10	10/02/1996	(United States) MGM Grand Garden Arena, Las Vegas	
29	Loss	24–3–2	(United States) Orlin Norris	UD	12	17/03/1995	(United States) Memorial Auditorium, Worcester	For WBA cruiserweight title
28	Win	24–2–2	(Nigeria) David Izeqwire	TKO	8	05/11/1994	(United States) Aladdin Hotel & Casino, Las Vegas	
27	Draw	23–2–2	(France) Anaclet Wamba	PTS	12	14/07/1994	(Monaco) Sporting Club, Monte Carlo	For WBC cruiserweight title
26	Win	23–2–1	(United States) Dale Jackson	PTS	12	24/02/1994	(United States) Stouffer Hotel, Austin	
25	Win	22–2–1	(United States) Iran Barkley	TKO	6	20/10/1993	(United States) Casino Magic, Bay Saint Louis	
24	Win	21–2–1	(United States) Tim Noble	PTS	8	17/07/1993	(United States) The Pyramid, Memphis	
23	Win	20–2–1	(United States) Vaughn Hooks	SD	10	15/05/1993	(United States) Trump Castle, Atlantic City	
22	Loss	19–2–1	(United States) Virgil Hill	TD	11	20/02/1993	(United States) Fargodome, Fargo	For WBA light heavyweight title
21	Win	19–1–1	(Malawi) Drake Thadzi	UD	10	16/01/1993	(United States) Freeman Coliseum, San Antonio	
20	Win	18–1–1	(United States) Mike Brooks	TKO	1	29/08/1992	(United States) Colonial Theatre, Fredericksburg	
19	Win	17–1–1	(United States) Richard Mincy	TKO	1	07/08/1992	(United States) Knockout Sports Saloon, Lexington	
18	Win	16–1–1	(United States) Tony Brown	KO	1	26/10/1991	(United States) National Guard Armory, Columbus	
17	Win	15–1–1	(United States) Dana Taylor	KO	1	19/10/1991	(United States) Beaver Lake	
16	Win	14–1–1	(United States) Anthony Willis	PTS	6	08/10/1991	(United States) Saint Louis	
15	Win	13–1–1	(United States) Kevin Casimier	UD	10	02/10/1991	(United States) Breeding's, Lexington	
14	Loss	12–1–1	(United States) Kevin Casimier	SD	10	28/11/1990	(United States) Hyatt Regency, Tampa	
13	Win	12–0–1	(United States) Rocky Fabrizio	TKO	1	09/11/1990	(United States) Diplomat Hotel, Hollywood	Referee stopped the bout at 3:03 of the first round.
12	Win	11–0–1	(United States) Ron Mims	UD	8	16/10/1990	(United States) Hyatt Regency, Tampa	
11	Win	10–0–1	(United States) Rocky Bentley	UD	6	28/08/1990	(United States) Hyatt Regency, Tampa	
10	Win	9–0–1	(United States) Jeff Cooper	TKO	1	28/07/1990	(United States) Hilton Hotel, Saint Petersburg	
9	Win	8–0–1	(United States) Nathon Jackson	KO	2	10/02/1990	(United States) Metairie	
8	Draw	7–0–1	(United States) David Graves	PTS	6	25/01/1990	(United States) Municipal Auditorium, New Orleans	
7	Win	7–0	(United States) Elton Dublin	KO	3	23/09/1989	(United States) Civic Center, Bossier City	
6	Win	6–0	(United States) Ron Lewis	TKO	4	01/08/1989	(United States) Park West, Chicago	Referee stopped the bout at 2:21 of the fourth round.
5	Win	5–0	(United States) David Bates	TKO	1	15/07/1989	(United States) Trump Castle, Atlantic City	
4	Win	4–0	(United States) Rick Mayer	TKO	1	18/05/1989	(United States) Hyatt's Patterson's Ballroom, Lexington	
3	Win	3–0	(United States) Oscar Raglin Strickland	KO	1	02/05/1989	(United States) Park West, Chicago	Strickland knocked out at 1:50 of the first round.
2	Win	2–0	(United States) Jordan Keepers	KO	2	07/04/1989	(United States) I-X Center, Cleveland	
1	Win	1–0	(United States) Phil Scott	UD	4	07/03/1989	(United States) Park West, Chicago	

== See also ==
- List of world cruiserweight boxing champions

Sporting positions
Regional boxing titles
Vacant Title last held by Thomas Hearns	NABF Cruiserweight champion February 24, 1994 – 1994; Vacated	Vacant Title next held by James Heath
Minor world boxing titles
Preceded by David Izeqwire	IBO cruiserweight champion November 5, 1994 – 1995; Vacated	Vacant Title next held by Ted Cofie
Major world boxing titles
Vacant Title last held by Al Cole	IBF Cruiserweight champion August 31, 1996 – June 21, 1997	Succeeded by Uriah Grant
