= List of NABF champions =

The following is a list of NABF champions, showing every champion certificated by the North American Boxing Federation (NABF), in operation since 1969.

- ^{r} – Champion relinquished title.
- ^{s} – Champion stripped of title.

== Heavyweight ==
No.	Name	Duration of reign	Defences
1	(United States) Leotis Martin	December 6, 1969 – February 2, 1970^{r}	0
2	(United States) Muhammad Ali	December 7, 1970 – February 1971^{r}	0
3	(United States) George Foreman	May 10, 1971 – July 20, 1971^{r}	0
4	(United States) Muhammad Ali (2)	July 26, 1971 – March 31, 1973	5
5	(United States) Ken Norton	March 31, 1973 – September 10, 1973	0
6	(United States) Muhammad Ali (3)	September 10, 1973 – October 30, 1974^{r}	1
7	(United States) Ken Norton (2)	March 24, 1975 – January 20, 1976^{r}	0
8	(United States) George Foreman (2)	January 24, 1976 – March 17, 1977^{r}	1
9	(United States) Leroy Jones	August 19, 1978 – October 20, 1979^{r}	0
10	(United States) Michael Dokes	January 30, 1982 – December 10, 1982^{r}	1
11	(United States) Tim Witherspoon	September 23, 1983 – March 9, 1984^{r}	0
12	(United States) James Broad	August 23, 1984 – April 29, 1985	0
13	(United States) Tim Witherspoon (2)	April 29, 1985 – January 17, 1986^{r}	1
14	(United States) Larry Alexander	April 10, 1987 – November 25, 1987	0
15	(United States) Orlin Norris	November 25, 1987 – February 17, 1990	5
16	(United States) Bert Cooper	February 17, 1990 – August 5, 1990	0
17	(United States) Ray Mercer	August 5, 1990 – January 11, 1991^{r}	0
18	(United States) Orlin Norris (2)	April 30, 1991 – June 3, 1991	0
19	(United States) Tony Tucker	June 3, 1991 – December 1, 1992^{r}	1
20	(United States) Alex García	December 8, 1992 – March 1, 1994	4
21	(United States) Joe Hipp	March 2, 1994 – March 9, 1995^{s}	1
22	(Russia) Alexander Zolkin	August 25, 1995 – May 1, 1996^{s}	2
23	(United States) Tony Tucker (2)	June 29, 1996 – December 1996^{s}	0
24	(United States) John Ruiz	January 14, 1997 – January 15, 1999^{r}	3
25	(United States) Michael Grant	January 30, 1999 – April 29, 2000^{r}	1
26	(United States) Clifford Etienne	September 9, 2000 – March 6, 2001^{s}	0
27	(United States) Obed Sullivan	May 20, 2001 – September 2, 2001	0
28	(United States) Fres Oquendo	September 2, 2001 – April 13, 2002	0
29	(New Zealand) David Tua	April 13, 2002 – March 29, 2003^{s}	0
30	(United States) Joe Mesi	June 24, 2003 – September 19, 2003	0
31	(Cuba) Eliecer Castillo	September 19, 2003 – April 17, 2004	1
Castillo won the interim title on June 6, 2003, and was later promoted to full champion after Mesi failed to defend the title
32	(United States) DaVarryl Williamson	April 17, 2004 – October 2, 2004^{s}	0
33	(Nigeria) Samuel Peter	December 4, 2004 – September 24, 2005	1
34	(Ukraine) Wladimir Klitschko	September 24, 2005 – April 22, 2006^{r}	0
35	(United States) Samuel Peter (2)	April 28, 2006 – September 2007^{r}	2
36	(United States) Hasim Rahman	September 2007 – June 2008^{r}	1
37	(United States) Travis Walker	June 2008 – November 29, 2008	0
38	(United States) Chris Arreola	November 29, 2008 – August 2009^{r}	1
39	(United States) Johnathon Banks	March 20, 2010 – May 2012^{r}	3
40	(United States) Tony Grano	June 23, 2012 – April 27, 2013	0
41	(United States) Éric Molina	April 27, 2013 – October 2013	0
42	(United States) Andy Ruiz Jr.	November 24, 2013 – November 2016^{r}	5
43	(Colombia) Óscar Rivas	September 28, 2017 – June 2019^{r}	3
44	(Russia) Arslanbek Makhmudov	September 28, 2019 – December 23, 2023	9
45	(Germany) Agit Kabayel	December 23, 2023 — August 2024	0
46	(Democratic Republic of the Congo) Martin Bakole	August 3, 2024 - February 2025	0
47	(United States) Richard Torrez Jr	April 4, 2025 - January 2026	1
48	(United States) Pryce Taylor	November 7, 2026 -	0

== Cruiserweight ==
No.	Name	Duration of reign	Defences
1	(United States) Marvin Camel	June 6, 1979 – March 31, 1980^{r}	0
2	(United States) S. T. Gordon	August 6, 1980 – June 27, 1982^{r}	1
3	(United States) Leon Spinks	October 31, 1982 – March 6, 1983^{r}	0
4	(United States) Anthony Davis	May 16, 1984 – June 19, 1985	0
5	(Nigeria) Bash Ali	June 19, 1985 – April 22, 1986	0
6	(United States) Henry Tillman	April 22, 1986 – June 15, 1986	0
7	(United States) Bert Cooper	June 15, 1986 – February 15, 1989	5
8	(United States) Nate Miller	February 15, 1989 – December 17, 1990	3
9	(United States) James Warring	December 17, 1990 – August 7, 1991^{r}	0
10	(United States) Orlin Norris	August 17, 1991 – November 6, 1993^{r}	3
11	(United States) Thomas Hearns	January 29, 1994 – February 20, 1994^{r}	1
12	(United States) Adolpho Washington	February 24, 1994 – July 14, 1994^{r}	0
13	(United States) James Heath	January 27, 1995 – June 17, 1995^{r}	0
14	(United States) Brian LaSpada	June 17, 1995 – May 5, 1997	2
15	(United States) Dale Brown	May 5, 1997– February 12, 2000	4
16	(Guyana) Wayne Braithwaite	February 12, 2000 – January 5, 2001^{r}	0
17	(Jamaica) O'Neil Bell	January 18, 2001 – June 2, 2004^{r}	5
18	(United States) Dale Brown (2)	June 8, 2004– February 4, 2005^{r}	0
19	(United States) Ali Supreme	March 10, 2005 – June 16, 2005	0
20	(United States) Arthur Williams	June 16, 2005 – October 27, 2005	0
21	(United States) Felix Cora Jr.	October 27, 2005 – May 18, 2006	1
22	(Russia) Vadim Tokarev	May 18, 2006 – April 1, 2007^{r}	1
23	(United States) Matt Godfrey	2007-04-06 – August 2009	3
24	(United States) Jason Robinson	April 17, 2010 – August 2010^{r}	0
25	(Nigeria) Lateef Kayode	October 15, 2010 – August 2011	2
26	(United States) Garrett Wilson	April 14, 2012 – January 2013	0
27	(Canada) Denton Daley	March 4, 2013 – May 2013	0
28	(South Africa) Thabiso Mchunu	January 24, 2014 – April 2015	1
29	(United States) Andrew Tabiti	May 13, 2016 – May 2018	3
30	(United States) Alante Green	November 24, 2021 – September 2023	1
31	(Canada) Ryan Rozicki	September 30, 2023 – March 14, 2026^{s}	0
32	(Nigeria) Efetobor Wesley Apochi	March 27, 2026 – Present	0

== Light heavyweight ==
No.	Name	Duration of reign	Defences
1	(United States) Jimmy Dupree	July 3, 1971 – October 29, 1971	1
2	(United States) Mike Quarry	October 29, 1971 – 1972	0
3	(United States) Richie Kates	May 29, 1974 – 1975	0
4	(United States) Lonnie Bennett	May 8, 1976 – November 1976	0
5	(United States) Matthew Saad Muhammad	July 26, 1977 – March 1979^{r}	3
6	(United States) Jerry Martin	August 7, 1979 – January 1980	1
7	(United States) Willie Edwards	August 14, 1982 – December 3, 1982	0
8	(United States) Pete McIntyre	December 3, 1982 – June 23, 1983	1
9	(United States) Willie Edwards (2)	June 23, 1983 – June 26, 1987	5
10	(United States) Tony Willis	June 26, 1987 – January 1989^{r}	3
11	(United States) Andrew Maynard	April 1, 1990 – January 10, 1992	4
12	(United States) Frank Tate	January 10, 1992 – February 1992^{r}	0
13	(Canada) Egerton Marcus	December 1, 1992 – June 1994^{r}	3
14	(Dominican Republic) Merqui Sosa	June 30, 1995 – October 1995	0
15	(United States) Montell Griffin	July 11, 1996 – November 1996	0
16	(United States) Michael Nunn	January 17, 1997 – April 1997^{r}	0
17	(Dominican Republic) Merqui Sosa (2)	May 10, 1997 – March 3, 1998	0
18	(United States) Kenny Bowman	March 3, 1998 – June 19, 1998	0
19	(United States) Derrick Harmon	June 19, 1998 – October 1998	0
20	(United States) Eric Harding	November 13, 1998 – April 1999	0
21	(United States) Greg Wright	May 23, 1999 – July 14, 2000	2
22	(United States) Reggie Johnson	July 14, 2000 – January 25, 2002	1
23	(United States) Antonio Tarver	January 25, 2002 – June 2002	0
24	(United States) Montell Griffin (2)	November 3, 2002 – March 2003^{r}	0
25	(United States) Donnell Wiggins	October 11, 2003 – November 2003^{r}	0
26	(Romania) Lucian Bute	February 19, 2005 – March 2005^{r}	0
27	(United States) Eric Harding (2)	October 21, 2005 – June 2, 2006	0
28	(United States) Chad Dawson	June 2, 2006 – January 2007^{r}	0
29	(United States) Chris Henry	May 3, 2007 – February 6, 2009	2
30	(United States) Yusaf Mack	February 6, 2009 – April 2009^{r}	0
31	(Ukraine) Ismail Sillakh	April 3, 2010 – April 27, 2012	1
32	(Russia) Denis Grachev	April 27, 2012 – November 3, 2012	0
33	(Romania) Lucian Bute (2)	April 27, 2012 – January 18, 2014	0
34	(Canada) Jean Pascal	January 18, 2014 – February 2015^{r}	0
35	(Malawi) Isaac Chilemba	March 14, 2015 – October 2015^{r}	0
36	(Ukraine) Oleksandr Gvozdyk	April 9, 2016 – February 2018^{r}	4
37	(United States) Alfonso López III	November 16, 2019 – December 18, 2020^{r}	0
38	(Mexico) Gilberto Ramirez	December 18, 2020 – December 2021^{s}	0
39	(Egypt) Ahmed Elbiali	June 9, 2023 – December 2023	0
40	(Russia) Imam Khataev	January 14, 2024 – Present	4

== Super middleweight ==
No.	Name	Duration of reign	Defences
1	(United States) James Kinchen	October 13, 1988 – November 4, 1988	0
2	(United States) Thomas Hearns	November 4, 1988 – March 1989^{r}	0
3	(United States) Don Lee	April 14, 1989 – June 19, 1989	0
4	(United States) Paul Whittaker	June 19, 1989 – November 13, 1990	1
5	(United States) Randall Yonker	November 13, 1990 – November 29, 1991	2
6	(United States) Michael Nunn	November 29, 1991 – September 1992^{r}	0
7	(United States) Frankie Liles	October 21, 1992 – 1993	0
8	(United States) Warren Williams	November 10, 1993 – May 28, 1994	1
9	(United States) Cecil McKenzie	May 28, 1994 – March 1995	1
10	(United States) Bryant Brannon	April 4, 1995 – September 1996^{r}	2
11	(Uganda) Joseph Kiwanuka	November 8, 1996 – October 28, 1997	2
12	(United States) Thomas Tate	October 28, 1997 – April 1999^{r}	3
13	(United States) Randie Carver	May 23, 1999 – September 12, 1999	0
14	(Egypt) Kabary Salem	September 12, 1999 – April 2000	0
15	(United States) Scott Pemberton	September 22, 2000 – September 2001	0
16	(United States) Charles Brewer	October 5, 2001 – March 2002^{r}	0
17	(United States) Antwun Echols	April 9, 2002 – June 2003^{r}	2
18	(United States) Scott Pemberton (2)	July 25, 2003 – August 2005	2
19	(Romania) Lucian Bute	September 16, 2005 – May 2007	1
20	(Canada) Jean Pascal	June 8, 2007 – November 2008^{r}	2
21	(United States) Andre Ward	February 6, 2009 – September 2009	1
22	(Canada) Sébastien Demers	November 7, 2009 – March 2010	0
23	(United States) Farah Ennis	November 19, 2010 – March 2011	0
24	(United States) Jesús González	July 8, 2011 – December 2011^{r}	0
25	(United States) Dyah Davis	January 6, 2012 – June 2, 2012	0
26	(Australia) Sakio Bika	June 2, 2012 – February 2013	0
27	(Mexico) Marco Antonio Peribán	March 16, 2013 – March 2014^{r}	1
28	(Mexico) Gilberto Ramírez	April 11, 2014 – March 2016^{r}	4
29	(Romania) Ronald Gavril	October 8, 2016 – October 2017^{r}	0
30	(United States) Jesse Hart	April 28, 2018 – November 2018^{r}	1
31	(Canada) Shakeel Phinn	June 8, 2019 – November 2019	0
32	(Canada) Lexson Mathieu	October 10, 2020 – 2021	0
33	(Canada) Erik Bazinyan	June 4, 2021 – September 20, 2024	8
34	(Mexico) Jaime Munguía	September 20, 2024 - April 1, 2025	0
35	(Canada) Wilkens Mathieu	October 30, 2025 – Present	2

== Middleweight ==
No.	Name	Duration of reign	Defences
1	(United States) Denny Moyer	Feb 25, 1970 — Apr 29, 1970	0
2	(United States) Nate Williams	Apr 29, 1970 — Jul 17, 1970	0
3	(United States) Art Hernandez	Jul 17, 1970 — Feb 10, 1971	0
4	(United States) Denny Moyer (2)	Feb 10, 1971 — Sep 6, 1972	7
5	(United States) Art Hernandez (2)	Sep 6, 1972 — Mar 26, 1973	1
6	(United States) Bennie Briscoe	Mar 26, 1973 — Sep 1, 1973	1
7	(Colombia) Rodrigo Valdéz	Sep 1, 1973 — January 1974^{r}	0
8	(United States) Tony Licata	Feb 5, 1974 — Mar 1974^{r}	0
9	(United States) Sugar Ray Seales	Mar 9, 1976 — Jun 1977	2
10	(United States) Ralph Palladin	Jun 21, 1977 — Jun 1977	0
11	(United States) Sugar Ray Seales (2)	Jun 29, 1977 — Aug 1977	0
12	(United States) Ronnie Harris	Apr 10, 1979 — May 13, 1980	0
13	(United States) Sammy NeSmith	May 19, 1980 — Mar 31, 1981	0
14	(United States) Sugar Ray Seales (3)	Mar 31, 1981 — Oct 23, 1982	0
15	(United States) James Shuler	Oct 23, 1982 — Mar 10, 1986	2
16	(United States) Thomas Hearns	Mar 10, 1986 — Sep 1987^{r}	1
17	(United States) Michael Nunn	Oct 29, 1987 — Jun 1988^{r}	2
18	(United States) Ron Essett	Oct 18, 1988 — Nov 1988	0
19	(United States) Kevin Watts	Oct 12, 1989 — Sep 27, 1990	0
20	(United States) Fabian Williams	Sep 27, 1990 — Jul 16, 1991	1
21	(Puerto Rico) Ismael Negron	Jul 16, 1991 — Nov 1991^{r}	1
22	(United States) Lamar Parks	December 5, 1991 — Mar 1992	0
23	(Canada) Otis Grant	Sep 28, 1992 — Mar 15, 1994	3
24	(United States) Quincy Taylor	Mar 15, 1994 — Jul 1995^{r}	3
25	(United States) Otis Grant (2)	Oct 10, 1995 — Nov 1997^{r}	3
26	(United States) Antwun Echols	Feb 10, 1998 — Nov 1999^{r}	3
27	(United States) Antwun Echols (2)	May 5, 2000 — Nov 2000^{r}	0
28	(Panama) Tito Mendoza	December 10, 2000 — Apr 2001	1
29	(United States) Robert Allen	October 26, 2001 — Jun 2002	1
30	(United States) Carl Daniels	Jul 27, 2002 — 2003	0
31	(Nigeria) Kingsley Ikeke	Aug 29, 2003 — Jun 2004	1
32	(United States) Kelly Pavlik	Oct 7, 2005 — May 2007^{r}	2
33	(United States) Bronco McKart	Aug 10, 2007 — Dec 7, 2007	0
34	(Mexico) Enrique Ornelas	December 7, 2007 — Jul 2008	1
35	(Russia) Roman Karmazin	December 20, 2008 — May 2009	1
36	(United States) Peter Manfredo	January 29, 2010 — Apr 2010	0
37	(United States) Daniel Jacobs	May 15, 2010 — Jun 2010^{r}	0
38	(United States) Fernando Guerrero	July 16, 2010 — Apr 2011^{r}	1
39	(Republic of Ireland) Andy Lee	May 18, 2011 — Oct 2011	0
40	(Colombia) Jose Míguel Torres	Nov 5, 2011 — Jun 2012	0
41	(Poland) Patrick Majewski	Jul 7, 2012 — Aug 2012	0
42	(United States) Curtis Stevens	Jan 19, 2013 — Apr 2013	0
43	(United States) Curtis Stevens (2)	Aug 3, 2013 — Oct 2013^{r}	0
44	(Canada) David Lemieux	May 24, 2014 — May 2015^{r}	1
45	(Ukraine) Evhen Khytrov	Oct 31, 2015 — Jul 2016	1
46	(Republic of Ireland) Jason Quigley	Mar 23, 2017 — Jul 18, 2019	1
47	(The Bahamas) Tureano Johnson	Jul 18, 2019 — Nov 2019	0
48	(Mexico) Jose de Jesus Macias	Jan 29, 2021 – Jan 2022	0
49	(Canada) Steven Butler	Jun 23, 2022 – May 2022	2
50	(United States) Marquis Taylor	March 16, 2024 - October 2024	2
51	(United States) Francis Hogan	November 15, 2025 - Present	1

== Super welterweight ==
No.	Name	Duration of reign	Defences
1	(United States) Ralph Palladin	September 8, 1971 – November 1971	0
2	(The Bahamas) Elisha Obed	January 21, 1975 – August 1975	0
3	(United States) Mike Baker	September 16, 1975 – October 1975	0
4	(United States) Steve Delgado	January 18, 1980 – October 7, 1980	0
5	(United States) Rocky Mosley Jr	October 7, 1980 – April 25, 1981	0
6	(United States) Rocky Fratto	April 25, 1981 – June 1982	1
7	(United States) David Braxton	June 12, 1983 – August 1986	3
8	(United States) Milton McCrory	March 7, 1987 – April 1988	1
9	(Mexico) Lupe Aquino	June 24, 1988 – November 1988	0
10	(United States) Terry Norris	December 9, 1988 – March 1990	2
11	(United States) Brett Lally	June 25, 1990 – August 1991	2
12	(United States) Gilbert Baptist	September 30, 1991 – November 1991	0
13	(United States) Wayne Powell	May 29, 1992 – October 23, 1993	3
14	(Dominican Republic) Julio César Green	October 23, 1993 – June 1994	1
15	(United States) Winky Wright	February 4, 1995 – May 1996^{r}	2
16	(United States) Steve Martinez	March 4, 1997 – September 30, 1997	1
17	(Guyana) Tony Marshall	September 30, 1997 – October 1997	2
18	(United States) Anthony Jones	March 26, 1999 – April 19, 2000	1
19	(United States) Jason Papillion	April 19, 2000 – June 10, 2000	0
20	(United States) Bronco McKart	June 10, 2000 – September 9, 2000	0
21	(United States) Winky Wright (2)	July 16, 1991 – September 2001^{r}	1
22	(Mexico) Ángel Hernández	January 12, 2002 – December 13, 2002	1
23	(Colombia) Juan Carlos Candelo	December 13, 2002 – January 2004	1
24	(United States) Rodney Jones	April 14, 2004 – October 2005	2
25	(Ukraine) Andrey Tsurkan	June 10, 2006 – December 6, 2007	1
26	(Israel) Yuri Foreman	December 6, 2007 – June 2009	2
27	(United States) Willie Lee	August 23, 2009 – December 19, 2009	0
28	(United States) Vanes Martirosyan	December 19, 2009 – March 2011	2
29	(United States) Grady Brewer	June 17, 2011 – December 22, 2011	0
30	(United States) Michael Medina	December 22, 2011 – August 2012	0
31	(United States) Willie Nelson	September 15, 2012 – May 2014	2
32	(Republic of Ireland) Andy Lee	June 7, 2014 – November 2014	0
33	(Mexico) Ramón Álvarez	January 30, 2016 – August 2016	0
34	(Russia) Radzhab Butaev	November 19, 2016 – May 2017	0
35	(Dominican Republic) Carlos Adames	October 13, 2018 – October 2019^{r}	2
36	(United States) Travell Mazion	January 11, 2020 – July 15, 2020	0
37	(Kazakhstan) Sadriddin Akhmedov	January 29, 2021 – January 2022	0
38	(Russia) Artem Organesyan	Mar 26, 2022 – June 23, 2022	1
39	(Mexico) Dante Jardón	June 23, 2022 – December 2022	0
40	(Puerto Rico) Xander Zayas	December 10, 2022 – May 2025	6
41	(United States) Justin Figueroa	November 7, 2025 - October 2026	0

== Welterweight ==
No.	Name	Duration of reign	Defences
1	(United States) Armando Muñíz	November 19, 1971 – August 1972	1
2	(Canada) Fernand Marcotte	August 21, 1972 – September 1972	0
3	(United States) Armando Muñíz (2)	September 11, 1972 – January 30, 1973	0
4	(United States) Eddie Perkins	January 30, 1973 – April 1973	1
5	(United States) Pete Ranzany	February 24, 1976 – August 12, 1979	5
6	(United States) Sugar Ray Leonard	August 12, 1979 – November 30, 1979^{r}	1
7	(United States) Randy Shields	May 2, 1980 – June 1980	0
8	(United States) Greg Stephens	June 3, 1980 – November 11, 1980	1
9	(Mexico) Jose Dominguez	November 11, 1980 – April 7, 1981	0
10	(United States) Bruce Finch	April 7, 1981 – May 4, 1982	1
11	(United States) Donald Curry	May 4, 1982 – January 1983	1
12	(United States) Marlon Starling	April 23, 1983 – June 15, 1984	2
13	(United States) Pedro Vilella	June 15, 1984 – July 23, 1985	0
14	(United States) Maurice Blocker	July 23, 1985 – November 1985	0
15	(Dominican Republic) Luis Santana	November 7, 1986 – March 5, 1987	0
16	(United States) Tommy Ayers	March 5, 1987 – June 1987	0
17	(Dominican Republic) Luis Santana (2)	January 8, 1988 – January 30, 1989	2
18	(United States) Derrick Kelly	January 30, 1989 – July 18, 1989	2
19	(United States) Russell Mitchell	July 18, 1989 – November 30, 1989	0
20	(United States) Aaron Davis	November 30, 1989 – May 1990	0
21	(United States) Lonnie Smith	August 20, 1990 – June 1991	0
22	(United States) David Gonzalez	July 26, 1991 – February 1992	0
23	(United States) Roger Turner	February 8, 1992 – June 19, 1992	0
24	(Mexico) Yori Boy Campas	June 19, 1992 – August 1992	0
25	(United States) Larry Barnes	May 13, 1993 – January 1994	1
26	(United States) Anthony Jones	April 5, 1994 – June 1994	0
27	(United States) Derrell Coley	July 5, 1994 – August 12, 1995	2
28	(United States) Oba Carr	August 12, 1995 – November 1995	0
29	(United States) Ross Thompson	December 31, 1995 – February 1996	0
30	(United States) Kip Diggs	September 17, 1996 – January 7, 1997	0
31	(United States) Tony Martin	January 7, 1997 – February 1997	0
32	(United States) Derrell Coley (2)	March 25, 1997 – July 1998	2
33	(United States) Vernon Forrest	August 18, 1998 – July 2000	4
34	(United States) Danny Perez Ramírez	October 12, 2000 – January 2001	0
35	(United States) Golden Johnson	March 22, 2001 – June 2002	1
36	(Jamaica) Teddy Teid	June 28, 2002 – July 17, 2004	2
37	(Puerto Rico) Kermit Cintrón	July 17, 2004 – March 2005	0
38	(United States) Steve Martinez	April 28, 2005 – October 2005	0
39	(United States) Oscar Díaz	June 14, 2006 – November 10, 2006	0
40	(United States) Golden Johnson (2)	November 10, 2006 – August 2007	0
41	(United States) Andre Berto	September 29, 2007 – May 2008	1
42	(Mexico) Jesús Soto Karass	July 25, 2008 – October 2008	0
43	(Mexico) Canelo Álvarez	January 17, 2009 – April 2010^{r}	5
44	(United States) Shawn Porter	October 15, 2010 – January 2012	1
45	(Puerto Rico) Thomas Dulorme	February 17, 2012 – August 2012	0
46	(Canada) Antonin Décarie	September 29, 2012 – March 2013^{r}	0
47	(Mexico) Jesús Soto Karass (2)	July 27, 2013 – November 2013^{r}	0
48	(United States) Paulie Malignaggi	December 7, 2013 – March 2014^{r}	0
49	(Canada) Mikaël Zewski	June 28, 2014 – May 1, 2015	1
50	(Russia) Konstantin Ponomarev	May 1, 2015 – November 2016	1
51	(Lithuania) Egidijus Kavaliauskas	September 22, 2017 – October 2019	4
52	(United States) Blair Cobbs	November 2, 2019 – February 2021	1
53	(Mexico) Raúl Curiel	June 19, 2021 – August 1, 2026	6

== Super lightweight ==
No.	Name	Duration of reign	Defences
1	(United States) Tony Petronelli	March 17, 1976 – April 1976	0
2	(United States) Monroe Brooks	December 1, 1977 – April 7, 1978	0
3	(United States) Bruce Curry	April 7, 1978 – September 1978	0
4	(United States) Willie Rodriguez	February 2, 1979 – April 14, 1979	0
5	(United States) Bruce Curry	April 14, 1979 – June 1979	0
6	(Canada) Nick Furlano	March 6, 1981 – March 1981	0
7	(United States) Leroy Haley	April 11, 1981 – June 1982^{r}	0
8	(United States) Ronnie Shields	November 16, 1983 – August 1985	1
9	(United States) Harold Brazier	October 31, 1986 – August 8, 1989	4
10	(Saint Kitts and Nevis) Livingstone Bramble	August 8, 1989 – February 18, 1990	1
11	(Puerto Rico) Santos Cardona	February 18, 1990 – June 15, 1990	0
12	(United States) John Meekins	June 15, 1990 – January 20, 1991	2
13	(Guyana) Terrence Alli	January 20, 1991 – July 1991	1
14	(United States) Tim Burgess	August 24, 1991 – March 1992	0
15	(United States) Greg Haugen	April 3, 1992 – August 1992	0
16	(Mexico) Héctor López	September 3, 1992 – January 1993	0
17	(United States) David Santos	February 24, 1993 – July 27, 1993	0
18	(Mexico) Héctor López (2)	July 27, 1993 – September 1993	0
19	(United States) David Santos (2)	October 26, 1993 – December 1993	0
20	(United States) Joey Gamache	January 28, 1994 – June 1994	0
21	(United States) Darryl Tyson	September 20, 1994 – October 1994	0
22	(United States) Jaime Balboa	December 13, 1994 – January 1995	0
23	(United States) Charles Murray	October 10, 1995 – April 15, 1997	2
24	(United States) Ray Oliveira	April 15, 1997 – August 5, 1997	0
25	(United States) Reggie Green	August 5, 1997 – March 1999	1
26	(Mexico) Ahmed Santos	April 16, 1999 – January 2000	1
27	(United States) Golden Johnson	July 21, 2000 – August 2000	0
28	(Puerto Rico) Alex Trujillo	August 5, 2000 – October 2000	0
29	(United States) Ray Oliveira (2)	December 22, 2000 – August 10, 2001	0
30	(Ghana) Ben Tackie	August 10, 2001 – April 2002	1
31	(United States) Terrance Cauthen	March 28, 2003 – June 2004	2
32	(Canada) Herman Ngoudjo	February 26, 2005 – January 20, 2007	4
33	(Mexico) José Luis Castillo	January 20, 2007 – May 2007	0
34	(Puerto Rico) Francisco Figueroa	July 28, 2007 – November 2008	2
35	(France) Ali Chebah	April 18, 2009 – April 2010	2
36	(Mexico) Pablo César Cano	June 25, 2010 – December 2010	0
37	(United States) Josesito López	January 28, 2011 – August 2011	0
38	(Puerto Rico) Gabriel Bracero	October 21, 2011 – January 21, 2012	0
39	(United States) DeMarcus Corley	January 21, 2012 – April 2012	0
40	(Canada) Dierry Jean	May 19, 2012 – March 2013	2
41	(United States) Paul Spadafora	April 6, 2013 – October 2013	0
42	(Puerto Rico) Thomas Dulorme	March 29, 2014 – March 2015	1
43	(United States) Mauricio Herrera	July 11, 2015 – April 2016	0
44	(United States) Rashad Ganaway	May 12, 2016 – June 2016	0
45	(United States) Regis Prograis	June 25, 2016 – February 2018^{r}	2
46	(Russia) Maxim Dadashev	June 9, 2018 – February 2019	1
47	(United States) Luis Feliciano	August 22, 2019 – 2020	1
48	(Canada) Yves Ulysse Jr.	November 21, 2020 – 2022	1
49	(Republic of Ireland) Lee Reeves	May 5, 2022 – August 2022	0
50	(United States) Teofimo Lopez	August 13, 2022 – December 2022	0
51	(Canada) Steve Claggett	Jun 1, 2023 – May 2024	2
52	(Canada) Arthur Biyarslanov	June 6, 2024 - Present	5

== Lightweight ==
No.	Name	Duration of reign	Defences
1	(United States) Ruben Navarro	September 10, 1970 – February 1971	0
2	(United States) Jimmy Robertson	March 18, 1971 – July 6, 1972	0
3	(Mexico) Chango Carmona	July 6, 1972 – September 1972	0
4	(Puerto Rico) Esteban de Jesús	February 16, 1973 – March 1974	1
5	(United States) Ray Lampkin	October 18, 1974 – March 1975	2
6	(Mexico) Vicente Mijares	April 22, 1976 – March 28, 1978	2
7	(United States) Andy Ganigan	March 28, 1978 – July 1980	4
8	(United States) Jorge Morales	August 19, 1980 – May 16, 1981	0
9	(United States) Ray Mancini	May 16, 1981 – May 1982^{r}	2
10	(Mexico) José Luis Ramírez	November 26, 1982 – March 1983^{r}	0
11	(Canada) Nick Furlano	April 13, 1983 – June 9, 1983	0
12	(United States) Davey Armstrong	June 9, 1983 – July 1983	0
13	(Puerto Rico) Héctor Camacho	April 29, 1985 – May 1985^{r}	0
14	(United States) Tyrone Crawley	June 5, 1985 – February 1986^{r}	0
15	(United States) Greg Haugen	May 23, 1986 – December 1986^{r}	0
16	(United States) Pernell Whitaker	March 28, 1987 – September 1987	1
17	(United States) Primo Ramos	October 28, 1987 – June 1989	2
18	(United States) Darryl Tyson	July 24, 1990 – 1991	0
19	(United States) Frankie Mitchell	July 9, 1991 – August 1992^{r}	3
20	(Mexico) Rafael Ruelas	November 6, 1992 – July 1993	1
21	(United States) Sharmba Mitchell	November 6, 1993 – March 18, 1994	0
22	(United States) Leavander Johnson	March 18, 1994 – August 1994	0
23	(United States) Stevie Johnston	May 2, 1995 – February 1997	3
24	(United States) Jesse James Leija	March 22, 1997 – July 1998^{s}	1
25	(United States) Golden Johnson	July 26, 1998 – October 16, 1998	0
26	(United States) Israel Cardona	October 16, 1998 – February 1999	0
27	(United States) Golden Johnson (2)	May 14, 1999 – August 1999	0
28	(United States) Ivan Robinson	September 3, 1999 – March 2000^{r}	0
29	(United States) Juan Lazcano	June 16, 2000 – February 2003	4
30	(United States) Steve Quinonez	March 23, 2003 – May 4, 2003	0
31	(United States) Michael Clark	May 4, 2003 – October 2004	1
32	(United States) Eleazer Contreras Jr.	November 6, 2004 – May 2005	0
33	(Mexico) José Santa Cruz	June 10, 2005 – August 26, 2005	0
34	(Mexico) Fernando Trejo	August 26, 2005 – December 2005	0
35	(Mexico) José Santa Cruz (2)	January 6, 2006 – May 2006^{r}	1
36	(The Bahamas) Edner Cherry	August 12, 2006 – March 2007	0
37	(Kyrgyzstan) Kid Diamond	March 10, 2007 – July 2007	1
38	(Mexico) Miguel Ángel Huerta	August 30, 2007 – March 14, 2008	1
39	(Mexico) Javier Jáuregui	March 14, 2008 – July 2008	0
40	(United States) Jason Litzau	August 15, 2009 – October 2009^{r}	0
41	(Mexico) Martín Honorio	November 28, 2009 – January 2010	0
42	(United States) Brandon Ríos	February 6, 2010 – January 2011^{r}	0
43	(United States) Henry Lundy	April 1, 2011 – July 27, 2012	2
44	(Mexico) Ray Beltrán	July 27, 2012 – July 2013^{r}	1
45	(Canada) Gishlain Maduma	September 6, 2013 – April 2014	1
46	(Canada) Dierry Jean	June 13, 2014 – August 2015^{r}	2
47	(Mexico) Marvin Quintero	September 18, 2015 – May 5, 2016^{s}	0
48	(Russia) Petr Petrov	May 6, 2016 – September 2016	0
49	(Mexico) Ray Beltrán (2)	December 10, 2016 – January 2018^{r}	2
50	(United States) Teófimo López	December 8, 2018 – November 2019^{r}	2
51	(Mexico) Oscar Duarte	March 7, 2020 – January 2022	0
52	(United States) Jamaine Ortiz	February 18, 2022 - October 29, 2022	1
53	(United States) Raymond Muratalla	May 20, 2023 - April 2025	2
54	(United States) Abdullah Mason	April 5, 2025 - August 2025	1
55	(Canada) Luis Santana	April 9, 2026 - October 8, 2026	0
56	(Canada) Dzmitry Asanau	October 8, 2026 - Present	0

== Super featherweight ==
No.	Name	Duration of reign	Defences
1	(Cuba) Frankie Otero	June 1, 1971 – May 19, 1972	1
2	(Mexico) Jose Luis Lopez	May 19, 1972 – July 21, 1972	0
3	(Dominican Republic) Jose Fernandez	July 21, 1972 – August 28, 1972	0
4	(United States) Walter Seeley	August 28, 1972 – March 9, 1973	0
5	(United States) Sammy Goss	March 9, 1973 – April 1973	0
6	(United States) Ray Lunny III	March 17, 1975 – September 1976	1
7	(Mexico) Rafael Limón	March 4, 1978 – November 1980^{r}	2
8	(Ecuador) Hector Cortez	December 5, 1980 – 1981	0
9	(Philippines) Rolando Navarrete	May 19, 1981 – August 1981^{r}	0
10	(United States) Blaine Dickson	September 15, 1981 – December 11, 1981	0
11	(Puerto Rico) Héctor Camacho	December 11, 1981 – July 1983	1
12	(United States) Guy Villegas	March 9, 1984 – December 7, 1984	0
13	(United States) Dennis Cruz	December 7, 1984 – May 15, 1985	0
14	(United States) Dwight Pratchett	May 15, 1985 – January 17, 1987	1
15	(Colombia) Mario Miranda	January 17, 1987 – November 1987	1
16	(United States) Nicky Perez	December 4, 1987 – August 13, 1988	0
17	(Puerto Rico) Juan Laporte	August 13, 1988 – October 1990^{r}	3
18	(Mexico) Gabriel Ruelas	July 31, 1991 – August 1992	2
19	(Mexico) Narciso Valenzuela Romo	September 28, 1992 – January 30, 1993	3
20	(El Salvador) Frank Avelar	January 30, 1993 – April 1993	0
21	(United States) Eddie Hopson	January 4, 1994 – April 1995^{r}	2
22	(United States) Robert Garcia	April 21, 1995 – February 1996	1
23	(Mexico) Jesús Chávez	March 3, 1997 – December 1998	5
24	(Cuba) Joel Casamayor	January 30, 1999 – April 1999	0
25	(Mexico) Jesús Chávez (2)	May 22, 1999 – March 2000	3
26	(Australia) Robbie Peden	March 5, 2000 – June 25, 2000	0
27	(United States) John Brown	June 25, 2000 – November 2000^{r}	0
28	(Uganda) Justin Juuko	January 21, 2001 – April 22, 2001	0
29	(Mexico) Ernesto Zepeda	April 22, 2001 – June 2001	0
30	(Puerto Rico) Daniel Alicea	April 12, 2002 – September 14, 2002	0
31	(United States) Nate Campbell	September 14, 2002 – November 2003	0
32	(Mexico) Alejandro Medina	May 30, 2005 – 2005	0
33	(Mexico) Fernando Trejo	March 3, 2006 – September 1, 2006	1
34	(Brazil) Agnaldo Nunes	September 1, 2006 – August 2007	1
35	(Cuba) Yuriorkis Gamboa	February 22, 2008 – May 2008	0
36	(Mexico) Urbano Antillón	September 5, 2008 – June 2009	0
37	(Mexico) Alejandro Sanabria	August 21, 2009 – October 2009	1
38	(United States) Jason Litzau	November 4, 2009 – November 2010	1
39	(United States) Diego Magdaleno	January 22, 2011 – March 2013^{r}	5
40	(Mexico) Francisco Vargas	August 9, 2013 – October 2015^{r}	3
41	(United States) Tevin Farmer	March 30, 2016 – November 2017^{r}	1
42	(United States) Ryan García	May 4, 2018 – August 2018	0
43	(Mexico) Abraham Montoya	April 13, 2019 – October 2019^{r}	0
44	(Mexico) Eliot Chavez	March 5, 2021 - August 2021	0
45	(Dominican Republic) Eridson Garcia	August 26, 2021 - August 4, 2023	2
46	(United States) Jordan White	August 4, 2023 - August 2025	3
47	(United States) Iman Lee	April 18, 2026 - Present	0

== Featherweight ==
No.	Name	Duration of reign	Defences
1	(Venezuela) Antonio Gómez	September 5, 1970 – July 1971	0
2	(United States) Sammy Goss	August 10, 1971 – January 1972	0
3	(United States) Phil Hudson	February 17, 1972 – October 1972	0
4	(Mexico) Rubén Olivares	June 23, 1973 – September 1973	0
5	(United States) Ronnie McGarvey	June 21, 1977 – March 18, 1978	1
6	(United States) Mike Ayala	March 18, 1978 – June 1979	1
7	(United States) Nicky Perez	November 11, 1980 – June 22, 1982	1
8	(United States) Jackie Beard	June 22, 1982 – 1985	3
9	(United States) Joe Ruelaz	September 25, 1985 – September 12, 1986	0
10	(United States) Bernard Taylor	September 12, 1986 – February 1989	3
11	(United States) Harold Rhodes	March 17, 1989 – August 10, 1989	0
12	(United States) Troy Dorsey	August 10, 1989 – February 1991	1
13	(Mexico) Rafael Ruelas	March 31, 1991 – June 1991	0
14	(United States) Joe Martinez	August 12, 1991 – March 3, 1992	0
15	(United States) Jesse James Leija	March 3, 1992 – September 1993^{r}	1
16	(United States) Mario Gongoria	May 11, 1994 – August 1994	0
17	(Mexico) Manuel Medina	September 26, 1994 – January 1995^{r}	0
18	(United States) Harold Warren	February 18, 1995 – June 24, 1995	0
19	(United States) Derrick Gainer	June 24, 1995 – January 1996	1
20	(United States) Robert Garcia	March 23, 1996 – June 1996	0
21	(Mexico) Jesús Chávez	August 9, 1996 – October 1996^{r}	0
22	(United States) Robert Garcia	April 21, 1995 – February 1996	1
23	(Mexico) Jesús Chávez	March 3, 1997 – December 1998	5
24	(Mexico) Jose Luis Noyola	November 24, 1996 – August 9, 1997	1
25	(United States) Lewis Wood	August 9, 1997 – 1999	2
26	(United States) Redford Beasley	December 3, 1998 – 1999	0
27	(United States) David Vazquez	February 25, 2000 – August 2000^{r}	0
28	(Australia) Robbie Peden	October 21, 2000 – March 9, 2002	2
29	(Mexico) Juan Manuel Márquez	March 9, 2002 – February 2003^{r}	0
30	(Mexico) Héctor Javier Márquez	March 28, 2003 – June 13, 2003	0
31	(Mexico) Juan Carlos Ramírez	June 13, 2003 – June 3, 2004	1
32	(United States) Jorge Martinez	June 3, 2004 – September 16, 2004	0
33	(Mexico) César Figueroa	September 16, 2004 – December 9, 2004	0
34	(United States) Robert Guerrero	December 9, 2004 – December 2, 2005	2
35	(Mexico) Gamaliel Díaz	December 2, 2005 – June 23, 2006	1
36	(United States) Robert Guerrero (2)	June 23, 2006 – September 2006^{r}	0
37	(United States) Juan Ruiz	June 20, 2008 – December 2008	0
38	(Mexico) Ricardo Castillo	January 31, 2009 – March 2009	0
39	(Mexico) Daniel Ponce de León	April 25, 2009 – August 2009	0
40	(United States) Matt Remillard	September 19, 2009 – March 26, 2011	2
41	(United States) Mikey Garcia	March 26, 2011 – December 2012	3
42	(United States) Ronny Rios	January 12, 2013 – June 2013	0
43	(Philippines) Marvin Sonsona	June 7, 2014 – June 2015	0
44	(United States) Joseph Diaz	December 18, 2015 – April 2018^{r}	6
45	(United States) Manny Robles III	June 14, 2018 – October 2019^{r}	2
46	(United States) Adam Lopez	June 11, 2020 – June 19, 2021	1
47	(United Kingdom) Isaac Dogboe	June 19, 2021 - July 2022	1
48	(United States) Bruce Carrington	February 16, 2024 - July 2025	3
49	(Mexico) Rene Palacios	January 30, 2026 - July 2026	0
50	(United States) Albert Gonzalez	July 18, 2026 - Present	1
