= Cruiserweight Championship =

Cruiserweight Championship may refer to:

- NXT Cruiserweight Championship
- List of cruiserweight boxing champions
- List of major cruiserweight professional wrestling championships
- A cruiserweight competition is a type of competitive running sport which takes place on sailing boats.
