= Al Cole =

American boxer (born 1964)

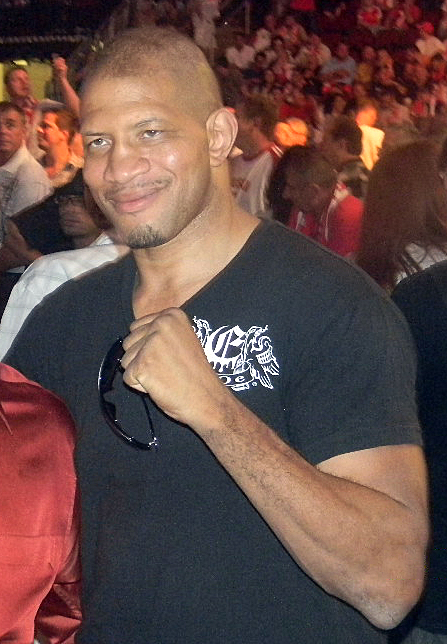
- Cole in 2010

Personal information
- Nickname: Ice
- Nationality: American
- Born: Alfred Rudolph Cole; April 21, 1964 (age 62) Atlantic City, New Jersey, U.S.
- Height: 6 ft 4 in (1.93 m)
- Weight: Cruiserweight; Heavyweight

Boxing career
- Reach: 80 in (203 cm)
- Stance: Orthodox

Boxing record
- Total fights: 54
- Wins: 35
- Win by KO: 16
- Losses: 16
- Draws: 3

Alfred Rudolph Cole (born April 21, 1964), best known as Al Cole, is an American former professional boxer who competed from 1989 to 2011. He held the International Boxing Federation (IBF) cruiserweight world title from 1992 to 1996, making five successful title defenses.

== Professional career ==
=== Cruiserweight ===
Cole, at 6'4", was a large and dominant cruiserweight boxer. Later in his career, he did not have the size or power to compete at the upper echelon of the heavyweight division when he moved up in weight class. He listed his hometown as Spring Valley, New York. Cole began his career on a 20-1 tear and captured the cruiserweight title by defeating IBF world champ James Warring after only three years as a professional. Cole went on to defend the title five times. His most notable defenses came against Uriah Grant, a fighter who beat Thomas Hearns. Cole defeated Grant twice by unanimous decision. Throughout his career, Al Cole has appeared in movies with several big actors such as Robert De Niro, Will Smith, John Voight, Jamie Foxx, Jeffrey Wright and Catherine Zeta-Jones. In one of the movies Al Cole appeared in, Ali, people got knocked out during the audition. Cole stated, "People really got knocked out auditioning for the movie roles."

=== Heavyweight ===
Cole went up to heavyweight without losing his title. In his first heavyweight fight, Cole was nearly swept on all cards by Tim Witherspoon in a unanimous decision loss. A year later, Cole was TKO'd by Michael Grant in the 10th round. Cole then had brief success by drawing over ten rounds with up and coming, undefeated prospect Kirk Johnson. Johnson was to win the rematch via unanimous decision, a loss which began Cole's career downfall. He went on to lose to Corrie Sanders and Jameel McCline. Cole's career then had a brief resurgence in 2002 and 2003 with a victory over undefeated Vincent Maddalone, a unanimous decision over David Izonritei, and a draw with Jeremy Williams. Cole failed to build on the momentum though, dropping decisions to Lance Whitaker, former heavyweight champion Hasim Rahman, and finally a TKO loss to Sultan Ibragimov. Cole then retired, but returned to defeat heavyweight prospect Joey "Minnesota Ice" Abell on September 5, 2008 in Sweden. A year later, he was defeated by fringe contender Timur Ibragimov. Cole had scheduled to fight a rematch with Abell in 2010 in Uganda, but that bout fell through. Reflecting on his long career in boxing, Cole noted. "I gave people what they wanted to see-an action-packed fight."

== Training career ==
Cole is now a professional boxing trainer. He has trained USBA Heavyweight Champion Maurice Harris for Boxing 360.

== Professional boxing record ==
| 54 fights | 35 wins | 16 losses |
|---|---|---|
| By knockout | 16 | 4 |
| By decision | 19 | 12 |
| Draws | 3 | |

Key to abbreviations used for results
| DQ | Disqualification | RTD | Corner retirement |
| KO | Knockout | SD | Split decision / split draw |
| MD | Majority decision / majority draw | TD | Technical decision / technical draw |
| NC | No contest | TKO | Technical knockout |
| PTS | Points decision | UD | Unanimous decision / unanimous draw |

Boxing record
| No. | Result | Record | Opponent | Type | Round(s), time | Date | Location | Notes |
|---|---|---|---|---|---|---|---|---|
| 54 | Loss | 35–16–3 | Danny Williams | SD | 6 | Sep 3, 2011 | Karlstad CCC, Karlstad, Sweden | |
| 53 | Loss | 35–15–3 | Timur Ibragimov | UD | 6 | Sep 4, 2009 | Löfbergs Arena, Karlstad, Sweden | |
| 52 | Win | 35–14–3 | Joey Abell | SD | 6 | Sep 5, 2008 | Nojesfabriken, Karlstad, Sweden | |
| 51 | Loss | 34–14–3 | Sultan Ibragimov | TKO | 3 (12), 1:46 | Mar 3, 2005 | Madison Square Garden Theater, New York City, New York, U.S. | For WBO Asia Pacific heavyweight title |
| 50 | Loss | 34–13–3 | Hasim Rahman | UD | 10 | Mar 11, 2004 | Michael's Eighth Avenue, Glen Burnie, Maryland, U.S. | |
| 49 | Loss | 34–12–3 | Lance Whitaker | UD | 12 | Oct 30, 2003 | Seminole Casino, Coconut Creek, Florida, U.S. | For NABA heavyweight title |
| 48 | Win | 34–11–3 | Joe Lenhart | UD | 6 | Aug 22, 2003 | Hilton Hotel, Las Vegas, Nevada, U.S. | |
| 47 | Win | 33–11–3 | David Izonritei | UD | 8 | Mar 1, 2003 | Thomas & Mack Center, Las Vegas, Nevada, U.S. | |
| 46 | Draw | 32–11–3 | Jeremy Williams | PTS | 10 | Jan 30, 2003 | Rose Garden, Portland, Oregon, U.S. | |
| 45 | Loss | 32–11–2 | Sedreck Fields | UD | 10 | Aug 31, 2002 | Strawberry Field, Bridgehampton, New York, U.S. | |
| 44 | Win | 32–10–2 | Vinny Maddalone | UD | 6 | Jun 29, 2002 | Etess Arena, Atlantic City, New Jersey, U.S. | |
| 43 | Loss | 31–10–2 | Sherman Williams | UD | 10 | Jan 26, 2002 | Madison Square Garden Theater, New York City, New York, U.S. | |
| 42 | Loss | 31–9–2 | Juan Carlos Gómez | TKO | 6 (8), 1:10 | Aug 4, 2001 | Mandalay Bay Events Center, Las Vegas, Nevada, U.S. | |
| 41 | Loss | 31–8–2 | Jameel McCline | UD | 10 | May 25, 2001 | Scope Arena, Norfolk, Virginia, U.S. | |
| 40 | Loss | 31–7–2 | David Bostice | UD | 10 | Dec 8, 2000 | Hard Rock Hotel and Casino, Las Vegas, Nevada, U.S. | |
| 39 | Loss | 31–6–2 | Terrence Lewis | UD | 10 | Sep 14, 2000 | Hammerstein Ballroom, New York City, New York, U.S. | |
| 38 | Draw | 31–5–2 | Frankie Swindell | PTS | 10 | Apr 27, 2000 | Hammerstein Ballroom, New York City, New York, U.S. | |
| 37 | Loss | 31–5–1 | Corrie Sanders | TKO | 1 (12), 1:03 | Feb 19, 2000 | Carnival City, Brakpan, Gauteng, South Africa | For WBU heavyweight title |
| 36 | Win | 31–4–1 | Brian Nix | TKO | 8 (10), 2:25 | Nov 29, 1999 | Molson Centre, Montreal, Quebec, Canada | |
| 35 | Loss | 30–4–1 | Kirk Johnson | UD | 10 | Mar 20, 1999 | Emerald Queen Casino, Tacoma, Washington, U.S. | |
| 34 | Draw | 30–3–1 | Kirk Johnson | PTS | 10 | Dec 8, 1998 | Roseland Ballroom, New York City, New York, U.S. | |
| 33 | Win | 30–3 | Derrick Roddy | TKO | 3 (10), 2:23 | Sep 4, 1998 | Taj Majal Hotel & Casino, Atlantic City, New Jersey, U.S. | |
| 32 | Win | 29–3 | Carlos Monroe | UD | 10 | May 8, 1998 | Trump Marina Hotel Casino, Atlantic City, New Jersey, U.S. | |
| 31 | Loss | 28–3 | Michael Grant | RTD | 10 (12), 3:00 | Jun 20, 1997 | Ballys Park Place Hotel Casino, Atlantic City, New Jersey, U.S. | For IBC heavyweight title |
| 30 | Win | 28–2 | Matthew Charleston | KO | 1 (10) | Nov 22, 1996 | Ice Palace, Tampa, Florida, U.S. | |
| 29 | Loss | 27–2 | Tim Witherspoon | UD | 10 | Jan 12, 1996 | Madison Square Garden, New York City, New York, U.S. | |
| 28 | Win | 27–1 | Uriah Grant | UD | 12 | Jun 24, 1995 | Convention Center, Atlantic City, New Jersey, U.S. | Retained IBF cruiserweight title |
| 27 | Win | 26–1 | Mike Dixon | TKO | 8 (12), 3:00 | Mar 18, 1995 | Pensacola Civic Center, Pensacola, Florida, U.S. | |
| 26 | Win | 25–1 | Nate Miller | UD | 12 | Jul 23, 1994 | Bismarck Civic Center, Bismarck, North Dakota, U.S. | Retained IBF cruiserweight title |
| 25 | Win | 24–1 | Vincent Boulware | TKO | 5 (12), 1:08 | Nov 17, 1993 | Caesars Hotel & Casino, Atlantic City, New Jersey, U.S. | Retained IBF cruiserweight title |
| 24 | Win | 23–1 | Glenn McCrory | UD | 12 | Jul 16, 1993 | CSKA Moscow, Moscow, Russia | Retained IBF cruiserweight title |
| 23 | Win | 22–1 | Uriah Grant | UD | 12 | Feb 28, 1993 | Trump Castle, Atlantic City, New Jersey, U.S. | Retained IBF cruiserweight title |
| 22 | Win | 21–1 | James Warring | UD | 12 | Jul 30, 1992 | Waterloo Village, Stanhope, New Jersey, U.S. | Won IBF cruiserweight title |
| 21 | Win | 20–1 | Govoner Chavers | TKO | 6 (10), 1:42 | Dec 12, 1991 | Taj Majal Hotel & Casino, Atlantic City, New Jersey, U.S. | |
| 20 | Win | 19–1 | Mike DeVito | TKO | 3 (10), 3:00 | Sep 25, 1991 | Waterloo Village, Stanhope, New Jersey, U.S. | |
| 19 | Win | 18–1 | Frankie Swindell | TKO | 11 (12), 2:08 | Jul 25, 1991 | Taj Majal Hotel & Casino, Atlantic City, New Jersey, U.S. | Retained USBA cruiserweight title |
| 18 | Win | 17–1 | Nate Miller | UD | 12 | May 9, 1991 | Essex County College, Newark, New Jersey, U.S. | Retained USBA cruiserweight title |
| 17 | Win | 16–1 | Leon Taylor | UD | 12 | Mar 8, 1991 | Taj Majal Hotel & Casino, Atlantic City, New Jersey, U.S. | Won USBA cruiserweight title |
| 16 | Loss | 15–1 | Leon Taylor | SD | 10 | Dec 13, 1990 | Penta Hotel, New York City, New York, U.S. | |
| 15 | Win | 15–0 | Matthew Brooks | TKO | 4 (8), 1:09 | Sep 27, 1990 | Waterloo Village, Stanhope, New Jersey, U.S. | |
| 14 | Win | 14–0 | Jesse Shelby | UD | 10 | Aug 5, 1990 | Convention Center, Atlantic City, New Jersey, U.S. | |
| 13 | Win | 13–0 | Keith McMurray | UD | 8 | Jun 24, 1990 | Convention Center, Atlantic City, New Jersey, U.S. | |
| 12 | Win | 12–0 | Chris Collins | TKO | 5 (?) | Jun 12, 1990 | Fort Bragg, North Carolina, U.S. | |
| 11 | Win | 11–0 | Tommy Richardson | TKO | 5 (8) | May 3, 1990 | Quality Inn Hotel, Newark, New Jersey, U.S. | |
| 10 | Win | 10–0 | Jerry Dorsey | TKO | 3 (8), 1:18 | Mar 22, 1990 | Trump Plaza Hotel and Casino, Atlantic City, New Jersey, U.S. | |
| 9 | Win | 9–0 | Ed Mack | UD | 6 | Jan 7, 1990 | Tropicana Hotel & Casino, Atlantic City, New Jersey, U.S. | |
| 8 | Win | 8–0 | Luis Castillo | TKO | 3 (6) | Nov 14, 1989 | South Mountain Arena, West Orange, New Jersey, U.S. | |
| 7 | Win | 7–0 | Harrison Pearson | KO | 5 (?) | Oct 20, 1989 | Resorts Casino Hotel, Atlantic City, New Jersey, U.S. | |
| 6 | Win | 6–0 | Drake Thadzi | PTS | 6 | Sep 12, 1989 | Showboat Hotel & Casino, Las Vegas, Nevada, U.S. | |
| 5 | Win | 5–0 | John Beckles | TKO | 4 (?) | Aug 15, 1989 | South Mountain Arena, West Orange, New Jersey, U.S. | |
| 4 | Win | 4–0 | Aundrey Nelson | PTS | 4 | Jun 24, 1989 | Convention Center, Atlantic City, New Jersey, U.S. | |
| 3 | Win | 3–0 | Jack Basting | MD | 4 | May 27, 1989 | Bismarck Civic Center, Bismarck, North Dakota, U.S. | |
| 2 | Win | 2–0 | Guy Sonnenberg | UD | 4 | Apr 25, 1989 | Showboat Hotel & Casino, Las Vegas, Nevada, U.S. | |
| 1 | Win | 1–0 | Lorenzo Thomas | TKO | 3 (4), 1:06 | Mar 25, 1989 | Hilton Hotel, Las Vegas, Nevada, U.S. | |

== Filmography ==
| Year | Title | Role | Notes |
|---|---|---|---|
| 2001 | Ali | Ernie Terrell | |

== See also ==
- List of world cruiserweight boxing champions

Sporting positions
Regional boxing titles
| Vacant Title last held by Jeff Lampkin | IBF–USBA cruiserweight title March 8, 1991 – July 30, 1992; Won world title | Vacant Title next held by Arthur Williams |
World boxing titles
| Preceded by James Warring | IBF cruiserweight champion July 30, 1992 - 1996; Vacated | Vacant Title next held by Adolpho Washington |
