= Orlin Norris =

American boxer

Personal information
- Nickname: Night Train/The Juice
- Nationality: American
- Born: Orlin Levance Norris; October 4, 1965 (age 60) Lubbock, Texas, U.S.
- Height: 5 ft 9 1/2 in (177 cm)
- Weight: Cruiserweight; Heavyweight

Boxing career
- Reach: 70 in (178 cm)
- Stance: Orthodox

Boxing record
- Total fights: 70
- Wins: 57
- Win by KO: 30
- Losses: 10
- Draws: 1
- No contests: 2

Orlin Levance Norris (born October 4, 1965) is an American former professional boxer who competed from 1986 to 2005. He held the WBA cruiserweight title from 1993 to 1995. As an amateur, he won the National Golden Gloves title. He is the brother of retired former champion Terry Norris.

== Professional career ==
=== Heavyweight contender ===
Norris turned pro in 1986 as a heavyweight and became a highly ranked and much avoided contender. In 1988 he won the NABF heavyweight title with a decision over the towering Larry Alexander, and followed it up with more easy points wins over respected challengers Renaldo Snipes, Jesse Ferguson, and ex-world champion Greg Page (boxer).

Page had been considered as an opponent for Evander Holyfield; however, after defeating Page, the shot was not offered to Norris. In 1990 he was outboxed by crafty ex-world champion Tony Tubbs (a decision later changed to a no-decision after Tubbs tested positive for an illegal substance), and followed up that momentum killer with a further loss, an 8th-round TKO to hard hitting Bert Cooper, where Norris was decked in the 8th round and twisted his knee, unable to continue.

In 1990 Norris regained some ground by beating future world champion Oliver McCall by split decision, and in 1991 regained his NABF title with a first-round knockout of Lionel Washington. He defended the title against ex-world champion Tony Tucker; however, he lost on a controversial split decision, after it appeared Norris had outboxed his giant opponent rather easily.

=== Cruiserweight World Champion ===
After the Tucker performance, Norris struggled to find contenders who would risk fighting him, and was forced to move down a division, into the cruiserweights. Having won the USBA belt in that division, in 1993 Norris beat Marcelo Victor Figueroa to capture the vacant WBA cruiserweight title and went on to successfully defend the title five times, including two wins over Arthur Williams and a victory over Adolpho Washington (two future world champs). Norris also retained his WBA Cruiserweight title in Mexico with a crushing win over fellow American James Heath.

In 1995 the weight draining caught up with Norris, as a very sluggish, strange performance saw him lose his belt to Nate Miller via 8th-round KO in London, England. Norris was hospitalised after the fight although he checked himself out the following morning.

=== Return to heavyweight ===
In 1996 he moved back up to heavyweight and scored a revenge win over an aging Tony Tucker. However, a long legal battle with Don King saw him lose his WBA mandatory #1 challenger status and instead of a challenge to King-promoted champion Evander Holyfield, Norris was forced to fight 6'7" King-managed heavyweight Henry Akinwande in an eliminator. Akinwande stayed at long range and scraped a decision over Norris. Once again a heavyweight title fight escaped Norris.

In 1999 he travelled to the UK and demolished colourful prospect Pele Reid in one round, but Herbie Hide pulled out of a WBO title fight with Norris at the last minute.

Norris fought Mike Tyson in 1999. After the first round ended, Tyson knocked Norris down with a left hook and Norris injured his knee when he went down, although he walked back to his corner in a normal manner, showing no discomfort. Norris said he was unable to continue the fight and the bout was ruled a no contest. After the fight, Norris received an MRI scan at the Valley Hospital Medical Center and was diagnosed with a dislocated kneecap. Nevada State Athletic Commission physician Dr. Flip Homansky confirmed that the scan "clearly shows the path his kneecap took" as he fell and then got back up, popping it back into place. Tyson accused Norris of throwing the match. Norris was an aging fighter by the time he came back in 2000, outscored by Andrew Golota, and in 2001 making little effort and collapsing in sixty seconds against Vitali Klitschko in Germany, and losing a 12-round decision to Brian Nielsen in Denmark for the IBO title.

In 2005, he scored a draw with former champion Vassiliy Jirov, injecting some life back into his career.

== Professional boxing record ==
70 fights	57 wins	10 losses
By knockout	30	4
By decision	27	6
Draws	1	
No contests	2	

No.	Result	Record	Opponent	Type	Round, time	Date	Location	Notes
70	Loss	57–10–1 (2)	(United Kingdom) Ola Afolabi	KO	7 (8)	03/11/2005	(United States) 4th and B, San Diego, California, U.S.	
69	Draw	57–9–1 (2)	(Kazakhstan) Vassiliy Jirov	MD	8	21/07/2005	(United States) Palace Indian Gaming Center, Lemoore, California, U.S.	
68	Loss	57–9 (2)	(Poland) Albert Sosnowski	MD	8	28/05/2005	(United States) Staples Center, Los Angeles, California U.S.	
67	Win	57–8 (2)	(United States) Ken Murphy	TKO	6 (8)	01/10/2004	(United States) Spotlight 29 Casino, Coachella, California, U.S.	
66	Win	56–8 (2)	(United States) Mike Peak	UD	8	19/06/2004	(United States) Home Depot Center, Carson, California, U.S.	
65	Win	55–8 (2)	(Brazil) Roberto Coelho	UD	8	13/05/2004	(United States) Sports Arena, San Diego, California, U.S.	
64	Win	54–8 (2)	(United States) Troy Weida	TKO	3 (10)	13/06/2003	(United States) Chinook Winds Casino, Lincoln City, Oregon, U.S.	
63	Win	53–8 (2)	(United States) Harry Funmaker	TKO	5 (10)	15/03/2003	(United States) Ho-Chunk Casino, Baraboo, Wisconsin, U.S.	
62	Loss	52–8 (2)	(Denmark) Brian Nielsen	UD	12	16/06/2001	Brøndbyhallen, Copenhagen, Denmark	For IBC Heavyweight title
61	Win	52–7 (2)	(United States) Brian Yates	UD	8	24/04/2001	(United States) Fairgrounds, Indianapolis, Indiana, U.S.	
60	Loss	51–7 (2)	(Ukraine) Vitali Klitschko	KO	1 (12)	27/01/2001	Rudi-Sedlmayer-Halle, Munich, Germany	For vacant WBA Inter-Continental Heavyweight title
59	Win	51–6 (2)	(United States) Bradley Rone	UD	10	02/11/2000	(United States) Coeur d'Alene Casino, Worley, Idaho, U.S.	
58	Loss	50–6 (2)	(Poland) Andrew Golota	UD	10	16/06/2000	(United States) Mandalay Bay Events Center, Paradise, Nevada, U.S.	
57	NC	50–5 (2)	(United States) Mike Tyson	NC	1 (10)	23/10/1999	(United States) MGM Grand Garden Arena, Paradise, Nevada, U.S.	
56	Win	50–5 (1)	(United Kingdom) Pelé Reid	KO	1 (8)	26/06/1999	(United Kingdom) London Arena, Millwall, London, U.K.	
55	Win	49–5 (1)	(United States) Nate Miller	UD	12	06/08/1998	(United States) Grand Casino Avoyelles, Marksville, Louisiana, U.S.	Retained IBA super cruiserweight title
54	Win	48–5 (1)	(United States) Adolpho Washington	UD	12	22/05/1998	(United States) Glen Stock Arena, Monroe, Michigan, U.S.	Won vacant IBA super cruiserweight title
53	Loss	47–5 (1)	(United Kingdom) Henry Akinwande	UD	12	13/12/1997	(United States) Amphitheater, Pompano Beach, Florida, U.S.	
52	Win	47–4 (1)	(United States) Marion Wilson	SD	10	14/11/1996	(United States) Michael's Eighth Avenue, Glen Burnie, Maryland, U.S.	
51	Win	46–4 (1)	(United States) Jeff Pegues	KO	1 (?)	12/10/1996	Forum di Assago, Milan, Italy	
50	Win	45–4 (1)	(United States) Tony Tucker	SD	10	24/02/1996	(United States) Richmond Coliseum, Richmond, Virginia, U.S.	
49	Win	44–4 (1)	(United States) Cleveland Woods	RTD	6 (10)	10/02/1996	(United States) MGM Grand Garden Arena, Paradise, Nevada, U.S.	
48	Loss	43–4 (1)	(United States) Nate Miller	KO	8 (12)	22/07/1995	(United Kingdom) London Arena, Millwall, London, U.K.	Lost WBA cruiserweight title
47	Win	43–3 (1)	(United States) Adolpho Washington	UD	12	17/03/1995	(United States) Memorial Auditorium, Worcester, Massachusetts, U.S.	Retained WBA cruiserweight title
46	Win	42–3 (1)	(United States) James Heath	KO	2 (12)	12/11/1994	Plaza de Toros, Mexico City, Mexico	Retained WBA cruiserweight title
45	Win	41–3 (1)	(United States) Arthur Williams	TKO	3 (12)	02/07/1994	(United States) The Mirage, Paradise, Nevada, U.S.	Retained WBA cruiserweight title
44	Win	40–3 (1)	(United States) Arthur Williams	SD	12	04/03/1994	(United States) MGM Grand Garden Arena, Paradise, Nevada, U.S.	Retained WBA cruiserweight title
43	Win	39–3 (1)	(United States) Art Jimmerson	TKO	4 (?)	09/01/1994	(United States) Del Mar Fairgrounds, Del Mar, California, U.S.	
42	Win	38–3 (1)	(Argentina) Marcelo Victor Figueroa	TKO	6 (12)	06/11/1993	Cirque d'hiver, Paris, France	Won vacant WBA cruiserweight title
41	Win	37–3 (1)	(United States) Jack Basting	TKO	4 (10)	19/08/1993	(United States) Mathewson Exhibition Center, Sedalia, Missouri, U.S.	The bout was stopped due to Basting's badly swollen left eye.
40	Win	36–3 (1)	(United States) Richard Mason	UD	12	23/04/1993	(United States) The Pyramid, Memphis, Tennessee, U.S.	Retained NABF Cruiserweight title
39	Win	35–3 (1)	(United States) Troy Jefferson	TKO	2 (8)	06/02/1993	(United States) Sports Arena, San Diego, California, U.S.	
38	Win	34–3 (1)	(United States) David Sewell	TKO	5 (12)	25/11/1992	(United States) Riviera Hotel & Casino, Winchester, Nevada, U.S.	Retained NABF Cruiserweight title
37	Win	33–3 (1)	(United States) Keith McMurray	KO	2 (?)	27/05/1992	(United States) Sports Arena, San Diego, California, U.S.	
36	Win	32–3 (1)	(United States) Anthony Hembrick	TKO	8 (12)	25/03/1992	(United States) Sports Arena, San Diego, California, U.S.	Retained NABF Cruiserweight title
35	Win	31–3 (1)	(United States) James Pritchard	PTS	8	13/12/1991	Palais Omnisport de Paris-Bercy, Bercy, Paris, France	
34	Win	30–3 (1)	(United States) Jesse Shelby	TD	10 (12)	17/08/1991	(United States) Sports Arena, San Diego, California, U.S.	Won vacant NABF Cruiserweight title
33	Loss	29–3 (1)	(United States) Tony Tucker	SD	12	03/06/1991	(United States) Caesars Palace, Paradise, Nevada, U.S.	Lost NABF heavyweight title
32	Win	29–2 (1)	(United States) Lionel Washington	TKO	1 (12)	30/04/1991	(United States) Country Club, Reseda, California, U.S.	Won vacant NABF heavyweight title
31	Win	28–2 (1)	(United States) Jamie Howe	TKO	7 (10)	09/02/1991	(United States) Madison Square Garden, New York, U.S.	
30	Win	27–2 (1)	(United States) Tony Willis	RTD	9 (10)	11/12/1990	(United States) Country Club, Reseda, California, U.S.	
29	Win	26–2 (1)	(United States) Oliver McCall	SD	10	17/11/1990	(United States) Lee County Civic Center, Fort Myers, U.S.	
28	Win	25–2 (1)	(United States) Henry Hearns	KO	1 (?)	17/11/1990	(United States) Country Club, Reseda, California, U.S.	
27	Win	24–2 (1)	(United States) Greg Gorrell	TKO	8 (10)	25/09/1990	(United States) Country Club, Reseda, California, U.S.	
26	Win	23–2 (1)	(United States) Danny Wofford	TKO	10 (10)	28/08/1990	(United States) Country Club, Reseda, California, U.S.	
25	Loss	22–2 (1)	(United States) Bert Cooper	TKO	8 (10)	17/02/1990	Northlands Coliseum, Edmonton, Canada	Lost NABF heavyweight title
24	NC	22–1 (1)	(United States) Tony Tubbs	NC	12	21/11/1989	(United States) Civic Auditorium, Santa Monica, California, U.S.	Retained NABF heavyweight title
23	Win	22–1	(United States) Dee Collier	UD	12	01/08/1989	(United States) Showboat Hotel and Casino, Las Vegas, Nevada, U.S.	Retained NABF heavyweight title
22	Win	21–1	(United States) Greg Page	UD	12	25/04/1989	(United States) Showboat Hotel and Casino, Las Vegas, Nevada, U.S.	Retained NABF heavyweight title
21	Win	20–1	(United States) Jesse Ferguson	UD	12	15/11/1988	(United States) El Cortez Hotel, San Diego, California, U.S.	Retained NABF heavyweight title
20	Win	19–1	(United States) Dwain Bonds	UD	12	27/07/1988	(United States) Forum, Inglewood, California, U.S.	Retained NABF heavyweight title
19	Win	18–1	(United States) Andrew Stokes	PTS	10	27/05/1988	(United States) Caesars Palace, Paradise, Nevada, U.S.	
18	Win	17–1	(United States) Renaldo Snipes	UD	12	Mar 19, 1988	(United States) Caesars Palace, Paradise, Nevada, U.S.	Retained NABF heavyweight title
17	Win	16–1	(United States) Woody Clark	KO	1 (10)	23/02/1988	(United States) Country Club, Reseda, California, U.S.	
16	Win	15–1	(United States) Larry Alexander	MD	12	25/11/1987	(United States) Bally's, Paradise, Nevada, U.S.	Won NABF heavyweight title
15	Win	14–1	(United States) Billy Joe Thomas	TKO	3 (?)	04/09/1987	(United States) Bally's, Paradise, Nevada, U.S.	
14	Win	13–1	(United States) John Barbier	KO	1 (10)	13/08/1987	(United States) Forum, Inglewood, California, U.S.	
13	Win	12–1	(United States) Gary Lightbourne	UD	10	27/05/1987	(United States) Showboat Hotel and Casino, Las Vegas, Nevada, U.S.	
12	Win	11–1	(United States) Eddie Richardson	KO	2 (10)	03/04/1987	(United States) Caesars Palace, Paradise, Nevada, U.S.	
11	Win	10–1	(United States) Avery Rawls	PTS	10	20/03/1987	(United States) Showboat Hotel and Casino, Las Vegas, Nevada, U.S.	
10	Win	9–1	(United States) Mike Gans	KO	7 (10)	26/02/1987	(United States) El Cortez Hotel, San Diego, California, U.S.	
9	Win	8–1	(United States) Rufus Hadley	UD	10	12/02/1987	(United States) Showboat Hotel and Casino, Las Vegas, Nevada, U.S.	
8	Win	7–1	(United States) Roger Troupe	KO	2 (6)	05/02/1987	(United States) Raincross Square, Riverside, California, U.S.	
7	Win	6–1	(United States) David Smith	UD	4	21/11/1986	(United States) Country Club, Reseda, California, U.S.	
6	Win	5–1	(United States) Mike Bardwell	UD	6	28/10/1986	(United States) Country Club, Reseda, California, U.S.	
5	Win	4–1	(United States) Ricky Reese	TKO	1 (6)	25/09/1986	(United States) Marriott Hotel, Irvine, California, U.S.	
4	Win	3–1	(United States) Ray Mitchell	UD	4	18/09/1986	(United States) El Cortez Hotel, San Diego, California, U.S.	
3	Loss	2–1	(United States) Olian Alexander	PTS	4	02/08/1986	(United States) Civic Auditorium, San Jose, California, U.S.	
2	Win	2–0	(United States) Levi Billups	KO	1 (4)	25/07/1986	(United States) Jack Murphy Stadium, San Diego, California, U.S.	
1	Win	1–0	(United States) Lionel Washington	KO	3 (?)	16/06/1986	(United States) Civic Auditorium, Bakersfield, California, U.S.	

== See also ==
- List of world cruiserweight boxing champions

Sporting positions
Amateur boxing titles
Previous: Jerry Goff	Golden Gloves; Heavyweight champion 1986	Next: Dave Sherbrooke
Regional boxing titles
Preceded by Larry Alexander	NABF Heavyweight champion November 25, 1987 – February 17, 1990	Succeeded by Bert Cooper
Vacant Title last held by Ray Mercer	NABF Heavyweight champion April 30, 1991 – June 3, 1991	Succeeded by Tony Tucker
Vacant Title last held by James Warring	NABF Cruiserweight champion August 17, 1991 – 1993; Vacated	Vacant Title next held by Thomas Hearns
World boxing titles
Vacant Title last held by Bobby Czyz	WBA Cruiserweight champion November 6, 1993 – July 22, 1995	Next: Nate Miller
