= O'Neil Bell =

Jamaican boxer (1974–2015)

Personal information
- Nicknames: Supernova; Give 'em Hell
- Born: 29 December 1974 Jamaica
- Died: 25 November 2015 (aged 40) Atlanta, Georgia, U.S.
- Height: 6 ft 0 in (183 cm)
- Weight: Cruiserweight

Boxing career
- Reach: 75 in (191 cm)
- Stance: Orthodox

Boxing record
- Total fights: 32
- Wins: 27
- Win by KO: 25
- Losses: 4
- Draws: 1

O'Neil Bell (29 December 1974 – 25 November 2015) was a Jamaican professional boxer who competed from 1998 to 2011. He held the undisputed cruiserweight title in 2006 and the lineal cruiserweight title from 2006 to 2007.

== Professional career ==
Bell lost his second fight against Algerian amateur star (M. Benguesima) but kept winning for years after that. He defeated former IBF champion Arthur Williams twice by KO and climbed the rankings.

He defeated Canadian Dale Brown in a controversial but unanimous decision on May 20, 2005, on Friday Night Fights to capture the vacant IBF title.

He unified the title by beating Frenchman Jean-Marc Mormeck on January 7, 2006, for his WBA and WBC belts, making Bell the second undisputed champion of the division, with Evander Holyfield being the first.

The IBF later stripped Bell in April 2006 for pulling out of a mandatory bout against Steve Cunningham because of a tooth problem. After nearly 11 months of inactivity, Bell was due to take part in the postponed Superfighter Tournament at heavyweight on December 1 of that year.

Bell lost the WBA, WBC and lineal cruiserweight titles to Jean-Marc Mormeck on March 17, 2007 in the Frenchman's backyard in Levallois, France via a close but unanimous decision.

On April 19, 2008, in Poland, Bell fought former WBC light heavyweight champion Tomasz Adamek. Bell was dropped in the first round and quit after the end of round seven, complaining of feeling dizzy and sick.

After the Adamek fight, Bell announced his move to the heavyweight division, saying that making the cruiserweight limit sapped his strength for his last two fights. Bell's first heavyweight bout was scheduled to be against Willie Palms on January 14, 2009, but that fight never occurred.

== Professional boxing record ==
32 fights	27 wins	4 losses
By knockout	25	3
By decision	2	1
Draws	1	

No.	Result	Record	Opponent	Type	Round, time	Date	Location	Notes
32	Win	27–4–1	Rico Cason	TKO	1, 0:58	17 Dec 2011	Smith Gymnasium at Henderson Hall, Arlington, Virginia, US	
31	Loss	26–4–1	Richard Hall	TKO	2 (10), 1:58	4 Jun 2011	Hard Rock Live, Hollywood, Florida, US	
30	Loss	26–3–1	Tomasz Adamek	TKO	8 (12)	19 Apr 2008	Spodek, Katowice, Poland	
29	Loss	26–2–1	Jean-Marc Mormeck	UD	12	17 Mar 2007	Palais des sports Marcel-Cerdan, Levallois-Perret, France	Lost WBA (Unified), WBC, and The Ring cruiserweight titles
28	Win	26–1–1	Jean-Marc Mormeck	KO	10 (12), 2:50	7 Jan 2006	Madison Square Garden, New York City, New York, US	Retained IBF cruiserweight title; Won WBA (Unified), WBC, and The Ring cruiserweight titles
27	Win	25–1–1	Sebastiaan Rothmann	KO	11 (12), 2:09	26 Aug 2005	Hard Rock Live, Hollywood, Florida, US	Retained IBF cruiserweight title
26	Win	24–1–1	Dale Brown	UD	12	20 May 2005	Hard Rock Live, Hollywood, Florida, US	Won vacant IBF cruiserweight title
25	Win	23–1–1	Ezra Sellers	KO	2 (12), 2:04	4 Sep 2004	Mandalay Bay Events Center, Paradise, Nevada, US	
24	Win	22–1–1	Derrick Harmon	TKO	8 (12), 1:41	19 Dec 2003	Ramada Inn, Rosemont, Illinois, US	Retained NABF cruiserweight title
23	Win	21–1–1	Kelvin Davis	TKO	11 (12), 1:03	23 May 2003	Lucky Star Casino, Concho, Oklahoma, US	Retained NABF and USBA cruiserweight titles
22	Win	20–1–1	Arthur Williams	TKO	9 (12), 2:06	8 Nov 2002	Stratosphere, Las Vegas, Nevada, US	Retained NABF cruiserweight title; Won vacant USBA cruiserweight title
21	Win	19–1–1	Eric Davis	TKO	3 (6)	28 Jun 2002	Roxy Theatre, Atlanta, Georgia, US	
20	Draw	18–1–1	Ernest Mateen	TD	3 (10)	26 Apr 2002	Ramada O'Hare, Rosemont, Illinois, US	TD after Mateen was cut from an accidental head clash
19	Win	18–1	Ka-Dy King	TKO	3 (10)	9 Apr 2002	Ramada Inn, Rosemont, Illinois, US	
18	Win	17–1	Arthur Williams	TKO	11 (12), 2:30	7 Sep 2001	Dakota Magic Casino, Hankinson, North Dakota, US	Retained NABF cruiserweight title
17	Win	16–1	Jason Robinson	UD	10	3 Jul 2001	Six Flags Over Georgia, Atlanta, Georgia, US	
16	Win	15–1	Jose Luis Rivera	TKO	11 (12)	10 May 2001	Casino Queen, East St. Louis, Illinois, US	Retained NABF cruiserweight title
15	Win	14–1	James Walton	TKO	10 (12), 1:38	18 Jan 2001	Grand Casino, Biloxi, Mississippi, US	Won vacant NABF cruiserweight title
14	Win	13–1	Michael Rush	KO	5 (12)	19 Oct 2000	Columbus, Georgia, US	Won NBA cruiserweight title
13	Win	12–1	Eric Davis	TKO	2 (10)	13 Oct 2000	Stone Mountain, Georgia, US	
12	Win	11–1	Jose Hiram Torres	TKO	3	2 Jun 2000	Roxy Nightclub, Boston, Massachusetts, US	
11	Win	10–1	John Moore	TKO	3	22 Apr 2000	Atlanta, Georgia, US	
10	Win	9–1	Wes Taylor	TKO	3	27 Jan 2000	Atlanta, Georgia, US	
9	Win	8–1	George Holder	TKO	2 (6), 2:47	3 Sep 1999	Harrah's, Cherokee, North Carolina, US	
8	Win	7–1	Carl Handy	TKO	4	11 Aug 1999	New Orleans, Louisiana, US	
7	Win	6–1	John Battle	KO	2	3 Mar 1999	Atlanta, Georgia, US	
6	Win	5–1	Cliff Nellon	TKO	4 (6), 1:57	22 Jan 1999	Horseshoe Casino, Tunica, Mississippi, US	
5	Win	4–1	John Carter	TKO	1 (4), 2:10	13 Nov 1998	Harrah's, Cherokee, North Carolina, US	
4	Win	3–1	Larry Donnell	TKO	2	30 Jul 1998	Roxy Theatre, Atlanta, Georgia, US	
3	Win	2–1	James Sealey	KO	1	26 Jun 1998	Doraville, Georgia, US	
2	Loss	1–1	Mahamed Benguesmia	KO	4 (6)	11 Apr 1998	Township Auditorium, Columbia, South Carolina, US	
1	Win	1–0	William Holyfield	TKO	1 (4)	19 Feb 1998	World Congress Center, Atlanta, Georgia, US	

=== 2007 disappearance ===
According to ESPN's Wednesday Night Fights on August 8, 2007, Bell, who was originally scheduled to appear, was unavailable to fight and could not be contacted in any way. He was scheduled to appear against Louis Azille on the fight card, but his promoter pulled him from the fight three weeks prior because he could not be located.

=== Death ===
Bell was shot and killed while being robbed in Atlanta, Georgia, on November 25, 2015.

== Titles in boxing ==
=== Major world titles ===
- WBA (Unified) cruiserweight champion (200 lbs)
- WBC cruiserweight champion (200 lbs)
- IBF cruiserweight champion (200 lbs)

=== The Ring magazine titles ===
- The Ring cruiserweight champion (200 lbs)

=== Minor world titles ===
- NBA cruiserweight champion (200 lbs)

=== Regional/International titles ===
- NABF cruiserweight champion (200 lbs)
- USBA cruiserweight champion (200 lbs)

=== Undisputed titles ===
- Undisputed cruiserweight champion

== See also ==
- List of cruiserweight boxing champions
- List of WBA world champions
- List of WBC world champions
- List of IBF world champions
- List of The Ring world champions
- List of undisputed boxing champions

Sporting positions
Regional boxing titles
Vacant Title last held by Wayne Braithwaite	NABF cruiserweight champion 18 January 2001 – June 2004; Vacated	Vacant Title next held by Dale Brown
Vacant Title last held by Kelvin Davis	USBA cruiserweight champion 8 November 2002 – December 2003; Vacated	Vacant Title next held by Felix Cora Jr.
World boxing titles
Vacant Title last held by Kelvin Davis	IBF cruiserweight champion 20 May 2005 – 31 March 2006; Stripped	Vacant Title next held by Krzysztof Włodarczyk
Preceded by Jean-Marc Mormeck	WBA cruiserweight champion Unified title 7 January 2006 – 17 March 2007	Succeeded by Jean-Marc Mormeck
Preceded by Jean-Marc Mormeck	WBC cruiserweight champion 7 January 2006 – 17 March 2007	Succeeded by Jean-Marc Mormeck
Preceded by Jean-Marc Mormeck	The Ring cruiserweight champion 7 January 2006 – 17 March 2007	Succeeded by Jean-Marc Mormeck
Vacant Title last held by Evander Holyfield	Undisputed cruiserweight champion 7 January 2006 – March 2006; Titles fragmented	Vacant Title next held by Oleksandr Usyk
Cruiserweight status
Previous: Magne Havnå	Latest born world champion to die 25 November 2015 – present	Incumbent
