= Bert Cooper =

American boxer (1966–2019)

Personal information
- Nickname: Smokin'
- Born: Bertram Cooper; January 10, 1966 Sharon Hill, Pennsylvania, U.S.
- Died: May 10, 2019 (aged 53) Philadelphia, Pennsylvania, U.S.
- Height: 5 ft 11 in (1.80 m)
- Weight: Cruiserweight; Heavyweight

Boxing career
- Stance: Orthodox

Boxing record
- Total fights: 64
- Wins: 38
- Win by KO: 31
- Losses: 25
- No contests: 1

Bertram Cooper (January 10, 1966 – May 10, 2019), nicknamed Smokin' Bert Cooper, was an American professional boxer who competed between 1984 and 2012. He fought Evander Holyfield, George Foreman, Riddick Bowe, Michael Moorer, Chris Byrd, Ray Mercer, and Corrie Sanders, among others. Cooper challenged three times for a world title, and was known for being in several wild fights, including his world title bouts with Holyfield and Moorer.

== Professional career ==
Cooper came out of Philadelphia and was trained in his early years by ex-champ Joe Frazier, and rose in the rankings with a series of explosive knockouts in the Cruiserweight division. Unable to get a world title shot despite winning the NABF belt and defeating Olympic gold medallist Henry Tillman and future world champion Tyrone Booze, he began boxing in the heavyweight division, knocking out Willie DeWitt in 2 rounds but being stopped in 8 rounds by No. 1 ranked heavyweight contender Carl "The Truth" Williams and in 2 rounds by George Foreman.

In 1990, having failed to secure a cruiserweight world title fight, Cooper moved to heavyweight permanently, knocking out top 5-ranked Orlin Norris and claiming his NABF title. He lost the title in his first defense, outpointed over 12 by undefeated Olympic gold medallist Ray Mercer in an explosive brawl. Later the same year he was KO'd in 2 rounds by fast-rising Riddick Bowe and his career looked over. However, Cooper bounced back in 1991, stopping Joe Hipp in 5 rounds and then being matched on short notice with Evander Holyfield for the undisputed heavyweight championship after two opponents dropped out. Cooper came off the floor in the first round to stun Holyfield in the 3rd round (scoring the first knockdown of Holyfield in the process), the two exchanging big blows before the referee Mills Lane stopped the fight in the 7th.

The fight made Cooper a big name and he would be matched in many high-profile fights over the years. In June 1992 he boxed undefeated Michael Moorer for the vacant WBO title, knocking Moorer down twice but also going down twice himself before being stopped in the 5th. Cooper's career went downhill from this point, being outpointed by veteran Mike Weaver for the obscure National Boxing Association Heavyweight title in China and then losing to prospects like Corrie Sanders, Chris Byrd, Fres Oquendo, and Joe Mesi. On June 18, 2010, Cooper, aged 44, made a successful comeback after eight years out of the ring, a sixth-round knockout of Corey Winfield in Winston-Salem, North Carolina.

== Personal ==
His hometown was Sharon Hill, Pennsylvania, United States. He was 5 ft 11 in (180 cm) tall. He died on May 10, 2019, from pancreatic cancer at the age of 53.

== Professional boxing record ==
64 fights	38 wins	25 losses
By knockout	31	16
By decision	7	8
By disqualification	0	1
No contests	1	

No.	Result	Record	Opponent	Type	Round, time	Date	Location	Notes
64	Loss	38–25 (1)	Carl Davis	TKO	2 (6), 2:32	Sep 8, 2012	Civic Center, Hammond, Indiana, U.S.	
63	Loss	38–24 (1)	Chauncy Welliver	UD	10	Apr 5, 2012	Capitol Plaza Hotel, Jefferson City, Missouri, U.S.	For WBC Continental Americas heavyweight title
62	Loss	38–23 (1)	Luis Ortiz	TKO	2 (10), 1:29	Apr 23, 2011	Miami-Dade County Fair & Expo, Miami, Florida, U.S.	
61	Win	38–22 (1)	Gabe Brown	SD	6	Feb 26, 2011	Club Europe, Atlanta, Georgia, U.S.	
60	Win	37–22 (1)	Corey Winfield	KO	6 (6), 2:21	Jun 18, 2010	Benton Convention Center, Winston-Salem, North Carolina, U.S.	
59	Loss	36–22 (1)	Darroll Wilson	RTD	4 (10), 3:00	Sep 20, 2002	Blue Horizon, Philadelphia, Pennsylvania, U.S.	
58	Win	36–21 (1)	Craig Tomlinson	UD	10	Jun 22, 2002	Sovereign Center, Reading, Pennsylvania, U.S.	Won USA Pennsylvania State heavyweight title
57	Loss	35–21 (1)	Joe Mesi	TKO	7 (10), 0:41	Jul 27, 2001	Civic Center, Niagara Falls, New York, U.S.	
56	Loss	35–20 (1)	Fres Oquendo	UD	10	Oct 16, 1999	Star Plaza Theatre, Merrillville, Indiana, U.S.	
55	Win	35–19 (1)	Brian Yates	TKO	4 (10), 2:10	Jun 19, 1999	Genesis Center, Gary, Indiana, U.S.	
54	Loss	34–19 (1)	Derrick Jefferson	TKO	2 (10), 1:02	Mar 4, 1999	Soaring Eagle Casino, Mount Pleasant, Michigan, U.S.	
53	Loss	34–18 (1)	Anthony Green	UD	8	Sep 19, 1997	Allentown, Pennsylvania, U.S.	
52	Win	34–17 (1)	Richie Melito	KO	1 (12), 1:51	Jul 29, 1997	The Theater at Madison Square Garden, New York City, New York, U.S.	Won WBF heavyweight title
51	Loss	33–17 (1)	Samson Po'uha	TKO	4 (10), 1:36	Apr 22, 1997	The Palace, Auburn Hills, Michigan, U.S.	
50	Loss	33–16 (1)	Chris Byrd	UD	10	Mar 18, 1997	IMA Center, Flint, Michigan, U.S.	
49	Loss	33–15 (1)	Alexander Zolkin	TKO	9 (12), 2:50	Jun 23, 1995	Atlantic City, New Jersey, U.S.	For NABF heavyweight title
48	Win	33–14 (1)	George Harris	KO	1 (10)	Jul 30, 1994	Cincinnati, Ohio, U.S.	
47	Loss	32–14 (1)	Jeremy Williams	DQ	7 (10), 1:48	Jun 24, 1994	Olympic Auditorium, Los Angeles, California, U.S.	Cooper DQ'd for purposefully spitting mouthpiece
46	Win	32–13 (1)	Joe Savage	KO	1 (10), 1:41	Apr 22, 1994	Civic Arena, Nanaimo, British Columbia, Canada	
45	Loss	31–13 (1)	Larry Donald	TKO	7 (12), 1:16	Apr 14, 1994	Casino Magic, Bay St. Louis, Mississippi, U.S.	For WBC Continental Americas heavyweight title
44	Loss	31–12 (1)	Craig Petersen	SD	3	Dec 3, 1993	Casino Magic, Bay St. Louis, Mississippi, U.S.	People's Choice One-Night Heavyweight Tournament
43	Win	31–11 (1)	Mike Robinson	TKO	3 (10), 2:59	Nov 28, 1993	Camp Hill, Pennsylvania, U.S.	
42	Loss	30–11 (1)	Corrie Sanders	TKO	3 (10), 1:26	Jun 26, 1993	Resorts International, Atlantic City, New Jersey, U.S.	
41	Win	30–10 (1)	Derek Williams	UD	10	Mar 25, 1993	Harrah's Casino Hotel, Atlantic City, New Jersey, U.S.	
40	Loss	29–10 (1)	Mike Weaver	UD	10	Feb 27, 1993	Capital City Gymnasium, Beijing, China	For vacant NBA heavyweight title
39	Win	29–9 (1)	Rocky Pepeli	TKO	8 (10), 2:10	Sep 15, 1992	War Memorial Auditorium, Fort Lauderdale, Florida, U.S.	
38	Win	28–9 (1)	David Jaco	UD	10	Jul 11, 1992	Fort Myers, Florida, U.S.	
37	Loss	27–9 (1)	Michael Moorer	TKO	5 (12), 2:21	May 15, 1992	Trump Taj Mahal, Atlantic City, New Jersey, U.S.	For vacant WBO heavyweight title
36	Win	27–8 (1)	Cecil Coffee	TKO	2 (10), 1:24	Feb 15, 1992	Mirage Hotel & Casino, Paradise, Nevada, U.S.	
35	Loss	26–8 (1)	Evander Holyfield	TKO	7 (12), 2:58	Nov 23, 1991	The Omni, Atlanta, Georgia, U.S.	For WBA and IBF heavyweight title
34	Win	26–7 (1)	Joe Hipp	TKO	5 (10), 1:01	Oct 18, 1991	Convention Center, Atlantic City, New Jersey, U.S.	
33	Win	25–7 (1)	Anthony Wade	TKO	8 (19), 1:36	Aug 8, 1991	Atlantic City, New Jersey, U.S.	
32	Win	24–7 (1)	Conroy Nelson	TKO	9 (10), 2:23	May 11, 1991	Regina, Saskatchewan, Canada	
31	Win	23–7 (1)	Loren Ross	TKO	8 (10), 1:16	Feb 26, 1991	Birmingham, Alabama, U.S.	
30	Loss	22–7 (1)	Riddick Bowe	KO	2 (10), 3:09	Oct 25, 1990	Mirage Hotel & Casino, Paradise, Nevada, U.S.	
29	Loss	22–6 (1)	Ray Mercer	UD	12	Aug 5, 1990	Convention Hall, Atlantic City, New Jersey, U.S.	Lost NABF heavyweight title
28	Win	22–5 (1)	Orlin Norris	TKO	8 (13), 1:34	Feb 17, 1990	Northlands Coliseum, Edmonton, Alberta, Canada	Won NABF heavyweight title
27	NC	21–5 (1)	Mike Cohen	NC	8	Dec 9, 1989	Daytona Beach, Florida, U.S.	
26	Win	21–5	Rick Hoard	TKO	1 (6), 1:23	Sep 28, 1989	Finky's Bar, Daytona Beach, Florida, U.S.	
25	Loss	20–5	George Foreman	RTD	2 (10), 3:00	Jun 1, 1989	Pride Pavilion, Phoenix, Arizona, U.S.	
24	Loss	20–4	Nate Miller	RTD	6 (12), 3:00	Feb 15, 1989	Pennsylvania Hall, Philadelphia, Pennsylvania, U.S.	Lost NABF cruiserweight title
23	Win	20–3	Tony Morrison	TKO	9 (12), 2:59	Sep 27, 1988	Halifax Forum, Halifax, Nova Scotia, Canada	Retained NABF cruiserweight title
22	Loss	19–3	Everett Martin	UD	10	Jun 1, 1988	Resorts International, Atlantic City, New Jersey, U.S.	
21	Win	19–2	Tony Fulilangi	TKO	4 (12), 2:44	Mar 19, 1988	Caesars Palace, Paradise, Nevada, U.S.	Retained NABF cruiserweight title
20	Win	18–2	Tim Bullock	TKO	3 (10)	Dec 4, 1987	Sands Casino Hotel, Atlantic City, New Jersey, U.S.	
19	Win	17–2	Andre McCall	TKO	6 (12), 2:54	Nov 20, 1987	Resorts International, Atlantic City, New Jersey, U.S.	Retained NABF cruiserweight title
18	Loss	16–2	Carl Williams	RTD	7 (12), 3:00	Jun 21, 1987	Resorts International, Atlantic City, New Jersey, U.S.	For vacant USBA heavyweight title
17	Win	16–1	Willie de Wit	TKO	2 (10), 2:58	Feb 14, 1987	Regina Agridome, Regina, Saskatchewan, Canada	
16	Win	15–1	Carlos Hernández	TKO	8 (10), 1:04	Dec 2, 1986	Resorts International, Atlantic City, New Jersey, U.S.	
15	Win	14–1	Spencer Chavis	TKO	3 (12), 1:03	Oct 10, 1986	Showboat Hotel & Casino, Las Vegas, Nevada, U.S.	Retained NABF cruiserweight title
14	Win	13–1	Tyrone Booze	SD	12	Aug 26, 1986	Stateline, Nevada, U.S.	Retained NABF cruiserweight title
13	Win	12–1	Henry Tillman	UD	12	Jun 15, 1986	Atlantic City, New Jersey, U.S.	Won NABF cruiserweight title
12	Win	11–1	Oscar Holman	TKO	10 (10), 0:31	Apr 18, 1986	Trump Casino Hotel, Atlantic City, New Jersey, U.S.	
11	Loss	10–1	Reggie Gross	TKO	8 (10), 1:24	Jan 31, 1986	Trump Casino Hotel, Atlantic City, New Jersey, U.S.	
10	Win	10–0	Cedric Parsons	KO	1 (10), 0:46	Dec 12, 1985	Resorts International, Atlantic City, New Jersey, U.S.	
9	Win	9–0	Ray Davison	UD	6	Oct 9, 1985	Trump Casino Hotel, Atlantic City, New Jersey, U.S.	
8	Win	8–0	Tim Davenport	TKO	1 (6), 1:59	Aug 3, 1985	Scranton, Pennsylvania, U.S.	
7	Win	7–0	Larry Givens	TKO	3 (6), 2:22	May 20, 1985	Lawlor Events Center, Reno, Nevada, U.S.	
6	Win	6–0	Jim Jones	KO	1 (6), 0:59	May 9, 1985	Caesars Boardwalk Regency, Atlantic City, New Jersey, U.S.	
5	Win	5–0	Lorenzo Boyd	KO	1 (6)	Apr 18, 1985	Monroe, Louisiana, U.S.	
4	Win	4–0	Alvin Fuggs	KO	1 (6), 1:14	Feb 23, 1985	Sands Casino Hotel, Atlantic City, New Jersey, U.S.	
3	Win	3–0	Ian Priest	TKO	1 (6), 1:00	Nov 24, 1984	Leisure Centre, Gateshead, England	
2	Win	2–0	Mark Young	TKO	2 (4), 2:18	Oct 30, 1984	Tropicana Hotel & Casino, Atlantic City, New Jersey, U.S.	
1	Win	1–0	Dennis Caldwell	KO	1 (4), 1:28	Sep 11, 1984	Atlantic City, New Jersey, U.S.	

Awards and achievements
Preceded by Henry Tillman	NABF Cruiserweight Champion; 15 June 1986 – 15 February 1989	Succeeded by Nate Miller
Preceded by Orlin Norris	NABF Heavyweight Champion; 17 February 1990 – 5 August 1990	Succeeded by Ray Mercer
Preceded by Lionel Butler; Stripped	WBF Heavyweight Champion; July 29, 1997 – January 29, 1998; Stripped	Succeeded by Joe Bugner
Preceded by Roy Williams	USA Pennsylvania State Heavyweight Champion; June 22, 2002 – September 9, 2005; Vacated	Vacant Title next held by Eddie Chambers
