= Nate Miller (boxer) =

American boxer (born 1963)

Personal information
- Nickname: Mister Miller
- Nationality: American
- Born: August 3, 1963 (age 63) Philadelphia, Pennsylvania, U.S.
- Height: 6 ft 2 in (188 cm)
- Weight: Cruiserweight; Super cruiserweight

Boxing career
- Reach: 77 in (196 cm)
- Stance: Orthodox

Boxing record
- Total fights: 40
- Wins: 31
- Win by KO: 27
- Losses: 9

Nate Miller (born August 3, 1963) is an American former professional boxer who competed from 1986 to 2001.

== Professional career ==
He turned pro in 1986 and in 1994 landed a shot at IBF Cruiserweight Title holder Alfred Cole, but lost a decision. In 1995 he scored a KO victory over Orlin Norris to win the WBA Cruiserweight Title, his first defense was against Argentine boxer Reynaldo Gimenez. Miller defended the title four times in total before losing the belt to Fabrice Tiozzo in 1997. He retired in 2001 after losses to Norris, Thomas Hearns, and Vincenzo Rossitto.

== Professional boxing record ==
40 fights	31 wins	9 losses
By knockout	27	0
By decision	4	9

No.	Result	Record	Opponent	Type	Round, time	Date	Location	Notes
40	Loss	31–9	Vincenzo Rossitto	PTS	10	23 Jun 2001	Syracuse, Sicily, Italy	
39	Loss	31–8	Tue Bjørn Thomsen	TD	10	31 Mar 2000	Esbjerg Stadionhal, Esbjerg, Denmark	For IBC World Super Cruiserweight title
38	Win	31–7	Exum Speight	TKO	1 (8)	2 Jul 1999	Fairmount Park, Philadelphia, Pennsylvania, U.S.	
37	Loss	30–7	Thomas Hearns	UD	12	10 Apr 1999	MEN Arena, Manchester, England, U.K.	For vacant IBO cruiserweight title
36	Loss	30–6	Orlin Norris	UD	12	6 Aug 1998	Grand Casino Avoyelles, Marksville, Louisiana, U.S.	For IBA Super Cruiserweight title
35	Loss	30–5	Fabrice Tiozzo	UD	12	8 Nov 1997	Thomas & Mack Center, Paradise, Nevada, U.S.	Lost WBA cruiserweight title
34	Win	30–4	Alexander Gurov	TKO	2 (12), 1:54	22 Feb 1997	The Theatre, Fort Lauderdale, Florida, U.S.	Retained WBA cruiserweight title
33	Win	29–4	James Heath	TKO	7 (12), 2:54	31 Aug 1996	Point Theatre, Dublin, Ireland	Retained WBA cruiserweight title
32	Win	28–4	Brian LaSpada	TKO	9 (12), 0:56	23 Mar 1996	Miami Arena, Miami, Florida, U.S.	Retained WBA cruiserweight title
31	Win	27–4	Reinaldo Gimenez	TKO	5 (12), 3:00	13 Jan 1996	Jai Alai Fronton, Miami, Florida, U.S.	Retained WBA cruiserweight title
30	Win	26–4	Orlin Norris	KO	8 (12)	22 Jul 1995	London Arena, Millwall, England, U.K.	Won WBA cruiserweight title
29	Win	25–4	Ron Preston	TKO	6 (8)	19 Jun 1995	The Blue Horizon, Philadelphia, Pennsylvania, U.S.	
28	Win	24–4	Carlton West	TKO	2 (10), 2:14	10 Feb 1995	The Blue Horizon, Philadelphia, Pennsylvania, U.S.	
27	Loss	23–4	Al Cole	UD	12	23 Jul 1994	Civic Center, Bismarck, North Dakota, U.S.	For IBF cruiserweight title
26	Win	23–3	Grady Smith	TKO	5 (?)	7 Aug 1993	Resorts International, Atlantic City, New Jersey, U.S.	
25	Win	22–3	Ken Jackson	KO	3 (8)	11 May 1993	The Blue Horizon, Philadelphia, Pennsylvania, U.S.	
24	Win	21–3	Dwight Muhammad Qawi	UD	10	13 Oct 1992	The Blue Horizon, Philadelphia, Pennsylvania, U.S.	
23	Win	20–3	Jade Scott	TKO	7 (10), 1:29	24 Jul 1992	Friar Tuck Inn, Catskill, New York, U.S.	
22	Win	19–3	Wali Muhammad	TKO	7 (10), 0:51	17 Dec 1991	The Blue Horizon, Philadelphia, Pennsylvania, U.S.	
21	Loss	18–3	Al Cole	UD	12	9 May 1991	Essex County College, Newark, New Jersey, U.S.	For USBA Cruiserweight Title
20	Loss	18–2	James Warring	UD	12	17 Dec 1990	Harrah's Marina Hotel Casino, Atlantic City, New Jersey, U.S.	Lost NABF cruiserweight title
19	Win	18–1	Michael Greer	TKO	5 (12), 1:40	2 Oct 1990	The Blue Horizon, Philadelphia, Pennsylvania, U.S.	Retained NABF cruiserweight title
18	Win	17–1	Ed Smith	TKO	9 (10)	25 Jun 1990	Harrah's Marina Hotel Casino, Atlantic City, New Jersey, U.S.	
17	Win	16–1	Tyrone Booze	UD	12	26 Mar 1990	Harrah's Marina Hotel Casino, Atlantic City, New Jersey, U.S.	Retained NABF cruiserweight title
16	Win	15–1	Andre McCall	TKO	7 (12), 1:37	10 Jul 1989	The Blue Horizon, Philadelphia, Pennsylvania, U.S.	Retained NABF cruiserweight title
15	Win	14–1	Bert Cooper	RTD	6 (12), 3:00	15 Feb 1989	Pennsylvania Hall, Philadelphia, Pennsylvania, U.S.	Won NABF cruiserweight title
14	Loss	13–1	Boubakar Sanogo	PTS	8	21 Oct 1988	L'Espace d'Ornon, Villenave d'Ornon, France	
13	Win	13–0	Mike Fisher	RTD	5 (8), 3:00	16 Aug 1988	National Guard Armory, Philadelphia, Pennsylvania, U.S.	
12	Win	12–0	Lionel Byarm	TKO	2 (8)	14 Jul 1988	The Blue Horizon, Philadelphia, Pennsylvania, U.S.	
11	Win	11–0	Tim Bullock	TD	5 (8)	19 May 1988	The Blue Horizon, Philadelphia, Pennsylvania, U.S.	
10	Win	10–0	Ricardo Spain	TKO	2 (8), 1:38	15 Mar 1988	The Blue Horizon, Philadelphia, Pennsylvania, U.S.	
9	Win	9–0	Woody Clark	TKO	5 (8), 3:00	8 Dec 1987	The Blue Horizon, Philadelphia, Pennsylvania, U.S.	
8	Win	8–0	Stanley Ross	TKO	5 (8), 0:51	11 Nov 1987	The Blue Horizon, Philadelphia, Pennsylvania, U.S.	
7	Win	7–0	Dawud Shaw	RTD	1 (6), 3:00	15 Sep 1987	The Blue Horizon, Philadelphia, Pennsylvania, U.S.	
6	Win	6–0	Harry Savage	RTD	1 (4), 3:00	18 Aug 1987	The Blue Horizon, Philadelphia, Pennsylvania, U.S.	
5	Win	5–0	George Wilson	TKO	1 (4)	1 Jun 1987	Pennsylvania Hall, Philadelphia, Pennsylvania, U.S.	
4	Win	4–0	Ricardo Spain	UD	6	31 Mar 1987	The Blue Horizon, Philadelphia, Pennsylvania, U.S.	
3	Win	3–0	John Williams	TKO	2 (4), 0:35	10 Feb 1987	The Blue Horizon, Philadelphia, Pennsylvania, U.S.	
2	Win	2–0	Harry Savage	KO	1 (4), 1:21	27 Jan 1987	Electric Playground, Philadelphia, Pennsylvania, U.S.	
1	Win	1–0	Tony Jackson	TKO	1 (4), 1:30	30 Sep 1986	The Blue Horizon, Philadelphia, Pennsylvania, U.S.	

== See also ==
- List of world cruiserweight boxing champions

Sporting positions
Regional boxing titles
Preceded by Bert Cooper	NABF cruiserweight champion February 15, 1989 – December 17, 1990	Succeeded by James Warring
World boxing titles
Preceded by Orlin Norris	WBA cruiserweight champion July 22, 1995 – November 8, 1997	Succeeded by Fabrice Tiozzo
