= List of world cruiserweight boxing champions =

This is a chronological list of world cruiserweight boxing champions, as recognized by four of the better-known sanctioning organizations:

== Championship recognition ==
- The World Boxing Association (WBA), founded in 1921 as the National Boxing Association (NBA),
- The World Boxing Council (WBC), founded in 1963,
- The International Boxing Federation (IBF), founded in 1983,
- The World Boxing Organization (WBO), founded in 1988,

No.	Reign began	Reign ended	Champion	Recognition
1	31 March 1980	25 November 1980	(United States) Marvin Camel	Universal
	Camel and Mate Parlov fought to a draw in the first Cruiserweight championship bout on 12 August 1979, sanctioned by the World Boxing Council. Camel won the rematch to become champion. Since the WBC was the only sanctioning body to recognize a Cruiserweight division at the time, he is considered by some an undisputed champion.			
2	25 November 1980	13 February 1982	(Puerto Rico) Carlos De León	Universal
3	13 February 1982	27 June 1982	(Puerto Rico) Carlos De Leon	WBC
4	13 February 1982	1 December 1984	(Puerto Rico) Ossie Ocasio	WBA
	Ocasio defeated Robbie Williams in the first Cruiserweight championship bout sanctioned by the World Boxing Association.			
5	27 June 1982	17 July 1983	(United States) S. T. Gordon	WBC
6	17 July 1983	6 June 1985	(Puerto Rico) Carlos De León	WBC
7	13 February 1983	6 October 1984	(United States) Marvin Camel	IBF
	Just as he had done with the WBC title, Camel became the first champion in the division crowned by the International Boxing Federation, defeating Roddy McDonald to win the vacant title.			
8	6 October 1984	25 October 1986	(United States) Lee Roy Murphy	IBF
9	1 December 1984	27 July 1985	(South Africa) Piet Crous	WBA
10	6 June 1985	21 September 1985	(United States) Alfonso Ratliff	WBC
11	27 July 1985	12 July 1986	(United States) Dwight Muhammad Qawi (Dwight Braxton)	WBA
12	21 September 1985	22 March 1986	(United States) Bernard Benton	WBC
13	22 March 1986	9 April 1988	(Puerto Rico) Carlos De León	WBC
14	12 July 1986	15 May 1987	(United States) Evander Holyfield	WBA
15	25 October 1986	15 May 1987	(United States) Rickey Parkey	IBF
16	15 May 1987	9 April 1988	(United States) Evander Holyfield	WBA & IBF
17	9 April 1988	4 December 1988^{2}	(United States) Evander Holyfield	Universal
	Holyfield unified his titles with Carlos De Leon's WBC title, making him the division's first truly undisputed champion.			
18	25 March 1989	25 September 1989^{2}	(Tunisia) Taoufik Belbouli	WBA
	Belbouli defeated Michael Greer to win the vacant title.			
19	17 May 1989	27 July 1990	(Puerto Rico) Carlos De León	WBC
	De Leon defeated Sammy Reeson to win the vacant title.			
20	3 June 1989	22 March 1990	(United Kingdom) Glenn McCrory	IBF
	McCrory defeated Patrick Lumumba to win the vacant title.			
21	27 November 1989	8 March 1991	(United States) Robert Daniels	WBA
	Daniels defeated Dwight Muhammad Qawi to win the vacant title.			
22	3 December 1989	17 May 1990	(United States) Boone Pultz	WBO
	Pultz defeated Magne Havnå to win the inaugural WBO cruiserweight title.			
23	22 March 1990	27 July 1991^{1}	(United States) Jeff Lampkin	IBF
24	17 May 1990	1 May 1992	(Norway) Magne Havnå^{2}	WBO
25	27 July 1990	20 July 1991	(Italy) Massimiliano Duran	WBC
26	8 March 1991	5 August 1993^{2}	(United States) Bobby Czyz	WBA
27	20 July 1991	7 July 1995^{2}	(France) Anaclet Wamba	WBC
28	7 September 1991	30 July 1992	(United States) James Warring	IBF
	Warring defeated James Pritchard to win the vacant title.			
29	25 July 1992	13 February 1993	(United States) Tyrone Booze	WBO
	Booze defeated Derek Angol to win the vacant title.			
30	30 July 1992	30 April 1996^{2}	(United States) Alfred Cole	IBF
31	13 February 1993	26 June 1993	(Germany) Markus Bott	WBO
32	26 June 1993	17 December 1994	(Argentina) Nestor Hipolito Giovannini	WBO
33	6 November 1993	22 July 1995	(United States) Orlin Norris	WBA
	Norris defeated Marcelo Victor Figueroa to win the vacant title.			
34	17 December 1994	1 January 1995^{2}	(Germany) Dariusz Michalczewski	WBO
35	10 June 1995	4 October 1997	(Germany) Ralf Rocchigiani	WBO
	Rocchigiani defeated Carl Thompson to win the vacant title.			
36	22 July 1995	8 November 1997	(United States) Nate Miller	WBA
37	25 July 1995	21 February 1998	(Argentina) Marcelo Dominguez	WBC
	Dominguez defeated Akim Tafer to win the vacant title.			
38	31 August 1996	21 June 1997	(United States) Adolpho Washington	IBF
	Washington defeated Torsten May to win the vacant title.			
39	21 June 1997	8 November 1997	(Jamaica) Uriah Grant	IBF
40	4 October 1997	27 March 1999	(United Kingdom) Carl Thompson	WBO
41	8 November 1997	30 October 1998	(United States) Imamu Mayfield	IBF
42	8 November 1997	9 December 2000	(France) Fabrice Tiozzo	WBA
43	21 February 1998	19 February 2002^{2}	(Cuba) Juan Carlos Gómez	WBC
44	30 October 1998	5 June 1999	(United States) Arthur Williams	IBF
45	27 March 1999	22 September 2006^{2}	(United Kingdom) Johnny Nelson	WBO
46	5 June 1999	26 April 2003	(Kazakhstan) Vassiliy Jirov	IBF
47	9 December 2000	23 February 2002	(United States) Virgil Hill	WBA
48	23 February 2002	2 April 2005	(France) Jean-Marc Mormeck	WBA
49	11 October 2002	2 April 2005	(Guyana) Wayne Braithwaite	WBC
	Braithwaite defeated Vincenzo Cantatore to win the vacant title.			
50	2 April 2005	7 January 2006	(France) Jean-Marc Mormeck	WBA & WBC
	Upon unifying the WBA and WBC titles against Wayne Braithwaite, the WBA upgraded Mormeck to the title of "super champion" and the "regular" title was declared vacant.			
51	26 April 2003	9 December 2003^{2}	(United States) James Toney	IBF
52	1 May 2004	20 May 2005^{2}	(United States) Kelvin Davis	IBF
	Davis defeated Ezra Sellers to win the vacant title.			
53	20 May 2005	7 January 2006	(Jamaica) O'Neil Bell	IBF
	Bell defeated Dale Brown to win the vacant title.			
54	7 January 2006	31 March 2006^{1}	(Jamaica) O'Neil Bell	WBA (super Champion), WBC, & IBF
	O'Neil Bell defeated Jean-Marc Mormeck on 7 January 2006, by knockout in round 10, unifying his IBF belt with Mormeck's WBA and WBC belts. That distinction lasted just under three months, as the IBF withdrew its recognition of Bell when Bell failed to reach an agreement to fight the organization's mandatory challenger.			
55	27 January 2006	24 November 2007	(United States) Virgil Hill	WBA (regular champion)
	Hill defeated Valery Brudov to win the vacant WBA "regular" title.			
56	31 March 2006	17 March 2007	(Jamaica) O'Neil Bell	WBA (super champion) & WBC
57	22 September 2006	8 March 2008	(United Kingdom) Enzo Maccarinelli	WBO
	Maccarinelli won the interim title by defeating Marcelo Dominguez on 8 July 2006. Upon champion Johnny Nelson's retirement, Maccarinelli was upgraded to full champion status.			
58	26 November 2006	26 May 2007	(Poland) Krzysztof Włodarczyk	IBF
	Wlodarczyk defeated Steve Cunningham to win the vacant title.			
59	17 March 2007	10 November 2007	(France) Jean-Marc Mormeck	WBA (super champion), WBC
60	26 May 2007	11 December 2008	(United States) Steve Cunningham	IBF
61	10 November 2007	8 March 2008	(United Kingdom) David Haye	WBA (super champion), WBC
62	24 November 2007	28 September 2008	(Germany) Firat Arslan	WBA (regular champion)
63	8 March 2008	12 May 2008^{2}	(United Kingdom) David Haye	WBA (super champion), WBC, WBO
	David Haye defeated Enzo Maccarinelli on 8 March 2008 and unified his WBA and WBC titles with Maccarinelli's WBO title. On 12 May, he relinquished his WBC belt and would eventually relinquish the WBA and WBO belts in order to move up in weight.			
64	28 September 2008	30 October 2012 ^{1}	(Panama) Guillermo Jones	WBA
	On 30 October 2012, Guillermo Jones was stripped of the WBA title and named "Champion in Recess" due to his failure to meet mandatory challenger and interim champion Denis Lebedev in a timely manner thus elevating Lebedev to full champion status. The two would eventually meet on 17 May 2013 with Jones knocking Lebedev out in the 11th round of a brutal fight. However, in the post-fight drug screen Jones tested positive for a banned substance and although the fight still stands as a win for Jones, Lebedev was subsequently reinstated as champion. The WBA ordered a rematch that was scheduled to take place on 25 April 2014 however, Jones once again tested positive for a banned substance in the pre-fight drug screen and the rematch was canceled.			
65	28 October 2008	22 November 2009	(Italy) Giacobbe Fragomeni	WBC
	Fragomeni defeated Rudolf Kraj to win the vacant title.			
66	11 December 2008	18 October 2009^{2}	(Poland) Tomasz Adamek	IBF
67	17 January 2009	29 August 2009	(Argentina) Victor Emilio Ramírez	WBO
	Ramirez defeated Aleksandr Alekseyev to win the interim title. Once champion David Haye made it clear he would no longer compete in the cruiserweight division, Ramirez was upgraded to full champion status.			
68	29 August 2009	14 August 2015	(Germany) Marco Huck	WBO
69	22 November 2009	22 January 2010^{2}	(Hungary) Zsolt Erdei	WBC
70	15 May 2010	27 September 2014	(Poland) Krzysztof Włodarczyk	WBC
	Wlodarczyk defeated Giacobbe Fragomeni to win the vacant title.			
71	5 June 2010	1 October 2011	(United States) Steve Cunningham	IBF
	Cunningham defeated Troy Ross to win the vacant title.			
72	1 October 2011	21 September 2015^{1}	(Cuba) Yoan Pablo Hernández	IBF
73	30 October 2012	1 February 2018	(Russia) Denis Lebedev	WBA
74	29 May 2016	Vacated	(United Kingdom) Tony Bellew	WBC
75	27 September 2014	17 September 2016	(Poland) Krzysztof Głowacki	WBO
76	21 September 2015	21 May 2016	(Argentina) Victor Emilio Ramirez	IBF
77	21 May 2016	3 December 2016	(Russia) Denis Lebedev	WBA, IBF
78	17 September 2016	5 June 2019	(Ukraine) Oleksandr Usyk	WBO
79	3 December 2016	21 July 2018	(Russia) Murat Gassiev	IBF
80	1 April 2017	27 January 2018	(Latvia) Mairis Briedis	WBC
81	27 January 2018	27 March 2019	(Ukraine) Oleksandr Usyk	WBO, WBC
82	3 February 2018	21 July 2018	(Russia) Murat Gassiev	WBA, IBF
83	21 July 2018	27 March 2019	(Ukraine) Oleksandr Usyk	WBO, WBC, WBA, IBF, The Ring
84	31 May 2019	30 March 2024	(France) Arsen Goulamirian	WBA
85	31 January 2020	26 February 2023	(Democratic Republic of the Congo) Ilunga Makabu	WBC
86	26 September 2020	2 July 2022	(Latvia) Mairis Briedis	IBF, The Ring
87	20 March 2021	27 May 2023	(United Kingdom) Lawrence Okolie	WBO
88	2 July 2022	23 Mar 2026	(Australia) Jai Opetaia	IBF, The Ring
	IBF title vacated by Opetaia on 17 December 2023, after dispute with IBF. On 18 May 2024, Opetaia won IBF title again, defeating Mairis Briedis.			
89	26 February 2023	17 September 2023	(Sweden) Badou Jack	WBC
90	27 May 2023	16 November 2024	(United Kingdom) Chris Billam-Smith	WBO
91	4 November 2023	11 December 2024	(Germany) Noel Mikaelian	WBC
	Mikaelian defeated Ilunga Makabu to win the vacant title.			
92	30 March 2024	2 May 2026	(Mexico) Gilberto Ramirez	WBA
93	16 November 2024	2 May 2026	(Mexico) Gilberto Ramirez	WBO
94	11 December 2024	13 December 2025	(Sweden) Badou Jack	WBC
	Jack reinstated by WBC.			
95	13 December 2025	Present	(Germany) Noel Mikaelian	WBC
96	2 May 2026	Present	(United States) David Benavidez	WBA, WBO

== Footnotes ==
^{1} Championship recognition withdrawn due to champion's failure/refusal to defend title against mandatory or designated challenger.
^{2} Relinquished title.

== Cruiserweight champions who won belts in other divisions ==
- Braxton, Jack, Michalczewski, Hill, Erdei, Adamek, Shumenov, Tiozzo, and Benavidez all were light-heavyweight champions.
- Holyfield, Haye, and Usyk are the only former cruiserweight champions to win the heavyweight title with Holyfield and Usyk earning recognition as undisputed champions in both divisions.
- Toney won titles at middleweight and super middleweight. He also defeated John Ruiz in an attempt to win the heavyweight title but failed a post-fight drug test and the result was changed to a No Decision.
- Jack and Benavidez won titles at super middleweight.

== See also ==
- List of Australian cruiserweight boxing champions
- List of British cruiserweight boxing champions
- List of New Zealand cruiserweight boxing champions
- List of British world boxing champions
