= James Warring =

American martial artist

- Born: November 26, 1958 (age 67); Miami, Florida, U.S.
- Nationality: American
- Height: 1.90 m (6 ft 3 in)
- Weight: 100 kg (220 lb; 15 st 10 lb)
- Division: Cruiserweight
- Style: Boxing, Kickboxing
- Fighting out of: United States
- Years active: ?

Professional boxing record
- Total: 23
- Wins: 18
- By knockout: 11
- Losses: 4
- By knockout: 1
- Draws: 1

Mixed martial arts record
- Total: 3
- Wins: 2
- By knockout: 2
- Losses: 1
- By submission: 1

Other information
- Boxing record from BoxRec
- Mixed martial arts record from Sherdog
- Last updated on: June 25, 2011

James Warring (born November 26, 1958) is an American boxer, kickboxer and mixed martial artist. In professional boxing, he held the IBF world cruiserweight title from 1991 until 1992. In kickboxing, Warring is a four-time world champion, which included WKA world titles in 1983 and 1989. Warring along with Troy Dorsey are the only two fighters to hold World titles in both Boxing and Kickboxing simultaneously although Warring held Kickboxing titles on the international rules level.

== Biography ==
=== Career ===
- Kickboxing
  - US kickboxing champion
  - KICK World Cruiserweight Champion
  - PKC World Cruiserweight Champion
  - FFKA World Super Heavyweight Champion
  - WKA World Cruiserweight Champion
  - WKA World Heavyweight champion
- Boxing
  - NABF Cruiserweight Champion (December 12, 1990 - ?)
  - IBF World Cruiserweight Champion (September 7, 1991 – July 30, 1992)
- Mixed Martial Arts
  - World Combat Championship Runner-Up (1995)

=== Career after fighting ===
As of 2002, Warring was a referee for the Florida State Athletic Commission in Shin Do Kumate and boxing.

== Professional boxing record ==
23 fights	18 wins	4 losses
By knockout	11	1
By decision	7	3
Draws	1	

No.	Result	Record	Opponent	Type	Round, time	Date	Location	Notes
23	Loss	18–4–1	(Jamaica) Alex Stewart	UD	10	1 May 1997	(United States) Convention Center, Asbury Park, New Jersey	
22	Win	18–3–1	(United States) Derrick Roddy	UD	10	8 Nov 1996	(United States) Arizona Charlie's, Las Vegas, Nevada	
21	Win	17–3–1	(United States) Danny Wofford	PTS	8	6 Dec 1994	(United States) Columbia, South Carolina	
20	Win	16–3–1	(United States) Kertis Mingo	TKO	8 (?)	28 Sep 1994	(United States) Lancaster, South Carolina	
19	Win	15–3–1	(United States) Jim Williams	KO	2 (?)	21 Sep 1994	(United States) Raleigh, North Carolina	
18	Loss	14–3–1	(France) Norbert Ekassi	UD	10	2 Nov 1993	(France) Levallois-Perret, Hauts-de-Seine	
17	Draw	14–2–1	(United States) Alex Garcia	UD	12	27 Jul 1993	(United States) Riviera Hotel & Casino, Las Vegas, Nevada	For NABF heavyweight title
16	Loss	14–2	(United States) Al Cole	UD	12	30 Jul 1992	(United States) Waterloo Village, Stanhope, New Jersey	Lost IBF cruiserweight title
15	Win	14–1	(United Kingdom) Johnny Nelson	UD	12	16 May 1992	(United States) Hugo's Nightclub, Bealeton, Virginia	Retained IBF cruiserweight title
14	Win	13–1	(United States) Donnell Wingfield	KO	5 (12), 1:05	15 Nov 1991	(United States) Valley Sports Arena, Roanoke, Virginia	Retained IBF cruiserweight title
13	Win	12–1	(United States) James Pritchard	KO	1 (12), 0:36	7 Sep 1991	(Italy) Studio Comunate San Giacomo, Sicilia	Won vacant IBF cruiserweight title
12	Win	11–1	(United States) Nate Miller	UD	12	17 Dec 1990	(United States) Harrah's Marina Hotel Casino, Atlantic City, New Jersey	Won NABF cruiserweight title
11	Win	10–1	(United States) Craig Bodzianowski	UD	10	10 Nov 1989	(United States) International Amphitheatre, Chicago, Illinois	
10	Win	9–1	(United States) Danny Wofford	UD	6	8 Sep 1989	(United States) The Sheraton, Hialeah, Florida	
9	Win	8–1	(United States) Jack Simmons	KO	2 (?)	20 Mar 1989	(United States) Fort Lauderdale, Florida	
8	Win	7–1	(United States) Leon Dixon	TKO	2 (8)	24 Oct 1986	(United States) Holiday Inn West, Fort Lauderdale, Florida	
7	Win	6–1	(United States) Roger Troupe	KO	3 (8)	12 Sep 1986	(United States) Holiday Inn West, Fort Lauderdale, Florida	
6	Win	5–1	(United States) Robert Andrews	TKO	2 (6)	27 Jun 1986	(United States) Milander Auditorium, Hialeah, Florida	
5	Win	4–1	(United States) Robert Andrews	TKO	1 (?), 1:10	23 May 1986	(United States) Milander Auditorium, Hialeah, Florida	
4	Win	3–1	(United States) Miguel Mohedano	KO	1 (?)	25 Apr 1986	(United States) Milander Auditorium, Hialeah, Florida	
3	Win	2–1	(United States) Greg Payne	UD	6	27 Sep 1985	(United States) Sheraton Americas Hotel, Hialeah, Florida	
2	Loss	1–1	(The Bahamas) Pat Strachan			9 Aug 1985	(The Bahamas) Nassau, Bahamas	
1	Win	1–0	(United States) Jesse Torres	KO	1 (?)	25 Jan 1985	(United States) Milander Auditorium, Hialeah, Florida	Professional debut

== Mixed martial arts record ==
Professional record breakdown
3 matches	2 wins	1 loss
By knockout	2	0
By submission	0	1

Res.	Record	Opponent	Method	Event	Date	Round	Time	Location	Notes
Loss	2–1	Renzo Gracie	Submission (Ezekiel Choke)	WCC 1	October 17, 1995	1	2:47	Charlotte, North Carolina, USA	Final
Win	2–0	Erik Paulson	TKO (corner stoppage)	WCC 1	October 17, 1995	1	16:08	Charlotte, North Carolina, USA	Semi Finals
Win	1–0	Jerome Turcan	TKO (punches)	WCC 1	October 17, 1995	1	2:35	Charlotte, North Carolina, USA	Quarter Finals

== Kickboxing record ==
Professional kickboxing record
Date	Result	Opponent	Event	Location	Method	Round	Time
1997-10-17	Loss	(Netherlands) Peter Aerts	K-1 Grand Prix '97 1st round	Osaka, Japan	KO (Right high kick)	3	1:13
1987-04-25	Win	(United States) Jerry Rhome	PKC Karatemania II	Atlanta, USA	DQ	3	2:00
Wins Rhome's PKC World Heavyweight Championship. Rhome was disqualified for failure to meet minimum kick requirements.
-	Win	(United States) Maurice Smith	WKA Full Contact Karate	USA			
1984-01-20	Win	(United States) Don Nakaya Nielsen	WKA Full Contact Karate	Ciudad Juárez, Mexico	KO (Front kick)	3	
Wins the vacant WKA World Cruiserweight Championship.
1982-09-04	Loss	(United States) Don Wilson	WKA Kickboxing	Tokyo, Japan	Decision	11	2:00
Fight was for Wilson's WKA World Light Heavyweight Championship.
Legend: Win Loss Draw/No contest Notes

Amateur kickboxing record
Date	Result	Opponent	Event	Location	Method	Round	Time
?	Win	(Soviet Union) Vitali Klitschko	WAKO	United States	Decision (Split)	12	
Legend: Win Loss Draw/No contest Notes

Preceded by Jeff Lampkin; Stripped	IBF Cruiserweight Champion; 7 July 1991 – 30 July 1992	Succeeded by Al Cole
