= Arthur Williams (boxer) =

American boxer, born 1964

Personal information
- Nickname: King
- Born: Arthur James Williams; November 12, 1964 (age 61) Pensacola, Florida, U.S.
- Height: 6 ft 2 in (188 cm)
- Weight: Cruiserweight

Boxing career
- Reach: 80 in (203 cm)
- Stance: Orthodox

Boxing record
- Total fights: 65
- Wins: 47
- Win by KO: 30
- Losses: 17
- Draws: 1

Arthur James Williams (November 12, 1964 – April, 2023) was an American former professional boxer who competed between 1989 and 2010. He held the IBF cruiserweight title from 1998 to 1999 and challenged twice for the WBA cruiserweight title in 1994.

== Professional career ==
Williams became professional in 1989 and fell short in his first shot at a major championship title, a 1994 split-decision loss to Orlin Norris for the World Boxing Association Cruiserweight Title. Williams was knocked out in the third round in a rematch with Norris later that year.

=== IBF cruiserweight champion ===
It was not until 1998 that Williams got another shot at a title belt, a 1998 bout with Imamu Mayfield for the International Boxing Federation Cruiserweight Title.

He won the title by ninth round TKO, however in his first defence he lost to unbeaten Vassiliy Jirov.

== Post career ==
On June 23, 2024 Williams was inducted into the Florida Boxing Hall of Fame.

== Professional boxing record ==
65 fights	47 wins	17 losses
By knockout	30	9
By decision	17	8
Draws	1	

No.	Result	Record	Opponent	Type	Round, time	Date	Location	Notes
65	Loss	47–17–1	(United States) Carl Davis	UD	10	17/12/2010	(United States) UIC Pavilion, Chicago	USBO Cruiserweight Title.
64	Win	47–16–1	(United States) Valente Tinajero	UD	6	10/04/2010	(United States) Thomas & Mack Center, Las Vegas	
63	Loss	46–16–1	(United States) Victor Barragan	TKO	7	23/10/2009	(United States) Orleans Hotel & Casino, Las Vegas	WBC USNBC Cruiserweight Title.
62	Win	46–15–1	(United States) Dewey Cooper	MD	10	06/02/2009	(United States) Tachi Palace Hotel & Casino, Lemoore	WBC USNBC Cruiserweight Title.
61	Win	45–15–1	(United States) Dewey Cooper	TD	5	23/10/2008	(United States) Tachi Palace Hotel & Casino, Lemoore	WBC USNBC Cruiserweight Title.
60	Win	44–15–1	(United States) Clarence Moore	UD	6	21/05/2008	(United States) The Field House, Camp Lejuene	
59	Loss	43–15–1	(Germany) Alexander Frenkel	TKO	5	16/02/2008	(Germany) Nürnberger Arena, Nürnberger	Referee stopped the bout at 2:02 of the fifth round.
58	Win	43–14–1	(United States) Kenny Keene	TKO	10	29/07/2006	(United States) Qwest Arena, Boise	Referee stopped the bout at 0:43 of the tenth round.
57	Win	42–14–1	(United States) Gary Gomez	SD	10	20/01/2006	(United States) Coeur d'Alene Casino, Worley	
56	Loss	41–14–1	(United States) Felix Cora Jr.	TKO	8	27/10/2005	(United States) Coeur d'Alene Casino, Worley	NABF Cruiserweight Title.
55	Win	41–13–1	(United States) Ali Supreme	KO	3	16/06/2005	(United States) Coeur d'Alene Casino, Worley	NABF Cruiserweight Title.
54	Loss	40–13–1	(United States) Danny Batchelder	SD	10	14/05/2005	(United States) Delta Center, Salt Lake City	
53	Win	40–12–1	(United States) Tim Shocks	UD	8	24/03/2005	(United States) Coeur d'Alene Casino, Worley	
52	Win	39–12–1	(United States) Luke Munsen	TKO	8	19/08/2004	(United States) Coeur d'Alene Casino, Worley	Referee stopped the bout at 1:08 of the eighth round.
51	Loss	38–12–1	(United States) Charles Davis	UD	10	29/07/2004	(United States) Oakland Arena, Oakland	
50	Loss	38–11–1	(United Kingdom) David Haye	TKO	3	12/05/2004	(United Kingdom) Rivermead Leisure Centre, Reading	Referee stopped the bout at 2:48 of the third round.
49	Loss	38–10–1	(Russia) Vadim Tokarev	UD	10	29/04/2004	(Russia) Basket-Hall Arena, Kazan	
48	Win	38–9–1	(United States) Marcus Harvey	TKO	1	20/02/2004	(United States) Ramada Inn, Norwalk	Referee stopped the bout at 1:12 of the first round.
47	Loss	37–9–1	(United States) Rydell Booker	UD	10	13/06/2003	(United States) Joe Louis Arena, Detroit	
46	Win	37–8–1	(United States) Wesley Martin	TD	5	28/03/2003	(United States) Bicycle Casino, Bell Gardens	
45	Loss	36–8–1	(Jamaica) O'Neil Bell	TKO	9	08/11/2002	(United States) Stratosphere Hotel & Casino, Las Vegas	
44	Win	36–7–1	(United States) Don Normand	KO	1	24/08/2002	(United States) Sam's Town Hotel & Gambling Hall, Las Vegas	Normand knocked out at 1:39 of the first round.
43	Win	35–7–1	(United States) Darryl Hollowell	TKO	2	07/06/2002	(United States) DeSoto Civic Center, Southaven	Referee stopped the bout at 0:28 of the second round.
42	Loss	34–7–1	(United States) Kelvin Davis	SD	12	23/03/2002	(United States) Aladdin Theater, Las Vegas	
41	Loss	34–6–1	(Jamaica) O'Neil Bell	TKO	11	07/09/2001	(United States) Dakota Magic Casino, Hankinson	NABF Cruiserweight Title.
40	Win	34–5–1	(United States) Gary Wilcox	SD	10	24/02/2001	(United States) Ice Palace, Tampa	
39	Win	33–5–1	(United States) Ray Berry	TKO	9	10/08/2000	(United States) Grand Casino, Biloxi	Referee stopped the bout at 1:59 of the ninth round.
38	Win	32–5–1	(United States) Darren Zenner	UD	10	15/10/1999	(United States) Bayfront Auditorium, Pensacola	
37	Win	31–5–1	(United States) Dan Ward	TKO	6	01/10/1999	(United States) Grand Casino, Tunica	
36	Loss	30–5–1	(Kazakhstan) Vassiliy Jirov	TKO	7	Jun 5, 1999	(United States) Mississippi Coast Coliseum, Biloxi, Mississippi	Lost IBF cruiserweight title
35	Win	30–4–1	(United States) Art Jimmerson	KO	1	09/01/1999	(United States) Civic Center, Pensacola	
34	Win	29–4–1	(United States) Imamu Mayfield	TKO	9	30/10/1998	(United States) Grand Casino, Biloxi	Won IBF cruiserweight title
33	Win	28–4–1	(United States) Adolpho Washington	UD	12	06/01/1998	(United States) Casino Magic, Bay Saint Louis	
32	Win	27–4–1	(United States) Steve Little	UD	12	09/09/1997	(United States) Fernwood Resort, Bushkill	
31	Win	26–4–1	(United States) Rick Roufus	TKO	4	22/02/1997	(Puerto Rico) Condado	
30	Win	25–4–1	(United States) John Kiser	TKO	5	27/06/1995	(Canada) Convention Centre, Edmonton	Referee stopped the bout at 1:38 of the fifth round.
29	Loss	24–4–1	(United States) Chris Byrd	SD	10	23/05/1995	(United States) The Palace, Auburn Hills	
28	Win	24–3–1	(United States) Jason Nicholson	TKO	6	17/02/1995	(United States) Silver Nugget, North Las Vegas	Referee stopped the bout at 1:45 of the sixth round.
27	Win	23–3–1	(United States) Jeff Williams	TKO	1	29/12/1994	(United States) Silver Nugget, North Las Vegas	
26	Win	22–3–1	(United States) Michael Green	PTS	8	20/10/1994	(United States) Silver Nugget, North Las Vegas	
25	Loss	21–3–1	(United States) Orlin Norris	TKO	3	02/07/1994	(United States) The Mirage, Las Vegas	For WBA cruiserweight title
24	Loss	21–2–1	(United States) Orlin Norris	SD	12	04/03/1994	(United States) MGM Grand Garden Arena, Las Vegas	For WBA cruiserweight title
23	Win	21–1–1	(United States) Matthew Brooks	TKO	3	15/12/1993	(United States) Aladdin Theater, Las Vegas	
22	Win	20–1–1	(United States) David Gamble	TKO	2	23/10/1993	(United States) Broward Co Convention Center, Fort Lauderdale	
21	Win	19–1–1	(United States) Jeff Lampkin	UD	10	08/06/1993	(United States) Riviera Hotel & Casino, Las Vegas	
20	Win	18–1–1	(Latvia) Yuri Vaulin	TKO	11	16/12/1992	(United States) Riviera Hotel & Casino, Las Vegas	
19	Win	17–1–1	(Mexico) Jose Macias Chong	TKO	1	26/06/1992	(United States) Union Plaza Casino, Las Vegas	
18	Win	16–1–1	(United States) Dwight Muhammad Qawi	UD	10	08/05/1992	(United States) Riviera Hotel & Casino, Las Vegas	
17	Win	15–1–1	(United States) Sean McClain	TKO	1	28/03/1992	(United States) Aladdin Theater, Las Vegas	Referee stopped the bout at 1:38 of the first round.
16	Win	14–1–1	(United States) Randy Leaks	KO	3	26/11/1991	(United States) Country Club, Reseda	
15	Win	13–1–1	(United States) Keith McMurray	TKO	2	12/11/1991	(United States) Union Plaza Casino, Las Vegas	
14	Win	12–1–1	(United States) Terry Verners	KO	1	11/10/1991	(United States) Union Plaza Casino, Las Vegas	
13	Win	11–1–1	(United States) Sim Warrior	TKO	2	13/09/1991	(United States) Union Plaza Casino, Las Vegas	
12	Loss	10–1–1	(United States) Sim Warrior	KO	3	06/07/1991	(United States) Union Plaza Casino, Las Vegas	
11	Win	10–0–1	(United States) Keith McMurray	UD	8	15/05/1991	(United States) Union Plaza Casino, Las Vegas	
10	Win	9–0–1	(United States) Joey Parker	KO	4	24/04/1991	(United States) Hacienda Hotel, Las Vegas	
9	Win	8–0–1	(United States) Joey Parker	UD	10	20/02/1991	(United States) Hacienda Hotel, Las Vegas	
8	Win	7–0–1	(United States) Armando Hurtado	TKO	1	27/12/1990	(United States) Hacienda Hotel, Las Vegas	
7	Win	6–0–1	(United States) Scott Fusci	TKO	4	21/11/1990	(United States) Hacienda Hotel, Las Vegas	
6	Win	5–0–1	(United States) Terry Verners	PTS	8	08/10/1990	(United States) Great Western Forum, Inglewood	
5	Win	4–0–1	(United States) Greg Steward	KO	1	22/09/1990	(United States) Great Western Forum, Inglewood	
4	Draw	3–0–1	(United States) Sylvester White	PTS	4	11/05/1990	(United States) Bayfront Auditorium, Pensacola	
3	Win	3–0	(United States) Anthony Harris	KO	1	28/03/1990	(United States) Interstate Fairgrounds, Pensacola	Harris knocked out at 1:36 of the first round.
2	Win	2–0	(United States) Paul Jones	KO	2	28/02/1990	(United States) Interstate Fairgrounds, Pensacola	Jones knocked out at 0:42 of the second round.
1	Win	1–0	(United States) Kevin Poindexter	KO	1	30/11/1989	(United States) Bayfront Auditorium, Pensacola	Poindexter knocked out at 2:10 of the first round.

== See also ==
- List of world cruiserweight boxing champions

Sporting positions
Regional boxing titles
Preceded by Ali Supreme	NABF Cruiserweight champion June 16, 2005 – October 27, 2005	Succeeded by Felix Cora Jr.
World boxing titles
Preceded by Imamu Mayfield	IBF Cruiserweight champion October 30, 1998 – June 5, 1999	Succeeded by Vassiliy Jirov
