= James Heath (boxer) =

American boxer (born 1960)

James Heath (born February 17, 1960) is an American former professional boxer who competed from 1985 to 1996. He twice challenged for the WBA cruiserweight title between 1994 and 1996.

== Career ==
Heath turned professional in 1985, winning his debut against Jessie Brown in 3 rounds. Heath was given the opportunity to fight Orlin Norris for the WBA cruiserweight title in Mexico after 10 fights. Heath was knocked out in the second round. Heath's second world title shot came 2 years later against Nate Miller. The result was a 7th-round technical knockout going Miller's way. Shortly after Heath retired.

Heath also won the NABF cruiserweight title in 1995.

== Professional boxing record ==
9 Wins (7 knockouts, 2 decisions), 4 Losses (3 knockouts, 1 decision), 2 Draws Archived October 16, 2012, at the Wayback Machine
Result	Record	Opponent	Type	Round	Date	Location	Notes
Loss	9–4–2	(United States) Nate Miller	TKO	7	31/08/1996	(Republic of Ireland) Dublin, Ireland	For WBA cruiserweight title
Loss	9–3–2	(United States) Brian LaSpada	TKO	10	26/01/1996	Paradise, Nevada, U.S.	For NABF cruiserweight title. Referee stopped the bout at 1:35 of the tenth round.
Win	9–2–2	(United States) Fabian Garcia	TKO	7	22/02/1995	(New York (state)) Rochester, New York, U.S.	
Win	8–2–2	(United States) John McClain	PTS	12	27/01/1995	(Georgia (U.S. state)) Doraville, Georgia, U.S.	For vacant NABF cruiserweight title.
Loss	7–2–2	(United States) Orlin Norris	KO	2	12/11/1994	Mexico City, Mexico	For WBA cruiserweight title. Heath knocked out at 2:46 of the second round.
Win	7–1–2	(United States) Willie Jake	KO	9	09/07/1994	Charlotte, North Carolina, U.S.	Won IBC cruiserweight title
Win	6–1–2	(United States) J.B. Williamson	TKO	3	19/02/1994	Charlotte, North Carolina, U.S.	
Win	5–1–2	(United States) Mike Waters	KO	1	08/10/1993	Charlotte, North Carolina, U.S.	
Loss	4–1–2	(United States) Robert Daniels	PTS	10	13/02/1993	Miami, Florida, U.S.	
Win	4–0–2	(Argentina) Reinaldo Gimenez	TKO	6	12/12/1992	Miami, Florida, U.S.	
Win	3–0–2	Emmanuel Spence	PTS	6	23/06/1992	Tallahassee, Florida, U.S.	
Win	2–0–2	(United States) Frankie Hines	KO	2	02/05/1992	Denver, North Carolina, U.S.	
Draw	1–0–2	(United States) Danny Wofford	PTS	4	24/10/1987	Winston-Salem, North Carolina, U.S.	
Draw	1–0–1	(United States) Maurice Moore	PTS	4	07/10/1987	Charlotte, North Carolina, U.S.	
Win	1–0	(United States) Jessie Brown	KO	3	28/03/1985	Charleston, South Carolina, U.S.	

== Personal life ==
Heath is a native of Monroe, North Carolina.
