= Denis Boytsov =

Russian boxer (1986–2026)

- Boytsov in 2014

Personal information
- Nationality: Russian
- Born: Denis Nikolayevich Boytsov; 14 February 1986 Oryol, Russian SFSR, Soviet Union
- Died: 17 October 2026 (aged 40) Berlin, Germany
- Height: 1.85 m (6 ft 1 in)
- Weight: Heavyweight

Boxing career
- Stance: Orthodox

Boxing record
- Total fights: 37
- Wins: 36
- Win by KO: 27
- Losses: 1
Medal record
Men's amateur boxing
Representing Russia
World Junior Championships
Gold medal – first place	2004 Jeju	Super-heavyweight

Denis Nikolayevich Boytsov (Russian: Денис Николаевич Бойцов; 14 February 1986 – 17 October 2026) was a Russian professional boxer who competed from 2004 to 2015.

== Early life ==
Denis Boytsov was born in Oryol, on 14 February 1986.

== Amateur career ==
Boytsov had a decorated amateur career, including the following accomplishments:

- 2001 won Cadet World Championship at Light Middleweight in Baku, Azerbaijan.
- 2002 won Cadet World Championship at Heavyweight in Kecskemet, Hungary.
- 2004 won Junior World Championship at Superheavyweight in Jeju, South Korea.

His record was 115-15.

== Professional career ==
Boytsov turned pro in 2004 in Germany and won his first 20 bouts with 18 KOs. Later his opponents included Vincent Maddalone and Israel Carlos Garcia.

== Personal life ==
On 3 May 2015, Boytsov was found unconscious in a Berlin subway tunnel. Due to a severe head injury, he was placed in a medically induced coma for seven weeks, and retired from professional boxing. Ramzan Kadyrov agreed to cover Boytsov's medical bills after his bank accounts were blocked.

Boytsov lived in Germany for more than 10 years before the accident, which was initially related to his boxing activities, as he received multiple death threats in 2013. A German court later ruled that Boytsov fell on tracks while being intoxicated.

== Death ==
Boytsov's death, at the age of 40, was announced on 17 October 2026.

== Professional boxing record ==
37 fights	36 wins	1 loss
By knockout	27	0
By decision	9	1

No.	Result	Record	Opponent	Type	Round, time	Date	Location	Notes
37	Win	36–1	Irineu Beato Costa Junior	RTD	2 (10), 3:00	21 Mar 2015	Rostock, Germany	
36	Win	35–1	George Arias	UD	8	6 Dec 2014	Large EWE Arena, Oldenburg, Germany	
35	Win	34–1	Timur Stark	UD	10	30 Aug 2014	Gerry Weber Stadion, Halle, Germany	
34	Loss	33–1	Alex Leapai	UD	10	23 Nov 2013	Stechert Arena, Bamberg, Germany	For WBO Asia Pacific heavyweight title
33	Win	33–0	Oleksandr Nesterenko	KO	3 (8), 2:15	15 Jun 2013	Karl-Eckel-Weg Halle, Hattersheim am Main, Germany	
32	Win	32–0	Samir Kurtagic	UD	8	15 Feb 2013	BC Noble Art, Deinze, Belgium	
31	Win	31–0	Dominick Guinn	UD	10	13 Apr 2012	Lanxess Arena, Cologne, Germany	
30	Win	30–0	Darnell Wilson	KO	4 (8), 0:45	28 Jan 2012	Grand Elysée Hotel, Hamburg, Germany	
29	Win	29–0	Matthew Greer	TKO	6 (8), 1:25	24 Sep 2011	Dima-Sportcenter, Hamburg, Germany	
28	Win	28–0	Mike Sheppard	KO	2 (8), 1:18	19 Nov 2010	Universum Gym, Hamburg, Germany	
27	Win	27–0	Kevin Montiy	KO	2 (10), 1:56	9 Jan 2010	Bördelandhalle, Magdeburg, Germany	
26	Win	26–0	Jason Gavern	KO	7 (10), 2:08	10 Oct 2009	StadtHalle, Rostock, Germany	
25	Win	25–0	Taras Bidenko	TKO	6 (12), 2:00	6 Jun 2009	König Pilsener Arena, Oberhausen, Germany	Retained WBA Inter-Continental heavyweight title; Won vacant WBO European heavyweight title
24	Win	24–0	Israel Garcia	TKO	2 (12), 2:17	7 Feb 2009	StadtHalle, Rostock, Germany	Won vacant WBA Inter-Continental heavyweight title
23	Win	23–0	Vinny Maddalone	UD	8	15 Nov 2008	Burg-Wächter Castello, Düsseldorf, Germany	
22	Win	22–0	Fernely Feliz	UD	10	5 Jul 2008	Gerry Weber Stadion, Halle, Germany	
21	Win	21–0	Robert Hawkins	UD	8	26 Apr 2008	Freiberger Arena, Dresden, Germany	
20	Win	20–0	Tommy Connelly	TKO	1 (8), 1:51	19 Jan 2008	Burg-Wächter Castello, Düsseldorf, Germany	
19	Win	19–0	Ademar Leonardo Correa	KO	1 (8), 0:58	30 Nov 2007	Dm-Arena, Karlsruhe, Germany	
18	Win	18–0	Juan Antonio Diaz	UD	6	14 Jul 2007	Color Line Arena, Hamburg, Germany	
17	Win	17–0	Sam Ubokane	KO	1 (8), 1:27	27 Jan 2007	Burg-Wächter Castello, Düsseldorf, Germany	
16	Win	16–0	Ondřej Pála	TKO	5 (10), 1:16	9 Sep 2006	Bördelandhalle, Magdeburg, Germany	Won vacant WBC Youth heavyweight title
15	Win	15–0	Edson Cesar Antonio	UD	8	25 Jul 2006	Sportschule Sachsenwald, Hamburg, Germany	
14	Win	14–0	Jucimar Francisco Hipolito	KO	1 (6), 1:56	27 May 2006	Zenith, Munich, Germany	
13	Win	13–0	Radoslav Milutinovic	KO	2 (6), 2:55	7 Mar 2006	Kugelbake-Halle, Cuxhaven, Germany	
12	Win	12–0	Hein van Bosch	TKO	6 (6), 0:01	4 Feb 2006	Burg-Wächter Castello, Düsseldorf, Germany	
11	Win	11–0	Zoltán Petrányi	KO	2 (6), 2:58	13 Dec 2005	Freizeit Arena, Sölden, Austria	
10	Win	10–0	Ihar Shukala	KO	1 (4), 1:25	25 Oct 2005	Studio 44, Vienna, Austria	
9	Win	9–0	János Somogyi	TKO	1 (4), 3:00	28 Sep 2005	Color Line Arena, Hamburg, Germany	
8	Win	8–0	Jerome Guennou	KO	1 (4), 1:36	2 Jul 2005	Color Line Arena, Hamburg, Germany	
7	Win	7–0	O'Neil Murray	TKO	1 (4), 1:07	28 Jun 2005	Kugelbake-Halle, Cuxhaven, Germany	
6	Win	6–0	Vance Winn	KO	1 (4), 2:05	26 Feb 2005	Color Line Arena, Hamburg, Germany	
5	Win	5–0	Ladislav Slezak	KO	1 (4), 1:44	15 Jan 2005	Bördelandhalle, Magdeburg, Germany	
4	Win	4–0	Aleh Tsukanau	TKO	2 (4), 0:51	14 Dec 2004	Freizeit Arena, Sölden, Austria	
3	Win	3–0	Aleh Dubiaha	TKO	1 (4), 2:29	16 Nov 2004	Kugelbake-Halle, Cuxhaven, Germany	
2	Win	2–0	Ervin Slonka	TKO	1 (4), 2:50	26 Oct 2004	Scandlines Arena, Rostock, Germany	
1	Win	1–0	Imrich Borka	TKO	1 (4), 2:29	21 Sep 2004	Universum Gym, Hamburg, Germany	

Sporting positions
Regional boxing titles
Vacant Title last held by Chauncy Welliver	WBC Youth heavyweight champion 9 September 2006 – February 2008; Vacated	Vacant Title next held by Francesco Pianeta
Vacant Title last held by Taras Bidenko	WBA Inter-Continental heavyweight champion 7 February 2009 – April 2011; Vacated	Vacant Title next held by Robert Helenius
New title	WBO European heavyweight champion 6 June 2009 – October 2010; Vacated	Vacant Title next held by Ondřej Pála
