= Tomasz Adamek =

Polish boxer (born 1976)

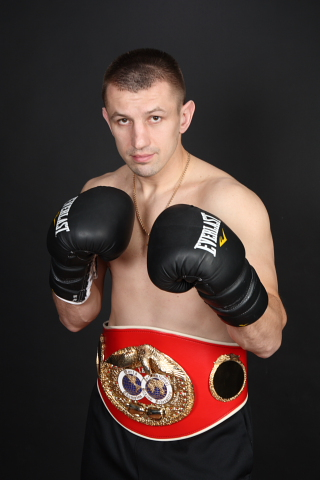
- Adamek with the IBF title, 2008

Personal information
- Nickname: Góral
- Born: 1 December 1976 (age 49) Żywiec, Poland
- Height: 1.87 m (6 ft 2 in)
- Weight: Light heavyweight; Cruiserweight; Heavyweight

Boxing career
- Reach: 191 cm (75 in)

Boxing record
- Total fights: 61
- Wins: 55
- Win by KO: 32
- Losses: 6
Medal record
Men's amateur boxing
Representing Poland
European Championships
| Bronze medal – third place | 1998 Minsk | Light heavyweight |

Tomasz "Tomek" Adamek (Polish pronunciation: [ˈtɔmaʂ aˈdamɛk]; born 1 December 1976) is a Polish former professional boxer who competed from 1999 to 2018. He held world championships in two weight classes, including the WBC light heavyweight title from 2005 to 2007, and the IBF and The Ring magazine cruiserweight titles from 2008 to 2009. He also held the IBO cruiserweight title in 2007, and challenged once for the WBC heavyweight title in 2011. BoxRec ranks Adamek as the third greatest Polish boxer of all time, pound for pound. He is the first Polish boxer to win The Ring title.

== Early life ==
Adamek was born in Żywiec, Poland, as of 2012 he resided in Kearny, New Jersey. In 2013, he became a resident of Jersey City where he also trained and fought out of.

== Professional career ==
Adamek made his professional boxing debut on 13 March 1999 in Manchester, England against Israel Khumalo. He won by TKO in the first round.

=== Light-heavyweight ===
==== WBC light-heavyweight champion ====
Adamek won the vacant WBC light-heavyweight title defeating Paul "Firepower" Briggs by majority decision on 21 May 2005. The fight was described by some as one of the most brutal in recent memory, as Briggs suffered a large cut above his left eye early in the fight and Adamek bled profusely from his nose for much of the fight as well. Adamek tended to be the aggressor and won the fight.

On 15 October 2005, he defended his title against German boxer Thomas Ulrich by knockout in Round 6.

He then defended his title in a rematch with Paul Briggs in 2006, again winning by majority decision. After the fight Jim Lampley said that Adamek vs Briggs I and II was the best combined 24 rounds he has ever seen.

==== Adamek vs. Dawson ====
Undefeated Adamek with 31–0 (21 KO) lost his first fight by unanimous decision to Chad Dawson on 3 February 2007. During that fight, Adamek was knocked down in the seventh round; this was only the second time in his career he has been knocked down (upon slow-motion replay, Adamek was shown to have tripped on Dawson's foot after the body shot). Adamek, well behind on points, provided some drama by suddenly dropping Dawson in the 10th round but Dawson fended off the onslaught that followed, and won a clear-cut points decision. Immediately following the loss to Dawson, Adamek decided to move up in the cruiserweight division.

=== Cruiserweight ===
After losing to Dawson, Adamek moved up to cruiserweight to beat Luis Andres Pineda by technical knockout in round seven. He defeated Josip Jalusic on 29 December 2007 in Germany.

==== Adamek vs. Bell ====
On 19 April 2008, in Poland, Adamek fought former undisputed cruiserweight champion O'Neil Bell in an IBF Cruiserweight title eliminator. Adamek floored Bell in round one and had good success by outboxing Bell. Bell opted not to come out for round eight, citing that he felt dizzy and ill.

==== IBF and lineal cruiserweight champion ====
In December 2008 he fought the then reigning champion Steve Cunningham at the Prudential Center in Newark, New Jersey. Knocking a game Cunningham down three times, he won the IBF and vacant lineal cruiserweight titles in a bout many thought was the fight of the year.

Adamek successfully defended his title against Johnathon Banks on 27 February 2009, at the Prudential Center in Newark. He won with a brutal TKO in the 8th Round. He then went on to defeat Bobby Gunn before a large crowd at the Prudential Center on 11 July 2009, with the referee stopping the bout at the ring physician's advice between rounds four and five.

He vacated the IBF title on 18 October 2009, choosing to move up to the heavyweight division.

=== Heavyweight ===
On 24 October 2009 in Łódź, Poland, Adamek defeated Andrew Golota by TKO in the fifth round to win the IBF "International" Heavyweight Title. Then, on 6 February 2010 in Newark's Prudential Center he defeated Jason Estrada by unanimous decision after 12 rounds.

Adamek (40–1; 27 KO) then took on fellow heavyweight contender Chris Arreola (28–1; 25 KO) on 24 April 2010, at the Citizens Business Bank Arena in Ontario, California. The bout was televised as part of Boxing After Dark. The Polish fighter won a twelve-round majority decision, with the scores of 114–114, 115–113, and 117–111. A day before the bout, Arreola weighed 250½ pounds, while Adamek was 217.

In 2010 he was the first Polish winner of the "Muhammad Ali Athlete Award" at the Giant Awards diner in Chicago.

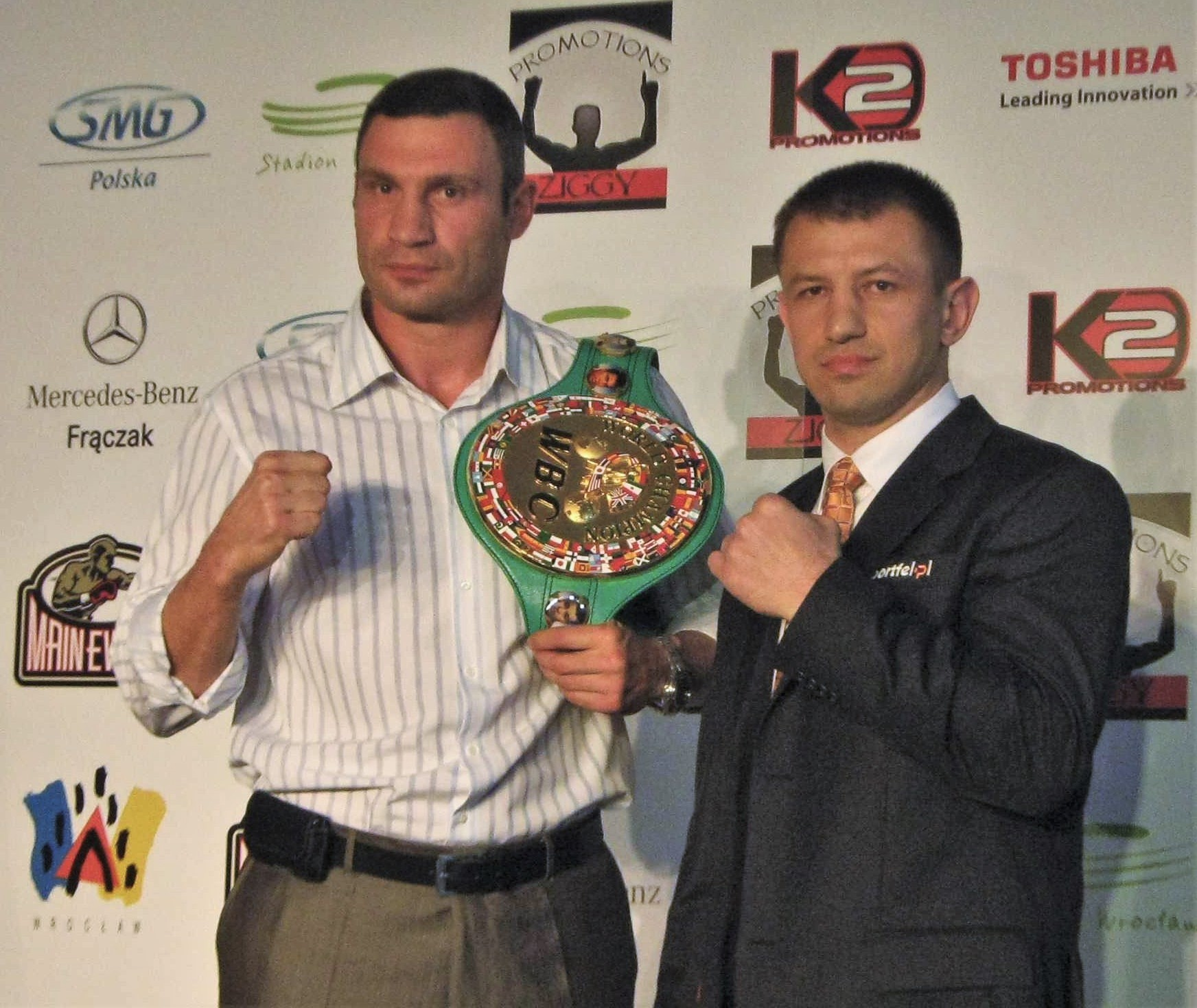
Klitschko and Adamek, during signing for the fight in 2011

Adamek defeated veteran American Michael Grant by unanimous decision on 21 August 2010. In his first fight of 2011, Adamek defeated Irishman Kevin McBride by a wide unanimous decision.

==== Adamek vs. Vitali Klitschko ====
On 10 September 2011 Adamek faced the WBC heavyweight champion Vitali Klitschko in Poland, losing by TKO in the 10th round, in the first ever PPV fight in Polish TV history. The referee stopped the bout after Adamek received punishing blows and was ruled out, as he was no longer able to defend himself.

==== Post-Klitschko fights ====
Adamek returned on 24 March 2012, after signing a contract with Main Events, defeating Nagy Aguilera by unanimous decision. He then agreed to face former heavyweight contender Eddie Chambers. Both Adamek and Chambers were praised for taking the fight with no world title nor mandatory position on the line. Coming into the fight, Adamek was ranked No.3 heavyweight contender by The Ring, while Chambers, having had only one fight in two years and three months, was unranked by the publication. The fight was the main event of the Fight Night card on NBC Sports. In the opening rounds, both fighters were trading shots, with Chambers landing the most meaningful punches. During the first round, Chambers torn his bicep in the left arm, and often switched between orthodox and southpaw stances throughout the rest of the fight, throwing shots almost exclusively with the right hand, mostly connecting with overhand punches. Adamek was more active since round 3, frequently switching up from counterpuncher to aggressor. The bout lasted full twelve rounds, with Adamek being declared the winner by unanimous decision with scores 116–112 (twice) and 119–109. According to CompuBox, 1,381 punches were thrown, with Chambers landing 152 punches out of 462 thrown (32.9% accuracy), while Adamek landed 134 punches out of 919 (14.6%).

Adamek defeated Travis Walker on 8 September 2012 via fifth-round technical knockout at 1:51 due to a stoppage by the referee.

Adamek defeated Steve Cunningham in a very close and somewhat controversial split decision on 22 December 2012. Initially, the result was a draw, but after noticing a mathematical miscalculation in the judges scorecards, Adamek was declared the winner. On 15 March 2014 Adamek was defeated by Vyacheslav Glazkov by unanimous decision after 12 rounds, losing his IBF North American heavyweight title.

==== Adamek vs Haumono ====
On June 24, 2017, Adamek defeated Solomon Haumono via unanimous decision, 100–90, 99–91 and 99–91 on the scorecards.

==== Adamek vs. Kassi ====
On November 18, 2017, Adamek fought and defeated Fred Kassi via unanimous decision, 97–93, 96–94 and 96–94 on the scorecards.

==== Adamek vs. Miller ====
On October 6, 2018, Adamek fought heavyweight contender Jarell Miller. Miller was ranked #2 by the WBA and #5 by the WBO at the time. Miller dropped Adamek twice in the second round. After the second knockdown the referee stopped the fight despite a disoriented Adamek making it to his feet.

==== Adamek vs. Khalidov ====
On February 24, 2024, in the main event of XTB KSW Epic: Chalidow vs Adamek, he fought Mamed Khalidov in a boxing match in the cage. The fight was contracted for 6 rounds with Adamek's purse being 250,000 USD. He won after the third round after Khalidov suffered a hand injury in the round.

== Professional boxing record ==
| 63 fights | 56 wins | 7 losses |
|---|---|---|
| By knockout | 31 | 3 |
| By decision | 25 | 4 |

| No. | Result | Record | Opponent | Type | Round, time | Date | Location | Notes |
|---|---|---|---|---|---|---|---|---|
| 59 | Loss | 53–6 | Jarrell Miller | KO | 2 (12), 0:51 | 6 Oct 2018 | Wintrust Arena, Chicago, Illinois, US | |
| 58 | Win | 53–5 | Joey Abell | TKO | 7 (10), 2:33 | 21 Apr 2018 | Hala Sportowa, Częstochowa, Poland | Retained Poland International heavyweight title |
| 57 | Win | 52–5 | Fred Kassi | UD | 10 | 18 Nov 2017 | Hala Sportowa, Częstochowa, Poland | Won vacant Poland International heavyweight title |
| 56 | Win | 51–5 | Solomon Haumono | UD | 10 | 24 Jun 2017 | Ergo Arena, Gdańsk, Poland | |
| 55 | Loss | 50–5 | Éric Molina | KO | 10 (12), 3:00 | 2 Apr 2016 | Tauron Arena, Kraków, Poland | For vacant IBF Inter-Continental heavyweight title |
| 54 | Win | 50–4 | Przemysław Saleta | RTD | 5 (10), 3:00 | 26 Sep 2015 | Atlas Arena, Łódź, Poland | |
| 53 | Loss | 49–4 | Artur Szpilka | UD | 10 | 8 Nov 2014 | Tauron Arena, Kraków, Poland | For vacant IBF International and Poland International heavyweight titles |
| 52 | Loss | 49–3 | Vyacheslav Glazkov | UD | 12 | 15 Mar 2014 | Sands Casino Resort, Bethlehem, Pennsylvania, US | Lost IBF North American heavyweight title |
| 51 | Win | 49–2 | Dominick Guinn | UD | 10 | 3 Aug 2013 | Mohegan Sun Arena, Montville, Connecticut, US | |
| 50 | Win | 48–2 | Steve Cunningham | SD | 12 | 22 Dec 2012 | Sands Casino Resort, Bethlehem, Pennsylvania, US | Retained IBF North American heavyweight title |
| 49 | Win | 47–2 | Travis Walker | TKO | 5 (12), 1:08 | 8 Sep 2012 | Prudential Center, Newark, New Jersey, US | Retained IBF North American heavyweight title |
| 48 | Win | 46–2 | Eddie Chambers | UD | 12 | 16 Jun 2012 | Prudential Center, Newark, New Jersey, US | Won vacant IBF North American heavyweight title |
| 47 | Win | 45–2 | Nagy Aguilera | UD | 10 | 24 Mar 2012 | Aviator Sports and Events Center, New York City, New York, US | |
| 46 | Loss | 44–2 | Vitali Klitschko | TKO | 10 (12), 2:20 | 10 Sep 2011 | Stadion Miejski, Wrocław, Poland | For WBC heavyweight title |
| 45 | Win | 44–1 | Kevin McBride | UD | 12 | 9 Apr 2011 | Prudential Center, Newark, New Jersey, US | Retained IBF International and NABO heavyweight titles |
| 44 | Win | 43–1 | Vinny Maddalone | TKO | 5 (12), 2:17 | 9 Dec 2010 | Prudential Center, Newark, New Jersey, US | Retained IBF International and NABO heavyweight titles |
| 43 | Win | 42–1 | Michael Grant | UD | 12 | 21 Aug 2010 | Prudential Center, Newark, New Jersey, US | Retained IBF International and NABO heavyweight titles |
| 42 | Win | 41–1 | Chris Arreola | MD | 12 | 24 Apr 2010 | Citizens Business Bank Arena, Ontario, California, US | Retained IBF International heavyweight title; Won vacant NABO heavyweight title |
| 41 | Win | 40–1 | Jason Estrada | UD | 12 | 6 Feb 2010 | Prudential Center, Newark, New Jersey, US | Retained IBF International heavyweight title |
| 40 | Win | 39–1 | Andrew Golota | TKO | 5 (12), 1:20 | 24 Oct 2009 | Atlas Arena, Łódź, Poland | Won vacant IBF International heavyweight title |
| 39 | Win | 38–1 | Bobby Gunn | RTD | 4 (12), 3:00 | 11 Jul 2009 | Prudential Center, Newark, New Jersey, US | Retained IBF and The Ring cruiserweight titles |
| 38 | Win | 37–1 | Johnathon Banks | TKO | 8 (12), 1:30 | 27 Feb 2009 | Prudential Center, Newark, New Jersey, US | Retained IBF and The Ring cruiserweight titles |
| 37 | Win | 36–1 | Steve Cunningham | SD | 12 | 11 Dec 2008 | Prudential Center, Newark, New Jersey, US | Won IBF and vacant The Ring cruiserweight titles |
| 36 | Win | 35–1 | Gary Gomez | RTD | 7 (10), 0:01 | 11 Jul 2008 | Aragon Ballroom, Chicago, Illinois, US | |
| 35 | Win | 34–1 | O'Neil Bell | TKO | 8 (12) | 19 Apr 2008 | Spodek, Katowice, Poland | |
| 34 | Win | 33–1 | Josip Jalusic | UD | 8 | 29 Dec 2007 | Seidensticker Halle, Bielefeld, Germany | |
| 33 | Win | 32–1 | Luis Andres Pineda | TKO | 7 (12) | 9 Jun 2007 | Spodek, Katowice, Poland | Won vacant IBO cruiserweight title |
| 32 | Loss | 31–1 | Chad Dawson | UD | 12 | 3 Feb 2007 | Silver Spurs Arena, Kissimmee, Florida, US | Lost WBC light heavyweight title |
| 31 | Win | 31–0 | Paul Briggs | MD | 12 | 7 Oct 2006 | Allstate Arena, Rosemont, Illinois, US | Retained WBC light heavyweight title |
| 30 | Win | 30–0 | Thomas Ulrich | KO | 6 (12), 1:57 | 15 Oct 2005 | Mehrzweckhalle Süd, Düsseldorf, Germany | Retained WBC light heavyweight title |
| 29 | Win | 29–0 | Paul Briggs | MD | 12 | 21 May 2005 | United Center, Chicago, Illinois, US | Won vacant WBC light heavyweight title |
| 28 | Win | 28–0 | Ismail Abdoul | UD | 8 | 10 Sep 2004 | Blue City, Warsaw, Poland | |
| 27 | Win | 27–0 | Dzhabrail Dzhabrailov | KO | 5 (12), 0:43 | 17 Apr 2004 | Baltic Hall, Mariehamn, Finland | Won vacant WBO Inter-Continental light heavyweight title |
| 26 | Win | 26–0 | Olivier Beard | TKO | 3 (10) | 20 Dec 2003 | BBTS Wlokniarz Hall, Bielsko-Biała, Poland | |
| 25 | Win | 25–0 | Ed Dalton | KO | 2 (12), 2:14 | 4 Oct 2003 | Baltic Hall, Mariehamn, Finland | Won vacant IBF Inter-Continental light heavyweight title |
| 24 | Win | 24–0 | Roberto Coelho | UD | 8 | 30 Aug 2003 | Olympiahalle, Munich, Germany | |
| 23 | Win | 23–0 | Zoltán Béres | UD | 6 | 6 Apr 2003 | Palacio de Deportes, Benidorm, Spain | |
| 22 | Win | 22–0 | Andrei Karsten | TKO | 2 (6) | 15 Feb 2003 | Töölö Sports Hall, Helsinki, Finland | |
| 21 | Win | 21–0 | Varuzhan Davtyan | RTD | 4 (6), 3:00 | 14 Dec 2002 | Telewest Arena, Newcastle, England | |
| 20 | Win | 20–0 | Laverne Clark | TKO | 3 (12) | 18 Oct 2002 | Sport Hall, Kozienice, Poland | Won vacant Poland International light heavyweight title |
| 19 | Win | 19–0 | Mihai Iftode | UD | 8 | 27 Jul 2002 | Hala Milenium, Kołobrzeg, Poland | |
| 18 | Win | 18–0 | Siarhei Karanevich | UD | 10 | 24 May 2002 | Płońsk, Poland | Won vacant CISBB light heavyweight titles |
| 17 | Win | 17–0 | Willie McDonald | TKO | 3 (6) | 6 Apr 2002 | Łódź, Poland | |
| 16 | Win | 16–0 | Dzianis Salomka | TKO | 5 (6) | 23 Feb 2002 | OSiR, Włocławek, Poland | |
| 15 | Win | 15–0 | Ruslan Hladkykh | UD | 6 | 29 Dec 2001 | Sport Hall, Konin, Poland | |
| 14 | Win | 14–0 | Zdravko Kostic | UD | 10 | 10 Nov 2001 | Sport Hall, Włocławek, Poland | |
| 13 | Win | 13–0 | Timofey Maklakov | TKO | 3 (10) | 11 Aug 2001 | Sport Hall, Jaworzno, Poland | |
| 12 | Win | 12–0 | Ion Voica | KO | 1 (6) | 18 May 2001 | Sport Hall, Warsaw, Poland | |
| 11 | Win | 11–0 | Rudi Lupo | UD | 10 | 2 Mar 2001 | Sport Hall, Warsaw, Poland | Won IBC Inter-Continental light heavyweight title |
| 10 | Win | 10–0 | Nino Cirilo | TKO | 3 (8) | 3 Nov 2000 | Sport Hall, Nowy Dwór, Poland | |
| 9 | Win | 9–0 | Stanislav Schreiber | TKO | 3 (10) | 14 Oct 2000 | Sport Hall, Dębica, Poland | |
| 8 | Win | 8–0 | Glenn Odem | TKO | 4 (6) | 10 Jun 2000 | Sport Hall, Elbląg, Poland | |
| 7 | Win | 7–0 | Terry Ford | TKO | 3 (6) | 25 Mar 2000 | Białystok, Poland | |
| 6 | Win | 6–0 | Mark Lee Dawson | TKO | 3 (6) | 21 Feb 2000 | Elephant and Castle Shopping Centre, London, England | |
| 5 | Win | 5–0 | Melvin Wynn | TKO | 3 (6) | 10 Dec 1999 | Warsaw, Poland | |
| 4 | Win | 4–0 | Kevin Whaley-El | TKO | 4 (6) | 22 Oct 1999 | Legia na Bemowie Hall, Warsaw, Poland | |
| 3 | Win | 3–0 | Milko Stoikov | TKO | 3 (6) | 26 Jun 1999 | Hala Ludowa, Wrocław, Poland | |
| 2 | Win | 2–0 | Smokey Enison | TKO | 2 (4), 2:50 | 29 Apr 1999 | York Hall, London, England | |
| 1 | Win | 1–0 | Israel Khumalo | TKO | 1 (4), 2:15 | 13 Mar 1999 | Bowlers Exhibition Centre, Manchester, England | |

== Exhibition boxing record ==
| 4 fights | 4 wins | 0 losses |
|---|---|---|
| By knockout | 2 | 0 |
| By decision | 2 | 0 |

| No. | Result | Record | Opponent | Type | Round, time | Date | Location | Notes |
|---|---|---|---|---|---|---|---|---|
| 4 | Loss | 3–1 | Roberto Soldić | KO | 2 (8), 1:32 | 6 Sep 2025 | Arena Gliwice, Gliwice, Poland | |
| 3 | Win | 3–0 | Kasjusz Życiński | UD | 4 | 31 Aug 2024 | Stadion Narodowy, Warsaw, Poland | |
| 2 | Win | 2–0 | Patryk Bandurski | UD | 3 | 18 May 2024 | Arena Gliwice, Gliwice, Poland | |
| 1 | Win | 1–0 | Mamed Khalidov | TKO | 3 (6), 3:00 | 24 Feb 2024 | Arena Gliwice, Gliwice, Poland | |

== Titles in boxing ==
=== Major world titles ===
- WBC light heavyweight champion (175 lbs)
- IBF cruiserweight champion (200 lbs)

=== The Ring magazine titles ===
- The Ring cruiserweight champion (200 lbs)

=== Minor world titles ===
- IBO cruiserweight champion (200 lbs)

=== Regional/International titles ===
- Poland International light heavyweight champion (175 lbs)
- IBC Inter-Continental light heavyweight champion (175 lbs)
- CISBB light heavyweight champion (175 lbs)
- IBF Inter-Continental light heavyweight champion (175 lbs)
- WBO Inter-Continental light heavyweight champion (175 lbs)
- Poland International heavyweight champion (200+ lbs)
- NABO heavyweight champion (200+ lbs)
- IBF North American heavyweight champion (200+ lbs)
- IBF International heavyweight champion (200+ lbs)

== Viewership ==
=== Poland ===
| Date | Fight | Viewership (avg.) | Network | Source(s) |
|---|---|---|---|---|
| 24 October 2009 | Tomasz Adamek vs. Andrew Golota | 8,190,000 – 13,000,000 | Polsat | |
| | Total viewership | 8,190,000 – 13,000,000 | | |

=== United States ===
| Date | Fight | Viewership | Network | Source(s) |
|---|---|---|---|---|
| 22 December 2012 | Tomasz Adamek vs. Steve Cunningham | 3,200,000 | NBC Sports | (Note: Peak viewership) |
| | Total viewership | 3,200,000 | | |

=== Pay-per-view bouts ===
| Date | Fight | Pay-per-view buys | Country | Network | Source(s) |
|---|---|---|---|---|---|
| 10 September 2011 | Vitali Klitschko vs. Tomasz Adamek | 200,000 | Poland | Cyfra+ PPV | |
| 8 November 2014 | Tomasz Adamek vs. Artur Szpilka | 100,000 | Poland | Cyfrowy Polsat PPV | |
| | Total sales | 300,000 | | | |

== See also ==
- List of light heavyweight boxing champions
- List of cruiserweight boxing champions
- List of WBC world champions
- List of IBF world champions
- List of The Ring world champions

Sporting positions
Regional boxing titles
| Vacant Title last held by Joe Gatti | IBC Inter-Continental light heavyweight champion 2 March 2001 – October 2003; Vacated | Vacant Title next held by Prince Badi Ajamu |
| Vacant Title last held by Milorad Dukovic | CISBB light heavyweight champion 24 May 2002 – June 2002; Vacated | Vacant Title next held by Andrey Shkalikov |
| New title | Poland International light heavyweight champion 18 October 2002 – 2007; Vacated | Vacant Title next held by Grzegorz Soszyński |
| Vacant Title last held by Vadym Safonov | IBF Inter-Continental light heavyweight champion 4 October 2003 – January 2004; Vacated | Vacant Title next held by Vadym Safonov |
| Vacant Title last held by Zsolt Erdei | WBO Inter-Continental light heavyweight champion 17 April 2004 – May 2005; Vacated | Vacant Title next held by Stipe Drews |
| Vacant Title last held by Alexey Soloviev | IBF International heavyweight champion 24 October 2009 – September 2011; Vacated | Vacant Title next held by Kubrat Pulev |
| Vacant Title last held by Brian Minto | NABO heavyweight champion 24 April 2010 – August 2011; Vacated | Vacant Title next held by Amir Mansour |
| Vacant Title last held by Amir Mansour | IBF North American heavyweight champion 16 June 2012 – 15 March 2014 | Succeeded by Vyacheslav Glazkov |
| Vacant Title last held by Mike Mollo | Poland International heavyweight champion 18 November 2017 – April 2019; Vacated | Vacant Title next held by Martin Bakole |
Minor world boxing titles
| Vacant Title last held by Carl Thompson | IBO cruiserweight champion 9 June 2007 – 27 February 2009; Stripped | Vacant Title next held by Danny Green |
Major world boxing titles
| Vacant Title last held by Antonio Tarver | WBC light heavyweight champion 21 May 2005 – 3 February 2007 | Succeeded by Chad Dawson |
| Preceded by Steve Cunningham | IBF cruiserweight champion 11 December 2008 – 18 October 2009; Vacated | Vacant Title next held by Steve Cunningham |
| Vacant Title last held by David Haye | The Ring cruiserweight champion 11 December 2008 – 10 February 2010; Vacated | Vacant Title next held by Yoan Pablo Hernández |
