= Chris Arreola =

American boxer (born 1981)

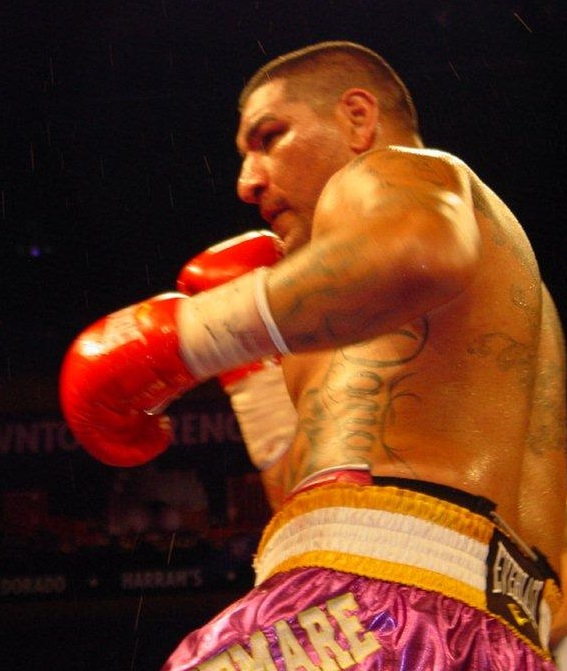
- Arreola in 2011

Personal information
- Nickname: The Nightmare
- Born: Cristobal Arreola; March 5, 1981 (age 45) Los Angeles, California, U.S.
- Height: 6 ft 3 in (191 cm)
- Weight: Heavyweight

Boxing career
- Reach: 76 in (193 cm)
- Stance: Orthodox

Boxing record
- Total fights: 49
- Wins: 39
- Win by KO: 34
- Losses: 7
- Draws: 1
- No contests: 2

Cristobal Arreola (born March 5, 1981) is an American former professional boxer who competed from 2003 to 2023. He challenged three times for the WBC heavyweight title in 2009, 2014 and 2016. He was ranked by BoxRec as the world's No.8 heavyweight at the conclusion of 2007 and as No.7 heavyweight from 2008 to 2010.

== Early life ==
Arreola was born in Los Angeles, California. As a child he met boxer Julio César Chávez a couple of times. Arreola said of it "I had a chance to go to his house in Culiacán because my father was from near there and my aunt lived in Culiacan. I used to go and watch him train.".

== Amateur career ==
Arreola grew up in East Los Angeles. His father was a boxer and started him boxing at the age of eight with trainer Hector Rodríguez. At 16, he had "about 200 amateur bouts" before losing interest and quitting. In 2001 at 20 he got back into boxing and after only three months of training managed to win the National Golden Gloves at the Light Heavyweight division. To win, Chris beat Dallas Vargas, who had about 300 amateur fights at the time.

After another hiatus from boxing, this time for two years, he tried to come back for the 2003 Golden Gloves but arrived shortly after the check-in deadline prompting him to turn pro.

== Professional career ==
=== Early career ===
In 2003, Goossen-Tutor promoted him and turned him pro at heavyweight with little fanfare. Looking back he says: "I really didn't know if boxing was going to be my career. I wasn't sure about turning pro and once I did, I just took it one fight at a time. But then I starting knocking guys out and I gradually started thinking, 'Hey, maybe I can make some money doing this'."

In 2007, he KOd former amateur star Zakeem Graham (11–0). He was scheduled to fight undefeated Olympian Devin Vargas, brother of his amateur foe Dallas Vargas, but knocked out late sub Malcolm Tann when Vargas got injured in training, in May 2007 on ShoBox. He KO'd Thomas Hayes (record 27–0–0–0) in September 2007, in round 1.

On June 21, 2008, Arreola faced fellow undefeated prospect Chazz Witherspoon (23–0) and defeated him via disqualifaction.

On November 29, 2008, Arreola faced Travis Walker and knocked him out early in the 3rd round, improving Arreola's record to 26–0.

By June 2008, Arreola was ranked in the top 10 by all four major governing bodies.

Arreola defeated the previously retired heavyweight veteran Jameel McCline (40–8 23 KO's) on April 11, 2009, with a knockout at 2:01 of the 4th round.

=== Arreola vs. Klitschko ===
After his win, Arreola was the number one contender to challenge Vitali Klitschko for his WBC Heavyweight title belt. Arreola was happy with his draw when it was announced they would fight in Arreola's home town. The match took place on September 26, 2009, at the Staples Center in Los Angeles. It was broadcast on HBO. Arreola's corner and the referee stopped the fight before the start of the 11th round, giving Klitschko a 10th-round RTD (TKO) victory. The final scorecards read 99–91, 99–91, and 100–89, all for Klitschko.

=== Rebuild after first unsuccessful WBC title challenge ===
Soon after his first career loss, Arreola fought Brian Minto as an undercard for the Paul Williams vs. Sergio Martínez fight. Chris landed well with his straight right hand and eventually floored Minto in the 4th round; Minto got up at 8 and continued to get hit with right hands before being dropped again. The referee stopped the fight when Minto rose at 9 and appeared to be in no condition to proceed with the fight.

Arreola lost his next fight, to former two-division world champion Tomasz Adamek, by majority decision on 24 April 2010. Arreola was again looking out of shape for a professional boxer at the time of the fight.

Arreola in his next fight defeated Manuel Quezada in Ontario, California by a 12-round unanimous decision. Quezada was down three times in the fight: twice in the 9th round and once in the 12th. The scores (117–108) and two judges had it (118–107). Before the fight Arreola had an interview on ESPN saying that his last two defeats were because he did not train well (as well as skipping days) and stepped into the training camp weighing nearly 300 pounds. He said that he now knew how to prepare for a fight, and realizes he needs to take the training camp seriously. He came in at 256 pounds (he fought the best at 230–240, and lost his previous two weighing over 250 pounds) and fought sluggishly against a tough opponent. At the end of the fight, Arreola said he gave himself a C− for overall performance.

After his knockout over American Joey Abell on ESPN, Arreola took out title contender Nagy Aguilera in the third round. This bout was televised on Showtime's Andre Ward vs. Arthur Abraham undercard. Thirteen days after the fight with Aguilera, Cristobal knocked out tough veteran Kendrick Releford in the seventh round, as the main-event on ESPN. He has since then won by a 10-round unanimous decision against Friday Ahunanya on July 9, and a third-round TKO over Raphael Butler on November 5, 2011, in Guanajuato Domo De La Feria, Leon, Guanajuato, Mexico.

Arreola's next fight was on the Paul Williams vs. Nobuhiro Ishida undercard at the American Bank Center, Corpus Christi, Texas, on February 18, 2012. The opponent was heavyweight contender Éric Molina. Arreola won the fight by first-round KO. After the knockout, Arreola created some stir in the post fight interview when he referred to Molina's promoter Don King as a "f—ing a–hole and a racist," prompting Showtime's Jim Gray to immediately terminate the interview. "Honestly Don King called me a wetback, and other Mexicans," Arreola told Fightnews.com. "That's a strong word. It's like me dropping N bombs. You don't say things like that."

=== Arreola vs. Stiverne I and II ===
Arreola had a chance at a rematch with Vitali Klitschko in April 2013 when he faced Bermane Stiverne. Although a favorite to win the fight, Arreola was knocked down in the third round and wound up losing a unanimous decision.

On September 7, 2013, Arreola beat Seth Mitchell in a single round.

After Klitschko vacated the title in December 2013, Arreola was signed to fight Bermane Stiverne for the vacant title. On May 10, 2014, Stiverne won the title after a sixth-round knockout.

=== Rebuild after second unsuccessful WBC title challenge ===
On March 13, 2015, Arreola made his return to the ring to face heavyweight Curtis Harper. The fight took place during the first Premier Boxing Champions on Spike TV broadcast at the Citizens Business Bank Arena in Ontario, CA. Arreola was awarded a victory by unanimous decision following 8 rounds of boxing.

On July 18, 2015, Arreola fought to a ten-round draw with Fred Kassi. The scores were 96–94 for Arreola, 95–95 on the remaining two cards.

Arreola's tight 12-round split decision victory over Travis Kauffman on Dec. 12 at the AT&T Center in San Antonio was changed to a no-decision on Jan. 5, after Arreola tested positive for marijuana.

=== Arreola vs. Wilder ===
Arreola made his third challenge for the WBC heavyweight title when he travelled to Birmingham, Alabama on July 16, 2016, to face WBC champion Deontay Wilder. Wilder eventually won by 8th round retirement to retain his title.

=== Arreola vs. Kownacki ===
After two consecutive wins following his loss to Deontay Wilder, Arreola faced the unbeaten Adam Kownacki in a thrilling fight on August 3, 2019. The two men put on a record-breaking heavyweight display at the Barclays Center, New York, combining to throw over 2100 punches over 12 rounds. Kownacki won a unanimous decision to give Arreola his sixth career loss, with scores of 118–110, 117–111, 117–111.

=== Arreola vs. Ruiz Jr. ===
Following Arreola's loss to Adam Kownacki, he next returned to the ring over a year later on May 1, 2021 to face former unified heavyweight champion Andy Ruiz Jr. on Fox PPV. Ruiz Jr was ranked #6 by The Ring, #4 by the WBC and #5 by the WBA and WBO. Arreola started well and scored a second round knockdown, but ultimately lost a unanimous decision, with scores of 117–110, 118–109, 118–109.

Arreola was very unhappy with the judges' scorecards, which he expressed in his post-fight interview: "Did he [Ruiz] win? Fine. But don't tell me you're only going to give me two or three rounds. Fuck that! I'm gonna be like Dr. Dre, all y'all can suck my motherfuckin' dick!" In the post-fight press conference, he proceeded to repeat his displeasure with the judges: "These motherfuckers just straight up like fucking raped me, and don't even kiss me dude, that's some fucked up ass shit."

== Professional boxing record ==
49 fights	39 wins	7 losses
By knockout	34	3
By decision	3	4
By disqualification	2	0
Draws	1	
No contests	2	

No.	Result	Record	Opponent	Type	Round, time	Date	Location	Notes
49	Win	39–7–1 (2)	Matthew McKinney	KO	2 (8), 1:01	Apr 8, 2023	Dignity Health Sports Park, Carson, California, U.S.	
48	Loss	38–7–1 (2)	Andy Ruiz Jr.	UD	12	May 1, 2021	Dignity Health Sports Park, Carson, California, U.S.	
47	Loss	38–6–1 (2)	Adam Kownacki	UD	12	Aug 3, 2019	Barclays Center, New York City, New York, U.S.	
46	Win	38–5–1 (2)	Jean-Pierre Augustin	TKO	3 (10), 2:03	Mar 16, 2019	AT&T Stadium, Arlington, Texas, U.S.	
45	Win	37–5–1 (2)	Maurenzo Smith	RTD	6 (8), 3:00	Dec 1, 2018	Staples Center, Los Angeles, California, U.S.	
44	Loss	36–5–1 (2)	Deontay Wilder	RTD	8 (12), 3:00	Jul 16, 2016	Legacy Arena, Birmingham, Alabama, U.S.	For WBC heavyweight title
43	NC	36–4–1 (2)	Travis Kauffman	SD	12	Dec 12, 2015	AT&T Center, San Antonio, Texas, U.S.	Originally an SD win for Arreola, later ruled an NC after he failed a drug test
42	Draw	36–4–1 (1)	Fred Kassi	MD	10	Jul 18, 2015	Don Haskins Center, El Paso, Texas, U.S.	
41	Win	36–4 (1)	Curtis Harper	UD	8	Mar 13, 2015	Citizens Business Bank Arena, Ontario, California, U.S.	
40	Loss	35–4 (1)	Bermane Stiverne	TKO	6 (12), 2:02	May 10, 2014	Galen Center, Los Angeles, California, U.S.	For vacant WBC heavyweight title
39	Win	35–3 (1)	Seth Mitchell	KO	1 (12), 2:26	Sep 7, 2013	Fantasy Springs Resort Casino, Indio, California, U.S.	Won WBC International heavyweight title
38	Loss	34–3 (1)	Bermane Stiverne	UD	12	Apr 27, 2013	Citizens Business Bank Arena, Ontario, California, U.S.	For WBC Silver heavyweight title
37	Win	34–2 (1)	Éric Molina	KO	1 (12), 2:30	Feb 18, 2012	American Bank Center, Corpus Christi, Texas, U.S.	Won WBC–USNBC heavyweight title
36	Win	33–2 (1)	Raphael Butler	TKO	3 (10), 0:55	Nov 5, 2011	Domo de la Feria, León, Mexico	
35	NC	32–2 (1)	Friday Ahunanya	UD	10	Jul 9, 2011	Boardwalk Hall, Atlantic City, New Jersey, U.S.	Originally a UD win for Arreola, later ruled an NC after he failed a drug test
34	Win	32–2	Kendrick Releford	TKO	7 (10), 2:43	May 27, 2011	Events Center, Reno, Nevada, U.S.	
33	Win	31–2	Nagy Aguilera	TKO	3 (10), 1:58	May 14, 2011	Home Depot Center, Carson, California, U.S.	
32	Win	30–2	Joey Abell	TKO	1 (10), 2:18	Jan 28, 2011	Pechanga Resort & Casino, Temecula, California, U.S.	
31	Win	29–2	Manuel Quezada	UD	12	Aug 13, 2010	Citizens Business Bank Arena, Ontario, California, U.S.	Won WBC FECOMBOX heavyweight title
30	Loss	28–2	Tomasz Adamek	MD	12	Apr 24, 2010	Citizens Business Bank Arena, Ontario, California, U.S.	For IBF International and vacant WBO–NABO heavyweight titles
29	Win	28–1	Brian Minto	TKO	4 (10), 2:40	Dec 5, 2009	Boardwalk Hall, Atlantic City, New Jersey, U.S.	
28	Loss	27–1	Vitali Klitschko	RTD	10 (12), 3:00	Sep 26, 2009	Staples Center, Los Angeles, California, U.S.	For WBC heavyweight title
27	Win	27–0	Jameel McCline	KO	4 (12), 2:01	Apr 11, 2009	Mandalay Bay Events Center, Paradise, Nevada, U.S.	Retained WBC Continental Americas and NABF heavyweight titles
26	Win	26–0	Travis Walker	TKO	3 (12), 0:13	Nov 29, 2008	Citizens Business Bank Arena, Ontario, California, U.S.	Retained WBC Continental Americas heavyweight title; Won NABF heavyweight title
25	Win	25–0	Israel Garcia	TKO	3 (10), 1:11	Sep 25, 2008	Soboba Casino, San Jacinto, California, U.S.	Retained WBC Continental Americas heavyweight title
24	Win	24–0	Chazz Witherspoon	DQ	3 (12), 3:00	Jun 21, 2008	FedExForum, Memphis, Tennessee, U.S.	Retained WBC Continental Americas heavyweight title; Witherspoon disqualified after his cornermen entered the ring too early
23	Win	23–0	Cliff Couser	TKO	1 (10), 1:22	Feb 9, 2008	Pechanga Resort & Casino, Temecula, California, U.S.	
22	Win	22–0	Thomas Hayes	KO	3 (10), 1:45	Sep 21, 2007	DoubleTree, Ontario, California, U.S.	Won vacant WBC Continental Americas heavyweight title
21	Win	21–0	Derek Berry	KO	1 (10), 0:57	Jul 14, 2007	Home Depot Center, Carson, California, U.S.	
20	Win	20–0	Malcolm Tann	TKO	8 (8), 1:07	May 4, 2007	Pearl Concert Theater, Paradise, Nevada, U.S.	
19	Win	19–0	Zakeem Graham	TKO	3 (10), 2:42	Feb 9, 2007	Suffolk County Community College, Brookhaven, New York, U.S.	
18	Win	18–0	Damian Wills	TKO	7 (10), 2:17	Nov 4, 2006	Mandalay Bay Events Center, Paradise, Nevada, U.S.	
17	Win	17–0	Damian Norris	TKO	4 (8), 2:59	Aug 19, 2006	Events Center, Reno, Nevada, U.S.	
16	Win	16–0	Sedreck Fields	KO	7 (8), 1:41	May 25, 2006	Pechanga Resort & Casino, Temecula, California, U.S.	
15	Win	15–0	Manuel Ossie	KO	1 (6), 1:33	Apr 12, 2006	Tachi Palace Hotel & Casino, Lemoore, California, U.S.	
14	Win	14–0	Curtis Taylor	KO	1 (6), 2:28	Mar 3, 2006	Pechanga Resort & Casino, Temecula, California, U.S.	
13	Win	13–0	Domonic Jenkins	TKO	5 (8), 2:38	Oct 21, 2005	Pechanga Resort & Casino, Temecula, California, U.S.	
12	Win	12–0	Andrew Greeley	UD	6	Sep 23, 2005	USC Lyon Center, Los Angeles, California, U.S.	
11	Win	11–0	Kenny Lemos	TKO	4 (4), 1:49	May 5, 2005	Spa Resort Casino, Palm Springs, California, U.S.	
10	Win	10–0	Samuel Rodríguez	TKO	4 (6), 1:26	Feb 17, 2005	Avalon, Hollywood, California, U.S.	
9	Win	9–0	David Cleage	DQ	3 (4)	Jan 21, 2005	Mohegan Sun Arena, Montville, Connecticut, U.S.	Cleage disqualified for repeated fouls
8	Win	8–0	Benjamin García	TKO	1 (6), 0:21	Dec 9, 2004	Pechanga Resort & Casino, Temecula, California, U.S.	
7	Win	7–0	Ed Mosley	TKO	1 (4), 0:59	Dec 20, 2004	Omega International, Corona, California, U.S.	
6	Win	6–0	David Johnson	TKO	1 (4)	Apr 26, 2004	DoubleTree, Ontario, California, U.S.	
5	Win	5–0	Jason Condon	KO	1 (4), 2:33	Mar 22, 2004	DoubleTree, Ontario, California, U.S.	
4	Win	4–0	Semisi Bloomfield	TKO	1 (4), 2:40	Feb 16, 2004	DoubleTree, Ontario, California, U.S.	
3	Win	3–0	David Johnson	KO	2 (4), 1:21	Nov 10, 2003	DoubleTree, Ontario, California, U.S.	
2	Win	2–0	Jeremiah Constant	TKO	1 (4), 0:27	Oct 3, 2003	Edgewater Hotel and Casino, Laughlin, Nevada, U.S.	
1	Win	1–0	Roosevelt Parker	TKO	2 (4), 1:25	Sep 5, 2003	Edgewater Hotel and Casino, Laughlin, Nevada, U.S.	

Sporting positions
Amateur boxing titles
Previous: Arthur Palac	U.S. Golden Gloves light heavyweight champion 2001	Next: Allan Green
Regional boxing titles
Vacant Title last held by Tony Thompson	WBC Continental Americas heavyweight champion September 21, 2007 – September 26, 2009; Failed to win world title	Vacant Title next held by Chauncy Welliver
Preceded by Travis Walker	NABF heavyweight champion November 29, 2008 – September 2009; Vacated	Vacant Title next held by Johnathon Banks
Vacant Title last held by Humberto Soto	WBC FECOMBOX heavyweight champion August 13, 2010 – June 2011; Vacated	Vacant Title next held by David Rodriguez
Preceded by Éric Molina	WBC–USNBC heavyweight champion February 18, 2012 – September 2012; Vacated	Vacant Title next held by Magomed Abdusalamov
Vacant Title last held by Seth Mitchell	WBC International heavyweight champion September 7, 2013 – March 2014; Vacated	Vacant Title next held by Tony Thompson
