= Butler BlueSox =

- Logo

Information
- League: Tri-State Collegiate League (2020-2024); Rust Belt League (2023-2024)
- Location: Natrona Heights, Pennsylvania
- Ballpark: Highlands High School Field, Natrona Heights, Pennsylvania (2025–Present)
- Founded: 2006
- Former name: Washington BlueSox (2006–2008)
- Former league: Prospect League (2009-2018)
- Former ballparks: CONSOL Energy Park (Washington) (2006–2008); Ross Memorial Park and Alexandre Stadium (Washington) (2006–2008)
- Colors: Navy Blue, White
- Mascot: Babe The BlueSox Ox
- Ownership: 'Wink' Robinson; Larry Sassone; Matt Clement; Roger Snodgrass; Dr. Mike Fiorina; Gordon Marburger (2018) (2019) - City of Butler Parks, Recreation Grounds and Facilities Authority
- Management: City of Butler Parks, Recreation Grounds and Facilities Authority
- Manager: Dan Helgert
- Website: butlerbluesox.net

The Butler BlueSox were a collegiate summer baseball team based in Butler, Pennsylvania, in the United States. They were members of the Tri-State Collegiate League and formerly a member of the East Division of the summer collegiate Prospect League. The team will play its 2025 season at Highlands High School Field in Natrona Heights, Pennsylvania. New named to be announced soon.

== History ==
The BlueSox were formed by former Pennsylvania State Representative Leo Trich, Jr. in Washington, Pennsylvania in 2006 as part of the Tri-State Collegiate Baseball League. After renovations were completed at Kelly Automotive Park in 2008, Trich decided to move the Washington BlueSox to Butler as a founding member of the Prospect League. The team officially became part of the league in December 2008. The team went 28(W)-26(L) during their 2009 inaugural season in Butler. In 2011 Leo Trich sold his ownership of the team to a group of five local business partners to run the team. MLB pitcher, and Butler native Matt Clement is one of the owners. In late 2011, an agreement was reached to keep the BlueSox in Butler through the 2013 season.

=== 2012 season ===
For the 2012 season, four additional games were added to the 56 game schedule. The BlueSox went on to have a winning season for the first time since their inaugural year in the Prospect League, three years before. However, they were a few games short of making the playoffs.

=== 2013 season ===
The 2013 season consisted of thirty home games. The BlueSox hosted the Prospect League All-Star Game on July 17, 2013. The team was eliminated from the playoffs during the last game of the regular season, falling to the Slippery Rock Sliders 4–0.

=== 2014 season ===
The BlueSox made their first playoff appearance in 2014 by going 25–7 in the second half of the season which included an 11-game win streak. They were eliminated by the Chillicothe Paints in the East Division Playoff 2–0 in the best of three series. BlueSox pitcher Adam Bleday (University of Virginia) was named Prospect League LHP of the year.

=== 2015 season ===
Former BlueSox player and assistant coach Jason Radwan took over as the manager and guided Butler to a 33–27 record. First baseman David Marcus (California University of Pennsylvania) won both the Mike Schmidt Player of the Year and Roland Hemond top pro prospect awards. Marcus had a league best 11 home runs and 49 RBI. He finished fourth in the Prospect League batting title race with a .363 average.

=== 2016 season ===
For only the third time in team history and the first time since 2011, Butler (29–31) finished with a sub .500 record. The BlueSox ended the season on a four-game winning streak including a sweep of Champion City in a double-header at home on the final day of the season, which eliminated the Kings from making the postseason. Outfielder Will Schneider (Morehead State) was a mid-season and postseason All-Star. Schneider had a .335 batting average with Butler, good for fourth-best in the Prospect League. BlueSox pitcher Connor Coward (Virginia Tech) tallied 68 strikeouts, which tied for second in the league.

=== 2017 season ===
Under first-year manager Cody Herald, a Butler native and former BlueSox player, the BlueSox had a record-setting season, winning their first-ever postseason series when they swept the West Virginia Miners, 2–0. They also advanced to the Prospect League Championship Series for the first time where they lost to the Lafayette Aviators, 2–1. Third baseman James Meeker (Delaware), shortstop Pavin Parks (Kent State), outfielder Tanner Murphy (North Florida), catcher Brady Gulakowski (NC State) and pitcher Connor Coward (Virginia Tech) were named to the Prospect League East Division Postseason All-Star Team.

=== 2019 season ===
The team announced in August 2018 that it would not participate in the 2019 Prospect League season.

2020 season

On January 26, 2020, the BlueSox's Facebook page posted that the BlueSox would return to play in the Tri-State Collegiate League. The team would play their first game back against the Youngstown Creekside Crocodiles on June 10, where they lost 7-6.

=== 2022 Season ===
In 2022 the BlueSox made the Tri-State Collegiate League Playoffs, and advanced all the way to the Championship where they finished as runners-up. They were defeated 7–6 by the Creekside Crocodiles.

=== 2023 Season ===
For the start of the season the BlueSox will join the newly formed Rust Belt League within the Tri-State Collegiate League. They will be joined by the 3B Barons, East Butler Bulldogs, and Meadville Mustangs.

=== Notable alumni ===
- Jacke Healey (2009)
- Kevan Smith (2010)
- Derek West (2017)
- David Bednar (baseball) (2014) MLB All-Star. Former closer for the Pittsburgh Pirates

== Seasons ==
Year	W-L	PCT	Place	Postseason
2009	28–26	.521	3rd in PL East	
2010	24–30	.444	3rd in PL East	
2011	25–29	.463	6th in PL East	
2012	32–26	.552	4th in PL East	
2013	33–26	.559	3rd in PL East	
2014	40–20	.667	T-1st in PL East	Lost 1st Round Playoff vs. Chillicothe Paints 2–0.
2015	33–27	.550	3rd in PL East	
2016	29–31	.483	4th in PL East	
2017	37–23	.617	1st in PL East	Won 1st Round Playoff vs. West Virginia Miners 2–0, Lost PL Championship vs. Lafayette Aviators 2–1.
2018	21–39	.350	5th in PL East	
2022				Runners Up in Championship vs. Creekside Crocodiles.
Total	302–277	.521	-	

== Sources ==
- Schnur, Richard Eugene, Men of Summer Return, Mechling Bookbindery., 2010.
