= Chad Van Sickle =

American boxer

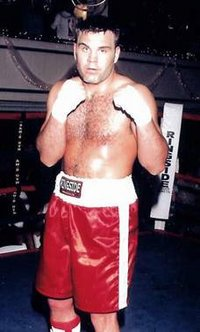

Personal information
- Born: August 23, 1977 (age 49) Columbus, Ohio, U.S.
- Height: 1.88 m (6 ft 2 in)
- Weight: Heavyweight

Boxing career
- Stance: Orthodox

Boxing record
- Total fights: 35
- Wins: 23
- Win by KO: 12
- Losses: 9
- Draws: 3
- No contests: 0

Chad Van Sickle (born August 23, 1977) is an American professional boxer. He is a former NABA Cruiserweight Champion and former WBC Americas Champion. His manager is Scott Walisa, and he is trained by his father Bob Van Sickle.

Van Sickle was born in Columbus and began boxing at a teenager, being trained by his father Rob Van Sickle and 1984 Olympic Gold Medalist Jerry Page.

Van Sickle did run a boxing gym in Columbus, Ohio, which is called Team VanSickle 12 Round Boxing. This gym opened up after he ran a gym at the Westland Mall (Columbus) with another professional boxer named Leo Martinez. He now trains fighters at Skrap House MMA in Grove City, Ohio, just south of Columbus, Ohio.

== Professional boxing record ==
35 fights	23 wins	9 losses
By knockout	12	4
By decision	11	5
Draws	3	

No.	Result	Record	Opponent	Type	Round, time	Date	Location	Notes
35	Win	23–9–3	Deandre McCole	MD	4	Mar 24, 2012	El Hasa Shrine Temple, Ashland, Kentucky, U.S.	
34	Loss	22–9–3	Odlanier Solís	TKO	1 (8), 1:32	Sep 12, 2008	Kugelbake Halle, Cuxhaven, Germany	
33	Loss	22–8–3	Brian Minto	RTD	1 (12), 3:00	Apr 27, 2008	Mountaineer Casino, Racetrack and Resort, Chester, West Virginia, U.S.	For WBA Fedecentro heavyweight title
32	Win	22–7–3	Carlton Johnson	SD	6	Dec 30, 2007	Mountaineer Casino, Racetrack and Resort, Chester, West Virginia, U.S.	
31	Loss	21–7–3	Chris Koval	SD	6	Aug 23, 2007	Mountaineer Casino, Racetrack and Resort, Chester, West Virginia, U.S.	
30	Loss	21–6–3	Chauncy Welliver	SD	10	Mar 8, 2007	Coeur d'Alene Casino, Worley, Idaho, U.S.	
29	Loss	21–5–3	Jean-François Bergeron	TKO	4 (8), 2:50	Jan 26, 2007	Bell Centre, Montreal, Canada	
28	Loss	21–4–3	Alexander Dimitrenko	TKO	2 (12), 2:21	Jul 29, 2006	König Pilsener Arena, Oberhausen, Germany	For WBO Inter-Continental heavyweight title
27	Draw	21–3–3	Chauncy Welliver	MD	10	Jun 10, 2006	Lucky Eagle Casino, Rochester, Washington, U.S.	For vacant NWBA heavyweight title
26	Win	21–3–2	Zack Page	MD	8	Mar 18, 2006	Lausche Building, Columbus, Ohio, U.S.	
25	Loss	20–3–2	Michael Alexander	UD	8	Jan 20, 2006	Voinovich Center, Columbus, Ohio, U.S.	
24	Loss	20–2–2	Shaun George	UD	10	11 Nov 2005	Washington, D.C., U.S.	Lost WBA-NABA cruiserweight title; For IBC Americas cruiserweight title
23	Win	20–1–2	Jeff Yeoman	KO	3 (10) 0:26	Oct 1, 2005	Nationwide Arena, Columbus, Ohio, U.S.	Retained WBA-NABA cruiserweight title
22	Win	19–1–2	Aaron Jaco	TKO	8 (10)	Jun 25, 2005	Nationwide Arena, Columbus, Ohio, U.S.	Won vacant WBA-NABA cruiserweight title
21	Loss	18–1–2	Gary Gomez	MD	10	Dec 4, 2004	Emerald Queen Casino, Tacoma, Washington, U.S.	Lost WBC Continental Americas cruiserweight title
20	Win	18–0–2	Luke Munsen	UD	10	Jul 30, 2004	Emerald Queen Casino, Tacoma, Washington, U.S.	Won vacant WBC Continental Americas cruiserweight title
19	Win	17–0–2	Michael Shanks	KO	1 (8), 2:34	May 15, 2004	Emerald Queen Casino, Tacoma, Washington, U.S.	
18	Win	16–0–2	Vinson Durham	TKO	8 (8), 3:00	Apr 3, 2004	Emerald Queen Casino, Tacoma, Washington, U.S.	
17	Win	15–0–2	Jonathan Williams	TKO	1 (6), 1:43	Feb 28, 2004	Emerald Queen Casino, Tacoma, Washington, U.S.	
16	Win	14–0–2	James Brock	TKO	2 (4), 1:33	Jan 9, 2004	Emerald Queen Casino, Tacoma, Washington, U.S.	
15	Win	13–0–2	Billy Douglas	UD	6	Jul 19, 2003	Franklin City Fair, Hilliard, Ohio, U.S.	
14	Win	12–0–2	Clint Calkins	TKO	1 (6) 2:18	Apr 18, 2003	Valley Dale Ballroom, Columbus, Ohio, U.S.	
13	Win	11–0–2	Joshua Jones	UD	6	Feb 14, 2003	Louisville Gardens, Louisville, Kentucky, U.S.	
12	Win	10–0–2	Sam Hawkins	UD	6	Nov 22, 2002	PromoWest Pavilion, Columbus, Ohio, U.S.	
11	Win	9–0–2	Maritito Parker	UD	4	Oct 19, 2002	Beulah Park Race Track, Grove City, Ohio, U.S.	
10	Win	8–0–2	John Moore	UD	4	Aug 30, 2002	Makoy Center, Hilliard, Ohio, U.S.	
9	Win	7–0–2	Rod Bensonhaver	UD	6	Feb 22, 2002	Schottenstein Center, Columbus, Ohio, U.S.	
8	Win	6–0–2	Leroy Loscar	TKO	3 (6), 1:59	Dec 1, 2001	Beulah Park Race Track, Grove City, Ohio, U.S.	
7	Win	5–0–2	Tyrone Mack	TKO	3 (?)	Apr 7, 2001	Huntington, West Virginia, U.S.	
6	Draw	4–0–2	Jeremy Bates	PTS	4	Mar 1, 2001	Cadillac Ranch, Lexington, Kentucky, U.S.	
5	Win	4–0–1	Myron Berryman	TKO	1 (?)	Nov 2, 2000	Ohio, U.S.	
4	Win	3–0–1	Mike Sheppard	TKO	2 (?)	Sep 16, 2000	Huntington, West Virginia, U.S.	
3	Win	2–0–1	Steve Daher	TKO	2 (?)	Jan 19, 2000	Soaring Eagle Casino, Mount Pleasant, Michigan, U.S.	
2	Draw	1–0–1	Mike Sheppard	PTS	4	Oct 14, 1999	Club Dance, Columbus, Ohio, U.S.	
1	Win	1–0	Pete Wajda	PTS	4	Apr 23, 1999	Pickaway County Fairgrounds, Circleville, Ohio, U.S.	
