= Donnell Holmes =

American boxer

Personal information
- Nickname: The Real Touch of Sleep
- Born: January 3, 1973 (age 53) Ivanhoe, North Carolina, U.S.
- Weight: Heavyweight

Boxing career
- Stance: Orthodox

Boxing record
- Total fights: 37
- Wins: 33
- Win by KO: 29
- Losses: 2
- Draws: 2
- No contests: 0

Donnell Holmes (born January 3, 1973) is an American former professional boxer who competed from 2003 to 2012.

== Career ==
Holmes had an amateur record of 73-13 (64 KOs) before turning professional in January 2003, winning his first fight at The Hilton in Wilmington, North Carolina in which Holmes beat fellow American fighter Johan Carrington.

He was promoted by Gary Shaw after leaving Don King.

He fought Brian Minto for the interim WBO NABO Heavyweight Title and Minto's WBA Fedecentro Heavyweight Title on August 14, 2009 in which he lost by a technical decision after the fight was stopped after four rounds all the judges had Minto leading so Minto was declared the winner and it was also the first loss of Holmes career.
