= Manuel Quezada =

American boxer

Personal information
- Nickname: El Toro ("The Bull")
- Nationality: American
- Born: October 13, 1977 (age 48) Wasco, California, U.S.
- Height: 6 ft 2 in (188 cm)
- Weight: Heavyweight

Boxing career
- Reach: 76 in (193 cm)
- Stance: Orthodox

Boxing record
- Total fights: 34
- Wins: 29
- Win by KO: 18
- Losses: 5

Manuel Quezada (born October 13, 1977) is an American professional boxer and former kickboxer. In boxing he fights at heavyweight, while in kickboxing he fought at both heavyweight and super heavyweight.

== Amateur Kickboxing career ==
Quezada won the IKF Amateur International Rules United States Amateur Heavyweight Title on March 14, 1998 in Bakersfield, California when he defeated Jason Williamson by first-round KO. Six months later, he became the IKF Amateur International Rules California Super Heavyweight Champion on September 12, 1998 in Bakersfield when he defeated Carter Williams of Modesto, CA by TKO.

On April 24, 1999, Friant, CA, USA, he was defeated by Carter Williams of Modesto, CA, by "Inhalant Disqualification" when it was discovered by the California Athletic Commission Rep, Dean Lohuis, that Carter's trainer had ammonia on his wipe rag during the first round break. Quezada was leading on all 3 judges cards after a first round knockdown of Williams, 10–8.

The title was retired/stripped by the IKF when Quezada demanded to be paid to defend on an event promoted by Abe Belardo in Bakersfield in June 2001. His challenger was Carter Williams, the same fighter he defeated to win the title 3 years earlier. This time though Williams was 40+ lbs bigger.

Quezada's last kickboxing bout was on December 11, 1999 and ended with an Amateur Kickboxing record of 8–3 with 4 wins by KO/TKO.

Quezada won the IKF West Coast Super Heavyweight Title on February 20, 1999 in Bakersfield, California when he defeated Dewey Cooper of Las Vegas by a unanimous decision 48–47, 49–46 and 49–46 Quezada turned Pro as a boxer in August 2001 which vacated his Amateur title.

== Boxing career ==
In September 2007 he won the WBC CABOFE (Caribbean Boxing Federation) heavyweight title.

Quezada was set to compete in an eight-man 95 kg/209 lb "Road to Glory" kickboxing tournament, a qualifier for the Glory promotion, in Tulsa, Oklahoma on February 1, 2013. However, he pulled out and was replaced by Dustin Jacoby who went on to win the tournament.

He lost to Tony Lopez via unanimous decision in the semi-finals of a four-man tournament at WCK Muay Thai: Beauty and the Beast in Lemoore, California on May 1, 2014.

== Professional record ==
29 Wins (18 knockouts), 10 Losses, 0 Draw
Res.	Record	Opponent	Type	Rd., Time	Date	Location	Notes
Loss	29–10	(Poland) Artur Szpilka	TKO	3 (10)	June 12, 2015	(United States) UIC Pavilion, Chicago, Illinois	
Loss	29–9	(United States) Andy Ruiz Jr.	TKO	2 (10)	May 17, 2014	(United States) Selland Arena, Fresno, California	
Loss	29–8	(United States) Steve Cunningham	UD	8	December 14, 2013	(United States) Resorts International, Atlantic City, New Jersey	
Loss	29–7	(Australia) Bowie Tupou	KO	7 (10)	May 14, 2011	(United States) Home Depot Center, Carson, California	
Loss	29–6	(United States) Cristobal Arreola	UD	12 (12)	August 13, 2010	(United States) Citizens Business Bank Arena, Ontario, California	Vacant WBC FECOMBOX Heavyweight Title
Loss	29–5	(United States) Jason Gavern	SD	10 (10)	April 8, 2010	(United States) Tachi Palace Hotel & Casino, Lemoore, California	WBC CABOFE Heavyweight Title
Win	29–4	(United States) Nicolai Firtha	UD	10 (10)	October 22, 2009	(United States) Tachi Palace Hotel & Casino, Lemoore, California	WBC CABOFE Heavyweight Title
Win	28–4	(United States) Travis Walker	KO	1 (12)	July 16, 2009	(United States) Tachi Palace Hotel & Casino, Lemoore, California	WBC CABOFE Heavyweight Title
Win	27–4	(United States) Jeffrey Brownfield	TKO	1 (8)	April 23, 2009	(United States) Tachi Palace Hotel & Casino, Lemoore, California	
Win	26–4	(United States) Eric Boose	TKO	5 (10)	February 6, 2009	(United States) Tachi Palace Hotel & Casino, Lemoore, California	WBC CABOFE Heavyweight Title
Win	25–4	(United States) Teke Oruh	UD	10 (10)	November 29, 2008	(United States) Citizens Business Bank Arena, Ontario, California	
Win	24–4	(United States) Andrew Greeley	UD	10 (10)	August 21, 2008	(United States) Tachi Palace Hotel & Casino, Lemoore, California	WBC CABOFE Heavyweight Title
