= Thomas Hayes (boxer) =

American boxer (1981–2025)

Personal information
- Nickname: K.O. Time
- Nationality: American
- Born: March 16, 1981 Chicago, Illinois, U.S.
- Died: March 13, 2025 (aged 43) Chicago, Illinois, U.S.
- Height: 5 ft 11 in (180 cm)
- Weight: Heavyweight

Boxing career
- Reach: 72 in (183 cm)
- Stance: Orthodox

Boxing record
- Total fights: 29
- Wins: 27
- Win by KO: 18
- Losses: 2
- Draws: 0
- No contests: 0

Thomas Hayes (March 16, 1981 – March 13, 2025) was an American professional boxer who competed from 2002 to 2011. Hayes died in a traffic collision in Chicago, on March 13, 2025, at the age of 43.

== Professional career ==
In September 2003, Hayes beat an undefeated Chris Koval (11-0) on an ESPN card. The bout was held at the Mountaineer Casino Racetrack and Resort in Chester, West Virginia.

On September 21, 2007 Hayes lost to undefeated Mexican-American Chris Arreola in a fight for the vacant WBC Continental Americas heavyweight title. The bout was televised on TeleFutura.

== Professional boxing record ==
29 fights	27 wins	2 losses
By knockout	18	2
By decision	9	0

Key to abbreviations used for results
DQ	Disqualification	RTD	Corner retirement
KO	Knockout	SD	Split decision / split draw
MD	Majority decision / majority draw	TD	Technical decision / technical draw
NC	No contest	TKO	Technical knockout
PTS	Points decision	UD	Unanimous decision / unanimous draw

Boxing record
No.	Result	Record	Opponent	Type	Round(s), time	Date	Location	Notes
	Win	4-20-1	(United States) Dione Craig	UD	6	15 July 2011	(United States) Royal Oak Music Theatre, Royal Oak, Michigan	
	Loss	21-0	(United States) Chris Arreola	KO	3	21 September 2007	(United States) Doubletree Hotel, Ontario, California	WBC Continental Americas Heavyweight Title. Hayes knocked out at 1:45 of the third round.
	Win	7-6	(United States) Jim Franklin	TKO	3	1 December 2006	(United States) Cicero Stadium, Cicero, Illinois	Referee stopped the bout at 1:07 of the third round.
	Win	8-5-1	(United States) Mike Sheppard	UD	6	16 June 2006	(United States) Cicero Stadium, Cicero, Illinois	
	Win	2-11	(Nicaragua) Juan Luis Gonzalez	KO	3	13 February 2006	Palacio San Jose, San Jose, Costa Rica	
	Win	1-1	(United States) Steve Pilkington	TKO	6	28 January 2006	(United States) Hedrick, Iowa	Referee stopped the bout at 1:37 of the sixth round.
	Win	11-10	(United States) Travis Fulton	TKO	3	8 July 2005	(United States) Radisson Star Plaza, Merrillville, Indiana	Referee stopped the bout at 1:33 of the third round.
	Win	9-19	(United States) Kevin Tallon	KO	2	20 April 2005	(United States) Bourbon Street, Merrionette Park, Illinois	Tallon knocked out at 1:12 of the second round.
	Win	9-18	(United States) Kevin Tallon	TKO	6	10 March 2005	(United States) Columbia Club, Indianapolis, Indiana	Referee stopped the bout at 0:01 of the sixth round.
	Win	6-6	(United States) Joe Johnson	UD	6	4 February 2005	(United States) Seminole Hard Rock Hotel and Casino Hollywood, Hollywood, Florida	
	Win	19-19-2	(United States) Ken Murphy	UD	6	19 November 2004	(United States) Radisson Star Plaza, Merrillville, Indiana	
	Win	13-158-5	(United States) Donnie Penelton	TKO	2	12 November 2004	(United States) Resch Center, Green Bay, Wisconsin	Referee stopped the bout at 2:00 of the second round.
	Win	13-22-1	(United States) Bryan Blakely	UD	4	22 October 2004	(United States) Ramada Plaza Hotel, Rosemont, Illinois	
	Win	7-29	(United States) David James Cherry	KO	3	26 August 2004	(United States) Comstock Inn, Owosso, Michigan	Cherry knocked out at 2:13 of the third round.
	Win	1-13	(United States) Brady Frost	KO	2	30 April 2004	(United States) Hammond Civic Center, Hammond, Indiana	Frost knocked out at 0:20 of the second round.
	Win	4-7	(United States) Wallace McDaniel	TKO	1	27 February 2004	(United States) The Orleans, Las Vegas, Nevada	Referee stopped the bout at 2:00 of the first round.
	Win	3-44	(United States) Donald Tucker	TKO	3	15 November 2003	(United States) Hammond Civic Center, Hammond, Indiana	Referee stopped the bout at 1:20 of the third round.
	Win	11-0	(United States) Chris Koval	TKO	1	2 September 2003	(United States) Mountaineer Casino, Racetrack and Resort, Chester, West Virginia	Referee stopped the bout at 1:14 of the first round.
	Win	0-1	(United States) Edgar Myers	TKO	1	18 July 2003	(United States) Farm Bureau Building, Indianapolis, Indiana	Referee stopped the bout at 1:24 of the first round.
	Win	0-1	(United States) Chris Boyer	TKO	1	20 June 2003	(United States) Riehle Brothers Pavilion, Lafayette, Indiana	Referee stopped the bout at 1:14 of the first round.
	Win	4-68-2	(United States) John Basil Jackson	UD	4	14 June 2003	(United States) Radisson Hotel, Merrillville, Indiana	
	Win	–	(United States) James Boyd	KO	2	6 June 2003	(United States) Farm Bureau Building, Indianapolis, Indiana	Boyd knocked out at 2:32 of the second round.
	Win	1-2	(United States) James Porter	UD	4	18 April 2003	(United States) Farm Bureau Building, Indianapolis, Indiana	
	Win	0-1	(United States) Aaron Jarvis	KO	1	10 April 2003	(United States) Riehle Brothers Pavilion, Lafayette, Indiana	Jarvis knocked out at 1:18 of the first round.
	Win	6-23	(United States) David James Cherry	UD	4	21 March 2003	(United States) DeltaPlex Arena, Grand Rapids, Michigan	
	Win	0-4	(United States) Ronald Burnett	KO	2	13 March 2003	(United States) Columbia Club, Indianapolis, Indiana	Burnett knocked out at 0:35 of the second round.
	Loss	5-23	(United States) David James Cherry	TKO	2	24 January 2003	(United States) Ramada Inn, Rosemont, Illinois	Referee stopped the bout at 2:18 of the second round.
	Win	7-18	(United States) Ron Gullette	UD	4	21 November 2002	(United States) House of Blues, Myrtle Beach, South Carolina	
	Win	0-2	(United States) Ronald Burnett	KO	1	12 October 2002	(United States) The Trap, Nashville, Tennessee	
