= Michelle Krill Field at Historic Pullman Park =

Baseball stadium in Butler, Pennsylvania, United States

Coordinates: 40.86°N 79.906°W

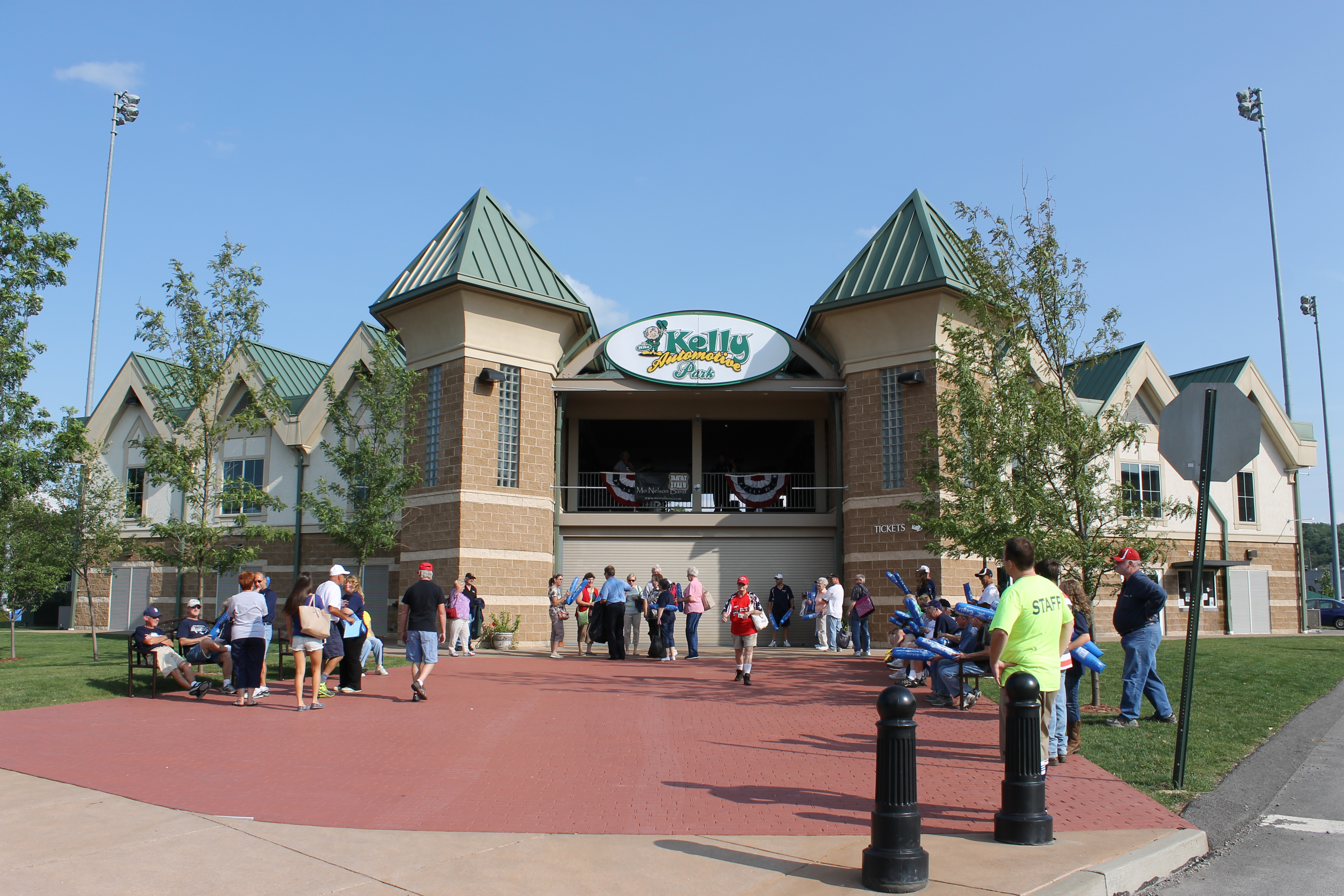
- Interactive map of Michelle Krill Field at Historic Pullman Park
- Former names: Pullman Park (1934–2008), Historic Pullman Park (2008–2014), Kelly Automotive Park (2014–2019)
- Location: Butler, Pennsylvania
- Elevation: 1,000 feet (300 m) AMSL
- Owner: City of Butler Parks, Recreation Grounds and Facilities Authority
- Operator: City of Butler Parks, Recreation Grounds and Facilities Authority
- Capacity: 1,400
- Surface: Natural and artificial turf
- Field size: Left Field – 347 feet (106 m); Left-Center – 385 feet (117 m); Deep Left-Center Field – 425 feet (130 m); Center Field – 424 feet (129 m); Right-Center – 352 feet (107 m); Right Field – 325 feet (99 m)

Construction
- Opened: 1934
- Closed: 2005–2007 (rebuilding)
- Reopened: 2008
- Cost: $5,000,000 (2008 rebuilding)
- Architect: Ligo Architects (2008 rebuilding)

Tenants
- Butler BlueSox (Prospect League) (2009–2018) (Tri-State Collegiate League) (2020-Present); Butler High School (WPIAL); Cardinal Wuerl North Catholic High School (WPIAL); Karns City High School (KSAC); Knoch High School (WPIAL); Moniteau High School (KSAC); Butler Indians (PSA) (1935); Butler Yankees (MAL) (1936–1946); Butler Tigers (MAL) (1949–1951)

Michelle Krill Field at Historic Pullman Park is a baseball stadium located in Butler, Pennsylvania. Constructed in 1934, and rebuilt in 2008, the ballpark hosted minor league teams that were affiliated with the New York Yankees, Cleveland Indians, Detroit Tigers, and the Pittsburgh Pirates.

Today, there are over 400 games played at the park. High School teams such as Karns City High School, Knoch High School, Moniteau High School, North Catholic High School as well as Butler High School utilize the ballpark during their school seasons. Local colleges and universities also use Pullman Park for some of their home games. Some of these schools include Clarion University, and Penn State Greater Allegheny. Tournaments have also been hosted by Atlantic Coast Baseball and West Penn Elite.

The stadium's official home team tenant was the Butler BlueSox of the Tri-State Collegiate League, before relocating prior to the 2025 season.

== History ==
=== 1934–2004 ===
Pullman Park opened for the 1934 season. It hosted minor league baseball from the late 1930s to the early 1950s. Notable players such as Lou Gehrig, Joe Dimaggio, and Whitey Ford played at the stadium while the Yankees farm team (Butler Yankees) was in Butler. Joe Namath, Terry Hanratty, and Rich Saul also played at Pullman during their high school years. The ballpark itself was named after the Pullman-Standard Company's railroad car manufacturing facility which sat adjacent to the ballpark from 1902-2005.

=== 2005–2008 Renovation ===
The ballpark closed after the 2004 baseball season, and sat vacant for two years while necessary funds were raised to rebuild it. Construction began in the fall of 2007, and work was completed in June 2008.

=== The New Pullman Park ===
On July 2, 2008, Pullman Park hosted a boxing match, televised on ESPN2. Butler native, Brian Minto knocked out John Poore 2:23 in the first round of the main fight. The match was the first major event to be hosted at the ballpark after the restoration and the first nationally televised event in Butler.

The following summer saw Pullman Park get its first major full-time baseball tenant in almost 60 years, the Prospect League's Butler BlueSox. The BlueSox went 28(W)-26(L) during their inaugural season at the ballpark. To date, the BlueSox have played eight full seasons at the stadium. Pullman hosted the USCAA's Small College World Series on May 6–9, 2013, and the Prospect League All-Star Game on July 17, 2013.

=== Naming Rights ===
In 2014, it was decided to help off set costs, stadium naming rights would be sold. In January 2014 the naming rights of Historic Pullman Park were sold to Kelly Automotive, a local car dealership owned by U.S. Rep Mike Kelly. Kelly Automotive Park was the first naming rights to be sold for a 5 year contract.

In January 2019, new naming rights were obtained by a local businessman Shaun Krill of Krill Recycling, naming the park Michelle Krill Field at Historic Pullman Park after his late wife, Michelle Krill.
