= Manuel Ossie =

Liberian boxer (born 1968)

Personal information
- Nickname: Destroyer
- Nationality: Liberian
- Born: Lee Manuel Ossie; July 18, 1968 (age 57) Monrovia, Liberia
- Height: 6 ft 4 in (193 cm)
- Weight: Heavyweight; Cruiserweight; Light Heavyweight

Boxing career
- Reach: 77 in (195 cm)
- Stance: Orthodox

Boxing record
- Total fights: 40
- Wins: 33
- Win by KO: 19
- Losses: 6
- Draws: 0
- No contests: 1

Lee Manuel Ossie (born July 18, 1968) is a Liberian former professional boxer. Nicknamed "Destroyer", Ossie is a former European Union light heavyweight and African heavyweight champion.

== Professional career ==
On August 26, 2005 Manuel upset title contender Adewale Abbey to win the African Boxing Union heavyweight title.

Ossie lost to undefeated American Chris Arreola. The bout was televised on ESPN.
