= Vinny Maddalone =

American boxer

Personal information
- Born: Vincent Maddalone; December 29, 1973 (age 52) Flushing, Queens, New York City, U.S.
- Height: 6 ft 2 in (188 cm)
- Weight: Heavyweight

Boxing career
- Stance: Orthodox

Boxing record
- Total fights: 47
- Wins: 37
- Win by KO: 28
- Losses: 8
- Draws: 1
- No contests: 1

Vincent "Vinny" Maddalone (born December 29, 1973) is an American retired professional boxer that competed as a heavyweight from 2002 to 2013.

== Professional career ==
Maddalone, a hard-hitting brawler, turned professional in 1999 and became a popular contender often featured on ESPN. He suffered his first loss against former world champion Al Cole, and then later fought twice against Brian Minto, coming up short in both fights.

== Recent ==
A fight against Evander Holyfield on March 17, 2007, ended in a loss by TKO when his corner threw in the towel in the third round. This defeat was followed by four wins and a lost fight against Denis Boytsov in November 2008. On April 28, 2009, he defeated Benji Baker by fourth round retirement. Thereafter he lost by unanimous decision against Jean Marc Mormeck but won his next fight against Dominique Alexander by way of technical knockout in the fifth round. On December 9, 2010, he lost fight against Tomasz Adamek who defended his IBF International Heavyweight and WBO and NABO Heavyweight Titles.

On July 7, 2012, fought Tyson Fury in Hand Arena, Clevedon, Somerset, UK for the WBO Intercontinental Title. He was beaten by ruling of TKO in the 5th round when the referee stopped the fight.

== Professional boxing record ==
47 fights	37 wins	8 losses
By knockout	28	5
By decision	8	3
By disqualification	1	0
Draws	1	
No contests	1	

Key to abbreviations used for results
DQ	Disqualification	RTD	Corner retirement
KO	Knockout	SD	Split decision / split draw
MD	Majority decision / majority draw	TD	Technical decision / technical draw
NC	No contest	TKO	Technical knockout
PTS	Points decision	UD	Unanimous decision / unanimous draw

Boxing record
No.	Result	Record	Opponent	Type	Round(s), time	Date	Location	Notes
47	Draw	37–8–1 (1)	(United States) Maurenzo Smith	MD	8	Nov 22, 2013	(United States) Paramount Theatre, Huntington, New York	
46	Win	37–8 (1)	(United States) Richard Carmack	TKO	3 (10), 2:57	May 11, 2013	(United States) Paramount Theatre, Huntington, New York	
45	Win	36–8 (1)	(United States) Byron Polley	TKO	3 (10), 1:11	Dec 8, 2012	(United States) Resorts World Casino, New York City, New York	
44	Loss	35–8 (1)	(United Kingdom) Tyson Fury	TKO	5 (12), 1:35	Jul 7, 2012	(United Kingdom) Hand Arena, Clevedon, Somerset	For WBO Intercontinental heavyweight title
43	Win	35–7 (1)	(United States) Chris Koval	TKO	4 (10), 2:34	May 2, 2012	(United States) Russo's on the Bay, New York City, New York	
42	Win	34–7 (1)	(United States) Mike Sheppard	TKO	1 (10), 1:22	Oct 22, 2011	(United States) Tropicana Hotel & Casino, Atlantic City, New Jersey	
41	Loss	33–7 (1)	(Poland) Tomasz Adamek	TKO	5 (12), 2:17	Dec 9, 2010	(United States) Prudential Center, Newark, New Jersey	For IBF International and NABO heavyweight titles
40	Win	33–6 (1)	(United States) Dominique Alexander	TKO	5 (8), 1:09	Mar 6, 2010	(United States) Tropicana Hotel & Casino, Atlantic City, New Jersey	
39	Loss	32–6 (1)	(France) Jean-Marc Mormeck	UD	8	Dec 17, 2009	(France) Halle Carpentier, Paris XIII, Paris	
38	Win	32–5 (1)	(United States) Benji Baker	RTD	4 (8), 3:00	Apr 28, 2009	(United States) Russo's on the Bay, New York City, New York	
37	Loss	31–5 (1)	(Russia) Denis Boytsov	UD	8	Nov 15, 2008	(Germany) Burg-Wächter Castello, Düsseldorf, North Rhine-Westphalia	
36	Win	31–4 (1)	(United States) Terrell Nelson	TKO	2 (8), 0:45	Nov 29, 2008	(United States) Roseland Ballroom, New York City, New York	
35	Win	30–4 (1)	(United States) Joe Stofle	TKO	1 (8), 2:47	Aug 6, 2008	(United States) B.B. King Blues Club, New York City, New York	
34	Win	29–4 (1)	(United States) Jeff Yeoman	TKO	2 (8), 2:11	Mar 6, 2008	(United States) Grand Ballroom, New York City, New York	
33	Win	28–4 (1)	(United States) Jason Barnett	DQ	7 (8), 1:48	Oct 18, 2007	(United States) Hammerstein Ballroom, New York City, New York	
32	Loss	27–4 (1)	(United States) Evander Holyfield	TKO	3 (10), 2:48	Mar 3, 2007	(United States) American Bank Center, Corpus Christi, Texas	
31	NC	27–3 (1)	(United States) Julius Long	ND	5 (8), 3:00	Dec 15, 2006	(United States) Merchant Marine Academy, Kings Point, New York	Originally a TD for Long after an unintentional head butt, changed after Long tested positive for an illegal substance
30	Win	27–3	(United States) Jermell Barnes	MD	10	Aug 18, 2006	(United States) Conference Center, Saratoga Springs, New York	
29	Win	26–3	(United States) Dan Whetzel	KO	2 (10), 1:53	Jun 9, 2006	(United States) Tropicana Hotel & Casino, Atlantic City, New Jersey	
28	Loss	25–3	(United States) Brian Minto	TKO	7 (10), 1:21	Oct 1, 2005	(United States) St. Pete Times Forum, Tampa, Florida	
27	Win	25–2	(United States) Shannon Miller	TKO	5 (10), 0:45	Aug 19, 2005	(United States) City Center, Saratoga Springs, New York	
26	Win	24–2	(United States) Dennis McKinney	TKO	4 (8), 2:06	Jun 18, 2005	(United States) FedExForum, Memphis, Tennessee	
25	Win	23–2	(United States) Troy Weida	TKO	5 (8), 1:40	Apr 9, 2005	(United States) Turning Stone Resort, Verona, New York	
24	Win	22–2	(United States) Ronnie Smith	UD	6	Dec 18, 2004	(United States) Staples Center, Los Angeles, California	
23	Loss	21–2	(United States) Brian Minto	KO	10 (10), 0:32	Jul 23, 2004	(United States) Trump Taj Mahal, Atlantic City, New Jersey	
22	Win	21–1	(United States) Joe Lenhart	TKO	5 (10), 2:34	Jun 12, 2004	Cedarbridge Academy, Devonshire, Bermuda	
21	Win	20–1	(United States) Marvin Hunt	KO	1 (8)	Nov 22, 2003	(United States) Crowne Plaza Hotel, New York City, New York	
20	Win	19–1	(United States) Dennis McKinney	SD	4	Apr 4, 2003	(United States) Mohegan Sun Casino, Uncasville, Connecticut	
19	Win	18–1	(United States) Bryan Blakely	TKO	2 (8), 0:25	Mar 14, 2003	(United States) Resorts Hotel & Casino, Atlantic City, New Jersey	
18	Win	17–1	(United States) Giles Knox	KO	2 (8)	Jan 16, 2003	(United States) House of Blues, Myrtle Beach, South Carolina	
17	Win	16–1	(United States) Edward Slater	TKO	2 (6), 1:06	Sep 28, 2002	(United States) Westin Resort, Innisbrook, Florida	
16	Loss	15–1	(United States) Al Cole	UD	6	Jun 29, 2002	(United States) Etess Arena, Atlantic City, New Jersey	
15	Win	15–0	(United States) Clarence Goins	TKO	2 (?)	Mar 3, 2002	(United States) Crown Reef Resort, Myrtle Beach, South Carolina	
14	Win	14–0	(United States) Joey Guy	TKO	2 (8)	Feb 6, 2002	(United States) Yonkers Raceway, Yonkers, New York	
13	Win	13–0	(United States) Craig Tomlinson	TKO	4 (6), 0:45	Oct 3, 2001	(United States) Yonkers Raceway, Yonkers, New York	
12	Win	12–0	(North Macedonia) Errol Sadikovski	UD	8	May 17, 2001	(United States) Roseland Ballroom, New York City, New York	
11	Win	11–0	(United States) Alejandro Torres	UD	6	Mar 14, 2001	(United States) Yonkers Raceway, Yonkers, New York	
10	Win	10–0	(United States) Mike Middleton	TKO	4 (6)	Oct 11, 2000	(United States) Yonkers Raceway, Yonkers, New York	
9	Win	9–0	(United States) Jason Gethers	TKO	2 (6)	Jun 16, 2000	(United States) IBEW Hall, Hauppauge, New York	
8	Win	8–0	(United States) Kevin Rosier	PTS	6	Mar 14, 2000	(United States) Yonkers Raceway, Yonkers, New York	
7	Win	7–0	(United States) Louis Gallucci	TKO	2 (6)	Dec 7, 1999	(United States) Yonkers Raceway, Yonkers, New York	
6	Win	6–0	(United States) Louis Gallucci	UD	4	Nov 9, 1999	(United States) Yonkers Raceway, Yonkers, New York	
5	Win	5–0	(United States) Greg Jones	TKO	2 (4)	Jul 20, 1999	(United States) Yonkers Raceway, Yonkers, New York	
4	Win	4–0	(United States) Tom Williams	PTS	4	Jun 24, 1999	(United States) Atlanta, Georgia	
3	Win	3–0	(United States) Randy Martin	TKO	1 (4), 1:03	Jun 18, 1999	(United States) SE Livestock Pavilion, Ocala, Florida	
2	Win	2–0	Markowitz March	TKO	1 (4)	May 15, 1999	(United States) Fort Gordon's Gym One, Augusta, Georgia	
1	Win	1–0	(United States) Kinard Thomas	TKO	1 (4)	Apr 23, 1999	(United States) Greensboro Coliseum Complex, Greensboro, North Carolina	Professional debut
