= Israel Garcia (boxer) =

Puerto Rican boxer

Personal information
- Nickname: King Kong
- Nationality: (Puerto Rico) Puerto Rican
- Born: Israel Carlos Garcia; May 12, 1970 (age 56) San Juan, Puerto Rico
- Height: 6 ft 4 in (1.93 m)
- Weight: Heavyweight

Boxing career
- Reach: 77 in (197 cm)
- Stance: Southpaw

Boxing record
- Total fights: 23
- Wins: 20
- Win by KO: 11
- Losses: 3
- Draws: 0
- No contests: 0

Israel Carlos Garcia (born May 12, 1970) is a Puerto Rican former professional boxer who competed from 1998 to 2010. He has 20 wins out of 23 matches. He is 6 ft 4 in (1.93 m).

== Professional career ==
On September 25, 2008 Garcia was knocked out by Mexican American Cristobal Arreola in the third round. That didn't stop him from pursuing his career as a professional boxer.

== Professional record ==
20 Wins (11 knockouts), 3 Losses, 0 Draw
Res.	Record	Opponent	Type	Rd., Time	Date	Location	Notes
Win	20-3-0	(United States) Brett Smith	DQ	3 (8), (0:50)	March 31, 2010	Trusts Stadium, Auckland, New Zealand	Smith disqualified for Headbutting & wrestling
Loss	19-3-0	(Russia) Denis Boytsov	TKO	2 (1:17)	February 2, 2009	Rostock, Mecklenburg-Vorpommern, Germany	vacant WBA Inter-Continental heavyweight title
Loss	19-2-0	(United States) Cristobal Arreola	TKO	3 (1:11)	September 25, 2008	Soboba Casino, San Jacinto, California	WBC Continental Americas heavyweight title
