= Nagy Aguilera =

Dominican Republic boxer

Personal information
- Nickname: Dominican Dynamite
- Nationality: Dominican
- Born: Nagy Aguilera De La Rosa; May 28, 1986 (age 40)
- Height: 6 ft 2 in (188 cm)
- Weight: Heavyweight

Boxing career
- Reach: 76 in (193 cm)
- Stance: Orthodox

Boxing record
- Total fights: 34
- Wins: 23
- Win by KO: 15
- Losses: 11
- Draws: 0
- No contests: 0

Nagy Aguilera De La Rosa (born May 28, 1986) is a Dominican professional boxer with a record of 23 wins and 11 losses with 3 by the way of KO.

== Professional career ==
=== 2009 ===
Nagy Aguilera knocked out in 2009 the former WBC Heavyweight Champion Oleg Maskaev in the first round on December 11, 2009, in what was considered an big upset. Since then, Aguilera has been considered a journeyman of the ring with more losses and less wins.

=== 2010 ===
He has also previously fought (and lost by Knockout) to Samuel Peter and Antonio Tarver.

=== 2011 ===
On May 14, 2011, Aguilera lost by K.O. to Mexican-American Chris Arreola.

=== 2012 ===
In March 2012 he lost to Tomasz Adamek by unanimous decision: 99–91, 100-90 y 100–90.

== Professional boxing record ==
34 fights	23 wins	11 losses
By knockout	15	3
By decision	8	7
By disqualification	0	1

No.	Result	Record	Opponent	Type	Round, time	Date	Location	Notes
34	Win	23–11	(Colombia) Deivis Casseres	TKO	3 (10)	18/12/2021	(Mexico) Ciudad Del Carmen	
33	Win	22–11	(Mexico) Hugo Lomeli	UD	8	23/10/2021	(Mexico) Arena Chito, Ciudad Del Carmen	
32	Loss	21–11	(Cuba) Frank Sánchez	TD	6 (10)	08/05/2021	(United States) AT&T Stadium, Arlington, Texas,	
31	Win	21–10	(United States) Terrell Jamal Woods	UD	6	28/11/2020	(United States) Arabia Shrine Center, Houston, Texas	
30	Loss	20–10	(Poland) Sergiej Werwejko	TKO	4 (8)	09/09/2017	(Poland) Stadion MOSiR, Radom	
29	Win	20–9	(Poland) Marcin Rekowski	TKO	10 (10)	26/09/2015	(Poland) Atlas Arena, Łódź	
28	Loss	19–9	(United States) Gerald Washington	UD	8	22/08/2014	(United States) Sports Center, Fairfield, California	
27	Loss	19–8	(United States) Dominic Breazeale	UD	8	03/04/2014	(United States) Fantasy Springs Casino, Indio, California	
26	Win	19–7	(United States) Eric Lindsey	TKO	2	24/10/2013	(United States) Petroleum Club, Shreveport, Louisiana	
25	Win	18–7	(United States) Zack Page	UD	6	20/02/2013	(United States) Bayou Event Center, Houston, Texas	
24	Loss	17–7	(Poland) Tomasz Adamek	UD	10	24/03/2012	(United States) Aviator Sports and Events Center, Brooklyn, New York	
23	Win	17–6	(United States) Stacy Frazier	TKO	3	11/02/2012	(United States) Houston Athletic Fencing Center, Houston, Texas	
22	Loss	16–6	(United States) Chris Arreola	KO	3	14/05/2011	(United States) Home Depot Center, Carson, California	
21	Loss	16–5	(United States) Antonio Tarver	UD	10	15/10/2010	(United States) Buffalo Run Casino, Miami, Oklahoma	
20	Loss	16–4	(United States) Maurice Harris	UD	12	06/08/2010	(United States) Grand Casino, Hinckley, Minnesota	IBF USBA Heavyweight Title
19	Win	16–3	(United States) Roderick Willis	KO	1	10/07/2010	(United States) Mid-Hudson Civic Center, Poughkeepsie, New York	
18	Loss	15–3	(Nigeria) Samuel Peter	TKO	2	12/03/2010	(United States) Gaylord Texan, Grapevine, Texas	
17	Win	15–2	(Russia) Oleg Maskaev	TKO	1	11/12/2009	(United States) Sacramento Memorial Auditorium, Sacramento, California	
16	Win	14–2	(United States) Jerome Johnson	TKO	1	08/10/2009	(United States) Hilton Americas Hotel, Houston, Texas	
15	Loss	13–2	(United States) Darrel Madison	SD	8	31/07/2009	(United States) Saratoga Performing Arts Center, Saratoga Springs, New York	New York Heavyweight Title
14	Win	13–1	(United States) Jermell Barnes	UD	6	08/05/2009	(United States) Plattduetsche Park Restaurant, Franklin Square, New York	
13	Win	12–1	(United States) Dennis Matthews	TKO	4	10/04/2009	(United States) Kansas Expo Center, Topeka, Kansas	
12	Win	11–1	(United States) David Quinn Robinson	KO	2	28/02/2009	(United States) Batesville Armory, Batesville, Arkansas	
11	Loss	10–1	(United States) Marcellus Brown	DQ	2	04/12/2008	(United States) Roseland Ballroom, New York City, New York	
10	Win	10–0	(United States) Douglas Robertson	UD	4	11/10/2008	(United States) Four States Arena, Texarkana, Arkansas	
9	Win	9–0	(United States) Gary Wilcox	UD	8	25/07/2008	(United States) Saratoga Performing Arts Center, Saratoga Springs, New York	
8	Win	8–0	(United States) Jason Bergman	KO	1	29/05/2008	(United States) Tioga Downs, Nichols, New York	
7	Win	7–0	(United States) Mike Jones	KO	1	06/03/2008	(United States) Manhattan Center, New York City, New York	
6	Win	6–0	(United States) Jeremiah Williams	RTD	3	09/02/2008	(United States) La Porte Civic Auditorium, La Porte, Indiana	
5	Win	5–0	(United States) Darryl Holley	TKO	3	13/12/2007	(United States) Roseland Ballroom, New York City, New York	
4	Win	4–0	(United States) Elfair McKnight	UD	4	09/11/2007	(United States) Paradise Theater, Bronx, New York	
3	Win	3–0	(United States) Tyrone Smith	KO	3	12/10/2007	(United States) Twin River Casino, Lincoln, Rhode Island	
2	Win	2–0	(United States) Rubin Bracero	UD	4	14/09/2007	(United States) Huntington Hilton Hotel, Melville, New York	
1	Win	1–0	(United States) Tyyab Beale	KO	2	03/08/2007	(United States) Monticello Raceway, Monticello, New York	
