= Joey Abell =

American boxer

Personal information
- Nickname: Minnesota Ice
- Born: May 16, 1981 (age 45) Neenah, Wisconsin, U.S.
- Height: 6 ft 4 in (193 cm)
- Weight: Heavyweight

Boxing career
- Reach: 76 in (193 cm)
- Stance: Southpaw

Boxing record
- Total fights: 48
- Wins: 35
- Win by KO: 33
- Losses: 11
- No contests: 2

Joey Abell (born May 16, 1981) is an American professional boxer.

== Early life ==
Abell is a native of Minneapolis, Minnesota. He attended Champlin Park High School, and later played football at South Dakota State University, where he majored in Education and Human Science.

== Amateur career ==
As an amateur, Abell won a silver medal at the 1998 U.S. Junior Championships at 201 lbs, losing to Malik Scott in the final. He later won gold in the super heavyweight division at the 1999 Under-19 Championships.

== Professional career ==
The first fight of Abell's professional career was marred when his opponent, Ritchie Goosehead, fell through the ropes and landed on the cement. The fight was ruled a no-contest. Abell knocked out Goosehead in his second professional fight about a month later. Abell remained undefeated through ten bouts, then he was KOd by Aaron Lyons at The Blue Horizon in Philadelphia, Pennsylvania. Abell later rematched Lyons and KO'd him. As of May 16, 2009, Abell's professional record was 24 wins (23 by knockout), 4 losses, no draws, and 1 no contest.

Abell defeated his first notable opponent in undefeated Teke Oruh of Nigeria on points, in a fight televised on Showtime on November 16, 2007. Abell then defeated Billy Willis by third round TKO. In 2008 he went on to lose a string of bouts, including a loss to former world champion Alfred Cole. In January 2011 A distracted Abell was defeated in the first round by heavyweight contender Chris Arreola. Abell's last two losses came at the hands of #2 (Tyson Fury) and #3 (Kubrat Pulev). Both fights were taken with a couple of days' notice.

On May 17, 2016, Abell knocked out, then undefeated Wes Nofire and continued his winning streak with two more wins coming by way of KO.

== Professional boxing record ==
48 fights	35 wins	11 losses
By knockout	33	9
By decision	2	1
By disqualification	0	1
No contests	2	

No.	Result	Record	Opponent	Type	Round, time	Date	Location	Notes
48	Loss	35–11 (2)	Michael Polite Coffie	TKO	2 (8)	Nov 7, 2020	Microsoft Theater, Los Angeles, California, U.S.	
47	Win	35–10 (2)	Quincy Palmer	KO	1 (6)	Nov 2, 2018	The Myth, Maplewood, Minnesota, U.S.	
46	Loss	34–10 (2)	Tomasz Adamek	TKO	7 (10)	Apr 21, 2018	Hala Sportowa, Częstochowa, Poland	For Republic of Poland International heavyweight title
45	Win	34–9 (2)	Krzysztof Zimnoch	KO	3 (12)	Sep 9, 2017	Stadion MOSiR, Radom, Poland	
44	Win	33–9 (2)	Raymond Ochieng	TKO	2 (10)	Feb 25, 2017	Blaine Sports Center, Blaine, Minnesota, U.S.	
43	Win	32–9 (2)	Wes Nofire	TKO	3 (8)	May 17, 2016	Black Bear Casino, Carlton, Minnesota, U.S.	
42	Loss	31–9 (2)	Oscar Rivas	KO	2 (10)	Nov 28, 2015	Videotron Centre, Quebec City, Canada	
41	Win	31–8 (2)	Juan Goode	UD	6	Oct 17, 2015	Black Bear Casino, Carlton, Minnesota, U.S.	
40	Win	30–8 (2)	Travis Fulton	TKO	3 (6)	Apr 17, 2015	Grand Casino, Hinckley, Minnesota, U.S.	
39	Loss	29–8 (2)	Tyson Fury	TKO	4 (10)	Feb 15, 2014	Copper Box Arena, London, England	
38	Loss	29–7 (2)	Kubrat Pulev	TKO	4 (12)	Dec 14, 2013	Jahnsportforum, Neubrandenburg, Germany	For IBF International heavyweight title
37	Win	29–6 (2)	Maurenzo Smith	RTD	1 (6)	Jul 26, 2013	Hyatt Regency Hotel, Minneapolis, Minnesota, U.S.	
36	Loss	28–6 (2)	Fres Oquendo	TKO	9 (10)	Dec 14, 2013	Horseshoe Casino, Hammond, Indiana, U.S.	For vacant WBA Fedelatin heavyweight title
35	Win	28–5 (2)	Emerson Chasing Bear	RTD	4 (6), 3:00	Jan 28, 2012	Williston College, Williston, North Dakota, U.S.	
34	Loss	27–5 (2)	Chris Arreola	KO	1 (10), 2:18	Jan 28, 2011	Pechanga Resort & Casino, Temecula, California, U.S.	
33	Win	27–4 (2)	Arron Lyons	TKO	4 (10) 0:52	Jul 17, 2010	St. Paul Armory, Saint Paul, Minnesota, U.S.	
32	Win	26–4 (2)	Josh Gutcher	TKO	2 (8), 0:52	Apr 23, 2010	St. Paul Armory, Saint Paul, Minnesota, U.S.	
31	NC	25–4 (2)	Raphael Butler	NC	1 (10)	Dec 4, 2009	Target Center, Minneapolis, Minnesota, U.S.	For vacant Minnesota State heavyweight title; Referee failed to hear bell and called fighters together to continue fighting, Butler was knocked out by Abell prompting both corners to enter into a brawl which negated the bout
30	Win	25–4 (1)	Larry White	TKO	2 (6)	Jun 13, 2009	Robert's Off Ten, Mounds View, Minnesota, U.S.	
29	Win	24–4 (1)	Billy Willis	TKO	3 (6), 0:54	May 15, 2009	The Blue Horizon, Philadelphia, Pennsylvania, U.S.	
28	Win	23–4 (1)	Galen Brown	KO	1 (6), 1:43	Apr 4, 2009	Epic Night Club, Minneapolis, Minnesota, U.S.	
27	Win	22–4 (1)	Marcus Rhode	KO	1 (6)	Feb 13, 2009	Epic Night Club, Minneapolis, Minnesota, U.S.	
26	Win	21–4 (1)	Derek Amos	TKO	1 (6), 2:58	Jan 17, 2009	St. Paul Armory, Saint Paul, Minnesota, U.S.	
25	Loss	20–4 (1)	Jason Nicholson	DQ	1 (8)	Nov 28, 2008	Sioux Falls Convention Center, Sioux Falls, South Dakota, U.S.	Abell disqualified for hitting Nicholson while he was down
24	Loss	20–3 (1)	Al Cole	SD	6	Sep 5, 2008	Nojesfabriken, Karlstad, Sweden	
23	Loss	20–2 (1)	Andrew Greeley	TKO	4 (6), 2:58	Apr 26, 2008	Graham Arena, Rochester, Minnesota, U.S.	
22	Win	20–1 (1)	Maurice Wheeler	KO	2 (6)	Apr 11, 2008	The Blue Horizon, Philadelphia, Pennsylvania, U.S.	
21	Win	19–1 (1)	Ratko Draskovic	KO	2 (6)	Mar 27, 2008	Lisebergshallen, Gothenburg, Sweden	
20	Win	18–1 (1)	Teke Oruh	MD	10	Nov 16, 2007	Beausejour Cricket Ground, Gros Islet, Saint Lucia	
19	Win	17–1 (1)	Daniil Peretyatko	TKO	2 (4)	Sep 15, 2007	Löfbergs Arena, Karlstad, Sweden	
18	Win	16–1 (1)	Levon Warner	KO	1 (8), 2:52	Sep 7, 2007	The Blue Horizon, Philadelphia, Pennsylvania, U.S.	
17	Win	15–1 (1)	Mike Sheppard	KO	1 (4), 2:10	Aug 4, 2007	Allstate Arena, Rosemont, Illinois, U.S.	
16	Win	14–1 (1)	Harvey Jolly	TKO	2 (6), 1:55	Apr 25, 2007	Roy Wilkins Auditorium, Saint Paul, Minnesota, U.S.	
15	Win	13–1 (1)	James Gerstein	KO	1 (6), 1:27	Mar 17, 2007	Grand Casino, Hinckley, Minnesota, U.S.	
14	Win	12–1 (1)	Cornelius Ellis	RTD	3 (6), 3:00	Feb 9, 2007	The Blue Horizon, Philadelphia, Pennsylvania, U.S.	
13	Win	11–1 (1)	Ergin Solmaz	RTD	2 (4), 3:00	Jan 27, 2007	Scandinavium, Gothenburg, Sweden	
12	Win	10–1 (1)	Larry White	TKO	6 (6), 1:50	Jan 12, 2007	Target Center, Minneapolis, Minnesota, U.S.	
11	Loss	9–1 (1)	Arron Lyons	TKO	1 (4), 1:17	Dec 1, 2006	The Blue Horizon, Philadelphia, Pennsylvania, U.S.	
10	Win	9–0 (1)	Louis Monaco	TKO	4 (6), 0:30	Oct 13, 2006	The Blue Horizon, Philadelphia, Pennsylvania, U.S	
9	Win	8–0 (1)	David Cleage	KO	2 (4), 2:51	Sep 15, 2006	The Blue Horizon, Philadelphia, Pennsylvania, U.S.	
8	Win	7–0 (1)	Mark Brown	KO	2 (6), 2:14	Jul 7, 2006	The Blue Horizon, Philadelphia, Pennsylvania, U.S.	
7	Win	6–0 (1)	Douglas Robertson	KO	1 (4), 2:23	Apr 7, 2006	The Blue Horizon, Philadelphia, Pennsylvania, U.S.	
6	Win	5–0 (1)	Cornell Bradbury	TKO	1 (4), 2:25	Mar 15, 2006	Merrionette Park, Illinois, U.S.	
5	Win	4–0 (1)	Dan Jambor	KO	1 (4), 1:15	Feb 10, 2006	The Blue Horizon, Philadelphia, Pennsylvania, U.S.	
4	Win	3–0 (1)	Marcelo Aravena	TKO	1 (4), 2:00	Nov 19, 2005	Seven Clans Casino, Thief River Falls, Minnesota, U.S.	
3	Win	2–0 (1)	Andrew Goodwin	TKO	2 (4)	Oct 15, 2005	Chez Peree Club, Carter Lake, Iowa, U.S.	
2	Win	1–0 (1)	Ritchie Goosehead	TKO	2 (4), 1:58	Sep 23 2005	Winnipeg Convention Centre, Winnipeg, Canada	
1	NC	0–0 (1)	Ritchie Goosehead	NC	1 (4), 2:52	Aug 27, 2005	Seven Clans Casino, Thief River Falls, Minnesota, U.S.	Bout stopped after Goosehead fell through ropes, landing outside ring
