= Teke Oruh =

Nigerian boxer (born 1978)

Medal record

Men's boxing

Representing Nigeria

All-Africa Games
Bronze medal – third place	1999 Johannesburg	Super heavyweight

Teke Oruh (born 8 August 1978), alias African Prince, is a Nigerian former professional boxer who competed from 2001 to 2010.

== Amateur ==
Oruh won Bronze at the 1999 All-Africa Games.

== Professional career ==
Oruh made his professional debut, a first-round knockout of Gustavo Robleto, on 28 July 2001. To date his professional record is 14 wins (6 by knockout) and one loss with 1 draw after getting outpointed by Joey Abell on Showtime.

== Professional boxing record ==
14 Wins (6 knockouts, 8 decisions), 3 Losses (1 knockout, 2 decisions), 1 Draw
Result	Record	Opponent	Type	Round	Date	Location	Notes
Loss	19-0	(Russia) Alexander Povetkin	KO	5	16/10/2010	Chekhov, Russia	Oruh knocked out at 2:57 of the fifth round.
Loss	24-4	(United States) Manuel Quezada	UD	10	29/11/2008	Ontario, California, U.S.	
Loss	17-1	(United States) Joey Abell	MD	10	16/11/2007	Gros Islet, Saint Lucia	
Win	11-2-2	(United States) Jason Gavern	MD	6	24/05/2007	San Jose, California, U.S.	
Win	12-8-1	(United States) John Clark	MD	6	22/02/2007	Lemoore, California, U.S.	
Win	9-10	(United States) Willie Perryman	TKO	6	14/09/2006	San Jose, California, U.S.	Referee stopped the bout at 2:13 of the sixth round.
Win	3-4	(United States) Shaun Tyrone Ross	UD	4	20/07/2006	San Jose, California, U.S.	
Win	4-17-4	(United States) David Johnson	UD	4	03/03/2006	Temecula, California, U.S.	
Win	2-5-1	(United States) Douglas Robertson	KO	1	15/12/2005	Lemoore, California, U.S.	Robertson knocked out at 2:37 of the first round.
Win	2-1	(United States) Shaun Tyrone Ross	TKO	3	29/04/2005	Las Vegas, Nevada, U.S.	Referee stopped the bout at 0:18 of the third round.
Win	7-2-1	(Brazil) Marcelino Novaes	UD	6	27/08/2004	Las Vegas, Nevada, U.S.	
Win	1-6-2	(United States) Lee Lark	TKO	1	21/11/2003	Whittier, California, U.S.	Referee stopped the bout at 3:00 of the first round.
Win	6-8-2	(United States) Marcus Harvey	UD	6	10/05/2003	Hollywood, California, U.S.	
Win	1-1	(United States) Emanuel Laurents	UD	4	08/03/2003	Tustin, California, U.S.	
Win	1-2	(Mexico) Gerardo Yanez	KO	1	24/01/2003	Ventura, California, U.S.	Yanez knocked out at 2:40 of the first round.
Draw	7-1	(United States) Derek Berry	PTS	4	01/02/2002	Phoenix, Arizona, U.S.	
Win	1-1	(United States) Hector Ferreyro	UD	4	21/08/2001	Tempe, Arizona, U.S.	
Win	1-6	(United States) Gustavo Robleto	TKO	1	28/07/2001	Fort Myers, Florida, U.S.	Referee stopped the bout at 1:39 of the first round.
