= Brian Minto =

American boxer (born 1975)

Personal information
- Nickname: The Beast
- Born: January 27, 1975 (age 51) Butler, Pennsylvania, U.S.
- Height: 5 ft 11 in (180 cm)
- Weight: Heavyweight; Cruiserweight

Boxing career
- Reach: 74 in (188 cm)
- Stance: Orthodox

Boxing record
- Total fights: 53
- Wins: 42
- Win by KO: 27
- Losses: 11

Brian Matthew Minto (born January 27, 1975) is an American former professional boxer who competed from 2002 to 2016. He challenged once for the WBO cruiserweight world title in 2010. His final professional boxing record is 42-11 (27 KO's).

== Professional career ==
=== Early Career ===
Minto turned pro in 2002 and won his first 18 bouts, gaining the West Virginia heavyweight boxing title. In 2004, Minto had a bout with former WBA heavyweight world champion Tony Tubbs. The inactive Tubbs won in a mild upset, giving Minto his first professional loss. Minto has been featured on ESPN fight cards, including two TKO wins over Vincent Maddalone in 2004 and 2005. In November 2006, Minto scored an upset win (TKO in the sixth round) over Axel Schulz, foiling the German's comeback attempt. Minto's second defeat came from one-time WBO heavyweight contender Luan Krasniqi on March 17, 2007 in Stuttgart, Germany.

On July 2, 2008, at Pullman Park in his hometown of Butler, Minto defeated John Poore by first-round technical knockout. Minto knocked Poore down three times before the bout was stopped. After his fight with John Poore he fought Galen Brown on November 1, 2008, and defeated him by fourth-round knockout after his original opponent Marcus McGee pulled out due to a shoulder injury.

=== Later Career ===
Minto fought Matt Greer on April 17, 2009, in a fight which he won by unanimous decision. He fought Donnell Holmes on August 14, 2009, for the interim WBO NABO heavyweight title in which he won a technical decision after the fight was stopped on four rounds. The judges gave Minto the decision with the scores of 40–36, 39–37, and 39–37 and it was also Holmes first loss of his career.

Brian Minto fought Chris Arreola on December 5, 2009 on the undercard for the Paul Williams vs Sergio Martinez. After getting hit constantly with right hands he was dropped in the fourth round. He stood up at eight and proceeded to get hit with more clean right hands from Arreola before being dropped again. Minto rose at nine and the referee stopped the fight as he appeared to be in no condition to proceed with the fight. On May 1, 2010, Minto moved down to the cruiserweight division to challenge Marco Huck for the WBO cruiserweight world title. Minto was defeated by Huck by a 10th round (end of nine) RTD.

== Personal life ==
Brian has a wife named Heidi and two children, Megan and Matthew.

== Professional boxing record ==
53 fights, 42 wins (27 knockouts), 11 losses (6 knockouts)
Result	Record	Opponent	Type	Round	Date	Location	Notes
Win	42–11	(Hungary) András Csomor	TKO	5 (8)	17/09/2016	(United States) Kelly Automotive Park, Butler, Pennsylvania	Minto announces his retirement
Loss	41–11	(Germany) Edmund Gerber	TKO	2 (10)	05/03/2016	(Russia) Colosseum Sport Hall, Grozny	
Loss	41–10	(United Kingdom) Dillian Whyte	TKO	3 (10)	12/09/2015	(United Kingdom) Millennium Dome, London	For WBC International Silver heavyweight title
Loss	41–9	(Nigeria) Israel Adesanya	SD	3 (4)	28/03/2015	(New Zealand) Horncastle Arena, Christchurch	
Win	41–8	(Australia) Daniel Ammann	UD	3 (3)	28/03/2015	(New Zealand) Horncastle Arena, Christchurch	
Win	40–8	(New Zealand) Monty Filimaea	TKO	2 (3)	28/03/2015	(New Zealand) Horncastle Arena, Christchurch	
Loss	39–8	(New Zealand) Joseph Parker	RTD	7 (12)	05/17/2014	(New Zealand) Vodafone Events Centre, Manukau	For WBO Oriental and Interim PABA heavyweight titles.
Win	39–7	(New Zealand) Shane Cameron	RTD	7 (12)	14/12/2013	(New Zealand) Auckland	Won vacant WBO Oriental heavyweight title.
Win	38–7	(United Kingdom) Tom Little	SD	3 (3)	14/11/2013	(United Kingdom) London	
Loss	37–7	(United Kingdom) Michael Sprott	UD	3 (3)	14/11/2013	(United Kingdom) London	
Loss	37–6	(Poland) Artur Szpilka	UD	10 (10)	15/06/2013	(Poland) Bydgoszcz	
Win	37–5	(United States) Mike Sheppard	TKO	4 (12)	18/08/2012	(United States) Mountaineer Casino Racetrack and Resort, Chester, West Virginia	
Win	36–5	(United States) Matt Hicks	TKO	1 (6)	28/04/2012	(United States) Mountaineer Casino Racetrack and Resort, Chester, West Virginia	
Loss	35–5	(United States) Tony Grano	TKO	3 (10)	28/01/2012	(United States) Turning Stone Resort & Casino, Verona, New York	
Win	35–4	(United States) Pierre Karam	RTD	2 (10)	29/10/2010	(United States) Ghost Riders’ Entertainment Complex, Butler, Pennsylvania	Won vacant WBC Continental Americas cruiserweight title.
Loss	34–4	(Germany) Marco Huck	RTD	9 (12)	01/05/2010	(Germany) Weser-Ems-Halle, Oldenburg	For WBO cruiserweight title
Loss	34–3	(United States) Chris Arreola	TKO	4 (10)	05/12/2009	(United States) Boardwalk Hall, Atlantic City, New Jersey	
Win	34–2	(United States) Donnell Holmes	TD	4 (12)	14/08/2009	(United States) Pullman Park, Butler, Pennsylvania	Retained WBA Fedecentro heavyweight title
Win	33–2	(United States) Matthew Greer	UD	8	17/04/2009	(United States) Days Inn, Butler, Pennsylvania	
Win	32–2	(United States) Galen Brown	TKO	4 (10)	01/11/2008	(United States) Morrow Arena, Slippery Rock, Pennsylvania	Retained WBA Fedecentro heavyweight title.
Win	31–2	(United States) John Poore	KO	1 (10)	02/07/2008	(United States) Pullman Park, Butler, Pennsylvania	Retained WBA Fedecentro heavyweight title
Win	30–2	(United States) Chad Van Sickle	RTD	1 (12)	27/04/2008	(United States) Mountaineer Casino Racetrack and Resort, Chester, West Virginia	Retained WBA Fedecentro heavyweight title
Win	29–2	(United States) Byron Polley	KO	1 (10)	30/12/2007	(United States) Mountaineer Casino Racetrack and Resort, Chester, West Virginia	Won vacant WBA Fedecentro heavyweight title
Win	28–2	(United States) Ray Lunsford	TKO	1 (8)	23/08/2007	(United States) Mountaineer Casino Racetrack and Resort, Chester, West Virginia	
Loss	27–2	(Germany) Luan Krasniqi	UD	12	17/03/2007	(Germany) Hanns-Martin-Schleyer-Halle, Stuttgart	For vacant WBO Inter-Continental heavyweight title.
Win	27–1	(Germany) Axel Schulz	TKO	6 (10)	25/11/2006	(Germany) Gerry Weber Stadium, Halle	
Win	26–1	(United States) Andy Sample	KO	1 (6)	11/08/2006	(United States) Mountaineer Casino Racetrack and Resort, Chester, West Virginia	
Win	25–1	(United States) Danny Batchelder	UD	10	09/06/2006	(United States) Tropicana Hotel & Casino, Atlantic City, New Jersey	
Win	24–1	(United States) Billy Zumbrun	UD	8	28/04/2006	(United States) Mohegan Sun Casino, Uncasville, Connecticut	
Win	23–1	(United States) Troy Weida	TKO	3 (8)	30/12/2005	(United States) Mountaineer Casino Racetrack and Resort, Chester, West Virginia	
Win	22–1	(United States) Forrest Neal	KO	2 (8)	23/11/2005	(United States) Mountaineer Casino Racetrack and Resort, Chester	
Win	21–1	(United States) Vinny Maddalone	TKO	7 (10)	Oct 1, 2005	(United States) St. Pete Times Forum, Tampa, Florida	
Win	20–1	(United States) Jermell Barnes	UD	8	12/07/2005	Days Inn, Butler, Pennsylvania, United States	

Vacant Title last held by Alex Leapai	WBO Oriental Heavyweight Champion; 14 December 2013 – 5 July 2014	Succeeded by Joseph Parker
