= Chauncy Welliver =

American boxer (born 1983)

Personal information
- Nickname: Hillyard Hammer
- Nationality: American; New Zealand
- Born: Chauncy Welliver; 28 April 1983 (age 43) Spokane, Washington, USA
- Height: 6 ft 2 in (188 cm)
- Weight: Heavyweight

Boxing career
- Stance: Orthodox

Boxing record
- Total fights: 75
- Wins: 57
- Win by KO: 23
- Losses: 13
- Draws: 5

Chauncy Welliver (born 28 April 1983) is an American-New Zealand professional boxer from Spokane, Washington who lived in Auckland, New Zealand. He fought in the heavyweight division and has a career record of 57–13–5 (25 KOs). Throughout his career he was never knocked down and at one point the WBC ranked him the 5th best heavyweight in the world. He last fought in August 2020.

== Career ==
He came to widespread attention when he fought Odlanier Solís in October 2008. He lost by stoppage the ninth round.

Welliver was then rated in the top-10 for some time by both the WBC and WBO after picking up numerous titles from limited opposition. His ranking dropped however when he suffered two defeats in 2012, being outpointed by Sherman Williams and Kyotaro Fujimoto.

His ring name is the Hillyard Hammer. He is currently trained by former Native American heavyweight title challenger, Joe "The Boss" Hipp. His current manager is Roland Jankelson. He is also a heavyweight consultant for the boxing radio show On The Ropes. Welliver trains and coaches amateur boxers at Boxfit in Spokane, Washington.

On 31 January 2015, Welliver lost to rugby football star Sonny Bill Williams, in what he has described as the biggest fight of his career. and Williams as "a better athlete than Michael Jordan."

== Professional boxing record ==
75 fights	57 wins	13 losses
By knockout	23	3
By decision	31	9
By disqualification	3	1
Draws	5	

Res.	Record	Opponent	Result	Rd., Time	Date	Location	Notes
Loss	55–12–5	(United States) Marselles Brown	SD	6	2016-07-30	(Mexico) Auditorio Municipal, Tijuana, Baja California	
Loss	55–11–5	(New Zealand) Sonny Bill Williams	UD	8	2015-01-31	(Australia) Allphones, Sydney, New South Wales	
Loss	55–10–5	(Russia) Alexander Ustinov	UD	8	2014-12-11	(Russia) Dynamo Palace of Sports in Krylatskoye, Moscow	
Loss	55–9–5	(Australia) Lucas Browne	RTD	5 (12)	2014-11-12	(Australia) Hisense Arena, Melbourne, Victoria	For WBC Eurasia Pacific Boxing Council heavyweight title and WBA Inter-Continental heavyweight title.
Loss	55–8–5	(United States) Billy Wright	RTD	5 (12), 3:00	2014-02-14	(New Zealand) TSB Stadium, New Plymouth, North Island	For WBC Latino and WBC FECARBOX heavyweight titles. Lost WBC Asian Boxing Council heavyweight title.
Win	55–7–5	(Bolivia) Saul Farah	TKO	3 (10), 2:35	2013-06-02	(Chile) Teatro Caupolicán, Santiago, Santiago Province	
Win	54–7–5	(United States) Donnie Davis	TKO	1 (8)	2012-11-09	(United States) Flathead County Fairgrounds, Kalispell, Montana	
Loss	53–7–5	(Japan) Kyotaro Fujimoto	UD	10	2012-09-19	(Japan) Korakuen Hall, Tokyo, Kantō	
Loss	53–6–5	(The Bahamas) Sherman Williams	MD	12	2012-06-28	(Macau) Grand Waldo Conference & Exhibition Centre, Cotai	Lost WBO China Zone and interim WBO Asia Pacific heavyweight titles.
Win	53–5–5	(United States) Bert Cooper	UD	10	2012-04-05	(United States) Capitol Plaza Hotel, Jefferson City, Missouri	Retained WBC Continental Americas heavyweight title.
Win	52–5–5	(Ghana) Moyoyo Mensah	RTD	10 (12), 1:56	2012-01-28	(New Zealand) The Corporate Box, Auckland, Auckland Region	Retained NZNBF, WBC Asian Boxing Council and interim WBO Asia Pacific heavyweight titles. Won vacant WBO Oriental heavyweight title.
Win	51–5–5	(United States) Galen Brown	DQ	7 (12), 0:59	2011-11-26	(United States) Union Plaza, Jefferson City, Missouri	Retained WBC Continental Americas heavyweight title.
Win	50–5–5	(United States) Rob Calloway	UD	12	2011-10-03	Tianjin Olympic Center Stadium, Tianjin, North China	Won vacant WBO China Zone heavyweight title. Retained interim WBO Asia Pacific heavyweight title.
Win	49–5–5	(Samoa) Lawrence Tauasa	TKO	4 (12)	2011-06-28	Huili, Sichuan, Southwest China	Won vacant WBC Asian Boxing Council heavyweight title.
Win	48–5–5	(United States) Byron Polley	KO	4 (12), 1:04	2011-06-11	(United States) Memorial Hall, Kansas City, Kansas	Retained WBC Continental Americas heavyweight title.
Win	47–5–5	(United States) Galen Brown	TKO	5 (10), 1:27	2011-04-23	(United States) Expo Center, Topeka, Kansas	Retained WBC Continental Americas heavyweight title.
Win	46–5–5	(United States) Jimmy Haynes	TKO	4 (10), 1:17	2011-02-04	(United States) National Guard Armory, Williamsburg, Kentucky	Retained WBC Continental Americas heavyweight title.
Win	45–5–5	(United States) Brad Gregory	TKO	3 (12), 1:30	2010-10-29	(United States) DeCarlo's Convention Center, Warren, Michigan	Retained WBC Continental Americas heavyweight title.
Win	44–5–5	(New Zealand) Daniel Tai	UD	12	2010-08-21	(New Zealand) Panmure Lagoon Stadium, Panmure, Auckland Region	Retained interim WBO Asia Pacific and NZNBF heavyweight titles.
Win	43–5–5	(United States) Joell Godfrey	UD	12	2010-07-24	(United States) The Pageant, St. Louis, Missouri	Retained WBC Continental Americas heavyweight title.
Win	42–5–5	(New Zealand) Daniel Tai	UD	12	2010-05-22	(New Zealand) Queen Elizabeth Youth Centre, Tauranga, Bay of Plenty Region	Retained interim WBO Asia Pacific and NZNBF heavyweight titles.
Win	41–5–5	(United States) Mike Sheppard	UD	10	2010-03-19	(United States) Choctaw Casino Resort, Durant, Oklahoma	Won vacant WBC Continental Americas heavyweight title.
Win	40–5–5	(New Zealand) Seiaute Mailata	UD	12	2009-11-07	(New Zealand) ABA Stadium, Auckland, Auckland Region	Retained NZNBF heavyweight title. Won interim WBO Asia Pacific heavyweight title.
Win	39–5–5	(New Zealand) Toa Naketoatama	UD	6	2009-10-29	(New Zealand) ABA Stadium, Auckland, Auckland Region	
Win	38–5–5	(New Zealand) Amosa Zinck	UD	6	2009-10-17	(New Zealand) ABA Stadium, Auckland, Auckland Region	
Win	37–5–5	(New Zealand) George Westerman	KO	1 (4)	2009-10-06	(New Zealand) Leisure Centre, Ōtara, Auckland Region	
Win	36–5–5	(New Zealand) David Gemmell	TKO	1 (6)	2009-09-26	(New Zealand) ABA Stadium, Auckland, Auckland Region	
Loss	35–5–5	(Cuba) Odlanier Solís	TKO	9 (12), 1:23	2008-10-11	(Germany) O2 World, Kreuzberg, Berlin	For vacant WBC International heavyweight title.
Win	35–4–5	(New Zealand) Mike Lloyd	UD	4	2008-08-19	(New Zealand) Leisure Centre, Ōtara, Auckland Region	
Win	34–4–5	(New Zealand) Daniel Tai	DQ	2 (12), 2:10	2008-08-16	(New Zealand) YMCA Stadium, Auckland, Auckland Region	Won NZNBF heavyweight title.
Win	33–4–5	(New Zealand) Oscar Talemaira	UD	6	2008-06-28	(New Zealand) TSB Bank Arena, Wellington, Wellington Region	
Draw	32–4–5	(New Zealand) Seiaute Mailata	PTS	6	2007-06-28	(New Zealand) Waitakere Trust Stadium, Auckland, Auckland Region	
Win	32–4–4	(United States) Corey Williams	TKO	6 (8), 2:56	2007-05-30	(United States) Northern Quest Casino, Airway Heights, Washington	Won CAM and Washington State heavyweight titles.
Win	31–4–4	(United States) Chad Van Sickle	SD	10	2007-03-08	(United States) Coeur d'Alene Casino, Worley, Idaho	
Win	30–4–4	(New Zealand) Richard Tutaki	UD	10	2006-12-09	(New Zealand) ABA Stadium, Auckland, Auckland Region	
Draw	29–4–4	(United States) Chad Van Sickle	PTS	10	2006-06-10	(United States) Lucky Eagle Casino, Rochester, Washington	For vacant NWBA heavyweight title.
Win	29–4–3	(United States) Brian McIntyre	TKO	3 (6), 2:30	2006-02-03	(United States) Northern Quest Casino, Airway Heights, Washington	
Win	28–4–3	(United States) Travis Fulton	TKO	4 (10), 1:40	2005-09-17	(United States) Emerald Queen Casino, Tacoma, Washington	
Win	27–4–3	(United States) Chris Lewallen	UD	12	2005-08-13	(United States) Clearwater River Casino, Lewiston, Idaho	Won FECARBOX and Youth World WBC interim heavyweight titles.
Win	26–4–3	(United States) David Robinson	UD	8	2005-06-16	(United States) Coeur d'Alene Casino, Worley, Idaho	
Win	25–4–3	(United States) Scott Lansdon	TKO	1 (8), 1:21	2005-06-04	(United States) Boomer's Garden, Lewiston, Idaho	
Win	24–4–3	(United States) Bridger Bercier	UD	6	2005-05-24	(United States) Northern Quest Casino, Airway Heights, Washington	
Win	23–4–3	(United States) Ted Reiter	UD	6	2005-04-15	(United States) Northern Quest Casino, Airway Heights, Washington	
Win	22–4–3	(United States) Ted Reiter	UD	6	2005-03-24	(United States) Coeur d'Alene Casino, Worley, Idaho	
Win	21–4–3	(New Zealand) Shane Wijohn	PTS	6	2005-03-05	(New Zealand) ETA Stadium, Auckland, Auckland Region	Won WBE Youth (Super) heavyweight title.
Loss	20–4–3	(New Zealand) Elisara Sii Uta	SD	6	2005-02-24	(New Zealand) ABA Stadium, Auckland, Auckland Region	
Win	20–3–3	(New Zealand) Oscar Talemaira	PTS	4	2005-01-27	(New Zealand) ABA Stadium, Auckland, Auckland Region	
Win	19–3–3	(New Zealand) Bob Gasio	UD	4	2004-12-11	(New Zealand) ETA Stadium, Auckland, Auckland Region	
Win	18–3–3	(New Zealand) Richard Tutaki	UD	6	2004-12-04	(New Zealand) Sky City Convention Centre, Auckland, Auckland Region	
Win	17–3–3	(United States) Chris Brown	UD	4	2004-07-31	(United States) Lucky Eagle Casino, Rochester, Washington	
Loss	16–3–3	(United States) David Bostice	UD	10	2004-05-20	(United States) Coeur d'Alene Casino, Worley, Idaho	
Loss	16–2–3	(United States) John Sargent	UD	8	2004-04-24	(United States) Shrine Auditorium, Billings, Montana	
Win	16–1–3	(United States) Chris Brown	TKO	1 (6), 2:55	2003-11-14	(United States) Seahawks Stadium, Seattle, Washington	
Draw	15–1–3	(United States) Ken Murphy	PTS	6	2003-10-11	(United States) Umatilla, Pendleton, Oregon	
Win	15–1–2	(United States) Billy Zumbrun	UD	8	2003-09-25	(United States) Coeur d'Alene Casino, Worley, Idaho	
Draw	14–1–2	(United States) John Clark	PTS	6	2003-09-06	(United States) Lucky Eagle Casino, Rochester, Washington	
Win	14–1–1	(United States) Wesley Martin	TKO	6 (10), 2:30	2003-08-22	(United States) Spokane Center, Spokane, Washington	
Win	13–1–1	(United States) Bradley Rone	TKO	5 (8), 3:00	2003-02-27	(United States) Coeur d'Alene Casino, Worley, Idaho	
Win	12–1–1	(Nigeria) King Ipitan	SD	8	2002-10-24	(United States) Coeur d'Alene Casino, Worley, Idaho	
Win	11–1–1	(Mexico) Felipe Bojorquez	DQ	3 (8)	2002-07-13	(United States) Lucky Eagle Casino, Rochester, Washington	Won NWBA heavyweight title.
Win	10–1–1	(United States) Craig Brinson	MD	6	2002-05-03	(United States) Youth Center, Cut Off, Louisiana	
Win	9–1–1	(United States) Bobby McGraw	TKO	1 (6)	2002-04-04	(United States) Coeur d'Alene Casino, Worley, Idaho	
Win	8–1–1	(United States) George Chamberlain	TKO	2 (6), 2:44	2002-02-20	(United States) Coeur d'Alene Casino, Worley, Idaho	
Win	7–1–1	(United States) Ricardo Raya	TKO	1 (4), 2:06	2002-02-05	(United States) Hawaii Convention Center, Honolulu, Hawaii	
Loss	6–1–1	(United States) Jonathan Williams	UD	6	2002-01-12	(United States) Emerald Queen Casino, Tacoma, Washington	
Draw	6–0–1	(United States) Jonathan Williams	PTS	4	2001-11-24	(United States) TRAC Arena, Pasco, Washington	
Win	6–0	(United States) John Clark	UD	4	2001-11-10	(United States) Emerald Queen Casino, Tacoma, Washington	
Win	5–0	(United States) Enoch Green	UD	4	2001-11-03	(United States) Lucky Eagle Casino, Rochester, Washington	
Win	4–0	(United States) Jim Brown	TKO	2 (4)	2001-09-28	(United States) Remingtons, Springfield, Missouri	
Win	3–0	(United States) Jonathan Williams	UD	4	2001-09-08	(United States) Lucky Eagle Casino, Rochester, Washington	
Win	2–0	(United States) Marcio Castillo	UD	4	2001-08-26	(United States) Coeur d'Alene Casino, Worley, Idaho	
Win	1–0	(United States) Thomas Eynon	KO	1 (4), 0:41	2001-06-23	(United States) Lucky Eagle Casino, Rochester, Washington	Professional debut.
