= List of British cruiserweight boxing champions =

List of British cruiserweight boxing champions is a table showing the boxers who have won the British cruiserweight title, which has been sanctioned by the British Boxing Board of Control (BBBoC) since 1985.

A champion will often voluntarily relinquish the title in order to fight for a higher-ranked championship, such as the world or European. Where the date on which a champion relinquished the title is unclear, the date of the last BBBoC sanctioned fight is shown.

^{r} – Champion relinquished title.
^{s} – Champion stripped of title.

Name	Duration of reign	Defences
Sammy Reeson	31 October 1985^{r}	0
Andy Straughn	25 October 1986 – 17 February 1987	1
Roy Smith	17 February 1987 – 9 May 1987	1
Tee Jay	9 May 1987 – 21 January 1988	1
Glenn McCrory	21 January 1988 – 22 April 1988^{r}	1
Andy Straughn	1 November 1988 – 21 May 1989	0
Johnny Nelson	21 May 1989 – 28 March 1990^{r}	2
Derek Angol	13 February 1991 – 8 May 1991^{r}	1
Carl Thompson	4 June 1992^{r}	0
Terry Dunstan	13 May 1995 – 11 May 1996^{r}	2
Johnny Nelson	14 December 1996^{r}	0
Bruce Scott	28 November 1998^{r}	0
Carl Thompson	3 December 1999^{r}	0
Bruce Scott	16 December 2000 – 10 March 2001^{r}	1
Mark Hobson	13 March 2004 – 1 June 2006^{r}	4
John Keeton	20 October 2006 – 29 September 2007	1
Mark Hobson	29 September 2007^{r}	0
Rob Norton	3 October 2008 – 21 October 2011	2
Leon Williams	21 October 2011 – 13 January 2012	1
Shane McPhilbin	13 January 2012 – 23 March 2012	1
Enzo Maccarinelli	23 March 2012^{r}	0
Jon-Lewis Dickinson	13 October 2012 – 7 June 2014	4
Ovill McKenzie	7 June 2014 – 27 March 2015^{r}	1
Matty Askin	26 May 2017 – 22 September 2018	1
Lawrence Okolie	22 September 2018 – 12 September 2019^{r}	1
Richard Riakporhe	19 December 2019 – September 2020	0
Chris Billam-Smith	31 July 2021 – ?	0
Mikael Lawal	27 November 2022 – 21 October 2023	0
Isaac Chamberlain	21 October 2023 – 10 April 2024^{r}	0
Cheaveon Clarke	25 May 2024 – 26 April 2025	0
Viddal Riley	26 April 2025 – 2026^{r}	0
Pat Brown	19 September 2026 – present	0

== See also ==
- List of British heavyweight boxing champions
- List of British light-heavyweight boxing champions
- List of British super-middleweight boxing champions
- List of British middleweight boxing champions
- List of British light-middleweight boxing champions
- List of British welterweight boxing champions
- List of British lightweight boxing champions
- List of British super-featherweight boxing champions
- List of British featherweight boxing champions
- List of British super-bantamweight boxing champions
- List of British bantamweight boxing champions
- List of British super-flyweight boxing champions
- List of British flyweight boxing champions
- List of British world boxing champions
