= Johnny Nelson =

British boxer (born 1967)

Johnny Nelson MBE
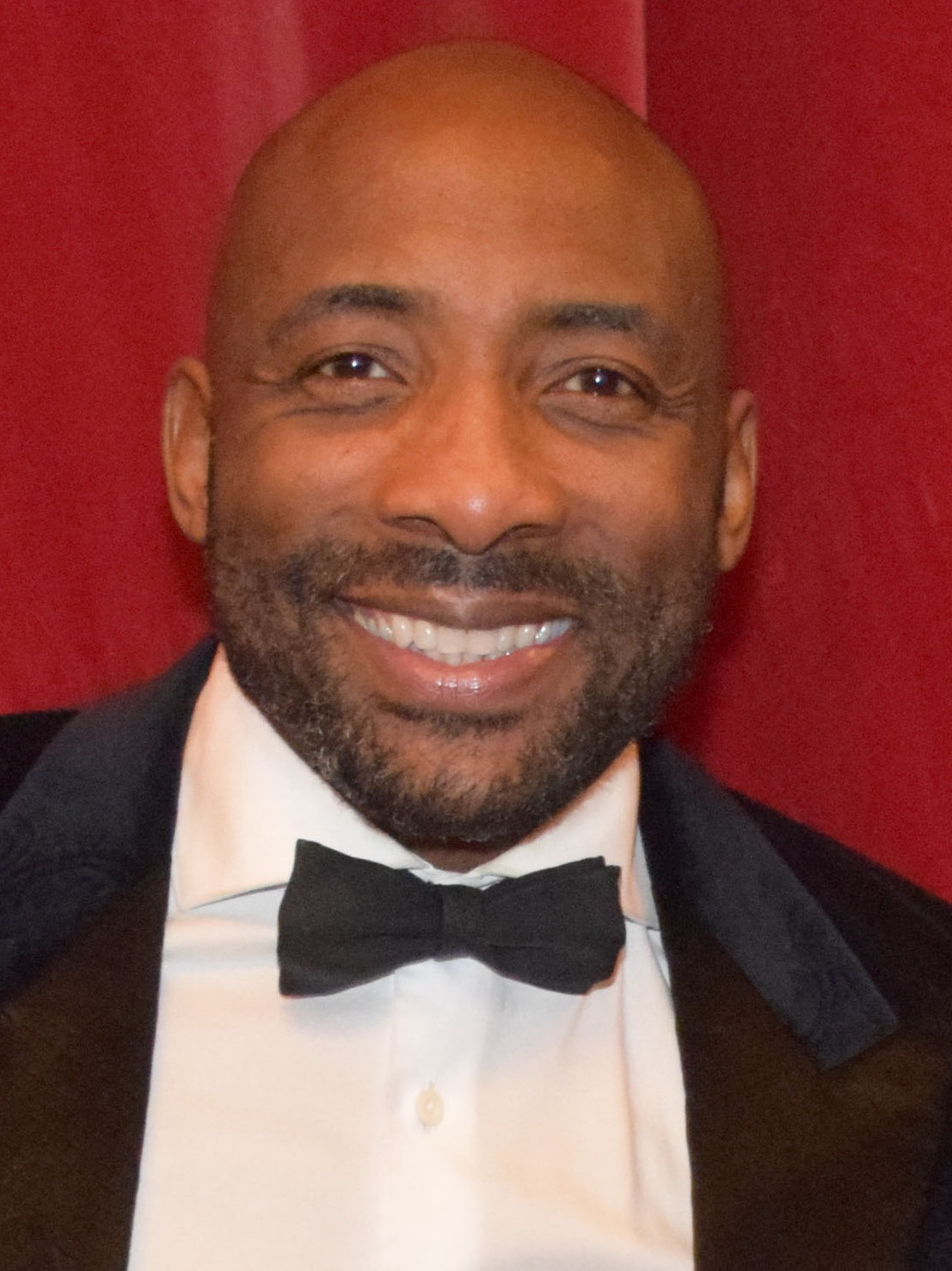
- Nelson in 2017

Personal information
- Nickname: The Entertainer
- Nationality: British
- Born: Ivanson Ranny Nelson; 4 January 1967 (age 59) Sheffield, West Riding of Yorkshire, England
- Height: 6 ft 2 1/2 in (189 cm)
- Weight: Cruiserweight; Heavyweight

Boxing career
- Reach: 81 in (206 cm)
- Stance: Orthodox

Boxing record
- Total fights: 59
- Wins: 45
- Win by KO: 29
- Losses: 12
- Draws: 2

Ivanson Ranny "Johnny" Nelson MBE (born 4 January 1967) is a British former professional boxer who competed from 1986 to 2005. He held the World Boxing Organization (WBO) cruiserweight title from 1999 to 2006, and remains the longest reigning cruiserweight world champion of all time. Nelson defended the title against thirteen different opponents, more than any other cruiserweight in history, and holds a joint-record of most consecutive cruiserweight title defences (along with Marco Huck). He also never lost the title in the ring. At regional level, he held the British cruiserweight title twice between 1989 and 1997, and the European cruiserweight title twice between 1990 and 1998.

== Professional career ==
Nelson began training at Wincobank gym in Sheffield under trainer Brendan Ingle who also went on to train Naseem Hamed and Kell Brook. He began his career losing ten of his thirteen bouts contested as an amateur.

Nelson's 15th defence of his WBO cruiserweight title was scheduled to be against Welshman Enzo Maccarinelli on the undercard for the Joe Calzaghe versus Jeff Lacy WBO/IBF unification bout on 6 March 2006, but a knee injury picked up by Nelson during sparring forced the fight to be cancelled and Nelson announced his decision to retire from professional boxing a few months later on 22 September 2006.

== Life after boxing ==
Nelson currently works as an analyst for Sky Sports. Since retirement he has spent some time working with the prison service helping inmates with life management skills. He has also done some charity work, agreeing to fight a charity match against Jos Battle.

Nelson was appointed Member of the Order of the British Empire (MBE) in the 2023 New Year Honours for services to boxing and to young people in South Yorkshire.

His likeness as well as commentary is featured in the 2024 video game Undisputed as a cruiserweight boxer. His voice was also featured in the 2024 documentary, Four Kings.

== Personal life ==
Nelson's mother was Cuban-Jamaican, his father was Dominican. Nelson's parents split up when he was a young child and he did not reunite with his biological father until he was in his thirties. In 2010, Nelson published his autobiography, Hard Road to Glory.

== Professional boxing record ==
59 fights	45 wins	12 losses
By knockout	29	1
By decision	16	10
By disqualification	0	1
Draws	2	

No.	Result	Record	Opponent	Type	Round, time	Date	Location	Notes
59	Win	45–12–2	Vincenzo Cantatore	SD	12	26 Nov 2005	Palazzetto dello Sport, Rome, Italy	Retained WBO cruiserweight title
58	Win	44–12–2	Rüdiger May	TKO	7 (12), 2:29	4 Sep 2004	Grugahalle, Essen, Germany	Retained WBO cruiserweight title
57	Win	43–12–2	Alexander Petkovic	MD	12	15 Nov 2003	Oberfrankenhalle, Bayreuth, Germany	Retained WBO cruiserweight title
56	Draw	42–12–2	Guillermo Jones	SD	12	23 Nov 2002	Storm Arena, Derby, England	Retained WBO cruiserweight title
55	Win	42–12–1	Ezra Sellers	KO	8 (12), 2:39	6 Apr 2002	Circus Building, Copenhagen, Denmark	Retained WBO cruiserweight title
54	Win	41–12–1	Alexander Vasiliev	UD	12	24 Nov 2001	York Hall, London, England	Won vacant WBU heavyweight title
53	Win	40–12–1	Marcelo Domínguez	UD	12	21 Jul 2001	Ponds Forge, Sheffield, England	Retained WBO cruiserweight title
52	Win	39–12–1	George Arias	UD	12	27 Jan 2001	York Hall, London, England	Retained WBO cruiserweight title
51	Win	38–12–1	Adam Watt	KO	5 (12), 2:12	7 Oct 2000	The Dome Leisure Centre, Doncaster, England	Retained WBO cruiserweight title
50	Win	37–12–1	Pietro Aurino	TKO	7 (12), 2:23	8 Apr 2000	York Hall, London, England	Retained WBO cruiserweight title
49	Win	36–12–1	Christophe Girard	KO	4 (12), 2:34	6 Nov 1999	Kingsway Leisure Centre, Widnes, England	Retained WBO cruiserweight title
48	Win	35–12–1	Sione Asipeli	UD	12	18 Sep 1999	Mandalay Bay Events Center, Paradise, Nevada, US	Retained WBO cruiserweight title
47	Win	34–12–1	Willard Lewis	TKO	4 (12), 3:00	7 Aug 1999	Goresbrook Leisure Centre, London, England	Retained WBO cruiserweight title
46	Win	33–12–1	Bruce Scott	UD	12	15 May 1999	Ponds Forge, Sheffield, England	Retained WBO cruiserweight title
45	Win	32–12–1	Carl Thompson	TKO	5 (12), 1:42	27 Mar 1999	Storm Arena, Derby, England	Won WBO cruiserweight title
44	Win	31–12–1	Peter Oboh	RTD	6 (8), 3:00	18 Jul 1998	Sheffield Arena, Sheffield, England	
43	Win	30–12–1	Dirk Wallyn	TKO	1 (12), 1:13	10 Nov 1997	Sheffield Arena, Sheffield, England	Retained European cruiserweight title
42	Win	29–12–1	Michael Murray	PTS	4	19 Jul 1997	Wembley Arena, London, England	
41	Win	28–12–1	Patrice Aouissi	KO	7 (12)	22 Feb 1997	Berck, France	Won vacant European cruiserweight title
40	Win	27–12–1	Dennis Andries	TKO	7 (12), 1:50	14 Dec 1996	Sheffield, England	Won vacant British cruiserweight title
39	Win	26–12–1	Tony Booth	KO	2 (6), 2:07	20 Jan 1996	Leisure Centre, Mansfield, England	
38	Loss	25–12–1	Adílson Rodrigues	UD	12	3 Dec 1995	Ginásio Carlos Nélson Bueno, Mogi Guaçu, Brazil	For WBF (Federation) heavyweight title
37	Loss	25–11–1	Adílson Rodrigues	PTS	12	22 Aug 1995	Osasco, Brazil	Lost WBF (Federation) heavyweight title
36	Win	25–10–1	Nikolay Kulpin	SD	12	5 Nov 1994	Chiangrai Stadium, Chiang Rai, Thailand	Retained WBF (Federation) heavyweight title
35	Loss	24–10–1	Henry Akinwande	PTS	10	4 May 1994	York Hall, London, England	
34	Win	24–9–1	Jimmy Thunder	UD	12	19 Nov 1993	Mount Smart Stadium, Auckland, New Zealand	Won WBF (Federation) heavyweight title
33	Loss	23–9–1	Franco Wanyama	DQ	10 (12)	10 Jan 1993	Waregem, Belgium	Lost WBF (Federation) cruiserweight title; Nelson disqualified for repeated fouls
32	Win	23–8–1	Tom Collins	TKO	1 (12)	4 Nov 1993	Leisure Centre, Mansfield, England	Retained WBF (Federation) cruiserweight title
31	Win	22–8–1	Dave Russell	TKO	11 (12)	30 Apr 1993	Festival Hall, Melbourne, Australia	Won WBF (Federation) cruiserweight title
30	Loss	21–8–1	Corrie Sanders	UD	10	24 Oct 1992	Morula Sun Casino, Mabopane, South Africa	
29	Loss	21–7–1	Norbert Ekassi	TKO	3 (8)	14 Aug 1992	Ajaccio, France	
28	Loss	21–6–1	James Warring	UD	12	16 May 1992	Hugo's Nightclub, Bealeton, Virginia, US	For IBF cruiserweight title
27	Win	21–5–1	Yves Monsieur	TKO	8 (12), 2:35	3 Dec 1991	Leisure Centre, Mansfield, England	Retained European cruiserweight title
26	Win	20–5–1	Markus Bott	TKO	12 (12)	14 Dec 1990	Europahalle, Karlsruhe, Germany	Won vacant European cruiserweight title
25	Win	19–5–1	Andre Smith	PTS	8	9 May 1990	Brighton Centre, Brighton, England	
24	Win	18–5–1	Arthur Weathers	TKO	2 (8), 0:25	27 Jun 1990	Royal Albert Hall, London, England	
23	Win	17–5–1	Lou Gent	KO	4 (12), 1:49	28 Mar 1990	York Hall, London, England	Retained British cruiserweight title
22	Win	16–5–1	Dino Homsey	TKO	7 (8)	14 Feb 1990	International Centre, Brentwood, England	
21	Draw	15–5–1	Carlos de León	SD	12	27 Jan 1990	City Hall, Sheffield, England	For WBC cruiserweight title
20	Win	15–5	Ian Bulloch	KO	2 (12)	10 Feb 1989	Victoria Hall, Hanley, England	Retained British cruiserweight title
19	Win	14–5	Andy Straughn	TKO	8 (12)	21 May 1989	Finsbury Park Majestic Ballroom, London, England	Won British cruiserweight title
18	Win	13–5	Steve Mormino	TKO	2 (8), 1:56	4 Apr 1989	City Hall, Sheffield, England	
17	Win	12–5	Danny Lawford	TKO	2 (10), 0:53	26 Oct 1988	City Hall, Sheffield, England	Won vacant Central Area cruiserweight title
16	Win	11–5	Andrew Gerrard	PTS	8	31 Aug 1988	Kings Hall, Stoke-on-Trent, England	
15	Win	10–5	Lennie Howard	KO	2 (8)	6 Jun 1988	Hilton, London, England	
14	Win	9–5	Crawford Ashley	PTS	8	5 Apr 1988	Midlands Sporting Club, Solihull, England	
13	Win	8–5	Kenny Jones	KO	1 (8), 1:40	25 Apr 1988	Montrose Club, Liverpool, England	
12	Win	7–5	Cordwell Hylton	KO	1 (8)	24 Feb 1988	City Hall, Sheffield, England	
11	Loss	6–5	Dennis Bailey	PTS	8	2 Jan 1988	Derngate Theatre, Northampton, England	
10	Win	6–4	Jon McBean	TKO	6 (8)	14 Dec 1987	The Tower Ballroom, Birmingham, England	
9	Win	5–4	Byron Pullen	TKO	3 (8)	6 Mar 1987	Elephant and Castle Shopping Centre, London, England	
8	Loss	4–4	Brian Schumacher	PTS	8	28 Apr 1987	North Bridge Leisure Centre, Halifax, England	
7	Win	4–3	Sean Daly	TKO	1 (8), 0:52	4 Oct 1987	The Ritz, Manchester, England	
6	Win	3–3	Doug Young	PTS	6	3 Feb 1987	Ladbroke Mercury Hotel, Huddersfield, England	
5	Win	2–3	George Carmen	PTS	6	19 Jan 1987	Grosvenor House Hotel, London, England	
4	Win	1–3	Chris Little	PTS	6	20 Nov 1986	Quaffers Club, Bredbury, England	
3	Loss	0–3	Magne Havnaa	PTS	4	3 Oct 1986	Idrætshuset, Copenhagen, Denmark	
2	Loss	0–2	Tommy Taylor	PTS	6	15 May 1986	Brierley Hill Civic Hall, Dudley, England	
1	Loss	0–1	Peter Brown	PTS	6	18 Mar 1986	Westfield Country Club, Hull, England	

Sporting positions
Regional boxing titles
Vacant Title last held by Joe Threlfall	British Central Area cruiserweight champion 26 October 1988 – 21 May 1989; Won full title	Vacant Title next held by Tony Booth
Preceded by Andy Straughn	British cruiserweight champion 21 May 1989 – December 1990; Vacated	Vacant Title next held by Derek Angol
Vacant Title last held by Anaclet Wamba	European cruiserweight champion 14 December 1990 – May 1992; Vacated	Vacant Title next held by Akim Tafer
Vacant Title last held by Terry Dunstan	British cruiserweight champion 14 December 1996 – November 1998; Vacated	Vacant Title next held by Bruce Scott
Vacant Title last held by Akim Tafer	European cruiserweight champion 22 February 1997 – February 1998; Vacated	Vacant Title next held by Terry Dunstan
Minor world boxing titles
Preceded by Dave Russell	WBF (Federation) cruiserweight champion 30 April 1993 – 1 October 1993	Succeeded by Franco Wanyama
Preceded by Jimmy Thunder	WBF (Federation) heavyweight champion 19 November 1993 – 22 August 1995	Succeeded by Adílson Rodrigues
Vacant Title last held by Hasim Rahman	WBU heavyweight champion 24 November 2001 – April 2002; Vacated	Vacant Title next held by Georgi Kandelaki
Major world boxing titles
Preceded by Carl Thompson	WBO cruiserweight champion 27 March 1999 – July 2006; Stripped	Vacant Title next held by Enzo Maccarinelli
