= Jeff Lampkin =

American boxer

Personal information
- Nickname: Prime time
- Born: Jeff Lampkin; September 21, 1961 (age 64) Youngstown, Ohio, US
- Height: 6 ft 1 in (185 cm)
- Weight: Light heavyweight; Cruiserweight; Heavyweight

Boxing career
- Stance: Orthodox

Boxing record
- Total fights: 59
- Wins: 39
- Win by KO: 34
- Losses: 19
- Draws: 1

Jeff Lampkin (born September 21, 1961) is an American former professional boxer. Lampkin won the USBA cruiserweight title and IBF cruiserweight belt.

== Personal life ==
Jeff Lampkin was born September 21, 1961, in Youngstown, Ohio

Despite Lampkins' accomplishments, his economic rewards were relatively modest. Contracts he signed left the fighter with little more than $50,000, even though he won and defended a cruiserweight world champion title. The former champion indicated that frustration over the apparent mishandling of his career contributed to his decision to vacate the title. Today, Lampkin lives and works in Youngstown.

== Amateur career ==
Lampkin had a stellar amateur career, winning the National AAU Light Heavyweight Championship in 1980. He became a professional later that year. On June 11, 1982, Lampkin, along with Earnie Shavers, had an undercard spot on the Larry Holmes-Gerry Cooney fight.

== Professional career ==
Lamkin debuted in professional boxing in 1980. Lampkin won 16 straight fights until his first defeat to Willie Edwards in 1982. Lamkin won the IBF USBA cruiserweight title in 1988 with a 5th round TKO over Alonso Ratliff. Lampkin challenged Glenn McCrory for the IBF cruiserweight title in 1990, and defeated McCrory via TKO in the 3rd round.

In 1991, Lampkin vacated his IBF cruiserweight title. He only defended his title once over a victory against Siza Makathini. The decision came over controversy surrounding his participation in an IBF bout in South Africa, as a result, the WBA and WBC witheld recognition of his title.

The IBF's subsequent failure to offer Lampkin a fight led him to request a purse offer in the summer of 1991. When IBF President Bobby Lee offered Lampkin a fight just three weeks before the bout was scheduled, a move that denied him adequate training time, the boxer concluded that the IBF had no intention of allowing him to defend his title. After vacating his title, Lampkins never challenged for a major belt again.

== Professional boxing record ==
59 fights	39 wins	19 losses
By knockout	34	2
By decision	5	17
Draws	1	

No.	Result	Record	Opponent	Type	Round, time	Date	Location	Notes
59	Win	39-19-1	(United States) Exum Speight	TKO	4	27/06/1997	(United States) Liberty, Ohio, U.S.	
58	Loss	38-19-1	(Denmark) Brian Nielsen	UD	8	13/01/1995	Aalborghallen, Denmark	
57	Loss	38-18-1	(Poland) Andrew Golota	RTD	1	13/08/1994	(United States) Aladdin, Nevada, U.S.	
56	Win	38-17-1	(Canada) Danny Stonewalker	KO	3	24/05/1994	Salta, Argentina	
55	Loss	37-17-1	(Canada) Tom Glesby	UD	10	22/03/1994	Edmonton, Alberta, Canada	
54	Loss	37-16-1	(United Kingdom) Herbie Hide	TKO	2	04/12/1993	Sun City, Bophuthatswana	WBC International Heavyweight Title.
53	Loss	37-15-1	(United States) Arthur Williams	UD	10	08/06/1993	(United States) Riviera, Las Vegas, Nevada, U.S.	
52	Loss	37-14-1	(Argentina) Marcelo Victor Figueroa	MD	10	03/10/1992	Cirque d'hiver, France	
51	Win	37-13-1	(United States) Fred Adams	KO	7	05/09/1992	Paris, France	
50	Win	36-13-1	(United States) Larry Davis	KO	1	29/05/1992	(United States) Youngstown, Ohio, U.S.	
49	Win	35-13-1	(South Africa) Siza Makathini	KO	8	28/07/1990	(United States) Saint Petersburg, Florida, U.S.	Retained IBF cruiserweight title
48	Win	34-13-1	(United Kingdom) Glenn McCrory	KO	3	22/03/1990	(United Kingdom) Gateshead Leisure Centre, Gateshead, England	Won IBF cruiserweight title
47	Win	33-13-1	(United States) Ed Smith	TKO	9	19/10/1989	(United States) Trump Plaza Hotel and Casino, New Jersey, U.S.	
46	Win	32-13-1	(United States) Elvis Parks	KO	1	12/05/1989	(United States) Struthers Fieldhouse, Ohio, U.S.	
45	Win	31-13-1	(United States) Wali Muhammad	TKO	12	14/02/1989	(United States) Showboat, Atlantic City, New Jersey, U.S.	IBF USBA Cruiserweight Title.
44	Win	30-13-1	(United States) Alfonso Ratliff	TKO	5	17/11/1988	(United States) Showboat, Atlantic City, New Jersey, U.S.	IBF USBA Cruiserweight Title.
43	Win	29-13-1	(South Africa) Freddie Rafferty	KO	6	02/07/1988	Sun City, Bophuthatswana	
42	Loss	28-13-1	(Kenya) Patrick Lumumba	PTS	8	09/04/1988	(United States) Caesars Palace, Nevada, U.S.	
41	Loss	28-12-1	(Zambia) Lottie Mwale	PTS	10	05/12/1987	Philips Halle, Germany	
40	Loss	28-11-1	(United States) Sherman Griffin	SD	12	23/06/1987	(United States) Houston, Texas, U.S.	IBF USBA Cruiserweight Title.
39	Loss	28-10-1	(Jordan) Ramzi Hassan	UD	10	23/02/1987	(United States) The Forum, Inglewood, California, U.S.	
38	Win	28-9-1	(United States) Jesse Shelby	SD	10	22/01/1987	(United States) The Forum, Inglewood, California, U.S.	
37	Win	27-9-1	(United States) Paul Madison	KO	5	11/09/1986	(United States) The Forum, Inglewood, California, U.S.	
36	Win	26-9-1	(United States) Danny Blake	UD	8	11/03/1986	(United States) Niles, Ohio, U.S.	
35	Win	25-9-1	(United States) Tim Broady	TKO	7	24/01/1986	(United States) Trump Plaza Hotel and Casino, New Jersey, U.S.	
34	Loss	24-9-1	(United States) Charles Williams	PTS	10	03/12/1985	(United States) Sands Atlantic City, New Jersey, U.S.	
33	Loss	24-8-1	(Canada) Cedric Parsons	SD	8	06/08/1985	(United States) Atlantic City, New Jersey, U.S.	
32	Win	24-7-1	(United States) Jack Johnson	UD	10	11/06/1985	(United States) Tropicana Casino & Resort Atlantic City, New Jersey, U.S.	
31	Loss	23-7-1	(United States) Jerome Clouden	PTS	10	20/11/1984	(United States) Jefferson City, Missouri, U.S.	
30	Draw	23-6-1	(Zambia) Chisanda Mutti	PTS	10	26/05/1984	Düsseldorf, Germany	
29	Win	23-6	(United States) Willie Crawford	KO	4	06/03/1984	(United States) Niles, Ohio, U.S.	
28	Win	22-6	(United States) Arthel Lawhorne	TKO	6	24/01/1984	(United States) Niles, Ohio, U.S.	
27	Loss	21-6	(United States) Anthony Witherspoon	PTS	10	11/01/1984	(United States) Atlantic City, New Jersey, U.S.	
26	Loss	21-5	(Venezuela) Fulgencio Obelmejias	PTS	8	14/12/1983	Loano, Italy	
25	Loss	21-4	(United States) Johnny Davis	UD	10	12/07/1983	(United States) Tropicana Casino & Resort Atlantic City, New Jersey, U.S.	
24	Win	21-3	(United States) Stanley Ross	KO	1	14/06/1983	(United States) Tropicana Casino & Resort Atlantic City, New Jersey, U.S.	
23	Loss	20-3	(United States) Richie Kates	PTS	10	13/04/1983	(United States) Resorts Casino Hotel, New Jersey, U.S.	
22	Win	20-2	(United States) Rodney Green	UD	10	07/03/1983	(United States) Chicago, Illinois, U.S.	
21	Win	19-2	(Dominican Republic) Leonardo Rodgers	TKO	3	22/01/1983	(United States) Atlantic City, New Jersey, U.S.	
20	Win	18-2	(United States) Frank Payne	TKO	3	30/12/1982	(United States) Pittsburgh, Pennsylvania, U.S.	
19	Loss	17-2	(United States) Willie Stallings	PTS	10	30/11/1982	(United States) Atlantic City, New Jersey, U.S.	
18	Win	17-1	(United States) Al Bolden	MD	10	27/08/1982	(United States) Civic Arena, Pittsburgh, Pennsylvania, U.S.	
17	Loss	16-1	(United States) Willie Edwards	UD	10	11/06/1982	(United States) Caesars Palace, Nevada, U.S.	
16	Win	16-0	(United States) Fred Brown	TKO	5	28/04/1982	(United States) Struthers Fieldhouse, Ohio, U.S.	
15	Win	15-0	(United States) Michael Hardin	TKO	6	17/03/1982	(United States) Niles, Ohio, U.S.	
14	Win	14-0	(United States) Phil Brown	KO	4	22/02/1982	(United States) Niles, Ohio, U.S.	
13	Win	13-0	(United States) Charles Williams	TKO	6	29/10/1981	(United States) Warren, Ohio, U.S.	
12	Win	12-0	(United States) Darnell Hayes	KO	2	15/08/1981	(United States) Gannon College Auditorium, Pennsylvania, U.S.	
11	Win	11-0	(United States) Sylvester Wilder	TKO	1	19/07/1981	(United States) Warren, Ohio, U.S.	
10	Win	10-0	(United States) Ernie Whitmore	KO	3	28/06/1981	(United States) Canton Memorial Civic Center, Ohio, U.S.	
9	Win	9-0	(United States) Darnell Hayes	KO	2	17/03/1981	(United States) Niles, Ohio, U.S.	
8	Win	8-0	(Canada) Randy Jackson	KO	1	20/01/1981	(United States) Niles, Ohio, U.S.	
7	Win	7-0	(United States) Stanley Scott	TKO	3	16/12/1980	(United States) Cleveland, Ohio, U.S.	
6	Win	6–0	(United States) Willie Crawford	TKO	4	09/12/1980	(United States) Warren, Ohio, U.S.	
5	Win	5-0	(United States) Eddie Temple	TKO	1	28/10/1980	(United States) Warren, Ohio, U.S.	
4	Win	4-0	(United States) Earl Caldwell	KO	1	24/09/1980	(United States) Struthers Fieldhouse, Ohio, U.S.	
3	Win	3–0	(Canada) Wes Rowe	TKO	3	09/09/1980	(United States) Warren, Ohio, U.S.	
2	Win	2–0	(United States) John Beveridge	KO	1	20/08/1980	(United States) Warren, Ohio, U.S.	
1	Win	1–0	(United States) Jim Hearn	TKO	1	18/06/1980	(United States) Struthers Fieldhouse, Ohio, U.S.	

== See also ==
- List of world cruiserweight boxing champions

Sporting positions
Amateur boxing titles
Previous: Tony Tucker	U.S. light heavyweight champion 1980	Next: Alex DeLucia
Regional boxing titles
Preceded by Alfonso Ratliff	USBA Cruiserweight Title; November 17, 1988 – March 22, 1990; Won world title	Vacant Title next held by Al Cole
World boxing titles
Preceded by Glenn McCrory	IBF Cruiserweight champion March 22, 1990 – July, 1991; Vacated	Vacant Title next held by James Warring
