= Carl Thompson (boxer) =

British boxer (born 1964)

Personal information
- Nickname: The Cat
- Born: Adrian Carl Thompson; 26 May 1964 (age 62) Manchester, England
- Height: 6 ft 0 in (183 cm)
- Weight: Light-heavyweight; Cruiserweight

Boxing career
- Reach: 75 in (191 cm)
- Stance: Orthodox

Boxing record
- Total fights: 40
- Wins: 34
- Win by KO: 25
- Losses: 6

Adrian Carl Thompson (born 26 May 1964) is a British former professional boxer who competed from 1988 to 2005. He held multiple championships at cruiserweight, including the WBO title between 1997 and 1999, and the IBO title twice between 2001 and 2005. Additionally, he held the British title in 1992 and 1999, and the European title in 1994 and 2000. He is also a former Muay Thai fighter, who fought in 1987 and 1989 for World Titles.

== Professional career ==
=== Early years ===
Nicknamed "The Cat", Thompson turned professional boxer in 1988. He went 8–0 before losing to Crawford Ashley by TKO in round 6 for the British Central Area light heavyweight title after taking a thumb to the eye. In 1990 he was outpointed by Franco Wanyama, and in 1991 he was KOd by Yawe Davis. However, his punching power in his right hand brought him to contention, stopping the undefeated Nicky Piper in three rounds.

Thompson won the vacant British cruiserweight title by beating Steve Lewsam in eight rounds in June 1992, then in his next fight won the WBC International title in two rounds against Arthur 'Stormy' Weathers at York Hall, Bethnal Green, London in February 1993.

In February 1994, Thompson traveled to Ferrara, Emilia Romagna, Italy and won the European title by defeating Massimiliano Duran by KO in eight rounds, and in his next bout knocked out France's Akim Tafer in six rounds at Epernay, Marne, France to retain his European title.

After winning two mark-time fights, Thompson was matched against Ralf Rocchigiani in a bout for the vacant WBO cruiserweight title at the G-Mex Leisure Centre, Manchester in June 1995. Both fighters were knocked down in round five, and Thompson lost during round eleven after dislocating his shoulder.

=== WBO cruiserweight champion ===
After returning with three wins, Thompson won the WBO cruiserweight title via decision over Ralf Rocchigiani in a rematch in Stadionsporthalle, Hannover, Niedersachsen, Germany in October 1997. He defended the belt twice, beating the smaller Chris Eubank in 1998 before losing it via a controversial referee stoppage to Johnny Nelson in 1999.

Thompson regained the vacant British title with a twelfth round knockout of Terry Dunstan in December 1999, then regained the vacant European title with a sixth round stoppage of Alain Simon.

Thompson's winning streak ended in a fourth round knockout defeat to Ezra Sellers in 2001.

=== Thompson vs. Rothman ===
After three low-key wins, Thompson met South African, Sebastian Rothman. Thompson had been on the end of beating for most of the bout. The BBC commentators on the night, Jim Neilly and Colin McMillan, were calling for Carl's retirement, saying he was finished, taking the beating needlessly, and that the fight should have been stopped.

Rothman forced Thompson on to the ropes during the ninth round and the referee looked at Thompson ready to stop the fight. Somehow Thompson got away from the ropes and forced Rothman into the middle of the ring. With 17 seconds remaining in the round, Rothman dropped his left hand for what seemed like a fraction of a second, allowing Carl to deliver a flush right hand to the South African's head knocking him to the canvas.

Rothman bravely tried to get back on his feet but his legs had gone and the referee had no option but to stop the fight, handing Thompson a famous victory.

=== Thompson vs. Haye ===
In September 2004 at 40 years of age, Thompson boxed the up-and-coming 23 year old David Haye in a classic 'youth vs experience' matchup. Haye started fast and caught Thompson with constant barrages of power punches, coming close to forcing a stoppage at numerous points over the first few rounds.

Gradually, despite the early punishment he received, Thompson warmed up and worked his way into the fight whilst Haye seemed to tire and slow down. Thompson began to pressure Haye and knocked Haye down with a chopping right hand in round five. With seven seconds left in the round, Thompson landed two jabs followed by a flush right hand which rocked a fatigued Haye, and compelled Haye's corner to throw in the towel.

Thompson retired at the end of 2005 after a points win over Frederic Serrat.

== Professional boxing record ==
40 fights	34 wins	6 losses
By knockout	25	5
By decision	9	1

No.	Result	Record	Opponent	Type	Round, time	Date	Location	Notes
40	Win	34–6	Frédéric Serrat	PTS	10	26 Nov 2005	Hallam FM Arena, Sheffield, England	
39	Win	33–6	David Haye	TKO	5 (12), 2:53	10 Sep 2004	Wembley Arena, London, England	Retained IBO cruiserweight title
38	Win	32–6	Sebastiaan Rothmann	TKO	9 (12), 2:57	6 Feb 2004	Ponds Forge, Sheffield, England	Won IBO cruiserweight title
37	Win	31–6	Paul Bonson	PTS	6	7 Nov 2003	Hillsborough Leisure Centre, Sheffield, England	
36	Win	30–6	Hastings Rasani	KO	1 (6), 2:01	5 Sep 2003	Ponds Forge, Sheffield, England	
35	Win	29–6	Phil Day	KO	4 (6), 0:35	10 Jun 2003	Ponds Forge, Sheffield, England	
34	Loss	28–6	Ezra Sellers	KO	4 (12), 1:36	26 Nov 2001	Wythenshawe Forum, Manchester, England	Lost IBO cruiserweight title
33	Win	28–5	Uriah Grant	TKO	5 (12), 2:20	3 Feb 2001	Bowlers Exhibition Centre, Manchester, England	Won IBO cruiserweight title
32	Win	27–5	Alexey Ilyin	TKO	2 (12)	25 Sep 2000	Metrodome, Barnsley, England	Retained European cruiserweight title
31	Win	26–5	Alain Simon	TKO	6 (12), 2:25	13 May 2000	Metrodome, Barnsley, England	Won vacant European cruiserweight title
30	Win	25–5	Terry Dunstan	KO	12 (12), 2:40	3 Dec 1999	Bushfield Leisure Centre, Peterborough, England	Won vacant British cruiserweight title
29	Loss	24–5	Johnny Nelson	TKO	5 (12), 1:42	27 Mar 1999	Storm Arena, Derby, England	Lost WBO cruiserweight title
28	Win	24–4	Chris Eubank	RTD	9 (12), 3:00	18 Jul 1998	Sheffield Arena, Sheffield, England	Retained WBO cruiserweight title
27	Win	23–4	Chris Eubank	UD	12	18 Apr 1998	NYNEX Arena, Manchester, England	Retained WBO cruiserweight title
26	Win	22–4	Ralf Rocchigiani	SD	12	4 Oct 1997	Stadionsporthalle, Hanover, Germany	Won WBO cruiserweight title
25	Win	21–4	Keith McMurray	TKO	4 (8)	26 Apr 1997	Hallenstadion, Zürich, Switzerland	
24	Win	20–4	Jason Nicholson	PTS	8	9 Nov 1996	NYNEX Arena, Manchester, England	
23	Win	19–4	Albert Call	TKO	5 (8)	13 Apr 1996	Wythenshawe Forum, Manchester, England	
22	Loss	18–4	Ralf Rocchigiani	TKO	11 (12), 0:38	10 Jun 1995	G-Mex Centre, Manchester, England	For vacant WBO cruiserweight title
21	Win	18–3	Tim Knight	KO	5 (8)	13 Oct 1994	Palais des sports Marcel-Cerdan, Levallois-Perret, France	
20	Win	17–3	Dionisio Lazario Nascimento	TKO	1 (6), 1:06	10 Sep 1994	National Exhibition Centre, Birmingham, England	
19	Win	16–3	Akim Tafer	TKO	6 (12)	14 Jun 1994	Épernay, France	Retained European cruiserweight title
18	Win	15–3	Massimiliano Duran	KO	8 (12)	2 Feb 1994	Ferrara, Italy	Won European cruiserweight title
17	Win	14–3	Willie Jake	KO	3 (8)	25 Jul 1993	Oldham, England	
16	Win	13–3	Steve Harvey	KO	1 (8)	31 Mar 1993	York Hall, London, England	
15	Win	12–3	Arthur Weathers	KO	2 (12)	17 Feb 1993	York Hall, London, England	Won vacant WBC International cruiserweight title
14	Win	11–3	Steve Lewsam	TKO	8 (12)	4 Jun 1992	Cleethorpes, England	Won vacant British cruiserweight title
13	Win	10–3	Nicky Piper	TKO	3 (8)	4 Sep 1991	York Hall, London, England	
12	Loss	9–3	Yawe Davis	TKO	2 (8)	1 Apr 1991	Stade Louis II, Monte Carlo, Monaco	
11	Win	9–2	Terry Dixon	PTS	8	7 Mar 1991	Festival Hall, Basildon, England	
10	Loss	8–2	Franco Wanyama	PTS	6	21 Apr 1990	Sint-Amandsberg, Belgium	
9	Loss	8–1	Crawford Ashley	TKO	6 (10)	31 Oct 1989	Bowlers Exhibition Centre, Manchester, England	For vacant Central Area light-heavyweight title
8	Win	8–0	Peter Brown	KO	5 (8)	11 Jul 1989	Variety Club, Batley, England	
7	Win	7–0	Steve Osborne	PTS	8	12 Jun 1989	Free Trade Hall, Manchester, England	
6	Win	6–0	Tenko Ernie	KO	4 (6)	4 May 1989	Hilton, London, England	
5	Win	5–0	Keith Halliwell	TKO	1 (6), 1:04	4 Apr 1989	Piccadilly Hotel, Manchester, England	
4	Win	4–0	Sean O'Phoenix	TKO	4 (6)	7 Mar 1989	Piccadilly Hotel, Manchester, England	
3	Win	3–0	Steve Osborne	PTS	6	13 Feb 1989	Piccadilly Hotel, Manchester, England	
2	Win	2–0	Paul Sheldon	PTS	6	11 Oct 1988	South Staffs Sporting Club, Wolverhampton, England	
1	Win	1–0	Darren McKenna	TKO	2 (6)	6 Jun 1988	Free Trade Hall, Manchester, England	

Sporting positions
Regional boxing titles
Vacant Title last held by Derek Angol	British cruiserweight champion 4 June 1992 – February 1994; Vacated	Vacant Title next held by Dennis Andries
Vacant Title last held by Andrey Rudenko	WBC International cruiserweight champion 17 February 1993 – February 1994; Vacated	Vacant Title next held by Przemysław Saleta
Preceded by Massimiliano Duran	European cruiserweight champion 2 February 1994 – January 1995; Vacated	Vacant Title next held by Alexander Gurov
Vacant Title last held by Bruce Scott	British cruiserweight champion 3 December 1999 – December 2000; Vacated	Vacant Title next held by Bruce Scott
Vacant Title last held by Torsten May	European cruiserweight champion 13 May 2000 – February 2001; Vacated	Vacant Title next held by Alexander Gurov
Minor world boxing titles
Preceded by Uriah Grant	IBO cruiserweight champion 3 February 2001 – 26 November 2001	Vacant Title next held by Ezra Sellers
Preceded by Sebastiaan Rothmann	IBO cruiserweight champion 6 February 2004 – November 2005; Vacated	Vacant Title next held by Tomasz Adamek
Major world boxing titles
Preceded by Ralf Rocchigiani	WBO cruiserweight champion 4 October 1997 – 27 March 1999	Vacant Title next held by Johnny Nelson
