= Massimiliano Duran =

Italian boxer

Personal information
- Nickname: Momo
- Nationality: Italian
- Born: Massimiliano Duran; 3 November 1963 (age 62) Ferrara, Emilia Romagna, Italy
- Height: 6 ft 1 1/2 in (187 cm)
- Weight: Cruiserweight

Boxing career
- Stance: Orthodox

Boxing record
- Total fights: 25
- Wins: 19
- Win by KO: 8
- Losses: 6

Massimiliano Duran (born 3 November 1963) is an Italian former professional boxer who competed from 1986 to 1994. He held the WBC cruiserweight title from 1990 to 1991 and the European cruiserweight title from 1993 to 1994. He is also known for being the only fighter in boxing history to earn a shot at, win, and defend a world title with three consecutive disqualification wins.

== Professional career ==
Duran was born in Ferrara. His father was the Argentine-Italian boxer Juan Carlos Duran; his brother, the Italian boxer Alessandro Duran. Duran turned pro in 1986 when he defeated Momo Cupelic. The win earned him the nickname "Momo". Duran's first defeat came at the hands of Ndomingiedi Lusikina. This bout began a long-standing rivalry that resulted in the two boxers fighting each other five times as professionals.

In 1990 Duran won the WBC cruiserweight title by defeating Carlos De León, when De León was disqualified for hitting after the bell at the end of the 11th round. Duran was leading on the cards.

His first title defence was against Anaclet Wamba. Duran won by disqualification after Wamba had been penalized a total of five points. Duran lost a rematch the following year by 11th round technical knockout. and the rubber match by knockout.

In 1993 Duran beat Derek Angol by KO for the vacant European crown but subsequently lost the title by stoppage to Carl Thompson. Duran suffered permanent damages to his left eye in a match with Alexey Ilyin and retired shortly after.

Following his retirement, Duran worked as a boxing trainer in his gym “Pugilistica Padana Vigor” in Ferrara.

== Professional boxing record ==
25 fights	19 wins	6 losses
By knockout	8	5
By decision	8	0
By disqualification	3	1

No.	Result	Record	Opponent	Type	Round, time	Date	Location	Notes
25	Loss	19–6	(Russia) Alexey Ilyin	TKO	4	02/11/1994	Palasport, Rome, Italy	
24	Loss	19–5	(United Kingdom) Carl Thompson	KO	8	02/02/1994	Palasport, Ferrara, Italy	Lost European cruiserweight title
23	Win	19–4	(United Kingdom) Derek Angol	KO	11	22/06/1993	Ferrara, Italy	Won vacant European cruiserweight title
22	Win	18–4	(United States) Roy Bedwell	TKO	2	18/12/1992	Sora, Italy	
21	Win	17–4	(United States) Tim Knight	PTS	6	25/06/1992	Acquaflash di Licola, Licola, Italy	
20	Loss	16–4	(France) Anaclet Wamba	TKO	11	13/12/1991	Palais Omnisport de Paris-Bercy, Paris, France	For WBC cruiserweight title
19	Win	16–3	(United States) Rick Enis	PTS	8	09/11/1991	Casinò di Campione, Campione d'Italia, Italy	
18	Loss	15–3	(France) Anaclet Wamba	TKO	11	20/07/1991	Stadio delle Palme, Palermo, Italy	Lost WBC cruiserweight title
17	Win	15–2	(France) Anaclet Wamba	DQ	12	08/12/1990	Palazzo Dello Sport, Ferrara, Italy	Retained WBC cruiserweight title
16	Win	14–2	(Puerto Rico) Carlos De León	DQ	11	27/07/1990	Outdoor Arena, Capo d'Orlando, Italy	Won WBC cruiserweight title
15	Win	13–2	(Belgium) Yves Monsieur	DQ	7	23/02/1990	Ferrara, Italy	
14	Win	12–2	(Switzerland) Alfredo Cacciatore	TKO	10	04/11/1989	Ferrara, Italy	Won Italy cruiserweight title
13	Win	11–2	(Belgium) Yves Monsieur	PTS	8	07/07/1989	San Giuseppe Vesuviano, Italy	
12	Win	10–2	(United Kingdom) Jonjo Greene	KO	6	27/01/1989	Bergamo, Italy	
11	Win	9–2	(Democratic Republic of the Congo) Ndomingiedi Lusikina	KO	6	27/01/1989	San Pellegrino Terme, Italy	
10	Win	8–2	(Italy) Boubacar Batere	TKO	1	20/12/1988	San Pellegrino, Abruzzo, Italy	
9	Win	7–2	(Democratic Republic of the Congo) Konga Wa Konga	PTS	6	16/11/1988	Salerno, Italy	
8	Win	6–2	(Uganda) Peter Mulindwa Kozza	PTS	6	02/07/1988	Arezzo, Italy	
7	Win	5–2	(France) Oliver Kemayou	PTS	6	29/04/1988	Ferrara, Italy	
6	Win	4–2	(Democratic Republic of the Congo) Ndomingiedi Lusikina	PTS	6	03/12/1987	Ferrara, Italy	
5	Loss	3–2	(Italy) Giovanni Marchesini	DQ	5	06/11/1987	Merano, Italy	
4	Win	3–1	(Bosnia and Herzegovina) Mladen Frljic	TKO	3	07/08/1987	Comacchio, Italy	
3	Loss	2–1	(Democratic Republic of the Congo) Ndomingiedi Lusikina	KO	2	21/03/1987	Imola, Italy	
2	Win	2–0	(Democratic Republic of the Congo) Ndomingiedi Lusikina	PTS	6	15/12/1986	Bologna, Italy	
1	Win	1–0	(Slovenia) Momo Cupelic	KO	4	23/05/1986	Ferrara, Italy	

== See also ==
- List of world cruiserweight boxing champions

Sporting positions
Regional boxing titles
Vacant Title last held by Akim Tafer	European cruiserweight champion 22 June 1993 – 2 February 1994	Succeeded by Carl Thompson
World boxing titles
Preceded by Carlos De León	WBC cruiserweight champion 27 July 1990 – 20 July 1991	Succeeded by Anaclet Wamba
