= Andy Straughn =

British boxer

Personal information
- Nationality: British
- Born: Andrew McDonald Straughn; 25 December 1959 (age 66) Barbados
- Height: 6 ft 1 in (1.85 m)
- Weight: Cruiserweight

Boxing career

Boxing record
- Total fights: 27
- Wins: 18
- Win by KO: 10
- Losses: 7
- Draws: 2

Andrew McDonald "Andy" Straughn (born 25 December 1959) is a British former boxer who won three consecutive ABA titles, represented the UK at the 1980 Summer Olympics and went on to a professional career which included winning the British cruiserweight title.

== Amateur career ==
Born in Barbados in 1959, Straughn moved to England with his family when he was 10. He learned to box at the Hitchin Youth Amateur Boxing Club and went on to a successful career as an amateur, which included winning ABA light-heavyweight titles in 1979, 1980, and 1981, and representing the UK at the 1980 Summer Olympics in Moscow.

== 1980 Olympic results ==
Below is the record of Andy Straughn, a British light heavyweight boxer who competed at the 1980 Moscow Olympics:

- Round of 16: lost to David Kvachadze (Soviet Union) referee stopped contest

== Professional career ==
He turned professional in 1982 and won seven of his first eight fights, the other a draw with Ian Lazarus. He travelled to the United States in 1984 where he suffered his first defeats, to Arthel Lawhorne and Tim Bullock. Back in the UK he was unbeaten in his next eight fights, leading to a fight against Tee Jay in October 1986 for the British cruiserweight title vacated by Sammy Reeson. Straughn won narrowly on points to become British champion. His first defence came in February 1987 against Roy Smith, with Smith taking the title on points. Straughn then fought Glenn McCrory in an eliminator for the title, losing after a cut eye forced a stoppage in the tenth round. When McCrory vacated the title, Straughn was again matched with Tee Jay and took a points decision to become British champion for a second time in November 1988. This time his first defence was against Johnny Nelson and again Straughn lost the title, Nelson stopping him in the eighth round in May 1989. In March 1990 Straughn challenged Derek Angol for the Commonwealth cruiserweight title at the Royal Albert Hall; Angol stopped Straughn in the eighth round. This proved to be Straughn's final fight.
