= Glenn McCrory =

Irish boxer

Personal information
- Nickname: "Gentleman"
- Nationality: British
- Born: 23 September 1964 (age 61) Annfield Plain, County Durham, England
- Height: 6 ft 4 in (1.93 m)
- Weight: Cruiserweight; Heavyweight

Boxing career
- Stance: Orthodox

Boxing record
- Total fights: 39
- Wins: 30
- Win by KO: 12
- Losses: 8
- Draws: 1

Glenn George McCrory (born 23 September 1964) is a British former professional boxer who competed from 1984 to 1993. He held the IBF cruiserweight title from 1989 to 1990, and at regional level held the British and Commonwealth cruiserweight title between 1987 and 1988. He has worked as a commentator and pundit for Sky Sports since 1989.

== Professional boxing career ==
=== Early career ===
McCrory was born in Annfield Plain in County Durham. He made his professional debut in February 1984, scoring a 1st round knock out against Barry Ellis. Over the next 15 months he fought a further 12 times, winning on each occasion before suffering his first defeat against John Westgarth in September 1985. The defeat was to be the first in a series of losses for McCrory as he went on to lose a further four fights out of his next five. In November 1986 this run came to an end when a visit to Louisville, Kentucky saw him get back to winning ways against the inexperienced Joe Adams.

=== British and Commonwealth champion ===
The Adams win provided the springboard for a run of form which would take him first to the Commonwealth cruiserweight title and then to the British. Four straight victories set him up for a shot at Zambian Chisanda Mutti, the reigning Commonwealth champion, in Gateshead, Tyne and Wear on 4 September 1987. The fight went the distance with McCrory picking up a point win. In January 1988 he defended his title for the first time and picked up the British belt with a win over Tee Jay in Wandsworth. A further defence of both titles occurred in April 1988 when he returned to Gateshead to defeat challenger Lou Gent.

=== World champion ===
Three more wins over journeymen opponents followed the Gent victory before, in June 1989, McCrory challenged Patrick Lumumba for the vacant IBF cruiserweight title, winning the belt via a unanimous points decision. He made one defence of the belt against Siza Makathini in October 1989 before losing it to American Jeff Lampkin in March 1990.

=== Further challenges ===
Following the Lampkin defeat, McCrory moved up to heavyweight and in September 1991 lost in a challenge to future world champion Lennox Lewis, failing in his bid to win Lewis's British and European titles. Two victories and a draw against journeymen followed the Lewis defeat before a trip to Moscow in July 1993 resulted in an unsuccessful attempt to win back his IBF belt, losing over 12 rounds to reigning champion Alfred Cole. The fight was to prove his last as a professional as McCrory retired from the sport with a record of won 30, lost 8, drawn 1.

== Post-boxing career ==
Since retirement, McCrory has become a television commentator and occasional actor, employed by Sky Television as the long time sidekick of Ian Darke. He has also made occasional appearances as an actor on television and on stage.

McCrory gained a professional trainer's license and opened a gym in the Newbiggin Hall Estate in Newcastle. Wider ambitions for the gym included McCrory's wish for it to be used as a possible training camp for the Team GB boxers before the 2012 Summer Olympics.

== Professional boxing record ==
39 fights	30 wins	8 losses
By knockout	12	5
By decision	18	3
Draws	1	

No.	Result	Record	Opponent	Type	Round, time	Date	Location	Notes
39	Loss	30–8–1	(United States) Alfred Cole	UD	12	16 Jul 1993	CSKA Moscow, Moscow, Russia	For IBF cruiserweight title
38	Win	30–7–1	(United States) Mark Young	UD	10	6 May 1993	(United States) Riviera Hotel and Casino, Winchester, Nevada, US	
37	Win	29–7–1	(United States) Ric Lainhart	TKO	2 (10)	20 Jan 1993	Avoriaz, France	
36	Draw	28–7–1	(Algeria) Mohamed Bouchiche	PTS	8	26 Sep 1992	Paris, France	
35	Loss	28–7	(United Kingdom) Lennox Lewis	KO	2 (12), 1:30	30 Sep 1991	(United Kingdom) Royal Albert Hall, London, England	For British and European heavyweight titles
34	Win	28–6	(United States) Terry Armstrong	KO	2 (10)	16 Feb 1991	(United Kingdom) Pavilion, Thornaby, England	
33	Loss	27–6	(United States) Jeff Lampkin	KO	3 (12), 2:20	22 Mar 1990	(United Kingdom) Leisure Centre, Gateshead, England	Lost IBF cruiserweight title
32	Win	27–5	(South Africa) Siza Makathini	KO	11 (12), 1:07	21 Oct 1989	(United Kingdom) Eston Sports Academy, Middlesbrough, England	Retained IBF cruiserweight title
31	Win	26–5	(Kenya) Patrick Lumumba	UD	12	3 Jun 1989	(United Kingdom) Louisa Centre, Stanley, England	Won vacant IBF cruiserweight title
30	Win	25–5	(United States) Steve Mormino	PTS	10	28 Feb 1989	(United Kingdom) Marton Country Club, Marton, England	
29	Win	24–5	(United States) Lorenzo Boyd	KO	2 (10)	15 Nov 1988	(United States) Metairie Landmark Hotel, Metairie, Louisiana, US	
28	Win	23–5	(United States) Ron Lee Warrior	TKO	5 (10), 2:58	1 Nov 1988	(United States) Central Plaza Hotel, Oklahoma City, Oklahoma, US	
27	Win	22–5	(United Kingdom) Lou Gent	RTD	8 (12), 3:00	22 Apr 1988	(United Kingdom) Leisure Centre, Gateshead, England	Retained British and Commonwealth cruiserweight titles
26	Win	21–5	(United Kingdom) Tee Jay	PTS	12	21 Jan 1988	(United Kingdom) Latchmere Leisure Centre, London, England	Retained Commonwealth cruiserweight title; Won British cruiserweight title
25	Win	20–5	(Zambia) Chisanda Mutti	PTS	12	4 Sep 1987	(United Kingdom) Leisure Centre, Gateshead, England	Won Commonwealth cruiserweight title
24	Win	19–5	(United Kingdom) Andy Straughn	TKO	10 (10), 0:44	31 Mar 1987	(United Kingdom) Civic Sports Centre, Oldham, England	
23	Win	18–5	(United Kingdom) Barry Ellis	PTS	8	18 Feb 1987	(United Kingdom) West Hotel, Fulham, London, England	
22	Win	17–5	(United Kingdom) Danny Lawford	PTS	8	5 Feb 1987	(United Kingdom) Mayfair Suite, Newcastle, England	
21	Win	16–5	(United Kingdom) Calvin Sherman	KO	1 (8), 2:42	8 Jan 1987	(United Kingdom) Marriott Hotel, Houston, Texas, US	
20	Win	15–5	(United Kingdom) Joe Adams	PTS	6	25 Nov 1986	(United States) Louisville, Kentucky, US	
19	Loss	14–5	(United Kingdom) Hughroy Currie	KO	2 (10)	7 Oct 1986	(United Kingdom) Civic Sports Centre, Oldham, England	
18	Loss	14–4	(United Kingdom) Dave Garside	TKO	7 (8), 1:17	17 Jun 1986	(United Kingdom) Winter Gardens, Blackpool, England	
17	Loss	14–3	(Sweden) Anders Eklund	UD	8	18 Apr 1986	Randers Hallen, Randers, Denmark	
16	Loss	14–2	(United Kingdom) Rudi Pika	PTS	8	9 Apr 1986	(United Kingdom) Royal Albert Hall, London, England	
15	Win	14–1	(United Kingdom) Roy Skeldon	PTS	8	10 Dec 1985	(United Kingdom) Leisure Centre, Gateshead, England	
14	Loss	13–1	(United Kingdom) John Westgarth	KO	4 (10), 0:56	3 Sep 1985	(United Kingdom) Leisure Centre, Gateshead, England	
13	Win	13–0	(United Kingdom) Alfonso Forbes	KO	1 (6), 1:10	28 May 1985	(United Kingdom) Alexandra Pavilion, London, England	
12	Win	12–0	(United Kingdom) George Carmen	PTS	8	27 Mar 1985	(United Kingdom) Leisure Centre, Gateshead, England	
11	Win	11–0	(Canada) Alex Williamson	PTS	8	20 Feb 1985	(United Kingdom) Alexandra Palace, London, England	
10	Win	10–0	(United States) Nate Robinson	TKO	2 (6)	19 Jan 1985	(United Kingdom) National Exhibition Centre, Birmingham, England	
9	Win	9–0	(United States) Mike Perkins	PTS	8	24 Nov 1984	(United Kingdom) Leisure Centre, Gateshead, England	
8	Win	8–0	(United States) Tony Velasco	PTS	8	27 Oct 1984	(United Kingdom) Stormont Maine Club, Gateshead, England	
7	Win	7–0	(United Kingdom) Andrew Gerrard	PTS	8	6 Sep 1984	(United Kingdom) Federation Brewery, Gateshead, England	
6	Win	6–0	(United Kingdom) Andrew Gerrard	PTS	6	13 Jun 1984	(United Kingdom) Afan Lido, Port Talbot, England	
5	Win	5–0	(United Kingdom) Frank Robinson	TKO	4 (6)	9 May 1984	(United Kingdom) Marriott Hotel, Mayfair, London, England	
4	Win	4–0	(United Kingdom) Frank Robinson	PTS	6	30 Apr 1984	(United Kingdom) Grosvenor House, Mayfair, London, England	
3	Win	3–0	(United Kingdom) Steve Abadom	PTS	6	21 Mar 1984	(United Kingdom) Marriott Hotel, Mayfair, London, England	
2	Win	2–0	(United Kingdom) Denroy Bryan	PTS	6	22 Feb 1984	(United Kingdom) Royal Albert Hall, Kensington, London, England	
1	Win	1–0	(United Kingdom) Barry Ellis	TKO	1 (6)	6 Feb 1984	(United Kingdom) Marriott Hotel, Mayfair, London, England	

Preceded by Evander Holyfield; Vacates	IBF Cruiserweight Champion; 3 June 1989 – 22 Mar 1990	Succeeded by Jeff Lampkin
Preceded by Chisanda Mutti	Commonwealth Cruiserweight Champion; 4 September 1987 – 19 April 1989 (Vacated)	Succeeded by Apollo Sweet filled vacancy
