= Marcelo Domínguez =

Argentine boxer

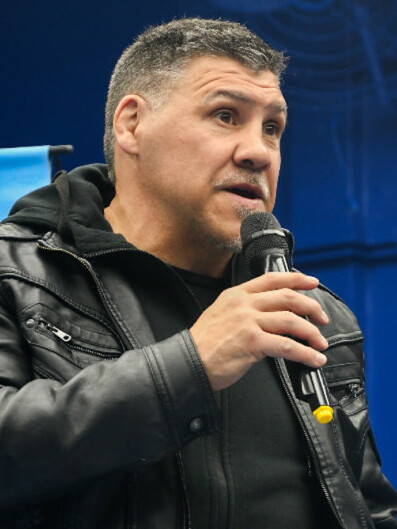

Personal information
- Nicknames: El Gordo ("The Fat Man"); El Toro ("The Bull")
- Born: Marcelo Fabian Domínguez; 15 January 1970 (age 56) Buenos Aires, Argentina
- Height: 5 ft 9 1/2 in (177 cm)
- Weight: Cruiserweight; Heavyweight

Boxing career
- Reach: 71 in (180 cm)
- Stance: Orthodox

Boxing record
- Total fights: 57
- Wins: 48
- Win by KO: 25
- Losses: 8
- Draws: 1

Marcelo Fabián Domínguez (born January 15, 1970) is an Argentine former professional boxer who competed from 1991 to 2015. He held the World Boxing Council (WBC) cruiserweight title from 1996 to 1998. At regional level, he held the Argentinian cruiserweight title from 1993 to 1994, and Argentinian heavyweight title from 2002 to 2007.

== Professional career ==
Domínguez turned pro in 1991 and was able to land a title shot in only his sixteenth fight, against Anaclet Wamba in 1994 for the WBC cruiserweight title. Wamba won a majority decision. Domínguez was able to capture the interim WBC belt the following year though with a TKO win over Akim Tafer. He was able to defend the belt five times, being promoted to full champ along the way, before losing the belt to Juan Carlos Gómez in 1998 via decision. Domínguez rematched Gómez in 1999, and again came up short in a decision. In 2001, he was able to land a shot at WBO cruiserweight title holder Johnny Nelson, but lost a decision.

Domínguez later moved up to heavyweight and after drifting into obscurity for several years and fighting for fringe titles, Domínguez lined up a shot for the WBO interim cruiserweight title against Enzo Maccarinelli, but was TKO'd.

Dominguez retired after 2006, but returned in 2013.

== Professional boxing record ==
57 fights	48 wins	8 losses
By knockout	25	2
By decision	22	6
By disqualification	1	0
Draws	1	

No.	Result	Record	Opponent	Type	Round, time	Date	Location	Notes
57	Win	48–8–1	Nelson Dario Dominguez	UD	6	7 Mar 2015	Ce.De.M. N° 2, Caseros, Argentina	
56	Loss	47–8–1	Matias Ariel Vidondo	TKO	2 (10), 1:59	11 Oct 2014	Independiente de Neuquén, Neuquén, Argentina	For Argentine heavyweight title
55	Win	47–7–1	Javier Corrales	TKO	2 (8)	19 Jun 2014	Club Social y Deportivo Camioneros, Buenos Aires, Argentina	
54	Win	46–7–1	Manuel Alberto Pucheta	UD	8	15 Mar 2014	Club Sportivo La Floresta, San Miguel de Tucumán, Argentina	
53	Win	45–7–1	Martin David Islas	UD	8	14 Dec 2013	Polideportivo Municipal, Monte Hermoso, Argentina	
52	Win	44–7–1	Héctor Alfredo Ávila	TKO	7 (10)	31 Aug 2013	Club Social y Deportivo Camioneros, Buenos Aires, Argentina	
51	Win	43–7–1	Miguel Angel Morales	UD	8	15 Jun 2013	Centro Recreativo Pasteleros, Luis Guillón, Argentina	
50	Win	42–7–1	Alfredo Brigido Ruiz Diaz	TKO	7 (10), 0:38	3 May 2013	Club BANADE, Martínez, Argentina	
49	Win	41–7–1	Fabio Eduardo Moli	TKO	6 (12), 0:59	2 Dec 2006	Microestadio Malvinas Argentinas, Buenos Aires, Argentina	Retained Argentine & South American heavyweight titles
48	Loss	40–7–1	Enzo Maccarinelli	TKO	9 (12), 0:58	8 Jul 2006	Millennium Stadium, Cardiff, Wales	For interim WBO cruiserweight title
47	Win	40–6–1	Mariano Ramon Ocampo	UD	10	3 Feb 2006	Corsódromo de Gualeguaychú, Gualeguaychú, Argentina	Retained Argentine heavyweight title
46	Win	39–6–1	Fabio Eduardo Moli	RTD	7 (12), 2:13	12 Aug 2005	Orfeo Superdomo, Córdoba, Argentina	Retained South American heavyweight title; Won vacant WBO Latino heavyweight title
45	Win	38–6–1	Carlos Javier Ojeda Roldan	TKO	10 (12)	22 Apr 2005	Estadio Cubierto Newell's Old Boys, Rosario, Argentina	Retained Argentine heavyweight title
44	Loss	37–6–1	Cengiz Koc	UD	8	18 Dec 2004	Oberfrankenhalle, Bayreuth, Germany	
43	Loss	37–5–1	Nikolay Valuev	UD	8	17 Apr 2004	Max-Schmeling-Halle, Berlin, Germany	
42	Win	37–4–1	Edegar Da Silva	RTD	4 (12), 2:40	6 Dec 2003	Gran Hotel Casino Iguazú, Puerto Iguazú, Argentina	Retained South American heavyweight title
41	Win	36–4–1	Miguel Angel Antonio Aguirre	UD	10	1 Mar 2003	Club Costa Azul, Tres Arroyos, Argentina	
40	Win	35–4–1	Fabio Eduardo Moli	UD	12	19 Oct 2002	Estadio Luna Park, Buenos Aires, Argentina	Retained South American heavyweight title; Won Argentine heavyweight title
39	Win	34–4–1	Eduardo Andres Sandivares	KO	3 (12)	27 Jul 2002	Estadio F.A.B., Buenos Aires, Argentina	Retained South American heavyweight title
38	Win	33–4–1	Pedro Daniel Franco	UD	12	11 May 2002	Argentino de Quilmes, Quilmes, Argentina	Won South American heavyweight title
37	Loss	32–4–1	Johnny Nelson	UD	12	21 Jul 2001	Ponds Forge, Sheffield, England	For WBO cruiserweight title
36	Win	32–3–1	Jose Gomes	UD	10	26 May 2001	Gimnasia y Esgrima de Ituzaingó, Ituzaingó, Argentina	
35	Win	31–3–1	George Arias	UD	10	4 Nov 2000	Gimnasia y Esgrima de Ituzaingó, Ituzaingó, Argentina	
34	Win	30–3–1	Miguel Angel Antonio Aguirre	UD	10	29 Apr 2000	Radisson Hotel, Montevideo, Uruguay	
33	Win	29–3–1	Ken Hulsey	TKO	3 (10)	4 Dec 1999	Stadionsporthalle, Hanover, Germany	
32	Win	28–3–1	Argemiro Antonio Dos Santos	RTD	3 (10)	2 Oct 1999	Radisson Hotel, Montevideo, Uruguay	
31	Win	27–3–1	Ignacio Monzon Zarza	TKO	3 (12), 0:35	21 Aug 1999	Radisson Hotel, Montevideo, Uruguay	
30	Loss	26–3–1	Juan Carlos Gomez	UD	12	13 Mar 1999	Hansehalle, Lübeck, Germany	For WBC cruiserweight title
29	Win	26–2–1	Miguel Angel Robledo	UD	10	14 Nov 1998	Morón, Argentina	
28	Win	25–2–1	Miguel Angel Antonio Aguirre	UD	10	9 Oct 1998	Club Atlético Huracán, Buenos Aires, Argentina	
27	Win	24–2–1	Ricardo Alfredo Ibarra	RTD	7 (10)	11 Sep 1998	Club Laboulaye, Laboulaye, Argentina	
26	Win	23–2–1	Angel Amarilla Garcia	TKO	3 (10)	7 Aug 1998	Montevideo, Uruguay	
25	Loss	22–2–1	Juan Carlos Gomez	UD	12	21 Feb 1998	Polideportivo Islas Malvinas, Mar del Plata, Argentina	Lost WBC cruiserweight title
24	Win	22–1–1	Akim Tafer	UD	12	16 Aug 1997	La Palestre, Le Cannet, France	Retained WBC cruiserweight title
23	Win	21–1–1	Jose Arimatea Da Silva	TKO	8 (12)	6 Dec 1996	Ciudad Jardín Lomas del Palomar, Argentina	Retained WBC cruiserweight title
22	Win	20–1–1	Patrice Aouissi	TKO	10 (12)	5 Jul 1996	Espace 3000, Hyères, France	Retained WBC cruiserweight title
21	Win	19–1–1	Sergei Kobozev	SD	12	24 Oct 1995	Palais des sports Marcel-Cerdan, Levallois-Perret, France	Retained interim WBC cruiserweight title
20	Win	18–1–1	Reinaldo Gimenez	TKO	12 (12), 2:47	2 Sep 1995	Club Juventud Unida, Gualeguaychú, Argentina	Retained interim WBC cruiserweight title
19	Win	17–1–1	Akim Tafer	TKO	9 (12)	25 Jul 1995	Saint-Jean-de-Luz, France	Won interim WBC cruiserweight title
18	Win	16–1–1	Luiz Delmiro Alves	KO	4 (10)	1 Jul 1995	Buenos Aires, Argentina	
17	Win	15–1–1	Carlton West	TKO	3 (10)	14 Apr 1995	Quilmes, Argentina	
16	Loss	14–1–1	Anaclet Wamba	MD	12	3 Dec 1994	Polideportivo Delmi, Salta, Argentina	For WBC cruiserweight title
15	Win	14–0–1	Juan Alberto Barrero	UD	10	8 Sep 1994	Sociedad de Fomento Villa Reconquista, Ciudadela, Argentina	
14	Win	13–0–1	Oscar Alfredo Gonzalez	UD	12	30 Aug 1994	Club Deportivo San Andrés, San Andrés, Argentina	Retained Argentine cruiserweight title
13	Win	12–0–1	Eduardo Luiz Dos Santos	KO	4 (10)	28 Jul 1994	Sociedad de Fomento Villa Reconquista, Ciudadela, Argentina	
12	Win	11–0–1	Miguel Angel Antonio Aguirre	UD	8	14 May 1994	Río Grande, Argentina	
11	Win	10–0–1	Miguel Angel Robledo	UD	8	28 Apr 1994	Ciudadela, Argentina	
10	Win	9–0–1	Ricardo Alfredo Ibarra	TKO	8 (12)	30 Oct 1993	Estadio F.A.B., Buenos Aires, Argentina	Retained Argentine cruiserweight title
9	Win	8–0–1	Joao de Deus Silva	KO	1 (8)	10 Sep 1993	Tigre, Argentina	
8	Win	7–0–1	Oscar Alfredo Gonzalez	UD	8	1 May 1993	Buenos Aires, Argentina	
7	Win	6–0–1	Nestor Hipolito Giovannini	DQ	4 (12)	20 Feb 1993	Estadio F.A.B., Buenos Aires, Argentina	Won vacant Argentine cruiserweight title
6	Win	5–0–1	Miguel Angel Antonio Aguirre	UD	8	9 Dec 1992	Estadio F.A.B., Buenos Aires, Argentina	
5	Win	4–0–1	Oscar Angel Gomez	TKO	6 (6), 1:42	18 Nov 1992	Estadio F.A.B., Buenos Aires, Argentina	
4	Win	3–0–1	Alberto Valerio Jorge Arias	KO	2 (8), 1:26	30 Sep 1992	Estadio F.A.B., Buenos Aires, Argentina	
3	Draw	2–0–1	Raul Andres Aguiar	PTS	10	7 Aug 1992	Luján, Argentina	
2	Win	2–0	Juan Carlos Belizan	UD	6	8 Nov 1991	Concepción, Argentina	
1	Win	1–0	Gustavo Jorge Vazquez	KO	4 (6)	4 Oct 1991	Concepción del Uruguay, Argentina	

== See also ==
- List of male boxers
- List of world cruiserweight boxing champions

Sporting positions
Regional boxing titles
Vacant Title last held by Daniel Eduardo Neto	Argentine cruiserweight champion 20 February 1993 – 25 July 1995; Won interim title	Vacant Title next held by Dario Walter Matteoni
Preceded by Pedro Daniel Franco	South American heavyweight champion 11 May 2002 – 2007; Vacated	Vacant Title next held by Cesar Gustavo Acevedo
Preceded by Fabio Moli	Argentine heavyweight champion 19 October 2002 – 2007; Vacated	Vacant Title next held by Lisandro Ezequiel Diaz
Vacant Title last held by Kendrick Releford	WBO Latino heavyweight champion 12 August 2005 – 2005; Vacated	Vacant Title next held by Mike Mollo
World boxing titles
New title	WBC cruiserweight champion Interim title 25 July 1995 – 25 May 1996; Promoted	Vacant
Preceded by Anaclet Wamba; Stripped	WBC cruiserweight champion 25 May 1996 – 21 February 1998	Succeeded by Juan Carlos Gómez
