= Ezra Sellers =

American boxer

Personal information
- Nationality: American
- Born: Ezra Nathan Sellers; September 2, 1968
- Died: December 12, 2013 (aged 45) Pensacola, Florida, United States
- Height: 6 ft 1 in (185 cm)
- Weight: Cruiserweight

Boxing career
- Reach: 77 in (196 cm)
- Stance: Southpaw

Boxing record
- Total fights: 37
- Wins: 29
- Win by KO: 26
- Losses: 8

Ezra Nathan Sellers (September 2, 1968 – December 12, 2013) was an American cruiserweight boxer. He lived in Pensacola, Florida, where he died on December 12, 2013, due to heart problems.

Sellers won the world IBO cruiserweight championship against Carl Thompson; however, his title was vacated after losing to WBO champion Johnny Nelson on April 6, 2002 in Copenhagen, Denmark, who declined the IBO belt.

He was inducted into the Florida Boxing Hall of Fame in 2013.

== Professional boxing record ==
29 Wins (26 knockouts, 3 decisions), 8 Losses (8 knockouts, 0 decisions)
| Result | Record | Opponent | Type | Round | Date | Location | Notes |
| Loss | 21-4 | Emmanuel Nwodo | KO | 2 | 19 Jan 2008 | New York City, New York, U.S. | Sellers knocked out at 2:59 of the second round. |
| Win | 28-19 | Kenny Craven | TKO | 3 | 7 Dec 2007 | Biloxi, Mississippi, U.S. | Referee stopped the bout at 1:46 of the third round. |
| Win | 12-10-1 | Troy Beets | TKO | 6 | 14 Jul 2007 | Biloxi, Mississippi, U.S. | Referee stopped the bout at 2:30 of the sixth round. |
| Loss | 22-1-1 | O'Neil Bell | KO | 2 | 4 Sep 2004 | Paradise, Nevada, U.S. | Sellers knocked out at 2:04 of the second round. |
| Loss | 20-2-1 | Kelvin Davis | TKO | 8 | 1 May 2004 | Miami, Florida, U.S. | IBF Cruiserweight Title. Referee stopped the bout at 2:33 of the eighth round. |
| Win | 11-5-4 | Joseph Awinongya | UD | 8 | 28 Jun 2003 | Coconut Creek, Florida, U.S. | |
| Win | 16-3 | Jason Robinson | TKO | 2 | 1 Mar 2003 | Paradise, Nevada, U.S. | Referee stopped the bout at 0:53 of the second round. |
| Win | 9-10 | Kevin Tallon | TKO | 1 | 7 Sep 2002 | Portland, Oregon, U.S. | |
| Loss | 41-12-1 | Johnny Nelson | KO | 8 | 6 Apr 2002 | Copenhagen, Denmark | WBO Cruiserweight Title. Sellers knocked out at 2:39 of the eighth round. |
| Win | 28-5 | Carl Thompson | KO | 4 | 26 Nov 2001 | Manchester, England | IBO Cruiserweight Title. Thompson knocked out at 1:36 of the fourth round. |
| Win | 14-11 | Onebo Maxime | KO | 2 | 20 Jun 2001 | Kenner, Louisiana, U.S. | |
| Loss | 14-3 | Ramon Garbey | TKO | 1 | 17 May 2001 | Biloxi, Mississippi, U.S. | WBO NABO Cruiserweight Title. Referee stopped the bout at 1:45 of the first round. |
| Win | 12-0 | Sidney Mack | TKO | 1 | 29 Jul 2000 | Tunica, Mississippi, U.S. | Referee stopped the bout at 1:38 of the first round. |
| Win | 16-1-1 | Willard Lewis | TKO | 3 | 1 Apr 2000 | Atlantic City, New Jersey, U.S. | WBO NABO Cruiserweight Title. |
| Win | 7-1 | Drexie James | TKO | 8 | 25 Feb 2000 | Tunica, Mississippi, U.S. | Referee stopped the bout at 1:50 of the eighth round. |
| Win | 38-9-4 | Nestor Hipolito Giovannini | TKO | 1 | 29 Jan 2000 | Atlantic City, New Jersey, U.S. | |
| Win | 11-6 | Matt Green | UD | 8 | 10 Dec 1999 | Biloxi, Mississippi, U.S. | |
| Win | 21-8-1 | Miguel Angel Medina Burgos | TKO | 6 | 19 Nov 1999 | Tunica, Mississippi, U.S. | Referee stopped the bout at 3:00 of the sixth round. |
| Win | 17-75-2 | Danny Wofford | TKO | 4 | 15 Jan 1999 | Lake Worth, Florida, U.S. | Referee stopped the bout at 3:05 of the fourth round. |
| Loss | 42-8 | Alex Stewart | TKO | 3 | 8 Oct 1998 | Kansas City, Missouri, U.S. | Referee stopped the bout at 2:43 of the third round. |
| Win | 11-25-3 | Marion Wilson | UD | 10 | 12 Jun 1998 | Baton Rouge, Louisiana, U.S. | |
| Win | 22-5-2 | John McClain | TKO | 1 | 7 Aug 1997 | Mashantucket, Connecticut, U.S. | WBU Super Cruiserweight Title. Referee stopped the bout at 1:26 of the first round. |
| Win | 7-7-1 | Ken McCurdy | KO | 1 | 22 Nov 1996 | Tampa, Florida, U.S. | |
| Win | 9-6 | Artis Pendergrass | TKO | 10 | 11 Sep 1996 | Pensacola, Florida, U.S. | NABU Cruiserweight Title. |
| Win | 8-13 | Earl Talley | TKO | 1 | 15 Jun 1996 | Jacksonville, Florida, U.S. | Referee stopped the bout at 1:10 of the first round. |
| Win | 8-0-1 | Mike Pearman | TKO | 3 | 18 Apr 1996 | Tulsa, Oklahoma, U.S. | |
| Win | 2-4 | George Barlow | TKO | 1 | 28 Mar 1996 | Pensacola, Florida, U.S. | |
| Win | 6-14-1 | James Fernandez | KO | 1 | 8 Dec 1995 | Pensacola, Florida, U.S. | |
| Win | 7-1-1 | Richie Brown | TKO | 4 | 24 Jun 1995 | Atlantic City, New Jersey, U.S. | |
| Win | 1-0 | Tom Williams | TKO | 1 | 18 Mar 1995 | Pensacola, Florida, U.S. | |
| Win | 11-7 | Gary Butler | TKO | 1 | 20 Sep 1994 | Pensacola, Florida, U.S. | |
| Win | 3-2 | Rick Willis | TKO | 1 | 22 Mar 1994 | Pensacola, Florida, U.S. | |
| Loss | 3-8 | Ed Thompson | TKO | 4 | 7 Jun 1993 | Winston-Salem, North Carolina, U.S. | |
| Win | 3-1-1 | Dayton Wheeler | KO | 3 | 12 Feb 1993 | Bushkill, Pennsylvania, U.S. | |
| Win | -- | Richard McComber | TKO | 1 | 15 Sep 1992 | Fort Lauderdale, Florida, U.S. | |
| Win | 13-42-2 | Frankie Hines | KO | 3 | 21 Mar 1992 | Winston-Salem, North Carolina, U.S. | |
| Loss | 5-0 | Bruce Seldon | TKO | 2 | 22 Aug 1989 | Atlantic City, New Jersey, U.S. | |

Achievements
| Preceded by Carl Thompson | IBO Cruiserweight Champion; November 26, 2001 - April 26, 2002 | Succeeded by Sebastian Rothmann; Filled vacancy |
