= Tee Jay =

Ghanaian-born British boxer

Personal information
- Nationality: British
- Born: Taju Akay; 21 January 1962 Accra
- Died: 19 May 2006 (aged 44) London, England
- Height: 6 ft 1 in (1.85 m)
- Weight: Cruiserweight

Boxing career

Boxing record
- Total fights: 19
- Wins: 14
- Win by KO: 8
- Losses: 4
- Draws: 1

Taju Akay (21 January 1962 – 19 May 2006), known professionally as Tee Jay, was a Ghanaian-born British boxer. After fighting for Ghana at the 1984 Olympic Games he turned professional and went on to become British cruiserweight champion.

== Career ==
Born in Accra, Ghana in 1962, Akay settled with his family in Paddington London in the 1970s where he boxed out of the All Stars Boxing and Youth Club, which his father—former professional Isola Akay had started. He represented Ghana at the 1984 Summer Olympics at light-heavyweight, losing to Evander Holyfield in the first stage of the competition.

He turned pro in 1985, and was unbeaten in his first five fights. In October 1986 he faced Andy Straughn for the British cruiserweight title vacated by Sammy Reeson, losing on points. He got another shot at the title in May 1987, this time stopping defending champion Roy Smith in the first round to take the title.

Three further victories in 1987 set him up for a challenge for Glenn McCrory's Commonwealth title. The two met in January 1988 with both the British and Commonwealth titles at stake; McCrory won on points. When McCrory vacated the British title later that year, Akay and Straughn met in November to contest it; Straughn again took a narrow points decision.

Akay won his next six fights and in May 1991 got another chance to win the British and Commonwealth titles when he faced Derek Angol at the Royal Albert Hall. Angol stopped Akay in the third round to retain the titles. This proved to be Akay's final fight.

Taju Akay died in May 2006 after suffering a heart attack.
