= Juan Carlos Gómez =

Cuban boxer

Personal information
- Nicknames: Pantera Negra ("Black Panther")
- Born: 26 July 1973 (age 52) Havana, Cuba
- Height: 6 ft 3 1/2 in (192 cm)
- Weight: Cruiserweight; Heavyweight

Boxing career
- Reach: 80 1/2 in (204 cm)
- Stance: Southpaw

Boxing record
- Total fights: 60
- Wins: 55
- Win by KO: 39
- Losses: 4
- No contests: 1

Juan Carlos Gómez (born 26 July 1973) is a Cuban former professional boxer who competed from 1995 to 2014. He held the WBC cruiserweight title from 1998 to 2002, and challenged once for the WBC heavyweight title in 2009.

== Early life ==
Gómez is one of eleven children in a family where discipline and respect were fundamental, a situation influenced by the absence of his father, a heavy machinery operator. His formative years were characterized by the necessity of hard work and education, as his family depended on each other for support and guidance.

His entry into boxing was not a voluntary decision but rather a response to defending his brother during a school conflict, which resulted in a punishment that required him to either transfer to a different school or take up boxing. Initially hesitant, Gómez eventually recognized his aptitude for the sport, rapidly ascending to national champion status by the ages of 15 and 16. Despite his accomplishments, he experienced disappointment when he was passed over for international competitions, a situation he attributed to his age, which fostered feelings of frustration regarding the sacrifices he had made for training.

Gómez's journey experienced a significant turning point during his participation in the Chemistry Cup in Halle, Germany, where he made a crucial decision that would influence his future in boxing. This experience illuminated the challenges and sacrifices he encountered in pursuit of his athletic career, underscoring both his resilience and determination.

== Amateur career ==
- Amateur Record: 158–12
- 1990 – Gold Medal World Junior Championships in Lima at 75 kg
- 1994 – Represented Cuba at the Chemistry Cup, his results were:

Defeated Jan Schwank (Germany) 9–4

Lost to Sven Ottke (Germany) 9–9

- 1994 – Competed at the USA Vs Cuba Cup in Ledyard, US

Defeated Antonio Tarver (USA) 10–10

- 1995 – Represented Cuba at the Chemistry Cup, his results were:

Lost to Thomas Ulrich (Germany) 12–16

== Professional career ==
=== Cruiserweight ===
The southpaw turned pro as a cruiser for Universum box promotions.

On 21 February 1998, in Mar del Plata, Argentina, Gómez won the WBC Cruiserweight title from reigning champion, Marcelo Fabian Dominguez via a unanimous decision.

Nicknamed "Black Panther", Gómez ruled the cruiserweight division from 1998–2001, successfully defending his WBC Cruiserweight title against ten different fighters. Among his notable defenses were those against Dominguez (rematch), Imamu Mayfield and the smaller Jorge Castro who was KOd for the first time. James Toney declined a title shot when he was mandatory and later fought and beat Vassily Jirov.

He then vacated the title in February 2002 in order to move up to the Heavyweight ranks.

=== Heavyweight ===
In 2001 Gómez tested the waters in the heavyweight division and beaten durable veteran Al Cole (another former Cruiserweight champ) by TKO 6. Gómez then moved back down to defend his title against Pietro Aurino, and after defeating Aurino he moved up to heavyweight permanently.

Gómez has had some success at heavyweight, capturing wins over Sinan Samil Sam and David Defiagbon, but was shockingly TKO'd by fellow Cuban Yanqui Díaz in the first round in 2004.

Gómez defeated Don King promoted Oliver McCall via a ten-round decision on 15 October 2005, a result which was changed shortly thereafter to a no contest after Gomez failed a post-fight drug test due to a presence of cocaine. Gómez vehemently denied the charge and backed this up by producing a negative test where no drugs were found in his system, though this test was taken two months after the fight.

After that Gómez announced that he converted to Islam. Gómez stated, '"After they stole my victory over Oliver McCall because of doping in October 2005 I was totally devastated. I swear that I never doped in my life. After the fight I went to the USA where I was built up by the Black Muslim community. That's why I converted to Islam. I thank Allah for giving me back my courage, energy and self esteem."' Gómez then returned to the ring on 15 December 2006 and on 19 October 2007, once again outpointed Oliver McCall winning the WBC International Heavyweight title in the process, then on 27 September 2008, at the Color Line Arena in Hamburg, Germany, Gómez defeated Vladimir Virchis to become the #1 contender for the WBC heavyweight title.

Gómez faced WBC Heavyweight titleholder Vitali Klitschko on 21 March in Stuttgart, Germany. Early in the fight, Gomez managed to frustrate Klitschko by diverting a large number of jabs, but eventually Klitschko was able to establish control using his immense size and superior punching power. He was floored by a big right hand in round seven, but managed to get up. After a barrage of punches in round nine, the referee stopped the fight.

On 27 March 2010, Gómez made a successful comeback, defeating Alexey Mazikin to win the WBA International Heavyweight title. He went on to defeat Alexander Kahl of Germany on April 9 in Hamburg to record his second victory in a fortnight.

== Professional boxing record ==
60 fights	55 wins	4 losses
By knockout	40	3
By decision	15	1
No contests	1	

No.	Result	Record	Opponent	Type	Round, time	Date	Location	Notes
60	Loss	55–4 (1)	Dmitry Kudryashov	KO	1 (10), 0:22	28 Nov 2014	Luzhniki Stadium, Moscow, Russia	Lost WBA International cruiserweight title
59	Win	55–3 (1)	Goran Delic	TKO	5 (10), 1:32	6 Jul 2014	Akhmat-Arena, Grozny, Russia	Won vacant WBA International cruiserweight title
58	Win	54–3 (1)	Ivica Bacurin	SD	8	8 Mar 2014	Messzi István Sportcsarnok, Kecskemét, Hungary	
57	Win	53–3 (1)	Jindrich Velecky	UD	8	23 Nov 2013	CU Arena, Hamburg, Germany	
56	Win	52–3 (1)	Adnan Buharalija	TKO	2 (10), 2:55	1 Nov 2013	ASV-Halle, Dachau, Germany	
55	Win	51–3 (1)	Maksym Pedyura	UD	8	11 May 2012	EWS Arena, Göppingen, Germany	
54	Win	50–3 (1)	Darnell Wilson	TKO	4 (8), 0:22	21 Apr 2012	Sport- und Kongresshalle, Schwerin, Germany	
53	Loss	49–3 (1)	Darnell Wilson	MD	10	24 Sep 2011	Dima Sport-Center, Hamburg, Germany	
52	Win	49–2 (1)	Harold Sconiers	TKO	4 (8), 0:27	4 Dec 2010	Sport- und Kongresshalle, Schwerin, Germany	
51	Win	48–2 (1)	Zack Page	UD	8	31 Jul 2010	O2 World, Hamburg, Germany	
50	Win	47–2 (1)	Özcan Çetinkaya	UD	8	4 Jun 2010	Karl-Eckel-Weg Halle, Hattersheim am Main, Germany	
49	Win	46–2 (1)	Alexander Kahl	UD	8	9 Apr 2010	Sport- und Kongresshalle, Schwerin, Germany	
48	Win	45–2 (1)	Oleksiy Mazikin	KO	3 (12), 2:44	27 Mar 2010	Alsterdorfer Sporthalle, Hamburg, Germany	Won vacant WBA International heavyweight title
47	Loss	44–2 (1)	Vitali Klitschko	TKO	9 (12), 1:49	21 Mar 2009	Hanns-Martin-Schleyer-Halle, Stuttgart, Germany	For WBC heavyweight title
46	Win	44–1 (1)	Volodymyr Virchis	UD	12	27 Sep 2008	Color Line Arena, Hamburg, Germany	
45	Win	43–1 (1)	Oliver McCall	UD	12	19 Oct 2007	Estrel Hotel, Berlin, Germany	Won WBC International heavyweight title
44	Win	42–1 (1)	Denis Bakhtov	UD	12	16 Jun 2007	Atatürk Sport Hall, Ankara, Turkey	Won vacant PABA heavyweight title
43	Win	41–1 (1)	Adenilson Rodrigues	TKO	1 (12), 0:33	10 Feb 2007	Grand Elysée Hotel, Hamburg, Germany	Won vacant WBC Latino heavyweight title
42	Win	40–1 (1)	Daniel Frank	KO	3 (8), 2:00	15 Dec 2006	Alsterdorfer Sporthalle, Hamburg, Germany	
41	NC	39–1 (1)	Oliver McCall	UD	10	15 Oct 2005	Burg-Wächter Castello, Düsseldorf, Germany	Originally a UD win for Gómez, later ruled an NC after he failed a drug test
40	Win	39–1	George Arias	KO	4 (8), 2:27	28 May 2005	Hanns-Martin-Schleyer-Halle, Stuttgart, Germany	
39	Win	38–1	David Defiagbon	TKO	3 (12), 2:58	15 Jan 2005	Bördelandhalle, Magdeburg, Germany	
38	Loss	37–1	Yanqui Díaz	TKO	1 (8), 1:46	13 Aug 2004	Entertainment Center, Laredo, Texas, US	
37	Win	37–0	Sinan Şamil Sam	UD	10	27 Sep 2003	HSBC Arena, Buffalo, New York, US	
36	Win	36–0	Daniel Frank	TKO	2 (8)	17 Aug 2002	Estrel Hotel, Berlin, Germany	
35	Win	35–0	Ken Murphy	TKO	5 (8)	16 Mar 2002	Hanns-Martin-Schleyer-Halle, Stuttgart, Germany	
34	Win	34–0	Pietro Aurino	TKO	6 (12)	3 Nov 2001	Hansehalle, Lübeck, Germany	Retained WBC cruiserweight title
33	Win	33–0	Al Cole	TKO	5 (8), 1:10	4 Aug 2001	Mandalay Bay Events Center, Paradise, Nevada, US	
32	Win	32–0	Jorge Castro	TKO	10 (12), 1:56	16 Dec 2000	Grugahalle, Essen, Germany	Retained WBC cruiserweight title
31	Win	31–0	Imamu Mayfield	KO	3 (12), 0:50	6 May 2000	Swissôtel, Neuss, Germany	Retained WBC cruiserweight title
30	Win	30–0	Mohamed Siluvangi	TKO	2 (12), 2:35	11 Mar 2000	Hansehalle, Lübeck, Germany	Retained WBC cruiserweight title
29	Win	29–0	Napoleon Tagoe	KO	9 (12), 1:25	11 Dec 1999	Alsterdorfer Sporthalle, Hamburg, Germany	Retained WBC cruiserweight title
28	Win	28–0	Bruce Scott	TKO	6 (12), 2:45	17 Jul 1999	Philips Halle, Düsseldorf, Germany	Retained WBC cruiserweight title
27	Win	27–0	Marcelo Domínguez	UD	12	13 Mar 1999	Hansehalle, Lübeck, Germany	Retained WBC cruiserweight title
26	Win	26–0	Rodney Gordon	TKO	2 (12), 2:19	12 Dec 1998	Ballsporthalle, Frankfurt, Germany	Retained WBC cruiserweight title
25	Win	25–0	Alexey Ilyin	TKO	2 (12), 2:35	3 Oct 1998	Prinz-Garden Halle, Augsburg, Germany	Retained WBC cruiserweight title
24	Win	24–0	Guy Waters	TKO	6 (12), 1:30	5 Jun 1998	Sporthalle Wandsbek, Hamburg, Germany	Retained WBC cruiserweight title
23	Win	23–0	Marcelo Domínguez	UD	12	21 Feb 1998	Polideportivo Islas Malvinas, Mar del Plata, Argentina	Won WBC cruiserweight title
22	Win	22–0	Mike Robinson	KO	2	8 Nov 1997	Ballsporthalle, Frankfurt, Germany	
21	Win	21–0	Mike Sedillo	KO	2 (8)	4 Oct 1997	Stadionsporthalle, Hanover, Germany	
20	Win	20–0	Ted Cofie	TKO	4 (12)	12 Jul 1997	Berlet-Halle, Hagen, Germany	Retained WBC International cruiserweight title
19	Win	19–0	Valeriy Vykhor	TKO	5 (12)	14 Jun 1997	Saaltheater Geulen, Aachen, Germany	Retained WBC International cruiserweight title
18	Win	18–0	Guy Sonnenberg	KO	1	10 May 1997	Ballsporthalle, Frankfurt, Germany	
17	Win	17–0	Jose Arimatea da Silva	TKO	9 (12)	8 Mar 1997	Sartory-Saal, Cologne, Germany	Retained WBC International cruiserweight title
16	Win	16–0	Ron Carter	TKO	3	22 Feb 1997	Sporthalle Wandsbek, Hamburg, Germany	
15	Win	15–0	Mike Peak	PTS	8	25 Jan 1997	Maritim Hotel, Stuttgart, Germany	
14	Win	14–0	Dan Ward	KO	1 (12)	21 Dec 1996	Zoological Garden, Frankfurt, Germany	Retained WBC International cruiserweight title
13	Win	13–0	Brian LaSpada	TKO	11 (12)	19 Oct 1996	Zoological Garden, Frankfurt, Germany	Retained WBC International cruiserweight title
12	Win	12–0	Philippe Michel	TKO	9 (12)	17 Aug 1996	Zoological Garden, Frankfurt, Germany	Won vacant WBC International cruiserweight title
11	Win	11–0	Ludomir Dubac	TKO	2	8 Jun 1996	Sporthalle, Cologne, Germany	
10	Win	10–0	Tim Knight	PTS	8	4 May 1996	Sport- und Erholungszentrum, Berlin, Germany	
9	Win	9–0	David Robinson	TKO	2	13 Apr 1996	Sporthalle Wandsbek, Hamburg, Germany	
8	Win	8–0	Eduardo Antonio Carranza	TKO	2 (8)	6 Apr 1996	Stadionsporthalle, Hanover, Germany	
7	Win	7–0	Bobbie Joe Edwards	TKO	5 (8)	16 Mar 1996	Deutschlandhalle, Berlin, Germany	
6	Win	6–0	Cesar Agustin Basualdo	TKO	1 (8)	25 Feb 1996	Universum Gym, Hamburg, Germany	
5	Win	5–0	Karoly Kovacs	TKO	2	10 Feb 1996	Stadthalle, Cottbus, Germany	
4	Win	4–0	Keith McMurray	TKO	4 (6)	25 Nov 1995	Stadthalle, Braunschweig, Germany	
3	Win	3–0	Donnie Penelton	KO	2 (6)	19 Aug 1995	Eisstadion an der Brehmstraße, Düsseldorf, Germany	
2	Win	2–0	Hedi El Assaidi	TKO	4 (6), 2:30	5 Aug 1995	Sport- und Erholungszentrum, Berlin, Germany	
1	Win	1–0	Dale Jackson	PTS	6	20 May 1995	Alsterdorfer Sporthalle, Hamburg, Germany	

== Personal life ==
As of 2025, Gómez is a trainer based in Hamburg. He has a large family with eight children. His specialization lies in coaching young athletes who are actively involved in their respective sports.

== Television viewership ==
=== Germany ===
Date	Fight	Viewership (avg.)	Network	Source(s)
15 January 2005	Juan Carlos Gómez vs. David Defiagbon	2,260,000	ZDF	
28 May 2005	Juan Carlos Gómez vs. George Arias	1,020,000	ZDF	
15 October 2005	Juan Carlos Gómez vs. Oliver McCall I	2,000,000	ZDF	
21 March 2009	Vitali Klitschko vs. Juan Carlos Gomez	10,880,000	RTL Television	
	Total viewership	16,160,000		

Sporting positions
Regional boxing titles
Vacant Title last held by Alexey Ilyin	WBC International cruiserweight champion 17 August 1996 – 21 February 1998; Won world title	Vacant Title next held by Vassiliy Jirov
Vacant Title last held by J. D. Chapman	WBC Latino heavyweight champion 10 February 2007 – July 2007; Vacated	Vacant Title next held by Fres Oquendo
Vacant Title last held by Kali Meehan	PABA heavyweight champion 16 June 2007 – October 2007; Vacated	Vacant Title next held by Friday Ahunanya
Preceded by Oliver McCall	WBC International heavyweight champion 19 October 2007 – 27 September 2008; Won world title eliminator	Vacant Title next held by Odlanier Solís
Vacant Title last held by Alexander Ustinov	WBA International heavyweight champion 27 March 2010 – December 2010; Vacated	Vacant Title next held by Jean-Marc Mormeck
Vacant Title last held by Grigory Drozd	WBA International cruiserweight champion 6 July 2014 – 28 November 2014	Succeeded by Dmitry Kudryashov
World boxing titles
Preceded by Marcelo Domínguez	WBC cruiserweight champion 21 February 1998 – 19 February 2002; Vacated	Vacant Title next held by Wayne Braithwaite
