= Anaclet Wamba =

Congolese boxer

Personal information
- Nationality: French
- Born: 6 January 1960 (age 66) Liranga, French Equatorial Africa
- Height: 190 cm (6 ft 3 in)
- Weight: Cruiserweight; Light Heavyweight

Boxing career
- Reach: 201 cm (79 in)

Boxing record
- Total fights: 49
- Wins: 46
- Win by KO: 23
- Losses: 2
- Draws: 1

Anaclet Wamba (born January 6, 1960) is a Congolese-French former professional boxer who competed from 1982 to 1994. He held the WBC Cruiserweight title from 1991 until 1994.

== Amateur career ==
Wamba had a notable amateur career. He represented the People's Republic of the Congo in the 1980 Moscow Olympic Games, as a Light Heavyweight where he lost to Benny Pike (Australia) in the round of 16.

== Professional career ==
Wamba turned pro in 1982 and in 1990 landed a shot at WBC Cruiserweight Title holder Massimiliano Duran, but lost via disqualification in the 12th round. Wamba had been penalized a total of five points before he was disqualified. He was given a rematch with Duran the following year, and won the belt via TKO. He defended his belt seven times before being stripped, and he subsequently retired.

Wamba became EBU (European Boxing Union) cruiserweight Champion in 1989 in a win over Angelo Rottoli in Perugia, Umbria, Italy. He then went on to win the WBC (World Boxing Council) cruiserweight championship in a win over Massimiliano Duran in Palermo, Sicily, Italy, in 1991 and was stripped from the title in April 1996 for being overweight before his fight against Marcelo Domínguez.

== Professional boxing record ==
| 49 fights | 46 wins | 2 losses |
|---|---|---|
| By knockout | 23 | 0 |
| By decision | 22 | 1 |
| By disqualification | 1 | 1 |
| Draws | 1 | |

| No. | Result | Record | Opponent | Type | Round, time | Date | Location | Notes |
|---|---|---|---|---|---|---|---|---|
| 49 | Win | 46–2–1 | (Dominican Republic) Perfecto Gonzalez | TKO | 4 (8) | 30 Dec 1994 | Pointe-a-Pitre, Guadeloupe | |
| 48 | Win | 45–2–1 | (Argentina) Marcelo Domínguez | MD | 12 | 3 Dec 1994 | Salta, Argentina | Retained WBC cruiserweight title |
| 47 | Win | 44–2–1 | (United States) Charles Dixon | KO | 1 (10) | 11 Nov 1994 | San Miguel de Tucumán, Argentina | |
| 46 | Draw | 43–2–1 | (United States) Adolpho Washington | MD | 12 | 14 Jul 1994 | Monte Carlo, Monaco | Retained WBC cruiserweight title |
| 45 | Win | 43–2 | (United States) Mike DeVito | TKO | 4 (12) | 24 Apr 1994 | Limoges, France | |
| 44 | Win | 42–2 | (France) Akim Tafer | RTD | 7 (12), 3:00 | 16 Oct 1993 | Levallois-Perret, France | Retained WBC cruiserweight title |
| 43 | Win | 41–2 | (United States) Carlton West | TKO | 4 (?) | 23 Apr 1993 | Saint-Brieuc, France | |
| 42 | Win | 40–2 | (United States) David Vedder | UD | 12 | 6 Mar 1993 | Levallois-Perret, France | Retained WBC cruiserweight title |
| 41 | Win | 39–2 | (United States) Andrew Maynard | UD | 12 | 16 Oct 1992 | Paris, France | |
| 40 | Win | 38–2 | (United States) John Keys | KO | 2 (?) | 18 Jul 1992 | Pointe-a-Pitre, Guadeloupe | |
| 39 | Win | 37–2 | (Russia) Andrey Rudenko | TKO | 5 (12), 2:00 | 13 Jun 1992 | Levallois-Perret, France | Retained WBC cruiserweight title |
| 38 | Win | 36–2 | (France) Filip Polanco | KO | 2 (?) | 30 Apr 1992 | Pointe-a-Pitre, Guadeloupe | |
| 37 | Win | 35–2 | (United States) Ricky Parkey | KO | 8 (12) | 4 Apr 1992 | Levallois-Perret, France | |
| 36 | Win | 34–2 | (Italy) Massimiliano Duran | TKO | 11 (12), 1:16 | 13 Dec 1991 | Paris, France | Retained WBC cruiserweight title |
| 35 | Win | 33–2 | (Italy) Massimiliano Duran | TKO | 11 (12), 0:42 | 20 Jul 1991 | Palermo, Italy | Won WBC cruiserweight title |
| 34 | Win | 32–2 | (United States) Rocky Bentley | DQ | 7 (?) | 12 May 1991 | Voiron, France | |
| 33 | Win | 31–2 | (United States) Tim Tomashek | PTS | 8 | 24 Mar 1991 | Annecy, France | |
| 32 | Loss | 30–2 | (Italy) Massimiliano Duran | DQ | 12 (12), 2:51 | 8 Dec 1990 | Ferrara, Italy | For WBC cruiserweight title |
| 31 | Win | 30–1 | (United States) Andre Crowder | KO | 8 (?) | 20 Oct 1990 | Saint-Brieuc, France | |
| 30 | Win | 29–1 | (Suriname) John Held | PTS | 8 | 20 Jan 1990 | Saint-Brieuc, France | |
| 29 | Win | 28–1 | (United States) Bruce Johnson | TKO | 3 (8) | 30 Dec 1989 | Amiens, France | |
| 28 | Win | 27–1 | (United States) Angelo Rottoli | SD | 12 | 11 Nov 1989 | Perugia, Italy | Won EBU cruiserweight title |
| 27 | Win | 26–1 | (Sierra Leone) David Muhammed | KO | 4 (?) | 22 Apr 1989 | Saint-Brieuc, France | |
| 26 | Win | 25–1 | (United States) Elvis Parks | KO | 3 (8) | 25 Mar 1989 | Casablanca, Morocco | |
| 25 | Win | 24–1 | (Ivory Coast) Boubakar Sanogo | PTS | 8 | 25 Feb 1989 | Saint-Brieuc, France | |
| 24 | Win | 23–1 | (United States) Rick Enis | KO | 5 (?) | 21 Nov 1988 | Forges-les-Eaux, France | |
| 23 | Win | 22–1 | (Belgium) Yves Monsieur | PTS | 8 | 26 Jun 1988 | Compiegne, France | |
| 22 | Win | 21–1 | (United States) Greg Gorrell | TKO | 1 (?) | 23 Apr 1988 | Berck-sur-Mer, France | |
| 21 | Win | 20–1 | (Belgium) Yves Monsieur | PTS | 8 | 19 Mar 1988 | Saint-Brieuc, France | |
| 20 | Win | 19–1 | (United States) Kevin P Porter | PTS | 8 | 10 Oct 1987 | Paris, France | |
| 19 | Win | 18–1 | (United Kingdom) Stewart Lithgo | TKO | 2 (8) | 25 Oct 1986 | Saint-Brieuc, France | |
| 18 | Win | 17–1 | (Ghana) Joe Kalala | PTS | 6 | 16 May 1986 | Abidjan, Ivory Coast | |
| 17 | Win | 16–1 | (United Kingdom) Chris Jacobs | PTS | 8 | 12 Apr 1986 | Saint-Brieuc, France | |
| 16 | Win | 15–1 | (United Kingdom) John Westgarth | PTS | 10 | 20 Feb 1986 | (United Kingdom) Newcastle upon Tyne, England | |
| 15 | Win | 14–1 | (Belgium) Albert Syben | PTS | 8 | 25 Jan 1986 | Saint-Brieuc, France | |
| 14 | Loss | 13–1 | (United Kingdom) Horace Notice | PTS | 8 | 16 Oct 1985 | Saint-Brieuc, France | |
| 13 | Win | 13–0 | (Cameroon) Louis Pergaud | PTS | 8 | 27 Apr 1985 | Saint-Brieuc, France | |
| 12 | Win | 12–0 | (United Kingdom) Dave Garside | PTS | 8 | 20 Apr 1985 | Saint-Malo, France | |
| 11 | Win | 11–0 | (United Kingdom) Andrew Gerrard | PTS | 8 | 26 Jan 1985 | Saint-Brieuc, France | |
| 10 | Win | 10–0 | (Cameroon) Louis Pergaud | PTS | 8 | 13 Oct 1984 | Saint-Brieuc, France | |
| 9 | Win | 9–0 | (Zaire) Ali Lukasa | PTS | 8 | 5 May 1984 | Saint-Brieuc, France | |
| 8 | Win | 8–0 | (United Kingdom) Winston Allen | PTS | 8 | 14 Apr 1984 | Yffiniac, France | |
| 7 | Win | 7–0 | (United Kingdom) Rocky Burton | TKO | 3 (8) | 10 Mar 1984 | Saint-Brieuc, France | |
| 6 | Win | 6–0 | (Senegal) Maurice Gomis | TKO | 7 (?) | 14 Jan 1984 | Saint-Brieuc, France | |
| 5 | Win | 5–0 | (Italy) Marco Vitaglione | PTS | 8 | 26 Nov 1983 | Saint-Brieuc, France | |
| 4 | Win | 4–0 | (Belgium) Luc Goossens | TKO | 1 (?) | 22 Oct 1983 | Saint-Brieuc, France | |
| 3 | Win | 3–0 | (France) Ahcene Refjas | TKO | 6 (?) | 22 Apr 1983 | Saint-Brieuc, France | |
| 2 | Win | 2–0 | (Zaire) Hosanna Fefe Mobana | PTS | 6 | 27 Mar 1983 | Saint-Brieuc, France | |
| 1 | Win | 1–0 | (France) Guy Telusson | KO | 1 (?) | 27 Nov 1982 | Saint-Brieuc, France | |

== See also ==
- List of WBC world champions

Sporting positions
World boxing titles
| Preceded by Massimiliano Duran | WBC cruiserweight champion 20 July 1991 – 19 April 1996; Stripped | Succeeded by Marcelo Dominguez promoted from interim status |
