= Guy Waters =

Australian boxer

Personal information
- Nickname: Arc Angel
- Nationality: Australian
- Born: 25 January 1964 (age 62) London, England
- Height: 6 ft 2 in (188 cm)
- Weight: super middle/light heavy/cruiserweight

Boxing career
- Reach: 75 in (191 cm)
- Stance: Orthodox

Boxing record
- Total fights: 33
- Wins: 25 (KO 11)
- Losses: 7 (KO 5)
- Draws: 1

Guy "Arc Angel" Waters (born 25 January 1964) is an Australian professional welter/light middle/middle/super middle/light heavy/cruiserweight boxer of the 1980s, 1990s and 2000s. He won the New South Wales State (Australia) light heavyweight title, Australian light heavyweight title, Oriental and Pacific Boxing Federation (OPBF) light heavyweight title, Australasian Light Heavyweight Title, World Boxing Federation (WBF) light heavyweight title, International Boxing Federation (IBF) Pan Pacific super middleweight title, Oriental and Pacific Boxing Federation (OPBF) super middleweight title, and Commonwealth light heavyweight title. He was also a challenger for the WBC light heavyweight title against Dennis Andries, World Boxing Association (WBA) World light heavyweight title against Virgil Hill, World Boxing Council (WBC) cruiserweight title against Juan Carlos Gómez, and Commonwealth super middleweight title against David Starie. His professional fighting weight varied from 167 1/2 lb (76.0 kg; 11 st 13.5 lb), i.e. super middleweight to 185 1/4 lb (84.0 kg; 13 st 3.3 lb), i.e. cruiserweight.
