= Roy Smith (boxer) =

English boxer

Personal information
- Nationality: British
- Born: 31 August 1961 (age 65) Nottingham, England
- Height: 6 ft 0 in (1.83 m)
- Weight: Cruiserweight

Boxing career

Boxing record
- Total fights: 26
- Wins: 18
- Win by KO: 5
- Losses: 8
- Draws: 0

Roy Smith (born 31 August 1961) is a British former boxer who was British cruiserweight champion in 1987.

Born in Nottingham, Smith began his professional career in January 1985 and was managed by Wally Swift. After winning his first eight fights he fought Roy Skeldon for the vacant Midlands Area cruiserweight title in November 1985, taking the title on points. He suffered his first defeat two months later to Sammy Reeson. After four wins from his next five fights he got a shot at Andy Straughn's British title in February 1987; Smith won on points to take the title. His first defence came three months later and Tee Jay stopped him in the first round to take the title. In the eight fights that followed, Smith won three and lost five. He regained the Midlands Area title in May 1988 and successfully defended it in March 1991 but lost it only 18 days later. His chances of another shot at the British title were effectively ended when he was stopped in the second round by Derek Angol in October 1988 after being knocked down three times. He retired from boxing in 1991.
