= Franco Wanyama =

Ugandan boxer (1968–2019)

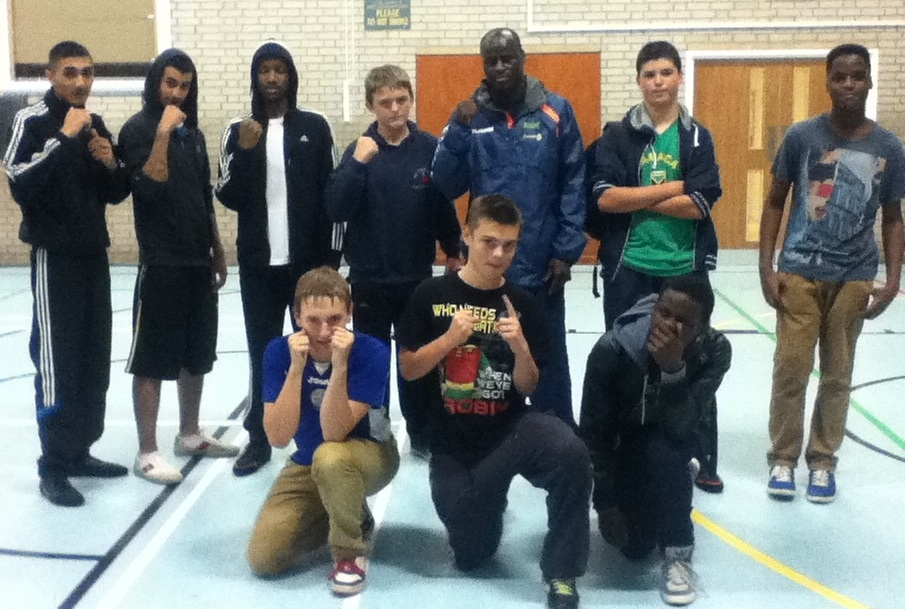
- Franco and his students in 2013

Personal information
- Nickname: Thunderbird
- Nationality: Ugandan
- Born: Franco Wanyama; 7 February 1968 Kampala, Uganda
- Died: 21 March 2019 (aged 51) Rugby, Warwickshire
- Height: 6 ft 3 in (1.91 m)
- Weight: Middleweight; Cruiserweight; Heavyweight

Boxing career
- Reach: 75 in (191 cm)
- Stance: Orthodox

Boxing record
- Total fights: 29
- Wins: 20
- Win by KO: 7
- Losses: 7
- Draws: 2

Franco "Thunderbird" Wanyama (7 February 1968 – 21 March 2019) was a Ugandan professional boxer who competed from 1989 to 2000. He competed in the middleweight, cruiserweight and heavyweight division. He was an amateur representative of Uganda at middleweight in the Boxing at the 1988 Summer Olympics in Seoul, South Korea, losing to eventual bronze medal winner Chris Sande of Kenya, and as a professional won the BeNeLux heavyweight title, BeNeLux cruiserweight title, Commonwealth cruiserweight title, and World Boxing Federation (WBF) cruiserweight title, and was a challenger for the Commonwealth cruiserweight title against Chris Okoh. His professional fighting weight varied from 181 lb (82 kg; 12 st 13 lb), i.e. cruiserweight to 192 lb (87 kg; 13 st 10 lb), i.e. heavyweight. Wanyama defeated notable fighters such as Jimmy Thunder, Carl Thompson and Johnny Nelson and was sparring partner to Vitali Klitschko & Wladimir Klitschko. He lived his last years in Rugby, Warwickshire, England and had 3 children, Shannon Wanyama, Nellie Wanyama and Wanga Wanyama.

== Early life ==
Franco started boxing around the age of 6 after becoming curious of what was inside a local boxing gym.

== Professional career ==
Franco made his professional debut on 25 December 1989 against Dutch fighter John Held (7–13–2) it ended a 6-round points draw. In 1990 he defeated future world title holder Carl Thompson on points. In 1993 he won a bout against another future world champion, Johnny Nelson, who was disqualified for repeated holding. In 1995 he was matched with former world champion Thomas Hearns but the fight was called off at the last minute and Hearns was replaced by ranked Heavyweight Jimmy Thunder, Wanyama and gave away 30 pounds in weight but still came away with a points victory.

== Later years ==
After his retirement Franco worked as a sparring partner, notably with the Klitschko brothers. From 2007 he became a youth worker and boxing coach in Rugby, taking classes for the youth service whilst also being a coach at a local amateur boxing gym. On 21 March 2019, Franco had a heart attack and died at his home in Rugby at the age of 51.

== Professional boxing record ==
29 fights	20 wins	7 losses
By knockout	7	5
By decision	13	2
Draws	2	

No.	Result	Record	Opponent	Type	Round, time	Date	Location	Notes
29	Win	20–7–2	(Hungary) Csaba Olah	TKO	3 (6)	2000-06-16	Ghent, Belgium	
28	Win	19–7–2	(Czech Republic) Daniel Jerling	PTS	6	1999-10-15	Ghent, Belgium	
27	Win	18–7–2	(Belgium) Geert Blieck	MD	6	1999-04-05	Ghent, Belgium	
26	Win	17–7–2	(Uganda) Abdul Kadou	PTS	10	1997-12-25	Nakivubo Stadium, Kampala, Uganda	
25	Loss	16–7–2	(Belgium) Dirk Wallyn	TKO	5 (8)	1996-12-25	(United Kingdom) Izegem, Belgium	
24	Loss	16–6–2	(Belgium) Dirk Wallyn	TKO	7 (8)	1996-11-01	(United Kingdom) Izegem, Belgium	
23	Loss	16–5–2	(United Kingdom) Garry Delaney	PTS	6	1996-02-06	(United Kingdom) Festival Hall, Basildon, England	
22	Loss	16–4–2	(United Kingdom) Chris Okoh	TKO	8 (12)	1995-09-29	(United Kingdom) York Hall, Bethnal Green, England	For vacant Commonwealth (British Empire) Cruiserweight title.
21	Win	16–3–2	(New Zealand) James Thunder	SD	10	1995-07-16	(United States) Cobo Arena, Detroit, Michigan, U.S.	
20	Draw	15–3–2	(Bulgaria) Kalin Stoyanov	PTS	8	1994-04-02	De Haan, Belgium	
19	Win	15–3–1	(United Kingdom) Tony Booth	TKO	2 (12)	1994-01-28	Waregem, Belgium	Won vacant Commonwealth (British Empire) Cruiserweight title.
18	Win	14–3–1	(Jamaica) Bobbie Joe Edwards	PTS	8	1993-12-25	Izegem, Belgium	
17	Win	13–3–1	(United Kingdom) Johnny Nelson	DQ	10 (12)	1993-10-01	Waregem, Belgium	Won WBF (Federation) Cruiserweight title. Nelson disqualified for repeated fouls.
16	Win	12–3–1	(Bulgaria) Daniel Krumov	TD	2 (6)	1993-04-23	Waregem, Belgium	
15	Win	11–3–1	(Netherlands) John Held	UD	10	1993-01-29	Waregem, Belgium	Won BeNeLux Cruiserweight title.
14	Win	10–3–1	(United Kingdom) Tony Booth	PTS	6	1992-12-25	Izegem, Belgium	
13	Win	9–3–1	(Colombia) Faustino Gonzalez	TKO	3 (6)	1992-11-01	Izegem, Belgium	
12	Win	8–3–1	(Russia) Vladimir Dyukarev	TKO	1 (6)	1992-10-02	Waregem, Belgium	
11	Loss	7–3–1	(Netherlands) John Emmen	KO	10 (10)	1991-06-24	Weenahal, Rotterdam, Netherlands	For BeNeLux Heavyweight title.
10	Win	7–2–1	(Netherlands) Ramon Voorn	PTS	10	1991-02-18	Sportcentrum Valkencourt, Valkenswaard, Netherlands	
9	Win	6–2–1	(Ivory Coast) Boubakar Sanogo	PTS	8	1990-12-25	Izegem, Belgium	
8	Loss	5–2–1	(France) Norbert Ekassi	KO	2 (8)	1990-10-13	Ghent, Belgium	
7	Win	5–1–1	(United Kingdom) Ian Bulloch	TKO	5 (6)	1990-05-12	Waasmunster, Belgium	
6	Win	4–1–1	(United Kingdom) Carl Thompson	PTS	6	1990-04-21	Sint-Amandsberg, Belgium	
5	Win	3–1–1	(Algeria) Mohamed Zaoui	TKO	3 (6)	1990-04-07	Carvin, France	
4	Loss	2–1–1	(France) Christophe Girard	PTS	8	1990-03-16	Blois, France	
3	Win	2–0–1	(Guadeloupe) Serge Bolivard	PTS	6	1990-02-10	Roeselare, Belgium	
2	Win	1–0–1	(United Kingdom) Abner Blackstock	TKO	4 (6)	1990-01-12	Waregem, Belgium	
1	Draw	0–0–1	(Netherlands) John Held	PTS	6	1989-12-25	Izegem, Belgium	Professional debut
