= Stewart Lithgo =

English boxer

Personal information
- Nationality: English
- Born: Edward Stewart Lithgo; 2 June 1957 (age 69) Hartlepool, England
- Height: 6 ft 4 1/2 in (1.94 m)
- Weight: cruiser/heavyweight

Boxing career

Boxing record
- Total fights: 30
- Wins: 16 (KO 7)
- Losses: 12 (KO 8)
- Draws: 2

Stewart Lithgo (born 2 June 1957) is an English former professional boxer who competed from 1979 to 1987. He won the British Boxing Board of Control (BBBofC) Northern (England) Area heavyweight title, and inaugural Commonwealth cruiserweight title, and was a challenger for the BBBofC Northern (England) Area heavyweight title against Paul Lister, and BBBofC British cruiserweight title against Sammy Reeson, his professional fighting weight varied from 184 lb (83 kg; 13 st 2 lb), i.e. cruiserweight to 203 lb (92 kg; 14 st 7 lb), i.e. heavyweight.
