= Struthers Fieldhouse =

Arena in Ohio, United States

Struthers Memorial Fieldhouse
- Struthers Fieldhouse
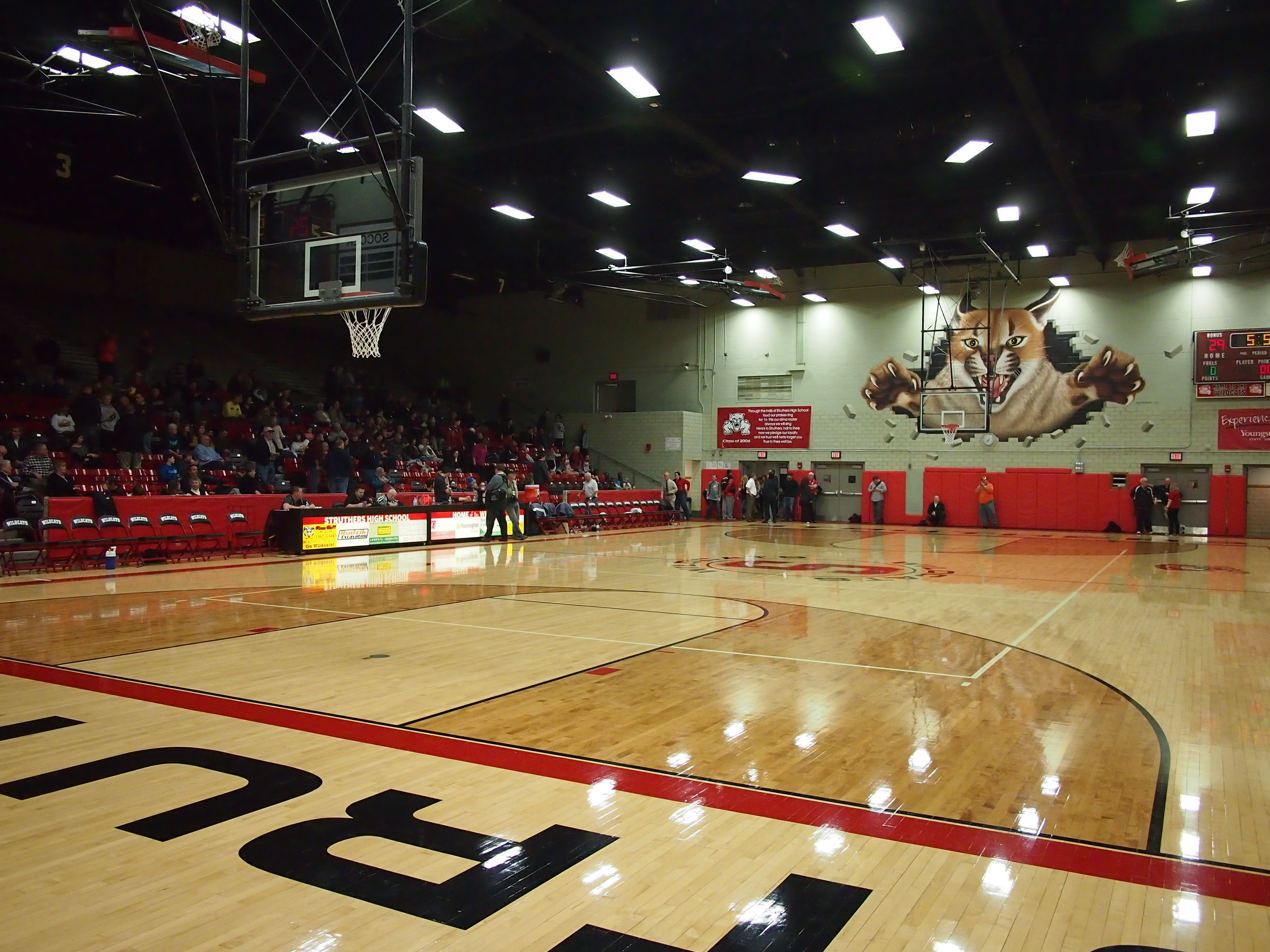
- Interactive map of Struthers Memorial Fieldhouse
- Location: 111 Euclid Avenue; Struthers, Ohio 44471
- Owner: Struthers City School District
- Operator: Struthers City School District
- Capacity: 3,000

Construction
- Groundbreaking: 1950
- Opened: December 18, 1951

Tenant
- Struthers High School Wildcats

The Struthers Memorial Fieldhouse, or simply Struthers Fieldhouse, is a 3,000-seat multi-purpose arena in Struthers, Ohio. It was dedicated on December 18, 1951 and primarily serves as the home gymnasium to the connected Struthers High School athletic programs. Throughout its history it has been an entertainment and sports venue that serves the larger Youngstown, Ohio metro area.

== Basketball ==
The gym is home to the Struthers High School boys and girls basketball programs and also has hosted Ohio High School Athletic Association tournaments for many years. A Struthers and Campbell boys basketball game played in the gym was featured on the cover of a March 1963 edition of Boys' Life magazine.

== Boxing ==
Professional boxing cards at the gym go back as far as 1957. Former world champions Harry Arroyo, Ray Mancini, Héctor Camacho and Kelly Pavlik are among the fighters who competed at the venue.

== Professional Wrestling ==
The World Wrestling Federation used the gym for several matches in the 1980s and 90s. May 23, 1994 and June 5, 1995 episodes of the WWF's Monday Night Raw program were taped in the gym.

== Music ==
Before the opening of the Beeghly Center on the campus of Youngstown State University in 1972, the Fieldhouse was one of the largest indoor rock concert venues in the Youngstown, Ohio area. James Brown, The Velvet Underground, Yes, The Guess Who, and Alice Cooper are among the acts to perform at the Fieldhouse. More recently, a 2004 concert headlined by Trapt and also featuring Smile Empty Soul, Finger Eleven, and Strata was a successful venture for Eric Ryan Productions. Additionally Flyleaf with Shinedown, Seether, and Halestorm at Struthers Fieldhouse (February 19, 2006)

== Television ==
Parts of the Route 66 episode "The Opponent" were shot in the Fieldhouse in the fall of 1960. The gym, hallways and locker rooms were used in the production.

== Coordinates ==
41°3′6.94″N 80°35′54.66″W
