= Akim Tafer =

French boxer

Personal information
- Nationality: (France) French; (Algeria) Algerian
- Born: Hakim Tafer; August 27, 1967 (age 59) La Tronche, France
- Height: 6 ft 2 in (188 cm)
- Weight: Cruiserweight

Boxing career

Boxing record
- Total fights: 31
- Wins: 23
- Win by KO: 15
- Losses: 7
- Draws: 1

Hakim Tafer (Arabic: حكيم طافر) (born 27 August 1967) is a French-Algerian boxer. He is a three-time world title challenger.

== Career ==
The European Champion in the Cruiserweight division in 1992, 1993 and 1996, Tafer fought three times for the WBC World Championship: on October 16, 1993, against Anaclet Wamba (throw the towel in the 7th round) and twice against Marcelo Fabian Dominguez (by TKO and by points).

== Professional boxing record ==
23 Wins (15 knockouts, 8 decisions), 7 Losses (5 knockouts, 2 decisions), 1 Draw
Result	Record	Opponent	Type	Round	Date	Location	Notes
Draw	29-9-3	(Ukraine) Valeriy Vykhor	PTS	8	10/04/1999	(Île-de-France) Bercy, France	
Loss	21-1-1	(Argentina) Marcelo Fabian Dominguez	UD	12	16/08/1997	(Provence-Alpes-Côte d'Azur) La Palestre, Le Cannet, France	For WBC cruiserweight title
Win	11-1	(Ivory Coast) Onebo Maxime	PTS	8	01/02/1997	(Rhône-Alpes) Echirolles, France	
Win	18-0	(Russia) "Russian" Alexey Ilyin	TKO	4	25/05/1996	Yubileiny Sports Palace, Saint Petersburg, Russia	EBU Cruiserweight Title.
Win	22-7-3	(Ukraine) Valeriy Vykhor	PTS	8	30/01/1996	(Nord-Pas-de-Calais) Lille, France	
Loss	16-1-1	(Argentina) Marcelo Fabian Dominguez	TKO	9	25/07/1995	(Aquitaine) Saint-Jean-de-Luz, France	For WBC cruiserweight title
Win	6-3-1	(France) Eugene Taima	TKO	6	17/01/1995	(Île-de-France) Palais des sports Marcel Cerdan, Levallois-Perret, France	
Loss	15-3	(United Kingdom) Carl "The Cat" Thompson	TKO	6	14/06/1994	(Champagne-Ardenne) Epernay, France	EBU Cruiserweight Title.
Win	10-12-2	(United States) Ken "Doll" Jackson	KO	2	10/05/1994	(Rhône-Alpes) Echirolles, France	
Win	14-33-1	(United States) Roy Bedwell	KO	1	09/04/1994	(Rhône-Alpes) Albertville, France	
Loss	41-2	(France) Anaclet Wamba	TKO	7	16/10/1993	(Île-de-France) Palais Marcel Cerdan, Levallois-Perret, France	For WBC cruiserweight title
Win	22-16	(United States) Ricky Parkey	PTS	8	24/06/1993	(Aquitaine) Vélodrome du Lac, Bordeaux, France	
Win	4-1	(Ukraine) Dmytro Yeliseyev	KO	6	11/02/1993	(Centre-Val de Loire) Romorantin-Lanthenay, France	EBU Cruiserweight Title.
Win	26-1	(United Kingdom) Derek Angol	KO	10	22/10/1992	(Champagne-Ardenne) Epernay, France	EBU Cruiserweight Title.
Win	11-2-1	(Italy) Fernando Aiello	RTD	6	12/06/1992	(Lower Normandy) Alencon, France	EBU Cruiserweight Title.
Win	41-9-2	(United Kingdom) Dennis Andries	MD	12	27/02/1992	(Provence-Alpes-Côte d'Azur) Salle de la Bulle, Beausoleil, Alpes-Maritimes, France	EBU Cruiserweight Title. 116-113, 116-115, 116-116.
Win	6-3	(United States) Howard "Butch" Kelly	TKO	2	24/01/1992	(Île-de-France) Gennevilliers, France	
Win	8-5-1	(United States) Eddie "Vindaloo" Curry	KO	2	17/05/1991	(Upper Normandy) Dieppe, Seine-Maritime, France	
Win	8-5-1	(Ivory Coast) Boubakar Sanogo	KO	2	19/04/1991	(Provence-Alpes-Côte d'Azur) Marignane, France	France Cruiserweight Title.
Win	10-7	(United States) Carl "Little Truth" Williams	KO	5	16/02/1991	(Aquitaine) Gaillard, France	
Win	8-3-1	(Ivory Coast) Boubakar Sanogo	TKO	4	19/05/1990	(Languedoc-Roussillon) Montpellier, France	France Cruiserweight Title.
Win	7-1	(Italy) Fernando Aiello	PTS	8	20/04/1990	Guastalla, Italy	
Win	0-5	(Luxembourg) Ngoy Muamba	PTS	6	07/04/1990	(Rhône-Alpes) Echirolles, France	
Loss	3-1	(Algeria) Mohamed Zaoui	TKO	5	18/11/1989	(Rhône-Alpes) Echirolles, France	
Win	0-1	(France) Paul Gimenez	PTS	6	11/03/1989	(Languedoc-Roussillon) Perpignan, France	
Loss	2-0	(France) Christophe Girard	PTS	6	25/02/1989	(Centre-Val de Loire) Romorantin-Lanthenay, France	
Win	--	(France) Germain Djida	PTS	6	16/12/1988	(Rhône-Alpes) Echirolles, France	
Win	4-1	(France) Jean Marc Dindin	TKO	3	26/11/1988	(Rhône-Alpes) Pontcharra, France	
Win	1-2	(Morocco) Hassan Jalni	TKO	6	19/11/1988	(Rhône-Alpes) Echirolles, France	
Win	--	(France) Pascal Neodo	TKO	4	21/10/1988	(Rhône-Alpes) Echirolles, France	
Loss	1-2-1	(France) Norbert Ekassi	TKO	3	03/10/1988	(Île-de-France) Stade Pierre de Coubertin, Bercy, France	

== Trivia ==
Tafer is the uncle of the Algerian footballer Yannis Tafer.
