= Crawford Ashley =

English boxer

Personal information
- Nickname: Chilling
- Nationality: English
- Born: Gary Crawford; 20 May 1964 (age 62) Leeds, England
- Height: 6 ft 3 in (1.91 m)
- Weight: Super middleweight Light heavyweight Cruiserweight; Heavyweight

Boxing career
- Stance: Orthodox

Boxing record
- Total fights: 44
- Wins: 33
- Losses: 10
- Draws: 1

Crawford "Chilling" Ashley (born Gary Crawford, 20 May 1964) is an English former professional boxer who competed from 1987 to 2001. He held the European light heavyweight title twice between 1997 and 1999, the British title twice between 1991 and 1999 and the Commonwealth title from 1998 to 1999. He challenged for the World Boxing Association (WBA) super middleweight title in 1993 and the WBA light heavyweight title in 1995.
