= Sammy Reeson =

English boxer

Personal information
- Nationality: British
- Born: 5 January 1963 (age 63)
- Height: 6 ft 1.5 in (1.867 m)
- Weight: Light heavyweight, Cruiserweight

Boxing career
- Stance: Southpaw

Boxing record
- Total fights: 26
- Wins: 24
- Win by KO: 5
- Losses: 2
- Draws: 0

Sammy Reeson (born 5 January 1963) is a British former boxer who was the first to hold both the British and European cruiserweight titles and went on to fight for the WBC world title.

== Career ==
From Battersea, London, Reeson began his professional career in 1983 and won his first twelve fights before winning his first title, the Southern Area light heavyweight title that he won in January 1985 with a 6th round stoppage of Trevor Cattouse. In October 1985 he fought Stewart Lithgo for the newly introduced British cruiserweight title, winning on points over 12 rounds. He maintained his 100-percent win record until May 1986 when he was stopped in the 4th round by Louis Pergaud.

In April 1987 he met Manfred Jassmann for the chance to become the first EBU cruiserweight champion; Reeson became European champion on a unanimous decision. He successfully defended the title in November that year, beating Luigi Ricci via a 7th-round knockout.

In May 1989 he met Puerto Rican Carlos de León for the WBC cruiserweight title vacated by Evander Holyfield; De Leon stopped Reeson in the 9th round after knocking him down twice — only the second defeat of Reeson's 26-fight career. This proved to be Reeson's final fight.
