= Vitali Klitschko vs. Shannon Briggs =

Boxing match

Thunderstorm
- Date: 16 October 2010
- Venue: O2 World Hamburg, Altona, Hamburg, Germany
- Title(s) on the line: WBC heavyweight championship

Tale of the tape
| Boxer | Vitali Klitschko | Shannon Briggs |
| Nickname | Dr. Ironfist | The Cannon |
| Hometown | Kyiv, Ukraine | Brooklyn, New York, U.S. |
| Purse | | $750,000 |
| Pre-fight record | 40–2 (38 KO) | 51–5–1 (1) (45 KO) |
| Age | 39 years, 2 months | 38 years, 10 months |
| Height | 6 ft 7 in (201 cm) | 6 ft 4 in (193 cm) |
| Weight | 251 lb (114 kg) | 262 lb (119 kg) |
| Style | Orthodox | Orthodox |
| Recognition | WBC; Heavyweight Champion; The Ring; No. 1 Ranked Heavyweight | WBC; No. 8 Ranked Heavyweight; Former two time heavyweight champion |

Result
- Klitschko defeated Briggs by Unanimous Decision

Vitali Klitschko vs. Shannon Briggs, billed as Thunderstorm - Duell Der Knock-Outer (English: Duel of the Knock-Outers) was a professional boxing match contested on 16 October 2010, for the WBC heavyweight championship.

== Background ==
Since his return from retirement in 2008, Vitali Klitschko had made four successful defences in his second reign as WBC heavyweight champion, the last coming against Albert Sosnowski in May 2010. While he was negotiating for a bout with former WBO and lineal champion Shannon Briggs, after David Haye, Nikolai Valuev and Alexander Povetkin declined the bout, Vitali called out WBA titleholder Haye saying "Haye has twice jumped away because he is afraid. Haye doesn't want to fight, we [The Klitschkos] are ready to fight him anytime. We'll split the worldwide income 50-50 - I think that's fair. Right now David Haye is missing. If he's afraid to fight, he needs to tell everyone and stop the talk. If he's ready, let's sign the contract and talk in the ring with our fists, not with our mouths." After claiming to have signed a contract to fight Vitali, Briggs said "I look forward to retiring a great champion - I'm the best ever. Hopefully when I retire Vitali I can fight David Haye at Wembley Stadium, that would be a dream come true".

On 17 August, it was formally announced that Klitschko would defend his WBC title against Briggs on 16 October. During the build up Briggs recalled that during his post title hiatus from boxing it was a chance encounter with the champion in a Los Angeles restaurant that inspired his comeback saying "I was fat and he touched my stomach. And in that moment right there I decided to come back. He should have left me alone."

== The fight ==
Klitschko completely dismantled the challenger with superior hand speed, landing with multiple left-right combinations. Briggs struggled to land any meaningful punches, as Klitschko won every round decisively. After a few rounds, Briggs was receiving a vicious and sustained beating which caused him serious facial injuries. Considering the beating he was receiving, there was some suggestion that the referee should have stopped the bout during the last few rounds.

At the end of 12 rounds Klitschko retained his belt by unanimous decision, with official scores of 120–107, 120–107 and 120–105.

== Aftermath ==
During the post-fight interview, Briggs said: "I've fought George Foreman, I've fought Lennox Lewis, and Vitali's the best. He hits harder than Foreman, he's got incredibly fast hands. This was my best fight." Klitschko praised Briggs' durability saying "I am very surprised by how much he took, he's got a huge heart. I could not believe he was still standing after taking so many punches," he also said that Briggs deserved "a lot of respect."

While Klitschko did not knock down Briggs, the latter collapsed after the fight and was hospitalized with facial fractures and a torn biceps.

The fight averaged over 13 million viewers on RTL.

== Undercard ==
Confirmed bouts:

| Winner | Loser | Weight division/title belt(s) disputed | Result |
|---|---|---|---|
| (United Kingdom) Ola Afolabi | (Georgia (country)) Sandro Siproshvili | Cruiserweight (10 rounds) | Unanimous decision |
| (Russia) Zaurbek Baysangurov | (Portugal) Eugenio Monteiro | Middleweight (8 rounds) | 3rd round RTD |
| (Russia) Alexander Ustinov | (Turkey) Ozcan Cetinkaya | Heavyweight (8 rounds) | 2nd round TKO |
| (Serbia) Nenad Borovčanin | (Austria) Patrick Berger | Heavyweight (6 rounds) | 1st round TKO |
| (Turkey) Hizni Altunkaya | (Germany) Mathias Reinhardt | Cruiserweight (4 rounds) | 1st round TKO |

== Broadcasting ==
| Country | Broadcaster |
|---|---|
| Australia | One HD |
| Denmark | TV 2 |
| Germany | RTL |
| Hungary | Digi Sport |
| United Kingdom | Primetime |
| United States | ESPN3 |

| Preceded by vs. Albert Sosnowski | Vitali Klitschko's bouts 16 October 2010 | Succeeded by vs. Odlanier Solís |
| Preceded by vs. Rob Calloway | Shannon Briggs's bouts 16 October 2010 | Succeeded by vs. Maurenzo Smith |
