= Wladimir Klitschko vs. Sultan Ibragimov =

Boxing competition

The Unification
- Date: 23 February 2008
- Venue: Madison Square Garden in New York, New York
- Title(s) on the line: IBF/WBO/IBO Heavyweight Championships

Tale of the tape
Boxer	(Ukraine) Wladimir Klitschko	(Russia) Sultan Ibragimov
Nickname	"Dr. Steelhammer"	
Hometown	Kyiv, Kyiv Oblast, Ukraine	Rostov-on-Don, Rostov Oblast, Russia
Pre-fight record	49–3 (44 KO)	22–0–1 (17 KO)
Age	31 years, 10 months	32 years, 11 months
Height	6 ft 6 in (198 cm)	6 ft 2 in (188 cm)
Weight	238 lb (108 kg)	219 lb (99 kg)
Style	Orthodox	Southpaw
Recognition	IBF/IBO; Heavyweight Champion; The Ring; No. 1 Ranked Heavyweight	WBO; Heavyweight Champion; The Ring; No. 6 Ranked Heavyweight

Result
- Klitschko defeated Ibragimov by Unanimous Decision

Wladimir Klitschko vs. Sultan Ibragimov, billed as "The Unification", was a professional boxing match contested on 23 February 2008 for the IBF, WBO and IBO heavyweight championship.

== Background ==
After avenging an earlier defeat when he beat Lamon Brewster after 6 rounds in July 2007, Wladimir Klitschko had made three successful defences the IBF belt he had won from Chris Byrd in 2006, and was rated as the best heavyweight in the world by The Ring magazine (Sultan Ibragimov was 6th behind WBC Champion Oleg Maskaev and WBA Champion Ruslan Chagaev). Sultan Ibragimov won the WBO belt by beating Shannon Briggs before getting a decision over four time Former Champion Evander Holyfield. By the end of October 2007, Wladimir Klitschko started negotiations with Sultan Ibragimov about the unification showdown in the near future. This would be the first heavyweight unification fight since November 13, 1999 when WBC champion Lennox Lewis defeated then-WBA and IBF champion Evander Holyfield. On November 20, Klitschko and Ibragimov officially signed the contract for their unification clash to take place on February 23, 2008 at Madison Square Garden. Two days later in Moscow, a first pre-fight press-conference was held. Klitschko began his preparations for the fight on 18 December. His training camp was located between Santa Monica, Los Angeles and Palm Beach, Florida. Ibragimov began his preparations for the bout on 25 December. Among Ibragimov's sparring partners were Klitschko's former opponent Jameel McCline and Swedish heavyweight prospect Attila Levin.

In the pre-fight prediction, a vast majority of Ukrainian, Russian and American observers expected Klitschko to win by either stoppage or unanimous decision. Out of six journalists of the Ukrainian magazine Ring, five predicted Klitschko to stop Ibragimov, with only one expecting Klitschko to win by decision. 24 of 26 members of boxingscene.com expected Klitschko to come out as the winner – 18 of them predicted the win to come by way of KO/TKO, one expert predicted decision, while the remaining five were unsure about either possibility. The remaining two experts predicted Ibragimov to win by decision. 10 of the 12 members of ringsidereport.com picked Klitschko to win, with eight of them expecting the victory to come by way of KO/TKO. The remaining two picked Ibragimov to win by stoppage, with one of them saying that Ibragimov was more resilient psychologically and could withstand Klitschko's power. In the build-up to the fight, Klitschko's trainer Emmanuel Steward said that Sultan Ibragimov was going to be Wladimir's toughest opponent to date, praising Ibragimov for his hand speed and mobility, while Klitschko complimented Ibragimov on his accomplishments: "Sultan Ibragimov is a boxer that hasn't lost in any of his 23 fights, with the sole draw being against Ray Austin. His amateur career can be described as fantastic, and the fact that he's the heavyweight champion of the world speaks volumes about his professional career as well. I think he's a strong and dangerous opponent that should not be underestimated. His last two fights against Shannon Briggs and Evander Holyfield proved that." Ibragimov's trainer Jeff Mayweather was confident that Ibragimov would be able to establish his rhythm and "press Klitschko to the corner". The pre-fight build-up was marked with controversy after Ibragimov's manager Boris Grinberg insulted Klitschko during one of the interviews: "Sultan Ibragimov knocks out this Ukraine gay, motherf***er!". Grinberg later apologized to Klitschko. The day before the bout, Klitschko weighed in at 238 pounds (108 kg), the lightest since 1999, while Ibragimov's weight was 219 pounds (99 kg), his lightest since 2005.

== The fight ==
From the opening bell, both fighters fought tentatively, avoiding risks. Klitschko retreated onto the outside, fighting at a distance and remaining invulnerable for Ibragimov who tried to establish his right jab but had his right hand constantly pushed down by Klitschko. By the end of the opening round, Klitschko became more active with his jab, while Ibragimov unsuccessfully tried to catch Wladimir with a series of right and left hooks. By the third round, Klitschko took control of the center of the ring, keeping Ibragimov at the end of his left jab and occasionally throwing right jabs as well. In the fifth round, Klitschko caught Ibragimov with a straight right hand, however Ibragimov appeared to be unhurt. Most of Ibragimov's attempts to close distance ended with Klitschko tying him up. In the second half of the fight, the situation did not change, with Klitschko keeping Ibragimov at distance with straight shots, while Ibragimov was only able to occasionally catch Klitschko with single shots to the body. Ibragimov's corner was almost silent from the sixth round onwards, unable to give their man any meaningful advice. Klitschko's dominance became even more visible after he caught Ibragimov with a straight right in round nine, almost knocking him down. He caught Ibragimov again with a counter left hook at the end of the eleventh. The twelfth round saw Ibragimov unsuccessfully trying to catch Klitschko with overhand shots. Ultimately, the fight went the distance, with Klitschko being declared the winner by unanimous decision. The judges scored the bout 119–110, 117–111 and 118–110.

== Reception ==
The fight was heavily criticized by observers and prominent boxing public figures. Boxing promoter Bob Arum called the fight "an absolute shame", while Dan Goossen described it as "awful". Boxing journalist Phil Santos pointed out that Klitschko fought for the majority of the fight "only with his left hand", proving once again that he "is the best heavyweight in the world right now". Santos also noted that such cautious, safety-first style was not going to help Klitschko to increase his popularity in the United States. Some observers were more apologetic of Klitschko's performance: "It's really irritating that so many people, people that know very little about boxing, say that Klitschko's dominance means stagnation for the heavyweight division. There's no denying that once Klitschko collects all the belts, he will go down as one of the all-time greats. Yes, he fights cautiously and isn't willing to exchange shots, but who told us that greatness in boxing is measured with the number of knockdowns? Why the boxer that is able to not get hit with a hard shot over the course of twelve rounds is less great than the champions from the past that sacrificed their health for the sake of success?"

== Aftermath ==
Years later when talking about the fight, Ibragimov admitted that in the middle rounds he had realized that he was going to lose: "We were very well prepared for the fight, our game plan was built around counterpunching, and I was patiently waiting for Klitschko to throw a straight right hand. But credit to him and his trainer Emmanuel Steward, for the first seven rounds Klitschko did not throw a single right hand. Basically, Klitschko's team prepared Wladimir to keep the fight away from tight quarters. And when the opponent doesn't want to fight aggressively and has a big advantage in height and reach, his job is a lot easier. In the middle of the fight I realized that I had already lost."

Sultan Ibragimov would not return to the ring, announcing his retirement in July 2009. The decision was caused by Ibragimov's chronic problems with his left hand. Meanwhile Klitschko would go on hold the WBO belt until his 2015 defeat to Tyson Fury.

== Undercard ==
Confirmed bouts:

Winner	Loser	Weight division/title belt(s) disputed	Result
(United States) Joe Greene	(Argentina) Francisco Antonio Mora	WBA-NABA Middleweight Title; WBO-NABO Middleweight Title	10th round RTD.
(United States) Johnathon Banks	(United States) Imamu Mayfield	Cruiserweight (10 rounds)	1st round TKO.
(Republic of Ireland) John Duddy	(Tunisia) Walid Smichet	Middleweight (10 rounds)	Majority decision.
(United States) Peter Quillin	(United States) Thomas Brown	Middleweight (6 rounds)	2nd round KO.
(Russia) Alexander Ustinov	(United States) Earl Ladson	Heavyweight (4 rounds)	1st round KO.
(Venezuela) Ronney Vargas	(United States) Monyette Flowers	Super Welterweight (4 rounds)	1st round KO.

== Broadcasting ==
In Russia, despite the time-zone difference, the fight averaged 9.5 million viewers, drawing a 7.5 rating in the 10+ demographic.

Country	Broadcaster
Australia	Main Event
Canada	Viewers Choice
France	Canal+
Germany	RTL
Hungary	RTL Klub
Russia	1 Kanal
Ukraine	Inter
United Kingdom	Sky Sports
United States	HBO

Preceded by vs. Lamon Brewster II	Wladimir Klitschko's bouts 23 February 2008	Succeeded by vs. Tony Thompson
Preceded by vs. Evander Holyfield	Sultan Ibragimov's bouts 23 February 2008	Retired
