= Calvin Brock =

American boxer (born 1975)

Personal information
- Nickname: The Boxing Banker
- Born: Calvin Vance Brock; January 22, 1975 (age 51) Charlotte, North Carolina, U.S.
- Height: 6 ft 2 in (188 cm)
- Weight: Heavyweight

Boxing career
- Reach: 77 in (196 cm)
- Stance: Orthodox

Boxing record
- Total fights: 33
- Wins: 31
- Win by KO: 23
- Losses: 2

Calvin Vance Brock (born January 22, 1975) is an American former professional boxer who competed from 2001 to 2007. He was ranked as the world's No.7 heavyweight by The Ring at the conclusion of 2005. Calvin Brock was trained by Tom Yankello. In 2006, he won Ring Magazine's Knockout of the Year for his win against Zuri Lawrence and challenged for the IBF and IBO heavyweight titles. Brock was forced to retire after receiving retinal damage in his right eye following his loss to Eddie Chambers.

== Early life ==
Brock was born and raised in Charlotte, North Carolina in a middle-class family. He became a fan of boxing as a kid, prompting his father to take him to the gym when he was 10 years old, where he was told to come back when he's 12. Brock returned to that gym five months after turning 12, losing his first six bouts. Brock earned a degree in finance from the University of North Carolina at Charlotte in 1999 and took a job as a banker in the Bank of America. He appeared in a Bank of America ad, in which he was referred to as "The Boxing Banker", which ultimately became his nickname. Brock soon left the job in order to concentrate on his boxing career.

== Amateur career ==
Brock had a notable amateur boxing career. He won the Golden Gloves heavyweight championship in 1998, and the United States national amateur super heavyweight championship in 1999. He qualified at the 2000 Summer Olympics super heavyweight tournament after narrowly beating one-time conqueror T.J.Wilson in the qualification, but lost to Paolo Vidoz in the first round. During the Olympics, he was a teammate of future world champions Jermain Taylor, Jeff Lacy, and Brian Viloria. Brock ended his amateur career with 147–38 record.

== Professional career ==
=== Early career ===
Brock made his professional debut on February 11, 2001, knocking out Zibielee Kimbrough in the third round. He built up a 23–0 record with 19 knockouts before stepping up in competition, facing Clifford Etienne. Etienne, once highly regarded prospect, was looking for a way to regain his stock after being knocked out by Mike Tyson and Fres Oquendo. Coming into the bout, Etienne was 5–0–1 in his last six fights. The bout took place at Reliant Center in Houston, Texas, and was aired on ESPN2. Brock knocked down Etienne three times, once in round two and twice in round three, with the referee stopping the fight after the third knockdown, declaring Brock the winner by third-round TKO.

Afterwards, Brock took a big step up in competition when he agreed to face Jameel McCline on 23 April, just three months after beating Etienne. McCline, ranked No.8 heavyweight in the world by The Ring at the time, was coming off of a razor-thin split decision loss to Chris Byrd for IBF world heavyweight title in what was described as an entertaining fight, and was viewed as the favorite coming into the Brock bout. The fight was scheduled to take place at Caesars Palace in Las Vegas, Nevada and was televised on ESPN as part of the undercard of the pay-per-view fight between Antonio Margarito and Kermit Cintrón. Brock weighed in at 218 pounds (99 kg) and was outweighed by McCline by 47 pounds (21 kg). The fight started with McCline trying to work behind the jab, while Brock tried to close the distance, working primarily McCline's body. In the middle rounds, Brock largely outboxed McCline using bob and weave strategy, but was knocked down in the seventh round with a short left hook followed by a right hand. Brock got up from the knockdown and finished the round strong and proceeded to outbox McCline for the remaining of the fight. The bout went full ten rounds, with Brock being declared the winner by unanimous decision (UD), with scores 97–93, 96–94 and 96–93. The fight was praised by critics, with prominent coach Teddy Atlas predicting a bright future for Brock in the heavyweight division. The win over McCline allowed Brock to enter The Ring heavyweight rankings. He was also ranked within top ten by all major sanctioning bodies. In an ESPN interview in July of that year, former world heavyweight champion Mike Tyson picked Brock and Samuel Peter as his favorite fighters from the new crop of heavyweights.

On November 19, 2005, Brock faced David Bostice for IBA Continental Americas heavyweight title, making it the first fight in Brock's professional career with a title, albeit lightly regarded, on the line. Bostice, who had a 35–9–1 record coming into the fight, was described as a "tough veteran", with most of his previous losses coming at the hands of former world heavyweight champions and contenders, such as Wladimir Klitschko, Tim Witherspoon, Francois Botha and Jeremy Williams. The fight took place at Cricket Arena in Charlotte, North Carolina, Brock's hometown. Both fighters fought aggressively from the opening bell, with Brock seemingly doing the better work in the early rounds, going back-and-forth between combinations to the head and body and not allowing Bostice to fire back. Brock appeared to be tired going into the middle rounds, fighting rather defensively, but picked up his pace after the seventh, hurting Bostice several times and almost stopping him in the ninth round. The twelfth round saw both fighters slugging it out, with the crowd chanting "Calvin! Calvin! Calvin!". The fight ultimately went the distance, with Brock being declared the winner by unanimous decision, with scores 118–110 (twice) and 116–112. The fight was widely praised for being a slugfest.

On February 25, 2006, in a stay-busy fight, Brock faced Zuri Lawrence on the undercard of the fight between Shane Mosley and Fernando Vargas on HBO PPV at Mandalay Bay Events Center in Las Vegas. Regarded by the public as an experienced journeyman with a record of 20 wins, 10 losses and 4 draws, Lawrence was coming off of upset victory over Jameel McCline. The first five rounds were tentative, with Brock slowly breaking Lawrence down and winning every round. At the end of the sixth round, Brock caught Lawrence with a left hook, knocking him out cold. Lawrence fell flat on his back and was unconscious for several minutes. Brock remains the only boxer to knock Lawrence out. The knockout received The Ring's KO of the Year award. At the conclusion of 2005, Brock was ranked No.7 heavyweight in the world by The Ring and No.9 heavyweight by BoxRec.

=== World title shot vs. Klitschko ===
With a 28–0 record, Brock was offered to fight Wladimir Klitschko for IBF world heavyweight championship in the summer of 2006 by Klitschko's advisor Shelly Finkel, but Brock declined citing disagreement with the offered terms. Instead, Brock opted to face undefeated prospect Timur Ibragimov on June 24, 2006. The fight took place at Caesars Palace in Las Vegas, Nevada, where Brock had previously defeated Jameel McCline, and was aired on HBO as part of the Boxing After Dark series. During the fight, the temperature exceeded 100 °F (38 °C), which resulted in each fighter unwilling to press the action. Brock ultimately won the bout by unanimous decision, with scores 119–109, 115–113 and 117–111. "His style was a contrast to mine. He was very cautious of being hit, always moving away. In the 6th or 7th round, I rocked him, he was hurt but not too hurt. He had a very good defense and was able to roll with punches. He surprised me because I didn't expect him keep his movement up for the whole fight. I thought at some point he would break down, but he kept running", Brock said after the fight. With a 29–0 (22 KOs) record, numerous boxing insiders considered Brock as one of the most promising American heavyweight prospects at the time, while ESPN journalist Dan Rafael claimed that "a number of promoters" were interested in signing Brock who became a free agent on July 27. Eventually Brock signed a new contract with Main Events on better terms.

Brock finally received a shot at the world title as he agreed to face Wladimir Klitschko for IBF world heavyweight championship. In the build-up to the fight, Brock was confident of his abilities to adapt to any style: "Klitschko has a good jab, but they also said Timur's best weapon was his jab. I have a good jab myself. I can adapt to anybody's style, anybody's strength and turn their weapon against them." He later added: "The heavyweight division is stacked with a bunch of talent. It's not weak, definitely not weak. The division is pretty strong and that's why the title keeps changing hands." The fight took place at Madison Square Garden on November 11, 2006. In the opening rounds, Brock's economical but effective movement made Klitschko reluctant to throw punches, with Wladimir being unable to fully establish his rhythm. In between the 3rd and 4th rounds, Klitschko's trainer Emmanuel Steward urged Wladimir to press the action. From the fourth round, Klitschko started fighting more aggressively, hurting Brock several times with the right cross. In the fifth round, Brock opened a cut under Klitschko's left eye that started bleeding heavily in the sixth. In round 7, Brock was caught with a counter right hand before being sent to the canvas with another straight right. Brock was able to get up but the referee stopped the bout, deciding that Brock is unable to continue.

=== Post Klitschko ===
After defeating two journeymen, Brock was given a spot in the 4-man elimination tournament to receive a shot at the IBF world heavyweight championship. In semifinals, Brock faced undefeated prospect Eddie Chambers. In the build-up to the fight, Brock claimed to be in the best shape of his career. Brock weighed in at 241 lbs, the heaviest in his entire career and almost 17 lbs heavier than in his bout against Klitschko. The additional weight appeared to be muscle. The fight took place at Emerald Queen Casino in Tacoma, Washington and was aired live on Showtime. Chambers appeared to have the upper hand in the fight, effectively using his hand speed and upper-body movement, and was declared the winner by split decision, with two judges scoring the bout 115–113 in favor of Chambers, while the third judge had the same score but in favor of Brock.

During this bout, Brock suffered retinal damage in his right eye. As a result of botched surgery to repair the damage in December 2007, Brock became legally blind in his right eye, and forced to retire permanently from the sport of boxing. Brock can still see images of daylight in the right eye.

== Personal life ==
Brock is now a commercial real estate agent. He has a wife, a daughter, and a son.

== Professional boxing record ==
33 fights	31 wins	2 losses
By knockout	23	1
By decision	8	1

No.	Result	Record	Opponent	Type	Round, time	Date	Location	Notes
33	Loss	31–2	Eddie Chambers	SD	12	Nov 2, 2007	Emerald Queen Casino, Tacoma, Washington, U.S.	
32	Win	31–1	Alex Gonzales	UD	8	Jun 2, 2007	Boardwalk Hall, Atlantic City, New Jersey, U.S.	
31	Win	30–1	Ralph West	KO	1 (10), 2:49	Mar 17, 2007	American Bank Center, Corpus Christi, Texas, U.S.	
30	Loss	29–1	Wladimir Klitschko	TKO	7 (12), 2:10	Nov 11, 2006	Madison Square Garden, New York City, New York, U.S.	For IBF and IBO heavyweight titles
29	Win	29–0	Timur Ibragimov	UD	12	Jun 24, 2006	Caesars Palace, Paradise, Nevada, U.S.	Won WBC FECARBOX heavyweight title
28	Win	28–0	Zuri Lawrence	KO	6 (10), 2:58	Feb 25, 2006	Mandalay Bay Resort & Casino, Paradise, Nevada, U.S.	
27	Win	27–0	David Bostice	UD	12	Nov 19, 2005	Cricket Arena, Charlotte, North Carolina, U.S.	
26	Win	26–0	Kenny Craven	TKO	4 (10), 2:34	Jun 25, 2005	Boardwalk Hall, Atlantic City, New Jersey, U.S.	
25	Win	25–0	Jameel McCline	UD	10	Apr 23, 2005	Caesars Palace, Paradise, Nevada, U.S.	
24	Win	24–0	Clifford Etienne	TKO	3 (10), 1:25	Jan 21, 2005	Reliant Center, Houston, Texas, U.S.	
23	Win	23–0	Wesley Martin	TKO	2 (6), 2:00	Nov 14, 2004	Mountain High Casino, Black Hawk, Colorado, U.S.	
22	Win	22–0	Willie Williams	UD	6	Jul 24, 2004	Boardwalk Hall, Atlantic City, New Jersey, U.S.	
21	Win	21–0	Terry Smith	UD	10	May 15, 2004	DePaul Athletic Center, Chicago, Illinois, U.S.	
20	Win	20–0	Derek Berry	RTD	6 (10), 3:00	Jan 22, 2004	Charlotte, North Carolina, U.S.	
19	Win	19–0	David Vedder	TKO	8 (8), 1:27	Dec 12, 2003	Casino Del Sol, Tucson, Arizona, U.S.	
18	Win	18–0	Ken Murphy	TKO	3	Nov 8, 2003	Cricket Arena, Charlotte, North Carolina, U.S.	
17	Win	17–0	Shane Swartz	RTD	6 (8), 3:00	Aug 29, 2003	Sovereign Center, Reading, Pennsylvania, U.S.	
16	Win	16–0	Marcus Rhode	KO	2 (8), 2:35	Jul 19, 2003	Reliant Center, Houston, Texas, U.S.	
15	Win	15–0	Jim Strohl	TKO	1 (6), 1:40	Jun 7, 2003	Boardwalk Hall, Atlantic City, New Jersey, U.S.	
14	Win	14–0	Shawn Robinson	TKO	1 (6), 1:28	Apr 4, 2003	Fernwood Resort, Bushkill, Pennsylvania, U.S.	
13	Win	13–0	Jeff Pegues	TKO	3 (6)	Jan 23, 2003	Convention Center, Charlotte, North Carolina, U.S.	
12	Win	12–0	Franklin Edmondson	TKO	2 (8), 2:41	Nov 22, 2002	Bally's Park Place Hotel Casino, Atlantic City, New Jersey, U.S.	
11	Win	11–0	Leroy Humphries	TKO	2 (6), 0:12	Sep 13, 2002	Mandalay Bay Resort & Casino, Paradise, Nevada, U.S.	
10	Win	10–0	Antonio Colbert	UD	6	Jul 27, 2002	Beau Rivage Casino, Biloxi, Mississippi, U.S.	
9	Win	9–0	Don Normand	TKO	2 (6), 2:44	May 25, 2002	Lowes Speedway, Charlotte, North Carolina, U.S.	
8	Win	8–0	Craig Brinson	TKO	5 (6), 1:40	Oct 7, 2001	Grand Victoria Casino, Elgin, Illinois, U.S.	
7	Win	7–0	Lewis Gilbert	TKO	1 (6), 3:00	Sep 2, 2001	Silverstar Hotel & Casino, Choctaw, Mississippi, U.S.	
6	Win	6–0	Rocky Gannon	TKO	2 (6), 2:27	Aug 18, 2001	Cox Pavilion, Paradise, Nevada, U.S.	
5	Win	5–0	Shawn Woods	TKO	1 (6), 2:42	Jun 17, 2001	Sunset Station, San Antonio, Texas, U.S.	
4	Win	4–0	Antonio Colbert	UD	4	Apr 1, 2001	Hard Rock Hotel and Casino, Paradise, Nevada, U.S.	
3	Win	3–0	Jeff Ford	TKO	2 (4), 1:37	Mar 23, 2001	Texas Station Casino, North Las Vegas, U.S.	
2	Win	2–0	Benjamin Garcia	TKO	1 (4), 2:29	Mar 11, 2001	Feather Falls Casino, Oroville, California, U.S.	
1	Win	1–0	Zibielee Kimbrough	TKO	3 (4), 1:05	Feb 11, 2001	Grand Victoria Casino, Elgin, Illinois, U.S.	

Sporting positions
Amateur boxing titles
Previous: Dominick Guinn	U.S. super heavyweight champion 1999	Next: T. J. Wilson
Regional boxing titles
Vacant Title last held by Shannon Briggs	WBC FECARBOX heavyweight champion 24 Jun 2006 - Aug 2006; Vacated	Vacant Title next held by Oliver McCall
Awards
Previous: Allan Green; KO1 Jaidon Codrington	The Ring Knockout of the Year; KO6 Zuri Lawrence; 2006	Next: Nonito Donaire; KO5 Vic Darchinyan
