= Sultan Ibragimov vs. Evander Holyfield =

Boxing competition

- Date: 13 October 2007
- Venue: Khodynka Ice Palace, Moscow, Russia
- Title(s) on the line: WBO heavyweight title

Tale of the tape
Boxer	Sultan Ibragimov	Evander Holyfield
Nickname		The Real Deal
Hometown	Rostov-on-Don, Rostov Oblast, Russia	Atlanta, Georgia, United States
Pre-fight record	21–0–1 (17 KO)	42–8–2 (27 KO)
Age	32 years, 7 months	44 years, 11 months
Height	6 ft 2 in (188 cm)	6 ft 2 1/2 in (189 cm)
Weight	219 lb (99 kg)	211 1/2 lb (96 kg)
Style	Southpaw	Orthodox
Recognition	WBO; Heavyweight Champion; The Ring; No. 6 Ranked Heavyweight	WBO; No. 11 Ranked Heavyweight; 2-division undisputed world champion

Result
- Ibragimov defeated Holyfield via Unanimous Decision

Sultan Ibragimov vs. Evander Holyfield, was a professional boxing match contested on 13 October 2007 for the WBO heavyweight championship.

== Background ==
Shortly after Ibragimov's decision victory over Shannon Briggs to win the WBO belt in June 2007, Ibragimov signed the contract to face then-WBA world heavyweight champion Ruslan Chagaev in a unification showdown that would take place in Moscow on 13 October 2007. "I gotta be honest – I've never had easier negotiations in my career. Right after beating Briggs, Ibragimov told me that he wanted to face a world champion in his next fight, in the end we contacted members of Ruslan Chagaev's team and agreed on everything", said the president of Seminole Warriors Boxing promotion company Leon Margules during the first pre-fight press-conference, "Both Sultan and Ruslan are true fighters. They are not interested in easy fights and title defenses against mandatory challengers. They want to unify belts and once again return prestige to the heavyweight division. I'm confident that the winner of this fight will eventually become the undisputed heavyweight champion". It was going to be the first heavyweight unification fight since 1999 and the third boxing event considered major for Moscow since WBC world heavyweight champion Oleg Maskaev defended his title against Okello Peter and heavyweight contender Alexander Povetkin faced fringe contender Larry Donald.

On 31 July 2007, it was officially announced that the unification showdown was cancelled due to Chagaev suffering from an aggravation of gastric problems. It was later reported that Chagaev had been diagnosed with hepatitis B. Instead, former undisputed heavyweight champion Evander Holyfield agreed to step in as a last-minute replacement. In the build up, Ibragimov praised Holyfield for his legendary career: "I remember watching his legendary heavyweight fights of the 90s when I was young. Some of them were unforgettable, like those against Riddick Bowe. Of course [back then] I couldn't imagine that I would fight Holyfield one day." He also added: "In the training camp, we put a lot of emphasis on defense. Holyfield is a dirty fighter who uses his head and elbows a lot." For the fight, Holyfield weighed in at 211.5 pounds, his lightest since 1996.

== The fight ==
The fight began tentatively, with Ibragimov mostly staying at range and avoiding exchanges, keeping Holyfield at bay with fast combinations. By the third round, Ibragimov began to take control of the fight. Ibragimov visibly hurt Holyfield with body punches in the third. In the fifth round, Ibragimov's in-ring dominance became more visible after again hurting Holyfield with combinations to the head and body, and by the seventh the fight took on a one-sided manner as Holyfield appeared to be unable to keep up with his younger opponent. Holyfield had some success in the eighth, hurting Ibragimov with a counter body shot and a straight right hand. Ibragimov hurt Holyfield again with a flurry of shots in the tenth but didn't go for the finish. The championship rounds saw Holyfield unsuccessfully going for the knockout, as Ibragimov was able to effectively neutralize Holyfield's offense and hurt Holyfield with precise body shots. Ultimately, the fight went full twelve rounds, with Ibragimov being declared the winner by unanimous decision, successfully defending his WBO world heavyweight title. The judges scored the bout 117–111 (twice) and 118–110.

== Aftermath ==
Ibragimov would agree to face IBF champion Wladimir Klitschko in the first heavyweight unification bout since 1999, losing his title in a unanimous decision before retiring. Holyfield would spend more than a year out of ring before facing WBA champion Nikolai Valuev where he would be on the end of a controversial majority decision ending his hopes of beating George Foreman's record as the oldest heavyweight champion in history.

== Undercard ==
Confirmed bouts:

Winner	Loser	Division	Notes / Titles at Stake
Dimitri Kirilov	José Navarro	Super-flyweight	Contested for the vacant IBF Super Flyweight world title. Kirilov scored a knockdown in the 3rd round.
Mohamed Azzaoui	Henry Saenz	Cruiserweight	Azzaoui won by RTD in round 8.
Vadim Tokarev	Marlon Hayes	Cruiserweight	A non-title bout on the scorecard.
Dawid Kostecki	Bernard Donfack	Light-heavyweight	Their fight originally ended in a majority draw, but the result was later changed by the Professional Boxing Federation of Russia.
Ali Ismayilov	Talgat Dosanov	Heavyweight	Part of the undercard heavyweight fights.
Khabib Allakhverdiev	Gustavo Miller	Heavyweight	A preliminary non-title bout.

== Broadcasting ==
Country	Broadcaster
New Zealand	Māori Television

Preceded by vs. Shannon Briggs	Sultan Ibragimov's bouts 13 October 2007	Succeeded by vs. Wladimir Klitschko
Preceded by vs. Lou Savarese	Evander Holyfield's bouts 13 October 2007	Succeeded by vs. Nikolai Valuev
