= Sultan Ibragimov =

Russian boxer (born 1975)

Sultan Ibragimov Султан Ибрагимов
Personal information
- Nationality: Russian
- Born: Sultan-Ahmed; Magomedsalihovich; Ibragimov; 8 March 1975 (age 51) Tlyarata, Dagestan ASSR, Russian SFSR, Soviet Union
- Height: 1.88 m (6 ft 2 in)
- Weight: Heavyweight

Boxing career
- Reach: 193 cm (76 in)
- Stance: Southpaw

Boxing record
- Total fights: 24
- Wins: 22
- Win by KO: 17
- Losses: 1
- Draws: 1
Medal record
Men's amateur boxing
Representing Russia
Olympic Games
Silver medal – second place	2000 Sydney	Heavyweight
European Championships
Silver medal – second place	2000 Tampere	Heavyweight
World Championships
Bronze medal – third place	2001 Belfast	Heavyweight

Sultan-Ahmed Magomedsalihovich Ibragimov (Russian: Султан-Ахмед Магомедсалихович Ибрагимов, Avar: Султан-АхӀмад МухӀаммадсалихӀазул вас Ибрагьимов; born 8 March 1975) is a Russian former professional boxer who competed from 2002 to 2008. He held the World Boxing Organization (WBO) heavyweight title from 2007 to 2008. He was ranked by The Ring as the world's sixth best active heavyweight at the conclusion of 2007 and 2008. As an amateur, he won silver medals at the 2000 Olympics and 2000 European Championships, and bronze at the 2001 World Championships, all in the heavyweight division.

Ibragimov is one of seven southpaws to become world heavyweight champion: the others being Michael Moorer, Corrie Sanders, Chris Byrd, Ruslan Chagaev, Charles Martin, and Oleksandr Usyk. He remains one of only five former world heavyweight champions, alongside Gene Tunney, Rocky Marciano, Riddick Bowe and Nikolai Valuev to have never suffered a stoppage defeat. He also holds the second least career losses among former world heavyweight champions (a distinction he holds with Tunney and surpassed only by the undefeated Marciano), having only lost to Wladimir Klitschko in his final fight. As of November 2020, BoxRec ranks Ibragimov as the 12th greatest Russian fighter of all time, pound-for-pound.

== Amateur career ==
Ibragimov took up boxing at the age of 17, when he came to Rostov-on-Don and joined a local college, training under a tutelage of Anatoly Chernyayev. Soon after he was spotted by the AIBA Vice President and Russia's top boxing official Ramazan Abacharayev, his compatriot from Dagestan, who became his trainer and mentor for a long time.

Ibragimov had over 130 fights as an amateur, competing in heavyweight, claiming 135 victories, and having at least 6 known losses (no stoppages.)

=== Highlights ===
(silver) Feliks Stamm Memorial (91 kg), Warsaw, Poland, September 1998:

- 1/4: Defeated Adam Roguszka (Poland) RSC 1
- 1/2: Defeated Vladimir Ganstatiuc (Moldova) on points, 7–2 (4 rds)
- Finals: Lost to Wojciech Bartnik (Poland) on points, 5–6 (4 rds)

USA–Russia Duals (91 kg), Marquette, Michigan, November 1998:

- Lost to Malik Scott (United States) on points, 6–11

USA–Russia Duals (91 kg), Mashantucket, Connecticut, November 1998:

- Defeated DaVarryl Williamson (United States) on points, 21–16

Trofeo Italia (91 kg), Naples, Italy, March 1999:

- 1/4: Lost to Giacobbe Fragomeni (Italy) on points, 4–8 (4 rds)

USA–Russia Duals (91 kg), Mashantucket, Connecticut, April 1999:

- Defeated DaVarryl Williamson (United States) RSC 3

(gold) Russian National Championships (91 kg), Chelyabinsk, Russia, June 1999

- 1/8: Defeated Vasiliy Kalinichenko by unanimous decision, 5–0
- 1/4: Defeated Yevgeniy Arkhipov by unanimous decision, 5–0
- 1/2: Defeated Sergey Lopatinskiy by unanimous decision, 5–0
- Finals: Defeated Igor Kshinin by unanimous decision, 5–0

(gold) Black Sea Cup (91 kg), Sevastopol, Ukraine, October 1999:

- 1/4: Defeated Oleksandr Yatsenko (Ukraine) by split decision, 3–2
- 1/2: Defeated Stephen Reynolds (Ireland) RSC 1
- Finals: Defeated Vladimir Chanturia (Georgia) by walkover

(silver) Summer Olympics (91 kg), Sydney, Australia, September 2000:

- 1/8: Defeated Pauga Laulau (Samoa) RSCO 4
- 1/4: Defeated Jackson Chanet (France) on points, 18–13 (4 rds)
- 1/2: Defeated Vladimir Chanturia (Georgia) on points, 19–14 (4 rds)
- Finals: Lost to Félix Savón (Cuba) on points, 13–21 (4 rds) (Savón suffered a deep cut under his left eye)

(silver) European Championships (91 kg), Tampere, Finland, May 2000:

- 1/8: Defeated Primislav Dimovski (Macedonia) on points, 8–3 (4 rds)
- 1/4: Defeated Oleksandr Yatsenko (Ukraine) RET 3
- 1/2: Defeated Andreas Gustavsson (Sweden) on points, 10–3 (4 rds)
- Finals: Lost to Jackson Chanet (France) DQ 4

(gold) Four Nations International Tournament (91 kg), Moscow, Russia, July 2000:

- 1/2: Defeated Oleksandr Yatsenko (Ukraine)
- Finals: Defeated Timur Ibragimov (Uzbekistan) on points, 12–5

(gold) Strandzha Cup (91 kg), Plovdiv, Bulgaria, February 2001:

- 1/4: Defeated Nasser al-Shami (Syria) on points, 12–1
- 1/2: Defeated Roberto Cammarelle (Italy) RSCI 2
- Finals: Defeated Felix Blazquez Barbero (Spain) by walkover

(bronze) World Championships (91 kg), Belfast, Northern Ireland, June 2001:

- 1/16: Defeated Stephen Reynolds (Ireland) on points, RSCH 2
- 1/8: Defeated Edson Claas (Brazil) KO 2
- 1/4: Defeated Kubrat Pulev (Bulgaria) on points, 15–12 (4 rds)
- 1/2: Lost to Odlanier Solís (Cuba) on points, 13–23 (4 rds)

== Professional career ==
=== Early fights ===
After turning professional, Ibragimov agreed to be managed by Boris Grinberg. He was also supported by the Russian billionaire Suleyman Kerimov. Ibragimov made his professional boxing debut on 25 May 2002, defeating Tracy Williams by first-round knockout. He won his first four fights by KO/TKO in the first round each. Just two weeks after his fourth bout, Ibragimov defeated Lincoln Luke by second-round TKO in what would be his last fight in 2002. In his sixth bout, Ibragimov, with a perfect record of 5 bouts, 5 wins, 5 KOs, faced Chad Butler, who had a 4–0–0 record with 4 KOs coming into the fight. Ibragimov knocked Butler down three times but could not finish him, ultimately winning the fight by unanimous decision (UD) with scores 59–52 (twice) and 58–53. Ibragimov later described the fight as the toughest and the most interesting of his career: "[Coming into the fight] I had five bouts and [scored] five knockouts, he had four fights and [scored] four knockouts. He was being knocked down but kept moving forward. If he hadn't ended up in prison, he would've accomplished a lot because of his assertivity." During the fight, legendary boxing trainer Angelo Dundee was spotted in Ibragimov's corner. In the post-fight interview, Dundee confirmed his return to professional boxing and that it was Ibragimov who convinced him to come out of retirement. He praised Ibragimov for his talent and boxing IQ, and predicted Ibragimov to become a future world heavyweight champion.

Ibragimov had his next fight less than a month later against Brazilian journeyman Carlos Barcelete. It was Ibragimov's first professional fight that took place in his native Russia. Ibragimov made a quick work of Barcelete, sending him to the canvas in the 2nd and knocking him out in the following round with a left hook. Barcelete was reportedly unconscious for an extended period of time, and had to be woken up by the ringside doctors. After the fight, Dundee once again praised Ibragimov for his performance: "America might finally see a great white heavyweight champion for the first time in 50 years." Ibragimov stayed in Russia for his next fight against Marcus McGee. It was Ibragimov's first 8-round fight of his professional career. Ibragimov defeated McGee by eighth-round TKO. After scoring two more first-round stoppages, Ibragimov then faced his former teammate Alexey Osokin, defeating him by a wide unanimous decision.

Ibragimov then returned to the United States, defeating Onebo Maxime by fifth-round TKO. Less than two months later, Ibragimov faced Najee Shaheed in a 12-round bout for the WBO Asia Pacific heavyweight title as part of the double-header which also featured Timur Ibragimov (who was referred to as Sultan's cousin, despite the fact that Sultan and Timur are not related) against Shawn Robinson. Sultan knocked out Shaheed in the third round. WBO president Luis Perez, who attended the fight, praised Sultan for his performance and said that Ibragimov would be eligible to become the mandatory challenger for the WBO world heavyweight championship after two or three successful defenses of the regional title. By November 2004, Ibragimov was ranked WBO's No. 14 heavyweight contender.

In his fifth and final fight of 2004, Ibragimov faced James Walton in his first defense of the Asia Pacific title. In the second round, Ibragimov sent Walton through the ropes with a series of body shots, however the referee concluded that the punches were below the belt and deducted two points from Ibragimov. Walton did not come out of his corner for the seventh round, prompting the referee to stop the fight and declare Ibragimov the winner by sixth-round TKO. At the conclusion of 2004, Ibragimov had a perfect record of 14–0 with 12 KOs and was ranked No. 11 heavyweight contender by WBO.

=== Ibragimov vs. Cole, Lawrence, Ahunanya ===
Ibragimov then took a big step up in competition when he agreed to face former IBF world cruiserweight champion Al Cole on 3 March 2005. The fight took place at the Madison Square Garden Theater and headlined the card that also featured Timur Ibragimov, former world super-featherweight champion Kevin Kelley and heavyweight contender Shannon Briggs. Cole was 3–3–1 in his last seven fights which included unanimous decision (UD) wins over undefeated prospect Vinny Maddalone and hard-hitting David Izon and a draw against former world heavyweight title challenger Jeremy Williams, with all his losses coming by way of decision. Cole was coming off of a close UD loss to Hasim Rahman, and had only been stopped by Corrie Sanders and long-time cruiserweight champion Juan Carlos Gomez up to that date. Standing at a height of 193 cm (6 ft 4 in) and having a 203 cm (80 in) reach, Cole had a 5 cm (2 in) height and 10 cm (4 in) reach advantage over Ibragimov, while also weighing in at 233.75 lbs, 17.75 pounds heavier than Sultan. During pre-fight press-conference, boxing promoter Sal Musumeci compared Sultan Ibragimov to Rocky Marciano, noting that they have a similar fighting style and training process. He then claimed that both Sultan and Timur would fight for championship belts by the end of the year. The fight only lasted three rounds. In the third round, Ibragimov dropped Cole with a left hook-uppercut combination. Cole got up, but Ibragimov immediately followed up with a barrage of unanswered shots, prompting the referee to stop the fight.

Ibragimov had his next fight scheduled just one and a half month later against one of the more recognized American journeymen Zuri Lawrence. It was the fourth card in a row co-headlined by the Ibragimov boxers. Coming into the fight, Lawrence was 3–2–1 in his last six fights, which included an upset unanimous decision (UD) victory over undefeated Italian prospect Paolo Vidoz and a draw against Ray Austin. Lawrence had also never been knocked out in his career, with his previous stoppage losses being declared technical knockouts. Ibragimov dominated Lawrence throughout the entire fight. He knocked him down once in the fourth and twice more in the ninth. After the ninth round, Lawrence had a deep cut above his left eye and a broken nose. After Ibragimov knocked Lawrence down for the fourth time in the eleventh, the referee stopped the contest, preventing battered Lawrence from absorbing more punishment. Ibragimov defended his WBO Asia Pacific title for the fourth time on 24 June 2005, defeating Andy Sample by first-round TKO in the main event of the card co-headlined by the Ibragimov boxers for the fifth time in a row. By July 2005, Sultan Ibragimov was ranked No. 8 heavyweight contender by the WBO.

On 16 September 2005 Ibragimov faced his former sparring partner and once-highly regarded prospect Friday Ahunanya at the Infinite Energy Arena in Duluth, Georgia. Friday was coming off of a draw against another prospect Dominick Guinn, and was only stopped by Lance Whitaker. In the build-up to the fight, Ahunanya stated that he was going to beat both Sultan and Timur, to which Sultan reacted by promising to "make him a hurricane" in the ring: "I know his weaknesses. I'll slowly break him down with left hooks and then finish him with the right hand to the head or body. Four months ago Friday was my sparring partner, back then I finished the sparring with a liver shot. In boxing, that's a knockout." The fight was described by some observers as "more competitive than expected", with Ibragimov going for an early knockout but seemingly struggling with the movement of Ahunanya who had his right elbow covering the liver throughout the entire fight. In the third round, Ibragimov stumbled and, after a push from Ahunanya, touched the canvas with a glove. The referee called it a knockdown. In attempt to narrow the round's score from 8–10 to 9-10, Ibragimov staggered Friday with a series of shots to the head and body, almost finishing Ahunanya who was saved by the bell. Ibragimov changed the strategy in the later rounds, working mostly Ahunanya's body. In the ninth round, Ibragimov staggered Friday with a left hook, as a result Ahunanya lost his balance and both fighters accidentally clashed their heads as Ibragimov was coming forward. The headbutt opened a cut under Ahunanya's left eye, prompting the referee to prematurely stop the fight and go to the judges' scorecards. The judges scored the bout 88–84, 88–83 and 87–83, all in favor of Ibragimov, declaring him the winner by technical decision.

In the post-fight interview, Ibragimov was critical of his own performance: "I knew about Friday's signature right hand and that it helped him score most of his knockouts, but for whatever reason I was constantly going under his right hand in the early rounds. I hoped to catch him off guard where he would expect it the least. It didn't really work because he mostly threw short, quick punches. I accepted my corner's advice to change the strategy, and everything immediately went much easier. If the fight had not been stopped, I would've finished him because I saw that after the seventh round he was less and less competitive." According to CompuBox stats, Ibragimov landed 123 punches (30.4% accuracy) to Ahunanya's 66 (28.1%). Ibragimov soundly outlanded Ahunanya in every round but seventh (both landed 11 punches), and he also connected on more power punches in each round. By November 2005, Ibragimov was ranked No. 5 contender by the WBO and No. 11 contender by the WBA.

=== Ibragimov vs. Whitaker ===
Ibragimov had his next fight scheduled two months later against 6 ft 8 in Lance Whitaker (31–3–1, 26 KOs) at the Hard Rock Live in Hollywood, Florida. Some observers viewed the fight as a big step up in competition for Ibragimov, describing Whitaker as the first true heavyweight contender Ibragimov had faced in his career up to that date. Coming into the fight, Whitaker was ranked No. 8 heavyweight contender by the WBO and No. 10 by the IBF. The build-up to the fight was surrounded with a lot of tension. A face-off at the pre-fight press-conference ended in a brawl when Whitaker pressed his first against Ibragimov's face and Ibragimov returned the favor, which prompted Whitaker to push Ibragimov away. Members of each boxer's team immediately came in to help their fighter. Both fighters were separated a couple of times, only to resume brawling. Ibragimov's manager Sampson Lewkowicz appeared to have got the worst of it, as he was accidentally punched by both fighters at the same time and had to be taken to the hospital. There were rumours that Whitaker injured his hand during the brawl which would put the fight in jeopardy, however Whitaker denied these rumours. For the fight, Ibragimov weighed in at 220.5 pounds (100.0 kg) and was outweighed by Whitaker by 50 pounds (23 kg). The fight was aired on ESPN2 and headlined the card that also featured another heavyweight contender Samuel Peter taking on Robert Hawkins.

The fight started with Ibragimov aggressively coming at Whitaker, throwing combinations to the head and body. Ibragimov knocked Whitaker down in the first round with a counter left hook, and then sent him to the canvas again in the second, this time with a flurry of shots. Whitaker seemed unable to withstand Ibragimov's hand speed and punching power. Ibragimov continued fighting aggressively, hurting Whitaker several times in the opening rounds. In round four and five, Ibragimov appeared to have taken his foot off the gas, fighting mostly in a counterpunching manner. He picked up his pace in the sixth round, sending Whitaker to the canvas for the third time with another flurry of shots. In the seventh round, referee called for a time out so that the ringside doctor could check the cut above Whitaker's right eye. The judge allowed him to resume fighting, however Whitaker did not wish to continue, prompting the referee to stop the fight, declaring Ibragimov the winner by seventh-round technical knockout.

"I promised my friends that I would finish the fight in the fourth or fifth round. That is why I started the fight so aggressively. I trained really hard for this fight. My friend Mike Tyson told me that if I am a real man, I simply have no right to lose", said Ibragimov in a post-fight interview. After the fight, Mike Tyson came out to the ring and praised Ibragimov for his performance, stating that he considers the Russian boxer to be one of the best heavyweights in the world. Ibragimov's dominant performance was widely praised. At the conclusion of 2005, Ibragimov had a record of 19–0 with 16 KOs and was ranked No. 5 heavyweight contender by the WBO, No. 9 contender by the WBA and No. 12 contender by the IBF.

=== Ibragimov vs. Austin ===
In early 2006, Sultan Ibragimov's team began negotiations with former WBA world heavyweight champion John Ruiz for a potential IBF world heavyweight title eliminator fight, however the fight did not materialize after Ruiz opted to face Nikolai Valuev in a rematch for the WBA world title. Ibragimow was also unable to reach agreements with Monte Barrett and Samuel Peter. Ultimately, IBF ordered its No. 2 ranked heavyweight contender Ray Austin to face Ibragimov in a 12-round IBF heavyweight title eliminator. Austin, who had fought at a professional level for eight years, was 36 years old coming into the bout, with ESPN commentators believing this was Austin's last chance to earn a shot at the heavyweight title. Coming into the fight, Austin was on a 12-fight unbeaten streak which included draws against Lance Whitaker, Zuri Lawrence and Larry Donald and an upset TKO win over then-highly regarded prospest Jo-el Scott. Ibragimov weighed in at 231.75 pounds (105.12 kg), his all time heaviest and 11.25 lbs heavier than in his previous bout, while Austin weighed in at 245.5 pounds (111.4 kg) which was 9.5 lbs lighter than in his last fight. Shortly before the fight, IBF had switched all three ringside judges. The fight was aired live on ESPN2 as part of the Friday Night Fights series.

The fight started with Ibragimov aggressively coming forward, while Austin tried to work behind the jab. In the first round, Ibragimov staggered Austin with a counter left hand, forcing Austin to clinch. Rounds two and three were met with a relative lack of action. In the fourth round, with thirty seconds left, Ibragimov went for the attack and missed with a left hand but immediately followed up with a swinging right hook, catching Austin off guard and knocking him down. Rounds five and six were relatively tentative, with Ibragimov occasionally hurting Austin with fast combinations, while Austin continued to work behind the jab. The judges gave those rounds to Austin. In the seventh round, Austin grabbed Ibragimov on the neck and made him lose balance which resulted in Ibragimov falling to the canvas. Despite the demands from Austin's corner, the referee did not rule it a knockdown. Ibragimov was more active in round nine but was sent to the canvas in the tenth with a left hook, however Ibragimov unhurt. In the eleventh and twelfth, Ibragimov hurt Austin a few times with a left hook but was unable to finish him, although he won those rounds on the judges' scorecards. Though Ibragimov appeared to have outboxed Austin for the majority of the fight, the judges ruled the bout a split draw, with the scorecards being 115–111 for Ibragimov, 114–112 for Austin and 113–113 even. According to CompuBox, Ibragimov landed 107 shots out of 347 (30.8%) while Austin landed 112 punches out of 463 thrown (24.2%). Ibragimov outlanded Austin in five rounds out of twelve, with two rounds being even in terms of landed shots (including the fourth round in which Ibragimov knocked Austin down). He also landed more power punches in rounds 1, 3, 4, 6, 9, 11 and 12, with 2nd round being even. Neither Ibragimov nor Austin were able to go past five landed jabs per round.

In an interview after the fight, Ibragimov expressed his disagreement with the decision: "I thought I won that fight, I don't understand how could one judge have Austin winning. Don King did his job: he changed the judges before the fight. I think you all understand who is Don King. And Ray Austin is his fighter." Ibragimov's manager Boris Grinberg expressed his disgust with the final decision: "We were robbed, plain and simple! That explains why the entire judging team had been switched before the fight. Moreover, one of those [new] judges is from Cleveland, Ray Austin's hometown. [...] If you look at the stats, the fighters exchanged knockdowns, but through the course of twelve rounds Ibragimov staggered Austin at least six or seven times, while Austin couldn't do it once." He also accused Don King of attempting to rob Sultan because Ibragimov didn't want to sign a contract with him. Both fighters were praised for their performance, with general belief that the bout elevated their stocks; the fight was named Friday Night Fights Fight of the Year by ESPN. The debate over IBF's mantadory challenger spot ended when Ibragimov agreed to face Shannon Briggs for the WBO world heavyweight title.

=== WBO world heavyweight champion ===
==== Ibragimov vs. Briggs ====
By October 2006, Ibragimov was ranked No. 1 heavyweight contender by the WBO. He was scheduled to challenge Shannon Briggs for the WBO world heavyweight title on 10 March 2007 at Madison Square Garden in New York, however the fight was postponed after Briggs fell ill with pneumonia. Ibragimov claimed that one of his American trainers had warned him two months before the scheduled date that Briggs was going to pull out as he didn't want to fight against a southpaw. After news of Briggs' withdrawal broke into public, DaVarryl Williamson expressed interest in taking the fight on short notice for the interim world title; however, because Williamson was unranked by the organization, the fight never materialized. Ibragimov instead opted to face Javier Mora (21–3–1, 17 KOs) in a stay-busy fight. Mora was mostly known for his seventh-round TKO win over heavyweight contender Kirk Johnson which was later changed into a No Contest. Ibragimov knocked out Mora 46 seconds into the first round. This win broke the record for the quickest knockout in a main event bout in Madison Square Garden, which was previously held by Lee Savold who defeated Buddy Walker in 1948.

Prior to facing Briggs, Ibragimov changed his training camp, joining Jeff Mayweather. Under Mayweather, Ibragimov moved away from his aggressive volume-punching fighting style that he was accustomed to, instead trying to adapt a more defensively-oriented style known as Philly Shell. Ibragimov eventually agreed to face Shannon Briggs for the WBO world heavyweight title in Atlantic City, New Jersey on 2 June 2007. In the build up to the fight, there were rumours that Briggs was going to pull out of the fight again, which Ibragimov described as a tactic from Briggs' team to disrupt Ibragimov's training process: "I heard some rumours about Briggs pulling out of the fight again, but I was suspicious that the whole thing was rigged by Briggs' people to unsettle me, make me relax and disrupt my training process. These suspicions were basically confirmed when my former coach Panama Lewis, who was close with some people from Briggs' camp, told us that Briggs' people spread those rumours on purpose." Ibragimov was 52 pounds lighter than his opponent coming into the bout.

The entire bout remained a tentative affair. Briggs hurt Ibragimov and generally had more success in the opening round but was unable to keep up with Ibragimov starting from the second round, as Ibragimov used his mobility and handspeed to outmaneuver Briggs and stay out of potential harm. Some observers noted that Ibragimov fought more defensively this time than he used to, avoiding exchanges and staying on the outside and behind the jab. Nevertheless accumulated damage seemed to overwhelm Briggs in the sixth round, but Ibragimov's corner urged their fighter not to go for the finish and keep fighting in a defensive manner and scoring one round after another. Eventually Ibragimov won the fight by unanimous decision, with the judges scoring the bout 119–109, 115–113 and 117–111. Some observers considered the 117–111 and especially 115–113 score undeservedly generous towards Briggs. According to CompuBox, Ibragimov connected on 94 punches out of 245 (38.37%) while Briggs landed only 39 shots out of 228 (17.11%). Ibragimov sondly outstruck Briggs in every round but first (even) and landed at least thrice Briggs' power punches in each of the twelve rounds but seventh and eleventh (7 to 4 and 5 to 2, respectively, in favor of Ibragimov). Briggs failed to land anything in round nine.

==== Ibragimov vs. Holyfield ====
Shortly after winning the title, Sultan Ibragimov signed the contract to face then-WBA world heavyweight champion Ruslan Chagaev in a unification showdown that would take place in Moscow on 13 October 2007. When talking about negotiations, president of Seminole Warriors Boxing promotion company Leon Margules described them as "the easiest negotiations of his career", praising both Ibragimov and Chagaev for being straightforward during the negotiation process. He also predicted the winner of this fight to eventually become the undisputed heavyweight champion. It was going to be the first heavyweight unification fight since 1999 and the third boxing event considered major for Moscow since WBC world heavyweight champion Oleg Maskaev defended his title against Okello Peter and heavyweight contender Alexander Povetkin faced fringe contender Larry Donald.

On 31 July 2007, it was officially announced that the unification showdown was cancelled due to Chagaev suffering from an aggravation of gastric problems. It was later reported that Chagaev had been diagnosed with hepatitis B. Instead, former undisputed heavyweight champion Evander Holyfield agreed to step in as a last-minute replacement. In the build up, Ibragimov praised Holyfield for his legendary career but also criticized him for his tactics, such as headbutting and using elbows during fights. For the fight, Holyfield weighed in at 211.5 pounds, his lightest since 1996. The fight headlined the card that also featured another Russian boxer Dimitri Kirilov defending his IBF world super flyweight title against Jose Navarro.

The fight began tentatively, with Ibragimov mostly staying at range and avoiding exchanges, keeping Holyfield at bay with fast combinations. By the third round, Ibragimov began to take control of the fight. Ibragimov visibly hurt Holyfield with body punches in the third. In the fifth round, Ibragimov's in-ring dominance became more visible after again hurting Holyfield with combinations to the head and body, and by the seventh the fight took on a one-sided manner as Holyfield appeared to be unable to keep up with his younger opponent. Holyfield had some success in the eighth, hurting Ibragimov with a counter body shot and a straight right hand. Ibragimov hurt Holyfield again with a flurry of shots in the tenth but didn't go for the finish. The championship rounds saw Holyfield unsuccessfully going for the knockout, as Ibragimov was able to effectively neutralize Holyfield's offense and hurt Holyfield with precise body shots. Ultimately, the fight went full twelve rounds, with Ibragimov being declared the winner by unanimous decision, successfully defending his WBO world heavyweight title. The judges scored the bout 117–111 (twice) and 118–110.

"My strategy was to be careful. Holyfield did a good job moving away from punches, he used his head a lot, so in the course of the fight, I decided to change my approach", Ibragimov said in a post-fight interview, "This is a championship fight, and it doesn't really matter how the winner earned his victory". "At one point we thought we would get Evander out of there. Once Sultan was trying to knock him out and he put himself in harm's way. He was trying to get the knockout for the people of Russia. Instead of trying to knock him out we wanted to get in and get out, and win one round at a time. In my mind he won 11 out of 12 rounds and never gave Evander any chances. We did what we wanted. We got a chance to fight a marquee name. We didn't just beat him, we dominated him and we made a statement. Evander knows he lost that fight", Jeff Mayweather said about the fight. Ibragimov also expressed his doubt whether he wanted to resume his boxing career. The bout was watched by 7.5 million viewers in Russia, becoming the most popular non-football and non-ice hockey sporting event of 2007. At the conclusion of 2007, Ibragimov was ranked as the world's sixth best heavyweight by The Ring.

=== Unification bout against Wladimir Klitschko ===
By the end of October 2007, Ibragimov started negotiations with then-IBF world heavyweight champion Wladimir Klitschko about the unification showdown in the near future. This would be the first heavyweight unification fight since 13 November 1999 when WBC champion Lennox Lewis defeated Evander Holyfield who was WBA and IBF champion at the time. On 20 November, Klitschko and Ibragimov officially signed the contract for their unification clash to take place on 23 February 2008 at Madison Square Garden. Two days later in Moscow, a first pre-fight press-conference was held. Klitschko began his preparations for the fight on 18 December. His training camp was located between Santa Monica, Los Angeles and Palm Beach, Florida. Ibragimov began his preparations for the bout on 25 December. Among Ibragimov's sparring partners were Klitschko's former opponent Jameel McCline and Swedish heavyweight prospect Attila Levin.

In the pre-fight prediction, a vast majority of Ukrainian, Russian and American observers expected Ibragimov to lose by either stoppage or unanimous decision. Out of six journalists of the Ukrainian magazine Ring, five predicted Klitschko to stop Ibragimov, with only one expecting Klitschko to win by decision. Only two of 26 members of boxingscene.com expected Ibragimov to win by decision. Two of the 12 members of ringsidereport.com picked Ibragimov to win by stoppage, with one of them saying that Ibragimov was more resilient psychologically and could withstand Klitschko's power. In the build-up to the fight, Klitschko's trainer Emmanuel Steward said that Ibragimov was going to be Wladimir's toughest opponent to date, praising Ibragimov for his hand speed and mobility, while Klitschko complimented Ibragimov on his accomplishments: "Sultan Ibragimov is a boxer that hasn't lost in any of his 23 fights, with the sole draw being against Ray Austin. His amateur career can be described as fantastic, and the fact that he's the heavyweight champion of the world speaks volumes about his professional career as well. I think he's a strong and dangerous opponent that should not be underestimated. His last two fights against Shannon Briggs and Evander Holyfield proved that." Ibragimov's trainer Jeff Mayweather was confident that Ibragimov would be able to establish his rhythm and "press Klitschko to the corner". The pre-fight build-up was marked with controversy after Ibragimov's manager Boris Grinberg insulted Klitschko during one of the interviews: "Sultan Ibragimov knocks out this Ukraine gay, motherf***er!". Grinberg later apologized to Klitschko. The day before the bout, Ibragimov weighed in at 219 pounds (99 kg), his lightest since 2005, while Klitschko's weight was 238 pounds (108 kg), the lightest since 1999.

From the opening bell, both fighters fought tentatively, avoiding risks. Klitschko retreated onto the outside, fighting at a distance and remaining unattainable for Ibragimov who tried to establish his right jab but had his right hand constantly pushed down by Klitschko. By the end of the opening round, Klitschko became more active with his jab, while Ibragimov unsuccessfully tried to catch Wladimir with a series of right and left hooks. By the third round, Klitschko took control of the center of the ring, keeping Ibragimov at the end of his left jab and occasionally throwing straight rights as well. In the fifth round, Ibragimov was caught with a straight right hand, but was not hurt. Most of Ibragimov's attempts to narrow the distance ended with him being tied up by Klitschko. In the second half of the fight, the situation did not change, with Ibragimov being kept at the distance with straight shots, while only being able to occasionally catch Klitschko with single shots to the body. Ibragimov's corner was almost silent from the sixth round onwards, unable to give their man any meaningful advice. Klitschko's dominance became even more visible after he caught Ibragimov with a straight right in round nine, almost knocking him down. Ibragimov was caught again with a counter left hook at the end of the eleventh. The twelfth round saw Ibragimov unsuccessfully trying to catch Klitschko with overhand shots. Ultimately, the fight went the distance, with Ibragimov losing by unanimous decision. The judges scored the bout 119–110, 117–111 and 118–110.

Years later when talking about the fight, Ibragimov admitted that in the middle rounds he had realized that he was going to lose: "We were very well prepared for the fight, our game plan was built around counterpunching, and I was patiently waiting for Klitschko to throw a straight right hand. But credit to him and his trainer Emmanuel Steward, for the first seven rounds Klitschko did not throw a single right hand. Basically, Klitschko's team prepared Wladimir to keep the fight away from tight quarters. And when the opponent doesn't want to fight aggressively and has a big advantage in height and reach, his job is a lot easier. In the middle of the fight I realized that I had already lost."

=== Retirement ===
In February 2009 there were rumors about Ibragimov's retirement from boxing following his loss to Wladimir Klitschko, which were later confirmed in July 2009. In 2016, Ibragimov stated that his decision to retire was caused by chronic problems with his left hand, including multiple fractures.

== Personal life ==
Ibragimov is of Avar Dagestani descent, and is Muslim by faith.

== Professional boxing record ==
24 fights	22 wins	1 loss
By knockout	17	0
By decision	5	1
Draws	1	

No.	Result	Record	Opponent	Type	Round, time	Date	Location	Notes
24	Loss	22–1–1	Wladimir Klitschko	UD	12	23 Feb 2008	Madison Square Garden, New York City, New York, US	Lost WBO heavyweight title; For IBF and IBO heavyweight titles
23	Win	22–0–1	Evander Holyfield	UD	12	13 Oct 2007	Megasport Arena, Moscow, Russia	Retained WBO heavyweight title
22	Win	21–0–1	Shannon Briggs	UD	12	2 Jun 2007	Boardwalk Hall, Atlantic City, New Jersey, US	Won WBO heavyweight title
21	Win	20–0–1	Javier Mora	TKO	1 (10), 0:46	10 Mar 2007	Madison Square Garden, New York City, New York, US	
20	Draw	19–0–1	Ray Austin	SD	12	28 Jul 2006	Hard Rock Live, Hollywood, Florida, US	
19	Win	19–0	Lance Whitaker	TKO	7 (12), 2:01	15 Dec 2005	Hard Rock Live, Hollywood, Florida, US	Retained WBO Asia Pacific heavyweight title
18	Win	18–0	Friday Ahunanya	TD	9 (12)	16 Sep 2005	The Arena at Gwinnett Center, Duluth, Georgia, US	Retained WBO Asia Pacific heavyweight title; Unanimous TD after Ahunanya was cut from an accidental head clash
17	Win	17–0	Andy Sample	TKO	1 (12), 2:47	24 Jun 2005	The Orleans, Paradise, Nevada, US	Retained WBO Asia Pacific heavyweight title
16	Win	16–0	Zuri Lawrence	TKO	11 (12), 0:32	22 Apr 2005	Tropicana Casino & Resort, Atlantic City, New Jersey, US	Retained WBO Asia Pacific heavyweight title
15	Win	15–0	Al Cole	TKO	3 (12), 1:46	3 Mar 2005	The Theater at Madison Square Garden, New York City, New York, US	Retained WBO Asia Pacific heavyweight title
14	Win	14–0	James Walton	TKO	6 (12), 3:00	11 Dec 2004	Atlantic Oceana Hall, New York City, New York, US	Retained WBO Asia Pacific heavyweight title
13	Win	13–0	Najee Shaheed	KO	3 (12), 2:45	16 Oct 2004	Ovation Club, Boynton Beach, Florida, US	Won vacant WBO Asia Pacific heavyweight title
12	Win	12–0	Onebo Maxime	TKO	5 (8), 2:13	28 Aug 2004	Ovation Club, Boynton Beach, Florida, US	
11	Win	11–0	Alexey Osokin	UD	8	10 Mar 2004	Crystal Casino, Moscow, Russia	
10	Win	10–0	Piotr Sapun	KO	1 (8)	29 Jan 2004	Centr na Tulskoy, Moscow, Russia	
9	Win	9–0	Sedrak Agagulyan	TKO	1 (8)	12 Sep 2003	Sports Palace Yunost, Donetsk, Ukraine	
8	Win	8–0	Marcus McGee	TKO	8 (8)	6 Jun 2003	KSK "Express", Rostov-on-Don, Russia	
7	Win	7–0	Carlos Barcelete	KO	3 (6)	22 Apr 2003	Casino Kamilla, Moscow, Russia	
6	Win	6–0	Chad Butler	UD	6	26 Mar 2003	Convention Center, Miami, Florida, US	
5	Win	5–0	Lincoln Luke	RTD	2 (4), 3:00	20 Dec 2002	American Airlines Arena, Miami, Florida, US	
4	Win	4–0	Clarence Goins	TKO	1 (4), 1:36	6 Dec 2002	Palladium Athletic Village, Davie, Florida, US	
3	Win	3–0	Leroy Hollis	TKO	1 (4), 2:30	18 Oct 2002	Hard Rock Cafe, Orlando, Florida, US	
2	Win	2–0	John Phillips	TKO	1 (4), 1:26	7 Jun 2002	DeSoto Civic Center, Southaven, Mississippi, US	
1	Win	1–0	Tracy Williams	KO	1 (4), 1:19	25 May 2002	Tennis Center, Delray Beach, Florida, US	

== Viewership ==
=== United States ===
Date	Fight	Network	Viewership (avg.)	Source(s)
28 June 2006	Sultan Ibragimov vs. Ray Austin	ESPN2	925,000 (Note: Average number of households)	
	Total viewership	ESPN2	925,000	

=== Russia ===
Date	Fight	Network	Viewership (avg.)	Source(s)
13 October 2007	Sultan Ibragimov vs. Evander Holyfield	1 Kanal	7,500,000	
23 February 2008	Wladimir Klitschko vs. Sultan Ibragimov	1 Kanal	9,500,000	
	Total viewership	1 Kanal	17,000,000	

Sporting positions
Regional boxing titles
Vacant Title last held by Kali Meehan	WBO Asia Pacific heavyweight champion 16 October 2004 – July 2006; Vacated	Vacant Title next held by Ruslan Chagaev
World boxing titles
Preceded by Shannon Briggs	WBO heavyweight champion 2 June 2007 – 23 February 2008	Succeeded by Wladimir Klitschko
