= George Foreman vs. Shannon Briggs =

Boxing match

The Legend Continues...
- Date: November 22, 1997
- Venue: Trump Taj Mahal, Atlantic City, New Jersey, U.S.
- Title(s) on the line: Lineal Heavyweight Championship

Tale of the tape
Boxer	George Foreman	Shannon Briggs
Nickname	Big	The Cannon
Hometown	Houston, Texas, U.S.	Brooklyn, New York, U.S.
Purse	$5,000,000	$400,000
Pre-fight record	76–4 (68 KO)	29–1 (24 KO)
Age	48 years, 10 months	25 years, 11 months
Height	6 ft 4 in (193 cm)	6 ft 4 in (193 cm)
Weight	260 lb (118 kg)	227 lb (103 kg)
Style	Orthodox	Orthodox
Recognition	Lineal; Heavyweight Champion; WBC/The Ring; No. 8 Ranked Heavyweight	WBC; No. 20 Ranked Heavyweight

Result
- Briggs wins via 12-round majority decision (114-114, 116-112, 117-113)

George Foreman vs. Shannon Briggs, billed as The Legend Continues..... was a professional boxing match contested on November 22, 1997, for the lineal heavyweight championship.

== Background ==
After capturing the WBA and IBF titles from Michael Moorer late in 1994, George Foreman would forfeit his WBA title and make only one defense of his IBF portion, narrowly and controversially defeating little-known German fighter Axel Schulz on April 22, 1995. Though the IBF mandated a rematch between the two, Foreman decided against it and chose instead to forfeit the title.

As he had not been beaten for either title, Foreman remained the lineal champion and successfully defended that crown (as well as the lowly regarded WBU heavyweight title) against then-undefeated prospects Crawford Grimsley and Lou Savarese. Following his win over Savarese, Foreman was given the opportunity to face Lennox Lewis for Lewis' WBC heavyweight title, with Foreman first having to win an "eliminator" bout against a contender. The WBC supplied Foreman with a list of acceptable opponents, including future heavyweight champions Chris Byrd and Hasim Rahman and the recently returned former Undisputed Heavyweight Champion James "Buster" Douglas, though Foreman ultimately picked Shannon Briggs.

Coming into the fight, Briggs sported a 29–1 record with 24 wins coming by way of knockout. However, despite his impressive record, his one loss had been a third round knockout against Darroll "Doin' Damage" Wilson on HBO the previous year which halted his momentum and hurt his status as one of the premier up-and-coming heavyweights. However, realizing that a win over Foreman would get him back into contention, Briggs vowed to be ready for the fight stating that he was "confident that I can go in and fight for 12 rounds and win a decision."

== The fight ==
The fight was a controversial one as many felt Foreman had clearly won the fight, though it would be Briggs who would ultimately pick up the victory by way of majority decision. Through the course of the fight, Foreman landed more punches and had a higher percentage of his punches land than Briggs. Foreman landed 284 of his 488 punches for a 58% success rate while Briggs only landed 45% of his punches, going 223 for 494.

Foreman spent much of the fight as the aggressor while Briggs spent a lot of the fight retreating. In the later rounds Foreman's power punches seemed to take a toll on the younger Briggs, as he began slowing down and all but abandoned his tactic of moving away from Foreman and was hit from some heavy shots as a result. In the 12th and final round, Foreman tried hard for a knockout victory and was able to break Briggs' nose but was unable to score a knockdown. As a result, the result went to the judge's scorecards.

Unofficial HBO scorer Harold Lederman had Foreman clearly winning the fight at 116–112 (eight rounds to four), but none of the three official scorers had Foreman the victor. One judge scored the fight a draw at 114–114 while the other two had the fight scored 116–112 and 117–113 in favor of Briggs, giving him both the majority decision win and the Lineal heavyweight title.

== Aftermath ==
The fight proved to be the last of Foreman's career. However, shortly after his loss to Briggs, his promoters Jeff Wald and Irving Azoff, feeling that Foreman had clearly won, launched a protest in an effort to get the decision overturned which would allow Foreman to move on to face Lewis for his WBC heavyweight title; the decision, though, was upheld.

In 1998, Foreman agreed to come out of retirement once again to face another aging legend in Larry Holmes with a date set for January 23, 1999, but the bout was called off after the promoter could not pay the remaining $9 million of Foreman's promised $10 million purse. Foreman would finish his career with an overall record of 76–5. In his 10-year comeback from 1987 to 1997, Foreman went 31–3 with 26 knockouts. In addition, none of the 34 fighters he faced during that span were able to score a knockdown over him.

Briggs, on the other hand, secured a WBC championship fight with Lennox Lewis, which was set for March 28, 1998. Briggs fought Lewis aggressively and had the champion in trouble at the end of the first round, but Lewis dominated the remainder of the fight and scored three knockdowns over Briggs in the next four rounds, ultimately winning by fifth round technical knockout.

== Full card ==
Confirmed bouts:

Weight class		vs.		Type	Round	Time	Notes
Heavyweight	(United States) Shannon Briggs	def.	(United States) George Foreman (c)	MD	12/12		For Lineal heavyweight championship
Heavyweight	(New Zealand) David Tua	def.	(United States) Jeff Lally	TKO	2/10	1:04
Middleweight	(United States) David Reid	def.	(United States) Dan Connolly	TKO	5/8	1:04
Super Welterweight	(United States) Fernando Vargas	def.	(United States) Jose Miguel Fernandez	TKO	1/8	2:56
Heavyweight	(United States) Derrick Jefferson	def.	(United States) Isaac Brown	TKO	1/8
Heavyweight	(United States) Willie Williams	def.	(United States) Zuri Lawrence	PTS	6/6
Heavyweight	(United States) Mary Barnes	def.	(United States) Greta Daniels	TKO	2/?		Women's heavyweight bout

== Broadcasting ==
Country	Broadcaster
Canada	TSN
United Kingdom	Sky Sports
United States	HBO

Preceded by vs. Lou Savarese	George Foreman's bouts 22 November 1997	Retired
Preceded by vs. Jorge Valdes	Shannon Briggs's bouts 22 November 1997	Succeeded by vs. Lennox Lewis
