= John Bray (boxer) =

American boxer (born 1970)

John Fitzgerald Bray (born June 17, 1970, in Van Nuys, California) is a former American Heavyweight boxer.

== Amateur career ==
Bray had a solid amateur career prior to turning professional. He won the National AAU Heavyweight Championship in 1991. Bray won the United States Amateur 201-lb championship by defeating Bobby Harris via TKO in semi-finals and a 4–1 victory over Javier Alvarez in finals. In November 1991 he lost in the World Amateur Championships 14–6 to Bert Teuchert. In 1992 Bray competed in the Olympic Trials Western Regionals and won via KO over Wesley Martin and then beat Sammy Denson 3–2, but then lost to Marlon Simpkins 5–0. Bray had a successful amateur record of 124–12.

== Outside the Ring ==
Bray was also a part-time private investigator and carried a gun for his job. In August 1991, Bray accidentally shot himself in mouth with a 9mm hand gun.

== Training career ==
Bray currently serves as a boxing trainer, and trains fighter Cisse Salif and Taishan Dong

== Professional career ==
Bray turned professional in 1992 and experienced limited success as a pro. He fought few notable opponents, and retired in 1998 after a loss to Josh Gormley.

== Professional boxing record ==
15 Wins (5 knockouts, 10 decisions), 3 Losses (1 knockout, 2 decisions), 2 Draws
Result	Record	Opponent	Type	Round	Date	Location	Notes
Loss	15-2	(United States) Josh Gormley	TKO	1	24/04/1998	(United States) San Jose Arena, San Jose, California	
Draw	5-2-1	(United States) Cliff Couser	PTS	6	15/09/1995	(United States) Las Vegas, Nevada	
Win	15-2	(United States) Jesse Prieto	TKO	4	18/08/1995	(United States) Las Vegas, Nevada	
Win	3-4	(United States) Michael Green	MD	6	03/08/1995	(United States) Las Vegas, Nevada	
Draw	3-3-1	(United States) Craig Brinson	PTS	6	05/11/1994	(United States) Las Vegas, Nevada	
Win	11-6-1	(United States) Craig Payne	PTS	8	06/05/1994	(United States) Terre Haute, Indiana	
Win	2-23-2	(United States) John Basil Jackson	PTS	6	15/02/1994	(United States) Indianapolis, Indiana	
Loss	6-1	(United States) Will Hinton	UD	6	06/12/1993	(United States) Rosemont Horizon, Rosemont, Illinois	
Win	2-16-2	(United States) John Basil Jackson	PTS	6	13/11/1993	(United States) Greensburg, Indiana	
Win	--	Corner Miller	KO	1	21/10/1993	(United States) Hammond, Indiana	
Win	3-10-1	(United States) Brian Morgan	PTS	6	14/09/1993	(United States) Indianapolis, Indiana	
Win	3-40-1	(United States) Ahmad Gihad	PTS	6	27/08/1993	(United States) Union Hall, Countryside, Illinois	
Win	3-38-1	(United States) Ahmad Gihad	PTS	6	11/08/1993	(United States) South Bend, Indiana	
Win	12-39-6	(United States) Danny Blake	MD	6	26/04/1993	(United States) Rosemont, Illinois	
Win	0-7	(United States) Andre Smiley	PTS	6	13/04/1993	(United States) Hammond, Indiana	
Win	1-6	(United States) David Payne	PTS	4	02/02/1993	(United States) Indianapolis, Indiana	
Loss	2-0	(United States) Will Hinton	MD	4	30/01/1993	(United States) Las Vegas, Nevada	
Win	12-13-3	(United States) Joey Christjohn	TKO	1	14/10/1992	(United States) Rosemont Horizon, Rosemont, Illinois	Referee stopped the bout at 2:24 of the first round.
Win	0-5-1	(United States) Brian Morgan	KO	1	01/09/1992	(United States) Indianapolis, Indiana	
Win	--	(United States) John Warrior	KO	1	01/08/1992	(United States) Muscatine, Iowa	

Preceded by Javier Alvarez	United States Amateur Heavyweight Champion; 1991	Succeeded by Shannon Briggs
