= Shannon Briggs vs. Sultan Ibragimov =

Boxing match

- Date: 2 June 2007
- Venue: Boardwalk Hall, Atlantic City, New Jersey, U.S
- Title on the line: WBO Heavyweight Championship

Tale of the tape
Boxer	(United States) Shannon Briggs	(Russia) Sultan Ibragimov
Nickname	"The Cannon"	
Hometown	Brooklyn, New York, U.S.	Tlyarata, Dagestan, Russia
Purse	$1,875,000	$625,000
Pre-fight record	48–4–1 (42 KO)	21–0–1 (17 KO)
Age	35 years, 5 months	32 years, 2 months
Height	6 ft 4 in (193 cm)	6 ft 2 in (188 cm)
Weight	273 lb (124 kg)	221 lb (100 kg)
Style	Orthodox	Southpaw
Recognition	WBO; Heavyweight Champion; The Ring; No. 5 Ranked Heavyweight	WBO; No. 1 Ranked Heavyweight; 2000 Olympic Heavyweight Silver Medallist

Result
- Ibragimov defeated Briggs by 12th round Unanimous Decision

Shannon Briggs vs. Sultan Ibragimov was a professional boxing match contested on 2 June 2007, for the WBO Heavyweight championship.

== Background ==
After his final round stoppage of Siarhei Liakhovich to win the WBO belt, he signed to face top ranked contenter Sultan Ibragimov on 10 March at Madison Square Garden's theater. With Briggs saying at the news conference "My dream was always to win and defend the title there, now I'm going to be defending it and that's a dream come true for me. I've come a long way from being a homeless kid in Brooklyn to being world champion." Briggs would pull out of the March date after being diagnosed with "aspiration pneumonia." Ibragimov would stop replacement Javier Mora in the 1st round, after a fight with DaVarryl Williamson never materialized. The bout would rearranged for 2 June in Moscow, however it would later be switched to Atlantic City, New Jersey.

As part of his preparation, Ibragimov teamed up with Jeff Mayweather, who became his head coach. In the build up to the fight, there were rumours that Briggs was going to pull out of the fight again, which Ibragimov would describe as a tactic to disrupt Ibragimov's training process: "I heard some rumours about Briggs pulling out of the fight again, but I was suspicious that the whole thing was rigged by Briggs' people to unsettle me, make me relax and disrupt my training process. These suspicions were basically confirmed when my former coach Panama Lewis, who was close with some people from Briggs' camp, told us that Briggs' people spread those rumours on purpose."

== The fight ==
The bout was a tentative affair. Briggs would hurt Ibragimov and generally had the best of the opening round but was unable to keep up with Ibragimov from the second round onwards, as the challenger used his mobility and handspeed to fire quick combinations, outmaneuver Briggs and stay out of potential harm. Some observers noted that Ibragimov fought more defensively this time than he used to, avoiding exchanges and staying on the outside and behind the jab. Briggs, who came in at a career heaviest 273 Ibs, was only sporadic punching and failed to launch any follow up attacks. Nevertheless, accumulated damage seemed to overwhelm Briggs in the sixth round, but Ibragimov's corner urged their fighter not to go for the finish and keep fighting in a defensive manner and scoring one round after another. After 12 rounds, Ibragimov would win by unanimous decision, with the judges scoring the bout 119–109, 115–113 and 117–111. ESPN's Dan Rafael scored it 118–111 for Ibragimov.

According to CompuBox, Ibragimov connected on 94 punches out of 245 (38.4%) while Briggs landed only 39 shots out of 228 (17.1%) with Ibragimov outlanding Briggs in every round but first (even). Briggs, never landed more than 6 punches per round, failed to land anything in the 9th round.

== Aftermath ==
Briggs announced his retirement immediately following the bout, although he would returned just over two years later.

Shortly after the bout, Ibragimov signed a contract to face WBA champion Ruslan Chagaev in a unification fight set for 13 October in Moscow. However, in August Chagaev pulled out with an undisclosed stomach ailment, to be replaced with four time former champion Evander Holyfield.

== Undercard ==
Confirmed bouts:

== Broadcasting ==
Country	Broadcaster
Germany	RTL
Russia	REN TV
United States	Warriors PPV

Preceded by vs. Siarhei Liakhovich	Shannon Briggs's bouts 2 June 2007	Succeeded by vs. Marcus McGee
Preceded by vs. Javier Mora	Sultan Ibragimov's bouts 2 June 2007	Succeeded by vs. Evander Holyfield
