= Lennox Lewis vs. Shannon Briggs =

Boxing competition

March Badness
- Date: March 28, 1998
- Venue: Convention Center, Atlantic City, New Jersey, U.S.
- Title(s) on the line: WBC/Lineal Heavyweight Championships

Tale of the tape
Boxer	Lennox Lewis	Shannon Briggs
Nickname	The Lion	The Cannon
Hometown	London, England	Brooklyn, New York, US
Purse	$4,000,000	$1,000,000
Pre-fight record	32–1 (26 KO)	30–1 (24 KO)
Age	32 years, 6 months	26 years, 3 months
Height	6 ft 5 in (196 cm)	6 ft 4 in (193 cm)
Weight	243 lb (110 kg)	228 lb (103 kg)
Style	Orthodox	Orthodox
Recognition	WBC; Heavyweight Champion	Lineal; Heavyweight Champion

Result
- Lewis wins via 5th Round TKO

Lennox Lewis vs. Shannon Briggs, billed as March Badness, was a professional boxing match contested on March 28, 1998, for the WBC and Lineal Heavyweight Championships.

== Background ==
After Lennox Lewis successfully defended his WBC title in a dominating first-round knockout victory over Andrew Golota, the WBC organized an elimination match between Lineal champion George Foreman and Shannon Briggs to determine who would become Lewis' next opponent. The match was held on November 22, 1997, and went the full 12 rounds. Though many assumed that Foreman had won the match, (both Harold Lederman and the associated press had Foreman ahead by four points on their unofficial scorecards) the three judges saw the result differently. Two judges had Briggs the winner by scores of 117–113 and 116–112 while the third ruled the bout a draw with a score of 114–114, giving Briggs the victory by majority decision. The results of the outcome elicited anger, obscene chants, and booing from the crowd in attendance as well as widespread skepticism from writers and journalists covering the event.

Angered by the controversial decision, Foreman's promoters accused New Jersey Boxing Commission chairman Larry Hazzard of waging a "vendetta" against them and protested the result to the New Jersey State Athletic Control Board. The decision was ultimately upheld and Lewis was given the option of facing alternative challengers which included former unified champions Michael Moorer and James 'Buster' Douglas as well as an opportunity to face WBA/IBF champion Evander Holyfield but Lewis opted to face Briggs instead.

== The fight ==
Lewis was able to control most of the first round by effectively using his strong left jab to keep Briggs off balance while occasionally landing some power punches as well. However, with only 30 seconds left in the round, Briggs was able to land a short left hand that staggered Lewis. Briggs then began a furious 20-second rally that saw him land several power punches in an attempt to gain the knockout victory. Briggs concluded his assault with a right hook that sent Lewis stumbling into the corner with 15 seconds left, Briggs quickly attempted to continue his attack with Lewis in the corner, but Lewis was able to get a hold of Briggs and clinched him until the round ended. Lewis rebounded in round two and much like in the previous round, used his left jab to keep Briggs at bay. However, as the second minute of the round came to a close, Briggs landed a powerful left hook that staggered Lewis, but Lewis was able to withstand Briggs' follow-up combination and ended the round strongly by landing two combinations within the round's last 10 seconds.

Lewis began the fourth round aggressively and landed a combination that sent Briggs into the ropes. Briggs attempted to backpedal away, but Lewis landed a right hand that stunned Briggs. After continuing his assault on Briggs, Lewis was finally to gain a knockdown after a right hook dropped Briggs to the canvas 43 seconds into the round. Briggs was able to answer the referee's count, but Lewis was able to quickly get Briggs up against the ropes and proceeded to land several more punches before Briggs was finally able to punch his way out. After being dominated by Lewis for the entire round, Briggs was able to land some offense and hit Lewis with a strong left hand with 42 seconds left in the round. Lewis avoided Briggs' follow-up punches and countered with a left hook and a three-punch combination that again sent Briggs down to mat. Briggs was able to answer the referee's count at eight and survived the remainder of the round.

Lewis continued to punish Briggs with power punches in the fifth round and knocked Briggs down for the third time with a powerful right hook at 1:09 into the round. Briggs laid flat on his back for five second but got back up at the count of eight and continued with the fight. Lewis continued to pummel Briggs and after Briggs collapsed to the mat following a missed left hook, referee Frank Cappuccino stopped the fight and awarded Lewis the victory by technical knockout.

== Aftermath ==
Lewis had hoped for a bout with Evander Holyfield for the undisputed championship, however he needed to have a mandatory defence against Henry Akinwande, as a result Lewis agreed to face with his number one contender, the undefeated Croatian Željko Mavrović.

== Undercard ==
Confirmed bouts:

== Broadcasting ==
Country	Broadcaster
United Kingdom	Sky Sports
United States	HBO

Preceded by vs. Andrew Golota	Lennox Lewis's bouts 28 March 1998	Succeeded by vs. Željko Mavrović
Preceded by vs. George Foreman	Shannon Briggs's bouts 28 March 1998	Succeeded by vs. Marcus Rhode
