= Zuri Lawrence =

American boxer

Personal information
- Born: June 22, 1970 (age 56) Poughkeepsie, New York, USA
- Weight: Heavyweight

Boxing career
- Stance: Orthodox

Boxing record
- Total fights: 44
- Wins: 24
- Win by KO: 0
- Losses: 15
- Draws: 4
- No contests: 1

Zuri Lawrence (born June 22, 1970) is an American professional boxer who competed from 1994 to 2009. He is most well known for having never scored a knockout win in 44 professional fights.

== Career ==
Lawrence has never fought for a major heavyweight title, but he served an important test for up-and-coming prospects. Notable losses include a technical knockout loss in 11 (after being down 4 times) to Russian prospect Sultan Ibragimov and being brutally rendered unconscious by Calvin Brock, the latter of which was named The Ring magazine Knockout of the Year.

Notable wins include upsetting the comeback trail of Jameel McCline after McCline's second heavyweight title loss and being the first to defeat highly touted Italian Olympic medalist and prospect Paolo Vidoz.

Lawrence was rarely stopped and could give 12 rounds of technical boxing. This combined with his seeming inability to knock an opponent out made Lawrence a popular opponent amongst matchmakers looking to get their prospects noticed. Prior to their fight Calvin Brock gave an example of this thinking in an interview with Tiger Boxing: "Zuri Lawrence? Sure. He's good, but he doesn't have any power, so I wouldn't call it a high-risk fight."

In November 2007, Lawrence took on Hasim Rahman on short notice on Versus. In a close battle in which Versus' viewers had Lawrence leading, he was knocked out by Rahman in the 10th and final round. The scores at the time of stoppage were 86-84 for Lawrence and 86–84, 88-82 for Rahman. In a rare feat, Lawrence was knocked out of the ring and onto the arena floor, only to return to the ring prior to the 20 count and continue fighting.

In July 2008, Lawrence won in a huge upset over heavyweight prospect Albert Sosnowski after taking the fight on late notice.

He fought Jason Estrada on September 2, 2009, and which Lawrence was knocked down once in the second and once in the seventh before the referee stopped the fight at 2:33.

== Professional boxing record ==
24 Wins (0 knockouts, 24 decisions), 15 Losses (8 knockouts, 7 decisions), 4 Draws, 1 No Contest Archived August 29, 2012, at the Wayback Machine
Result	Record	Opponent	Type	Round	Date	Location	Notes
Loss	24-15-4 (1)	(United States) Jason Estrada	TKO	7	02/09/2009	(United States) Mohegan Sun Grandstand, Syracuse, New York, U.S.	Referee stopped the bout at 2:33 of the seventh round.
Win	24-14-4 (1)	(Poland) Albert Sosnowski	UD	8	06/08/2008	(United States) Aviator Sports Complex, New York City, New York, U.S.	
Loss	23-14-4 (1)	(United States) Darrel Madison	UD	8	30/05/2008	(United States) Monticello Raceway & Casino, Monticello, New York, U.S.	For vacant New York heavyweight title.
Loss	23-13-4 (1)	(United States) Hasim Rahman	TKO	10	15/11/2007	(United States) Sovereign Center, Reading, Pennsylvania, U.S.	For WBC–NABF heavyweight title. Referee stopped the bout at 2:20 of the tenth round.
Win	23-12-4 (1)	(United States) Jermaine Woods	UD	8	26/10/2007	(United States) Monticello Raceway & Casino, Monticello, New York, U.S.	Lawrence was knocked down in the first round.
Win	22-12-4 (1)	(United States) Jason Bergman	UD	4	03/08/2007	(United States) Monticello Raceway & Casino, Monticello, New York, U.S.	
Win	21-12-4 (1)	(United States) Harvey Jolly	UD	6	29/06/2007	(United States) Connecticut Expo Center, Hartford, Connecticut, U.S.	
Loss	20-12-4 (1)	(United States) Dominick Guinn	TKO	2	02/02/2007	(United States) Main Street Armory, Rochester, New York, U.S.	Referee stopped the fight at 2:59 of the second round after Lawrence was knocked down twice in the round.
Loss	20-11-4 (1)	(United States) Calvin Brock	KO	6	25 Feb 2006	(United States) Mandalay Bay Resort & Casino, Paradise, Nevada, U.S.	Lawrence knocked out at 2:58 of the sixth round.
Win	20-10-4 (1)	(United States) Jameel McCline	UD	10	21/10/2005	(United States) Seminole Hard Rock Hotel & Casino, Hollywood, Florida, U.S.	
Loss	19-10-4 (1)	(Russia) Sultan Ibragimov	TKO	11	22/04/2005	(United States) Tropicana Hotel & Casino, Atlantic City, New Jersey, U.S.	For WBO Asia Pacific heavyweight title. Referee stopped the fight at 0:32 of the 11th round.
Win	19-9-4 (1)	(United States) Demetrice King	UD	6	24/08/2004	(United States) Mid-Hudson Civic Center, Poughkeepsie, New York, U.S.	
Loss	18-9-4 (1)	(Germany) Timo Hoffmann	UD	12	22/11/2003	Erdgas Arena, Riesa, Germany	For vacant WBO Inter-Continental heavyweight title.
Draw	18-8-4 (1)	(United States) Ray Austin	MD	10	15/02/2003	(United States) Flamingo Hilton, Laughlin, Nevada, U.S.	
Loss	18-8-3 (1)	(United States) Tony Thompson	TKO	7	20/10/2002	(United States) Emerald Queen Casino, Tacoma, Washington, U.S.	Referee stopped the bout at 1:06 of the seventh round.
Win	18-7-3 (1)	(Italy) Paolo Vidoz	UD	8	17/08/2002	(United States) Taj Majal Hotel & Casino, Atlantic City, New Jersey, U.S.	
Win	17-7-3 (1)	(United States) David Vedder	UD	6	25/05/2002	(United States) Hilton Hotel, Las Vegas, Nevada, U.S.	
Win	16-7-3 (1)	(United States) Louis Monaco	UD	6	04/05/2001	(United States) Mohegan Sun Casino, Uncasville, Connecticut, U.S.	
Win	15-7-3 (1)	(Nigeria) King Ipitan	DQ	9	24/08/2000	(United States) Coeur d'Alene Casino, Worley, Idaho, U.S.	Ipitan was disqualified for repeated low blows.
Win	14-7-3 (1)	(United States) Anthony Moore	PTS	8	29/04/2000	St John's, Antigua and Barbuda	
Win	13-7-3 (1)	(Mexico) Mike Sedillo	UD	10	06/04/2000	(United States) Coeur d'Alene Casino, Worley, Idaho, U.S.	
Loss	12-7-3 (1)	(United States) David Bostice	UD	10	02/03/2000	(United States) Ramada Inn, Rosemont, Illinois, U.S.	
Loss	12-6-3 (1)	(United States) Brian Nix	UD	8	07/10/1999	(United States) Soaring Eagle Casino, Mount Pleasant, Michigan, U.S.	
Win	12-5-3 (1)	(United States) Darroll Wilson	UD	10	02/09/1999	(United States) City Center, Saratoga Springs, New York, U.S.	
Win	11-5-3 (1)	(United States) Brian Watson	DQ	6	09/07/1999	(United States) Cape Cod Melody Tent, Hyannis, Massachusetts, U.S.	Watson was disqualified after tackling Lawrence out of the ring.
Win	10-5-3 (1)	(United States) Domingo Monroe	PTS	4	15/05/1999	(United States) Leominster, Massachusetts, U.S.	
Win	9-5-3 (1)	(United States) Juan Quintana	PTS	4	27/02/1999	(United States) Leominster, Massachusetts, U.S.	
Win	8-5-3 (1)	(United Kingdom) Derek Williams	PTS	6	02/10/1998	Hala Ludowa, Wrocław, Poland	
Loss	7-5-3 (1)	(Uzbekistan) Furkat Tursunov	PTS	8	25/09/1998	Poznań, Poland	
Loss	7-4-3 (1)	(United States) Willie Williams	PTS	6	22/11/1997	(United States) Taj Majal Hotel & Casino, Atlantic City, New Jersey, U.S.	
Loss	7-3-3 (1)	(United States) Greg Pickrom	TKO	5	11/09/1997	(United States) Foxwoods Resort Casino, Ledyard, Connecticut, U.S.	
Win	7-2-3 (1)	(United States) Craig Tomlinson	UD	6	12/06/1997	(United States) Martin's West, Woodlawn, Maryland, U.S.	
Win	6-2-3 (1)	(Nigeria) Josh Imardiyi	PTS	6	30/03/1997	(United States) Mohegan Sun Casino, Uncasville, Connecticut, U.S.	
Win	5-2-3 (1)	(United States) Exum Speight	PTS	6	07/07/1996	(United States) ABC Sports Complex, Springfield, Virginia, U.S.	
Win	4-2-3 (1)	(United States) Rashid Latif	UD	4	28/06/1996	(United States) Ukrainian Cultural Center, Somerset, New Jersey, U.S.	
Win	3-2-3 (1)	(Canada) Dean Storey	PTS	6	31/03/1996	(United States) Sullivan Gymnasium, Portland, Maine, U.S.	
Win	2-2-3 (1)	(United States) Mike Whitfield	UD	6	08/11/1995	(United States) Hyatt Regency Hotel, Baltimore, Maryland, U.S.	
Loss	1-2-3 (1)	(United States) Rodney Price	PTS	4	22/09/1995	(United States) South Mountain Arena, West Orange, New Jersey, U.S.	
Draw	1-1-3 (1)	(United States) Derrick Lampkins	PTS	4	18/08/1995	(United States) Middletown, New York, U.S.	
Win	1-1-2 (1)	(Russia) Georgy Peskov	UD	4	02/06/1995	(United States) Starlite Theatre, Latham, New York, U.S.	
Draw	0-1-2 (1)	(United States) Garth Hedger	PTS	4	05/05/1995	(United States) Center City, Schenectady, New York, U.S.	
NC	0-1-1 (1)	(United States) Domingo Monroe	NC	2	28/01/1995	(United States) Warwick, Rhode Island, U.S.	
Loss	0-1-1	(United States) Kasson Saxton	TKO	1	28/07/1994	(United States) Convention Center, Atlantic City, New Jersey, U.S.	
Draw	0-0-1	(United States) Maurice Harris	PTS	4	21/06/1994	(United States) The Roxy, Boston, Massachusetts, U.S.	
