= Javier Mora (boxer) =

Mexican boxer (born 1981)

Personal information
- Nickname: The Monster / El Monstruo
- Born: Javier Mora; May 25, 1981 (age 45) Encarnacion de Diaz, Jalisco, Mexico
- Height: 6 ft 2.5 in (189 cm)
- Weight: Heavyweight

Boxing career
- Reach: 76 in (193 cm)

Boxing record
- Total fights: 30
- Wins: 22
- Win by KO: 18
- Losses: 6
- Draws: 2
- No contests: 1

Javier Mora (born May 25, 1981) is a Mexican professional boxer in the Heavyweight division. He was defeated by Alexander Povetkin by a 5-round TKO, in Max Schmeling Halle, Prenzlauer Berg, Berlin, Germany.

== Amateur career ==
Record 23-9

== Professional career ==
Although he had won his next bout (changed to a No Contest on appeal to the California State Athletic Commission on August 7) against Canadian Kirk Johnson in March 2006 in his comeback trail. Mora appeared to have accidentally stepped on Johnson's foot, causing Johnson to dislocate his knee. This decision was subsequently appealed and the result later changed.

He fought Sultan Ibragimov on 2 weeks notice at Madison Square Garden on March 13, 2007 and referee had stopped at the 46 seconds of the first round when Mora wasn't firing back.

On March 13, 2010 he fought Alexander Povetkin only to lose on a fifth round technical knockout over Mora. In the 5th round, he had Mora cornered, launched a massive combination and sent Mora sprawling to the floor for a third time, at which time the referee waved off the bout.

=== Professional record ===
22 Wins (18 knockouts), 6 Losses(2 knockouts), 1 Draw 1 NC
Res.	Record	Opponent	Type	Rd., Time	Date	Location	Notes
Loss	22-6-1	(Russia) Alexander Povetkin	TKO	5(0:50)	2010-03-13	Max Schmeling Halle, Prenzlauer Berg, Berlin, Germany	
Loss	22-5-1	(United States) Johnathon Banks	MD	8(8)	2009-09-26	Staples Center, Los Angeles, California,	
Win	22-4-1	(United States) Jonathan Williams	KO	1(1:19)	2008-11-13	Expo Center, El Monte, California	
Loss	21-4-1	(Russia) Sultan Ibragimov	TKO	1(0:46)	2007-03-10	(New York (state)) Madison Square Garden, New York, New York	
Win	21-3-1	(United States) Earl Ladson	UD	6(6)	Jan 6, 2007	Seminole Hard Rock Hotel and Casino, Hollywood, Florida	
Win	20-3-1	(United States) Willie Herring	UD	6(6)	2006-09-14	Tachi Palace Hotel & Casino, Lemoore, California	
Loss	19-3-1	(United States) Fres Oquendo	UD	10(10)	2006-05-25	Pechanga Resort and Casino, Temecula, California	vacant WBO Latino heavyweight title
NC	19-2-1	(Canada) Kirk Johnson	NC	7(10)	2006-03-03	Pechanga Resort and Casino, Temecula, California	Result changed from TKO to No Contest due to Johnson's foot being stepped on.
Loss	18-2-1	(United States) Charles Davis	UD	8	2004-10-16	Oakland Arena, Oakland, California	
