= Shannon Briggs =

American boxer and actor (born 1971)

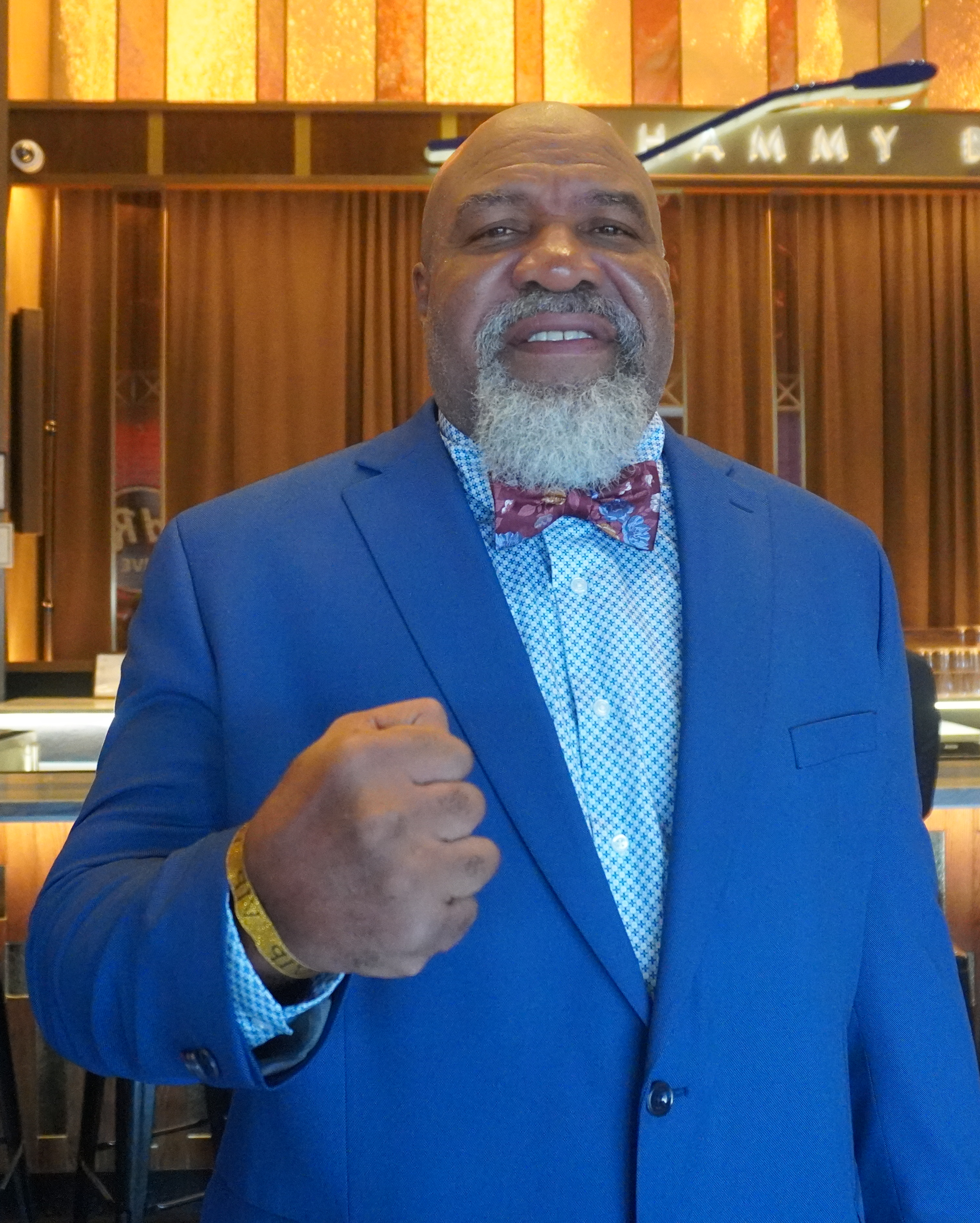
- Briggs in 2023

Personal information
- Nicknames: The Cannon; The Brownsville Yeti
- Born: December 4, 1971 (age 54) Brooklyn, New York, U.S.
- Height: 6 ft 4 in (193 cm)
- Weight: Heavyweight

Boxing career
- Reach: 80 in (203 cm)
- Stance: Orthodox

Boxing record
- Total fights: 68
- Wins: 60
- Win by KO: 53
- Losses: 6
- Draws: 1
- No contests: 1
Medal record
Men's amateur boxing
US National Championships
Gold medal – first place	1992 Colorado Springs	Heavyweight
Representing United States
Pan American Games
Silver medal – second place	1991 Havana	Heavyweight

Shannon Briggs (born December 4, 1971) is an American former professional boxer who competed between 1992 and 2016. He held the lineal heavyweight title from 1997 to 1998, and the World Boxing Organization (WBO) heavyweight title from 2006 to 2007. Nicknamed "the Cannon", Briggs was known for his formidable punching power and aggression, possessing an 88.3% knockout-to-win rate with 37 knockout wins in the first round.

== Early life ==
Briggs was born in Brooklyn, New York, and raised in the Brownsville section of Brooklyn. For a period in his childhood he was homeless. In 1983, when Briggs was 12, he saw Mike Tyson in Bristol Park, Brooklyn, New York. Briggs' friends called out, "Here comes Mike." Briggs said he was too scared to run and that seeing Tyson that day "changed his life." At age 17, Briggs began training at Jimmy O'Pharrow's Starrett City Boxing Club in Brooklyn, NY. He was diagnosed with asthma as a child. Briggs' mother died in Brownsville due to a heroin overdose on December 4, 1996, Briggs' 25th birthday.

== Amateur career ==
Coached by James O'Farrell, Briggs got his start at the Starrett City Boxing Club. Briggs competed mainly in heavyweight division (201 lbs,) he became New York City Golden Gloves champion, New York State Champion, National P.A.L. Champion and finished second at the Pan American Games in 1991, stepping into the finals on several byes, thus gaining a silver medal already without a single fight, though losing the final to Félix Savón. In 1992 he became the United States Amateur Champion. Along with two national titles in heavyweight was the winner of the 1991 Daily News Golden Gloves superheavyweight title. By December 1991 he was ranked third nationally in his class.

As an amateur he sparred with Phil Jackson, who was a pro at that time, preparing to fight Razor Ruddock. Brigg's lawyer and adviser (equivalent of pro's manager) at that time was Mike Marley, the ex-Post boxing writer. Marley later managed Briggs as a professional.

=== Highlights ===
USA−Poland Duals (heavyweight), Northern Michigan University Olympic Training Site, Marquette, Michigan, February 1991:

- Defeated Paweł Pyra (Poland) by split decision, 2–1

United States National Championships (heavyweight), Colorado Springs, Colorado, February 1991:

- 1/8: Defeated Damon Saulberry by unanimous decision, 5–0
- 1/4: Lost to Bobby Harris by unanimous decision, 0–5

National Golden Gloves (heavyweight), Des Moines, Iowa, May 1991:

- 1/4: Lost to Cedric Boswell on points

U.S. Olympic Festival (heavyweight), Colorado Springs, Colorado, July 1991:

- 1/2: Lost to John Bray on points, 16–25

(silver) Pan American Games (heavyweight), Havana, Cuba, August 1991:

- Finals: Lost to Félix Savón (Cuba) RSC 1 (Briggs knocked down at 2:08; referee stopped the contest at 2:45)

USA−Poland Duals (heavyweight), Bialystok, Poland, January 1992:

- Defeated Piotr Jurczyk (Poland) RSCH 3

(gold) United States National Championships (heavyweight), Colorado Springs, Colorado, February 1992:

- 1/8: Defeated Fred Simmons RSCH 1 (0:41)
- 1/4: Defeated Austin Thompson KO 3 (1:30)
- 1/2: Defeated James Johnson on points, 21–11
- Finals: Defeated Javier Alvarez on points, 39–27

Olympic Trials (heavyweight), Centrum, Worcester, Massachusetts, June 1992:

- 1/4: Lost to James Johnson by medical walkover (Briggs quit over a hand injury)

Briggs aimed to get a shot at the 1992 Summer Olympics in Barcelona, Spain, but quit from the national olympic trials over a hand injury.

== Professional career ==
=== Early career ===
Briggs began his career in 1992 and was undefeated in his first 25 fights, and was trained by Teddy Atlas. He suffered his first loss when he was knocked out in three rounds by undefeated Darroll Wilson in Atlantic City, New Jersey, in 1996. The fight was broadcast on HBO and was a showcase of young heavyweight fighters.

=== Lineal heavyweight champion ===
==== Briggs vs. Foreman ====
Briggs fought against lineal champion George Foreman on November 22, 1997, at the Trump Taj Majal Hotel & Casino in Atlantic City, New Jersey. Coming into the fight, Briggs sported a 29–1 record with 24 of his wins coming by way of knockout; collectively, he fought a total of 86 rounds. However, despite his record, his one loss had been a third-round knockout against Darroll "Doin' Damage" Wilson on HBO the previous year which halted his momentum and hurt his status as one of the premier up-and-coming heavyweights. However, realizing that a win over Foreman would get him back into contention, Briggs vowed to be ready for the fight stating that he was "confident that I can go in and fight for 12 rounds and win a decision."

After capturing the WBA and IBF titles from Michael Moorer late in 1994, George Foreman forfeited both titles but retained the lineal championship and successfully defended that crown (as well as the lowly regarded WBU heavyweight title) against then-undefeated prospects Crawford Grimsley and Lou Savarese. Following his win over Savarese, Foreman fought Briggs.

The fight was controversial as Briggs ultimately picked up the victory by way of majority decision. Through the course of the fight, Foreman landed more punches and had a higher percentage of his punches land than Briggs. Foreman landed 284 of his 488 punches for a 58% success rate while Briggs landed 45% of his punches, going 223 for 494. Foreman made $5 million, whilst Briggs received a $400,000 purse.

Foreman spent much of the fight as the aggressor while Briggs spent a lot of the fight retreating. In the later rounds Foreman's power punches seemed to take a toll on the younger Briggs, as he began slowing down and all but abandoned his tactic of moving away from Foreman and was hit from some heavy shots as a result. In the 12th and final round, Foreman tried hard for a knockout victory and was able to break Briggs' nose but was unable to score a knockdown. As a result, the result went to the judge's scorecards.

One judge scored the fight a draw at 114–114, while the other two had the fight scored 116–112 and 117–113 in favor of Briggs, giving him both the majority decision win and the lineal heavyweight title.

==== Briggs vs. Lewis ====
After Lennox Lewis successfully defended his WBC title in a dominating first-round knockout victory over Andrew Golota, he agreed to defend his title against the winner between Briggs-Foreman in the elimination bout organized by the WBC to determine who would become Lewis' next opponent. Though Foreman's promoters protested the result and Lewis instead turned his attention to a potential unification match with Evander Holyfield, Lewis ultimately agreed to defend his WBC championship against lineal champion Briggs in a fight billed as March Badness.

In the fifth round, Lewis knocked Briggs down for the third time with a powerful right hook at 1:09 into the round. Briggs lay flat on his back for five seconds but got back up at the count of eight and continued with the fight. After Briggs collapsed to the mat following a missed left hook, referee Frank Cappuccino stopped the fight and awarded Lewis the victory by technical knockout. Lewis earned $4 million compared to Briggs $1 million. In 2015, Lewis stated that Briggs had the fastest hands and best punching power of any opponent he ever faced.

=== Career from 1998–2006 ===
After the loss to Lennox Lewis, Briggs spent seven years fighting against low ranked opponents. He scored 17 wins (all by knockout); two losses (one by majority, one by unanimous decision); and a majority draw versus Frans Botha on 7 August 1999 in Etess Arena, Atlantic City. Notable wins were against Ray Mercer, Brian Scott, Luciano Zolyone, Dicky Ryan and Chris Koval.

=== WBO heavyweight champion ===
==== Briggs vs. Liakhovich ====
Briggs won the WBO heavyweight title when he knocked out Sergei Liakhovich in the last round of a November 4, 2006, matchup. After a lackluster 11 rounds which left the Arizona crowd restless, Briggs was losing on all three judges' scorecards 106–103, 106–103, and 105–104. Briggs pressed the fight in the 12th round and knocked Liakhovich down. Briggs subsequently trapped him on the ropes and continued his assault, knocking Liakhovich out of the ring. Liakhovich landed on a ringside table, and the referee stopped the bout. If the referee had allowed the fight to continue after the second knockdown and Liakhovich had come back into the ring within 20 seconds, it would have resulted in a draw. The official time was 2:59.

==== Briggs vs. Ibragimov ====
In his first title defense Shannon Briggs was to face Sultan Ibragimov on March 10, 2007; however, Briggs pulled out of the fight because he was diagnosed with "aspiration pneumonia." The fight was rescheduled fifty days later in Atlantic City on June 2, 2007, with Briggs losing in a unanimous decision 117–111, 119–109, and 115–113. After winning the first round, Briggs slowed down and did not have the aggressiveness, accuracy or stamina to compete with Ibragimov. At 273 pounds, Briggs was as heavy as he had been in his career. Briggs entered having won 12 consecutive fights prior to this and announced his retirement immediately following the bout.

=== Career from 2009–2010 ===
==== Miscellaneous fights ====
Briggs returned in 2009 and scored his twenty-ninth first-round knockout against Marcus McGee. After the bout, Briggs tested positive for a banned substance, and was suspended. The result of the bout was changed to 'No Contest'. Briggs manager Ivalyo Gotzev, stated Briggs was on medication to control his asthma. "He's not a steroid user or a drug user. We're consulting with his physicians and seeing how to make the proper adjustments to make sure this doesn't happen again." The New York State Athletic Commission suspended Briggs for 90 days. Briggs fought three times in 2010 before fighting Vitali Klitschko. He knocked out Rafael Pedro, Dominique Alexander and Rob Calloway all inside the first round of their respective fights.

==== Briggs vs. Vitali Klitschko ====
On October 16, 2010, Briggs fought for the WBC heavyweight title against Vitali Klitschko in the O_{2} World at Hamburg, the fight billed as 'Thunderstorm'. During the fight Briggs took a severe beating and after the fight, went down in his quarters. Briggs lost a clear unanimous decision 120–107, 120–107, and 120–105. Brought to a hospital, Briggs was initially treated in intensive care and found to have suffered a left orbital fracture, a broken nose, and a torn left biceps.

=== 2014 comeback ===
After a gap of more than three years, Briggs fought six bouts in 2014 and a further two in 2015. He won all eight, seven by knockout, earning the NABA Heavyweight title in the process.

Briggs fought in Panama against Zoltan Petranyi, knocking him out in round 1. Following the fight, former cruiserweight world champion Guillermo Jones came into the ring to confront Briggs, demanding he fight him next. At this time, Briggs was chasing a fight with then unified and lineal world champion Wladimir Klitschko and told Jones, he would fight him after he fought Klitschko. Neither fight took place in the future. Briggs gained some notoriety over videos he released of himself harassing Klitschko, particularly at sea, as the latter was paddleboarding.

=== Career from 2016–2017 ===
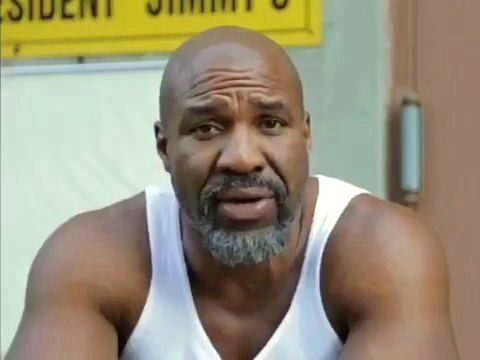
Briggs in 2016

In March 2016, Briggs confronted David Haye at his press conference for the announcement of his fight against little-known Arnold Gjergjaj at the O2 Arena on May 21, 2016. Haye did not agree to fight Briggs immediately but instead offered him the chance to fight on his undercard, promising that he would fight him next if he was victorious. Briggs agreed to this arrangement.

==== Briggs vs. Zarate ====
On May 3, 2016, it was announced that Briggs would fight 6’7-inch former European heavyweight champion, Alexander Dimitrenko (38-2, 27 KOs). His opponent was changed a few days before the fight to Jakov Gospic (17-14, 12 KOs) and then to Emilio Ezequiel Zarate (20-16-3, 11 KOs). Briggs stopped Zarate in the first round of a scheduled 10 round bout with devastating body shots. The fight was stopped at 2:22 of the round. The win for Briggs had meant he could be fighting David Haye next. The card, which was shown live on free-to-air Dave was watched by over 1 million viewers.

Despite winning on the undercard, a fight between Briggs and Haye didn't materialize. Brigg's continued to call out Haye, asking him to honor his end of the agreement. Briggs also chased Haye down in Brooklyn when both were in attendance for the Frampton vs. Santa Cruz fight. In October, Haye spoke out about the fight not taking place due to the fact that Briggs wanted the fight to be on ppv, “Because the fight can’t happen on pay-per-view ... I like people thinking I’m running from him and ducking him because when I do get in the ring with him, which I really think I will do, I think it will make it a bigger fight. But at the moment the fight can’t happen because he will only fight me if the fight is on pay-per-view. I would fight him on [UK terrestrial channel] DAVE, but he doesn't want to do that.”

==== WBA title mix ====
On November 2, 2016, the WBA ordered Briggs to fight Australian heavyweight Lucas Browne for the WBA regular title. The title became vacant after Browne defeated Ruslan Chagaev in March 2016 but was later stripped after he tested positive for drugs. The fight was ordered to take place before the end of 2016. The WBA and Browne came to a legal settlement which said he would fight for a world title next. Browne was due to fight Fres Oquendo, who hadn't fought since 2014, however that fight could not be made due to Oquendo recovering from an injury. The WBA ordered the winner of this bout to fight Oquendo in a mandatory defense within 120 days.

On November 22, VADA informed the WBC that Browne had failed a second drug test in the space of six months. After being tested positive for banned substance clenbuterol ahead of his March fight with Ruslan Chagaev, Browne this time tested positive for ostarine, a stamina-increasing substance.

On December 26, 2016 Alexander Ustinov's manager Vladimir Hryunov announced that he would be fighting for the WBA 'Regular' title on February 25, 2017, against either Briggs or Fres Oquendo. Oquendo's trainer Nate Jones later confirmed a fight with Briggs was in the works. On January 4, 2017, the WBA ordered for a deal to be reached between Briggs and Oquendo within 30 days or they would force a purse bid. Briggs told Sky Sports he wanted the fight to take place in the UK, after his increasing fan base, mostly due to Briggs spending a lot of time there pursuing a fight with David Haye.

A deal wasn't reached by February 2 and the WBA ordered a purse bid to take place on February 13, 2017. Although some promoters were interested in the fight, there were issues raised around the minimum bid of $1 million, being too high. A bid of $400,000 was made by The Heavyweight Factory representative Henry Rivalta, on behalf of Briggs however not being valid due to not meeting the minimum requirement. The WBA ordered another purse bid to take place on February 23.

On February 23, Square Ring Promotions and Hitz Entertainment Corporation announced that a deal had been reached for the Briggs vs. Oquendo fight. CEO of Square Ring Promotions John Wirt told World Boxing News, “We are really excited that we were able to reach an agreement with Kris Lawrence and Henry Rivalta of The Heavyweight Factory.” On March 16, Briggs announced via his Social Media accounts, the fight would take place June 3, 2017 at the Hard Rock Hollywood in Florida. The fight was being billed as "Backyard Brawl".

==== Cancelled world title fight and ban ====
On May 21, 2017, it was reported that Briggs had failed a drug test. He tested positive for 'dramatically increased levels of testosterone'. It was revealed that Briggs' collected sample had almost 8 times the regular amount of testosterone for a man of his age and weight. It was said that the fight would be called off, although no official decision was made. The sample was taken on May 14 and tested on May 16. It was also said that the fight was likely to be postponed after Briggs promoters failed to secure TV rights for the fight. A day later, Hitz Boxing and The Heavyweight Factory announced the fight was officially off and they would not reschedule a new date.

On July 20, 2017, Briggs was suspended for six months by the WBA and is expected to lose his #3 position in the WBA rankings. He will also likely drop out of the top 15.

=== Later career ===
On March 5, 2019, Briggs announced he would be going to the UK for a number of 'meet and greets'. Briggs told Sky Sports that he would be applying for a British boxing license in order to fight in the UK. He claimed he had licensing in the US and would likely appear on Tyson Fury's undercard on June 15 at the Thomas & Mack Center in Nevada. On May 15, 2020, Briggs told Dame Dash on Instagram Live that he and Mike Tyson will fight in an exhibition. The preferred date and location was July 4, 2020 at the Statue of Liberty. However, nothing ever came to fruition.

After a back and forth over some years, Briggs and former Ultimate Fighting Championship light heavyweight champion Quinton "Rampage" Jackson were aiming to have an exhibition boxing match in 2024. Briggs began making some noise again in 2025, when he announced a ring return to take place in Nashville, Tennessee on July 1, 2025. Jimmy Adams. the promoter of the card, hinted Briggs could fight former world champion, Oliver McCall. In an interview, Briggs himself mentioned Deontay Wilder as potential opponent. His return was scheduled to take place on the CountryBox: Where Music Meets Boxing event. During fight week, Brigg's was taken off the card and replaced by Evander Holyfield's son Evan.

== K-1 career ==
Briggs competed briefly for the K-1 kickboxing promotion in 2004. In his lone kickboxing match, he knocked out Tom Erikson, a mixed martial artist with a background in collegiate wrestling, just over a minute into round one at the K-1 World Grand Prix 2004 in Saitama in Saitama, Japan on March 27, 2004.

== Outside the ring ==
Briggs is also an actor. He made his television acting debut on New York Undercover in 1995 and has since appeared in feature films Bad Boys II, with Will Smith and Martin Lawrence, Transporter 2, and The Wackness.

Briggs also made an appearance on the Fugees' breakthrough album, The Score. He appears in the music video for rapper Thirstin Howl III's song "Surrounded By Criminals" (from his 2011 album Natural Born Skiller).

Shannon Briggs was summoned to US Federal Court District South Carolina on June 7, 2012, according to court documents Kali Bowyer, Briggs' ex-publicist, was awarded over $420,000.00 plus interest for her services.

On March 20, 2019, Briggs and Applied BioSciences had agreed a partnership deal. Applied BioSciences, a cannabinoid therapeutics company, focused on medical, bioceutical, testing and pet health industries. Briggs stated, “I have partnered with Applied BioSciences to develop and market Champ Organics because their products are made with the highest quality ingredients and all-natural CBD. I am a firm believer in the benefits that CBD delivers for joint pain and headaches. Since I have incorporated CBD to my daily supplements, I have been surprised by the positive impact it has had on my overall quality of life.”

In the fall of 2019, Shannon Briggs became the trainer for internet superstar Logan Paul for his rematch against fellow internet superstar KSI. The bout went the distance and KSI was awarded the split decision victory. Briggs became a well known figure in the influencer boxing scene, with his catchphrase "let's go champ" being the subject of several viral memes.

== Professional boxing record ==
68 fights	60 wins	6 losses
By knockout	53	2
By decision	7	4
Draws	1	
No contests	1	

No.	Result	Record	Opponent	Type	Round, time	Date	Location	Notes
68	Win	60–6–1 (1)	Emilio Zarate	KO	1 (10), 2:20	May 21, 2016	The O2 Arena, London, England	
67	Win	59–6–1 (1)	Michael Marrone	KO	2 (10), 2:52	Sep 5, 2015	Hard Rock Live, Hollywood, Florida, U.S.	
66	Win	58–6–1 (1)	Zoltan Petranyi	KO	1 (10), 1:52	Mar 27, 2015	Sortis Hotel Spa & Casino, Panama City, Panama	
65	Win	57–6–1 (1)	Richard Carmack	KO	1 (10), 2:59	Nov 1, 2014	Isle of Capri Casino, Lula, Mississippi, U.S.	
64	Win	56–6–1 (1)	Cory Phelps	TKO	1 (10), 1:18	Aug 23, 2014	Ring of Dreams Boxing Gym, Winston-Salem, North Carolina, U.S.	Retained NABA heavyweight title; Won WBC Latino interim heavyweight title
63	Win	55–6–1 (1)	Raphael Zumbano Love	UD	12	Jun 28, 2014	Remington Park, Oklahoma City, Oklahoma, U.S.	Won vacant NABA heavyweight title
62	Win	54–6–1 (1)	Matthew Greer	TKO	1 (10), 0:27	May 17, 2014	Mountaineer Casino Racetrack and Resort, New Cumberland, West Virginia, U.S.	
61	Win	53–6–1 (1)	Francisco Mireles	KO	1 (10), 0:27	Apr 19, 2014	Black Bear Casino Resort, Carlton, Minnesota, U.S.	
60	Win	52–6–1 (1)	Maurenzo Smith	KO	1 (10), 2:59	Apr 11, 2014	DoubleTree, Tampa, Florida, U.S.	
59	Loss	51–6–1 (1)	Vitali Klitschko	UD	12	Oct 16, 2010	O2 World, Hamburg, Germany	For WBC heavyweight title
58	Win	51–5–1 (1)	Rob Calloway	TKO	1 (10), 1:38	May 28, 2010	Scope, Norfolk, Virginia, U.S.	
57	Win	50–5–1 (1)	Dominique Alexander	TKO	1 (10), 0:20	May 21, 2010	Capitale, New York City, New York, U.S.	
56	Win	49–5–1 (1)	Rafael Pedro	KO	1 (10), 0:28	Apr 13, 2010	Hard Rock Live, Hollywood, Florida, U.S.	Won vacant WBC Latino heavyweight title
55	NC	48–5–1 (1)	Marcus McGee	KO	1 (8), 2:01	Dec 3, 2009	Manhattan Center Grand Ballroom, New York City, New York, U.S.	Originally a KO win for Briggs, later ruled NC after he failed a drug test
54	Loss	48–5–1	Sultan Ibragimov	UD	12	Jun 2, 2007	Boardwalk Hall, Atlantic City, New Jersey, U.S.	Lost WBO heavyweight title
53	Win	48–4–1	Siarhei Liakhovich	TKO	12 (12), 2:59	Nov 4, 2006	Chase Field, Phoenix, Arizona, U.S.	Won WBO heavyweight title
52	Win	47–4–1	Chris Koval	RTD	3 (12), 3:00	May 24, 2006	Hammerstein Ballroom, New York City, New York, U.S.	Retained NABA and NABO heavyweight titles; Won vacant USBA heavyweight title
51	Win	46–4–1	Dicky Ryan	KO	4 (12), 2:37	Mar 18, 2006	Convention Center, Fort Smith, Arkansas, U.S.	Won vacant NABA and NABO heavyweight titles
50	Win	45–4–1	Luciano Zolyone	KO	1 (12), 0:11	Dec 10, 2005	Roberto Clemente Coliseum, San Juan, Puerto Rico	Won vacant WBC FECARBOX heavyweight title
49	Win	44–4–1	Brian Scott	KO	1 (10), 1:10	Nov 26, 2005	Convention Center, Fort Smith, Arkansas, U.S.	
48	Win	43–4–1	Ray Mercer	KO	7 (10), 0:41	Aug 26, 2005	Hard Rock Live, Hollywood, Florida, U.S.	
47	Win	42–4–1	Abraham Okine	TKO	3 (10), 0:54	Jun 10, 2005	Turning Stone Resort & Casino, Verona, New York, U.S.	
46	Win	41–4–1	Demetrice King	TKO	2 (6), 1:49	Mar 3, 2005	Madison Square Garden, New York City, New York, U.S.	
45	Win	40–4–1	Jeff Pegues	TKO	1 (10), 0:35	Mar 6, 2004	Turning Stone Resort Casino, Verona, New York, U.S.	
44	Win	39–4–1	Wade Lewis	TKO	3 (8)	Aug 28, 2003	The Plex, North Charleston, South Carolina, U.S.	
43	Win	38–4–1	John Sargent	TKO	1 (12), 0:17	Jul 19, 2003	War Memorial Auditorium, Fort Lauderdale, Florida, U.S.	Won vacant IBU heavyweight title
42	Win	37–4–1	Marvin Hill	TKO	1 (10), 0:33	Mar 27, 2003	War Memorial Auditorium, Fort Lauderdale, Florida, U.S.	
41	Loss	36–4–1	Jameel McCline	UD	10	Apr 27, 2002	Madison Square Garden, New York City, New York, U.S.	
40	Win	36–3–1	Reynaldo Minus	KO	1 (8), 2:21	Dec 1, 2001	Jacob K. Javits Convention Center, New York City, New York, U.S.	
39	Win	35–3–1	Jason Waller	TKO	1 (10), 0:37	Oct 19, 2001	The Orleans, Paradise, Nevada, U.S.	
38	Win	34–3–1	Russell Chasteen	KO	1 (10), 2:55	Apr 7, 2001	Coeur d'Alene Casino Resort Hotel, Worley, Idaho, U.S.	
37	Win	33–3–1	Eric Curry	KO	1 (10), 2:34	Nov 2, 2000	Coeur d'Alene Casino Resort Hotel, Worley, Idaho, U.S.	
36	Loss	32–3–1	Sedreck Fields	MD	8	Apr 27, 2000	Hammerstein Ballroom, New York City, New York, U.S.	
35	Win	32–2–1	Warren Williams	TKO	3 (10), 2:22	Feb 24, 2000	Hammerstein Ballroom, New York City, New York, U.S.	
34	Draw	31–2–1	Francois Botha	MD	10	Aug 7, 1999	Etess Arena, Atlantic City, New Jersey, U.S.	
33	Win	31–2	Marcus Rhode	TKO	1 (10), 2:55	Dec 8, 1998	Roseland Ballroom, New York City, New York, U.S.	
32	Loss	30–2	Lennox Lewis	TKO	5 (12), 1:45	Mar 28, 1998	Convention Center, Atlantic City, New Jersey, U.S.	Lost Lineal heavyweight title; For WBC heavyweight title
31	Win	30–1	George Foreman	MD	12	Nov 22, 1997	Etess Arena, Atlantic City, New Jersey, U.S.	Won Lineal heavyweight title
30	Win	29–1	Jorge Valdes	RTD	9 (10), 3:00	Jun 24, 1997	Argosy Festival Atrium, Baton Rouge, Louisiana, U.S.	
29	Win	28–1	Melton Bowen	TKO	1 (10), 0:26	Apr 15, 1997	South Mountain Arena, West Orange, New Jersey, U.S.	
28	Win	27–1	Eric French	TKO	2 (8), 2:23	Feb 21, 1997	Mahi Temple Shrine Auditorium, Miami, Florida, U.S.	
27	Win	26–1	Tim Ray	KO	1 (10)	Sep 25, 1996	Robert Treat Hotel, Newark, New Jersey, U.S.	
26	Loss	25–1	Darroll Wilson	TKO	3 (10), 2:17	Mar 15, 1996	Convention Hall, Atlantic City, New Jersey, U.S.	
25	Win	25–0	Calvin Jones	TKO	1 (10), 0:54	Dec 15, 1995	Madison Square Garden, New York City, New York, U.S.	
24	Win	24–0	Sherman Griffin	TKO	1 (10), 1:17	Sep 22, 1995	Civic Center, Lewiston, Maine, U.S.	
23	Win	23–0	Will Hinton	TKO	1 (8), 1:50	Aug 25, 1995	Bally's, Atlantic City, New Jersey, U.S.	
22	Win	22–0	Marion Wilson	PTS	8	Mar 24, 1995	South Mountain Arena, West Orange, New Jersey, U.S.	
21	Win	21–0	Craig Payne	UD	8	Jan 13, 1995	Bally's, Atlantic City, New Jersey, U.S.	
20	Win	20–0	Mike Faulkner	KO	2	Oct 21, 1994	Palm Springs, California, U.S.	
19	Win	19–0	Mark Young	TKO	8 (8), 2:06	Aug 26, 1994	Bally's, Atlantic City, New Jersey, U.S.	
18	Win	18–0	Exum Speight	TKO	1	Aug 4, 1994	Foxwoods Resort Casino, Ledyard, Connecticut, U.S.	
17	Win	17–0	Jimmy Ellis	TKO	1 (8), 0:35	Mar 12, 1994	MGM Grand Garden Arena, Paradise, Nevada, U.S.	
16	Win	16–0	Mike Faulkner	KO	6 (6), 1:46	Feb 20, 1994	Belle Casino, Biloxi, Mississippi, U.S.	
15	Win	15–0	Danny Wofford	UD	6	Dec 9, 1993	Paramount Theatre, New York City, New York, U.S.	
14	Win	14–0	Tim Noble	TKO	3 (6), 1:04	Nov 10, 1993	Broadway By the Bay Theater, Atlantic City, New Jersey, U.S.	
13	Win	13–0	Danny Blake	PTS	6	Jul 10, 1993	Fernwood Resort, Bushkill, Pennsylvania, U.S.	
12	Win	12–0	Bruce Johnson	TKO	1 (6), 1:36	May 22, 1993	Robert F. Kennedy Memorial Stadium, Washington, D.C., U.S.	
11	Win	11–0	Ron Gullette	TKO	1 (6), 1:52	Mar 25, 1993	Broadway By the Bay Theater, Atlantic City, New Jersey, U.S.	
10	Win	10–0	Robert Pagan Perez	KO	1	Dec 9, 1992	Newark, New Jersey, U.S.	
9	Win	9–0	Rocky Bentley	PTS	4	Dec 4, 1992	Fernwood Resort, Bushkill, Pennsylvania, U.S.	
8	Win	8–0	Rick Honeycutt	TKO	1	Nov 21, 1992	Miami, Florida, U.S.	
7	Win	7–0	Tony Simpson	TKO	1	Nov 13, 1992	Revere, Massachusetts, U.S.	
6	Win	6–0	Donnie Penelton	KO	1	Oct 29, 1992	Saint Paul, Minnesota, U.S.	
5	Win	5–0	Juan Quintana	TKO	3, 1:13	Oct 9, 1992	Tiverton, Rhode Island, U.S.	
4	Win	4–0	Greg Santos	KO	1	Sep 19, 1992	Troy, New York, U.S.	
3	Win	3–0	Ed Carlson	KO	1 (4)	Aug 28, 1992	Lexington, Kentucky, U.S.	
2	Win	2–0	Cedric Sims	KO	1 (4)	Aug 6, 1992	Virginia Beach, Virginia, U.S.	
1	Win	1–0	John Basil Jackson	KO	1 (4), 1:28	Jul 24, 1992	Catskill, New York, U.S.	

== Professional kickboxing record ==
Kickboxing record
1 win (1 (T)KO), 0 losses, 0 draws
Date	Result	Opponent	Event	Location	Method	Round	Time	Record
2004-03-27	Win	(United States) Tom Erikson	K-1 World Grand Prix 2004 in Saitama	Saitama, Japan	KO (right cross)	1	1:03	1–0
Legend: Win Loss Draw/No contest Notes

== Filmography ==
=== Film ===
Year	Title	Role	Notes
2003	Bad Boys II	Haitian Gang Member	
2005	Transporter 2	Max	
2007	Three Days to Vegas	Security Guard	
2008	The Wackness	Bodyguard #1	

=== Television ===
Year	Title	Role	Notes
1993	Naked Sport	Himself	Documentary, EP Welcome to the Sewer
1995	New York Undercover	Ralphie	EP Knock You Out
2003	Trina: The Making of a Diamond Princess	Himself	Documentary
2006	Quite Frankly with Stephen A. Smith	Himself	Guest on Talk Show

Sporting positions
Amateur boxing titles
Previous: John Bray	U.S. heavyweight champion 1992	Next: Derrell Dixon
Regional boxing titles
Vacant Title last held by Timur Ibragimov	WBC FECARBOX heavyweight champion December 10, 2005 – March 2006; Vacated	Vacant Title next held by Calvin Brock
Vacant Title last held by Samuel Peter	NABA heavyweight champion March 18, 2006 – September 2006; Vacated	Vacant Title next held by Jean-François Bergeron
Vacant Title last held by Wladimir Klitschko	NABO heavyweight champion March 18, 2006 – July 2006; Vacated	Vacant Title next held by Jameel McCline
Vacant Title last held by Samuel Peter	USBA heavyweight champion May 24, 2006 – November 2006; Vacated	Vacant Title next held by Evander Holyfield
Vacant Title last held by Gonzalo Basile	WBC Latino heavyweight champion April 13, 2010 – May 2010; Vacated	Vacant Title next held by Gonzalo Basile
Vacant Title last held by Antonio Tarver	NABA heavyweight champion June 28, 2014 – November 2014; Vacated	Vacant Title next held by Jarrell Miller
Vacant Title last held by Gonzalo Omar Basile	WBC Latino heavyweight champion Interim title August 23, 2014 – November 2014; Vacated	Vacant Title next held by Raphael Zumbano Love
Minor world boxing titles
Vacant Title last held by Adnan Serin	IBU heavyweight champion July 19, 2003 – August 2003; Vacated	Vacant Title next held by Robert Hawkins
Major world boxing titles
Preceded by Siarhei Liakhovich	WBO heavyweight champion November 4, 2006 – June 2, 2007	Succeeded by Sultan Ibragimov
