= Jeff Mayweather =

American boxer (born 1964)

Personal information
- Nickname: Jazzy
- Born: July 4, 1964 (age 62) Grand Rapids, Michigan, U.S.
- Weight: Super featherweight; Lightweight; Light welterweight

Boxing career
- Stance: Orthodox

Boxing record
- Total fights: 47
- Wins: 32
- Win by KO: 11
- Losses: 10
- Draws: 5

Jeff Mayweather (born July 4, 1964) is an American former professional boxer who competed from 1988 to 1997, and held the IBO super featherweight title from 1994 to 1995. He has since worked as a boxing and mixed martial arts trainer.

== Professional career ==
Mayweather had a career boxing record of 32–10–5 (10 KOs). His biggest accomplishment was winning the IBO junior lightweight title from John Roby on April 21, 1994, a title which he defended two times. On March 13, 1993, Mayweather lost to Oscar De La Hoya, who was in only his 5th pro bout, by TKO in round 4.

== Boxing ==
After a successful career in the ring, Mayweather followed in the footsteps of his brothers and became a trainer. Known as the "Quiet Mayweather" Mayweather has trained several champions including Sultan Ibragimov, Celestino Caballero and for a short period Floyd Mayweather Jr.

On October 14, 2011, he led Caballero down to Argentina where they captured the WBA featherweight title from Jonathon Barros. Jeff Mayweather is current boxing coach for Pakistani Boxer Muhammad Waseem who is known to be Pakistan's first professional boxer to have ever held a WBC title. He is the Current WBC Silver Flyweight Champion.

== Internet ventures ==
Mayweather has also launched a website called "Jeff Mayweather's Pro Boxing Insider". He says it will allow boxing fans to get an inside look at the sport, and will have several boxers serve as active contributors. The site also boasts a forum that allows fans to ask questions of the fighters. Mayweather was team adviser for internet personality KSI's 2nd YouTube boxing match against fellow internet personality Logan Paul.

== Personal life ==
He is a member of the Mayweather boxing family: his brothers are former welterweight contender Floyd Mayweather Sr. and two-division world champion Roger Mayweather, and his nephew is five-division world champion Floyd Mayweather Jr.

Mayweather attended Ottawa Hills High School, in Grand Rapids, Michigan as a member of the class of 1981.

While Mayweather pursued a degree in Graphic Arts from Western Michigan University in Kalamazoo, Michigan, he competed in the 1987 National Golden Gloves.

Mayweather has indicated he has diabetes, which he currently treats using "traditional methods".

== Professional boxing record ==
47 fights	32 wins	10 losses
By knockout	10	2
By decision	22	8
Draws	5	

No.	Result	Record	Opponent	Type	Round, time	Date	Location	Notes
47	Win	32–10–5	Eric Jakubowski	UD	8	Mar 12, 1997	Stadium Arena, Grand Rapids, Michigan, U.S.	
46	Win	31–10–5	Tony Duran	UD	8	Feb 13, 1997	The Aladdin, Paradise, Nevada, U.S.	
45	Loss	30–10–5	Benjie Marquez	SD	12	May 9, 1996	Denver, Colorado, U.S.	For vacant World Boxing Board lightweight title
44	Draw	30–9–5	Paquito Openo	PTS	8	Mar 1, 1996	Sheraton Waikiki Hotel, Honolulu, Hawaii, U.S.	
43	Loss	30–9–4	Hiroyuki Sakamoto	MD	10	Nov 25, 1995	The Mirage, Paradise, Nevada, U.S.	
42	Loss	30–8–4	Israel Cardona	UD	12	Aug 25, 1995	Silver Nugget, North Las Vegas, Nevada, U.S.	Lost IBO super featherweight title
41	Win	30–7–4	Martin Ramirez	UD	8	Jun 8, 1995	Silver Nugget, North Las Vegas, Nevada, U.S.	
40	Loss	29–7–4	Jesse James Leija	UD	10	May 2, 1995	Arizona Charlie's Boulder, Paradise, Nevada, U.S.	
39	Draw	29–6–4	Omar Pacheco	TD	2 (10)	Apr 13, 1995	Silver Nugget, North Las Vegas, Nevada, U.S.	Unanimous TD after the fight was stopped due to a power cut in the area
38	Draw	29–6–3	Omar Pacheco	TD	2 (10)	Jan 3, 1995	Silver Nugget, North Las Vegas, Nevada, U.S.	TD after Pacheco was cut from an accidental head clash
37	Loss	29–6–2	Eduardo Perez	SD	10	Jan 3, 1995	The Aladdin, Paradise, Nevada, U.S.	
36	Win	29–5–2	Ramon Sanchez	UD	10	Dec 8, 1994	Silver Nugget, North Las Vegas, Nevada, U.S.	
35	Win	28–5–2	Mark Smith	TKO	11 (12), 2:29	Oct 13, 1994	Peppermill Resort, Mesquite, Nevada, U.S.	Retained IBO super featherweight title
34	Win	27–5–2	Jose Teran Torres	KO	4 (10), 0:39	Sep 15, 1994	Silver Nugget, North Las Vegas, Nevada, U.S.	
33	Win	26–5–2	Gabriel Castro	RTD	8 (12), 3:00	Jul 8, 1994	Silver Nugget, North Las Vegas, Nevada, U.S.	Retained IBO super featherweight title
32	Win	25–5–2	John Roby	UD	12	Apr 21, 1994	Silver Nugget, North Las Vegas, Nevada, U.S.	Won IBO super featherweight title
31	Win	24–5–2	Jorge Palomares	KO	6 (10), 1:58	Mar 31, 1994	Silver Nugget, North Las Vegas, Nevada, U.S.	
30	Loss	23–5–2	Joey Gamache	UD	12	Jan 28, 1994	Civic Center, Lewiston, Maine, U.S.	For vacant NABF light welterweight title
29	Loss	23–4–2	John Avila	MD	10	Jan 12, 1994	Silver Nugget, North Las Vegas, Nevada U.S.	
28	Loss	23–3–2	Oscar De La Hoya	TKO	4 (8), 1:35	Mar 13, 1993	Las Vegas Hilton, Winchester, Nevada, U.S.	
27	Draw	23–2–2	Jorge Romero	MD	10	Dec 26, 1992	Sahara Hotel, Winchester, Nevada, U.S.	
26	Loss	23–2–1	Todd Foster	TKO	8 (10), 1:59	Aug 6, 1992	Denton Field, Miles City, Montana, U.S.	
25	Win	23–1–1	Rowdy Welch	UD	10	May 7, 1992	Bozeman, Montana, U.S.	
24	Win	22–1–1	Oldemar Soto	UD	10	Feb 29, 1992	Union Plaza Hotel and Casino, Las Vegas, Nevada, U.S.	
23	Win	21–1–1	Martin Ochoa	TKO	2 (10), 2:59	Jan 21, 1992	Union Plaza Hotel and Casino, Las Vegas, Nevada, U.S.	
22	Win	20–1–1	Jesus Rodriguez	UD	10	Dec 26, 1991	Bally's Las Vegas, Paradise, Nevada, U.S.	
21	Win	19–1–1	Juan Carlos Alvarado	UD	10	Sep 13, 1991	Union Plaza Hotel and Casino, Las Vegas, Nevada, U.S.	
20	Win	18–1–1	Eduardo Gonzalez	TKO	2 (10), 2:07	Aug 8, 1991	Union Plaza Hotel and Casino, Las Vegas, Nevada, U.S.	
19	Win	17–1–1	Marco Antonio Ramirez	UD	10	Jul 6, 1991	Union Plaza Hotel and Casino, Las Vegas, Nevada, U.S.	
18	Win	16–1–1	Jose Luis Calderon	TKO	6 (8), 1:28	Jun 2, 1991	Union Plaza Hotel and Casino, Las Vegas, Nevada, U.S.	
17	Loss	15–1–1	Clark Earls	MD	8	Apr 24, 1991	Hacienda, Paradise, Nevada, U.S.	
16	Win	15–0–1	Jorge Rodriguez	UD	8	Mar 13, 1991	Hacienda, Paradise, Nevada, U.S.	
15	Win	14–0–1	Gerardo Sanchez	UD	8	Feb 20, 1991	Hacienda, Paradise, Nevada, U.S.	
14	Win	13–0–1	Lorenzo Garcia	UD	8	Dec 27, 1990	Hacienda, Paradise, Nevada, U.S.	
13	Win	12–0–1	Art Blackmore	TKO	7 (8), 1:26	Nov 21, 1990	Hacienda, Paradise, Nevada, U.S.	
12	Win	11–0–1	Ramon Zavala	UD	6	Apr 7, 1990	Las Vegas Hilton, Winchester, Nevada, U.S.	
11	Win	10–0–1	Conrad Lugo	UD	6	Feb 26, 1990	Great Western Forum, Inglewood, California, U.S.	
10	Win	9–0–1	Jesus Morquecho	KO	3 (4), 1:01	Dec 9, 1989	Lawlor Events Center, Reno, Nevada, U.S.	
9	Win	8–0–1	John Almaguer	MD	6	Aug 1, 1989	Showboat Hotel and Casino, Las Vegas, Nevada, U.S.	
8	Win	7–0–1	Damion Sutton	UD	6	Feb 24, 1989	Bally's Las Vegas, Paradise, Nevada, U.S.	
7	Win	6–0–1	Ricardo Cruz	KO	3	Dec 16, 1988	Bally's Las Vegas, Paradise, Nevada, U.S.	
6	Win	5–0–1	Manuel Gallegos	PTS	4	Nov 22, 1988	Bally's Las Vegas, Paradise, Nevada, U.S.	
5	Win	4–0–1	Jose Lupe Lopez	MD	4	Nov 3, 1988	Showboat Hotel and Casino, Las Vegas, Nevada, U.S.	
4	Win	3–0–1	Noe Lopez	UD	4	Sep 24, 1988	Bally's Las Vegas, Paradise, Nevada, U.S.	
3	Draw	2–0–1	Pedro Moreno	MD	4	Aug 6, 1988	Showboat Hotel and Casino, Las Vegas, Nevada, U.S.	
2	Win	2–0	Ruben Macklis	PTS	4	Jun 17, 1988	Showboat Hotel and Casino, Las Vegas, Nevada, U.S.	
1	Win	1–0	Eddie Doran	PTS	4	Apr 23, 1988	Showboat Hotel and Casino, Las Vegas, Nevada, U.S.	

== See also ==
- Notable boxing families#United States

Sporting positions
Minor world boxing titles
Preceded by John Roby	IBO super featherweight champion April 21, 1994 – August 25, 1995	Succeeded by Israel Cardona
