= Samuel Peter vs. James Toney II =

Boxing match

Redemption
- Date: January 6, 2007
- Venue: Seminole Hard Rock Hotel & Casino Hollywood, Hollywood, Florida, U.S.
- Title(s) on the line: NABF Heavyweight Title; WBC Heavyweight Title Eliminator

Tale of the tape
Boxer	Samuel Peter	James Toney
Nickname	The Nigerian Nightmare	Lights Out
Hometown	Akwa Ibom, Nigeria	Grand Rapids, Michigan, U.S.
Purse	$1,500,000	$1,100,000
Pre-fight record	27–1 (22 KO)	69–5–3 (1) (42 KO)
Age	26 years, 4 months	38 years, 4 months
Height	6 ft 2 in (188 cm)	5 ft 9 in (175 cm)
Weight	249 lb (113 kg)	234 lb (106 kg)
Style	Orthodox	Orthodox
Recognition	WBC; No. 1 Ranked Heavyweight; WBO; No. 2 Ranked Heavyweight; The Ring; No. 3 Ranked Heavyweight; NABF; Heavyweight Champion	WBC; No. 2 Ranked Heavyweight; The Ring; No. 4 Ranked Heavyweight; 3-division world champion

Result
- Peter wins via unanimous decision (119–108, 118–110, 118–110)

Samuel Peter vs. James Toney II, billed as Redemption, was a professional boxing match contested on September 2, 2006, for the NABF heavyweight title.

== Background ==
Heavyweight title contenders Samuel Peter and James Toney had fought four months prior in WBC heavyweight title eliminator in which the winner would become the number-one contender to then-reigning WBC heavyweight champion Oleg Maskaev. In a closely contested bout, Peter was named the winner by split decision, being named winner on two of the judge's scorecards while Toney, having suffered his first loss in over nine years, had been ruled the victor by the third judge. Toney, having landed 64 punches more than Peter and at a much higher percentage, expressed disdain for the decision, stating after the fight "I didn't lose this fight. I took everything away from him, I'm not done with this punk."

Toney's promoter Dan Goossen approached Peter's promoter Dino Duva about an immediate rematch, but Duva and Peter declined, wishing to instead move on to challenge Maskaev for the WBC heavyweight title early the following year. This decision would cause Goossen to officially appeal Peter's victory to the WBC and the organization's board of governors voted 21–10 in favor of a Peter–Toney rematch with the fight once again being declared a WBC heavyweight title eliminator. With Peter temporarily losing his mandatory title fight against Maskaev, both he and Duva expressed disappointment but Duva announced that would nevertheless honor the WBC's request for a rematch with Duva stating that Peter was "not happy about it and he doesn't think it's fair. But at the same time, he will honor what the WBC did and beat James more convincingly the next time."

== The fight ==
The fight was in stark contrast to their previous encounter as Peter dominated Toney from the opening bell and was named the winner by a lopsided unanimous decision, securing two scores 118–110 (both judges having had Peter winning 10 rounds and Toney only two) and one score of 119–109 (Peter winning all but one round). After having fell well short of Toney in punches landed during their previous fight, Peter improved dramatically for this fight, landing 281 punches to Toney's 194 with the fighter's success rate almost even with 41% for Peter and 44% for Toney. Peter would score the fight's only knockdown, catching Toney with a left jab to the chin 10 seconds into the second round, becoming the first fighter to score a knockdown over Toney since Roy Jones Jr. over 12 years earlier.

== Fight card ==
Confirmed bouts:

Weight Class	Weight		vs.		Method	Round	Notes
Heavyweight	200+ lbs.	Samuel Peter (c)	def.	James Toney	UD	12/12	^{note 1}
Super Welterweight	154 lbs.	Travis Simms	def.	José Antonio Rivera (c)	TKO	9/12	^{note 2}
Middleweight	160 lbs.	Roman Karmazin	def.	James Obede Toney	TKO	4/10
Heavyweight	200+ lbs.	Guillermo Jones	def.	Jeremy Bates	TKO	1/8
Super Middleweight	168 lbs.	Laura Ramsey	def.	Ijeoma Egbunine	TKO	1/6x2
Lightweight	135 lbs.	Anges Adjaho	def.	Armando Cordoba	UD	6/6
Heavyweight	200+ lbs.	Javier Mora	def.	Earl Ladson	UD	6/6
Heavyweight	200+ lbs.	Bermane Stiverne	def.	Otis Mills	TKO	1/6
Welterweight	147 lbs.	Devon Alexander	def.	Maximino Cuevas	TKO	4/4

^Note 1 For NABF heavyweight title
^Note 2 For WBA Super Welterweight title

== Broadcasting ==
Country	Broadcaster
United States	Showtime

Preceded by First bout	Samuel Peter's bouts 6 January 2007	Succeeded by vs. Jameel McCline
Preceded by First bout	James Toney's bouts 6 January 2007	Succeeded by vs. Danny Batchelder
