= Samuel Peter vs. Vitali Klitschko =

Boxing event

Dangerzone
- Date: 11 October 2008
- Venue: O2 World, Kreuzberg, Berlin, Germany
- Title(s) on the line: WBC Heavyweight Championship

Tale of the tape
Boxer	(Nigeria) Samuel Peter	(Ukraine) Vitali Klitschko
Nickname	"The Nigerian Nightmare"	"Dr. Ironfist"
Hometown	Akwa Ibom, Nigeria	Kyiv, Kyiv Oblast, Ukraine
Pre-fight record	30–1 (23 KO)	35–2 (34 KO)
Age	28 years, 1 month	37 years, 2 months
Height	6 ft 2 in (188 cm)	6 ft 7 in (201 cm)
Weight	254 lb (115 kg)	274 lb (124 kg)
Style	Orthodox	Orthodox
Recognition	WBC; Heavyweight Champion; The Ring; No. 2 Ranked Heavyweight	WBC; Heavyweight "Champion Emeritus"

Result
- Klitschko wins via 8th-round RTD

Samuel Peter vs. Vitali Klitschko, billed as Dangerzone, was a professional boxing match contested on 11 October 2008, for the WBC heavyweight championship.

== Background ==
After winning the WBC title against Oleg Maskaev, Samuel Peter entered into negotiations for a mandatory defence against former champion Vitali Klitschko, who was returning from an almost four year retirement. Klitschko had been set for a tune up bout with Jameel McCline in September 2007 before a back injury forced him to withdraw. In May 2008 an agreement was reached for the two to face off at O2 World Berlin in October. Peter's only previous defeat came at the hands of Vitali's younger brother Wladimir in September 2005.

As his brother had also become a Heavyweight champion during his absence from the ring, Vitali was hoping to become part of the first pair of brothers to hold versions of the heavyweight title simultaneously.

Speaking to the tabloid newspaper Bild in the build up to the bout, Klitschko said "I'm still the same Vitali. I'm ambitious, mentally strong and hard working. It's not really a comeback for me, more like a fight between two world champions after injury."

Klitschko was the 1 to 4 on favorite to win.

== The fight ==
Klitschko dominated the bout, utilising his left jab and landing powerful hooks to Peter's body and head. The much younger Peter kept a tight defensive stance and did manage to land a number of solid body shots on Klitschko however he wasn't able to consistently get inside Klitschko's massive reach. At the end of the eighth round Peter informed his corner that he did not want to continue, making Klitschko a two time Heavyweight Champion (three time if the then lightly regarded WBO belt is included). At the time he trailed on all three scorecards with two scoring it an 80–72 shutout and the other had it 79–73 giving Peter one round.

== Aftermath ==
Vitali's victory meant that between himself and his brother, they held three of the four major title belts, with only the WBA title (held by Nikolai Valuev) left. The WBC would order Vitali to make the first defence of his second reign as Heavyweight Champion against former WBC Cruiserweight champion Juan Carlos Gómez, who had won a "final eliminator" in September against Vladimir Virchis.

== Undercard ==
Confirmed bouts:

== Broadcasting ==
Country	Broadcaster
Germany	RTL
Hungary	RTL Klub
Ireland & United Kingdom	Setanta Sports
United States	Showtime

Preceded by vs. Oleg Maskaev	Samuel Peter's bouts 11 October 2008	Succeeded by vs. Eddie Chambers
Preceded by vs. Danny Williams	Vitali Klitschko's bouts 11 October 2008	Succeeded by vs. Juan Carlos Gómez
