= Eddie Chambers =

American boxer (born 1982)

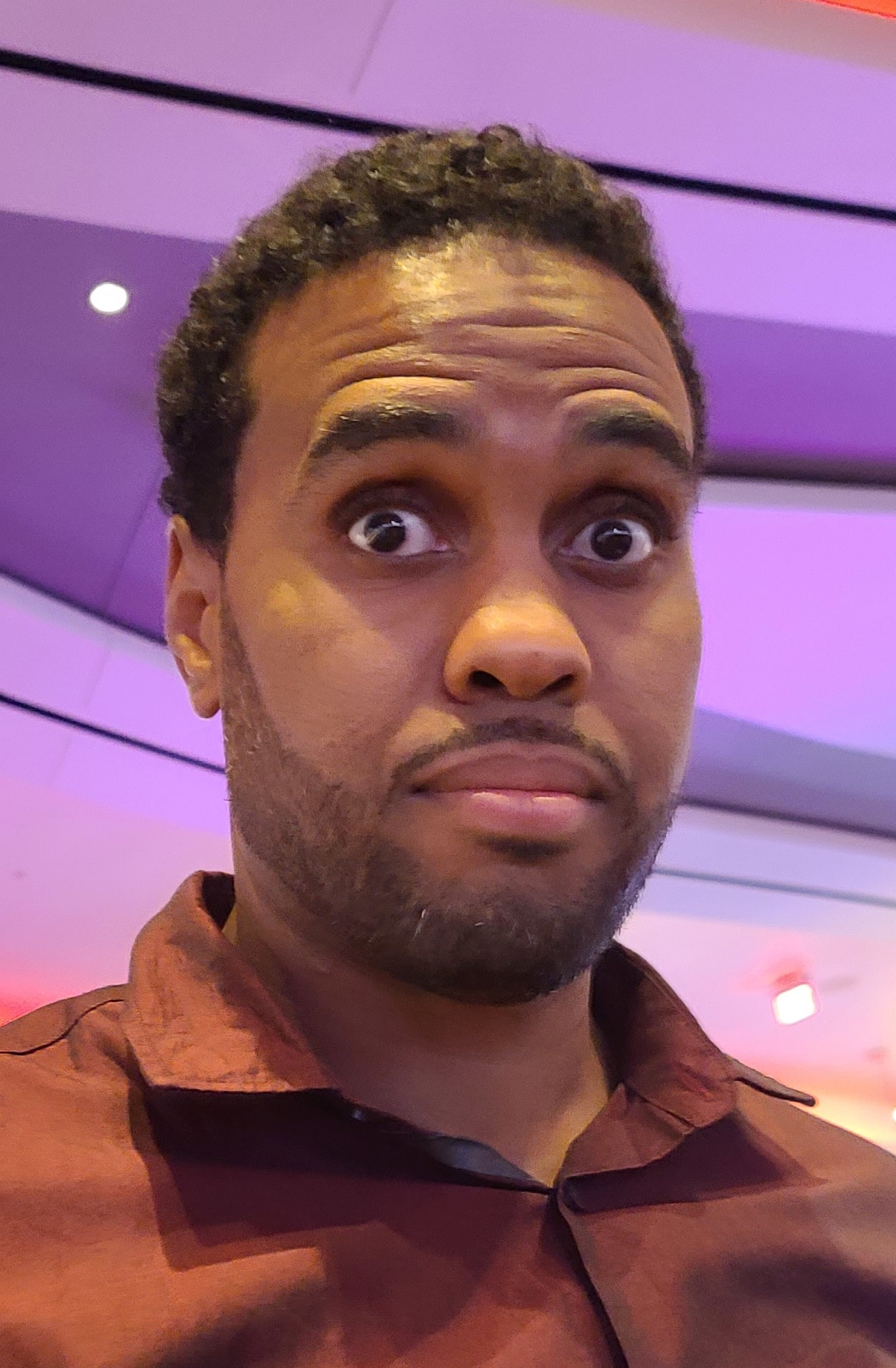
- Chambers in 2021

Personal information
- Nickname: Fast
- Born: Edward Chambers; March 29, 1982 (age 44) Pittsburgh, Pennsylvania, U.S.
- Height: 6 ft 1 in (185 cm)
- Weight: Heavyweight

Boxing career
- Reach: 76.5 in (194 cm)
- Stance: Orthodox

Boxing record
- Total fights: 48
- Wins: 43
- Win by KO: 24
- Losses: 5

Edward Chambers (born March 29, 1982) is an American former professional boxer who competed between 2000 and 2023. He challenged once for a unified world heavyweight title in 2010. He was ranked as the fourth best heavyweight in the world by The Ring at the conclusion of 2009. A defensively-oriented fighter, Chambers has been widely credited for his counterpunching skills and particularly praised for his hand speed and footwork. He has also been one of the first heavyweights with ability to switch between fighting orthodox and southpaw.

== Amateur career ==
As an amateur, Chambers was trained by his father Eddie Chambers, Sr. In total, Chambers won over 80 bouts, winning the 1999 amateur Pennsylvania state heavyweight title.

== Professional career ==
Eddie made his professional boxing debut in 2000 at the age of 18, defeating Tyrone Austin by second-round TKO. In the span of five years, Chambers won 22 fights in a row before facing his first notable opponent, Ross Puritty, who had faced another prospect Alexander Dimitrenko six months prior in a losing effort. Chambers won the fight by unanimous decision (UD), with scores 99–91, 98–92 and 99–91. He then defeated local rival Robert Hawkins, winning the Pennsylvania heavyweight title. In 2006, Chambers faced another notable fighter, former WBO world heavyweight title challenger Ed Mahone. Coming into the fight, Mahone had 23–6–2 record, with all of his wins coming inside the distance. Chambers won the fight by fourth-round TKO.

With a perfect 27–0 record, Chambers faced another undefeated fighter, 15–0 Derric Rossy, for the USBA heavyweight title. Chambers dominated Rossy throughout the fight, ultimately giving him his first career loss after the referee stopped the fight in round 7, preventing battered and bruised Rossy from continuing absorbing punishment. Rossy eventually suffered his second loss at the hands of Alexander Dimitrenko by fifth-round TKO. Meahwhile, Chambers faced his toughest challenge to date in Dominick Guinn just three months later. Guinn, once described as "hot prospect" and viewed as one of the top-rising American heavyweight contenders, was 3–2–1 in his last six fights, losing to James Toney and Tony Thompson by unanimous decisions but defeating then-highly regarded prospest, Olympic Gold medalist Audley Harrison. Guinn was also known for his durability, having never been stopped in his entire career. Chambers defeated Guinn by a lopsided unanimous decision.

The win over Dominick Guinn earned Chambers a spot in the 4-man elimination tournament to face Wladimir Klitschko for the IBF world heavyweight championship. In semifinals, Chambers faced Calvin Brock, who had challenged Klitschko for the IBF title a year prior. Brock, who had beaten a handful of heavyweight contenders and prospects throughout his career, such as Jameel McCline, Timur Ibragimov and Clifford Etienne, claimed to be in the best shape of his career. Brock weighed in at 241 lbs, the heaviest in his entire career and almost 17 lbs heavier than in his bout against Klitschko. The additional weight appeared to be muscle.

The fight took place at Emerald Queen Casino in Tacoma, Washington and was aired live on Showtime. Chambers appeared to have the upper hand in the fight, effectively using his hand speed and upper-body movement, and was declared the winner by split decision, with two judges scoring the bout 115–113 in favor of Chambers, while the third judge had the same score but in favor of Brock. Chambers damaged Brock's right eye during the bout, which, after subsequent botched surgery, prompted Brock to retire from the sport.

In the final, which took place less than three months later, Chambers faced undefeated Alexander Povetkin, who had beaten former IBF world champion Chris Byrd in semifinals by eleventh-round TKO. The bout took place in Berlin, Germany. Chambers was doing the better work in early rounds, landing cleaner, harder shots, but was eventually overwhelmed by Povetkin's relentless pressure. Ultimately the bout went the distance, with Povetkin being declared the winner by unanimous decision. The scores were 117–111, 116–112 and 119–109.

After his fight with Povetkin he won three more bouts, including one against Raphael Butler, before facing Samuel Peter on March 27, 2009. Peter, ranked No.6 heavyweight in the world by The Ring, was 5-1 in the last six bouts, having had scored wins over James Toney (twice) and former heavyweight contender Jameel McCline before beating Oleg Maskaev by sixth-round TKO to become WBC world heavyweight champion. Prior to facing Chambers, however, Peter had lost the world championship to Vitali Klitschko, and was looking to bounce back to the heavyweight title picture. The fight took place at Nokia Theatre in Los Angeles, and was aired on ESPN2. Chambers injured his right thumb early in the third round, but was able to outbox Peter for the majority of the fight, frustrating his opponent with speed and quickness and blocking most of Peter's shots using his gloves and arms. As a result, Chambers was declared the winner by majority decision, with judges scoring the bout 99–91, 96–94 and 95–95. Some observers criticized the 95–95 score, believing Peter had not done enough to win more than three rounds.

A win over Peter lined Chambers up to fight 6 ft 7in tall, undefeated Alexander Dimitrenko on July 4, 2009 in a WBO world heavyweight title eliminator. Coming into the bout, Dimitrenko had scored five stoppages in a row, with his most recent win against popular German boxer Luan Krasniqi. At the time of the fight, Chambers was ranked No.6 heavyweight contender by The Ring, while Dimitrenko was ranked No.8 by the same publication. Dimitrenko was also ranked within top 5 by all major sanctioning bodies. Chambers weighed in at 208 1/4 lbs, the lightest since 2003. Chambers was outweighed by Dimitrenko by 45 1/2 lbs.

The fight took place at Color Line Arena in Hamburg, Germany. It was Chambers' second fight in Germany. The event was televised by ZDF. Unlike his previous fights, Chambers was the aggressor, taking the centre of the ring and constantly pressing Dimitrenko against the ropes. After putting pressure and slowing down Dimitrenko's left arm in the early rounds, Chambers established his rhythm by the fifth, successfully finding his way inside Dimitrenko's jab. Dimitrenko received a standing count in the seventh round after a left hook to the body, and was knocked down in the tenth after another left hook, this time to the chin. Chambers won the fight by majority decision. The judges scored the bout 117–109, 116–111 and 113–113, with some experts criticizing the 113–113 score.

=== Chambers vs. Klitschko ===
The win made Chambers the mandatory challenger for the WBO world heavyweight title held by Wladimir Klitschko. In the build-up to the fight, Klitschko described Chambers as "the best American heavyweight right now". Coming into the bout, Chambers was ranked No.3 heavyweight contender by The Ring, whereas Wladimir was the magazine's champion. In the pre-fight comparison of the fighters, The Ring gave Chambers the upper hand in speed and athletic ability, as well as defense, while crediting Klitschko as more powerful and experienced. The fight generated little interest in the United States, where it was not televised by any TV station but was aired on the Klitschko's official website instead. The official venue was the multi-functional football stadium ESPRIT Arena in Dusseldorf, Germany.

The bout turned-out to be one-sided, with the champion winning rounds keeping Chambers at the end of his jab and occasionally throwing straight right hands. In the opening rounds, Chambers lifted Klitschko and took him down several times but was not deducted a point nor warned. In between the championship rounds, Klitschko was criticized by his trainer Emmanuel Steward for not fighting aggressively, despite comfortably winning on the scorecards. Klitschko picked up his pace during the final round and, with few seconds left, landed a left hook on Chambers' temple. Chambers fell partially through the ropes and was reportedly unconscious for a few minutes after the bout ended.

=== Post-Klitschko fights; injuries and inactivity ===
Chambers returned to the ring almost eleven months later, defeating Derric Rossy again, this time by unanimous decision, in an IBF title eliminator. He was scheduled to face Tony Thompson on 28 October 2011 in a bout televised by Showtime, but had to pull out due to spinal injury. Chambers claimed to have problems with his back for an extended period of time, and that it finally caught up to him during preparation for the Thompson fight. He was then due to face former WBO world heavyweight champion Siarhei Liakhovich on 21 January 2012 at Asylum Arena in Philadelphia, in the inaugural main event of the Fight Night card televised by NBC Sports, but was forced to withdraw after fracturing his ribs during training camp.

Chambers returned to the ring sixteen months later, against former WBC light-heavyweight and IBF and The Ring cruiserweight champion Tomasz Adamek for the vacant IBF North American heavyweight title. Both Adamek and Chambers were praised for taking the fight with no world title nor mandatory position on the line, with Adamek trying to re-establish himself after the tenth-round TKO loss to Vitali Klitschko. Coming into the fight, Adamek was ranked No.3 heavyweight contender by The Ring, while Chambers, who had had only one fight in the last two years and three months, was unranked by the publication. The fight was the main event of the Fight Night card on NBC Sports. In the opening rounds, both fighters were trading shots, with Chambers landing the most meaningful punches. During the first round, Chambers torn his bicep in the left arm, and often switched between orthodox and southpaw stances throughout the rest of the fight, throwing shots almost exclusively with the right hand, mostly connecting with overhand punches. Adamek was more active since round 3, frequently switching up from counterpuncher to aggressor. The bout lasted full twelve rounds, with Adamek being declared the winner by unanimous decision with scores 116–112 (twice) and 119–109. Most observers thought that the bout was close, with many of them criticizing the 119–109 score. According to CompuBox, 1,381 punches were thrown, with Chambers landing 152 punches out of 462 thrown (32.9% accuracy), while Adamek landed 134 punches out of 919 (14.6%). Chambers outlanded Adamek in rounds 1–5, 7, 8, 10 and 11. He also landed more power shots in nine of the twelve rounds.

In early 2012, then undefeated prospect Deontay Wilder called out Chambers for a step-up fight along with David Price. By late 2012, Tyson Fury was in talks with promoter Kathy Duva to fight Chambers in a similar step-up fight, however talks stalled due to the injury sustained in the Adamek fight.

Chambers made his return to the ring fourteen months later, moving down to cruiserweight to fight South African contender Thabiso Mchunu. Having had fought only twice in three and a half years prior to the bout, Chambers gave a relatively poor showing and lost the fight by unanimous decision. Enamored with his unique skill set, from 2013 to 2015, Chambers was signed by Team Fury and based in the United Kingdom trained by Peter Fury, who was then-trainer of unified heavyweight champion Tyson Fury, and heavyweight contender Hughie Fury. Chambers is credited with helping teach Tyson Fury his defensive style of "slick American boxing". After failing to secure any major world title shots despite being ranked in the top five in the world by multiple sanctioning organizations, Chambers then signed with manager Al Haymon and made his U.S. return in late 2015, defeating journeyman Galen Brown by third-round TKO. He then faced Gerald Washington on Premier Boxing Champions on Fox, losing the bout by a lopsided unanimous decision. Following the loss, Chambers subsequently retired from the sport.

=== Comeback ===
On November 17, 2017, World Heavyweight Champion Anthony Joshua called out and sent Chambers a threatening racist-filled message calling him a "Disgrace to the superior black race", in hopes to lure Chambers back into the ring after years of back-and-forth messages exchanged through the UK boxing media. Former sparring partner and team member Tyson Fury came on record defending Chambers saying that Joshua finally showed his true colors.

On February 7, 2023, at age 40, Chambers made his return to the ring after a near 7 year lay-off with a 3rd-round TKO victory against Corey Williams. Chambers weighed in as a heavyweight at 226 ¾ lbs. Per trainers James Ali Bashir and Steve Upsher, Chambers will look to compete at heavyweight but keep close attention to a newer WBC weight class of bridgerweight, which falls between 200 and 224-pounds.

== Other media ==
Chambers appeared in the 2009 video game Fight Night Round 4, as well as Fight Night Champion. He also commentated for the UK boxing TV channel BoxNation, and makes occasional appearances as a panelist on the BoxHard Podcast. Eddie also appears frequently on the Coach Anthony YouTube channel and instructional videos.

== Professional boxing record ==
48 fights	43 wins	5 losses
By knockout	24	1
By decision	19	4

No.	Result	Record	Opponent	Type	Round, time	Date	Location	Notes
48	Win	43–5	Corey Williams	TKO	3 (8), 1:10	Feb 7, 2023	Texas Troubadour Theatre, Nashville, Tennessee, U.S.	
47	Loss	42–5	Gerald Washington	UD	8	Apr 30, 2016	StubHub Center, Carson, California, U.S.	
46	Win	42–4	Galen Brown	TKO	3 (8), 1:34	Sep 18, 2015	The Claridge Hotel, Atlantic City, New Jersey, U.S.	
45	Win	41–4	Dorian Darch	TKO	3 (8), 2:20	Nov 29, 2014	ExCeL, London, England	
44	Win	40–4	Marcelo Nascimento	PTS	8	Nov 8, 2014	Bluewater, Stone, England	
43	Win	39–4	Carl Baker	RTD	3 (8), 3:00	May 17, 2014	Town Hall, Leeds, England	
42	Win	38–4	Moses Matovu	TKO	1 (6), 1:10	Apr 12, 2014	Copper Box Arena, London, England	
41	Win	37–4	Tomas Mrazek	TKO	6 (6), 2:35	Mar 29, 2014	Metro Radio Arena, Newcastle, England	
40	Loss	36–4	Thabiso Mchunu	UD	10	Aug 3, 2013	Mohegan Sun Arena, Montville, Connecticut, U.S.	
39	Loss	36–3	Tomasz Adamek	UD	12	Jun 16, 2012	Prudential Center, Newark, New Jersey, U.S.	For vacant IBF North American heavyweight title
38	Win	36–2	Derric Rossy	UD	12	Feb 11, 2011	Bally's, Atlantic City, New Jersey, U.S.	
37	Loss	35–2	Wladimir Klitschko	KO	12 (12), 2:55	Mar 20, 2010	ESPRIT arena, Düsseldorf, Germany	For IBF, WBO, IBO, and The Ring heavyweight titles
36	Win	35–1	Alexander Dimitrenko	MD	12	Jul 4, 2009	Color Line Arena, Hamburg, Germany	
35	Win	34–1	Samuel Peter	MD	10	Mar 27, 2009	Nokia Theatre L.A. Live, Los Angeles, California, U.S.	
34	Win	33–1	Cisse Salif	UD	8	Dec 13, 2008	Morongo Casino Resort & Spa, Cabazon, California, U.S.	
33	Win	32–1	Livin Castillo	TKO	5 (10), 2:59	Oct 3, 2008	The Blue Horizon, Philadelphia, Pennsylvania, U.S.	
32	Win	31–1	Raphael Butler	TKO	6 (12)	Jun 20, 2008	Royal Watler Cruise Terminal, George Town, Cayman Islands	Retained USBA heavyweight title
31	Loss	30–1	Alexander Povetkin	UD	12	Jan 26, 2008	Tempodrom, Berlin, Germany	
30	Win	30–0	Calvin Brock	SD	12	Nov 2, 2007	Emerald Queen Casino, Tacoma, Washington, U.S.	
29	Win	29–0	Dominick Guinn	UD	10	May 4, 2007	Pearl Concert Theater, Paradise, Nevada, U.S.	
28	Win	28–0	Derric Rossy	TKO	7 (12), 2:32	Feb 9, 2007	Suffolk County Community College, Brookhaven, New York, U.S.	Won vacant USBA heavyweight title
27	Win	27–0	Domonic Jenkins	TKO	5 (8), 2:17	Aug 19, 2006	Events Center, Reno, Nevada, U.S.	
26	Win	26–0	Ed Mahone	TKO	4 (10), 0:33	Jun 2, 2006	The Blue Horizon, Philadelphia, Pennsylvania, U.S.	
25	Win	25–0	Andrew Greeley	UD	8	Feb 10, 2006	The Blue Horizon, Philadelphia, Pennsylvania, U.S.	
24	Win	24–0	Robert Hawkins	UD	12	Sep 9, 2005	The Blue Horizon, Philadelphia, Pennsylvania, U.S.	Won IBU and vacant Pennsylvania State heavyweight titles
23	Win	23–0	Ross Puritty	UD	10	May 17, 2005	The Blue Horizon, Philadelphia, Pennsylvania, U.S.	
22	Win	22–0	Melvin Foster	TKO	5 (10)	Apr 22, 2005	The Blue Horizon, Philadelphia, Pennsylvania, U.S.	
21	Win	21–0	Louis Monaco	UD	10	Dec 3, 2004	The Blue Horizon, Philadelphia, Pennsylvania, U.S.	
20	Win	20–0	Ron Guerrero	UD	10	Oct 8, 2004	The Blue Horizon, Philadelphia, Pennsylvania, U.S.	
19	Win	19–0	John Sargent	TKO	1 (8), 2:46	Jun 25, 2004	The Blue Horizon, Philadelphia, Pennsylvania, U.S.	
18	Win	18–0	Marcus Rhode	TKO	2 (6)	Apr 23, 2004	The Blue Horizon, Philadelphia, Pennsylvania, U.S.	
17	Win	17–0	Cornelius Ellis	MD	8	Feb 27, 2004	The Blue Horizon, Philadelphia, Pennsylvania, U.S.	
16	Win	16–0	Sam Tillman	TKO	3 (8)	Dec 5, 2003	The Blue Horizon, Philadelphia, Pennsylvania, U.S.	
15	Win	15–0	Allen Smith	KO	2 (6)	Aug 15, 2003	The Blue Horizon, Philadelphia, Pennsylvania, U.S.	
14	Win	14–0	Craig Tomlinson	TKO	4 (8)	Apr 25, 2003	The Blue Horizon, Philadelphia, Pennsylvania, U.S.	
13	Win	13–0	Kevin Tallon	TKO	1 (6)	Feb 21, 2003	The Blue Horizon, Philadelphia, Pennsylvania, U.S.	
12	Win	12–0	Dean Storey	UD	6	Dec 6, 2002	The Blue Horizon, Philadelphia, Pennsylvania, U.S.	
11	Win	11–0	Antonio Colbert	TKO	5	Sep 20, 2002	The Blue Horizon, Philadelphia, Pennsylvania, U.S.	
10	Win	10–0	David Chappell	UD	6	May 24, 2002	The Blue Horizon, Philadelphia, Pennsylvania, U.S.	
9	Win	9–0	David Chappell	UD	8	Apr 26, 2002	Coliseum, Pittsburgh, Pennsylvania, U.S.	
8	Win	8–0	Mark Johnson	TKO	4 (4), 1:30	Oct 27, 2001	St. John Arena, Steubenville, Ohio, U.S.	
7	Win	7–0	Carlos Igo	UD	6	Aug 25, 2001	Pepsi-Cola Roadhouse, Burgettstown, Pennsylvania, U.S.	
6	Win	6–0	Joe Lenhart	PTS	6	Aug 3, 2001	Pittsburgh, Pennsylvania, U.S.	
5	Win	5–0	Anthony Prince	KO	1 (4), 0:57	Jun 23, 2001	Burgettstown, Pennsylvania, U.S.	
4	Win	4–0	Joe Lenhart	UD	6	Apr 20, 2001	Burgettstown, Pennsylvania, U.S.	
3	Win	3–0	Scott Hosaflook	TKO	3 (6)	Apr 7, 2001	Pittsburgh, Pennsylvania, U.S.	
2	Win	2–0	Ed Barry	KO	1	Mar 3, 2001	Burgettstown, Pennsylvania, U.S.	
1	Win	1–0	Tyrone Austin	TKO	2	Dec 29, 2000	Mountaineer Casino Racetrack and Resort, Chester, West Virginia, U.S.	

== Viewership ==
=== United States ===
Date	Fight	Viewership (avg.)	Network	Source(s)
26 January 2008	Eddie Chambers vs. Alexander Povetkin	1,500,000	HBO	
	Total viewership	1,500,000	HBO	

=== Germany ===
Date	Fight	Viewership (avg.)	Network	Source
January 26, 2008	Eddie Chambers vs. Alexander Povetkin	4,880,000	Das Erste	
July 4, 2009	Eddie Chambers vs. Alexander Dimitrenko	4,940,000	ZDF	
March 20, 2010	Wladimir Klitschko vs. Eddie Chambers	12,590,000	RTL Television	
	Total viewership	22,410,000		

Sporting positions
Regional boxing titles
Vacant Title last held by Bert Cooper	Pennsylvania heavyweight champion September 9, 2005 – July 2008; Vacated	Vacant Title next held by Brian Minto
Vacant Title last held by Evander Holyfield	USBA heavyweight champion February 9, 2007 – August 2008; Vacated	Vacant Title next held by Cedric Boswell
Minor world boxing titles
Preceded by Robert Hawkins	IBU heavyweight champion September 9, 2007 – May 2006; Vacated	Vacant Title next held by Gene Pukall
