= Julius Long =

American boxer

Julius Lloyd-Long
Personal information
- Nickname: Towering Inferno
- Nationality: New Zealander; American
- Born: Julius Long; 28 May 1977 (age 49) Romulus, Michigan, U.S.
- Height: 216 cm (7 ft 1 in)
- Weight: Heavyweight

Boxing career
- Reach: 229 cm (90 in)
- Stance: Orthodox

Boxing record
- Total fights: 50
- Wins: 18
- Win by KO: 14
- Losses: 30
- Draws: 1
- No contests: 1

Julius Lloyd-Long (born 28 May 1977) is an American-born New Zealander professional boxer. He is best known for his physical stature, standing at 7 ft 1 in (2.16 m) and having a purportedly record-breaking 90 in (230 cm) reach.

== Personal life ==
He resides in Auckland. He is married to his wife Rebecca Lloyd Long. Outside of the ring, Long is a professional chef.

== Professional career ==
Julius Long turned professional on January 17, 2001 at the age of 23 years. He won his first contest by first round stoppage. He has been a journeyman throughout his career, and has fought notable opponents such as former WBC heavyweight champion Samuel Peter, Olympic gold medalists; Audley Harrison and Odlanier Solis, as well as several heavyweight title contenders. In 2013, Duco Events flew Long to New Zealand to help train David Tua in his bout against Alexander Ustinov. Long decided to move to New Zealand permanently.

== Professional boxing titles ==
- World Boxing Association
  - Interim WBA Oceania Heavyweight title (283¼ lbs)

== Professional boxing record ==
50 fights	18 wins	30 losses
By knockout	14	13
By decision	4	17
Draws	1	
No contests	1	

No.	Result	Record	Opponent	Type	Round, time	Date	Location	Notes
50	Loss	18–30–1; 1 NC	(Australia) Alex Leapai Jnr	TKO	1 (8), 1:15	30 May 2026	Shire Hall, Gatton, Queensland, Australia	
49	Loss	18–29–1; 1 NC	(New Zealand) Uila Mau'u	TKO	3 (4)	6 Dec 2025	Orewa Arts and Events Centre, Orewa, New Zealand	
48	Loss	18–28–1; 1 NC	(New Zealand) Uila Mau'u	KO	3 (6)	15 Jun 2024	Synergy community trust, New Lynn, New Zealand	
47	Loss	18–27–1; 1 NC	(Australia) Toese Vousiutu	TKO	4 (4), 0:27	15 Oct 2023	Gold Coast Convention Centre, Broadbeach, Queensland, Australia	
46	Loss	18–26–1; 1 NC	(New Zealand) Kiki Toa Leutele	UD	10	12 May 2023	Sri Radha Krishna Mandir, Auckland, New Zealand	
45	Loss	18–25–1; 1 NC	(New Zealand) Hemi Ahio	KO	7 (8), 2:55	27 Feb 2021	Spark Arena, Auckland, New Zealand	
44	Draw	18–24–1; 1 NC	(New Zealand) Kiki Toa Leutele	PTS	6	30 Aug 2019	North Shore Events Centre, Auckland, New Zealand	
43	Loss	18–24; 1 NC	(Australia) Faiga Opelu	UD	5	26 July 2019	GC Boxing Events Centre, West Burleigh, Queensland, Australia	
42	Loss	18–23; 1 NC	(Australia) Patrick Eneanya	UD	3	14 June 2019	The Melbourne Pavilion, Flemington, Victoria, Australia	Semi Final 2 of the 4 man tournament
41	Loss	18–22; 1 NC	(New Zealand) Hemi Ahio	UD	6	30 March 2019	Sky City Convention Centre, Auckland, New Zealand	
40	Loss	18–21; 1 NC	(Australia) Lucas Browne	KO	3 (8)	28 September 2018	Convention Centre, Gold Coast, Queensland, Australia	
39	Win	18–20; 1 NC	(Australia) Bowie Tupou	SD	10	7 October 2016	Jupiters Hotel & Casino, Gold Coast, Queensland, Australia	Won interim WBA Oceania heavyweight title
38	Loss	17–20; 1 NC	(Australia) Peter Graham	TD—U	6 (12) 2:02	27 February 2016	Convention Centre, Darwin, Northern Territory, Australia	For vacant WBF heavyweight title
37	Win	17–19; 1 NC	(Australia) Justin Whitehead	UD	6	21 November 2015	Bendigo Stadium, Bendigo, Victoria, Australia	
36	Loss	16–19; 1 NC	(Australia) Lucas Browne	KO	9 (10) 2:59	14 August 2015	The Melbourne Pavilion, Flemington, Victoria, Australia	
35	Loss	16–18; 1 NC	(Poland) Izuagbe Ugonoh	UD	8	13 June 2015	Arena Manawatu, Palmerston North, New Zealand	
34	Win	16–17; 1 NC	(New Zealand) Jason Williams	TKO	4 (6)	10 October 2013	The Trusts Arena, Auckland, New Zealand	
33	Loss	15–17; 1 NC	(United States) Jason Bergman	RTD	5 (6) 3:00	23 June 2012	(United States) Green Tree Complex, Pittsburgh, Pennsylvania, USA	
32	Loss	15–16; 1 NC	(United States) Johnathon Banks	UD	10	2 July 2011	(United States) Atwood Stadium, Flint, Michigan, USA	
31	Loss	15–15; 1 NC	(United States) Kevin Johnson	UD	8	22 January 2011	(United States) The Greenbrier, White Sulphur Springs, West Virginia, USA	
30	Loss	15–14; 1 NC	(United States) Maurice Harris	UD	6	26 March 2010	(United States) UIC Pavilion, Chicago, Illinois, USA	
29	Loss	15–13; 1 NC	(United States) Kelvin Price	UD	6	18 December 2009	(United States) Grand Casino, Hinckley, Minnesota, USA	
28	Loss	15–12; 1 NC	(Poland) Mariusz Wach	TKO	7 (10) 2:17	24 April 2009	MOSiR Hall, ul. Sikorskiego 5, Jarosław, Poland	
27	Loss	15–11; 1 NC	(United States) Ray Austin	UD	8	14 February 2009	(United States) BankAtlantic Center, Sunrise, Florida, USA	
26	Loss	15–10; 1 NC	(Russia) Alexander Ustinov	KO	1 (8) 2:50	11 Oct 2008	O2 World Arena, Berlin, Germany	
25	Loss	15–9; 1 NC	(Cuba) Odlanier Solis	UD	8	23 December 2007	Maritim Hotel, Halle an der Saale, Sachsen-Anhalt, Germany	For vacant WBC Latino heavyweight title
24	Win	15–8; 1 NC	(United States) Eli Dixon	RTD	5 (6) 3:00	29 June 2007	(United States) Fifth Third Ballpark, Comstock Park, Michigan, USA	
23	ND	14–8; 1 NC	(United States) Vinny Maddalone	TD—U	5 (8) 3:00	15 December 2006	(United States) Merchant Marine Academy, Kings Point, New York, USA	Originally a unanimous TD for Long due to an accidental headbutt, later overturned after he failed a drugs test
22	Loss	14–8	(Nigeria) Samuel Peter	KO	1 (12) 2:35	28 April 2006	(United States) Mohegan Sun Casino, Uncasville, Connecticut, USA	For vacant NABF heavyweight title
21	Loss	14–7	(United States) Terry Smith	UD	10	2 September 2005	(United States) Statehouse Convention Center, Little Rock, Arkansas USA	
20	Win	14–6	(United States) Ramon Hayes	UD	6	20 April 2005	(United States) Andiamo's, Warren, Michigan, USA	
19	Loss	13–6	(Nigeria) Raymond Olubowale	MD	4	10 March 2005	Mississauga Grand, Mississauga, Ontario, Canada	
18	Win	13–5	(United States) Derrell Banks	TKO	2 (6) 2:59	18 February 2005	(United States) State Fair Grounds, Detroit, Michigan, USA	
17	Win	12–5	(United States) Derrell Banks	UD	4	21 August 2004	(United States) 30 North, Pontiac, Michigan, USA	
16	Win	11–5	(Russia) Nikolay Popov	TKO	6 (10) 0:26	8 June 2004	(United States) Seminole Hard Rock Hotel and Casino, Hollywood, Florida, USA	
15	Loss	10–5	(United States) Derrick Jefferson	TD—	8 (8)	27 February 2004	(United States) Blue Horizon, Philadelphia, Pennsylvania, USA	
14	Loss	10–4	(United States) Tye Fields	KO	3 (12) 1:11	5 December 2003	(United States) Polk County Convention Center, Des Moines, Iowa, USA	For vacant WBE Continental Americas super heavyweight title
13	Loss	10–3	(United States) Rob Calloway	UD	12	18 October 2003	(United States) Civic Arena, St. Joseph, Missouri, USA	For WBF Intercontinental heavyweight title
12	Win	10–2	(United States) Karriem Respress	KO	1 (6) 1:08	12 April 2003	(United States) Headliners, Toledo, Ohio, USA	
11	Win	9–2	(United States) Fred Dennis	KO	1 (4) 1:11	14 December 2002	(United States) Cambridge Place, Toledo, Ohio, USA	
10	Win	8–2	(United States) Paul Nutall	TKO	2 (4) 0:38	5 October 2002	(United States) Cobo Hall, Detroit, Michigan, USA	
9	Win	7–2	(United States) Phillip Welch	TKO	2 (4) 0:38	2 August 2002	(United States) Cobo Hall, Detroit, Michigan, USA	
8	Loss	6–2	(United Kingdom) Audley Harrison	KO	2 (6) 2:00	20 April 2002	Conference Centre, Wembley, London, England, United Kingdom	
7	Win	6–1	(United States) Karriem Respress	KO	1 (4) 1:00	26 January 2002	(United States) Club International, Detroit, Michigan, USA	
6	Loss	5–1	(United States) Leo Nolan	UD	6	9 November 2001	(United States) Club International, Detroit, Michigan, USA	
5	Win	5–0	(United States) Karriem Respress	TKO	1 (4) 1:16	10 August 2001	(United States) Cobo Hall, Detroit, Michigan, USA	
4	Win	4–0	(United States) Tony Rice	KO	2 (4)	22 June 2001	Hershey Centre, Mississauga, Ontario, Canada	
3	Win	3–0	(United States) Paul Nutall	TKO	1 (4)	13 April 2001	(United States) Cobo Hall, Detroit, Michigan, USA	
2	Win	2–0	(United States) Ray Bailey	TKO	1 (4)	29 March 2001	(United States) La Globe, Lansing, Michigan, USA	
1	Win	1–0	(United States) Malcolm Bond	TKO	1 (4), 1:55	17 January 2001	(United States) Andiamo's Banquet Center, Warren, Michigan, USA	

== Awards and recognitions ==
- 2019 Gladrap Boxing Awards New Zealand fight of the year (Nominated)
- 2019 Gladrap Boxing Awards Most Entertaining Boxer of the year (Nominated)
