= Power Uti =

Nigerian professional wrestler (born c.1962)

Personal information
- Born: John Eke Uti c. 1962 (age 63–64) Nigeria
- Family: Samuel Peter

Professional wrestling career
- Ring name: Power Uti
- Billed height: 5 ft 9 in (1.75 m)
- Billed weight: 220 lb (100 kg)
- Debut: 1976

John Eke Uti (born c. 1962), better known by the ring name Power Uti, is a Nigerian retired professional wrestler.

Uti is the uncle of professional boxer Samuel Peter.

== Career ==
Born c. 1962, Uti was active in Nigeria during the 1970s to the 2010s, having local matches against American wrestlers including, Mr. Fuji, Luiz Martinez and Luke Gallows.

In 1986, Uti was involved in a riot after losing to Mick Foley in Lagos, Nigeria. Afterwards, Foley was reportedly "stitched up on a dirt floor with sewing thread and sent home". Years later, Foley criticized the Nigerian champion in Have a Nice Day: A Tale of Blood and Sweatsocks (1999) which included calling him "as rude and untalented as he was muscular".

== 2017 arrest ==
On October 2017, Uti was arrested in Lagos for the alleged murder of his wife, Toyin.

== Championships and accomplishments ==
- Continental Wrestling Alliance / Nigeria Wrestling Federation
  - CWA/NWF Junior Heavyweight Championship (1 time)
