= Melvin Foster =

American boxer

Melvin Foster (born February 23, 1971, in Washington, DC) is an American former heavyweight boxer best known for his amateur boxing career. He most notably defeated former world champion Mike Weaver and two-time title challenger Carl Williams.

== Professional career ==
Known as "Top Gun", Foster turned pro in 1992 and remained undefeated until losing to Trevor Berbick in 1994. The following year he dropped a decision to Michael Moorer, and after the loss his once promising career began to sour, and he morphed into a journeyman fighter. He went on to lose bouts to Jimmy Thunder, Corey Sanders, Hasim Rahman, Derrick Jefferson, and Cedric Boswell. He retired in 2005 after a TKO loss to Eddie Chambers.

== Professional boxing record ==
24 wins (18 knockouts, 6 decisions), 13 losses (8 knockouts, 5 decisions), 1 draw
Result	Record	Opponent	Type	Round	Date	Location	Notes
Loss	24-13-1	(United States) Eddie Chambers	TKO	5	22/04/2005	(United States) Philadelphia, Pennsylvania, U.S.	
Win	24-12-1	(United States) Willie Perryman	KO	3	05/02/2005	(United States) Washington, D.C., U.S.	
Loss	23-12-1	(United States) Cedric Boswell	UD	8	22/09/2002	(United States) Friant, California, U.S.	
Loss	23-11-1	(United States) Danell Nicholson	TKO	4	18/01/2002	(United States) Las Vegas, Nevada, U.S.	Referee stopped the bout at 2:36 of the fourth round.
Loss	23-10-1	(United States) Faruq Saleem	SD	10	08/12/2001	(United States) Wilmington, Delaware, U.S.	
Loss	23-9-1	(United States) Derrick Jefferson	TKO	4	10/09/1999	(United States) Mount Pleasant, Michigan, U.S.	Referee stopped the bout at 2:05 of the fourth round.
Loss	23-8-1	(United States) Garing Lane	UD	8	30/07/1999	(United States) Biloxi, Mississippi, U.S.	
Win	23-7-1	(United States) Jade Scott	UD	10	18/12/1998	(United States) Fort Lauderdale, Florida, U.S.	
Win	22-7-1	(United States) Mike Weaver	TKO	9	08/08/1998	(United States) Spirit Lake, North Dakota, U.S.	
Loss	21-7-1	(United States) Hasim Rahman	TKO	2	14/03/1998	Moscow, Russia	
Loss	21-6-1	(United States) Corey Sanders	TKO	6	09/01/1998	(United States) Atlantic City, New Jersey, U.S.	
Loss	21-5-1	(United States) Robert Hawkins	TKO	10	20/05/1997	(United States) Lyndhurst, New Jersey, U.S.	
Loss	21-4-1	(United States) Jeff Wooden	TKO	7	15/10/1996	(United States) Atlantic City, New Jersey, U.S.	
Win	21-3-1	(United States) David Smith	TKO	2	26/04/1996	(United States) Westbury, New York, U.S.	
Loss	20-3-1	(New Zealand) Jimmy Thunder	TKO	8	03/10/1995	(United States) Mashantucket, Connecticut, U.S.	Referee stopped the bout at 1:03 of the eighth round.
Win	20-2-1	(United States) Carlton West	TKO	2	30/08/1995	(United States) Washington, D.C., U.S.	
Loss	19-2-1	(United States) Michael Moorer	UD	10	13/05/1995	(United States) Sacramento, California, U.S.	
Win	19-1-1	(United States) Mike Dixon	TKO	8	28/04/1995	(United States) Westbury, New York, U.S.	
Win	18-1-1	(United States) Carl Williams	PTS	10	17/03/1995	(United States) Bushkill, Pennsylvania, U.S.	
Win	17-1-1	(United States) Ron Gullette	KO	3	11/01/1995	Woodlawn, Maryland, U.S.	
Win	16-1-1	(United States) Jimmy Harrison	KO	6	22/10/1994	(United States) Washington, D.C., U.S.	
Loss	15-1-1	(Canada) Trevor Berbick	SD	10	13/09/1994	(United States) Westbury, New York, U.S.	
Win	15-0-1	(United States) Mitch Green	PTS	10	02/06/1994	(United States) Melville, New York, U.S.	New York Heavyweight Title.
Win	14-0-1	(United States) Bruce Johnson	TKO	2	23/04/1994	(United States) Washington, D.C., U.S.	
Win	13-0-1	(United States) Martin Foster	UD	10	22/03/1994	(United States) Pensacola, Florida, U.S.	
Win	12-0-1	(United States) Mike Whitfield	UD	8	17/02/1994	(United States) Upper Marlboro, Maryland, U.S.	
Draw	11-0-1	(United States) Martin Foster	PTS	8	28/01/1994	(United States) Kingston, New York, U.S.	
Win	11-0	(United States) Ron Gullette	TKO	2	12/10/1993	(United States) Virginia Beach, Virginia, U.S.	
Win	10-0	(United States) George Harris	KO	2	25/09/1993	(United States) Erie, Pennsylvania, U.S.	
Win	9-0	(Cuba) Lazaro Almanza	TKO	3	16/07/1993	(United States) Melville, New York, U.S.	
Win	8-0	(United States) Gary Poole	TKO	2	02/07/1993	(United States) Washington, D.C., U.S.	
Win	7-0	(United States) Webster Vinson	TKO	2	18/06/1993	(United States) White Plains, New York, U.S.	
Win	6-0	(United States) Eugene Adams	TKO	3	21/05/1993	(United States) Uniondale, New York, U.S.	
Win	5-0	Ed McCarroll	KO	1	26/03/1993	(United States) Erie, Pennsylvania, U.S.	
Win	4-0	Frank July	KO	1	19/02/1993	(United States) Washington, D.C., U.S.	July knocked out at 0:42 of the first round.
Win	3-0	(United States) Charles Brooks	KO	1	09/12/1992	(United States) Virginia Beach, Virginia, U.S.	
Win	2-0	(United States) Don Johnson	KO	1	29/11/1992	(United States) Washington, D.C., U.S.	
Win	1-0	(United States) Nelson Garcia	PTS	4	23/10/1992	(United States) Hauppauge, New York, U.S.	

== Amateur career ==
- Ohio State Fair runner-up to "Iceman" John Scully, 165 pounds (1987)
- National Golden Gloves Heavyweight Champion (1991)
