= Oleg Maskaev vs. Samuel Peter =

Boxing event

Championship Heat
- Date: 8 March 2008
- Venue: Plaza de Toros México, Cancún, Quintana Roo, Mexico
- Title on the line: WBC Heavyweight Championship

Tale of the tape
Boxer	(Russia) Oleg Maskaev	(Nigeria) Samuel Peter
Nickname	"The Big O"	"The Nigerian Nightmare"
Hometown	Abay, Karaganda, Kazakhstan	Akwa Ibom, Nigeria
Pre-fight record	34–5 (26 KO)	29–1 (22 KO)
Age	39 years, 6 months	27 years, 6 months
Height	6 ft 3 in (191 cm)	6 ft 2 in (188 cm)
Weight	243 lb (110 kg)	250 3/4 lb (114 kg)
Style	Orthodox	Orthodox
Recognition	WBC; Heavyweight Champion; The Ring; No. 4 Ranked Heavyweight	WBC; No. 1 Ranked Heavyweight; The Ring; No. 2 Ranked Heavyweight

Result
- Peter defeated Maskaev via 6th Round TKO

Oleg Maskaev vs. Samuel Peter, billed as Championship Heat, was a professional boxing match contested on 8 March 2008, for the WBC heavyweight championship.

== Background ==
Following his knockout victory over Hasim Rahman to win WBC Heavyweight Championship, Oleg Maskaev made one defence in December 2006 against the unknown Okello Peter in Moscow, before entering into negotiations with the WBC Emeritus champion Vitali Klitschko, who had publicly announced that he intended to return to boxing three years since his last bout with Danny Williams. Dino Duva, the promoter of Samuel Peter who had been the mandatory challenger for the WBC belt ever since his first victory over James Toney in September 2006, urged Maskaev's promoter Dennis Rappaport to start negotiations over a mandatory defense with Peter. Saying "José Sulaimán and the WBC have made it clear that they are honoring their commitment for Maskaev to defend his title against Samuel Peter immediately. We respect Oleg, know that he is a true champion, and expect him to honor that commitment."

Peter was offered between $2.5 and $3 million to step aside, under agreement that the winner of a Maskaev-Klitschko fight would face him next. Eventually, negotiations between Klitschko and Maskaev broke down when Klitschko's team refused additional demands from both Maskaev's and Peter's teams: Maskaev wanted a purse of $5 million instead of the offered $3 million, while Peter was also not satisfied with his offer. On April 5, the teams of all three boxers agreed to give a green light to the Maskaev-Peter fight, under agreement that Vitali would be the first in line to face the winner. On April 9, WBC gave Maskaev and Peter time until April 20 to sign a contract, after which a purse offer would be held.

All sides reached agreement and the contract was signed on July 26, for Maskaev to face Peter on October 6 at Madison Square Garden, while Klitschko signed to face Jameel McCline on 22 September in a tune-up bout, however on 21 September, Maskaev was forced to pull out of the fight due to a herniated disc. As a result, Peter would face McCline, whose bout with Klitschko had been cancelled following a back injury for Vitali.

McCline would drop Peter three times (the first time he had ever been dropped), however Peter would escape with a unanimous decision.

The bout with Maskaev was rearranged for March 2008 and would be the first heavyweight bout in Mexico since Bob Fitzsimmons vs. Peter Maher in 1896. The referee Jose Guadalupe Garcia had been the third man in the ring when Oliver McCall stuned Lennox Lewis in their WBC heavyweight title clash in 1994.

== The fight ==
Peter wobbled Maskaev badly with uppercut in the third round, although the champion was able to block almost all of Peter's follow up punches and later in the round he hurt the challenger with a right cross. In the sixth a right hand from Peter landed flush and had Maskaev in trouble. Maskaev was backed up into the ropes and Peter followed up with a series of hard punches that dropped the champion prompting the referee to wave it off.

== Aftermath ==
Peter's victory made him the first Nigerian to win a heavyweight championship belt. The victory would later be ranked as the 26th most memorable moments in Nigeria's sporting history since independence by Premium Times in 2020. It was second among combat sports-related moments, only behind Dick Tiger becoming the first Nigerian to win a world boxing title in 1962.

After extended negotiations it was agreed that Peter would face Klitschko on 11 October in Berlin.

== Undercard ==
Confirmed bouts:

== Broadcasting ==
Country	Broadcaster
Australia	Main Event
Mexico	Televisa
Russia	REN-TV
Ukraine	1+1
United States	HBO

Preceded by vs. Okello Peter	Oleg Maskaev's bouts 8 March 2008	Succeeded by vs. Robert Hawkins
Preceded by vs. Jameel McCline	Samuel Peter's bouts 8 March 2008	Succeeded by vs. Vitali Klitschko
