= Samuel Peter =

Nigerian boxer (born 1980)

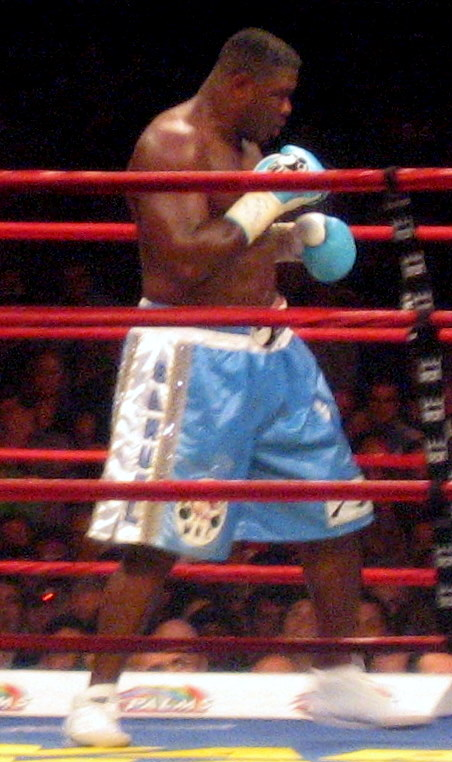
- Samuel Peter in 2007

Personal information
- Nickname: The Nigerian Nightmare
- Nationality: Nigerian; American
- Born: Samuel Okon Peter; September 6, 1980 (age 46) Akwa Ibom, Nigeria
- Height: 1.88 m (6 ft 2 in)
- Weight: Heavyweight

Boxing career
- Reach: 196 cm (77 in)
- Stance: Orthodox

Boxing record
- Total fights: 47
- Wins: 38
- Win by KO: 31
- Losses: 9

Samuel Okon Peter (born September 6, 1980) is a Nigerian former professional boxer who competed from 2001 to 2019. He held the World Boxing Council (WBC) heavyweight title in 2008. At regional level, he held multiple heavyweight championships, including the NABF title twice between 2004 and 2007; and the USBA title in 2005.

Peter was named among the 20 greatest athletes in the history of independent Nigeria by The Punch in 2023, while his capturing of the WBC heavyweight title was ranked the 26th most memorable moment in independent Nigeria's sports history by Premium Times in 2020. He was ranked by The Ring among ten best heavyweights at the conclusion of a year from 2005 to 2008, reaching his highest ranking of world No.2 in 2007. Peter is known for his punching power and holds a 78.9% knockout-to-win ratio.

== Early life and amateur career ==
Originally, Peter's preferred sport was football. In 1992, some boxers came to his school to train. The curious young 11-year-old stopped by and asked if he could train along with them. He was put up against an experienced amateur and knocked him out. This marked the beginning of a successful amateur career for Peter.

He won the Nigerian Amateur Heavyweight Championship and the Africa Zone 3 Heavyweight Championship. He faced stiff competition as an amateur (including a knockout victory over 2000 silver medalist Mukhtarkhan Dildabekov of Kazakhstan). However, he prevailed and was given the opportunity to represent Nigeria at the 2000 Summer Olympics in Sydney, Australia.

Peter lost in the quarterfinals to Italian Paolo Vidoz by decision. However, his performance was noted for being very impressive from such a young pugilist and hence more excitement was generated for him than the eventual gold medalist, Audley Harrison, to whom Peter had lost a very close decision just a few months before the Olympics.

== Professional career ==
=== Early career ===
"I was surprised when he ran the 100 meters in less than 11 seconds, I immediately realized how athletically gifted Samuel was. He could have competed in track and field on the world stage. If he had been born in the United States, I'm sure he could have been successful on team sports here."

— Ivaylo Gotzev, talking about Peter's brief stint at Lennox Lewis' gym in London

Immediately after the Olympics, Ivaylo Gotzev signed on as Peter's manager, and Andy "Pops" Anderson became his coach. Peter made his professional debut on February 6, 2001, against Bulgarian fighter Georgi Hristov in Almaty, Kazakhstan. Peter won the bout by first-round knockout. He had seven fights in 2001, winning all of them but one in the first-round. Peter's impressive performance in his early fights landed him a promotional deal with Dino Duva of Duva Boxing. Peter made a step up in competition the following year, as his first fight of the year was against Marion Wilson. The bout was scheduled for four rounds. With 11–37–3 record, Wilson was known for his durability and toughness, having never lost inside the distance and occasionally pulling upsets, such as wins over Corey Sanders and Paea Wolfgramm or split draw against Ray Mercer. Peter won the bout by unanimous decision.

Peter had his next fight 19 days later against Julius Joiner (2–0–1, 1 KOs). This was Peter's first televised fight, as it was aired on ESPN2. The bout was on the undercard of the event that had James Toney facing Sione Asipeli and Lamont Pearson facing Orlando Salido. Joiner did not come out for the second round, prompting the referee to declare Peter the winner by corner retirement. Peter had three more fights in 2002, winning each by second-round stoppage and having the former two televised by ESPN2.

Afterwards Peter did not enter the ring for 8 months before facing Dale Crowe for the WBC's Youth heavyweight title. 26-year old Crowe had a 24–6–2 (15 KOs) record coming into the fight and had only been stopped by DaVarryl Williamson. Crowe became notorious after the fight against former world heavyweight champion Greg Page, in which he pushed Page against the ropes, which resulted in Page ending up partially paralyzed. This was the first professional fight in Peter's career scheduled for 10 rounds. The event was aired on ESPN2. Peter won every round on all scorecards before stopping Crowe in the fourth round.

Peter returned to the ring three months later, facing Lyle McDowell (27–9–1, 18 KOs) on June 21, 2003, in a fight televised by HBO as part of the card that saw Lennox Lewis facing Vitali Klitschko in the main event. Peter stopped McDowell in the fourth round. Peter finished the year with two second-round stoppages, boosting his record to 16 wins in 16 fights, with 15 of them inside the distance. He signed to fight Lawrence Clay-Bey (18–2, 13 KOs) in December in a bout televised by ESPN, however Clay-Bey pulled out of the fight due to injury. Dino Duva accused Clay-Bey of faking an injury to avoid fighting Samuel Peter.

=== Rising through rankings ===
==== Peter vs. Shufford, Pudar ====
After scoring two back-to-back stoppage wins against Chris Isaac and Jose Arimatea da Silva, with the former being the first time Peter went past fifth round, Peter had 18 wins in his professional record, for which he needed 41 rounds. He then took a big step up in competition when he faced former WBO world heavyweight title challenger Charles Shufford on May 17, 2004. This was the first time Peter was in the main event of a card. Both Peter and his manager Ivaylo Gotzev praised Shufford for accepting the fight in contrast to other heavyweights that turned down the offer, as Peter already gained a reputation of a powerful and aggressive fighter. The event was the third installment of Heavyweight Heroes: the Search for the Next Great Heavyweight, a monthly PPV boxing series created by Cedric Kushner Promotions and broadcast on In Demand for $19.95. Shufford had a record of 20–5, 9 KOs coming into the bout and was 3–3 in his last six fights. Peter won the bout by unanimous decision, going ten rounds for the first time in his career. Three judges scored the bout 99–91, 98–92 and 97–93. According to CompuBox, Peter landed more total and power punches than Shufford in every round; overall, Peter threw 569 shots (32.2% accuracy), with 277 of them being power punches (46.2% accuracy).

Three months later, Peter faced Serbian heavyweight Jovo Pudar on 5 August 2004 at Seminole Hard Rock Hotel & Casino in Hollywood, Florida. 33-year old Jovo Pudar had a record of 22–2 (12 KOs) coming into the bout and had never been stopped in his professional boxing career. He was 5–1 in his last six fights, with the only loss coming at the hands of Taurus Sykes. The fight was televised by Showtime as part of the ShoBox: The New Generation boxing program. In the build-up to the fight, Ivaylo Gotzev claimed that this fight would finally establish Peter as "the next true heavyweight king in the minds of boxing fans": "enough about Dominick Guinn and Joe Mesi and all the rest of them; tune in August 5. I guarantee Samuel Peter will be explosive!" He also expressed his interest in Lawrence Clay-Bey, who was coming off of a fifth-round TKO win over former IBF world cruiserweight champion Imamu Mayfield, as Peter's next opponent.

Although Peter was unable to stop Pudar, he bloodied his nose, eventually winning a unanimous decision. Three judges scored the bout 100–90 (twice) and 98–92. According to CompuBox, there were 1,281 punches thrown between two fighters. Peter connected on 239 shots out of 690, while Pudar landed 162 punches out of 591. Peter outlanded his opponent in each round but third and ninth (even) and connected on more power shots in all of the ten rounds.

==== Peter vs. Williams, Diaz ====
To conclude 2004, Peter agreed to face former WBO world heavyweight title challenger Jeremy Williams (41–4–1, 35 KOs) on December 4, 2004, at Mandalay Bay Resort & Casino in Las Vegas, Nevada. With a record of 6–0–1, 4 KOs in his last seven fights, Williams was seen to have put his losses to Henry Akinwande and Brian Nielsen behind him, scoring back-to-back upset victories against rising prospects Andre Purlette (35–1, 32 KOs) and Attila Levin (29–1, 23 KOs) and drawing against former IBF world cruiserweight champion Al Cole. The bout took place on the undercard of Jose Luis Castillo vs. Joel Casamayor and was aired on Showtime.

Both boxers started the fight aggressively. After back-and-forth trading in the opening seconds, Williams retreated onto the outside, at first attempting to bob-and-weave but then changing his tactics to circling around Peter and working behind the jab after the bob-and-weave strategy didn't work. Meanwhile, Peter was stalking his opponent across the ring, fighting his way inside and putting heavy pressure on Williams' body whenever Williams was at mid-range. With 20 seconds into the second round, Peter threw a one-two combination; as Williams ducked under Peter's right hand, Peter turned around and landed a left hook while Williams was square-footed and moving out of the mid-range. Williams was out cold for several minutes. Peter was declared the winner by second-round knockout, winning the vacant WBC-NABF heavyweight title. The win was nominated for the Knockout of the Year by ESPN. By December 2004, Peter was ranked No.9 contender by the WBC.

On January 22, 2005, Peter faced Cuban heavyweight Yanqui Díaz, who had a record 13–1, 8 KOs coming into the bout. This was the second time Peter was scheduled to fight in a twelve-round bout. Díaz was a highly regarded prospect due to his long and decorated amateur career, with boxing manager Wes Wolfe predicting he would become "a superstar among the Cubans". After an unexpected loss against Tony Thompson, Díaz went on a 5-fight winning streak, which included an upset first-round TKO against undefeated former long-reigning WBC world cruiserweight champion Juan Carlos Gomez and a split-decision victory over Vaughn Bean. He was ranked No.13 contender by the WBO by January 2005. The bout took place on the undercard of Floyd Mayweather Jr. vs. Henry Bruseles and was aired on HBO.

The fight saw Peter patiently stalking Díaz across the ring and finding his way inside while Díaz tried to stay on the outside, fight behind the jab and circle around his heavier opponent. In the first round, Peter sent Díaz down with a right hand. He did it again in the second but was deducted two points for intentionally hitting Díaz while he was down. In the fourth round, Peter pinned Díaz against the ropes and eventually knocked him down. Díaz got up but was sent to the canvas with a left hook to the body. Peter dropped Díaz for the fifth time in the following round, which prompted Díaz's corner to throw in the towel. By defeating Díaz, Peter won the vacant IBF-USBA heavyweight title. By April 2005, Peter was ranked No.5 contender by the WBC, No.6 by the WBO and No.9 by the IBF.

On April 29, 2005, he defeated a journeyman Gilbert Martinez (18–8–3, 7 KOs) by third-round TKO in a stay busy fight televised by ESPN2 as part of the Friday Night Fights series. By June, Peter was ranked No.9 heavyweight contender by The Ring. He was also ranked No.4 by the WBC and No.5 by both the IBF and WBO. Having a record of 23–0, 20 KOs, Peter was predicted to have a bright future in the heavyweight division, with media often comparing him to Mike Tyson due to his build and punching power. When interviewed by ESPN in 2005, Mike Tyson picked Peter and Calvin Brock as his favorite fighters from the new crop of heavyweights.

==== Peter vs. Sykes ====
On March 16, after a victory over another Nigerian heavyweight contender Friday Ahunanya, WBA-NABA heavyweight champion Taurus Sykes (23–1–1, 6 KOs) called out Peter and another heavyweight prospect Dominick Guinn and accused both of them of ducking a fight with him. Eventually the bout with Peter was scheduled to take place in Reno, Nevada, on July 2, 2005. This was the first time Peter headlined a card televised by Showtime. The event was part of the Showtime Championship Boxing program. Sykes was 5–0–1 in his last six fights, most notably defeating Ahunanya and scoring a draw against Imamu Mayfield. In the build-up to the fight, Sykes continued accusing Peter of avoiding the fight with him previously. A pre-fight press conference call saw a clash of words between both fighters, with Sykes continuing to insult Peter: "I know I am being underestimated, but it is all good. It has been like this my whole career. Everybody I have fought was supposed to beat me, but I came out on top. [...] I will outsmart him and outthink him. I am going to be a slick, crafty boxer. I know that he has never really fought anybody like that. Everybody he has fought is running from him, looking to get a check and leave. [...] Sam is getting all hyped. That is how I am going to take him out of the fight. I am going to bust him down and then I will just walk away with a smile."

During one of pre-fight interviews, Peter admitted he had never looked for an early knockout when he entered a fight, but expressed confidence in his ability of knocking out anyone "if I get my shots (off)". He also talked about the president and the government of Nigeria following his career and supporting him ever since his first appearance on Showtime, and stated that "for Nigeria, it would be unbelievable for us to have a world champion. Totally unbelievable."

The opening round saw Sykes attempting to stay away from Peter by circling around, working behind the jab and mostly throwing one-two combinations, while Peter was working his way inside, going back-and-forth between combinations to the head and body and trying to press Sykes against the ropes. The same pattern continued in the following round. In the middle of the second round, Peter hurt Sykes with a right hook as Sykes attempted to initiate a clinch. Peter immediately followed with a barrage of punches, not allowing Sykes to stay away and recover from the punch, ultimately knocking him down with one minute left. Sykes was not able to get up, prompting the referee to stop the fight and declare Peter the winner. With a win over Sykes, Peter became the holder of regional titles of three major sanctioning bodies – IBF, WBA and WBC. As of August 2005, Peter, already ranked by the WBC, IBF and WBO, was ranked No.9 by the WBA.

==== Peter vs. Wladimir Klitschko ====
On September 24, 2005, he faced Wladimir Klitschko in an elimination match in Atlantic City for the IBF title, in which Peter's WBC-NABF title was also on the line. Coming into the bout, Klitschko was viewed by many as the underdog against the 7-to-5 favorite Peter who had won all of his 24 fights, with 21 of them having ended inside the distance. Coming into the fight, Samuel Peter was considered one of the brightest prospects in the heavyweight division. Distinguished boxing coaches Angelo Dundee and Teddy Atlas expected Peter to win. Wladimir's team, including his brother Vitali, were worried about Wladimir, and were against this fight to happen. Wladimir, however, insisted on fighting Peter, claiming that beating a feared, hard-hitting fighter like Samuel Peter would help him to regain his stock and become mandatory challenger for two heavyweight belts.

The first four rounds were tentative, with Peter not being to close the distance. At the end of the third, Peter staggered Klitschko with a powerful left hook. He hurt Klitschko again in the fifth with another left hook, sending Klitschko to the canvas with the rabbit punch. The referee counted it as the knockdown. Peter immediately went for the attack after Klitschko got up, dropping him again with the rabbit punch. The referee scored it as the second knockdown. Peter was outboxed through sixth to ninth rounds, frequently trying to hit Klitschko with the rabbit punch whenever escaping from a clinch. Near the end of the tenth round Peter staggered Wladimir with a hard right hand, eventually sending Klitschko to the canvas with another right when Wladimir was backing away. In the 11th and 12th rounds, Klitschko was trying to keep Peter at the distance using straight punches. Peter caught Klitschko with a left hook in the last round, but was unable to capitalize on it. Instead, Klitschko caught him with a hard counter left hook of his own, staggering Peter for the first time in the fight.

Eventually the bout went the distance, with Peter losing the fight by unanimous decision (UD). All the judges scored the bout identically 114–111.

==== Peter vs. Hawkins, Long ====
Less than three months later after losing to Klitschko, on December 15, 2005, Peter faced Robert Hawkins (21–4–0, 7 KOs) in a stay-busy fight where the WBA-NABA title was also on the line. The bout was a part of the heavyweight triple-header which also saw undefeated Sultan Ibragimov facing Lance Whitaker, with Peter's promoter Ivaylo Gotzev expecting the winners of the two bouts to face each other in the near future. "Robert Hawkins is a tough and credible fighter", Dino Duva said in the build-up to the fight, "This fight proves Sam Peter is a true warrior not afraid of anyone." The event billed as "Global Warfare" took place at Seminole Hard Rock Hotel & Casino Hollywood and was televised on In-Demand PPV for $19.95.

The bout started with aggressive approach by Peter. He knocked Hawkins down midway through the first round but was more cautious afterwards, patiently stalking Hawkins across the ring and fighting behind the jab. The bout was interrupted in the fourth round after Sultan Ibragimov's coach Panama Lewis collapsed due to a heart failure. The delay lasted 11 minutes. After the action resumed, the following round only lasted one minute. After the sixth round, Peter was forced to fight with a split down the back of his trunks. Peter stepped up his aggression after the seventh round. Hawkins fought most of the fight on the back foot and appeared to be unable to withstand Peter's pressure. Ultimately the bout went the distance, with Peter being declared the winner. The judges scored the bout 99–90 (twice) and 98–91, all in favor of Peter. At the conclusion of 2005, Peter was ranked No.9 heavyweight in the world by The Ring.

On April 28, 2006, Peter faced 7'1" journeyman Julius Long (14–7, 12 KOs) for the NABF heavyweight title, despite the fact that Long was unranked by the WBC, in a bout televised by ESPN. Long was 4–2 in his last six fights, coming off of a UD loss to Terry Smith (24–1–1, 16 KOs). Peter was viewed as the heavy favorite against Long who, despite his size, was mostly an inside fighter and threw punches under unusual angles. Peter made a quick work of Long, dropping him 80 seconds into the first round and then again clobbering him by a three-punch combination, which resulted in Long collapsing face first on the canvas, prompting the referee to stop the fight.

=== WBC world heavyweight title contention ===
==== Peter vs. Toney I ====
Already in April 2005, Peter's promoter Dino Duva suggested that "Sam would wipe the floor with James Toney" and criticized major sanctioning bodies for "digging up dinosaurs to fight when they've got the most exciting new heavyweight to come along in many years and he's ready, willing and able to take over as soon as they give him the chance". James Toney's post-fight behavior following the victory (later overturned into a No Contest) over John Ruiz three days later to become WBA world heavyweight champion and a four-division world champion further angered Duva, who was also Ruiz's promoter: "Even though he beat him cleanly, James Toney showed he had no class by treating my friend and high class man John Ruiz like that after the fight. If he has balls, he'll go up against the top contender, Samuel Peter, but I doubt he has any. If he gets in the same ring as Samuel, I'll be glad to see Sam give him a bad quarter hour." Despite being stripped of the title due to a failed drug test and the win being nullified, Toney was still ranked No. 4 heavyweight in the world by The Ring as of March 2006, although some observers questioned whether Toney was already fading. By June 2006, Toney and Peter were ranked No. 2 and No. 3 contender for the WBC world heavyweight title respectively (No. 1 ranked Oleg Maskaev was already scheduled to face the champion Hasim Rahman). The bout was officially announced by Showtime on July 3 to take place at Staples Center in Los Angeles on September 2, with the winner becoming a mandatory challenger for the WBC title.

During the first press conference in July 12, Toney got into an argument with Duva and Gotzev, with Gotzev claiming that he was tired of the "Dan Goossen and Toney show; it is Samuel Peter's time", which angered Toney who took his jacket off and started walking towards Peter's team before being stopped by his own team; he did, however, praise Peter for taking the fight. Peter was also complimentary towards Toney: "For me to get a fight with Toney right now is a miracle. Toney is a great champion, a Hall of Famer. When he is in shape, he can make anybody look bad. He beat Ruiz, Holyfield and drew with Rahman. Toney has the heart of a real man, and I commend him for that. I give him credit for taking this fight." He also expressed readiness to take a big step up towards the title. A media telephone conference call on August 7 turned into a heated verbal clash between two boxers, with Toney taunting Peter and making controversial remarks, calling him "a slave", threatening to "send [his] ass back on a banana boat" and making offensive noises, with Peter responding "You don't even know where you are from. I'm from Nigeria. [...] You are a black man, you come from Africa and you call me a slave?" and mocking Toney for struggling to speak English despite being American. Toney then proceeded to discredit Peter's accomplishments: "All the guys he fought were paid to lay down. You know that. Weak opponents. Weak ass opponents. I have fought the best fighters in the world in five different weight classes. I have fought the best."

Toney continued to talk trash about Peter during a media session two weeks later, while also showing irritation over questions about his weight and claiming that he had "always been a heavyweight". The bad blood remained during the final press-conference, as Toney claimed to be one of the few "real fighters" in Peter's career and his trainer Freddie Roach criticizing Peter for throwing rabbit punches during his fights. Meanwhile, Peter promised the public to knock Toney out inside four rounds and "beat him so bad that when this is over he'll be my second wife. Ivaylo Gotzev showed confidence in Peter winning the fight but also provided some criticism: "Sam wants to knock people out but that has prevented people from seeing his boxing ability. He has lots of skills, quick hands, great boxing moves. [...] If he just targets the head, that would go against everything we worked on in camp. But headhunting is the most fun for him, he's a natural born killer, that's what killers do, they take the head off."

The vast majority of observers predicted Toney to win by unanimous decision. They credited Toney's experience and technique proven against the boxing's elite, alleging that that would turn out to be crucial against the 26-year old Peter, although some questioned whether Toney really proved himself to be a top-ranked heavyweight contender and credited Peter for being stronger and more powerful. For the fight Peter weighed in at 257 lbs, the heaviest in his entire career and 14 lbs higher than when he fought Wladimir Klitschko. Toney weighed in at 233 lbs, the same weight he recorded for a world title bout against John Ruiz and 4 pounds lighter than in his last fight against Hasim Rahman.

From the first round Peter went forward and fought behind the jab while also trying to consistently work Toney's body, while Toney fought mostly in a counterpunching manner, relying on his speed and slickness to keep Peter at bay and make him missing. After struggling with Toney's movement in the first two rounds, Peter hurt Toney in the third, sending him to the ropes, however Toney did not allow him to further capitalize on it. The trend of Toney landing more and Peter landing harder shots continued through the middle rounds. In the ninth, Peter was deducted a point for rabbit punching. He managed to hurt Toney with two right hands in the tenth. Peter changed his approach in the later rounds, relying more on volume punching, while Toney continued fighting mostly as a counterpuncher. In the end, Peter won the bout by split decision, with scores 116–111 twice in favor of Peter and 115–112 for Toney. "I never fought someone like that," Peter said in a post-fight interview. "I was thinking I was going to knock him out. But he's so smart. I had him hurt a couple of times, but he's so slick. He never hurt me; I'm solid like a rock. My game plan was to go in there and stick the jab, and it was working for me all night long." Both Toney and his trainer Freddie Roach disagreed with the final verdict and criticized Peter for rabbit punches and threatened to issue a protest.

The decision was widely disputed by boxing fans and media, many of whom believed Toney should've been given the victory and that he outstruck Peter and landed cleaner punches, although Peter was credited with landing the harder shots and there was acknowledgement that many rounds were close and competitive. The New York Post had Toney winning 114–113.

==== Peter vs. Toney II ====
As a result of the controversy, on September 27, WBC ordered a rematch between Toney and Peter. For the rematch, Toney hired fitness coach Billy Blanks. This time Peter weighed in at 249 lbs, dropping below 250 lbs for the first time since the Klitschko fight. Toney weighed in at 234 lbs, approximately the same as the previous encounter, but claimed to be "in 150 percent better shape now".

Peter started the fight at a high pace, increasing his work behind the jab compared to the first fight, while also showing more movement and patience and not allowing Toney to frustrate him. Peter staggered Toney in the first round but Toney managed to survive. In the second round, Peter knocked Toney down with a double jab, catching him off balance. Peter became the first man to send Toney to the canvas since 1994. Peter continued fighting aggressively and, with few exceptions, remained in control of the fight throughout the entire twelve rounds. By the middle rounds, as Peter successfully cracked through Toney's defense numerous times, Toney's eye began to swell and his defensive work considerably slowed down. Meanwhile, Peter also began to tire but was still doing the better work. Peter hurt Toney again with a big right hand in the eleventh. In the end the fight went the distance, with Peter being declared the winner by unanimous decision. The official judges' scorecards read 119–108, 118–110, 118–110. Unlike the first fight, there was little dispute among ringside observers about the rightful winner. ESPN had Peter winning 120–107, giving him every round.

"I taunted him. I gave him the Muhammad Ali shuffle with a little Floyd Mayweather, too," Peter said after the fight. "This was my best fight." Despite the victory, Ivaylo Gotzev rated Peter's performance at B−. Meanwhile, Dino Duva claimed that Peter could become undisputed heavyweight champion by the end of 2007 if the champions "have the nerve" to fight him. Peter earned $1.5 million for the fight, while Toney earned $1.1 million. With the victory, Peter solidified his status as the mandatory challenger for the WBC title.

==== Cancelled bout vs. Maskaev ====
Shortly afterwards, Dino Duva urged Dennis Rappaport, promoter of the then-WBC world heavyweight champion Oleg Maskaev, to start negotiations over a mandatory defense: "José Sulaimán and the WBC have made it clear that they are honoring their commitment for Maskaev to defend his title against Samuel Peter immediately. We respect Oleg, know that he is a true champion, and expect him to honor that commitment."

Initially, Maskaev did not express interest in fighting Peter, instead negotiating with the WBC Emeritus champion Vitali Klitschko, who was going to make a comeback after a 2-year retirement and had a history with Maskaev in amateur boxing (including a fight at the 1991 Soviet Army Championships, when Maskaev allegedly defeated Klitschko by first-round stoppage). Peter was offered between $2.5 and $3 million to step aside, under agreement that the winner of Maskaev-Klitschko fight would face him next. Eventually, negotiations between Klitschko and Maskaev broke down when Klitschko's team refused additional demands from both Maskaev's and Peter's teams: Maskaev wanted a purse of $5 million instead of the offered $3 million, while Peter was also not satisfied with his offer. On April 5, the teams of all three boxers agreed to give a green light to the Maskaev-Peter fight, under agreement that Vitali would be the first in line to face the winner. On April 9, WBC gave Maskaev and Peter time until April 20 to sign a contract, after which a purse offer would be held.

On May 7, Dino Duva won the purse bid with an offer of $3.201 million, ahead of $3.107 million offered by Don King, $2.5 million offered by Rappaport and $2.001 million offered by a Russian promoter. While Rappaport insisted that the purse bid should be split 70/30 in favor of the champion, Don King insisted on a more favorable 55/45; the disagreement put the fight's future at risk. Eventually, both sides reached a compromise and signed a contract on July 26. The fight would take place at Madison Square Garden on October 6 and was going to be the first one since the arena's ring was retired on September 19, although originally the retirement was expected to take place after the fight. Maskaev, Peter and Joe Frazier conducted a symbolic 10-count to "officially" retire the ring.

Going into the fight, predictions varied: some viewed Peter as a favorite due to being younger, faster and stronger than Maskaev, as well as having the better punch resistance and being overall stylistically difficult for Maskaev, while other considered Maskaev to me more skilled and proven against better opposition.

On September 21, it was announced that Maskaev was forced to pull out of the fight due to a herniated disc. The injury would keep him out of the ring for approximately 3–4 months. Because that would result in the WBC title being "frozen" for a total of 14 months (Maskaev made his last defense on December 10, 2006), Peter was promoted to the interim world heavyweight champion.

==== Peter vs. McCline ====
While waiting for Peter and Maskaev, Vitali Klitschko signed a contract to face Jameel McCline. The bout was going to take place in Munich on September 22, and was supposed to be a tune-up fight. On September 10, it was reported that Klitschko had suffered a back injury in training. McCline refused to wait for Klitschko, and instead on September 19 Don King announced that DaVarryl Williamson, ranked No.4 heavyweight contender by the WBA, would replace Vitali. However, after Maskaev pulled out of the fight against Peter, McCline was swiftly promoted in the WBC rankings to No.10 and then named as Maskaev's replacement. Such actions were enabled the organization's regulations, which give authority to the WBC Board of Governors to "take any action to resolve any special circumstance"; as McCline had been training for the Klitschko fight and was therefore "in good shape", he was deemed an adequate replacement. Some observers questioned whether McCline should be allowed to fight for the title due to allegations that McCline was using steroids; McCline allegedly received performance enhancing drugs worth more than $12,000 between 2005 and 2006 from Signature Pharmacy in Orlando, Florida. Despite this, the organizers decided to proceed with the fight.

In the build-up to the fight, Peter stated that he "feels great" being a world champion and dismissed notions that the "interim" tag undermines his world title status and that that he was undeserving of the title, hinting that he had already won it in the ring: "Remember when I fought the championship? I remember that it was twice, fought 24 rounds between September and January". Peter's promoter Dino Duva also criticized how Maskaev's team handled the fact that their fighter was injured, casting doubts whether the injury did actually occur. He expressed belief that McCline was a tougher fight for Peter than Maskaev due to his size and boxing skills, but despite everything, "the Samuel Peter heavyweight championship era begins Saturday". He also criticized Vitali Klitschko's team for failing to pay the step-aside money they promised.

Peter started the fight strong, establishing his jab and sometimes doubling and tripling the jab and combining that with movement that would not provide McCline with a target. Just before the end of the second round, which Peter was seemingly on course to win, McCline landed a short uppercut that sent Peter to the canvas for the first time in his boxing career. Shortly into the third round, McCline landed the uppercut again and followed it with a left-right combo, dropping Peter again. After Peter got up again, McCline went for the knockout, however Peter managed to survive the onslaught and started firing back, as McCline began to run out of stamina. Despite this, McCline managed to drop Peter for the third time with a left followed by two rights. In between the third and fourth rounds, Peter's corner urged their fighter not to engage in exchanges and box smarter. From the fourth round, Peter had more success keeping McCline at the end of his jab, while also keeping his offense versatile and not allowing McCline to fully regain his stamina and recapture the initiative. By the eighth round, many ringside observers had the fight close on their scorecards. McCline hurt Peter with an uppercut again in the eighth but failed to follow up. Both fighters looked tired in the championship rounds, however Peter managed to win the remaining three rounds, fighting cautiously in the twelfth in order to cruise into a decision victory. Ultimately, he was declared the winner by unanimous decision, with scores 115–110, 115–111 and 113–112.

"When I was knocked down I knew I had to stand up and defend my belt," said Peter. "I'm a champion. [...] Now I'm going home to bring the title back to Africa." He dismissed underestimating McCline, but admitted to have enter the fight with a broken left hand and hid it from the commission because he did not want to "follow Maskaev's footsteps". The fight was well received by observers, particularly Peter was praised for overcoming adversity and finding his way back into the fight after a difficult start, although McCline received some criticism for letting Peter off the hook after knocking him down three times.

=== WBC world heavyweight champion ===
==== Peter vs. Maskaev ====
As interim champion, he was a mandatory challenger for the WBC belt held by Oleg Maskaev, who had been inactive since December 2006 due to injury. This long-anticipated fight took place on March 8, 2008, at the principal bullfighting venue in Cancún, Mexico. Peter won by TKO, with the referee stopping the fight with only a few seconds remaining in the sixth round. Peter used far less movement than he had in his previous two bouts against Maskaev, from the first round onwards both were trading heavy shots. In round three Peter staggered Maskaev and was then rocked in return. Maskaev had not been able to really hurt Peter. Peter used his jab to pursue Maskaev in the sixth and eventually broke through with a big right hand. Maskaev staggered backwards and Peter moved in for the finish. Peter continued to pummel Maskaev on the ropes while Oleg tried to motion to the referee about rabbit punches. The referee stepped in with seconds remaining as Maskaev staggered backwards into the corner. Peter was ahead on all three judges' scorecards at the time of the stoppage.

==== Peter vs. Vitali Klitschko ====
Following his victory over Maskaev, he publicly challenged IBF, WBO and IBO champion Wladimir Klitschko to a unification bout, which would have been Klitschko's second such fight, as well as his second matchup with Peter (the first ending with a unanimous decision victory for Klitschko). Such a fight would have unified three of the four major titles, the closest the division had been to an undisputed champion since Lennox Lewis relinquished the WBA title (one of the three he then held) by court order on April 29, 2000. Klitschko indicated he might fight Peter, but suggested that Peter should fight his brother Vitali first. Vitali Klitschko had retired as WBC champion in November 2005, and was considered the WBC's champion emeritus, giving him the right to a mandatory challenge under the rules of that organization should he elect to fight again. At the time of his retirement, Vitali was the dominant force in his division. Both had a claim to being the rightful WBC belt holder. Yet there was added importance for the bout; if Vitali were to win it would mean that both brothers would achieve their dream of being heavyweight champions at the same time. On the other hand, if Peter were to win and then challenge Wladimir in a rematch, it would bring the heavyweight division close to the first undisputed title holder in years. Peter accepted the WBC's ruling and the bout was scheduled for October 11 at O2 World Berlin.

Klitschko had a memorable ring entrance with five former heavyweight champions appearing to wish him luck in his comeback. Klitschko would reclaim his belt in dominating fashion. Although he was coming back from a four-year layoff, Klitschko was sharp from the opening bell. Peter had been expected to set the pace and pursue Vitali, instead he spent time outside trying to box his way in. Klitschko took the center of the ring and found Peter an easy target. Peter landed two hard right hands in the second round, but they had almost no effect on Vitali at all. After four rounds Peter's face was swelling and his corner was growing in frustration. His corner implored him to let his hands go and push Vitali back. Peter tried to rally in the sixth round, but only made himself an even more open target for Klitschko's counter punches. The seventh round was extremely punishing for the defending champion as he ate several left hooks, right crosses and jabs. Peter seemed unresponsive to his corner's advice after a few rounds. As his corner tried to give him instructions the scores of the fight were read out by the ring announcer. Two judges had Klitschko ahead by 80–72, and one by 79–73. Peter informed he did not wish to continue, prompting the referee to stop the fight and declare Klitschko the winner.

=== Defeat to Chambers and return to form ===
Looking to bounce back to the heavyweight title picture, Peter faced Eddie Chambers on March 27, 2009. The fight took place at Nokia Theatre in Los Angeles, and was aired on ESPN2. Chambers injured his right thumb early in the third round, but was able to outbox Peter for the majority of the fight, frustrating his opponent with speed and quickness and being able to block most of Peter's shots using his gloves and armes. As a result, Chambers was declared the winner by majority decision, with the judges scoring the bout 99–91, 96–94 and 95–95. Some observers criticized the 95–95 score, believing Peter had not done enough to win more than three rounds.

He fought Marcus McGee on July 25, 2009, in Mexico, knocking him unconscious in the third round with a right hand. He weighed in at a 243 lbs for this fight.

His next fight was on September 15, 2009, against the little known Ronald Bellamy. Peter won by second-round knockout. He then fought journeyman Gabe Brown and won by fourth round stoppage.

Following his three successful victories over journeymen, Peter took a step up in competition against Nagy Aguilera in an IBF eliminator (Aguilera had earned the position with a stunning first-round knockout of former champion Oleg Maskaev). Peter came in at 237 pounds, the lightest since his seventh pro fight. He dominated an entertaining first round before sending Aguilera down in the second with a right hand counter, Nagy beat the count but was stopped soon after as he was hanging against the ropes, taking heavy shots.

Peter then targeted either a rematch with Wladimir Klitschko or a final IBF eliminator with unbeaten Alexander Povetkin. Sensing that Povetkin was not willing to fight Klitschko, Peter made himself available as a replacement opponent. Both Peter and Povetkin were ranked as #1 IBF contenders.

=== Peter vs. Wladimir Klitschko II and release from Top Rank ===
On September 11, 2010, Peter fought Wladimir Klitschko again at the Commerzbank Arena in Frankfurt, Germany, for the IBF, WBO, and IBO heavyweight titles. Peter weighed in at 241 pounds, two pounds lighter than the first fight. Klitschko came in at a career heavy of 247 pounds. Both fighters had promised knockouts in the pre fight build up. Peter started the fight very aggressively in a bob and weave style he had never before fought in. He caught Klitschko with a good left hook in the opening round, though Klitschko remained unshaken. Klitschko ended the round well. In the second round Klitschko caught Peter with three hard right hands, one of which seemed to stun him. Both fighters struggled to land punches in the third round, there was a lot of clinching in what was a physical encounter. Unlike their first fight referee Robert Byrd did not let Peter punch on the break or hit to the back of the head. After four rounds the fight became one sided, with Peter's right eye closing. Peter could not find the target and started lunging with wild shots, his legs had slowed dramatically and he was taking heavy shots. He did get through with a big right hand in round six though. Klitschko, instead of going backwards as he did in their first fight, would meet Peter in the middle of the ring and dominate him physically in the clinches. Peter was taking heavy punishment and after eight rounds was totally exhausted. After the ninth round Peter's cornerman Abel Sanchez threatened to stop the fight, and said he would give him one more round. Emanuel Steward implored Klitschko to throw combinations. Peter swung wildly in the tenth and Klitschko opened up with a punishing combination which floored him. Referee Robert Byrd did not start a count and waved the fight off, awarding Klitschko the win by knockout. It was Klitschko's ninth successful title defense.

The nature of the defeat to Klitschko in the rematch possibly spelled the end of Peter's career as a top level fighter. Top Rank released him from his contract soon after. In spite of this Peter's manager said they would look to secure other big fights in the division against anyone other than the Klitschko brothers.

=== Peter vs. Helenius ===
After his release from Top Rank, Peter and his management sent an offer to Tomasz Adamek for an IBF elimination match. The fight fell through when Peter refused Adamek's challenger money of $150,000. Peter then went into negotiations for a fight with Tye Fields which also failed to materialise. Then, in March 2011, it was revealed that Peter would travel to Germany to face undefeated Finnish prospect Robert Helenius. Peter was rumoured to be in training with Jeff Mayweather, however, Mayweather was not present for Peter's fight against Helenius. Peter weighed in for the contest at 260 pounds (120 kg), 18.5 lbs heavier than in the Klitschko fight. Peter was without a reputed trainer or even a cutman for the fight. Peter had reasonable success in the first half of the bout, winning several of the first six rounds; however, after that point Peter began to tire. The end came when Helenius knocked down an exhausted Peter in round nine, Peter got to his feet only to be sent back to the canvas where he remained for well over the 10 second count, awarding Helenius the win by KO. The nature of the loss to Helenius, as well as Peter's terrible physical condition led many to call for Peter's retirement from boxing.

=== 2014 return ===
Peter made an unexpected return to the ring on September 27, 2014, to face journeyman Ron Aubrey. Peter came into the ring at an all-time career heavy of 271 pounds (123 kg), and was struggling to walk before the bout began. Peter ended the fight when a vicious right hook knocked Aubrey unconscious in the first round.

=== Fight cancellations ===
During his four-year period of near total inactivity, Peter had been signed to fight several opponents with all the bouts being cancelled. He was scheduled to compete in the Super 8 boxing tournament, but pulled out due to injury. He was then scheduled to face former title challenger Alex Leapai but once again he pulled out as the fight neared. He then signed to fight Alexander Ustinov but again cancelled the fight with only days to go. Peter was close to agreeing to fight Luis Ortiz before eventually being replaced.

=== Career from 2016–present ===
At the age of 36, after a two-year layoff, Peter returned to the ring on October 23 fighting in Mexico, defeating unknown boxer Juan Carlos Salas (6–9) in three rounds. Peter weighed 262-pounds. It was still unclear if Peter would be returning to boxing full-time.

On November 1, there were early talks that Peter would be fighting former world title challenger Kubrat Pulev in December in Sofia, Bulgaria. Pulev, ranked at number 2 with the IBF, recently defeated Derek Chisora via decision in May. A fight was confirmed five days later by Team Sauerland, officially announcing the fight between Peter and Pulev on December 3 in Bulgaria. This would be a stay busy fight for Pulev before his anticipated European title defense against Polish boxer Mariusz Wach. Pulev vacated his European title on November 22. In front of 15,000 at the Arena Armeec, Pulev defeated Peter via fourth round corner retirement (RTD) to win the vacant WBA Inter-Continental heavyweight title. Peter was aggressive throughout but struggled with Pulev's jab. The fight was stopped after round three when Peter dislocated his right shoulder while throwing a big punch. He went back to the corner leaning towards the right side and the injury forced him to retire.

Peter returned to Mexico once again on February 22, 2019, having not fought in two years. He appeared at the Cheers Bar & Grill in Tijuana knocking out Gerardo Escobar in just 44 seconds of the fight starting. On March 26 Peter signed a promotional contract with Salita Promotions and was announced to fight Mexican journeyman Mario Heredia (15–6–1, 13 KOs) on April 13 at the Boardwalk Hall in Atlantic City on the undercard of Claressa Shields vs. Christina Hammer. Prior to the fight, Heredia was 2–5–1 in his previous eight bouts. Peter lost an eight-round split decision to Heredia, which took place at the Adrian Phillips Theater. Peter scored a knockdown in round-three yet was unable to finish Heredia, who fought on and prevailed by scores of 77–74 and 76–75, with the third judge giving Peter the nod via a 79–72 margin.

== Personal life ==
Peter is a devout Christian who neither drinks nor smokes. He lives in Las Vegas, Nevada. Peter is the nephew of Nigerian professional wrestler Great Power Uti.

== Professional boxing record ==
47 fights	38 wins	9 losses
By knockout	31	6
By decision	7	3

No.	Result	Record	Opponent	Type	Round, time	Date	Location	Notes
47	Loss	38–9	Arslanbek Makhmudov	TKO	1 (10), 2:23	Dec 7, 2019	Bell Centre, Montreal, Canada	For WBC-NABF heavyweight title
46	Loss	38–8	Hughie Fury	TKO	7 (12), 2:07	Jul 12, 2019	King Abdullah Sports City, Jeddah, Saudi Arabia	
45	Win	38–7	Alejandro Garduno	KO	1 (10), 2:32	Apr 27, 2019	Cheers Bar & Grill, Tijuana, Mexico	
44	Loss	37–7	Mario Heredia	SD	8	Apr 13, 2019	Boardwalk Hall, Atlantic City, New Jersey, US	
43	Win	37–6	Gerardo Escobar	KO	1 (10), 0:44	Feb 22, 2019	Cheers Bar & Grill, Tijuana, Mexico	
42	Loss	36–6	Kubrat Pulev	RTD	3 (12), 3:00	Dec 3, 2016	Arena Armeec, Sofia, Bulgaria	For vacant WBA Inter-Continental heavyweight title
41	Win	36–5	Juan Carlos Salas	RTD	3 (4), 3:00	Oct 23, 2016	As Boxing Arena, Tijuana, Mexico	
40	Win	35–5	Ron Aubrey	TKO	1 (8), 2:34	Sep 27, 2014	OKC Downtown Airpark, Oklahoma City, Oklahoma, US	
39	Loss	34–5	Robert Helenius	KO	9 (12), 1:50	Apr 2, 2011	Gerry Weber Stadium, Halle, Germany	For WBO Inter-Continental, and vacant WBA Inter-Continental heavyweight titles
38	Loss	34–4	Wladimir Klitschko	KO	10 (12), 1:22	Sep 11, 2010	Commerzbank-Arena, Frankfurt, Germany	For IBF, WBO, IBO, and The Ring heavyweight titles
37	Win	34–3	Nagy Aguilera	TKO	2 (12), 2:24	Mar 12, 2010	Gaylord Texan Resort Hotel & Convention Center, Grapevine, Texas, US	
36	Win	33–3	Gabe Brown	TKO	4 (8), 2:58	Dec 19, 2009	Beeghly Center, Youngstown, Ohio, US	
35	Win	32–3	Ronald Bellamy	TKO	2 (8), 1:36	Sep 15, 2009	Plaza de Toros, Cancún, Mexico	
34	Win	31–3	Marcus McGee	KO	3 (8)	Jul 25, 2009	Palenque del Recinto Ferial, Nuevo Vallarta, Mexico	
33	Loss	30–3	Eddie Chambers	MD	10	Mar 27, 2009	Nokia Theatre L.A. Live, Los Angeles, California, US	
32	Loss	30–2	Vitali Klitschko	RTD	8 (12), 3:00	Oct 11, 2008	O2 World Arena, Berlin, Germany	Lost WBC heavyweight title
31	Win	30–1	Oleg Maskaev	TKO	6 (12), 2:56	Mar 8, 2008	Plaza de Toros, Cancún, Mexico	Won WBC heavyweight title
30	Win	29–1	Jameel McCline	UD	12	Oct 6, 2007	Madison Square Garden, New York City, New York, US	Won vacant WBC interim heavyweight title
29	Win	28–1	James Toney	UD	12	Jan 6, 2007	Hard Rock Live, Hollywood, Florida, US	Retained WBC-NABF heavyweight title
28	Win	27–1	James Toney	SD	12	Sep 2, 2006	Staples Center, Los Angeles, California, US	Retained NABF heavyweight title; Won IBA heavyweight title
27	Win	26–1	Julius Long	KO	1 (12), 2:35	Apr 28, 2006	Mohegan Sun Arena, Montville, Connecticut, US	Won vacant WBC-NABF heavyweight title
26	Win	25–1	Robert Hawkins	UD	10	Dec 15, 2005	Hard Rock Live, Hollywood, Florida, US	Won vacant WBA–NABA heavyweight title
25	Loss	24–1	Wladimir Klitschko	UD	12	Sep 24, 2005	Boardwalk Hall, Atlantic City, New Jersey, US	Lost WBC-NABF heavyweight title; For vacant WBO–NABO heavyweight title
24	Win	24–0	Taurus Sykes	KO	2 (12), 2:07	Jul 2, 2005	Events Center, Reno, Nevada, US	Retained WBC-NABF, and IBF-USBA heavyweight titles; Won WBA–NABA heavyweight title
23	Win	23–0	Gilbert Martinez	TKO	3 (10), 2:05	Apr 29, 2005	Union Plaza Hotel and Casino, Las Vegas, Nevada, US	
22	Win	22–0	Yanqui Díaz	TKO	5 (12), 0:54	Jan 22, 2005	American Airlines Arena, Miami, Florida, US	Won vacant IBF-USBA heavyweight title
21	Win	21–0	Jeremy Williams	KO	2 (12), 0:27	Dec 4, 2004	Mandalay Bay Events Center, Paradise, Nevada, US	Won vacant WBC-NABF heavyweight title
20	Win	20–0	Jovo Pudar	UD	10	Aug 5, 2004	Hard Rock Live, Hollywood, Florida, US	
19	Win	19–0	Charles Shufford	UD	10	May 17, 2004	Bally's Las Vegas, Paradise, Nevada, US	
18	Win	18–0	Jose Arimatea Da Silva	TKO	2 (8), 2:20	Mar 6, 2004	Foxwoods Resort Casino, Ledyard, Connecticut, US	
17	Win	17–0	Chris Isaac	TKO	7 (8), 0:29	Jan 22, 2004	Glendale Arena, Glendale, Arizona, US	
16	Win	16–0	Jason Farley	TKO	2 (10)	Sep 27, 2003	HSBC Arena, Buffalo, New York, US	
15	Win	15–0	Daniel Frank	KO	2 (8)	Aug 30, 2003	Sam's Town Hotel and Gambling Hall, Tunica, Mississippi, US	
14	Win	14–0	Lyle McDowell	TKO	4 (6), 2:12	Jun 21, 2003	Staples Center, Los Angeles, California, US	
13	Win	13–0	Dale Crowe	TKO	4 (10), 1:08	Mar 7, 2003	City Center Pavilion, Reno, Nevada, US	Won vacant WBC Youth heavyweight title
12	Win	12–0	Cornelius Ellis	TKO	2 (4), 0:32	Jul 24, 2002	Mandalay Bay Events Center, Paradise, Nevada, US	
11	Win	11–0	Francis Royal	TKO	2 (6), 2:24	Jun 7, 2002	Rawhide Arena, Scottsdale, Arizona, US	
10	Win	10–0	Terry Porter	KO	2 (4), 2:54	May 24, 2002	Brady Theater, Tulsa, Oklahoma, US	
9	Win	9–0	Julius Joiner	RTD	1 (4)	Mar 22, 2002	Celebrity Theatre, Phoenix, Arizona, US	
8	Win	8–0	Marion Wilson	UD	4	Mar 3, 2002	Catholic Youth Center, Scranton, Pennsylvania, US	
7	Win	7–0	Curtis Taylor	KO	1 (4)	Nov 10, 2001	Fernwood Resort, Bushkill, Pennsylvania, US	
6	Win	6–0	Giles Knox	TKO	1 (4), 1:58	Sep 28, 2001	Caesars Palace, Paradise, Nevada, US	
5	Win	5–0	Freddy Gatica	TKO	1 (4), 1:30	Aug 25, 2001	Flamingo, Laughlin, Nevada, US	
4	Win	4–0	Shannon Head	TKO	1 (4)	Jul 28, 2001	Exhibition Hall, Fort Myers, Florida, US	
3	Win	3–0	George Chamberlain	TKO	1 (4)	May 25, 2001	Estadio Carlos Dittborn, Arica, Chile	
2	Win	2–0	James Lester	TKO	3 (4)	May 10, 2001	Biltmore Hotel, Phoenix, Arizona, US	
1	Win	1–0	Georgi Hristov	KO	1 (4), 1:30	Feb 6, 2001	Baluan Sholak Sports Palace, Almaty, Kazakhstan	

== Viewership ==
=== Germany ===
Date	Fight	Viewership (avg.)	Network	Source(s)
October 11, 2008	Samuel Peter vs. Vitali Klitschko	9,670,000	RTL Television	
June 8, 2010	Wladimir Klitschko vs. Samuel Peter II	9,700,000	RTL Television	
April 2, 2011	Samuel Peter vs. Robert Helenius	2,550,000	Das Erste	
	Total viewership	21,920,000		

=== Nigeria ===
Date	Fight	Viewership (min.)	Network	Source(s)
March 8, 2008	Oleg Maskaev vs. Samuel Peter	30,000,000	N/A	
	Total viewership	30,000,000		

=== United States ===
Date	Fight	Viewership (avg.)	Network	Source(s)
September 24, 2005	Samuel Peter vs. Wladimir Klitschko I	2,036,000	HBO	(Note: average number of households)
March 8, 2008	Oleg Maskaev vs. Samuel Peter	1,236,000	HBO	
	Total viewership	3,272,000		

Sporting positions
Regional boxing titles
Vacant Title last held by Arthur Cook	WBC Youth heavyweight champion March 7, 2003 – June 2003; Vacated	Vacant Title next held by Oleg Platov
Vacant Title last held by DaVarryl Williamson	NABF heavyweight champion December 4, 2004 – September 24, 2005	Succeeded by Wladimir Klitschko
Vacant Title last held by Tye Fields	USBA heavyweight champion January 22, 2005 – September 24, 2005; Vacated	Vacant Title next held by Shannon Briggs
Preceded by Taurus Sykes	WBA–NABA heavyweight champion July 2, 2005 – March 2006; Vacated	Vacant Title next held by Shannon Briggs
Vacant Title last held by Wladimir Klitschko	NABF heavyweight champion April 28, 2006 – June 2007; Vacated	Vacant Title next held by Hasim Rahman
Minor world boxing titles
Preceded by James Toney	IBA heavyweight champion September 2, 2006 – January 2007; Vacated	Vacant Title next held by James Toney
Major world boxing titles
Vacant Title last held by Hasim Rahman	WBC heavyweight champion Interim title October 6, 2007 – March 8, 2008; Won full title	Vacant Title next held by Dillian Whyte
Preceded by Oleg Maskaev	WBC heavyweight champion 8 March 2008 – October 11, 2008	Succeeded by Vitali Klitschko
