= Cedric Boswell =

American boxer (born 1969)

Personal information
- Nickname: The Bos
- Born: Cedric Boswell; July 21, 1969 (age 57) Detroit, Michigan, U.S.
- Height: 6 ft 3 in (191 cm)
- Weight: Heavyweight

Boxing career
- Stance: Orthodox

Boxing record
- Total fights: 36
- Wins: 34
- Win by KO: 26
- Losses: 2
- Draws: 0
- No contests: 0

Cedric Boswell (born July 21, 1969) is an American professional boxer. He was touted as a future heavyweight contender early in his pro career, which began in 1994.

== Amateur career ==
As an amateur, he defeated Shannon Briggs on points at the National Golden Gloves quarterfinals.

== Professional career ==
Known as "The Bos", Boswell began his professional career with 21 straight wins, blasting out limited opposition to set up a fight against Jameel McCline in 2003. McCline won via TKO in the 10th, and Boswell didn't fight again until 2006.

Boswell fought undefeated (27-0) Roman Greenberg in August 2008, and won via a shocking 2nd-round TKO.

As of July 2009, he was 30-1 and ranked 38th in the International Boxing Organization's heavyweight computerized rankings. He also ranked 14th in the United States in the heavyweight division.

On December 3, 2011, Boswell lost to Alexander Povetkin for the WBA (regular) title. The fight took place at Hartwall Arena, Helsinki, Finland.

== Professional boxing record ==
35 Wins (26 knockouts, 9 decisions), 2 Losses (2 knockouts, 0 decisions)
Result	Record	Opponent	Type	Round	Date	Location	Notes
Loss	22-0	(Russia) Alexander Povetkin	KO	8	2011-12-03	Helsinki, Finland	WBA Heavyweight Title. Boswell knocked out at 2:58 of the eighth round.
Win	20-2	(Trinidad and Tobago) Kertson Manswell	UD	10	2011-06-04	(United States) Hollywood, Florida, U.S.	WBC Latino/NABA Heavyweight Titles.
Win	55-10	(United States) Oliver McCall	UD	10	2011-03-18	(United States) Hollywood, Florida, U.S.	WBC Latino/NABA Heavyweight Titles.
Win	20-9-1	(United States) Dominique Alexander	TKO	2	2011-01-22	(United States) White Sulphur Springs, West Virginia, U.S.	WBC Latino Heavyweight Title. Referee stopped the bout at 2:44 of the second round.
Win	29-6	(Jamaica) Owen Beck	KO	9	2010-12-07	(United States) Hollywood, Florida, U.S.	WBC Latino Heavyweight Title. Beck knocked out at 2:29 of the ninth round.
Win	23-15-2	(Mali) Cisse Salif	UD	8	2009-09-26	(United States) Los Angeles, California, U.S.	
Win	9-6-2	(Turkey) Serdal Uysal	TKO	6	2009-06-20	Gelsenkirchen, Germany	
Win	15-19-2	(United States) Harold Sconiers	TKO	1	2009-04-03	(United States) Memphis, Tennessee, U.S.	Referee stopped the bout at 2:25 of the first round.
Win	27-0	(Israel) Roman Greenberg	TKO	2	2008-08-29	(United States) Atlanta, Georgia, U.S.	IBF North American/USBA Heavyweight Titles. Referee stopped the bout at 2:05 of the second round.
Win	26-16-2	(United States) Cliff Couser	TKO	2	2008-07-12	(United States) Atlantic City, New Jersey, U.S.	Referee stopped the bout at 1:46 of the second round.
Win	15-19-1	(United States) Zack Page	UD	8	2008-05-23	(United States) Memphis, Tennessee, U.S.	
Win	18-7	(United States) Josh Gutcher	KO	2	2007-12-01	(United States) Mashantucket, Connecticut, U.S.	Gutcher knocked out at 2:18 of the second round.
Win	34-11	(United States) Steve Pannell	KO	1	2007-05-18	(United States) Broomfield, Colorado, U.S.	Pannell knocked out at 2:35 of the first round.
Win	9-6	(United States) Robert Kooser	TKO	1	2007-01-12	(United States) Auburn Hills, Michigan, U.S.	Referee stopped the bout at 1:12 of the first round.
Win	7-11	(United States) Wallace McDaniel	TKO	2	2006-04-28	(United States) Atlanta, Georgia, U.S.	Referee stopped the bout at 2:41 of the second round.
Loss	29-3-3	(United States) Jameel McCline	TKO	10	2003-10-03	(United States) Las Vegas, Nevada, U.S.	Referee stopped the bout at 2:07 of the tenth round.
Win	25-1	(United States) Jim Strohl	TKO	5	2003-01-25	(United States) Temecula, California, U.S.	Referee stopped the bout at 2:46 of the fifth round.
Win	6-3	(United States) Willie Perryman	KO	3	2002-12-06	(United States) Atlanta, Georgia, U.S.	
Win	21-3-3	(United States) Talmadge Griffis	TKO	2	2002-11-03	(United States) Friant, California, U.S.	Referee stopped the bout at 2:44 of the second round.
Win	23-11-1	(United States) Melvin Foster	UD	8	2002-09-22	(United States) Friant, California, U.S.	
Win	5-7-2	(United States) Clarence Goins	KO	2	2002-08-18	(United States) Temecula, California, U.S.	Goins knocked out at 2:19 of the second round.
Win	13-4-2	(United States) Terry Porter	TKO	7	1999-12-18	(United States) Tunica, Mississippi, U.S.	Referee stopped the bout at 3:00 of the seventh round.
Win	5-6	(United States) Mike Middleton	TKO	2	1999-05-15	(United States) Miami, Florida, U.S.	Referee stopped the bout at 2:38 of the second round.
Win	31-17-2	(Mexico) Mike Sedillo	UD	10	1998-05-12	Ottawa, Ontario, Canada	
Win	16-60-2	(United States) Danny Wofford	TKO	3	1997-09-09	(United States) Nashville, Tennessee, U.S.	
Win	14-0	(United States) Marcus McIntyre	TKO	3	1997-06-17	(United States) Bay Saint Louis, Mississippi, U.S.	
Win	2-0-1	(United States) Jermaine Woods	UD	6	1997-04-18	(United States) Las Vegas, Nevada, U.S.	
Win	0-1	Gerald Mitchell	TKO	1	1997-02-26	(United States) Nashville, Tennessee, U.S.	
Win	0-1	(Russia) Alexander Vasiliev	TKO	5	1996-10-08	(United Kingdom) London, England	
Win	8-4	(United Kingdom) Keith Fletcher	TKO	3	1996-04-02	(United Kingdom) Southwark, London, England	
Win	1-3	(United States) Jeff Garrigan	KO	1	1995-08-23	(United States) Chicago, Illinois, U.S.	
Win	3-5	(United States) Bradley Rone	PTS	4	1995-05-23	(United States) Auburn Hills, Michigan, U.S.	
Win	--	Nelson Ramsey	KO	1	1995-04-26	(United States) Auburn Hills, Michigan, U.S.	
Win	--	Bernard Hatcher	KO	1	1995-03-31	(United States) Detroit, Michigan, U.S.	
Win	--	(United States) Nardi Johnson	TKO	1	1995-03-01	(United States) Rosemont, Illinois, U.S.	
Win	2-39-2	(United States) Jordan Keepers	PTS	4	1995-01-26	(United States) Rosemont, Illinois, U.S.	
Win	2-0	(United States) Tommy Clark	TKO	4	1994-07-20	(United States) Detroit, Michigan, U.S.	

== Filmography ==
Year	Title	Role	Notes
2023	Big George Foreman	Sonny Liston	
