= Oleg Maskaev =

Russian-American boxer (born 1969)

Oleg Maskaev Олег Маскаев
Personal information
- Nickname: The Big O
- Nationality: Russian (since 2006); American (since 2004); Uzbekistani (1991−2004); Soviet (until 1991)
- Born: Oleg Alexandrovich Maskaev; 2 March 1969 (age 57) Abay, Karaganda, Kazakh SSR, Soviet Union (now Kazakhstan)
- Height: 1.91 m (6 ft 3 in)
- Weight: Heavyweight

Boxing career
- Reach: 201 cm (79 in)
- Stance: Orthodox

Boxing record
- Total fights: 46
- Wins: 39
- Win by KO: 28
- Losses: 7
Medal record
Men's amateur boxing
Representing Uzbekistan
World Cup
Silver medal – second place	1994 Bangkok	Super heavyweight
Asian Games
Gold medal – first place	1994 Hiroshima	Super heavyweight

Oleg Alexandrovich Maskaev (Russian: Олег Александрович Маскаев; born 2 March 1969) is a Kazakhstan-born Russian and American former professional boxer, who competed from 1995 to 2013, and held the WBC heavyweight title from 2006 to 2008. Throughout his career, he represented the Soviet Union, Uzbekistan, the United States, and Russia.

== Biography ==
Oleg Maskaev was born in Abay, Karaganda, Soviet Kazakhstan, to Russian parents. His father is Moksha from the Zubova Polyana district of Mordovia, while his mother is Ukrainian from Kuban, southern Russia.

== Amateur career ==
Maskaev, a former mine worker, began his boxing career in the 1980s as an amateur in his hometown Abay. In 1991, he stopped future WBC world champion Vitali Klitschko in the second round.

Maskaev was the champion of the Soviet Army and later the national cup winner. He first represented the Soviet Union and then subsequently Uzbekistan following the collapse of the Soviet Union. Representing Uzbekistan, he won a gold medal at the 1994 Asian Games.

=== Highlights ===
(silver) X Summer Spartakiad of Peoples of the USSR, boxing (+91 kg), Minsk, Belarus SSR, July 1991:

- 1/2: Defeated Vitali Klitschko (Ukrainian SSR) RSC 2
- Finals: Lost to Nikolay Kulpin (Kazakh SSR)

(gold) VIII Military Spartakiad of the Friendly Armies of the Socialist Countries (+91 kg), Kiskunfelegyhaza, Hungary, October 1990:

- Finals: Defeated János Sulyok (Hungary) walkover

USA−USSR Middle & Heavy Duals (+91 kg), Camp Lejeune, North Carolina, December 1991:

- Defeated Samson Poʻuha (United States) RSC 2

World Championships (+91 kg), Tampere, Finland May 1993:

- 1/16: Defeated Zourab Sarsania (Georgia) DQ 3
- 1/8: Defeated Oleksandr Litvin (Ukraine) RSC 2
- 1/4: Lost to Roberto Balado (Cuba) KO 3

(silver) World Cup (+91 kg), Bangkok, Thailand, June 1994:

- 1/8: Defeated Raj Kumar Sangwan (India) 11–3 (4 rds)
- 1/4: Defeated Arshak Avartakyan (Armenia) 12–6 (4 rds)
- 1/2: Defeated Willi Fischer (Germany) RSC 1
- Finals: Lost to Roberto Balado (Cuba) walkover

(gold) Asian Games (+91 kg), Hiroshima, Japan, October 1994:

- 1/2: Defeated Raj Kumar Sangwan (India) RSC 2
- Finals: Defeated Mohamed Reza Kalkh Samadi (Iran) RSC 2

Maskaev resumed his amateur career within a month after his reported professional debut in April 1993, to participate in the 1993 World Championships, '94 World Cup, and '94 Asian Games, winning a gold medal at the latter.

Maskaev finished his amateur career with a stated record of 108–10.

== Professional career ==
Maskaev's professional boxing career began in 1993. Not wasting any time, he made his professional debut against former bronze medalist Alexander Miroshnichenko, who held a record of 21–0 (15 KOs). Maskaev won via third-round TKO. In only his seventh professional bout, Maskaev was pitted against Oliver McCall, who had captured the WBC heavyweight title by knocking out Lennox Lewis only a year before. Controversy later arose as to his professional record: before he fought McCall, the USBA stated his professional record was 15–0, 12 KOs, which was confirmed ex officio by the Virginia Boxing Commission (which sanctioned the Maskaev–McCall event and all subsequent official information related to it, including the records); however, later and supposedly more precise estimates gave him a record of 6–0 (3 KOs). Nine missing bouts in the given record were either unaccounted for—and therefore non-sanctioned events—or considered as either amateur or exhibition fights. No data is available presently for that missing part of Maskaev's early professional career.

Against McCall, Maskaev was caught with a hard left hand to the body, followed up with a short right hand in the first round, losing via TKO and being handed his first professional defeat. After winning his next four, Maskaev fought hard-hitting Samoan David Tua. Maskaev lost via 11th-round TKO.

His most famous victories have been his two wins over Hasim Rahman. In the first bout, held on November 6, 1999, Maskaev knocked Rahman off balance, sending his rival out of the ring in the 8th round. This fight is also notable for the famous "chair incident," in which noted referee, Steve Smoger (serving as backup referee for this fight), was struck in the head by a chair thrown by a fan. The assailant was later arrested.

He later fought Rahman again and defeated him for the WBC heavyweight title by knocking him out in the 12th round on August 12, 2006. His second win over Rahman was preceded by a streak of victories that helped rejuvenate Maskaev's career and earned him the "Comeback fighter of the Year" award from The Ring magazine in 2006.

Maskaev won his first title defense against Peter Okhello on December 10, 2006, by unanimous decision.

Maskaev fought against Samuel Peter for the WBC Heavyweight title on March 8, 2008, and was doing well in the early rounds, despite Peter's repeated rabbit punching and the referee's warnings. In the fifth round, Maskaev landed some of his best shots on his opponents chin, but to no avail; Peter was seemingly unaffected, visibly shaking Maskaev. Maskaev eventually lost by TKO, with 3 seconds remaining in the sixth round.

In late 2008, he beat opponent Robert Hawkins by UD after 10 rounds and then defeated the unheralded Rich Boruff on March 14, 2009, via first-round KO, giving him mandatory contender status to the WBC Heavyweight Championship. He fought Nagy Aguilera on December 11 of that year in Sacramento, California at the Memorial Auditorium in a tune up fight, but was knocked out in the first round. Stunned with an overhand right-left hook combo and knocked down soon after, another barrage by Aquilera hit Maskaev hard, knocking him out. Maskaev did not land a punch in the fight, later stating that he would retire following the loss. However, he returned to the ring 3 years later, knocking out Owen Beck. In 2013, he decisioned Jason Gavern in a 10-round fight. His last fight was against Danny Williams, whom he defeated by a 10-round UD on November 4, 2013, at Krasnodar, Russia. He retired with a record of 39–7, with 28 KOs.

As a professional, Maskaev was known for his powerful right-hand punch: he knocked out former WBO heavyweight challenger Derrick Jefferson, contender Alex Stewart, and twice knocked out former WBC heavyweight champion Hasim Rahman. However, he was also noted for a weak chin, which was evident in his knockout losses to Oliver McCall, David Tua, Kirk Johnson, Lance Whitaker, Corey Sanders, and journeyman Nagy Aguilera.

== Nationality ==
Maskaev was born in Kazakhstan (then part of the USSR) to Mordvin-Ukrainian parents from Soviet Russia. Following the end of the Soviet Union, he resided in Uzbekistan for a brief period, representing them at the 1994 Asian Games. He has lived in the U.S. since 1999 with his wife, Svetlana, and four daughters. He acquired US citizenship in 2004. He currently resides in West Sacramento, California, after previously living in Staten Island, New York. Before his second encounter with Hasim Rahman in 2006, he said "I would say I'm a proud Russian-American. So right now, I'm a citizen of America, of [the] United States... Whoever is going to win is going to be American." In the run-up to his title defense against Peter Okhello, he stated regarding his citizenship: "Russian. I don't want to talk about that anymore. I will walk to the ring under the Russian flag and Russian anthem as I'm now a Russian citizen." Russian president Vladimir Putin granted him Russian citizenship on December 9, 2006.

== Professional boxing record ==
46 fights	39 wins	7 losses
By knockout	28	7
By decision	11	0

No.	Result	Record	Opponent	Type	Round, time	Date	Location	Notes
46	Win	39–7	Danny Williams	UD	10	4 Nov 2013	Basket-Hall, Krasnodar, Russia	
45	Win	38–7	Jason Gavern	UD	10	26 May 2013	Sports Complex Mordovia, Saransk, Russia	
44	Win	37–7	Owen Beck	TKO	3 (10), 2:59	30 Dec 2012	Sports Palace Quant, Moscow, Russia	
43	Loss	36–7	Nagy Aguilera	TKO	1 (10), 1:54	11 Dec 2009	Memorial Auditorium, Sacramento, California, US	
42	Win	36–6	Rich Boruff	TKO	1 (10), 1:35	14 Mar 2009	Ice Palace, Saransk, Russia	
41	Win	35–6	Robert Hawkins	UD	10	6 Sep 2008	Red Square, Moscow, Russia	
40	Loss	34–6	Samuel Peter	TKO	6 (12), 2:56	8 Mar 2008	Plaza de Toros, Cancún, Mexico	Lost WBC heavyweight title
39	Win	34–5	Okello Peter	UD	12	10 Dec 2006	Olympic Stadium, Moscow, Russia	Retained WBC heavyweight title
38	Win	33–5	Hasim Rahman	TKO	12 (12), 2:17	12 Aug 2006	Thomas & Mack Center, Paradise, Nevada, US	Won WBC heavyweight title
37	Win	32–5	Sinan Şamil Sam	UD	12	12 Nov 2005	Alsterdorfer Sporthalle, Hamburg, Germany	Won WBC International heavyweight title
36	Win	31–5	Livin Castillo	TKO	3 (10), 1:30	24 Jun 2005	Etess Arena, Atlantic City, New Jersey, US	
35	Win	30–5	Quinn Navarre	KO	3 (10), 2:47	22 Jan 2005	Coushatta Casino Resort, Kinder, Louisiana, US	
34	Win	29–5	David Defiagbon	SD	10	23 Jul 2004	Etess Arena, Atlantic City, New Jersey, US	
33	Win	28–5	Craig Tomlinson	TKO	2 (10), 1:18	16 Apr 2004	Tropicana Casino & Resort, Atlantic City, New Jersey, US	
32	Win	27–5	Julius Francis	TKO	2 (10)	27 Nov 2003	Olimpiysky Sport Palace, Chekhov, Russia	
31	Win	26–5	Dennis McKinney	TKO	1 (10)	25 Sep 2003	Townhouse, Huntington, New York, US	
30	Win	25–5	Sedreck Fields	TKO	9 (10)	6 Sep 2003	Palace of Sports, Kyiv, Ukraine	
29	Win	24–5	Gary Winmon	TKO	1 (8)	28 Jun 2003	DC Armory, Washington, DC, US	
28	Win	23–5	Errol Sadikovski	TKO	1 (10)	15 Feb 2003	Multi-Purpose Center, Lewiston, Maine, US	
27	Loss	22–5	Corey Sanders	TKO	8 (10), 2:45	17 Mar 2002	Gold Country Casino, Oroville, California, US	
26	Win	22–4	David Vedder	TKO	6 (10), 1:45	30 Nov 2001	Hilton, Reno, Nevada, US	
25	Win	21–4	Brian Nix	TKO	6 (10), 0:53	25 Aug 2001	Flamingo, Laughlin, Nevada, US	
24	Loss	20–4	Lance Whitaker	KO	2 (12), 1:03	10 Mar 2001	Caesars Palace, Paradise, Nevada, US	For WBC Continental Americas heavyweight title
23	Loss	20–3	Kirk Johnson	KO	4 (12), 0:51	7 Oct 2000	Mohegan Sun Arena, Montville, Connecticut, US	Lost PABA heavyweight title
22	Win	20–2	Derrick Jefferson	TKO	4 (10), 2:10	20 May 2000	Bally's Park Place, Atlantic City, New Jersey, US	
21	Win	19–2	Sedreck Fields	RTD	7 (10), 3:00	2 Mar 2000	Ramada Inn, Rosemont, Illinois, US	
20	Win	18–2	Hasim Rahman	KO	8 (10), 0:40	6 Nov 1999	Boardwalk Hall, Atlantic City, New Jersey, US	
19	Win	17–2	Shane Sutcliffe	TKO	2 (12), 2:56	20 May 1999	Grand Casino, Tunica, Mississippi, US	Retained PABA heavyweight title
18	Win	16–2	Jeff Wooden	TKO	3 (12), 0:41	4 Feb 1999	Coeur d'Alene Casino Resort Hotel, Worley, Idaho, US	Retained PABA heavyweight title
17	Win	15–2	Marion Wilson	UD	8	8 Dec 1998	Roseland Ballroom, New York City, New York, US	
16	Win	14–2	Toakipa Tasefa	KO	1 (12), 1:15	2 Oct 1998	Sudduth Coliseum, Lake Charles, Louisiana, US	Won vacant PABA heavyweight title
15	Win	13–2	Courage Tshabalala	KO	9 (10), 2:55	9 Jun 1998	State Circus, Moscow, Russia	
14	Win	12–2	Booker T Word	TKO	4 (10), 2:47	9 Jan 1998	The Claridge, Atlantic City, New Jersey, US	
13	Win	11–2	Alex Stewart	TKO	7 (10)	27 Sep 1997	State Circus, Moscow, Russia	
12	Loss	10–2	David Tua	TKO	11 (12), 1:16	5 Apr 1997	Bally's Park Place, Atlantic City, New Jersey, US	For WBC International heavyweight title
11	Win	10–1	Rodney Blount	KO	2 (6), 1:55	7 Feb 1997	Las Vegas Hilton, Winchester, Nevada, US	
10	Win	9–1	Ralph West	TKO	3 (10), 1:03	12 Sep 1996	Hilton, Huntington, New York, US	
9	Win	8–1	Fernely Feliz	UD	8	20 Aug 1996	Paramount Theater, New York City, New York, US	
8	Win	7–1	Mike Robinson	TKO	7 (8), 1:35	9 Jun 1996	Fernwood Resort, Bushkill, Pennsylvania, US	
7	Loss	6–1	Oliver McCall	TKO	1 (10), 1:38	24 Feb 1996	Coliseum, Richmond, Virginia, US	
6	Win	6–0	Nikolay Kulpin	UD	12	29 Sep 1995	York Hall, London, England	Won PABA heavyweight title
5	Win	5–0	Joe Thomas	PTS	6	25 Aug 1995	Bally's Park Place, Atlantic City, New Jersey, US	
4	Win	4–0	Robert Hawkins	KO	4 (6), 1:05	30 Jun 1995	Convention Center, Philadelphia, Pennsylvania, US	
3	Win	3–0	Mike Whitfield	UD	8	11 Apr 1995	Martin's West, Woodlawn, Maryland, US	
2	Win	2–0	Jimmy Harrison	TKO	4 (6)	4 Mar 1995	The Roxy, Boston, Massachusetts, US	
1	Win	1–0	Alexander Miroshnichenko	TKO	3 (6)	17 Apr 1993	Taraz, Kazakhstan	

Sporting positions
Regional boxing titles
New title	PABA heavyweight champion 29 September 1995 – July 1996; Vacated	Vacant Title next held by Joe Bugner
Vacant Title last held by Joe Bugner	PABA heavyweight champion 2 October 1998 – 7 October 2000; Vacated	Succeeded by Kirk Johnson
Preceded by Sinan Şamil Sam	WBC International heavyweight champion 12 November 2005 – April 2006; Vacated	Vacant Title next held by Sinan Şamil Sam
World boxing titles
Preceded by Hasim Rahman	WBC heavyweight champion 12 August 2006 – 8 March 2008	Succeeded by Samuel Peter
Awards
Previous: Ike Quartey	The Ring Comeback of the Year; 2006	Next: Paulie Malignaggi
