= Jameel McCline =

American boxer (born 1970)

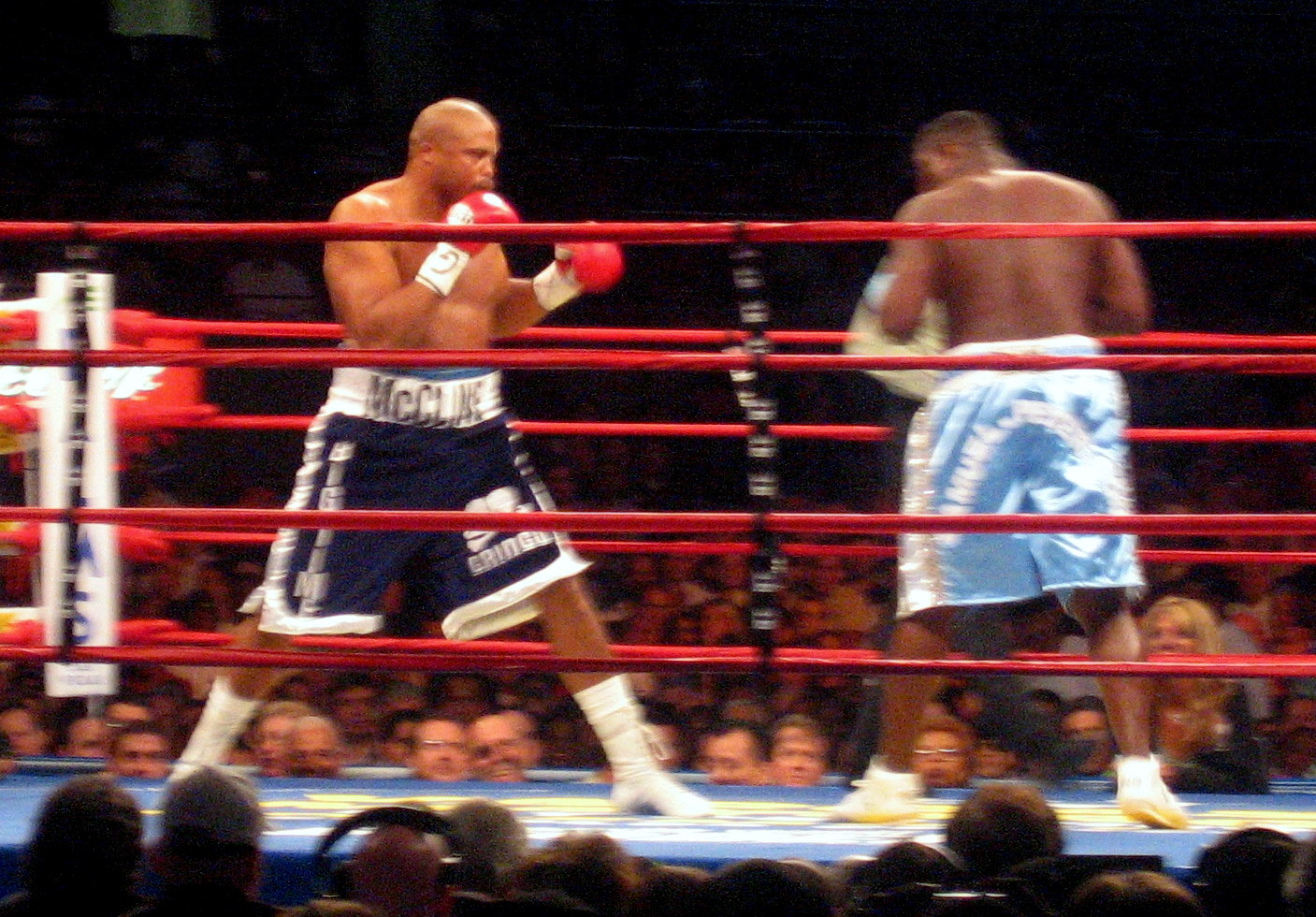
- McCline (left) vs. Samuel Peter, 2007

Personal information
- Nickname: Big Time
- Nationality: American
- Born: May 20, 1970 (age 56) New York City, New York, U.S.
- Height: 6 ft 6 in (198 cm)

Boxing career
- Weight class: Heavyweight
- Reach: 82 in (208 cm)
- Stance: Orthodox

Boxing record
- Total fights: 57
- Wins: 41
- Win by KO: 24
- Losses: 13
- Draws: 3

Jameel McCline (born May 20, 1970) is an American former professional boxer who competed from 1995 to 2012. He challenged for the world heavyweight championship four times; for the WBO title in 2002, IBF title in 2004, and WBA and WBC interim titles in 2007. He holds notable wins over former world champions Al Cole and Shannon Briggs.

== Early life ==
McCline grew up in Harlem, New York City, living in group homes, foster homes, and orphanages where he learned to live independently. Graduating from Comsewogue High School in Port Jefferson Station, New York, McCline spent five years in prison for gun running prior to becoming a professional fighter.

== Professional career ==
Starting at the late age of 25 years and having no amateur experience, McCline took straight to the pro ranks taken part in four world Heavyweight title clashes with Chris Byrd, Wladimir Klitschko, Nikolai Valuev and Samuel Peter, losing all four times. Uniquely, each of these title bouts was for a different version of the world title. He has captured several wins against notable fighters, including Alfred Cole, Michael Grant, Lance Whitaker, Shannon Briggs, Charles Shufford, Cedric Boswell, but has been unable to replicate these performances in title fight situations, although the loss to Chris Byrd was by only one point in a very controversial split decision. Also losing a championship fight in which he had the champion (Sam Peter) down three times during the fight. In addition to the aforementioned title fight losses, he has lost to Greg Pickrom, Calvin Brock and was upset by the underdog Zuri Lawrence in 2005. After which, he went on a six fight win streak that led him back to a World Title fight yet another two times.

On January 20, 2007 McCline challenged WBA heavyweight title holder Nikolai Valuev, in what was the first ever heavyweight title fight on Swiss soil. The fight was also reportedly the "biggest" championship fight in history, with the two fighters having a combined weight of approximately 600 pounds (270 kilograms) on fight night. Valuev was declared the winner by TKO when McCline suffered a patellar tendon rupture of his left knee at the end of the third round while throwing a punch and was unable to continue. At the time of the stoppage McCline was behind on only 1 of the judges scorecards.

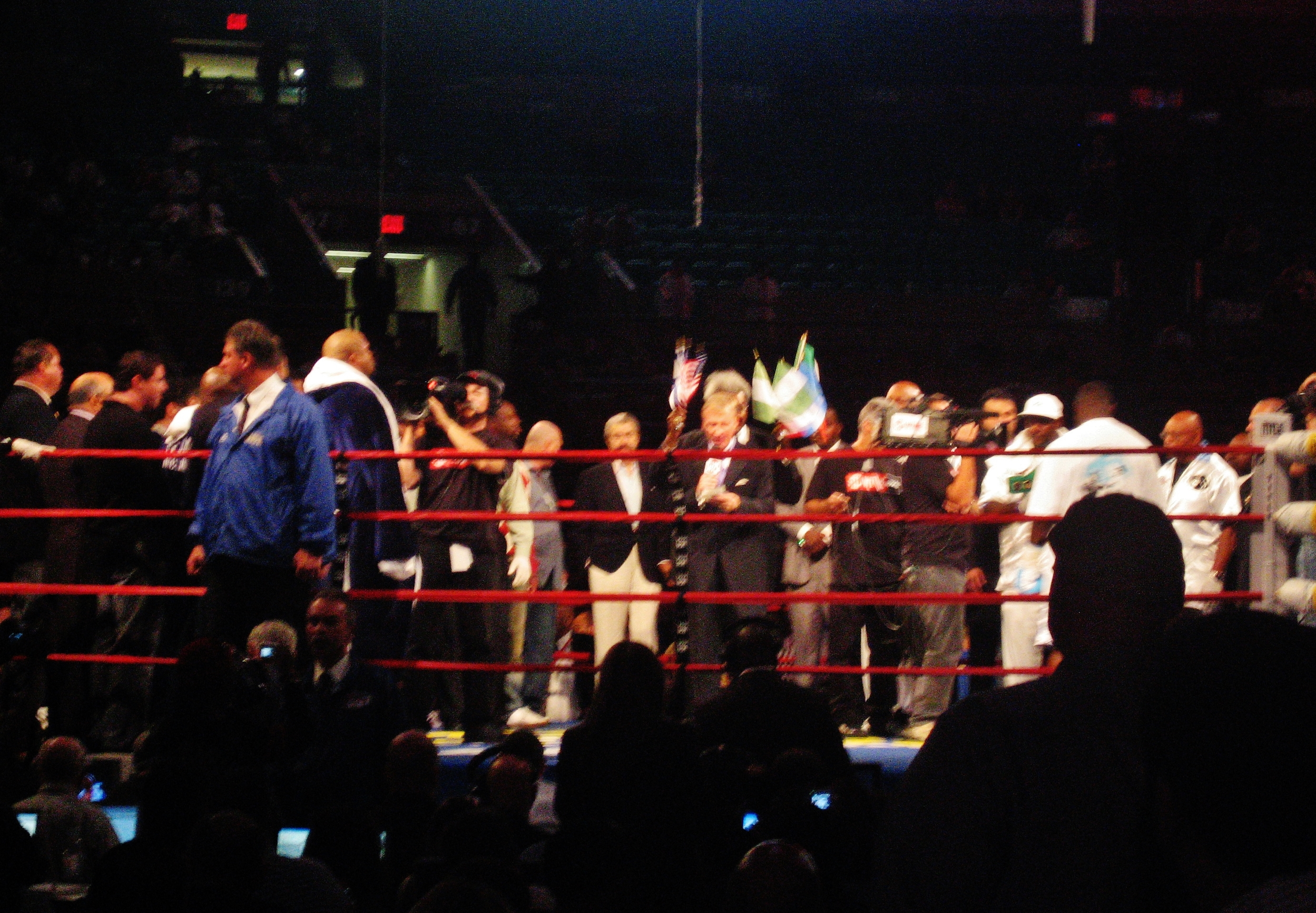
Jimmy Lennon, Jr. making the fighter introductions before the Samuel Peter fight at the Madison Square Garden in October 2007.

McCline was most recently set to face Vitali Klitschko, in the latter's first fight back since retiring from the ring in 2005, but due to an injury Klitschko was forced to pull out, and instead McCline fought Samuel Peter on 6 October 2007 for Peter's WBC Interim title. Despite managing to put Peter on the canvas 3 times in the early rounds of the fight (the first knockdowns of Peter's career) McCline would go on to lose to a controversial unanimous decision on the judges scorecards.

On March 8, 2008 McCline faced former two-time WBA heavyweight title holder John Ruiz in Mexico. McCline lost a unanimous decision in a 12-round scheduled bout.

McCline defeated Mike Mollo by unanimous decision on November 7, 2008.

He fought Chris Arreola on April 11, 2009 on the undercard of the Paul Williams vs. Winky Wright bout but lost the fight by 4th-round knockout.

He made a comeback on December 3, 2011, where he defeated Dennis McKinney by TKO in the 4th round. The venue for the fight was Greensboro Coliseum, Greensboro, North Carolina.

== Professional boxing record ==
57 fights	41 wins	13 losses
By knockout	24	5
By decision	17	8
Draws	3	

No.	Result	Record	Opponent	Type	Round, time	Date	Location	Notes
57	Loss	41-13-3	Magomed Abdusalamov	TKO	2 (10), 1:57	Sep 8, 2012	Olympic Stadium, Moscow, Russia	For vacant WBC–USNBC heavyweight title
56	Loss	41-12-3	Artur Szpilka	UD	10	Jun 30, 2012	Atlas Arena, Łódź, Poland	
55	Win	41-11-3	Livin Castillo	SD	8	Mar 31, 2012	Hamilton Manor, Hamilton Township, New Jersey, U.S.	
54	Loss	40-11-3	Harold Sconiers	MD	8	Feb 3, 2012	Guilford Convention Center, Greensboro, North Carolina, U.S.	
53	Win	40-10-3	Dennis McKinney	TKO	4 (10), 1:45	Dec 3, 2011	Coliseum, Greensboro, North Carolina, U.S.	
52	Loss	39-10-3	Chris Arreola	KO	4 (12), 2:01	Apr 11, 2009	Mandalay Bay Events Center, Las Vegas, Nevada, U.S.	For WBC-NABF and WBC Continental Americas heavyweight titles
51	Win	39-9-3	Mike Mollo	UD	12	Nov 7, 2008	Sichuan Gymnasium, Chengdu, China	
50	Loss	38-9-3	John Ruiz	UD	12	Mar 8, 2008	Plaza de Toros, Cancún, Mexico	
49	Loss	38-8-3	Samuel Peter	UD	12	Oct 6, 2007	Madison Square Garden, New York City, New York, U.S.	For vacant WBC interim heavyweight title
48	Loss	38-7-3	Nikolai Valuev	RTD	3 (12), 3:00	Jan 27, 2007	St. Jakobshalle, Basel, Switzerland	For WBA heavyweight title
47	Win	38-6-3	Terry Smith	UD	10	Jul 21, 2006	Million Dollar Elm Casino, Tulsa, Oklahoma, U.S.	Won vacant WBO-NABO heavyweight title
46	Win	37-6-3	Marcus Rhode	KO	2 (10), 2:40	Jun 2, 2006	Miccosukee Indian Gaming Resort, Miami, Florida, U.S.	
45	Win	36-6-3	Rob Calloway	UD	10	Apr 26, 2006	Buffalo Run Casino, Miami, Florida, U.S.	
44	Win	35-6-3	Marcus McGee	UD	10	Mar 24, 2006	Miccosukee Indian Gaming Resort, Miami, Florida, U.S.	
43	Win	34-6-3	Dan Ward	KO	1 (10), 2:03	Jan 27, 2006	Miccosukee Indian Gaming Resort, Miami, Florida, U.S.	
42	Win	33-6-3	Andy Sample	KO	1 (10), 1:08	Nov 26, 2005	Convention Center, Fort Smith, Arkansas, U.S.	
41	Loss	32-6-3	Zuri Lawrence	UD	10	Oct 21, 2005	Seminole Hard Rock Hotel and Casino, Hollywood, Florida, U.S.	
40	Win	32-5-3	Steve Pannell	KO	3 (10), 2:36	Aug 26, 2005	Seminole Hard Rock Hotel and Casino, Hollywood, Florida, U.S.	
39	Loss	31-5-3	Calvin Brock	UD	10	Apr 15, 2005	Caesars Palace, Las Vegas, Nevada, U.S.	
38	Loss	31-4-3	Chris Byrd	SD	12	Nov 13, 2004	Madison Square Garden, New York City, New York, U.S.	For IBF heavyweight title
37	Win	31-3-3	Wayne Llewellyn	TKO	1 (10), 2:46	Apr 15, 2004	Hammerstein Ballroom, New York City, New York, U.S.	
36	Win	30-3-3	Cedric Boswell	TKO	10 (10), 2:07	Oct 3, 2003	Mandalay Bay Events Center, Las Vegas, Nevada, U.S.	
35	Win	29-3-3	Charles Shufford	TKO	3 (10), 2:39	May 9, 2003	Bally's Park Place Hotel Casino, Atlantic City, New Jersey, U.S.	
34	Loss	28-3-3	Wladimir Klitschko	RTD	10 (12), 3:00	Dec 7, 2002	Mandalay Bay Events Center, Las Vegas, Nevada, U.S.	For WBO heavyweight title
33	Win	28-2-3	Shannon Briggs	UD	10	Apr 27, 2002	Madison Square Garden, New York City, New York, U.S.	
32	Win	27-2-3	Lance Whitaker	UD	12	Dec 1, 2001	Jacob Javits Center, New York City, New York, U.S.	Won WBC Continental Americas heavyweight title
31	Win	26-2-3	Michael Grant	TKO	1 (10), 0:43	Jul 21, 2001	Caesars Palace, Las Vegas, Nevada, U.S.	
30	Win	25-2-3	Alfred Cole	UD	10	Jun 25, 2001	Scope Arena, Norfolk, Virginia, U.S.	
29	Win	24-2-3	King Ipitan	TKO	1 (10), 2:59	Jan 24, 2001	Hard Rock Hotel and Casino, Las Vegas, Nevada, U.S.	
28	Win	23-2-3	Reynaldo Minus	UD	8	Sep 14, 2000	Hammerstein Ballroom, New York City, New York, U.S.	
27	Win	22-2-3	Sedreck Fields	UD	10	Jul 27, 2000	Hammerstein Ballroom, New York City, New York, U.S.	
26	Draw	21-2-3	Sherman Williams	MD	10	Jun 29, 2000	Hammerstein Ballroom, New York City, New York, U.S.	
25	Win	21-2-2	Eddie Richardson	UD	8	Mar 31, 2000	Hammerstein Ballroom, New York City, New York, U.S.	
24	Draw	20-2-2	Ron Guerrero	SD	8	Jan 27, 2000	Hammerstein Ballroom, New York City, New York, U.S.	
23	Win	20-2-1	Jimmy Haynes	TKO	3 (10)	Sep 14, 1999	Yonkers Raceway, Yonkers, New York, U.S.	
22	Win	19-2-1	Harry Daniels	PTS	6	Jun 24, 1999	Atlanta, Georgia, U.S.	
21	Win	18-2-1	Garing Lane	UD	8	Mar 27, 1999	Jai Alai Fronton, Miami, Florida, U.S.	
20	Win	17-2-1	Bryant Smith	SD	8	Dec 4, 1998	Coliseum, Greensboro, North Carolina, U.S.	
19	Win	16-2-1	Mike Dixon	TKO	1 (?)	Nov 4, 1998	Virginia Beach, Virginia, U.S.	
18	Win	15-2-1	Guy Sonnenberg	TKO	5 (6)	Sep 24, 1998	Roxy Theater, Atlanta, Georgia, U.S.	
17	Win	14-2-1	Kimmuel Odum	KO	4 (?)	Aug 27, 1998	Roxy Theater, Atlanta, Georgia, U.S.	
16	Win	13-2-1	Shane Hykes	KO	2 (?)	Jul 30, 1998	Roxy Theater, Atlanta, Georgia, U.S.	
15	Win	12-2-1	Carlton Davis	KO	1 (6)	Jun 25, 1998	Roxy Theater, Atlanta, Georgia, U.S.	
14	Win	11-2-1	Floyd Womack	TKO	2 (6), 2:51	Apr 4, 1998	Sons Of Italy, Lake Worth, Florida, U.S.	
13	Win	10-2-1	Robert Colay	TKO	5 (6), 0:59	Mar 21, 1998	National Guard Armory, Charlotte, North Carolina, U.S.	
12	Win	9-2-1	Marcus Harden	UD	4	Feb 25, 1998	The Ritz, Raleigh, North Carolina, U.S.	
11	Win	8-2-1	Frankie Hines	KO	1 (?)	Jan 29, 1998	Richmond, Virginia, U.S.	
10	Win	7-2-1	Rowyan Wallace	KO	2 (?)	Nov 1, 1997	Apollo Theater, New York City, New York, U.S.	
9	Win	6-2-1	Charles Cue	UD	6	Sep 27, 1997	Steve Shepherd Boxing Gym, Riviera Beach, Florida, U.S.	
8	Win	5-2-1	Curt Paige	UD	4	Jul 15, 1997	Riverside Convention Center, Rochester, New York, U.S.	
7	Win	4-2-1	Mark Whittaker	TKO	3 (4)	May 5, 1997	Harrah's Marina Hotel Casino, Atlantic City, New Jersey, U.S.	
6	Win	3-2-1	Charlie Brazell	KO	1 (?), 1:10	Aug 21, 1996	The Ritz, Raleigh, North Carolina, U.S.	
5	Loss	2-2-1	Greg Pickrom	SD	8	Apr 12, 1996	Fernwood Resort, Bushkill, Pennsylvania, U.S.	
4	Draw	2-1-1	Albert Williams	MD	4	Mar 15, 1996	Convention Hall, Atlantic City, New Jersey, U.S.	
3	Win	2–1	Dwayne Evans	KO	1 (4), 1:48	Feb 9, 1996	Tropworld Casino and Entertainment Resort, Atlantic City, New Jersey, U.S.	
2	Loss	1–1	Gary Bell	KO	1 (?)	Nov 18, 1995	Convention Hall, Atlantic City, New Jersey, U.S.	
1	Win	1–0	Brian Nix	TKO	1 (?), 2:41	Oct 10, 1995	Blue Cross Arena, Rochester, New York, U.S.	

Sporting positions
Regional boxing titles
Preceded by Lance Whitaker	WBC Continental Americas heavyweight champion December 1, 2001 – December 2002; Vacated	Vacant Title next held by Lamon Brewster
Vacant Title last held by Shannon Briggs	NABO heavyweight champion July 21, 2006 – May 2007; Vacated	Vacant Title next held by Josué Blocus
