= Lance Whitaker =

American boxer

Personal information
- Nicknames: Mount; Goofi
- Born: May 29, 1972 (age 54) Granada Hills, Los Angeles, California, U.S.
- Height: 6 ft 8 in (203 cm)
- Weight: Heavyweight

Boxing career
- Reach: 84 in (213 cm)
- Stance: Orthodox

Boxing record
- Total fights: 43
- Wins: 35
- Win by KO: 28
- Losses: 7
- Draws: 1
Medal record
Men's boxing
Representing United States
Goodwill Games
Silver medal – second place	1994 Saint Petersburg	Super heavyweight
Pan American Games
Bronze medal – third place	1995 Mar del Plata	Super heavyweight

Lance Whitaker (born May 29, 1971) is an American former professional boxer. As an amateur in the super heavyweight division, he won a bronze medal at the 1995 Pan American Games. Nicknamed "Mount", or more recently "Goofi", Whitaker was known for his size – 6 feet, 8 inches – and personability.

== Early life ==
A native of Granada Hills, Los Angeles, Whitaker attended San Fernando High School, where he played football and basketball. In 1989, he was convinced to start boxing by local trainer Francisco Ortega, who spotted him while he was waiting in line at a Burger King restaurant.

== Amateur career ==
Whitaker won the National Golden Gloves Super Heavyweight title in 1993, followed by the United States (AAU) National Amateur Super Heavyweight title in 1994.

(gold) National Golden Gloves, Little Rock, Arkansas, May 1993:

- 1/4: Defeated Marcus Johnson
- 1/2: Defeated Levone Seegars KO 1
- Finals: Defeated Ed Mahone PTS

U.S. Olympic Festival, San Antonio, Texas, July–August 1993:

- Finals: Lost to Reginald Blackmon 9–18

(gold) United States National Championships, 1994:

- Finals: Defeated Robert Geer PTS

(silver) Goodwill Games, Saint Petersburg, Russia, July 1994:

- 1/2: Defeated Erik Fuhrmann (Germany) 21–3
- Finals: Lost to Alexei Lezin (Russia) 0–17

U.S. Pan Am Trials, Portland, Oregon, January 1995:

- 1/2: Defeated Ed Mahone 32–21
- Finals: Defeated Alvin Manley 25–13

(bronze) Giraldo Córdova Cardín, Matanzas, Cuba, February 1995:

- 1/4: Defeated Roberto Camilo (Cuba) 13–9
- 1/2: Lost to Pedro Carrión (Cuba) by walkover

(bronze) Pan American Games, Mar del Plata, Argentina, March 1995:

- 1/4: Defeated Andrew Stewart (Grenada) by walkover
- 1/2: Lost to Leonardo Martinez Fizz (Cuba) KO 1

United States National Championships, Colorado Springs, Colorado, February 1996:

- Finals: Lost to Lawrence Clay-Bey RSC 3

U.S. Olympic Box-Offs, 1996:

- Day 1: Lost to T. J. Wilson PTS
- Day 2: Lost to Charles Shufford

== Professional career ==
Whitaker turned pro in 1996 and quickly climbed the rankings with knockout wins over limited competition. A win over faded contender Alex Stewart landed him a fight against Lou Savarese in 1999. Savarese ended Whitaker's 18 fight unbeaten streak with a decision win. Whitaker then went on later that year to hand Monte Barrett his first loss and in 2000 knocked out undefeated Robert Davis. Whitaker then scored a devastating KO victory over contender Oleg Maskaev 2001, perhaps the biggest win of his career. At this point Whitaker was seen by many as having the potential to be a future heavyweight champion. Unfortunately for Whitaker, he lost his next fight to Jameel McCline by unanimous decision. He then drifted into journeyman obscurity, and was knocked out by Luan Krasniqi in 2005. In 2006 Whitaker lost to Sultan Ibragimov by knockout, effectively putting an end to his hope for future title belt opportunities. Whitaker continues to fight, but hasn't been highly ranked as a heavyweight in several years.

== Nickname ==
Whitaker is likely most known for his bizarre adoption of the "Goofi" nickname prior to his fight with McCline in 2001. Whitaker's popularity was skyrocketing in boxing circles, and his promoter, the infamous Rock Newman, concocted the stunt to generate publicity and sentiment towards Whitaker.

== Professional boxing record ==
35 Wins (28 knockouts, 7 decisions), 7 Losses (3 knockouts, 4 decisions), 1 No Contest
Result	Opp; Record	Opponent	Type	Round	Date	Location	Notes
Loss	12-2-2	(United States) Franklin Lawrence	KO	7	11/09/2010	(United States) Riverside, California, U.S.	IBO Intercontinental Heavyweight Title.. Lawrence knocked out at 2:59 of the seventh round.
Win	21-1	(Russia) Andrey Fedosov	SD	12	12/06/2010	(United States) Hollywood, California, U.S.	
Loss	53-9	(United States) Oliver McCall	UD	10	23/10/2009	(United States) Las Vegas, Nevada, U.S.	
Win	20-8-2	(United Kingdom) Mathew Ellis	TKO	1	21/08/2009	(United States) Redondo Beach, California, U.S.	WBC USNBC Heavyweight Title.. Referee stopped the bout at 1:39 of the first round after Ellis had been knocked down thrice.
Win	25-6-1	(United States) Danny Batchelder	UD	10	17/07/2009	(United States) Redondo Beach, California, U.S.	
Loss	11-1	(United States) Jason Estrada	UD	10	04/04/2008	(United States) Lincoln, Rhode Island, U.S.	
Win	22-24	(United States) Ron Johnson	TKO	1	23/02/2008	(United States) Russellville, Arkansas, U.S.	Referee stopped the fight at 0:51 of the first round.
Loss	18-0	(Russia) Sultan Ibragimov	TKO	7	15/12/2005	(United States) Hollywood, Florida, U.S.	WBO Asia Pacific Heavyweight Title.. Referee stopped the bout at 2:01 of the seventh round.
Win	17-5-1	(United States) Gabe Brown	TKO	5	Oct 1, 2005	(United States) Tampa, Florida, U.S.	Referee stopped the bout at 2:42 of the fifth round.
Win	14-30-4	(United States) Louis Monaco	TKO	3	26/08/2005	(United States) Hollywood, Florida, U.S.	Referee stopped the bout at 0:30 of the third round.
Loss	27-1-1	(Germany) Luan Krasniqi	KO	6	28/05/2005	Stuttgart, Germany	Whitaker knocked out at 2:06 of the sixth round.
Win	22-15-1	(United States) Otis Tisdale	TKO	1	05/08/2004	(United States) Hollywood, Florida, U.S.	Referee stopped the bout at 2:20 of the first round.
Win	20-1-1	(Nigeria) Friday Ahunanya	TKO	5	17/04/2004	(United States) Tampa, Florida, U.S.	NABA/WBO NABO Heavyweight Title. Referee stopped the bout at 0:42 of the fifth round.
Win	34-11-3	(United States) Al Cole	UD	12	30/10/2003	(United States) Coconut Creek, Florida, U.S.	NABA Heavyweight Title.
Win	20-6	(United States) Russell Chasteen	TKO	2	28/06/2003	(United States) Coconut Creek, Florida, U.S.	Referee stopped the bout at 1:57 of the second round.
Win	23-7-2	(United States) Cliff Couser	KO	5	13/10/2002	(United States) Choctaw, Mississippi, U.S.	Couser knocked out at 2:45 of the fifth round.
Draw	16-3	(United States) Ray Austin	SD	10	13/04/2002	(United States) Chester, West Virginia, U.S.	
Win	13-13-1	(United States) Willie Chapman	TKO	4	01/02/2002	(United States) Phoenix, Arizona, U.S.	Referee stopped the bout at 2:21 of the fourth round.
Loss	26-2-3	(United States) Jameel McCline	UD	12	01/12/2001	(United States) New York City, U.S.	WBC Continental Americas Heavyweight Title.
Win	20-3	(Uzbekistan) Oleg Maskaev	KO	2	10/03/2001	(United States) Las Vegas, Nevada, U.S.	WBC Continental Americas Heavyweight Title. Maskaev knocked out at 1:03 of the second round.
Win	22-0	(United States) Robert Davis	TKO	2	07/10/2000	(United States) Uncasville, Connecticut, U.S.	Referee stopped the bout at 2:29 of the second round.
Win	21-3-2	(United States) David Dixon	DQ	1	21/07/2000	(United States) Las Vegas, Nevada, U.S.	Referee stopped the bout due to repeated low blows from Dixon.
Win	26-8	(United States) Thomas Williams	TKO	2	11/06/2000	(United States) Concho, Oklahoma, U.S.	WBC Continental Americas Heavyweight Title. Referee stopped the bout at 2:20 of the second round.
Win	21-0	(United States) Monte Barrett	SD	12	28/08/1999	(United States) Las Vegas, Nevada, U.S.	WBC Continental Americas Heavyweight Title.
Loss	38-2	(United States) Lou Savarese	SD	10	06/03/1999	(United States) Atlantic City, New Jersey, U.S.	Savarese took a knee in the sixth round.
Win	38-2	(Jamaica) Alex Stewart	TKO	7	16/01/1999	(United States) Las Vegas, Nevada, U.S.	Referee stopped the bout at 1:40 of the seventh round.
Win	10-1	(United States) Jason Yarosz	TKO	2	08/10/1998	(United States) Kansas City, Missouri, U.S.	Referee stopped the bout at 2:09 of the second round.
Win	4-1	(United States) Ray Butler	TKO	6	01/05/1998	(United States) San Antonio, Texas, U.S.	Referee stopped the bout at 1:29 of the sixth round.
Win	16-14-2	(United States) Garing Lane	UD	8	27/03/1998	(United States) Atlantic City, New Jersey, U.S.	
Win	20-20-1	(United States) Everett Martin	UD	8	27/02/1998	(United States) Studio City, California, U.S.	Referee stopped the bout at 1:29 of the sixth round.
Win	11-2	(United States) Joe Ballard	TKO	1	16/01/1998	(United States) Atlantic City, New Jersey, U.S.	Referee stopped the bout at 2:49 of the first round.
Win	26-18-1	(United States) Eddie Gonzales	TKO	1	13/12/1997	(United States) Northlake, Illinois, U.S.	Referee stopped the bout at 2:55 of the first round.
Win	20-6	(United States) Marcus Rhode	TKO	2	14/11/1997	(United States) South Padre Island, Texas, U.S.	Referee stopped the bout at 0:51 of the second round.
Win	10-0	(United States) Larry Menefee	TKO	2	17/10/1997	(United States) Phoenix, Arizona, U.S.	Referee stopped the bout at 1:11 of the second round.
Win	10-5	(United States) Isaac Brown	TKO	1	09/08/1997	(United States) South Padre Island, Texas, U.S.	Referee stopped the bout at 1:59 of the first round.
Win	3-1-1	(United States) Muhammed Raheem	KO	1	19/07/1997	(United States) Indio, California, U.S.	
Win	8-0-1	(United States) Jerriel Bazile	TKO	3	05/07/1997	(United States) Moline, Illinois, U.S.	Referee stopped the bout at 2:10 of the third round.
Win	1-1	(United States) Orlando Leavall	KO	2	25/02/1997	(United States) Long Beach, California, U.S.	
Win	1-8-1	(United States) Marco Dickson	KO	2	17/01/1997	(United States) Los Angeles, California, U.S.	
Win	1-4	(United States) Ricardo Phillips	KO	2	03/12/1996	(United States) Indio, California, U.S.	
Win	1-4	(United States) Ricardo Phillips	KO	2	03/12/1996	(United States) Indio, California, U.S.	
Win	6-7	(United States) Dion Burgess	KO	1	21/11/1996	(United States) Los Angeles, California, U.S.	
Win	3-6-1	(Mexico) Mario Osuna	TKO	1	16/09/1996	(United States) Las Vegas, Nevada, U.S.	
Win	2-2	(United States) John Keyes	KO	1	10/07/1996	(United States) Beverly Hills, California, U.S.	

Preceded by Jo-el Scott	United States Amateur Super Heavyweight Champion; 1994	Succeeded by Lawrence Clay-Bey
