= Travis Fulton =

American boxer and mixed martial artist (1977–2021)

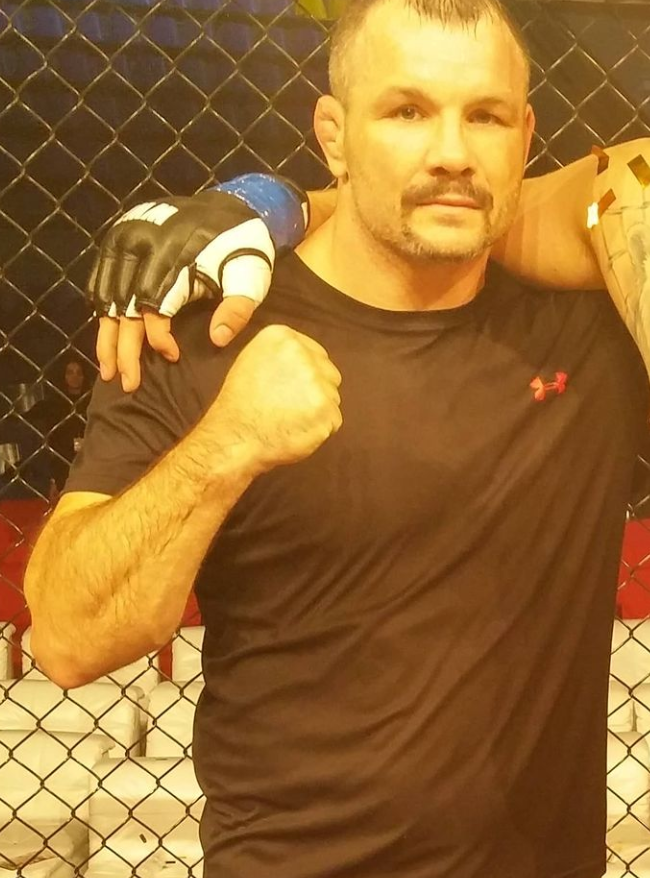
- Born: May 29, 1977; Waterloo, Iowa, U.S.
- Died: July 10, 2021 (aged 44); Cedar Rapids, Iowa, U.S.
- Other names: The Ironman
- Height: 6 ft 0 in (183 cm)
- Weight: 258 lb (117 kg; 18.4 st)
- Division: Heavyweight (265 lb)
- Style: Boxing
- Stance: Orthodox
- Fighting out of: Cedar Falls, Iowa
- Trainer: 18
- Rank: 2nd Dan black belt in American Kenpo
- Years active: 1996–2021 (MMA); 1999–2021 (boxing); 2019–2021 (bare-knuckle boxing)

Professional boxing record
- Total: 75
- Wins: 25
- By knockout: 23
- Losses: 48
- By knockout: 33
- Draws: 2

Mixed martial arts record
- Total: 322
- Wins: 257
- By knockout: 142
- By submission: 107
- By decision: 8
- Losses: 54
- By knockout: 13
- By submission: 26
- By decision: 14
- By disqualification: 1
- Draws: 10
- No contests: 1

Other information
- Boxing record from BoxRec
- Mixed martial arts record from Sherdog

Travis Fulton (May 29, 1977 – July 10, 2021) was an American mixed martial artist, a professional boxer in the heavyweight division of both sports, and a convicted CSAM offender. Known as a longtime veteran in mixed martial arts, he competed in over 300 sanctioned bouts and while he was perhaps best known for competing in smaller US-based promotions, he also competed in the UFC, the USWF, the WEC, Pancrase, M-1 Global, the Chicago Red Bears of the IFL, King of the Cage, RINGS, and Oktagon MMA. He also holds the record for the most sanctioned mixed martial arts bouts, with 320 bouts; in addition to that, he also holds the most wins in mixed martial arts history (255).

== Background ==
Fulton was born in Waterloo, Iowa and raised in Cedar Falls, Iowa. His father worked for the John Deere company and was eventually laid off, sending the family to deep poverty. In school, Fulton was seriously bullied, up to a point where he contrived a plan to kill his tormentors and subsequently himself. However, success in multiple sports made him popular: Fulton began wrestling when he was in elementary school, following his older brother's footsteps. Fulton was also a skilled baseball player and later attended Cedar Falls High School, where he was a state competitor in wrestling, but was kicked off the team several times for skipping classes. He was also a Golden Gloves boxer and a second-degree black belt in American Kenpo. Fulton fell in love with the sport of mixed martial arts after seeing UFC 3 on pay per view. At the age of 18, Fulton took up submission fighting and later trained with Miletich Fighting Systems led by legendary coach and fellow Iowa native Pat Miletich.

== Mixed martial arts career ==
Fulton has fought more documented MMA matches than any other fighter, racking up over 300 fights in just over 15 years. He debuted on July 26, 1996, when he was 19 years old against Dave Strasser in an event entitled "Gladiators". He lost by submission via a rear naked choke. Within just over two years of his debut, he had fought 50 Vale Tudo fights including five fights across two tournaments in one month in September 1997, compiling a record of 37-11-2 in that span. He won the World Vale Tudo Heavyweight Championship at a Tournament in Brazil in 1998.

Fulton fought over 40 professional mixed martial Arts bouts in 1998 alone. He won 10 tournaments including the prestigious WVC in Brazil.

Fulton also defeated undefeated Super Brawl champion Kawika Pa'alhui in Hawaii in August 1998. He fought to a draw against Ikuhisa Minowa in Japan in October 1998.

By early 1999, at just 22 years old, Fulton was recognized as one of the top young Vale Tudo fighters in the United States and was invited to fight at UFC 20, where he lost to Pete Williams by submission via an armbar. He returned at UFC 21, defeating David Dodd via a unanimous decision, though it was his last time fighting in the UFC.

Fulton was scheduled to compete in UFC 23 against Scott Adams, but was sidelined with a broken hand just six days prior to the event.

In 2008, Fulton was chosen to appear in The Ultimate Fighter reality series, but was unable to make weight in time for filming.

While posting a winning record 2001-05 were dogged by losses to up-and-coming fighters that went on to become top-level UFC fighters, such as Andrei Arlovski, Renato Sobral, Ricco Rodriguez, Evan Tanner, Dan Severn, Rich Franklin, Forrest Griffin, Ian Freeman, Jeremy Horn, Branden Lee Hinkle, and Ben Rothwell.

Fulton has thrived in many MMA organizations. He won the International Fighting Championships (IFC) world title 3 times, and has also won 3 tournaments in the organization. His only IFC losses were to Matt Lindland by choke at 22:13 (although Fulton submitted Lindland via armbar submission less than 2 minutes into their fight, but Lindland protested and Fulton agreed to continue the match) and Vladimir Matyushenko by neck crank at 15:33.

Fulton competed in the main event of World Extreme Cagefighting's debut event in June 2001 and lost a decision to UFC Hall of Famer Dan Severn.

Fulton returned to compete in IFL Chicago in May 2007 when he took on IFL Heavyweight Champion Ben Rothwell. Fulton took the fight on a week's notice, but gave Rothwell his greatest challenge to date in the IFL organization before losing via kimura in round 2.

Fulton fought former UFC Heavyweight Champion Andrei Arlovski at ProElite 2 in November 2011 and lost via a head kick KO with only one second remaining in the fight. The bout served as the co-main event.

Fulton was the #1 ranked heavyweight in Iowa for nearly a decade. He formerly held the Iowa Challenge, Cedar Valley Fighting Championships, and ISKA Mid West Muay Thai Heavyweight Championship titles.

On April 4, 2019, in Fulton's last fight, he captured the M-1 Global Super Fight World title when he defeated Shannon Ritch in Winterhaven, California by forearm choke. Fulton holds the record for the most mixed martial arts fights in history. Shannon Ritch is second only to Fulton in number of mixed martial arts fights.

=== ISCF - International Sport Combat Federation ===
Fulton won the ISCF Pro Super Heavyweight United States Title on August 8, 1999, in Tempe, Arizona, when he defeated Dan Chase by knockout at :40 of round 1.

=== Iowa Challenge ===
In August 2012, Fulton competed at Iowa Challenge 69, facing Brad Scholten. He won the fight via split decision. After being inactive from MMA, Fulton returned to face Ryan Scheeper at Iowa Challenge 80 in March 2013, which he won by submission strikes. Fulton returned to Iowa Challenge in August 2013, where he faced Blake Breitspreacher, and won by TKO.

== Boxing career ==
In parallel to his MMA career, Fulton also boxed professionally since 1999, mainly in the Midwestern circuit, often serving as a trial horse for up-and coming fighters such as Tye Fields, Chris Koval, Brian Minto, David Rodriguez, Albert Sosnowski, Chauncy Welliver, Travis Walker, Alonzo Butler, and Steve Collins (not the famous Irish boxer). While not as prolific as his MMA career, he has had 75 professional boxing matches, racking up a record of 25 wins against 48 losses and 2 draws, with twenty-three of his wins coming by way of knockout.

== Personal life ==
Fulton lived alone in rural Iowa and had one child. He wrote his autobiography in 2017 which has not been published.

=== Death ===
While in custody for child pornography charges, Fulton, age 44, was found dead by deputies at the Linn County Jail on the morning of July 10, 2021. The cause of death was suicide by hanging. The Sheriff of Linn County later reported his autopsy cause of death as strangulation.

== Championships and accomplishments ==
- M-1 Global
  - M-1 Global Super Fight World Champion
- International Sport Combat Federation
  - ISCF Pro Super Heavyweight US Champion
- International Fighting Championship
  - IFC 8 Tournament Winner
  - IFC Extreme Combat Tournament Winner
  - IFC 6 Tournament Runner Up
- World Vale Tudo Championship
  - WVC 6 Tournament Winner

== Mixed martial arts record ==
Professional record breakdown
| 320 matches | 255 wins | 54 losses |
| By knockout | 143 | 13 |
| By submission | 104 | 26 |
| By decision | 8 | 14 |
| By disqualification | 0 | 1 |
| Draws | 10 | |
| No contests | 1 | |

| Res. | Record | Opponent | Method | Event | Date | Round | Time | Location | Notes |
|---|---|---|---|---|---|---|---|---|---|
| Win | 255–54–10 (1) | Shannon Ritch | Submission (forearm choke) | M-1 Global: Road to M-1 USA 2 | April 4, 2019 | 2 | 0:41 | Winterhaven, California, United States | Wins M-1 Global Super Fight World Championship. |
| Win | 254–54–10 (1) | Johnathan Ivey | TKO (retirement) | Colosseum Combat 45 | June 30, 2018 | 1 | 3:50 | Kokomo, Indiana, United States | |
| Loss | 253–54–10 (1) | Attila Végh | Submission (arm-triangle choke) | Oktagon 4: Challenge Finals 2 | November 12, 2017 | 1 | 3:23 | Bratislava, Slovakia | |
| Loss | 253–53–10 (1) | Serghei Spivac | Submission (rear-naked choke) | World Warriors Fighting Championship 7 | June 14, 2017 | 1 | 2:50 | Kyiv, Ukraine | For the WWFC Heavyweight Championship |
| Loss | 253–52–10 (1) | Admir Bogucanin | Submission (north-south choke) | Superior Fighting Championship 16 | March 11, 2017 | 1 | 0:46 | Darmstadt, Hesse, Germany | |
| Win | 253–51–10 (1) | Brad Scholten | Decision (unanimous) | VFC - Fight Night Waterloo | May 7, 2016 | 3 | 5:00 | Waterloo, Iowa, United States | |
| Win | 252–51–10 (1) | John Reed | TKO (punches) | Iowa Challenge 122 | January 9, 2016 | 1 | 0:48 | Waterloo, Iowa, United States | |
| Loss | 251–51–10 (1) | Lechi Kurbanov | TKO (doctor stoppage) | WFCA 9 - Grozny Battle | October 4, 2015 | 1 | 5:00 | Grozny, Russia | |
| Loss | 251–50–10 (1) | Alexei Kudin | TKO (punches) | Russian MMA Union - New Horizons Grand Final | November 22, 2014 | 1 | 1:34 | Minsk, Belarus | |
| Win | 251–49–10 (1) | DaVonta Nunn | Submission (armbar) | Iowa Challenge 100 | March 29, 2014 | 1 | 1:01 | Waterloo, Iowa, United States | |
| Win | 250–49–10 (1) | Blake Breitsprecher | TKO (punches) | Iowa Challenge 89 | August 17, 2013 | 1 | 1:39 | Waterloo, Iowa, United States | |
| Win | 249–49–10 (1) | Ryan Scheeper | TKO (Submission to punches) | Iowa Challenge 80 | March 9, 2013 | 1 | 0:30 | Waterloo, Iowa, United States | |
| Win | 248–49–10 (1) | Brad Scholten | Decision (split) | Iowa Challenge 69 | August 18, 2012 | 3 | 5:00 | Waterloo, Iowa, United States | |
| Loss | 247–49–10 (1) | Andrei Arlovski | KO (head kick) | ProElite II: Big Guns | November 5, 2011 | 3 | 4:59 | Moline, Illinois, United States | |
| Win | 247–48–10 (1) | Michael Smith | KO (head kick) | Iowa Challenge 63 | October 22, 2011 | 1 | 1:19 | Waterloo, Iowa, United States | |
| Win | 246–48–10 (1) | Jesse Nunez | Submission (forearm choke) | Iowa Challenge 63 | June 4, 2011 | 1 | 1:47 | Cedar Rapids, Iowa, United States | |
| Win | 245–48–10 (1) | John McElroy | Submission (triangle choke) | Iowa Challenge 63 | March 19, 2011 | 1 | 4:20 | Waterloo, Iowa, United States | |
| Win | 244–48–10 (1) | Waylon Goldsmith | TKO (punches) | Iowa Challenge 62 | January 22, 2011 | 1 | 0:27 | Waterloo, Iowa, United States | |
| Loss | 243–48–10 (1) | Jeff Monson | Submission (kimura) | Elite Promotions / Fight Time Promotions: Fight Time 2 | October 23, 2010 | 1 | 4:40 | Pompano Beach, Florida, United States | |
| Loss | 243–47–10 (1) | Justin Newcomb | TKO (punches) | Fury Fights | October 2, 2010 | 1 | 1:11 | Watertown, South Dakota, United States | |
| Win | 243–46–10 (1) | Preston Shane | KO (punches) | TP: Calm Before the Storm | September 16, 2010 | 2 | 0:57 | Waterloo, Iowa, United States | |
| Loss | 242–46–10 (1) | Ricco Rodriguez | KO (head kick) | Cage Thug | May 1, 2010 | 1 | N/A | Waterloo, Iowa, United States | |
| Win | 242–45–10 (1) | Brad Kohler | KO (head kick) | CFX / XKL: Mayhem in Minneapolis | April 24, 2010 | 1 | 1:01 | Minneapolis, Minnesota, United States | |
| Win | 241–45–10 (1) | Blake Breitsprecher | Submission (rear-naked choke) | Cage Thug | March 26, 2010 | 1 | 0:45 | Evansdale, Iowa, United States | |
| Win | 240–45–10 (1) | Bob Breshears | Submission (armbar) | Cage Thug | March 6, 2010 | 2 | 0:30 | Cedar Rapids, Iowa, United States | |
| Win | 239–45–10 (1) | Anton Tomash | KO (punch) | CVFA: Friday Night Fights | March 5, 2010 | 2 | 0:15 | Newton, Iowa, United States | |
| Win | 238–45–10 (1) | Anton Tomash | Submission (armbar) | Cage Thug | February 27, 2010 | 1 | 2:50 | Union, Iowa, United States | |
| Win | 237–45–10 (1) | James Neely | Submission (armbar) | TP – Alabama Pride: Iowa vs. Alabama | February 5, 2010 | 1 | N/A | Pelham, Alabama, United States | |
| Win | 236–45–10 (1) | Matt Brenner | KO (punches) | CVFA: Amateur War Zone | January 30, 2010 | 2 | 0:53 | Dubuque, Iowa, United States | |
| Win | 235–45–10 (1) | Anthony Clark | KO (punches) | CVFA: Rage in the Cage 2 | January 29, 2010 | 1 | 0:58 | Waterloo, Iowa, United States | |
| Win | 234–45–10 (1) | Jesse Nunez | Submission (armbar) | Cage Thug | January 23, 2010 | 1 | 2:03 | Cedar Rapids, Iowa, United States | |
| Win | 233–45–10 (1) | Robert Casey | KO (punches) | Cage Thug | December 31, 2009 | 2 | N/A | West Union, Iowa, United States | |
| Win | 232–45–10 (1) | Willie Johnson | TKO (retirement) | Cage Thug | December 19, 2009 | 2 | 3:00 | Waterloo, Iowa, United States | |
| Win | 231–45–10 (1) | Steven Morlock | Submission (armbar) | CVFA: Rage in the Cage | November 28, 2009 | 2 | 1:40 | Waterloo, Iowa, United States | |
| Win | 230–45–10 (1) | Abraham Garcia | TKO (doctor stoppage) | CVFA: Rumble in Hills | September 12, 2009 | 1 | 1:14 | Hills, Iowa, United States | |
| Win | 229–45–10 (1) | Jeff Flanagan | TKO (punches) | Thunder in the Sand | September 5, 2009 | 2 | N/A | Conesville, Iowa, United States | |
| Win | 228–45–10 (1) | Austin Sisson | KO (punches) | Iowa Challenge 53: Kickfest in the Cage | August 15, 2009 | 2 | 0:12 | Iowa, United States | |
| Win | 227–45–10 (1) | Tony Crawford | Submission (rear-naked choke) | MFC 8: Ultimate Outlaws | August 14, 2009 | 1 | 1:12 | Iowa, United States | |
| Win | 226–45–10 (1) | Dylan Sherman | KO (head kick) | CVFA: Season's Beatings | December 27, 2008 | 2 | 0:10 | Waterloo, Iowa, United States | |
| Win | 225–45–10 (1) | Jamie Klair | KO (punches) | TCI: Season's Beatings | December 20, 2008 | 1 | 0:21 | Sioux Falls, South Dakota, United States | |
| Win | 224–45–10 (1) | Preston Shane | Submission (rear-naked choke) | CVFA: Rumble on the Rock 2 | December 13, 2008 | 3 | N/A | Steamboat Rock, Iowa, United States | |
| Win | 223–45–10 (1) | Dylan Sherman | Submission (rear-naked choke) | IC 49: Kickfest | October 25, 2008 | 1 | 2:42 | Waterloo, Iowa, United States | |
| Win | 222–45–10 (1) | Bryan Robinson | Submission (kimura) | TCI: Fight Hunger | October 17, 2008 | 1 | 2:24 | Sioux Falls, South Dakota, United States | |
| Win | 221–45–10 (1) | Bryan Robinson | TKO (punches) | CVFA: Rumble on the Rock | September 27, 2008 | 2 | 1:00 | Steamboat Rock, Iowa, United States | |
| Win | 220–45–10 (1) | Christopher Clarkson | TKO (punches) | CVFA: Battle For Women's Belts | September 6, 2008 | 1 | 0:46 | Waterloo, Iowa, United States | |
| Win | 219–45–10 (1) | Vic Hall | Submission (rear-naked choke) | CVFA: Independence Day | July 5, 2008 | 2 | 0:27 | Cedar Falls, Iowa, United States | |
| Win | 218–45–10 (1) | Steve Shewry | KO (punch) | CVFA: Battle For the Belts | April 19, 2008 | 2 | 0:07 | Waterloo, Iowa, United States | |
| Win | 217–45–10 (1) | Steve Shewry | KO (punches) | CVFA: Ironman Challenge | March 7, 2008 | 3 | N/A | Pella, Iowa, United States | |
| Win | 216–45–10 (1) | Kris Crabtree | Submission (rear-naked choke) | Extreme Challenge 90 | February 29, 2008 | 1 | N/A | Fort Dodge, Iowa, United States | |
| Win | 215–45–10 (1) | Matt Langbehn | KO (punch) | Cedar Valley Fighting Association | February 16, 2008 | 1 | N/A | Waterloo, Iowa, United States | |
| Loss | 214–45–10 (1) | Chris Tuchscherer | Decision (unanimous) | Max Fights 2 | January 26, 2008 | 3 | 5:00 | Fargo, North Dakota, United States | |
| Win | 214–44–10 (1) | Russ Love | KO (punch) | Iowa Challenge 46 | January 12, 2008 | 1 | 0:20 | Iowa, United States | |
| Loss | 213–44–10 (1) | Travis Wiuff | TKO (punches) | Smash: MMA | November 30, 2007 | 2 | 3:27 | Virginia, United States | |
| Win | 213–43–10 (1) | Bryan Robinson | TKO (punches) | CVFA: Ironman Challenge | November 17, 2007 | 2 | 1:10 | Rudd, Iowa, United States | |
| Win | 212–43–10 (1) | Bryan Ewhers | Submission (rear-naked choke) | CVFA: Fall Brawl | October 13, 2007 | 3 | 1:15 | Waterloo, Iowa, United States | |
| Win | 211–43–10 (1) | Wes Sims | Decision (unanimous) | FF: Capitol Punishment | September 29, 2007 | 3 | 5:00 | Columbus, Ohio, United States | |
| Win | 210–43–10 (1) | Bryan Robinson | TKO (Submission to punches) | CVFA: Brawl at the Falls 2 | September 22, 2007 | 3 | N/A | Iowa Falls, Iowa, United States | |
| Win | 209–43–10 (1) | Paul Bowers | Decision (split) | Max Fights 1 | September 7, 2007 | 3 | 5:00 | Fargo, North Dakota, United States | |
| Win | 208–43–10 (1) | Wayne Porter | Submission (americana) | Iowa Challenge 39 | July 14, 2007 | 1 | 0:53 | Iowa, United States | |
| Win | 207–43–10 (1) | Mark Long | KO (punches) | CVFA: Summer Beatdown | July 13, 2007 | 2 | 1:37 | Waterloo, Iowa, United States | |
| Win | 206–43–10 (1) | Dusty Puckett | TKO (Submission to punches) | Extreme Challenge 79 | June 16, 2007 | 1 | 2:02 | Davenport, Iowa, United States | |
| Loss | 205–43–10 (1) | Ben Rothwell | Submission (kimura) | IFL: Chicago | May 19, 2007 | 2 | 3:11 | Chicago, Illinois, United States | |
| Win | 205–42–10 (1) | Mark Boyer | KO (punch) | Battle of Champions: Round 2 | May 5, 2007 | 1 | 1:31 | Davenport, Iowa, United States | |
| Win | 204–42–10 (1) | Tyson Smith | TKO (punches) | CVFA: Return of the Champions | April 28, 2007 | 1 | 1:24 | Iowa, United States | |
| Win | 203–42–10 (1) | Steve Fiscus | KO (punch) | Revolution Cage Fighting 6 | April 13, 2007 | 1 | 1:03 | Eau Claire, Wisconsin, United States | |
| Win | 202–42–10 (1) | AJ Broer | KO (punch) | Ironman Challenge 27 | March 31, 2007 | 1 | 0:25 | Iowa, United States | |
| Win | 201–42–10 (1) | Jessie Garcia | TKO (punches) | Ironman Challenge 22 | February 23, 2007 | 1 | 2:33 | Iowa, United States | |
| Win | 200–42–10 (1) | Kirk Nielsen | Submission (guillotine choke) | Ironman Challenge 22 | February 23, 2007 | 1 | 1:10 | Iowa, United States | |
| Win | 199–42–10 (1) | Rory Prazak | Submission (americana) | Ironman Challenge 21 | February 9, 2007 | 4 | 0:40 | Iowa, United States | |
| Win | 198–42–10 (1) | Rodney Arp | Submission (rear-naked choke) | Ironman Challenge 21 | February 9, 2007 | 4 | 0:42 | Iowa, United States | |
| Win | 197–42–10 (1) | Jason Roszell | TKO (punches) | Iowa Challenge 34 | February 3, 2007 | 1 | 1:24 | Quincy, Illinois, United States | |
| Win | 196–42–10 (1) | Scott Pulse | KO (punch) | Fury Fights: Temple Fight Night | January 27, 2007 | 1 | 0:12 | Brookings, South Dakota, United States | |
| Win | 195–42–10 (1) | Mike Kofoot | TKO (slam) | Ironman Challenge 17 | December 15, 2006 | 3 | N/A | Iowa, United States | |
| Win | 194–42–10 (1) | Bryan Robinson | Submission (armbar) | Ironman Challenge 14 | November 17, 2006 | 5 | N/A | Iowa, United States | |
| Win | 193–42–10 (1) | Steve Fiscus | KO (punches) | Ironman Challenge 14 | November 17, 2006 | 3 | N/A | Iowa, United States | |
| Win | 192–42–10 (1) | Bryan Robinson | KO (punch) | Ironman Challenge 13 | November 3, 2006 | 2 | 1:44 | Iowa, United States | |
| Win | 191–42–10 (1) | John Medina | TKO (Submission to punches) | Ironman Challenge 12 | October 27, 2006 | 1 | 1:57 | Iowa, United States | |
| Win | 190–42–10 (1) | Manuel Quiroz | Submission (toe hold) | Ironman Challenge 11 | October 20, 2006 | 1 | 3:20 | Manchester, Iowa, United States | |
| Win | 189–42–10 (1) | Belal Alhmaibie | Submission (armbar) | Kickfest 11: Fall Brawl | October 17, 2006 | 2 | 1:34 | Waterloo, Iowa, United States | |
| Win | 188–42–10 (1) | Mike Kofoot | TKO (slam) | NFA: Night of the Beast | September 23, 2006 | 1 | N/A | Fargo, North Dakota, United States | |
| Win | 187–42–10 (1) | Mike Kofoot | TKO (doctor stoppage) | Fight Club Underground | September 14, 2006 | 1 | N/A | Minneapolis, Minnesota, United States | |
| Win | 186–42–10 (1) | Ben Thomas | TKO (Submission to punches) | Iowa Challenge 30 | September 9, 2006 | 1 | 3:55 | Waterloo, Iowa, United States | |
| Win | 185–42–10 (1) | Mike Kofoot | KO (punches) | Royalty Fight Night 1 | September 3, 2006 | 1 | 0:51 | Emmetsburg, Iowa, United States | |
| Win | 184–42–10 (1) | Shawn Nolan | TKO (punches) | Rumble on the River 6 | September 2, 2006 | 1 | 0:45 | Conesville, Iowa, United States | |
| Win | 183–42–10 (1) | Brad Scholten | KO (punches) | Extreme Contact Fighting 2 | July 22, 2006 | 1 | 1:49 | Fort Dodge, Iowa, United States | |
| Win | 182–42–10 (1) | John George | KO (punches) | Kickfest 10: Summer Brawl | June 17, 2006 | 1 | 1:36 | Iowa, United States | |
| Win | 181–42–10 (1) | Ben Byrd | TKO (punches) | Ironman Challenge 8 | June 3, 2006 | 1 | 1:05 | Prairie du Chien, Wisconsin, United States | |
| Win | 180–42–10 (1) | John McElroy | KO (punches) | River City Fight Club | May 20, 2006 | 1 | 3:29 | Conesville, Iowa, United States | |
| Win | 179–42–10 (1) | Rory Prazak | KO (punches) | Ironman Challenge 7 | May 19, 2006 | 1 | N/A | Iowa, United States | |
| Win | 178–42–10 (1) | Dan Wheatley | KO (punches) | Ironman Challenge 6 | May 12, 2006 | 2 | N/A | Iowa, United States | |
| Win | 177–42–10 (1) | Mark Long | KO (punches) | CVFA: Caged Combat | May 6, 2006 | 1 | 1:59 | Iowa, United States | |
| Win | 176–42–10 (1) | Mike Caswell | KO (punch) | CVFA: Friday Night Throwdown 2 | March 24, 2006 | 1 | 0:10 | Waterloo, Iowa, United States | |
| Win | 175–42–10 (1) | Chris Clark | Submission (front choke) | Ironman Challenge 2 | March 17, 2006 | 2 | N/A | Iowa, United States | |
| Win | 174–42–10 (1) | Nowanda Bell | KO (punch) | Ironman Challenge 1 | March 10, 2006 | 2 | 0:20 | Charles City, Iowa, United States | |
| Win | 173–42–10 (1) | Shawn Nolan | TKO (punches) | CVFA: Friday Night Throwdown | January 6, 2006 | 1 | 1:17 | Cedar Rapids, Iowa, United States | |
| Win | 172–42–10 (1) | Manuel Quiroz | KO (punches) | Coliseum 2 | December 28, 2005 | 1 | N/A | Rochester, Minnesota, United States | |
| Win | 171–42–10 (1) | Brandon Quigley | Submission (rear-naked choke) | Kickfest: November Kickfest | November 26, 2005 | 1 | N/A | Moline, Illinois, United States | |
| Win | 170–42–10 (1) | Chris Clark | TKO (Submission to punches) | Rumble on the River 5 | August 27, 2005 | 1 | 0:50 | Conesville, Iowa, United States | |
| Win | 169–42–10 (1) | Steve Pilkington | Submission (rear-naked choke) | AFA: The Octagon 2 | June 10, 2005 | 1 | 2:20 | Waterloo, Iowa, United States | |
| Win | 168–42–10 (1) | Dan Wheatley | KO (punch) | Spring Brawl | April 30, 2005 | 1 | N/A | Minot, North Dakota, United States | |
| Win | 167–42–10 (1) | Rory Prazak | KO (punch) | Spring Brawl | April 30, 2005 | 1 | N/A | Minot, North Dakota, United States | |
| Win | 166–42–10 (1) | Session Harper | Submission (rear-naked choke) | XKK: St. Paul | April 23, 2005 | 1 | 0:35 | St. Paul, Minnesota, United States | |
| Loss | 165–42–10 (1) | Mike Whitehead | Submission (scarfhold headlock choke) | Extreme Challenge 61 | April 22, 2005 | 1 | 1:48 | Osceola, Iowa, United States | |
| Win | 165–41–10 (1) | Dan Wheatley | TKO (Submission to punches) | AFC 1: Takedown | April 9, 2005 | 1 | N/A | Omaha, Nebraska, United States | |
| Win | 164–41–10 (1) | Greg Larson | Submission (armbar) | Downtown Destruction 3 | March 2, 2005 | 1 | N/A | Des Moines, Iowa, United States | |
| Win | 163–41–10 (1) | Kaelan Gruchow | Submission (rear-naked choke) | Kickfest 8 | February 12, 2005 | 1 | 1:18 | Clive, Iowa, United States | |
| Win | 162–41–10 (1) | Rory Prazak | TKO (punches) | NFA: Super Brawl | January 29, 2005 | 1 | 2:13 | North Dakota, United States | |
| Win | 161–41–10 (1) | Kyle Olsen | TKO (Submission to punches) | AFA: Friday Night Fights | January 14, 2005 | 1 | 1:00 | Waterloo, Iowa, United States | |
| Win | 160–41–10 (1) | Manuel Quiroz | Submission (rear-naked choke) | Downtown Destruction 1 | January 12, 2005 | 1 | 0:49 | Des Moines, Iowa, United States | |
| Win | 159–41–10 (1) | Don Richards | TKO (corner stoppage) | KOTC 45: King of the Cage 45 | November 20, 2004 | 1 | 5:00 | Belterra, Indiana, United States | |
| Win | 158–41–10 (1) | Kaelan Gruchow | KO (punches) | Iowa Challenge 17 | November 6, 2004 | 1 | N/A | Marshalltown, Iowa, United States | |
| Win | 157–41–10 (1) | Mark Long | TKO (Submission to punches) | XKK: Fridley | November 5, 2004 | 2 | 0:16 | Fridley, Minnesota, United States | |
| Win | 156–41–10 (1) | Dan Wheatley | TKO (Submission to punches) | Judgment Night 2 | November 3, 2004 | 1 | 1:48 | Des Moines, Iowa, United States | |
| Win | 155–41–10 (1) | Matt Albright | TKO (punches) | XKK: Des Moines | October 30, 2004 | 1 | 0:22 | Des Moines, Iowa, United States | |
| Win | 154–41–10 (1) | Dan Wheatley | KO (head kick) | Iowa Challenge 16 | October 23, 2004 | 1 | N/A | Oskaloosa, Iowa, United States | |
| Win | 153–41–10 (1) | Dan Wheatley | KO (head kick) | Judgment Night 1 | October 6, 2004 | 1 | N/A | Des Moines, Iowa, United States | |
| Win | 152–41–10 (1) | Brandon Quigley | Submission (rear-naked choke) | NFA: Battle For the Belts | September 25, 2004 | 1 | N/A | East Grand Forks, Minnesota, United States | |
| Win | 151–41–10 (1) | Jeremy Shuey | TKO (Submission to punches) | River City Fight Club | September 4, 2004 | 1 | N/A | Iowa, United States | |
| Win | 150–41–10 (1) | Albert Newberry | Submission (guillotine choke) | Xtreme Kage Kombat | August 7, 2004 | 1 | N/A | Des Moines, Iowa, United States | |
| Win | 149–41–10 (1) | Tom McCloud | Submission (guillotine choke) | Ultimate Throwdown | July 16, 2004 | 1 | 2:13 | Des Moines, Iowa, United States | |
| Win | 148–41–10 (1) | Rory Prazak | Submission (arm-triangle choke) | Iowa Extreme Fighting | April 13, 2004 | 2 | 2:23 | Fort Dodge, Iowa, United States | |
| Win | 147–41–10 (1) | Ivan Carabello | TKO (Submission to punches) | Dangerzone 26: Professional Level Cage Fighting | April 10, 2004 | 1 | 0:32 | Osceola, Iowa, United States | |
| Win | 146–41–10 (1) | Joe Ripple | Submission (front choke) | Bar Room Brawl 25 | March 31, 2004 | 1 | 1:19 | Owatonna, Minnesota, United States | |
| Win | 145–41–10 (1) | Rory Prazak | Submission (armbar) | Bar Room Brawl 25 | March 31, 2004 | 1 | 2:50 | Owatonna, Minnesota, United States | |
| Win | 144–41–10 (1) | Albert Newberry | Submission (guillotine choke) | AFA: Return of the Champions | March 27, 2004 | 1 | N/A | Waterloo, Iowa, United States | |
| Win | 143–41–10 (1) | Adam Norciaj | KO (punch) | NFA: Best Damn Fights | March 20, 2004 | 1 | 0:05 | Fargo, North Dakota, United States | |
| Win | 142–41–10 (1) | Mike Preece | TKO (Submission to punches) | VFC 7: Showdown | March 6, 2004 | 1 | 0:20 | Council Bluffs, Iowa, United States | |
| Loss | 141–41–10 (1) | Eric Pele | Submission (verbal) | KOTC 32: Bringing Heat | January 24, 2004 | 1 | 1:35 | Miami, Florida, United States | |
| Win | 141–40–10 (1) | Manuel Quiroz | TKO (Submission to punches) | AFA: Battle For the Belts 2 | January 23, 2004 | 1 | 1:03 | Iowa, United States | |
| Win | 140–40–10 (1) | Rory Prazak | Submission (guillotine choke) | Bar Room Brawl 21 | January 3, 2004 | 1 | 0:45 | Owatonna, Minnesota, United States | |
| Win | 139–40–10 (1) | Doug Sauer | Submission (rear-naked choke) | RSF: Shooto Challenge 2 | January 2, 2004 | 1 | 2:05 | Belleville, Illinois, United States | |
| Win | 138–40–10 (1) | Jason Purcell | Submission (armbar) | AFA: Second Coming | December 6, 2003 | 1 | 2:40 | Mason City, Iowa, United States | |
| Win | 137–40–10 (1) | Travis Utley | Submission (rear-naked choke) | Bar Room Brawl 18 | November 19, 2003 | 1 | 0:46 | Owatonna, Minnesota, United States | |
| Loss | 136–40–10 (1) | Travis Wiuff | Decision (split) | Iowa Challenge 11 | October 18, 2003 | 3 | 3:00 | Iowa, United States | |
| Win | 136–39–10 (1) | Joe Alvarez | KO (punches) | Iowa Extreme Fighting 11 | October 4, 2003 | 1 | 2:45 | Iowa, United States | |
| Win | 135–39–10 (1) | Brian Dunn | Submission (rear-naked choke) | RSF: Shooto Challenge | October 3, 2003 | 1 | 1:35 | Belleville, Illinois, United States | |
| Win | 134–39–10 (1) | Joe Nameth | Submission (kimura) | CFM: Octogono Extremo | September 27, 2003 | 1 | N/A | Monterrey, Mexico | |
| Loss | 133–39–10 (1) | Ray Seraile | Decision (unanimous) | SuperBrawl 31 | September 20, 2003 | 3 | 3:00 | Honolulu, Hawaii, United States | |
| Win | 133–38–10 (1) | Rory Prazak | TKO (punches) | Bar Room Brawl 14 | September 17, 2003 | 2 | 2:37 | United States | |
| Win | 132–38–10 (1) | Vince Lucero | Submission (guillotine choke) | XCF 2: Havoc in Havasu 1 | September 6, 2003 | 1 | 2:30 | Lake Havasu City, Arizona, United States | |
| Win | 131–38–10 (1) | Bryan Robinson | KO (spinning back kick) | Kickfest 6 | August 23, 2003 | 1 | 0:30 | Waterloo, Iowa, United States | |
| Win | 130–38–10 (1) | Michael Miller | Submission (rear-naked choke) | Extreme Challenge 52 | August 15, 2003 | 1 | 0:45 | Rock Island, Illinois, United States | |
| Loss | 129–38–10 (1) | Miodrag Petkovic | Decision (unanimous) | DF: Durata World Grand Prix 2 | August 10, 2003 | 1 | 5:00 | Opatija, Croatia | |
| Win | 129–37–10 (1) | Brian Dunn | KO (punch) | AFA: Battle For the Belts | July 12, 2003 | 2 | 0:10 | Iowa, United States | |
| Win | 128–37–10 (1) | Lewis Burns | Submission (guillotine choke) | AFA: Battle For the Belts | July 12, 2003 | 1 | 0:25 | Iowa, United States | |
| Win | 127–37–10 (1) | Victor Rohrer | Submission (front choke) | Independence Day Showdown | July 4, 2003 | 1 | N/A | | |
| Win | 126–37–10 (1) | Mike Delaney | Decision (unanimous) | Freestyle Combat Challenge 11 | June 28, 2003 | 3 | 5:00 | Racine, Wisconsin, United States | |
| Win | 125–37–10 (1) | Demian Decorah | Decision (unanimous) | IFA: The Return | May 3, 2003 | 1 | 9:00 | Iowa, United States | |
| Win | 124–37–10 (1) | Jeremy Armstrong | KO (punch) | IFA: The Return | May 3, 2003 | 1 | 1:01 | Iowa, United States | |
| Draw | 123–37–10 (1) | Bruce Nelson | Draw | Sabin Showdown | April 26, 2003 | 3 | 3:00 | Moorhead, Minnesota, United States | |
| Loss | 123–37–9 (1) | Greg Wikan | Submission (verbal) | ICC 2: Rebellion | April 18, 2003 | 1 | 4:43 | Minneapolis, Minnesota, United States | |
| Win | 123–36–9 (1) | Royce Louck | TKO (Submission to punches) | Minnesota Extreme Fight 2 | April 12, 2003 | 1 | N/A | Duluth, Minnesota, United States | |
| Win | 122–36–9 (1) | Joe Riggs | Submission (choke) | RITC 45: Finally | March 1, 2003 | 1 | 0:48 | Phoenix, Arizona, United States | |
| Win | 121–36–9 (1) | Dan Croonquist | Submission (guillotine choke) | CAGE | February 1, 2003 | 1 | 4:28 | Fort Dodge, Iowa, United States | |
| Win | 120–36–9 (1) | Jeremy Armstrong | TKO (Submission to punches) | CAGE | February 1, 2003 | 1 | 0:57 | Fort Dodge, Iowa, United States | |
| Win | 119–36–9 (1) | Mitch Walters | KO (punch) | CAGE | February 1, 2003 | 1 | 0:12 | Fort Dodge, Iowa, United States | |
| Win | 118–36–9 (1) | Jeremy Armstrong | Submission (rear-naked choke) | Sokol Hall Brawl 3 | January 15, 2003 | 1 | 0:47 | Omaha, Nebraska, United States | |
| Loss | 117–36–9 (1) | Jeremy Horn | TKO (corner stoppage) | ICC 1: Retribution | January 12, 2003 | 2 | 0:50 | Minneapolis, Minnesota, United States | |
| Win | 117–35–9 (1) | Mike Toyne | TKO (Submission to punches) | Blairstown Brawl 7 | December 21, 2002 | 1 | 1:40 | Blairstown, Iowa, United States | |
| Win | 116–35–9 (1) | Josh Stamp | TKO (Submission to punches) | Extreme Combat 1 | December 6, 2002 | 1 | 1:45 | Minneapolis, Minnesota, United States | |
| Win | 115–35–9 (1) | Raymond Luna | Submission (guillotine choke) | Thursday Night Fights | November 14, 2002 | 1 | 1:17 | Mason City, Iowa, United States | |
| Loss | 114–35–9 (1) | Forrest Griffin | TKO (doctor stoppage) | CC 1: Halloween Heat | October 26, 2002 | 1 | 5:00 | Atlanta, Georgia, United States | |
| Win | 114–34–9 (1) | Adam Harris | KO (punch) | Blairstown Brawl 6 | October 5, 2002 | 1 | 0:06 | Blairstown, Iowa, United States | |
| Loss | 113–34–9 (1) | Ben Rothwell | TKO (Submission to injury) | Freestyle Combat Challenge 8 | October 4, 2002 | 1 | 5:00 | Racine, Wisconsin, United States | |
| Win | 113–33–9 (1) | Riley McIlhon | Submission (rear-naked choke) | Iowa Challenge 6 | September 13, 2002 | 1 | 4:13 | Iowa, United States | |
| Loss | 112–33–9 (1) | Travis Wiuff | Decision (unanimous) | Iowa Challenge 5 | July 13, 2002 | 3 | 5:00 | Iowa, United States | |
| Win | 112–32–9 (1) | Johnathan Ivey | Submission (kimura) | XCF: California Pancration Championships | June 11, 2002 | 1 | 3:39 | Los Angeles, California, United States | |
| Win | 111–32–9 (1) | Darren Peyton | TKO (Submission to punches) | Iowa Extreme Fighting 7 | April 19, 2002 | 1 | 3:30 | Iowa, United States | |
| Win | 110–32–9 (1) | Kevin Oliver | TKO (Submission to punches) | American Reality Combat 3 | April 18, 2002 | 1 | 0:28 | Evansdale, Iowa, United States | |
| Win | 109–32–9 (1) | Carle Garner | Submission (rear-naked choke) | Tuesday Night Fights | March 26, 2002 | 1 | 0:49 | | |
| Win | 108–32–9 (1) | Don Lawrence | TKO (Submission to punches) | Sunday Night Fights | March 11, 2002 | 1 | 0:13 | | |
| Win | 107–32–9 (1) | Jason Bentley | TKO (Submission to punches) | Iowa Challenge 4 | March 2, 2002 | 1 | 0:40 | Iowa, United States | |
| Win | 106–32–9 (1) | Robbie Beltz | TKO (Submission to punches) | Tuesday Night Fights | January 24, 2002 | 1 | 0:14 | Cedar Rapids, Iowa, United States | |
| Win | 105–32–9 (1) | Bruce Nelson | TKO (Submission to punches) | Friday Night Fights | January 18, 2002 | 1 | 2:38 | | |
| Win | 104–32–9 (1) | Tony Day | KO (punch) | Tuesday Night Fights | January 15, 2002 | 1 | 0:34 | Cedar Rapids, Iowa, United States | |
| Win | 103–32–9 (1) | Tony Day | KO (punches) | Freestyle Combat Challenge 6 | January 5, 2002 | 1 | 1:24 | Racine, Wisconsin, United States | |
| Loss | 102–32–9 (1) | Mike Radnov | Decision (unanimous) | Rock 'N' Rumble 1 | December 29, 2001 | 3 | 5:00 | | |
| Win | 102–31–9 (1) | Don Hildebrandt | TKO (punches) | CFC: Winter War | December 8, 2001 | 1 | 1:03 | Iowa, United States | |
| Win | 101–31–9 (1) | Brad Russell | KO (punch) | Iowa Fight Night 3 | November 10, 2001 | 1 | 0:19 | Iowa, United States | |
| Win | 100–31–9 (1) | Anthony Seu | Submission (rear-naked choke) | Iowa Fight Night 2 | October 27, 2001 | 1 | 1:11 | Iowa, United States | |
| Win | 99–31–9 (1) | Scott Walker | KO (punch) | Iowa Fight Night 1 | October 13, 2001 | 2 | 1:09 | Iowa, United States | |
| NC | 98–31–9 (1) | Greg Wikan | NC (premature stoppage) | UW: Street Fight Minnesota | September 30, 2001 | 1 | N/A | St. Paul, Minnesota, United States | |
| Draw | 98–31–9 | Dan Severn | Draw | Iowa Challenge 3 | September 22, 2001 | 3 | 5:00 | Waterloo, Iowa, United States | |
| Win | 98–31–8 | Jamie Webb | TKO (punches) | Gladiators 18 | September 8, 2001 | 1 | 0:28 | | |
| Win | 97–31–8 | Tony Day | TKO (punches) | Iowa Challenge 2 | August 11, 2001 | 1 | 0:38 | Cedar Rapids, Iowa, United States | |
| Win | 96–31–8 | Matt Clemens | TKO (punches) | Ultimate Submission Challenge | July 7, 2001 | 1 | 0:45 | Bethalto, Illinois, United States | |
| Loss | 95–31–8 | Dan Severn | Decision (unanimous) | WEC 1: Princes of Pain | June 30, 2001 | 3 | 5:00 | Lemoore, California, United States | |
| Win | 95–30–8 | Andy Burwell | TKO (Submission to punches) | Rumble on the River 2 | June 25, 2001 | 1 | 0:38 | West Terre Haute, Indiana, United States | |
| Win | 94–30–8 | Robert Bryant | TKO (Submission to punches) | Lincoln Fights 2 | June 17, 2001 | 1 | 0:45 | | |
| Win | 93–30–8 | Cal Worsham | TKO (corner stoppage) | IFC Warriors Challenge 13 | June 15, 2001 | 2 | 5:00 | California, United States | |
| Win | 92–30–8 | Demetrius Worlds | Submission (rear-naked choke) | Lincoln Fights 1 | June 10, 2001 | 1 | 2:10 | | |
| Win | 91–30–8 | Ben Boyer | TKO (Submission to punches) | Thursday Night Fights | May 30, 2001 | 1 | 0:25 | Omaha, Nebraska, United States | |
| Win | 90–30–8 | Lionel Saunders | Submission (armbar) | Thursday Night Fights | May 30, 2001 | 1 | 1:30 | Omaha, Nebraska, United States | |
| Win | 89–30–8 | John Medina | Submission (armbar) | IFF 8: End Game | May 18, 2001 | 1 | 0:39 | Iowa, United States | |
| Draw | 88–30–8 | Clayton Miller | Draw | Iowa Challenge Eliminations 1 | April 28, 2001 | 1 | 10:00 | | |
| Draw | 88–30–7 | Mark Jaquith | Draw | Kickfest 3 | April 13, 2001 | 1 | 12:00 | Iowa, United States | |
| Win | 88–30–6 | Ben Boyer | Submission (rear-naked choke) | Freestyle Combat Challenge 4 | March 31, 2001 | 1 | 0:48 | Racine, Wisconsin, United States | |
| Win | 87–30–6 | Allan Sullivan | Submission (armbar) | Reality Submission Fighting 3 | March 30, 2001 | 1 | 7:35 | Belleville, Illinois, United States | |
| Loss | 86–30–6 | Rich Franklin | TKO (broken hand) | Rings USA: Battle of Champions | March 17, 2001 | 1 | 5:00 | Council Bluffs, Iowa, United States | |
| Win | 86–29–6 | Ron Faircloth | Submission (armbar) | Iowa Challenge 1 | February 10, 2001 | 1 | 2:55 | Waterloo, Iowa, United States | |
| Win | 85–29–6 | Kerry Schall | TKO (punches) | Extreme Tuesday Night Fights | January 18, 2001 | 1 | 6:56 | Davenport, Iowa, United States | |
| Win | 84–29–6 | Troy Rugger | Submission (armbar) | Freestyle Combat Challenge 3 | January 6, 2001 | 1 | 0:45 | | |
| Loss | 83–29–6 | Harout Terzyan | Submission (toe hold) | Reality Submission Fighting 2 | January 5, 2001 | 1 | 3:26 | | |
| Win | 83–28–6 | Troy Rugger | TKO (Submission to punches) | Iowa Free Fight 7 | December 15, 2000 | 1 | 1:20 | Iowa, United States | |
| Loss | 82–28–6 | Evan Tanner | Submission (triangle choke) | Unified Shoot Wrestling Federation 18 | November 25, 2000 | 1 | 4:31 | Amarillo, Texas, United States | |
| Win | 82–27–6 | Steve Miller | TKO (Submission to punches) | Iowa Free Fight 6 | November 19, 2000 | 1 | 1:47 | Iowa, United States | |
| Loss | 81–27–6 | Mike Rogers | Submission (neck crank) | Submission Fighting Championships 12 | November 3, 2000 | 1 | N/A | Collinsville, Illinois, United States | |
| Loss | 81–26–6 | Dan Severn | Submission (rear-naked choke) | Dangerzone: Night of the Beast | October 28, 2000 | 1 | 2:01 | Lynchburg, Virginia, United States | |
| Win | 81–25–6 | Wesley Correira | Submission (armbar) | SuperBrawl 18 | October 26, 2000 | 1 | 4:49 | Agana, Guam | |
| Win | 80–25–6 | Greg Wikan | Submission (armbar) | Rings USA: Rising Stars Final | September 30, 2000 | 1 | 3:48 | Moline, Illinois, United States | |
| Win | 79–25–6 | Bruce Nelson | Submission (guillotine choke) | IFF 5: Battle for the Belts | September 23, 2000 | 1 | 1:19 | Iowa, United States | |
| Win | 78–25–6 | Ron Rumpf | KO (punch) | IFF 5: Battle for the Belts | September 23, 2000 | 1 | 0:08 | Iowa, United States | |
| Win | 77–25–6 | Bruce Nelson | KO (punches) | IFF 5: Battle for the Belts | September 23, 2000 | 1 | 2:54 | Iowa, United States | |
| Win | 76–25–6 | Harry Moskowitz | Submission (armbar) | Submission Fighting Championships 11 | August 23, 2000 | 1 | 6:28 | Collinsville, Illinois, United States | |
| Win | 75–25–6 | Quinton Lemke | TKO (Submission to punches) | Iowa Free Fight 4 | July 28, 2000 | 1 | 1:36 | Iowa, United States | |
| Loss | 74–25–6 | Tsuyoshi Kosaka | Decision (unanimous) | Rings USA: Rising Stars Block A | July 15, 2000 | 3 | 5:00 | Orem, Utah, United States | |
| Win | 74–24–6 | Matt Frost | Submission (rear-naked choke) | Gladiators 7 | July 14, 2000 | 1 | 2:17 | | |
| Loss | 73–24–6 | Zaza Tkeshelashvili | Submission (achilles lock) | Rings Russia: Russia vs. The World | May 20, 2000 | 1 | 1:20 | Yekaterinburg, Sverdlovsk, Russia | |
| Win | 73–23–6 | Chad Gilson | KO (punch) | Submission Fighting Championships 10 | April 28, 2000 | 1 | 0:51 | Collinsville, Illinois, United States | |
| Loss | 72–23–6 | Renato Sobral | Submission (armbar) | Rings: Millennium Combine 1 | April 20, 2000 | 1 | 4:49 | Tokyo, Japan | |
| Win | 72–22–6 | Mitch Rosland | TKO (Submission to punches) | Iowa Free Fight 2 | March 3, 2000 | 1 | 1:11 | Iowa, United States | |
| Loss | 71–22–6 | Ricco Rodriguez | Submission (armbar) | KOTC 2 - Desert Storm | February 5, 2000 | 1 | 4:49 | San Jacinto, California, United States | |
| Win | 71–21–6 | Jay Carmack | Submission (guillotine choke) | Submission Fighting Championships 9 | January 28, 2000 | 1 | 3:28 | Belleville, Illinois, United States | |
| Win | 70–21–6 | Kristof Midoux | KO (punches) | IFC: Battleground 2000 | January 22, 2000 | 1 | 8:51 | Kahnawake, Quebec, Canada | |
| Win | 69–21–6 | Shane Bailey | TKO (punches) | Iowa Free Fight 1 | January 18, 2000 | 1 | 0:24 | Iowa, United States | |
| Win | 68–21–6 | Brad Schafer | Submission (armbar) | Iowa Free Fight 1 | January 18, 2000 | 1 | 7:38 | Iowa, United States | |
| Win | 67–21–6 | Jason Fulcher | TKO (punches) | Iowa Free Fight 1 | January 18, 2000 | 1 | 1:03 | Iowa, United States | |
| Loss | 66–21–6 | Branden Lee Hinkle | TKO (injury) | Holiday Fight Party | December 11, 1999 | 1 | 12:38 | Georgia, United States | |
| Loss | 66–20–6 | Ian Freeman | TKO (retirement) | MB 1: The Beginning | December 5, 1999 | 2 | 5:00 | London, England | |
| Win | 66–19–6 | Jason Allar | TKO (Submission to elbows) | Extreme Challenge 30 | December 1, 1999 | 1 | 2:53 | Council Bluffs, Iowa, United States | |
| Win | 65–19–6 | Kevin Leemon | TKO (Submission to punches) | Iowa Extreme Fighting 5 | November 28, 1999 | 1 | 1:33 | Iowa, United States | |
| Win | 64–19–6 | Mike Bruce | TKO (Submission to punches) | Dangerzone: Ft. Wayne | November 22, 1999 | 1 | 0:55 | Fort Wayne, Indiana, United States | |
| Draw | 63–19–6 | Sanae Kikuta | Draw | Pancrase - Breakthrough 9 | October 25, 1999 | 1 | 15:00 | Tokyo, Japan | |
| Win | 63–19–5 | Brad Schafer | Submission (armbar) | Kickfest 2 | October 9, 1999 | 1 | 1:03 | Waterloo, Iowa, United States | |
| Win | 62–19–5 | Aaron Keeney | TKO (punches) | Extreme Challenge: Trials | October 4, 1999 | 1 | 1:54 | Mason City, Iowa, United States | |
| Loss | 61–19–5 | John Marsh | Submission (heel hook) | SuperBrawl 13 | September 7, 1999 | 2 | 2:48 | Honolulu, Hawaii, United States | |
| Loss | 61–18–5 | Tedd Williams | Decision (unanimous) | Lionheart Invitational | September 1, 1999 | 1 | 20:00 | Atlanta, Georgia, United States | |
| Win | 61–17–5 | Wade Rome | TKO (punches) | Extreme Challenge 27 | August 21, 1999 | 1 | 0:59 | Davenport, Iowa, United States | |
| Win | 60–17–5 | Dan Chase | KO (punch) | Absolute Face Off | August 8, 1999 | 1 | 0:40 | Phoenix, Arizona, United States | Won ISCF Pro Super Heavyweight US Title |
| Win | 59–17–5 | David Dodd | Decision (unanimous) | UFC 21: Return of the Champions | July 16, 1999 | 2 | 5:00 | Cedar Rapids, Iowa, United States | |
| Loss | 58–17–5 | Ahmad Ahmad | Submission (heel hook) | Neutral Grounds 12 | May 28, 1999 | 1 | N/A | | |
| Loss | 58–16–5 | Jeremiah Miller | Decision (unanimous) | Neutral Grounds 12 | May 28, 1999 | 1 | 10:00 | | |
| Win | 58–15–5 | Heath Herring | Decision (unanimous) | Extreme Challenge 24 | May 15, 1999 | 1 | 12:00 | Salt Lake City, Utah, United States | |
| Loss | 57–15–5 | Pete Williams | Submission (armbar) | UFC 20: Battle for the Gold | May 7, 1999 | 1 | 6:28 | Birmingham, Alabama, United States | |
| Win | 57–14–5 | Albert Newberry | TKO (Submission to punches) | Kickfest 1 | April 3, 1999 | 1 | 1:21 | Cedar Falls, Iowa, United States | |
| Loss | 56–14–5 | Vladimir Matyushenko | Submission (neck crank) | IFC: Fighters Revenge | April 2, 1999 | 1 | 15:33 | Quebec, Canada | |
| Win | 56–13–5 | Harry Moskowitz | KO (punches) | HOOKnSHOOT: Horizon | March 20, 1999 | 1 | 2:00 | Evansville, Indiana, United States | |
| Win | 55–13–5 | Kevin Burrell | KO (punch) | Submission Fighting Championships 5 | January 31, 1999 | 1 | 0:06 | Belleville, Illinois, United States | |
| Win | 54–13–5 | Tommy Graham | Submission (armbar) | HOOKnSHOOT: Trial | January 30, 1999 | 1 | 2:45 | Evansville, Indiana, United States | |
| Win | 53–13–5 | Barrett Banks | KO (punch) | Extreme Boxing 1 | January 20, 1999 | 1 | 0:38 | Davenport, Iowa, United States | |
| Win | 52–13–5 | John Dixson | Submission (armbar) | IFC: Extreme Combat | January 9, 1999 | 1 | 0:39 | Montreal, Quebec, Canada | IFC: Extreme Combat Tournament Final. |
| Win | 51–13–5 | Peter McLeod | Submission (armbar) | IFC: Extreme Combat | January 9, 1999 | 1 | 5:00 | Montreal, Quebec, Canada | IFC: Extreme Combat Tournament Semi Final. |
| Win | 50–13–5 | Wade Hamilton | Submission (rear-naked choke) | IFC: Extreme Combat | January 9, 1999 | 1 | 1:22 | Montreal, Quebec, Canada | IFC: Extreme Combat Tournament Quarterfinal. |
| Loss | 49–13–5 | George Allen | DQ | New Year's Eve Knockout 1 | December 31, 1998 | 1 | N/A | Atlanta, Georgia, United States | |
| Win | 49–12–5 | Jeremy Bullock | KO (slam) | Extreme Challenge 22 | November 21, 1998 | 1 | 0:44 | West Valley City, Utah, United States | |
| Loss | 48–12–5 | Neddie Noah | Submission (rear-naked choke) | Circuito Brasileiro de Vale Tudo 4 | November 18, 1998 | 1 | 10:36 | Brazil | |
| Win | 48–11–5 | David Giannotti | TKO (Submission to punches) | HOOKnSHOOT: Eruption | November 7, 1998 | 1 | 2:20 | Evansville, Indiana, United States | |
| Draw | 47–11–5 | Joe Geromiller | Draw | Submission Fighting Championships 4 | November 6, 1998 | 1 | 14:00 | Carbondale, Illinois, United States | |
| Win | 47–11–4 | Luiz Claudio Nunes | TKO (punches) | World Vale Tudo Championship 6 | November 1, 1998 | 1 | 1:53 | Brazil | WVC 6 Tournament Final. |
| Win | 46–11–4 | Augusto Ferreira | TKO (Submission to punches) | World Vale Tudo Championship 6 | November 1, 1998 | 1 | 7:06 | Brazil | WVC 6 Tournament Semifinal. |
| Win | 45–11–4 | Alex Cerqueira | TKO (Submission to punches) | World Vale Tudo Championship 6 | November 1, 1998 | 1 | 2:18 | Brazil | WVC 6 Tournament Quarterfinal. |
| Win | 44–11–4 | Tommy Sauer | TKO (Submission to punches) | Extreme Challenge 21 | October 17, 1998 | 1 | 1:57 | Hayward, Wisconsin, United States | |
| Draw | 43–11–4 | Ikuhisa Minowa | Draw | Pancrase - Advance 9 | October 4, 1998 | 2 | 3:00 | Tokyo, Japan | |
| Win | 43–11–3 | Albert Newberry | Submission (armbar) | Southern Iowa Ultimate Fighting 2 | September 10, 1998 | 1 | 2:48 | Iowa, United States | |
| Win | 42–11–3 | Robby Ruby | Submission (armbar) | Southern Iowa Ultimate Fighting 2 | September 10, 1998 | 1 | 1:38 | Iowa, United States | |
| Draw | 41–11–3 | Larry Parker | Draw | Extreme Challenge 20 | August 22, 1998 | 1 | 15:00 | Davenport, Iowa, United States | |
| Loss | 41–11–2 | Gabriel Ulbegi | Decision (unanimous) | HOOKnSHOOT: Quest | August 14, 1998 | 1 | 30:00 | | |
| Win | 41–10–2 | David Pa'aluhi | Technical Submission (triangle armbar) | SuperBrawl 8 | August 4, 1998 | 1 | 1:47 | Honolulu, Hawaii, United States | |
| Win | 40–10–2 | Felix Mitchell | KO (punches) | Midwest Fighting 1 | July 28, 1998 | 1 | 4:25 | | |
| Win | 39–10–2 | Davey Conger | Submission (rear-naked choke) | Midwest Fighting 1 | July 28, 1998 | 1 | 1:00 | | |
| Loss | 38–10–2 | Faith Ulbegi | Decision (unanimous) | Cage Combat 3 | July 15, 1998 | 1 | 15:00 | Ontario, California, United States | |
| Win | 38–9–2 | Dave DeRosa | Submission (triangle choke) | Cage Combat 3 | July 15, 1998 | 1 | 9:08 | Cleveland, Ohio, United States | |
| Win | 37–9–2 | Devin Love | Submission (rear-naked choke) | Cage Combat 3 | July 15, 1998 | 1 | 0:26 | Cleveland, Ohio, United States | |
| Loss | 37–9–2 | Brian Gassaway | Decision | Cage Combat 3 | July 15, 1998 | 1 | 15:00 | Cleveland, Ohio, United States | |
| Win | 36–9–2 | Mike Johnson | Submission (armbar) | Southern Iowa Ultimate Fighting 1 | June 25, 1998 | 1 | 0:10 | Iowa, United States | |
| Win | 35–9–2 | Marvin Jones | TKO (Submission to punches) | Southern Iowa Ultimate Fighting 1 | June 25, 1998 | 1 | 2:11 | Iowa, United States | |
| Win | 34–9–2 | Brad Anderson | Submission (triangle armbar) | IFC 8: Showdown at Shooting Star | June 20, 1998 | 1 | 2:56 | Mahnomen, Minnesota, United States | IFC 8 Tournament Final. |
| Win | 33–9–2 | George Allen | KO (elbows) | IFC 8: Showdown at Shooting Star | June 20, 1998 | 1 | 3:17 | Mahnomen, Minnesota, United States | IFC 8 Tournament Semi Final. |
| Win | 32–9–2 | Guy Hinton | Submission (armbar) | Kombat Zone 1 | June 13, 1998 | 1 | 1:36 | Indiana, United States | |
| Win | 31–9–2 | Eric Hill | Submission (triangle choke) | IFC 7: Cage Combat | May 30, 1998 | 1 | 6:49 | Quebec, Canada | |
| Win | 30–9–2 | Jaymon Hotz | Submission (triangle armbar) | Extreme Challenge 18 | May 15, 1998 | 1 | 1:57 | Davenport, Iowa, United States | |
| Win | 29–9–2 | Jeremy Morrison | TKO (Submission to punches) | Fearless Freestyle Fighting 2 | May 9, 1998 | 1 | 1:19 | | |
| Win | 28–9–2 | Jason Lautzenheiser | Submission (rear-naked choke) | Fearless Freestyle Fighting 2 | May 9, 1998 | 1 | 0:44 | | |
| Loss | 27–9–2 | Dan Severn | Submission (americana) | Gladiators 2 | April 18, 1998 | 1 | 10:39 | | |
| Win | 27–8–2 | Clayton Miller | Submission (armbar) | Iowa Vale Tudo Championships 3 | April 10, 1998 | 1 | 2:20 | Iowa, United States | |
| Win | 26–8–2 | Jason Powers | Submission (triangle choke) | Iowa Vale Tudo Championships 3 | April 10, 1998 | 1 | 0:51 | Iowa, United States | |
| Draw | 25–8–2 | Jeremy Horn | Draw | Extreme Challenge 16 | March 26, 1998 | 1 | 20:00 | Iowa, United States | |
| Win | 25–8–1 | Jason Powers | TKO (Submission to punches) | Iowa Vale Tudo Championships 2 | March 9, 1998 | 1 | 0:22 | Iowa, United States | |
| Win | 24–8–1 | Bob Waters | Submission (armbar) | Iowa Vale Tudo Championships 2 | March 9, 1998 | 1 | 2:00 | Iowa, United States | |
| Win | 23–8–1 | Courtney Turner | TKO (Submission to punches) | RnB 2: Bare Knuckle Brawl | February 20, 1998 | 1 | 1:16 | Atlanta, Georgia, United States | |
| Win | 22–8–1 | Sam Adkins | Submission (armbar) | RnB 2: Bare Knuckle Brawl | February 20, 1998 | 1 | 0:45 | Atlanta, Georgia, United States | |
| Win | 21–8–1 | Jamie Schell | Submission (armbar) | RnB 2: Bare Knuckle Brawl | February 20, 1998 | 1 | 0:36 | Atlanta, Georgia, United States | |
| Win | 20–8–1 | Greg Ford | Submission (rear-naked choke) | Extreme Challenge 14 | February 13, 1998 | 1 | 1:40 | Hammond, Indiana, United States | |
| Loss | 19–8–1 | Jim Czajkowski | Submission (choke) | Extreme Challenge 13 | January 16, 1998 | 1 | 2:33 | Kenosha, Wisconsin, United States | |
| Win | 19–7–1 | Jim Theobald | Submission (armbar) | Extreme Challenge 13 | January 16, 1998 | 1 | 3:48 | Kenosha, Wisconsin, United States | |
| Win | 18–7–1 | Andy Schmidt | TKO (Submission to punches) | Iowa Vale Tudo Championships 1 | December 29, 1997 | 1 | 0:43 | Iowa, United States | |
| Win | 17–7–1 | Ben Pearce | TKO (Submission to punches) | Iowa Vale Tudo Championships 1 | December 29, 1997 | 1 | 0:47 | Iowa, United States | |
| Loss | 16–7–1 | Noe Hernandez | Decision (unanimous) | Extreme Challenge 12 | December 13, 1997 | 1 | 20:00 | Kalamazoo, Michigan, United States | |
| Win | 16–6–1 | Eddie Moore | Submission (rear-naked choke) | Extreme Challenge 12 | December 13, 1997 | 1 | 6:23 | Kalamazoo, Michigan, United States | |
| Win | 15–6–1 | Mike Delaney | Submission (guillotine choke) | Extreme Challenge 11 | November 22, 1997 | 1 | 2:10 | Marshalltown, Iowa, United States | |
| Win | 14–6–1 | Bob Magee | Submission (armbar) | Extreme Challenge 10 | October 4, 1997 | 1 | 1:00 | Des Moines, Iowa, United States | |
| Loss | 13–6–1 | Matt Lindland | Submission (choke) | IFC 6: Battle at Four Bears | September 20, 1997 | 1 | 22:13 | New Town, North Dakota, United States | IFC 6 Tournament Final. |
| Win | 13–5–1 | Paul Moller | KO (punch) | IFC 6: Battle at Four Bears | September 20, 1997 | 1 | 0:14 | New Town, North Dakota, United States | IFC 6 Tournament Semi Final. |
| Win | 12–5–1 | Clayton Miller | Submission (triangle choke) | Iowa Extreme Fighting 1 | September 10, 1997 | 1 | 0:51 | Iowa, United States | |
| Win | 11–5–1 | Dan Croonquist | Submission (neck crank) | Iowa Extreme Fighting 1 | September 10, 1997 | 1 | 2:22 | Iowa, United States | |
| Win | 10–5–1 | Ben Smaldino | Submission (armbar) | Iowa Extreme Fighting 1 | September 10, 1997 | 1 | 0:47 | Iowa, United States | |
| Draw | 9–5–1 | Jeremy Horn | Draw | Extreme Challenge 9 | August 30, 1997 | 1 | 15:00 | Davenport, Iowa, United States | |
| Win | 9–5 | Dennis Reed | Submission (triangle choke) | Extreme Challenge 8 | August 9, 1997 | 1 | 5:19 | Iowa, United States | |
| Loss | 8–5 | Brad Kohler | TKO (Submission to punches) | HOOKnSHOOT: Absolute Fighting Championship 2 | July 19, 1997 | 1 | 52:24 | | |
| Win | 8–4 | Dennis Reed | KO (punch) | Extreme Challenge 7 | June 25, 1997 | 1 | 0:33 | Council Bluffs, Iowa, United States | |
| Win | 7–4 | Matt Andersen | TKO (Submission to punches) | Extreme Challenge 7 | June 25, 1997 | 1 | 3:43 | Council Bluffs, Iowa, United States | |
| Win | 6–4 | Dan Croonquist | Submission (americana) | Ultimate Enticer | June 24, 1997 | 1 | 1:11 | Evansdale, Iowa, United States | |
| Win | 5–4 | August Porquet | TKO (punches) | Extreme Challenge 6 | May 10, 1997 | 1 | 4:21 | Battle Creek, Michigan, United States | |
| Loss | 4–4 | Brian Dunn | Decision (unanimous) | Extreme Challenge 5 | April 18, 1997 | 1 | 15:00 | Waterloo, Iowa, United States | |
| Win | 4–3 | Angelo Rivera | TKO (punches) | Extreme Challenge 5 | April 18, 1997 | 1 | 1:36 | Waterloo, Iowa, United States | |
| Loss | 3–3 | Ryan Jensen | Submission (triangle choke) | Extreme Challenge 4 | February 22, 1997 | 1 | 1:40 | Council Bluffs, Iowa, United States | |
| Win | 3–2 | Dan Croonquist | Submission (armbar) | Extreme Challenge 3 | February 15, 1997 | 1 | 0:50 | Davenport, Iowa, United States | |
| Loss | 2–2 | Scott Morton | Submission (triangle choke) | Extreme Challenge 2 | February 1, 1997 | 1 | 1:46 | Des Moines, Iowa, United States | |
| Win | 2–1 | Clayton Miller | KO (punches and elbows) | Extreme Challenge 1 | November 23, 1996 | 1 | 3:09 | Des Moines, Iowa, United States | |
| Win | 1–1 | Wesley Jamieson | Submission (guillotine choke) | Brawl at the Ballpark 1 | September 1, 1996 | 1 | 4:16 | Davenport, Iowa, United States | |
| Loss | 0–1 | Dave Strasser | Submission (rear-naked choke) | Gladiators 1 | July 26, 1996 | 1 | 3:07 | Davenport, Iowa, United States | |

== Professional boxing record ==
Professional record breakdown
| 75 matches | 25 wins | 48 losses |
| By knockout | 23 | 33 |
| By decision | 2 | 10 |
| By disqualification | 0 | 5 |
| Draws | 2 | |

| Result | Record | Opponent | Type | Round | Date | Location | Notes |
| Loss | 25-48-2 | (United States) Ryan Watson | UD | 4 | 09/08/2019 | Hinckley, Minnesota, United States | 36-40, 36-40, 37-39 |
| Loss | 25-47-2 | (Canada) Mladen Miljas | TKO | 1 | 08/09/2018 | Lawrence, Kansas, United States | |
| Loss | 25-46-2 | (United States) David Latoria | UD | 4 | 15/09/2017 | Rosemont, Illinois, United States | |
| Win | 25-45-2 | (United States) Preston Shane | KO | 1 | 15/07/2017 | Waterloo, Iowa, United States | |
| Draw | 24-45-2 | (United States) Lance Gauch | MD | 4 | 29/04/2017 | Lawrence, Kansas, United States | 38-38, 38-38, 37-39 |
| Loss | 24-45-1 | (United States) Tyson Cobb | KO | 1 | 29/04/2017 | Lawrence, Kansas, United States | |
| Loss | 24-44-1 | (United States) Craig Lewis | TKO | 1 | 07/10/2016 | Covington, Kentucky, United States | |
| Win | 24-43-1 | (United States) Mike Smith | TKO | 1 | 24/09/2016 | Mason City, Iowa, United States | |
| Loss | 23-43-1 | (United States) Byron Polley | DQ | 3 | 10/06/2016 | Saint Joseph, Missouri, United States | Fulton disqualified for excessive holding |
| Loss | 23-42-1 | (Canada) Simon Kean | TKO | 2 | 12/03/2016 | Montreal, Quebec, Canada | |
| Loss | 23-41-1 | (United States) Richard Carmack | UD | 4 | 19/02/2016 | Sloan, Iowa, United States | 37-39, 37-39, 37-39 |
| Win | 23-40-1 | (United States) Van Goodman | UD | 5 | 22/01/2016 | Hinckley, Minnesota, United States | 50-45, 50-45, 50-45 |
| Loss | 22-40-1 | (Canada) Oleksandr Teslenko | DQ | 2 | 28/11/2015 | Dartmouth, Nova Scotia, Canada | |
| Loss | 22-39-1 | (United States) Joey Abell | TKO | 3 | 17/04/2015 | Hinckley, Minnesota, United States | |
| Loss | 22-38-1 | (United States) Byron Polley | SD | 4 | 28/03/2015 | Saint Joseph, Missouri, United States | 38-37, 37-38, 36-39 |
| Win | 22-37-1 | (United States) Blake Breitsprecher | TKO | 2 | 02/08/2014 | Waterloo, Iowa, United States | |
| Loss | 21-37-1 | (United States) Ed Latimore | DQ | 2 | 17/05/2014 | Chester, West Virginia, United States | Fulton was disqualified for excessive holding |
| Loss | 21-36-1 | (United States) Donovan Dennis | TKO | 2 | 28/03/2014 | New Town, North Dakota, United States | |
| Loss | 21-35-1 | (Jamaica) Lenroy Thomas | UD | 4 | 21/03/2014 | Tampa, Florida, United States | 33-40, 33-40, 33-40 |
| Loss | 21-34-1 | (Nigeria) Lateef Kayode | TKO | 2 | 06/12/2013 | Santa Ynez, California, United States | |
| Loss | 21-33-1 | (United States) Gerald Washington | TKO | 1 | 19/10/2013 | Mexico City, Mexico | |
| Win | 21-32-1 | (United States) Van Goodman | UD | 4 | 16/08/2013 | Hinckley, Minnesota, United States | 40-36, 40-36, 40-36 |
| Win | 20-32-1 | (United States) Blake Breitsprecher | TKO | 3 | 27/07/2013 | Des Moines, Iowa, United States | |
| Loss | 19-32-1 | (United States) Jeremy Williams | DQ | 3 | 30/03/2013 | Waterloo, Iowa, United States | Fulton was disqualified for excessive holding |
| Draw | 19-31-1 | (United States) Van Goodman | MD | 4 | 25/01/2013 | Hinckley, Minnesota, United States | 39–37, 38–38, 38–38 |
| Win | 19-31 | (United States) Mike Smith | KO | 1 | 15/12/2012 | Waterloo, Iowa, United States | Smith knocked out at 0:18 of the first round. |
| Loss | 18-31 | (United States) Jordan Shimmell | TKO | 2 | 27/10/2012 | Carlton, Minnesota, United States | Referee stopped the bout at 2:47 of the second round. |
| Win | 18-30 | (United States) Sam Wilcox | TKO | 1 | 08/09/2012 | Davenport, Iowa, United States | Referee stopped the bout at 1:31 of the first round. |
| Loss | 17-30 | (United States) Elijah McCall | TKO | 2 | 21/06/2012 | Elk Grove, Illinois, United States | Referee stopped the bout at 2:10 of the second round. |
| Win | 17-29 | (United States) Nick Capes | TKO | 1 | 02/06/2012 | Davenport, Iowa, United States | Referee stopped the bout at 2:37 of the first round. |
| Loss | 16-29 | (United States) Galen Brown | UD | 4 | 12/05/2012 | Concho, Oklahoma, United States | 34–40, 34–40, 34–40 |
| Loss | 16-28 | (United States) Aaron Green | TKO | 2 | 07/04/2012 | Superior, Wisconsin, United States | Referee stopped the bout at 2:49 of the second round. |
| Win | 16-27 | (United States) Preston Shane | KO | 2 | 10/03/2012 | Waterloo, Iowa, United States | Shane knocked out at 2:15 of the second round. |
| Loss | 15-27 | (United States) Fres Oquendo | DQ | 2 | 03/03/2012 | Davenport, Iowa, United States | Fulton disqualified at 2:58 of the second round. |
| Win | 15-26 | (United States) Brian Long | KO | 1 | 18/02/2012 | Steamboat Rock, Iowa, United States | Long knocked out at 0:34 of the first round. |
| Loss | 14-26 | (United States) Eugene Hill | UD | 4 | 10/06/2011 | Iowa City, Iowa, United States | 33–40, 33–39, 33–40 |
| Loss | 14-25 | (United States) Rob Calloway | MD | 6 | 06/08/2011 | Kansas City, Kansas, United States | 55–59, 57–57, 55–59 |
| Loss | 14-24 | (United States) John Clark | TKO | 3 | 07/05/2009 | Tulsa, Oklahoma, United States | Referee stopped the bout at 2:45 of the third round. |
| Loss | 14-23 | (United States) Chazz Witherspoon | TKO | 3 | 28/03/2009 | Miami, Oklahoma, United States | Referee stopped the bout at 1:43 of the third round. |
| Loss | 14-22 | (United States) Raphael Butler | TKO | 2 | 04/10/2008 | Rochester, Minnesota, United States | Referee stopped the bout at 2:04 of the second round after being knocked down thrice in the fight. |
| Loss | 14-21 | (United States) Travis Kauffman | TKO | 2 | 19/07/2008 | Saint Joseph, Missouri, United States | Referee stopped the bout at 1:57 of the second round. |
| Loss | 14-20 | (United States) Galen Brown | UD | 6 | 17/05/2008 | Saint Joseph, Missouri, United States | |
| Loss | 14-19 | (United States) Steve Collins | UD | 4 | 02/08/2007 | Houston, Texas, United States | 34–40, 34–40, 34–40 |
| Loss | 14-18 | (United States) Raphael Butler | TKO | 2 | 29/06/2007 | Comstock Park, Michigan, United States | Referee stopped the bout at 1:25 of the second round. |
| Loss | 14-17 | (United States) Lou Savarese | TKO | 3 | 18/01/2007 | Houston, Texas, United States | Referee stopped the bout at 1:31 of the third round. |
| Loss | 14-16 | (Canada) Patrice L'Heureux | TKO | 3 | 30/09/2006 | Montreal, Quebec, Canada | Referee stopped the bout at 2:03 of the third round. |
| Win | 14-15 | (United States) Rory Prazak | TKO | 2 | 15/07/2006 | Manchester, Iowa, United States | Referee stopped the bout at 2:01 of the second round. |
| Loss | 13-15 | (United States) Alonzo Butler | TKO | 2 | 31/05/2006 | (Washington (state)) Airway Heights, Washington, United States | Referee stopped the bout at 1:26 of the second round. |
| Loss | 13-14 | (United States) Travis Walker | TKO | 2 | 23/02/2006 | Lemoore, California, United States | Referee stopped the bout at 1:54 of the second round. |
| Win | 13-13 | (United States) Brandon Quigley | TKO | 1 | 28/01/2006 | Hendrick, Iowa, United States | Referee stopped the bout at 0:43 of the first round. |
| Win | 12-13 | (United States) Bryan Robinson | TKO | 1 | 10/12/2005 | Blairstown, Iowa, United States | Referee stopped the bout at 2:47 of the first round. |
| Loss | 11-13 | (New Zealand) Chauncy Welliver | TKO | 4 | 17/09/2005 | (Washington (state)) Tacoma, Washington, United States | Referee stopped the bout at 1:40 of the fourth round. |
| Loss | 11-12 | (United States) Jeremy Bates | TKO | 1 | 12/08/2005 | Wheeling, West Virginia, United States | |
| Loss | 11-11 | (United States) Thomas Hayes | TKO | 3 | 08/07/2005 | Merrillville, Indiana, United States | Referee stopped the bout at 1:33 of the third round. |
| Loss | 11-10 | (United States) China "The Dragon" Smith | TKO | 3 | 03/06/2005 | Sarasota, Florida, United States | Referee stopped the bout at 1:04 of the third round. |
| Win | 11-9 | (United States) Rory Prazak | KO | 2 | 07/05/2005 | Duluth, Minnesota, United States | Prazak knocked out at 1:30 of the second round. |
| Loss | 10-9 | (Poland) Albert Sosnowski | TKO | 2 | 19/03/2005 | Las Vegas, Nevada, United States | Referee stopped the bout at 1:39 of the second round. |
| Loss | 10-8 | (United States) Rob Calloway | TKO | 2 | 05/02/2005 | Omaha, Nebraska, United States | Referee stopped the bout at 2:55 of the second round. |
| Win | 10-7 | (United States) Don Shea | KO | 1 | 22/01/2005 | Hendrick, Iowa, United States | Shea knocked out at 0:45 of the first round. |
| Win | 9-7 | (United States) Rory Prazak | TKO | 2 | 17/12/2004 | Clive, Iowa, United States | Referee stopped the bout at 2:47 of the second round. |
| Loss | 8-7 | (United States) David Rodriguez | TKO | 1 | 22/10/2004 | El Paso, Texas, United States | Referee stopped the bout at 2:01 of the first round. |
| Win | 8-6 | (United States) Brandon Quigley | TKO | 1 | 16/10/2004 | Waterloo, Iowa, United States | Referee stopped the bout at 2:01 of the first round. |
| Win | 7-6 | (United States) Bryan Robinson | KO | 2 | 30/09/2004 | Altoona, Iowa, United States | Robinson knocked out at 0:29 of the second round. |
| Loss | 6-6 | (United States) Brian Minto | TKO | 2 | 24/06/2004 | Niles, Ohio, United States | |
| Loss | 6-5 | (United States) Chris Koval | TKO | 1 | 23/04/2004 | Wheeling, West Virginia, United States | |
| Win | 6-4 | (United States) Manuel Quiroz | TKO | 1 | 28/02/2004 | Marshalltown, Iowa, United States | Referee stopped the bout at 2:21 of the first round. |
| Loss | 5-4 | (United States) John Poore | TKO | 1 | 11/11/2003 | Philadelphia, Pennsylvania, United States | |
| Win | 5-3 | (United States) Bryan Robinson | TKO | 2 | 10/10/2003 | Osceola, Iowa, United States | Referee stopped the bout at 1:48 of the second round after Robinson was knocked down thrice in the fight. |
| Win | 4-3 | (United States) Kevin Oliver | TKO | 1 | 15/06/2002 | Waterloo, Iowa, United States | Referee stopped the bout at 2:49 of the first round. |
| Win | 3-3 | (United States) Clayton Miller | TKO | 2 | 11/05/2002 | Marshalltown, Iowa, United States | Referee stopped the bout at 0:24 of the second round. |
| Loss | 2-3 | (Denmark) Simon Welms Nielsen | TKO | 1 | 31/03/2000 | Esbjerg, Denmark | Referee stopped the bout at 2:35 of the first round. |
| Loss | 2-2 | (United States) Tye Fields | KO | 1 | 17/02/2000 | Davenport, Iowa, United States | Fulton knocked out at 0:30 of the first round. |
| Win | 2-1 | (United States) Jesse Villagecenter | TKO | 2 | 07/10/1999 | Rochester, Minnesota, United States | |
| Loss | 1-1 | (United States) Jesse Villagecenter | KO | 2 | 24/07/1999 | Mahnomen, Minnesota, United States | |
| Win | 1-0 | (United States) Jamie Schell | KO | 1 | 17/02/1999 | Davenport, Iowa, United States | Schell knocked out at 0:25 of the first round. |

== Bare-knuckle boxing record ==
| Result | Record | Opponent | Type | Round | Date | Location | Notes |
| Loss | 0-1 | (United States) Richard Carmack | TKO | 3 | 30/11/2019 | Topeka, Kansas, United States | Fulton was knocked out at 0:15 in the third round |

== See also ==
- List of male mixed martial artists
