= Travis Walker =

American boxer (born 1979)

Personal information
- Nickname: Freight Train
- Nationality: American
- Born: Travis Walker; June 22, 1979 (age 47) Tallahassee, Florida, U.S.
- Height: 6 ft 4 1/2 in (1.94 m)
- Weight: Heavyweight

Boxing career
- Reach: 82 in (208 cm)
- Stance: Orthodox

Boxing record
- Total fights: 54
- Wins: 39
- Win by KO: 31
- Losses: 14
- Draws: 1

Travis Walker (born June 22, 1979) is an American professional boxer. As an amateur, he won the 2003 National Golden Gloves.

== Amateur career ==
He became the 2003 National Golden Gloves Super Heavyweight Champion beating among others a 17-year-old Travis Kauffman but was in the shadow of the nationally dominant Jason Estrada who beat him three times in the amateurs. His record was 26–8.

== Professional career ==
Known as "Freight Train", Walker turned pro for Goossen in 2004. In 2005 he faced Jason Gavern (record 8–1, well-known sparring partner) on ESPN which ended in a draw. In late 2006, he scored his biggest win, a close majority decision over undefeated amateur nemesis Jason Estrada. In April 2007, Walker fought George Garcia, another undefeated amateur star who had beaten him as an amateur, and won the lightly regarded vacant IBA Americas Heavyweight title by a narrow split decision.

In October 2007, Walker was involved in a controversial fight against another former amateur star in T. J. Wilson when the referee stopped the fight a mere fifteen seconds into the bout. Walker was never knocked down but the referee deemed he was out on his feet. He won the rematch by KO2.

In 2008, he was the first man to knock down undefeated contender Chris Arreola, before getting knocked out himself.

After his fight with Chris Arreola he won two more fights, before being blitzed by Manuel Quezada (KO by 1).

In November 2010, he lost to former WBA champion Ruslan Chagaev, in May 2011 he edged out Alonzo Butler (28–1–1).

On September 8, 2012, he lost to former Light Heavyweight and Cruiserweight champion Tomasz Adamek for the IBF North American title.

== Professional boxing record ==
38 Wins (30 knockouts, 8 decisions), 7 Losses (5 knockouts, 3 decisions), 1 Draw
Result	Record	Opponent	Type	Round	Date	Location	Notes
Loss	28-1-0	(Poland) Mariusz Wach	KO	6 (10)	12/12/2014	MOSiR, Radom, Poland	
Loss	26-5	(United States) Derric Rossy	SD	3	23/02/2013	(United Kingdom) York Hall, London, England	'Prizefighter' Tournament Heavyweight Quarter-Final.
Loss	46-2	(Poland) Tomasz Adamek	TKO	5	08/09/2012	(United States) Newark, New Jersey, U.S.	Won IBF North American heavyweight title
Win	38-4	(Australia) Kali Meehan	TKO	6	07/03/2012	Derwent Entertainment Centre, Hobart, Australia	Won IBF Pan Pacific heavyweight title. RSC, corner threw towel in at same time.
Loss	13-0	(Bulgaria) Kubrat Pulev	UD	12	22/10/2011	Ludwigsburg, Germany	IBF International Heavyweight Title.
Win	14-6	(United States) Stacy Frazier	RTD	2	27/08/2011	(United States) Norcross, Georgia, U.S.	
Win	18-15-4	(United States) Gabe Brown	TKO	4	25/06/2011	(United States) Decatur, Georgia, U.S.	Referee stopped the bout at 3:00 of the fourth round.
Win	28-1-1	(United States) Alonzo Butler	MD	10	14/05/2011	(United States) Atlanta, Georgia, U.S.	NABA USA/IBS US National Heavyweight Titles.
Win	23-10-3	(United States) Darnell Wilson	UD	8	26/02/2011	(United States) Atlanta, Georgia, U.S.	
Loss	26-1-1	(Uzbekistan) Ruslan Chagaev	UD	8	19/11/2010	Hamburg, Germany	
Loss	18-3-3	(Australia) Alex Leapai	TKO	4	30/06/2010	Boondall, Australia	Referee stopped the bout at 2:52 of the fourth round.
Loss	23-1	(United States) Johnathon Banks	TKO	6	20/03/2010	Düsseldorf, Germany	NABF Heavyweight Title. Referee stopped the bout at 1:51 of the sixth round.
Win	--	(United States) John Little	TKO	2	16/12/2009	(United States) Texarkana, Arkansas, U.S.	Referee stopped the bout at 2:16 of the second round.
Win	3-21-2	(United States) Douglas Robertson	TKO	3	14/10/2009	(United States) Texarkana, Arkansas, U.S.	Referee stopped the bout at 2:32 of the third round.
Win	3-0	(United States) Jared Johnson	TKO	2	30/09/2009	(United States) Texarkana, Arkansas, U.S.	Referee stopped the bout at 2:31 of the second round.
Loss	27-4	(United States) Manuel Quezada	KO	1	16/07/2009	(United States) Lemoore, California, U.S.	WBC CABOFE Heavyweight Title. Walker knocked out at 2:57 of the first round.
Win	13-31	(United States) Gary Butler	TKO	2	06/06/2009	(United States) Kinder, Louisiana, U.S.	Referee stopped the bout at 0:53 of the second round.
Win	12-22-1	(United States) "Marvelous" Marvin Hunt	TKO	1	28/03/2009	(United States) Royal Oak, Michigan, U.S.	Referee stopped the bout at 2:23 of the first round.
Win	15-13-2	(United States) Marvin Ray Jones	TKO	1	28/02/2009	(United States) Batesville, Arkansas, U.S.	Referee stopped the bout at 1:26 of the first round.
Loss	25-0	(United States) Chris Arreola	TKO	3	29/11/2008	(United States) Ontario, California, U.S.	WBC Continental Americas/NABF Heavyweight Titles.. Referee stopped the bout at 0:13 of the third round.
Win	8-19-1	(United States) Wallace McDaniel	TKO	1	04/09/2008	(United States) Houston, Texas, U.S.	Referee stopped the bout at 0:27 of the first round.
Win	12-1	(United States) T.J. Wilson	TKO	2	29/02/2008	(United States) Lemoore, California, U.S.	NABF Heavyweight Title. Referee stopped the bout at 1:50 of the second round.
Win	17-12-1	(United States) Ralph West	KO	2	06/12/2007	(United States) Saint Charles, Missouri, U.S.	West knocked out at 2:17 of the second round.
Loss	11-1	(United States) T.J. Wilson	TKO	1	19/10/2007	(United States) West Sacramento, California, U.S.	IBF Americas Heavyweight Title. Referee stopped the bout at 0:15 of the first round.
Win	2-12-1	(United States) Douglas Robertson	KO	1	24/08/2007	(United States) Hinckley, Minnesota, U.S.	Robertson knocked out at 1:11 of the first round.
Win	10-13-1	(United States) Cornelius Ellis	TKO	6	08/06/2007	(United States) Jacksonville, Florida, U.S.	Referee stopped the bout at 2:24 of the sixth round.
Win	13-0	(United States) George Garcia	SD	10	06/04/2007	(United States) Minneapolis, Minnesota, U.S.	IBA Americas Heavyweight Title.
Win	7-0	(United States) Jason Estrada	MD	8	17/11/2006	(United States) San Jacinto, California, U.S.	
Win	12-7-1	(United States) John Clark	TKO	2	Sep 2, 2006	(United States) Los Angeles, California, U.S.	Referee stopped the bout at 2:13 of the second round.
Win	11-13-2	(United States) Andrew Greeley	UD	10	18/08/2006	(United States) Tampa, Florida, U.S.	
Win	11-17-1	(United States) Mike Middleton	TKO	1	30/06/2006	(United States) Atlanta, Georgia, U.S.	Referee stopped the bout at 0:45 of the first round.
Win	13-16-1	(United States) Curtis Taylor	TKO	1	25/05/2006	(United States) Temecula, California, U.S.	Referee stopped the bout at 0:42 of the first round.
Win	6-11-1	(United States) Adam Smith	TKO	1	11/05/2006	(United States) Houston, Texas, U.S.	Referee stopped the bout at 1:20 of the first round.
Win	11-11-2	(United States) Andrew Greeley	SD	6	14/04/2006	(United States) Rancho Mirage, California, U.S.	
Win	13-13	(United States) Travis Fulton	TKO	2	23/02/2006	(United States) Lemoore, California, U.S.	Referee stopped the bout at 1:54 of the second round.
Win	11-17-3	(Mexico) Agustin Corpus	TKO	5	02/12/2005	(United States) Lemoore, California, U.S.	Referee stopped the bout at 2:35 of the fifth round.
Draw	8-1-1	(United States) Jason Gavern	PTS	8	30/09/2005	(United States) Brooks, California, U.S.	
Win	22-52-3	(United States) David Quinn Robinson	KO	1	27/08/2005	(United States) Thief River Falls, Minnesota, U.S.	Robinson knocked out at 2:38 of the first round.
Win	6-8-1	(United States) Kerry Biles	KO	1	06/08/2005	(United States) Palm Springs, California, U.S.	Biles knocked out at 1:51 of the first round.
Win	15-11-2	(United States) Carlton Johnson	TKO	1	09/06/2005	(United States) Temecula, California, U.S.	Referee stopped the bout at 0:48 of the first round.
Win	7-3	(United States) William "Big Will" Cook	KO	2	05/05/2005	(United States) Palm Springs, California, U.S.	Referee stopped the bout at 0:40 of the second round.
Win	7-1	(United States) Carl "Iron Fist" Davis	UD	6	07/04/2005	(United States) Temecula, California, U.S.	60-54, 59-55, 58-56.
Win	29-26-1	(United States) Marcus "Big Tuna" Rhode	TKO	2	11/03/2005	(United States) Saint Paul, Minnesota, U.S.	Referee stopped the bout at 2:00 of the second round.
Win	0-1	(United States) Michael Hamilton	KO	3	20/01/2005	(United States) Houston, Texas, U.S.	Hamilton knocked out at 0:23 of the third round.
Win	3-8-3	(United States) Salvador Farnetti	TKO	2	09/12/2004	(United States) Temecula, California, U.S.	Referee stopped the bout at 1:52 of the second round.
Win	1-0	(United States) Enoch Tucker	KO	1	11/11/2004	(United States) Houston, Texas, U.S.	Tucker knocked out at 2:25 of the first round.
Win	0-1	(United States) John Sargent, Jr.	KO	1	29/10/2004	(United States) Rochester, Minnesota, U.S.	Jr. knocked out at 1:56 of the first round.
Win	2-10-3	(United States) David Johnson	MD	4	23 Sep 2004	(United States) Temecula, California, U.S.	
Win	0-3	(United States) Royphy Solieau	TKO	4	19/08/2004	(United States) Houston, Texas, U.S.	Referee stopped the bout at 0:45 of the fourth round.
Win	0-1	(United States) Ross "Da Boss" Brantley	TKO	1	30/07/2004	(United States) Glendale, Arizona, U.S.	Referee stopped the bout at 2:01 of the first round.
