= Harry Moskowitz =

American mixed martial artist

- Born: July 16, 1968 (age 58); United States
- Other names: Dirty
- Height: 6 ft 5 in (1.96 m)
- Weight: 275 lb (125 kg; 19.6 st)
- Division: Super Heavyweight
- Years active: 1996 - 2003

Mixed martial arts record
- Total: 18
- Wins: 6
- By knockout: 1
- By submission: 1
- By decision: 2
- Unknown: 2
- Losses: 12
- By knockout: 3
- By submission: 7
- By decision: 1
- Unknown: 1

Other information
- Mixed martial arts record from Sherdog

"Dirty" Harry Moskowitz (born July 16, 1968) is an American mixed martial artist. He competed in the Super Heavyweight division. He won his last fight at XFC 1 - Xtreme Fight Club 1 against Johnnie Brown on November 14, 2003.

== Mixed martial arts record ==
Professional record breakdown
18 matches	6 wins	12 losses
By knockout	1	3
By submission	1	7
By decision	2	1
Unknown	2	1

Res.	Record	Opponent	Method	Event	Date	Round	Time	Location	Notes
Win	6–12	Johnnie Brown	Decision	XFC 1: Xtreme Fight Club 1	November 14, 2003	0	0:00	Morgan City, Louisiana, United States	
Loss	5–12	Nathan Sanchez	Submission (strikes)	RCF 21: Reality Combat Fighting 21	September 13, 2003	1	1:10	Chalmette, Louisiana, United States	
Loss	5–11	Johnathan Ivey	Submission (kneebar)	BONO 6: Battle of New Orleans 6	April 26, 2003	1	0:45	Metairie, Louisiana, United States	
Win	5–10	Travis Zupanc	TKO	EC: Extreme Combat	February 7, 2003	0	0:00	Fridley, Minnesota, United States	
Loss	4–10	Dan Severn	Submission (keylock)	RCF 11: Reality Combat Fighting 11	May 10, 2001	1	2:12		
Loss	4–9	Allan Sullivan	Submission (ankle lock)	RSF 2: Reality Submission Fighting 2	January 5, 2001	1	6:49		
Loss	4–8	Travis Fulton	Submission (armbar)	SFC: Submission Fighting Championships 11	August 23, 2000	1	6:28	Collinsville, Illinois, United States	
Loss	4–7	Aaron Brink	TKO (punches)	Rings USA: Rising Stars Block A	July 15, 2000	1	0:47	Orem, Utah, United States	
Win	4–6	Chris Seifert	Decision (unanimous)	WVF: Cage Brawl	April 21, 2000	3	6:00	Slidell, Louisiana, United States	
Win	3–6	Joe Nameth	Submission (punches)	RCF 5: Reality Combat Fighting 5	April 7, 2000	1	0:45	Metairie, Louisiana, United States	
Loss	2–6	Travis Fulton	KO (punches)	HOOKnSHOOT: Horizon	March 20, 1999	1	2:00	Evansville, Indiana, United States	
Loss	2–5	Andre Roberts	KO (elbow)	UFC 17: Redemption	May 15, 1998	1	3:15	Mobile, Alabama, United States	
Loss	2–4	Alex Hunter	Decision (split)	UFC 15: Collision Course	October 17, 1997	1	10:00	Bay St. Louis, Mississippi, United States	
Loss	2–3	Frank Laughing	Submission (exhaustion)	IFC 4: Akwesasane	March 28, 1997	1	7:26	Hogansburg, New York, United States	
Loss	2–2	Wes Gassaway	N/A	IFC 3: International Fighting Championship 3	September 14, 1996	0	0:00	Mobile, Alabama, United States	
Win	2–1	Matt Teu	N/A	IFC 3: International Fighting Championship 3	September 14, 1996	0	0:00	Mobile, Alabama, United States	
Win	1–1	Rob Morris	N/A	IFC 3: International Fighting Championship 3	September 14, 1996	0	0:00	Mobile, Alabama, United States	
Loss	0–1	Gerry Harris	Submission (guillotine choke)	IFC 2: Mayhem in Mississippi	August 23, 1996	1	2:07	Biloxi, Mississippi, United States	

== See also ==
- List of male mixed martial artists
