= Friday Ahunanya =

Nigerian boxer

Personal information
- Nickname: The 13th
- Born: Friday Chinedu Ahunanya; 19 November 1971 (age 54) Port Harcourt, Nigeria
- Height: 6 ft 0 in (1.83 m)
- Weight: Heavyweight

Boxing career
- Stance: Orthodox

Boxing record
- Total fights: 36
- Wins: 24
- Win by KO: 13
- Losses: 8
- Draws: 3
- No contests: 1

Friday Chinedu Ahunanya (born 19 November 1971) is a Nigerian professional boxer. He is a journeyman heavyweight, best known for beating several undefeated prospects and for his appearances on ESPN fight cards.

== Amateur career ==
- 1994: World Cup, Bangkok, Thailand, Heavyweight:
  - Lost to Georgi Kandelaki (Georgia) on points
- 1994: Commonwealth Games, Victoria, Heavyweight:
  - Defeated Roland Raforme (Seychelles) on points
  - Lost to Stephen Gallinger (Canada) on points

== Professional career ==
Known as Friday "The 13th," Ahunanya began his career in 1998 with a good deal of promise, winning his first 16 fights including a victory over undefeated (16–0–1) Nate Jones. In 2001 he lost a decision to undefeated (15–0) Olympian and future titlist Serguei Lyakhovich. In 2002, he handed French Olympian Josue Blocus his first loss.

In 2004, he had his only early loss when hit in the eye in the 4th round by Lance Whitaker. The loss to Whitaker was the beginning of the decline for Ahunanya. He went on to lose to Taurus Sykes in New Mexico, who was not highly regarded in spite of his 22-1-1 record in 2005, arguably the low point of his career.

He then drew with fringe contender Dominick Guinn, and then was competitive in losing efforts against undefeated prospects Sultan Ibragimov (Olympic silver medalist) and Alexander Povetkin (Olympic Gold medalist).

In 2007 he rebounded by handing 19-0 New Zealand prospect Shane Cameron his first loss by knocking him down twice in the 12th and final round. After the second knockdown, the referee intervened and stopped the contest, earning Ahunanya a TKO victory. In 2008 he stopped another undefeated prospect in Alonzo Butler.

Ahunanya lost to David Tua in March 2010 in New Zealand via unanimous decision. However Ahunanya and his manager claimed he should have won, and would have if the fight had been in the USA. After further review it was obvious that David Tua won the fight.

== Professional boxing record ==
24 Wins (13 knockouts, 11 decisions), 9 Losses (1 knockout, 8 decisions), 3 Draws
| Result | Record | Opponent | Type | Round | Date | Location | Notes |
| Loss | 17-0 | (Cuba) Mike Perez | UD | 10 | 30/12/2011 | (United States) Morongo Casino, Resort & Spa, Cabazon, California | |
| Loss | 32-2 | (United States) Chris Arreola | UD | 10 | 09/07/2011 | (United States) Boardwalk Hall, Atlantic City, New Jersey | |
| Loss | 23-17-2 | (Mali) Cisse Salif | UD | 6 | 24/05/2011 | (United States) Santa Monica Pier, Santa Monica, California | |
| Loss | 50-3-1 | (New Zealand) David Tua | UD | 12 | 31/03/2010 | (New Zealand) Trusts Stadium, Auckland | WBO Asia Pacific/Oriental Heavyweight Titles. |
| Win | 26-0-1 | (United States) Alonzo Butler | UD | 10 | 20/06/2008 | (United States) Thomas & Mack Center, Las Vegas, Nevada | |
| Win | 19-0 | (New Zealand) Shane Cameron | TKO | 12 | 02/11/2007 | (New Zealand) Skycity Convention Centre, Auckland | PABA/WBO Asia Pacific/WBA NABA Heavyweight Titles. Referee stopped the bout at 2:14 of the 12th round. |
| Draw | 7-1 | (United States) Franklin Lawrence | SD | 8 | 06/07/2007 | (United States) The Orleans, Las Vegas, Nevada | |
| Win | 21-9-2 | (United States) James Walton | TKO | 2 | 15/06/2007 | (United States) The Orleans, Las Vegas, Nevada | Referee stopped the bout at 2:50 of the second round. |
| Win | 15-23-1 | (United States) Ramon Hayes | UD | 6 | 27/04/2007 | (United States) The Orleans, Las Vegas, Nevada | |
| Loss | 6-0 | (Russia) Alexander Povetkin | UD | 6 | 22/04/2006 | (Germany) SAP Arena, Mannheim | |
| Loss | 17-0 | (Russia) Sultan Ibragimov | TD | 9 | 16/09/2005 | (United States) Gwinnett Center, Duluth, Georgia | WBO Asia Pacific Heavyweight Title. |
| Draw | 25-2 | (United States) Dominick Guinn | PTS | 10 | 22/04/2005 | (United States) Caesars Palace, Las Vegas, Nevada | |
| Loss | 22-1-1 | (United States) Taurus Sykes | UD | 12 | 11/03/2005 | (United States) Lea County Events Center, Hobbs, New Mexico | WBA NABA Heavyweight Title. |
| Loss | 27-2-1 | (United States) Lance Whitaker | TKO | 5 | 17/04/2004 | (United States) Florida State Fairgrounds, Tampa, Florida | WBO NABO/WBA NABA Heavyweight Titles. Referee stopped the bout at 0:42 of the fifth round. |
| Win | 28-15 | (United States) Thomas Williams | KO | 4 | 05/12/2003 | (United States) Seminole Casino, Coconut Creek, Florida | Williams knocked out at 1:34 of the fourth round. |
| Win | 15-17 | (Ivory Coast) Onebo Maxime | UD | 10 | 23/08/2003 | (United States) Seminole Casino, Coconut Creek, Florida | |
| Win | 12-3-1 | (Brazil) Francisco Daniel Silva | TKO | 1 | 28/06/2003 | (United States) Seminole Casino, Coconut Creek, Florida | Referee stopped the bout at 1:13 of the first round. |
| Draw | 32-12 | (United States) Terrence Lewis | PTS | 10 | 28/02/2003 | (United States) The Orleans, Las Vegas, Nevada | |
| Win | 12-0 | (France) Josue Blocus | SD | 10 | 01/06/2002 | (United States) Boardwalk Hall, Atlantic City, New Jersey | |
| Loss | 15-0 | (Belarus) Siarhei Liakhovich | UD | 12 | 17/11/2001 | (United States) Mandalay Bay, Las Vegas, Nevada | WBA NABA Heavyweight Title. |
| Win | 6-8-2 | (United States) James V. Lester | TKO | 1 | 30/06/2001 | (United States) Mandalay Bay, Las Vegas, Nevada | Referee stopped the bout at 2:28 of the first round. |
| Win | 16-0-1 | (United States) Nate Jones | SD | 12 | 03/03/2001 | (United States) Mandalay Bay, Las Vegas, Nevada | WBA NABA Heavyweight Title. |
| Win | 11-5-1 | (United States) Otis Tisdale | UD | 8 | 28/11/2000 | (United States) The Orleans, Las Vegas, Nevada | |
| Win | 3-2-1 | (United States) Ivy Calvin | KO | 5 | 26/10/2000 | (United States) Hollywood Park Racetrack, Inglewood, California | Calvin knocked out at 1:06 of the fifth round. |
| Win | 11-1 | (United States) Derrell Dixon | PTS | 8 | 16/09/2000 | (United States) MGM Grand Garden Arena, Las Vegas, Nevada | |
| Win | 13-25-8 | (United States) Wesley Martin | TKO | 8 | 11/08/2000 | (United States) Paris Las Vegas, Las Vegas, Nevada | |
| Win | 8-6-3 | (Mexico) Agustin Corpus | TKO | 3 | 01/04/2000 | (United States) The Regent, Las Vegas, Nevada | Referee stopped the bout at 2:59 of the third round. |
| Win | 4-2-1 | (United States) Donald Macon | TKO | 1 | Mar 3, 2000 | (United States) Caesars Palace, Las Vegas, Nevada | Referee stopped the bout at 1:40 of the first round. |
| Win | -- | (Mexico) Juan Carlos Maldonado | TKO | 1 | 12/02/1999 | (United States) The Orleans, Las Vegas, Nevada | Referee stopped the bout at 1:51 of the first round. |
| Win | 4-5-1 | (United States) Willie Chapman | UD | 6 | 20/11/1998 | (United States) The Orleans, Las Vegas, Nevada | |
| Win | 3-2-1 | (United States) James V. Lester | PTS | 6 | 31/07/1998 | (United States) Las Vegas, Nevada | |
| Win | -- | Tahavalu Samiu | KO | 3 | 11/07/1998 | (United States) Reno Hilton Casino Resort, Reno, Nevada | |
| Win | -- | (United States) Joe L. Gray | UD | 4 | 15/05/1998 | (United States) The Orleans, Las Vegas, Nevada | |
| Win | 1-0 | (United States) Darrell Morgan | PTS | 4 | 09/04/1998 | (United States) Phoenix, Arizona | |
| Win | 6-0 | (United States) Shane William Heavyrunner | TKO | 4 | 20/03/1998 | (United States) The Orleans, Las Vegas, Nevada | Referee stopped the bout at 2:22 of the fourth round. |
| Win | -- | (United States) Larry Wilson | TKO | 1 | 27/02/1998 | (United States) The Orleans, Las Vegas, Nevada | Referee stopped the bout at 1:18 of the first round. |
