= Jason Estrada =

American boxer (born 1980)

Personal information
- Nickname: Big Six
- Born: Jason Moses Estrada; November 30, 1980 (age 45) Providence, Rhode Island, U.S.
- Height: 6 ft 1 in (1.85 m)
- Weight: Heavyweight

Boxing career
- Stance: Orthodox

Boxing record
- Total fights: 27
- Wins: 20
- Win by KO: 6
- Losses: 6
- Draws: 0
- No contests: 1
Medal record
Men's boxing
Representing the United States
Pan American Games
Gold medal – first place	Santo Domingo 2003	Super Heavyweight

Jason Moses Estrada (born November 30, 1980) is an American former professional boxer who competed from 2004 to 2015. As an amateur, he competed at the 2004 Olympic Games in the super heavyweight division. He also won the gold medal at the 2003 Pan American Games. He is currently retired and owns and runs BigSix Boxing Academy located in Providence RI.

== Professional career ==
Known as "Big Six", Estrada turned professional in 2004 and won fifteen of his first sixteen bouts, with one no-contest. His current record is 20–4. Jason makes his home in Providence, Rhode Island.

Jason lost by decision to 2004 Olympic Gold Medalist Alexander Povetkin on April 4, 2009, in Düsseldorf, Germany. Estrada's last fought on November 10, 2012.

== Training career ==
Estrada owns Big Six Boxing Academy in Providence, Rhode Island and co-trained Sam Hyde for his victorious debut on the undercard of 2 Fights 1 Night in 2022. Estrada also co-trained YouTuber Brandon Buckingham who won in the first round by stoppage against fellow YouTuber Ice Poseidon in 2022.

== Promoting career ==
Estrada is part owner of the promotional company, Big Six Entertainment, LLC formed in 2011.

== Personal life ==
Estrada is half-Puerto Rican, and he has two children. A son named Lennox and a daughter named Annalise

== Amateur career ==
- Three time United States amateur super heavyweight gold medalist (2001, 2002, 2003)(set record for first super heavyweight to three-peat)
- Three time National PAL amateur super heavyweight gold medalist (2001, 2002, 2003)
- Three time National Challenge super heavyweight gold medalist (2001, 2002, 2003)(set record for first boxer to three-peat)
- United States amateur heavyweight silver medalist (2000)
- United States amateur heavyweight bronze medalist (1999)
- Two time National Junior Olympics gold medalist, 165 and 201 lbs (1996, 1997)
- National Junior Police Athletic League gold medalist (1997)
- 2003 Male Boxer of the Year by USA Boxing
- Gold medalist at the 2003 Pan American Games

Estrada's results as a United States super heavyweight representative at the 2004 Athens Olympics were:

- Defeated Ma'afu Hawke (Tonga) 30–11
- Lost to Michel López Núñez (Cuba) 7–21

== Professional boxing record ==
20 Wins (6 knockouts, 14 decisions), 4 Losses (1 knockout, 3 decisions), 1 No Contest
Result	Record	Opponent	Type	Round	Date	Location	Notes
Win	21–4	(United States) Galen Brown	TKO	5	2012-11-10	(United States) Rhode Island Convention Center, Providence, Rhode Island	
Win	20–4	(Puerto Rico) Alex Gonzales	UD	8	2012-06-29	(United States) Rhode Island Convention Center, Providence, Rhode Island	
Win	19–4	(United States) Dominique Alexander	TKO	2	2012-03-09	(United States) Rhode Island Convention Center, Providence, Rhode Island	Referee stopped the bout at 1:29 of the second round.
Win	18–4	(United States) Joseph Rabotte	UD	8	2011-12-09	(United States) West Warwick Civic Center, West Warwick, Rhode Island	
Loss	17–4	(United States) Franklin Lawrence	TKO	9	2011-01-29	(United States) Turning Stone Resort & Casino, Verona, New York	WBC CABOFE Heavyweight Title. Referee stopped the bout at 2:44 of the ninth round.
Loss	17–3	(Poland) Tomasz Adamek	UD	12	2010-02-06	(United States) Prudential Center, Newark, New Jersey	IBF International Heavyweight Title.
Win	17–2	(United States) Zuri Lawrence	TKO	7	2009-09-02	(United States) Mohegan Sun Grandstand, Syracuse, New York	Referee stopped the bout at 2:33 of the seventh round.
Loss	16–2	(Russia) Alexander Povetkin	UD	10	2009-04-04	(Germany) Burg-Waechter Castello, Düsseldorf	
Win	16–1	(United States) Derek Bryant	UD	8	2008-11-29	(United States) Twin River Casino, Lincoln, Rhode Island	
Win	15–1	(United States) Domonic Jenkins	UD	8	2008-08-29	(United States) Mohegan Sun, Uncasville, Connecticut	
Win	14–1	(United States) Moultrie Witherspoon	TKO	7	2008-05-23	(United States) Twin River Casino, Lincoln, Rhode Island	Referee stopped the bout at 1:38 of the seventh round.
Win	13–1	(United States) Lance Whitaker	UD	10	2008-04-04	(United States) Twin River Casino, Lincoln, Rhode Island	
Win	12–1	(United States) Charles Shufford	UD	10	2008-01-25	(United States) Foxwoods, Mashantucket, Connecticut	
Win	11–1	(United States) James Northey	TKO	4	2007-10-12	(United States) Twin River Casino, Lincoln, Rhode Island	Referee stopped the bout at the end of the fourth round.
Win	10–1	(United States) Robert Hawkins	UD	6	2007-05-11	(United States) Twin River Casino, Lincoln, Rhode Island	
Win	9–1	(United States) Zack Page	UD	6	2007-04-06	(United States) Mohegan Sun, Uncasville, Connecticut	
Loss	8–1	(United States) Travis Walker	MD	8	2006-11-17	(United States) Soboba Casino, San Jacinto, California	
Win	8–0	(United States) Maurice Wheeler	UD	8	2006-09-23	(United States) Connecticut Convention Center, Hartford, Connecticut	
Win	7–0	(United States) Robert Wiggins	UD	10	2006-05-18	(United States) Rhode Island Convention Center, Providence, Rhode Island	
Win	6–0	(Cuba) Yanqui Diaz	NC	1	2006-02-13	(United States) Dunkin' Donuts Center, Providence, Rhode Island	
Win	5–0	(United States) Najee Shaheed	UD	6	2005-11-23	(United States) Rhode Island Convention Center, Providence, Rhode Island	
Win	4–0	(United States) Earl Ladson	UD	6	2005-08-26	(United States) Rhode Island Convention Center, Providence, Rhode Island	
Win	3–0	(United States) Demetrice King	UD	4	2005-06-17	(United States) Dunkin' Donuts Center, Providence, Rhode Island	
Win	2–0	(United States) Jerry Simpson	KO	2	2005-04-01	(United States) City Wide Fieldhouse, New Haven, Connecticut	Simpson knocked out at 2:15 of the second round.
Win	1–0	(Puerto Rico) Joseph Kenneth Reyes	UD	4	2004-12-10	(United States) Foxwoods, Mashantucket, Connecticut	

Awards and achievements
Preceded by T.J. Wilson	United States Amateur Super Heavyweight Champion; 2001–2003	Succeeded by Mike Wilson
