= Charles Shufford =

American boxer

Personal information
- Born: Charles Lamont Shufford, Jr. February 3, 1973 (age 53) Martinsville, VA U.S.
- Height: 6 ft 3 in (191 cm)
- Weight: Heavyweight

Boxing career
- Reach: 80 in (203 cm)
- Stance: orthodox

Boxing record
- Total fights: 29
- Wins: 20
- Win by KO: 9
- Losses: 8
- Draws: 1
- No contests: 0

Charles Lamont Shufford, Jr. (born February 3, 1973) is an American former professional boxer. He challenged once for the WBO world heavyweight title in 2001.

== Amateur career ==
Charles Shufford, a nephew of former welterweight contender Horace Shufford, was considered a star of Las Vegas amateur boxing, frequently fighting at Golden Gloves tournaments and Olympic trials. Shufford had 35 (?) amateur fights at super heavyweight (no exact record given), which included fights against Michael Grant (most notably in 1993) and Lance Whitaker, famously beating Whitaker at 1996 Olympic trials, before turning professional in 1996.

== Professional career ==
Shufford made his professional debut at November 11, 1996, defeating Kirk Holyfield by first-round TKO. Within five years, Shufford compiled 17–1 record that included back-to-back wins over Jimmy Thunder by seventh-round TKO and rising star Lamon Brewster via unanimous decision.

These wins lined him up for a shot at the WBO world heavyweight title against Wladimir Klitschko. For the bout Shufford weighed in at 234 lbs., dropping 17 pounds compared to his last bout. Shufford, having played George Foreman opposite Will Smith in the 2001 film Ali, entered the ring with Smith by his side. Shufford was knocked down three times, once in round two, once in round three (both times with a straight right hand) and in round six with a left hook, with referee stopping the bout after the third knockdown. According to punch stats, Klitschko landed 58 of 262 punches (22%) and Shufford connected on 16 of 190 (8%).

After that, Shufford was not able to stay in the heavyweight title scene. He remained inactive for over a year before returning to the ring against Marcellus Brown, winning by unanimous decision. He then beat Elieser Castillo but lost to Lawrence Clay-Bey and Jameel McCline. After losing to a rising star Samuel Peter by one-sided unanimous decision, Shufford was inactive for two years, and fought only sporadically since. He went 0–2–1 in his last three fights with a draw against Kelvin Davis and losses to Malik Scott and Jason Estrada.

== Professional boxing record ==
20 Wins (9 knockouts, 11 decisions), 8 Losses (2 knockouts, 6 decisions), 1 Draw
| Result | Record | Opponent | Type | Round | Date | Location | Notes |
| Loss | 20-8-1 | (United States) Jason Estrada | UD | 10 | 25/01/2008 | (United States) Mashantucket, Connecticut, U.S. | |
| Loss | 20-7-1 | (United States) Malik Scott | UD | 10 | 04/05/2007 | (United States) Las Vegas, Nevada, U.S. | |
| Draw | 20-6-1 | (United States) Kelvin Davis | PTS | 6 | 07/07/2006 | (United States) Hyannis, Massachusetts, U.S. | |
| Loss | 20-6 | (Nigeria) Samuel Peter | UD | 10 | 17/05/2004 | (United States) Las Vegas, Nevada, U.S. | |
| Loss | 20-5 | (Mexico) Gilbert Martinez | SD | 10 | 25/10/2003 | (United States) Tunica, Mississippi, U.S. | |
| Win | 20-4 | (United States) Willie Chapman | MD | 10 | 12/07/2003 | (United States) Stateline, Nevada, U.S. | |
| Loss | 19-4 | (United States) Jameel McCline | TKO | 3 | 09/05/2003 | (United States) Atlantic City, New Jersey, U.S. | Referee stopped the bout at 2:39 of the third round. |
| Loss | 19-3 | (United States) Lawrence Clay Bey | UD | 10 | 03/01/2003 | (United States) Norman, Oklahoma, U.S. | |
| Win | 19-2 | (Cuba) Elieser Castillo | UD | 12 | 13/10/2002 | (United States) Choctaw, Mississippi, U.S. | IBA Americas Heavyweight Title. |
| Win | 18-2 | (United States) Marcellus Brown | UD | 6 | 21/09/2002 | (United States) Las Vegas, Nevada, U.S. | |
| Loss | 17-2 | (Ukraine) Wladimir Klitschko | TKO | 6 | 04/08/2001 | (United States) Las Vegas, Nevada, U.S. | WBO World Heavyweight Title. Referee stopped the bout at 2:55 of the sixth round. Shufford was knocked down thrice in the bout. |
| Win | 17-1 | (United States) Rodney McSwain | TKO | 5 | 17/06/2001 | (United States) West Wendover, Utah, U.S. | |
| Win | 16-1 | (United States) Lamon Brewster | UD | 10 | 21/10/2000 | (United States) Detroit, Michigan, U.S. | |
| Win | 15-1 | (New Zealand) Jimmy Thunder | TKO | 8 | 07/09/2000 | (United States) Baltimore, Maryland, U.S. | Thunder failed to come out for the ninth round. |
| Win | 14-1 | (United States) Derrick Banks | UD | 10 | 05/05/2000 | (United States) Las Vegas, Nevada, U.S. | |
| Loss | 13-1 | (United States) Robert Davis | UD | 10 | 18/02/2000 | (United States) Atlantic City, New Jersey, U.S. | |
| Win | 13-0 | (United States) Jeff Lally | TKO | 2 | 22/01/2000 | (United States) Las Vegas, Nevada, U.S. | Referee stopped the bout at 0:55 of the second round. |
| Win | 12-0 | (United States) Anthony Moore | UD | 8 | 04/11/1999 | (United States) Worley, Idaho, U.S. | |
| Win | 11-0 | (United States) Bruce Bellocchi | TKO | 4 | 17/06/1999 | (United States) Worley, Idaho, U.S. | Referee stopped the bout at 2:57 of the fourth round. |
| Win | 10-0 | (United States) Louis Monaco | UD | 6 | 06/05/1999 | (United States) Tacoma, Washington, U.S. | |
| Win | 9-0 | (United States) Terry Verners | TKO | 1 | 02/11/1998 | (United States) Phoenix, Arizona, U.S. | Referee stopped the bout at 2:19 of the first round after Verners had been knocked down twice in the bout. |
| Win | 8-0 | (Samoa) Tui Toia | KO | 1 | 12/05/1998 | (United States) Kansas City, Missouri, U.S. | |
| Win | 7-0 | (United States) Derrick Ryals | DQ | 3 | 09/04/1998 | (United States) Phoenix, Arizona, U.S. | |
| Win | 6-0 | (United States) Felton Hamilton | SD | 6 | 19/12/1997 | (United States) New York City, U.S. | |
| Win | 5-0 | (United States) Thomas Allen | KO | 3 | 14/11/1997 | (United States) Phoenix, Arizona, U.S. | |
| Win | 4-0 | (United States) Anthony Curry | UD | 4 | 28/05/1997 | (United States) Las Vegas, Nevada, U.S. | |
| Win | 3-0 | (United States) Roberto Ramirez | TKO | 2 | 29/04/1997 | (United States) Tempe, Arizona, U.S. | Referee stopped the bout at 2:27 of the second round after Ramirez had been knocked down thrice in the bout. |
| Win | 2-0 | (United States) Willie Chapman | UD | 4 | 11/01/1997 | (United States) Las Vegas, Nevada, U.S. | |
| Win | 1-0 | (Canada) Kirk Holyfield | TKO | 1 | 30/11/1996 | (United States) Las Vegas, Nevada, U.S. | Referee stopped the bout at 2:59 of the first round. |

== Other ==
Perhaps Shufford's most notable accomplishment has been outside of the ring, playing the role of George Foreman in the 2001 film Ali.
