= Demetrice King =

American boxer

Personal information
- Born: Demetrice Deonta King; January 21, 1985 (age 41) Jackson, Michigan, U.S.
- Height: 1.80 m (5 ft 11 in)
- Weight: Heavyweight

Boxing career
- Reach: 188 cm (74 in)
- Stance: Orthodox

Boxing record
- Total fights: 35
- Wins: 15
- Win by KO: 13
- Losses: 20

Demetrice King (born January 21, 1985) is an American former professional boxer who competed from 2003 to 2011. He holds a notable win over future world heavyweight champion Bermane Stiverne.

== Professional career ==
King made his professional debut on September 20, 2003, defeating Matthew Fendley via first-round technical knockout (TKO) in Kalamazoo, Michigan. He then had two wins (both by KO) and two losses (both by points decision) before defeating Joe Johnson at the International Convention Center in Sarasota. Next he lost via points decision to Zuri Lawrence at the id-Hudson Civic Center in Poughkeepsie.

After the bout with Lawrence, he defeated Mujaheed Moore (via KO) and Kevin Montiy, suffered a points decision loss to Terry Smith, and knocked out Val Smith at the State Fairgrounds in Detroit on February 18, 2005.

Next, King fought then IBU heavyweight champion and future WBO heavyweight champion Shannon Briggs at Madison Square Garden in New York on March 3, 2005. He lost the fight via TKO in the second round. Briggs was the first boxer to stop King.

After the bout with Briggs, King suffered a number of defeats, at the hands of boxers including Jason Estrada, Chazz Witherspoon, Derric Rossy, and Kevin Johnson, losing via points decision each time.

Following his loss to Kevin Johnson, King had a winning streak of five, all by knockout, defeating, among others, future WBC heavyweight champion Bermane Stiverne in 2007. This winning streak brought his record to 14–15.

He next suffered a points decision loss to Michael Grant in National Guard Armory in Philadelphia, and on August 29, 2008, he lost a rematch with Raymond Olubowale (whom he had defeated via KO in October of the previous year), also via points decision.

He defeated the then undefeated Australian prospect Bowie Tupou via KO in the second round in their bout at Agua Caliente Casino in Rancho Mirage.

By November 2009, King was ranked the 40th heavyweight in the world, and the 18th in the United States.

After his win over Tupou, he was set to fight Fres Oquendo for the NABA and vacant USBA heavyweight titles. The 12-round fight took place at the Horseshoe Casino in Hammond on February 20, 2010. King failed to answer the bell for the tenth round.

His last two fights were against Tor Hamer and David Tua, losing both via points decision.

King was knocked out only once in his career, by Shannon Briggs in their Madison Square Garden bout. He has stated that some of his points decision losses were "very controversial".

== Professional boxing record ==
15 Wins (13 knockouts), 20 Losses (1 knockout)
Result	Record	Opponent	Type	Round	Date	Location	Notes
Loss	15-20	(New Zealand) David Tua	UD	10	2011-03-19	TelstraClear Pacific, Manukau City, New Zealand	
Loss	15-19	(United States) Tor Hamer	UD		2010-12-01	(United States) BB King Blues Club & Grill, New York City, New York, U.S.	
Loss	15-18	(United States) Fres Oquendo	RTD	9 (12)	2010-02-20	(United States) Horseshoe Casino, Hammond, Indiana, U.S.	For WBA–NABA and vacant IBF–USBA heavyweight titles
Win	15-17	(Australia) Bowie Tupou	KO	2 (8), 0:52	2009-08-01	(United States) Agua Caliente Casino, Rancho Mirage, California, U.S.	
Loss	14-17	(Canada) Raymond Olubowale	UD		2008-08-29	Casino Rama, Rama, Ontario, Canada	
Loss	14-16	(United States) Michael Grant	UD	8	2008-07-11	(United States) National Guard Armory, Philadelphia, Pennsylvania, U.S.	
Win	14-15	(Canada) Raymond Olubowale	KO		2007-10-27	Casino Rama, Rama, Ontario, Canada	
Win	13-15	(United States) Edward Slater	TKO		2007-08-24	(United States) Jackson County Fairgrounds, Jackson, Michigan, U.S.	
Win	12-15	(Canada) Bermane Stiverne	TKO	4 (8), 1:59	2007-07-07	(United States) Harbour Yard Arena, Bridgeport, Connecticut, U.S.	
Win	11-15	(United States) Matthew Eckerly	KO		2007-04-21	(United States) The Harry Hill Center, Lansing, Michigan, U.S.	
Win	10-15	(United States) Jason Weiss	KO		2007-02-17	(United States) Centre Point, Lansing, Michigan, U.S.	
Loss	9-15	(United States) Kevin Johnson	UD	6	2006-10-11	(United States) Westchester County Center, White Plains, New York, U.S.	
Loss	9-14	(United States) Derric Rossy	UD	6	2006-07-20	(United States) Grand Ballroom, New York City, New York, U.S.	
Loss	9-13	(Cameroon) Paul Mbongo	UD		2006-03-11	Montreal Casino, Montreal, Quebec, Canada	
Loss	9-12	(United States) David Polk	MD		2005-12-16	(United States) Gray's Armory, Cleveland, Ohio, U.S.	
Loss	9-11	(United States) Chazz Witherspoon	UD	6	2005-11-05	(United States) Caesars Tahoe, Stateline, Nevada, U.S.	
Win	9-10	(United States) Corey Gregory	KO		2005-10-22	(United States) Wings Stadium, Kalamazoo, Michigan, U.S.	
Loss	8-10	(Canada) David Cadieux	UD	8	2005-10-01	Delta Hotel, Trois-Rivières, Quebec, Canada	
Loss	8-9	(United States) Alonzo Butler	UD	4	2005-08-13	(United States) Golden Gloves Arena, Knoxville, Tennessee, U.S.	
Win	8-8	(United States) Lamar Stephens	TKO		2005-07-22	(United States) Allstate Arena, Rosemont, Illinois, U.S.	
Loss	7-8	(United States) Jason Estrada	UD	4	2005-06-17	(United States) Theatre at Dunkin Donuts Center, Providence, Rhode Island, U.S.	
Loss	7-7	(Canada) Art Binkowski	UD		2005-05-14	Montreal Casino, Montreal, Quebec, Canada	
Loss	7-6	(United States) Shannon Briggs	TKO	2 (6), 1:49	2005-03-03	(United States) Madison Square Garden, New York City, New York, U.S.	
Win	7-5	(United States) Val Smith	KO		2005-02-18	(United States) Michigan State Fairgrounds, Detroit, Michigan, U.S.	
Loss	6-5	(United States) Terry Smith	UD		2004-12-04	(United States) Barton Coliseum, Little Rock, Arkansas, U.S.	
Win	6-4	(United States) Kevin Montiy	MD		2004-11-19	(United States) Michigan State Fairgrounds, Detroit, Michigan, U.S.	
Win	5-4	(United States) Mujaheed Moore	KO		2004-10-08	(United States) DeCarlo's Banquet Center, Warren, Michigan, U.S.	
Loss	4-4	(United States) Zuri Lawrence	UD	6	2004-08-24	(United States) Mid-Hudson Civic Center, Poughkeepsie, New York, U.S.	
Win	4-3	(United States) Joe Johnson	UD		2004-06-25	(United States) International Convention Center, Sarasota, Florida, U.S.	
Loss	3-3	(Ghana) Abraham Okine	UD		2004-05-15	(United States) David Lawrence Center, Pittsburgh, Pennsylvania, U.S.	
Loss	3-2	(United States) Billy Douglas	UD		2004-04-30	(United States) The Hoop, Columbus, Ohio, U.S.	
Win	3-1	(United States) Brian Green	KO		2004-04-17	(United States) Marshall Activity Center, Battle Creek, Michigan, U.S.	
Win	2-1	(United States) James Bailey	KO		2004-03-27	(United States) Marshall Street Armory, Lansing, Michigan, U.S.	
Loss	1-1	(United States) George Crawford	UD		2003-10-31	(United States) DeltaPlex, Grand Rapids, Michigan, U.S.	
Win	1-0	(United States) Matthew Fendley	TKO		2003-09-20	(United States) Wings Stadium, Kalamazoo, Michigan, U.S.	
