= Alonzo Butler =

American heavyweight boxer (1979–2024)

Personal information
- Nickname: Big Zo
- Born: Alonzo Butler; October 30, 1979 Chattanooga, Tennessee, U.S.
- Died: October 28, 2024 (aged 44) Knoxville, Tennessee, U.S.
- Height: 6 ft 3 in (191 cm)
- Weight: 250–245 lb (113–111 kg)

Boxing career
- Weight class: Heavyweight
- Stance: Orthodox

Boxing record
- Total fights: 40
- Wins: 34
- Win by KO: 25
- Losses: 3
- Draws: 2
- No contests: 1

Alonzo Butler (October 30, 1979 – October 28, 2024) was an American heavyweight boxer. At the height of his career, Butler went unbeaten for 26 bouts and would finish his career with 34 wins. He would later become the sparring partner of world heavyweight champion Deontay Wilder, preparing him for his world championship bouts.

== Background ==
Butler was born in Chattanooga, Tennessee, where he described growing up in the "projects". He later moved to Knoxville, where he worked at the Budweiser factory until 4 a.m. stacking beer to earn enough to support his boxing training.

Butler committed to play football at Middle Tennessee State University. He later chose a boxing career over football.

In 2006, he signed with Art Pelullo to a promotional contract. At the time, he was managed and trained by Ace Miller. After a string of undefeated bouts, he was named the Greater Knoxville Sports Hall of Fame Professional Athlete of the year in 2006. The winning streak made waves in the boxing world at the time, with many speculating that Butler could be the sport's next star.

In May 2007, Butler defeated Ray West with a knockout in the first round.

In 2008, an unbeaten Butler was matched with Friday Ahunanya for a bout in Las Vegas. At the time, his record was 26–0–1. Prior to the match, he had taken nearly a year off of boxing to heal from a detached retina suffered in training. Ahunanya took advantage, pummeling Butler in his left eye until it was swollen shut. Butler lost the match after ten rounds.

Butler returned to boxing over a year later, but he would not be able to match his earlier record, after a disappointing loss to Travis Walker by majority decision in 2011 for the WBA-NABA heavyweight title. Butler knocked Walker down in the first round of the fight but lost on points.

Butler's next fight, a planned 2011 bout in Mexico to Chris Arreola went forward with fighter Raphael Butler instead. Butler had one fight outside the United States, when he unsuccessfully faced Brice Ritani Coe in New Zealand in 2014.

Butler was the long-time sparring partner for eventual World boxing heavyweight champion Deontay Wilder, helping the boxer prepare for the Olympic Games and for his WBC heavyweight bouts. Wilder described Butler as the toughest sparring partner he was ever matched against, describing him:

"'Big Zo' was the fastest heavyweight I've ever seen, with his size, he was a solid 250 lbs, but he could move. If he had better management and handling he could've been heavyweight champion of the world...Alonzo was the man, he was the first guy that I ever felt a body shot from and I learned a lot from him during that time."

In 2016, Butler fought Roberto White to a win in his hometown of Knoxville. Later that year, he would fight Fred Latham to a close draw by split decision for the USA Tennessee State Heavyweight finals. Butler fought at a heavy weight of 312 lbs. In 2020, he fought twice, winning both bouts to Jesus Martinez Torres (at 295.5 lb (134.0 kg)) and to Ron Guerrero respectively.

In 2021, he looked to make his professional comeback, enlisting promoter Don King in an effort to return to the ring, despite his age. Butler fought his last bout against Brandon Spencer in Myrtle Beach on August 28, 2021. He won by unanimous decision after eight rounds.

He died in Knoxville, Tennessee, on October 28, 2024, 2 days before his 45th birthday.

== Professional record ==
40 fights, 34 wins (25 knockouts), 3 losses (0 knockouts), 2 draws, 1 no contest
| Result | Record | Opponent | Type | Round, time | Date | Location | Notes |
| Win | 31-3-1 (1) | (United States) Roberto White | KO | 1 (4), 1:00 | 2016-01-30 | (United States) Knoxville, Tennessee | |
| Win | 30–3–1 (1) | (United States) Marvin Hunt | TKO | 1 (6), 0:54 | 2015-10-10 | (United States) Johnson City, Tennessee | |
| Loss | 29–3–1 (1) | (Australia) Brice Ritani Coe | SD | 3 | 2014-06-04 | The Trusts Arena, Auckland, New Zealand | |
| Win | 29–2–1 (1) | (United States) Louis Monaco | KO | 1 (6), 2:03 | 2013-12-14 | (United States) Mustang Fitness Oak Ridge, North Carolina | |
| Loss | 28–2–1 (1) | (United States) Travis Walker | MD | 10 | 2011-05-14 | (United States) AmericasMart Bldg 3, Atlanta, Georgia | For vacant WBA-NABA USA Heavyweight title. |
| Win | 28–1–1 (1) | (United States) Willie Perryman | TKO | 2 (6), 1:22 | 2009-12-19 | (United States) Cotton Eyed Joe, Knoxville, Tennessee | |
| Win | 27–1–1 (1) | (United States) Douglas Robertson | TKO | 1 (6), 1:39 | 2009-08-07 | (United States) National Guard Armory, Columbia, Tennessee | |
| Loss | 26–1–1 (1) | (Nigeria) Friday Ahunanya | UD | 10 | 2008-06-20 | (United States) Thomas & Mack Center, Las Vegas, Nevada | |
| Win | 26–0–1 (1) | (United States) Ralph West | TKO | 1 (10), 2:19 | 2007-05-30 | (United States) Northern Quest Casino, Airway Heights, Washington | |
| Win | 25–0–1 (1) | (United States) James Walton | UD | 10 | 2007-02-16 | (United States) Wynn Resort, Las Vegas, Nevada | |
| NC | 24–0–1 (1) | (United States) Troy Beets | ND | 2 (10) | 2007-01-15 | (United States) Northern Quest Casino, Airway Heights, Washington | |
| Win | 24–0–1 | (United States) Maurice Wheeler | UD | 8 | 2006-08-09 | (United States) Foxwoods Resort, Mashantucket, Connecticut | |
| Win | 23–0–1 | (United States) Travis Fulton | TKO | 2 (8), 1:26 | 2006-05-31 | (United States) Northern Quest Casino, Airway Heights, Washington | |
| Win | 22–0–1 | (United States) Zack Page | TKO | 5 (8), 3:00 | 2006-04-29 | (United States) Foxwoods Resort, Mashantucket, Connecticut | |
| Win | 21–0–1 | (United States) Terry Porter | KO | 3 (6), 0:40 | 2006-02-17 | (United States) FedEx Forum, Memphis, Tennessee | |
| Win | 20–0–1 | (United States) Cornelius Ellis | UD | 6 | 2006-02-11 | (United States) Knoxville, Tennessee | |
| Win | 19-0-1 | (United States) Andrew Greeley | TKO | 5 | 2005-10-15 | (United States) Isle of Capri Casino, Lula, Mississippi | |
| Win | 18-0-1 | (United States) Demetrice King | UD | 4 | 2005-08-13 | (United States) Golden Glove Arena, Knoxville, Tennessee | |
| Win | 17-0-1 | (United States) Brandon Cabell | UD | 4 | 2005-04-16 | (United States) Golden Glove Arena, Knoxville, Tennessee | |
