= T. J. Wilson (boxer) =

American boxer

T. J. Edward Wilson (born February 13, 1975) is an American heavyweight boxer who won the U.S. Amateur Super Heavyweight championship in 2000.

== Early years ==
TJ Edward Wilson Jr was born February 13, 1975, in Atlanta, Georgia, where he competed as an amateur boxer. A tall southpaw Wilson had a successful amateur career. The counter puncher was an Olympic alternate in 1996 and was the American boxer at the World Championships 1997 where he lost early to eventual runner-up Alexis Rubalcaba.

He crowned his career with a win at the United States amateur (AAU) Super Heavyweight championships in 2000. He beat 1999 national champion Calvin Brock in the Olympic qualification, too, but lost the rematch 5:6 again having to settle for alternate. He also beat Dominic Guinn in the amateurs.

== Professional career ==
He turned pro afterwards but suffered a major disappointment getting knocked out by clubfighter Willie Chapman.

In 2007 he knocked out undefeated prospect Travis Walker in just 15 seconds. He lost the rematch by knockout.

As of February 2008 Wilson's professional record was 12-2 with 8 knockouts.

Preceded by Calvin Brock	United States Amateur Super Heavyweight Champion; 2000	Succeeded by Jason Estrada
