= Wladimir Klitschko vs. Lamon Brewster II =

Professional boxing match

- Date: 7 July 2007
- Venue: Kolnarena, Cologne, North Rhine-Westphalia, Germany
- Title on the line: IBF/IBO Heavyweight Championship

Tale of the tape
Boxer	(Ukraine) Wladimir Klitschko	(United States) Lamon Brewster
Nickname	"Dr. Steelhammer"	"Relentless"
Hometown	Kyiv, Kyiv Oblast, Ukraine	Los Angeles, California, USA
Pre-fight record	49–3 (43 KO)	33–3 (29 KO)
Age	31 years, 3 months	34 years, 1 month
Height	6 ft 6 in (198 cm)	6 ft 2 in (188 cm)
Weight	243 1/2 lb (110 kg)	228 1/4 lb (104 kg)
Style	Orthodox	Orthodox
Recognition	IBF/IBO; Heavyweight Champion; The Ring; No. 1 Ranked Heavyweight	IBF; No. 2 Ranked Heavyweight; The Ring; No. 8 Ranked Heavyweight

Result
- Klitschko defeated Brewster via 6th round corner retirement

Wladimir Klitschko vs. Lamon Brewster II, was a professional boxing match contested on 7 July 2007 for the IBF Heavyweight Championship.

== Background ==
After stopping Chris Byrd to win the IBF world title Wladimir Klitschko had made two defences against Calvin Brock and Ray Austin both within the distance. Klitschko was hoping to face WBA champion Nikolai Valuev in a unification bout, however after he lost to Ruslan Chagaev, Klitschko opted to rematch Lamon Brewster.

Brewster had been out of ring for fifteen months since had surgery to repair a detached retina in his left eye as a result of his decision loss to Siarhei Liakhovich, where he lost the WBO belt that he had won against Klitschko three years earlier.

On 17 April 2007 it was confirmed that Klitschko would face Brewster in a rematch on 7 July in Cologne. Speaking at the announcement Klitschko said "This chance for revenge against Lamon Brewster is a dream come true. He is without a doubt an extremely dangerous opponent, but I always hoped for a chance to redeem myself." Brewster meanwhile confidently predicted a repeat saying "I will knock out Klitschko again and then no one will be able to say that the first win was a fluke." This was a mandatory defense for Klitschko, as Brewster was the highest available contender behind Klitschko's previous opponent Austin.

When Brewster travelled to Germany for the Klitschko rematch, he was on medical suspension in the United States.

== The fight ==
Klitschko dominated the fight with Brewster having no answer to his strong left jab. After being rocked in the sixth round Brewster's trainer Buddy McGirt threw in the towel before the start of the seventh.

According to CompuBox Klitschko landed 199 punches with 46% accuracy, against Brewster's 70 punches with 28% accuracy.

== Aftermath ==
After the fight it emerged that Klitschko had broken his left middle finger in the first round.

By the end of October 2007, Wladimir Klitschko started negotiations with WBO champion Sultan Ibragimov about a potential unification showdown.

Brewster would only fight four more times before he retired in January 2011.

== Undercard ==
Confirmed bouts:

== Broadcasting ==
The fight averaged 11.27 million viewers in Germany on RTL (57.0 share), peaking at 11.86 million. It was the ninth most-watched television broadcast of 2007 in Germany.

Country	Broadcaster
Germany	RTL
United States	HBO

Preceded by vs. Ray Austin	Wladimir Klitschko' bouts 7 July 2007	Succeeded by vs. Sultan Ibragimov
Preceded by vs. Siarhei Liakhovich	Lamon Brewster's bouts 7 July 2007	Succeeded by vs. Danny Batchelder
