= Wladimir Klitschko vs. Calvin Brock =

Boxing match

- Date: 11 November 2006
- Venue: Madison Square Garden, New York City, New York, U.S.
- Title(s) on the line: IBF and IBO heavyweight championship

Tale of the tape
Boxer	Wladimir Klitschko	Calvin Brock
Nickname	"Dr. Steelhammer"	"The Boxing Banker"
Hometown	Kyiv, Ukraine	Charlotte, North Carolina, U.S.
Pre-fight record	46–3 (41 KO)	29–0 (22 KO)
Age	30 years, 7 months	31 years, 9 months
Height	6 ft 6 in (198 cm)	6 ft 2 in (188 cm)
Weight	241 lb (109 kg)	224 1/2 lb (102 kg)
Style	Orthodox	Orthodox
Recognition	IBF/IBO; Heavyweight Champion; The Ring; No. 1 Ranked Heavyweight	IBF; No. 2 Ranked Heavyweight; The Ring; No. 7 Ranked Heavyweight

Result
- Klitschko defeated Brock by 7th round TKO

Wladimir Klitschko vs. Calvin Brock was a professional boxing match contested on 11 November 2006, for the IBF and IBO heavyweight championship.

== Background ==
After stopping Chris Byrd to win his first major world title Wladimir Klitschko had risen to the top of The Ring rankings as the best heavyweight in the world. By August it was reported that both No. 2 ranked Calvin Brock and 3-division champion James Toney had turned down offers to face him After efforts to fight WBC champion Oleg Maskaev and former Lineal champion Shannon Briggs, fell through, Brook accepted an improved offer in September to face Klitschko on 11 November. Speaking after the bout was signed Klitschko's adviser Shelly Finkel said "Brock is a better fight for the public, anyway. If Wladimir knocks Briggs right out, Briggs was a bum. If Briggs gives him a hard time, they'll say Klitschko's not that good. It was a very hard thing to do, either way. Brock is a fresh face and an undefeated top contender. It's a good fight. There is nothing negative about it." The manager for WBO heavyweight champion Sergei Liakhovich, Ivailo Gotzev expressed disappointment saying "I think HBO is making a bad decision with this fight. They are taking a step backwards. HBO and Shelly Finkel should be ashamed of running Briggs out of this fight. Calvin Brock does not deserve to be in this fight. He's going to be gone in 60 seconds. It wont even be a fight. He's a smart kid, a nice kid, but should not be in the title fight against Klitschko." Liakhovich would later sign to face Briggs on 4 November.

Speaking at the pre fight press conference Klitschko admitted that he didn't yet feel like a true champion saying "I don't consider myself a champion as in Muhammad Ali, Lennox Lewis, Rocky Marciano and Joe Louis, everybody is looking for a real Heavyweight Champion; not just one of four." Brook told the conference "I will go out and box accordingly to not get hit and to hit him, then if the knockout comes, it comes. If it don't, I will win a decision. The heavyweight division is stacked with a bunch of talent. It's not weak, definitely not weak. The division is pretty strong and that's why the title keeps changing hands." Klitschko was a 4 to 1 favourite to win although there were those predicting that Brock would take advantage of the champion perceived chin and stamina issues.

== The fight ==
In the opening rounds, Brock's economical but effective movement made Klitschko reluctant to throw punches, with Wladimir not being able to fully establish his rhythm. In between the 3rd and 4th rounds, Klitschko's trainer Emmanuel Steward urged the champion to press the action. From then on, Klitschko started fighting more aggressively, hurting Brock several times with the right cross. In the 5th, Brock opened a cut under Klitschko's left eye that started bleeding heavily in the sixth. With just over a minute left in the 7th round, Brock was caught with a counter right hand, left hook, before being sent to the canvas face first, with another straight right. Brock rose to his feet but was clearly on unsteady legs, prompting referee Wayne Kelly to stop the bout.

At the time of the stoppage Klitschko led 59–55 on two of the scorecards and 59–56 on the other. HBO's unofficial ringside scorer Harold Lederman had it 59–56 for Klitschko.

== Aftermath ==
When asked about the combination that ended the bout Klitschko said "I should have done that earlier in the fight. It took me a little time to get the distance I needed and to get my rhythm. He was a good defensive fighter. Anytime you defeat an undefeated fighter, you've accomplished something. When I landed the combination, I thought he was done." He also reiterated that he wanted to unify the division stating "Only the guy who will unify the titles will be respected. My goal is to get unification, and my goal is to get my next fight as a unification fight. It doesn't matter with whom, Valuev, Shannon Briggs or Maskaev. I'm not interested in staying in the sport to just keep fighting. I am interested in unifying the titles. I think the heavyweight division needs a real champion." Brook meanwhile said "I saw the punch coming but I couldn't react fast enough to get out of the way. I wasn't surprised by how hard he punched. He had a better jab than I thought he would. He's very strong. He's got a good defence and good jab. I thought I could get behind my jab better and my right hand. I wasn't able to. He's got good movement and he's very good. I'll be back. I will still be champion."

The post fight news conference was gate-crashed by newly crowned WBO titeholder Shannon Briggs to try to goad Klitschko into a unification fight, with Briggs saying "I respect you, brother, but let's unify these titles".

== Undercard ==
Confirmed bouts:

== Broadcasting ==
Country	Broadcaster
Germany	RTL
Russia	Russia-2
United States	HBO

Preceded by vs. Chris Byrd II	Wladimir Klitschko's bouts 11 November 2006	Succeeded by vs. Ray Austin
Preceded by vs. Timur Ibragimov	Calvin Brock's bouts 11 November 2006	Succeeded by vs. Ralph West
