= Jeremy Bates (boxer) =

American boxer

Personal information
- Nickname: The Beast
- Nationality: American
- Born: Jeremy Bates; January 12, 1974 (age 52) Argillite, Kentucky
- Height: 5 ft 10.5 in (1.791 m)
- Weight: Heavyweight

Boxing career
- Reach: 72 in (183 cm)
- Stance: Orthodox

Boxing record
- Total fights: 41
- Wins: 23
- Win by KO: 19
- Losses: 17
- Draws: 1
- No contests: 0

Jeremy Bates (born January 12, 1974) is an American professional boxer. Nicknamed "The Beast", Bates was a moderately successful fighter who fought several other journeyman fighters of his era. Bates has become something of a "comeback" opponent for veteran fighters such as Holyfield, Golota, and Meehan.

== Professional boxing career ==
=== Early career ===
Bates turned professional in 1999 and fought mainly journeyman fighters, losing to prospect Andre Purlette in 2001. Bates later lost to Sedreck Fields, Kirk Johnson, Leo Nolan, Brian Minto, and Ray Austin before his first retirement.

=== The Evander Holyfield fight ===
Bates was persuaded to postpone his retirement when he was given an opportunity to fight four-time heavyweight champion Evander Holyfield. On August 18, 2006, in a 10-round bout at the American Airlines Center in Dallas, Texas, 44-year-old Holyfield dominated the fight which was stopped in the second round after he landed around 20 consecutive punches on Bates. The events prior to, and the fight itself, are documented in Evander Holyfield's book 'Becoming Holyfield'.

=== Retirement from boxing ===
Bates retired with a record of 21 wins, 13 losses and 1 draw, with 18 wins by knockout. Post boxing, Bates began a career as a full-time insurance sales professional. Bates is currently employed at the United States Enrichment Corporation. (USEC) is a Uranium gaseous diffusion plant in Portsmouth OH.

=== Coming out of retirement ===
Bates would come out of retirement to face Guillermo Jones, Andrew Golota, Odlanier Solis, Kevin Rainey, and most recently Kali Meehan. All of those fights, with the exception of Bates' bout with Kevin Rainey, would be losses. Currently, Bates' record stands at 23 wins, 17 losses and 1 draw, with 19 wins by knockout.

== Professional boxing record ==
46 fights	26 wins	19 losses
By knockout	22	14
By decision	4	4
By disqualification	0	1
Draws	1	

No.	Result	Record	Opponent	Type	Round, time	Date	Location	Notes
46	Loss	26–19–1	(United States) BJ Flores	TKO	1 (10)	Feb 25, 2017	(United States) Celebrity Theatre, Phoenix	
45	Loss	26–18–1	(Colombia) Óscar Rivas	KO	1 (8)	Jun 4, 2016	(Canada) Bell Centre, Montreal	
44	Win	26–17–1	(United States) Adolpho Washington	RTD	1 (6)	Apr 23, 2016	(United States) Pullman Plaza Hotel, Huntington	
43	Win	25–17–1	(United States) Dante Craig	TKO	2 (6)	Sep 5, 2015	(United States) Big Sandy Superstore Arena, Huntington	
42	Win	24–17–1	(United States) Levi Bowling	TKO	1 (4)	Jul 11, 2015	(United States) Parkersburg	
41	Win	23–17–1	(United States) Justin Riegle	TKO	1 (4), 1:03	Jul 30, 2011	(United States) Cannonsburg, Kentucky	
40	Loss	22–17–1	(Belarus) Siarhei Liakhovich	TKO	1 (8), 2:11	Nov 7, 2009	Nuremberg, Germany	
39	Loss	22–16–1	(Australia) Kali Meehan	TKO	3 (10), 1:16	Feb 16, 2008	Nuremberg, Germany	
38	Win	22–15–1	(United States) Kevin Rainey	UD	4	Jan 18, 2008	(United States) Somerset, Kentucky	
37	Loss	21–15–1	(Cuba) Odlanier Solís	TKO	2 (8), 0:18	Oct 19, 2007	Berlin, Germany	
36	Loss	21–14–1	(Poland) Andrew Golota	TKO	2 (10), 2:59	Jun 9, 2007	Katowice, Poland	
35	Loss	21–13–1	(Panama) Guillermo Jones	TKO	1 (8), 1:44	Jan 6, 2007	(United States) Hollywood, Florida	
34	Loss	21–12–1	(United States) Evander Holyfield	TKO	2 (10), 2:56	Aug 18, 2006	(United States) Dallas, Texas	
33	Loss	21–11–1	(United States) Ray Austin	TKO	2 (10), 1:17	Apr 1, 2006	(United States) Cleveland, Ohio	
32	Loss	21–10–1	(United States) Zack Page	UD	8	Dec 9, 2005	(United States) Wheeling, West Virginia	
31	Win	21–9–1	(United States) Jason Waller	UD	8	Oct 14, 2005	(United States) Wheeling, West Virginia	
30	Win	20–9–1	(United States) Travis Fulton	TKO	1 (8)	Aug 12, 2005	(United States) Wheeling, West Virginia	
29	Loss	19–9–1	(United States) Jason Waller	UD	6	May 24, 2005	(United States) Woodlawn, Maryland	
28	Win	19–8–1	(United States) Carlton Johnson	UD	8	Apr 22, 2005	(United States) Wheeling, West Virginia	
27	Win	18-8–1	(United States) Kevin Tallon	UD	4	Jun 25, 2004	(United States) Wheeling, West Virginia	
26	Loss	17–8–1	(United States) Brian Minto	TKO	8 (10), 2:56	Apr 23, 2004	(United States) Wheeling, West Virginia	For vacant West Virginia heavyweight title.
25	Win	17–7–1	(United States) Jeff Lally	KO	2	Jan 18, 2004	(United States) West Virginia	
24	Loss	16–7–1	(United States) Leo Nolan	TKO	4 (8)	Jun 13, 2003	(United States) Detroit, Michigan	Corner retirement.
23	Win	16–6–1	(United States) Rodney Phillips	TKO	1	Mar 29, 2003	(United States) Parkersburg, West Virginia	
22	Loss	15–6–1	(Canada) Kirk Johnson	KO	2 (8), 2:59	Dec 7, 2002	(United States) Las Vegas, Nevada	
21	Win	15–5–1	(United States) Mark Johnson	TKO	4 (4), 0:00	Jul 12, 2002	(United States) Lexington, Kentucky	Corner retirement.
20	Loss	14–5–1	(United States) Willie Phillips	TKO	6 (8), 1:41	Jun 11, 2002	(United States) Chester, West Virginia	
19	Win	14–4–1	(United States) Scott Hosaflook	TKO	1	Jun 1, 2002	(United States) Morgantown, West Virginia	
18	Loss	13–4–1	(United States) David McNemar	MD	12	Apr 20, 2002	(United States) Parkersburg, West Virginia	
17	Loss	13–3–1	(United States) Sedreck Fields	DQ	4 (5), 1:11	Jan 30, 2002	(United States) Miami Beach, Florida	Bates was disqualified for flagrant headbutting.
16	Loss	13–2–1	(Guyana) Andre Purlette	TKO	2 (12), 1:29	Oct 5, 2001	(United States) Miami Beach, Florida	For vacant NABO heavyweight title.
15	Win	13–1–1	(United States) Jimmy Haynes	KO	1 (6), 2:00	Sep 28, 2001	(United States) Lexington, Kentucky	
14	Win	12–1–1	(United States) Gerald Moore	KO	1	Aug 25, 2001	(United States) Beckley, West Virginia	
13	Win	11–1–1	(United States) Carlton Johnson	KO	1	Aug 14, 2001	(United States) Chester, West Virginia	
12	Win	10–1–1	(United States) Jorel Mann	TKO	1	Jul 28, 2001	(United States) Huntington, West Virginia	
11	Win	9–1–1	(United States) Mike Sheppard	TKO	1	Jun 9, 2001	(United States) Parkersburg, West Virginia	
10	Win	8–1–1	(United States) Antonio Colbert	TKO	1 (4), 2:10	Apr 19, 2001	(United States) Lexington, Kentucky	
9	Win	7–1–1	(United States) David Johnson	KO	1 (4), 1:50	Mar 30, 2001	(United States) Lexington, Kentucky	
8	Draw	6–1–1	(United States) Chad Van Sickle	PTS	4	Mar 1, 2001	(United States) Lexington, Kentucky	
7	Win	6–1	(United States) Elmer Coles	TKO	1	Jan 20, 2001	(United States) Huntington, West Virginia	
6	Win	5–1	(United States) George Randolph	TKO	1	Dec 9, 2000	(United States) Huntington, West Virginia	
5	Win	4–1	(United States) Thomas Dixon	TKO	3	Sep 16, 2000	(United States) Huntington, West Virginia	
4	Win	3–1	(United States) Mario Hereford	KO	2	Aug 26, 2000	(United States) Gallatin, Tennessee	
3	Win	2–1	(United States) Kanovas Alexander	TKO	1	Jun 8, 2000	(United States) Barboursville, West Virginia	
2	Loss	1–1	(United States) Tim Knight	UD	4	Mar 22, 2000	(United States) Louisville, Kentucky	
1	Win	1–0	(United States) Reggie Strickland	TKO	1 (4)	Nov 10, 1999	(United States) Chester, West Virginia	

== Professional wrestling ==
Bates made his professional wrestling debut on November 15, 2008, in Ashland, Kentucky, at Ohio Championship Wrestling's November Reign, where he defeated Vinnie Viagra. He defeated "The Driller" Eddie Browning on December 13 at OCW's Season's Beatings.

Bates got his third victory at OCW on January 10, 2009, at the New Year's Bash by defeating NWA All-Star Wrestling Heavyweight Champion "Pretty Boy" Stan Lee. Bates made his wrestling debut at an arena where he is undefeated in the boxing ranks, the Veterans Memorial Fieldhouse in Huntington, West Virginia, at 304 Wrestling's Battlefront. He defeated Vinnie Viagra in that outing.

Bates is now in training to fight in the Ultimate Fighting Championship. His progress is being documented in a YouTube series called "Being the Beast".
