= Wladimir Klitschko vs. Ray Austin =

Boxing match

Danger Zone
- Date: 10 March 2007
- Venue: SAP Arena, Mannheim, Baden-Württemberg, Germany
- Title(s) on the line: IBF/IBO heavyweight championship

Tale of the tape
Boxer	Wladimir Klitschko	Ray Austin
Nickname	"Dr. Steelhammer"	"The Rainman"
Hometown	Kyiv, Ukraine	Cleveland, Ohio, U.S.
Pre-fight record	47–3 (42 KO)	24–3–4 (16 KO)
Age	30 years, 11 months	36 years, 4 months
Height	6 ft 6 in (198 cm)	6 ft 6 in (198 cm)
Weight	246 1/2 lb (112 kg)	247 lb (112 kg)
Style	Orthodox	Orthodox
Recognition	IBF/IBO; Heavyweight Champion; The Ring; No. 1 Ranked Heavyweight	IBF; No. 1 Ranked Heavyweight

Result
- Klitschko defeats Austin by 2nd round KO.

Wladimir Klitschko vs. Ray Austin was a professional boxing match contested on 10 March 2007, for the IBF and IBO heavyweight championship.

== Background ==
Following his November 2006 stoppage victory over unbeaten Calvin Brock, Wladimir Klitschko made it clear that he wanted a unification bout next saying that "I am interested in unifying the division. The heavyweight division needs a real champion. I don't consider myself the real champion now. My goal is to get the unification and my goal is that my next fight is a unification fight." He was linked with WBC champion Oleg Maskaev, with an April 28 bout at Madison Square Garden moted. Klitschko's adviser Shelly Finkel told ESPN "Preferably Maskaev, that would be our first choice, however Wladimir is a realist. So even though he wants a unification fight next, he may have to do the mandatory first and get that out of the way. We would do it and go from there." Ray Austin had become his mandatory following a draw with Sultan Ibragimov, where Austin's team successfully argued to the IBF that the referee had missed a 7th round knockdown which would have changed the result. Speaking in the aftermath of the Klitschko Brock bout Austin said in a press release"Klitschko has a soft heart and a weak chin and I'm going to knock him out. I'm not one of these inexperienced, undersized heavyweight contenders. I'm not Calvin Brock, I'm not a 213-pound Chris Byrd, either. I'm a full-grown heavyweight. The last time Klitschko faced a man his weight was against Samuel Peter, who knocked him down three times while giving away five inches in height. Same thing when Lamon Brewster knocked him out. I guarantee some rain is going to fall on Klitschko when we fight."

On January 22 it was confirmed that Klitschko would face Austin on 10 March. Three days later Vitali Klitschko announced that he planned to end his retirement and challenge Maskaev for the WBC title.

At the press conference to announce the fight, Austin's promoter Don King said that Austin "will end Klitschko’s career". In preparation for the fight, Austin was trained by Stacey McKinley, a former assistant trainer to Mike Tyson, who told the press in the build up "You’re going to see a much improved fighter, I don’t see any reason he [Austin] can’t win. Once you get past the punching power of Klitschko, there is nothing there." For his part Klitschko's trainer, Emanuel Steward, told the press "Ray Austin is running into the growth and progression of Wlad, those watching the fight are going to be lucky enough to see the emergence of one of the greatest heavyweights ever."

== The fight ==
Halfway through the 2nd round, Klitschko landed 4 consecutive left hooks to Austin's head, which sent the challenger face first onto the canvas. He rose to his feet but failed to beat the count and Klitschko had 2nd round KO without having to throw a single right hand.

== Aftermath ==
Speaking after the bout Klitschko said "I was surprised he got back up, but he wasn't clear in the head. I was motivated by the talk from Austin and his promoter, Don King, before the fight." Neither Austin nor King, both of whom had called Klitschko heartless before the bout, appeared at the postfight press conference. Klitschko also expressed an interest in a unification bout with WBA champion Nikolai Valuev saying "I want to fight Nikolai, and I believe Nikolai wants to fight me, so I hope we can get it done. I have always tried to get this fight but it's not that easy, especially with two promoters [Don King and Wilfried Sauerland] involved. But maybe the public pressure can help make this fight happen."

== Undercard ==
Confirmed bouts:

== Broadcasting ==
In Germany, the fight averaged 12.88 million viewers, with 52.8 market share. At its peak, the fight was watched by 13.27 million people. It ended up becoming the seventh most-watched television broadcast of 2007.

Country	Broadcaster
Germany	RTL
United States	HBO

Preceded by vs. Calvin Brock	Wladimir Klitschko's bouts 10 March 2007	Succeeded by vs. Lamon Brewster II
Preceded by vs. Sultan Ibragimov	Ray Austin's bouts 10 March 2007	Succeeded by vs. Domonic Jenkins
