= Ray Austin (boxer) =

American boxer

Personal information
- Nickname: The Rainman
- Born: October 31, 1970 (age 55) Cleveland, Ohio, U.S.
- Height: 6 ft 6 in (198 cm)
- Weight: Heavyweight

Boxing career
- Reach: 80 in (203 cm)
- Stance: Orthodox

Boxing record
- Total fights: 44
- Wins: 29
- Win by KO: 18
- Losses: 10
- Draws: 5

Ray Austin (born October 31, 1970) is an American former professional boxer who competed between 1998 and 2021. He challenged for the IBF and IBO heavyweight titles in 2007.

== Professional career ==
Austin has drawn with other notable heavyweights Lance Whitaker, Larry Donald, and Sultan Ibragimov. Austin is also known for his TKO victory over Jo el Scott, the final professional bout for Scott.

In 2007, Austin was promoted to the International Boxing Federation's mandatory challenger due to his draw with Sultan Ibragimov. He challenged Wladimir Klitschko on March 10, 2007, and lost at 1:23 in the second round by technical knockout.

Austin also competed in Cedric Kushner's Thunderbox Heavyweight Tournament, "Fistful of Dollars", but lost.

Austin most recently defeated Domonic Jenkins, Andrew Golota and Julius Long.

In his most recent fight in a WBC Title Eliminator on October 31, 2009, against DaVarryl Williamson who he defeated by fourth round technical knockout after knocking him down as Williamson got up the referee stops the fight.

== Professional boxing record ==
44 fights	29 wins	10 losses
By knockout	18	6
By decision	11	3
By disqualification	0	1
Draws	5	

No.	Result	Record	Opponent	Type	Round, time	Date	Location	Notes
44	Draw	29–10–5	Rydell Booker	SD	6	11 Nov 2021	Motor City Casino, Detroit, Michigan, U.S.	
43	Loss	29–10–4	Ivan Dychko	TKO	3 (6), 1:48	10 May 2019	Seminole Hard Rock Hotel & Casino, Hollywood, Florida, U.S.	
42	Loss	29–9–4	Robert Alfonso	UD	6	15 Feb 2019	Tuscaloosa Rivermarket, Tuscaloosa, Alabama, U.S.	
41	Loss	29–8–4	Gerald Washington	KO	4 (10), 1:45	16 Jul 2016	Legacy Arena, Birmingham, Alabama, U.S.	
40	Loss	29–7–4	Andy Ruiz Jr.	RTD	4 (8), 3:00	14 May 2016	Sportsman Lodge, Studio City, California, U.S.	For NABF heavyweight title
39	Win	29–6–4	Earl Ladson	UD	6	21 Feb 2014	Wolstein Center, Cleveland, Ohio, U.S.	
38	Loss	28–6–4	Bermane Stiverne	TKO	10 (12), 0:43	25 Jun 2011	Family Arena, St. Charles, Missouri, U.S.	For vacant WBC Silver heavyweight title
37	Loss	28–5–4	Odlanier Solís	DQ	10 (12), 2:59	17 Dec 2010	American Airlines Arena, Miami, Florida, U.S.	Austin disqualified for hitting after the bell
36	Win	28–4–4	DaVarryl Williamson	TKO	4 (12), 2:37	31 Oct 2009	Treasure Island Hotel and Casino, Paradise, Nevada, U.S.	
35	Win	27–4–4	Julius Long	UD	8	14 Feb 2009	BankAtlantic Center, Sunrise, Florida, U.S.	
34	Win	26–4–4	Andrew Golota	RTD	1 (12), 3:00	7 Nov 2008	Sichuan Gymnasium, Chengdu, China	Won vacant WBC–USNBC heavyweight title
33	Win	25–4–4	Domonic Jenkins	UD	8	27 Sep 2008	Home Depot Center, Carson, California, U.S.	
32	Loss	24–4–4	Wladimir Klitschko	KO	2 (12), 1:23	10 Mar 2007	SAP Arena, Mannheim, Germany	For IBF and IBO heavyweight titles
31	Draw	24–3–4	Sultan Ibragimov	SD	12	28 Jul 2006	Seminole Hard Rock Hotel & Casino, Hollywood, Florida, U.S.	
30	Win	24–3–3	Jeremy Bates	TKO	2 (10), 1:17	1 Apr 2006	Wolstein Center, Cleveland, Ohio, U.S.	
29	Win	23–3–3	Owen Beck	SD	12	3 Sep 2005	Gund Arena, Cleveland, Ohio, U.S.	Won vacant WBC–USNBC heavyweight title
28	Draw	22–3–3	Larry Donald	MD	12	30 Apr 2005	Madison Square Garden, New York City, New York, U.S.	For vacant WBC–USNBC heavyweight title
27	Win	22–3–2	Ken Murphy	UD	6	25 Jun 2004	Knights of Columbus Hall, Cleveland, Ohio, U.S.	
26	Win	21–3–2	Gilbert Martinez	TKO	4 (6), 2:48	17 May 2004	Bally's Las Vegas, Paradise, Nevada, U.S.	
25	Win	20–3–2	Willie Williams	TD	5 (6), 0:23	6 Mar 2004	Foxwoods Resort Casino, Ledyard, Connecticut, U.S.	Unanimous TD after Austin cut from accidental foul
24	Win	19–3–2	Jo el Scott	TKO	8 (10), 3:00	26 Aug 2003	Sandia Casino, Albuquerque, New Mexico, U.S.	
23	Win	18–3–2	Sedreck Fields	SD	8	9 May 2003	Bally's Park Place Hotel and Casino, Atlantic City, New Jersey, U.S.	
22	Draw	17–3–2	Zuri Lawrence	MD	10	15 Feb 2003	Flamingo Hilton, Paradise, Nevada, U.S.	
21	Win	17–3–1	Francis Royal	TKO	3 (6), 0:29	29 Sep 2002	Palace Indian Gaming Center, Lemoore, California, U.S.	
20	Draw	16–3–1	Lance Whitaker	SD	10	13 Apr 2002	Mountaineer Casino Racetrack and Resort, Chester, West Virginia, U.S.	
19	Win	16–3	Gary Winmon	UD	5	30 Jan 2002	Level Nightclub, Miami Beach, Florida, U.S.	
18	Loss	15–3	Attila Levin	TKO	9 (10), 0:30	20 Jul 2001	Caesars Palace, Paradise, Nevada, U.S.	
17	Win	15–2	Fai Falamoe	TKO	4 (6), 1:38	28 Apr 2001	Civic Center, La Porte, Indiana, U.S.	
16	Loss	14–2	Harold Sconiers	UD	6	2 Nov 2000	Bethlehem, Pennsylvania, U.S.	
15	Win	14–1	Ramon Hayes	TKO	1 (6), 2:08	14 Sep 2000	Hammerstein Ballroom, New York City, New York, U.S.	
14	Win	13–1	Tim Noble	TKO	2 (6)	27 Apr 2000	Hammerstein Ballroom, New York City, New York, U.S.	
13	Win	12–1	Ron McCarthy	PTS	6	24 Feb 2000	Hammerstein Ballroom, New York City, New York, U.S.	
12	Win	11–1	Ronnie Smith	TKO	4 (4), 1:38	13 Jan 2000	Casino Magic, Bay St. Louis, Mississippi, U.S.	
11	Win	10–1	Ron Guerrero	TKO	6 (6), 0:26	12 Dec 1999	Memorial Coliseum, Corpus Christi, Texas, U.S.	
10	Win	9–1	Cisse Salif	KO	4 (6)	7 Oct 1999	Soaring Eagle Casino, Mount Pleasant, Michigan, U.S.	
9	Win	8–1	Zibielee Kimbrough	TKO	1, 2:25	10 Sep 1999	Soaring Eagle Casino, Mount Pleasant, Michigan, U.S.	
8	Win	7–1	Grant Cudjoe	UD	4	13 Aug 1999	Foxwoods Resort Casino, Ledyard, Connecticut, U.S.	
7	Win	6–1	Charles Young	KO	1 (6)	3 Jun 1999	Soaring Eagle Casino, Mount Pleasant, Michigan, U.S.	
6	Win	5–1	Mike Bradley	TKO	1 (4), 1:37	3 Apr 1999	UAW Hall, Lima, Ohio, U.S.	
5	Win	4–1	Kevin Wilson	TKO	1, 2:39	19 Mar 1999	Grays Armory, Cleveland, Ohio, U.S.	
4	Win	3–1	Zibielee Kimbrough	TKO	1 (6)	4 Mar 1999	Soaring Eagle Casino, Mount Pleasant, Michigan, U.S.	
3	Loss	2–1	Lincoln Luke	TKO	2	22 Jan 1999	Grays Armory, Cleveland, Ohio, U.S.	
2	Win	2–0	Wesley Smith	PTS	4	9 Sep 1998	Louisville, Kentucky, U.S.	
1	Win	1–0	Charles Hatcher	PTS	4	10 Jul 1998	Columbus, Ohio, U.S.	

Sporting positions
Regional boxing titles
New title	WBC–USNBC heavyweight champion 3 Sep 2005 – Jul 2007; Vacated	Vacant Title next held by Duncan Dokiwari
Vacant Title last held by Joe Mesi	WBC–USNBC heavyweight champion 7 Nov 2008 – Jun 2009; Vacated	Vacant Title next held by Derric Rossy
