= Tom Greenwade =

American baseball scout (1904-1986)

- Born: August 21, 1904; Willard, Missouri, U.S.
- Died: August 10, 1986 (aged 81); Ash Grove, Missouri, U.S.
- Occupation: Baseball scout
- Years active: 1941–1964
- Known for: Scouting Mickey Mantle and Jackie Robinson

Thomas E. Greenwade (August 21, 1904 – August 10, 1986) was an American baseball scout. After a brief minor league career as a pitcher and manager, Greenwade scouted for the St. Louis Browns, Brooklyn Dodgers and New York Yankees of Major League Baseball (MLB) between 1941 and 1964. He is best known for discovering players such as Mickey Mantle and Elston Howard, and for his role in Jackie Robinson's ascent to break baseball's color barrier.

== Early life ==
Greenwade was born in Willard, Missouri. He was one-quarter Cherokee. His father ran a lumber mill in Willard. Greenwade's mother died when he was ten years old. The family was poor, instilling a frugality in Greenwade that influenced the rest of his life. Greenwade had a strong arm as a child. He could kill rabbits by throwing rocks at them; locals subsequently purchased the rabbits from him for a quarter apiece.

== Early scouting career ==
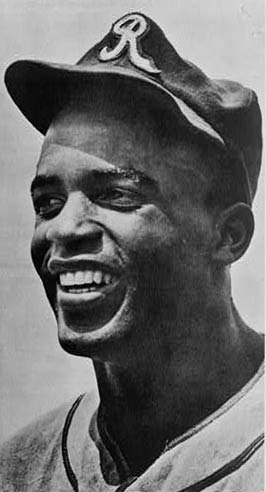
Jackie Robinson during his Negro league days

As a young man, Greenwade was a pitcher and manager in minor league baseball. While pitching in the minor leagues, he contracted typhoid fever and he nearly died. While he recovered, he was away from baseball for a couple of seasons, working for the Internal Revenue Service at one point. By 1940, he had returned to the minor leagues as a manager. In 1941, he joined the St. Louis Browns as a scout.

Later, Greenwade scouted for the Brooklyn Dodgers. In the mid-1940s, as the Dodgers looked to break baseball's color line, Greenwade was sent to Mexico City to scout a black Cuban player named Silvio García. When Greenwade went to meet with Mexican League president Jorge Pasquel about the possibility of recruiting García to the United States, the Mexican League official and his brother began the talks by brandishing firearms. In any case, Greenwade found that García had difficulty pulling pitches toward the left side of the field, so he did not recommend that the team pursue García any further.

Greenwade was later assigned to follow Jackie Robinson and observe his play. After 50 days, he reported back to Rickey that Robinson had the skills and temperament to integrate baseball. The scout was sympathetic to racial issues because black family friends had been very helpful to Greenwade in the wake of his mother's death.

== New York Yankees ==
Greenwade scouted for the Yankees between 1949 and 1964, discovering players such as Elston Howard and Bobby Murcer. He is best known for scouting Mickey Mantle, however. Though baseball mythology has sometimes held that Greenwade signed Mantle during an impromptu stop at a baseball game that he saw from the roadway, Greenwade actually followed Mantle's play for two years. Regulations at the time dictated that Mantle had to graduate from high school before discussing professional baseball contracts. Scared to lose Mantle to another scout, Greenwade noted the date of Mantle's planned high school graduation and signed him the night of the high school commencement. Mantle said that the Class D contract was worth $1,500, while Greenwade said that Mantle received $1,150.

According to Greenwade, the eyesight that he inherited from his Native American ancestors helped him to spot good talent as a baseball scout. He stood out from other scouts because he avoided taking notes on players, believing that most scouts missed out on key observations because they were writing notes and had their heads down. Even well into his career, Greenwade had what David Halberstam described as "an almost pathological fear of being poor again." He saved money in any way that he could, and his only major expense was the purchase of Cadillacs; he bought one every two years because of the miles that he logged while pursuing baseball talent.

== Later life ==
After his time as a Yankees scout, Greenwade retired to Willard. He continued to visit the Yankees clubhouse when they played in Kansas City, and he remained popular among Yankees players. He died of heart failure in 1986 at a nursing home in Ash Grove, Missouri. He had saved enough money to own a bank, a water company and a farm, which he turned over to one of his sons.
