= Willard R-2 School District =

School district in Missouri, U.S.

Willard R-2, Missouri School District
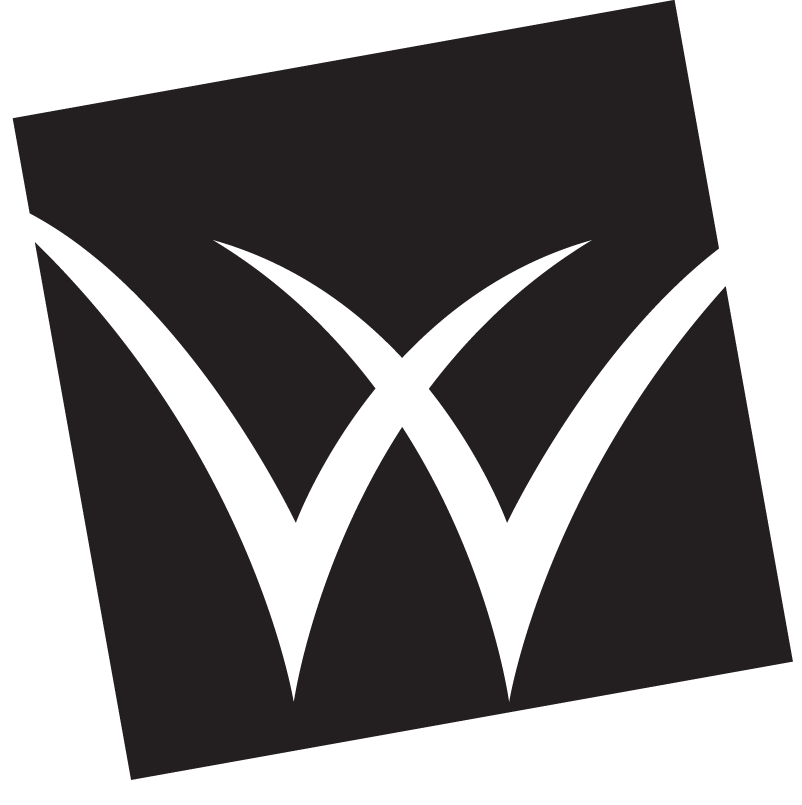

Location
- Willard, Missouri

District information
- Type: Public School District
- Grades: PreK - 12
- Established: 1921
- Superintendent: Dr. Eric Wilken
- Schools: 9
- Budget: $54 million (2020-2021)

Students and staff
- Students: 4,732
- Teachers: 350
- Staff: 170
- Athletic conference: Central Ozark Conference

Other information
- Website: www.willardschools.net

Willard Public Schools, also known as the Willard R-2 School District, is a public school district headquartered in Willard, Missouri, United States. With an official 2022-2023 enrollment of 4,732 students attending 5 elementary schools, two intermediate schools, one middle school, and one high school.

The district includes Willard and portions of Springfield.

== List of schools ==
=== High schools ===
Willard High School has an enrollment of 1,381 students grades 9-12. According to the U.S. News & World Report, Willard High School is ranked as the 54th best high school out of 618 in the state of Missouri. Willard High School is housed in a building that was originally constructed in 2006.

=== Middle School ===
Willard Middle School supports students in grades 7-8. It has an enrollment of 741 as of 2022. The school is housed in a building that was originally the high school.

=== Intermediate schools ===
- Willard Intermediate School North is attached to Willard North Elementary. It is housed in a building that was originally the middle school.
- Willard Intermediate School South is the newest building in the district with construction finishing in 2019.

=== Elementary schools ===
- Willard Central Elementary School
- Willard East Elementary School
- Willard North Elementary School
- Willard Orchard Hills Elementary
- Willard South Elementary School

== Recognition ==
Willard Public Schools is known for its fine arts programs. From 2016 - 2024 they were named one of the best communities for music education by the National Association of Music Merchants Foundation. Willard theater has won 13 state championships in one-act plays or readers theater since 1997.

Athletically, Willard Public Schools have won two baseball state championships, two volleyball state championships, as well as numerous individual championships.

In 2018 Willard Central Elementary School was designated as a National Blue Ribbon School.
