= Leo Nolan =

United States heavyweight boxer (born 1972)

Leo Nolan (born August 18, 1972) is an American former professional boxer.

== Biography ==
Nolan was born and raised in Detroit. As a junior he boxed for Kronk Gym for three years. He turned professional in 1992, winning his first five pro fights before his career was interrupted in 1996 after he was convicted of being an accomplice in a robbery of an off-duty police officer and sentenced to five years in prison. He was also shot five times in the incident. He was released in 2000, and after being out of boxing for almost eight years, returned to the ring in 2001. By 2007, Nolan had won all of his 26 professional fights. Past opponents include Lou Savarese, Jeremy Bates, and Andy Sample, and he has won the IBU intercontinental Heavyweight title and the IBA Americas Heavyweight Title. He suffered his first defeat to unheralded heavyweight Hector Ferreyro in 2007.

His career was interrupted again in June 2009 when he was shot in the neck during an attempted car-jacking.

He was stopped for the first time in his professional career in December 2009 by Alexander Povetkin, his second defeat from 29 professional fights.

== Professional boxing record ==
27 Wins (10 knockouts, 17 decisions), 2 Losses (1 knockout, 1 decision)
Result	Record	Opponent	Type	Round	Date	Location	Notes
Loss	27-2	(Russia) Alexander Povetkin	KO	3	05/12/2009	Arena Ludwigsburg, Ludwigsburg, Germany	Nolan knocked out at 2:33 of the third round.
Win	27-1	(United States) Mike "The Hammer" Jones	UD	8	10/10/2008	(United States) DeCarlo's Convention Center, Warren, Michigan	
Loss	26-1	(United States) Hector Ferreyro	MD	12	26/01/2007	(United States) Destiny's, Orlando, Florida	IBO USBO Heavyweight Title.
Win	26-0	(United States) Jed Phipps	DQ	8	26/08/2006	(United States) Club Cinema, Pompano Beach, Florida	IBO USBO Heavyweight Title. Phipps disqualified at 2:07 of the eighth round for repeatedly spitting out his mouthpiece.
Win	25-0	(United States) Wallace McDaniel	UD	8	29/06/2006	(United States) The Plex, North Charleston, South Carolina	
Win	24-0	(Romania) Marcel Beresoaie	TKO	3	23/04/2005	Westfalenhallen, Dortmund, Germany	
Win	23-0	(United States) Andy Sample	KO	3	01/04/2005	(United States) DeCarlo's Convention Center, Warren, Michigan	IBU Intercontinental Heavyweight Title. Sample knocked out at 2:13 of the third round.
Win	22-0	(United States) Lou Savarese	UD	12	07/05/2004	(United States) Foxwoods, Mashantucket, Connecticut	IBA Americas Heavyweight Title.
Win	21-0	(United States) Ken Murphy	UD	8	02/04/2004	(United States) DeCarlo's Banquet Center, Warren, Michigan	
Win	20-0	(United States) Jeremy Bates	TKO	4	13/06/2003	(United States) Joe Louis Arena, Detroit, Michigan	
Win	19-0	(United States) John Basil Jackson	TKO	3	17/05/2003	(United States) Hammond Civic Center, Hammond, Indiana	Referee stopped the bout at 0:58 of the third round.
Win	18-0	(United States) Don Normand	TKO	6	14/03/2003	(United States) DeCarlo's Banquet Center, Warren, Michigan	Referee stopped the bout at 2:48 of the sixth round.
Win	17-0	(United States) Chavez Francisco	UD	8	10/01/2003	(United States) DeCarlo's Banquet Center, Warren, Michigan	
Win	16-0	(United States) Bryan Blakely	UD	4	30/11/2002	(United States) Civic Center, LaPorte, Indiana	
Win	15-0	(United States) Frank Wood	TKO	5	20/09/2002	(United States) DeCarlo's Banquet Center, Warren, Michigan	Mid West/Mid American Heavyweight Titles.
Win	14-0	(United States) Mario Cawley	UD	10	21/06/2002	(United States) DeCarlo's Banquet Center, Warren, Michigan	Mid West/Mid American Heavyweight Titles.
Win	13-0	(United States) Curt Render	TKO	1	27/04/2002	(United States) Jarrell's Gym, Savannah, Georgia	
Win	12-0	(United States) Terry Porter	UD	6	29/03/2002	(United States) Club International, Detroit, Michigan	
Win	11-0	(United States) David J. Cherry	KO	4	31/01/2002	(United States) The Roostertail, Detroit, Michigan	Cherry knocked out at 0:45 of the fourth round.
Win	10-0	(United States) Willie Driver	UD	6	07/12/2001	(United States) Club International, Detroit, Michigan	
Win	9-0	(United States) Julius Long	UD	6	09/11/2001	(United States) Club International, Detroit, Michigan	
Win	8-0	(United States) Mike Brown	UD	4	12/10/2001	(United States) Club International, Detroit, Michigan	
Win	7-0	(United States) Mark Johnson	UD	4	10/08/2001	(United States) Cobo Hall, Detroit, Michigan	
Win	6-0	(United States) Val W. Smith	UD	6	10/04/2001	(United States) Andiamo's Banquet Center, Warren, Michigan	
Win	5-0	(United States) Exum Speight	PTS	4	25/05/1993	(United States) The Palace of Auburn Hills, Auburn Hills, Michigan	
Win	4-0	(United States) Ron Carter	SD	4	10/04/1993	(United States) Toledo, Ohio	
Win	3-0	(United States) Rick Willis	PTS	4	27/10/1992	(United States) The Palace of Auburn Hills, Auburn Hills, Michigan	
Win	2-0	(United States) Joe Senegal	KO	2	05/09/1992	(United States) Saginaw, Michigan	
Win	1-0	(United States) "Killer" Keith Williams	TKO	3	25/08/1992	(United States) The Palace of Auburn Hills, Auburn Hills, Michigan	
