= Jo el Scott =

American boxer

Medal record

Representing United States

Men's Boxing

World Amateur Championships
Bronze medal – third place	Tampere 1993	Super Heavyweight

Jo-el Scott (born March 25, 1971, in Albany, NY) is a former professional boxer, who is now serving a life prison sentence for rape and murder.

== Professional career ==
Scott was seen as having the potential to be the next great heavyweight during a run in the mid-1990s where he began his career with 18 consecutive knockouts. Scott's run came to an abrupt end in 1996 when Scott, having had issues with drug abuse in the past, was convicted of rape and served four years in state prison. After his release, Scott's potential faded to mere illusion. In 2002, he was KO'd at the Playboy Mansion in a bout with unheralded Francis Royal and later dropped a fight by TKO to Ray Austin in 2003, failing to come out for the eighth round.

== Crimes outside the ring ==
The fight with Austin proved to be Scott's farewell, as he has since hit another major legal roadblock. Scott was convicted of murder for an incident in 2004 in Albany's South End. . He was incarcerated in the Elmira Correctional Facility on March 23, 2005, and is serving a sentence of life without parole.

In addition to his recent run-in, Scott was also implicated in a 1995 hit-and-run that left a 4-year-old in a coma.

== Amateur career ==
- United States amateur champion - super heavyweight (1993)

Preceded by Samson Po'uha	United States Amateur Super Heavyweight Champion; 1993	Succeeded by Lance Whitaker
