= Forrest Ward =

American boxer (born 1949)

Forest Ward
Personal information
- Full name: Forest Lee Ward
- Born: January 11, 1949 (age 77) Brooklyn, New York, U.S.
- Height: 6 ft 3 in (191 cm)

Sport
- Sport: Boxing
- Weight class: Heavyweight / +81 kg (179 lb)
Medal record
Men's boxing
Representing the United States
Pan American Games
Gold medal – first place	1967 Winnipeg	Heavyweight

Forest Lee Ward (born January 11, 1949) is a retired amateur heavyweight boxer.

== Early life ==
Ward was born in Brooklyn, New York in 1949.

== Amateur career ==
In 1966 Ward won the New York Golden Gloves 175-lb Open Championship by defeating Houston Williams of the Police Athletic League Howard Houses in the finals. In 1967 Ward won the New York Golden Gloves Heavyweight Open Championship after beating Thomas Connelly in the finals. Later that year Ward won the Pan American Heavyweight Championship. Ward won the 1967 National AAU Heavyweight Championship, beating Clay Hodges by a split decision in the semifinals and Ken Norton in the finals.

== Pro career ==
Ward had a disappointing and short career as a professional, which began in 1967 after a banner year as an amateur propelled him to professional territory. After six professional fights, he stepped up in class to face Chuck Wepner in 1968 and lost after being dropped three times in the 7th round, triggering a three knockdown stoppage. After four consecutive wins, he faced Bill Drover and lost via a technical knockout. Ward retired after the loss.
