= Willard High School (Missouri) =

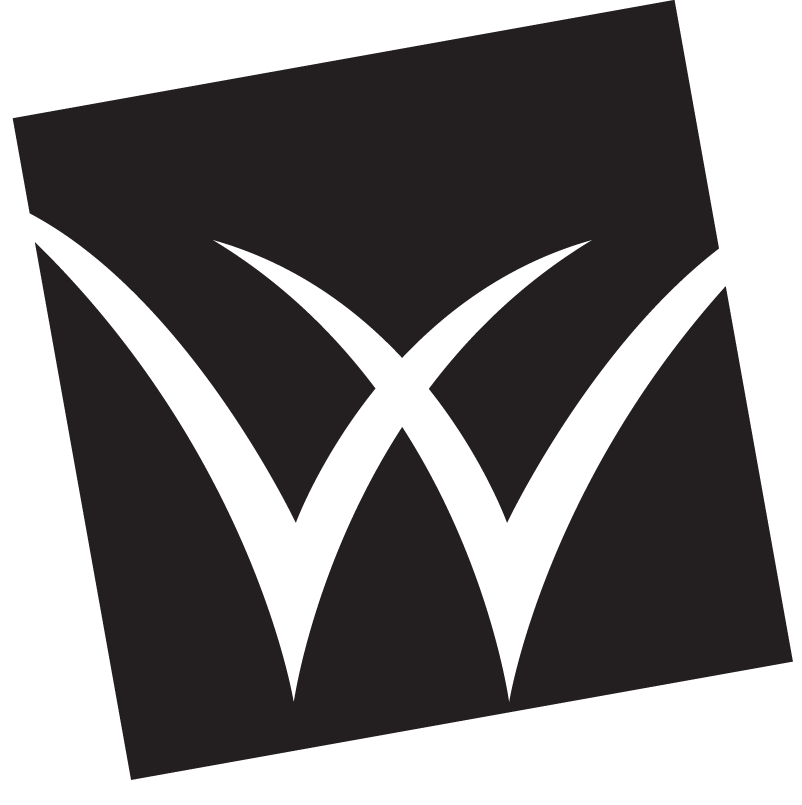

Location
- 515 E Jackson St; Willard, Missouri; United States; 37°18′05″N 93°25′01″W

Information
- Type: Public secondary school
- Established: 1922; 104 years ago
- School district: Willard R-2 School District
- Principal: Daniel Davis
- Teaching staff: 87.88 (FTE)
- Grades: 9–12
- Enrollment: 1,379 (2024–2025)
- Student to teacher ratio: 15.69
- Colors: Black, and White
- Athletics conference: Central Ozark Conference
- Mascot: Tiger
- Newspaper: Growl Gazette
- Yearbook: Willarko Yearbook
- Website: whs.willardschools.net

Willard High School is a public high school located in Willard, Missouri, United States. The school is in the Willard R-2 School District.

== Athletics ==
Willard High School's official mascot is the tiger. Willard is part of the Central Ozark Conference (COC) Large Division.

- Baseball
- Basketball – Men & Women
- Cross country – Men & Women
- Football
- Golf – Men & Women
- Soccer - Men & Women
- Track and field – Men & Women
- Volleyball – Women
- Wrestling - Men
- NJROTC - Co-ed
- Marching band - Men & Women

== Notable alumni ==
- Lori Endicott – American volleyball player (born 1967) – 1992 Olympics bronze medalist
- B.J. Flores – American boxer (born 1979)
- Forrest Merrill – American football player (born 1996)
- Jason Pyrah – American middle-distance runner (born 1969)
- Chappell Roan – American singer (born 1998)
