= Lou Savarese =

American boxer (born 1965)

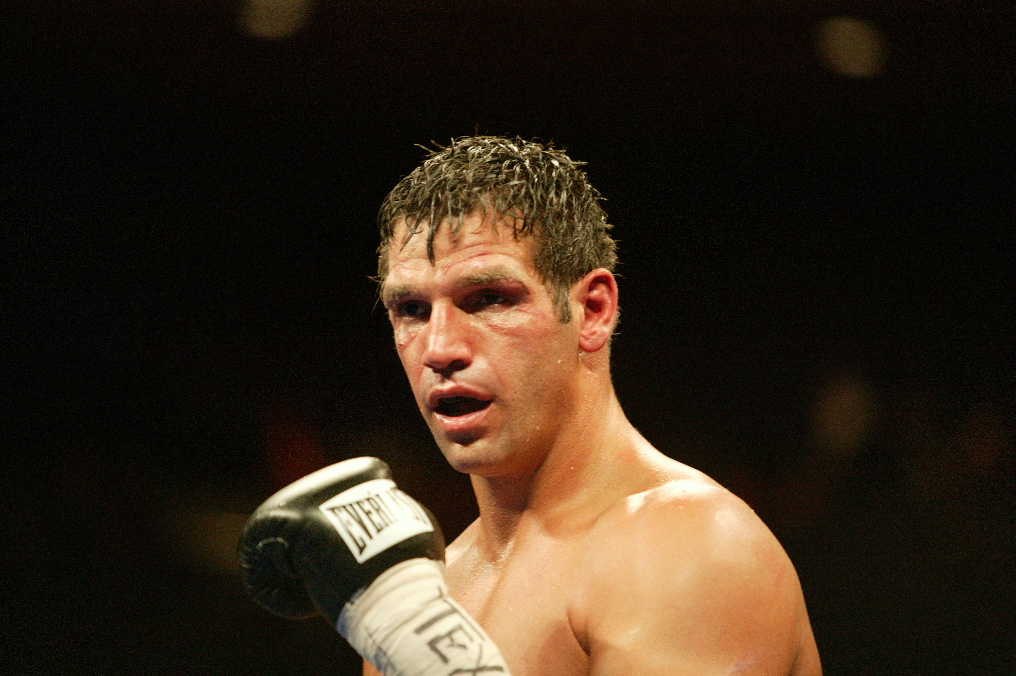
- Savarese in 2007, after losing to Evander Holyfield
- Born: July 14, 1965 (age 61); Bronx, New York, U.S.
- Nationality: American
- Height: 6 ft 5 in (1.96 m)
- Weight: Heavyweight
- Reach: 80 in (203 cm)
- Style: Orthodox
- Years active: 1989–2004, 2006–2007 (Boxing); 2013 (MMA)

Professional boxing record
- Total: 53
- Wins: 46
- By knockout: 38
- Losses: 7
- Draws: 0

Mixed martial arts record
- Total: 1
- Wins: 1
- By knockout: 1
- Losses: 0

Other information
- Boxing record from BoxRec
- Mixed martial arts record from Sherdog

Louis "Lou" Savarese (born July 14, 1965) is an American former professional boxer and mixed martial artist who competed 1989 to 2013. He is from Greenwood Lake, New York. In January 1996, Savrese won IBF USBA Heavyweight title by knocking out former contender Buster Mathis Jr. in seven rounds. On April 26, 1997, he challenged for the Lineal Heavyweight Championship, and lost by a controversial split decision to the Lineal World Heavyweight Champion George Foreman. A year later on June 25, 1998, Savarese won the IBA World Heavyweight title against former Undisputed World Heavyweight Champion Buster Douglas by way of a first-round knockout. On June 24, 2000, he lost by a first-round technical knockout to former Undisputed World Heavyweight Champion Mike Tyson. On September 22, 2002, Savarese won the vacant WBO Inter-Continental Heavyweight title, by way of a fifth-round TKO against former two-time World Heavyweight Champion Tim Witherspoon. On June 30, 2007, Savarese fought former World Heavyweight Champion Evander Holyfield. He fought with great heart but lost by unanimous decision to a sharp looking Holyfield. Savarese announced after the fight that he had given it his all but it wasn't good enough, and this would be his last bout.

== Amateur career ==
Savarese won two New York Golden Gloves Championships. Savarese won the 1985 Super-Heavyweight Novice Championship and the 1986 Super-Heavyweight Open Championship. In 1985 Savarese stopped (RSC-2) Jonathan Hill of Gleason's Gym in the finals to win the Championship and in 1986 Savarese defeated Alex Stewart of the Uptown Gym in the finals to win the Championship. In July 1986 he won gold at the U.S. Olympic Festival in Houston, Texas, defeating Kevin Ford on points (5–0) in the finals. In 1987 Savarese advanced to the finals of the Super Heavyweight Open division. He was to have met future Heavyweight Champion Riddick Bowe but Savarese was injured and could not box. In October 1987 he won the National PAL Championships in Jacksonville, Florida, defeating Farns Bryant.

Savarese trained at the Cage Recreation Center in White Plains, New York. Savarese is originally from Greenwood Lake, New York. He now resides in Houston.

His ex-wife Louisa is the biological daughter of the famous musician and outdoorsman Ted Nugent.

== Professional career ==
Savarese, a Roberts Elementarian, began his professional boxing career on April 30, 1989, knocking out James Smith (not the former world Heavyweight champion) in four rounds at Galveston, Texas. Savarese's first win by first round knockout came on his second fight, against Terrence Roberts, on May 25, at Atlantic City.

Savarese won his first eight fights by knockout. On April 19, 1990, Savarese was forced to fight an entire boxing fight for the first time, when he defeated Mike Robinson in Poughkeepsie, New York, by a six-round decision. He proceeded to win his next seven fights by knockout, and, in 1991, Kayo boxing cards published a trading card featuring Savarese.

On September 20 of that year, he and Robinson had a rematch, with Savarese knocking Robinson out in the fourth round. His next fight, against Mike Faulkner on November 26, at White Plains, New York, resulted in a five-round disqualification win for Savarese.

On November 21, 1992, Savarese fought Larry Givens, who is mostly famous for his incredible lack of success as a professional boxer. Givens retired with a record of 3–46. Savarese managed to KO Givens in the 2nd round.

Savarese ran his record to 36–0, with 30 knockouts, but he was a relatively unknown fighter: apart from the 1991 Kayo boxing trading card, no other type of media attempted to make Savarese's name a household one, partly because of the type of opposition he had met. Of Savarese's thirty six opponents, none was known to most boxing fans. So the Savarese management team came with an ingenious, and not very often seen, way to draw the public's attention towards Savarese: a Lou Savarese fan club was created, and, by the middle 1990s, the fan club was being advertised on major boxing magazines, such as Ring and KO. The advertisement offered free membership to anyone, and promised free personalized, autographed photos to each new member.

The idea worked, and Savarese was next faced with his first relatively known opponent, Buster Mathis Jr. This fight was for the NABF's vacant regional Heavyweight title, and Savarese won the title on November 1, 1996, by knocking Mathis out in round seven, at Indio, California.

Next was a major fight against former two-time world Heavyweight champion George Foreman. The fight was held on April 26, 1997, in Atlantic City. It was Savarese's HBO Boxing television show's debut, and for the WBU "world Heavyweight title" and the Lineal Heavyweight Championship. While Savarese lost for the first time, he nevertheless impressed boxing critics and fans, many of whom felt he deserved the split decision that was given to Foreman. Savarese lost by scorecards of 110–118, 112-115 and a favorable 114–113.

Based on his performance against Foreman, the outcome of his next fight, against David Izon on November 1, was considered to be a mild upset. Savarese and Izon fought at New York's famed Apollo Theater, and Savarese suffered his first knockout defeat, when Izon beat him in five rounds.

But Savarese would rebound by scoring two important wins: on April 23, 1998, he defeated Jeff Lally by a knockout in round two at the Sheraton Hotel in Houston, and then, on June 25, he scored what was arguably his biggest career win, beating Buster Douglas, a former world Heavyweight champion and the first man to beat Mike Tyson, by knockout in the first round to win IBA's "World" Heavyweight title.

After that, he fought only twice in 1999, winning a split decision over then prospect Lance "Mount" Whitaker and losing by ten-round decision against future Lennox Lewis world championship challenger Michael Grant, on June 19 at New York's Madison Square Garden.

More than one year later, on June 24, 2000, Savarese had his first fight abroad, when he faced Tyson in Glasgow, Scotland. The fight was stopped thirty eight seconds into the first round. While attempting to stop Tyson, referee John Coyle was accidentally pulled to the floor by him. Tyson was declared the winner by technical knockout.

Savarese remained active, and, after two wins, he beat David Bostice on November 2, 2001, by a twelve-round decision.

Another major win for Savarese came on September 22, 2002, when he beat former two-time world Heavyweight champion Tim Witherspoon by a knockout in round five at Friant, California.

On March 15, 2003, he lost the title to former John Ruiz world title challenger Kirk Johnson, who knocked Savarese out in four rounds at Dallas.

Attempting to win another regional Heavyweight title, Savarese fought Leo Nolan, for the IBA's vacant Americas Heavyweight title, but he lost to Nolan by a twelve-round unanimous decision on May 7, 2004. Lou Savarese returned to the ring on March 18, 2006, stopping Marcus Rhode in two rounds at Convention Center in Fort Smith, Arkansas. His record then stood at 44-6, with 36 wins by knockouts.

Savarese is trained by Jesse Reid, who survived a shooting in 1984 when another of his boxers, former WBC world Jr. Welterweight champion Bruce Curry shot him two days after losing to Billy Costello.

Lou Savarese continued his comeback by stopping Travis Fulton in 3 rounds on January 18, 2007, in Houston TX. Savarese showed he still had decent ability and brought his record to 45-6, 37 wins by knockout.

On June 30, 2007, Savarese fought former Heavyweight Champion Evander Holyfield. He fought with great heart but lost by decision to a sharp looking Holyfield. Savarese announced after the fight that he had given it his all but it wasn't good enough, and this would be his last bout.

== Mixed martial arts career ==
Having long been fascinated with MMA, Savarese announced his debut to the sport in 2013 at age of 47. For his training, Savarese practiced Muay Thai, and utilized taekwondo training he did as a teenager to sharpen his longstanding kicking prowess. On June 20, 2013, Savarese competed in a bout against Tim Papp. He won the fight by first-round TKO after a doctor stoppage when he landed an uppercut that dropped Papp, after being taken down once, and Papp being the aggressor for the first thirty seconds.

== Acting career ==
Savarese has been featured in episodes of The Jury, Guiding Light, The Sopranos, Damages, and Rescue Me as well as the movie We Own the Night. He also played a lead role in ESPN’s documentary Cinderella Man: The James J. Braddock Story, for which he received excellent reviews for his portrayal of boxer Max Baer. Other recent works include the independent film Nicky’s Game, A Matter of Honor, and Knock, Knock, a horror film in which he plays Rico, the villain. He also made a cameo appearance in an episode of Law & Order SVU, Season 6 Episode 18 titled "Pure"; playing a police officer named Officer Baxter.

== Professional boxing record ==
53 fights	46 wins	7 losses
By knockout	38	3
By decision	7	4
By disqualification	1	0

No.	Result	Record	Opponent	Type	Round, time	Date	Location	Notes
53	Loss	46–7	Evander Holyfield	UD	10	Jun 30, 2007	Don Haskins Convention Center, El Paso, Texas, U.S	
52	Win	46–6	Matt Hicks	KO	1 (8) 2:27	Apr 5, 2007	Grand Plaza Hotel, Houston, Texas, U.S	
51	Win	45–6	Travis Fulton	TKO	3 (6), 1:31	Jan 18, 2007	Grand Plaza Hotel, Houston Texas, U.S	
50	Win	44–6	Marcus Rhode	TKO	2 (6) 2:01	Mar 18, 2006	Convention Center, Fort Smith, Arkansas, U.S	
49	Loss	43–6	Leo Nolan	UD	12	May 7, 2004	Foxwoods Resort, Mashantucket, Connecticut, U.S	For IBA Continental Americas heavyweight title.
48	Loss	43–5	Kirk Johnson	TKO	4 (12), 1:52	Mar 15, 2003	Club Life, Dallas, Texas U.S	Lost WBO Inter-Continental heavyweight title.
47	Win	43–4	Tim Witherspoon	TKO	5 (12), 2:42	Sep 22, 2002	Table Mountain Casino, Friant, California, U.S	Won vacant WBO Inter-Continental heavyweight title.
46	Win	42–4	David Bosticue	UD	12	Nov 2, 2001	Foxwoods Resort, Mashantucket, Connecticut, U.S	Won vacant IBA Continental Americas heavyweight title.
45	Win	41–4	Tom Glesby	TKO	3 (10), 1:13	Jun 12, 2001	Astro Pavilion, Houston, Texas, U.S	
44	Win	40–4	Marcus Rhode	TKO	2 (10), 0:39	May 2, 2001	Astro Pavilion, Houston, Texas, U.S	
43	Loss	39–4	Mike Tyson	TKO	1 (10), 0:38	Jun 24, 2000	Hampden Park, Glasgow, Scotland	
42	Loss	39–3	Michael Grant	UD	10	Jun 19, 1999	Madison Square Garden, New York, U.S	
41	Win	39–2	Lance Whitaker	SD	10	Mar 6, 1999	Convention Center, Atlantic City, New Jersey, U.S	
40	Win	38–2	Buster Douglas	KO	1 (12), 2:34	Jun 25, 1998	Foxwoods Resort, Mashantucket, Connecticut, U.S	Won vacant IBA heavyweight title.
39	Win	37–2	Jeff Lally	TKO	2 (10), 1:23	Apr 23, 1998	Sheraton Hotel, Houston, Texas, U.S	
38	Loss	36–2	David Izon	KO	5 (10), 2:44	Nov 1, 1997	Apollo Theater, New York, U.S	
37	Loss	36–1	George Foreman	SD	12	Apr 26, 1997	Convention Center, Atlantic City, New Jersey, U.S	For WBU heavyweight title.
36	Win	36–0	Buster Mathis Jr.	TKO	7 (12), 2:52	Jan 11, 1996	Fantasy Springs Casino, Indio, California, U.S	Won vacant USBA heavyweight title.
35	Win	35–0	Tim Puller	TKO	2 (10), 2:51	Aug 20, 1996	Madison Square Garden Theater, New York, U.S.	
34	Win	34–0	Lyle McDowell	TKO	2 (10), 2:26	Jan 12, 1996	Madison Square Garden, New York, U.S	
33	Win	33–0	Sean Hart	TKO	2 (10), 1:39	Dec 2, 1995	Atlantic City, New Jersey, U.S	
32	Win	32–0	Olian Alexander	TKO	6 (10) 2:43	Oct 6, 1995	Atlantic City, New Jersey, U.S.	
31	Win	31–0	Edgar Turpin	KO	1 (?)	Aug 18, 1995	Middletown, New York, U.S.	
30	Win	30–0	Brian Morgan	PTS	8	Mar 5, 1995	Civic Assembly Center, Muskogee, Oklahoma, U.S	
29	Win	29–0	Ken Merritt	TKO	4 (10), 1:06	Nov 5, 1994	Caesars Tahoe, Stateline, Nevada, U.S	
28	Win	28–0	Henry Wilson	KO	1 (8)	Sep 13, 1994	Marriott Hotel, Kansas City, Missouri, U.S	
27	Win	27–0	Bill Duncan	KO	1 (?)	Mar 1, 1994	Jefferson City, Missouri, U.S.	
26	Win	26–0	Nathaniel Fitch	UD	10	Apr 17, 1993	Fermwood Resort, Bushkill, Pennsylvania, U.S	
25	Win	25–0	Fred Whitaker	KO	6 (10)	Dec 23, 1992	Westchester County Center, White Plains, New York, U.S	
24	Win	24–0	Larry Givens	KO	2 (8), 2:13	Nov 21, 1992	Beban Park, Nanaimo, British Columbia, Canada	
23	Win	23–0	Elvin Evans	KO	2 (10), 0:41	Mar 27, 1992	Catskill, New York, U.S	
22	Win	22–0	Mike Faulkner	DQ	5 (10)	Nov 26, 1991	Westchester County Center, White Plains, New York, U.S	
21	Win	21–0	Mike Robinson	RTD	4 (8)	Sep 20, 1991	Westchester County Center, White Plains, New York, U.S	
20	Win	20–0	Mark Young	UD	8	Jul 23, 1991	Kushers Country Club, Monticello, New York, U.S	
19	Win	19–0	Larry Smith	KO	6 (?)	Jul 2, 1991	Ragley, Louisiana, U.S	
18	Win	18–0	Max Key	KO	1 (6) 2:12	Feb 26, 1991	Birmingham, Alabama, U.S	
17	Win	17–0	Marshall Tillman	UD	6	Jan 11, 1991	Trump Taj Mahal, Atlantic City, New Jersey, U.S	
16	Win	16–0	Marcus Dorsey	KO	2 (6)	Dec 4, 1990	Vinton, Louisiana, U.S	
15	Win	15–0	James Ruffin	KO	1 (?)	Oct 25, 1990	Texas Longhorn Club, Vinton, Louisiana, U.S	
14	Win	14–0	Travis Pickering	KO	1 (8) 1:21	Oct 6, 1990	Great Falls, Montana, U.S	
13	Win	13–0	Barry Kirton	KO	2 (8)	Aug 14, 1990	City Center, Saratoga Springs, New York, U.S	
12	Win	12–0	James Ruffin	KO	2 (?)	Jul 17, 1990	Lake Charles, Louisiana, U.S	
11	Win	11–0	Dan Ross	KO	1 (6), 2:59	Jul 4, 1990	Phillips County Backgrounds, Billings, Montana, U.S	
10	Win	10–0	Andre Crowder	TKO	1 (6)	May 18, 1990	Callicoon, New York, U.S	
9	Win	9–0	Mike Robinson	PTS	6	Apr 19, 1990	Poughkeepsie, New York, U.S	
8	Win	8–0	Ken Elliott	KO	2 (?)	Mar 15, 1990	Fairmont Hotel, Dallas, Texas, U.S	
7	Win	7–0	Melvin Young	KO	2 (?)	Dec 11, 1989	Convention Center, Pasadena, Texas, U.S	
6	Win	6–0	Randy Rivers	TKO	2 (4)	Nov 24, 1989	Broome County Arena, Binghamton, New York, U.S	
5	Win	5–0	John Basil Jackson	KO	1 (?)	Nov 10, 1989	Villa Roma Resort, Callicoon, New York, U.S	
4	Win	4–0	Alan Jamison	KO	1 (?)	Oct 24, 1989	Kemper Arena, Kansas City, Missouri, U.S	
3	Win	3–0	Robert Horton	KO	1 (?)	Oct 5, 1989	Houston, Texas, U.S	
2	Win	2–0	Terence Roberts	TKO	1 (?)	May 25, 1989	Resorts International, Atlantic City, New Jersey, U.S	
1	Win	1–0	James Smith	KO	4 (?)	Apr 30, 1989	Moody Center, Galveston, Texas, U.S	

Titles in boxing

Minor world titles

IBA world heavyweight champion (200+ lbs)

Regional/International titles

IBA Continental Americas heavyweight champion (200+ lbs)

WBO intercontinental heavyweight champion (200+ lbs)

USBA heavyweight champion (200+ lbs)

== Mixed martial arts record ==
Professional record breakdown
1 match	1 win	0 losses
By knockout	1	0

Res.	Record	Opponent	Method	Event	Date	Round	Time	Location	Notes
Win	1–0	Tim Papp	TKO	Savarese Promotions	June 20, 2013	1	1:47	Bayou City Event Center, Houston, Texas, United States	MMA debut.

Achievements
Vacant Title last held by Julius Francis	WBO heavyweight champion Inter-Continental title October 22, 2002 – May 15, 2003	Succeeded by Kirk Johnson
Minor world boxing titles
Vacant Title last held by George Foreman	IBA heavyweight champion June 25, 1998 – October 2, 1999; Stripped	Vacant Title next held by James Toney
