= Derrell Dixon =

American boxer

Derrell Dixon (born October 31, 1970, in Portland, Oregon) is an American former professional boxer who competed from 1997 to 2001. As an amateur, he was a two-time United States Amateur Heavyweight Champion.

== Amateur career ==
Dixon had an outstanding amateur career prior to turning professional. He won the National AAU Heavyweight Championship in 1993 and 1994.

== Professional career ==
Known as "Double D", Dixon turned professional in 2000 and had limited success. He came up short in each attempt to step up in competition, losing fights to future contenders Owen Beck, Friday Ahunanya, Serguei Lyakhovich, and China Smith.

Preceded by Shannon Briggs	United States Amateur Heavyweight Champion; 1993 - 1994	Succeeded by Lamon Brewster
