= George Foreman vs. Lou Savarese =

Boxing match

Power Brokers
- Date: April 26, 1997
- Venue: Convention Hall, Atlantic City, New Jersey, U.S.
- Title(s) on the line: WBU and lineal heavyweight titles

Tale of the tape
Boxer	George Foreman	Lou Savarese
Nickname	Big	
Hometown	Houston, Texas, U.S.	Greenwood Lake, New York, U.S.
Purse	$4,000,000	$500,000
Pre-fight record	75–4 (68 KO)	36–0 (30 KO)
Age	48 years, 3 months	31 years, 9 months
Height	6 ft 4 in (193 cm)	6 ft 5 in (196 cm)
Weight	253 lb (115 kg)	230 lb (104 kg)
Style	Orthodox	Orthodox
Recognition	WBU, IBA and Lineal; Heavyweight Champion; Former Undisputed Heavyweight champion	WBA; No. 9 Ranked Heavyweight; Former USBA Heavyweight champion

Result
- Foreman wins via SD (118–110, 115–112, 113–114)

George Foreman vs. Lou Savarese, billed as Power Brokers was a professional boxing match contested on April 26, 1997, for the WBU and lineal heavyweight titles.

== Background ==
After successfully defending both his lineal world heavyweight title and the lightly regarded WBU heavyweight title in an uninspired win against little-known Crawford Grimsley in November 1996, it was announced in March 1997 that George Foreman would return to the ring face undefeated fringe contender Lou Savarese. The 31-year old Savarese was a perfect 36–0 and was coming off the biggest win of his career, having knocked out Buster Mathis Jr. in the seventh round the previous November, and came into the fight as a 7–5 favorite over the now 48-year old Foreman. Foreman once again reunited with legendary trainer Angelo Dundee, whom had been his corner since he had challenged Evander Holyfield for the undisputed heavyweight title in 1991. Said Dundee about Foreman before the fight "He's in the best shape I've ever seen him since his comeback."

== The fight ==
In what was a close fight, Forman earned a split decision victory, with two judge's scoring the fight 118–110 and 115–112 in his favor, while the third scored the fight for Savarese 114–113. Foreman started the fight as the aggressor and opened up a four-inch gash above Savarese's left eyelid that hindered Savarese the rest of the fight. Savarese, forced to fight Foreman on the inside due to his eye injury, gave an impressive performance, throwing and landing many punches throughout the fight, though Foreman was able to withstand them. In the eleventh round, Foreman, wanting to win by knockout, swung wildly at Savarese, though Savarese would withstand Foreman' blows. Also in the eleventh, Savarese was deducted a point for an inadvertent low blow during the final minute, though the deduction had no bearing on the final scorecards.

== Aftermath ==
Following his win over Savarese, Foreman was given the opportunity to face Lennox Lewis for Lewis' WBC heavyweight title, with Foreman first having to win an "eliminator" bout against a contender. The WBC supplied Foreman with a list of acceptable opponents, including future heavyweight champions Chris Byrd and Hasim Rahman and the recently returned former Undisputed Heavyweight Champion James "Buster" Douglas, though Foreman ultimately picked Shannon Briggs.

== Fight card ==
Confirmed bouts:

Weight Class	Weight		vs.		Method	Round	Notes
Heavyweight	200+ lbs.	George Foreman (c)	def	Lou Savarese	SD	12/12	^{Note 1}
Heavyweight	200+ lbs.	Maurice Harris	def.	Sam Hampton	TKO	4/10
Heavyweight	200+ lbs.	Willie Williams	def.	Earl Clark	UD	6
Welterweight	147 lbs.	Fernando Vargas	def.	Claude Staten	TKO	2/4
Heavyweight	200+ lbs.	Derrick Jefferson	def.	Ralph West	KO	1/4
Heavyweight	200+ lbs.	Josué Blocus	def.	Russell Pugh	KO	1/4

^Note 1 For WBU and lineal heavyweight titles

== Broadcasting ==
Country	Broadcaster
United States	HBO

Preceded by vs. Crawford Grimsley	George Foreman's bouts 26 April 1997	Succeeded by vs. Shannon Briggs
Preceded by vs. Buster Mathis Jr.	Lou Savarese's bouts 26 April 1997	Succeeded by vs. David Izon
