= Willard, Missouri =

Willard
- City
- Location of Willard, Missouri
- Coordinates: 37°17′40″N 93°25′24″W
- Country: United States
- State: Missouri
- County: Greene

Government
  - Type: Mayor–council
  - Mayor: Samuel Snider

Area
  - Total: 6.05 sq mi (15.67 km^{2})
  - Land: 6.05 sq mi (15.67 km^{2})
  - Water: 0 sq mi (0.00 km^{2})
- Elevation: 1,237 ft (377 m)

Population (2020)
  - Total: 6,344
  - Density: 1,048.9/sq mi (404.97/km^{2})
- Time zone: UTC-6 (Central (CST))
  - Summer (DST): UTC-5 (CDT)
- ZIP Code: 65781
- Area code: 417
- FIPS code: 29-79882
- GNIS feature ID: 0735917
- Website: cityofwillard.org

Willard is a city in Greene County, Missouri, United States. As of the 2020 census, the city population was 6,344. It is part of the Springfield, Missouri Metropolitan Statistical Area.

== History ==
The city of Willard was founded in 1884 and incorporated in 1949. Willard's main east–west road, U.S. 160, is known as Olympian Boulevard because two graduates of Willard High School have participated in the Olympics. Although the town remains relatively small in size, the city of Willard has undergone considerable growth in recent years and still continues to grow.

== Geography ==
Willard is located at 37°17′40″N 93°25′24″W (37.294429, -93.423218).

According to the United States Census Bureau, the city has a total area of 5.92 square miles (15.33 km^{2}), all land.

== Demographics ==
Historical population
Census	Pop.	Note	%±
1960	357		—
1970	1,018		185.2%
1980	1,799		76.7%
1990	2,177		21.0%
2000	3,193		46.7%
2010	5,288		65.6%
2020	6,344		20.0%
U.S. Decennial Census

=== 2020 census ===
As of the 2020 census, Willard had a population of 6,344. The median age was 33.5 years. 29.2% of residents were under the age of 18 and 11.8% of residents were 65 years of age or older. For every 100 females there were 92.8 males, and for every 100 females age 18 and over there were 84.9 males age 18 and over.

95.5% of residents lived in urban areas, while 4.5% lived in rural areas.

There were 2,359 households in Willard, of which 41.0% had children under the age of 18 living in them. Of all households, 51.2% were married-couple households, 13.5% were households with a male householder and no spouse or partner present, and 28.0% were households with a female householder and no spouse or partner present. About 23.5% of all households were made up of individuals and 9.4% had someone living alone who was 65 years of age or older.

There were 2,426 housing units, of which 2.8% were vacant. The homeowner vacancy rate was 0.5% and the rental vacancy rate was 3.7%.

Racial composition as of the 2020 census
Race	Number	Percent
White	5,668	89.3%
Black or African American	55	0.9%
American Indian and Alaska Native	49	0.8%
Asian	27	0.4%
Native Hawaiian and Other Pacific Islander	4	0.1%
Some other race	76	1.2%
Two or more races	465	7.3%
Hispanic or Latino (of any race)	230	3.6%

=== 2010 census ===
As of the census of 2010, there were 5,288 people, 1,901 households, and 1,455 families living in the city. The population density was 893.2 inhabitants per square mile (344.9/km^{2}). There were 2,038 housing units at an average density of 344.3 per square mile (132.9/km^{2}). The racial makeup of the city was 96.4% White, 0.9% African American, 0.6% Native American, 0.1% Asian, 0.1% Pacific Islander, 0.3% from other races, and 1.8% from two or more races. Hispanic or Latino of any race were 1.8% of the population.

There were 1,901 households, of which 45.9% had children under the age of 18 living with them, 59.8% were married couples living together, 11.9% had a female householder with no husband present, 4.8% had a male householder with no wife present, and 23.5% were non-families. 19.2% of all households were made up of individuals, and 7.3% had someone living alone who was 65 years of age or older. The average household size was 2.75 and the average family size was 3.13.

The median age in the city was 32.2 years. 30.7% of residents were under the age of 18; 8.1% were between the ages of 18 and 24; 31% were from 25 to 44; 19.9% were from 45 to 64; and 10.2% were 65 years of age or older. The gender makeup of the city was 48.4% male and 51.6% female.

=== 2000 census ===
As of the census of 2000, there were 3,193 people, 1,154 households, and 909 families living in the city. The population density was 575.2 inhabitants per square mile (222.1/km^{2}). There were 1,226 housing units at an average density of 220.9 per square mile (85.3/km^{2}). The racial makeup of the city was 97.75% White, 0.16% African American, 0.66% Native American, 0.09% Asian, 0.22% from other races, and 1.13% from two or more races. Hispanic or Latino of any race were 0.53% of the population.

There were 1,154 households, out of which 45.7% had children under the age of 18 living with them, 64.8% were married couples living together, 11.3% had a female householder with no husband present, and 21.2% were non-families. 18.7% of all households were made up of individuals, and 9.8% had someone living alone who was 65 years of age or older. The average household size was 2.76 and the average family size was 3.14.

In the city the population was spread out, with 32.5% under the age of 18, 7.5% from 18 to 24, 33.0% from 25 to 44, 17.0% from 45 to 64, and 10.1% who were 65 years of age or older. The median age was 32 years. For every 100 females, there were 89.9 males. For every 100 females age 18 and over, there were 86.5 males.

The median income for a household in the city was $39,565, and the median income for a family was $43,646. Males had a median income of $29,420 versus $20,370 for females. The per capita income for the city was $15,253. About 9.3% of families and 9.6% of the population were below the poverty line, including 10.6% of those under age 18 and 12.6% of those age 65 or over.

== Education ==
Willard is within the Willard R-2 School District. It is a 4/5-A school district containing five elementary schools, two intermediate schools, one middle school, and one high school and is in the Central Ozark Conference – Large division.

In 2016, the fine arts programs at Willard received national recognition: Willard High School was named one of the nation's best in music education. Furthermore, the Willard Naval Junior Reserve Officers' Training Corps unit has achieved national level success in more than ten national level drill, athletic, and academic competitions, most recently in April 2022, placing 26th out of 620 units in the nation. Athletically the Tigers have achieved success in nearly all sports. The Tigers baseball team had state Final Four appearances in 2012 and 2013. The Tigers boys basketball team had state Final four appearances in 2005 and 2007.

Willard East, Willard North, Willard South, Willard Central, and Willard Orchard Hills (built in 2011) make up the elementary schools. Willard Intermediate-North, Willard Intermediate-South (built in 2019), Willard Middle, and Willard High make up the rest of the schools.

== People ==
- John Ashcroft – Politician
- Lori Endicott – Olympic volleyballer (bronze medal, 1992 Barcelona Olympics)
- B.J. Flores – Professional boxer
- Tom Greenwade – Baseball scout
- Forrest Merrill – Professional football player (Los Angeles Chargers)
- Jason Pyrah – Olympic track and field athlete (1996 and 2000)
- Chappell Roan – Singer/songwriter
