= Forrest Merrill =

American football player (born 1996)

Profile
- Position: Defensive end

Personal information
- Born: August 15, 1996 (age 30); Willard, Missouri, U.S.
- Listed height: 6 ft 0 in (1.83 m)
- Listed weight: 322 lb (146 kg)

Career information
- High school: Willard
- College: Arkansas State
- NFL draft: 2021: undrafted

Career history
- Los Angeles Chargers (2021–2022); Seattle Seahawks (2023)*; Denver Broncos (2023)*
- * Offseason or practice squad member only

Awards and highlights
- 2× Second-team All-Sun Belt (2018, 2020)

Career NFL statistics
- Total tackles: 4
- Sacks: 0
- Stats at Pro Football Reference

Forrest Merrill (born August 15, 1996) is an American professional football defensive end. He played college football for Arkansas State.

== Professional career ==
Pre-draft measurables
Height	Weight	Arm length	Hand span	40-yard dash	10-yard split	20-yard split	20-yard shuttle	Three-cone drill	Vertical jump	Broad jump	Bench press
6 ft 0 in (1.83 m)	322 lb (146 kg)	32 in (0.81 m)	9 1/4 in (0.23 m)	5.30 s	1.83 s	3.08 s	4.81 s	8.24 s	26.5 in (0.67 m)	8 ft 5 in (2.57 m)	36 reps
All values from Pro Day

=== Los Angeles Chargers ===
Merrill was signed by the Los Angeles Chargers as an undrafted free agent on May 1, 2021. He made the initial 53-man roster, but was waived on September 1, 2021, and then re-signed to the team's practice squad. Merrill was promoted to the Chargers' active roster on October 4, 2021. He was waived on October 30 and re-signed to the practice squad. He signed a reserve/future contract with the Chargers on January 11, 2022.

On August 15, 2022, Merrill was waived/injured by the Chargers.

=== Seattle Seahawks ===
On May 15, 2023, Merrill was signed by the Seattle Seahawks. He was released on June 2.

=== Denver Broncos ===
On August 5, 2023, Merrill signed with the Denver Broncos. He was waived by the team on August 16.
