= List of United States national amateur boxing heavyweight champions =

Below is a list of National Amateur Boxing Heavyweight Champions, also known as US Amateur Champions, along with the state or region which they represented. The United States National Boxing Championships bestow the title of United States Amateur Champion on amateur boxers for winning the annual national amateur boxing tournament organized by USA Boxing, the national governing body for Olympic boxing and is the United States' member organization of the International Amateur Boxing Association (AIBA). It is one of four premier amateur boxing tournaments, the others being the National Golden Gloves Tournament, which crowns its own amateur heavyweight champion, the Police Athletic League Tournament, and the United States Armed Forces Tournament, all sending champions to the US Olympic Trials. The Heavyweight division is contested at a weight class of 201 pounds.

- 1891 - A. Isaaca, New York, NY
- 1892 - Not held
- 1893 - D.A. Whilihere, MBC
- 1894 - J. Kennedy, New York, NY
- 1895 - W.D. Osgood, Univ. of Pennsylvania
- 1896 - George Schwegler, New York, NY and J.G. Eberie, Pastime A.C.
- 1897 - D. Herty, New York, NY
- 1898 - Not Held
- 1899 - J.B. Knipe, New York, NY
- 1900 - J.B. Knipe, New York, NY
- 1901 - W. Rodenbach, New York, NY
- 1902 - Emery Payne, Mott Haven
- 1903 - Emery Payne, Mott Haven
- 1904 - W. Rodenbach, New York, NY
- 1905 - Emery Payne, Mott Haven
- 1906 - W. Schulken, San Francisco, CA
- 1907 - Emery Payne, New York, NY
- 1908 - Thomas Kennedy, New York, NY
- 1909 - Philip Schlossberg, New Jersey
- 1910 - Warren Barbour, New York, NY
- 1911 - John Serino, Boston, MA
- 1912 - John Silverio, Beverly, MA
- 1913 - Al Reich, New York, NY
- 1914 - P.L. Kelly, Roxbury, MA
- 1915 - A. Sheridan, Brooklyn, NY
- 1916 - Carlo Armstrong, Boston, MA
- 1917 - John Gaddi, New York, NY
- 1918 - Martin Burke, New Orleans, LA
- 1919 - Eddie Eagan, Denver, CO
- 1920 - Karl Wicks, Dorchester, MA
- 1921 - Gordon Munce, New York, NY
- 1922 - John Willman, San Francisco, CA
- 1923 - Thomas Kirby, Boston, MA
- 1924 - E.G. Greathouse, Washington, DC
- 1925 - Joe Woods, Los Angeles, CA
- 1926 - Armand Emanuel, San Francisco, CA
- 1927 - Milo Mallory, San Francisco, CA
- 1928 - George Hoffman, New York, NY
- 1929 - Ralph Ficucello, New York, NY
- 1930 - Jack Pallat, Cleveland, OH
- 1931 - Jack Pallat, Cleveland, OH
- 1932 - Fred Feary, Stockton, CA
- 1933 - Izzy Richeter, Philadelphia, PA
- 1934 - S. Evens, Highland Park, MI
- 1935 - Lou Nova, San Francisco, CA
- 1936 - Williard Dean, Shreveport, LA
- 1937 - James Robinson, Philadelphia, PA
- 1938 - Daniel Merritt, Cleveland, OH
- 1939 - Tony Novak, Chicago, IL
- 1940 - W. Gross, East Orange, NJ
- 1941 - R. Kinney, Hartman, AR
- 1942 - Paul Komar], Pittsburgh, PA
- 1943 - Walter Moore, Chicago, IL
- 1944 - Richard Vaughn, Lancaster, PA
- 1945 - Charles Lester, Cleveland, OH
- 1946 - Charles Lester, Cleveland, OH
- 1947 - Willie Clemmons, Indiana
- 1948 - Coley Wallace, New York, NY
- 1949 - Rex Layne, Salt Lake City, UT
- 1950 - Norvel Lee, Washington, DC
- 1951 - Norvel Lee, Washington, DC
- 1952 - Jack Scheberies, Oakland, CA
- 1953 - Pete Rademacher, Yakima, WA
- 1954 - Reuben Vargas, San Francisco, CA
- 1955 - George Moore, Detroit, MI
- 1956 - Jim McCarter, Seattle, WA
- 1957 - Lee Williams, Boston, MA
- 1958 - James Blythe, Hartford, CT
- 1959 - James Blythe, Hartford, CT
- 1960 - Harold Espy, University of Idaho
- 1961 - Rudy Davis, Philadelphia, PA
- 1962 - Wyce Westbrook, Cincinnati, OH
- 1963 - Vic Brown, Fort Lewis, WA
- 1964 - Buster Mathis, Grand Rapids, MI
- 1965 - Boone Kirkman, Renton, WA
- 1966 - James Howard, Buffalo, NY
- 1967 - Forrest Ward, New York, NY
- 1968 - George Foreman, Houston, TX
- 1969 - Earnie Shavers, Cleveland, OH
- 1970 - Ron Lyle, Denver, CO
- 1971 - Duane Bobick, US Navy
- 1972 - Nick Wells, US Air Force
- 1972 - Larrell Brown, Whitehouse, Tx
- 1973 - James Chapman, Reno, NV
- 1974 - Dwayne Bonds, Detroit, MI
- 1975 - Michael Dokes, Akron, OH
- 1976 - Marvin Stinson, Philadelphia, PA
- 1977 - Greg Page, Louisville, KY
- 1978 - Greg Page, Louisville, KY
- 1979 - Tony Tubbs, Cincinnati, OH
- 1980 - Marvis Frazier, Philadelphia, PA
- 1981 - Mark Mahone, US Navy
- 1982 - Ricky Womack, Detroit, MI
- 1983 - Henry Milligan, Hockessin, DE
- 1984 - Michael Bentt, Cambria Heights, NY
- 1985 - Jerry Goff, Saucier, MS
- 1986 - Michael Bentt, Cambria Heights, NY
- 1987 - Michael Bentt, Cambria Heights, NY
- 1988 - Ray Mercer, US Army
- 1989 - Javier Alvarez, San Antonio, TX
- 1990 - Javier Alvarez, San Antonio, TX
- 1991 - John Bray, Van Nuys, CA
- 1992 - Shannon Briggs, Brooklyn, NY
- 1993 - Derrell Dixon, Lynnwood, WA
- 1994 - Derrell Dixon, Lynnwood, WA
- 1995 - Lamon Brewster, Los Angeles, CA
- 1996 - DaVarryl Williamson, Washington, DC
- 1997 - DaVarryl Williamson, Washington, DC
- 1998 - DaVarryl Williamson, Washington, DC
- 1999 - Malik Scott, Philadelphia, PA
- 2000 - Michael Bennett, Chicago, IL
- 2001 - BJ Flores, Mesa, AZ
- 2002 - BJ Flores, Glendale, AZ
- 2003 - Devin Vargas, Toledo, OH
- 2004 - Matt Godfrey, Providence, RI
- 2005 - Tony Grano, Hartford, CT
- 2006 - Adam Willett, Bellport, NY
- 2007 - Deontay Wilder, Tuscaloosa, AL
- 2008 - Jeremiah Graziano, Lenexa, KS
- 2009 - Jordan Shimmell
- 2010 - Steve Geffrard, Boca Raton, FL
- 2011 - Jordan Shimmell, Hudsonville, MI
- 2012 - Isaac Boes, Grand Rapids, MI
- 2013 - King Alexander, Hartford, CT
- 2014 - Richard Torrez, Tulare, CA
- 2018 - Christopher Quiroga Anaheim, CA
- 2021 - Demetrius Reed, Appleton, WI
- 2023 - Malachi Georges, Teaneck, New Jersey
