= Siarhei Liakhovich vs. Shannon Briggs =

Boxing match

- Date: 4 November 2006
- Venue: Chase Field, Phoenix, Arizona, U.S.
- Title on the line: WBO Heavyweight Championship

Tale of the tape
Boxer	(Belarus) Siarhei Liakhovich	(United States) Shannon Briggs
Nickname	"White Wolf"	"The Cannon"
Hometown	Vitebsk, Vitebsk Region, Belarus	Brooklyn, New York, U.S.
Purse	$746,000	$400,000
Pre-fight record	23–1 (14 KO)	47–4–1 (41 KO)
Age	30 years, 5 months	34 years, 11 months
Height	6 ft 4 in (193 cm)	6 ft 4 in (193 cm)
Weight	238 lb (108 kg)	268 lb (122 kg)
Style	Orthodox	Orthodox
Recognition	WBO; Heavyweight Champion; The Ring; No. 4 Ranked Heavyweight	WBO; No. 3 Ranked Heavyweight

Result
- Briggs defeated Liakhovich via 12th Round TKO

Siarhei Liakhovich vs. Shannon Briggs was a professional boxing match contested on 4 November 2006, for the WBO heavyweight championship.

== Background ==
Following his capture of WBO title in a slugfest with Lamon Brewster, Siarhei Liakhovich agreed to make his first defence against former Lineal Heavyweight Champion Shannon Briggs. The bout was to be held in Phoenix, Arizona, close to Liakhovich's adopted home of Scottsdale.

Briggs, who was on a 11 fight win streak (all by stoppage) since his 2002 loss to Jameel McCline, had last fought for a world title eight and half years earlier when he was stopped in five rounds by Lennox Lewis. His team had come to terms with Klitschko adviser Shelly Finkel to fight Wladimir Klitschko on 11 November at Madison Square Garden, however after the deal when unsigned Briggs opted to face Liakhovich, while Wladimir faced Calvin Brock.

In the pre fight press conference Briggs claimed that he was expecting to stop the champion early, saying "I'm looking to get him out of there early, he's a young kid. One or two rounds." Liakhovich said he planned counter the expected early Briggs onslaught, "I know he is going to come out swinging and I know he is going to try and throw a lot of hard punches, but he needs to think about every time he swings, he is going to get hit."

On the undercard Juan Diaz defended his WBA Lightweight Title against Fernando Angulo.

== The fight ==
The crowd booed throughout most of the bout, which progressed at a slow and cautious pace with either man throwing many punches. With only 27 seconds left, a pair of heavy right hands from Briggs sent Liakhovich down. He beat the count but Briggs followed it up with three more punches and about to throw another when Liakhovich fell through the ropes without being hit, which prompted the referee to wave it off. It was a TKO at 2:59 of the 12th round. At the time of the stoppage Liakhovich led on all three scorecards 106–103, 106-103 and 105–104, meaning if he had made it back into the ring after the final knockdown he would have retained the title with a majority draw.

== Aftermath ==
Speaking after the fight Liakhovich said "I didn't fight my fight. I fought his fight, It just didn't happen. I took his best shot. He caught me right on the chin. It was just a lack of punches before. I wasn't right there." Briggs meanwhile called out Wladimir Klitschko, "I've got a vendetta against him," he said in the post fight press conference. "When it comes to feelings, I want him. If it's money, or something like that, then I've got to take somebody else. But feeling-wise, I want him for what they did to me."

Brigg would make his first defence against his mandatory challenger Sultan Ibragimov in June 2007 (rearranged from March due to Brigg having pneumonia).

== Undercard ==
Confirmed bouts:

== Broadcasting ==
Country	Broadcaster
United States	Showtime

Preceded by vs. Lamon Brewster	Siarhei Liakhovich's bouts 4 November 2006	Succeeded by vs. Nikolai Valuev
Preceded by vs. Chris Koval	Shannon Briggs's bouts 4 November 2006	Succeeded by vs. Sultan Ibragimov
