= BJ Flores =

American boxer (born 1979)

Personal information
- Nickname: El Peligroso
- Born: Benjamin Flores; January 29, 1979 (age 47) San Francisco, California, U.S.
- Height: 6 ft 2 in (1.88 m)
- Weight: Cruiserweight Heavyweight

Boxing career
- Reach: 80 in (203 cm)
- Stance: Orthodox

Boxing record
- Total fights: 39
- Wins: 34
- Win by KO: 21
- Losses: 4
- Draws: 1
- No contests: 0

Benjamin "BJ" Flores (born January 29, 1979) is an American boxing trainer and former professional boxer. He challenged once for the WBC cruiserweight world title in 2016, and twice for interim world titles at cruiserweight and heavyweight.

== Personal life ==
Flores who is of Mexican descent, is the grandson of Ralph Flores, the pilot who crashed his small plane in the wilds of Canada's Yukon Territory.

Born into a boxing family, Flores began attending the gym at the age of four years while watching his father Frank Flores train his older brothers and assist Olympic coach Ken Adams train future champions Vince Phillips and Kennedy McKinney. Prior to graduating from Willard High School in Willard, Missouri, Flores was an all state selection in football and track & field. Flores was offered a full football scholarship to BYU.

Flores took two years off from BYU to serve a mission for the Church of Jesus Christ of Latter-day Saints in the Mexico Culiacan Mission. For two years Flores lived in one of the poorest areas of Mexico and helped by assisting in building houses, roofs, and other labor work for those less fortunate.

While in Culiacán, Flores began training at the same gym where Julio César Chávez trained as a child. After watching Flores hand out numerous beatings in sparring sessions, the locals began calling him "Peligroso" meaning "dangerous".

On March 16, 2023, in Medellin, Colombia while at a traffic light, Flores was shot in the leg during an attempted robbery.

== Amateur career ==
Flores had a stellar amateur career prior to turning professional. In 1997, he won the National Golden Gloves light heavyweight championship. In 2001 and 2002, He won the National Amateur heavyweight championship.

== Professional career ==
Flores made his professional debut on May 3, 2003, in Las Vegas, Nevada against Dallas Lane. Flores put three lefts together early in round one to send Lane to the canvas. He beat the count but crumpled quickly from an overhand right that caused the referee to stop the bout.

After winning his next two fights, Flores fought Gabriel Taylor on October 3, 2003, in Houston, Texas. Flores wobbled Taylor several times to the point that the referee stopped the fight in round two. Flores found himself in trouble in his next fight against Semisi Bloomfield after Flores was dropped twice in round two. However, Flores managed to come back and fight him to a draw.

Flores fought Christopher Hairston on January 24, 2004, at the Boardwalk Hall in Atlantic City, New Jersey. Flores had Hairston on the canvas twice before Hairston refused to continue. Two months later, Flores defeated Eric French by unanimous decision. On May 8, 2004, Flores knocked out Brian Maclin with a left hook.

After winning his next eight fights, Flores fought Ali Supreme on May 13, 2006, at the Arizona Veterans Memorial Coliseum in Phoenix, Arizona. Flores went on the offensive and knocked Supreme to the canvas with a vicious flurry late in the first round. Ali tried to stand but buckled, and the referee stopped the fight.

After defeating Gary Dydell, Flores fought Chris Thomas on January 19, 2007. Flores won by unanimous decision. Flores won his next two fights against Patrick Nwamu and Andy Sample.

Flores fought Darnell Wilson for the United States Boxing Association cruiserweight title on February 8, 2008, in Dover, Delaware. Flores used ring movement to avoid the aggression of Wilson on the way to a unanimous decision victory.

=== IBO Cruiserweight Championship ===
Flores lost to IBO Cruiserweight Champion Danny Green in November 2010 and by unanimous decision, the first loss of his career.

=== Fight against Beibut Shumenov ===
On July 25, 2015, Flores took on Kazakhstan’s Beibut Shumenov in a Premier Boxing Champions fight night at the Palms Casino Resort, Las Vegas. The fight was broadcast live on NBCSN. Flores pressed the action throughout, serving as the aggressor much of the night. Shumenov began ramping up his offense more in Round 8, throwing combinations and taking advantage of a tiring Flores. Flores crushed Shumenov with a hard right in Round 12 but it was too late in the fight for him to capitalize further, resulting in unanimous decision win for Shumenov and the capture of the interim WBA World cruiserweight title.

On 15 October 2016, BJ Flores challenged Tony Bellew for the WBC cruiserweight title, in Bellew's hometown of Liverpool. Flores started the fight off well, but then got dropped three times in the second round. Finally, in the third round, the defending champion dropped Flores a fourth time for the final count.

On 11 August 2018, Flores fought Trevor Bryan for the vacant interim WBA heavyweight title. Bryan dropped Flores six times, and closed the fight in four rounds.

== Career as commentator ==
As Flores continued to climb the ranks in the 200-pound division, Flores began pulling double duty by 2012, working as a ringside analyst, and he is now part of the Premier Boxing Champions on NBC broadcast team. In 2016, he served as part of NBC's team covering boxing at the Rio Olympics.

== Career as boxing trainer ==
From 2021 to 2023, Flores worked as a full-time boxing trainer for professional boxer and social media personality Jake Paul. Flores has also worked for other social media personalities such as Josh Brueckner, Tristan Hamm, and Wade Plemons.

== Professional boxing record ==
39 fights	34 wins	4 losses
By knockout	21	2
By decision	13	2
Draws	1	

No.	Result	Record	Opponent	Type	Round, time	Date	Location	Notes
39	Loss	34–4–1	Trevor Bryan	TKO	4 (12), 2:58	11 Aug 2018	Celebrity Theatre, Phoenix, Arizona, US	For vacant interim WBA heavyweight title
38	Win	34–3–1	Nick Guivas	UD	6	24 Jun 2017	Celebrity Theatre, Phoenix, Arizona, US	
37	Win	33–3–1	Jeremy Bates	TKO	1 (10), 2:51	25 Feb 2017	Celebrity Theatre, Phoenix, Arizona, US	
36	Loss	32–3–1	Tony Bellew	TKO	3 (12), 2:11	15 Oct 2016	Echo Arena, Liverpool, Merseyside, England, UK	For WBC cruiserweight title
35	Win	32–2–1	Roberto Santos	UD	6	21 May 2016	The Cosmopolitan, Las Vegas, Nevada, US	
34	Loss	31–2–1	Beibut Shumenov	UD	12	25 Jul 2015	Palms Casino Resort, Las Vegas, Nevada, US	For interim WBA cruiserweight title
33	Win	31–1–1	Kevin Engel	TKO	3 (8), 1:19	8 Oct 2014	Beau Rivage Resort & Casino, Biloxi, Mississippi, US	
32	Win	30–1–1	Anthony Caputo Smith	UD	8	27 Jun 2014	Hard Rock Hotel and Casino, Las Vegas, Nevada, US	
31	Win	29–1–1	Adam Collins	KO	1 (6), 1:58	10 May 2014	USC Galen Center, Los Angeles, California, US	
30	Win	28–1–1	David McNemar	TKO	2 (10), 2:14	6 Oct 2012	Shrine Mosque, Springfield, Missouri, US	Retained WBO NABO cruiserweight title; Won vacant WBA-NABA cruiserweight title
29	Win	27–1–1	Hugo Pineda	TKO	6 (10), 2:34	28 Jan 2012	Shrine Mosque, Springfield, Springfield, Missouri, US	
28	Win	26–1–1	Paul Jennette	UD	10	15 Oct 2011	O'Reilly Family Event Center, Drury University, Springfield, Missouri, US	Won vacant WBA Fedelatin and WBC Continental Americas cruiserweight titles
27	Win	25–1–1	Nicholas Iannuzzi	RTD	5 (10), 3:00	23 Jul 2011	O'Reilly Family Event Center, Drury University, Springfield, Missouri, US	Won vacant NABA USA cruiserweight title
26	Loss	24–1–1	Danny Green	UD	12	17 Nov 2010	Challenge Stadium, Mount Claremont, Western Australia, Australia	For IBO cruiserweight title
25	Win	24–0–1	Epifanio Mendoza	TKO	4 (10), 1:19	15 Aug 2009	Mississippi Coast Coliseum, Biloxi, Mississippi, US	Retained WBO NABO cruiserweight title
24	Win	23–0–1	Jose Luis Herrera	UD	10	21 Mar 2009	Pensacola Civic Center, Pensacola, Florida, US	Won vacant WBO NABO cruiserweight title
23	Win	22–0–1	Matt Hicks	TKO	3 (6), 2:50	23 Jan 2009	Plaza Hotel & Casino, Las Vegas, Nevada, US	
22	Win	21–0–1	Darnell Wilson	UD	12	8 Feb 2008	Dover Downs, Dover, Delaware, US	Won IBF USBA cruiserweight title
21	Win	20–0–1	Andy Sample	TKO	2 (8), 2:18	13 Oct 2007	Abou Ben Adhem Shrine Mosque, Springfield, Missouri, US	
20	Win	19–0–1	Patrick Nwamu	UD	12	2 Mar 2007	Qwest Arena, Boise, Idaho, US	Won IBA super cruiserweight title
19	Win	18–0–1	Chris Thomas	UD	12	19 Jan 2007	Knox Arena, Olive Branch, Mississippi, US	
18	Win	17–0–1	Gary Dydell	TKO	1 (6), 1:36	30 Sep 2006	Edinburg Stadium, Edinburg, Texas, US	
17	Win	16–0–1	Ali Supreme	TKO	1 (12), 2:24	13 May 2006	Arizona Veterans Memorial Coliseum, Phoenix, Arizona, US	Won vacant WBF All-Americas cruiserweight title
16	Win	15–0–1	Jermell Barnes	UD	8	28 Jan 2006	Boardwalk Hall, Atlantic City, New Jersey, US	
15	Win	14–0–1	James Johnson	TKO	5 (8), 3:00	11 Nov 2005	Abou Ben Adhem Shrine Mosque, Springfield, Missouri, US	
14	Win	13–0–1	Nate Zeikle	KO	2 (6), 0:34	20 Aug 2005	Allstate Arena, Rosemont, Illinois, US	
13	Win	12–0–1	Frank Walker	UD	8	15 Jul 2005	Pechanga Resort and Casino, Temecula, California, US	
12	Win	11–0–1	Cliff Nellon	TKO	4 (6)	26 Mar 2005	American Bank Center, Corpus Christi, Texas, US	
11	Win	10–0–1	Thomas Cameron	UD	6	3 Dec 2004	Ballys Park Place Hotel Casino, Atlantic City, New Jersey, US	
10	Win	9–0–1	Cruz Quintana	TKO	1 (6), 2:11	25 Sep 2004	Shrine Mosque, Springfield, Missouri, US	
9	Win	8–0–1	John Turlington	TKO	4 (?)	17 Jul 2004	Reliant Center, Houston, Texas, US	
8	Win	7–0–1	Brian Maclin	KO	1 (6)	8 May 2004	Casino Del Sol, Tucson, Arizona, US	
7	Win	6–0–1	Eric French	UD	4	27 Mar 2004	Alltell Arena, Little Rock, Arkansas, US	
6	Win	5–0–1	Chris Hairston	TKO	1 (4), 3:00	24 Jan 2004	Boardwalk Hall, Atlantic City, New Jersey, US	
5	Draw	4–0–1	Semisi Bloomfield	PTS	4	22 Nov 2003	Reliant Park, Houston, Texas, US	
4	Win	4–0	Gabriel Taylor	TKO	2 (4), 2:59	3 Oct 2003	Reliant Park, Houston, Texas, US	
3	Win	3–0	Caesar Carbajal	TKO	1 (4)	26 July 2003	Olympic Auditorium, Los Angeles, California, US	
2	Win	2–0	Jim Franklin	UD	4	17 May 2003	Trump Taj Mahal, Atlantic City, New Jersey, US	
1	Win	1–0	Dallas Lane	TKO	1 (4), 1:04	3 May 2003	Flamingo Hilton, Las Vegas, Nevada, US	

Preceded by Michael Bennett	United States Amateur Heavyweight Champion; 2001-2002	Succeeded by Devin Vargas
