= Siarhei Liakhovich =

Belarusian boxer (born 1976)

Siarhei Liakhovich Сяргей Ляховіч
Personal information
- Nickname: White Wolf
- Nationality: Belarusian
- Born: Siarhei Petrovich Liakhovich; 29 May 1976 (age 50) Vitebsk, Byelorussian SSR, Soviet Union (now Belarus)
- Height: 1.93 m (6 ft 4 in)
- Weight: Heavyweight

Boxing career
- Reach: 189 cm (74.5 in)
- Stance: Orthodox

Boxing record
- Total fights: 36
- Wins: 27
- Win by KO: 17
- Losses: 9
Medal record
Men's amateur boxing
Representing Belarus
World Championships
Bronze medal – third place	Budapest 1997	Super-heavyweight

Siarhei Piatrovich Liakhovich (Belarusian: Ляховіч Сяргей Пятровіч; born 29 May 1976) is a Belarusian former professional boxer who competed from 1998 to 2020. He held the World Boxing Organization (WBO) heavyweight title in 2006. At regional level, he held the Belarus heavyweight title from 1998 to 2001. As an amateur, he won a bronze medal at the 1997 World Championships.

== Amateur career ==
Liakhovich was born in Vitebsk, in the former Byelorussian Soviet Socialist Republic (now Belarus), and represented Belarus at the 1996 Olympic Games. He was a long-time amateur who won a bronze medal at the 1997 World Championships. He amassed a 145–15 record before turning pro in 1998.

== Professional career ==
His first defeat occurred on June 1, 2002, when he was knocked out by Maurice Harris in the 9th round.

Liakhovich won the WBO title from Lamon Brewster on April 1, 2006. Liakhovich was knocked down in the 7th round, but went on to win on points via unanimous decision. He lost the title to former Lineal heavyweight champion Shannon Briggs by technical knockout in the 12th round on November 4, 2006, after being knocked down twice.

On February 16, 2008, Liakhovich lost to Nikolai Valuev by unanimous decision following a one-sided contest. He won his next two fights a first-round TKO of Jeremy Bates on November 7, 2009 in Nuremberg, Germany and a 9th-round KO of Evans Quinn in Mecklenburg-Vorpommern, Germany on May 22, 2010 on the undercard of Chagaev-Meehan.

On August 9, 2013, Liakhovich fought American heavyweight Deontay Wilder. Wilder won the fight with a first-round knockout.

In February 2014, Liakhovich achieved his first win in four years with a unanimous decision over journeyman Chad Davis.

He faced Simon Kean for the vacant WBC International Silver heavyweight title at the Bell Centre in Montreal, Canada, on 7 December 2019, losing by stoppage in the final round.

== Professional boxing record ==
36 fights	27 wins	9 losses
By knockout	17	7
By decision	10	2

No.	Result	Record	Opponent	Type	Round, time	Date	Location	Notes
36	Loss	27–9	Evgenyi Romanov	KO	2 (10), 1:48	7 Nov 2020	RCC Boxing Academy, Ekaterinburg, Russia	For WBO Global heavyweight title
35	Loss	27–8	Simon Kean	TKO	10 (10), 2:04	7 Dec 2019	Bell Centre, Montreal, Canada	For vacant WBC Silver International heavyweight title
34	Win	27–7	Ramon Olivas	TKO	3 (6), 2:30	13 Nov 2017	Arena ITSON, Ciudad Obregón, Mexico	
33	Loss	26–7	Andy Ruiz Jr.	UD	10	20 Dec 2014	Celebrity Theatre, Phoenix, Arizona, US	For WBC-NABF and WBO Inter-Continental heavyweight titles
32	Win	26–6	Chad Davis	UD	8	22 Feb 2014	Celebrity Theatre, Phoenix, Arizona, US	
31	Loss	25–6	Deontay Wilder	KO	1 (10), 1:43	9 Aug 2013	Fantasy Springs Resort Casino, Indio, California, US	For WBC Continental Americas heavyweight title
30	Loss	25–5	Bryant Jennings	RTD	9 (10), 3:00	24 Mar 2012	Aviator Sports and Events Center, New York City, New York, US	
29	Loss	25–4	Robert Helenius	TKO	9 (12), 0:19	27 Aug 2011	Messe, Erfurt, Germany	For WBA Inter-Continental and WBO Inter-Continental heavyweight titles
28	Win	25–3	Evans Quinn	KO	9 (10), 0:48	22 May 2010	StadtHalle, Rostock, Germany	
27	Win	24–3	Jeremy Bates	TKO	1 (8), 2:11	7 Nov 2009	Nuremberg Arena, Nuremberg, Germany	
26	Loss	23–3	Nikolai Valuev	UD	12	16 Feb 2008	Nuremberg Arena, Nuremberg, Germany	
25	Loss	23–2	Shannon Briggs	TKO	12 (12), 2:59	4 Nov 2006	Chase Field, Phoenix, Arizona, US	Lost WBO heavyweight title
24	Win	23–1	Lamon Brewster	UD	12	1 Apr 2006	Wolstein Center, Cleveland, Ohio, US	Won WBO heavyweight title
23	Win	22–1	Dominick Guinn	UD	10	3 Dec 2004	Bally's, Atlantic City, New Jersey, US	
22	Win	21–1	Onebo Maxime	UD	6	27 Mar 2004	Alltel Arena, Little Rock, Arkansas, US	
21	Win	20–1	Ron Guerrero	TKO	1 (8)	9 Jan 2004	Mohegan Sun Arena, Montville, Connecticut, US	
20	Win	19–1	James Walton	TKO	8 (10), 2:07	27 Sep 2003	HSBC Arena, Buffalo, New York, US	
19	Win	18–1	Sione Asipeli	TKO	5 (10)	17 May 2003	Petersen Events Center, Pittsburgh, Pennsylvania, US	
18	Win	17–1	Joe Lenhart	TKO	9 (10)	4 Jan 2003	D.C. Armory, Washington, D.C., US	
17	Loss	16–1	Maurice Harris	KO	9 (10), 1:31	1 Jun 2002	Boardwalk Hall, Atlantic City, New Jersey, US	
16	Win	16–0	Friday Ahunanya	UD	12	17 Nov 2001	Mandalay Bay Events Center, Paradise, Nevada, US	Won WBA–NABA heavyweight title
15	Win	15–0	Ed White	TKO	1	16 Jun 2001	Cintas Center, Cincinnati, Ohio, US	
14	Win	14–0	Sedreck Fields	UD	8	14 Apr 2001	Madison Square Garden, New York City, New York, US	
13	Win	13–0	Derrell Dixon	MD	6	2 Dec 2000	Mandalay Bay Events Center, Paradise, Nevada, US	
12	Win	12–0	Bradley Rone	UD	8	29 Aug 2000	Sheraton Waikiki Hotel, Honolulu, Hawaii, US	
11	Win	11–0	Tracy Wilson	TKO	1 (4), 1:19	12 Aug 2000	Paris Las Vegas, Paradise, Nevada, US	
10	Win	10–0	Anthony Curry	KO	1 (6), 1:55	29 Jul 2000	Veterans Memorial Coliseum, Phoenix, Arizona, US	
9	Win	9–0	Everett Martin	UD	8	28 Mar 2000	Prince Hotel, Honolulu, Hawaii, US	
8	Win	8–0	Tracy Wilson	TKO	2 (4), 2:16	29 Feb 2000	Plaza Hotel & Casino, Las Vegas, Nevada, US	
7	Win	7–0	Donald Macon	TKO	2 (4), 1:42	18 Dec 1999	Grand Casino, Tunica, Mississippi, US	
6	Win	6–0	Marshall Tillman	KO	4 (4), 0:11	7 Dec 1999	New Orleans, Louisiana, US	
5	Win	5–0	Larry Wilson	TKO	1 (4), 1:22	4 Dec 1999	The Great Alaskan Bush Company Tent, Phoenix, Arizona, US	
4	Win	4–0	Isaac Poole	TKO	2 (4), 2:25	27 Aug 1999	Jai-Alai Fronton, Miami, Florida, US	
3	Win	3–0	Sergey Tretyakov	TKO	4 (4)	17 Mar 1999	Casino Conti Giant Hall, Saint Petersburg, Russia	
2	Win	2–0	Alexander Vasiliev	UD	6	30 Jan 1999	Barysaw, Belarus	
1	Win	1–0	Ihar Sharapau	KO	1 (10), 2:12	25 Dec 1998	Club Aquarium, Minsk, Belarus	Won vacant Belarus heavyweight title

Sporting positions
Regional boxing titles
New title	Belarus heavyweight champion 25 December 1998 – 2001; Vacated	Vacant Title next held by Vitali Shkraba
Preceded by Friday Ahunanya	WBA–NABA heavyweight champion 17 November 2001 – June 2002; Vacated	Vacant Title next held by Lance Whitaker
World boxing titles
Preceded by Lamon Brewster	WBO heavyweight champion 1 April 2006 – 4 November 2006	Succeeded by Shannon Briggs
