= Lamon Brewster =

American boxer

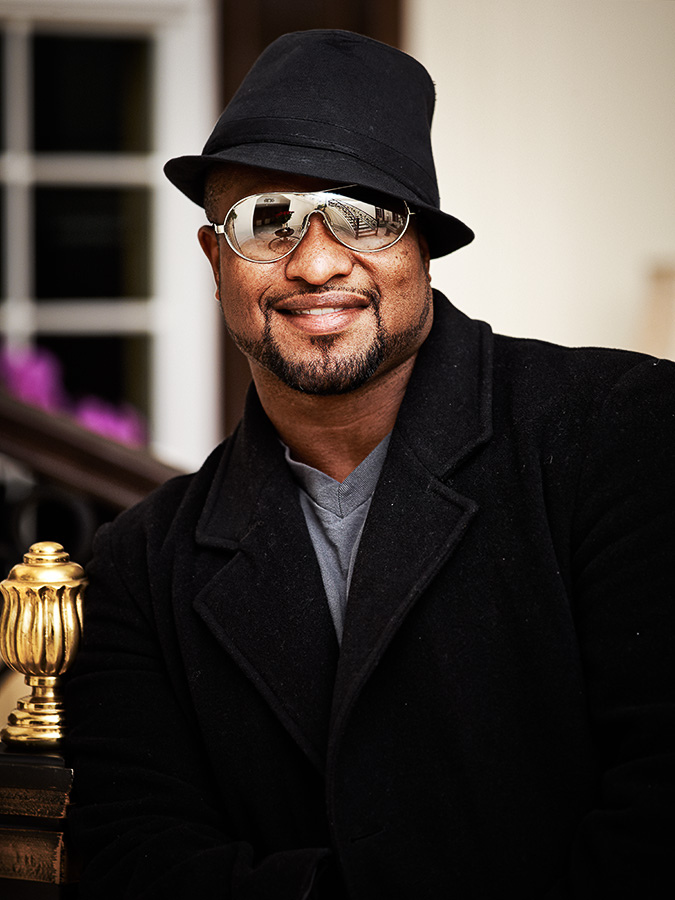
- Brewster in 2011

Personal information
- Nickname: Relentless
- Born: Lamon Tajuan Brewster; June 5, 1973 (age 53) Indianapolis, Indiana, U.S.
- Height: 6 ft 2 in (188 cm)
- Weight: Heavyweight

Boxing career
- Reach: 77 in (196 cm)
- Stance: Orthodox

Boxing record
- Total fights: 41
- Wins: 35
- Win by KO: 30
- Losses: 6
Medal record
Men's amateur boxing
Representing United States
Pan American Games
Silver medal – second place	1995 Mar del Plata	Heavyweight

Lamon Tajuan Brewster (born June 5, 1973) is an American former professional boxer who competed from 1996 to 2010. He held the World Boxing Organization (WBO) heavyweight title from 2004 to 2006, and is best known for scoring an upset knockout victory over Wladimir Klitschko to win the vacant title. Brewster was ranked by BoxRec as the world's eighth best active heavyweight at the conclusion of 2004.

As an amateur, he won the U.S. national championships in 1995, and a silver medal at that year's Pan American Games, both in the heavyweight division. Following his retirement from the sport in 2011, Brewster became an entrepreneur and founded a consulting business.

== Amateur career ==
Brewster won the 1995 U.S. national amateur championship as a heavyweight. Additional highlights include:

- 1995 2nd place at the Pan American Games in Mar del Plata, Argentina. Results were:
  - Defeated Moises Rolon (Puerto Rico) PTS
  - Lost to Félix Savón (Cuba) RSCH-2
- Brewster failed to qualify for the 1996 Atlanta Olympics after he lost to Nate Jones and DaVarryl Williamson in the trials.

== Professional career ==
=== 1996–2003: Prospect to contender ===
Brewster turned professional in 1996 and was undefeated for his first three years as a pro until losing decisions to Clifford Etienne and Charles Shufford in 2000.

=== 2004–2005: WBO heavyweight champion and title defenses ===
On April 10, 2004, Brewster faced Wladimir Klitschko in a fight for the vacant World Boxing Organization championship that had been vacated by Corrie Sanders, who had upset Klitschko by knocking him out in the second round of their fight in 2003, when he decided to challenge Vitali Klitschko for the World Boxing Council title vacated when Lennox Lewis retired.

Brewster was dominated in the early going, knocked down once in the fourth round. In the fifth round, Brewster hurt Klitschko with a left hook that forced the Ukrainian fighter to use the ropes to hold himself up, which resulted in a knockdown. As the round ended, Brewster hit Klitschko with a combination of punches that caused him to go down after the bell sounded. Seeing Klitschko struggle to return to his feet, referee Robert Byrd stopped the fight and awarded a technical knockout victory to Brewster. Klitschko claimed foul play resulted in his defeat but an investigation found nothing.

For eleven years, Brewster remained the last boxer to defeat Klitschko in the ring, until Tyson Fury defeated Klitschko in a 2015 heavyweight fight. Brewster remains the second last boxer to knock Klitschko out in a bout, preceding Anthony Joshua, who won by TKO on the 11th round defeating Wladimir Klitschko on 30 April 2017.

=== 2006–2007: Brewster vs. Liakhovich and Klitschko II ===
Brewster lost his WBO title by unanimous decision on April 1, 2006, to Sergei Liakhovich from Belarus in an action-packed fight. In an interview following the fight, Brewster said that he could not see with his left eye after the first round. It was later confirmed that he had suffered a detached retina in his left eye and he had to undergo surgery.

Lamon Brewster returned to the ring on July 7, 2007, losing his rematch against Wladimir Klitschko after trainer Buddy McGirt stopped the fight after the sixth round. The fight took place in Köln (Cologne), Germany, for the IBF & IBO heavyweight title.

=== 2008–2010: Tail end of career ===
After two tune-up bouts, he was upset by Gbenga Oloukun by an eight-round points decision. The following year he was stopped by rising contender Robert Helenius. At one point in his career, Brewster was managed by The Simpsons co-creator, professional poker player and philanthropist, Sam Simon. Later Brewster left Simon and signed with manager Al Haymon.

=== Retirement ===
On January 9, 2011, Lamon Brewster officially announced his retirement as a professional boxer. Brewster cited an eye injury from his last fight with Helenius as the reason for this retirement. Further, he indicated that he believes that Helenius tampered with his gloves which caused the resulting injury to Brewster. He underwent four unsuccessful surgeries to restore sight in his left eye. After further surgery, his vision began to improve.

== Personal life ==
In 1995 he was divorced from actress Tichina Arnold (of Martin and Everybody Hates Chris fame).

Brewster also has one older daughter from a previous relationship. Brewster married his current wife "Juana" Brewster in October 2000, and together they have two daughters and a son.

He is also the cousin of former IBF and WBO heavyweight champion Chris Byrd. Brewster has made several television appearances as well as public service announcements through his career.

=== Entrepreneurship ===
Brewster founded "Fighting Connection Consulting" in July 2011 providing expertise to professional fighters on training methods, psychology, nutrition, conditioning, team building, and publicity.

== Professional boxing record ==
41 fights	35 wins	6 losses
By knockout	30	2
By decision	5	4

No.	Result	Record	Opponent	Type	Round, time	Date	Location	Notes
41	Loss	35–6	Robert Helenius	TKO	8 (10), 2:31	Jan 30, 2010	Jahnsportforum, Neubrandenburg, Germany	
40	Loss	35–5	Gbenga Oloukun	UD	8	Aug 29, 2009	Gerry Weber Stadion, Halle, Germany	
39	Win	35–4	Michael Sprott	UD	8	Mar 14, 2009	Ostseehalle, Kiel, Germany	
38	Win	34–4	Danny Batchelder	KO	5 (12), 1:10	Aug 30, 2008	Gardens, Cincinnati, Ohio, U.S.	Won vacant NABA heavyweight title
37	Loss	33–4	Wladimir Klitschko	RTD	6 (12), 3:00	Jul 7, 2007	Kölnarena, Cologne, Germany	For IBF and IBO heavyweight titles
36	Loss	33–3	Siarhei Liakhovich	UD	12	Apr 1, 2006	Wolstein Center, Cleveland, Ohio, U.S.	Lost WBO heavyweight title
35	Win	33–2	Luan Krasniqi	TKO	9 (12), 2:48	Sep 28, 2005	Color Line Arena, Hamburg, Germany	Retained WBO heavyweight title
34	Win	32–2	Andrew Golota	TKO	1 (12), 0:52	May 21, 2005	United Center, Chicago, Illinois, U.S.	Retained WBO heavyweight title
33	Win	31–2	Kali Meehan	SD	12	Sep 4, 2004	Mandalay Bay Events Center, Paradise, Nevada, U.S.	Retained WBO heavyweight title
32	Win	30–2	Wladimir Klitschko	TKO	5 (12), 3:00	Apr 10, 2004	Mandalay Bay Events Center, Paradise, Nevada, U.S.	Won vacant WBO heavyweight title
31	Win	29–2	Joe Lenhart	TKO	3 (10), 3:00	Mar 1, 2003	Thomas & Mack Center, Paradise, Nevada, U.S.	
30	Win	28–2	Tommy Martin	TKO	3 (12), 2:03	Dec 14, 2002	Boardwalk Hall, Atlantic City, New Jersey, U.S.	Retained NABO heavyweight title; Won vacant WBC Continental Americas heavyweight title
29	Win	27–2	Willie Chapman	TKO	6 (10), 1:32	Jul 27, 2002	Mandalay Bay Events Center, Paradise, Nevada, U.S.	
28	Win	26–2	Nate Jones	TKO	3 (12), 1:10	Feb 2, 2002	Sovereign Center, Reading, Pennsylvania, U.S.	Won vacant NABO heavyweight title
27	Win	25–2	Joey Guy	TKO	1 (10), 1:44	Oct 25, 2001	Hollywood Park Casino, Inglewood, California, U.S.	
26	Loss	24–2	Charles Shufford	UD	10	Oct 21, 2000	Cobo Hall, Detroit, Michigan, U.S.	
25	Win	24–1	Val Smith	TKO	1 (8), 2:02	Sep 24, 2000	Silver Smith Casino, West Wendover, Nevada, U.S.	
24	Loss	23–1	Clifford Etienne	UD	10	May 6, 2000	Mellon Arena, Pittsburgh, Pennsylvania, U.S.	
23	Win	23–0	Richard Mason	UD	10	Feb 26, 2000	Madison Square Garden, New York City, New York, U.S.	
22	Win	22–0	Quinn Navarre	KO	1 (10), 2:12	Sep 17, 1999	All American Sports Park, Las Vegas, Nevada, U.S.	
21	Win	21–0	Mario Cawley	KO	2 (8), 1:20	May 22, 1999	Mandalay Bay Events Center, Paradise, Nevada, U.S.	
20	Win	20–0	Marcus Rhode	TKO	1 (8), 2:06	Oct 3, 1998	Las Vegas Hilton, Winchester, Nevada, U.S.	
19	Win	19–0	Everett Martin	TKO	4	Aug 15, 1998	Grand Olympic Auditorium, Los Angeles, California, U.S.	
18	Win	18–0	Louis Monaco	KO	2 (8), 3:00	Jun 14, 1998	Etess Arena, Atlantic City, New Jersey, U.S.	
17	Win	17–0	Garing Lane	UD	10	May 16, 1998	Bank of America Centre, Boise, Idaho, U.S.	
16	Win	16–0	Marselles Brown	KO	4	Mar 23, 1998	Foxwoods Resort Casino, Ledyard, Connecticut, U.S.	
15	Win	15–0	Artis Pendergrass	TKO	1 (6), 2:11	Feb 28, 1998	Bally's Park Place, Atlantic City, New Jersey, U.S.	
14	Win	14–0	Biko Botowamungu	TKO	5 (8), 0:20	Jan 9, 1998	Grand Casino, Biloxi, Mississippi, U.S.	
13	Win	13–0	Tony LaRosa	TKO	1 (10)	Dec 20, 1997	Spotlight 29 Casino, Coachella, California, U.S.	
12	Win	12–0	John Kiser	UD	8	Nov 20, 1997	Grand Olympic Auditorium, Los Angeles, California, U.S.	
11	Win	11–0	Aaron Conway	TKO	1 (6), 2:24	Aug 8, 1997	The Orleans, Paradise, Nevada, U.S.	
10	Win	10–0	Cleveland Woods	RTD	2 (8), 3:00	Jul 11, 1997	Tropicana Las Vegas, Paradise, Nevada, U.S.	
9	Win	9–0	Willie Johnson	TKO	2	Apr 8, 1997	Grand Casino, Biloxi, Mississippi, U.S.	
8	Win	8–0	Mark Johnson	KO	1 (6), 2:03	Mar 6, 1997	Convention Hall, Asbury Park, New Jersey, U.S.	
7	Win	7–0	Tim Knight	KO	1	Feb 6, 1997	Los Angeles, California, U.S.	
6	Win	6–0	Trent Surratt	KO	1 (6), 1:52	Jan 31, 1997	Great Western Forum, Inglewood, California, U.S.	
5	Win	5–0	Ronnie Smith	TKO	3 (6), 0:30	Jan 9, 1997	Beverly Wilshire Hotel, Los Angeles, California, U.S.	
4	Win	4–0	Fabian Meza	KO	1 (4)	Dec 28, 1996	Irvine, California, U.S.	
3	Win	3–0	Greg McGhee	KO	2 (4), 2:28	Dec 17, 1996	National Guard Armory, Pikesville, Maryland, U.S.	
2	Win	2–0	Sean Fink	KO	1 (4)	Nov 29, 1996	Civic Center, Roanoke, Virginia, U.S.	
1	Win	1–0	Moses Harris	KO	1 (4), 1:21	Nov 8, 1996	Arizona Charlie's Decatur, Las Vegas, Nevada, U.S.	

== See also ==
- List of world heavyweight boxing champions
- List of WBO world champions

Sporting positions
Amateur boxing titles
Previous: Derrell Dixon	U.S. heavyweight champion 1995	Next: DaVarryl Williamson
Regional boxing titles
Vacant Title last held by Andre Purlette	NABO heavyweight champion February 2, 2002 – April 10, 2004; Won world title	Vacant Title next held by Lance Whitaker
Vacant Title last held by Jameel McCline	WBC Continental Americas heavyweight champion December 14, 2002 – March 2003; Vacated	Vacant Title next held by Saúl Montana
Vacant Title last held by Friday Ahunanya	NABA heavyweight champion August 30, 2008 – March 2009; Vacated	Vacant Title next held by David Rodriguez
World boxing titles
Vacant Title last held by Corrie Sanders	WBO heavyweight champion April 10, 2004 – April 1, 2006	Succeeded by Siarhei Liakhovich
