= Lamon Brewster vs. Siarhei Liakhovich =

- Date: April 1, 2006
- Venue: Wolstein Center, Cleveland, Ohio, U.S.
- Title(s) on the line: WBO Heavyweight Championship

Tale of the tape
Boxer	Lamon Brewster	Siarhei Liakhovich
Nickname	Relentless	The White Wolf
Hometown	Los Angeles, California, U.S.	Vitebsk, Belarus
Pre-fight record	33–2 (29 KO)	22–1 (14 KO)
Age	32 years, 9 months	29 years, 10 months
Height	6 ft 2 in (188 cm)	6 ft 4 in (193 cm)
Weight	232 lb (105 kg)	238 1/2 lb (108 kg)
Style	Orthodox	Orthodox
Recognition	WBO; Heavyweight Champion; The Ring; No. 4 Ranked Heavyweight	WBO; No. 13 Ranked Heavyweight

Result
- Liakhovich wins via 12-round unanimous decision (117–110, 115–113, 115–112)

Lamon Brewster vs. Siarhei Liakhovich, was a professional boxing match contested on 1 April 2006 for the WBO Heavyweight Championship.

== Background ==
Since his upset victory over Wladimir Klitschko, Lamon Brewster had made 3 defences of his WBO belt, stopping 2 of his challengers before signing to face the relatively unknown former Olympian Siarhei Liakhovich. Brewster underwent laser eye surgery in Los Angeles in the weeks before the fight, it was speculated that he continued with the bout in order to fulfill his contractual obligations to his promoter Don King, so he could move on. Liakhovich, born in Belarus but living in Scottsdale, Arizona, hadn't fought since December 2004 after injury prevented an appearance on a Showtime bill in late 2005.

== The fight ==
The fight was a slugfest with both fighters having the other in trouble. Liakhovich took a knee just before the end of round seven before he landed a left that staggered the champion in the 8th.

At the end of 12 rounds the scores were 115–113, 115–113 & 117–110 all for Liakhovich making him the new WBO Champion.

Liakhovich landed 50.3% of his punches according to CompuBox while Brewster landed 36.3%.

== Aftermath ==
“Liakhovich deserved to win,” Brewster said afterwards “He earned it. I take my hat off to him. He won and we have a rematch. I cannot wait to do it again.” However it was revealed that Brewster had suffered a detached retina in his left eye in the first round and therefore he could not see with his left eye afterwards. He had to undergo surgery, keeping him out of action for more than year.

Liakhovich made his first defence in November against former Lineal Heavyweight Champion Shannon Briggs, who stopped him in the final round.

== Undercard ==
Confirmed bouts:

== Broadcasting ==
Country	Broadcaster
United States	Showtime

Preceded by vs. Luan Krasniqi	Lamon Brewster' bouts 1 April 2006	Succeeded by vs. Wladimir Klitschko II
Preceded by vs. Dominick Guinn	Siarhei Liakhovich's bouts 1 April 2006	Succeeded by vs. Shannon Briggs
