= Nick Webb (boxer) =

British boxer (born 1987)

Personal information
- Nicknames: Wild; Wild Webb the Lion
- Born: Nicholas John Webb; 23 September 1987 (age 39) Chertsey, Surrey, England
- Height: 6 ft 5 in (196 cm)
- Weight: Heavyweight

Boxing career
- Reach: 78 in (198 cm)
- Stance: Orthodox

Boxing record
- Total fights: 23
- Wins: 19
- Win by KO: 15
- Losses: 4
Medal record
Men's amateur boxing
Representing England
English National Championships
Silver medal – second place	2013 Houghton-le-Spring	Super-heavyweight
Bronze medal – third place	2014 Liverpool	Super-heavyweight

Nick John Webb (born 23 September 1987) is a British professional boxer.

== Early life ==
Nicholas John Webb was born on 23 September 1987 and grew up in a council house in Chertsey, Surrey, England, the eldest child raised by a single mother Wendy. He was born to an English mother and a Jamaican father, making him mixed-race, and has one brother, George, and one sister, Siobhan. Webb grew up in working class surroundings, and as a consequence of a fatherless household, Webb took on the role of 'the man of the house' from an early age. He spoke of such a single parent household having had a large impact in his youth, whilst describing it as the worst thing he experienced as a child: "I think not having a dad, just growing up, I sort of depended on myself always [...]". His grandfather was a bare-knuckle boxer, and was one of Webb's inspirations for joining Woking Amateur Boxing Club: "He was a boxer, he used to tell me his stories and then when he passed away after a few month or weeks I went down to my local boxing gym."

He attended Salesian School and Brooklands College in Surrey, respectively, and spoke of suffering racism at the hands of bullies as a student. From the age of thirteen, he threw the shot put and discus for Newham and Essex Beagles AC, and also played basketball and rugby. When Webb was growing up he enjoyed watching boxing, and spoke of admiring Muhammad Ali, Lennox Lewis, Floyd Mayweather Jr., and David Haye.

== Amateur career ==
Webb competed for Woking Amateur Boxing Club in a number of tournaments, and as such had reached the Under 10's Novice ABAs finals within a few fights, whilst securing the gold medal in 2012. He won the 2012 National Novices for under 20 bouts in Chicago, after which he had claimed a silver medal at the National Novices for under 20 bouts in 2013, losing to Alex Dickinson in the final. He held an amateur record of 27–5, of which 18 were via knockout, including a stoppage of DL Jones. Of his five losses, Webb stated that three of them were to Joe Joyce: "He's the best I fought; doesn't hit especially hard but throws so many. He's extremely fit and can ship tremendous punishment."

He lost to Joe Joyce (Enfield ABC) via a points-decision 38:25 in the preliminaries of the 2012 English National Championships in Feltham, London. He followed up his defeat by Joyce with a second placing at the 2013 English National Championships at the Rainton Meadows Arena in Houghton-le-Spring by progressing through the quarter-finals by way of walkover and followed by outpointing Osamuede Omoregie in semi-finals. Webb then advanced to the finals, though was narrowly outpointed by Anthony Richardson 3:2. Richardson forged into the lead in the first two rounds, but Webb closed the distance wherein Richardson was sent stumbling into the ropes and down for a count by a right-hand. The final bell came at exactly as Richardson was trapped in a corner for a standing eight count, and three of the five judges voted in Richardson's favour as the bout went to the scoresheets. At the 2013 Haringey Box Cup in Haringey, London, Webb was defeated by Niall Kennedy (Ireland) 3:2. His first major event of 2014 was a return to the English National Championships in Liverpool, England, where he stopped Ben Roberts, though his campaign ended in the semi-finals where he was stopped by Joe Joyce.

== Professional career ==
=== Early career ===
After winning his bronze medal, Webb spoke of his ambition to secure a place on the GB Boxing squad to eventually partake in the 2012 London Olympics, however, after three trials and his loss to Joyce at the English National Championships he decided to turn professional. After meeting with several fight promoters, he signed a contract to fight for Frank Warren's Queensberry Promotions. Prior to turning professional, Webb also partnered with manager and mentor, former world heavyweight title challenger, Scott Welch. Of the acquisition of Webb to his team, Welsh stated: "I've been around heavyweights like Frank Bruno but [Webb]'s definitely would of the strongest [...] But boxing's not just about strength. [Webb]'s already got a good jab, good reach and good boxing brain but technically, [Webb]'s still a work in progress. Before I started working with him he was pretty much self-taught." Additionally, Welsh stated that Webb had developed an amateur style akin to "hitting bags alongside dozens of other kids [...]", and that he'd had very little one-to-one tuition. On 25 March 2015, Webb made his professional debut at York Hall as part of the undercard to Ovill McKenzie vs. Matty Askin, defeating Hrvoje Kišiček (10–15–0) with a first-round knockout. After knocking out Kišiček, Webb explained his intention of looking to put on a good start for the people watching him, in which he stated: "I just let me hands go and I could see him going so I finished the job. It was a great start, the first fight is out of the way and now I can settle down continue learning." He then had six more fights in the space of twelve-months, defeating Martin Szatmári (2–1–1), Ferenc Zsalek (15–46–6), Angel Angelov (2–2–0), and Zoltán Csala (9–5–0) all via first-round knockout.

After his encounter with Zsalek, Webb decided to split from Queensberry Promotions, due to contract disagreements, however, he mentioned Sauerland Promotion as a potential future partnership. On 21 May 2016, Webb fought Hari Miles (9–0–0) and was awarded a points decision of 40–37 by referee Bob Williams. Webb was taken the distance for the first time in his career, and although it was a completely one-sided bout, Miles landed plenty of clean, heavy shots which Webb took well. Webb outworked Miles throughout the contest and came close to finishing his foe in the second half, though Miles managed to survive the shots that came his way, whilst spoiling Webb's work whenever possible. On 16 July, Webb fought No. 2 ranked heavyweight in the Czech Republic, Tomáš Mrázek (10–55–6), and knocked him out in the third round. In the first round, Webb dropped Mrázek with a left hook, though it wasn't counted as referee Kieran McCann believed it to have been a slip. Following the exchange, Webb dropped him again with a left hook to the body; and then in the second round, before referee McCann stopped it in the third when Webb dropped him with an uppercut and a body shot. Speaking after the fight, Webb stated, "It was a good fight [...] I'm a work-in-progress and still coming through [...] I've got the experience in and I don't think many up and coming fighters would fight someone like him."

On 11 September, it was announced that Webb would box in a six-round contest live on Spike UK, as part of the undercard to George Groves vs. Eduard Gutknecht at The SSE Arena, Wembley 18 November. Of the encounter, Webb stated that "I've had a great and explosive year so far and fought on some big shows, gaining a lot of experience. I can't wait for this show on November 18 [...] and this is another opportunity to showcase my ferocious power in front of a big audience [...]". On 21 October, Webb secured another first-round knockout by defeating Jakov Gospić (17–15–0) at Tolworth Recreation Centre in Tolworth. In round one, Webb signalled his intention by landing a left hook to the body and a right to the head just seconds into the round, with Gospić going into full retreat from then. Webb battered Gospić around the ring trapping him on the ropes and working him over with heavy rights and left, which eventually lead to a head-jerking uppercut wherein referee John McGuire stopped the fight. After defeating Mrázek, Webb shared his main goal of achieving a 10–0 record by the end of this year, a Southern Area title fight, whilst expanding: "Hopefully, keep winning and then the English title this time next year." On 18 November, Webb secured the second-round referee technical decision of Croatian Ivica Perković.

On 21 January 2017, Webb returned to the ring at the Preston Guild Hall in Preston, Lancashire to face Chris Healey (6–2–0), wherein Webb won by stoppage in the third round when referee John Latham stopped the contest. At the weigh-in, Webb, 29 at the time of the fight, weighed in at 262 and one-quarter pounds, the heaviest to date of his professional career; Healey, 28, came in lighter at 251 pounds. On 17 February, Cyclone Promotions announced that Webb would face Dorian Darch in an eight-round contest at the Motorpoint Arena Cardiff on 11 March, as part of the undercard for Craig Kennedy's vacant British cruiserweight title fight with Matty Askin. However, on 24 March, Webb faced and defeated the German Andre Bunga in a six-round to secure a 60–54 points-decision from referee Victor Loughlin, and had knocked Bunga down once in the last round.

On 17 May, the British Boxing Board of Control revealed that following the opening of purse bids on 10 May, the winning bid was submitted by promoter Frank Warren for the vacant English heavyweight title between Webb and Nathan Gorman (9–0–0). On 27 July, Boxing Scene reported that the English title fight would take place on a card headlined by Josh Warrington and featuring the British super-lightweight title clash between champion Tyrone Nurse and Jack Catterall. On 3 October, it was reported that Webb would face Gorman in Newcastle on 11 November. HoweHowevon 30 October, it was confirmed that Gorman had withdrawn from the fight, instead facing Mohamed Soltby on the undercard of Liam Smith's rematch with Liam Williams on 11 November.

On 9 November, the British Boxing Board of Control ordered a fight between unbeaten Daniel Dubois (5–0–0) and Webb for the vacant English heavyweight title. A purse bid for the fight took place on 13 December, with the Dubois and Webb encounter having to take place by the end of May 2018. However, Webb revealed that Dubois pulled out on the day before the deadline, on 12 December.

==== Webb vs. Allen ====
On 26 January 2018, it was announced that Webb was added to the 'British Beef' card at The O2 Arena, as part of the undercard to Lawrence Okolie's cruiserweight grudge match against Isaac Chamberlain on 3 February. Prior to his encounter with Verunica, Webb had stated his intention of fighting Daniel Dubois, Nathan Gorman or British champion Sam Sexton, whilst remarking that to fight for the Lonsdale Belt would be a dream. Webb stretched his perfect record to twelve wins with a second-round stoppage over Ante Verunica, with Webb taking advantage of the carelessness of his rival to connect a right-hand to Verunica's chin, after which he was counted out by referee Robert Williams. On 17 July, Eddie Hearn had announced that he was planning on setting up a Commonwealth heavyweight title fight between champion Joe Joyce and Webb for 28 July, on the undercard of Dillian Whyte's clash against Joseph Parker at The O2 Arena. Joyce later released a statement affirming that he won't fight until he replaces his former trainer, Ismael Salas, who moved to Doha into semi-retirement. However, Joyce stated that he's ready to accept any advances from promoter Hearn to face Webb on the Anthony Joshua vs. Alexander Povetkin undercard on 22 September.

On 23 July, Webb was scheduled to take on heavyweight contender David Allen (13–4–2) on 28 July at The O2 Arena in an eliminator for Hughie Fury's British heavyweight title. Prior to the announcement on 23 July, contracts were signed and sent for Webb to face undefeated heavyweight contender Joe Joyce, Commonwealth heavyweight champion, however, Joyce had exited the fight. Although the fight was made at short notice, Webb stated that he was always in the gym, and always ready to fight, wherein he stated: "I've been out of the ring for a while now and I'm promising a big performance on Saturday." It was later revealed that Webb vs. Allen had been rushed through and signed due to Brandon Cook cancelling his scheduled bout with Kell Brook. After the announcement, Webb had strenuously claimed that when the time comes, it'll be strictly business, to which he added: "I'm really excited about this weekend and doing the job. It's a great opportunity for me to progress towards the British title. I'm going to break him down and finish him."

At the weigh-in, Webb, 30 at the time of the fight, weighed in at 260 and a half pounds; Allen, 26, came in at 258 and one-quarter pounds. Opinions on the fight were mixed, although in general more pundits favoured Webb to secure the victory. Allen was pushing forward, though was absorbing a lot of punishment along the way. In the fourth round, however, there was a sudden turn of events as Allen landed a big right-hand that sent Webb stumbling backwards. Moments later, Allen threw a left-hook to the body when in close, followed up by an overhand-right that landed cleanly on Webb and sent him reeling through the ropes. Unable to get to his feet with just seconds remaining in the round, referee Bob Williams waived off the contest.

Additionally, Webb was three rounds up on the scorecards until the right hand to the temple landed in the final seconds of the fourth round. Since his defeat to Allen, in August 2018, Webb spoke of the aftermath of the encounter, wherein he remarked, "Obviously, I was gutted after the fight, but it is what it is, I just got caught hard in the temple and that's what happens in the heavyweight division, a hard lesson learned, I got too comfortable in there." He also explained that he had never been put down by a shot before, even in sparring, so it was a new experience, whilst promising he wouldn't allow it to occur again. Webb also revealed that he had a short notice of two weeks to prepare and face Allen, who was only announced as his opponent days before the event took place. Allen had already shown interest in a rematch down the line, and when asked if a rematch is in his thoughts, Webb replied: "I would love a rematch, definitely a rematch in the future would be great. I would want a decent camp so I can come in on weight."

==== Webb vs. Sokolowski ====
On 6 September 2018, it was revealed that Webb would return to the ring at the Bracknell Leisure Centre in Berkshire, England on 29 September to begin the first stage of his planned rebuilding process following his sole career defeat. On 29 September, Webb returned to action with a second-round knockout of Darch. Darch was hurt from the opening bell with heavy shots to the head, which led to Webb finishing him off in the second round with a left-hook to the body. After the fight, Webb explained his plan to fit in another two learning fights this year before stepping back up to title contention.

On 7 November, British Boxing News revealed that Webb would return to York Hall on 15 December in an eight-round fight with the premise that the bout would provide the rounds to get him back into title contention in early 2019. On 12 December, Kamil Sokołowski (5–14–2) was revealed as Webb's opponent, of which Webb stated "He's been in with lot of good guys and stopped prospects on their way up [...] He's a tough guy, he goes the distance normally. He stopped Naylor Ball, who's from same gym as me." Webb was knocked out by Sokołowski in the third round of their scheduled six-round bout. Webb was caught by a heavy left-hand during an exchange and stumbled back to his corner on unsteady legs. He survived the count from referee Jeff Hinds, but another left-hand from Sokołowski landed clean on his jaw and ended the fight conclusively.

=== Ultimate Boxxer ===
==== Webb vs. Healey, Whitaker ====
On 11 October 2019, the eight heavyweight fighters who would go head to head in Ultimate Boxxer 6 tournament on 13 December were confirmed, with the event taking place at Manchester's Altrincham Ice Dome and televised live on BT Sport 1, BoxNation and BT Sport YouTube. Webb was revealed as one of the eight, including Sean Turner, Mark Bennett, Jonathan Palata, Josh Sandland, Jay McFarlane, Kamil Sokołowski and Chris Healey. On 29 November, Webb drew to face Chris Healey (8–6–2), and had expressed his desire to avenge his loss to Sokołowski, however, Sokołowski refused to put too much stock in the past encounter.

On 13 December, Webb defeated his first opponent, former foe Chris Healey, via split decision. After three-rounds of boxing, two judges scored the bout 29–28 in favour of Webb while the third judge scored it 29–28 to Healey. Webb's second fight of the night came against Danny Whitaker, with Webb securing a stoppage victory with seconds remaining in the opening round. A right uppercut followed by a left hook dropped the hurt Whittaker, and as he tottered back to the ropes, which resulted in referee John Latham calling a halt to the contest.

==== Webb vs. Bennett ====
In the finale of the tournament, Webb defeated Mark Bennett via unanimous decision with all three judges scoring the bout 30–27 to Webb, who additionally received grand money prize and the Golden Robe. Commenting on the victory, Webb said: "It's been a tough tough year for me, my family, my fiancé, but this makes it all worthwhile. I'm lost for words. I've been through it all – to hell and back but to win the Golden Robe is amazing."

=== Webb vs. Pfeifer ===
On 16 March 2021, Sky Sports reported that Dillian Whyte had confirmed Erik Pfeifer (7–0–0) as his latest signing and that the German heavyweight will face Webb on the 'Rumble On The Rock' bill in Gibraltar, on the undercard of Whyte's rematch against WBC interim heavyweight champion Alexander Povetkin. The encounter took place at the Europa Point Sports Complex in Gibraltar, for the vacant IBO International heavyweight title. At the weigh-in, Webb, 33 at the time of the fight, weighed in at 262 pounds, the lightest since his second encounter with Chris Healey; Pfeifer, 34, came in lighter at 246 and one-quarter pounds. Webb defeated Pfeifer via second-round stoppage.

== Personal life ==
Webb is a qualified electrician, as well as a full-time fighter; and for a time worked as a personal trainer at Achieve Lifestyle. He used to live and train in Brighton during weekdays with manager Scott Welch and boxers such as Lloyd Ellett and Nick Jenman, and is very close to Chris Eubank Jr. and Grant Ely. He's a supporter of Chelsea F.C. and regards Muhammad Ali vs. Cleveland Williams (1966) as his favourite fight.

== Professional boxing record ==
23 fights	19 wins	4 losses
By knockout	15	4
By decision	4	0

No.	Result	Record	Opponent	Type	Round, time	Date	Location	Notes
23	Loss	19–4	Emanuel Odiase	KO	2 (10)	15 May 2026	SAP-Arena, Mannheim, Germany	For vacant IBF European heavyweight title
22	Win	19–3	Mirko Tintor	RTD	2 (8), 3:00	21 Mar 2026	TJ Sokol, Rakovník, Czech Republic	
21	Win	18–3	Courtney Bennett	TKO	8 (10), 0:44	18 Oct 2024	York Hall, London, England	Won vacant Southern Area heavyweight title
20	Loss	17–3	Fabio Wardley	TKO	1 (10), 2:30	7 Aug 2021	Matchroom Headquarters, Brentwood, England	For English heavyweight title
19	Win	17–2	Erik Pfeifer	TKO	2 (10), 1:51	27 Mar 2021	Europa Point Sports Complex, Gibraltar	Won vacant IBO International heavyweight title
18	Win	16–2	Mark Bennett	UD	3	13 Dec 2019	Altrincham Ice Dome, Manchester, England	Ultimate Boxxer VI: heavyweight final
17	Win	15–2	Danny Whitaker	TKO	1 (3), 2:59	13 Dec 2019	Altrincham Ice Dome, Manchester, England	Ultimate Boxxer VI: heavyweight semi-final
16	Win	14–2	Chris Healey	SD	3	13 Dec 2019	Altrincham Ice Dome, Manchester, England	Ultimate Boxxer VI: heavyweight quarter-final
15	Loss	13–2	Kamil Sokołowski	TKO	3 (6), 2:20	15 Dec 2018	York Hall, London, England	
14	Win	13–1	Dorian Darch	TKO	2 (6), 1:52	29 Sep 2018	Bracknell Leisure Centre, Berkshire, England	
13	Loss	12–1	David Allen	KO	4 (10), 2:59	28 Jul 2018	The O2 Arena, London, England	
12	Win	12–0	Ante Verunica	KO	2 (6), 2:45	3 Feb 2018	The O2 Arena, London, England	
11	Win	11–0	Andre Bunga	PTS	6	24 Mar 2017	Meadowbank Sports Centre, Edinburgh, Scotland	
10	Win	10–0	Chris Healey	TKO	3 (6), 0:31	21 Jan 2017	Preston Guild Hall, Preston, England	
9	Win	9–0	Ivica Perković	RTD	2 (4), 3:00	18 Nov 2016	Wembley Arena, London, England	
8	Win	8–0	Jakov Gospić	TKO	1 (6), 2:57	21 Oct 2016	Meadowbank Sports Centre, Edinburgh, Scotland	
7	Win	7–0	Tomáš Mrázek	TKO	3 (4), 1:46	16 Jul 2016	Tolworth Recreation Centre, London, England	
6	Win	6–0	Hari Miles	PTS	4	21 May 2016	The O2 Arena, London, England	
5	Win	5–0	Zoltán Csala	KO	1 (4), 1:19	26 Mar 2016	Wembley Arena, London, England	
4	Win	4–0	Angel Angelov	TKO	1 (4), 0:26	12 Feb 2016	Hilton Brighton Metropole, Brighton, England	
3	Win	3–0	Ferenc Zsalek	KO	1 (4), 1:19	2 Oct 2015	Hilton Brighton Metropole, Brighton, England	
2	Win	2–0	Martin Szatmári	KO	1 (4), 1:57	9 May 2015	Wembley Arena, London, England	
1	Win	1–0	Hrvoje Kišiček	TKO	1 (4), 0:56	27 Mar 2015	York Hall, London, England	
