= Johnny Fisher =

British professional boxer (born 1999)

Personal information
- Nickname: The Romford Bull
- Born: 27 February 1999 (age 27) Harold Wood, London, England
- Height: 6 ft 4 in (193cm)

Boxing career
- Weight class: Heavyweight
- Stance: Orthodox

Boxing record
- Total fights: 16
- Wins: 15
- Win by KO: 12
- Losses: 1

Johnny Fisher (born 27 February 1999) is a British professional boxer.

== Early life ==
Fisher played rugby for a number of years as well as boxing, he says the high level physical sport helped give him a good grounding for his boxing career. His father boxed at amateur level and his grandfather also boxed, but only casually. His siblings have also boxed too.

Fisher began boxing before his teens but paused to focus on rugby until his second year at university, when he resumed training and sparred with Joe Joyce in preparation for Joyce's fight against Daniel Dubois. He also gained experience sparring with Hughie Fury and future opponent David Allen, which he credited with honing his skills.

== Amateur career ==
Fisher had a brief amateur career of only 12 bouts, three ending in first round stoppages.

== Professional career ==
=== Early career ===
He made his professional debut on 20 February 2021 against Matt Gordon on the undercard for the David Avanesyan vs. Josh Kelly fight at the Wembley Arena in London. He won by technical knockout 2:29 into the first round, with his opponent being both counted and knocked down before the stoppage.

With a record of nine wins from nine fights including eight by stoppage, he won his first title, the vacant BBBofC Southern Area heavyweight championship, on the undercard of Anthony Joshua versus Robert Helenius at The O2 Arena in London, winning via technical knockout in the seventh round against Harry Armstrong.

Making his United States debut at The Cosmopolitan of Las Vegas, Chelsea Ballroom in Paradise, Nevada, on 3 February 2024, Fisher stopped Dmytro Bezus in the first round.

He followed this up by knocking out Alen Babić just 36 seconds into the first round of their fight at the Copper Box Arena in London on 6 July 2024.

==== Fisher vs. Allen ====
In his next bout, he faced David Allen on 21 December 2024, at Kingdom Arena in Riyadh, Saudi Arabia, as part of the undercard for the heavyweight world title rematch between Oleksandr Usyk and Tyson Fury. After a positive start to the fight, Fisher was knocked down for the first time in his career during the fifth round. However, he recovered to win via split decision, with two of the ringside judges scoring the fight 95–94 for Fisher while the third had it 96–93 in Allen's favour. The decision was met with loud boos in the stadium and several observers, including former cruiserweight world champion Johnny Nelson and ex-European title holder Spencer Oliver, felt Allen had done enough to win the bout, while Fisher's promotor Eddie Hearn said: “I think the best I could hope for when I got in the ring was a draw."

==== Fisher vs. Allen II ====
Fisher faced David Allen in a rematch at the Copper Box Arena in London, England, on 17 May 2025. He lost by stoppage in the fifth round to suffer his first defeat as a professional.

==== Fisher vs. Baláž ====
Fisher got back to winning ways in his next fight, stopping Ivan Baláž in the fourth round at Salle des Étoiles in Monte Carlo on 6 December 2025.

=== Zuffa Boxing ===
On 13 July 2026, it was announced that Fisher had signed with Zuffa Boxing and was scheduled to headline Zuffa Boxing 11 at Copper Box Arena in London on 26 September 2026. He fought Michael Pirotton over 10 rounds and won by majority decision with two of the ringside judges scoring the fight 98–92 and 96–95 respectively in his favour, while the third had it a 95–95 draw.

== Personal life ==
Fisher attended Marshalls Park School in Romford.

He has a 2:1 degree in history from the University of Exeter, where his dissertation was on the aerial bombing of Germany in 1944–45.

Fisher's father, John Fisher, is a social media personality under his nickname "Big John". He is known for his catchphrase "Bosh."

== Professional boxing record ==
16 fights	15 wins	1 loss
By knockout	12	1
By decision	3	0

No.	Result	Record	Opponent	Type	Round, time	Date	Location	Notes
16	Win	15–1	Michael Pirotton	MD	10	26 Sep 2026	Copper Box Arena, London, England	
15	Win	14–1	Ivan Baláž	TKO	4 (10), 1:19	6 Dec 2025	Salle des Etoiles, Monte Carlo, Monaco	
14	Loss	13–1	David Allen	TKO	5 (10), 3:00	17 May 2025	Copper Box Arena, London, England	Lost WBA Inter-Continental heavyweight title
13	Win	13–0	David Allen	SD	10	21 Dec 2024	Kingdom Arena, Riyadh, Saudi Arabia	Won vacant WBA Inter-Continental heavyweight title
12	Win	12–0	Alen Babić	TKO	1 (10), 0:36	6 Jul 2024	Copper Box Arena, London, England	
11	Win	11–0	Dmytro Bezus	TKO	1 (8), 2:51	3 Feb 2024	The Cosmopolitan of Las Vegas, Chelsea Ballroom, Paradise, Nevada, US	
10	Win	10–0	Harry Armstrong	TKO	7 (10), 1:19	12 Aug 2023	The O2 Arena, London, England	Won vacant Southern Area heavyweight title
9	Win	9–0	Emilio Salas	TKO	1 (8), 2:07	10 Jun 2023	Wembley Arena, London, England	
8	Win	8–0	Alfonso Damiani	TKO	4 (8), 2:05	11 Mar 2023	Liverpool Arena, Liverpool, England	
7	Win	7–0	Dominik Musil	TKO	1 (6), 2:03	29 Oct 2022	Wembley Arena, London, England	
6	Win	6–0	Michal Reissinger	TKO	2 (6), 0:39	6 Aug 2022	Sheffield Arena, Sheffield, England	
5	Win	5–0	Gabriel Enguema	PTS	6	12 Feb 2022	Alexandra Palace, London, England	
4	Win	4–0	Alvaro Terrero	TKO	2 (6), 2:06	30 Oct 2021	The O2 Arena, London, England	
3	Win	3–0	Danny Whitaker	TKO	2 (4), 1:08	7 Aug 2021	Matchroom Headquarters, Brentwood, England	
2	Win	2–0	Phil Williams	TKO	3 (4), 1:46	1 May 2021	Manchester Arena, Manchester, England	
1	Win	1–0	Matt Gordon	TKO	1 (4), 2:29	20 Feb 2021	Wembley Arena, London, England	

Sporting positions
Regional boxing titles
Vacant Title last held by Daniel Dubois	Southern Area heavyweight champion 12 August 2023 – October 2024; Vacated	Vacant Title next held by Nick Webb
Vacant Title last held by Agit Kabayel	WBA Inter-Continental heavyweight champion 21 December 2024 – 17 May 2025	Succeeded by David Allen
