= Lenroy Thomas =

Jamaican boxer

Personal information
- Nickname: TNT
- Born: 13 March 1985 (age 41) St. Catherine, Jamaica
- Height: 6 ft 2 1/2 in (189 cm)
- Weight: Heavyweight

Boxing career
- Reach: 79 in (201 cm)
- Stance: Southpaw

Boxing record
- Total fights: 32
- Wins: 25
- Win by KO: 13
- Losses: 6
- Draws: 1

Lenroy Thomas (born 13 March 1985) is a Jamaican former professional boxer who competed from 2006 to 2022. At regional level, he held the Commonwealth heavyweight title from 2017 to 2018.

== Early life ==
Born in St. Catherine, Jamaica and based in St. Petersburg, Florida since 1998,

== Professional career ==
Thomas made his professional debut in April 2006 with a points loss to Ruben Rivera. He won his next 16 fights before defeat to Arron Lyons in December 2010. In August 2013 he suffered a fourth-round knockout at the hands of Dominic Breazeale. He won his next two fights before joining ESPN's 2015 Boxcino Tournament, in which he beat Jason Estrada in the quarter-final before being knocked out by Andrey Fedosov in the semi-final.

In May 2017 he faced David Allen for the vacant Commonwealth heavyweight title at Bramall Lane stadium in Sheffield, winning the title on a split decision.

== Professional boxing record ==
32 fights	25 wins	6 losses
By knockout	13	5
By decision	12	1
Draws	1	

No.	Result	Record	Opponent	Type	Round, time	Date	Location	Notes
32	Loss	25–6–1	Agron Smakici	KO	3 (8), 2:59	26 Mar 2022	Aviation Club Tennis Centre, Dubai, UAE	
31	Win	25–5–1	Marcos Antonio Aumada	TKO	4 (8), 2:49	13 Nov 2021	Classic Remise, Duesseldorf, Germany	
30	Win	24–5–1	Fernando Simôes de Almeida	KO	2 (6), 1:03	19 Dec 2020	Universum Gym, Hamburg, Germany	
29	Win	23–5–1	Miguel Cubos	KO	1 (6), 0:53	23 Nov 2019	Bryan Glazer Family JCC Auditorium, Tampa, Florida, US	
28	Loss	22–5–1	Joe Joyce	KO	2 (12), 2:36	5 May 2018	The O2 Arena, London, England	Lost Commonwealth heavyweight title
27	Draw	22–4–1	David Allen	TD	1 (12), 2:18	3 Mar 2018	FlyDSA Arena, Sheffield, England	Retained Commonwealth heavyweight title; Fight stopped after Allen suffered an accidental cut
26	Win	22–4	Ed Fountain	UD	8	4 Nov 2017	Barclays Centre, New York City, New York, U.S.	
25	Win	21–4	David Allen	SD	12	27 May 2017	Bramall Lane, Sheffield, England	Won vacant Commonwealth heavyweight title
24	Win	20–4	Grover Young	KO	4 (6), 2:49	27 Aug 2016	Hilton Bayfront, Saint Petersburg, Florida, U.S.	
23	Loss	19–4	Andrey Fedosov	KO	3 (8), 1:01	10 Apr 2015	Sands Bethlehem Center, Bethlehem, Pennsylvania, U.S.	
22	Win	19–3	Jason Estrada	UD	7	20 Feb 2015	Turning Stone Resort Casino, Verona, New York, U.S.	
21	Win	18–3	Jason Pauley	TKO	4 (6) 1:08	3 May 2014	Convention Centre, Catlettsburg, Kentucky, U.S.	
20	Win	17–3	Travis Fulton	UD	4	21 Mar 2014	A La Carte Event Pavilion, Tampa, Florida, U.S.	
19	Loss	16–3	Dominic Breazeale	KO	4 (6), 2:29	24 Aug 2013	Stubhub Center, Carson, California, U.S.	
18	Loss	16–2	Arron Lyons	TKO	4 (6), 1:53	11 Dec 2010	Jannus Live, Saint Petersburg, Florida, U.S.	
17	Win	16–1	Joseph Rabotte	UD	6	4 Jun 2010	A La Carte Event Pavilion, Tampa, Florida, U.S.	
16	Win	15–1	Homero Fonseca	MD	6	19 Feb 2010	A La Carte Event Pavilion, Tampa, Florida, U.S.	
15	Win	14–1	Andrew Greeley	UD	6	5 Nov 2009	Martin's Valley Mansion, Cockeysville, Maryland, U.S.	
14	Win	13–1	Gabe Brown	UD	6	15 Aug 2009	Mississippi Coast Coliseum, Biloxi, Mississippi, U.S.	
13	Win	12–1	Wes Taylor	TKO	2 (6), 1:16	10 Apr 2009	Sun Dome, Tampa, Florida, U.S.	
12	Win	11–1	Terrell Nelson	UD	4	21 Feb 2009	Madison Square Garden, New York City, New York, U.S.	
11	Win	10–1	Andrew Greeley	UD	6	7 Nov 2008	A La Carte Event Pavilion, Tampa, Florida, U.S.	
10	Win	9–1	Wallace McDaniel	KO	1 (4), 2:53	30 Nov 2007	DoubleTree Westshore Hotel, Tampa, Florida, U.S.	
9	Win	8–1	John Cobb	UD	4	31 Aug 2007	DoubleTree Westshore Hotel, Tampa, Florida, U.S.	
8	Win	7–1	Wayne Hampton	TKO	2 (6), 2:36	2 Mar 2007	MontBleu, Stateline, Nevada, U.S.	
7	Win	6–1	Joseph Kenneth Reyes	KO	2 (4), 0:45	19 Jan 2007	A La Carte Event Pavilion, Tampa, Florida, U.S.	
6	Win	5–1	Jonathan Felton	TKO	2 (4), 1:22	23 Oct 2006	Martin's West, Woodlawn, Maryland, U.S.	
5	Win	4–1	Larry White	UD	4	29 Sep 2006	DoubleTree Westshore Hotel, Tampa, Florida, U.S.	
4	Win	3–1	Maurice Winslow	TKO	2 (4), 1:07	15 Sep 2006	Omar Shrine Temple Mount Pleasant, North Carolina, U.S.	
3	Win	2–1	Gostables Horton	TKO	4 (4), 1:31	16 Jun 2006	Westshore DoubleTree Hotel, Tampa, Florida, U.S.	
2	Win	1–1	Jason Ellison	KO	1 (4), 1:26	22 Apr 2006	Club Cinema, Pompano Beach, Florida, U.S.	
1	Loss	0–1	Ruben Rivera	UD	4	7 Apr 2006	Florida State Fairgrounds, Tampa, Florida, U.S.	

Sporting positions
Regional boxing titles
Vacant Title last held by Anthony Joshua	Commonwealth heavyweight champion 27 May 2017 – 5 May 2018	Succeeded by Joe Joyce
