= Joseph Joyce =

Joe or Joseph Joyce may refer to:

- Joe Joyce (footballer) (born 1961), English right-back
- Joe Joyce (boxer) (born 1985), English heavyweight
- Joe Joyce (rugby union) (born 1994), English rugby union player
- Joseph C. Joyce, American agriculture academic since 1970s
