= Kash Ali =

British boxer

Kashif Ali
Personal information
- Born: 27 January 1992 (age 34) Solihull, England
- Height: 6 ft 6 in (198 cm)
- Weight: Heavyweight

Boxing career
- Reach: 80 in (203 cm)
- Stance: Orthodox

Boxing record
- Total fights: 26
- Wins: 23
- Win by KO: 12
- Losses: 3

Kash Ali (born 27 January 1992) is a British professional boxer.

== Early life ==
Ali was born to a family of Pakistani origin in Solihull, England on 27 January 1992.

== Professional career ==
On 30 March 2019, Ali faced David Price. The bout culminated in the fifth round, when Ali tackled and bit Price on the torso while he was on the canvas. The referee immediately called for a disqualification and awarded Price with the victory.

Ali won the IBF European heavyweight title in May 2021.

On 16 March 2024, Ali faced Joe Joyce. The bout was stopped in the tenth and final round. Ali landed face first on the canvas after Joyce connected with a right hand. Ali beat the count, but the referee took a closer look at him and stopped the fight. The time of stoppage was 2:53 of round 10.

== Personal life ==
Ali is a Sufi Muslim.

== Professional boxing record ==
26 fights	23 wins	3 losses
By knockout	12	1
By decision	11	1
By disqualification	0	1

No.	Result	Record	Opponent	Type	Round, time	Date	Location	Notes
26	Win	23–3	Dylan Courtney	PTS	4	25 Jul 2026	Doncaster Dome, Doncaster, England	
25	Win	22–3	Viktar Chvarkou	PTS	4	31 Jan 2026	Metrodome, Barnsley, England	
24	Loss	21–3	Joe Joyce	KO	10 (10), 2:53	16 Mar 2024	bp pulse LIVE Arena, Birmingham, England	
23	Loss	21–2	Bohdan Myronets	PTS	6	21 Jul 2023	Meadowbank Sports Centre, Edinburgh, Scotland	
22	Win	21–1	Rhys Kaney	TKO	6 (6), 2:26	12 Feb 2022	Ponds Forge Arena, Sheffield, England	
21	Win	20–1	Roman Gorst	RTD	7 (10), 3:00	18 Sep 2021	Ponds Forge Arena, Sheffield, England	Retained IBF European heavyweight title
20	Win	19–1	Tomas Salek	TKO	3 (10), 2:39	28 May 2021	Sheffield Arena Car Park, Sheffield, Sheffield, England	Won vacant IBF European heavyweight title
19	Win	18–1	Phil Williams	RTD	3 (6), 3:00	11 Dec 2020	Sheffield Arena Car Park, Sheffield, Sheffield, England	
18	Win	17–1	Kamil Sokolowski	PTS	6	21 Feb 2020	Metrodome, Barnsley, England	
17	Win	16–1	Artur Kubiak	TKO	2 (6), 1:00	29 Nov 2019	Ponds Forge Arena, Sheffield, England	
16	Loss	15–1	David Price	DQ	5 (10), 2:20	30 Mar 2019	Echo Arena, Liverpool, England	Ali disqualified for biting
15	Win	15–0	Colin Goldhawk	KO	1 (6), 2:27	23 Feb 2019	Holte Suite, Birmingham, England	
14	Win	14–0	Phil Williams	TKO	6 (6), 1:22	27 Oct 2018	Town Hall, Walsall, England	
13	Win	13–0	Lee Carter	KO	2 (6), 0:30	16 Sep 2018	Holiday Inn, Birmingham, England	
12	Win	12–0	David Howe	TKO	2 (10), 0:21	24 Mar 2018	bp pulse LIVE Arena, Birmingham, England	Won vacant Central Area heavyweight title
11	Win	11–0	Hari Miles	PTS	4	1 Oct 2016	York Hall, London, England	
10	Win	10–0	Paul Butlin	TKO	4 (4), 2:57	4 Jun 2016	York Hall, London, England	
9	Win	9–0	Kamil Sokolowski	PTS	4	15 May 2015	Ice Sheffield, Sheffield, England	
8	Win	8–0	Lukas Skirca	TKO	1 (4), 1:45	14 Nov 2014	Ice Sheffield, Sheffield, England	
7	Win	7–0	Luke Martin	TKO	3 (4), 1:51	10 May 2014	Ponds Forge Arena, Sheffield, England	
6	Win	6–0	Rolandas Cesna	PTS	4	29 Nov 2013	Ponds Forge Arena, Sheffield, England	
5	Win	5–0	James Oliphant	PTS	4	4 Oct 2013	Ponds Forge Arena, Sheffield, England	
4	Win	4–0	James Oliphant	PTS	4	17 May 2013	Ponds Forge Arena, Sheffield, England	
3	Win	3–0	Moses Matovu	PTS	4	22 Feb 2013	Magna Centre, Rotherham, England	
2	Win	2–0	Remigijus Ziausys	PTS	4	12 May 2012	Hillsborough Leisure Centre, Sheffield, England	
1	Win	1–0	James Oliphant	PTS	4	26 Nov 2011	Magna Centre, Rotherham, England	

Sporting positions
Regional boxing titles
Vacant Title last held by Nathan Gorman	Central Area heavyweight champion 24 March 2018 – June 2021; Vacated	Vacant Title next held by Chris Healey
New title	IBF European heavyweight champion 28 May 2021 – December 2023; Vacated	Vacant Title next held by Daniel Dietz
