= Kell Brook vs. Errol Spence Jr =

Boxing match

Kell Brook vs. Errol Spence Jr.
- Date: 27 May 2017
- Venue: Bramall Lane, Sheffield, South Yorkshire, UK
- Titles on the line: IBF welterweight title

Tale of the tape
Boxer	(United Kingdom) Kell Brook	(United States) Errol Spence Jr.
Nickname	"The Special One"	"The Truth"
Hometown	Sheffield, South Yorkshire, UK	Dallas, Texas, U.S.
Purse	£3,000,000	£1,000,000
Pre-fight record	36–1 (25 KO)	21–0 (18 KO)
Age	31 years	27 years, 2 months
Height	5 ft 9 in (175 cm)	5 ft 9 in (175 cm)
Weight	146 1/2 lb (66 kg)	146 1/4 lb (66 kg)
Style	Orthodox	Southpaw
Recognition	IBF; Welterweight Champion; The Ring; No. 2 Ranked Welterweight; TBRB; No. 3 Ranked Welterweight	IBF; No. 1 Ranked Welterweight; TBRB; No. 5 Ranked Welterweight; The Ring; No. 7 Ranked Welterweight

Result
- Spence defeated Brook by 11th Round KO

Kell Brook vs. Errol Spence Jr. was a professional boxing match contested on 27 May 2017, for the IBF Welterweight championship.

== Background ==
Kell Brook had made three successful defences of his IBF welterweight belt since his August 2014 victory over Shawn Porter and was ranked by Ring Magazine as the best welterweight in the world. In his previous bout in September 2016, he had moved up two weight divisions to challenge the undefeated top ranked Middleweight champion, Gennady Golovkin. Brook would suffer his first career loss, suffering a damaged eye socket before trainer Dominic Ingle threw in the towel during the fifth round. Despite this, Brook won many admirers for his spirited performance and stepping up two weight divisions to make the fight. Ingle confirmed Brook had gone through surgery successfully.

Following this defeat Brook and his team entered into talks with Amir Khan over a potential grudge fight, while also keeping his IBF mandatory Errol Spence Jr. as an alternative. During negotiations, Khan urged Brook to fight Spence first and eventually talks broke down between Brook and Khan. Eddie Hearn mentioned talks were already ongoing with Spence's manager Al Haymon for a fight to take place possibly in the UK in May. Hearn received an extension from the IBF for negotiations between himself and TGB Promotions boss Tom Brown, as they were progressing. The purse bids for the fight were set for 7 February by the IBF. On 1 February, Hearn claimed that Brook would be keeping his title and making a defence against Spence and that he had reached out to Spence's team, to no reply. He assumed that they wanted the fight to go to purse bids. Spence said that he had no problem travelling to the UK for the fight, regardless of negotiations. With a deal close to being reached a day before the purse bids, the IBF granted a week extension, pushing the purse bid back 7 days. On 13 February a deal was reached for the fight to take place in Sheffield on 20 May 2017. At a press conference at Bramall Lane, Sheffield on 22 March, the fight was officially announced to take place on 27 May 2017 live on Sky Box Office in the UK and Showtime in the US.

This was the first boxing match to be held at Bramall Lane since Herol Graham vs. Lindell Holmes in July 1984.

== The fights ==
=== Undercard ===
Undefeated Super middleweight contender Jamie Cox scored a ninth round technical decision victory over Lewis Taylor and Lenroy Thomas scored a split decision victory over David Allen for the vacant Commonwealth heavyweight title. Allen's father Dave had won on the undercard of the Graham vs Holmes bout in 1984.

=== Groves vs Chudinov ===
In the chief support George Groves challenged former titleholder Fedor Chudinov for the vacant WBA super middleweight title. This was Groves' 4th attempt at a world title, having been stopped twice against Carl Froch and losing a split decision to Badou Jack. Chudinov was making his first appearance in the ring since he lost the title against Felix Sturm in February 2016.

==== The fight ====
After an evenly matched first couple of rounds, with Chudinov walking the Briton down and drawing blood above Groves' left eye in the third round. Groves was cut above the eye in round four after an accidental clash of heads. With the bout finely poised entering the sixth round, Groves landed a right hook and followed up with a barrage of unanswered punches leading to referee Steve Gray stepping in to stop the bout.

==== Aftermath ====
Speaking in the aftermath Groves would credit his trainer Shane McGuigan, "This is the end of a lifetime's work. Shane McGuigan has resurrected my career. Now I'm mature enough to admit that. I feel like I'm the best in the division. I'm willing and ready to fight anyone."

Preceded by vs. Eduard Gutknecht	George Groves's bouts 27 May 2017	Succeeded by vs. Jamie Cox
Preceded by vs. Felix Sturm	Fedor Chudinov's bouts 27 May 2017	Succeeded by vs. Jonathan Barbadillo

=== Main event ===
The 27,000 fans in attendance witnessed an extremely close and competitive contest. After a cagey opening round, Brook was able to land his counter overhand left with greater frequency throughout the first half of the bout and was typically the more aggressive fighter. Spence was able to trouble Brook with a right hook in third round, which forced the champion to stumble back momentarily, and was consistently able to land shots to the body. Spence was sent staggering onto the ropes by a big right hand early in the sixth round but the challenger would quickly regain his composure and would end the round the stronger. By the eighth round Brook's left eye was swelling noticeably and Spence would begin to take control, clearly winning the ninth. Early in the tenth, Spence, having Brook against the ropes, unloaded some heavy power shots, which caused Brook to go out. He beat the count, and Spence attempted to finish the fight but Brook would land a pair of left undercuts that helped him make it out of the round. However with his left eye nearly closing, Brook would sink to one knee just over a minute into the 11th round following a left to the body. He rose to his feet but the referee Howard Foster waved it off.

At the time of the stoppage Spence led on all three scorecards with Adalaide Byrd having it 97–92, Alejandro Lopez 96–93 and Dave Parris 95–94. ESPN's Dan Rafael had it 95–94 in favour of Spence, as did Sky Sports' Carl Froch, BBC Radio 5 Live's Steve Bunce and FanSided. Trainer Adam Booth had it 96–94 and both The Guardian and Showtime's Steve Farhood had it 96–93 for Spence.

Spence landed 246 of 633 punches thrown (39%) while Brook landed 136 of 442 (31%).

== Aftermath ==
Speaking to Sky Sports in the ring after the bout Spence would praise Brook saying "I give Kell all the credit, and the hardcore fans here. A true champion goes anywhere to fight. He has gone to America and fought so I came here. I didn't feel that sharp tonight but true champions still win. He was tired, fatigued but kept firing shots. The goal is to unify the champion and become undisputed welterweight champion of the world."

A clearly disappointed Brook would similarly praise the new champion saying "It was a very tough fight and he is one of the best I've been with, if not the best. I got caught in the seventh in the eye and it felt the same as against Golovkin. I couldn't see out of the eye, so I had to stop. I thought it was very competitive, he won a few rounds, I won a few rounds, I felt I was in the fight. I'm gutted, devastated that in front of my own fans I've lost my belt."

Brook's promoter Eddie Hearn, said that Brook should now move up in weight saying "He took this fight because he didn't want to vacate. He broke his eye socket in the seventh round and kept going. Kell is stubborn, I believe he should move to light-middleweight. Amir Khan is a fight we have wanted for five years, but at the moment it is all about making sure Kell is OK."

The day after the bout Brook confirmed to Sky Sports that a CT scan showed he had broken his left eye socket, meaning he would likely have surgery.

== Undercard ==
Confirmed bouts:

Winner	Loser	Weight division/title belt(s) disputed	Result
(United Kingdom) George Groves	(Russia) Fedor Chudinov	vacant WBA (super) world super middleweight title	6th round TKO
(United Kingdom) Joe Cordina	(United Kingdom) Josh Thorne	Lightweight (4 rounds)	1st round RTD
(United Kingdom) Lawrence Okolie	(Czech Republic) Rudolf Helesic	Heavyweight (4 rounds)	1st round TKO
(United Kingdom) Anthony Fowler	(Latvia) Arturs Geikins	Middleweight (4 rounds)	1st round TKO
(Jamaica) Lenroy Thomas	(United Kingdom) David Allen	vacant Commonwealth heavyweight title	Split decision
(United Kingdom) Jamie Cox	(United Kingdom) Lewis Taylor	vacant WBA Inter-Continental super middleweight title	Unanimous technical decision
(United Kingdom) Andy Townend	(United Kingdom) Jon Kays	vacant Commonwealth Super featherweight	2nd round TKO
Preliminary bouts
(United Kingdom) Kyle Yousaf	(United Kingdom) Louis Norman	Bantamweight (6 rounds)	Points decision
(United Kingdom) Nadeem Siddique	(Hungary) Pal Olah	Light middleweight (4 rounds)	3rd round TKO
(United Kingdom) Atif Shafiq	(United Kingdom) Dean Evans	Light welterweight (4 rounds)	Points decision

== Broadcasting ==
Country	Broadcaster
Canada	Super Channel
Hungary	Sport 1
Panama	RPC
United Kingdom	Sky Sports
United States	Showtime

Preceded by vs. Gennady Golovkin	Kell Brook's bouts 27 May 2017	Succeeded by vs. Sergey Rabchenko
Preceded by vs. Leonard Bundu	Errol Spence Jr.'s bouts 27 May 2017	Succeeded by vs. Lamont Peterson
