= Bohdan Myronets =

British boxer (born 1994)

Personal information
- Born: 29 March 1994 (age 32) Brovary, Ukraine
- Height: 6 ft 5 in (1.96 m)
- Weight: Heavyweight

Boxing career
- Reach: 78
- Stance: Orthodox

Boxing record
- Total fights: 13
- Wins: 11
- Win by KO: 6
- Losses: 1
- No contests: 1

Bohdan Myronets (born 29 March 1994) is a Ukrainian professional boxer.

== Professional career ==
=== Myronets vs. Gorman ===
Myronets produced the best result of his career so far against British prospect Nathan Gorman. Gorman came into the fight in terrible shape and it showed throughout the fight. Myronets used his speed advantage to outbox Gorman for a decision win.

=== Myronets vs. Larduet ===
Myronets caused on a big upset against unbeaten Cuban heavyweight Jose Larduet. Though the fight was close Myronets finished well to win a split decision. Myronets won the WBC Francophone belt in the process, his first title as a professional.

== Professional boxing record ==
12 fights	10 wins	1 loss
By knockout	5	0
By decision	5	1
No contests	1	

No.	Result	Record	Opponent	Type	Round, time	Date	Location	Notes
12	NC	11–0 (1)	Jonathan Exequiel Vergara	NC	2 (8), 2:41	28 Nov 2025	Žalgiris Arena, Kaunas, Lithuania	
11	Win	10–1	Jose Larduet	SD	10	12 Dec 2024	Grand Elysee, Rotherbaum, Germany	Won vacant WBC Francophone heavyweight title
10	Win	9–1	Pavel Sour	TKO	2 (6), 1:01	27 Apr 2024	Olympic Hall, Liepāja, Latvia	
9	Win	8–1	Nathan Gorman	PTS	8	1 Dec 2023	Bolton Whites Hotel, Bolton, England	
8	Win	7–1	Kash Ali	PTS	6	21 Jul 2023	Meadowbank Stadium, Edinburgh, Scotland	
7	Win	6–1	Mekki Sahli	MD	6	28 Oct 2022	Arena Riga, Riga, Latvia	
6	Win	5–1	Serdar Hemrayev	TKO	1 (6), 0:35	29 Jun 2022	Istanbul, Turkey	
5	Win	4–1	Semen Pakhomov	TKO	1 (6), 2:02	23 Dec 2021	Kyiv, Ukraine	
4	Loss	3–1	David Spilmont	UD	6	16 Oct 2021	Arena Riga, Riga, Latvia	
3	Win	3–0	Pavlo Krolenko	UD	6	24 Jul 2021	Studio 69, Riga, Latvia	
2	Win	2–0	Stefano Capone	KO	2 (4), 1:05	26 Sep 2020	Studio 69, Riga, Latvia	
1	Win	1–0	Vladimeri Khurtsia	TKO	2 (4), 1:40	25 Jan 2020	Night Club First, Riga, Latvia	

Sporting positions
Regional boxing titles
Vacant Title last held by Kacper Meyna	WBC Francophone heavyweight champion 12 December 2024 – March 2025; Vacated	Vacant Title next held by Oleksandr Hrytsiv
