= Tom Little (boxer) =

British boxer (born 1987)

Personal information
- Nicknames: Not so; The Gyppopotamus
- Born: Thomas Little; 24 July 1987 (age 39) Hatfield, Hertfordshire, England
- Height: 6 ft 5 in (196 cm)
- Weight: Heavyweight

Boxing career
- Stance: Orthodox

Boxing record
- Total fights: 19
- Wins: 10
- Win by KO: 3
- Losses: 9

Thomas Little (born 24 July 1987) is a British former professional boxer who competed from 2011 to 2020.

== Professional career ==
On 20 June 2012, Little was a competitor in the Prizefighter series on Sky Sports. Little faced Tom Dallas in the quarter-final, losing by technical knockout in the third round.

On 14 November 2013, Little once again competed in the Prizefighter series on Sky Sports. Little faced former world title challenger Brian Minto in the quarter-final, losing by split decision with scores of 29–28 in favour of Little, and 28–29 and 28–29 in favour of Minto.

On 4 November 2017, it was announced that Little would fight Olympic silver medallist Joe Joyce on 17 December on the undercard of Tony Bellew vs. David Haye II. Although, the bout was ultimately cancelled when the event was rescheduled.

On 19 January 2018, it was announced that Little would fight Olympic bronze medallist Filip Hrgović (2–0, 2 KOs) on 27 January 2018, on the undercard of Oleksandr Usyk's cruiserweight unification bout against Mairis Briedis. Hrgović dominated throughout the fight, pressuring with a jab-right hand combination. He finally managed to knock Little down near the end of the fourth round, dropping his opponent with a right straight. Although Little managed to beat the ten-count, he had a cut over his left eye, and would quickly lose by technical knockout.

On 5 April 2018, it was announced Little would face undefeated Daniel Dubois for the vacant English heavyweight title on 23 June 2018. Little lost by TKO in the fifth round.

On 16 November 2018, it was announced Little would face David Price on 22 December 2018, on the undercard of Dillian Whyte vs. Derek Chisora II on Sky Sports Box Office. Little lost by TKO in the fourth round. The fight ended when Price landed a flurry of headshots. Little was hit with a right uppercut and a left hook, and the referee intervened, waving the fight off. The crowd booed, suggesting the stoppage was premature. Little expressed his disgust by shoving the referee. Fans also posted on social media to show their outrage towards the end.

On 26 November 2019, it was announced Little would face Magomedrasul Majidov on 7 December 2019, on the undercard of Andy Ruiz Jr. vs. Anthony Joshua II on Sky Sports Box Office. In preparation for the bout, Little served as a sparring partner for Joshua and Whyte. Little lost by TKO in the second round.

On 21 November 2020, Little faced undefeated Alen Babić, losing by TKO in the third round.

== Professional boxing record ==
| 19 fights | 10 wins | 9 losses |
|---|---|---|
| By knockout | 3 | 6 |
| By decision | 7 | 3 |

| No. | Result | Record | Opponent | Type | Round, time | Date | Location | Notes |
|---|---|---|---|---|---|---|---|---|
| 19 | Loss | 10–9 | Alen Babić | TKO | 3 (8), 2:38 | 21 Nov 2020 | Wembley Arena, London, England | |
| 18 | Loss | 10–8 | Magomedrasul Majidov | TKO | 2 (8), 1:49 | 7 Dec 2019 | Diriyah Arena, Diriyah, Saudi Arabia | |
| 17 | Loss | 10–7 | David Price | TKO | 4 (8), 2:38 | 22 Dec 2018 | The O2 Arena, London, England | |
| 16 | Loss | 10–6 | Daniel Dubois | TKO | 5 (10), 0:58 | 23 Jun 2018 | The O2 Arena, London, England | For vacant English heavyweight title |
| 15 | Loss | 10–5 | Filip Hrgović | TKO | 4 (8), 2:15 | 27 Jan 2018 | Arēna Rīga, Riga, Latvia | |
| 14 | Win | 10–4 | Josh Sandland | TKO | 4 (6), 2:45 | 14 Oct 2017 | York Hall, London, England | |
| 13 | Win | 9–4 | Kamil Sokolowski | PTS | 6 | 27 May 2017 | Metropole Hotel, Brighton and Hove, England | |
| 12 | Win | 8–4 | Tom Dallas | TKO | 1 (10), 0:59 | 11 Feb 2017 | York Hall, London, England | |
| 11 | Loss | 7–4 | Dominic Akinlade | PTS | 10 | 6 Aug 2016 | York Hall, London, England | For Southern Area heavyweight title |
| 10 | Win | 7–3 | James Oliphant | PTS | 4 | 16 May 2015 | Camden Centre, London, England | |
| 9 | Win | 6–3 | Larry Olubamiwo | TKO | 2 (4), 2:51 | 11 Apr 2015 | York Hall, London, England | |
| 8 | Win | 5–3 | Ferenc Zsalek | PTS | 4 | 31 Oct 2014 | Metropole Hotel, Brighton and Hove, England | |
| 7 | Loss | 4–3 | Dorian Darch | PTS | 4 | 11 Jul 2014 | Merthyr Leisure Centre, Merthyr Tydfil, Wales | |
| 6 | Win | 4–2 | Imantas Davidaitis | PTS | 4 | 26 Apr 2014 | WonderWorld, Milton Keynes, England | |
| 5 | Loss | 3–2 | Brian Minto | SD | 3 | 14 Nov 2013 | York Hall, London, England | Prizefighter 32: heavyweight quarter-final |
| 4 | Loss | 3–1 | Tom Dallas | TKO | 3 (3), 1:52 | 20 Jun 2012 | York Hall, London, England | Prizefighter 25: heavyweight quarter-final |
| 3 | Win | 3–0 | Igoris Borucha | PTS | 4 | 21 Jan 2012 | Liverpool Olympia, Liverpool, England | |
| 2 | Win | 2–0 | Hastings Rasani | PTS | 4 | 18 Nov 2011 | York Hall, London, England | |
| 1 | Win | 1–0 | Rolandas Cesna | PTS | 4 | 31 Jul 2011 | Liquid Nightclub, Luton, England | |
