= John Fisher (social media personality) =

English influencer (born 1973)

- Born: 16 October 1973 (age 52)
- Other names: Big John; The Boshfather
- Children: 4, including Johnny Fisher

John Fisher (born 16 October 1973), known by the nicknames "Big John" and "the Boshfather", is an English social media personality. The father of boxer Johnny Fisher, he has amassed a following on social media for his meal reviews, particularly of Chinese food, as well as his catchphrase "BOSH!" at the end of videos.

== Biography ==
Born on 16 October 1973, Fisher was raised in Romford. He previously owned a cheese wholesale business. He boxed at an amateur level in his youth, and was a football coach at local side Romford Royals F.C., where he coached professional footballer Aji Alese. Fisher is married to Charlotte, who he met in the Hollywood nightclub in Romford as a teenager. The couple have four children, including boxer Johnny Fisher, and three dogs. He is a supporter of football club Luton Town and regularly attends their matches.

Fisher began posting on social media in 2022, after a video of him that his son posted went viral. His large Chinese takeaway orders and catchphrase "BOSH!" saw him gain a large following on social media, with his followers being known as "Boshsoldiers". Fisher has done marketing campaigns for Currys, where he reviewed Bosch electronics, and for the Fray Bentos brand of food products. He has over 690,000 followers on Instagram as of December 2025. In October 2025, Zia Yusuf, former chairman of Reform UK, called out Fisher in a social media post, accusing him of being used for "propaganda" by "the media"; Fisher responded by calling Yusuf "out of touch" and saying that he had planned to vote for Reform UK at the next general election, but would no longer do so.

As a public figure associated with Chinese food, Fisher has spoken out against racism against Chinese people. After the Dragon House Chinese takeaway in York was vandalised with racist graffiti, Fisher condemned the attack on social media and said he would visit the takeaway, which he did in October 2025. In September 2025, Fisher appeared on the BBC programme Newsnight, where he discussed Operation Raise the Colours, describing himself as a "proud Englishman" and that he understood why flags were being raised, but saying that there was intermittently an "isolated incident that isn't good".

In October 2025, Fisher was due to make appearances in the Australian cities of Perth and Sydney, at Ascot Racecourse and Hillary's Beach Club respectively, but due to a visa issue he was detained in a deportation hotel. It was reported that Fisher had been travelling on a tourist visa, which would not have allowed him to make promotional appearances. He was deported from the country on 16 October. On social media, Fisher criticised the handling of his situation by border control, saying he had been "treated like a criminal".
