= David Allen (boxer) =

British boxer (born 1992)

Personal information
- Nicknames: The White Rhino, Doncaster De La Hoya
- Born: 21 March 1992 (age 34) Doncaster, England
- Height: 6 ft 3 in (191 cm)
- Weight: Heavyweight

Boxing career
- Reach: 75 in (191 cm)
- Stance: Orthodox

Boxing record
- Total fights: 39
- Wins: 27
- Win by KO: 20
- Losses: 9
- Draws: 2
- No contests: 1

David Allen is a British professional boxer. At regional level, he has challenged twice for the Commonwealth heavyweight title in 2017 and 2018. He holds a notable win over former world heavyweight champion Lucas Browne.

== Professional career ==
=== Early career ===
Allen started his professional career with a six-round points win over Rolandas Cesna in 2012.

=== Consecutive defeats ===
==== Allen vs. Whyte ====
After being undefeated in his first 10 professional fights, he fought Dillian Whyte in July 2016 at short notice for the vacant WBC International heavyweight title, losing by unanimous points decision over ten rounds.

==== Allen vs. Ortiz ====
In December 2016, he fought undefeated Luis Ortiz (26–0) on the undercard of Anthony Joshua vs. Éric Molina, losing by seventh-round stoppage.

=== First Commonwealth title challenge ===
==== Allen vs. Thomas ====
He fought Lenroy Thomas in May 2017 for the vacant Commonwealth heavyweight title, losing a split decision over 12 rounds.

=== Second Commonwealth title challenge ===
==== Allen vs. Thomas II ====
Their rematch in March 2018 was declared a technical draw after Allen suffered a bad cut over the right eye in the first round.

=== Return to the ring ===
==== Allen vs. Yoka ====
Two fights later, Allen travelled to Paris to face undefeated Olympic gold medalist Tony Yoka (4–0), but was unsuccessful in a 10th-round technical knockout loss.

==== Allen vs. Browne ====
The biggest win of Allen's career came in a third-round knockout of former WBA (Regular) champion Lucas Browne in April 2019.

==== Allen vs. Price ====
Allen next fought David Price in July 2019, retiring in the tenth-round to suffer his fifth career loss.

He rebounded from the loss with a third-round knockout victory over Dorian Darch on 8 February 2020 in Sheffield.

=== Retirement ===
In November 2020, Allen announced his retirement from boxing, stating, "I don’t want to get punched anymore." The announcement was reported in an interview with World Boxing News. "Long gone are the days of the kid from Donny who wants to fight. All I want now is a nice quiet life with a wife and some kids. Healthy and happy getting nice and fat." However, in April 2021, he revealed via social media that he plans to return to boxing, saying, ""I had a meeting today and what I wanted was, I wanted to come back and box, but I want to come back at a low level. I want to enjoy my boxing, I want to win titles, whatever titles they may be. I will be boxing again but I won't be coming back and boxing Alen Babic and Fabio Wardley for at least 12 months. I just want to come back and enjoy boxing."

=== Comeback ===
On 27 August 2021, Allen returned from retirement to fight Andrea Pesce at the Ponds Forge Arena in Sheffield. Allen won by technical knockout in the second round.

==== Allen vs. Fisher ====
Allen fought Johnny Fisher (12–0, 11 KOs) on 21 December 2024, at Kingdom Arena in Riyadh, Saudi Arabia as part of the undercard for the heavyweight world title rematch between Oleksandr Usyk and Tyson Fury. Allen knocked Fisher down in the 5th round but ultimately lost the fight in a controversial split decision as two of the ringside judges scored the fight 95–94 for Fisher while the third had it 96–93 in Allen's favour.

==== Allen vs. Fisher II ====
Allen faced Johnny Fisher in a rematch at the Copper Box Arena in London, England, on 17 May 2025. He won by stoppage in the fifth round to inflict the first defeat of his opponent's professional career.

==== Allen vs. Makhmudov ====
Allen fought Arslanbek Makhmudov (20–2, 19 KOs) at Sheffield Arena on 11 October 2025. Allen lost by unanimous decision with the judges scoring the bout 115–111, 117–109 and 116–110 all in favour of Makhmudov.

On 21 February 2026, Allen fought Karim Berredjem (12–10, 3 KOs) at the Nottingham Arena, on the undercard of Leigh Wood vs. Josh Warrington II. Allen knocked out Berredjem in just 57 seconds.

==== Allen vs. Hrgović ====
Allen faced Filip Hrgović in the headline fight on the bill at the Keepmoat Stadium in his hometown of Doncaster on 16 May 2026. He lost by technical knockout when his corner threw in the towel in the third round.

Allen got back to winning ways in his next fight with a points win over Ross McGuigan in a four-round bout at the Magna Centre in Rotherham on 20 June 2026.

==== Allen vs. Carty ====
Allen faced Thomas Carty at Croke Park in Dublin, Ireland, on 5 September 2026. The fight ended in a no contest ruling after his opponent fell through the ropes to the floor in the first round and was unable to continue. In a statement released two days after the fight, Carty's management team said he had been treated in hospital for a suspected concussion and blamed "two illegal blows" and "loose ropes" for his fall. For his part, Allen said he intended to appeal the no contest decision and have it changed to a win.

== Professional boxing record ==
39 fights	27 wins	9 losses
By knockout	20	5
By decision	7	4
Draws	2	
No contests	1	

No.	Result	Record	Opponent	Type	Round, time	Date	Location	Note
39	NC	27–9–2 (1)	Thomas Carty	NC	1 (10) 1:22	5 Sep 2026	Croke Park, Dublin, Ireland	Carty fell out of the ring and was unable to continue on doctor's advice
38	Win	27–9–2	Dan Garber	PTS	4	25 Jul 2026	Doncaster Dome, Doncaster, England	
37	Win	26–9–2	Ross McGuigan	PTS	4	20 Jun 2026	Magna Centre, Rotherham, England	
36	Loss	25–9–2	Filip Hrgović	TKO	3 (10) 2:37	16 May 2026	Eco-Power Stadium, Doncaster, England	For WBA Continental Gold and vacant IBF Inter-Continental heavyweight titles
35	Win	25–8–2	Karim Berredjem	TKO	1 (6) 0:57	21 Feb 2026	Nottingham Arena, Nottingham, England	
34	Loss	24–8–2	Arslanbek Makhmudov	UD	12	11 Oct 2025	Sheffield Arena, Sheffield, England	Lost WBA Inter-Continental heavyweight title
33	Win	24–7–2	Johnny Fisher	TKO	5 (10) 3:00	17 May 2025	Copper Box Arena, London, England	Won WBA Inter-Continental heavyweight title
32	Loss	23–7–2	Johnny Fisher	SD	10	21 Dec 2024	Kingdom Arena, Riyadh, Saudi Arabia	For vacant WBA Inter-Continental heavyweight title
31	Win	23–6–2	Amine Boucetta	PTS	4	13 Jul 2024	Skate Central, Sheffield, England	
30	Win	22–6–2	Jake Darnell	PTS	4	6 Apr 2024	Skate Central, Sheffield, England	
29	Loss	21–6–2	Frazer Clarke	RTD	6 (10), 3:00	2 Sep 2023	Manchester Arena, Manchester, England	
28	Win	21–5–2	Michael Bassett	TKO	1 (6), 1:39	25 Feb 2023	Hilton Hotel Portomaso, St Julian's, Malta	
27	Win	20–5–2	Milen Paunov	TKO	2 (4), 1:33	19 Mar 2022	Hilton Hotel, Newcastle, England	
26	Win	19–5–2	Andrea Pesce	TKO	2 (4), 2:10	27 Aug 2021	Ponds Forge Arena, Sheffield, England	
25	Win	18–5–2	Dorian Darch	KO	3 (6), 0:53	8 Feb 2020	FlyDSA Arena, Sheffield, England	
24	Loss	17–5–2	David Price	RTD	10 (12), 3:00	20 Jul 2019	The O2 Arena, London, England	For vacant WBA Continental heavyweight title
23	Win	17–4–2	Lucas Browne	KO	3 (12), 0:58	20 Apr 2019	The O2 Arena, London, England	
22	Win	16–4–2	Ariel Bracamonte	RTD	7 (10), 3:00	10 Nov 2018	Manchester Arena, Manchester, England	
21	Win	15–4–2	Samir Nebo	KO	1 (10), 1:05	13 Oct 2018	Metro Radio Arena, Newcastle, England	
20	Win	14–4–2	Nick Webb	KO	4 (10), 2:59	28 Jul 2018	The O2 Arena, London, England	
19	Loss	13–4–2	Tony Yoka	TKO	10 (10), 0:43	23 Jun 2018	Palais des Sports, Paris, France	
18	Win	13–3–2	David Howe	TKO	4 (4), 2:40	4 May 2018	Town Hall, Walsall, England	
17	Draw	12–3–2	Lenroy Thomas	TD	1 (12), 2:18	3 Mar 2018	FlyDSA Arena, Sheffield, England	For Commonwealth heavyweight title; Fight stopped after Allen suffered an accidental cut
16	Win	12–3–1	Tom Dallas	TKO	3 (4), 0:37	22 Jul 2017	Brentwood Centre, Brentwood, England	
15	Loss	11–3–1	Lenroy Thomas	SD	12	27 May 2017	Bramall Lane, Sheffield, England	For vacant Commonwealth heavyweight title
14	Win	11–2–1	David Howe	KO	2 (6), 2:24	4 Mar 2017	The O2 Arena, London, England	
13	Win	10–2–1	Lukasz Rusiewicz	TKO	1 (6), 0:31	25 Feb 2017	Hull Arena, Hull, England	
12	Loss	9–2–1	Luis Ortiz	TKO	7 (8), 2:59	10 Dec 2016	Manchester Arena, Manchester, England	
11	Loss	9–1–1	Dillian Whyte	UD	10	30 Jul 2016	First Direct Arena, Leeds, England	For vacant WBC International heavyweight title
10	Win	9–0–1	Jason Gavern	RTD	4 (8), 3:00	26 Mar 2016	Sheffield Arena, Sheffield, England	
9	Win	8–0–1	Fabrice Aurieng	PTS	6	24 Oct 2015	Sheffield Arena, Sheffield, England	
8	Win	7–0–1	Jindrich Velecky	TKO	3 (4), 2:28	29 Aug 2015	Doncaster Dome, Doncaster, England	
7	Win	6–0–1	Larry Olubamiwo	RTD	2 (6), 3:00	7 Jun 2014	Metro Radio Arena, Newcastle, England	
6	Draw	5–0–1	Plamen Nikolov	PTS	4	29 Mar 2014	Metro Radio Arena, Newcastle, England	
5	Win	5–0	Moses Matovu	PTS	4	2 Mar 2014	Octagon Centre, Sheffield, England	
4	Win	4–0	Oliver Nagy	TKO	1 (4), 0:45	19 Oct 2013	Rainton Meadows Arena, Houghton-le-Spring, England	
3	Win	3–0	Deyan Mihailov	TKO	1 (4), 2:45	27 Apr 2013	Sheffield Arena, Sheffield, England	
2	Win	2–0	Laszlo Peczeli	TKO	1 (6), 0:55	2 Mar 2013	Don Valley Stadium, Sheffield, England	
1	Win	1–0	Rolandas Cesna	PTS	6	8 Dec 2012	Don Valley Stadium, Sheffield, England	

Sporting positions
Regional boxing titles
Preceded by Johnny Fisher	WBA Inter-Continental heavyweight champion 17 May 2025 – 11 October 2025	Succeeded by Arslanbek Makhmudov
