= Oleksandr Usyk vs. Tyson Fury II =

Boxing match

Reignited
- Date: 21 December 2024
- Venue: Kingdom Arena, Riyadh, Saudi Arabia
- Title(s) on the line: WBA (Super), WBC, WBO, IBO, The Ring and TBRB heavyweight titles

Tale of the tape
Boxer	Oleksandr Usyk	Tyson Fury
Nickname	The Cat	The Gypsy King
Hometown	Simferopol, Ukraine	Manchester, England
Pre-fight record	22–0 (14 KOs)	34–1–1 (24 KOs)
Age	37 years, 11 months	36 years, 4 months
Height	6 ft 3 in (191 cm)	6 ft 9 in (206 cm)
Weight	226 lb (103 kg)	281 lb (127 kg)
Style	Southpaw	Orthodox
Recognition	WBA (Super), WBC, WBO, IBO, The Ring and TBRB; Heavyweight Champion; The Ring No. 1 ranked pound for pound fighter Former 2-division undisputed champion	WBC/WBO/The Ring/TBRB; No. 1 Ranked Heavyweight; WBA; No. 2 Ranked Heavyweight; Former heavyweight champion

Result
- Usyk wins via 12-round unanimous decision (116–112, 116–112, 116–112)

Oleksandr Usyk vs. Tyson Fury II, billed as Reignited, was a professional boxing match contested on 21 December 2024, for the WBA (Super), WBC, WBO, IBO, The Ring and TBRB championship.

== Background ==
On 29 May 2024, 11 days after Usyk defeated Fury to win the undisputed heavyweight championship, Turki Alalshikh announced that the rematch was scheduled to take place in Riyadh, Saudi Arabia, on 21 December.

On 25 June, Usyk announced that he was vacating the IBF heavyweight title. This was to allow the Daniel Dubois vs. Anthony Joshua fight in September to have the title on the line. Interim champion Daniel Dubois was duly elevated to the full title.

The total purse for the rematch was reportedly worth $190–191 million (£150 million). While the purse split was not disclosed, it was speculated to be either 55/45 or 60/40 in favor of Usyk, which would guarantee him $105–114 million. However, Alexander Krassyuk denied these speculations: "We do not have a specific purse distribution. We have certain agreements: Tyson Fury has agreements with the organizers, and Oleksandr Usyk has agreements with the organizers."

== The fight ==
The fight was just as competitive as the first encounter, with Usyk landing with some stinging shots which pushed Fury back, while Fury landed some hard shots to head and body. He tried to use his height and weight advantage to lean on Usyk and weigh him down, but Usyk did well to fight him off and keep him at a distance. A few times in the fight Fury turned southpaw. He used his footwork to move strategically around the ring.

After 12 rounds Usyk was awarded a unanimous decision victory with all three judges scoring the bout 116–112 in favor of the champion. According to CompuBox, Usyk landed 179 punches out of 423 (42.3% accuracy), while Fury connected on 144 punches of 509 (28.3%).

Writers from ESPN, The Independent, The New York Times, CBS Sports, The Sporting News and Bad Left Hook all had Usyk winning, with scores ranging from 115–113 to 117–111.

== Aftermath ==
Fury felt he did enough to win the rematch. His promoter Frank Warren was shocked at the scorecards, bringing the scorecard sheet into the ring. 5 out of the 12 rounds were all scored unanimously for Usyk on all three judges cards. Prior to speaking to the reporters, Warren showed Fury the scorecards, which led Fury and his team to exit the ring and make their way to the dressing room. Warren said, "I showed it to him, I’m dumbfounded. They gave him four rounds out of 12, which is impossible. I’ve been around a long time, and I know I’m biased, but one judge didn’t give him any rounds from six onwards. Not one round. How can that be? Same with another judge, he gave him one round out of the last six, and the same here with this guy. It’s crazy."

Usyk spoke with respect towards Fury in the post-fight ring interviews, "I very respect this guy because I think he's very tough .. Tyson Fury makes me strong. Tyson is a great opponent. Big man. He's a good man. Tyson, a lot of talk, but it's just show." Usyk felt the rematch was easier than the first. Despite being absent in the ring following the fight, Fury attended the post-fight press conference. He said, "More serious … I thought I won the fight again … I was on the front foot the entire time." When you don't get the knockout, this is what can happen." Heading into the final round, Fury was confident he was ahead. Following the fight, Usyk held aloft a sword in the ring belonging to 17th century Cossack warrior and leader Ivan Mazepa. The sword had been flown in especially from a museum in Ukraine.

Fury then retired (for the second time) on 13 January 2025. In the lead up to Usyk’s rematch against Daniel Dubois, Usyk stated that he believed Fury was still boxing because Fury was a "great man" behind his trash talk ("lot of speak").

=== Main event unofficial scorecards ===
	Agency	Writer(s)	Scorecard	Winner	Reference
1	ESPN	Mike Coppinger	115–113	Usyk	
2	The Independent	Jack Rathborn	116–112	Usyk	
3	MMA Fighting	Bryan Tucker	115–113	Usyk	
4	The New York Times	Luke Brown	117–111	Usyk	
5	CBS Sports	Brent Brookhouse	116–112	Usyk	
6	The Sporting News	Tom Gray	116–113	Usyk	
7	Bad Left Hook	Scott Christ	116–112	Usyk	
Total: Usyk 7, Fury 0

== Undercard ==
Confirmed bouts:

Weight class		vs		Method	Round	Time	Notes
Main Card (PPV)
Heavyweight	Oleksandr Usyk (c)	def.	Tyson Fury	UD	12		^{Note 1}
Heavyweight	Moses Itauma	def.	Demsey McKean	TKO	1/10	1:57	^{Note 2}
Light middleweight	Serhii Bohachuk	def.	Ishmael Davis	RTD	6/12	3:00
Heavyweight	Johnny Fisher	def.	David Allen	SD	10		^{Note 3}
Preliminary Card
Featherweight	Lee McGregor	def.	Isaac Lowe	UD	10		^{Note 4}
Featherweight	Peter McGrail	def.	Rhys Edwards	UD	10
Light heavyweight	Daniel Lapin	def.	Dylan Colin	UD	10		^{Note 5}
Heavyweight	Andrii Novytskyi	def.	Edgar Ramirez	UD	10		^{Note 6}
Super featherweight	Mohammed Alakel	def.	Joshua Ocampo	UD	6

^Note 1 For WBA (Super), WBC, WBO, IBO and The Ring heavyweight titles
^Note 2 For WBO Inter-Continental and vacant WBA International heavyweight titles
^Note 3 For vacant WBA Inter-Continental heavyweight title
^Note 4 For vacant WBC International featherweight title
^Note 5 For WBA and vacant IBF Continental light heavyweight title
^Note 6 For WBC International heavyweight title

== Broadcasting ==
Country	Broadcaster
Worldwide	DAZN
United Kingdom	DAZN/Sky Sports/TNT Sports

Preceded by First fight	Oleksandr Usyk's bouts 21 December 2024	Succeeded by vs. Daniel Dubois II
Preceded by First fight	Tyson Fury's bouts 21 December 2024	Retired
