= Joe Joyce (boxer) =

English boxer (born 1985)

Joe Joyce MBE
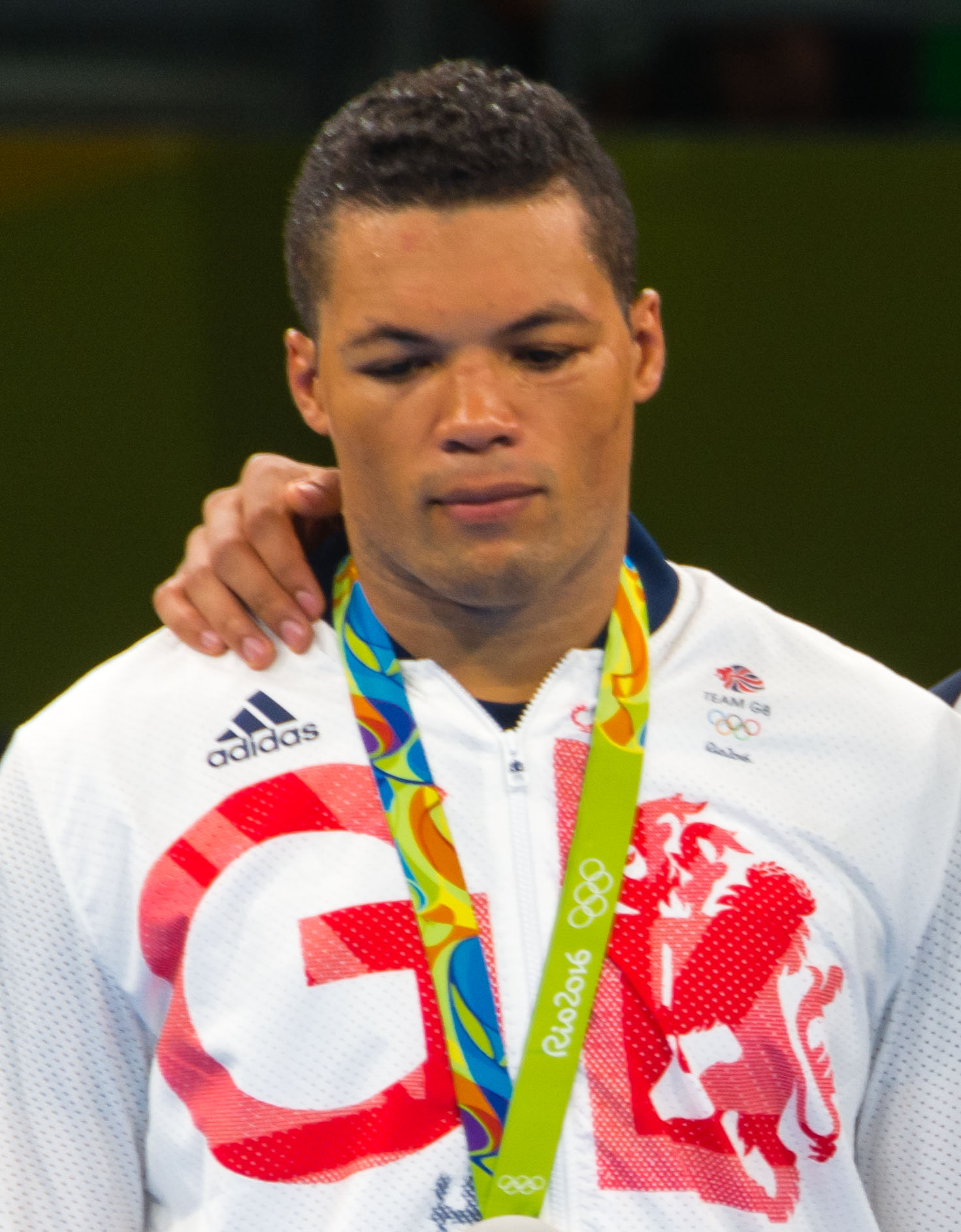
- Joyce at the 2016 Summer Olympics

Personal information
- Nickname: Juggernaut
- Born: 19 September 1985 (age 41) London, England
- Height: 6 ft 6 in (198 cm)
- Weight: Heavyweight

Boxing career
- Reach: 80 1/2 in (204 cm)
- Stance: Orthodox

Boxing record
- Total fights: 21
- Wins: 16
- Win by KO: 15
- Losses: 5
Medal record
Men's amateur boxing
Representing Great Britain
Olympic Games
Silver medal – second place	2016 Rio de Janeiro	Super-heavyweight
European Games
Gold medal – first place	2015 Baku	Super-heavyweight
World Championships
Bronze medal – third place	2015 Doha	Super-heavyweight
Representing England
Commonwealth Games
Gold medal – first place	2014 Glasgow	Super-heavyweight
European Championships
Bronze medal – third place	2013 Minsk	Super-heavyweight
English National Championships
Gold medal – first place	2012 London	Super-heavyweight
Gold medal – first place	2014 Liverpool	Super-heavyweight
GB Championships
Gold medal – first place	2011 London	Super-heavyweight

Joe Joyce (born 19 September 1985) is a British professional boxer. He held the World Boxing Organization (WBO) interim heavyweight title from 2022 to 2023. At regional level, he has held multiple heavyweight championships, including the Commonwealth title twice between 2018 and 2021, the British title from 2020 to 2022, and the European title from 2020 to 2021.

As an amateur, he won a bronze medal at the 2013 European Championships, gold at the 2014 Commonwealth and 2015 European Games, bronze at the 2015 World Championships, and silver at the 2016 Olympics. He currently holds a 93% knockout-to-win percentage.

== Early life and education ==
Born on 19 September 1985 to a Scottish-born Irish father and a Nigerian mother, Joyce grew up in London and studied at Elliott School, based in Putney. He took up boxing at the age of 22, having his interest in track and field athletics curtailed by injuries, and joined Earlsfield ABC, based in Earlsfield, London. Joyce is on record saying 'I don't really like boxing, but I enjoy doing it', highlighting the fact that he was not a big boxing fan growing up, and only started watching some of the greats after getting into boxing properly.

Joyce obtained a BSc degree in Fine Arts at Middlesex University in 2009; he graduated with Upper Second Class Honours. In 2017, Joyce has displays with the Art of the Olympians.

== Amateur career ==
Joyce won the super heavyweight class at the 2012 ABA Championships and 2012 GB Amateur Boxing Championships. He won the bronze in his class at the 2013 European Amateur Boxing Championships after getting KO'd by defending Russian champion Sergei Kuzmin in the semifinal.

He competed in the men's super heavyweight division at the 2014 Commonwealth Games where he won the gold medal. He also won the title at the 2015 European Games in Baku.

He had success during 2015 and 2016 in the World Series of Boxing, and in April 2016 won a gold medal at the European Olympic trials to qualify for the Olympics. On 21 August 2016 Joyce won the silver medal in the super heavyweight class at the 2016 Summer Olympics, losing in the final, via a controversial split decision to Tony Yoka of France. It was the final medal won by Team GB at the Olympics.

== Professional career ==
=== Early career ===
Joyce turned professional in July 2017 at the age of 31, signing with Hayemaker Ringstar. On 6 September 2017, an official announcement was made for the first boxing event which would take place at indigo at The O2 in London on 20 October 2017. Haye confirmed that Joyce would headline the card, making his debut against former British title challenger Ian Lewison (12–3–1, 8 KOs). Joyce put on an impressive display in a hard earned victory. Promoter David Haye spoke to Metro after the bout stating he offered British heavyweight champion Sam Sexton a career-high payday to fight Joyce next, but hadn't heard anything back. He also offered David Allen a fight, who turned it down to rematch Lenroy Thomas. Haye hoped to get Joyce back in action on the undercard of his rematch with Tony Bellew in December 2017.

On 2 November, Joyce confirmed that he would fight on the Tony Bellew vs. David Haye II undercard on 17 December. Two days later, British boxer Tom Little (10–4, 3 KOs) was announced as his opponent. The event was rescheduled to 5 May 2018. On 30 January 2018, Hayemaker Ringstar announced that Joyce would make his next appearance at the York Hall in London on 16 February against 25 year old Croatian boxer Rudolf Jozic (4–1, 3 KOs). On 3 February, whilst backstage at the O2 Arena in London for Lawrence Okolie vs. Isaac Chamberlain, Derek Chisora met with Haye and Joyce, where Chisora revealed Haye had contacted his manager Steve Goodwin and offered £60,000 for him to fight Joyce. Chisora later stated if the money was right, he would fight Joyce on the Tony Bellew vs. David Haye II card on 5 May 2018. Joyce knocked out Jozic in the first round after landing a right hand to the head towards the end of the round. When the result was announced, the timekeeper included the 10-count, announcing the time of stoppage as 3 minutes and 6 seconds. After the fight, Haye stated a new six-figure offer would be presented to Chisora, which would see him earn around the same purse he received in his loss to Agit Kabayel.

On 1 March, speaking ahead of his next fight at the York Hall on 17 March against 7 ft tall American Donnie Palmer, Joyce stated that Chisora had rejected the offer to fight him. Joyce knocked Palmer out inside the first minute of round one at the O2 Arena. On 24 March, after Chisora knocked out his French opponent Zakaria Azzouzi and then called Joyce and Haye over during his post-fight interview with Sky Sports. Prior to calling them over, Chisora referred to Joyce as a Chihuahua. Chisora first asked Haye if he had confidence in Joyce and then stated, "In front of the British public on live television, I'll make a deal with you right now: if he (Joyce) beats me you write me a cheque of £1, if I beat him you give me your purse against Tony (Bellew) and your TV rights." Haye rejected the offer. Chisora then told Haye to not mention his name again. Haye told Sky Sports, "We offered him the same money he got for (Kubrat) Pulev, more money than he got for the European title, but you said no. Okay, we understand."

=== Commonwealth champion ===
On 16 April 2018, it was announced a deal was in place for Joyce to challenge for the Commonwealth heavyweight title against Jamaican boxer Lenroy Thomas (22–4–1, 10 KOs). Two days later, Sky Sports officially announced the fight for 5 May. Joyce entered the ring wearing a sombrero. He knocked Thomas down three times before the fight came to an end in round 2. Two knockdowns came from body shots and the final knockdown came from a left hook to the head. After the fight, Joyce stated he would like to challenge for the British heavyweight title. By winning the belt in just his fourth professional bout, Joyce broke a 106-year record.

On 21 May, it was announced that Joyce would make a first defence of his Commonwealth title on 15 June at the York Hall in London, live and exclusive on Dave. On 8 June, Ghanaian boxer Richard Lartey (12–1, 9 KOs) was confirmed as Joyce's opponent. A day before the fight, Lartey was replaced by Croatian journeyman Ivica Bacurin (29–13–1, 18 KOs). In a non-title fight, Joyce knocked Bacurin out in less than two minutes. After the fight, there was talks around a potential fight with British champion Hughie Fury. On 18 June, Joyce said he was open to fighting American heavyweight Bryant Jennings (23–2, 13 KOs) on 18 August 2018 in New Jersey. Jennings was initially in talks to fight former WBO champion Joseph Parker on the same date, however Parker opted to fight Dillian Whyte on 28 July.

After Kell Brook suffered an ankle injury and ruled himself out of the Whyte-Parker PPV card, there was rumours that Joyce would fight domestic rival Nick Webb on the undercard. Joyce quickly denied the reports and stated he had no intention in fighting in July. He also stated he had parted ways with trainer Ismail Salas after Salas had announced himself semi-retired and moved to Doha, Qatar.

=== Signing with Al Haymon ===
On 24 July 2018, Joyce started a one-month trial with world-renowned trainer Abel Sanchez. Seven days later Joyce and Sanchez reached a deal to team up full time. On 15 August, Joyce signed a deal with powerful American advisor Al Haymon. It was said that Joyce would make his US debut before the end of 2018. On 4 September, it was announced that Joyce would fight Iago Kiladze (26–3, 18 KOs) in an 8-round bout at the Citizens Business Bank Arena in Ontario, California, on 30 September. Joyce kept his unbeaten run alive with a fifth-round knockout win over Kiladze. Joyce knocked Kiladze down three times in dropping him in rounds 2, 3 and 5. The fight was stopped after the third knockdown with Kiladze appearing hurt. The official time of the stoppage was at 41 seconds of the round. Kiladze didn't appear to cause any damage with the shots he landed and Joyce appeared to use his jab more.

==== Joyce vs. Hanks ====
After being listed as a next possible opponent for Joyce, former world title challenger Gerald Washington (19–2–1, 12 KOs) welcomed the bout, which was likely to take place on the Deontay Wilder vs. Tyson Fury Showtime PPV undercard on 1 December 2018. Joyce spent the next few weeks as one of Fury's sparring partners. On 30 October, it was revealed that Joyce would fight returning American boxer Joe Hanks (23–2, 15 KOs) on the Wilder-Fury card at the Staples Center in Los Angeles, California. Joyce weighed 262 pounds compared to Hanks' 247 1/2 pounds. It was reported by the CSAC, Joyce would make $40,000 and Hanks would take home $50,000. Joyce put on an impressive performance in knocking out Hanks in the first round of their scheduled 10 round bout. Hanks had his moments earlier in the round. He landed several clean shots that made Joyce take a few steps back. Joyce came back and hurt Hanks with right hands. Joyce then landed a hard left to the head, knocking Hanks down. Hanks managed to beat referee Jerry Cantu's count; however, the fight was waved off. The time of stoppage was 2 minutes and 25 seconds of round one, awarding Joyce the vacant WBA Continental heavyweight title. In the post-fight presser, Joyce called out Luis Ortiz, also stating he was ready for bigger challenges. Ortiz accepted, claiming he does not turn down a challenge.

==== Joyce vs. Stiverne ====
On 23 January 2019, PBC announced Joyce would return to the UK and fight former world titleholder Bermane Stiverne (25–3–1, 21 KOs) on the James DeGale-Chris Eubank Jr. PPV undercard on 23 February 2019 at The O2 Arena in London. Joyce explained the fight was made after Stiverne made comments about "taking Joyce to school", when they sparred previously. Stiverne explained he felt insulted that Joyce, who had only 7 professional bouts under his belt, wanted to fight him. Before the fight, Joyce stated he would not be finishing the fight in round 1, as he 'was not there yet', but predicted he would take Stiverne out by round 8. Stiverne came into this fight at 273 pounds. Joyce kept his knockout streak alive by finishing Stiverne in round 6 of their scheduled 12 round bout. Both boxers started the fight aggressively throwing punches. By round 2, Joyce began landing shots which wobbled Stiverne. With his guard no longer high, Stiverne stayed on his feet and finished the round. In round 3, Joyce landed a big right hand, which sent Stiverne into the ropes, forcing the referee to make a 10-count. Stiverne recovered and managed to get through the next couple of rounds due to Joyce slowing down his pace. The end came when Joyce trapped Stiverne against the ropes in round 6 and landed two right hands, forcing referee Howard Foster to stop the action. Stiverne had no complaints with the stoppage and walked slowly back to his corner. After the bout, Joyce's co-promoter Richard Schaefer said Joyce would likely return on Wilder's undercard in May and then look to challenge for the WBA 'Regular' title later in the year. With the win, Joyce retained the Commonwealth belt and won the vacant WBA Gold heavyweight title.

In March 2019, Joyce became the mandatory challenger for European heavyweight champion Agit Kabayel. Joyce also became linked with fighting British prospect Daniel Dubois for the vacant British heavyweight title, with Frank Warren also stating he had no issued with making the fight happen. On 17 April 2019, Joyce revealed he had split with trainer Abel Sanchez, having moved back to UK to train with Adam Booth in London.

=== Signing with Queensberry ===
==== Joyce vs. Ustinov ====
On 25 April 2019, Joyce signed with Frank Warren's Queensberry Promotions to co-promote him, alongside Ringstar Sports. It was announced Joyce would return to the ring on the undercard of Billy Joe Saunders vs. Shefat Isufi on 18 May at Broadhall Way in Stevenage, England. On 2 May, 42 year old former world title challenger Alexander Ustinov (34–3, 25 KOs) was announced as Joyce's opponent, subject to a visa. Joyce explained he could have waited for a bigger fight in July, but wanted to stay busy instead, not fighting another journeyman. Joyce won the fight via TKO in round 3. In round 1, Joyce started off picking his shots behind the jab. Ustinov also managed to land a small number of shots, which had no impact on Joyce. Joyce increased his output in round 2, putting pressure on Ustinov, who did not land very much and began holding on. By the end of round 2, Ustinov was on unsteady legs. Both boxers started round 3 trading, with both landing clean shots. Joyce being more active, was throwing with both hands and managed to land a clean left hand to Ustinov's head, dropping him near the ropes. Ustinov slowly tried to beat the count, but was unable to, and counted out. Joyce said after the fight backstage, "The proof's in the pudding. You tell Eddie, you know, winning this fight like that, before Hunter, proves to the world, and to Eddie, that I am a credible opponent [for Joshua]." Joyce felt the win would help him get a world title opportunity by the end of 2019.

==== Joyce vs. Jennings ====
Joyce would next be scheduled to fight at The O2 Arena in London, on 13 July 2019, on the Daniel Dubois vs. Nathan Gorman: Heavy Duty card. On 22 May, Joyce's manager Sam Jones revealed that he was unable to agree a deal with Alexander Povetkin, Joseph Parker, Derek Chisora and Agit Kabayel to fight Joyce in July. He stated he would now look at the likes of Éric Molina, Bryant Jennings and Chris Arreola. A day later, Jennings came out as being the favourite to fight Joyce. Jennings teased the announcement via his social media, when he tagged "Grind 7/13 O2 Arena", under a video segment of him working out. Sam Jones replied to the tweet, "He's going to need more than a vegan diet and a six-pack to deal with Joe." On 29 May, Jennings (24–3, 14 KOs) was confirmed as his opponent and toughest test since turning professional.

On the night, Joyce was taken the full distance for the first time in his career, winning a unanimous decision with scores of 118–109, 117–110 and 115–112, with the irregular scores due to Jennings being deducted a point for a low blow. Joyce also retained his WBA 'Gold' title. Jennings landed body shots in the opening round which caused Joyce to clinch. Joyce was more active in round 2. Jennings seemed to out work Joyce during the middle rounds, but was not always enough to score the round in his favour. By the second half of the fight, Joyce had taken over. Jennings's tried to keep up and warned for low blows, eventually being deducted a point in round 10. Joyce was also warned during the fight, but never had any points taken off. In the post-fight interview, Joyce said, "I want to return in October or November. I'm ready for anyone… (WBA "Regular" heavyweight titlist) Manuel Charr, that's the one. I want to be a world champion." Although it was a clear win for Joyce, some felt the scorecards were too wide in his favour.

==== Joyce vs. Wallisch ====
Over a year later, Joyce returned to the ring on 25 July 2020 against Michael Wallisch in a behind-closed-doors bout in Stratford. After knocking Wallisch down three times in the first three rounds, the referee stopped the fight resulting in a third-round technical knockout victory for Joyce. This fight was made due to the ongoing postponement of Joyce vs. Dubois, to keep Joyce active and give him rounds.

==== Joyce vs. Dubois ====
On 7 February 2020, a press release came out to officially announce Joyce vs. Daniel Dubois (15–0, 14 KOs). The fight was scheduled to take place on 11 April at The O2 Arena in London, live on BT Sport Box Office. Dubois would be defending his British, Commonwealth, WBC Silver and WBO International titles and Joyce would be defending his WBA Gold title. The fight was billed as "Seek & Destroy". The fight was promoted by Frank Warren's Queensberry Promotions. Dubois said the fight would be his 'most devastating performance' of his career. Days after the fight was announced, Joyce split with trainer Adam Booth. He had reportedly signed with his former trainer Ismael Salas and headed to Las Vegas to train at the UFC Training Center. The split with Booth was amicable, according to Joyce and his manager Sam Jones. Salas became Joyce's fourth trainer in only his eleventh professional fight. Salas stated Joyce would be in top shape for the fight. Although his previous coaches did a good job, they never understood his body. He also stated Joyce would be Dubois' biggest test, someone he has been following since his debut. On 20 February, it was confirmed the vacant European heavyweight title would be at stake.

On 12 March, Frank Warren stated the fight was still scheduled to take place despite the coronavirus concerns and everything would be closely monitored. On 26 March, the BBBofC had cancelled all UK boxing events and lockdown in the UK was also confirmed. The fight was pushed back to 11 July 2024. Frank Warren did not want the fight to take place behind closed doors. By May 2020, the July fight date was also looking unlikely, due to the British Board's request to have any events without an attendance. Joyce was open to having an interim bout in between. On 25 June, the fight was again rescheduled. This time to take place on 24 October at The O2 Arena. Warren hoped by then, the BBBofC would allow limited crowd to attend the event. Joyce had an interim bout against Michael Wallisch, on 25 July, who he defeated via 3rd-round TKO. On 29 August, Dubois stopped late replacement Ricardo Snijders in round 2. Dubois was originally scheduled to fight unbeaten two-time Olympic Erik Pfeifer.

There was speculation the fight would likely be pushed back further another month. Both boxers said they would take the fight without any fans. On 6 October, Warren announced the fight would take place on BT Sport, without pay-per-view, which was considered a huge reversal, on 28 November at Church House in London. The fight billing changed to "At Last" after being rescheduled three times. Prior to the fight, the bookmakers had Joyce the underdog heading in. Joyce felt insulted and overlooked. Majority bookmakers also had the fight expected to not go the distance. Joyce stated this boosted his confidence going into the fight and vowed, "people who bet on me will have a nicer Christmas." Joyce was also criticised on is physique when he fought Wallisch. The fight was looked at a genuine 50–50, with many boxing pundits and boxers unable to separate the two. Only two days before the fight, Joyce team hit a setback as trainer Salas tested positive for Covid upon arriving at the hotel in London. The fight was still scheduled to go ahead with Steve Broughton brought in Joyce's corner alongside Jimmy Tibbs. Dubois weighed 244.4 pounds. Joyce came in heavier at 258.9 pounds.

In a competitive fight, it was the jab of Joyce that made the biggest difference swelling the eye of Dubois from the second round and closing the eye by the tenth round. Dubois was unable to continue in the tenth round: he pawed at his swollen left eye and voluntarily went down on one knee taking a ten count from the referee, before being counted out. In an upset victory, Joyce was declared the winner by tenth-round stoppage loss. In his post-fight interview, Joyce declared, "I'm ready for [the WBO's #1 ranked heavyweight] Oleksandr Usyk. Daniel has got some power but I've felt power like that before. With my experience I've learnt to ride them." At the time of stoppage, only one judge had Joyce ahead 87–84 and the other two judges had Dubois ahead 86–85 and a controversial 88–83, only giving Joyce two rounds. According to the CompuBox Stats, Dubois landed 146 of his 486 punches thrown, at 30% connect rate. 82 landed were power shots. Joyce was less accurate, landing 125 of his 544 thrown, at 23% connect. Joyce landed 98 jabs which was 79.6% of his total output. Dubois was hit with claims that he quit from fellow boxers and pundits, however was also backed by some, saying it was the right decision and potentially saved his career. Following the fight it was revealed that Dubois had suffered a broken left orbital bone and nerve damage around the eye and would be out of action for around six months.

==== Joyce vs. Takam ====
On 16 June 2021, it was announced that Joyce's next fight would be against former world title challenger Carlos Takam (39–5–1, 28 KOs) on 24 July at the Wembley Arena. This was a frustrating time for Joyce as Anthony Joshua and Tyson Fury were locked into negotiations and the world titles all being tied up. Joyce also tried to chase a fight with Oleksandr Usyk. In May, negotiations collapsed between team Joshua and Team Fury, which meant Usyk, mandated by the WBO, would get his opportunity to fight Joshua. Takam was going into the fight confident after having a chat with Francis Ngannou, who advised Takam of Joyce's power. Ngannou sparred Joyce leading up to his fight with Dubois in 2020. Joyce was going into the fight looking to extend his new stoppage streak. At the weigh in, Joyce came in heavy at 263¾ pounds and Takam weighed 248½ pounds.

After a slow start from Joyce on the night, in which Takam landed numerous punches to the head and body of Joyce in the opening rounds, Joyce staggered his opponent at the start of the sixth round, overwhelming him with a barrage of punches and forcing referee Steve Gray to halt the fight. The official result was a sixth-round technical knockout victory for Joyce. In his post-fight interview, he named the two opponents that he would be interested in facing next: "What I want is AJ or [Oleksandr] Usyk."

==== Inactivity ====
On 26 July, Warren spoke about the possibilities of Joyce's next fight. A date in October 2021 was being discussed. Fury was due to defend his WBC belt against Deontay Wilder in their trilogy. Warren didn't think Joshua would want the fight. He also discussed Derek Chisora, who was at Joyce's last fight, as his possible next opponent. At the same time, Warren was not convinced that Chisora would be too keen to take on Joyce next, stating he would likely pursue a rematch with Joseph Parker. Warren rightly claimed there was more reward in beating Joyce, as it would make Chisora the WBO mandatory, rather than fight the lower-ranked Parker. Joyce then spoke on the possible fight, "If Chisora wants it, I am here. I called him out very early on in my career but he never wanted the smoke. If he wants the fight - he can have it." The EBU ordered Joyce to make a defence of his European title against mandatory challenger Marco Huck. The order was made prior to Joyce's fight with Takam. The purse bid was won by Huck Box Promotions with an offer of €260,000. On 17 August, Joyce was stripped of the European title.

On 28 August, Joyce extended his promotional contract with Queensberry Promotions with a new multi-fight deal. Warren said: "I am delighted Joe has agreed a long-term contract renewal with us at Queensberry for the period of time where we are confident he will be crowned WBO world champion." Joyce was ranked No.2 with WBO, and due a mandatory fight in the near future.

On 1 September 2021, Parker's manager David Higgins made his name available for a fight against top ranked contenders. At the time, Parker was ranked no 3 with WBO. Due to the world titles being tied up in defences, the top ranked boxers struggled to make fights as the risk of losing would mean to lose their opportunity for a world title fight. Joyce's manager Sam Jones acknowledged Parker as a potential opponent alongside Andy Ruiz Jr. and Luis Ortiz. Joyce claimed Ortiz has rejected an offer to fight him. During an interview with iFL TV, Joyce said he did not believe Ortiz wanted to fight him and when asked if Ortiz had actually turned down a fight, Joyce said "Yeah. He didn't want a war." A few days later Ortiz hit back at these claims and said an offer was never made and no contact was made to either himself, his manager Jay Jimenez or his coach Herman Caicedo. Ortiz stated he would never turn down a fight and offered Joyce a fight in December, where Ortiz was scheduled to make a ring return, on a Gervonta Davis undercard.

Usyk defeated Joshua to claim the unified WBO, WBA and IBF world titles. Joyce, being mandatory challenger, expected to be mandated next, however Joshua activated a rematch clause, which meant he would fight Usyk again. "We're waiting for the WBO to decide what they're going to do regarding their mandatory for [Oleksandr] Usyk. They'll probably allow Usyk another fight in between. They've called for a rematch with AJ. But the winner of that will have to fight [Joyce]." The Usyk-Joshua rematch was expected to take place in March 2022. A date in April 2022 was next looked at for a possible fight. In February, David Higgins again made it known that his fighter Parker would be open to a fight against in the UK. Parker was coming off his second consecutive win over Derek Chisora. Team Joyce were expected to make an offer for the potential showdown.

During the ongoing negotiations between the teams of Joyce and Parker, Joyce put his name forward along with others to fight Joshua. Joshua's rematch against Usyk was heading for a venue in Ukraine, however plans quickly stalled after Russia's invasion of Ukraine in February 2022. Hearn said either a new location would be pursued or the fight would be postponed altogether. Joyce and Joshua began a back and forward spat on social media. Joshua claimed he'd end Joyce's unbeaten run in one round, like he had done previously. Joyce hit back claiming Joshua was having a meltdown and alleging everything had been given to Joshua in his career.

==== Joyce vs. Hammer ====
In April 2022, during the Fury-Whyte PPV, with both Joyce and Parker present, Frank Warren told Steve Bunce, a fight between the two would take place in September at a stadium. A date and location for the Usyk-Joshua rematch had not been set. On 27 May, it was announced that Joyce would return to the ring after nearly a year out, on the undercard of Jason Cunningham vs. Zolani Tete at the OVO Arena Wembley on 2 July 2022. Experienced German contender Christian Hammer was announced a Joyce's opponent, with the card scheduled to take place on BT Sport. During this time, Joseph Parker signed a multi-fight promotional deal with Warren's rival Ben Shalom with Boxxer, who had an exclusive broadcast deal with Sky Sports, potentially putting a future fight at jeopardy, as Joyce was contractually tied with Queensberry, who had an exclusive deal with BT Sports. At the time of the fight, Joyce had not fought in 49 weeks. In that time, he also recovered from a wrist injury. Joyce stood on the scales at 265.9 pounds and Hammer weighed 263 pounds.

Joyce dropped Hammer four times, en route to a fourth round stoppage win to extend his unbeaten run. Joyce opened the fight strong, forcing Hammer to cover up against the ropes following a left hook. Hammer landed a few power shots of his own with Joyce walking through them. Round 2 saw Joyce pile on more pressure tiring Hammer and looking defeated at the rounds end. Hammer was rocked multiple times in round 3 taking shots to the head. To close the round, Joyce landed a shot to the body and a left hook to the head, scoring the first knockdown. Hammer went down on one knee, however the bell rang to end the round. Hammer was dropped again in round four following a left body shot. Hammer beat the count and began swinging towards Joyce, only to be caught with a right hand, sending him down again a third time. Hammer, once again got up, to get dropped a fourth and final time after a body shot. Referee Victor Loughlin stopped the fight. The time of stoppage was 1 minute and 20 seconds.

After the fight, Joyce asserted, "I'm top level ready for the world stage. I'm ready for all comers and I'm looking to fight the winner of AJ-Usyk, maybe Tyson Fury. I'm at that level." Warren confirmed Joyce would next fight on 24 September. Names mentioned were Parker or the winner of the Usyk vs. Joshua rematch. Warren later added Deontay Wilder's name to the shortlist as a potential opponent.

=== WBO interim heavyweight champion ===
==== Joyce vs. Parker ====
On 3 August 2022, it was reported the fight was set and an official press conference would take place later in the week to formally announce Joyce vs. Joseph Parker (30–2, 21 KOs) in a 12-round heavyweight contest on BT Sport Box Office in the UK. It was expected to take place on ESPN+ in the United States, this was later confirmed weeks later. There was a lot of back and forth trash talk at the presser. Most came from Joyce, who claimed Parker only took the fight because he had nowhere else to go. He knew the winner would ultimately be pushed towards a world title fight. Joyce also claimed it was the biggest fight of his career. The fight was billed as "Nowhere To Run". The fight was scheduled to take place at the AO Arena in Manchester, UK. On 31 August, the fight stakes were raised, following a joint request from Queensberry Promotions and BOXXER, the World Boxing Organisation approved the fight for their interim heavyweight title. As a former WBO titlist, Parker used this as additional motivation. Earlier in the year, he had turned down an IBF eliminator against Filip Hrgović. There was a rematch clause placed in the contract, only for Joyce, if Parker was able to beat him. Had Joyce won, Parker would not be able to activate a rematch clause. Parker claimed this showed weakness on team Joyce's side. According to Parker, when the fight was first being negotiated, there was no talk of a rematch clause. Parker credited his performance in the Chisora rematch, where he felt he performed much better than the first bout, indicating this was the reason for Joyce's team putting the clause in. Parker believed the fight would not have been agreed, had his team not agreed to the clause. Parker had a record of 3–0 at the AO Arena prior to the bout. Joyce weighed 271.6 pounds, sixteen pounds more than Parker, who came in at a career-high 255.4 pounds.

In a fast-paced bout in which both men landed power punches, Joyce was able to bloody Parker's nose and open a cut above his eye, fighting largely on the front foot and using his jab to set up his attacks, while Parker was able to work off the back foot, finding some success with the left hook and overhand right. In the eleventh round, Joyce knocked his opponent down with a powerful left hook. Parker was able to rise to his feet, but the referee deemed it unsafe for him to continue, halting the fight to declare Joyce the winner by eleventh-round knockout. With the result, Joyce became the first man to stop Parker, who had previously never been knocked out. Joyce made it clear that he wanted to face the full WBO champion next, saying, "[Oleksandr] Usyk, let's get it on." At the time of stoppage, Joyce was ahead 97–92, 97–94 and 96–94 on all three judges scorecards.

Joyce was active throughout the fight, in particular rounds between 6 and 11. Compubox stats showed he landed a total of 308 of his 844 shots thrown, 96 of which were body shots and a total of 106 jabs landed. His connect rate was 36.5%. Parker only landed 147 of his 566 thrown (26%). Speaking days after the fight, Parker told reporters, "Joe Joyce is right at the top. The pressure, the punches, the determination just to keep pushing, just respect for what he showed." He ranked Joyce above Joshua and Andy Ruiz.

==== Joyce vs. Zhang ====
In December 2022, Joyce told Sky Sports that he planned to stay busy, next scheduling a fight for March 2023. No opponents were announced. There was still ongoing negotiations between Fury and Usyk. Fury previously stated, had talks broken down again, he would fight Joyce in the interim. Joyce also spoke about how he did not want to become inactive and wait for a title shot, like other contenders do. Instead, to stay active and improve himself in the ring. It was reported on 20 January 2023, 39 year old Chinese contender Zhang Zhilei (24–1–1, 19 KOs) was to challenge Joyce for the interim WBO title at on 15 April in London. No details had been finalised at this stage. Zhang was coming off a close decision loss to fellow contender Filip Hrgović, after dropping him in the opening round in August 2022.

When asked, Joyce said he would prefer to fight Fury over Usyk, but was not writing off Usyk. On 2 February, Queensberry Promotions announced Joyce would defend his WBO Interim heavyweight title at the Copper Box Arena in London against Zhang on 15 April. The fight would take place on regular BT Sport. Frank Warren explained, whilst they wanted to keep Joyce busy before an inevitable world title fight, he would still take on tough challenges. One of the reasons for fighting Zhang was due to him being southpaw, which would help prepare for a future showdown with Usyk. There was a lot of positive response for the fight and many saw it as a 50–50. Many also believed Zhang should have got the decision against Hrgović. Joyce spoke about his frustration at how Dubois got himself into a mandatory position and a world title fight before him. He also mentioned Hrgović being in a better position than him, but stated it was out of his control and all he could do was continue and win fights.

Prior to the fight taking place, Zhang warned, "Joe Joyce has good punch resistance but he has never felt Chinese power." This was in reference to Joyce seemingly walking through previous opponents punches. Zhang's trainer Shaun George said they were going into the fight to avoid 'old-fashioned boxing politics', and look for a stoppage. For the fight, two American judges, Mike Fitzgerald and Efrain Lebron, and one English judge, Phil Edwards were chosen by the BBBofC. British referee Howard Foster was chosen as the third man in the ring. George also voiced concern about the referee decision, as Foster had often been criticised for stopping fights early. Joyce stepped on the scales at 256 pounds, his lowest in four years. Zhang was a pound heavier than his previous fight, weighing in at 278 pounds.

In a surprise upset, Joyce lost the fight via TKO in round six, marking the first loss of his professional career. The repeated heavy shots from Zhang caused swelling above Joyce's right eye, causing the referee to wave off the fight. The time of stoppage was 1:34 of the round. In round 1, Zhang took a close round. In the next round, the action picked up. Zhang managed to catch Joyce a few times and ended up drawing blood from his nose. Joyce did his best to fight back towards the end of the round. Round 3 and 4 saw more of the same. Joyce did well to earn round 3 for himself. Zhang came out and landed his power shots to Joyce's chin. Joyce's right eye began to close rapidly through round 5. Joyce was still able to land his jab clean. The ring doctor checked Joyce's right eye after the round. The fight continued on and in round 6, Zhang piled on the power shots landing a 5-punch combination to Joyce's head. Referee Howard Foster stopped the action to bring in the doctor, who rightly stopped the fight. At the end of the fight, the right eye of Joyce was completely closed. Joyce said it was difficult fighting a southpaw after a long time and he had trouble trying to avoid Zhang's left hand. Joyce was disappointed with his performance but credited Zhang on his win.

According to Compubox, although Zhang threw 284 few punches than Joyce, he was much more accurate. Joyce landed 85 of 464 punches thrown (18.3%) and Zhang landed 82 of 180 punches thrown (45.6%). Zhang connected with 78 power shots. According to the broadcast team, one judge had Joyce ahead by one round at the time of stoppage. This was called out by fans on social media.

A week after the loss, with a rematch clause in place, Joyce advised that he may take another fight in the interim before having a rematch with Zhang. A decision was to be made by team Joyce, dependant on how well the recovery of Joyce's eye injury came along. Joyce stated although the eye was badly bruised, it did not impair his vision and he could still see. Speaking to iFL TV, Zhang said he respected Joyce more after sharing the ring with him. He praised Joyce's toughness and constant pressure in the ring and welcomed a rematch. Had Joyce not activated the immediate rematch clause, Zhang would have options. Part of the deal for the first bout with Zhang winning, would see him promoted under the Queensberry Promotions banner for the foreseeable. Zhang's co-manager Terry Lane confirmed this.

==== Joyce vs. Zhang II ====
On 12 June 2023, Zhang confirmed he would defend his interim WBO heavyweight title in a rematch against Joyce, after Joyce activated the rematch clause. The rematch was scheduled to take place at the OVO Arena Wembley in London on 2 September on BT Sport in the UK and ESPN+ in the United States. On 29 June, a press release confirmed all the details of the fight, with the card taking place on the newly rebranded TNT Sport, following the joint venture between BT Group and Warner Bros. Discovery EMEA. Joyce said he had learned from his previous mistakes. Zhang said he would approach this fight as if he had never fought Joyce before and make history again. Due to the heavyweight mandatory rotation system, the WBO were yet to call. Current unified champion Oleksandr Usyk was scheduled to defend his titles against Daniel Dubois in August 2023. A win for Joyce meant he would become next in line to challenge the winner.

Joyce previously stated he overlooked Zhang in their first meeting. Trainer Ismail Salas admitted even he overlooked Zhang, but promised the rematch would be different. A week before the fight, Zhang downplayed Joyce's power, saying it was not as he had imagined. Zhang said he enjoyed being in the ring with Joyce, as Joyce did not move his head much and switch his angles, thus making him an easy target. One of the reasons he kept landing his left hand. For the rematch, the three judges were from South Africa, China, and England. Steve Gray was chosen to referee the bout. Despite the mixture of judges, Zhang's trainer Shaun George still did not believe they should leave it to the judges and planned to get a consecutive stoppage win. This was because Zhang was only ahead by one round on two judges scorecards and one judge had Joyce ahead by one round in their first fight. Joyce was a 9–1 favourite going into the first fight. For the rematch, Zhang was the favourite, only slightly. Despite this, George expected the same result as the first fight. At the weigh in, Joyce weighed a career-high 281.2 pounds. He was 25.2 pounds heavier than the previous fight. Zhang also weighed a career-high 287 pounds, 9 pounds heavier than previously. Despite the extra weight, Joyce assured it would not affect his speed.

In front of a stunned crowd, Zhang stopped Joyce in third round, in what was described as a highlight reel right hook knockout. Zhang was more dominant in the rematch than the first fight. By the end of round 2, Joyce had swelling under both his eyes, again caused by hard shots, which Joyce was unable to avoid. The end came in round 3 when Joyce attempted to throw a right hand. Zhang, seeing this coming, landed a sharp right hook of his own, landing clean and dropped Joyce face first onto the canvas. Joyce stayed on the canvas for a few moments before trying to get up. However, the fight was stopped as Joyce got to his feet. The time of the stoppage was at 3:07 of round three. After the fight, Warren said Joyce would need to consider retirement following back-to-back defeats as it would be a hard journey back to mandatory status. Joyce said he would come again and retirement was not an option. He took on the challenges he believes he did not need to take, considering the position he was in. Joyce stated he was open to a possible rematch with Daniel Dubois, who in August, was stopped in his attempt to capture the world titles from Usyk. Zhang landed 39 of his 104 punches thrown (36.5%), 29 of them being power shots. Joyce landed only 16 of his 133 thrown (12%) with 10 of them being jabs.

Rumours circulated following Frank Warren's comments, that he had given up on Joyce. Warren hit back at these claims to suggest his words were misconstrued and re-iterated that he would stand by Joyce, just as he has stood by previous boxers under him who suffered setbacks, namely Daniel Dubois more recently. Warren said if Joyce continued his career, he would remain under the Queensberry banner and matched with top 10 ranked heavyweights with the different organisations, in order to help him climb back up the rankings.

=== Post-title career ===
==== Joyce vs. Ali ====
On 30 December, Joyce confirmed he would continue to box on. He expected a return date in March 2024 and also expressed interest to fight in Saudi Arabia, under Riyadh Season. There was a number of contenders being looked at for a potential opponent. On 16 January 2024, Boxing News announced Joyce would begin his career rebuild under a 'Magnificent 7' card against former IBF European champion Kash Ali (21–2, 12 KOs) on 16 March. The card was confirmed days later to take place at the Resorts World Arena in Birmingham, live on TNT Sport. Ali was best known for his disqualification loss to David Price after tackling him to the ground and biting him on his body in round 5. In February, Dubois pulled out of any negotiations for the vacant European title against German boxer Granit Shala. Joyce was named the next challenger with deadline for purse bids set as 29 February. Joyce was still scheduled to fight Ali. Joyce eventually pulled out of purse bids. Joyce, for a third consecutive time, came in a career high weight. He weighed 286.8 pounds. Ali weighed 238.1 pounds. Joyce stopped Ali in the tenth and final round, snapping his two-fight losing streak. Ali landed face first on the canvas after Joyce connected with a right hand. Ali beat the count, but the referee took a closer look at him and stopped the fight. The time of stoppage was 2:53 of round 10. After the fight, Joyce told Talksport, "I'm up for getting in again, being more active this year and giving some big, entertaining fights." He mentioned potential rematches and how he was open to fighting anywhere.

==== Joyce vs. Chisora ====
On 22 May 2024, it was officially announced that Joyce would face veteran heavyweight and former world title challenger Derek Chisora (34–13, 23 KOs) at The O2 Arena in London, England on 27 July. Frank Warren discussed the fight and called it 'old school' and six years in the making. Upon turning professional, David Haye, who was Joyce's promoter at the time, made several attempts at making the fight, being unsuccessful in the process. By the time the fight would take place, Chisora would have been out of action for 11 months, having last defeated Gerald Washington in August 2023 on the Joshua-Helenius undercard. A week before the event, Chisora admitted he was already looking past Joyce and planning his next steps in boxing, regardless of the result. With this being his 48th professional fight, Chisora wanted to reach 50 professional fights and then to retire. He said it had always been 50, ever since he turned professional. Joyce weighed 281.2 pounds and Chisora stepped on the scales lighter at 256.7 pounds, but nearly 5 pounds heavier than his previous fight. Throughout the build up, Chisora teased Joyce about his stoppage losses to Zhang and at the weigh in, he wore a mask depicting the face of Zhang.

In a back and forth contest, Joyce was dropped in the ninth round, en route to a unanimous decision loss. The scorecards read 96–94, 96–94 and 97–92. Most of the action was back and forth for most the rounds. Joyce took a couple of the earlier rounds. Both landed big shots at the end of round 5. In rounds 7 and 8, Joyce backed up Chisora multiple times and right hands. On one occasion, rocking Chisora. Until round 9, where Chisora landed his knockdown punch. In round 10, Chisora continued to land hard shots which again rocked Joyce. By the end of the fight, both boxers had bruising under their eyes. CompuBox stats showed Joyce was slightly busier in landing 211 of 835 punches thrown, a connect rate of 25.3%, while Chisora landed 192 of his 564 punches thrown. Chisora was more busier to the body landing 44 shots compared to the 11 landed by Joyce.

On 10 December 2024, Joyce spoke broadcaster Darren Rees, "I'm not done yet. I'm still here. I've got some fights lined up. I'm real excited to get back in the ring and show people what I'm made of, and that I'm still here and I can still push it back into the top levels of the division." There was no mention of any potential names, location or date as to when this would be.

==== Joyce vs. Hrgović ====
On 8 February 2025, it was reported by The Ring Magazine, Queensberry Promotions debut card on DAZN would take place on 5 April with the headline bout being Joyce vs. Dillian Whyte (31–3, 21 KOs) in a heavyweight contest. Joyce was already scheduled to fight Patrick Korte on a 1 March card, which would be considered a warm up. Whyte was on a 3 fight win streak. Joyce had only won one in his last four. Two days later the fight card was announced via a press conference in Manchester, with the event taking place at the Co-op Live Arena. There was an awkward exchange during the press conference between Whyte and Joyce, when Whyte called him 'boring'. This was a response to Joyce telling the media that he was going knock Whyte out. Whyte said, "Joe Joyce said he's going to knock me out on the 5th of April – we'll see. Joe Joyce is going to put me to sleep but not by knocking him out because he's f--cking boring. He's the only man I know who can put coffee to sleep. Boring as f--k. Great fighter, but a boring guy… I just come to fight. I never said I was the best fighter in the world but I come to fight. His main defense is to hit until he gets tired," Joyce replied, "It works." After a small back and forth, Whyte noted that Joyce was a nice guy.

On 4 March, TalkSport reported that Whyte had pulled out of the fight with Joyce after picking up an injury in training. Joyce would remain on the card, looking for a new opponent. Croatian contender Filip Hrgović (17–1, 14 KOs) was named as the replacement. Hrgović last fought in June 2024, where he suffered his sole career loss, a stoppage against Daniel Dubois. It was considered a crossroads fight. Ahead of the fight, Joyce spoke to reporters to discuss the calls for him to retire after taking punishment in his recent fights. He responded, "That's all what other people have said, I've never thought about leaving the sport. Well, it's a job and it pays well. I enjoy it, especially winning. I'm a good boxer and I'm in exciting fights for a reason." At the weigh in, Joyce came in at 275.1 pounds. Slightly lighter than his previous fights. Hrgovic weighed 250.6 pounds.

The fight went the full 10-round distance, with Joyce losing the match via unanimous decision. The scorecards read 98–92, 97–93, 96–95 all in Hrgović's favour. Joyce absorbed a lot of punishment throughout the fight whilst moving forward and landing heavy shots of his own. Hrgović came on strong in the second half of the fight, apart from round 7, where he looked defeated in his corner. Joyce failed to take advantage, barely throwing power shots. This allowed Hrgović to come back into the fight and control the final three rounds. Hrgović sustained cuts over each eye, but his corner did a good job in stopping the blood. Hrgović was with world renowned trainer Abel Sanchez for the first time. On three separate occasions Hrgović was warned by the referee for throwing rabbit punches. Joyce landed 140 of 522 punches thrown (26.8%), while Hrgovic was busier landing 253 of his 502 thrown, achieving over 50% connection rate. 206 of punches landed where power shots, compared to the 73 from Joyce.

Having lost four of his last five fights, Joyce was once again asked about the possibilities or retirement. Joyce quickly shut them down saying, "Everyone gets behind a statement, like 'oh his chin' or I've got CTE, all this crap. I've still got my wits about me, I still enjoy myself and there's still plenty of good fights out there." He said when 'it's time', he would retire.

==== Joyce vs. Suslenkov ====
On 8 June 2026, it was announced that Joyce would return to the ring on 11 July, against unbeaten Russian heavyweight Artem Suslenkov (14–0, 9 KOs), in Moscow, on the undercard of Murat Gassiev vs. Tony Yoka. After the fight was announced, Joyce said, “I've spent the last year preparing, training and wanting to be back in the ring.” Suslenkov was described as a dangerous rising contender, coming off a third-round knockout win over Artur Mann earlier in 2026. Joyce lost the fight by stoppage in the 11th round when he signalled he did not want to continue.

In August 2026, Joyce stated that he intended to continue his boxing career despite growing calls for retirement following a run of five defeats in his previous six bouts. Speaking to talkSPORT Boxing, he said he remained "excited to get back in the ring" and was open to discussing future opportunities with potential promoters and opponents. He was currently without a promoter. In September 2026, he told iFL TV, "I want to pick when I retire, when I am financially in a good place, and finish on a high. Right now it's not time for me to retire yet. I'll choose when I want to retire." Joyce stated that he felt he was still learning from his new trainer SugarHill Steward.

== Personal life ==
Joyce made his acting debut as the protagonist in the dark comedy short film The Fall Guys, which premiered on 8 October 2026 at the Marbella International Film Festival. At the age of 40, Joyce was diagnosed with a form of neurodivergence. He stated that his lifelong traits had been commonly misattributed to Chronic Traumatic Encephalopathy (CTE).

== Professional boxing record ==
21 fights	16 wins	5 losses
By knockout	15	3
By decision	1	2

No.	Result	Record	Opponent	Type	Round, time	Date	Location	Notes
21	Loss	16–5	Artem Suslenkov	TKO	11 (12), 2:00	11 Jul 2026	VTB Arena, Moscow, Russia	For vacant WBA International Gold heavyweight title
20	Loss	16–4	Filip Hrgović	UD	10	5 Apr 2025	Co-op Live, Manchester, England	For vacant WBO International heavyweight title
19	Loss	16–3	Derek Chisora	UD	10	27 Jul 2024	The O2 Arena, London, England	
18	Win	16–2	Kash Ali	KO	10 (10), 2:53	16 Mar 2024	Resorts World Arena, Birmingham, England	
17	Loss	15–2	Zhilei Zhang	KO	3 (12), 3:07	23 Sep 2023	Wembley Arena, London, England	For WBO interim heavyweight title
16	Loss	15–1	Zhilei Zhang	TKO	6 (12), 1:23	15 Apr 2023	Copper Box Arena, London, England	Lost WBO interim heavyweight title
15	Win	15–0	Joseph Parker	KO	11 (12), 1:03	24 Sep 2022	Manchester Arena, Manchester, England	Won vacant WBO interim heavyweight title
14	Win	14–0	Christian Hammer	TKO	4 (12), 1:20	2 Jul 2022	Wembley Arena, London, England	Retained WBC Silver and WBO International heavyweight titles
13	Win	13–0	Carlos Takam	TKO	6 (12), 0:49	24 Jul 2021	Wembley Arena, London, England	Retained Commonwealth, WBC Silver and WBO International heavyweight titles
12	Win	12–0	Daniel Dubois	KO	10 (12), 0:36	28 Nov 2020	Church House, London, England	Won British, Commonwealth, WBC Silver, WBO International, and vacant European heavyweight titles
11	Win	11–0	Michael Wallisch	TKO	3 (10), 0:57	25 Jul 2020	BT Sport Studio, London, England	
10	Win	10–0	Bryant Jennings	UD	12	13 Jul 2019	The O2 Arena, London, England	Retained WBA Gold heavyweight title
9	Win	9–0	Alexander Ustinov	TKO	3 (10), 1:55	18 May 2019	Broadhall Way, Stevenage, England	
8	Win	8–0	Bermane Stiverne	TKO	6 (12), 2:20	23 Feb 2019	The O2 Arena, London, England	Retained Commonwealth heavyweight title; Won vacant WBA Gold heavyweight title
7	Win	7–0	Joe Hanks	KO	1 (10), 2:25	1 Dec 2018	Staples Center, Los Angeles, California, US	Won vacant WBA Continental heavyweight title
6	Win	6–0	Iago Kiladze	KO	5 (10), 0:41	30 Sep 2018	Citizens Business Bank Arena, Ontario, California, US	
5	Win	5–0	Ivica Bacurin	KO	1 (10), 1:54	15 Jun 2018	York Hall, London, England	
4	Win	4–0	Lenroy Thomas	KO	2 (12), 2:36	5 May 2018	The O2 Arena, London, England	Won Commonwealth heavyweight title
3	Win	3–0	Donnie Palmer	KO	1 (8), 0:38	17 Mar 2018	York Hall, London, England	
2	Win	2–0	Rudolf Jozic	KO	1 (8), 3:00	16 Feb 2018	York Hall, London, England	
1	Win	1–0	Ian Lewison	TKO	8 (10), 2:35	20 Oct 2017	indigo at The O2, London, England	

== World Series of Boxing record ==
16 fights	14 wins	2 losses
By knockout	7	0
By decision	7	2

No.	Result	Record	Opponent	Type	Round, time	Date	Location	Notes
16	Win	14–2	Brandon Lynch	TKO	1 (5)	3 Mar 2016	York Hall, London, England	
15	Win	13–2	Edgar Ramirez	UD	5	24 Apr 2015	Plaza De Toros San Marcos, Aguascalientes, Mexico	
14	Loss	12–2	Maxim Babanin	SD	5	9 Apr 2015	The Brewery, London, England	
13	Win	12–1	Abdeljalil Abouhamda	UD	5	19 Mar 2015	York Hall, London, England	
12	Win	11–1	Vladan Babic	TKO	1 (5), 2:02	6 Mar 2015	Mangorvetree Convention Center, Sanya, China	
11	Win	10–1	Lenier Pero	SD	5	20 Feb 2015	Ciudad Deportiva, Havana, Cuba	
10	Win	9–1	Mohamed Grimes	TKO	3 (5)	5 Feb 2015	York Hall, London, England	
9	Win	8–1	Viktor Vykhryst	KO	2 (5), 2:55	23 Jan 2015	Acco International Exhibition Center, Kyiv, Ukraine	
8	Win	7–1	Fateh Touaher	TKO	3 (5)	1 Feb 2014	Palasport Piscine Italcementi, Bergamo, Italy	
7	Win	6–1	Ali Kiydin	TKO	5 (5)	7 Dec 2013	Sports Palace, Assisi, Italy	
6	Win	5–1	Milutin Stankovic	UD	5	22 Mar 2013	York Hall, London, England	
5	Loss	4–1	Oleksandr Usyk	UD	5	1 Mar 2013	York Hall, London, England	
4	Win	4–0	Filip Hrgović	SD	5	7 Feb 2013	York Hall, London, England	
3	Win	3–0	Avery Gibson	UD	5	17 Jan 2013	York Hall, London, England	
2	Win	2–0	Philipp Gruener	UD	5	14 Dec 2012	Earl's Court, London, England	
1	Win	1–0	Matteo Modugno	TKO	4 (5), 1:35	23 Nov 2012	The Celtic Manor Resort, Newport, Wales	

== Pay-per-view bouts ==
Date	Fight	Country	Network	Buys	Source(s)
24 September 2022	Joe Joyce vs. Joseph Parker	United Kingdom	BT Sport Box Office		

Sporting positions
Amateur boxing titles
Previous: Anthony Joshua	ABA super-heavyweight champion 2012	Next: Anthony Richardson
Previous: Anthony Richardson	ABA super-heavyweight champion 2014	Next: Frazer Clarke
Regional boxing titles
Preceded by Lenroy Thomas	Commonwealth heavyweight champion 5 May 2018 – September 2019; Vacated	Next: Daniel Dubois
Vacant Title last held by Alexander Povetkin	WBA Continental (Europe) heavyweight champion 1 December 2018 – July 2019; Vacated	Vacant Title next held by David Price
New title	WBA Gold heavyweight champion 23 February 2019 – March 2020; Vacated	Vacant Title next held by Robert Helenius
Preceded by Daniel Dubois	British heavyweight champion 28 November 2020 – July 2022; Vacated	Vacant Title next held by Fabio Wardley
Preceded by Daniel Dubois	Commonwealth heavyweight champion 28 November 2020 – March 2023; Vacated	Vacant Title next held by Fabio Wardley
Preceded by Daniel Dubois	WBC Silver heavyweight champion 28 November 2020 – September 2022; Vacated	Vacant Title next held by Arslanbek Makhmudov
Preceded by Daniel Dubois	WBO International heavyweight champion 28 November 2020 – December 2022; Vacated	Vacant Title next held by Jared Anderson
Vacant Title last held by Agit Kabayel	European heavyweight champion 28 November 2020 – March 2023; Vacated	Vacant Title next held by Agit Kabayel
World boxing titles
New title	WBO heavyweight champion Interim title 24 September 2022 – 15 April 2023	Succeeded by Zhilei Zhang
