= Alen Babić =

Croatian boxer

Personal information
- Nickname: The Savage
- Born: 17 November 1990 (age 36) Pula, Croatia
- Height: 6 ft 1 in (185 cm)
- Weight: Bridgerweight; Heavyweight

Boxing career
- Reach: 74 in (188 cm)
- Stance: Orthodox

Boxing record
- Total fights: 14
- Wins: 12
- Win by KO: 11
- Losses: 2
Medal record
Men's amateur boxing
Representing Croatia
Croatian National Championships
Silver medal – second place	2014 Split	Heavyweight
Silver medal – second place	2015 Sesvete	Heavyweight
Gold medal – first place	2016 Zagreb	Heavyweight
Bronze medal – third place	2017 Zagreb	Heavyweight
Silver medal – second place	2018 Zagreb	Heavyweight

Alen Babić (born 17 November 1990) is a Croatian professional boxer. He has challenged once for the WBC bridgerweight title in 2023. As an amateur, he competed at the 2017 European Championships in the heavyweight event.

== Amateur career ==
Babić took part in the 2014 Croatian National Championship, facing Marino Bajamic in the quarterfinals. He beat Bajamic by RSC, Josip Bepo Filipi by split decision in the semifinals, and Petar Milas by RSC in the finals. He fought twice in the 11th Mustafa Hajrulahović Memorial tournament, beating Erik Tlkanec by split decision, and Pirro Quni by retirement.

Babić participated in the 2015 Croatian National Championship. He beat Petar Milas by a first-round TKO in the quarterfinals, Josip Bepo Filipi by unanimous decision in the semifinals, but lost to Marko Calic in the finals by unanimous decision. In the 2016 Croatian National Championships, he beat Valentin Kajtazi and Toni Filipi by RSC in the quarterfinals and semifinals respectively, before fighting a rematch with Marko Calic in the finals. Babić was more successful in the rematch, winning by split decision.

In his first tournament of 2016, Babić fought in the 43rd Chemiepokal. He defeated Albon Pervizaj by majority decision, and lost to Sadam Magomedov by split decision, earning him the bronze medal. In April 2016, Babič fought Nikolajs Grisunins in the first round of the Olympic qualification tournament. He beat Grisunins by RSC, but lost the quarterfinal bout against Paul Omba Biongolo by RSC in turn.

He lost the opening fight of the 2017 European Boxing Championships, dropping a split decision to Kristiyan Dimitrov.

He won a silver medal in the 2018 Croatian National Championships, beating Luka Pratljacic by unanimous decision in the quarterfinals, but losing by unanimous decision to Toni Filipi in the semifinals. The two of them fought a rematch in the finals of the 2019 Croatian National Championships, with Filipi once again winning, and Babić earning a silver medal. In between these two fights, Babić also participated in the 2019 Slovenia Grand Prix, where he defeated Angelo Gentile by RSC in the semifinals, and Victor Schelstraete by split decision in the finals.

== Professional career ==
Babić made his professional debut in July 2019, against Lazar Stojanović. Babić won the fight by TKO, stopping the Serbian in the second round. In his next two fights, Babić scored a first-round knockout of Morgan Dessaux and a second-round knockout of Ramazi Gogichashvili.

Babić didn't fight in the first half of 2020, due to the COVID-19 pandemic. For his first fight of 2020, Babić was scheduled to fight Shawndell Winters. He won the fight by a second-round TKO. He fought twice more in 2020, scoring third-round TKOs of Niall Kennedy and Tom Little.

On 12 June 2021, Babić fought and defeated Damien Chambers via a third-round KO to improve to 7–0. Babić followed this up with another victory against Mark Bennett on 7 August 2021, claiming victory after Bennett pulled out after the fifth round.

On 31 March 2024, in London, Babić was scheduled to face Steve Robinson. He won the fight by TKO in the sixth round.

Babić faced Johnny Fisher at Copper Box Arena in London, England on 6 July 2024. He lost via 1st-round TKO.

== Professional boxing record ==
14 fights	12 wins	2 losses
By knockout	11	2
By decision	1	0

No.	Result	Record	Opponent	Type	Round	Date	Location	Notes
14	Loss	12–2	Johnny Fisher	TKO	1 (10), 0:36	6 Jul 2024	Copper Box Arena, London, England	
13	Win	12–1	Steve Robinson	TKO	6 (10), 0:54	31 Mar 2024	The O2 Arena, London, England	
12	Loss	11–1	Lukasz Rozanski	TKO	1 (12), 2:10	22 Apr 2023	G2A Arena, Jasionka 953, Rzeszów, Poland	For vacant WBC bridgerweight title
11	Win	11–0	Adam Balski	UD	10	21 May 2022	The O2 Arena, London, England	Won inaugural WBC Silver bridgerweight title
10	Win	10–0	David Spilmont	KO	6 (8), 0:53	18 Dec 2021	AO Arena, Manchester, England	
9	Win	9–0	Éric Molina	KO	2 (8), 2:33	30 Oct 2021	The O2 Arena, London, England	
8	Win	8–0	Mark Bennett	RTD	5 (8), 3:00	7 Aug 2021	Matchroom Headquarters, Brentwood, England	
7	Win	7–0	Damian Chambers	TKO	3 (6), 1:30	12 Jun 2021	Vertu Motors Arena, Newcastle, England	
6	Win	6–0	Tom Little	TKO	3 (8), 2:38	21 Nov 2020	Wembley Arena, London, England	
5	Win	5–0	Niall Kennedy	TKO	3 (8), 0:34	4 Oct 2020	Marshall Arena, Milton Keynes, England	
4	Win	4–0	Shawndell Winters	TKO	2 (8), 2:20	22 Aug 2020	Matchroom Headquarters, Brentwood, England	
3	Win	3–0	Ramazi Gogichashvili	KO	2 (4), 0:43	25 Oct 2019	Allianz Cloud, Milan, Italy	
2	Win	2–0	Morgan Dessaux	KO	1 (4), 0:56	20 Jul 2019	The O2 Arena, London, England	
1	Win	1–0	Lazar Stojanović	TKO	2 (4), 1:19	11 Jul 2019	Stadio Nicola Pietrangeli, Roma, Italy	

== See also ==
- List of male boxers
