= Joseph C. Joyce =

United States Army general

Dr. Joseph Joyce
- Education: University of Florida; University of Alabama
- Known for: Served as a Brigadier General; Being the Executive Associate Vice President of IFAS
- Scientific career
- Workplaces: Institute of Food and Agricultural Sciences; U.S. Army Corps of Engineers

Joseph C. Joyce, executive associate vice president for agriculture and natural resources at the University of Florida is a Jacksonville, Florida native. He earned his B.S. and M.S. degrees from the University of Alabama. He received his Ph.D. from the University of Florida in 1982.

Joyce served as a limnologist with the U.S. Army Corps of Engineers. He was chief of the Corps' nationwide Aquatic Plant Control Operation Support Center and chief of the Natural Resources Management Section of the Corps of Engineers' Jacksonville District. In 1983, he joined the University of Florida's Institute of Food and Agricultural Sciences as director of the UF/IFAS Center for aquatic Plants, building on his background as a trained scientific manager. In 1988, he was appointed director of the UF/IFAS Center for Aquatic and Invasive Plants.

In 1993, Joyce was appointed interim dean for research and in 1994 was named associate vice president for agriculture and natural resources. He continued to serve as interim dean until 1995. He served as associate vice president until February 1998, when he was appointed interim vice president for agriculture and natural resources and served in this capacity until October 1998. In this position, Joyce served as the interim administrative head of IFAS, which includes Florida Agricultural Experiment Station, the Florida Cooperative Extension Service, the College of Agricultural and Life Sciences, the School of forest Resources and Conservation, and portions of the College of Veterinary Medicine. In 1998, Joyce was named executive associate vice president for agriculture and natural resources.

In 2008, he was appointed by Governor Charlie Crist to the Environmental Regulation Commission (ERC). Joyce also joined the Board of Farm Credit of North Florida.

Joyce has held major leadership positions in professional organizations and has served in numerous leadership and governance roles at the University of Florida. He is also a retired Brigadier General, U.S. Army Reserves.

== Education ==
- Bachelor's degree from the University of Alabama
- Master's degree from the University of Alabama
- Doctorate from the University of Florida
