= Mohamed Soltby =

German professional boxer

Personal information
- Nationality: German
- Born: Mohamed Hazuev; 11 September 1991 (age 34) Grozny, Russia
- Height: 6 ft 4 1/2 in (194 cm)
- Weight: Heavyweight

Boxing career
- Reach: 73 in (185 cm)
- Stance: Orthodox

Boxing record
- Total fights: 19
- Wins: 17
- Win by KO: 9
- Losses: 2

Mohamed Soltby (né Hazuev; born 11 September 1991) is a German professional boxer who held the IBF Baltic heavyweight title in 2019.

== Professional boxing record ==
18 fights	16 wins	2 losses
By knockout	9	1
By decision	6	1
By disqualification	1	0

No.	Result	Record	Opponent	Type	Round, time	Date	Location	Notes
18	Loss	16–2	Mirko Tintor	RTD	3 (8), 3:00	7 Sep 2019	Manchester Arena, Manchester, England	
17	Win	16–1	Toni Thes	DQ	4 (10), 2:23	13 Apr 2019	Hansehalle, Lübeck, Germany	Won IBF Baltic heavyweight title; Thes disqualified for repeated use of his knee
16	Win	15–1	Csaba Schrammel	KO	2 (8), 2:30	22 Sept 2018	Work Your Champ Arena, Hamburg, Germany	
15	Win	14–1	Davit Gorgiladze	TKO	1 (8), 1:58	12 May 2018	Nobeo Studios, Cologne, Germany	
14	Loss	13–1	Nathan Gorman	TKO	5 (10), 2:50	11 Nov 2017	Metro Radio Arena, Newcastle, England	For vacant WBC International Silver heavyweight title
13	Win	13–0	Ferenc Zsalek	TKO	1 (8), 1:55	24 Mar 2017	Bowlers Exhibition Centre, Manchester, England	
12	Win	12–0	Zoltan Csala	KO	2 (6), 2:30	14 Oct 2016	Inselparkhalle, Hamburg, Germany	
11	Win	11–0	Andras Csomor	PTS	6	28 May 2016	Saalbau, Frankfurt, Germany	
10	Win	10–0	Laszlo Hubert	TKO	2 (8), 2:11	30 Jan 2016	Huxleys, Berlin, Germany	
9	Win	9–0	David Gegeshidze	PTS	6	31 Oct 2015	Universum Gym, Hamburg, Germany	
8	Win	8–0	Frantisek Kynkal	KO	1 (6), 1:12	3 Oct 2015	Fuerstenwalder Hof, Fürstenwalde, Germany	
7	Win	7–0	Marcel Erler	PTS	6	28 Feb 2015	Boxsporthalle Braamkamp, Hamburg, Germany	
6	Win	6–0	Sven Haselhuhn	RTD	4 (6), 3:00	18 Oct 2014	Boxsporthalle Braamkamp, Hamburg, Germany	
5	Win	5–0	Patrick Linkert	PTS	4	26 Sep 2014	Audi-Centrum, Berlin, Germany	
4	Win	4–0	Marko Angermann	PTS	6	28 Jun 2014	Mehrzweckhalle am Ploggensee, Grevesmühlen, Germany	
3	Win	3–0	Martin Stensky	TKO	1 (4), 2:17	26 Apr 2014	Hansehalle, Lübeck, Germany	
2	Win	2–0	Toma Vlaovic	KO	1 (4), 1:07	15 Mar 2014	Schönberg, Germany	
1	Win	1–0	Goran Milutinovic	KO	3 (4), 1:15	1 Mar 2014	Gildehaus, Lüchow, Germany	
