= Nathan Gorman =

British boxer (born 1996)

Personal information
- Born: 25 June 1996 (age 30) Nantwich, England
- Height: 6 ft 4 1/2 in (194 cm)
- Weight: Heavyweight

Boxing career
- Reach: 73 in (185 cm)
- Stance: Orthodox

Boxing record
- Total fights: 22
- Wins: 19
- Win by KO: 13
- Losses: 3

Nathan Gorman (born 25 June 1996) is a British professional boxer. At regional level, he has challenged twice for the British heavyweight title in 2019 and 2022.

== Early life ==
Gorman was born on 25 June 1996 in Nantwich, Cheshire. He used to playfully spar with his dad as a child and credits his dad with being a big influence on his boxing career, giving his full backing when he chose to take up boxing. Gorman is of Irish Traveller heritage; he is the great-nephew of the undefeated bare-knuckle fighter Bartley Gorman, the 'King of the Gypsies', and the cousin of heavyweight boxers Tyson Fury and Hughie Fury, and light-heavyweight boxer and former Love Island contestant Tommy Fury.

== Amateur career ==
Gorman won the youth ABA in Manchester and the Three Nations in Scotland before joining Team GB where he trained and sparred with Daniel Dubois.

== Professional career ==
=== Early career ===
Gorman made his professional debut, under the tutelage of Ricky Hatton and promoted by Hatton Promotions, on 15 December 2015 against Jindrich Velecky at the Walsall Town Hall, winning via in third round technical knockout (TKO).

In his sixth fight on 1 October 2016, he beat David Howe to win the vacant Central Area heavyweight title.

In July 2017, it was announced that Gorman has signed a promotional contract with Frank Warren's Queensberry Promotions, with his future fights set to be televised on BoxNation and BT Sport.

He stopped Mohamed Soltby in five rounds in November 2017 to win the vacant WBC International Silver title.

=== Gorman vs. Cojanu ===
He retained his title with a unanimous decision (UD) victory over former WBO heavyweight title challenger Răzvan Cojanu in December 2018.

=== Gorman vs. Johnson ===
He defeated former world title challenger Kevin Johnson by UD over ten rounds in March 2019.

=== Gorman vs. Dubois ===
In July 2019, he fought Daniel Dubois for the vacant British heavyweight title, losing by knockout (KO) in the fifth round, his first loss in 17 fights. Dubois was ranked #11 by the WBO at heavyweight at the time.

In his next bout, Gorman fought and defeated Richard Lartey via unanimous decision, winning 100–90, 100–90 and 98–92 on the scorecards.

In his next bout, Gorman defeated Pavel Sour via TKO in the second round.

In his next bout, Gorman beat Tomas Salek by technical knockout in the first round, winning the IBF International title.

=== Gorman vs. Wardley ===
For his next bout, Gorman fought Fabio Wardley for the vacant British heavyweight title. He lost by 3rd round TKO.

== Professional boxing record ==
22 fights	19 wins	3 losses
By knockout	13	2
By decision	6	1

No.	Result	Record	Opponent	Type	Round, time	Date	Location	Notes
22	Loss	19–3	Bohdan Myronets	UD	8	1 Dec 2023	Whites Hotel, London, England	
21	Loss	19–2	Fabio Wardley	TKO	3 (12), 0:32	26 Nov 2022	Wembley Arena, London, England	For vacant British heavyweight title
20	Win	19–1	Tomas Salek	TKO	1 (10), 1:21	18 Jun 2022	Echo Arena, Liverpool, England	Won IBF International heavyweight title
19	Win	18–1	Pavel Sour	TKO	2 (10), 0:39	27 Mar 2021	Copper Box Arena, London, England	
18	Win	17–1	Richard Lartey	UD	10	10 Oct 2020	BT Sport Studio, London, England	
17	Loss	16–1	Daniel Dubois	KO	5 (12), 2:41	13 Jul 2019	The O2 Arena, London, England	For vacant British heavyweight title
16	Win	16–0	Kevin Johnson	PTS	10	23 Mar 2019	Leicester Arena, Leicester, England	
15	Win	15–0	Răzvan Cojanu	UD	12	22 Dec 2018	Manchester Arena, Manchester, England	Retained WBC International Silver heavyweight title
14	Win	14–0	Kamil Sokołowski	PTS	8	20 Oct 2018	Brentwood Centre, Brentwood, England	
13	Win	13–0	Sean Turner	TKO	3 (10), 1:09	9 Jun 2018	Manchester Arena, Manchester, England	
12	Win	12–0	Morgan Dessaux	TKO	2 (8), 1:08	24 Feb 2018	York Hall, London, England	
11	Win	11–0	Mohamed Soltby	TKO	5 (10), 2:50	11 Nov 2017	Metro Radio Arena, Newcastle, England	Won vacant WBC International Silver heavyweight title
10	Win	10–0	Antonio Sousa	TKO	5 (8), 0:45	15 Jul 2017	Winter Gardens, Blackpool, England	
9	Win	9–0	Dominic Akinlade	PTS	10	1 Apr 2017	Crystal Palace National Sports Centre, London, England	
8	Win	8–0	Gogita Gorgiladze	TKO	1 (10), 1:49	18 Feb 2017	Fenton Manor Sports Complex, Stoke, England	
7	Win	7–0	Igor Mihaljević	RTD	3 (6), 3:00	26 Nov 2016	Motorpoint Arena, Cardiff, Wales	
6	Win	6–0	David Howe	TKO	1 (10), 2:27	1 Oct 2016	Fenton Manor Sports Complex, Stoke, England	Won vacant Central Area heavyweight title
5	Win	5–0	Tomas Mrazek	TKO	3 (8), 0:30	2 Sep 2016	Banks's Stadium, Walsall, England	
4	Win	4–0	Kamil Sokołowski	TKO	5 (6), 2:42	14 May 2016	Banks's Stadium, Walsall, England	
3	Win	3–0	Hrvoje Kisicek	TKO	1 (4), 2:48	30 Apr 2016	Copper Box Arena, London, England	
2	Win	2–0	Jakub Wojcik	PTS	4	19 Feb 2016	Town Hall, Walsall, England	
1	Win	1–0	Jindrich Velecky	TKO	3 (4), 1:30	5 Dec 2015	Town Hall, Walsall, England	
