= England Boxing National Amateur Championships =

Boxing competitions

England Boxing National Amateur Championships (previously the ABA Championships)
- Frequency: annual
- Country: England
- Inaugurated: 1881
- Organiser: England Boxing

The England Boxing National Amateur Championships previously known as the ABA Championships is the premier amateur boxing tournament in Great Britain, hosted annually by England Boxing. The Championships are 'open' class: any boxer who is registered with a club registered with England Boxing (aged over 17 years by the 1 October) can enter.

== History ==
The inaugural Championships were held (over one day) on 18 April 1880 at St James Hall, London at four weight categories: Featherweight (57 kg), Lightweight (60 kg), Middleweight (75 kg), and Heavyweight (91 kg). 1884 saw the introduction of a fifth weight category (Bantamweight, 54 kg). In 1920 three additional weight categories were introduced taking it to 8 weight categories in all. These extra weights were: Flyweight (51 kg), Welterweight (69 kg), and Light heavyweight (81 kg).

In 1920, the London ABA was split into four Divisions to accommodate the number of boxers entering the ABA Championships. The start of Divisional Championships. The following year in 1921 the ABA decided to introduce eliminating rounds and the Country was split into four Regions to assist in identifying a champion. In 1926 the Championships were opened by a Patron of the 'ABA', the Prince of Wales.

In 1971, the 'light flyweight' category (48 kg) was included in the National Championship for the first time. In 1982, the 'super heavyweight category (over 91 kg) was added. Cruiserweight (86 kg) was added in 1998.

By 1994, the ABA Championships became a purely English affair as Scottish and Welsh boxers could no longer compete due to disagreements over rules and regulations.

In 2012/3 the weights were revised, deleting light middleweight (71 kg) and cruiserweight (86 kg), also increasing welter weight from 67 kg to 69 kg. So today a total of eleven weight categories are contested. The ABA Champion is automatically selected to represent England in the Four Nations Championship in that year (England, Ireland, Scotland and Wales).

In 2019 the Championships were renamed the England Boxing National Amateur Championships and the 2020 Championships were cancelled due to COVID-19. In 2022, another re-organisation of the weight categories resulted in the light-middleweight division returning.

== Locations ==
The inaugural Championships were held at St James Hall, London on 18 April 1880. In 1926, the Championships moved to the Royal Albert Hall London after moving around different venues within the Capital City (St. James Hall, Alexandra Palace, Northampton Institute, Holborn Central Hall, Royal Aquarium, Her Majesty's Theatre, People's Palace and the Holland Park Ring). From 1946 until 1990 the Championships were held at the Wembley Arena.

Since 1990 the locations have varied.

- 1990–1992 (Royal Albert Hall)
- 1993–1998 (Arena Birmingham)
- 1999–2002 (Metrodome Leisure Centre, Barnsley)
- 2005 (ExCeL London)
- 2004, 2006 (Wembley Conference Centre)
- 2009 (York Hall, London)
- 2011 (Charter Hall, Leisure World, Colchester)
- 2013 (Rainton Meadows Arena, Sunderland)
- 2014–2016 (Echo Arena, Liverpool)
- 2017 (Magna Science Adventure Centre, Rotherham)
- 2003, 2007–2008, 2010, 2012 & 2018 (York Hall, London)
- 2019, 2022 (Manchester Central)
- 2021 (University of East London's SportsDock)
- 2023 (Vertu Motors Arena, Newcastle)
- 2024 (Derby Arena, Derby)
