= 2009 World Amateur Boxing Championships – Super heavyweight =

Boxing competitions

The Super heavyweight competition is the heaviest class featured at the 2009 World Amateur Boxing Championships, and was held at the Mediolanum Forum. Super heavyweights were limited to those boxers weighing over 91 kilograms (200.6 pounds).

== Medalists ==
Gold	Roberto Cammarelle; Italy
Silver	Roman Kapitanenko; Ukraine
Bronze	Viktar Zuyeu; Belarus
Bronze	Zhang Zhilei; China

== Seeds ==
1. (Italy) Roberto Cammarelle (champion)
2. (China) Zhang Zhilei (semifinals)
3. (Cameroon) David Assene (first round)
4. (Kazakhstan) Ivan Dychko (second round)
5. (Belarus) Viktar Zuyeu (semifinals)
6. (Nigeria) Onoriode Ehwarieme (first round)
7. (Israel) Yousef Abed El Ghani (second round)
8. (Cuba) Erislandy Savón Cotilla (quarterfinals)

== Draw ==
=== Finals ===
Quarterfinals
Roberto Cammarelle (ITA)	12
Kubrat Pulev (BUL)	6
Viktar Zuyeu (BLR)	11
Denis Sergeev (RUS)	2
Roman Kapitanenko (UKR)	17
Erislandy Savón Cotilla (CUB)	6
Primislav Dimovski (MKD)	2
Zhang Zhilei (CHN)	6

Semifinals
Roberto Cammarelle (ITA)	RET
Viktar Zuyeu (BLR)
Roman Kapitanenko (UKR)	5
Zhang Zhilei (CHN)	2

Final
Roberto Cammarelle (ITA)	10
Roman Kapitanenko (UKR)	5

=== Top half ===
==== Section 1 ====
Round 1		Round 2		Quarterfinals
Roberto Cammarelle (ITA)	8
Michael Hunter (USA)	1	Roberto Cammarelle (ITA)	14
Rok Urbanc (SLO)	5	Rok Urbanc (SLO)	0
Milutin Stankovic (SRB)	4			Roberto Cammarelle (ITA)	12
Nelson Hysa (ALB)				Kubrat Pulev (BUL)	6
Kubrat Pulev (BUL)	RSC	Kubrat Pulev (BUL)	8
Muhammet Guner (TUR)	3	Yousef Abed Elghani (ISR)	2
Yousef Abed Elghani (ISR)	13

==== Section 2 ====
Round 1
Viktar Zuyeu (BLR)	14
Didier Bence (CAN)	4
Marko Tomasović (CRO)	14
Cathal McMonagle (IRL)	5
Denis Sergeev (RUS)	11
Istvan Bernath (HUN)	6
Dominik Milko (SVK)
Ivan Dychko (KAZ)	RSC

Round 2
Viktar Zuyeu (BLR)	RSC
Marko Tomasović (CRO)
Denis Sergeev (RUS)	15
Ivan Dychko (KAZ)	11

Quarterfinals
Viktar Zuyeu (BLR)	11
Denis Sergeev (RUS)	2

=== Bottom half ===
==== Section 3 ====
Round 1
David Assene (CMR)
Roman Kapitanenko (UKR)	WO
Razvan Cojanu (ROU)	DSQ
Ayaouri Agbonson (TOG)
Ali Khaleel Salman (IRQ)	4
Gilton Benjey Zimmerman (AHO)	11
Andrew Jones (WAL)
Erislandy Savón Cotilla (CUB)	RSC

Round 2
Roman Kapitanenko (UKR)	13
Razvan Cojanu (ROU)	9
Gilton Benjey Zimmerman (AHO)	4
Erislandy Savón Cotilla (CUB)	11

Quarterfinals
Roman Kapitanenko (UKR)	17
Erislandy Savón Cotilla (CUB)	6

==== Section 4 ====
Round 1		Round 2		Quarterfinals
Onoriode Ehwarieme (NGR)	8
Clayton Laurent (ISV)	10	Clayton Laurent (ISV)	0
Primislav Dimovski (MKD)	21	Primislav Dimovski (MKD)	12
Jake Ageidu (NRU)	3			Primislav Dimovski (MKD)	2
Terurio Quinunez (ECU)	3			Zhang Zhilei (CHN)	6
Erik Pfeifer (GER)	11	Erik Pfeifer (GER)	8
Sardor Abdullaev (UZB)	5	Zhang Zhilei (CHN)	12
Zhang Zhilei (CHN)	11

== See also ==
- Boxing at the 2008 Summer Olympics – Super heavyweight
