= Kubrat Pulev =

Bulgarian boxer (born 1981)

Kubrat Pulev Кубрат Пулев
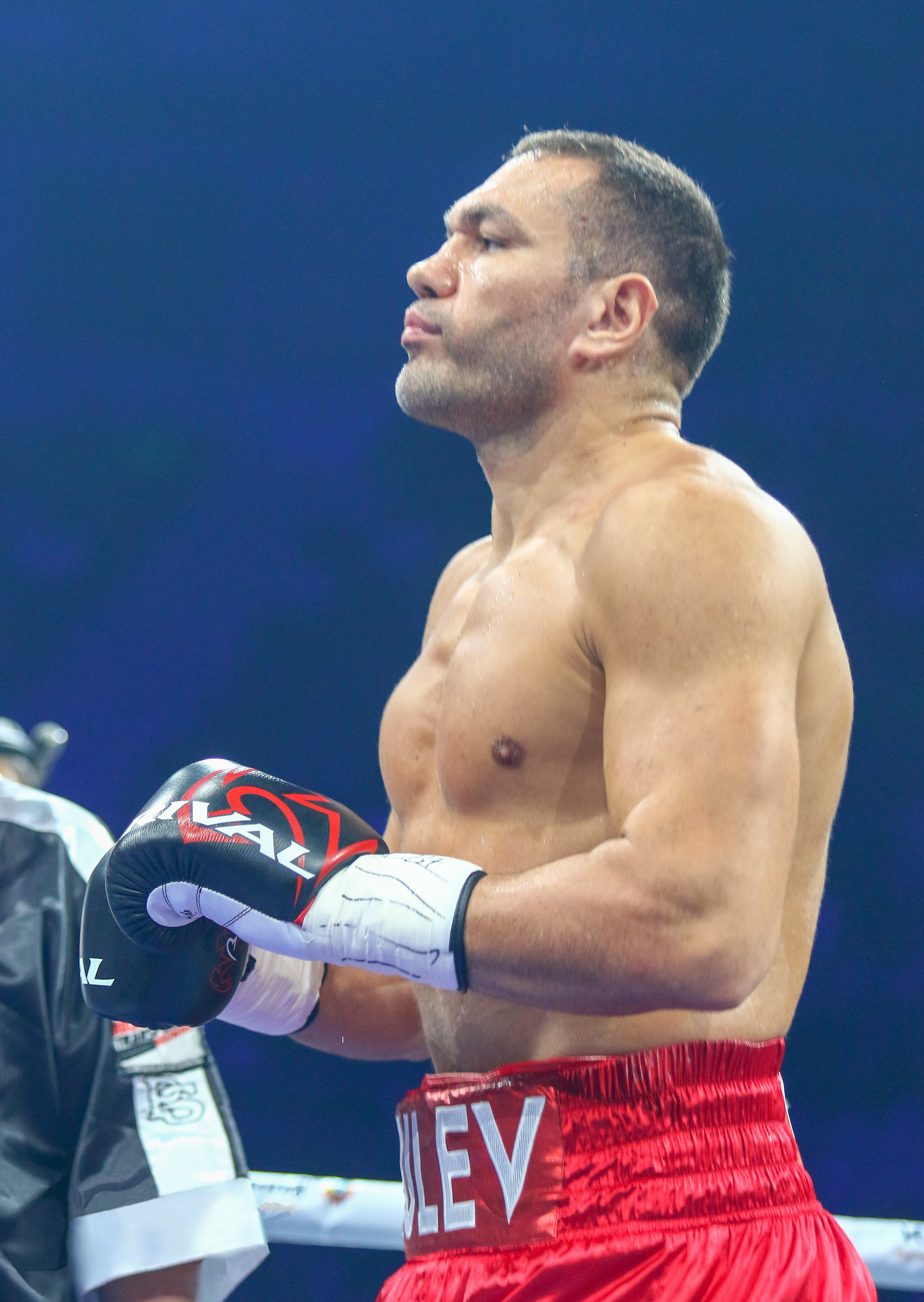
- Pulev in 2018

Personal information
- Nickname: The Cobra
- Born: Kubrat Venkov Pulev; 4 May 1981 (age 45) Sofia, Bulgaria
- Height: 1.94 m (6 ft 4 1/2 in)
- Weight: Heavyweight

Boxing career
- Reach: 202 cm (79 1/2 in)
- Stance: Orthodox

Boxing record
- Total fights: 36
- Wins: 32
- Win by KO: 14
- Losses: 4
- Draws: 0
- No contests: 0
Medal record
Men's amateur boxing
Representing Bulgaria
World Championships
| Bronze medal – third place | 2005 Mianyang | Super-heavyweight |
European Championships
| Bronze medal – third place | 2006 Plovdiv | Super-heavyweight |
| Gold medal – first place | 2008 Liverpool | Super-heavyweight |
European Union Championships
| Gold medal – first place | 2004 Madrid | Heavyweight |
| Silver medal – second place | 2005 Cagliari | Super-heavyweight |
Strandzha Cup
| Silver medal – second place | Plovdiv 2001 | Light-heavyweight |
| Gold medal – first place | Plovdiv 2002 | Heavyweight |
| Gold medal – first place | Plovdiv 2005 | Super-heavyweight |
| Gold medal – first place | Pleven 2006 | Super-heavyweight |
| Gold medal – first place | Plovdiv 2008 | Super-heavyweight |
Bulgarian National Championships
| Gold medal – first place | 2001 Burgas | Heavyweight |
| Gold medal – first place | 2003 Pleven | Heavyweight |
| Gold medal – first place | 2005 Sliven | Super-heavyweight |
| Gold medal – first place | 2008 Pleven | Super-heavyweight |

Kubrat Venkov Pulev (Bulgarian: Кубрат Венков Пулев; born 4 May 1981) is a Bulgarian professional boxer. He held the World Boxing Association (WBA) heavyweight title (Regular version) from 2024 to 2025. At regional level, he has held multiple heavyweight championships, including the European title twice between 2012 and 2016. As an amateur, he won a gold and silver medal at the 2004 and 2005 European Union Championships; bronze at the 2005 World Championships; and bronze and gold at the 2006 and 2008 European Championships. He also represented Bulgaria at the 2008 Olympics.

== Amateur career ==
=== Heavyweight ===
In February 2002, Pulev won the Strandzha Cup in his native Bulgaria. Pulev, who is nicknamed "The Cobra", beat Cuban world champion Odlanier Solís in the process. One month later, he lost a rematch to the Cuban at the semifinal of the Chemiepokal Cup. He could not participate at the Euros 2002 in Perm after breaking his arm in sparring.

At the World Championships 2003, he lost again in the first round to Odlanier Solís 7:12.

At the European boxing championships 2004 in Pula, he defeated world class Alexander Povernov (World Championships Bronze medalist 2005). Pulev did not qualify for the Olympics despite the fact that he won the last qualifying tournament in Gothenburg. He had to settle for the first reserve place because the heavyweight division consists of only 16 fighters participating in the Olympic Games.

=== Super-heavyweight ===
Pulev beat Islam Timurziev at super-heavyweight at the Strandja Cup 2005. At the EU Championships he lost the final 18:24 to Italian southpaw Roberto Cammarelle. At the 2005 World Amateur Boxing Championships he won bronze, losing for the third time to Odlanier Solís 11:25.

In 2006, at the Chemiepokal he beat Vyacheslav Glazkov and Magomed Abdusalamov. He finished at third place at the European Championships in Plovdiv. After defeating Glazkov again he was easily beaten (RSCO) by former victim and eventual winner, Islam Timurziev of Russia.

In 2007. he won the Chemiepokal tournament and was regarded as one of the favorites at the 2007 World Amateur Boxing Championships, but had a bad draw and lost early to southpaw Olympic bronze medalist and eventual winner Roberto Cammarelle.

In 2008, he won the Strandja Cup once again beating PanAm Champion Robert Alfonso 19:9.

He beat Jaroslavas Jakšto and Marko Tomasović to qualify for the Olympics 2008. There he was upset in his first bout by young Colombian Óscar Rivas.

In absence of Roberto Cammarelle, he beat Marko Tomasović, Roman Kapitonenko and Denis Sergeev to claim the European Championship.

At the 2009 World Amateur Boxing Championships he lost again to Roberto Cammarelle.

== Professional career ==
=== Early career ===
Pulev turned professional, at the age of 28, in September 2009 at the Jahnsportforum in Neubrandenburg, Mecklenburg-Vorpommern, Germany. He defeated Florian Benche via 2nd-round technical knockout. Pulev fought another three times in the next three months, winning them all. He ended his first professional year with 4 wins and no losses. Within two years, he built up a record of 14 wins and no losses.

=== First reign as European champion ===
==== Pulev vs. Dimitrenko ====
Pulev got his first title opportunity when it was announced in March 2012 he would fight Alexander Dimitrenko (32–1, 21 KOs) on the Marco Huck vs. Ola Afolabi WBO cruiserweight championship undercard on 5 May in Erfurt, Germany for the vacant EBU European Heavyweight Championship. Many observers were giving both fighters an even chance to win, and expected the winner of this bout to fight for the title in the near future. Some observers expected the fight to bring Dimitrenko back into the title contention. Pulev and his trainer Otto Ramin expected a tough fight although Dimitrenko had not fought since September 2011. Pulev was outweighed by 12 pounds at the weigh in, coming in at 245 pounds. Dimitrenko started the fight well, using his height and reach to his advantage. He also moved well on his feet to avoid punishment. In round 4, Pulev began to find his range and began countering and landing some power punch combinations of his own, rocking Dimitrenko at times. Pulev's punches were much more effective than his opponents. Dimitrenko looked faded as he entered round 11. Pulev landed a jab which slowly dropped Dimitrenko to a knee. At this point, he had taken much punishment and remained down. Referee Guido Cavalleri counted him out, giving Pulev an 11th-round KO win.

==== Pulev vs. Ustinov ====
On 1 August 2012, it was announced that Pulev would defend his European and IBF International heavyweight titles against unbeaten Belarus boxer Alexander Ustinov (27–0, 21 KOs) on 29 September in Hamburg. At the time, due to being the EBA heavyweight champion, Ustinov was not ranked by the EBU. Ustinov vacated the title and the EBU confirmed he would be included in September's rankings. The fight was also set to be an IBF eliminator. Ustinov weighed in over 300 pounds on the scales. Pulev dominated the fight from the opening bell working well behind his jab and landing the harder shots. Pulev maintained the balance attack and landed more punches in round 11. Ustinov, after a slow reaction, took a knee and eventually counted out.

By early-June 2013, the IBF had finally updated its heavyweight division rankings, making Pulev the official #1 contender for its heavyweight title.

On 21 June, the EBU confirmed Alexander Dimitrenko as Pulev's mandatory challenger. They set the purse bid deadline for 10 July. On 18 July, Dimitrenko vacated his mandatory position. The EBU announced that Pulev would fight the next highest ranked fighter instead.

=== Rise up the ranks ===
==== Pulev vs. Thompson ====
Having not fought in 11 months, Pulev next fought on 24 August 2013, against former world title challenger Tony Thompson (38–3, 26 KOs) in a final eliminator in Schwerin, Germany. Thompson was coming off back to back wins against British contender David Price. The fight went the 12 round distance with Pulev announced the winner. The three judges scored the fight 116–112, 118–110, and 117–111 in his favour. Thompson started off slow and defensive, but never landed anything of note during the fight. Pulev outlanded Thompson 80–28 in the final four rounds. In total, Pulev landed 145 of 405 punches thrown (36%) and Thompson connected 141 of his 419 thrown (34%).

On 8 October, EBU announced Pulev as their mandatory challenger for heavyweight champion Derek Chisora. Prior to Pulev vacating the title, Chisora was his mandatory challenger, before capturing the vacant title. There was no date set for purse bids.

==== Pulev vs. Abell ====
On 3 December, it was announced that Pulev would 'stay busy', whilst waiting for the Klitschko fight, and fight on 14 December against veteran Sherman Williams (36–13–2, 19 KO's) at the Jahnsportforum in Neubrandenburg. A few days before the fight, Williams pulled out of the fight with an injury and replaced with American Joey Abell (29–6, 28 KOs). Pulev won the bout when Abell retired in his corner after round 4. Pulev started the fight slow with Abell landing counters, however Pulev found his rhythm in round 2. Abell started well in round 4, dropping Pulev with a counter punch. Pulev got up immediately and dropped Abell three times in the round, all from body shots. During the interval, referee Charlie Fitch stopped the fight.

=== First heavyweight title challenge ===
Starting the year 2014, whilst still waiting on the world title fight with Klitschko, who was due to satisfy his WBO mandatory in April against Alex Leapai, Pulev stated he would fight again in Rostock on 5 April. A month later, talks resumed for a fight between Pulev and Chisora. A purse bid date was set for 18 March. The fight would also serve as a WBO eliminator for Klitschko, despite Pulev already being IBF #1 ranked. Pulev later confirmed that he would fight American boxer Elijah McCall (12–3, 11 KOs) on the Braehmer vs. Maccarinelli undercard. Elijah was known for being the son of former WBC heavyweight champion Oliver McCall. A day later, McCall pulled out of the fight. Sauerland Event stated, "after agreeing 2 fight & docs being received. McCall watched tape of Pulev and pulled out of undercard bout." American Joey Dawejko was announced as the replacement. A day later, Ivica Perkovic (20–23, 15 KOs) replaced Dawejko, who also withdrew from the bout. On fight night, Pulev stopped Perkovic in three rounds.

==== Pulev vs. Klitschko ====
The IBF finally ordered Wladimir Klitschko vs. Pulev on 8 May 2014, and given 30 days negotiation period. Klitschko's manager Bernd Boente stated that a potential fight with WBC champion Bermane Stiverne was their main priority, a fight which would see all of the heavyweight belts at stake. Kalle Sauerland stated that he would request to get Klitschko (62–3, 52 KOs) stripped of the IBF title if he didn't fight Pulev. At the same time Deontay Wilder was named Stiverne's mandatory and the WBC stated he must fight Wilder next. With IBF purse bid split being 75–25 in favour of the champion, Klitschko requested the split be 80–20 in his favour. The IBF accepted the request. A purse bid took place on 17 June, which was won by K2 Promotions. The winning bid was $7.25 million. Sauerland Event put in a bid for $5.29 million. As per the bid, K2 had the location set as O2 World Arena in Hamburg, with a possible date being 6 September 2014. In August, Klitschko suffered a bicep injury, thus postponing the fight by at least two months. A new date of 15 November was set. HBO announced that they would air the fight live in the afternoon, making it the 19th Klitschko fight they would show. Two days before the fight, it was revealed only the IBF title would be at stake for Pulev as he and his team, however if Klitschko loses, the remaining titles would be vacated. Despite making a spirited effort, Pulev suffered three knockdowns en route to being knocked out in round five by a devastating left hook. The time of stoppage was recorded as 2:11 of round 5. In the post-fight, Pulev said, "Wladimir is a really good opponent, but he was lucky. I want a rematch". Klitschko praised Pulev, calling him a tough competitor. CompuBox stats showed that Klitschko landed 38 of 89 punches thrown (43%), this included 47% of his power punches. Pulev managed to land only 25 of his 110 thrown (23%). This was made up of 10 jabs and 15 power shots landed. The fight drew 9.16 million viewers in Germany and 1.8 million viewers in Bulgaria (becoming the most watched sports event on the Bulgarian TV since 2007). The fight also averaged 620,000 viewers on HBO and peaked at 700,000 viewers.

=== Back to winning ways ===
Pulev signed a contract extension with Team Sauerland on 11 February 2015. it was also revealed that Pulev would now be trained by well known German coach Ulli Wegner.

Following his first professional defeat, Pulev took 11 months out, before returning to the ring on 17 October 2015, against 41-year-old journeyman George Arias (56–13, 42 KOs) in an 8-round bout. The fight was scheduled to take place at the DM-Arena in Karlsruhe, Baden-Württemberg. Pulev also announced that he would be working with German legendary coach Wegner. The fight went the distance as Pulev won a unanimous decision with scores of 80–71, 80–71, and 79–73.

His next fight took place in December 2015 against American journeyman and former USBA heavyweight champion Maurice Harris, the fight lasted all of 100 seconds as Pulev knocked Harris down and out.

==== Pulev vs. Chisora ====
On 15 March 2016, it was announced that Pulev would fight fellow former European champion and world title challenger Derek Chisora (25–5, 17 KOs), in an IBF title eliminator for the vacant European heavyweight title at the Barclaycard Arena in Hamburg on 7 May 2016. Despite what had seemed a fairly comfortable points win for Pulev, which saw him control the fight behind the jab, the fight ended in a split decision, with two judges scoring it 118–110 and 116–112 in Pulev's favour while the third scored it 115–113 for Chisora.

==== Pulev vs. Peter ====
On 1 November 2016, it was announced that Pulev would fight returning former heavyweight world champion Samuel Peter (36–5, 29 KOs) on 3 December at the Arena Armeec in Sofia, Bulgaria. It was the first time in his professional career fighting in his home country. On 22 November, Pulev decided to vacate the EBU title instead entering purse bids against mandatory Mariusz Wach. Peter weighed 271 pounds for the fight. In front of 15,000 at the Arena Armeec, Pulev defeated Peter via a 3rd-round RTD to win the vacant WBA Inter-Continental heavyweight title. The fight was stopped after round three when Peter was forced to retire after dislocating his right shoulder. Pulev was the more accurate and active boxer and managed to land the clear punches. He was ahead 30–27 on all three judges' scorecards after round 3.

==== Pulev vs. Johnson ====
On 21 March 2017, Team Sauerland announced that Pulev would once again return to the Arena Armeec in Sofia, Bulgaria against former world title challenger Kevin Johnson (30–7–1, 14 KOs) of the United States. Johnson made a return to boxing, following his first knockout loss to Anthony Joshua in 2015, on 11 March in an eight-round unanimous decision win against Jamal Woods. The fight took place on 28 April 2017. The fight went 12 rounds, but inflicted with foul play. Pulev controlled all the rounds winning 120–108 on two judges cards and 119–109 on the third judges card. Pulev got away with rabbit punching throughout the fight. In round 8, referee Terry O’Connor warned Pulev, however he continued to do so. Johnson fought on the back foot, although he hit Pulev with some clean shots, it wasn't enough to win the rounds. The win kept Pulev in line for a future IBF world title shot, winning his fifth consecutive fight since his sole loss to Wladimir Klitschko and also retaining his WBA Inter-Continental heavyweight title.

==== Cancelled world title fight ====
On 10 December 2016, Anthony Joshua knocked out Eric Molina in the third round and the Joshua vs. Klitschko fight was officially announced. WBA president Gilberto J. Mendoza confirmed that the winner will have to face mandatory challenger Luis Ortiz next, with deadlines due to be set after the unification fight. A day later the IBF announced the winner must fight their mandatory challenger Pulev. Because of this clashing with the WBA enforcing their mandatory, it was believed that either Joshua or Klitschko would have to vacate a title. On 7 June 2017, the IBF granted Joshua an exception for him to rematch Klitschko instead of fighting mandatory challenger Pulev. At this point, it was not said that the rematch would take place. Klitschko said he needed time to review his situation before agreeing to a rematch. It was only weeks after the fight, when Eddie Hearn filed the paperwork to the IBF to request the exception to the mandatory defense. IBF explained that the rematch must take place no later than 2 December 2017, and the winner must fight Pulev next with no exceptions.

On 3 August 2017, Klitschko announced on his website and social media channels that he was retiring from boxing. On 4 August, upon learning that Klitschko had retired, the IBF immediately ordered Joshua and Pulev to fight next, with a deal needing to be reached by 3 September 2017. The WBA then ordered Joshua to make his mandatory defence against their top ranked fighter Luis Ortiz, giving them 30 days to reach a deal. According to Hearn, the plan going forward was to fight Pulev next, following by Ortiz and then a potential unification fight against Deontay Wilder. On 22 August, details between the camps of Joshua and Pulev were being discussed and close to being finalised for the date of 28 October 2017, with Las Vegas as the potential host.

On 28 August, it was announced that Joshua and Pulev would fight at the Principality Stadium in Cardiff. Promoter Eddie Hearn made the official announcement on 5 September, "I'm delighted that we will be in Cardiff at the magnificent Principality Stadium for the next step of the AJ journey. Nearly 80,000 will gather on 28 October to create another unforgettable night of boxing. Anthony will meet his mandatory challenger, [IBF] No. 1-ranked Kubrat Pulev, and the card will be stacked with world championship action, domestic title fights and the very best young stars in the game. Get ready for the next episode from the biggest star in world boxing." The official press conference took place on 11 September and the following day, a reported 70,000 tickets had been sold, making it the fastest selling event. It also set the record of largest boxing attendance to be expected indoors. The previous record was Muhammad Ali vs. Leon Spinks rematch which gathered 63,000 fans at the New Orleans Superdrome in 1978. On 16 October, rumours circulated that Pulev had suffered an injury, which could see the fight being in jeopardy. The same reports suggested the injury was 10 days old, but Pulev's camp had kept it quiet. The injury was later revealed to be true and 36-year-old Carlos Takam (35–3–1, 27 KOs), who was ranked number 3 by the IBF stepped in to replace Pulev on 12 days notice. Eddie Hearn said in a statement that he received a phone call from Pulev's promoter Kalle Sauerland, advising him of a shoulder injury he sustained during sparring. Hearn revealed when the Joshua vs. Pulev fight was made, he reached out to Takam's camp, knowing they would be next in line and told them to begin a training camp and stay on standby.

==== Pulev vs. Hughie Fury ====
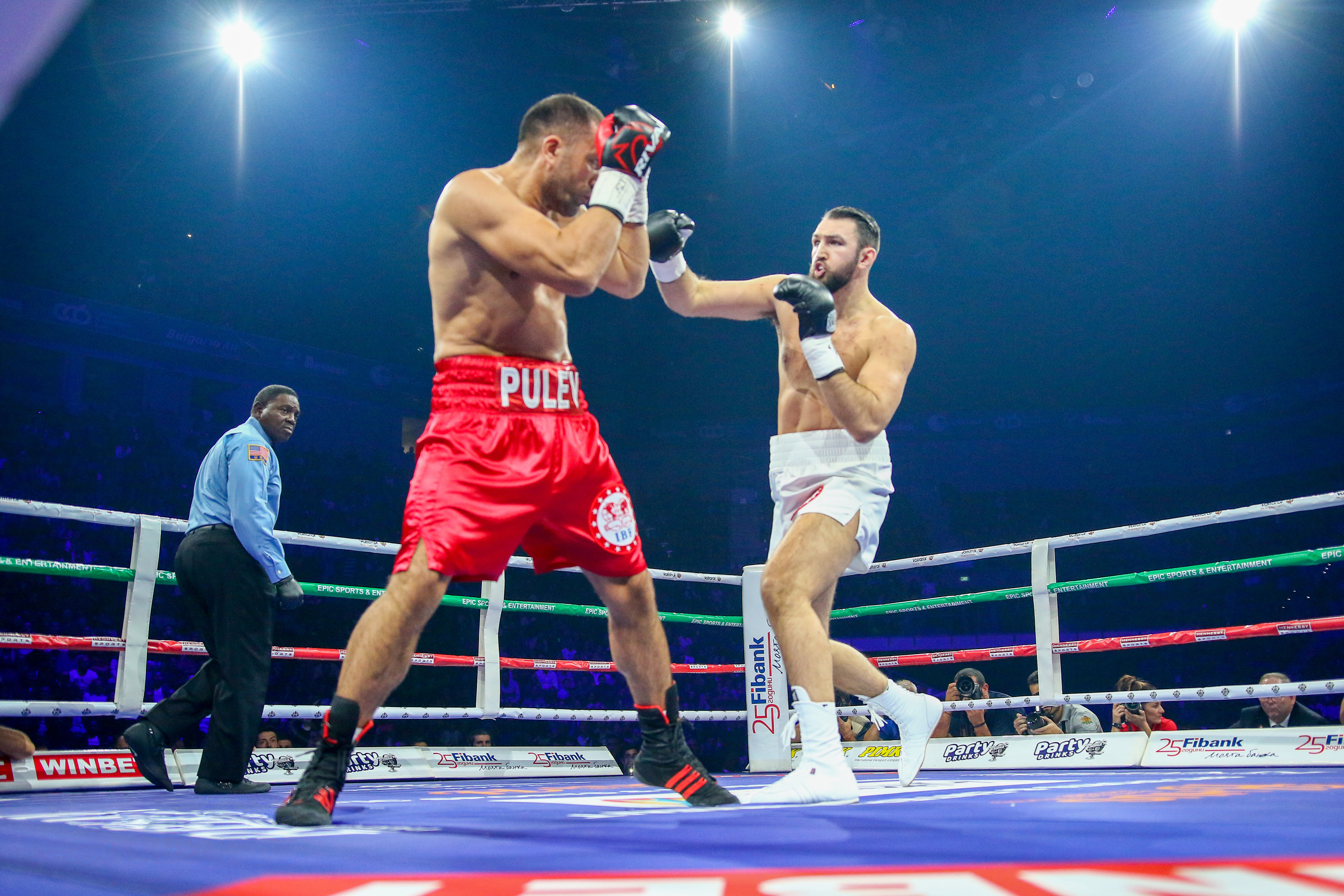
Pulev (left) vs. Hughie Fury

In March 2018, the IBF ordered Pulev vs. Dominic Breazeale for a final eliminator, however Breazeale refused to take part. In April, the IBF ordered Pulev to fight British boxer Dillian Whyte (23–1, 17 KOs). A purse bid was set for 10 May. The purse bids were delayed as a deal between Eddie Hearn and Team Sauerland, Pulev's promoter was close to being agreed. The IBF gave them until 24 May. Despite Whyte stating that Pulev did not want the fight, Pulev stated he was more than happy to fight Whyte, but "a lot of things need to be agreed" before the fight could be confirmed. According to Nisse Sauerland, the date of 28 July was being discussed with the host venue being either London or Bulgaria. New York based promotional company, Epic Sports & Entertainment made a purse bid of $1,500,111, winning the rights of the fight. Hearn offered $831,111, which was higher than the $801,305 bid from Team Sauerland. IBF ruling states for a final eliminator, the higher ranked boxer, in this case was Pulev, would get 75% ($1,125,083.25) and Whyte would earn $375,027.75 for the fight. On 7 June, Whyte pulled out of the fight and instead Matchroom announced he would be fighting former WBO champion Joseph Parker in London on 28 July. Pulev was unhappy with the pull out and labelled Whyte and Hearn as 'extreme manipulators and plain schizophrenics' as well as accusing them of avoiding him at all costs.

On 16 June, the IBF then ordered Pulev against their #3 ranked American boxer Jarrell Miller 21–0, 18 KO). On 25 June, at the purse bid, Epic Sports & Entertainment made the winning bid of $2,111,111, much higher than the $1,000,010, which was placed by Team Sauerland. The bid meant Miller would be earning his highest purse at $527,777.75 US dollars. According to Epic Sports, the contracts were sent within two days of the purse bid. By 2 July, there was no deal made. It was said that Miller's camp were stalling, likely due to the fight taking place in Bulgaria. Miller's promoter Dmitry Salita confirmed negotiations were still ongoing however the biggest hurdle was the venue. According to IBF public relations director Jeanette Salazar, Miller had 15 days from when he received the contract to agree or the IBF would go back to the rankings. At the time, the next highest challenger was Hughie Fury (21–1, 11 KO), who was inserted at No. 5 by the IBF in June. Negotiations between Pulev and Miller broke down on 10 July. The IBF ordered a purse bid to take place on 9 August. On the morning, the IBF pushed the date of the bid to 16 August. However, on that same date, the fight was agreed from both parties and was announced to take place in Sofia, Bulgaria on 27 October 2018.

Pulev defeated Fury via a 12-round unanimous decision to become the mandatory challenger for IBF heavyweight title. The scores were 117–111, 118–110, and 115–113. After a good start by Fury, he could not overcome a cut that opened up in round 2, which altered his mindset and game plan. Fury had suffered the cut over his left eye during training camp and Pulev took advantage by opening it up again. With the cut bleeding bad, it forced Hughie to fight more aggressively but cautiously. After the fight, Peter Fury said, "Hughie came into the fight with a cut above the eye. He was stitched up two weeks ago but they [the doctors] said it would heal in time for the fight and obviously it didn’t." He praised Fury for his efforts after the cut was open. Pulev used his jab often, until round 4, he started unloading on more power shots. Fury spent the majority of the second half of the fight trying to counter Pulev, however was unable to land any meaningful shot. As the fight went on, Pulev's jab became much stronger and accurate, although Pulev was caught with a right hand in round 8. Pulev clinched after being wobbled and took back control in round 9. By round 11, Fury seemed tired and spent most of the final two rounds boxing with his back against the ropes. Fury believed the cut was what ultimately lost him the fight.

=== Signing with Top Rank ===
==== Pulev vs. Dinu ====
On 8 December 2018, Top Rank announced they had signed Pulev on a co-promotional multiyear deal. Bob Arum revealed the plan for 2019 was to have Pulev main event a card on ESPN against a known, in preparation for a future Anthony Joshua showdown. Arum had been interested in signing Pulev since they made a deal with Epic Sports to broadcast Pulev's fight against Hughie Fury on ESPN+.

On 27 February 2019, it was announced that Pulev would risk his IBF #1 ranking, with a fight against Bogdan Dinu (18–1, 14 KOs), over ten rounds, on 23 March at The Hangar in Costa Mesa, California. Dinu saw this as an opportunity to get into the heavyweight title mix, after coming off a stoppage loss to Jarrell Miller. The fight aired live on ESPN. Speaking ahead of the fight, not looking past Dinu, Pulev admitted he wanted revenge on Oscar Rivas, after losing to him at the 2008 Beijing Olympics. The fight was Pulev's first in the United States in 12 years, having taken part in the 2007 World Amateur Championships tournament in Chicago, Illinois.

Pulev defeated Dinu by technical knockout in the seventh round, overcoming a severe cut to dominate the fight and secure a win. They both started off testing their jabs during the early rounds, being cautious. Dinu landed a right hand followed by a left hook, which caused a severe cut above Pulev's left eye. Blood immediately began to pour down his face. Despite this, Pulev, with experience on his side, maintained composure. His cutman, Rudy Hernandez, managed the wound well to keep Pulev in the fight. Before the fifth round, the ringside doctor assessed Pulev and allowed the fight to continue. After the cut, Pulev experienced a heightened sense of urgency and increased his offense with combinations and overhand rights. The end came in the seventh round. Dinu was knocked down multiple times. Once following a right hand against the ropes, then by a barrage of shots. During one of the knockdowns, Pulev accidentally hit Dinu at the back of the head. He was deducted a point, and the fight continued after a short pause. Pulev landed an overhand right, which ended the fight at 2:40 of the round. Following the fight, Pulev stated the cut motivated him, “It was not a big problem, this cut. I was able to fight and sometimes the blood just makes you very hungry.”

The card garnered an average of 469,000 viewers, marking the lowest prime-time viewership for a Top Rank boxing event on ESPN since their exclusive deal began in June 2017.

On 1 April, Dinu and his team filed a formal protest with the California State Athletic Commission, disputing the legality of the knockout due to the illegal punch. Two possible outcomes they were looking for was either a disqualification loss for Pulev or a no-contest. One of the key specifics mentioned by Dinu's promoter, was one of the rabbit punches landed when Dinu was already on his knees. The petition referenced rule 4 CCR – 368 of the Official California Code of Regulations, which allowed the commission to change a fight's verdict if violations of laws or regulations affected the outcome. A hearing took place on 14 May 2019. The knockout win for Pulev was upheld. CSAC ruled in favor of referee Raul Caiz Jr., applying California state rules rather than ABC unified rules because the fight was a 10-round non-title bout. Pulev did receive disciplinary action and a suspension for forcibly kissing online reporter Jenny “SuShe” Ravalo during a post-fight interview. The incident went viral, prompting CSAC Executive Director Andy Foster to suspend his boxing license immediately. Pulev's appeal to lift the suspension was denied and was scheduled to appear before the CSAC for a review on 22 July 2019.

==== Pulev vs. Booker ====
Since signing with Top Rank, there was talks of a collision course between Pulev and Tyson Fury, who was co-promoted by the same company. Pulev's main objective was focusing on his IBF mandatory status and challenging Anthony Joshua. Fury had a planned fight against Otto Wallin in September 2019 and spoke to the Irish Mirror, claiming many top contenders had refused to fight him, one of them being Pulev. Pulev denied avoiding the fight, accusing Fury of using his name and those of other unavailable boxers for publicity and as a distraction from facing lesser-known opponents. Pulev then claimed that Fury was actually 'scared' to fight him a few years ago, despite being available at that time.

In September 2019, it was rumoured that Pulev would take a stay-busy fight, whilst waiting on the winner of Joshua's rematch with Ruiz, against journeyman Mark De Mori on 9 November on ESPN+. De Mori, who was known for his notable stoppage loss to David Haye in 2016, was on a 7-fight win streak, against mostly lower level opposition. On 7 October, it was reported that Pulev would no longer fight De Mori, and instead fight Rydell Booker (26–2, 13 KOs) on undercard of the Jamel Herring vs. Lamont Roach Jr. in Fresno, California at the Chukchansi Park. The fight, like any other, was risky for Pulev, as a loss would mean he would lose his mandatory status. Bob Arum was confident Pulev would challenge for the world title in early 2020. For the scheduled 10-round bout, Pulev weighed 248.4 pounds and Booker scaled in at 248.2 pounds.

In what was described as a slow-paced fight that lacked action, Pulev defeated Booker via unanimous decision. Booker started off aggressively, taking the first round. Pulev started slow but began taking control of the bout after the second round. He was able to break through Booker's defence using his jab, opening up some small cuts. Majority of the fight saw Pulev stay at a distance, using his jab. In the eighth round, Pulev thew more right hands, but remained composed and strategic. The three judges scored the fight 98–92, 98–92, and 99–91, all in favor of Pulev, preserving his status as IBF's top contender. Pulev believed he dominated the fight, saying, "I showed everyone I’m at the world level, and I must fight the winner of Joshua and Ruiz.”

=== Second heavyweight title challenge ===
==== Pulev vs. Joshua ====
On 2 March 2020, both Matchroom's Eddie Hearn and Top Rank's Bob Arum officially announced Pulev as the IBF mandatory challenger, will fight Anthony Joshua at the Tottenham Hotspur Stadium in London on 20 June 2020. On 7 March, before the broadcast of Adam Kownacki vs. Robert Helenius, Joe Goossen announced he will be training Pulev for the fight. It was announced on 3 April 2020 that the fight had been postponed due to the COVID-19 pandemic. The fight took place in front of a crowd of 1,000 people (due to COVID restrictions) at the SSE Arena, Wembley on 12 December 2020. Both fighters began cautiously in the first round, attempting to find each other's range. However, Joshua came out aggressively in the third round and forced Pulev into taking a standing count as he had turned his back on the Briton. When the fight resumed Joshua looked for the knockout and knocked Pulev down with an uppercut late in the round. Pulev beat the count and was able to hold off the champion until the bell. Despite the two knockdowns, Pulev recovered well enough to win the fourth round on some scorecards. The fight continued until the ninth round, where Joshua knocked the Bulgarian down for a third time with a "barrage of uppercuts". Pulev was once again able to continue fighting, however he was immediately hit with a right hand that knocked him out, giving Joshua the victory via ninth-round knockout.

=== Career from 2022–2024 ===
On 11 March 2022, a press release from Triller announced that Pulev was scheduled to fight Andrey Fedosov (32–3, 26 KOs) in a 10-round bout at the Forum in Los Angeles on 14 May, exclusively on FITE, on the undercard of Sergey Kovalev vs. Tervel Pulev. On 4 April, 34-year-old Jerry Forrest (26–4–2, 20 KOs) replaced Fedosov, who withdrew from the event. Pulev weighed 248.5 pounds and Forrest came in lighter at 233 pounds. Prior to the fight, there was a 90-minute delay backstage. Forrest's glove would not fit properly. The CSAC then requested him to remove his hand wraps, but this did not make a difference. After prolonged negotiation, Forrest was allowed to use Pulev's backup pair of Grant gloves, which were notably large. The delay caused frustration among fans in the arena, who began to boo both boxers as they made their ring entrances. Pulev defeated Forrest by unanimous decision after 10 rounds. The fight was one-sided and slow, with Pulev dominating, regularly landing right hands. Forrest showed toughness but was often clumsy and outmatched. From the fourth round, Pulev had taken control of the fight. The ring doctor checked Forrest before the eighth round and cleared him to continue. Forrest began leaning defensively on the ropes, showing limited offense. In the ninth, Forrest landed a straight left, causing a cut above Pulev's left eye. Forrest attempted a late push in the closing rounds, with some success in staggering Pulev mid-round, but at this stage, it was not enough to win the fight. The three judges scored the bout 98–92, 99–91, and 99–91 in favor of Pulev. Pulev landed 120 punches from 551 thrown (22%), while Forrest landed 98 from 494 (20%).

==== Pulev vs. Chisora II ====
After weeks trying to find an opponent, on 7 June, Matchroom Boxing announced Derek Chisora (32–12, 23 KOs) would headline once again at The O2 Arena in London streaming live on DAZN in a rematch against Pulev on 9 July 2022 for the vacant WBA International heavyweight title. Pulev won their first encounter via split decision in 2016. Since their first meeting, Chisora had won 7 of his last 14 bouts. As the fight was announced, fans took to social media to express their dissatisfaction in the fight, with some still calling for Chisora to retire following his recent form. Some were looking forward to Adam Kownacki, who didn't sign the contract, being named as Chisora's opponent. Hearn defended his decision to put the fight on. He explained Chisora being a fan-favourite and still being able to put on fan-friendly fights was the reason he kept getting fights. He did admit however, the headline acts would slowly diminish if Chisora continued to take losses. The pair had a heated face-off at the final press conference. It started off with a handshake and ended with then clashing their heads together, with neither attempted to break. The security then had to intervene. At the weigh-in, which took place at Canary Wharf's East Wintergarden, Chisora wore a mask of Boris Johnson, who recently resigned as Prime Minister of United Kingdom. Chisora weighed 258 pounds and Pulev checked in at 250 pounds.

In front of a reported 7,000 fans in attendance, Chisora defeated Pulev via split decision with one judge scoring it 116–112 in favour of Pulev and the other two scoring it 116–112 and 116–114 in favour of Chisora. The fight was described as thrilling, punishing and gruelling and possible fight of the year contender. Chisora attacked the body a lot throughout. He also landed a lot of overhand right to Pulev's head. Pulev's chin held up and he absorbed a lot of the shots. As the fight went on, Chisora began to tire and Pulev looked the fresher of the two. He landed uppercuts of his own. Despite being badly cut over goth eyes, Pulev continued to come forward and throw shots. Chisora looked tired during the second half of the fight and spent time covering up against the ropes.

The consensus was the fight was close and could have gone either way. According to CompuBox, Chisora landed 171 punches of his 526 thrown (32.5%), with 102 of them landing to Pulev's body, who landed 200 of his 796 thrown (25.1%). Both landed 133 power shots apiece. It was Chisora's 86 power shots to the body that was the difference and more accurate punches came from Chisora also. After the fight Chisora told his promoter Eddie Hearn that he wanted to fight former WBC champion Deontay Wilder next. Chisora said he did not want easy fights and admitted he was not far off retiring, "I last won a fight three years ago… I'm happy today but at the same time I'm sad. I don't have many left in me but what I do have I will give my all to you guys. I don't have many left, so my next couple of fights... I'm on my way out." Chisora was praised on social media by many boxing personalities.

==== Pulev vs. Wawrzyk, Shevadzutskyi ====
On 3 December 2023, Pulev was announced to make a ring return at The Hangar in Costa Mesa, during the 13th year of Fight Club OC on 14 December. His opponent was Chicago-based Polish boxer Andrzej Wawrzyk (34–2, 20 KOs). The fight was scheduled for 10-rounds, with Pulev scoring two knockdowns, en route to winning a wide decision. Pulev controlled the bout from the opening bell, using his trademark jab and aggressive pressure to push Wawrzyk on the defence. Wawrzyk struggled to attack and only fought in sporadic bursts, remaining defensive. This allowed Pulev to be dominant. The first knockdown was in the sixth round following a left hand, which landed at the back of Wawrzyk's head. The second knockdown occurred in the eighth, with a powerful right hand, pushing Wawrzyk into the ropes. The judges scored the fight 100–88, 100–88, and 99–89 in favor of Pulev.

For Pulev's next fight, he returned to Sofia at the Arena Armeec on 30 March 2024. His opponent was Ukrainian boxer Ihor Shevadzutskyi (11–1, 9 KOs), with the WBA International heavyweight title on the line. Shevadzutskyi stepped up on a week's notice after the original opponent, WBA 'regular' champion Mahmoud Charr (34–4, 20 KOs), pulled out due to an injured bicep. Pulev weighed 248.5 pounds and Shevadzutskyi weighed 286.5 pounds. Pulev claimed victory via unanimous decision, with all three judges scoring the fight 117–111. Pulev controlled the fight with his experience and technique, outboxing Shevadzutskyi over 12 rounds. They both began cautiously, with Pulev using his reach advantage to land jabs. Shevadzutskyi began to show signs of fatigue midway through the fight, and his output dropped. This allowed Pulev to increase his attack, landing a notable heavy right hand in the eighth. Shevadzutskyi attempted to be more aggressive in the closing rounds, which pleased the fans in attendance. Both boxers finished the fight actively engaging, with the crowd responding very positively.

=== WBA (Regular) heavyweight champion ===
==== Pulev vs. Charr ====
A fight between Pulev and Charr (34–4, 20 KOs) for Charr's WBA 'regular' title was first announced in January 2024 to take place in Bulgaria on 30 March. Charr was reinstated as WBA secondary heavyweight champion in September 2023 after a long legal dispute involving the WBA veteran promoter Don King. Charr was originally stripped of the belt due to his inability to defend the title against King-promoted boxer Trevor Bryan. On 22 March, a week prior to the fight taking place, Charr reportedly injured his left arm. The card still went ahead with Shevadutskyi stepping up to replace Charr, in a losing effort to Pulev. The fight was rescheduled to take place on 7 December 2024. It was noted that Charr had been very inactive, having fought only three times since 2017 and having no fights between 2017 and 2021. On 26 November, the WBA confirmed the bout, to take place at Arena Sofia in Bulgaria. The fight aired live on DAZN. Charr saw the fight as an opportunity to regain relevance in the heavyweight division after being mostly inactive in the last ten years. He believed Pulev was mentally fragile and that he would be able to score a points win or a stoppage. Charr weighed 257 pounds, his heaviest in nearly 12 years. Pulev officially weighed in at 251.3 pounds; however, he was fully clothed. He later claimed that he was closer to 244¾ pounds.

With over 10,000 fans in attendance, Pulev defeated Charr via unanimous decision over 12 rounds to claim the WBA's secondary heavyweight title. Pulev was in control throughout the bout, landing his sharp, busy jab and keeping Charr at a distance. Charr struggled with accuracy as he came forward with his high-guard pressure. He failed to break through Pulev's timing. As the rounds went on, the damage on Charr's face became more visible. Charr out-landed Pulev (106–81) in power punches. The three judges scored the fight 117–111, 117–111, and 116–112 in Pulev's favour. According to CompuBox, Pulev laded 221 of 920 punches thrown (24%) and Charr landed 155 of his 509 thrown (30%).

==== First defence negotiations ====
The WBA mandated that Pulev conduct his first defense against mandatory challenger Michael Hunter (24–1–2, 17 KOs). As no terms were finalized, the fight proceeded to purse bids on May 27, 2025. Pulev was allocated a larger share of the 75%-25% split. Hall of Fame promoter Don King emerged victorious with a winning bid of $1.1 million. King proposed August 23 as a potential date for the fight, with Florida, Las Vegas, Ohio, and Pennsylvania considered as possible locations. In August, Riyadh Season announced that Hunter would fight Jarrell Miller on September 11, 2025, in Las Vegas. Within a day of the fight being announced, Don King filed a cease and desist order to the organisers to prevent the fighting taking place. In a statement, he said, “Hunter is under contract to Don King Productions and he’ll be fighting for a world championship.” At the same time it was revealed that Hunter released a formal legal declaration asserting his status as a free agent. Hunter alleged that DKP was in "material breach" due to a failure to respond to legal correspondence by April 27, thereby terminating any contractual obligations. On August 13, King announced Pulev vs. Hunter to take place on October 4 at Casino Miami in Florida. After an extended period of contention, Epic Sports & Entertainment announced the successful re-establishment of full control over Pulev's inaugural title defense, subsequent to the annulled purse bid that had previously been "secured" by Don King Productions. The WBA determined that Hunter was no longer in a mandatory position due to complications related to his promotion.

==== Pulev vs. Gassiev ====
On 15 October 2025, the WBA officially ordered Pulev to fight their No.1 ranked contender, 20-year old, Moses Itauma (13–0, 11 KOs), who was coming off a first-round stoppage win over former contender Dillian Whyte. Itauma previously declined an IBF eliminator bout against Frank Sánchez. The teams had until 14 November to agree terms. A day later, Pulev announced he would defend his WBA title on 12 December 2025, against Murat Gassiev (32–2, 25 KOs) at Duty Free Tennis Stadium in Dubai, part of a two-week festival. The WBA was contemplating allowing Pulev to avoid the mandatory fight with Itauma, despite ordering him to compete against him. They indicated that Pulev needed to submit a 'Special Permit Request.' They stated, “At Pulev’s request, and consistent with his Settlement Agreement with the WBA, the WBA is inclined to sanction a Pulev-Gassiev bout.” It remained uncertain whether the winner of the fight would be obligated to face Itauma immediately afterward. On 11 November, the WBA approved the fight. Pulev weighed 253.5 pounds and Gassiev came in at 230.8 pounds. Pulev lost by knockout in the sixth round. He controlled the fight in the beginning with his jab and landed punches with consistency. Gassiev was patient and more measured. By the third round, Gassiev began connecting to the body. In the fifth, Pulev came back into the fight landing power shots, pushing Gassiev against the ropes, in what was the most competitive round. In the sixth round, Gassiev landed a well-times left hook that knocked Pulev hard on his back on the canvas. Pulev attempted to get up, but the referee stopped the fight. Prior to the fight, the WBA mandated that the winner to fight Itauma, provided Itauma defeated Jermaine Franklin on 24 January 2026.

== Triller Triad Combat ==
On 27 November 2021, Pulev became Triad Combat heavyweight world champion after beating MMA fighter Frank Mir in the main event of a boxing vs. MMA event. Promoted by Triller and held at the Globe Life Field in Arlington, Texas, Pulev defeated Mir via TKO at 1 minute 59 seconds in the first round of a scheduled nine-round bout.

== Sexual harassment allegations ==
On 23 March 2019, after defeating Bogdan Dinu in Costa Mesa, Pulev forcibly kissed a female reporter Jennifer Ravalo on the lips during an interview. The California State Athletic Commission responded by suspending Pulev's licence. In response, Kubrat's younger brother, Tervel Pulev, posted a video taken hours after the incident without the knowledge of Ravalo, showing her suggestively dancing with a member of Kubrat's entourage. On 28 March 2019, Ravalo announced that she would be taking legal action against Pulev with Gloria Allred as her lawyer. On 24 July 2019, Pulev had his boxing license reinstated by the CSAC after he completed his sexual harassment prevention class, with a caveat that his license will be revoked if similar offenses were to occur.

== Personal life ==
Pulev has a younger brother, Tervel Pulev, who is also a professional boxer. Both brothers are named after Medieval Bulgarian rulers - Kubrat and Tervel. Pulev has declined lucrative financial offers to represent Germany, viewing it as a matter of principle not to change his national allegiance. In December 2020, Tervel Pulev revealed in an interview that Kubrat had recovered from COVID-19. Pulev has two children.

== Professional boxing record ==
| 36 fights | 32 wins | 4 losses |
|---|---|---|
| By knockout | 14 | 3 |
| By decision | 17 | 1 |
| By disqualification | 1 | 0 |

| No. | Result | Record | Opponent | Type | Round, time | Date | Location | Notes |
|---|---|---|---|---|---|---|---|---|
| 36 | Loss | 32–4 | Murat Gassiev | KO | 6 (12), 0:50 | 12 Dec 2025 | Duty Free Tennis Stadium, Dubai, UAE | Lost WBA (Regular) heavyweight title |
| 35 | Win | 32–3 | Mahmoud Charr | UD | 12 | 7 Dec 2024 | Sofia Hall, Sofia, Bulgaria | Won WBA (Regular) heavyweight title |
| 34 | Win | 31–3 | Ihor Shevadzutskyi | UD | 12 | 30 Mar 2024 | Arena Armeec, Sofia, Bulgaria | Won vacant WBA International heavyweight title |
| 33 | Win | 30–3 | Andrzej Wawrzyk | UD | 10 | 14 Dec 2023 | The Hangar, Costa Mesa, California, US | |
| 32 | Loss | 29–3 | Derek Chisora | SD | 12 | 9 Jul 2022 | The O2 Arena, London, England | For vacant WBA International heavyweight title |
| 31 | Win | 29–2 | Jerry Forrest | UD | 10 | 14 May 2022 | Kia Forum, Inglewood, California, US | |
| 30 | Loss | 28–2 | Anthony Joshua | KO | 9 (12), 2:58 | 12 Dec 2020 | The SSE Arena, London, England | For WBA (Super), IBF, WBO, and IBO heavyweight titles |
| 29 | Win | 28–1 | Rydell Booker | UD | 10 | 9 Nov 2019 | Chukchansi Park, Fresno, California, US | |
| 28 | Win | 27–1 | Bogdan Dinu | KO | 7 (10), 2:40 | 23 Mar 2019 | The Hangar, Costa Mesa, California, US | |
| 27 | Win | 26–1 | Hughie Fury | UD | 12 | 27 Oct 2018 | Arena Armeec, Sofia, Bulgaria | |
| 26 | Win | 25–1 | Kevin Johnson | UD | 12 | 28 Apr 2017 | Arena Armeec, Sofia, Bulgaria | Retained WBA Inter-Continental heavyweight title |
| 25 | Win | 24–1 | Samuel Peter | RTD | 3 (12), 3:00 | 3 Dec 2016 | Arena Armeec, Sofia, Bulgaria | Won vacant WBA Inter-Continental heavyweight title |
| 24 | Win | 23–1 | Derek Chisora | SD | 12 | 7 May 2016 | Barclaycard Arena, Hamburg, Germany | Won vacant European heavyweight title |
| 23 | Win | 22–1 | Maurice Harris | KO | 1 (8), 1:59 | 5 Dec 2015 | Inselparkhalle Wilhelmsburg, Hamburg, Germany | |
| 22 | Win | 21–1 | George Arias | UD | 8 | 17 Oct 2015 | Max-Schmeling-Halle, Berlin, Germany | |
| 21 | Loss | 20–1 | Wladimir Klitschko | KO | 5 (12), 2:11 | 15 Nov 2014 | O2 World, Hamburg, Germany | For IBF and The Ring heavyweight titles |
| 20 | Win | 20–0 | Ivica Perković | RTD | 3 (8), 3:00 | 5 Apr 2014 | StadtHalle, Rostock, Germany | |
| 19 | Win | 19–0 | Joey Abell | RTD | 4 (12), 3:00 | 14 Dec 2013 | Jahnsportforum, Neubrandenburg, Germany | Retained IBF International heavyweight title |
| 18 | Win | 18–0 | Tony Thompson | UD | 12 | 24 Aug 2013 | Sport Center, Schwerin, Germany | Retained IBF International heavyweight title |
| 17 | Win | 17–0 | Alexander Ustinov | KO | 11 (12), 1:28 | 29 Sep 2012 | Alsterdorfer Sporthalle, Hamburg, Germany | Retained IBF International and European heavyweight titles |
| 16 | Win | 16–0 | Alexander Dimitrenko | KO | 11 (12), 2:59 | 5 May 2012 | Messe, Erfurt, Germany | Retained IBF International heavyweight title; Won vacant European heavyweight title |
| 15 | Win | 15–0 | Michael Sprott | RTD | 9 (12), 3:00 | 14 Jan 2012 | Baden-Arena, Offenburg, Germany | Retained IBF International heavyweight title |
| 14 | Win | 14–0 | Travis Walker | UD | 12 | 22 Oct 2011 | Arena Ludwigsburg, Ludwigsburg, Germany | Won vacant IBF International heavyweight title |
| 13 | Win | 13–0 | Maksym Pediura | UD | 8 | 16 Jul 2011 | Olympia Eishalle, Munich, Germany | |
| 12 | Win | 12–0 | Derric Rossy | TKO | 5 (8), 2:15 | 7 May 2011 | Koncerthuset, Copenhagen, Denmark | |
| 11 | Win | 11–0 | Yaroslav Zavorotnyi | UD | 8 | 12 Feb 2011 | MCH Arena, Herning, Denmark | |
| 10 | Win | 10–0 | Paolo Vidoz | UD | 8 | 18 Dec 2010 | Max-Schmeling-Halle, Berlin, Germany | |
| 9 | Win | 9–0 | Dominick Guinn | UD | 8 | 30 Oct 2010 | StadtHalle, Rostock, Germany | |
| 8 | Win | 8–0 | Evgeny Orlov | DQ | 7 (8), 0:16 | 1 May 2010 | Weser-Ems-Halle, Oldenburg, Germany | Orlov disqualified for rabbit punching |
| 7 | Win | 7–0 | Danny Batchelder | TKO | 2 (8), 0:45 | 13 Mar 2010 | Max-Schmeling-Halle, Berlin, Germany | |
| 6 | Win | 6–0 | Isossa Mondo | RTD | 3 (8), 3:00 | 20 Feb 2010 | Hall omnisports "La Préalle", Liège, Belgium | |
| 5 | Win | 5–0 | Matt Skelton | KO | 4 (8), 2:14 | 30 Jan 2010 | Jahnsportforum, Neubrandenburg, Germany | |
| 4 | Win | 4–0 | Zack Page | UD | 6 | 5 Dec 2009 | Arena Ludwigsburg, Ludwigsburg, Germany | |
| 3 | Win | 3–0 | Gbenga Oloukun | UD | 6 | 7 Nov 2009 | Nuremberg Arena, Nuremberg, Germany | |
| 2 | Win | 2–0 | Serdar Uysal | TKO | 4 (4), 0:56 | 17 Oct 2009 | O2 World, Berlin, Germany | |
| 1 | Win | 1–0 | Florian Benche | TKO | 2 (4), 2:05 | 19 Sep 2009 | Jahnsportforum, Neubrandenburg, Germany | |

== Triad combat record ==
| 1 fight | 1 win | 0 losses |
|---|---|---|
| By knockout | 1 | 0 |

| No. | Result | Record | Opponent | Type | Round, time | Date | Location | Notes |
|---|---|---|---|---|---|---|---|---|
| 1 | Win | 1–0 | Frank Mir | TKO | 1 (9), 1:59 | 27 Nov 2021 | Globe Life Field, Arlington, Texas, U.S. | Won Inaugural Triad Combat World heavyweight title |

== Viewership ==
=== International ===
| Date | Fight | Network | Country | Viewers | Source |
|---|---|---|---|---|---|
| 5 May 2012 | Kubrat Pulev vs. Alexander Dimitrenko | Das Erste | Germany | 1,920,000 | |
| 29 September 2012 | Kubrat Pulev vs. Alexander Ustinov | Das Erste | Germany | 1,870,000 | |
| 24 August 2013 | Kubrat Pulev vs. Tony Thompson | Das Erste | Germany | 1,270,000 | |
| 15 November 2014 | Wladimir Klitschko vs. Kubrat Pulev | RTL Television | Germany | 9,160,000 | |
| 15 November 2014 | Wladimir Klitschko vs. Kubrat Pulev | Nova | Bulgaria | 1,800,000 | |
| 7 May 2016 | Kubrat Pulev vs. Derek Chisora | Sat.1 | Germany | 1,930,000 | |
| Total viewership | | | | 16,930,000 | |

=== Pay-per-view bouts ===
| Date | Fight | Network | Buys | Source(s) |
|---|---|---|---|---|
| 12 December 2020 | Anthony Joshua vs. Kubrat Pulev | Sky Box Office | 948,000 | |
| | Total buys | | 948,000 | |

== See also ==
- List of male boxers
- List of world heavyweight boxing champions

Sporting positions
Regional boxing titles
| Vacant Title last held by Tomasz Adamek | IBF International heavyweight champion 22 October 2011 – November 2014; Vacated | Vacant Title next held by Artur Szpilka |
| Vacant Title last held by Robert Helenius | European heavyweight champion 5 May 2012 – August 2013; Vacated | Vacant Title next held by Derek Chisora |
| Vacant Title last held by Robert Helenius | European heavyweight champion 7 May 2016 – 21 November 2016; Vacated | Vacant Title next held by Agit Kabayel |
| Vacant Title last held by Luis Ortiz | WBA Inter-Continental heavyweight champion 3 December 2016 – November 2017; Vacated | Vacant Title next held by Alexander Povetkin |
| Vacant Title last held by Justis Huni | WBA International heavyweight champion 30 March 2024 – September 2024; Vacated | Vacant Title next held by Moses Itauma |
World boxing titles
| Preceded by Mahmoud Charr | WBA heavyweight champion Regular title 7 Dec 2024 – 12 Dec 2025 | Succeeded by Murat Gassiev |
