= Didier Bence =

Canadian boxer (born 1987)

Personal information
- Born: Didier Bence; August 14, 1987 (age 39) Laval, Quebec, Canada
- Height: 6 ft 1 in (1.85 m)
- Weight: Heavyweight

Boxing career
- Stance: Orthodox

Boxing record
- Total fights: 13
- Wins: 10
- Win by KO: 3
- Losses: 3
- Draws: 0
- No contests: 0
Medal record
Representing Canada
Pan American Games
Bronze medal – third place	2007 Rio de Janeiro	Super heavyweight
Francophone Games
Silver medal – second place	2009 Beirut	Super heavyweight
Pan American Boxing Championship
Silver medal – second place	2010 Ecuador	Heavyweight

Didier Bence (born August 14, 1987) is a Canadian professional heavyweight boxer from Laval, Quebec.

He is best known for becoming a Canadian amateur boxing champion as a teenager and winning bronze at the 2007 Pan American Games, defeating two-time US champion Mike Wilson twice in the process due to controversial stoppage at the 1:03 mark of the third round.

Being the most favorable participant of Pan American Games, walked away due to severe injury in his semifinal against Colombian Oscar Rivas and lost by walkover which earned him bronze. This injury didn't stop him to pursue his dream in Commonwealth Games and turning professional in 2011.

== Amateur career ==
Bence, who was coached by Claude Bélanger, is 6 feet 1 inches tall and weighs 230 pounds, relying on extraordinary speed and power as a heavyweight. Bence started boxing at the age of 14 and won the Canadian junior championships in 2005 and 2006 and the senior title at super heavyweight in 2007 till 2010. He upset Mike Wilson on points in the PanAm qualifier (in Argentina) and faced him again in a bout at the main event in Rio de Janeiro which he won again this time by controversial stoppage at the 1:03 mark of the third round. Wilson had led by an 8–5 margin at the time of the stoppage. Due to an injury, he couldn't participate in the semifinal against Colombian Oscar Rivas and lost by walkover which earned him bronze. This injury also kept him from participating in the 2007 World Amateur Boxing Championships. In the middle of 2007 his record was 30–7.

At the end of 2007 he defended his national title in a tournament valid for 2008. At the "Copa Independencia" tournament in early 2008 he reached the final but lost to PanAm Champ Robert Alfonso. Jeux de la francophone in 2009 lost by decision in the finals claiming a silver medal.

Continental championship lost against Jorge Quiñonez in the finals against (Ecuador) 2010 taking the silver medal.

He finished the year featuring in the 2010 Commonwealth Games in New Delhi. The then 23 years old in a fiery contest, charged in the third and final round when it appeared winning the fight. Parker was down 7:5 on points when he landed a decisive right hand to Bence's head with one minute 15 seconds remaining. It knocked the Canadian down and effectively ended the fight as Joseph Parker registered the last nine points 14:7. Joseph Parker then advanced to the quarterfinals, losing to Tariq Abdul Haqq.

At the second Olympic qualifier he lost 3:4 to Michael Hunter jr. and didn't make it to Beijing. End of his amateur career his record was 46–13.

== Professional ==
He turned pro in 2011 and beat American amateur stars Joey Dawejko and Jonte Willis and KOd undefeated countryman Eric Barrak (7–0) but was KOd by unknown Eric Martel Bahoeli (9–3) in 2013 and outpointed by Sylvera Louis (5–3) in 2014. It is believed that his failure to advance in his professional career was due to a misfortune, losing his boxing coach Claude Bélanger in 2012.

=== Professional record ===
10 Wins (3 knockouts, 7 decisions), 3 Loss, 0 Draw
Res.	Record	Opponent	Type	Rd., Time	Date	Location	Notes
Loss	10-3	(United States) Avery Gibson	UD	8	2016-05-27	(Canada) Parc de l'Exposition, Trois-Rivières, Quebec	
Loss	10-2	(Canada) Sylvera Louis	MD	8	2014-10-25	(Canada) The Mattamy Events Center, Toronto, Ontario	Lost vacant Canada Cruiserweight title.
Win	10-1	(Canada) Rob Nichols	UD	6	2014-08-30	(Canada) Hotel Mortagne, Boucherville, Quebec	
Loss	9-1	(Canada) Eric Martel Bahoeli	TKO	2 (8)	2013-11-30	(Canada) Colisée Pepsi, Québec City, Quebec	
Win	9-0	(Canada) Eric Barrak	KO	5 (8)	2013-06-08	(Canada) Bell Centre, Montreal, Quebec	
Win	8-0	(United States) Jonte Willis	UD	8	2013-03-22	(Canada) Bell Centre, Montreal, Quebec	
Win	7-0	(United States) Joey Dawejko	UD	6	2013-02-08	(Canada) Bell Centre, Montreal, Quebec	
Win	6-0	(United States) Harold Sconiers	UD	6	2012-10-12	(Canada) Bell Centre, Montreal, Quebec	
Win	5-0	(Canada) Stephane Tessier	UD	6	2012-06-08	(Canada) Bell Centre, Montreal, Quebec	
Win	4-0	(Canada) Sandy Pembroke	UD	4	2011-12-10	(Canada) Bell Centre, Montreal, Quebec	
Win	3-0	(Latvia) Pavels Dolgovs	UD	4	2011-10-20	(Canada) Bell Centre, Montreal, Quebec	
Win	2-0	(Canada) Dwayne Storey	TKO	2 (4)	2011-05-21	(Canada) Bell Centre, Montreal, Quebec	
Win	1-0	(United States) Leonard Collier	TKO	1 (4)	2011-04-08	(Canada) Bell Centre, Montreal, Quebec	Bence's pro debut.
