= Boxing at the 2008 Summer Olympics – Super heavyweight =

Boxing competitions

The super heavyweight class in the boxing at the 2008 Summer Olympics competition is the heaviest class. Super heavyweights were limited to those boxers weighing over 91 kilograms (200.6 pounds).

Like all Olympic boxing events, the competition was a straight single-elimination tournament. Both semifinal losers were awarded bronze medals, so no boxers competed again after their first loss. Bouts consisted of four rounds of two minutes each, with one-minute breaks between rounds. Punches scored only if the white area on the front of the glove made full contact with the front of the head or torso of the opponent. Five judges scored each bout; three of the judges had to signal a scoring punch within one second for the punch to score. The winner of the bout was the boxer who scored the most valid punches by the end of the bout.

16 boxers qualified for this category after the 2007 World Amateur Boxing Championships and 9 Continental Qualification Tournaments.

== Medalists ==
Gold	Roberto Cammarelle; Italy
Silver	Zhang Zhilei; China
Bronze	David Price; Great Britain
Bronze	Vyacheslav Glazkov; Ukraine

== Draw ==
All times are China Standard Time (UTC+8)

Round of 16; Wednesday, 13 August 2008; 20:45-22:45
Vyacheslav Glazkov (UKR)	5
Robert Alfonso (CUB)	3
Newfel Ouatah (ALG)	7
José Payares (VEN)	5
Mohamed Amanissi (MAR)	0
Zhang Zhilei (CHN)	15
Daniel Beahan (AUS)
Ruslan Myrsatayev (KAZ)	RSC
Roberto Cammarelle (ITA)	13
Marko Tomasović (CRO)	1
Kubrat Pulev (BUL)	5
Óscar Rivas (COL)	11
Islam Timurziev (RUS)
David Price (GBR)	RSC
Onorede Ohwarieme (NGR)	1
Jaroslavas Jakšto (LTU)	11

Quarterfinals; Monday, 18 August 2008; 21:00-22:00
Vyacheslav Glazkov (UKR)	10
Newfel Ouatah (ALG)	4
Zhang Zhilei (CHN)	12
Ruslan Myrsatayev (KAZ)	2
Roberto Cammarelle (ITA)	9
Óscar Rivas (COL)	5
David Price (GBR)	RSC
Jaroslavas Jakšto (LTU)

Semifinals; Friday, 22 August 2008; 21:30-22:00
Vyacheslav Glazkov (UKR)	WO
Zhang Zhilei (CHN)
Roberto Cammarelle (ITA)	RSC
David Price (GBR)

Final; Sunday, 24 August 2008; 16:30-16:50
Zhang Zhilei (CHN)
Roberto Cammarelle (ITA)	RSC

== See also ==
- 2009 World Amateur Boxing Championships – Super heavyweight
