= Óscar Rivas =

Colombian boxer (born 1987)

Oscar Rivas
Personal information
- Nickname: Kaboom
- Nationality: Colombian; Canadian
- Born: Óscar Andres Rivas Torres; 6 June 1987 (age 39) Buenaventura, Colombia
- Height: 6 ft 0 1/2 in (1.84 m)
- Weight: Bridgerweight; Heavyweight

Boxing career
- Reach: 76 1/2 in (194 cm)
- Stance: Orthodox

Boxing record
- Total fights: 29
- Wins: 28
- Win by KO: 19
- Losses: 1
Medal record
Representing Colombia
Men's amateur Boxing
Pan American Games
Silver medal – second place	2007 Rio de Janeiro	Super Heavyweight

Óscar Andres Rivas Torres (born 6 June 1987) is a Colombian professional boxer. He held the WBC bridgerweight title from 2021 to 2023. He also challenged for the vacant WBC interim heavyweight title in 2019, and previously held the IBF International, WBC-NABF and WBO-NABO heavyweight titles. As an amateur, he won a silver medal at the 2007 Pan American Games.

== Amateur career ==
In Cartagena at the 2006 Caribbean Games, the 212 lbs Rivas lost in the first round to Cuban Olympic Bronze medalist Michel López Núñez 4:6.

On 4 February 2007 at a PanAm qualifier Rivas scored his first big win by beating two-time American champ Mike Wilson 24:19 but lost to Cuban Robert Alfonso 12:21. In the Pan-American main event in Rio he beat Gerardo Bisbal 22:8, Didier Bence by walkover (injured) and reached the final but lost to Alfonso once again, this time 4:8.

In Chicago, at the 2007 AIBA World Boxing Championships he stopped Dominican Lequan Carlisle but lost to eventual silver medalist Vyacheslav Glazkov 7:23.

At the first Olympic qualifier in March 2008, he lost to American Michael Hunter Jr.; however, in April 2008 he qualified for the 2008 Olympics through the second American qualifier with a 16:4 over Mexican Andy Ruiz Jr. and a 6:5 victory over Brazilian Gleison Abreu.

At the Olympics he upset European champion Kubrat Pulev of Bulgaria 11:5, but lost to Italian world champion and eventual Olympic champion Roberto Cammarelle 5:9.

== Professional career ==
=== Heavyweight ===
==== Early career ====
Rivas turned pro in 2009 for Yvon Michel in Canada. After compiling a perfect record of 20–0, he captured the vacant NABF heavyweight title in his 21st fight after beating former world title challenger Carl Davis Drumond by first-round knockout on 28 September 2017, with the stoppage coming just 68 seconds into the fight.

==== Rivas vs. Jennings ====
After four more consecutive wins, Rivas defeated former WBA interim heavyweight champion Bryant Jennings via twelfth-round technical knockout in his 26th fight on 18 January 2019 to win the IBF International and WBO-NABO heavyweight titles. Jennings was a highly ranked heavyweight at the time, ranked at #2 by the WBO, #7 by the WBA, #8 by the IBF and #14 by the WBC.

==== Rivas vs. Whyte ====
With an undefeated record of 26–0, Rivas challenged Dillian Whyte for the vacant WBC interim heavyweight title. Whyte was ranked #1 by the WBC and #3 by the WBA and WBO at heavyweight. Rivas knocked Whyte down in the ninth round with a right uppercut, but he ultimately lost the fight by unanimous decision with scores of 116–112, 115–111, 115–111.

=== Bridgerweight ===
==== Cancelled Jennings rematch ====
Rivas was scheduled to meet Bryant Jennings on 18 June 2021 in Canada in a rematch of their 2019 fight for the inaugural WBC bridgerweight title, but the fight was postponed and ultimately cancelled.

==== Rivas vs. Louis ====
On 16 March 2021, Rivas fought Sylvera Louis. Rivas won the fight within three rounds via TKO.

==== Rivas vs. Rozicki ====
On 22 October 2021, Rivas outpointed undefeated Ryan Rozicki to a unanimous decision with scores of 116–111 and 115–112 twice to become the inaugural WBC bridgerweight champion.

== Personal life ==
Rivas was born in Buenaventura, Colombia, and resides in Montreal, Quebec.

== Professional boxing record ==
29 fights	28 wins	1 loss
By knockout	19	0
By decision	9	1

No.	Result	Record	Opponent	Type	Round, time	Date	Location	Notes
29	Win	28–1	Ryan Rozicki	UD	12	22 Oct 2021	Olympia Theatre, Montreal, Canada	Won inaugural WBC bridgerweight title
28	Win	27–1	Sylvera Louis	RTD	3 (8), 3:00	16 Mar 2021	Hotel Plaza Quebec, Quebec, Canada	
27	Loss	26–1	Dillian Whyte	UD	12	20 Jul 2019	The O2 Arena, London, England	For vacant WBC interim heavyweight title
26	Win	26–0	Bryant Jennings	TKO	12 (12), 0:54	18 Jan 2019	Turning Stone Resort Casino, Verona, New York, US	Retained NABF heavyweight title; Won IBF International and WBO-NABO heavyweight titles
25	Win	25–0	Fábio Maldonado	UD	10	1 Dec 2018	Videotron Centre, Quebec City, Quebec, Canada	Retained NABF heavyweight title
24	Win	24–0	Herve Hubeaux	UD	10	19 May 2018	Air Canada Centre, Toronto, Ontario, Canada	Retained NABF heavyweight title
23	Win	23–0	Sergio Ramirez	RTD	2 (8), 3:00	19 Apr 2018	Montreal Casino, Montreal, Quebec, Canada	
22	Win	22–0	Gabriel Enguema	PTS	10	14 Dec 2017	Palais des sports Marcel-Cerdan, Paris, France	
21	Win	21–0	Carl Davis Drumond	KO	1 (10), 1:08	28 Sep 2017	Montreal Casino, Montreal, Quebec, Canada	Won vacant NABF heavyweight title
20	Win	20–0	Jeremiah Karpency	TKO	3 (10), 1:49	29 Jul 2016	Videotron Centre, Quebec City, Quebec, Canada	
19	Win	19–0	Jeremy Bates	KO	1 (8), 1:47	4 Jun 2016	Bell Centre, Montreal, Quebec, Canada	
18	Win	18–0	Joey Abell	KO	2 (10), 0:46	28 Nov 2015	Videotron Centre, Quebec City, Quebec, Canada	
17	Win	17–0	Jason Pettaway	KO	1 (8), 2:25	26 Jun 2015	Little Creek Casino Resort, Shelton, Washington, US	
16	Win	16–0	Ozcan Cetinkaya	TKO	1 (8), 1:39	4 Apr 2015	Colisée Pepsi, Quebec City, Quebec, Canada	
15	Win	15–0	Eric Barrak	TKO	2 (8), 3:00	23 Sep 2014	Montreal Casino, Montreal, Quebec, Canada	
14	Win	14–0	Daniel Cota	TKO	5 (6), 2:05	22 Aug 2014	Complexe Sportif Sportscene, Mont Saint-Hilaire, Quebec, Canada	
13	Win	13–0	Shawn Cox	TKO	3 (8), 2:53	18 Jan 2014	Bell Centre, Montreal, Quebec, Canada	
12	Win	12–0	Laszlo Peczeli	KO	1 (8), 0:23	14 Dec 2012	Bell Centre, Montreal, Quebec, Canada	
11	Win	11–0	Sylvera Louis	SD	8	8 Jun 2012	Bell Centre, Montreal, Quebec, Canada	
10	Win	10–0	Stephane Tessier	UD	6	20 Apr 2012	Bell Centre, Montreal, Quebec, Canada	
9	Win	9–0	Ivica Perkovic	TKO	3 (8), 0:51	18 Feb 2012	Bell Centre, Montreal, Quebec, Canada	
8	Win	8–0	Matthew Greer	TKO	3 (8), 2:59	10 Dec 2011	Bell Centre, Montreal, Quebec, Canada	
7	Win	7–0	Edgars Kalnars	KO	1 (6), 1:25	20 Oct 2011	Bell Centre, Montreal, Quebec, Canada	
6	Win	6–0	Zsolt Zathureczky	TKO	1 (6), 2:05	21 May 2011	Bell Centre, Montreal, Quebec, Canada	
5	Win	5–0	Wilfrido Leal	KO	6 (6), 1:13	8 Apr 2011	Bell Centre, Montreal, Quebec, Canada	
4	Win	4–0	David Whittom	MD	4	11 Feb 2011	Bell Centre, Montreal, Quebec, Canada	
3	Win	3–0	Ramon Hayes	UD	4	7 Nov 2009	Montreal Casino, Montreal, Quebec, Canada	
2	Win	2–0	Stephane Tessier	UD	4	3 Oct 2009	Montreal Casino, Montreal, Quebec, Canada	
1	Win	1–0	Joe Stofle	TKO	3 (4), 1:33	28 Aug 2009	Montreal Casino, Montreal, Quebec, Canada	

Sporting positions
Regional boxing titles
Vacant Title last held by Andy Ruiz	WBC-NABF heavyweight champion 28 September 2017 – September 2019; Vacated	Vacant Title next held by Arslanbek Makhmudov
Preceded by Bryant Jennings	IBF International heavyweight champion 18 January 2019 – July 2019; Vacated	Vacant Title next held by Tom Schwarz
Preceded by Bryant Jennings	WBO–NABO heavyweight champion 18 January 2019 – July 2019; Vacated	Vacant Title next held by Frank Sánchez
World boxing titles
Inaugural champion	WBC bridgerweight champion October 22, 2021 – January 5, 2023; Status changed:champ in recess	Vacant Title next held by Łukasz Różański
