= Bogdan Dinu =

Romanian boxer

Personal information
- Born: 15 August 1986 (age 40) Buzău, Romania
- Height: 6 ft 5 in (1.96 m)
- Weight: Heavyweight

Boxing career
- Stance: Orthodox

Boxing record
- Total fights: 25
- Wins: 20
- Win by KO: 16
- Losses: 5

Bogdan Dinu (born 15 August 1986) is a Romanian former professional boxer who competed from 2008 to 2023.

== Biography ==
Dinu was born on 15 August 1986 in Buzău, Romania. He is also an Independent Special Actions and Intervention Service (SIIAS) agent.

== Professional career ==
Dinu turned pro in 2008.

On 13 December 2013, Dinu won the third season edition of Bigger's Better, a boxing tournament under a familiar format of the popular UK Prizefighter series, with all the fights scheduled for three-minute rounds. He rocked through his first tournament in Greece, until to repeat the trick later in the same year in the super final from Portugal.

On 17 November 2018, Dinu faced title contender Jarrell Miller, who was ranked #2 by the WBA and #4 by the WBO. Dinu started the fight well, boxing behind his jab. His start was overshadowed by the powerful Miller, who started to apply more pressure in the fourth round, and dropped Dinu twice, who couldn't beat the count the second time. Eventually, Miller tested positive for GW501516 prior his next fight against Anthony Joshua, causing the New York State Athletic Commission (NYSAC) to deny him a license to box. Further tests proved positive for EPO and HGH.

In his following fight, Dinu faced another title contender in Kubrat Pulev. Pulev was ranked #1 by the IBF and #9 by the WBC. The fight started off slow, as Pulev picked up the pace in round two. In the fourth round, Dinu connected on a couple of overhand rights, which caused a severe cut over Pulev's left eye. Pulev was cleared to continue the fight. By round seven, Pulev had regained his confidence, and managed to drop Dinu three times in the round. Dinu managed to get up from the first two, but after the third knockdown in a row, the referee decided to stop the fight.

On 14 December 2019, Dinu bounced back with a fourth round TKO win against Osborn Machimana.

On 3 October 2020, Dinu beat Frank Bluemle via second round TKO.

On 5 June 2021, Dinu challenged for the vacant WBA interim heavyweight title, but was unsuccessful, losing to Daniel Dubois by second-round knockout in Telford, England. He ended his career in 2026.

== Professional boxing record ==
25 fights	20 wins	5 losses
By knockout	16	5
By decision	4	0

No.	Result	Record	Opponent	Type	Round, time	Date	Location	Notes
25	Loss	20–5	Frazer Clarke	RTD	2 (8)	25 Mar 2023	AO Arena, Manchester, England	
24	Loss	20–4	Kevin Lerena	KO	4 (10), 2:59	26 Mar 2022	Emperors Palace, Kempton Park, South Africa	For vacant WBA Inter-Continental heavyweight title
23	Loss	20–3	Daniel Dubois	KO	2 (12), 0:31	5 Jun 2021	Telford International Centre, Telford, England	For vacant WBA interim heavyweight title
22	Win	20–2	Frank Bluemle	TKO	2 (10), 2:36	3 Oct 2020	Roman Amphitheatre, Plovdiv, Bulgaria	
21	Win	19–2	Osborn Machimana	TKO	4 (10), 1:10	14 Dec 2019	Kolodruma, Plovdiv, Bulgaria	
20	Loss	18–2	Kubrat Pulev	KO	7 (10), 2:40	23 Mar 2019	The Hangar, Costa Mesa, California, US	
19	Loss	18–1	Jarrell Miller	KO	4 (12), 2:45	17 Nov 2018	Kansas Star Arena, Mulvane, Kansas, US	For vacant WBA-NABA interim heavyweight title
18	Win	18–0	Marcelo Nascimento	KO	3 (8), 2:50	8 Dec 2017	Sports Hall, Buzau, Romania	
17	Win	17–0	Irakli Gvenetadze	KO	4 (10)	6 May 2017	Olimpia Hall, Timișoara, Romania	
16	Win	16–0	Davit Gorgiladze	TKO	4 (10), 1:31	14 Oct 2016	Circus Globus, Bucharest, Romania	
15	Win	15–0	Marino Goles	KO	1 (10), 1:37	18 Mar 2016	Circus, Bucharest, Romania	
14	Win	14–0	Manuel Alberto Pucheta	RTD	6 (8), 3:00	28 Nov 2015	Videotron Centre, Quebec City, Quebec, Canada	
13	Win	13–0	Ed Perry	KO	2 (8), 1:18	15 Aug 2015	Bell Centre, Montreal, Quebec, Canada	
12	Win	12–0	Mickael Vieira	KO	1 (8), 2:49	6 Dec 2014	Bell Centre, Montreal, Quebec, Canada	
11	Win	11–0	Kertson Manswell	TKO	2 (8), 2:04	23 Sep 2014	Montreal Casino, Montreal, Quebec, Canada	
10	Win	10–0	Avery Gibson	UD	6	31 May 2014	Vaudreuil-Dorion, Quebec City, Quebec, Canada	
9	Win	9–0	Ben Nsafoah	TKO	5 (6), 1:08	29 Nov 2012	Polyvalent Hall, Craiova, Romania	
8	Win	8–0	Éric Martel-Bahoéli	TKO	4 (6), 2:52	3 Nov 2012	Bell Centre, Montreal, Quebec, Canada	
7	Win	7–0	Muhammed Ali Durmaz	KO	1 (6)	9 Feb 2012	Rapid Hall, Bucharest, Romania	
6	Win	6–0	Awadh Tamim	KO	1 (4), 2:27	9 Jul 2011	Romexpo Dome, Bucharest, Romania	
5	Win	5–0	Remigijus Ziausys	UD	6	10 Apr 2010	Rapid Hall, Bucharest, Romania	
4	Win	4–0	Nikolay Marinov	KO	1 (4)	5 Jun 2009	Rapid Hall, Bucharest, Romania	
3	Win	3–0	James Pratt	KO	1 (4), 0:32	19 Dec 2008	Olimpia Sports Hall, Ploiești, Romania	
2	Win	2–0	Shawn McLean	UD	4	1 Aug 2008	Polyvalent Hall, Piatra Neamţ, Romania	
1	Win	1–0	Stéphane Tessier	UD	4	19 Apr 2008	Polyvalent Hall, Bucharest, Romania	

== Bigger's Better record ==
6 Wins (3 knockouts, 3 decisions), 0 Losses, 0 Draws
Res.	Record	Opponent	Type	Rd., Time	Date	Location	Notes
Win	6-0	(Romania) Lucian Bot	UD	3 (3)	2013-12-13	Estádio da Luz, Lisbon, Portugal	Won the 2013 Bigger's Better edition.
Win	5-0	(France) Fabrice Aurieng	UD	3 (3)	2013-12-13	Estádio da Luz, Lisbon, Portugal	Bigger's Better King: semifinal.
Win	4-0	(Lithuania) Sergej Maslobojev	TKO	3 (3)	2013-12-13	Estádio da Luz, Lisbon, Portugal	Bigger's Better King: quarterfinal.
Win	3-0	(Greece) Edmond Baltatzis	KO	1 (3)	2013-07-05	Sithonia, Greece	Won Bigger's Better 23 and qualified for the final tournament.
Win	2-0	(Russia) Vladimir Toktasynov	TKO	1 (3)	2013-07-05	Sithonia, Greece	Bigger's Better 23: semifinal.
Win	1-0	(Ukraine) Dmitri Bezus	UD	3 (3)	2013-07-05	Sithonia, Greece	Bigger's Better 23: quarterfinal.

== Titles ==
- 2013 Bigger's Better champion.
