= Derric Rossy =

American boxer (born 1980)

Personal information
- Nickname: The Shaolin Fist / El Leon
- Nationality: American
- Born: July 2, 1980 (age 46)
- Height: 6 ft 3 in (191 cm)
- Weight: Heavyweight

Boxing career
- Stance: Orthodox

Boxing record
- Total fights: 44
- Wins: 31
- Win by KO: 14
- Losses: 13

Derric Rossy (born July 2, 1980) is an American former professional boxer and a former defensive end at Boston College. He enrolled in the Lynch School of Education with a major in human development.

Rossy knocked out Gary Bell in the second round to win the vacant New York State heavyweight title. He has also sparred with Tomasz Adamek.

== Early life ==
Rossy played football at Patchogue-Medford High School in Medford, New York. As a senior, he won All-American honors from SuperPrep magazine, received an All-America honorable mention from USA Today, was an all-state and all-Long Island selection, and received the Hansen Award as the Suffolk County Most Valuable Player. He was also a member of his school's basketball and baseball teams.

== Amateur career ==
Rossy fought only 10 amateur bouts and won the 2004 New York City Golden Gloves.

== Professional career ==
Rossy turned pro in 2004. He cruised through his first 15 bouts before suffering his first loss in a bout for the USBA heavyweight title to Eddie Chambers in 2007. In this bout Rossy suffered a broken ear drum and other injuries which short circuited his try for the title. After the Chambers loss, Rossy rebounded against journeyman veteran Zack Page winning a unanimous decision. On January 26, 2008 Derric and his promoter Sal Musumeci’s Final Forum Boxing made boxing history by promoting a heavyweight title fight for the first time in China. The event took place in the Venetian Arena, and was broadcast live before one-hundred and fifty-million viewers in China. The fight featured former world heavyweight Champion, Ray Mercer taking on Derric Rossy for the WBO/NABO Heavyweight Title, the WBC Asian Boxing Council Heavyweight Title, and the WBF Intercontinental Heavyweight Title. Looking impressive and winning by a unanimous decision. On May 3, 2008, Rossy received his second loss by German based heavyweight Alexander Dimitrenko. The fight was stopped in the fifth round, giving Dimitrenko his fourth consecutive victory by TKO and the fight was for Dimitrenko's WBO Inter-Continental heavyweight belt.

Rossy has never managed get past journeyman status, but has faced several notable opponents, including Kubrat Pulev, Audley Harrison, Fres Oquendo, and Joe Hanks. In his most recent fight, he lost a controversial decision to the unbeaten contender Vyacheslav Glazkov.

== Professional boxing record ==
30 Wins (14 knockouts), 11 Losses, 0 Draws
Result	Record	Opponent	Type	Round	Date	Location	Notes
Loss	31-13	(Puerto Rico) Carlos Negron	TKO	4 (10)	24/06/2017	(United States) Freedom Hall, Louisville, Kentucky, U.S.	For vacant WBC Continental Americas Heavyweight Title
Win	31-12	(United States) Richard Carmack	TKO	2 (6)	10/12/2016	(United States) Sands Bethlehem Event Center, Bethlehem, Pennsylvania	
Loss	30-12	(Germany) Erkan Teper	UD	10	03/07/2016	Gellersenhalle Reppenstedt, Lüneburg, Germany	
Loss	30-11	(Canada) Bermane Stiverne	UD	10	14/11/2015	(United States) Hard Rock Hotel and Casino, Paradise, Nevada, U.S.	Stiverne down in round 1.
Loss	30-10	(United States) Trevor Bryan	UD	10	28/08/2015	(United States) The D Hotel & Casino, Las Vegas, Nevada, U.S.	For vacant NABF heavyweight title. Rossy down in round 1.
Win	30–9	(Uzbekistan) Akhror Muralimov	UD	10	14/02/2015	(United States) Resorts World Casino, New York City, New York, U.S.	
Loss	29–9	(Ukraine) Vyacheslav Glazkov	MD	10	09/08/2014	(United States) Sands Casino Resort Bethlehem, Bethlehem, Pennsylvania, U.S.	Scorecards 94-96, 92-98 and 95-95
Win	29–8	(United States) Joe Hanks	MD	10	16/05/2014	Olympic Stadium, Montreal, Quebec, Canada	
Loss	28–8	(United States) Joey Dawejko	SD	8	25/01/2014	(United States) Golden Nugget Casino, Atlantic City, New Jersey, U.S.	
Loss	28–7	(United States) Fres Oquendo	UD	10	08/06/2013	(United States) Horseshoe Casino, Hammond, Indiana, U.S.	For WBA Fedelatin and vacant NABA heavyweight titles.
Loss	28–6	(United Kingdom) Audley Harrison	TKO	2 (3)	23/03/2013	(United Kingdom) York Hall, London, England	Prizefighter Tournament, heavyweight final.
Win	28–5	(United Kingdom) Ian Lewison	SD	3	23/03/2013	(United Kingdom) York Hall, London, England	Prizefighter Tournament, heavyweight semi-final.
Win	27–5	(United States) Travis Walker	SD	3	23/03/2013	(United Kingdom) York Hall, London, England	Prizefighter Tournament, heavyweight quarter-final.
Win	26–5	(Ecuador) Livin Castillo	UD	8	28/01/2012	(United States) Resorts Hotel & Casino, Atlantic City, New Jersey, U.S.	
Loss	25–5	(United States) Maurice Harris	TKO	12 (12)	16/07/2011	(United States) Resorts Hotel & Casino, Atlantic City, New Jersey, U.S.	For USBA heavyweight title.
Loss	25–4	(Bulgaria) Kubrat Pulev	TKO	5 (8)	07/05/2011	Koncerthuset, Copenhagen, Denmark	
Loss	25–3	(United States) Eddie Chambers	UD	12	11/02/2011	(United States) Bally's Atlantic City, Atlantic City, New Jersey, U.S.	
Win	25–2	(United States) Zack Page	UD	12	06/03/2010	(United States) Mohegan Sun Casino, Uncasville, Connecticut, U.S.	Retained WBC United States (USNBC) heavyweight title.
Win	24–2	(United States) Joseph Harris	TKO	2 (12)	20/02/2010	Poliforum Zamna, Mérida, Mexico	Retained WBC FECARBOX heavyweight title.
Win	23–2	(Puerto Rico) Alexis Mejias	TKO	1 (8)	27/01/2010	(United States) M2 Ultra Lounge, New York City, New York, U.S.	
Win	22–2	(Costa Rica) Carl Davis Drumond	UD	10	31/07/2009	(United States) Seminole Hard Rock Hotel and Casino, Hollywood, Florida, U.S.	Won vacant WBC United States (USNBC) heavyweight title.
Win	21–2	(United States) Moises Droz	TKO	3 (12)	03/07/2009	(United States) Club Destiny, Orlando, Florida, U.S.	Won vacant WBC FECARBOX heavyweight title.
Win	20–2	(United States) William Shahan	TKO	2 (8)	25/11/2008	(United States) Huntington Hilton Hotel, Melville, New York, U.S.	
Win	19–2	(United States) Jermell Barnes	UD	8	06/08/2008	(United States) Aviator Sports Complex, New York City, New York, U.S.	
Loss	18–2	(Ukraine) Alexander Dimitrenko	TKO	5 (12)	03/05/2008	Hanns-Martin-Schleyer-Halle, Stuttgart, Germany	For WBO Inter-Continental heavyweight title.
Win	18–1	(United States) Ray Mercer	UD	12	26/01/2008	Venetian Casino & Resort, Macau, China	Retained WBF International heavyweight title. Won interim WBO NABO heavyweight title & vacant WBC Asian Boxing Council heavyweight title.
Win	17–1	(United States) Zack Page	UD	8	03/08/2007	(United States) Monticello Raceway, Monticello, New York, U.S.	
Win	16–1	(United States) Ronald Bellamy	TKO	6 (12)	08/06/2007	(United States) Morocco Temple, Jacksonville, Florida, U.S.	Won vacant WBF International heavyweight title.
Loss	15–1	(United States) Eddie Chambers	TKO	7 (12)	09/02/2007	(United States) Suffolk Community College, Selden, New York, U.S.	For vacant USBA heavyweight title.
Win	15–0	(United States) Edward Gutierrez	TKO	4 (8)	15/12/2006	(United States) Merchant Marine Academy, Kings Point, New York, U.S.	
Win	14–0	(United States) Shannon Miller	UD	10	Nov 11, 2006	(United States) Madison Square Garden, New York City, New York, U.S.	Retained USA New York State heavyweight title.
Win	13–0	(United States) Joe Stofle	TKO	3 (8)	15/09/2006	(United States) Huntington Hilton Hotel, Melville, New York, U.S.	
Win	12–0	(United States) Demetrice King	UD	6	20/07/2006	(United States) Grand Ballroom, New York City, New York, U.S.	
Win	11–0	(United States) Corey Gregory	TKO	2 (6)	02/03/2006	(United States) Hammerstein Ballroom, New York City, New York, U.S.	
Win	10–0	(United States) Gary Bell	TKO	2 (10)	10/02/2006	(United States) Huntington Hilton Hotel, Melville, New York, U.S.	Won vacant USA New York State heavyweight title.
Win	9–0	(United States) David Polk	UD	8	21/10/2005	(United States) Mohegan Sun Casino, Uncasville, Connecticut, U.S.	
Win	8–0	(United States) Anthony Ottah	UD	6	05/08/2005	(United States) Murray Skating Center, Yonkers, New York, U.S.	
Win	7–0	(United States) David Chappell	UD	6	24/06/2005	(United States) Nikki Beach Concert Arena, Atlantic City, New Jersey, U.S.	
Win	6–0	(United States) Rodney Ray	KO	4 (4)	17/05/2005	(United States) Blue Horizon, Philadelphia, Pennsylvania, U.S.	
Win	5–0	(United States) Rubin Bracero	KO	5 (6)	22/04/2005	(United States) Tropicana Hotel & Casino, Atlantic City, New Jersey, U.S.	
Win	4–0	(United States) Edgar Myers	TKO	2 (4)	03/03/2005	(United States) Madison Square Garden Theater, New York City, New York, U.S.	
Win	3–0	(United States) Mark Miller	TKO	4 (4)	11/02/2005	(United States) Mohegan Sun Casino, Uncasville, Connecticut, U.S.	
Win	2–0	(United States) Rubin Bracero	UD	4	11/12/2004	(United States) Atlantic Oceana, Brighton Beach, New York, U.S.	
Win	1–0	(United States) Jose Luis Gomez	KO	1 (4)	30/10/2004	(United States) Orange County Fair, Middletown, New York, U.S.	
