= Mike Wilson (boxer) =

American boxer (born 1983)

Mike Wilson (born February 7, 1983) is an American professional boxer who has held the WBA-NABA cruiserweight title since 2018. As an amateur, he was a two-time U.S. National champion at super heavyweight.

== Amateur ==
He started to box in 1997 and participated in the World Junior Championships 2000 where he lost in the first round to Caba Kurtusz.

He upset George Garcia (the American participant at the world championships 2003) twice and Travis Kauffman several times which convinced Garcia and Kaufman to turn pro. He also has a DQ win over Mike Marrone but lost to him at the PAL championship 2003.

In 2004, he lost to Jason Estrada in the Olympic qualification who had beaten him before and was only Olympic alternate, but after Estrada turned pro Wilson dominated the domestic scene.

He became US champion in 2004 and 2005.

Internationally his success has been mixed. At the World Championships 2005 in Mianyang, China´he dec. Amanissi Mohamed, MAR, 27-20, in first round; dec. Rustam Rygebaev, KAZ, 26-18, in second round; but was defeated by world class southpaw (and 2007 world champion) Roberto Cammarelle, ITA, RSCO-2.

In 2007, he had a 10:13 loss to Didier Bence of Canada and Oscar Rivas of Colombia but qualified for the PanAm Games where he was controversially stopped by Bence after leading on points.

In the finals of the US championships 2007 he suffered from a tough draw, he beat Golden Gloves winners Felix Stewart and Nathaniel James but lost 24:25 to Michael Hunter jr.

At the Olympic Trials he surprisingly lost to Kimdo Bethel, but beat N.James again to get a rematch with Bethel. After Bethel beat him for the second time he was unable to qualify for the 2008 Olympics.

== Pro ==
He turned pro in September 2009 at Cruiserweight and as of August 2021 had a record of 21–2–0.

== Professional boxing record ==
23 fights	21 wins	2 losses
By knockout	10	1
By decision	11	1

No.	Result	Record	Opponent	Type	Round, time	Date	Location	Notes
23	Loss	21–2	Michael Hunter	TKO	4 (10), 2:49	Aug 3, 2021	Hulu Theater, New York City, New York, U.S.	For vacant WBA Continental Americas heavyweight title
22	Win	21–1	Gary Kopas	TKO	4 (10), 3:00	Sep 7, 2019	Jackson County, Central Point, Oregon, U.S.	Retained WBA-NABA cruiserweight title
21	Win	20–1	Germán Pérez	RTD	6 (10), 3:00	Mar 2, 2019	Jackson County Expo, Central Point, Oregon, U.S.	
20	Loss	19–1	Denis Lebedev	UD	12	Nov 24, 2018	Casino de Monte Carlo Salle Médecin, Monte Carlo, Monaco	
19	Win	19–0	Mario Aguilar	UD	10	Mar 3, 2018	Jackson County Expo, Central Point, Oregon, U.S.	Won vacant WBA-NABA cruiserweight title
18	Win	18–0	Melvin Russell	UD	10	Sep 23, 2017	Jackson County Expo, Central Point, Oregon, U.S.	
17	Win	17–0	Ernest Reyna	TKO	1 (10), 2:27	May 20, 2017	Jackson County Expo, Central Point, Oregon, U.S.	
16	Win	16–0	Aaron Chavers	UD	8	Jan 13, 2017	Jackson County Expo, Central Point, Oregon, U.S.	
15	Win	15–0	Armando Ancona	UD	8	Sep 24, 2016	Jackson County Expo, Central Point, Oregon, U.S.	
14	Win	14–0	Mike Bissett	UD	6	May 21, 2016	Jackson County Expo, Central Point, Oregon, U.S.	
13	Win	13–0	Adam Collins	TKO	2 (6), 2:34	Jan 30, 2016	Jackson County Expo, Central Point, Oregon, U.S.	
12	Win	12–0	Juan Reyna	KO	2 (6), 1:10	Jul 11, 2015	Fairgrounds, Medford, Oregon, U.S.	
11	Win	11–0	Derek Williams	KO	2 (6), 1:13	Apr 11, 2015	Compton Arena, Medford, Oregon, U.S.	
10	Win	10–0	Mike Alderete	UD	6	Aug 3, 2013	Seven Feathers Hotel & Casino, Canyonville, Oregon, U.S.	
9	Win	9–0	Rayford Johnson	UD	6	Mar 16, 2013	Seven Feathers Hotel & Casino, Canyonville, Oregon, U.S.	
8	Win	8–0	Khuzaymah Al Nubu	TKO	1 (4), 1:14	Dec 7, 2012	Shrine Auditorium, Billings, Montana, U.S.	
7	Win	7–0	Harry Gopaul	UD	4	Aug 4, 2012	Seven Feathers Hotel & Casino Resort, Canyonville, Oregon, U.S.	
6	Win	6–0	Joseph Rabotte	MD	4	May 24, 2012	Twin River Event Center, Lincoln, Rhode Island, U.S.	
5	Win	5–0	Jae Bryce	UD	4	Nov 17, 2010	Challenge Stadium, Perth, Australia	
4	Win	4–0	Terry Adams	TKO	2 (4), 1:23	Nov 21, 2009	Fitzgerald's Casino & Hotel, Tunica, Mississippi, U.S.	
3	Win	3–0	Sugi Foxx	TKO	1 (4), 2:12	Oct 6, 2009	Omni New Daisy Theater, Memphis, Tennessee, U.S.	
2	Win	2–0	Larry Slayton	UD	4	Oct 3, 2009	Fitzgerald's Casino & Hotel, Tunica, Mississippi, U.S.	
1	Win	1–0	Marvin Hunt	KO	1 (4), 1:59	Aug 29, 2009	Fitzgerald's Casino & Hotel, Tunica, Mississippi, U.S.	

Preceded by Jason Estrada	United States Amateur Super Heavyweight Champion; 2004 - 2005	Succeeded by Jonte Willis
