= Denis Sergeev =

Russian boxer

Medal record

Representing Russia

Men's boxing

European Amateur Championships
Silver medal – second place	2008 Liverpool	Super Heavyweight

Denis Sergeyevich Sergeev or Denis Sergeyevich Sergeyev (Денис Сергеевич Сергеев; born March 21, 1982, in Vladimir Oblast, Russia) is a Russian amateur boxer who won the silver medal at the 2008 European Amateur Boxing Championships in the super heavyweight division.

== Career ==
Sergeev won a bronze in the 2005 Super-heavyweight Russian senior national championships losing 29:14 to Vladislav Vasilev and won a bronze again in 2006 losing to Magomed Abdusalamov in the semi-final by 49:44. The following year in 2007 he won the title beating European champion Islam Timurziev 22:19 in the final and followed the success up in 2008 beating Shamil Gadzhiyev to win the title.

In November 2007, Sergeev won the "Good Luck Beijing" International Boxing Tournament at the Beijing Workers' Indoor Arena, China, beating Michael Hunter of the USA 21-18 in the final.

=== European Amateur Championships 2008 ===
Sergeev represented Russia at the 2008 European Amateur Boxing Championships in Liverpool, England. He won a silver medal after being defeated in the final 9:2 by Bulgarian Kubrat Pulev. 2008 (as a Super heavyweight)

- Preliminary round Defeated Andrew Wyn Jones (Wales) RSC4
- Quarter-finals Defeated Mikhaili Sheibak (Belarus) 7-2
- Semi-finals Defeated Memnun Hadzic (Bosnia) RTD3
- Finals Lost to Kubrat Pulev (Bulgaria) 9-2

=== 2009 ===
At the 2009 World Amateur Boxing Championships he lost to Viktar Zuyev and didn't medal.
