= Iago Kiladze =

Ukrainian boxer (born 1986)

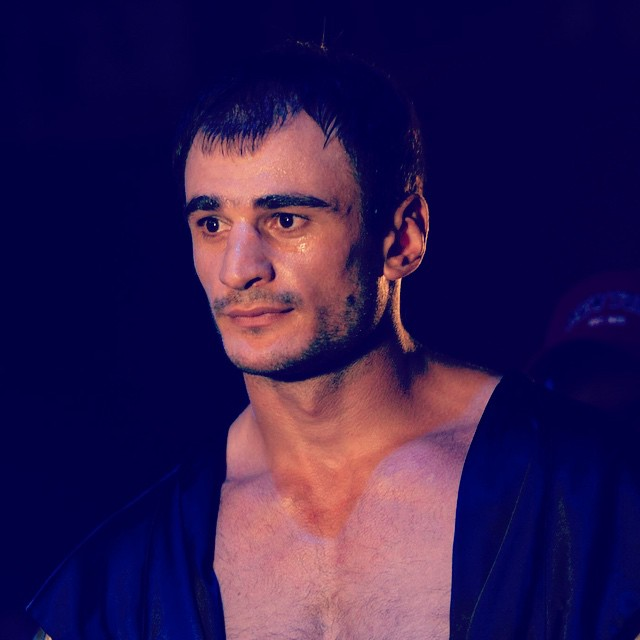

Personal information
- Nationality: Georgian (until 2006); Ukrainian (since 2007)
- Born: Яго Кіладзе; February 24, 1986 (age 40) Sachkhere, Georgian SSR, Soviet Union
- Height: 1.92 m (6 ft 4 in)
- Weight: Cruiserweight; Heavyweight

Boxing career
- Stance: Orthodox

Boxing record
- Total fights: 34
- Wins: 27
- Win by KO: 19
- Losses: 6
- Draws: 1

Iago Kiladze (Ukrainian: Яго Кіладзе) is a Georgian-Ukrainian former professional boxer who competed from 2007 to 2022. In his bout on 1 January 2022, Kiladze stumbled after getting up from a knockdown and official Samuel Burgos called the fight for Kiladze's opponent.

== Professional boxing record ==
34 fights	27 wins	6 losses
By knockout	19	6
By decision	8	0
Draws	1	

No.	Result	Record	Opponent	Type	Round, time	Date	Location	Notes
34	Loss	27–6–1	Victor Vykhryst	TKO	2 (8), 1:44	1 Jan 2022	Seminole Hard Rock Hotel and Casino, Hollywood, Florida, USA	
33	Win	27–5–1	Mathew McKinney	TKO	2 (8), 2:27	5 Sep 2021	Armory, Minneapolis, Minnesota, USA	
32	Loss	26–5–1	Efe Ajagba	KO	5 (10), 2:09	21 Dec 2019	Toyota Arena, Ontario, California, USA	
31	Draw	26–4–1	Robert Alfonso	SD	8	18 May 2019	Barclays Center, Brooklyn, New York, USA	
30	Loss	26–4	Joe Joyce	KO	5 (10), 0:41	30 Sep 2018	Citizens Business Bank Arena, Ontario, California, USA	
29	Loss	26–3	Michael Hunter	KO	5 (10), 2:52	10 Jun 2018	Pioneer Event Center, Lancaster, California, USA	
28	Loss	26–2	Adam Kownacki	KO	6 (10), 2:08	20 Jan 2018	Barclays Center, Brooklyn, New York, USA	
27	Win	26–1	Pedro Julio Rodriguez	TKO	2 (8), 1:18	4 Nov 2017	Barclays Center, Brooklyn, New York, USA	
26	Win	25–1	Byron Polley	KO	1 (8), 2:11	25 Feb 2017	Legacy Arena, Birmingham, Alabama, USA	
25	Win	24–1	Lukasz Rusiewicz	UD	8	13 Jun 2015	Budivelnik, Cherkasy, Ukraine	
24	Win	23–1	Rayford Johnson	TKO	4 (8), 2:59	25 Apr 2015	Madison Square Garden, New York City, New York, USA	
23	Win	22–1	Bjoern Blaschke	TKO	3 (8), 1:37	15 Nov 2014	O2 World Arena, Altona, Germany	
22	Win	21–1	Attila Palko	TKO	3 (8), 1:25	12 Apr 2014	Ice Palace "Terminal", Brovari, Ukraine	
21	Loss	20–1	Youri Kayembre Kalenga	KO	2 (10), 2:10	8 Jun 2013	Max Schmeling Halle, Prenzlauer Berg, Germany	
20	Win	20–0	Ismail Abdoul	UD	12	10 Nov 2012	Sport Palace “Druzhba”, Donetsk, Ukraine	Retained WBA Inter-Continental cruiserweight title
19	Win	19–0	Julien Perriaux	KO	2 (12), 1:15	29 Apr 2012	Donbass Arena, Donetsk, Ukraine	Retained WBA Inter-Continental cruiserweight title
18	Win	18–0	Jozsef Nagy	TKO	2 (12), 2:11	10 Jan 2012	Sport Palace “Druzhba”, Donetsk, Ukraine	Retained WBA Inter-Continental cruiserweight title
17	Win	17–0	Daniel Alejandro Sanabria	UD	12	26 Aug 2011	Donbass Arena, Donetsk, Ukraine	Retained WBA Inter-Continental cruiserweight title
16	Win	16–0	Zoltan Czekus	KO	1 (12), 2:45	14 Jan 2011	Circus, Donetsk, Ukraine	Won vacant WBA Inter-Continental cruiserweight title
15	Win	15–0	Arturs Kulikauskis	UD	10	30 Aug 2010	Lenin Square, Donetsk, Ukraine	Retained WBC Youth Intercontinental cruiserweight title
14	Win	14–0	Sergey Shitikov	TKO	2 (8), 1:45	14 May 2010	Sportpalace Dinamo, Donetsk, Ukraine	
13	Win	13–0	Matthias Sandow	TKO	2 (10), 1:35	20 Feb 2010	Sport Palace “Druzhba”, Donetsk, Ukraine	Retained WBC Youth Intercontinental cruiserweight title
12	Win	12–0	Denis Simkin	UD	6	24 Dec 2009	Sportpalace Dinamo, Donetsk, Ukraine	
11	Win	11–0	Isroiljon Kurbanov	UD	10	3 Oct 2009	Sport Palace “Druzhba”, Donetsk, Ukraine	Won vacant WBC Youth Intercontinental cruiserweight title
10	Win	10–0	Yurii Horbenko	TKO	3 (8), 1:57	26 Jun 2009	Sportpalace Dinamo, Donetsk, Ukraine	
9	Win	9–0	Dzmitry Adamovich	TKO	3 (8), 1:08	10 Apr 2009	Sport Palace “Druzhba”, Donetsk, Ukraine	
8	Win	8–0	Vyacheslav Titenko	TKO	1 (8), 2:45	30 Jan 2009	Sportpalace Dinamo, Donetsk, Ukraine	
7	Win	7–0	Oleksiy Karpenko	UD	4	19 Nov 2008	Sport Palace “Druzhba”, Donetsk, Ukraine	
6	Win	6–0	Ruslan Semenov	UD	8	8 Jul 2008	Sport Palace “Druzhba”, Donetsk, Ukraine	
5	Win	5–0	Valery Makeev	TKO	4 (8)	6 May 2008	Sportpalace Dinamo, Donetsk, Ukraine	
4	Win	4–0	Evgeny Shelest	KO	2 (6)	25 Mar 2008	Sport Palace “Druzhba”, Donetsk, Ukraine	
3	Win	3–0	Nikolay Aksenenko	TKO	3 (6)	15 Dec 2007	Sport Palace “Druzhba”, Donetsk, Ukraine	
2	Win	2–0	Viktor Lysenko	TKO	2 (6)	19 Oct 2007	Sergey Bubka School of Olympic Reserve, Donetsk, Ukraine	
1	Win	1–0	Alexander Obozov	TKO	4 (4)	21 Aug 2007	Lenin Square, Donetsk, Ukraine	
