= Roman Kapitonenko =

Ukrainian boxer

Personal information
- Full name: Роман Капітоненко
- Nationality: Ukraine
- Born: 21 January 1981 (age 45) Shostka, Sumy Oblast, Ukrainian SSR, Soviet Union

Sport
- Sport: Boxing
- Weight class: Super Heavyweight
Medal record
European Amateur Championships
Bronze medal – third place	2008 Liverpool	Super Heavyweight
Bronze medal – third place	2010 Moscow	Super Heavyweight
World Amateur Championships
Silver medal – second place	2009 Milan	Super Heavyweight

Roman Kapitanenko (Ukrainian: Роман Анатолійович Капітоненко; born 21 January 1981) is a Ukrainian amateur boxer who won the bronze medal at the European Championships 2008. He benefitted from Vyacheslav Glazkov's decision to turn pro. He beat Vladimir Prusa and Yousef Abdelghani before losing his semifinal 4:6 to Kubrat Pulev.

At the 2009 World Amateur Boxing Championships he defeated Erislandy Savón and Zhang Zhilei, but lost the final to Roberto Cammarelle.

He won the bronze medal at the 2010 European Amateur Boxing Championships at Moscow, Russia after he lost to Viktor Zuyev from Belarus in the Semifinals.
