= Vyacheslav Glazkov =

Ukrainian boxer

Vyacheslav Glazkove В'ячеслав Глазков
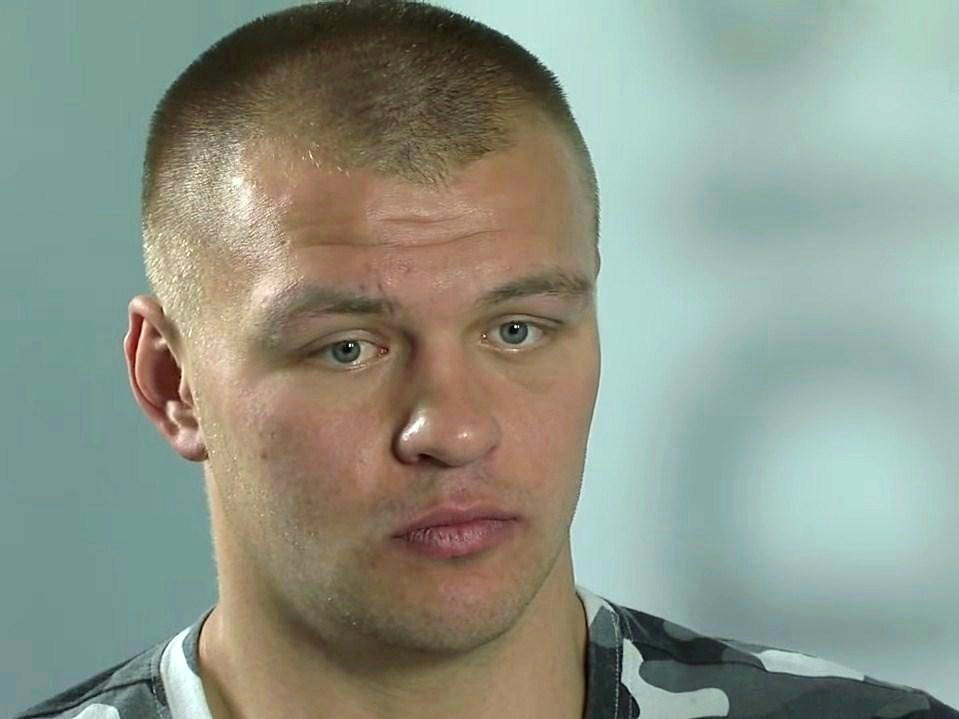

Personal information
- Nickname: The Czar
- Born: Vyacheslav Valerіyovich Glazkov; 15 October 1984 (age 42) Luhansk, Ukrainian SSR, Soviet Union (now Ukraine)
- Height: 1.88 m (6 ft 2 in)
- Weight: Heavyweight

Boxing career
- Reach: 192 cm (75.5 in)
- Stance: Orthodox

Boxing record
- Total fights: 23
- Wins: 21
- Win by KO: 13
- Losses: 1
- Draws: 1
Medal record
Men's boxing
Representing Ukraine
Olympic Games
Bronze medal – third place	2008 Beijing	Super heavyweight
World Amateur Championships
Silver medal – second place	2007 Chicago	Super heavyweight
World University Championships
Gold medal – first place	2004 Antalya	Heavyweight

Vyacheslav Valeriyovych Glazkov (Ukrainian: В'ячеслав Валерійович Глазков, born 15 October 1984) is a Ukrainian former professional boxer who competed from 2009 to 2016. He challenged once for the IBF heavyweight world title in 2016. As an amateur, he won a silver medal at the 2007 World Championships and bronze at the 2008 Olympics.

== Amateur career ==
Glazkov won a gold medal at heavyweight in the first 2004 World University Boxing Championship by stopping Elchin Alizade.

He then moved up to super-heavyweight to compete in the 2005 World Amateur Boxing Championships where he outpointed Jaroslav Jaksto 26:20, but ran into the eventual winner Odlanier Solís early and lost 26:11.

At the 2006 Strandya Cup he beat David Price by RSCO (Referee Stopped the Contest-Outclassed), then lost by walkover to Kubrat Pulev.

At the 2007 World Amateur Boxing Championships, he out-pointed Colombian Oscar Rivas 23:7, stopped Jaroslav Jaksto, and defeated Chinese Zhang Zhilei 21:11 before losing in the semi-finals by 14:24 to the eventual winner, Italian southpaw Roberto Cammarelle.

=== Olympic results ===
2008 (as a super heavyweight)

- Defeated Robert Alfonso (Cuba) 5:3
- Defeated Newfel Ouatah (Algeria) 10:4
- Lost to Zhang Zhilei (China) walkover, pulled out of bout with elbow injury.

=== World Amateur Championship results ===
2005 (as a super heavyweight)

- Defeated Jaroslavas Jaksto (Lithuania) 26:20
- Lost to Odlanier Solís (Cuba) 11:26

2007 (as a super heavyweight)

- Defeated Răzvan Cojanu (Romania) RSCO 2
- Defeated Oscar Rivas (Colombia) 23:7
- Defeated Jaroslavas Jaksto (Lithuania) RSC 3
- Defeated Zhang Zhilei (China) 21 11
- Lost to Roberto Cammarelle (Italy) 14:24 (gold medal match)

== Professional career ==
Glazkov made his professional debut on July 2, 2009 in Moscow. Nearly six years later, Glazkov defeated Steve Cunningham by unanimous decision on March 15, 2015 to earn a title fight against Tyson Fury. Following a petition from Glazkov's camp, Fury's recognition as IBF champion was withdrawn, citing his intention to fight a rematch with Wladimir Klitschko as the reason. Glazkov was matched with Charles Martin for the vacant title. The bout, which took place on January 16, 2016 at Barclays Center in Brooklyn, ended when Glazkov suffered an injury to his knee in the third round that rendered him unable to continue. The injury eventually forced him to retire from the sport.

== Professional boxing record ==
23 fights	21 wins	1 loss
By knockout	13	1
By decision	8	0
Draws	1	

No.	Result	Record	Opponent	Type	Round, time	Date	Location	Notes
23	Loss	21–1–1	Charles Martin	TKO	3 (12), 1:50	16 Jan 2016	Barclays Center, Brooklyn, New York, US	For vacant IBF heavyweight title
22	Win	21–0–1	Kertson Manswell	KO	4 (10), 1:33	15 Aug 2015	Basket Hall, Krasnodar, Russia	
21	Win	20–0–1	Steve Cunningham	UD	12	14 Mar 2015	Bell Centre, Montreal, Quebec, Canada	Won USBA heavyweight title
20	Win	19–0–1	Darnell Wilson	RTD	7 (10), 3:00	8 Nov 2014	Boardwalk Hall, Atlantic City, New Jersey, US	
19	Win	18–0–1	Derric Rossy	MD	10	9 Aug 2014	Sands Casino Resort Bethlehem, Pennsylvania, US	
18	Win	17–0–1	Tomasz Adamek	UD	12	15 Mar 2014	Sands Casino Resort, Bethlehem, Pennsylvania, US	Won IBF North American heavyweight title
17	Win	16–0–1	Garrett Wilson	UD	10	16 Nov 2013	Turning Stone Casino, Verona, New York, US	
16	Win	15–0–1	Byron Polley	TKO	2 (8), 0:30	3 Aug 2013	Mohegan Sun Casino, Uncasville, Connecticut, US	
15	Draw	14–0–1	Malik Scott	SD	10	23 Feb 2013	Paramount Theatre, Huntington, New York, US	
14	Win	14–0	Tor Hamer	RTD	4 (8), 3:00	22 Dec 2012	Sands Casino Resort, Bethlehem, Pennsylvania, US	
13	Win	13–0	Konstantin Airich	UD	10	8 Sep 2012	Olympic Stadium, Moscow, Russia	Won vacant WBC Baltic Silver heavyweight title
12	Win	12–0	Gbenga Oloukun	TKO	7 (10), 1:32	1 May 2012	Krylatskoye Sports Palace, Moscow, Russia	
11	Win	11–0	Evgeny Orlov	RTD	5 (10), 3:00	16 Mar 2012	Circus, Krasnodar, Russia	
10	Win	10–0	Daniil Peretyatko	RTD	5 (8), 3:00	4 Nov 2011	Megasport Arena, Moscow, Russia	
9	Win	9–0	Denis Bakhtov	UD	8	26 Mar 2011	DIVS, Yekaterinburg, Russia	
8	Win	8–0	Asker Balash	RTD	3 (6), 3:00	4 Dec 2010	Ice Arena Terminal, Brovary, Ukraine	
7	Win	7–0	Aziz Rahmonov	RTD	2 (6), 3:00	16 Oct 2010	Trading-Entertaining Center "Alatyr", Yekaterinburg, Russia	
6	Win	6–0	Mark Brown	TKO	3 (6)	14 Jul 2010	South Philly Arena, Philadelphia, Pennsylvania, US	
5	Win	5–0	Ivan Shvayko	RTD	3 (6), 3:00	24 Apr 2010	Palace of Sports, Kyiv, Ukraine	
4	Win	4–0	Ramon Hayes	TKO	3 (4), 1:58	12 Mar 2010	Sosua Bay Grand Casino, Puerto Plata, Dominican Republic	
3	Win	3–0	Stas Bilokon	RTD	1 (4), 3:00	19 Dec 2009	Yunist Sport Palace, Zaporizhzhia, Ukraine	
2	Win	2–0	Alexey Varakin	UD	4	24 Oct 2009	Sverdlovsk Film Studio, Yekaterinburg, Russia	
1	Win	1–0	Özcan Cetinkaya	UD	4	2 Jul 2009	Krylatskoye Sports Palace, Moscow, Russia	
