= Jaroslavas Jakšto =

Lithuanian boxer (born 1980)

Personal information
- Full name: Jaroslavas Jakšto
- Nationality: Lithuania
- Born: August 7, 1980 (age 45) Vilnius
- Height: 1.94 m (6 ft 4 in)
- Weight: 101 kg (223 lb)

Sport
- Sport: Boxing
- Weight class: Super-Heavyweight
- Club: VOSC, Vilnius
Medal record
European Amateur Championships
Bronze medal – third place	2004 Pula	Super Heavyweight

Jaroslavas Jakšto (born 7 August 1980) is a male amateur boxer from Lithuania best known for winning super heavyweight bronze at the 2004 European Amateur Boxing Championships in Pula, Croatia. He was a 2004 Olympian and also qualified for the 2008 Olympics.

== Career ==
Jakšto won a bronze medal in the same division at the 2004 European Amateur Boxing Championships in Pula, Croatia.

He also participated in the 2004 Summer Olympics. He beat there Victor Bisbal 27-16 but was defeated in the second round of the Super heavyweight (+91 kg) division by Egypt's eventual runner-up Mohamed Aly.

He won the Chemiepokal Cup in Germany 2005 by beating Michel López Núñez 17:12 and the Military world championships in 2006.

At the World Championships 2007 he lost to Vyacheslav Glazkov inside the distance.

At the first Olympic qualifier he lost to Kubrat Pulev, at the second qualifier he beat Robert Helenius and Yousef Abdelghani to qualify. In Beijing he lost to David Price when he had to quit with a leg injury after the first round, he was trailing 1:3.
