= Copa Independencia =

Copa Independencia 2007
Tournament details
- Host country: United States
- Dates: September 26
- Teams: 4 (from 1 confederation)
- Venue: 1 (in 1 host city)

Final positions
- Champions: (Mexico) Club Santos Laguna (1st title)
- Runners-up: (Honduras) Club Deportivo Marathón

Tournament statistics
- Matches played: 3

The inaugural Copa Independencia tournament was held on September 26, 2007 at the Los Angeles Memorial Coliseum. The tournament featured clubs from El Salvador, Guatemala, Honduras, and Mexico.

== Competing clubs ==
- (El Salvador) Club Deportivo FAS
- (Guatemala) Club Deportivo Marquense
- (Honduras) Club Deportivo Marathón
- (Mexico) Club Santos Laguna

== Tournament Format ==
The tournament is a one-day, two round event where the two winning teams of the first round face off in a second round penalty shoot out to determine the champion.

=== First round ===
September 26, 2007

| Club Deportivo Marathón | 0-0 (4-1 pens) | Deportivo Marquense |

Los Angeles Memorial Coliseum
September 26, 2007

| Club Deportivo FAS | 0-2 | Club Santos Laguna |

Los Angeles Memorial Coliseum

=== Second round ===
| Season | Host | Winner | Score | Runner Up |
|---|---|---|---|---|
| 2007 | United States | (Mexico) Club Santos Laguna | 5-4 pens | (Honduras) Club Deportivo Marathón |

=== Champion ===
Copa Independencia 2007 Winners
(Mexico)
Club Santos Laguna
First title

== See also ==
- Federación Mexicana de Fútbol
- Federación Nacional de Fútbol de Guatemala
- Federación Salvadoreña de Fútbol
- Liga Nacional de Fútbol de Honduras
