= Trevor Bryan =

American boxer (born 1989)

Personal information
- Nickname: The Dream
- Born: Trevor Cosmo Bryan Jr. August 23, 1989 (age 37) Albany, New York, U.S.
- Height: 6 ft 4 in (193 cm)
- Weight: Heavyweight

Boxing career
- Reach: 79 in (201 cm)
- Stance: Orthodox

Boxing record
- Total fights: 24
- Wins: 22
- Win by KO: 15
- Losses: 2

Trevor Cosmo Bryan Jr (born August 23, 1989) is an American professional boxer. He held the WBA (Regular) heavyweight title between 2021 and 2022.

== Early life ==
Trevor Bryan was born on August 23, 1989, in Albany, New York. He began boxing at the age of 11. He is trained by Stacey McKinley, a former trainer of Mike Tyson and promoted by boxing promoter Don King.

== Professional career ==
Bryan made his professional debut in May 2011 defeating Demarcus Young by RTD in the second round in Hollywood, Florida. In August 2015, Bryan beat Derric Rossy in Las Vegas, Nevada, and won the WBC-NABF Junior heavyweight title. Even though Bryan scored a first-round knockdown, Rossy proved to be a tricky opponent and the fight ended being very competitive and exciting until the last bell.

Bryan would go on to beat former cruiserweight title challenger BJ Flores to win the WBA interim heavyweight title.

Bryan was due to fight Mahmoud Charr on January 29, 2021, for his WBA (Regular) heavyweight title; however, Charr could not travel to fight as he did not have a valid United States visa. Due to this, Bryan instead fought former WBC champion Bermane Stiverne for the vacant title, which had been stripped from Charr due to being inactive for too long. Bryan knocked his opponent down twice and won the bout by eleventh-round technical knockout, becoming the WBA (Regular) champion.

Bryan lost his title when he was defeated by Daniel Dubois by knockout in the fourth round in front of approximately 500 spectators at Casino Miami in Florida on 11 June 2022 on a card promoted by Don King.

== Professional boxing record ==
24 fights	22 wins	2 losses
By knockout	15	2
By decision	7	0

No.	Result	Record	Opponent	Type	Round, time	Date	Location	Notes
24	Loss	22–2	Cassius Chaney	KO	7 (10), 2:03	Nov 4, 2023	Casino Miami, Miami, Florida, U.S.	
23	Loss	22–1	Daniel Dubois	KO	4 (12), 1:58	Jun 11, 2022	Casino Miami, Miami, Florida, U.S.	Lost WBA (Regular) heavyweight title
22	Win	22–0	Jonathan Guidry	SD	12	Jan 29, 2022	Packard Music Hall, Warren, Ohio, U.S.	Retained WBA (Regular) heavyweight title
21	Win	21–0	Bermane Stiverne	TKO	11 (12), 1:26	Jan 29, 2021	Seminole Hard Rock Hotel & Casino, Hollywood, Florida, U.S.	Won vacant WBA (Regular) heavyweight title
20	Win	20–0	BJ Flores	TKO	4 (12), 2:58	Aug 11, 2018	Celebrity Theatre, Phoenix, Arizona, U.S.	Won vacant WBA interim heavyweight title
19	Win	19–0	Francois Russell	TKO	3 (8), 2:27	Dec 15, 2017	Derby Park Expo, Louisville, Kentucky, U.S.	
18	Win	18–0	Sandy Soto	TKO	3 (6), 1:15	Apr 27, 2017	Casa de los Clubes, Santo Domingo, Dominican Republic	
17	Win	17–0	Galen Brown	UD	6	Jul 2, 2016	Teamsters Hall, Pittsburgh, Pennsylvania, U.S.	
16	Win	16–0	Derric Rossy	UD	10	Aug 28, 2015	The D Las Vegas, Paradise, Nevada, U.S.	Won vacant WBC-NABF Junior heavyweight title
15	Win	15–0	Stacy Frazier	RTD	2 (10), 3:00	Jun 20, 2015	Greensboro Coliseum, Greensboro, North Carolina, U.S.	
14	Win	14–0	Terrell Jamal Woods	UD	8	May 22, 2015	San Jose Fiesta, Nashville, Tennessee, U.S.	
13	Win	13–0	Epifanio Mendoza	RTD	5 (9), 3:00	Apr 11, 2015	Coliseo Elias Chegwin, Barranquilla, Colombia	Won vacant WBA Fedebol heavyweight title
12	Win	12–0	Eliecer Castillo	UD	6	Oct 24, 2014	Civic Center, Kissimmee, Florida, U.S.	
11	Win	11–0	Sandy Soto	KO	1 (10), 2:11	Sep 21, 2014	Coliseo Carlos 'Teo' Cruz, Santo Domingo, Dominican Republic	
10	Win	10–0	Jason Barnett	KO	1 (8), 1:31	Feb 21, 2014	Wolstein Center, Cleveland, Ohio, U.S.	
9	Win	9–0	Jesus Felix	TKO	2 (10), 0:31	Oct 19, 2013	Club Calero, Santo Domingo, Dominican Republic	
8	Win	8–0	Sandy Soto	TKO	2 (6), 2:49	May 24, 2013	Club Maquiteria, Santo Domingo, Dominican Republic	
7	Win	7–0	Alvaro Morales	UD	6	Apr 12, 2013	Treasure Island Hotel and Casino, Paradise, Nevada, U.S.	
6	Win	6–0	Aneudy Marte	TKO	3 (6), 3:00	Feb 16, 2013	Gimnasio Joan Guzman, Santo Domingo, Dominican Republic	
5	Win	5–0	Hassan Lee	KO	3 (6), 1:45	Nov 16, 2012	Casino Miami, Miami, Florida, U.S.	
4	Win	4–0	Hector Hodge	KO	1 (4), 0:34	Jun 23, 2012	Seminole Hard Rock Hotel & Casino, Hollywood, Florida, U.S.	
3	Win	3–0	Brandon Spencer	UD	4	Apr 14, 2012	Casino Miami, Miami, Florida, U.S.	
2	Win	2–0	Chris Barnett	KO	2 (4), 2:04	Feb 10, 2012	Community Center, Palm Bay, Florida, U.S.	
1	Win	1–0	Demarcus Young	RTD	2 (4), 3:00	Nov 5, 2011	Seminole Hard Rock Hotel & Casino, Hollywood, Florida, U.S.	

Sporting positions
Regional boxing titles
Vacant Title last held by Daniel Martz	WBC-NABF Junior heavyweight champion August 28, 2015 – July 2016	Vacant Title next held by LeRon Mitchell
World boxing titles
Vacant Title last held by Luis Ortiz	WBA heavyweight champion Interim title August 11, 2018 – January 29, 2021; Won regular title	Vacant Title next held by Daniel Dubois
Vacant Title last held by Mahmoud Charr	WBA heavyweight champion Regular title January 29, 2021 – June 11, 2022	Succeeded by Daniel Dubois
