= Jonte Willis =

American boxer (1983–2022)

Jonte Willis (October 18, 1983, in Memphis, Tennessee – January 4, 2022, in Tacoma, Washington) is a former American heavyweight boxer best known for winning the US amateur championships at super heavyweight in 2006. He retired with a negative record and health problems in 2014.

== Background ==
Adopted at the age of four months by Weldon and Dorothy Willis of Memphis, Tennessee. He is the youngest of five brothers and five sisters. He is cousin of 49er and NFL pro-bowler Patrick Willis. Jonte was raised in Bruceton, TN and attended Central's junior and senior high school. In the eighth grade, he was chosen as captain of the junior high school football team. In his senior year at Central High School, he captained the Tiger football team.

In July, 2014 he was arrested on charges of domestic-violence assault and felony harassment to his son's mother. According to the victim's account, he had recently suffered from a head injury that resulted in strange behavior by Willis.

== Amateur career ==
Willis started boxing in 2004. He won the US national championship in March 2006, initially he was the runner-up losing in the final to Mike Wilson 23–12. However, Wilson failed a drug test, and Willis was awarded the championship.[2] He also had a 2nd place showing at the 2006 Police Athletic League National Championships where he lost against Michael Hunter, 8–10.[3] Willis was KOd by Cuban's Olympic Champion Odlanier Solis Fonte in the 2006 World Cup tournament in October 2006 Baku. He outpointed Kazakh Alexander Makarov 18:7.[4]

He placed 2nd in the 2007 Pam Am Qualifier where he beat Hunter in a close fight 16-16(27–24) but could not compete against his old foe Mike Wilson due to illness.[5] He won the 2007 Tacoma Golden Gloves where he beat Canada's #2 ranked superheavy weight Brandon Lowrie and continued on to the 2007 Nevada Golden Gloves where he won again against Michael Hunter. At the National Golden Gloves, however, he was KOd in the semi-finals by Tyler Turner.[6]

At the 2007 US Championships he lost his first bout against Kimdo Bethel 13-13 (25–27).[7]

== Pro career ==
He turned pro in 2007 weighing 214 lbs and won his first 7 bouts but after his first loss in 2011 only won two more fights and piled up 10 losses. Willis is currently suspended from boxing indefinitely.

Preceded by Mike Wilson	United States Amateur Super Heavyweight Champion; 2006	Succeeded by Michael Hunter
