= Michael Hunter (American boxer) =

American boxer (born 1988)

Personal information
- Nickname: The Bounty Hunter
- Nationality: American
- Born: Michael Hunter, Jr. July 10, 1988 (age 38) Van Nuys, California, U.S.
- Height: 6 ft 2 in (188 cm)
- Weight: Cruiserweight; Heavyweight

Boxing career
- Reach: 79 1/2 in (202 cm)
- Stance: Orthodox

Boxing record
- Total fights: 28
- Wins: 25
- Win by KO: 18
- Losses: 1
- Draws: 2
Medal record
Men's amateur boxing
Representing United States
U.S. National Championships
Gold medal – first place	2012 Fort Carson	Heavyweight
World Junior Championships
Bronze medal – third place	2006 Agadir	Heavyweight
Representing California
Golden Gloves
Silver medal – second place	2006 Omaha	Super heavyweight
Gold medal – first place	2011 Indianapolis	Heavyweight

Michael Hunter, Jr. (born July 10, 1988) is an American professional boxer who challenged for the WBO junior heavyweight title in 2017. As an amateur, he won the National Championships as a super heavyweight in 2007 and 2009, and qualified for the 2012 Olympics in the heavyweight division. He is the son of late professional boxer Mike "the Bounty" Hunter.

== Amateur career ==
In 2006 at the age of 18 he made it to the finals of the National Golden Gloves with only five bouts where he lost to Felix Stewart and won the bronze medal at the Under-19 World Championships in Morocco by scoring wins over Andrey Volkov of Russia and Pavel Kulda of Lithuania before losing in the semifinals to eventual winner Cristian Ciocan of Romania.

In 2007 now based in Las Vegas he beat future (2008) champ Lenroy Thompson and narrowly outpointed two-time winner Mike Wilson to win the US championships.

At the Olympic trials 2007 he easily beat Wilson-conqueror Kimdo Bethel twice and won the tournament. At the World Championships 2007 he beat Kurban Günebakan 30:7 and Jasem Delavari and lost only 15:22 to world #1 and European champion Islam Timurziev.

At the first qualifier he beat Oscar Rivas but lost to Cuban Robert Alfonso 1:9, at the second he beat Didier Bence but lost to Jose Payares and thus failed to qualify for the 2008 Olympics.

In 2009 he edged out Thompson 8:7 and once again became national champ.

=== Heavyweight, 201 lbs ===
In 2011 he dropped down to 201 lbs and won the Golden Gloves title there.

In June 2011, Hunter helped Wladimir Klitschko in his preparation for his fight against David Haye, acting as his sparring partner in the last few weeks building up to the fight.

He managed to qualify for the London 2012 Olympics by winning his qualifier against Julio Castillo and Yamil Peralta. At the Olympics, he was eliminated in the first round by future professional world champion Artur Beterbiev who was at his second Olympics.

== Professional career ==
In March 2013 Hunter made his professional debut defeating Chad Davis by third-round TKO in a bout held in Phoenix, Arizona. He then scored another KO on August 30.

On April 8, 2017, Hunter fought his first career title fight, against Oleksandr Usyk (11–0) for the WBO cruiserweight title. Hunter boxed well in the beginning, but couldn't manage to land effectively on Usyk. Usyk, on the other hand, managed to hurt Hunter multiple times, almost knocking him out towards the end of the fight. Despite a courageous effort from Hunter, Usyk was declared the winner via unanimous decision.

On October 13, 2018, Hunter fought Martin Bakole, his biggest test at heavyweight up to that point. Bakole was visibly the bigger man of the two, but Hunter managed to outbox and hurt him during the fight, eventually stopping him in the final seconds of the tenth, and last, round.

In his next fight, Hunter fought veteran heavyweight Alexander Ustinov. Hunter wore Ustinov down by scoring two knockdowns, one in the eighth round and one in the ninth round, after which Ustinov's corner threw in the towel.

On September 13, 2019, Hunter, ranked #9 by the WBA, #10 by the IBF, #12 by the WBO and #14 by the WBC at heavyweight, fought Sergey Kuzmin (15–0), ranked #5 by the WBA and #7 by the IBF. Hunter got his sixth win in a row in convincing fashion, scoring 117–110 on all three judges' scorecards.

On December 7, 2019, on the undercard of Andy Ruiz Jr. vs. Anthony Joshua II, Hunter faced former WBA (Regular) heavyweight champion Alexander Povetkin. Povetkin was ranked #6 by the WBA and WBC and #10 by the IBF at heavyweight, while Hunter was ranked #7 by the WBA and IBF, #8 by the WBO and #14 by the WBA. Both fighters fought well and were aggressive at given points of the fight, making for a very entertaining bout. The fight would end up being a draw, one judge scoring the fight 115–113 in favor of Povetkin, one scoring it 115–113 for Hunter, while the third judge had it even, 114–114.

== Professional boxing record ==
27 fights	24 wins	1 loss
By knockout	17	0
By decision	7	1
Draws	2	

No.	Result	Record	Opponent	Type	Round, time	Date	Location	Notes
28	Win	25–1–2	Effrain Carranza Gonzalez	TKO	2 (8), 0:10	Aug 29, 2026	Tecate, Baja California, Mexico	
27	Win	24–1–2	Christian Larrondo Garcia	TKO	5 (10), 2:34	Dec 8, 2024	Tlaquepaque, Jalisco, Mexico	
26	Win	23–1–2	Cassius Chaney	UD	10	Jun 7, 2024	Seminole Hard Rock Hotel and Casino, Hollywood, Florida, U.S.	Won vacant WBA Gold heavyweight title
25	Win	22–1–2	Ignacio Esparza	TKO	5 (10), 0:10	Mar 23, 2024	Zapopan, Mexico	
24	Win	21–1–2	Miguel Cubos	TKO	2 (10), 0:42	Sep 30, 2023	Tlajomulco de Zúñiga, Mexico	
23	Draw	20–1–2	Jerry Forrest	SD	10	Dec 2, 2021	Hammerstein Ballroom, New York City, New York, U.S.	
22	Win	20–1–1	Mike Wilson	TKO	4 (12), 2:49	Aug 3, 2021	Hulu Theater, New York City, New York, U.S.	Won vacant WBA Continental Americas heavyweight title
21	Win	19–1–1	Shawn Laughery	KO	4 (10), 1:02	Dec 18, 2020	Island Convention Center, Galveston, Texas, U.S.	
20	Draw	18–1–1	Alexander Povetkin	SD	12	Dec 7, 2019	Diriyah Arena, Diriyah, Saudi Arabia	
19	Win	18–1	Sergey Kuzmin	UD	12	Sep 13, 2019	Hulu Theater, New York City, New York, U.S.	Won WBA Inter-Continental heavyweight title
18	Win	17–1	Fábio Maldonado	TKO	2 (10), 1:45	May 25, 2019	MGM National Harbor, Oxon Hill, Maryland, U.S.	Retained WBA International heavyweight title
17	Win	16–1	Alexander Ustinov	TKO	9 (12), 1:52	Nov 24, 2018	Casino de Salle Medecin, Monte Carlo, Monaco	Won vacant WBA International heavyweight title
16	Win	15–1	Martin Bakole	TKO	10 (10), 2:19	Oct 13, 2018	York Hall, London, England	Won vacant IBO Inter-Continental heavyweight title
15	Win	14–1	Iago Kiladze	KO	5 (10), 2:52	Jun 10, 2018	Pioneer Event Center, Lancaster, California, U.S.	
14	Win	13–1	Terrell Jamal Woods	UD	6	Apr 21, 2018	International Plaza, Biloxi, Mississippi, U.S.	
13	Loss	12–1	Oleksandr Usyk	UD	12	Apr 8, 2017	MGM National Harbor, Oxon Hill, Maryland, U.S.	For WBO cruiserweight title
12	Win	12–0	Isiah Thomas	UD	10	May 13, 2016	Sam's Town Las Vegas, Sunrise Manor, Nevada, U.S.	Won vacant WBO–NABO cruiserweight title
11	Win	11–0	Phil Williams	KO	1 (8), 2:44	Feb 27, 2016	Honda Center, Anaheim, California, U.S.	
10	Win	10–0	Jason Douglas	RTD	4 (10), 3:00	Oct 13, 2015	Little Creek Casino Resort, Shelton, Washington, U.S.	
9	Win	9–0	Mike Bissett	TKO	1 (8), 1:11	Jul 25, 2015	Palms Casino Resort, Paradise, Nevada, U.S.	
8	Win	8–0	Deon Elam	TKO	4 (6), 1:23	Jun 20, 2015	MGM Grand Garden Arena, Paradise, Nevada, U.S.	
7	Win	7–0	Avery Gibson	UD	8	Feb 5, 2015	The Hangar, Costa Mesa, California, U.S.	
6	Win	6–0	Harvey Jolly	TKO	4 (6), 0:53	Aug 22, 2014	Pechanga Resort & Casino, Temecula, California, U.S.	
5	Win	5–0	Jerry Forrest	UD	8	Jun 21, 2014	StubHub Center, Carson, California, U.S.	
4	Win	4–0	Rodney Hernandez	UD	6	Apr 3, 2014	Fantasy Springs Resort Casino, Indio, California, U.S.	
3	Win	3–0	Gary Tapusoa	TKO	2 (4), 1:41	Jan 24, 2014	Little Creek Casino Resort, Shelton, Washington, U.S.	
2	Win	2–0	Francisco Mireles	KO	1 (4), 0:59	Aug 30, 2013	Sheraton Hotels and Resorts, San Diego, California, U.S.	
1	Win	1–0	Chad Davis	TKO	3 (4), 2:59	Mar 9, 2013	Celebrity Theatre, Phoenix, Arizona, U.S.	

== Exhibition boxing record ==
1 fight	0 wins	1 loss
By decision	0	1

No.	Result	Record	Opponent	Type	Round, time	Date	Location	Notes
1	Loss	0–1	Artem Suslenkov	UD	8	Apr 14, 2024	Humo Arena, Tashkent, Uzbekistan	

Sporting positions
Amateur boxing titles
Previous: Jonte Willis	U.S. super heavyweight champion 2007	Next: Lenroy Thompson
Previous: Lenroy Thompson	U.S. super heavyweight champion 2009	Next: Lenroy Thompson
Previous: Jordan Shimmell	U.S. heavyweight champion 2012	Next: King Alexander
Regional boxing titles
Vacant Title last held by BJ Flores	WBO–NABO junior heavyweight champion 13 May 2016 – 8 April 2017; Lost bid for world title	Vacant
