= Robert Alfonso =

Cuban boxer

Personal information
- Nickname: El Laberinto ("The Labyrinth")
- Nationality: Cuba
- Born: November 11, 1986 (age 39) Havana, Cuba
- Height: 1.93 m (6 ft 4 in)
- Weight: Heavyweight

Boxing career

Boxing record
- Total fights: 21
- Wins: 19
- Win by KO: 9
- Losses: 1
- Draws: 1
Medal record
Pan American Games
Gold medal – first place	2007 Rio de Janeiro	Super Heavyweight

Robert Leosdan Alfonso Acea (born November 11, 1986) is a Cuban professional boxer. He is best known for his victory at the 2007 Pan American games in the super heavyweight division.

== Career ==
Alfonso beat Newfel Ouatah but lost to Russian Evgeny Romanov at the world junior championships 2004 (semifinal).

He was also defeated nationally by compatriot superstar Odlanier Solis twice in 2004 at 201 lbs and later went up to super heavy.

He became the Cuban #1 only after Solis (who had gone up in weight, too) defected and he beat veteran Michel López Núñez in the National Championships 2007 and 2008.

He immediately won a major title, in the Pan American Games in Rio, beating Brazilian Antônio Rogério Nogueira 4:0 in the semis and Colombian Oscar Rivas 8:4 in the finals .

He qualified for the 2008 Olympics by beating young American Michael Hunter jr. in the final of their qualifier 9:1.

He lost his first Olympic bout 3:5 to Ukrainian Vyacheslav Glazkov.

He immigrated to the United States in 2012 to begin his professional career. He fought out of Miami, Florida for three years achieving a professional record of 6-0 (2 KO). After his late manager Si Stern's passing in 2015, Robert went a full year without a fight.

He made a strong comeback on June 25, 2016 with a knockout against Charles Daughtry 0:24 seconds into the first round.

He went on to win 3 additional fights from July to September 2016, all by way of unanimous decision.

His winning continued into 2017 with a first-round TKO over Keith Thompson at the BJCC in Birmingham, Alabama on the undercard of Deontay Wilder vs. Gerald Washington on February 25.

His next win came on May 12, 2017 at the inaugural Alabama Boxing Hall of Fame show in Tuscaloosa, Alabama. He landed several big hits against opponent Roberto Santos (12-4) throughout the first and second rounds, causing Santos to forfeit at the end of the second round. This was the first stoppage of Santos's career as his four losses up to that point had come by unanimous decision.

Alfonso earned a shot at his first title fight on August 11, 2017. The planned opponent was Devon Vargas, the heavyweight that represented the U.S in the 2004 Summer Olympics. A few weeks out, Vargas broke his jaw, and Birmingham's Jason Bergman stepped in as the new opponent. The fight took place in Tuscaloosa, Alabama, and the winner was to take home the vacant USBA Southern Region Heavyweight Title sanctioned by the IBF. Robert emerged victorious by unanimous decision after a tough ten-round battle.

He finished the year with a six-round unanimous decision victory over opponent Ronny Hale in Alexandria, Louisiana.

He currently splits his training time between Dallas, TX, and Tuscaloosa, AL.

== Professional boxing record ==
21 fights	19 wins	1 loss
By knockout	9	1
By decision	10	0
Draws	1	

No.	Result	Record	Opponent	Type	Round, time	Date	Location	Notes
21	Loss	19–1–1	(Puerto Rico) Carlos Negrón	TKO	1 (8)	2020-03-07	(United States) Barclays Center, Brooklyn, New York, USA	
20	Win	19–0–1	(United States) Steven Lyons	TKO	3 (6)	2019-08-03	(United States) Bobby Miller Center, Tuscaloosa, Alabama, USA	
19	Draw	18–0–1	(Georgia (country)) Iago Kiladze	SD	8	2019-05-18	(United States) Barclays Center, Brooklyn, New York, USA	
18	Win	18–0	(United States) Ray Austin	UD	6	2019-02-15	(United States) Tuscaloosa Rivermarket, Tuscaloosa, Alabama, USA	
17	Win	17–0	(United States) Rodney Moore	RTD	6 (8)	2018-09-22	(United States) Whataburger Field, Corpus Christi, Texas, USA	
16	Win	16–0	(United States) Mike Bissett	KO	2 (8)	2018-05-25	(United States) Tuscaloosa Rivermarket, Tuscaloosa, Alabama, USA	
15	Win	15–0	(United States) Quincy Palmer	TKO	2 (6)	2018-04-14	(United States) Texarkana Convention Center, Texarkana, Arkansas, USA	
14	Win	14–0	(United States) Deon Ronny Hale	UD	6	2017-12-29	(United States) Rapides Coliseum, Alexandria, Louisiana, USA	
13	Win	13–0	(United States) Jason Bergman	UD	10	2017-08-11	(United States) Belk Center, Tuscaloosa, Alabama, USA	Won vacant USBA Southern Region heavyweight Title
12	Win	12–0	(Mexico) Roberto Santos	TKO	2 (8)	2017-05-12	(United States) Tuscaloosa Rivermarket, Tuscaloosa, Alabama, USA	
11	Win	11–0	(United States) Keith Thompson	TKO	1 (8)	2017-02-25	(United States) Legacy Arena, Birmingham, Alabama, USA	
10	Win	10–0	(United States) Willie Herring	UD	6	2016-09-03	(United States) Hard Rock Casino, Biloxi, Mississippi, USA	
9	Win	9–0	(United States) Shamarian Snider	UD	6	2016-08-12	(United States) Bobby Miller Center, Tuscaloosa, Alabama, USA	
8	Win	8–0	(United States) Terrell Jamal Woods	UD	6	2016-07-16	(United States) Legacy Arena, Birmingham, Alabama, USA	
7	Win	7–0	(United States) Charles Daughtry	KO	1 (4)	2016-06-25	(United States) Jackson County Civic Center, Pascagoula, Mississippi, USA	
6	Win	6–0	(United States) Gary Kelly	TKO	3 (4)	2015-06-20	(United States) Riverdale Center of Arts, Riverdale, Georgia, USA	
5	Win	5–0	(United States) Raymond Lopez	TKO	3 (4)	2015-03-26	(United States) Hialeah Park Race Track, Hialeah, Florida, USA	
4	Win	4–0	(United States) Zakki Scott	UD	6	2014-02-21	(United States) Shipley Arena, Westminster, Maryland, USA	
3	Win	3–0	(United States) Terrell Jamal Woods	UD	4	2013-11-12	(United States) Seminole Hard Rock Hotel and Casino, Hollywood, Florida, USA	
2	Win	2–0	(United States) Robert Dunton	UD	4	2013-06-28	(United States) Civic Center, Kissimmee, Florida, USA	
1	Win	1–0	(United States) Robert Murray	UD	4	2012-12-07	(United States) Civic Center, Kissimmee, Florida, USA	Professional debut
