= 2011 World Amateur Boxing Championships – Super heavyweight =

Boxing competitions

The Super heavyweight competition was the heaviest class featured at the 2011 World Amateur Boxing Championships, held at the Heydar Aliyev Sports and Exhibition Complex. Boxers were not limited to a maximum kilograms in body mass.

== Medalists ==
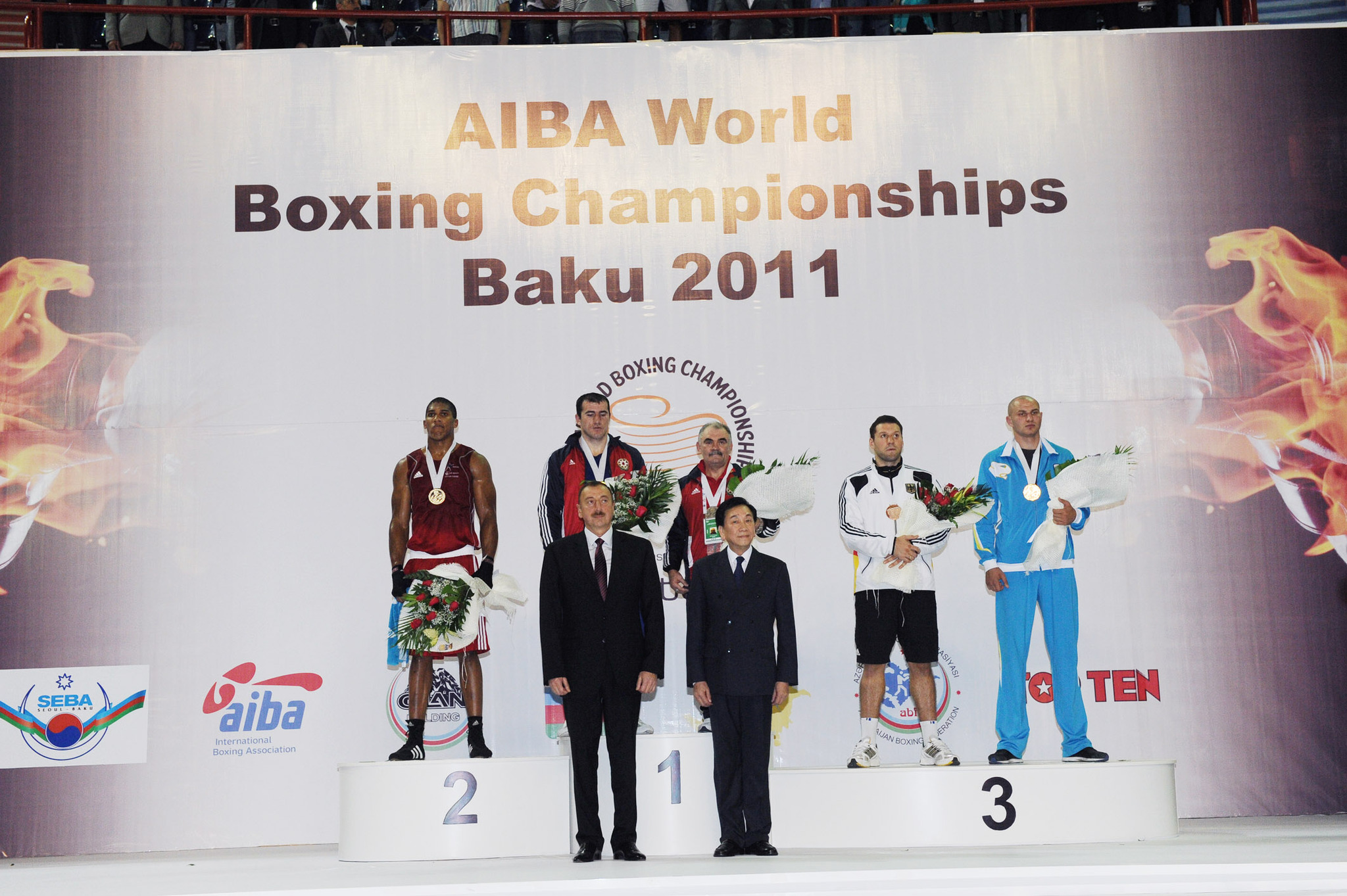
Awards ceremony celebrating winners, left-to-right: Anthony Joshua, Magomedrasul Majidov (with his trainer Yevgeniy Kotov,) Erik Pfeifer, Ivan Dychko

Gold	Magomedrasul Majidov (AZE)
Silver	Anthony Joshua (ENG)
Bronze	Erik Pfeifer (GER)
Bronze	Ivan Dychko (KAZ)

== Seeds ==
1. (Italy) Roberto Cammarelle (quarterfinals)
2. (Azerbaijan) Magomedrasul Majidov (champion)
3. (Croatia) Filip Hrgovic (quarterfinals)
4. (Belarus) Viktar Zuyev (quarterfinals)
5. (Ukraine) Roman Kapitonenko (third round)
6. (China) Zhang Zhilei (third round)
7. (France) Tony Yoka (third round)
8. (Mexico) Juan Hiracheta (second round)
9. (Morocco) Mohamed Arjaoui (third round)
10. (Cuba) Erislandy Savón (quarterfinals)

== Draw ==
=== Finals ===
Semifinals
1	Anthony Joshua (ENG)	RSCI
4	Erik Pfeifer (GER)
3	Ivan Dychko (KAZ)	9
2	Magomedrasul Majidov (AZE)	16

Final
Anthony Joshua (ENG)	21
Magomedrasul Majidov (AZE)	22

=== Top half ===
==== Section 1 ====
First round
José Payares (VEN)	RSCI
Uaine Fa (TON)
Tariq Abdul Haqq (TRI)
Anthony Joshua (ENG)	RSCI

Second round
Roberto Cammarelle (ITA)	17
José Payares (VEN)	8
Cornelius Sheehan (IRL)	RSC
Farukh Kalonov (TJK)
Mohamed Arjaoui (MAR)	12
Sergey Kuzmin (RUS)	9
Anthony Joshua (ENG)
Juan Hiracheta (MEX)	RET

Third round
Roberto Cammarelle (ITA)
Cornelius Sheehan (IRL)	RET
Mohamed Arjaoui (MAR)	7
Anthony Joshua (ENG)	16

Quarterfinals
Roberto Cammarelle (ITA)	13
Anthony Joshua (ENG)	15

==== Section 2 ====
First round
Dominik Musil (CZE)	DSQ
Blaise Yepmou Mendouo (CMR)
Vitalijus Subačius (LTU)	14
Paramjeet Samota (IND)	12

Second round
Roman Kapitonenko (UKR)	RSC
Blaise Yepmou Mendouo (CMR)
Patryk Brzeski (POL)	9
Erik Pfeifer (GER)	30
Alexey Mukhin (AUS)	9
Lenroy Thompson (USA)	18
Vitalijus Subačius (LTU)	8
Viktar Zuyev (BLR)	16

Third round
Roman Kapitonenko (UKR)	14
Erik Pfeifer (GER)	22
Lenroy Thompson (USA)	15
Viktar Zuyev (BLR)	18

Quarterfinals
Erik Pfeifer (GER)	18
Viktar Zuyev (BLR)	15

=== Bottom half ===
==== Section 3 ====
First round
Mikheil Bakhtidze (GEO)	15
Primislav Dimovski (MKD)	10
Joseph Parker (NZL)	14
Nikita Maculevics (LAT)	10

Second round
Filip Hrgović (CRO)
Mikheil Bakhtidze (GEO)	RET
Mihai Nistor (ROU)	KO
Bence Bouquet (HUN)
Ivan Dychko (KAZ)	14
Milutin Stanković (SRB)	2
Joseph Parker (NZL)	7
Zhang Zhilei (CHN)	15

Third round
Filip Hrgović (CRO)	22
Mihai Nistor (ROU)	10
Ivan Dychko (KAZ)	13
Zhang Zhilei (CHN)	7

Quarterfinals
Filip Hrgović (CRO)	16
Ivan Dychko (KAZ)	20

==== Section 4 ====
First round
Petar Belberov (BUL)	14
Jasem Delavari (IRI)	18
Sardor Abdullaev (UZB)	20
Madian Kassem (EGY)	7

Second round
Tony Yoka (FRA)	13
Jasem Delavari (IRI)	11
Denizcan Gokkaya (TUR)
Erislandy Savón (CUB)	RSCI
Rok Urbanc (SVN)
Isaias Mena (COL)	RSC
Sardor Abdullaev (UZB)
Magomedrasul Majidov (AZE)	RSC

Third round
Tony Yoka (FRA)
Erislandy Savón (CUB)	KO
Isaias Mena (COL)
Magomedrasul Majidov (AZE)	RSCI

Quarterfinals
Erislandy Savón (CUB)
Magomedrasul Majidov (AZE)	RSCH
