= 2015 AIBA World Boxing Championships – Super heavyweight =

Boxing competitions

The super heavyweight competition at the 2015 AIBA World Boxing Championships was held from 7–15 October 2015. This is a qualifying tournament for the 2016 Summer Olympics. Tony Yoka of France defeated Ivan Dychko of Kazakhstan to win the world title.

== Medalists ==
| Gold | Tony Yoka (FRA) |
| Silver | Ivan Dychko (KAZ) |
| Bronze | Bakhodir Jalolov (UZB) |
| Bronze | Joseph Joyce (GBR) |

== Seeds ==
1. (Kazakhstan) Ivan Dychko
2. (Croatia) Filip Hrgović (quarterfinals)
3. (United Kingdom) Joseph Joyce (semifinals)
4. (Cuba) Lenier Pero(round of 16)

== Draw ==
=== Finals ===
Semifinals
1 | Ivan Dychko (KAZ) | 2
4 | Bakhodir Jalolov (UZB) | 1
3 | Joseph Joyce (GBR) | 0
2 | Tony Yoka (FRA) | 3

Final
Ivan Dychko (KAZ) | 0
Tony Yoka (FRA) | 3

==== Section 1 ====
Round of 32
Patrick Mailata (NZL) | 1
Rafael Lima (BRA) | 2
Joseph Goodall (AUS) | 0
Mikheil Bakhtidze (GEO) | 3
Bakhodir Jalolov (UZB) | 3
Mohamed Grimes (ALG) | 0

Round of 16
Ivan Dychko (KAZ) | 3
Rafael Lima (BRA) | 0
Edgar Alberto Ramirez (MEX) | 0
Florian Schulz (GER) | 3
Hussein Ishaish (JOR) | 3
Mikheil Bakhtidze (GEO) | 0
Bakhodir Jalolov (UZB) | 2
Lenier Pero (CUB) | 1

Quarterfinals
Ivan Dychko (KAZ) | 3
Florian Schulz (GER) | 0
Hussein Ishaish (JOR) | 0
Bakhodir Jalolov (UZB) | 3

Semifinals
Ivan Dychko (KAZ) | 2
Bakhodir Jalolov (UZB) | 1

==== Section 2 ====
Round of 32
Mohamed Arjaoui (MAR) | TKO
Edgar Muñoz (VEN)
Ali Demirezen (TUR) | 3
Mantas Valavicius (LTU) | 0
Petar Belberov (BUL) | 3
Nigel Paul (TTO) | 0

Round of 16
Joseph Joyce (GBR) | 3
Mohamed Arjaoui (MAR) | 0
Ali Demirezen (TUR) | 3
Satish Kumar (IND) | 0
Tony Yoka (FRA) | 3
Wang Zhibao (CHN) | 0
Petar Belberov (BUL) | 0
Filip Hrgović (CRO) | 3

Quarterfinals
Joseph Joyce (GBR) | 3
Ali Demirezen (TUR) | 0
Tony Yoka (FRA) | 2
Filip Hrgović (CRO) | 1

Semifinals
Joseph Joyce (GBR) | 0
Tony Yoka (FRA) | 3

== Results ==
=== Ranking ===
| Rank | Athlete |
|---|---|
| 1st place, gold medalist(s) | Tony Yoka (FRA) |
| 2nd place, silver medalist(s) | Ivan Dychko (KAZ) |
| 3rd place, bronze medalist(s) | Bakhodir Jalolov (UZB) |
| 3rd place, bronze medalist(s) | Joseph Joyce (GBR) |
| 5 | Florian Schulz (GER) |
| 5 | Hussein Ishaish (JOR) |
| 5 | Ali Demirezen (TUR) |
| 5 | Filip Hrgović (CRO) |
| 9 | Rafael Lima (BRA) |
| 9 | Edgar Alberto Ramirez (MEX) |
| 9 | Mikheil Bakhtidze (GEO) |
| 9 | Lenier Pero (CUB) |
| 9 | Mohamed Arjaoui (MAR) |
| 9 | Satish Kumar (IND) |
| 9 | Wang Zhibao (CHN) |
| 9 | Petar Belberov (BUL) |
| 17 | Patrick Mailata (NZL) |
| 17 | Joseph Goodall (AUS) |
| 17 | Mohamed Grimes (ALG) |
| 17 | Edgar Muñoz (VEN) |
| 17 | Mantas Valavicius (LTU) |
| 17 | Nigel Paul (TTO) |
