= 2013 AIBA World Boxing Championships – Super heavyweight =

Boxing competitions

The Super Heavyweight competition at the 2013 AIBA World Boxing Championships was held from 19–26 October 2013. Boxers were not limited to a maximum weight.

== Medalists ==
Gold	Magomedrasul Majidov (AZE)
Silver	Ivan Dychko (KAZ)
Bronze	Roberto Cammarelle (ITA)
Bronze	Erik Pfeifer (GER)

== Seeds ==
1. (Azerbaijan) Magomedrasul Majidov (champion)
2. (Kazakhstan) Ivan Dychko (final)
3. (England) Joe Joyce (first round)
4. (Italy) Roberto Cammarelle (semifinals)
5. (Croatia) Filip Hrgovic (quarterfinals)
6. (Germany) Erik Pfeifer (semifinals)

== Draw ==
=== Finals ===
Semifinals
1	(Azerbaijan) Magomedrasul Majidov	3
4	(Italy) Roberto Cammarelle	0
3	(Germany) Erik Pfeifer	0
2	(Kazakhstan) Ivan Dychko	3

Final
(Azerbaijan) Magomedrasul Majidov	KO
(Kazakhstan) Ivan Dychko

=== Top half ===
First Round
(United States) Lenroy Thompson	3
(Argentina) Facundo Ghiglione	0
(Turkey) Ali Demirezen	0
(Russia) Magomed Omarov	3
(Republic of Ireland) Cornelius Sheehan	0
(Cuba) Yohandi Ortega	3
(Croatia) Filip Hrgović	TKO
(China) Gu Guangming
(Uzbekistan) Mirzohidjon Abdullayev	3
(Australia) Johan Linde	0
(Sweden) Sallah Muhamed	3
(Scotland) Ross Henderson	0
(France) Tony Yoka	0
(Italy) Roberto Cammarelle	3

Second Round
(Azerbaijan) Magomedrasul Majidov	3
(United States) Lenroy Thompson	0
(Russia) Magomed Omarov	3
(Cuba) Yohandi Ortega	0
(Croatia) Filip Hrgović	3
(Uzbekistan) Mirzohidjon Abdullayev	0
(Sweden) Sallah Muhamed	0
(Italy) Roberto Cammarelle	3

Quarterfinals
(Azerbaijan) Magomedrasul Majidov	3
(Russia) Magomed Omarov	0
(Croatia) Filip Hrgović	0
(Italy) Roberto Cammarelle	3

Semifinals
(Azerbaijan) Magomedrasul Majidov	3
(Italy) Roberto Cammarelle	0

=== Bottom half ===
First Round
(England) Joe Joyce
(Algeria) Hamza Beguerni	TKO
(Ukraine) Iegor Plevako	TKO
(Israel) Abdala Kadan
(Romania) Mihai Nistor	2
(Serbia) Milutin Stanković	1
(Moldova) Alexei Zavatin
(Germany) Erik Pfeifer	TKO
(India) Satish Kumar	3
(Tajikistan) Mirodzhidin Karimov	0
(Belarus) Yan Sudzilouski	2
(Georgia (country)) Mikheil Bakhtidze	1
(Montenegro) Alen Beganović
(Hungary) István Bernáth	TKO

Second Round
(Algeria) Hamza Beguerni	0
(Ukraine) Iegor Plevako	3
(Romania) Mihai Nistor	0
(Germany) Erik Pfeifer	3
(India) Satish Kumar	3
(Belarus) Yan Sudzilouski	0
(Hungary) István Bernáth	0
(Kazakhstan) Ivan Dychko	3

Quarterfinals
(Ukraine) Iegor Plevako	0
(Germany) Erik Pfeifer	3
(India) Satish Kumar
(Kazakhstan) Ivan Dychko	WO

Semifinals
(Germany) Erik Pfeifer	0
(Kazakhstan) Ivan Dychko	3
