= Mihai Nistor =

Romanian boxer (born 1990)

Personal information
- Born: 5 November 1990 (age 35) Erbiceni, Romania
- Height: 183 cm (6 ft 0 in)

Boxing career
- Weight class: Super-heavyweight
- Reach: 176 cm (69 in)
- Stance: Southpaw

Boxing record
- Total fights: 9
- Wins: 8
- Win by KO: 8
- Losses: 0
Medal record
Men's amateur boxing
Representing Romania
Romania National Amateur Boxing Championships
Bronze medal – third place	2009 Arad	Heavyweight
Gold medal – first place	2010 Bacău	Super-heavyweight
Gold medal – first place	2012 Reșița	Super-heavyweight
Gold medal – first place	2013 Reșița	Super-heavyweight
Gold medal – first place	2014 Piatra Neamț	Super-heavyweight
Gold medal – first place	2016 Brăila	Super-heavyweight
Gold medal – first place	2017 Bucharest	Super-heavyweight
Gold medal – first place	2018 Tomești	Super-heavyweight
World Combat Games
Silver medal – second place	2010 Beijing	Super-heavyweight
European Championships
Bronze medal – third place	2011 Ankara	Super-heavyweight
Bronze medal – third place	2015 Samokov	Super-heavyweight

Mihai Nistor (born 5 November 1990) is a Romanian professional boxer. As an amateur, he won a bronze medal at the 2011 and 2015 European Championships. He also represented Romania at the 2016 Olympics.

== Amateur career ==
Nistor is best known for stopping Anthony Joshua at the 39th European Amateur Boxing Championships in 2011. Nistor competed in the men's super heavyweight event at the 2016 Summer Olympics, where he was eliminated in the round of 16 by the Jordanian Hussein Ishaish. Nistor competed in the semi-professional World Series of Boxing 2013 to 2018, representing Astana Arlans, Italia Thunder, and Fighting Roosters. He had 157 fights as an amateur and finished with a record of 138–19. In 2019 Nistor started his professional career.

=== Highlights ===
2009 – Arena Cup (Pula, Croatia) 5th place – 91 kg

- 1/4: Lost to Marko Calic (Croatia) RSCI 2

(silver) 2010 – Sportaccord World Combat Games (Beijing, China) 2nd place – +91 kg

- 1/4: Defeated Andrew Jones (Wales) 7:1
- 1/2: Defeated Tomasz Duszak (Poland) 9:1
- Finals: Lost to Zhang Zhilei (China) AB 3

(silver) 2011 – Bocskai Memorial Tournament (Debrecen, Hungary) 2nd place – +91 kg

- 1/4: Defeated Hrvoje Kisicek (Croatia) RSC 1
- 1/2: Defeated Bence Bouquet (Hungary) AB 3
- Finals: Lost to Erislandy Savón (Cuba) AB 2

(bronze) 2011 – Zlatko Hrbic Memorial Tournament (Zagreb, Croatia) 3rd place – +91 kg

- 1/4: Defeated Stjepan Radić (Croatia) 9:4
- 1/2: Lost to Rok Urbanc (Slovenia) 7+:7

(silver) 2011 – Hakija Turajlic Memorial Tournament (Sarajevo, Bosnia and Herzegovina) 2nd place – +91 kg

- Finals: Lost to Primislav Dimovski (Macedonia) DQ 2

(bronze) 2011 – EUBC European Continental Championships (Ankara, Turkey) 3rd place – +91 kg

- 1/16: Defeated Muhammet Guner (Turkey) RSCI 1
- 1/8: Defeated Petar Belberov (Bulgaria) RSCI 2
- 1/4: Defeated Anthony Joshua (United Kingdom) RSCH 3
- 1/2: Lost to Roberto Cammarelle (Italy) AB 2

2011 – AIBA World Championships (Baku, Azerbaijan) participant – +91 kg

- 1/16: Defeated Bence Bouquet (Hungary) KO 1
- 1/8: Lost to Filip Hrgović (Croatia) 22:10

(bronze) 2012 – Chemistry Cup (Halle, Germany) 3rd place – +91 kg

- 1/4: Defeated Sardorbek Abdullayev (Uzbekistan) RSC 3
- 1/2: Lost to Sergey Kuzmin (Russia) 18:11

2012 – AIBA European Olympic Qualification Tournament (Trabzon, Turkey) 6th place – +91 kg

- 1/8: Defeated Otto Wallin (Sweden) KO 2
- 1/4: Lost to Tony Yoka (France) 13:9

(gold) 2013 – Golden Belt Tournament (Constanța, Romania) 1st place – +91 kg

- 1/2: Defeated Issa Ahmed Madian Kassem (Egypt) 3:0
- Finals: Defeated Jose Angel Larduet (Cuba) 3:0

(gold) 2013 – Independence Cup (Drochia, Moldova) 1st place – +91 kg

- Finals: Defeated Erik Pfeifer (Germany) PTS

2013 – EUBC European Continental Championships (Minsk, Belarus) 5th place – +91 kg

- 1/8: Defeated Aleksei Zavatin (Moldova) TKO 2
- 1/4: Lost to Magomedrasul Medzhidov (Azerbaijan) DQ 3

2013 – AIBA World Championships (Almaty, Kazakhstan) 11th place – +91 kg

- 1/16: Defeated Milutin Stanković (Serbia) 2:1
- 1/8: Lost to Erik Pfeifer (Germany) 3:0

(bronze) 2015 – EUBC European Confederation Boxing Championships (Samokov, Bulgaria) 3rd place – +91 kg

- 1/8: Defeated Aleksei Zavatin (Moldova) TKO 2
- 1/4: Defeated Igor Shevadzutskiy (Ukraine) 3:0
- 1/2: Lost to Filip Hrgović (Croatia) 2:1

=== World Series of Boxing ===
2012, Season 2012/2013 4th Round – +91 kg

- Lost to Tony Yoka (France) 2:1

2013, Season 2012/2013 9th Round – +91 kg

- Defeated Clemente Russo (Italy) 2:1

2013, Season 2012/2013 Finals – +91 kg

- Lost to Oleksandr Usyk (Ukraine) 3:0

2013, Season 2013/2014 1st Round – +91 kg

- Defeated Facundo Cesar Ghiglione (Argentina) 3:0

2014, Season 2013/2014 5th Round – +91 kg

- Defeated Paul Koon (United States) 3:0

2014, Season 2013/2014 9th Round – +91 kg

- Defeated Yegor Plevako (Ukraine) 3:0

2014, Season 2013/2014 Quarter-finals 2nd Leg – +91 kg

- Lost to Arslanbek Mahmudov (Azerbaijan) 3:0

== AIBA Pro Boxing ==
2014, Pre-Ranking Round 1 (Baku, Azerbaijan) – +91 kg

- Defeated Ali Kiyidin (Germany) 3:0

2014, Pre-Ranking Round 2 (Baku, Azerbaijan) – +91 kg

- Lost to Mohamed Arjaoui (Marocco) 3:0

2014, Ranking Match (Baku, Azerbaijan) – +91 kg

- Lost to Erik Pfeifer (Germany) 3:0

2015, Title Round (Baku, Azerbaijan) – +91 kg

- Defeated Tony Yoka (France) WO

2015, Cycle I Round 1 (Marrakech, Marocco) – +91 kg

- Defeated Magomed Omarov (Russia) 2:1

2015, Cycle I Round 2 (Marrakech, Marocco) – +91 kg

- Defeated Mohamed Arjaoui (Marocco) 2:1

=== National highlights ===
Romania

2009 National Cup 7th place – 91 kg

- 1/8: Defeated Alin Manea RSC 2
- 1/4: Lost to Adrian Zabava WO

(bronze) 2009 National Championships 3rd place – 91 kg

- 1/4: Defeated Adrian Ciobanu 5:1
- 1/2: Lost to Petrisor Gananau 14:4

(gold) 2010 National Championships 1st place – +91 kg

- 1/2: Defeated Artur David AB 1
- Finals: Defeated Petrisor Gananau AB 3

(gold) 2012 National Cup 1st place – +91 kg

- Finals: Defeated Petrisor Gananau PTS

(gold) 2012 National Championships 1st place – +91 kg

- 1/2: Defeated Adrian Motorga WO
- Finals: Defeated Adrian Marc WO

(gold) 2013 National Championships 1st place – +91 kg

- 1/4: Defeated Ionel Oșvat TKO
- 1/2: Defeated Ionuț Patriche WO
- Finals: Defeated Marian Preda KO

(gold) 2014 National Championships 1st place – +91 kg

- Finals: Defeated Tiberiu Porcoi TKO

(gold) 2015 National Cup 1st place – +91 kg

- 1/4: Defeated Andrei Crivat DQ 2
- 1/2: Defeated Ionel Osvat TKO 2
- Finals: Defeated Tiberiu Porcoi TKO 1

(gold) 2016 National Championships 1st place – +91 kg

- Finals: Defeated Lucian Atănăsoaie WO

(gold) 2017 National Championships 1st place – +91 kg

- 1/2: Defeated Mădălin Nicolae
- Finals: Defeated Adrian Poputea

(gold) 2018 National Championships 1st place – +91 kg

- Finals: Defeated Daniel Berciu AB 2

Moldova

(silver) 2010 Prime Ministry Team Tournament (Briceni, Moldova) 2nd place – +91 kg

- 1/2: Defeated Aleksei Zavatin RSC 3
- Finals: Lost to Mihail Muntean 7:1

== Professional boxing record ==
9 fights	8 wins	1 loss
By knockout	8	0
By decision	0	1

No.	Result	Record	Opponent	Type	Round, time	Date	Location	Notes
9	Loss	8–1	Kashaun Davis	UD	8	26 Jul 2026	The Theater at Madison Square Garden, New York City, New York, US	
8	Win	8–0	David Zegarra	TKO	2 (6), 2:00	27 Apr 2024	Timisoara, Romania	
7	Win	7–0	Jhan Carlo Delgado	RTD	3 (10), 3:00	2 Sep 2023	Brentwood Centre, Brentwood, England	
6	Win	6–0	Geriso Aduashvili	KO	1 (6), 1:37	5 May 2023	Sports Hall, Mioveni, Romania	
5	Win	5–0	Raul Antonio Villarruel	TKO	2 (6)	25 Mar 2023	Casino Buenos Aires, Buenos Aires, Argentina	
4	Win	4–0	Fernando Rodrigo Simoes de Almeida	TKO	1 (8), 1:30	28 Oct 2022	Horia Demian Sports Hall, Cluj-Napoca, Romania	
3	Win	3–0	Colby Madison	KO	2 (8), 2:16	9 Jul 2021	BMO Stadium, Los Angeles, California, US	
2	Win	2–0	Jaime Solorio	KO	1 (8), 2:24	23 Jan 2020	The Hangar, Costa Mesa, California, US	
1	Win	1–0	Christian Mariscal	KO	3 (6), 2:00	5 Dec 2019	The Hangar, Costa Mesa, California, US	
