= Boxing at the 2015 European Games – Men's +91 kg =

Boxing competitions

Men's super heavyweight boxing at the 2015 European Games
- Venue: Baku Crystal Hall
- Date: 18–26 June
- Competitors: 19 from 19 nations

Medalists
gold medal	Joe Joyce	Great Britain
silver medal	Gasan Gimbatov	Russia
bronze medal	Tony Yoka	France
bronze medal	Mahammadrasul Majidov	Azerbaijan

The men's super heavyweight boxing +91 kg boxing event at the 2015 European Games in Baku was held from 18 to 26 June at the Baku Crystal Hall.

== Results ==
=== Final ===
Final; 26 June
Gasan Gimbatov (RUS)	0
Joe Joyce (GBR)	3

=== Top half ===
Round of 32; 18 June
Vladyslav Sirenko (UKR)	0
Mikheil Bakhtidze (GEO)	3

Round of 16; 19 June
Mahammadrasul Majidov (AZE)	3
Mikheil Bakhtidze (GEO)	0
Max Keller (GER)	0
Ali Eren Demirezen (TUR)	3
Yan Sudzilouski (BLR)	3
Daniel Táborský (CZE)	0
Marin Mindoljević (CRO)	1
Gasan Gimbatov (RUS)	2

Quarterfinals; 22 June
Mahammadrasul Majidov (AZE)	3
Ali Eren Demirezen (TUR)	0
Yan Sudzilouski (BLR)	0
Gasan Gimbatov (RUS)	3

Semifinals; 25 June
Mahammadrasul Majidov (AZE)
Gasan Gimbatov (RUS)	WO

=== Bottom half ===
Round of 32; 18 June
Petar Belberov (BUL)	0
István Bernáth (HUN)	3
Abdala Kadan (ISR)	0
Alexei Zavatin (MDA)	3

Round of 16; 19–20 June
Tony Yoka (FRA)	3
István Bernáth (HUN)	0
Dean Gardiner (IRL)	3
Guido Vianello (ITA)	0
Daniel Costea (ROU)	0
Mantas Valavičius (LTU)	3
Alexei Zavatin (MDA)
Joe Joyce (GBR)	KO

Quarterfinals; 22 June
Tony Yoka (FRA)	3
Dean Gardiner (IRL)	0
Mantas Valavičius (LTU)
Joe Joyce (GBR)	TKO

Semifinals; 25 June
Tony Yoka (FRA)	0
Joe Joyce (GBR)	3
