= Boxing at the 2016 Summer Olympics – Men's super heavyweight =

Boxing competitions

Men's super heavyweight boxing at the Games of the XXXI Olympiad
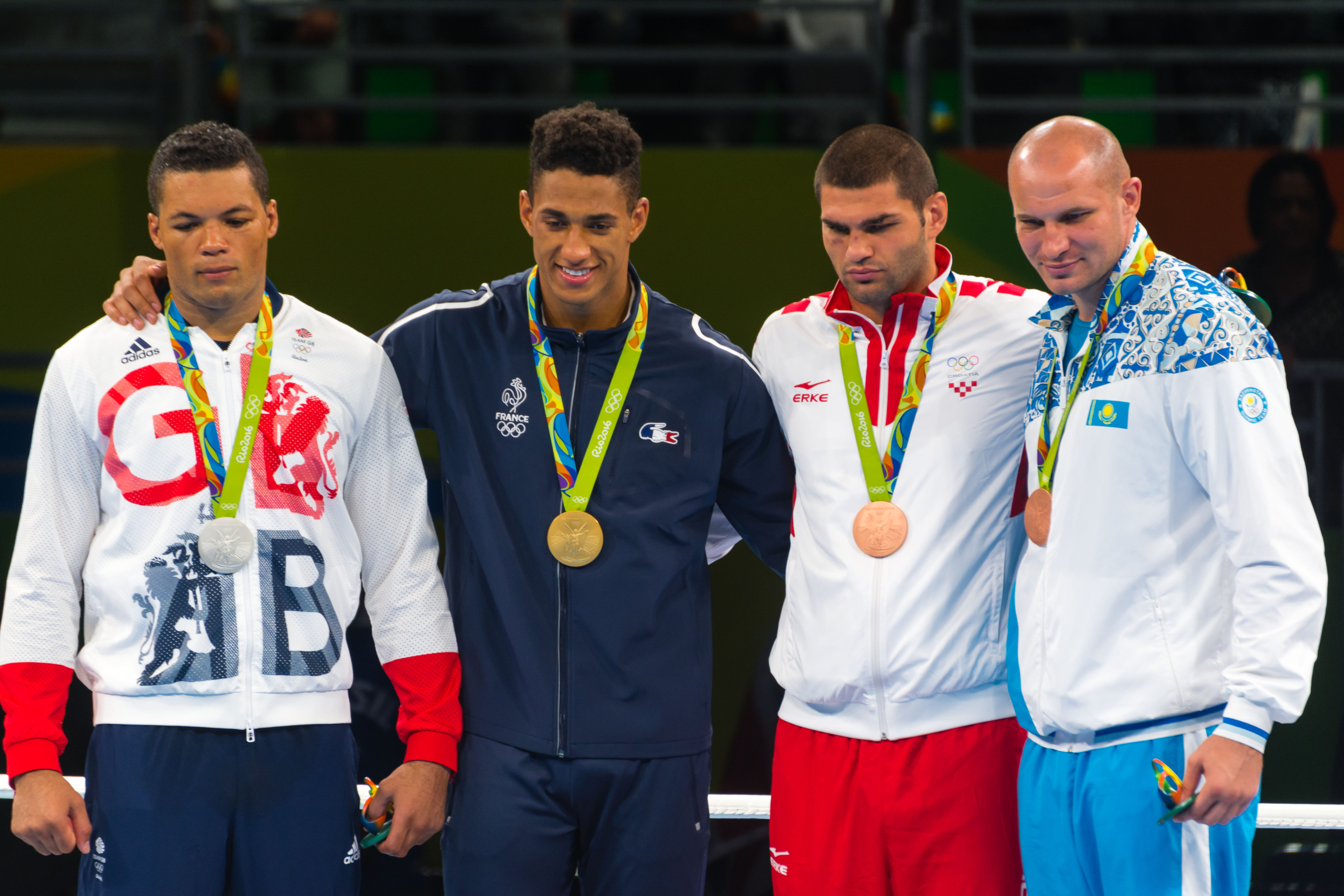
- Medalists
- Venue: Riocentro – Pavilion 6
- Date: 9-21 August 2016
- Competitors: 18 from 18 nations

Medalists
1st place, gold medalist(s)		Tony Yoka	France
2nd place, silver medalist(s)		Joe Joyce	Great Britain
3rd place, bronze medalist(s)		Filip Hrgović	Croatia
3rd place, bronze medalist(s)		Ivan Dychko	Kazakhstan

The men's super heavyweight boxing competition at the 2016 Olympic Games in Rio de Janeiro was held from 9 to 21 August at the Riocentro.

Tony Yoka won the gold medal, beating Joe Joyce in the final.

The medals for the competition were presented by Irena Szewińska, Poland, IOC member, and the gifts were presented by Kelani Bayor, Vice President of the AIBA.

== Schedule ==
All times are Brasília Time (UTC−3).

Date	Time	Round
Tuesday, 9 August 2016	13:12	Round of 32
Saturday, 13 August 2016	13:12	Round of 16
Tuesday, 16 August 2016	13:02	Quarter-finals
Friday, 19 August 2016	15:00	Semi-finals
Sunday, 21 August 2016	15:15	Final

== Results ==
=== Finals ===
Semi-finals
Tony Yoka (FRA)	2
Filip Hrgović (CRO)	1
Joe Joyce (GBR)	3
Ivan Dychko (KAZ)	0

Final
Tony Yoka (FRA)	2
Joe Joyce (GBR)	1

=== Top half ===
Round of 32
Clayton Laurent (ISV)	2
Erik Pfeifer (GER)	1

Round of 16
Tony Yoka (FRA)	3
Clayton Laurent (ISV)	0
Hussein Ishaish (JOR)	2
Mihai Nistor (ROU)	1
Lenier Pero (CUB)	3
Guido Vianello (ITA)	0
Ali Eren Demirezen (TUR)	0
Filip Hrgović (CRO)	3

Quarter-finals
Tony Yoka (FRA)	3
Hussein Ishaish (JOR)	0
Lenier Pero (CUB)
Filip Hrgović (CRO)	TKO

Semi-finals
Tony Yoka (FRA)	2
Filip Hrgović (CRO)	1

=== Bottom half ===
Round of 32
Magomedrasul Majidov (AZE)	3
Mohamed Arjaoui (MAR)	0

Round of 16
Joe Joyce (GBR)	TKO
Davilson Morais (CPV)
Edgar Muñoz (VEN)
Bakhodir Jalolov (UZB)	KO
Efe Ajagba (NGR)	KO
Nigel Paul (TTO)
Magomedrasul Majidov (AZE)	0
Ivan Dychko (KAZ)	3

Quarter-finals
Joe Joyce (GBR)	3
Bakhodir Jalolov (UZB)	0
Efe Ajagba (NGR)	0
Ivan Dychko (KAZ)	3

Semi-finals
Joe Joyce (GBR)	3
Ivan Dychko (KAZ)	0
