= Ivan Dychko =

Kazakh boxer (born 1990)

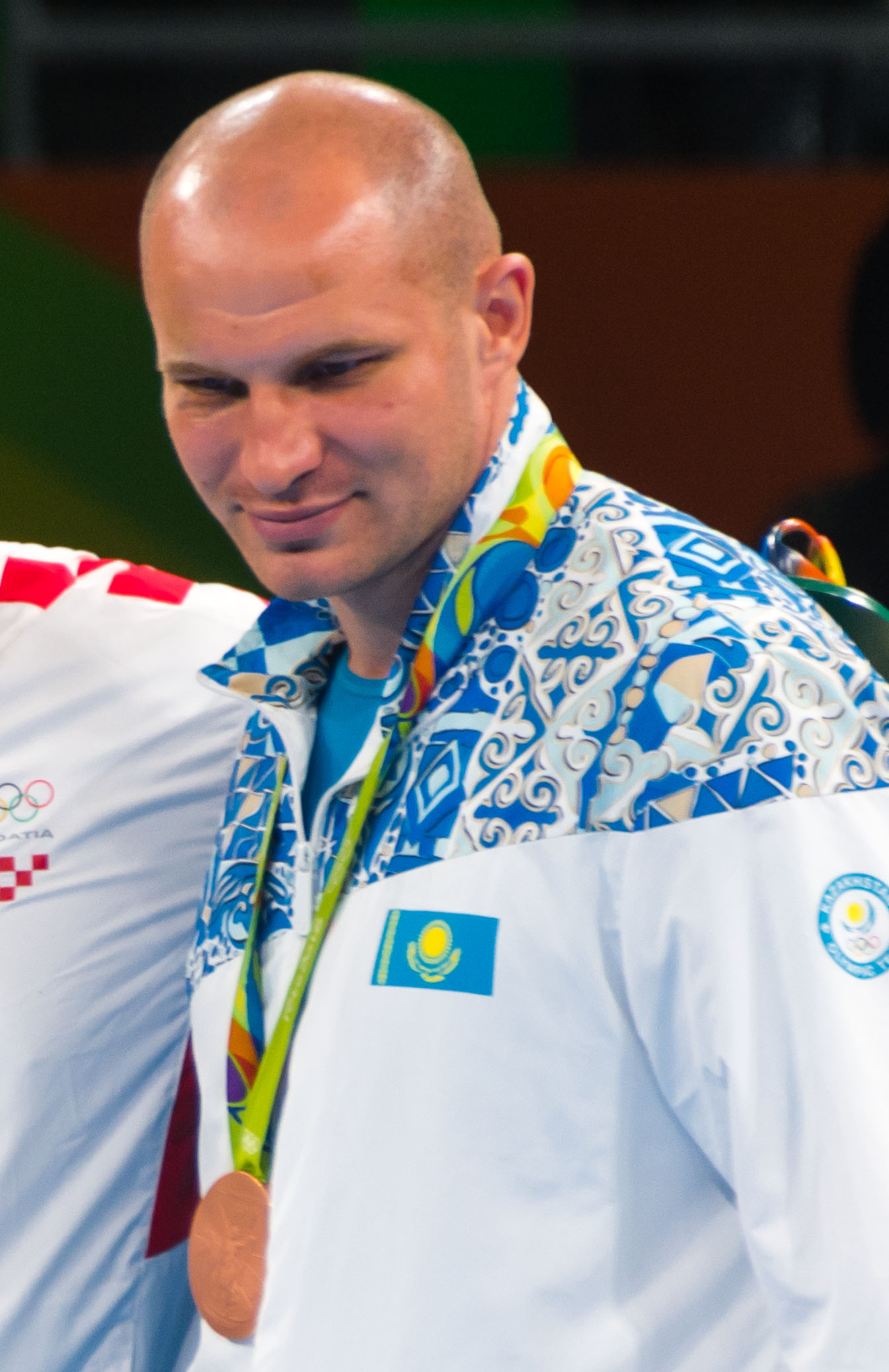
- Dychko at the 2016 Summer Olympics

Personal information
- Nationality: Kazakh
- Born: Ivan Fyodorovich Dychko; August 11, 1990 (age 36) Rudny, Kazakh SSR, USSR
- Height: 206 cm (6 ft 9 in)
- Weight: Heavyweight

Boxing career
- Reach: 206 cm (81 in)
- Stance: Southpaw

Boxing record
- Total fights: 16
- Wins: 15
- Win by KO: 14
- Losses: 1
Medal record
Men's amateur boxing
Representing Kazakhstan
Olympic Games
Bronze medal – third place	2012 London	Super-heavyweight
Bronze medal – third place	2016 Rio de Janeiro	Super-heavyweight
World Amateur Championships
Silver medal – second place	2013 Almaty	Super-heavyweight
Silver medal – second place	2015 Doha	Super-heavyweight
Bronze medal – third place	2011 Baku	Super-heavyweight
Asian Games
Gold medal – first place	2014 Incheon	Super-heavyweight
Silver medal – second place	2010 Guangzhou	Super-heavyweight
Asian Championships
Gold medal – first place	2013 Amman	Super-heavyweight
Gold medal – first place	2015 Bangkok	Super-heavyweight
AIBA Youth World Boxing Championships
Silver medal – second place	2008 Guadalajara	Heavyweight

Ivan Fyodorovich Dychko (Иван Фёдорович Дычко; born 11 August 1990) is a Kazakh professional boxer. As an amateur, he won bronze medals at the 2012 and 2016 Summer Olympics.

== Amateur career ==
At the 2008 AIBA Youth World Boxing Championships Dychko defeated American cruiserweight Contender Nick Kisner in the quarterfinals 5–1. Then went on to lose 8:10 to Erislandy Savón, in the final match to earn a silver medal. He moved up to super heavyweight a year later, winning his first of three national championships at the weight. At the 2009 World Amateur Boxing Championships, he was eliminated after losing his second bout 11:15 to Denis Sergeev. At the 2010 Asian Games, Dycho defeated Iranian Rouhollah Hosseini 6:4 in the semifinal but lost the final 5:7 to local favorite Zhang Zhilei. In 2011 he beat Roman Kapitanenko 9:4 at a local tournament. At the 2011 AIBA World Boxing Championships, he got past Zhilei 13:7 and Croat Filip Hrgovic but lost the semi-final to eventual winner Magomedrasul Majidov 9:16.

At the 2012 Olympics, he beat German boxer Erik Pfeifer 14–4 and Canadian boxer Simon Kean to win the bronze medal. He lost the semifinal to future world champion Anthony Joshua 13–11.

At the 2013 World Championships, Dychko beat Satish Kumar and Pfeifer to reach the final once again, where he was to rematch Majidov. Majidov got a convincing win by knocking Dychko out in the final round despite the latter winning the first 2 rounds. Dychko was first knocked down by an overhand. He'd get up but after the referee resumed the fight, Majidov landed the same shot and knocked down Dychko once again. At that point, the referee stopped the fight. Dychko bounced back by winning a gold medal at the 2014 Asian Games. Dychko would reach the final once again at the 2015 World Championships, but he lost to Tony Yoka 0:3.

At the 2016 Olympics, Dychko vanquished Majidov in the first round but would settle for a bronze once again, after losing to Joe Joyce in the semifinals. His amateur record is 181–18.

== Professional career ==
Dychko announced he was turning pro in February 2017. He said he was looking for a rematch against world champion Anthony Joshua. On his debut, Dychko, an abnormally tall boxer, was matched against 6'11 Aubur Wright, an even taller fighter. He was nevertheless able to convincingly beat Wright, stopping him after just 2 minutes in the first round.

== Professional boxing record ==
17 fights	16 wins	1 loss
By knockout	14	0
By decision	2	1

No.	Result	Record	Opponent	Type	Round, time	Date	Location	Notes
17	Win	16–1	Harvey Dykes	SD	10	6 Jun 2026	Bournemouth International Centre, Bournemouth, Dorset, England, U.K.	
16	Loss	15–1	Jermaine Franklin	UD	10	13 Sep 2025	Allegiant Stadium, Paradise, Nevada, U.S.	
15	Win	15–0	Samuel Crossed	KO	1 (8), 1:15	19 Jul 2024	Meadows Racetrack and Casino, Washington, Pennsylvania, U.S.	
14	Win	14–0	Craig Lewis	TKO	2 (8), 2:05	21 Aug 2024	ProBox TV Events Center, Plant City, Florida, U.S.	
13	Win	13–0	Ariel Esteban Bracamonte	TKO	2 (10), 1:13	10 Jun 2023	Casino Buenos Aires, Buenos Aires, Argentina	Won vacant WBA Fedecaribe heavyweight title
12	Win	12–0	Kevin Nicolas Espindola	UD	10	23 Jun 2022	Casino Buenos Aires, Buenos Aires, Argentina	
11	Win	11–0	Aleksandr Ustinov	TKO	1 (10), 2:40	18 Dec 2021	Astana, Kazakhstan	
10	Win	10–0	Denis Bakhtov	KO	1 (8), 1:00	10 Jul 2021	Baluan Sholak Sports Palace, Almaty, Kazakhstan	
9	Win	9–0	Nate Heaven	KO	2 (8), 2:33	12 Jul 2019	Seminole Hard Rock Hotel & Casino, Hollywood, Florida, U.S.	
8	Win	8–0	Ray Austin	TKO	3 (6), 1:48	10 May 2019	Seminole Hard Rock Hotel & Casino, Hollywood, Florida, U.S.	
7	Win	7–0	Maurice Harris	KO	1 (8), 1:39	6 Jul 2018	Seminole Hard Rock Hotel & Casino, Hollywood, Florida, U.S.	
6	Win	6–0	Mike Marrone	TKO	1 (8), 2:19	16 Jun 2018	Coliseum, St. Petersburg, Florida, U.S.	
5	Win	5–0	Stephen Kirnon	KO	1 (6), 0:38	23 Mar 2018	Seminole Hard Rock Hotel & Casino, Hollywood, Florida, U.S.	
4	Win	4–0	Celso Pinzon	TKO	3 (6), 1:37	16 Dec 2017	Miami Airport Convention Center, Miami, Florida, U.S.	
3	Win	3–0	Carlos Sandoval	TKO	1 (6), 2:28	8 Dec 2017	Hialeah Park Race Track, Hialeah, Florida, U.S.	
2	Win	2–0	Rodriguez Cade	KO	3 (4), 0:49	13 Oct 2017	A La Carte Event Pavilion, Tampa, Florida, U.S.	
1	Win	1–0	Aubur Wright	TKO	1 (4), 2:05	29 Sep 2017	Gilley's, Dallas, Texas, U.S.	
