= Boxing at the 2012 Summer Olympics – Men's super heavyweight =

Boxing competitions

Men's super heavyweight boxing at the Games of the XXX Olympiad
- Venue: ExCeL Exhibition Centre
- Date: 1–12 August 2012
- Competitors: 16 from 16 nations

Medalists
1st place, gold medalist(s)		Anthony Joshua	Great Britain
2nd place, silver medalist(s)		Roberto Cammarelle	Italy
3rd place, bronze medalist(s)		Magomedrasul Majidov	Azerbaijan
3rd place, bronze medalist(s)		Ivan Dychko	Kazakhstan

The men's super heavyweight boxing competition at the 2012 Olympic Games in London was held from 1 to 12 August at the ExCeL Exhibition Centre. Sixteen boxers from different countries competed.

== Competition format ==
The competition consisted of a single-elimination tournament. Bronze medals were awarded to both semifinal losers. Bouts were three rounds of three minutes each.

== Schedule ==
All times are British Summer Time (UTC+1)

Date	Time	Round
Wednesday 1 August 2012	15:30 & 22:30	Round of 16
Monday 6 August 2012	22:30	Quarter-finals
Friday 10 August 2012	22:30	Semi-finals
Sunday 12 August 2012	15:15	Final

== Results ==
Round of 16
Magomedrasul Majidov (AZE)	RSC
Meji Mwamba (COD)
Magomed Omarov (RUS)	19
Dominic Breazeale (USA)	8
Mohamed Arjaoui (MAR)	15
Blaise Yepmou Mendouo (CMR)	6
Ítalo Perea (ECU)	10
Roberto Cammarelle (ITA)	18
Ivan Dychko (KAZ)	14
Erik Pfeifer (GER)	4
Simon Kean (CAN)	16+
Tony Yoka (FRA)	16
Zhang Zhilei (CHN)	RSC
Johan Linde (AUS)
Erislandy Savón (CUB)	16
Anthony Joshua (GBR)	17

Quarter-finals
Magomedrasul Majidov (AZE)	17
Magomed Omarov (RUS)	14
Mohamed Arjaoui (MAR)	11
Roberto Cammarelle (ITA)	12
Ivan Dychko (KAZ)	20
Simon Kean (CAN)	6
Zhang Zhilei (CHN)	11
Anthony Joshua (GBR)	15

Semi-finals
Magomedrasul Majidov (AZE)	12
Roberto Cammarelle (ITA)	13
Ivan Dychko (KAZ)	11
Anthony Joshua (GBR)	13

Final
Roberto Cammarelle (ITA)	18
Anthony Joshua (GBR)	18+
