= Roberto Cammarelle =

Italian boxer (born 1980)

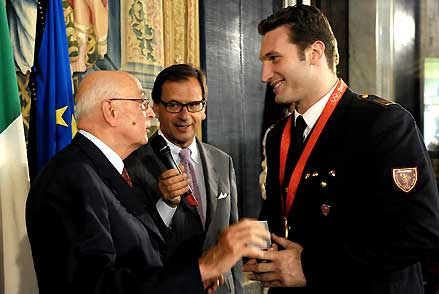
- Roberto Cammarelle with the President of the Italian Republic, Giorgio Napolitano

Personal information
- Full name: Roberto Cammarelle
- Nationality: (Italy) Italian
- Born: July 30, 1980 (age 45) Cinisello Balsamo, Italy
- Height: 1.90 m (6 ft 3 in)
- Weight: 103 kg (227 lb)

Sport
- Sport: Boxing
- Weight class: Super Heavyweight
- Club: Fiamme Oro
Medal record
Event	1st	2nd	3rd
Olympic Games	1	1	1
World Championships	2	0	2
European Championships	0	3	0
Mediterranean Games	3	0	0
Total	6	4	3
Olympic Games
Gold medal – first place	2008 Beijing	Super Heavyweight
Silver medal – second place	2012 London	Super Heavyweight
Bronze medal – third place	2004 Athens	Super Heavyweight
World Amateur Championships
Gold medal – first place	2007 Chicago	Super Heavyweight
Gold medal – first place	2009 Milan	Super Heavyweight
Bronze medal – third place	2005 Mianyang	Super Heavyweight
Bronze medal – third place	2013 Almaty	Super Heavyweight
European Amateur Championships
Silver medal – second place	2002 Perm	Super Heavyweight
Silver medal – second place	2004 Pula	Super Heavyweight
Silver medal – second place	2011 Ankara	Super Heavyweight
Mediterranean Games
Gold medal – first place	2005 Almeíra	Super Heavyweight
Gold medal – first place	2009 Pescara	Super Heavyweight
Gold medal – first place	2013 Mersin	Super Heavyweight

Roberto Cammarelle (born 30 July 1980) is an Italian amateur boxer, best known for winning the World Amateur Boxing Championships in 2007 (Chicago) and 2009 (Milan) as a super heavyweight and a gold medal at the 2008 Olympic Games in Beijing. He won a silver medal in 2012 London Olympic Games, losing to Anthony Joshua.

== Biography ==
Roberto Cammarelle was born in Cinisello Balsamo (Milan), from Lucanian parents, his father Angelo Cammarelle is from Rionero in Vulture and his mother Giovanna Caraffa from Filiano. He is a member of the Italian State Police.

== Amateur medals ==
He also won a Super Heavyweight bronze medal at the 2004 Summer Olympics and a silver medal at the 2004 European Amateur Boxing Championships in Pula, Croatia. The southpaw also won the bronze medal at the 2005 World Amateur Boxing Championships in Mianyang. He is 190 cm tall and weighs 103 kg.

=== Amateur highlights ===
- Italian Heavyweight Champion 2000/2001, Italian Super Heavyweight Champion 2002–2007
- 1998 competed as a Heavyweight at the Junior World Championships in Buenos Aires, Argentina
  - Lost to Steffen Kretschmann (Germany) PTS (4–12)
- 2002 2nd place at the European Championships in Perm, Russia as a Superheavyweight
  - Defeated Peter Yatsura (Slovakia) PTS
  - Defeated Gaga Bolkvadze (Georgia) PTS
  - Defeated Artyom Tsarikov (Ukraine) PTS
  - Lost to Alexander Povetkin (Russia) PTS
- 2002 2nd place at the Military World Championships in Curragh, Ireland
  - Lost to Sebastian Köber (Germany) PTS (7–16)
- 2004 2nd place at the European Championships in Pula, Croatia
  - Defeated Sebastian Köber (Germany) RSC
  - Defeated Csaba Kurtuzs (Hungary) RSCO
  - Defeated David Price (Great Britain) PTS
  - Defeated Sergey Rozhnov (Bulgaria) PTS
  - Lost to Alexander Povetkin (Russia) PTS
- 2004 won the Military World Championships in Fort Huachcua, United States
- 2004 3rd place at the Athens Olympics.
  - Defeated Gbenga Oloukun (Nigeria) PTS (29–13)
  - Defeated Alexey Mazikin (Ukraine) PTS (23–21)
  - Lost to Alexander Povetkin (Russia) PTS (18–31)
- 2005 3rd place at the World Championships in Mianyang, China
  - Defeated Ivica Bacurin (Croatia) RSCO
  - Defeated Aliaksandr Apanasionak (Belarus) RSCO
  - Defeated Michael Wilson (United States) RSCO-1
  - Lost to Roman Romanchuk (Russia) PTS (27–34)
- 2006 competed at the European Championships in Plovdiv, Bulgaria
  - Defeated Modo Sallah (Sweden) DSQ-3
  - Lost to Islam Timurziev (Russia) PTS (21–36)
- 2007 won the World Championships in Chicago, USA
  - Defeated Nelson Hysa (Albania) PTS (20–2)
  - Defeated José Payares (Venezuela) PTS (27–4)
  - Defeated Kubrat Pulev (Bulgaria) PTS (12–5)
  - Defeated David Price (Great Britain) walk-over
  - Defeated Islam Timurziev (Russia) walk-over
  - Defeated Vyacheslav Glazkov (Ukraine) PTS (24–14)
- 2008 Beijing Olympics
  - Defeated Marko Tomasović (Croatia) PTS (13–1)
  - Defeated Oscar Rivas (Colombia) PTS (9–5)
  - Defeated David Price (Great Britain) RSC-2
  - Defeated Zhang Zhilei (China) RSC-4
- 2009 won the World Championships in Milan, Italy
  - Defeated Roman Kapitonenko (Ukraine) PTS (10:5)
  - Defeated Viktar Zuyeu (Belarus) RET (1:0)
  - Defeated Kubrat Pulev (Bulgaria) PTS (12:6)
  - Defeated Rok Urbanc (Slovenia) PTS (14:0)
  - Defeated Michael Hunter (USA) PTS (8:1)
- 2010 competed at the European Championships in Moscow, Russia
  - Defeated Marcin Rekowski (Poland) 12–2
  - Lost to Sergey Kuzmin (Russia) PTS (3–6)
- 2011 2nd place at the European Championships in Ankara, Turkey
  - Defeated Viktor Zuyev (Belarus) RSCH 2
  - Defeated Tony Yoka (France) 22–9
  - Defeated Istvan Bernath (Hungary) 18–6
  - Defeated Mihai Nistor (Romania) RET 2
  - Lost to Magomed Omarov (Russia) 14–20
- 2011 Competed at the World Championships in Baku, Azerbaijan
  - Defeated Jose Payares (Venezuela) 17–8
  - Defeated Con Sheehan (Ireland) RET 3
  - Lost to Anthony Joshua (Great Britain) 13–15
- 2012 London Olympics
  - Defeated Ytalo Perea Castillo (Ecuador)
  - Defeated Mohammed Arjaoui (Morocco)
  - Defeated Magomedrasul Medzhidov (Azerbaijan)
  - Lost to Anthony Joshua (Great Britain) (UK)
- 2013 3rd place at the World Championships in Almaty, Kazakhstan
  - Defeated Tony Yoka (France) 3–0
  - Defeated Modo Sallah (Sweden) 3–0
  - Defeated Filip Hrgovic (Croatia) 3–0
  - Lost to Magomedrasul Medzhidov (Azerbaijan) 0–3
