= Meji Mwamba =

Congolese boxer

Meji Mwamba is a Democratic Republic of the Congo boxer. At the 2012 Summer Olympics, he competed in the Men's super heavyweight, but was defeated in the first round by Magomedrasul Majidov of Azerbaijan.
