= Martin Bakole =

Congolese boxer (born 1993)

Personal information
- Nickname: Martin Makabu Bakole
- Nationality: Congolese
- Born: Martin Bakole Ilunga; 1 June 1993 (age 33) Kananga, Zaire (now Democratic Republic of the Congo)
- Height: 6 ft 6 in (198 cm)
- Weight: Heavyweight

Boxing career
- Reach: 82 in (208 cm)
- Stance: Orthodox

Boxing record
- Total fights: 24
- Wins: 21
- Win by KO: 16
- Losses: 2
- Draws: 1

Martin Bakole Ilunga (born 1 June 1993) is a Congolese professional boxer. He has challenged once for the WBO interim heavyweight title in 2025. He is the younger brother of former cruiserweight boxing world champion, Ilunga Makabu.

== Professional career ==
Bakole made his professional debut on 25 March 2014, scoring a second-round technical knockout (TKO) victory over Cecil Smith at the Emperors Palace in Kempton Park, Gauteng, South Africa.

After compiling a record of 9–0 (6 KO), he faced undefeated Ali Baghouz (10–0–1) on 11 November 2017 at the Royal Highland Centre in Edinburgh, with the vacant IBO Continental heavyweight title on the line. Bakole captured the vacant title via first-round knockout (KO). He successfully defended the title in his next fight with a first-round TKO against DL Jones (8–1–1) on 23 June 2018 at The SSE Hydro in Glasgow.

He next fought former Olympian and cruiserweight world title challenger Michael Hunter (14–1) for the vacant IBO Inter-Continental heavyweight title on 13 October 2018 at the York Hall, London. Bakole lost the fight via tenth-round TKO. The first few rounds were evenly contested with Bakole walking his American opponent down while Hunter remained on the back foot, utilising movement and picking his moments to throw combinations. From round four and onwards, Hunter began to make an impression with his ring movement and speedy combinations. Towards the end of the seventh, Bakole landed a powerful right hand that stunned Hunter, causing the former cruiserweight to hold in the clinch. Hunter, now looking fatigued and suffering a cut to the right eye, had his mouth piece knocked out in the eighth by a clean right hand. After injuring his right shoulder in the eighth, Bakole was reluctant to throw the right hand in the ninth, instead choosing to work behind the jab. The end came in the tenth and final round; with Hunter landing powerful shots with more frequency, a left hook sent Bakole stumbling – not for the first time during the round – towards the corner. After a barrage of unanswered punches, referee Phil Edwards waved off the fight with 41 seconds of the round remaining, handing Bakole the first defeat of his professional career.

Following his loss to Hunter, Bakole fought former heavyweight world title challenger Mariusz Wach (33–4) on 6 April 2019 at the Spodek Arena in Katowice, Poland, with the vacant Republic of Poland International heavyweight title up for grabs. Bakole won the fight via eighth-round TKO in a scheduled ten-round bout. The first-round saw Wach boxing in a defensive manner, staying at range behind the jab and looking to counter-punch. The next few rounds saw Bakole take the lead. Throwing heavy combination punches to the head of his Polish opponent. Towards the end of the fifth, Bakole landed several punches to his opponent's head, leaving Wach on unsteady legs as he walked back to his corner. Wach attempted to rally back in the sixth-round, having success as Bakole's pace slowed. Bakole came back in the seventh to repeat his performance of previous rounds, putting together combinations and landing punches to the head of Wach. The end came in the eighth when referee Robert Gortat waved off the fight after Wach was on the receiving end of a flurry of twelve unanswered punches.

Following a first-round TKO win over Ytalo Perea (11–4–2) in August, Bakole was scheduled to face Gabriel Enguema on 19 October 2019 at the Utilita Arena, Newcastle. Days before the fight, Enguema withdrew from the bout due to an injury. Former world title challenger Kevin Johnson (34–15–1) stepped in at short notice. In what was a one-sided affair, Bakole won by fifth-round TKO in a scheduled eight-round bout after referee Ron Kearney waved off the fight following Johnson being on the receiving end of several unanswered punches, handing the durable veteran boxer the third stoppage defeat of his career.

In the January 2024 ranking published by the World Boxing Association, Bakole was the world number one ranked heavyweight.

Bakole was scheduled to face Jared Anderson at BMO Stadium in Los Angeles on August 3, 2024. Bakole won the fight by TKO in the fifth round. Bakole won the WBO International and the vacant WBO-NABO heavyweight titles in his victory.

Bakole faced Joseph Parker in Riyadh, Saudi Arabia on February 22, 2025, taking the fight on just two days notice as a replacement for Daniel Dubois. He lost the fight by a second-round TKO.

== Personal life ==
In 2016, Bakole relocated to Greengairs, Scotland, where he is coached by Billy Nelson.

His first child, a son named Martin Jr, was born in 2020.

== Professional boxing record ==
24 fights	21 wins	2 losses
By knockout	16	2
By decision	5	0
Draws	1	

No.	Result	Record	Opponent	Type	Round, time	Date	Location	Notes
24	Draw	21–2–1	Efe Ajagba	MD	10	3 May 2025	Anb Arena, Riyadh, Saudi Arabia	
23	Loss	21–2	Joseph Parker	TKO	2 (12) 2:15	22 Feb 2025	Anb Arena Riyadh, Saudi Arabia	For WBO interim heavyweight title
22	Win	21–1	Jared Anderson	KO	5 (10) 2:07	3 Aug 2024	BMO Stadium, Los Angeles, California, U.S.	Won WBO International and vacant WBC-NABF heavyweight titles
21	Win	20–1	Carlos Takam	TKO	4 (10), 2:15	28 Oct 2023	Kingdom Arena, Riyadh, Saudi Arabia	
20	Win	19–1	Ihor Shevadzutskyi	TKO	3 (10), 0:45	22 Apr 2023	G2A Arena, Rzeszów, Poland	
19	Win	18–1	Tony Yoka	MD	10	14 May 2022	Accor Arena, Paris, France	
18	Win	17–1	Haruna Osumanu	KO	1 (10), 2:50	18 Sep 2021	Dubai Sports City, Dubai, UAE	
17	Win	16–1	Sergey Kuzmin	UD	10	12 Dec 2020	The SSE Arena, London, England	Won vacant WBC International heavyweight title
16	Win	15–1	Rodney Hernandez	TKO	2 (10), 2:50	2 Nov 2019	Manchester Arena, Manchester, England	
15	Win	14–1	Kevin Johnson	TKO	5 (8), 0:58	19 Oct 2019	Utilita Arena, Newcastle, England	
14	Win	13–1	Ytalo Perea	TKO	1 (8), 1:20	2 Aug 2019	Exhibition Centre Liverpool, Liverpool, England	
13	Win	12–1	Mariusz Wach	TKO	8 (10), 2:26	6 Apr 2019	Spodek, Katowice, Poland	Won vacant Republic of Poland International heavyweight title
12	Loss	11–1	Michael Hunter	TKO	10 (10), 2:19	13 Oct 2018	York Hall, London, England	For vacant IBO Inter-Continental heavyweight title
11	Win	11–0	DL Jones	TKO	1 (10), 1:02	23 Jun 2018	The SSE Hydro, Glasgow, Scotland	Retained IBO Continental heavyweight title
10	Win	10–0	Ali Baghouz	KO	1 (10), 2:23	11 Nov 2017	Royal Highland Centre, Edinburgh, Scotland	Won vacant IBO Continental heavyweight title
9	Win	9–0	Kamil Sokolowski	PTS	6	7 Oct 2017	York Hall, London, England	
8	Win	8–0	Dominic Akinlade	TKO	1 (6), 1:56	29 Jul 2017	Bowlers Exhibition Centre, Manchester, England	
7	Win	7–0	Tomas Mrazek	TKO	3 (6), 1:32	1 Oct 2016	Bellahouston Leisure Centre, Glasgow, Scotland	
6	Win	6–0	Lukasz Rusiewicz	PTS	4	12 Aug 2016	Village Hotel, Ashton-under-Lyne, England	
5	Win	5–0	Patrick Madzinga	TKO	1 (6)	12 Dec 2015	Olive Convention Centre, Durban, South Africa	
4	Win	4–0	Ferenc Zsalek	MD	4	5 Dec 2014	Centre Sportif Obercorn, Differdange, Luxembourg	
3	Win	3–0	Lukas Filka	KO	1 (4), 2:55	8 Nov 2014	Hall Omnisport de La Préalle, Herstal, Belgium	
2	Win	2–0	Chris Mbombo	TKO	2 (4)	23 Apr 2014	Emperors Palace, Kempton Park, South Africa	
1	Win	1–0	Cecil Smith	TKO	2 (4)	25 Mar 2014	Emperors Palace, Kempton Park, South Africa	
