= Florian Schulz =

German nature and wildlife photographer (born 1975)

- Born: December 21, 1975; Weingarten, Württemberg
- Occupation: Wildlife Photographer
- Website: Florian Schulz

Florian Schulz is a German nature and wildlife photographer.

== Photographic career ==
Florian Schulz is the youngest founding member of the International League of Conservation Photographers (ILCP) which empowers conservation-minded photographers to use their talents to help create an understanding for the natural world.

== Articles ==
Articles and images have been published by magazines including the BBC Wildlife Mag (Britain), Nature’s Best, Outdoor Photographer, PhotoMedia, National Parks Magazine, The Nature Conservancy, The New York Times (USA), and Natur & Kosmos (Ger), as well as in numerous international book publications like Transboundary Conservation and the Human Footprint (Mex).

== Bibliography ==
- Yellowstone to Yukon: Freedom to Roam (Braided River, 2005)
- To The Arctic (Braided River, 2007)
- Journey to the Arctic (Braided River, 2008)
- The Wild Edge: Freedom to Roam the Pacific Coast (Braided River, 2015)
