= Erik Pfeifer =

German boxer

Personal information
- Nationality: German
- Born: 22 January 1987 (age 39) Asbest, Russian SFSR, Soviet Union
- Height: 1.91 m (6 ft 3 in)
- Weight: Heavyweight

Boxing career
- Stance: Orthodox

Boxing record
- Total fights: 11
- Wins: 9
- Win by KO: 7
- Losses: 2
Medal record
Men's amateur boxing
Representing Germany
World Championships
| Bronze medal – third place | 2011 Baku | Super-heavyweight |
| Bronze medal – third place | 2013 Almaty | Super-heavyweight |
EU Championships
| Gold medal – first place | 2009 Odense | Super-heavyweight |

Erik Pfeifer (born 22 January 1987) is a German professional boxer who has held the WBO European heavyweight title since 2019. As an amateur he won bronze medals at the 2011 and 2013 World Championships and competed in the 2012 and 2016 Olympics.

== Amateur career ==
He won his first medal in 2005, as he won the bronze medal at the Junior European Championship, in 2009 he won the Europe Championship which is not to be confused with the European Amateur Boxing Championships. In 2011, he won another bronze medal, but this time at the World Championships at super-heavyweight. He lost the semi-final to Anthony Joshua as he suffered a broken nose in the first round and as a result, the fight was stopped.

At the 2012 Summer Olympics, he lost to eventual bronze medalist, Ivan Dychko, in the first round.

At the 2016 Summer Olympics in Rio de Janeiro, he was defeated in the first round of the super-heavyweight class by Clayton Laurent Jr. of the Virgin Islands.

== Professional boxing record ==
| 11 fights | 9 wins | 2 losses |
|---|---|---|
| By knockout | 7 | 2 |
| By decision | 2 | 0 |

| No. | Result | Record | Opponent | Type | Round, time | Date | Location | Notes |
|---|---|---|---|---|---|---|---|---|
| 8 | Loss | 7–1 | (United Kingdom) Nick Webb | TKO | 2 (10), 1:51 | 27 Mar 2021 | Europa Point Sports Complex, Gibraltar | For vacant IBO International heavyweight title |
| 7 | Win | 7–0 | (Bosnia and Herzegovina) Adnan Redzovic | RTD | 5 (10), 3:00 | 16 Nov 2019 | Halle Messe Arena, Halle, Germany | Won vacant WBO European heavyweight title |
| 6 | Win | 6–0 | (Colombia) Epifanio Mendoza | RTD | 2 (8), 3:00 | 6 Jul 2019 | CU Arena, Hamburg, Germany | |
| 5 | Win | 5–0 | (Ukraine) Kostiantyn Dovbyshchenko | MD | 6 | 13 Apr 2019 | Erdgas Arena, Halle, Germany | |
| 4 | Win | 4–0 | (Italy) Angelo Rizzo | KO | 1 (6), 2:23 | 2 Mar 2019 | Maritim Hotel, Magdeburg, Germany | |
| 3 | Win | 3–0 | (Georgia (country)) Tornike Puritchamiashvili | UD | 6 | 15 Dec 2018 | Sporthalle, Hamburg, Germany | |
| 2 | Win | 2–0 | (Georgia (country)) Irakli Gvenetadze | RTD | 2 (8), 3:00 | 17 Nov 2018 | EWS Arena, Göppingen, Germany | |
| 1 | Win | 1–0 | (Georgia (country)) Davit Gogishvili | KO | 2 (6), 0:27 | 15 Sep 2018 | ECB Boxgym, Hamburg, Germany | |
