= Magomedrasul Majidov =

Azerbaijani boxer (born 1986)

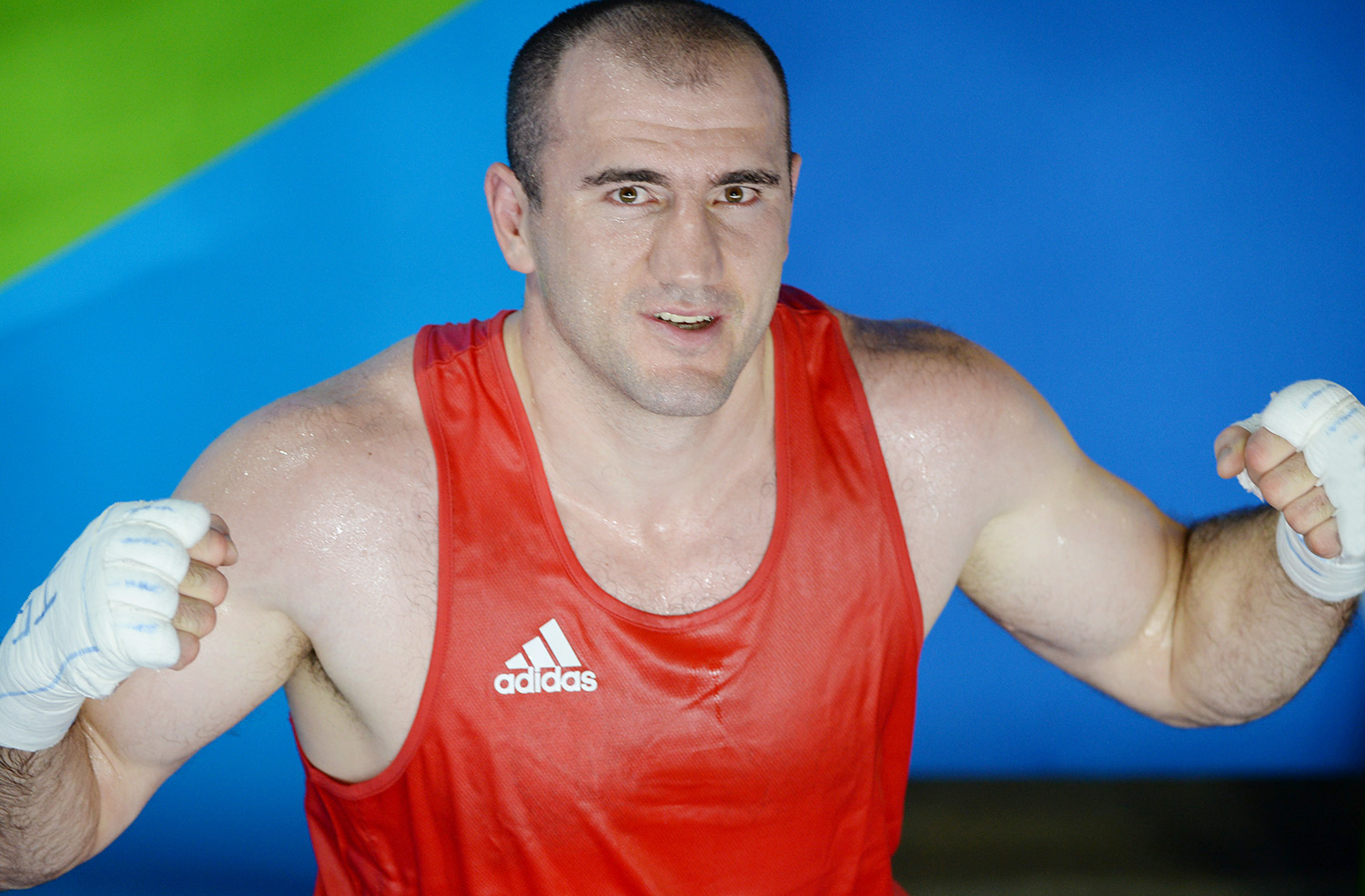

Personal information
- Nationality: Azerbaijani
- Born: Magomedrasul Medzhidov; 27 September 1986 (age 40) Akushinsky, Dagestan, Russia
- Height: 6 ft 3 in (191 cm)

Boxing career
- Weight class: Heavyweight

Boxing record
- Total fights: 4
- Wins: 3
- Win by KO: 3
- Losses: 1
Medal record
Olympic Games
Bronze medal – third place	2012 London	Super Heavyweight
World Amateur Championships
Gold medal – first place	2011 Baku	Super Heavyweight
Gold medal – first place	2013 Almaty	Super Heavyweight
Gold medal – first place	2017 Hamburg	Super Heavyweight
European Amateur Championships
Gold medal – first place	2013 Minsk	Super Heavyweight
European Games
Bronze medal – third place	Baku 2015	Super Heavyweight
Islamic Solidarity Games
Gold medal – first place	2017 Baku	Super Heavyweight

Mahommedrasul Majidov (Azerbaijani: Məhəmmədrəsul Məcidov, born 27 September 1986) is an Azerbaijani former professional boxer who competed from 2019 to 2021. As an amateur, he won a bronze medal at the 2012 Olympics and 2015 European Games; and gold at the 2011, 2013, 2017 World Championships and 2013 European Championships.

== Amateur career ==
At the 2011 World Amateur Boxing Championships the hard hitting Majidov stopped Uzbek Sardor Abdullayev in the round of 16 and Cuban favorite Erislandy Savón who he dropped heavily in the quarter-finals. In the semis he beat Kazakh Ivan Dychko 16:9. In the final he edged out Englishman Anthony Joshua 22:21.

At the 2012 Olympics, he stopped Meji Mwamba and European champion Magomed Omarov from Russia 17:14 and looked on his way to beat defending champion Roberto Cammarelle, he was leading 8:6 after the first round but the Italian fought back to win 13:12 and Majidov won bronze.

Majidov started the 2013 AIBA World Boxing Championships with two 3–0 wins over Lenroy Thompson of the United States in the second round, and Magomed Omarov of Russia in the quarter-finals. He continued on to beat Roberto Cammarelle in the semi-finals, with a knockdown gained for Majidov in the first round from a big right hand. Despite getting a warning point, he won the bout 3–0 and advanced to the final. In the final, Ivan Dychko of Kazakhstan started brighter, winning the first two rounds on all the judges' scorecards. However, near the beginning of the third round, a knockdown soon followed by another gave Majidov the victory by knockout, and the gold medal.

Magomedrasul started the 2017 AIBA World Boxing Championships with two 5–0 wins over Satish Kumar of the India in the first round, and Hussein Ishaish of Jordan in the second round. In the quarterfinals Majidov won 3–2 against Djamili-Dini Aboudou of France and in the semifinals he won against Joseph Goodall of Australia and advanced to the final. In the final, Magomedrasul Majidov fought Kamshybek Kunkabayev of Kazakhstan and won 4–1 winning the gold medal. With this victory, he became the world champion for the third time in super heavyweight.

== Professional career ==
In September 2019 it was announced Majidov had signed a promotional deal with Eddie Hearn's Matchroom Boxing USA and would make his professional debut on 13 September 2019, against Ed Fountain at Madison Square Garden in New York City. The fight was aired live on Sky Sports in the UK and DAZN in the US as part of the undercard for Devin Haney vs. Zaur Abdullaev. Majidov won the fight via a fourth-round technical knockout (TKO).

In April 2021, Majidov suffered the first defeat of his career in his fourth fight when he was stopped in the first round by Andrey Fedosov, who dropped Majidov twice despite fighting for the first time in 30 months. Majidov twisted his ankle after the first knockdown, and needed to be carried out of the ring on a stretcher with an ankle support boot on after the second knockdown.

== Professional boxing record ==
4 fights	3 wins	1 loss
By knockout	3	1

No.	Result	Record	Opponent	Type	Round, time	Date	Location	Notes
4	Loss	3–1	Andrey Fedosov	KO	1 (10), 1:24	17 Apr 2021	Seminole Hard Rock Hotel & Casino, Hollywood, Florida, US	
3	Win	3–0	Sahret Delgado	TKO	3 (8), 0:40	27 Nov 2020	Seminole Hard Rock Hotel & Casino, Hollywood, Florida, US	
2	Win	2–0	Tom Little	TKO	2 (8), 1:49	7 Dec 2019	Diriyah Arena, Diriyah, Saudi Arabia	
1	Win	1–0	Ed Fountain	TKO	4 (6), 2:41	13 Sep 2019	Madison Square Garden Theater, New York City, US	
