= Mikheil Bakhtidze =

Georgian boxer (born 1988)

Personal information
- Nationality: Georgian
- Born: 23 September 1988 (age 37) Tbilisi, Georgia
- Height: 192 cm (6 ft 4 in)

Boxing career
- Weight class: Super-heavyweight
- Stance: Orthodox

Boxing record
- Total fights: 6
- Wins: 6
- Win by KO: 4
- Losses: 0
Medal record
Men's amateur boxing
Representing Georgia
European Championships
Bronze medal – third place	2011 Ankara	Super-heavyweight

Mikheil Bakhtidze (born 23 September 1988) is a Georgian professional boxer. As an amateur, he won a bronze medal in the super-heavyweight division at the 2011 European Championships.

In 2021 Bakhtidze started his professional career.

== Amateur career ==
=== International highlights ===
(bronze) 2011 – EUBC European Continental Championships (Ankara, Turkey) 3rd place – +91 kg

- 1/8: Defeated Marcin Rekowski (Polish)
- 1/4: Defeated Rok Urbanc (Slovenia) PTS 3
- 1/2: Lost to Magomed Omarov (Russia) TKO 2

2012 – AIBA European Olympic Qualification Tournament (Trabzon, Turkey) 8th place – +91 kg

- 1/8: Lost to Vitalijus Subačius (Lithuania) TKO 1

== Professional boxing record ==
6 fights	6 wins	0 losses
By knockout	4	0
By decision	2	0

No.	Result	Record	Opponent	Type	Round, time	Date	Location	Notes
6	Win	6–0	(United States) Kaleb Slaughter	TKO	1 (6), 2:09	6 Nov 2021	(United States) American Legion Hall, Louisville, Kentucky	
5	Win	5–0	(United States) Curtis Harper	UD	6 (6)	19 Sep 2021	(United States) Revel, Atlanta, Georgia	
4	Win	4–0	(United States) Terrell Jamal Woods	UD	8 (8)	17 Jul 2021	(United States) Red Lion Conference Center, Cheyenne, Wyoming	
3	Win	3–0	(United States) Francois Russell	KO	2 (6), 1:37	1 May 2021	(United States) Red Lion Conference Center, Cheyenne, Wyoming	
2	Win	2–0	(United States) Jalyn Anthony	KO	1 (4), 1:44	6 Mar 2021	(United States) Kentucky Center for African-American Heritage, Louisville, Kentucky	
1	Win	1–0	(United States) Chris Beal	KO	1 (4), 2:59	4 Feb 2021	(United States) Revel club, Atlanta, Georgia	
