= Hussein Ishaish =

Jordanian boxer (born 1995)

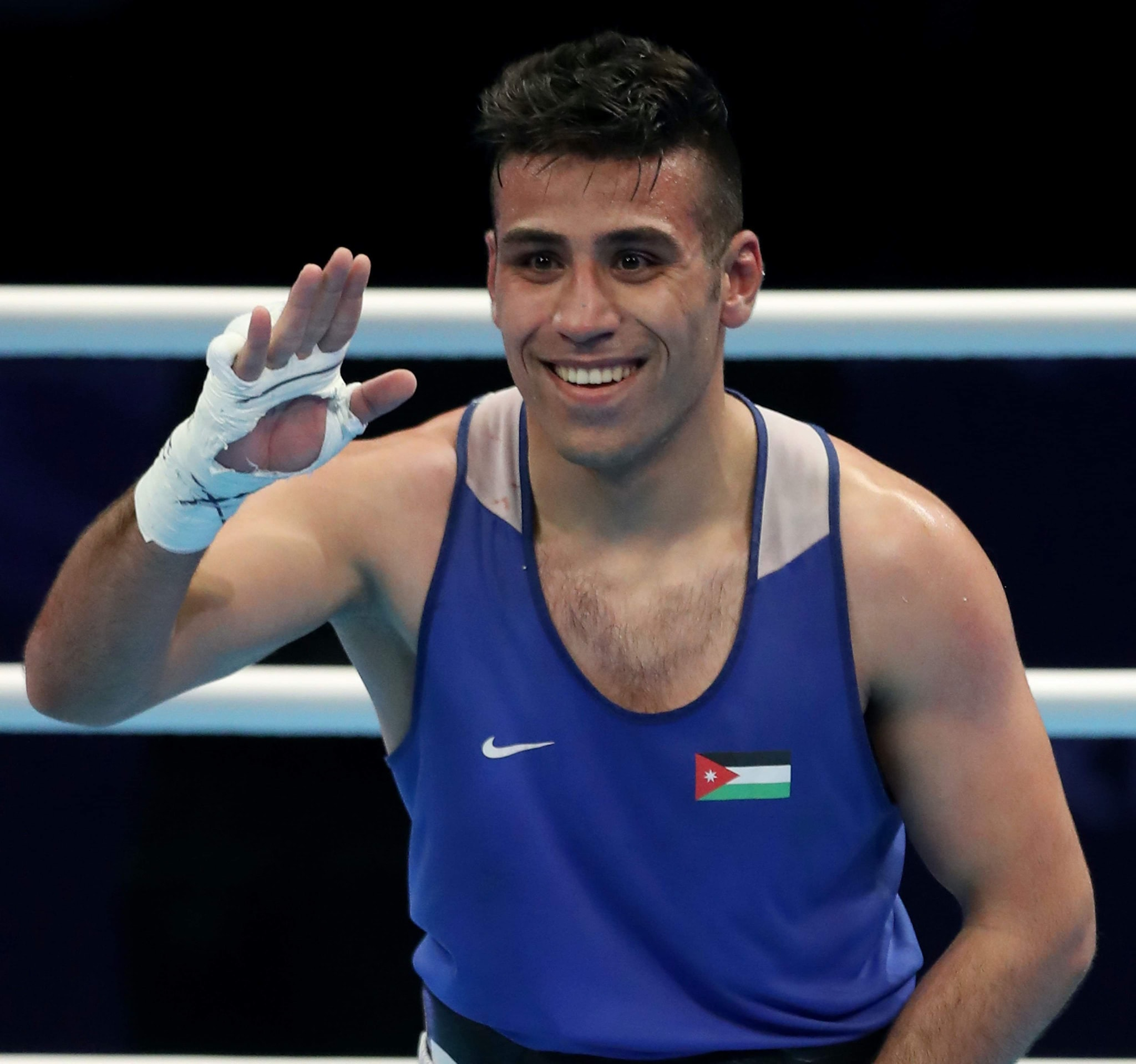
- Hussein Ishaish

Personal information
- Nationality: Jordanian
- Born: 6 August 1995 (age 31) Amman, Jordan
- Height: 180 cm (5 ft 11 in)

Boxing career
Medal record
Men's amateur boxing
Representing Jordan
Asian Championships
Gold medal – first place	2022 Amman	Light heavyweight
Bronze medal – third place	2015 Bangkok	Super heavyweight
Bronze medal – third place	2017 Tashkent	Super heavyweight
Bronze medal – third place	2019 Bangkok	Heavyweight
Islamic Solidarity Games
Bronze medal – third place	2025 Riyadh	80 kg

Hussein Iashaish (Arabic: حسين عشيش; born 6 August 1995) is a Jordanian boxer. He competed in the men's super heavyweight event at the 2016 Summer Olympics. He defeated Mihai Nistor of Romania in the round of 16. He was then defeated by eventual gold medalist Tony Yoka of France in the quarterfinals. Ishaish was the flagbearer for Jordan during the Parade of Nations.

His brother, Zeyad, is also a boxer.
