= Ali Eren Demirezen =

Turkish boxer (born 1990)

Personal information
- Nickname: The Iceman
- Nationality: Turkish
- Born: 2 April 1990 (age 36) Samsun, Turkey
- Height: 1.90 m (6 ft 3 in)

Boxing career
- Reach: 203 cm (80 in)
- Stance: Orthodox

Boxing record
- Total fights: 18
- Wins: 17
- Win by KO: 12
- Losses: 1
Medal record
Men's amateur boxing
Representing Turkey
Mediterranean Games
| Silver medal – second place | 2013 Mersin | Super-heavyweight |

Ali Eren Demirezen (born 2 April 1990) is a Turkish professional boxer who held the WBO European heavyweight title from 2018 to 2019. As an amateur he won a silver medal at the 2013 Mediterranean Games in Mersin, Turkey.

== Amateur career ==
At the 2013 AIBA World Boxing Championships in Almaty, Kazakhstan, he was eliminated already in the first round.

In 2015, he competed at the European Amateur Boxing Championships in Samokov, Bulgaria. He was eliminated in the quarterfinals, however, was qualified to participate at the AIBA World Boxing Championships the same year. He was defeated by Joe Joyce from England in the Section 2 quarterfinals of the 2015 AIBA World Boxing Championships in Doha, Qatar.

He earned a quota spot for 2016 Summer Olympics after taking a bronze medal at the 2016 European Boxing Olympic Qualification Tournament in Samsun, Turkey.

== Professional boxing record ==
| 18 fights | 17 wins | 1 loss |
|---|---|---|
| By knockout | 12 | 0 |
| By decision | 4 | 1 |
| By disqualification | 1 | 0 |

| No. | Result | Record | Opponent | Type | Round, time | Date | Location | Notes |
|---|---|---|---|---|---|---|---|---|
| 18 | Win | 17–1 | Adam Kownacki | UD | 10 | Jul 30, 2022 | Barclays Center, Brooklyn, New York, U.S. | |
| 17 | Win | 16–1 | Kevin Johnson | UD | 10 | May 28, 2022 | Die Bucht, Hamburg, Germany | |
| 16 | Win | 15–1 | Gerald Washington | TKO | 8 (10), 0:27 | Jan 1, 2022 | Seminole Hard Rock Hotel and Casino, Hollywood, Florida, U.S. | |
| 15 | Win | 14–1 | Nikola Milačić | TKO | 2 (10), 2:26 | Mar 13, 2021 | ECB Boxgym, Hamburg, Germany | Won vacant WBO European heavyweight title |
| 14 | Win | 13–1 | Kamil Sokolowski | UD | 6 | 20 Sep 2020 | Bartolomeo Best River Resort, Dnipro, Ukraine | |
| 13 | Win | 12–1 | Andrei Mazanik | UD | 8 | 18 Jan 2020 | Edel-optics.de Arena, Hamburg, Germany | |
| 12 | Loss | 11–1 | Efe Ajagba | UD | 10 | 20 Jul 2019 | MGM Grand Garden Arena, Paradise, Nevada, US | |
| 11 | Win | 11–0 | Adnan Redzovic | DQ | 6 (12), 1:15 | 6 Apr 2019 | Sluneta, Ústí nad Labem, Czech Republic | Retained WBO European heavyweight title |
| 10 | Win | 10–0 | Sergiej Werwejko | TKO | 8 (10), 1:50 | 29 Sep 2018 | Sporthalle, Hamburg, Germany | Retained WBO European heavyweight title |
| 9 | Win | 9–0 | Tornike Puritchamiashvili | RTD | 3 (8), 3:00 | 19 May 2018 | Spor Salonu, Trabzon, Turkey | |
| 8 | Win | 8–0 | Rad Rashid | TKO | 2 (10), 1:52 | 24 Mar 2018 | Inselparkhalle, Hamburg, Germany | Won vacant WBO European heavyweight title |
| 7 | Win | 7–0 | Michael Sprott | TKO | 5 (8), 2:59 | 23 Dec 2017 | Silence Hotel, Istanbul, Turkey | |
| 6 | Win | 6–0 | Jasmin Hasić | TKO | 2 (6), 1:11 | 15 Jul 2017 | EWS Arena, Goeppingen, Germany | |
| 5 | Win | 5–0 | Milos Dovedan | TKO | 1 (4), 2:00 | 19 May 2017 | Barclaycard Arena, Hamburg, Germany | |
| 4 | Win | 4–0 | Oleksandr Pavliuk | TKO | 2 (4), 0:19 | 18 Mar 2017 | Baltiska Hallen, Malmö, Sweden | |
| 3 | Win | 3–0 | Emre Altintas | RTD | 1 (4), 3:00 | 15 Feb 2017 | ECB Boxgym, Hamburg, Germany | |
| 2 | Win | 2–0 | Aleksandar Todorovic | TKO | 3 (6), 1:56 | 28 Oct 2016 | Zirkustelt, Hamburg, Germany | |
| 1 | Win | 1–0 | Patryk Kowoll | RTD | 1 (4), 3:00 | 15 Oct 2016 | G 18-Halle, Hamburg, Germany | |
