= Satish Kumar (boxer) =

Indian boxer (born 1989)

Satish Kumar Yadav
Personal information
- Nationality: Indian
- Born: 4 May 1989 (age 37) Bulandshahr, Uttar Pradesh, India
- Height: 1.88 m (6 ft 2 in) (2014)
- Weight: Super heavyweight (+91 kg)
- Military career
- Allegiance: India
- Branch: Indian Army
- Rank: Subedar Major
- Awards: Arjuna Award

Sport
- Sport: Boxing
Medal record
Men's amateur boxing
Representing India
Asian Games
Bronze medal – third place	2014 Incheon	Super heavyweight
Asian Championships
Bronze medal – third place	2015 Bangkok	Super heavyweight
Bronze medal – third place	2019 Bangkok	Super heavyweight
Commonwealth Games
Silver medal – second place	2018 Gold Coast	Super heavyweight

Subedar Major Satish Kumar (born 4 May 1989) is an Indian amateur boxer and a junior commissioned officer (JCO) of the Indian Army. He won the bronze medal at the 2014 Asian Games at Incheon in the super heavyweight category and silver at the 2018 Commonwealth Games. He is the first Indian boxer to qualify for the Olympics in the super heavyweight category.

== Early life ==
Born to a farmer in Bulandshahr who had four sons, Satish Kumar wanted to join the army like his elder brother did. He did so in 2008 as a Sepoy and moved to Ranikhet, where he was spotted for his height during a boxing camp and was urged to give the sport a try.

== Awards ==
He was awarded the Arjuna Award by the Government of India in 2018.
