= Magomed Omarov (boxer) =

Russian boxer

Personal information
- Full name: Magomed Shakhbanovich Omarov
- Nationality: Russia
- Born: 16 October 1989 (age 37) Kaspiysk, Dagestan ASSR, Russian SFSR, Soviet Union
- Height: 1.95 m (6 ft 5 in)
- Weight: +91 kg (201 lb)

Sport
- Sport: Boxing
- Weight class: Super Heavyweight
Medal record
European Amateur Championships
Gold medal – first place	2011 Ankara	Super Heavyweight
Summer Universiade
Gold medal – first place	2013 Kazan	Super Heavyweight

Magomed Shakhbanovich Omarov (Russian: Магомед Шахбанович Омаров, born 16 October 1989) is a Russian Super Heavyweight amateur boxer best known to win the 2011 European Amateur Boxing Championships. He also qualified for the 2012 Summer Olympics, held in London, where he reached the quarter-final but lost to Azeri World Champion Magomedrasul Majidov.

== Career ==
Southpaw Omarov, as 19-year-old, grasped the gold medal at 2011 European Amateur Boxing Championships, held in Ankara, Turkey, in June 2011 by upsetting 2008 Olympic Champion Roberto Cammarelle.

Omarov was sent to the Olympics instead of world class local rival Sergei Kuzmin. He qualified for the 2012 Summer Olympics at the European Qualifying Event, held in April 2012. In London he beat American Dominic Breazeale but ran into Azeri World Champion Magomedrasul Majidov and lost 14:17.

He won the title at the 2013 Summer Universiade. At the 2013 World Championships he beat two opponents but was again defeated by eventual champion Majidov.

== See also ==
- Boxing at the 2012 Summer Olympics
