= Con Sheehan =

Irish boxer

Cornelius Sheehan
Personal information
- Nickname: Con
- Born: 3 March 1989 (age 37) Clonmel, County Tipperary, Ireland
- Height: 6 ft 5 1/2 in (197 cm)
- Weight: Heavyweight

Boxing career
- Stance: Orthodox

Boxing record
- Total fights: 6
- Wins: 6
- Win by KO: 1
- Losses: 0
- Draws: 0
- No contests: 0
Medal record
Representing Ireland
European Union Amateur Championships
Silver medal – second place	2008 Cetniewo	Heavyweight
Gold medal – first place	2009 Odense	Heavyweight

Cornelius Sheehan is an Irish boxer from Clonmel, Ireland. As an amateur he became the youngest ever Irish Elite Heavyweight champion going on to win a total of a six Irish Elite titles, four at heavyweight and two at super heavyweight.He also represented the Leipzig Leopards in the World Series of Boxing and won a gold and a silver medal for Ireland in two consecutive years at the European Union Amateur Boxing Championships. Since turning professional he is undefeated in six contests.

== Amateur career ==
Sheehan boxed for Clonmel Boxing Club, where he was trained by Martin Fennessy. He debuted as a Senior boxer in the Heavyweight division before later moving to Super Heavyweight. His first Irish Elite title came in 2008 at Heavyweight with a points victory over Tommy Sheehan in the final. Sheehan would go on to six Irish Elite titles.

In the 2008 European Union Amateur Boxing Championships in Cetniewo, Poland, competed at Heavyweight earning victories over Stephen Simmons from Scotland (15:6) in the quarter-finals and Germany's Vahagn Sahakyan (10:7) in the semis. In the final he faced the favoured Greek boxer Helias Pavlidis, against whom he lost on points (12:29) earning a silver medal.

The following year European Union Championships took place in Odense, Denmark, and Sheehan competed again in the Heavyweight division. In the semi-finals he beat England's Warren Baister in the semi-finals and beat Spain's Juan Oliva Aleman (13:2) in the finals to earn a gold medal.

In his last national elite championships, Sheehan earned a points victories over Jason Barrons, Niall Kennedy and clubmate Dean Gardiner to clinch the 2014 Irish Super Heavyweight title.

== Professional career ==
In 2015, Sheehan moved to the USA to train under Virgil Hunter at King's Boxing Gym in Oakland, California. Sheehan made his professional debut on 19 January 2016 against Jonathan Rice in Club Nokia, Los Angeles, California, United States.

Sheehan went on to have a further five fights in the United Kingdom chalking up a record of 6-0. He has been inactive since 2017.

== Professional boxing record ==
6 Wins (1 Knockouts), 0 Losses, 0 Draw
Res.	Record	Opponent	Type	Rd., Time	Date	Location	Notes
Win	6–0	(Czech Republic) Tomas Mrazek	PTS	8	24 June 2017	(United Kingdom) Wythenshawe Forum, Manchester, England	
Win	5–0	(Hungary) Ferenc Zsalek	PTS	8	10 Mar 2017	(United Kingdom) Waterfront Hall, Belfast, Northern Ireland	
Win	4–0	(Poland) Kamil Sokolowski	PTS	8	5 Nov 2016	(United Kingdom) Titanic Exhibition Centre, Belfast, Northern Ireland	
Win	3–0	(Czech Republic) Radek Varak	TKO	1 (8), 1:32	1 Oct 2016	(United Kingdom) Old Trafford, Manchester, England	
Win	2–0	(Croatia) Igor Mihaljevic	PTS	4	24 Sep 2016	(United Kingdom) Tudor Grange Leisure Centre, Solihull, West Midlands, England	
Win	1–0	(United States) Jonathan Rice	UD	4	19 Jan 2016	Club Nokia, Los Angeles, California, United States	Professional debut.
