= Tony Yoka =

French boxer (born 1992)

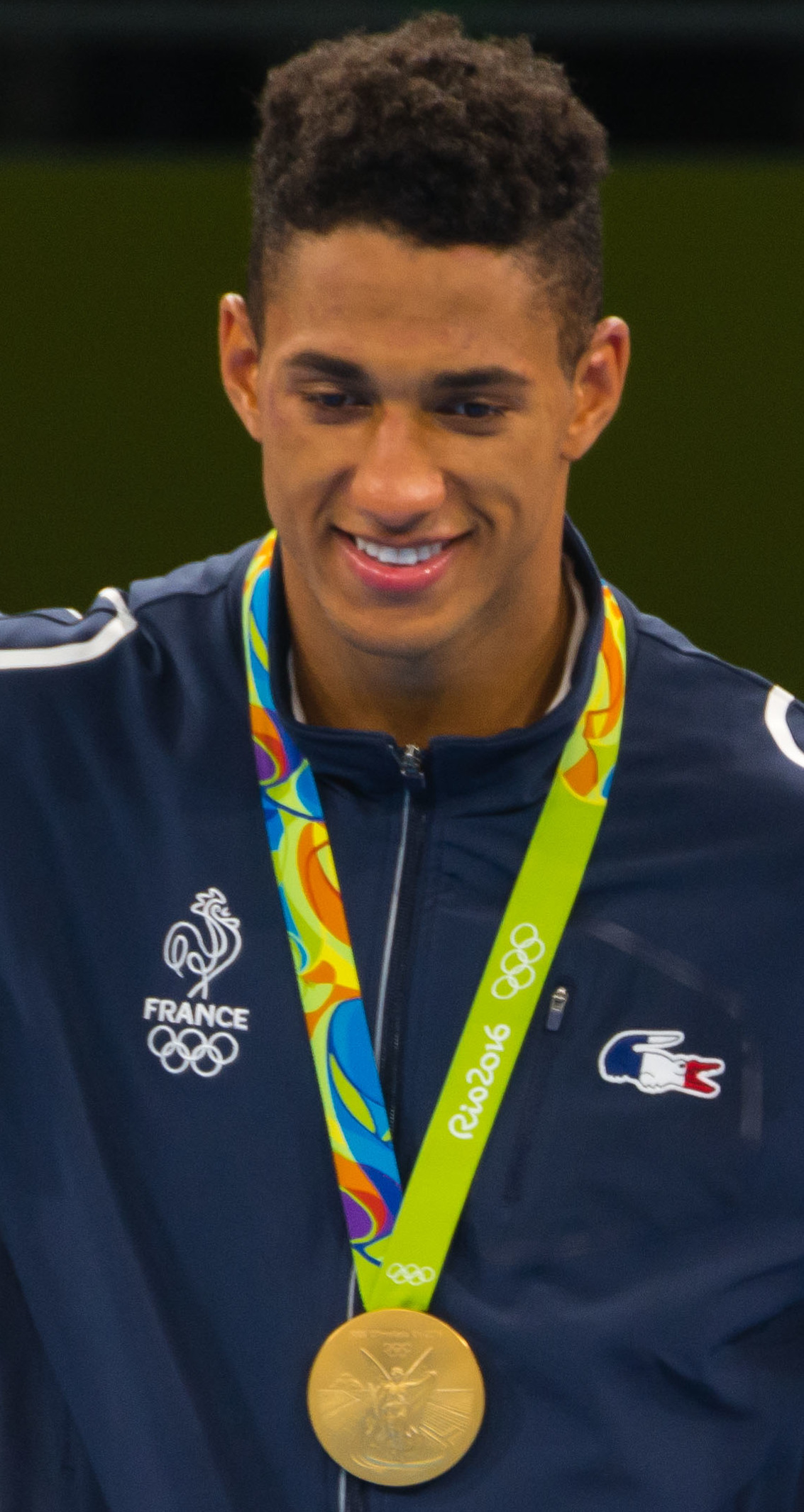
- Yoka at the 2016 Summer Olympics

Personal information
- Nationality: French
- Born: Anthony Victor James Yoka; 28 April 1992 (age 34) Paris, France
- Height: 2.01 m (6 ft 7 in)
- Weight: Heavyweight

Boxing career
- Reach: 208 cm (82 in)
- Stance: Orthodox

Boxing record
- Total fights: 19
- Wins: 16
- Win by KO: 12
- Losses: 3
Medal record
Men's amateur boxing
Representing France
Olympic Games
Gold medal – first place	2016 Rio de Janeiro	Super-heavyweight
World Championships
Gold medal – first place	2015 Doha	Super-heavyweight
European Games
Bronze medal – third place	2015 Baku	Super-heavyweight
EU Championships
Bronze medal – third place	2014 Sofia	Super-heavyweight
Youth Olympic Games
Gold medal – first place	2010 Singapore	Super-heavyweight
Youth World Championships
Silver medal – second place	2010 Baku	Super-heavyweight

Anthony Victor James Yoka (born 28 April 1992) is a French professional boxer. As an amateur, he won a bronze medal at the 2015 European Games; and gold at the 2015 World Championships and 2016 Olympics.

== Amateur career ==
Yoka won the gold medal against future WBO heavyweight champion Joseph Parker in the Super heavyweight division at the 2010 Summer Youth Olympics in Singapore. At the 2010 Youth World Amateur Boxing Championships, he lost the final to Croatia's Filip Hrgović. In 2011 he lost at the European (Senior) Championships to Olympic Champion Roberto Cammarelle. At the 2011 World Amateur Boxing Championships he outpointed Jasem Delavari from Iran but was knocked out by Cuban Erislandy Savón. At the 2012 European Boxing Olympic Qualification Tournament he beat three opponents before getting stopped by Magomed Omarov.

In 2015, Yoka first missed a chance to get the gold at the 2015 European Games but still managed to get the bronze medal. Following this achievement, Yoka won the gold at the 2015 AIBA World Boxing Championships, earning him a spot at the 2016 Olympic Games at Rio de Janeiro.

Yoka won the gold over the British boxer Joe Joyce in the super heavyweight division at the 2016 Olympic Games, earning France its first Super Heavyweight gold medal.

Before this fight, Yoka had beaten Hussein Ishaish in the quarter-final, and Filip Hrgović in the semi-final. His amateur record was 60 wins and 12 losses.

== Professional career ==
In 2017, Yoka turned professional. Trained by Virgil Hunter, Yoka fought and beat Travis Clark in his debut fight at Le Palais des Sports in Paris, in June 2017. In October 2017, Yoka defeated Jonathan Rice via unanimous decision 59–56, 60–54, and 58–56.

In July 2018, the French Anti-Doping Agency banned him for one year because of missing three drug tests between July 2016 and July 2017. His appeal against the ruling was rejected by the French Council of State in August 2018.

On 28 September 2019, Yoka faced Michael Wallisch. Yoka dropped Wallisch in the third round and Wallisch barely beat the count, which prompted the referee to wave the fight off and award Yoka the TKO victory.

In his next fight, Yoka faced former world title challenger and veteran countryman Johann Duhaupas. Yoka cruised past his experienced opponent, dropping him twice in the first round, the second time also being the final one from which Duhaupas would not get up.

On 27 November 2020, Yoka faced another veteran in Christian Hammer. Hammer caused Yoka some problems during the fight, but Yoka's win was never at risk, and went on to win the fight via unanimous decision, 100–89 on all three scorecards.

Yoka faced the former IBF International heavyweight titlist Joel Tambwe Djeko for the vacant European Union heavyweight title. The bout was scheduled for 5 March 2021, at the H Arena in Nantes, France. It was broadcast on ESPN+ in the US and Canal+ in France. He won the fight by a late twelfth-round technical knockout. A well place jab forced Djeko to turn his back and stop defending himself, which forced the referee to wave the fight off at the very last second.

Yoka was next set to face the undefeated Croatian heavyweight Petar Milas on 10 September 2021, at the Stade Roland Garros in Paris, France. Yoka was the bigger and more experienced boxer heading into the bout, and accordingly entered as a betting favorite. Yoka's fight was once again broadcast on ESPN+ in the US and Canal+ in France. Yoka won the fight by technical knockout, stopping Milas at the very last second of the seventh round.

Yoka was expected to face Carlos Takam on 15 January 2022, in a fight which was supposed to take place at the Accor Arena in Paris, France. However, shortly after the bout was scheduled, Takam withdrew due to injury. On 10 December 2021, it was announced that Martin Bakole would step in as Takam's replacement. The fight was postponed on 28 December 2021, due to measures imposed to combat the spread of COVID-19. Yoka instead chose to enter negotiations to face Filip Hrgović in an IBF title eliminator. The IBF later ruled Yoka ineligible to enter an agreement with any opponent other than Martin Bakole, as the two had already signed contracts to face each other. Yoka's fight with Bakole was rescheduled for 14 May 2022. He lost the fight by majority decision, after suffering two knockdowns, in the first and fifth rounds.

In his next fight, Yoka finally faced Carlos Takam at Accor Arena in Paris, on 11 March 2023, losing by split decision.

He lost his third successive contest when Ryad Merhy defeated him via split decision at Stade Roland Garros in Paris on 9 December 2023.

Yoka then won three low-key fights against Amine Boucetta, Lamah Griggs and Arslan Yallyev, before making it four victories in a row with a first round knockout success over Patrick Korte at Mobolaji Johnson Arena in Lagos, Nigeria, on 21 December 2025.

He was due to face Lawrence Okolie at Adidas Arena in Paris, on 25 April 2026, but the bout was cancelled when his opponent failed and anti-doping test.

Yoka was scheduled to challenge WBA (Regular) heavyweight champion Murat Gassiev at VTB Arena in Moscow, Russia, on 11 July 2026. Nine days before it was due to take place, the fight was cancelled after Yoka sustained a back injury.

After 11 months of inactivity, Yoka returned to the competitive boxing ring with a six-round points decision win over Kostiantyn Dovbyshchenko at AO Arena in Manchester, England, on 7 November 2026.

== Professional boxing record ==
19 fights	16 wins	3 losses
By knockout	12	0
By decision	4	3

No.	Result	Record	Opponent	Type	Round, time	Date	Location	Notes
19	Win	16–3	Kostiantyn Dovbyshchenko	PTS	6	7 Nov 2026	AO Arena, Manchester, England	
18	Win	15–3	Patrick Korte	KO	1 (10), 2:10	21 Dec 2025	Mobolaji Johnson Arena, Lagos, Nigeria	
17	Win	14–3	Arslan Yallyev	UD	10	17 May 2025	Adidas Arena, Paris, France	
16	Win	13–3	Lamah Griggs	TKO	2 (6), 1:21	7 Sep 2024	MECA Regent Circus, Swindon, England	
15	Win	12–3	Amine Boucetta	TKO	4 (8), 2:07	27 Jul 2024	Tolworth Recreation Centre, London, England	
14	Loss	11–3	Ryad Merhy	SD	10	9 Dec 2023	Stade Roland Garros, Paris, France	
13	Loss	11–2	Carlos Takam	SD	10	11 Mar 2023	Accor Arena, Paris, France	
12	Loss	11–1	Martin Bakole	MD	10	14 May 2022	Accor Arena, Paris, France	
11	Win	11–0	Petar Milas	TKO	7 (10), 2:59	10 Sep 2021	Stade Roland Garros, Paris, France	
10	Win	10–0	Joel Tambwe Djeko	TKO	12 (12), 2:59	5 Mar 2021	H Arena, Nantes, France	Won vacant European Union heavyweight title
9	Win	9–0	Christian Hammer	UD	10	27 Nov 2020	H Arena, Nantes, France	
8	Win	8–0	Johann Duhaupas	TKO	1 (12), 2:45	25 Sep 2020	La Défense Arena, Paris, France	
7	Win	7–0	Michael Wallisch	TKO	3 (10), 1:17	28 Sep 2019	Palais des Sports de Beaulieu, Nantes, France	
6	Win	6–0	Alexander Dimitrenko	TKO	3 (10), 1:27	13 Jul 2019	Azur Arena Antibes, Antibes, France	
5	Win	5–0	David Allen	TKO	10 (10), 0:43	23 Jun 2018	Palais des Sports, Paris, France	
4	Win	4–0	Cyril Léonet	TKO	5 (10), 2:21	7 Apr 2018	Palais des Sports, Paris, France	
3	Win	3–0	Ali Baghouz	TKO	2 (8), 1:04	16 Dec 2017	La Seine Musicale, Boulogne-Billancourt, France	
2	Win	2–0	Jonathan Rice	UD	6	14 Oct 2017	Zénith Paris, Paris, France	
1	Win	1–0	Travis Clark	KO	2 (6), 2:01	2 Jun 2017	Palais des Sports, Paris, France	

== See also ==
- Boxing at the 2010 Summer Youth Olympics
- Boxing at the 2016 Summer Olympics
- List of Youth Olympic Games gold medalists who won Olympic gold medals

Sporting positions
Amateur boxing titles
Previous: Anthony Joshua	Olympic super-heavyweight champion 2016	Next: Bakhodir Jalolov
Regional boxing titles
Vacant Title last held by Otto Wallin	European Union heavyweight champion 5 March 2021 – ? Vacated	Title discontinued
