= Filip Hrgović =

Croatian boxer (born 1992)

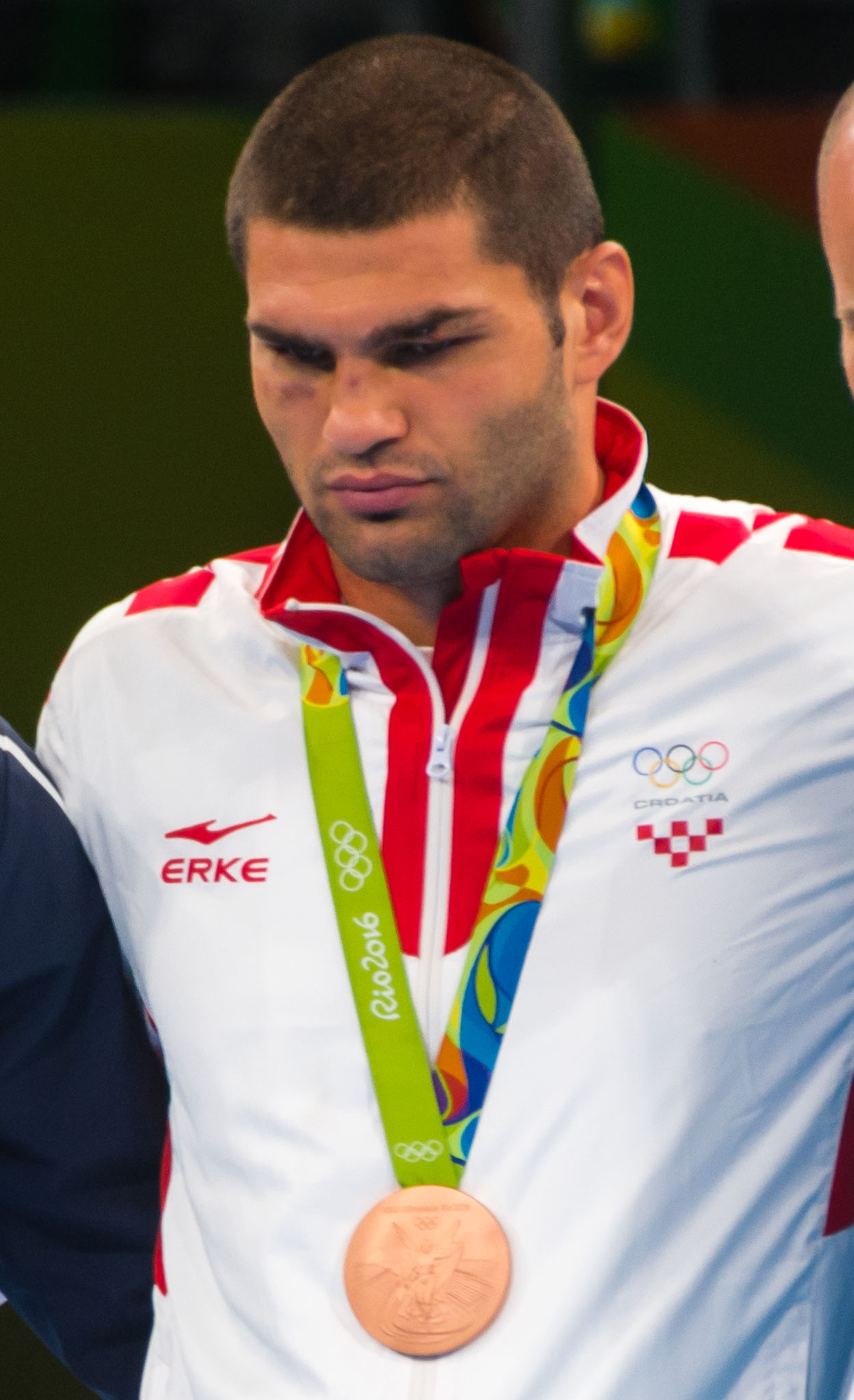
- Hrgović at the 2016 Summer Olympics
- Born: 4 June 1992 (age 34); Zagreb, Croatia
- Boxing career
- Nicknames: Hrga; El Animal; The Iron Chin; Stoneman
- Height: 6 ft 6 in (198 cm)
- Weight: Heavyweight
- Reach: 82 in (208 cm)
- Stance: Orthodox

Boxing record
- Total fights: 22
- Wins: 21
- Win by KO: 16
- Losses: 1
Medal record
Men's amateur boxing
Representing Croatia
Olympic Games
Bronze medal – third place	2016 Rio de Janeiro	Super-heavyweight
European Championships
Gold medal – first place	2015 Samokov	Super-heavyweight
AIBA Youth World Boxing Championships
Gold medal – first place	2010 Baku	Super-heavyweight

Filip Hrgović (born 4 June 1992) is a Croatian professional boxer. He has held the International Boxing Federation (IBF) heavyweight title since August 2026. As an amateur, he won the gold medal at the 2015 European Championships and a bronze at the 2016 Olympics.

== Early life ==
Filip was born on 4 June 1992 in Zagreb, Croatia, to Petar and Iva Hrgović. His father, who was born in Livno, Bosnia and Herzegovina, worked for Croatian Motorways, while his mother, a native of the Croatian capital Zagreb is a graduate in kinesiology and was focused on raising Filip and his four other siblings.

Hrgović recalls being overweight as a child, even earning the nickname "fatty" along the way. He would often end up in trouble and be reprimanded for it.

Hrgović's first sport was basketball at age eight, which he took up as a means to lose weight. He even managed to win the national championship with his club Dubrava but was forced to retire due to back and knee injuries. He then took up swimming, which would also last only a short period of time.

He started boxing at the age of thirteen in the boxing club Leonardo under the tutelage of coach Leonardo Pijetraj in his home district of Sesvete in Zagreb. His mother wasn't overly happy with Hrgović's decision to take up boxing as a profession, but his mind was already made up.

In 2015, Hrgović was awarded the Franjo Bučar State Award for Sport and the award for the best sportsman of Zagreb. In 2016, Hrgović was awarded the Order of Danica Hrvatska with face of Franjo Bučar.

== Amateur career ==
=== World championships ===
Hrgović participated in the 2010 AIBA Youth World Boxing Championships, held in Baku, Azerbaijan. He beat Jozsef Zsigmund in the first round, Fargan Omarov in the quarterfinals and Joseph Parker in the semifinals to earn a place in the tournament finals, where he faced Tony Yoka. It was the first of three future meetings in amateur competitions. He beat Yoka by points to win the gold medal. Hrgović earned a 10,000 kuna payout from the Croatian Boxing Federation for this victory.

In April 2012, Hrgović took part in the European Olympic Qualification tournament, competing in the super-heavyweight category. Despite scoring stoppage victories over Nikita Maculevics and Kaspar Vaha in the preliminary rounds, he would lose by decision to Magomed Omarov in the quarterfinals.

Hrgović took part in the 2013 AIBA World Boxing Championships as well. He beat Guangming Gu by stoppage and Mirzohidjon Abdullaev by decision in the preliminary rounds, to earn a place in the quarterfinals. He lost his quarterfinals bout to Roberto Cammarelle by decision.

Hrgović was the man credited for the cancellation of the David Haye vs Tyson Fury fight in 2013, after he cut Haye in a sparring session. He was also Kubrat Pulev's sparring partner for his fight against Wladimir Klitschko in 2014.

=== European championships ===
In May 2014, Hrgović fought in the Croatian National Boxing Championship. He won the gold medal by beating Pero Konsuo in the quarterfinal, Josip Granic in the semifinal and Ivan Andrasic in the finals. Hrgović likewise won the 2015 iteration of the tournament as well.

Hrgović qualified for the 2015 European Amateur Boxing Championships. Victories over Dean Gardiner, Mikheil Bakhtidze and Mihai Nistor earned Hrgović a place in the finals, where he was to fight Florian Schulz. It was the first time in eleven years that a Croatian boxer qualified for the finals of the European Amateur Boxing Championships. He won the tournament with a unanimous decision win against Schulz.

He was named March Boxer of the Month in 2015 by AIBA.

=== Olympic games ===
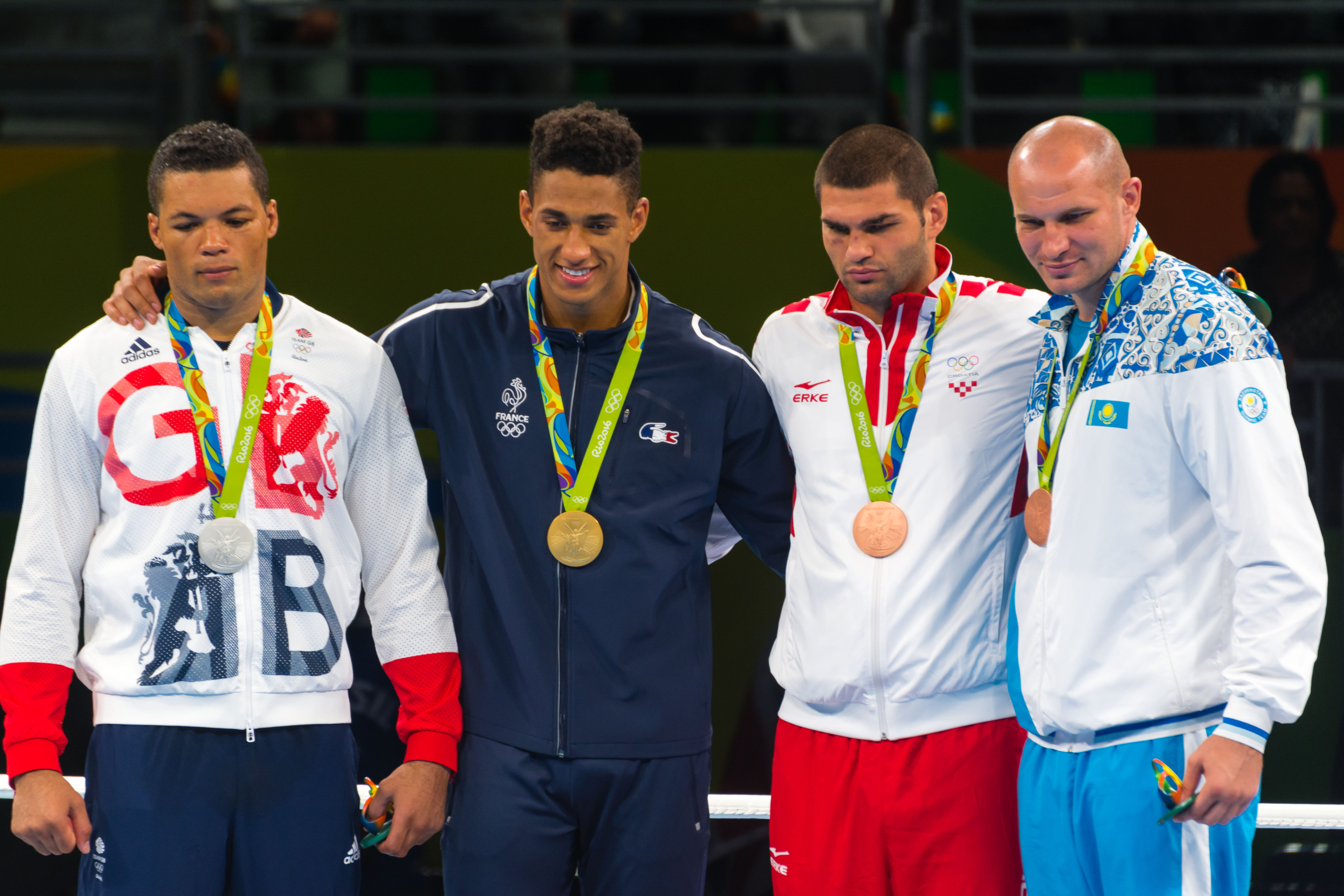
Filip Hrgović at the 2016 Olympic Games awards ceremony.

The last amateur competition Hrgović competed in was the 2016 Summer Olympics. After beating Ali Eren Demirezen by unanimous decision, Hrgović was scheduled to fight Lenier Peró in the quarterfinals. He beat Pero by TKO. He advanced to the semifinals, where he fought a rubber match with Tony Yoka. Yoka won the fight by a tight split decision, bringing Hrgović's overall score against him to 1–2 in amateur competitions. Despite this loss, Hrgović won a bronze medal.

After the Olympics, he was awarded the Order of Danica Hrvatska with face of Franjo Bučar by President of Croatia, Kolinda Grabar-Kitarović, for extraordinary sports success and winning a medal at the Olympics, and also for the promotion of sports and the reputation of the Croatia in the world.

== Professional career ==
=== Early career ===
On 30 September 2017, Hrgović started his professional career with a first-round stoppage victory over Raphael Zumbano of Brazil. Hrgović signed a deal with Sauerland Promotions following his debut.

For his second professional fight, Hrgović was scheduled to fight the former Czech Heavyweight boxing champion Pavel Sour. The fight was evenly contested for the majority of the first round, until Hrgović landed a flurry 30 seconds before the end, knocking out Sour with a right hook.

Hrgović was scheduled to fight the Tom Little, who was on a three-fight winning streak, on the undercard of the World Boxing Super Series semi-final clash between Oleksandr Usyk vs Mairis Briedis. Hrgović dominated throughout the fight, pressuring with a jab-right hand combination. He finally managed to knock Little down near the end of the fourth round, dropping his opponent with a right straight. Although Little managed to beat the ten-count, he had a cut over his left eye, and would quickly lose by technical knockout.

Hrgović was expected to face Sean Turner, at the time the #46 ranked heavyweight according to Boxrec, on the undercard of the WBSS semifinal bout contested by Callum Smith and Nieky Holzken. Hrgović remained dominant in all eight rounds, with two of the three judges scoring the fight 80–72 in his favor, and the third judge scoring it 79–73.

In his fifth professional fight, Hrgović was scheduled to fight the undefeated Mexican heavyweight Filiberto Tovar. It was the first time in Hrgović's career that he was scheduled to fight a ten-round bout. Hrgović once again dominated, stunning Tovar in first, second and third rounds, although he couldn't knock him down. Midway through the fourth round, Tovar's corner threw in the towel, awarding Hrgović a TKO victory.

Following his five straight victories, Hrgović was shortlisted for The Ring magazine Prospect of the Year award.

Hrgović was scheduled to fight Amir Mansour on 8 September 2018, for the WBC International heavyweight title. It was both the first time Hrgović fought in his native Zagreb, as well as the first time he was scheduled to fight in a twelve-round bout. In the first round, Hrgović utilized half-feints and jabs to pressure his opponent back, relying on his height and length to insulate him from Mansour's lunges. There was a brief break in action during the second round, after Mansour landed a blow to the back of Hrgović's head. After the break, the fight continued in the previous tempo, with Hrgović achieving a technical knockout win after knocking Mansour down twice in the third round.

Hrgović was expected to make the first defense of his secondary title against Ytalo Perea on 8 December 2018, at the Dražen Petrović Basketball Hall in Zagreb, Croatia. It was scheduled to be broadcast exclusively by RTL, domestically in Croatia. Perea was forced to withdraw two days prior to the bout due to travel visa issues, and was replaced by former world title challenger Kevin Johnson. Hrgović retained his title by unanimous decision, with all three judges awarding him all eight rounds of the fight. He dominated the bout from start to finish and came close to knocking Johnson down with an overhand right in the eight round, although he was unable to finish him. Hrgović was scheduled to make his second title defense against the 15–1 Gregory Corbin on 25 May 2019 at the MGM National Harbor in Oxon Hill. The bout was broadcast domestically in Croatia by RTL and internationally by DAZN. It was Hrgović's United States debut, as well as his DAZN debut. He won the fight by a first-round knockout, stopping Corbin after just 60 seconds, with his fourth strike of the bout.

Hrgović had his first fight in Mexico on 24 August 2019, against Mario Heredia, at the Centro de Usos Multiples in Hermosillo, Mexico. Heredia entered the fight off an upset with against Samuel Peter, but was seen as an easy fight for Hrgović, as he had lost five of his past six bouts. Although he started slowly, Hrgović maintained a steady stream of jabs, right straights and hooks throughout the first round. Heredia attempted to adjust by landing a number of body shots in the second round, which failed to stop the forward movement of Hrgović. The fight ended in the third round, as Heredia was knocked out with a right-left hook combination.

On 7 December 2019, on the undercard of Ruiz Jr. vs. Joshua II, Hrgović, then ranked #9 by the WBA and IBF, and #11 by the WBC, had what is perhaps his most notable win to date, a third-round knockout against Éric Molina. He dominated the fight from the first bell, dropping Molina twice; once in the first round and again in the second, before finally closing out with a third knockdown in the third round, from which Molina wasn't able to get up. Hrgović was expected to next face Ondřej Pála in the co-main event of the Dina Thorslund vs. Nina Radovanović title fight, held on 26 September 2020, at the Struer Energi Park in Struer, Denmark. Three days before the fight, Pála withdrew for an undisclosed reason, and was replaced on short notice by Alexandre Kartozia. Hrgović justified his role as the betting favorite, pressuring Kartozia throughout the fight, and knocking him out with a left-right combination at the 1:07 minute mark.

Two months after his victory over Kartozia, Hrgović was scheduled to fight Rydell Booker for the vacant IBF International Heavyweight title on 7 November 2020, at the Seminole Hard Rock Hotel & Casino, in Hollywood, Florida, in his return to the United States. Hrgović entered the bout as a –10000 betting favorite, while most odds-makers had Booker at +1400. He justified his role as the betting favorite, stopping Booker with a flurry of punches in the fifth round.

Following Hrgović's victory over Booker, Michael Hunter called for a fight between the two, claiming he had asked for the fight numerous times before. Although the fight didn't materialize at the time, IBF announced in February 2021 that the #5 ranked Hrgović and #4 ranked Hunter would fight to determine who would be the mandatory challenger for Anthony Joshua’s heavyweight title. The organization gave both fighters until 26 February 2021, to accept the bout. Both fighters accepted the fight, although the time and place of it weren't immediately revealed, as they were to be determined after a bidding took place on 6 April 2021. The bidding was later postponed. The purse bid was eventually won by Eddie Hearn’s Matchroom Boxing, who bid $606,666 for the fight, with a 60–40 split in favor of Hunter. Hunter withdrew from the bout following the purse bid.

As the Hunter fight failed to pan out, Hrgović was instead scheduled to defend his IBF International Heavyweight Title against the undefeated Marko Radonjic on 10 September 2021, at Wörthersee Stadion in Klagenfurt, Austria. Hrgović thoroughly dominated his opponent, knocking him down seven times before Radonjić retired from the bout after the third round. Hrgović made his second IBF International heavyweight title defense against Scott Alexander at the MGM Grand Las Vegas in Las Vegas, United States on 4 December 2021. The bout was set for the undercard of a DAZN card headlined by Devin Haney and Joseph Diaz. On November 30, five days before the fight, it was announced that Alexander had withdrawn from the fight and would be replaced by Emir Ahmatović. Hrgović won the fight by technical knockout, 30 seconds into the third round. Prior to the stoppage, he knocked Ahmetović down twice towards the end of the second round.

=== Rise up the ranks ===
==== Hrgović vs Zhang ====
On 3 January 2022, the IBF sent an invitation to Hrgović and Luis Ortiz to enter talks for a final title eliminator. Hrgović immediately accepted the offer, with his promoters stating: "Challenge accepted by Filip Hrgovic, [Three] days and counting for Luis Ortiz to accept". Ortiz refused, citing inability to compete due to injury. The IBF then invited the next highest ranked heavyweight contender, Joseph Parker, to enter talks for a title eliminator bout. Parker refused to enter talks as well, due to recovering from injuries. On January 10, the same invitation was extended to Tony Yoka. Yoka accepted the offer on January 13. The fight was supposed to be a rematch of their 2016 Summer Olympics semi-final bout, which Yoka narrowly won on points. The IBF later ruled Yoka ineligible to enter an agreement with any opponent other than Martin Bakole, as the two had already signed contracts to face each other. On January 26, both Andy Ruiz Jr. and Murat Gassiev received invitations to enter into negotiations with Hrgović, which they refused five days later, citing lingering injuries as the reason for refusal. On February 7, it was revealed that the #13 ranked Chinese heavyweight Zhilei Zhang had accepted the invitation to enter into negotiations with Hrgović.

A purse bid was called by the organization on February 14, as the two camps failed to come to terms. Matchroom and Wasserman won the purse bid a joint bid of $650,000. Hrgović was entitled to a 60% split ($390,000), while Zhang received a 40% split of the purse ($260,000). The bout was expected to take place on 7 May 2022, on the Canelo Álvarez vs. Dmitry Bivol undercard, as the co-feature to the main event. Hrgović withdrew from the bout on May 2, following the death of his father. The fight was rescheduled for the Oleksandr Usyk vs. Anthony Joshua II undercard. It took place at the King Abdullah Sports City in Jeddah, Saudi Arabia on 20 August 2022, as part of a DAZN pay-per-view.

Despite a poor start, Hrgović was able to win the fight by unanimous decision. Judges Leszek Jankowiak and Robin Taylor scored the bout 115–112 in his favor, while judge Pawel Kardyni awarded Hrgović a 114–113 scorecard. Hrgović was knocked down with a check right hook in the back of the head, which is formally prohibited, in the last thirty seconds of the opening round and appeared to struggle with Zhang's power in the early parts of the fight. As it went on however, the Chinese boxer grew more exhausted and the volume of Hrgović was enough to earn him the latter rounds. The fight result was slightly controversial, and there was some disagreement among the media outlets as to the scoring. For example, BadLeftHook scored the fight 115–112 for Zhang, while Boxingscene had it 114–113 Hrgović.

==== Hrgović vs McKean ====
On 13 November 2022, the IBF formally ordered their heavyweight champion Oleksandr Usyk to enter into negotiations with Hrgović, who was at the time the mandatory challenger for the title. Matchroom and Wasserman Boxing later confirmed that Hrgović opted to forgo the negotiation period and head straight to a purse bid. The IBF rescinded their order on 9 January 2023, as they recognized that the WBA was next in the “rotation” for a mandatory title defense, with the stipulation that the winner would face Hrgović within 180 days. Ten days later, it was revealed that the IBF had ordered an interim title fight between Hrgović and the former unified heavyweight champion Andy Ruiz Jr. As the two camps couldn't come to an agreement, the IBF called for a purse bid to be held on February 28, which was eventually moved up to February 23. Ruiz declined to move forward with the interim championship bout hours before the purse bid was supposed to be held. As the expected bout against Ruiz fell through, Hrgović was instead booked to face the undefeated Demsey McKean on 12 August 2023. The fight took place on the undercard of Anthony Joshua vs Robert Helenius, at The O2 Arena in London, England. Hrgović won the fight by a twelfth-round technical knockout. He was able to out-land McKean 173 to 116 in total punches and 148 to 90 in power punches. This victory earned Hrgović a reported €347,000 fight purse.

==== Hrgović vs De Mori ====
On 6 October 2023, the IBF confirmed they would strip the winner of the Tyson Fury vs Oleksandr Usyk heavyweight championship unification bout, should the winner not immediately make a mandatory title defense against Hrgović. Hrgović faced Mark de Mori in a stay-busy fight on the undercard of Anthony Joshua vs. Otto Wallin, on 23 December 2023 at the Kingdom Arena in Riyadh, Saudi Arabia. It was his first fight as a free agent, as his promotional agreement with Wasserman Boxing expired on November 2. On the night of the fight, Hrgović was able to knock de Mori down in the very first minute of the opening round. The referee stopped the fight at the 1:44 minute mark of the first round, after Hrgović knocked his opponent down for the second time.

==== Hrgović vs Dubois ====
During an appearance at the Ariel Helwani, Saudi adviser at the Royal Court under the rank of Minister Turki Al-Sheikh made a public offer to Hrgović to fight one of six possible opponents: Daniel Dubois, Martin Bakole, Frank Sanchez, Jarrell Miller, Agit Kabayel and Jared Anderson. On 15 April 2024 it was confirmed that Hrgović would face former world title challenger Daniel Dubois in a title eliminator on 1 June 2024. Hrgović lost the fight via eighth-round TKO, with the ringside doctor stopping the fight due to cuts, though he was ahead on the scorecards at the time of the stoppage.

==== Hrgović vs Joyce ====
Hrgović faced Joe Joyce at Co-op Live in Manchester, England, on 5 April 2025, winning by unanimous decision to claim the vacant WBO International heavyweight title. Hrgović was a late replacement for an injured Dillian Whyte in this bout.

==== Hrgović vs Adeleye ====
On 16 August 2025, he defeated David Adeleye by unanimous decision in Riyadh, Saudi Arabia, on the undercard of the Moses Itauma vs. Dillian Whyte fight.

==== Hrgović vs Allen ====
Hrgović fought David Allen at the Keepmoat Stadium in Doncaster, England, on 16 May 2026. He won by technical knockout when his opponent's corner threw in the towel in the third round.

=== IBF heavyweight champion ===
==== Hrgović vs Itauma ====
Hrgović fought Moses Itauma at The O2 Arena in London, England, on 29 August 2026, for the vacant IBF heavyweight title. He won through technical knockout in the ninth round and, in doing so, became the first Croatian heavyweight boxing world champion.

== Personal life ==
Hrgović has a daughter who was born in May 2024.

== Professional boxing record ==
22 fights	21 wins	1 loss
By knockout	16	1
By decision	5	0

No.	Result	Record	Opponent	Type	Round, time	Date	Location	Notes
22	Win	21–1	Moses Itauma	TKO	9 (12), 2:27	29 Aug 2026	The O2 Arena, London, England	Won vacant IBF heavyweight title
21	Win	20–1	David Allen	TKO	3 (10), 2:37	16 May 2026	Eco-Power Stadium, Doncaster, England	Retained WBA Continental Gold heavyweight title; Won vacant IBF Inter-Continental heavyweight titles
20	Win	19–1	David Adeleye	UD	10	16 Aug 2025	anb Arena, Riyadh, Saudi Arabia	Retained WBO International heavyweight title; Won vacant WBA Continental Gold heavyweight title
19	Win	18–1	Joe Joyce	UD	10	5 Apr 2025	Co-op Live, Manchester, England	Won vacant WBO International heavyweight title
18	Loss	17–1	Daniel Dubois	TKO	8 (12), 0:57	1 Jun 2024	Kingdom Arena, Riyadh, Saudi Arabia	For vacant IBF interim heavyweight title
17	Win	17–0	Mark de Mori	TKO	1 (12), 1:46	23 Dec 2023	Kingdom Arena, Riyadh, Saudi Arabia	
16	Win	16–0	Demsey McKean	TKO	12 (12), 1:01	12 Aug 2023	The O2 Arena, London, England	
15	Win	15–0	Zhilei Zhang	UD	12	20 Aug 2022	King Abdullah Sports City, Jeddah, Saudi Arabia	
14	Win	14–0	Emir Ahmatovic	TKO	3 (10), 0:30	4 Dec 2021	MGM Grand Garden Arena, Paradise, Nevada, US	Retained IBF International heavyweight title
13	Win	13–0	Marko Radonjic	RTD	3 (10), 3:00	10 Sep 2021	Wörthersee Stadion, Klagenfurt, Austria	Retained IBF International heavyweight title
12	Win	12–0	Rydell Booker	TKO	5 (10), 2:20	7 Nov 2020	Seminole Hard Rock Hotel & Casino, Hollywood, Florida, US	Won vacant IBF International heavyweight title
11	Win	11–0	Alexandre Kartozia	KO	2 (8), 1:04	26 Sep 2020	Struer Arena, Struer, Denmark	
10	Win	10–0	Éric Molina	KO	3 (12), 2:03	7 Dec 2019	Diriyah Arena, Diriyah, Saudi Arabia	Retained WBC International heavyweight title
9	Win	9–0	Mario Heredia	KO	3 (10), 0:33	24 Aug 2019	Centro de Usos Multiples, Hermosillo, Mexico	Retained WBC International heavyweight title
8	Win	8–0	Gregory Corbin	KO	1 (10), 1:00	25 May 2019	MGM National Harbor, Oxon Hill, Maryland, US	Retained WBC International heavyweight title
7	Win	7–0	Kevin Johnson	UD	8	8 Dec 2018	Dražen Petrović Basketball Hall, Zagreb, Croatia	
6	Win	6–0	Amir Mansour	KO	3 (12), 3:00	8 Sep 2018	Zagreb Arena, Zagreb, Croatia	Won vacant WBC International heavyweight title
5	Win	5–0	Filiberto Tovar	TKO	4 (10), 1:50	9 Jun 2018	Postpalast, Munich, Germany	
4	Win	4–0	Sean Turner	UD	8	24 Feb 2018	Arena Nürnberger Versicherung, Nuremberg, Germany	
3	Win	3–0	Tom Little	TKO	4 (8), 2:15	27 Jan 2018	Arēna Rīga, Rīga, Latvia	
2	Win	2–0	Pavel Sour	KO	1 (6), 2:59	27 Oct 2017	Sport- und Kongresshalle, Schwerin, Germany	
1	Win	1–0	Raphael Zumbano Love	TKO	1 (6), 1:40	30 Sep 2017	Arēna Rīga, Riga, Latvia	

== World Series of Boxing record ==
30 fights	26 wins	4 losses
By knockout	12	0
By decision	14	4

No.	Result	Record	Opponent	Type	Round, time	Date	Location	Notes
30	Win	26–4	Alessio Spahiu	TKO	2 (5), 1:30	25 Apr 2015	Italcementi Sports Center, Bergamo, Italy	
29	Win	25–4	Jose Medina	TKO	2 (5), 2:37	11 Apr 2015	Pedro Zorrilla Coliseo, San Juan, Puerto Rico	
28	Win	24–4	Gadzhi Murtazaliev	TKO	1 (5), 2:30	21 Mar 2015	Track and Field Sport Complex, Shymkent, Kazakhstan	
27	Win	23–4	Edgar Munoz	TKO	2 (5), 2:11	7 Mar 2015	Jose Maria Vargas Stadium, Maiquetía, Venezuela	
26	Win	22–4	Carlos Ortega	TKO	2 (5), 1:59	21 Feb 2015	Baluan Sholak Sports Palace, Almaty, Kazakhstan	
25	Win	21–4	Brandon Glanton	TKO	2 (5), 1:56	8 Feb 2015	Sapiyev Boxing Centre, Karaganda, Kazakhstan	
24	Win	20–4	Pawel Wierzbicki	UD	5	23 Jan 2015	Regional Sports Center, Lubin, Poland	
23	Win	19–4	Yoandy Toirac	TKO	5 (5)	10 Sep 2014	Daulet National Tennis Centre, Astana, Kazakhstan	
22	Loss	18–4	Gadzhi Murtazaliev	SD	5	3 May 2014	Quba Olympic Complex, Quba, Azerbaijan	
21	Win	18–3	Renat Rakhimov	TKO	2 (5)	7 Feb 2014	Foro Polanco, Mexico City, Mexico	
20	Win	17–3	José Larduet	TKO	3 (5), 2:25	13 Dec 2013	Baluan Sholak Sports Palace, Almaty, Kazakhstan	
19	Win	16–3	Sergey Kuzmin	UD	5	23 Nov 2013	Krestovsky Stadium, Saint Petersburg, Russia	
18	Win	15–3	Gerardo Bisbal	UD	5	12 Apr 2013	Zócalo, Mexico City, Mexico	
17	Loss	14–3	Joe Joyce	SD	5	7 Feb 2013	York Hall, London, England	
16	Win	14–2	Eric Brechlin	UD	5	12 Jan 2013	Stadthalle Hannover, Hannover, Germany	
15	Win	13–2	Mohammed Arjaoui	UD	5	8 Dec 2012	Baluan Sholak Sports Palace, Almaty, Kazakhstan	
14	Win	12–2	Rostyslav Arkhypenko	UD	5	16 Nov 2012	Acco International Exhibition Center, Kyiv, Ukraine	
13	Win	11–2	Ruslan Myrsatayev	UD	5	9 Jun 2012	ExCeL, London, England	
12	Win	10–2	Michal Olas	TKO	2 (5), 0:48	5 Mar 2012	Stade Pierre de Coubertin, Paris, France	
11	Win	9–2	Alexander Povernov	UD	5	17 Feb 2012	Stade Pierre de Coubertin, Paris, France	
10	Win	8–2	Abdulkadir Abdullayev	UD	5	4 Feb 2012	Sarhadchi Olympic Sports Center, Baku, Azerbaijan	
9	Loss	7–2	Viktar Zuyeu	UD	5	13 Jan 2012	Bağcılar Olympic Sport Hall, Istanbul, Turkey	
8	Win	7–1	Gadzhi Murtazaliev	UD	5	2 Dec 2011	Palais des Sports Marcel-Cerdan., Paris, France	
7	Win	6–1	Yusuf Acik	TKO	3 (5), 2:57	11 Nov 2011	Stade Pierre de Coubertin, Paris, France	
6	Win	5–1	Sardor Abdullaev	UD	5	7 May 2011	Stadium of Guizhou University, Guiyang, China	
5	Win	4–1	Sergei Kharitonov	UD	5	15 Apr 2011	Palais des sports Marcel-Cerdan, Paris, France	
4	Win	3–1	Oleksii Sivko	UD	5	25 Feb 2011	Ahmet Cömert Sport Hall, Istanbul, Turkey	
3	Loss	2–1	Vitaly Kudukhov	UD	5	5 Feb 2011	Barvikha Luxury Village Concert Hall, Barvikha, Russia	
2	Win	2–0	Islam Ismailov	UD	5	8 Jan 2011	Barvikha Luxury Village Concert Hall, Barvikha, Russia	
1	Win	1–0	Remzi Ozbek	RTD	2 (5), 3:00	17 Dec 2010	Halle Georges Carpentier, Paris, France	

== See also ==
- List of male boxers
- List of world heavyweight boxing champions

Sporting positions
Regional boxing titles
Vacant Title last held by Dillian Whyte	WBC International heavyweight champion 8 September 2018 – December 2020; Vacated	Vacant Title next held by Martin Bakole
Vacant Title last held by Tom Schwarz	IBF International heavyweight champion 7 November 2020 – June 2022; Vacated	Vacant Title next held by Nathan Gorman
Vacant Title last held by Martin Bakole	WBO International heavyweight champion 5 April 2025 – 29 August 2026; Vacated	Vacant
New title	WBA Continental Gold heavyweight champion 16 August 2025 – 29 August 2026; Vacated	Vacant
Vacant Title last held by Peter Kadiru	IBF Inter-Continental heavyweight champion 16 May – 29 August 2026; Won world title	Vacant
World boxing titles
Vacant Title last held by Oleksandr Usyk	IBF heavyweight champion 29 August 2026 – present	Incumbent
