= Mohamed Arjaoui =

Moroccan boxer

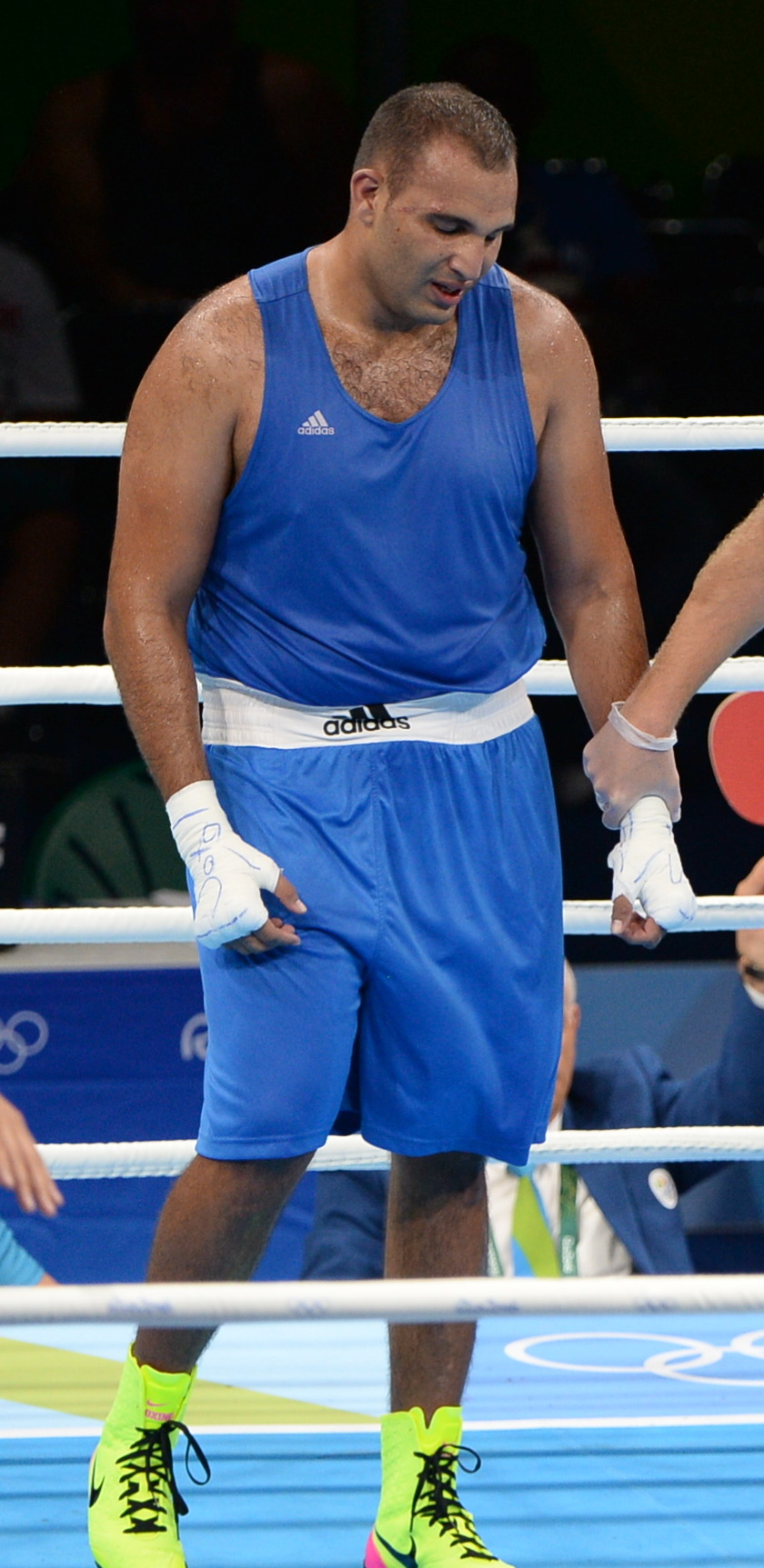
- Arjaoui at the 2016 Olympics

Personal information
- Born: 6 June 1987 (age 39) Mohammédia, Morocco
- Height: 186 cm (6 ft 1 in)

Sport
- Sport: Boxing
- Club: C Municipal Mohammédia
- Coached by: Mohamed Mesbahi
Medal record
Men's amateur boxing
Representing Morocco
African Championships
Gold medal – first place	2015 Casablanca	Super heavyweight
Silver medal – second place	2011 Yaoundé	Super heavyweight

Mohamed Al-Arjaoui (Arabic: محمد العرجاوي; born 6 June 1987) is a Moroccan heavyweight amateur boxer who won the African Championships in 2015. He competed at the 2008, 2012 and 2016 Olympics but was eliminated in the first or second bout on all occasions.
