= Super heavyweight =

Weight class in combat sports and competitive bodybuilding

Super heavyweight is a weight class in combat sports and competitive bodybuilding.

== Boxing ==
In amateur boxing, the super heavyweight division is a weight class division for fighters weighing in excess of 91 kilograms (200 pounds). Introduced for the 1984 Summer Olympics, the division is the amateur equivalent of the heavyweight division in professional boxing. The super heavyweight division was introduced because the general increase in the weight of top heavyweights throughout the 20th century meant that the heavyweight division became excessively broad, with the smaller men having little chance of competing effectively. Therefore, the bigger men were split off into the new super heavyweight division. Professional boxing also made this split, but instead of renaming the unlimited division, it introduced the cruiserweight division for the smaller heavyweights, and continued to call the unlimited division heavyweight. In the International Kickboxing Federation (IKF), the Super Heavyweight class (pro and amateur) is for kickboxers weighing 106.8 kilograms (235 lb) and above.

=== Olympic champions ===
- 1984 – Tyrell Biggs (USA)
- 1988 – Lennox Lewis (CAN)
- 1992 – Roberto Balado (CUB)
- 1996 – Wladimir Klitschko (UKR)
- 2000 – Audley Harrison (GBR)
- 2004 – Alexander Povetkin (RUS)
- 2008 – Roberto Cammarelle (ITA)
- 2012 – Anthony Joshua (GBR)
- 2016 – Tony Yoka (FRA)
- 2020 – Bakhodir Jalolov (UZB)
- 2024 – Bakhodir Jalolov (UZB)

== Mixed martial arts ==
The super heavyweight division in MMA generally refers to competitors weighing more than 265 lb (120 kg), as up to 265 a competitor is considered to be part of the heavyweight division. In modern MMA, no current major organisation has introduced an actual super heavyweight division. The WEC was the only major promotion to possess a Super Heavyweight championship (2005–2006). The WEC Super Heavyweight division was abolished in December 2006 when Zuffa purchased the organization.

== Professional wrestling ==
Although not generally used as a formal weight division in professional wrestling, the term "super heavyweight" is frequently used informally to refer to outsized wrestlers, typically with large obese physiques.

== Robot combat ==
Superheavyweight is a class in robot combat as well, with "superheavyweight" robots able to weigh up to 340 pounds.
