= Dillian Whyte vs. Christian Hammer =

Boxing competition

Once upon a Time in the West
- Date: 17 March 2024
- Venue: TF Royal Theatre, Castlebar, County Mayo, Ireland

Tale of the tape
Boxer	(United Kingdom) Dillian Whyte	(Romania) Christian Hammer
Nickname	"The Body Snatcher"	The Hammer
Hometown	Brixton, London, UK	Pechea, Galați, Romania
Pre-fight record	29–3 (20 KOs)	27–11 (17 KOs)
Age	34 years, 11 months	35 years, 5 months
Height	1.93 m (6 ft 4 in)	1.89 m (6 ft 2 in)
Weight	247 lb (112 kg)	275 lb (125 kg)
Style	Orthodox	Orthodox
Recognition	Former WBC interim heavyweight champion	

Result
- Whyte defeated Hammer after the third-round by corner retirement

Dillian Whyte vs Christian Hammer, billed as Once Upon a Time in the West, was a heavyweight professional boxing match contested between former WBC interim heavyweight champion Dillian Whyte and Christian Hammer. The bout took place on 17 March 2024, Saint Patrick's Day at the TF Royal Theatre in Castlebar, County Mayo, Ireland.

== Background ==
It was Whyte's first professional boxing fight in 16 months. He was scheduled to have a rematch against Anthony Joshua but failed a drug test. An investigation later found the positive drug test to be a result of a contaminated supplement and Whyte was cleared to resume his boxing career. He told Sky Sports ahead of the fight: "I'm just glad to be back, doing what I love doing. I'm not getting any younger," "Obviously there's a lot of good fights going on. I just want to get back in the mix. I still want to fight all of these guys and show that I'm still one of the best heavyweights around." Whyte last fought Jermaine Franklin at Wembley Arena, London in November 2022. Platform Sport, which was run by Michael Ofo, promoted their debut show, which was also sold out. For the fight, Whyte weighed 257 pounds, while Hammer weighed 274 pounds.

== The fight ==
Hammer failed to get up from his stool for the start of the fourth round, handing Whyte the win via corner retirement. The opening two rounds were evenly matched. Whyte landed to the head and body or Hammer, who also had little trouble in landing clean shots to Whyte's head. In round 3, Whyte landed hard body shots, constantly backing Hammer against the ropes. Whyte was frustrated following the win as he had prepared hard for the fight. Whyte called Hammer a coward after the fight, also noting that he approached the fight in a very negative manner. Trainer McGirt wanted Whyte to be active in 2024, mentioning a possible fight again in the Summer. McGirt also believed Whyte could still win a world title.

== Undercard ==
The card also featured the last boxing match of Ray Moylette's career, who fought in his hometown in a victory over Argentine Reuquen Cona Facundo Arce. Other matches on the card featured Thomas Carty defeating Pavel Sour, and Gary 'Spike' O'Sullivan lost to Sofiane Khati.

Confirmed bouts:

Preceded by vs. Jermaine Franklin	Dillian Whyte's bouts 17 March 2024	Succeeded by vs. Ebenezer Tetteh
Preceded by vs. Joe Joyce	Christian Hammer's bouts 17 March 2024	Succeeded by vs. Artem Suslenkov
