= Dillian Whyte vs Jermaine Franklin =

Boxing competition

Maximum Violence
- Date: 26 November 2022
- Venue: Wembley Arena, Wembley, London, UK

Tale of the tape
Boxer	(United Kingdom) Dillian Whyte	(United States) Jermaine Franklin
Nickname	"The Body Snatcher"	"989 Assassin"
Hometown	Brixton, London, UK	Saginaw, Michigan, US
Pre-fight record	28–3 (19 KOs)	21–0 (14 KOs)
Age	34 years, 7 months	29 years, 1 month
Height	6 ft 4 in (193 cm)	6 ft 2 in (188 cm)
Weight	253 1/4 lb (115 kg)	257 lb (117 kg)
Style	Orthodox	Orthodox
Recognition	WBC; No. 7 Ranked Heavyweight; IBF; No. 9 Ranked Heavyweight; The Ring/TBRB; No. 5 Ranked Heavyweight	WBO; No. 12 Ranked Heavyweight

Result
- Whyte wins via MD (115-115, 116-112, 116-112)

Dillian Whyte vs. Jermaine Franklin, billed as Maximum Violence was a professional heavyweight boxing match contested between former WBC interim heavyweight champion Dillian Whyte and Jermaine Franklin.

The bout was held at the Wembley Arena, London, England on the 26 November 2022.

== Background ==
After his world title shot against Tyson Fury in April ended in a stoppage defeat, on 30 September 2022, Whyte appointed Hall of Famer Buddy McGirt as his head trainer replacing Xavier Miller and Harold Knight. McGirt, a well known trainer, previously had trained the likes of Arturo Gatti, Vernon Forrest, Antonio Tarver and Sergey Kovalev. In 2002, Boxing Writers Association of America named McGirt trainer of the year. According to Whyte, McGirt doesn't change a boxers style, rather adds to the style, to make it stronger.

On 19 October, multiple reports confirmed Whyte (28-3, 19 KOs) would make his ring return in a scheduled 12 round bout against American contender Franklin (21-0, 14 KOs) on 26 November at the OVO Arena Wembley in London. This would mark only Franklin's second fight in three years and his first professional bout outside the United States. Two days later, the fight and card was made official and would stream on DAZN worldwide. Speaking to The DAZN Boxing Show, Hearn told fans, if Whyte was to win this fight and avoid injuries, he would be favourite to fight Anthony Joshua in 2023, a rematch from their 2015 fight. Joshua was also open to the rematch. Going into the fight, Whyte was aiming for a knockout win. Whyte weighed 251 pounds for the fight and Franklin, slightly heavier, at 257 pounds.

== The fight ==
In an uneventful bout, which went the 12 round distance, Whyte won via majority decision by the scores of 115–115 and 116–112 (twice). In the opening rounds, Franklin had Whyte on the backfoot and controlled the rounds, out-landing him with the jab. In the round 3, Whyte attacked the body. During the mid rounds, Whyte continued to land, however Franklin did well to counter. Whyte continued to control the mid rounds with his body work. Both boxers were warned by referee John Latham. Whyte was warned in round 9 for not breaking breaking and Franklin in round 11 for use of head. There was back and forth action in the last round with Whyte connecting the eye-catching left hand to Franklin's chin, causing him to back up against the ropes. According to CompuBox, Franklin landed 165 of his 606 punches thrown (27.2%), 105 of which were power punches. Whyte connected with 144 of 608 punches thrown (23.2%). Over the distance, Franklin landed 23 more body punches.

== Aftermath ==
Many thought Whyte was lucky to have taken the win, with many observers feeling Franklin should have win, or a draw was a fair result. Whyte shrugged this off, calling it a close affair and a close but clear win for himself and said he pressed more in the fight. Whyte admitted he had spoken with his team and would have retired, had he lost the fight. Franklin felt he did enough, especially in the earlier rounds to earn the victory and wanted a rematch in the future. During the post-fight press conference, reporters kept asking about a possible rematch, to which Whyte responded, “Why you keep getting in about this rematch?. Are you part of Jermaine Franklin’s team? […] Relax, man. Listen, it was a fight. How much close fights have there been in boxing? Do you like say, ‘Oh, this guy should have a rematch, have a rematch.’ You’re just talkin’ sh*t, man. Relax. It was a close fight. I won clearly, so why would I consider a rematch?”

== Fight card ==
Weight Class		vs.		Method	Round	Time	Notes
Heavyweight	(United Kingdom) Dillian Whyte	def.	(United States) Jermaine Franklin	MD	12
Heavyweight	(United Kingdom) Fabio Wardley	def.	(United Kingdom) Nathan Gorman	TKO	3/12	2:33
Light welterweight	(United Kingdom) Sandy Ryan	def.	(Argentina) Anahí Ester Sánchez	UD	10
Cruiserweight	(United Kingdom) Cheavon Clarke	def.	(Argentina) Jose Gregorio Ulrich	TKO	2/8	0:32
Welterweight	(United Kingdom) Pat McCormack	def.	(Argentina) Christian Nicolas Andino	PTS	6
Middleweight	(United Kingdom) Mark Dickinson	def.	(United Kingdom) Gideon Onyenani	PTS	6
Heavyweight	(Republic of Ireland) Thomas Carty	def.	(Ukraine) Pavlo Krolenko	TKO	5/6	1:12
Middleweight	(United Kingdom) George Liddard	def.	(Bosnia and Herzegovina) Nikola Matic	TKO	2/4	0:25

Preceded by vs. Tyson Fury	Dillian Whyte' bouts 26 November 2022	Succeeded by ~~vs. Anthony Joshua II~~ vs. Christian Hammer
Preceded by vs. Rodney Moore	Jermaine Franklin's bouts 26 November 2022	Succeeded by vs. Anthony Joshua
