= Anthony Joshua vs. Jermaine Franklin =

Boxing competition

New Dawn
- Date: 1 April 2023
- Venue: The O2 Arena, Greenwich, London, UK

Tale of the tape
Boxer	(United Kingdom) Anthony Joshua	(United States) Jermaine Franklin
Nickname	"AJ"	"989 Assassin"
Hometown	Watford, Hertfordshire, UK	Saginaw, Michigan, US
Pre-fight record	24–3 (22 KOs)	21–1 (14 KOs)
Age	33 years, 5 months	29 years, 5 months
Height	6 ft 6 in (198 cm)	6 ft 2 in (188 cm)
Weight	255 lb (116 kg)	234 lb (106 kg)
Style	Orthodox	Orthodox
Recognition	WBA/The Ring; No. 3 Ranked Heavyweight; IBF/TBRB; No. 4 Ranked Heavyweight; WBC/WBO; No. 5 Ranked Heavyweight; Former 2 time unified heavyweight champion	WBC; No. 25 Ranked Heavyweight

Result
- Joshua wins via 12–round unanimous decision (118–111, 117–111, 117–111)

Anthony Joshua vs. Jermaine Franklin, billed as New Dawn was a heavyweight boxing match contested between former two-time unified heavyweight champion Anthony Joshua and Jermaine Franklin. The bout was held at the O2 Arena in Greenwich, London.

== Background ==
Following Joshua's back-to-back losses to Oleksandr Usyk, the latter in August of 2022 in Saudi Arabia, Tyson Fury called out Anthony Joshua for a fight in November or December of that same year. However, the fight failed to come to fruition, due to sponsorship issues. Franklin fought Dillian Whyte at Wembley Arena in London, England on November 26, 2022. Whyte won by majority decision, although the decision of that fight was controversial with many scoring the fight as a draw or for Franklin winning.

On 6 February 2023, it was officially announced that Joshua would be returning to the ring on 1 April at The O2 Arena against Franklin. The fight would mark the first fight as part of his exclusive five-year deal with sports streaming service DAZN. In the first pre-fight press conference on 9 February, Joshua announced his new partnership with American trainer Derrick James, as well as being questioned by his promoter Eddie Hearn on his motivation for fighting. Joshua answered by repeatedly stating, "Money, money, money", before Hearn had finished asking the question, before further elaborating: “I like making money. Straight up. Like, this is a prize fighting sport."

== The fight ==
Joshua won a unanimous decision victory over Franklin, regaining momentum while demonstrating a strategic combination of jabs and powerful right hands. Joshua began the fight with effective jabs and combinations, successfully controlling the ring space. Although Franklin landed a few body shots and left hooks, he found it challenging to breach Joshua's reach. In the middle rounds, Franklin sought to establish a rhythm and engage Joshua in close quarters. Joshua countered with body shots and uppercuts, gradually wearing down Franklin. He delivered significant uppercuts and body hooks as Franklin relied on clinches to disrupt Joshua's flow. As the fight progressed, Joshua's stamina became an advantage as Franklin started to tire. In the later rounds, Joshua intensified his attack with combinations of right hands and a powerful uppercut in round 10, which notably affected Franklin, who was becoming fatigued but remained resilient. Joshua continued to deliver impactful body shots and uppercuts. The bout concluded with a minor altercation outside the ring between Joshua and Franklin’s corner. Clinches were frequent as Franklin attempted to control the pace and limit Joshua’s opportunities to land punches. The judges scored the fight 118-111, 117-111, and 117-111, in favor of Joshua.

== Aftermath ==
After the fight Joshua's promoter Eddie Hearn said "There may be an opportunity to do the Tyson Fury fight next. If it is there, it'll be difficult for AJ not to take it. He may think he will never get it. The sensible thing is to have another fight with Derrick James to improve; Dillian Whyte is a great option.

Franklin received recognition for his resilience and durability, managing to reach the final bell despite being outmatched and maintaining control in segments of the early rounds.

== Fight card ==
Confirmed bouts:

Weight Class		vs.		Method	Round	Time	Notes
Main Card
Heavyweight	Anthony Joshua	def.	Jermaine Franklin	UD	12/12
Heavyweight	Fabio Wardley	def.	Michael Polite Coffie	TKO	4/10	0:45	^{Note 1}
Flyweight	Galal Yafai	def.	Moisés Calleros	TKO	4/10	0:44
Welterweight	Campbell Hatton	def.	Louis Fielding	KO	1/8	1:29
Middleweight	Austin Williams	def.	River Wilson-Bent	TKO	8/10	1:01
Before The Bell Preliminary Card
Light heavyweight	John Hedges	def.	Daniel Bocianski	PTS	8/8
Super featherweight	Ziyad Almaayouf	def.	Georgi Velichkov	PTS	4/4
Super featherweight	Jordan Flynn	def.	Kane Baker	PTS	8/8
Cruiserweight	Benoit Huber	def.	Juergen Uldedaj	PTS	8/8
Heavyweight	Peter Kadiru	def.	Alen Lauriolle	RTD	1/4	3:00

^Note 1 For WBA Continental heavyweight title

Preceded by vs. Oleksandr Usyk II	Anthony Joshua' bouts 1 April 2023	Succeeded by ~~vs. Dillian Whyte II~~ vs. Robert Helenius
Preceded by vs. Dillian Whyte	Jermaine Franklin's bouts 1 April 2023	Succeeded by vs. Isaac Munoz Gutierrez
