= Derek Chisora vs. Joseph Parker =

Boxing match

- Date: 1 May 2021
- Venue: Manchester Arena, Manchester, UK
- Title(s) on the line: vacant WBO Inter-Continental heavyweight title

Tale of the tape
Boxer	Derek Chisora	Joseph Parker
Nickname	"War"	"Lupesoliai La'auliolemalietoa"
Hometown	Finchley, London, UK	South Auckland, Auckland, New Zealand
Pre-fight record	32–10 (23 KO)	28–2 (21 KO)
Age	37 years, 4 months	29 years, 3 months
Height	6 ft 2 in (188 cm)	6 ft 4 in (193 cm)
Weight	250 1/2 lb (114 kg)	241 1/4 lb (109 kg)
Style	Orthodox	Orthodox
Recognition	WBC; No. 15 Ranked Heavyweight	WBO; No. 3 Ranked Heavyweight; IBF; No. 4 Ranked Heavyweight; WBC; No. 6 Ranked Heavyweight

Result
- Parker wins via 12–round split decision (113–115, 116–111, 115–113)

Derek Chisora vs. Joseph Parker, was a professional boxing match contested between Derek Chisora, and former heavyweight champion and WBO Oriental heavyweight champion, Joseph Parker. The bout took place on 1 May 2021 at the AO Arena, with Parker winning by split decision.

== Background ==
On 31 August 2019, a fight between Chisora and Parker was announced to take place at the O2 Arena in London on 26 October 2019, with the bout taking place as the co-main event to the World Boxing Super Series: Light welterweight final between Regis Prograis and Josh Taylor live on Sky Sports Box Office. On 2 October, it was announced Parker had been forced to withdraw from the fight due to a spider bite that was causing illness during training. On 8 October, David Price was announced as Chisora's replacement opponent. In the post-fight interview, after defeating Price, Chisora commented on potentially rescheduling the fight with Parker next "if we can get Joseph Parker ASAP, I'm ready to go, I hope this time he doesn't get a spider bite, so let's try and make that fight".

After the pair's respective fights against Oleksandr Usyk and against Junior Fa, on 19 March 2021, a fight between Chisora and Parker was announced to take place at the AO Arena in Manchester on 1 May 2021. At the weigh-in for the fight, the event looked to be in jeopardy as Chisora threatened to pull out, after refusing to participate in a coin toss, which would determine who would have to walk to the ring first. Promoter Eddie Hearn and Chisora's manager Haye, proceeded with the coin toss, with Chisora losing, which he objected to. The dispute was resolved on the day of the fight, and the fight went ahead as planned.

== Fight details ==
From the opening bell, Chisora started a fast pace, sending Parker to the canvas with an overhand right, just seven seconds into the first round. As the early rounds progressed, Chisora continued to fight aggressively on the front foot, closing the distance and applying sustained pressure, landing hooks to body and head on the inside, forcing Parker to be backed up against the ropes repeatedly. As Parker worked behind the jab, boxing at long range defensively. In the middle rounds, Chisora maintained his high output and remained on the offensive, pressing forward, successfully landing a series of hard right hands and body shots. With Parker responding, leading with solid jabs and quick combination punches on the outside. In the later rounds, Chisora continued setting the pace, fighting up close, attempting to outwork Parker with his output. As Parker rallied in the latter stages, feinting effectively with his left hand and throwing several scoring flurries on the back foot. With both Chisora and Parker exchanging punches in the final round. Parker won by a controversial split decision with scores of 116–111, 115–113 in his favour, and 115–113 in favour of Chisora. Compubox showed that Chisora landed 245 of his 613 punches thrown (40%) and Parker landed 181 of his 593 thrown (31%). Chisora did have the edge on power punches, landing 195 compared to 133 from Parker.

== Aftermath ==
Following Parker's win, in the post-fight interview, Parker said "Derek is a very tough opponent" and "it was a very close fight, I thought it could go either way but I am very thankful and blessed to get the win today". Chisora felt as though he won the fight, saying "I train hard, I fight, I put the pressure on, I bring everything and this the treatment I get from boxing" and "I give everything in the gym, and when I put it all in there, this is the results I get". Chisora also stated Parker's trainer Andy Lee said he won the fight, which Lee replied saying "After the fight, Joe's came back and I said I'm not sure we got this" and "we're in this country and I thought he should get some fair play". Both Parker and Chisora expressed interest in an immediate rematch.

On 16 September 2021, it was announced that Parker and Chisora would square off in a rematch on 18 December, again at the AO Arena in Manchester, England. Parker defeated Chisora by unanimous decision.

== Fight card ==
Confirmed bouts:

Weight Class		vs.		Method	Round	Time	Notes
Heavyweight	Joseph Parker	def.	Derek Chisora	SD	12		^{Note 1}
Lightweight	Katie Taylor (c)	def.	Natasha Jonas	UD	12		^{Note 2}
Lightweight	Campbell Hatton	def.	Levi Dunn	PTS	4
Middleweight	Chris Eubank Jr	def.	Marcus Morrison	UD	10
Light-heavyweight	Dmitry Bivol (c)	def.	Craig Richards	UD	12		^{Note 3}
Heavyweight	Johnny Fisher	def.	Phil Williams	TKO	3/4	1:46
Lightweight	Jovanni Straffon	def.	James Tennyson	TKO	1/12	2:10	^{Note 4}
Super-middleweight	Scott Fitzgerald	def.	Gregory Trenel	TKO	3/8	2:43

^Note 1 For WBO Inter-Continental heavyweight title
^Note 2 For WBA, WBC, IBF, WBO and The Ring lightweight titles
^Note 3 For WBA (Super) light heavyweight title
^Note 4 For IBO lightweight title

== Broadcasting ==
Country	Broadcaster	
Country	PPV	Stream
United Kingdom	Sky Sports Box Office	—N/a
New Zealand	Spark Sports	—N/a
Worldwide	—N/a	DAZN

Preceded by vs. Oleksandr Usyk	Derek Chisora's bouts 1 May 2021	Succeeded by Rematch
Preceded by vs. Junior Fa	Joseph Parker's bouts 1 May 2021	Succeeded by Rematch
