= Anthony Joshua vs. Robert Helenius =

Boxing match

- Date: 12 August 2023
- Venue: The O2 Arena, Greenwich, London, UK

Tale of the tape
Boxer	Anthony Joshua	Robert Helenius
Nickname	"AJ"	"The Nordic Nightmare"
Hometown	Watford, Hertfordshire, UK	Lumparland, Åland, Finland
Pre-fight record	25–3 (22 KOs)	32–4 (21 KO)
Age	33 years, 9 months	39 years, 7 months
Height	6 ft 6 in (198 cm)	6 ft 6 1/2 in (199 cm)
Weight	250 lb (113 kg)	249.4 lb (113 kg)
Style	Orthodox	Orthodox
Recognition	WBO; No. 2 Ranked Heavyweight; WBC/WBA/IBF/The Ring/TBRB; No. 3 Ranked Heavyweight; Former 2 time unified heavyweight champion	Former two-time European heavyweight champion

Result
- Joshua wins via 7th-round KO

Anthony Joshua vs. Robert Helenius, professional boxing match contested between former WBA (Super), IBF, WBO, and IBO heavyweight champion, Anthony Joshua and Robert Helenius. The bout took place on 12 August 2023 at The O2 Arena, with Joshua winning by knockout in the seventh round.

The bout was originally scheduled as Dillian Whyte vs. Anthony Joshua II, a rematch of the 12 December 2015 bout. This was cancelled and Helenius replaced Whyte after Whyte returned a positive drug test conducted by the voluntary anti-doping agency.

The bout took place on 12 August 2023 at The O2 Arena in London, England. Joshua defeated Helenius via knockout in the 7th round.

== Background ==
Following Joshua's unanimous decision victory against Jermaine Franklin in April 2023, Joshua stated that he plans to have one more bout before his rumoured bout with Deontay Wilder in Saudi Arabia. On 6 July 2023 it was announced that Joshua would rematch Dillian Whyte on 12 August at The O2 Arena in London, England on DAZN PPV. On 5 August, it was announced that Whyte returned a positive drug test conducted by the voluntary anti-doping agency. A number of individuals such as Gerald Washington and Derek Chisora were considered to replace Whyte. Helenius was announced on 8 August 2023 as the replacement fighter. After Whyte's removal from the card, the fight was made free-to-air.

== Fight details ==
After boxing relativity tentatively for the first six round, Joshua scored a one punch knockout in the 7th, with a double feint followed by a right sending the Finn to the canvas, with referee Victor Loughlin stopping the bout without completing a count.

== Aftermath ==
After the bout there was immediately talk of a long awaited bout between Joshua and fellow former heavyweight champion Deontay Wilder, possibly in January 2024.

Helenius failed a drug test following the fight and was provisionally suspended. In July 2024 he was given a two-year ban by UK Anti-Doping. He tested positive for clomifene, although the boxer denied intentional doping and blamed the consumption of contaminated egg and chicken. The ban was backdated to when he was first provisionally suspended meaning he will be eligible to fight again on 18 September 2025.

== Fight card ==
Weight Class		vs.		Method	Round	Time	Notes
Main Card
Heavyweight	Anthony Joshua	def.	Robert Helenius	KO	7/12	1:27
Heavyweight	Derek Chisora	def.	Gerald Washington	UD	10
Heavyweight	Filip Hrgović	def.	Demsey McKean	TKO	12/12	1:01
Heavyweight	Johnny Fisher	def.	Harry Armstrong	TKO	7/10	1:19	^{Note 1}
Super lightweight	Campbell Hatton	def.	Tom Ansell	UD	8
Preliminary Card
Middleweight	George Liddard	def.	Bas Oosterweghe	UD	6
Featherweight	Brandon Scott	def.	Louis Norman	UD	6
Super flyweight	Maiseyrose Courtney	def.	Gemma Ruegg	UD	6

^Note 1 For vacant Southern Area heavyweight championship

== Broadcasting ==
Country	Broadcaster
Country	Stream
Worldwide	DAZN

Preceded by vs. Jermaine Franklin	Anthony Joshua' bouts 12 August 2023	Succeeded by vs. Otto Wallin
Preceded by vs. Mika Mielonen	Robert Helenius's bouts 12 August 2023	Succeeded by TBA
