= Kristian Prenga =

Albanian boxer (born 1991)

Personal information
- Nickname: The Eagle
- Born: Kristian Prenga; 24 January 1991 (age 35) Orosh, Albania
- Height: 6 ft 5 in (196 cm)
- Weight: Heavyweight

Boxing career
- Reach: 196 cm (77 in)
- Stance: Orthodox

Boxing record
- Total fights: 22
- Wins: 20
- Win by KO: 20
- Losses: 2

Kristian Prenga (born 24 January 1991) is an Albanian professional boxer.

== Early life ==
Prenga has stated that despite difficult economic conditions, he had a happy childhood. He learned how to drive a truck when he was 8 years old to help his father work in the mountains. He gained an interest in boxing after going to the gym to lose weight. He also trained in kickboxing.

== Professional career ==
Prenga made his professional debut on 7 May 2016, defeating veteran Pavel Siska by second-round knockout in Munich, Germany.

Prenga suffered an early setback in the fifth fight of his career. He suffered a points deduction and ultimately a points defeat to Dutch journeyman Giovanni Auriemma. Prengas biggest win of his career came against American gatekeeper Joey Dawejko. Prenga won by stoppage in the fifth round after Dawejko complained about a bicep injury. Prenga became one of the best ticket sellers in New Jersey. He knocked out American Juan Torres at the 2300 Arena in Philadelphia, dropping Torres three times in the first round and twice more in the second round before the referee stopped the fight.

=== Prenga vs. Joshua ===
On 27 April 2026, it was announced that Prenga would face former two-time heavyweight world champion Anthony Joshua in Riyadh, Saudi Arabia as a warm-up fight for Joshua's planned bout with Tyson Fury later in 2026. The bout was streamed on DAZN on 25 July 2026, taking place at the same time as the Esports World Cup in Boulevard City. Prenga knocked Joshua down twice in the first round, with the first knockdown coming just 20 seconds into the bout, although Joshua went on to win by knockout in the second round. The bout was highly controversial, with many viewers and pundits questioning its authenticity, owing to Prenga's hesitant and lethargic approach in the second round given the success he had in the first. Former 2-division world champion Paulie Malignaggi explored his own thoughts regarding the fight potentially being fixed on Talksport, stating that "A lot of powerful people make a lot of money if you make AJ vs Fury. So, is it possible that somebody whispered into the Prenga corner? I'm just giving a conspiracy theory, don't shoot the messenger.", going on to say "I'm not saying it's necessarily what I believe. Okay. I mean, it's certainly in my mind. It's certainly something I'm thinking about because I'm still trying to come to terms with a guy who was throwing a bunch of punches and landed them and hurt his opponent and all of a sudden just decided to hit the pause button and say, "You know what? I'm not going to throw any punches in round two. You know, I don't want to win this fight." I don't know. It was weird".

== Personal life ==
Prenga is Catholic.

== Professional boxing record ==
22 fights	20 wins	2 losses
By knockout	20	1
By decision	0	1

No.	Result	Record	Opponent	Type	Round, time	Date	Location	Notes
22	Loss	20–2	Anthony Joshua	KO	2 (12), 2:43	25 Jul 2026	Jeddah Superdome, Jeddah, Saudi Arabia	
21	Win	20–1	Joe Jones	TKO	1 (8), 1:57	21 Feb 2026	Showboat Hotel & Casino, Atlantic City, New Jersey, US	
20	Win	19–1	Brandon Carmack	KO	1 (8), 1:35	6 Dec 2025	Ballys Park Place Hotel Casino, Atlantic City, New Jersey, US	
19	Win	18–1	Willie Jake Jr	TKO	1 (8), 2:26	4 Apr 2025	Radisson Hotel Southfield, Detroit, Michigan, US	
18	Win	17–1	Juan Torres	TKO	2 (10), 1:16	18 Jan 2025	2300 Arena, Philadelphia, Pennsylvania, US	
17	Win	16–1	Joey Dawejko	TKO	5 (8), 0:41	12 Oct 2024	Prudential Center, Newark, New Jersey, US	
16	Win	15–1	Christoper Arnold	TKO	1 (8), 2:27	29 Dec 2023	Prudential Center, Newark, New Jersey, US	
15	Win	14–1	Santander Silgado Gelez	KO	1 (10), 1:22	22 Jul 2023	Boardwalk Hall, Atlantic City, New Jersey, US	
14	Win	13–1	Samuel Crossed	KO	3 (10), 0:31	25 Mar 2023	Boardwalk Hall, Atlantic City, New Jersey, US	Won vacant WBA-NABA heavyweight title
13	Win	12–1	Alvin Davie	TKO	2 (6), 1:32	12 Nov 2022	Showboat Hotel, Atlantic City, New Jersey, US	
12	Win	11–1	DeShon Webster	KO	2 (6), 1:09	29 Apr 2022	2300 Arena, Philadelphia, Pennsylvania, US	
11	Win	10–1	Samuel Miller	KO	1 (8), 1:35	17 Jul 2021	Coliseo Luis Patron Rosano, Tolú, Colombia	
10	Win	9–1	Aldo Colliander	TKO	6 (6), 2:16	15 Dec 2018	Coca-Cola Coliseum, Toronto, Ontario, Canada	
9	Win	8–1	Ricardo Humberto Ramirez	KO	3 (6), 1:44	19 May 2018	Air Canada Centre, Toronto, Ontario, Canada	
8	Win	7–1	Tim Chemelli	TKO	2 (6), 1:06	24 Mar 2018	Metro Toronto Convention Centre, Toronto, Ontario, Canada	
7	Win	6–1	Alfredo Trevino	TKO	2 (6), 0:46	1 Dec 2017	Scotiabank Convention Centre, Niagara Falls, Ontario, Canada	
6	Win	5–1	Jaime Barajas	KO	1 (4), 1:08	30 Jun 2017	Scotiabank Convention Centre, Niagara Falls, Ontario, Canada	
5	Loss	4–1	Giovanni Auriemma	PTS	8	18 Feb 2017	Rabo Theater De Meenthe, Steenwijk, Netherlands	
4	Win	4–0	Dejan Krneta	TKO	3 (4), 0:37	26 Nov 2016	Loewensaal, Nuremberg, Germany	
3	Win	3–0	Giovanni Auriemma	TKO	4 (4), 2:34	22 Oct 2016	Sporthalle, Berlin, Germany	
2	Win	2–0	Haris Radmilovic	KO	2 (4), 1:11	8 Oct 2016	Kampfsportcenter, Munich, Germany	
1	Win	1–0	Pavel Siska	TKO	2 (4), 1:29	7 May 2016	Kampfsportcenter, Munich, Germany	
