= Campbell Hatton =

British former boxer (born 2001)

Personal information
- Nickname: Hurricane
- Born: 9 January 2001 (age 25) Manchester, England
- Height: 168 cm (5 ft 6 in)
- Weight: Lightweight

Boxing career
- Stance: Orthodox

Boxing record
- Total fights: 16
- Wins: 14
- Win by KO: 5
- Losses: 2

Campbell Hatton (born 9 January 2001) is a British professional boxer who competed from 2021 to 2024, and has since worked as a solar panel installer. He is the son of former two-division world champion boxer, Ricky Hatton.

== Early life ==
Hatton was born in Lancashire, United Kingdom.

== Professional career ==
Campbell made his professional-boxing debut on the undercard of Alexander Povetkin vs. Dillian Whyte II on 27 March 2021, where he defeated Spaniard Jesus Ruiz by points decision (PTS).

During the undercard of Anthony Joshua vs. Oleksandr Usyk on 25 September 2021, Hatton defeated Sonni Martinez by a controversial decision.

Hatton recorded his first knockout victory when he stopped Hungarian Attila Csereklye on 3 December 2021.

In March 2025, he hired his father Ricky to be his trainer. In July 2025, Ricky appeared in an interview confirming Campbell's retirement.

=== Misfits Boxing ===
In June 2026, Misfits Boxing announced during the broadcast of Misfits 23 – Beauty vs. The Beast that Hatton had signed with the promotion. During the announcement, Hatton hinted that a bout between himself and Sami Hamed, son of Naseem Hamed, was in negations.

== Personal life ==
Hatton is a supporter of Manchester City FC, and he wears the club's logo on his shorts during fights.

== Professional boxing record ==
16 fights	14 wins	2 losses
By knockout	5	0
By decision	8	2
By disqualification	1	0

No.	Result	Record	Opponent	Type	Round, time	Date	Location	Notes
16	Loss	14–2	James Flint	UD	10	26 Oct 2024	Co-op Live, Manchester, England	
15	Loss	14–1	James Flint	UD	10	23 Mar 2024	Sheffield Arena, Sheffield, England	For Central Area light-welterweight title
14	Win	14–0	Jamie Sampson	DQ	8 (8), 2:07	21 Oct 2023	M&S Bank Arena, Liverpool, England	Sampson disqualified for persistent holding
13	Win	13–0	Tom Ansell	PTS	8	12 Aug 2023	The O2 Arena, London, England	
12	Win	12–0	Michal Bulik	TKO	5 (8), 0:38	27 May 2023	Manchester Arena, Manchester, England	
11	Win	11–0	Louis Fielding	KO	1 (8), 1:29	1 Apr 2023	The O2 Arena, London, England	
10	Win	10–0	Michel Gonxhe	PTS	6	11 Mar 2023	Echo Arena, Liverpool, England	
9	Win	9–0	Denis Bartos	KO	1 (6), 1:44	5 Nov 2022	Etihad Arena, Abu Dhabi, United Arab Emirates	
8	Win	8–0	Michal Dufek	PTS	6	6 Aug 2022	Sheffield Arena, Sheffield, England	
7	Win	7–0	Ezequiel Gregores	PTS	6	14 Apr 2022	Manchester Arena, Manchester, England	
6	Win	6–0	Joe Ducker	TKO	6 (6), 2:23	27 Feb 2022	The O2 Arena, London, England	
5	Win	5–0	Attila Csereklye	KO	2 (6), 2:56	3 Dec 2021	Bilbao Arena, Bilbao, Spain	
4	Win	4–0	Sonni Martinez	PTS	6	25 Sep 2021	Tottenham Hotspur Stadium, London, England	
3	Win	3–0	Jakub Laskowski	PTS	4	31 Jul 2021	Matchroom HQ Garden, Brentwood, England	
2	Win	2–0	Levi Dunn	PTS	4	1 May 2021	Manchester Arena, Manchester, England	
1	Win	1–0	Jesus Ruiz	PTS	4	27 Mar 2021	Europa Point Sports Complex, Gibraltar	

== See also ==
- List of boxing families#Hatton family
