= Derrick James =

American boxer (born 1972)

Personal information
- Born: January 23, 1972 (age 54) Dallas, Texas, US
- Weight: Super Middleweight

Boxing career
- Stance: Orthodox

Boxing record
- Total fights: 29
- Wins: 21
- Win by KO: 12
- Losses: 7
- No contests: 1

Derrick James (born January 23, 1972) is an American boxing trainer and former professional boxer.

== Boxing career ==
James' boxing record was 21-7-1 (12 TKOs). He is a two-time winner of Texas State Golden Gloves and won a Bronze Medal at the U.S. Olympic Festival.

== Training career ==
James is the current trainer of Jermell Charlo, Ryan Garcia and Frank Martin. In addition, he is the previous trainer of Errol Spence and Anthony Joshua.

== Professional Boxing Record ==
29 fights	21 wins	7 losses
By knockout	12	4
By decision	9	3
No contests	1	

No.	Result	Record	Opponent	Type	Date	Location	Notes
29	Win	21-7 (1)	Martin Verdin	TKO	May 31, 2008	Fair Park, Dallas, U.S.	
28	Loss	20-7 (1)	Chris Henry	TKO	Aug 2, 2007	Grand Plaza Hotel, Houston, U.S.	
27	NC	20-7 (1)	Tim Harris	NC	Apr 21, 2007	Silverado Ranch, Irving, U.S.	Both boxers injured by accidental head clash
26	Win	19-7	Trenice Brown	TKO	Mar 2, 2007	Bella Aida Gardens, Houston, U.S.	

== Honors ==
- 2020 Sports Illustrated Trainer of the Year
- 2020 WBA Trainer of the Year
- 2020 WBC Trainer of the Year
- 2019 & 2020 Trill Trainer of the Year
- 2017 The Ring Magazine Trainer of the Year
