= Anthony Joshua =

British boxer (born 1989)

Anthony Joshua OBE
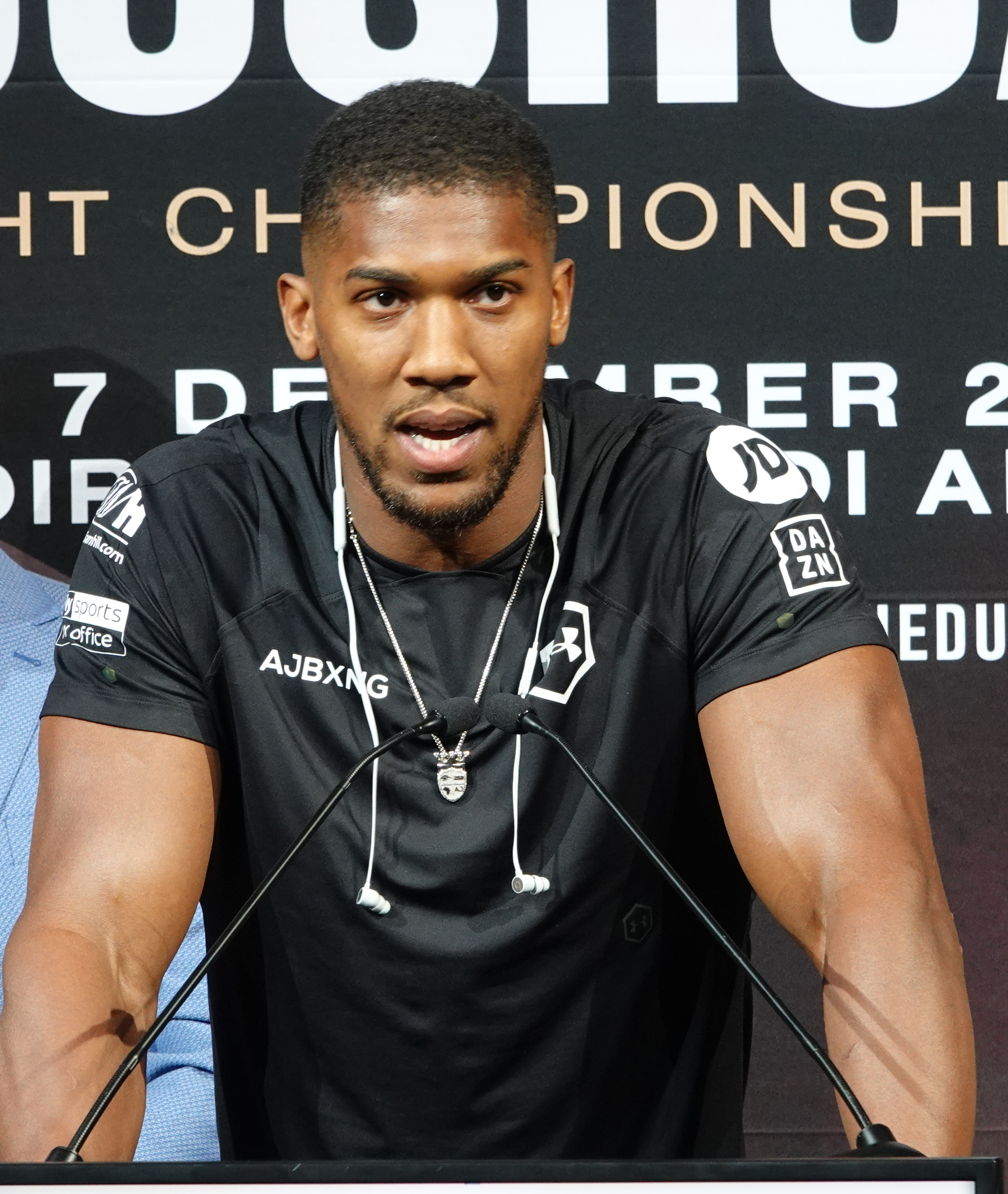
- Joshua in 2019

Personal information
- Nickname: AJ
- Born: Anthony Oluwafemi Olaseni Joshua; 15 October 1989 (age 37) Watford, Hertfordshire, England
- Height: 6 ft 6 in (198 cm)
- Weight: Heavyweight

Boxing career
- Reach: 82 in (208 cm)
- Stance: Orthodox

Boxing record
- Total fights: 34
- Wins: 30
- Win by KO: 27
- Losses: 4
Medal record
Men's amateur boxing
Representing Great Britain
Olympic Games
Gold medal – first place	2012 London	Super-heavyweight
World Championships
Silver medal – second place	2011 Baku	Super-heavyweight
ABA Championships
Gold medal – first place	2010 London	Super-heavyweight
Gold medal – first place	2011 Colchester	Super-heavyweight
Great Britain Championships
Gold medal – first place	2010 Liverpool	Super-heavyweight

Anthony Oluwafemi Olaseni "AJ" Joshua (Note: Pronounced by Joshua as /ˈænθəni ˌɒlʊwʌˈfɛmi ˌɒlæˈʃɛni ˈdʒɒʃuə/ AN-thə-nee ol-uu-wuh-FEM-ee o-la-SHEN-ee JOSH-oo-ə.; Nigerian pronunciation) (born 15 October 1989) is a British professional boxer. He held the unified (Note: World Boxing Association (WBA) (Super version), International Boxing Federation (IBF), and World Boxing Organization (WBO) titles.) heavyweight championship twice between 2017 and 2021. He also held the International Boxing Organization (IBO) title during his reigns as champion. At regional level, he held the British and Commonwealth heavyweight titles from 2015 to 2016.

As an amateur, Joshua represented England at the 2011 World Championships, winning the super-heavyweight silver medal. He also represented Great Britain at the 2012 Olympics, winning gold. In 2014, a year after turning professional, he was named Prospect of the Year by The Ring magazine. He won the IBF heavyweight title in 2016, the vacant WBA (Super) and IBO heavyweight titles in 2017, and the WBO heavyweight title in 2018. After losing his heavyweight titles to Andy Ruiz Jr. in June 2019 and regaining them in their December 2019 rematch, he later lost the unified titles to Oleksandr Usyk in 2021 and again in their 2022 rematch. In 2024, he challenged for the vacant IBF heavyweight title, losing to Daniel Dubois via knockout.

In 2017, Joshua's fight against Wladimir Klitschko was named Fight of the Year by The Ring and the Boxing Writers Association of America. Joshua was appointed Member of the Order of the British Empire (MBE) in 2013 and Officer of the Order of the British Empire (OBE) in 2018.

In 2017, Joshua was named the world's most marketable athlete by SportsPro magazine. Forbes ranked him among the world's 20 highest-paid athletes in 2019, 2020, and 2024, while he ranked 28th in 2023. As of 2026, Joshua is ranked as the eighth-wealthiest sports figure in Britain.

== Early life ==
Anthony Oluwafemi Olaseni Joshua was born on 15 October 1989 in Watford, Hertfordshire, the son of British Nigerian parents Yeta Odusanya and Robert Joshua, both of whom grew up in Sagamu. Joshua's Nigerian background can be specifically traced back to the Yoruba people, amongst whom he is of aristocratic rank through his great-grandfather Omo-Oba Daniel Adebambo Joshua, who was also one of the earliest Nigerians to trade with Europeans through the United Africa Company. Daniel had changed the family name from Odusole to Joshua after converting to Christianity. Joshua has Irish ancestry through his paternal grandmother, Moya V. Harper. Joshua's paternal grandfather Olaseni was an amateur boxer while his cousin, Gbenga "Ben" Ileyemi, is also a professional boxer. The pair made their professional debuts together in 2013.

Joshua spent some of his early years in Nigeria as a boarding school student at Mayflower School in Ikenne. Following his parents' divorce when he was 12, he returned to the UK halfway through Year Seven to join Kings Langley Secondary School. Growing up on the Meriden Estate in Garston, Hertfordshire, he was nicknamed "Femi" by his friends and former teachers, due to his middle name, Oluwafemi. He excelled at football and athletics and broke his school's Year Nine 100 m record with a time of 11.6 seconds.

== Amateur career ==
A late starter in the sport, Joshua began boxing in 2007, aged 18, when his cousin suggested he take it up. His club, Finchley ABC in Barnet, North London, is also home to professional heavyweight Derek Chisora. Joshua won the 2009 and 2010 Haringey Box Cup. Joshua also won the senior ABA Championships in 2010, in only his 18th bout, and later turned down £50,000 to turn professional. "Turning down that £50,000 was easy. I didn't take up the sport for money, I want to win medals." He also went on to win the same tournament the following year. In 2010 his domestic success earned him a place on the GB Boxing team and later the same year he became British amateur champion at the GB Championships after defeating Amin Isa. At the 2011 European Championships in June he beat the German Eric Brechlin 23:16 and the Irishman Cathal McMonagle 22:10 but was stopped by the Romanian southpaw Mihai Nistor after receiving several standing counts. In October 2011 he was named Amateur Boxer of the Year by the Boxing Writers Club of Great Britain. Joshua had an amateur record of 40–3.

During the 2011 World Championships in Baku, Azerbaijan, Joshua marked his sudden arrival on the world scene when he beat Italian reigning world and Olympic champion Roberto Cammarelle, and went on to stop Erik Pfeifer of Germany in the semis before losing by a single point to local boxer, Magomedrasul Majidov winning a silver medal. En route to the final, Joshua secured his place at the 2012 Olympic Games in the super-heavyweight division as a relative newcomer to the elite level of the sport.

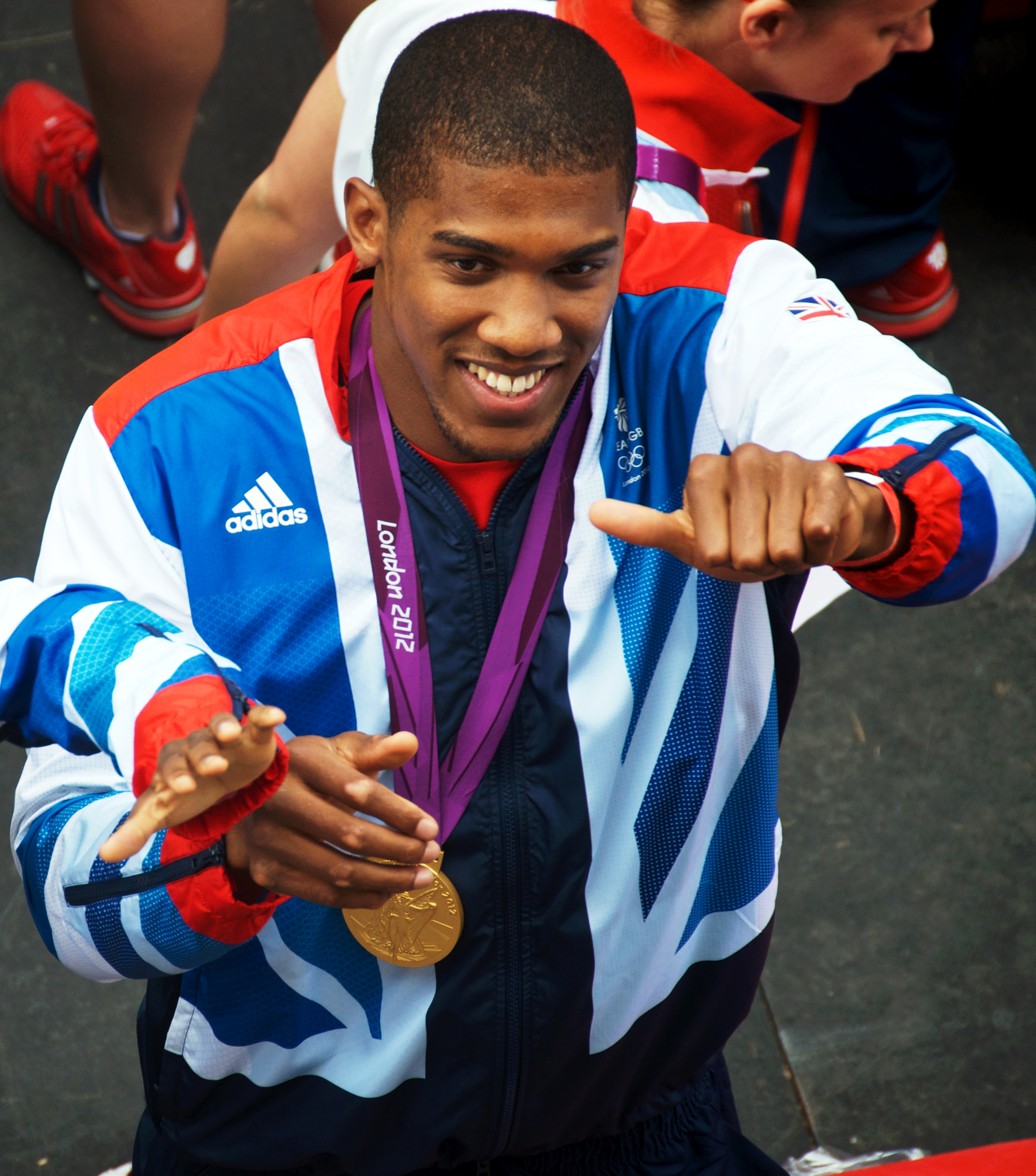
Joshua at the 2012 Summer Olympics

Joshua went into the 2012 London Olympics as a novice on the international scene, despite being a world silver medalist. He received a tough draw in the last 16 of the super-heavyweight event against Cuban Erislandy Savón, ranked No. 4 in the world by AIBA and nephew of the three time Olympic champion Félix Savón. The home boxer battled through three tough rounds in his opening contest before being given the result 17:16. This decision caused some controversy with most observers believing Savon had clearly won the bout whilst a few others taking the view that he had won on merit. In his next bout he fought 2008 Beijing Olympics silver medalist Zhang Zhilei, dropping his taller opponent in the middle round; Joshua won by 15:11 guaranteeing at least a bronze medal. In the semi-final Joshua met Kazakh boxer Ivan Dychko, and despite Joshua's height disadvantage he won by 13:11 to gain a place in the Olympic final. Joshua met 32-year-old reigning Olympic champion and former two-time world champion, Roberto Cammarelle of Italy in the closing bout. After conceding the first two rounds (6:5 and 13:10) to Cammarelle, an adversary he had already beaten the previous year, Joshua grew into the fight and fought back to level the scores after the third round (18:18). Joshua was announced winner via count-back and the new Olympic champion. The final decision was criticised by some boxing experts, being defined as a "home decision".

Joshua won Superstars 2012 for British Olympic athletes.

He was appointed Member of the Order of the British Empire (MBE) in the 2013 New Year Honours for services to boxing by Queen Elizabeth II, and later Officer of the Most Excellent Order of the British Empire (OBE) on December 2018 in Queen's Birthday's Honours by then Prince Charles.

=== Highlights ===
English National Championships results 2010

- Defeated Dominic Akinlade (England) PTS
- Defeated Luke Herdman (England) RSC–2
- Defeated N/A WO.
- Defeated Chris Duff (England) WO.
- Defeated Simon Hadden (England) WO.
- Defeated Dominic Winrow (England) RSC–1

2011

- Defeated N/A WO.
- Defeated N/A WO.
- Defeated Fayz Aboadi Abbas (England) 24–15.

Great Britain Championships results 2010

- Defeated Amin Isa (England) 6–3

International Amateur Boxing Tournament results 2010

- Defeated Otto Wallin (Sweden) PTS

England vs Ireland results 2010

- Defeated Chris Turner (Ireland) 6–3

AIBA World Boxing Championships results 2011

- Defeated Tariq Abdul-Haqq (Trinidad and Tobago) RSCI–3
- Defeated Juan Isidro Hiracheta (Mexico) AB–1
- Defeated Mohamed Arjaoui (Morocco) 16–7
- Defeated Roberto Cammarelle (Italy) 15–13
- Defeated Erik Pfeifer (Germany) RSCI–1
- Lost to Magomedrasul Medzhidov (Azerbaijan) 22–21

Algirdas Socikas Tournament results 2012

- Defeated Sean Turner (Ireland) 9–5
- Defeated Johan Linde (Australia) KO–1
- Defeated Aidas Petruskevicius (Lithuania) W0.

European Amateur Boxing Championships results 2011

- Defeated Eric Brechlin (Germany) 23–16
- Defeated Cathal McMonagle (Ireland) 22–10
- Lost to Mihai Nistor (Romania) RSCH–3

Bocskai Memorial results 2012

- Defeated Sergey Kuzmin (Russia) 9–7
- Defeated Sardor Abdullayev (Uzbekistan) RSC–3

Olympic Games results 2012

- Defeated Erislandy Savón (Cuba) 17–16
- Defeated Zhang Zhilei (China) 15–11
- Defeated Ivan Dychko (Kazakhstan) 13–11
- Defeated Roberto Cammarelle (Italy) +18–18

== Professional career ==
=== Early career ===
On 11 July 2013 it was confirmed that Joshua had turned professional under the Matchroom Sport promotional banner. Joshua made his professional debut on 5 October 2013 at the O2 Arena in London in the Main-Event of a card featuring Scott Quigg's successful WBA (Regular) super-bantamweight title defence against Yoandris Salinas, beating Italian Emanuele Leo by a technical knockout (TKO) in the first round. Joshua's second fight was against English heavyweight Paul Butlin at the Motorpoint Arena in Sheffield on 26 October 2013. The bout was stopped in the second round when the referee decided Butlin was taking too much punishment and declared Joshua the winner by TKO. Joshua's third fight was on the Prizefighter Series card against Croatian Hrvoje Kišiček on 14 November 2013. Joshua got a TKO victory in the second round, achieving his third knockout (KO) victory in a row.

In February 2014, Joshua scored a second-round TKO victory over Dorian Darch to take his record to 4–0. The following month, on the undercard of Ricky Burns against Terence Crawford, Joshua defeated Héctor Alfredo Ávila with a first-round KO, in Glasgow, Scotland. In May that year Joshua knocked out Matt Legg in one round on the undercard of Carl Froch vs. George Groves II at Wembley Stadium. In Joshua's seventh fight, on 12 July 2014 at the Echo Arena, Liverpool, he defeated Englishman Matt Skelton via second-round stoppage. In Joshua's eighth fight, on 13 September 2014, against German heavyweight Konstantin Airich, Joshua took his undefeated record to 8–0 with a third-round stoppage victory at the Manchester Arena.

Joshua was in the Main-Event of a Matchroom Sport card for the second time in his career, in his ninth professional appearance for the vacant WBC International heavyweight title against Dennis Bakhtov, the former champion looking to win the title for a second time, on 11 October 2014 at The O2 Arena in London. Joshua won the fight by KO in the second round, taking his record to 9–0 and winning the WBC International heavyweight title aged just 24.

In his tenth bout, on 22 November 2014, Joshua defeated Michael Sprott within the first round to extend his record to ten wins, all by stoppage. With the fight only lasting 1 minute and 26 seconds, it gave Joshua a total ring time in the professional ranks of just 36 minutes and 36 seconds.

He was supposed to face American boxer Kevin Johnson on 31 January 2015 at The O2 Arena in London, but the bout was cancelled after Joshua sustained a back injury. On 4 April 2015, Joshua beat Jason Gavern with a third-round KO in his return to the ring in Newcastle. On 9 May 2015, in his twelfth bout, Joshua defeated Raphael Zumbano Love in a second-round KO in Birmingham. On 30 May 2015, Joshua defeated former world title challenger Kevin Johnson (29–6–1, 14 KOs), inflicting the first stoppage in Johnson's career. After Johnson was saved by the bell in the first round the fight was stopped by the referee shortly after the beginning of the second round. Prior to the fight, Johnson had taken the likes of Vitali Klitschko, Tyson Fury and Derek Chisora the twelve-round distance. A day after the fight, Johnson announced his retirement, although he made a comeback in March 2017.

=== British and Commonwealth champion ===
==== Joshua vs. Cornish ====
On 16 July 2015, it was announced that Joshua would fight undefeated Scottish boxer Gary Cornish (21–0, 12 KOs) for the vacant Commonwealth heavyweight title at The O2 Arena, London, on 12 September. At the time of the fight, Cornish was the IBO Intercontinental champion. Joshua won the vacant title by stopping Cornish at just 90 seconds in the first round. Cornish was knocked down twice before the fight was officially stopped. In the post-fight, Joshua said, "Gary had a solid jab so I had to make sure I didn't take any of those shots. He was throwing a large jab and I tried to slip it. I managed to land the right hand and it was a perfect connection and he went down."

==== Joshua vs. Whyte ====
Immediately after Joshua stopped Cornish, Joshua's promoter, Eddie Hearn, confirmed Dillian Whyte would next put his undefeated record on the line against Joshua. Joshua met Whyte in a grudge match for the vacant British heavyweight title on 12 December 2015, whilst also defending his Commonwealth heavyweight title for the first time. The fight took place on Sky Box Office. The two had previously fought within the amateur rankings in 2009 where Whyte had won. After surviving the first scare of his career in the second round, Joshua won the fight after initially shaking Whyte with a right hook to the temple and eventually finishing with a devastating uppercut for the KO in the seventh round. It is said that Joshua earned £3 million for this fight alone, as a result of signing a new five-year deal with Matchroom which sees him take a share of the PPV revenue earned.

=== IBF heavyweight champion ===
==== Joshua vs. Martin ====
In February 2016, it was announced that Joshua would face IBF heavyweight champion Charles Martin (23–0–1, 21 KOs) on 9 April 2016 at the O2 Arena. Martin was making the first defence of the belt that he won after defeating Vyacheslav Glazkov for the vacant title in January 2016. Joshua set the pace in the first round and kept the southpaw Martin at bay before sending him to the canvas with a straight right hand in the second round. Martin got to his feet, only to be knocked down for a second time by a similar punch just moments later. This time Martin failed to beat the count after taking too long to get up, and the referee waved the fight off, with Joshua winning his first world title.

Martin was heavily criticized for his performance, and apparent lack of ambition to win the fight. Observers accused him of quitting early, feeling that he could have got up quicker and fought on. Martin later placed the blame on the pre-fight distractions, claiming that he was 'mentally not there'. At just 85 days, Martin's reign as IBF heavyweight champion was the second shortest in professional boxing history, with only Tony Tucker's 1987 reign being shorter.

==== Joshua vs. Breazeale ====
Promoter Eddie Hearn announced a three-man shortlist from the IBF's top 15 ranked boxers for Joshua's first defence of his title. This included former WBC heavyweight champion Bermane Stiverne (25–1–2, 21 KOs) and Eric Molina (25–3, 19 KOs), both of whom were recently beaten by American WBC champion Deontay Wilder, alongside unbeaten upcoming fighter Dominic Breazeale (17–0, 15 KOs). On 25 April, it was announced that Joshua's next fight will be against Dominic Breazeale on 25 June 2016 at the O2 Arena in London. Breazeale was ranked 13th by the IBF, below British pair Derek Chisora and David Haye. Breazeale became only the second boxer, after Dillian Whyte, to take Joshua past three rounds. After a dominant performance, Joshua successfully defended his IBF heavyweight title with a seventh-round knockout win. Breazeale was dropped heavily by a huge left hand. After the fight, Eddie Hearn said Joshua could next fight IBF mandatory challenger, Joseph Parker, around November. The fight averaged 289,000 viewers on Showtime in the afternoon. The card averaged 227,000 viewers.

A week after the fight was announced against Breazeale, Joshua announced a new multi-fight deal with US broadcaster Showtime. The fight screened live in the States by Showtime after they signed up as Joshua's exclusive US partner.

==== Joshua vs. Molina ====
It was announced in August that Joshua would be making a second defence of his IBF title at the Manchester Arena in Manchester, on 26 November. This would mark the first time since September 2014 that Joshua would be fighting in the city. Possible names put forward for the fight were top IBF contenders Kubrat Pulev and Joseph Parker. Former unified heavyweight champion Wladimir Klitschko became the front-runner after his scheduled rematch with Tyson Fury was cancelled a second time.

A deal could not be finalized for Joshua vs. Klitschko, due to the WBA delaying a decision to sanction the fight and Klitschko injuring himself, which put the fight off completely. Klitschko said he would be looking to fight Joshua in the first quarter of 2017. Bryant Jennings and David Price were the names being pushed forward to fight Joshua next, however it was announced Joshua would be fighting at the Manchester Arena, defending his world title against former world title challenger Eric Molina (25–3, 19 KOs), who was coming off a stoppage victory against Tomasz Adamek, although being behind on the official scorecards. The fight was televised in the US live on Showtime. After two one-sided rounds, which saw Molina hardly throw a punch, Joshua knocked Molina out in the third round. He was first dropped after a right hand to the jaw. Molina beat the count but was met with a flurry of punches, forcing referee Steve Gray to end the fight. According to Nielsen Media Research, the fight peaked at 390,000 on Showtime, with an average viewing of 368,000 viewers. On 22 May 2018, UK Anti-Doping issued Molina with a two-year ban from fighting in the UK, backdated from 28 October 2017 until 28 October 2019. Molina tested positive for dexamethasone, a corticosteroid, after his loss to Joshua. There was some controversy as Molina had fought twice after in 2017.

=== First reign as unified heavyweight champion ===
==== Joshua vs. Klitschko ====
On 2 November 2016, the WBA agreed to sanction a unification bout between Joshua and Klitschko for the vacant WBA (Super) title, previously held by Tyson Fury. The WBA agreement was, if Joshua retained his belt against Eric Molina, the fight would take place on 29 April 2017, at Wembley Stadium in London.

After Joshua knocked out Molina in the third round, the Joshua vs. Klitschko fight was officially announced by Hearn in the ring. WBA president Gilberto J. Mendoza confirmed that the winner will have to face mandatory challenger Luis Ortiz next, with deadlines due to be set after the unification fight. A day later the IBF announced the winner must fight their mandatory challenger Kubrat Pulev. Because of this clashing with the WBA enforcing their mandatory, it was believed that either Joshua or Klitschko would have to vacate a title. In January 2017, Eddie Hearn announced that over 80,000 tickets had been sold, a new box office record, overtaking Carl Froch vs. George Groves II. He put a request in for 5,000 more tickets to be made available. It was reported that Joshua would earn in the region of £15 million for the fight. At the weigh-in, Klitschko, 41 at the time of the fight, weighed in at 240 1/4 pounds (109.0 kg), the lightest he had weighed since 2009. Joshua, 27, came in heavier at 250 pounds (110 kg).

In front of a post-war record crowd of 90,000 in attendance, Joshua won by TKO in a high-drama war that saw both men giving their all. They fought a close and cautious first four rounds. In the fifth, Joshua came and threw a flurry of punches, forcing Klitschko to the canvas. An angry Klitschko rose up and took control for the remainder of the round, landing clean punches and scoring his own knockdown in round six. The next few rounds were again cautious, both men wary of each other, until a reinvigorated Joshua attacked Klitschko in round eleven, sending him to the canvas. Klitschko again rose but Joshua knocked him down for a second time in the round. When Klitschko rose back to his feet, Joshua threw a barrage of unanswered punches while Klitschko was against the ropes, prompting the referee to stop the fight.

At the time of stoppage, Joshua was ahead on two of the judges' scorecards at 96–93 and 95–93, while the third judge had Klitschko ahead with 95–93. CompuBox stats showed that Joshua landed 107 of his 355 punches thrown (30%), and Klitschko landed 94 of 256 (37%). Joshua called out Fury in the post fight interview, "Tyson Fury, where you at, baby? Come on – that's what they want to see. I just want to fight everyone. I'm really enjoying this right now." In the press conference after the fight, Joshua said he would have no issues with having another fight with Klitschko, "I don't mind fighting him again, if he wants the rematch. Big respect to Wladimir for challenging the young lions of the division. It's up to him, I don't mind. As long as Rob thinks it's good I'm good to go." Eddie Hearn said Joshua's next fight would likely take place at the end of the year, possibly at the Principality Stadium in Cardiff.

The fight averaged 659,000 viewers on Showtime in the United States. It was shown live and the fight began around 5 pm. ET and 2 pm. PT. Nielsen Media Research revealed the fight peaked at 687,000 viewers which was during rounds five and six. This was an increase from Joshua's previous Showtime numbers that aired live during the late afternoon. The delayed tape-replay on HBO was watched by an average 738,000 viewers and peaked at 890,000. In a press release, German TV channel RTL announced the fight was watched by an average 9.59 million viewers, peaking at 10.43 million viewers. This was higher than the 8.91 million that tuned in to watch Klitschko vs. Fury in 2015.

On 7 June 2017, the IBF granted Joshua an exemption for him to rematch Klitschko instead of fighting mandatory challenger Kubrat Pulev. At this point, it was not said that the rematch would take place. Klitschko said he needed time to review his situation before agreeing to a rematch. It was only weeks after the fight, when Eddie Hearn filed the paperwork to the IBF to request the exemption to the mandatory defence. IBF explained that the rematch must take place no later than 2 December 2017, and the winner must fight Pulev next with no exemptions. On 2 August, Joshua revealed he would need to start a three-month training camp on 22 August, if he was to fight on 11 November, therefore hoping a fight with Klitschko would be finalised by then. However, on 3 August 2017, soon after the IBF granted an exemption, Klitschko announced on his website and social media channels that he was retiring from the sport of boxing. Thus, ending the possibility of a Joshua vs. Klitschko rematch.

==== Joshua vs. Takam ====
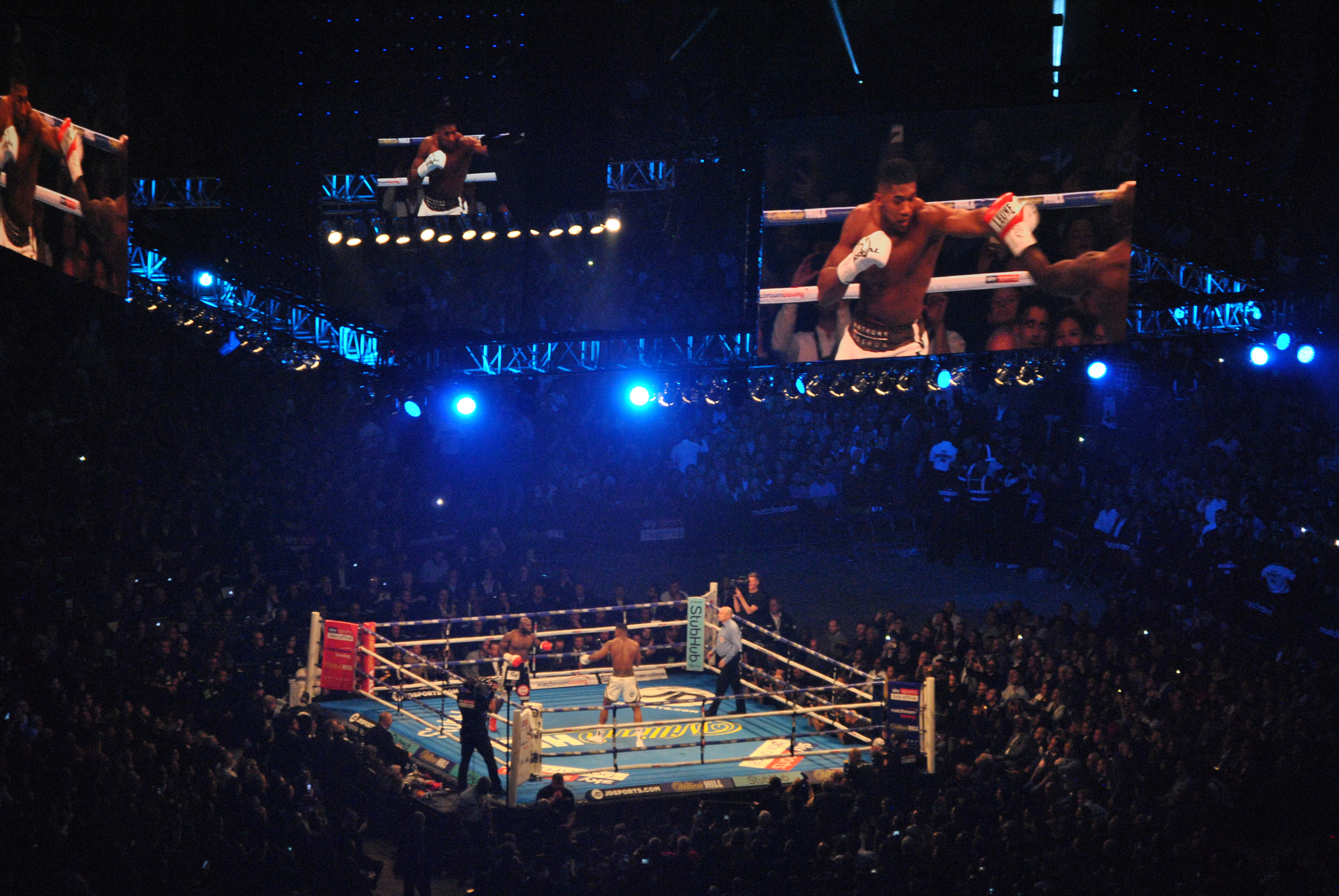
Joshua (in white trunks) vs. Takam at the Principality Stadium in Cardiff, 2017

On 3 August 2017, Klitschko announced on his website and social media channels that he was retiring from boxing. As a result, on 4 August, upon learning that Klitschko had retired, the IBF immediately ordered Joshua and 36-year-old Kubrat Pulev (25–1, 13 KOs) to fight next, with a deal needing to be reached by 3 September 2017. The WBA then ordered Joshua to make his mandatory defence against their top ranked fighter Luis Ortiz, giving them 30 days to reach a deal. According to Hearn, the plan was to fight Pulev next, followed by Ortiz and then a potential unification fight against Deontay Wilder. On 22 August, details between the camps of Joshua and Pulev were being discussed and close to being finalised for the date of 28 October 2017, with Las Vegas as the potential host.

On 28 August, it was announced that Joshua and Pulev would fight at the Principality Stadium in Cardiff. Promoter Eddie Hearn made the official announcement on 5 September, "I'm delighted that we will be in Cardiff at the magnificent Principality Stadium for the next step of the AJ journey. Nearly 80,000 will gather on Oct. 28 to create another unforgettable night of boxing. Anthony will meet his mandatory challenger, [IBF] No. 1-ranked Kubrat Pulev, and the card will be stacked with world championship action, domestic title fights and the very best young stars in the game. Get ready for the next episode from the biggest star in world boxing." The official press conference took place on 11 September, and the following day, a reported 70,000 tickets had been sold, making it the fastest selling event. It also set the record of largest boxing attendance to be expected indoors. The previous record was Muhammad Ali vs. Leon Spinks rematch which gathered 63,000 fans at the New Orleans Superdome in 1978. Joshua's three-fight deal with Showtime had expired, giving Eddie Hearn the chance to talk to other providers. Showtime had the right of first option and a matching right, if any providers bid higher. When HBO bid $1.6 million for the rights to show the fight, Showtime matched the bid, meaning the fight would be shown live in the afternoon on Showtime.

On 16 October, rumours circulated that Pulev had suffered an injury, which could see the fight being in jeopardy. The same reports suggested the injury was 10 days old, but Pulev's camp had kept it quiet. The injury was later revealed to be true and 36-year-old Carlos Takam (35–3–1, 27 KOs), who was ranked number 3 by the IBF, stepped in to replace Pulev on 12 days notice. Eddie Hearn said in a statement that he received a phone call from Pulev's promoter Kalle Sauerland advising him of a shoulder injury he had sustained during sparring. Hearn revealed when the Joshua vs. Pulev fight was made, he contacted Takam's camp, knowing they would be next in line and told them to begin a training camp and stay on standby. IBF stated that Joshua fighting Takam would satisfy his mandatory defence. Despite Hearn claiming Joshua would weigh around 235–240 pounds (107–109 kg), he officially weighed a career-heavy 254 pounds (115 kg), while Takam came in a 235 pounds (107 kg).

On fight night, in front of nearly 80,000 fans in attendance, Joshua retained his world titles with what many believed was a premature stoppage in round ten. The official time of stoppage was 1 minute, 34 seconds. Many fans ringside booed the referee stoppage, which saw Takam go out on his feet. After a cagey first round, the second round saw Takam accidentally headbutt Joshua's nose, likely breaking it, causing Joshua's eyes to water. In round four, Joshua opened up a cut above Takam's right eye. After the referee checked the eye, Joshua knocked Takam down with a left hook to the head. He beat the count and lasted the remainder of the round. Another cut appeared above Takam's left eye in round seven. Referee Phil Edwards asked the ringside doctor to take a look at Takam a few times during the fight. In rounds eight and nine, Joshua started to back off, which saw Takam come forward and land some good shots to Joshua's head. In round ten, Joshua landed a clean right uppercut followed by a barrage of punches. Referee Phil Edwards, seeing this, stepped in between, halting the fight. A doctor confirmed that Joshua's nose was not broken, only bruised and swollen.

It was revealed at the time of the stoppage, judges Pawel Kardyni and Michael Alexander had Joshua ahead 89–81, whilst judge Ron McNair had the fight 90–80 perfect for Joshua. In the post-fight interview, Joshua was asked about the stoppage, to which he replied, "It was a good fight until the ref stopped it, I have the utmost respect for Takam. I have no interest for what's going on with the officials. My job is the opponent. I don't have control over the ref's decision." Takam believed the fight was stopped too early, stating he would appreciate a rematch. Hearn and Joshua spoke about potential fights in 2018, which included fights with Joseph Parker and Deontay Wilder, where a win against both would see Joshua the undisputed champion and an all-English clash against Tyson Fury. CompuBox stats showed that Joshua landed 152 of 454 punches thrown (34%) and Takam was less busy connecting 52 of his 222 thrown (23%). The fight, which was shown live in the US on Showtime, averaged 334,000 viewers. A replay was shown later in the evening, which averaged 309,000 viewers.

==== Joshua vs. Parker ====
It was reported that Joseph Parker's team were looking at Lucas Browne as a potential match-up if they failed to land a unification fight with Joshua. According to Higgins, a date in March 2018 was being discussed with Joshua's team, however Eddie Hearn offered an 80–20 split, which would favour Joshua. Higgins spoke to Fairfax Media, saying the offer would need to be more reasonable, also taking into consideration the fight would take place in the UK. Other names discussed for a Summer 2018 fight included Bryant Jennings and Alexander Povetkin. According to a Tweet from Parker on 15 November, he was offered less than half of what was paid to Charles Martin when he defended his IBF title against Joshua. The next day, Higgins told Fairfax Media that he and Hearn were still negotiating a deal that would benefit all parties. Parker stated he was willing to drop to 35% of the net profit. Higgins made a final offer to Hearn on 22 November. He told Sky Sports, "It's our final bottom line decision. We feel anything less is disrespectful or a disgrace." On 29 November, Hearn stated the fight could be confirmed within two weeks. Higgins listed Camp Nou as the potential venue. According to Hearn on 11 December, a deal was very close to being announced with the Principality Stadium a frontrunner to host the fight. Hearn jokingly said they were over-paying Parker, with the deal being 65–35. On 28 December, Higgins announced that a split had been agreed which would see Parker earn between 30 and 35% of the purse and the fight should take place in April 2018. Higgins stated that a rematch clause would be in place for Joshua, should he lose. In a potential rematch, Parker would get a 55% split. On 8 January 2018, the Principality Stadium in Cardiff was confirmed as the venue for the fight. On 14 January, negotiations came to a close and the fight was officially announced to take place on 31 March in Cardiff, live on Sky Sports Box Office. In an official press release on 5 February, Showtime announced they would televise the fight live in the US. On 16 February, it was noted that Joshua was weighed around 247 pounds (112 kg), nearly 10 pounds (4.5 kg) lighter than he weighed against Takam. A picture was posted on Twitter which revealed the scales that Joshua stood on, his weight was at 112.9 kilograms. Joshua and Parker both came in lighter compared to their respective previous bouts. Parker weighed in first at 236.7 pounds (107.4 kg), his lightest since he fought Solomon Haumono in 2016. Joshua weighed 242.2 pounds (109.9 kg), his lightest since 2014 when he fought Michael Sprott. It was reported that Joshua would earn a career-high £18 million and Parker would also earn a career-high pay of £8 million.

Joshua was forced to go the distance for the first time in his 20–0 career, to defeat Parker, via twelve-round unanimous decision (UD) to claim Parker's WBO heavyweight title, as well as retain his WBA (Super), IBF and IBO titles. The judges scored the fight 118–110 twice, and 119–109 in favour of Joshua. Many media outlets including ESPN had the fight around 116–112 with Joshua the clear winner. With going the distance, Joshua's 20 fight knockout streak came to an end. Parker used his movement well to slip a lot of Joshua's attacks but in doing so did not do enough himself to win more rounds. Parker started on the backfoot in the opening rounds allowing Joshua to gain a foothold. There was an accidental clash of heads in round three, however neither boxer was cut from this. There was another accidental head-butt in round nine where the referee called for a short break. Joshua's tape on his left glove kept coming loose and he was ordered to go back to his corner for a re-tape. Parker suffered a cut over his left eye after Joshua accidentally elbowed him. In round twelve, neither boxer engaged as much as expected with Joshua trying to track Parker down, who again, on the back-foot, looked to survive the round. The fight was marred by Italian referee Giuseppe Quartarone, who kept both boxers from fighting on the inside. This mostly had a negative impact on Parker, where he was seen to have the most success. The referee was breaking the action each time both boxers were on the inside, even when they were still throwing shots. Many boxers, pundits and both the Sky Sports and Showtime broadcast teams criticised the referee during and after the fight.

After the fight, Joshua explained his game plan for the fight, "My strategy in there was kind of stick behind the jab. It's one of the most important weapons. The old saying is the right hand could take you around the block, but a good jab will take you around the world. And that secured another championship belt. So I stuck behind the jab and I made sure anything that was coming back, I was switched on, I was focused and 12 rounds, baby! I thought it was hard, right?" Parker was humble in defeat and stated he would be back even stronger, "Today I got beaten by a better champion, bigger man. A lot to work on. It was a good experience being here. Thank you all for the opportunity to fight in this big stadium. We're gonna go back, train hard, plan again and come back stronger. No regrets, you know, take it on the chin. ... So we'll be back again." When asked what he would do different, Parker replied, "Work harder. Come back stronger, more punches. But I would love to have another go. Just back to the drawing board." During the post fight press conference, Parker's team stated the referee did not speak English, whereas Joshua and his promoter Hearn disagreed and said he spoke English fluently. CompuBox punch stats showed that Joshua landed 139 of 383 punches thrown (36.3%) and Parker landed 101 of his 492 thrown (20.5%).

The fight was shown live in the US on Showtime in the afternoon. The live showing averaged 346,000 viewers and peaked at 379,000 viewers. A replay was shown later in the evening which saw an increase. The replay averaged 430,000 viewers and peaked at 483,000 viewers. Nielsen Media Research, who released the figures do not have the facility to measure whether the same customers that watched the live showing tuned in for the replay.

==== Joshua vs. Povetkin ====
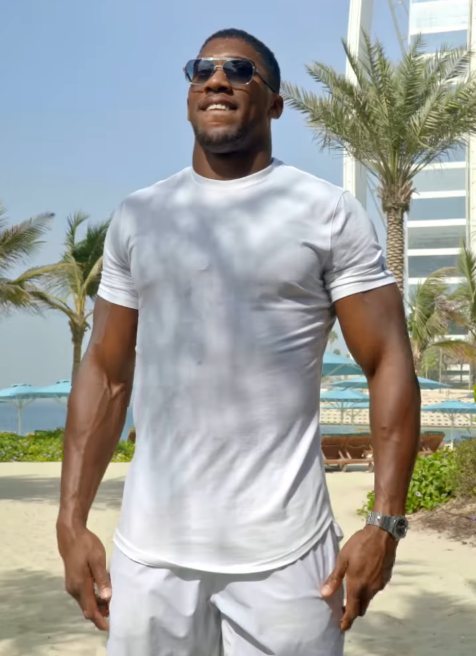
Joshua in Dubai, 2017

From April up until the end of June 2018, both camps of Joshua and Wilder were in talks around the super fight between the two to finally take place. The main hurdles were the purse split, date and venue. At one point Wilder had agreed to fight Joshua in the UK, however there was slight confusions in the contracts that were being sent back and forth. At the same time, Hearn was also working out a deal for Joshua to fight WBA mandatory challenger Alexander Povetkin (34–1, 24 KOs). The WBA initially ordered the fight after Povetkin knocked out David Price on the Joshua-Parker undercard. Negotiations took a turn on 26 June when the WBA gave Joshua's camp 24 hours to finalise a deal with Povetkin. With Joshua closer to fighting Povetkin in September 2018, Hearn stated the Joshua-Wilder fight would still take place in April 2019 at Wembley Stadium. Hearn later explained that the WBA would have granted an exemption, had Wilder signed a deal to fight Joshua.

On 5 July, Hearn announced that Wembley Stadium in London would host Joshua's next two fights on 22 September 2018 and again on 13 April 2019. On 16 July, Joshua vs. Povetkin for the WBA (Super), IBF, WBO, and IBO heavyweight titles was officially announced for 22 September on Sky Box Office. Many British pundits and trainers spoke of how Joshua should not underestimate Povetkin and how he would pose a big threat to Joshua. On 27 July, Joshua signed a new three-year deal with Matchroom Boxing, which would see him showcased on Sky Box Office for at least another five fights, including the bout with Povetkin. On 1 August, it was revealed by the WBO that the bout against Povetkin would satisfy Joshua's mandatory defences for both the WBA and WBO, since Povetkin was ranked as number 1 by both governing bodies. It was also announced that Joshua would be named the WBO's Super Champion should he defeat Povetkin.

In front of nearly 80,000 in attendance, Joshua overcame an initial struggle, eventually knocking out Povetkin in round seven to retain his world titles. Using his movement and coming in and out, Povetkin had Joshua hurt early on with his big shots. In round two, Joshua's nose began to bruise. From round five, Povetkin began to tire. Joshua dropped Povetkin with a left hand to the head in round seven. Povetkin got back up but Joshua was straight back in with a flurry of hard shots, prompting the referee to stop the fight. At the time of stoppage, the three judges scorecards were 58–56 twice, and 59–55 in favour of Joshua.

In the post-fight interview, Joshua stated, "I've got my knockout streak back and I found my right hand again. Alexander Povetkin is a very tough challenge. He provided that, he was good with left hook. I realized he was strong to the head but weak to the body so I was switching it up. Every jab takes a breath out of you and I slowed him down." He then stated he would post a poll on Twitter asking the fans who they would like to see him fight next. CompuBox stats showed that Joshua landed 90 of 256 punches thrown (35%), with 53 of them landed being jabs. Povetkin landed 47 of his 181 thrown (26%). Povekin connected with 43 power shots compared to Joshua 37 landed. There was also a huge size advantage in favour of Joshua, who weighed 246 pounds (112 kg) to Povetkin's 222 pounds (101 kg). It was reported that Joshua would earn around £20 million and Povetkin would earn around £6 million for the fight.

==== Joshua vs. Ruiz Jr. ====
On 29 December 2018, with Joshua's Wembley date still on hold, Hearn stated that Dillian Whyte was the frontrunner to challenge Joshua. Whilst still waiting for Hearn to contact him, Whyte claimed to hear rumours that Joshua would drop the Wembley date and instead fight American contender Jarrell Miller at Madison Square Garden. On 12 January 2019, Whyte revealed that he had turned down a 'severe lowball' offer from Joshua to fight him in a rematch. Whyte did not reveal the figure, however claimed it was lower than what he received against Chisora in December 2018. By 21 January, Hearn stated there could be a possibility Joshua may well fight in the US instead. According to Hearn, it was Joshua who was making the offer for the Whyte fight. Whyte claimed Joshua did not want to fight him, as he had known since September 2018, that he would be fighting in April 2019, yet did not make any offers. On 1 February, Hearn admitted it was becoming highly unlikely that Joshua would still fight at Wembley Stadium on 13 April. On 2 February, Whyte claimed the Joshua fight 'was dead' and he was to look at other options, including a potential fight with Dominic Breazeale. According to Miller, Joshua initially offered Whyte $3 million, then increased the offer to $5 million, only to go down to $3.5 million.

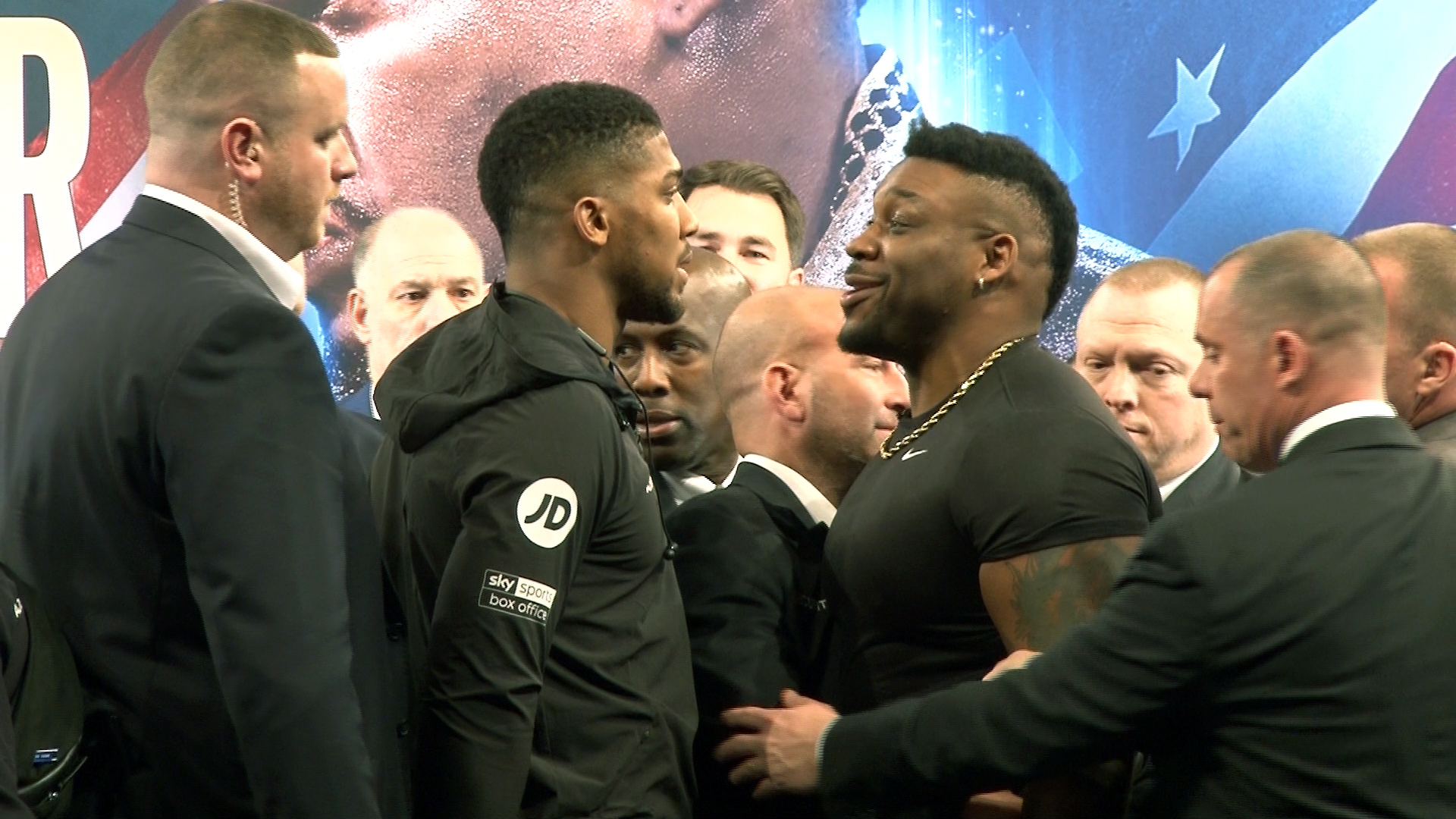
Joshua faces Jarrell "Big Baby" Miller at their Madison Square Garden press conference in 2019.

On 8 February, terms were agreed for Joshua to defend his unified heavyweight titles against Jarrell Miller (23–0–1, 20 KOs) on 1 June at Madison Square Garden in New York City, marking Joshua's US debut. The event became the highest grossing pre-sale in the arena's boxing history. The launch presser began to heat up right from the start after Miller shoved Joshua during their first face off. It eventually settled down and both parties took to their seats. From there on, it was a back and forth verbal exchange, before Miller stormed off the stage. Joshua stayed and answered any remaining questions from the media. It was reported that Joshua would pocket £19.3 million (equivalent to $25 million) for his US debut. Another report claimed Joshua was to earn an estimated $32 million. Miller's deal with DAZN ensured he received a career-high purse of $4.875 million, which would include two more bouts on DAZN worth $3 million.

On 17 April 2019, both camps confirmed the Voluntary Anti-Doping Association had informed them that Miller had tested positive for the banned substance GW1516. The test results were from a random VADA-conducted urine test Miller submitted to on 20 March. Further tests taken on 31 March proved positive for EPO, HGH and GW1516 again. Many boxers, including Ivan Dychko and Manuel Charr put their names forward to fight Joshua instead. Hearn reportedly spoke to 16 heavyweights in the space of 24 hours. Luis Ortiz was the first name that Joshua wanted as a replacement. Hearn was adamant that Joshua would still fight on that date as 17,000 tickets had already been sold, with 10,000 of those being from Britain.

Prior to his fight with Alexander Dimitrenko, on 20 April, former world title challenger Andy Ruiz Jr. (31–1, 20 KOs) put his name forward to replace Miller and challenge Joshua for the unified heavyweight titles on 1 June 2019. On 22 April, Ruiz confirmed his team had a meeting scheduled with promoter Eddie Hearn, officially putting himself in the running. Ruiz became a frontrunner after it was reported Luis Ortiz' team had rejected two offers of career high purses to fight Joshua. Terms were agreed within a week. On 1 May, with one month to go before fight night, Joshua vs. Ruiz was confirmed and announced to take place at Madison Square Garden in New York City exclusively on DAZN in the US. It was reported that Ruiz would earn around $7 million (£5.36m) for the bout. Joshua dropped Ruiz in the third round, for the first time in the challenger's career. Ruiz beat the count, and scored his own knock down moments later. Joshua was down again towards the end of the round in a massive turn around. Joshua managed to survive the next few rounds, but after a further two knock-downs in the seventh round, the referee waved the fight off, therefore giving Ruiz the win by TKO in the seventh round, gaining all of Joshua's four heavyweight titles. At the time of stoppage, Ruiz was leading the fight 57–56 on two scorecards and Joshua was leading 57–56 on the other. It is considered to be one of the biggest upsets in the history of boxing, rivalling Mike Tyson vs. Buster Douglas.

=== Second reign as unified heavyweight champion ===
==== Joshua vs. Ruiz Jr. II ====
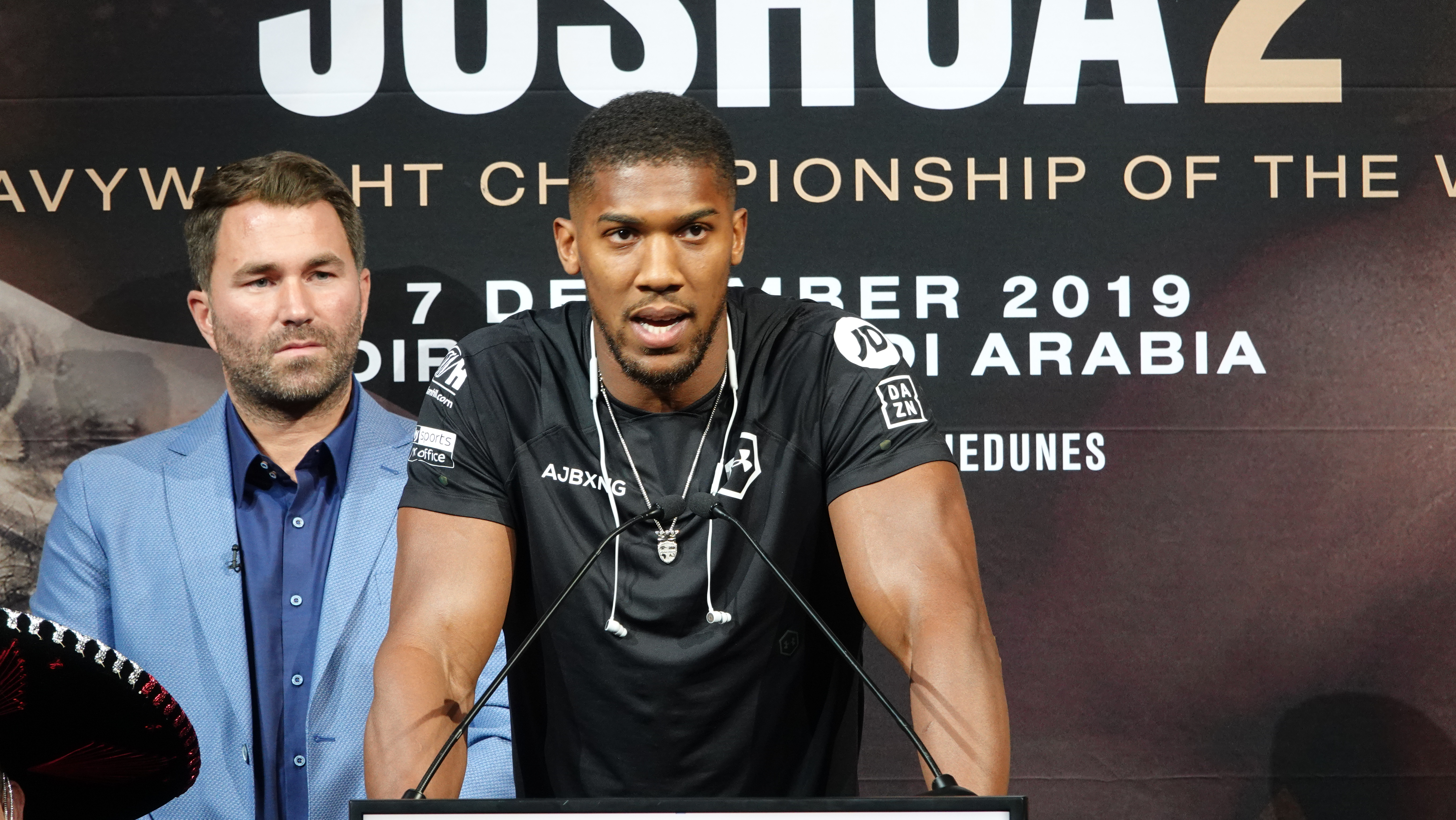
Joshua speaks at the press conference announcing his rematch with Andy Ruiz Jr.

A rematch took place on 7 December 2019 at the purpose built Diriyah Arena in Diriyah, Saudi Arabia. At the weigh-in, Joshua came in at 237 pounds (108 kg), nearly 10 pounds (4.5 kg) lighter than in the pair's first match. By contrast, Ruiz weighed in at 284 pounds (129 kg), 16 pounds (7.3 kg) heavier than before. On the night, Joshua boxed a disciplined fight, keeping Ruiz at a distance with his jab and using lateral movement to avoid trading punches up close as he had in their first encounter. He started off well, landing a sharp right hand in the first round that cut Ruiz to the side of his left eye. Joshua continued to box economically and land the more meaningful punches. Ruiz had some success when he tagged Joshua to the head and body at the end of the fourth round, but Joshua remained firmly in control of the action. He won via unanimous decision to reclaim the unified heavyweight titles with scores of 118–110 on two judges' scorecards and 119–109 on the other's. In his post-fight interview, a jubilant Joshua declared, "Man, the first time was so nice, I had to do it twice... Stay hungry, stay humble. I'm humble in defeat and will stay humble in victory." Ruiz showed his opponent respect, saying "Anthony Joshua did a hell of a job."

==== Joshua vs. Pulev ====
Joshua had been initially announced to fight Kubrat Pulev in 2017, but a late injury to Pulev saw Carlos Takam replace him for the fight. On 2 March 2020 it was announced that Joshua would defend his heavyweight titles against Pulev (28–1, 14 KOs), who was IBF mandatory challenger, at London's Tottenham Hotspur Stadium on 20 June. However, due to the COVID-19 pandemic, the fight was postponed indefinitely on 3 April 2020. The fight was re-announced with a new date of 12 December and a new venue of The O2 Arena in London. The fight was later moved again to Wembley Arena, and it was announced that up to 1,000 fans would be able to attend due to the recent relaxation of coronavirus restrictions. On the night, Joshua dropped his opponent twice in the third round, and ultimately defeated Pulev by ninth-round knockout to retain his unified heavyweight titles. Former five-division champion Floyd Mayweather Jr. had been in attendance; Joshua paid tribute to him after the fight, saying "It was an honour to have him in the house. I respect him highly for what he has achieved. He came to see me perform and I pulled off one of his favourite moves - the pull-counter." Mayweather reciprocated the praise, saying "I'm proud of Joshua. He is one of the best heavyweights out there. He won [an Olympic] gold medal, his career is going great, a two-time heavyweight champion. He is a hell of a fighter. He is a gentleman and I enjoy his craft."

==== Joshua vs. Usyk ====
Immediately after defeating IBF mandatory challenger Kubrat Pulev on 12 December 2020 in London, Joshua was asked in the post-fight interview about the prospect of an undisputed fight with undefeated WBC and The Ring champion Tyson Fury, to which Joshua responded, "Whoever's got the belt, I'd love to compete with him. If that is Tyson Fury, let it be Tyson Fury." A two-fight deal between the two champions had been agreed "in principle" since June 2020. On 17 May 2021, Fury announced on his social media that the fight between him and Joshua would take place on 14 August 2021 in Saudi Arabia. However, within 24 hours of the announcement, arbitration judge Daniel Weinstein ruled that former WBC champion Deontay Wilder was entitled to exercise his option for a third fight with Fury on a date up to 15 September; this put the proposed bout between Fury and Joshua in jeopardy, as Wilder indicated that he was not prepared to stand aside to allow the British boxers to proceed. As a result of these developments, on 21 May the WBO gave Joshua's camp 48 hours to come to an agreement for the fight with Fury, or they would instead order a bout against their mandatory challenger, former undisputed cruiserweight champion Oleksandr Usyk. Fury and Joshua's camps could not reach an agreement, and thus on 22 May the WBO issued the instruction that Joshua would have to fight Usyk, with an agreement for the bout to be in place by 31 May. On 20 July, an official announcement was made, confirming that the fight between Joshua and Usyk would be taking place on 25 September at Tottenham Hotspur Stadium. On the night, Usyk produced an upset, outboxing the champion Joshua over 12 rounds to claim a unanimous decision victory, with scores of 117–112, 116–112 and 115–113, handing Joshua the second professional loss of his career. Usyk's movement and variety in his fighting proved to be too much for Joshua, as Usyk nearly stopped the champion in the final seconds of the last round.

=== Post-title career ===
==== Joshua vs. Usyk II ====
On 29 September 2021, four days after Oleksandr Usyk defeated Joshua to become unified world heavyweight champion, it was announced by his promoter Alexander Krassyuk that a one-sided rematch clause which had been specified in the fight contract had "already been activated in principle, from the side of Joshua." Krassyuk noted that Usyk relished the prospect of squaring off against Joshua twice: "So I remember when we discussed with Oleksandr the issue of rematch, he was delighted and said 'Wow, cool, I will beat Antokha [sic] twice.'" Regarding the venue of the rematch, Usyk made it known that he hoped it would take place in his native country of Ukraine, saying, "I would love to have the rematch at Olimpiyskiy Stadium in Kyiv." However, Joshua's promoter, Eddie Hearn, stated that Ukraine was a "very unlikely" venue, as he wanted to maximise income: "I think it will be international or the UK, I would think it would be in the UK." On 19 June 2022, it was officially announced that Usyk would be facing Joshua in a rematch in Jeddah, Saudi Arabia on 20 August. The fight would mark the first defence of Usyk's world heavyweight titles, while it was Joshua's twelfth consecutive world heavyweight title fight as he attempted to become a three-time world heavyweight champion.

Despite Joshua's improved performance compared to his first loss to Usyk, the latter successfully defended his belts by a split decision with one judge scoring the fight 115–113 to Joshua, while the other two judges scoring it 115–113 and 116–112 in Usyk's favour. According to New York Times statistics, Joshua landed 37 body punches compared to 15 in their first fight. Overall, however, Usyk outperformed Joshua, landing 170 of 712 punches, compared with 124 of 492 for Joshua. According to CompuBox, Usyk established new records for punches landed by an Anthony Joshua opponent (170) and most punches landed on Joshua in a single round (39 punches in the 10th round). After the announcement of the judges' scorecards, Joshua threw two of Usyk's belts out of the ring and started to walk out of the arena, but came back and once in control of the microphone gave an emotional speech, talking about his life, fighting, Ukraine, and praising Usyk. Onlookers were surprised and didn't seem to know how to act when Anthony gave his unusual speech. In the speech Anthony Joshua spoke about how hard he had had life and wasn't given the opportunities in the amateurs as Usyk was. He spoke about how people criticised him and asked why he didn't throw combinations like a much smaller Rocky Marciano. Shortly after, Joshua was recorded backstage responding to a bystander who had criticised him, yelling: "Who are you talking to? Who are you talking to? Shut your fucking mouth." In the post-fight press conference, Joshua broke down in tears.

==== Joshua vs. Franklin ====
On 6 February 2023, it was officially announced that Joshua would be returning to the ring on 1 April at The O2 Arena against Jermaine Franklin. The fight would mark the first fight as part of his exclusive five-year deal with sports streaming service DAZN. In the first pre-fight press conference on 9 February, Joshua announced his new partnership with American trainer Derrick James, as well as being questioned by his promoter Eddie Hearn on his motivation for fighting. Joshua answered by repeatedly stating, "Money, money, money", before Hearn had finished asking the question, before further elaborating: "I like making money. Straight up. Like, this is a prizefighting sport."

Joshua weighed in at a career-heaviest 255 1/4 pounds (115.8 kg), while Franklin weighed in at 234 3/4 pounds (106.5 kg), over 22 pounds (10.0 kg) lighter than his previous fight against Dillian Whyte. On the night, Joshua had a tentative performance, initiating constant clinches. Despite a particularly cautious start to the fight, he made use of his jab to set up power punches with his right hand, prevailing via unanimous decision, with judges' scorecards of 117–111 (twice) and 118–111 in his favour. After the final bell, the two men engaged in a light scuffle in the ring, coming close to brawling. The altercation was initiated by Joshua, who had tapped Franklin in the back of his head while Franklin had turned his back to walk away. In his post-fight interview, Joshua expressed his desire to face undefeated WBC champion Tyson Fury next, saying, "I would be 100 percent honoured to compete for the WBC championship of the world."

==== Joshua vs. Helenius ====
On 6 July 2023 Dillian Whyte vs. Anthony Joshua II, a rematch of the 12 December 2015 bout. was announced to be held at The O2 Arena in London. This was cancelled on 5 August 2023, after Whyte returned a positive drug test conducted by the voluntary anti-doping agency. On 8 August 2023, Robert Helenius was announced as the replacement for Whyte, with the bout taking place on the originally scheduled date of 12 August 2023. Joshua won the bout by knockout due to a right hook in round 7.

==== Joshua vs. Wallin ====
In October 2023, reports stated that Joshua could potentially face Deontay Wilder on 23 December on the same card alongside Tyson Fury and Oleksandr Usyk in Saudi Arabia. On 11 November however, reports then stated that Joshua and Wilder would both be fighting on 23 December but against different opponents. On 15 November, it was announced that Joshua would face Otto Wallin on 23 December while Wilder would face Joseph Parker as the co-feature bout. Joshua defeated Wallin by RTD after Wallin's corner decided not to let the fighter continue after round 5.

==== Joshua vs. Ngannou ====
Joshua faced former UFC Heavyweight Champion and newly ranked #10 in the WBC Francis Ngannou in Saudi Arabia on 8 March 2024. He knocked down Ngannou in the first round, and won by second-round knockout.

==== Joshua vs. Dubois ====
On 26 June 2024, IBF interim heavyweight champion Daniel Dubois was elevated to full IBF champion after the title was vacated by former opponent, Oleksandr Usyk. On the same day, it was announced that Joshua would be challenging Dubois for the title on 21 September 2024 at Wembley Stadium in London, in what would be Joshua's thirteenth world title fight.

The fighters weighed in the day before their fight in front of Nelson's Column at Trafalgar Square, in London. Joshua weighed in at 252.5 pounds (114.5 kg), almost 4 pounds (1.8 kg) heavier than Dubois' weight of 248.6 pounds (112.8 kg). This was marginally heavier for Joshua compared to his fight against Francis Ngannou 6 months previously, while Dubois' weight was a new career-heaviest for him, 3 pounds (1.4 kg) heavier than his previous record.

Dubois, despite being the reigning IBF champion, walked to the ring first "very composed, almost seemingly too relaxed" whilst Joshua entered the ring second and "seemed tight during his ring walk", according to Joseph Santoliquito of The Ring. Joshua lost the fight by knockout in the fifth round, being dropped in the first, third, fourth and fifth rounds. The result was considered a major upset, as Dubois was the pre-betting underdog going into fight. Dubois immediately started boxing aggressively, and knocked Joshua to the canvas at the end of the first round with a huge overhand right to Joshua's chin. Joshua was able to beat the count, but seemed to be on unsteady legs as the bell signalled the end of the first round. Momentum seemed to be in Dubois' favour, and he knocked Joshua down for the second time in round 3 with a left to the chin: Joshua's gloves had touched the canvas, but the referee allowed Dubois to continue unloading punches which eventually did trigger an official knockdown. The fourth round saw Joshua hit the canvas twice more, although one of those occasions was ruled a slip. In the fifth round, Joshua seemed to find a way back into the fight when he landed a right hand which seemed to force Dubois back into a corner. However, Dubois caught Joshua on the chin with a counter right hand as Joshua was attempting to land a right uppercut of his own, which sent Joshua sprawling to the canvas again, and this time unable to beat the count. The fight was called off after 59 seconds of the fifth round, with Dubois retaining his IBF heavyweight title via fifth round knockout. Over the five rounds, Dubois landed 79 of his 196 punches thrown with a connect rate of 40% and Joshua landed only 32 of his 117 punches thrown with a connect rate of 27%.

==== Joshua vs. Paul ====
In July 2025, Eddie Hearn discussed a possible fight between Joshua and Jake Paul, noting the increasing interest following Paul's earlier call-out to Joshua. He mentioned that conversations were ongoing with Turki Al-Sheikh. He said, "You know, obviously it'll be up to AJ and myself what AJ does, and [Most Valuable Promotions CEO] Nakisa [Bidarian] and Jake, what they do – but also the power of Turki Alalshikh bringing it together, making it a mega-event. We're up for it. You know, it's not a fight we targeted. It's not a fight we anticipated. But as I said, if it's there and it's open and it's a running-up fight before Tyson Fury, why not?"

On 8 August, it was announced that Joshua would return to the ring in December 2025. One potential opponent was French Olympic gold medallist Tony Yoka (14–3, 11 KOs). French promoter Yohan Zaoui was confident that Joshua would fight Yoka next, but according to Hearn, Paul was the "front-runner" for Joshua's next fight. On 20 August, Paul announced an exhibition fight against lightweight boxer Gervonta Davis to take place in November 2025. Two weeks prior to their fight, Davis was mentioned in a civil lawsuit that accused him of violent behaviour, battery, and kidnapping. On 4 November, Most Valuable Promotions and Netflix announced the cancellation of the card.

On November 12, The Ring reported that both Joshua and Paul were finalizing a deal to fight in December in Miami, to be streamed on Netflix. Negotiations were challenging due to Joshua being tied to DAZN and Paul wanting to use Netflix. Following the cancellation of the Davis fight, Paul began recruiting heavyweight sparring partners to prepare for his next fight.

On 17 November 2025, Most Valuable Promotions announced that Paul was scheduled to fight Joshua on 19 December at the Kaseya Center in Miami, Florida, in an eight-round sanctioned match with 10oz gloves, to be broadcast by Netflix. Joshua told Forbes that he accepted the bout because it presented a major opportunity for global attention and high viewership, saying he intended to "do massive numbers" and "break the internet" with the event. The fight represented a significant challenge for Paul, who had previously competed primarily as a cruiserweight and had considerably less professional experience than Joshua, who is known for his extensive boxing background and power. The fight marked Joshua's first in the United States since his defeat by Andy Ruiz Jr. in 2019. During fight week, DraftKings listed Joshua as a 12–1 favourite. Joshua wanted to achieve a decisive victory similar to his second-round knockout of Francis Ngannou in March 2024, stating it was not personal. It was the first time Joshua had to make weight (245 pounds [111 kg]) in his professional career. He weighed in at 243.4 pounds (110.4 kg), his lightest since 2021, where he weighed 240 pounds (110 kg). Paul weighed in at 216.6 pounds (98.2 kg). After weighing in, Joshua joked, "I can't wait to eat."

Joshua dropped Paul four times, defeated him via sixth-round knockout, after challenging early rounds. In the opening rounds, Paul used a defensive strategy, moving away from Joshua to avoid any engagement. This helped prolong the fight. The ending came in the sixth round, when Joshua landed a straight right followed with a right-left combination, knocking Paul down for the time at 1 minute 31 seconds. Paul attempted to get up but the referee counted him out as he reached his feet. All three judges had the same 50–43 scorecard, in favour of Joshua.

In his post-fight interview, Joshua admitted, "it wasn't the best performance", before calling out his long-time British rival, former two-time heavyweight champion Tyson Fury, saying "if Tyson Fury is as serious as he thinks he is, and he wants to put down his Twitter fingers and put on some gloves and come and fight one of the realest fighters out there that will take on any challenge, step into the ring with me next if you're a real bad boy." According to CompuBox, Joshua landed 48 of 146 punches (33%), while Paul landed with just 16 of his 56 shots (29%). The fight received significant viewership success for Netflix, attracting 33 million viewers globally.

==== Joshua vs. Prenga ====
On 19 February 2026, Joshua began planning his return to the ring for the summer. The original plan was for Joshua to fight in Riyadh in March and have a subsequent bout with Tyson Fury in August; however, these plans were delayed due to the car accident in December. Some sources linked Joshua to a fight against old rival Dillian Whyte. Fury had a return fight against Arslanbek Makhmudov in April. Hearn stated a fight with Fury would likely take place in November 2026. By March, Joshua resumed full training. Matchroom CEO Frank Smith confirmed the Whyte rematch rumours were not accurate and not in their plans. According to Hearn, Joshua was working out a 2-fight deal directly with Turki Al-Sheikh, for a return fight in July and then a fight with Fury in November. Hearn stated that Joshua was looking at an opponent of a calibre similar to Makhmudov. On 27 April, it was announced that Joshua would fight little-known Albanian heavyweight Kristian Prenga (20–1, 20 KOs) on 25 July in Riyadh, with the event being streamed exclusively on DAZN, coinciding with the third annual Esports World Cup tournament. Despite his impressive knockout ratio, Prenga was unproven at the world-class level and had not completed a 12-round fight. At the same time, Al-Sheikh announced the fight between Fury and Joshua, later in the year, on Netflix. On the announcement, Joshua said, Joshua said: "It's no secret I've taken some time to consolidate and rebuild to be ready for stepping back into the ring and today is the next step on that journey. I'm delighted to have agreed a multi-fight deal starting with July 25th in the kingdom of Saudi Arabia. I'm looking forward to competing and picking up where I left off. As I said. The landlord will collect his rent. That is certain." Prenga was listed as a 19/1 underdog heading into the fight. Joshua weighed 251 pounds while Prenga came in heavier at 261.4 pounds. On the night, Prenga started fast and knocked down Joshua twice in the opening round, before Joshua recovered to knock Prenga out in the second round.

The bout was highly controversial with many viewers and pundits questioning its authenticity, owing to Prenga's hesitant and lethargic approach in the second round given the success he had in the first. Former 2-division world champion Paulie Malignaggi explored his own thoughts regarding the fight potentially being fixed on TalkSport stating that "A lot of powerful people make a lot of money if you make AJ vs Fury. So, is it possible that somebody whispered into the Prenga corner? I'm just giving a conspiracy theory, don't shoot the messenger." going on to say "I'm not saying it's necessarily what I believe. Okay. I mean, it's certainly in my mind. It's certainly something I'm thinking about because I'm still trying to come to terms with a guy who was throwing a bunch of punches and landed them and hurt his opponent and all of a sudden just decided to hit the pause button and say, "You know what? I'm not going to throw any punches in round two. You know, I don't want to win this fight." I don't know. It was weird".

==== Joshua vs. Fury ====
A match between Joshua and Tyson Fury has been discussed since 2016, including potential bouts when both men held world titles, with negotiations failing for reasons including mandatory challengers and rematches. An undisputed title fight was considered in 2021, but Deontay Wilder exercised a rematch clause against Fury, leading to a trilogy between Fury and Wilder. Joshua went on to lose his unified world titles to Usyk, and Fury lost his WBC title to Usyk in 2024.

On 12 December 2025, Ring magazine announced the fight would take place in 2026 under Riyadh Season, after both Fury and Joshua take warm-up fights. Frank Warren told Sky Sports News: "There's been some talks going on, there's nothing been signed yet, but Tyson's indicated if it's the right deal, he'll definitely do it." After stopping Jake Paul, Joshua said, "If Tyson Fury is serious, step in the ring with me next ... Don't do all that talking, let's fight." Joshua was then involved in a fatal car crash on 29 December in Nigeria, where two of his close friends died, and Joshua suffering minor injuries, putting doubts on the future of his career.

On 11 April, Fury defeated Makhmudov via decision in London and during the post-fight, was joined in the ring by his promoter Frank Warren and Turki Al-Sheikh. Joshua was sat ringside along with Hearn and refused to enter the ring. Fury then signalled his intent to face Joshua in a "Battle of Britain" heavyweight showdown. Despite contracts not being signed, the idea was to announce the fight in the ring, with Fury inviting Joshua to "dance" after a decade of anticipation. After the event, Joshua spoke to Anna Woolhouse, telling her, "I'm going to be completely honest. There's a negotiation to go through. I've sat at this table many times, not here to chase clout. Contracts will be sent over and I'll more than likely be in the ring with him next." Fury insisted his side of the contracts were already signed and was only waiting on Joshua. During his post-fight press conference, Fury threatened retirement again if he did not get a fight with Joshua next, claiming he had only come out of retirement for the Joshua fight. As with many big fights involving Al-Sheikh, it was believed that both Fury and Joshua would sign their own contracts through him to make the fight happen. According to Warren, Fury had signed his contract. On 15 April, Hearn confirmed that a match between Fury and Joshua would not take place at Croke Park in Dublin. This was despite speculation following remarks from Croke Park's chief executive, Peter McKenna, about a potential event featuring Fury alongside Katie Taylor's farewell fight. Hearn wanted Taylor to be the sole focus of her farewell fight. Hearn confirmed the match would be promoted by Saudi company Sela.

On 27 April, Al-Sheikh announced the fight between Fury and Joshua would take place later in 2026 on Netflix. Fury also decided to take a 'warm-up' fight, to tale place on 1 August in Dublin. In June, Hearn criticised Fury’s plan to take an extra tune‑up fight before a proposed bout with Joshua, stating that “more rounds ain’t going to help you.” Hearn argued that Fury’s performance in his victory over Makhmudov showed vulnerabilities that Joshua could exploit. There was much public dispute over who was actually promoting the fight and where the event would be taking place. Dana White of Zuffa Boxing claimed involvement in negotiating the event and questioned the role of established promoters, while Hearn stated that the existing contract specified the United Kingdom as the host country and that no official confirmation had been made regarding the location. There were reports that venues in the United States were also being considered, prior to this. In July, Al-Sheikh stated that Wembley Stadium was his preferred venue for the bout, but said the location had not yet been finalised. He explained that staging the fight in England depended on whether Wembley could allow a later start time to suit international broadcasters, particularly the US. Wembley normally adhered to a 10:30pm curfew, sometimes extended to 11pm, but Al-Sheikh said the fight would need to take place later at night to suit the global audience. In August 2026, WBC president Mauricio Sulaiman stated that the bout would be approved as a final eliminator for the WBC championship. Sulaiman argued that the fight was justified by the organisation's rankings, with Fury as the No. 1 contender and Joshua ranked fifth at the time. He said the WBC would be "proud to be part of that promotion" and praised Fury as "one of the greatest ambassadors ever of the WBC". He also noted Joshua's long association with the organisation and suggested that "maybe this will be the time to bring Anthony Joshua to the WBC".

On 24 September 2026, it was announced Fury and Joshua would face off on 11 December at Principality Stadium in Cardiff, Wales, and that the WBA (Super) heavyweight title would be on the line, meaning that the winner of the fight would become a three-time world heavyweight champion. Some residents of Cardiff objected to plans for the fight to be staged in the early hours of the morning. Organisers applied for a licence extension that would allow the event to continue until 3 a.m., with ring walks proposed for approximately 1 a.m. to accommodate a global broadcast schedule. Opponents of the application argued that the event would cause excessive noise, disruption, and anti-social behaviour, while supporters promoted it for its potential economic benefits. A decision on the licence extension was scheduled to be made by Cardiff Council's Licensing Sub-Committee on 25 November 2026.

== Public image ==
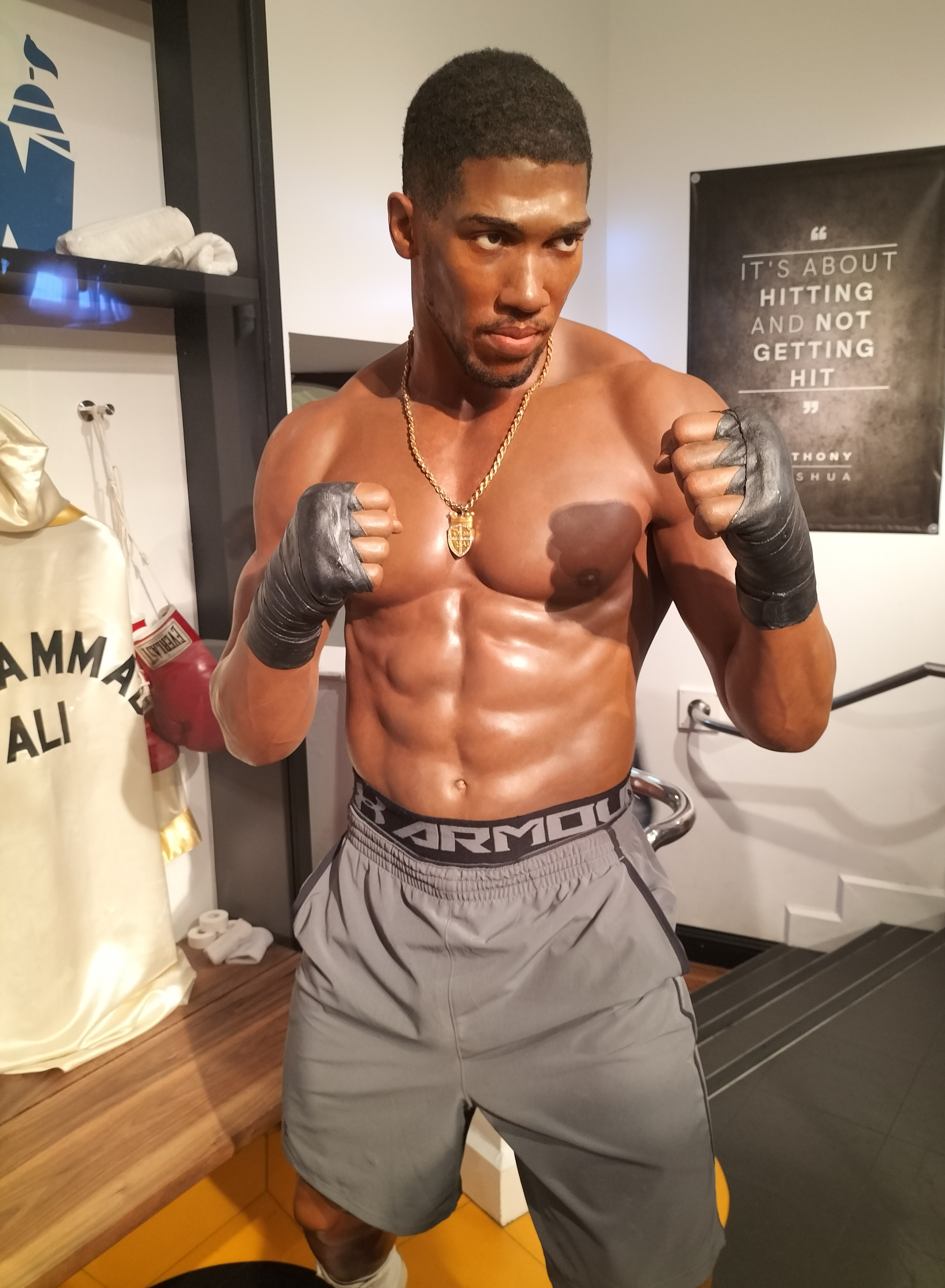
A wax figure of Joshua at Madame Tussauds, London

Joshua is recognised as one of the most marketable athletes in the world, and has lucrative endorsement deals with numerous brands, including Under Armour, Beats By Dre, and Lucozade. In 2017, he was ranked as the world's most marketable athlete, ahead of basketball player Stephen Curry, who was ranked most marketable the previous year. Along with his boxing ability, this has been attributed to his "rags to riches" story, enforcing a narrative that he avoided a life of violence and crime by dedicating himself to boxing. Joshua has spoken of his ambition to surpass Floyd Mayweather Jr.'s reported career earnings of $700 million, saying in an interview with GQ, "When I first started, the aim was to become a multi-millionaire. But now there are ordinary people, grandmas and grandads, who are worth millions just because of property prices. So the new school of thought is that I need to be a billionaire. Being a millionaire is good but you have to set your sights higher."

Joshua has also been recognised with his inclusion in the annual Powerlist as one of the 100 most influential Black Britons, most recently in the 2021 edition. He has a tattoo of the continent of Africa on his right shoulder, with the territory of Nigeria outlined, and says he feels a strong connection to his Nigerian roots. In addition, he has entered the ring in multiple fights prominently displaying the flag of Nigeria.

Joshua's manager, Freddie Cunningham, has supported him throughout all his professional career, and is referred to as his "right hand man". Cunningham co-founded Joshua's own management company, 258MGT.

In August 2022, Joshua faced questions around the controversy of his world-title challenge taking place in Saudi Arabia. He was also questioned about the human rights situation in the Kingdom, after the Arab authorities sentenced a 34-year-old woman for 34 years in prison over her Twitter activity. However, he said that people were "loving the positive side of things" and they "don't focus on anything that's negative". Yasser al-Khayat, whose brother Mustafa was executed by Saudi authorities, also wrote a letter to Joshua and urged him to stand up for the human rights. He wrote to Joshua that speaking out could make a real difference, as Saudi uses the events like boxing "to distract from its oppression".

== Personal life ==
In 2015, Joshua fathered a son named Joseph "JJ" Joshua with dance teacher Nicole Osbourne. Between 2017 and 2024, Joshua lived in Golders Green with his mother. In March 2026, he relocated to Dubai, United Arab Emirates. He fathered another child with Osbourne, a daughter, in 2026

Joshua has expressed an interest in chess as well as reading as a way to reinforce his boxing and tactical abilities. He was a bricklayer before taking up boxing full-time.

Joshua previously stated in 2012 that he does not support a football team, but when asked in an interview in 2017, he said that, although he supports his local team Watford, his "overall favourite" team was Real Madrid because of Cristiano Ronaldo, as Ronaldo was a Real Madrid player at the time. In the same interview, he also described English footballer Troy Deeney, whom he met by chance at a local barbershop in his hometown Watford, as his "good friend".

In an interview with iFL TV in July 2014, Joshua named Muhammad Ali, Mike Tyson, Larry Holmes, Lennox Lewis and Evander Holyfield as his top five greatest heavyweight boxers of all-time.

In February 2020, Joshua met with the Akarigbo of Remoland, Oba Babatunde Adewale Ajayi. In April 2020, Joshua spoke about his positive relationship with his longtime promoter Eddie Hearn, who has promoted him since his professional debut in 2013, saying that he and Eddie will always have a "great friendship". In December 2020, a popular street in Sagamu was renamed "Anthony Joshua Way" in his honour by the Ogun State government.

In 2023, Joshua joined the investment group of the French Alpine racing team of Formula One.

In February 2026, Anthony Joshua was listed on the Sunday Times Tax list with an estimated £11 million.

=== December 2025 car crash ===
On 29 December 2025, during a visit to Nigeria, Joshua was injured in a car crash on the Lagos–Ibadan Expressway, near the Sinoma area close to Sagamu in Ogun State, while travelling as a passenger in a Lexus LX570. The collision resulted in the deaths of two people, later identified as his personal trainer Latif "Latz" Ayodele and his strength and conditioning coach Sina Ghami, both of whom were also close friends of Joshua. Joshua was rescued from the vehicle by officials of the Federal Road Safety Corps (FRSC) and taken to the Duchess International Hospital in Lagos, where he was treated for injuries reported to be non-life-threatening.

According to a statement released by the FRSC, the LX570 in which Joshua was travelling struck a stationary red commercial Sinotruk truck that was parked by the roadside. Preliminary findings indicated that the vehicle was suspected to have been travelling above the speed limit and lost control during an overtaking manouvre, resulting in the collision. Local authorities stated that Joshua was discharged from hospital on 31 December and began his recovery at his home in Nigeria. The individual operating the vehicle, a hired driver, also survived. He was later charged by police with reckless and dangerous driving, as well as not having a valid driver's licence. The case was repeatedly adjourned by Ogun Magistrate Court 1, and in April 2026, following legal advice from the Department of Public Prosecution, the driver of the stationary truck was also criminally charged for reckless driving. As of September 2026, the hired driver faced one charge each of dangerous driving causing death, reckless and negligent driving, driving without due care and attention, and driving without a valid national driver's licence.

On 29 January 2026, Joshua made his first public video as a tribute to Ghami and Ayodele. He said: "One day my time will come and I am not scared either at all. It is actually comforting knowing [I have] two brothers on the other side. I've lost people before, but I do not think I have lost people like that. My left and my right". He added: "It ain't about legacy, it is just about doing what is right and I know I am going to do what is right by them. I know what I have got to do. I am going to do what is right by them, do what is right by their family and it is about what is important". On 15 March, Joshua spent Mothering Sunday with the mothers of Ghami and Ayodele. He made his first public appearance after the accident on 4 April, attending the main event of Derek Chisora vs. Deontay Wilder at the O2 Arena.

== Legal issues ==
In 2009, Joshua was put on remand in Reading Prison for two weeks for what he described as "fighting and other crazy stuff". He was made to wear an electronic tag on his ankle when released.

In March 2011, Joshua was pulled over by the police for speeding in Colindale, North West London. He was found with eight ounces (226.8 grams) of herbal cannabis hidden in a sports bag in his Mercedes-Benz. He was charged with possession with intent to supply a class B drug, an offence that carries a maximum 14-year sentence. Joshua was suspended from the GB Boxing squad and was sentenced to a 12-month community order and 100 hours' unpaid work after pleading guilty at crown court.

== Professional boxing record ==
34 fights	30 wins	4 losses
By knockout	27	2
By decision	3	2

No.	Result	Record	Opponent	Type	Round, time	Date	Location	Notes
34	Win	30–4	Kristian Prenga	KO	2 (12), 2:43	25 Jul 2026	Jeddah Superdome, Jeddah, Saudi Arabia	
33	Win	29–4	Jake Paul	KO	6 (8), 1:31	19 Dec 2025	Kaseya Center, Miami, Florida, US	
32	Loss	28–4	Daniel Dubois	KO	5 (12), 0:59	21 Sep 2024	Wembley Stadium, London, England	For IBF heavyweight title
31	Win	28–3	Francis Ngannou	KO	2 (10), 2:38	8 Mar 2024	Kingdom Arena, Riyadh, Saudi Arabia	
30	Win	27–3	Otto Wallin	RTD	5 (12), 3:00	23 Dec 2023	Kingdom Arena, Riyadh, Saudi Arabia	
29	Win	26–3	Robert Helenius	KO	7 (12), 1:27	12 Aug 2023	The O2 Arena, London, England	
28	Win	25–3	Jermaine Franklin	UD	12	1 Apr 2023	The O2 Arena, London, England	
27	Loss	24–3	Oleksandr Usyk	SD	12	20 Aug 2022	King Abdullah Sports City, Jeddah, Saudi Arabia	For WBA (Super), IBF, WBO, IBO, and vacant The Ring heavyweight titles
26	Loss	24–2	Oleksandr Usyk	UD	12	25 Sep 2021	Tottenham Hotspur Stadium, London, England	Lost WBA (Super), IBF, WBO, and IBO heavyweight titles
25	Win	24–1	Kubrat Pulev	KO	9 (12), 2:58	12 Dec 2020	Wembley Arena, London, England	Retained WBA (Super), IBF, WBO, and IBO heavyweight titles
24	Win	23–1	Andy Ruiz Jr.	UD	12	7 Dec 2019	Diriyah Arena, Diriyah, Saudi Arabia	Won WBA (Super), IBF, WBO, and IBO heavyweight titles
23	Loss	22–1	Andy Ruiz Jr.	TKO	7 (12), 1:33	1 Jun 2019	Madison Square Garden, New York City, New York, US	Lost WBA (Super), IBF, WBO, and IBO heavyweight titles
22	Win	22–0	Alexander Povetkin	TKO	7 (12), 1:59	22 Sep 2018	Wembley Stadium, London, England	Retained WBA (Super), IBF, WBO, and IBO heavyweight titles
21	Win	21–0	Joseph Parker	UD	12	31 Mar 2018	Principality Stadium, Cardiff, Wales	Retained WBA (Super), IBF, and IBO heavyweight titles; Won WBO heavyweight title
20	Win	20–0	Carlos Takam	TKO	10 (12), 1:34	28 Oct 2017	Principality Stadium, Cardiff, Wales	Retained WBA (Super), IBF, and IBO heavyweight titles
19	Win	19–0	Wladimir Klitschko	TKO	11 (12), 2:25	29 Apr 2017	Wembley Stadium, London, England	Retained IBF heavyweight title; Won vacant WBA (Super) and IBO heavyweight titles
18	Win	18–0	Éric Molina	TKO	3 (12), 2:02	10 Dec 2016	Manchester Arena, Manchester, England	Retained IBF heavyweight title
17	Win	17–0	Dominic Breazeale	TKO	7 (12), 1:01	25 Jun 2016	The O2 Arena, London, England	Retained IBF heavyweight title
16	Win	16–0	Charles Martin	KO	2 (12), 1:32	9 Apr 2016	The O2 Arena, London, England	Won IBF heavyweight title
15	Win	15–0	Dillian Whyte	TKO	7 (12), 1:27	12 Dec 2015	The O2 Arena, London, England	Retained WBC International and Commonwealth heavyweight titles; Won vacant British heavyweight title
14	Win	14–0	Gary Cornish	TKO	1 (12), 1:37	12 Sep 2015	The O2 Arena, London, England	Retained WBC International heavyweight title; Won vacant Commonwealth heavyweight title
13	Win	13–0	Kevin Johnson	TKO	2 (10), 1:22	30 May 2015	The O2 Arena, London, England	Retained WBC International heavyweight title
12	Win	12–0	Raphael Zumbano Love	TKO	2 (8), 1:21	9 May 2015	Barclaycard Arena, Birmingham, England	
11	Win	11–0	Jason Gavern	KO	3 (8), 1:21	4 Apr 2015	Metro Radio Arena, Newcastle, England	
10	Win	10–0	Michael Sprott	TKO	1 (10), 1:26	22 Nov 2014	Echo Arena, Liverpool, England	
9	Win	9–0	Denis Bakhtov	TKO	2 (10), 1:00	11 Oct 2014	The O2 Arena, London, England	Won vacant WBC International heavyweight title
8	Win	8–0	Konstantin Airich	TKO	3 (8), 1:16	13 Sep 2014	Phones 4u Arena, Manchester, England	
7	Win	7–0	Matt Skelton	TKO	2 (6), 2:33	12 Jul 2014	Echo Arena, Liverpool, England	
6	Win	6–0	Matt Legg	KO	1 (6), 1:23	31 May 2014	Wembley Stadium, London, England	
5	Win	5–0	Héctor Alfredo Ávila	KO	1 (6), 2:14	1 Mar 2014	Exhibition and Conference Centre, Glasgow, Scotland	
4	Win	4–0	Dorian Darch	TKO	2 (6), 0:51	1 Feb 2014	Motorpoint Arena, Cardiff, Wales	
3	Win	3–0	Hrvoje Kisiček	TKO	2 (6), 1:38	14 Nov 2013	York Hall, London, England	
2	Win	2–0	Paul Butlin	TKO	2 (6), 0:50	26 Oct 2013	Motorpoint Arena, Sheffield, England	
1	Win	1–0	Emanuele Leo	TKO	1 (6), 2:47	5 Oct 2013	The O2 Arena, London, England	

== Titles in boxing ==
=== Major world titles ===
- WBA (Super) heavyweight champion (over 200 pounds [91 kg]) (2×)
- IBF heavyweight champion (over 200 pounds [91 kg]) (2×)
- WBO heavyweight champion (over 200 pounds [91 kg]) (2×)

=== Minor world titles ===
- IBO heavyweight champion (over 200 pounds [91 kg]) (2×)

=== Regional/International titles ===
- WBC International heavyweight champion (over 200 pounds [91 kg])
- British heavyweight champion (over 200 pounds [91 kg])
- Commonwealth heavyweight champion (over 200 pounds [91 kg])

=== Honorary titles ===
- WBA Man of Triumph Gold champion
- WBO Super Champion

== Viewership ==
=== International ===
Date	Fight	Network	Country	Viewers	Source
29 April 2017	Joshua vs. Klitschko	RTL Television	Austria	329,000	
29 April 2017	Joshua vs. Klitschko	RTL Television	Germany	9,590,000	
29 April 2017	Joshua vs. Klitschko	Polsat Sport	Poland	920,000	
29 April 2017	Joshua vs. Klitschko	Inter	Ukraine	4,400,000	
29 April 2017	Joshua vs. Klitschko	Showtime	United States	687,000	
29 April 2017	Joshua vs. Klitschko	HBO	United States	890,000	
29 April 2017	Joshua vs. Klitschko	RTL Televizija	Croatia	688,953	
29 April 2017	Joshua vs. Klitschko	RTL Televizija	Croatia	335,664 (Note: Viewers aged 18–54)	
31 March 2018	Joshua vs. Parker	RTL Televizija	Croatia	230,965	
7 December 2019	Ruiz vs. Joshua II	DAZN	International	1,800,000	
7 December 2019	Ruiz vs. Joshua II	TVP1/TVP Sport	Poland	3,000,000	
20 August 2022	Usyk vs. Joshua II	MEGOGO	Ukraine	1,500,000	
19 December 2025	Paul vs. Joshua	Netflix	Worldwide	33,000,000	
Total viewership				56,458,918	

=== Pay-per-view bouts ===
United Kingdom
No.	Date	Fight	Network	Buys	Source(s)
1	12 December 2015	Joshua vs. Whyte	Sky Box Office	699,000	
2	9 April 2016	Martin vs. Joshua	Sky Box Office	1,368,000	
3	25 June 2016	Joshua vs. Breazeale	Sky Box Office	512,000	
4	10 December 2016	Joshua vs. Molina	Sky Box Office	764,000	
5	29 April 2017	Joshua vs. Klitschko	Sky Box Office	1,631,000	
6	28 October 2017	Joshua vs. Takam	Sky Box Office	1,009,000	
7	31 March 2018	Joshua vs. Parker	Sky Box Office	1,832,000	
8	22 September 2018	Joshua vs. Povetkin	Sky Box Office	1,247,000	
9	1 June 2019	Joshua vs. Ruiz	Sky Box Office	562,000	
10	7 December 2019	Ruiz vs. Joshua II	Sky Box Office	1,575,000	
11	12 December 2020	Joshua vs. Pulev	Sky Box Office	848,000	
12	25 September 2021	Joshua vs. Usyk	Sky Box Office	1,232,000	
13	20 August 2022	Usyk vs. Joshua II	Sky Box Office	1,249,000	
Total sales				14,690,000	

== See also ==
- List of world heavyweight boxing champions
- List of WBA world champions
- List of IBF world champions
- List of WBO world champions
- List of IBO world champions
- List of British heavyweight boxing champions
- List of Commonwealth Boxing Council champions
- List of Olympic medalists in boxing
- Boxing at the 2012 Summer Olympics

== Notes ==
Sporting positions
Amateur boxing titles
Previous: Simon Vallily	ABA super-heavyweight champion 2010–2011	Next: Joe Joyce
Previous: Roberto Cammarelle	Olympic super-heavyweight champion 2012	Next: Tony Yoka
Regional boxing titles
Vacant Title last held by Alexander Povetkin	WBC International heavyweight champion 30 May 2014 – 9 April 2016; Vacated	Vacant Title next held by Dillian Whyte
Vacant Title last held by Lucas Browne	Commonwealth heavyweight champion 12 September 2015 – 9 April 2016; Vacated	Vacant Title next held by Lenroy Thomas
Vacant Title last held by Tyson Fury	British heavyweight champion 12 December 2015 – 9 April 2016; Vacated	Vacant Title next held by Dillian Whyte
Minor world boxing titles
Vacant Title last held by Tyson Fury	IBO heavyweight champion 29 April 2017 – 1 June 2019	Succeeded by Andy Ruiz Jr.
Preceded by Andy Ruiz Jr.	IBO heavyweight champion 7 December 2019 – 25 September 2021	Succeeded by Oleksandr Usyk
Major world boxing titles
Preceded by Charles Martin	IBF heavyweight champion 9 April 2016 – 1 June 2019	Succeeded by Andy Ruiz Jr.
Vacant Title last held by Tyson Fury	WBA heavyweight champion Super title 29 April 2017 – 1 June 2019	Succeeded by Andy Ruiz Jr.
Preceded by Joseph Parker	WBO heavyweight champion 31 March 2018 – 1 June 2019	Succeeded by Andy Ruiz Jr.
Preceded by Andy Ruiz Jr.	WBA heavyweight champion Super title 7 December 2019 – 25 September 2021	Succeeded by Oleksandr Usyk
Preceded by Andy Ruiz Jr.	IBF heavyweight champion 7 December 2019 – 25 September 2021	Succeeded by Oleksandr Usyk
Preceded by Andy Ruiz Jr.	WBO heavyweight champion 7 December 2019 – 25 September 2021	Succeeded by Oleksandr Usyk
Awards
Previous: Vasyl Lomachenko	The Ring Prospect of the Year; 2014	Next: Takuma Inoue
Previous: Francisco Vargas vs. Orlando Salido	The Ring Fight of the Year vs. Wladimir Klitschko; 2017	Next: Canelo Álvarez vs. Gennady Golovkin II
Previous: Francisco Vargas vs. Orlando Salido	BWAA Fight of the Year vs. Wladimir Klitschko; 2017	Next: Jarrett Hurd vs. Erislandy Lara
Previous: Francisco Vargas vs. Orlando Salido	ESPN Fight of the Year vs. Wladimir Klitschko; 2017	Next: Jarrett Hurd vs. Erislandy Lara
Previous: Dillian Whyte vs. Derek Chisora; Round 5	ESPN Round of the Year vs. Wladimir Klitschko; Round 5	Next: Alex Saucedo vs. Lenny Zappavigna; Round 4
