= Jermaine Franklin =

American boxer (born 1993)

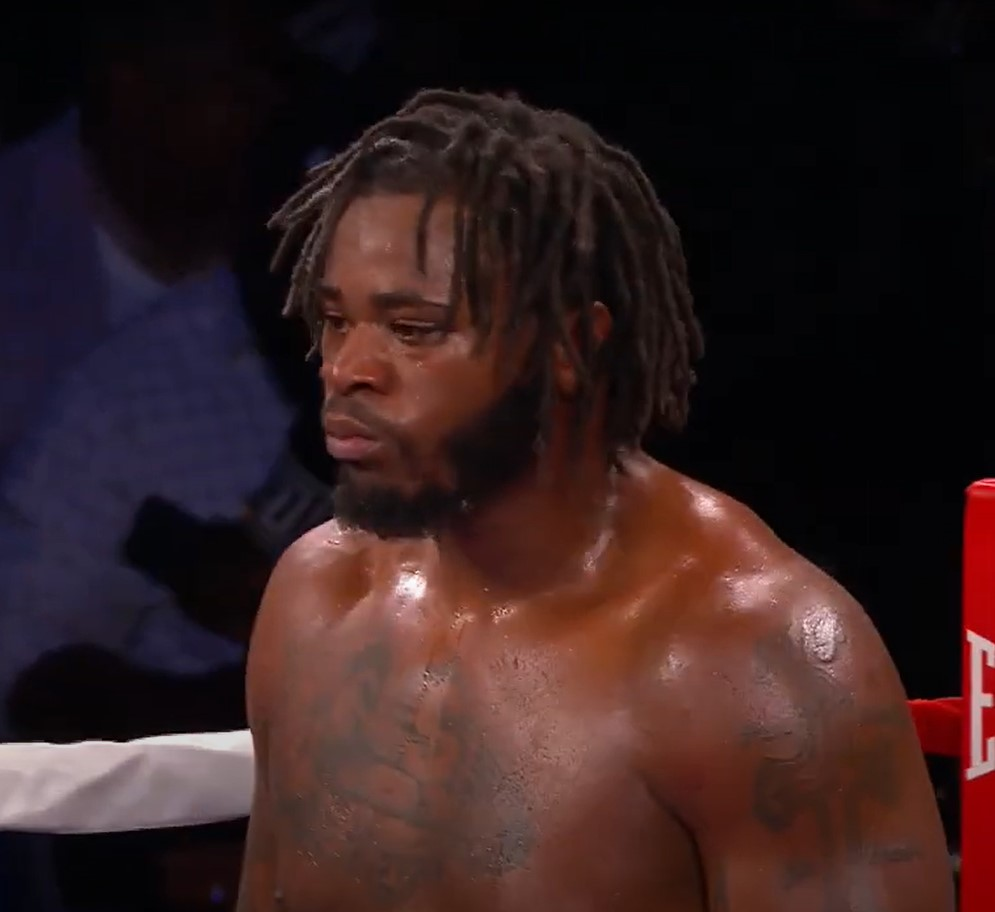

Personal information
- Nickname: 989 Assassin
- Born: October 21, 1993 (age 32) Saginaw, Michigan, U.S.
- Height: 6 ft 2 in (188 cm)
- Weight: Heavyweight

Boxing career
- Reach: 77 in (196 cm)
- Stance: Orthodox

Boxing record
- Total fights: 27
- Wins: 24
- Win by KO: 15
- Losses: 3
Medal record
Men's amateur boxing
Golden Gloves
Silver medal – second place	2013 Salt Lake City	Super-heavyweight
Gold medal – first place	2014 Las Vegas	Super-heavyweight

Jermaine Franklin (born October 21, 1993) is an American professional boxer.

== Early life ==
Franklin was born in Saginaw, Michigan, where he spent most of his time growing up. His stepfather introduced him to boxing around the age of 12 as a means to avoid fighting in the streets and to learn discipline. Coming from a challenging environment with high crime rates, his mother had to work hard to keep him on the right path.

His nickname '989 Assassin' is a reference to the area code of Saginaw, where Franklin was born.

== Amateur career ==
Franklin's amateur career was marked by some significant achievements, including a win over Cassius Chaney. He reached the finals of the 2013 National Golden Gloves Championship, losing to Cam F. Awesome. The two met again in the 2014 final, where Franklin avenged the loss and won on points. Despite an opportunity to compete in the 2016 Olympic Games, he decided to turn professional in 2015.

== Professional career ==
Franklin fought Dillian Whyte at Wembley Arena in London on November 26, 2022. Whyte won by majority decision, although the decision of the fight was controversial with many scoring it as a draw, or for Franklin winning.

A bout between Franklin and Anthony Joshua took place on April 1, 2023 at The O2 in London, with Joshua the winner by unanimous decision.

On March 28, 2026, Franklin fought Moses Itauma at the Co-op Live arena in Manchester, England. Following a dominant performance, Itauma won by TKO in the 5th round.

== Personal life ==
Between 2019 and 2022, Franklin filed for bankruptcy, due to financial and managerial issues, and worked 12-hour night shifts to support his family.

As of 2023, Franklin has two daughters and one son.

== Professional boxing record ==
27 fights	24 wins	3 losses
By knockout	15	1
By decision	9	2

No.	Result	Record	Opponent	Type	Round(s), time	Date	Location	Notes
27	Loss	24–3	Moses Itauma	KO	5 (10), 1:33	Mar 28, 2026	Co-op Live, Manchester, England	For WBA International and WBO Inter-Continental heavyweight titles
26	Win	24–2	Ivan Dychko	UD	10	Sep 13, 2025	Allegiant Stadium, Paradise, Nevada, U.S.	
25	Win	23–2	Devin Vargas	RTD	6 (10), 3:00	May 24, 2024	Wayne State Fieldhouse, Detroit, U.S.	
24	Win	22–2	Isaac Munoz Gutierrez	UD	10	Jul 15, 2023	The Masonic Temple Detroit, Detroit, Michigan, U.S.	
23	Loss	21–2	Anthony Joshua	UD	12	Apr 1, 2023	The O2 Arena, London, England	
22	Loss	21–1	Dillian Whyte	MD	12	Nov 26, 2022	Wembley Arena, London, England	
21	Win	21–0	Rodney Moore	TKO	5 (8), 0:34	May 7, 2022	McBride Hall, Gary, Indiana, U.S.	
20	Win	20–0	Pavel Sour	UD	10	Oct 5, 2019	Dort Federal Event Center, Flint, Michigan, U.S.	
19	Win	19–0	Jerry Forrest	SD	10	Jul 12, 2019	Emerald Queen Casino, Tacoma, Washington, U.S.	
18	Win	18–0	Rydell Booker	UD	10	Apr 13, 2019	Boardwalk Hall, Atlantic City, New Jersey, U.S.	
17	Win	17–0	Craig Lewis	UD	10	Jul 13, 2018	Motor City Casino, Detroit, Michigan, U.S.	
16	Win	16–0	Ed Fountain	TKO	8 (10), 1:32	Mar 3, 2018	Hollywood Casino Columbus, Columbus, Ohio, U.S.	
15	Win	15–0	Cory Phelps	KO	1 (10), 1:07	Dec 15, 2017	Derby Park Expo, Louisville, Kentucky, U.S.	
14	Win	14–0	Tyrell Wright	UD	8	Oct 19, 2017	Mayflower Hotel, Washington, D.C., U.S.	
13	Win	13–0	Daniel Pasciolla	TKO	6 (8), 2:36	Aug 12, 2017	Rivers Casino, Pittsburgh, Pennsylvania, U.S.	
12	Win	12–0	Akhror Muralimov	UD	8	Jul 29, 2017	Huntington Park, Columbus, Ohio, U.S.	
11	Win	11–0	Danny Calhoun	KO	1 (6), 0:59	Jun 9, 2017	St. Lucy's Palermo Hall, Youngstown, Ohio, U.S.	
10	Win	10–0	Daniel Adotey Allotey	KO	1 (6), 2:47	Apr 8, 2017	McBride Hall, Gary, Indiana, U.S.	
9	Win	9–0	Adam Collins	TKO	1 (6), 2:06	Dec 17, 2016	Mountaineer Casino Ballroom, New Cumberland, West Virginia, U.S.	
8	Win	8–0	Robbie Mendez	TKO	1 (4), 1:37	Oct 7, 2016	Radisson Hotel, Covington, Kentucky, U.S.	
7	Win	7–0	Willie Jake Jr	TKO	5 (6), 1:15	May 27, 2016	Old National Centre - Egyptian Room, Indianapolis, Indiana, U.S.	
6	Win	6–0	Wesley Triplett	TKO	6 (6), 2:09	Mar 26, 2016	Ukrainian Hall, Youngstown, Ohio, U.S.	
5	Win	5–0	Kareem Brann	TKO	1 (4), 2:28	Dec 12, 2015	Ring of Dreams Boxing Gym, Winston-Salem, North Carolina, U.S.	
4	Win	4–0	Nicholas Thompson	UD	4	Oct 17, 2015	Civic Center, Hammond, Indiana, U.S.	
3	Win	3–0	Preston King	KO	1 (4), 0:27	Aug 22, 2015	DeSander Pavilion, Saint Johns, Michigan, U.S.	
2	Win	2–0	Vandale Slade	TKO	1 (4), 1:40	Jun 26, 2015	Serbian American Cultural Center, Weirton, West Virginia, U.S.	
1	Win	1–0	Deshawn Jenkins	TKO	1 (4), 2:07	Apr 4, 2015	Riverside Ballroom, Green Bay, Wisconsin, U.S.	
