= Amir Khan =

Amir Khan may refer to:

== Sports ==
- Amir Khan (Guyanese cricketer) (born 1992), Guyanese cricketer
- Amir Khan (Indian cricketer), Indian cricketer
- Ameer Khan (Pakistani cricketer) (born 1982), former first-class cricketer
- Amir Khan (boxer) (born 1986), British professional boxer
- Mohammad Amir Khan (cricketer)

== Politics ==
- Amir Ahmad Khan, politician in the All India Muslim League
- Amir Alam Khan, Indian politician
- Amir Asghar Khan, prime minister of Iran
- Amir Azam Khan (1912–1976)
- Amir Farzand Khan, Pakistani politician
- Amir Khan (politician), co-founder of the MQM-Haqiqi Pakistani political party and currently a leader of MQM
- Amir Mohammad Khan (1910–1967), Malik of Kalabagh
- Ameer Muhammad Khan (born 1972), Pakistani politician
- Amir Khan (Tonk State) (1768–1834), Nawab of Tong

== Military ==
- Amir Khan I, Subedar of Thatta, Sindh, Pakistan during the reigns of Mughal Emperors, Jahangir and Shah Jahan
- Amir Khan II (died 1698), Subedar of Kabul, Afghanistan during the reigns of Mughal Emperors, Shah Jahan and Alamgir I
- Amir Khan III (died 1747), Subedar of Allahabad, Uttar Pradesh, India during the reigns of Mughal Emperor, Muhammad Shah
- Amir Abdullah Khan, Emir of the First East Turkestan Republic
- Amir Habibullah Khan, Emir of Afghanistan
- Amir Yakoub Khan, Emir of Afghanistan

== Others ==
- Amir Khan (singer) (1912–1974), Indian classical singer
- Amir Khan (Guantanamo captive 900), alternate name of Mohammed Jawad, Guantanamo captive 900
- Amir Khan (EastEnders), fictional character
- Amir Ullah Khan, Indian economist
- Amir Khan, fictional character from the Backyard Sports franchise

== See also ==
- Amer Khan
- Mohammad Amir Khan (disambiguation)
- Aamir Khan (born 1965), Indian film actor, director and producer
- Aamir Khan (Marvel Cinematic Universe), fictional character in Ms. Marvel
- Ameer Khan Khandara, 19th-century Indian musician
- Amar Khan, Pakistani actress, director and writer
