= Anthony Joshua vs. Carlos Takam =

Boxing match

- Date: 28 October 2017
- Venue: Principality Stadium, Cardiff, Wales
- Title(s) on the line: WBA (Super), IBF, and IBO heavyweight titles

Tale of the tape
Boxer	Anthony Joshua	Carlos Takam
Nickname	AJ	
Hometown	London, England	Douala, Cameroon
Purse	£10,000,000	
Pre-fight record	19–0 (19 KO)	35–3–1 (27 KO)
Age	28 years	36 years, 10 months
Height	6 ft 6 in (198 cm)	6 ft 1 in (185 cm)
Weight	254 lb (115 kg)	235 lb (107 kg)
Style	Orthodox	Orthodox
Recognition	WBA (Super), IBF and IBO; Heavyweight Champion; The Ring; No. 1 Ranked Heavyweight	IBF; No. 2 Ranked Heavyweight

Result
- Joshua wins via 10th-round technical knockout

Anthony Joshua vs. Carlos Takam was a professional boxing match contested on 28 October 2017, for the WBA (Super), IBF, and IBO heavyweight championship. The bout took place at the Principality Stadium in Cardiff, Wales. Joshua defeated Takam, retaining his heavyweight titles via tenth-round technical knockout (TKO).

== Background ==
Following Joshua's win over Wladimir Klitschko in April 2017, unifying the WBA (Super) and IBF titles and capturing the IBO, the IBF granted Joshua an exemption from fighting their mandatory challenger, Kubrat Pulev, in order to allow Joshua to fulfil a contractual rematch obligation with Klitschko. After Klitschko announced his retirement on 3 August, the IBF ordered Joshua to negotiate a deal with Pulev by 3 September. On 5 September, Joshua's promoter, Eddie Hearn, officially announced Joshua vs. Pulev would take place on 28 October at the Principality Stadium in Cardiff, Wales.

Less than two weeks before the fight, rumours began to circulate that Pulev had suffered an injury, putting the fight in jeopardy. The rumours proved to be true, leading Hearn to announce that Takam had stepped in to replace Pulev with just 12 days notice. Hearn also revealed that during the initial negotiations with Pulev, he had also been negotiating with Takam to be held in reserve as a replacement in the event that Pulev pulled out.

== The fights ==
=== Undercard ===
The preliminary bouts featured wins for prospects Lawrence Okolie and Joshua Buatsi. The first bout on the PPV card saw Frank Buglioni defend his British light-heavyweight title against unbeaten contender Craig Richards, who came in as a late replacement for Commonwealth champion Callum Johnson, who pulled out a week before the fight due to a medical condition. Buglioni's work rate would see him grind out a wide unanimous decision victory with scores of two scores of 117–111 and one of 116–113.

=== Yafai vs. Ishida ===
The first world title bout on the card saw WBA super-flyweight champion Khalid Yafai make the second defence of his title against No. 1 ranked Sho Ishida.

==== The fight ====
Despite having a height advantage over the champion, Ishida was unable to deal the with speed of Yafai. The fight went the distance and Yafai was awarded a unanimous decision victory with scores of 118–110, 116–112 and 116–112.

=== Sánchez vs. Taylor ===
The next bout saw former two-weight world champion Anahí Ester Sánchez face 2012 Olympic gold medallist Katie Taylor. Sánchez was set to defend her WBA lightweight title on the night, however, she failed to make weight and was subsequently stripped with the title on the line for Taylor only.

==== The fight ====
After controlling the first round with her speed and power, Taylor dropped the former champion to the canvas with a body shot in the second. Sánchez was hurt again in the next round after a right hand from Taylor caused her to stagger. Sánchez had some success in the fifth, landing right hands to force Taylor onto the back foot. Taylor regained control for the rest of the fight to secure a wide unanimous decision victory, with all three judges scoring the bout 99–90 to hand Taylor her first world title.

Preceded by vs. Jasmine Clarkson	Katie Taylor's bouts 28 October 2017	Succeeded by vs. Jessica McCaskill
Preceded by vs. Cecilia Sofia Mena	Anahí Ester Sánchez's bouts 28 October 2017	Succeeded by vs. Ruth Stephanie Aquino

=== Whyte vs. Helenius ===
The chief support saw WBC International champion Dillian Whyte (WBC:3rd IBF:5th WBO:6th WBA:8th) face former 2 time European heavyweight champion Robert Helenius (IBF:7th WBC:16th) for the WBC Silver belt.

==== The fight ====
Helenius started the fight well hurting Whyte in the second round. Whyte bounced back and dominated the remainder of the fight with Helenius reluctant to throw anything meaningful to win the rounds.

Whyte would win a unanimous decision with scorecards reading 119–109 twice, and 118–110.

Preceded by vs. Malcolm Tann	Dillian Whyte's bouts 28 October 2017	Succeeded by vs. Lucas Browne
Preceded by vs. Evgeny Orlov	Robert Helenius's bouts 28 October 2017	Succeeded by vs. Yury Bykhautsou

=== Main Event ===
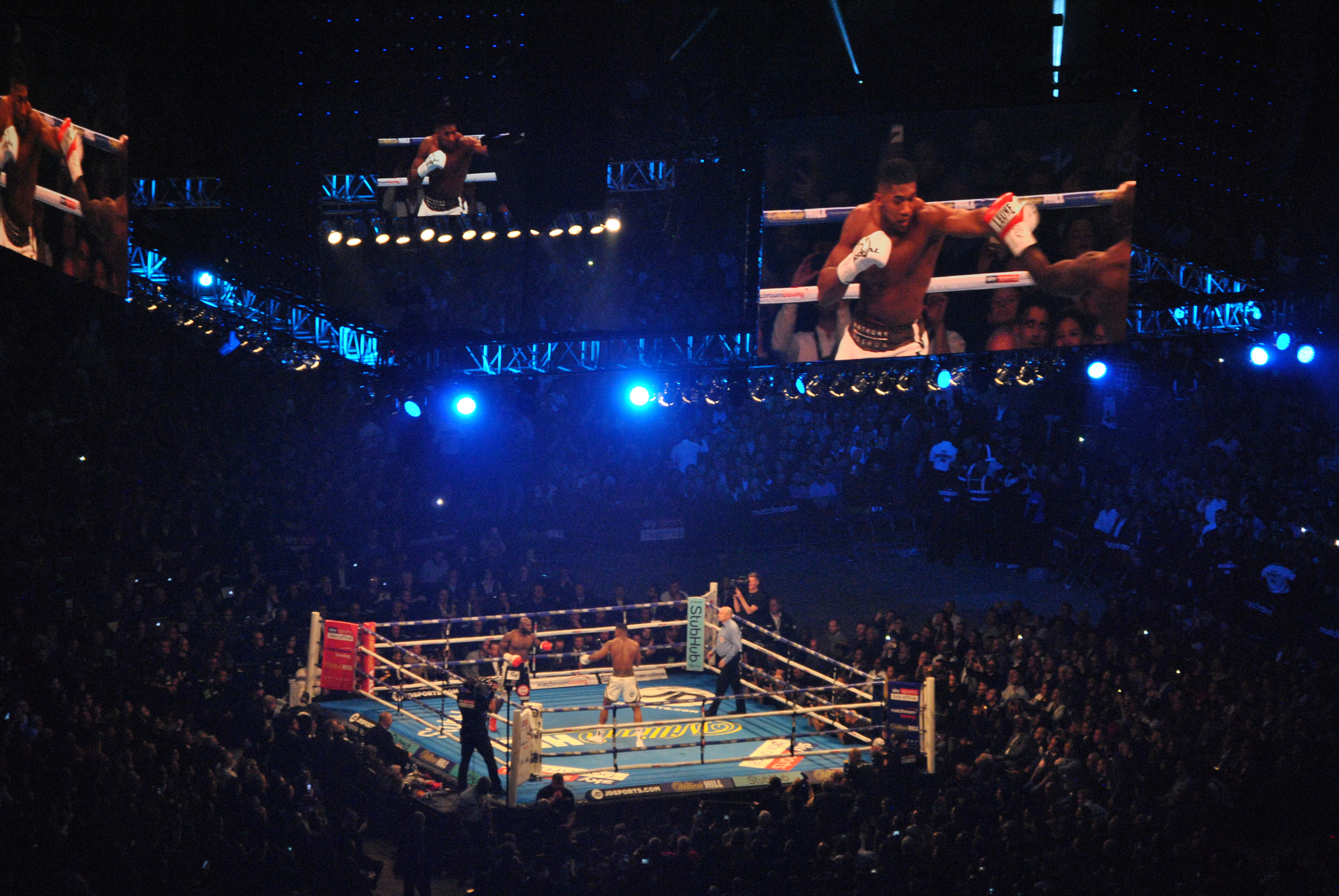
Joshua and Takam in action

Round one saw little action, with Joshua taking the centre of the ring while Takam remained on the back foot. The second round saw Joshua increase his punch output following an accidental headbutt, causing blood to flow from Joshua's nose. After a slow third round, the action picked up in the fourth with both fighters increasing their punch output. Takam received a cut above his right eye from a left hook early in the round. In the final 20 seconds, Joshua landed a solid counter left hook which caused Takam to stumble and touch the canvas with his right glove, scoring a knockdown for Joshua.

The champion began landing punches on Takam with more frequency in the fifth. A minute into the round, referee Phil Edwards called a halt to the action to allow the ringside doctor to examine the cut above Takam's right eye. After a brief examination, Edwards resumed the contest. Despite being cut above the left eye in the seventh, Takam was able to land a few punches on the champion. At the beginning of the ninth round, Edwards once again halted the action to allow the ringside doctor to examine the cuts above Takam's eyes. With the doctor deeming Takam fit to continue, Edwards resumed the contest.

The end came in the tenth after Joshua landed several unanswered punches on Takam, prompting Edwards to call off the fight, with Joshua retaining his titles via technical knockout.

== Aftermath ==
Speaking after the bout Joshua said "I come to fight. I don't sit on the edge and make decisions. It was a good fight until the ref stopped it, so I have the utmost respect for Takam. People want to see Takam unconscious on the floor, and that's what I was trying to get to." Takam would call for another shot at the champion saying "I want a rematch. I made my preparations with 12 days to fight Anthony. I want to box him again. I want him. He is a great champion."

While some criticized the stoppage, BBC boxing correspondent Mike Costello didn't, saying "I don't have a problem with it. Surely with the blood flowing the way it was, Takam could barely have seen. I've seen too many sob stories at this stage of a fight for me to complain about that stoppage."

== Fight card ==
Confirmed bouts:

Weight Class		vs.		Method	Round	Time	Notes
Heavyweight	(United Kingdom) Anthony Joshua (c)	def.	(France) Carlos Takam	TKO	10/12	1:34	^{Note 1}
Heavyweight	(United Kingdom) Dillian Whyte	def.	(Finland) Robert Helenius	UD	12		^{Note 2}
Lightweight	(Republic of Ireland) Katie Taylor	def.	(Argentina) Anahí Ester Sánchez	UD	10		^{Note 3}
Super-flyweight	(United Kingdom) Khalid Yafai (c)	def.	(Japan) Sho Ishida	UD	12		^{Note 4}
Light-heavyweight	(United Kingdom) Frank Buglioni (c)	def.	(United Kingdom) Craig Richards	UD	12		^{Note 5}
Preliminary bouts
Light-heavyweight	(United Kingdom) Joshua Buatsi	def.	(France) Saidou Sall	PTS	6
Cruiserweight	(United Kingdom) Lawrence Okolie	def.	(United Kingdom) Adam Williams	TKO	3/6	2:28
Non-TV bouts
Lightweight	(United Kingdom) Joe Cordina	def.	(Nicaragua) Lester Cantillano	PTS	4
Unfought floater bouts
Heavyweight	(United Kingdom) David Allen	vs.	(United Kingdom) Scott Saward	N/a	6

^Note 1 For WBA (Super), IBF, and IBO heavyweight titles
^Note 2 For vacant WBC Silver heavyweight title
^Note 3 For vacant WBA lightweight title
^Note 4 For WBA super-flyweight title
^Note 5 For British light-heavyweight title

== Broadcasting ==
Country	Broadcaster
Australia	Fox Sports
Canada	DAZN
France	Canal+
Germany	RTL
Hungary	Sport 2
Ireland	Sky Sports
Italy	Sky Sport
Panama	Cable Onda Sports
United Kingdom	Sky Sports
United States	Showtime

Preceded by vs. Wladimir Klitschko	Anthony Joshua' bouts 28 October 2017	Succeeded by vs. Joseph Parker
Preceded by vs. Ivica Bacurin	Carlos Takam's bouts 28 October 2017	Succeeded by vs. Derek Chisora
