= Joshua Buatsi =

Ghanaian born British boxer (born 1993)

Personal information
- Nickname: Just Business
- Nationality: British; Ghanaian
- Born: 14 March 1993 (age 33) Accra, Ghana
- Height: 6 ft 2 in (188 cm)
- Weight: Light-heavyweight

Boxing career
- Reach: 74 1/2 in (189 cm)
- Stance: Orthodox

Boxing record
- Total fights: 22
- Wins: 20
- Win by KO: 13
- Losses: 2
Medal record
Men's Amateur boxing
Representing Great Britain
Olympic Games
Bronze medal – third place	2016 Rio de Janeiro	Light heavyweight
European Championships
Bronze medal – third place	2015 Samokov	Light heavyweight
Representing England
English National Championships
Bronze medal – third place	2013 London	Light heavyweight
Gold medal – first place	2014 Liverpool	Light heavyweight
Gold medal – first place	2015 Liverpool	Light heavyweight

Joshua Buatsi (born 14 March 1993) is a Ghanaian-born British professional boxer. He held the World Boxing Organization (WBO) interim light-heavyweight title from 2024 to 2025. He also challenged for the World Boxing Council (WBC) light-heavyweight title in 2026. At regional level, he has held the British light-heavyweight title twice between 2019 and 2024; and the Commonwealth light-heavyweight title in 2024. As an amateur, he won a bronze medal at the 2015 European Championships and the 2016 Olympics.

== Early life ==
Buatsi was born on 14 March 1993 in Accra, Ghana. After his family moved to the UK, they resided in Monks Hill Estate, Croydon, South London. Buatsi studied at Edenham High School. Buatsi graduated with a 2:1 degree in Management with Sports Science from St Mary's University, Twickenham, while also competing as an amateur boxer.

== Amateur career ==
Buatsi started his early boxing career at the South Norwood and Victory club, Charnwood Road, Crystal Palace, London, England. His trainer, Terry Smith, worked hard with Buatsi right up until he signed with Hearn's Matchroom Boxing. Mark Gillespie, the second coach at SNaV, followed Buatsi into the professional circuit both leaving their amateur roots.

At the 2016 European Boxing Olympic Qualification Tournament held in Samsun, Turkey, Buatsi defeated Ukraine's Oleksandr Khyzhniak in his semi-final and Dutch boxer Peter Müllenberg in the final of the light-heavyweight tournament to win gold and to secure his place in Rio as part of the Great Britain team.

At the 2016 Summer Olympics in the men's light-heavyweight competition, he defeated Elshod Rasulov of Uzbekistan with a third-round knockout, to progress to the quarter finals.

== Professional career ==
Buatsi made his professional debut on 1 July 2017, when he fought Carlos Mena at The O2 Arena. Buatsi won the fight by knockout in the second round. He next fought on 1 September against Baptiste Castegnaro, winning by knockout in the fifth round. On 28 October 2017, on the undercard of Anthony Joshua vs. Carlos Takam at the Principality Stadium in Cardiff, Wales, Buatsi fought Saidou Sall in a six round bout, winning the bout 60-54.

Buatsi’s first fight of 2018 was against Jordan Joseph, he won the bout by stoppage in the second round after Joseph’s corner threw the towel in. He went on to defeat Bartlomiej Grafka 60-54 over six rounds on 31 March and Stephane Cuevas by knockout in the fifth round on the undercard of Tony Bellew vs. David Haye on 5 May.

On 23 March 2019, Buatsi defeated Liam Conroy via technical knockout in round three to claim the vacant British light-heavyweight title at the Copper Box Arena in London, England.

In his US debut, on the Anthony Joshua vs. Andy Ruiz Jr. undercard at Madison Square Garden, Buatsi defeated Mexican veteran and former title challenger Marco Antonio Peribán within four rounds. Buatsi first dropped his opponent, and after he got up, unleashed a flurry of shots at him, forcing the referee to stop the fight.

In his next fight, Buatsi faced another veteran, Canadian Ryan Ford. Ford proved to be a good test for the young Buatsi, but in the end, Buatsi managed to get a seventh-round stoppage.

On 15 May 2021, Buatsi fought Frenchman Daniel Dos Santos at the AO Arena in Manchester, winning by devastating knockout with a well-timed right hand in the fourth round. Buatsi followed this up by beating Ričards Bolotņiks with an eleventh round knock out as the main event on the final instalment of Matchroom Boxing's Fight Camp series. For the last two fights, Joshua has been under the tutelage of Virgil Hunter, the former trainer of Andre Ward, with both of his most recent camps taking place at Virgil's gym in California.

Buatsi won the British and Commonwealth light-heavyweight titles with a unanimous decision win over defending champion Dan Azeez at Wembley Arena on 3 February 2024.

In his next fight, he became the WBO interim light-heavyweight champion thanks to a split decision win over Willy Hutchinson at Wembley Stadium on 21 September 2024. Buatsi twice knocked his opponent to the canvas before having his hand raised after two ringside judges scored the contest in his favour 117-108 and 115-110 respectively, while the third had it for Hutchinson 113-112.

Buatsi lost the title and his unbeaten professional record when he was beaten via unanimous decision by former unified super-middleweight world champion and fellow Briton Callum Smith at The Venue Riyadh Season in Riyadh, Saudi Arabia, on 22 February 2025.

On 1 August 2025, it was announced that Buatsi had signed with Frank Warren's Queensbury Promotions.

Buatsi defeated Zach Parker by majority decision over 10 rounds at Co-op Live Arena in Manchester on 1 November 2025. Two of the ringside judges scored the bout 96–94 in his favour, while the third had it a 95–95 draw. Despite Parker's request, the WBA rejected an immediate rematch request.

On 7 November 2026 at the AO Arena in Manchester, Buatsi faced Willy Hutchinson for the vacant WBC light-heavyweight title. He lost by unanimous decision.

== Outside the ring ==
Buatsi was managed by two-time world heavyweight champion Anthony Joshua. He is now self-managed. He founded the Joshua Buatsi foundation, a Ghanaian-based non-profit social enterprise focused on boxing.

== Professional boxing record ==
22 fights	20 wins	2 losses
By knockout	13	0
By decision	7	2

No.	Result	Record	Opponent	Type	Round, time	Date	Location	Notes
22	Loss	20–2	Willy Hutchinson	UD	12	7 Nov 2026	Manchester Arena, Manchester, England	For vacant WBC light-heavyweight title
21	Win	20–1	Zach Parker	MD	10	1 Nov 2025	Co-op Live, Manchester, England	Won vacant WBA International light-heavyweight title
20	Loss	19–1	Callum Smith	UD	12	22 Feb 2025	The Venue Riyadh Season, Riyadh, Saudi Arabia	Lost WBO interim light-heavyweight title
19	Win	19–0	Willy Hutchinson	SD	12	21 Sep 2024	Wembley Stadium, London, England	Won WBO interim light-heavyweight title
18	Win	18–0	Dan Azeez	UD	12	3 Feb 2024	OVO Arena, London, England	Won British and Commonwealth light-heavyweight titles
17	Win	17–0	Paweł Stępień	UD	10	7 May 2023	Resorts World Arena, Birmingham, England	
16	Win	16–0	Craig Richards	UD	12	21 May 2022	The O2 Arena, London, England	
15	Win	15–0	Ričards Bolotņiks	TKO	11 (12), 2:08	14 Aug 2021	Matchroom Fight Camp, Brentwood, England	
14	Win	14–0	Daniel Dos Santos	TKO	4 (10), 2:44	15 May 2021	AO Arena, Manchester, England	Retained WBA International light-heavyweight title
13	Win	13–0	Marko Calic	TKO	7 (12), 2:09	4 Oct 2020	Marshall Arena, Milton Keynes, England	Retained WBA International light-heavyweight title
12	Win	12–0	Ryan Ford	KO	7 (10), 1:07	31 Aug 2019	The O2 Arena, London, England	Retained WBA International light-heavyweight title
11	Win	11–0	Marco Antonio Peribán	TKO	4 (10), 1:39	1 Jun 2019	Madison Square Garden, New York City, New York, US	Retained WBA International light-heavyweight title
10	Win	10–0	Liam Conroy	TKO	3 (12), 1:53	23 Mar 2019	Copper Box Arena, London, England	Won vacant British light-heavyweight title
9	Win	9–0	Renold Quinlan	TKO	1 (10), 1:50	22 Dec 2018	The O2 Arena, London, England	Retained WBA International light-heavyweight title
8	Win	8–0	Tony Averlant	TKO	1 (10), 2:53	13 Oct 2018	Metro Radio Arena, Newcastle, England	Retained WBA International light-heavyweight title
7	Win	7–0	Andrejs Pokumeiko	TKO	1 (10), 1:51	28 Jul 2018	The O2 Arena, London, England	Won vacant WBA International light-heavyweight title
6	Win	6–0	Stephane Cuevas	TKO	5 (8), 0:50	5 May 2018	The O2 Arena, London, England	
5	Win	5–0	Bartlomiej Grafka	PTS	6	31 Mar 2018	Principality Stadium, Cardiff, Wales	
4	Win	4–0	Jordan Joseph	TKO	2 (6), 2:43	3 Feb 2018	The O2 Arena, London, England	
3	Win	3–0	Saidou Sall	PTS	6	28 Oct 2017	Principality Stadium, Cardiff, Wales	
2	Win	2–0	Baptiste Castegnaro	TKO	5 (6), 1:06	1 Sep 2017	York Hall, London, England	
1	Win	1–0	Carlos Mena	TKO	2 (6), 1:19	1 Jul 2017	The O2 Arena, London, England	

== See also ==
- List of male boxers

Sporting positions
Amateur boxing titles
Previous: Ricky Crotty	English Amateur light-Heavyweight champion 2014–2015	Next: Tom Whittaker-Hart
Regional boxing titles
Vacant Title last held by Erik Skoglund	WBA International light-heavyweight champion 28 July 2018 – August 2021; Vacated	Vacant Title next held by Craig Richards
Vacant Title last held by Callum Johnson	British light-heavyweight champion 23 March 2019 – September 2019; Vacated	Vacant Title next held by Shakan Pitters
Preceded by Dan Azeez	British light-heavyweight champion 3 February 2024 – 21 September 2024; Won interim title	Vacant Title next held by Lewis Edmondson
Preceded by Dan Azeez	Commonwealth light-heavyweight champion 3 February 2024 – 21 September 2024; Won interim title	Vacant Title next held by Lewis Edmondson
World boxing titles
Vacant Title last held by Nathan Cleverly	WBO light-heavyweight champion Interim title 21 September 2024 – 22 February 2025	Succeeded by Callum Smith
