= Craig Richards (boxer) =

English boxer (born 1990)

Personal information
- Nickname: Spider
- Born: 30 April 1990 (age 36) Lewisham, England
- Height: 6 ft 1 in (185 cm)
- Weight: Super-middleweight; Light-heavyweight

Boxing career
- Reach: 73 in (185 cm)
- Stance: Orthodox

Boxing record
- Total fights: 26
- Wins: 20
- Win by KO: 13
- Losses: 5
- Draws: 1

Craig Richards (born 30 April 1990) is an English professional boxer. He has challenged for the WBA (Super) light-heavyweight in 2021. Richards held the British light-heavyweight title from 2020 to 2021

== Professional career ==
Richards made his professional debut on 28 May 2015, scoring a first-round technical knockout (TKO) victory over a scheduled four rounds against James Child at the York Hall in London. He ended 2015 with a points decision (PTS) win against Scott Douglas in October.

He tallied up another five wins in 2016; Kieron Gray on PTS in January; a TKO over Richard Horton in June; Dalton Miller and Adam Jones by PTS in September; and a TKO over Bronislav Kubin in November.

On 17 March 2017, Richards fought for his first professional title, winning via ten-round unanimous decision (UD) against Alan Higgins at the York Hall to capture the Southern Area super-middleweight. He secured a PTS win against Rui Pavanito in July and a TKO win over Norbert Szekeres in October. Two days after his win over Szekeres, Callum Johnson pulled out of his British and Commonwealth light-heavyweight unification fight with Frank Buglioni. Richards was brought in as a last minute opponent at five days notice. The fight took place on 28 October at the Principality Stadium in Cardiff, Wales, and was aired live on Sky Sports Box Office as part of the undercard for Anthony Joshua vs. Carlos Takam. Richards suffered the first defeat of his professional career, losing by UD over twelve rounds. Two judges scored the bout 117–111 while the third scored it 116–113.

Richards came back with three stoppage wins in 2018; Ivan Stupalo in March; Bosko Misic in June; and Michal Ludwiczak in October. He began 2019 with a third-round TKO win against Jake Ball to capture the vacant WBA Intercontinental light-heavyweight title. The bout took place on 2 February at The O2 Arena in London. He had two more fights that year; a twelve-round UD victory against Andre Sterling in June and an eight-round draw against Chad Sugden in December.

It was announced in September 2020 that Richards would make a second attempt at the British title, this time against reigning champion Shakan Pitters on 14 November at the Fly By Nite Rehearsal Studios in Redditch. However, Pitters withdrew from the bout on medical advice after suffering an injury during training, with a new date being scheduled for 18 December at the same venue. Richards scored a knockdown in the fourth round, dropping the champion to the canvas with a right hook. Pitters made it back to his feet before the referee's count of ten to see out the remainder of the round on his feet. Richards scored a second knockdown in the ninth round, this time with a left hook. Pitters again made it back to his feet, but on unsteady legs, prompting referee Victor Loughlin to call a halt to the contest at 2 minutes and 42 seconds, awarding Richards the British title via ninth-round TKO.

In March 2021, it was announced that Richards would challenge for his first world title, facing reigning champion Dmitry Bivol for the WBA (Super) light-heavyweight title on 1 May at the AO Arena in Manchester. As part of the undercard for Joseph Parker vs. Derek Chisora. He lost the bout via unanimous decision.

In 30 October 2021 at the O2 Arena in London, Richards won the vacant WBA International light-heavyweight title with a sixth round stoppage of Marek Matyja.

At the same venue on 21 May 2022, he faced unbeaten Olympic bronze medalist, Joshua Buatsi, losing via unanimous decision.

Richards then took 21 months away from the competitive boxing ring, before returning on 10 February 2024 with a seventh round stoppage win over Boris Crighton at Indigo at The O2 in London.

In his next outing, he faced Willy Hutchinson for the vacant WBC Silver light-heavyweight title at Kingdom Arena in Riyadh, Saudi Arabia on 1 June 2024, as part of the Queensbury vs Matchroom "5 vs 5" event. He lost by unanimous decision.

Richards got back to winning ways on 1 March 2025, thanks to an eighth round knockout success over Padraig McCrory at the SSE Arena in Belfast, Northern Ireland.

He faced Dan Azeez at Legon Sports Stadium in Accra, Ghana, on 20 December 2025. Richards won by stoppage in the final round to claim the vacant IBF International light-heavyweight title.

On 26 September 2026, he fought Radivoje Kalajdzic over 10 rounds at the Copper Box Arena in London as part of |Zuffa Boxing 11. Richards was knocked to the canvas in the final round and lost via unanimous decision.

== Professional boxing record ==
25 fights	20 wins	4 losses
By knockout	13	0
By decision	7	4
Draws	1	

No.	Result	Record	Opponent	Type	Round, time	Date	Location	Notes
26	Loss	20–5–1	Radivoje Kalajdzic	UD	10	26 Sep 2026	Copper Box Arena, London, England	
25	Win	20–4–1	Dan Azeez	KO	12 (12), 0:23	20 Dec 2025	Legon Sports Stadium, Accra, Ghana	Won vacant IBF International light-heavyweight title
24	Win	19–4–1	Padraig McCrory	KO	8 (10), 1:58	1 Mar 2025	The SSE Arena, Belfast, Northern Ireland	
23	Loss	18–4–1	Willy Hutchinson	UD	12	1 Jun 2024	Kingdom Arena, Riyadh, Saudi Arabia	For vacant WBC Silver light-heavyweight title.
22	Win	18–3–1	Boris Crighton	TKO	7 (10), 2:52	10 Feb 2024	Indigo at The O2, Greenwich, England	
21	Loss	17–3–1	Joshua Buatsi	UD	12	21 May 2022	The O2 Arena, London, England	
20	Win	17–2–1	Marek Matyja	TKO	6 (10), 2:34	30 Oct 2021	The O2 Arena, London, England	Won vacant WBA International light-heavyweight title.
19	Loss	16–2–1	Dmitry Bivol	UD	12	1 May 2021	AO Arena, Manchester, England	For WBA (Super) light-heavyweight title.
18	Win	16–1–1	Shakan Pitters	TKO	9 (12), 2:42	18 Dec 2020	Fly By Nite Rehearsal Studios, Redditch, England	Won British light-heavyweight title.
17	Draw	15–1–1	Chad Sugden	PTS	8	19 Dec 2019	York Hall, London, England	
16	Win	15–1	Andre Sterling	UD	12	21 Jun 2019	York Hall, London, England	
15	Win	14–1	Jake Ball	TKO	3 (10), 2:27	2 Feb 2019	The O2 Arena, London, England	Won vacant WBA Continental light-heavyweight title.
14	Win	13–1	Michal Ludwiczak	TKO	2 (6), 2:35	27 Oct 2018	Copper Box Arena, London, England	
13	Win	12–1	Bosko Misic	KO	3 (6), 1:15	6 Jun 2018	York Hall, London, England	
12	Win	11–1	Ivan Stupalo	TKO	3 (6), 1:46	24 Mar 2018	The O2 Aren, London, England	
11	Loss	10–1	Frank Buglioni	UD	12	28 Oct 2017	Principality Stadium, Cardiff, Wales	For British light-heavyweight title.
10	Win	10–0	Norbert Szekeres	TKO	3 (6), 1:58	21 Oct 2017	The SSE Arena, Belfast, Northern Ireland	
9	Win	9–0	Rui Pavanito	PTS	6	1 Jul 2017	The O2 Arena, London, England	
8	Win	8–0	Alan Higgins	PTS	10	17 Mar 2017	York Hall, London, England	Won Southern Area super-middleweight title.
7	Win	7–0	Bronislav Kubin	TKO	2 (6), 2:50	26 Nov 2016	Wembley Arena, London, England	
6	Win	6–0	Adam Jones	PTS	6	29 Sep 2016	York Hall, London, England	
5	Win	5–0	Dalton Miller	PTS	4	10 Sep 2016	The O2 Arena, London, England	
4	Win	4–0	Richard Horton	TKO	1 (4), 2:59	21 Jun 2016	York Hall, London, England	
3	Win	3–0	Kieron Gray	PTS	4	30 Jan 2016	Copper Box Arena, London, England	
2	Win	2–0	Scott Douglas	PTS	4	10 Oct 2015	York Hall, London, England	
1	Win	1–0	James Childs	TKO	1 (4), 0:49	28 May 2015	York Hall, London, England	

Sporting positions
Regional boxing titles
Preceded by Alan Higgins	Southern Area super-middleweight champion 17 March 2017 – September 2017; Vacated	Vacant Title next held by Cello Renda
Vacant Title last held by Dominic Boesel	WBA Continental light-heavyweight champion 2 February 2019 – present	
Preceded by Shakan Pitters	British light-heavyweight champion 18 December 2020 – July 2021	Vacant Title next held by Dan Azeez
