= Chad Sugden =

British kickboxer and boxer

- Born: 27 April 1994 (age 32); Newark, Nottinghamshire, England
- Other names: 2Slick
- Nationality: British
- Height: 6 ft 0 in (183 cm)
- Division: Light-heavyweight
- Style: Orthodox
- Trainer: Dean Sugden
- Years active: 2012 – present

Professional boxing record
- Total: 16
- Wins: 12
- By knockout: 4
- Losses: 3
- Draws: 1

Kickboxing record
- Total: 18
- Wins: 14
- By knockout: 3
- Losses: 4

Other information
- Notable relatives: Bailey Sugden (brother)
- Boxing record from BoxRec

Chad Sugden (born 27 April 1994) is a British professional boxer and former kickboxer. As a boxer, he challenged for the British light-heavyweight title in 2020. As a kickboxer, he held the ISKA World and Intercontinental title at 72.5 kg.

== Amateur career ==
Sugden began his fighting career at the age of 5, alongside his younger brother Regis (4yrs), under the guidance of his father and WKA Light Middleweight World Champion Dean Sugden. During his time as an amateur Sugden collected an impressive array of accolades and gained notable media coverage as a kickboxer and boxer, often referred to as "the best in the world" and even earning a place at the WOF Asian Intercontinental games after a personal invite from the President of the Philippines.

In April 2008 Sugden travelled to Bangkok, Thailand to compete in the International Martial Arts Games where he won a Gold medal "in clinical fashion" solidifying his nickname "2Slick".

Sugden won the IKF Junior Amateur FCR Lightweight World Title on 29 November 2009 in Rochester, Kent, England when he defeated Charlie Ward by unanimous decision, 45-50, 47-48, 46-50. When Sugden turned 18 in 2012, it moved him to an adult fighter and his "JUNIOR" (8-17) title was retired.

Sugden won the IKF Junior Amateur FCR Welterweight World Title on 16 October 2010 in Kelham, England when he defeated David Lenson (USA) Staten Island, New York USA, 18-2 by unanimous decision. 50-44, 49-45, 49-45. When Sugden turned 18 in 2012, it moved him to an adult fighter and his "JUNIOR" (8-17) title was retired.

Sugden enjoyed great success as an amateur with a record of 100W-5L-0D, including a notable victory, at the age of 16, over the previously unbeaten, London based, Salah Khalifa under K-1 rules. Khalifa's calibre as an opponent and world-class fighter is verified by his Sept 2014 match up with the great Yodsanklai.

== Pro career ==
On 31 March 2012, at just 17 years old, Sugden made his professional debut on the first "Main Event" and has since fought on Enfusion, Glory and more recently in Super Fights at the K-1 World Max Final 16 in Majorca, the K-1 World Max Final 8 in Gran Canaria and the K-1 World Max Final 4 in Azerbaijan.

Sugden is the first UK fighter signed up to a long-term contract with K-1 Global and as well as being the youngest ever holder of the ISKA Professional World Title, in 2013 Peter Aerts presented Sugden with the ISKA Pro K-1 fighter of the year above many seasoned professionals.

One of the highlights of Sugden's career so far is his victory in the Fight Sport 8 Man Grand Prix in Warrington, England, where he beat Solomon Wickstead, Peter Tiarks and Kerrith Bella in one night to be crowned the UK K-1 Grand Prix 2012 8 Man Tournament Champion at 70 kg.

== Titles and accomplishments ==
=== Kickboxing ===
Professional

- International Sport Kickboxing Association
  - 2014 ISKA Oriental Rules World 72.3 kg Champion
  - 2012 ISKA K-1 Intercontinental 72.3 kg Champion
- K-1
  - UK K-1 Grand Prix 2012 8 Man Tournament Champion 70 kg max

Amateur

- Golden Belt World Champion
- 2 x IKF World Champion
- 3 x EFK titles (Commonwealth, European and World Champion)
- ISKA National and British Full Contact Kickboxing Champion
- 2 x WKA British Kickboxing Champion
- BLCC British Champion

== Professional boxing record ==
16 fights	12 wins	3 losses
By knockout	4	1
By decision	8	2
Draws	1	

No.	Result	Record	Opponent	Type	Round, time	Date	Location	Notes
16	Loss	12–3–1	(United Kingdom) Joel McIntyre	TKO	8 (10), 2:29	15 Jul 2022	(United Kingdom) Newark Showground, Newark, England	For vacant English light-heavyweight title
15	Win	12–2–1	(United Kingdom) Ossie Jervier	PTS	4 (4)	11 Dec 2021	(United Kingdom) Circus Tavern, Purfleet, England	
14	Loss	11–2–1	(United Kingdom) Shakan Pitters	UD	12	22 Aug 2020	(United Kingdom) Production Park Studios, Redditch, England	For vacant British light-heavyweight title
13	Draw	11–1–1	(United Kingdom) Craig Richards	PTS	8	19 Dec 2019	(United Kingdom) York Hall, London, England	
12	Win	11–1	(Netherlands) Farouk Daku	PTS	8	12 Oct 2019	(United Kingdom) Harvey Hadden Sports Village, Nottingham, England	
11	Win	10–1	(United Kingdom) Luke Blackledge	PTS	8	6 Jul 2019	(United Kingdom) Harvey Hadden Sports Village, Nottingham, England	
10	Win	9–1	(Iran) Taha Mirhosseini	TKO	4 (6), 2:53	22 Dec 2018	(United Kingdom) Banks's Stadium, Walsall, England	
9	Win	8–1	(Latvia) Jevgenijs Andrejevs	PTS	4	20 Oct 2018	(United Kingdom) Harvey Hadden Sports Village, Nottingham, England	
8	Win	7–1	(Bulgaria) Daniel Borisov	TKO	3 (6), 2:50	3 Nov 2017	(United Kingdom) Rockingham Forest Hotel, Corby, England	
7	Win	6–1	(Hungary) Norbert Szekeres	TKO	1 (4), 2:15	1 Sep 2017	(United Kingdom) Banks's Stadium, Walsall, England	
6	Win	5–1	(Latvia) Raimonds Sniedze	PTS	4	24 Jun 2017	(United Kingdom) Bingham Leisure Centre, Bingham, England	
5	Loss	4–1	(United Kingdom) Alistair Warren	PTS	6	15 Dec 2016	(United Kingdom) iPro Stadium, Derby, England	
4	Win	4–0	(United Kingdom) Kieron Gray	KO	3 (6), 2:29	24 Sep 2016	(United Kingdom) Walsall Town Hall, Walsall, England	
3	Win	3–0	(United Kingdom) Christian Hoskin-Gomez	PTS	6	24 Jul 2016	(United Kingdom) Chase Leisure Centre, Cannock, England	
2	Win	2–0	(Lithuania) Vaidas Balciauskas	PTS	6	14 May 2016	(United Kingdom) Banks's Stadium, Walsall, England	
1	Win	1–0	(Lithuania) Deividas Sajauka	PTS	4	19 Mar 2016	(United Kingdom) Walsall Town Hall, Walsall, England	

== Professional kickboxing record ==
Professional Kickboxing record
14 Wins (3 (T)KOs), 4 Losses
Date	Result	Opponent	Event	Location	Method	Round	Time
07.08.15	Win	(Netherlands) Murthel Groenhart	Glory 23: Las Vegas	Las Vegas, Nevada, USA	Decision (split)	3	3:00
05.23.15	Loss	(United Kingdom) Michael Wakeling	The Main Event	Birmingham, UK	Decision	3	3:00
03.04.15	Win	(Turkey) Atakan Arslan	Glory 20: Dubai	Dubai, UAE	Decision	3	3:00
07.06.14	Win	(United Kingdom) Nathan Epps	The Main Event, USN Arena	Bolton, England	Decision	3	3:00
26.04.14	Loss	(Germany) Enriko Kehl	Mix Fight Gala 15	Darmstadt, Germany	Decision	3	3:00
23.02.14	Loss	(Azerbaijan) Alim Nabiev	K-1 World max Final 4	Baku, Azerbaijan	Decision	3	3:00
11.01.14	Win	(Spain) Jorge Falcon	K-1 World MAX World Championship Tournament Quarter-final in Gran Canaria	Gran Canaria, Spain	KO	1	
01.12.13	Win	(Netherlands) Ahmed Astitou	The Lancastrian Suite	Gateshead, England	Decision	3	3:00
14.09.13	Loss	(Spain) Cristopher Mena	K-1 World MAX 2013 World Championship Tournament Final 16, reserve bout	Palma, Mallorca	Decision	3	3:00
18.05.13	Win	(Italy) Paolo Fiorio		Newark, England	Decision	5	3:00
Wins the ISKA Oriental rules World 72.5 kg title.
23.03.13	Win	(United Kingdom) Sam Wilson	Glory 5: London	London, England	Decision	3	3:00
15.12.12	Win	(Romania) Costel Pasniciuc	Pure force	Luton, England	Decision	5	3:00
Wins the ISKA Intercontinental 72.5 kg title.
28.10.12	Win	(United Kingdom) Kerrith Bhella	Fight Sport Grand Prix 70 kg MAX Tournament Final	Warrington, England	Decision	3	3:00
Wins the Fight Sport Grand Prix 70 kg MAX Tournament Championship.
28.10.12	Win	(United Kingdom) Peter Tiarks	Fight Sport Grand Prix 70 kg MAX Tournament S-Final	Warrington, England	Decision	3	3:00
28.10.12	Win	(United Kingdom) Soloman Wickstead	Fight Sport Grand Prix 70 kg MAX Tournament Q-Final	Warrington, England	Decision	3	3:00
07.07.12	Win	(United Kingdom) Jake Barton	Xplosion at the indigO2 Arena	London, England	TKO	2	
19.05.12	Win	(United Kingdom) Amar Singh	History in the Making	Newark, England	TKO	4	
31.03.12	Win	(United Kingdom) Joe Roberts	The Main Event	Manchester, England	Decision	3	3:00
Legend: Win Loss Draw/No contest Notes
