= Daniel Lapin (boxer) =

Ukrainian boxer (born 1997)

Personal information
- Born: 18 June 1997 (age 29) Wrocław, Poland
- Height: 6 ft 6 in (1.98 m)
- Weight: Light Heavyweight

Boxing career
- Reach: 78 in (198 cm)
- Stance: Southpaw

Boxing record
- Total fights: 14
- Wins: 13
- Win by KO: 5
- Losses: 1

Daniel Serhiyovych Lapin (Ukrainian: Даніель Сергійович Лапін; born 18 June 1997) is a Polish-born Ukrainian professional boxer. At regional level, he held multiple light-heavyweight championships.

== Early life ==
Lapin was born in Wrocław, Poland, and raised in Simferopol, Crimea. He was introduced to boxing by his father, boxing coach Serhiy Lapin, at the age of six.

== Amateur career ==
Following the Russian annexation of Crimea in 2014, Lapin stated that his amateur career was severely disrupted, saying that he refused to compete under the Russian flag and that the occupation "broke" his amateur development.

Lapin had a decorated amateur career with 290 bouts and won the European championships. After turning professional he became a member of Oleksandr Usyk's training team and was the inaugural signing of Usyk17 Promotions.

== Professional career ==
On the undercard of Anthony Joshua vs Oleksandr Usyk, he defeated fellow Ukrainian Pavlo Martyniuk in the opening fight on the card. He also featured on the rematch card Oleksandr Usyk vs Anthony Joshua II at the Jeddah Superdome. Once again he won on points against Slovak Jozef Jurko. On the undercard of Oleksandr Usyk vs. Daniel Dubois in his hometown Wrocław, Lapin stopped German Aro Schwarz in the sixth round to capture the vacant IBO Continental light heavyweight title. While training alongside Oleksandr Usyk in Spain during preparations for Usyk's heavyweight title bouts, Lapin described the camps as highly disciplined environments in which phones and social media were heavily restricted in order to maintain mental focus.

Lapin took part in the undisputed heavyweight title fight Tyson Fury vs. Oleksandr Usyk at the Kingdom Arena in Riyadh, Saudi Arabia. He knocked out Octavio Pudivitr in the first round.

Returning to Kingdom Arena as part of the undercard for the rematch between Usyk and Fury on 21 December 2024, Lapin defeated Dylan Colin by unanimous decision to win the vacant IBF Intercontinental light-heavyweight title.

He defended the title against Lewis Edmondson at Wembley Stadium in London, England, on 19 July 2025. Lapin won the bout via majority decision (95–95, 96–94, 96–94).

He was scheduled to face Troy Jones at Co-op Live Arena in Manchester on 1 November 2025, but withdrew from the fight due to injury.

Lapin returned to action with a first round knockout win over Kristaps Bulmeistars at Equides Club in Lisnyky, Ukraine, on 21 March 2026.

In May 2026, Lapin was announced to face Benjamin Mendes Tani as part of the undercard for the Oleksandr Usyk vs. Rico Verhoeven crossover event held on 23 May in Giza, Egypt. He was knocked to the canvas three times in the fourth round before the referee stepped in to stop the contest following the third knockdown, handing Lapin his first defeat as a professional boxer.

== Professional boxing record ==
| 14 fights | 13 wins | 1 loss |
|---|---|---|
| By knockout | 5 | 1 |
| By decision | 8 | 0 |

| No. | Result | Record | Opponent | Type | Round, time | Date | Location | Notes |
|---|---|---|---|---|---|---|---|---|
| 14 | Loss | 13–1 | Benjamin Mendes Tani | TKO | 4 (10), 1:35 | 23 May 2026 | Pyramids of Giza, Giza, Egypt | Lost IBF Inter-Continental and WBO International light heavyweight titles |
| 13 | Win | 13–0 | Kristaps Bulmeistars | KO | 1 (10), 1:07 | 21 Mar 2026 | Equides Club, Lesniki, Ukraine | |
| 12 | Win | 12–0 | Lewis Edmondson | MD | 10 | 19 Jul 2025 | Wembley Stadium, London, England | Retained WBA Continental and IBF Inter-Continental light heavyweight titles; Won vacant WBO International light heavyweight title |
| 11 | Win | 11–0 | Dylan Colin | UD | 10 | 21 Dec 2024 | Kingdom Arena, Riyadh, Saudi Arabia | Retained WBA Continental light heavyweight title; Won vacant IBF Inter-Continental light heavyweight title |
| 10 | Win | 10–0 | Octavio Pudivitr | KO | 1 (10), 1:47 | 18 May 2024 | Kingdom Arena, Riyadh, Saudi Arabia | Won vacant WBA Continental light heavyweight title |
| 9 | Win | 9–0 | Almir Skrijelj | TKO | 2 (10) | 10 Feb 2024 | Gymnasio de Rayo Vallecano, Madrid, Spain | |
| 8 | Win | 8–0 | Aro Schwartz | TKO | 6 (10), 2:25 | 28 May 2023 | Wrocław Stadium, Wrocław, Poland | Won vacant IBO Continental light heavyweight title |
| 7 | Win | 7–0 | Emmanuel Feuzeu | TKO | 1 (6), 2:35 | 15 Apr 2023 | Turów Arena, Zgorzelec, Poland | |
| 6 | Win | 6–0 | Jozef Jurko | UD | 8 | 20 Aug 2022 | Jeddah Superdome, Jeddah, Saudi Arabia | |
| 5 | Win | 5–0 | Pavlo Martyniuk | UD | 6 | 25 Sep 2021 | Tottenham Hotspur Stadium, London, England | |
| 4 | Win | 4–0 | Attila Koros | UD | 6 | 10 Apr 2021 | Kyiv, Ukraine | |
| 3 | Win | 3–0 | Beka Aduashvili | UD | 6 | 6 Mar 2021 | Akko International Kyiv, Kyiv, Ukraine | |
| 2 | Win | 2–0 | Serhiy Shevchuk | UD | 4 | 13 Dec 2020 | Oleksandr Dovzhenko National Film Studio, Kyiv, Ukraine | |
| 1 | Win | 1–0 | Siarhei Krapshyla | UD | 4 | 1 Aug 2020 | Equides Club, Lisnyky, Ukraine | |

== See also ==
- List of male boxers
