= Dillian Whyte vs. Lucas Browne =

Boxing match

- Date: 24 March 2018
- Venue: The O2 Arena, Greenwich, London, UK
- Title on the line: WBC Silver heavyweight title

Tale of the tape
| Boxer | Dillian Whyte | Lucas Browne |
| Nickname | "The Body Snatcher" | "Big Daddy" |
| Hometown | Brixton, London, UK | Auburn, New South Wales, Australia |
| Pre-fight record | 22–1 (16 KO) | 25–0 (22 KO) |
| Age | 29 years, 11 months | 38 years, 11 months |
| Height | 6 ft 4 in (193 cm) | 6 ft 5 in (196 cm) |
| Weight | 254 lb (115 kg) | 264 lb (120 kg) |
| Style | Orthodox | Orthodox |
| Recognition | WBC; No. 1 Ranked Heavyweight; IBF; No. 3 Ranked Heavyweight; WBO; No. 4 Ranked Heavyweight; WBA; No. 9 Ranked Heavyweight; The Ring/TBRB; No. 7 Ranked Heavyweight; WBC Silver heavyweight champion | WBC/WBA; No. 14 Ranked Heavyweight |

Result
- Whyte defeated Browne via 6th round KO

Dillian Whyte vs. Lucas Browne was a professional boxing match contested on 24 March 2018, for the WBC Silver heavyweight championship.

== Background ==
After scoring a wide unanimous decision victory over former 2 time European heavyweight champion Robert Helenius on the Anthony Joshua vs. Carlos Takam undercard, Dillian Whyte moved a step closer to facing WBC champion Deontay Wilder by winning the WBC Silver belt.

Lucas Browne meanwhile had returned to the ring in June 2017 following his serving of two bans after testing positive for first clenbuterol and then clenbuterol. He would express a desire to face Whyte, with whom he had a social media feud, saying about him "I just think he is an utter bigmouth. He's talked his way into a position where he is coming up to a world title fight, which is great, but I just want to punch him in the face. I really don't like him." Browne would reach "an agreement in principle" to fight WBO heavyweight champion Joseph Parker, although Parker was in negotiation with unified WBA and IBF heavyweight champion Anthony Joshua with a view for a unification bout in early 2018.

On 11 January 2018, the fight between Whyte and Browne was made, to take place at The O2 Arena in London on 24 March. Speaking of the fight, Whyte said, "I can't wait, I hate Lucas Browne and I want to hurt him. He's said some nasty things and he's going to have to pay for them."

== Fight details ==
Browne left himself open most of the time and tried switching stances after a few rounds. Browne suffered a cut over his left eye in round three, which got worse with each round. Whyte then bloodied Browne's nose in round five. Browne's face was cut and badly swollen from the clean shots landed from Whyte. Whyte hit Browne with a hard left hook to the head in the round six to knock him unconscious, winning the fight. There was no count made and the fight was waved off immediately with ringside doctors attending to Browne before giving him oxygen. The fight was officially stopped at 37 seconds of the round.

== Aftermath ==
After the fight, Browne was stretchered from the ring and taken to a nearby hospital for precaution. In the post-fight interview, Whyte called out WBC champion Deontay Wilder for a fight in June 2018. Promoter Eddie Hearn said, "I hope the WBC make Dillian mandatory now, the fight is there for Deontay Wilder in June. We have to force the shot and after that performance, he deserves the shot." Hearn stated there could be a possibility that the WBC order a final eliminator between Whyte and Dominic Breazeale. At the same time the IBF ordered Whyte to fight former world title challenger Kubrat Pulev in a final eliminator bout.

== Fight card ==
Confirmed bouts:

| Weight Class | | vs. | | Method | Round | Time | Notes |
|---|---|---|---|---|---|---|---|
| Heavyweight | Dillian Whyte (c) | def. | Lucas Browne | KO | 6/12 | 0:37 | ^{Note 1} |
| Welterweight | Chris Kongo | def. | Serge Ambomo | PTS | 6/6 |
| Light-heavyweight | Callum Johnson (c) | def. | Frank Buglioni (c) | TKO | 1/12 | 1:31 | ^{Note 2} |
| Lightweight | Lewis Ritson (c) | def. | Scott Cardle | TKO | 2/12 | 2:05 | ^{Note 3} |
| Light-middleweight | Anthony Fowler | def. | Kalilou Dembele | TKO | 5/6 | 0:22 |
| Heavyweight | Derek Chisora | def. | Zakaria Azzouzi | TKO | 2/8 | 2:12 |
Preliminary bouts
| Super-middleweight | Jamie Cox | def. | Harry Matthews | KO | 2/6 | 2:04 |
| Light-heavyweight | Craig Richards | def. | Ivan Stupalo | TKO | 3/6 | 1:46 |
Non-TV bouts
| Cruiserweight | Richard Riakporhe | def. | Adam Williams | TKO | 3/4 | 2:38 |
| Featherweight | Louie Lynn | def. | Michael Horabin | TKO | 2/4 | 2:19 |

^Note 1 For WBC Silver heavyweight title
^Note 2 For British and Commonwealth light-heavyweight titles
^Note 3 For British lightweight title

== Broadcasting ==
| Country | Broadcaster |
|---|---|
| United Kingdom | Sky Sports |
| Australia | Main Event |
| Panama | Cable Onda Sports |
| United States | HBO |

| Preceded by vs. Robert Helenius | Dillian Whyte's bouts 24 March 2018 | Succeeded by vs. Joseph Parker |
| Preceded by vs. Matthew Greer | Lucas Browne's bouts 24 March 2018 | Succeeded by vs. Julius Long |
