= Amer Khan =

Amer Khan may refer to:

- Amer Khan (boxer) (born 1981), English light heavyweight boxer
- Amer Khan (footballer, born 1983), Lebanese former association footballer who played as a midfielder
- Amer Khan (footballer, born 1971), Bangladeshi footballer and manager

== See also ==
- Amir Khan (disambiguation)
