= Chic Calderwood =

Scottish boxer (1937–1966)

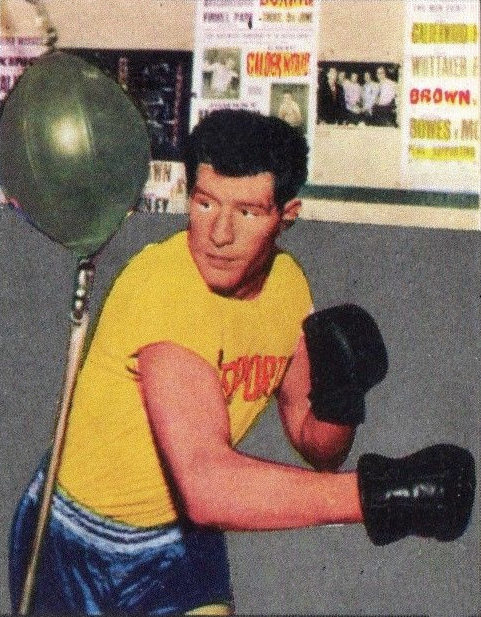

Personal information
- Nationality: British
- Born: Charles Calderwood; 1 September 1937 Craigneuk, Scotland
- Died: 12 November 1966 (aged 29) Scotland
- Weight: Light Heavyweight

Boxing career

Boxing record
- Total fights: 55
- Wins: 44
- Win by KO: 29
- Losses: 9
- Draws: 1
- No contests: 1

Chic Calderwood (1 September 1937 – 12 November 1966) was a Scottish light-heavyweight boxer from Craigneuk in North Lanarkshire, Scotland who was active from 1957 to 1966. He was 6 ft. 3 in. tall and won many of his fights by knockouts. His career was cut short when he was killed in an automobile accident.

== Amateur career ==
He compiled an amateur boxing record of 64 wins and 6 defeats.

== Professional career ==
He had his first professional fight in September 1957 when he fought Jimmy Teasdale in Falkirk, winning by a knockout in the second round.

Over the next two years he built up a record of 23 straight wins, 17 of them by knockout. In January 1960 he fought for the vacant British light-heavyweight title, vacated by Randolph Turpin. The fight, against Arthur Howard, was held in Paisley, Scotland, and Calderwood won by a technical knockout in the thirteenth round. He was the first Scottish boxer to hold the British light-heavyweight title.

In his next fight, in June 1960, he met the Tongan, John Halafihi at Firhill Park, Glasgow, for the Commonwealth light-heavyweight title. Calderwood won by a technical knockout in the twelfth, to gain his second title.

Calderwood continued his winning record and in September 1960 he gained a ten-round points victory over American, Willie Pastrano, later to become world light-heavyweight champion. The fight, over ten rounds was at the Kelvin Hall, Glasgow.

After building up a record of 29 straight wins, he lost his first fight in March 1961 when he was beaten on points over ten rounds by the American, Von Clay, at the Empire Pool, Wembley. In December 1961, he suffered a second points defeat, against the American, Henry Hank, in Detroit.

In February 1962 he defended both his titles against Stan Cullis, winning by a knockout in the fourth round.

In June 1962 he had a re-match against John Halafihi for his Commonwealth title, beating him on points over fifteen rounds at Newcastle upon Tyne.

In his next fight, in September 1962, he fought for the European light-heavyweight title, against the holder Giulio Rinaldi. The fight was held in Rome and ended with a fifteen-round points victory for the Italian.

In July 1963, he fought in Blackpool, defending his British and Commonwealth titles against Ron Redrup. Calderwood retained his tiles when Redrup retired at the end of the eleventh round with a badly cut eye.

Later in 1963, Calderwood was charged with assaulting a labourer from Selkirk and was sentenced to three months' imprisonment. As a result, he was stripped of his titles in November 1963.

In November 1964, he regained his British title in Paisley by beating Bob Nicholson, by a knockout in the seventh round.

In August 1966, he again challenged for the European light-heavyweight title, this time against another Italian, Piero Del Papa. The fight was held in Lignano, Italy, and was declared no contest after six rounds because of heavy rain.

By now Calderwood's record had earned him a shot at the World title, and in October 1966, he fought the WBA and WBC light-heavyweight champion José Torres, in San Juan, Puerto Rico. Calderwood was knocked out in the second round of, what proved to be, his last fight.

A month later, on 12 November 1966, he was killed in an automobile accident in Scotland.

== See also ==
- List of British light-heavyweight boxing champions
- List of Commonwealth Boxing Council Champions
