= Dan Azeez =

British boxer (born 1989)

Personal information
- Nickname: Super
- Born: 30 August 1989 (age 37) London, England
- Height: 5 ft 10 in (178 cm)
- Weight: Light-heavyweight

Boxing career
- Stance: Orthodox

Boxing record
- Total fights: 27
- Wins: 23
- Win by KO: 14
- Losses: 3
- Draws: 1

Dan Azeez (born 30 August 1989) is a British professional boxer. He has held the British, Commonwealth and European light-heavyweight titles. He is the first and only British light-heavyweight to capture all British Boxing Board of Control domestic titles.

== Amateur career ==
Azeez started boxing as an amateur competitively while studying at Essex University where he got a degree in Accounting and Finance. He boxed under the tutelage of Gordon Charlesworth at the Colchester-based amateur boxing club. Dan had over 60 contests and was crowned ABA South of England champion three times. Azeez won the prestigious Box Cup tournament in 2013 at London's Alexandra Palace.

== Professional career ==
In December 2017, Azeez made his professional debut against Daniel Borisov at the Brentwood Centre in Essex, scoring two knock downs on the way to a dominant points decision.

On 20 July 2019 after eight fights, Dan Azeez challenged for the vacant Southern Area title on the Dillian Whyte vs Oscar Rivas undercard live on Sky Sports at The O2 Arena against fellow Londoner Charlie Duffield. Azeez dominated from the first round causing swelling under Duffield's left eye which only got worse as the rounds continued. After a number of right hands delivered from Azeez in the sixth round, the referee stopped the bout while Duffield's corner threw in the towel. On 14 December 2019 Dan outpointed the previously unbeaten Lawrence Osueke over ten rounds at the Brentwood Centre to claim the vacant English title.

After successfully defending the English title twice, Azeez got another chance to step on to the big platform as his clash with Hosea Burton for the vacant British light-heavyweight title was to be shown live on Sky Sports. On 20 November 2021 Azeez put on an impressive performance and blasted Burton to a halt in the seventh round to become the new British light-heavyweight champion at The SSE Arena, Wembley. Azeez dominated the fight with his unrelenting aggression from the first round. After a huge left hand, Azeez trapped Burton in the corner with a vicious barrage of punches to force the referee's intervention.

He defended his title against Shakan Pitters at M&S Bank Arena in Liverpool, winning by unanimous decision on 3 September 2022 and then stopped Rocky Fielding in the eighth round at Bournemouth International Centre on 17 December 2022 to retain his championship and add the vacant Commonwealth light-heavyweight title to his collection.

On 11 March 2023, Azeez win the vacant European light-heavyweight title with a 12th round technical knockout success over Thomas Faure in Paris, France.

After vacating the European title without making any defenses, he lost his British and Commonwealth belts to Joshua Buatsi at Wembley Arena in London on 3 February 2024, going down via unanimous decision.

In his next contest, Azeez drew with Hrvoje Sep over eight rounds at Selhurst Park in London on 15 June 2024.

He fought Lewis Edmondson for the vacant British and Commonwealth light-heavyweight titles at the Copper Box Arena in London on 19 October 2024, losing by majority decision.

Azeez faced Craig Richards at Legon Sports Stadium in Accra, Ghana, on 20 December 2025. He lost by stoppage in the final round of the fight for the vacant IBF International light-heavyweight title.

== Professional boxing record ==
27 fights	23 wins	3 losses
By knockout	14	1
By decision	9	2
Draws	1	

No.	Result	Record	Opponent	Type	Round, time	Date	Location	Notes
27	Win	23–3–1	Grant Dennis	PTS	6	18 Jul 2026	Harrow Leisure Centre, London, England	
26	Loss	22–3–1	Craig Richards	KO	12 (12), 0:23	20 Dec 2025	Legon Sports Stadium, Accra, Ghana	For vacant IBF International light-heavyweight title
25	Win	22–2–1	Sulaimon Adeosun	TKO	4 (6), 1:54	1 Oct 2025	Mobolaji Johnson Arena, Onikan, Lagos Nigeria	
24	Win	21–2–1	Bahadur Karami	PTS	6	24 Apr 2025	Radisson Blu Hotel, Glasgow, Scotland	
23	Loss	20–2–1	Lewis Edmondson	MD	12	18 Oct 2024	Copper Box Arena, London, England	For the vacant British and Commonwealth light-heavyweight titles
22	Draw	20–1–1	Hrvoje Sep	PTS	8	15 Jun 2024	Selhurst Park, London, England	
21	Loss	20–1	Joshua Buatsi	UD	12	3 Feb 2024	OVO Arena, London, England	Lost British and Commonwealth light-heavyweight titles
20	Win	20–0	Khalid Graidia	PTS	8	15 Jul 2023	Teatro Maggiore, Verbania, Italy	
19	Win	19–0	Thomas Faure	TKO	12 (12)	11 Mar 2023	Zénith Paris, Paris, France	Won vacant European light-heavyweight title
18	Win	18–0	Rocky Fielding	TKO	8 (12), 2:05	17 Dec 2022	Bournemouth International Centre, Bournemouth, England	Retained British light-heavyweight title; Won vacant Commonwealth light-heavyweight title
17	Win	17–0	Shakan Pitters	UD	12	3 Sep 2022	M&S Bank Arena, Liverpool, England	Retained British light-heavyweight title
16	Win	16–0	Reece Cartwright	TKO	8 (10), 1:32	26 Mar 2022	Wembley Arena, England	
15	Win	15–0	Hosea Burton	TKO	7 (12), 2:27	20 Nov 2021	The SSE Arena, Wembley, England	Won vacant British light-heavyweight title
14	Win	14–0	Ivo Zednicek	KO	3 (6), 2:05	25 Sep 2021	Corn Exchange, Bedford, England	
13	Win	13–0	Ricky Summers	SD	10	17 Apr 2021	Bolton Whites Hotel, Bolton, England	Retained English light-heavyweight title
12	Win	12–0	Andre Sterling	TKO	9 (10), 1:59	2 Sep 2020	Production Park Studios, South Kirkby, England	Retained English light-heavyweight title
11	Win	11–0	Lawrence Osueke	PTS	10	14 Dec 2019	Brentwood Centre, Brentwood, England	Won vacant English light-heavyweight title
10	Win	10–0	Edgars Sniedze	TKO	5 (6), 1:21	9 Nov 2019	York Hall, London, England	
9	Win	9–0	Charlie Duffield	TKO	6 (10), 2:49	20 Jul 2019	The O2 Arena, London, England	Won vacant Southern Area light-heavyweight title
8	Win	8–0	Josip Perkovic	TKO	4 (8), 3:00	26 Apr 2019	York Hall, London, England	
7	Win	7–0	Stanislav Eschner	TKO	5 (6), 1:58	22 Feb 2019	York Hall, London, England	
6	Win	6–0	Charles Adamu	PTS	6	26 Oct 2018	York Hall, London, England	
5	Win	5–0	Adam Jones	PTS	4	13 Jul 2018	York Hall, London, England	
4	Win	4–0	Jevgenijs Andrejevs	TKO	1 (4), 2:49	26 May 2018	The Corn Exchange, Ipswich, England	
3	Win	3–0	Richard Harrison	TKO	3 (4), 1:26	28 Apr 2018	Brentwood Centre, Brentwood, England	
2	Win	2–0	Craig Nicholson	TKO	4 (4), 1:52	3 Mar 2018	Brentwood Centre, Brentwood, England	
1	Win	1–0	Daniel Borisov	PTS	4	2 Dec 2017	Brentwood Centre, Brentwood, England	

Sporting positions
Regional boxing titles
Vacant Title last held by Andre Sterling	Southern Area light-heavyweight champion 20 July 2019 – December 2019; Vacated	Vacant Title next held by Pawel August
Vacant Title last held by Shakan Pitters	English light-heavyweight champion 14 December 2019 – 20 November 2022; Vacated	Vacant Title next held by Joel McIntyre
Vacant Title last held by Craig Richards	British light-heavyweight champion 20 November 2021 – 3 February 2024	Succeeded by Joshua Buatsi
Vacant Title last held by Anthony Yarde	Commonwealth light-heavyweight champion 17 December 2022 – 3 February 2024	Succeeded by Joshua Buatsi
