= Mir Ahmed Nasrallah Thattvi =

Muslim scholar of Pakistan

- میر احمد نصراللہ ٹھٹوی
- Born: Thatta, Sindh
- Died: 1588
- Occupations: Scholar, Writer
- Writing career
- Language: Persian, Arabic, Turkish, Sindhi
- Notable work: Tarih-i Alfi

Mir Ahmed Nasrallah Thattvi (died 1588) was born in Thatta, Sindh. He was among the renowned and widely traveled Muslim scholars at the court of Mughal Emperor Akbar. He was the son of a Qazi (Kazi) in Thatta. During his early life he was in a devoted pursuit of higher education and spiritual improvement, he traveled as a young man both to important centers of learning, particularly in Safavid Iran, and the Ottoman ruled cities of Mecca, Medina, and Jerusalem. He is known to have spoken four languages: Sindhi, Turkish, Persian, Arabic.

Upon his return to the Mughal realm he was received favorably by Akbar. When the Mughal Emperor commissioned a group of scholars to compose a work on the first 1000 years of Islam, Tattavi emerged as the chief author of the work. The work was entitled Tarih-i Alfi. His main contributions to the works was the chapters beginning from the 36th year after the death of the Islamic prophet Muhammad to the time of Ghazan (d.704 AH/1304 AD). However, Tattavi never saw the work completed he died in (996 AH/1588 AD) upon the emergence of prince Jahangir. Among his students was the future Mughal Subedar of Sindh, Amir Khan I.

== See also ==
- Mughal Empire
- Akbar
- Sindh
