= Radivoje Kalajdzic =

Serbian boxer (born 1991)

Personal information
- Nickname: Hot Rod
- Nationality: American
- Born: Radivoje Kalajdžić; 27 July 1991 (age 35) Zenica, SFR Yugoslavia (now Bosnia and Herzegovina)
- Height: 188 cm (6 ft 2 in)
- Weight: Cruiserweight; Light-heavyweight

Boxing career
- Reach: 1.93 m (76 in)
- Stance: Orthodox

Boxing record
- Total fights: 34
- Wins: 31
- Win by KO: 22
- Losses: 3

Radivoje Kalajdzic (born 27 July 1991) is an American professional boxer. He has challenged for the world light-heavyweight championship two times; for IBF in 2019 & for vacant WBA (Regular) in 2024.

== Career ==
Kalajdzic turned professional in 2011. On 18 October 2013, he stopped light heavyweight Otis Griffin in the first round. Kalajdzic lost a highly controversial decision to Marcus Browne on 16 April 2016 fight for the WBC United States title, which broke his undefeated streak. He was officially the IBU Champion in 2014. His three-second knockout of Fabio Garrido on 13 November 2015 was met with criticism.

On 4 May 2019, Kalajdzic challenged IBF light-heavyweight champion Artur Beterbiev at Stockton Arena in Stockton, California, USA, losing by knockout in the fifth round.

Kalajdzic was scheduled to face David Morell for the vacant WBA "Regular" light heavyweight title at BMO Stadium in Los Angeles, California, USA, on 3 August 2024. He lost the fight by unanimous decision.

On 1 February 2026, Kalajdzic fought Oleksandr Gvozdyk at Meta Apex in Enterprise, Nevada, USA. He recovered from being sent to the canvas in rounds one and four to win by knockout in the seventh round.

On 26 September 2026, he fought Craig Richards over 10 rounds at the Copper Box Arena in London, England, as part of Zuffa Boxing 11. Kalajdzic knocked his opponent to the canvas in the final round and won via unanimous decision.

== Personal life ==
Born in Zenica, SR Bosnia and Herzegovina (at the time SFR Yugoslavia), his family fled the Bosnian War in 1992 first to Bijeljina in Republika Srpska and then moved to Čačak in Serbia, and after 7 years as refugees they moved to the United States, to Saint Petersburg, Florida in 1998. His father Marko trained boxing in his youth, and at 14 years he started boxing at a Florida gym. He wears the Serbian tricolour and "SRB" on his shorts. He is a devout believer in Jesus Christ and he wears tattoos of Eastern Orthodox iconography.

== Professional boxing record ==
34 fights	31 wins	3 losses
By knockout	22	1
By decision	9	2

No.	Result	Record	Opponent	Type	Round, time	Date	Location	Notes
34	Win	31–3	Craig Richards	UD	10	26 Sep 2026	Copper Box Arena, London, England	
33	Win	30–3	Oleksandr Gvozdyk	KO	7 (10), 2:47	1 Feb 2026	Meta Apex, Enterprise, Nevada, U.S.	Performance of the Night
32	Loss	29–3	David Morrell	UD	12	3 Aug 2024	BMO Stadium, Los Angeles, California, U.S.	For vacant WBA (Regular) light-heavyweight title
31	Win	29–2	Sullivan Barrera	TKO	10 (10), 2:31	14 Mar 2024	Probox Event Arena, USA	
30	Win	28–2	Mickey Ellison	TKO	8 (10), 1:35	6 Sep 2023	Whitesands Events Center, Plant City, Florida, USA	
29	Win	27–2	Ernest Amuzu	TKO	1 (8), 2:16	14 May 2022	Yuengling Center, Tampa, Florida, USA	
28	Win	26–2	Guillermo Ruben Andino	TKO	2 (8), 2:09	18 Dec 2021	Estadio Jesus Capi Correa, San Miguel de Allende, Mexico	
27	Win	25–2	Denis Grachev	UD	8	21 Nov 2020	Bryan Glazer Family JCC, Tampa, Florida, USA	
26	Loss	24–2	Artur Beterbiev	KO	5 (12), 0:13	4 May 2019	Stockton Arena, Stockton, California, USA	For IBF light-heavyweight title
25	Win	24–1	Alex Theran	KO	1 (8), 1:11	10 Oct 2018	Bryan Glazer Family JCC, Tampa, Florida, USA	
24	Win	23–1	Brad Austin	TKO	1 (8), 2:45	21 Jul 2018	Florida State Fairgrounds, Tampa, Florida, USA	
23	Win	22–1	Travis Peterkin	TKO	5 (10), 1:32	23 Sep 2016	Buffalo Run Casino, Miami, Oklahoma, USA	
22	Lose	21–1	Marcus Browne	SD	8	16 Apr 2016	Barclays Center, New York City, New York, USA	For WBC–USNBC light-heavyweight title
21	Win	21–0	Fabio Garrido	KO	1 (8)	13 Nov 2015	Beau Rivage Resort & Casino, Biloxi, USA	
20	Win	20–0	Gilberto Matheus Domingos	TKO	1 (8), 1:32	10 Oct 2015	Florida Orange Event Center, Lakeland, Florida, USA	
19	Win	19–0	William Johnson	UD	6	2 May 2015	Hard Rock Casino, Biloxi, Mississippi, USA	
18	Win	18–0	Larry Pryor	TKO	4 (8), 1:53	13 Mar 2015	A La Carte Event Pavilion, Tampa, Florida, USA	
17	Win	17–0	Rayco Saunders	UD	6	3 Oct 2014	A La Carte Event Pavilion, Tampa, Florida, USA	
16	Win	16–0	Lionell Thompson	SD	8	29 Mar 2014	The Ballroom, Boardwalk Hall, Atlantic City, New Jersey, USA	
15	Win	15–0	Samson Onyango	KO	1 (8)	14 Feb 2014	Doubletree Westshore Hotel, Tampa, Florida, USA	
14	Win	14–0	Charles Hayward	TKO	1 (8), 1:33	23 Nov 2013	Jefferson High School, Tampa, Florida, USA	
13	Win	13–0	Otis Griffin	TKO	1 (10), 1:49	18 Oct 2013	Doubletree Westshore Hotel, Tampa, Florida, USA	
12	Win	12–0	Donta Woods	TKO	2 (6), 2:49	12 Jul 2013	A La Carte Event Pavilion, Tampa, Florida, USA	
11	Win	11–0	Dennis Sharpe	KO	1 (6), 1:16	27 Apr 2013	Benton Convention Center, Winston-Salem, North Carolina, USA	
10	Win	10–0	Grover Young	UD	6	4 Jan 2013	Magic City Casino, Miami, Florida, USA	
9	Win	9–0	Sabou Ballogou	TKO	3 (6), 2:29	9 Nov 2012	A La Carte Event Pavilion, Tampa, Florida, USA	
8	Win	8–0	Shannon Anderson	KO	1 (6), 1:36	14 Sep 2012	A La Carte Event Pavilion, Tampa, Florida, USA	
7	Win	7–0	Jerrod Caldwell	TKO	1 (6), 1:49	18 Aug 2012	Doubletree Miamimart Hotel, Miami, Florida, USA	
6	Win	6–0	Mark Sanders	UD	6	1 Jun 2012	A La Carte Event Pavilion, Tampa, Florida, USA	
5	Win	5–0	Eliseo Durazo	UD	4	10 Feb 2012	A La Carte Event Pavilion, Tampa, Florida, USA	
4	Win	4–0	Percey Givens	TKO	1 (4), 2:08	7 Jan 2012	Westin Diplomat Resort, Hollywood, Florida, USA	
3	Win	3–0	Richmond Dalphone	TKO	3 (4), 2:35	18 Nov 2011	Miami Airport Convention Center, Miami, Florida, USA	
2	Win	2–0	Marlon Farr	KO	1 (4), 1:30	9 Sep 2011	A La Carte Event Pavilion, Tampa, Florida, USA	
1	Win	1–0	Nyantu Bolo	KO	1 (4), 0:34	3 Jun 2011	A La Carte Event Pavilion, Tampa, Florida, USA	
