= Tony Yoka vs Carlos Takam =

Boxing competition

- Date: 11 March 2023
- Venue: Accor Arena, Paris, France

Tale of the tape
Boxer	Tony Yoka	Carlos Takam
Nickname	The Artist	
Hometown	Paris, France	Douala, Cameroon
Pre-fight record	11–1 (9 KO)	39–7–0 (28 KO)
Age	30	42
Height	6 ft 7 in (201 cm)	6 ft 1+1/2 in
Weight	109 kg (240 lb)	248 lb (112 kg)
Style	Orthodox	Orthodox

Result
- Takam wins via 10-round split decision

Tony Yoka vs Carlos Takam was a professional boxing match contested between French boxer, Tony Yoka, and French-Cameroonian boxer, Carlos Takam.

The battle took place on March 11, 2023, at the Accor Arena in Paris, France. This marked the first time the two had faced each other

== Background ==
Yoka was expected to face Carlos Takam on January 15, 2022, in a fight which was supposed to take place at the Accor Arena in Paris, France. Shortly after the bout was scheduled however, Takam withdrew due to injury. On December 10, 2021, it was announced that Martin Bakole would step in as Takam's replacement. The fight was postponed on December 28, 2021, due to measures imposed to combat the spread of COVID-19. Yoka instead chose to enter negotiations to face Filip Hrgović in an IBF title eliminator. The IBF later ruled Yoka ineligible to enter an agreement with any opponent other than Martin Bakole, as the two had already signed contracts to face each other. Yoka's fight with Bakole was rescheduled for May 14. He lost the fight by majority decision, after suffering two knockdowns, in the first and fifth rounds.

== Fight card ==
Weight Class		vs.		Method	Round	Time	Notes
Heavyweight	Carlos Takam	def.	Tony Yoka	SD	(10)
Light Heavyweight	Dan Azeez	def.	Thomas Faure	TKO	(12)		EBU European Light Heavy (vacant)
Super Middleweight	Farhadd Sadd	draw.	Macaulay McGowan	MD	(8)
Light Heavyweight	Lauren Price	def.	Naomi Mannez	UD	(8x2)
Middleweight	Victor Yoka	def.	Branislav Malinovic	UD	(6)
Middleweight	Lyad Tormos	def.	Goga Kevlishvili	MD	(4)
