= Willy Hutchinson =

Scottish boxer (born 1998)

Personal information
- Nicknames: Braveheart; The Hutch Train; Wee Willy
- Born: 4 August 1998 (age 28) Carstairs, Scotland
- Height: 6 ft 1 in (185 cm)
- Weight: Super-middleweight; Light-heavyweight

Boxing career
- Reach: 73 in (185 cm)
- Stance: Orthodox

Boxing record
- Total fights: 23
- Wins: 21
- Win by KO: 14
- Losses: 2
Medal record
Men's amateur boxing
Representing Scotland
Youth World Championships
Gold medal – first place	2016 St. Petersburg	Middleweight

William Hutchinson (born 4 August 1998) is a Scottish professional boxer. He has held the World Boxing Council (WBC) light-heavyweight title since November 2026. He also challenged for the British and Commonwealth super-middleweight titles in 2021. As an amateur, he won a gold medal at the 2016 Youth World Championships in the middleweight division.

== Amateur career ==
Hutchinson is regarded as one of Scotland's most successful amateur boxers, winning gold medals at the 2014 European Junior Championships and 2016 Youth World Championships—becoming the first Scottish boxer to win gold at an amateur World Championships.

== Professional career ==
Under the tutelage of renowned Cuban trainer, Ismael Salas, and being guided by David Haye's RingStar Promotions with Shelly Finkel as manager, Hutchinson made his professional debut on 20 October 2017, scoring a first-round technical knockout (TKO) victory against Attila Nagy at the indigo at The O2 in London.

He scored another TKO victory in December—defeating Cyrille Joly in the second round—followed by a six-round points decision (PTS) victory against Eric Mokonzo in February 2018. After his win over Mokonzo, Hutchinson switched trainers from Salas to Dominic Ingle.

In the following May it was announced that Hutchinson had also switched promoters, signing with Frank Warren's Queensberry Promotions.

Hutchinson fought Joshua Buatsi for the WBO interim light-heavyweight title at Wembley Stadium on the undercard of Anthony Joshua vs Daniel Dubois on 21 September 2024. He was twice knocked to the canvas before losing the contest via split decision with two ringside judges scoring the fight in favour of his opponent 117–108 and 115–110 respectively, while the third had it in his favour 113–112.

He got back to winning ways in his next fight, stopping Mark Jeffers in the seventh of their scheduled 10-round contest at the Braehead Arena in Glasgow on 4 October 2025.

Hutchinson defeated Ezra Taylor by unanimous decision at Co-op Live in Manchester on 26 March 2026.

=== WBC light-heavyweight champion ===
==== Hutchinson vs. Buatsi II ====
On 7 November 2026 at the AO Arena in Manchester, Hutchinson faced Joshua Buatsi for the vacant WBC light-heavyweight title. Hutchinson defeated Buatsi by unanimous decision, with scorecards of 117–112, 115–113, and 115–113, to win the title and avenge his loss to Buatsi in 2024.

== Professional boxing record ==
23 fights	21 wins	2 losses
By knockout	14	1
By decision	7	1

No.	Result	Record	Opponent	Type	Round, time	Date	Location	Notes
23	Win	21–2	Joshua Buatsi	UD	12	7 Nov 2026	Manchester Arena, Manchester, England	Won vacant WBC light-heavyweight title
22	Win	20–2	Ezra Taylor	UD	10	28 Mar 2026	Co-op Live, Manchester, England	Won vacant WBA Continental and WBO Global light-heavyweight titles
21	Win	19–2	Mark Jeffers	TKO	7 (10), 2:15	4 Oct 2025	Braehead Arena, Glasgow, Scotland	
20	Loss	18–2	Joshua Buatsi	SD	12	21 Sep 2024	Wembley Stadium, London, England	For WBO interim light-heavyweight title
19	Win	18–1	Craig Richards	UD	12	1 June 2024	Kingdom Arena, Riyadh, Saudi Arabia	Won vacant WBC Silver light-heavyweight title
18	Win	17–1	Martin Houben	TKO	2 (10), 2:32	22 March 2024	York Hall, London, England	Retained WBC International light-heavyweight title
17	Win	16–1	Ezequiel Maderna	KO	4 (10), 1:15	12 May 2023	York Hall, London, England	Won WBC International light-heavyweight title
16	Win	15–1	Luca Spadicini	TKO	7 (10), 1:26	11 Nov 2022	York Hall, London, England	
15	Win	14–1	Karel Horejsek	RTD	3 (8), 3:00	11 Jun 2022	Telford International Centre, Telford, England	
14	Loss	13–1	Lennox Clarke	TKO	5 (12), 1:05	27 Mar 2021	Copper Box Arena, London, England	For vacant British and Commonwealth super-middleweight titles
13	Win	13–0	Jose Miguel Fandino	TKO	1 (10), 2:49	10 Oct 2020	BT Sport Studio, London, England	
12	Win	12–0	Ben Thomas	TKO	1 (10), 2:09	28 Aug 2020	BT Sport Studio, London, England	
11	Win	11–0	Edgars Sniedze	PTS	6	22 Feb 2020	York Hall, London, England	
10	Win	10–0	Borislav Zankov	TKO	2 (8), 2:15	27 Sep 2019	Royal Albert Hall, London, England	
9	Win	9–0	Josip Perkovic	PTS	6	13 Jul 2019	The O2 Arena, London, England	
8	Win	8–0	Ondrej Budera	TKO	3 (6), 2:41	18 May 2019	Lamex Stadium, Stevenage, England	
7	Win	7–0	Daniel Borisov	TKO	4 (4), 0:40	23 Mar 2019	Leicester Arena, Leicester, England	
6	Win	6–0	Ferenc Albert	TKO	2 (6), 1:42	19 Nov 2018	Hilton Hotel, London, England	
5	Win	5–0	Taha Mirhosseini	TKO	3 (6), 1:01	24 Aug 2018	Emirates Arena, Glasgow, Scotland	
4	Win	4–0	Adam Jones	PTS	4	19 May 2018	Elland Road, Leeds, England	
3	Win	3–0	Eric Mokonzo	PTS	6	16 Feb 2018	York Hall, London, England	
2	Win	2–0	Cyrille Joly	TKO	2 (6), 0:57	16 Dec 2017	La Seine Musicale, Paris, France	
1	Win	1–0	Attila Nagy	TKO	1 (4), 1:29	20 Oct 2017	indigo at The O2, London, England	

Sporting positions
Regional boxing titles
Vacant Title last held by Mate Kis	WBO Global light-heavyweight champion 28 March – 2026; Vacated	Vacant
World boxing titles
Vacant Title last held by David Benavidez	WBC light-heavyweight champion 7 November 2026 – present	Incumbent
