= Shakan Pitters =

English boxer (born 1989)

Personal information
- Born: 31 July 1989 (age 36) Birmingham, England
- Height: 6 ft 6 in (198 cm)
- Weight: Light-heavyweight; Cruiserweight

Boxing career
- Stance: Orthodox

Boxing record
- Total fights: 24
- Wins: 21
- Win by KO: 7
- Losses: 3

Shakan Pitters (born 31 July 1989) is an English professional boxer who held the British light-heavyweight title in 2020. He was also English light-heavyweight champion in 2019.

== Professional career ==
Pitters made his professional debut on 18 March 2017 as a cruiserweight, scoring a four-round points decision (PTS) victory over Remigijus Ziausys at the Holte Suite in Villa Park, Birmingham. he secured three more PTS victories in 2017; Over Jevgenijs Andrejevs in June; Dmitrij Kalinovskij in September; and Jiri Svacina in November.

He began 2018 with a PTS win over Elvis Dube in March, followed by stoppage wins over Kent Kauppinen in May and Imantas Davidaitis in September. In August, Pitters was announced as a contestant in the second edition of the Ultimate Boxxer tournament. The eight-man tournament was contested over 3 rounds, taking place on 2 November at the indigo at The O2 in London. Pitters' first fight of the night came against Sam Smith, winning by unanimous decision (UD), with two judges scoring the bout 30–25 and the third scoring it 29–26. Next up he defeated Georgii Bacon via second-round knockout (KO). His final fight of the night was a UD win against Dec Spelman with scores of 30–26 twice and 29–27, becoming the Ultimate Boxxer II champion.

Following his success in the Ultimate Boxxer, Pitters kicked off 2019 with a first-round KO victory against Norbert Szekeres in March and a six-round PTS win against Dmitrij Kalinovskij in May. His final fight of 2019 was a rematch against newly crowned English light-heavyweight champion Dec Spelman. The bout took place on 14 September 2019 at the York Hall in London, with Pitters defeating Spelman via UD over ten rounds to capture his first professional title. All three judges scored the bout 97–92.

Pitters won the vacant British light-heavyweight title with a unanimous decision success over Chad Sugden at Production Park Studios in Redditch on 22 August 2020.

He made the first defense of the title against Craig Richards at Fly By Nite Rehearsal Studios in Redditch on 18 December 2020, losing by technical knockout in the ninth round.

On 3 September 2022, Pitters attempted to regain the British light-heavyweight title when he challenging champion Dan Azeez at M&S Bank Arena in Liverpool, but lost via unanimous decision.

Pitters was due to challenge European light-heavyweight champion Daniel Blenda Dos Santos at Park Community Arena in Sheffield on 7 February 2025, but the fight was postponed when Dos Santos failed a brain scan. It was rescheduled to take place at York Hall in London on 4 April 2025, however, Pitters suffered an injury in training camp and the contest was cancelled.

He faced Bradley Rea for the vacant European light-heavyweight title at Connexin Live Arena in Hull on 28 June 2025, losing by unanimous decision.

== Professional boxing record ==
24 fights	21 wins	3 losses
By knockout	7	1
By decision	14	2

No.	Result	Record	Opponent	Type	Round, time	Date	Location	Notes
24	Win	21–3	Robbie Chapman	PTS	4	23 May 2026	Chase Leisure Centre, Cannock, England	
23	Loss	20–3	Bradley Rea	UD	12	28 Jun 2025	Connexin Live Arena, Hull, England	For the vacant European light-heavyweight title
22	Win	20–2	Bahadur Karami	TKO	2 (6), 2:13	7 Feb 2025	Park Community Arena, Sheffield, England	
21	Win	19–2	Darryl Sharp	PTS	6	28 Sep 2023	The Premier Suite, Cannock, England	
20	Win	18–2	Joel McIntyre	PTS	8	6 May 2023	Resorts World Arena, Birmingham, England	
19	Loss	17–2	Dan Azeez	UD	12	3 Sept 2022	M&S Bank Arena, Liverpool, England	British light-heavyweight title
18	Win	17–1	Reece Cartwright	TKO	8 (10), 3:00	13 Nov 2021	Skydome, Coventry, England	Won vacant WBC International light-heavyweight title
17	Win	16–1	Farouk Daku	PTS	8	10 Sep 2021	Skydome, Coventry, England	
16	Win	15–1	Jermaine Springer	TKO	5 (10), 2:55	22 May 2021	Skydome, Coventry, England	
15	Loss	14–1	Craig Richards	TKO	9 (12), 2:42	18 Dec 2020	Fly By Nite Rehearsal Studios, Redditch, England	Lost British light-heavyweight title
14	Win	14–0	Chad Sugden	UD	12	22 Aug 2020	Production Park Studios, Redditch, England	Won vacant British light-heavyweight title
13	Win	13–0	Dec Spelman	UD	10	14 Sep 2019	York Hall, London, England	Won English light-heavyweight title
12	Win	12–0	Dmitrij Kalinovskij	PTS	6	10 May 2019	Indigo at The O2, London, England	
11	Win	11–0	Norbert Szekeres	KO	1 (6), 2:30	29 Mar 2019	Holte Suite at Villa Park, Birmingham, England	
10	Win	10–0	Dec Spelman	UD	3	2 Nov 2018	Indigo at The O2, London, England	Ultimate Boxxer II – final
9	Win	9–0	Georgii Bacon	KO	2 (3), 2:13	2 Nov 2018	Indigo at The O2, London, England	Ultimate Boxxer II – semi-final
8	Win	8–0	Sam Smith	UD	3	2 Nov 2018	indigo at The O2, London, England	Ultimate Boxxer II – quarter-final
7	Win	7–0	Imantas Davidaitis	TKO	2 (4), 0:49	8 Sep 2018	Arena Birmingham, Birmingham, England	
6	Win	6–0	Kent Kauppinen	KO	1 (4), 2:04	19 May 2018	Holte Suite at Villa Park, Birmingham, England	
5	Win	5–0	Elvis Dube	PTS	4	24 Mar 2018	Resorts World Arena, Birmingham, England	
4	Win	4–0	Jiri Svacina	PTS	4	18 Nov 2017	Holte Suite at Villa Park, Birmingham, England	
3	Win	3–0	Dmitrij Kalinovskij	PTS	4	16 Sep 2017	Holte Suite at Villa Park, Birmingham, England	
2	Win	2–0	Jevgenijs Andrejevs	PTS	4	24 Jun 2017	Holte Suite at Villa Park, Birmingham, England	
1	Win	1–0	Remigijus Ziausys	PTS	4	18 Mar 2017	Holte Suite at Villa Park, Birmingham, England	

Sporting positions
Regional boxing titles
Preceded by Dec Spelman	English light-heavyweight champion 14 September 2019 – December 2019; Vacated	Vacant Title next held by Dan Azeez
Vacant Title last held by Joshua Buatsi	British light-heavyweight champion 22 August 2020 – 18 December 2020	Succeeded by Craig Richards
