= Amer Khan (boxer) =

English boxer

Personal information
- Nickname: "Killa"
- Nationality: British
- Born: Amer Khan; 21 February 1981 (age 45) Sheffield, England
- Height: 6 ft 4 in (1.93 m)
- Weight: Light heavyweight

Boxing career
- Stance: Southpaw

Boxing record
- Total fights: 13
- Wins: 13
- Win by KO: 1
- Losses: 0
- Draws: 0
- No contests: 0

Amer Khan (born 21 February 1981 in Sheffield) is a light heavyweight boxer based in Sheffield, England. He was a National Amateur champion and an undefeated former Central Area light heavyweight champion.

== Professional Boxing Career ==
Khan made his professional debut in 2003. Khan beat Darren Stubs to become the BBBofC Central Area light heavyweight champion in 2006, and has been inactive since 2007.

No.	Result	Record	Opponent	Type	Round, time	Date	Location	Notes
13	Win	13-0	Ayitey Powers	PTS	6	23 March 2007	Nottingham Arena, Nottingham, England	
12	Win	12-0	Darren Stubbs	PTS	10	18 June 2006	George Carnall Leisure Centre, Davyhulme, Manchester	Won the Central Area title
11	Win	11–0	Paul Bonson	PTS	6	5 March 2006	Octagon Centre, Sheffield	
10	Win	10–0	Donvill Hendricks	PTS	4	26 November 2005	Sheffield Arena, Sheffield, England	
9	Win	9–0	Karl Wheeler	PTS	6	4 March 2005	Magna Centre, Sheffield, England	
8	Win	8–0	Paulino da Silva	PTS	6	24 October 2004	Octagon Centre, Sheffield, England	
7	Win	7–0	Hastings Rasani	PTS	6	17 June 2004	Octagon Centre, Sheffield, England	
6	Win	6–0	Michael Pinnock	PTS	6	3 April 2004	Waltheof Sports Centre, Sheffield, England	
5	Win	5–0	Terry Morrill	PTS	6	6 February 2004	Ponds Forge Arena, Sheffield, England	
4	Win	4–0	Terry Morrill	PTS	6	4 December 2003	Swallow Hotel, Sunderland, England	
3	Win	3–0	Shpetim Hoti	TKO	4 (6)	5 September 2003	Ponds Forge Arena, Sheffield, England	
2	Win	2–0	Michael Pinnock	PTS	6	31 July 2003	Octagon Centre, Sheffield	
1	Win	1–0	Gary Jones	PTS	6	6 June 2003	KC Sports Arena, Kingston upon Hull, England	

== Outside professional boxing ==
Amer previously helped raise funds for the Kashmir earthquake. He worked as a part-time ambulance driver and is currently a full-time fireman. He has also established a reputation as a cornerman, working alongside a number of high-profile professional fighters. Among those he has supported are former two-weight world champion Billy Joe Saunders, undefeated super-middleweight world champion Hamzah Sheeraz, British middleweight contender Felix Cash, and current British and Commonwealth champion Lewis Edmondson.
