= Mohammad Amir Khan =

Mohammad Amir Khan may refer to:

- Mohammad Amir Khan (cricketer) (born 2001), Pakistani cricketer
- Mohammad Amir Khan (field hockey) (born 1993), Indian field hockey player
- Mohammad Amir Hasan Khan (1849–1903), ruler of Mahmudabad in India
- Mohammad Amir Ahmad Khan (1914–1973), last ruler of Mahmudabad
- Aamir Khan or Mohammed Aamir Hussain Khan (born 1965), Indian actor
- Amir Khan (Tonk State)

== See also ==
- Mohammad Khan (disambiguation)
- Amir Khan (disambiguation)
