= Amir Khan II =

- Mughal Subahdar

Subahdar of Kabul Subah
- Governorship: 18 February 1677 – 27 April 1698
- Predecessor: Azim Khan Koka
- Successor: Prince Shah Alam
- Emperor: Aurangzeb

Subahdar of Bihar Subah
- Governorship: c. 1674 – 1676
- Emperor: Aurangzeb

Subahdar of Allahabad Subah
- Governorship: c. 1670 – 1671
- Predecessor: Allahverdi Khan
- Emperor: Aurangzeb
- Born: Mir Khan
- Died: 27 April 1698; Kabul Subah, Mughal Empire
- Spouse: Sahibji Begum
- Issue: Mir Khan; Muhammad Jafar Aqidat Khan; Muhammad Ibrahim Marhamat Khan; Amir Khan III; Hadi Khan; Saif Khan; Asadullah Khan; Khadija Begum
Names
- Mir Khan ibn Khalilullah Khan
- Father: Khalilullah Khan
- Mother: Hamida Banu Begum
- Religion: Shia Islam

Amir Khan II (died 27 April 1698), also known earlier as Mir Khan, was a Mughal nobleman, military commander, and administrator during the reign of Emperor Aurangzeb. The son of Khalilullah Khan of Yazd, he rose through the Mughal ranks under Shah Jahan and Aurangzeb, serving as faujdar of Jammu and governor of Allahabad, Bihar, and most notably Kabul.

He is chiefly remembered for his long governorship of Kabul Subah from 1677 until his death in 1698, during which he successfully stabilized the turbulent Afghan frontier through a combination of military action, diplomacy, and tribal politics. Contemporary chroniclers praised his political skill in managing the Yusufzai and other Afghan tribes, considering him one of the most effective Mughal governors of the north-west frontier. He was also known for his adherence to Shia Islam and his patronage of religious scholars in Persia.

== Life ==
Amir Khan's father was Khalilullah Khan of Yazd, while his mother Hamida Banu Begum was a maternal granddaughter of Asaf Khan. He was a brother of Ruhullah Khan.

He first rose under Shah Jahan, receiving a mansab of 1,500 and accompanying his father in imperial service. After his father's death during Aurangzeb's reign, he was appointed faujdar of the Jammu hill region and later took part in campaigns against the rebellious Yusufzai Afghans near Shahbazgarhi and Koh-i-Kara Mar, where he raided and burned insurgent villages.

Amir Khan later became darogha of the mansabdars and then governor of Allahabad with a rank of 4,000 and 3,000 horse. Though briefly disgraced and removed from office, he was restored to imperial favor and appointed governor of Bihar, where he suppressed Afghan rebels in Shahjahanpur and Kant-Golah. He subsequently joined Prince Shah Alam on the Kabul expedition.

His greatest achievement came as governor of Kabul from 1677 until his death in 1698. At a time when the Afghan tribes of the frontier repeatedly rebelled against Mughal authority, Amir Khan combined military force with diplomacy and tribal politics to stabilize the region. Rather than relying solely on repression, he cultivated alliances among tribal chiefs, exploited rivalries between Afghan factions, and won over many leaders through negotiation and patronage. He died on 27 April 1698 and was buried beside his father.

== Family ==
Amir Khan's wife, known as Sahibji, was a daughter of Ali Mardan Khan, and after Amir Khan's death, she concealed the news of his death temporarily to prevent unrest in Kabul and effectively governed the province until the arrival of Prince Shah Alam. Her administrative ability impressed Aurangzeb himself, who reportedly trusted that Kabul would remain stable as long as she remained in charge.

Although Amir Khan had no children by Sahibji, he had numerous sons by concubines and other women. According to the chronicle Ma'asir-ul Umara, Sahibji eventually accepted and raised these children herself. Among his better-known children were:

- Mir Khan, his eldest son, who received a mansab of 1,000 and served at Lahore;
- Muhammad Jafar Aqidat Khan, later governor of Patna and bakhshi to Prince Azim-ush-Shan;
- Muhammad Ibrahim Marhamat Khan;
- Muhammad Ishaq Amir Khan;
- Hadi Khan;
- Saif Khan, later faujdar of Purnia;
- Asadullah Khan, who became bakhshi of the Deccan under the patronage of Asaf Jah I;
- Khadija Begum, married Ruhullah Khan II, son of her uncle, Ruhullah Khan.

== Bibliography ==
- Shah Nawaz, Khān (1952). Abd-ur-Rahim (ed.). Maasir-ul-Umara. Vol. 1. Translated by Beveridge, H.; Prashad, Baini. Calcutta: The Asiatic Society.
