= Amir Khan (Indian cricketer) =

Indian cricketer (born 1986)

Personal information
- Full name: Mohammad Amir Khan
- Born: 27 January 1986 (age 40); Kanpur, Uttar Pradesh, India
- Batting: Right-handed
- Role: Wicketkeeper

Domestic team information
- Years: Team
- 2004–2013: Uttar Pradesh
- Source: ESPNcricinfo, 17 April, 2016

Mohammad Amir Khan (born 27 January 1986) is an Indian first-class cricketer who plays for Uttar Pradesh cricket team. He made his first-class debut at age 18 in 2004 when played against Punjab cricket team.
