= Lisnyky, Ternopil Oblast =

Rural locality in Ternopil Oblast, Ukraine

Lisnyky Лісники
- Location in Ternopil Oblast
- Coordinates: 49°27′9″N 24°53′0″E
- Country: Ukraine
- Oblast: Ternopil Oblast
- Raion: Ternopil Raion
- Hromada: Berezhany urban hromada
- Time zone: UTC+2 (EET)
  - Summer (DST): UTC+3 (EEST)
- Postal code: 47505

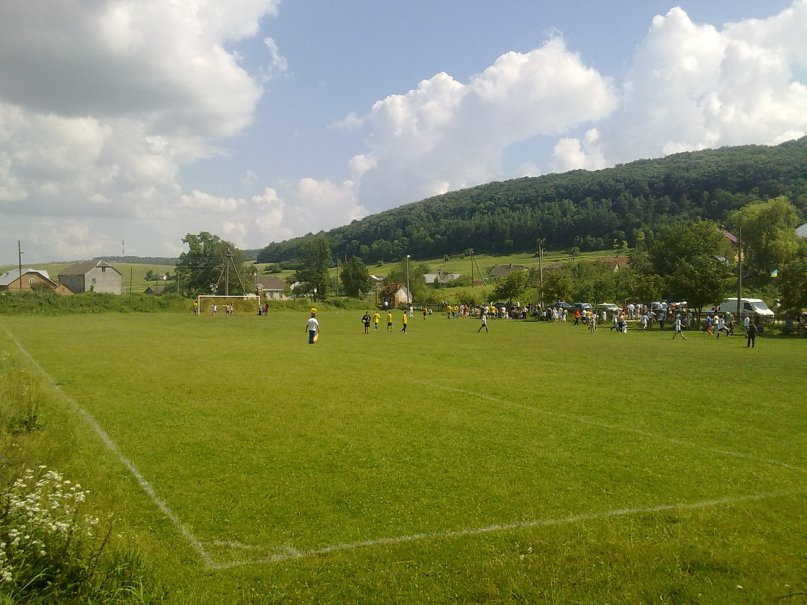
Stadium in the village of Lisnyky, Ternopil Oblast

Lisnyky (Ukrainian: Лісники) is a village in Berezhany urban hromada, Ternopil Raion, Ternopil Oblast, Ukraine.

== History ==
The first written mention of the village was in 1368.

After the liquidation of the Berezhany Raion on 19 July 2020, the village became part of the Ternopil Raion.

== Religion ==
- Church of the Nativity of the Blessed Virgin Mary (1902, brick).

== Sources ==
- (in Ukrainian) Мельничук Б., Ханас В., Лісники // Ternopil Encyclopedic Dictionary: in 4 v. / editorial board: H. Yavorskyi and other, Ternopil: "Zbruch", 2005, V. 2: К—О, S. 376. — ISBN 966-528-199-2.
- "Leśniki (po rusku Lisnyki". Geographical Dictionary of the Kingdom of Poland (in Polish). 5. Warszawa: Kasa im. Józefa Mianowskiego. 1884. p. 164.
