= Amir Khan I =

Mughal nobleman

Mir Amir Khan I

Subedar of Thatta
- In office 1629–1647
- Monarch: Shah Jahan

Governor of Gujarat

Governor of Bihar

Personal details
- Died: 1647 Thatta, Sindh
- Parent: Mir Qasim Khan Namkin (father)
- Profession: Nobleman, administrator

Amir Khan I (Mir Abul Wafa, also known as Mir Abul Baqa; died 1647) was a Mughal nobleman and the eldest son of Mir Qasim Khan Namkin. He served under the emperors Jahangir and Shah Jahan, holding several provincial governorships, including Gujarat, Bihar, and Sindh. He was appointed Subedar (governor) of Thatta in 1629–30, a position he held until his death in 1647 at an age reported to be over 100 years.

== History ==
Amir Khan I was the eldest son of Mir Qasim Khan Namkin, a prominent Mughal official in Sindh. He received the title "Mir Khan" from Emperor Jahangir, and Emperor Shah Jahan later modified the title to "Amir Khan" by adding an alif.

During his career, Amir Khan served as Mughal governor of Gujarat and Bihar before being appointed Subedar of Thatta in AH 1039 (AD 1629–30). He remained in charge of Thatta for much of Shah Jahan's reign, overseeing the province during periods of political stability and economic growth.

Contemporary accounts note that at the time of his death in AH 1057 (AD 1647–48), he was more than a century old. His burial took place in Thatta, where he had governed for nearly two decades.

== See also ==
- Tahir Muhammad Thattvi
- Mir Ahmed Nasrallah Thattvi
