= Dillian Whyte vs. Joseph Parker =

Boxing match

- Date: 28 July 2018
- Venue: The O2 Arena, Greenwich, London, UK
- Title(s) on the line: WBC Silver and WBO International heavyweight titles

Tale of the tape
Boxer	Dillian Whyte	Joseph Parker
Nickname	"The Body Snatcher"	"JP"
Hometown	Brixton, London, UK	Auckland, Auckland Region, New Zealand
Purse	>£1,000,000	>£1,000,000
Pre-fight record	23–1 (17 KOs)	24–1 (18 KOs)
Age	30 years, 3 months	26 years, 6 months
Height	6 ft 4 in (193 cm)	6 ft 4 in (193 cm)
Weight	258.5 lb (117 kg)	242 lb (110 kg)
Style	Orthodox	Orthodox
Recognition	WBC; No. 1 Ranked Heavyweight; WBO; No. 2 Ranked Heavyweight; WBA; No. 7 Ranked Heavyweight; TBRB; No. 5 Ranked Heavyweight; The Ring; No. 6 Ranked Heavyweight; WBC Silver heavyweight champion	WBC/IBF/WBO; No. 6 Ranked Heavyweight; TBRB; No. 3 Ranked Heavyweight; The Ring; No. 4 Ranked Heavyweight; Former WBO heavyweight champion

Result
- Whyte defeated Parker via Unanimous Decision

Dillian Whyte vs. Joseph Parker, was a professional boxing match contested on 28 July 2018, for the WBC Silver and WBO International heavyweight titles.

== Background ==
Since his WBC title eliminator victory over bitter rival Derek Chisora in December 2016, Dillian Whyte had fought Malcolm Tann (replacing first Mariusz Wach then Michael Grant) Robert Helenius (after talks with Dominic Breazeale broke down) and Lucas Browne. On 24 April 2018, the WBC ordered Whyte to face Luis Ortiz in an eliminator bout for their heavyweight champion, Deontay Wilder. Whyte stated that he felt 'betrayed' by this decision as he thought he was already in line to challenge Wilder next, given his number 1 ranking and WBC Silver belt. The WBC made number 2 ranked Dominic Breazeale the mandatory challenger, although they previously confirmed his win over Eric Molina was not a final eliminator. Whyte stated, if anything, the WBC should order Whyte vs. Breazeale as a final eliminator. Promoter Eddie Hearn was also puzzled by the decision. At the same time, the IBF also ordered Whyte to fight former world title challenger Kubrat Pulev.

On 24 April, the WBC ordered Whyte vs. Luis Ortiz in an eliminator bout for their heavyweight champion, Deontay Wilder. Whyte felt 'betrayed' by this decision from the WBC as he thought he was already in line to challenge Wilder next. The WBC made Dominic Breazeale the mandatory challenger, although they previously confirmed his win over Eric Molina was not a final eliminator. Whyte stated, if anything, the WBC should order Whyte vs. Breazeale as the final eliminator. Promoter Eddie Hearn was also puzzled by the decision. At the same time, the IBF also ordered Whyte to fight former world title challenger Kubrat Pulev (25–1, 13 KO). A purse bid was set for 10 May. The purse bids were delayed as a deal between Hearn and Team Sauerland, Pulev's promoter, was close to being agreed. The IBF gave them until 24 May. Despite Whyte stating that Pulev did not want the fight, Pulev stated he was more than happy to fight Whyte, but "a lot of things need to be agreed" before the fight could be confirmed. According to Nisse Sauerland, the date of 28 July was being discussed with the host venue being either London or Bulgaria. New York based promotional company, Epic Sports & Entertainment, made a purse bid of $1,500,111, winning the rights of the fight. Eddie Hearn offered $831,111, which was higher than the $801,305 bid from Team Sauerland. IBF rules state, for a final eliminator, the higher ranked boxer, in this case Pulev, would get 75% ($1,125,083.25) and Whyte would earn $375,027.75 for the fight. On 6 June, although the Whyte vs. Pulev fight was not off the table, it was heavily rumoured via multiple sources that Whyte would instead fight Luis Ortiz in a WBC final eliminator. Many media outlets announced the fight. Pulev was unhappy with the pull out and labelled Whyte and Hearn as "extreme manipulators and plain schizophrenics" as well as accusing them of avoiding him at all costs.

On the morning of 7 June, it was confirmed that Whyte would instead fight former WBO heavyweight champion Joseph Parker (24–1, 18 KOs) on 28 July at The O2 Arena in London on Sky Box Office. An official press conference followed a few hours later. Many fans took to social media stating their frustration around the fight being on pay-per-view. Whyte, along with Parker's promoter David Higgins, explained their reasons as to why the fight deserved to be on the PPV platform. The fight itself was praised by fans for the match up, with it being billed as an eliminator for the winner to challenge Anthony Joshua for the unified heavyweight titles. Three days before the fight, it was confirmed a sell-out. It was revealed that before PPV revenue, both boxers would earn just over £1 million for the fight, with Whyte receiving slightly more, being the home fighter. Despite stating he would weigh less, Whyte came in at 258 1/2 pounds, 4 pounds heavier than his previous bout. Parker weighed 242 pounds, 16 pounds lighter than Whyte, however 6 pounds heavier than what he weighed in his loss to Joshua.

Although there was some criticism to the bout being on PPV the fight itself was praised by fans for the match up.

== Fight details ==
Whyte won the bout via UD in a fight which saw both boxers hit the canvas. Whyte knocked Parker down twice in the fight, dropping him in rounds two and nine. It looked as though a short left hook dropped Parker for the first time in his career, however the instant replay showed it was a clash of heads. Referee Ian John Lewis made the count. Most of the middle rounds were mostly back and forth action with both fighters having success. Whyte was coming forward, countering and began using his jab more while Parker was mostly on the back foot, using movement and landing 2-3 punch combinations. After round six, Whyte began to show fatigue. This did not prevent him from carrying on going forward and trying to land big shots as Parker was wary of Whyte's power. Whyte also started using roughhouse tactics after the first few rounds. This included rabbit punches, head-butting, holding and hitting and pushing Parker over the ropes. He was warned once earlier in the fight and then warned again in the final rounds, however no points were deducted. Parker took over in the final rounds but was unable to put Whyte away. Parker had an explosive start to round twelve, knowing he needed a knockout to win, he eventually knocked down a fatigued Whyte with 20 seconds left in the fight with a right hand to the head. Whyte got to his feet and survived the remaining seconds of the fight. The three judges scored the fight unanimously 115–110, 114–111, and 113–112 in favour of Whyte. Many of the pundits ringside, which included Steve Bunce, had the fight closer including those on radio, with some even having Parker as the winner. Some portion of the boxing media also scored the fight close, in favour of Parker. The Sky Sports team, which included Matthew Macklin, David Haye, Johnny Nelson and Tony Bellew, were criticized for their views.

== Aftermath ==
Speaking to Sky Sports after the fight, Whyte gave Parker credit, "He was slick and I knew he was going to fight for the first few rounds, then come back in the final few rounds. I am annoyed I slipped at the final hurdle in the last round. I was rocked and took a few." Whyte stated he would take another fight before the end of 2018 and ready for Anthony Joshua in April 2019, "I would like to fight Joshua again if he wants it. I've still got a lot to learn, so I would like to get one more in before him again." Parker had no complaints and humble in defeat, "I gave it my best; the better man and I will come back stronger." Parker's trainer Kevin Barry was very vocal after the fight regarding Whyte's rough tactics, claiming he should have had points taken off.

In the post-fight press conference, Hearn spoke of Whyte's next potential fights. Derek Chisora was mentioned, however Whyte stated he was not interested as he 'had bigger fish to fry'. Hearn revealed he would offer Wilder in the region of £6 million ($8m US) to fight Whyte in New York. WBA (Regular) champion Manuel Charr and Luis Ortiz were also mentioned.

Ultimately Whyte agreed to face Chisora in December 2018.

== Fight card ==
Confirmed bouts:

Weight Class		vs.		Method	Round	Time	Notes
Heavyweight	Dillian Whyte (c)	def.	Joseph Parker	UD	12/12		^{Note 1}
Heavyweight	Derek Chisora	def.	Carlos Takam	TKO	8/12	1:01	^{Note 2}
Lightweight	Katie Taylor (c)	def.	Kimberly Connor	TKO	3/10	1:43	^{Note 3}
Welterweight	Conor Benn	def.	Cedrick Peynaud	UD	10/10		^{Note 4}
Light-heavyweight	Joshua Buatsi	def.	Andrejs Pokumeiko	KO	1/10	1:56	^{Note 5}
Heavyweight	David Allen	def.	Nick Webb	KO	4/10	2:59
Light-middleweight	Anthony Fowler	def.	Craig O'Brien	TKO	6/8	0:08
Preliminary bouts
Light-heavyweight	Frank Buglioni	def.	Emmanuel Feuzeu	RTD	6/8	3:00
Cruiserweight	Charlie Duffield	def.	Reinis Porozovs	RTD	3/4	3:00
Non-TV bouts
Cruiserweight	Richard Riakporhe	def.	Elvis Dube	RTD	2/4	3:00

^Note 1 For WBC Silver and vacant WBO International heavyweight titles
^Note 2 For vacant WBA International heavyweight title
^Note 3 For WBA and IBF lightweight titles
^Note 4 For vacant WBA Continental (Europe) welterweight title
^Note 5 For vacant WBA International light-heavyweight title

== Broadcasting ==
Country	Broadcaster
United Kingdom	Sky Sports Box Office
New Zealand	Sky Arena
Australia	Main Event
Ireland	Sky Sports Box Office
Panama	Cable Onda Sports

Preceded by vs. Lucas Browne	Dillian Whyte's bouts 28 July 2018	Succeeded by vs. Derek Chisora II
Preceded by vs. Anthony Joshua	Joseph Parker's bouts 28 July 2018	Succeeded by vs. Alexander Flores
