= Amir Khan III =

Mughal governor of Allahabad from 1739 to 1743

Amir Khan III was the title of Muhammad Ishaq the son of Amir Khan II and a descendant of the celebrated Shah Na’matullah Wali. He was a favorite of the Emperor Muhammad Shah but was appointed governor of Allahabad in 1739 against his wishes due to the Vizier Qamar ud-Din Khan and re-called to court in 1743 C.E. He was naturally of free speech and the emperor fond of his repartee had him more license in his conversation than was consistent with respect to his own dignity when he was on business with the emperor which by degrees disgusted Muhammad Shah and made him wish his removal from office. He was consequently with the consent of the emperor stabbed with a dagger by a person who had been discharged from his service and fell down dead on the spot. This circumstance took place on Friday the December 26, 1747. He was buried after four days in the mausoleum of Khalilullah Khan his grandfather which is close to the Sarai Ruhullah Khan at Delhi. His poetical name was Anjaam. He composed logo-graphs and has left Persian and Rekhta poems. There is a full account of Amir Khan in the Sujar ul Mutukharin where he is said to have died in the same year as the emperor.
