= List of British light-heavyweight boxing champions =

List of British light-heavyweight boxing champions is a table showing the boxers who have won the British light-heavyweight title. The title has been sanctioned by the National Sporting Club since 1891, and later by its replacement British Boxing Board of Control since 1929.

A champion may retire or voluntarily relinquish the title in order to fight for a higher-ranked championship. Where the date on which a champion relinquished the title is unclear, the date of the last BBBoC sanctioned fight is shown.

^{r}–Champion relinquished title.

^{s}–Champion stripped of title.

Name	Duration of reign	Defences
Dick Smith	9 March 1914 – 10 October 1916	2
Harry Reeve	10 October 1916^{r}	0
Dick Smith	25 February 1918^{r}	0
Noel "Boy" McCormick	28 April 1919^{r}	0
Jack Bloomfield	1 May 1922^{r}	0
Tom Berry	9 March 1925 – 25 April 1927	1
Gipsy Daniels	25 April 1927^{r}	0
Frank Moody	27 November 1927 – 25 November 1929	1
Harry Crossley	25 November 1929 – 23 November 1932	1
Jack Petersen	23 May 1932^{r}	0
Len Harvey	13 June 1933^{r}	0
Eddie Phillips	4 February 1935 – 27 April 1937	1
Jock McAvoy	27 April 1937 – 7 April 1938	1
Len Harvey	7 April 1938 – 20 June 1942	2
Freddie Mills	20 June 1942 – 15 February 1950^{r}	0
Don Cockell	17 October 1950 – 10 June 1952	2
Randolph Turpin	10 June 1952^{r}	0
Dennis Powell	26 March 1953 – 26 October 1953	1
Alex Buxton	26 October 1953 – 26 April 1955	2
Randolph Turpin	26 April 1955^{r}	0
Ron Barton	13 March 1956^{r}	0
Randolph Turpin	26 November 1956 – 11 June 1957^{r}	1
Chic Calderwood	28 January 1960 – 7 August 1963^{s}	2
Chic Calderwood	11 November 1964 (killed in road accident)	0
Young McCormack	19 June 1967 – 13 January 1969	2
Eddie Avoth	13 January 1969 – 24 January 1971	2
Chris Finnegan	24 January 1971 – 22 May 1973	2
John Conteh	22 May 1973 – 21 May 1974^{r}(Retired)	1
Johnny Frankham	3 June 1975 – 14 October 1975	1
Chris Finnegan	14 October 1975^{r}	0
Tim Wood	28 April 1976 – 8 March 1977	1
Bunny Johnson	8 March 1977 – 27 February 1980^{r}	3
Tom Collins	5 March 1982 – 26 January 1984	3
Dennis Andries	26 January 1984 – 10 September 1986^{r}	4
Tom Collins	11 March 1987^{r}	0
Tony Wilson	15 December 1987 – 22 March 1989	3
Tom Collins	22 March 1989^{r}	0
Steve McCarthy	25 October 1990^{r}	0
Crawford Ashley	25 August 1991 – 25 April 1992^{r}	2
Maurice Core	28 September 1992 – 1 December 1993^{r}	1
Crawford Ashley	14 March 1998 – 13 March 1999	2
Clinton Woods	13 March 1999^{r}	0
Neil Simpson	22 April 2000 – 8 March 2003	2
Peter Oboh	8 March 2003 – 12 May 2004^{r}	1
Tony Oakey	18 May 2007 – 13 June 2008	3
Dean Francis	13 June 2008^{r}	0
Nathan Cleverly	18 July 2009 – 9 October 2009^{r}	1
Tony Bellew	16 July 2011 – 27 April 2013^{r}	1
Bob Ajisafe	15 March 2014^{r}	0
Hosea Burton	27 February 2016 – 10 December 2016	0
Frank Buglioni	10 December 2016 – 24 March 2018	3
Callum Johnson	24 March 2018^{r}	0
Joshua Buatsi	23 March 2019 – 12 September 2019^{r}	0
Shakan Pitters	22 August 2020 – 18 December 2020	1
Craig Richards	18 December 2020 – 21 November 2021	0
Dan Azeez	21 November 2021 – 3 February 2024	2
Joshua Buatsi	3 February 2024^{r}	0
Lewis Edmondson	19 October 2024	0

== See also ==
- List of British heavyweight boxing champions
- List of British cruiserweight boxing champions
- List of British super-middleweight boxing champions
- List of British middleweight boxing champions
- List of British light-middleweight boxing champions
- List of British welterweight boxing champions
- List of British light-welterweight boxing champions
- List of British lightweight boxing champions
- List of British super-featherweight boxing champions
- List of British featherweight boxing champions
- List of British super-bantamweight boxing champions
- List of British bantamweight boxing champions
- List of British super-flyweight boxing champions
- List of British flyweight boxing champions
- List of British world boxing champions

== Sources ==
- boxrec
