= Carlos Takam =

Cameroonian boxer (born 1980)

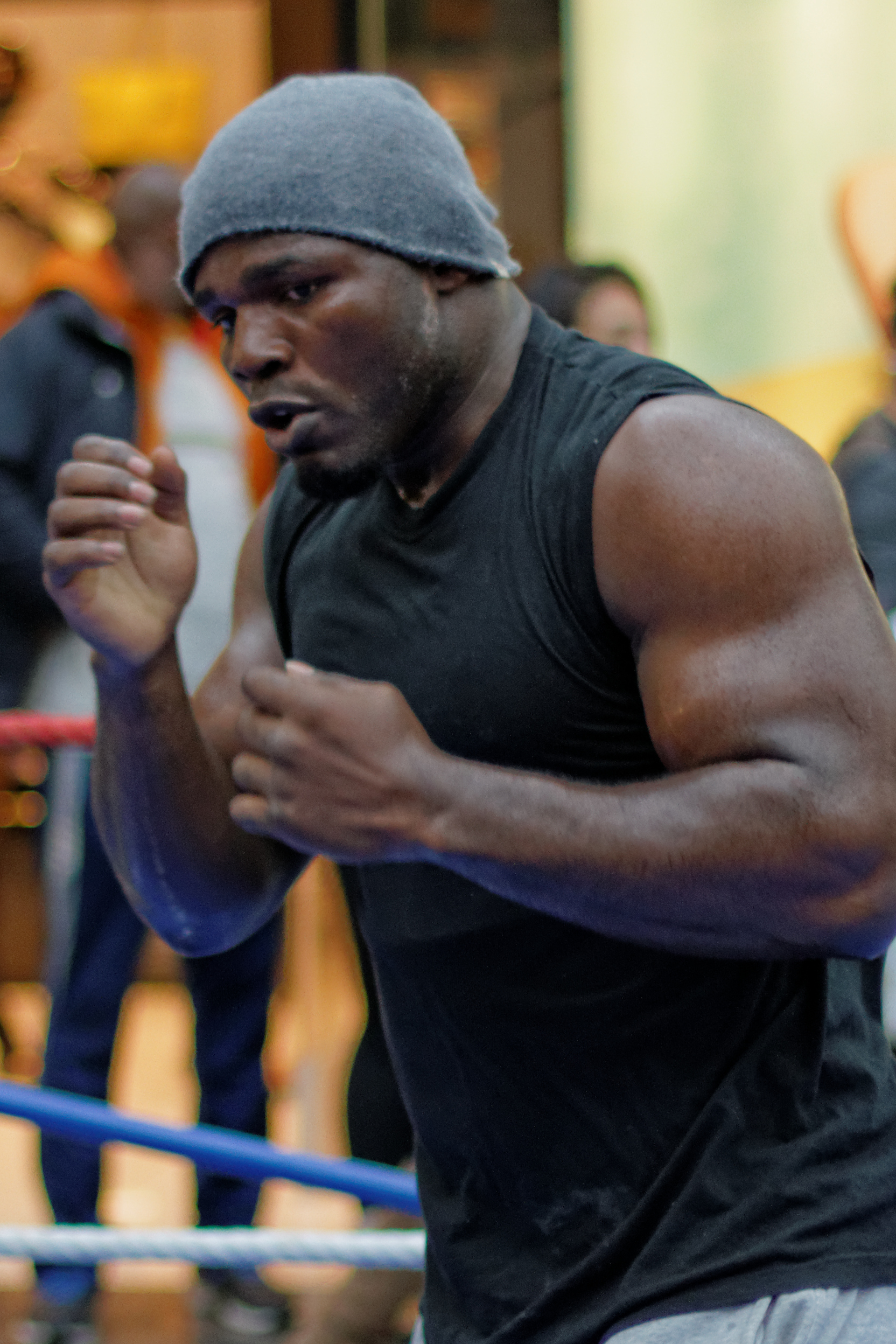
- Takam in 2014

Personal information
- Nationality: French; Cameroonian
- Born: Armand Carlos Netsing Takam; 6 December 1980 (age 45) Douala, Cameroon
- Height: 1.87 m (6 ft 1 1/2 in)
- Weight: Heavyweight

Boxing career
- Reach: 204 cm (80 1/2 in)
- Stance: Orthodox

Boxing record
- Total fights: 49
- Wins: 40
- Win by KO: 28
- Losses: 8
- Draws: 1
Medal record
Men's amateur boxing
Representing Cameroon
All-Africa Games
Bronze medal – third place	2003 Abuja	Super-heavyweight
African Championships
Gold medal – first place	2003 Yaoundé	Super-heavyweight

Armand Carlos Netsing Takam (born 6 December 1980) is a Cameroonian-French former professional boxer who competed from 2005 to 2023. He challenged once for the unified WBA (Super), IBF, and IBO heavyweight titles in 2017. At regional level, he held multiple heavyweight championships, and challenged once for the Commonwealth title in 2021. As an amateur, he represented Cameroon at the 2004 Olympics.

== Early life ==
Carlos Takam was born in Douala, Cameroon. He competed as an amateur boxer for his home country of Cameroon. He later moved to France and holds French citizenship.

== Amateur career ==
Takam competed at the 2003 All-Africa Games in Abuja, Nigeria, Takam captured the bronze medal in his weight division.

In 2004 he represented his native country, Cameroon, at the 2004 Summer Olympics in Athens, Greece but was beaten in the round of sixteen by Egypt's Mohamed Aly. Takam qualified for the Athens Games by winning the gold medal at the 1st AIBA African 2004 Olympic Qualifying Tournament in Casablanca, Morocco. In the decisive final of the event he defeated Angolan fighter Georgio Cabta.

== Professional career ==
=== Early career ===
Takam made his professional debut in France on 10 December 2005, when he defeated Zine Eddine Benmakhlouf of Belgium. He went on to build up a record of 17–0 by the end of 2008. His first loss as a professional came in June 2009, when he lost to undefeated French prospect Grégory Tony by unanimous decision over eight rounds. Following this loss Takam went on to gain four knockout wins by the end of 2010. Takam’s first fight of 2011 was against Gbenga Oluokun of Nigeria. Takam won the bout by stoppage in the sixth round after Oluokun retired on his stool. Takam picked up the vacant WBO Africa heavyweight title by beating Oluokun. He went on to beat Samir Kurtagić on 2 December 2011.

Takam next fought on 31 March 2012, when he faced former world title challenger Frans Botha. Takam won the fight by knockout in the 11th round to retain his WBO Africa heavyweight title and also pick up to vacant WBF International heavyweight title. Takam went on to fight two more times in 2012, defeating Thomas Mrazek and Ivica Perkovic.

On 24 May 2013, Takam took on former world title challenger Michael Grant. Takam knocked Grant out in the eighth round to claim the WBF heavyweight title. Takam fought again in December 2013, when he knocked out Jakov Gospic in three rounds.

=== Career from 2014–2015 ===
==== Takam vs. Perez ====
Takam made his HBO debut on 18 January 2014 against Cuban Mike Perez. The fight started slowly, with little action in the first five rounds, however, Takam took over starting in round six, as he planted his feet inside and was able to work Perez over. The Cuban's arms got heavier and heavier as the fight went on, and he didn't seem to have his usual snap or speed. Takam was able to hurt Perez in round six and round ten.

BLH had the fight 97–93 for Takam, giving him rounds six through ten after a 3–2 start in Perez's favour. Official scores were 96–94 (Michael Buffer did not announce who got that card) and 95–95 two times for the majority draw.

==== Takam vs. Thompson ====
On 6 June 2014 Takam took on Tony Thompson, (39–5–0, 26KOs) at the Palais des Sport Marcel Cerdan in Paris, France. The 33-year-old Takam aggressively took the fight to the 42-year-old Thompson. Thompson had some success counter-punching, but Takam’s relentless work-rate overwhelmed Thompson at times. Takam dominated the fight and began to punish Thompson more and more as the bout progressed. Takam won the fight by unanimous decision with scores of 117–111, 117–111, and 119–109 to win the vacant WBC Silver heavyweight title.

==== Takam vs. Povetkin ====
In October 2014 Takam faced Russian Alexander Povetkin (27–1–0, 19 KOs) at the Luzhiniki Palace of Sports in Moscow, Russia. In a close fight that was a contender for fight of the year, Takam lost the fight via 10th round KO after Poventkin landed a left hook to the head of Takam.

==== Takam vs. Nascimento, Sprott, Arias ====
Takam fought three times in 2015, defeating Marcelo Nascimento and Michael Sprott by knockout and George Arias by unanimous decision in an eight round bout.

=== Career from 2016–2017 ===
==== Takam vs. Parker ====
On 21 May 2016 Carlos Takam fought Joseph Parker in an IBF heavyweight title eliminator. The winner would be required to fight for the world title against the reigning champion, Anthony Joshua of Britain. Prior to the fight being announced, Parker and his handlers twice avoided fighting Takam the previous year because of the risk involved. The fight took place with Parker winning a unanimous decision after twelve rounds, in front of a vocal home crowd at South Auckland's Vodafone Events Centre in New Zealand. Two judges scored it 116–112, and one at 115–113. Despite the result the fight was very close until the end with Takam landing painful and dangerous combinations of shots.

==== Takam vs. Rekowski, Bacurin ====
Takam’s first fight of 2017 took place on 29 January, when he faced Marcin Rekowski of Poland. Takam won the fight by fourth round knockout. He next fought in June 2017, Defeating Ivica Bacurin by knockout in the second round.

=== World title challenge ===
==== Takam vs. Joshua ====
On 16 October 2017, Takam was made a late replacement to fight Anthony Joshua on 28 October at the Principality Stadium, Cardiff, after Joshua's original opponent Kubrat Pulev pulled out of their fight with a shoulder injury. Takam gave a brave performance and took Joshua 10 rounds before the referee stepped in and waved the fight off after Joshua landed a flurry of punches.

=== Career from 2018 ===
==== Takam vs. Chisora ====
On 15 June 2018, it was confirmed that Takam would face Derek Chisora on 28 July at The O2 Arena, London, England, on the undercard of Dillian Whyte vs. Joseph Parker. Chisora knocked out Takam in the 8th round in an exciting battle, although Takam had dominated the early rounds and was ahead on the judges' scorecards when he was knocked out.

==== Takam vs. Gashi ====
On 22 December 2018, Takam fought Senad Gashi. Takam was outlanding Gashi for most of the fight. In the eighth, Takam managed to drop Gashi three times, the third time also being the final one that prompted the referee to wave off the fight.

==== Takam vs. Lewis, Maldonado, Forrest ====
Following his victory against Gashi, Takam would go on to record three consecutive ten-round unanimous decision victories. The first came on 14 September 2019 against Craig Lewis in Monticello, New York, with Takam winning via scores of 99–91, 99–91, 96–94. His next fight on 28 February 2020 also took place in the state of New York, this time in Huntington against Fábio Maldonado, which he won by shutout unanimous decision. On 9 July 2020, Takam fought Jerry Forrest. Takam stepped in to fight Forrest on short notice, which was noticeable especially in the later rounds. Takam was able to build up an early lead, however, which was enough to win an all three judges' scorecards, 98–92, 97–93 and 96–94.

==== Takam vs. Joyce ====
On 16 June 2021, it was announced that Takam's next fight would be against undefeated Joe Joyce on 24 July at the SSE Arena, London. After a slow start from Joyce on the night, in which Takam landed numerous punches to the head and body of Joyce in the opening rounds, Takam was staggered by his opponent at the start of the sixth round, overwhelmed with a barrage of punches which forced referee Steve Gray to halt the fight. The official result was a sixth-round technical knockout victory for Joyce.

== Professional boxing record ==
49 fights	40 wins	8 losses
By knockout	28	5
By decision	12	3
Draws	1	

No.	Result	Record	Opponent	Type	Round, time	Date	Location	Notes
49	Loss	40–8–1	Martin Bakole	TKO	4 (10), 2:15	28 Oct 2023	Kingdom Arena, Riyadh, Saudi Arabia	
48	Win	40–7–1	Tony Yoka	SD	10	11 Mar 2023	Accor Arena, Paris, France	
47	Loss	39–7–1	Arslanbek Makhmudov	UD	10	16 Sep 2022	Montreal Casino, Montreal, Canada	For WBC-NABF, WBA-NABA, and vacant WBC Silver heavyweight titles
46	Loss	39–6–1	Joe Joyce	TKO	6 (12) 0:49	24 Jul 2021	The SSE Arena, London, England	For Commonwealth, WBC Silver and WBO International heavyweight titles
45	Win	39–5–1	Jerry Forrest	UD	10	9 Jul 2020	MGM Grand Conference Center, Paradise, Nevada, U.S.	
44	Win	38–5–1	Fábio Maldonado	UD	10	28 Feb 2020	The Paramount, Huntington, New York, U.S.	
43	Win	37–5–1	Craig Lewis	UD	10	14 Sep 2019	Resorts World Catskills, Monticello, New York, U.S.	
42	Win	36–5–1	Senad Gashi	TKO	7 (10), 1:40	22 Dec 2018	The O2 Arena, London, England	
41	Loss	35–5–1	Derek Chisora	TKO	8 (12), 1:01	28 Jul 2018	The O2 Arena, London, England	For vacant WBA International heavyweight title
40	Loss	35–4–1	Anthony Joshua	TKO	10 (12), 1:34	28 Oct 2017	Principality Stadium, Cardiff, Wales	For WBA (Super), IBF, and IBO heavyweight titles
39	Win	35–3–1	Ivica Bacurin	KO	2 (8), 2:18	17 Jun 2017	Casino de la Vallée, Saint-Vincent, Italy	
38	Win	34–3–1	Marcin Rekowski	KO	4 (12), 0:42	29 Jan 2017	Cotai Arena, Cotai, Macau	Won vacant IBF Inter-Continental heavyweight title
37	Loss	33–3–1	Joseph Parker	UD	12	21 May 2016	Vodafone Events Centre, Auckland, New Zealand	
36	Win	33–2–1	George Arias	UD	8	28 Nov 2015	Palazzetto dello Sport le Cupole, Turin, Italy	
35	Win	32–2–1	Michael Sprott	KO	5 (8)	13 Jun 2015	Cirque d'hiver, Paris, France	
34	Win	31–2–1	Marcelo Nascimento	KO	4 (10)	10 Apr 2015	Gymnase du Clos de l'Arche, Noisy-le-Grand, France	
33	Loss	30–2–1	Alexander Povetkin	KO	10 (12), 0:54	24 Oct 2014	Luzhniki Stadium, Moscow, Russia	Lost WBC Silver heavyweight title
32	Win	30–1–1	Tony Thompson	UD	12	6 Jun 2014	Palais des sports Marcel-Cerdan, Levallois-Perret, France	Won vacant WBC Silver heavyweight title
31	Draw	29–1–1	Mike Perez	MD	10	18 Jan 2014	Bell Centre, Montreal, Canada	For WBC–USNBC heavyweight title
30	Win	29–1	Jakov Gospic	KO	3 (8)	20 Dec 2013	Hall des Sports Pellière Donatien, Fort-de-France, France	
29	Win	28–1	Michael Grant	TKO	8 (12), 0:50	24 May 2013	Gymnase du Clos de l'Arche, Noisy-le-Grand, France	Won WBF heavyweight title
28	Win	27–1	Ivica Perković	TKO	3 (8)	14 Dec 2012	Gymnase des Roulants, Cergy-Pontoise, France	
27	Win	26–1	Tomáš Mrázek	PTS	8	26 May 2012	Les Trois-Îlets, France	
26	Win	25–1	Francois Botha	TKO	11 (12)	31 Mar 2012	Gymnase Jean-Richepin, Noisy-le-Grand, France	Retained WBO Africa heavyweight title; Won vacant WBF International heavyweight title
25	Win	24–1	Samir Kurtagić	PTS	8	2 Dec 2011	Gymnase du Clos de l'Arche, Noisy-le-Grand, France	
24	Win	23–1	Gbenga Oloukun	RTD	6 (12), 3:00	29 Apr 2011	Espace Roger-Boisramé, Pontault-Combault, France	Won vacant WBO Africa heavyweight title
23	Win	22–1	Levan Jomardashvili	TKO	3 (8)	26 Nov 2010	Gymnase du Clos de l'Arche, Noisy-le-Grand, France	
22	Win	21–1	Pavel Dolgovs	TKO	4 (8)	2 Jul 2010	Espace Marcel Pagnol, Villiers-le-Bel, France	
21	Win	20–1	Humberto Évora	TKO	2 (10)	29 May 2010	Hall des Sports Pellière Donatien, Fort-de-France, France	
20	Win	19–1	Roman Kracik	KO	1 (8)	24 Oct 2009	La Palestre, Le Cannet, France	
19	Loss	18–1	Grégory Tony	UD	8	27 Jun 2009	La Palestre, Le Cannet, France	
18	Win	18–0	Stéphane Tessier	PTS	6	10 Apr 2009	Salle Yaris, Noisy-le-Grand, France	
17	Win	17–0	Humberto Évora	KO	2 (8)	18 Sep 2008	Cirque d'hiver, Paris, France	
16	Win	16–0	Daniel Bispo	TKO	3 (8)	5 Jun 2008	Cirque d'hiver, Paris, France	
15	Win	15–0	Norbert Sallai	KO	1 (6)	17 Apr 2008	Cirque d'hiver, Paris, France	
14	Win	14–0	Daniil Peretyatko	TKO	5 (6)	21 Feb 2008	Cirque d'hiver, Paris, France	
13	Win	13–0	János Somogyi	TKO	2 (8)	15 Nov 2007	Zénith de Dijon, Dijon, France	
12	Win	12–0	Cătălin Zmărăndescu	TKO	2 (6)	2 Jun 2007	Place de la Nouvelle-Aventure, Lille, France	
11	Win	11–0	Ioan Mihai	RTD	2 (6), 3:00	11 May 2007	Gymnase Maurice Baquet, Bagnolet, France	
10	Win	10–0	János Somogyi	TKO	2 (6)	1 May 2007	Sportcomplex Tempelhof, Bruges, Belgium	
9	Win	9–0	Ioan Teosorejus	RTD	2 (8), 3:00	24 Feb 2007	Cirque de Reims, Reims, France	
8	Win	8–0	Leon Nzama-Nawezhi	PTS	4	2 Dec 2006	Palais Omnisports de Paris-Bercy, Paris, France	
7	Win	7–0	Roger Foe	TKO	1 (4)	15 Jul 2006	La Palestre, Le Cannet, France	
6	Win	6–0	Ioan Mihai	KO	1 (6)	1 Jun 2006	Salle Vallier, Marseille, France	
5	Win	5–0	Harry Duiven Jr.	KO	1 (6)	1 May 2006	Sportcomplex Tempelhof, Bruges, Belgium	
4	Win	4–0	Ibrahim Camara	TKO	3 (6)	14 Apr 2006	Parc des Expositions, Reims, France	
3	Win	3–0	Valentin Marinel	TKO	3 (4)	25 Mar 2006	Gymnase des Yvris, Noisy-le-Grand, France	
2	Win	2–0	Thierry Guezouli	PTS	6	7 Feb 2006	La Soucoupe, Saint-Nazaire, France	
1	Win	1–0	Zine Eddine Benmakhlouf	PTS	6	10 Dec 2005	Chalon-sur-Saône, France	

== Pay-per-view bouts ==
Date	Fight	Network	Buys	Source(s)
28 October 2017	Anthony Joshua vs. Carlos Takam	Sky Box Office	1,009,000	

== Filmography ==
Year	Title	Role	Notes
2023	Big George Foreman	Joe Frazier	

Sporting positions
Regional boxing titles
Vacant Title last held by Ghuslain Kiabella	WBO Africa heavyweight champion 29 April 2011 – March 2015; Vacated	Vacant Title next held by Bowie Tupou
Vacant Title last held by Raphael Zumbano Love	WBF International heavyweight champion 31 March 2012 – October 2013; Vacated	Vacant Title next held by Fabrice Aurieng
Vacant Title last held by Bermane Stiverne	WBC Silver heavyweight champion 6 June 2014 – 24 October 2014	Succeeded by Alexander Povetkin
Vacant Title last held by Eric Molina	IBF Inter-Continental heavyweight champion 29 January 2017 – July 2018; Vacated	Vacant Title next held by Robert Helenius
Minor world boxing titles
Preceded by Michael Grant	WBF heavyweight champion 24 May 2013 – March 2017; Vacated	Vacant Title next held by Erzen Rrustemi
