= Lewis Edmondson =

English boxer (born 1995)

Personal information
- Nickname: The Saint
- Born: 28 November 1995 (age 30) Southampton, Hampshire, England
- Height: 6 ft 1 in (185 cm)
- Weight: Light-heavyweight

Boxing career
- Stance: Orthodox

Boxing record
- Total fights: 13
- Wins: 12
- Win by KO: 3
- Losses: 1

Lewis Edmondson (born 28 November 1995) is an English professional boxer who has held the British and Commonwealth light-heavyweight titles since 19 October 2024.

== Career ==
After an amateur career which saw him record 52 wins from 60 bouts, Edmondson had his first professional fight on 27 September 2019, defeating Gianni Antoh on points over four rounds at the Royal Albert Hall in London.

Managed by Billy Joe Saunders, he won the vacant British and Commonwealth light-heavyweight titles on 19 October 2024, with a majority decision win over Dan Azeez at London's Copper Box Arena. Despite being deducted a point for delivering a punch after the referee called break in the eighth round, Edmondson was awarded the contest 115–112 and 114–113 respectively by two of the ringside judges, while the third had it a 114–114 draw.

He made a successful first defense of his Commonwealth title against Nigerian boxer Oluwatosin Kejawa at Bournemouth International Centre on 1 March 2025, winning by unanimous decision.

Edmondson challenged IBF Intercontinental light-heavyweight champion Daniel Lapin at Wembley Stadium in London on 19 July 2025. He lost the bout by majority decision, his first defeat as a professional boxer, with two judges favouring his opponent 96–94, overruling the third who scored the contest a 95–95 tie.

He was scheduled to defend his British and Commonwealth tities against Ezra Taylor at the O2 Arena in London on 25 October 2025. However, he withdrew six days before the fight due to a hip injury sustained during training camp.

Edmondson fought Lyndon Arthur at St Mary's Stadium in Southampton on 20 June 2026. He won via unanimous decision to claim the vacant WBA International light-heavyweight title.

== Professional boxing record ==
13 fights	12 wins	1 loss
By knockout	3	0
By decision	9	1

No.	Result	Record	Opponent	Type	Round, time	Date	Location	Notes
13	Win	12–1	Lyndon Arthur	UD	10	20 Jun 2026	St Mary's Stadium, Southampton, England	Won vacant WBA International light-heavyweight title
12	Loss	11–1	Daniel Lapin	MD	10	19 Jul 2025	Wembley Stadium, London, England	For WBA Continental, IBF Inter-Continental, and vacant WBO International light-heavyweight titles
11	Win	11–0	Oluwatosin Kejawa	UD	12	1 Mar 2025	Bournemouth International Centre, Bournemouth, England	Retained the Commonwealth light-heavyweight title
10	Win	10–0	Dan Azeez	MD	12	19 Oct 2024	Copper Box Arena, London, England	Won the vacant British and Commonwealth light-heavyweight titles
9	Win	9–0	Joel McIntyre	PTS	8	11 May 2024	Cardiff International Arena, Cardiff, Wales	
8	Win	8–0	Dmytro Fedas	PTS	6	10 Dec 2023	Bournemouth International Centre, Bournemouth, England	
7	Win	7–0	Petar Nosic	TD	5 (6)	27 May 2023	Vitality Stadium, Bournemouth, England	
6	Win	6–0	Edgars Sniedze	TKO	5 (6)	26 Nov 2022	Magna Centre, Rotherham, England	
5	Win	5–0	Luke Blackledge	RTD	3 (6)	17 Apr 2021	Bolton Whites Hotel, Bolton, England	
4	Win	4–0	John Telford	TKO	3 (6)	4 Dec 2020	Wembley Arena, London, England	
3	Win	3–0	Scott Williams	PTS	4	11 Nov 2020	Production Park Studios, South Kirkby, England	
2	Win	2–0	Nathan Halton	PTS	4	27 Dec 2019	Central Hall, Southampton, England	
1	Win	1–0	Gianni Antoh	PTS	4	27 Sep 2019	Royal Albert Hall, London, England	
