= Callum Johnson =

British boxer (born 1985)

Personal information
- Nickname: The One
- Nationality: British
- Born: 20 August 1985 (age 40) Boston, Lincolnshire, England
- Height: 5 ft 11 1/2 in (182 cm)
- Weight: Light-heavyweight, Cruiserweight

Boxing career
- Reach: 73 in (185 cm)
- Stance: Orthodox

Boxing record
- Total fights: 25
- Wins: 23
- Win by KO: 15
- Losses: 2
Medal record
Men's Boxing
Representing Scotland
Commonwealth Games
Gold medal – first place	2010 Delhi	Light heavyweight
Commonwealth Championships
Silver medal – second place	2010 Delhi	Light heavyweight

Callum Paul Johnson (born 20 August 1985) is a British professional boxer who challenged for the IBF light-heavyweight title in 2018. At regional level, he held the Commonwealth light-heavyweight title from 2016 to 2018 and the British light-heavyweight title in 2018. As an amateur, he won a gold medal at the 2010 Commonwealth Games.

== Amateur career ==
Johnson began boxing at a local club in his home town of Boston from an early age but moved to train at Terry Allen Unique ABC in Lincoln by the time he was 16. He boxed on 120 occasions as an amateur winning 95.

Qualifying through his grandparents, Johnson boxed for Scotland at the 2010 Commonwealth Games in Delhi, defeating Northern Ireland's Thomas McCarthy in the 81kg light heavyweight final to win the gold medal.

== Professional career ==
After the Commonwealth Games, Johnson turned professional, signing with promoter Frank Warren and being managed by former world champion Naseem Hamed.

On 4 December 2010, he made his professional debut at the Braehead Arena in Glasgow, stopping Phillip Townley in the second-round on the undercard of Ricky Burns' world title defence against Andreas Evenson.

Johnson won his first professional title when he claimed the vacant Commonwealth light-heavyweight belt with a ninth-round knockout win over Willbeforce Shihepo at Manchester Arena on 24 September 2016.

He added the British light-heavyweight title to his collection thanks to a spectacular first-round stoppage of defending champion Frank Buglioni on 24 March 2018 at The O2 Arena in London.

On 6 October 2018, Johnson challenged Artur Beterbiev for his IBF world light heavyweight title at Wintrust Arena, Chicago, Illinois. He managed to drop the champion in the second-round with a left hook but Beterbiev recovered quickly and knocked Johnson to the canvas in the fourth round with a big right hand, forcing the referee to stop the fight.

In his next bout, Johnson defeated Sean Monaghan, who was ranked No. 13 by the WBC at light heavyweight, with a third-round technical knockout at Turning Stone Resort Casino, Verona, New York, on 9 March 2019.

On 24 April 2021, he claimed the WBO Global light-heavyweight title with a second-round stoppage of Emil Markic at York Hall in London.

Johnson retained his title via a majority decision win over Server Emurlaev at Arena Birmingham on 9 October 2021 with two of the ringside judges scoring the fight 99–92 and 96–94 in his favour while the third had it a 95–95 draw.

Having not fought for more than a year, Johnson retired from professional boxing in November 2022 but reversed his decision and returned to the ring in December 2023 stepping up in weight divisions to compete at cruiserweight.

His first comeback contest resulted in an opening round stoppage win over Darryl Sharp in Manchester on 8 December 2023, followed by a points victory against Viktar Chvarkou in Grantham, Lincolnshire, on 15 June 2024.

Aged 40 and after another almost two-year break from the competitive boxing ring, Johnson suffered the second defeat of his career against Austine Nnamdi in a six-round bout at The Nest in Nottingham on 25 April 2026. He was knocked to the canvas in the final round, and although he managed to recover and finish the fight, he lost on points.

== Honours ==
Having previously been made an Honorary Freeman of the Borough of Boston, Johnson had a road named after him in his home town of Boston, Lincolnshire, in August 2020.

== Professional boxing record ==
25 fights	23 wins	2 losses
By knockout	15	1
By decision	7	1
By disqualification	1	0

No.	Result	Record	Opponent	Type	Round, time	Date	Location	Notes
25	Loss	23–2	Austine Nnamdi	PTS	6	25 Apr 2026	The Nest, Notts County FC, Nottingham, England	
24	Win	23–1	Viktar Chvarkou	PTS	6	14 Sep 2024	Meres Leisure Centre, Grantham, England	
23	Win	22–1	Viktar Chvarkou	PTS	4	15 Jun 2024	Meres Leisure Centre, Grantham, England	
22	Win	21–1	Darryl Sharp	KO	1 (6)	8 Dec 2023	The Fuse, Partington, Manchester, England	
21	Win	20–1	Server Emurlaev	MD	10	9 Oct 2021	Arena Birmingham, Birmingham, England	Retained WBO Global light-heavyweight title
20	Win	19–1	Emil Markic	TKO	2 (10), 2:37	24 Apr 2021	York Hall, London, England	Won vacant WBO Global light-heavyweight title
19	Win	18–1	Sean Monaghan	TKO	3 (10), 0:23	9 Mar 2019	Turning Stone Resort Casino, Verona, New York, US	
18	Loss	17–1	Artur Beterbiev	KO	4 (12), 2:36	6 Oct 2018	Wintrust Arena, Chicago, Illinois, US	For IBF light-heavyweight title
17	Win	17–0	Frank Buglioni	TKO	1 (12), 1:31	24 Mar 2018	The O2 Arena, London, England	Retained Commonwealth light-heavyweight title; Won British light-heavyweight title
16	Win	16–0	Willbeforce Shihepo	KO	9 (12), 2:07	24 Sep 2016	Manchester Arena, Manchester, England	Won vacant Commonwealth light-heavyweight title
15	Win	15–0	Norbert Szekeres	TKO	1 (6), 2:32	18 Jun 2016	EventCity, Manchester, England	
14	Win	14–0	Richard Horton	TKO	1 (6), 1:18	7 May 2016	Manchester Arena, Manchester, England	
13	Win	13–0	Tsvetozar Iliev	PTS	4	26 Jun 2015	Echo Arena, Liverpool, England	
12	Win	12–0	Jose Manuel Iglesias	KO	1 (6), 1:17	11 Apr 2015	First Direct Arena, Leeds, England	
11	Win	11–0	Bartlomiej Grafka	TKO	2 (8), 1:59	7 Mar 2015	Meres Leisure Centre, Grantham, England	
10	Win	10–0	Josef Obeslo	TKO	1 (6), 3:00	7 Nov 2014	North Kesteven Centre, Lincoln, England	
9	Win	9–0	Luke Allon	TKO	3 (6), 1:39	4 Oct 2014	First Direct Arena, Leeds, England	
8	Win	8–0	Nathan King	PTS	4	27 Jun 2014	Braehead Arena, Glasgow, Scotland	
7	Win	7–0	Egidijus Kakstys	TKO	2 (4), 2:10	17 May 2014	North Kesteven Centre, Lincoln, England	
6	Win	6–0	John Anthony	DQ	7 (8), 2:16	31 May 2013	Town Hall, Walsall, England	Anthony disqualified for persistent holding
5	Win	5–0	James Tucker	TKO	7 (8), 1:18	18 May 2012	Bowlers Exhibition Centre, Manchester, England	
4	Win	4–0	Tommy Tolan	KO	1 (4), 1:30	10 Mar 2012	Braehead Arena, Glasgow, Scotland	
3	Win	3–0	Lee Duncan	PTS	4	16 Jul 2011	Echo Arena, Liverpool, England	
2	Win	2–0	Jody Meikle	PTS	4	12 Mar 2011	Braehead Arena, Glasgow, Scotland	
1	Win	1–0	Phillip Townley	TKO	2 (4), 1:34	4 Dec 2010	Braehead Arena, Glasgow, Scotland	
