= Artur Beterbiev vs. Dmitry Bivol II =

Boxing match

The Last Crescendo
- Date: 22 February 2025
- Venue: The Venue, Riyadh, Saudi Arabia
- Title(s) on the line: WBA (Super), WBC, IBF, WBO, IBO, The Ring and TBRB undisputed light heavyweight titles

Tale of the tape
Boxer	Artur Beterbiev	Dmitry Bivol
Hometown	Khasavyurt, Dagestan, Russia	Tokmok, Chüy, Kyrgyzstan
Purse	≈$10,000,000	≈$10,000,000
Pre-fight record	21–0 (20 KO)	23–1 (12 KO)
Age	40 years, 1 month	34 years, 2 months
Height	5 ft 11 1/2 in (182 cm)	6 ft 0 in (183 cm)
Weight	175 lb (79 kg)	174 lb (79 kg)
Style	Orthodox	Orthodox
Recognition	WBA (Super), WBC, IBF, WBO, IBO, The Ring and TBRB; Undisputed Light Heavyweight Champion; The Ring No. 4 ranked pound-for-pound fighter	WBC/WBA/WBO/The Ring/TBRB; No. 1 Ranked Light Heavyweight; IBF; No. 3 Ranked Light Heavyweight; The Ring No. 5 ranked pound-for-pound fighter Former light heavyweight champion

Result
- Bivol wins by 12-round majority decision (114–114, 116–112, 115–113)

Artur Beterbiev vs. Dmitry Bivol II, billed as The Last Crescendo, was a professional boxing match contested on 22 February 2025, for the undisputed light heavyweight championship.

== Background ==
On 26 November 2024, it was reported that a boxing event was being planned for February 2025, to close off Riyadh Season, with the rematch between Artur Beterbiev and Dmitry Bivol set to co headline the event, along with an IBF heavyweight title fight between Daniel Dubois and Joseph Parker. On 2 December it was announced that the event would be held on 22 February, just four months after Beterbiev edged Bivol to become the first man since Michael Spinks to be recognized as undisputed light heavyweight champion.

Beterbiev explained his main goal was to win all the belts and now his goal was to defend them all, rejecting a mooted bout with former light heavyweight champion Canelo Álvarez.

When asked why he had seemed to have accepted his defeat so well when many others, including his promoter Eddie Hearn, had been more outspoken about the decision Bivol told the press "Because I didn’t like my job, I knew it was some doubt inside my head inside some of the fans, and I want to win always without doubt." Repeating his comments after the first fight, Bivol said during the build up that he would increase his endurance and throw more punches, staying busy throughout the fight. Beterbiev said they both know each other in the ring, but assumed Bivol would have a different game plan heading into the rematch.

The IBF granted an exemption for the fight to take place. The IBF was next in regards to the mandatory rotation according to the WBA and WBO, however WBC President Mauricio Sulaiman stated David Benavidez was next in line.

== The fights ==
=== Buatsi vs. Smith ===
The first bout of the PPV card saw unbeaten light heavyweight contender Joshua Buatsi (Ring/TBRB:3rd) face former super middleweight champion Callum Smith (WBO:7th Ring:6th TBRB:8th).

==== The fight ====
Smith was the busier fighter throughout the bout, landing a number of big shots to the body of Buatsi who struggled to find his rhythm. While Buatsi had moments of success, forcing Smith against the ropes on a few occasions, the slicker work came from Smith.

After 12 bruising and competitive rounds Smith was awarded a unanimous decision victory, with scores of 119–110, 116–112 and 115–113.

==== Aftermath ====
Speaking after the bout Smith said "I was the underdog tonight and it got my back up a little bit that [people said] I'm finished. I feel like I'm good enough to be a two-weight world champion."

Preceded by vs. Willy Hutchinson	Joshua Buatsi's bouts 22 February 2025	Succeeded by vs. Zach Parker
Preceded by vs. Carlos Galvan	Callum Smith's bouts 22 February 2025	Succeeded by vs. TBA

=== Kabayel vs. Zhang ===
Last Crescendo:Agit Kabayel vs. Zhilei Zhang
- Title on the line: WBC interim heavyweight title

Tale of the tape
Boxer	Agit Kabayel	Zhilei Zhang
Nickname		"Big Bang"
Hometown	Leverkusen, North Rhine-Westphalia, Germany	Qianzhangying, Henan Province, China
Pre-fight record	25–0 (18 KO)	27–2–1 (22 KO)
Age	32 years, 4 months	41 years, 9 months
Height	6 ft 3 in (191 cm)	6 ft 6 in (198 cm)
Weight	241 lb (109 kg)	287 1/2 lb (130 kg)
Style	Orthodox	Southpaw
Recognition	WBC; No. 2 Ranked Heavyweight; WBO; No. 3 Ranked Heavyweight; WBA; No. 6 Ranked Heavyweight; The Ring/TBRB; No. 5 Ranked Heavyweight	WBO; No. 1 Ranked Heavyweight; WBC; No. 3 Ranked Heavyweight; WBA; No. 8 Ranked Heavyweight; The Ring/TBRB; No. 4 Ranked Heavyweight

Result
- Kabayel defeats Zhang by 6th round KO

The first of two heavyweight bouts on the card saw unbeaten Agit Kabayel face Zhilei Zhang, with the vacant WBC interim title on the line.

==== The fight ====
The first few rounds saw Kabayel target the body of Zhang although the Chinese fight seemed to be landing the more powerful punches. Kabayel's work rate appeared to be wearing down Zhang but he was dropped in the 5th round with a short left hook to the ear. He beat the count and continue to land body shots. In the next round Kabayel landed a left-right combination to the body that had Zhang slowly sinking to the canvas. Zhang rose to one knee but failed to beat the count.

According to CompuBox Kabayel landed 171 of 346 punches thrown (49.4%) while Zhang landed 79 of his 232 thrown (34.1%).

==== Aftermath ====
Kabayel's win placed him in line for a shot at unified heavyweight champion Oleksandr Usyk.

Preceded by vs. Frank Sánchez	Agit Kabayel's bouts 22 February 2025	Succeeded by vs. Damian Knyba
Preceded by vs. Deontay Wilder	Zhilei Zhang's bouts 22 February 2025	Succeeded by vs. TBA

=== Ortiz Jr vs. Madrimov ===
The third PPV bout saw interim WBC Light middleweight titleist Vergil Ortiz Jr. face former WBA champion Israil Madrimov (WBC: 3rd, WBA: 4th, WBO 7th).

==== The fight ====
Ortiz Jr defeated Madrimov by unanimous decision, with two scores reading 115–113 and one reading 117–111. This was just the second time in Ortiz's career that he went the distance.

ESPN scored the bout 116–112 for Ortiz.

Preceded by vs. Serhii Bohachuk	Vergil Ortiz Jr.'s bouts 22 February 2025	Succeeded by vs. Erickson Lubin
Preceded by vs. Terence Crawford	Israil Madrimov's bouts 22 February 2025	Succeeded by vs. Luis David Salazar

=== Adames vs. Sheeraz ===
The first world title bout on the card saw WBC middleweight champion Carlos Adames (TBRB:2nd Ring:3rd) make his second defence against unbeaten No. 1 contender Hamzah Sheeraz (Ring:2nd TBRB:4th).

==== The fight ====
Sheeraz appeared reluctant to throw punches and tried to utilise his height and reach advantages to outbox the champion behind his jab. Adames however made adjustments in the second half to land more punches cleanly to end the bout on top.

After 12 rounds the fight was ruled a split draw with one judge scoring it 118–110 for Adames, another seeing it 115–114 for Sheeraz, while the third had it a 114–114 draw.

ESPN scored the bout 115–113 for Adames.

==== Aftermath ====
Speaking to Sky Sports in the aftermath, Sheeraz said "I'm an overachiever. I'm very blessed but we'll go back to the drawing board and fix those errors. No excuses, I've got a hand injury but that's got nothing to do with the outcome of the fight."

Preceded by vs. Terrell Gausha	Carlos Adames's bouts 22 February 2025	Succeeded by vs. TBA
Preceded by vs. Tyler Denny	Hamzah Sheeraz's bouts 22 February 2025	Succeeded by vs. Edgar Berlanga

=== Stevenson vs. Padley ===
The second of world title bouts saw WBC lightweight champion Shakur Stevenson face fringe contender Josh Padley (WBC 16th).

==== Background ====
After William Zepeda had defeated Tevin Farmer, it was expected that he would be Stevenson's next opponent, however a week after the fight, Zepeda's head coach told the media that Zepeda suffered an injury to his left arm.

Undefeated lightweight contender Floyd Schofield then made himself available and took to social media to plead to his promoter Oscar De La Hoya to make the fight. Stevenson's promoter Eddie Hearn later confirmed that an offer had been made to Schofield to challenge Stevenson. On December 2, Hearn stated, "We're talking to Golden Boy as well. We've made them an offer, when Shakur was supposed to be fighting Zepeda. All was good for February 22; now they're saying that Zepeda is not ready. [Stevenson] needs an opponent. For me, Schofield has been calling out for a while now."

Speaking at the Ring Magazine awards ceremony on January 11, Stevenson stated he knew what it felt like being in Schofield's position being young and hungry for a world title and wanting to win. Stevenson however said he was too smart and had more experience and this would be his key to winning.

Schofield did not attend the London press conference in January and also missed the ceremonial "grand arrivals" at the start of the fight week. His trainer and father posted a tweet on twitter, which read: “They poisoned my son”, claiming a masseuse had wiped a cream on his body, This post was deleted, but received a response from Stevenson's co-manager Josh Dubin, who threatened legal consequences for defamation. It was later reported that the British Boxing Board of Control had pulled Schofield from the card due to illness, with Moussa Gholam and Josh Padley as potential replacements. A picture was later posted on social media showing Schofield hospitalized.

==== The fight ====
Part-time electrician Padley earned praised for his gutsy performance but he was unable to compete with Stevenson. Padley was dropped three times leading to his corner throwing in the towel in the 9th round.

==== Aftermath ====
Stevenson went on to call out WBA champion Gervonta Davis for a unification bout. Padley was able to quit his day job as an electrician and focus on boxing after a career changing six-figure purse, which was reported to be between £300,000 to £500,000. He was praised by Stevenson for stepping in and later rewarded with a multi-fight promotional deal with Hearn's Matchroom Boxing.

Preceded by vs. Artem Harutyunyan	Shakur Stevenson's bouts 22 February 2025	Succeeded by vs. William Zepeda
Preceded by vs. Mark Chamberlain	Josh Padley's bouts 22 February 2025	Succeeded by vs. Marko Cvetanovic

=== Parker vs. Bakole ===
Last Crescendo:Joseph Parker vs. Martin Bakole
- Title on the line: WBO interim heavyweight title

Tale of the tape
Boxer	Joseph Parker	Martin Bakole
Nickname	"Lupesoliai La'auliolemalietoa"	
Hometown	Auckland, Auckland Region, New Zealand	Kananga, Kasaï-Central, DR Congo
Purse	≈$2,000,000	
Pre-fight record	35–3 (23 KO)	21–1 (16 KO)
Age	33 years, 1 month	31 years, 8 months
Height	6 ft 4 in (193 cm)	6 ft 6 in (198 cm)
Weight	267 lb (121 kg)	310 lb (141 kg)
Style	Orthodox	Orthodox
Recognition	WBO interim Heavyweight Champion; TBRB; No. 2 Ranked Heavyweight; IBF/The Ring; No. 3 Ranked Heavyweight	IBF; No. 1 Ranked Heavyweight; WBA/WBO; No. 2 Ranked Heavyweight; WBC; No. 5 Ranked Heavyweight; The Ring/TBRB; No. 6 Ranked Heavyweight

Result
- Parker defeats Bakole by 2nd round KO

The co main event was originally planned to be an IBF heavyweight world title bout between champion Daniel Dubois and former WBO champion Joseph Parker.

==== Background ====
Following Dubois' stoppage victory over Anthony Joshua, Joshua had opted out of a potential February 2025 rematch due to injuries and the likeliness of not having enough time to prepare. Dubois' promoter Frank Warren confirmed that Dubois would have a title defence in February regardless. The IBF gave Dubois and his team the green light to make a voluntary defence, with Parker seen and the favourite to get the shot. This was confirmed on 2 December.

On 10 January, Ring Magazine reported that Parker would automatically lose his status as WBO interim titleholder once the opening bell rings. This is a standard rule within sanctioning bodies as the interim title is classed as a secondary title and not eligible to unify with full champions from another organisation. The president said they would allow him to enter the ring and be introduced as the interim WBO champion, but would become vacant soon after.

After attending the media workouts on Tuesday, it was reported that Dubois fell ill the following day and that he was being assessed by doctors to see if he would be able to make his title defence against Parker, with Lawrence Okolie, David Adeleye and Mourad Aliev were brought up as a possible replacement if he had to pull out. Dubois was absent from the press conference, but Parker still attended. Shortly afterwards, Martin Bakole was named as the replacement, having to fly in from DR Congo.

==== The fight ====
In the 2nd round an overhand counter-right from Parker landed on the top of Bakole's head, which had caused to lose his balance sent him to the canvas. Bakole beat the count but his trainer Billy Nelson threw in the towel, giving Parker a TKO victory.

==== Aftermath ====
After the fight Parker called out Oleksandr Usyk and Dubios, asking who he had to face to get a title shot.

Preceded by vs. Zhilei Zhang	Joseph Parker's bouts 22 February 2025	Succeeded by vs. Fabio Wardley
Preceded by vs. Jared Anderson	Martin Bakole's bouts 22 February 2025	Succeeded by vs. Efe Ajagba

=== Main event ===
The bout was another tactical chess fight, with Bivol appearing to be more relaxed and showing greater patience than the first bout, using combinations, superior hand speed and movement. Beterbiev wasn't able to cut off the ring as well but still had his moments, landing hard shots when in range. Bivol established his jab to counter Beterbiev. From the third round Beterbiev looked to take over as Bivol's output had reduced and the champion was able to outland him. After the seventh round Beterbiev's pace slowed down and Bivol began to use his movement and circle around, landing crisp combinations. In the tenth, Beterbiev did the better work, until Bivol landed some combinations to end the round strong. Before the final round, Beterbiev's corner told him he needed to win the round for any chance to win the fight. He stalked Bivol and managed to open up a cut on Bivol's left eyebrow.

After 12 rounds, one judge scored the bout 114–114, with the other two judges overriding that score with 116–112 and 115–113 for Bivol to crown him the new undisputed champion. He was the first man to dethrone an undisputed champion since Carlos Baldomir defeated Zab Judah in 2006.

== Aftermath ==
After the fight Bivol said, "I'm just so happy. I went through a lot the last year and this is so exciting. I was better, I was pushing myself more. I was more confident, I was lighter. I just wanted to win so much today." Beterbiev responded to the outcome stating "I don't want to talk about the decision, I just want to say congrats to Bivol. I think this fight was better than the first fight but now it's my time to come back", leading to speculation there will be a trilogy fight. CompuBox showed a significant change in output for Bivol compared to the first bout. He was credited in landing 170 of 574 punches thrown (31.1%), while Beterbiev landed 121 of his 688 thrown (17.6%). Bivol landed more than Beterbiev in 9 of the 12 rounds.

The fight was widely praised with former HBO Boxing commentator Jim Lampley saying, "People ask me, ‘Does it rise to the level of Gatti-Ward and Barrera-Morales in terms of the intensity of the combat? I say yes.". Eddie Hearn would later claim that the bout was the best fight he had ever seen live. He also felt, Bivol would win the trilogy more convincingly.

== Undercard ==
Confirmed bouts:

Weight class		vs		Method	Round	Time	Notes
Main Card (PPV)
Light heavyweight	Dmitry Bivol	def.	Artur Beterbiev (c)	MD	12		^{Note 1}
Heavyweight	Joseph Parker (c)	def.	Martin Bakole	TKO	2/12	2:17	^{Note 2}
Lightweight	Shakur Stevenson (c)	def.	Josh Padley	TKO	9/12	3:00	^{Note 3}
Middleweight	Carlos Adames (c)	vs.	Hamzah Sheeraz	SD	12		^{Note 4}
Light middleweight	Vergil Ortiz Jr. (c)	def.	Israil Madrimov	UD	12		^{Note 5}
Heavyweight	Agit Kabayel	def.	Zhilei Zhang	KO	6/12	2:29	^{Note 6}
Light heavyweight	Callum Smith	def.	Joshua Buatsi	UD	12		^{Note 7}
Preliminary Card
Lightweight	Mohammed Alakel	def.	Engel Gomez	PTS	6
Light welterweight	Ziyad Almaayouf	def.	Jonatas Oliveira	PTS	6

^Note 1 For WBA (Super), WBC, IBF, WBO, IBO and The Ring Light heavyweight titles
^Note 2 For WBO interim heavyweight title
^Note 3 For WBC lightweight title
^Note 4 For WBC middleweight title
^Note 5 For WBC interim light middleweight title
^Note 6 For WBC interim heavyweight title
^Note 7 For WBO interim light heavyweight title

== Broadcasting ==
Country	Broadcaster
Worldwide	DAZN
Russia	Channel One

Preceded by First fight	Artur Beterbiev's bouts 22 February 2025	Succeeded by vs. Deon Nicholson
Preceded by First fight	Dmitry Bivol's bouts 22 February 2025	Succeeded by vs. TBA
