= Anthony Joshua vs. Francis Ngannou =

Boxing match

Knockout Chaos
- Date: 8 March 2024
- Venue: Kingdom Arena, Riyadh, Saudi Arabia

Tale of the tape
| Boxer | Anthony Joshua | Francis Ngannou |
| Nickname | AJ | The Predator |
| Hometown | Watford, Hertfordshire, UK | Batié, Hauts-Plateaux, Cameroon |
| Pre-fight record | 27–3 (24 KO) | 0–1 (Boxing); 17–3 (12 KO) (MMA) |
| Age | 34 years, 4 months | 37 years, 6 months |
| Height | 6 ft 6 in (198 cm) | 6 ft 4 in (193 cm) |
| Weight | 252 1/2 lb (115 kg) | 272 1/2 lb (124 kg) |
| Style | Orthodox | Orthodox |
| Recognition | WBC/WBO; No. 1 Ranked Heavyweight; WBA/IBF/The Ring; No. 2 Ranked Heavyweight; TBRB; No. 3 Ranked Heavyweight; Former 2 time unified heavyweight champion | WBC; No. 10 Ranked Heavyweight; Former UFC Heavyweight Champion |

Result
- Joshua wins via 2nd-round KO

Anthony Joshua vs. Francis Ngannou, billed as Knockout Chaos, was a professional crossover boxing match between 2-time former unified heavyweight champion Anthony Joshua and former UFC heavyweight champion Francis Ngannou.

== Background ==
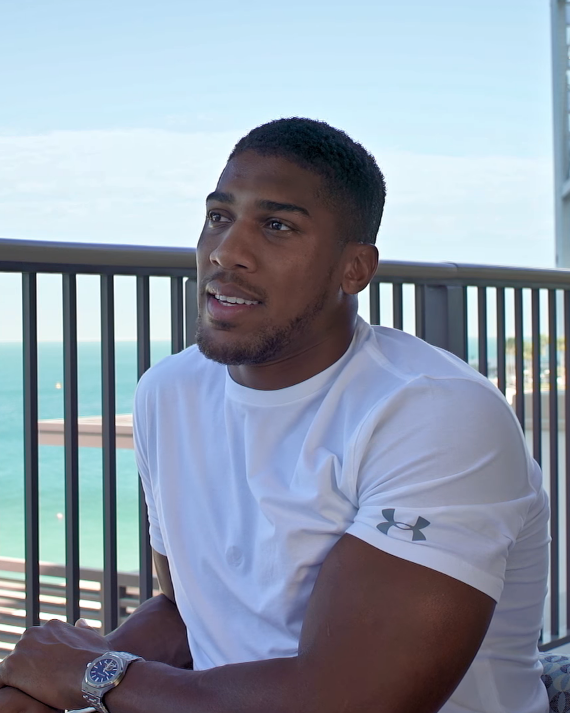
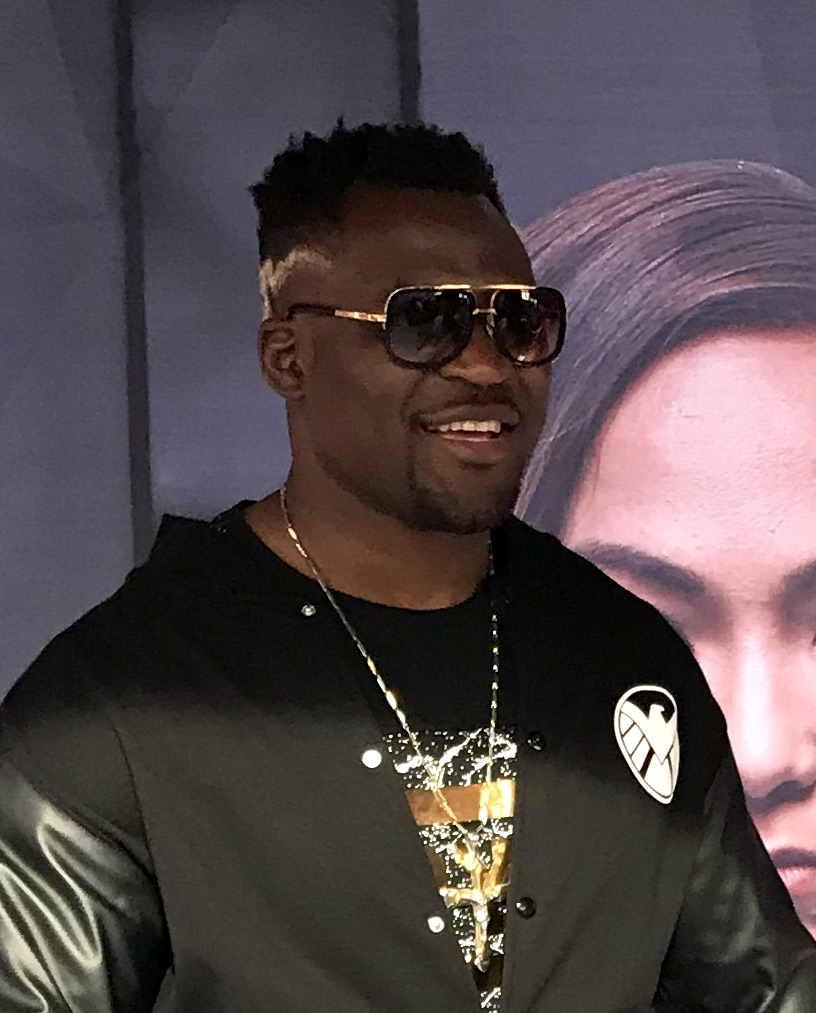
Anthony Joshua (left) and Francis Ngannou (right)

Following his impressive stoppage of Otto Wallin in December 2023, Anthony Joshua was linked with IBF number one ranked Filip Hrgović or WBO "interim" titleholder Zhilei Zhang. However in January 2024 it was confirmed that he would face former UFC champion Francis Ngannou, who in his only previous boxing bout scored a knockdown against WBC and Lineal champion Tyson Fury before losing a somewhat controversial split decision.

== The fights ==
=== Undercard ===
The undercard saw wins for Justis Huni and Mark Chamberlain.

=== Madrimov vs. Kurbanov ===
The first of two world title bouts on the card saw Israil Madrimov stop Magomed Kurbanov to win the vacant WBA Super Welterweight belt.

| Preceded by vs. Raphael Igbokwe | Israil Madrimov's bouts 8 March 2024 | Succeeded by vs. Terence Crawford |
| Preceded by vs. Michel Soro | Magomed Kurbanov's bouts 8 March 2024 | Succeeded by vs. TBA |

=== Vargas vs. Ball ===
This was followed by Nick Ball challenging WBC featherweight champion Rey Vargas.

==== The fight ====
After twice flooring the champion (once appearing to push him before handing a left hook) the bout was ruled a draw with scores of 116–110 for Ball, 114–112 for Vargas and 113–113.

According to CompuBox Ball landed with 111 of 472 punches thrown (23.5% connect rate) compared to 118 of 536 (22.0% connect rate) from Vargas.

==== Aftermath ====
Speaking after the bout to DAZN Ball said "I had two knockdowns and was putting the pressure on for the whole fight. I was the aggressor and thought I did enough to win it. It's a bit frustrating but that's how it is. I can't get angry at it." Meanwhile his promoter Frank Warren said "Nick Ball should be a world champion tonight and will no doubt be in the very near future."

| Preceded by vs. O'Shaquie Foster | Rey Vargas's bouts 8 March 2024 | Succeeded by vs. TBA |
| Preceded by vs. Isaac Dogboe | Nick Ball's bouts 8 March 2024 | Succeeded by vs. Raymond Ford |

=== Zhang vs. Parker ===
Knockout Chaos: Zhilei Zhang vs. Joseph Parker
- Title(s) on the line: WBO interim heavyweight title

Tale of the tape
| Boxer | (China) Zhilei Zhang | (New Zealand) Joseph Parker |
| Nickname | "Big Bang" | "Lupesoliai La'auliolemalietoa" |
| Hometown | Zhoukou, Henan, China | Auckland, Auckland Region, New Zealand |
| Pre-fight record | 26–1–1 (21 KOs) | 34–3 (23 KOs) |
| Age | 40 years, 10 months | 32 years, 1 month |
| Height | 6 ft 6 in (198 cm) | 6 ft 4 in (193 cm) |
| Weight | 291 1/2 lb (132 kg) | 247 1/2 lb (112 kg) |
| Style | Southpaw | Orthodox |
| Recognition | WBO; Interim Heavyweight Champion; TBRB; No. 2 Ranked Heavyweight; The Ring; No. 3 Ranked Heavyweight | WBO; No. 2 Ranked Heavyweight; WBA/WBC; No. 3 Ranked Heavyweight; The Ring/TBRB; No. 4 Ranked Heavyweight |

Result
- Parker wins via 12th-round MD

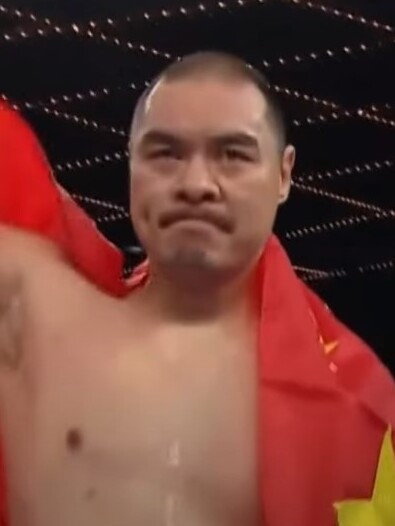
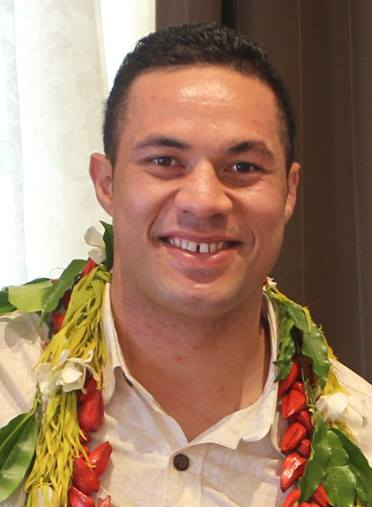
Zhilei Zhang (left) and Joseph Parker (right)

In the chief support WBO "Interim" titleholder Zhilei Zhang faced former WBO heavyweight champion Joseph Parker (WBO: 2nd WBC / WBA: 3rd).

==== The fight ====
Parker was dropped twice in the bout, once in 3rd with a left hand and once in the 8th with a left-right hook combination. However Zhang's lack of output compared to Parker cost him, as two of the judges scored it for Parker 114–112 & 115–111, with the third having it 113–113.

According to CompuBox Parker outlanded Zhang, landing with 101 of 349 punches thrown (28.9% connect rate) compared to 75 of 273 (27.4% connect rate) from Zhang.

==== Aftermath ====
Speaking after the bout Parker said "This is a great win. Zhang is a tough man, knocked me down twice. ... I'm very happy. .... We have a rematch [clause], so we're gonna do it again."

Zhang's co-manager Terry Lane suggested that he would activate the rematch clause.

| Preceded by vs. Joe Joyce II | Zhilei Zhang's bouts 8 March 2024 | Succeeded by vs. Deontay Wilder |
| Preceded by vs. Deontay Wilder | Joseph Parker's bouts 8 March 2024 | Succeeded by ~~vs. Daniel Dubois~~ vs. Martin Bakole |

=== Main Event ===
Joshua dominated the bout, knocking down Ngannou after Ngannou switched to southpaw in the last minute of the 1st round, with a straight right hand (a punch often dubbed as the 'southpaw killer'). Ngannou beat the count and reverted to orthodox but was floored again in the 2nd. He again rose to his feet, but Joshua finished the fight with another right hand that left Ngannou flat on the canvas for several minutes afterwards.

== Aftermath ==
Speaking in the ring after the bout promoter Eddie Hearn said "You’re looking at the number one heavyweight in the world, unquestionably. On this form, there is no man in the world that can beat him in the heavyweight division," before stating his desire for Joshua to face the winner of the planned May 18 bout between Tyson Fury and Oleksandr Usyk.

Ngannou later confirmed that he will continue boxing despite the loss. However he dropped out of the top twenty rankings of WBC due to his second straight loss.

== Fight card ==
Confirmed bouts:

| Weight Class | | vs. | | Method | Round | Time | Notes |
Main Card
| Heavyweight | (United Kingdom) Anthony Joshua | def. | (Cameroon) Francis Ngannou | KO | 2 (10) | 2:38 |
| Heavyweight | (New Zealand) Joseph Parker | def. | (China) Zhilei Zhang (c) | MD | 12 | | ^{Note 1} |
| Featherweight | (Mexico) Rey Vargas (c) | vs. | (United Kingdom) Nick Ball | SD | 12 | | ^{Note 2} |
| Super Welterweight | (Uzbekistan) Israil Madrimov | def. | (Russia) Magomed Kurbanov | TKO | 5 (12) | 2:20 | ^{Note 3} |
| Lightweight | (United Kingdom) Mark Chamberlain | def. | (United Kingdom) Gavin Gwynne | TKO | 4 (10) | 2:48 | ^{Note 4} |
| Heavyweight | (Australia) Justis Huni | def. | (South Africa) Kevin Lerena | UD | 10 | | ^{Note 5} |
| Super Welterweight | (United Kingdom) Louis Greene | def. | (United Kingdom) Jack McGann | TKO | 1 (10) | 1:29 |
| Heavyweight | (United Kingdom) Roman Fury | def. | (Czech Republic) Martin Svarc | PTS | 4 |
| Super Lightweight | (Saudi Arabia) Ziyad Almaayouf | def. | (Mexico) Christian Lopez Flores | PTS | 6 |
| Heavyweight | (Ukraine) Andrii Novytskyi | def. | (United States) Juan Torres | KO | 3 (8) | 2:43 |

^Note 1 For WBO interim heavyweight title
^Note 2 For WBC featherweight title
^Note 3 For WBA super-welterweight title
^Note 4 For WBA Inter-continental lightweight title
^Note 5 For WBO Global heavyweight title

| Preceded by vs. Otto Wallin | Anthony Joshua's bouts 8 March 2024 | Succeeded by vs. Daniel Dubois |
| Preceded by vs. Tyson Fury | Francis Ngannou's bouts 8 March 2024 | Succeeded by TBA |
