= Zhilei Zhang vs Joe Joyce II =

2023 professional boxing match in London

An Eye for An Eye
- Date: 23 September 2023
- Venue: Wembley Arena, Wembley, London, UK
- Title on the line: WBO interim heavyweight title

Tale of the tape
Boxer	(China) Zhilei Zhang	(United Kingdom) Joe Joyce
Nickname	"Big Bang"	"Juggernaut"
Hometown	Zhoukou, Henan, China	Putney, London, UK
Pre-fight record	25–1–1 (20 KOs)	15–1 (14 KOs)
Age	40 years, 4 months	38 years
Height	6 ft 6 in (198 cm)	6 ft 6 in (198 cm)
Weight	287 1/4 lb (130 kg)	281 1/4 lb (128 kg)
Style	Southpaw	Orthodox
Recognition	WBO; Interim Heavyweight Champion; The Ring; No. 4 Ranked Heavyweight; TBRB; No. 5 Ranked Heavyweight	WBO; No. 7 Ranked Heavyweight; The Ring/TBRB; No. 6 Ranked Heavyweight

Result
- Zhang wins via 3rd-round KO

Zhilei Zhang vs. Joe Joyce II, billed as An Eye for An Eye, was a professional boxing match contested on 23 September 2023 for the WBO interim heavyweight title.

== Background ==
A week after the loss, with a rematch clause in place, Joyce advised that he may take another fight in the interim before having a rematch with Zhang. A decision was to be made by team Joyce, dependant on how well the recovery of Joyce's eye injury came along. Joyce stated although the eye was badly bruised, it did not impair his vision and he could still see.

Speaking to IFL TV, Zhang said he respected Joyce more after sharing the ring with him. He praised Joyce's toughness and constant pressure in the ring and welcomed a rematch. Had Joyce not activated the immediate rematch clause, Zhang would have options. Part of the deal for the first bout with Zhang winning, would see him promoted under the Queensberry Promotions banner for the foreseeable. Zhang's co-manager Terry Lane confirmed this.

On 12 June 2023, Zhang confirmed he would defend his interim WBO heavyweight title in a rematch against Joyce, after Joyce activated the rematch clause. The rematch was scheduled to take place at the OVO Arena Wembley in London on 2 September on BT Sport in the UK and ESPN+ in the United States. On 29 June, a press release confirmed all the details of the fight, with the card taking place on the newly rebranded TNT Sport, following the joint venture between BT Group and Warner Bros. Discovery EMEA. Joyce said he had learned from his previous mistakes. Zhang said he would approach this fight as if he had never fought Joyce before and make history again. Due to the heavyweight mandatory rotation system, the WBO were yet to call. Current unified champion Oleksandr Usyk was scheduled to defend his titles against Daniel Dubois in August 2023. A win for Joyce meant he would become next in line to challenge the winner.

Joyce previously stated he overlooked Zhang in their first meeting. Trainer Ismail Salas admitted even he overlooked Zhang, but promised the rematch would be different. A week before the fight, Zhang downplayed Joyce's power, saying it was not as he had imagined. Zhang said he enjoyed being in the ring with Joyce, as Joyce did not move his head much and switch his angles, thus making him an easy target. One of the reasons he kept landing his left hand. For the rematch, the three judges were from South Africa, China, and England. Steve Gray was chosen to referee the bout. Despite the mixture of judges, Zhang's trainer Shaun George still did not believe they should leave it to the judges and planned to get a consecutive stoppage win. This was because Zhang was only ahead by one round on two judges scorecards and one judge had Joyce ahead by one round in their first fight. Joyce was a 9-1 favourite going into the first fight. For the rematch, Zhang was the favourite, only slightly. Despite this, George expected the same result as the first fight.

== Weigh in ==
At the weigh in, Joyce weighed a career-high 281.2 pounds. He was 25.2 pounds heavier than the previous fight. Zhang also weighed a career-high 287 pounds, 9 pounds heavier than previously. Despite the extra weight, Joyce assured it would not affect his speed.

== The fight ==
In front of a stunned crowd, Zhang stopped Joyce in third round, in what was described as a highlight reel right hook knockout. Zhang was more dominant in the rematch than the first fight. By the end of round 2, Joyce had swelling under both his eyes, again caused by hard shots, which Joyce was unable to avoid. The end came in round 3 when Joyce attempted to throw a right hand. Zhang, seeing this coming, landed a sharp right hook of his own, landing clean and dropped Joyce face first onto the canvas. Joyce stayed on the canvas for a few moments before trying to get up. However, the fight was stopped as Joyce got to his feet. The time of the stoppage was at 3:07 of round three. After the fight, Warren said Joyce would need to consider retirement following back-to-back defeats as it would be a hard journey back to mandatory status.

Joyce said he would come again and retirement was not an option. He took on the challenges he believes he did not need to take, considering the position he was in. Joyce stated he was open to a possible rematch with Daniel Dubois, who in August, was stopped in his attempt to capture the world titles from Usyk.

=== Compubox ===
Zhang landed 39 of his 104 punches thrown (36.5%), 29 of them being power shots. Joyce landed only 16 of his 133 thrown (12%) with 10 of them being jabs.

== Aftermath ==
Speaking after the bout Zhang called out Tyson Fury, saying ringside: “To the audience, I want to ask you a question: Do you want to see me shut Tyson Fury up?”

Rumours circulated following Frank Warren's comments, that he had given up on Joyce. Warren hit back at these claims to suggest his words were misconstrued and re-iterated that he would stand by Joyce, just as he has stood by previous boxers under him who suffered setbacks, namely Daniel Dubois more recently. Warren said it Joyce continued his career, he would remain under the Queensberry banner and matched with top 10 ranked heavyweights with the different organisations, in order to help him climb back up the rankings.

== Fight card ==
Confirmed bouts:

Weight class		vs		Method	Round	Time	Notes
Main Card
Heavyweight	Zhilei Zhang	def	Joe Joyce	KO	3 (12)	3:07	^{Note 1}
Light heavyweight	Anthony Yarde	def	Jorge Silva	KO	2 (10)	2:07
Heavyweight	Moses Itauma	def	Amine Boucetta	TKO	1 (6)	1:33
Super lightweight	Pierce O'Leary	def	Kane Gardner	UD	10		^{Note 2}
Super middleweight	Zach Parker	def	Khalid Graidia	RTD	7 (10)	3:00
Super featherweight	Royston Barney-Smith	def	Engel Gomez	PTS	6
Preliminary bouts
Light heavyweight	Ezra Taylor	def	Joel McIntyre	TKO	8 (8)	2:59
Cruiserweight	Tommy Fletcher	def	Alberto Tapia	TKO	6 (6)	1:28
Welterweight	Sean Noakes	def	Lukasz Barabasz	PTS	6	1:28
Floater bouts
Cruiserweight	Aloys Youmbi	def	Erik Nazaryan	KO	1 (6)	0:38

^Note 1 For WBO interim heavyweight title
^Note 2 For WBC International Super Light Title

== Broadcasting ==
Country	Broadcaster
United Kingdom	TNT Sports
United States	ESPN+

Preceded by First Fight	Zhilei Zhang' bouts 23 September 2023	Succeeded by vs. Joseph Parker
Preceded by First Fight	Joe Joyce's bouts 23 September 2023	Succeeded by vs. Kash Ali
