= Zhilei Zhang =

Chinese boxer (born 1983)

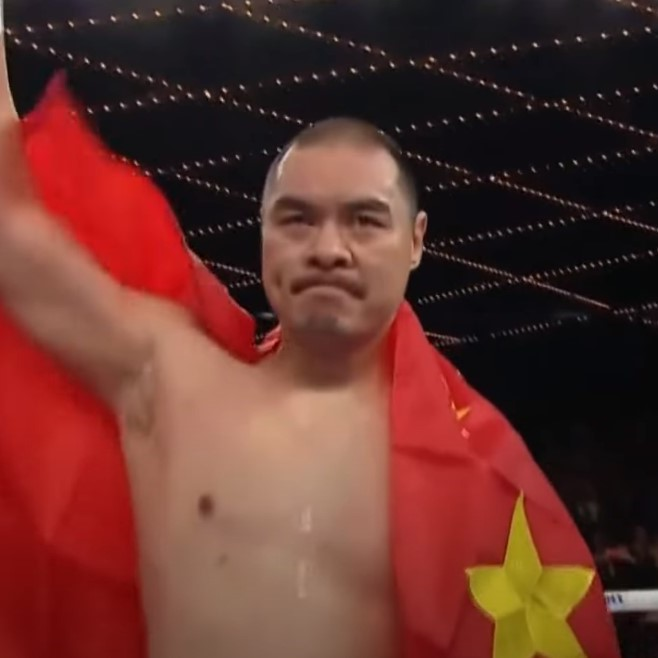
- Zhang in 2021

Personal information
- Nickname: Big Bang
- Born: 张志磊; May 2, 1983 (age 43) Qianzhangying, Shenqiu County, Zhoukou, Henan Province, China
- Height: 1.98 m (6 ft 6 in)
- Weight: Heavyweight

Boxing career
- Reach: 203 cm (80 in)
- Stance: Southpaw

Boxing record
- Total fights: 31
- Wins: 27
- Win by KO: 22
- Losses: 3
- Draws: 1
Medal record
Men's amateur boxing
Representing China
Olympic Games
Silver medal – second place	2008 Beijing	Super-heavyweight
World Championships
Bronze medal – third place	2007 Chicago	Super-heavyweight
Bronze medal – third place	2009 Milan	Super-heavyweight
World Combat Games
Gold medal – first place	2010 Beijing	Super-heavyweight
World University Games
Silver medal – second place	2004 Antalya	Super-heavyweight
Asian Games
Gold medal – first place	2010 Guangzhou	Super Heavyweight
Asian Championships
Gold medal – first place	2009 Zhuhai	Super-heavyweight
Silver medal – second place	2007 Ulan Bator	Super-heavyweight
Bronze medal – third place	2004 Puerto Princesa	Super-heavyweight
Bronze medal – third place	2011 Incheon	Super-heavyweight

Zhilei Zhang (Chinese: 张志磊; pinyin: Zhāng Zhìlěi; born May 2, 1983) is a Chinese professional boxer. He held the World Boxing Organization (WBO) interim heavyweight title from 2023 to 2024. As an amateur, he won a bronze medal at the 2004, 2011, silver at the 2007, and gold at the 2009 Asian Championships; gold at the 2010 Asian Games; bronze at the 2007 and 2009 World Championships; and silver at the 2008 Olympics.

As of October 2025, Zhang is ranked as the world's seventh-best active heavyweight by The Ring magazine. He was named Professional Boxer of the Year by the New Jersey Boxing Hall of Fame in 2023 and 2024.

== Early life ==
Zhang was born on May 2, 1983, in Qianzhangying village, Shicaoji Township, Shenqiu County, Zhoukou, Henan Province, China. Zhang is the tallest member of his family. By 15 years of age, he was 1.95 meters tall and weighed 120 kg. His father, Zhang Tan (1948–2020), was 1.76 meters tall while his mother, Deng Yuying stood slightly over 1.6 meters tall. His elder brother and elder sister are also of close to average height.

In 2020, while Zhang made a rare visit back home the day after Chinese New Year, his father died of a sudden cardiac arrest at home during COVID-19 lockdown in China. Zhang mistakenly believed his father to be choking and attempted the Heimlich maneuver to no avail.

At age seven, Zhang and his father moved to downtown Shenqiu County for educational reasons. Zhang later attended Shenqiu's Huaidian Hui Town No.3 Middle School. His father enrolled him in canoe sprinting lessons in order for him to lose weight. The Zhoukou region was a hotbed of watersports in the 1990s, with Olympic rower Mu Suli, born the same year as Zhang, growing up in a different part of Zhoukou during the 1990s.

In 1995, Zhang was called up to the Shenqiu County canoe sprinting team by coach Li Guofeng. When Zhang injured his leg during a tryout for the provincial canoe sprinting team, he was referred to the provincial boxing coach Gu Ganqing. In 1998, Gu signed him to the Combat and Weightlifting Center in the Henan Provincial Department of Sports, headed by center chief Li Yan in Shangjie. From 1998 until he was released from his sporting obligations, he was coached by Gu. This was the first time Zhang had lived away from his family.

== Amateur career ==
After winning third place in the unlimited weight class in boxing in the 2001 National Games of China, he was called in as a sparring partner for the Chinese national boxing team in 2002. In 2003, he lost 22:8 in the first round of the 2003 World Amateur Boxing Championships to Grzegorz Kiełsa. At the 2004 World University Boxing Championships, he lost in the final to Rustam Saidov. Zhang enrolled at Zhengzhou University in 2005 and graduated in 2009 majoring in sports training. At the 2005 World Amateur Boxing Championships in China, he beat Vugar Alekperov 20:11 before losing to eventual champion Odlanier Solis (17:7).

He took third place at the 2007 World Amateur Boxing Championships in Chicago, thus qualifying for boxing at the 2008 Beijing Olympics, where he won a silver medal. His fight was the last event of the 2008 Olympics. His coaches were disappointed he missed the publicity that would have accompanied the final gold medal for China. Despite that, he attracted a lot of attention by being the first Asian to win an Olympic medal in the unlimited weight class. At the 2012 Olympics, he was defeated on points in the quarterfinal by Anthony Joshua, the future unified heavyweight world champion.

=== Highlights ===
Olympic Games
2008 Olympics (as a Super heavyweight)
- Defeated Mohamed Amanissi (Morocco) 15-0
- Defeated Ruslan Myrsatayev (Kazakhstan) 12-2
- Defeated Vyacheslav Glazkov (Ukraine) walk-over
- Lost to Roberto Cammarelle (Italy) RSCO.
2012 Olympics (as a Super heavyweight)
- Defeated Johan Linde (Australia) RSCO
- Lost to Anthony Joshua (Great Britain) 11-15

World Championships
2003 World Amateur Boxing Championships (as a Super heavyweight)
- Lost to Grzegorz Kiełsa (Poland) 8-22.
2005 World Amateur Boxing Championships (as a Super heavyweight)
- Defeated Vugar Alekperov (Azerbaijan) 20-11.
- Lost to Odlanier Solis (Cuba) 7-17.
2007 World Amateur Boxing Championships (as a Super heavyweight)
- Defeated Nurpais Torobekov (Kyrgyzstan) RSCO.
- Defeated Rustam Rygebayev (Kazakhstan) 20-10.
- Defeated Daniel Beahan (Australia) KO 2.
- Lost to Vyacheslav Glazkov (Ukraine) 11-21.
2009 World Amateur Boxing Championships (as a Super heavyweight)
- Defeated Primislav Dimovski (North Macedonia) 6-2.
- Lost to Roman Kapitanenko (Ukraine) 2-5.

== Professional career ==
=== Early career ===
Zhang was highly regarded by American promoters by 2009 but his career stalled between 2009 and 2019 owing to a combination of his duties to Chinese national boxing obligations, mismanagement and accompanying legal issues, and his visa problems. Until Zhang signed with Matchroom Sport USA in 2020 at 37 years of age, he was excluded from boxing's top ranks.

Zhang considered turning professional at 25 years of age after the 2008 Olympics, but could not until 2014. Dino Duva and Don King were the first promoters to approach Zhang. In August 2009, Duva and King arranged for Zhang to train at the Poconos. In September 2010, Duva arranged for Zhang to train in the Poconos to prepare him for the 2010 Asian Games. The highlight of that training were 11 bouts between the Chinese and American national boxing teams in Manhattan promoted as "Empires Collide", which Zhang defeated Danny Kelly Jr 16:8 in the main fight. Zhang dominated in all domestic amateur heavyweight competitions from 2005 until 2013. He was finally released by the Henan Provincial Combat and Weightlifting Center after he competed in the 2012 Olympics and won the gold medal for 2013 National Games of China.

Before 2014, Zhang was a typical product of the Chinese state-centric sports development policy known as juguo tizhi (举国体制), with all his training schedule, coaching, insurance, housing, and meals arranged and paid for by the Henan Provincial Combat and Weightlifting Center. Hence, few Chinese boxers turn pro. The Henan Provincial Department of Sports secured public institution positions for athletes like Zhang should they retire in China.

When he moved to the United States on March 8, 2014, he had to manage and self-finance aspects of his life which had previously been handled by the Henan Provincial Combat and Weightlifting Center. Cooking for himself was the biggest challenge of his early days in the US. In his first few months as a professional, he spent more time learning how to properly cook noodles than he did working in the ring.

Zhang was housemates with middleweight Meng Fanlong and lightweight Wang Zhimin in New Jersey when he first came to the US. Along with Zou Shiming, these four were the first wave of boxers ever released by the Chinese authorities to turn professional.

Zhang trained in Nutley, New Jersey. At his first training, he embarrassed himself by introducing himself as the 2008 Olympic silver medalist, which was met with silence and not appreciated.

Zhang's slow rise to prominence was also partly the result of the debacle that saw his first and second promotional companies go out of business in 2014 and 2020 respectively and the legal chaos that followed.

After the 2008 Olympics, Dino Duva built relationships with the National Boxing and Taekwondo Center of the Department of Sports of China and obtained exclusive rights to market all Chinese boxers. As a result, Chinese boxers had little freedom to choose an alternative promoter. On March 10, 2014, the 31-year-old Zhang signed a four-year contract with Dynasty Boxing, a company 50% owned by Duva. Zhang was Dynasty's first signing, and Zhang had only one fight under Dynasty Boxing. Dynasty went bankrupt and closed down in December 2014.

In 2015, Zhang was signed to Roc Nation Sports, which Dino Duva also joined as an employee and boxing executive. Roc Nation, a music promoter, entered the boxing market in August 2014 with money but no plan. David Itskowitch, Roc Nation's founding chief operating officer of boxing, abruptly resigned in July 2016 and Duva's influence grew after. Roc Nation's boxing division was in quick decline from 2018, all but ceased working in 2019 and closed down in 2020.

Zhang's commercialization was also hampered when CSI Entertainment, the broadcaster that signed an agreement in 2014 with Dynasty Boxing before the latter went bankrupt, disputed Roc Nation's broadcasting rights in Asia. Roc Nation was temporarily restrained from broadcasting in Asia from June 2015. The New York Supreme Court only called off the temporary restraining order two years later in June 2017. The court also denied Duva's motion to dismiss CSI Entertainment's complaint.

In 2019, a year before the official closure of Roc Nation's boxing division, the Lane brothers negotiated Zhang's release with Matchroom Boxing USA, which Duva, again, had cut a deal with. In 2024, Zhang's co-manager recalled his promoter tried to stop him leaving by intimidation, dragging him into legal battles and refusing to line him up in fights. Brothers Tommy and Terry Lane, sons of boxing referee Mills Lane, joined Zhang as advisers and helped guide him out of trouble. It was not clear whether this incident was referring to Zhang's termination of contract in November 2014 or in 2019.

Zhang could not access high-profile matches to make himself known under Roc Nation until they parted ways in 2019. Zhang won 19 back-to-back low-profile fights under the Roc Nation banner. Zhang wanted better-known, tougher opponents with bigger payouts, but Dino Duva didn't do it. Zhang was particularly upset once when his promoter organized a match at a high school basketball court with a portable dressing room which spectators could see into. Zhang felt he was not taken seriously by his promoter. He was paid around $7,000 for his pro debut, and some of his earlier pro fights were paid $2000 and $5000. When Shawn George became Zhang's head coach in 2017, George was upset by how the promoters saw Zhang as a novelty act along the lines of Nikolai Valuev. Dynasty Boxing's minority owners, brothers Tommy and Terry Lane, believed Zhang would become "the Yao Ming of boxing" and clashed with Duva over his lackluster promotion of Zhang.

In his pro debut on August 8, 2014, the original opponent dropped out a week before the bout. Zhang knocked out his replacement, Curtis Tate, in the opening 17 seconds of round one. Roc Nation's boxing division was so quiet in 2019 that Zhang's last match under Roc Nation on November 30 that year with Andriy Rudenko was in fact promoted by Matchroom Sport USA, which went on to sign Zhang the next year. The fight had originally been scheduled for November 2018 by Matchroom Sport but Zhang missed out because of visa problems.

Apart from the belated release from the Chinese boxing authorities and the promotional companies' fiasco, Zhang's peak years were also squandered because of visa troubles as a Chinese citizen which led to the cancellation of several bouts. While he stuck outside the U.S., his form dropped as he could not train as he usually did.

After moving to the United States in 2014, Zhang rarely visited China to see his parents, wife and son (born 2010) because he had to reapply for single-entry working visa every time. After a fight in China, he failed to get a visa and was stuck there for ten months between October 2018 and July 2019, missing a fight with Andriy Rudenko scheduled for November 2018 in Monaco. He was stuck for too long and asked his manager to terminate his housing lease and sell his car in New Jersey. He missed another fight scheduled in March 2020 in the United States after attending his father's funeral. His flight scheduled for February 3, 2020, was two days after the United States implemented a COVID-19 travel ban on Chinese citizens. The 37-year-old Zhang had to wait another eight months for his next bout on November 7, 2020, with Devin Vargas on the undercard of the WBC lightweight title fight between Devin Haney and Yuriorkis Gamboa.

Zhang's majority draw with Jerry Forrest on February 27, 2021, was a landmark moment in his career not because it was the first fight he did not win (22–0–1), but because it finally highlighted how poor his nutrition was. After the fight he was hospitalized. When he woke up in the ambulance, he had no recollections from the sixth round onwards and his first words were asking whether he won or lost the fight. He was diagnosed with iron-deficiency anemia, high enzyme levels, low-level renal failure, electrolyte disorder, liver dysfunction and severe dehydration.

Zhang later found out various errors in his preparations. During his one-week COVID-19 quarantine in Miami before the bout, the hotel provided him only two meals a day. Unfamiliar with Miami's high humidity, Zhang's water intake during his stay at hotel was insufficient and he suffered from severe dehydration. Compounded by a drop in fitness from staying in the hotel during quarantine, he lost 9 pounds. Zhang had been unconcerned with his weight loss since it was not an issue in the unlimited weight class. His doctor also concluded that his excessive consumption of Chinese tea during training was partially responsible for his iron-deficiency anemia. When Zhang was discharged from hospital, his first words to his managers were the Chinese idiom, fang hu gui shan, lit. "a tiger let go would come back at the village hard", referring himself as the tiger. Since then, Zhang hired a nutritionist, quit smoking and has stayed away from tea during training and in the immediate run-up to boxing matches.

Zhang's fight with Forrest was on the undercard of the super-middleweight title fight between Canelo Álvarez and Avni Yıldırım. Although Zhang started strongly, scoring three knockdowns in the opening three rounds, Zhang completely gassed out from the fourth round and Forrest was able to battle his way back to earn a majority draw. The final scorecards read 95–93 Forrest, 93–93, and 93–93, with the irregular scores owing to a point deduction against Zhang for excessive holding. Many fans thought Zhang vs. Forrest was a better fight than the main bout.

On 27 November 2021, Zhang faced Craig Lewis on the undercard of Teófimo López vs. George Kambosos Jr. Zhang started the fight off slowly, but dropped Lewis twice in round two, leading Lewis' corner to throw in the towel, giving Zhang a win by TKO.

=== Rise up the ranks ===
==== Zhang vs. Hrgović ====
Zhang was scheduled to fight Filip Hrgović in an IBF title eliminator on 7 May 2022. However, Hrgović pulled out of the fight on 2 May, after his father died and his training suffered. Scott Alexander was chosen as the replacement on the Canelo Álvarez vs. Dmitry Bivol undercard, with the fight being dropped from the co-main to the undercard. Zhang won the bout via first-round knockout. His fight against Hrgović was rescheduled for 20 August 2022, in Jeddah, Saudi Arabia, on the undercard of Oleksandr Usyk vs Anthony Joshua II. On that night, Zhang knocked Hrgović down in the first round with a big right. After a close-fought battle over twelve rounds, the judges awarded the fight to Hrgović with two scores of 115–112 and one of 114–113, in what was described as a "generous" decision by broadcaster Sky Sports after a "bizarre" performance by Hrgović.

=== WBO interim heavyweight champion ===
==== Zhang vs. Joyce ====
It was reported on 20 January 2023, Zhang was to challenge Joe Joyce (15–0, 14 KOs) for the interim WBO heavyweight title at on 15 April in London. No details had been finalised at this stage. Joyce won the WBO Interim title in a September 2022 bout against Joseph Parker. On 2 February, Queensberry Promotions announced Joyce would defend his WBO Interim heavyweight title at the Copper Box Arena in London against Zhang on 15 April. The fight would take place on regular BT Sport. Frank Warren explained, whilst they wanted to keep Joyce busy before an inevitable world title fight, he would still take on tough challenges. One of the reasons for fighting Zhang was due to him being southpaw, which would help prepare for a future showdown with Usyk. There was a lot of positive response for the fight and many saw it as a 50-50. Many also believed Zhang should have got the decision against Hrgović. Joyce spoke about his frustration at how Dubois got himself into a mandatory position and a world title fight before him. He also mentioned Hrgović being in a better position than him, but stated it was out of his control and all he could do was continue and win fights.

Prior to the fight taking place, Zhang warned, "Joe Joyce has good punch resistance but he has never felt Chinese power." This was in reference to Joyce seemingly walking through previous opponents punches. Zhang's trainer Shaun George said they were going into the fight to avoid 'old-fashioned boxing politics', and look for a stoppage. For the fight, two American judges, Mike Fitzgerald and Efrain Lebron, and one English judge, Phil Edwards were chosen by the BBBofC. British referee Howard Foster was chosen as the third man in the ring. George also voiced concern about the referee decision, as Foster had often been criticized for stopping fights early. Joyce stepped on the scales at 256 pounds, his lowest in four years. Zhang was a pound heavier than his previous fight, weighing in at 278 pounds.

In a surprise upset, Joyce lost the fight via TKO in round six, marking the first loss of his professional career. The repeated heavy shots from Zhang caused swelling above Joyce's right eye, causing the referee to wave off the fight. The time of stoppage was 1:34 of the round. In round 1, Zhang took a close round. In the next round, the action picked up. Zhang managed to catch Joyce a few times and ended up drawing blood from his nose. Joyce did his best to fight back towards the end of the round. Round 3 and 4 saw more of the same. Joyce did well to earn round 3 for himself. Zhang came out and landed his power shots to Joyce's chin. Joyce's right eye began to close rapidly through round 5. Joyce was still able to land his jab clean. The ring doctor checked Joyce's right eye after the round. The fight continued on and in round 6, Zhang piled on the power shots landing a 5-punch combination to Joyce's head. Referee Howard Foster stopped the action to bring in the doctor, who rightly stopped the fight. At the end of the fight, the right eye of Joyce was completely closed. Joyce said it was difficult fighting a southpaw after a long time and he had trouble trying to avoid Zhang's left hand. Joyce was disappointed with his performance but credited Zhang on his win.

According to Compubox, although Zhang threw 284 few punches than Joyce, he was much more accurate. Joyce landed 85 of 464 punches thrown (18.3%) and Zhang landed 82 of 180 punches thrown (45.6%). Zhang connected with 78 power shots. According to the broadcast team, one judge had Joyce ahead by one round at the time of stoppage. This was called out by fans on social media.

==== Zhang vs. Joyce II ====
A week after the loss, with a rematch clause in place, Joyce advised that he may take another fight in the interim before having a rematch with Zhang. A decision was to be made by team Joyce, dependant on how well the recovery of Joyce's eye injury came along. Joyce stated although the eye was badly bruised, it did not impair his vision and he could still see. Speaking to iFL TV, Zhang said he respected Joyce more after sharing the ring with him. He praised Joyce's toughness and constant pressure in the ring and welcomed a rematch. Had Joyce not activated the immediate rematch clause, Zhang would have options. Part of the deal for the first bout with Zhang winning, would see him promoted under the Queensberry Promotions banner for the foreseeable. Zhang's co-manager Terry Lane confirmed this.

On 12 June 2023, Zhang confirmed he would defend his interim WBO heavyweight title in a rematch against Joyce, after Joyce activated the rematch clause. The rematch was scheduled to take place at the OVO Arena Wembley in London on 2 September on BT Sport in the UK and ESPN+ in the United States. On 29 June, a press release confirmed all the details of the fight, with the card taking place on the newly rebranded TNT Sport, following the joint venture between BT Group and Warner Bros. Discovery EMEA. Joyce said he had learned from his previous mistakes. Zhang said he would approach this fight as if he had never fought Joyce before and make history again. Due to the heavyweight mandatory rotation system, the WBO were yet to call. Current unified champion Oleksandr Usyk was scheduled to defend his titles against Daniel Dubois in August 2023. A win for Joyce meant he would become next in line to challenge the winner.

Joyce previously stated he overlooked Zhang in their first meeting. Trainer Ismail Salas admitted even he overlooked Zhang, but promised the rematch would be different. A week before the fight, Zhang downplayed Joyce's power, saying it was not as he had imagined. Zhang said he enjoyed being in the ring with Joyce, as Joyce did not move his head much and switch his angles, thus making him an easy target. One of the reasons he kept landing his left hand. For the rematch, the three judges were from South Africa, China, and England. Steve Gray was chosen to referee the bout. Despite the mixture of judges, Zhang's trainer Shaun George still did not believe they should leave it to the judges and planned to get a consecutive stoppage win. This was because Zhang was only ahead by one round on two judges scorecards and one judge had Joyce ahead by one round in their first fight. Joyce was a 9–1 favourite going into the first fight. For the rematch, Zhang was the favourite, only slightly. Despite this, George expected the same result as the first fight. At the weigh in, Joyce weighed a career-high 281.2 pounds. He was 25.2 pounds heavier than the previous fight. Zhang also weighed a career-high 287 pounds, 9 pounds heavier than previously. Despite the extra weight, Joyce assured it would not affect his speed.

In front of a stunned crowd, Zhang stopped Joyce in third round, in what was described as a highlight reel right hook knockout. Zhang was more dominant in the rematch than the first fight. By the end of round 2, Joyce had swelling under both his eyes, again caused by hard shots, which Joyce was unable to avoid. The end came in round 3 when Joyce attempted to throw a right hand. Zhang, seeing this coming, landed a sharp right hook of his own, landing clean and dropped Joyce face first onto the canvas. Joyce stayed on the canvas for a few moments before trying to get up. However, the fight was stopped as Joyce got to his feet. The time of the stoppage was at 3:07 of round three. After the fight, Warren said Joyce would need to consider retirement following back-to-back defeats as it would be a hard journey back to mandatory status. Joyce said he would come again and retirement was not an option. He took on the challenges he believes he did not need to take, considering the position he was in. Joyce stated he was open to a possible rematch with Daniel Dubois, who in August, was stopped in his attempt to capture the world titles from Usyk. Zhang landed 39 of his 104 punches thrown (36.5%), 29 of them being power shots. Joyce landed only 16 of his 133 thrown (12%) with 10 of them being jabs.

==== Zhang vs. Parker ====
On 15 January 2024, only weeks after defeating Deontay Wilder, it was announced that Joseph Parker (34–3, 23 KOs) would challenge Zhang for the WBO interim title, with the fight scheduled to occur on 8 March, as the co-main event of the Knockout Chaos event headlined by Anthony Joshua vs. Francis Ngannou, at Riyadh's Kingdom Arena. A formal press conference would later confirm the event. Parker was on a four-fight win streak in 2023, following his stoppage loss to Joyce in September 2022. Speaking of Parker, Zhang didn't believe he would agree to a fight with him so quickly. He called Parker a warrior who doesn't back down from any challenge. Despite Wilder being a favourite, Zhang correctly predicted that Parker would beat Wilder by decision in their meeting. Zhang expected to wear down Parker over the rounds, just as Joyce before him also did. Joyce came forward with constant pressure, which broke Parker mentally down the stretch, causing the stoppage. Zhang predicted he would stop Parker in their fight. A rematch clause was included in the contract for Zhang, meaning had he lost, he would be able to activate an immediate rematch with Parker. This was due to his status with the WBO, being interim champion. There was a 44 pounds weight difference between the two. Zhang weighed 291.6 pounds and Parker came in at 247.6 pounds. Many felt the build up to the fight went below the radar due to the headline.

Parker got knocked down twice, but won the fight by majority decision. One judge had the fight even at 113–113, while the other two judges had it 114–112 and 115–111 to Parker. Zhang knocked Parker down in rounds three and eight, but was out-boxed in most of the other 10 rounds. Zhang looked tired most of the fight, some observers put this down to his weight, coming in heavy, made him slower and not attack as much as he did in both his fights against Joyce. Parker won majority of the second half by being a bit busier than Zhang, who was being patient, but looked like he wanted to land the knockout blow. The first knockdown occurred in round three, when Zhang landed a straight left to Parker's head. He was not able to capitalise on this. The second knockdown in round eight, was a right hook to the top of Parker's head. Following the fight, Parker spoke about the rematch clause, being open to it as he was contractually obliged to, and stated they would do it again. According to CompuBox, Parker landed 79 power shots and Zhang only connected with 40 power shots.

=== Post-title career ===
==== Zhang vs. Wilder ====
Zhang faced former WBC champion Deontay Wilder on 1 June 2024 as part of a 5v5 card that pitted boxers from Queensberry Promotions and Matchroom Boxing against each other, with Zhang representing Queensberry and Wilder representing Matchroom. He secured victory in the fifth round after landing a counter right hook that left Wilder reeling. With Wilder defenseless, Zhang rushed in and delivered the knockout.

On 26 July, despite not taking an immediate rematch with Parker, Zhang confirmed the clause was still active and he fully intended to take the rematch to avenge his loss.

==== Zhang vs. Kabayel ====
Zhang faced undefeated German heavyweight contender Agit Kabayel on February 22, 2025 on the undercard of Artur Beterbiev vs. Dmitry Bivol II in Riyadh, Saudi Arabia. The bout was for the vacant WBC interim heavyweight title. Despite scoring a knockdown in round five, Zhang was unable to withstand Kabayel's relentless body punches, eventually taking a knee in the sixth round after suffering a hard liver shot, where he was counted out. This was the first stoppage defeat of Zhang's career.

Following the loss to Kabayel, Zhang looked at options to regain his position as a top contender in the heavyweight division. Knowing that rising prospect Moses Itauma and veteran boxer Derek Chisora were scheduled to appear on the same card in Manchester in December, he began calling them out. Zhang posted an Instagram video, directly addressing Chisora and stating, "I want to fight you. I want to bang you. Maybe you want to bang me, too." A few days later, he turned his attention to Itauma, where he praised him. He told BoxNation, "Anyone who wants to fight me. I want to see that contract. I will sign it."

== Personal life ==
Zhang speaks the Henan variety of Central Plains Mandarin in most of his post-match interviews and on his social media Douyin and Weibo, which has become a signature characteristic of his, as those born before the mid-1980s are the last generation to speak Central Plains Mandarin fluently. It and other languages of China have been gradually replaced by Beijing Mandarin in the younger generation in Henan and provinces all over China.

Zhang first met Kurt Li (李茂沛), his English translator (2012–) and his co-manager (2021–) when Li was a staff member handling application forms at the Department of Sports in the 2000s. Zhang asked Li for an application form and Li, a Sichuan Mandarin speaker, did not understand him.

Zhang drinks a lot of Longjing tea, especially while training. This came to public awareness on February 27, 2021, after the fight with Jerry Forrest, when he was hospitalized and diagnosed with iron-deficiency anemia, high enzyme levels, low-level renal failure, electrolyte disorder, liver dysfunction and severe dehydration, with his heavy intake of tea being attributed as one of the factors, along with his poor management of nutrition and fitness at hotel during COVID-19 quarantine in Miami. To distract himself from Chinese tea culture, he developed other hobbies, such as constructing cameras, barbecue grills and car washing equipment. He also skeet shoots in New Jersey.

Zhang's wife, Jiang Huanhuan (蒋欢欢), is a retired starting pitcher for the Henan provincial softball team. They met in 1998, started dating in 2000, and married in December 2006. They have a son, born 2010. Zhang rarely visits his wife and son in China due to problems re-entering the United States.

== Professional boxing record ==
31 fights	27 wins	3 losses
By knockout	22	1
By decision	5	2
Draws	1	

No.	Result	Record	Opponent	Type	Round, time	Date	Location	Notes
31	Loss	27–3–1	Agit Kabayel	KO	6 (12), 2:29	Feb 22, 2025	ANB Arena, Riyadh, Saudi Arabia	For vacant WBC interim heavyweight title
30	Win	27–2–1	Deontay Wilder	TKO	5 (12), 1:51	Jun 1, 2024	Kingdom Arena, Riyadh, Saudi Arabia	
29	Loss	26–2–1	Joseph Parker	MD	12	Mar 8, 2024	Kingdom Arena, Riyadh, Saudi Arabia	Lost WBO interim heavyweight title
28	Win	26–1–1	Joe Joyce	KO	3 (12), 3:07	Sep 23, 2023	Wembley Arena, London, England	Retained WBO interim heavyweight title
27	Win	25–1–1	Joe Joyce	TKO	6 (12), 1:23	Apr 15, 2023	Copper Box Arena, London, England	Won WBO interim heavyweight title
26	Loss	24–1–1	Filip Hrgović	UD	12	Aug 20, 2022	King Abdullah Sports City, Jeddah, Saudi Arabia	
25	Win	24–0–1	Scott Alexander	KO	1 (10), 1:51	May 7, 2022	T-Mobile Arena, Paradise, Nevada, U.S.	
24	Win	23–0–1	Craig Lewis	TKO	2 (8), 2:10	Nov 27, 2021	Hulu Theater, New York City, New York, U.S.	
23	Draw	22–0–1	Jerry Forrest	MD	10	Feb 27, 2021	Hard Rock Stadium, Miami Gardens, Florida, U.S.	
22	Win	22–0	Devin Vargas	KO	4 (10), 1:49	Nov 7, 2020	Seminole Hard Rock Hotel & Casino, Hollywood, Florida, U.S.	
21	Win	21–0	Andriy Rudenko	UD	10	Nov 30, 2019	Casino de Salle Medicin, Monte Carlo, Monaco	Retained WBO Oriental heavyweight title
20	Win	20–0	Don Haynesworth	TKO	3 (10), 1:48	Sep 28, 2018	Dayun No. 1 Stadium, Changsha Social Work College, Changsha, China	Retained WBO Oriental heavyweight title
19	Win	19–0	Eugen Buchmueller	KO	1 (10), 1:03	Jul 20, 2018	WinnaVegas Casino Resort, Sloan, Iowa, U.S.	
18	Win	18–0	Byron Polley	TKO	1 (10), 2:30	Sep 23, 2017	Hartman Arena, Park City, Kansas, U.S.	
17	Win	17–0	Nick Guivas	TKO	1 (10), 2:43	Aug 5, 2017	Claridge Hotel & Casino, Atlantic City, New Jersey, U.S.	
16	Win	16–0	Curtis Harper	TKO	1 (8), 2:34	May 26, 2017	Hotel & Club, Boca Raton, Florida, U.S.	
15	Win	15–0	Mark Brown	KO	1 (8), 2:03	Apr 29, 2017	CenterStage@NoDa, Charlotte, North Carolina, U.S.	
14	Win	14–0	Peter Graham	KO	1 (10), 2:58	Jan 21, 2017	Hebei Sports Venue, Shijiazhuang, China	Won vacant WBO Oriental heavyweight title
13	Win	13–0	Galen Brown	TKO	2 (6), 1:50	Dec 10, 2016	Marina Bay SportsPlex, Quincy, Massachusetts, U.S.	
12	Win	12–0	Gogita Gorgiladze	TKO	1 (8), 1:17	Sep 30, 2016	Wenzhou Gymnasium, Wenzhou, China	
11	Win	11–0	Rodney Hernandez	UD	6	Jul 22, 2016	Claridge Hotel & Casino, Atlantic City, New Jersey, U.S.	
10	Win	10–0	Jamal Woods	TKO	2 (6), 0:41	Jun 11, 2016	Marina Bay SportsPlex, Quincy, Massachusetts, U.S.	
9	Win	9–0	John Orr	TKO	1 (6), 2:27	May 13, 2016	D.C. Armory, Washington, D.C., U.S.	
8	Win	8–0	Tyree Ortiz	TKO	3 (4), 2:14	Mar 26, 2016	Oracle Arena, Oakland, California U.S.	
7	Win	7–0	David Koswara	TKO	1 (6), 0:37	Feb 20, 2016	Lanzhou Gymnasium, Lanzhou, China	
6	Win	6–0	Juan Goode	UD	4	Nov 21, 2015	Mandalay Bay Events Center, Paradise, Nevada, U.S.	
5	Win	5–0	Dennis Benson	TKO	6 (6), 0:56	Aug 15, 2015	The Playground, Atlantic City, New Jersey, U.S.	
4	Win	4–0	Glenn Thomas	UD	4	Jun 6, 2015	Barclays Center, Brooklyn, New York, U.S.	
3	Win	3–0	Eric George	UD	4	Mar 14, 2015	Jersey City Armory, Jersey City, New Jersey, U.S.	
2	Win	2–0	Perry Filkins	TKO	1 (4), 1:10	Jan 17, 2015	Mohegan Sun Casino, Uncasville, Connecticut, U.S.	
1	Win	1–0	Curtis Lee Tate	TKO	1 (4), 0:17	Aug 8, 2014	Churchill County Fairgrounds, Fallon, Nevada, U.S.	

== See also ==
- List of southpaw stance boxers

Sporting positions
Regional boxing titles
Vacant Title last held by Joseph Parker	WBO Oriental heavyweight champion 21 January 2017 – 2020; Vacated	Vacant Title next held by Joseph Parker
World boxing titles
Preceded by Joe Joyce	WBO heavyweight champion Interim title 15 April 2023 – 8 March 2024	Succeeded by Joseph Parker
