= Josh Padley =

English boxer (born 1995)

Personal information
- Nickname: Paddy
- Born: 12 November 1995 (age 30) Doncaster, England
- Height: 5 ft 7 in (1.70 m)
- Weight: Lightweight; Light welterweight

Boxing career
- Stance: Orthodox

Boxing record
- Total fights: 20
- Wins: 19
- Win by KO: 6
- Losses: 1

Josh Padley (born 12 November 1995) is an English professional boxer. He challenged once for the WBC lightweight title in 2025 and has held the European super-featherweight title since January 2026.

== Professional career ==
=== Padley vs. Chamberlain ===
Padley had the biggest fight of his career up to this point against undefeated British lightweight Mark Chamberlain at Wembley. The fight, scheduled as a light-welterweight bout, took place on the undercard of Anthony Joshua vs Daniel Dubois on 21 September 2024. Going into fight, Chamberlain was a big favourite and was expecting to face WBO lightweight champion Denys Berinchyk should he be victorious. The early rounds were close, but as the fight went on, Padley began to take over, dropping the Portsmouth man in the 8th round. After the fight, Padley announced he was returning to the lightweight division.

=== Padley vs. Stevenson ===
After Floyd Schofield pulled out due to illness, Padley was given a shot at Shakur Stevenson's WBC lightweight title on 22 February 2025, on the undercard of Artur Beterbiev vs. Dmitry Bivol II. Despite being a huge underdog, Padley put up a spirited performance before eventually being stopped in the ninth round. He was dropped three times, leading to his corner throwing in the towel.

=== Padley vs. Bellotti ===
Padley faced Reece Bellotti at Sheffield Arena on 11 October 2025. He won by unanimous decision.

=== Padley vs. Belmehdi ===
Padley faced Jaouad Belmehdi for the vacant European super-featherweight title at Newcastle Arena on 31 January 2026, winning by stoppage in the second round.

=== Padley vs. Fiaz ===
On 6 June 2026 at Sheffield Arena, he made the first defense of his European title against Aqib Fiaz. His opponent was deducted a point for repeated low blows in the 11th round and Padley went on to win via split decision with the judges' scorecards reading 115–112, 114–113 and 113–114.

== Professional boxing record ==
20 fights	19 wins	1 loss
By knockout	6	1
By decision	13	0

No.	Result	Record	Opponent	Type	Round, time	Date	Location	Notes
20	Win	19–1	Aqib Fiaz	SD	12	6 Jun 2026	Sheffield Arena, Sheffield, England	Retained European super-featherweight title
19	Win	18–1	Jaouad Belmehdi	TKO	2 (12), 2:35	31 Jan 2026	Newcastle Arena, Newcastle upon Tyne, England	Won vacant European super-featherweight title
18	Win	17–1	Reece Bellotti	UD	10	11 Oct 2025	Sheffield Arena, Sheffield, England	
17	Win	16–1	Marko Cvetanovic	TKO	5 (10), 1:13	19 Apr 2025	Canon Medical Arena, Sheffield, England	
16	Loss	15–1	Shakur Stevenson	TKO	9 (12) 3:00	22 Feb 2025	The Venue Riyadh Season, Riyadh, Saudi Arabia	For WBC lightweight title
15	Win	15–0	Mark Chamberlain	UD	10	21 Sep 2024	Wembley Stadium, London, England	
14	Win	14–0	Conner Lee Doherty	TKO	4 (6), 0:54	2 Mar 2024	LUFC Banqueting Suite, Leeds, England	
13	Win	13–0	Lydon Chircop	RTD	6 (10), 3:00	2 Dec 2023	Hotel Intercontinental, St. Julian's, Malta	Won vacant UBO International lightweight title
12	Win	12–0	Clayton Bricknell	TKO	6 (8), 1:11	24 Nov 2023	LUFC Banqueting Suite, Leeds, England	
11	Win	11–0	Victor Julio	PTS	6	16 Jun 2023	Magna Centre, Rotherham, England	
10	Win	10–0	Jimmy First	PTS	10	11 Mar 2023	The Bradford Hotel, Bradford, England	Won Central Area lightweight title
9	Win	9–0	Mark Butler	TKO	6 (8), 3:00	28 Oct 2022	Doncaster Dome, Doncaster, England	
8	Win	8–0	Jordan Ellison	PTS	6	28 May 2022	Platinum Suite, Doncaster, England	
7	Win	7–0	Cristian Narvaez	PTS	6	25 Mar 2022	Doncaster Dome, Doncaster, England	
6	Win	6–0	Brayan Mairena	PTS	6	18 Feb 2022	Bolton Whites Hotel, Bolton, England	
5	Win	5–0	Ezequiel Gregores	PTS	4	20 Nov 2021	Magna Centre, Rotherham, England	
4	Win	4–0	Jordan Ellison	PTS	6	21 Feb 2020	Holiday Inn, Doncaster, England	
3	Win	3–0	Liam Richards	PTS	6	23 Nov 2019	North Notts Arena, Worksop, England	
2	Win	2–0	Naeem Ali	PTS	4	13 Sep 2019	Bolton Whites Hotel, Bolton, England	
1	Win	1–0	Jamie Quinn	PTS	4	13 Apr 2019	North Notts Arena, Worksop, England	
