= Joe Joyce vs Zhilei Zhang =

April 2023 boxing competition

Joe Joyce vs. Zhilei Zhang
- Date: 15 April 2023
- Venue: Copper Box Arena, Hackney Wick, London, UK
- Title(s) on the line: WBO interim heavyweight title

Tale of the tape
Boxer	(United Kingdom) Joe Joyce	(China) Zhilei Zhang
Nickname	"Juggernaut"	"Big Bang"
Hometown	Putney, London, UK	Zhoukou, Henan, China
Pre-fight record	15–0 (14 KOs)	24–1–1 (19 KOs)
Age	37 years, 6 months	39 years, 11 months
Height	6 ft 6 in (198 cm)	6 ft 6 in (198 cm)
Weight	255.7 lb (116 kg)	271.6 lb (123 kg)
Style	Orthodox	Southpaw
Recognition	WBO; Interim Heavyweight Champion; TBRB; No. 2 Ranked Heavyweight; The Ring; No. 4 Ranked Heavyweight	WBO; No. 13 Ranked Heavyweight

Result
- Zhang wins via 6th-round TKO

Joe Joyce vs. Zhilei Zhang was a professional boxing match contested on for the WBO interim heavyweight title.

== Background ==
Joe Joyce won the WBO Interim World Heavyweight title in a September 2022 bout against Joseph Parker. Zhang's last bout before facing Joyce was in August 2022 when he suffered his first loss to Croatian Filip Hrgović, after a close-fought battle where he lost by unanimous decision in what was described as a "generous" decision by broadcaster Sky Sports after a "bizarre" performance by Hrgović.

In December 2022, Joyce told Sky Sports that he planned to stay busy, next scheduling a fight for March 2023. No opponents were announced. There was still ongoing negotiations between Fury and Usyk. Fury previously stated, had talks broken down again, he would fight Joyce in the interim. Joyce also spoke about how he did not want to become inactive and wait for a title shot, like other contenders do. Instead, to stay active and improve himself in the ring. It was reported on 20 January 2023, 39 year old Chinese contender Zhilei was to challenge Joyce for the interim WBO title at on 15 April in London. No details had been finalised at this stage. Zhang was coming off a close decision loss to fellow contender Filip Hrgović, after dropping him in the opening round in August 2022.

When asked, Joyce said he would prefer to fight Fury over Usyk, but was not righting off Usyk. On 2 February, Queensberry Promotions announced Joyce would defend his WBO Interim heavyweight title at the Copper Box Arena in London against Zhang on 15 April. The fight would take place on regular BT Sport. Frank Warren explained, whilst they wanted to keep Joyce busy before an inevitable world title fight, he would still take on tough challenges. One of the reasons for fighting Zhang was due to him being southpaw, which would help prepare for a future showdown with Usyk. There was a lot of positive response for the fight and many saw it as a 50-50. Many also believed Zhang should have got the decision against Hrgović. Joyce spoke about his frustration at how Dubois got himself into a mandatory position and a world title fight before him. He also mentioned Hrgović being in a better position than him, but stated it was out of his control and all he could do was continue and win fights.

Prior to the fight taking place, Zhang warned, “Joe Joyce has good punch resistance but he has never felt Chinese power.” This was in reference to Joyce seemingly walking through previous opponents punches. Zhang's trainer Shaun George said they were going into the fight to avoid 'old-fashioned boxing politics', and look for a stoppage. For the fight, two American judges, Mike Fitzgerald and Efrain Lebron, and one English judge, Phil Edwards were chosen by the BBBofC. British referee Howard Foster was chosen as the third man in the ring. George also voiced concern about the referee decision, as Foster had often been criticized for stopping fights early. Joyce stepped on the scales at 256 pounds, his lowest in four years. Zhang was a pound heavier than his previous fight, weighing in at 278 pounds.

== The fight ==
In a surprise upset, Joyce lost the fight via TKO in round six, marking the first loss of his professional career. The repeated heavy shots from Zhang caused swelling above Joyce's right eye, causing the referee to wave off the fight. The time of stoppage was 1:34 of the round. In round 1, Zhang took a close round. In the next round, the action picked up. Zhang managed to catch Joyce a few times and ended up drawing blood from his nose. Joyce did his best to fight back towards the end of the round. Round 3 and 4 saw more of the same. Joyce did well to earn round 3 for himself. Zhang came out and landed his power shots to Joyce's chin. Joyce’s right eye began to close rapidly through round 5. Joyce was still able to land his jab clean. The ring doctor checked Joyce's right eye after the round. The fight continued on and in round 6, Zhang piled on the power shots landing a 5-punch combination to Joyce's head. Referee Howard Foster stopped the action to bring in the doctor, who rightly stopped the fight. At the end of the fight, the right eye of Joyce was completely closed. Joyce said it was difficult fighting a southpaw after a long time and he had trouble trying to avoid Zhang's left hand. Joyce was disappointed with his performance but credited Zhang on his win.

=== Compubox ===
According to Compubox, although Zhang threw 284 few punches than Joyce, he was much more accurate. Joyce landed 85 of 464 punches thrown (18.3%) and Zhang landed 82 of 180 punches thrown (45.6%). Zhang connected with 78 power shots. According to the broadcast team, one judge had Joyce ahead by one round at the time of stoppage. This was called out by fans on social media.

== Aftermath ==
Following Zhang's victory, reports stated that a bout between himself and Tyson Fury were being discussed. On 29 June an immediate rematch was announced for 23 September at Wembley Arena in London, England for the same title. Tyson Fury took to social media to offer Joyce sparring following the announcement.

== Fight card ==
Weight Class		vs.		Method	Round	Time	Notes
Heavyweight	Zhilei Zhang	def.	Joe Joyce (c)	TKO	6/12	1:23	^{Note 1}
Lightweight	Mikaela Mayer	def.	Lucy Wildheart	UD	10		^{Note 2}
Heavyweight	Moses Itauma	def.	Kostiantyn Dovbyshchenko	UD	6
Lightweight	Sam Noakes (c)	def.	Karthik Sathish	TKO	2/12	1:17	^{Note 3}
Middleweight	Denzel Bentley	def.	Kieran Smith	KO	1/12	0:45	^{Note 4}
Welterweight	Eithan James	def.	Georgi Velichkov	PTS	6
Preliminary bouts
Super-lightweight	Sonny Ali	def.	Richard Helm	PTS	6
Light-heavyweight	Seth Gyimah	def.	Darryl Sharp	PTS	4
Middleweight	Joel Kodua	def.	Dale Arrowsmith	PTS	4

^Note 1 For WBO interim heavyweight title
^Note 2 For vacant WBC interim lightweight title
^Note 3 For Commonwealth Boxing Council and WBC International Silver lightweight titles
^Note 4 For British middleweight title

== Broadcasting ==
Country	Broadcaster
United Kingdom	BT Sport
United States	ESPN+

Preceded by vs. Joseph Parker	Joe Joyce' bouts 15 April 2023	Succeeded by Rematch
Preceded by vs. Filip Hrgović	Zhilei Zhang's bouts 15 April 2023	Succeeded by Rematch
