= Boxing at the 2010 Asian Games – Men's +91 kg =

Boxing competitions

Men's +91 kg at the 2010 Asian Games
- Venue: Lingnan Mingzhu Gymnasium
- Date: 16–25 November 2010
- Competitors: 9 from 9 nations

Medalists
gold medal	Zhang Zhilei	China
silver medal	Ivan Dychko	Kazakhstan
bronze medal	Rouhollah Hosseini	Iran
bronze medal	Paramjeet Samota	India

The men's super heavyweight (+91 kilograms) event at the 2010 Asian Games took place from 16 to 25 November 2010 at Lingnan Mingzhu Gymnasium, Foshan, China.

Like all Asian Games boxing events, the competition was a straight single-elimination tournament. All bouts consisted of three three-minute rounds. The boxers receive points for every successful punch they land on their opponent's head or upper body. The boxer with the most points at the end of the bouts wins.

A total of 9 men from 9 countries competed in this event, limited to fighters whose body weight was over 91 kilograms. Zhang Zhilei of China won the gold medal. He beat Ivan Dychko of Kazakhstan 7–5 in the final bout in Foshan Gymnasium. Rouhollah Hosseini and Paramjeet Samota shared the bronze medal.

== Schedule ==
All times are China Standard Time (UTC+08:00)

Date	Time	Event
Tuesday, 16 November 2010	14:00	Round of 16
Thursday, 18 November 2010	14:00	Quarterfinals
Wednesday, 24 November 2010	14:00	Semifinals
Thursday, 25 November 2010	19:00	Final

== Results ==
Legend

- RSC — Won by referee stop contest

Round of 16
Zhang Zhilei (CHN)	RSC
Davaalkhagvagiin Iderbat (MGL)

Quarterfinals
Mir Wais Khan (PAK)	0
Rouhollah Hosseini (IRI)	4
Sardor Abdullaev (UZB)	1
Ivan Dychko (KAZ)	8
Paramjeet Samota (IND)	RSC
Park Sung-keun (KOR)
Soumar Ghossoun (SYR)	3
Zhang Zhilei (CHN)	5

Semifinals
Rouhollah Hosseini (IRI)	4
Ivan Dychko (KAZ)	6
Paramjeet Samota (IND)
Zhang Zhilei (CHN)	RSC

Final
Ivan Dychko (KAZ)	5
Zhang Zhilei (CHN)	7
