= Pierce O'Leary (boxer) =

Irish boxer (born 2000)

Personal information
- Nickname: Big Bang
- Nationality: Irish
- Born: 28 February 2000 (age 26)
- Height: 5 ft 8 in (173 cm)
- Weight: Super-lightweight

Boxing career
- Stance: Orthodox

Boxing record
- Total fights: 20
- Wins: 19
- Win by KO: 11
- Losses: 1

Pierce O'Leary (born 28 February 2000) is an Irish professional boxer He held the IBO super-lightweight title in 2026. O'Leary is also a former European champion in the same weight division.

== Career ==
A nine-time Irish amateur champion, O'Leary turned professional in 2019, signing a promotional contract with MTK Global. He made his pro-debut on 11 October that year, defeating Oscar Amador on points over four rounds at Ulster Hall in Belfast.

Unbeaten in his first 10 professional fights and now signed to Frank Warren's Queensbury Promotions, O'Leary claimed the vacant WBC International super-lightweight title thanks to a unanimous decision win over Emmanuel Mungandjela at the O2 Arena in London on 26 November 2022.

He made the first defense of his championship at the SSE Arena in Belfast on 27 May 2023, stopping Alin Florin Ciorceri in the first round.

On 23 September 2023, he retained his title with a unanimous decision victory over Kane Gardner at Wembley Arena in London.

Two more successful defenses followed as O'Leary stopped Hovhannes Martirosyan in the ninth round at Resorts World Arena in Birmingham on 16 March 2024, and then prevailed via unanimous decision against Darragh Foley back at the SSE Arena in Belfast on 28 June 2024.

In his next outing, he stopped Jose Edgardo Perdomo in the third of their scheduled eight-round non-title contest at Wembley Arena in London on 7 December 2024.

O'Leary defended his championship for the fifth time against Liam Dillon at Portman Road in Ipswich on 7 June 2025, with the vacant European super-lightweight title also on the line. He won via unanimous decision.

He was scheduled to face Mark Chamberlain for the vacant IBO super-lightweight title at 3Arena in Dublin on 14 March 2026. However, Chamberlain withdrew two weeks before the fight was due to take place due to illness and was replaced by Maxi Hughes. O'Leary won when Hughes retired on his stool at the end of the fifth round. The fight between O'Leary and Chamberlain was then rescheduled to take place at 3Arena in Dublin on 1 August 2026. O'Leary was sent to the canvas in the second and third rounds before scoring a knock down of his own in the seventh. He was floored again in the 10th round with the referee stepping in to stop the contest and award Chamberlain the win via technical knockout.

== Professional boxing record ==
20 fights	19 wins	1 loss
By knockout	11	1
By decision	8	0

No.	Result	Record	Opponent	Type	Round, time	Date	Location	Notes
20	Loss	19–1	Mark Chamberlain	TKO	10 (12), 1:37	1 Aug 2026	3Arena, Dublin, Ireland	Lost IBO super-lightweight title
19	Win	19–0	Maxi Hughes	RTD	5 (12), 3:00	14 Mar 2026	3Arena, Dublin, Ireland	Won vacant IBO super-lightweight title
18	Win	18–0	Braian Esequiel Ronner	KO	8 (8), 0:53	6 Dec 2025	Rushcliffe Arena, Nottingham, Nottinghamshire, England	
17	Win	17–0	Liam Dillon	UD	12	7 Jun 2025	Portman Road, Ipswich, Suffolk, England	Won vacant European super-lightweight title
16	Win	16–0	Jose Edgardo Perdomo	TKO	3 (8), 1:06	7 Dec 2024	Wembley Arena, London, England	
15	Win	15–0	Darragh Foley	UD	10	28 Jun 2024	SSE Arena, Belfast, Northern Ireland	Retained WBC International super-lightweight title
14	Win	14–0	Hovhannes Martirosyan	KO	9 (10), 2:39	16 Mar 2024	bp pulse LIVE, Birmingham, West Midlands, England	Retained WBC International super-lightweight title
13	Win	13–0	Kane Gardner	UD	10	23 Sep 2023	Wembley Arena, London, England	Retained WBC International super-lightweight title
12	Win	12–0	Alin Florin Ciorceri	TKO	1 (10), 2:39	27 May 2023	SSE Arena, Belfast, Northern Ireland	Retained WBC International super-lightweight title
11	Win	11–0	Emmanuel Mungandjela	UD	10	26 Nov 2022	The O2 Arena, London, England	Won vacant WBC International super-lightweight title
10	Win	10–0	Robin Zamora	TKO	2 (8), 1:01	16 Jul 2022	Copper Box Arena, London, England	
9	Win	9–0	Nathan Augustine	KO	1 (8), 2:41	15 Apr 2022	York Hall, Bethnal Green, London, England	
8	Win	8–0	Siar Ozgul	TKO	7 (8), 1:14	29 Oct 2021	York Hall, Bethnal Green, London, England	
7	Win	7–0	Jan Marsalek	TKO	2 (4), 2:30	25 Jun 2021	Bolton Whites Hotel (De Vere Whites), Bolton, Lancashire, England	
6	Win	6–0	Irvin Magno	PTS	6	19 Feb 2021	Bolton Whites Hotel (De Vere Whites), Bolton, Lancashire, England	
5	Win	5–0	Jacob Quinn	TKO	4 (6), 0:21	12 Aug 2020	Production Park Studios, South Kirkby, Yorkshire, England	
4	Win	4–0	Liam Richards	PTS	4	1 Feb 2020	Ulster Hall, Belfast, Northern Ireland	
3	Win	3–0	Alec Bazza	TKO	2 (4), 1:56	20 Dec 2019	Bolton Whites Hotel (De Vere Whites), Bolton, Lancashire, England	
2	Win	2–0	Chris Adaway	PTS	4	16 Nov 2019	Emirates Arena, Glasgow, Scotland	
1	Win	1–0	Oscar Amador	PTS	4	11 Oct 2019	Ulster Hall, Belfast, Northern Ireland	
