= Mark Chamberlain (boxer) =

English boxer (born 1999)

Personal information
- Nickname: Thunder
- Born: 11 January 1999 (age 27) Portsmouth, Hampshire, England
- Weight: Lightweight; Super-lightweight

Boxing career
- Stance: Southpaw

Boxing record
- Total fights: 20
- Wins: 18
- Win by KO: 13
- Losses: 1
- Draws: 1

Mark Chamberlain (born 11 January 1999) is an English professional boxer. He has held the IBO super-lightweight title since August 2026.

== Career ==
Having won the English National Amateur Elite Lightweight Championship in April 2018, Chamberlain made his pro-debut on 15 December that year, stopping Aleksandrs Birkenbergs just 39 seconds into the first of their scheduled four-round contest at the Brentwood Centre in Essex.

He won his first professional title by claiming the vacant IBF European lightweight crown with a unanimous decision success over Marc Vidal at Wembley Arena in London on 2 July 2022.

Chamberlain successfully defended his title three times at London's York Hall in 2023, recording stoppage wins against Vairo Lenti on 17 February, Marvin Demollari on 9 June and Artjoms Ramlavs on 24 November.

On 8 March 2024, he faced Gavin Gwynne for the vacant WBA Intercontinental lightweight title at Kingdom Arena in Riyadh, Saudi Arabia, on the undercard of the Anthony Joshua vs Francis Ngannou fight. Chamberlain won by fourth round stoppage.

At the same venue on 18 May 2024, as part of the supporting bill for the Tyson Fury vs Oleksandr Usyk undisputed heavyweight world championship bout, he captured the vacant WBC Silver lightweight title thanks to a first round stoppage of Joshua Wahab.

Chamberlain suffered his first professional defeat on 21 September 2024, when he lost via unanimous decision to Josh Padley at Wembley Stadium on the undercard of the Anthony Joshua vs Daniel Dubois IBF heavyweight world title fight.

He returned to action on 5 April 2025, defeating Miguel Angel Scaringi on points on the undercard of the Joe Joyce vs Filip Hrgovic fight at Co-op Live Arena in Manchester.

Chamberlain challenged British and Commonwealth super-lightweight champion Jack Rafferty at Planet Ice in Altrincham on 23 August 2025. The fight ended in a majority draw with one of the ringside judges scoring it 115–114 in his favour, while the other two had it a 114–114 tie.

He was scheduled to face Pierce O'Leary for the vacant IBO super-lightweight title at 3Arena in Dublin, Ireland, on 14 March 2026. However, Chamberlain withdrew two weeks before the fight was due to take place due to illness. With O'Leary now the IBO champion, the fight was rescheduled for the same venue on 1 August 2026. Chamberlain sent his opponent to the canvas in the second and third rounds before being knocked down himself in the seventh. He floored O'Leary again in the 10th round with the referee stepping in to stop the contest and award him the win, and the title, via technical knockout.

== Personal life ==
Chamberlain worked as a plasterer before becoming a full-time professional boxer.

== Professional boxing record ==
| 20 fights | 18 wins | 1 loss |
|---|---|---|
| By knockout | 13 | 0 |
| By decision | 5 | 1 |
| Draws | 1 | |

| No. | Result | Record | Opponent | Type | Round, time | Date | Location | Notes |
|---|---|---|---|---|---|---|---|---|
| 20 | Win | 18–1–1 | Pierce O'Leary | TKO | 10 (12), 1:37 | 1 Aug 2026 | 3Arena, Dublin, Ireland | Won IBO super-lightweight title |
| 19 | Draw | 17–1–1 | Jack Rafferty | MD | 12 | 23 Aug 2025 | Planet Ice, Altrincham, England | For British and Commonwealth super-lightweight titles |
| 18 | Win | 17–1 | Miguel Angel Scaringi | PTS | 8 | 5 Apr 2025 | Co-op Live, Manchester, England | |
| 17 | Loss | 16–1 | Josh Padley | UD | 10 | 21 Sep 2024 | Wembley Stadium, London, England | |
| 16 | Win | 16–0 | Joshua Oluwaseun Wahab | TKO | 1 (12), 2:42 | 18 May 2024 | Kingdom Arena, Riyadh, Saudi Arabia | Won vacant WBC Silver lightweight title |
| 15 | Win | 15–0 | Gavin Gwynne | TKO | 4 (10), 2:46 | 8 Mar 2024 | Kingdom Arena, Riyadh, Saudi Arabia | Won vacant WBA International lightweight title |
| 14 | Win | 14–0 | Artjoms Ramlavs | TKO | 10 (10), 1:21 | 24 Nov 2023 | York Hall, Bethnal Green, London, England | Retained IBF European lightweight title |
| 13 | Win | 13–0 | Marvin Demollari | TKO | 1 (10), 2:16 | 9 Jun 2023 | York Hall, Bethnal Green, London, England | Retained IBF European lightweight title |
| 12 | Win | 12–0 | Vairo Lenti | KO | 5 (10), 0:53 | 17 Feb 2023 | York Hall, Bethnal Green, London, England | Retained IBF European lightweight title |
| 11 | Win | 11–0 | Marc Vidal | UD | 10 | 2 July 2022 | Wembley Arena, London, England | Won vacant IBF European lightweight title |
| 10 | Win | 10–0 | Jeff Ofori | RTD | 5 (10), 3:00 | 19 Mar 2022 | Wembley Arena, London, England | |
| 9 | Win | 9–0 | Benjamin Lamptey | RTD | 4 (8), 3:00 | 10 Sep 2021 | Copper Box Arena, London, England | |
| 8 | Win | 8–0 | Jordan Ellison | KO | 1 (8), 1:23 | 27 Mar 2021 | Copper Box Arena, London, England | |
| 7 | Win | 7–0 | Shaun Cooper | PTS | 8 | 10 Oct 2020 | BT Sport Studio, London, England | |
| 6 | Win | 6–0 | Stu Greener | TKO | 1 (6), 0:55 | 10 Jul 2020 | BT Sport Studio, London, England | |
| 5 | Win | 5–0 | Josue Bendana | PTS | 4 | 14 Dec 2019 | York Hall, Bethnal Green, London, England | |
| 4 | Win | 4–0 | Lee Connelly | TKO | 1 (4), 1:38 | 14 Sep 2019 | York Hall, Bethnal Green, London, England | |
| 3 | Win | 3–0 | Sergio Gonzalez | PTS | 4 | 13 Jul 2019 | The O2 Arena, London, England | |
| 2 | Win | 2–0 | Laszlo Szoke | TKO | 1 (4), 0:57 | 23 Mar 2019 | Leicester Arena, Leicester, England | |
| 1 | Win | 1–0 | Aleksandrs Birkenbergs | TKO | 1 (4), 0:39 | 15 Dec 2018 | Brentwood Centre, Essex, England | |
