= Anthony Joshua vs Daniel Dubois =

Boxing match

Riyadh Season Card Wembley Edition
- Date: 21 September 2024
- Venue: Wembley Stadium, London, England
- Title(s) on the line: IBF heavyweight title

Tale of the tape
Boxer	Daniel Dubois	Anthony Joshua
Nickname	Dynamite	AJ
Hometown	Greenwich, London, England	Watford, Hertfordshire, England
Pre-fight record	21–2 (20 KO)	28–3 (25 KO)
Age	27 years	34 years, 11 months
Height	6 ft 5 in (196 cm)	6 ft 6 in (198 cm)
Weight	248.6 lb (113 kg)	252 1/2 lb (115 kg)
Style	Orthodox	Orthodox
Recognition	IBF; Heavyweight Champion; TBRB; No. 5 Ranked Heavyweight; The Ring; No. 6 Ranked Heavyweight	IBF/WBO; No. 1 Ranked Heavyweight; The Ring/TBRB; No. 2 Ranked Heavyweight; Former two-time unified heavyweight champion

Result
- Dubois wins by knockout in round 5

Anthony Joshua vs Daniel Dubois, billed as Riyadh Season Card Wembley Edition, was a heavyweight professional boxing match contested between International Boxing Federation (IBF) heavyweight champion Daniel Dubois and two-time former unified heavyweight champion Anthony Joshua.

The bout took place on 21 September 2024 at Wembley Stadium in London, England. Dubois defeated Joshua via knockout in the 5th round.

== Background ==
On 26 June 2024 Dubois was elevated to full IBF champion after Oleksandr Usyk vacated the belt. It was announced that he would be making his first defence of the title against former two-time unified champion Anthony Joshua at Wembley Stadium in London on 21 September. Both fighters were coming off two comeback victories after losing to unified champion Oleksandr Usyk, and the winner was expected to fight the winner of Usyk's rematch with Tyson Fury.

== Fight details ==
Dubois retained his title by defeating Joshua by KO in the fifth round after a dominant performance. The result was considered a major upset, as Dubois was the pre-betting underdog going into fight. Dubois immediately started aggressively, and knocked Joshua to the canvas at the end of the first round with a huge overhand right to Joshua's chin. Joshua was able to beat the count, but seemed to be on unsteady legs as the bell signalled the end of the first round. During the second and third rounds, Dubois sustained continuous pressure and regularly hit Joshua with clean power punches, before knocking Joshua down again at the end of the third round with a barrage of punches. The fourth round saw Joshua hit the canvas twice more, although one of those occasions was ruled a slip. After being instructed to 'roll the dice' by his corner in between rounds, Joshua started the fifth round more positively. He landed a hard right hand which forced Dubois to retreat into the corner, and Joshua attempted to land multiple follow-up punches. However, Dubois countered Joshua's attempted right uppercut with a short right hand which sent Joshua to the canvas once more. The fight was called off after 59 seconds of the fifth round, with Dubois retaining his IBF heavyweight title via fifth-round knockout. Over the five rounds, Dubois landed 79 of his 196 punches thrown with a connect rate of 40% and Joshua landed only 32 of his 117 punches thrown with a connect rate of 27%.

== Fight card ==
Weight Class		vs.		Method	Round	Time	Scorecards	Notes
Main Card
Heavyweight	Daniel Dubois (c)	def.	Anthony Joshua	KO	5 (12)	0:59
Middleweight	Hamzah Sheeraz	def.	Tyler Denny	KO	2 (12)	2:05
Light Heavyweight	Joshua Buatsi	def.	Willy Hutchinson	SD	12 (12)		(112–113, 117–108, 115–110)
Super Featherweight	Anthony Cacace	def.	Josh Warrington	UD	12 (12)		(118–110, 117–111, 117–111)
Light Middleweight	Josh Kelly	def.	Ishmael Davis	MD	12 (12)		(114–114, 115–113, 115–114)
Lightweight	Josh Padley	def.	Mark Chamberlain	UD	10 (10)		(95–93, 96–92, 96–92)

Preceded by vs. Filip Hrgović	Daniel Dubois' bouts 21 September 2024	Succeeded by vs. Joseph Parker
Preceded by vs. Francis Ngannou	Anthony Joshua's bouts 21 September 2024	Succeeded by TBA
Awards
Previous: Junto Nakatani vs. Cristofer Rosales	The Ring Knockout of the Year; 2024	Incumbent
