= Daniel Dubois =

British boxer (born 1997)

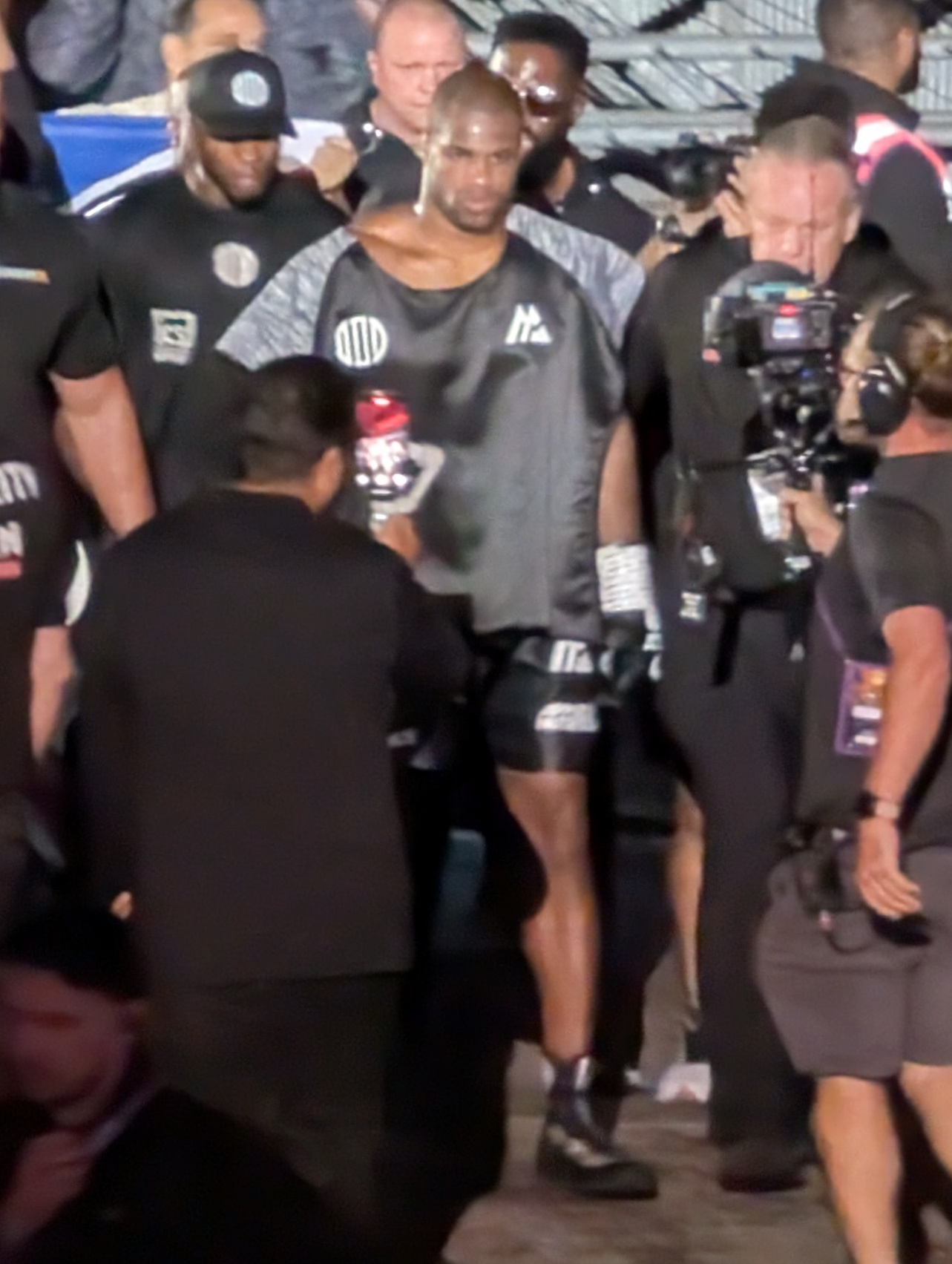
- Dubois at Wembley Stadium in 2025

Personal information
- Nicknames: Dynamite; Dynamite Daniel Dubois; DDD ("Triple D")
- Born: 6 September 1997 (age 29) Greenwich, London, England
- Height: 6 ft 5 in (196 cm)
- Weight: Heavyweight

Boxing career
- Reach: 78 in (198 cm)
- Stance: Orthodox

Boxing record
- Total fights: 27
- Wins: 24
- Win by KO: 23
- Losses: 3

Daniel Dubois (born 6 September 1997) is a British professional boxer. He is a two-time heavyweight world champion, having held the World Boxing Organization (WBO) title since May 2026, and previously the International Boxing Federation (IBF) title from 2024 to 2025. He also previously held the World Boxing Association (WBA) heavyweight title (Regular version) from 2022 to 2023. At regional level, he has held multiple heavyweight championships, including the British and Commonwealth titles from 2019 to 2020.

== Amateur career ==
His father took him to the boxing gym at the age of nine to stay out of trouble in South London. He trains at the Peacock Gym in Canning Town, working under Tony and Martin Bowers. Dubois had around 75 amateur bouts. He won two English schoolboy titles, two junior ABAs plus the CYPs. Dubois spent 18 months in the GB Elite system in Sheffield, boxing for England around a dozen times, competing at the European Youth championships twice and winning gold medals at international events in Tammer (Finland) and Brandenburg (Germany). He was on the Great Britain Olympic team aiming to compete at the 2020 Tokyo Olympics, though Dubois opted to turn professional instead, rendering him unable to compete in the Olympics. He signed with boxing promoter Frank Warren.

== Professional career ==
=== Early career ===
Dubois' first fight as a professional was a knockout win in the first 35 seconds of the first round against Marcus Kelly in April 2017. In his fourth fight, he knocked out Mauricio Barragan, a late substitute, in the second round to win the vacant WBC Youth heavyweight title. In October 2017, he knocked out AJ Carter in the first round to claim the Southern Area heavyweight title. He won the English heavyweight title in his eighth fight in June 2018, beating Tom Little by stoppage in the fifth round. He won the WBO European title in March 2019, beating former WBO heavyweight title challenger, Răzvan Cojanu, in two rounds. Dubois was taken the full distance for the first time by former world title challenger Kevin Johnson in October 2018, winning on points after ten rounds, and beat Richard Lartey in the fourth round in April 2019.

In July 2019, he beat Nathan Gorman by knockout in the fifth round to improve his record to 12 wins, 11 by stoppage, and win the vacant British heavyweight title. Boxing journalist Steve Bunce said he "...fought like an old, seasoned bruiser, his feet flawless, his jab a stiff weapon inherited from relics of the ring". BBC boxing correspondent Mike Costello described him as "...one of the brightest prospects in the sport at the moment."

In his next fight, Dubois faced Ebenezer Tetteh. Dubois blasted Tetteh out in the first round, dropping him twice in the process.

After that, Dubois faced Japanese heavyweight Kyotaro Fujimoto. Fujimoto was overmatched from the beginning, fighting to survive from the opening bell. In the second round, Dubois connected on a right hand that knocked out Fujimoto.

On 29 August 2020, Dubois had another dominant win, this time against Ricardo Snijders. Dubois managed to drop his opponent three times in the first round. The first round would end up being the last that Snijders would survive, as the referee waved the fight off after Dubois dropped his opponent for the fourth time.

=== Rise up the ranks ===
==== Dubois vs. Joyce ====
On 7 February 2020, a press release came out to officially announce Dubois vs. Joe Joyce (11–0, 10 KOs). The fight was scheduled to take place on 11 April at The O2 Arena in London, live on BT Sport Box Office. Dubois would be defending his British, Commonwealth, WBC Silver and WBO International titles and Joyce would be defending his WBA Gold title. The fight was billed as "Seek & Destroy". The fight was promoted by Frank Warren's Queensberry Promotions. Dubois said the fight would be his 'most devastating performance' of his career. Days after the fight was announced, Joyce split with trainer Adam Booth. He had reportedly signed with his former trainer Ismael Salas and headed to Las Vegas to train at the UFC Training Center. The split with Booth was amicable, according to Joyce and his manager Sam Jones. Salas became Joyce's fourth trainer in only his eleventh professional fight. Salas stated Joyce would be in top shape for the fight. Although his previous coaches did a good job, they never understood his body. He also stated Joyce would be Dubois' biggest test, someone he has been following since his debut. On 20 February, it was confirmed the vacant European heavyweight title would be at stake.

On 12 March, Frank Warren stated the fight was still scheduled to take place despite the coronavirus concerns and everything would be closely monitored. On 26 March, the BBBofC had cancelled all UK boxing events and lockdown in the UK was also confirmed. The fight was pushed back to 11 July 2020. Frank Warren did not want the fight to take place behind closed doors. By May 2020, the July fight date was also looking unlikely, due to the British Board's request to have any events without an attendance. Joyce was open to having an interim bout in between. On 25 June, the fight was again rescheduled. This time to take place on 24 October at The O2 Arena. Warren hoped by then, the BBBofC would allow limited crowd to attend the event. Joyce had an interim bout against Michael Wallisch, on 25 July, who he defeated via 3rd round TKO. On 29 August, Dubois stopped late replacement Ricardo Snijders in round 2. Dubois was originally scheduled to fight unbeaten two-time Olympic Erik Pfeifer.

There was speculation the fight would likely be pushed back further another month. Both boxers said they would take the fight without any fans. On 6 October, Warren announced the fight would take place on BT Sports, without pay-per-view, which was considered a huge reversal, on 28 November at Church House in London. The fight billing changed to "At Last" after being rescheduled three times. Prior to the fight, the bookmakers had Joyce the underdog heading in. Joyce felt insulted and overlooked. Majority bookmakers also had the fight expected to not go the distance. Joyce stated this boosted his confidence going into the fight and vowed, "people who bet on me will have a nicer Christmas." Joyce was also criticized on is physique when he fought Wallisch. The fight was looked at a genuine 50–50, with many boxing pundits and boxers unable to separate the two. Only two days before the fight, Joyce team hit a setback as trainer Salas tested positive for Covid upon arriving at the hotel in London. The fight was still scheduled to go ahead with Steve Broughton brought in Joyce's corner alongside Jimmy Tibbs. Dubois weighed 244.4 pounds. Joyce came in heavier at 258.9 pounds.

In a closely contested fight that had implications for future world title hopes, Dubois was landing the harder and cleaner punches while Joyce stayed at range behind powerful jabs. The repeated accurate jabs from Joyce caused swelling to the left eye of Dubois from the second round. In the tenth, after another hard jab landed on his now-swollen-shut eye, Dubois went down on one knee, allowing the referee to count him out to suffer the first loss of his career. At the time of stoppage, only one judge had Joyce ahead 87–84 and the other two judges had Dubois ahead 86–85 and a controversial 88–83, only giving Joyce two rounds. According to the CompuBox Stats, Dubois landed 146 of his 486 punches thrown, at 30% connect rate. 82 landed were power shots. Joyce was less accurate, landing 125 of his 544 thrown, at 23% connect. Joyce landed 98 jabs which was 79.6% of his total output. Dubois was hit with claims that he quit from fellow boxers and pundits, however was also backed by some, saying it was the right decision and potentially saved his career. Following the fight it was revealed that Dubois had suffered a broken left orbital bone and nerve damage around the eye and would be out of action for around six months.

==== Dubois vs. Dinu ====
After a layoff of over six months, on 16 April 2021 it was announced that Dubois would return to the ring on 5 June to face Bogdan Dinu (20–2, 16 KOs) at the Telford International Centre in Telford. Dinu had only lost two fights - to Jarrell Miller and Kubrat Pulev - and held a record of 20 wins. The fight was for the vacant WBA interim heavyweight title. Dubois said he would approach the fight as if he was starting his professional career again. Following his first professional defeat, Dubois split with trainer Martin Bowers and hired Mark Tibbs in February 2021. In May, Dubois split with Tibbs and hired Shane McGuigan. According to reports, it was Tibbs, who had told team Dubois that he had other commitments, which caused the split. To prepare for Dubois, Dinu trained in Buzau, Romania with Jarrell Miller. Dubois weighed 240.3 pounds, slightly lighter than his loss to Joyce. Dinu weighed 250.4 pounds.

Dubois won the bout by second-round knockout, winning the vacant WBA interim heavyweight title in the process. The win also made him the mandatory challenger for the WBA (Regular) title held by undefeated Trevor Bryan. It was Dubois' right hand which connected Dinu's jaw that dropped him to the canvas. Dinu was unable to continue and the fight was stopped after 31 seconds.

==== Dubois vs. Cusumano ====
On 31 July 2021, it was reported that Dubois would make his US debut. He along with Tommy Fury would appear on the undercard of Jake Paul vs. Tyron Woodley on 29 August at Rocket Mortgage FieldHouse in Cleveland, Ohio. Fury appeared on the card to help promote a future fight with Jake Paul. It would mark the first time Dubois would fight outside of the UK. He faced Joe Cusumano (19–3, 17 KOs), and prevailed via first-round technical knockout victory. Dubois took some punishment, but fought through this to score three knockdowns. In his post-fight interview, he expressed interest in challenging Trevor Bryan for his WBA (Regular) title. Frank Warren considered it a successful debut in the United States.

=== WBA (Regular) heavyweight champion ===
==== Dubois vs. Bryan ====
Discussions first began for Dubois to challenge WBA (Regular) champion Trevor Bryan in August 2021 prior to Dubois making his US debut. Frank Warren stated negotiations would hopefully begin shortly after. In the meantime, previous WBA (Regular) belt holder Mahmoud Charr filed a lawsuit against Bryan's promoter Don King. King later won a purse bid for a Bryan-Charr fight. Whilst waiting for a contract from King, Charr threatened to sue and boycott the WBA. In January 2022, Charr was removed as champion-in-recess and not able to travel to the USA due to VISA issues. Bryan went on to beat replacement Jonathan Guidry via split decision.

Following the win, on 1 February, the WBA ordered Bryan (22–0, 15 KOs) to defend the belt against Dubois, with possible purse bids to take place on 14 March and the fight to take place before 28 July 2022. Purse bids were postponed to 21 March. Don King Productions won the purse bids with an offer of $3,116,001, beating Queensberry Promotions bid of $2,503,000. A per splits, Bryan was entitled to take home a purse of $1,713,800.55 (55%) and the remaining 45%, which equated to $1,402,200.45 was for Dubois. King proposed the fight would land in either London, New York or South Florida. On 5 May, the fight was announced to take place at the Casino Miami Jai-Alai in Miami on 11 June on PPV. It was billed as "The Fight for Freedom and Peace". Bryan was receiving support during his training camp from Larry Holmes. The fight was picked up by BT Sport in the UK, who would also broadcast a card in the UK as a split-site telecast, headlined by Liam Davies challenging Marc Leach for the British super bantamweight title.

There was less than a thousand spectators in attendance. Dubois defeated Bryan by knockout in the fourth round to become the WBA (Regular) heavyweight champion. There was little action in the opening two rounds. Dubois caught Bryan with a right hand towards the end of round 3 which hurt him. In round 4, it was a left-right combination from Dubois that dropped Bryan to the canvas, face first. On his attempt to beat the referees count, Bryan fell face down on the canvas again and counted out. In the post-fight interview, Dubois said, "No disrespect to anyone, but Trevor's '0' had to go. That's just it." Trainer Shane McGuigan said they would like to make a defence of the title in London and mentioned Dillian Whyte as a potential opponent. The win also meant Dubois would become mandatory challenger to unified heavyweight champion Oleksandr Usyk.

On 2 August, Dubois filed a lawsuit against Don King Productions. The documents alleged that Don King was yet to pay Dubois his full purse. According to Dubois, between $463,274.32 and $938,274.32 was still owed to him. There was also uncertainty as to whether the IRS or the WBA sanction fees were already paid by King on Dubois' behalf. A couple of weeks later the case was settled and Dubois was paid in full.

==== Dubois vs. Lerena ====
In October 2022, Dubois was in talks to make his first defence of the WBA (Regular) heavyweight title against 43-year-old Australian heavyweight Lucas Browne. However, due to his age, the BBBofC immediately refused to sanction the contest. Within a couple of days, ESPN reported #13 ranked Kevin Lerena had been offered the fight and accepted. A deal was being finalised to take place in December 2022.

On 20 October, a press release was put out which announced Dubois would make the first defence of his WBA (Regular) heavyweight title against Kevin Lerena (28–1, 14 KOs) on 3 December, at the Tottenham Hotspur Stadium in London, England on the undercard of Tyson Fury vs. Derek Chisora III. Lerena had not lost since November 2014 and was coming into this bout on a 17-fight win streak. Both boxers trash talked during the final presser. Dubois weighed 240.25 pounds and Lerena came in at a lean 231 pounds.

Although he was knocked down in the first round 3 times, Dubois prevailed and won by 3rd round technical knockout. Dubois was dropped by Lerena's left hand on all three occasions. Dubois still looked hurt going into round 2. In round 3, Dubois dropped Lerena with a massive right hand to the head. Dubois then landed several big uppercuts to put Lerena on the canvas as the bell rang. Referee Howard Foster stopped the fight as Lerena picked himself up from the canvas.

According to Barry McGuigan, Dubois was due to be side-lined for several months due to an ACL tear he suffered in win over Lerena.

A few months later, reports confirmed that Dubois had split with trainer Shane McGuigan and partnered with Don Charles ahead of the potential world title fight with Oleksandr Usyk in the Summer of 2023. Dubois had been with McGuigan since May 2021 and won all four of his fights with him via stoppage.

==== Dubois vs. Usyk ====
On 3 April 2023, the WBA officially ordered the world title consolidation between WBA 'regular' titleholder Dubois and the unified heavyweight champion Oleksandr Usyk (20–0, 13 KOs). Both parties were given a 30-day negotiation period. Earlier reports suggested the fight could take place in London or Manchester in England. Although no date or location had been confirmed, Alex Krassyuk stated the fight could take place in a stadium in Poland. In May 2023, purse bids were held. Usyk's career-long promoter Krassyuk gained control of the fight with a massive bid of $8,057,000, which was more than the $5,620,050 submitted by Queensberry Promotions. A fight date in August was being eyed. As per the purse splits, Usyk was to take home $6,042,750 (75% of the winning bid) and Dubois was to take a career-high $2,014,250 payday. The fight took place on 26 August at the Stadion Wroclaw in Wrocław, Poland for Usyk's WBA (Super), IBF, WBO, IBO and The Ring titles. The date aligned with Ukraine's Independence Day. An attendance of around 24,000 was expected.

While Usyk retained his titles via ninth-round stoppage, there was controversy surrounding the events of the fifth round, when Usyk dropped to the canvas following a punch from Dubois that was ruled a low blow by referee Luis Pabon. Accordingly, Usyk was given a maximum of five minutes to recover, but despite declaring he was ready to continue, Pabon urged Usyk to take more time out. Usyk ultimately used three minutes and forty-five seconds before the fight resumed. Usyk forced Dubois to take a knee in the eighth round and again in the ninth round, where he was counted out. According to CompuBox stats, Usyk had outlanded Dubois in every round of the fight, landing 88 of 359 punches thrown (24.5%) to Dubois' 47 of 290 (16.2%). Dubois failed to land double digits in any round of the fight.

Debate followed regarding the fifth round, many observers believed the low blow was a legal punch and thus potentially resulted in a KO victory for Dubois. In his post-fight interview, Dubois said, "I didn't think that was a low blow. I thought that landed, and I've been cheated out of victory tonight." However, Usyk's promoter Alex Krassyuk argued "The belly button is the line. Anything low of that is a low blow." This argument was echoed by others including boxers Tony Bellew and Liam Smith.

=== Resurgence in Riyadh ===
==== Dubois vs. Miller ====
In November 2023, Riyadh Season announced a blockbuster card which would take place on 23 December 2023 with Anthony Joshua vs. Otto Wallin as the headline. One of the undercard bouts announced was Dubois against American heavyweight Jarrell Miller. Miller was coming into this bout having defeated Lucas Browne in March 2023.

Miller weighed in at 333 pounds, nearly 100 pounds more than Dubois, who came in at 239 pounds. Dubois put on a show and likely the most entertaining victory on the card, stopping Miller in the tenth round. Dubois seemed anxious early on from the pressure which was being applied by Miller, but as the rounds went by, Dubois picked his shots and landed heavy punches on Miller. By the tenth round, Dubois was in control and landing power shots. Miller stood and took the punishment before the referee stopped the fight with only 10 seconds of the fight left. Both boxers embraced at the end of the fight. Dubois said the confidence which was missing had come back after this fight. Speaking to DAZN after the fight, he said, "It really mattered tonight. I had to dig deep. I came through it and I showed my heart." Dubois landed a career-high 208 punches on Miller, which was a 40% connect rate. Miller only connected 107 of his 379 punches thrown.

==== Dubois vs. Hrgović ====
Following the success of the Day of Reckoning card in December 2023, there were talks and a verbal agreement between Eddie Hearn and Frank Warren to put on a future card with each picking five boxers from their promotion at specified weight classes. In March the weight classes were confirmed. On 15 April 2024 at a press conference, it was confirmed that Dubois would face IBF top ranked contender Filip Hrgović on 1 June at the Saudi Embassy in Istanbul, co-featuring on a card that was headlined by a bout between fellow heavyweights Zhilei Zhang and Deontay Wilder. The IBF later de-sanctioned the fight for the vacant IBF 'interim' heavyweight championship due to suspicions about the venue, but immediately created a sub sanctioning body named the MBSBA (Mohammed bin Salman boxing association.) Hrgović reported that he went into the bout with a serious but unspecified injury incurred during the preparations for the fight and had just recovered from a virus two weeks before the fight. Hrgovic apparently decided that he had waited for the fight for two years and could not risk pulling out of such an opportunity. Dubois tipped the scales at 245.8 pounds and Hrgović came in heavier at 247.4 pounds.

In what was considered his biggest win to date, Dubois defeated Hrgović via eighth-round doctor's stoppage due to cuts. The win meant that Dubois won the newly named MBSBA title. Hrgović started the fight landing right hands at will in rounds 1, 2, 3 and keeping Dubois off balance. Dubois grew more confident after cutting Hrgovic with a stiff jab or hook. In rounds 6 and 7 Dubois pressed the action, sometimes leading with his forehead (which eventually created another cut on the opposite eyebrow.) In round 8 the referee, recognizing Hrgovic was at risk of bad injuries, stopped the action and brought in the ringside doctor to assess; and ultimately stopped the fight. Hrgovic admitted that he underestimated Dubois and the fight got out of his control...but contrary to the article by "the boxing scene" the result was far from a "destruction". Over the 8 rounds, Dubois landed 116 of 346 punches thrown (33.5%) and Hrgović landed 96 of his 402 thrown (23.9%). The night ended with Queensberry promotions winning a clean slate of all five fights against Matchroom Boxing.

=== IBF heavyweight champion ===
==== Dubois vs. Joshua ====
On 26 June 2024 Dubois was elevated to full IBF champion after Oleksandr Usyk vacated the belt. It was announced that he would be making his first defence of the title against former two-time unified champion Anthony Joshua at Wembley Stadium in London on 21 September.

The fighters weighed in the day before their fight in front of Nelson's Column at Trafalgar Square, in London. Joshua weighed in at 252.5 lbs, almost 4 lbs heavier than Dubois' weight of 248.6 lbs. This was marginally heavier for Joshua compared to his fight against Francis Ngannou 6 months prior, while Dubois' weight was a new career-heaviest for him, 3 lbs heavier than his previous record.

Dubois, despite being the reigning IBF champion, walked to the ring first "very composed, almost seemingly too relaxed" whilst Joshua entered the ring second and "seemed tight during his ring walk", according to Joseph Santoliquito of The Ring. Dubois retained his title by defeating Joshua by KO in the fifth round after a dominant performance. The result was considered a major upset, as Dubois was the pre-betting underdog going into fight. Dubois immediately started boxing aggressively, and knocked Joshua to the canvas at the end of the first round with a huge overhand right to Joshua's chin. Joshua was able to beat the count, but seemed to be on unsteady legs as the bell signalled the end of the first round. Momentum seemed to be in Dubois' favour, and he knocked Joshua down for the second time in round 3 with a left to the chin: Joshua's gloves had touched the canvas, but the referee allowed Dubois to continue unloading punches which eventually did trigger an official knockdown. The fourth round saw Joshua hit the canvas twice more, although one of those occasions was ruled a slip. In the fifth round, Joshua seemed to find a way back into the fight when he landed a right hand which seemed to force Dubois back into a corner. However, Dubois caught Joshua on the chin with a counter right hand as Joshua was attempting to land a right uppercut of his own, which sent Joshua sprawling to the canvas again, and this time unable to beat the count. The fight was called off after 59 seconds of the fifth round, with Dubois retaining his IBF heavyweight title via fifth round knockout. After the fight, a victorious Dubois questioned the crowd who had been largely pro-AJ prior to the opening bell: "Are you not entertained?" Over the five rounds, Dubois landed 79 of his 196 punches thrown with a connect rate of 40% and Joshua landed only 32 of his 117 punches thrown with a connect rate of 27%.

==== Cancelled Parker defence ====
Following the win, it was said a rematch clause was attached to the contract and a return fight would take place around February 2025. Many pundits and fans alike called for Joshua to retire. A couple of weeks later, Joshua pulled out of the rematch. This was due to injury concerns and being unable to have enough time to prepare. Promoter Frank Warren revealed Dubois would be making a defence of his IBF belt in February regardless. The IBF gave Dubois and his team the green light to make a voluntary defence, with an expiry of 22 April 2025. Hearn stated Joshua would wait for the outcome of the heavyweight rematch between Oleksandr Usyk vs. Tyson Fury before making his next move. This opened up a list of potential opponents for Dubois, including the likes of Fabio Wardley, Zhilei Zhang, Joseph Parker, Agit Kabayel and Martin Bakole amongst the contenders. At the same time, Kabayel and Bakole had been ordered by the IBF for a final eliminator. Parker was leading the way to capture the fight.

On 2 December 2024 Riyadh Season announced the rematch between Artur Beterbiev and Dmitry Bivol to take place at the Kingdom Arena. In the co-feature bout, Dubois would make a second defence of his IBF heavyweight title against interim WBO heavyweight champion Joseph Parker (35–3, 23 KOs). The card was scheduled to take place on 22 February 2025. On 10 January 2025, Ring magazine reported that Parker would automatically lose his status as interim WBO champion once the opening bell rings. This is a standard rule within sanctioning bodies as the interim title is classed as a secondary title and not eligible to unify with full champions from another organisation. The president said they would allow him to enter the ring and be introduced as the interim WBO champion, but would become vacant soon after.

Dubois attended the media workouts on Tuesday, however Ring magazine reported the following day that he fell ill and was being assessed by doctors to see if he would be able to make the title defence. The names of Lawrence Okolie, David Adeleye and Mourad Aliev were brought up as a possible replacement. Dubois did not attend the press conference. Shortly afterwards, much to everyone's surprise, Martin Bakole (21–1, 16 KOs) was named as the replacement. He had to fly in from the Congo, and borrowed Dubois' gloves for the fight. Parker stopped Bakole in the second round and then proceeded to call out Dubois again, as well as Oleksandr Usyk.

==== Dubois vs. Usyk II ====
On 12 March 2025, Sky Sports reported that Dubois was in talks to fight Oleksandr Usyk in a rematch, for the undisputed heavyweight title. Alexander Krassyuk mentioned Wembley Stadium as an option for the venue. On 13 March, WBO president Gustavo Olivieri ordered for Usyk to make a mandatory defence against interim WBO champion Joseph Parker. Both parties were given 30 days to negotiate a deal before purse bids are called. On 4 April, Dubois told Ring magazine the priority was to fight Usyk in July. He did not rule out fighting Parker or Derek Chisora, who was ranked #2 by the IBF. The IBF stated they would grant an exception for Dubois vs. Usyk, however if the fight did not materialise, then Chisora would be called as mandatory. On 10 April, the WBO received a petition to allow Dubois vs. Usyk to take place for the undisputed title.

On 27 April, the rematch between Usyk (23–0, 14 KOs) and Dubois was announced for the undisputed heavyweight title to be held at Wembley Stadium in London on 19 July 2025. WBO president Olivier explained his organisations' decision to allow the unification fight as it allowed the heavyweight division to once again crown an undisputed champion. Parker would be next called as mandatory however, once the fight is over. The morning after the fight was announced, the two had their first face-off on the field of Wembley Stadium. Words were exchanged, leading to Dubois shoving Usyk, before security intervened. Usyk called it a sign of weakness on Dubois' part. Within 24 hours after they went on sale, more than 60,000 tickets were sold. By the end of June, 78,000 had been sold. Warren stated when 84,000 have sold, an increase to 94,000 would be applied. Usyk weighed a career-high 227.3 pounds and Dubois weighed 243.8 pounds, 10 pounds heavier than he weighed in the first fight.

There was heavy rain on the day but there was still a crowd of around 90,000 to watch the fight. In an impressive display of skill, Usyk dispatched Dubois in their rematch, securing a knockout in the fifth round of a one-sided contest. With this victory, Usyk once again unified the heavyweight division, earning the title of undisputed champion for the second time in his career. In the opening round, Usyk showcased a sharp jab, establishing control early in the fight. However, by the second round, Dubois rebounded effectively, gaining a slight advantage. In Round 3, Dubois was briefly rattled by a powerful left hook, but Usyk's intelligent footwork effectively prevented Dubois from finding any opportunities to retaliate. In the fifth round, Usyk first sent Dubois to the canvas with a right hook to the temple. After Dubois returned to his feet, in the next sequence Usyk delivered the decisive knockout with a flush left hook. Usyk joked that this left hook was called Ivan, "Ivan is a Ukrainian name. Ivan is a big guy who lives in a village and works for his family. It's a hard punch, Ivan." After being dropped the second time, he rose to his knees, but allowed himself to be counted out by referee Mike Griffin. The towel was also thrown in towards the end of the count. At the time of stoppage, the judges scorecards read 40–36, 39–37 and 39–37, in favour of Usyk. According to CompuBox, Usyk landed 57 of 153 punches thrown (37.3%) and Dubois landed 35 of his 179 thrown (19.6%). When asked about his age and coming towards the end of his career, Usyk responded, "Thirty-eight is a young guy, 38 is only the start." Immediately after the fight, Usyk rejected the suggestion he might now retire, naming Tyson Fury, Anthony Joshua, Joseph Parker and Derek Chisora as possible opponents in his next fight.

Controversy within team Dubois unfolded as it was reported on the day of the fight, his father Stanley hosted an extravagant party at their Essex home. This prompted concerns regarding his preparation and mental state leading up to the match. Daniel was present at the party, which reportedly attracted around 70 guests, many of whom were not personally known to Daniel. Trainer Don Charles, defended the party and described it as more of a gathering rather than a typical party, with the intention of energizing Daniel before the fight. According to Charles, a similar gathering took place prior to Dubois' fight against Joshua, although there were fewer guests. The situation has sparked major worries among boxing enthusiasts and experts alike. Dubois arrived at the Stadium just under 90 minutes prior to his fight, a timing that many critics argue is inadequate for proper mental and physical preparation for a bout of this magnitude. While some viewed it as a well-meaning attempt to boost morale, others argued that it compromised Dubois' preparation and focus, leading to a disappointing outcome in the ring. The event became a focal point of discussion regarding the unconventional methods used by his team and the influence of his father in his boxing career. Charles stated an "internal inquest" would be held and questions would be asked by Queensberry Promotions.

On 12 August, it was reported that Sam Jones has joined Team Dubois in an advisory capacity. Additionally, Kieran Farrell stepped down from his position as assistant trainer, having been in that role since March 2024. A few days later it was revealed that Dubois had parted ways with Don Charles and would train with Tony Sims moving forward, though Dubois would later reunite with Don Charles in January 2026.

=== WBO heavyweight champion ===
On 7 October 2025, the IBF confirmed a second heavyweight contender, as Dubois consented to an eliminator match against Frank Sanchez. The winner of the bout would be in position to challenge the undisputed champion Oleksandr Usyk. Prior to this agreement, the IBF had encountered refusals from additional contenders, including Filip Hrgovic, Efe Ajagba, and Moses Itauma, all of whom were mandated to face Sanchez. Both teams had until 22 October to finalize an agreement; if a deal was not reached, the bout will proceed to a purse bid. The fight was officially ordered the next day. Purse bids were originally scheduled for 13 November, however on 20 November, Queensberry stated that Dubois had changed his mind and pulled out of the negotiations. In a statement, they mentioned that the IBF eliminator held little value to Dubois, as it was fourth in line in terms of a mandatory shot to fight Usyk.

==== Dubois vs. Wardley ====
On 10 February 2026, it was reported that a fight between Dubois and WBO heavyweight champion Fabio Wardley (20–0–1, 17 KOs) was being finalised. Wardley was coming off an upset stoppage win over Joseph Parker in 2025, where he claimed the interim WBO title, before being elevated to full championship status. Days later, the fight was officially announced to take place on 9 May at the Co-op Live in Manchester on DAZN PPV, under Queensberry Promotions. On the announcement, Wardley stated he only wanted to take on big challenges, noting this was a voluntary defence and wanted to fight Dubois. The launch press conference was heated. Wardley was officially announced as a world champion for the first time, despite being elevated in November. Both teams exchanged sharp verbal jabs. Dubois’s manager, Sam Jones, predicted a quick and violent win for Dubois. Wardley’s manager, Michael Ofo, mentioned Dubois’s return to trainer Don Charles, implying that Dubois’s camp was insecure. Wardley criticized Dubois’s past losses, suggesting Dubois had a reputation for quitting under pressure, pointing to defeats against Joe Joyce and Usyk. Dubois responded, vowing to hand Wardley his first career defeat by knockout. Both boxers maintained a respectful tone publicly, but the tension was evident when Dubois refused a handshake after their first face-off. Charles said his time apart from Dubois should not be considered a split, but rather a break. Warren spoke about the importance of avoiding any unnecessary delays, mentioning that the pre-fight "party" incident before his loss to Usyk would not be repeated. With the fight taking place in Manchester, it allowed for better control over logistics, as boxers would stay in hotels. Warren was extremely frustrated by the situation. He said, "When he was late getting there, I was tearing my hair out…" After the fight, they had a serious discussion to address what went wrong and to have a stricter structure in place.

Dubois stated that Wardley had not been winning because he was better, but rather because he had been getting lucky, especially in recent fights. Dubois believed that luck would run out when they fought. He referenced Wardley's fights against Justis Huni and Joseph Parker, where Wardley was behind on the judges' scorecards but ended up winning via late stoppages. His argument was that Wardley kept escaping defeat through late knockouts rather than dominating fights. Dubois received some criticism from his former trainer, Shane McGuigan, with whom he won four fights. McGuigan said that Dubois had the skills to win the fight easily by using his jab and boxing at a smart and controlled pace; however, he believed that Dubois would not stick to his plan. He believed a shootout favoured Wardley.

Pre-fight, Wardley made some comments that attracted attention and stirred controversy. In a social media clip, Wardley was asked what Dubois would be if he weren’t a boxer. He replied, "A bin man or something like that." Dubois took the remark as disrespectful. At the final press conference, he responded with verbal retaliation, saying he would "collect that trash" and "put it right in the ring." Wardley denied any insult, claiming the comment was not meant negatively. He said there was "no disrespect" and that being a bin man is not a bad job. Wardley weighed 242.2 pounds, just under half a pound lighter than in his last victory against Parker. Dubois came in at a career-high 251.7 pounds, nearly 8 pounds heavier than in his last fight.

On the night, Dubois arrived late to the arena, reportedly due to traffic delays on his way to the venue. There was a sold-out, boxing attendance record of 18,212 in attendance at the arena. After a poor start, which saw Dubois dropped twice in the opening three rounds, he managed to regroup, dominate and eventually force a stoppage, winning the WBO title and, becoming a two-time heavyweight world champion. Dubois went down in the first round when he took an overhand right punch during the first ten seconds of the fight, then went down two rounds later by the same overhand right. Other than the knockdowns, Dubois continuously boxed his way to winning rounds two and four through six after hurting Wardley numerous times to tie up the scorecards in the first half. By the second half, Dubois began to stagger Wardley with power shots, building up damage on Wardley's right eye and to his nose. Wardley continued to fight back with his own punches, but Dubois bested him in exchanges severely weakened Wardley to the point that referee Howard Foster had to intervene in the round 11. Prior to the stoppage, Wardley was checked over by the ringside doctor twice, who allowed the fight to continue. Dubois landed 179 of 391 punches thrown (46%), more than Wardley, who landed 97 of 358 (27%).

During the post-fight, Dubois said, "It was a war… thank you Fabio for that. It was an honour to be in the ring with him. I know I’ve got heart… I’m a warrior." Wardley did not stay in the ring, but released a statement after the fight, "My body failed me, but not my heart." He congratulated Dubois and called it, "a great fight worthy of the history books." Warren was highly emotional, calling it the best heavyweight match he had ever staged. "You witnessed something special tonight, ultra special. Two men bearing their hearts and souls in the ring. Neither of them taking a backward step." Warren also confirmed a rematch clause existed in the contract. Wardley's trainer, Ben Davison, later admitted the fight "could have been stopped earlier" but it was difficult because Wardley kept responding.

==== Dubois vs. Wardley II ====
On 15 May, less than a week following the loss, Wardley activated the rematch clause. He told Sky Sports, "It was a fight for the ages but I made some mistakes that I will rectify in the rematch. Congratulations to Daniel but I'm coming for you... and my belt." Warren confirmed that a rematch was being planned for autumn. Due to strong demand and a sold-out arena for their first bout, the sequel was expected to take place in a stadium. Dubois made it clear that he had no hesitation about a rematch, even after the physically demanding first fight. His stance on the rematch was that it should take place sooner rather than later. In July, Wardley's manager Michael Ofo, said the rematch clause had been activated but would only happen when Wardley was fully ready, and likely not in the next three months. He stated there was a deadline for when the rematch had to take place by. In August, Frank Warren gave an update, announcing 17 October as the potential date, with the Co-op Live under consideration again to host the fight.

On 29 August, the rematch was announced to take place on 17 October at The O2 Arena in London. After the announcement was made, Dubois predicted "another dominant win," and Wardley said the rematch would be "revenge". In the lead-up, Wardley rejected concerns that he was returning too quickly after their first fight. He pointed out his successful rematch win over Frazer Clarke and argued that he had shown his ability to make adjustments between fights. He stated he could "adjust my game plan and come out on top". He also mentioned the two knockdowns he scored in the first bout, noting that he could overturn the defeat. During the DAZN face-off, Dubois was confident that he would stop Wardley quicker. He said, "I’m a better fighter, improved fighter. I’ll finish it quicker. I’m gonna school him again, that experience and amateur background that you can't buy, that's what I've got on my side. Even without that, I've got his number. This time around, it’s going to be more clinical."

Michael Ofo, Wardley's manager, alleged that Dubois had used dirty tactics in the first fight. He called for 'a stronger referee' in the rematch. Riz Khan, Dubois' manager, said this was not true, defending Dubois, stating he was 'stronger, fitter and sharper' and would defeat Wardley again. Both boxers weighed in career heaviest. Dubois weighed 253.9 pounds, and Wardley was 248.3 pounds. After weighing in, Wardley said, "It's simply seek and destroy now. All the talking, all the words, fun and games are ticked off. It's laser focus for tomorrow night." Dubois, who was more confident going into the rematch, said, "I know him now. I know what to expect and I'm just ready to go out there and do my job. I'm ready for whatever comes on Saturday."

A sell-out crowd of 19,000 packed the arena. Unlike the first contest, the rematch was entirely one-sided. Dubois came out strong, dropping Wardley with a straight right hand in the opening 17 seconds of the fight. Wardley did well to survive the round. Dubois remained calm and unloaded a barrage of heavy shots in the second round. As referee Steve Gray was stepping in to stop the fight, Wardley's trainer Ben Davison also threw in the towel. The time of stoppage was 2:21 of round two. During the post-fight, Dubois paid respect to Wardley, "Fabio is a great boy, coming in for the second time, but it was my time and my era. I had my intentions, bad intentions from the beginning." Wardley did not make any excuses after the fight was over. He said, "I didn't execute the game plan properly tonight. That was all. I hold my hands up to that. It's entirely down to me... there is no shame in a loss when you're testing yourself against the best." IBF champion Filip Hrgović later stepped into the ring to congratulate Dubois and to tease a possible rematch. Warren noted that Hrgović might first need to defend his title in Croatia against his mandatory challenger and suggested that Dubois could unify against the winner of Tyson Fury vs. Anthony Joshua. Dubois landed 60 of his 119 punches (50.4), 51 of which were power shots. He did not allow Wardley to land, crediting him with only 4 landed punches from 27 thrown. He landed two jabs and two power punches.

== Awards ==
Dubois was named British Boxing Board of Control 2024 Boxer of the Year.

== Personal life ==
Dubois' father is from Grenada, while his mother is from Nigeria. His younger sister Caroline Dubois is also a professional boxer and World Champion. As an amateur she represented Great Britain and in 2018 became the -60 kg European Junior, World Youth and Youth Olympic champion. She is the unified WBC, WBO and Ring magazine female lightweight champion of the world. In an interview, Caroline Dubois stated that she does not keep contact with Daniel or their father.

== Professional boxing record ==
27 fights	24 wins	3 losses
By knockout	23	3
By decision	1	0

No.	Result	Record	Opponent	Type	Round, time	Date	Location	Notes
27	Win	24–3	Fabio Wardley	TKO	2 (12), 2:21	17 Oct 2026	The O2 Arena, London, England	Retained WBO heavyweight title
26	Win	23–3	Fabio Wardley	TKO	11 (12), 0:28	9 May 2026	Co-op Live, Manchester, England	Won WBO heavyweight title
25	Loss	22–3	Oleksandr Usyk	KO	5 (12), 1:52	19 Jul 2025	Wembley Stadium, London, England	Lost IBF heavyweight title; For WBA (Super), WBC, WBO, IBO, and The Ring heavyweight titles
24	Win	22–2	Anthony Joshua	KO	5 (12), 0:59	21 Sep 2024	Wembley Stadium, London, England	Retained IBF heavyweight title
23	Win	21–2	Filip Hrgović	TKO	8 (12), 0:57	1 Jun 2024	Kingdom Arena, Riyadh, Saudi Arabia	Won vacant IBF interim heavyweight title
22	Win	20–2	Jarrell Miller	TKO	10 (10), 2:52	23 Dec 2023	Kingdom Arena, Riyadh, Saudi Arabia	
21	Loss	19–2	Oleksandr Usyk	KO	9 (12), 1:48	26 Aug 2023	Stadion Wrocław, Wrocław, Poland	For WBA (Super), IBF, WBO, IBO, and The Ring heavyweight titles
20	Win	19–1	Kevin Lerena	TKO	3 (12), 3:00	3 Dec 2022	Tottenham Hotspur Stadium, London, England	Retained WBA (Regular) heavyweight title
19	Win	18–1	Trevor Bryan	KO	4 (12), 1:58	11 Jun 2022	Casino Miami, Miami, Florida, US	Won WBA (Regular) heavyweight title
18	Win	17–1	Joe Cusumano	TKO	1 (10), 2:10	29 Aug 2021	Rocket Mortgage FieldHouse, Cleveland, Ohio, US	
17	Win	16–1	Bogdan Dinu	KO	2 (12), 0:31	5 Jun 2021	Telford International Centre, Telford, England	Won vacant WBA interim heavyweight title
16	Loss	15–1	Joe Joyce	KO	10 (12), 0:36	28 Nov 2020	Church House, London, England	Lost British, Commonwealth, WBC Silver, and WBO International heavyweight titles; For vacant European heavyweight title
15	Win	15–0	Ricardo Snijders	TKO	2 (12), 0:20	29 Aug 2020	BT Sport Studios, London, England	Retained WBO International heavyweight title
14	Win	14–0	Kyotaro Fujimoto	KO	2 (12), 2:10	21 Dec 2019	Copper Box Arena, London, England	Retained WBO International heavyweight title; Won vacant WBC Silver heavyweight title
13	Win	13–0	Ebenezer Tetteh	TKO	1 (12), 2:10	27 Sep 2019	Royal Albert Hall, London, England	Won vacant Commonwealth and WBO International heavyweight titles
12	Win	12–0	Nathan Gorman	KO	5 (12), 2:41	13 Jul 2019	The O2 Arena, London, England	Won vacant British heavyweight title
11	Win	11–0	Richard Lartey	KO	4 (10), 1:50	27 Apr 2019	Wembley Arena, London, England	Won vacant WBO Global heavyweight title
10	Win	10–0	Răzvan Cojanu	KO	2 (10), 2:48	8 Mar 2019	Royal Albert Hall, London, England	Won vacant WBO European heavyweight title
9	Win	9–0	Kevin Johnson	PTS	10	6 Oct 2018	Leicester Arena, Leicester, England	
8	Win	8–0	Tom Little	TKO	5 (10), 0:58	23 Jun 2018	The O2 Arena, London, England	Won vacant English heavyweight title
7	Win	7–0	DL Jones	TKO	3 (10), 2:23	24 Feb 2018	York Hall, London, England	Retained Southern Area heavyweight title
6	Win	6–0	Dorian Darch	TKO	2 (10), 0:51	9 Dec 2017	Copper Box Arena, London, England	
5	Win	5–0	AJ Carter	KO	1 (10), 0:48	16 Sep 2017	Copper Box Arena, London, England	Won vacant Southern Area heavyweight title
4	Win	4–0	Mauricio Barragan	KO	2 (10), 1:41	8 Jul 2017	Copper Box Arena, London, England	Won vacant WBC Youth heavyweight title
3	Win	3–0	David Howe	KO	1 (4), 0:40	20 May 2017	Copper Box Arena, London, England	
2	Win	2–0	Blaise Mendouo	TKO	2 (4), 0:48	22 Apr 2017	Leicester Arena, Leicester, England	
1	Win	1–0	Marcus Kelly	TKO	1 (4), 0:35	8 Apr 2017	Manchester Arena, Manchester, England	

== Titles in boxing ==
=== Major world titles ===
- IBF heavyweight champion (200+ lbs)
- WBO heavyweight champion (200+ lbs)

=== Secondary major world titles ===
- WBA (Regular) heavyweight champion (200+ lbs)

=== Interim/Silver world titles ===
- WBA interim heavyweight champion (200+ lbs)
- IBF interim heavyweight champion (200+ lbs)
- WBC Silver heavyweight champion (200+ lbs)

=== Regional/International ===
- WBO International heavyweight champion (200+ lbs)
- WBO Global heavyweight champion (200+ lbs)
- WBO European heavyweight champion (200+ lbs)
- WBC Youth heavyweight champion (200+ lbs)
- Commonwealth heavyweight champion (200+ lbs)
- British heavyweight champion (200+ lbs)
- English heavyweight Champion (200+ lbs)
- Southern Area heavyweight champion (200+ lbs)

== See also ==
- List of male boxers
- Notable boxing families
- List of British world boxing champions
- List of world heavyweight boxing champions

Sporting positions
Regional boxing titles
Vacant Title last held by Tom Schwarz	WBC Youth heavyweight champion 8 July – September 2017; Vacated	Vacant Title next held by Peter Kadiru
Vacant Title last held by Dominic Akinlade	Southern Area heavyweight champion 16 September 2017 – 23 June 2018	Vacant Title next held by Johnny Fisher
Vacant Title last held by John McDermott	English heavyweight champion 23 June 2018 – 13 July 2019	Vacant Title next held by Fabio Wardley
Vacant Title last held by Christian Hammer	WBO European heavyweight champion 8 March 2018 – April 2018; Vacated	Vacant Title next held by Ali Eren Demirezen
Vacant Title last held by Evgenyi Romanov	WBO Global heavyweight champion 27 April – June 2019; Vacated	Vacant Title next held by Evgenyi Romanov
Vacant Title last held by Hughie Fury	British heavyweight champion 13 July 2019 – 28 November 2020	Succeeded by Joe Joyce
Vacant Title last held by Joe Joyce	Commonwealth heavyweight champion 27 September 2019 – 28 November 2020	Succeeded by Joe Joyce
Vacant Title last held by Dillian Whyte	WBO International heavyweight champion 27 September 2019 – 28 November 2020	Succeeded by Joe Joyce
Vacant Title last held by Dillian Whyte	WBC Silver heavyweight champion 21 December 2019 – 28 November 2020	Succeeded by Joe Joyce
World boxing titles
Vacant Title last held by Trevor Bryan	WBA heavyweight champion Interim title 5 June – 25 August 2021; Stripped	Vacant Title next held by Fabio Wardley
Preceded by Trevor Bryan	WBA heavyweight champion Regular title 11 June 2022 − 26 August 2023; Failed to win Super title	Vacant Title next held by Mahmoud Charr
New title	IBF heavyweight champion Interim title 1 June − 25 June 2024; Promoted	Vacant
Vacant Title last held by Oleksandr Usyk	IBF heavyweight champion 26 June 2024 – 19 July 2025	Succeeded by Oleksandr Usyk
Preceded by Fabio Wardley	WBO heavyweight champion 9 May 2026 – present	Incumbent
Awards
Previous: Junto Nakatani; KO12 Andrew Moloney	The Ring Knockout of the Year; KO5 Anthony Joshua; 2024	Next: Brian Norman Jr. KO5 Jin Sasaki
