= Tyson Fury vs. Oleksandr Usyk =

2024 professional boxing match

Ring of Fire
- Promotional poster of the event for DAZN
- Date: 18 May 2024
- Venue: Kingdom Arena, Riyadh, Saudi Arabia
- Title(s) on the line: WBA (Super), WBC, IBF, WBO, IBO and The Ring undisputed heavyweight championship

Tale of the tape
| Boxer | Tyson Fury | Oleksandr Usyk |
| Nickname | The Gypsy King | The Cat |
| Hometown | Manchester, England | Simferopol, Ukraine |
| Pre-fight record | 34–0–1 (24 KOs) | 21–0 (14 KOs) |
| Age | 35 years, 9 months | 37 years, 4 months |
| Height | 6 ft 9 in (206 cm) | 6 ft 3 in (191 cm) |
| Weight | 262 lb (119 kg) | 223 1/2 lb (101 kg) |
| Style | Orthodox | Southpaw |
| Recognition | WBC; Heavyweight Champion; The Ring/TBRB; No. 1 Ranked Heavyweight | WBA (Super), IBF, WBO, IBO, The Ring and TBRB; Heavyweight Champion; The Ring No. 3 ranked pound for pound fighter 2-division world champion |

Result
- Usyk wins by 12-round split decision (115–112, 114–113, 113–114)

Tyson Fury vs. Oleksandr Usyk, billed as Ring of Fire, was a professional boxing match contested on 18 May 2024, for the WBA (Super), WBC, IBF, WBO, IBO and The Ring undisputed heavyweight championship.

It was scheduled to take place on 17 February 2024 at Kingdom Arena in Riyadh, Saudi Arabia, then postponed due to a facial injury sustained by Fury in training. It was rescheduled the next day and took place on 18 May 2024 at the same venue. Usyk won by split decision.

The rematch between Fury and Usyk was held on 21 December 2024, also at the Kingdom Arena. Usyk would win by unanimous decision.

== Background and buildup ==
The fight crowned the first undisputed heavyweight champion in the modern era since Lennox Lewis in 2000, as well as the first in the four-belt era. In addition to the four sanctioned belts, special commemorative belts were made specifically for the fight on 18 May 2024. Queensbury Promotions made a special edition belt for the undisputed heavyweight. Then, the WBC also made the Fury-Usyk belt, which was blessed by Pope Francis, the head of the Roman Catholic Church.

On 25 October 2023, Fury and Usyk took to social media to announce that they had signed for a bout, with a date of 23 December being reported but not officially announced. It was also reported that Anthony Joshua vs. Deontay Wilder would serve as the co-feature. Then, on 28 October, after Fury defeated former UFC Heavyweight Champion Francis Ngannou, he demanded that the bout with Usyk must be postponed because of injuries he sustained in the fight, despite Usyk stating that they were contracted for 23 December 2023. On 29 October, it was announced that the bout would take place in early 2024.

On 16 November, the bout was officially announced to take place on 17 February 2024 in Riyadh, Saudi Arabia, with a launch press conference in London. Again, the fight was officially postponed on 2 February 2024, with the idea of rescheduling for 2024 once a doctor could determine the recovery time for a cut sustained by Tyson Fury in training. Fury's promoter Queensberry Promotions confirmed the injury. The whole card was rescheduled for 18 May 2024; the decision was made quickly by the event's organizer in Saudi Arabia, Turki Alalshikh.

In addition to being the first bout for the undisputed heavyweight championship since Evander Holyfield vs. Lennox Lewis II in November 1999, it was also the first time two undefeated heavyweights had fought for the undisputed title since Evander Holyfield vs. Riddick Bowe in November 1993.

=== Pay Per View ===
The bout was covered by DAZN PPV globally. Viewers in Middle East and North African countries could watch the event via Webook. Also, in the UK and Ireland, the fight was aired live on both PPV's Sky and TNT Sports Box Office channels. And, in Ukraine, the fight was streamed live on MEGOGO. Then, in the US, the fight was streamed live via ESPN+ PPV.

== The fight ==
Fury was described by BBC Sport as showboating during the first round, during which Usyk landed a left hook. The three judges all agreed that the first round was 10–9 in favour of Usyk. In the second and third round, Usyk was moving forward, while Fury was moving backwards, in a somewhat even bout. Fury established momentum in the fourth round, with multiple uppercuts. In the fifth round, Fury started moving forward and focused on punches to Usyk's body. In the sixth round, Fury uppercutted Usyk's body and nose. In the seventh round, Fury started dominant, but Usyk began to throw better punches to the head. The three judges all agreed that the fifth, sixth, and seventh rounds were 10–9 in Fury's favour.

In the eighth round, Usyk landed a right punch that caused for Fury to touch his nose, then another Usyk right punch hurt Fury's right eye; Fury bled from the face at the end of the round, and this seemed to affect him in the next round. In the ninth round, Usyk landed an unanswered series of 14 punches, including several overhand lefts, during which and after Fury was wobbling and stumbling around into the ring ropes, which held him up. At this point, BBC Sport described Fury as being "seemingly out on his feet", while The Guardian reported that Fury's "eyes glazed", the "referee could have stopped the fight", and that "Fury has been down in the past but we've never seen him hurt this badly!" Referee Mark Nelson registered this as a knockdown of Fury (the eighth of Fury's career), and gave Fury a standing eight count, after which the round ended. Fury was "saved by the bell" in the ninth round, concurred Yahoo! Sports and the Associated Press. In the tenth round, Usyk did not rush his advantage, which allowed Fury to recover, but Usyk did continue to land occasional overhand lefts. The three judges all agreed that the eighth, ninth, and tenth rounds were 10–9, 10–8, and 10–9 respectively, in favour of Usyk.

In the eleventh round, Usyk continued to land left hands, but Fury showed some recovery to fight back. In the twelfth and final round, Fury came back with some right punches, and the judges recorded that he won it unanimously 10–9. The fight went down to the judges' scorecards, with Usyk defeating Fury by split decision, with judge Manuel Oliver Palermo scoring it 115–112 for Usyk, judge Craig Metcalfe scoring it 114–113 for Fury, and judge Mike Fitzgerald scoring it 114–113 for Usyk.

=== Statistics ===
| Punches | | Fury | Usyk |
|---|---|---|---|
| Jabs | Landed | 62 | 48 |
| Jabs | Thrown | 286 | 147 |
| Jabs | Percentage | 22% | 33% |
| Power | Landed | 95 | 122 |
| Power | Thrown | 210 | 260 |
| Power | Percentage | 45% | 47% |
| Total | Landed | 157 | 170 |
| Total | Thrown | 496 | 407 |
| Total | Percentage | 32% | 42% |
Source: Boxing Scene, CompuBox

== Card ==
| Weight class | | vs | | Method | Round | Time | Notes |
Main Card (PPV)
| Heavyweight | Oleksandr Usyk (c) | def. | Tyson Fury (c) | SD | 12 | | ^{Note 1} |
| Cruiserweight | Jai Opetaia (c) | def. | Mairis Briedis | UD | 12 | | ^{Note 2} |
| Super Featherweight | Anthony Cacace (c) | def. | Joe Cordina (c) | TKO | 8 (12) | 0:39 | ^{Note 3} |
| Heavyweight | Agit Kabayel | def. | Frank Sanchez | KO | 7 (12) | 2:29 |
| Heavyweight | Moses Itauma | def. | Ilja Mezencev | TKO | 2 (10) | 0:50 |
| Lightweight | Mark Chamberlain | def. | Joshua Oluwaseum Wahab | TKO | 1 (12) | 2:42 |
| Cruiserweight | Robin Sirwan Safar | def. | Sergey Kovalev | UD | 10 |
| Cruiserweight | David Nyika | def. | Michael Seitz | TKO | 4 (10) | 2:45 |
| Light-Heavyweight | Daniel Lupin | def. | Octavio Pudivitr | KO | 1 (10) | 1:47 |
| Featherweight | Isaac Lowe | def. | Hasibullah Ahmadi | PTS | 10 |

^Note 1 For WBA (Super), WBC, IBF, WBO, IBO, and The Ring heavyweight titles
^Note 2 For The Ring and vacant IBF cruiserweight titles
^Note 3 For IBF and IBO super-featherweight titles

=== Main event official scorecard ===
Middle East Professional Boxing Commission Official score card
| Title: WBA (Super), WBC, IBF, WBO, IBO, and The Ring heavyweight titles | | | | | Referee: Mark Nelson | | | | | Supervisor: Jose Mohan | | | | |
| Date: 18 May 2024 | | | | | Venue: Kingdom Arena, Riyadh, Saudi Arabia | | | | | Promoter: | | | | |
| Fury | | vs. | Usyk | | Fury | | vs. | Usyk | | Fury | | vs. | Usyk | |
| RS | TS | Rd | TS | RS | RS | TS | Rd | TS | RS | RS | TS | Rd | TS | RS |
| 9 | | 1 | | 10 | 9 | | 1 | | 10 | 9 | | 1 | | 10 |
| 10 | 19 | 2 | 19 | 9 | 10 | 19 | 2 | 19 | 9 | 9 | 18 | 2 | 20 | 10 |
| 9 | 28 | 3 | 29 | 10 | 9 | 28 | 3 | 29 | 10 | 10 | 28 | 3 | 29 | 9 |
| 9 | 37 | 4 | 39 | 10 | 10 | 38 | 4 | 38 | 9 | 10 | 38 | 4 | 38 | 9 |
| 10 | 47 | 5 | 48 | 9 | 10 | 48 | 5 | 47 | 9 | 10 | 48 | 5 | 38 | 9 |
| 10 | 57 | 6 | 57 | 9 | 10 | 58 | 6 | 56 | 9 | 10 | 58 | 6 | 56 | 9 |
| 10 | 67 | 7 | 66 | 9 | 10 | 68 | 7 | 65 | 9 | 10 | 68 | 7 | 65 | 9 |
| 9 | 76 | 8 | 76 | 10 | 9 | 77 | 8 | 75 | 10 | 9 | 77 | 8 | 75 | 10 |
| 8 | 84 | 9 | 86 | 10 | 8 | 85 | 9 | 85 | 10 | 8 | 85 | 9 | 85 | 10 |
| 9 | 93 | 10 | 96 | 10 | 9 | 94 | 10 | 95 | 10 | 9 | 94 | 10 | 95 | 10 |
| 9 | 102 | 11 | 106 | 10 | 10 | 104 | 11 | 104 | 9 | 9 | 103 | 11 | 105 | 10 |
| 10 | 112 | 12 | 115 | 9 | 10 | 114 | 12 | 113 | 9 | 10 | 113 | 12 | 114 | 9 |
| FINAL SCORE | 112 | – | 115 | FINAL SCORE | FINAL SCORE | 114 | – | 113 | FINAL SCORE | FINAL SCORE | 113 | – | 114 | FINAL SCORE |
| Lost | | | Won | | Won | | | Lost | | Lost | | | Won | |
| Judge: Manuel Oliver Palermo | | | | | Judge: Craig Metcalfe | | | | | Judge: Mike Fitzgerald | | | | |
| Suspensions: none | | | | | Point deductions: none | | | | | Decision: Usyk won via split decision | | | | |

Source: Yahoo! Sports

== Aftermath ==
Usyk broke down in tears in the ring after his victory was announced and dedicated it to his family, his team, and the people of Ukraine. After the fight, Fury commented: "I believe he won a few of the rounds but I won the majority of them … His country's at war, so people are siding with the country at war, but make no mistake, I won that fight … I'll be back. I've got a rematch clause." Fury raised the possibility of a rematch "in October", and eventually declared: "Happy New Year!" Usyk responded to Fury, stating, "If he wants, I'm ready for a rematch." Usyk supposedly suffered a broken jaw from the bout and went to the hospital after his press conference. Although, Usyk did not break his jaw. Fury was given a one-week medical suspension following the fight.

In its next update of the rankings, The Ring returned Usyk to the No.1 spot in the pound-for-pound rankings, which he had previously lost to Terence Crawford on 29 July.

Along with Usyk's team, a few commentators, like TNT Sports' David Haye, felt Usyk was robbed by the referee of a win by technical knockout in the ninth round. Usyk's win made him the first new undisputed heavyweight champion in 24 years. Lennox Lewis held the title for five months after he defeated Evander Holyfield in November 1999. In a post-match analysis, analysts wrote that Usyk's hall of fame case is "beyond cemented" and that he is an all-time great after his win. Two-division undisputed champion Terence Crawford, ESPN's top-ranked pound for pound boxer, declared Usyk a candidate for the No. 1 position. The rematch was scheduled to take place in Riyadh, Saudi Arabia, on 21 December 2024.

=== Main event unofficial scorecards ===
| | Agency | Writer(s) | Scorecard | Winner | Reference |
|---|---|---|---|---|---|
| 1 | The Guardian | Bryan Graham | 116–111 | Usyk | |
| 2 | The Sporting News | Dom Farrell | 114–113 | Usyk | |
| 3 | Indy Sport | Alex Pattle and Jack Rathborn | 115–112 | Usyk | |
| 4 | ESPN | Mike Coppinger | 115–112 | Usyk | |
| 5 | Bad Left Hook | Patrick L. Stumberg | 116–111 | Usyk | |
| 6 | Fight Freaks | Dan Rafael | 115–112 | Usyk | |
Total: Usyk 6, Fury 0

== Financial details ==
The event reportedly sold over 1.5 million pay-per-view buys, mostly in the UK, and this generated over $50 million. The event also made $40 million in advertising and $3 million gate at the arena. However, the revenue failed to cover total expenses, which were estimated at $120 million. At least 20 million people watched the fight through piracy streams. Of those 20 million, approximately 45% were from the mainland Europe and 18% were from the UK. The financial loss from illegal streaming is estimated to be around $120 million.

The total purse is reported to be worth around $150 million (£116 million), with Fury being guaranteed 70% of the purse, or £81.2 million (around $105 million). Usyk reportedly secured $45 million. With the UK tax rate in place for Fury, he will henceforth contribute a minimum of £45 million of his purse to the British government.

== Rematch ==
On 29 May, Turki Alalshikh announced that the rematch was scheduled to take place in Riyadh, Saudi Arabia, on 21 December. Usyk beat Fury once again, the second fight ended in a unanimous decision with all three judges scoring the bout 116–112. The total purse for the rematch was reportedly worth $190–191 million (£150 million).

| Preceded by vs. Francis Ngannou | Tyson Fury's bouts 18 May 2024 | Succeeded by Rematch |
| Preceded by vs. Daniel Dubois | Oleksandr Usyk's bouts 18 May 2024 | Succeeded by Rematch |
Awards
| Preceded by O'Shaquie Foster vs. Eduardo Hernández; Round 11 | The Ring Round of the Year; Round 9; 2024 | Incumbent |
| Previous: Day of Reckoning | The Ring Event of the Year; 2024 | Incumbent |
