= Oleksandr Usyk vs. Daniel Dubois =

Boxing competition

- Date: 26 August 2023
- Venue: Stadion Wrocław, Wrocław, Poland
- Titles on the line: WBA (Super), IBF, WBO, IBO, TBRB, and The Ring unified heavyweight titles

Tale of the tape
Boxer	Oleksandr Usyk	Daniel Dubois
Nickname	The Cat	Dynamite
Hometown	Simferopol, Ukraine	London, England
Pre-fight record	20–0 (13 KO)	19–1 (18 KO)
Age	36 years, 7 months	25 years, 11 months
Height	6 ft 3 in (191 cm)	6 ft 5 in (196 cm)
Weight	220.9 lb (100 kg)	233.2 lb (106 kg)
Style	Southpaw	Orthodox
Recognition	WBA (Super), IBF, WBO, TBRB, The Ring and IBO; Heavyweight Champion; The Ring No. 3 ranked pound-for-pound fighter 2-division world champion	WBA (Regular); Heavyweight Champion; WBO; No. 8 Ranked Heavyweight

Result
- Usyk wins via ninth-round knockout

Oleksandr Usyk vs. Daniel Dubois was a heavyweight professional boxing match between WBA (Super), IBF, WBO, IBO and The Ring heavyweight champion Oleksandr Usyk and WBA (Regular) heavyweight champion Daniel Dubois.

The bout took place on 26 August 2023 at Stadion Wrocław, Wrocław, Poland. Usyk defeated Dubois via knockout in the 9th round.

== Background ==
Dubois became the mandatory challenger to Usyk after he defeated Trevor Bryan On 11 June 2022, by knockout in the fourth round to become the WBA (Regular) heavyweight champion. This was then followed up with a victory over and defence of his WBA (Regular) heavyweight title against Kevin Lerena on 3 December 2022. This set up a mandatory challenge to Usyk for the WBA (Super) heavyweight championship.

On 3 April 2023, the WBA officially ordered the world title consolidation between unified heavyweight champion Usyk and WBA 'regular' titleholder Daniel Dubois (19–1, 18 KOs). Both parties were given a 30-day negotiation period. Earlier reports suggested the fight could take place in London or Manchester in England. Although no date or location had been confirmed, Alex Krassyuk stated the fight could take place in a stadium in Poland.

In May 2023, purse bids were held. Usyk's career-long promoter Krassyuk gained control of the fight with a massive bid of $8,057,000, which was more than the $5,620,050 submitted by Queensberry Promotions. A fight date in August was being eyed. As per the purse splits, Usyk was to take home $6,042,750 (75% of the winning bid) and Dubois was to take a career-high $2,014,250 payday. The fight took place on 26 August at the Stadion Wroclaw in Wrocław, Poland for Usyk's WBA (Super), IBF, WBO, IBO and The Ring titles. The date aligned with Ukraine's Independence Day. An attendance of around 24,000 was expected.

== The fight ==
Usyk retained his titles via ninth-round stoppage, however there was controversy surrounding the events of the fifth round, when Usyk dropped to the canvas following a punch from Dubois that was ruled a low blow by referee Luis Pabon. Accordingly, Usyk was given a maximum of five minutes to recover, but despite declaring he was ready to continue, Pabon urged Usyk to take more time out. Usyk ultimately used three minutes and forty-five seconds before the fight resumed. Usyk forced Dubois to take a knee in the eighth round and again in the ninth round, where he was counted out. According to CompuBox stats, Usyk had outlanded Dubois in every round of the fight, landing 88 of 359 punches thrown (24.5%) to Dubois' 47 of 290 (16.2%). Dubois failed to land double digits in any round of the fight.

Debate subsequently followed regarding the fifth round low blow as many observers felt it should actually have been ruled a legal punch and thus potentially resulted in a KO victory for Dubois. In his post-fight interview, Dubois opined: "I didn’t think that was a low blow. I thought that landed, and I’ve been cheated out of victory tonight.” However, Usyk's promoter Alex Krassyuk argued "The belly button is the line. Anything low of that is a low blow." This argument was echoed by others including boxers Tony Bellew and Liam Smith.

== Aftermath ==
Usyk would agree to an undisputed showdown with Tyson Fury set for 17 February 2024 (later pushed back to 18 May). Usyk would go on to beat Fury and become the first undisputed heavyweight champion in the current four-belt era (WBA-WBC-IBF-WBO) since Lennox Lewis in 1999.

After the defeat, Dubois rebounded with 2 TKO victories in Riyadh, against Jarrell Miller in 23 December and Filip Hrgović on 1 June the following year.

Following Usyk's announcement of vacating his IBF title in June, the belt was contested between Dubois and Anthony Joshua on 21 September at Wembley Stadium. The underdog Dubois would go on to shock the world with a 0:59 KO of Joshua in the 5th round, winning the vacant IBF heavyweight title in the process.

The Usyk vs. Dubois 2 rematch took place on Saturday, 19 July 2025 at Wembley Stadium in London for the undisputed heavyweight championship, where Usyk defended his WBA, WBC, WBO, IBO, and The Ring heavyweight titles, and Dubois defended his IBF heavyweight title in front of 90,000 fans. Usyk would win the rematch via 5th round KO to reclaim the undisputed title.

== Fight card ==
Weight Class		vs.		Method	Round	Time	Notes
Main Card
Heavyweight	Oleksandr Usyk (c)	def.	Daniel Dubois	KO	9 (12)	1:48	^{Note 1}
Super Welterweight	Aadam Hamed	def.	Vojtech Hrdý	TKO	1 (4)	2:09	^{Note 2}
Lightweight	Denys Berinchyk (c)	def.	Anthony Yigit	UD	12		^{Note 3}
Heavyweight	Hamzah Sheeraz (c)	def.	Dmytro Mytrofanov	TKO	2 (12)	0:35	^{Note 4}
Middleweight	Anauel Ngamissengue	def.	Fiodor Czerkaszyn	MD	8
Light heavyweight	Daniel Lapin	def.	Aro Schwartz	TKO	6 (10)	2:25	^{Note 5}
Preliminary Card
Featherweight	Oleksandr Solomennikov	def.	Piotr Gudel	UD	1 (6)	2:41
Super Lightweight	Ziyad Al Maayouf	def.	János Pénzes	UD	6
Super Lightweight	Bryce Mills	def.	Damian Tymosz	UD	6
Welterweight	Vasyl Chebotar	def.	Joel Julio	TKO	6 (8)	1:15
Heavyweight	Lazizbek Mullojonov	def.	Nursultan Amanzholov	TKO	1 (6)	2:13
Middleweight	Rafał Wołczecki	def.	Roberto Arriaza	TKO	3 (8)	2:59
Lightweight	Yaroslav Khartsyz	def.	Konrad Czajkowski	UD	4

^Note 1 For WBA (Super), IBF, WBO, IBO, TBRB, and The Ring World Heavyweight championships
^Note 2 Hamed's professional debut
^Note 3 For WBO International lightweight championship
^Note 4 For WBC Silver Middleweight championship
^Note 5 For vacant IBO Continental Light Heavyweight championship

== Broadcasting ==
Country	Broadcaster
Worldwide (unsold markets)	Triller TV
Australia	Main Event
Canada	TSN+
Poland	Megogo
Ukraine	Megogo
United Kingdom	TNT Sports Box Office
United States	ESPN+

Preceded by vs. Anthony Joshua II	Oleksandr Usyk's bouts 26 August 2023	Succeeded by vs. Tyson Fury
Preceded by vs. Kevin Lerena	Daniel Dubois's bouts 26 August 2023	Succeeded by vs. Jarrell Miller
