= Troy Jones =

English boxer (born 1998)

Personal information
- Born: 26 June 1998 (age 28) Birmingham, West Midlands, England
- Weight: Light-heavyweight

Boxing career
- Stance: Orthodox

Boxing record
- Total fights: 15
- Wins: 13
- Win by KO: 6
- Losses: 2

Troy Jones (born 26 June 1998) is an English professional boxer. He is a former English light-heavyweight champion.

== Career ==
Having started boxing aged seven and spending his amateur career fighting out of Solihull ABC, Jones made his professional debut on 16 October 2021, defeating Daniel Borisov on points in a four-round contest in Birmingham.

Unbeaten in his first 10 pro-fights, he faced Leon Willings for the vacant English light-heavyweight title at the Eastside Rooms in Birmingham on 17 August 2024. Jones won by unanimous decision.

He made a successful first defense of his title against Michael Stephenson at Resorts World Arena in Birmingham on 30 November 2024, winning via unanimous decision despite having a point deducted for illegal use of the shoulder.

Jones faced Ezra Taylor for the vacant WBA Continental Gold light-heavyweight title at Nottingham Arena on 10 May 2025. He lost via unanimous decision.

He was scheduled to challenge IBF Intercontinental and WBO International light-heavyweight champion Daniel Lapin at Co-op Live Arena in Manchester on 1 November 2025. However, Lapin withdrew from the fight due to injury with Liam Cameron stepping in as Jones' new opponent. Jones lost by unanimous decision.
