= Bradley Rea =

English boxer (born 1998)

Personal information
- Nickname: The Sting
- Born: 16 February 1998 (age 28) Stretford, Greater Manchester, England
- Weight: Light heavyweight; Middleweight

Boxing career
- Stance: Orthodox

Boxing record
- Total fights: 25
- Wins: 23
- Win by KO: 12
- Losses: 2

Bradley Rea (born 16 February 1998) is an English professional boxer. He held the European light-heavyweight title from June 2025 to November 2025.

== Career ==
Having turned professional in 2018, Rea was unbeaten in his first 14 fights when he challenged English middleweight champion Tyler Denny at Manchester Arena on 12 November 2022, suffering his first loss via unanimous decision.

After putting together a run of six successive wins, he faced Shakan Pitters for the vacant European light-heavyweight title at Connexin Live Arena in Hull on 28 June 2025. Rea won the contest by unanimous decision.

On 1 August 2025, it was announced that Rea had signed with Frank Warren's Queensbury Promotions.

He made the first defense of his title against Lyndon Arthur at Co-op Live Arena in Manchester on 1 November 2025. Rea knocked his opponent to the canvas in the second round, but eventually lost via majority decision with two of the ringside judges scoring the bout 115–113 and 115–112 respectively for Arthur, while the third had it a 114–114 draw.

Rea returned to Co-op Live Arena in Manchester to face Liam Cameron for the vacant WBA Inter-Continental light-heavyweight title on 9 May 2026. He floored his opponent twice in the fourth round with the referee stepping in to halt the fight after the second knockdown, handing him the win by technical knockout.

He made the first defense of his title against Ezra Taylor at AO Arena in Manchester on 7 November 2026. Rea sent his opponent to the canvas in the second round and, although he got back to his feet and was allowed to continue, the referee stopped the contest a few seconds later as Taylor came under another heavy barrage of unanswered punches.

== Personal life ==
Rea was educated at St Matthew's Primary School and Wellacre High School, in Flixton, Greater Manchester.

== Professional boxing record ==
25 fights	23 wins	2 losses
By knockout	12	0
By decision	11	2

No.	Result	Record	Opponent	Type	Round, time	Date	Location	Notes
25	Win	23–2	Ezra Taylor	TKO	2 (10), 0:58	7 Nov 2026	Manchester Arena, Manchester, England	Retained WBA Inter-Continental light-heavyweight title
24	Win	22–2	Liam Cameron	TKO	4 (10), 1:35	9 May 2026	Co-op Live, Manchester, England	Won WBA Inter-Continental light-heavyweight title
23	Loss	21–2	Lyndon Arthur	MD	12	1 Nov 2025	Co-op Live, Manchester, England	Lost European light-heavyweight title
22	Win	21–1	Shakan Pitters	UD	12	28 Jun 2025	Connexin Live Arena, Hull, England	Won vacant European light-heavyweight title
21	Win	20–1	Adam Hepple	KO	3 (10), 1:25	23 Nov 2024	The Hideout, Farnworth, England	
20	Win	19–1	Ryan Labourn	TKO	2 (6), 1:35	7 Sep 2024	Winter Gardens, Blackpool, England	
19	Win	18–1	Ondrej Budera	TKO	1 (4), 1:35	13 Jul 2024	John Charles Centre For Sport, Leeds, England	
18	Win	17–1	Patryk Polasik	TKO	1 (6), 2:44	9 Mar 2024	Winter Gardens, Blackpool, England	
17	Win	16–1	Adam Cieslak	KO	2 (6)	2 Dec 2023	Winter Gardens, Blackpool, England	
16	Win	15–1	Serhii Ksendzov	PTS	6	6 Oct 2023	Grand Central Hall, Liverpool, England	
15	Loss	14–1	Tyler Denny	UD	10	12 Nov 2022	Manchester Arena, Manchester, England	For English middleweight title
14	Win	14–0	Angel Petkov Emilov	PTS	6	2 Jul 2022	City Hall, Hull, England	
13	Win	13–0	Lukas Ndafoluma	PTS	8	2 Apr 2022	Newcastle Arena, Newcastle, England	
12	Win	12–0	Craig McCarthy	TKO	1 (8), 1:53	19 Feb 2022	Manchester Arena, Manchester, England	
11	Win	11–0	Jez Smith	PTS	8	16 Oct 2021	Newcastle Arena, Newcastle, England	
10	Win	10–0	Lee Cutler	TKO	1 (8), 2:03	20 Mar 2021	Wembley Arena, London, England	
9	Win	9–0	Pavol Garaj	PTS	4	7 Mar 2020	Manchester Arena, Manchester, England	
8	Win	8–0	Darryl Sharp	PTS	6	7 Dec 2019	Bolton Whites Hotel (De Vere Whites), Bolton, England	
7	Win	7–0	Paul Allison	RTD	2 (6), 3:00	28 Sep 2019	Bolton Whites Hotel (De Vere Whites), Bolton, England	
6	Win	6–0	Alistair Warren	TKO	1 (6), 1:56	19 Jul 2019	Planet Ice, Altrincham, England	
5	Win	5–0	Genadij Krajevskij	TKO	3 (6), 1:08	4 May 2019	Victoria Warehouse, Trafford Road, Manchester, England	
4	Win	4–0	Victor Edagha	PTS	4	9 Mar 2019	Bolton Whites Hotel (De Vere Whites), Bolton, England	
3	Win	3–0	Geraint Goodridge	PTS	4	16 Dec 2018	Victoria Warehouse, Trafford Road, Manchester, England	
2	Win	2–0	Vaidas Balciauskas	PTS	4	17 Nov 2018	Victoria Warehouse, Trafford Road, Manchester, England	
1	Win	1–0	Jordan Grannum	PTS	4	15 Sep 2018	Victoria Warehouse, Trafford Road, Manchester, England	
