= Anthony Joshua vs. Otto Wallin =

Professional boxing match

Day of Reckoning
- Date: 23 December 2023
- Venue: Kingdom Arena, Riyadh, Saudi Arabia

Tale of the tape
Boxer	Anthony Joshua	Otto Wallin
Nickname	"AJ"	"All In"
Hometown	Watford, Hertfordshire, UK	Sundsvall, Västernorrland, Sweden
Pre-fight record	26–3 (23 KO)	26–2 (1) (14 KO)
Age	34 years, 2 months	33 years, 1 month
Height	6 ft 6 in (198 cm)	6 ft 5 1/2 in (197 cm)
Weight	251 lb (114 kg)	238.6 lb (108 kg)
Style	Orthodox	Southpaw
Recognition	WBO; No. 1 Ranked Heavyweight; WBC/The Ring; No. 2 Ranked Heavyweight; WBA/IBF/TBRB; No. 3 Ranked Heavyweight; Former 2 time unified heavyweight champion	IBF; No. 2 Ranked Heavyweight; WBC; No. 9 Ranked Heavyweight; WBO; No. 12 Ranked Heavyweight; TBRB; No. 4 Ranked Heavyweight; The Ring; No. 10 Ranked Heavyweight; WBA inter-continental heavyweight champion

Result
- Joshua wins by corner retirement in 6 rounds

The Day of Reckoning, was the billing of a professional boxing event. While the fight card consists of eight fights, two heavyweight fights serve as co-main events. The first, Anthony Joshua vs. Otto Wallin was contested between English former WBA (Super), IBF, WBO, and IBO heavyweight champion Anthony Joshua and Swedish WBA inter-continental heavyweight champion Otto Wallin. The second, Deontay Wilder vs. Joseph Parker, was contested between American former WBC heavyweight champion Deontay Wilder and New Zealand IBF and WBO inter-continental heavyweight champion Joseph Parker.

The event took place on 23 December 2023 at the Kingdom Arena in Riyadh, Saudi Arabia.

== Background and build up ==
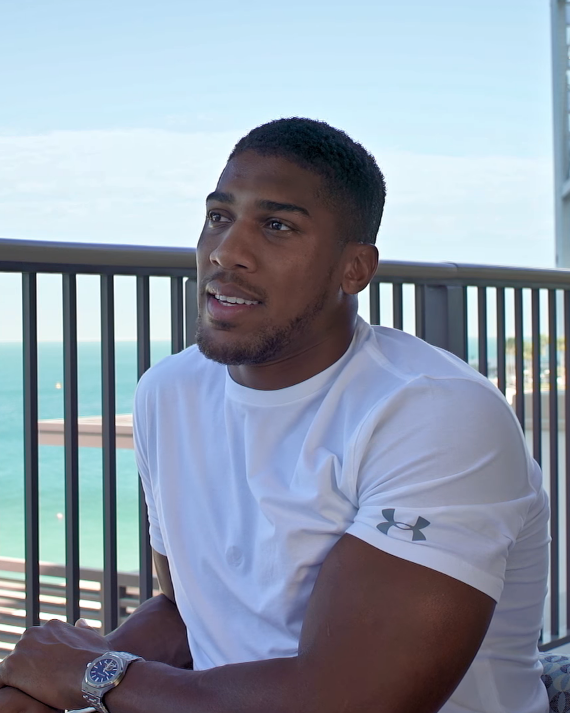
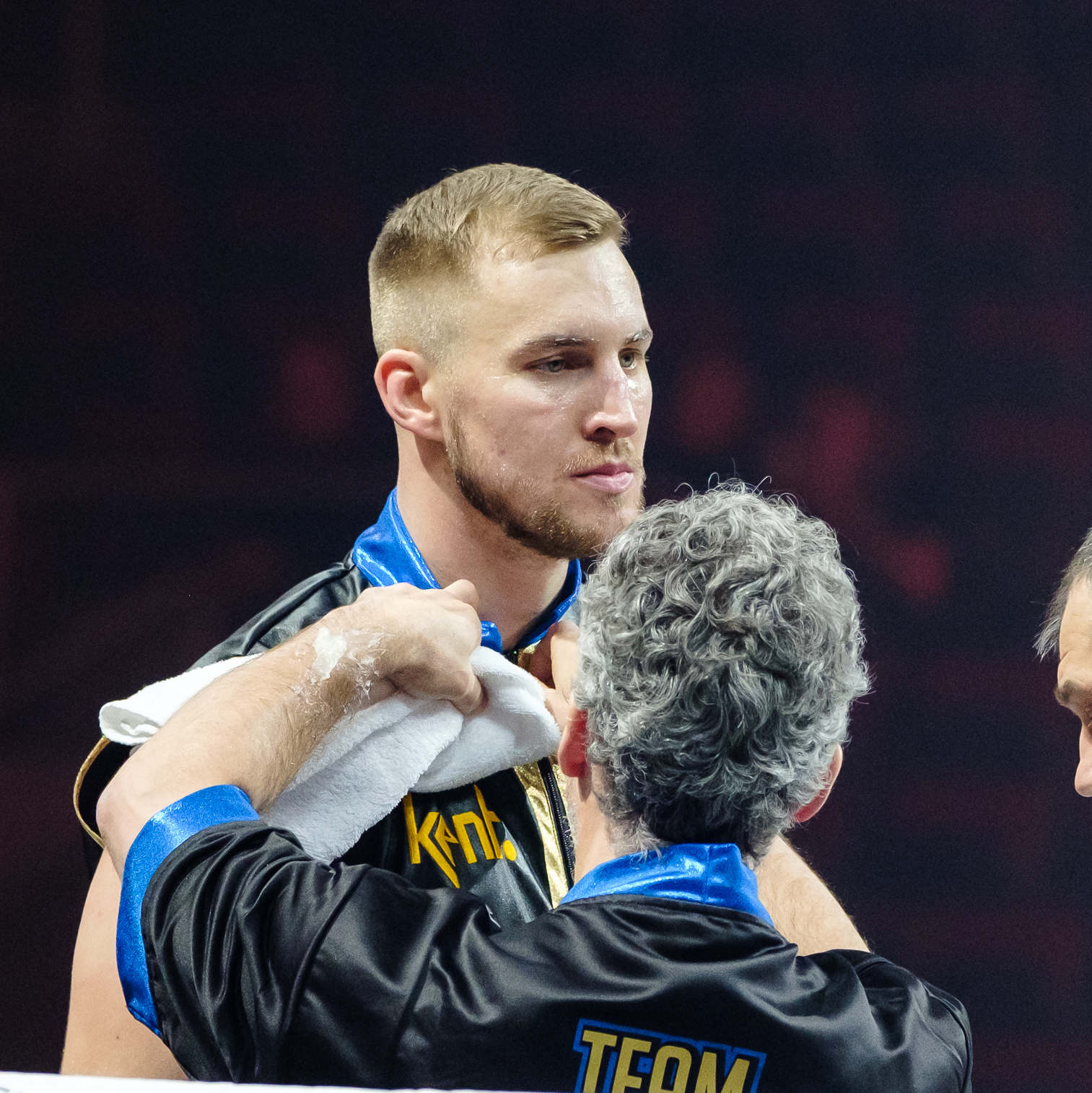
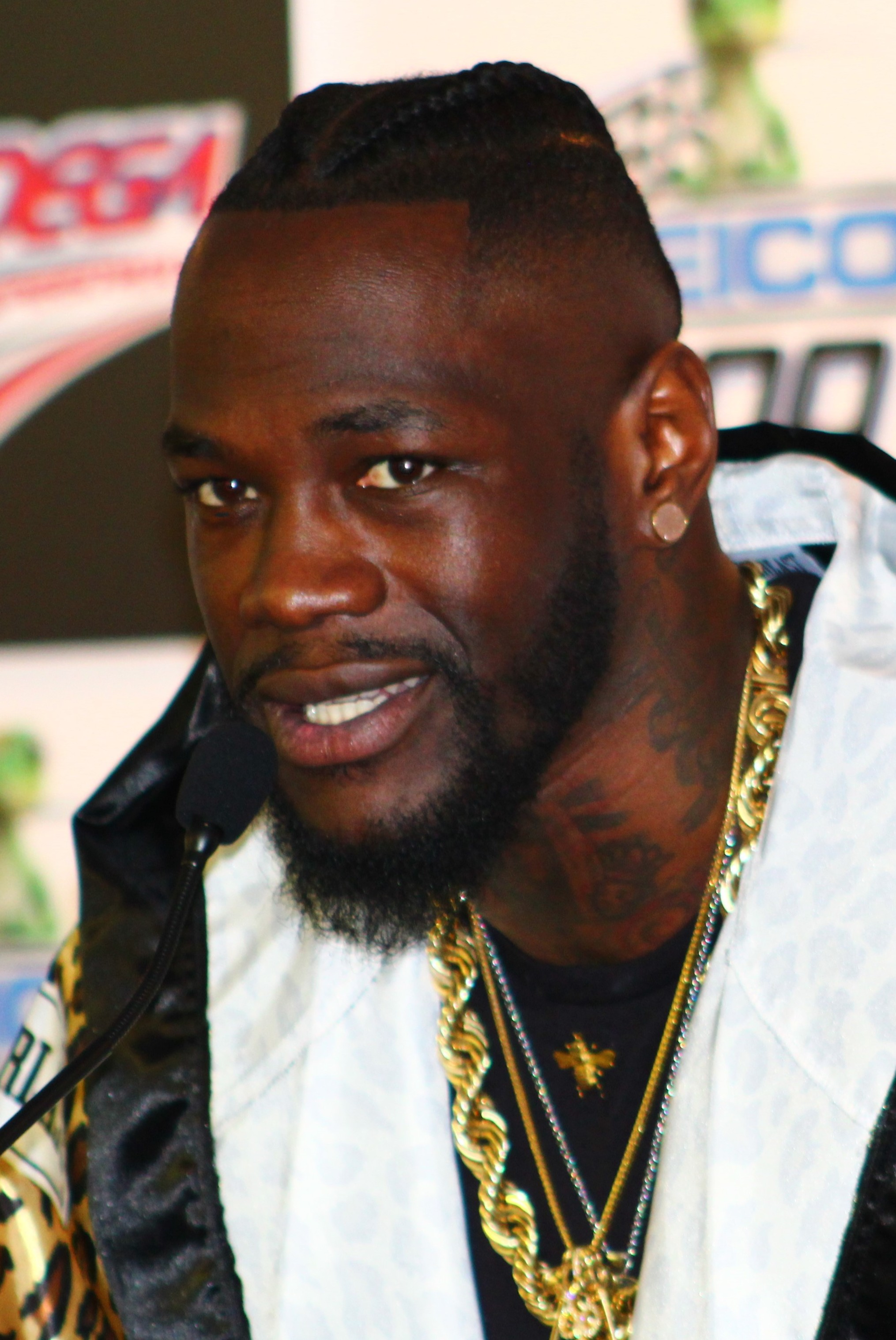
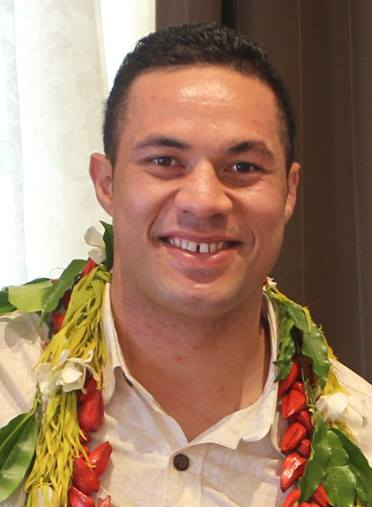
Anthony Joshua (top left), Otto Wallin (top right), Deontay Wilder (bottom left) and Joseph Parker (bottom right)

In October 2023, it was reported that a bout between Tyson Fury and Oleksandr Usyk was being targeted for 23 December in Saudi Arabia with Anthony Joshua and Deontay Wilder serving as the co-feature.

On 25 October, it was announced that Fury and Uysk was signed for 23 December. On 27 October, Fury fought and defeated former UFC Heavyweight Champion Francis Ngannou which resulted in the bout with Usyk to be postponed due to the injuries Fury sustained.

On 11 November, reports began to state that Joshua and Wilder could be fighting on the same card on 23 December. On 15 November, it was officially announced that Joshua would face Otto Wallin and Wilder would face Joseph Parker on 23 December in Riyadh with a launch press conference in London.

The bill featured the number one ranked heavyweight contenders from all four main boxing sanctioning bodies Deontay Wilder (WBC/WBA), Filip Hrgović (IBF) and Anthony Joshua (WBO).

== The fights ==
=== Undercard ===
Former world title challenger Daniel Dubois (WBC:14th WBA:7th IBF/WBO:8th) scored a dramatic stoppage of previously undefeated Jarrell Miller (WBA:6th) with only 10 seconds left in the final round.

=== Bivol vs Arthur ===
In the second of two world title bout on the card, WBA Light Heavyweight Champion Dmitry Bivol returned from a 14 month layoff to win a wide points victory over IBO titleholder (and WBA No. 8 ranked) Lyndon Arthur.

Preceded by vs. Gilberto Ramírez	Dmitry Bivol's bouts 23 December 2023	Succeeded by vs. Malik Zinad
Preceded by vs. Braian Nahuel Suarez	Lyndon Arthur's bouts 23 December 2023	Succeeded by vs. Liam Cameron

=== Wilder vs Parker ===
Day of Reckoning: Deontay Wilder vs. Joseph Parker
- Title(s) on the line: WBO Inter-Continental and vacant WBC International heavyweight titles

Tale of the tape
Boxer	Deontay Wilder	Joseph Parker
Nickname	"The Bronze Bomber"	"Lupesoliai La'auliolemalietoa"
Hometown	Tuscaloosa, Alabama, U.S.	Auckland, Auckland Region, New Zealand
Pre-fight record	43–2–1 (42 KO)	33–3 (23 KOs)
Age	38 years, 2 months	31 years, 11 months
Height	6 ft 7 in (201 cm)	6 ft 4 in (193 cm)
Weight	214 lb (97 kg)	241 1/4 lb (109 kg)
Style	Orthodox	Orthodox
Recognition	WBC/WBA; No. 1 Ranked Heavyweight; WBO; No. 9 Ranked Heavyweight; The Ring; No. 3 Ranked Heavyweight; Former WBC heavyweight champion	WBO; No. 3 Ranked Heavyweight; IBF; No. 4 Ranked Heavyweight; WBC; No. 9 Ranked Heavyweight; The Ring; No. 5 Ranked Heavyweight; WBO Inter-Continental heavyweight champion Former WBO heavyweight champion

Result
- Parker wins by unanimous decision in 12 rounds

The penultimate bout on the card saw former world champions Deontay Wilder and Joseph Parker faceoff for the WBO Inter-Continental and vacant WBC International heavyweight titles

Wilder entered the ring having boxed just three minutes in the past two years, whereas Parker had fought three times already in 2023. Despite this the bookmakers had Wilder as the 5/1 on favourite to win, with Parker the 9/2 underdog.

==== The fight ====
Parker came forward with bursts and was generally the busier and more accurate boxer. He made use of looping right hands over the top to make Wilder reluctant to throw his trademark reckless right hand. At the end of 8th round an overhand right from Parker put Wilder in trouble before he was saved by the bell. Wilder failed to trouble Parker throughout the rest of the bout and after 12 rounds, judges scored it 118–111, 118–110, and 120–108 all for Parker.

According to CompuBox Parker out landed Wilder, landing with 89 of 255 punches thrown (34.9% connect rate) to just 39 of 204 (19.1% connect rate) from Wilder.

==== Aftermath ====
In his post fight interview Parker said "Dangerous fight, a tough fight but we trained very hard for this. People had other plans, but this is God's plan. Today we got the win and Merry Christmas to us! Deontay's got a new coach and maybe he's applying the new things he's working on, but maybe inactivity played a part."

Speaking to TNT Sports in the aftermath Eddie Hearn said "Wilder had no idea, no clue. He lost every round. He had his hand up telling the referees he won the fight. He's not right. That's the reality. It was the most one-sided heavyweight fight I've ever seen. It's ruined our plans. We've got to go let Anthony Joshua know Wilder lost to Parker."

Wilder for his part praised Parker saying "He did a great job avoiding a lot of my punches. We make no excuses tonight. It was a good fight, and we move on to the next thing."

Preceded by vs. Robert Helenius	Deontay Wilder' bouts 23 December 2023	Succeeded by vs. Zhilei Zhang
Preceded by vs. Simon Kean	Joseph Parker's bouts 23 December 2023	Succeeded by vs. Zhilei Zhang

=== Joshua vs Wallin ===
Joshua put on a dominant performance in his first bout with new trainer Ben Davison. After multiple rounds of calculated pressure punching, Joshua hurt Wallin with a hard left hook in the 5th. After Joshua dominated the rest of the round, causing extensive damage to Wallin's face, the Swede's corner pulled him out in-between rounds.

== Aftermath ==
After the event, the promoters revealed contracts had previously been signed for Wilder and Joshua to fight next if they both won their respective fights. However, due to Wilder's defeat, these plans were cancelled. Instead, Joshua faced former UFC heavyweight champion Francis Ngannou in Riyadh on March 8th.

== Fight card ==
Confirmed bouts:

Weight class		vs		Method	Round	Time	Notes
Main Card (PPV)
Heavyweight	Anthony Joshua	def.	Otto Wallin	RTD	5 (12)	3:00
Heavyweight	Joseph Parker (c)	def.	Deontay Wilder	UD	12		^{Note 1}
Light heavyweight	Dmitry Bivol (c)	def.	Lyndon Arthur (c)	UD	12		^{Note 2}
Heavyweight	Daniel Dubois	def.	Jarrell Miller	TKO	10 (10)	2:52
Heavyweight	Agit Kabayel	def.	Arslanbek Makhmudov	TKO	4 (10)	2:03
Cruiserweight	Jai Opetaia (c)	def.	Ellis Zorro	KO	1 (12)	2:56	^{Note 2}
Heavyweight	Filip Hrgović	def.	Mark de Mori	TKO	1 (10)	1:46
Heavyweight	Frank Sánchez	def.	Junior Fa	TKO	7 (10)	2:42

^Note 1 For WBO Inter-Continental and vacant WBC International heavyweight titles
^Note 2 For WBA (Super) and IBO light-heavyweight titles
^Note 3 For The Ring cruiserweight title

== Broadcasting ==
The event was available on PPV, via DAZN globally (including UK and Ireland).

In the UK and Ireland, the PPV was also available on TNT Sports Box Office.

Preceded by vs. Robert Helenius	Anthony Joshua' bouts 23 December 2023	Succeeded by vs. Francis Ngannou
Preceded by vs. Murat Gassiev	Otto Wallin's bouts 23 December 2023	Succeeded by vs. Onoriode Ehwarieme
Awards
Previous: Katie Taylor vs. Amanda Serrano	The Ring Event of the Year; 2023	Next: Tyson Fury vs. Oleksandr Usyk
