= Lyndon Arthur =

English boxer (born 1991)

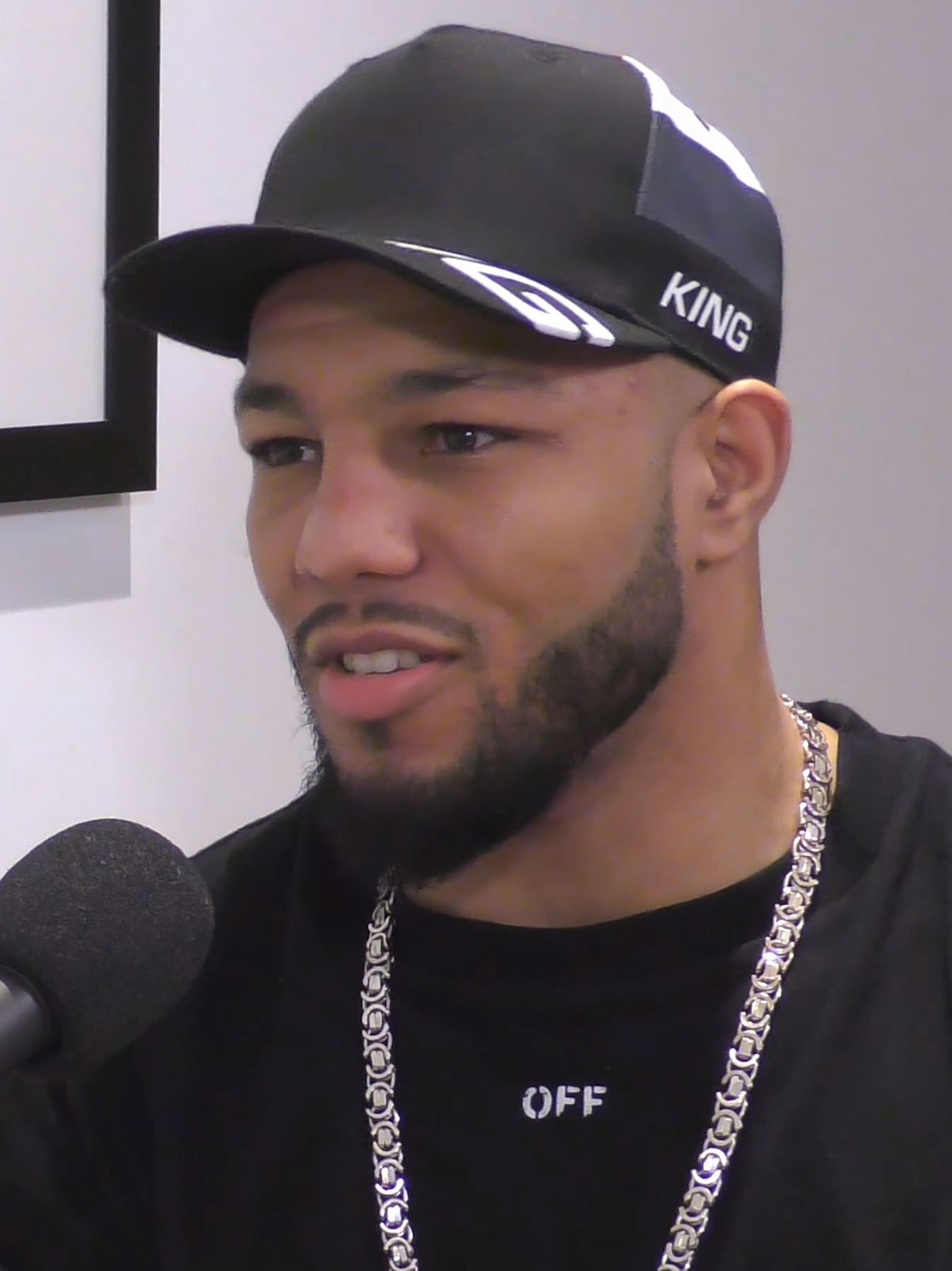
- Arthur in 2021

Personal information
- Nickname: King Arthur
- Born: 13 June 1991 (age 35) Manchester, England
- Height: 6 ft 2 in (188 cm)
- Weight: Light-heavyweight

Boxing career
- Stance: Orthodox

Boxing record
- Total fights: 29
- Wins: 25
- Win by KO: 16
- Losses: 4
Medal record
Men's amateur boxing
Representing England
English National Championships
| Silver medal – second place | 2014 Liverpool | Light-heavyweight |
| Silver medal – second place | 2016 Liverpool | Light-heavyweight |

Lyndon Arthur (born 13 June 1991) is a British professional boxer. He held the International Boxing Organization (IBO) light-heavyweight title in 2023. At regional level, he has held multiple light-heavyweight championships, including the Commonwealth title from 2019 to 2021, and has held the European title since 2025.

== Amateur career ==
As an amateur, Arthur had around 50 bouts and fought out of Collyhurst & Moston ABC. He competed in multiple national championships, including the 2012-13 ABA National Development Championships at 86 kg, losing out to Jermaine Kelly in the final. At 81 kg, he won the 2013-14 ABA Senior Development Championships and reached the finals of the 2014 and 2016 ABA Elite Championships, losing out to Joshua Buatsi and Tom Whittaker-Hart respectively. In 2016 he also fought in the World Series of Boxing for the British Lionhearts.

== Professional career ==
Arthur made his professional debut on 24 September 2016 at the Manchester Arena, Manchester, scoring a four-round points decision victory over Andy Neylon.

On 4 November 2017, he gained a disqualification (DQ) win over Tayar Mehmed at the Bowlers Exhibition Centre in Manchester. After being repeatedly warned for spitting out his gum-shield, referee Darren Sarginson disqualified Mehmed in the fifth-round.

In his sixteenth fight, with a record of 15–0 (12 KO), he faced Emmanuel Anim for the vacant Commonwealth light-heavyweight title on 12 October 2019, at the First Direct Arena, Leeds. In a fight which saw Arthur go beyond six rounds for the first time in his professional career, he dropped his opponent in the fourth round en route to a unanimous decision victory, with the judges' scorecards reading 117–111, 117–110 and 115–113.

Arthur was scheduled to defend his title against Anthony Yarde on 11 April 2020, however due to the COVID-19 pandemic, the fight was rescheduled to 5 December 2020.

On 5 December 2020, Arthur defeated Yarde via Split Decision to retain his Commonwealth light- heavyweight title and win the vacant WBO Inter-Continental light-heavyweight title.

On 4 December 2021, Yarde defeated Arthur in the rematch via knockout in the fourth round. A third fight between the two took place on the undercard of Chris Eubank Jr vs. Conor Benn at the Tottenham Hotspur Stadium on 26 April 2025, with Yarde winning by unanimous decision.

Arthur challenged European light-heavyweight champion Bradley Rea at Co-op Live Arena in Manchester on 1 November 2025. He was knocked to the canvas in the second round, but recovered to eventually win via majority decision with two of the ringside judges scoring the bout 115–113 and 115–112 respectively for Arthur, while the third had it a 114–114 draw.

He fought Lewis Edmondson at St Mary's Stadium in Southampton on 20 June 2026. Arthur lost by unanimous decision.

== Personal life ==
Arthur comes from a fighting family, being a cousin of Commonwealth super-featherweight champion Zelfa Barrett and former British, European and world title challenger Pat Barrett, who is also his trainer.

== Professional boxing record ==
| 29 fights | 25 wins | 4 losses |
|---|---|---|
| By knockout | 16 | 1 |
| By decision | 8 | 3 |
| By disqualification | 1 | 0 |

| No. | Result | Record | Opponent | Type | Round, time | Date | Location | Notes |
|---|---|---|---|---|---|---|---|---|
| 29 | Loss | 25–4 | Lewis Edmondson | UD | 10 | 20 Jun 2026 | St Mary's Stadium, Southampton, England | For vacant WBA International light-heavyweight title |
| 28 | Win | 25–3 | Bradley Rea | MD | 12 | 1 Nov 2025 | Co-op Live, Manchester, England | Won vacant European light-heavyweight title |
| 27 | Loss | 24–3 | Anthony Yarde | UD | 12 | 26 Apr 2025 | Tottenham Hotspur Stadium, London, England | |
| 26 | Win | 24–2 | Liam Cameron | SD | 10 | 21 Jun 2024 | Bolton Whites Hotel, Bolton, England | Won vacant WBA Inter-Continental light-heavyweight title |
| 25 | Loss | 23–2 | Dmitry Bivol | UD | 12 | 23 Dec 2023 | Kingdom Arena, Riyadh, Saudi Arabia | Lost IBO light heavyweight title; For WBA (super) light-heavyweight title |
| 24 | Win | 23–1 | Braian Nahuel Suarez | KO | 10 (12), 2:55 | 1 Sep 2023 | Bolton Whites Hotel, Bolton, England | Won vacant IBO light-heavyweight title |
| 23 | Win | 22–1 | Boris Crighton | UD | 10 | 24 Mar 2023 | Bolton Whites Hotel, Bolton, England | |
| 22 | Win | 21–1 | Joel Mcintyre | TKO | 2 (10), 1:46 | 2 Dec 2022 | Utilita Arena, Newcastle, England | |
| 21 | Win | 20–1 | Walter Gabriel Sequeira | TKO | 6 (8), 2:24 | 17 Sep 2022 | Bolton Whites Hotel, Bolton, England | |
| 20 | Loss | 19–1 | Anthony Yarde | KO | 4 (12), 1:27 | 4 Dec 2021 | Copper Box Arena, London, England | Lost Commonwealth and WBO Inter-Continental light-heavyweight titles |
| 19 | Win | 19–0 | Davide Faraci | TKO | 9 (10), 2:50 | 10 Jul 2021 | Royal Albert Hall, London, England | Retained WBO Inter-Continental light-heavyweight title |
| 18 | Win | 18–0 | Anthony Yarde | SD | 12 | 5 Dec 2020 | Church House, London, England | Retained Commonwealth light-heavyweight title; Won vacant WBO Inter-Continental light-heavyweight title |
| 17 | Win | 17–0 | Dec Spelman | UD | 12 | 31 Jul 2020 | BT Sport Studio, London, England | Retained Commonwealth light-heavyweight title |
| 16 | Win | 16–0 | Emmanuel Anim | UD | 12 | 12 Oct 2019 | First Direct Arena, Leeds, England | Won vacant Commonwealth light-heavyweight title |
| 15 | Win | 15–0 | Andrzej Soldra | TKO | 1 (8), 2:25 | 15 Jun 2019 | First Direct Arena, Leeds, England | |
| 14 | Win | 14–0 | Gonzalo Romero | TKO | 1 (8), 3:00 | 15 Mar 2019 | Middleton Arena, Middleton, England | |
| 13 | Win | 13–0 | Emmanuel Feuzeu | TKO | 4 (6) | 22 Dec 2018 | Manchester Arena, Manchester, England | |
| 12 | Win | 12–0 | Adam Williams | TKO | 1 (6), 2:17 | 15 Sep 2018 | Victoria Warehouse, Manchester, England | |
| 11 | Win | 11–0 | Charles Adamu | PTS | 6 | 9 Jun 2018 | Manchester Arena, Manchester, England | |
| 10 | Win | 10–0 | Norbert Szekeres | TKO | 2 (6), 0:33 | 5 May 2018 | Victoria Warehouse, Manchester, England | |
| 9 | Win | 9–0 | Tayar Mehmed | DQ | 5 (6), 3:00 | 4 Nov 2017 | Bowlers Exhibition Centre, Manchester, England | Mehmed disqualified for repeatedly spitting out gum-shield |
| 8 | Win | 8–0 | Josef Obeslo | TKO | 1 (6), 1:30 | 23 Sep 2017 | Manchester Arena, Manchester, England | |
| 7 | Win | 7–0 | Istvan Orsos | KO | 2 (6), 2:08 | 29 Jun 2017 | Bowlers Exhibition Centre, Manchester, England | |
| 6 | Win | 6–0 | Remigijus Ziausys | TKO | 3 (4), 3:00 | 27 May 2017 | Middleton Arena, Middleton, England | |
| 5 | Win | 5–0 | Toni Bilic | TKO | 4 (4), 1:20 | 24 Mar 2017 | Bowlers Exhibition Centre, Manchester, England | |
| 4 | Win | 4–0 | Tsvetozar Iliev | TKO | 1 (4), 1:18 | 24 Feb 2017 | Middleton Arena, Middleton, England | |
| 3 | Win | 3–0 | Elvis Dube | KO | 2 (4), 1:16 | 17 Dec 2016 | Newcastle Racecourse, Newcastle, England | |
| 2 | Win | 2–0 | Mitch Mitchell | TKO | 1 (4), 2:25 | 5 Nov 2016 | Middleton Arena, Middleton, England | |
| 1 | Win | 1–0 | Andy Neylon | PTS | 4 | 24 Sep 2016 | Manchester Arena, Manchester, England | |

Sporting positions
Regional boxing titles
| Preceded by Callum Johnson | Commonwealth light-heavyweight champion 12 Oct 2019 – present | Incumbent |
| Preceded by Eleider Álvarez | WBO Inter-Continental light-heavyweight champion 5 Dec 2020 – present | Incumbent |
