= Karol Welter =

Polish boxer (born 1995)

Personal information
- Born: September 29, 1995 (age 31) Legnica, Poland
- Height: 5 ft 11 in (180 cm)
- Weight: Middleweight

Boxing career
- Reach: 74 in (188 cm)
- Stance: Orthodox

Boxing record
- Total fights: 23
- Wins: 22
- Win by KO: 10
- Losses: 1

Karol Welter is a Polish professional boxer.

== Professional career ==
Welter made his professional debut on 20 January 2018 where he beat David Schwierz via majority decision (MD).

His first title match came on 3 September 2021 where he fought against Przemysław Gorgoń for the Republic of Poland Super Middleweight title. This would be his first career loss after losing via split decision (SD).

His second chance for a title came on 15 April 2023 where he faced off against Stanisław Gibadlo for the vacant Republic of Poland middleweight title. Welter won the fight via unanimous decision (UD).

He faced Misto Abdulaev on November 29, 2025, for the vacant WBA Baltic and Republic of Poland International middleweight titles. Welter won the fight via a fourth-round TKO.

His first defense of both titles came on March 6, 2026, against Evander Castillo. Welter won the fight via a third-round knockout.

== Professional boxing record ==
23 fights	22 wins	1 loss
By knockout	10	0
By decision	12	1

No.	Result	Record	Opponent	Type	Round, time	Date	Location	Notes
23	Win	22–1	Stephen Danyo	TKO	3 (10), 1:29	17 Oct 2026	Hala Sportowa im. Andrzeja Grubby, Międzyzdroje, Poland	Retained WBA Baltic and Republic of Poland International middleweight titles
22	Win	21–1	Evander Castillo	KO	3 (10), 0:44	6 Mar 2026	Hotel Terminal, Wrocław, Poland	Retained WBA Baltic and Republic of Poland International middleweight titles
21	Win	20–1	Misto Abdulaev	TKO	4 (10), 0:56	29 Nov 2025	KGHM Arena Ślęza Wrocław, Wrocław, Poland	Won vacant WBA Baltic and Republic of Poland International middleweight titles
20	Win	19–1	Maksim Hardzeika	TKO	9 (10), 2:05	27 Sep 2025	Hala Widowiskowo-Sportowa, Ziębice, Poland	
19	Win	18–1	Alcorac Caballero	KO	5 (10), 0:21	1 Mar 2025	Hala Widowiskowo-Sportowa, ul. Lotnicza 52, Legnica, Poland	
18	Win	17–1	Ernesto España	RTD	3 (10), 3:00	14 Dec 2024	Hala Widowiskowo-Sportowa, Ziębice, Poland	
17	Win	16–1	Andrew Robinson	UD	10	22 Mar 2024	Hala Widowiskowo-Sportowa, ul. Lotnicza 52, Legnica, Poland	
16	Win	15–1	Vasyl Hrebinnyk	TKO	4 (6), 2:39	27 Oct 2023	Hala Widowiskowo-Sportowa, ul. Lotnicza 52, Legnica, Poland	
15	Win	14–1	Kristaps Bulmeistars	UD	10	8 Jul 2023	Hotel Terminal, Wrocław, Poland	
14	Win	13–1	Stanisław Gibadlo	UD	10	15 Apr 2023	PGE Turów Arena, Zgorzelec, Poland	Won vacant Republic of Poland middleweight title
13	Win	12–1	Yaniel Evander Rivera	UD	8	1 Oct 2022	Regionalne Centrum Turystyki i Sportu, Karlino, Poland	
12	Win	11–1	Emmanuel Feuzeu	UD	6	20 May 2022	Hala Zespołu Szkół, Środa Wielkopolska, Poland	
11	Win	10–1	Patryk Szymański	TKO	7 (8), 1:28	11 Mar 2022	Obiek Rekreacyjno Sportowy Rondo, Konin, Poland	
10	Win	9–1	Damian Mielewczyk	UD	8	29 Oct 2021	Hala MCKiS, Jaworzno, Poland	
9	Loss	8–1	Przemysław Gorgoń	SD	10	3 Sep 2021	Lodowisko BOSiR, Białystok, Poland	For Republic of Poland super middleweight title
8	Win	8–0	Bartosz Głowacki	MD	6	26 Jun 2021	Kompleks Rekreacyjno, Opole, Poland	
7	Win	7–0	Damian Stanisławski	UD	6	9 Apr 2021	Klub Explosion, Warsaw, Poland	
6	Win	6–0	Jakub Bahnik	TKO	4 (6), 1:30	27 Nov 2020	Stegu Arena, Opole, Poland	
5	Win	5–0	Łukasz Rafalko	SD	4	5 Sep 2020	Lodowisko BOSiR, Białystok, Poland	
4	Win	4–0	Patryk Nowak	TKO	2 (4), 2:00	24 Jul 2020	Hala Widowiskowo-Sportowa Złotowianka, Złotów, Poland	
3	Win	3–0	Issam Faiz	UD	4	28 Sep 2019	PGE Turów Arena, Zgorzelec, Poland	
2	Win	2–0	Omar Jatta	UD	4	1 Dec 2018	PGE Turów Arena, Zgorzelec, Poland	
1	Win	1–0	David Schwierz	UD	4	20 Jan 2018	Empore, Buchholz in der Nordheide, Germany	
