= Maksim Hardzeika =

Belarusian boxer (born 1989)

Personal information
- Native name: Максім Гардзейка
- Born: 25 September 1989 (age 37) Grodno, Belarus
- Height: 5 ft 7 in (170 cm)
- Weight: Middleweight

Boxing career
- Reach: 68 in (173 cm)
- Stance: Orthodox

Boxing record
- Total fights: 17
- Wins: 13
- Win by KO: 5
- Losses: 4
- No contests: 0

Maksim Hardzeika (Belarusian: Максім Гардзейка) (born 25 September 1989) is a Belarusian professional boxer.

== Professional career ==
=== 2017 ===
Hardzeika made his professional debut on September 9, 2017, against Matus Samaj. Hardzeika won the fight via a first-round TKO.

=== 2018 ===
His next fight came on February 10, 2018, against Alexander Benidze. Hardzeika won the fight via Unanimous Decision.

He returned three months later on May 12 against Daniel Przewieślik. Hardzeika won the fight via Unanimous Decision.

He returned a month later on June 2 against Tomasz Goluch. Hardzeika won the fight via a second-round TKO.

Three months later, he faced Siarhei Krapshyla on September 22. Hardzeika won the fight via a third-round TKO.

He returned a month later on October 6 against Igor Faniian. Hardzeika won the fight via Unanimous Decision.

=== 2019 ===
After a ten-month hiatus, he returned to the ring on August 31, 2019, against Bartłomiej Grafka. Hardzeika won the fight via Unanimous Decision.

He returned four months later on December 14 against debutant Oleg Pavlyak. Hardzeika won the fight via a Points Decision.

=== 2020 ===
After a near full year hiatus, Hardzeika returned on December 4, 2020, against Adam Grabiec. Hardzeika won the fight via a fifth-round TKO.

=== 2021 ===
He returned five months later on May 14, 2021, against Daniel Rutkowski. Hardzeika won the fight via Majority Decision.

After a seven-month hiatus, he returned on December 17 against Patrik Baláž. Hardzeika won the fight via Majority Decision.

=== 2024 ===
After over two years out, Hardzeika returned on February 17, 2024, against Ihor Morhun. Hardzeika won the fight via a fourth-round TKO.

=== 2025 ===
After another hiatus, Hardzeika returned on January 11, 2025, against Łukasz Barabasz. Hardzeika won the fight via Split Decision.

He returned on June 20 against Rafał Wołczecki for the vacant WBC Baltic middleweight title. Hardzeika lost the fight via Unanimous Decision.

His next fight came three months later on September 27 against Karol Welter. Hardzeika lost the fight via a ninth-round TKO.

His next fight came two months later on November 15 against Jan Lodzik. Hardzeika lost the fight via a Unanimous Decision, being his third loss in a row.

== Professional boxing record ==
17 fights	13 wins	4 losses
By knockout	5	2
By decision	8	2

No.	Result	Record	Opponent	Type	Round, time	Date	Location	Notes
17	Loss	13–4	Aleksander Bereżewski	TKO	7 (8), 1:09	24 Oct 2026	Nosalowy Dwór, Zakopane, Poland	
16	Loss	13–3	Jan Lodzik	UD	8	15 Nov 2025	Mazurkas Conference Center, Ożarów Mazowiecki, Poland	
15	Loss	13–2	Karol Welter	TKO	9 (10), 2:05	27 Sep 2025	Hala Widowiskowo-Sportowa, Ziębice, Poland	
14	Loss	13–1	Rafał Wołczecki	UD	10	20 Jun 2025	Hotel Terminal, Wrocław, Poland	For vacant WBC Baltic middleweight title
13	Win	13–0	Łukasz Barabasz	SD	6	11 Jan 2025	Hala Osrodka Sportu i Rekreacji, ul. Strumykowa 1, Dzierżoniów, Poland	
12	Win	12–0	Ihor Morhun	TKO	4 (6), 2:22	17 Feb 2024	Kinokavárna Brno, Brno, Czechia	
11	Win	11–0	Patrik Baláž	MD	8	17 Dec 2021	Hala MOSiR, Radom, Poland	
10	Win	10–0	Daniel Rutkowski	MD	8	14 May 2021	Transcolor, Szeligi, Poland	
9	Win	9–0	Adam Grabiec	TKO	5 (6), 0:49	4 Dec 2020	DoubleTree by Hilton Hotel, Łódź, Poland	
8	Win	8–0	Oleg Pavlyak	PTS	4	14 Dec 2019	Aqua Żyrardów, Żyrardów, Poland	
7	Win	7–0	Bartłomiej Grafka	UD	8	31 Aug 2019	Zalew Karczunek, Kałuszyn, Poland	
6	Win	6–0	Igor Faniian	UD	6	6 Oct 2018	Nosalowy Dwór, Zakopane, Poland	
5	Win	5–0	Siarhei Krapshyla	TKO	3 (4), 0:43	22 Sep 2018	Hala Sportowa im. Olimpijczyków, Łomża, Poland	
4	Win	4–0	Tomasz Goluch	TKO	2 (4), 2:51	2 Jun 2018	G2A Arena, Rzeszów, Poland	
3	Win	3–0	Daniel Przewieślik	UD	4	12 May 2018	Hala Sportowa, Wałcz, Poland	
2	Win	2–0	Alexander Benidze	UD	4	10 Feb 2018	Hala Nysa, Nysa, Poland	
1	Win	1–0	Matus Samaj	TKO	1 (4), 2:55	9 Sep 2017	Stadion Lekkoatletyczno-Piłkarski, Radom, Poland	
