= Middle East Professional Boxing =

Governing body of professional boxing in Middle East

- Abbreviation: MEPB
- Formation: 2016; 10 years ago
- Purpose: Boxing sanctioning organization
- Headquarters: Dubai, United Arab Emirates
- Region served: Middle East
- Official language: English, Arabic
- President: Jose Mohan
- Main organ: General Assembly
- Website: mepboxing.org

Middle East Professional Boxing (abbreviated MEPB) is the governing body of professional boxing and that sanctions title fights in the Middle East Countries - United Arab Emirates, Saudi Arabia, Kuwait and Qatar.

== History ==
The Middle East Professional Boxing Commission (MEPB) was founded in 2016 in Dubai, United Arab Emirates and serves as the authoritative body overseeing professional boxing activities across the Middle East. MEPB is dedicated to regulating and promoting the sport, ensuring the integrity and safety of all participants. Jose Mohan is the president of MEPB Commission.

== Awards ==
WBC Professional Boxing Commission of the year (2022)

== Notable events ==
MEPB is the first organization in the region to sanction professional boxing shows, with all major sanctioning bodies including WBC, WBA, IBF, and WBO. The only approved local commission in the mIddle east majorly focusing on Dubai, Abu Dhabi, Saudi Arabia (Riyadh Season), Oman and the MENA region in general.

=== Oleksandr Usyk Vs Anthony Joshua 2 ===
Rage On The Red Sea 2022 - Jeddah Superdome, Jeddah, Saudi Arabia

=== Jamel Herring vs Carl Frampton ===
WBO Title
2021 - Caesars Palace, Dubai, UAE

=== Bivol vs Ramirez ===
WBA Light Heavyweight World Championship
2022 - Etihad Arena, Abu Dhabi, UAE

=== Tyson Fury vs. Oleksandr Usyk ===
WBA (Super), WBC, IBF, WBO, IBO and The Ring undisputed heavyweight championship.
2023- Kingdom Arena, Riyadh Saudi Arabia.

== See also ==
- British Boxing Board of Control
- World Boxing Council
- World Boxing Association
- International Boxing Federation
- World Boxing Organization
