= Boxing at the 2015 European Games – Men's 60 kg =

Boxing competitions

Men's lightweight boxing at the 2015 European Games
- Venue: Baku Crystal Hall
- Date: 16–27 June
- Competitors: 22 from 22 nations

Medalists
gold medal	Albert Selimov	Azerbaijan
silver medal	Sofiane Oumiha	France
bronze medal	Seán McComb	Ireland
bronze medal	Mateusz Polski	Poland

The men's 60 kg boxing event at the 2015 European Games took place between 16 and 27 June at the Baku Crystal Hall.

== Results ==
Round of 32
Artjoms Ramlavs (LAT)	0
Otar Eranosyan (GEO)	3
Atdhe Gashi (GER)
Yasin Yılmaz (TUR)	TKO
Seán McComb (IRL)	3
Tymur Beliak (UKR)	0
Konstantin Bogomazov (RUS)	3
Edgaras Skurdelis (LTU)	0
Panagiotis Matsagkos (GRE)	0
Luke McCormack (GBR)	3
Matteo Komadina (CRO)	3
Igor Lazarev (ISR)	0

Round of 16
Albert Selimov (AZE)	3
Otar Eranosyan (GEO)	0
Elian Dimitrov (BUL)	3
Samvel Barseghyan (ARM)	0
Michal Zátorský (SVK)	1
Yasin Yılmaz (TUR)	2
Seán McComb (IRL)	3
Donato Cosenza (ITA)	0
Miklós Varga (HUN)	2
Konstantin Bogomazov (RUS)	0
Luke McCormack (GBR)	0
Sofiane Oumiha (FRA)	3
Vadim Ivaniuc (MDA)	0
Mateusz Polski (POL)	3
Matteo Komadina (CRO)	1
Vazgen Safaryants (BLR)	2

Quarterfinals
Albert Selimov (AZE)	3
Elian Dimitrov (BUL)	0
Yasin Yılmaz (TUR)	0
Seán McComb (IRL)	3
Miklós Varga (HUN)	0
Sofiane Oumiha (FRA)	3
Mateusz Polski (POL)	2
Vazgen Safaryants (BLR)	1

Semifinals
Albert Selimov (AZE)	3
Seán McComb (IRL)	0
Sofiane Oumiha (FRA)	3
Mateusz Polski (POL)	0

Final
Albert Selimov (AZE)	3
Sofiane Oumiha (FRA)	0
