= Rafał Wołczecki =

Polish boxer (born 1996)

Personal information
- Born: 10 November 1996 (age 29) Wrocław, Poland
- Height: 5 ft 10 in (178 cm)
- Weight: Middleweight

Boxing career
- Reach: 70.5 in (179 cm)
- Stance: Orthodox

Boxing record
- Total fights: 18
- Wins: 18
- Win by KO: 12
- No contests: 0

Rafał Wołczecki (born 10 November 1996) is a Polish professional boxer.

== Professional career ==
=== 2020 ===
Wołczecki made his professional debut on September 19, 2020 against Jakub Nasiłowski. He won the fight via TKO forty seconds into the first round.

He returned three months later against Nicaragua's Nelson Altamirano. Wołczecki won via a second-round TKO.

=== 2021 ===
He returned three months later against Ukraine's Dmytro Bohdanov. Wołczecki won via Unanimous Decision.

After an eight month layoff, Wołczecki returned to the ring against Oleg Lebedynskiy, whom he beat via a second-round TKO.

He returned a month later against Belarus's Siarhei Huliakevich. Wołczecki won via a second-round TKO.

=== 2022 ===
His next fight was three months later, when he took on Argentina's Mateo Damian Veron. Wołczecki won via Unanimous Decision.

After a seven month hiatus, he returned to the ring against Estonia's Pavel Semjonov. Wołczecki won via Unanimous Decision.

=== 2023 ===
His next fight was three months later, where he took on Joel Julio. Wołczecki won the fight via a first-round knockout.

He returned four months later against the Czech Republic's Pavel Albrecht. Wołczecki won via a second-round TKO.

His next fight was three months later, when he took on Nicaragua's Roberto Arriaza on the undercard of Oleksandr Usyk vs. Daniel Dubois. Wołczecki won via a third-round TKO.

=== 2024 ===
After a six month hiatus, he returned against Spain's Ayoub Zakari. Wołczecki won the fight via Unanimous Decision.

He returned two months later against Argentina's Damian Bonelli. Wołczecki won the fight via a sixth-round TKO.

After a seven month layoff, he returned in a bout against Przemysław Zyśk for the vacant Republic of Poland middleweight title. Wołczecki won via a first-round knockout, and thus claiming his first career championship.

=== 2025 ===
He returned two months later in a bout against Cuba's Yaniel Evander Rivera. Wołczecki won via a third-round TKO.

Five months later, he returned in the main event of Knockout Boxing Night 40 against Belarus's Maksim Hardzeika for the vacant WBC Baltic middleweight title. Wołczecki won the fight via Unanimous Decision.

After another five months, he returned in a bout against Denmark's Kim Poulsen. Wołczecki won the fight via a first-round knockout.

== Professional boxing record ==
18 fights	18 wins	0 losses
By knockout	12	0
By decision	6	0

No.	Result	Record	Opponent	Type	Round, time	Date	Location	Notes
18	Win	18–0	Luis Enrique Montelongo Morales	TKO	6 (8), 0:01	24 Oct 2026	Nosalowy Dwór, Zakopane, Poland	
17	Win	17–0	Emiliano Exequiel Pucheta	UD	8	17 Jan 2026	Hala Osrodka Sportu i Rekreacji, ul. Strumykowa 1, Dzierżoniów, Poland	
16	Win	16–0	Kim Poulsen	KO	1 (8), 1:35	22 Nov 2025	Hala MOSiR, Chełm, Poland	
15	Win	15–0	Maksim Hardzeika	UD	10	20 Jun 2025	Hotel Terminal, Wrocław, Poland	Won vacant WBC Baltic middleweight title
14	Win	14–0	Yaniel Evander Rivera	TKO	3 (8) 1:40	11 Jan 2025	Hala Osrodka Sportu i Rekreacji, ul. Strumykowa 1, Dzierżoniów, Poland	
13	Win	13–0	Przemysław Zyśk	KO	1 (10) 1:25	16 Nov 2024	KGHM Arena Ślęza, Wrocław, Poland	Won vacant Republic of Poland middleweight title
12	Win	12–0	Damian Bonelli	TKO	6 (8) 1:16	20 Apr 2024	KGHM Arena Ślęza, Wrocław, Poland	
11	Win	11–0	Ayoub Zakari	UD	8	24 Feb 2024	Opera i Filharmonia Podlaska, Białystok, Poland	
10	Win	10–0	Roberto Arriaza	TKO	3 (8) 2:59	26 Aug 2023	Wrocław Stadium, Wrocław, Poland	
9	Win	9–0	Pavel Albrecht	TKO	2 (8) 2:07	20 May 2023	Opera i Filharmonia Podlaska, Białystok, Poland	
8	Win	8–0	Joel Julio	KO	1 (8) 2:05	28 Jan 2023	Hala Sportowa, Nowy Sącz, Poland	
7	Win	7–0	Pavel Semjonov	UD	8	1 Oct 2022	Hala MOSiR Lublin, Poland	
6	Win	6–0	Mateo Damian Veron	UD	6	26 Mar 2022	Opera i Filharmonia Podlaska, Białystok, Poland	
5	Win	5–0	Siarhei Huliakevich	TKO	2 (6) 2:30	17 Dec 2021	Hala WOSiR, Wyszków, Poland	
4	Win	4–0	Oleg Lebedynskiy	TKO	2 (6) 1:48	27 Nov 2021	Hala Widowiskowo-sportowa, Ostrołęka, Poland	
3	Win	3–0	Dmytro Bohdanov	UD	4	27 Mar 2021	Hotel Warszawianka, Jachranka, Poland	
2	Win	2–0	Nelson Altamirano	TKO	2 (4) 1:05	4 Dec 2020	DoubleTree by Hilton Hotel, Łódź, Poland	
1	Win	1–0	Jakub Nasiłowski	TKO	1 (4) 0:48	19 Sep 2020	Arena Jaskółka, Tarnów, Poland	
