= Ezra Taylor (boxer) =

British boxer (born 1994)

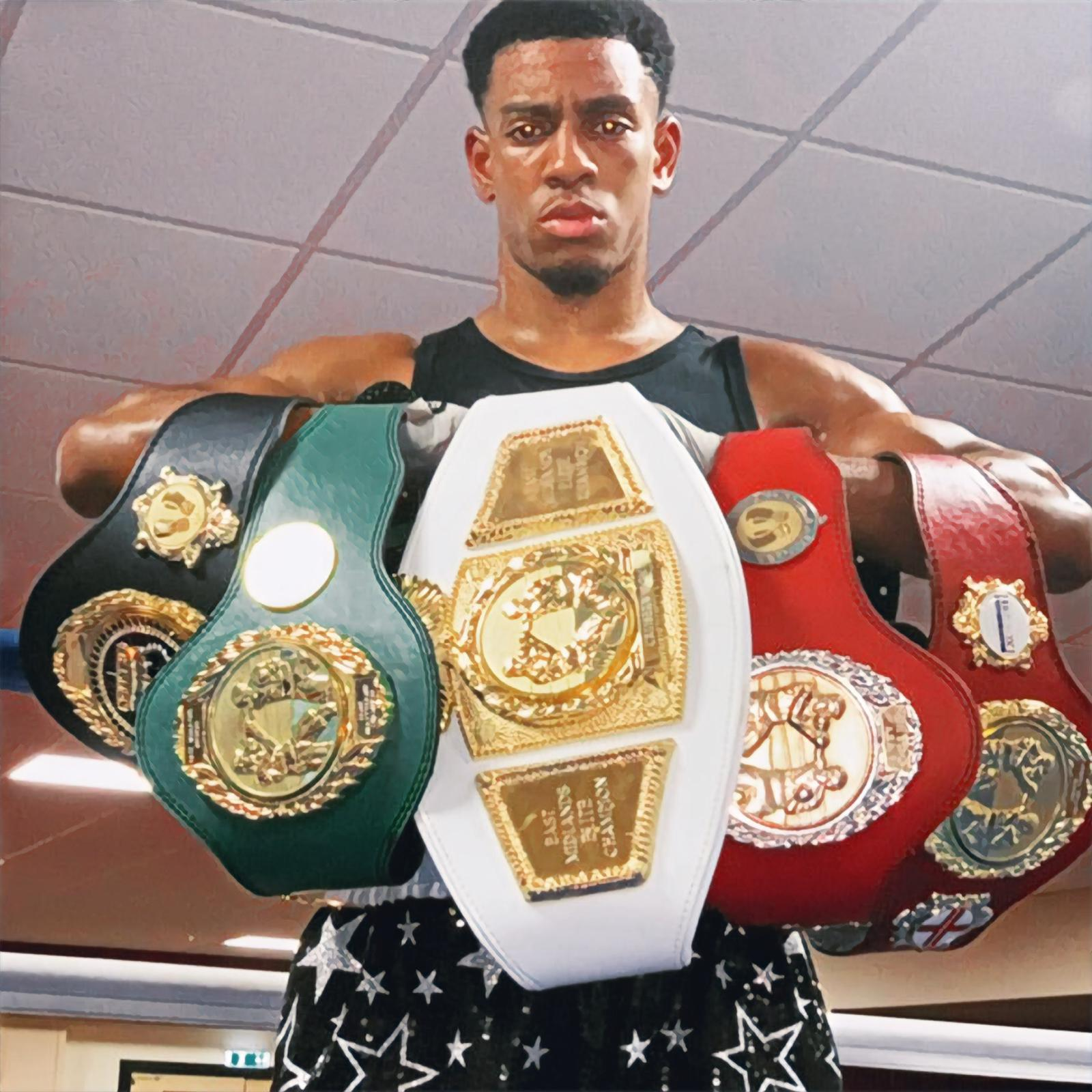

Personal information
- Nickname: The Cannon
- Born: 12 August 1994 (age 32) Nottingham, England
- Height: 6 ft 2 in (1.88 m)
- Weight: Light-heavyweight

Boxing career
- Stance: Orthodox

Boxing record
- Total fights: 15
- Wins: 13
- Win by KO: 9
- Losses: 2

Ezra Taylor (born 12 August 1994) is a British professional boxer.

== Amateur career ==
Taylor made a name for himself in the British amateur boxing circuit, being the first person to acquire five regional titles at the same time.

== Professional career ==
On 7 March 2020 Taylor made his professional debut, stopping his opponent with a big left hook in the second round, securing his victory against Jevgenijs Andrejevs at Harvey Hadden Sports Village, Nottingham, England.

He defeated Troy Jones by unanimous decision to win the vacant WBA Continental Gold light-heavyweight title at Nottingham Arena on 10 May 2025.

Taylor was scheduled to challenge British and Commonwealth light-heavyweight champion Lewis Edmondson at the O2 Arena in London on 25 October 2025. However, Edmondson withdrew six days before the fight due to a hip injury sustained during training camp. Instead Taylor faced Steed Woodall, winning by stoppage in the ninth round when his opponent's corner threw in the towel.

He suffered the first defeat of his professional career when he lost by unanimous decision to Willy Hutchinson at Co-op Live in Manchester on 26 March 2026.

Taylor challenged WBA Inter-Continental light-heavyweight champion Bradley Rea at AO Arena in Manchester on 7 November 2026. He was sent to the canvas in the second round and, although he got back to his feet and was allowed to continue, the referee stopped the contest a few seconds later as he came under another heavy barrage of unanswered punches, handing Rea the win via technical knockout.

== Professional boxing record ==
15 fights	13 wins	2 losses
By knockout	9	1
By decision	4	1

No.	Result	Record	Opponent	Type	Round, time	Date	Location	Notes
15	Loss	13–2	Bradley Rea	TKO	2 (10), 0:58	7 Nov 2026	AO Arena, Manchester, England	For WBA Inter-Continental light-heavyweight title
14	Loss	13–1	Willy Hutchinson	UD	10	28 Mar 2026	Co-op Live, Manchester, England	For vacant WBA Continental and WBO Global light-heavyweight titles
13	Win	13–0	Steed Woodall	TKO	9 (10), 0:54	25 Oct 2025	The O2 Arena, London, England	Retained the WBA Continental Gold light-heavyweight title
12	Win	12–0	Troy Jones	UD	10	10 May 2025	Motorpoint Arena, Nottingham, England	Won the vacant WBA Continental Gold light-heavyweight title
11	Win	11–0	Ryan Maycock	KO	2 (6), 1:25	7 Mar 2025	York Hall, Bethnal Green, England	
10	Win	10–0	Kristaps Bulmeistars	TKO	1 (10), 0:24	2 Nov 2024	bp pulse LIVE, Birmingham, England	
9	Win	9–0	Carlos Alberto Lamela	UD	10	20 Jul 2024	Resorts World Arena, Birmingham, England	Won vacant WBC International light-heavyweight title.
8	Win	8–0	Prince Oko Nartey	TKO	4 (10), 2:45	16 Mar 2024	Resorts World Arena, Birmingham, England	
7	Win	7–0	Joel McIntyre	TKO	8 (8), 2:59	23 Sep 2023	OVO Wembley Arena, Wembley, England	
6	Win	6–0	Khalid Graidia	PTS	8	9 Jun 2023	York Hall, Bethnal Green, England	
5	Win	5–0	Ales Makovec	TKO	2 (6), 2:38	25 Mar 2023	Telford International Centre, Telford, England	
4	Win	4–0	Mohamed Cherif Benchadi	TKO	2 (6), 1:53	19 Nov 2022	Telford International Centre, Telford, England	
3	Win	3–0	Veselin Vasilev	TKO	3 (4), 2:08	11 Jun 2022	Telford International Centre, Telford, England	
2	Win	2–0	Darryl Sharp	PTS	4	28 Aug 2021	Utilita Arena, Birmingham, England	
1	Win	1–0	Jevgenijs Andrejevs	TKO	2 (4), 1:08	7 Mar 2020	Harvey Hadden Sports Village, Nottingham, England	
