= Oleksandr Usyk vs Anthony Joshua II =

Boxing match

Rage on the Red Sea
- Date: 20 August 2022
- Venue: King Abdullah Sports City, Jeddah, Saudi Arabia
- Titles on the line: WBA (Super), IBF, WBO, IBO, and vacant The Ring heavyweight titles

Tale of the tape
Boxer	Oleksandr Usyk	Anthony Joshua
Nickname	The Cat	AJ
Hometown	Simferopol, Ukraine	London, England
Pre-fight record	19–0 (13 KO)	24–2 (22 KO)
Age	35 years, 7 months	32 years, 10 months
Height	6 ft 3 in (191 cm)	6 ft 6 in (198 cm)
Weight	221 1/2 lb (100 kg)	244 1/2 lb (111 kg)
Style	Southpaw	Orthodox
Recognition	WBA (Super), IBF, WBO and IBO; Heavyweight Champion; The Ring No. 2 ranked pound-for-pound fighter The Ring	IBF; No. 3 Ranked Heavyweight; WBA/WBO; No. 4 Ranked Heavyweight; The Ring

Result
- Usyk wins via 12–round split decision (113–115, 115–113, 116–112)

Oleksandr Usyk vs. Anthony Joshua II, billed as Rage on the Red Sea, was a heavyweight professional boxing match between WBA (Super), IBF, WBO, and IBO heavyweight champion, Oleksandr Usyk, and former heavyweight champion, Anthony Joshua. The bout took place on 20 August 2022 at King Abdullah Sports City in Jeddah, Saudi Arabia. Usyk won the 12-round bout by split decision, with scores of 116–112 and 115–113 in his favour, and 115–113 in favour of Joshua.

== Background ==
On 25 September 2021 at the Tottenham Hotspur Stadium in London, England, Anthony Joshua first faced Oleksandr Usyk, his WBO mandatory challenger, in a defence of his unified world heavyweight titles. Despite entering the bout as the reigning champion and the pre-fight betting favourite, Joshua was outboxed over the twelve-round distance as he suffered the second defeat of his professional career, losing via unanimous decision with judges' scorecards of 117–112, 116–112 and 115–113 all in Usyk's favour. The result meant that Usyk became only the second boxer ever, after Evander Holyfield, to win unified world titles in both the cruiserweight and heavyweight divisions.

Four days after the fight, on 29 September, it was announced by Usyk's promoter Alexander Krassyuk that a one-sided rematch clause which had been specified in the fight contract had "already been activated in principle, from the side of Joshua." Krassyuk noted that Usyk relished the prospect of squaring off against Joshua twice: "So I remember when we discussed with Oleksandr the issue of rematch, he was delighted and said 'Wow, cool, I will beat Anthony [sic] twice.'" Regarding the venue of the rematch, Usyk made it known that he hoped it would take place in his native country of Ukraine, saying, "I would love to have the rematch at Olimpiyskiy Stadium in Kyiv." However, Joshua's promoter, Eddie Hearn, stated that Ukraine was a "very unlikely" venue, as he wanted to maximise income: "I think it will be international or the UK, I would think it would be in the UK."

With the Russian invasion of Ukraine on 24 February 2022, a potential Usyk–Joshua rematch was thrown into doubt. In the days following the start of the invasion, Usyk posted on his social media channels to confirm that he had returned to Ukraine, and to plead with Russian president Vladimir Putin to stop the invasion, with one video captioned "No War". On 2 March, Usyk confirmed in a video interview with American news network CNN that he had taken up arms and joined a territorial defence battalion in Ukraine. Regarding his professional boxing career, Usyk said, "I really don't know when I'm going to be stepping back in the ring. My country and my honour are more important to me than a championship belt." In late March, it was reported that Usyk would be leaving Ukraine to begin preparations for the rematch with Joshua. Usyk revealed his decision to leave his homeland and refocus his efforts on boxing was supported by Mayor of Kyiv and former heavyweight champion Vitali Klitschko, as well as his younger brother Wladimir Klitschko, also a former heavyweight champion who had been defeated by Anthony Joshua in 2017.

On 19 June 2022, it was officially announced that Usyk would be facing Joshua in a rematch in Jeddah, Saudi Arabia on 20 August. The country put up a purse of roughly $77 million for the fighters to split through its sovereign wealth fund, Public Investment Fund. The fight would mark the first defence of Usyk's world heavyweight titles, while it would be Joshua's twelfth consecutive world heavyweight title fight as he attempted to become a three-time world heavyweight champion. Following Tyson Fury's decision to vacate The Ring heavyweight title on 13 August, it was announced that the now-vacant title would also be on the line, in addition to Usyk's world titles.

== Fight results ==
Despite Joshua's improved performance compared to his first loss to Usyk, the latter successfully defended his belts.

According to New York Times statistics, Joshua landed 37 body punches compared to 15 in their first fight. Overall, however, Usyk outperformed Joshua, landing 170 of 712 punches, compared with 124 of 492 for Joshua. Usyk also established new records for punches landed by an Anthony Joshua opponent (170) and most punches landed on Joshua in a single round (39 punches in the 10th round).

=== Scoring card by judges ===
1. Glenn Feldman (white): 115–113 for Joshua
2. Viktor Fesechko (blue): 116–112 for Usyk
3. Steve Gray (red): 115–113 for Usyk

The split decision was controversial and surprised the majority of viewers, who had expected a unanimous verdict for Usyk. The Ring magazine called Glenn Feldman's scorecard "horrible". Among those criticizing his judging were promoter Lou DiBella and boxing trainer Teddy Atlas. The event was sanctioned by the Middle East Professional Boxing Commission (MEPB).

The fight was well received. The Ring called it "excellent", The Sporting News called it "thrilling", Sky Sports called it "spectacular".

== Aftermath ==
Immediately after the fight, Joshua threw the title belts out of the ring and started to walk out of the arena, but came back and once in control of the microphone gave an emotional speech, talking about his life, fighting, Ukraine, and praising Usyk. After Joshua was done, Usyk said he wanted to fight Tyson Fury or, otherwise, he might not box again. He also dedicated his win to his country "Ukraine, Armed Forces of Ukraine" and everyone who was defending his country.

In the post-fight press conference, Joshua broke down in tears.

In early September 2022, details of the potential undisputed title fight with Fury started to surface. Usyk stated that Fury was not retired and was interested in the match. Fury's co-promoter, Bob Arum, stated that 17 December 2022, was discussed as the potential date of the fight. However, Usyk countered that the fight was unlikely to be held in 2022 due to his "old traumas which have resurfaced".

== Fight card ==
Weight Class		vs		Method	Round	Time	Notes
Heavyweight	Oleksandr Usyk (c)	def	Anthony Joshua	SD	12/12		^{Note 1}
Heavyweight	Filip Hrgović	def	Zhang Zhilei	UD	12/12		^{Note 2}
Light-heavyweight	Callum Smith	def	Mathieu Bauderlique	TKO	4/12		^{Note 3}
Cruiserweight	Badou Jack	def	Richard Rivera	SD	10/10
Heavyweight	Andrew Tabiti	def	James Wilson	RTD	5/8
Super-bantamweight	Ramla Ali	def	Crystal Garcia Nova	TKO	1/8
Light-heavyweight	Daniel Lapin	def	Jozef Jurko	UD	8/8
Super-middleweight	Benjamin Whittaker	def	Petar Nosić	UD	6/6
Lightweight	Bader Samreen	def	Fuad Tarverdi	TKO	4 (4)	1:16
Light-welterweight	Ziyad Almaayouf	def	Jose Alatorre	TKO	1 (4)	2:55
Welterweight	Traycho Georgiev	def	Money Kicks	SD	4/4		^{Note 4}

^Note 1 For WBA (Super), IBF, WBO, IBO, and vacant The Ring heavyweight titles
^Note 2 Final eliminator for IBF heavyweight title
^Note 3 Final eliminator for WBC light heavyweight title
^Note 4 Money Kicks' professional debut

== Broadcasting ==
Country	Broadcaster			
Country	Free-to-air	Cable/Pay TV	Stream	PPV
Ukraine	Suspilne; 2+2	MEGOGO	YouTube	—N/a
United Kingdom	Sky Sports Boxing YouTube (undercard)	Sky Sports Action; Sky Sports Arena (undercard)	—N/a	Sky Sports Box Office
Worldwide	—N/a		DAZN	—N/a

Preceded by First fight	Oleksandr Usyk's bouts 20 August 2022	Succeeded by vs. Daniel Dubois
Preceded by First fight	Anthony Joshua's bouts 20 August 2022	Succeeded by vs. Jermaine Franklin
