= Mateusz Polski =

Polish boxer (born 1993)

Personal information
- Other names: Polaczek
- Nationality: Poland
- Born: 6 August 1993 (age 33) Białogard, Poland
- Height: 5 ft 7 in (1.70 m)
- Weight: 149

Boxing career
- Reach: 67 in (170 cm)
- Stance: Southpaw

Boxing record
- Total fights: 12
- Wins: 11
- Win by KO: 3
- Losses: 1
- Draws: 0
- No contests: 0
Medal record
Men's amateur boxing
Representing Poland
European Amateur Championships
Bronze medal – third place	2017 Kharkiv	Light welterweight
European Games
Bronze medal – third place	2015 Baku	Light welterweight

Mateusz Polski (born 5 February 1993) is a Polish boxer. He competed in the Light Welterweight event at the 2017 European Amateur Boxing Championships and 2015 European Games

== Professional career ==
Polski made his professional debut on March 19, 2022 in a bout against Tornike Kandelaki. He would win his debut via TKO in the second round.

His first title match came in his third bout against Tanzania's Adam Ngange. They would face off for the vacant Republic of Poland International super lightweight title. Polski would win the fight via KO in the first round, and thus winning his first professional title.

In his next fight, he would face off against Denis Mądry for the vacant Republic of Poland super lightweight title. Polski would win his second title via Unanimous Decision.

His next title fight came against Jan Lodzik, where they faced off for the WBC Francophone welterweight title. Polski would lose to Lodzik, suffering his first defeat, and in the process didn't win the title, and fell down to 5–1.

After a five month layoff, Polski would return on March 2, 2024 in a bout against Michał Bulik, which he would win via unanimous decision, and thus reentering the win column.

Three months later, he would return to have a rematch against Jan Lodzik for the WBC Francophone welterweight title. This time around, Polski would win the fight via Unanimous Decision, and thus claiming the Francophone title in the process.

Four months later, he would face off against Venezuela's Luis Enrique Romero in an 8-Round bout. Polski would win once again, this time via Split Decision, and thus improving his record to 8–1.

After almost half a year out of the ring, he would return on 6 April 2025 in a bout against Nourdeen Toure. Polski would win the fight by yet another Unanimous Decision and thus improving to 9–1.

== Professional boxing record ==
11 fights	10 wins	1 loss
By knockout	3	0
By decision	7	1

No.	Result	Record	Opponent	Type	Round, time	Date	Location	Notes
12	Win	11–1	(Poland) Igor Pryga	UD	10	25 Apr 2026	Hala Sportowa Sokolnia, Kościerzyna, Poland	Won vacant WBC Baltic Silver and Republic of Poland welterweight titles
11	Win	10–1	(Venezuela) Joniker Tovar	UD	8	20 Sep 2025	Hala Sportowa, Żukowo, Poland	
10	Win	9–1	(Togo) Nourdeen Toure	UD	8	6 Apr 2025	Hala Szkoły Podstawowej nr 50, Białystok, Poland	
9	Win	8–1	(Venezuela) Luis Enrique Romero	SD	8	26 Oct 2024	Hala Sportowa, Żukowo, Poland	
8	Win	7–1	(Poland) Jan Lodzik	UD	10	8 Jun 2024	Regionalne Centrum Turystyki i Sportu, Karlino, Poland	Won WBC Francophone welterweight Title
7	Win	6–1	(Poland) Michał Bulik	UD	8	2 Mar 2024	Hala Widowiskowo-Sportowa, Koszalin, Poland	
6	Loss	5–1	(Poland) Jan Lodzik	UD	10	20 Oct 2023	Arena Legionowo, Legionowo, Poland	For WBC Francophone welterweight Title
5	Win	5–0	(Georgia (country)) Konstantine Jangavadze	UD	6	9 Sep 2023	Lodowisko BOSiR, Białystok, Poland	
4	Win	4–0	(Poland) Denis Mądry	UD	10	2 Jun 2023	Hala Sportowa, Żukowo, Poland	Won vacant Republic of Poland super lightweight title
3	Win	3–0	(Tanzania) Adam Ngange	KO	1 (10) 1:24	2 Oct 2022	Regionalne Centrum Turystyki i Sportu, Karlino, Poland	Won vacant Republic of Poland International super lightweight title
2	Win	2–0	(Tanzania) Saidi Mundi	KO	2 (6) 1:11	14 May 2022	Gdanski Teatr Szekspirowski, Gdańsk, Poland	
1	Win	1–0	(Georgia (country)) Tornike Kandelaki	TKO	2 (6) 1:24	19 Mar 2022	Hala Widowiskowo-Sportowa, Stężyca, Poland	
