= Jan Lodzik =

Polish boxer and kickboxer (born 1995)

- Born: January 1995 (age 31); Wałcz, Poland
- Nickname: Iron
- Nationality: Polish
- Height: 1.69 m (5 ft 6 1/2 in)
- Stance: Orthodox
- Fighting out of: Legionowo, Poland
- Team: Warszawska Szkoła Boksu; Tajfun Legionowo
- Years active: 2014 - present

Professional boxing record
- Total: 14
- Wins: 12
- By knockout: 3
- Losses: 2

Kickboxing record
- Total: 22
- Wins: 18
- By knockout: 5
- Losses: 4
- By knockout: 0
- Draws: 0

Other information
- Boxing record from BoxRec

Jan Lodzik (born January 1995) is a Polish professional boxer and kickboxer. He is a former DSF Kickboxing and Babilon K-1 Featherweight champion. In boxing, he has previously held the Republic of Poland International super lightweight, IBA Intercontinental super welterweight, and WBC Francophone welterweight championships.

== Kickboxing career ==
=== Early career ===
Lodzik’s first professional win was in October 13, 2014, against Marcin Borecki Wyszkowska Gala Sportów Walki

His second professional fight came on October 4, 2014, against Krzysztof Olszewski. Lodzik won the fight via a Split Decision, winning the 2014 Czech K-1 Championship in the process.

=== King of Kings ===
Lodzik made his debut under King of Kings on November 15, 2014, against Martynas Danius. Lodzik lost the fight via a Points Decision.

=== DSF Kickboxing Challenge ===
Lodzik made his debut under DSF Kickboxing Challenge on June 12, 2015, against Mateusz Rajewski. Lodzik won the fight via a Unanimous Decision.

His next fight came on December 12, 2015, against Maksim Petkevich. Lodzik won the fight via a Points Decision.

His next fight came on April 23, 2016, against Dovydas Armalis. Lodzik won the fight via a first-round knockout.

His next fight came on July 9, 2016, against Andrej Bruhl. Lodzik lost the fight via a Points Decision.

=== Piaseczno Fight Night ===
Lodzik made his debut under Piaseczno Fight Night on November 24, 2016, against Artur Yanchenko. Lodzik won the fight via a Unanimous Decision.

=== Return to DSF Kickboxing Challenge ===
He returned to DSF Kickboxing Challenge on December 16, 2016, against Valery Stepashihin. Lodzik won the fight via a first-round knockout.

==== DSF Featherweight Champion ====
His next fight came on March 31, 2017, in a rematch against Mateusz Rajewski for the vacant DSF Featherweight (65 kg) championship. Lodzik won the fight via a Split Decision, winning his second career championship.

His next fight came on June 23, 2017, against Oleksandr Ukrainets in a non-title bout. Lodzik won the fight via an Extra Round Decision.

His next fight came on March 9, 2018, against Murat Azerbiev in a non-title bout. Lodzik won the fight via a Split Decision.

His first title defense came on May 18, 2018, against Yuri Zhukovsky. Lodzik won the fight via a Unanimous Decision.

His second title defense came on October 6, 2018, against Aliaksei Zdunkevich. Lodzik won the fight via a third-round TKO.

His third title defense came on January 24, 2019, against Eliasz Jankowski. Lodzik lost the fight via a Unanimous Decision, losing the championship in the process.

=== Babilon MMA/Boxing Show ===
Lodzik made his debut under Babilon MMA on September 25, 2020, against Mateusz Białecki. Lodzik won the fight via a Split Decision.

His next fight came on December 17, 2021, in a trilogy against Mateusz Rajewski under the Babilon Boxing Show banner. Lodzik won the fight via a Split Decision.

His next fight came on October 28, 2022, against Maciej Zembik. Lodzik won the fight via a second-round TKO.

==== Babilon K1 International Featherweight Champion ====
Lodzik faced Michał Królik on February 24, 2023, for the vacant Babilon K1 International Featherweight Championship. Lodzik won the fight via a Unanimous Decision, winning his third career championship.

His first title defense came on February 23, 2024, against Juanmi Martinez. Lodzik won the fight via a Unanimous Decision.

His next fight came on March 14, 2025, in a quadrilogy against Mateusz Rajewski in a non-title bout. Lodzik lost the fight via a Unanimous Decision.

== Boxing career ==
Lodzik made his professional boxing debut on November 30, 2019, against Kristian Nguyen. Lodzik won the fight via a Unanimous Decision.

His next fight came on December 20, 2019, against Oleksandr Spoda. Lodzik won the fight via a first-round TKO.

Two week after, he fight on July 31, 2020, against Markko Moisar. Lodzik also won the fight via a Points Decision.

His next fight came on December 5, 2020, against Damian Tymosz. Lodzik won the fight via a Unanimous Decision.

Lodzik faced Agustin Gerbaldo Kucharski on April 9, 2021, for the vacant Republic of Poland International super lightweight title. Lodzik won the fight via a Split Decision, winning his first boing championship.

His next fight came on October 29, 2021, against Patrik Baláž. Lodzik won the fight via a Unanimous Decision.

His next fight came on May 13, 2022, against Domenico Valentino. Lodzik won the fight via a Unanimous Decision.

Lodzik faced Konrad Dąbrowski on May 13, 2023, for the vacant IBA Intercontinental super welterweight title. Lodzik won the fight via a fifth-round TKO, winning his second boxing championship.

In his next fight, he faced Mateusz Polski on October 20, 2023, for the vacant WBC Francophone welterweight title. Lodzik won the fight via a Unanimous Decision, winning his third boxing championship.

In his first title defense, he faced Polski in a rematch on June 8, 2024. Lodzik lost the fight via a Unanimous Decision, losnig his championship.

Following his loss, he faced Maksim Hardzeika on November 15, 2025. Lodzik won the fight via a Unanimous Decision.

== Championships and accomplishments ==
=== Kickboxing ===
- DSF Kickboxing Challenge
  - DSF Kickboxing Challenge Featherweight Champion (One time; former)
    - Two successful title defenses
- Babilon Boxing Show
  - Babilon K-1 Featherweight Champion (One time; former)
    - One successful title defenses
- 2014 Czech K-1 Championship (Winner)

=== Boxing ===
- World Boxing Council
  - WBC Francophone Welterweight Champion (One time; former)
- International Boxing Association
  - IBA Intercontinental Super Welterweight (One time; former)
- Polska Unia Boksu
  - Republic of Poland International Super Lightweight Champion (One time; former)

== Professional boxing record ==
14 fights	12 wins	2 losses
By knockout	3	0
By decision	9	2

No.	Result	Record	Opponent	Type	Round, time	Date	Location	Notes
14	Loss	12–2	Bartłomiej Przybyła	PTS	8	28 Aug 2026	Hotel Sheraton, Sopot, Poland	
13	Win	12–1	Jamshid Rikhsiev	RTD	3 (6), 3:00	24 Apr 2026	Centrum Sportu Raszyn, Raszyn, Poland	
12	Win	11–1	Maksim Hardzeika	UD	8	15 Nov 2025	Mazurkas Conference Center, Ożarów Mazowiecki, Poland	
11	Loss	10–1	Mateusz Polski	UD	10	8 Jun 2024	Regionalne Centrum Turystyki i Sportu, Karlino, Poland	Lost WBC Francophone welterweight title
10	Win	10–0	Mateusz Polski	UD	10	20 Oct 2023	Arena Legionowo, Legionowo, Poland	Won vacant WBC Francophone welterweight title
9	Win	9–0	Konrad Dąbrowski	TKO	5 (10), 2:59	13 May 2023	Hala Sportowa, ul. Harcerska 1, Ząbki, Poland	Won vacant IBA Intercontinental super welterweight title
8	Win	8–0	Domenico Valentino	UD	10	13 May 2022	Hala MCKiS, Jaworzno, Poland	
7	Win	7–0	Mateusz Rajewski	UD	8x2min	25 Feb 2022	Aqua Żyrardów , Żyrardów , Poland	
6	Win	6–0	Patrik Baláž	UD	8	29 Oct 2021	Hala MCKiS, Jaworzno, Poland	
5	Win	5–0	Agustin Gerbaldo Kucharski	SD	10	9 Apr 2021	Klub Explosion, Warsaw, Poland	Won vacant Republic of Poland International super lightweight title
4	Win	4–0	Damian Tymosz	UD	8	5 Dec 2020	DoubleTree by Hilton Hotel Conference Centre, Warsaw, Poland	
3	Win	3–0	Markko Moisar	PTS	6	31 Jul 2020	Goliat Security Building, Radom, Poland	
2	Win	2–0	Oleksandr Spoda	TKO	1 (4), 1:13	20 Dec 2019	Hala Sportowa ul. Młodzieżowa 1, Nowy Dwór Mazowiecki, Poland	
1	Win	1–0	Kristian Nguyen	UD	4	30 Nov 2019	Centrum Sportu Raszyn, Raszyn, Poland	

== Kickboxing and K-1 record ==
Professional kickboxing record
18 Wins (5 (T)KOs), 4 Losses, 0 Draws
Date	Result	Opponent	Event	Location	Method	Round	Time
2025-03-15	Loss	(Poland) Mateusz Rajewski	Babilon MMA 51	Ciechanów, Poland	Decision (Unanimous)	3	3:00
2024-02-23	Win	(Spain) Juanmi Martinez	Babilon Boxing & K-1 Show	Nowy Dwór Mazowiecki, Poland	Decision (Unanimous)	5	3:00
Defends the Babilon K-1 Featherweight (65 kg) Championship.
2023-02-24	Win	(Poland) Michał Królik	Babilon Boxing & K-1 Show	Nowy Dwór Mazowiecki, Poland	Decision (Unanimous)	5	3:00
Wins the vacant Babilon K-1 Featherweight (65 kg) Championship.
2022-10-28	Win	(Poland) Maciej Zembik	Babilon MMA 31	Grodzisk Mazowiecki, Poland	TKO (3 knockdown rule)	2	2:59
2021-12-17	Win	(Poland) Mateusz Rajewski	Babilon Boxing Show	Radom, Poland	Decision (Split)	3	3:00
2020-09-25	Win	(Poland) Mateusz Białecki	Babilon MMA 16	Legionowo, Poland	Decision (Split)	3	3:00
2019-01-24	Loss	(Poland) Eliasz Jankowski	DSF Kickboxing Challenge 19	Warsaw, Poland	Decision (Unanimous)	5	3:00
Loses the DSF Featherweight (65kg) Championship.
2018-10-06	Win	(Belarus) Aliaksei Zdunkevich	DSF Kickboxing Challenge: Piaseczno Fight Night	Piaseczno, Poland	TKO	3	2:54
Retains the DSF Featherweight (65kg) Championship.
2018-05-18	Win	(Belarus) Yuri Zhukovsky	DSF Kickboxing Challenge 15	Warsaw, Poland	Decision (Unanimous)	5	3:00
Retains the DSF Featherweight (65kg) Championship.
2018-03-09	Win	(Belarus) Murat Azerbiev	DSF Kickboxing Challenge: Twierdza	Nowy Dwór Mazowiecki, Poland	Decision (Split)	3	3:00
2017-06-23	Win	(Ukraine) Oleksandr Ukrainets	DSF Kickboxing Challenge 10	Nowy Sącz, Poland	Ext R. Decision	4	3:00
2017-03-31	Win	(Poland) Mateusz Rajewski	DSF Kickboxing Challenge 9	Warsaw, Poland	Decision (Split)	5	3:00
Wins the vacant DSF Featherweight (65kg) Championship.
2016-12-16	Win	(Belarus) Valery Stepashihin	DSF Kickboxing Challenge	Warsaw, Poland	KO	1	N/A
2016-11-24	Win	(Belarus) Artur Yanchenko	Piaseczno Fight Night 5	Piaseczno, Poland	Decision (Unanimous)	3	3:00
2016-07-09	Loss	(Germany) Andrej Bruhl	DSF Kickboxing Challenge 8	Ząbki, Poland	Decision (Points)	3	3:00
2016-04-23	Win	(Lithuania) Dovydas Armalis	DSF Kickboxing Challenge 7	Warsaw, Poland	KO (Body Kick)	1	0:41
2015-12-12	Win	(Belarus) Maksim Petkevich	DSF Kickboxing Challenge 6	Ząbki, Poland	Decision (Points)	3	3:00
2015-06-12	Win	(Poland) Mateusz Rajewski	DSF Kickboxing Challenge	Włocławek, Poland	Decision (Unanimous)	3	3:00
2014-11-15	Loss	(Lithuania) Martynas Danius	KOK Hero's Series 2014	Vilnius, Lithuania	Decision (Split)	3	3:00
2014-10-04	Win	(Poland) Krzysztof Olszewski	Mistrovství České republiky v K-1 2014	Prague, Czech Republic	Decision (Split)	3	3:00
Wins the vacant 2014 Czech K-1 Championship
2013-27-10	Win	(Poland) Marcin Borecki	Wyszkowska Gala Sportów Walki	Wyszków, Poland	TKO (Eye Cut)	2	-
