= Anthony Yarde =

English boxer (born 1991)

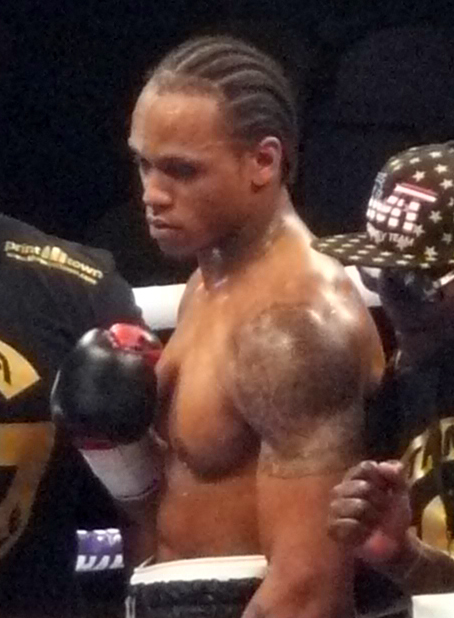
- Yarde in 2016

Personal information
- Nickname: The Beast from the East
- Born: 13 August 1991 (age 35) Hackney, London, England
- Height: 5 ft 10.5 in (179 cm)
- Weight: Light-heavyweight

Boxing career
- Reach: 72 in (183 cm)
- Stance: Orthodox

Boxing record
- Total fights: 31
- Wins: 27
- Win by KO: 24
- Losses: 4

Anthony Yarde (/ˈjɑːrd/ YARD; born 13 August 1991) is a British professional boxer. He has challenged for the world light-heavyweight championship three times; for the WBO title in 2019, unified WBC, IBF and WBO titles in 2023, and WBC and WBA (Regular) titles in 2025. At regional level, he has held multiple light-heavyweight championships, including the Commonwealth title from 2021 to 2022.

== Professional career ==
=== Early career ===
Yarde began boxing competitively at a relatively late age and only had twelve amateur fights prior to turning professional. In May 2015, he made his professional debut with a second-round knockout (KO) victory over Mitch Mitchell.

After compiling a record of 10–0 (9 KOs) he captured the Southern Area light-heavyweight title, dropping reigning champion Chris Hobbs to the canvas six times en route to a fourth-round technical knockout (TKO) victory on 20 May 2017 at the Copper Box Arena in London.

Two months later he defeated Richard Baranyi via first-round TKO on 8 July at the Copper Box Arena, capturing the WBO European light-heavyweight title.

=== Rise up the ranks ===
He was scheduled to face Canadian boxer Ryan Ford, a former mixed martial artist, on 16 September 2017 for the vacant WBO Inter-Continental light-heavyweight title. Nobert Nemesapati was brought in as a replacement after Ford pulled out of the bout. After dropping his opponent to the canvas twice in the second round, Yarde captured his second regional title—retaining his WBO European title in the process—with a third-round stoppage via corner retirement (RTD).

Yarde made three defences of his WBO regional titles and a further two defences of his WBO Inter-Continental title, winning all five by stoppage,

=== World title challenge ===
He next challenged Sergey Kovalev for the WBO light-heavyweight title on 24 August 2019 at the Traktor Sport Palace in Chelyabinsk, Russia. Yarde suffered the first defeat of his professional career, losing by TKO in the eleventh round. Yarde seemed comfortable in the early rounds, staying out of range and keeping Kovalev at bay with speed and movement. After six rounds of an even, back and forth contest, Yarde began landing accurate hooks to Kovalev's body in the seventh and eighth rounds that appeared to hurt the champion. In the last minute of the eighth, Yarde landed a straight-right to the head of Kovalev which had the veteran in trouble. Yarde followed up with an accurate salvo of power punches but was unable to capitalise, allowing the visibly hurt Kovalev to stay on his feet for the remainder of the round. After his success in the seventh and eighth rounds, Yarde appeared to tire and lose momentum in the ninth, allowing Kovalev to take control of the fight with combination punches and stiff jabs that began to frequently land on Yarde. The tenth round saw much of the same. In the final 20 seconds of the round, after being backed up against the ropes by Kovalev and being on the receiving end of a flurry of punches with no reply, Yarde was seemingly saved by the bell, which appeared to ring 8 seconds before the end of the round. In round eleven, sensing Yarde's fatigue, Kovalev upped the pressure and increased his punch output, eventually dropping Yarde with a spearing left-jab to win the fight by knockout. At the time of the stoppage, all three judges had Kovalev ahead with the scorecards reading 98–92, 97–94 and 96–93. In a post-fight interview with Steve Bunce for BT Sport, Kovalev praised Yarde's defence and boxing IQ, insisting Yarde will "100%" be a world champion in the future.

=== Career from 2020—2022 ===
In his comeback fight, Yarde faced Diego Jair Ramirez on 8 February 2020 in a six rounder. Yarde, then ranked #7 by the WBO and #11 by the WBC knocked out his unranked opponent in two rounds.

In his next fight, Yarde fought Dec Spelman. Yarde looked a little rusty, but still managed to outperform his opponent, knocking him out in the sixth round of the contest, setting himself up for a shot at the vacant Commonwealth light-heavyweight title.

==== Yarde vs. Arthur ====
On 5 December 2020, Yarde, ranked #9 by The Ring and the WBC, #1 by the WBO and #10 by the IBF at light heavyweight faced Lyndon Arthur, who was ranked #6 by the WBO and the IBF for the Commonwealth light-heavyweight title. Arthur injured his right hand during the warm-up and utilized his jab for most of the fight. This would prove successful for Arthur, as he ended up winning the fight via split-decision, 115–114, 115–114 and 111–117.

On 28 August 2021, Yarde faced Colombian Alex Theran. In the first round, Yarde dropped Theran with a left hook to the body. Theran just survived the count, but succumbed to a second left hook to the body shortly afterwards. The fight ended 2 minutes and 32 seconds in to the first round.

==== Yarde vs. Arthur II ====
On 4 December 2021, Yarde defeated Lyndon Arthur in their much anticipated rematch via knockout in the 4th round.

=== World title challenges ===
On 19 June 2022, a day after Artur Beterbiev unified against Joe Smith Jr., Yarde's promoter Frank Warren claimed that he and Bob Arum had already agreed terms for the two boxers to fight next, likely in London. He still expected the WBO to order the fight as a mandatory as Yarde was their number one ranked. Yarde and his team attended the event. He told reporters, “What I took away from it is what we already know. Beterbiev is a heavy hitter. A strong Russian. The Russian system, they know how to land their punches. He’s 18-0, with 18 KOs. I think it’s an even more exciting matchup.” Eddie Hearn, who promoted Beterbiev's rival Dmitry Bivol, called the fight a 'mismatch' and referred to Yarde as a domestic level fighter.

The fight was expected to take place on 29 October at The O2 Arena in London, England. Beterbiev (18-0, 18 KOs) withdrew from the bout on 19 August, due to an undisclosed injury. The fight to pushed back to early 2023 and Yarde was expected to take a stay-busy fight in November. Beterbiev's trainer said the injury was not serious and was on the back of the knee surgery he had following the Smith Jr. fight. Beterbiev only rested for two weeks before resuming his training. The fight was rescheduled to take place on 28 January 2023. In November, at WBC annual convention, Matchroom Boxing's Kevin Rooney Jr. requested that Callum Smith be named as their mandatory. This request was approved, but would not be called until after the Beterbiev-Yarde fight. On 19 November, Yarde knocked out Stefani Koykov in 3 rounds and a press release was issued announcing Beterbiev vs. Yarde to take place at the OVO Arena Wembley.

Speaking in an interview with BT Sport, Yarde discussed how he had matured as a fighter since his last world title attempt. He said, “I’m a lot more confident. I’m a lot more mentally and physically sound. I’ve been at this level for a while and I’m ready. Stylistically, me against Beterbiev is a blockbuster fight. Someone’s getting knocked out.” He mentioned he was also a lot calmer. During the Fury-Chisora trilogy, Yarde took some advice from unified heavyweight champion Oleksandr Usyk, but never revealed the advice he received. Usyk defeated Beterbiev in the amateurs twice. Once at the 2011 World Championship and again at the 2012 London Olympics. Beterbiev was untroubled and responded to this saying, "I don't know. If it helps him, then good for him. What can Usyk give him?" Beterbiev weighed 174 ½ pounds, and Yarde weighed in at 174 ¼ pounds.

Beterbiev won the fight by an eighth-round stoppage. After hurting Yarde in the seventh round, Beterbiev came out the next round looking for a stoppage. He knocked Yarde down with a counter right hook to an attempted uppercut, which dropped Yarde to his hand and knees at the midway point of the round. Although referee Steve Gray allowed the bout to continue, the corner of Yarde threw in the towel a few seconds later. The time of stoppage was 2:01 of the round. Beterbiev was down 68–65 and 67–66 on two of the judges' scorecards at the time of the stoppage. Beterbiev out-landed Yarde 135 to 111 in total punches and 84 to 75 in power punches at the time off stoppage.

Arum praised the fight, calling it 'one of the great light heavyweight battles' he had ever seen. Speaking after the fight, Beterbiev said, “I want Bivol. Right now, it’s everything. “In that fight, we’ll have four belts. It’s really good fight, I think.” Beterbiev would still need to manoeuvre around his mandatories. Beterbiev praised Yarde. He acknowledged his power and believed he still had time to grow in the support and become successful. Beterbiev was only getting started by the time the eighth round came. He did not do the best job in attempting to avoid Yarde's punches. This is what made it a great fight. Yarde was asked about his corner stopping the fight despite the referee giving him the go-ahead to continue the fight. He defended his teams decision, “Tunde and my team, they care about me and love me, they’re seeing something that I’m not seeing.”

Yarde defeated Ralfs Vilcans on points in a 10-round bout at the Copper Box Arena in London, England, on 19 October 2024.

He defeated Lyndon Arthur on the undercard of Chris Eubank Jr vs. Conor Benn at the Tottenham Hotspur Stadium on 26 April 2025.

Yarde challenged WBC and WBA (regular) light heavyweight champion David Benavidez at ANB Arena in Riyadh, Saudi Arabia, on 22 November 2025. He lost by technical knockout in the seventh round.

== Professional boxing record ==
31 fights	27 wins	4 losses
By knockout	24	3
By decision	3	1

No.	Result	Record	Opponent	Type	Round, time	Date	Location	Notes
31	Loss	27–4	David Benavidez	TKO	7 (12) 1:59	22 Nov 2025	Kingdom Arena, Riyadh, Saudi Arabia	For WBC and WBA (Regular) light heavyweight titles
30	Win	27–3	Lyndon Arthur	UD	12	26 Apr 2025	Tottenham Hotspur Stadium, London, England	
29	Win	26–3	Ralfs Vilcans	PTS	10	19 Oct 2024	Copper Box Arena, London, England	
28	Win	25–3	Marko Nikolic	KO	3 (10) 1:15	10 Feb 2024	Copper Box Arena, London, England	
27	Win	24–3	Jorge Silva	KO	2 (10) 2:07	23 Sep 2023	OVO Arena Wembley, London, England	
26	Loss	23–3	Artur Beterbiev	TKO	8 (12), 2:01	28 Jan 2023	OVO Arena Wembley, London, England	For WBC, IBF, and WBO light-heavyweight titles
25	Win	23–2	Stefani Koykov	KO	3 (10), 2:31	19 Nov 2022	Telford International Centre, Telford, England	
24	Win	22–2	Lyndon Arthur	KO	4 (12), 1:27	4 Dec 2021	Copper Box Arena, London, England	Won Commonwealth and WBO Inter-Continental light-heavyweight titles
23	Win	21–2	Alex Theran	TKO	1 (10), 2:32	28 Aug 2021	Arena Birmingham, Birmingham, England	
22	Loss	20–2	Lyndon Arthur	SD	12	5 Dec 2020	Church House, London, England	For Commonwealth and vacant WBO Inter-Continental light-heavyweight titles
21	Win	20–1	Dec Spelman	TKO	6 (10), 2:42	12 Sep 2020	BT Sport Studio, London, England	
20	Win	19–1	Diego Jair Ramirez	TKO	2 (6), 2:55	8 Feb 2020	Discoteca Memphis, Madrid, Spain	
19	Loss	18–1	Sergey Kovalev	KO	11 (12), 2:04	24 Aug 2019	Traktor Sport Palace, Chelyabinsk, Russia	For WBO light-heavyweight title
18	Win	18–0	Travis Reeves	TKO	5 (10), 0:48	8 Mar 2019	Royal Albert Hall, London, England	Retained WBO Inter-Continental light-heavyweight title
17	Win	17–0	Walter Gabriel Sequeira	TKO	4 (10), 2:14	20 Oct 2018	Brentwood Centre, Brentwood, England	Retained WBO Inter-Continental light-heavyweight title
16	Win	16–0	Dariusz Sęk	TKO	7 (10), 2:17	23 Jun 2018	The O2 Arena, London, England	Retained WBO European and WBO Inter-Continental light-heavyweight titles
15	Win	15–0	Tony Averlant	RTD	7 (10), 3:00	24 Feb 2018	York Hall, London, England	Retained WBO European and WBO Inter-Continental light-heavyweight titles
14	Win	14–0	Nikola Sjekloća	TKO	4 (10), 1:52	9 Dec 2017	Copper Box Arena, London, England	Retained WBO European and WBO Inter-Continental light-heavyweight titles
13	Win	13–0	Norbert Nemesapati	RTD	3 (12), 3:00	16 Sep 2017	Copper Box Arena, London, England	Retained WBO European light-heavyweight title; Won vacant WBO Inter-Continental light-heavyweight title
12	Win	12–0	Richard Baranyi	TKO	1 (10), 2:21	8 Jul 2017	Copper Box Arena, London, England	Won WBO European light-heavyweight title
11	Win	11–0	Chris Hobbs	TKO	4 (10), 2:51	20 May 2017	Copper Box Arena, London, England	Won Southern Area light-heavyweight title
10	Win	10–0	Darren Snow	KO	1 (6), 2:17	22 Apr 2017	Leicester Arena, Leicester, England	
9	Win	9–0	Ferenc Albert	TKO	1 (6), 1:36	25 Nov 2016	Brentwood Centre, Brentwood, England	
8	Win	8–0	Rayford Johnson	TKO	1 (6), 2:10	Sep 17, 2016	AT&T Stadium, Arlington, Texas, US	
7	Win	7–0	Grzegorz Semik	TKO	2 (6), 1:24	10 Jun 2016	York Hall, London, England	
6	Win	6–0	Tzvetozar Iliev	TKO	2 (6), 2:40	30 Apr 2016	Copper Box Arena, London, England	
5	Win	5–0	David Sipos	TKO	1 (6), 2:53	25 Mar 2016	York Hall, London, England	
4	Win	4–0	Curtis Gargano	TKO	1 (4), 1:35	19 Dec 2015	Manchester Arena, Manchester, England	
3	Win	3–0	Tamas Danko	TKO	1 (4), 1:40	30 Oct 2015	Harrow Leisure Centre, London, England	
2	Win	2–0	Stanislavs Makarenko	PTS	4	12 Jun 2015	York Hall, London, England	
1	Win	1–0	Mitch Mitchell	KO	2 (4), 0:15	9 May 2015	The SSE Arena Wembley, London, England	

Sporting positions
Regional boxing titles
Preceded by Chris Hobbs	Southern Area light-heavyweight champion 20 May 2017 – November 2018; Vacated	Vacant Title next held by Andre Stirling
Preceded by Richard Baranyi	WBO European light-heavyweight champion 8 July 2017 – December 2018; Vacated	Vacant Title next held by Emil Markic
Vacant Title last held by Dominic Boesel	WBO Inter-Continental light-heavyweight champion 16 September 2017 – 24 August 2019; Failed to win world title	Vacant Title next held by Eleider Álvarez
Preceded by Lyndon Arthur	WBO Inter-Continental light-heavyweight champion 4 December 2021 – 28 January 2023; Failed to win world title	Vacant Title next held by Juan Carrillo
Preceded by Lyndon Arthur	Commonwealth light-heavyweight champion 4 December 2021 – December 2022; Vacated	Vacant Title next held by Dan Azeez
