= Liam Cameron =

English boxer (born 1990)

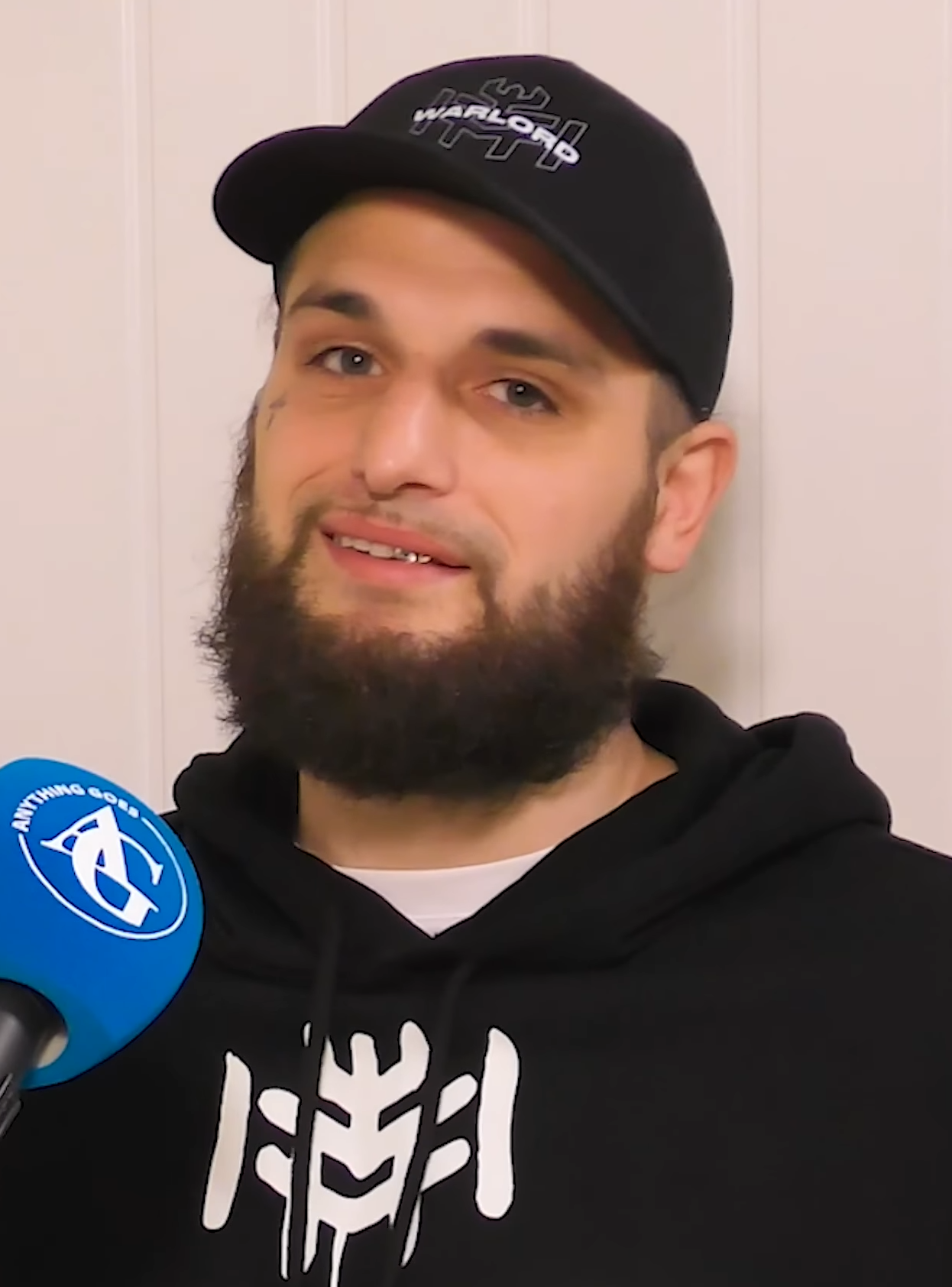
- Cameron in 2024

Personal information
- Nicknames: Cannonball, Cobbleman, Sheffield Beterbiev
- Nationality: English
- Born: 21 October 1990 (age 36) Sheffield, Yorkshire, England
- Height: 6 ft (183 cm)
- Weight: Middleweight; Super-middleweight; Light Heavyweight

Boxing career
- Stance: Orthodox

Boxing record
- Total fights: 34
- Wins: 24
- Win by KO: 10
- Losses: 8
- Draws: 1
- No contests: 1
Medal record
Men's amateur boxing
Representing England
English National Championships
| Gold medal – first place | 2009 Sheffield | Welterweight |
British National Championships
| Gold medal – first place | 2009 Liverpool | Welterweight |

Liam Cameron (born 21 October 1990) is an English professional boxer. He held the Commonwealth middleweight title from 2017 to 2018 and challenged twice for the super-middleweight version between 2015 and 2016.

== Professional career ==
Cameron made his professional debut on 24 October 2009, scoring a six-round points decision (PTS) victory over Matt Scriven at the City Hall in Sheffield.

After compiling a record of 9–0 (3 KOs) he suffered his first defeat at the hands of Erick Ochieng, losing via PTS (77–74) on 28 May 2011 at the Hillsborough Leisure Centre in Sheffield. He bounced back from defeat with three wins, one by knockout (KO), before suffering a second defeat on 23 June 2012, losing to Jez Wilson by PTS (97–95) for the vacant Central Area middleweight title at the Don Valley Stadium, Sheffield. After three more wins, one by technical knockout (TKO), he faced Rod Smith for the vacant International Masters middleweight title on 13 December 2013 at IceSheffield, losing by PTS (96–95) over ten rounds.

Following the third defeat of his career, he faced Wayne Reed on 10 May 2014 at the Octagon Centre in Sheffield. Cameron won his first professional title, defeating Reed via unanimous decision (UD) over ten rounds to capture the vacant IBO Youth super-middleweight title. One judge scored the bout 98–90 while the other two scored it 98–92.

After two more wins in non-title fights, including one stoppage by corner retirement (RTD), he faced Luke Blackledge for the vacant Commonwealth super-middleweight title on 4 April 2015 at the King George's Hall in Blackburn. Cameron lost by UD with the scorecards reading 117–112, 116–113 and 115–114. After a TKO win against Giorgi Beroshvili in October, Cameron was scheduled to face English super-middleweight champion, Jahmaine Smyle, on 29 May 2016. A week before the event, the bout was called off due to financial issues arising from low ticket sales. Following 13 months out of the ring due to the cancellation, he next fought on 25 November 2016 against Zac Dunn at The Flemington Pavilion in Melbourne, Australia. The fight would give Cameron a second attempt at the Commonwealth super-middleweight title after Blackledge vacated in favour of a British super-middleweight title fight. Cameron once again missed out on the title, losing via twelve-round UD with the scorecards reading 117–111, 116–112 and 115–113.

He moved down in weight for his next fight in a third attempt at a Commonwealth title, challenging Commonwealth middleweight champion, Sam Sheedy. Originally set to take place on 29 July, the bout was rescheduled to 13 October 2017, at the Ponds Forge Arena in Sheffield, after Sheedy suffered an injury during training. In an action-packed fight, Cameron scored three knockdowns with body shots in the fourth round, with Sheedy receiving a point deduction in the round for a head butt. Cameron scored another knockdown in the seventh, again from a body shot, with Sheedy also receiving a standing eight count after being on the receiving end of a barrage of punches from Cameron. The end came in the following round when the referee stepped in to call a halt to the contest to save Sheedy from further punishment, awarding Cameron the Commonwealth title via eighth-round TKO.

He was due to make the first defence of his title against Nicky Jenman on 24 April 2018 at IceSheffield, however, Jenman failed to make weight, prompting the Commonwealth Boxing Council (CBC) to withdraw its sanction for the fight. The bout went ahead regardless. Cameron knocked Jenman down in the second round. Jenman was able to make it back to his feet before the count of ten before referee Terry O'Connor waved the fight off, handing Cameron a second-round TKO victory.

Following his win over Jenman, it was announced in July that Cameron had failed a post-fight drug test for benzoylecgonine, a metabolite of cocaine, and was subsequently suspended by the British Boxing Board of Control (BBBofC) pending further investigation. Following the suspension, the CBC stripped Cameron of their title as he was unable to defend it against a mandatory challenger due to the suspension. The UK Anti-Doping (UKAD) agency found Cameron guilty of the anti-doping violation and imposed a four-year ban. He appealed the decision in October 2019, but was unsuccessful. Cameron confirmed his retirement after the ban was upheld, but resumed his career in 2023.

On 12 October 2024, Cameron challenged fellow British boxer Ben Whittaker for the IBF International light-heavyweight title on the undercard of Artur Beterbiev vs. Dmitry Bivol. During the bout both boxers became entangled as Cameron pushed Whittaker towards the ropes, resulting in them tumbling over and Whittaker being forced to withdraw due to injury. The fight subsequently went to the judges' scorecards, as per the rules of the British Boxing Board of Control, with both boxers receiving a 58–57 score respectively as well as a 58–58 score, resulting in a split decision technical draw. A rematch took place in Birmingham on 20 April 2025. Whittaker won by stoppage in the second round. The result has received some controversy as the referee did not do a standing 8 count and waved the fight off without a knockdown having occurred.

He beat Troy Jones by unanimous decision at Co-op Live Arena in Manchester on 1 November 2025.

He returned to Co-op Live Arena in Manchester to face Bradley Rea for the vacant WBA Inter-Continental light-heavyweight title on 9 May 2026. Cameron was floored twice in the fourth round with the referee stepping in to halt the fight after the second knockdown, handing his opponent the win by technical knockout.

== Professional boxing record ==
| 34 fights | 24 wins | 8 losses |
|---|---|---|
| By knockout | 10 | 2 |
| By decision | 14 | 6 |
| Draws | 1 | |
| No contests | 1 | |

| No. | Result | Record | Opponent | Type | Round, time | Date | Location | Notes |
|---|---|---|---|---|---|---|---|---|
| 34 | Loss | 24–8–1 (1) | Bradley Rea | TKO | 4 (10), 1:35 | 9 May 2026 | Co-op Live Arena, Manchester, England | Lost WBA Inter-Continental light-heavyweight title |
| 33 | Win | 24–7–1 (1) | Troy Jones | UD | 10 | 1 Nov 2025 | Co-op Live Arena, Manchester, England | Won vacant WBA Inter-Continental light-heavyweight title |
| 32 | Loss | 23–7–1 (1) | Benjamin Whittaker | TKO | 2 (10), 1:53 | 20 Apr 2025 | bp pulse LIVE, Birmingham, England | For IBF International light-heavyweight title |
| 31 | Draw | 23–6–1 (1) | Benjamin Whittaker | TD | 5 (10), 3:00 | 12 Oct 2024 | Kingdom Arena, Riyadh, Saudi Arabia | For IBF International and vacant WBO Global light-heavyweight titles; Whittaker was unable to continue due to an ankle injury when falling out of the ring |
| 30 | Loss | 23–6 (1) | Lyndon Arthur | SD | 10 | 21 Jun 2024 | Bolton Whites Hotel, Bolton, England | For vacant WBA Inter-Continental light heavyweight title |
| 29 | Win | 23–5 (1) | Hussein Itaba | TKO | 1 (6), 2:32 | 23 Mar 2024 | Sheffield Arena, Sheffield, England | |
| 28 | Win | 22–5 (1) | Harry Matthews | KO | 1 (6), 2:59 | 9 Feb 2024 | Park Community Arena, Sheffield, England | |
| 27 | Win | 21–5 (1) | Robbie Connor | PTS | 6 | 6 Oct 2023 | Park Community Arena, Sheffield, England | |
| 26 | NC | 20–5 (1) | Nicky Jenman | NC | 2 (12), 3:00 | 27 Apr 2018 | IceSheffield, Sheffield, England | Retained Commonwealth middleweight title; Originally TKO win for Cameron, changed to NC after he tested positive for cocaine |
| 25 | Win | 20–5 | Sam Sheedy | TKO | 8 (12), 0:40 | 13 Oct 2017 | Ponds Forge Arena, Sheffield, England | Won Commonwealth middleweight title |
| 24 | Loss | 19–5 | Zac Dunn | UD | 12 | 25 Nov 2016 | The Flemington Pavilion, Melbourne, Australia | For vacant Commonwealth super-middleweight title |
| 23 | Win | 19–4 | Giorgi Beroshvili | TKO | 4 (10), 2:11 | 17 Oct 2015 | Magna Centre, Rotherham, England | |
| 22 | Loss | 18–4 | Luke Blackledge | UD | 12 | 4 Apr 2015 | King George's Hall, Blackburn, England | For vacant Commonwealth super-middleweight title |
| 21 | Win | 18–3 | Tobias Webb | UD | 10 | 13 Dec 2014 | Hillsborough Leisure Centre, Sheffield, England | |
| 20 | Win | 17–3 | Philip Kotey | RTD | 4 (10), 3:00 | 13 Sep 2014 | Octagon Centre, Sheffield, England | |
| 19 | Win | 16–3 | Wayne Reed | UD | 10 | 10 May 2014 | Octagon Centre, Sheffield, England | Won vacant IBO Youth super-middleweight title |
| 18 | Loss | 15–3 | Rod Smith | PTS | 10 | 13 Dec 2013 | IceSheffield, Sheffield, England | For vacant International Masters middleweight title |
| 17 | Win | 15–2 | Zahari Mutafchiev | PTS | 4 | 14 Sep 2013 | Magna Centre, Rotherham, England | |
| 16 | Win | 14–2 | Harry Matthews | PTS | 6 | 17 May 2013 | Ponds Forge Arena, Sheffield, England | |
| 15 | Win | 13–2 | Paul Morby | TKO | 1 (6), 1:10 | 15 Dec 2012 | Octagon Centre, Sheffield, England | |
| 14 | Loss | 12–2 | Jez Wilson | PTS | 10 | 23 Jun 2012 | Don Valley Stadium, Sheffield, England | For Central Area middleweight title |
| 13 | Win | 12–1 | Harry Matthews | PTS | 6 | 3 Mar 2012 | Hillsborough Leisure Centre, Sheffield, England | |
| 12 | Win | 11–1 | Terry Carruthers | PTS | 6 | 29 Oct 2011 | Doncaster Dome, Doncaster, England | |
| 11 | Win | 10–1 | Costas Osben | KO | 2 (4), 1:05 | 3 Sep 2011 | Doncaster Dome, Doncaster, England | |
| 10 | Loss | 9–1 | Erick Ochieng | PTS | 8 | 28 May 2011 | Hillsborough Leisure Centre, Sheffield, England | |
| 9 | Win | 9–0 | Jason Ball | TKO | 1 (8), 1:55 | 30 Apr 2011 | Don Valley Stadium, Sheffield, England | |
| 8 | Win | 8–0 | Lester Walsh | TKO | 4 (6), 2:42 | 22 Jan 2011 | Doncaster Dome, Doncaster, England | |
| 7 | Win | 7–0 | Zahari Mutafchiev | PTS | 6 | 10 Dec 2010 | Don Valley Stadium, Sheffield, England | |
| 6 | Win | 6–0 | Ryan Clark | PTS | 4 | 9 Oct 2010 | Hotel de France, Saint Helier, Jersey | |
| 5 | Win | 5–0 | Dee Mitchell | PTS | 4 | 2 Jul 2010 | Doncaster Dome, Doncaster, England | |
| 4 | Win | 4–0 | Alex Spitko | TKO | 3 (4), 1:00 | 23 Apr 2010 | Skydome, Coventry, England | |
| 3 | Win | 3–0 | Kevin McCauley | PTS | 6 | 20 Feb 2010 | City Hall, Sheffield, England | |
| 2 | Win | 2–0 | Ryan Clark | PTS | 6 | 20 Dec 2009 | Octagon Centre, Sheffield, England | |
| 1 | Win | 1–0 | Matt Scriven | PTS | 6 | 24 Oct 2009 | City Hall, Sheffield, England | |

Sporting positions
Regional boxing titles
| Preceded by Sam Sheedy | Commonwealth middleweight champion 13 October 2017 – 13 August 2018; Stripped | Vacant Title next held by Felix Cash |
Minor world boxing titles
| Vacant Title last held by Gevorg Khatchikian | IBO Youth super-middleweight champion 10 May 2014 – September 2014 | Vacant Title next held by Bilal Akkawy |
