= Mark Nelson (boxing referee) =

American boxer

Mark Nelson is a professional boxing referee from St. Paul, Minnesota. Nelson is licensed by the WBO, WBA, and IBF, and has been appointed to officiate over 100 world title fights.
