= Jarrell Miller =

American boxer

- Born: July 15, 1988 (age 38); Brooklyn, New York, U.S.
- Nickname: Big Baby
- Height: 6 ft 4 in (193 cm)
- Division: Heavyweight
- Reach: 78 in (198 cm)
- Years active: 2006–2014 (Kickboxing); 2009–present (Boxing)

Professional boxing record
- Total: 31
- Wins: 28
- By knockout: 22
- Losses: 1
- By knockout: 1
- Draws: 2

Kickboxing record
- Total: 24
- Wins: 22
- By knockout: 10
- Losses: 2

Jarrell Miller (born July 15, 1988) is an American professional boxer and former kickboxer. In boxing, at regional level, he held the NABA and NABO heavyweight titles from 2016 to 2017. He holds notable wins over former world champions Tomasz Adamek and Lucas Browne. In kickboxing, he competed in the WCL, K-1, and Glory.

== Early life ==
Miller was born and raised in Brooklyn, New York. His mother is of Belizean and Irish descent, his father is of Haitian and Dominican descent. He took up Boxing at the age of 14, as a way to defend himself after being attacked on the street. He began Muay Thai at the age of 16. Miller has highlighted some of his early boxing idols, including Mike Tyson and Riddick Bowe.

== Amateur career ==
As an amateur boxer, Miller reached the final of the 2007 New York Golden Gloves Heavyweight tournament at the Madison Square Garden in New York, where he lost to Tor Hamer on points (4–1). Miller had an amateur record of 10–1, with 7 wins by knockout. Miller had a limited amateur career due to him being forced to turn professional as he was also a professional kickboxer.

== Professional boxing career ==
=== Early career ===
Miller made his professional boxing debut at the age of 21 on July 18, 2009, at the Plattduetsche Park Restaurant, in Franklin Square, New York. His opponent was an experienced 36-year-old Darius Whitson in a scheduled 4-round bout. Miller won the fight by TKO in the first round due to the ring doctor stopping the match because of a cut Darius Whitson received from an accidental headbutt. After a 22-month break from boxing, in May 2011, Miller defeated Isaac Villanueva via third-round TKO at the Roseland Ballroom in Manhattan.

Miller took another gap from boxing for 11 months, returning to the ring in April 2012 at the Cordon Bleu in Woodhaven, New York, against American boxer Donnie Crawford, stopping him 2 minutes and 38 seconds of round one. In December of that year, Miller defeated 36-year-old Tyrone Gibson at the Roseland Ballroom.

On January 19, 2013, Miller was in a scheduled 4-round bout against 22-year-old up-and-comer Joey Dawejko (7–1–1, 3 KOs) at the Mohegan Sun Casino in Uncasville, Connecticut. The fight went the full 4 rounds and was ruled as a draw on all scorecards 37–37, 3 times. Miller was deducted 2 points for pushing during the fight.

In September 2013, Miller defeated Tobias Rice, when Rice failed to come out for round 3. Two months later, Miller knocked out 34-year-old Willie Chisolm in 2 rounds. In December, Miller fought 39-year-old southpaw Sylvester Barron (8–2, 3 KOs). Miller outclassed Barron in the scheduled 6-round fight, knocking him down once in round 1 and again in round 2 before referee Benjy Esteves Jr. stopped the fight. In January 2014, Miller fought at the Harrah's Philadelphia in Chester, Pennsylvania, against Jon Hill (6–4, 5 KOs), winning the fight via technical knockout in round 4.

On May 5, Miller fought at the Millennium Theater in Brighton Beach, New York, against Joshua Harris, who was a last-minute replacement moving up from cruiserweight. Miller, who weighed in 50 pounds heavier, knocked out and stopped Harris inside 2 rounds. Miller was originally scheduled to fight Vincent Thompson, who had been arrested before the event for his role in six armed bank robberies. This win ensured Miller would qualify for a vacant ten-round New York State Heavyweight title showdown against Derric Rossy.

Miller next fought in November against Rodricka Ray in a scheduled 6-round fight. Miller won via unanimous decision with the judges scoring in his favor 60–54, 59–55, and 59–55. On January 1, 2015, Miller fought in California for the first time since turning professional. His opponent was 35-year-old Aaron Kinch. The fight went a full 6 rounds as Miller won a shut out decision 60–54, 60–54, and 60–53.

Raymond Ochieng (26–18–3, 21 KOs) called out Miller following his win over David Rodriguez in 2014. Miller accepted and they faced off in April 2015. Miller won via first-round TKO. Miller next had a scheduled fight on June 4 against 41-year-old Damon McCreary (15–4, 11 KOs). Miller won the bout via 2nd round stoppage after Miller gave McCreary a beating, until he slumped through the bottom ropes, falling through helpless and defenseless in a sitting position. Miller had two more bouts in 2015, finishing the year strong, stopping Excell Holmes and Akhror Muralimov inside the distance.

=== Rise up the ranks ===
Miller had his first fight of 2016 on January 23 at the Casino Del Sol in Tucson, Arizona, for the interim WBA-NABA heavyweight title against Donovan Dennis (12–2, 10 KOs). Miller defeated Dennis when the fight was called by the referee at 2:31 of the 7th round. In the post-fight interview, Miller called out then IBF champion Charles Martin, WBC champion Deontay Wilder, Unified world champion Anthony Joshua. Miller took full distinction as NABA champion on February 1, after Shannon Briggs was stripped of the title.

It was announced that Miller, who was now ranked WBO #11, WBA #12 and IBF #15, would next fight on May 27, at the Seneca Niagara Resort & Casino in Niagara Falls, New York against Nick Guivas (12–3–2, 9 KOs) for the vacant WBO NABO Heavyweight title, previously held by Charles Martin. Miller kept his unbeaten run intact as he knocked out the over-matched Guivas in the 2nd-round. Miller used power shots to the body of Guivas to knock him down four times in the fight, with two of the knockdowns coming in the 1st round. Referee Dick Pakozdi stopped the fight officially at 1:26 of the 2nd round with Miller claiming the vacant title. In the post-fight interview, Miller again called out top heavyweights Wladimir Klitschko, Tyson Fury, Anthony Joshua and Deontay Wilder.

Salita Promotions announced that Miller would be fighting on the main event of ShoBox: The New Generation on August 19 at the outdoor Rhinos Stadium in Rochester, New York. His opponent would be his toughest test to date, seasoned veteran Fred Kassi (18–5–1, 10 KOs). Miller, determined to stop Kassi inside the distance, said, "I'm ready to put his lights out like I do everybody else. I know he's durable and a little older than me. He's a tough guy and he can take a beating. So far, he's only been stopped once. I'll be the second." Miller weighed in his heaviest at 296.5 pounds since turning pro. The fight only lasted three rounds, with Miller coming out on top. After the third round, Kassi complained that he had injured his right hand and did not come out for the 4th round. Kassi started well in the opening round, connecting his shots, but ultimately became a punch bag for the remainder of the fight leaning against the ropes while Miller unloaded with body shots. Miller showed off his aggressive style by stopping Kassi.

In September 2016, Miller accused his promoter of breaching their contract. Although nothing was disclosed, rumours surfaced it was because of Miller's recent fight purses where he stated he had been underpaid. Miller started making noise in December 2016 when new WBO heavyweight champion Joseph Parker listed him as a potential first defence along with British boxers Hughie Fury and David Price. The news initially came when the WBO stated Parker could make a voluntary defence after mandatory challenger David Haye decided to take up a grudge match against fellow Brit Tony Bellew. Only fighting twice in 2016, Miller said that he was looking for the right opportunity. Miller started calling out Joseph Parker, saying he would fight him anywhere.

==== Miller vs. Washington, Wach ====
On June 27, 2017, it was announced that Miller would fight former world title challenger Gerald Washington (18–1–1, 12 KOs) on the undercard of Garcia-Broner at the Barclays Center in New York on July 25 in a 10-round bout, this was Miller's first fight back after an 11-month layoff. Miller weighed in a career high 298.8 pounds while Washington weighed 248 pounds, 9 pounds heavier than when he challenged Wilder for the WBC title in February 2017. After the weigh in, the face off was tense as Miller was trash-talking Washington, who never did any trash-talking back. Miller then threw his promotional cap towards Washington as the face off was broken up. Miller broke down Washington over 8 rounds eventually forcing the corner and referee stopping the fight. Washington had a good opening round, but Miller took control landing power shots and causing heavy punishment. Washington suffered his second consecutive stoppage loss. Stephen Espinoza, Showtime Sports general manager praised Miller and said he could soon feature on 'Showtime Championship Boxing'. Miller spoke with Showtime after the fight and called Washington a warrior, "I knew there would be a give and take in this fight. It's one thing to fight when you have stamina; it's another to fight when you're tired. I was trying to out-think him [...] Gerald was very tough. It was a very good fight that had me thinking. My power was there. I took the hard way back coming in off of a layoff. Gerald definitely pushed me and motivated me. I had to rely on my brain and my power." Miller received a $70,000 purse for the win, while Washington earned $50,000.

On September 24, 2017 HBO announced that Miller would appear as a co-feature alongside fellow New York fighter Daniel Jacobs on a card which would take place on November 11 at the Nassau Veterans Memorial Coliseum in Uniondale, New York. This would be the second event at the Coliseum since it re-opened in July 2017. Prior to that date, no event had taken place there since 1986. A day later it was revealed that 37 year old former world title challenger Mariusz Wach (33–2, 17 KOs) would be Miller's opponent for his HBO debut. Miller weighed 283.4 pounds, showing that he had lost weight rather than gain more, as he had done in his last two fights. Wach weighed a career-high 268 pounds, also making him the heaviest opponent Miller had fought. Miller defeated Wach by TKO in the ninth round, moving him closer to a potential world title fight. Miller had a tougher time than expected as Wach pressured him many times. The fight was stopped by the referee and Wach's corner during the ninth round due to Wach suffering a hand injury. The injury had been a problem for Wach from the early rounds but seemed to get worse to the point where Wach was no longer using his right hand from round 7, other than for just an occasional shot. With the injury, Wach was unable to hold back Miller. The ringside doctor ended the fight at 1:02 of round nine.

In the post fight interview, Miller said, "The next fight on the table for me that makes sense is Dillian Whyte or Joseph Parker. Those 2 fights make sense to me, because who are they fighting? Parker fought Hughie Fury, who I know didn't deserve a title shot. Whyte is not a mandatory [for WBC champion Deontay Wilder]. I think Dillian Whyte should come and fight me. I'd be a good fight, and then the winner of that gets AJ or Deontay." Talking about Wach, he said, "He hit me with a couple of shots, and it hurt me. The main thing was to try and stay on his chest. I gave myself a rating of an F, because it wasn't my best performance and I was lighter. For the fight, Miller landed 204 of 620 punches thrown (33%), whilst Wach landed 95 of 328 (29%). Miller's debut on HBO averaged 673,000 viewers and peaked at 739,000 viewers.

==== Miller vs. Duhaupas ====
On January 24, 2018 according to an interview with Sky Sports, Miller stated his intention to fight fellow New York boxer Trevor Bryan (19–0, 13 KOs) on April 28 at the Barclays Center in New York on HBO. Miller believed he should be next in line for a world title fight. Speaking to The Ring, he said, "Yes, we are working on Trevor Bryan, but his promoter is Don King, who is not the easiest to work with." A deal was not reached and on February 6, ESPN reported that Miller would instead fight 37 year old French contender and former world title challenger Johann Duhaupas (37–4, 24 KOs) as part of a doubleheader including Daniel Jacobs vs. Maciej Sulęcki, at the Barclays Center, in Brooklyn, New York on April 28, live on HBO. Duhaupas was ranked #7 by the WBA, #8 by the WBC and #13 by the IBF at heavyweight. At the weight in, Miller came in at 304 1/4 pounds, which was 21 pounds heavier than what he weighed for his previous fight. Duhaupas weighed 244.2 pounds. 7,892 fans attended the event. On fight night, going the 12 round distance for the first time as a professional, Miller outworked Duhaupas in a one-sided fight winning with the scores of 119–109, 119–109, and 117–111. Miller was mostly the aggressor, not allowing Duhaupas to get much offence in. Duhaupas landed clean occasionally when he did let his hands go. Miller landed 261 of 782 total punches (33.4%), 185 being power punches, compared to Duhaupas' 128 landed of his 538 (23.8%), with 67 being power shots. It was said that with the win, Miller became the WBA mandatory challenger. After the fight, Miller stated he wanted Joshua to fight him in Brooklyn. The fight averaged 706,000 viewers and peaked at 834,000 on HBO.

On June 16, 2018, the IBF ordered a final eliminator between Miller and Kubrat Pulev (25–1, 13 KOs), with a purse bid taking place on June 25. The winner would become the mandatory challenger to Anthony Joshua's IBF belt. At the purse bid, Epic Sports & Entertainment made the winning bid of $2,111,111, much higher than the $1,000,010, which was placed by Team Sauerland. The bid meant Miller would be earning his highest purse at $527,777.75 US dollars. According to Epic Sports, the contracts were sent within two days of the purse bid. By 2 July, there was no deal made. It was said that Miller's camp were stalling, likely due to the fight taking place in Bulgaria. Miller's promoter Dmitry Salita confirmed negotiations were still ongoing however the biggest hurdle was the venue. According to IBF public relations director Jeanette Salazar, Miller had 15 days from when he received the contract to agree or the IBF would go back to the rankings. At the time, the next highest challenger was Hughie Fury, who was inserted at #5 by the IBF in June. Negotiations between Pulev and Miller broke down on July 10.

==== Miller vs. Adamek, Dinu ====
On August 2, 2018, former two weight world champion Tomasz Adamek (53–5, 31 KOs) spoke of his interest to fight Miller after it was announced that Miller's next fight was scheduled in Chicago, a town with a big Polish community. Artur Szpilka was also a name mentioned however there was reports stating he would fight Mariusz Wach. According to ESPN's Dan Rafael and others close to Hearn, the fight was a mismatch. The fight was later announced to take place at a 10,000 capacity Wintrust Arena in Chicago on October 6, 2018. Miller stayed in contention for a world title fight after knocking out Adamek in round 2. Miller weighed his career-heaviest at 317 pounds compared to Adamek who weighed 227 pounds. Miller knocked Adamek down after hurting him with a left and then landing a number of power shots to put him down on one knee. Adamek was given a count by the referee and decided not to get back to his feet. In round 1, Miller stalked Adamek around the ring, hitting him with hard body and head shots. Adamek was unable to keep a distance.

Knowing he would likely not get a shot at Anthony Joshua in April 2019, Miller's handlers focused their attention on the WBA 'regular' belt. At the time, the titleholder Manuel Charr was going through a failed drugs test, as the belt was not yet vacant, Greg Cohen, Miller's co-promoter stated he would likely fight 45 year old boxer Fres Oquendo or WBA 'interim' champion Trevor Bryan. On October 19, terms were agreed for Miller to challenge Oquendo (37–8, 24 KOs), for the soon-to-be vacant WBA 'regular' belt on November 17 at the Boardwalk Hall in Atlantic City, New Jersey. Oquendo, last fought in 2014, was legally owed a WBA 'regular' title opportunity after winning a lawsuit on the back of his loss against then belt-holder Ruslan Chagaev. On October 24, ESPN reported, Oquendo, who would have earned $500,000 in fighting Miller, turned down the fight as there would no be 'enough time to properly implement Voluntary Anti-Doping Association testing for performance-enhancing drugs'. Romania boxer Bogdan Dinu accepted fight Miller on the same date. Dinu was ranked #9 by the WBA and #13 by the IBF at heavyweight. A press conference two days later confirmed the card would take place at the Kansas Star Arena and Casino in Mulvane, Kansas. Top Rank's Bob Arum stated he would write a letter to the WBA informing them Bryant Jennings would be available and not skipped. At the time, Jennings was ranked #7 by WBA ahead of Dinu, who was ranked #9. Miller weighed 315 1/4 pounds, 78 pounds more than Dinu, who came in at 237 1/4 pounds. After making a pre-fight prediction that he would win the fight inside 5 rounds, Miller knocked Dinu down and out for the 10-count in round 4 of their scheduled 12-round bout. The fight marked Miller's second win in 6 weeks. The opening 3 rounds where competitive. Dinu was able to land his jab, but backed off a little after he felt Miller's power. After the fight, Miller stated he wanted to fight a British boxer in 2019. Over the 4 rounds, Miller landed 54 punches of 204 thrown (27%), this included 35 power shots and Dinu landed 69 of 240 punches thrown (29%), which included 39 jabs landed.

=== Cancelled fights due to failed drug tests ===
==== Miller vs. Joshua ====
Miller was announced as Anthony Joshua's next opponent in February 2019, and was due to challenge for Joshua's WBA (Super), IBF, WBO, and IBO heavyweight titles at Madison Square Garden in June 2019. Prior to the scheduled fight, Miller tested positive for GW501516, causing the New York State Athletic Commission (NYSAC) to deny him a license to box. Further tests proved positive for EPO and HGH. Miller was dropped from the card. Because he was not licensed at the time, the NYSAC could not take disciplinary action for the failed tests, beyond denying the application for a license. The WBA, however, imposed a six-month ban and removed Miller from their rankings. The ruling did not necessarily mean Miller could not box during that time as he could, in theory, have applied for a license in another state (due to not receiving a suspension by the NYSAC). But any fight scheduled would not have been sanctioned by the WBA.

==== Miller vs. Forrest ====
On October 31, 2019, it was reported that Miller was on the verge of a comeback and close to signing a co-promotional deal with Bob Arum's Top Rank Inc, which meant he would appear on ESPN going forward. On January 22, 2020, a multi-fight deal was complete Miller's co-promoters Dmitriy Salita and Greg Cohen handling the negotiations. A month prior, Miller also signed up with well known sports manager James Prince, who also helped move the deal over the line. Eddie Hearn revealed Miller wanting to sign with Matchroom Boxing ahead of his return, but Hearn could not offer him a deal due to the previous positive drug tests. Hearn wished him well.

Following the suspension by the WBA, on June 16, 2020, it was announced that Miller was scheduled to make his ring return against Jerry Forrest (26–3, 20 KOs) on July 9, at the MGM Grand Conference Center in Paradise, Nevada. On June 27, it was reported that Miller had yet again failed a pre-fight drug test, returning positive results for the banned substance GW501516. He was expected to be suspended the following week. Forrest still fought on the card and instead fought Carlos Takam in the main event. WBC President Mauricio Sulaiman told Sky Sports that Miller failed to enrol in their Clean Boxing Program, multiple times, which meant he could not get ranked by them.

Miller spoke on the failed test:

"I have never, ever willingly taken a steroid for performance-enhancing purposes. Did I take something for healing properties, for injuries? Yes, I have. But to win a fight and during a training camp? No, I have never done that.

"Nobody can be more outraged [of the allegations] than me. I'm the one that's lost millions of dollars. I'm the one that's had his career on the line. ... But I have to think about it with a straight mind. I have to figure it out. Sit down with my team. Get everything in order and get everything done in the right way … It's sad. I'm angry about it, but like I said, there is an explanation for it, and me and my legal team are working on it."

"I should not be banned [for life]. I'm prepared to accept my suspension and be willing to do my monthly testing [during] my suspension, but to be banned for life? You're out of your mind … I've done my research and homework to do my best to not make this happen, and all I can do is apologize to Bob Arum, apologize to Jay [Prince] But at the same time, I did do my homework. I did put my best foot forward. I did let VADA know of certain circumstances. I did my part as a human being and as a fighter."

Miller later stated it was a sexual performance pill he took which caused the failed test. Miller received a suspension by the Nevada Athletic Commission (NAC) on July 2, with the suspension being extended on August 5 by an NAC five-member panel at their monthly commission hearing. On December 2, Miller was formally given a 24-month backdated ban by the Nevada State Athletic Commission. The five-member panel voted unanimously. Miller was given the option to reduce his ban by six months. The ban meant Miller could not return to the ring until January 2022. On December 31, 2020, Miller started random drug testing via the NSAC. He posted a video showing himself with a cup, in which he would deposit his urine sample.

=== Return to the ring ===
On October 13, 2021, Miller announced that he had resumed training. He also confirmed that he was now training in South Florida with world class trainer Kevin Cunningham. Miller was planning a return to the ring in 2022. On March 23, 2022, a five-member panel voted unanimously to allow Miller to be eligible for a license from June 17, 2022. The proposal was from commissioner Anthony A. Marnell III to stated, "The ball is in your court. You will serve out the 24 months. It's 100% on you to determine what you do here." As long as Miller kept producing clean test results.

On May 15, it was announced a date had been set for Miller to headline a Triller Fight Club card on June 25 against Nigerian Onoriode Ehwarieme (20–2, 19 KOs) at the Kia Forum in Inglewood, California. The fight was cancelled and Miller instead attended the WBA KO Drugs Festival on June 23 at the Casino Buenos Aires in Argentina, where he was scheduled to fight journeyman Ariel Esteban Bracamonte (11–7, 6 KOs). Bracamonte was coming off a decision loss to Demsey McKean in February 2022. After 43-months out of the ring, Miller won the 10-round fight via unanimous decision. Miller weighed 341 ¾-pounds and the ring rust showed during the fight. There was little action until round 3, where Miller found his timing and started being more aggressive. Bracamonte began to throw less. The action was paused in round 4, due to a punch from Miller which landed below the belt. He was given a warning. Both traded shots in the last round. All three judges scored the same 97-92 for Miller.

On July 15, Miller announced he would return to the ring in the United States, marking his first fight in 3 years against Derek Cardenas (8–9, 7KOs) on July 23, at the Embassy Suites hotel in Murfreesboro, Tennessee. Miller weighed much lighter than his previous bout, weighing in at 328 pounds, whilst his opponent weighed a career-heavy 269 pounds. Miller dropped Cardenas three times, stopping him in round 4. Miller worked the jab in round 1. The first knockdown occurred in round 3 when Cardenas took a knee following a left hook to the body. A right uppercut in round 4 knocked Cardenas down again. Cardenas beat the count, only to go down a 3rd and final time as referee Daniel Ziemba stopped the fight. Miller wanted to fight once a month before the end of the year.

On October 16, Miller's next bout was announced. A fight was scheduled to take place in Dar-es- Salam, Tanzania, on November 4, against Awadh "Big Brother" Tamim. The fight however did not eventuate. On November 1, according to Dmitriy Salita, the Nevada State Athletic Commission lifted Miller's suspension and licensed him. This meant he could now fight in Las Vegas and other US states.

==== Miller vs. Browne ====
Miller's next fight was announced by promoter Anatoly Sulyanov of Hardcore Boxing, to take place on March 18, 2023, against former WBA regular heavyweight champion Lucas Browne. The event billed as "Hardcore Boxing in Dubai", was to take place at Agenda Arena in Dubai, United Arab Emirates with Miller-Browne as the main event. In what was his first meaningful fight in over 4 years, Miller worked hard and stopped Browne in round 6 following a knockdown. Browne beat the referees count, but Miller came on strong and unloaded a barrage of power shots forcing the referee to intervene and stop the bout. After the fight, Miller, speaking to Tyrone Woodley called out Joshua, claiming they have unfinished business, relating to their fight being cancelled, "I want [Daniel] Dubois or I want AJ. We got unfinished business. You know, he gotta be a man and step up to the plate. He can't have his balls in his pocket. If he want the fight, let's make it happen. He want an easy win. He fighting Jermaine Franklin coming off a loss, which I thought he beat Dillian Whyte. So AJ, let's get it on. Stop being a p-ssy. You know what I mean? Straight up."

In September 2023, following a settlement, the WBA reinstated Mahmoud Charr as their regular world champion and ordered Charr to make a defence against Miller. According to BILD, a few days later, the fight talks were at an advanced stage and planned to take place in Nigeria in October. A month later, due to financial reasons, the fight was cancelled.

==== Miller vs. Dubois ====
In November 2023, Riyadh Season announced a blockbuster card which would take place on December 23, 2023, with Anthony Joshua vs. Otto Wallin as the headline. One of the undercard bouts announced was Miller making his second appearance of the year against British heavyweight contender Daniel Dubois. Dubois was on a comeback trial after failing to de-crown unified champion Oleksandr Usyk in August. Just days before the event, a video surfaced online showing Miller taking the Shahada thus converting to Islam. Miller weighed in at 333 pounds, nearly 100 pounds more than Dubois, who came in at 239 pounds. Dubois put on a show and likely the most entertaining victory on the card, stopping Miller in the tenth round. Dubois seemed anxious early on from the pressure which was being applied by Miller, but as the rounds went by, Dubois picked his shots and landed heavy punishment on Miller. By the tenth round, Dubois was in control and landing power shots. Miller stood and took the punishment before the referee stopped the fight with only 10 seconds of the round left. Both boxers embraced at the end of the fight. Dubois said the confidence which was missing had come back after this fight. Speaking to DAZN after the fight, he said, "It really mattered tonight. I had to dig deep. I came through it and I showed my heart." Dubois landed a career-high 208 punches on Miller, which was a 40% connect rate. Miller only connected 107 of his 379 punches thrown.

Following the loss to Dubois, Miller said he would get active and in better shape. He was prepared for longer training camps. His trainer also said he would need to shed some weight to be considered amongst the top heavyweight contenders. The weight he was aiming for was ideally between 285 and 300 pounds. Sosa believed Miller was never hurt during his loss to Dubois, rather he was fatigued.

==== Miller vs. Ruiz Jr ====
On April 24, 2024, a press conference was held at the Gotham Hall in Los Angeles to announce Riyadh Season's debut card in the United States, which was to take place on August 3 at the BMO Stadium in Los Angeles. The headline was Terence Crawford vs. Israil Madrimov in a super welterweight title fight. Miller was announced for the card, in a crossroads fight against former unified heavyweight champion Andy Ruiz Jr. in a 12-round heavyweight co-feature bout. There was no trash talk from Miller towards Ruiz. Instead, Miller said he would go for a pint after the fight is over. For Miller, the fight was not personal, however he stated that he would make Ruiz pay, for replacing him and taking his purse against Joshua. Miller weighed 305.6 pounds, however according to California State Athletic Commission, was 312 pounds on fight night. Ruiz weighed 274.4 pounds, and gained a pound before the fight took place.

The fight ended in a majority draw: one judge scored the bout 116–112 to Miller, but was overruled by the other two judges who scored it a 114–114 draw. Miller started slow, but after 3 rounds, Ruiz looked tired and did well to still go the distance. Miller was the more aggressive fighter and in control of the pace of the fight. He was pushing the action against Ruiz. Ruiz was limited in his offence, and Miller exploited this by piling on sustained pressure. During the last ten seconds of every round, Miller threw flurries. This was most likely a technique by Miller to take rounds in his favour, as he was not able to be active for the full 3 minutes of each round.

In his post-match interview, Miller asserted his opinion that he won the fight: "I know I did enough to win, I threw more punches. I had him backing up the entire fight. It's called effective aggression. I kept the pressure on and I hit him with the more effective punches. I had the fight in the bag." Fans on social media were also critical of scoring, felt Ruiz's career was saved by the judges. Speaking further on the result, Miller said, "That's boxing; sometimes you get robbed. I just want the fans to keep supporting me; I've been an underdog my whole life." Miller said he was against having judges from the West Coast for the bout. According to CompuBox, Miller landed 183 of his 514 punches thrown (35.6%) and Ruiz landed 113 of his 355 punches thrown (31.8%). Ruiz was more active during the first four rounds out-landing Miller 47–40. Miller landed double digits in every round from the third. Ruiz posted a picture of his injured right hand on social media, claiming it affected his performance. It was believed to have been injured in round 5.

=== Failed fight attempts ===
On October 17. 2024, Miller told BoxingScene that he would fight British heavyweight Derek Chisora (35–13, 23 KOs) at an arena in Manchester on February 8, 2025. He said, "That's the biggest one we're talking about right now – Chisora. It's not locked in yet; the deal's not signed yet. But there are definitely talks. In November, it was reported that Chisora would face Miller in Manchester, England on February 8, 2025. It was later announced that the fight against Miller fell through. Miller posted via his Instagram account it was Salita Promotions who caused the fight to fall apart after saying Chisora was ready to finalise. According to Miller, his contract with Salita Promotions had expired but said they exercised their first and last right of refusal. Salita later replied stating it was Miller who eventually turned down the fight. On November 27, Chisora was announced to fight 34 year old Swedish heavyweight Otto Wallin at Co-op Live in Manchester. Wallin, who was also promoted by Salita, was given the opportunity after Miller was dropped.

On April 4, 2025, Mike Coppinger of Ring Magazine reported a fight between British heavyweight Fabio Wardley (18–0–1, 17 KOs) and Miller was being finalised to take place at Portman Road stadium in Ipswich. Wardley, an Ipswich Town F.C. fan, also posted on social media, hinting a big announcement. The next day, Queensberry Promotions, along with Ipswich Town, officially announced the fight, which take place on June 7, 2025 on DAZN. Wardley was ranked #9 by Ring Magazine at the time. He revealed that Kubrat Pulev turned down a fight, after the WBA ordered Pulev to defend the WBA 'regular' title against Wardley. The fight was billed as 'Running Towards Adversity' and have the vacant interim WBA World Championship at stake. The press conference saw Miller appear at Portman Road wearing a rival Norwich City F.C. shirt in a bid to antagonise Wardley, with tempers flaring after Miller shoved his hand into Wardley’s face. Miller accused Wardley of creating a diss-track. On April 13, the BBBofC wrote to lead promoter Frank Warren, copying in the NYSAC, to advise they would be withholding a portion of Miller's purse for the bout. Miller was given a warning and would be closely monitored going forward until the fight. Miller did not respond well to the warning, and replied expletively. After a couple of days of whispers, Miller officially pulled out of the fight citing a shoulder injury he picked up in training camp. The card was still scheduled to ahead. On May 13, Miller confirmed that he had officially split with Salita Promotions and all further communications would be through his manager Spencer Brown. On August 8, Miller stated a potential fight with Jared Anderson had fallen through. He alleged there was a dispute between Anderson and his promoter Top Rank. Miller stated that Deontay Wilder was approached about the fight but declined due to past disrespect from Miller.

On August 10, terms were agreed for Miller to fight American highly-ranked contender Michael Hunter (24–1–2, 17 KOs) on September 11, 2025 in Las Vegas. The fight would headline an event in Las Vegas prior to the Canelo Álvarez vs. Terence Crawford event at Allegiant Stadium on September 13, 2025. Hunter was unbeaten as a heavyweight, winning 12 of his 14 fights. Within a day of the fight being announced, Don King filed a cease and desist order to the organisers to prevent the fighting taking place. In May 2025, King won a purse bid for $1,100,000, in order to promote WBA 'regular' champion Kubrat Pulev's defence against Hunter. In a statement, he said, “Hunter is under contract to Don King Productions and he’ll be fighting for a world championship.” At the same time it was revealed that Hunter released a formal legal declaration asserting his status as a free agent. Hunter alleged that DKP was in "material breach" due to a failure to respond to legal correspondence by April 27, thereby terminating any contractual obligations. On August 13, King announced Pulev vs. Hunter to take place on October 4 at Casino Miami in Florida. On August 21, Miller posted on his social media to confirm that the fight with Hunter would not take place. The WBA determined that Hunter was no longer in a mandatory position due to complications related to his promotion.

Miller emerged as a leading candidate to be Chisora's final opponent on December 13, 2025. Miller stated that he had signed contracts and was ready for the fight. However, on October 25, Chisora chose to fight Dillian Whyte (31–4, 21 KOs) in a trilogy match instead of Miller and other heavyweight contenders. He told Ring Magazine, “Chisora has been calling me for months, saying to stay in shape and that we were going to make it happen. We signed up for VADA, we signed the contract, everything was good to go and ready to clear, and all of a sudden, he didn't want to fight. He might know that his body is not ready for a Big Baby fight. Opportunities get missed, and they never come back sometimes. Chisora has earned the right to feel the way that he wants to. He's never been a person to back down from fights. I honestly don't know [why he had a change of heart]. I don't think he's scared of me. But I definitely think that he knows fighting me would be his last fight."

In November 2025, Miller was photographed with Eddie Hearn, suggesting an improvement in their relationship, despite being on opposing sides since 2019. In a post, Miller expressed gratitude towards Hearn, implying a potential significant development on the horizon.

=== Career from 2026 ===
==== Miller vs. Ibeh ====
In December 2025, Miller was announced to be part of 'The Ring 6’ event, which was scheduled to take place on January 31, 2026 at Madison Square Garden in New York. His opponent was to be Kingsley Ibeh (16–2–1, 14 KOs), who was on an 11-fight win streak, since his loss to Jared Anderson in February 2021. Miller won a split decision over Ibeh in a tough ten-round battle; however a dramatic hairpiece incident became the highlight of the night. Ibeh started the fight using sharp combinations, straight left hands and good movement. He was more active and tagged Miller occasionally, who struggled with the range. In the second round, one of Ibeh’s punches dislodged Miller’s toupee, which drew a notable crowd reaction. Miller removed it before the third round and tossed it into the audience. Miller increased his output from the fourth round, focusing on body shots and his size to back Ibeh against the ropes. The pressure gradually wore down Ibeh, though he still landed some power shots. Towards the final rounds, Miller was in control and Ibeh showed signs of fatigue. Miller’s consistent body attack further slowed Ibeh down, causing Ibeh to briefly touch the canvas in the seventh round. The judges scored the fight 97–93 twice for Miller, with one card in favor of Ibeh 96–94.

After Miller threw his toupee into the crowd, boxers Fabio Wardley and Skye Nicolson, who were sat ringside, posed with it in pictures uploaded to social media. Miller later stated in a post-fight interview that his hair was damaged by ammonium bleach, which he said he had inadvertently used while washing his hair.

==== Miller vs. Peró ====
On March 17, 2026, it was announced that Miller would headline a Matchroom Boxing card at the Fontainebleau Las Vegas, against WBA #2 ranked Lenier Peró (13–0, 8 KOs) on April 25. The event was streamed globally on DAZN. This was Pero's first 12-round fight and was also a WBA title eliminator bout. The fight came from a confrontation after Pero's unanimous decision victory against Jordan Thompson in November 2025, when they verbally agreed to fight each other in the future. During the launch press conference, Miller promised to return to the "old-school Big Baby style" which established his reputation in the past, while Pero stated that he would "put on a boxing clinic" and showcase the technical traditions of Cuban boxing. The fight was also Miller's opportunity to re-establish himself among the top contenders. Miller brought in Derrick "Bozy" Ennis, to work in his corner after working together previously in Miller's draw with Andy Ruiz. Miller remained his usual outspoken self during the final press conference, predicting a dominant victory and attempted to impose psychological pressure on Pero, who was not interested in any pre-fight rhetoric, stating that his performance in the ring would speak for itself. Pero's trainer, Bob Santos, believed that Miller was underestimating his fighter. Miller said, “I'm not taking him lightly, but I know what I’ve got to do, and I know what I can do, and that's what we're going to do.” Miller weighed 305 pounds and Pero much lighter at 251.4 pounds. Miller was 12 pounds lighter than when he fought Ibeh in his last fight and his lightest weight since 2018.

Miller defeated Pero by unanimous decision in what was a high-volume heavyweight contest, with 1,652 punches thrown combined. Pero had success earlier in the fight with power shots to the body. By the third round Miller changed his tactics and decided to fight at a close range, applying constant pressure. By the eighth round, Miller’s right hands were taking effect. Pero rallied in the ninth and eleventh rounds with body shots and hooks, but Miller continually regained control with forward pressure. The judges scored the bout 117–111, 117–111, and 115–113 in Miller's favour. In the post-fight, Miller said he had wanted to test his conditioning and "get back to throwing a lot of punches." Miller and Hearn then called for a fight against former world champion Deontay Wilder, who had just won a split decision over Derek Chisora in April. Miller landed 290 of his 1,003 punches thrown (29%) and Pero landed 253 of 648 punches (39%).

In August 2026, Eddie Hearn confirmed that negotiations were underway for Miller to challenge WBA champion Murat Gassiev (34–2, 27 KOs). Hearn was already considering future options for Miller, mentioning a possible fight with WBC champion Agit Kabayel (27–0, 19 KOs) if Miller was to defeat Gassiev. Hearn described Miller as 'our guy', hinting that Miller was now under a promotional contract with Matchroom. Gassiev later stated that he would be interested in fighting Miller.

== Exhibition bout ==
Jarrell Miller fought Antonio Zepeda in an exhibition match on June 11, 2023, on the undercard of Floyd Mayweather vs. John Gotti III.

== Kickboxing career ==
Miller began kickboxing at the age of 14. Miller had an amateur kickboxing record of 14–0, (7 KOs). His break-out performances as a kickboxer came while representing the New Jersey Tigers in the World Combat League in the 2007–08 season. On May 3, 2008, he defeated K-1 veteran Pat Barry at the WCL Eastern & Western Conference Finals at the Freeman Arena in San Antonio, Texas, the biggest feat of his career at that point.

Following the WCL's demise, Miller went on to rack up a 19–0 (8 KOs) record as a professional kickboxer on New York's heavyweight Muay Thai scene while also turning professional as a boxer.

His exploits won him admirers, and in 2012, after he knocked out Radu Spinghel in New York City, he was recruited by K-1, historically the world's premier kickboxing organization.

In his promotional debut, he went up against mixed martial arts knockout artist Jack May at the K-1 World Grand Prix 2012 in Los Angeles on September 8, 2012, with a place at the 2012 K-1 World Grand Prix at stake. Miller was able to knock May out with an uppercut in the first round to advance to the K-1 World Grand Prix 2012 in Tokyo final 16 on October 14, 2012, where he was drawn against Arnold Oborotov. Although Oborotov caused some problems with his low kicks, Miller was able to dominate with his superior boxing ability. He cruised to a unanimous decision win after sending the Lithuanian to the canvas in round one.

At the K-1 World Grand Prix FINAL in Zagreb on March 15, 2013, in Zagreb, Croatia, he battled Mirko Cro Cop in the quarter-finals. The panel of judges all scored the bout for Cro Cop by unanimous decision, handing Miller his first professional loss and sending him out of the tournament.

He signed with SUPERKOMBAT in August 2013. Replacing Sergei Kharitonov who withdrew from the fight due to a finger injury, Miller rematched Mirko Cro Cop at Glory 17: Los Angeles in Inglewood, California, on June 21, 2014. He lost by unanimous decision. Miller had a professional kickboxing record of 22–2, (10 KOs).

=== Doping suspension ===
In 2014, Miller was suspended for nine months by the California State Athletic Commission (CSAC) after methylhexaneamine was found in a urine sample he gave for Glory 17: Los Angeles.

=== Highlights ===
- Defeated Jack May - KO (1) - K-1 World Grand Prix 2012 in Los Angeles
- Defeated Arnold Oborotov - UD-3 - K-1 World Grand Prix 2012 in Tokyo final 16 - First Round

== Professional boxing record ==
31 fights	28 wins	1 loss
By knockout	22	1
By decision	6	0
Draws	2	

No.	Result	Record	Opponent	Type	Round, time	Date	Location	Notes
31	Win	28–1–2	Lenier Peró	UD	12	Apr 25, 2026	Fontainebleau Las Vegas, Winchester, Nevada, U.S.	
30	Win	27–1–2	Kingsley Ibeh	SD	10	Jan 31, 2026	Madison Square Garden, New York City, New York, U.S.	
29	Draw	26–1–2	Andy Ruiz Jr.	MD	12	Aug 3, 2024	BMO Stadium, Los Angeles, California, U.S.	
28	Loss	26–1–1	Daniel Dubois	TKO	10 (10), 2:52	Dec 23, 2023	Kingdom Arena, Riyadh, Saudi Arabia	
27	Win	26–0–1	Lucas Browne	TKO	6 (10), 2:33	Mar 18, 2023	Agenda Arena, Dubai, U.A.E.	
26	Win	25–0–1	Derek Cardenas	TKO	4 (10), 1:43	Jul 23, 2022	Embassy Suites Nashville SE, Murfreesboro, U.S.	
25	Win	24–0–1	Ariel Esteban Bracamonte	UD	10	Jun 23, 2022	Casino Buenos Aires, Buenos Aires, Argentina	
24	Win	23–0–1	Bogdan Dinu	KO	4 (12), 2:45	Nov 17, 2018	Kansas Star Arena, Mulvane, Kansas, U.S.	Won vacant WBA-NABA interim heavyweight title
23	Win	22–0–1	Tomasz Adamek	KO	2 (12), 0:51	Oct 6, 2018	Wintrust Arena, Chicago, Illinois, U.S.	
22	Win	21–0–1	Johann Duhaupas	UD	12	Apr 28, 2018	Barclays Center, New York City, New York, U.S.	
21	Win	20–0–1	Mariusz Wach	TKO	9 (12), 1:02	Nov 11, 2017	Nassau Coliseum, Uniondale, New York, U.S.	
20	Win	19–0–1	Gerald Washington	RTD	8 (10), 3:00	Jul 29, 2017	Barclays Center, New York City, New York, U.S.	
19	Win	18–0–1	Fred Kassi	RTD	3 (10), 3:00	Aug 19, 2016	Rhinos Stadium, Rochester, New York, U.S.	Retained WBO-NABO heavyweight title
18	Win	17–0–1	Nick Guivas	TKO	2 (10), 1:26	May 27, 2016	Seneca Niagara Resort Casino, Niagara Falls, New York, U.S.	Won vacant WBO-NABO heavyweight title
17	Win	16–0–1	Donovan Dennis	TKO	7 (10), 2:31	Jan 22, 2016	Grand Casino, Tucson, Arizona, U.S.	Won vacant WBA-NABA interim heavyweight title
16	Win	15–0–1	Akhror Muralimov	TKO	3 (8), 1:03	Oct 23, 2015	Celebrity Theatre, Phoenix, Arizona, U.S.	
15	Win	14–0–1	Excell Holmes	TKO	1 (6), 2:44	Jun 26, 2015	Seneca Niagara Casino & Hotel, Niagara Falls, New York, U.S.	
14	Win	13–0–1	Damon McCreary	TKO	2 (8), 1:08	Jun 4, 2015	Paramount Theatre, New York City, New York, U.S.	
13	Win	12–0–1	Raymond Ochieng	TKO	1 (6), 1:40	Apr 17, 2015	Grand Casino, Hinckley, Minnesota, U.S.	
12	Win	11–0–1	Aaron Kinch	UD	6	Jan 9, 2015	Chumash Casino, Santa Ynez, California, U.S.	
11	Win	10–0–1	Rodricka Ray	UD	6	Nov 13, 2014	The Space at Westbury, New York City, New York, U.S.	
10	Win	9–0–1	Joshua Harris	TKO	2 (6), 1:53	May 15, 2014	Millennium Theater, New York City, New York, U.S.	
9	Win	8–0–1	Jon Hill	TKO	3 (6), 2:38	Jan 31, 2014	Harrah's Philadelphia, Chester, Pennsylvania, U.S.	
8	Win	7–0–1	Sylvester Barron	TKO	2 (6), 2:20	Dec 18, 2013	Webster Hall, New York City, New York, U.S.	
7	Win	6–0–1	Willie Chisolm	TKO	2 (6), 0:52	Nov 7, 2013	Martin's Valley Mansion, Cockeysville, Maryland, U.S.	
6	Win	5–0–1	Tobias Rice	RTD	2 (4), 3:00	Sep 25, 2013	Five Starr Banquet, New York City, New York, U.S.	
5	Draw	4–0–1	Joey Dawejko	PTS	4	Jan 19, 2013	Mohegan Sun Casino, Uncasville, Connecticut, U.S.	
4	Win	4–0	Tyrone Gibson	TKO	2 (4), 1:25	Dec 19, 2012	Roseland Ballroom, New York City, New York, U.S.	
3	Win	3–0	Donnie Crawford	TKO	1 (4), 2:38	Apr 21, 2012	Cordon Bleu, New York City, New York, U.S.	
2	Win	2–0	Isaac Villanueva	TKO	3 (4), 1:53	May 19, 2011	Roseland Ballroom, New York City, New York, U.S.	
1	Win	1–0	Darius Whitson	TKO	1 (4), 3:00	Jul 18, 2009	Plattduetsche Park Restaurant, New York City, New York, U.S.	

== Exhibition boxing record ==
1 fight	0 wins	0 losses
By knockout	0	0
Non-scored	1	

No.	Result	Record	Opponent	Type	Round, time	Date	Location	Notes
1	—N/a	0–0 (1)	Antonio Zepeda	—N/a	4	Jun 11, 2023	FLA Live Arena, Sunrise, Florida, U.S.	Non-scored bout

== Kickboxing record (incomplete) ==
Kickboxing & Muay Thai record
22 Wins (10 KOs), 2 Losses
Date	Result	Opponent	Event	Location	Method	Round	Time
2014-06-21	Loss	(Croatia) Mirko Cro Cop	Glory 17: Los Angeles	The Forum, Inglewood, California, USA	Decision (unanimous)	3	3:00
2013-03-15	Loss	(Croatia) Mirko Cro Cop	K-1 World Grand Prix FINAL in Zagreb, Quarter Finals	Arena Zagreb, Zagreb, Croatia	Decision (unanimous)	3	3:00
2012-10-14	Win	(Lithuania) Arnold Oborotov	K-1 World Grand Prix 2012 in Tokyo final 16	Ryogoku International Stadium, Tokyo, Japan	Decision (unanimous)	3	3:00
2012-09-08	Win	(United States) Jack May	K-1 World Grand Prix 2012 in Los Angeles	Memorial Coliseum, Los Angeles, California, USA	KO (uppercut)	1 (3)	2:42
2011-09-16	Win	(United States) Radu Spinghel	Friday Night Fights Muay Thai	Broad Street Ballroom, New York City, New York, USA	TKO (cut)	1 (5)	2:09
2008-05-03	Win	(United States) Pat Barry	WCL Eastern & Western Conference Finals	Freeman Coliseum, San Antonio, Texas, USA	Decision (unanimous)	1	3:00
Legend: Win Loss Draw/No contest Notes

Sporting positions
Regional boxing titles
Vacant Title last held by Antonio Tarver	WBA–NABA heavyweight champion Interim title January 22, 2016 - February 1, 2016; Promoted	Vacant Title next held by Himself
Vacant Title last held by Shannon Briggs	WBA–NABA heavyweight champion February 1, 2016 - February, 2017; Vacated	Vacant Title next held by BJ Flores
Vacant Title last held by Charles Martin	WBO–NABO heavyweight champion May 27, 2016 – December, 2017; Stripped	Vacant Title next held by Jean-Pierre Augustin
Vacant Title last held by Himself	WBA–NABA heavyweight champion Interim title November 17, 2018 - April, 2019; Stripped	Vacant
