= Andriy Rudenko =

Ukrainian boxer

Andriy Rudenko Андрій Руденко
Personal information
- Nationality: Ukrainian
- Born: Андрій Володимирович Руденко; Andriy Volodymyrovych Rudenko; 4 September 1983 (age 42) Dnipropetrovsk, Ukrainian SSR, Soviet Union
- Height: 1.84 m (6 ft 0.5 in)
- Weight: Heavyweight

Boxing career
- Reach: 186 cm (73 in)
- Stance: Orthodox

Boxing record
- Total fights: 45
- Wins: 37
- Win by KO: 22
- Losses: 7
- No contests: 1
Medal record
Men's amateur boxing
Representing Ukraine
World University Championships
| Bronze medal – third place | 2004 Antalya | Super heavyweight |

Andriy Volodymyrovych Rudenko (Ukrainian: Андрій Володимирович Руденко; born 4 September 1983) is a Ukrainian professional boxer. At regional level, he held the Ukrainian heavyweight title in 2020; and challenged once for the European heavyweight title in 2019.

== Professional career ==
Rudenko faced undefeated heavyweight Lucas Browne on 1 August 2014, losing by unanimous decision. The judges scored the fight 116–112, 115–113, and 117–112 all in favour of Browne.

Rudenko faced undefeated heavyweight Hughie Fury on 21 February 2015, losing by unanimous decision. The judges scored the fight 98–92, 98–91, and 97–92 all in favour of Fury.

Rudenko faced former heavyweight champion Alexander Povetkin on 1 July 2017, losing by unanimous decision. Soon after the fight began, Rudenko had problems. The fight almost came to an end in the first round after Povetkin accidentally hit Rudenko in the back of his neck with an overhand punch in the middle of a clinch. Rudenko spent five minutes complaining that he had injured his neck while Povetkin waited patiently in the corner to resume, but fans in attendance began to whistle in displeasure at Rudenko, whom they saw as feigning injury. The ringside doctor determined that Rudenko had a spasm and that Rudenko wanted to pull out of the fight. However, the referee eventually persuaded Rudenko to continue. During the interval between rounds eight and nine, Rudenko again wanted to stop the fight, but his corner firmly insisted on continuing. The judges scored the fight 120–109, 120–108, and 120–108 all in favour of Povetkin.

Rudenko faced undefeated heavyweight Agit Kabayel on 2 March 2019, for the European title, losing by unanimous decision. The judges scored the fight 117-110, 116-111, and 119–108 all in favour of Kabayel.

Rudenko faced undefeated heavyweight Zhilei Zhang on 30 November 2019, losing by unanimous decision. The judges scored the fight 99-91, 98-92, and 97–93 all in favour of Zhang.

Rudenko faced undefeated heavyweight Vladyslav Sirenko on 18 December 2021, losing by technical knockout in the sixth round.

Rudenko faced undefeated heavyweight Jared Anderson on 26 August 2023, losing by technical knockout in the fifth round.

== Professional boxing record ==
| 45 fights | 37 wins | 7 losses |
|---|---|---|
| By knockout | 22 | 2 |
| By decision | 15 | 5 |
| No contests | 1 | |

| No. | Result | Record | Opponent | Type | Round, time | Date | Location | Notes |
|---|---|---|---|---|---|---|---|---|
| 45 | Win | 37–7 (1) | Oleksiy Timchenko | UD | 8 | 17 May 2025 | Cosmo Multimall, Kyiv, Ukraine | |
| 44 | Win | 36–7 (1) | Semen Pakhomov | KO | 1 (6), 2:35 | 28 Oct 2023 | Lviv, Ukraine | |
| 43 | Loss | 35–7 (1) | Jared Anderson | TKO | 5 (10), 1:40 | 26 Aug 2023 | Hard Rock Hotel & Casino, Tulsa, Oklahoma, US | For WBC–USNBC and WBO International heavyweight titles |
| 42 | Win | 35–6 (1) | Bojan Cestic | TKO | 2 (6), 1:46 | 28 Jan 2023 | Sportovni Hala Kladno, Kladno, Czech Republic | |
| 41 | Loss | 34–6 (1) | Vladyslav Sirenko | TKO | 6 (10) | 18 Dec 2021 | Terminal Ice Palace, Brovary, Ukraine | For WBC Asian, and vacant WBO Asia heavyweight titles |
| 40 | Win | 34–5 (1) | Andrea Pesce | UD | 8 | 30 Jul 2021 | Malevich Night Club, Lviv, Ukraine | |
| 39 | Win | 33–5 (1) | Kostiantyn Dovbyshchenko | UD | 10 | 20 Sep 2020 | Bartolomeo Best River Resort, Dnipro, Ukraine | Won vacant Ukrainian heavyweight title |
| 38 | Loss | 32–5 (1) | Zhilei Zhang | UD | 10 | 30 Nov 2019 | Casino de Monte Carlo, Monte Carlo, Monaco | For WBO Oriental heavyweight title |
| 37 | Loss | 32–4 (1) | Agit Kabayel | UD | 12 | 2 Mar 2019 | Maritim Hotel, Magdeburg, Germany | For European heavyweight title |
| 36 | Win | 32–3 (1) | Jone Volau | TKO | 3 (8), 2:09 | 22 Dec 2018 | Ice Palace Terminal, Brovary, Ukraine | |
| 35 | Loss | 31–3 (1) | Alexander Povetkin | UD | 12 | 1 Jul 2017 | Luzhniki Palace of Sports, Moscow, Russia | For vacant WBA Continental and WBO International heavyweight titles |
| 34 | Win | 31–2 (1) | Jason Bergman | UD | 10 | 24 Dec 2016 | Olympic Yard, Kyiv, Ukraine | Retained WBC International Silver heavyweight title |
| 33 | Win | 30–2 (1) | Tornike Puritchamiashvili | UD | 8 | 6 Nov 2016 | Parkovy Convention Center, Kyiv, Ukraine | |
| 32 | Win | 29–2 (1) | Marcelo Nascimento | KO | 3 (10), 2:50 | 24 Jul 2016 | National University Odesa Law Academy, Odesa, Ukraine | Won inaugural Ukraine International heavyweight title |
| 31 | Win | 28–2 (1) | Mike Mollo | TD | 7 (12) | 6 May 2016 | Ministerium, Odesa, Ukraine | Won vacant WBC International Silver heavyweight title; Unanimous TD: Mollo cut from accidental head clash |
| 30 | Win | 27–2 (1) | Konstantin Airich | TKO | 5 (10), 2:54 | 31 Oct 2015 | Circus, Kryvyi Rih, Ukraine | |
| 29 | Win | 26–2 (1) | Vaclav Pejsar | UD | 8 | 31 Jul 2015 | Imperia Sports Complex, Pidhirtsi, Ukraine | |
| 28 | Win | 25–2 (1) | Shalva Jomardashvili | KO | 7 (8) | 20 Jun 2015 | National Olympic Centre, Kyiv, Ukraine | |
| 27 | Loss | 24–2 (1) | Hughie Fury | UD | 10 | 21 Feb 2015 | Salle des Etoiles, Monte Carlo, Monaco | |
| 26 | Loss | 24–1 (1) | Lucas Browne | UD | 12 | 1 Aug 2014 | Civic Hall, Wolverhampton, England | For WBC Eurasia Pacific, and vacant WBA Inter-Continental heavyweight titles |
| 25 | Win | 24–0 (1) | Adnan Buharalija | TKO | 1 (8) | 16 Mar 2013 | Palace of Sports, Kyiv, Ukraine | |
| 24 | Win | 23–0 (1) | Istvan Ruzsinszky | TKO | 8 (8), 0:38 | 15 Dec 2012 | Budivelnyk, Cherkasy, Ukraine | |
| 23 | Win | 22–0 (1) | Serhiy Babych | TKO | 1 (8) | 21 Jul 2012 | Sports Palace, Odesa, Ukraine | |
| 22 | Win | 21–0 (1) | Paata Berikashvili | TKO | 4 (6) | 12 May 2012 | Ice Palace Terminal, Brovary, Ukraine | |
| 21 | Win | 20–0 (1) | Isroiljon Kurbanov | UD | 8 | 4 Dec 2010 | Ice Palace Terminal, Brovary, Ukraine | |
| 20 | Win | 19–0 (1) | Jason Barnett | KO | 2 (8), 1:16 | 4 Sep 2010 | Meteor Palace of Sports, Dnipro, Ukraine | |
| 19 | Win | 18–0 (1) | Raymond Ochieng | KO | 3 (8), 2:58 | 26 Jun 2010 | Sports Palace, Odesa, Ukraine | |
| 18 | Win | 17–0 (1) | Daniil Peretyatko | TKO | 4 (8), 1:58 | 24 Apr 2010 | Palace of Sports, Kyiv, Ukraine | |
| 17 | Win | 16–0 (1) | Avaz Rustamov | TKO | 3 (8), 2:54 | 19 Dec 2009 | Sport Palace Yunost, Zaporizhia, Ukraine | |
| 16 | Win | 15–0 (1) | Talgat Dosanov | TKO | 8 (8), 2:34 | 17 Sep 2009 | Meteor Palace of Sport, Dnipro, Ukraine | |
| 15 | Win | 14–0 (1) | Edgars Kalnars | TKO | 1 (8) | 27 Jun 2009 | Sportpalace, Lviv, Ukraine | |
| 14 | Win | 13–0 (1) | Yurii Horbenko | TKO | 2 (8), 2:58 | 22 Apr 2009 | Sports Palace Lokomotyv, Kharkiv, Ukraine | |
| 13 | Win | 12–0 (1) | Mykhailo Rutskiy | TKO | 1 (6) | 26 Feb 2009 | Palace of Sports, Kyiv, Ukraine | |
| 12 | NC | 11–0 (1) | Vladimir Chanturia | NC | 3 (8) | 27 Sep 2008 | Palace of Sports, Kyiv, Ukraine | |
| 11 | Win | 11–0 | Yavor Marinchev | UD | 8 | 14 Jun 2008 | Palace of Sports, Kyiv, Ukraine | |
| 10 | Win | 10–0 | Grigol Abuladze | KO | 1 (6) | 24 Apr 2008 | Circus, Lviv, Ukraine | |
| 9 | Win | 9–0 | David Gegeshidze | UD | 6 | 23 Mar 2008 | Meteor Palace of Sports, Dnipro, Ukraine | |
| 8 | Win | 8–0 | Vyacheslav Shcherbakov | TKO | 3 (4) | 2 Feb 2008 | Borschagovka Gym, Kyiv, Ukraine | |
| 7 | Win | 7–0 | Paata Berikashvili | UD | 6 | 12 Dec 2007 | Circus, Lviv, Ukraine | |
| 6 | Win | 6–0 | Aliaksandr Stsiapanau | TKO | 4 (4), 1:58 | 17 Nov 2007 | SC Voskhod, Kyiv, Ukraine | |
| 5 | Win | 5–0 | Zurab Noniashvili | UD | 4 | 13 Sep 2007 | Palace of Sports, Kyiv, Ukraine | |
| 4 | Win | 4–0 | Andrey Kindrich | UD | 6 | 26 Jun 2007 | Night Club Milenium, Lviv, Ukraine | |
| 3 | Win | 3–0 | Aleh Dubiaha | UD | 4 | 26 Feb 2007 | Sportpalace, Lviv, Ukraine | |
| 2 | Win | 2–0 | Mikhail Rak | TKO | 4 (4) | 20 Dec 2006 | Minsk, Belarus | |
| 1 | Win | 1–0 | Oleg Belikov | UD | 4 | 19 Oct 2006 | Circus, Lviv, Ukraine | |
