= Kingsley Ibeh =

Nigerian boxer (born 1993)

Personal information
- Nickname: The Black Lion
- Born: Kingsley C Ibeh; 13 November 1993 (age 32) Kaduna, Nigeria
- Height: 6 ft 4 in (193 cm)
- Weight: Heavyweight

Boxing career
- Reach: 80 in (203 cm)
- Stance: Southpaw

Boxing record
- Total fights: 21
- Wins: 17
- Win by KO: 15
- Losses: 3
- Draws: 1

Kingsley C Ibeh (born 13 November 1993) is a Nigerian professional boxer.

== Professional career ==
Ibeh faced undefeated Guido Vianello (7–0, 7 KOs) at the MGM Grand Conference Center in Las Vegas on 3 October 2020, fighting to a six-round draw.

Ibeh faced undefeated Jared Anderson (7–0, 7 KOs) at the MGM Grand Conference Center in Las Vegas on 13 February 2021, losing by knockout in the sixth round.

Ibeh faced former world title challenger Gerald Washington (21–6–1, 14 KOs) at the Gimnasio Nacional José Adolfo Pineda in San Salvador on 20 September 2025, winning by stoppage in the second round.

Ibeh faced Jarrell Miller (26–1–2, 22 KOs) on the undercard of Teofimo Lopez against Shakur Stevenson at the Madison Square Garden in New York City, on 31 January 2026, losing by split decision.

== Professional boxing record ==
| 21 fights | 17 wins | 3 losses |
|---|---|---|
| By knockout | 15 | 1 |
| By decision | 2 | 2 |
| Draws | 1 | |

| No. | Result | Record | Opponent | Type | Round, time | Date | Location | Notes |
|---|---|---|---|---|---|---|---|---|
| 21 | Win | 17–3–1 | Dante Stone | KO | 8 (10), 2:24 | 20 Jun 2026 | Celebrity Theater, Phoenix, Arizona, US | Retained WBC FECARBOX heavyweight title; Won vacant WBA Continental Americas and Arizona State heavyweight titles |
| 20 | Loss | 16–3–1 | Jarrell Miller | SD | 10 | 31 Jan 2026 | Madison Square Garden, New York City, New York, US | |
| 19 | Win | 16–2–1 | Gerald Washington | TKO | 3 (10), 0:26 | 20 Sep 2025 | Gimnasio Nacional José Adolfo Pineda, San Salvador, El Salvador | Won vacant WBC FECARBOX heavyweight title |
| 18 | Win | 15–2–1 | Scott Alexander | KO | 1 (10), 2:36 | 10 Jan 2025 | Emerald Queen Casino, Tacoma, Washington, US | Won vacant WBC Latino heavyweight title |
| 17 | Win | 14–2–1 | Jack May | KO | 1 (10), 0:50 | 19 Oct 2024 | Emerald Queen Casino, Tacoma, Washington, US | |
| 16 | Win | 13–2–1 | Juan Torres | TKO | 2 (8), 0:41 | 15 Jun 2024 | Emerald Queen Casino, Tacoma, Washington, US | |
| 15 | Win | 12–2–1 | Derek Saul Cardenas Perez | KO | 1 (6), 2:20 | 23 Mar 2024 | LumColor "Phoenix Center", Ontario, California, US | |
| 14 | Win | 11–2–1 | Jesus Alberto Martinez Torres | KO | 1 (8), 1:13 | 2 Dec 2023 | Janos, Chihuahua, Mexico | |
| 13 | Win | 10–2–1 | Terrell Jamal Woods | UD | 6 | 26 Aug 2023 | Mullett Arena, Tempe, Arizona, US | |
| 12 | Win | 9–2–1 | Ramon Olivas Echeverria | TKO | 1 (8), 2:38 | 10 Jun 2023 | Auditorio Municipal, Ascension, Chihuahua, Mexico | |
| 11 | Win | 8–2–1 | Daniel Cota | KO | 3 (10), 2:32 | 3 Sep 2022 | Chihuahua, Mexico | |
| 10 | Win | 7–2–1 | Jesus Alberto Martinez Torres | TKO | 3 (10), 0:57 | 5 Nov 2021 | Auditorio Municipal, Ascension, Chihuahua, Mexico | |
| 9 | Win | 6–2–1 | Diego Garcia Cardiel | KO | 2 (6), 2:49 | 27 Aug 2021 | Auditorio Municipal, Ascension, Chihuahua, Mexico | |
| 8 | Loss | 5–2–1 | Jared Anderson | KO | 6 (6), 2:19 | 13 Feb 2021 | MGM Grand Conference Center, Paradise, Nevada, US | |
| 7 | Draw | 5–1–1 | Guido Vianello | MD | 6 | 3 Oct 2020 | MGM Grand Conference Center, Paradise, Nevada, US | |
| 6 | Win | 5–1 | Patrick Mailata | MD | 6 | 2 Jul 2020 | MGM Grand Conference Center, Paradise, Nevada, US | |
| 5 | Win | 4–1 | Waldo Cortes Acosta | TKO | 4 (6), 1:41 | 5 Jun 2020 | MGM Grand Conference Center, Paradise, Nevada, US | |
| 4 | Win | 3–1 | Zeljko Stipetic | TKO | 1 (4), 2:46 | 21 Feb 2020 | Celebrity Theater, Phoenix, Arizona, US | |
| 3 | Win | 2–1 | Jose Galaviz | KO | 1 (4), 1:33 | 6 Dec 2019 | Legends Event Center, Phoenix, Arizona, US | |
| 2 | Loss | 1–1 | Waldo Cortes Acosta | SD | 4 | 12 Oct 2019 | Wild Horse Pass Hotel & Casino, Chandler, Arizona, US | |
| 1 | Win | 1–0 | Hector Nava Lopez | KO | 1 (4), 0:23 | 10 Aug 2019 | Gimnasio Municipal, Nuevo Casas Grandes, Chihuahua, Mexico | |

Sporting positions
Regional boxing titles
| Vacant Title last held by Edgar Ramirez | WBC Latino heavyweight champion 10 January 2025 – present | Incumbent |
| Vacant Title last held by Deontae Pettigrew | WBC FECARBOX heavyweight champion 20 September 2025 – present | Incumbent |
| Vacant Title last held by Deontae Pettigrew | WBA Continental Americas heavyweight champion 20 June 2026 – present | Incumbent |
| Vacant Title last held by Rico Brooks | Arizona State heavyweight champion 20 June 2026 – present | Incumbent |
