= Teofimo Lopez vs. Shakur Stevenson =

Boxing competition

Teófimo López vs. Shakur Stevenson
- Date: January 31, 2026
- Venue: Madison Square Garden, New York City, New York, U.S.
- Title(s) on the line: WBO & The Ring junior welterweight title

Tale of the tape
Boxer	Teofimo Lopez	Shakur Stevenson
Nickname	The Takeover	
Hometown	New York City, New York, U.S.	Newark, New Jersey, U.S.
Pre-fight record	22–1 (18 KOs)	24–0 (11 KOs)
Age	28 years, 5 months	28 years, 6 months
Height	5 ft 8 in (173 cm)	5 ft 8 in (173 cm)
Style	Orthodox	Southpaw
Recognition	The Ring and WBO junior welterweight champion 2-division world champion	WBC lightweight champion The Ring No. 7 ranked pound-for-pound fighter 3-division world champion

Result
- Stevenson wins via 12-round unanimous decision (119–109, 119–109, 119–109)

Teófimo López vs. Shakur Stevenson, billed as The Ring 6, was a Junior welterweight professional boxing match contested between The Ring and WBO junior welterweight champion Teofimo Lopez, and WBC lightweight champion Shakur Stevenson. The bout took place on January 31, 2026, at Madison Square Garden in New York City. Stevenson won by unanimous decision.

== Background ==
On December 1, 2025, It was officially announced Teofimo Lopez will defend his The Ring and WBO junior Welterweight Championship titles against WBC lightweight champion Shakur Stevenson. After Lopez lost his unified lightweight titles to George Kambosos Jr. in November 2021, he moved up to junior welterweight and won the WBO and The Ring titles in June 2023 with a unanimous decision victory over Josh Taylor. He made two title defenses in 2024 before defeating the previously unbeaten Arnold Barboza Jr. in New York City in May 2025.

Going into the bout, Stevenson was a three-division world champion, having previously held titles at featherweight and super featherweight before winning the WBC lightweight title in November 2023.

== The fight ==
Lopez struggled against Stevenson's boxing ability and jab, and Stevenson appeared dominant throughout the fight and bloodied Lopez, holding a 165 to 72 advantage in punches landed. The three official scorecards had Stevenson winning 119–109.

== Aftermath ==
In April 2026, Lopez discussed the fight and accused Stevenson of using tactics that were beyond standard exchanges, particularly at close range. He said Stevenson stood on his feet, used his elbows during clinches, and described these as part of a "dirty fight" strategy, which affected the flow of the fight. Lopez stated that these moments disrupted his rhythm and limited his offensive opportunities.

== Fight card ==
Bout:

Weight Class		vs.		Method	Round	Time	Notes
Junior Welterweight	Shakur Stevenson	def.	Teofimo Lopez (c)	UD	12	3:00	FOR WBO AND RING LIGHT WELTERWEIGHT TITLES
Super Lightweight	Keyshawn Davis	def.	Jamaine Ortiz	TKO	12/12	2:47
Featherweight	Bruce Carrington	def.	Carlos Castro	KO	9/12	1:29	FOR WBC FEATHERWEIGHT TITLE
Heavyweight	Jarrell Miller	def.	Kingsley Ibeh	SD	10	3:00
Middleweight	Austin Williams	def.	Wendy Toussiant	UD	10	3:00
Welterweight	Kevin Castillo	def.	Zayid Almaayouf	UD	8	3:00
