= PBC: The Next Round =

- Logo
- Genre: Professional boxing bouts
- Presented by: Fran Charles; Kevin Cunningham; Fred Hickman; Austin Trout; Deontay Wilder
- Country of origin: United States
- Original language: English

Production
- Camera setup: Multi-camera
- Running time: Various
- Production company: Bounce TV

Original release
- Network: Bounce TV
- Release: August 2, 2015 – August 18, 2018

PBC: The Next Round is the branding used for monthly Premier Boxing Champions cards broadcast on the Bounce TV digital multicast network.

== Coverage overview ==
On May 7, 2015, Bounce TV announced that they would be airing live boxing events from Premier Boxing Champions. Rather than having the broadcasters pay the promotion a rights fee, the telecasts are brokered by Al Haymon to the networks in exchange for a cut of advertising revenue. Bounce's first PBC card aired on August 2, 2015. The inaugural live telecast delivered 459,000 total viewers and averaged 333,000 households between 9:00 p.m.-12:15 a.m. It hit a peak audience of 667,000 total viewers and 444,000 households.

This wasn't the first time that Bounce carried boxing events. In 2012, Bounce carried World Boxing Association (WBA) Title matches and undercards.

=== Notable bouts ===
The inaugural card consisted of a four-man super welterweight tournament, John Jackson winning a 10-round unanimous decision over Dennis Laurente. The second tournament bout featured Jorge Cota defeating Yudel Johnson. In the main event, Juan Carlos Payano defeated Rau'shee Warren in a close, 12-round split decision to retain his Bantamweight Title.

On October 30, 2015 at The Venue at UCF in Orlando, Florida on Bounce TV, Gervonta Davis defeated former featherweight world titleholder Cristobal Cruz (40–18–4, 24 KOs) of Mexico.

Bounce's final PBC card was broadcast on August 3, 2018.

== Commentators ==
- Fran Charles (blow-by-blow)
- Kevin Cunningham (analysis)
- Fred Hickman (host)
- Austin Trout (analysis)
- Deontay Wilder (analysis)
