= Jerry Forrest =

American boxer (born 1988)

Personal information
- Nickname: Slugger
- Born: Jerry Gerard Forrest; April 8, 1988 (age 38) Lafayette, Louisiana, U.S.
- Height: 6 ft 1 in (185 cm)
- Weight: Heavyweight

Boxing career
- Reach: 78 in (198 cm)
- Stance: Southpaw

Boxing record
- Total fights: 38
- Wins: 30
- Win by KO: 22
- Losses: 6
- Draws: 2

Jerry Gerard Forrest (born April 8, 1988) is an American professional boxer.

== Amateur career ==
Forrest competed in the 2009 and 2010 Golden Gloves, losing on points in the preliminaries and quarterfinals.

== Professional career ==
Forrest faced undefeated Gerald Washington (8–0, 5 KOs) at the Fantasy Springs Resort Casino in Indio, California, on August 9, 2013, losing by knockout (KO) in the second round.

Forrest faced undefeated Michael Hunter (4–0, 3 KOs) at the StubHub Center in Carson, California, on June 21, 2014, losing an eight-round unanimous decision (UD).

Forrest faced undefeated Jermaine Franklin (18–0, 13 KOs) at the Emerald Queen Casino in Tacoma, Washington, on 12 July 2019, losing a controversial ten-round split decision (SD).

On June 16, 2020, it was announced that Forrest was scheduled to fight against Jarrell Miller (23–0–1, 20 KOs) on July 9, at the MGM Grand Conference Center in Paradise, Nevada. On June 27, it was reported that Miller had yet again failed a pre-fight drug test, returning positive results for the banned substance GW501516. Forrest still fought on the card and instead fought Carlos Takam in the main event, losing a ten-round unanimous decision.

Forrest faced Zhilei Zhang (22–0, 17 KOs) at the Hard Rock Stadium in Miami Gardens, Florida, on February 27, 2021, on the undercard of Canelo Álvarez's successful unified super middleweight title defence against Avni Yıldırım, fighting to a ten-round draw.

Forrest faced Hunter in a rematch at the Hammerstein Ballroom in New York City, New York, on December 2, 2021, fighting to a ten-round draw.

On April 4, 2022, it was announced that Forrest would fight Kubrat Pulev as a late replacement for Andrey Fedosov, who withdrew from the event. Pulev weighed 248.5 pounds and Forrest came in lighter at 233 pounds. Prior to the fight, there was a 90-minute delay backstage. Forrest's glove would not fit properly. The CSAC then requested him to remove his hand wraps, but this did not make a difference. After prolonged negotiation, Forrest was allowed to use Pulev's backup pair of Grant gloves, which were notably large. The delay caused frustration among fans in the arena, who began to boo both boxers as they made their ring entrances. Pulev defeated Forrest by unanimous decision after 10 rounds. The three judges scored the bout 98–92, 99–91, and 99–91 in favor of Pulev. Pulev landed 120 punches from 551 thrown (22%), while Forrest landed 98 from 494 (20%).

Forrest faced undefeated Jared Anderson (12–0, 12 KOs) at the Madison Square Garden in New York City, New York, on December 10, 2022, losing by technical knockout in the second round.

== Professional boxing record ==
38 fights	30 wins	6 losses
By knockout	22	2
By decision	7	4
By disqualification	1	0
Draws	2	

No.	Result	Record	Opponent	Type	Round, time	Date	Location	Notes
38	Win	30–6–2	Walter Burns	KO	1 (8), 2:21	Jan 9, 2026	Rivers Casino, Portsmouth, Virginia, U.S.	
37	Win	29–6–2	Junior Anthony Wright	KO	2 (10), 2:19	Jul 26, 2025	Main Street Station, Richmond, Virginia, U.S.	
36	Win	28–6–2	Earl Newman	UD	8	Oct 23, 2024	The Theater at Madison Square Garden, New York City, New York, U.S.	
35	Win	27–6–2	Robert Hall Jr.	UD	8	Sep 15, 2023	John Marshall Ballrooms, Richmond, Virginia, U.S.	
34	Loss	26–6–2	Jared Anderson	TKO	2 (10), 1:34	Dec 10, 2022	Madison Square Garden, New York City, New York, U.S.	For vacant WBO International heavyweight title
33	Loss	26–5–2	Kubrat Pulev	UD	10	May 14, 2022	Kia Forum, Inglewood, California, U.S.	
32	Draw	26–4–2	Michael Hunter	SD	10	Dec 2, 2021	Hammerstein Ballroom, New York City, New York, U.S.	
31	Draw	26–4–1	Zhilei Zhang	MD	10	Feb 27, 2021	Hard Rock Stadium, Miami Gardens, Florida, U.S.	
30	Loss	26–4	Carlos Takam	UD	10	Jul 9, 2020	MGM Grand Conference Center, Paradise, Nevada, U.S.	
29	Win	26–3	Martez Williamson	KO	2 (6), 0:07	Sep 14, 2019	Dulles Sportsplex, Sterling, Virginia, U.S.	
28	Loss	25–3	Jermaine Franklin	SD	10	Jul 12, 2019	Emerald Queen Casino, Tacoma, Washington, U.S.	
27	Win	25–2	Joshua Tufte	UD	8	Apr 13, 2013	Boonsboro Ruritan Club, Lynchburg, Virginia, U.S.	
26	Win	24–2	Grover Young	UD	8	Mar 8, 2019	Maryland Live Casino, Hanover, Maryland, U.S.	
25	Win	23–2	Jaudiel Zepeda	TKO	1 (6), 1:24	Feb 9, 2019	Masonic Temple, Norfolk, Virginia, U.S.	
24	Win	22–2	Lamont Capers	TKO	3 (8), 2:56	Jan 26, 2019	Waldorf Cultural Center, Waldorf, Maryland, U.S.	
23	Win	21–2	Edgar Perez	RTD	1 (6), 3:00	Dec 8, 2018	Masonic Temple, Norfolk, Virginia, U.S.	
22	Win	20–2	Miree Coleman	RTD	3 (10), 3:00	Aug 4, 2018	Dulles Sportsplex, Sterling, Virginia, U.S.	
21	Win	19–2	Miree Coleman	KO	2 (10), 2:57	Apr 14, 2018	Masonic Temple, Norfolk, Virginia, U.S.	Won vacant UBF All America heavyweight title
20	Win	18–2	Gregory Smith Jr.	TKO	1 (6), 2:56	Dec 9, 2017	Masonic Temple, Norfolk, Virginia, U.S.	
19	Win	17–2	Grover Young	DQ	1 (10)	Aug 12, 2017	Masonic Temple, Norfolk, Virginia, U.S.	Young disqualified after pushing and cursing at the referee
18	Win	16–2	Grover Young	UD	6	Jun 17, 2017	Du Burns Arena, Baltimore, Maryland, U.S.	
17	Win	15–2	Willis Lockett	TKO	2 (6), 2:53	May 13, 2017	Masonic Temple, Norfolk, Virginia, U.S.	
16	Win	14–2	Willis Lockett	UD	4	Aug 25, 2016	Costal Edge, Virginia Beach, Virginia, U.S.	
15	Win	13–2	Ariel Espinal	TKO	1 (6), 0:11	Jul 16, 2016	Masonic Temple, Norfolk, Virginia, U.S.	
14	Win	12–2	Daniel Shull	KO	2 (4), 0:40	Jun 11, 2016	ABC Sports Complex, Springfield, Virginia, U.S.	
13	Win	11–2	Richard Carmack	KO	2 (6), 1:02	Mar 20, 2016	Rahway Recreation Center, Rahway, New Jersey, U.S.	
12	Win	10–2	Marlon Hayes	KO	1 (4), 0:38	Nov 21, 2015	Masonic Temple, Norfolk, Virginia, U.S.	
11	Win	9–2	Carlos Black	KO	1 (4)	Sep 26, 2015	Masonic Temple, Norfolk, Virginia, U.S.	
10	Win	8–2	Riley Brooks	KO	2 (4), 2:51	Mar 28, 2015	ABC Sports Complex, Springfield, Virginia, U.S.	
9	Loss	7–2	Michael Hunter	UD	8	Jun 21, 2014	StubHub Center, Carson, California, U.S.	
8	Loss	7–1	Gerald Washington	KO	2 (8), 1:32	Aug 9, 2013	Fantasy Springs Resort Casino, Indio, California, U.S.	
7	Win	7–0	Darrick Allen	TKO	1 (4), 0:36	Jun 8, 2013	EchoStage Lounge, Washington, D.C., U.S.	
6	Win	6–0	Robert Dunton	TKO	2 (6), 0:43	Apr 20, 2013	Masonic Temple, Norfolk, Virginia, U.S.	
5	Win	5–0	Tracey Johnson	TKO	1 (6), 2:07	Feb 18, 2013	VA Live Sports Bar & Entertainment Center, Chesapeake, Virginia, U.S.	
4	Win	4–0	Dalton Dixon	TKO	2 (4)	Jan 27, 2013	Masonic Temple, Norfolk, Virginia, U.S.	
3	Win	3–0	Derek Walker	TKO	2 (4), 2:39	Dec 1, 2012	Masonic Temple, Norfolk, Virginia, U.S.	
2	Win	2–0	Brice Ritani Coe	UD	4	Nov 1, 2012	Washington Hilton & Towers, Washington, D.C., U.S.	
1	Win	1–0	Keon Graham	TKO	1 (4), 0:41	Aug 4, 2012	Renaissance Hotel, Washington, D.C., U.S.	

Sporting positions
Regional boxing titles
Vacant Title last held by Lyle McDowell	UBF All America heavyweight champion April 14, 2018 – June 2026; Vacated	Vacant Title next held by Malik Titus
