= Damian Knyba =

Polish boxer (born 1996)

Personal information
- Nickname: Polish Hussar
- Nationality: Polish
- Born: 25 January 1996 (age 30) Bydgoszcz, Poland
- Height: 6 ft 7 in (201 cm)
- Weight: Heavyweight

Boxing career
- Reach: 86 in (218 cm)
- Stance: Orthodox

Boxing record
- Total fights: 19
- Wins: 18
- Win by KO: 11
- Losses: 1

Damian Knyba (born 25 January 1996) is a Polish professional boxer. He challenged once for World Boxing Council (WBC) interim heavyweight title in January 2026. He holds a notable win over former unified heavyweight world champion Andy Ruiz.

== Amateur career ==
Knyba had an amateur record of 23 wins and 7 losses. He won the Polish Youth Championship in 2019 and the Polish Senior Championship in 2020.

== Professional career ==
Knyba made his professional boxing debut on 26 June 2021 in Człopa where he stopped Petr Frohlich in the second round. On 10 December 2022, Knyba fought Puerto Rican boxer Emilio Salas at Madison Square Garden on the undercard of Teofimo Lopez vs. Sandor Martin, winning by technical knockout in the second round.

Knyba signed a long-term promotional contract with Top Rank in January 2023.

=== Knyba vs. Kabayel ===
On 4 November 2025, it was announced that Knyba would take on Agit Kabayel (26–0, 19 KOs) for his WBC interim heavyweight title on 10 January 2026 in Oberhausen, Germany. Knyba suffered his first defeat by a controversial third-round TKO. The first round was very successful for Knyba, who scored several hard shots to Kabayel's face, opening a cut over the right eye. However, Kabayel retook control in the second round, upping the pace and landing his own power shots in return. By the third round, Knyba was still trying to match Kabayel's pace but continued to receive more and more punishment, eventually suffering several clean shots that prompted the referee to intervene. However, many observers, including Knyba, considered the stoppage premature, as Knyba was still fighting back and attempting to defend. His entrance made headlines as he walked out dressed as a Polish hussar along with knights. He walked out to the Polish celebratory anthem, Rota, which is known to be an anti-German song written in protest of the German Empire's forced policies of Germanization of Poles in the earlier 20th century. Whilst walking out, Polish fans in attendance sang along.

=== Knyba vs. Ruiz Jr. ===
On 4 September 2026, Knyba fought former unified heavyweight champion Andy Ruiz Jr. (35–2–1, 22 KOs) at the Prudential Center in Newark, New Jersey. Knyba dominated the fight, relying on his jab and keeping the distance, and scored a knockdown in the seventh round. He won the fight by unanimous decision, with the judges' scorecards reading 117–110 and 114–113 (x2).

== Professional boxing record ==
19 fights	18 wins	1 loss
By knockout	11	1
By decision	7	0

No.	Result	Record	Opponent	Type	Round, time	Date	Location	Notes
19	Win	18–1	Andy Ruiz Jr.	UD	12	4 Sep 2026	Prudential Center, Newark, New Jersey, U.S.	
18	Loss	17–1	Agit Kabayel	TKO	3 (12), 2:36	10 Jan 2026	Rudolf Weber-Arena, Oberhausen, Germany	For WBC interim heavyweight title
17	Win	17–0	Joey Dawejko	TKO	7 (8), 2:25	18 Oct 2025	Barclays Center, New York City, New York, U.S.	
16	Win	16–0	Marcin Siwy	RTD	8 (10). 3:00	21 Jun 2025	Prudential Center, Newark, New Jersey, U.S.	
15	Win	15–0	Andrzej Wawrzyk	TKO	3 (10), 2:21	1 Feb 2025	Prudential Center, Newark, New Jersey, U.S.	
14	Win	14–0	Richard Lartey	KO	3 (8), 2:10	2 Nov 2024	Turning Stone Resort Casino, Verona, New York, U.S.	
13	Win	13–0	Michael Polite Coffee	UD	8	9 Dec 2023	Charles F. Dodge City Center, Pembroke Pines, Florida, U.S.	
12	Win	12–0	Helaman Olguin	UD	8	10 Jun 2023	Madison Square Garden Theater, New York City, New York	
11	Win	11–0	Curtis Harper	TKO	8 (8), 2:38	8 Apr 2023	Prudential Center, Newark, New Jersey. U.S.	
10	Win	10–0	Emilio Salas	TKO	2 (6), 1:50	10 Dec 2022	Madison Square Garden Theater, New York City, New York, U.S.	
9	Win	9–0	Kostiantyn Dovbyshchenko	UD	8	8 Oct 2022	Hala MOSiR ul. Klodnicka 85, Ruda Śląska, Poland	
8	Win	8–0	Santander Silgado Gelez	TKO	1 (6), 2:49	13 Aug 2022	Ranson Civic Center, Ranson, West Virginia, U.S.	
7	Win	7–0	Terrell Jamal Woods	UD	6	21 May 2022	Amazura Concert Hall, Queens, New York, U.S.	
6	Win	6–0	Knife Didier	KO	1 (8), 2:16	4 Mar 2022	Hala widowiskowo-sportowa, Szczytno, Poland	
5	Win	5–0	Aazddin Aajour	KO	1 (6), 2:43	7 Jan 2022	Hala Sportowa, Zawonia, Poland	
4	Win	4–0	Yury Bykhautsou	UD	6	23 Oct 2021	Nosalowy Dwór, Zakopane, Poland	
3	Win	3–0	Giorgi Tamazashvili	KO	1 (4), 2:25	28 Aug 2021	Amfiteatr nad Jeziorem Czos, Mrągowo, Poland	
2	Win	2–0	Igor Pylypenko	UD	4	17 Jul 2021	Arena Suwałki, Suwałki, Poland	
1	Win	1–0	Petr Frohlich	TKO	2 (4), 2:33	26 Jun 2021	Gospoda, plac Zwyciestwa Wojska Polskiego 13, Człopa, Poland	
