= Frank Sánchez (boxer) =

Cuban boxer (born 1992)

Personal information
- Nickname: The Cuban Flash
- Born: Frank Sánchez Faure; 18 July 1992 (age 34) Guantanamo, Cuba
- Height: 6 ft 4 in (193 cm)
- Weight: Heavyweight

Boxing career
- Reach: 78 in (198 cm)

Boxing record
- Total fights: 28
- Wins: 26
- Win by KO: 19
- Losses: 1
- No contests: 1

Frank Sánchez Faure (born 18 July 1992) is a Cuban professional boxer. At regional level, he held the NABO heavyweight title from 2019 to 2024.

== Professional career ==
Sánchez made his professional debut on 22 September 2015, scoring a first-round technical knockout (TKO) victory against Justin Thornton at the Mel Ott Recreation Center in Gretna, Louisiana.

After winning his first six fights, all by stoppage, he faced Lamont Capers on 4 May 2018. Capers received a point deduction in the first round for excessive holding before the contest was halted in the second round after Capers was shoved through the ropes and out of the ring. With capers not able to continue, the bout was scored a no contest (NC).

Following six more wins, four by stoppage, Sánchez faced Victor Bisbal for the vacant WBO-NABO heavyweight title on 31 August 2019 at the Minneapolis Armory in Minneapolis, Minnesota. Sánchez defeated Bisbal via fourth-round corner retirement (RTD) after Bisbal's corner informed referee Celestino Ruiz that Bisbal was unwilling to continue before the start of the fifth round. After Efe Ajagba pulled out of a bout with Jack Mulowayi due to a back injury sustained during training, Sánchez was brought in as a late replacement. The bout took place on 26 October at the Santander Arena in Reading, Pennsylvania. Sánchez won a shutout unanimous decision (UD) to capture the vacant WBO-NABO title for a second time, with all three judges scoring the bout 100–90. His next fight came against Joey Dawejko for the vacant WBC Continental Americas heavyweight title on 7 March 2020 at the Barclays Center in New York City. Sánchez captured his second professional title via UD over ten rounds, with two judges scoring the bout 100–90 and the third scoring it 98–92.

Following his win against Dawejko, Sánchez recorded back-to-back knockout wins against Brian Howard and Julian Fernandez, before facing Nagy Aguilera on the undercard of Canelo Álvarez vs. Billy Joe Saunders on 8 May 2021. Sánchez won the bout by unanimous technical decision after six rounds, after Aguilera told officials that he was not able to continue after an unintentional foul.

Sánchez faced undefeated Efe Ajagba on 9 October 2021 on the undercard of Tyson Fury vs. Deontay Wilder III. Sánchez knocked down Ajagba en route to a unanimous decision victory, with scores of 98–91, 98–91 and 97–92.

Sánchez was expected to face Carlos Negrón on 1 January 2022, on the undercard of the Luis Ortiz and Charles Martin heavyweight bout. It was announced on 28 December 2021 that Negrón had withdrawn from the bout due to a positive COVID-19 test, and would be replaced by Christian Hammer. Sánchez won the fight by unanimous decision. He was awarded every single round of the fight, and scored a debatable knockdown in the tenth round.

On 23 December 2023 in Riyadh, Saudi Arabia, Sanchez defeated Junior Fa via seventh-round TKO.

Sánchez lost his WBC Continental Americas and NABO titles to Agit Kabayel in Riyadh, Saudi Arabia, on 18 May 2024, suffering a seventh round stoppage defeat.

He fought Richard Torrez at the Pyramids of Giza in Egypt on 23 May 2026, knocking his opponent out 55 seconds into the second round.

== Professional boxing record ==
28 fights	26 wins	1 loss
By knockout	19	1
By decision	7	0
No contests	1	

No.	Result	Record	Opponent	Type	Round, time	Date	Location	Notes
28	Win	26–1 (1)	Richard Torrez	KO	2 (12), 0:55	23 May 2026	Pyramids of Giza, Giza, Egypt	
27	Win	25–1 (1)	Ramon Olivas Echeverria	TKO	3 (6)	22 Feb 2025	Auditorio Municipal, Tijuana, Mexico	
26	Loss	24–1 (1)	Agit Kabayel	KO	7 (12), 2:33	18 May 2024	Kingdom Arena, Riyadh, Saudi Arabia	Lost WBC Continental Americas and WBO-NABO heavyweight titles
25	Win	24–0 (1)	Junior Fa	TKO	7 (12), 2:42	23 Dec 2023	Kingdom Arena, Riyadh, Saudi Arabia	Retained WBC Continental Americas and WBO-NABO heavyweight titles
24	Win	23–0 (1)	Scott Alexander	RTD	4 (10), 3:00	30 Sep 2023	T-Mobile Arena, Las Vegas, U.S.	Retained WBC Continental Americas heavyweight title
23	Win	22–0 (1)	Daniel Martz	KO	1 (10), 1:41	8 Apr 2023	Dignity Health Sports Park, Carson, California, U.S.	
22	Win	21–0 (1)	Carlos Negrón	TKO	9 (10), 1:36	15 Oct 2022	Barclays Center, Brooklyn, New York, U.S.	Retained WBC Continental Americas and WBO-NABO heavyweight titles
21	Win	20–0 (1)	Christian Hammer	UD	10	1 Jan 2022	Seminole Hard Rock Hotel & Casino, Hollywood, Florida, U.S.	
20	Win	19–0 (1)	Efe Ajagba	UD	10	9 Oct 2021	T-Mobile Arena, Paradise, Nevada, U.S.	Retained WBC Continental Americas and WBO-NABO heavyweight titles
19	Win	18–0 (1)	Nagy Aguilera	TD	6 (10), 1:42	8 May 2021	AT&T Stadium, Arlington, Texas, U.S.	Retained WBC Continental Americas heavyweight title Unanimous TD: Aguilera unable to continue after an unintentional foul
18	Win	17–0 (1)	Julian Fernandez	KO	7 (10), 1:35	19 Dec 2020	Alamodome, San Antonio, Texas, U.S.	
17	Win	16–0 (1)	Brian Howard	KO	4 (10), 2:07	7 Nov 2020	Microsoft Theater, Los Angeles, California, U.S.	Retained WBO-NABO heavyweight title
16	Win	15–0 (1)	Joey Dawejko	UD	10	7 Mar 2020	Barclays Center, New York City, New York, U.S.	Won vacant WBC Continental Americas heavyweight title Retained WBO-NABO heavyweight title
15	Win	14–0 (1)	Jack Mulowayi	UD	10	26 Oct 2019	Santander Arena, Reading, Pennsylvania, U.S.	Retained WBO-NABO heavyweight title
14	Win	13–0 (1)	Victor Bisbal	RTD	4 (10), 3:00	31 Aug 2019	Minneapolis Armory, Minneapolis, Minnesota, U.S.	Won vacant WBO-NABO heavyweight title
13	Win	12–0 (1)	Jason Bergman	TKO	2 (6), 1:20	13 Jul 2019	Minneapolis Armory, Minneapolis, Minnesota, U.S.	
12	Win	11–0 (1)	Willie Jake Jr.	KO	2 (8), 2:59	11 Jan 2019	StageWorks, Shreveport, Louisiana, U.S.	
11	Win	10–0 (1)	Carlos Reyes	KO	1 (8), 1:11	30 Nov 2018	Complex Arena, Salt Lake City, Utah, U.S.	
10	Win	9–0 (1)	Garrett Wilson	UD	6	20 Oct 2018	CFE Arena, Orlando, Florida, U.S.	
9	Win	8–0 (1)	Francois Russell	TKO	2 (6), 1:42	30 Jun 2018	Celebrity Theater, Phoenix, Arizona, U.S.	
8	Win	7–0 (1)	Miguel Cubos	UD	6	1 Jun 2018	Complex Arena, Salt Lake City, Utah, U.S.	
7	NC	6–0 (1)	Lamont Capers	NC	2 (6), 0:16	4 May 2018	Reno-Sparks Convention Center, Reno, Nevada, U.S.	Fight stopped after Capers was pushed out of the ring and left unable to continue
6	Win	6–0	Brad Austin	TKO	1 (6), 1:51	26 Apr 2018	Durham Armory, Durham, North Carolina, U.S.	
5	Win	5–0	Eric Salazar	TKO	1 (6), 1:12	23 Mar 2018	Complex Arena, Salt Lake City, Utah, U.S.	
4	Win	4–0	Brian Green	KO	2 (6), 0:45	3 Mar 2018	Jackson County Expo, Central Point, Oregon, U.S.	
3	Win	3–0	Juan Reyna	TKO	1 (4), 2:04	23 Feb 2018	Derby Park Expo, Louisville, Kentucky, U.S.	
2	Win	2–0	Manuel Eastman	TKO	2 (6), 2:31	27 Jan 2018	Buffalo Thunder Casino, Pojoaque, New Mexico, U.S.	
1	Win	1–0	Justin Thornton	TKO	1 (6), 1:32	22 Sep 2017	Mel Ott Recreation Center, Reading, Pennsylvania, U.S.	
