= David Rodriguez (boxer) =

American boxer

David "Nino" Rodriguez
Personal information
- Nickname: Nino
- Born: David Rodriguez; September 18, 1977 (age 49) El Paso, Texas U.S.
- Height: 6 ft 5 in (1.96 m)
- Weight: Heavyweight

Boxing career
- Reach: 79 in (200.7 cm)
- Stance: Orthodox

Boxing record
- Total fights: 39
- Wins: 37
- Win by KO: 35
- Losses: 2
- Draws: 0

David "Nino" Rodriguez (born September 18, 1977) is an American heavyweight boxer. He was formerly ranked number 10 in the world by the WBC and number 12 by the WBA.

== Boxing career ==
Rodriguez had a previous unblemished record of 36–0, with 34 by knockout. His first round knockout ratio surpassed every heavyweight in history to date. During training for the first of his 2011 fights, Rodriguez survived a brutal knife attack, the result of which was a near-death experience and a facial scar that extends from his ear to his chin. Shortly thereafter, he also suffered an injury to his knee, sidetracking what was intended to be a career-defining year. Before both of these injuries many boxing critics, experts and aficionados believed David Nino Rodriguez would undoubtedly become the first Mexican Heavyweight Champion of the World. He was even listed on the top 25 best new prospects of the ESPN pound for pound list.

His career eventually ended with a 37–2 record. David Rodriguez held the Texas Heavyweight title, New Mexico Heavyweight title, NABU Heavyweight title, NABA Heavyweight title as well as two of the WBC belts.One being the highly prestigious WBC Heavyweight Championship of Mexico. After 16 months of retirement, Nino finally returned November 21, 2015, with a 42-second 1st round win KO over Miguel Domingues of Brazil (having a record of 23–4, with 21 knockouts).

== Post-boxing career ==
Rodriguez has not since stepped back into the ring due to chronic back issues. Rodriguez is now seen occasionally on national television commentating Championship boxing. He is also an anti-bullying key note speaker and best-selling author of the book When the Lights Go Out. David has a subscription website, ninoscorner.tv, where he discusses current events, as well as his life history, both in and out of the ring. He uses humor and PG-13 language to inform and entertain his audiences. As of December 2025, his YouTube channel has 510,000 subscribers, and reaches upwards of 50 million a month with all platforms combined. Rodriguez is the founder and CEO of Ninoscorner.tv which is now a well established media company. David Nino Rodrigues had the rare ability to transition from professional sports to owning his own media company.

== Personal life ==
As far as his personal life, he tends to keep that private. He has several pets, including a cat Stryker and a tortoise named Millie. He is close to his parents in El Paso and to his family. He is also a practicing Christian; he attributes the turnaround of his alcoholism to his Christian faith.

Rodriguez is a committed Donald Trump supporter, and has stated as recently as 2026 that Trump is secretly conducting a decade-long quest to "take down the global cabal."

In 2024, Rodriguez made public accusations that singer Taylor Swift and Kansas City Chiefs Tight End Travis Kelce "will both go down as traitors." He further claimed that they had both "sold out America and humanity for fame and service to self."

== Professional boxing record ==
37 Wins (35 knockouts), 2 Loss, 0 Draws
Result	Record	Opponent	Type	Round	Date	Location	Notes
Win	37–2	(Brazil) Gilberto Matheus Domingos	TKO	1 (6)	21/11/2015	Complex Arena, Salt Lake City, United States	
Loss	36–2	(Kenya) Raymond Ochieng	TKO	1 (4)	18/07/2014	Southwest University Event Center, El Paso, Texas, United States	
Loss	36–1	(United States) Darnell Wilson	KO	6 (6)	14/12/2013	Resorts International, Atlantic City, New Jersey, United States	
Win	36–0	(United States) Byron Polley	TKO	2 (10)	03/12/2011	Pan American Center, Las Cruces, New Mexico, United States	Won vacant NABU heavyweight title.
Win	35–0	(Jamaica) Owen Beck	KO	3 (10)	24/05/2011	Don Haskins Convention Center, El Paso, Texas, United States	Won vacant WBC FECOMBOX heavyweight title.
Win	34–0	(United States) Matt Hicks	TKO	2 (8)	11/02/2011	Don Haskins Convention Center, El Paso, Texas, United States	Hicks down once in round 1.
Win	33–0	(United States) Daniel Bispo	TKO	2 (10)	27/03/2010	Arena Monterrey, Monterrey, Nuevo León, Mexico	Bispo was knocked down in 1st round.
Win	32–0	(United States) Robert Davis	TKO	3 (10)	12/09/2009	Arena Monterrey, Monterrey, Nuevo León, Mexico	
Win	31–0	(Argentina) Manuel Pucheta	TKO	7 (12)	14/03/2009	Auditorio Centenario, Torreon, Coahuila, Mexico	Won vacant NABA heavyweight title.
Win	30–0	(United States) Marvin Ray Jones	TKO	1 (6)	22/11/2008	Plaza de Toros, Monterrey, Nuevo León, Mexico	
Win	29–0	(United States) Andy Sample	TKO	1 (6)	27/09/2008	Arena Mexico, Mexico City, Distrito Federal, Mexico	Body shot.
Win	28–0	(United States) Josh Gutcher	KO	1 (8)	08/03/2008	Plaza de Toros, Cancun, Quintana Roo, Mexico	
Win	27–0	(United States) Marcus McGee	UD	8	21/12/2007	Dickerson's Event Center, Las Cruces, New Mexico, United States	Scores were 77-75, 77-75 and 79-73.
Win	26–0	(United States) Rick Dyer	TKO	2 (10)	30/06/2007	Don Haskins Convention Center, El Paso, Texas, United States	
Win	25–0	(United States) Marcus Rhode	TKO	3 (6)	19/05/2007	Gypsy, Fayetteville, Arkansas, United States	
Win	24–0	(United States) Stacy Goodson	TKO	1 (10)	24/03/2007	Oaks, Fort Smith, Arkansas, United States	Goodson down 3 times.
Win	23–0	(United States) John Turlington	TKO	2 (6)	17/08/2006	Crowne Plaza Hotel, Houston, Texas, United States	
Win	22–0	(United States) Dan Whetzel	TKO	1 (10)	15/07/2006	Fifth Third Ballpark, Comstock Park, Michigan, United States	
Win	21–0	(United States) Jeff Pegues	KO	1 (4)	27/05/2006	Ramada Inn, Topeka, Kansas, United States	
Win	20–0	(United States) Brandon Quigley	KO	1 (4)	10/12/2005	Legion Hall, Blairstown, Iowa, United States	
Win	19–0	(United States) John Turlington	UD	4	09/04/2005	Don Haskins Convention Center, El Paso, Texas, United States	Scores were 40-36, 40-36 and 39-37.
Win	18–0	(United States) Bryan Robinson	TKO	1 (6)	16/03/2005	Waterloo, Iowa, United States	
Win	17–0	(United States) Travis Fulton	TKO	1 (8)	22/10/2004	County Coliseum, El Paso, Texas, United States	
Win	16–0	(United States) Cruz Quintana	TKO	1 (4)	09/07/2004	Don Haskins Convention Center, El Paso, Texas, United States	
Win	15–0	(United States) Jeff Lally	TKO	1 (?)	17/04/2004	Pan American Center, Las Cruces, New Mexico, United States	Won vacant USA New Mexico State heavyweight title. Lally down 3 times.
Win	14–0	(United States) Jason Curry	KO	1 (8)	27/02/2004	Longshoremen's Hall, San Francisco, California, United States	
Win	13–0	(United States) Tommy Connelly	KO	1 (8)	07/11/2003	Don Haskins Convention Center, El Paso, Texas, United States	Won vacant USA Texas State heavyweight title.
Win	12–0	(United States) Gary Butler	TKO	1 (6)	09/08/2003	Rio Grande High School, Albuquerque, New Mexico, United States	
Win	11–0	(United States) Mike Parker	KO	1 (6)	21/06/2003	Nuevo Laredo, Tamaulipas, Mexico	
Win	10–0	(United States) Ricky Jefferson	KO	1 (8)	19/04/2003	Camel Rock Casino, Santa Fe, New Mexico, United States	
Win	9–0	(United States) Steve Shearburn	KO	1 (6)	13/02/2003	Don Haskins Convention Center, El Paso, Texas, United States	
Win	8–0	(United States) Rex Jackson	KO	1 (4)	20/09/2002	Cohen Stadium, El Paso, Texas, United States	
Win	7–0	(United States) Arthur Trass	TKO	1 (4)	10/05/2002	El Paso County Coliseum, El Paso, Texas, United States	
Win	6–0	(United States) Clinton Whitehead	KO	1 (4)	08/02/2002	Don Haskins Convention Center, El Paso, Texas, United States	
Win	5–0	(Mexico) Martin Lopez	TKO	3 (4)	10/06/2001	Far West Rodeo, El Paso, Texas, United States	
Win	4–0	(United States) Victor Bursey	KO	1 (4)	02/06/2001	Bricktown Hotel, Oklahoma City, Oklahoma, United States	
Win	3–0	(United States) Gerald Pond	TKO	1 (4)	15/05/1999	Equestrian Center, El Paso, Texas, United States	
Win	2–0	(United States) David Valenzuela	TKO	1 (4)	21/01/1999	Sheraton Hotel, Houston, Texas, United States	
Win	1–0	(United States) James Martin	KO	1 (4)	03/12/1998	Sheraton Hotel, Houston, Texas, United States	
