= Jared Anderson (boxer) =

American boxer (born 1999)

Personal information
- Nickname: The Real Big Baby
- Born: Jared Dovan Anderson; November 16, 1999 (age 26) Toledo, Ohio, U.S.
- Height: 6 ft 4 in (193 cm)
- Weight: Heavyweight

Boxing career
- Reach: 78 1/2 in (199 cm)
- Stance: Orthodox

Boxing record
- Total fights: 19
- Wins: 18
- Win by KO: 15
- Losses: 1
Medal record
Men's amateur boxing
Representing United States
U.S. National Championships
Gold medal – first place	2017 Salt Lake City	Heavyweight
Gold medal – first place	2018 Salt Lake City	Heavyweight

Jared Dovan Anderson (born November 16, 1999) is an American professional boxer. At regional level, he held the NABF heavyweight title in 2021. As an amateur, he won the 2017 and 2018 U.S. National Championships.

== Professional career ==
Anderson signed a multi-year promotional contract with Bob Arum's Top Rank on September 24, 2019, and made his professional debut a month later on October 26, scoring a first-round knockout (KO) victory over Daniel Infante at the Reno-Sparks Convention Center in Reno, Nevada.

Anderson faced Andrew Satterfield in his third professional fight, which he won by a first-round technical knockout. On June 9, 2020, Anderson beat Johnnie Langston by a third-round technical knockout. It was the first time that Anderson had fought past the first round. Anderson scored another first-round stoppage on July 16, 2020, when he beat Hector Perez. Anderson passed the first round for the second time in his career on September 5, 2020, against Rodney Hernandez, whom he beat by a fourth-round technical knockout. Anderson closed out 2020 with a first-round technical knockout of Luis Peña on October 31, 2020.

Anderson was scheduled to face Kingsley Ibeh on February 13, 2021, and won his first fight of 2021 by a sixth-round knockout. Anderson next faced Jeremiah Karpency on April 10, 2021, and once again won by a knockout, stopping Karpency early in the second round. Anderson improved to 10–0 when he beat the previously undefeated Vladimir Tereshkin (22–0–1) on October 9, 2021 on the undercard of Tyson Fury vs. Deontay Wilder III via second-round technical knockout. Anderson was scheduled to face Oleksandr Teslenko on December 11, 2021, on the undercard of the Vasiliy Lomachenko and Richard Commey lightweight bout. He won the bout via second-round technical knockout.

On April 13, 2024 in Corpus Christi, Texas, Anderson was scheduled to face Ryad Merhy. He won the fight by unanimous decision.

Anderson was scheduled to face Congolese boxer Martin Bakole at BMO Stadium in Los Angeles on August 3, 2024. Anderson lost the fight by TKO in the fifth round.

Anderson was scheduled to face Marios Kollias (12–3–1) at The Theater at Madison Square Garden in New York on February 14, 2025. Anderson won the fight by unanimous decision.

On March 26, 2026, Anderson signed a co-promotional deal with Frank Warren's Queensberry Promotions. Warren was pleased to add Anderson to his growing stable of heavyweights and confirmed his next fight would take place in the UK. Soon after, it was revealed his opponent would be British heavyweight Solomon Dacres (10–1, 3 KOs) in a 10-round bout, on the Fabio Wardley vs. Daniel Dubois undercard at the Co-op Live Arena in Manchester. On April 26, the fight was cancelled after Anderson tore his biceps.

== Professional boxing record ==
19 fights	18 wins	1 loss
By knockout	15	1
By decision	3	0

No.	Result	Record	Opponent	Type	Round, time	Date	Location	Notes
19	Win	18–1	Marios Kollias	UD	10	Feb 14, 2025	The Theater at Madison Square Garden, New York City, New York, U.S.	
18	Loss	17–1	Martin Bakole	KO	5 (10), 2:07	Aug 3, 2024	BMO Stadium, Los Angeles, California, U.S.	Lost WBO International heavyweight title; For vacant WBC-NABF heavyweight title
17	Win	17–0	Ryad Merhy	UD	10	Apr 13, 2024	American Bank Center, Corpus Christi, Texas, U.S.	Retained WBC–USNBC and WBO International heavyweight titles
16	Win	16–0	Andriy Rudenko	TKO	5 (10), 1:40	Aug 26, 2023	Hard Rock Hotel & Casino, Tulsa, Oklahoma, U.S.	Retained WBC–USNBC and WBO International heavyweight titles
15	Win	15–0	Charles Martin	UD	10	Jul 1, 2023	Huntington Center, Toledo, Ohio, U.S.	Retained WBC–USNBC and WBO International heavyweight titles
14	Win	14–0	George Arias	RTD	3 (10), 3:00	Apr 8, 2023	Prudential Center, Newark, New Jersey, U.S.	Retained WBO International heavyweight title; Won vacant WBC–USNBC heavyweight title
13	Win	13–0	Jerry Forrest	TKO	2 (10), 1:34	Dec 10, 2022	Madison Square Garden, New York City, New York, U.S.	Won vacant WBO International heavyweight title
12	Win	12–0	Miljan Rovcanin	KO	2 (8), 3:00	Aug 27, 2022	Hard Rock Hotel & Casino, Tulsa, Oklahoma, U.S.	
11	Win	11–0	Oleksandr Teslenko	TKO	2 (8), 1:33	Dec 11, 2021	Madison Square Garden, New York City, New York, U.S.	
10	Win	10–0	Vladimir Tereshkin	TKO	2 (8), 2:51	Oct 9, 2021	T-Mobile Arena, Paradise, Nevada, U.S.	Won vacant NABF Junior heavyweight title
9	Win	9–0	Jeremiah Karpency	KO	2 (8), 0:34	Apr 10, 2021	Osage Casino, Tulsa, Oklahoma, U.S.	
8	Win	8–0	Kingsley Ibeh	KO	6 (6), 2:19	Feb 13, 2021	MGM Grand Conference Center, Paradise, Nevada, U.S.	
7	Win	7–0	Luis Peña	TKO	1 (6), 2:46	Oct 31, 2020	MGM Grand Conference Center, Paradise, Nevada, U.S.	
6	Win	6–0	Rodney Hernandez	TKO	4 (6), 2:22	Sep 5, 2020	MGM Grand Conference Center, Paradise, Nevada, U.S.	
5	Win	5–0	Hector Perez	TKO	1 (4), 1:45	Jul 16, 2020	MGM Grand Conference Center, Paradise, Nevada, U.S.	
4	Win	4–0	Johnnie Langston	TKO	3 (6), 1:55	Jun 9, 2020	MGM Grand Conference Center, Paradise, Nevada, U.S.	
3	Win	3–0	Andrew Satterfield	TKO	1 (4), 2:30	Jan 18, 2020	Turning Stone Resort Casino, Verona, New York, U.S.	
2	Win	2–0	Stephen Kirnon	TKO	1 (4), 1:30	Nov 30, 2019	Cosmopolitan of Las Vegas, Paradise, Nevada, U.S.	
1	Win	1–0	Daniel Infante	KO	1 (4), 0:54	Oct 26, 2019	Reno-Sparks Convention Center, Reno, Nevada, U.S.	
