= Raymond Ochieng =

Kenyan boxer (born 1977)

Personal information
- Nickname: King Kong
- Nationality: Kenyan
- Born: 26 January 1977 (age 49) Nairobi, Kenya
- Height: 6 ft 3 1/2 in (192 cm)
- Weight: Heavyweight

Boxing career
- Reach: 81 in (206 cm)
- Stance: Orthodox

Boxing record
- Total fights: 54
- Wins: 26
- Win by KO: 21
- Losses: 25
- Draws: 3

Raymond Andrew Ochieng (born 26 January 1977) is a Kenyan professional boxer.

== Career ==
Ochieng compiled an amateur record of 169 wins with 11 losses in his career as an amateur. He turned professional on 12 December 2002, beating fellow débutante Luke Okeno by knockout in the second round.

Ochieng since then went 4–3 in his next seven with three of those losses coming to Mashaka Mululu, Krzysztof Włodarczyk and Samson Onyango. He fought Vladimir Lazebnik on 11 March 2006 but lost by technical knockout in the fifth round.

Ochieng then fought Konstantin Airich, losing in the second round by knockout on 21 September 2007 before taking on Timo Hoffmann on 10 October 2008, losing in the fourth round, again by knockout. Ochieng was knocked to the canvas once in the second round and twice in the fourth round before the referee stopped the fight.

Ochieng faced Andrzej Wawrzyk on 9 May 2009 and lost in the fifth round by technical knockout, in which Ochieng was down twice in the fourth round and once in the fifth round while having a point deducted before the referee stopped the fight. He then went on to beat James Omollo by technical knockout in the fourth round on 29 August 2009.

Ochieng called out Jarrell Miller following his win over David Rodriguez in 2014. Miller accepted and they faced off in April 2015. Miller won via first-round TKO.
