= Agit Kabayel =

German boxer (born 1992)

Personal information
- Born: 23 September 1992 (age 34) Leverkusen, North Rhine-Westphalia, Germany
- Height: 6 ft 3 in (191 cm)
- Weight: Heavyweight

Boxing career
- Reach: 80 in (203 cm)
- Stance: Orthodox

Boxing record
- Total fights: 27
- Wins: 27
- Win by KO: 19

Agit Kabayel (born 23 September 1992) is a German professional boxer. He has held the World Boxing Council (WBC) heavyweight title since June 2026. At regional level, he has held multiple heavyweight championships, including the European title twice between 2017 and 2024.

As of June 2026, Kabayel is ranked as the world's third-best active heavyweight by The Ring and BoxRec.

== Early life ==
Kabayel was born in Leverkusen, North Rhine-Westphalia, Germany to Kurdish parents originating from the village of Uson/Cennetpazarı in Pazarcık, Turkey, from an Alevi family. He grew up in the nearby city of Bochum in relatively poor financial conditions. Kabayel initially began an apprenticeship as a skilled worker in railway track construction after obtaining Mittlere Reife. Occasionally he worked as a bouncer, pursued a career in football and later also tried kickboxing before turning to his current discipline, boxing.

== Professional career ==
=== Early career ===
Kabayel compiled a perfect record of 15–0 before winning the vacant European heavyweight title with a unanimous decision victory against Herve Hubeaux on 24 February 2017 in Cologne, Germany.

==== Kabayel vs. Chisora ====
In his next fight, Kabayel defended his European title against former WBC world title challenger Derek Chisora at the Casino de Monte Carlo Salle Médecin in Monte Carlo, Monaco, on 4 November 2017. Chisora was ranked #8 by the WBC at the time. In a largely low-key affair, Kabayel outboxed his opponent to a majority decision victory. The judges' scorecards read 115–113, 115–114, 114–114 in Kabayel's favour, handing Chisora his eighth professional loss. Chisora started the fight slow, remaining patient. He became more active after round six but failed to bustle the attack on Kabayel, who moved well with his feet. Kabayel also used quick combinations and jabs to win many of the rounds.

On 2 March 2019, Kabayel beat Andriy Rudenko by unanimous decision in a 12 round contest, almost a year after his previous bout. Over the next four years, Kabayel fought at this rate, with his next four bouts occurring yearly between 2020 and 2023. He eventually vacated his European title on 3 September 2019, after signing up with Top Rank.

=== Rise up the ranks ===
On 18 July 2020, Kabayel beat Evgenios Lazaridis by unanimous decision in their ten-round contest to win the vacant WBA Continental heavyweight title. The scorecards read 98–92, 100–90, 99–91 in favour of Kabayel.

In November 2020, it was revealed that Kabayel was in talks to challenge the then-undefeated WBC and The Ring heavyweight champion Tyson Fury on 5 December 2020 at the Royal Albert Hall, London, and that he had been sent a contract by Fury's promoter Frank Warren. However, the fight was ultimately cancelled due to complications with Fury's contractual disputes with former WBC champion Deontay Wilder regarding a potential trilogy fight between them.

On 5 June 2021, Kabayel returned to the ring to face former world title challenger Kevin Johnson. He retained his WBA Continental title and undefeated record with a wide unanimous decision, with scores of 118–111, 118–111, and 119–110 in his favour. Kabayel next faced Pavel Sour on 14 May 2022. He won the fight by a first-round technical knockout. After almost a year of inactivity, Kabayel returned on March 3, 2023 against Agron Smakici, recovering from a second-round knockdown to stop Smakici in the third, recapturing the vacant European heavyweight title in the process.

==== Kabayel vs. Makhmudov ====
On 23 December 2023, Kabayel challenged undefeated prospect Arslanbek Makhmudov for his WBC-NABF and WBA Inter-Continental titles at the Day of Reckoning event in Riyadh, Saudi Arabia. This was also the first time he had fought twice in one year since 2017. Entering the bout as the underdog, Kabayel produced a surprise upset, defeating Makhmudov by TKO in the fourth round to take his titles. He outmanoeuvred his larger opponent throughout the first three rounds, countering him hard to the head, before increasing the pressure in the fourth and going down to the body; it was then that he dropped Makhmudov three times before the referee waved off the fight. With this win, Kabayel improved to 24–0 with 16 knockouts.

==== Kabayel vs. Sánchez ====
On 18 May 2024, Agit Kabayel challenged undefeated Cuban contender Frank Sánchez for the WBC Continental Americas and WBO-NABO heavyweight titles at the Ring of Fire event in Riyadh's Kingdom Arena. The bout served as a WBC eliminator, positioning the winner as a mandatory challenger for the WBC heavyweight world title. Entering as the underdog, Kabayel delivered a commanding performance, employing strategic body shots and combinations to dominate the fight. In the seventh round, he knocked Sánchez down twice, leading to a knockout victory and two further regional titles to Kabayel's name.

=== WBC interim heavyweight champion ===
==== Kabayel vs. Zhang ====
On 22 February 2025, Agit Kabayel faced the former WBO interim heavyweight champion Zhilei Zhang at The Last Crescendo event in the ANB Arena in Riyadh, Saudi Arabia, for the vacant WBC interim heavyweight title. Kabayel won by knockout in the sixth round, becoming the first person to stop the otherwise durable Zhang. After weathering Zhang's pressure in the first round, Kabayel maintained a relentless body attack over the remainder of the fight, gradually slowing Zhang down round by round; despite suffering a knockdown in the fifth, Kabayel recovered and continued to pressure Zhang to the body, who was ultimately counted out after a hard shot to the liver forced him to take a knee. This win improved Kabayel's record to 26–0 and earned him the interim title.

==== Kabayel vs. Knyba ====
On 4 November 2025, it was announced that Kabayel would defend his interim title against the undefeated Damian Knyba (17–0, 11 KOs) in Oberhausen, Germany, scheduled for 10 January 2026. Kabayel struggled in the first round against his 2.01m opponent, who used his significant height and reach advantage to land several hard shots to Kabayel's face, opening a cut over his right eye. Nevertheless, Kabayel retook control of the fight, negating Knyba's reach advantage with his own pressure and increasingly landing his own punches to the head. Kabayel ultimately won in the third round after the referee waved off the fight, though the stoppage was deemed premature by some, including Knyba, who appeared to still be fighting back and attempting to defend himself.

=== WBC heavyweight champion ===
Following his victory over Zhilei Zhang, Kabayel was positioned as the mandatory challenger for the undisputed champion Oleksandr Usyk. In June 2026, Usyk unexpectedly vacated all his titles (WBC, WBA, IBF), leading the WBC to officially elevate Kabayel from interim champion to the full WBC heavyweight champion. With this elevation, Kabayel became the first German world heavyweight champion since Max Schmeling in 1932, as well as the first champion of Kurdish descent in boxing history.

==== Kabayel vs. Hysa ====
In October 2026, Queensberry Promotions officially announced that Kabayel's first defense of the WBC title is scheduled against undefeated Albanian contender Nelson Hysa. The bout is scheduled for 28 November 2026, at the Merkur Spiel-Arena in Düsseldorf, Germany.

== Personal life ==
Kabayel currently still resides in Bochum and lives in a multifamily residential with his wife, daughter, parents and other family members. After his fight against Makhmudov he became a millionaire. One of his cousins is KC Rebell, a Kurdish-German rapper. Kabayel openly embraces his Kurdish origins while also acknowledging the role Germany played in his personal and professional development. Therefore, he sees himself as "Kurdish and [...] German." Besides enjoying broad support within the Kurdish community in Germany, he also has many fans in Kurdish regions abroad. In April 2025, he visited the Kurdistan Region of Iraq, where he met with Prime Minister Masrour Barzani. In an interview, he stated that during his visit he felt he was "celebrated there as a national hero, and that this was an honor." He is also a brand ambassador for Visit Kurdistan, promoting tourism in the Kurdistan Region. Kabayel is a supporter of the German national football team.

== Professional boxing record ==
27 fights	27 wins	0 losses
By knockout	19	0
By decision	8	0

No.	Result	Record	Opponent	Type	Round, time	Date	Location	Notes
27	Win	27–0	Damian Knyba	TKO	3 (12), 2:36	10 Jan 2026	Rudolf Weber-Arena, Oberhausen, Germany	Retained WBC interim heavyweight title
26	Win	26–0	Zhilei Zhang	KO	6 (12), 2:29	22 Feb 2025	ANB Arena, Riyadh, Saudi Arabia	Won vacant WBC interim heavyweight title
25	Win	25–0	Frank Sánchez	KO	7 (12), 2:29	18 May 2024	Kingdom Arena, Riyadh, Saudi Arabia	Won WBC Continental Americas and WBO-NABO heavyweight titles
24	Win	24–0	Arslanbek Makhmudov	TKO	4 (10), 2:03	23 Dec 2023	Kingdom Arena, Riyadh, Saudi Arabia	Won WBC-NABF and WBA Inter-Continental heavyweight titles
23	Win	23–0	Agron Smakici	TKO	3 (12), 2:37	4 Mar 2023	RuhrCongress, Bochum, Germany	Won vacant European heavyweight title
22	Win	22–0	Pavel Sour	TKO	1 (8), 1:50	14 May 2022	Seebühne, Magdeburg, Germany	
21	Win	21–0	Kevin Johnson	UD	12	5 Jun 2021	Seebühne, Magdeburg, Germany	Retained WBA Continental heavyweight title
20	Win	20–0	Evgenios Lazaridis	UD	10	18 Jul 2020	Seebühne, Magdeburg, Germany	Won vacant WBA Continental heavyweight title
19	Win	19–0	Andriy Rudenko	UD	12	2 Mar 2019	Maritim Hotel, Magdeburg, Germany	Retained European heavyweight title
18	Win	18–0	Miljan Rovcanin	TKO	3 (12), 2:25	21 Apr 2018	Estrel Berlin Convention Hall II, Berlin, Germany	Retained European heavyweight title
17	Win	17–0	Derek Chisora	MD	12	4 Nov 2017	Salle Gaston Médecin, Monte Carlo, Monaco	Retained European heavyweight title
16	Win	16–0	Herve Hubeaux	UD	12	24 Feb 2017	Maritim Hotel, Magdeburg, Germany	Won vacant European heavyweight title
15	Win	15–0	Christian Lewandowski	KO	7 (12), 0:20	4 Jun 2016	Seebühne, Magdeburg, Germany	Won vacant European Union heavyweight title
14	Win	14–0	Lawrence Tauasa	TKO	3 (8), 2:29	9 Jan 2016	Maritim proArte Hotel, Berlin, Germany	
13	Win	13–0	Shalva Jomardashvili	KO	1 (8), 1:27	5 Dec 2015	Saarlandhalle, Saarbrücken, Germany	
12	Win	12–0	Maksym Pedyura	TKO	2 (8)	17 Oct 2015	Dm-Arena, Karlsruhe, Germany	
11	Win	11–0	Artsiom Charniakevich	TKO	3 (10)	14 Dec 2014	Maritim Hotel Köln, Cologne, Germany	
10	Win	10–0	Gbenga Oloukun	SD	10	22 Mar 2014	Atatürk Spor Salonu, Tekirdağ, Turkey	Won vacant WBC Mediterranean heavyweight title
9	Win	9–0	Wladimir Letr	KO	1 (6), 0:12	1 Feb 2014	Hala Okrąglak, Opole, Poland	
8	Win	8–0	Pavel Siska	TKO	2 (8), 2:05	15 Dec 2013	Docks, Hamburg, Germany	
7	Win	7–0	Alexander Kahl	TKO	1 (6), 1:21	27 Sep 2013	Atatürk Spor Salonu, Tekirdağ, Turkey	
6	Win	6–0	Engin Solmaz	TKO	2 (6), 1:42	27 Jul 2013	Kugelbake-Halle, Cuxhaven, Germany	
5	Win	5–0	Ivan Ćirković	TKO	2 (6), 2:20	6 Apr 2013	SPC Vojvodina, Novi Sad, Serbia	
4	Win	4–0	Waldemar Pahl	PTS	4	2 Jun 2012	Kolpinghaus Beckum, Beckum, Germany	
3	Win	3–0	Waldemar Pahl	TKO	3 (4), 1:50	30 Mar 2012	Maritim Hotel Köln, Cologne, Germany	
2	Win	2–0	Selcuk Dinc	PTS	4	23 Jul 2011	Tai-Kien Gym, Aachen, Germany	
1	Win	1–0	Yeton Abdullah	TKO	4 (4)	23 Jun 2011	Butan Gym, Wuppertal, Germany	

== Titles in boxing ==
=== Major world titles ===
- WBC heavyweight champion (200+ lbs)

=== Interim titles ===
- WBC Interim heavyweight champion (200+ lbs)

=== Regional/International titles ===
- WBC Mediterranean heavyweight champion (200+ lbs)
- European Union heavyweight champion (200+ lbs)
- European heavyweight champion (200+ lbs) (x2)
- WBA Continental heavyweight champion (200+ lbs)
- WBC–NABF heavyweight champion (200+ lbs)
- WBA Intercontinental heavyweight champion (200+ lbs)
- WBC Continental Americas heavyweight champion (200+ lbs)
- WBO–NABO heavyweight champion (200+ lbs)

== See also ==
- List of male boxers
- List of world heavyweight boxing champions

Sporting positions
Regional boxing titles
Vacant Title last held by Manuel Charr	WBC Mediterranean heavyweight champion 22 March 2014 – February 2015; Vacated	Vacant Title next held by Mohamed Al-Zein
Vacant Title last held by Erkan Teper	European Union heavyweight champion 4 June 2016 – April 2018; Vacated	Vacant Title next held by Otto Wallin
Vacant Title last held by Kubrat Pulev	European heavyweight champion 4 February 2017 – 3 September 2019; Vacated	Vacant Title next held by Joe Joyce
Vacant Title last held by David Price	WBA Continental heavyweight champion 18 July 2020 – March 2022; Vacated	Vacant Title next held by Fabio Wardley
Vacant Title last held by Joe Joyce	European heavyweight champion 4 March 2023 – 4 January 2024; Vacated	Vacant Title next held by Oleksandr Zakhozhyi
Preceded by Arslanbek Makhmudov	NABF heavyweight champion 23 December 2023 – August 2024; Vacated	Vacant Title next held by Martin Bakole
Preceded by Arslanbek Makhmudov	WBA Inter-Continental heavyweight champion 23 December 2023 – April 2024; Vacated	Vacant Title next held by Johnny Fisher
Preceded by Frank Sánchez	WBC Continental Americas heavyweight champion 18 May 2024 – 22 February 2025; Won interim world title	Vacant Title next held by Guido Vianello
Preceded by Frank Sánchez	NABO heavyweight champion 18 May 2024 – 22 February 2025; Vacated	Vacant Title next held by Richard Torrez
World boxing titles
Vacant Title last held by Dillian Whyte	WBC heavyweight champion Interim title 22 February 2025 – 27 June 2026; Promoted	Vacant
Preceded by Oleksandr Usyk; Vacated	WBC heavyweight champion 27 June 2026 – present	Incumbent
