= Kevin Cunningham =

American boxing trainer

Kevin Cunningham is an American boxing trainer who started the police boxing program in 1991, originally a police officer.

He is credited for bringing up boxing world champions Cory Spinks, Devon Alexander, David Diaz, and amateur boxing champion Stephen Shaw

== Police career ==
Kevin Started his career in police in St. Louis Eighth District, ending his police career as narcotics detective.

== Boxing trainer ==
=== Cory Spinks ===
Kevin's run with Cory Spinks started in 1995, winning championships in two weight classes (Welterweight and Super Welterweight), including the Undisputed Welterweight title vs Ricardo Mayorga in December 2003.

=== David Diaz ===
Kevin trained David Diaz going into his win vs established world champion Erik Morales.

=== Devon Alexander ===
Kevin started training Devon Alexander as a child, winning boxing championships in two divisions.

=== Stephen Shaw ===
Kevin helped train Shaw to win his second amateur championship in 2013. and started with him as an undefeated Heavyweight prospect in 2013.
