= Heavyweight =

Weight class in combat sports

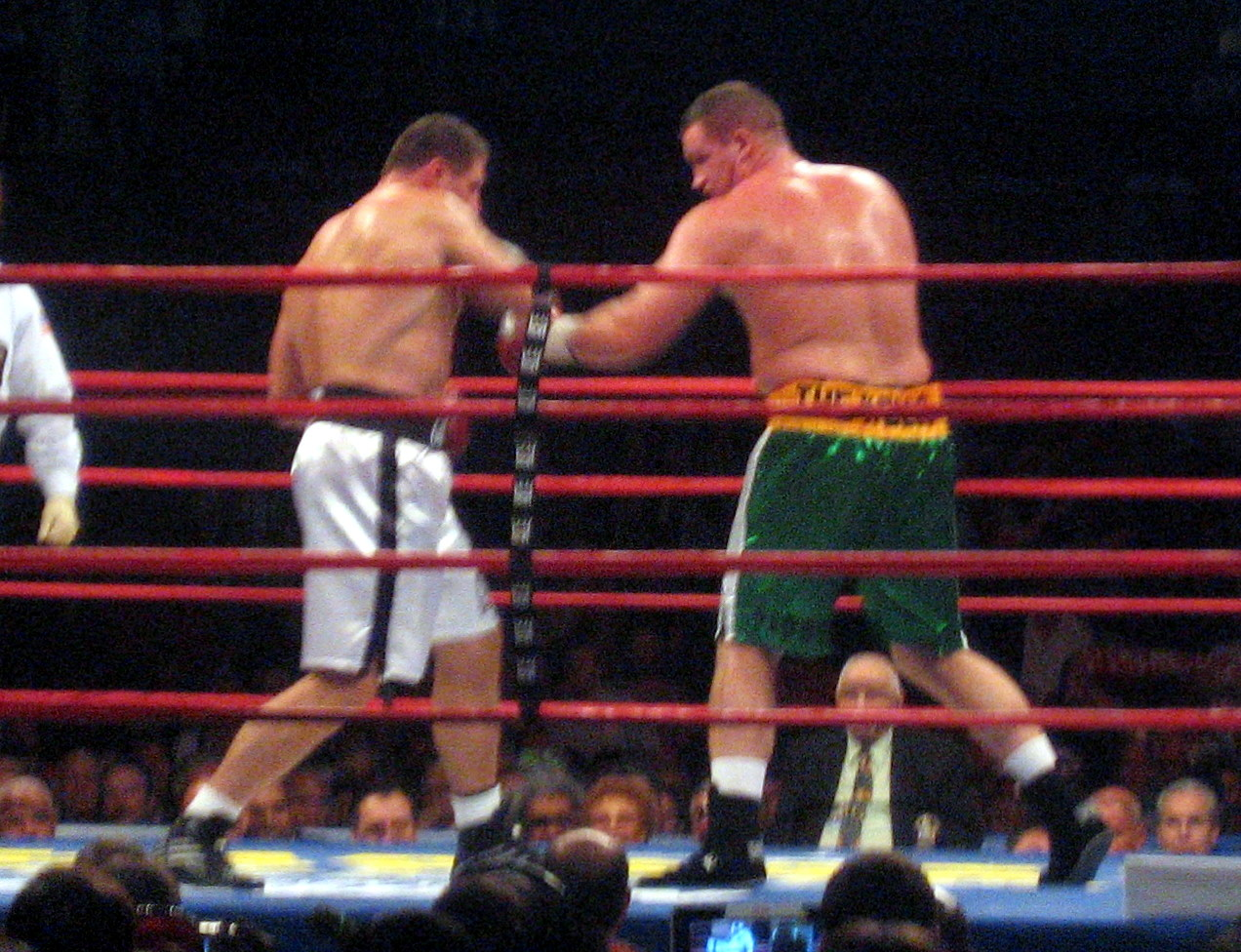
Heavyweight boxers Andrew Golota (on the left) vs. Kevin McBride at Madison Square Garden

Heavyweight is a weight class in combat sports and professional wrestling. In professional boxing, it is the maximum weight category, including all male boxers over 91 kg and female boxers over 81 kg.

== Boxing ==
=== Professional ===
Male boxers who weigh over 200 pounds (91 kg; 14 st 4 lb) are considered heavyweights by 2 of the 4 major professional boxing organizations: the International Boxing Federation and the World Boxing Organization. In 2020, the World Boxing Council increased their heavyweight classification to 224 pounds (102 kg; 16 st) to allow for their creation of the bridgerweight division. The World Boxing Association (WBA) did the same in 2023. Female boxers who weigh over 175 pounds (79 kg; 12 st 7 lb) are considered heavyweights by all four of the boxing federations.

==== Historical development ====
Because this division has no upper weight limit, it has historically been vaguely defined. In the 19th century, for example, many heavyweight champions weighed 170 pounds (77 kg; 12 st 2 lb) or less (although others weighed 200 pounds).

In 1920, the light heavyweight division was formed, with a maximum weight of 175 pounds (79 kg; 12 st 7 lb). Any fighter weighing more than 175 pounds was a heavyweight. The cruiserweight division (first for boxers in the 175–190 pound range) was established in 1979 and recognized by the various boxing organizations in the 1980s with a maximum weight of either 190 pounds (86 kg; 13 st 8 lb) or 195 pounds (88 kg; 13 st 13 lb). Later these organizations increased the cruiserweight limit to 200 pounds.

Since 1975, the Amateur Athletic Union of the United States and the Soviet Sports Committee established a new concept in international boxing, called "Heavy Duals," an all-heavyweight team contest between the United States and the Soviet Union.

As of 2025, Wladimir Klitschko holds records of beating the most boxers for the world heavyweight title, with 23, and the longest cumulative heavyweight title reign of all time, with 4,382 days as world heavyweight champion. (Note: Attributed to multiple sources:) Joe Louis has won the most world heavyweight title bouts, with 27, and had the most consecutive title defenses, with 26. (Note: According to BoxRec and IBHOF, Louis' fight against Johnny Davis in 1944, viewed by many as an exhibition fight, was for the NYSAC heavyweight title, which would lift Louis' title defenses to 26) This is also the record for most consecutive title defenses in boxing history.

Four boxers have regained the heavyweight title in an immediate rematch: Floyd Patterson in 1960, Muhammad Ali in 1978, Lennox Lewis in 2001, and Anthony Joshua in 2019. George Foreman holds the record for being the oldest heavyweight to ever achieve championship status, becoming champion at the age of 45, while Mike Tyson possesses the record for youngest heavyweight champion at 20. Tyson also became the first heavyweight to own all three major belts – WBA, WBC, and IBF as well as The Ring and lineal heavyweight titles at the same time.

==== Current world champions ====
Sanctioning Body	Reign Began	Champion	Record	Defenses
WBA	June 26, 2026	Murat Gassiev	34–2 (1) (27 KO)	1
WBC	June 27, 2026	Agit Kabayel	27–0 (19 KO)	0
IBF	Aug 29, 2026	Filip Hrgović	21–1 (16 KO)	0
WBO	May 9, 2026	Daniel Dubois	24–3 (23 KO)	1

==== Current world rankings ====
===== The Ring =====
As of September 4, 2026.

Keys:

C Current The Ring world champion

Rank	Name	Record (W–L–D)	Title(s)
c	Oleksandr Usyk	25–0 (16 KO)	
1	Daniel Dubois	23–3 (22 KO)	WBO
2	Agit Kabayel	27–0 (19 KO)	WBC
3	Tyson Fury	35–2–1 (24 KO)	
4	Filip Hrgović	21–1 (16 KO)	IBF
5	Fabio Wardley	20–1–1 (19 KO)	
6	Frank Sánchez	26–1 (19 KO)	
7	Efe Ajagba	21–1–1 (14 KO)	
8	Moses Itauma	14–1 (12 KO)	
9	Murat Gassiev	34–2 (1) (27 KO)	WBA
10	Justis Huni	13–1 (7 KO)	

===== BoxRec =====
As of 19 October 2026.

Rank	Name	Record (W–L–D)	Title(s)
1	Oleksandr Usyk	25–0 (16 KO)	The Ring
2	Daniel Dubois	24–3 (23 KO)	WBO
3	Agit Kabayel	27–0 (19 KO)	WBC
4	Murat Gassiev	34–2 (1) (27 KO)	WBA
5	Anthony Joshua	30–4 (27 KO)	
6	Tyson Fury	36–2–1 (25 KO)	
7	Filip Hrgović	21–1 (16 KO)	IBF
8	Lawrence Okolie	23–1 (17 KO)	
9	Fabio Wardley	20–2–1 (19 KO)	
10	Richard Riakporhe	20–1 (16 KO)	

==== Longest-reigning world heavyweight champions ====
Keys:

Active title reign
Reign has ended

Note 1: WBA (Regular) champions are not included
Note 2: WBO heavyweight title bouts before August 1997 are not included
Note 3: The names in italics are champions that did not win The Ring championship/lineal championship (August 29, 1885–July 2, 1921)/undisputed championship (July 2, 1921–present)

===== Combined reign =====
The list does not include The Ring and lineal championship fights after 1921.

As of 09 September 2025.

Pos.	Name	Combined reign	Days as champion	Number of reigns	Title recognition	Cumulative title wins	Opponents beaten
1.	Wladimir Klitschko	12 years, 0 months, 0 days	4 382	2	WBA, IBF, WBO	25	23
2.	Joe Louis	11 years, 8 months, 8 days	4 270	1	NYSAC, NBA	27	22
3.	Muhammad Ali	9 years, 5 months, 5 days	3 443	3	NYSAC, WBA, WBC	22	21
4.	Lennox Lewis	8 years, 5 months, 13 days	3 086	3	WBA, WBC, IBF	15	15
5.	Vitali Klitschko	7 years, 5 months, 28 days	2 735	3	WBC, WBO	15	15
6.	Larry Holmes	7 years, 3 months, 12 days	2 661	1	WBC, IBF	20	20
7.	Jack Dempsey	7 years, 2 months, 19 days	2 638	1	NYSAC, NBA	6	6
8.	John L. Sullivan	7 years, 0 months, 10 days	2 566	1	Universal	5	5
9.	Jack Johnson	6 years, 3 months, 11 days	2 292	1	Universal	6	6
10.	Evander Holyfield	6 years, 1 month, 1 day	2 223	4	WBA, WBC, IBF	11	10
11.	James J. Jeffries	5 years, 11 months, 4 days	2 156	1	Universal	8	6
12.	Tyson Fury	5 years, 1 month, 12 days	1 866	2	WBA, WBC, IBF, WBO	5	4
13.	Deontay Wilder	5 years, 1 month, 5 days	1 859	1	WBC	10	8
14.	Anthony Joshua	4 years, 11 months, 17 days	1 806	2	WBA, IBF, WBO	9	9
15.	Joe Frazier	4 years, 10 months, 18 days	1 785	1	NYSAC, WBA, WBC	10	10

===== Individual reign =====
Below is a list of longest reigning heavyweight champions in boxing measured by the individual's longest reign. The list includes both The Ring and lineal championships. Career total time as champion (for multiple time champions) does not apply.

As of 2 October 2025.

Pos.	Name	Title Reign	Title recognition
1.	Joe Louis	11 years, 8 months, 8 days	Lineal
2.	Wladimir Klitschko	9 years, 7 months and 6 days	IBF (+WBA, WBO, The Ring/Lineal)
3.	Larry Holmes	7 years, 3 months, 12 days	WBC-to-IBF (+The Ring/Lineal)
4.	Jack Dempsey	7 years, 2 months, 19 days	Lineal
5.	John L. Sullivan	7 years, 0 months, 9 days	Lineal
6.	Jack Johnson	6 years, 3 months, 10 days	Lineal
7.	Muhammad Ali	5 years, 11 months, 9 days	The Ring/Lineal, (+WBA, WBC stripped)
8.	James J. Jeffries	5 years, 11 months, 4 days	Lineal
9.	Vitali Klitschko	5 years, 2 months, 4 days	WBC
10.	Oleksandr Usyk	5 years, 1 month, 1 week and 2 days	WBO, IBF (+WBA, WBC, The Ring /Lineal)
11.	Deontay Wilder	5 years, 1 month 5 days	WBC
12.	Joe Frazier	4 years, 10 months, 18 days	NYSAC (+WBA, WBC)
13.	James J. Corbett	4 years, 6 months, 10 days	Lineal
14.	Jess Willard	4 years, 2 months, 29 days	Lineal
15.	Tyson Fury	4 years, 2 months, 26 days	WBC (+The Ring/Lineal)
16.	Lennox Lewis	4 years, 2 months, 15 days	WBC (+IBF, WBA stripped, The Ring/Lineal)

=== Amateur ===
The lower limit for heavyweight was established in 1948 at 81 kg (178.6 lb). A weight class named "super heavyweight" was established in 1984, and with it a maximum 91 kg (200.6 lb) for the heavyweight division.

== Kickboxing ==
- In kickboxing, a heavyweight fighter generally weighs between 88 and 100 kg (194 and 220 lb; 13 st 12 lb and 15 st 10 lb). The fighters over 100 kg (220 lb; 15 st 10 lb) are considered super heavyweights.
- International Kickboxing Federation (IKF) Heavyweight (Pro & Amateur) 215.1–235 lb or 97.6–106.6 kg.
- In Glory promotion, a heavyweight division is over 95 kg (209 lb) and no upper weight limit.
- In ONE Championship, the heavyweight division has an upper limit of 120.2 kg (265 lb).

== Mixed martial arts ==
The heavyweight division in MMA generally groups fighters between 206 and 265 lb (93 and 120 kg).

Heavyweight is also the title of a documentary film that documented the fight camp of Fabrício Werdum when he became the UFC Heavyweight Champion.

== Wrestling ==
The term "world heavyweight" in modern wrestling generally refers to a champion wrestler who is seen as a prominent competitor, rather than an adherent to a particular weight class. The World Heavyweight Championship in wrestling is usually considered the main title in a given promotion. Prior to the wrestling industry publicly acknowledging the predetermined nature of the sport, a Heavyweight title was generally competed for by larger wrestlers while smaller wrestlers competed as (among other names and classifications) "Junior Heavyweights", "Cruiserweights" and "Light-Heavyweights". The lucha libre promotion Consejo Mundial de Lucha Libre notably still has weight division for its champions. While most other promotions do not.

== Analogous uses ==
The word "heavyweight" is sometimes used in other fields (e.g. politics) to denote a person who is especially powerful or influential. Other boxing analogies include "punching above his [their] weight" to denote a person or entity (e.g. a country) whose influence is arguably greater than his/its basic attributes would suggest.
