= Michael Wallisch =

German boxer

Personal information
- Nationality: German
- Born: 1 November 1985 (age 41) Munich, West Germany
- Height: 1.97 m (6 ft 6 in)
- Weight: Heavyweight

Boxing career
- Stance: Orthodox

Boxing record
- Total fights: 30
- Wins: 24
- Win by KO: 17
- Losses: 6

Michael Wallisch (born 1 November 1985) is a German professional boxer. At regional level, he held the German heavyweight title from 2013 to 2014.

== Professional career ==
On 11 July 2015, Wallisch won the vacant WBO European Heavyweight Title with a knockout win over Italian Fabio Tuiach early in the 2nd round. He defended the title against Croatian Ivica Bacurin at the Maritim Hotel in Berlin, Germany, on 9 January 2016, winning the fight by unanimous decision after 12 rounds.

After three more wins (over Andre Bunga, Samir Barakovic, Bernard Adie) he faced Christian Hammer as undefeated, with a record of 19–0. By then Wallisch had been long considered a boxing prospect, though his career had been hindered by injuries and other troubles. It was his first chance against a valuable opponent, however, he was defeated by Hammer. In the fifth round, Hammer went out of a clinch and hit him with a right, and Wallisch, who seemed to "overplay the incident", sat down on the ropes, seemingly tired, as the referee counted him out.

Wallisch's loss to Hammer was followed by another defeat, this time at the hands of Efe Ajagba. After defeating Abdulnaser Delalic in Hamburg, he suffered his third loss, being defeated by Tony Yoka.

On 25 July 2020, Wallisch faced Joe Joyce at the BT Sport Studio in London, England. Wallisch put up a good fight in the first round, hitting Joyce with several solid punches. Joyce was in complete control in the second round, most notably causing Wallisch to drop to his knees after hitting him on his head. In the third round, Wallisch was forced again to touch the canvas with one knee, as he recovered after being hit by a left hook. He stood up once more and continued, but two power shots forced him to rest on one knee for a third time, and the referee was forced to stop the fight.

On 13 March 2021, he faced Didier "Knife" Kirola. Wallisch lost 18 kg before this fight. He dominated the fight from the first round and closed it by TKO in the 6th.

On 22 July 2021, Wallisch faced Murat Gassiev for the WBA Asia Heavyweight Title. Their fight was the main event of a multi-fight card, and took place at the Dynamo Volleyball Arena in Moscow, Russia. In the first round, which was dominated by Gassiev, there wasn't much action. Gassiev tracked Wallisch around the ring, and hit him with a powerful overhand right. Wallisch grew in the second round, in which he did better than Gassiev, though he wasn't able to hit him with anything significant. Gassiev didn't use his jab in the third round, stalking Wallisch with punches, but Wallisch managed to hit him with some shots. Gassiev, who is known for starting slow, hit Wallisch with power shots over head and body in the fourth round. Gassiev floored Wallisch two times in the fourth round, and then attacked him with a stream of punches, and the referee stopped the fight right before the bell.

== Professional boxing record ==
30 fights	24 wins	6 losses
By knockout	17	6
By decision	7	0

No.	Result	Record	Opponent	Type	Round, time	Date	Location	Notes
30	Win	24–6	Alen Lauriolle	KO	1 (6)	4 Jul 2026	Masters Gym, Krefeld, Germany	
29	Loss	23–6	Arslanbek Makhmudov	RTD	1 (10), 3:00	16 Dec 2022	Centre Gervais Auto, Shawinigan, Canada	For WBC-NABF and WBA-NABA heavyweight titles
28	Win	23–5	Toni Thes	TKO	2 (6)	28 May 2022	Die Bucht, Hamburg, Germany	
27	Loss	22–5	Murat Gassiev	TKO	4 (10), 3:00	22 Jul 2021	Dynamo Volleyball Arena, Moscow, Russia	For vacant WBA Asia heavyweight title
26	Win	22–4	Knife Didier	TKO	6 (6), 0:34	13 Mar 2021	ECB Boxgym, Hamburg, Germany	
25	Win	21–4	Kai Kurzawa	TKO	5 (8), 3:00	31 Oct 2020	ECB Boxgym, Hamburg, Germany	
24	Loss	20–4	Joe Joyce	TKO	3 (10), 0:57	25 Jul 2020	BT Sport Studio, London, England	
23	Loss	20–3	Tony Yoka	TKO	3 (10), 1:17	28 Sep 2019	Palais des Sports de Beaulieu, Nantes, France	
22	Win	20–2	Abdulnaser Delalic	TKO	2 (6), 2:33	6 Jul 2019	CU-Arena, Hamburg, Germany	
21	Loss	19–2	Efe Ajagba	TKO	2 (10), 1:40	27 Apr 2019	Cosmopolitan of Las Vegas, Paradise, Nevada, US	
20	Loss	19–1	Christian Hammer	KO	5 (12), 0:46	15 Dec 2018	Sporthalle, Hamburg, Germany	For vacant WBO European heavyweight title
19	Win	19–0	Bernard Adie	KO	1 (12), 0:35	16 Jun 2018	Wildparkstadion, Karlsruhe, Germany	Won vacant GBU heavyweight title
18	Win	18–0	Samir Barakovic	KO	4 (8), 1:10	3 Mar 2018	Ufgauhalle, Karlsruhe, Germany	
17	Win	17–0	Andre Bunga	UD	6	13 May 2017	Ufgauhalle, Karlsruhe, Germany	
16	Win	16–0	Ivica Bacurin	UD	12	9 Jan 2016	Maritim Hotel, Berlin, Germany	Retained WBO European heavyweight title
15	Win	15–0	Fabio Tuiach	TKO	2 (12), 0:31	11 Jul 2015	GETEC Arena, Magdeburg, Germany	Won vacant WBO European heavyweight title
14	Win	14–0	Ivica Perkovic	RTD	5 (8), 3:00	15 Nov 2014	O2 World, Hamburg, Germany	
13	Win	13–0	Edgars Kalnars	PTS	8	5 Sep 2014	SES-Gym, Magdeburg, Germany	
12	Win	12–0	Frank Schadwill	KO	2 (10), 2:11	1 Mar 2014	GETEC Arena, Magdeburg, Germany	Retained German heavyweight title
11	Win	11–0	Lars Buchholz	UD	10	6 Dec 2013	Brandenburg Halle, Frankfurt, Germany	Retained German heavyweight title
10	Win	10–0	Alexander Kahl	KO	1 (10), 0:47	13 Jul 2013	EnergieVerbund Arena, Dresden, Germany	Won vacant German heavyweight title
9	Win	9–0	Pavel Siska	KO	2 (6)	21 Dec 2012	Sluneta, Ústí nad Labem, Czech Republic	
8	Win	8–0	Dariusz Balla	KO	1 (6)	18 Nov 2011	Kugelbake Halle, Cuxhaven, Germany	
7	Win	7–0	Yakup Saglam	UD	10	1 Apr 2011	Digibet Pferdesportpark, Berlin, Germany	Won vacant German International heavyweight title
6	Win	6–0	Pavels Dolgovs	PTS	6	17 Dec 2010	Boxsporthalle Braamkamp, Hamburg, Germany	
5	Win	5–0	Serdar Uysal	TKO	2 (6)	23 Oct 2010	Ree Location, Hamburg, Germany	
4	Win	4–0	Ivan Bohdanov	TKO	4 (4)	20 Jun 2010	Sporthalle Steilshoop, Hamburg, Germany	
3	Win	3–0	Sebastian Tuchscherer	PTS	4	5 Jun 2010	Sportbox, Hamelin, Germany	
2	Win	2–0	Maik Kurzweil	KO	1 (4)	9 Apr 2010	Sport- und Kongresshalle, Schwerin, Germany	
1	Win	1–0	Taras Varava	TKO	3 (4), 2:11	27 Mar 2010	Alsterdorfer Sporthalle, Hamburg, Germany	

Sporting positions
Regional boxing titles
Vacant Title last held by Steffen Kretschmann	German International heavyweight champion 1 April 2011 – February 2012; Vacated	Vacant Title next held by Christian Hammer
Vacant Title last held by Andreas Sidon	German heavyweight champion 13 July 2013 – February 2018; Vacated	Vacant Title next held by Tom Schwarz
Vacant Title last held by Francesco Pianeta	WBO European heavyweight champion 11 July 2015 – October 2016; Vacated	Vacant Title next held by Christian Hammer
Minor world boxing titles
Vacant Title last held by Senad Gashi	GBU heavyweight champion 16 June 2018 – March 2022; Vacated	Vacant Title next held by Edi Delibaltaoglu
