= Christian Hammer =

Romanian-German professional boxer

Personal information
- Nickname: The Hammer
- Nationality: Romanian; German
- Born: Cristian Ciocan; 27 September 1987 (age 39) Pechea, Romania
- Height: 1.89 m (6 ft 2 1/2 in)
- Weight: Heavyweight

Boxing career
- Reach: 198 cm (78 in)
- Stance: Orthodox

Boxing record
- Total fights: 40
- Wins: 28
- Win by KO: 18
- Losses: 12
Medal record
Men's amateur boxing
Representing Romania
EU Championships
Bronze medal – third place	2007 Dublin	Heavyweight
Junior World Championships
Gold medal – first place	2006 Agadir	Heavyweight

Christian Hammer (born Cristian Ciocan) is a Romanian-German professional boxer.

== Professional career ==
Ciocan's first coach was Felix Păun.

=== Early career ===
He turned pro in Germany in 2008, but lost against Robert Gregorin his professional debut.

He won his next seven fights, but his winning streak was ended in 2010 after losing two fights in a row against Mariusz Wach and Taras Bidenko. Ciocan won the Won German International Heavyweight title in 2012 from Serdar Uysal, and vacant WBO EU Heavyweight title from Danny Williams.

=== Hammer vs. Tyson Fury ===
In 2015, he lost to British future world champion, Tyson Fury for the WBO International Heavyweight title.

=== Hammer vs. Teper ===
He held the WBO European Heavyweight title, which he won from Erkan Teper in 2016.

=== Hammer vs. Ortiz ===
On March 2, 2019, Hammer fought title contented Luis Ortiz. Ortiz was ranked #3 by the WBC and #8 by the IBF at heavyweight at the time. Ortiz won the fight convincingly, winning 100–90 and 99–91 twice on the scorecards.

=== Hammer vs. Yoka ===
On November 27, 2020, Hammer faced Tony Yoka. Yoka won the fight in convincing fashion, winning 100–89 across all three scorecards.

=== Hammer vs. Hughie Fury ===
On October 16, 2021, Hammer fought Hughie Fury. Fury was ranked #4 by the WBA and #14 by the IBF and heavyweight. Hammer was forced to retire in the fifth round due to injury.

== Professional boxing record ==
40 fights	28 wins	12 losses
By knockout	18	6
By decision	10	6

No.	Result	Record	Opponent	Type	Round, time	Date	Location	Notes
40	Win	28–12	Volodymyr Katsuk	KO	2 (8), 1:43	10 Oct 2025	Sala Sporturilor, Brașov, Romania	
39	Loss	27–12	Artem Suslenkov	UD	8	25 Oct 2024	Dynamo Sports Palace, Moscow, Russia	
38	Loss	27–11	Dillian Whyte	RTD	3 (10), 3:00	17 Mar 2024	TF Royal Theatre, Castlebar, Ireland	
37	Loss	27–10	Joe Joyce	TKO	4 (12), 1:20	2 Jul 2022	Wembley Arena, London, England	For WBC Silver and vacant WBO International heavyweight titles
36	Win	27–9	Drazen Zanjanin	TKO	1 (8), 2:58	28 May 2022	Die Bucht, Berlin, Germany	
35	Loss	26–9	Frank Sánchez	UD	10	1 Jan 2022	Seminole Hard Rock Hotel & Casino, Hollywood, Florida, US	
34	Loss	26–8	Hughie Fury	RTD	5 (10), 3:00	16 Oct 2021	Newcastle Arena, Newcastle, England	
33	Win	26–7	Patryk Kowoll	TKO	3 (8), 2:18	15 May 2021	Box Gym, Cologne, Germany	
32	Loss	25–7	Tony Yoka	UD	10	27 Nov 2020	H Arena, Nantes, France	
31	Win	25–6	Saul Farah	TKO	1 (8), 2:15	21 Dec 2019	Wiking Box Center, Wolgast, Germany	
30	Loss	24–6	Luis Ortiz	UD	10	2 Mar 2019	Barclays Center, New York City, New York, US	
29	Win	24–5	Michael Wallisch	KO	5 (12), 2:18	15 Dec 2018	Sporthalle, Hamburg, Germany	Won vacant WBO European heavyweight title
28	Win	23–5	Tornike Puritchamiashvili	RTD	3 (8), 3:00	15 Sep 2018	ECB Boxgym, Hamburg, Germany	
27	Loss	22–5	Alexander Povetkin	UD	12	15 Dec 2017	DIVS, Yekaterinburg, Russia	For WBO International and vacant WBA International heavyweight titles
26	Win	22–4	Zine Eddine Benmakhlouf	UD	12	19 May 2017	Barclaycard Arena, Hamburg, Germany	Retained WBO European heavyweight title
25	Win	21–4	David Price	TKO	7 (12), 1:22	4 Feb 2017	Olympia, London, England	Retained WBO European heavyweight title
24	Win	20–4	Erkan Teper	SD	12	15 Oct 2016	G 18-Halle, Hamburg, Germany	Won vacant WBO European heavyweight title
23	Win	19–4	Michael Sprott	KO	1 (10), 1:51	18 Mar 2016	Circul Globus, Bucharest, Romania	
22	Win	18–4	Sherman Williams	UD	10	28 Aug 2015	Galați Skating Rink, Galați, Romania	
21	Loss	17–4	Tyson Fury	RTD	8 (12), 3:00	28 Feb 2015	The O2 Arena, London, England	For WBO International heavyweight title
20	Win	17–3	Irineu Beato Costa Junior	UD	12	31 Oct 2014	Kugelbake-Halle, Cuxhaven, Germany	
19	Win	16–3	Konstantin Airich	UD	10	11 Apr 2014	Universal Hall, Berlin, Germany	
18	Win	15–3	Kevin Johnson	UD	10	20 Dec 2013	Messe, Hamburg, Germany	
17	Win	14–3	Leif Larsen	KO	7 (12), 1:21	23 Aug 2013	Galați Skating Rink, Galați, Romania	Retained WBO European heavyweight title
16	Win	13–3	Oleksiy Mazikin	RTD	6 (12), 3:00	22 Feb 2013	Galați Skating Rink, Galați, Romania	Retained WBO European heavyweight title
15	Win	12–3	Danny Williams	TKO	4 (12), 0:57	28 Sep 2012	Sparkassen-Arena, Göttingen, Germany	Won vacant WBO European heavyweight title
14	Win	11–3	Alexander Kahl	TKO	1 (10), 1:39	30 Mar 2012	Maritim Hotel, Cologne, Germany	Retained German International heavyweight title
13	Win	10–3	Serdar Uysal	TKO	2 (10), 1:11	11 Feb 2012	Boxsporthalle Braamkamp 1, Hamburg, Germany	Won vacant German International heavyweight title
12	Win	9–3	Pavol Polakovič	TKO	2 (8), 1:22	18 Nov 2011	Kugelbake-Halle, Cuxhaven, Germany	
11	Win	8–3	Pāvels Dolgovs	UD	6	9 Apr 2011	Alsterdorfer Sporthalle, Hamburg, Germany	
10	Loss	7–3	Taras Bidenko	MD	6	4 Dec 2010	Sport and Congress Center, Schwerin, Germany	
9	Loss	7–2	Mariusz Wach	KO	6 (8), 1:56	17 Jul 2010	Sport and Congress Center, Schwerin, Germany	
8	Win	7–1	Serdar Uysal	KO	4 (6)	5 Jun 2010	Sportbox, Hamelin, Germany	
7	Win	6–1	Markus Tomala	UD	6	24 Apr 2010	Alsterdorfer Sporthalle, Hamburg, Germany	
6	Win	5–1	Remigijus Žiaušys	UD	6	9 Jan 2010	Bördelandhalle, Magdeburg, Germany	
5	Win	4–1	Hans-Joerg Blasko	TKO	2 (6), 2:32	21 Nov 2009	Sparkassen-Arena, Kiel, Germany	
4	Win	3–1	Jevgēņijs Stamburskis	TKO	2 (4), 2:28	11 Jul 2009	Nürburgring, Nürburg, Germany	
3	Win	2–1	Aleksandrs Borhovs	TKO	2 (4), 1:05	6 Jun 2009	Koenig Pilsener Arena, Oberhausen, Germany	
2	Win	1–1	Nikolay Marinov	UD	4	2 May 2009	Halle 7, Bremen, Germany	
1	Loss	0–1	Robert Gregor	RTD	1 (4), 3:00	1 Nov 2008	Koenig Pilsener Arena, Oberhausen, Germany	

Sporting positions
Regional boxing titles
Vacant Title last held by Michael Wallisch	German International heavyweight champion 11 February 2012 – December 2013; Vacated	Vacant Title next held by Francesco Pianeta
Vacant Title last held by Konstantin Airich	WBO European heavyweight champion 28 September 2012 – May 2014; Vacated	Vacant Title next held by Francesco Pianeta
Vacant Title last held by Michael Wallisch	WBO European heavyweight champion 15 October 2016 – May 2017; Vacated	Vacant Title next held by Ali Eren Demirezen
Vacant Title last held by Ali Eren Demirezen	WBO European heavyweight champion 15 December 2018 – March 2019; Vacated	Vacant Title next held by Daniel Dubois
