= Tom Schwarz =

German boxer

Personal information
- Born: May 29, 1994 (age 32) Halle, Germany
- Height: 6 ft 5 1/2 in (197 cm)
- Weight: Heavyweight

Boxing career
- Stance: Orthodox

Boxing record
- Total fights: 31
- Wins: 29
- Win by KO: 20
- Losses: 2
Medal record
Men's amateur boxing
Representing Germany
German Youth National Championships
Bronze medal – third place	2011 Straubing	Heavyweight
Silver medal – second place	2012 Cologne	Heavyweight

Tom Schwarz (born 29 May 1994) is a German professional boxer. At regional level, he has held multiple heavyweight championships, including the German title in 2018.

== Professional career ==
=== Early career ===
Schwarz' first professional fight was on 29 August 2013 when he won a 20-second KO victory over 34 year old Mario Schmidt. After amassing a record of 12–0 (8 KOs), he accepted the challenge of fellow German contender Konstantin Airich and won via unanimous decision over eight rounds.

In his 15th professional fight on 15 November 2015, Schwarz faced the powerful 20-year-old German Ilja Mezencev for the vacant WBO Youth World Champion title. In the first round, Schwarz went down against Mezencev, but recovered to win by knockout in the seventh round and captured the WBO World Youth Title.

On 4 June 2016, Schwarz fought Dennis Lewandowski for the vacant WBC World Youth Title. This fight also represented his second title defense of the WBO World Youth Title. Schwarz clearly dominated the ten-round fight and won a unanimous decision.

On 22 April 2017, Schwarz beat 40-year-old Bosnian Adnan Redzovic (18–1–0) by knockout in the second round to win the vacant WBO Inter-Continental heavyweight title.

==== Schwarz vs. Gashi ====
On 21 April 2018 Schwarz faced fellow unbeaten German Senad Gashi. In a highly controversial fight, Gashi had several head-butts that resulted in his disqualification in the sixth round of the fight. Up until the time of the stoppage, the fight had been competitive. In the same year, two knockout victories followed against the Mexican Julian Fernandez and fellow German Christian Lewandowski.

In March 2019, he defended his WBO Inter-Continental heavyweight title against Kristijan Krstacic of Croatia to record his 24th professional victory.

==== Schwarz vs. Fury ====
It was announced in March 2019 that Schwarz would take on the lineal and former unified world heavyweight champion Tyson Fury in a 12-round bout on 15 June 2019 in Las Vegas. The fight was a one-sided affair, with Schwarz outboxed by Fury, who switched to a southpaw stance after the first round. Shortly after dodging a series of punches from Schwarz, Fury knocked him to the canvas for the first time in his career with a straight right through his guard. Schwarz beat the count, but was stopped by referee Kenny Bayless shortly afterwards, losing his WBO Inter-Continental title.

=== Career from 2019 ===
In his next fight, Schwarz faced Radel Varak. Schwarz attacked Varak from the start, and managed to drop him midway through the round. Varak would beat the count, but the referee decided he had seen enough and waved the fight off.

On 28 September 2019, Schwarz rematched Ilja Mezencev, winning convincingly via sixth round corner retirement and capturing the vacant International Boxing Federation international title in the process.

==== Schwarz vs. Gashi II ====
On 3 May 2025, Schwarz competed against Gashi in a rematch, losing by unanimous decision with scores of 95–93, 99–89, and 96–92.

== Personal life ==
In April 2021, it emerged that Schwarz was on trial for allegedly punching his former partner Tessa Schimschar in the face in a restaurant car park in Lostau, Germany, in May 2020. It is alleged that Schimschar was reportedly taken to a local hospital after receiving "a massive punch on the chin, which led to multiple fractures of the lower jaw", and that she subsequently filed a charge for grievous bodily harm.

== Professional boxing record ==
31 fights	29 wins	2 losses
By knockout	20	1
By decision	8	1
By disqualification	1	0

No.	Result	Record	Opponent	Type	Round, time	Date	Location	Notes
31	Loss	29–2	Senad Gashi	UD	10	3 May 2025	Millenium Event Halle, Braunschweig, Germany	
30	Win	29–1	Christian Demaj	KO	3 (10), 1:14	25 Nov 2023	Uber Eats Music Hall, Berlin, Germany	
29	Win	28–1	Kostiantyn Dovbyshchenko	UD	10	23 Sep 2023	GETEC Arena, Magdeburg, Germany	
28	Win	27–1	Muhammed Ali Durmaz	KO	1 (8), 2:40	9 Apr 2022	Stadthalle, Falkensee, Brandenburg, Germany	
27	Win	26–1	Ilja Mezencev	RTD	6 (12), 3:00	28 Sep 2019	Stadthalle, Magdeburg, Germany	Won vacant IBF International heavyweight title
26	Win	25–1	Radek Vařák	TKO	1 (6), 1:38	17 Aug 2019	Hospůdka Eden, Ústí nad Labem, Czech Republic	
25	Loss	24–1	Tyson Fury	TKO	2 (12), 2:54	15 Jun 2019	MGM Grand Garden Arena, Paradise, Nevada, US	Lost WBO Inter-Continental heavyweight title
24	Win	24–0	Kristijan Krstacic	KO	2 (10), 2:45	2 Mar 2019	Maritim Hotel, Magdeburg, Germany	Retained WBO Inter-Continental heavyweight title
23	Win	23–0	Christian Lewandowski	TKO	6 (10), 2:15	17 Nov 2018	Aanhalt Arena, Dessau, Germany	
22	Win	22–0	Julian Fernandez	KO	2 (12), 2:33	15 Sep 2018	Stadthalle, Magdeburg, Germany	Retained WBO Inter-Continental heavyweight title
21	Win	21–0	Senad Gashi	DQ	6 (12), 1:12	21 Apr 2018	Estrel Convention Center, Neukölln, Germany	Retained WBO Inter-Continental heavyweight title and German heavyweight titles; Gashi disqualified for repeated head-butts
20	Win	20–0	Samir Nibo	TKO	4 (12) 1:50	3 Feb 2018	Erdgas Arena, Halle an der Saale, Germany	Retained WBO Inter-Continental heavyweight title; Won vacant German heavyweight title
19	Win	19–0	Adnan Redzovic	KO	2 (10) 2:54	22 Apr 2017	Messehalle, Erfurt, Germany	Won vacant WBO Inter-Continental heavyweight title
18	Win	18–0	Ivica Bacurin	UD	8	11 Mar 2017	Sportovní hala Královka, Prague, Czech Republic	
17	Win	17–0	Dennis Lewandowski	UD	10	4 Jun 2016	Seebühne Elbauenpark, Magdeburg, Germany	Retained WBO Youth heavyweight title; Won vacant WBC Youth heavyweight title
16	Win	16–0	Gogita Gorgiladze	TKO	1 (10), 2:58	5 Mar 2016	Home Monitoring Aréna, Plzeň, Czech Republic	Retained WBO Youth heavyweight title
15	Win	15–0	Ilja Mezencev	KO	7 (10), 1:25	14 Nov 2015	Anhalt Arena, Dessau, Germany	Won vacant WBO Youth heavyweight title
14	Win	14–0	Gezim Tahiri	RTD	3 (6), 3:00	19 Sep 2015	Belantis-Arena, Leipzig, Germany	
13	Win	13–0	Konstantin Airich	UD	8	11 Jul 2015	GETEC Arena, Magdeburg, Germany	
12	Win	12–0	Vaclav Pejsar	UD	6	2 May 2015	Sparkassen-Arena, Jena, Germany	
11	Win	11–0	Jakov Gospic	TKO	3 (6), 2:32	7 Mar 2015	Maritim Hotel, Magdeburg, Germany	
10	Win	10–0	Adnan Buharalija	KO	1 (6), 1:04	20 Dec 2014	Ballhaus Forum, Munich, Germany	
9	Win	9–0	Tomas Mrazek	PTS	6	2 Oct 2014	Circus Krone, Munich, Germany	
8	Win	8–0	Olegs Lopajevs	TKO	1 (6), 2:20	26 Jul 2014	Anhalt Arena, Dessau, Germany	
7	Win	7–0	Ante Verunica	TKO	1 (3), 3:00	30 May 2014	EnergieVerbund Arena, Dresden, Germany	
6	Win	6–0	Lukas Filka	TKO	1 (3), 2:04	30 May 2014	EnergieVerbund Arena, Dresden, Germany	
5	Win	5–0	Frantisek Kynkal	KO	1 (4), 2:18	28 Mar 2014	MBS Arena, Potsdam, Germany	
4	Win	4–0	Janis Ginters	UD	4	1 Mar 2014	GETEC Arena, Magdeburg, Germany	
3	Win	3–0	Edgars Kalnars	UD	4	6 Dec 2013	Brandenburg Halle, Frankfurt, Germany	
2	Win	2–0	Pavlo Nechyporenko	TKO	1 (4), 1:30	19 Oct 2013	Messehalle, Leipzig, Germany	
1	Win	1–0	Mario Schmidt	KO	1 (4), 0:20	28 Jun 2013	Maritim Hotel, Halle an der Saale, Germany	

== Pay-per-view bouts ==
Date	Fight	Network	Buys	Source(s)
15 June 2019	Tyson Fury vs. Tom Schwarz	BT Sport Box Office	Unknown	

Sporting positions
Regional boxing titles
New title	WBO Youth heavyweight champion 14 November 2015 – ? Vacated	Vacant
Vacant Title last held by Herve Hubeaux	WBC Youth heavyweight champion 4 June 2016 – July 2017; Vacated	Vacant Title next held by Daniel Dubois
Vacant Title last held by Hughie Fury	WBO Inter-Continental heavyweight champion 22 April 2017 – 15 June 2019	Succeeded by Tyson Fury
Vacant Title last held by Michael Wallisch	German heavyweight champion 3 February 2018 – September 2018; Vacated	Vacant Title next held by Boris Estenfelder
Preceded by Óscar Rivas	IBF International heavyweight champion 28 September 2019 – November 2020; Vacated	Vacant Title next held by Filip Hrgović
