= Lucian Bot =

Romanian boxer

Personal information
- Nationality: (Romania) Romanian
- Born: Lucian Tudor Bot; December 15, 1979 (age 46) Cluj-Napoca, Romania
- Height: 6 ft 3 in (1.91 m)
- Weight: Heavyweight

Boxing career
- Stance: Orthodox

Boxing record
- Total fights: 22
- Wins: 17
- Win by KO: 5
- Losses: 3
- Draws: 2
- No contests: 0

Lucian Tudor Bot (born December 15, 1979, in Cluj-Napoca), is a Romanian professional boxer in the Heavyweight division.

== Professional career ==
He turned pro in 2002.

== Professional record ==
17 Wins (5 knockouts, 12 decisions), 3 Losses, 2 Draws
Res.	Record	Opponent	Type	Rd., Time	Date	Location	Notes
Win	17-3-2	(Italy) Sergio Romano	UD	6 (6)	2018-04-28	(Romania) Sala de Sport, Sânmartin	
Loss	16-3-2	(France) Cyril Leonet	UD	12 (12)	2015-12-05	(France) Palais des Sports de Beaublanc, Limoges	For vacant IBF Mediterranean Heavyweight Title
Loss	16-2-2	(France) Faisal Ibnel Arrami	UD	10 (10)	2015-04-25	(France) Palais des Sports de Toulon, Toulon	
Draw	16-1-2	(Portugal) Antonio Sousa	SD	6 (6)	2015-02-21	(Romania) Sala Sporturilor, Cluj-Napoca	
Win	16-1-1	(Hungary) Ferenc Zsalek	PTS	6 (6)	2013-06-20	(Romania) Sala Sporturilor, Cluj-Napoca	
Win	15-1-1	(Latvia) Aleksandrs Selezens	UD	6 (6)	2012-11-29	(Romania) Sala Polivalentă, Craiova	
Loss	14-1-1	(Germany) Konstantin Airich	UD	3 (3)	2011-05-07	(United Kingdom) Alexandra Palace, London	
Win	14-0-1	(Latvia) Pāvels Dolgovs	UD	6 (6)	2010-04-10	(Romania) Rapid Sportin Hall, Bucharest	
Win	13-0-1	(Bulgaria) Yavor Marinchev	UD	(6)	2009-06-05	(Romania) Sala Rapid, Bucharest	
Win	12-0-1	(Hungary) Viktor Szalai	TKO	1 (6)	2008-12-19	(Romania) Merkur Casino, Ploiești	
Win	11-0-1	(Portugal) Alcides Dosul	UD	6 (6)	2008-04-19	(Spain) Pabellon Municipal, Vélez-Málaga	
Win	10-0-1	(Portugal) Nuno Andres da Silva	TKO	1 (6)	2007-09-28	(Spain) Valencia	
Win	9-0-1	(Latvia) Jevgenijs Stamburskis	RTD	4 (6)	2007-07-12	(Romania) Sala Sporturilor, Constanța	
Win	8-0-1	(Georgia (country)) Paata Berikashvili	SD	6 (6)	2007-04-13	(Romania) Sala Sporturilor, Drobeta-Turnu Severin	
Win	7-0-1	(Hungary) Sandor Forgacs	PTS	4 (4)	2006-07-21	(Romania) Timișoara	
Win	6-0-1	(Portugal) Jose Rodriguez	PTS	4 (4)	2006-05-19	(Romania) Brăila	
Win	5-0-1	(Romania) Valentin Marinel	TKO	3 (8)	2005-10-21	(Romania) Sala Sporturilor, Arad	
Win	4-0-1	(Romania) Romeo Ocolișan	TKO	5 (6)	2005-09-23	(Romania) Craiova	
Draw	3-0-1	(Romania) Danuț Moisa	PTS	4 (4)	2005-07-08	(Romania) Callatis, Mangalia	
Win	3-0	(Romania) Mihai Iftode	PTS	4 (4)	2005-06-03	(Romania) Sala Sporturilor, Râmnicu Vâlcea	
Win	2-0	(Romania) Romeo Ocolișan	PTS	4 (4)	2002-11-15	(Hungary) Unio Gym, Szekszárd	
Win	1-0	(Hungary) Attila Huszka	PTS	4 (4)	2002-10-25	(Hungary) Unio Gym, Szekszárd	
