= Ondřej Pála =

Czech amateur boxer (born 1984)

Personal information
- Nickname: Lirics
- Born: 20 September 1984 (age 41) Prague, Czechoslovakia
- Height: 6 ft 3 in (191 cm)
- Weight: Heavyweight

Boxing career
- Stance: Orthodox

Boxing record
- Total fights: 38
- Wins: 33
- Win by KO: 23
- Losses: 5
Medal record
Men's amateur boxing
Czech National Championships
Silver medal – second place	2004 Karvina	Super-heavyweight
Gold medal – first place	2019 Prague	Super-heavyweight

Ondřej Pála (born 20 September 1984) is a Czech former professional boxer who competed from 2005 to 2014. At regional level, he held multiple heavyweight championships, including the Czech title from 2005 to 2006. He holds a notable win over former world heavyweight champion Henry Akinwande.

== Amateur career ==
Pála started boxing at 17 under the lead of trainers Jan Balog and Antonín Hauer. His effort soon brought him the Czech Junior heavyweight title. At young age, he was also trying to compete in Muay Thai and Jiu jistu. In 2019, he returned to amateur boxing defeating Dominik Musil in the final of the Czech Championship, who is also a professional, by a second-round TKO.

== Professional career ==
He turned professional in Médea boxing team and alongside his trainer Yuri Krivoruchko, he became one of the top prospects in the heavyweight division. He soon won several belts on the national level. In 2008, he beat the former WBO heavyweight champion Henry Akinwande. After the victory over Aleksey Masikin in March 2011, he became WBO European heavyweight champion and serious contender for the world belts.

On 30 November 2013, Pala fought for the WBO and vacant WBA International titles against former world title challenger Derek Chisora at the Copper Box Arena in London. Pála was able to land heavy left hooks in the first two rounds. In round three, Chisora trapped Pála in a corner and clubbed him to the head and body with a series of powerful shots which forced Pála to turn his back from the oncoming onslaught, forcing the referee to stop the contest.

On 12 April 2014, Pala lost via third-round knockout against David Price in Esbjerg, Denmark. Price was forced to climb off the canvas after a flash knockdown in the opening round, but was able to regain his composure in the second round before flooring Pala twice in the third, forcing the referee to call a halt to the action.

== Professional boxing record ==
38 fights	33 wins	5 losses
By knockout	23	4
By decision	10	1

No.	Result	Record	Opponent	Type	Round, time	Date	Location	Notes
38	Loss	33–5	David Price	KO	3 (8), 0:33	12 Apr 2014	Blue Water Dokken, Esbjerg, Denmark	
37	Win	33–4	Roman Cherney	TKO	1 (8), 2:55	26 Feb 2014	Medea Fitness, Prague, Czech Republic	
36	Loss	32–4	Derek Chisora	TKO	3 (12), 2:25	30 Nov 2013	Copper Box Arena, London, England	For WBO International and vacant WBA International heavyweight titles
35	Win	32–3	Yuri Bihoutseu	PTS	8	19 Feb 2013	Moulin Rouge Club, Minsk, Belarus	
34	Win	31–3	Radovan Kůča	TKO	2 (8), 1:12	22 Dec 2012	Medea Fitness, Prague, Czech Republic	
33	Loss	30–3	Konstantin Airich	TKO	9 (12), 1:10	9 Mar 2012	Atatürk Spor Salonu, Tekirdağ, Turkey	Lost WBO European heavyweight title; For IBF Inter-Continental heavyweight title
32	Win	30–2	Darnell Wilson	UD	12	16 Nov 2011	Spor Salonu, Trabzon, Turkey	Retained WBO European heavyweight title
31	Win	29–2	Oleksiy Mazikin	RTD	7 (12), 3:00	1 Apr 2011	Digibet Pferdesportpark, Berlin, Germany	Won vacant WBO European heavyweight title
30	Win	28–2	Ergin Solmaz	TKO	3 (8), 1:24	3 Dec 2010	Arena Sparta, Prague, Czech Republic	
29	Win	27–2	Serhiy Babych	TKO	5 (8), 1:40	9 Apr 2010	Sport- und Kongresshalle, Schwerin, Germany	
28	Win	26–2	Robert Hawkins	UD	8	23 Jan 2010	Kugelbake-Halle, Cuxhaven, Germany	
27	Win	25–2	Oleksiy Mazikin	UD	8	24 Oct 2009	Kugelbake-Halle, Cuxhaven, Germany	
26	Win	24–2	Raman Sukhaterin	UD	8	5 Jun 2009	Hotel Pyramida, Prague, Czech Republic	
25	Win	23–2	Konstantin Airich	MD	10	6 Mar 2009	Kugelbake-Halle, Cuxhaven, Germany	
24	Win	22–2	Harry Duiven Jr	TKO	11 (12), 0:58	17 Dec 2008	Hotel Hilton, Prague, Czech Republic	Won vacant interim PABA heavyweight title
23	Win	21–2	Pavel Šiška	TKO	2 (8), 2:36	21 Nov 2008	Hotel Pyramida, Prague, Czech Republic	
22	Win	20–2	Henry Akinwande	UD	6	4 Jul 2008	Bueyuek Anadolu Hotel, Ankara, Turkey	
21	Win	19–2	Arthur Cook	TKO	8 (10), 1:28	8 Feb 2008	Shaikh Rashid Hall, Dubai	
20	Win	18–2	Viacheslav Shcherbakov	KO	3 (8), 0:35	23 Nov 2007	Top Hotel, Prague, Czech Republic	
19	Win	17–2	Aleksandrs Borhovs	RTD	2 (8), 3:00	19 Oct 2007	DK INWEST, Plzeň, Czech Republic	
18	Win	16–2	Humberto Evora	KO	4 (8), 2:20	4 Jul 2007	Top Hotel, Prague, Czech Republic	
17	Win	15–2	Piotr Sapun	KO	1 (6), 1:55	28 Apr 2007	Hotel Boby Brno, Brno, Czech Republic	
16	Win	14–2	Tomáš Mrázek	KO	5 (10), 2:54	14 Dec 2006	Hotel Pyramida, Prague, Czech Republic	Retained Czech heavyweight title
15	Win	13–2	Aleh Dubiaha	TKO	3 (6)	14 Nov 2006	Minsk, Belarus	
14	Win	12–2	Imrich Borka	TKO	3 (6)	17 Oct 2006	Hotel Pyramida, Prague, Czech Republic	
13	Loss	11–2	Denis Boytsov	TKO	5 (10), 1:16	9 Sep 2006	Bordelandhalle, Magdeburg, Germany	For vacant WBC Youth heavyweight title
12	Win	11–1	Leo Sanchez	UD	6	4 Jul 2006	Medea Gym, Prague, Czech Republic	
11	Loss	10–1	Rene Dettweiler	UD	8	22 Apr 2006	SAP Arena, Mannheim, Germany	
10	Win	10–0	Alexey Osokin	PTS	6	23 Mar 2006	Hotel Pyramida, Prague, Czech Republic	
9	Win	9–0	Aleksandrs Borhovs	RTD	7 (10), 3:00	13 Dec 2005	Hotel Pyramida, Prague, Czech Republic	Won vacant Czech and Czech International heavyweight titles
8	Win	8–0	Aliaksandr Mazaleu	TKO	1 (6)	16 Nov 2005	Hotel Pyramida, Prague, Czech Republic	
7	Win	7–0	Aleh Dubiaha	TKO	5 (6)	6 Oct 2005	Top Hotel, Prague, Czech Republic	
6	Win	6–0	Mihail Bandarenka	TKO	4 (4)	15 Sep 2005	The House of Physical Culture, Minsk, Belarus	
5	Win	5–0	Tomasz Zeprzalka	PTS	4	18 Aug 2005	KD Střelnice, Děčín, Czech Republic	
4	Win	4–0	Valeri Meierson	TKO	2 (4)	26 May 2005	Top Hotel, Prague, Czech Republic	
3	Win	3–0	Peter Simko	TKO	4 (4)	28 Apr 2005	Dům Kultury, Liberec, Czech Republic	
2	Win	2–0	Dzianis Shkalau	TKO	4 (4)	27 Mar 2005	Hotel Prague, Prague, Czech Republic	
1	Win	1–0	Uladzimir Tumanau	TKO	2 (4)	3 Mar 2005	Minsk, Belarus	

Sporting positions
Amateur boxing titles
Previous: Lubos Velecky	Czech super-heavyweight champion 2019	Next: Martin Pinc
Regional boxing titles
Vacant Title last held by Robert Sulgan	Czech heavyweight champion 13 December 2005 – October 2016; Vacated	Vacant Title next held by Vaclav Pejsar
New title	Czech International heavyweight champion 13 December 2005 – ? Vacated	Vacant
Vacant Title last held by Denis Bakhtov	PABA heavyweight champion Interim title 17 December 2008 – January 2012; Vacated	Vacant Title next held by Billy Wright
Vacant Title last held by Denis Boytsov	WBO European heavyweight champion 1 April 2011 – 9 March 2012	Succeeded by Konstantin Airich
