= Tye Fields =

American boxer

Personal information
- Nickname: Big Sky
- Born: Walter Tyeson Fields; February 8, 1975 (age 51) Missoula, Montana, U.S.
- Height: 6 ft 8 in (203 cm)
- Weight: Heavyweight

Boxing career
- Reach: 82 in (208 cm)
- Stance: Southpaw

Boxing record
- Total fights: 54
- Wins: 49
- Win by KO: 44
- Losses: 5

Walter Tyeson "Tye" Fields (born February 8, 1975) is an American former professional boxer who held the USBA heavyweight title.

== Boxing career ==
Tye Fields grew up in Beaverton, Oregon. Fields played college basketball and was a starter at forward for San Diego State University. Fields never was an amateur. Standing at 6 feet and 8 inches and weighing around 275 lbs (125 kg), the southpaw Fields was considered large even for the heavyweight division.

In his professional career he has beaten some notable opponents such as Andy Sample, Saul Montana, Bruce Seldon, Sedreck Fields, Sherman Williams, Maurice Harris, Konstantin Airich, Raphael Butler and Michael Sprott. He started his career with a streak of 17 consecutive KO victories (16 of them coming in the first round) before he suffered his first loss to Jeff Ford via a 1st-round KO. He would later avenge this defeat by knocking out Ford in a rematch, also in the 1st round. In total Fields has 26 first-round knockouts among his 49 professional victories. He has won 4 regional titles.

On June 28, 2008, Fields faced off against Monte Barrett on the Manny Pacquiao – David Díaz undercard at the Mandalay Bay in Las Vegas. Fields suffered the second defeat of his career losing via knockout after just 57 seconds of the first round when Barrett (34–6, 20 KOs) delivered a series of accurate right hands, knocking Fields down and leaving him unable to beat the referee's count.

Following the defeat to Barrett Fields rebounded with 4 straight KO victories over lowly regarded opposition before taking another step up and challenging former heavyweight title challenger Michael Grant. The fight took place on March 11, 2011 at the Planet Hollywood Resort and Casino in Las Vegas. As with his previous step up in opposition Fields came up short when he was knocked out with a single punch from Grant in the third round.

Fields took part in the Prizefighter 'International heavyweights' tournament held at Alexandra Palace in London on 7 May 2011. After winning his opening 2 bouts against Michael Sprott and Konstantin Airich he matched up against the undefeated former Cuban amateur star Mike Pérez. Perez won the tournament and the £32,000 prize money when he knocked Fields out in the first round.

On October 7, 2011, Fields defeated a strong puncher Raphael Butler (35–10, 28 KOs) from Minnesota in the 6th round via technical knockout in 10-round main event on KO Boxing's Show of Force card at the Shaw Conference Centre in Edmonton, Alberta, Canada.

On March 24, 2012, Fields faced the WBC International titleholder, #8 WBC ranked undefeated Mariusz Wach (26–0, 14 KO) from Poland. The fight was set at the Resorts Hotel & Casino in Atlantic City, New Jersey and got coverage form ESPN's Friday Night Fights. Fields lost by TKO in the 6th round. After that loss Fields retired from boxing.

== Professional boxing record ==
54 fights	49 wins	5 losses
By knockout	44	5
By decision	5	0

Result	Record	Opponent	Type	Round	Date	Location	Notes
Loss	49–5	(Poland) Mariusz Wach	TKO	6 (12)	24/03/2012	(United States) Resorts Hotel & Casino, Atlantic City, New Jersey	For WBC International heavyweight title.
Win	49–4	(United States) Raphael Butler	TKO	6 (10)	07/10/2011	Shaw Conference Centre, Edmonton, Alberta, Canada	
Win	48–4	(Canada) David Whittom	RTD	3 (8)	24/06/2011	Shaw Conference Centre, Edmonton, Alberta, Canada	
Loss	47–4	(Cuba) Mike Perez	TKO	1 (3)	07/05/2011	Alexandra Palace, Muswell Hill, London, England, United Kingdom	Prizefighter Tournament, International heavyweight final.
Win	47–3	(Germany) Konstantin Airich	KO	1 (3)	07/05/2011	Alexandra Palace, Muswell Hill, London, England, United Kingdom	Prizefighter Tournament, International heavyweight semi-final.
Win	46–3	(United Kingdom) Michael Sprott	SD	3	07/05/2011	Alexandra Palace, Muswell Hill, London, England, United Kingdom	Prizefighter Tournament, International heavyweight quarter-final.
Loss	45–3	(United States) Michael Grant	KO	3 (10)	11/03/2011	(United States) Planet Hollywood Resort & Casino, Las Vegas, Nevada	
Win	45–2	(Canada) Raymond Olubowale	TKO	3 (6)	04/02/2011	Molson Centre, Barrie, Ontario, Canada	Canadian Heavyweight title eliminator.
Win	44–2	(Canada) Ken Frank	TKO	3 (6)	19/11/2010	Shaw Conference Centre, Edmonton, Alberta, Canada	
Win	43–2	(United States) Galen Brown	TKO	3 (10)	30/10/2009	Palace Banquet Centre, Edmonton, Alberta, Canada	
Win	42–2	(United States) Nicolai Firtha	KO	6 (12)	20/06/2009	The Venue at River Cree, Enoch, Alberta, Canada	Won vacant USA Native American Boxing Council heavyweight title.
Loss	41–2	(United States) Monte Barrett	KO	1 (10)	28/06/2008	(United States) Mandalay Bay Resort & Casino, Las Vegas, Nevada	
Win	41–1	(United States) Roderick Willis	TKO	1 (10)	13/03/2008	(United States) Hard Rock Hotel and Casino, Las Vegas, Nevada	
Win	40–1	(United States) Chris Koval	TKO	1 (10)	20/12/2007	(United States) Hard Rock Hotel and Casino, Las Vegas, Nevada	
Win	39–1	(United States) Domonic Jenkins	RTD	7 (10)	09/08/2007	(United States) Hard Rock Hotel and Casino, Las Vegas, Nevada	
Win	38–1	(United States) Kendrick Releford	UD	10	25/01/2007	(United States) Orleans Hotel & Casino, Las Vegas, Nevada	
Win	37–1	(United States) Maurice Harris	RTD	4 (10)	14/07/2006	(United States) South Coast Hotel & Casino, Las Vegas, Nevada	
Win	36–1	(United States) Ed Mahone	TKO	4 (10)	24/03/2006	(United States) Orleans Hotel & Casino, Las Vegas, Nevada	
Win	35–1	(United States) Bruce Seldon	KO	2 (10)	28/10/2005	(United States) Orleans Hotel & Casino, Las Vegas, Nevada	
Win	34–1	(Mexico) Saul Montana	TKO	3 (10)	05/08/2005	(United States) Orleans Hotel & Casino, Las Vegas, Nevada	
Win	33–1	(United States) Sedreck Fields	UD	8	23/04/2005	(United States) Blackham Coliseum, Lafayette, Louisiana	
Win	32–1	(United States) Ray Lunsford	TKO	2 (8)	Feb 5, 2005	(United States) Savvis Center, St. Louis, Missouri	
Win	31–1	(Canada) Marcelo Aravena	KO	1 (8)	08/10/2004	(United States) Lakeside Casino, Osceola, Iowa	
Win	30–1	(New Zealand) Julius Long	KO	3 (12)	05/12/2003	(United States) Polk County Convention Center, Des Moines, Iowa	Won vacant WBE Continental Americas Super Heavyweight title.
Win	29–1	(The Bahamas) Sherman Williams	UD	12	02/09/2003	(United States) Mountaineer Casino, Chester, West Virginia	Won vacant USBA Heavyweight title.
Win	28–1	(Brazil) Carlos Barcelete	KO	2 (10)	10/07/2003	(United States) Sky Ute Casino, Ignacio, Colorado	
Win	27–1	(United States) Brian Sargent	TKO	2 (8)	22/02/2003	(United States) Shooting Star Casino, Mahnomen, Minnesota	
Win	26–1	(United States) Marvin Hill	TKO	1 (4)	04/10/2002	(United States) Edgewater Hotel & Casino, Laughlin, Nevada	
Win	25–1	(United States) Francis Royal	TKO	3 (6)	08/08/2002	(United States) Centennial Garden Arena, Bakersfield, California	
Win	24–1	(United States) Jose Flores	TKO	1 (6)	10/05/2002	(United States) Lakeside Casino, Osceola, Iowa	
Win	23–1	(United States) Joe Lenhart	UD	5	30/01/2002	(United States) Level Nightclub, Miami Beach, Florida	
Win	22–1	(United States) Jeff Ford	KO	1 (?)	14/08/2001	(United States) Mountaineer Casino, Chester, West Virginia	
Win	21–1	(United States) Ed White	KO	1 (4)	17/07/2001	(United States) State Fairgrounds, Des Moines, Iowa	
Win	20–1	(United States) George Chamberlain	TKO	1 (?)	01/06/2001	(United States) Civic Center, Bismarck, North Dakota	
Win	19–1	(United States) Undra Hawkins	TKO	1 (?)	30/03/2001	(United States) Tama, Iowa	
Win	18–1	(United States) Jason Nicholson	TKO	2 (?)	20/03/2001	(United States) Central Plaza Hotel, Oklahoma City	
Loss	17–1	(United States) Jeff Ford	KO	1 (4)	31/01/2001	(United States) Ameristar Casino, Kansas City, Missouri	
Win	17–0	(United States) Andy Sample	KO	1 (10)	01/12/2000	(United States) Grand Victoria Casino, Rising Sun, Indiana	Won USBA Regional Heavyweight title.
Win	16–0	(Mexico) Nick Flores	TKO	1 (8)	13/10/2000	(United States) Harvey's Casino, Council Bluffs, Iowa	
Win	15–0	(United States) Greg Suttington	TKO	2 (6)	29/09/2000	(United States) Station Casino, Missouri, Missouri	
Win	14–0	(United States) Dan Kosmicki	TKO	1 (6)	15/09/2000	(United States) Orleans Hotel & Casino, Las Vegas, Nevada	
Win	13–0	(United States) George Chamberlain	TKO	1 (10)	25/08/2000	(United States) Convention Center, Des Moines, Iowa	Won vacant USA Iowa State Heavyweight title.
Win	12–0	(United States) Curtis McDorman	KO	1 (?)	28/07/2000	(United States) Orleans Hotel & Casino, Las Vegas, Nevada	
Win	11–0	(United States) Kevin Rosier	TKO	1 (4)	28/04/2000	(United States) Foxwoods Resort, Mashantucket, Connecticut	
Win	10–0	(United States) Travis Fulton	KO	1 (4)	17/02/2000	(United States) River Center, Davenport, Iowa	
Win	9–0	(Puerto Rico) Richard Davis	KO	1 (4)	10/02/2000	(United States) Harvey's Casino, Council Bluffs, Iowa	
Win	8–0	(United States) Harold Johnson	KO	1 (4)	24/11/1999	(United States) Fiesta Palace, Waukegan, Illinois	
Win	7–0	(United States) Brian McNeff	TKO	1 (4)	19/10/1999	(United States) KC Market Center, Missouri, Missouri	
Win	6–0	(United States) Chris McCarl	KO	1 (4)	23/07/1999	(United States) Ice Arena, Des Moines, Iowa	
Win	5–0	(United States) Justin Wills	KO	1 (?)	01/06/1999	(United States) Des Moines, Iowa	
Win	4–0	(United States) Darryl Becker	TKO	1 (4)	27/04/1999	(United States) Davenport, Iowa	
Win	3–0	(United States) Eric Graham	KO	1 (4)	17/04/1999	(United States) Coliseum, Marshalltown, Iowa	
Win	2–0	(United States) Richard Slack	TKO	1 (4)	20/03/1999	(United States) La Mesa Restaurant, Council Bluffs, Iowa	
Win	1–0	(United States) Gerald Hill	TKO	1 (4)	10/02/1999	(United States) Meskwaki Casino, Tama, Iowa	
