= Mariusz Kolodziej =

American businessman and boxing promoter (born 1966)

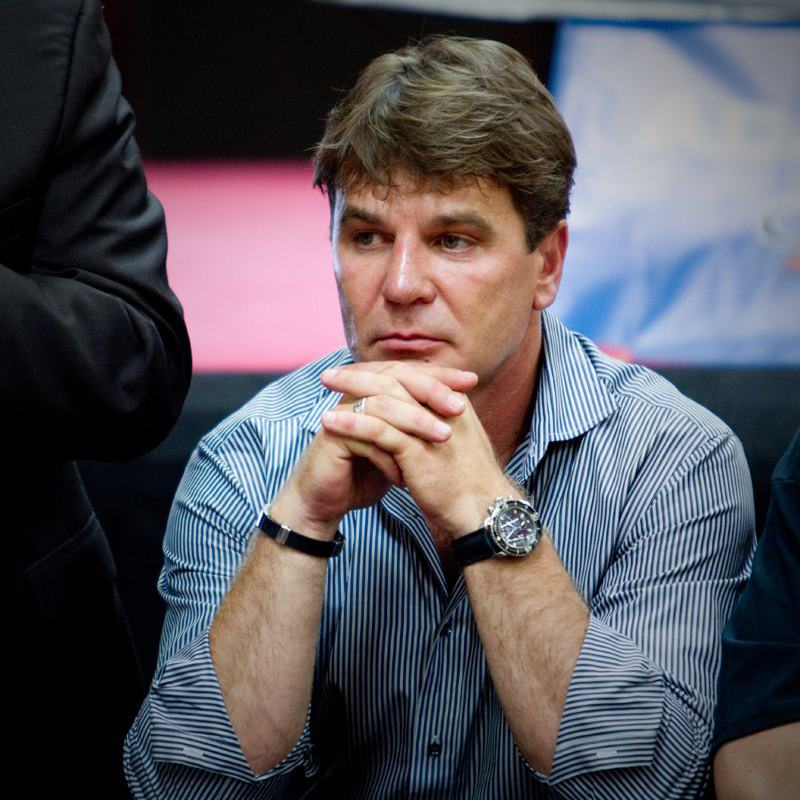
- Born: October 3, 1966 (age 59); Rzeszów, Poland
- Occupations: Boxing promoter, entrepreneur
- Spouse: Katarzyna Kolodziej
- Website: www.hudsonbread.com

Mariusz Kolodziej (born October 3, 1966) is a Polish-American entrepreneur and boxing promoter, living and working in the United States.

== Early life and education ==
Kolodziej was born on October 3, 1966, in Rzeszów, Poland, as a son of Adolf and Aleksandra. He spent his early childhood in the small town of Błażowa, Poland, where he attended elementary school. His mother Aleksandra, as a director of a local high school, always emphasized the importance of good education. His father Adolf, who ran several different businesses at that time, focused on teaching his son the value of hard work. After graduating high school, Kolodziej applied to the prestigious Naval Academy in Gdynia, Poland. He was accepted in 1985, and began his four-year adventure with the Navy that included studying both in Poland and in the former Soviet Union. After leaving the Naval Academy in 1989, he decided to continue his educational experience. He moved back to Rzeszów, and started his Master's program at the UMCS Law School.

Kolodziej has been a resident of Saddle River, New Jersey.

== Career ==
=== Hudson Bread ===
Following his law and administration studies in his homeland Poland, he emigrated to New York City at the age of 24, and earned his starting capital in the real estate business. Having been exposed to the fine art of bread making in his father's bakery in Poland, Kolodziej acquired the passion for and understanding of this craftsmanship at a very young age. His enthusiasm for the trade escalated each year, as did the desire to start a bakery of his own. Kolodziej was able to realize his dream in 1996 on the shore of the Hudson River in Jersey City, New Jersey. He analyzed the market in New York and decided in favor of a specialty European-style bakery adapted to the requirements of the American food service companies with their indulgent sandwich culture and aimed at the taste profile of New York consumers. With time, it became the sole supplier of bread to many upscale restaurants and hotels in New York City, and the entire East Coast. Hudson Bread artisan bakery, now located in North Bergen, New Jersey, creates over 350 different kinds of bread daily. Kolodziej created many of the recipes himself, finding inspirations during his world travels.

Hudson Bread is now also a café business. Hudson Bread Café is the brainchild of Mariusz and his wife Katarzyna Kolodziej who serve as president and owner of Hudson Bread Café, respectively.

== Sports patronage ==
Kolodziej has always supported various sports initiatives, including soccer teams, marathon runners and car racing. At some point, he decided to get involved with boxing. For several years he was sponsoring one of the most famous Polish professional boxers, Tomasz Adamek. In 2010 Kolodziej became a licensed boxing promoter, and opened his own Global Boxing Gym in North Bergen, New Jersey. North Bergen, New Jersey–based Global Boxing Promotions was established in 2010. Global Boxing has developed the Polish community into one of the fastest growing fan bases in boxing in the United States. In its first year of promoting, Global Boxing set a record by selling out the Mohegan Sun Arena in Connecticut during the "November Reign" show. On September 29, 2012, Global Boxing Promotions continued its success by filling up the arena at the Resorts Hotel & Casino for the "Global Boxing Series". Within just two years, Kolodziej led one of his fighters, Mariusz Wach, to a world title bout against Wladimir Klitschko. The rest of the team, including four Polish prospects, is also on their way to the top. In December 2011, Kolodziej started a new project; he opened the Global Boxing Foundation, which aims to help young amateur boxers succeed in their professional careers. Since that time, many talented amateurs and professional boxers from all over the world have been offered help by Kolodziej and his team.

== Awards and recognitions ==
1. Outstanding Pole Abroad 2012 – awarded by the Consulate General of Poland in New York City.
2. Promoter of The Year 2012 – awarded by the editors of bokser.org.
3. Man of the Year 2012 – awarded by the Pulaski Association of Business and Professional Men, Inc.
4. Gold Cross of Merit 2015 – awarded by the President of Poland for exemplary public service or humanitarian work that goes above and beyond the call of duty
