= Fabio Tuiach =

Italian boxer

- Born: June 4, 1980 (age 46); Trieste, Italy
- Other names: The Hitting Angel
- Height: 1.88 m (6 ft 2 in)
- Division: Heavyweight; Cruiserweight
- Style: Boxing
- Stance: Orthodox
- Fighting out of: Trieste, Italy
- Team: Lion Gym Trieste; Club Sportivo Trieste Pugilato
- Years active: 19 (Boxing 1996–present Kickboxing: 2009-2011)

Professional boxing record
- Total: 36
- Wins: 29
- By knockout: 16
- Losses: 7
- By knockout: 5

Kickboxing record
- Total: 4
- Wins: 2
- By knockout: 1
- Losses: 2

Fabio Tuiach (born 4 June 1980) is an Italian former professional boxer and kickboxer who competed from 2004 to 2019. At regional level, he held the Italian cruiserweight title in 2006, the Italian heavyweight title twice between 2014 and 2018, and challenged once for the European cruiserweight title in 2008.

== Early life and amateur career ==
Tuiach was born in Trieste, Italy and he grew up in Rozzol Melara, a quartier in the north of the city. He began boxing at 16 years old, under the guidance of the former Italian featherweight champion Nevio Carbi. He made his debut as a cruiserweight with a win in 80 seconds. He won fifteen matches in a row by KO or TKO, afterwards he climbed in the light heavyweight category where he won the Italian Juniores Title. He was called up to the Italian National Team and in 2000 he won the Italian Second-Class Super Heavyweight Title and in the next year he loss against Roberto Cammarelle at the All-Italy Boxing Championship final.

In 2003 he turned professional, he closed his amateur career with 60 matches fought, 45 won, including 13 by KO.

== Professional career ==
Tuiach made his professional debut on 30 April 2004 in Bergamo and he won by KO against the Slovak Marian Miko.

On 10 February 2006, with 11 matches won, 7 by KO, he got the chance to fight for the Italian Title and he faced the Italian champion Paolo Ferrara in Trieste. He won by KO at the seventh round after an intense match, bringing back in Trieste a title that was missing for thirty years, when was won by his first master Nevio Carbi in the featherweight division.

In 2007 he won the IBF Mediterranean cruiserweight title beating by KO the Frenchman Enis Boussandel. In 2008 a family bereavement upset his life and his career resented of that.

On 25 October 2008, he fought for the European title, but he fell to the mat under the punches of the champion Marco Huck. At the visits of reinstatement the Italian federation denied his medical fitness, in 2009 he repeated the tests but the outcome was the same: after this disappointment, he left boxing and started the practice of kickboxing. In this short period he fought 4 matches, 2 wins (1 by KO) and 2 losses, he left definitively the ring in 2011.

He returned in boxing on July 14, 2012, fighting against the Hungarian Sandor Balagh after 4 years of inactivity, going up into the heavyweight division.

In August 2013 he issued the challenge to the Italian title but he lost by TKO at the sixth round against Matteo Modugno. In December 2014 he finally won the Italian Heavyweight Title beating Gianluca Mandras, disqualified at the ninth round, in Trieste.

He lost the Italian heavyweight title on June 13, 2015 in Brescia. Afterwards he had to leave the title to the former Italian Cruiserweight champion Salvatore Erittu.

== Championships ==
=== Professional ===
- 2014 Italian Heavyweight Title
- 2007 I.B.F. Mediterranean Cruiserweight Title.
- 2006 Italian Light Heavyweight Title.

=== Amatorial ===
- 2001 All-Italy Boxing Championship Heavyweight Division Runner-up.
- 2000 Italian Second-Class Super Heavyweight Title.
- Italian Juniores Light Heavyweight Champion.

== Boxing record ==
27 Wins (15 knockouts, 12 decisions), 4 Losses (2 knockouts, 2 decisions), 0 Draws
Res.	Record	Opponent	Type	Rd., Time	Date	Location	Notes
Loss	27–5	(Germany) Michael Wallisch	TKO	2 (12)	2015-07-11	(Germany) GETEC Arena, Magdeburg, Sachsen-Anhalt.	For WBO European heavyweight title
Loss	27–4	(Italy) Salvatore Erittu	UD	9 (10)	2015-06-13	(Italy) Pala San Filippo, Brescia, Lombardy.	Lost Italian heavyweight title
Win	27–3	(Italy) Gianluca Mandras	DQ	9 (10)	2014-12-13	(Italy) Trieste, Friuli-Venezia Giulia	Won vacant Italian heavyweight title
Win	26–3	(Croatia) Hrvoje Kisicek	PTS	6	2014-10-11	(Italy) Polisportivo Comunale, Manzano, Friuli-Venezia Giulia	
Loss	25–3	(Italy) Matteo Modugno	TKO	6 (10)	2013-08-23	(Italy) Piazza Vittoria, Salò, Lombardy	For Italian heavyweight title
Win	25–2	(Hungary) Sandor Balogh	RTD	3 (6), 3:00	2013-04-27	(Italy) PalaChiarbola, Trieste, Friuli-Venezia Giulia	
Win	24–2	(Croatia) Kreso Bogdanović	RTD	3 (6), 3:00	2012-12-01	(Italy) Palazzetto dello Sport, Rezzato, Lombardy	
Win	23–2	(Hungary) Sandor Balogh	PTS	6	2012-07-14	(Italy) PalaCarnera, Udine, Friuli-Venezia Giulia	
Loss	22–2	(Germany) Marco Huck	TKO	2 (12), 2:22	2008-10-25	(Germany) Weser-Ems-Halle, Oldenburg, Niedersachsen	For European cruiserweight title
Win	22–1	(Nicaragua) Walter Palacios	PTS	8 (8)	2008-08-28	(Italy) Lungolago Zanardelli, Tuscolano Maderno, Lombardy	
Win	21–1	(Croatia) Drazen Ordulj	TKO	3 (8)	2008-05-16	(Italy) PalaChiarbola, Trieste, Friuli-Venezia Giulia	
Win	20–1	(Czech Republic) Tomáš Mrázek	TKO	2 (6), 2:57	2008-03-05	(Italy) Nelson Mandela Forum, Florence, Tuscany	
Win	19–1	(France) Enis Boussandel	KO	2 (12)	2007-12-12	(Italy) Rezzato, Lombardy	Won vacant IBF Mediterranean cruiserweight title
Win	18–1	(Italy) David Vicena	KO	2 (6)	2007-07-27	(Italy) Trieste, Friuli-Venezia Giulia	
Win	17–1	(Slovakia) Slavomir Selicky	KO	2 (6)	2007-07-01	(Italy) Piazza della Loggia, Brescia, Lombardy	
Win	16–1	(Italy) Paolo Ferrara	PTS	6	2007-05-18	(Italy) PalaCarnera, Udine, Friuli-Venezia Giulia	
Win	15–1	(Italy) David Vicena	PTS	6	2007-03-02	(Italy) Nelson Mandela Forum, Florence, Tuscany	
Win	14–1	(Italy) Simone Loschi	TKO	2 (6)	2006-10-21	(Italy) Palasport Viale Tiziano, Rome, Lazio	
Loss	13–1	(Czech Republic) Pavol Polakovič	UD	12	2006-08-11	(Italy) Toscolano Maderno, Lombardy	For vacant IBF International cruiserweight title
Win	13–0	(Germany) Rene Huebner	TKO	5 (8)	2006-05-20	(Italy) Piazza di Siena, Rome, Lazio	
Win	12–0	(Italy) Paolo Ferrara	TKO	7 (10)	2006-02-10	(Italy) Palazzetto dello Sport, Chiarbola, Friuli-Venezia Giulia	Won Italian light heavyweight title
Win	11–0	(Italy) Massimiliano Costantino	TKO	5 (6)	2005-10-14	(Italy) Rivarolo Canavese, Piedmont	
Win	10–0	(Italy) Massimiliano Costantino	PTS	6	2005-07-16	(Italy) Stadio della Pallacorda, Rome, Lazio	
Win	9–0	(Burkina Faso) Roger Foe	DQ	2 (6)	2005-05-13	(Italy) Palazzetto di Via Alberici, Piacenza, Emilia-Romagna	
Win	8–0	(Hungary) Otto Nemeth	TKO	1 (6)	2005-03-18	(Italy) Palasport, Rivarolo Canavese, Piedmont	
Win	7–0	(Romania) Marian Tudor	TKO	1 (6)	2005-01-21	(Italy) Palasport, Rivarolo Canavese, Piedmont	
Win	6–0	(Serbia) Branko Gacević	KO	2 (6)	2004-12-10	(Italy) Palazzetto di Via Alberici, Piacenza, Emilia-Romagna	
Win	5–0	(Croatia) Siniša Puljak	PTS	6	2004-10-29	(Italy) Ariano nel Polesine, Veneto	
Win	4–0	(Hungary) Gabor Farkas	PTS	6	2007-08-06	(Italy) Palermo, Sicily	
Win	3–0	(Democratic Republic of the Congo) Leon Nzama	PTS	6	2004-07-16	(Italy) Toscolano Maderno, Lombardy	
Win	2–0	(France) Mohammed Quarab	TKO	1 (6)	2004-05-22	(Italy) Palazzolo sull'Oglio, Lombardy	
Win	1–0	(Slovenia) Marian Miko	TKO	2 (6)	2004-04-30	(Italy) Bergamo, Lombardy	

== Kickboxing record ==
Kickboxing Record
2 Wins, 2 Losses, 0 Draws
Date	Result	Opponent	Event	Location	Method	Round	Time
2011-02-25	Loss	(Slovenia) Rok Štrucl	Trieste Fight Night	Trieste, Italy	Extra Round Decision	4	3:00
2010-11-13	Win	(Bosnia and Herzegovina) Adis Dadović	Trieste Fight Night	Trieste, Italy	KO	2	1:18
2009-08-17	Loss	(Italy) Fabio Giannasi	Gotti Promotions	Trieste, Italy	Retirement	2	0:00
2009-04-24	Win	(France) Thomas Joaquin	Gotti Promotions	Trieste, Italy	Decision (Unanimous)	3	3:00
Legend: Win Loss Draw/No contest Notes
