= Kevin Johnson (boxer) =

American boxer (born 1979)

Personal information
- Nickname: Kingpin
- Born: Kevin Blue Johnson; September 7, 1979 (age 47) Asbury Park, New Jersey, U.S.
- Height: 6 ft 3 in (191 cm)
- Weight: Heavyweight

Boxing career
- Reach: 82 in (208 cm)
- Stance: Orthodox

Boxing record
- Total fights: 60
- Wins: 36
- Win by KO: 20
- Losses: 22
- Draws: 2
Medal record
Men's amateur boxing
New Jersey Golden Gloves
Gold medal – first place	2002 New Jersey	Heavyweight

Kevin Vladimirovich Johnson (born September 7, 1979) is an American-Russian former professional boxer who competed from 2003 to 2023. He challenged once for the WBC heavyweight title in 2009. He holds notable wins over former world champions Bruce Seldon and Yoan Pablo Hernández.

== Amateur career ==
Johnson started boxing at the age of 18, Johnson was trained by coach Victor Lashley . He was an unheralded amateur with only a 14–2 record but won the New Jersey Golden Gloves.

== Professional career ==
=== Early career ===
He turned pro in 2002. After only three fights he fought an undefeated Olympian in Timur Ibragimov, who already had 13 victories holding him to a draw. Three fights later in 2004 he handily beat well-known clubfighter Robert Wiggins, who was 19–3–1 at the time. After being somewhat inactive in 2005 he had another good win over a clubfighter in Robert Hawkins 2006 against whom he won a shutout decision. He was regarded by some as America's best heavyweight prospect largely to his dominant jab.

On April 18, 2008, at the Buffalo Run Casino in Miami, Oklahoma, Johnson defeated Terry Smith by unanimous decision. Johnson used his long jab and hand speed to maneuver his way around the aggression of Smith. Johnson scored the biggest win of his career with a TKO victory over a badly faded Bruce Seldon in September 2008 in Atlantic City. Johnson defeated Devin Vargas on May 15, 2009. Johnson was declared winner by technical knockout after Vargas's corner threw in the towel early in the sixth round. With the win, Johnson earned a shot at the world title.

=== WBC heavyweight title challenge ===
==== Johnson vs. Klitschko ====
On December 12, 2009 Johnson took on Vitali Klitschko for the WBC Heavyweight title in Bern, Switzerland. Klitschko was never troubled by Johnson in front of an 18,000-strong crowd. The previously unbeaten Johnson was unable to land his trademark jab on the 6 ft 7in Vitali, and went on to lose every round of the contest to the Ukrainian.

After the loss to Klitschko, Johnson racked up victories against Charles Davis and Julius Long, before signing up for in Eddie Hearn's Prizefighter tournament in the UK during which he lost in the final against Tor Hamer. Johnson would settle in a gatekeeper role after the tournament, dropping decisions to Tyson Fury, Christian Hammer, Mahmoud Charr and Derek Chisora, but beating Solomon Haumono.

On May 30, 2015, Johnson lost to undefeated Anthony Joshua by second-round knockout, after having been knocked down twice in the first round. This was Johnson's first stoppage loss. Johnson announced his retirement from boxing after the loss to Joshua.

He returned in 2017 with a points win over journeyman Jamal Woods and later challenged Kubrat Pulev for the WBA Inter-Continental title. Despite being outboxed from the start, he managed to take Pulev 12 rounds. Johnson lost a unanimous decision 120–108, 120–108, and 119–109.

On October 14, 2017, Johnson beat Francesco Pianeta via technical knockout in the seventh round.

After three consecutive losses following his Pianeta victory, Johnson recorded his 33rd and 34th wins against Haris Radmilovic, with a pair of third-round technical knockout victories both coming against Radmilovic in December 2018.

Five consecutive losses later, Johnson scored a seventh-round knockout victory against former IBF and The Ring cruiserweight champion Yoan Pablo Hernández on August 22, 2020.

The following year, Johnson returned to the ring on June 5, 2021, to face undefeated Agit Kabayel. Johnson suffered the 18th loss of his career, losing a unanimous decision with scores of 118–111, 118–111, and 119–110.

He lost to Mark Petrovskii via majority decision over six rounds in Moscow, Russia, on August 18, 2023.

== Personal life ==
In 2023 he settled in Samara, Russia, and in January 2024 he was granted Russian citizenship. He also declared that he will use 'Vladimirovich' as his patronymic to honor Vladimir Putin.

== Professional boxing record ==
60 fights	36 wins	22 losses
By knockout	20	3
By decision	16	19
Draws	2	

No.	Result	Record	Opponent	Type	Round, time	Date	Location	Notes
60	Loss	36–22–2	Mark Petrovskii	MD	6	Aug 18, 2023	Moscow, Russia	
59	Win	36–21–2	Aydin Yildirim	TKO	5 (8), 2:58	Apr 8, 2023	Rayong Fight Club, Lauingen, Germany	
58	Draw	35–21–2	Andre Bunga	SD	8	Sep 24, 2022	Kickboxen-Team-Xander, Cologne, Germany	
57	Loss	35–21–1	Victor Vykhryst	PTS	8	Aug 27, 2022	ECB Boxgym, Hamburg, Germany	
56	Loss	35–20–1	Ihor Shevadzutskyi	PTS	8	Aug 13, 2022	ECB Boxgym, Hamburg, Germany	
55	Loss	35–19–1	Ali Eren Demirezen	UD	8	May 28, 2022	Die Bucht, Hamburg, Germany	
54	Loss	35–18–1	Agit Kabayel	UD	12	Jun 5, 2021	Seebühne Elbauenpark, Magdeburg, Germany	For WBA Continental heavyweight title
53	Win	35–17–1	Yoan Pablo Hernández	KO	7 (8), 2:04	Aug 22, 2020	Seebühne Elbauenpark, Magdeburg, Germany	
52	Loss	34–17–1	Mariusz Wach	UD	10	Jun 12, 2020	Palac w Konarach, Konary, Poland	For vacant Republic of Poland International heavyweight title
51	Loss	34–16–1	Martin Bakole	TKO	5 (8), 0:58	Oct 19, 2019	Utilita Arena, Newcastle, England	
50	Loss	34–15–1	Oleksandr Zakhozhyi	UD	8	Oct 11, 2019	Palazzohalle, Karlsruhe, Germany	
49	Loss	34–14–1	Shigabudin Aliev	UD	10	Jul 22, 2019	Red Square, Moscow, Russia	
48	Loss	34–13–1	Nathan Gorman	PTS	10	Mar 23, 2019	Leicester Arena, Leicester, England	
47	Win	34–12–1	Haris Radmilović	TKO	3 (8), 1:12	Dec 22, 2018	Challenge Club Arena, Offenbach, Germany	
46	Loss	33–12–1	Filip Hrgović	UD	8	Dec 8, 2018	Dražen Petrović Basketball Hall, Zagreb, Croatia	
45	Win	33–11–1	Haris Radmilović	TKO	3 (8), 2:17	Dec 1, 2018	Glaspalast, Dessau, Germany	
44	Loss	32–11–1	Daniel Dubois	PTS	10	Oct 6, 2018	Leicester Arena, Leicester, England	
43	Loss	32–10–1	Andy Ruiz Jr.	UD	10	Jul 7, 2018	Save Mart Center, Fresno, California, U.S.	
42	Loss	32–9–1	Petar Milas	TKO	8 (10), 0:45	Mar 10, 2018	Maritim Berghotel, Braunlage, Germany	Lost IBO International heavyweight title
41	Win	32–8–1	Francesco Pianeta	TKO	7 (10), 2:48	Oct 14, 2017	Ballhausforum, Unterschleißheim, Germany	Won IBO International heavyweight title
40	Win	31–8–1	Engin Solmaz	RTD	2 (6), 3:00	Aug 26, 2017	Fitness Club Aiko Steffen, Halberstadt, Germany	
39	Loss	30–8–1	Kubrat Pulev	UD	12	Apr 28, 2017	Arena Armeec, Sofia, Bulgaria	For WBA Inter-Continental heavyweight title
38	Win	30–7–1	Terrell Jamal Woods	UD	6	Mar 11, 2017	Metroplex, Little Rock, Arkansas, U.S.	
37	Loss	29–7–1	Anthony Joshua	TKO	2 (10), 1:22	May 30, 2015	The O2 Arena, London, England	For WBC International heavyweight title
36	Loss	29–6–1	Mahmoud Charr	UD	10	Apr 12, 2014	Telekom Dome, Bonn, Germany	
35	Loss	29–5–1	Derek Chisora	UD	12	Feb 15, 2014	Copper Box Arena, London, England	For WBA and WBO International heavyweight titles
34	Loss	29–4–1	Christian Hammer	UD	10	Dec 20, 2013	Messehallen, Hamburg, Germany	
33	Win	29–3–1	Solomon Haumono	KO	10 (12), 2:53	Apr 28, 2013	Convention and Exhibition Centre, Melbourne, Australia	Won WBC-OPBF heavyweight title
32	Loss	28–3–1	Tyson Fury	UD	12	Dec 1, 2012	Odyssey Arena, Belfast, Northern Ireland	
31	Loss	28–2–1	Tor Hamer	UD	3	Jun 20, 2012	York Hall, London, England	Prizefighter 25: heavyweight final
30	Win	28–1–1	Albert Sosnowski	SD	3	Jun 20, 2012	York Hall, London, England	Prizefighter 25: heavyweight semi-final
29	Win	27–1–1	Noureddine Meddoun	TKO	1 (3), 2:57	Jun 20, 2012	York Hall, London, England	Prizefighter 25: heavyweight quarter-final
28	Win	26–1–1	Alex Leapai	TKO	9 (12), 2:22	Apr 1, 2012	Doomben Racecourse, Brisbane, Australia	Won IBF Australasian heavyweight title
27	Win	25–1–1	Harold Sconiers	TKO	1 (6), 2:18	Jun 25, 2011	Elder Entertainment Center, Decatur, Georgia, U.S.	
26	Win	24–1–1	Julius Long	UD	8	Jan 22, 2011	The Greenbrier, White Sulphur Springs, West Virginia, U.S.	
25	Win	23–1–1	Charles Davis	KO	4 (8), 2:54	Oct 29, 2010	Blake Hotel, Charlotte, North Carolina, U.S.	
24	Loss	22–1–1	Vitali Klitschko	UD	12	Dec 12, 2009	PostFinance Arena, Bern, Switzerland	For WBC heavyweight title
23	Win	22–0–1	Devin Vargas	TKO	6 (10), 2:23	May 15, 2009	Broadway by the Bay, Atlantic City, New Jersey, U.S.	
22	Win	21–0–1	Matthew Greer	TKO	3 (10), 2:26	Nov 7, 2008	Bally's, Atlantic City, New Jersey, U.S.	
21	Win	20–0–1	Bruce Seldon	TKO	5 (10), 0:28	Sep 5, 2008	Bally's, Atlantic City, New Jersey, U.S.	
20	Win	19–0–1	Terry Smith	UD	10	Apr 18, 2008	Buffalo Run Casino, Miami, Oklahoma, U.S.	
19	Win	18–0–1	Jermell Barnes	UD	8	Dec 5, 2007	Hard Rock Live, Hollywood, Florida, U.S.	
18	Win	17–0–1	Andrew Greeley	UD	6	Nov 9, 2007	Paradise Theater, New York City, New York, U.S.	
17	Win	16–0–1	Damian Wills	UD	10	Aug 3, 2007	Far West Rodeo, Doraville, Georgia, U.S.	
16	Win	15–0–1	Ron Guerrero	UD	8	Jun 9, 2007	Convention Center, Hartford, Connecticut, U.S.	
15	Win	14–0–1	Curtis Taylor	KO	1 (6)	Mar 29, 2007	The Plex, North Charleston, South Carolina, U.S.	
14	Win	13–0–1	Charles Davis	UD	10	Dec 8, 2006	Paradise Theater, New York City, New York, U.S.	
13	Win	12–0–1	Michael Rhodes	UD	6	Nov 10, 2006	Birchwood Manor, Whippany, New Jersey, U.S.	
12	Win	11–0–1	Demetrice King	UD	6	Oct 11, 2006	Westchester County Center, White Plains, New York, U.S.	
11	Win	10–0–1	Daniel Bispo	UD	10	Jun 10, 2006	Boardwalk Hall, Atlantic City, New Jersey, U.S.	
10	Win	9–0–1	Robert Hawkins	UD	8	Mar 31, 2006	Mohegan Sun Arena, Montville, Connecticut, U.S.	
9	Win	8–0–1	Robert Kooser	TKO	1 (6), 1:16	Jan 27, 2006	Tropicana Casino & Resort, Atlantic City, New Jersey, U.S.	
8	Win	7–0–1	William Cook	UD	8	Jan 8, 2005	Emerald Queen Casino, Tacoma, Washington, U.S.	
7	Win	6–0–1	Karl Evans	TKO	1 (6), 1:31	Nov 6, 2004	Glendale Arena, Phoenix, Arizona, U.S.	
6	Win	5–0–1	Robert Wiggins	UD	8	Sep 30, 2004	Mohegan Sun Arena, Montville, Connecticut, U.S.	
5	Win	4–0–1	DeSean Harper	TKO	4 (6)	Jul 28, 2004	Orange County Fairgrounds, Middletown, New York, U.S.	
4	Draw	3–0–1	Timur Ibragimov	UD	4	Jun 17, 2004	Harrah's Laughlin, Laughlin, Nevada, U.S.	
3	Win	3–0	Elfair McKnight	UD	4	Jul 13, 2003	Cedar Beach, Allentown, Pennsylvania, U.S.	
2	Win	2–0	William Bolar	KO	1 (4)	Apr 24, 2003	Days Inn, Allentown, Pennsylvania, U.S.	
1	Win	1–0	Stanford Brisbone	TKO	4 (4), 2:36	Feb 13, 2003	Days Inn, Allentown, Pennsylvania, U.S.	

== Exhibition boxing record ==
1 fight	1 win	0 losses
By decision	1	0

No.	Result	Record	Opponent	Type	Round, time	Date	Location	Notes
1	Win	1–0	Viacheslav Datsik	SD	3	Mar 31, 2023	Dynamo Volleyball Arena, Moscow, Russia	

== Viewership ==
=== Germany ===
Date	Fight	Billing	Viewership (avg.)	Network	Source(s)
12 December 2009	Vitali Klitschko vs. Kevin Johnson	Klitschko Time	11,160,000	RTL Television	
	Total viewership		11,160,000		

Sporting positions
Regional boxing titles
Preceded by Alex Leapai	IBF Australasian heavyweight champion April 1, 2012 – June 2012; Vacated	Vacant Title next held by Lucas Browne
Preceded by Solomon Haumono	OPBF heavyweight champion April 28, 2013 – August 2015; Vacated	Vacant Title next held by Joseph Parker
Preceded by Francesco Pianeta	IBO International heavyweight champion October 14, 2017 – March 10, 2018	Succeeded by Petar Milas
