= Oleksiy Mazikin =

Ukrainian boxer (born 1975)

Oleksiy Masikin
Personal information
- Nationality: Ukrainian
- Born: 16 February 1975 (age 51) Kharkiv, Kharkiv Oblast, Ukrainian SSR, Soviet Union
- Height: 1.96 m (6 ft 5 in)
- Weight: Heavyweight

Boxing career

Boxing record
- Total fights: 31
- Wins: 14
- Win by KO: 4
- Losses: 15
- Draws: 2
Medal record
World Amateur Championships
Silver medal – second place	2001 Belfast	Super Heavyweight

Oleksiy Mazikin (born 16 February 1975) is a Ukrainian former professional boxer who competed from 2005 to 2019. As an amateur, he won a silver medal at the 2001 World Championships.

== Amateur career ==
Mazikin was a successful amateur but kept losing to southpaws. At the 2000 Olympics he lost to southpaw Audley Harrison, at the World Championships 2001 where he achieved his best result beating Alexander Povetkin 36–30 and Pedro Carrión, he lost the final to southpaw Ruslan Chagaev.

At the Olympics 2004 he beat Aliaksandr Apanasionak and was defeated by southpaw Roberto Cammarelle.

=== Highlights ===
- 2000 competed as a Super Heavyweight at the 2000 Olympics in Sydney.
  - Defeated Angus Shelford (New Zealand) PTS (19-5)
  - Lost to Audley Harrison (Great Britain) PTS (9-19)
- 2001 2nd place at the World Championships in Belfast
  - Defeated Pedro Carrion (Cuba) PTS (26-20)
  - Lost to Ruslan Chagaev (Uzbekistan) RTD-2
- 2001 4th place at the Goodwill Games 2001 in Brisbane.
  - Lost to Alexander Povetkin (Russia) PTS (6-15) (Semifinals)
  - Lost to Pedro Carrion (Cuba) PTS (10-14) (Third place Bout)
- 2004 competed at the 2004 Olympics in Athens. Results were:
  - Defeated Aliaksandr Apanasionak (Belarus) PTS (23-5)
  - Lost to Roberto Cammarelle (Italy) PTS (21-23)

== Professional career ==
He turned professional in 2005. He lost to compatriot Taras Bidenko on points and was knocked out in the first round by amateur superstar Odlanier Solis.

== Professional boxing record ==
31 fights	14 wins	15 losses
By knockout	4	10
By decision	10	5
Draws	2	

No.	Result	Record	Opponent	Type	Round, time	Date	Location	Notes
31	Loss	14–15–2	Marcin Siwy	KO	4 (6), 1:18	25 May 2019	Hala widowiskowo-sportowa, Jelenia Góra, Poland	
30	Loss	14–14–2	Hussein Muhamed	TKO	4 (8), 1:12	2 Mar 2019	Maritim Hotel, Magdeburg, Germany	
29	Loss	14–13–2	Agron Smakici	KO	1 (8), 1:16	22 Dec 2017	Sporthalle, Hamburg, Germany	
28	Loss	14–12–2	Otto Wallin	KO	2 (8), 2:26	20 Jun 2015	Ballerup Super Arena, Ballerup, Denmark	
27	Loss	14–11–2	Franz Rill	PTS	8	12 Dec 2014	Eintracht Berlin Sportzentrum, Berlin, Germany	
26	Loss	14–10–2	Vladimir Tereshkin	UD	8	14 Dec 2013	Ice Palace, Brovary, Ukraine	
25	Loss	14–9–2	Mahmoud Charr	TKO	3 (12), 2:10	15 Jun 2013	Karl Eckel Halle, Hattersheim am Main, Germany	For WBC Mediterranean and Baltic heavyweight titles
24	Loss	14–8–2	Christian Hammer	RTD	6 (12), 3:00	22 Feb 2013	Strada Henri Coanda, Galați, Romania	For WBO European heavyweight title
23	Loss	14–7–2	Edmund Gerber	RTD	5 (8), 3:00	25 Feb 2012	Porsche-Arena, Stuttgart, Germany	
22	Win	14–6–2	Maximilian Rabe	KO	1 (4)	29 Oct 2011	McFit, Kreuzberg, Germany	
21	Loss	13–6–2	Ondřej Pála	RTD	7 (12), 3:00	1 Apr 2011	Digibet Pferdesportpark, Lichtenberg, Germany	For vacant WBO European heavyweight title
20	Loss	13–5–2	Juan Carlos Gómez	KO	3 (12), 2:44	27 Mar 2010	Alsterdorf Sporthalle, Alsterdorf, Germany	For vacant WBA International heavyweight title
19	Draw	13–4–2	Konstantin Airich	MD	8	23 Jan 2010	Kugelbake-Halle, Cuxhaven, Germany	
18	Loss	13–4–1	Andrzej Wawrzyk	UD	10	18 Dec 2009	MOSiR Hall, Łódź, Poland	For WBC Youth heavyweight title
17	Loss	13–3–1	Ondřej Pála	UD	8	24 Oct 2009	Kugelbake-Halle, Cuxhaven, Germany	
16	Win	13–2–1	Artur Marabyan	UD	12	31 Aug 2008	Yubileyny, Yugorsk, Russia	
15	Draw	12–2–1	Konstantin Airich	PTS	8	14 Mar 2008	Zenith - Die Kulturhalle, Munich, Germany	
14	Win	12–2	Engin Solmaz	TKO	5 (6)	17 Nov 2007	Sporthalle Neue Zeit, Schwedt, Germany	
13	Win	11–2	Andrey Kokoulin	UD	6	27 Sep 2007	Vodoley, Ekaterinburg, Russia	
12	Loss	10–2	Odlanier Solís	KO	1 (4), 0:43	16 Jun 2007	Atatürk Sport Salonu, Ankara, Turkey	
11	Win	10–1	Sedreck Fields	UD	8	27 Feb 2007	Sport Palace, Kyiv, Ukraine	
10	Loss	9–1	Taras Bidenko	MD	10	22 Aug 2006	Universum Gym, Wandsbek, Germany	For German International heavyweight title
9	Win	9–0	Suren Kalachyan	UD	6	29 Apr 2006	Hanns-Martin-Schleyer-Halle, Stuttgart, Germany	
8	Win	8–0	Antoine Palatis	UD	6	25 Mar 2006	TURM Erlebnis City, Oranienburg, Germany	
7	Win	7–0	Pavel Vanacek	KO	1 (6), 2:06	28 Feb 2006	Alte Reithalle, Stuttgart, Germany	
6	Win	6–0	Valery Chechenev	UD	6	15 Nov 2005	Hohenstaufenhalle, Göppingen, Germany	
5	Win	5–0	Aleksandrs Borhovs	UD	4	29 Oct 2005	TURM Erlebnis City, Oranienburg, Germany	
4	Win	4–0	Engin Solmaz	PTS	4	9 Jul 2005	Life Sportpark Herrenkrug, Magdeburg, Germany	
3	Win	3–0	David Blanco	UD	4	18 Jun 2005	Amphitheater Arena, Pula, Croatia	
2	Win	2–0	Garry Delaney	UD	4	10 May 2005	Pueblo Espanol, Mallorca, Spain	
1	Win	1–0	Roger Foe	KO	2 (4), 1:38	26 Mar 2005	Erdgas Arena, Riesa, Germany	
