= Petar Milas =

Croatian boxer

Personal information
- Born: 28 August 1995 (age 30) Split, Croatia
- Height: 1.94 m (6 ft 4 1/2 in)
- Weight: Heavyweight

Boxing career
- Stance: Orthodox

Boxing record
- Total fights: 22
- Wins: 21
- Win by KO: 17
- Losses: 1
Medal record
Men's amateur boxing
Representing Croatia
Croatian National Championships
Bronze medal – third place	2014 Split	Heavyweight

Petar Milas (born 28 August 1995) is a Croatian professional boxer.

== Professional career ==
Milas made his professional debut on 8 December 2015, scoring a first-round technical knockout (TKO) over Marin Zulum at the Joker Gym in Split, Croatia.

After compiling a record of 10–0 (8 KOs) he faced former world title challenger Kevin Johnson, for the IBO International heavyweight title on 10 March 2018 at the Maritim Berghotel in Braunlage, Germany. Milas became the second person to stop Johnson in 41 fights, capturing the IBO International title by eighth-round TKO after the referee called a halt to the contest on the advice of the ringside doctor due to a cut above Johnson's left eye. After retaining the title via unanimous decision (UD) against former world title challenger Francesco Pianeta in June, he defeated Mirko Tintor on 6 October at the TuS Halle in Traunreut, Germany, capturing the vacant WBC Mediterranean heavyweight title via fourth-round knockout (KO).

== Professional boxing record ==
22 fights	21 wins	1 loss
By knockout	17	1
By decision	4	0

No.	Result	Record	Opponent	Type	Round, time	Date	Location	Notes
22	Win	21–1	Joel Tambwe Djeko	KO	4 (8), 1:30	16 May 2026	Maritim Hotel, Ingolstadt, Germany	
21	Win	20–1	Granit Shala	KO	10 (10), 1:29	10 Jan 2026	Rudolf Weber-Arena, Oberhausen, Germany	Won IBF International heavyweight title
20	Win	19–1	Rydell Booker	TKO	5 (10), 1:54	18 Oct 2025	Wandsbeker Sporthalle, Hamburg, Germany	
19	Win	18–1	Eugen Buchmueller	KO	1 (8), 1:26	21 Jun 2025	Golds Gym Berlin, Germany	
18	Win	17–1	Jakub Sosinski	TKO	3 (6), 0:23	6 Jul 2024	Spaladium Arena, Split, Croatia	
17	Win	16–1	Pavel Sour	TKO	2 (8), 1:59	30 Sep 2022	CK Eventcenter, Bergkamen, Germany	
16	Loss	15–1	Tony Yoka	TKO	7 (10), 2:59	10 Sep 2021	Stade Roland Garros, Paris, France	
15	Win	15–0	Johnny Muller	UD	8	26 Oct 2019	Maritim Hotel, Berlin, Germany	
14	Win	14–0	Denis Bakhtov	TKO	6 (10), 1:51	6 Apr 2019	Ballhaus Forum, Unterschleißheim, Germany	
13	Win	13–0	Mirko Tintor	KO	4 (10), 1:29	6 Oct 2018	TuS Halle, Traunreut, Germany	Won vacant WBC Mediterranean heavyweight title
12	Win	12–0	Francesco Pianeta	UD	10	16 Jun 2018	Ballhaus Forum, Munich, Germany	Retained IBO International heavyweight title
11	Win	11–0	Kevin Johnson	TKO	8 (10), 0:45	10 Mar 2018	Maritim Berghotel, Braunlage, Germany	Won IBO International heavyweight title
10	Win	10–0	Andras Csomor	KO	1 (8), 1:41	16 Dec 2017	Messehalle, Straubing, Germany	
9	Win	9–0	Sinisa Kondic	TKO	1 (6), 1:08	17 Jun 2017	TuS Halle, Traunreut, Germany	
8	Win	8–0	Senad Omerovic	TKO	2 (4), 2:32	7 May 2017	Sport Hall "Radnicki", Banovići, Bosnia Herzegovina	
7	Win	7–0	Drazan Janjanin	UD	6	22 Apr 2017	TuS Halle, Traunreut, Germany	
6	Win	6–0	Andrej Pesic	TKO	3 (6), 2:09	4 Mar 2017	ASV Halle, Dachau, Germany	
5	Win	5–0	Bilal Ben Sidi	KO	2 (4), 0:35	17 Dec 2016	RTL Spiroudome, Charleroi, Belgium	
4	Win	4–0	Toni Bilic	PTS	4	19 Feb 2016	Joker Gym, Split, Croatia	
3	Win	3–0	Mislav Milardovic	TKO	1 (4)	12 Jan 2016	Joker Gym, Split, Croatia	
2	Win	2–0	Zvonimir Brajkovic	TKO	1 (4)	22 Dec 2015	Joker Gym, Split, Croatia	
1	Win	1–0	Marin Zulum	TKO	1 (4)	8 Dec 2015	Joker Gym, Split, Croatia	
