= Senad Gashi =

German boxer (born 1990)

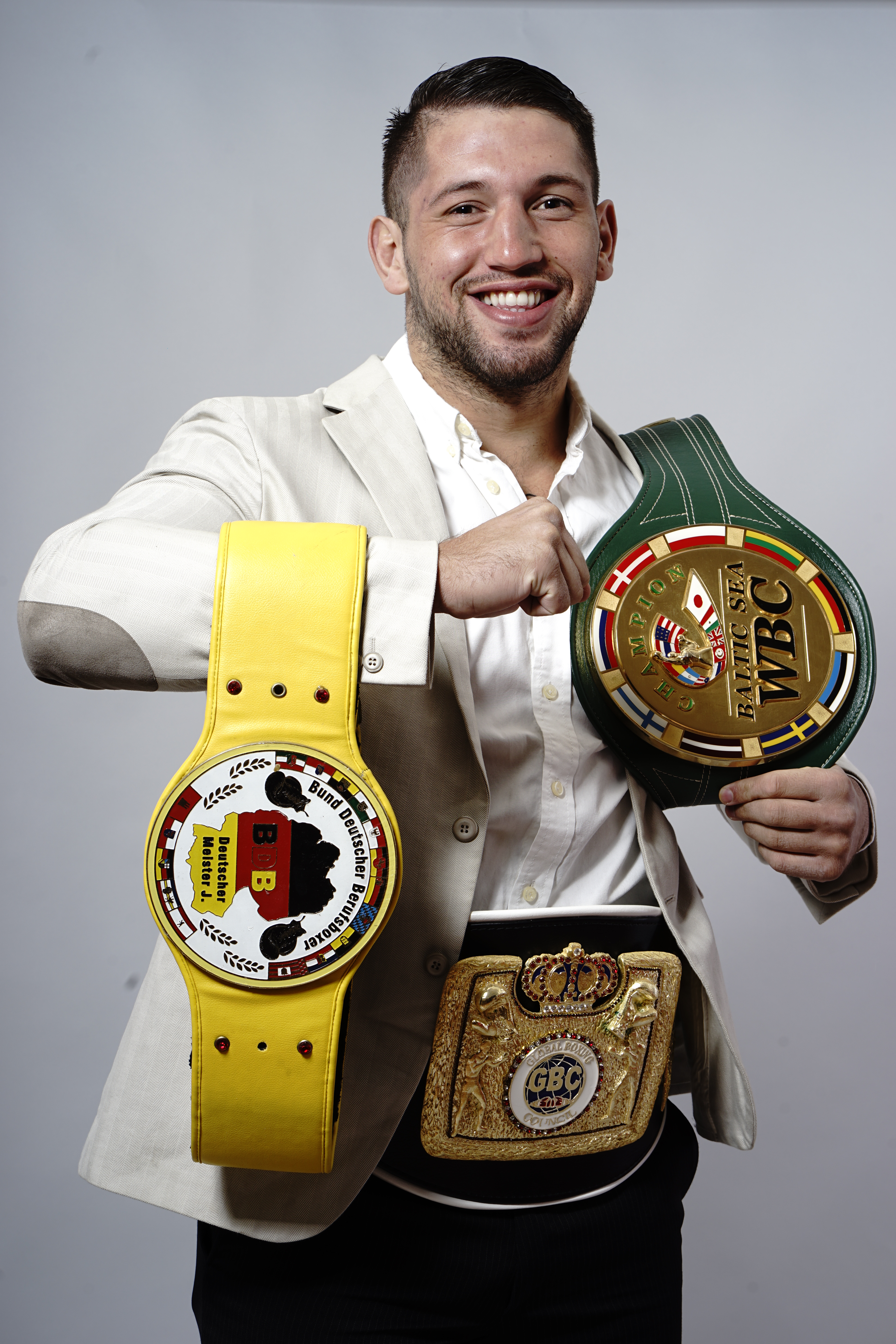

Personal information
- Nickname: Gachine Gun
- Nationality: German
- Born: 20 April 1990 (age 36) Peja, SFR Yugoslavia (now Kosovo)
- Height: 6 ft 0 1/2 in (184 cm)
- Weight: Bridgerweight; Heavyweight

Boxing career
- Stance: Southpaw

Boxing record
- Total fights: 42
- Wins: 36
- Win by KO: 34
- Losses: 5
- No contests: 1
Medal record
Men's amateur boxing
German U-21 Championships
Bronze medal – third place	2010 Eichstaett	Heavyweight

Senad Gashi

YouTube information
- Channel: RINGFLUENCER
- Years active: 2022-present
- Genre: vlog
- Subscribers: 125 thousand
- Views: 33.118 million
- Last updated: 24 July 2026

Senad Gashi (born 20 April 1990) is a German professional boxer and YouTuber. He has challenged once for the WBC interim bridgerweight title in 2023. At regional level, he has held multiple heavyweight championships, and challenged once for the German title in 2018.

== Professional career ==
=== Early career ===
Gashi made his professional debut on 17 May 2014 at the Saarlandhalle in Saarbrücken, beating Czech David Liska via first-round knockout (KO). On 29 November, Gashi defeated Aldin Avdic with a first-round TKO, in Frankfurt. In Gashi's seventh fight, he defeated Serbian Dubravko Knezevic via first-round knockout. On 20 June 2015, Gashi took his record to 8–0 with a second-round stoppage victory over Montenegrin heavyweight Ratko Draskovic and winning the GBC Intercontinental heavyweight title. On 2 October 2015, Gashi beat Hungarian Andras Csomor for the vacant German International and WBC Baltic Silver heavyweight titles with a fourth-round corner retirement (RTD).

On 21 May 2016, in his twelfth bout, Gashi defeated Marino Goles in a first-round TKO for the vacant GBU heavyweight title. On 2 July 2016 in Nuremberg, Gashi defeated Haris Calakovic by KO in the first round.

==== Gashi vs. Schwarz ====
On 21 April 2018, Gashi competed against the also unbeaten German Tom Schwarz, for Schwarz's WBO Inter-Continental and Germany heavyweight titles. In a highly controversial fight, Gashi had several head-butts that resulted in his disqualification in Round 6 of the fight. Until then, the fight was well balanced, with Schwarz being severely beaten several times by the smaller Gashi.

On 1 December 2018, in his first fight back following the loss to Schwarz, Gashi defeated Argentinian Ruben Angel Mino by a first-round knockout, for the vacant UBF International and GBU interim Continental heavyweight titles.

==== Gashi vs. Takam ====
On 22 December 2018, Gashi faced former world title challenger Carlos Takam at the O2 Arena in London with the bout taking place on the undercard of Dillian Whyte vs. Derek Chisora II on Sky Sports Box Office. Takam knocked Gashi down three times, eventually winning the fight via TKO in round seven.

==== Gashi vs. Chisora ====
On 20 April 2019, as the co-main event to David Allen vs. Lucas Browne, Gashi faced former world title challenger Derek Chisora. Gashi switched southpaw from the opening bell, landing an effective counter punch in the second but Chisora connected with a good body shot in the third and took control of the fight. Chisora continued to be the aggressor throughout and won by unanimous decision with scores of 99–91, 100–90, and 100–91.

On 27 July 2019, Gashi defeated Ervin Dzinic by a first-round TKO, for the vacant GBF world and UBF European heavyweight titles in Tetovo. On 6 October 2019, Gashi defeated Ozcan Cetinkaya by a second-round TKO, for the vacant WBF interim and GBU interim heavyweight titles in Ljubljana.

=== Bridgerweight ===
==== Gashi vs. Lerena ====
On 25 November 2023, Gashi faced former world title challenger Kevin Lerena for the vacant WBC interim bridgerweight title at the Emperors Palace in Kempton Park. He lost the fight by unanimous decision, with scores of 114–113, 118–109 and 117–110.

=== Return to heavyweight ===
==== Gashi vs. Schwarz II ====
On 3 May 2025, Gashi competed against Schwarz in a rematch, winning by unanimous decision with scores of 95–93, 99–89, and 96–92.

== Professional boxing record ==
42 fights	36 wins	5 losses
By knockout	34	1
By decision	2	3
By disqualification	0	1
No contests	1	

No.	Result	Record	Opponent	Type	Round, time	Date	Location	Notes
42	Win	36–5 (1)	Santiago Cortesia	TKO	3 (6), 1:30	29 Aug 2026	Rathaus Platz Lebach OpenAir, Lebach, Germany	
41	Win	35–5 (1)	Levani Lukhutashvili	TKO	1 (6), 2:28	25 Jul 2026	City Square, Gostivar, North Macedonia	
40	Loss	34–5 (1)	Peter Kadiru	UD	10	15 May 2026	SAP Arena, Mannheim, Germany	For vacant WBA Continental Europe heavyweight title
39	Win	34–4 (1)	Tom Schwarz	UD	10	3 May 2025	Millenium Event Halle, Braunschweig, Germany	
38	Win	33–4 (1)	Chinnakrit Junkot	TKO	1 (6), 1:50	15 Feb 2025	Apollo Boxing Camp, Phuket, Thailand	
37	Win	32–4 (1)	Surawut Wakuram	KO	1 (4), 1:17	23 Nov 2024	Singmanassak Muaythai School, Thani, Thailand	
36	Win	31–4 (1)	Alen Lauriolle	TKO	2 (6), 1:36	28 Sep 2024	Jo Deckarm Halle, Saarbrücken, Germany	
35	Win	30–4 (1)	Reinaldo Gonzalez	TKO	3 (12), 2:27	14 Sep 2024	Stadthalle, Bielefeld, Germany	Won vacant WBF bridgerweight title
34	Win	29–4 (1)	Mustapha Amadu	TKO	3 (8), 2:29	12 Jul 2024	Rozvadov, Czech Republic	
33	Win	28–4 (1)	Chinnakrit Junkot	TKO	1 (8), 2:05	8 Jun 2024	Singmanassak Muaythai School, Thani, Thailand	
32	Loss	27–4 (1)	Kevin Lerena	UD	12	25 Nov 2023	Emperors Palace, Kempton Park, South Africa	For vacant WBC interim bridgerweight title
31	Win	27–3 (1)	Alen Lauriolle	TKO	1 (6), 3:00	9 Sep 2023	Ostermann-Arena, Leverkusen, Germany	
30	Win	26–3 (1)	Ramazi Gogichashvili	KO	1 (6), 2:25	29 Jul 2023	City Square, Tetovo, North Macedonia	
29	Win	25–3 (1)	Hueseyin Akdemir	KO	1 (8), 0:33	3 Jun 2023	Universum Gym, Hamburg, Germany	
28	Win	24–3 (1)	Toni Thes	TKO	2 (6), 1:46	29 Oct 2022	Kleinblittersdorf, Germany	
27	Win	23–3 (1)	Davit Gogishvili	KO	1 (8), 1:12	30 Jul 2022	City Square, Tetovo, North Macedonia	
26	Win	22–3 (1)	Jairo Joaquin Diaz	UD	6	20 Nov 2021	Universum Gym, Hamburg, Germany	
25	NC	21–3 (1)	Hussein Muhamed	UD	10	19 Jun 2021	Universum Gym, Hamburg, Germany	Vacant WBC International Silver heavyweight title at stake; Originally a UD win for Muhamed, later ruled an NC after he failed a drug test
24	Win	21–3	Dominic Vial	TKO	3 (6), 0:46	24 Apr 2021	Universum Gym, Hamburg, Germany	
23	Win	20–3	Adnan Redzovic	TKO	4 (6), 1:47	12 Sep 2020	Universum Gym, Hamburg, Germany	
22	Win	19–3	Ozcan Cetinkaya	TKO	2 (12), 1:49	6 Oct 2019	Arena Stožice, Ljubljana, Slovenia	Won vacant WBF interim and GBU interim heavyweight titles
21	Win	18–3	Ervin Dzinic	TKO	1 (8), 1:28	27 Jul 2019	City Square, Tetovo, North Macedonia	Won vacant GBF world and UBF European heavyweight titles
20	Loss	17–3	Derek Chisora	UD	10	20 Apr 2019	The O2 Arena, London, England	
19	Loss	17–2	Carlos Takam	TKO	7 (10), 1:40	22 Dec 2018	The O2 Arena, London, England	
18	Win	17–1	Ruben Angel Mino	KO	1 (10), 1:00	1 Dec 2018	Altrheinhalle, Rastatt, Germany	Won vacant UBF International and GBU interim Continental heavyweight titles
17	Loss	16–1	Tom Schwarz	DQ	6 (12), 1:12	21 Apr 2018	Estrel Convention Center, Berlin, Germany	For WBO Inter-Continental and German heavyweight titles; Gashi disqualified for repeated head-butts
16	Win	16–0	Slobodan Jankovic	TKO	1 (6), 0:25	25 Feb 2018	Karoli Gaspar University Sporthall, Budapest, Hungary	
15	Win	15–0	Davit Gorgiladze	TKO	2 (6), 0:46	4 Mar 2017	Argensporthalle, Wangen im Allgaeu, Germany	
14	Win	14–0	Milos Dovedan	KO	1 (6), 1:07	10 Dec 2016	Saalbau Rhypark, Basel, Switzerland	
13	Win	13–0	Haris Calakovic	KO	1 (8), 1:33	2 Jul 2016	Loewensaal, Nuremberg, Germany	
12	Win	12–0	Marino Goles	TKO	1 (12), 1:35	21 May 2016	Oberpfalzhalle, Schwandorf, Germany	Won vacant GBU heavyweight title
11	Win	11–0	Andras Csomor	RTD	4 (10), 3:00	2 Oct 2015	Inselparkhalle, Hamburg, Germany	Won vacant WBC Baltic Silver and German International heavyweight titles
10	Win	10–0	Marko Angermann	TKO	2 (6), 2:37	28 Aug 2015	Pationoarul Dunarea, Galati, Romania	
9	Win	9–0	Elvir Behlulovic	KO	1 (4), 2:18	26 Jul 2015	Palestra Karagac, Peć, Bosnia and Herzegovina	
8	Win	8–0	Ratko Draskovic	TKO	2 (10), 1:05	20 Jun 2015	Universum Gym, Hamburg, Germany	Won vacant GBC Intercontinental heavyweight title
7	Win	7–0	Dubravko Knezevic	KO	1 (6), 1:36	16 May 2015	Alte Kantine, Salzwedel, Germany	
6	Win	6–0	Milos Dovedan	TKO	1 (4), 1:02	9 May 2015	Unihalle Wuppertal, Wuppertal, Germany	
5	Win	5–0	Aldin Avdic	TKO	1 (4), 1:26	29 Nov 2014	Frankfurt, Germany	
4	Win	4–0	Haris Radmilovic	KO	1 (4), 0:16	18 Oct 2014	Baubestriebshof, Homburg, Germany	
3	Win	3–0	Frantisek Kynkal	KO	1 (4), 0:55	11 Oct 2014	Saarlandhalle, Saarbrücken, Germany	
2	Win	2–0	Muhammed Ali Durmaz	TKO	2 (4), 0:46	25 Jul 2014	Congresshalle, Saarbrücken, Germany	
1	Win	1–0	David Liska	KO	1 (4), 0:55	17 May 2014	Saarlandhalle, Saarbrücken, Germany	

Sporting positions
Regional boxing titles
Vacant Title last held by Harry Duiven Jr	GBC Intercontinental heavyweight champion 20 June 2015 – December 2016; Vacated	Vacant Title next held by Djuar El Scheich
Vacant Title last held by Vyacheslav Glazkov	WBC Baltic Silver heavyweight champion 2 October 2015 – ? Vacated	Title discontinued
Vacant Title last held by Steffen Kretschmann	German International heavyweight champion 2 October 2015 – October 2016; Vacated	Vacant Title next held by Dennis Don Kiy
Vacant Title last held by Enobong Umohette	UBF International heavyweight champion 1 December 2018 – July 2021; Vacated	Vacant Title next held by Dominic Vial
New title	GBU Continental heavyweight champion Interim title 1 December 2018 – present	Incumbent
Vacant Title last held by Umut Camkiran	UBF European heavyweight champion 27 July 2019 – November 2020; Vacated	Vacant Title next held by Riza Baydilli
Minor world boxing titles
Vacant Title last held by Alexander Petkovic	GBU heavyweight champion 21 May 2016 – June 2018; Vacated	Vacant Title next held by Michael Wallisch
Vacant Title last held by Danny Williams	GBF heavyweight champion 27 July 2019 – present	Incumbent
New title	WBF heavyweight champion Interim title 6 October 2019 – present	Incumbent
Vacant Title last held by Erzen Rrustemi	GBU heavyweight champion Interim title 6 October 2019 – present	Incumbent
New title	WBF bridgerweight champion 14 September 2024 – present	Incumbent
