= Mariusz Wach =

Polish boxer (born 1979)

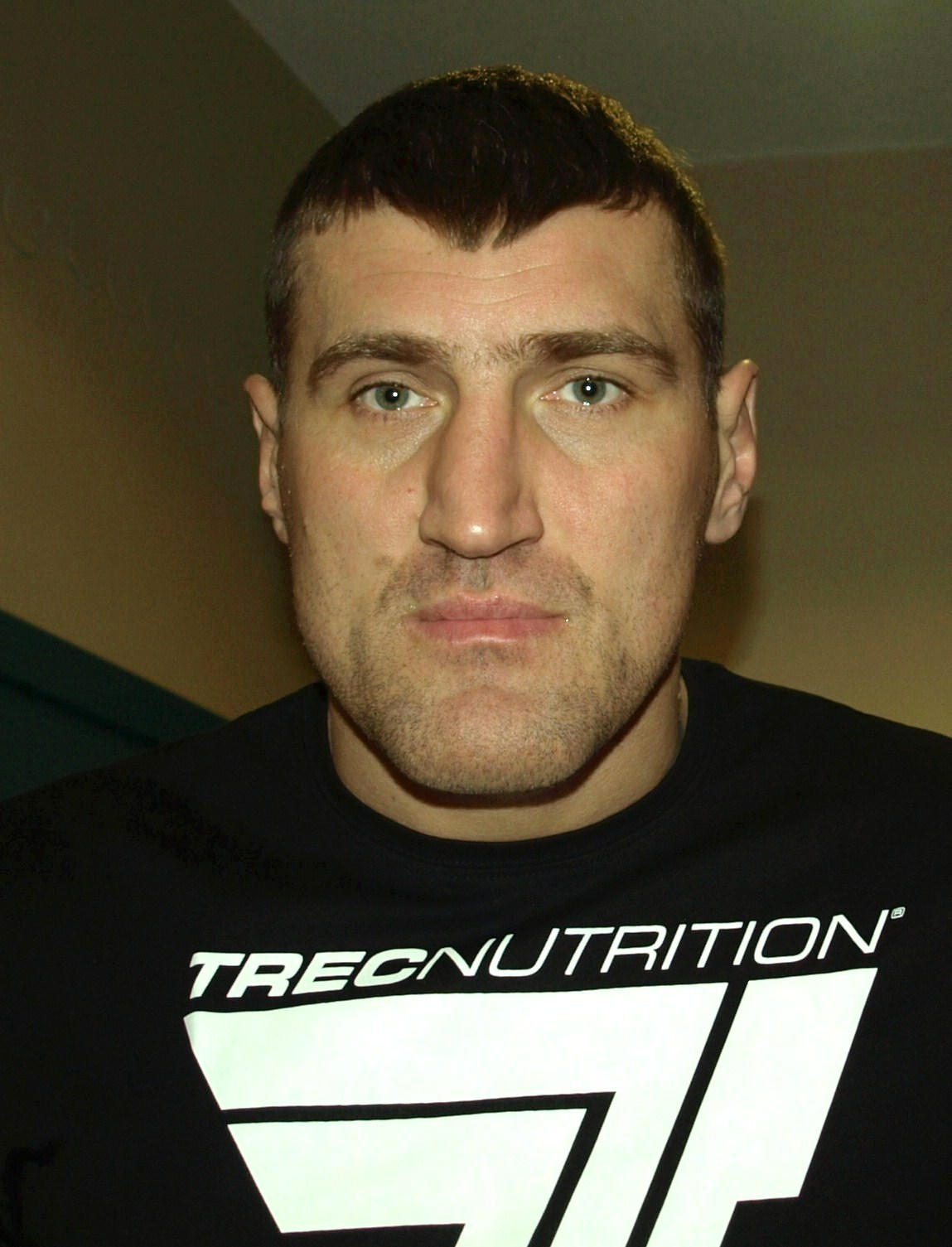
- Wach in 2014

Personal information
- Nickname: The Viking
- Born: 14 December 1979 (age 46) Kraków, Poland
- Height: 2.02 m (6 ft 7 1/2 in)
- Weight: Heavyweight

Boxing career
- Reach: 208 cm (82 in)
- Stance: Orthodox

Boxing record
- Total fights: 53
- Wins: 39
- Win by KO: 20
- Losses: 14
Medal record
EU Amateur Championships
Silver medal – second place	2004 Madrid	Super Heavyweight

Mariusz Wach (Polish pronunciation: [ˈmariuʂ ˈvax]; born 14 December 1979) is a Polish professional boxer. He challenged once for the unified WBA (Super), IBF, WBO, IBO, and the Ring magazine heavyweight titles in 2012.

== Early life ==
Wach was born 14 December 1979 in Kraków, Poland. He immigrated to North Bergen, New Jersey, as an adult.

== Amateur career ==
Wach first became acquainted with boxing in 1990, amassing a 90-fight amateur career that saw him represent his native Poland in numerous amateur tournaments. Among his greatest achievements during that period were winning two gold medals and a bronze in the Individual Polish Championships and a silver in the 2004 European Union Championships. Wach later represented Poland in the 2004 Summer Olympics as an alternate.

== Professional career ==
=== Early career ===
Wach turned pro in April 2005 and defeated Deniss Melniks by first-round knockout in Świebodzice, Poland. He made his American debut in January 2006 by defeating Adele Olakanye by decision on the undercard of Arturo Gatti's destruction of Thomas Damgaard at the Boardwalk Hall in Atlantic City, NJ. Wach won seven fights that year, including five in America which was highlighted by winning the Polish International heavyweight title by a ninth-round knockout of Arthur Cook in Illinois. A few months later he won a belt in TWBA federation. In April 2009 in Jaroslaw, Poland Wach blasted out his American opponent Julius Long and defended his title of the World Champion in TWBA. Mariusz has also served as a sparring partner for several well-known boxers, including former heavyweight champion Samuel Peter. In 2010, after being sidelined for a year due to injury, Wach returned to the ring in great shape and turned in one of his best performances as a professional, knocking out Christian Hammer in six rounds in Germany.

In September 2010, Wach was invited by Mariusz Kolodziej, CEO of Global Boxing Promotions, to move to the United States and train at Global Boxing Gym in North Bergen, NJ. Under the guidance of former heavyweight champion Michael Moorer, Wach began his 2-month training camp in preparation for his matchup with Jonathan Haggler. In his first fight of 2011 – against Haggler in Newark, NJ – Wach scored a third-round knockout to win the WBC Baltic heavyweight title. After this fight, Wach signed a promotional agreement with Mariusz Kolodziej of Global Boxing Promotions and Jimmy Burchfield of CES.

Wach's first big test came in July 2011, when he faced off with Kevin McBride, who ended Mike Tyson's career as a boxer. Wach was quicker and sharper, and with one right cross, knocked McBride out cold in the fourth round winning the WBC International heavyweight title.

Wach returned to the Mohegan Sun Arena just four months later with another statement-making performance, this time knocking out Jason Gavern in six rounds at the "November Reign" event.

On 24 March Wach showed that he is a force to be reckoned with after scoring a six-round TKO over another giant, Tye Fields (49–5, 44 KOs). The event took place at the Resorts Hotel & Casino in Atlantic City, New Jersey, and got coverage form ESPN's Friday Night Fights.

=== World title challenge ===
==== Wach vs. Klitschko ====
There was first mention of a potential showdown with unified world heavyweight champion Wladimir Klitschko in August 2011 when Klitschko's team approached Wach's promoters for a fight, however nothing materialized. Wach's promoter Global Boxing stated that it was Klitschko's advisor Shelly Finkel that contacted them. Bernd Boente denied these claims. In August 2012, serious negotiations took place for the fight. A date in November was considered with the venue likely to be in Hamburg, Germany. Terms were fully agreed within days of the negotiations for the fight to take place 10 November. Wach was the fourth Polish contender in history to try to win the world title in the heavyweight division. At 2.02 metres tall, with a reach of 2.08 metres and weighing 251 pounds, Wach was four centimetres taller than Klitschko with a reach two centimeters longer. In Poland, the fight was available via pay-per-view platform on Canal+ Sport for 39 zł and Polsat Sport for 40 zł.

On fight night, at the 02 World Arena, Mariusz Wach lost via one sided UD. The three judges' scored the fight 120–107, 120–107, and 119–109, all in favor of Klitschko. The bout opened with a battle between jabs which was won by Klitschko, who was following his jabs with his signature straight right. Wach managed to wobble Klitschko in round five but failed to take advantage. Wach also showed a great chin later in the fight when Klitschko began to let his hands go more landing thunderous shots. During the course of twelve rounds, Klitschko landed 274 of 693 punches landed (40%), whilst Wach landed 60 of his 308 thrown (19%). After the fight, there were allegations against Wach that he had used steroids.

=== Failed drug test ===
Wach failed a doping test after losing a world heavyweight title fight against Wladimir Klitschko. He admitted to doping in the bout against Klitschko and got sanctioned by the Federation of German Professional Boxing, but said that he plans to continue his career no matter how harsh the penalties are.

==== Wach vs. Whyte ====
On 7 December 2019, Wach fought title contender Dillian Whyte, who was ranked #1 by the WBC at heavyweight. Whyte was not at his best, but still managed to have control over most of the rounds, winning the bout via unanimous decision, 98–93, 97–93 and 97–93.

==== Wach vs. Johnson ====
In his next fight, Wach fought former world title challenger Kevin Johnson. In a fight held without fans in attendance because of COVID-19 restrictions, Wach managed to outpoint Johnson to a unanimous decision victory. The scorecards read 99–91, 98–92 and 97–93 in favor of the home fighter.

==== Wach vs. Fury ====
In his next fight, Wach fought former world title challenger Hughie Fury. Wach managed to induce a cut on Fury in the fourth round and tried to target the cut area for the rest of the fight. Fury, however, rebounded well from the cut and outboxed Wach for the rest of the fight, earning a unanimous decision victory.

==== Wach vs. Itauma ====
Wach challenged Moses Itauma for the WBO Intercontinental heavyweight title at The O2 Arena in London on 27 July 2024 but lost via second-round stoppage.

== Professional boxing record ==
53 fights	39 wins	14 losses
By knockout	20	6
By decision	19	8

No.	Result	Record	Opponent	Type	Round, time	Date	Location	Notes
53	Loss	39–14	Tyson Fury	RTD	7 (12), 3:00	24 Jul 2026	Max Muay Thai Stadium, Pattaya, Thailand	
52	Loss	39–13	Victor Vykhryst	UD	10	25 Mar 2026	Koltai Jeno Sports Hall, Budapest, Hungary	For WBO European heavyweight title
51	Win	39–12	Piotr Ćwik	PTS	6	27 Sep 2025	Centrum Kultury Śląskiej, Świętochłowice, Poland	
50	Loss	38–12	Kacper Meyna	UD	10	12 Apr 2025	Hala Stulecia, Sopot, Poland	For vacant WBC Baltic Sea and Republic of Poland heavyweight titles
49	Loss	38–11	Moses Itauma	TKO	2 (10), 2:30	27 Jul 2024	The O2 Arena, London, England	For WBO Inter-Continental heavyweight title
48	Win	38–10	Michal Boloz	UD	10	13 Oct 2023	Hala Sportowa, ul Nadbrzezna, Nowy Sacz, Poland	
47	Loss	37–10	Frazer Clarke	PTS	10	16 Jun 2023	York Hall, London, England	
46	Win	37–9	Jakub Sosinski	TKO	5 (8), 1:24	3 Jun 2023	Katy Wroclawskie, Poland	
45	Loss	36–9	Kevin Lerena	UD	10	17 Sep 2022	Emperors Palace, Kempton Park, South Africa	For vacant IBO Inter-Continental heavyweight title
44	Loss	36–8	Arslanbek Makhmudov	TKO	6 (10), 0:39	19 Feb 2022	Montreal Casino, Montreal, Canada	
43	Loss	36–7	Hughie Fury	UD	10	12 Dec 2020	The SSE Arena, London, England	
42	Win	36–6	Kevin Johnson	UD	10	12 Jun 2020	Palac w Konarach, Konary, Poland	Won vacant Republic of Poland International heavyweight title
41	Loss	35–6	Dillian Whyte	UD	10	7 Dec 2019	Diriyah Arena, Diriyah, Saudi Arabia	
40	Win	35–5	Giorgi Tamazashvili	KO	1 (6), 2:59	5 Oct 2019	Pieszyce, Poland	
39	Win	34–5	Gogita Gorgiladze	TKO	2 (8), 0:13	14 Sep 2019	Akademia Wychowania Fizycznego, Katowice, Poland	
38	Loss	33–5	Martin Bakole	TKO	8 (10), 2:26	6 Apr 2019	Spodek, Katowice, Poland	For vacant Republic of Poland International heavyweight title
37	Loss	33–4	Artur Szpilka	SD	10	10 Nov 2018	Gliwice Arena, Gliwice, Poland	
36	Loss	33–3	Jarrell Miller	TKO	9 (12), 1:02	11 Nov 2017	Nassau Coliseum, Uniondale, New York, US	
35	Win	33–2	Erkan Teper	UD	12	18 Mar 2017	Arena Leipzig, Leipzig, Germany	Won vacant IBF East/West Europe heavyweight title
34	Win	32–2	Marcelo Nascimento	UD	10	14 May 2016	Hala Azoty, Kędzierzyn-Koźle, Poland	
33	Loss	31–2	Alexander Povetkin	TKO	12 (12), 0:50	4 Nov 2015	Tatneft Arena, Kazan, Russia	For WBC Silver heavyweight title
32	Win	31–1	Konstantin Airich	TKO	6 (10), 2:39	19 Jun 2015	Sport Hall, Ostrowiec Świętokrzyski, Poland	
31	Win	30–1	Gbenga Oloukun	UD	10	14 Mar 2015	Sport Hall, Lubin, Poland	
30	Win	29–1	Travis Walker	KO	6 (10), 2:30	12 Dec 2014	MOSiR, Radom, Poland	
29	Win	28–1	Samir Kurtagic	UD	8	7 Oct 2014	Sport Hall, Dzierżoniów, Poland	
28	Loss	27–1	Wladimir Klitschko	UD	12	10 Nov 2012	02 World, Hamburg, Germany	For WBA (Super), IBF, WBO, IBO, and The Ring heavyweight titles
27	Win	27–0	Tye Fields	TKO	6 (12), 1:44	24 Mar 2012	Resorts Hotel & Casino, Atlantic City, New Jersey, US	Retained WBC International heavyweight title
26	Win	26–0	Jason Gavern	TKO	6 (12), 1:03	6 Nov 2011	Mohegan Sun Casino, Uncasville, Connecticut, US	Retained WBC International heavyweight title
25	Win	25–0	Kevin McBride	KO	4 (12), 2:25	29 Jul 2011	Mohegan Sun Casino, Uncasville, Connecticut, US	Won vacant WBC International heavyweight title
24	Win	24–0	Jonathan Haggler	KO	3 (10), 1:22	19 Feb 2011	Essex County College, Newark, New Jersey, US	Won vacant WBC Baltic heavyweight title
23	Win	23–0	Galen Brown	TKO	4 (6), 2:48	12 Nov 2010	Twin River Event Center, Lincoln, Rhode Island, US	
22	Win	22–0	Christian Hammer	KO	6 (8), 1:56	17 Jul 2010	Sport Center, Mecklenburg-Vorpommern, Germany	
21	Win	21–0	Julius Long	TKO	7 (10), 2:17	24 Apr 2009	Sport Hall, Jarosław, Poland	
20	Win	20–0	Remigijus Ziausys	UD	6	7 Feb 2009	Stadthalle, Mecklenburg-Vorpommern, Germany	
19	Win	19–0	Evgeny Orlov	PTS	10	21 Nov 2008	City Sport Hall, Grodzisk Mazowiecki, Poland	
18	Win	18–0	Daniil Peretyatko	UD	8	7 Aug 2008	Sport Hall, Świebodzice, Poland	
17	Win	17–0	Eric Boose	TKO	7 (8), 1:53	11 Jul 2008	Aragon Ballroom, Chicago, Illinois, US	
16	Win	16–0	Eduardo Franca	KO	1 (8), 2:57	13 Mar 2008	Sport Hall, Dzierżoniów, Poland	
15	Win	15–0	Yavor Marinchev	UD	4	15 Dec 2007	MOSiR Hall, Ożarów Mazowiecki, Poland	
14	Win	14–0	Andriy Kyndrych	UD	6	16 Nov 2007	Sport Hall, Tarnów, Poland	
13	Win	13–0	Zoltán Béres	TKO	4 (12), 1:58	16 Dec 2006	Sport Hall, Poznań, Poland	
12	Win	12–0	Alexandrs Borhovs	RTD	5 (6), 3:00	20 Oct 2006	Hall City, Włocławek, Poland	
11	Win	11–0	Arthur Cook	RTD	9 (10), 0:01	23 Jun 2006	Odeum Expo Center, Villa Park, Illinois, US	Won Republic of Poland International heavyweight title
10	Win	10–0	Raman Sukhaterin	UD	6	3 Jun 2006	City Hall, Ostrołęka, Poland	
9	Win	9–0	Oleg Belykov	TKO	2 (6), 1:34	6 Apr 2006	OSiR, Grodzisk Mazowiecki, Poland	
8	Win	8–0	Earl Ladson	UD	6	10 Mar 2006	Schuetzen Park, North Bergen, New Jersey, US	
7	Win	7–0	Adele Olakanye	UD	4	28 Jan 2006	Boardwalk Hall, Atlantic City, New Jersey, US	
6	Win	6–0	Oleksandr Subin	UD	6	17 Dec 2005	Sport Hall, Żyrardów, Poland	
5	Win	5–0	Tomáš Mrázek	UD	4	1 Dec 2005	Sport Hall, Ostrołęka, Poland	
4	Win	4–0	Sedrak Agagulyan	UD	4	27 Oct 2005	OSiR, Grodzisk Mazowiecki, Poland	
3	Win	3–0	Aleksandrs Borhovs	UD	4	1 Oct 2005	EWE-Arena, Niedersachsen, Germany	
2	Win	2–0	Milan Becak	TKO	2 (4), 1:14	5 Aug 2005	OSiR, Warsaw, Poland	
1	Win	1–0	Deniss Melniks	TKO	1 (4), 0:30	29 Apr 2005	OSiR, Świebodzice, Poland	

== Exhibition boxing record ==
3 fights	1 win	1 loss
By knockout	1	0
By decision	0	1
Draws	1	

No.	Result	Record	Opponent	Type	Round, time	Date	Location	Notes
3	Win	1–1–1	Kamil Bielecki	KO	1 (3), 2:30	10 Apr 2026	Hala Cracovia, Kraków, Poland	
2	Draw	0–1–1	Ryszard Raszkiewicz	UD	5	24 May 2025	Amfiteatr w Ustroniu, Ustroń, Poland	
1	Loss	0–1	Lukas Fajk	UD	3	27 Dec 2024	O2 Universum, Prague, Czechia	

== Kickboxing and K-1 record ==
Professional kickboxing record
1 Win (1 (T)KOs), 0 Loss, 1 Draw
Date	Result	Opponent	Event	Location	Method	Round	Time
2024-10-11	Draw	(Poland) Marcin Różalski	Strike King 3	Piotrków Trybunalski, Poland	Decision (Draw)	3	3:00
2024-01-13	Win	(Poland) Bartosz Słodkowski	Strike King 1	Wieliczka, Poland	KO (knee)	2	?

== Exhibition Mixed martial arts record ==
Professional record breakdown
1 match	0 wins	0 losses
Draws	1	

Res.	Record	Opponent	Method	Event	Date	Round	Time	Location	Notes
Draw	0–0–1	Salim Touahri	Draw (no finish)	Silesian MMA 20	February 1, 2025	3	2:00	Będzin, Poland	To win, either fighter needed a finish.

Sporting positions
Regional boxing titles
Vacant Title last held by Tomasz Bonin	Republic of Poland International heavyweight champion 23 June 2006; Vacated	Vacant Title next held by Andrzej Wawrzyk
New title	WBC Baltic heavyweight champion 19 February 2011 – November 2011; Vacated	Vacant Title next held by Andrzej Wawrzyk
Vacant Title last held by Bermane Stiverne	WBC International heavyweight champion 29 July 2011 – November 2012; Vacated	Vacant Title next held by Johnathon Banks
Vacant Title last held by Werner Kreiskott	IBF East/West Europe heavyweight champion 18 March 2017 – present	Incumbent
