= Konstantin Airich =

German boxer

Personal information
- Nationality: German
- Born: 4 November 1978 (age 48) Tselinograd, Kazakh SSR, Soviet Union
- Height: 1.85 m (6 ft 1 in)
- Weight: Heavyweight

Boxing career
- Stance: Orthodox

Boxing record
- Total fights: 43
- Wins: 23
- Win by KO: 18
- Losses: 18
- Draws: 2

Konstantin Airich (born 4 November 1978) is a German former professional boxer who competed from 2007 to 2016.

== Professional career ==
Airich's first defeat was against Danny Williams in a controversial fight. In the sixth round, Williams landed a number of big shots and was thought to be on the verge of knocking Airich out, when the bell sounded with 1:28 left on the clock. Williams ended the fight in the following round, when Airich's promoter decided to throw in the towel.

His second loss was a majority decision loss to Ondrej Pala on 6 March 2009.

Airich took part in the Prizefighter International Heavyweights tournament held at Alexandra Palace in London on 7 May 2011. After winning his opening bout of the evening against Lucian Bot, Airich was eliminated in the semifinal when he suffered a first-round knockout defeat to eventual runner up Tye Fields.

One month after that defeat, on 17 June 2011 he once again took part in the Bigger's Better VI boxing tournament and won the tournament by defeating every opponent he faced.

After Airich became the vacant IBF Inter-Continental heavyweight titleholder by knocking out German fighter Varol Vekiloglu in round 1. On 9 March 2012 he faced Ondrej Pala for the second time to defend his IBF Inter-Continental heavyweight title and for Pala's WBO European heavyweight title. This time Airich defeated Pala by TKO in round 9.

On 19 May 2012 he faced Odlanier Solis, who was coming back from a defeat and knee injury suffered during his last fight against WBC heavyweight champion Vitali Klitschko a year before. Airich lost the fight by unanimous decision.

On 13 September 2014, Airich faced British fighter, and London 2012 Olympic Gold Medalist, Anthony Joshua in an 8-round fight. During the third round, Joshua knocked Airich down and the referee stopped the fight. Airich was the first fighter to go past the second round with Anthony Joshua despite the loss.

== Professional boxing record ==
43 fights	23 wins	18 losses
By knockout	18	12
By decision	5	6
Draws	2	

No.	Result	Record	Opponent	Type	Round, time	Date	Location	Notes
43	Loss	23–18–2	Robert Helenius	KO	1 (8), 0:49	10 Sep 2016	Baltichallen, Mariehamn, Finland	
42	Loss	23–17–2	Krzysztof Zimnoch	TKO	4 (6), 2:36	28 May 2016	Arena Szczecin, Szczecin, Poland	
41	Loss	23–16–2	Sergey Kuzmin	TKO	2 (10), 2:17	8 Apr 2016	USC Soviet Wings, Moscow, Russia	For vacant WBA Asia heavyweight title
40	Win	23–15–2	Robert Filipovic	MD	8	26 Feb 2016	Stadthalle, Offenbach am Main, Germany	
39	Loss	22–15–2	Alexander Ustinov	KO	5 (10), 2:59	12 Dec 2015	VTB Arena, Moscow, Russia	
38	Loss	22–14–2	Andriy Rudenko	TKO	5 (10), 2:54	31 Oct 2015	Circus, Kryvyi Rih, Ukraine	
37	Win	22–13–2	Robert Filipovic	TKO	6 (8), 2:45	11 Oct 2015	Sport Halle, Herne, Germany	
36	Loss	21–13–2	Adrian Granat	TKO	3 (8)	28 Aug 2015	Pationoarul Dunarea, Galați, Romania	
35	Loss	21–12–2	Tom Schwarz	UD	8	11 Jul 2015	GETEC Arena, Magdeburg, Germany	
34	Loss	21–11–2	Mariusz Wach	TKO	6 (10), 2:39	19 Jun 2015	Sport Hall, Ostrowiec Świętokrzyski, Poland	
33	Loss	21–10–2	Anthony Joshua	TKO	3 (8), 1:16	13 Sep 2014	Phones 4u Arena, Manchester, England	
32	Loss	21–9–2	Denis Bakhtov	UD	8	26 Jul 2014	Ķipsala Exhibition Centre, Riga, Latvia	
31	Win	21–8–2	Marcel Gottschalk	TKO	6 (10), 2:00	30 May 2014	EnergieVerbund Arena, Dresden, Germany	
30	Win	20–8–2	Engin Solmaz	TKO	3 (4), 1:27	26 Apr 2014	Museum Zinkhuetter Ho, Aachen, Germany	
29	Loss	19–8–2	Christian Hammer	UD	10	11 Apr 2014	Universal Hall, Berlin, Germany	
28	Loss	19–7–2	Mahmoud Charr	KO	1 (12), 0:44	21 Dec 2012	Maritim Hotel, Cologne, Germany	For vacant WBC Mediterranean and Baltic heavyweight titles
27	Loss	19–6–2	Vyacheslav Glazkov	UD	10	8 Sep 2012	Olympic Stadium, Moscow, Russia	
26	Loss	19–5–2	Odlanier Solís	UD	12	19 May 2012	Events Center, Pharr, Texas, US	Lost IBF Inter-Continental heavyweight title
25	Win	19–4–2	Ondřej Pála	TKO	9 (12), 1:10	9 Mar 2012	Atatürk Spor Salonu, Tekirdağ, Turkey	Retained IBF Inter-Continental heavyweight title; Won WBO European heavyweight title
24	Win	18–4–2	Varol Vekiloglu	KO	1 (12), 1:05	14 Oct 2011	Mehrzweckhalle, Obertraubling, Germany	Won vacant IBF Inter-Continental heavyweight title
23	Loss	17–4–2	Tye Fields	KO	1 (3), 1:14	7 May 2011	Alexandra Palace, London, England	Prizefighter 18: The International Heavyweights - semi-final
22	Win	17–3–2	Lucian Bot	UD	3	7 May 2011	Alexandra Palace, London, England	Prizefighter 18: The International Heavyweights - quarter-final
21	Loss	16–3–2	Gbenga Oloukun	TKO	4 (10), 0:47	12 Nov 2010	HanseDom, Stralsund, Germany	
20	Win	16–2–2	Serdar Uysal	TKO	1 (6)	11 Sep 2010	Bitterfeld, Germany	
19	Win	15–2–2	Alexander Kahl	TKO	2 (8), 1:55	4 Jun 2010	Karl-Eckel-Weg Halle, Hattersheim am Main, Germany	
18	Win	14–2–2	Alexey Varakin	TKO	1 (8), 1:36	9 Apr 2010	Sport- und Kongresshalle, Schwerin, Germany	
17	Draw	13–2–2	Oleksiy Mazikin	MD	8	23 Jan 2010	Kugelbake-Halle, Cuxhaven, Germany	
16	Win	13–2–1	Cisse Salif	UD	8	24 Oct 2009	Kugelbake-Halle, Cuxhaven, Germany	
15	Win	12–2–1	Yuri Lunev	KO	1 (8), 1:12	18 Sep 2009	Gran Casino, Castellón de la Plana, Spain	
14	Loss	11–2–1	Ondřej Pála	MD	10	6 Mar 2009	Kugelbake-Halle, Cuxhaven, Germany	
13	Win	11–1–1	Furkat Tursunov	UD	8	18 Nov 2008	Kugelbake-Halle, Cuxhaven, Germany	
12	Win	10–1–1	Vaclav Cihlar	KO	1 (6)	27 Sep 2008	Genesis, Wusterhusen, Germany	
11	Loss	9–1–1	Danny Williams	TKO	7 (8)	30 May 2008	Pabellon Lasesarre, Barakaldo, Spain	
10	Win	9–0–1	Andriy Oliynyk	UD	8	26 Apr 2008	Spor Salonu, Trabzon, Turkey	
9	Draw	8–0–1	Oleksiy Mazikin	PTS	8	14 Mar 2008	Zenith, Munich, Germany	
8	Win	8–0	Turhan Altunkaya	RTD	2 (10), 3:00	23 Dec 2007	Maritim Hotel, Halle, Germany	Won vacant Germany interim heavyweight title
7	Win	7–0	Raymond Ochieng	KO	2 (8)	21 Sep 2007	Hansehalle, Lübeck, Germany	
6	Win	6–0	Engin Solmaz	TKO	3 (6), 1:23	6 Jul 2007	Arena Gym, Hamburg, Germany	
5	Win	5–0	Adnan Serin	KO	5 (6)	16 Jun 2007	Atatürk Sport Hall, Ankara, Turkey	
4	Win	4–0	Engin Solmaz	TKO	5 (6)	27 Apr 2007	Arena Gym, Hamburg, Germany	
3	Win	3–0	Valeri Meierson	TKO	2 (4)	9 Mar 2007	Arena Gym, Hamburg, Germany	
2	Win	2–0	Tomas Mrazek	TKO	2 (4)	10 Feb 2007	Grand Elysée Hotel, Hamburg, Germany	
1	Win	1–0	Mihaly Farkas	TKO	1 (4)	25 Jan 2007	PalaLido, Milan, Italy	
