= Francesco Pianeta =

Italian boxer

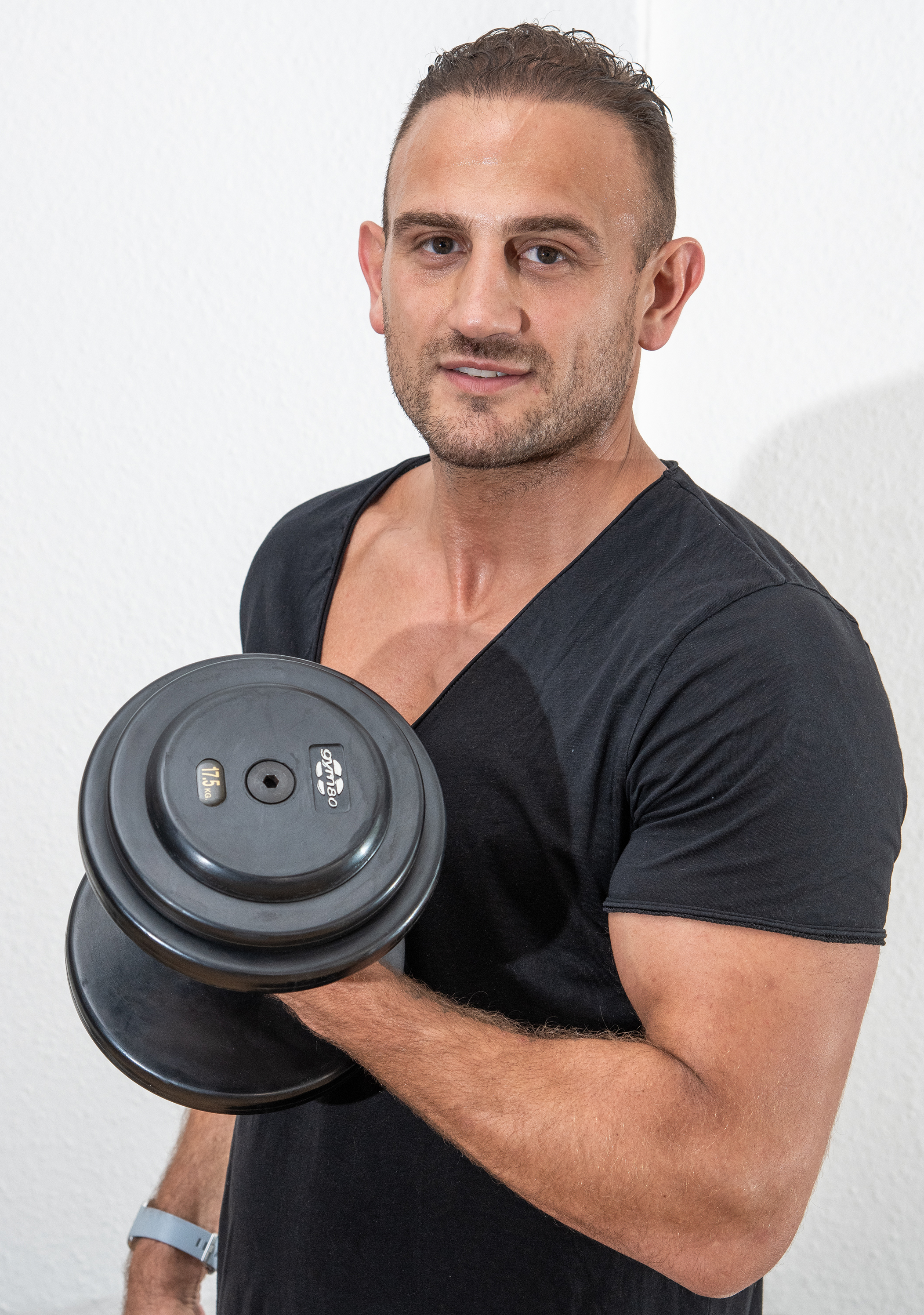

Personal information
- Nickname: Italian Ace
- Nationality: Italian
- Born: 8 October 1984 (age 41) Corigliano Calabro, Italy
- Height: 1.96 m (6 ft 5 in)
- Weight: Heavyweight

Boxing career
- Reach: 203 cm (80 in)
- Stance: Southpaw

Boxing record
- Total fights: 41
- Wins: 35
- Win by KO: 21
- Losses: 5
- Draws: 1

Francesco Pianeta (born 8 October 1984) is an Italian former professional boxer who competed from 2005 to 2018. He challenged once for the unified WBA (Super), IBF, WBO, IBO, The Ring magazine heavyweight titles in 2013; and once for the WBA (Regular) heavyweight title in 2015. He holds a notable win over former world heavyweight champion Oliver McCall.

== Background ==
Pianeta was born in Corigliano in the province of Cosenza. When he was six his family emigrated to Germany and his father went to work in a butcher store.

Before he turned to professional boxing Pianeta practiced Muay Thai and had a record of 9 wins and one loss.

Despite being a long-time Germany resident, Pianeta has held close ties with Italy and in 2008 he stated that his ambition was to win the Italian heavyweight title.

== Professional career ==
Pianeta's first fight as a professional boxer was in July 2005, in Hessen, Germany, when he beat Slovak journeyman Sylvester Petrovič with a second round knockout.

Pianeta was subsequently undefeated in all of his next 27 fights, with 14 wins by KO and 1 draw.

On 4 May 2013, Pianeta fought Wladimir Klitschko for WBA (Super), IBF, WBO, IBO, lineal & The Ring heavyweight titles. He was knocked down 3 times by Klitschko and lost the bout by the way of TKO.

Up until 2018, Pianeta was trained by Alexander Petkovic and promoted by Petkovic's Petko's LMS Promotion. Based in Germany, he has also fought in Italy, Ireland, Austria, Poland and Belgium.

Pianeta's final fight was against former unified and lineal heavyweight champion Tyson Fury at Windsor Park on 18 August 2018. Fury dominated the fight in convincing fashion, winning every single round on referee Steve Gray's scorecard in a shutout points decision victory, handing Pianeta his fifth career loss.

In February 2019, Pianeta announced his retirement. He is now a boxing trainer.

== Professional boxing record ==
41 fights	35 wins	5 losses
By knockout	21	3
By decision	14	2
Draws	1	

No.	Result	Record	Opponent	Type	Round, time	Date	Location	Notes
41	Loss	35–5–1	Tyson Fury	PTS	10	18 Aug 2018	Windsor Park, Belfast, Northern Ireland	
40	Loss	35–4–1	Petar Milas	UD	10	16 Jun 2018	Maritim Berghotel, Braunlage, Germany	For IBO International heavyweight title
39	Win	35–3–1	Dašo Simeunović	TKO	3 (6), 1:39	10 Mar 2018	Maritim Berghotel, Braunlage, Germany	
38	Loss	34–3–1	Kevin Johnson	TKO	7 (10), 2:48	14 Oct 2017	Ballhausforum, Unterschleißheim, Germany	Lost IBO International heavyweight title
37	Win	34–2–1	Oezcan Cetinkaya	TKO	2 (10), 1:11	8 Jul 2017	Amphitheater, Gelsenkirchen, Germany	Won vacant IBO International heavyweight title
36	Win	33–2–1	Edi Delibaltaoglu	TKO	3 (6), 0:33	17 Jun 2017	TuS Halle, Traunreut, Germany	
35	Win	32–2–1	Hasan Olaki	TKO	5 (6)	20 Feb 2016	König Pilsener Arena, Oberhausen, Germany	
34	Loss	31–2–1	Ruslan Chagaev	KO	1 (12), 2:57	12 Jul 2015	GETEC Arena, Magdeburg, Germany	For WBA (Regular) heavyweight title
33	Win	31–1–1	Ivica Bačurin	UD	12	6 Dec 2014	Sporthall Budakalász, Budakalász, Hungary	Retained WBO European heavyweight title
32	Win	30–1–1	Mickael Vieira	KO	1 (12), 2:20	30 May 2014	EnergieVerbund Arena, Dresden, Germany	Won vacant WBO European heavyweight title
31	Win	29–1–1	Robert Teuber	TKO	2 (10), 1:43	6 Dec 2013	Brandenburg Halle, Frankfurt, Germany	Won vacant German International heavyweight title
30	Loss	28–1–1	Wladimir Klitschko	TKO	6 (12), 2:52	4 May 2013	SAP Arena, Mannheim, Germany	For WBA (Super), IBF, WBO, IBO, and The Ring heavyweight titles
29	Win	28–0–1	Nelson Dario Dominguez	TKO	1 (10), 2:31	16 Nov 2012	Maritim Hotel, Magdeburg, Germany	
28	Win	27–0–1	Frans Botha	UD	10	7 Sep 2012	RWE Rhein-Ruhr Sporthalle, Mülheim, Germany	
27	Win	26–0–1	Oliver McCall	UD	10	16 May 2012	Brandenburg Halle, Frankfurt, Germany	
26	Win	25–0–1	Zack Page	PTS	8	7 Jan 2012	Maritim Hotel, Magdeburg, Germany	
25	Win	24–0–1	Robert Hawkins	PTS	8	21 Oct 2011	Brandenburg Halle, Frankfurt, Germany	
24	Win	23–0–1	Ivica Perković	TKO	3 (8), 1:23	2 Apr 2011	Herning Kongrescenter, Herning, Denmark	
23	Win	22–0–1	Samir Kurtagić	UD	8	12 Feb 2011	RWE Rhein-Ruhr Sporthalle, Mülheim, Germany	
22	Win	21–0–1	Mike Middleton	KO	1 (8), 1:10	18 Dec 2010	Max-Schmeling-Halle, Berlin, Germany	
21	Win	20–0–1	Evgeny Orlov	UD	8	5 Dec 2009	Arena Ludwigsburg, Ludwigsburg, Germany	
20	Win	19–0–1	Matt Skelton	RTD	8 (12), 3:00	19 Sep 2009	Jahnsportforum, Neubrandenburg, Germany	Retained European Union heavyweight title
19	Draw	18–0–1	Albert Sosnowski	PTS	12	4 Apr 2009	Burg-Waechter Castello, Düsseldorf, Germany	Retained European Union heavyweight title
18	Win	18–0	Johann Duhaupas	UD	12	20 Dec 2008	Hallenstadion, Zürich, Switzerland	Retained European Union heavyweight title
17	Win	17–0	Scott Gammer	RTD	8 (12),	30 Aug 2008	Max-Schmeling-Halle, Berlin, Germany	Won vacant European Union heavyweight title
16	Win	16–0	Michael Marrone	TKO	2 (10), 1:23	17 May 2008	Oberfrankenhalle, Bayreuth, Germany	Retained WBC Youth heavyweight title
15	Win	15–0	Donnell Wiggins	KO	3 (10), 2:04	16 Feb 2008	Nuremberg Arena, Nuremberg, Germany	Won vacant WBC Youth heavyweight title
14	Win	14–0	Paolo Ferrara	UD	8	29 Dec 2007	Seidensticker Halle, Bielefeld, Germany	
13	Win	13–0	Leo Sanchez	TKO	2 (8)	24 Nov 2007	Stadthalle, Steyr, Austria	
12	Win	12–0	Colin Wilson	UD	8	29 Sep 2007	EWE Arena, Oldenburg, Germany	
11	Win	11–0	Miyan Solomons	UD	8	23 Jun 2007	Stadthalle, Zwickau, Germany	
10	Win	10–0	Paolo Ferrara	SD	8	14 Apr 2007	Porsche-Arena, Stuttgart, Germany	
9	Win	9–0	Aleksandrs Borhovs	PTS	8	25 Mar 2007	Point Theatre, Dublin, Ireland	
8	Win	8–0	Georgi Harizanov	KO	2 (6)	17 Feb 2007	Sportcomplex van Evere, Evere, Belgium	
7	Win	7–0	Cerrone Fox	TKO	3 (8)	20 Jan 2007	St. Jakobshalle, Basel, Switzerland	
6	Win	6–0	Valentin Marinel	TKO	1 (6), 2:47	25 Nov 2006	Torwar Hall, Warsaw, Poland	
5	Win	5–0	Vlado Szabo	UD	6	11 Aug 2006	Toscolano Maderno, Lombardia, Italy	
4	Win	4–0	Dirk Mandelartz	KO	1 (6)	20 May 2006	Piazza di Siena, Rome, Italy	
3	Win	3–0	Ervin Slonka	TKO	2 (4)	29 Apr 2006	University Hall, Berlin, Germany	
2	Win	2–0	Tomáš Mrázek	TKO	2 (4)	11 Mar 2006	Mehrzweckhalle, Greifswald, Germany	
1	Win	1–0	Sylvester Petrovič	KO	2 (4), 2:53	2 Jul 2005	Karl Eckel Halle, Hattersheim am Main, Germany	
