= Kubrat Pulev vs. Derek Chisora =

2016 Boxing match

Battle of the Giants
- Date: 7 May 2016
- Venue: Barclaycard Arena, Hamburg, Germany
- Title(s) on the line: vacant European heavyweight title

Tale of the tape
Boxer	Kubrat Pulev	Derek Chisora
Nickname	The Cobra	Del Boy
Hometown	Sofia, Bulgaria	Finchley, London, UK
Pre-fight record	22–1 (12 KOs)	25–5 (17 KOs)
Age	35 years	32 years, 4 months
Height	6 ft 4 1/2 in (194 cm)	6 ft 2 in (188 cm)
Weight	249 lb (113 kg)	241 3/4 lb (110 kg)
Style	Orthodox	Orthodox
Recognition	IBF; No. 5 Ranked Heavyweight; WBA; No. 14 Ranked Heavyweight	IBF; No. 6 Ranked Heavyweight; WBO; No. 10 Ranked Heavyweight

Result
- Pulev wins via 12–round split decision (116–112, 113–115, 118–110)

Kubrat Pulev vs. Derek Chisora, billed as Battle of the Giants, was a professional boxing match contested between Kubrat Pulev, and Derek Chisora, with the vacant European heavyweight title on the line. The fight was an IBF "eliminator", with the winner becoming the number two contender for the IBF heavyweight title, held at the time by Anthony Joshua. The bout took place on 7 May 2016 at the Barclaycard Arena, with Pulev winning by split decision.

== Background ==
In July 2013, Pulev was ordered to defend his European championship against Chisora, in the aftermath of the latter's knockout victory over Malik Scott. However, Pulev would instead schedule an IBF final eliminator against Tony Thompson in August. Despite the EBU ordering and subsequently, postponing a purse bid for the contest, Pulev would ultimately relinquish the title, with Chisora facing Edmund Gerber for the vacant belt in September. The following month, the EBU announced Pulev as the mandatory challenger for Chisora. Pulev publicly addressed the match, stating, "It's not a problem. I am ready to take on everyone. I'll prepare well and beat him too." Once again, a purse bid was called, yet the match did not materialise.

Pulev regained composure following a loss against Wladimir Klitschko in November 2014, extending his contract with Sauerland Event, linking up with new trainer Ulli Wegner, and scoring back-to-back victories over George Arias and Maurice Harris in 2015. Pulev and Chisora both appeared on the same card for the latter bout, respectively, as stablemates. Chisora also regained composure following a loss against Tyson Fury in November 2014, signing a contract with Sauerland Event, linking up with new trainer Gary Innes, and going on a 5-fight winning streak in 6 months.

In December 2015, reigning champion Robert Helenius was ordered to defend his European championship against Chisora, opting to relinquish the title, positioning Chisora to challenge for the vacant belt. Following failed negotiations with Anthony Joshua, it was announced by the EBU that Pulev and Chisora would face each other, with Sauerland stating, "It could have gone to a purse bid but I guess Eddie and Anthony chose to go a different avenue because we couldn't reach an agreement. They chose to move on and at the end of the day, Dereck has his demands. Anthony gave up the position and Pulev moves in." On 15 March 2016, it was announced that the fight would take place at the Barclaycard Arena in Hamburg on 7 May 2016.

Chisora was criticised for his behaviour at the press conference after grabbing Pulev when the two went head-to-head during the staredown. More controversy at the weigh-in before the fight when Chisora was hit by a bottle.

== Fight details ==
From the opening bell, the bout was marred with clinches, most initiated by Pulev. Chisora was warned repeatedly by referee Manuel Oliver Palomo in the first round. As the early rounds progressed, Pulev sought to establish range and rhythm from the outside, probing behind his jabs, while Chisora pressed forward, looking to close distance with aggressive intent. Early exchanges saw Pulev land accurate straight shots, including solid one-two combinations that briefly halted Chisora’s momentum. However, Chisora responded with hooks to the body and overhand rights to the head. In the middle rounds, Chisora complained several times to the referee for Pulev pulling down the back of his head, leading to further warnings. Pulev found continued success at mid-range, peppering Chisora with a series of controlled combinations, punctuated by uppercuts during close-quarter exchanges. Chisora maintained pressure during the clinches, throwing with volume and investing in body shots. In round six, Chisora landed a flush right hand on Pulev, whose left eye was cut. Pulev responded, leading with the jab, landing a powerful left hook. In the later rounds, fatigue set in. In round nine, Chisora landed a clean left hook on Pulev, which seemed to hurt him momentarily. Pulev responded with a straight right hand and one-two combinations. Later in the round, as Pulev initiated further clinches, Chisora applied pressure, landing right hands on Pulev and backing him against the ropes. As both fighters traded punches in the closing seconds. The championship rounds saw Pulev landing accurate jabs and straight right hands, as Chisora, whose right eye began to swell, responded with hooks to the body on the inside. Pulev won by a controversial split decision with scores of 116–112, 118–110 in his favour, and 115–113 in favour of Chisora. Compubox showed that Pulev landed 155 of his 511 punches thrown (30%) and Chisora landed 93 of his 335 thrown (28%). Chisora did have the edge on power punches, landing 60 compared to 55 from Pulev.

== Aftermath ==
Following the win, Pulev relinquished his European championship instead of facing the EBU's mandatory challenger, Mariusz Wach. Later in the month, Joseph Parker defeated Carlos Takam, becoming the number one contender for the IBF heavyweight title. However, Parker subsequently faced Andy Ruiz later in the year, securing the vacant WBO heavyweight title, which positioned Pulev as the highest-ranked available contender for the IBF championship. After participating in interim bouts against Samuel Peter and Kevin Johnson, and the retirement of Klitschko, Pulev received a second opportunity to contend for the world championship, and was scheduled to face Joshua in October 2017. However, he was forced to withdraw due to injury and was replaced by Takam.

After the defeat, Chisora's loss cast doubt on his prospects for a world title shot against IBF champion Joshua. Chisora, however, regained composure and secured a second-round knockout victory over Drazan Janjanin in September, thereby paving the way for a grudge match against Dillian Whyte in December.

On 7 June 2022, it was announced that Pulev and Chisora would square off in a rematch on 9 July, at The O2 Arena in London, England. Chisora defeated Pulev by split decision.

== Fight card ==
Confirmed bouts:

Weight Class		vs.		Method	Round	Time	Notes
Heavyweight	Kubrat Pulev	def.	Derek Chisora	SD	12		^{Note 1}
Cruiserweight	Norair Mikaeljan (c)	def.	Cristian Javier Medina	UD	10		^{Note 2}
Super-middleweight	Ismael Oezen	def.	Ramazi Gogichashvili	KO	3/10	1:56	^{Note 3}
Light-welterweight	Anthony Yigit	def.	Phil Sutcliffe Jnr	MD	8/8
Cruiserweight	Artur Mann	def.	Valery Brudov	UD	8/8
Super-middleweight	Vincent Feigenbutz	def.	Crispulo Javier Andino	TKO	3/8	1:28
Super-middleweight	Stefan Härtel	def.	Ruslan Shchelev	UD	8/8
Light-middleweight	Sebastian Formella	def.	Gyula Vajda	TKO	4/6	2:15
Middleweight	Patrick Wojcicki	def.	Robizoni Omsarashvili	KO	2/4	1:09
Middleweight	Dominik Ameri	def.	Mihaita Cosma	KO	2/4	1:25
Welterweight	Rishard Kwasniak	def.	Eduard Martirosov	KO	1/4	0:38	^{Note 4}

^Note 1 For vacant European heavyweight title
^Note 2 For WBO International cruiserweight title
^Note 3 For vacant GBU Inter-Continental super-middleweight title
^Note 4 Kwasniak's professional debut

== Broadcasting ==
Country	Broadcasters	
Country	Free-to-air	Cable/Pay TV
Germany (host)	Sat.1	—N/a
United Kingdom	—N/a	Sky Sports
Argentina	—N/a	TyC Sports
United States	—N/a	AWE

Preceded by vs. Maurice Harris	Kubrat Pulev's bouts 7 May 2016	Succeeded by vs. Samuel Peter
Preceded by vs. Andras Csomor	Derek Chisora's bouts 7 May 2016	Succeeded by vs. Drazan Janjanin
