= Tyson Fury vs. Derek Chisora III =

Boxing competition

- Date: 3 December 2022
- Venue: Tottenham Hotspur Stadium, London, England
- Titles on the line: WBC heavyweight title

Tale of the tape
Boxer	Tyson Fury	Derek Chisora
Nickname	The Gypsy King	War
Hometown	Manchester, England	London, England
Pre-fight record	32–0–1 (23 KOs)	33–12 (23 KOs)
Age	34 years, 3 months	38 years, 11 months
Height	6 ft 9 in (206 cm)	6 ft 2 in (188 cm)
Weight	268 3/4 lb (122 kg)	260 3/4 lb (118 kg)
Style	Orthodox	Orthodox
Recognition	WBC; Heavyweight Champion	WBC; No. 13 Ranked Heavyweight; WBA International heavyweight champion

Result
- Fury wins via 10th-round technical knockout

Tyson Fury vs. Derek Chisora III was a professional boxing match contested between WBC heavyweight champion, Tyson Fury, and WBA International heavyweight champion, Derek Chisora, that took place on 3 December 2022 at the Tottenham Hotspur Stadium, with Fury winning by technical knockout in the tenth round.

== Background ==
Fury and Chisora first fought in 2011, with Chisora defending his British and Commonwealth titles at Wembley Arena, both men went into the fight with a record of 14–0. Fury won by unanimous decision with scores of 117–112, 117–112, and 118–111. Fury and Chisora fought for a second time in 2014, with Chisora defending his European and WBO International titles at the ExCel, with Fury winning by corner retirement in the tenth round.

On 20 October 2022, it was announced that Fury and Chisora would fight in a trilogy bout on 3 December at the Tottenham Hotspur Stadium in London, live on BT Sport Box Office.

== Fight details ==
Most commentators concluded that Fury was dominant throughout the fight. The referee stopped the fight in the tenth round after concluding that Chisora was unable to defend himself effectively. This led to Fury's victory via a TKO. Chisora also received praise for being "tough" and for standing up to Fury. Compubox showed that Fury landed 205 of his 481 punches thrown (43%) and Chisora landed 87 of his 276 thrown (32%).

== Aftermath ==
Following Fury's win, in the post-fight interview, Fury challenged unified heavyweight champion Oleksandr Usyk who was in attendance at ringside to an undisputed title fight next in 2023. Fury also stated that if a fight against Usyk did not materialise, then he would defend his world title against WBO interim heavyweight champion Joe Joyce.

== Fight card ==
Weight Class		vs.		Method	Round	Time	Notes
Heavyweight	Tyson Fury (c)	def.	Derek Chisora	TKO	10/12	2:51	^{Note 1}
Heavyweight	Daniel Dubois (c)	def.	Kevin Lerena	TKO	3/12	3:00	^{Note 2}
Lightweight	Denys Berinchyk (c)	def.	Yvan Mendy (c)	UD	12		^{Note 3}
Light-heavyweight	Karol Itauma	def.	Vladimir Belujsky	TKO	1/8	1:18
Cruiserweight	Hosea Burton	def.	Darryl Sharp	PTS	6
Super-featherweight	Isaac Lowe	def.	Sandeep Singh Bhatti	PTS	6
Lightweight	Royston Barney-Smith	def.	Cruz Perez	TKO	1/4	1:02

^Note 1 For WBC heavyweight title
^Note 2 For WBA (Regular) heavyweight title
^Note 3 For European and WBO International lightweight titles

== Broadcasting ==
Country	Broadcaster	
Country	PPV	Stream
United Kingdom	BT Sport Box Office	
Italy		Mola
United States		ESPN+

Preceded by vs. Dillian Whyte	Tyson Fury's bouts 3 December 2022	Succeeded by vs. Francis Ngannou
Preceded by vs. Kubrat Pulev II	Derek Chisora's bouts 3 December 2022	Succeeded by vs. Gerald Washington
