= Oleksandr Usyk vs. Derek Chisora =

Boxing match

Fright Night
- Date: 31 October 2020
- Venue: The SSE Arena, London, England
- Title(s) on the line: WBO Inter-Continental heavyweight title

Tale of the tape
Boxer	Oleksandr Usyk	Derek Chisora
Nickname	The Cat	War
Hometown	Simferopol, Crimea, Ukraine	London, England
Pre-fight record	17–0 (13 KOs)	32–9 (23 KOs)
Height	6 ft 3 in (191 cm)	6 ft 2 in (188 cm)
Weight	217 1/4 lb (99 kg)	255 1/2 lb (116 kg)
Style	Southpaw	Orthodox
Recognition	Former undisputed cruiserweight champion The Ring No. 4 ranked pound-for-pound fighter	WBO Inter-Continental heavyweight champion

Result
- Usyk wins via 12–round unanimous decision (117–112, 115–113, 115–113)

Oleksandr Usyk vs. Derek Chisora, billed as Fright Night, was a professional boxing match contested between former undisputed cruiserweight champion and the WBO's heavyweight mandatory challenger, Oleksandr Usyk, and WBO Inter-Continental heavyweight champion, Derek Chisora. The bout took place on 31 October 2020 at The SSE Arena, with Usyk winning by unanimous decision.

== Background ==
Usyk became the first ever four-belt undisputed cruiserweight champion in 2018 after winning the World Boxing Super Series tournament. Following his victory over Tony Bellew later in the year, Usyk made the decision to move up to the heavyweight division in 2019. Usyk made his heavyweight debut against late replacement Chazz Witherspoon, with Usyk winning by corner retirement in the seventh round.

Chisora regained composure following a loss against Whyte in December 2018, going on a 3-fight winning streak in 2019. Scoring a UD victory over Senad Gashi in April, and a second-round KO over former world title challenger Artur Szpilka in July, a fight in which Usyk was in attendance. In the post-fight interview, after defeating David Price in October, Chisora's manager, David Haye, commented on a potential fight with Usyk next.

On 11 March 2020, it was announced that Usyk would fight Chisora on 23 May at The O2 Arena in London. The fight was to take place on Sky Sports Box Office in the UK and on DAZN in the US. Sky Sports’ Head of Boxing Development Adam Smith, described the fight a "classic Heavyweight clash". If successful, Usyk would be first in line to fight for the WBO heavyweight title held by Anthony Joshua.

As part of his preparation for his bouts, Usyk sparred occasionally with former unified heavyweight champion Wladimir Klitschko. Chisora described the fight as his hardest ever. In preparation, he joked that he was taking dance lessons. Chisora said he would come at Usyk non-stop and aware he would have to take five shots before he would land just one. Usyk also acknowledged this was a tough step up in class for him and would treat it as a true test at heavyweight. Eddie Hearn revealed he was surprised Usyk took the fight, but was aware it was the fight Usyk needed to prepare for the world champions at heavyweight. He also said what Usyk gives up in terms of size and power, he would make up skill and speed, which would be key to victory. For further preparation, Chisora had sparred Byrant Jennings. His manager David Haye was working on getting heavyweights to spar with Chisora who could closely mirror Usyk's quickness. There was additional motivation for Chisora, as a win here would mean he would talk Usyk's WBO mandatory status. Haye revealed the game plan was not to outbox Usyk, but to make the fight rough and high pressure from the start. Haye thought Usyk's team were making a mistake in allowing this fight to take place. Usyk would be next in line to fight Joshua, who was scheduled to defend his titles against Kubrat Pulev later in the year. Usyk's manager Egis Klimas stated after the Chisora fight, they expected the mandatory to be called despite Joshua and his team discussing long-awaited fights against Tyson Fury and Deontay Wilder.

On 17 March, there was already talks about sports events being cancelled around UK due to the COVID-19 pandemic. Usyk had not been as active as he wanted to be since his win over Bellew in November 2018. Usyk's training camp was in isolation. Matchroom Boxing had already cancelled their shows around the world for March and April. Hearn confirmed he had contingency plans in place in case any fights were postponed. He had back-up dates in lined up for the Summer. As the days continued, Hearn admitted it was looking less likely the fight would take place on the original scheduled date. On 30 March, the British Boxing Board of Control extended the suspension until the end of May, following the guidelines from government and medical authorities, meaning the fight would be postponed. Hearn hinted the fight could take place in Saudi Arabia, if the country was to exit lockdown before the UK. He then said it could take place anywhere outside the UK.. It was looking likely that boxing events would take place from June 2020, without any spectators. Haye told IFL TV the fight needed to take place in front of a crowd.

A date in October 2020 was being discussed. Usyk and Chisora had continued to train for the upcoming fight. The fight was pushed back to 31 October 2020 due to the and the venue was moved to The SSE Arena in London. According to CBS Sports, Chisora was a +475 betting underdog. Usyk was reported to earn a £1.8 million purse. For his second heavyweight fight, Usyk weighed 217 ¼ pounds and Chisora weighed 255 ½ pounds, a 38-pound weight advantage.

== Fight details ==
From the opening bell, Chisora started a fast pace, attempting to close the distance and apply sustained pressure, landing hooks to the body on the inside, and forcing Usyk to be backed up against the ropes, with Usyk boxing at range defensively. As the early rounds progressed, Chisora continued to fight aggressively on the front foot, maintaining a high work rate, with Usyk landing clean straight left hands and quick counters on the back foot. In the middle rounds, Usyk was able to control the pace, using his superior movement and footwork to lead with solid jabs and land combination punches from angles on the outside, outboxing Chisora and escaping his attacks. In the later rounds, Chisora upped his output and remained on the offensive, pressing forward and successfully landing a series of hard right hands and body shots, with Usyk responding with several heavy flurries and scoring stiff blows repeatedly. All three judges unanimously scored the fight in favour of Usyk, with scores of 117–112, 115-113 and 115–113. Compubox showed that Usyk landed 194 of his 674 punches thrown (29%) and Chisora landed 139 of his 625 thrown (22%). Chisora did have the edge on power punches, landing 110 compared to 107 from Usyk.

== Aftermath ==
In his post-fight interview, Usyk reiterated his desire to fight Joshua, saying "Anthony, how are you? I'm coming for you, Anthony." Usyk said he didn't want to become just champion, but undisputed champion. Chisora felt he should have won the fight. He said, “Yeah, 100 percent. I was pushing the pace, I gave a couple of rounds away but I was pushing the pace. But the judges saw it a different way." His corner told him between rounds that he was ahead.

Usyk defeated Joshua on 25 September, by unanimous decision to capture the unified WBA (Super), IBF, WBO and IBO titles.

== Fight card ==
Weight Class		vs.		Method	Round	Time	Notes
Heavyweight	Oleksandr Usyk	def.	Derek Chisora (c)	UD	12/12		^{Note 1}
Lightweight	George Kambosos Jr.	def.	Lee Selby	SD	12/12		^{Note 2}
Cruiserweight	Tommy McCarthy	def.	Bilal Laggoune	MD	12/12		^{Note 3}
Super-bantamweight	Amy Timlin	vs.	Carly Skelly	SD	12		^{Note 4}
Middleweight	Savannah Marshall	def.	Hannah Rankin	TKO	7/10	1:59	^{Note 5}
Lightweight	Ramla Ali	def.	Eva Hubmayer	PTS	6/6		^{Note 6}

^Note 1 For WBO Inter-Continental heavyweight title
^Note 2 Final eliminator for IBF lightweight title
^Note 3 For European cruiserweight title
^Note 4 For inaugural Commonwealth female super-bantamweight title
^Note 5 For WBO female middleweight title
^Note 6 Ali's professional debut

== Broadcasting ==
Country	Broadcaster
Country	PPV
United Kingdom	Sky Sports Box Office
Ukraine	MEGOGO

Preceded by vs. Chazz Witherspoon	Oleksandr Usyk's bouts 31 October 2020	Succeeded by vs. Anthony Joshua
Preceded by vs. David Price	Derek Chisora's bouts 31 October 2020	Succeeded by vs. Joseph Parker
