= Derek Chisora =

Zimbabwean-British boxer (born 1983)

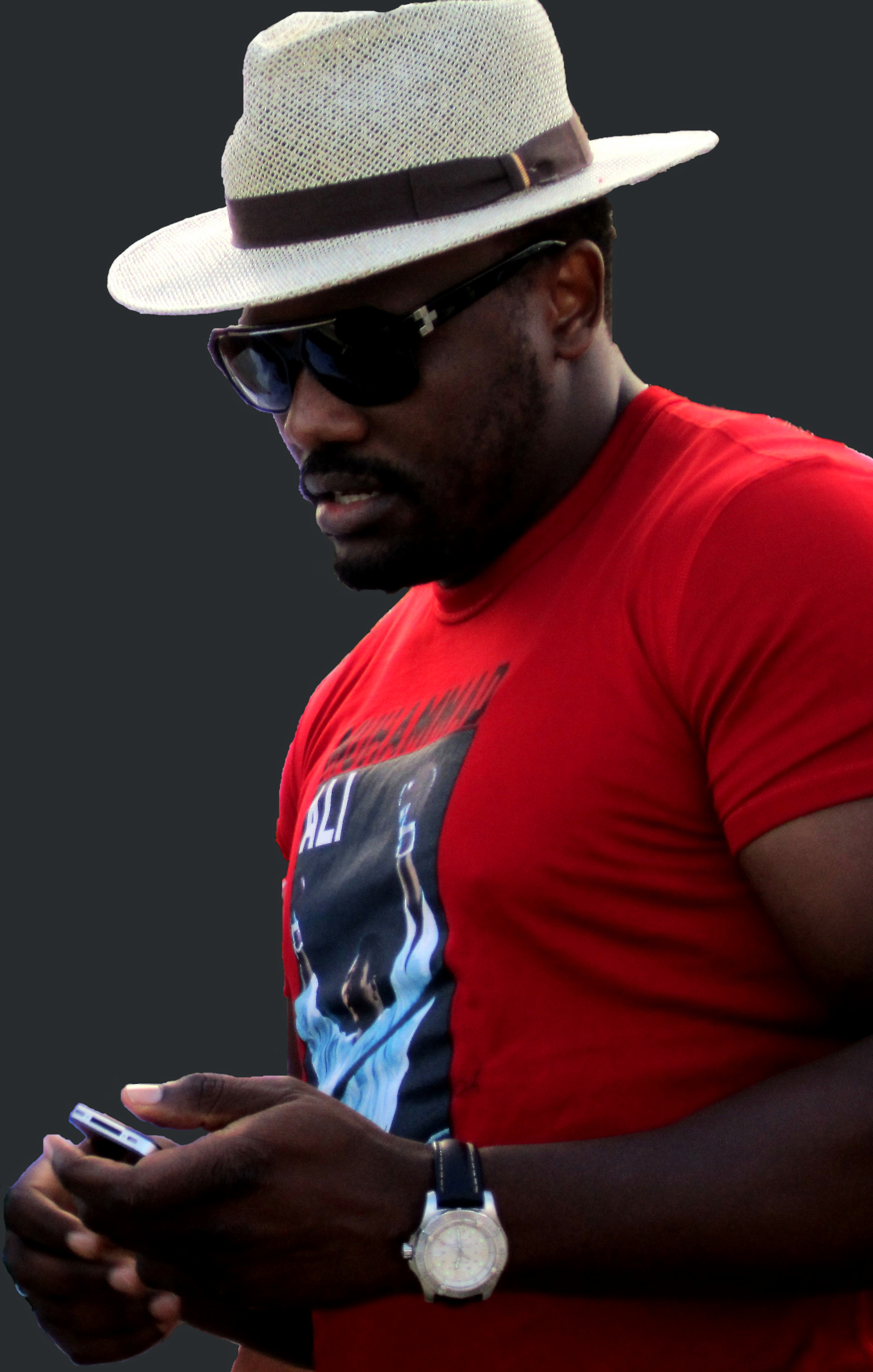
- Chisora in 2011

Personal information
- Nicknames: Del Boy; War
- Born: Dereck Chisora; 29 December 1983 (age 42) Harare, Zimbabwe
- Height: 6 ft 2 in (188 cm)
- Weight: Heavyweight

Boxing career
- Reach: 74 in (188 cm)
- Stance: Orthodox

Boxing record
- Total fights: 50
- Wins: 36
- Win by KO: 23
- Losses: 14
Medal record
Men's amateur boxing
Representing England
Four Nations Championships
Silver medal – second place	2006 Dublin	Super-heavyweight
English National Championships
Gold medal – first place	2006 London	Super-heavyweight
English Novice Championships
Gold medal – first place	2005 Leeds	Super-heavyweight

Derek Chisora (born 29 December 1983) is a British professional boxer. He has challenged twice for the WBC heavyweight title in 2012 and 2022. At regional level, he has held multiple heavyweight championships, including the British and Commonwealth titles from 2010 to 2011, and the European title from 2013 to 2014. As an amateur, he won the ABA super-heavyweight title in 2006. He holds a notable win over future world heavyweight champion Kubrat Pulev.

Chisora was ranked by BoxRec as among the world's top 10 heavyweights between 2013 and 2024, reaching his highest ranking at No. 5 in 2013 and 2020. Chisora's knockout-to-win percentage stands at 64%.

== Early life ==
Derek Chisora was born on 29 December 1983 in Mbare, a suburb south of the Zimbabwean capital Harare, the son of Viola and Paul Chisora. Following his parents' divorce when he was 4, Chisora spent his early years in Hatfield, in the care of his maternal grandmother and step-grandfather. As a teenager he attended Churchill School, where he became a paramedic for the school's sports team. Chisora and his family moved to the United Kingdom in 1999 when he was 16 and lived in Finchley, London.

== Amateur career ==
A late starter in the sport, Chisora began boxing aged 19. His club, Finchley ABC in Barnet, North London, was also home to heavyweight champion Anthony Joshua. Chisora had 20 amateur fights, including winning the 2005 Novice championships, knocking out Stewart O'Connellin in the first round, the 2006 ABA super heavyweight title, after defeating Tom Dallas in the final, and a silver medal at the Four Nations Championships.

== Professional career ==
=== Early career ===
Chisora turned professional under Frank Warren's Queensberry Promotions banner and was trained by Don Charles, alongside Dean Powell in his corner. Chisora made his professional debut on 17 February 2007 at the Wembley Arena in London, beating Hungarian István Kecskés by a technical knockout (TKO) in the second round. Chisora's second fight was against English heavyweight Tony Booth at the Millennium Stadium in Cardiff on 7 April 2007, on the undercard of Joe Calzaghe's successful WBO super-middleweight title defence against Peter Manfredo Jr., winning a points decision (PTS), by 40–36. Chisora's third fight was at the York Hall in London against Welshman Darren Morgan (5–1, 3 KOs) on 13 October 2007, winning on points after four rounds. Chisora stated in 2022 that Morgan was the hardest puncher he has ever faced in his career.

In January 2008, Chisora scored a four-round PTS victory over Paul Butlin at the York Hall, achieving his third points victory in a row, to take his record to 4–0. On the 11 April, Chisora was a wildcard for the inaugural Prizefighter series on Sky Sports. In June that year, in his first fight over six rounds, Chisora came up against the toughest test of his career in fellow undefeated British heavyweight prospect, Sam Sexton (7–0, 2 KOs). The bout was stopped in the final 30 seconds of the last round, when the referee decided Sexton was taking too much punishment and declared Chisora the winner by TKO. In Chisora's sixth fight, on 12 September 2008 at the Grosvenor House, in his first fight over eight rounds, he defeated American Shawn McLean via sixth-round stoppage. In Chisora's seventh fight, on 26 September 2008, against Lee Swaby, Chisora took his undefeated record to 7–0 with a third-round stoppage victory. In his eighth professional appearance, on 6 December 2008, Chisora defeated Neil Simpson at the ExCeL via a second-round corner retirement, leaving him with an 8–0 record at the end of his second year as a professional.

In Chisora's ninth bout, on 30 January 2009, he defeated Russian Daniil Peretyatko by PTS over eight rounds. In Chisora's tenth fight, on 22 May 2009, he defeated Paul Butlin for the second time, to extend his record to ten wins. Chisora was suspended for four months for biting Butlin's ear during the fifth round of their contest while in a clinch. The incident was missed by referee Dave Parris but TV replays proved conclusive, and as a result Chisora missed out on his fight for the British heavyweight title against Danny Williams. He was also fined £2,500. On 9 October 2009, in his eleventh bout, Chisora defeated Georgian Zurab Noniashvili, knocking Noniashvili down and winning by TKO in three rounds at York Hall.

He was supposed to face Matt Skelton for the vacant Southern Area heavyweight title at the Wembley Arena in London, but the bout was cancelled. On 20 January 2010, it was announced that Chisora would get a second chance to face Danny Williams on 13 February 2010 after Sam Sexton was forced to withdraw through injury from his match with Williams. Chisora welcomed the chance, saying, "It was my own fault the fight with Williams didn't go ahead, and I've been kicking myself ever since." Williams pulled out of the bout. Chisora instead fought Carl Baker in a British title eliminator, with the winner to face Williams. Baker entered with a unanimous decision win four months prior over Williams in the Prizefighter series. Chisora grabbed and kissed Baker at the weigh-in for the fight. Chisora stopped Baker in the second round.

=== British and Commonwealth champion ===
==== Chisora vs. Williams ====
On 2 May 2010, it was once again announced that Chisora would get yet another chance to face Danny Williams on 15 May 2010, at the Boleyn Ground in London, after Sam Sexton was forced to withdraw a second time from his rescheduled match with Williams, following his mother falling seriously ill. Chisora defeated former world title challenger Williams, winning the British title by stoppage. Chisora set the pace in the opening round and put Williams under pressure, Williams was warned twice for holding in the first round. In the second round, Chisora hurt Williams with a right uppercut before sending him to the canvas with a left hook. Williams beat the count but was met with a flurry of punches, resulting in Williams falling backwards towards the ropes, forcing referee Howard Foster to end the fight. After the fight, Williams announced his retirement, although he made a comeback in March 2011.

==== Chisora vs. Sexton II ====
On 18 September 2010, at the LG Arena, in Birmingham, Chisora, defending his title for the first time, defeated Sam Sexton, who was defending his title for the second time, in a rematch. Adding the Commonwealth title to his British title via ninth-round stoppage on the undercard of Kell Brook vs. Michael Jennings on Sky Box Office. Chisora and Sexton both started fast in the opening round, exchanging punches early, with Chisora landing a series of body shots inside, and Sexton working behind the jab. In the second, Chisora began setting the pace, leading with the jab, Sexton responded, sending Chisora back against the ropes with a flurry of punches. With Chisora landing combinations to the body as the round progressed. In the third, Chisora and Sexton continued trading punches, Chisora fighting aggressively, and Sexton countering on the back foot. In the fourth, Sexton went on the offensive, and was able to land a left hook, which momentarily slowed Chisora's output. With Chisora landing punches on the front foot, taking control for the remainder of the round. In the fifth round, Chisora and Sexton began to tire, as both men kept applying pressure up close. In the sixth, Chisora landed a number of clean punches on Sexton as his work rate decreased. In the seventh, Sexton began working behind the jab once again, boxing at range. In the eighth, Chisora began trying to close the distance, with Sexton on the defensive. The bell sounding to start the ninth marked the first time Chisora and Sexton had been past eight rounds. Chisora threw a barrage of unanswered left and right hands flush on the chin, backing Sexton against the ropes, prompting referee John Keane to stop the fight.

Chisora was scheduled to face unified IBF, WBO, IBO, and Ring magazine heavyweight champion, Wladimir Klitschko on 11 December 2010, at the SAP Arena, in Mannheim, but Klitschko pulled out of the fight three days prior, after suffering a torn abdominal muscle. The fight was postponed, and later rescheduled for 30 April 2011, with Klitschko once again pulling out of the fight due to not being fully recovered from his injury, and the bout was cancelled so Klitschko could fight a unification match against WBA heavyweight champion David Haye on 2 July.

==== Chisora vs. Fury ====
On 11 February 2011, the BBBofC installed English heavyweight champion, and undefeated prospect Tyson Fury as mandatory challenger for Chisora's British title. On 13 April 2011, Fury's promotional company, Hennessy Sports, won the purse bid to stage the contest. On 23 May 2011, it was announced that Chisora would defend his British and Commonwealth heavyweight titles against Fury on July 23, 2011, at the Wembley Arena in London, both men went into the fight with a record of 14–0. It was also announced the fight would be televised live in the United States on pay-per-view. American outlet Integrated Sports picked up the fight charging $24.95 for a live airing at 3 p.m. EDT. At the weigh-in, Chisora weighed a career-heavy 261 pounds, while Fury came in a 255.5 pounds. On the night, Fury won by unanimous decision, with scores of 117–112, 117–112, and 118–111, handing Chisora the first professional loss of his career, and gaining his two titles. Promoter Mick Hennessy revealed the fight peaked at around 3 million viewers on Channel 5.

=== European title challenge ===
He was supposed to face Larry Olubamiwo (10–2, 9 KOs) on 5 November 2011, at the Wembley Arena in London, but the bout was cancelled, following Olubamiwo withdrawing due to illness. Chisora defeated Lithuanian Remigijus Ziausys on 11 November in a six-round points decision at the North Bridge Leisure Centre in Halifax. Referee John Latham scored the fight 60–54 in favour of Chisora.

==== Chisora vs. Helenius ====
Chisora faced undefeated contender Robert Helenius (16–0, 11 KOs) on 3 December 2011, at the Hartwall Arena in Helsinki for the WBA and WBO Intercontinental, and vacant European heavyweight titles. At the time of the fight, Helenius was ranked #1 by the WBO, #3 by the WBA, #4 by the IBF, and #8 by the WBC. Chisora lost the bout in a controversial split decision, after two judges scored the fight 115–113 twice, in favour of Helenius, and the third scored 115–113 in favour of Chisora. The decision was highly criticised as most pundits and observers scored the fight in favor of Chisora. The Ring considered the outcome of the match "a gift", dropping Helenius' ranking from fifth to sixth challenger in their ratings. Chisora complained afterwards, demanding an immediate rematch on a neutral territory.

=== First WBC heavyweight title challenge ===
==== Chisora vs. Klitschko ====
Sources in Germany reported that Chisora was likely to fight WBC heavyweight champion Vitali Klitschko on 18 February 2012, at the Olympiahalle in Munich. On 12 December 2011, it was confirmed that Chisora would challenge Klitschko for the WBC heavyweight title. At the weigh-in, Chisora slapped Klitschko across the face when the two went head-to-head during the staredown. Chisora was quoted as saying after the slap "I ain't come here to play games I come here to fight". Moments before the fight, Chisora spat water in the face of Wladimir Klitschko whilst in the ring before the pre-fight introductions.

Klitschko boxed a disciplined fight with changing angles and superior footwork, and was able to keep the aggressive and offensive Chisora at range for the majority of the rounds. Despite bobbing and weaving, and constant pressure applied by Chisora, Klitschko was able to use his height and reach advantage to land clean straight right hands and power shots from a distance to outland Chisora, and control the pace as the bout progressed. At times, Chisora was able to deliver some punishment of his own, with most of his work coming with body shots and hooks to Klitschko's head, forcing Klitschko onto the back foot, and his best rounds being the eighth and twelfth round. All three judges unanimously scored the fight in favour of Klitschko, with scores of 118–110, 118–110 and 119–111. Despite being a decisive victory for Klitschko, Chisora earned credit for his chin and heart, and also for giving Klitschko his most competitive fight since his defeat to Lennox Lewis in 2003. Chisora also became only the fourth man (after Tino Hoffmann, Kevin Johnson and Shannon Briggs), to take Klitschko the twelve round distance.

During the Klitschko vs Chisora post-fight press conference, David Haye was present amongst the media in attendance. Haye began a verbal confrontation with both Klitschko, and his manager Bernd Bonte, challenging the WBC champion to a fight. Boente claimed Haye had turned down an opportunity to fight Klitschko, and that he would not get a second opportunity. Chisora then intervened, calling Haye an "embarrassment", and challenged Haye to a fight, to which Haye responded that Chisora had lost "three fights in a row". Haye continued his verbal assault. Chisora taunted Haye, asking him "how's your toe?", and then left the stage to confront Haye face to face and, in front of the assembled media, the two British fighters and several bystanders became involved in a mass brawl. Haye threw punches at Chisora whilst holding a bottle in one hand, leading to Chisora accusing Haye of glassing him. Chisora's trainer Don Charles was also involved in the brawl and Haye's long-time trainer Adam Booth received a cut to the forehead whilst trying to break things up; Booth would later accuse one of Chisora's entourage of striking him with a bottle during the confrontation, though the cause turned out to be a camera tripod that had been picked up and brandished by Haye at the end of the melee, whilst in the aftermath, Chisora was caught on video threatening to "shoot Haye".

German authorities sought both Haye and Chisora following their involvement in the brawl. On 19 February 2012, Chisora and Charles were arrested by German police at Munich Airport. Police detained Chisora, but released him without charge following questioning, whilst urging Haye to turn himself in. On 21 February 2012, Haye and Chisora both released formal statements about the incident. While Chisora "wholeheartedly" apologised for his involvement, Haye was less contrite, refusing to issue a direct apology for his involvement, claiming he had acted in self-defence.

=== Issues with WBC and BBBofC ===
Subsequent to a hearing in March the following year regarding the incident, Chisora had his British boxing license withdrawn, and the WBC initiated a motion to ban Chisora indefinitely and fine him for his involvement.

==== Chisora vs. Haye ====
On 8 May 2012, it was announced Haye would come out of retirement to fight Chisora, and the bout would take place on 14 July 2012, at the Boleyn Ground Stadium. It was also announced that BoxNation would promote the event in association with Team Sauerland and Hayemaker Promotions, and Alexander Povetkin would defend his WBA (Regular) heavyweight title against Hasim Rahman on the undercard. Additional security were present at the press conference and a steel fence was put in place to keep Haye and Chisora separated during the announcement.

On 9 May 2012, tickets went on sale, with 17,000 being sold on the first day of sale. On 18 May 2012, it was announced that the fight had been sanctioned by both the WBA and WBO, and Chisora and Haye would be licensed by the Luxembourg Boxing Federation.

In front of a crowd of 30,000 in attendance. Chisora entered the stadium, hooded and masked to the theme from Gladiator, and Haye to his entry music "Ain't No Stoppin' Us Now" by McFadden & Whitehead. In the opening two rounds, Chisora applied constant pressure, with Haye landing scoring shots at range. The bout heated up at the end of the third round, as Chisora closed the distance and caught Haye with a flush left hook after the bell had gone, which appeared to hurt Haye. Chisora emerged at the start of the fourth round aggressively, exchanging punches with Haye. Towards the end of the fifth round, Haye landed with a quick, hard left hook, followed by a right hand, which knocked down Chisora for the first time in his career. At the eighth count, Chisora made it to his feet, Haye connected with a series of punches, knocking Chisora down for a second time, and though he regained his feet again, the referee waved the fight off, therefore giving Haye the win by TKO in the fifth round.

=== Return to the ring ===
In March 2013, Chisora was issued a new British Boxing Board of Control licence. Chisora said, "I'm glad that this whole episode is finally behind me and I can carry on with my boxing career in my own country and with a British Boxing Board of Control licence."

Chisora made his ring return on 20 April 2013 at the Wembley Arena in London. He fought Argentinian Héctor Alfredo Ávila. Chisora told ESPN that he would dedicate his victory to late former Prime Minister Margaret Thatcher, who was an MP for Chisora's hometown of Finchley. Avila had one point deducted in the 6th round for holding and another in the 9th for use of the elbow, but was eventually stopped in the ninth round. When asked whom he would like to fight next, Chisora mentioned British rival David Price.

==== Chisora vs. Scott ====
It was confirmed that Chisora would return two months later on 20 July at the Wembley Arena, against undefeated American boxer Malik Scott (35–0–1, 12 KOs), for the vacant WBO International heavyweight title. Chisora won the bout via controversial knockout in round 6, following an over hand right. Scott was warned by the referee throughout the contest for repeated fouling and clinching, but was not penalized. Scott boxed well with his jab, while Chisora scored well with body punches. With 15 seconds left in the sixth round, Scott went down along the ropes from a right hand to the back of the ear, and took a knee, smiling. Scott got up at the count of nine, but then referee Edwards shouted "Out", ending the contest. Scott did not protest the seemingly premature stoppage but his corner did. Going into round six, Scott was ahead 48–47 on all three judges' scorecards. Scott's promoter, Dan Goossen stated he would lodge a protest. The BBBofC said they would not review the fight.

=== European champion ===
==== Chisora vs. Gerber ====
Chisora next fought on 21 September for the vacant European heavyweight title against 25-year-old German boxer Edmund Gerber (23–1) at the Copper Box Arena. The fight was announced 20 days prior to the fight taking place. Chisora controlled the fight from the opening bell, eventually drawing blood from Gerber after three rounds. The fight came to end in round five when Chisora threw combinations which went unanswered. The referee stepped in waiving the fight off. Chisora entered the ring in tears following the recent death of his mentor, Dean Powell. At the time of stoppage, Chisora was ahead 40–36 on all three judges' scorecards.

On 11 October, the BBBofC ordered purse bids for a fight between Chisora and David Price for The latter's British heavyweight title, with the fight to potentially take place by February 2014. The purse bid was due on 13 November. Chisora's promoter Frank Warren won the purse bid, but a fight was not made.

==== Chisora vs. Pala ====
On 30 November, Chisora defended his WBO International title against late replacement Ondřej Pála (32–3, 22 KOs). The fight was also for the vacant WBA International title. Chisora was originally scheduled to fight Arnold Gjergjaj, who broke his ribs in sparring. He was then replaced with Italian Matteo Mudugno, who pulled out injured. Pála being the third choice. Pála was able to land heavy left hooks in the first two rounds. In round three, Chisora trapped Pála in a corner and clubbed him to the head and body with a series of powerful shots which forced Pála to turn his back from the oncoming onslaught, forcing the referee to stop the contest. Chisora fought four times in 2013, winning all inside the distance.

==== Chisora vs. Johnson ====
On 27 January 2014, it was announced that Chisora would fight former world title challenger Kevin Johnson (29–4–1, 14 KOs) at the Copper Box in London on 15 February 2014. Chisora inflicted the first knockdown of Johnsons career in the fifth round, and won by unanimous decision after twelve rounds. The official judges' scorecards read 118–109, 118–109, and 118–110 in favour of Chisora. This set up a second fight against Tyson Fury in London, although after the fight, Chisora also called out former WBA (Regular) titleholder Alexander Povetkin.

==== Chisora vs. Fury II ====
Chisora and Fury were due to meet on 26 July 2014 in a rematch. On 21 July, Chisora was forced to pull out after sustaining a fractured hand in training. Belarusian Alexander Ustinov was lined up as Chisora's replacement in the bout scheduled to take place at the Manchester Arena, Fury pulled out of the fight after his uncle and former trainer Hughie Fury was taken seriously ill. Fury and Chisora rescheduled the rematch for 29 November 2014 at ExCeL London. The bout was shown live on BoxNation. The bout was dubbed 'The Fight for the Right' as it was a final eliminator for the WBO heavyweight title and a shot at champion Wladimir Klitschko. Chisora struggled with Fury's height, reach and movement, with Fury winning the rounds comfortably until trainer Don Charles had seen enough and pulled Chisora out at the end of the tenth round. Fury used his jab to trouble Chisora and kept on the outside creating a distance with his longer reach. Chisora failed to land any telling punches, and due to Fury's awkward fighting style, end up hitting him below the belt. Chisora was warned by referee Marcus McDonnell in the first round.

=== Signing with Sauerland ===
==== Chisora vs. Pulev ====
After a period of eight months without a fight since his defeat to Fury, Chisora won five fights in five months against low ranked opponents, helping set up a fight for the recently vacated European heavyweight title against highly ranked Bulgarian Kubrat Pulev in Hamburg on 7 May 2016. The bout was also an eliminator for the IBF heavyweight title. Despite what had seemed a fairly comfortable points win for Pulev the fight ended in a split decision, with two judges scoring it 118–110 and 116–112 in Pulev's favour while the third scored it 115–113 for Chisora. The defeat left Chisora's chances of a world title shot against IBF champion Anthony Joshua in doubt.

Chisora made a comeback in Sweden on 10 September 2016 against Bosnian Drazan Janjanin and scored a second-round knockout victory following a body shot. Although Janjanin beat the count, the referee waved the fight off.

==== Chisora vs. Whyte ====
Terms were finally agreed for a fight between Chisora and British heavyweight champion Dillian Whyte to fight in a WBC title eliminator for Whyte's British heavyweight title. The fight took place in Manchester on the undercard of the Anthony Joshua vs. Éric Molina heavyweight title fight. Chisora and Whyte were feuding over the year through social media. The hype continued through to the press conference on 7 December when, following Whyte's comment that he'd attack Chisora anytime he would see him after the fight, Chisora picked up the table he was sitting at and threw it towards Whyte, just missing everyone in the way which included the promoters and trainers. As a result, the BBBofC withdrew its sanction of the fight so that the British title was not at stake. Instead, Whyte's WBC International title was at stake. Chisora lost the fight by split decision with two judges scoring the fight 115–113 and 115–114 for Whyte and one scoring 115–114 in favour of Chisora. Whyte was hurt a number of times in the fight by Chisora in the eighth, tenth and twelfth rounds. On two occasions in the twelfth, Whyte was knocked off balance by Chisora after being hit with huge shots to the head. Post fight, Whyte stated he would not give Chisora a rematch, only to change his mind later to say the potential was there. In March 2017, in an interview, Chisora claimed he offered Whyte £1.1 million for a rematch, which Whyte declined.

On 24 March 2017, it was announced that Chisora would get his much awaited rematch against Finnish boxer Robert Helenius (24–1, 15 KOs) at the Hartwall Arena in Helsinki, Finland. The same arena they fought at when Helenius won a controversial split decision in December 2011. The bout would be contested for the vacant WBC Silver heavyweight title on 27 May 2017. In December 2015, the EBU ordered for Chisora and Helenius to meet, where the winner would fight Anthony Joshua. A purse bid deadline was set for 21 January 2016, but no progress was made. The fight was postponed on 16 May to take place after Summer 2017. There was no specific reason given by promoter Nisse Sauerland as to why the fight had been postponed.

=== Signing with Matchroom ===
On pursuing a rematch with Dillian Whyte, on 31 August 2017, Chisora announced that he had split with promoter Team Sauerland, but re-signed with manager Steve Goodwin. On 20 September Eddie Hearn announced that Chisora had signed with Matchroom Sport, making his debut on the Paul Butler-Stuart Hall undercard on 30 September at the Echo Arena in Liverpool live on Sky Sports. Hearn believed if Chisora could win two fights by the end of the year, possibly winning the European title in the process, he would have a good case to fight Whyte again. Hearn said, "You know what you are going to get with 'Del Boy', plenty of drama and a load of heart. He will return to action in Liverpool and challenge for the European title in November. We will work towards a Whyte rematch for early next year. It's a fight that I think boxing needs to see again." Chisora fought Croatian Robert Filipovic (4–2, 3 KOs) at the Echo Arena in Liverpool, on 30 September. Filipovic was a late replacement for Jay McFarlane (3–3, 2 KOs). The fight was scheduled for 6 and ended in round 5 when the referee had seen enough, giving Chisora the win via TKO. Filipovic had one point deducted in the 4th round and another in the 5th for holding, which was done to prolong the fight. Chisora explained that he had the power to put his opponent away, but wanted to enjoy the fight.

==== Chisora vs. Kabayel ====
On 25 September, Hearn revealed Chisora would challenge European heavyweight champion Agit Kabayel (16–0, 12 KOs) at the Casino de Monte Carlo Salle Medcin in Monte Carlo, Monaco on 4 November 2017. In a lethargic performance where he was outboxed by Kabayel, Chisora suffered a 12-round majority decision defeat. One judge scored the fight a 114–114 draw, whilst the remaining two judges' scored the fight 115–113 and 115–114 for Kabayel, giving Chisora his 8th professional loss. Chisora started the fight slow, remaining patient. He became more active after round 6, but failed to bustle the attack on Kabayel, who moved well with his feet. Kabayel also used quick combinations and jabs to win many of the rounds. Speaking to Sky Sports after the bout, Chisora said, "I'm not going to complain, I lost the fight. I always bounce back so I'm not worried." Eddie Hearn stated a rematch with Chisora and Whyte would still be possible.

On 3 February 2018, whilst backstage at The O2 Arena in London for Lawrence Okolie vs. Isaac Chamberlain, Hearn told YouTube channel iFL TV, Chisora would be returning to the ring on 24 March on the undercard of Dillian Whyte vs. Lucas Browne, which would also take place at the O2 Arena. Also backstage, Chisora met with David Haye and Joe Joyce, where Chisora revealed Haye had contacted his manager Steve Goodwin and offered £60,000 for him to fight Joyce. Chisora later stated if the money was right, he would fight Joyce on the Tony Bellew vs. David Haye II card on 5 May 2018. After Joyce knocked out Rudolf Jozic on 16 February, Haye revealed a new six-figure offer would be presented to Chisora, which would see him earn around the same purse he received in his loss to Kabayel. On 1 March, Joyce claimed Chisora had rejected the fight completely.

Matchroom confirmed French boxer Zakaria Azzouzi (14–2–2, 10 KOs) as Chisora's opponent. After a slow first round where Chisora used his jab and stalked Azzouzi, Chisora dropped Azzouzi with a big right hand in the next round. The fight was then stopped by referee Robert Williams after Azzouzi struggled to get to his feet. The official time of the stoppage was at 2:12 of round 2. After the fight, whilst being interviewed by the Sky Sports team, Chisora called over David Haye and his fighter Joe Joyce. Prior to calling them over, Chisora referred to Joyce as a Chihuahua. Chisora first asked Haye if he had confidence in Joyce and then stated, "In front of the British public on live television, I'll make a deal with you right now: if he (Joyce) beats me you write me a cheque of £1, if I beat him you give me your purse against Tony (Bellew) and your TV rights". Haye rejected the offer. Chisora then told Haye to not mention his name again. Haye told Sky Sports, "We offered him the same money he got for (Kubrat) Pulev, more money than he got for the European title, but you said no. Okay, we understand".

==== Chisora vs. Takam ====
After a month of speculation, on 15 June 2018, a fight between Chisora and former world title challenger Carlos Takam was finally announced to take place at the O2 Arena in London on 28 July 2018, with the bout taking place on the undercard of Dillian Whyte vs. Joseph Parker on Sky Box Office. Takam started the fight out-working Chisora, who spent most of the rounds against the ropes looking for counters. Chisora began to take more punishment as the fight progressed and fell clearly behind on the scorecards. At one point in round 6, referee Howard Foster was looking at possibly stopping the fight with Chisora taking shots against the ropes. By round 7, Takam was landing the better shots and looked to be on his way to an eventual stoppage win; however in round 8, Chisora connected with a big right hand to Takam's head, sending him to the canvas. Takam made it unsteadily to his feet and the fight resumed only for Chisora to immediately land an identical punch and drop Takam a second time. Foster then stopped the fight with 1 minute remaining in the round. With the win, Chisora claimed the vacant WBA International title. Promoter Hearn and pundits in the arena stated he had made his way back into the heavyweight title mix. After the bout, on who he would like to fight next, he said, "I definitely want the winner of the main event (Whyte vs. Parker)." Hearn stated in the post-fight press conference that he would issue a challenge to WBC champion Deontay Wilder to defend his title against Chisora in either Brooklyn or London.

==== Chisora vs. Whyte II ====
In mid October 2018, Whyte and Cuban boxer Luis Ortiz appeared to have a war of words and called each other out, with Ortiz stating he would come to the UK and fight Whyte on 22 December, a potential PPV date allocated to the possible Whyte vs. Chisora rematch. After hearing this, Chisora came out saying 'No one wants to see that [Whyte-Ortiz]', that he was 'the Money Man' and Whyte should fight him if he wants to earn more money. Hearn also stated despite Ortiz putting his name forward, Chisora was the front-runner to fight Whyte.

On 17 October, it was reported that Chisora had hired former rival David Haye as his new manager. The news came as a shock as both Chisora and Haye had been rivals since before they had their grudge match in 2012 and in early 2018 were involved in broken down talks when Haye tried to persuade Chisora to fight his boxer Joe Joyce. Both Haye and Chisora sat down in the Sky studios and talked about their relationship, explaining how they came to a deal. They also stated that Chisora will no longer go by the name 'Del Boy' and would now be 'WAR'. On 22 October, Whyte told Sky Sports that Chisora needed to sign a deal quick or he would look at other options. On 1 November, the rematch was announced to take place on 22 December at The O2 Arena on Sky Sports Box Office. Chisora weighed 246.2 pounds, his lightest since he fought Kubrat Pulev and Whyte weighed 246.5 pounds. Chisora lost the fight via KO in the eleventh round. At the time of stoppage, two judges had Chisora ahead 95–94 and one judge had Whyte ahead 95–94.

=== Change of trainers ===
On 15 February 2019, it was announced that Chisora had split with long-time trainer Don Charles and linked up with Rotherham based, experienced trainer Dave Coldwell, who was most well-known for leading Tony Bellew to win the WBC cruiserweight title. Speaking on the new partnership, Chisora said, "People know by now that I don't like to do things the conventional way. This is a new direction for me, I'm excited to be working with Dave Coldwell, I'm learning every day, I'm buzzing. Dave has done amazing work with my good friend Tony Bellew and his other boxers. I'm hungry to get back in the ring again, I will be back with new armoury I'm ready for WAR." Coldwell revealed it was Chisora's manager David Haye to called him. Coldwell confirmed any animosity between him and Haye was over.

==== Chisora vs. Gashi ====
On 11 March 2019, Matchroom Boxing announced a doubleheader which included Chisora making his ring return on 20 April, as the co-main event to Dave Allen vs. Lucas Browne at The O2 Arena in London. Chisora's opponent was German boxer Senad Gashi (17–2, 17 KOs). Chisora hoping to get a fight with Joseph Parker finalised but claimed Parker ducked him, who said he needed more time to prepare. Gashi didn't believe bringing in Coldwell would help change anything in Chisora's style. He said, "Derek is an old dog and it's hard to teach an old dog new tricks. Derek is a very experienced guy, he doesn't have a boxing brain but his toughness and experience makes up for that." Gashi was known to UK fans after he was a last minute replacement in fighting Carlos Takam on the Whyte vs. Chisora rematch undercard, where he went on to lose via a 7th round stoppage. On fight week, Gashi revealed that he had already beaten Chisora in his mind, "I definitely think I can win against Derek Chisora. I have visualised this fight in my head many times. I have fought in my head 10 times against Derek Chisora, nine times I won and one time I got disqualified." Gashi said he had a good camp with his team and was much better prepared compared to the 3-day notice he received against Takam. Chisora weighed 259 pounds and 29 year old Gashi weighed 220.3 pounds.

Chisora won a comfortable unanimous points decision on the judges' scorecards, which read 99–91, 100–90, and 100–91. Although Chisora usually entertains, the fight was heavily described as dull, with fans and pundits accusing Gashi as being a spoiler. Gashi very reluctantly engaged and Chisora's lack of cutting off the ring and being slow on his feet, meant there was little action. The Sky Sports also said we would likely never see Gashi back on a UK card, on the back of his performance. New trainer Coldwell tried to look for positives in the fight. He was looking forward to the remainder of the year and the fights they would work together moving forward.

==== Chisora vs. Szpilka ====
On 13 June 2019, a fight between Chisora and former world title challenger Artur Szpilka (22–3, 15 KOs) was announced to take place at the O2 Arena in London on 20 July, with the bout taking place on the undercard of Dillian Whyte vs. Oscar Rivas live on Sky Sports Box Office. The fight was being built up as a crossroads fight, a must-win for both, to keep them in the mix for bigger heavyweight paydays. Chisora knew the pressure was on based on his last performance. Chisora said Gashi would never fight on UK soil again following his performance in their fight. Gashi's performance also meant Chisora was unable to give the fans a good fight. With the Joseph Parker fight looming in the future, trainer Dave Coldwell also wanted Chisora to put in a performance and make a statement. According to Coldwell, Chisora had prepared well for southpaw training in camp. A win here would set up the Parker fight for the fall. During the build up and press conferences, Szpilka steered clear from any trash talk claiming his fists will do the talking. Coldwell and Haye did their best to enrage Szpilka. He also warned Chisora not to look past him, knowing the Parker fight was likely ahead. Chisora weighed in at 257 pounds and Szpilka weighed in at 243 pounds. During the face-off, both boxers wore bandanas of their countries flags over their mouth. Chisora tried to get under Szpilka's skin by showing him the middle finger. Szpilka didn't respond.

The fight was scheduled for 10-rounds. Chisora produced a ruthless display and defeated Szpilka via 2nd Round KO. The first round started slow as Szpilka did his best to keep out of Chisora's reach and landing the occasional left hand. In round 2, Szpilka was first stunned to the head following a looping right hand. He began to cover up against the ropes as Chisora landed a five-punch barrage. Szpilka became defenceless and the last blow was a right hand, which dropped Szpilka. The referee stepped in and stopped the fight. During the post-fight interviews, Chisora said, "I want Joseph Parker, bring him on. Let's hope that Australian chicken doesn't go ducking." Hearn and Haye also said it was the fight to make next.

==== Chisora vs. Price ====
On 31 August 2019, a fight between Chisora and Parker was announced to take place at the O2 Arena in London on 26 October, with the bout taking place as the co-main event to the World Boxing Super Series: Light welterweight final between Regis Prograis and Josh Taylor live on Sky Sports Box Office. On 19 September, it was reported that Chisora and Dave Coldwell had parted ways on good terms. The reason due to Coldwell being based in Rotherham, having commitments with local boxers and Chisora who was based in London, and often fighting in London. Chisora asked Coldwell to train in London and Coldwell was unable to accept the terms.

On 2 October, it was announced Parker had been forced to withdraw from the fight due to a spider bite that was causing illness during training. On 8 October, 36 year old fellow British heavyweight David Price (25–6, 20 KOs) was announced as Chisora's replacement opponent. Price was on a 3-fight win streak since being stopped by Sergey Kuzmin on September 2018, most recently defeating David Allen. Price had been keeping fit and stayed in the gym through Summer knowing an opportunity could come at anytime. On 14 October, Parker's manager David Higgins announced that Parker had recovered from the spider bite. He revealed the illness caused Parker to miss 3 weeks of training, the reason he was not able to fight on 26 October. Parker was hoping the fight would be rescheduled in the near future. Speaking ahead of the fight, Chisora admitted he had a soft spot for Price, as they went through the ranks together. He said, "Come fight week, everything goes out the window, man. Best friend or not best friend, I'm coming to destroy you. After that we can shake hands and love each other, fight week it's war." During fight week, Chisora revealed Steve Broughton as his new trainer, who would work his corner for the fight. He retained Ruben Tabares as his strength and conditioning coach. Broughton was known to have worked with former world champions Josh Taylor, Carl Frampton and David Haye previously. Hearn spoke about the opportunities for the winner, possibly to fight former undisputed cruiserweight champion Oleksandr Usyk in 2020 at heavyweight. This all depended on what Usyk wanted to do. Hearn stated the winner of Chisora and Price would get a big fight next regardless. Chisora weighed in at 260¼ pounds and Price was slightly heavier at 264¼ pounds.

Chisora won the fight via 4th-round TKO. He came out throwing punches, looking to land, but Price, the taller boxer, was looking to hold and at the same time land some of his own shots. In round two, the action continued with both trying to land shots. Round 3 saw Chisora increase the pressure and upped the pace of the fight. Chisora got Price on the ropes following some shots to the head and it looked as if the end was near. Price landed a right uppercut on Chisora's chin, backing him up. Round 4 started and Chisora did not take any chances in trying to get Price out of there. He landed shots on the inside overwhelming Price, who began to breathe heavily, eventually dropping to the canvas for the count. Price managed to beat the count with the help of the ropes looking distressed. It appeared as thought referee Howard Foster was going to let the action continue until his corner threw in the towel. Some felt it was premature, however Price took some heavy damage. In the post-fight interviews, Chisora said, "I came to seek and destroy. If I caught him, he would be gone. It was just business. He stepped up and saved the show. He buzzed me and caught me with an uppercut but I recovered easily and I came back and finish the job." Chisora was hoping to be added to the Andy Ruiz Jr. vs. Anthony Joshua rematch undercard, which was scheduled to take place in Saudi Arabia in December 2019.

==== Chisora vs. Usyk ====
On 11 March 2020, it was announced that Oleksandr Usyk would fight Chisora on 23 May at The O2 Arena in London. The fight was to take place on Sky Sports Box Office in the UK and on DAZN in the US. Sky Sports' Head of Boxing Development Adam Smith, described the fight a "classic Heavyweight clash". If successful, Usyk would be first in line to fight for the WBO heavyweight title held by Anthony Joshua.

As part of his preparation for his bouts, Usyk sparred occasionally with former unified heavyweight champion Wladimir Klitschko. Chisora described the fight as his hardest ever. In preparation, he joked that he was taking dance lessons. Chisora said he would come at Usyk non-stop and aware he would have to take five shots before he would land just one. Usyk also acknowledged this was a tough step up in class for him and would treat it as a true test at heavyweight. Chisora was entering the fight on the back of a three-fight win streak, following his stoppage loss to Dillian Whyte in 2018. Eddie Hearn revealed he was surprised Usyk took the fight, but was aware it was the fight Usyk needed to prepare for the world champions at heavyweight. He also said what Usyk gives up in terms of size and power, he would make up skill and speed, which would be key to victory. For further preparation, Chisora had sparred Byrant Jennings. His manager David Haye was working on getting heavyweights to spar with Chisora who could closely mirror Usyk's quickness. There was additional motivation for Chisora, as a win here would mean he would talk Usyk's WBO mandatory status. Haye revealed the game plan was not to outbox Usyk, but to make the fight rough and high pressure from the start. Haye thought Usyk's team were making a mistake in allowing this fight to take place. Usyk would be next in line to fight Joshua, who was scheduled to defend his titles against Kubrat Pulev later in the year. Usyk's manager Egis Klimas stated after the Chisora fight, they expected the mandatory to be called despite Joshua and his team discussing long-awaited fights against Tyson Fury and Deontay Wilder.

On 17 March, there was already talks about sports events being cancelled around UK due to the COVID-19 pandemic. Usyk had not been as active as he wanted to be since his win over Bellew in November 2018. Usyk's training camp was in isolation. Matchroom Boxing had already cancelled their shows around the world for March and April. Hearn confirmed he had contingency plans in place in case any fights were postponed. He had back-up dates in lined up for the Summer. As the days continued, Hearn admitted it was looking less likely the fight would take place on the original scheduled date. On 30 March, the British Boxing Board of Control extended the suspension until he end of May, following the guidelines from government and medical authorities, meaning the fight would be postponed. Hearn hinted the fight could take place in Saudi Arabia, if the country was to exit lockdown before the UK. He then said it could take place anywhere outside the UK.. It was looking likely that boxing events would take place from June 2020, without any spectators. Haye told IFL tv the fight needed to take place in front of a crowd.

A date in October 2020 was being discussed. Usyk and Chisora had continued to train for the upcoming fight. The fight was pushed back to 31 October 2020 due to the and the venue was moved to The SSE Arena in London. According to CBS Sports, Chisora was a +475 betting underdog. Usyk was reported to earn a £1.8 million purse. For his second heavyweight fight, Usyk weighed 217 ¼ pounds and Chisora weighed 255 ½ pounds, a 38 pound weight advantage.

Chisora lost by unanimous decision. From the opening bell, Chisora started a fast pace, attempting to close the distance and apply sustained pressure, landing hooks to the body on the inside, and forcing Usyk to be backed up against the ropes, with Usyk boxing at range defensively. As the early rounds progressed, Chisora continued to fight aggressively on the front foot, maintaining a high work rate, with Usyk landing clean straight left hands and quick counters on the back foot. In the middle rounds, Usyk was able to control the pace, using his superior movement and footwork to lead with solid jabs and land combination punches from angles on the outside, outboxing Chisora and escaping his attacks. In the later rounds, Chisora upped his output and remained on the offensive, pressing forward and successfully landing a series of hard right hands and body shots, with Usyk responding with several heavy flurries and scoring stiff blows repeatedly. All three judges unanimously scored the fight in favour of Usyk, with scores of 117–112, 115–113 and 115–113.

==== Chisora vs. Parker ====
Derek Chisora vs. Joseph Parker had originally been scheduled to take place on 26 October 2019, but Parker was forced to pull out after suffering a spider bite injury. After the pair's respective fights against unbeaten opponents, Oleskandr Usyk and Junior Fa, it was announced on 19 March 2021 that Chisora would fight the former WBO heavyweight champion on 1 May 2021 for the vacant WBO Inter-Continental heavyweight title, live on Sky Sports Box Office. The day before the fight, the event looked to be in jeopardy as Chisora threatened to pull out, after losing a coin toss that meant he would have to walk to the ring first, which he objected to. The dispute was resolved on the day of the fight, and the fight went ahead as planned.

On the night, Chisora started the fight strong, knocking Parker down in just seven seconds of the first round with a big right hand. He closed the distance and pressured his opponent in the early rounds, but Parker rallied back in the mid-to-late rounds, boxing well off the back foot and using his jab effectively to win a split decision, with scorecards of 115–113, 116–111 in his favour, and 115–113 in favour of Chisora.

==== Chisora vs. Parker II ====
Following the somewhat controversial split decision victory in their first in May, both Joseph Parker and Chisora expressed interest in an immediate rematch. On 16 September 2021, it was announced that a rematch on 18 December, again at the Manchester Arena, this time it was being broadcast Speaking to BBC Sport in the build up Parker would suggest that he might retire if he lost the rematch, saying "I just want to beat him properly this time. If I can't beat Derek then I have to really look at myself and where I go from there."

Parker largely dominated the bout, landing many overhand rights and uppercuts that hurt Chisora. A big right uppercut from Parker had Chisora wobbling into the ropes, which the referee Howard Foster ruled a knockdown as the ropes had kept him up. Another uppercut sent Chisora down in the seventh and again in the eight. Chisora was again in trouble in the ninth, it appeared at one point that the referee was on the verge of stepping in and waving it off, but Chisora was able to the survive the round. Chisora appeared to be the fresher in the last two rounds but he was ever able to hurt Parker. The bout went the full 12 rounds and the judges all scored the bout for Parker with scores of 115–110, 115–111 and 114–112 giving him a unanimous decision victory. According to CompuBox, Parker landed 144 punches with 31% accuracy, against Chisora's 122 punches with 26% accuracy.

Speaking in the ring after result, Parker said that "Derek always comes for war, he was one tough guy and never stopped coming forward until the end, we practised and practised that uppercut. What a Christmas present. I felt a lot stronger. It was important to start strong and not be negative from the beginning. You can see there are improvements to be made. Derek Chisora is a credit to the sport of boxing."Attention was drawn to the scorecards which were widely perceived to be overly generous to Chisora: reporters Mike Coppinger opined that "the judges were trying to rob" Parker, while Chris Mannix stated, "These are criminally, criminally, bad scorecards."

==== Chisora vs. Pulev II ====
On 21 March 2022, Hearn made an offer to former world champion Andy Ruiz Jr. to fight Chisora. He reportedly made the offer to PBC, who declined and wanted more money. According to Hearn, it was a great fight to make and one he wanted to make. On 22 May, Chisora signed his side of the contract for a fight against Polish boxer Adam Kownacki. A possible date of 9 July was being looked at for Chisora's next fight. Chisora was desperate to get back in the ring following a 3-fight losing streak. Kownacki was also coming off back-to-back stoppage losses to Robert Helenius. At this time, there was no word if Kownacki was going to sign the fight.

After weeks trying to find an opponent, on 7 June, Matchroom Boxing announced Chisora would headline once again at The O2 Arena in London streaming live on DAZN in a rematch against former two-time world title challenger Kubrat Pulev (29–2, 14 KOs) on 9 July 2022 for the vacant WBA International heavyweight title. Pulev won their first encounter via split decision in 2016. Since their first meeting, Chisora had won 7 and lost 7 of his 14 bouts. This was a quick turnaround for Pulev who had only come off a 10 round unanimous decision victory over Jerry Forrest in May.

As the fight was announced, fans took to social media to express their dissatisfaction in the fight, with some still calling for Chisora to retire following his recent form. Some were looking forward to Kownacki being named as Chisora's opponent. Hearn defended his decision to put the fight on. He explained Chisora being a fan-favourite and still being able to put on fan-friendly fights was the reason he kept getting fights. He did admit however, the headline acts would slowly diminish if Chisora continued to take losses. The pair had a heated face-off at the final press conference. It started off with a handshake and ended with them clashing their heads together, with neither attempted to break. The security then had to intervene. At the weigh-in, which took place at Canary Wharf's East Wintergarden, Chisora wore a mask of Boris Johnson, who recently resigned as Prime Minister of United Kingdom. Chisora weighed 258 pounds and Pulev checked in at 250 pounds.

In front of a reported 7,000 fans in attendance, Chisora defeated Pulev via split decision with one judge scoring it 116–112 in favour of Pulev and the other two scoring it 116–112 and 116–114 in favour of Chisora. The fight was described as thrilling, punishing and gruelling and possible fight of the year contender. Chisora attacked the body a lot throughout. He also landed a lot of overhand right to Pulev's head. Pulev's chin held up and he absorbed a lot of the shots. As the fight went on, Chisora began to tire and Pulev looked the fresher of the two. He landed uppercuts of his own. Despite being badly cut over goth eyes, Pulev continued to come forward and throw shots. Chisora looked tired during the second half of the fight and spent time covering up against the ropes.

The consensus was the fight was close and could have gone either way. According to CompuBox, Chisora landed 171 punches of his 526 thrown (32.5%), with 102 of them landing to Pulev's body, who landed 200 of his 796 thrown (25.1%). Both landed 133 power shots apiece. It was Chisora's 86 power shots to the body that was the difference and more accurate punches came from Chisora also. After the fight Chisora told his promoter Eddie Hearn that he wanted to fight former WBC champion Deontay Wilder next. Chisora said he did not want easy fights and admitted he was not far off retiring, "I last won a fight three years ago… I'm happy today but at the same time I'm sad. I don't have many left in me but what I do have I will give my all to you guys. I don't have many left, so my next couple of fights... I'm on my way out." Chisora was praised on social media by many boxing personalities.

=== Second WBC heavyweight title challenge ===
==== Chisora vs. Fury III ====
On 20 October 2022, it was announced that Chisora would fight Tyson Fury in a trilogy bout for the WBC heavyweight title on 3 December at Tottenham Hotspur Stadium in London, live on BT Sport Box Office. Chisora weighed in at 260.6lbs to Fury at 268.8lbs.

Chisora fought bravely, but was outclassed by Fury from the very start. This culminated in the referee asking Chisora if he wanted to stop the fight at the end of the 9th round, which he refused to do. However, the fight was ultimately stopped ten seconds from the end of the 10th round, which was met with no complaints from Chisora.

==== Chisora vs. Washington ====
On 3 August 2023, a fight between Chisora and former world title challenger Gerald Washington (20–5, 13 KOs) was announced to take place at The O2 Arena in London on 12 August 2023, with the bout taking place on the undercard of Anthony Joshua vs. Robert Helenius live on DAZN PPV. Joshua was originally scheduled to fight long-time rival Dillian Whyte, however Whyte was taken off the card due to failing a drug test. Heading into the fight, both Chisora and Washington were looking to rebound after recent losses. Chisora had only won one of his last 5 and Washington had only won 2 of his last 7 bouts. In February 2023, Washington left Premier Boxing Champions and appointed former boxer Malik Scott as his new head trainer. The fight was Washington's first since January 2022. Chisora expected Washington to avoid exchanges and be on the backfoot on fight night. Chisora said he would chase him down and catch him, predicting a 3rd round stoppage. The fight was scheduled for 10-rounds. Chisora stepped on the scales at 251.1 pounds, whilst Washington was lighter, weighing in at 237.9 pounds. It was revealed that Washington was also approached to step in and fight Joshua in the main event. Malik Scott declined the offer as it was insufficient to headline a PPV against Joshua.

Chisora won by unanimous decision after ten rounds. The official judges' scorecards read 98–93, 97–94, and 96–94 in favour of Chisora. There was little action mostly due to Washington showing little interest in engaging and picked his shots on the back foot. Chisora won most rounds by default, outworking and showing the judges he wanted to win. In the 7th round, Washington landed a six-punch combination which rocked Chisora. This was the most offence Washington showed in the entire fight. Chisora did not look good at the end of the round, looking beaten. Washington did not capitalise on this for the remainder of the fight, staying on the move, despite his trainer telling him to engage more. Washington was not able to let his hands go. Chisora spoke to iFL TV after the fight and shouted that he was not going to retire yet, saying that "It's not time yet." Many critics had urged him to retire.

=== Re-signing with Queensberry ===
==== Chisora vs. Joyce ====
On 22 May 2024, it was officially announced that Chisora would face fellow British heavyweight Joe Joyce (16–2, 15 KOs) at The O2 Arena in London, England on 27 July. Frank Warren discussed the fight and called it 'old school' and six years in the making. Upon turning professional, David Haye, who was Joyce's promoter at the time, made several attempts at making the fight, being unsuccessful in the process. By the time the fight would take place, Chisora would have been out of action for 11 months, having last defeated Gerald Washington in August 2023 on the Joshua-Helenius undercard. A week before the event, Chisora admitted he was already looking past Joyce and planning his next steps in boxing, regardless of the result. With this being his 48th professional fight, Chisora wanted to reach 50 professional fights and then to retire. He said it had always been 50, ever since he turned professional. Joyce weighed 281.2 pounds and Chisora stepped on the scales lighter at 256.7 pounds, but nearly 5 pounds heavier than his previous fight. Throughout the build up, Chisora teased Joyce about his stoppage losses to Zhang and at the weigh in, he wore a mask depicting the face of Zhang.

In a back and forth contest, Joyce was dropped in the ninth round, en-route to a unanimous decision loss. The scorecards read 96–94, 96–94 and 97–92. Most of the action was back and forth for most the rounds. Joyce took a couple of the earlier rounds. Both landed big shots at the end of round 5. In rounds 7 and 8, Joyce backed up Chisora multiple times and right hands. On one occasion, rocking Chisora. Until round 9, where Chisora landed his knockdown punch. In round 10, Chisora continued to land hard shots which again rocked Joyce. By the end of the fight, both boxers had bruising under their eyes. CompuBox stats showed Joyce was slightly busier in landing 211 of 835 punches thrown, a connect rate of 25.3%, while Chisora landed 192 of his 564 punches thrown. Chisora was more busier to the body landing 44 shots compared to the 11 landed by Joyce.

==== Chisora vs. Wallin ====
On 17 October 2024, Jarrell Miller (26–1–2. 22 KOs) told BoxingScene.com that he would fight Chisora at an arena in Manchester on February 8, 2025. He said, "That's the biggest one we're talking about right now – Chisora. It's not locked in yet; the deal's not signed yet. But there are definitely talks. In November, it was reported that Chisora would face Miller in Manchester, England on 8 February 2025. It was later announced that the fight against Miller fell through. Miller posted via his Instagram account it was Salita Promotions who caused the fight to fall apart after saying Chisora was ready to finalise. According to Miller, his contract with Salita Promotions had expired but said they exercised their first and last right of refusal. Salita later replied stating it was Miller who eventually turned down the fight.

On 27 November 2024, Chisora was announced to fight 34 year old Swedish heavyweight Otto Wallin at Co-op Live in Manchester. Wallin, who was also promoted by Salita, was given the opportunity after Miller was dropped. The pair went face-to-face at a press conference the next day. The fight was billed was 'The Last Dance', hinting Chisora's retirement. Chisora had recently said he wanted to have 50 professional fights. The fight with Wallin would be his 49th in the pro ranks. Wallin said he was there to win, "I'm here to fight and here to win and that's all. I don't worry so much about The Last Dance and all that, this is my time. You're gonna get stopped." Chisora responded, "There's nothing you've got that I haven't tasted in my life. I don't believe you've got the power to bother me. Even the biggest punchers have not bothered me, so, you know, don't worry, I've got fear of you but it gives me that motivation to train harder. I'm definitely going to come for you." Lead promoter Frank Warren said the winner would be locked in to a big fight later in the year. Wallin received a call from his manager Jolene Mizzone, the day after his birthday, to offer him the fight. He called in a belated birthday gift. The fight was scheduled for 10 rounds. During the final press conference, Chisora said, "I'm buzzing for this fight. It's going to be one exciting fight, I can tell you that now. Do not sit down because we're going to drown this guy. We're going to go hard. I know for a fact he hasn't trained the way I expect him to train for me, so I'm excited. I just want to fight." Chisora explained he was told to retire from boxing after 50 fights. Had he not been told, he could have 'gone to 100'. The press conference was billed as Chisora's final in the UK. Chisora weighed in at 259.7 pounds, 20 pounds heavier than Wallin, who came in at 239.1 pounds. During the face-off, Chisora jokingly put Wallin in a headlock and security had to break it up.

Upon entering the arena, videos surfaced on social media of Chisora very emotional and in tears. In front of 13,000 in attendance, Chisora defeated Wallin by unanimous decision, scoring a knockdown in the 9th and 12th rounds in the IBF title eliminator contest. In the opening round, Chisora fought on the inside attacking Wallin's body. It was more of the same in the next round until Wallin landed several left uppercuts on Chisora. He gained Wallin's attention in round 4 following a number of overhand rights. By round 5, Wallin was holding on. An accidental head clash caused a nasty cut between the right eye and eyebrow of Chisora. Referee John Latham sent Chisora to the ringside doctor to be examined a few times for the remainder of the fight, but was allowed to finish the fight. Chisora tired himself out in round 8, when he threw a 30-punch combination, however not all clean punches and not all landed, but Wallin was hurt from this. The first knockdown occurred in round 9 when Chisora landed a right hand. Wallin stumbled back a few stops and lost his footing, ending up staggering backwards across the ring, onto the canvas. Another right hand to the head dropped Wallin again to close the final round. The scores read 117–109, 114–112 and 116–110 for Chisora. Many felt the fight was not close. Fans took to social media to call out judge Bence Kovac of Hungary, for his 114–112 card. Had Chisora not scored the two knockdowns, his card would have been scored a draw, still giving Chisora an overall majority decision win.

After the fight, Chisora asked the fans to stay in the arena, as he had prepared to ask them the question of who he should fight next. He had members of his team hold up three posters, one each of Usyk, Joshua and Dubois. The former two of which got the loudest crowd reactions. He said, "You tell me, I think I've earned number 50. A big blockbuster, please. So you tell me." Chisora told the reporter his ears popped in round 3.

==== Chisora vs. Wilder ====
Chisora spoke to the media after the Wallin fight and appeared to do a U-turn on the fight being his last in the UK. He stated he may have his final professional bout in London. When asked if he would continue if he was to win his 50th, he replied, "No". In recent interviews, Promoter Frank Warren revealed that Chisora could land a world title shot in his final fight. On 24 September, Chisora announced that his 50th professional fight was set for 13 December 2025 at the Co-op Live in Manchester, in conjunction with a Queensberry Promotions event. Chisora highlighted the importance of the occasion on Instagram, urging fans to make their accommodation arrangements. He stated, "So book your hotels, book your restaurants, me and Queensberry are coming to shut it down in Manchester." Chisora mentioned that he had a particular opponent in mind. However, he stated that circumstances shifted due to decisions made by higher authorities within the boxing hierarchy. The card was to be headlined by Moses Itauma. According to Warren, a fight between Chisora and Itauma was explored. Chinese boxer Zhilei Zhang threw his name into the hat, telling Chisora, “I want to fight you," he said. "I want to bang you. Maybe you want to bang me, too.” On 19 October, 37 year old Miller emerged as the frontrunner to fight Chisora. Miller was scheduled to fight Chisora earlier in the year, before being pulled from the card due to promotional issues. Miller was now promotional free.

Chisora made an appearance at The O2 Arena on 25 October, during the Parker-Wardley event, alongside other heavyweight contenders. It was revealed that Chisora's next opponent was likely to be Dillian Whyte, in a trilogy fight. Chisora was willing to fight if the contract terms were favorable. Miller was reportedly rejected by Chisora from the shortlist of potential opponents, which included Zhang. Warren stated, "Chisora against Whyte is done and dusted. We’ve got a couple of bits to sort out but I’ll sort them out." He also stated the fight would headline the event, with Itauma's fight being pushed back to 2026. Whyte was eager and recognized the importance of the fight given his age and career trajectory. He acknowledged Chisora as a challenging opponent. While there is mutual respect, there was also some personal tension, with Whyte describing Chisora as a bully. On 1 November, Dan Rafael reported that the fight was cancelled, and Chisora would no longer be competing on 13 December. There was speculation that Chisora might have suffered an injury, but this was not confirmed. Chisora stated that the fight contract did not meet his expectations, leading him to tear it up.

On 22 January 2026, it was announced that Chisora would fight Deontay Wilder in London in April. On 30 January 2026, it was confirmed the bout would take place at The O2 Arena on 4 April 2026. It was the 50th professional fight of both fighters' careers. During fight week, Chisora was made a 1/2 favourite by Sky Bet and Wilder was a 13/8 underdog. Chisora arrived to the fight week press conference in a tank with Reform UK leader Nigel Farage. On the night of the fight, Wilder dominated the early rounds and Chisora rallied late. Wilder won the fight by split decision. Two judges scored it for Wilder 115–111 and 115–113, while the third judge scored it for Chisora 115–112.

== Public image ==
=== Political views ===
Chisora endorsed the Brexit Party at the 2019 European Parliament elections. In July 2022, Chisora showed his support to outgoing Prime Minister Boris Johnson by wearing a mask of Johnson's face during his weigh-in for his rematch against Kubrat Pulev, saying, "I was a big fan of Boris Johnson. I'm a big Brexit fan, I love that Brexit".

Chisora is also a supporter of Nigel Farage and Reform UK.

=== Controversies ===
In November 2010, Chisora was found guilty of assaulting his then-girlfriend after finding text messages from another man on her phone. He narrowly escaped being sent to prison, and was given a 12-week sentence suspended for two years. He was ordered to pay £1,500 in compensation and £500 costs and complete 150 hours community work. The court was told that the fighter also had previous convictions for public order offences, assaulting a police officer and possession of an offensive weapon.

In November 2015, Chisora was stopped in his Bentley near Hyde Park in London. In September 2016, it was reported that Chisora was driving without a valid driving licence, insurance and MOT certificate. After initially being given six points, which would mean a six-month driving ban, Chisora since appealed the ban blaming his insurance broker. A date of 10 October 2016 was set for the hearing. At a court hearing in January 2017, Chisora avoided a driving ban by claiming he thought he was insured after a payment had left his account, paying for two drivers.

== Personal life ==
Chisora is married and has two daughters.

Alongside English, Chisora is fluent in Shona, his first language.

Chisora is a fan of Manchester United F.C.

Chisora is a Christian.

== Professional boxing record ==
50 fights	36 wins	14 losses
By knockout	23	4
By decision	13	10

No.	Result	Record	Opponent	Type	Round, time	Date	Location	Notes
50	Loss	36–14	Deontay Wilder	SD	12	4 Apr 2026	The O2 Arena, London, England	
49	Win	36–13	Otto Wallin	UD	12	8 Feb 2025	Co-op Live, Manchester, England	
48	Win	35–13	Joe Joyce	UD	10	27 Jul 2024	The O2 Arena, London, England	
47	Win	34–13	Gerald Washington	UD	10	12 Aug 2023	The O2 Arena, London, England	
46	Loss	33–13	Tyson Fury	TKO	10 (12), 2:51	3 Dec 2022	Tottenham Hotspur Stadium, London, England	For WBC heavyweight title
45	Win	33–12	Kubrat Pulev	SD	12	9 Jul 2022	The O2 Arena, London, England	Won vacant WBA International heavyweight title
44	Loss	32–12	Joseph Parker	UD	12	18 Dec 2021	AO Arena, Manchester, England	For WBO Inter-Continental heavyweight title
43	Loss	32–11	Joseph Parker	SD	12	1 May 2021	AO Arena, Manchester, England	For vacant WBO Inter-Continental heavyweight title
42	Loss	32–10	Oleksandr Usyk	UD	12	31 Oct 2020	The SSE Arena, London, England	Lost WBO Inter-Continental heavyweight title
41	Win	32–9	David Price	TKO	4 (12), 2:00	26 Oct 2019	The O2 Arena, London, England	Won vacant WBO Inter-Continental heavyweight title
40	Win	31–9	Artur Szpilka	KO	2 (10), 1:01	20 Jul 2019	The O2 Arena, London, England	
39	Win	30–9	Senad Gashi	UD	10	20 Apr 2019	The O2 Arena, London, England	
38	Loss	29–9	Dillian Whyte	KO	11 (12), 1:56	22 Dec 2018	The O2 Arena, London, England	For WBC Silver and WBO International heavyweight titles
37	Win	29–8	Carlos Takam	TKO	8 (12), 1:01	28 Jul 2018	The O2 Arena, London, England	Won vacant WBA International heavyweight title
36	Win	28–8	Zakaria Azzouzi	TKO	2 (8), 2:12	24 Mar 2018	The O2 Arena, London, England	
35	Loss	27–8	Agit Kabayel	MD	12	4 Nov 2017	Casino de Salle Medcin, Monte Carlo, Monaco	For European heavyweight title
34	Win	27–7	Robert Filipovic	TKO	5 (6), 1:20	30 Sep 2017	Echo Arena, Liverpool, England	
33	Loss	26–7	Dillian Whyte	SD	12	10 Dec 2016	Manchester Arena, Manchester, England	For WBC International heavyweight title
32	Win	26–6	Drazan Janjanin	KO	2 (8), 1:09	10 Sep 2016	Hovet, Stockholm, Sweden	
31	Loss	25–6	Kubrat Pulev	SD	12	7 May 2016	Barclaycard Arena, Hamburg, Germany	For vacant European heavyweight title
30	Win	25–5	Andras Csomor	TKO	2 (8), 2:08	9 Jan 2016	Baden-Arena, Offenburg, Germany	
29	Win	24–5	Jakov Gospic	TKO	3 (8), 2:23	12 Dec 2015	The O2 Arena, London, England	
28	Win	23–5	Peter Erdos	TKO	5 (8), 1:01	5 Dec 2015	Inselparkhalle, Hamburg, Germany	
27	Win	22–5	Marcelo Nascimento	PTS	10	26 Sep 2015	The SSE Arena, London, England	
26	Win	21–5	Beka Lobjanidze	KO	1 (10), 0:29	24 Jul 2015	The SSE Arena, London, England	
25	Loss	20–5	Tyson Fury	RTD	10 (12), 3:00	29 Nov 2014	ExCeL, London, England	Lost European and WBO International heavyweight titles; For vacant British heavyweight title
24	Win	20–4	Kevin Johnson	UD	12	15 Feb 2014	Copper Box Arena, London, England	Retained WBA and WBO International heavyweight titles
23	Win	19–4	Ondřej Pála	TKO	3 (12), 2:25	30 Nov 2013	Copper Box Arena, London, England	Retained WBO International heavyweight title; Won vacant WBA International heavyweight title
22	Win	18–4	Edmund Gerber	TKO	5 (12), 2:50	21 Sep 2013	Copper Box Arena, London, England	Won vacant European heavyweight title
21	Win	17–4	Malik Scott	TKO	6 (10), 2:56	20 Jul 2013	Wembley Arena, London, England	Won vacant WBO International heavyweight title
20	Win	16–4	Héctor Alfredo Ávila	TKO	9 (10), 2:49	20 Apr 2013	Wembley Arena, London, England	
19	Loss	15–4	David Haye	TKO	5 (10), 2:59	14 Jul 2012	Boleyn Ground, London, England	For vacant WBA Inter-Continental and WBO International heavyweight titles
18	Loss	15–3	Vitali Klitschko	UD	12	18 Feb 2012	Olympiahalle, Munich, Germany	For WBC heavyweight title
17	Loss	15–2	Robert Helenius	SD	12	3 Dec 2011	Hartwall Arena, Helsinki, Finland	For WBA Inter-Continental, WBO Inter-Continental, and vacant European heavyweight titles
16	Win	15–1	Remigijus Ziausys	PTS	6	11 Nov 2011	North Bridge Leisure Centre, Halifax, England	
15	Loss	14–1	Tyson Fury	UD	12	23 Jul 2011	Wembley Arena, London, England	Lost British and Commonwealth heavyweight titles
14	Win	14–0	Sam Sexton	TKO	9 (12), 2:53	18 Sep 2010	LG Arena, Birmingham, England	Retained British heavyweight title; Won Commonwealth heavyweight title
13	Win	13–0	Danny Williams	TKO	2 (12), 1:41	15 May 2010	Boleyn Ground, London, England	Won British heavyweight title
12	Win	12–0	Carl Baker	TKO	2 (10), 2:13	13 Feb 2010	Wembley Arena, London, England	
11	Win	11–0	Zurab Noniashvili	TKO	3 (8), 2:20	9 Oct 2009	York Hall, London, England	
10	Win	10–0	Paul Butlin	PTS	8	22 May 2009	York Hall, London, England	
9	Win	9–0	Daniil Peretyatko	PTS	8	30 Jan 2009	York Hall, London, England	
8	Win	8–0	Neil Simpson	RTD	2 (8), 3:00	6 Dec 2008	ExCeL, London, England	
7	Win	7–0	Lee Swaby	TKO	3 (8), 2:45	26 Sep 2008	York Hall, London, England	
6	Win	6–0	Shawn McLean	TKO	6 (8)	12 Sep 2008	Grosvenor House, London, England	
5	Win	5–0	Sam Sexton	TKO	6 (6), 2:34	14 Jun 2008	York Hall, London, England	
4	Win	4–0	Paul Butlin	PTS	4	12 Jan 2008	York Hall, London, England	
3	Win	3–0	Darren Morgan	PTS	4	13 Oct 2007	York Hall, London, England	
2	Win	2–0	Tony Booth	PTS	4	7 Apr 2007	Millennium Stadium, Cardiff, Wales	
1	Win	1–0	István Kecskés	TKO	2 (4), 1:21	17 Feb 2007	Wembley Arena, London, England	

== Viewership ==
=== International ===
Date	Fight	Network	Country	Viewers	Source(s)
23 July 2011	Derek Chisora vs. Tyson Fury	Channel 5	United Kingdom	2,900,000	
3 December 2011	Robert Helenius vs. Derek Chisora	Das Erste	Germany	3,160,000	
18 February 2012	Vitali Klitschko vs. Derek Chisora	RTL	Germany	12,880,000	
18 February 2012	Vitali Klitschko vs. Derek Chisora	Inter	Ukraine	20,200,000	
18 February 2012	Vitali Klitschko vs. Derek Chisora	Sport1	Hungary	400,000	
18 February 2012	Vitali Klitschko vs. Derek Chisora	Polsat	Poland	3,309,000	
18 February 2012	Vitali Klitschko vs. Derek Chisora	Polsat Sport	Poland	525,000	
18 February 2012	Vitali Klitschko vs. Derek Chisora	Polsat Sport Extra	Poland	208,000	
7 May 2016	Kubrat Pulev vs. Derek Chisora	Sat.1	Germany	1,930,000	
Total viewership				45,512,000	

=== Pay-per-view bouts ===
No.	Date	Fight	Country	Network	Buys	Source(s)
1	3 December 2011	Robert Helenius vs. Derek Chisora	Finland	MTV Katsomo	20,000	
2	14 July 2012	David Haye vs. Derek Chisora	United Kingdom	BoxNation	300,000	
3	22 December 2018	Dillian Whyte vs. Derek Chisora II	United Kingdom, Ireland	Sky Box Office	532,000	
4	31 October 2020	Oleksandr Usyk vs. Derek Chisora	United Kingdom, Ireland	Sky Box Office	1,059,000	
4	31 October 2020	Oleksandr Usyk vs. Derek Chisora	Ukraine	MEGOGO	100,000	
5	1 May 2021	Derek Chisora vs. Joseph Parker	United Kingdom, Ireland	Sky Box Office	145,000	
6	3 December 2022	Tyson Fury vs. Derek Chisora III	United Kingdom, Ireland	BT Sport Box Office	500,000	
7	4 April 2026	Derek Chisora vs. Deontay Wilder	Worldwide	DAZN PPV		
Total sales					2,656,000	

== Filmography ==
Year	Title	Role	Notes
2018	Pitbull: Last Dog	Boxer 2	

== See also ==
- List of European Boxing Union heavyweight champions
- List of Commonwealth Boxing Council champions
- List of British heavyweight boxing champions
- List of ABA super-heavyweight champions

Sporting positions
Amateur boxing titles
Previous: David Price	ABA super-heavyweight champion 2006	Next: David Price
Regional boxing titles
Preceded by Danny Williams	British heavyweight champion 15 May 2010 – 23 July 2011	Succeeded by Tyson Fury
Preceded by Sam Sexton	Commonwealth heavyweight champion 18 September 2010 – 23 July 2011	Succeeded by Tyson Fury
Vacant Title last held by David Haye	WBO International heavyweight champion 20 July 2013 – 29 November 2014	Succeeded by Tyson Fury
Vacant Title last held by Kubrat Pulev	European heavyweight champion 21 September 2013 – 29 November 2014	Succeeded by Tyson Fury
Vacant Title last held by Sonny Bill Williams	WBA International heavyweight champion 30 November 2013 – November 2014; Vacated	Vacant Title next held by Alexander Petkovic
Vacant Title last held by Johann Duhaupas	WBA International heavyweight champion 28 July 2018 – November 2018; Vacated	Vacant Title next held by Michael Hunter
Vacant Title last held by Tyson Fury	WBO Inter-Continental heavyweight champion 26 October 2019 – 31 October 2020	Succeeded by Oleksandr Usyk
Vacant Title last held by Zhan Kossobutskiy	WBA International heavyweight champion 9 July 2022 – December 2022; Vacated	Vacant Title next held by Justis Huni
Awards
Previous: Krzysztof Głowacki vs. Marco Huck; Round 6	ESPN Round of the Year vs. Dillian Whyte; Round 5; 2016	Next: Anthony Joshua vs. Wladimir Klitschko; Round 5
