= Derek Chisora vs. Tyson Fury =

Boxing match

The Big Brawl to Settle it All
- Date: 23 July 2011
- Venue: Wembley Arena, Wembley, London, UK
- Title(s) on the line: British and Commonwealth heavyweight titles

Tale of the tape
Boxer	Derek Chisora	Tyson Fury
Nickname	Del Boy	The Gypsy King
Hometown	London, England	Manchester, England
Pre-fight record	14–0 (9 KOs)	14–0 (10 KOs)
Age	27 years, 6 months	22 years, 11 months
Height	6 ft 2 in (188 cm)	6 ft 9 in (206 cm)
Weight	261 lb (118 kg)	256 lb (116 kg)
Style	Orthodox	Orthodox
Recognition	WBO; No. 12 Ranked Heavyweight; British and Commonwealth heavyweight champion	WBC; No. 34 Ranked Heavyweight; English heavyweight champion

Result
- Fury wins via 12–round unanimous decision (117–112, 117–112, 118–111)

Derek Chisora vs. Tyson Fury, billed as The Big Brawl to Settle It All, was a professional boxing match contested between British and Commonwealth heavyweight champion, Derek Chisora, and English heavyweight champion, Tyson Fury, that took place on 23 July 2011 at Wembley Arena, with Fury winning by unanimous decision.

== Background ==
After stopping Sam Sexton to add the British title to the Commonwealth belt he had won against Danny Williams, Derek Chisora was set to face unified IBF, WBO, IBO, Lineal and Ring magazine heavyweight champion, Wladimir Klitschko on 11 December 2010, at the SAP Arena, in Mannheim, but Klitschko pulled out of the fight three days prior, after suffering a torn abdominal muscle. The fight was postponed and later rearranged for 30 April 2011, with Klitschko once again pulling out of the fight due to not being fully recovered from his injury, and the bout was ultimately cancelled so Klitschko could fight a unification match against WBA heavyweight champion David Haye on 2 July.

On 11 February 2011, the British Boxing Board of Control installed undefeated prospect Tyson Fury as mandatory challenger for the British title. In April 2011, Fury's promotional company, Hennessy Sports, won the purse bid to stage the contest. It was announced on 23 May that Chisora face Fury on 23 July 23 at Wembley Arena, the bookies had Chisora as a slight favourite.

== Fight details ==
In the second round Fury was sent staggering from a left hook but otherwise was able to outbox the champion.

At the end of 12 rounds two judges scored the fight 117-112 with the other scoring it 118-111, giving Fury a unanimous decision victory.

== Aftermath ==
Despite Wladimir Klitschko openly discussing the prospect of facing the winner during the build-up, either would immediately move to world level. Fury would make one defence of the Commonwealth belt against Neven Pajkić before vacating both belts when David Price was installed as his mandatory. Chisora would set his sights on European success, and in December would face Robert Helenius for the European title.

Promoter Mick Hennessy said the fight peaked at around 3 million viewers on Channel 5.

The two would face each other in a November 2014 rematch which was also a WBO "eliminator" bout.

== Fight card ==
Confirmed bouts:

Weight Class		vs.		Method	Round	Time	Notes
Heavyweight	Tyson Fury	def.	Derek Chisora (c)	UD	12/12		^{Note 1}
Light-welterweight	Ashley Theophane (c)	def.	Jason Cook	KO	10/12	0:43	^{Note 2}
Light-middleweight	Ryan Toms (c)	def.	Pat McAleese	TKO	4/10	2:44	^{Note 3}
Light-middleweight	Peter Vaughan	def.	Phill Fury	PTS	8/8
Bantamweight	Kid Galahad	def.	Pavels Senkovs	PTS	6/6
Light-welterweight	Boris Georgiev	def.	Tamao Dwyer	TKO	4/6	1:47
Light-welterweight	Phil Gill	vs.	Mo Khaled	PTS	6/6
Welterweight	Chris Evangelou	def.	John Baguley	PTS	4/4
Middleweight	Lee Markham	def.	Dorian Darch	PTS	4/4		^{Note 4}

^Note 1 For British and Commonwealth heavyweight titles
^Note 2 For British light-welterweight title
^Note 3 For Southern Area light-middleweight title
^Note 4 Professional debut for Markham

== Broadcasting ==
Country	Broadcasters	
Country	Free-to-air	Cable/Pay TV
United Kingdom	Channel 5	—N/a
Canada	—N/a	Super Channel
United States	—N/a	Integrated Sports PPV

Preceded by vs. Sam Sexton	Derek Chisora' bouts 23 July 2011	Succeeded by vs. Remigijus Ziausys
Preceded by vs. Marcelo Luiz Nascimento	Tyson Fury's bouts 23 July 2011	Succeeded by vs. Nicolai Firtha
