= Derek Chisora vs. Kubrat Pulev II =

2022 Boxing match

Total Carnage
- Date: 9 July 2022
- Venue: The O2 Arena, Greenwich, London, UK
- Title(s) on the line: vacant WBA International heavyweight title

Tale of the tape
| Boxer | Derek Chisora | Kubrat Pulev |
| Nickname | War | The Cobra |
| Hometown | Finchley, London, UK | Sofia, Sofia City Province, Bulgaria |
| Pre-fight record | 31–12 (23 KO) | 29–2 (14 KO) |
| Age | 38 years, 6 months | 41 years, 2 months |
| Height | 6 ft 2 in (188 cm) | 6 ft 4 1/2 in (194 cm) |
| Weight | 258 1/4 lb (117 kg) | 250 lb (113 kg) |
| Style | Orthodox | Orthodox |
| Recognition | WBC; No. 18 Ranked Heavyweight | WBC; No. 17 Ranked Heavyweight |

Result
- Chisora wins via 12–round split decision (112–116, 116–112, 116–114)

Derek Chisora vs. Kubrat Pulev II, billed as Total Carnage, was a professional boxing match contested between Derek Chisora, and Kubrat Pulev, with the vacant WBA International heavyweight title on the line. The bout took place on 9 July 2022 at The O2 Arena, with Chisora winning by split decision.

== Background ==
Chisora and Pulev first fought in 2016, for the vacant European title at the Barclaycard Arena. Pulev won by a controversial split decision with scores of 116–112, 118–110 in his favour, and 115–113 in favour of Chisora.

Chisora participated in the match following three successive defeats against Oleksandr Usyk and Joseph Parker on two occasions. Pulev regained composure following a loss against Joshua in 2020, scoring a technical knockout over Frank Mir in a crossover match in 2021, and securing a unanimous decision victory over Jerry Forrest in May.

Following unsuccessful negotiations with Adam Kownacki, it was announced on 7 June 2022 that Chisora would rematch Pulev on 9 July at The O2 Arena in London. The bout was scheduled to be held on DAZN.

In the build-up, Chisora and Pulev were separated at the final press conference following a heated face-off. Chisora showed his support to outgoing Prime Minister Boris Johnson by wearing a mask of Johnson's face during the weigh-in.

== Fight details ==
From the opening bell, Chisora employed a pressure-oriented strategy, advancing with pronounced head movement to evade Pulev's jab and reduce the distance. Pulev aimed to establish control from range, but Chisora's persistent forward movement disrupted his rhythm. In the second round, Chisora landed multiple hooks to the body, prompting Pulev to initiate clinches. Referee Marcus McDonnell issued early warnings for excessive holding, consistent with patterns observed in their previous encounter. In round three, Chisora connected with a looping right hand that drove Pulev onto the ropes. Pulev responded with straight punches and a firm jab, though he struggled to maintain distance as Chisora continued to press inside. In the middle rounds, Pulev began to find success with short uppercuts and compact combinations during close-range exchanges. Chisora maintained his focus on body shots, frequently throwing in bursts while in the clinch. In round five, Pulev sustained a cut above his left eye following a right hand from Chisora. The sixth round saw Pulev land a clean left hook that briefly halted Chisora's momentum, though Chisora responded with an overhand right that drew audible reaction from the crowd. Round seven featured sustained exchanges, with both fighters trading hooks and engaging in repeated clinches. Chisora's work rate remained high, although signs of fatigue began to emerge. Pulev capitalised with well-timed counters, including a sharp one-two combination in round eight that visibly affected Chisora. In the later rounds, both fighters demonstrated urgency. In round nine, Chisora landed a left hook that appeared to stagger Pulev. The Bulgarian responded with straight right hands and jabs in an effort to reassert control. Pulev sustained a second cut, this time above his right eye, during round ten, which was characterised by continuous exchanges at close range. In round eleven, Chisora landed another right hand that forced Pulev to retreat. The twelfth and final round saw both boxers engage in sustained exchanges at the centre of the ring. Chisora's consistent output and forward pressure appeared to edge the final moments. Chisora won by a split decision with scores of 116–112, 116–114 in his favour, and 116–112 in favour of Pulev. Compubox showed that Pulev landed 155 of his 511 punches thrown (30%) and Chisora landed 93 of his 335 thrown (28%). Chisora and Pulev equalled on power punches, both landing 133.

== Aftermath ==
Following Chisora's win, in the post-fight interview, Chisora said "It was hard. You know, Pulev is a great fighter. Very difficult, very hard." and "I'm happy today, at the same time I'm sad. You know, I don't have many left in me, but what I have, I'm going to give it all to you guys". Chisora also expressed interest in a match with Deontay Wilder.

Chisora, received a second title shot at the world championship, facing Tyson Fury in December, and Pulev, defeated Manuel Charr on 7 December 2024, by unanimous decision to capture the WBA (Regular) title.

== Fight card ==
Confirmed bouts:

| Weight Class | | vs. | | Method | Round | Time | Notes |
|---|---|---|---|---|---|---|---|
| Heavyweight | Derek Chisora | def. | Kubrat Pulev | SD | 12 | | ^{Note 1} |
| Light-middleweight | Israil Madrimov | vs. | Michel Soro | TD | 3/12 | 0:05 |
| Super-bantamweight | Ramla Ali | def. | Agustina Marisa Belen Rojas | PTS | 8 |
| Light-middleweight | Caoimhín Agyarko | def. | Lukasz Maciec | UD | 10 | | ^{Note 2} |
| Heavyweight | Fabio Wardley | def. | Chris Healey | TKO | 2/8 | 0:40 |
Preliminary bouts
| Heavyweight | Solomon Dacres | def. | Kevin Nicolas Espindola | PTS | 8 |
| Super-bantamweight | Yousuf Ibrahim | def. | Francisco Rodriguez | PTS | 4 |

^Note 1 For vacant WBA International heavyweight title
^Note 2 For vacant WBA International light-middleweight title

== Broadcasting ==
| Country | Broadcaster |
| Country | Stream |
|---|---|
| Worldwide | DAZN |

| Preceded by vs. Joseph Parker | Derek Chisora's bouts 9 July 2022 | Succeeded by vs. Tyson Fury |
| Preceded by vs. Jerry Forrest | Kubrat Pulev's bouts 9 July 2022 | Succeeded by vs. Andrzej Wawrzyk |
