= Dillian Whyte vs. Óscar Rivas =

Boxing match

- Date: 20 July 2019
- Venue: The O2 Arena, Greenwich, London, UK
- Title(s) on the line: WBC interim heavyweight title

Tale of the tape
Boxer	Dillian Whyte	Óscar Rivas
Nickname	The Body Snatcher	Kaboom
Hometown	Brixton, London, UK	Buenaventura, Valle del Cauca, Colombia
Pre-fight record	25–1 (18 KO)	26–0 (18 KO)
Age	31 years, 8 months	31 years, 8 months
Height	6 ft 4 in (193 cm)	6 ft 0 in (183 cm)
Weight	254 lb (115 kg)	239.4 lb (109 kg)
Style	Orthodox	Orthodox
Recognition	WBC; No. 1 Ranked Heavyweight; WBA/WBO; No. 3 Ranked Heavyweight; The Ring; No. 4 Ranked Heavyweight; TBRB; No. 5 Ranked Heavyweight	WBO; No. 5 Ranked Heavyweight; WBA/IBF; No. 7 Ranked Heavyweight; WBC; No. 14 Ranked Heavyweight

Result
- Whyte wins via 12-round unanimous decision

Dillian Whyte vs. Óscar Rivas was a professional boxing match contested between Dillian Whyte and Óscar Rivas for the vacant WBC interim heavyweight title. The event took place on 20 July 2019 at The O2 Arena in London. After the fight, it was reported that Dillian Whyte tested positive for a substance banned by UK-Anti Doping (UKAD) during training for the fight. However, UKAD released a statement in December 2019, fully exonerating Whyte of any wrong-doing.

== Background ==
Following his eleventh-round knockout victory over Derek Chisora, Whyte called out unified heavyweight champion Anthony Joshua. Joshua, who was unusually booed by many of those present at The O2 Arena, said: “If Deontay Wilder is serious and he is going to fight Tyson Fury and doesn’t want to become undisputed champion, Dillian, you will get a title shot." On 12 January 2019, Whyte revealed that he had turned down a "severe lowball" offer from Joshua to fight him in a rematch. Whyte did not reveal the figure, however, he claimed it was lower than what he received against Chisora in December 2018.

Whyte claimed the Joshua fight "was dead" and he was to look at other options, including a potential fight with Dominic Breazeale for the interim WBC belt but Breazeale challenged Deontay Wilder for the world title.

NABF, IBF International, and WBO-NABO champion Rivas, had enhanced his reputation as a danger man following his brutal knockout of the former world title challenger Bryant Jennings in January.

== Fight details ==
Whyte survived a ninth-round knockdown to take a unanimous decision victory, with two of the judge's scorecards showing 115–112, and the third 116–111.

== Aftermath ==
Three days after the bout it was revealed that Whyte tested positive for a substance that is banned by UK-Anti Doping (UKAD) during the pre-fight training, but also gave negative results on all tests administered by the Voluntary Anti Doping Association. His promoter Eddie Hearn urged fans to "wait for the facts" before judging the fighter. In the same month, upon hearing the news of the adverse findings, the WBC provisionally suspended Whyte's interim champion status and removed him from their rankings pending an investigation. On 6 December 2019, UKAD released a statement fully exonerating Whyte of any wrong-doing, stating; "UK Anti-Doping and the professional boxer, Dillian Whyte, can today jointly confirm that Mr Whyte was charged with an anti-doping rule violation (ADRV) earlier this year, but that this charge has now been withdrawn. The charge was brought after a sample provided by Mr Whyte on 20 June 2019 indicated the presence of two metabolites of a steroid. UKAD initiated an investigation with which Mr Whyte cooperated fully. UKAD has accepted the explanation provided by Mr Whyte and, in accordance with the UK Anti-Doping Rules, the charge against Mr Whyte has been withdrawn."

== Fight card ==
Confirmed bouts:

Weight Class		vs.		Method	Round	Time	Notes
Heavyweight	Dillian Whyte	def.	Oscar Rivas	UD	12/12		^{Note 1}
Heavyweight	David Price	def.	David Allen	RTD	10/12	3:00	^{Note 2}
Heavyweight	Derek Chisora	def.	Artur Szpilka	KO	2/10	1:01
Cruiserweight	Richard Riakporhe (c)	def.	Chris Billam-Smith	SD	10/10		^{Note 3}
Light-welterweight	Dalton Smith	def.	Ibrar Riyaz	RTD	2/4	3:00
Cruiserweight	Lawrence Okolie (c)	def.	Mariano Angel Gudino	TKO	7/10	2:59	^{Note 4}
Light-heavyweight	Dan Azeez	def.	Charlie Duffield	TKO	6/10	2:49	^{Note 5}
Preliminary bouts
Heavyweight	Fabio Wardley	def.	Mariano Ruben Diaz Strunz	TKO	6/8	1:06
Heavyweight	Alen Babić	def.	Morgan Dessaux	KO	1/4	0:56

^Note 1 For vacant WBC interim heavyweight title
^Note 2 For vacant WBA Continental heavyweight title
^Note 3 For WBA Inter-Continental cruiserweight title
^Note 4 For WBA Continental cruiserweight title
^Note 5 For vacant Southern Area light-heavyweight title

== Broadcasting ==
Country	Broadcaster	
Country	PPV	Stream
United Kingdom	Sky Sports Box Office	—N/a
Unsold markets	—N/a	DAZN

Preceded by vs. Derek Chisora II	Dillian Whyte' bouts 20 July 2019	Succeeded by vs. Mariusz Wach
Preceded by vs. Bryant Jennings	Óscar Rivas's bouts 20 July 2019	Succeeded by vs. Sylvera Louis
