= Dillian Whyte vs. Derek Chisora II =

Boxing match

The Brawl To Settle It All
- Date: 22 December 2018
- Venue: The O2 Arena, Greenwich, London, UK
- Title(s) on the line: WBC Silver and WBO International heavyweight titles

Tale of the tape
| Boxer | Dillian Whyte | Derek Chisora |
| Nickname | "The Body Snatcher" | "War" |
| Hometown | Brixton, London, UK | Finchley, London, UK |
| Pre-fight record | 24–1 (17 KOs) | 29–8 (21 KOs) |
| Age | 30 years, 8 months | 34 years, 11 months |
| Height | 6 ft 4 in (193 cm) | 6 ft 2 in (188 cm) |
| Weight | 246 1/2 lb (112 kg) | 246 1/4 lb (112 kg) |
| Style | Orthodox | Orthodox |
| Recognition | WBC/WBO; No. 1 Ranked Heavyweight; WBA/TBRB; No. 4 Ranked Heavyweight; The Ring; No. 5 Ranked Heavyweight; WBC Silver and WBO International heavyweight champion | IBF; No. 4 Ranked Heavyweight; WBA; No. 5 Ranked Heavyweight; WBC; No. 7 Ranked Heavyweight; WBO; No. 11 Ranked Heavyweight; TBRB; No. 8 Ranked Heavyweight |

Result
- Whyte wins via 11th-round KO

Dillian Whyte vs. Derek Chisora II, billed as The Brawl To Settle It All, was a professional boxing match contested between WBC Silver and WBO International heavyweight champion, Dillian Whyte, and Derek Chisora. The bout took place on 22 December 2018 at The O2 Arena, with Whyte winning by knockout in the eleventh round.

== Background ==
Whyte and Chisora first fought in 2016, with Whyte defending his WBC International title at Manchester Arena on the undercard of the Anthony Joshua vs. Éric Molina heavyweight title fight. The fight was a WBC "eliminator", held at the time by Deontay Wilder. Whyte won by a controversial split decision with scores of 115–113, 115–114 in his favour, and 115–114 in favour of Chisora.

On 24 March 2018, at The O2 Arena, Whyte defeated former heavyweight champion Lucas Browne via 6th-round KO. On the undercard, Chisora defeated Zakaria Azzouzi, winning by stoppage in the second round. On 28 July 2018, at The O2 Arena, Whyte defeated former heavyweight champion Joseph Parker, winning by unanimous decision. In the chief support, Chisora defeated former world title challenger Carlos Takam via 8th-round TKO, setting up a potential rematch between the two later in the year.

In mid October 2018, Whyte and fellow heavyweight contender Luis Ortiz appeared to have a war of words and called each other out, with Ortiz stating he would come to the UK and fight Whyte on 22 December, a potential PPV date allocated to the possible Whyte vs. Chisora rematch. After hearing this, Chisora came out saying 'No one wants to see that [Whyte-Ortiz]', that he was 'the Money Man' and Whyte should fight him if he wants to earn more money. Hearn also stated despite Ortiz putting his name forward, Chisora was the front-runner to fight Whyte. On 22 October, Whyte told Sky Sports that Chisora needed to sign a deal quick or he would look at other options. On 1 November 2018, the rematch between Whyte and Chisora was announced to take place on 22 December at The O2 Arena on Sky Sports Box Office.

== Fight details ==
From the opening bell, Whyte and Chisora both started fast, exchanging punches early, with Chisora closing the distance and applying constant pressure, with Whyte counter punching on the back foot. As the rounds progressed, Chisora outworked Whyte with his offence, landing hooks to body and head, as Whyte worked behind the jab, boxing at range. In the middle rounds, Chisora continued setting the pace, leading with hooks and landing combinations, with Whyte responding with clean straight shots from the outside, and trading power punches on the inside. In the eighth, referee Marcus McDonnell deducted a point off Chisora for a low blow. In the later rounds, Whyte and Chisora began to fight up close, with both men exchanging a series of punches aggressively. In the eleventh, referee Marcus McDonnell deducted a second point off Chisora for use of the elbow. Later in the round, Whyte connected with a devastating left hook, which knocked out Chisora. The referee reached the count of ten, giving Whyte the win by KO in the eleventh round. At the time of stoppage, two judges had Chisora ahead 95–94 and one judge had Whyte ahead 95–94.

== Aftermath ==
Following Whyte's win, in the post-fight interview, Whyte challenged unified heavyweight champion Anthony Joshua who was in attendance at ringside to a rematch next in 2019. Joshua replied stating that if an undisputed title fight against Deontay Wilder did not materialise, then he would defend his world titles against Whyte, who then stormed off mid-discussion.

== Fight card ==
Confirmed bouts:

| Weight Class | | vs. | | Method | Round | Time | Notes |
|---|---|---|---|---|---|---|---|
| Heavyweight | Dillian Whyte (c) | def. | Derek Chisora | KO | 11/12 | 1:56 | ^{Note 1} |
| Light-heavyweight | Joshua Buatsi (c) | def. | Renold Quinlan | TKO | 1/10 | 1:50 | ^{Note 1} |
| Flyweight | Charlie Edwards | def. | Cristofer Rosales (c) | UD | 12/12 | | ^{Note 3} |
| Heavyweight | Carlos Takam | def. | Senad Gashi | TKO | 7/10 | 1:40 |
| Heavyweight | David Price | def. | Tom Little | TKO | 4/8 | 2:38 |
| Featherweight | Ryan Walsh (c) | def. | Reece Bellotti | SD | 12/12 | | ^{Note 4} |
| Middleweight | Linus Udofia | def. | Pavol Garaj | PTS | 6/6 |
| Heavyweight | Fabio Wardley | def. | Phil Williams | TKO | 3/4 | 1:58 |

^Note 1 For WBC Silver and WBO International heavyweight titles
^Note 2 For WBA International light-heavyweight title
^Note 3 For WBC flyweight title
^Note 4 For British featherweight title

== Broadcasting ==
| Country | Broadcaster | | |
| Country | Cable/pay television | PPV | Stream |
|---|---|---|---|
| United Kingdom | —N/a | Sky Sports Box Office | —N/a |
| New Zealand | Sky Arena | —N/a | —N/a |
| Panamá | Cable Onda Sports | —N/a | —N/a |
| United States | Showtime | —N/a | —N/a |
| Unsold markets | —N/a | —N/a | DAZN |

| Preceded by vs. Joseph Parker | Dillian Whyte's bouts 22 December 2018 | Succeeded by vs. Óscar Rivas |
| Preceded by vs. Carlos Takam | Derek Chisora's bouts 22 December 2018 | Succeeded by vs. Senad Gashi |
