= Derek Chisora vs. Tyson Fury II =

Boxing match

Bad Blood
- Date: 29 November 2014
- Venue: ExCeL London, London, England
- Title(s) on the line: European, WBO International and vacant British heavyweight titles

Tale of the tape
Boxer	Derek Chisora	Tyson Fury
Nickname	Del Boy	The Gypsy King
Hometown	London, England	Manchester, England
Pre-fight record	20–4 (13 KOs)	22–0 (16 KOs)
Age	30 years, 11 months	26 years, 3 months
Height	6 ft 2 in (188 cm)	6 ft 9 in (206 cm)
Weight	241 1/2 lb (110 kg)	264 lb (120 kg)
Style	Orthodox	Orthodox
Recognition	WBO; No. 1 Ranked Heavyweight; IBF; No. 3 Ranked Heavyweight; WBC; No. 7 Ranked Heavyweight; TBRB; No. 8 Ranked Heavyweight; European and WBO International heavyweight champion	WBO; No. 4 Ranked Heavyweight; IBF; No. 5 Ranked Heavyweight; WBC; No. 11 Ranked Heavyweight; TBRB; No. 3 Ranked Heavyweight

Result
- Fury wins via 10th-round RTD

Derek Chisora vs. Tyson Fury II, billed as The Fight for the Right and Bad Blood, was a professional boxing match contested between European and WBO International heavyweight champion, Derek Chisora, and Tyson Fury, with the vacant British heavyweight title also on the line. The fight was a WBO "eliminator", with the winner becoming the mandatory challenger for the WBO heavyweight title, held at the time by Wladimir Klitschko. The bout took place on 29 November 2014 at the ExCel, with Fury winning by corner retirement in the tenth round.

== Background ==
Chisora and Fury first fought in 2011, with Chisora defending his British and Commonwealth titles at Wembley Arena, both men went into the fight with a record of 14–0. Fury won by unanimous decision with scores of 117–112, 117–112, and 118–111.

On 8 January 2014, it was announced that Chisora and Fury would fight in interim bouts on 15 February 2014, at the Copper Box Arena, setting up a potential rematch between the two in the summer. Following both their original opponents Andriy Rudenko and Gonzalo Omar Basile pulling out, Chisora and Fury were scheduled to face replacement opponents Kevin Johnson and Joey Abell. Chisora defeated Johnson, winning by unanimous decision, and Fury defeated Abell via 4th-round TKO.

Chisora and Fury were due to meet for a second time on 26 July 2014, at the Manchester Arena. On 21 July, Chisora was forced to pull out after sustaining a fractured hand in training. Chisora's sparring partner, Alexander Ustinov was lined up as Chisora's replacement. Fury pulled out of the fight after his uncle and former trainer Hughie Fury was taken seriously ill. Fury and Chisora rescheduled the rematch for 29 November 2014 at ExCeL.

== Fight details ==
From the opening bell, Chisora struggled with Fury's height, reach and movement. Unable to apply pressure and close the range, failing to land any significant punches, and due to Fury's unorthodox fighting style, ended up hitting him below the belt. Chisora was warned twice by referee Marcus McDonnell in the first round. In the second, Fury switched from orthodox and boxed out of a southpaw stance for the majority of the fight, momentarily reverting to his traditional right-handed stance as the rounds progressed. Fury used his jab and fast punches to outbox Chisora, keeping on the outside, creating a distance with his longer reach, winning the rounds clearly until trainer Don Charles had seen enough and pulled Chisora out at the end of the tenth round.

== Aftermath ==
Following Fury's win, in the post-fight interview, Fury said "Wladimir Klitschko, I'm coming for you, baby. I'm coming. No turning back now, no retreat, no surrender." Fury's uncle and trainer Peter Fury also confirmed Fury would fight once more before challenging Klitschko for the world title. Christian Hammer was later announced as Fury's opponent and the fight took place on 28 February 2015 at the O2 Arena. Fury won the fight via 8th round RTD. After the fight, Fury called out Klitschko again, stating he was ready for his world title shot next.

Fury defeated Klitschko on 28 November, by unanimous decision to capture the unified WBA (Super), IBF, WBO, IBO and The Ring titles. Fury's upset victory ended Klitschko's reign of nearly 10 years, the second longest in heavyweight history.

== Fight card ==
Confirmed bouts:

Weight Class		vs.		Method	Round	Time	Notes
Cruiserweight	Steve Collins Jr	def.	Mareks Kovalevskis	PTS	4/4
Main Card
Heavyweight	Tyson Fury	def.	Derek Chisora (c)	RTD	10/12	3:00	^{Note 1}
Middleweight	Billy Joe Saunders (c)	def.	Chris Eubank Jr.	SD	12/12		^{Note 2}
Welterweight	Frankie Gavin (c)	def.	Bradley Skeete	UD	12/12		^{Note 3}
Super-featherweight	Mitchell Smith	def.	Zoltan Kovacs	UD	10/10		^{Note 4}
Super-middleweight	Frank Buglioni	def.	Andrew Robinson	UD	10/10		^{Note 5}
Super-featherweight	Liam Walsh (c)	def.	Gary Sykes (c)	UD	12/12		^{Note 6}
Preliminary bouts
Super-bantamweight	Lewis Pettitt (c)	def.	Santiago Allione	UD	10/10		^{Note 7}
Welterweight	Macaulay McGowan	def.	Fonz Alexander	PTS	4/4
Super-featherweight	Romeo Romaeo	def.	Ismail Anwar	PTS	6/6
Welterweight	Ahmet Patterson	def.	Sullivan Mason	PTS	8/8
Heavyweight	Eddie Chambers	def.	Dorian Darch	TKO	3/8	2:20
Light-middleweight	Georgie Kean	def.	Kevin McCauley	PTS	4/4

^Note 1 For European, WBO International and vacant British heavyweight titles
^Note 2 For British, Commonwealth, and European middleweight titles
^Note 3 For vacant WBO European super-featherweight title
^Note 4 For British and vacant Commonwealth welterweight titles
^Note 5 For vacant WBO European super-middleweight title
^Note 6 For British and Commonwealth super-featherweight titles
^Note 7 For WBA Inter-Continental super-bantamweight title

== Broadcasting ==
Country	Broadcaster
Country	Cable/Pay TV
United Kingdom	BoxNation
United States	ESPN

Preceded by vs. Kevin Johnson	Derek Chisora's bouts 29 November 2014	Succeeded by vs. Beka Lobjanidze
Preceded by vs. Joey Abell	Tyson Fury's bouts 29 November 2014	Succeeded by vs. Christian Hammer
