= Kell Brook vs. Michael Jennings =

Boxing match

The Magnificent Seven
- Date: 18 September 2010
- Venue: LG Arena, Solihull, West Midlands
- Title(s) on the line: British and WBO Inter-Continental welterweight titles

Tale of the tape
| Boxer | Kell Brook | Michael Jennings |
| Nickname | "Special K" | "The Lurcher" |
| Hometown | Sheffield, South Yorkshire | Chorley, Lancashire |
| Pre-fight record | 21–0 (14 KOs) | 36–2 (17 KOs) |
| Age | 24 years, 4 months | 33 years |
| Height | 5 ft 9 in (175 cm) | 5 ft 9 1/2 in (177 cm) |
| Weight | 146 1/2 lb (66 kg) | 146 1/2 lb (66 kg) |
| Style | Orthodox | Orthodox |
| Recognition | WBO; No. 1 Ranked Welterweight; British and WBO Inter-Continental welterweight champion | WBO; No. 9 Ranked Welterweight |

Result
- Brook wins via 5th-round TKO

Kell Brook vs Michael Jennings, billed as The Magnificent Seven, was a professional boxing match contested between British and WBO Inter-Continental welterweight champion, Kell Brook, and former world title challenger, Michael Jennings. The fight was a WBO "eliminator", with the winner becoming the mandatory challenger for the WBO welterweight title, held at the time by Manny Pacquiao. The bout took place on 18 September 2010 at the LG Arena, with Brook winning by technical knockout in the fifth round.

== Background ==
Following Brook's third British title defence, winning the Lonsdale Belt outright against Michael Lomax, he challenged Jennings, stating "I believe I am the best in the country, but I can't say that for sure until I've beaten Jennings". Jennings, who had challenged Miguel Cotto for the WBO welterweight title earlier in the year, had previously expressed interest in a fight with Brook.

Brook and Jennings were due to meet on 30 October 2009, at the Echo Arena. On 26 October, Brook was forced to pull out due to illness. Laszlo Komjathi was lined up as Brook's replacement. Jennings defeated Komjathi, winning by points decision. Jennings was forced to postpone the match with Brook after sustaining a hand injury in the fight. Brook and Jennings rescheduled the match for 3 July 2010 at Preston Guild Hall. On 26 May, Brook was forced to pull out a second time after sustaining a rib injury in training. John O'Donnell was lined up as Brook's replacement, with the vacant British title on the line. On 15 June, O'Donnell was forced to pull out after sustaining a rib injury in training. Brook and Jennings once again rescheduled the match for 18 September 2010 at the LG Arena on Sky Sports Box Office.

== Fight details ==
In the opening two rounds, Brook led with straight jabs and landed with scoring shots on the front foot, with Jennings on the back foot, boxing at range. In the third, both Brook and Jennings applied pressure up close and wrestled in the clinches. In the fourth, Brook began working behind the jab once again, with Jennings feinting, looking to land punches as the round progressed. Early in the fifth, Brook went on the offensive, sending Jennings back against the neutral corner with a flurry of punches that opened a cut on the corner of his right eye. The referee, immediately called a timeout and took Jennings to his corner, where he determined that the damage to Jennings eye was too serious and stopped the fight, therefore giving Brook the win by TKO in the fifth round.

== Aftermath ==
Despite Brook being unsatisfied with the win, and Jennings expressing interest in a rematch, a second bout would not materialise. Brook defeated Shawn Porter in 2014, by majority decision to capture the IBF title, and Jennings retired from the sport of boxing, due to recurring injuries.

== Fight card ==
Confirmed bouts:

| Weight Class | | vs | | Method | Round | Time | Notes |
|---|---|---|---|---|---|---|---|
| Middleweight | Matthew Macklin | def. | Shalva Jomardashvili | RTD | 5/12 | 3:00 | ^{Note 1} |
| Cruiserweight | Alexander Frenkel | def. | Enzo Maccarinelli (c) | KO | 7/12 | 2:30 | ^{Note 2} |
| Heavyweight | Derek Chisora (c) | def. | Sam Sexton (c) | TKO | 9/12 | 2:53 | ^{Note 3} |
| Welterweight | Kell Brook (c) | def. | Michael Jennings | TKO | 5/12 | 0:47 | ^{Note 4} |
| Light-heavyweight | Nathan Cleverly | def. | Karo Murat | RTD | 9/12 | 3:00 | ^{Note 5} |
| Light-middleweight | Lukas Konecny | def. | Matthew Hall | TKO | 6/12 | 1:53 | ^{Note 6} |
| Super-middleweight | James DeGale (c) | def. | Carl Dilks | TKO | 1/10 | 2:54 | ^{Note 7} |
| Light-welterweight | Frankie Gavin | def. | Michael Kelly | TKO | 5/10 | 2:59 | ^{Note 8} |
| Bantamweight | Najah Ali | def. | Don Broadhurst | PTS | 10/10 | | ^{Note 9} |
Preliminary bouts
| Welterweight | Ronnie Heffron | def. | Billy Smith | PTS | 4/4 |
| Light-middleweight | Joe Selkirk | def. | Janis Cernauskis | TKO | 4/4 | 2:17 |
Unfought floater bouts
| Super-featherweight | Craig Evans | vs | Mickey Coveney | N/a | 4 |

^Note 1 For British and WBO Inter-Continental welterweight titles
^Note 2 Final eliminator for WBO light-heavyweight title
^Note 3 For European cruiserweight title
^Note 4 For British and Commonwealth heavyweight titles
^Note 5 For European light-middleweight title
^Note 6 For European middleweight title
^Note 7 For WBA International super-middleweight title
^Note 8 For Irish light-welterweight title
^Note 9 For International Masters bantamweight title

== Broadcasting ==
| Country | Broadcaster |
|---|---|
| United Kingdom | Sky Sports Box Office |
| Germany | ARD |
| Hungary | Sport1 |

| Preceded by vs Krzysztof Bienias | Kell Brook's bouts 18 September 2010 | Succeeded by vs Philip Kotey |
| Preceded by vs Laszlo Komjathi | Michael Jennings's bouts 18 September 2010 | Retired |
