= Sam Sexton =

British boxer

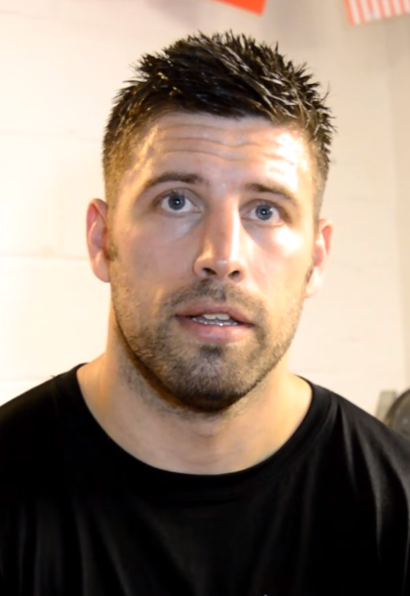
- Sexton in 2015

Personal information
- Born: 18 July 1984 (age 42) Norwich, Norfolk, England
- Height: 6 ft 2 in (188 cm)
- Weight: Heavyweight

Boxing career
- Reach: 71 in (180 cm)
- Stance: Orthodox

Boxing record
- Total fights: 28
- Wins: 24
- Win by KO: 9
- Losses: 4
Medal record
Men's amateur boxing
Representing England
Norway Box Cup
Bronze medal – third place	2004 Oslo	Heavyweight

Sam Sexton (born 18 July 1984) is a British former professional boxer who competed from 2005 to 2018. At regional level, he held the Commonwealth heavyweight title from 2009 to 2010; the British heavyweight title from 2017 to 2018; and won the Prizefighter series in 2008.

== Amateur career ==
Sexton competed in the 2004 Norway Box Cup, losing by stoppage to eventual gold medalist, Vyacheslav Glazkov, in the semifinals.

== Professional career ==
=== Early career ===
Sexton started his professional career in September 2005, in his home town of Norwich when he defeated Paul Bonson over six rounds at Carrow Road. He ended up compiling a record of 7-0 before he was defeated by former ABA champion Derek Chisora at the York Hall. The referee stopped the fight with 26 seconds to go in the last round. A distraught Sexton said after the fight "Maybe the occasion got to me. I really don't know. I'll go back watch the fight probably have a week off. I'll be back straight. I just didn't feel myself, but I'm not one to make excuses. I boxed, I lost, that's just the way it is".

=== Prizefighter champion ===
On 12 September 2008, Sexton competed in the "Prizefighter" competition in Newcastle upon Tyne. He defeated Pelé Reid in the quarter-final and Luke Simpkin in the semi-final, both by unanimous decision. Sexton then defeated Chris Burton in the final, the only boxer with an unbeaten professional record, the fight was stopped 2:10 into the third and final round. Talking of his pride at winning the tournament and picking up the £25,000 top prize, Sexton said: "Winning this is by far my top moment in boxing. I've represented England and that was fantastic boxing for my country but this is something completely different...I don't think I'm far off a British title shot now and I will see what I get offered. Hopefully I will be boxing for the British title as soon as possible."

Following the tournament Sexton returned to the ring in November in order to challenge for his first professional title belt, the Southern Area Championship. In the opposing corner, Colin Kenna was stopped in the 6th round to give Sexton his first professional belt.

=== Commonwealth champion ===
==== Sexton vs. Rogan ====
Sexton fought Martin Rogan for his first defence of the Commonwealth heavyweight title, at the Odyssey, Belfast on 15 May 2009. Sexton defeated Rogan, handing him his first professional loss, after the doctor ruled that Rogan was unfit to continue in the 8th round due to a closed eye.

==== Sexton vs. Rogan II ====
On 6 November at the same venue, he stopped Rogan in a rematch to retain his title. Rogan's corner threw in the towel before the start of the 7th round, handing Sexton the win. Rogan cited a neck injury preventing him using his left arm when interviewed afterwards, as the reason for being pulled out by his corner.

==== Sexton vs. Chisora II ====
On 13 February 2010, Sexton was due to fight Danny Williams for the British title at Wembley Arena but had to pull out with a hand injury. The fight was rearranged for May but Sexton pulled out after his mother suffered a brain aneurysm and was replaced by Derek Chisora. Sexton fought for the British title on 18 September, matched up against Derek Chisora. Sexton was stopped in the 9th round losing the second defence of his title.

=== Second British title challenge ===
==== Sexton vs. Price ====
On 19 May 2012, at Aintree Racecourse in Liverpool, Sexton was defeated by David Price by a fourth-round KO, in a fight for the vacant British and Commonwealth heavyweight titles. The fight was ordered by the BBBofC on 9 February after Tyson Fury vacated in order to step up. Price controlled the bout with his jab and distance, hurting Sexton badly whenever he connected. In the fourth round Price knocked Sexton out cold.

=== British champion ===
==== Sexton vs. Cornish ====
On 6 October 2017, Sexton defeated Gary Cornish by unanimous decision and won the vacant British title at the Meadowbank Sports Centre, Edinburgh.

==== Sexton vs. Fury ====
On 14 February 2018, Hennessy Sports along with Infinitum announced that Sexton would make his first defence of the British heavyweight title at Macron Stadium's Premier Suite in Bolton on 12 May against Hughie Fury, live and exclusive on Channel 5. The bout would mark the first time in nearly seven years that the British title would be contested for on terrestrial TV. Speaking of the fight, Mick Hennessy said, "I'm delighted to bring the historic British Heavyweight Championship back to mainstream, free-to-air, television on Channel 5 where it will be seen by the biggest viewing audience possible due to their considerable reach and exposure. I can't believe that it will be nearly seven years since the British Heavyweight title was last seen on free-to-air in the UK on Channel 5." Fury started the fight moving around the ring throwing jabs and right hands. The movement looked to frustrate Sexton in round 3. Fury knocked Sexton down twice in the fight in dropping him in rounds 4 and 5. Fury won the British title defeating Sexton via TKO in round 5; Referee Terry O'Connor stopped the fight after Fury knocked Sexton down with a right hand in round 5. Sexton got back to his feet, but the referee stopped it anyway. The fight peaked at 2.9 million viewers.

=== Retirement ===
Sexton retired from boxing in December 2019.

== Professional boxing record ==
28 fights	24 wins	4 losses
By knockout	9	4
By decision	15	0

No.	Result	Record	Opponent	Type	Round, time	Date	Location	Notes
28	Loss	24–4	Hughie Fury	TKO	5 (12), 2:03	12 May 2018	Whites Hotel, Bolton, England	Lost British heavyweight title
27	Win	24–3	Gary Cornish	UD	12	6 Oct 2017	Meadowbank Sports Centre, Edinburgh, Scotland	Won vacant British heavyweight title
26	Win	23–3	Hari Miles	TKO	2 (6), 0:19	15 Jul 2016	The Halls, Norwich, England	
25	Win	22–3	Peter Erdos	TKO	4 (6), 0:47	4 Mar 2016	The Halls, Norwich, England	
24	Win	21–3	Tomas Mrazek	PTS	6	20 Nov 2015	The Halls, Norwich, England	
23	Win	20–3	Kamil Sokolowski	PTS	6	18 Sep 2015	The Halls, Norwich, England	
22	Win	19–3	Larry Olubamiwo	PTS	6	8 Mar 2014	Epic Centre, Norwich, England	
21	Win	18–3	Jiri Svacina	PTS	6	15 Jun 2013	Epic Centre, Norwich, England	
20	Win	17–3	Tomas Mrazek	PTS	6	22 Mar 2013	Epic Centre, Norwich, England	
19	Win	16–3	Tayar Mehmed	TKO	2, 1:10	10 Nov 2012	Norwich Showground, Norwich, England	
18	Loss	15–3	David Price	KO	4 (12), 2:07	19 May 2012	Aintree Racecourse, Liverpool, England	For vacant British and Commonwealth heavyweight titles
17	Win	15–2	Larry Olubamiwo	TD	5 (8)	13 Jan 2012	York Hall, London, England	Points TD after Sexton cut from an accidental head clash
16	Win	14–2	Remigijus Ziausys	PTS	6	14 Oct 2011	Millennium Hotel, London, England	
15	Loss	13–2	Derek Chisora	TKO	9 (12), 2:53	18 Sep 2010	LG Arena, Birmingham, England	Lost Commonwealth heavyweight title; For British heavyweight title
14	Win	13–1	Martin Rogan	RTD	6 (12), 3:00	6 Nov 2009	Odyssey Arena, Belfast, Northern Ireland	Retained Commonwealth heavyweight title
13	Win	12–1	Martin Rogan	TKO	8 (12), 2:37	15 May 2009	Odyssey Arena, Belfast, Northern Ireland	Won Commonwealth heavyweight title
12	Win	11–1	Colin Kenna	TKO	6 (10), 1:16	21 Nov 2008	York Hall, London, England	Won vacant Southern Area heavyweight title
11	Win	10–1	Chris Burton	TKO	3 (3), 2:10	12 Sep 2008	Metro Radio Arena, Newcastle, England	Prizefighter: The Heavyweights II - Final
10	Win	9–1	Luke Simpkin	UD	3	12 Sep 2008	Metro Radio Arena, Newcastle, England	Prizefighter: The Heavyweights II - Semi-final
9	Win	8–1	Pelé Reid	UD	3	12 Sep 2008	Metro Radio Arena, Newcastle, England	Prizefighter: The Heavyweights II - Quarter-final
8	Loss	7–1	Derek Chisora	TKO	6 (6), 2:34	14 Jun 2008	York Hall, London, England	
7	Win	7–0	Darren Morgan	PTS	6	12 Jan 2008	York Hall, London, England	
6	Win	6–0	Luke Simpkin	TKO	5 (6)	13 Oct 2007	York Hall, London, England	
5	Win	5–0	Paul King	PTS	6	16 Mar 2007	Norwich Showground, Norwich, England	
4	Win	4–0	Lee Mountford	TKO	2 (6)	15 Oct 2006	Mercy XS, Norwich, England	
3	Win	3–0	István Kecskés	PTS	4	12 May 2006	York Hall, London, England	
2	Win	2–0	Jason Callum	PTS	6	11 Dec 2005	Lava Ignite, Norwich, England	
1	Win	1–0	Paul Bonson	PTS	6	3 Sep 2005	Carrow Road, Norwich, England	

== Viewership ==
=== United Kingdom ===
Date	Fight	Network	Country	Viewers	Source(s)
12 May 2018	Sam Sexton vs. Hughie Fury	Channel 5	United Kingdom	2,900,000	
Total viewership				2,900,000	

Sporting positions
Regional boxing titles
Vacant Title last held by Micky Steeds	Southern Area heavyweight champion 21 November 2008 – May 2009; Vacated	Vacant Title next held by Larry Olubamiwo
Preceded by Martin Rogan	Commonwealth heavyweight champion 15 May 2009 – 18 September 2010	Succeeded by Derek Chisora
Vacant Title last held by Dillian Whyte	British heavyweight champion 6 October 2017 – 12 May 2018	Succeeded by Hughie Fury
Tournament boxing titles
Previous: Martin Rogan	Prizefighter 2: heavyweight tournament champion 12 September 2008	Next: Audley Harrison
