= Anthony Joshua vs. Éric Molina =

Boxing competition

Anthony Joshua vs Éric Molina
- Date: 10 December 2016
- Venue: Manchester Arena, Manchester, England
- Title on the line: IBF Heavyweight Championship

Tale of the tape
Boxer	Anthony Joshua	Éric Molina
Nickname	AJ	Drummer Boy
Hometown	London, England	Raymondville, Texas, U.S.
Purse	£5,000,000	
Pre-fight record	17–0 (17 KOs)	25–3 (19 KOs)
Age	27 years, 1 month	34 years, 7 months
Height	6 ft 6 in (198 cm)	6 ft 4 in (193 cm)
Weight	243 lb (110 kg)	237 lb (108 kg)
Style	Orthodox	Orthodox
Recognition	IBF; Heavyweight Champion; The Ring/TBRB; No. 5 Ranked Heavyweight	IBF; No. 7 Ranked Heavyweight

Result
- Joshua wins via third-round technical knockout

Anthony Joshua vs. Éric Molina, was a professional boxing match contested on 10 December 2016, for the IBF heavyweight championship. The bout took place at the Manchester Arena, with Joshua winning by technical knockout in the third round.

== Background ==
Following Joshua's win over Dominic Breazeale on 25 June, a seventh-round technical knockout (TKO) to retain his IBF heavyweight title, the IBF ordered Joshua to fight undefeated mandatory challenger, Joseph Parker, by 9 January 2017. Following unified heavyweight champion Tyson Fury's withdrawal from a scheduled rematch with Wladimir Klitschko, Hearn revealed on Twitter in late September that he had contacted team Klitschko for a potential fight. On 16 October it was reported that a deal with Klitschko was almost finalised, with the WBA and WBO titles potentially being on the line after Fury vacated the titles days earlier. A week later, it was reported that Klitschko had sustained an injury in training, scuttling plans of a potential fight. After Joseph Parker had agreed to fight Andy Ruiz Jr for the vacant WBO title, relinquishing his IBF mandatory position, the three names in the mix for Joshua's opponent were Éric Molina, David Price and Bryant Jennings. In November, it was officially announced that Joshua would make the second defence of his title against the IBF's number 7 ranked contender and former world title challenger, Éric Molina, with the fight to be televised live on Sky Sports Box Office in the UK and Showtime in the US, on 10 December at the Manchester Arena.

== Fight details ==
The opener saw little action, with the highlight being a left hook from Joshua in the final seconds of a round which the champion comfortably won on the scorecards. The second round saw much of the same; Molina cautiously backing up as Joshua stalked the American around the ring, with the highlight again coming from the champion–a left uppercut that momentarily stunned Molina. Joshua began the third round with more intensity, throwing combination punches as Molina continued to remain on the back foot. At the halfway point, Joshua landed a powerful straight right hand to drop Molina to the canvas. The challenger beat the referee's count of ten, only for Joshua to pounce on the American with a flurry of punches culminating in a left hook to force the referee to call a halt to the fight.

== Aftermath ==
Following Joshua's win, promoter Eddie Hearn brought Wladimir Klitschko into the ring to announce Klitschko as Joshua's next opponent, with the fight scheduled for 29 April 2017 at Wembley Stadium in London.

== Fight card ==
Confirmed bouts:

Weight Class		vs.		Method	Round	Time	Notes
Heavyweight	Anthony Joshua (c)	def.	Éric Molina	TKO	3/12	2:02	^{Note 1}
Heavyweight	Dillian Whyte (c)	def.	Derek Chisora	SD	12		^{Note 2}
Lightweight	Katie Taylor	def.	Viviane Obenauf	PTS	6
Featherweight	Scott Quigg	def.	Jose Cayetano	TKO	9/12	1:23	^{Note 3}
Super-flyweight	Khalid Yafai	def.	Luis Concepción	UD	12		^{Note 4}
Super-middleweight	Callum Smith (c)	def.	Luke Blackledge	TKO	10/12	2:34	^{Note 5}
Light-heavyweight	Frank Buglioni	def.	Hosea Burton (c)	TKO	12/12	1:56	^{Note 6}
Heavyweight	Luis Ortiz	def.	David Allen	TKO	7/8	2:59
Welterweight	Conor Benn	def.	Steven Blackhouse	TKO	1/4	1:06
Preliminary bouts
Middleweight	Marcus Morrison	def.	Harry Matthews	PTS	6

^Note 1 For IBF heavyweight title
^Note 2 For WBC International heavyweight title
^Note 3 For vacant WBA International featherweight title
^Note 4 For vacant WBA super-flyweight title
^Note 5 For British super-middleweight title
^Note 6 For British light-heavyweight title

== Broadcasting ==
Country	Broadcaster
United Kingdom	Sky Sports Box Office
United States	Showtime

Preceded by vs. Dominic Breazeale	Anthony Joshua's bouts 10 December 2016	Succeeded by vs. Wladimir Klitschko
Preceded by vs. Tomasz Adamek	Éric Molina's bouts 10 December 2016	Succeeded by vs. Jamal Woods
