= Dave Parris =

British boxer and referee (born 1945)

Personal information
- Nationality: (United Kingdom) British
- Born: Dave Parris; 1 March 1945 (age 81) England
- Weight: Heavyweight

Boxing career
- Stance: Conventional

Boxing record
- Total fights: 61
- Wins: 24
- Win by KO: 4
- Losses: 30
- Draws: 7
- No contests: 0

Dave Parris (born 1 March 1945) is a former British heavyweight boxer, who is now a referee and judge, based in Woodlesford, Leeds.
