= Corner retirement =

Type of fight ending in boxing

A corner retirement, also known as a corner stoppage, is a term in boxing used to describe a fight ending when a boxer refuses to continue or their corner team pulls them out during the rest period between rounds. This results in the referee stopping the fight, and it is officially recorded as "RTD" (Retired) in boxing records. In contrast, a technical knockout (TKO) may only be declared by the referee or ringside doctor, at any stage of the fight including rest periods. In either case, an RTD still counts as a type of knockout, and is displayed as a stoppage result on a boxer's win/loss record. One of the most famous RTD (corner retirement) stoppages in boxing history occurred on February 25, 1964, during Sonny Liston vs. Cassius Clay. After six competitive rounds, Sonny Liston, complaining of a shoulder injury, refused to get up from his stool for the seventh round. As a result, Clay was declared the winner by RTD and became the world heavyweight champion.

Alternatively, the corner may intervene by "throw(ing) in the towel", meaning a fighter’s corner concedes defeat by literally tossing a towel (or sponge) into the ring, signaling to the referee that their boxer cannot safely continue if they are taking too much punishment or is clearly unable to defend themselves, to prevent serious injury or long-term damage, or when a fighter is outclassed and continuing would only worsen the loss. This action directly indicates a clear, visible gesture of surrender in which the referee must immediately stop the fight, awarding victory to the opponent. This action can be traced back to the late 19th century when trainers began using towels or sponges to signal surrender. In general, current day terminology the phrase evolved into a common idiom meaning to "give up" or "quit". In MMA, throwing in the towel is far less common than in boxing, and in some promotions (like the UFC) it is not officially recognized as a valid way to stop a fight. Instead, the referee or ringside doctor must step in to halt the bout. A corner can signal surrender, but tossing a towel into the cage does not automatically end the fight unless the referee acknowledges it as official stoppages come from the referee, doctor, or fighter themselves (via tap or verbal submission). Corner stoppages are allowed, but they must verbally notify the referee rather than rely on a towel. MMA corners usually shout or signal directly to the referee while throwing a towel as it might not easily reach the referee’s line of sight.
