= CompuBox =

Computerized punches scoring system

CompuBox is a computerized punch-tracking system widely used in professional boxing to provide statistical analysis of matches. Established in 1985, it has become an integral tool for broadcasters and analysts, offering viewers quantitative data on a boxer's performance.

== History ==
The origins of CompuBox trace back to the early 1980s when Jon Gibbs developed TenniSTAT, a computer-generated statistics program for tennis utilized by major tournaments such as the US Open and Wimbledon. In 1984–85, while collaborating with Logan Hobson and Robert Canobbio at Sports Information Data Base (SIDB) in Hasbrouck Heights, New Jersey, Gibbs adapted his technology to boxing, resulting in the creation of FightStat (also known as PunchStat).

This system debuted during the 1985 HBO Boxing telecast of the rematch between Ray Mancini and Livingstone Bramble for the WBA world lightweight title at Madison Square Garden's Felt Forum and in Reno. Following SIDB's bankruptcy in 1985, Hobson and Canobbio rebranded the program as CompuBox and established CompuBox Inc. Hobson departed the company in 2002.

== Methodology ==
CompuBox operates with two ringside operators, each assigned to monitor one fighter. Using a laptop, they input data by pressing one of four keys corresponding to jab connect, jab miss, power punch connect, and power punch miss. This data is compiled in real-time to calculate punch counts and hit percentages throughout the match. The system does not evaluate punch effectiveness or damage but strictly records the number of punches thrown and landed.

== Usage ==
CompuBox has been widely used by major sports networks, including HBO, NBC, and ESPN, to enhance boxing telecasts by providing viewers with statistical insights into fights. Former world champion Genaro Hernández was among those trained to operate the system. The system is also referenced during post-fight analyses and has played a role in debates over controversial fight decisions.

== Criticisms ==
While CompuBox provides real-time data, it has faced criticism regarding its accuracy and influence on public perception. Critics argue that:

- The system does not account for punch effectiveness, impact, or defensive maneuvers.
- Human operators must make split-second judgments, which can introduce errors.
- Fighters who throw many ineffective punches may appear more dominant than those landing fewer, but more effective, punches.

Some analysts caution against relying solely on CompuBox data to judge fights, as it was designed to complement, not replace, official scoring criteria.

== Technological developments ==
Over the years, CompuBox has evolved from early manual entry systems to more streamlined software. The company has explored potential enhancements, such as integrating sensors in gloves to measure punch force and speed, though these have not yet been fully implemented in professional boxing broadcasts.

== See also ==
- Boxing scoring
