= Mandatory challenger =

Opponent who the reigning champion must fight or lose their title

In professional boxing and some other combat sports, a mandatory challenger is an opponent whom a champion must either fight (in a mandatory defence) or be forced to vacate their title as champion. The opposite of a mandatory defence is a voluntary defence, against an opponent who might offer greater revenue potential than a mandatory challenger.

Mandatory challengers are designated by the champion's sanctioning body; in boxing, the major sanctioning bodies are the WBA, WBC, IBF and WBO. The sanctioning bodies often order eliminators between top-ranked contenders to decide who will receive the mandatory challenger status. If the champion vacates the belt, the mandatory challenger is paired against another challenger for the vacant belt. Due to boxing politics, the champion of one sanctioning body is excluded from the rankings of rival sanctioning bodies, so unification fights cannot be mandatory defences. Conversely, mandatory challengers may be forced to wait for a title shot if the champion pursues a unification bout with a champion of a different sanctioning body, as a unification fight supersedes a mandatory defence.

== See also ==
- Interim championship
