= Vitali Klitschko vs. Derek Chisora =

Boxing competition

Showdown in Munich
- Date: 18 February 2012
- Venue: Olympiahalle, Munich, Germany
- Title(s) on the line: WBC heavyweight title

Tale of the tape
Boxer	Vitali Klitschko	Derek Chisora
Nickname	Dr. Ironfist	Del Boy
Hometown	Kyiv, Kyiv Oblast, Ukraine	Finchley, London, UK
Pre-fight record	43–2 (40 KOs)	15–2 (9 KOs)
Age	40 years, 6 months	28 years, 1 month
Height	6 ft 7 in (201 cm)	6 ft 2 in (188 cm)
Weight	243 1/2 lb (110 kg)	241 1/4 lb (109 kg)
Style	Orthodox	Orthodox
Recognition	WBC; Heavyweight Champion; The Ring; No. 1 Ranked Heavyweight	WBC; No. 15 Ranked Heavyweight

Result
- Klitschko wins via 12–round unanimous decision (118–110, 118–110, 119–111)

Vitali Klitschko vs. Derek Chisora, billed as Showdown in Munich, was a professional boxing match that was contested between WBC heavyweight champion, Vitali Klitschko, and the WBC's number 15 ranked contender, Derek Chisora. The bout took place on 18 February 2012 at the Olympiahalle, with Klitschko winning by unanimous decision.

== Background ==
After regaining the WBC title by stopping Samuel Peter after a four-year absence from the ring in 2008 Vitali Klitschko was looking to make an eighth consecutive defence of his crown.

Derek Chisora had been set to face Vitali's brother Wladimir, on 11 December 2010, but Klitschko pulled out just days prior with a torn abdominal muscle. The rescheduled fight for 30 April 2011 was also cancelled so [Wladimir] Klitschko could fight David Haye on 2 July. With [Vitali] Klitschko due to fight Adamek, this left Chisora with no other option than to face his mandatory challenger for the British title, the upcoming Tyson Fury. Chisora's 14-0 win streak ended at the hands of the undefeated Fury, who won via twelve round unanimous decision. Chisora then challenged for the vacant European heavyweight title against Finland's Robert Helenius in Helsinki. The fight ended in a split decision victory for Helenius, which many observers felt was a robbery and that Chisora had won the fight.

Sources in Germany reported that Kltschko and Chisora were likely to fight on 18 February 2012 at the Olympiahalle in Munich. This was later confirmed on 12 December 2011 that Chisora would be Klitschko's next opponent.

Chisora was heavily criticised for his behaviour at the weigh-in after slapping Klitschko across the face when the two went head-to-head during the staredown. More controversy ensued moments before the fight when he spat water in the face of Wladimir whilst in the ring before the pre-fight introductions.

== Fight details ==
Klitschko boxed a disciplined fight with changing angles and superior footwork, and was able to keep the aggressive and offensive Chisora at range for the majority of the rounds. Despite bobbing and weaving, and constant pressure applied by Chisora, Klitschko was able to use his height and reach advantage to land clean straight right hands and power shots from a distance to outland Chisora, and control the pace as the bout progressed. At times, Chisora was able to deliver some punishment of his own, with most of his work coming with body shots and hooks to Klitschko's head, forcing Klitschko onto the back foot, and his best rounds being the eighth and twelfth round.

All three judges unanimously scored the fight in favour of Klitschko, with scores of 118-110, 118-110 and 119-111. Despite being a decisive victory for Klitschko, Chisora earned credit for his chin and heart, and also for giving Klitschko his most competitive fight since his defeat to Lennox Lewis in 2003. Chisora also became only the fourth man (after Tino Hoffmann, Kevin Johnson and Shannon Briggs), to take Klitschko the twelve round distance.

== Aftermath ==
In the post-fight press conference, a brawl ensued between Chisora and former heavyweight champion David Haye. After the altercation, Chisora challenged Haye to a fight in the ring, which subsequently paved the way for the pair's own grudge match later in the year.

Meanwhile, Klitschko would make his ninth defense of his title against then undefeated Manuel Charr at the Olympic Stadium in Moscow, Russia on 8 September 2012, where Klitschko would win via 4th round TKO (due to cuts suffered by Charr) to retain his title. The bout against Charr would turn out to be the last for Vitali, although he would take a year long layoff from the ring before announcing his retirement on 15 December 2013, due to his focus on politics in Ukraine.

This bout was the last time Chisora fought for the WBC heavyweight title until a decade later in 3 December 2022 against then champion Tyson Fury in their trilogy bout.

== Fight card ==
Confirmed bouts:

Weight Class		vs.		Method	Round	Time	Notes
Heavyweight	Vitali Klitschko (c)	def.	Dereck Chisora	UD	12/12		^{Note 1}
Heavyweight	Johnathon Banks (c)	def.	Nicolai Firtha	UD	12/12		^{Note 2}
Super-featherweight	Stephen Smith	def.	Arpad Vass	KO	1/8	2:41
Welterweight	Serhii Fedchenko	def.	Laszlo Fazekas	UD	8/8
Light-middleweight	Timo Schwarzkopf	def.	Andre Deobald	UD	6/6

^Note 1 For WBC heavyweight title
^Note 2 For WBC-NABF heavyweight title

== Broadcasting ==
In Ukraine, where the broadcast started at 11:58 PM and finished at 1:25 AM, the fight averaged almost 10 million viewers and was watched by a total 20.2 million. According to the press-release by Inter published in January 2013, the fight ended up being the most-watched broadcast on Ukrainian television in 2012 with initial analysis reporting a 18.5 nationwide rating (71.7 share). It drew better viewership than any UEFA Euro 2012 football match, including matches of the Ukraine national team. A documentary about the Klitschko brothers Being Faultless (aired at 11:02 PM) and the pre-fight boxing studio Big Boxing (11:33 PM) shared third place with each drawing a 15.5 nationwide rating (share 44.7 and 50.5, respectively).

Country	Broadcasters	
Country	Free-to-air	Cable/Pay TV
Germany (host)	RTL	—N/a
Ukraine	Inter	—N/a
United Kingdom	—N/a	BoxNation
United States	—N/a	Epix

Preceded by vs. Tomasz Adamek	Vitali Klitschko's bouts 18 February 2012	Succeeded by vs. Manuel Charr
Preceded by vs. Robert Helenius	Derek Chisora's bouts 18 February 2012	Succeeded by vs. David Haye
