= Tyson Fury vs. Deontay Wilder III =

Boxing match

Once and for All
- Date: October 9, 2021
- Venue: T-Mobile Arena; Paradise, Nevada, United States
- Title(s) on the line: WBC, and The Ring heavyweight titles

Tale of the tape
Boxer	Tyson Fury	Deontay Wilder
Nickname	The Gypsy King	The Bronze Bomber
Hometown	Manchester, England	Tuscaloosa, Alabama, U.S.
Pre-fight record	30–0–1 (21 KO)	42–1–1 (41 KO)
Age	33 years, 1 month	35 years, 11 months
Height	6 ft 9 in (206 cm)	6 ft 7 in (201 cm)
Weight	277 lb (126 kg)	238 lb (108 kg)
Style	Orthodox (Note: Listed by BoxRec as orthodox, but regularly switch hits as a southpaw.)	Orthodox
Recognition	WBC, TBRB and The Ring; Heavyweight Champion	WBC; No. 1 Ranked Heavyweight; TBRB; No. 2 Ranked Heavyweight; The Ring; No. 3 Ranked Heavyweight

Result
- Fury wins via 11th-round knockout

Tyson Fury vs. Deontay Wilder III, billed as Once and for All, was a professional boxing match contested between WBC and The Ring heavyweight champion, Tyson Fury, and former WBC heavyweight champion, Deontay Wilder. The bout took place on October 9, 2021 at T-Mobile Arena in Paradise, Nevada, United States. The fight, which Fury won via eleventh-round knockout, was widely regarded as the best fight of the year and one of the greatest heavyweight fights of all time, winning the award for The Ring magazine Fight of the Year 2021.

== Background ==
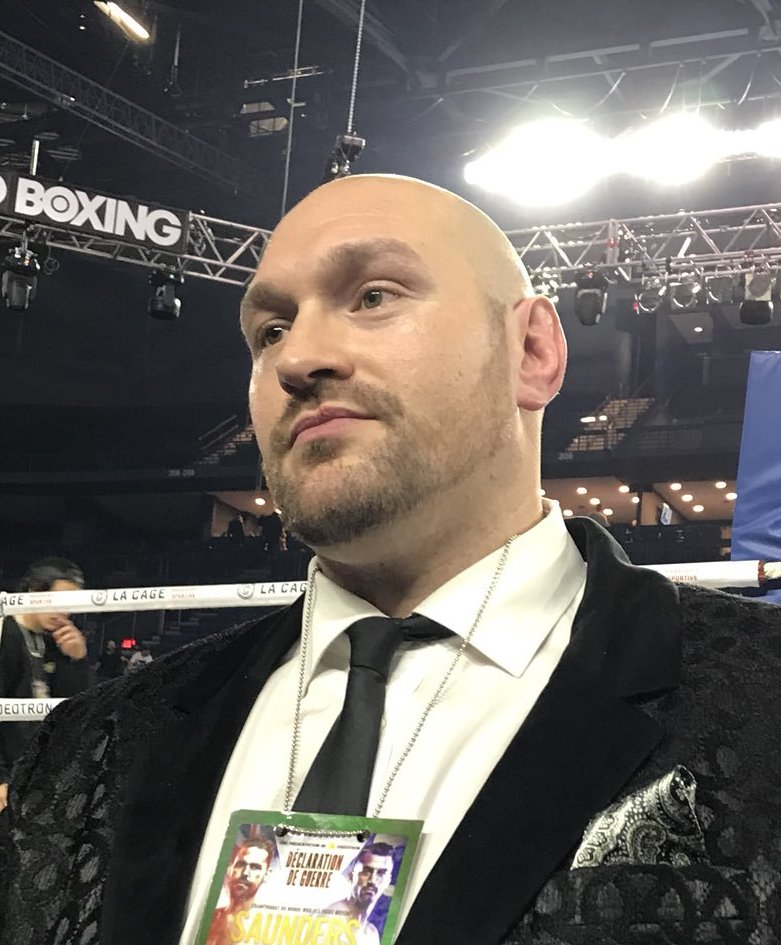
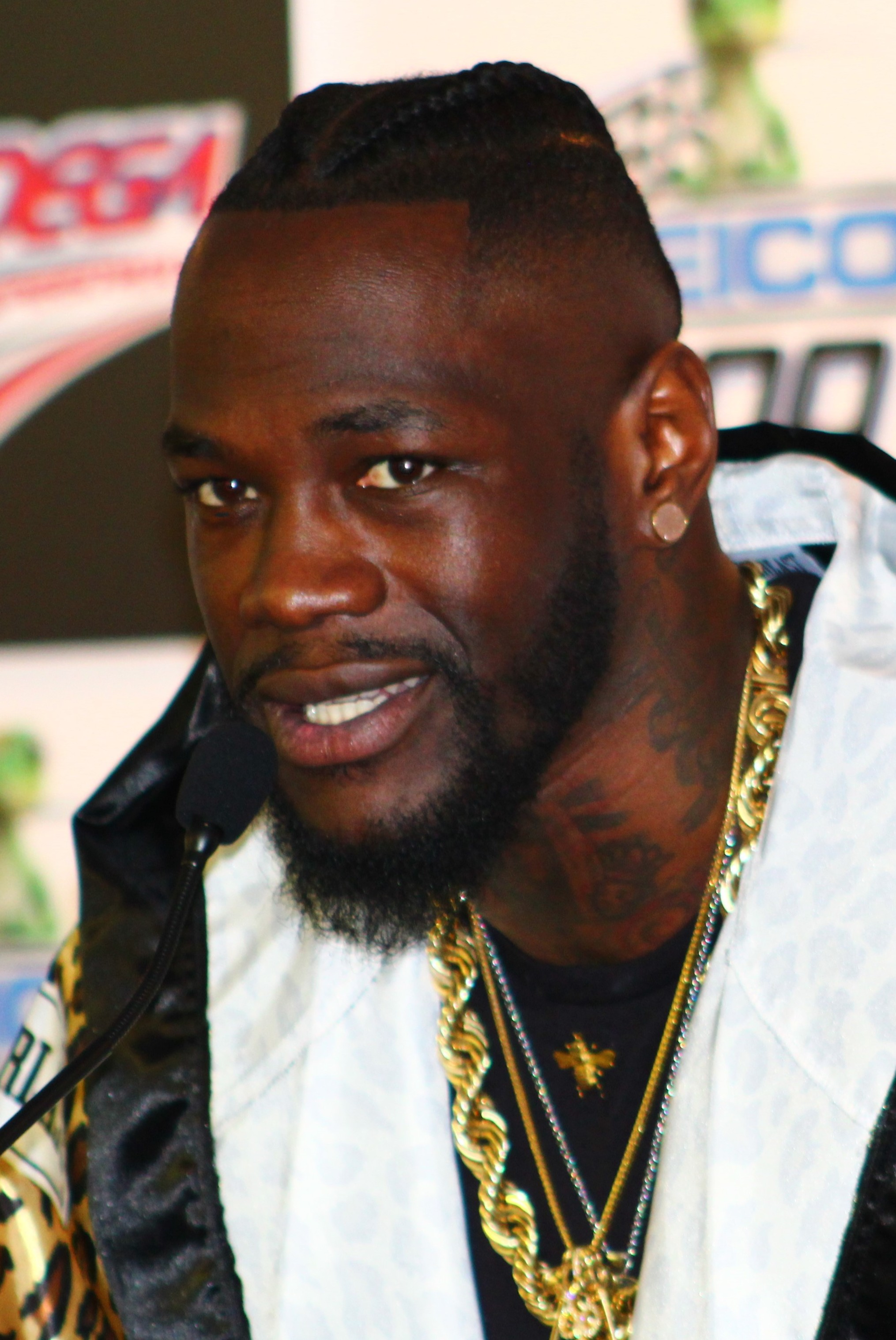
Tyson Fury (left) and Deontay Wilder (right)

Fury and Wilder first fought in December 2018, with the bout ending in a controversial draw. The pair had a rematch in February 2020, with Fury emerging victorious via seventh-round technical knockout to capture the WBC and vacant Ring magazine heavyweight titles. Wilder initiated a contractual rematch clause in March, with the bout initially being scheduled for July 18. However, due to Wilder still recovering from surgery and concerns over the COVID-19 pandemic, the bout was postponed to October. The date was again pushed back to December due to the COVID-19 lockdown restrictions that would limit fan attendance. After ESPN was unwilling to televise the bout as the event would conflict with their NFL schedule, it was suggested the date be pushed back for a third time. Upon hearing the news, Fury announced that he was walking away from the fight, stating, "they asked me if I would agree to push it to December. I agreed to Dec. 19. Then they tried to change the date again into next year. I've been training. I'm ready. When they tried moving off Dec. 19 and pushing to next year, enough was enough. I've moved on." Wilder responded to the comments by releasing a video on social media, accusing Fury of cheating in their February 2020 fight.

With Fury's team insisting the rematch clause had now expired, and Wilder's team insisting the opposite, the teams entered into a mediation process in an attempt to solve the issue, with a legally binding outcome being decided by an arbitration judge. In the meantime, Fury entered negotiations for a unification bout with reigning WBA (Super), IBF and WBO champion, Anthony Joshua. Following months of negotiations between the promoters of Fury and Joshua, an official announcement was said to be imminent. However, on May 17, 2021, it was announced that the arbitration judge had ruled in Wilder's favor, ordering Fury to face Wilder no later than September 15.

Following the arbitration decision, Fury's co-promoter, Bob Arum, revealed a targeted date of July 24, at T-Mobile Arena in Las Vegas. The fight was postponed after Fury tested positive for COVID-19 in July 2021. The new date was announced as October 9, 2021. Both men weighed in at their respective career-heaviest weights, with the champion Fury weighing in at 277 lbs, and the challenger Wilder at 238 lbs.

== The fight ==
Wilder started the fight as the aggressor, jabbing Fury to the body and landing several clean right hands to his chest and stomach in the first round, which all three judges scored for Wilder. In the second, Fury began landing shots of his own and pushed Wilder backwards as the champion looked to establish himself in the fight. Towards the end of the third round, Fury caught Wilder with a right hook to the temple followed by a right uppercut in the clinch, which sent Wilder to the canvas. He made it to his feet and survived the round. As Fury sought to pile on the pressure against Wilder in the fourth round, Wilder landed a left jab followed by a straight right hand to Fury's left temple, stunning the champion and knocking him down. Fury made it to his feet but was floored once more after Wilder connected with a short right hook to behind Fury's ear. Fury beat the count again, and the bell to end the round sounded soon after.

At the beginning of the fifth, Wilder swung heavily at Fury, but the challenger was unable to land any telling blows. Fury then began to reassert himself, and took control of the fight in rounds six, seven, eight, and nine, outstriking Wilder and wobbling him with a number of heavy shots as the challenger began to appear fatigued. In round ten, Fury landed another heavy right hand that sent Wilder sprawling to the canvas for the second time in the fight. Wilder made it to his feet and saw the end of the round. Fury applied more forward pressure in the eleventh round, as he hurt Wilder repeatedly at range and in the clinch. Nearing a minute into the round, Fury landed a clean right hand to Wilder's temple, causing the challenger to collapse to the floor. Referee Russell Mora immediately called a stop to the bout, securing a knockout victory for the defending champion Fury.

== Aftermath ==
After the fight, Fury went over to Wilder and attempted to shake his hand. Wilder rebuffed the attempt and refused to acknowledge Fury. In his post-fight interview, Fury stated "I'm a sportsman. I went over to him to show some love and respect and he didn't show it back. I will pray for him so that God will soften his heart." Fury then added that it "was a great fight tonight, worthy of the best of trilogies." Praise for the fight was immediate and profuse, with fans and pundits describing it as one of the greatest heavyweight bouts in history. Promoter Bob Arum stated he had "never seen a heavyweight fight as magnificent as this" during his 57-year career in boxing.

The WBC ruled that if the winner of the fight doesn't unify with Oleksandr Usyk next, the victor will be ordered to defend the title against Dillian Whyte, the long-standing WBC No. 1 contender. Fury as the victor ultimately defended his WBC and Ring world titles against Whyte on April 23, 2022, winning the bout via sixth-round technical knockout.

== Fight card ==
Confirmed bouts:

Main Card
Weight class				Method	Round	Time	Notes
Heavyweight	(United Kingdom) Tyson Fury (c)	def.	(United States) Deontay Wilder	KO	11/12	1:10	(Note: For WBC and The Ring heavyweight titles)
Heavyweight	(Cuba) Frank Sánchez (c)	def.	(Nigeria) Efe Ajagba	UD	10/10		(Note: For WBC Continental Americas and WBO-NABO heavyweight titles)
Heavyweight	(Finland) Robert Helenius	def.	(Poland) Adam Kownacki	TKO	6/12	2:38
Heavyweight	(United States) Jared Anderson	def.	(Russia) Vladimir Tereshkin	TKO	2/8	2:51	(Note: For vacant NABF Junior heavyweight title)
Undercard
Super middleweight	(United States) Edgar Berlanga	def.	(Argentina) Marcelo Esteban Coceres	UD	10/10		(Note: For vacant WBO–NABO super-middleweight title)
Light middleweight	(Mexico) Vladimir Hernandez	def.	(United States) Julian Williams	SD	10/10
Heavyweight	(Ukraine) Viktor Vikhryst	def.	(United States) Mike Marshall	KO	3/8	1:49

== Broadcasting ==
As with the second fight, the trilogy fight's pay-per-view was a joint presentation of ESPN and Fox Sports, and featured personalities from both networks. This time, Fox handled the majority of production duties for the fight; the Fox Sports PPV for Manny Pacquiao vs. Yordenis Ugás—held at T-Mobile Arena in August—was described by a Fox Sports executive as having been a "dress rehearsal" for Fury-Wilder III.

Country/Region	Free-to-air	Cable/Satellite	Pay-per-view	Stream
United States (host)	—N/a		ESPN PPV Fox Sports	ESPN+ Fox Sports
United Kingdom	—N/a		BT Sport Box Office	
Ireland	—N/a		BT Sport Box Office	
Australia	—N/a		Main Event; Kayo Sports	
Austria	—N/a			DAZN
Germany	—N/a			DAZN
Switzerland	—N/a			DAZN
Baltic States: Estonia; Latvia; Lithuania	—N/a	TV3 Sport	—N/a	Go3
Belgium	—N/a	VOO Sport	—N/a	VOO Sport
France	—N/a	Canal+	—N/a	MyCanal
Greece	—N/a	Cosmote Sport	—N/a	
Indonesia	Indosiar	Fight Sports Champions TV	—N/a	Vidio
Italy	—N/a		Sky Primafila	
Japan	—N/a	Wowow	—N/a	Wowow
Latin America: Argentina; Chile; Colombia; Peru	—N/a	ESPN	—N/a	ESPN
Mexico	Azteca 7	—N/a		TV Azteca Deportes
New Zealand	—N/a		Sky Arena	
Nordic countries: Denmark; Finland; Norway; Sweden	—N/a		Viaplay	
Panama	RPC-TV	—N/a		Medcom Go
Poland	—N/a	TVP Sport	—N/a	—N/a
Russia	REN TV	—N/a		REN TV
Spain	—N/a	Fight Sports	—N/a	Fight Sports
Thailand	PPTV	—N/a		PPTV
Turkey	—N/a			S Sport Plus

== Viewership ==
At a cost of $79.99, the bout generated around 600,000 pay-per-view buys in the United States and around 300,000 buys overseas.

== Notes ==
Preceded by Second fight	Tyson Fury's bouts 9 October 2021	Succeeded by vs. Dillian Whyte
Preceded by Second fight	Deontay Wilder's bouts 9 October 2021	Succeeded by vs. Robert Helenius
Awards
Preceded by Jose Zepeda vs. Ivan Baranchyk	The Ring Fight of the Year; 2021	Next: Leigh Wood vs. Michael Conlan
Preceded by Jose Zepeda vs. Ivan Baranchyk; Round 5	The Ring Round of the Year; Round 4; 2021	Next: Sebastian Fundora vs. Erickson Lubin; Round 7

== See also ==
- Deontay Wilder vs. Tyson Fury
- Deontay Wilder vs. Tyson Fury II
