= Robert Helenius vs. Derek Chisora =

2011 Boxing match

The Night of the Heavyweights
- Date: 3 December 2011
- Venue: Hartwall Arena, Helsinki, Finland
- Title(s) on the line: WBA Inter-Continental, WBO Inter-Continental and vacant European heavyweight titles

Tale of the tape
Boxer	Robert Helenius	Derek Chisora
Nickname	The Nordic Nightmare	Del Boy
Hometown	Lumparland, Åland, Finland	Finchley, London, England
Pre-fight record	16–0 (11 KOs)	15–1 (9 KOs)
Age	27 years, 11 months	27 years, 11 months
Height	6 ft 6 1/2 in (199 cm)	6 ft 2 in (188 cm)
Weight	239 1/2 lb (109 kg)	243 lb (110 kg)
Style	Orthodox	Orthodox
Recognition	WBO; No. 1 Ranked Heavyweight; WBA; No. 3 Ranked Heavyweight; IBF; No. 4 Ranked Heavyweight; WBC; No. 8 Ranked Heavyweight; WBA and WBO Inter-Continental; Heavyweight Champion	

Result
- Helenius wins via 12–round split decision (115–113, 113–115, 115–113)

Robert Helenius vs. Derek Chisora, billed as The Night of the Heavyweights, was a professional boxing match contested between WBA and WBO Inter-Continental heavyweight champion, Robert Helenius, and Derek Chisora, with the vacant European heavyweight title also on the line. The bout took place on 3 December 2011 at the Hartwall Arena, with Helenius winning by split decision.

== Background ==
Helenius scored consecutive knockout wins over former world heavyweight champions, Samuel Peter and Siarhei Liakhovich earlier in the year. Subsequently, positioning Helenius as the WBO's top-ranked contender for Wladimir Klitschko. Chisora regained composure following a loss against Fury in July, securing a points victory over Remigijus Ziausys in November, thereby becoming eligible for a title shot at the European championship.

On 17 October 2011, it was announced Jean-Marc Mormeck had officially relinquished his position as the mandatory challenger for European champion, Alexander Dimitrenko, ahead of a title shot at the world championship against Klitschko on December 10. Consequently, the EBU called a purse bid between Dimitrenko and Helenius. Following multiple postponements, it was announced Helenius and Chisora would contest for the vacant title. Dimitrenko, who was stripped of the belt due to injury, was ordered to face the winner within the next 120 days.

In the chief support, it was announced Alexander Povetkin would defend his WBA (Regular) heavyweight championship against Cedric Boswell. Helenius and Povetkin had previously shared a bill when Povetkin defeated Ruslan Chagaev to win the title.

== Fight details ==
From the opening bell, Chisora started a fast pace, attempting to close the distance and apply sustained pressure, landing hooks to head and body on the inside, with Helenius boxing at range, landing a straight right hand that hurt Chisora momentarily. Chisora was warned twice by referee Adrio Zannoni in the first round. As the early rounds progressed, Chisora continued fighting aggressively, pressing forward and targeting Helenius’s body with relentless combinations and head with overhand rights. Helenius, fighting in front of a home crowd, struggled to establish his jab and appeared uncomfortable under pressure, landing quick shots on the back foot. Chisora’s head movement and inside work allowed him to dictate the pace, with many observers scoring these rounds in his favour. Referee Adrio Zannoni was criticised for repeatedly warning Chisora during the contest, thwarting his offensive efforts. In the middle rounds, the bout grew more competitive. Helenius began to find openings, occasionally landing counters and standing his ground in exchanges. Round six saw both fighters trade heavy shots at close range, with Chisora starting strongly, backing Helenius up against the ropes, and Helenius finishing the round strong, on the front foot in the closing seconds. Still, Chisora’s volume and body attack remained consistent, keeping him marginally ahead in the eyes of many commentators. In the later rounds, fatigue set in, but the intensity never waned, with the bell sounding to start the tenth marking the first time Helenius had been past nine rounds. Chisora continued to press, landing notable right hands and maintaining pressure. Helenius responded with sporadic bursts, but his output lacked the consistency to turn the tide. The twelfth round saw both men trade power punches in a dramatic finish. Helenius won by a controversial split decision with scores of 115–113, 115–113 in his favour, and 115–113 in favour of Chisora. Compubox showed that Helenius landed 140 of his 647 punches thrown (22%) and Chisora landed 278 of his 672 thrown (41%). Chisora did have the edge on power punches, landing 214 compared to 77 from Helenius.

== Aftermath ==
Following Helenius' win, the result was heavily protested by Chisora, his team, and observers alike. Helenius claimed to have sustained an injury in the fight and cited this as a reason for not earning a decisive victory. Both Helenius' and Chisora's teams expressed interest in an immediate rematch.

The fight drew around 20,000 pay-per-view buys in Finland on MTV Katsomo.

Helenius and Chisora both returned to the ring the following year. Chisora, received a title shot at the world championship, facing Vitali Klitschko in February, and Helenius, relinquished his European championship, facing Sherman Williams in November.

=== Cancelled rematch ===
A rematch was set take place once again at Helsinki's Hartwall Arena on 27 May 2017. The rematch was postponed and ultimately cancelled.

== Fight card ==
Confirmed bouts:

Weight Class		vs.		Method	Round	Time	Notes
Heavyweight	Robert Helenius (c)	def.	Derek Chisora	SD	12		^{Note 1}
Heavyweight	Alexander Povetkin (c)	def.	Cedric Boswell	KO	8/12	2:58	^{Note 2}
Welterweight	Cecilia Braekhus (c)	def.	Ku'ulei Kupihea	TKO	10/10	0:57	^{Note 3}
Lightweight	Edis Tatli	def.	Pasquale Di Silvio	UD	10/10
Middleweight	Jack Culcay	def.	Giammario Grassellini	KO	1/10	0:48
Welterweight	Jussi Koivula	def.	Jose del Rio	UD	8/8
Heavyweight	Jarno Rosberg	def.	Manuel Alberto Pucheta	UD	8/8
Heavyweight	Edmund Gerber	def.	Marcus McGee	KO	1/8	0:18
Light heavyweight	Erik Skoglund	def.	Amine Blali	UD	4/4

^Note 1 For WBA Inter-Continental, WBO Inter-Continental and vacant European heavyweight titles
^Note 2 For WBA (Regular) heavyweight title
^Note 3 For WBC and WBO female welterweight titles

== Broadcasting ==
Country	Broadcaster
Country	Cable/Pay TV
United Kingdom	BoxNation
United States	Epix
Germany	Das Erste

Preceded by vs. Siarhei Liakhovich	Robert Helenius's bouts 3 December 2011	Succeeded by vs. Sherman Williams
Preceded by vs. Remigijus Ziausys	Derek Chisora's bouts 3 December 2011	Succeeded by vs. Vitali Klitschko
