= Deontay Wilder vs. Robert Helenius =

Boxing competition

Heavyweight Showdown
- Date: October 15, 2022
- Venue: Barclays Center, Brooklyn, New York, U.S.

Tale of the tape
Boxer	(United States) Deontay Wilder	(Finland) Robert Helenius
Nickname	"The Bronze Bomber"	"The Nordic Nightmare"
Hometown	Tuscaloosa, Alabama, U.S.	Lumparland, Åland, Finland
Pre-fight record	42–2–1 (41 KO)	31–3 (20 KO)
Age	36 years, 11 months	38 years, 9 months
Height	6 ft 7 in (201 cm)	6 ft 6 1/2 in (199 cm)
Weight	214 lb (97 kg)	253 lb (115 kg)
Style	Orthodox	Orthodox
Recognition	WBC; No. 1 Ranked Heavyweight; IBF; No. 4 Ranked Heavyweight; The Ring; No. 2 Ranked Heavyweight; TBRB; No. 3 Ranked Heavyweight	WBC; No. 5 Ranked Heavyweight

Result
- Wilder wins via 1st-round KO

Deontay Wilder vs. Robert Helenius, billed as Heavyweight Showdown, was a heavyweight professional boxing match between former WBC heavyweight champion, Deontay Wilder, and Finnish heavyweight boxer, Robert Helenius. The bout took place on October 15, 2022, at the Barclays Center in Brooklyn, New York City. It reportedly sold 75,000 PPV buys.

== Background ==
In August 2022, it was announced that Wilder will have his first fight a year later after his Fury loss. It was announced Wilder would be facing Finland's Robert Helenius, with the fight scheduled to take place on October 15, 2022, at Brooklyn's Barclays Center.

== Fight recap ==
Wilder won via knockout with a short right hand at 2:57 of the first round.

== Fight card ==
Weight Class		vs.		Method	Round	Time	Notes
Heavyweight	Deontay Wilder	def.	Robert Helenius	KO	1/12	2:57
Super middleweight	Caleb Plant	def.	Anthony Dirrell	KO	9/12	2:57
Bantamweight	Emmanuel Rodríguez	def.	Gary Antonio Russell	TD	10/12	0:02
Heavyweight	Frank Sánchez	def.	Carlos Negrón	TKO	9/10	1:36
Super welterweight	Vito Mielnicki Jr	def.	Limberth Ponce	UD	10
Heavyweight	Gurgen Hovhannisyan	def.	Michael Polite Coffie	RTD	6/8
Heavyweight	Geovany Bruzon	def.	James Evans	TKO	3/6	1:18
Super bantamweight	Michael Angeletti	def.	Jeremy Adorno	RTD	5/6	3:00
Super bantamweight	Miguel Roman	def.	Jose Negrete	UD	4
Lightweight	Michel Rivera	def.	Jerry Perez	UD	8
Welterweight	Keeshawn Williams	def.	Julio Rosa	UD	6

Preceded by vs. Tyson Fury III	Deontay Wilder's bouts 15 October 2022	Succeeded by vs. Joseph Parker
Preceded by vs. Adam Kownacki	Robert Helenius's bouts 15 October 2022	Succeeded by vs. Mika Mielonen
