= Deontay Wilder vs. Tyson Fury II =

Boxing match

Unfinished Business
- Date: February 22, 2020
- Venue: MGM Grand Garden Arena, Paradise, Nevada, U.S.
- Title(s) on the line: WBC and vacant TBRB/The Ring heavyweight titles

Tale of the tape
Boxer	Deontay Wilder	Tyson Fury
Nickname	The Bronze Bomber	The Gypsy King
Hometown	Tuscaloosa, Alabama, U.S.	Manchester, England
Purse	$5,000,000	$5,000,000
Pre-fight record	42–0–1 (41 KO)	29–0–1 (20 KO)
Age	34 years, 4 months	31 years, 6 months
Height	6 ft 7 in (201 cm)	6 ft 9 in (206 cm)
Weight	231 lb (105 kg)	273 lb (124 kg)
Style	Orthodox	Orthodox
Recognition	WBC; Heavyweight Champion; TBRB; No. 1 Ranked Heavyweight; The Ring; No. 2 Ranked Heavyweight	Lineal; Heavyweight Champion; WBC/TBRB; No. 2 Ranked Heavyweight; The Ring; No. 1 Ranked Heavyweight

Result
- Fury wins via seventh-round technical knockout

Deontay Wilder vs. Tyson Fury II, billed as Unfinished Business, was a heavyweight professional boxing rematch between undefeated and reigning WBC champion Deontay Wilder and undefeated former unified heavyweight champion Tyson Fury, for the WBC and vacant TBRB and The Ring heavyweight titles. The event took place on February 22, 2020, at the MGM Grand Garden Arena, Paradise, Nevada. Fury won the bout by seventh-round technical knockout (TKO).

The first fight had ended in a controversial split draw. Commentators thought that Fury had done enough to dethrone Wilder in the first bout, but uncertainty remained as Fury had been knocked down twice, and the bookmakers had Wilder as a slight favorite going into the rematch. In the rematch, Fury dominated Wilder, knocking him down twice, before Wilder's corner threw in the towel in the seventh round.

The fight was jointly promoted by Al Haymon's Premier Boxing Champions, Bob Arum's Top Rank and Frank Warren's Queensberry Promotions. According to Arum, it was confirmed that it achieved 800,000–850,000 pay-per-view buys in the United States. Fury's performance gained widespread praise; it was hailed as "sensational" and one of the most impressive displays from a heavyweight title bout in recent years.

== Background ==
The fight was a rematch after the controversial split decision draw between Wilder and Fury on December 1, 2018. Out of 27 prominent boxing journalists, 15 scored Fury as the winner of the first bout, 3 scored it for Wilder, and 9 scored it as a draw.

After the bout, there were calls for an immediate rematch. The WBC announced in February 2019 that there would not be an immediate rematch as Fury signed a contract with ESPN and Top Rank that meant the negotiations would be more difficult as the rematch would be a co-promotion, of which there had only been two before: Lennox Lewis vs. Mike Tyson in 2002 and Floyd Mayweather Jr. vs. Manny Pacquiao in 2015.

As the rematch was delayed, Fury and Wilder both scheduled fights for the interim. On May 18, 2019, Wilder faced Dominic Breazeale (20–1, 18 KOs) and recorded a first-round KO. A few weeks later on June 15, 2019, Fury took on Tom Schwarz (24–0, 16 KOs) and scored a second-round TKO. Fury followed this stoppage win with a 12-round unanimous decision victory over Otto Wallin (20–0, 13 KOs) on September 14, 2019. Wilder then had a rematch with Luis Ortiz (31–1, 26 KOs) on November 23, 2019, and won by seventh-round KO.

Both Fury and Wilder called each other out after their fights, and the rematch was officially announced on December 27, 2019, for February 22, 2020 at the MGM Grand Garden Arena in Las Vegas.

== Weigh in ==
Fury weighed in at 273 pounds (124 kg), the third heaviest weight of his professional career and 17 pounds (7.7 kg) heavier than his weight for the first Wilder bout. He stated in the lead-up to the fight that he wanted extra size and power to look for a knockout. Wilder weighed in at 231 pounds (105 kg), the second heaviest of his career.

== Fight card ==
Weight Class		vs.		Method	Round	Time	Notes
Heavyweight	(United Kingdom) Tyson Fury	def.	(United States) Deontay Wilder (c)	TKO	7/12	1:39	^Note 1
Heavyweight	(United States) Charles Martin	def.	(United States) Gerald Washington	TKO	6/12	1:57	^Note 2
Junior featherweight	(Mexico) Emanuel Navarrete	def.	(Philippines) Jeo Santisima	TKO	11/12	2:20	^Note 3
Light middleweight	(United States) Sebastian Fundora	def.	(Australia) Daniel Lewis	UD	10	–
Light welterweight	(United States) Javier Molina	def.	(United States) Amir Imam	UD	8	–
Light welterweight	(Russia) Petros Ananyan	def.	(Puerto Rico) Subriel Matías	UD	10	–

^Note 1 For the WBC, The Ring, and lineal heavyweight titles

^Note 2 Title eliminator match for the IBF heavyweight title.

^Note 3 For the WBO junior featherweight title

== Fight details ==
=== Purses ===
According to the Nevada State Athletic Commission, Fury and Wilder had base purses of $5 million, though both had more than $25 million in guaranteed earnings, plus percentages of pay-per-view profits.

Guaranteed base purses

- Deontay Wilder ($5 million) vs. Tyson Fury ($5 million)
- Charles Martin ($250,000) vs. Gerald Washington ($275,000)
- Emanuel Navarrete ($300,000) vs. Jeo Tupas Santisima ($25,000)
- Sebastian Fundora ($40,000) vs. Daniel Lewis ($35,000)
- Subriel Matias ($50,000) vs. Petros Ananyan ($30,000)
- Amir Imam ($30,000) vs. Javier Molina ($35,000)
- Rolando Romero ($8,000) vs. Arturs Ahmetovs ($7,000)
- Gabriel Flores Jr. ($15,000) vs. Matt Conway ($20,000)
- Vito Mielnicki Jr. ($4,000) vs. Corey Champion ($5,000)
- Isaac Lowe ($30,000) vs. Alberto Guevara ($6,000)

=== Broadcasting ===
Due to the fighters' respective television rights being held by the two networks, it was announced that the United States pay-per-view of the fight would be a joint presentation of ESPN (Top Rank rightsholder) and Fox Sports (PBC rightsholder). The PPV was largely produced by ESPN staff, and was called by Lennox Lewis and Andre Ward, joined by ESPN's Joe Tessitore at ringside. Timothy Bradley (ESPN), Max Kellerman (ESPN), Brian Kenny (Fox), and Shawn Porter (Fox) served as analysts. In addition to television providers, the PPV was also sold digitally via ESPN+ and Fox Sports' digital platforms.

During the week leading up to the fight, both ESPN and Fox Sports 1 aired editions of their studio programs from around the MGM Grand complex: ESPN broadcast special editions of First Take, Max on Boxing, and SportsCenter on-location from a stage outside the Kà theater, while Fox Sports 1 likewise aired editions of Speak for Yourself from the MGM Grand Race & Sports Book. Both networks aired promos for the event during flagship sports telecasts, including the 2020 College Football Playoff National Championship and Super Bowl LIV. Fox produced a four-part documentary series, Inside Wilder-Fury II, to hype the fight.

ESPN employed its largest production it had ever used for a boxing telecast, including 38 cameras (which included a pair of new wide-angle "bumper cams" installed within the mat on two corners of the ring), microphones above the ring, and a 360-degree replay system. Top Rank owner Bob Arum stated that there were provisional plans for a six-match preliminary undercard that would be split between Top Rank and PBC, with separate telecasts on an ESPN network and a Fox Sports network to air their respective half of the card. The two-fight preliminary card was simulcast between ESPN (with the first half-hour airing on ESPNews due to scheduling conflicts), Fox Sports 1, and Fox Deportes in Spanish.

In the United Kingdom and Ireland, BT Sport Box Office acquired rights to the PPV. BT Sport sub-licensed shoulder content to ITV, including a rematch between Brad Foster and Lucien Reid from York Hall for the BBBoC super-bantamweight title on the night of the event.

The world feed was called by PBC's Ray Flores and Top Rank's Crystina Poncher.

Country/region	Broadcaster			
Country/region	Free to air	Cable/pay television	PPV	Stream
United States (host)	—N/a	ESPN	ESPN PPV	ESPN+ PPV
United States (host)	—N/a	ESPNews	ESPN PPV	ESPN+ PPV
United States (host)	—N/a	ESPN Deportes+ on ESPN3	ESPN PPV	ESPN+ PPV
United States (host)	—N/a	FS1	Fox Sports PPV	
United States (host)	—N/a	Fox Deportes	Fox Sports PPV	
United Kingdom	—N/a		BT Sport Box Office	
Ireland	—N/a		BT Sport Box Office	
Australia	—N/a		Main Event	—N/a
Austria	—N/a			DAZN
Germany	—N/a			DAZN
Italy	—N/a			DAZN
Spain	—N/a			DAZN
Switzerland	—N/a			DAZN
Baltics: Estonia; Latvia; Lithuania	—N/a	TV3 Sport	—N/a	Go3
Bulgaria	—N/a	Ring	—N/a	Voyo
Canada	—N/a		Various	—N/a
France	—N/a	Canal+ Sport	—N/a	My Canal
Indonesia	tvOne	—N/a		VIVA
Indonesia	Mola TV		—N/a	Mola TV On Demand
Timor-Leste	Mola TV		—N/a	Mola TV On Demand
Japan	—N/a	Wowow	—N/a	Wowow
Latin America: Argentina; Bolivia; Chile; Colombia; Costa Rica; Dominican Republic; Ecuador; El Salvador; Guatemala; Honduras; Mexico; Nicaragua; Panama; Paraguay; Peru; Uruguay; Venezuela	—N/a	ESPN	—N/a	WatchESPN
MENA: Algeria; Bahrain; Egypt; Iraq; Jordan; Kuwait; Lebanon; Morocco; Oman; Qatar; Saudi Arabia; Tunisia; United Arab Emirates	—N/a			Fight Sports MAX
Mexico	Azteca 7	—N/a		Azteca En Vivo
Netherlands	—N/a			Kijk
New Zealand	—N/a		Sky Arena	—N/a
Nordic countries: Denmark; Finland; Norway; Sweden	—N/a		Viaplay	
Panama	RPC-TV	—N/a		Medcom Go
Philippines	—N/a		Cignal PPV	Cignal Play
Philippines	—N/a		Sky Sports	Sky On Demand
Poland	TVP Sport	—N/a		TVP Stream
Russia	REN TV	—N/a		REN TV
Sub-Saharan Africa: Angola; Benin; Botswana; Burkina Faso; Burundi; Cameroon; Cape Verde; Central African Republic; Chad; Comoros; Congo; DR Congo; Djibouti; Equatorial Guinea; Eritrea; Eswatini; Ethiopia; Gabon; Gambia; Ghana; Guinea; Guinea-Bissau; Ivory Coast; Kenya; Lesotho; Liberia; Madagascar; Malawi; Mali; Mauritania; Mauritius; Mozambique; Namibia; Niger; Nigeria; Rwanda; Sao Tome and Principe; Senegal; Sierra Leone; Somalia; South Africa; South Sudan; Sudan; Seychelles; Tanzania; Togo; Uganda; Zimbabwe; Zambia	—N/a	SuperSport	—N/a	DStv Now
Thailand	PPTV	—N/a		PPTV
Turkey	DMAX	—N/a		DMAX

== Recap ==
The start of the fight saw Fury take the center of the ring and establish his jab. He looked for some big shots, while evading Wilder's swings. In the third round, Fury floored Wilder with a strong right hand to the temple. Wilder beat the count and survived the round but was visibly disoriented, as blood began to stream from his left ear. Wilder fell to the canvas twice more, but they were ruled as slips by the referee Kenny Bayless, before Fury knocked Wilder down again in the fifth round with a quick combination punctuated by a left hook to the body. Wilder made it to his feet again, but was unable to muster much in the way of a counterattack and he was now bleeding from the mouth as well as the ear. The fight was stopped midway through the seventh round after a flurry of hard-hitting shots from Fury caused Wilder's corner to throw in the towel to save him from further punishment.

At the time of stoppage Fury was ahead on all three judges' scorecards 59–52, 58–53, and 59–52, with the irregular scores due to Bayless deducting a point from Fury in the fifth for holding. According to CompuBox, Fury landed 82 of his 267 total punches (31%), including 58 out of 160 power punches (36%). Wilder landed 34 of 141 his total punches (24%), and 18 out of 55 power punches (33%).

== Aftermath ==
Fury received widespread praise for his performance, with many boxing analysts believing that it established one of the best boxing comeback stories ever seen, and that the victory placed Fury as one of the greatest heavyweight boxers in history.

After the fight, Wilder complained that his cornerman Mark Breland had thrown in the towel, "I told all my trainers, no matter how it may look on the outside, no matter how you may love me or have that emotional feeling, don't make an emotional decision and do not ever throw that towel in because my pride is everything. I understand what it looks like but when you have power like me I am never out of a fight, no matter what the circumstances. I'm never out of a fight." Wilder initially considered firing Breland, an Olympic gold medalist and two-time world champion, but decided to keep him on the team. However, it was confirmed in October 2020 that Wilder did eventually split up with Breland.

Wilder attributed his defeat to factors including his water "being spiked as if I took a muscle relaxer", his ring-walk costume being "way too heavy for me... it weighed 40lb with the helmet and all the batteries", and that Fury had "scratched flesh out of my ears which caused them to bleed". Wilder's attempts at justifying his loss were widely criticized and labeled by many as "excuses", including by Tyson Fury himself, former undisputed heavyweight champion Mike Tyson, and heavyweight rivals Anthony Joshua and Dillian Whyte. Despite the widespread criticism of Wilder's allegations, for which he provided no credible evidence to support, he did not back down; on October 31, 2020, he issued a series of statements on social media continuing to accuse Fury of cheating, as well as asking for a trilogy bout. In one tweet directed at Fury, Wilder stated, "I was offered more money to fight [Anthony] Joshua than I was getting to fight you [Fury]." Both Joshua and his promoter Eddie Hearn reacted by confirming the veracity of the statement, happy at its implication that it was Wilder who had previously avoided a proposed undisputed fight with Joshua, and not the other way around.

Wilder and his coach Jay Deas were ridiculed for stating that Wilder's ring-walk outfit, a 40 lb suit and helmet that he wore to mark "Black History Month", may have contributed to the loss to Fury. Commentators noted that Wilder had said in a 2018 interview with Joe Rogan that he wears a 45 lb weight vest while training, which cast further doubt over the outfit excuse. Deontay Wilder has continued to accuse both Fury's team as well as his own team of foul play, including his own trainer Mark Breland of spiking his water, claiming the use of egg-shaped weights in Fury's gloves, and even asserting that Fury cast a 'gypsy spell' upon him.

=== Trilogy fight ===
The fight contract between Fury and Wilder included a clause in which the loser could unilaterally invoke a trilogy fight. Wilder announced on February 29 that he had activated the clause, and vowed redemption in a video posted on his social media accounts, "We will rise again. We will regain the title. I will be back. We will hold our heads up high. Your king is in great spirit. We will rise like a phoenix from the ashes and regain the title. I'll see you in a few months. For the war has just begun."

The third fight was tentatively set for July 18, but was postponed due to the COVID-19 pandemic, with October being a potential replacement. Fury's promoter, Bob Arum, said in April that October was out of the question, saying, "I talked to Tyson Fury on Sunday and I told him the earliest I thought the fight could happen is November. Who knows even about November? Obviously, we cannot do Fury and Wilder without an audience. If you are going to do it with an audience, are people going to be willing to get on a plane and come to Las Vegas? So many of the fans come from the UK. A lot of that has to be taken into account. Maybe it doesn't happen until next year." The second fight had a 50–50 purse split, but by invoking the rematch clause Wilder contractually agreed to a 60–40 split in Fury's favor for the trilogy.

In October 2020, Tyson Fury confirmed claims that he would no longer fight Wilder a third time, citing difficulties in contractual negotiations in finding a suitable date for the bout to take place. Wilder's manager Shelly Finkel rejected those claims and stated that the bout would take place in December 2020, which was later called off for lack of interest from broadcasters, Fox and ESPN, in light of College Football season unexpectedly returning to action the same month.

A third fight between the two was booked on May 23, 2021, and was scheduled to happen in Las Vegas, Nevada on July 24, 2021, but was postponed due to COVID-19 issues in the Fury group. The fight was then rescheduled for October 9, 2021. Fury won the third fight by eleventh-round knockout.

== Viewership ==
At a cost of $79.99, the bout generated between 800,000 and 850,000 pay-per-view buys in the United States via traditional television providers, up from approximately 325,000 buys for the first fight. Arum estimated that there were "well over" 300,000 buys via digital platforms (placing the estimated total closer to 1.2 million pay-per-view buys).

Arum also told Bad Left Hook that he was satisfied with the commercial performance and the collaboration of ESPN and Fox Sports, adding that "we were used to getting all buys on Dish Network and cable networks, but there's a new monster in the room, digital, they are now accounting for a huge percentage. Everything's different, and it's never going back."

Piracy of the PPV on streaming platforms was also widespread, with VFT Solutions estimating that there were between 10 and 20 million views of the fight via illegal streams on major social media platforms such as Facebook and Twitter, and around 10 million more people who watched the fight on illegal streaming websites.

== National anthems ==
Country	Anthem	Singer	Ref
United Kingdom	God Save the Queen	Danny Walten	
United States	The Star-Spangled Banner	Gavin DeGraw	

== See also ==
- Deontay Wilder vs. Tyson Fury
- Tyson Fury vs. Deontay Wilder III

Preceded by vs. Luis Ortiz II	Deontay Wilder's bouts 22 February 2020	Succeeded by Rematch
Preceded by vs. Otto Wallin	Tyson Fury's bouts 22 February 2020	Succeeded by Rematch
