= Franz Rill =

German boxer

Personal information
- Nickname: Frankie
- Nationality: German; Canadian
- Born: Franz Johann Rill; 1 December 1987 (age 38) Oshawa, Ontario, Canada
- Height: 194 cm (6 ft 4 in)
- Weight: Heavyweight

Boxing career
- Stance: Orthodox

Boxing record
- Total fights: 18
- Wins: 16
- Win by KO: 11
- Losses: 2

Franz Rill (born 1 December 1987) is a Canadian-German former professional boxer. He held the IBF International heavyweight title in 2016. Franz challenged for the European title in 2015 but lost to Robert Helenius.

== Professional boxing record ==
18 fights, 16 wins (11 knockouts), 2 losses (1 knockouts)
No.	Result	Record	Opponent	Type	Round, time	Date	Location	Notes
18	Win	16-2	(Mexico) Luis Pascual	UD	8	8 Sep 2018	(Canada) Paramount Fine Foods Centre, Mississauga, Ontario	
17	Win	15-2	(Argentina) Sebastian Ignacio Ceballos	TKO	1 (8), 1:36	17 Mar 2018	(Canada) Hershey Centre, Mississauga, Ontario	
16	Win	14-2	(Argentina) Ricardo Humberto Ramirez	KO	2 (8), 0:57	16 Dec 2017	(Canada) Hershey Centre, Mississauga, Ontario	
15	Loss	13-2	(Sweden) Adrian Granat	TKO	6 (12), 1:30	15 Oct 2016	(Germany) G 18-Halle, Wilhelmsburg, Hamburg	Lost IBF International Heavyweight title.
14	Win	13-1	(Italy) Salvatore Erittu	KO	4 (12), 0:56	24 Jun 2016	(Italy) Rigamonti Stadium, Brescia, Lombardia	Won vacant IBF International Heavyweight title.
13	Win	12-1	(Bosnia and Herzegovina) Marko Colic	KO	3 (8), 0:50	06 Mar 2016	(Germany) Stadthalle, Greifswald, Mecklenburg-Vorpommern	
12	Loss	11-1	(Finland) Robert Helenius	UD	12	19 Dec 2015	(Finland) Hartwall Arena, Helsinki	For vacant EBU (European), IBF International Heavyweight title.
11	Win	11-0	(Serbia) Branislav Plavsic	TKO	1 (8), 0:43	6 Sep 2015	(Germany) Markthalle, Wismar	
10	Win	10-0	(England) Paul Butlin	UD	8	17 Jul 2015	(Germany) MHP Arena, Ludwigsburg	
9	Win	9-0	(Hungary) Andras Csomor	KO	2 (8), 1:35	2 May 2015	(Germany) Mehrzweckh, Greifswald	
8	Win	8-0	(Spain) Gabriel Enguema	UD	8	14 Mar 2015	(Germany) Alte Reithalle, Stuttgart	
7	Win	7-0	(Ukraine) Oleksiy Mazikin	PTS	8	12 Dec 2014	(Germany) Eintracht Berlin Sportzentrum, Schöneberg, Berlin	
6	Win	6-0	(Hungary) Istvan Ruzsinszky	KO	1 (6), 1:04	8 Nov 2014	(Germany) Gym 80, Koblenz	
5	Win	5-0	(Hungary) Laszlo Toth	TKO	1 (8), 1:18	21 Mar 2014	(Germany)	
4	Win	4-0	(Croatia) Ivo Andelic	TKO	4 (6), 2:02	16 Nov 2013	(Germany) MHP Arena, Ludwigsburg	
3	Win	3-0	(France) Alban Galonnier	KO	2 (6), 0:47	7 Sep 2013	(Germany)	
2	Win	2-0	(Germany) Lonja Fanta	KO	1 (6), 2:59	29 Jun 2013	(Germany)	
1	Win	1-0	(Canada) Craig Hudson	UD	4	15 Sep 2012	(Canada) Sleeman Centre, Guelph, Ontario	
