= Sławomir Bohdziewicz =

Polish boxer (born 1990)

Personal information
- Nickname: Slav
- Born: August 16, 1990 (age 35) Wałbrzych, Poland
- Height: 6 ft 2 in (188 cm)
- Weight: Cruiserweight

Boxing career
- Reach: N/A
- Stance: Orthodox

Boxing record
- Total fights: 9
- Wins: 8
- Win by KO: 7
- Losses: 1

Sławomir Bohdziewicz is a Polish professional boxer.

== Professional career ==
Bohdziewicz would make his pro debut on April 22, 2023 against Max da Silva. He won the fight against da Silva via KO in the 3rd round.

After racking up a decent number of wins, Bohdziewicz was set to face his toughest challenge yet in Joe Jones who is more experienced. The two were set to clash on February 22, 2025. This fight would end up getting canceled two hours before, as Bohdziewicz announced during the show, that Jones was apprehended by Police and is currently in jail.

His official return to the ring came on May 10, 2025, 8 months after his last fight. He would take on Russell Harris. Bohdziewicz won the fight via a sixth-round TKO, and thus keeping his undefeated status.

After another half-year hiatus, Bohdziewicz returned on November 1, 2025, against Cesar Lopez Ugarte. Bohdziewicz won the fight via a second-round knockout.

== Personal life ==
Bohdziewicz currently resides in Stamford, Connecticut. He is a Personal Trainer at his local gym, Heavy Hitting Boxing. He is a training partner of fellow Polish boxer, Adam Kownacki.

== Professional boxing record ==
9 fights	8 wins	1 loss
By knockout	7	0
By decision	1	1

No.	Result	Record	Opponent	Type	Round, time	Date	Location	Notes
9	Win	8–1	Russ Kimber	TKO	2 (6), 2:10	24 Jul 2026	Mohegan Sun Arena, Uncasville, Connecticut, U.S.	
8	Loss	7–1	Jose Carlos Rivera	MD	6	18 Apr 2026	Connecticut Convention Center, Hartford, Connecticut, U.S.	
7	Win	7–0	Cesar Lopez Ugarte	KO	2 (6), 1:21	1 Nov 2025	Mohegan Sun Arena, Uncasville, Connecticut, U.S.	
6	Win	6–0	Russell Harris	TKO	6 (6), 2:15	10 May 2025	Foxwoods Resort Casino, Mashantucket, Connecticut, U.S.	
5	Win	5–0	Kevin Torian	KO	4 (6), 1:49	7 Sep 2024	Foxwoods Resort Casino, Mashantucket, Connecticut, U.S.	
4	Win	4–0	Leonardo Ladeira	UD	4	15 Jun 2024	Mohegan Sun Arena, Uncasville, Connecticut, U.S.	
3	Win	3–0	Bruno Saraiva	KO	2 (4), 1:20	3 Feb 2024	Mohegan Sun Arena, Uncasville, Connecticut, U.S.	
2	Win	2–0	Gabriel Aguilar Costa	KO	2 (4), 2:40	12 Aug 2023	Mohegan Sun Arena, Uncasville, Connecticut, U.S.	
1	Win	1–0	Max da Silva	KO	3 (4), 1:28	22 Apr 2023	Mohegan Sun Arena, Uncasville, Connecticut, U.S.	
