= Adrian Granat =

Swedish boxer (born 1991)

Personal information
- Nickname: Gäddan ("The Pike")
- Born: Carl Wilhelm Adrian Granat; 26 April 1991 (age 35) Malmö, Sweden
- Height: 201 cm (6 ft 7 in)
- Weight: Heavyweight

Boxing career
- Stance: Orthodox

Boxing record
- Total fights: 19
- Wins: 17
- Win by KO: 16
- Losses: 2

Carl Wilhelm Adrian Granat (born 26 April 1991) is a Swedish professional boxer.

== Amateur career ==
Having started boxing at age 13, he won gold in the Swedish Championship at 17 in 2009. He won gold again in 2012.

== Professional career ==
Granat turned pro in 2013 and won his first professional bout by knocking out Patryk Kowoll in the second round. He then continued to win fights against Gianluca Sirci, Aziz Baran, Andreas Kapp, and Tomas Mrazek.

On 31 October 2014 Granat fought the former British and Commonwealth heavyweight title holder Danny Williams (46-23, with 34 KOs). Granat won the bout by TKO, 0:48 into the second round.

== Professional boxing record ==
19 fights	17 wins	2 losses
By knockout	16	1
By decision	1	1

No.	Result	Record	Opponent	Type	Round, time	Date	Location	Notes
19	Win	17–2	Rydell Booker	KO	9 (10), 2:12	30 Oct 2026	Boxsporthalle Braamkamp, Winterhude, Hamburg, Germany	
18	Win	16–2	Maximiliano Alejandro Sosa	KO	1 (8), 1:59	5 Sep 2026	MENSA 1, Fahrdorf, Germany	
17	Loss	15–2	Otto Wallin	UD	12	21 Apr 2018	Gärdehov, Sundsvall, Sweden	For vacant European Union and Swedish heavyweight titles
16	Win	15–1	Irakli Gvenetadze	TKO	4 (8), 1:20	22 Dec 2017	Alsterdorfer Sporthalle, Hamburg, Germany	
15	Loss	14–1	Alexander Dimitrenko	TKO	1 (12), 2:07	18 Mar 2017	Baltiska hallen, Malmö, Sweden	Lost IBF International heavyweight title
14	Win	14–0	Franz Rill	TKO	6 (12), 1:30	15 Oct 2016	G 18-Halle, Hamburg, Germany	Won IBF International heavyweight title
13	Win	13–0	Saul Farah	TKO	1 (10), 2:59	4 Jun 2016	Autohaus Duerkop, Kassel, Germany	
12	Win	12–0	Samir Kurtagic	TKO	6 (8)	18 Mar 2016	Circus, Bucharest, Romania	
11	Win	11–0	Evgeny Orlov	TKO	2 (8)	19 Feb 2016	Palais des Sports, Agde, France	
10	Win	10–0	Michael Sprott	KO	1 (8), 2:55	5 Dec 2015	Inselparkhalle, Hamburg, Germany	
9	Win	9–0	Darnell Wilson	KO	2 (8), 2:32	24 Oct 2015	Schulsporthalle, Hamburg, Germany	
8	Win	8–0	Konstantin Airich	TKO	3 (8), 2:44	28 Aug 2015	Pationoarul Dunarea, Galați, Romania	
7	Win	7–0	Haris Radmilovic	KO	1 (6), 1:10	11 Jul 2015	Landkostarena, Bestensee, Germany	
6	Win	6–0	Danny Williams	KO	2 (6), 0:48	31 Oct 2014	Kugelbake-Halle, Niedersachsen, Germany	
5	Win	5–0	Tomas Mrazek	UD	6	13 Sep 2014	TAP 1, Copenhagen, Denmark	
4	Win	4–0	Andreas Kapp	TKO	1 (6), 2:30	16 May 2014	CU Arena, Hamburg, Germany	
3	Win	3–0	Aziz Baran	TKO	2 (4)	11 Apr 2014	Universal Hall, Berlin, Germany	
2	Win	2–0	Gianluca Sirci	KO	2 (4)	27 Mar 2014	Göta Källare, Stockholm, Sweden	
1	Win	1–0	Patryk Kowoll	TKO	2 (4), 2:00	8 Nov 2013	Kalmar Sporthall, Kalmar, Sweden	
