= Gerald Washington (boxer) =

American boxer (born 1982)

Personal information
- Nickname: El Gallo Negro (The Black Rooster)
- Born: April 23, 1982 (age 44) San Jose, California, U.S.
- Height: 6 ft 6 in (198 cm)
- Weight: Heavyweight

Boxing career
- Reach: 82 in (208 cm)
- Stance: Orthodox

Boxing record
- Total fights: 29
- Wins: 21
- Win by KO: 14
- Losses: 7
- Draws: 1

Gerald Washington (born April 23, 1982) is an American professional boxer. He has challenged once for the WBC heavyweight title in 2017.

== Early life ==
Washington was born to an African American father and a Mexican American mother, and lived in Mexico for part of his childhood. Growing up, Washington played tennis and one season of high school football. Washington later served in the United States Navy as a helicopter mechanic Despite having played one season of organized football, he enrolled at Chaffey College in Rancho Cucamonga, California and was an NJCAA All-American as a tight end. As a junior, Washington transferred to play for the University of Southern California, where he played tight end as well as defensive end, but had a difficult time staying on the field due to injuries. In the NFL, he went undrafted and was a member of the Seattle Seahawks and Buffalo Bills practice squads.

== Professional career ==
=== Early career ===
At the relatively advanced age of 30, Washington made his professional debut in 2012, having had no actual amateur career.

In his first professional fight, Washington knocked out Blue DeLong at the HP Pavilion in San Jose, California. A month later in August, Washington defeated Gary Cobia via 1st-round TKO at the Fantasy Springs Casino in California. Washington's first decision win came in his 3rd professional fight against Terrance Perro. Perro was knocked down once in round 1, after 4 rounds the scorecards were 40–34, 39–35, and 39–35 in favor of Washington.

On June 8, 2013, Washington fought 40 year old veteran Sherman Williams (35–12–2, 19 KOs) to an 8-round unanimous decision victory at the Home Depot Center in Carson, California. Since 2005, Williams had only lost two of his last thirteen fights. The three judges all had it 79–72 in favour for Washington. In April 2014, Washington scored a 2nd-round knockout of fellow American Skipp Scott (16–1, 10 KOs). There was controversy after the fight as Scott took a knee, but was hit with a body shot after he was on the canvas. The stoppage was at 1 minute, 40 seconds of round two. Due to the controversy, Scott's team filed a protest to correct the decision.

Washington fought veteran journeyman Travis Walker (39–11–1, 31 KOs) in June 2014. The fight ended when Washington stopped Walker in round 2, following some hard power shots. Walker had trouble getting back up and the referee waved the fight off. Two months later, Washington was taken the 8-round distance for the first time when he fought 28 year old Nagy Aguilera (19–8, 13 KOs). Washington won on the scorecards 78–74, 78–74, and 77–75.

Washington next fought in December 2014 against 39 year old journeyman Mike Sheppard (22–17–1, 9 KOs) at the Pechanga Resort & Casino in Temecula, California. The fight lasted just 1 minute and 26 seconds as Washington dropped Sheppard twice.

On March 13, 2015 Washington went the 8 round distance, winning a wide decision of 78–71, 79–70, and 79–70, against 37 year old journeyman Jason Gavern (26–18–4, 11 KOs). The fight took place at the Citizens Business Bank Arena in Ontario, California on the undercard of Andre Berto vs. Josesito Lopez interim welterweight title fight. Gavern was dropped three times in the fight.

=== Rise up the ranks ===
==== Washington vs. Mansour ====
In September 2015, it was announced that Washington would fight heavyweight contender Amir Mansour (22–1, 16 KOs) at the Little Creek Casino Resort in Shelton, Washington. Washington had his best win to date in March 2015 when he beat longtime veteran Jason Gavern in a 10-round decision victory. The fight took place on October 13, 2015. The fight was to take place on Premier Boxing Champions on Fox Sports 1 from the Little Creek Casino Resort, in Shelton, Washington.

In a controversial decision, Washington and Mansour fought to a 10-round draw. The final judges' scores were 97–93 for Washington, 96–94 for Mansour, and 95–95. Washington looked to be fading after round 4, he previously had a reputation of being gassed out after 5 rounds in previous fights. Washington appeared to lose the last 6 rounds of the fight due to his running, holding and low punch output. Washington was mostly just holding and running away from Mansour from rounds 5 to 10. Mansour was able to land a lot of body shots that clearly bothered Washington and him holding on and doing a lot of shoving. The crowd loudly booed the outcome.

==== Washington vs. Chambers ====
On February 2, 2016 a fight between Washington and rising Colombian prospect Óscar Rivas (18–0, 13 KOs) was set to take place at the Honda Center in Anaheim, California on February 27 on Showtime. Two days before the fight, the California State Athletic Commission conducted an eye exam, which Rivas failed. The scheduled 10-round bout was cancelled.

On April 6, it was announced that Washington would fight former world title challenger Eddie Chambers (42–4, 23 KOs) on April 30 at the StubHub Center, Carson, California. it was scheduled to be a 10-round bout, but this changed to 8 rounds. Washington threw three times the amount of punches and used his big size advantage to beat Chambers by an 8-round unanimous decision. The final judges' scores were 79–73, 80–72, and 80–72.

==== Washington vs. Austin ====
On July 11, it was announced that Washington would fight 47 year old American Ray Austin (29–7–4, 18 KOs) on the undercard of Wilder–Arreola on July 16, 2016 at the Legacy Arena in Birmingham, Alabama. Washington delivered by stopping veteran Austin in round 4 via knockout. Washington unloaded a flurry of punches followed by a straight right which put Austin flat on his back.

=== WBC heavyweight title challenge ===
==== Washington vs. Wilder ====
On January 26, 2017, Washington became a front runner to land a fight against WBC heavyweight champion Deontay Wilder (37–0, 36 KOs) at the Legacy Arena in Birmingham, Alabama, on February 25 on Fox. This came after Wilder's original opponent for the fight, Polish boxer Andrzej Wawrzyk, tested positive for stanozolol, an anabolic steroid, during testing for the WBC's Clean Boxing Program. The fight was officially confirmed on January 30, 2017. Washington released a statement following the announcement, "I'm very happy to get this opportunity to fight for my first world championship. I know that I'll be fighting Deontay Wilder in his backyard, but that adds more excitement ... I'm looking forward to going to Birmingham and coming away with a victory just like I did in my last fight there."

Wilder would win the bout by TKO in the 5th round. Washington started off strong with power punches as Wilder moved around with jabs. Midway through the 5th, Wilder got Washington against the ropes and landed a combination of power shots, the last shot being a left to the head of Washington, dropping him backwards against the ropes. Washington recovered quickly on unsteady legs. The fight resumed, and Wilder unloaded heavy blows the head of Washington, missing some, but eventually leading referee Michael Griffin to halt the fight at 1 minute and 45 seconds of the round. Washington attributed his loss due to lack of experience, saying after the fight, "I just got a little impatient. I was trying to go for it. It was an even boxing match. I could have kept it like that and kept it boring. I don't know why I fell asleep there. I guess I lost a little focus."

Washington earned $250,000 from the fight while Wilder earned $900,000. The fight was watched by an average audience of 1.76 million viewers, peaking at 1.86 million. The bout was the most watched boxing match in the United States for 2017 until the Thurman-Garcia unification fight drew 3.74 million on March 4.

=== Career from 2017–2020 ===
==== Washington vs. Miller ====
On June 27, it was announced that Washington would fight unbeaten heavyweight contender Jarrell Miller (18–0–1, 16 KOs) on the undercard of Garcia-Broner at the Barclays Center in New York on July 29, 2017 in a 10-round bout. Miller weighed in a career high 298.8 pounds and Washington weighed 248 pounds, 9 pounds heavier than when he challenged Wilder for the WBC title in February 2017. After the weigh in, the face off was tense as Miller trash-talking to Washington, who never did any trash-talking back. Miller then threw his promotional cap towards Washington as the face off was broken up. Miller broke down Washington over 8 rounds eventually forcing the corner and referee stopping the fight. Washington had a good opening round, but Miller took control landing power shots and causing heavy punishment. By the end of the fight, both fighters looked tired. Washington suffered his second consecutive stoppage loss and Miller fought for the first time in 11 months. Stephen Espinoza, Showtime Sports general manager praised Miller and said he could soon feature on 'Showtime Championship Boxing' soon. Miller had a $70,000 purse for the win, while Washington earned $50,000.

After 11 months out, Washington returned to the ring on a Sunday edition of PBC on Fox Sports 1 on June 10, 2018. His opponent was 32 year old John Wesley Nofire (20–1, 16 KOs). His only loss came to veteran journeyman Joey Abell in 2016. The fight took place at the Pioneer Event Center in Lancaster, California. The 10-round bout was mostly back and forth. Washington started off fast, landing big shots and applying pressure on Nofire. In round 3, Nofire landed some hard shots on Washington, however he recovered and took over, landing his own big shots. Nofire slowed down after landing his big shots. Washington remained in control for most of the fight. The three judges scored the bout 98–91, 97–92, and 97–92 in favor of Washington, giving him the much needed win and snapping his 2-fight losing streak.

==== Washington vs. Kownacki ====
On November 13, 2018 it was announced that Washington, who was at the time negotiating a possible fight with British heavyweight Joe Joyce, would fight on January 26, 2019 at the Barclays Center in New York against Polish-born, Brooklyn-based Adam Kownacki (18–0, 14 KOs). The fight would air live on FOX, as part of their new long term deal with PBC, on the undercard of Keith Thurman vs. Josesito Lopez. Washington lost by TKO in the second round.

==== Washington vs Helenius ====
On July 13, 2019, Washington fought Robert Helenius. The fight was competitive, as both fighters were throwing and taking a lot of punches. In the eighth round, Washington caught Helenius with a long right hand, sending him straight to the canvas. The referee immediately waved the fight off, and Washington was awarded the KO victory over Helenius.

==== Washington vs Martin ====
On the undercard of Deontay Wilder vs. Tyson Fury II on February 22, 2020, Washington, ranked #9 by the IBF at heavyweight, fought former world champion Charles Martin, who was ranked #11 by the IBF at the time. Washington was knocked down by Martin in the second round and despite beating the count, the referee decided he was not fit to continue, awarding Martin the sixth round TKO win.

== Outside of boxing ==
On September 16, 2014 Washington was arrested during a routine traffic stop. The arrest took place in Burbank, California. According to some sources, Washington was pulled over because his Chevrolet truck was 'straddling the lines' and also had expired tags. Washington fully cooperated with the police and was not under the influence. However the police noticed that there was a warrant for his arrest for previously driving without a licence. A bail of $5,000 was set after Washington was taken into custody.

== Professional boxing record ==
29 fights	21 wins	7 losses
By knockout	14	6
By decision	7	1
Draws	1	

No.	Result	Record	Opponent	Type	Round, time	Date	Location	Notes
29	Loss	21–7–1	Kingsley Ibeh	TKO	2 (10), 0:26	Sep 20, 2025	Gimnasio Nacional José Adolfo Pineda, San Salvador, El Salvador	For vacant WBC FECARBOX heavyweight title
28	Win	21–6–1	Carlos Cardenas	TKO	3 (8), 0:10	Mar 28, 2025	Mazatlán, Mexico	
27	Loss	20–6–1	Derek Chisora	UD	10	Aug 12, 2023	The O2 Arena, London, England	
26	Loss	20–5–1	Ali Eren Demirezen	TKO	8 (10), 2:07	Jan 1, 2022	Seminole Hard Rock Hotel and Casino, Hollywood, Florida, U.S.	
25	Loss	20–4–1	Charles Martin	TKO	6 (12), 1:57	Feb 22, 2020	MGM Grand Garden Arena, Paradise, Nevada, U.S.	
24	Win	20–3–1	Robert Helenius	KO	8 (10), 2:32	Jul 13, 2019	Minneapolis Armory, Minneapolis, Minnesota, U.S.	
23	Loss	19–3–1	Adam Kownacki	TKO	2 (10), 1:09	Jan 26, 2019	Barclays Center, New York City, New York, U.S.	
22	Win	19–2–1	John Wesley Nofire	UD	10	Jun 10, 2018	Pioneer Event Center, Lancaster, California, U.S.	
21	Loss	18–2–1	Jarrell Miller	RTD	8 (10), 3:00	Jul 29, 2017	Barclays Center, New York City, New York, U.S.	
20	Loss	18–1–1	Deontay Wilder	TKO	5 (12), 1:45	Feb 25, 2017	Legacy Arena, Birmingham, Alabama, U.S.	For WBC heavyweight title
19	Win	18–0–1	Ray Austin	KO	4 (10), 1:45	Jul 16, 2016	Legacy Arena, Birmingham, Alabama, U.S.	
18	Win	17–0–1	Eddie Chambers	UD	8	Apr 30, 2016	StubHub Center, Carson, California, U.S.	
17	Draw	16–0–1	Amir Mansour	SD	10	Oct 13, 2015	Little Creek Casino Resort, Shelton, Washington, U.S.	
16	Win	16–0	Jason Gavern	UD	8	Mar 13, 2015	Citizens Business Bank Arena, Ontario, California, U.S.	
15	Win	15–0	Mike Sheppard	KO	1 (8), 1:26	Dec 11, 2014	Pechanga Resort & Casino, Temecula, California, U.S.	
14	Win	14–0	Nagy Aguilera	UD	8	Aug 22, 2014	Sports Center, Fairfield, California, U.S.	
13	Win	13–0	Travis Walker	TKO	2 (8), 0:31	Jun 27, 2014	Hard Rock Hotel & Casino, Paradise, Nevada, U.S.	
12	Win	12–0	Skipp Scott	KO	2 (10), 1:40	Apr 3, 2014	Fantasy Springs Resort Casino, Indio, California, U.S.	
11	Win	11–0	Arron Lyons	TKO	5 (8), 0:50	Jan 24, 2014	Fantasy Springs Resort Casino, Indio, California, U.S.	
10	Win	10–0	Travis Fulton	TKO	1 (8), 2:20	Oct 19, 2013	Deportivo Morelos, Mexico City, Mexico	
9	Win	9–0	Jerry Forrest	KO	2 (8), 1:32	Aug 9, 2013	Fantasy Springs Resort Casino, Indio, California, U.S.	
8	Win	8–0	Sherman Williams	UD	8	Jun 8, 2013	Home Depot Center, Carson, California, U.S.	
7	Win	7–0	Curtis Harper	KO	5 (6), 0:39	Mar 8, 2013	Fantasy Springs Resort Casino, Indio, California, U.S.	
6	Win	6–0	DJ Hughley	UD	4	Jan 11, 2013	Fantasy Springs Resort Casino, Indio, California, U.S.	
5	Win	5–0	Marcus Washington	KO	1 (4), 0:23	Dec 8, 2012	Business Expo Center, Anaheim, California, U.S.	
4	Win	4–0	Brandon Spencer	KO	3 (4), 0:21	Nov 3, 2012	Phoenix Club, Anaheim, California, U.S.	
3	Win	3–0	Terrance Perro	UD	4	Sep 29, 2012	Fantasy Springs Resort Casino, Indio, California, U.S.	
2	Win	2–0	Gary Cobia	TKO	1 (4), 1:22	Aug 24, 2012	Fantasy Springs Resort Casino, Indio, California, U.S.	
1	Win	1–0	Eldon DeLong	TKO	1 (4), 2:36	Jul 28, 2012	HP Pavilion, San Jose, California, U.S.	
