= Otto Wallin =

Swedish boxer (born 1990)

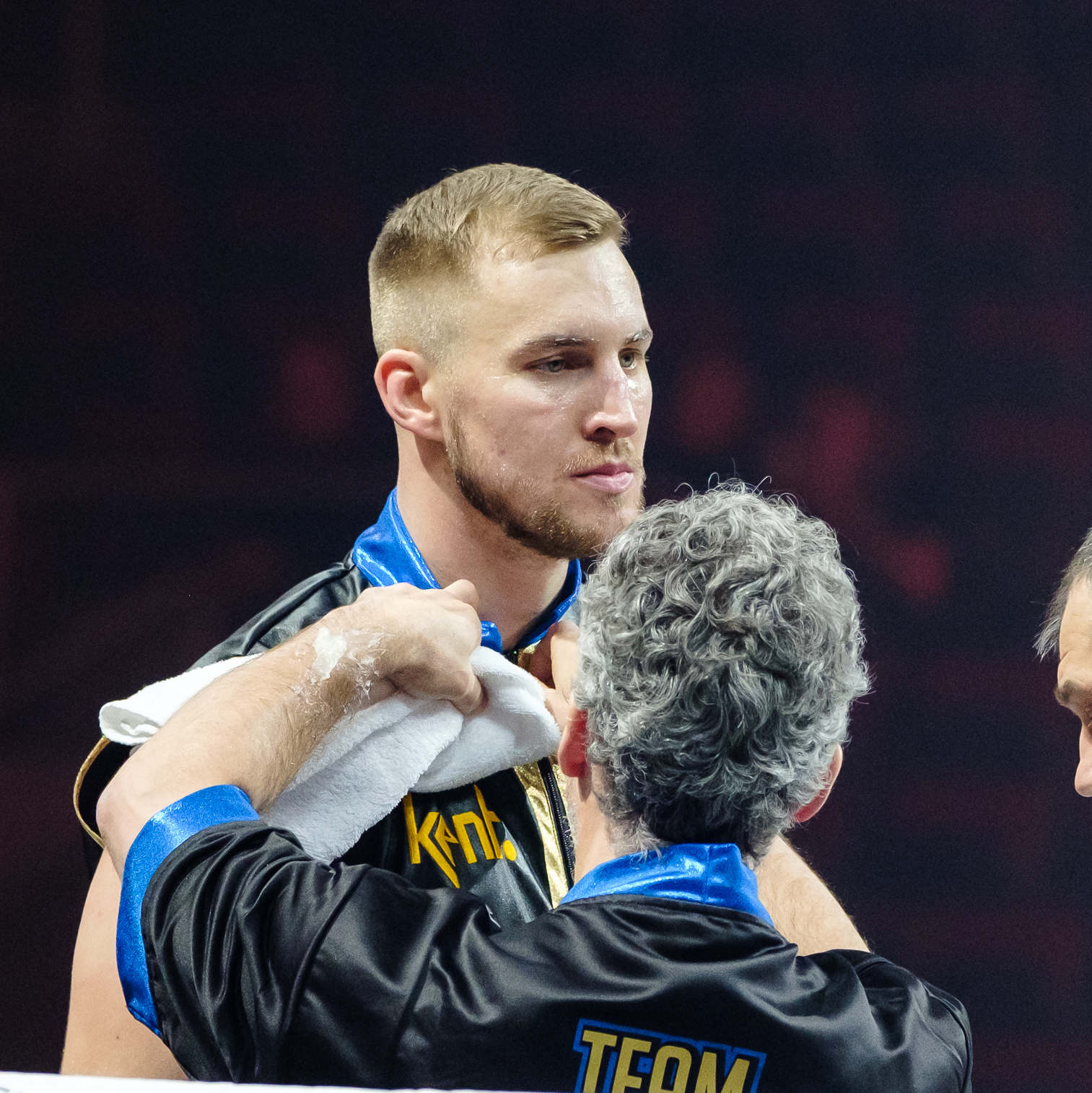

Personal information
- Nickname: "All In"
- Born: Einar Otto Wallin; 21 November 1990 (age 35) Sundsvall, Sweden
- Height: 1.97 m (6 ft 5 1/2 in)
- Weight: Heavyweight

Boxing career
- Reach: 198 cm (78 in)
- Stance: Southpaw

Boxing record
- Total fights: 32
- Wins: 28
- Win by KO: 16
- Losses: 4
- No contests: 1
Medal record
Gee-Bee Tournament
Bronze medal – third place	2012 Helsinki	Super-heavyweight
Riga Open Tournament
Gold medal – first place	2011 Riga	Super-heavyweight
Algirdas Socikas Tournament
Gold medal – first place	2011 Kaunas	Super-heavyweight
Nordic Championships
Silver medal – second place	2011 Lahti	Super-heavyweight
Haringey Box Cup
Silver medal – second place	2010 London	Super-heavyweight
Gold medal – first place	2011 London	Super-heavyweight
Swedish National Championships
Silver medal – second place	2010 Norrköping	Super-heavyweight
Bronze medal – third place	2011 Sundsvall	Super-heavyweight
Ruska Tournament
Gold medal – first place	2009 Rovaniemi	Super-heavyweight
Silver medal – second place	2010 Rovaniemi	Super-heavyweight
Swedish Youth National Championships
Bronze medal – third place	2009 Nyköping	Heavyweight

Einar Otto Wallin (born 21 November 1990) is a Swedish professional boxer. At regional level, he has held multiple heavyweight championships, including the Swedish title in 2018. He holds a notable win over world heavyweight champion Murat Gassiev.

== Amateur career ==
Wallin comes from a working-class family. His father and one of his brothers boxed, and he began boxing when he was 15. As an amateur, he won the Swedish championship for beginners in 2008. There were few heavyweights available to fight in Sweden, where professional boxing was banned until 2007, so Wallin would often fight whoever and whenever in order to stay active.

In 2009, Wallin won a bronze medal at the Swedish Youth National Championships in the heavyweight division, and won the Ruska Tournament in the super-heavyweight division. In 2010, Wallin won silver at the Swedish National Championships, and silver at the Haringey Box Cup, losing to Anthony Joshua on points in the final. He also won silver at the 2010 Ruska Tournament.

Wallin lost to Joshua on points again in a Sweden–England dual match in Stockholm in January 2011. He then won bronze at the Swedish National Championships in February, silver at the Nordic Championships in March, gold at the Algirdas Socikas Tournament in May, gold at the Haringey Box Cup in June, and gold at the Riga Open Tournament in December.

In January 2012, Wallin defeated Frazer Clarke 32:11 in a Sweden–England dual match in Uppsala, which qualified him for the 2012 European Boxing Olympic Qualification Tournament. Wallin won bronze at the Gee-Bee Tournament in March, losing to Magomed Omarov in the semi-finals. At the European Boxing Olympic Qualification Tournament in April in Trabzon, Turkey, he was eliminated in the round of 16 by Mihai Nistor. Wallin finished with an amateur record of 34–12.

== Professional career ==
=== Early career ===
Wallin turned professional at the age of 22, in 2013. He trained under Torsten Schmitz for six months in Berlin, Germany, then moved to Copenhagen, Denmark, where he met former two-weight WBA world champion Joey Gamache, who became his trainer. Wallin followed Gamache to New York after Gamache left Denmark.

=== Rise up the ranks ===
==== Wallin vs. Granat ====
After racking up a 19–0 record and winning the WBA Continental heavyweight title, Wallin defeated Adrian Granat (15–1, 14 KOs) to win the vacant Swedish and EBU European Union heavyweight titles in April 2018. Wallin won by unanimous decision 117–111, 117–112, and 118–110. As a tall southpaw, he has also been a sparring partner for Anthony Joshua, Jarrell Miller and Adam Kownacki.

==== Wallin vs. Kisner ====
Wallin then made his United States debut against Nick Kisner (21–4–1, 6 KOs) in April 2019, but the fight ended in a no contest after an accidental clash of heads opened a cut above Kisner's eye in the first round. He was set to fight BJ Flores (34–4–1, 21 KOs) in July, but Flores was ruled medically unfit to fight on the day of the scheduled bout.

==== Wallin vs. Fury ====
On 14 September 2019, Wallin faced the former unified heavyweight world champion Tyson Fury (28–0–1, 20 KOs) at the T-Mobile Arena in Las Vegas. Wallin lost the fight by unanimous decision, with the scorecards reading 116–112, 117–111, and 118–110. He opened up a large cut above Fury's right eye in the third round with a left hand, which affected Fury's vision for the rest of the fight. A ringside doctor examined the cut in the sixth and deemed Fury able to continue. The examination by the doctor seemed to motivate Fury, as he poured on the pressure afterwards, hurting Wallin repeatedly with solid shots. Despite fatiguing in the second half of the fight, Wallin came back in the twelfth and landed a strong left hand which seemed to trouble Fury. Commentators stated Wallin's performance had defied the odds despite the loss, as he came in as an over 10 to 1 underdog.

=== Career from 2020 ===
==== Wallin vs. Kauffman ====
Wallin was set to make his return to the ring against former WBA (Regular) heavyweight world champion Lucas Browne (29–2, 25 KOs) on 28 March 2020 at the Park Theater at the Park MGM in Las Vegas. The fight was scheduled for 10 rounds. On 26 February, Wallin was removed from the card due to a foot injury and was replaced by Apti Davtaev. He instead made his return against Travis Kauffman (32–3–0, 23 KOs) on 15 August 2020. Wallin dominated the fight, and Kauffman retired in the fifth round due to injury.

==== Wallin vs. Breazeale ====
Wallin's next fight was against former IBF and WBC title challenger Dominic Breazeale (20–2–0, 18 KOs) on the undercard of Adrien Broner vs. Jovanie Santiago on 20 February 2021. The Swede was in control the whole fight and regularly found the target with his straight left hand, causing swelling around Breazeale's right eye. Wallin won a comfortable unanimous decision victory with scores of 117–111, 118–110 and 116–112.

On 15 September 2021, it was reported that terms had been agreed between Wallin and the WBC interim heavyweight champion, Dillian Whyte (28–2, 19 KOs), for a bout on 30 October at the O_{2} Arena in London, England. However, ten days before the fight was scheduled to occur, Whyte withdrew due to reportedly suffering a shoulder injury.

After the fight against Whyte fell through, Wallin was left without an opponent. He next returned to the ring in February 2022, in a late-notice bout against Polish journeyman Kamil Sokołowski (11–24–2, 4 KOs). Wallin defeated Sokołowski on points, then faced Rydell Booker (26–5–1, 13 KOs) on 26 May 2022 in Booker's home state of Michigan, easing to a decision victory. Wallin had another "stay-busy" fight against Mexican heavyweight Helaman Olguin (9–4–1, 4 KOs) in January 2023. He recorded a decision win, improving his record to 25–1.

==== Wallin vs. Gassiev ====
On 12 September 2023, it was announced that Wallin would face Murat Gassiev (30–1, 23 KOs), former IBF and WBA world cruiserweight champion, in a fight where the WBA Intercontinental heavyweight belt was at stake. The bout took place in Antalya, Turkey on 30 September. Wallin was the busier of the two boxers, and won by split decision. Two judges scored it 115–113 for Wallin, while the third saw it 117–111 for Gassiev. The 117–111 scorecard for Gassiev was classed as "questionable" by media outlet Bad Left Hook. Wallin was the betting underdog against Gassiev, whose only prior loss had been against Oleksandr Usyk, and the victory was described as the biggest of Wallin's career to date.

==== Wallin vs. Joshua ====
On 15 November 2023, it was announced that Wallin would face former unified WBA, IBF, WBO heavyweight champion Anthony Joshua (26–3, 23 KOs) on 23 December 2023. The fight took place at Riyadh's Kingdom Arena in Saudi Arabia. Wallin found himself perpetually on the defensive, unable to penetrate Joshua's formidable jab and right hand, which effectively neutralized his offensive capabilities. The duel turned decisively in round 5 when Joshua unleashed a devastating punch that sent Wallin reeling backward, but Wallin displayed remarkable resilience, hanging on until the end of the round. Before the start of round 6, Wallin's coach Gamache made the decision to stop the fight, resulting in a corner retirement win for Joshua.

==== Wallin vs. Chisora ====
On 27 November 2024, Wallin was announced as a step in to fight Derek Chisora (35–13, 23 KOs) at Co-op Live in Manchester. Wallin, who was promoted by Salita, was given the opportunity after Jarrel Miller was dropped, due to promotional issues. The pair went face-to-face at a press conference the next day. The fight was billed was 'The Last Dance', hinting Chisora's retirement. Chisora had recently said he wanted to have 50 professional fights. The fight with Wallin would be his 49th in the pro ranks. Wallin said he was there to win, "I'm here to fight and here to win and that's all. I don't worry so much about The Last Dance and all that, this is my time. You're gonna get stopped." Chisora responded, "There's nothing you've got that I haven't tasted in my life. I don't believe you've got the power to bother me. Even the biggest punchers have not bothered me, so, you know, don't worry, I've got fear of you but it gives me that motivation to train harder. I'm definitely going to come for you." Lead promoter Frank Warren said the winner would be locked in to a big fight later in the year.

Wallin received a call from his manager Jolene Mizzone, the day after his birthday, to offer him the fight. He called it a belated birthday gift. The fight was scheduled for 10 rounds. During the final press conference, Chisora said, "I'm buzzing for this fight. It's going to be one exciting fight, I can tell you that now. Do not sit down because we're going to drown this guy. We're going to go hard. I know for a fact he hasn't trained the way I expect him to train for me, so I'm excited. I just want to fight." Chisora explained he was told to retire from boxing after 50 fights. Had he not been told, he could have 'gone to 100'. The press conference was billed as Chisora's final in the UK. Chisora weighed in at 259.7 pounds, 20 pounds heavier than Wallin, who came in at 239.1 pounds. During the face-off, Chisora jokingly put Wallin in a headlock and security had to break it up.

In front of 13,000 in attendance, Wallin was defeated by Chisora via unanimous decision. He was knocked down in the 9th and 12th rounds in the IBF title eliminator contest. In the opening round, Chisora fought on the inside attacking Wallin's body. It was more of the same in the next round until Wallin landed several left uppercuts on Chisora. He gained Wallin's attention in round 4 following a number of overhand rights. By round 5, Wallin was holding on. An accidental head clash caused a nasty cut between the right eye and eyebrow of Chisora. Referee John Latham sent Chisora to the ringside doctor to be examined a few times for the remainder of the fight, but was allowed to finish the fight. Chisora tired himself out in round 8, when he threw a 30–punch combination, however not all were clean punches and not all landed, but Wallin was hurt from this. The first knockdown occurred in round 9 when Chisora landed a right hand. Wallin stumbled back a few stops and lost his footing, ending up staggering backwards across the ring, onto the canvas. Another right hand to the head dropped Wallin again to close the final round. The judges' scorecards read 117–109, 114–112 and 116–110 for Chisora. Many felt the fight was not close. Fans took to social media to call out judge Bence Kovac of Hungary, for his 114–112 card. Had Chisora not scored the two knockdowns, his card would have been scored a draw, although the result would still have been an overall majority decision win for Chisora.

==== Wallin vs. Thomas ====
Wallin regained some momentum after his recent loss, stopping Chris Thomas in the second round. The fight took place at the Tropicana Hotel and Casino in Atlantic City, New Jersey on 7 November 2025. The knockout occurred at the 1-minute mark. It was a left hand to the body that ended the fight. The fight marked Wallin's debut under new trainer Ronnie Shields.

=== Zuffa Boxing ===
On 9 April 2026, Wallin announced that he had signed a promotional contract with Zuffa Boxing. He credited their busy calendar schedule as one of the reasons for joining them, as it would keep him more active and consistent. He called out fellow Zuffa heavyweight Efe Ajagba for a fight.

==== Wallin vs. Sirenko ====
Wallin made his Zuffa Boxing debut against Vladyslav Sirenko at The Theater at Madison Square Garden in New York City, on 26 July 2026. He was knocked out in the last second of the 10th and final round. Wallin required medical attention in the ring and was taken back to the dressing rooms on a stretcher before being transported to hospital.

== Personal life ==
Wallin was born in Sundsvall, Sweden, but has lived in New York City since 2017. Wallin's father died of a sudden heart attack shortly before the announcement of Wallin's fight with Tyson Fury. Wallin said his father, an amateur boxer and part-time trainer, motivated him to get into boxing, and hoped to use his father's death as extra motivation to upset the odds and defeat Fury, similar to Buster Douglas's losing his mother before fighting Mike Tyson. Despite ultimately losing the bout, Wallin's performance was praised. Fury said in his in-ring interview, "Big congratulations to Otto and I just wanna say rest in peace to his father. I know he would be very, very proud of his performance." Wallin has a YouTube channel.

== Professional boxing record ==
33 fights	28 wins	4 losses
By knockout	16	2
By decision	12	2
No contests	1	

No.	Result	Record	Opponent	Type	Round, time	Date	Location	Notes
33	Loss	28–4 (1)	Vladyslav Sirenko	KO	10 (10), 2:59	26 Jul 2026	The Theater at Madison Square Garden, New York City, New York, US	
32	Win	28–3 (1)	Chris Thomas	KO	2 (8), 1:00	7 Nov 2025	Tropicana Hotel, Atlantic City, New Jersey, US	
31	Loss	27–3 (1)	Derek Chisora	UD	12	8 Feb 2025	Co-op Live, Manchester, England	
30	Win	27–2 (1)	Onoriode Ehwarieme	KO	1 (8), 0:48	26 Jul 2024	Tropicana Hotel, Atlantic City, New Jersey, US	
29	Loss	26–2 (1)	Anthony Joshua	RTD	5 (12), 3:00	23 Dec 2023	Kingdom Arena, Riyadh, Saudi Arabia	
28	Win	26–1 (1)	Murat Gassiev	SD	12	30 Sep 2023	Regnum Carya Hotel, Antalya, Turkey	Won WBA Inter-Continental heavyweight title
27	Win	25–1 (1)	Helaman Olguin	UD	8	27 Jan 2023	Castleton Banquet & Conference Center, Windham, New Hampshire, US	
26	Win	24–1 (1)	Rydell Booker	UD	10	26 May 2022	Ford Community Center, Dearborn, Michigan, US	
25	Win	23–1 (1)	Kamil Sokołowski	PTS	8	5 Feb 2022	Motorpoint Arena, Cardiff, Wales	
24	Win	22–1 (1)	Dominic Breazeale	UD	12	20 Feb 2021	Mohegan Sun Arena, Montville, Connecticut, US	
23	Win	21–1 (1)	Travis Kauffman	TKO	5 (10), 2:32	15 Aug 2020	Mohegan Sun Arena, Montville, Connecticut, US	
22	Loss	20–1 (1)	Tyson Fury	UD	12	14 Sep 2019	T-Mobile Arena, Paradise, Nevada, US	
21	NC	20–0 (1)	Nick Kisner	NC	1 (10), 3:00	13 Apr 2019	Boardwalk Hall, Atlantic City, New Jersey, US	No contest after Kisner cut from accidental headbutt
20	Win	20–0	Adrian Granat	UD	12	21 Apr 2018	Gärdehov, Sundsvall, Sweden	Won vacant European Union and Swedish heavyweight titles
19	Win	19–0	Srđan Govedarica	KO	3 (8), 1:01	27 Jan 2018	Arēna Rīga, Rīga, Latvia	
18	Win	18–0	Gianluca Mandras	TKO	5 (10), 1:18	22 Apr 2017	Sundsvalls Sporthall, Sundsvall, Sweden	Won vacant WBA Continental heavyweight title
17	Win	17–0	Raphael Zumbano	UD	10	3 Dec 2016	Arena Armeec, Sofia, Bulgaria	
16	Win	16–0	Osborne Machimana	UD	8	10 Sep 2016	Hovet, Stockholm, Sweden	
15	Win	15–0	Irineu Beato Costa Junior	TKO	3 (8), 0:35	23 Apr 2016	Hovet, Stockholm, Sweden	
14	Win	14–0	Samir Kurtagic	UD	6	19 Dec 2015	Rosvalla Arena, Nyköping, Sweden	
13	Win	13–0	Vladimir Goncharov	UD	6	19 Sep 2015	Rosvalla Arena, Nyköping, Sweden	
12	Win	12–0	Oleksiy Mazikin	KO	2 (8), 2:26	20 Jun 2015	Super Arena, Ballerup, Denmark	
11	Win	11–0	Beka Lobjanidze	KO	4 (8), 0:52	2 May 2015	Frederiksberghallen, Copenhagen, Denmark	
10	Win	10–0	David Gegeshidze	TKO	2 (8), 2:32	14 Mar 2015	Super Arena, Ballerup, Denmark	
9	Win	9–0	Ivica Perkovic	RTD	4 (8), 3:00	6 Dec 2014	Große EWE Arena, Oldenburg, Germany	
8	Win	8–0	Vjekoslav Bajic	TKO	2 (8)	29 Nov 2014	Falkoner Center, Frederiksberg, Denmark	
7	Win	7–0	Maksym Pedyura	TKO	4 (6), 2:50	30 Aug 2014	Gerry Weber Stadion, Halle, Germany	
6	Win	6–0	Ladislav Kovarik	TKO	4 (4), 1:00	15 Feb 2014	MusikTeatret, Albertslund, Denmark	
5	Win	5–0	Ferenc Zsalek	PTS	4	25 Jan 2014	Hanns-Martin-Schleyer-Halle, Stuttgart, Germany	
4	Win	4–0	Tomas Mrazek	PTS	4	23 Nov 2013	Stechert Arena, Bamberg, Germany	
3	Win	3–0	Gabor Farkas	TKO	3 (4), 2:53	26 Oct 2013	EWE Arena, Oldenburg, Germany	
2	Win	2–0	Valeri Semiskur	TKO	2 (4), 0:55	7 Sep 2013	Arena Nord, Frederikshavn, Denmark	
1	Win	1–0	Roman Cherney	KO	1 (4), 2:57	15 Jun 2013	NRGi Arena, Aarhus, Denmark	

== Pay-per-view bouts ==
No.	Date	Fight	Country	Network
1	14 September 2019	Tyson Fury vs. Otto Wallin	United Kingdom, Ireland	BT Sport Box Office
2	23 December 2023	Anthony Joshua vs. Otto Wallin	United Kingdom, Ireland	TNT Sports Box Office
2	23 December 2023	Anthony Joshua vs. Otto Wallin	Worldwide	DAZN

Sporting positions
Regional boxing titles
Vacant Title last held by Ruslan Chagaev	WBA Continental (Europe) heavyweight champion 22 April 2017 – June 2017; Vacated	Vacant Title next held by Alexander Povetkin
Vacant Title last held by Agit Kabayel	European Union heavyweight champion 21 April 2018 – March 2021; Vacated	Vacant Title next held by Tony Yoka
Vacant Title last held by Olle Tandberg	Swedish heavyweight champion 21 April 2018 – ? Vacated	Vacant
Vacant Title last held by Murat Gassiev	WBA Inter-Continental heavyweight champion 30 September 2023 – October 2023; Vacated	Vacant Title next held by Arslanbek Makhmudov
