= Robert Helenius =

Finnish boxer (born 1984)

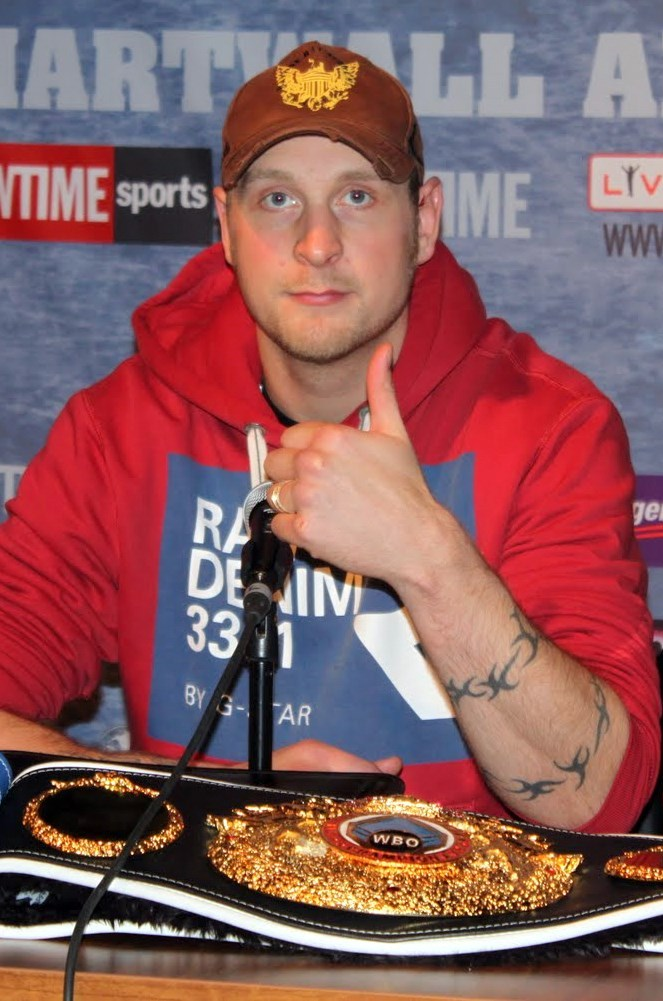
- Helenius in 2010

Personal information
- Nickname: The Nordic Nightmare
- Nationality: Finnish; Swedish
- Born: Robert Gabriel Helenius; 2 January 1984 (age 42) Stockholm, Sweden
- Height: 2.00 m (6 ft 6 1/2 in)
- Weight: Heavyweight

Boxing career
- Reach: 201 cm (79 in)
- Stance: Orthodox

Boxing record
- Total fights: 37
- Wins: 32
- Win by KO: 21
- Losses: 5
Medal record
Men's amateur boxing
Representing Finland
European Championships
Silver medal – second place	2006 Plovdiv	Super-heavyweight
EU Junior Championships
Bronze medal – third place	2001 Sarajevo	Super-heavyweight
European Cadet Championships
Bronze medal – third place	2000 Athens	Super-heavyweight
Finnish National Championships
Gold medal – first place	2007 Kuortane	Super-heavyweight
Gold medal – first place	2005 Lahti	Super-heavyweight
Gold medal – first place	2004 Helsinki	Super-heavyweight
Gold medal – first place	2003 Tampere	Super-heavyweight
Silver medal – second place	2002 Helsinki	Super-heavyweight

Robert Gabriel Helenius (born 2 January 1984) is a Finnish former professional boxer who competed from 2008 to 2023. At regional level, he held multiple heavyweight championships, including the European title twice between 2011 and 2016. As an amateur, he won a silver medal at the 2006 European Championships. He holds notable wins over former world heavyweight champions Lamon Brewster, Samuel Peter, and Siarhei Liakhovich.

== Amateur career ==
Helenius began training boxing under his father at the age of five. In the early 2000s, Tony Halme was one of Helenius' first sparring and training partners. Helenius won the bronze medal in 2000 at the European "cadets" (U 17) championships in Patras; he lost to Croatian Mario Preskar. In 2001 at the Junior European Championships in Sarajevo he earned another bronze, losing to hard-hitting Russian Islam Timurziev.

At the 2001 Finnish Amateur Boxing Championships, in the super heavyweight division, Helenius lost to eventual gold medallist Janne Katajisto in the first round. The following year, Katajisto defeated Helenius in the final.

In 2005 at Mianyang Helenius beat David Price on points but then lost to Rustam Saidov.

2006, however, was his breakthrough year. At the 2006 European Amateur Boxing Championships in Plovdiv he finished second, again beaten by Timurziev, this time on points. By this time all of Helenius's victories had come by knockout including versus Bogdan Dinu.

Since 2006 Helenius had been fighting in Germany in the Box-Bundesliga (Premier League) for Hertha BSC. Promoter Sauerland-Boxstall had bought an option in case Helenius turned pro after the Olympics. At the Olympic qualifiers he lost to Marko Tomasović and Jaroslavas Jakšto. Helenius also faced MMA heavyweight fighter Sergei Kharitonov in the amateurs, beating him by points.

== Professional career ==
Helenius turned pro in 2008 to fight for Germany's Wilfried Sauerland. In 2009 Helenius knocked out former British heavyweight champion Scott Gammer and defeated Taras Bidenko with a third round stoppage.

=== Rise up the ranks ===
==== Helenius vs. Brewster ====
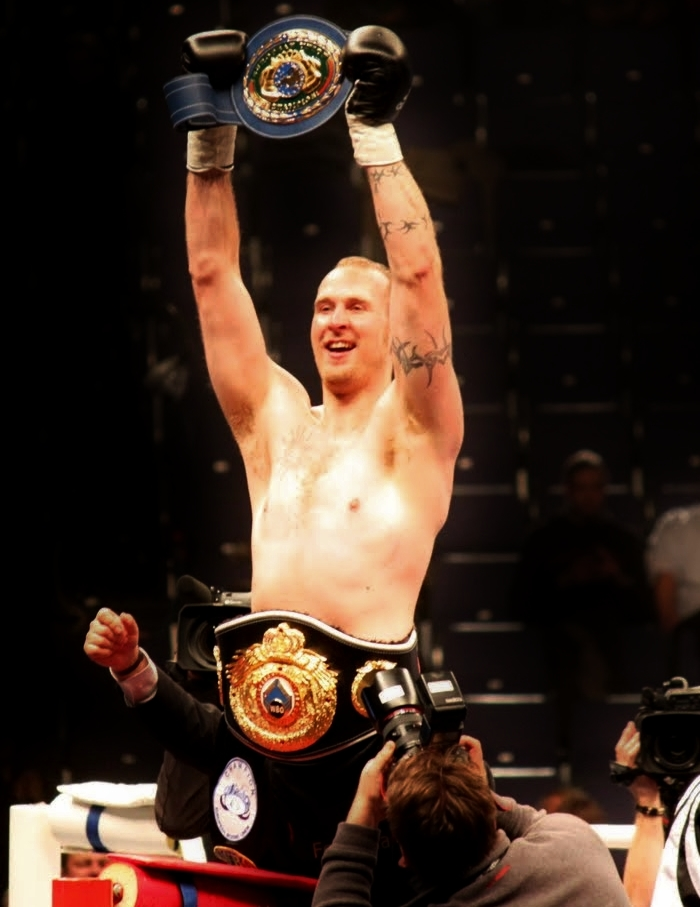
Robert Helenius in 2010

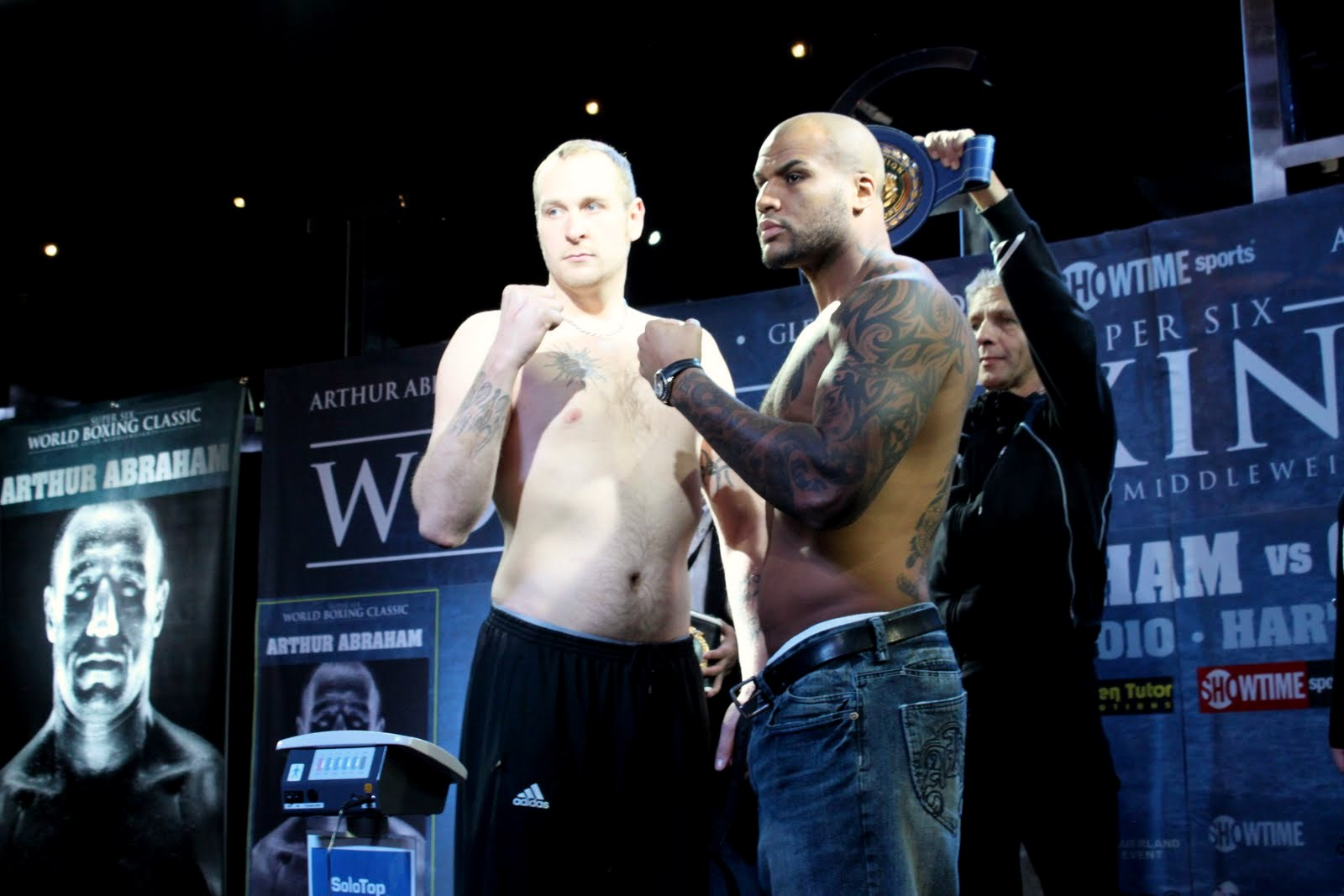
Robert Helenius and Attila Levin

In January 2010 Helenius made the biggest step up so far of his professional career in squaring off against former WBO heavyweight champion Lamon Brewster. Many commentators wondered if the Brewster fight had come too early for the big Finn, however Helenius proved his toughness and punching power by grinding Brewster down to score a TKO in the eighth round. Helenius went on to defeat Gbenga Oloukun on 26 March 2010 in Helsinki, despite breaking a bone next to the knuckles of his right hand.

In August 2010 Helenius won the vacant EU heavyweight title against unbeaten Grégory Tony. Helenius defended his title for the first time on 27 November 2010 by beating Attila Levin with a technical knockout in the second round. In the same match he also won the vacant WBO Inter-Continental title.

==== Helenius vs. Peter ====
Trying to build on the momentum of his big win over Lamon Brewster, Helenius signed to fight another former world heavyweight champion in Samuel Peter. Peter was coming off a 10th-round knockout loss to unified heavyweight champion Wladimir Klitschko in their marquee rematch bout. The fight took place on 2 April 2011. Peter started the bout aggressively working behind a consistent body and head attack. However, Helenius weathered the storm and soon began to find the mark with his trademark right hand in the middle rounds. As the bout headed into the 9th the score cards were divided, nevertheless Helenius ended matters scoring a knockout leaving Peter out cold on the canvas for well over the 10 second count.

==== Helenius vs. Liakhovich ====
On 27 August 2011 Helenius successfully defended his WBO and WBA Inter-Continental titles against Sergei Liakhovich in Munich, Germany, by technical knockout in round 9. It was Helenius' third knockout victory against former heavyweight champions and further cemented his position as one of the world's top ranked heavyweights.

=== First reign as European champion ===
==== Helenius vs. Chisora ====
On 3 December 2011, Helenius won the vacant European Championship title (EBU) by beating Derek Chisora by a twelve-round split decision in Helsinki, Finland. The decision was highly debated as most pundits and onlookers thought Chisora had done enough to get the decision. In the Finnish press Helenius claimed he had injured his right arm in the first round of the match, and was thus unable to use it fully. A fracture was found, but it was considered to be minor. The result was widely criticized by the crowd and pundits with Freddie Roach who was commentating the fight labelling it "just terrible" and added 'Helenius was supposed to be the next big thing and the man to challenge the Klitschko's, but Derek totally exposed him and I'm being generous in giving him four winning rounds in the fight'.

The Ring considered the outcome of the match "a gift", dropping Helenius' ranking from fifth to sixth challenger. On the other hand, his slugger fighting style has been described as lazy but powerful; he looks to be not doing much, but keeps putting men down.

The injury required an operation and to achieve complete healing and to minimize any possibility of further injury, a long break from fights. After a year away from boxing, Helenius beat veteran Sherman "The Caribbean Tank" Williams on points on 10 November 2012 in Helsinki keeping his clean record. The fight was the main event on the only Sauerland Events Viasat Nordic Fight Night card so far held outside of Denmark. On 23 March 2013 in Magdeburg, Germany, Helenius won his match against Michael Sprott on points in 10-round match. Helenius broke his right hand wrist in fight.

Due to contract disputes with Team Sauerland, Helenius was inactive for two years, before breaking off the contract with Sauerland in February 2015. Sauerland did not accept the one-sided break of contract and took the issue to the court.

=== Return to the ring ===
Helenius returned to the ring on 21 March 2015 in Tallinn, when he faced Andras Csomor. On 13 June 2015 Helenius fought against Georgian champion Beka Lobjanidze at Vaasa, Finland. Lobjanidze stood no chance and went to floor in every round before retiring from the fight during the third.

=== Second reign as European champion ===
==== Helenius vs. Rill ====
On 19 December 2015, Helenius was supposed to face Erkan Teper for the EBU heavyweight title, but Teper since cancelled the match and had to give up his title due an injury. With Teper pulling out Helenius was matched with replacement opponent undefeated Franz Rill the bout would contest the EBU European heavyweight title vacated by Teper as well as the IBF international heavyweight title. Helenius scored a clear and decisive 12 round unanimous decision; Rill was aggressive but Helenius dominated proceedings with his jab and powerful counter punching sending his opponent to the canvas in both the first and fourth rounds.

=== 2016–2018 ===
==== Helenius vs. Duhaupas ====
On 20 January 2016, Helenius vacated the European belt after refusing to fight mandatory challenger Derek Chisora. Instead, Helenius faced Johann Duhaupas for the vacant WBC Silver Heavyweight title on 2 April in Helsinki. The match ended with Duhaupas knocking Helenius out in the sixth round marking the first loss for previously undefeated Helenius.

On 10 September 2016, Helenius faced German boxer Konstantin Airich in his home town Marienhamn. This was his first fight after the knockout defeat against Duhaupas. Helenius finished the match in the first round knocking Airich out after 49 seconds.

In October 2016, Helenius and Sauerland announced that they had come in terms with their contract dispute from 2015 and would organize at least two more matches together.

On 17 December 2016, Helenius beat Argentinian Gonzalo Basile in 48 seconds in a lackluster scrab at Hartwall Arena, Helsinki.

On 24 March 2017, it was announced that Helenius would get a much awaited rematch against Derek Chisora at the Hartwall Arena in Helsinki, Finland. The same arena they fought at when Helenius won a controversial split decision in December 2011. The bout would have contested for the vacant WBC Silver heavyweight title on 27 May 2017. On 16 May, the fight was however postponed to take place after summer 2017. After the Chisora rematch was postponed, Helenius went on to face Russian Evgeny Orlov on 17 June 2017 and gained easy victory in the sixth round.

==== Helenius vs. Whyte ====
On 15 October 2017, it was announced that Helenius would face Dillian Whyte on 28 October, after Whyte had difficulty finding an opponent. Whyte controlled the match from the third round on and eventually won by a twelve-round unanimous decision. Helenius commented afterwards that he knew the risks for accepting the match on such fast notice and with only a week of training, but took the risk in a need for money.

On 17 March 2018, Helenius faced Yury Bykhautsou in Rakvere, Estonia. Helenius got injured during the match, but ended up winning by an 8-round split decision. Disappointed with his performance during the match, Helenius negotiated a rematch with Bykhautsou for 11 August 2018 in Olavinlinna. Rematch ended with Helenius landing another victory, this time by a unanimous decision.

==== Helenius vs. Teper ====
On 29 September 2018, Helenius faced Erkan Teper for the vacant IBF Inter-Continental heavyweight title. The bout consisted of Helenius controlling most of the fight before knocking out Teper in round 8.

=== 2019–2021 ===
==== Helenius vs. Washington ====
After almost a year away from the ring, Helenius made his first appearance in the United States, facing Gerald Washington on 13 July 2019. He lost the bout via knockout in the eighth round.

On 30 November 2019, Helenius faced Mateus Roberto Osorio in Narva, Estonia. After dropping Osorio in the end of the first round, Helenius went on to knock him out via a body punch in the second round.

==== Helenius vs. Kownacki ====
On 7 March 2020, Helenius squared off against undefeated Adam Kownacki in a WBA title eliminator. While Kownacki was the heavy favorite, Helenius pulled off a significant upset by stopping Kownacki in the fourth round winning the vacant WBA Gold heavyweight title in the process. The victory lined up Helenius as the mandatory challenger for titlist Anthony Joshua. However, Joshua was already set to fight Kubrat Pulev and Kownacki exercised his contractual rematch clause.

==== Helenius vs. Kownacki II ====
According to Helenius' manager, the rematch was postponed several times due to various reasons and ultimately after over a year out of the ring, Helenius returned on 9 October 2021 on the main card of Tyson Fury vs. Deontay Wilder III, against Adam Kownacki. The bout was stopped after six rounds of dominance by Helenius against a clearly overpowered Kownacki. The former had inflicted his opponent with a swollen left eye, before suffering repeated low blows, which caused Kownacki to be disqualified in the sixth round. After the bout, the result was later changed to a technical knockout victory for Helenius.

=== 2022–2024 ===
==== Helenius vs. Wilder ====
Helenius then faced former WBC heavyweight world champion Deontay Wilder with the fight scheduled to occur on 15 October 2022, at Brooklyn's Barclays Center. He lost the bout by first-round knockout.

==== Helenius vs. Joshua ====
On 6 July 2023, Dillian Whyte vs. Anthony Joshua II, a rematch of the 12 December 2015 bout was announced to be held at The O2 Arena in London. This was cancelled on 5 August 2023, after Whyte returned a positive drug test conducted by the voluntary anti-doping agency. On 8 August 2023, Helenius was announced as the replacement for Whyte, with the bout taking place on the originally scheduled date of 12 August 2023. Helenius lost the bout by knockout in the seventh round.

=== Doping ban ===
Helenius was given a two-year ban by UK Anti-Doping (UKAD) on 19 July 2024 after failing a drug test following his fight with Anthony Joshua. He tested positive for clomifene, although the boxer denied intentional doping and blamed the consumption of contaminated egg and chicken. The ban was backdated to when he was first provisionally suspended meaning he would be eligible to fight again on 18 September 2025.

=== Retirement ===
After serving the two-year ban, on 20 September 2025, Helenius announced his retirement from boxing in an interview with the Finnish newspaper Uusimaa, stating "I've noticed that I can no longer find the inspiration in myself to train hard twice a day." He expressed interest in pursuing a career as head coach of the Nordic Nightmare Boxing Club in Porvoo, Finland. However, he hinted at a possible return to the ring, saying "I'm never saying never. If a really good offer comes in for an interesting match, we'll look at it from that perspective."

== Personal life ==
Helenius was born in Stockholm, Sweden, and he lived in Sweden until the age of two. He holds both Finnish and Swedish citizenship, and has represented Sweden in a few matches after having a dispute with the Finnish boxing association. Helenius is a Swedish-speaking Finn. Today, Helenius lives in Lumparland municipality in Åland.

== Professional boxing record ==
37 fights	32 wins	5 losses
By knockout	21	4
By decision	11	1

No.	Result	Record	Opponent	Type	Round, time	Date	Location	Notes
37	Loss	32–5	Anthony Joshua	KO	7 (12), 1:27	12 Aug 2023	The O2 Arena, London, England	
36	Win	32–4	Mika Mielonen	TKO	3 (8), 1:51	5 Aug 2023	Olavinlinna, Savonlinna, Finland	
35	Loss	31–4	Deontay Wilder	KO	1 (12), 2:57	15 Oct 2022	Barclays Center, New York City, New York, U.S.	
34	Win	31–3	Adam Kownacki	TKO	6 (12), 2:38	9 Oct 2021	T-Mobile Arena, Paradise, Nevada, US	Originally DQ for low blows by Kownacki, later ruled TKO
33	Win	30–3	Adam Kownacki	TKO	4 (12), 1:08	7 Mar 2020	Barclays Center, New York City, New York, US	Won vacant WBA Gold heavyweight title
32	Win	29–3	Mateus Roberto Osorio	TKO	2 (8), 2:02	30 Nov 2019	Vaba Lava, Narva, Estonia	
31	Loss	28–3	Gerald Washington	KO	8 (10), 2:32	13 Jul 2019	Minneapolis Armory, Minneapolis, Minnesota, US	
30	Win	28–2	Erkan Teper	KO	8 (12), 3:00	29 Sep 2018	Ritter-Sport-Stadion, Waldenbuch, Germany	Won vacant IBF Inter-Continental heavyweight title
29	Win	27–2	Yury Bykhautsou	UD	6	11 Aug 2018	Olavinlinna, Savonlinna, Finland	
28	Win	26–2	Yury Bykhautsou	SD	8	17 Mar 2018	Rakvere Spordikeskus, Rakvere, Estonia	
27	Loss	25–2	Dillian Whyte	UD	12	28 Oct 2017	Principality Stadium, Cardiff, Wales	For vacant WBC Silver heavyweight title
26	Win	25–1	Evgeny Orlov	RTD	6 (10), 3:00	17 Jun 2017	Kalev, Tallinn, Estonia	Won vacant WBC International Silver heavyweight title
25	Win	24–1	Gonzalo Basile	TKO	1 (12), 0:48	17 Dec 2016	Hartwall Arena, Helsinki, Finland	
24	Win	23–1	Konstantin Airich	KO	1 (8), 0:49	10 Sep 2016	Baltichallen, Mariehamn, Finland	
23	Loss	22–1	Johann Duhaupas	KO	6 (12), 3:00	2 Apr 2016	Hartwall Arena, Helsinki, Finland	For vacant WBC Silver heavyweight title
22	Win	22–0	Franz Rill	UD	12	19 Dec 2015	Hartwall Arena, Helsinki, Finland	Won vacant IBF International and European heavyweight titles
21	Win	21–0	Beka Lobjanidze	KO	3 (8), 0:47	13 Jun 2015	Vaasa Arena, Vaasa, Finland	
20	Win	20–0	András Csomor	TKO	1 (6), 1:02	21 Mar 2015	Tondiraba Ice Hall, Tallinn, Estonia	
19	Win	19–0	Michael Sprott	UD	10	23 Mar 2013	GETEC Arena, Magdeburg, Germany	
18	Win	18–0	Sherman Williams	UD	10	10 Nov 2012	Ice Hall, Helsinki, Finland	
17	Win	17–0	Derek Chisora	SD	12	3 Dec 2011	Hartwall Arena, Helsinki, Finland	Retained WBA Inter-Continental and WBO Inter-Continental heavyweight titles; Won vacant European heavyweight title
16	Win	16–0	Siarhei Liakhovich	TKO	9 (12), 0:19	27 Aug 2011	Messehalle, Erfurt, Germany	Retained WBA Inter-Continental and WBO Inter-Continental heavyweight titles
15	Win	15–0	Samuel Peter	KO	9 (12), 1:50	2 Apr 2011	Gerry Weber Stadion, Halle, Germany	Retained WBO Inter-Continental heavyweight title; Won vacant WBA Inter-Continental heavyweight title
14	Win	14–0	Attila Levin	TKO	2 (12), 1:20	27 Nov 2010	Hartwall Arena, Helsinki, Finland	Retained European Union heavyweight title; Won vacant WBO Inter-Continental heavyweight title
13	Win	13–0	Grégory Tony	TKO	6 (12), 0:39	21 Aug 2010	Messehalle, Erfurt, Germany	Won vacant European Union heavyweight title
12	Win	12–0	Gbenga Oloukun	UD	8	26 Mar 2010	Töölön Kisahalli, Helsinki, Finland	
11	Win	11–0	Lamon Brewster	TKO	8 (10), 2:31	30 Jan 2010	Jahnsportforum, Neubrandenburg, Germany	
10	Win	10–0	Taras Bidenko	RTD	3 (8), 3:00	7 Nov 2009	Arena Nürnberger Versicherung, Nuremberg, Germany	
9	Win	9–0	Serdar Uysal	KO	6 (8), 2:37	29 Aug 2009	Gerry Weber Stadion, Halle, Germany	
8	Win	8–0	Scott Gammer	KO	6 (8), 1:52	30 May 2009	Hartwall Arena, Helsinki, Finland	
7	Win	7–0	Özcan Çetinkaya	TKO	2 (8), 1:36	9 May 2009	JAKO Arena, Bamberg, Germany	
6	Win	6–0	Enrico Garmendia	TKO	1 (6), 2:13	28 Feb 2009	Jahnsportforum, Neubrandenburg, Germany	
5	Win	5–0	Remigijus Ziausys	UD	6	28 Nov 2008	Hartwall Arena, Helsinki, Finland	
4	Win	4–0	Nikola Vujasinovic	UD	4	8 Nov 2008	JAKO Arena, Bamberg, Germany	
3	Win	3–0	Engin Solmaz	UD	4	5 Sep 2008	Nöjesfabriken, Karlstad, Sweden	
2	Win	2–0	David Vicena	UD	4	7 Jun 2008	Mellringehallen, Örebro, Sweden	
1	Win	1–0	Gene Pukall	TKO	1 (4), 2:41	17 May 2008	Oberfrankenhalle, Bayreuth, Germany	

== Viewership ==
=== Germany ===
Date	Fight	Viewership (avg.)	Network	Source(s)
2 April 2011	Robert Helenius vs. Samuel Peter	2,550,000	Das Erste	
27 August 2011	Robert Helenius vs. Siarhei Liakhovich	1,910,000	Das Erste	
3 December 2011	Robert Helenius vs. Derek Chisora	3,160,000	Das Erste	
23 March 2013	Robert Helenius vs. Michael Sprott	2,080,000	Das Erste	
	Total viewership	18,100,000		

=== Pay-per-view bouts ===
Date	Fight	Pay-per-view buys	Country	Network	Source(s)
3 December 2011	Robert Helenius vs. Derek Chisora	20,000	Finland	MTV Katsomo	
15 October 2022	Deontay Wilder vs. Robert Helenius	75,000	United States	Fox Sports	
	Total sales	95,000			

Sporting positions
Regional boxing titles
Vacant Title last held by Francesco Pianeta	European Union heavyweight champion 21 August 2010 – April 2011; Vacated	Vacant Title next held by Richard Towers
Vacant Title last held by Alexander Dimitrenko	WBO Inter-Continental heavyweight champion 27 November 2010 – July 2012; Vacated	Vacant Title next held by Tyson Fury
Vacant Title last held by Denis Boytsov	WBA Inter-Continental heavyweight champion 2 April 2011 – July 2012; Vacated	Vacant Title next held by David Haye
Vacant Title last held by Alexander Dimitrenko	European heavyweight champion 3 December 2011 – May 2012; Vacated	Vacant Title next held by Kubrat Pulev
Vacant Title last held by Erkan Teper stripped	European heavyweight champion 19 December 2015 – April 2016; Vacated	Vacant Title next held by Kubrat Pulev
Vacant Title last held by Artur Szpilka	IBF International heavyweight champion 19 December 2015 – April 2016; Vacated	Vacant Title next held by Franz Rill
Vacant Title last held by Andriy Rudenko	WBC International Silver heavyweight champion 17 June 2017 – November 2017; Vacated	Vacant Title next held by Nathan Gorman
Vacant Title last held by Carlos Takam	IBF Inter-Continental heavyweight champion 29 September 2018 – March 2020; Vacated	Vacant Title next held by Demsey McKean
Vacant Title last held by Joe Joyce	WBA Gold heavyweight champion 7 March 2020 – October 2022; Vacated	Vacant Title next held by Michael Hunter
