= ESPN PPV =

Television series

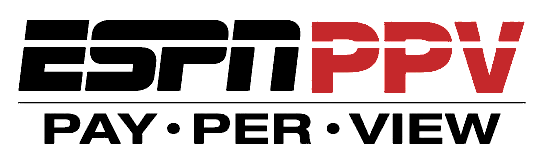
- Country: United States
- Availability: National
- Owner: The Walt Disney Company (72%; via ABC Inc.); Hearst Communications (18%); National Football League (10%)
- Parent: ESPN, LLC
- Launch date: 1999
- Picture format: 480i (SDTV)

ESPN PPV is the banner for pay-per-view events produced by ESPN. The service primarily serves as the distributor for ESPN College Extra, an out-of-market sports package that carries college basketball and football events. The service was originally launched in 1999 as ESPN Extra SkyREPORT.COM News and was renamed ESPN PPV in 2001.

== History ==
In March 2005, the unit broadcast its first boxing PPV, headlined by Shane Mosley vs. David Estrada. ESPN's contract with the promoter Top Rank since 2017 includes the possibility of PPV events. In January 2019, ESPN announced its first Top Rank PPV, between Terence Crawford and Amir Khan for the WBO Welterweight title.

== Collaboration ==
Although ESPN had preferred to use its subscription streaming service ESPN+ for larger fights not on linear TV, Bob Arum stated that the fight's scale was too large to be covered by rights fees alone. In December 2019, it was announced that ESPN would jointly produce the Deontay Wilder vs. Tyson Fury II PPV with Fox Sports.
