= Sherman Williams (boxer) =

Bahamian boxer (born 1972)

Personal information
- Nicknames: The Caribbean Tank; Tank
- Born: Sherman Alexander Williams; September 1, 1972 (age 54) Freeport, Bahamas
- Height: 5 ft 11 in (1.80 m)
- Weight: Heavyweight

Boxing career
- Reach: 76 in (193 cm)
- Stance: Orthodox

Boxing record
- Total fights: 58
- Wins: 40
- Win by KO: 22
- Losses: 15
- Draws: 2
- No contests: 1

Sherman Alexander Williams (born September 1, 1972) is a Bahamian former professional boxer who competed from 1997 to 2018.

== Professional career ==
Williams' first notable win after turning pro in 1997 came in 1999 when he won against the previously unbeaten Frank Wood in two rounds. In 2000, he fought against Jameel McCline in a match that ended in a 10-round draw. He followed this up with a six round decision against Cisse Salif. He won the WBA FEDECARIBE Heavyweight title on December 6, 2003. Two years later, Williams won the WBC CABOFE on December 5, 2005, defeating Willie Perryman in the undercard match of the Winky Wright/Sam Soliman Middleweight bout. This was followed by the NBA Heavyweight title on March 31, 2006. On July 28, Williams defeated Josh Gutcher 71 seconds into the first round. Upon his return to the Bahamas Williams made his eight consecutive victory on April 18, 2007, defeating Wade Lewis with a first round KO.

On January 22, 2011 Williams fought against Evander Holyfield at The Greenbrier in White Sulphur Springs, West Virginia. Holyfield started the bout slowly and in the second round, he was cut in the left eye following an accidental clash of heads. In round three as he took several combinations. After the end of the round, Holyfield told his corner that he was unable to see due to the cut. Consequently, the bout was ruled a no contest.

In 2012, he pulled off an upset win over Chauncy Welliver, before losing to Robert Helenius. In June 2013, he was outpointed by Gerald Washington.

== Professional boxing record ==
58 fights	40 wins	15 losses
By knockout	22	1
By decision	18	14
Draws	2	
No contests	1	

Result	Record	Opponent	Type	Round	Date	Location	Notes
Win	40-15-2; 1 NC	(Colombia) Epifanio Mendoza	TKO	3 (10)	26/05/2018	(The Bahamas) A Social Affair and Convention Center, Freeport, Bahamas	
Win	39-15-2; 1 NC	(Brazil) Mateus Roberto Osorio	KO	1 (8)	03/12/2016	(Denmark) Ceres Arena, Aarhus, Germany	
Win	38-15-2; 1 NC	(United States) Jamal Woods	UD	6	23/04/2016	(United States) Police Athletic League, Elizabeth City	
Loss	37-15-2; 1 NC	(Romania) Christian Hammer	UD	10	28/08/2015	Pationoarul Dunarea, Galați, Romania	
Win	37-14-2; 1 NC	(Colombia) Manuel Banquez	KO	1 (6)	05/12/2014	Kendal Isaacs Gym, New Providence, The Bahamas	
Loss	36-14-2; 1 NC	(New Zealand) Joseph Parker	UD	10	16/10/2014	The Trusts Arena, Auckland, New Zealand	For the WBO Oriental & PABA heavyweight titles.
Win	36-13-2; 1 NC	(United States) Earl Ladson	UD	4	22/11/2013	(United States) The Ritz, Raleigh, North Carolina, U.S.	
Loss	35-13-2; 1 NC	(United States) Gerald Washington	UD	8	08/06/2013	(United States) StubHub Center, Carson, California, U.S.	
Loss	35-12-2; 1 NC	(Finland) Robert Helenius	UD	10	10/11/2012	Ice Hall, Helsinki, Finland	
Win	35-11-2; 1 NC	(New Zealand) Chauncy Welliver	MD	12	28/06/2012	Grand Waldo Conference & Exhibition Centre, Cotai, Macau	Won WBO China Zone and WBO Asia Pacific heavyweight titles.
NC	34-11-2; 1 NC	(United States) Evander Holyfield	NC	3 (12)	22/01/2011	(United States) The Greenbrier, White Sulphur Springs, West Virginia, U.S.	For WBF Heavyweight title. Fight stopped due to Holyfield's left eye being cut as a result of an accidental clash of heads in the 2nd round.
Loss	34-11-2	(Syria) Mahmoud Charr	UD	10	10/10/2009	Stadthalle, Rostock, Germany	
Win	34-10-2	(United States) Andrew Greeley	UD	6	12/12/2008	(United States) Bourbon Street Station, Jacksonville, Florida, U.S.	
Win	33-10-2	(United States) Wade Lewis	KO	1 (10)	18/04/2007	(The Bahamas) Clifford Park, Nassau, Bahamas	
Win	32-10-2	(United States) Ralph West	KO	3 (12)	19/01/2007	(United States) Knox Arena, Olive Branch, Mississippi, U.S.	Won vacant NBA and WBF Intercontinental Heavyweight titles.
Win	31-10-2	(United States) Josh Gutcher	TKO	1 (12)	04/08/2006	(United States) Knox Arena, Las Vegas, Nevada, U.S.	Retained WBC Caribbean Boxing Federation (CABOFE) Heavyweight title & NBA Heavyweight title.
Win	30-10-2	(United States) Earl Ladson	UD	6	05/05/2006	(United States) Ybor City Multi Fight Complex, Tampa, Florida, U.S.	
Win	29-10-2	(United States) David Washington	KO	3 (12)	31/03/2006	(United States) Multi Fight Complex, Tampa, Florida, U.S.	Won NBA Heavyweight title.
Win	28-10-2	(United States) Dennis McKinney	UD	4	24/02/2006	(United States) Dover Downs, Dover, Delaware, U.S.	
Win	27-10-2	(United States) Willie Perryman	UD	10	10/12/2005	(United States) Mohegan Sun Casino, Uncasville, Connecticut, U.S.	Won WBC Caribbean Boxing Federation (CABOFE) Heavyweight title.
Win	26-10-2	(United States) Harold Sconiers	UD	6	15/10/2005	(United States) UCF Arena, Kissimmee, Florida, U.S.	
Loss	25-10-2	(Uzbekistan) Ruslan Chagaev	UD	8	26/03/2005	Erdgas Arena, Riesa, Germany	
Draw	25-9-2	(Mexico) Gilbert Martinez	PTS	10	14/11/2004	(United States) HP Pavilion, San Jose, California, U.S.	
Win	25-9-1	(United States) Leon Turner	TKO	5 (6)	12/06/2004	(The Bahamas) Kendal G L Isaacs National Gym, Nassau, Bahamas	
Loss	24-9-1	(United States) Kelvin Hale	SD	8	06/03/2004	(United States) Turning Stone Casino, Verona, New York, U.S.	
Win	24-8-1	(Puerto Rico) Miguel Otero	TKO	4 (12)	06/12/2003	(The Bahamas) National Gymnasium, Nassau, Bahamas	Won vacant WBA FEDECARIBE Heavyweight title.
Loss	23-8-1	(United States) Tye Fields	UD	12	02/09/2003	(United States) Mountaineer Casino Racetrack & Resort, Chester, West Virginia, U.S.	Won vacant USBA Heavyweight title.
Win	23-7-1	(United States) Lenzie Morgan	UD	6	03/07/2003	(United States) Mountaineer Casino Racetrack & Resort, Chester, West Virginia, U.S.	
Win	22-7-1	(United States) Gabe Brown	UD	10	Mar 1, 2003	(United States) Thomas & Mack Center, Las Vegas, Nevada, U.S.	
Win	21-7-1	(United States) Garing Lane	UD	6	06/12/2002	(United States) Arena Boxing Gym, St. Petersburg, Florida, U.S.	
Loss	20-7-1	(United States) Taurus Sykes	UD	10	20/10/2002	(United States) Emerald Queen Casino, Tacoma, Washington, U.S.	
Win	20-6-1	(Tonga) Samson Po'uha	MD	10	21/04/2002	(United States) Flamingo Hilton, Laughlin, Nevada, U.S.	
Win	19-6-1	(United States) Al Cole	UD	10	26 Jan 2002	(United States) MSG Theater, New York, New York, U.S.	
Loss	18-6-1	(United States) Obed Sullivan	SD	10	20/05/2001	(United States) Belterra Casino Resort, Elizabeth, Indiana, U.S.	Won vacant NABF Heavyweight title.
Win	18-5-1	(Mali) Cisse Salif	UD	6	02/11/2000	(United States) Bethlehem, Pennsylvania, U.S.	ThunderBox Fight.
Draw	17-5-1	(United States) Jameel McCline	PTS	10	29/06/2000	(United States) Hammerstein Ballroom, New York, New York, U.S.	
Win	17–5	Crawford Dennary	KO	1 (10)	08/04/2000	(The Bahamas) Nassau, Bahamas	
Win	16–5	(United States) Ron Guerrero	UD	10	31/03/2000	(United States) Hammerstein Ballroom, New York, New York, U.S.	
Loss	15–5	(United States) Derrick Banks	PTS	10	18/11/1999	(United States) Spotlight 29 Casino, Coachella, California, U.S.	
Loss	15–4	(United States) Tommy Martin	UD	10	29/10/1999	Molson Centre, Montreal, Quebec, Canada	
Win	15–3	(United States) Charles Cue	KO	1 (10)	11/09/1999	(The Bahamas) Nassau, Bahamas	
Win	14–3	(United States) Frank Wood	TKO	2 (8)	05/08/1999	(United States) Grand Casino, Tunica, Mississippi, U.S.	
Loss	13–3	(United States) Robert Davis	TKO	5 (8)	20/05/1999	(United States) Grand Casino, Tunica, Mississippi, U.S.	
Win	13–2	(United States) Andrew Staley	PTS	6	25/03/1999	(United States) St. Petersburg Coliseum, St. Petersburg, Florida, U.S.	
Win	12–2	(Puerto Rico) Miguel Otero	UD	6	24/02/1999	(United States) Four Ambassadors Hotel, Miami, Florida, U.S.	
Win	11–2	(United States) Isaac Poole	TKO	1 (4)	30/01/1999	(United States) Flagler Dog Track, Miami, Florida, U.S.	
Win	10–2	(United States) Ronald Lewis	TKO	1 (6)	05/12/1998	(United States) Mahi Temple Shrine Auditorium, Miami, Florida, U.S.	
Win	9–2	(United States) Willie Driver	KO	1 (4)	13/11/1998	(United States) Egypt Shrine Temple, Tampa, Florida, U.S.	
Win	8–2	(United States) Floyd Womack	TKO	2 (4)	03/11/1998	(United States) Mahi Temple Shrine Auditorium, Miami, Florida, U.S.	
Win	7–2	(United States) Harry Daniels	KO	1 (4)	15/09/1998	(United States) Charlotte County Auditorium, Punta Gorda, Florida, U.S.	
Win	6–2	(United States) Derrick Edwards	UD	4	08/08/1998	(United States) Mahi Temple Shrine Auditorium, Miami, Florida, U.S.	
Win	5–2	(United States) Robert Williams	KO	1 (4)	27/06/1998	(United States) North River Gym, Miami, Florida, U.S.	
Win	4–2	(United States) Sean Rickards	TKO	1 (4)	09/05/1998	(United States) Mahi Temple Shrine Auditorium, Miami, Florida, U.S.	
Win	3–2	(United States) Vale Payton	TKO	1 (4)	11/04/1998	(United States) Mahi Temple Shrine Auditorium, Miami, Florida, U.S.	
Win	2–2	(United States) Tracy Williams	KO	1 (4)	28/03/1998	(United States) PAL Gymnasium, Homestead, Florida, U.S.	
Loss	1–2	(United States) Renard Jones	UD	6	26/11/1997	(United States) Arizona Charlie's, Las Vegas, Nevada, U.S.	
Win	1–1	(Venezuela) Alex Desir	TKO	2 (4)	30/07/1997	(United States) Arizona Charlie's, Las Vegas, Nevada, U.S.	
Loss	0–1	(United States) Renard Jones	MD	4	24/06/1997	(United States) Arizona Charlie's, Las Vegas, Nevada, U.S.	
