= Adam Kownacki =

Polish boxer (born 1989)

Personal information
- Nickname: Babyface
- Born: 27 March 1989 (age 37) Łomża, Poland
- Height: 1.91 m (6 ft 3 in)
- Weight: Heavyweight; Bridgerweight

Boxing career
- Reach: 193 cm (76 in)
- Stance: Orthodox

Boxing record
- Total fights: 26
- Wins: 21
- Win by KO: 15
- Losses: 4
- No contests: 1

Adam Kownacki (born 27 March 1989) is a Polish professional boxer.

== Early life ==
Kownacki was born in Łomża, Poland and grew up in Konarzyce. When he was seven years old, he emigrated to Greenpoint, Brooklyn in 1996 along with his parents and brothers, settling into the large Polish community there. As a youngster, he played a variety of sports, including basketball, baseball, football and soccer. He graduated from Abraham Lincoln High School in Brooklyn in 2007.

He grew up watching Andrew Golota fights, which got him interested in boxing. As an overweight youngster who spoke English with a Polish accent, he was frequently the target of bullies at school and on the streets, which gave him further motivation to enter the boxing gym. Early in his boxing career, Kownacki had to work in construction and security in nightclubs to support himself.

== Amateur career ==
Kownacki started training at Gleason's Gym at the age of 15. He first won the New York Golden Gloves heavyweight tournament in 2006 at the age of 17. He then went on to be the runner up in 2007 and 2008, then won the tournament for the second time in 2009.

== Professional career ==
=== Early career ===
Kownacki made his professional debut on 30 October 2009, at the PAL Gym in New York, United States, where he knocked out Carossee Auponte in the first round. His first fight of 2010 was against Tyyab Beale, which he won by knockout in the second round. He went on to fight twice more in 2010, knocking out Yohan Banks and Damon Clement. He fought once in 2013, beating Calbert Lewis by knockout in the second round. Kownacki next fought on 29 March 2014, against Excell Holmes, who he knocked out in the second round. Kownacki went on to get knockout wins against Charles Ellis and Jamal Woods to finish off the year.

His first fight of 2015 was against Randy Easton, who he knocked out in the first round. His next fight took place on 29 May, where he beat Ytalo Perea by unanimous decision over 8 rounds, the first time he had gone the distance in his professional career. His next fight was against Maurenzo Smith on 1 August, at the Barclays Center, New York. He knocked Maurenzo out in the second round. His last fight of 2015 was a unanimous decision win over Rodney Hernandez. Kownacki fought twice in 2016, with a unanimous decision over Danny Kelly and a knockout win against Jesse Barboza. He then went on to face Joshua Tufte on 14 January 2017, who he knocked out in the second round.

=== Rise up the ranks ===
On 15 July 2017 at the Nassau Coliseum in New York, he faced former world title challenger Artur Szpilka. Szpilka represented Kownacki's toughest opponent to date. He knocked out Szpilka in the 4th round.

Kownacki's first fight of 2018 was against Iago Kiladze, at the Barclays Center, New York, on the undercard of Errol Spence Jr. vs Lamont Peterson. He won the fight by knockout in the sixth round. On 8 September 2018 he faced former IBF heavyweight world champion Charles Martin. After a close ten round fight, Kownacki won by unanimous decision with all judges scoring the bout 96–94 in favor of Kownacki. The bout was a part of the undercard for Danny García vs Shawn Porter at the Barclays Center, New York.

On 26 January 2019 Kownacki faced Gerald Washington. Kownacki was ranked #5 by the IBF and #8 by the WBC. Kownacki knocked out Washington at the beginning of 2nd round.

In his second bout of 2019, on 3 August at the Barclays Center, New York, Kownacki defeated Chris Arreola by unanimous decision (118–110, 117–111, 117–111), winning the IBF Inter-Continental heavyweight title. The fight broke the CompuBox record for the most combined punches thrown (2,172) and landed (667) in a heavyweight fight.

==== Kownacki vs. Helenius ====
On 7 March 2020, Kownacki faced Robert Helenius in a WBA title eliminator. Kownacki was ranked #3 by the IBF, #4 by the WBA and the WBO and #6 by the WBC, while Helenius was ranked #7 by the WBA. While Kownacki was the heavy favorite, Helenius pulled off a significant upset by stopping Kownacki in the fourth round, handing him his first professional loss.

==== Kownacki vs. Helenius II ====
After over a year out of the ring, Kownacki returned on 9 October 2021 on the undercard of Tyson Fury vs. Deontay Wilder III, against Robert Helenius in a rematch of their previous 2020 fight. The bout was stopped after six rounds of dominance by Helenius against a clearly overpowered Kownacki. The former had inflicted his opponent with a swollen left eye, before suffering repeated low blows, which caused Kownacki to be disqualified in the sixth round. After the bout, the result was later changed to a technical knockout victory for Helenius.

== Personal life ==
Kownacki currently trains with fellow Polish boxer, Sławomir Bohdziewicz. Kownacki's younger brother Łukasz is an entrepreneur.

== Professional boxing record ==
26 fights	21 wins	4 losses
By knockout	16	3
By decision	5	1
No contests	1	

No.	Result	Record	Opponent	Type	Round, time	Date	Location	Notes
26	Win	21–4 (1)	Ezequiel Maderna	RTD	5 (12), 3:00	21 Nov 2026	Hala Sportowa im. Olimpijczyków, Łomża, Poland	
25	Loss	20–4 (1)	Kacper Meyna	TKO	1 (10), 0:45	2 Mar 2024	Hala Widowiskowo-Sportowa, Koszalin, Poland	For vacant Republic of Poland heavyweight title
24	NC	20–3 (1)	Joe Cusumano	TKO	8 (10), 2:00	24 Jun 2023	Hulu Theater, New York City, New York, US	Originally TKO win for Cusumano, result later ruled NC after Cusumano failed a drugs test
23	Loss	20–3	Ali Eren Demirezen	UD	10	30 Jul 2022	Barclays Center, New York City, New York, US	
22	Loss	20–2	Robert Helenius	TKO	6 (12), 2:38	9 Oct 2021	T-Mobile Arena, Paradise, Nevada, US	
21	Loss	20–1	Robert Helenius	TKO	4 (12), 1:08	7 Mar 2020	Barclays Center, New York City, New York, US	For vacant WBA Gold heavyweight title
20	Win	20–0	Chris Arreola	UD	12	3 Aug 2019	Barclays Center, New York City, New York, US	Won vacant IBF Inter-Continental heavyweight title
19	Win	19–0	Gerald Washington	TKO	2 (10), 1:09	26 Jan 2019	Barclays Center, New York City, New York, US	
18	Win	18–0	Charles Martin	UD	10	8 Sep 2018	Barclays Center, New York City, New York, US	
17	Win	17–0	Iago Kiladze	KO	6 (10), 2:08	20 Jan 2018	Barclays Center, New York City, New York, US	
16	Win	16–0	Artur Szpilka	TKO	4 (10), 1:37	14 Jul 2017	Nassau Coliseum, Uniondale, New York, US	
15	Win	15–0	Joshua Tufte	TKO	2 (8), 2:40	14 Jan 2017	Barclays Center, New York City, New York, US	
14	Win	14–0	Jesse Barboza	TKO	3 (6), 0:56	25 Jun 2016	Barclays Center, New York City, New York, US	
13	Win	13–0	Danny Kelly	UD	8	16 Jan 2016	Barclays Center, New York City, New York, US	
12	Win	12–0	Rodney Hernandez	UD	8	10 Oct 2015	Lowell Memorial Auditorium, Lowell, Massachusetts, US	
11	Win	11–0	Maurenzo Smith	KO	2 (8), 2:26	1 Aug 2015	Barclays Center, New York City, New York, US	
10	Win	10–0	Ytalo Perea	UD	8	29 May 2015	Barclays Center, New York City, New York, US	
9	Win	9–0	Randy Easton	KO	1 (6), 0:40	25 Apr 2015	Harrah's Philadelphia, Chester, Pennsylvania, US	
8	Win	8–0	Terrell Jamal Woods	TKO	4 (8), 1:36	1 Nov 2014	UIC Pavilion, Chicago, Illinois, US	
7	Win	7–0	Charles Ellis	TKO	5 (6), 0:15	2 Aug 2014	Revel Resort, Atlantic City, New Jersey, US	
6	Win	6–0	Excell Holmes	TKO	2 (4), 0:41	29 Mar 2014	The Ballroom, Boardwalk Hall, Atlantic City, New Jersey, US	
5	Win	5–0	Calbert Lewis	TKO	2 (4), 1:43	20 Apr 2013	Madison Square Garden Theater, New York City, New York US	
4	Win	4–0	Damon Clement	KO	2 (4), 0:42	16 Jul 2010	Prudential Center, Newark, New Jersey, US	
3	Win	3–0	Yohan Banks	KO	4 (4), 1:11	22 May 2010	Fitzgerald's Casino & Hotel, Tunica, Mississippi, US	
2	Win	2–0	Tyyab Beale	TKO	2 (4), 0:53	2 Apr 2010	Brooklyn Masonic Temple, New York City, New York, US	
1	Win	1–0	Carossee Auponte	TKO	1 (4), 0:22	30 Oct 2009	PAL Gym, Yonkers, New York, US	
