= Alexander Dimitrenko =

Ukrainian boxer (born 1982)

Alexander Dimitrenko Олександр Димитренко
Personal information
- Nicknames: Sascha; Babyface
- Nationality: Ukrainian German
- Born: Oleksandr Viktorovych Dymytrenko; 5 July 1982 (age 44) Yevpatoria, Crimea, Ukrainian SSR, Soviet Union
- Height: 2.01 m (6 ft 7 in)
- Weight: Heavyweight

Boxing career
- Reach: 209 cm (82 in)
- Stance: Orthodox

Boxing record
- Total fights: 47
- Wins: 41
- Win by KO: 26
- Losses: 6
Medal record
Men's amateur boxing
Representing Russia
World Junior Championships
Gold medal – first place	2000 Budapest	Super-heavyweight

Alexander Viktorovych "Sascha" Dimitrenko (Ukrainian: Олександр Вікторович Димитренко; born 5 July 1982) is a Ukrainian-born German former professional boxer who competed from 2001 to 2019, and held the European heavyweight title from 2010 to 2011.

== Amateur career ==
Dimitrenko began boxing at the age of fourteen. Representing Russia, he won the 2000 World Junior Championships in the super-heavyweight division at the age of eighteen, with German promoter Klaus-Peter Kohl offering him a deal immediately afterwards. Dimitrenko signed with Kohl's Universum promotion company and moved to Hamburg to begin his professional career.

== Professional career ==
=== Early career ===
Dimitrenko made his professional debut on 8 December 2001, stopping Marcus Johnson in four rounds on the undercard of the fight between Vitali Klitschko and Ross Puritty. Dimitrenko's professional debut averaged over 5 million viewers on Sat.1. Standing at an imposing 2.01 metres (6 ft 7 in), he was widely regarded as one of the top contenders for a future world title opportunity. He compiled a record of 14 wins in 14 bouts, ending 10 of them inside the distance, 8 of them - inside the first two rounds. He was then scheduled to face his first notable opponent, Ross Puritty. The bout generated attention in both Germany and Ukraine, given Puritty's win over Wladimir Klitschko six years prior, with Dimitrenko entertaining the idea of beating someone who had defeated one of the Klitschkos. The bout was scheduled to happen on 31 July 2004, but Purrity pulled out after suffering an elbow injury during training camp while sparring with Juan Carlos Gomez. Puritty pulled out just three days before the scheduled date. Instead, Dimitrenko faced former British and Commonwealth heavyweight champion Julius Francis, who at the time was used as a stepping stone by some of the rising prospects, such as Audley Harrison and Volodymyr Vyrchys, and as a stay-busy fight by heavyweight contenders. Dimitrenko won the bout by a lopsided unanimous decision (UD), with all three judges scoring the bout identically 80–72, giving Dimitrenko every round.

The fight between Dimitrenko and Puritty was rescheduled to take place on 6 November 2004, with Dimitrenko agreeing for a tune-up bout against Andy Sample. Dimitrenko defeated Sample by second-round TKO. On 6 November 2004, he finally faced Puritty in an anticipated showdown that was televised by ZDF. The fight was part of the three-fight main event which also saw Sergiy Dzindziruk defending his European welterweight title against Hussein Bayram, and Mario Veit defending WBO world super-middleweight title against Charles Brewer. Dimitrenko outboxed Puritty for the majority of the fight, staying on the outside and keeping his opponent at the end of his jab. Ultimately, Dimitrenko won the fight by unanimous decision (UD), with scores 80–72 (twice) and 79–73.

=== Rising through the rankings ===
In his next outing, on 5 March 2005, he faced hard-hitting American prospect, Chris Koval, on the undercard of Felix Sturm vs. Bert Schenk. This was Dimitrenko's first fight scheduled for 10 rounds. Coming into the fight, 22-year old Koval had 20–1 record with 16 KOs, with 11 of them in the first round. Dimitrenko was knocked down in the second round but dominated his opponent throughout the rest of the fight. The bout went full ten rounds, with Dimitrenko being declared the winner by a lopsided unanimous decision with scores 98–91 (twice) and 98–92. This was bettered on 2 July 2005, when Dimitrenko picked up two vacant regional championships — IBF and WBO Inter-Continental heavyweight titles — after a second-round knockout of Andreas Sidon.

Dimitrenko then agreed to face Vaughn Bean on September 28, 2005 as part of the card dedicated to the 100th anniversary of the birth of former world heavyweight champion Max Schmeling, with the main event of the night being the WBO world heavyweight title fight between Luan Krasniqi and Lamon Brewster. The fight card had seven boxers from the former Soviet Bloc scheduled to fight - Dimitrenko, Ruslan Chagaev, Denis Boytsov, Taras Bidenko, Valeriy Chechenev, Bagrat Ohanyan and Alexei Mazikin, with the latter being forced to pull out due to injury. 31-year old Bean, known for having competitive bouts with world champions Evander Holyfield and Michael Moorer and having only been stopped by Vitali Klitschko, was considered Dimitrenko's toughest challenge to date. In the opening rounds, Dimitrenko was mostly throwing straight punches, struggling with Bean's movement and counterpunching style as well as attacks to the body. Bean was deducted a point in round three for intentional low blows. In the eighth round, Dimitrenko staggered Bean with a left hook and continued to apply pressure on his opponent, going back-and-forth between attacks to the head and body. Dimitrenko was ultimately declared the winner by unanimous decision, with the judges scoring the bout 95–93, 96–92 and 95–93.

After defeating Chad Van Sickle by second-round TKO, Dimitrenko agreed to face Argentine boxer Gonzalo Omar Basile on 28 October 2006. In the build up to the fight, Basile received media attention for his tattoos. During pre-fight press conference, Basile claimed to be "the devil between heavyweights", while Dimitrenko expressed his disgust with "so many tasteless tattoos" on Basile's body, and that he was going to punish Basile for them. In the lead-up to the fight, Dimitrenko's coach Fritz Sdunek said that his fighter was getting better with each bout, and that very soon he would become "the new Klitschko" and fight for the world heavyweight title. The fight took place at Porsche-Arena in Stuttgart and was televised on ZDF. It was Basile's first professional bout outside of South America. The fight lasted 54 seconds, with Basile's corner throwing in the towel after Basile could not respond to a barrage of shots from Dimitrenko.

In his last fight of 2006, Dimitrenko faced an experienced American journeyman Billy Zumbrun on 18 November 2006, only three weeks after beating Basile. Originally, the main event of the card was supposed to be the fight between Felix Sturm and Gavin Topp, but the fight was postponed due to Sturm's injury. Dimitrenko, regarded as a popular commodity in Germany at the time, was considered to be an adequate replacement for Sturm. According to Dimitrenko, the fight turned out to be "tougher than expected". He won by a shut-out unanimous decision, knocking Zumbrun down in the first round and dominating him throughout the rest of the fight. Zumbrun was deducted a point in the tenth round for headbutting. The judges scored the bout 120–105, 119–107 and 120–106. By the end of 2006, Dimitrenko was ranked as the world's ninth best heavyweight by BoxRec. He was also ranked No.4 heavyweight contender by WBO.

Dimitrenko then had two stay-busy fights in the first half of 2007, defeating American heavyweights Danny Batchelder and Malcolm Tann by mid-fight TKOs. By July 2007, Dimitrenko was ranked No.2 contender by WBO, No.6 contender by WBC and No. 10 contender by WBA. He then signed to face Timo Hoffmann on 17 November 2007. Hoffmann, who had previously faced fighters like Vitali Klitschko, Luan Krasniqi and Henry Akinwande and was known for his durability, had never been stopped inside the distance coming into this bout and was expected to be a tough challenge for Dimitrenko and an opportunity to elevate Dimitrenko's popularity in Germany. Dimitrenko weighed in at 253.5 pounds (115.0 kg) and was outweighed by Hoffmann by 5.5 pounds (2.5 kg). This was also the first professional fight in which Dimitrenko was fighting someone taller than himself. The bout took place at Bördelandhalle in Magdeburg and was the main event of the card that was aired on ZDF.

Both fighters started fighting aggressively and throwing heavy shots from the opening bell, with Dimitrenko appearing to be doing the better work, finding success working Hoffmann's body. At the beginning of the fourth round, Dimitrenko unleashed a barrage of punches that sent Hoffmann to the canvas. Hoffmann got up but was knocked down again after a series of body shots. By the end of the round, Dimitrenko appeared to be tired. Hoffmann regained composure in round 5, pressing Dimitrenko against the ropes and knocking him down with a left hook. In the second half of the fight, both fighters were trading shots, with Dimitrenko having the upper hand in most of the exchanges. By the eighth round, Hoffmann's face was covered in blood, while Dimitrenko had swells above both eyes. Dimitrenko unleashed another barrage of punches in the twelfth round, knocking Hoffmann down again. Hoffmann got up, but was soon dropped again. Dimitrenko then threw a series of unanswered shots, prompting the referee to stop the bout after Hoffmann was dropped again, with 36 seconds left to the end of the fight. Dimitrenko became the first boxer to defeat Timo Hoffmann inside the distance. During post-fight drug testing, Hoffmann tested positive for anabolic steroids. By the end of 2007, Dimitrenko was ranked by BoxRec as the tenth best heavyweight in the world.

After defeating Derric Rossy by fifth-round TKO in a stay-busy fight, Dimitrenko then signed to face then-highly regarded German boxer Luan Krasniqi on 18 November in Düsseldorf, as part of the show billed by Universum as "Golden November". Many observers saw this fight as a big step up in competition for Dimitrenko and Krasniqi's last chance to regain his stock after losses to Lamon Brewster and Tony Thompson. During pre-fight press conference, Krasniqi said that if he wouldn't beat Dimitrenko, he was going to retire.

The fight lasted only three rounds. In the third round, Dimitrenko dropped Krasniqi with a liver shot. Krasniqi was unable to get up at the count of ten, prompting the referee to stop the fight and declaring Dimitrenko the winner by third-round KO. This was Dimitrenko's fifth stoppage in a row, achieved against opponents with combined record 133–15–3. At the conclusion of 2008, Dimitrenko was ranked No.10 heavyweight in the world by The Ring. He was also ranked No.2 contender by WBO, No.3 by WBC and No.7 contender by WBA and IBF.

=== WBO world heavyweight title eliminator ===
After two reigns as WBO Inter-Continental champion, Dimitrenko was scheduled to face Eddie Chambers in a WBO world heavyweight title eliminator. At the time of the fight, Chambers was ranked No.6 heavyweight contender by The Ring, while Dimitrenko was ranked No.8 by the same publication. Dimitrenko was also ranked within top 5 by all major sanctioning bodies. Dimitrenko weighed in at 253 1/4 lbs, outweighing Chambers by 45 1/2 lbs. The fight took place at Color Line Arena in Hamburg, Germany and was televised by ZDF. Dimitrenko was outboxed for most of the fight, visibly unprepared for Chambers' unusually aggressive approach and unable to keep up with his speed and fighting IQ. Dimitrenko received a standing count in the seventh round after a left hook to the body, and was knocked down in the tenth after another left hook, this time to the chin. Dimitrenko lost the fight by majority decision. The judges scored the bout 117–109 and 116–111 in favor of Chambers, and 113–113 even.

=== Later fights; inactivity and return ===
Looking to regain his stock, Dimitrenko agreed to face Luan Krasniqi in a rematch on 28 November 2009 in Düsseldorf, Germany. Some observes criticized the fight, pointing out that Krasniqi hadn't fought in the ring since their first encounter. Dimitrenko dismissed these criticisms, claiming that Krasniqi, despite the long stretch of inactivity, was still a dangerous, highly experienced fighter. Three weeks before the scheduled date, Krasniqi was forced to pull out due to sprained Achilles tendon on his right leg. The fight was postponed, then cancelled altogether.

Shortly after Audley Harrison (26–4, 20 KOs) defeated Michael Sprott (32–14, 17 KOs) on 9 April for the vacant European heavyweight title, EBU ordered him to fight the mandatory challenger Dimitrenko in his first defense. During the Sprott fight, Harrison allegedly suffered an injury that was going to keep him out of action for four months. Dimitrenko expressed doubt over the alleged injury: "[Harrison] was wildly celebrating the victory, jumping and waving his arms. Then he had a surgery. The surgery took place on 24 April. So he was walking in pain for more than two weeks? And only after that he went under the knife? But I have not seen a single official document confirming the injury of an Englishman." Harrison openly stated his interest in fighting David Haye while also eyeing a bout against one of the Klitschkos; he admitted that the victory over Dimitrenko would pave him a way to the Klitschko bout as it would allow him to become the top 10 contender of each of the major sanctioning bodies. On 9 June, Harrison was stripped of the title.

Eventually Dimitrenko agreed to face Dennis Bakhtov (33–5, 23 KOs) for the vacant European heavyweight title on 30 July 2010 in Yekaterinburg, Russia. Bakhtov's manager German Titov won the right to promote the bout with a purse bid of €260,000. A few days before the scheduled date, the bout was cancelled due to Bakhtov allegedly suffering an injury. However, there were rumours that the event was cancelled due to Titov's financial problems. Instead, Yaroslav Zavorotnyi (14–4, 12 KOs) came in as a late replacement. The bout took place in Hamburg, Germany. Dimitrenko dominated the entire fight. In the fifth, Dimitrenko pressed Zavorotnyi to the corner and threw a barrage of unanswered punches, prompting Zavorotnyi's corner to throw in the towel. Two successful defences were made in 2011 against British journeyman Michael Sprott and former world title challenger Albert Sosnowski. In February 2012, Dimitrenko announced that he had terminated his contract with Universum Box-Promotion. Soon after, Dimitrenko hired Scott Welch.

After two defenses of the European title, Dimitrenko agreed to face undefeated Bulgarian prospect Kubrat Pulev on 5 May 2012 on the undercard of Marco Huck vs. Ola Afolabi. 6 ft 4in tall Pulev, despite making his professional debut at a relatively late age, was highly regarded due to his amateur background and unorthodox fighting style, and was expected to be one of the most dangerous heavyweights to challenge Wladimir Klitschko for the heavyweight title. Many observers were giving both fighters an even chance to win, and expected the winner of this bout to fight for the title in the near future. Some observers expected the fight to bring Dimitrenko back into the world title contention. Pulev and his trainer Otto Ramin expected a tough fight although Dimitrenko had not fought since September 2011. Dimitrenko weighed in at 257.5 pounds (116.8 kg), 12 lbs heavier than Pulev.

The fight took place at Messehalle in Erfurt, Germany, and was aired live on Das Erste. Dimitrenko started the fight well, using his height and reach to his advantage. He also moved well on his feet to avoid punishment. In round 4, Pulev began to find his range and began countering and landing some power punch combinations of his own, rocking Dimitrenko at times. Dimitrenko looked faded as he entered round 11. Pulev landed a jab which slowly dropped Dimitrenko to a knee. At this point, he had taken much punishment and remained down. Referee Guido Cavalleri counted him out, giving Pulev an 11th round KO win.

A stoppage loss to Pulev appeared to have derailed Dimitrenko's career. Without a prominent promoter and trained by a local gym coach, Dimitrenko scored two uninspiring decisions against journeymen before entering a long stretch of inactivity. Despite rumours about his retirement appearing in the media, Dimitrenko insisted that he was going to return to the ring "as soon as possible".

Dimitrenko would spend more than two years out of the sport, from March 2013 to May 2015. He made his return on 30 May 2015, defeating Patryk Kowoll by first-round TKO. He was slated to face former heavyweight champion Shannon Briggs in May 2016, but this fell through. On 1 October 2016, Dimitrenko was knocked out in three rounds by Joseph Parker. On 18 March 2017, in an upset, Dimitrenko knocked out undefeated heavyweight contender Adrian Granat in the first round to win the IBF International heavyweight title.

On 18 August 2018, Dimitrenko, ranked No. 10 heavyweight contender by the IBF at the time, faced Bryant Jennings, ranked No. 8 by the WBO and No. 11 by the WBA. Jennings ended the fight via a ninth-round TKO.

In his next fight, Dimitrenko faced WBA's No. 11 and IBF's No. 15 heavyweight contender Andy Ruiz Jr. Dimitrenko seemed disinterested during the fight, as Andy Ruiz Jr was dominating for most of the rounds. By the end of the fifth, Ruiz Jr started to hurt Dimitrenko, which resulted in Dimitrenko's corner stopping the fight before the beginning of the sixth round.

On 13 July 2019, Dimitrenko faced former Olympic gold medal winner Tony Yoka. Yoka made easy work out of the veteran, knocking him out within three rounds in his home country of France.

== Personal life ==
Dimitrenko became a German citizen in 2010.

== Professional boxing record ==
47 fights	41 wins	6 losses
By knockout	26	5
By decision	14	1
By disqualification	1	0

No.	Result	Record	Opponent	Type	Round, time	Date	Location	Notes
47	Loss	41–6	Tony Yoka	TKO	3 (10), 2:00	13 Jul 2019	Azur Arena, Antibes, France	
46	Loss	41–5	Andy Ruiz Jr.	RTD	5 (10), 3:00	20 Apr 2019	Dignity Health Sports Park, Carson, California, US	
45	Loss	41–4	Bryant Jennings	TKO	9 (12), 1:56	18 Aug 2018	Ocean Resort Casino, Atlantic City, New Jersey, US	Lost IBF International heavyweight title; For vacant NABO heavyweight title
44	Win	41–3	Miljan Rovcanin	DQ	10	22 Dec 2017	Alsterdorfer Sporthalle, Hamburg, Germany	Originally SD, later ruled DQ win for Dimitrenko
43	Win	40–3	Adrian Granat	KO	1 (12), 2:07	18 Mar 2017	Baltiska hallen, Malmö, Sweden	Won IBF International heavyweight title
42	Win	39–3	Milos Dovedan	KO	2 (4), 1:45	15 Feb 2017	ECB Boxgym, Hamburg, Germany	
41	Loss	38–3	Joseph Parker	KO	3 (12), 1:38	1 Oct 2016	Vodafone Events Centre, Auckland, New Zealand	For WBO Oriental heavyweight title
40	Win	38–2	Drazan Janjanin	UD	8	16 Jan 2016	Bavaria Filmgelände, Munich, Germany	
39	Win	37–2	Milos Dovedan	TKO	2 (10), 1:17	24 Oct 2015	Schulsporthalle, Hamburg, Germany	
38	Win	36–2	Zoltan Csala	TKO	2 (8), 2:50	11 Jul 2015	GETEC Arena, Magdeburg, Germany	
37	Win	35–2	Patryk Kowoll	TKO	1 (6), 2:20	30 May 2015	Boxsporthalle Braamkamp, Hamburg, Germany	
36	Win	34–2	Ivica Perkovic	UD	8	9 Mar 2013	CU Arena, Hamburg, Germany	
35	Win	33–2	Samir Kurtagic	UD	8	21 Dec 2012	Sluneta, Ústí nad Labem, Czech Republic	
34	Loss	32–2	Kubrat Pulev	KO	11 (12), 2:59	5 May 2012	Messe, Erfurt, Germany	For IBF International and vacant European heavyweight title
33	Win	32–1	Michael Sprott	UD	12	24 Sep 2011	Dima-Sportcenter, Hamburg, Germany	Retained European heavyweight title
32	Win	31–1	Albert Sosnowski	KO	12 (12), 1:38	26 Mar 2011	Universum Gym, Hamburg, Germany	Retained European heavyweight title
31	Win	30–1	Yaroslav Zavorotnyi	TKO	5 (12), 1:25	31 Jul 2010	O2 World, Hamburg, Germany	Won vacant European heavyweight title
30	Loss	29–1	Eddie Chambers	MD	12	4 Jul 2009	Color Line Arena, Hamburg, Germany	
29	Win	29–0	Luan Krasniqi	KO	3 (12), 2:54	15 Nov 2008	Burg-Wächter Castello, Düsseldorf, Germany	Retained WBO Inter-Continental heavyweight title
28	Win	28–0	Derric Rossy	TKO	5 (12), 2:58	3 May 2008	Hanns-Martin-Schleyer-Halle, Stuttgart, Germany	Retained WBO Inter-Continental heavyweight title
27	Win	27–0	Timo Hoffmann	TKO	12 (12), 2:24	17 Nov 2007	Bördelandhalle, Magdeburg, Germany	Retained WBO Inter-Continental heavyweight title
26	Win	26–0	Malcolm Tann	TKO	5 (12), 2:23	14 Jul 2007	Color Line Arena, Hamburg, Germany	Retained WBO Inter-Continental heavyweight title
25	Win	25–0	Danny Batchelder	TKO	7 (10), 2:41	17 Mar 2007	Hanns-Martin-Schleyer-Halle, Stuttgart, Germany	
24	Win	24–0	Billy Zumbrun	UD	12	18 Nov 2006	Burg-Wächter Castello, Düsseldorf, Germany	Retained WBO Inter-Continental heavyweight title
23	Win	23–0	Gonzalo Basile	KO	1 (12), 0:54	28 Oct 2006	Porsche-Arena, Stuttgart, Germany	Retained WBO Inter-Continental heavyweight title
22	Win	22–0	Chad Van Sickle	TKO	2 (12), 2:21	29 Jul 2006	König Pilsener Arena, Oberhausen, Germany	Retained WBO Inter-Continental heavyweight title
21	Win	21–0	Fernely Feliz	UD	12	8 Apr 2006	Ostseehalle, Kiel, Germany	Won vacant WBO Inter-Continental heavyweight title
20	Win	20–0	Vaughn Bean	UD	10	28 Sep 2005	Color Line Arena, Hamburg, Germany	
19	Win	19–0	Andreas Sidon	KO	2 (12), 1:00	2 Jul 2005	Color Line Arena, Hamburg, Germany	Won vacant IBF Inter-Continental and WBO Inter-Continental heavyweight titles
18	Win	18–0	Chris Koval	UD	10	5 Mar 2005	Wilhelm-Dopatka-Halle, Leverkusen, Germany	Won vacant IBF Youth heavyweight title
17	Win	17–0	Ross Puritty	UD	8	6 Nov 2004	Erdgas Arena, Riesa, Germany	
16	Win	16–0	Andy Sample	TKO	2 (8), 1:49	18 Sep 2004	Wilhelm-Dopatka-Halle, Leverkusen, Germany	
15	Win	15–0	Julius Francis	UD	8	31 Jul 2004	Hanns-Martin-Schleyer-Halle, Stuttgart, Germany	
14	Win	14–0	Ramon Hayes	TKO	2 (8), 2:30	8 May 2004	Westfalenhallen, Dortmund, Germany	
13	Win	13–0	Sam Ubokane	TKO	5 (6)	14 Feb 2004	Hanns-Martin-Schleyer-Halle, Stuttgart, Germany	
12	Win	12–0	Jeff Pegues	KO	1 (8), 1:42	20 Dec 2003	Ostseehalle, Kiel, Germany	
11	Win	11–0	Ivan Aparecido Rosa	TKO	1 (8)	15 Nov 2003	Oberfrankenhalle, Bayreuth, Germany	
10	Win	10–0	Kendrick Releford	PTS	6	30 Aug 2003	Olympiahalle, Munich, Germany	
9	Win	9–0	Nino Fiumana	TKO	1 (6)	12 Jul 2003	Wilhelm-Dopatka-Halle, Leverkusen, Germany	
8	Win	8–0	Miguel Aguirre	UD	6	10 May 2003	Hanns-Martin-Schleyer-Halle, Stuttgart, Germany	
7	Win	7–0	Mark Bradley	KO	2	29 Mar 2003	Color Line Arena, Hamburg, Germany	
6	Win	6–0	Jeff Ford	UD	4	7 Dec 2002	Mandalay Bay Events Center, Paradise, Nevada, US	
5	Win	5–0	Alphonzo Davis	KO	1 (4)	12 Oct 2002	Sport- und Kongresshalle, Schwerin, Germany	
4	Win	4–0	James Lester	PTS	4	17 Aug 2002	Estrel Hotel, Berlin, Germany	
3	Win	3–0	Tim Martin	KO	1 (4)	16 Mar 2002	Hanns-Martin-Schleyer-Halle, Stuttgart, Germany	
2	Win	2–0	Elvert Gill	KO	1 (4)	8 Feb 2002	Volkswagen Halle, Braunschweig, Germany	
1	Win	1–0	Marcus Johnson	TKO	4	8 Dec 2001	König Pilsener Arena, Oberhausen, Germany	

== Viewership ==
=== Germany ===
Date	Fight	Viewership (avg.)	Network	Source
8 December 2001	Alexander Dimitrenko vs. Marcus Johnson	5,080,000	Sat.1	
28 October 2006	Alexander Dimitrenko vs. Gonzalo Basile	4,000,000	ZDF	
17 November 2007	Alexander Dimitrenko vs. Timo Hoffmann	4,560,000	ZDF	
15 November 2008	Alexander Dimitrenko vs. Luan Krasniqi	4,770,000	ZDF	
4 July 2009	Alexander Dimitrenko vs. Eddie Chambers	4,940,000	ZDF	
5 May 2012	Alexander Dimitrenko vs. Kubrat Pulev	1,920,000	Das Erste	
	Total viewership	25,270,000		

Sporting positions
Regional boxing titles
New title	IBF Youth heavyweight champion 5 March 2005 – 2 July 2005; Won Inter-Continental title	Title discontinued
Vacant Title last held by Paolo Vidoz	IBF Inter-Continental heavyweight champion 2 July 2005 – September 2005; Vacated	Vacant Title next held by Henry Akinwande
Vacant Title last held by Volodymyr Virchis	WBO Inter-Continental heavyweight champion 2 July 2005 – September 2005; Vacated	Vacant Title next held by Volodymyr Virchis
Vacant Title last held by Ruslan Chagaev	WBO Inter-Continental heavyweight champion 8 April 2006 – March 2007; Vacated	Vacant Title next held by Luan Krasniqi
Vacant Title last held by Tony Thompson	WBO Inter-Continental heavyweight champion 14 July 2007 – July 2009; Vacated	Vacant Title next held by Robert Helenius
Vacant Title last held by Audley Harrison	European heavyweight champion 31 July 2010 – December 2011; Vacated	Vacant Title next held by Robert Helenius
Preceded by Adrian Granat	IBF International heavyweight champion 18 March 2017 – 18 August 2018	Succeeded by Bryant Jennings
