= Edmund Gerber =

German boxer (born 1988)

Personal information
- Nationality: German
- Born: Vlad Gerber; 2 August 1988 (age 38) Kazakh SSR, Soviet Union
- Height: 6 ft 3 in (191 cm)
- Weight: Heavyweight

Boxing career
- Stance: Orthodox

Boxing record
- Total fights: 30
- Wins: 28
- Win by KO: 18
- Losses: 2
Medal record
Men's amateur boxing
Representing Germany
EU Junior Championships
Bronze medal – third place	2006 Rome	Heavyweight
European Cadet Championships
Gold medal – first place	2005 Siófok	Heavyweight
German Junior National Championships
Gold medal – first place	2006 Magdeburg	Heavyweight
Silver medal – second place	2007 Altentreptow	Super-heavyweight

Edmund Gerber (born 2 August 1988) is a German former professional boxer who competed from 2007 to 2018. At regional level, he challenged once for the European heavyweight title in 2013. As an amateur, he won a bronze medal at the 2006 European Union Junior Championships.

== Amateur career ==
Gerber was a successful amateur on junior level, winning gold at the 2005 European cadet (U17) championships and bronze in 2006 European Junior championships where he lost to eventual winner Remzi Ozbek.

== Professional career ==
Gerber made his professional debut in 2007.

In 2009 he stopped Marcel Zeller (record 22-4) and Shawn McLean (4-4) who had recently KOd undefeated (38-0) Faruq Saleem but didn't create a lot of interest with his first 9 bouts. That changed significantly in 2010 when he not only beat the experienced southpaw Rene Dettweiler (record 25-2 with a win over Gbenga Oloukun) but was also the first fighter to stop him, needing just two rounds for it. He also got a TKO win against Michael Sprott but was losing this fight heavily, it was a controversial stoppage as Michael Sprott got to his feet by the 8 count and looked well enough to continue. However three months later for the first time in his pro career, Edmund lost the rematch with Sprott by majority decision.

On 21 September 2013, Gerber fought for the vacant European heavyweight title against former world title challenger Derek Chisora at the Copper Box Arena in London. The fight was announced 20 days prior to the fight taking place. Chisora controlled the fight from the opening bell, eventually drawing blood from Gerber after three rounds. The fight came to end in round five when Chisora threw combinations which went unanswered. The referee stepped in waiving the fight off. At the time of stoppage, Chisora was ahead 40–36 on all three judges' scorecards.

== Professional boxing record ==
30 fights	28 wins	2 losses
By knockout	18	1
By decision	10	1

No.	Result	Record	Opponent	Type	Round, time	Date	Location	Notes
30	Win	28–2	Samir Barakovic	TKO	2 (8), 0:31	27 May 2018	Gildehaus, Lüchow, Germany	
29	Win	27–2	Gabriel Enguema	MD	8	10 Mar 2018	Stadthalle, Gütersloh, Germany	
28	Win	26–2	Brian Minto	TKO	2 (10), 2:14	5 Mar 2016	Colosseum Sport Hall, Grozny, Russia	
27	Win	25–2	Lubos Suda	TKO	5 (10), 1:47	11 Jul 2015	GETEC Arena, Magdeburg, Germany	
26	Win	24–2	Vicente Sandez	TKO	2 (12), 1:52	06 Jul 2014	Akhmat-Arena, Grozny, Russia	Won vacant WBC International Silver heavyweight title
25	Loss	23–2	Derek Chisora	TKO	5 (12), 2:50	21 Sep 2013	Copper Box Arena, London, England	For vacant European heavyweight title
24	Win	23–1	Gbenga Oluokun	UD	8	23 Mar 2013	GETEC Arena, Magdeburg, Germany	
23	Loss	22–1	Michael Sprott	MD	10	15 Dec 2012	Nuremberg Arena, Nuremberg, Germany	
22	Win	22–0	Darnell Wilson	UD	8	3 Nov 2012	Gerry Weber Stadion, Halle, Germany	
21	Win	21–0	Michael Sprott	TKO	4 (8), 2:41	15 Sep 2012	Stechert Arena, Bamberg, Germany	
20	Win	20–0	Maurice Harris	UD	8	5 May 2012	Messe, Erfurt, Germany	
19	Win	19–0	Oleksiy Mazikin	RTD	5 (8), 3:00	25 Feb 2012	Porsche-Arena, Stuttgart, Germany	
18	Win	18–0	Marcus McGee	KO	1 (8), 0:18	3 Dec 2011	Hartwall Arena, Helsinki, Finland	
17	Win	17–0	Yohan Banks	KO	7 (8), 2:10	1 Oct 2011	Jahnsportforum, Neubrandenburg, Germany	
16	Win	16–0	Zack Page	UD	8	4 Jun 2011	Parken Stadium, Copenhagen, Denmark	
15	Win	15–0	Carl Baker	TKO	1 (8), 1:44	7 May 2011	Jahnsportforum, Neubrandenburg, Germany	
14	Win	14–0	Paul Butlin	UD	8	12 Feb 2011	Herning Kongrescenter, Herning, Denmark	
13	Win	13–0	Colin Kenna	TKO	1 (8), 1:30	13 Nov 2010	MEN Arena, Manchester, England	
12	Win	12–0	Lee Swaby	KO	4 (8), 1:35	22 Oct 2010	EKZ "Helle Mitte", Berlin, Germany	
11	Win	11–0	Samir Kurtagic	UD	8	24 Apr 2010	MCH Arena, Herning, Denmark	
10	Win	10–0	Rene Dettweiler	TKO	2 (8), 0:47	30 Jan 2010	Jahnsportforum, Neubrandenburg, Germany	
9	Win	9–0	Shawn McLean	TKO	1 (8), 2:52	7 Nov 2009	Nuremberg Arena, Nuremberg, Germany	
8	Win	8–0	Marcel Zeller	TKO	6 (6), 1:39	19 Sep 2009	Jahnsportforum, Neubrandenburg, Germany	
7	Win	7–0	Frank Wuestenberghs	KO	1 (6)	3 Jul 2009	Tent Reinaert Veld, Lochristi, Belgium	
6	Win	6–0	Enrico Garmendia	TKO	3 (4), 2:42	9 May 2009	JAKO Arena, Bamberg, Germany	
5	Win	5–0	Stanislav Lukyanchikov	RTD	3 (6), 3:00	7 Jun 2008	Karl-Eckel-Weg Halle, Hattersheim am Main, Germany	
4	Win	4–0	Ergin Solmaz	UD	4	14 Mar 2008	Zenith, Munich, Germany	
3	Win	3–0	Aleh Dubiaha	UD	4	23 Dec 2007	Maritim Hotel, Halle, Germany	
2	Win	2–0	Klaids Kristapsons	TKO	2 (4)	17 Nov 2007	Sporthalle Neue Zeit, Schwedt, Germany	
1	Win	1–0	Jevgēņijs Stamburskis	PTS	4	11 Oct 2007	Arena Gym, Hamburg, Germany	

Sporting positions
Regional boxing titles
Vacant Title last held by Manuel Charr	WBC International Silver heavyweight champion 6 July 2014 – September 2015; Vacated	Vacant Title next held by Dillian Whyte
