= Gbenga Oloukun =

Nigerian boxer (born 1983)

Gbenga Oluokun
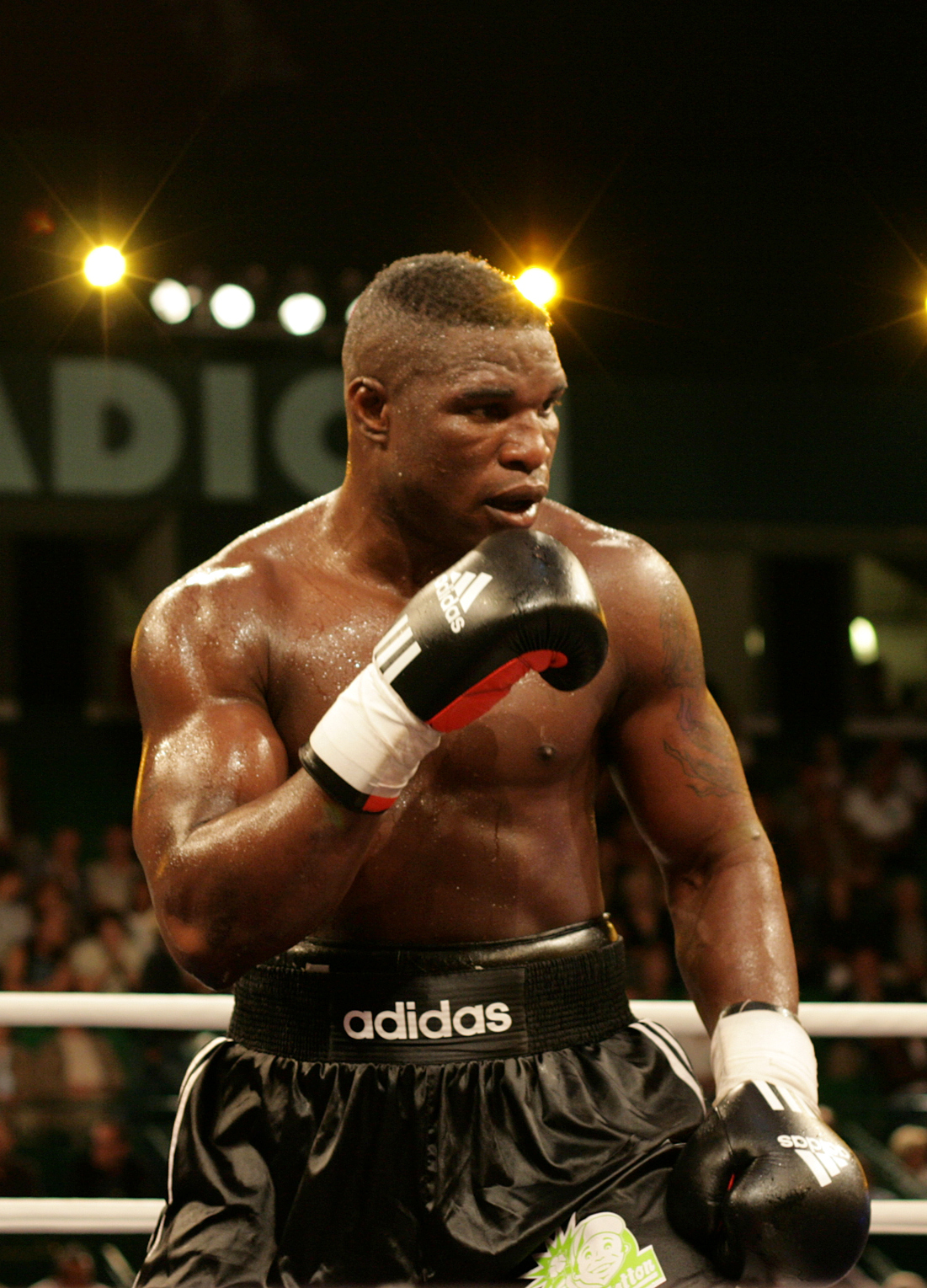
- Gbenga Oluokun

Personal information
- Nickname: Bang-Bang
- Nationality: Nigerian
- Born: Gbenga Oluokun; 14 June 1983 (age 43) Oyo, Nigeria
- Height: 6 ft 1 185 cm
- Weight: Heavyweight

Boxing career
- Stance: Orthodox

Boxing record
- Total fights: 41
- Wins: 22
- Win by KO: 14
- Losses: 19
- Draws: 0
- No contests: 0
Medal record
Men's Boxing
Representing Nigeria
All-Africa Games
Gold medal – first place	2003 Abuja	Super Heavyweight

Gbenga Oluokun (born 14 June 1983) is a boxer from Nigeria, who participated in the 2004 Summer Olympics for his native country. He has faced former world champions and contenders Mahmoud Charr, Lamon Brewster, Kubrat Pulev, Robert Helenius, Carlos Takam, Vyacheslav Glazkov, and Mariusz Wach.

== Amateur ==
In 2003, he captured the gold medal in his weight division at the All-Africa Games in Abuja, Nigeria vs Egypt's Mohamed Aly.

At the Olympics 2004, he was defeated in the round of sixteen of the super heavyweight (over 91 kg) division by Italy's eventual runner-up Roberto Cammarelle.

== Professional ==
He turned pro afterwards and won 16 fights before being upset by Manuel Charr in 2009.

== Professional boxing record ==
22 Wins (14 knockouts, 8 decisions), 19 Losses (12 knockouts, 7 decisions)
Result	Record	Opponent	Type	Round	Date	Location	Notes
Loss	19–14	(Poland) Krzysztof Zimnoch	KO	2 (8)	2015-10-17	Wieliczka, Poland	
Loss	19–13	(Poland) Marcin Rekowski	KO	5 (8)	10/04/2015	Gliwice, Poland	
Loss	19–12	(Poland) Mariusz Wach	UD	10	14/03/2015	RCS Lubin, Lubin, Poland	
Win	19–11	(Germany) Sascha Brinkmann	KO	2 (6)	13/12/2014	Unihalle Wuppertal, Nordrhein-Westfalen, Germany	
Loss	18–11	(Germany) Agit Kabayel	SD	10	22/03/2014	Atatürk Spor Salonu, Tekirdağ, Turkey	For vacant WBC Mediterranean heavyweight title
Loss	18–10	(Germany) Edmund Gerber	UD	8	23/08/2013	GETEC Arena, Magdeburg, Germany	
Loss	18–9	(Germany) Erkan Teper	UD	8	14/09/2012	Halle an der Saale, Germany	
Loss	18–8	(Ukraine) Vyacheslav Glazkov	TKO	7	01/05/2012	Krylatskoe Sport Palace, Moscow, Russia	Referee stopped the bout at 1:32 of the seventh round.
Loss	18–7	(France) Carlos Takam	RTD	6	29/04/2011	Espace Roger Boisrame, Pontault-Combault, France	For WBO Africa heavyweight title
Win	18–6	(Germany) Konstantin Airich	TKO	4	12/11/2010	HanseDom, Stralsund, Germany	Referee stopped the bout at 0:47 of the fourth round.
Loss	17–6	(Ukraine) Oleg Platov	TKO	6	05/06/2010	Jahnsportforum, Neubrandenburg, Germany	Referee stopped the bout at 2:27 of the sixth round.
Loss	17–5	(Ukraine) Pavel Zhuralev	UD	3	07/05/2010	Pavilion Nicosia, Nicosia, Cyprus	Bigger's Better Tournament Semi-Final.
Loss	17–4	(Finland) Robert Helenius	UD	8	26/03/2010	Töölö Sports Hall, Helsinki, Finland	
Loss	17–3	(Bulgaria) Kubrat Pulev	UD	6	07/11/2009	Nuremberg Arena, Nuremberg, Germany	
Loss	17–2	(Germany) Rene Dettweiler	UD	8	17/10/2009	O2 World Arena, Berlin, Germany	
Win	17–1	(United States) Lamon Brewster	UD	8	29/08/2009	Gerry Weber Stadium, Halle, Germany	
Loss	16–1	(Syria) Mahmoud Charr	KO	7	25/04/2009	König Palast, Krefeld, Germany	Gbenga knocked out at 1:29 of the seventh round.
Win	16–0	(Czech Republic) Petr Sedlak	TKO	2	10/05/2008	Brandberge Arena, Halle an der Saale, Germany	Referee stopped the bout at 2:46 of the second round.
Win	15–0	(Brazil) Raphael Zumbano Love	UD	8	08/03/2008	König Palast, Krefeld, Germany	
Win	14–0	(Latvia) Edgars Kalnars	KO	3	04/12/2007	Freizeit Arena, Soelden, Austria	Kalnars knocked out at 0:35 of the third round.
Win	13–0	(Portugal) Humberto Evora	KO	4	07/11/2007	(Austria) Soelden	
Win	12–0	(Russia) Alexander Vasiliev	KO	8	14/07/2007	Color Line Arena, Hamburg, Germany	Vasiliev knocked out at 1:58 of the eighth round.
Win	11–0	(Russia) Alexey Varakin	KO	4	07/04/2007	Universum Gym, Wandsbek, Germany	Varakin knocked out at 1:38 of the fourth round.
Win	10–0	(Russia) Daniil Peretyatko	UD	6	13/01/2007	Brandberge Arena, Halle an der Saale, Germany	
Win	9–0	(France) Antoine Palatis	TKO	6	21/11/2006	Universum Gym, Wandsbek, Germany	Referee stopped the bout at 1:22 of the sixth round.
Win	8–0	(Ukraine) Yaroslav Zavorotnyi	MD	6	19/09/2006	Kugelbake-Halle, Cuxhaven, Germany	
Win	7–0	(Lithuania) Mindaugas Kulikauskas	UD	6	22/08/2006	Universum Gym, Hamburg, Germany	
Win	6–0	(Latvia) Aleksandrs Borhovs	TKO	2	25/07/2006	Sportschule Sachsenwald, Hamburg, Germany	Referee stopped the bout at 2:12 of the second round.
Win	5–0	(Romania) Mihai Iftode	RTD	3	15/04/2006	Maritim Hotel, Magdeburg, Germany	
Win	4–0	(Poland) Tomasz Zeprzalka	MD	4	07/03/2006	Kugelbake Halle, Cuxhaven, Germany	
Win	3–0	(Slovakia) Peter Oravec	TKO	1	14/01/2006	Ballhaus Arena, Aschersleben, Germany	Referee stopped the bout at 2:35 of the first round.
Win	2–0	(Hungary) Sandor Forgacs	TKO	1	26/11/2005	Wilhelm Dopatka Halle, Leverkusen, Germany	Referee stopped the bout at 2:44 of the first round.
Win	1–0	(Slovakia) Vlado Szabo	UD	4	28/09/2005	Color Line Arena, Hamburg, Germany	
