= Michael Sprott =

British boxer (born 1975)

Personal information
- Nationality: British
- Born: 16 January 1975 (age 51) Reading, Berkshire, England
- Height: 6 ft 1 in (1.85 m)
- Weight: Heavyweight

Boxing career
- Stance: Orthodox

Boxing record
- Total fights: 71
- Wins: 42
- Win by KO: 17
- Losses: 29

Michael Sprott (born 16 January 1975) is a British former professional boxer who competed from 1996 to 2018. At regional level, he held multiple heavyweight championships, including the British and Commonwealth titles in 2004; and challenged three times for the European title in 2005, 2010 and 2011; and won the Prizefighter series in 2010 and 2013.

== Career ==
After a quiet amateur career, Sprott turned pro in November 1996 under the old Frank Bruno trainer, Terry Lawless. He won 11 fights, including a points win over veteran Michael Murray before taking on Harry Senior in September 1998 for the Southern Area Heavyweight title. Senior, a respected sparring partner, had recently dedicated himself to being a full-time professional, and took Sprott out in 6 rounds with body shots. Sprott came back with 3 wins before falling apart in 3 rounds versus British contender Wayne Llewelyn in October 2000.

Seemingly relegated to journeyman status, In February 2001 in London, Sprott scored an upset when he outpointed the once-beaten German Timo Hoffmann, who had lost only to Vitali Klitschko. He travelled to Germany for the rematch, controversially outpointed by Hoffmann in a result that was jeered loudly by the German crowd.

In November 2001, he travelled to South Africa to face hard hitting fringe contender Corrie Sanders. In a brief and entertaining fight, Sprott rocked the southpaw before being decked himself, and suffering a controversial stoppage by the referee, with even the South African commentators deploring the stoppage.

In February 2002, Keith Long pulled out from a British and Commonwealth title fight with Danny Williams, and Sprott flew in from a holiday in Jamaica on only a few days notice. After a few rounds he ran out of gas and was stopped in the seventh round, but showed he could compete at national level. It was around this time that Sprott brought in trainer John Bloomfield, who spent six years with Frank Bruno.

After this challenge, Sprott went on a successful run of form, winning 8 fights, including knockouts of Pele Reid (KO7), ex-British champ Michael Holden (KO4), Mark Potter (KO3), and Colin Kenna (KO1), setting up a rematch with Williams.

In September 2003, Sprott qualified for another shot at Williams and his titles, but after a far more competitive fight, Sprott was the victim of several low blows. When he complained to the referee he was controversially knocked out by a Williams left hook.

In January 2004, Sprott narrowly outpointed Williams in their third and final fight (115–114), lifting the British and Commonwealth titles. A few months later Williams would knockout Mike Tyson, however Sprott would lose his titles in his first defense, matched with fast undefeated Matt Skelton (12–0), Sprott was mauled and stopped in the 12th. His last fight of 2004 was a win against Czech heavyweight champ Robert Šulgan in Bethnal Green.

In 2005, Sprott would take the first of many trips abroad fighting top prospects, usually at short notice. In April he beat the German amateur star Cengiz Koc, but in October was beaten on points by Olympian Paolo Vidoz in a European title fight, both fights in Germany. In December he fought future European champ Vladimir Virchis in Austria, but was once-again the victim of a controversial decision loss.

In February 2006, he outboxed veteran Antoine Palatis in Scotland, but in a WBA Eliminator in July was hammered in 8 one-sided rounds by undefeated Ruslan Chagaev. Despite the loss he went back to Germany and beat a third German prospect when he upset undefeated southpaw Rene Dettweiler in November.

During his travels in Germany, Sprott had picked up the second-tier European Heavyweight title, the "EU" title, which he defended against 2000 Olympic Gold medallist Audley Harrison in London, February 2007. Harrison had demolished Danny Williams in his last fight and was on course to face Matt Skelton in a world title eliminator. A 9/2 underdog with most bookies, Sprott came off the floor in the 1st round to score a rare stoppage win by knocking Harrison clean out in the 3rd with a left hook; and seemingly ending his career.

On 14 July 2007, Sprott lost to Matt Skelton in a 12-round contest. The fight was of a very poor standard with Skelton winning on points.

On 31 May 2008, Sprott travelled to Germany to face hot prospect, and the WBA's #4 ranked contender Taras Bidenko. Sprott was outpointed in a 10-round unanimous decision, with 2 judges scoring the bout 97–93, and the other seeing it 97–94.

On 14 March 2009, Sprott fought former WBO heavyweight champion Lamon Brewster and lost a unanimous decision.

He fought Alexander Ustinov on 20 June 2009, but lost by unanimous decision after ten rounds. However he beat German Werner Kreiskott by round 1 TKO in March 2010 and this earned him a shot at the vacant European Boxing Union title against old foe Audley Harrison at Alexandra Palace in April 2010. Sprott was leading the bout on all three scorecards before Harrison knocked out Sprott with seconds remaining of round 12.

On 9 October 2010, a 35-year-old Sprott competed in Sky Sports' Prizefighter series (Heavyweights), reaching the final where he fought Matt Skelton in a three round contest. It was third time lucky for Sprott, who had lost his previous 2 fights with the 43-year-old Skelton, as Sprott won via split decision. One judge scored the fight 29–28 in favour of Skelton, while the other two judges both scored it 29–28 to Sprott, with Sprott winning £32,000 in 'winner take all' prize money. In September 2011, he suffered a third defeat in a European heavyweight title bout when he lost a unanimous points decision to Ukrainian Alexander Dimitrenko in Hamburg.

== Outside the ring ==
Michael Sprott has a son called Darnell born around 2001. Darnell's name is stitched on the shorts Sprott wears for his professional contests. In recent contests Sprott's shorts have also displayed the name of his late sister Ginette, who took her own life in September 2009 after a long battle with depression.

He lists his hobbies as weights, travelling and meeting new people. Outside boxing, Sprott enjoys rugby and the Wimbledon Championships. His favourite football teams are Reading FC and Arsenal F.C.

== Professional boxing record ==
71 fights	42 wins	29 losses
By knockout	17	18
By decision	25	11

No.	Result	Record	Opponent	Type	Round, time	Date	Location	Notes
71	Loss	42–29	Lukasz Rozanski	TKO	2 (6), 0:24	2 Jun 2018	G2A Arena, Jasionka 953, Rzeszów, Poland	
70	Loss	42–28	Ali Eren Demirezen	TKO	5 (8), 2:59	23 Dec 2017	Silence Hotel, Istanbul, Turkey	
69	Loss	42–27	Marcin Siwy	UD	6	5 Nov 2016	Hala ICDS, ul. Staszica 2, Lomianki, Poland	
68	Loss	42–26	Christian Hammer	KO	1 (10), 1:51	18 Mar 2016	Circus, Bucharest, Romania	
67	Loss	42–25	Adrian Granat	KO	1 (8), 2:55	5 Dec 2015	Inselparkhalle, Hamburg, Germany	
66	Loss	42–24	Carlos Takam	KO	5 (8)	13 Jun 2015	Cirque d'Hiver, Paris, France	
65	Loss	42–23	Anthony Joshua	TKO	1 (10), 1:26	22 Nov 2014	Echo Arena, Liverpool, England	
64	Loss	42–22	Kali Meehan	KO	1 (3)	4 Jun 2014	The Trusts Arena, Auckland, New Zealand	Super 8 Heavyweight Tournament - Final
63	Win	42–21	Anthony Nansen	UD	3	4 Jun 2014	The Trusts Arena, Auckland, New Zealand	Super 8 Heavyweight Tournament - Semi-final
62	Win	41–21	Martin Rogan	MD	3	4 Jun 2014	The Trusts Arena, Auckland, New Zealand	Super 8 Heavyweight Tournament - Quarter-final
61	Win	40–21	Jason Gavern	UD	3	14 Nov 2013	York Hall, London, England	Prizefighter 32: UK vs. USA International Heavyweights - Final
60	Win	39–21	Brian Minto	UD	3	14 Nov 2013	York Hall, London, England	Prizefighter 32: UK vs. USA International Heavyweights - Semi-final
59	Win	38–21	Damian Wills	UD	3	14 Nov 2013	York Hall, London, England	Prizefighter 32: UK vs. USA International Heavyweights - Quarter-final
58	Loss	37–21	Erkan Teper	TKO	1 (10), 2:41	31 Aug 2013	Münsterplatz, Basel, Switzerland	
57	Loss	37–20	Robert Helenius	UD	10	23 Mar 2013	GETEC Arena, Magdeburg, Germany	
56	Win	37–19	Edmund Gerber	MD	10	15 Dec 2012	Arena Nürnberger Versicherung, Nuremberg, Germany	
55	Loss	36–19	Edmund Gerber	TKO	4 (8), 2:41	15 Sep 2012	Baden-Arena, Offenburg, Germany	
54	Loss	36–18	Kubrat Pulev	RTD	9 (12), 3:00	14 Jan 2012	Baden-Arena, Offenburg, Germany	For IBF International heavyweight title
53	Loss	36–17	Alexander Dimitrenko	UD	12	24 Sep 2011	Dima-Sportcenter, Hamburg, Germany	For European heavyweight title
52	Loss	36–16	Tye Fields	SD	3	7 May 2011	Alexandra Palace, London, England	Prizefighter 18: The International Heavyweights - Quarter-final
51	Win	36–15	Serdar Uysal	UD	4	19 Mar 2011	Lanxess-Arena, Cologne, Germany	
50	Win	35–15	Matt Skelton	SD	3	9 Oct 2010	York Hall, London, England	Prizefighter 14: The Heavyweights IV - Final
49	Win	34–15	Shane McPhilbin	UD	3	9 Oct 2010	York Hall, London, England	Prizefighter 14: The Heavyweights IV - Semi-final
48	Win	33–15	Danny Hughes	UD	3	9 Oct 2010	York Hall, London, England	Prizefighter 14: The Heavyweights IV - Quarter-final
47	Loss	32–15	Audley Harrison	KO	12 (12), 1:05	9 Apr 2010	Alexandra Palace, London, England	For vacant European heavyweight title
46	Win	32–14	Werner Kreiskott	TKO	1 (4)	20 Mar 2010	Esprit Arena, Düsseldorf, Germany	
45	Loss	31–14	Alexander Ustinov	UD	10	20 Jun 2006	Veltins Arena, Gelsenkirchen, Germany	
44	Loss	31–13	Lamon Brewster	UD	8	14 Mar 2009	Ostseehalle, Kiel, Germany	
43	Win	31–12	Zack Page	PTS	6	19 Nov 2008	Royal Lancaster Hotel, London, England	
42	Loss	30–12	Taras Bydenko	UD	10	31 May 2008	Burg-Waechter Castello, Düsseldorf, Germany	
41	Loss	30–11	Matt Skelton	MD	12	14 Jul 2007	O2 Arena (Millennium Dome), London, England	For Commonwealth heavyweight title
40	Win	30–10	Audley Harrison	KO	3 (12), 3:00	17 Feb 2007	The Arena, London, England	Retained European Union heavyweight title; Won vacant English heavyweight title
39	Win	29–10	Rene Dettweiler	SD	12	4 Nov 2006	RWE Rhein-Ruhr Sporthalle, Mülheim, Germany	Retained European Union heavyweight title
38	Loss	28–10	Ruslan Chagaev	TKO	8 (12), 2:54	15 Jul 2006	Color Line Arena, Hamburg, Germany	For WBA Inter-Continental, and vacant WBO Asia Pacific heavyweight titles
37	Win	28–9	Antoine Palatis	UD	10	18 Feb 2006	Meadowbank Sports Centre, Edinburgh, Scotland	Won vacant European Union heavyweight title
36	Loss	27–9	Volodymyr Vyrchys	UD	12	13 Dec 2005	Freizeit Arena, Soelden, Austria	For WBO Inter-Continental heavyweight title
35	Loss	27–8	Paolo Vidoz	UD	12	1 Oct 2005	EWE-Arena, Oldenburg, Germany	For European heavyweight title
34	Win	27–7	Cengiz Koc	SD	10	23 Apr 2005	Arena Westfalenhalle, Dortmund, Germany	Won vacant European Union heavyweight title
33	Win	26–7	Robert Sulgan	TKO	1 (8), 0:52	10 Sep 2004	York Hall, London, England	
32	Loss	25–7	Matt Skelton	KO	12 (12), 0:56	24 Apr 2004	Rivermead Leisure Centre, Reading, England	Lost British and Commonwealth heavyweight titles
31	Win	25–6	Danny Williams	PTS	12	24 Jan 2004	Wembley Conference Centre, London, England	Won British and Commonwealth heavyweight titles
30	Loss	24–6	Danny Williams	TKO	5 (12), 0:19	26 Sep 2003	Rivermead Leisure Centre, Reading, England	For British and Commonwealth heavyweight titles
29	Win	24–5	Colin Kenna	TKO	1 (10), 1:28	1 Aug 2003	York Hall, London, England	Retained Southern Area heavyweight title
28	Win	23–5	Petr Horacek	KO	1 (6), 2:14	10 Jun 2003	Ponds Forge Arena, Sheffield, England	
27	Win	22–5	Mark Potter	TKO	3 (10), 1:25	18 Mar 2003	Rivermead Leisure Centre, Reading, England	Won vacant Southern Area heavyweight title
26	Win	21–5	Mike Holden	TKO	4 (8), 0:50	24 Jan 2003	Ponds Forge Arena, Sheffield, England	
25	Win	20–5	Tamas Feheri	TKO	2 (6), 0:26	12 Dec 2002	Equinox Nightclub, London, England	
24	Win	19–5	Derek McCafferty	PTS	8	17 Sep 2007	York Hall, London, England	
23	Win	18–5	Garing Lane	PTS	6	10 Jul 2002	Wembley Conference Centre, London, England	
22	Win	17–5	Pele Reid	TKO	7 (10), 2:53	9 May 2002	Equinox Nightclub, London, England	Won vacant WBF European heavyweight title
21	Loss	16–5	Danny Williams	RTD	7 (12), 0:26	12 Feb 2002	York Hall, London, England	For British and Commonwealth heavyweight titles
20	Win	16–4	Jermell Barnes	PTS	8	20 Dec 2001	Topsportcentrum, Rotterdam, Netherlands	
19	Loss	15–4	Corrie Sanders	KO	1 (8), 1:25	3 Nov 2001	Carnival City, Brakpan, South Africa	
18	Loss	15–3	Timo Hoffmann	UD	8	24 Mar 2001	Bordelandhalle, Magdeburg, Germany	
17	Win	15–2	Timo Hoffmann	PTS	8	17 Feb 2001	York Hall, London, England	
16	Loss	14–2	Wayne Llewellyn	TKO	3 (6)	14 Oct 2000	Conference Centre, London, England	
15	Win	14–1	Tony Booth	PTS	6	18 Jan 2000	Leisure Centre, Mansfield, England	
14	Win	13–1	Chris Woollas	RTD	4 (6), 0:52	10 Jul 1999	Elephant and Castle Centre, London, England	
13	Win	12–1	Gary Williams	PTS	6	16 Jan 1999	York Hall, London, England	
12	Loss	11–1	Harry Senior	TKO	6 (10), 1:40	12 Sep 1998	York Hall, London, England	For vacant Southern Area heavyweight title
11	Win	11–0	Michael Murray	PTS	6	14 Mar 1998	York Hall, London, England	
10	Win	10–0	Ray Kane	RTD	1 (6), 3:00	14 Feb 1998	Elephant and Castle Centre, London, England	
9	Win	9–0	Johnny Davison	TKO	2 (6), 1:45	10 Jan 1998	York Hall, London, England	
8	Win	8–0	Nick Howard	TKO	1 (4), 1:58	6 Dec 1997	The Arena, London, England	
7	Win	7–0	Darren Fearn	PTS	6	8 Nov 1997	Elephant and Castle Centre, London, England	
6	Win	6–0	Gary Williams	PTS	6	2 Sep 1997	Elephant and Castle Centre, London, England	
5	Win	5–0	Wladek Framas	PTS	6	20 May 1997	Picketts Lock Stadium, London, England	
4	Win	4–0	Tim Redman	KO	2 (4), 2:41	16 Apr 1997	York Hall, London, England	
3	Win	3–0	Alvin Miller	KO	1 (4), 2:00	17 Mar 1997	Marriott Hotel, London, England	
2	Win	2–0	Johnny Davison	KO	2 (6), 3:00	19 Feb 1997	Acton Town Hall, London, England	
1	Win	1–0	Geoff Hunter	TKO	1 (6)	20 Nov 1996	Wembley Conference Centre, London, England	
