= Volodymyr Virchis =

Ukrainian boxer (1973–2022)

Personal information
- Nickname: The Hunter
- Nationality: Ukrainian
- Born: Володимир Вірчіс; 18 August 1973 Kakhovka, Ukrainian SSR, Soviet Union
- Died: 28 January 2022 (aged 48) Kyiv, Ukraine
- Height: 6 ft 4.5 in (1.94 m)
- Weight: Heavyweight

Boxing career
- Reach: 80 in (203 cm)
- Stance: Orthodox

Boxing record
- Total fights: 28
- Wins: 26
- Win by KO: 21
- Losses: 2

Volodymyr Virchis (Ukrainian: Володимир Вірчіс; 18 August 1973 – 28 January 2022) was a Ukrainian professional boxer. Competing from 1999 to 2009, he held the European heavyweight title from 2006 to 2008.

== Life and career ==
Virchis, born in Kakhovka, Kherson Oblast, Ukrainian SSR, was known as "The Hunter." Large and powerful, he turned professional in 1999 and won his first 20 bouts with 17 knockouts, including victories over club fighters Julius Francis, Cliff Couser, and Michael Sprott.

Virchis' career was sidetracked in 2007 when he faced undefeated amateur star Ruslan Chagaev and lost a controversial majority decision. Later that same year, he rebounded by knocking out European champion, Paolo Vidoz.

In late 2008 Virchis lost a decision to Juan Carlos Gomez. Virchis had alcohol before the match, and he was drunk while fighting. After the loss a disappointed Virchis announced his retirement from the sport.

On the night from 27 to 28 January 2022, Virchis' was found dead of suicide by hanging on Raisa Okipna Street in Kyiv. He was 48, and his body was identified by his wife.

== Professional boxing record ==
26 Wins (21 knockouts, 5 decisions) 2 Losses (2 decisions)
Result	Opp; Record	Opponent	Type	Round	Date	Location	Notes
Win	19-19	(Latvia) Edgars Kalnārs	UD	6	24 October 2009	(Germany) Kugelbake Halle, Cuxhaven, Lower Saxony	
Loss	43-1	(Cuba) Juan Carlos Gómez	UD	12	27 September 2008	(Germany) Color Line Arena, Altona, Hamburg	
Win	22-9	(United States) Robert Hawkins	KO	5	17 November 2007	(Germany) Bordelandhalle, Magdeburg, Saxony-Anhalt	
Win	23-3	(Italy) Paolo Vidoz	UD	12	19 May 2007	(Germany) Color Line Arena, Altona, Hamburg	Retained European heavyweight title
Win	14-10	(Belarus) Ihar Shukala	TKO	1	23 February 2007	(Ukraine) Palace of Sports, Kyiv	
Win	16-11	(United States) Marcus McGee	KO	3	13 January 2007	(Germany) Brandberge Arena, Halle an der Saale, Saxony-Anhalt	
Win	21-2	(Italy) Paolo Vidoz	KO	6	15 July 2006	(Germany) Color Line Arena, Altona, Hamburg	Won European heavyweight title
Loss	19-0-1	(Uzbekistan) Ruslan Chagaev	MD	12	11 March 2006	(Germany) Color Line Arena, Altona, Hamburg	Lost WBO Intercontinental heavyweight title; For WBA Intercontinental heavyweight title
Win	27-8	(United Kingdom) Michael Sprott	UD	12	13 December 2005	(Austria) Freizeit Arena, Soelden	Retained WBO Intercontinental heavyweight title
Win	12-5-1	(Argentina) Lisandro Ezequiel Díaz	TKO	1	10 September 2005	(Germany) Dm-Arena, Karlsruhe, Baden-Württemberg	Retained WBO Intercontinental heavyweight title
Win	12-3	(Turkey) Adnan Serin	KO	1	10 May 2005	(Spain) Pueblo Espanol, Palma de Mallorca, Balearic Islands	
Win	14-1	(Ukraine) Taras Bidenko	TKO	12	29 March 2005	(Germany) Sporthalle, Wandsbek, Hamburg	Won WBO Intercontinental heavyweight title
Win	24-9-2	(United States) Cliff Couser	TKO	5	26 June 2004	(Ukraine) Zorianyi Hall, Feodosiya	Retained IBF Intercontinental heavyweight title
Win	17-1	(Russia) Balu Sauer	KO	8	31 January 2004	(Ukraine) Palace of Sports, Kyiv	Retained IBF Intercontinental heavyweight title
Win	23-12-1	(United Kingdom) Julius Francis	UD	12	6 September 2003	(Ukraine) Palace of Sports, Kyiv	Won IBF Intercontinental heavyweight title
Win	--	(Ukraine) Valeriy Klymenko	TKO	1	19 July 2003	(Ukraine) Oasis Entertaining Complex, Kyiv	
Win	4-3-1	(Algeria) Farhat Chaanoune	UD	8	31 May 2003	(Germany) Brandenburg Halle, Frankfurt, Brandenburg	
Win	9-10-1	(Belarus) Mihail Bekish	TKO	10	22 February 2003	(Ukraine) Circus, Kharkiv	Won WBC CISBB heavyweight title
Win	--	(Moldova) Igor Petrenco	TKO	2	28 September 2002	(Ukraine) Mykolaiv	
Win	27-11	(United States) Thomas Williams	KO	1	21 September 2002	(Ukraine) Circus, Kyiv	Won IBC Intercontinental heavyweight title
Win	19-17-1	(Ukraine) Yuriy Yelistratov	KO	1	23 March 2002	(Ukraine) Circus, Kyiv	Won Ukraine heavyweight title
Win	--	(Ukraine) Serhiy Ivanets	KO	2	15 June 2001	(Ukraine) Casino Bingo, Kyiv	
Win	--	(Ukraine) Roman Kapytonenko	KO	1	30 April 2001	(Ukraine) Circus, Kyiv	
Win	5-6	(Ukraine) Stanislav Tovkachov	RTD	3	27 January 2001	(Ukraine) Nadiya Sport Palace, Mykolaiv	
Win	2-2	(Ukraine) Oleksandr Myleiko	TKO	3	4 March 2000	(Ukraine) Kherson	
Win	0-1	(Tajikistan) Ruslan Qurbonov	TKO	2	16 January 2000	(Ukraine) Poltava	
Win	1-1	(Ukraine) Oleksandr Myleiko	TKO	5	16 October 1999	(Ukraine) Chernihiv	
Win	--	(Ukraine) Andriy Oliynyk	KO	2	24 August 1999	(Ukraine) Sumy	

Preceded by Paolo Vidoz	EBU Heavyweight Champion; 15 July 2006 – June 2008	Vacant Title next held by Sinan Samil Sam
