= Gonzalo Basile =

Argentine boxer

Gonzalo Omar Basile
Personal information
- Nickname: El Paton
- Born: Gonzalo Omar Basile; March 30, 1974 (age 52) Monte Grande, Argentina
- Height: 6 ft 6 in (198 cm)
- Weight: Heavyweight

Boxing career
- Reach: 74 in (190 cm)
- Stance: Orthodox

Boxing record
- Total fights: 88
- Wins: 75
- Win by KO: 36
- Losses: 12
- Draws: 0
- No contests: 1

Gonzalo Omar Basile (born March 30, 1974) is an Argentine professional boxer and truck driver who befriended the syndicalist Hugo Moyano, who is sponsoring his boxing career in the Heavyweight division. As of July 2013, Gonzalo was the WBC Latino Heavyweight Champion.

On April 20, 2019, Basile added the South American Heavyweight title by knocking out Julio Enrique Cuellar Cabrera of Bolivia, who was 13-6 coming into their rematch fight, in the third round at Luis Guillon, Argentina.

== Professional career ==
On October 28, 2006, Gonzalo fought against Alexander Dimitrenko for the WBO Inter-Continental Heavyweight title and lost in a first-round knockout. Basile vs Fres Oquendo was set for June 26, 2009 in Chicago. In the end, the fight did not happen. Promoter Dominic Pesoli said, "There’s just too many complications bringing Basile in from Argentina". On June 6, 2012 Gonzalo had the chance to fight for the Vacant WBC Baltic Silver heavyweight title against Artur Szpilka, but "El Paton" was no opponent for Artur, and he lost by KO on the 4 round.

On February 27, 2021, Basile won the little regarded, Universal Boxing Organization's International (not world) Heavyweight title, which was vacant previously, by knocking out Gilberto Matheus Domingos, who was 22-12 in 34 previous contests, in round one of a scheduled ten rounds fight, at the Coliseu Boxe Centre in Guarulhos, Brazil. With that win, he also earned the little regarded American Boxing Federation American west Heavyweight title, which was also vacant. This fight was a rematch; Basile had recently before beaten Domingos by second-round knockout in Argentina.

== Professional boxing record ==
| 91 fights | 76 wins | 14 losses |
|---|---|---|
| By knockout | 37 | 9 |
| By decision | 36 | 5 |
| By disqualification | 3 | 0 |
| No contests | 1 | |

| No. | Result | Record | Opponent | Type | Round, time | Date | Location | Notes |
|---|---|---|---|---|---|---|---|---|
| 91 | Win | 76-14 (1) | (Brazil) Gilberto Matheus Domingos | TKO | 1 (10) | 2021-02-27 | Coliseu Boxe Centre, Guarulhos, Brazil | Won vacant UBO International heavyweight title. Vacant American Boxing Federation American West heavyweight title |
| 90 | Loss | 75-14 (1) | (Argentina) Angel Gustavo Schmitt | UD | 6 (6) | 2020-10-30 | Club Atletico, Social y Deportivo-Complejo Gillon Luis Guillon, Argentina | |
| 89 | Loss | 75-13 (1) | (Brazil) Francisco Rodrigo Simoes de Almeida | TKO | 1 (10) | 2020-02-15 | Facultade Uni Santanna, São Paulo, Brazil | For vacant UBO Inter Continental heavyweight title. |
| 88 | Win | 75–12 (1) | (Brazil) Gilberto Matheus Domingos | TKO | 2 (12) | 2019-12-27 | C. A. Social y Dep. Camioneros, Buenos Aires, Argentina | Retained South American heavyweight title. |
| 87 | Win | 74–12 (1) | (Bolivia) Julio Enrique Cuellar Cabrera | TKO | 3 (12) | 2019-04-20 | Centro Recreativo Pasteleros, Buenos Aires, Argentina | Won vacant South American heavyweight title. |
| 86 | Win | 73–12 (1) | (Argentina) Cristhian Nazareno Fernandez | TKO | 2 (6) | 2018-05-24 | Asociación de Fomento Social y Deportiva Mayo, Buenos Aires, Argentina | |
| 85 | Win | 72–12 (1) | (Bolivia) Julio Enrique Cuellar Cabrera | KO | 1 (10), 0:38 | 2017-12-14 | Club Social y Deportivo Renacimiento, Villa Domínico, Argentina | |
| 84 | Win | 71–12 (1) | (Slovakia) Stefan Kusnier | DQ | 5 (6) | 2017-11-11 | Gimnasio del Rayo Vallecano, Madrid, Spain | Kusiner disqualified after landing numerous illegal strikes throughout the fight. |
| 83 | Win | 70–12 (1) | (Czech Republic) Pavel Siska | TKO | 2 (6), 2:55 | 2017-07-08 | LEO's Boxgym, Munich, Germany | |
| 82 | Win | 69–12 (1) | (Uruguay) Yuberti Suarez Diaz | UD | 6 | 2017-04-15 | Estadio F.A.B., Buenos Aires, Argentina | |
| 81 | Loss | 68–12 (1) | (Finland) Robert Helenius | TKO | 1 (12), 0:48 | 2016-12-17 | Hartwall Arena, Helsinki, Finland | |
| 80 | Win | 68–11 (1) | (Argentina) Christian Nazareno Fernandez | UD | 6 | 2016-02-20 | Estadio F.A.B., Buenos Aires, Argentina | |
| 79 | Win | 67–11 (1) | (Uruguay) Yuberty Suarez Diaz | KO | 5 (6) | 2015-12-12 | C. A. Social y Dep. Camioneros, Buenos Aires, Argentina | |
| 78 | Win | 66–11 (1) | (Argentina) Miguel Angel Morales | UD | 6 | 2015-04-25 | Club Union y Progreso, Tandil, Argentina | |
| 77 | Win | 65–11 (1) | (Slovenia) Mario Lakatos | DQ | 3 (6) | 2015-03-27 | Pabellon La Casilla, Bilbao, Spain | |
| 76 | Win | 64–11 (1) | (Argentina) Mateus Roberto Osorio | TKO | 3 (6), 0:54 | 2015-03-07 | Ce.De.M. N° 2, Caseros, Buenos Aires, Argentina | |
| 75 | Loss | 63–11 (1) | (Argentina) Walter David Cabral | UD | 6 | 2014-11-29 | C. A. Social y Dep. Camioneros, Buenos Aires, Argentina | |
| 74 | Loss | 63–10 (1) | (Argentina) Nelson Dario Dominguez | SD | 8 | 2014-10-10 | Complejo Ingenierio Knudsen, Caleta Olivia, Santa Cruz, Argentina | |
| 73 | Loss | 63–9 (1) | (Argentina) Walter David Cabral | SD | 6 | 2014-08-15 | Polideportivo CEF Nº 40, Mercedes, Buenos Aires, Argentina | |
| 72 | Win | 63–8 (1) | (Argentina) Victor Dario Gimenez | UD | 10 | 2014-06-19 | C. A. Social y Dep. Camioneros, Buenos Aires, Argentina | Won interim WBC Mundo Hispano heavyweight title. |
| 71 | Win | 62–8 (1) | (Latvia) Vitalijs Zakirko | KO | 1 (6) | 2014-05-02 | PalaSidermec, Gatteo, Italy | |
| 70 | Win | 61–8 (1) | (Argentina) Aldredo Brígido Ruíz Díaz | UD | 10 | 2013-12-14 | Polideportivo Municipal, Monte Hermoso, Argentina | Retained IBF Latino heavyweight title. |
| 69 | Win | 60–8 (1) | (Argentina) Martin David Islas | UD | 6 | 2013-10-04 | Club Sportivo America, Rosario, Santa Fe, Argentina | |
| 68 | Win | 59–8 (1) | (Argentina) Victor Dario Gimenez | TKO | 7 (10), 0:19 | 2013-06-15 | Centro Recreativo Pasteleros, Buenos Aires, Argentina | Won vacant IBF Latino heavyweight title. |
| 67 | Win | 58–8 (1) | (Argentina) Aldredo Brígido Ruíz Díaz | UD | 10 | 2013-02-16 | Club Colon, Montevideo, Uruguay | Retained interim WBC Latino heavyweight title. |
| 66 | Win | 57–8 (1) | (Mexico) Jose Carlos Rodriguez | KO | 5 (6) | 2012-11-30 | Foro Polanco, Polanco, Mexico | |
| 65 | Win | 56–8 (1) | (Argentina) Martin David Islas | UD | 6 | 2012-10-21 | Polideportivo Municipal, Entre Ríos, Argentina | |
| 64 | Loss | 55–8 (1) | (Argentina) Luis Oscar Juarez | TKO | 3 (4) | 2012-09-08 | Centro Recreativo Pasteleros, Buenos Aires, Argentina | |
| 63 | Win | 55–7 (1) | (Argentina) Marcelo Ulises Ponce | TKO | 4 (10) | 2012-08-10 | Club Parque Sur, Concepción del Uruguay, Entre Ríos, Argentina | |
| 62 | Loss | 54–7 (1) | (Poland) Artur Szpilka | KO | 4 (10), 1:43 | 2012-06-02 | Hala Luczniczka, ul. Toruńska 59, Bydgoszcz, Poland | For vacant WBC Youth Silver heavyweight title. For vacant WBC Baltic Silver heavyweight title. |
| 61 | Win | 54–6 (1) | (Brazil) Ademar Leonardo Correa | KO | 1 (6) | 2012-04-07 | Club Atlético y Soc. Villa Calzada, Rafael Calzada, Buenos Aires, Argentina | |
| 60 | Win | 53–6 (1) | (Uruguay) Jose Maria Rodriguez Oliveira | KO | 2 (8) | 2011-12-16 | Polideportivo Municipal, Monte Hermoso, Argentina | |
| 59 | Loss | 52–6 (1) | (Argentina) Emilio Ezequiel Zárate | SD | 8 | 2011-11-05 | Club Banco Provincia, City Bell, Buenos Aires, Argentina | |
| 58 | Win | 52–5 (1) | (Argentina) Manuel Alberto Pucheta | UD | 12 | 2011-09-17 | Ce.De.M. N° 2, Caseros, Buenos Aires, Argentina | Won interim WBO Latino heavyweight title. |
| 57 | Win | 51–5 (1) | (Argentina) Miguel Ángel Morales | UD | 10 | 2011-06-04 | Ce.De.M. N° 1, Caseros, Buenos Aires, Argentina | Retained interim WBC Latino heavyweight title. |
| 56 | Win | 50–5 (1) | (Argentina) Manuel Alberto Pucheta | SD | 8 | 2011-04-30 | Club Once Unidos, Mar del Plata, Argentina | |
| 55 | Win | 49–5 (1) | (Argentina) Emilio Ezequiel Zárate | UD | 6 | 2011-03-11 | Ce.De.M. N° 2, Caseros, Buenos Aires, Argentina | |
| 54 | Loss | 48–5 (1) | (Brazil) Marcelo Nascimento | TKO | 1 (12), 0:34 | 2010-10-23 | Escuela Técnica Nº 1, Salta, Argentina | Lost WBO Latino heavyweight title. |
| 53 | Win | 48–4 (1) | (Brazil) Daniel Bispo | UD | 6 | 2010-09-04 | Club Once Unidos, Mar del Plata, Argentina | |
| 52 | Win | 47–4 (1) | (Brazil) Daniel Bispo | UD | 10 | 2010-07-23 | Parque Municipal Eva Perón, Lomas de Zamora, Argentina | Retained interim WBC Latino and WBC Mundo Hispano heavyweight titles. |
| 51 | Win | 46–4 (1) | (Brazil) Kleber Giovanne Souza Pereira | KO | 2 (6), 1:39 | 2010-05-29 | Club Once Unidos, Mar del Plata, Argentina | |
| 50 | Win | 45–4 (1) | (Slovenia) Ladislav Slezak | TKO | 1 (6) | 2010-04-09 | Tivoli Arena, Ljubljana, Slovenia | |
| 49 | Win | 44–4 (1) | (Bolivia) Roberto Santa Cruz Justiniano | KO | 1 (6), 0:41 | 2010-01-23 | Club Once Unidos, Mar del Plata, Argentina | |
| 48 | Win | 43–4 (1) | (Argentina) Miguel Ángel Morales | UD | 10 | 2009-12-17 | Estadio Tomás Adolfo Ducó, Buenos Aires, Argentina | Retained interim WBC Latino heavyweight title. |
| 47 | Win | 42–4 (1) | (Bolivia) Saul Farah | TKO | 8 (12), 2:59 | 2009-11-13 | Estadio Tomás Adolfo Ducó, Buenos Aires, Argentina | Won vacant WBC Mundo Hispano heavyweight title. Retained interim WBC Latino heavyweight title. |
| 46 | Win | 41–4 (1) | (Ecuador) Hugo Anibal Abad | TKO | 2 (10), 0:29 | 2009-04-30 | Luna Park, Buenos Aires, Argentina | Retained the interim WBC Latino heavyweight title. |
| 45 | Win | 40–4 (1) | (Argentina) Sergio Martin Beaz | UD | 6 | 2009-03-21 | Sociedad Rural, Junín, Buenos Aires, Argentina | |
| 44 | Win | 39–4 (1) | (Brazil) Daniel Frank | TKO | 3 (12), 1:45 | 2009-02-14 | Club Once Unidos, Mar del Plata, Argentina | Retained WBO Latino heavyweight title. |
| 43 | Win | 38–4 (1) | (Argentina) Cesar Gustavo Acevedo | KO | 2 (6), 1:18 | 2009-01-17 | Polideportivo Municipal, Monte Hermoso, Argentina | |
| 42 | Win | 37–4 (1) | (Argentina) Sergio Martin Beaz | UD | 8 | 2008-12-12 | Club El Riojano, Balcarce, Buenos Aires, Argentina | |
| 41 | Win | 36–4 (1) | (Argentina) Dany Lobo | RTD | 4 (10), 2:58 | 2008-11-14 | Unión de Padres Los Toritos, Monte Grande, Argentina | Retained interim WBC Latino heavyweight title. |
| 40 | Win | 35–4 (1) | (Brazil) Raphael Zumbano Love | UD | 12 | 2008-09-26 | Ce.De.M. N° 2, Caseros, Buenos Aires, Argentina | Won vacant WBO Latino heavyweight title. |
| 39 | Win | 34–4 (1) | (Brazil) Ademar Leonardo Correa | KO | 4 (10), 1:31 | 2008-08-15 | Unión de Padres Los Toritos, Monte Grande, Argentina | Retained interim WBC Mundo Hispano heavyweight title. |
| 38 | Win | 33–4 (1) | (Argentina) Claudio Roque Fernandez | UD | 10 | 2008-07-11 | Unión de Padres Los Toritos, Monte Grande, Argentina | Retained interim WBC Latino heavyweight title. |
| 37 | Loss | 32–4 (1) | (Argentina) Cesar Gustavo Acevedo | TKO | 5 (12), 1:30 | 2008-04-26 | Ce.De.M. N° 2, Caseros, Buenos Aires, Argentina | For South American heavyweight title. |
| 36 | Win | 32–3 (1) | (Brazil) Mauro Aparecido Gomes | TKO | 2 (10), 1:04 | 2008-03-14 | Sociedad de Fomento Rafael Castillo, Rafael Castillo, Buenos Aires, Argentina | Won interim WBC Latino heavyweight title. |
| 35 | Win | 31–3 (1) | (Brazil) Aldo Moreira da Silva | UD | 6 | 2007-12-21 | Deportivo Morón, Morón, Buenos Aires, Argentina | |
| 34 | Loss | 30–3 (1) | (Argentina) Cesar Gustavo Acevedo | KO | 1 (12), 1:30 | 2007-11-17 | Estadio Libertadores de América, Avellaneda, Argentina | For vacant South American heavyweight title. |
| 33 | Win | 30–2 (1) | (Argentina) Ademar Leonardo Correa | UD | 6 | 2007-07-06 | Club Social y Deportivo Colon, Chivilcoy, Argentina | |
| 32 | Win | 29–2 (1) | (Brazil) Marcos Celestino | KO | 2 (10) | 2007-03-31 | Deportivo Morón, Morón, Buenos Aires, Argentina | Retained WBC Mundo Hispano heavyweight title. |
| 31 | Win | 28–2 (1) | (Argentina) Sergio Martin Beaz | SD | 6 | 2007-02-10 | Club El Inca, Buenos Aires, Argentina | |
| 30 | Win | 27–2 (1) | (Argentina) Luis Oscar Ricall | UD | 6 | 2007-01-13 | Club Atletico Quilmes, Mar del Plata, Argentina | |
| 29 | Win | 26–2 (1) | (Argentina) Cesar Gustavo Acevedo | SD | 6 | 2006-12-16 | Estadio Libertadores de América, Avellaneda, Argentina | |
| 28 | Loss | 25–2 (1) | (Germany) Alexander Dimitrenko | TKO | 1 (12), 0:54 | 2006-10-28 | Porsche-Arena, Stuttgart, Germany | For WBO Inter-Continental heavyweight title |
| 27 | Win | 25–1 (1) | (Brazil) Edegar Da Silva | UD | 10 | 2006-08-11 | Estadio Tomás Adolfo Ducó, Buenos Aires, Argentina | |
| 26 | Win | 24–1 (1) | (Argentina) Mariano Ramon Ocampo | UD | 8 | 2006-07-12 | Estadio Libertadores de América, Avellaneda, Argentina | |
| 25 | Win | 23–1 (1) | (Argentina) Ricardo Zenon Pereyra | KO | 1 (10) | 2006-06-08 | Club 22 de Octubre, Chivilcoy, Argentina | |
| 24 | Win | 22–1 (1) | (Argentina) Cristian Adrian Armando Zamudio | TKO | 3 (10) | 2006-05-19 | Casino Parque Hotel, Montevideo, Uruguay | |
| 23 | Win | 21–1 (1) | (Argentina) Sebastian Ignacio Ceballos | UD | 8 | 2006-05-05 | Deportivo Morón, Morón, Buenos Aires, Argentina | |
| 22 | Win | 20–1 (1) | (Argentina) Miguel Angel Antonio Aguirre | UD | 8 | 2006-04-21 | Deportivo Morón, Morón, Buenos Aires, Argentina | |
| 21 | Win | 19–1 (1) | (Argentina) Miguel Angel Morales | UD | 10 | 2006-04-07 | Unión de Padres Los Toritos, Monte Grande, Argentina | |
| 20 | Win | 18–1 (1) | (Argentina) Luis Oscar Ricail | UD | 10 | 2006-03-18 | Estadio Libertadores de América, Avellaneda, Argentina | Won interim WBC Mundo Hispano heavyweight title. |
| 19 | Win | 17–1 (1) | (Argentina) Claudio Carlos Roque Fernandez | TKO | 8 (8), 1:33 | 2006-02-24 | Club Independiente, Beccar, Argentina | |
| 18 | Win | 16–1 (1) | (Argentina) Adolfo Marcelo Trinidad | RTD | 3 (10), 2:10 | 2006-02-10 | Club 22 de Octubre, Chivilcoy, Argentina | |
| 17 | Win | 15–1 (1) | (Argentina) Fernando Sebastian Santander | KO | 2 (10), 0:25 | 2006-01-27 | Club Atletico Quilmes, Mar del Plata, Argentina | |
| 16 | Win | 14–1 (1) | (Brazil) Edegar Da Silva | KO | 3 (10), 2:50 | 2005-12-16 | Estadio Libertadores de América, Avellaneda, Argentina | Won the Ricardo Enrique Bochini Cup. |
| 15 | Win | 13–1 (1) | (Brazil) Jucimar Francisco Hipolito | DQ | 2 (8) | 2005-12-02 | Instituto Provincial del Deporte, Posadas, Misiones, Argentina | Hipolito disqualified for fighting after break. |
| 14 | Win | 12–1 (1) | (Argentina) Jose Enrique Villarreal | UD | 8 | 2005-11-18 | Club Social y Deportivo Colon, Chivilcoy, Argentina | |
| 13 | Win | 11–1 (1) | (Brazil) Emerson Naja | KO | 1 (8) | 2005-11-04 | Club Atletico Ciclon, Chivilcoy, Argentina | |
| 12 | Win | 10–1 (1) | (Argentina) Sergio Martin Beaz | UD | 6 | 2005-10-14 | Estadio Libertadores de América, Avellaneda, Argentina | |
| 11 | Win | 9–1 (1) | (Argentina) Fernando Sebastian Santander | KO | 1 (6) | 2005-09-23 | Club Porteno, Bragado, Bragado, Argentina | |
| 10 | Win | 8–1 (1) | (Argentina) Jorge Mario Torres | UD | 6 | 2005-08-26 | Estadio Libertadores de América, Avellaneda, Argentina | |
| 9 | NC | 7–1 (1) | (Argentina) Fernando Sebastian Santander | NC | 1 (4) | 2005-08-12 | General Lavalle, Argentina | |
| 8 | Win | 7–1 | (Brazil) Adimilson Da Cruz | KO | 1 (4) | 2005-07-30 | S. Italiana Gabrielle D Anunnzio, Córdoba, Argentina | |
| 7 | Win | 6–1 | (Argentina) Mario Maximiliano Islas | KO | 1 (4) | 2005-07-17 | Club Atletico Quilmes, Mar del Plata, Argentina | |
| 6 | Win | 5–1 | (Paraguay) Victor Luis Britos Samudio | KO | 1 (4) | 2005-06-17 | Asociación Atlética Jorge Newbery, Rufino, Santa Fe, Argentina | |
| 5 | Win | 4–1 | (Paraguay) Victor Luis Britos Samudio | KO | 1 (4) | 2004-11-12 | Club Cepa, Pontevedra, Buenos Aires, Argentina | |
| 4 | Win | 3–1 | (Argentina) Mario Maximiliano Islas | UD | 4 | 2004-10-15 | Club Gimnasia Y Esgrima, Chivilcoy, Argentina | |
| 3 | Win | 2–1 | (Brazil) Everton Marques Ferreira | MD | 4 | 2004-08-06 | Gualeguaychú, Entre Ríos, Argentina | |
| 2 | Win | 1–1 | (Argentina) Sebastian Ignacio Ceballos | UD | 4 | 2004-06-05 | Ce.De.M. N° 2, Caseros, Buenos Aires, Argentina | |
| 1 | Loss | 0–1 | (Argentina) Mauro Adrian Ordiales | KO | 2 (4) | 2003-04-19 | Estadio F.A.B, Buenos Aires, Argentina | |
