= Albert Sosnowski =

Polish boxer (born 1979)

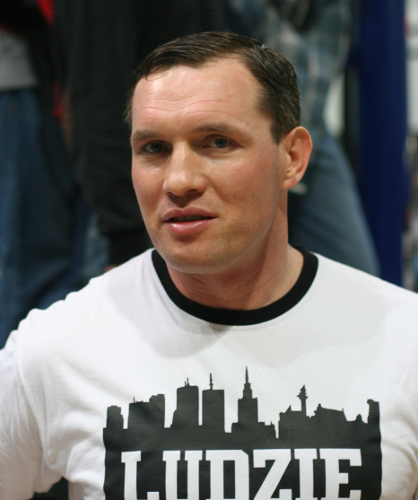
- Sosnowski in 2015

Personal information
- Nickname: The Dragon
- Nationality: Polish
- Born: Albert Dariusz Sosnowski; 7 March 1979 (age 47) Warsaw, Poland
- Height: 6 ft 2 1/2 in (189 cm)
- Weight: Heavyweight

Boxing career
- Reach: 77 in (196 cm)
- Stance: Orthodox

Boxing record
- Total fights: 60
- Wins: 49
- Win by KO: 29
- Losses: 9
- Draws: 2

Albert Dariusz Sosnowski (born 7 March 1979) is a Polish former professional boxer who competed from 1998 to 2017. He challenged once for the WBC heavyweight title in 2010. At regional level, he held the European heavyweight title from 2009 to 2010.

== Professional career ==
Sosnowski made his professional debut in July 1998, defeating Czech fighter Jan Drobena via first-round knockout in Outrup, Denmark. He won his first 19 fights, 12 wins by knockout.

In July 2001, Sosnowski fought for his first title belt against Canadian Arthur Cook in Budapest, Hungary, for the vacant WBC World Youth heavyweight title. Sosnowski, who was clearly ahead on points all scorecards, was knocked out by Cook in the ninth round to take the title.

In July 2008, Sosnowski lost to journeyman Zuri Lawrence, who had taken the fight on late notice but in November 2008 he defeated British fighter Danny Williams when Sosnowski himself was the underdog and he had taken the fight at late notice. He won by technical knockout after 1:17 of the 8th round.

He fought Francesco Pianeta for the EBU-EU heavyweight title on 4 April 2009 with the fight going to a draw after twelve rounds.

On 18 December 2009, Sosnowski defeated Paolo Vidoz for the EBU heavyweight title, winning by unanimous decision.

=== WBC heavyweight title challenge ===
He was subsequently lined up to face heavyweight Prizefighter series winner and former Olympic gold medallist, Audley Harrison for his first defence of the title, with the fight being scheduled for 9 April 2010. He cancelled this fight for a shot at Vitali Klitschko for his WBC title. Sosnowski lost to Klitschko by 10th-round knockout after being worn down by shots to the head throughout the fight.

== Professional boxing record ==
60 fights	49 wins	9 losses
By knockout	29	7
By decision	20	2
Draws	2	

Key to abbreviations used for results
DQ	Disqualification	RTD	Corner retirement
KO	Knockout	SD	Split decision / split draw
MD	Majority decision / majority draw	TD	Technical decision / technical draw
NC	No contest	TKO	Technical knockout
PTS	Points decision	UD	Unanimous decision / unanimous draw

Boxing record
No.	Result	Record	Opponent	Type	Round(s), time	Date	Location	Notes
60	Loss	49–9–2	Łukasz Różański	KO	1 (8), 2:00	9 Sep 2017	Czachor Brothers Stadium, Radom, Poland	
59	Loss	49–8–2	Andrzej Wawrzyk	RTD	5 (10), 3:00	17 Sep 2016	Ergo Arena, Gdańsk, Poland	For vacant Republic of Poland heavyweight title
58	Win	49–7–2	Andras Csomor	TKO	2 (8), 2:58	18 Mar 2016	Aqua Żyrardów, Żyrardów, Poland	
57	Loss	48–7–2	Marcin Rekowski	TKO	7 (10), 0:48	31 May 2014	Globus Hall, Lublin, Poland	For vacant Republic of Poland heavyweight title
56	Win	48–6–2	Wladimir Letr	TKO	1 (6), 2:00	26 Apr 2014	Legionowo Arena, Legionowo, Poland	
55	Loss	47–6–2	Martin Rogan	TKO	3 (3), 1:56	23 Feb 2013	York Hall, London, England	Prizefighter 29: heavyweight quarter-final
54	Loss	47–5–2	Kevin Johnson	SD	3	20 Jun 2012	York Hall, London, England	Prizefighter 25: heavyweight semi-final
53	Win	47–4–2	Maurice Harris	SD	3	20 Jun 2012	York Hall, London, England	Prizefighter 25: heavyweight quarter-final
52	Draw	46–4–2	Hastings Rasani	PTS	6	9 Nov 2011	York Hall, London, England	
51	Loss	46–4–1	Alexander Dimitrenko	KO	12 (12), 1:38	26 Mar 2011	Universum Gym, Hamburg, Germany	For European heavyweight title
50	Win	46–3–1	Paul Butlin	TKO	1 (8), 2:12	25 Sep 2010	Robin Park Centre, Wigan, England	
49	Loss	45–3–1	Vitali Klitschko	KO	10 (12), 2:30	29 May 2010	Veltins Arena, Gelsenkirchen, Germany	For WBC heavyweight title
48	Win	45–2–1	Paolo Vidoz	UD	12	18 Dec 2009	York Hall, London, England	Won vacant European heavyweight title
47	Draw	44–2–1	Francesco Pianeta	SD	12	4 May 2009	Burg-Waechter Castello, Düsseldorf, Germany	For European Union heavyweight title
46	Win	44–2	Danny Williams	TKO	8 (10), 1:17	8 Nov 2008	York Hall, London, England	
45	Loss	43–2	Zuri Lawrence	UD	8	6 Aug 2008	Aviator Sports Complex, New York City, New York, US	
44	Win	43–1	Terrell Nelson	TKO	5 (8), 0:52	25 Apr 2008	Utopia Paradise Theatre, New York City, US	
43	Win	42–1	Colin Kenna	PTS	10	25 Jan 2008	Goresbrook Leisure Centre, Dagenham, England	
42	Win	41–1	Manuel Alberto Pucheta	KO	2 (12), 1:41	15 Sep 2007	Fife Ice Arena, Kirkcaldy, Scotland	Retained WBF (Foundation) heavyweight title
41	Win	40–1	Steve Herelius	TKO	9 (10), 2:18	8 Jun 2007	Civic Centre, Motherwell, England	
40	Win	39–1	Lawrence Tauasa	MD	12	4 Nov 2006	Emperor's Palace, Kempton Park, Gauteng, South Africa	Won vacant WBF (Foundation) heavyweight title
39	Win	38–1	Osborne Machimana	UD	10	25 May 2006	Carnival City, Brakpan, Gauteng, South Africa	
38	Win	37–1	Orlin Norris	MD	6	28 May 2005	Staples Center, Los Angeles, US	
37	Win	36–1	Travis Fulton	TKO	2 (8), 1:29	19 Mar 2005	MGM Grand Garden Arena, Paradise, US	
36	Win	35–1	Tommy Connelly	TKO	2 (6), 1:25	22 Jan 2005	American Airlines Arena, Miami, US	
35	Win	34–1	Kenny Craven	KO	2 (8)	11 Sep 2004	Kisstadion, Budapest, Hungary	
34	Win	33–1	Wojciech Bartnik	PTS	6	26 Jun 2004	King's Hall, Belfast, Northern Ireland	
33	Win	32–1	Paul King	PTS	4	10 Apr 2004	Manchester Arena, Manchester, England	
32	Win	31–1	Greg Scott Briggs	KO	2 (6), 2:27	31 Jan 2004	York Hall, London, England	
31	Win	30–1	Chris Woollas	TKO	1 (6), 1:04	22 Nov 2003	King's Hall, Northern Ireland	
30	Win	29–1	Jason Brewster	TKO	2 (6), 0:57	5 Jul 2003	Leisure Centre, Brentwood, England	
29	Win	28–1	Mike Holden	PTS	6	12 Apr 2003	York Hall, London, England	
28	Win	27–1	Mindaugas Kulikauskas	TKO	2 (6), 0:39	8 Mar 2003	York Hall, London, England	
27	Win	26–1	Jacklord Jacobs	PTS	6	7 Dec 2002	Leisure Centre, Brentwood, England	
26	Win	25–1	Paul Bonson	PTS	4	27 Jul 2002	Harvey Hadden Leisure Centre, Nottingham, England	
25	Win	24–1	Jacob Odhiambo	KO	1 (6), 0:45	9 Mar 2002	E.M. Sporthall, Budapest, Hungary	
24	Win	23–1	Cătălin Zmărăndescu	KO	1 (4)	22 Jan 2002	Gdynia, Poland	
23	Win	22–1	Robert Măgureanu	TKO	4 (6)	27 Oct 2001	Kołobrzeg, Poland	
22	Win	21–1	Stanyslav Tomkachov	TKO	3 (6)	13 Oct 2001	FTC Handball-Hall, Budapest, Hungary	
21	Win	20–1	Dirk Wallyn	UD	6	7 Jul 2001	Jaap Edenhal, Amsterdam, Netherlands	
20	Loss	19–1	Arthur Cook	KO	9 (10), 2:21	17 Mar 2001	FTC Handball-Hall, Budapest, Hungary	For vacant WBC Youth heavyweight title
19	Win	19–0	Michael Murray	TKO	5 (6)	27 Nov 2000	Aston Villa Leisure Centre, Birmingham, England	
18	Win	18–0	Everett Martin	TKO	7 (8)	30 Sep 2000	Sportcomplex De Wilgenring, Rotterdam, Netherlands	
17	Win	17–0	Dan Conway	UD	4	19 Aug 2000	Foxwoods Resort, Ledyard, US	
16	Win	16–0	Clarence Goins	TKO	2 (6)	24 Jun 2000	Toruń, Poland	
15	Win	15–0	Neil Kirkwood	TKO	1 (6), 0:34	27 May 2000	Hilton Hotel, Mayfair, England	
14	Win	14–0	Slobodan Popovic	KO	1 (6)	8 Apr 2000	Gdańsk, Poland	
13	Win	13–0	Luke Simpkin	PTS	4	11 Mar 2000	Olympia, Kensington, England	
12	Win	12–0	Henry Kolle Njume	PTS	6	20 Nov 1999	Gliwice, Poland	
11	Win	11–0	Jeff Lally	TKO	3 (6), 1:22	22 Oct 1999	Joe Louis Arena, Detroit, US	
10	Win	10–0	Ignacio Orsola	KO	1 (6)	18 Sep 1999	Gdańsk, Poland	
9	Win	9–0	Bruno Foster	PTS	6	17 Jul 1999	Gdańsk, Poland	
8	Win	8–0	Biko Botowamungu	UD	4	26 Jun 1999	Hala Ludowa, Wrocław, Poland	
7	Win	7–0	Gary Williams	TKO	4 (4), 1:11	28 May 1999	Everton Park Sports Centre, Liverpool, England	
6	Win	6–0	Stipe Balic	PTS	4	17 Apr 1999	Warsaw, Poland	
5	Win	5–0	Chris Woollas	PTS	4	12 Mar 1999	York Hall, London, England	
4	Win	4–0	Viktor Juhász	TKO	1 (4)	13 Feb 1999	Jastrzębie-Zdrój, Poland	
3	Win	3–0	Rene Hanl	PTS	4	2 Oct 1998	Hala Ludowa, Wrocław, Poland	
2	Win	2–0	Andrzej Dziewulski	TKO	4 (4)	25 Sep 1998	Poznań, Poland	
1	Win	1–0	Jan Drobena	TKO	1 (4), 2:21	22 Jul 1998	Outrup Speedway Center, Outrup, Denmark	

Sporting positions
Continental boxing titles
Vacant Title last held by Matt Skelton	EBU Heavyweight Champion; December 18, 2009 – March 2010	Vacant Title next held by Audley Harrison
Minor world boxing titles
Vacant Title last held by Rob Calloway	WBF heavyweight champion 4 November 2006 – September 2007/July 2008; Vacated	Vacant Title next held by Frans Botha
