= Paul Butlin =

British boxer

Personal information
- Born: 16 March 1976 (age 50) Oakham, Rutland, England
- Height: 6 ft 1 1/2 in (187 cm)
- Weight: Heavyweight

Boxing career
- Stance: Orthodox

Boxing record
- Total fights: 41
- Wins: 16
- Win by KO: 3
- Losses: 24
- Draws: 1

Paul Butlin (born 16 March 1976) is a British former professional boxer who competed from 2002 to 2016, and has since worked as a bailiff.

== Professional career ==
On 11 April 2008 Butlin appeared in the Prizefighter competition on Sky Sports, beating Colin Kenna in the quarter final before losing to David Dolan in the semi-final on points.

He fought Derek Chisora on 22 May 2009 in a rematch but lost the fight on points. He then fought Johnathon Banks on 20 June, but lost the fight by KO in the seventh round.

Butlin lost to Polish heavyweight boxer Albert Sosnowski by TKO in first round on 25 September 2010.

He opened up a boxing gym called Hardknocks based in Melton Mowbray.

On 26 October 2013, Paul Butlin fought Olympic Gold Medalist Anthony Joshua at the Motorpoint Arena Sheffield, however the fight was stopped in the second round by the referee who declared Joshua the winner by TKO.

He also won the midland area title after he fought British champion Shane McPhilbin in 2015: Butlin won after McPhilbin was disqualified after punching repeatedly to the back of the head. He retired from boxing in June 2016.

== Life after boxing ==
Since retiring from the sport, Butlin has worked as a bailiff.

== Professional boxing record ==
| 279 fights | 143 wins | 102 losses |
|---|---|---|
| By knockout | 143 | 102 |
| By decision | 0 | 0 |
| By disqualification | 0 | 0 |
| Draws | 0 | |
| No contests | 34 | |

| No. | Result | Record | Opponent | Type | Round, time | Date | Location | Notes |
|---|---|---|---|---|---|---|---|---|
| 41 | Loss | 16–24–1 | Kash Ali | TKO | 4 (4), 2:57 | 4 Jun 2016 | York Hall, London, England | |
| 40 | Loss | 16–23–1 | Christian Lewandowski | KO | 3 (8), 2:02 | 6 Mar 2016 | Stadthalle, Greifswald, Germany | |
| 39 | Loss | 16–22–1 | Franz Rill | UD | 8 | 17 Jul 2015 | MHPArena, Ludwigsburg, Germany | |
| 38 | Loss | 16–21–1 | DL Jones | PTS | 4 | 14 Mar 2015 | Medway Park Sports Centre, Gillingham, England | |
| 37 | Draw | 16–20–1 | James Oliphant | PTS | 4 | 7 Nov 2014 | North Kesteven Centre, Lincoln, England | |
| 36 | Win | 16–20 | Shane McPhilbin | DQ | 4 (10), 2:10 | 17 May 2014 | North Kesteven Centre, Lincoln, England | Won vacant Midlands Area heavyweight title |
| 35 | Win | 15–20 | James Oliphant | PTS | 4 | 1 Mar 2014 | North Kesteven Centre, Lincoln, England | |
| 34 | Loss | 14–20 | Anthony Joshua | TKO | 2 (6), 0:50 | 26 Oct 2013 | Motorpoint Arena, Sheffield, England | |
| 33 | Loss | 14–19 | Gary Cornish | KO | 5 (10), 3:08 | 5 July 2013 | The Ironworks, Inverness, Scotland | For vacant International Masters heavyweight title |
| 32 | Loss | 14–18 | Dorian Darch | PTS | 4 | 4 May 2013 | Rhondda Fach Sports Centre, Tylorstown, Wales | |
| 31 | Win | 14–17 | Moses Matovu | PTS | 4 | 2 Mar 2013 | North Kesteven Centre, Lincoln, England | |
| 30 | Win | 13–17 | Paul Morris | PTS | 4 | 2 Nov 2012 | Magnus School Sports Centre, Newark, England | |
| 29 | Loss | 12–17 | Lucas Browne | TKO | 4 (6), 1:15 | 21 Apr 2012 | Sports Centre, Oldham, England | |
| 28 | Loss | 12–16 | Jarno Rosberg | UD | 6 | 23 Sep 2011 | Helsinki Ice Hall, Helsinki, Finland | |
| 27 | Loss | 12–15 | Edmund Gerber | UD | 8 | 12 Feb 2011 | Herning Kongrescenter, Herning, Denmark | |
| 26 | Loss | 12–14 | Larry Olubamiwo | TKO | 8 (10), 0:38 | 11 Dec 2010 | Echo Arena, Liverpool, England | For vacant International Masters heavyweight title |
| 25 | Loss | 12–13 | Johann Duhaupas | UD | 8 | 6 Nov 2010 | Salle bout du Monde, Geneva, Switzerland | |
| 24 | Loss | 12–12 | Albert Sosnowski | TKO | 1 (8), 2:12 | 25 Sep 2010 | Robin Park Centre, Wigan, England | |
| 23 | Loss | 12–11 | Andrzej Wawrzyk | UD | 8 | 15 May 2010 | Atlas Arena, Łódź, Poland | |
| 22 | Loss | 12–10 | Johnathon Banks | KO | 7 (8), 0:56 | 20 Jun 2009 | Veltins-Arena, Gelsenkirchen, Germany | |
| 21 | Loss | 12–9 | Derek Chisora | PTS | 8 | 22 May 2009 | York Hall, London, England | |
| 20 | Loss | 12–8 | Lee Swaby | PTS | 10 | 9 May 2009 | Lincolnshire Showground, Lincoln, England | For vacant Midlands Area heavyweight title |
| 19 | Loss | 12–7 | Paolo Vidoz | KO | 2 (6) | 16 May 2008 | PalaRuffini, Turin, Italy | |
| 18 | Loss | 12–6 | David Dolan | UD | 3 | 11 Apr 2008 | York Hall, London, England | Prizefighter: The Heavyweights - Semi final |
| 17 | Win | 12–5 | Colin Kenna | TKO | 2 (3), 2:45 | 11 Apr 2008 | York Hall, London, England | Prizefighter: The Heavyweights - Quarter final |
| 16 | Loss | 11–5 | Sebastian Köber | UD | 6 | 29 Feb 2008 | Sporthalle, Hamburg, Germany | |
| 15 | Loss | 11–4 | Derek Chisora | PTS | 4 | 12 Jan 2008 | York Hall, London, England | |
| 14 | Win | 11–3 | Luke Simpkin | PTS | 4 | 3 Mar 2007 | Meadowside Leisure Centre, Burton, England | |
| 13 | Loss | 10–3 | Chris Burton | TKO | 4 (4), 0:49 | 5 Dec 2006 | Civic Hall, Wolverhampton, England | |
| 12 | Win | 10–2 | David Ingleby | PTS | 6 | 18 Mar 2006 | Leofric Hotel, Coventry, England | |
| 11 | Win | 9–2 | Jason Callum | PTS | 4 | 22 Oct 2005 | Mercia Park Leisure Centre, Coventry, England | |
| 10 | Win | 8–2 | Mal Rice | PTS | 4 | 25 June 2005 | Cattle Market, Melton Mowbray, England | |
| 9 | Loss | 7–2 | David Ingleby | PTS | 6 | 30 Apr 2005 | Leofric Hotel, Coventry, England | |
| 8 | Win | 7–1 | David Ingleny | KO | 5 (6), 0:50 | 6 Dec 2004 | Ramada Jarvis Hotel, Leicester, England | |
| 7 | Win | 6–1 | Lee Mountford | PTS | 6 | 26 Sep 2004 | King's Hall, Stoke, England | |
| 6 | Win | 5–1 | Ebrima Secka | PTS | 6 | 27 Apr 2004 | Elland Road, Leeds, England | |
| 5 | Loss | 4–1 | Paul Buttery | TKO | 3 (4), 0:55 | 19 Apr 2003 | Everton Park Sports Centre, Liverpool, England | |
| 4 | Win | 4–0 | Dave Clarke | PTS | 6 | 8 Mar 2003 | AT7 Centre, Coventry, England | |
| 3 | Win | 3–0 | Alvin Miller | PTS | 6 | 9 Dec 2002 | Holiday Inn, Nottingham, England | |
| 2 | Win | 2–0 | Gary Williams | TKO | 1 (6), 2:49 | 16 Nov 2002 | Leofric Hotel, Coventry, England | |
| 1 | Win | 1–0 | Dave Clarke | PTS | 4 | 5 Oct 2002 | AT7 Centre, Coventry, England | |

Sporting positions
Regional boxing titles
| Vacant Title last held by Lee Swaby | Midlands Area heavyweight champion 17 May 2014 – ? Vacated | Vacant |
