= Yaroslav Zavorotnyi =

Ukrainian boxer (born 1975)

Personal information
- Nickname: Ardent
- Born: 16 January 1975 (age 51) Kharkiv, Ukraine
- Height: 6 ft 4 in (193 cm)
- Weight: Heavyweight

Boxing career
- Reach: 75 in (191 cm)
- Stance: Orthodox

Boxing record
- Total fights: 23
- Wins: 16
- Win by KO: 14
- Losses: 7

Yaroslav Zavorotnyi (born 16 January 1975) is a Ukrainian former professional boxer who competed from 2001 to 2014. At regional level, he challenged once for the European heavyweight title in 2010.

== Professional career ==
Zavorotnyi faced undefeated Nikolai Valuev (27–0, 22 KOs) at the Druzhba Arena in Donetsk on 15 June 2002, losing by technical knockout in the third round.

On 22 July 2010, it was announced that Zavorotnyi would fight Alexander Dimitrenko (29–1, 19 KOs) for the vacant European heavyweight title at the O2 World, in Hamburg on 31 July. Zavorotnyi lost by TKO in the fifth round.

Zavorotnyi faced undefeated Kubrat Pulev (10–0, 5 KOs) at the MCH Arena in Herning on 12 February 2011, losing by unanimous decision.

On 7 May 2014, it was announced that Zavorotnyi would fight David Price (17–2, 15 KOs) at the Sport- und Kongresshalle in Schwerin on 7 June 2014. Price weighed 252.4 pounds and Zavorotnyi weighed 246.5 pounds. Zavorotnyi lost by UD.

On 13 July 2014, it was announced that Zavorotnyi would fight Olympic gold medallist Anthony Joshua on August 30 in Dublin. Although the bout was postponed, it was ultimately cancelled.

== Professional boxing record ==
23 fights	16 wins	7 losses
By knockout	14	2
By decision	2	5

No.	Result	Record	Opponent	Type	Round, time	Date	Location	Notes
23	Loss	16–7	David Price	UD	10	7 Jun 2014	Sport- und Kongresshalle, Schwerin, Germany	
22	Win	16–6	Sedrak Agagulyan	TKO	4 (6), 0:32	19 Sep 2013	Giant Hall Casino Conti, Saint Petersburg, Russia	
21	Win	15–6	Vadzim Zmitrovich	TKO	2 (8)	20 Sep 2011	Olympic Sport Complex, Minsk, Belarus	
20	Loss	14–6	Kubrat Pulev	UD	8	12 Feb 2011	MCH Arena, Herning, Denmark	
19	Loss	14–5	Alexander Dimitrenko	TKO	5 (12), 1:25	31 Jul 2010	O2 World, Hamburg, Germany	For vacant European heavyweight title
18	Win	14–4	Maxim Maslov	KO	6 (12)	20 Mar 2010	Sport Hall Energia, Narva, Estonia	Won External heavyweight title
17	Win	13–4	Josef Kuricaj	KO	1 (4)	15 Nov 2009	EKZ Arena, Berlin, Germany	
16	Loss	12–4	Richel Hersisia	UD	8	26 Oct 2009	Royal Theater Carré, Amsterdam, Netherlands	
15	Win	12–3	Dmitrijs Basovs	TKO	2 (4)	2 Oct 2009	MOSiR Sports Hall, Chelm, Poland	
14	Win	11–3	Raman Sukhaterin	UD	6	25 Jun 2009	Giant Hall Casino Conti, Saint Petersburg, Russia	
13	Loss	10–3	Rene Dettweiler	UD	8	28 Feb 2009	Jahnsportforum, Neubrandenburg, Germany	
12	Win	10–2	Chris Puechner	TKO	2 (4)	21 Dec 2008	Universal Hall, Berlin, Germany	
11	Win	9–2	Don Diego Poeder	TKO	1 (6)	8 Oct 2007	Royal Theater Carré, Amsterdam, Netherlands	
10	Loss	8–2	Gbenga Oluokun	MD	6	19 Sep 2006	Kugelbake-Halle, Cuxhaven, Germany	
9	Win	8–1	Piotr Sapun	TKO	2 (6)	16 Mar 2005	Lokomotyv Sports Palace, Kharkiv, Ukraine	
8	Win	7–1	Oleg Rogatin	KO	1 (6)	20 Jan 2005	Sportpalace, Kharkiv, Ukraine	
7	Win	6–1	Aleh Tsukanau	TKO	3 (6)	24 Sep 2004	Sportpalace, Odesa, Ukraine	
6	Win	5–1	Uladzislau Hantar	UD	4	14 Aug 2004	Mebelny-3, Minsk, Belarus	
5	Win	4–1	Volodymyr Kurtsev	KO	5 (6)	26 Sep 2003	Pervomaysk, Ukraine	
4	Win	3–1	Vadym Kolpakov	KO	3 (4)	29 Nov 2002	Pervomaysk, Ukraine	
3	Loss	2–1	Nikolai Valuev	TKO	3 (10)	15 Jun 2002	Druzhba Arena, Donetsk Ukraine	
2	Win	2–0	Valentyn Pelechko	KO	6 (6)	18 Sep 2001	Kharkiv, Ukraine	
1	Win	1–0	Igor Momot	KO	3 (4)	9 May 2001	Pervomaysk, Ukraine	

== Kickboxing record ==
Kickboxing record
2 Wins (2 (T)KOs), 3 Losses
Date	Result	Opponent	Event	Location	Method	Round	Time
2004-07-28	Loss	(Latvia) Konstantin Gluhov	BARS: Glukhov vs. Zavorotny	Moscow, Russia	Decision (Unanimous)	5	3:00
2002-05-04	Loss	(Belarus) Alexander Ustinov	K-1: Ukraine 2002	Kyiv, Ukraine	Decision (Unanimous)	3	3:00
2001-06-24	Loss	(Belarus) Sergei Ivanovich	K-1: Ukraine 2001	Lugansk, Ukraine	Decision (Unanimous)	3	3:00
2001-06-24	Win	(Ukraine) Sergei Morozov	K-1: Ukraine 2001	Lugansk, Ukraine	KO	4	2:20
2001-06-24	Win	(Georgia (country)) Temur Mukhiashvili	K-1: Ukraine 2001	Lugansk, Ukraine	KO	3	1:02
Legend: Win Loss Draw/No contest Notes

Sporting positions
Regional boxing titles
Preceded by Maxim Maslov	External heavyweight champion 20 March 2010 – October 2014; Vacated	Vacant Title next held by Arnold Gjergjaj
