= Rene Dettweiler =

German boxer (born 1983)

Personal information
- Nickname: Negation
- Born: 25 April 1983 (age 43) Lübz, East Germany
- Height: 6 ft 4 in (193 cm)
- Weight: Heavyweight

Boxing career
- Stance: Southpaw

Boxing record
- Total fights: 28
- Wins: 25
- Win by KO: 12
- Losses: 3
Medal record
Men's amateur boxing
Representing Germany
Brandenburg Cup
Bronze medal – third place	2001 Frankfurt	Super-heavyweight
German National Championships
Bronze medal – third place	2002 Sindelfingen	Heavyweight

Rene Dettweiler (born 25 April 1983) is a German former professional boxer who competed from 2003 to 2010.

== Amateur career ==
Dettweiler competed in an international dual match between Germany and Poland, losing on points to Patryk Bartkiewiczs. Later that year, Dettweiler competed in the 2001 Brandenburg Cup, losing on points to eventual silver medalist, Mario Preskar, in the semifinals. Dettweiler competed in the 2001 European Junior Championships, losing via stoppage to eventual bronze medalist, Valeriy Duryagin, in the quarterfinals.

Dettweiler competed in the 2002 German National Championships, losing on points, in the semifinal.

== Professional career ==
Dettweiler compiled a perfect 16–0 record before, on 22 April 2006, facing undefeated heavyweight Ondřej Pála on the undercard of Chris Byrd against Wladimir Klitschko in Mannheim, Germany. Dettweiler won a unanimous points decision on the judges' scorecards.

Dettweiler challenged Michael Sprott on 4 November 2006, for the European Union heavyweight title, losing by split decision.

On 30 August 2008, Dettweiler faced Cengiz Koc on the undercard of Nikolai Valuev against John Ruiz in Berlin, Germany, losing by majority decision.

On 30 January 2010, Dettweiler faced undefeated heavyweight Edmund Gerber, losing by technical knockout in the second round.

== Professional boxing record ==
28 fights	25 wins	3 losses
By knockout	12	1
By decision	12	2
By disqualification	1	0

No.	Result	Record	Opponent	Type	Round, time	Date	Location	Notes
28	Loss	25–3	Edmund Gerber	TKO	2 (8), 0:47	30 Jan 2010	Jahnsportforum, Neubrandenburg, Germany	
27	Win	25–2	Gbenga Oluokun	UD	8	17 Oct 2009	O2 World, Berlin, Germany	
26	Win	24–2	Yaroslav Zavorotnyi	UD	8	28 Feb 2009	Jahnsportforum, Neubrandenburg, Germany	
25	Win	23–2	Viktor Szalai	KO	1 (8), 0:43	10 Oct 2008	EKZ "Helle Mitte", Berlin, Germany	
24	Loss	22–2	Cengiz Koc	MD	8	30 Aug 2008	Max-Schmeling-Halle, Berlin, Germany	
23	Win	22–1	Daniil Peretyatko	UD	8	12 Apr 2008	Jahnsportforum, Neubrandenburg, Germany	
22	Win	21–1	Valeri Semiskur	TKO	1 (8), 2:24	23 Jun 2007	Stadthalle, Zwickau, Germany	
21	Win	20–1	Ivica Perkovic	DQ	8 (8), 1:38	14 Apr 2007	Porsche-Arena, Stuttgart, Germany	Perkovic disqualified for stalling
20	Win	19–1	Tipton Walker	TKO	4 (8), 0:47	3 Mar 2007	StadtHalle, Rostock, Germany	
19	Loss	18–1	Michael Sprott	SD	12	4 Nov 2006	RWE Rhein-Ruhr Sporthalle, Mülheim, Germany	For European Union heavyweight title
18	Win	18–0	David Vicena	TKO	8 (8)	20 May 2006	Piazza di Siena, Rome, Italy	
17	Win	17–0	Ondřej Pála	UD	8	22 Apr 2006	SAP Arena, Mannheim, Germany	
16	Win	16–0	Gene Pukall	KO	1 (8), 1:57	28 Jan 2006	Tempodrom, Berlin, Germany	
15	Win	15–0	Ante Lovric	TKO	1 (6), 0:57	17 Dec 2005	Max-Schmeling-Halle, Berlin, Germany	
14	Win	14–0	Raman Sukhaterin	UD	6	12 Nov 2005	Alsterdorfer Sporthalle, Hamburg, Germany	
13	Win	13–0	Ralf Packheiser	UD	6	3 Sep 2005	Internationales Congress Centrum, Berlin, Germany	
12	Win	12–0	Imrich Borka	TKO	3 (6)	2 Jul 2005	Karl-Eckel-Weg Halle, Hattersheim am Main, Germany	
11	Win	11–0	Robert Kooser	TKO	3 (6)	11 Jun 2005	BigBox, Kempten, Germany	
10	Win	10–0	Aleksandrs Borhovs	TKO	4 (6)	23 Apr 2005	Westfalenhallen, Dortmund, Germany	
9	Win	9–0	Tomas Mrazek	UD	6	20 Nov 2004	BigBox, Kempten, Germany	
8	Win	8–0	Muhammed Ali Durmaz	UD	6	16 Oct 2004	Maritim Hotel Köln, Cologne, Germany	
7	Win	7–0	Aleksandrs Borhovs	PTS	4	24 Jul 2004	Brandenburg Halle, Frankfurt, Germany	
6	Win	6–0	Marek Oravsky	KO	2 (4)	5 Jun 2004	Chemnitz Arena, Chemnitz, Germany	
5	Win	5–0	Ervin Slonka	PTS	4	28 Feb 2004	Mehrzweckhalle, Dresden, Germany	
4	Win	4–0	Vladislav Druso	UD	4	22 Nov 2003	Erdgas Arena, Riesa, Germany	
3	Win	3–0	Frantisek Vasak	TKO	3 (4)	4 Oct 2003	Stadthalle, Zwickau, Germany	
2	Win	2–0	Frank Dunklau	UD	4	16 Aug 2003	Nürburgring, Nürburg, Germany	
1	Win	1–0	Frank Boehme	KO	2 (4)	31 May 2003	Brandenburg Halle, Frankfurt, Germany	
