= Paolo Vidoz =

Italian boxer (born 1970)

Personal information
- Nickname: Titanium Jaw
- Born: 21 August 1970 (age 56) Gorizia, Italy
- Weight: Heavyweight

Boxing career
- Stance: Orthodox

Boxing record
- Total fights: 39
- Wins: 28
- Win by KO: 15
- Losses: 11
Medal record
Representing Italy
Men's amateur boxing
Olympic Games
Bronze medal – third place	2000 Sydney	Super-heavyweight
World Championships
Bronze medal – third place	1997 Budapest	Super-heavyweight
Bronze medal – third place	1999 Houston	Super-heavyweight
European Championships
Silver medal – second place	2000 Tampere	Super-heavyweight
Mediterranean Games
Bronze medal – third place	1993 Languedoc-Roussillon	Super Heavyweight
Gold medal – first place	1997 Bari	Super Heavyweight
Goodwill Games
Gold medal – first place	1998 New York	Super Heavyweight

Paolo Vidoz (born 21 August 1970) is an Italian former professional boxer who competed from 2001 to 2011. At regional level, he held the European heavyweight title from 2005 to 2006. As an amateur, he won a bronze medal at the 2000 Olympics, bronze at the 1997 and 1999 World Championships, and silver at the 2000 European Championships.

== Amateur career ==
He won Olympic Bronze in 2000 at Super Heavyweight after beating Calvin Brock and Samuel Peter but lost to Audley Harrison.

=== Amateur highlights ===
- Italian Superheavyweight Champion 1991, 1993, 1995–1997, 1999
- 1996 competed at the European Championships in Vejle, Denmrl. Results were:
  - Defeated Vasile Ciocan (Romania) RSC-2
  - Defeated Miroslav Gavenciak (Slovakia) PTS
  - Lost to René Monse (Germany) DSQ-3
- 1996 competed as a Superheavyweight at the Atlanta Olympics. Results was:
  - Lost to Alexis Rubalcaba (Cuba) RSCH-1
- 1997 3rd place at the World Championships in Budapest, Hungary. Results were:
  - Defeated Patrick Halberg (Denmark) PTS
  - Defeated Henryk Zatyka (Poland) PTS
  - Defeated Ahmed El Akad (Egypt) PTS
  - Lost to Alexis Rubalcaba (Cuba) PTS
- 1997 won the Mediterranean Games in Bari, Italy beating Sinan Samil Sam of Turkey in the final.
- 1998 won the Goodwill Games in New York, USA. Results were:
  - Defeated Keith Govan (USA) PTS (8-1)
  - Defeated Dmitriy Diagilev (Russia) PTS (8-2)
  - Defeated Alexis Rubalcaba (Cuba) PTS (9-3)
- 1998 competed at the European Championships in Minsk, Belarus. Results were:
  - Defeated Rimantas Priczmantas (Lithuania) PTS
  - Lost to Vladimir Lazebnik (Ukraine) PTS
- 1999 3rd place at the World Championships in Houston, USA. Results were:
  - Defeated Patrice L'Heureux (Canada) PTS
  - Defeated Alexis Rubalcaba (Cuba) PTS (2-5)
  - Lost to Mukhtarkhan Dildabekov (Kazakhstan) PTS
- 2000 2nd place at the European Championships in Tampere, Finland. Results were:
  - Defeated Kurban Guenerbakan (Turkey) RSCI-1
  - Defeated Kestutis Bitkevicius (Lithuania) RSC-4
  - Defeated Bagrat Oghanian (Armenia) PTS
  - Lost to Alexei Lezin (Russia) PTS
- 2000 won Super Heavyweight bronze at the Sydney Olympics. Results were:
  - Defeated Calvin Brock (USA) RSCO-4
  - Defeated Samuel Peter (Nigeria) PTS (14-3)
  - Lost to Audley Harrison (Great Britain) PTS (16-32)

== Professional career ==
His first match was held at Madison Square Garden on 27 January 2001, against Chris Morris. He won the match via knockout at 2 minutes and 22 seconds in the first round.

Vidoz kept up a solid winning streak before encountering Zuri Lawrence, a "journeyman" fighter who, while proficient in his defensive ability, lacks a modicum of talent with regard to hitting his opponents (he has failed to record even a single knockout throughout his 12 years in the ring). Lawrence was able to baffle Vidoz with his slippery movement in the ring and score a unanimous decision after eight rounds.

Vidoz bounced back with his next fight, registering a devastating knockout of Eduardo Sandivares at just under a minute into the fight.

Vidoz dropped out of serious contention with a ninth-round TKO loss to Russian boxer Nicolay Valuev on 9 October 2004 at the Messehalle in Erfurt, Germany.

On 6 June 2005, Vidoz captured vacant European (EBU) heavyweight title and IBF Inter-Continental title with a split decision over Timo Hoffmann. Vidoz followed this up with a victory over British fighter Michael Sprott, but his "Titanium Jaw" was later checked in a fight in July 2006 against Vladimir Virchis, who beat Vidoz by KO in the sixth.

After his loss to Virchis he rebounded with two more wins against Alexei Osokin and Antoine Palatis before losing to Virchis one more time this time by unanimous decision.

He won two more fights against Zoltan Peto and Paul Butlin, winning both of them by knockout.

He faced Sinan Samil Sam for the vacant EBU (European) heavyweight title on 4 July 2008, but lost by majority decision. This fight was particularly strange, with the Manager of Samil screaming and bullying the judges at the end of the fight, to obtain a winning decision over Vidoz. He fought Matt Skelton for the vacant EBU European heavyweight title on 19 December 2008. He lost the fight after refusing to come out for round 10. In his most recent fight he defeated Tomasz Zeprzalka by TKO in the fourth round. On 18 December 2009, he fought Albert Sosnowski for the EBU heavyweight title but lost by unanimous decision after twelve rounds.

After his loss to Sosnowski he would go on to lose his next three fights to Claus Bertino, Alexander Ustinov and Kubrat Pulev. All of those losses came by decision.

He would go on to win his next two fights by decision against Gabor Farkas and Sandor Balogh. His most recent fight was on December 16, 2011, where he lost a decision to undefeated Matteo Modugno and has retired after deciding to hang up the gloves following the loss.

== Professional boxing record ==
39 fights	28 wins	11 losses
By knockout	15	3
By decision	13	8

No.	Result	Record	Opponent	Type	Round, time	Date	Location	Notes
39	Loss	28–11	Matteo Modugno	UD	10	16 Dec 2011	Palazzetto dello Sport, Rezzato, Italy	For Italian heavyweight title
38	Win	28–10	Sandor Balogh	PTS	6	9 Sep 2011	Manzano, Italy	
37	Win	27–10	Gabor Farkas	PTS	6	15 Jul 2011	Monfalcone, Italy	
36	Loss	26–10	Kubrat Pulev	UD	8	18 Dec 2010	Max-Schmeling-Halle, Berlin, Germany	
35	Loss	26–9	Alexander Ustinov	UD	12	26 Jun 2010	Sports Palace, Odesa, Ukraine	For EBA heavyweight title
34	Loss	26–8	Claus Bertino	MD	8	30 Jan 2010	NRGi Arena, Aarhus, Denmark	
33	Loss	26–7	Albert Sosnowski	UD	12	18 Dec 2009	York Hall, London, England	For vacant European heavyweight title
32	Win	26–6	Tomasz Zeprzalka	TKO	4 (6)	7 Mar 2009	Palazzetto dello Sport, Gorizia, Italy	
31	Loss	25–6	Matt Skelton	RTD	9 (12), 3:00	19 Dec 2008	PalaLido, Milan, Italy	For vacant European heavyweight title
30	Loss	25–5	Sinan Şamil Sam	MD	12	4 Jul 2008	Bueyuek Anadolu Hotel, Ankara, Turkey	For vacant European heavyweight title
29	Win	25–4	Paul Butlin	KO	2 (6)	16 May 2008	PalaRuffini, Turin, Italy	
28	Win	24–4	Zoltan Peto	TKO	1 (6)	21 Dec 2007	PalaBam, Mantua, Italy	
27	Loss	23–4	Volodymyr Virchis	UD	12	19 May 2007	Color Line Arena, Hamburg, Germany	For European heavyweight title
26	Win	23–3	Antoine Palatis	UD	8	27 Jan 2007	Palazzetto dello Sport, Cividale del Friuli, Italy	
25	Win	22–3	Alexey Osokin	UD	8	11 Nov 2006	Camisano Vicentino, Veneto, Italy	
24	Loss	21–3	Volodymyr Virchis	KO	6 (12), 2:17	15 Jul 2006	Color Line Arena, Hamburg, Germany	Lost European heavyweight title
23	Win	21–2	Cengiz Koç	UD	12	28 Jan 2006	Tempodrom, Berlin, Germany	Retained European heavyweight title
22	Win	20–2	Michael Sprott	UD	12	1 Oct 2005	EWE Arena, Oldenburg, Germany	Retained European heavyweight title
21	Win	19–2	Timo Hoffmann	SD	12	11 Jun 2005	BigBox, Berlin, Germany	Won IBF Intercontinental and vacant European heavyweight titles
20	Win	18–2	Mindaugas Kulikauskas	TKO	3 (6)	16 Apr 2005	Palazzetto dello Sport, Bergamo, Italy	
19	Loss	17–2	Nikolai Valuev	TKO	9 (12), 2:33	9 Oct 2004	Messehalle, Erfurt, Germany	For vacant WBA Intercontinental heavyweight title
18	Win	17–1	Tamer Mourad	KO	2 (6)	6 Aug 2004	Palermo, Sicily, Italy	
17	Win	16–1	Thierry Guezouli	KO	3 (6)	12 Mar 2004	Camisano Vicentino, Veneto, Italy	
16	Win	15–1	Siarhei Dychkou	PTS	8	6 Feb 2004	Ariano nel Polesine, Veneto, Italy	
15	Win	14–1	Ralf Packheiser	TKO	4 (6)	17 Dec 2003	Palasport, Bergamo, Italy	
14	Win	13–1	Antoine Palatis	PTS	6	7 Jun 2003	Casinò di Campione, Trieste, Italy	
13	Win	12–1	Eduardo Andres Sandivares	KO	1 (6), 0:58	15 Apr 2003	Palazzetto dello Sport, Piacenza, Italy	
12	Loss	11–1	Zuri Lawrence	UD	8	17 Aug 2002	Trump Taj Majal, Atlantic City, New Jersey, U.S.	
11	Win	11–0	Joe Lenhart	UD	6	26 Jul 2002	Mountaineer Casino, Racetrack and Resort, Chester, West Virginia, U.S.	
10	Win	10–0	Alessandro Guni	TKO	5 (10)	19 Apr 2002	Udine, Italy	Won vacant Italian heavyweight title
9	Win	9–0	Craig Tomlinson	TKO	3 (8), 2:29	9 Mar 2002	AJ Palumbo Center, Pittsburgh, Pennsylvania, U.S.	
8	Win	8–0	Marco Heinichen	KO	2 (6)	9 Feb 2002	Civitavecchia, Italy	
7	Win	7–0	Nicholus Nurse	UD	6	9 Nov 2001	San Antonio Station, San Antonio, Texas, U.S.	
6	Win	6–0	Ronnie Copeland	TKO	4 (6), 0:37	28 Sep 2001	Caesars Palace, Paradise, Nevada, U.S.	
5	Win	5–0	Chris Hairston	TKO	2 (6)	7 Jul 2001	KeySpan Park, Brooklyn, New York, U.S.	
4	Win	4–0	Eduardo Antonio Carranza	UD	4	26 May 2001	Trieste, Italy	
3	Win	3–0	Bobby McGraw	TKO	1 (4), 2:36	20 Apr 2001	Cintas Center, Cincinnati, Ohio, U.S.	
2	Win	2–0	Marcus Johnson	UD	4	24 Mar 2001	MGM Grand Garden Arena, Paradise, Nevada, U.S.	
1	Win	1–0	Chris Morris	KO	1 (4), 2:22	27 Jan 2001	Madison Square Garden, New York City, New York, U.S.	

== See also ==
- Nino Benvenuti
- Fabio Tuiach
- Duilio Loi
- Tiberio Mitri
