= GETEC Arena =

Indoor sporting arena in Magdeburg, Germany

Coordinates: 52°07′42″N 11°39′59″E

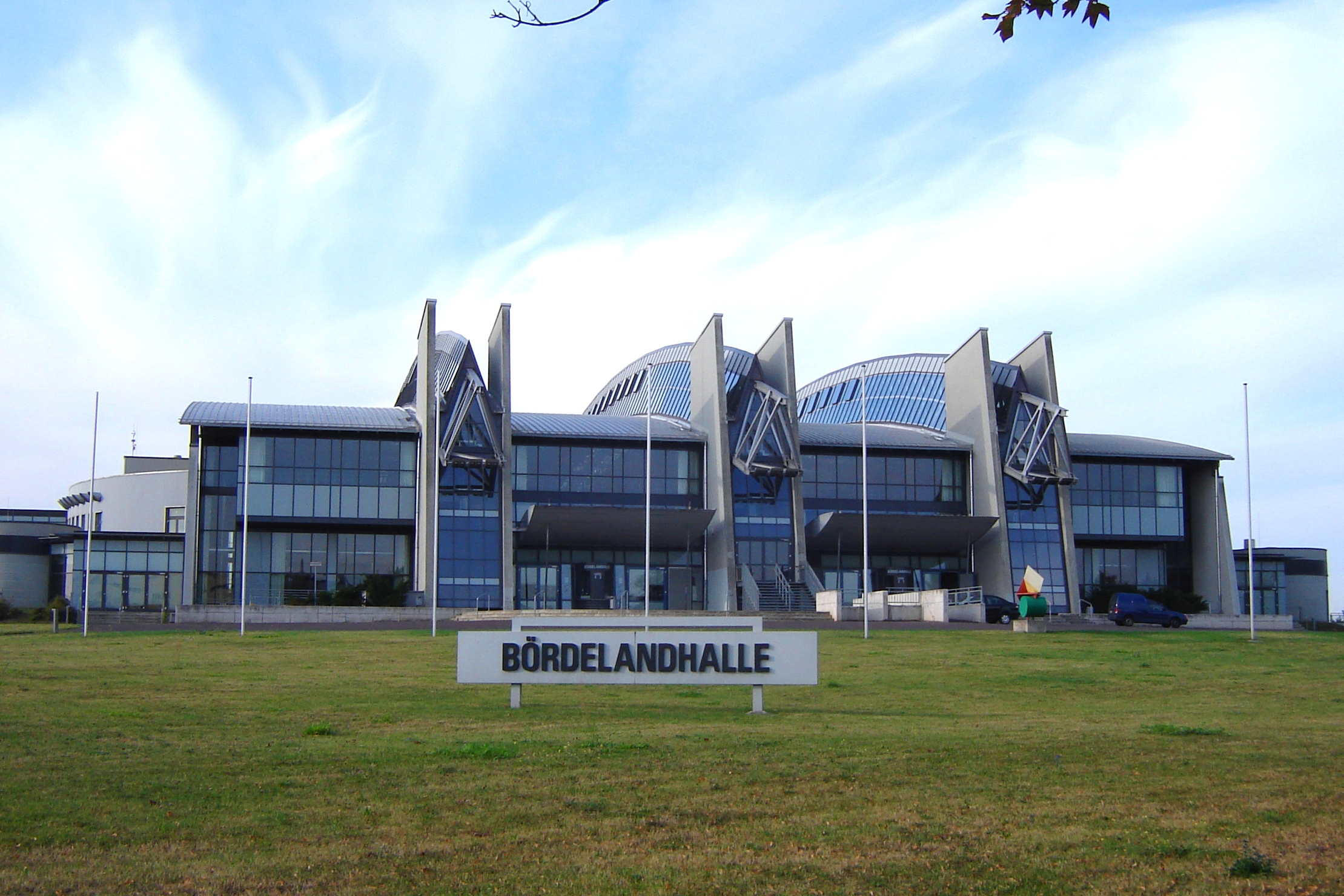
Bördelandhalle in Magdeburg, Saxony-Anhalt

The GETEC Arena (until 2011: "Bördelandhalle") is an indoor sporting arena located in Magdeburg, Germany. The maximum capacity of the arena is 8,071 people for handball games and 8,820 for boxing matches. It is the current home to SC Magdeburg's Handball-Bundesliga team.

== See also ==
- List of indoor arenas in Germany
