= Callum Smith vs. Erik Skoglund =

Boxing match

- Date: 16 September 2017
- Venue: Echo Arena, Liverpool, United Kingdom

Tale of the tape
Boxer	(United Kingdom) Callum Smith	(Sweden) Erik Skoglund
Nickname	"Mundo"	"Swedish Sensation"
Hometown	Liverpool, Merseyside, UK	Vårdinge, Södertälje, Sweden
Pre-fight record	22–0 (17 KO)	26–0 (12 KO)
Age	27 years, 4 months	26 years, 3 months
Height	6 ft 3 in (191 cm)	6 ft 1 in (185 cm)
Weight	167 3/5 lb (76 kg)	167 7/10 lb (76 kg)
Style	Orthodox	Orthodox
Recognition	WBC; No. 1 Ranked Super Middleweight; The Ring; No. 4 Ranked Super Middleweight; TBRB; No. 7 Ranked Super Middleweight; WBC Silver super middleweight champion	IBF; No. 3 Ranked Light Heavyweight; WBC; No. 12 Ranked Super Middleweight

Result
- Smith defeated Skoglund via Unanimous Decision (116–112, 117–110, 117–111)

Callum Smith vs. Erik Skoglund was a professional boxing match contested on 16 September 2017.

== Background ==
After WBC champion Badou Jack moved up to light-heavyweight, number one contender Callum Smith and number two ranked Anthony Dirrell were ordered to face each for the vacant belt. However after disagreements over the location and Dirrell's refusal to enter the upcoming World Boxing Super Series, so the fight could take place in the quarter-finals, the fight was cancelled and the WBC allowed Dirrell and David Benavidez to the fight for the vacant title.

At the WBSS draft Gala, held at the Grimaldi Forum in Monaco, Smith, who was second-seeded, chose to fight the unbeaten Swedish contender Erik Skoglund, who had been fighting light-heavyweight. Smith explained why he chose Skoglund, saying he felt Skoglund was 'stylistically the best fight' for him. On 19 July, Smith confirmed the fight would take place at the Echo Arena in Liverpool on 16 September 2017. It would also be the first fight of the series. Smith also admitted, on paper, Skoglund is the best boxer he would fight. Skoglund, who had previously fought in Sweden, Finland, Denmark and Germany, said he had no issues with traveling to England, as he was looking to prove himself.

== The fight ==
Skoglund came out fighting and blooded Smith's nose in the fifth round. Smith would take control in the latter rounds, dropping the swede in the 11th round after a barrage of big shots. The fight would go the full 12 rounds and Smith won a clear unanimous decision with scores of 116–112, 117–110 & 117–111.

== Aftermath ==
Smith moved in the WBSS semi final to face the winner of the Jürgen Brähmer vs. Robert Brant bout on 27 October 2017.

The next quarter final was held three weeks later between Chris Eubank Jr and Avni Yildirim.

Skoglund was set to face Rocky Fielding on the undercard of Tony Bellew vs. David Haye II but an injury to Haye got the bout be pushed back. On 8 December 2017, he suffered a brain hemorrhage during a sparring session in his hometown, Nyköping. He was put into a medically induced coma and had surgery. Skoglund was awakened from the coma in January 2018 and was seen responsive and walking with the help of a crutch.

== Undercard ==
Confirmed bouts:

Winner	Loser	Weight division/title belt(s) disputed	Result
(United Kingdom) Martin Murray	(Germany) Arman Torosyan	Super middleweight (8 rounds)	4th round TKO
(United Kingdom) Zach Parker	(United Kingdom) Luke Blackledge	British super middleweight title eliminator (10 rounds)	1st round TKO
Preliminary bouts
(United Kingdom) Adam Little	(United Kingdom) Reece MacMillan	Light welterweight (6 rounds)	4th round TKO
(United Kingdom) Isaac Macleod	(United Kingdom) Danny Craven	Welterweight (6 rounds)	Points decision
(United Kingdom) Luke Willis	(Nicaragua) Reynaldo Mora	Welterweight (6 rounds)	Points decision
(United Kingdom) Joe Wood	(Bulgaria) Iliyan Markov	Light middleweight (4 rounds)	3rd round TKO
(United Kingdom) Lloyd Campbell	(Czech Republic) Michal Vosyka	Light middleweight (4 rounds)	2nd round TKO
(United Kingdom) Mikael Lawal	(Poland) Jakub Wojcik	Cruiserweight (4 rounds)	Points decision
(United Kingdom) Brian Phillips	(Poland) Kamil Jaworek	Featherweight (4 rounds)	2nd round TKO
(United Kingdom) John Gillies	(Hungary) Ferenc Zsalek	Heavyweight (4 rounds)	Points decision

== Broadcasting ==
Country	Broadcaster
Baltic & Nordic countries	Viasat
Belgium	VOO
Bulgaria	Nova
Canada	Super Channel
Germany	SAT.1
Russia	Match! Boets
Singapore	StarHub
Sub-Saharan Africa	TVMS
Turkey	Tivibu Sports
United Kingdom	ITV
Ukraine	Inter

Preceded by vs. Luke Blackledge	Callum Smith's bouts 16 September 2017	Succeeded by vs. Nieky Holzken
Preceded by vs. Shpetim Shala	Erik Skoglund's bouts 16 September 2017	Retired
