= George Groves vs. Jamie Cox =

Boxing match

- Date: 14 October 2017
- Venue: Wembley Arena, Brent, London
- Title(s) on the line: WBA (Super) super middleweight title

Tale of the tape
Boxer	(United Kingdom) George Groves	(United Kingdom) Jamie Cox
Nickname	"Saint George"	
Hometown	Hammersmith, London	Swindon, Wiltshire
Pre-fight record	26–3 (19 KO)	24–0 (13 KO)
Age	29 years, 6 months	31 years, 1 month
Height	5 ft 11 1/2 in (182 cm)	5 ft 11 in (180 cm)
Weight	167 1/10 lb (76 kg)	167 4/5 lb (76 kg)
Style	Orthodox	Southpaw
Recognition	WBA; Super Middleweight Champion; The Ring/TBRB; No. 3 Ranked Super Middleweight	WBA; No. 9 Ranked Super Middleweight

Result
- Groves defeats Cox in the 4th round via KO.

George Groves vs. Jamie Cox was a professional boxing match contested on 14 October 2017, for the WBA super middleweight championship.

== Background ==
Having successfully won a world title at the fourth time of asking against Fedor Chudinov, George Groves entered into the World Boxing Super Series as the number one seed and second favourite to win the tournament behind undefeated contenter Callum Smith.

At the WBSS draft Gala, held at the Grimaldi Forum in Monaco on 8 July 2017, Groves choose to fight undefeated follow Brit Jamie Cox. Groves claimed that picking Cox was a '"strategic" move and due to the tournament being long, it would be best to "pick the easy guy first". The fight would take place on 14 October at Wembley Arena London with the winner advancing to the semi-finals to face the winner of the second quarter final between Chris Eubank Jr. vs. Avni Yildirim held the week before. Groves would take back his earlier words of saying Cox was the easiest, "I know there are no easy fights in this tournament and there are no easy fights at world level, but Jamie is the guy I know the most about." Speaking at the weigh in Groves claimed he would "not give up his world title for anything".

On the undercard tournament reserve Patrick Nielsen was upset by John Ryder, who knocked him out in the fifth round.

== The fight ==
The fight started with both boxers feeling each other out and trading sporadically. Cox would box well if somewhat recklessly for the first two rounds while Groves patiently waited to land counter punches.

Halfway through the fourth round Cox missed with a left hook leaving him open for a perfectly placed counter right hand to the body from Groves that sent Cox down in pain. He failed to beat the count of referee Steve Gray giving Groves a knockout victory. Groves landed 48 of 163 punches thrown (29%) while Cox landed 36 of 131 thrown (28%).

== Aftermath ==
Chris Eubank Jr., who was sat ringside following his victory over Avni Yildirim, entered the ring, giving his thoughts on the fight, "It was a good fight, he did what he had to win, not too many cuts and bruises so it looks like we're on for January. That's what we wanted." Groves spoke about his fallen opponent, "I picked him because I believe he was the most dangerous of the unseeded fighters. I didn't want an easy fight."

The final quarter final was held two weeks later between Jürgen Brähmer and Rob Brant.

== Undercard ==
Confirmed bouts:

== Broadcasting ==
Country	Broadcaster
Baltic & Nordic countries	Viasat
Belgium	VOO
Bulgaria	Nova
Canada	Super Channel
Germany	SAT.1
Russia	Match! Boets
Singapore	StarHub
Sub-Saharan Africa	TVMS
Turkey	Tivibu Sports
United Kingdom	ITV
United States	Audience
Ukraine	Inter

Preceded by vs. Fedor Chudinov	George Groves's bouts 14 October 2017	Succeeded by vs. Chris Eubank Jr.
Preceded by vs. Giorgi Kandelaki	Jamie Cox's bouts 14 October 2017	Succeeded by vs. Harry Matthews
