= Canelo Álvarez vs. Callum Smith =

2020 boxing match

- Date: 19 December 2020
- Venue: Alamodome, San Antonio, Texas
- Title(s) on the line: WBA (Super), The Ring and vacant WBC super middleweight titles

Tale of the tape
Boxer	Callum Smith	Saúl Álvarez
Nickname	Mundo	Canelo ("Cinnamon")
Hometown	Liverpool, Merseyside, UK	Guadalajara, Jalisco, Mexico
Pre-fight record	27–0 (19 KO)	53–1–2 (36 KO)
Age	30 years, 7 months	30 years, 5 months
Height	6 ft 3 in (191 cm)	5 ft 8 in (173 cm)
Weight	168 lb (76 kg)	168 lb (76 kg)
Style	Orthodox	Orthodox
Recognition	WBA (Super) and The Ring; Super Middleweight Champion; TBRB; No. 1 Ranked Super Middleweight	WBA, TBRB and The Ring; Middleweight Champion; TBRB; No. 4 Ranked Super Middleweight; The Ring No. 1 ranked pound-for-pound fighter 3-division world champion

Result
- Álvarez wins via 12-round unanimous decision (119-109, 119-109, 117-111)

Canelo Álvarez vs. Callum Smith was a professional boxing match contested on 19 December 2020, for the WBC, WBA and The Ring Super Middleweight championship.

== Background ==
Since defeating George Groves in the final of the World Boxing Super Series in September 2018, Callum Smith had made two successful defences and was seen as the best Super Middleweight in the division.

Canelo Álvarez had fought in three different weight divisions in his previous three bouts, having defeated Rocky Fielding at super middleweight, before returning to middleweight to unify against Daniel Jacobs (giving him 3 out of the 4 belts) and most recently in November 2019 when he moved up to Light Heavyweight to successfully challenge Sergey Kovalev for his WBO belt.

On 17 November Álvarez confirmed he would be challenging Smith on 19 December 2020, with the vacant WBC title also at stake. This came less than two weeks after Álvarez was released from his contract with Golden Boy Promotions after a lawsuit was settled for breach of contract.

The fight was to be held at the Alamodome in San Antonio, Texas.

Álvarez's trainer Eddy Reynoso revealed that his fighter had been sparring with undefeated heavyweight Frank Sánchez in preparation for the bout.

== The fight ==
On the night, Álvarez controlled the action over twelve rounds, making himself difficult to hit, jabbed smartly and whenever he could hitting Smith with his trademark shots to the body.

At the end 12 rounds Álvarez won by unanimous decision with scores of 119–109, 119–109, 117–111.

== Aftermath ==
Speaking afterwards Álvarez said "This is one of the best nights I have had".

Smith suffered a detached left bicep during the bout.

== Undercard ==
Confirmed bouts:

Winner	Loser	Weight division/title belt(s) disputed	Result
(Cuba) Frank Sánchez	(Mexico) Julian Fernandez	Heavyweight (10 rounds)	7th round TKO
(United States) Raymond Ford	(United States) Juan Antonio Lopez	Super featherweight (8 rounds)	7th round KO
(United States) Austin Williams	(United States) Isiah Jones	Middleweight (6 rounds)	1st round TKO
Preliminary bouts
(Mexico) Christian Gomez	(United States) Angel Hernandez	Light middleweight (8 rounds)	3rd round TKO
(Mexico) Alexis Eduardo Molina	(United States) Robert Greenwood	Super featherweight (4 rounds)	Majority draw
(United States) Marc Castro	(Mexico) Luis Valdes Pena	Super featherweight (4 rounds)	3rd round KO

Preceded by vs. Sergey Kovalev	Canelo Álvarez's bouts 19 December 2020	Succeeded by vs. Avni Yıldırım
Preceded by vs. John Ryder	Callum Smith's bouts 19 December 2020	Succeeded by vs. Lenin Castillo
