= Erik Skoglund (boxer) =

Swedish boxer

Personal information
- Nickname: Swedish Sensation
- Nationality: Swedish
- Born: Johan Erik Skoglund; 24 May 1991 (age 35) Vårdinge, Sweden
- Height: 1.86 m (6 ft 1 in)
- Weight: Super-middleweight; Light-heavyweight

Boxing career
- Stance: Orthodox

Boxing record
- Total fights: 27
- Wins: 26
- Win by KO: 12
- Losses: 1
Medal record
Men's amateur boxing
Representing Sweden
Strandzha Cup
| Bronze medal – third place | Plovdiv 2009 | Light heavyweight |
Swedish National Championships
| Silver medal – second place | 2007 Sundsvall | Welterweight |
| Silver medal – second place | 2008 Boden | Middleweight |
| Gold medal – first place | 2009 Lund | Light heavyweight |

Erik Skoglund (born 24 May 1991) is a Swedish professional boxer.

== Amateur career ==
Skoglund started his boxing career in 2002, at the age of 11. He won the Swedish youth national championship in 2006 and the junior championship in 2007, as well as taking the second place at senior level the same year 2007, at the age of 15. In 2008 he again finished in second place on the senior national championship, after losing the final to fellow rising star and future world champion Badou Jack. He also won the Nordic junior championship that year. In 2009 he won the national and Nordic championships at senior level.

He turned professional in 2010, after an amateur career with a record of 78-35-1.

== Professional boxing career ==
=== Light-heavyweight ===
==== Early career ====
Skoglund signed with Sauerland Promotion at the start of his career.

Skoglund had 15 fights between his February 2010 debut and February 2013, all held in Germany, Denmark and Finland. He was victorious in all of them, 9 by KO/TKO and 6 by decision.

In his 16th fight, Skoglund got his first opportunity for a championship, when he faced fellow undefeated prospect Luke Blackledge (13-0-1, 5 KO's) on April 13, 2013, for both the WBC Youth World light heavyweight and the WBO Youth Intercontinental light heavyweight titles. He won the fight by unanimous decision (96-95, 97–93, 96–94).

Skoglund then took on Lorenzo Di Giacomo in an 8-round non-title fight, on June 15, 2013. Skoglund won the fight by unanimous decision (80-72, 80–72, 80–72).

==== European Union light heavyweight champion ====
On October 19, 2013, Skoglund fought veteran Lolenga Mock for the EBU-EU light heavyweight title. Initially Skoglund's opponent was expected to be Enzo Maccarinelli. However, Maccarinelli was injured and had to be replaced by Mock. Despite being caught and wobbled against the ropes in the third round, Skoglund recovered fast and rallied back to win the fight by unanimous decision (118-110, 117–110, 116–112) after 12 rounds.

In his first defense of his European title, Skoglund took on Adasat Rodriguez on February 1, 2014. After a dominant performance, and well ahead on the scorecards, Skoglund won the fight by TKO in round 12.

Skoglund's second title defense came against Danilo D’Agata on April 12, 2014. He won the fight by TKO in round 9.

On September 13, 2014, Skoglund fought Stefano Abatangelo for his third defense of his European title as well as for the vacant IBF Inter-Continental light heavyweight title. He was victorious by unanimous decision (118-109, 120–106, 118–108).

After three successful title defenses, Skoglund vacated his EBU-EU title in October, 2013, to pursue a world title.

==== International titles ====
On December 13, 2014, Skoglund faced veteran Glen Johnson in a non-title fight. He won the fight by unanimous decision after 10 rounds (97-93, 98–92, 97–93).

In February, 2015 it was revealed that Skoglund was set to undergo surgery for a back injury, which would put him out from competition for six months.

Skoglund returned to defend his IBF Inter-Continental light heavyweight title against Oleksandr Cherviak on September 19, 2015. This marked the first time in his pro career that Skoglund fought in his native Sweden. This was also the first time a male boxing fight for a major title took place in Sweden since the ban on professional boxing in 1969, which was lifted in 2006. Skoglund defended his title by unanimous decision (120-108, 120–108, 119–109).

He fought Derek Edwards in a 10-round non-title fight on December 19, 2015, which he won by unanimous decision (99-92, 100–90, 99–91).

On April 23, 2016, Skoglund fought Ryno Liebenberg (17-2, 11 KO's) for the vacant IBO International light heavyweight title. He won the fight by unanimous decision (117-111, 117–111, 115–113).

In his next fight, Skoglund fought for another minor belt, the vacant WBA International light heavyweight title, against Shpetim Shala (21-1-1, 8 KO's). The bout was first expected to take place on October 28, 2016, but was later postponed to December 9, 2016. Skoglund won the fight by knockout, after dropping Shala three times, all in round 11.

=== Super-middleweight ===
==== World Boxing Super Series ====
On 28 July 2017, it was confirmed that Skoglund would drop down to super-middleweight to join the inaugural World Boxing Super Series, where the winner would receive a prize money and the Muhammad Ali Trophy. Other participants in the tournament included WBA champion George Groves, IBO champion Chris Eubank Jr., WBC #1 contender Callum Smith, former world title holder Juergen Braehmer and undefeated contenders Robert Brant, Avni Yildirim and Jamie Cox.

===== Skoglund vs. Smith =====
At the draft Gala, which took place at the famous Grimaldi Forum in Monaco, Skoglund was chosen by Callum Smith (22-0, 17 KO's) in the quarter-finals. Smith, who was second-seeded for the tournament, said he felt Skoglund was 'stylistically the best fight' for him. Smith also admitted that, on paper, Skoglund was the best boxer he had been scheduled against. The fight was the inaugural bout of the super middleweight tournament. The WBC announced that the fight would be for their Diamond belt.

The fight took place on September 16, 2017, at Echo Arena in Smith's hometown, Liverpool. Smith beat Skoglund by unanimous decision to win one of four quarter-finals in front of his home crowd in Liverpool. The officials scored the fight 116–112, 117–110 and 117–111 all in favor of Smith. Early on, the fight appeared to be a mismatch with Smith outclassing his opponent. However, Skoglund got himself into the fight in the middle rounds behind his consistent jab and head movement, giving Smith a bloody nose. Smith would make his own surge late in the fight, scoring a knockdown in round 11 and earning a unanimous decision.

=== Injury ===
In November 2017, Matchroom Boxing announced that Skoglund would face Commonwealth champion Rocky Fielding (25-1, 14 KO's) on December for the WBC Silver super middleweight title, in the undercard of Tony Bellew vs. David Haye II. The event was scrapped after Haye suffered an injury.

On 8 December 2017, Skoglund suffered a brain hemorrhage during a sparring session in his hometown, Nyköping. He was put into a medically induced coma and had surgery. Skoglund was awakened from the coma in January 2018 and was seen responsive and walking with the help of a crutch. A tweet was posted to his Twitter account which read "Finally back where I belong. Thanks for all the support I really need it. Will speak more about what happened when I’m ready." Skoglund will undergo extensive, long-term rehab. The incident is being investigated by the Swedish Work Environment Authority. Professional boxing is under strict supervision in Sweden and was banned until 2006.

In June, 2019, Skoglund appeared in London as a corner man for his teammate Anthony Yigit who was fighting on June 28. Skoglund had also been in Yigit's corner in Frankfurt a month earlier. In an interview Skoglund gave an update on his health status, claiming that he was back in fitness training and rehabilitation, doing better each day, even if he still didn't feel completely recovered.

== Professional boxing record ==
| 27 fights | 26 wins | 1 loss |
|---|---|---|
| By knockout | 12 | 0 |
| By decision | 14 | 1 |

| No. | Result | Record | Opponent | Type | Round, time | Date | Location | Notes |
|---|---|---|---|---|---|---|---|---|
| 27 | Loss | 26–1 | Callum Smith | UD | 12 | 16 Sep 2017 | Echo Arena, Liverpool, England | World Boxing Super Series: super-middleweight quarter final |
| 26 | Win | 26–0 | Shpetim Shala | KO | 11 (12), 2:51 | 9 Dec 2016 | Rosvalla Arena, Nyköping, Sweden | Won vacant WBA International light heavyweight title |
| 25 | Win | 25–0 | Ryno Liebenberg | UD | 12 | 23 Apr 2016 | Hovet, Stockholm, Sweden | Won vacant IBO International light heavyweight title |
| 24 | Win | 24–0 | Derek Edwards | UD | 10 | 19 Dec 2015 | Rosvalla Arena, Nyköping, Sweden | |
| 23 | Win | 23–0 | Oleksandr Cherviak | UD | 12 | 19 Sep 2015 | Rosvalla Arena, Nyköping, Sweden | Retained IBF Inter-Continental light heavyweight title |
| 22 | Win | 22–0 | Glen Johnson | UD | 10 | 13 Dec 2014 | MusikTeatret, Albertslund, Denmark | |
| 21 | Win | 21–0 | Stefano Abatangelo | UD | 12 | 13 Sep 2014 | TAP 1, Copenhagen, Denmark | Retained European Union light heavyweight title; Won IBF Inter-Continental light heavyweight title |
| 20 | Win | 20–0 | Danilo D'Agata | TKO | 9 (12), 2:57 | 12 Apr 2014 | Blue Water Dokken, Esbjerg, Denmark | Retained European Union light heavyweight title |
| 19 | Win | 19–0 | Adasat Rodriguez | TKO | 12 (12), 0:58 | 1 Feb 2014 | Arena Nord, Frederikshavn, Denmark | Retained European Union light heavyweight title |
| 18 | Win | 18–0 | Lolenga Mock | UD | 12 | 19 Oct 2013 | Sydbank Arena, Kolding, Denmark | Won European Union light heavyweight title |
| 17 | Win | 17–0 | Lorenzo Di Giacomo | UD | 8 | 15 Jun 2013 | Ceres Arena, Aarhus, Denmark | |
| 16 | Win | 16–0 | Luke Blackledge | UD | 10 | 13 Apr 2013 | Arena Nord, Frederikshavn, Denmark | Won WBC Youth and WBO Youth Inter-Continental light heavyweight titles |
| 15 | Win | 15–0 | Attila Baran | TKO | 2 (10), 2:02 | 9 Feb 2013 | Blue Water Dokken, Esbjerg, Denmark | |
| 14 | Win | 14–0 | Joe Ainscough | TKO | 3 (8), 0:15 | 8 Dec 2012 | Jyske Bank Boxen, Herning, Denmark | |
| 13 | Win | 13–0 | Gyorgy Marosi | TKO | 1 (8), 2:59 | 10 Nov 2012 | Helsinki Ice Hall, Helsinki, Finland | |
| 12 | Win | 12–0 | Ivan Maslov | UD | 8 | 22 Sep 2012 | Arena Nord, Frederikshavn, Denmark | |
| 11 | Win | 11–0 | Fouad Nasri | KO | 2 (6), 0:42 | 2 Jun 2012 | Herning Kongrescenter, Herning, Denmark | |
| 10 | Win | 10–0 | Pablo Sosa | UD | 8 | 19 May 2012 | Parken Stadium, Copenhagen, Denmark | |
| 9 | Win | 9–0 | Alberto Antenucci | KO | 2 (8), 2:05 | 21 Apr 2012 | Arena Nord, Frederikshavn, Denmark | |
| 8 | Win | 8–0 | Juan Nelongo | KO | 4 (6), 0:36 | 18 Feb 2012 | Brøndbyhallen, Brøndby, Denmark | |
| 7 | Win | 7–0 | Amine Blali | UD | 4 | 3 Dec 2011 | Hartwall Arena, Helsinki, Finland | |
| 6 | Win | 6–0 | Volodymyr Borovskyy | UD | 6 | 7 May 2011 | Jahnsportforum, Neubrandenburg, Germany | |
| 5 | Win | 5–0 | Valerijs Rogozins | TKO | 1 (4), 1:47 | 12 Feb 2011 | RWE-Rhein-Ruhr Sporthalle, Mülheim, Germany | |
| 4 | Win | 4–0 | Mile Nikolic | TKO | 1 (4), 3:00 | 18 Dec 2010 | Max-Schmeling-Halle, Berlin, Germany | |
| 3 | Win | 3–0 | Vladimir Spasojevic | UD | 4 | 20 Nov 2010 | Herning Kongrescenter, Herning, Denmark | |
| 2 | Win | 2–0 | Sladko Cizicz | KO | 2 (4), 0:44 | 15 May 2010 | Herning Kongrescenter, Herning, Denmark | |
| 1 | Win | 1–0 | Istvan Laboda | UD | 4 | 1 May 2010 | Weser-Ems-Halle, Oldenburg, Germany | |
