= Canelo Álvarez vs. Avni Yıldırım =

Boxing match

- Date: 27 February 2021
- Venue: Hard Rock Stadium, Miami Gardens, Florida, U.S.
- Title(s) on the line: WBA (Super), WBC and The Ring super middleweight titles

Tale of the tape
Boxer	Saúl Álvarez	Avni Yıldırım
Nickname	Canelo ("Cinnamon")	Mr. Robot
Hometown	Guadalajara, Jalisco, Mexico	Sivas, Sivas Province, Turkey
Pre-fight record	54–1–2 (36 KO)	21–2 (12 KO)
Age	30 years, 7 months	29 years, 6 months
Height	5 ft 8 in (173 cm)	5 ft 11 1/2 in (182 cm)
Weight	167.6 lb (76 kg)	167.6 lb (76 kg)
Style	Orthodox	Orthodox
Recognition	WBA (Super), WBC, and The Ring; Super Middleweight Champion; TBRB; No. 1 Ranked Super Middleweight; The Ring No. 1 ranked pound-for-pound fighter 4-division world champion	WBC; No. 1 Ranked Super Middleweight; WBA; No. 9 Ranked Super Middleweight

Result
- Álvarez win via 3rd-round corner retirement

Canelo Álvarez vs. Avni Yıldırım was a professional boxing match contested on 27 February 2021, for the WBA, WBC and The Ring super middleweight championship.

== Background ==
After his 19 December 2020 victory over Callum Smith to win the unified super middleweight championship, it was announced on 20 January 2021 that Álvarez would be defending his newly won super middleweight titles against his WBC mandatory challenger Avni Yıldırım on 27 February at the Hard Rock Stadium, Miami Gardens, Florida. The bout attracted criticism due to many perceiving Yıldırım, who had not been in the ring since he lost a technical split decision to Anthony Dirrell two years prior in February 2019, to be vastly over-matched. Yıldırım had been named to the mandatory position as a result of the controversial nature of his loss to Dirrell, however, he had remained sidelined due to injury and the COVID-19 pandemic. Álvarez, who was mandated to face Yıldırım in order to retain the WBC title despite being heavily favored, was dismissive of the critics, saying "I really don't have to give any explanation because they're never gonna be happy with anything... He [Yıldırım] has lots of courage. He can be dangerous at any moment because he is a strong fighter." Yıldırım's only other loss on his record had come four years earlier against Chris Eubank Jr. in October 2017.

Álvarez was a 50 to 1 on favourite to win.

== The fight ==
The bout would prove to be as one sided as many had predicted. Álvarez would dominate the bout before Yıldırım's corner threw in the towel at the end of the third round. According to CompuBox stats, Álvarez outlanded Yıldırım 67 (40%) to 11 (11%) in total punches.

== Aftermath ==
Álvarez later stated that he had contracted COVID-19 prior to the fight and only had one month to train.

== Undercard ==
Confirmed bouts:

Winner	Loser	Weight division/title belt(s) disputed	Result
(Puerto Rico) McWilliams Arroyo	(Mexico) Abraham Rodriguez	WBC Interim World Flyweight title	5th round TKO
(China) Zhilei Zhang	(United States) Jerry Forrest	Heavyweight (10 rounds)	Majority draw
(United States) Diego Pacheco	(United States) Rodolfo Gomez Jr	Super middleweight (8 rounds)	Unanimous decision
(United States) Marc Castro	(United States) John Moraga	Super featherweight (4 rounds)	2nd round TKO
Preliminary bouts
(United States) Keyshawn Davis	(The Bahamas) Lester Brown	Lightweight (4 rounds)	2nd round TKO
(United States) Aaron Aponte	(United States) Harry Gigliotti	Super lightweight (4 rounds)	Unanimous decision
(United States) Alexis Espino	(United States) Ashton Sykes	Super middleweight (6 rounds)	5th round KO

== Broadcasting ==
Country	Broadcaster
Mexico	Azteca
United Kingdom	Sky Sports
United States	DAZN

Preceded by vs. Callum Smith	Canelo Álvarez's bouts 27 February 2021	Succeeded by vs. Billy Joe Saunders
Preceded by vs. Anthony Dirrell	Avni Yıldırım's bouts 27 February 2021	Succeeded by vs. Jack Cullen
