= Zach Parker =

British boxer (born 1994)

Personal information
- Nationality: British
- Born: 2 June 1994 (age 32) Swadlincote, Derbyshire, England
- Height: 6 ft 0 in (183 cm)
- Weight: Super-middleweight

Boxing career
- Stance: Orthodox (Note: Listed by BoxRec as orthodox, but regularly switch-hits as a southpaw.)

Boxing record
- Total fights: 29
- Wins: 26
- Win by KO: 18
- Losses: 3

Zach Parker (born 2 June 1994) is a British professional boxer who held the British super-middleweight title from 2018 to 2019.

== Professional career ==
Parker made his professional debut on 11 July 2015 against Lewis van Poetsch at the Chase Leisure Centre in Cannock, Staffordshire, winning via fourth-round technical knockout (TKO).

After winning his first 16 fights, 11 by stoppage, he faced Darryll Williams on 3 November 2018 for the vacant British super-middleweight title at The SSE Hydro in Glasgow, Scotland, on the undercard of the World Boxing Super Series super lightweight quarter-final fight between Josh Taylor and Ryan Martin. Parker won the fight via split decision with two judges scoring the bout 117–112 and 115–114 in favour of Parker and the third scoring it 115–113 to Williams. After suffering a dislocated left shoulder and torn rotator cuff in the second round, Parker boxed from the southpaw stance, one handed, behind the right jab to secure a highly controversial split decision win which many believed should have been given to Williams.

Parker lost to Joshua Buatsi by majority decision over 10 rounds at Co-op Live Arena in Manchester on 1 November 2025. Two of the ringside judges scored the bout 96–94 for his opponent, while the third had it a 95–95 draw. He lost his second successive fight when Umar Dzambekov knocked him out in the fourth round at the Copper Box Arena in London on 7 November 2026.

== Professional boxing record ==
29 fights	26 wins	3 losses
By knockout	18	2
By decision	8	1

No.	Result	Record	Opponent	Type	Round, time	Date	Location	Notes
29	Loss	26–3	Umar Dzambekov	KO	4 (10), 1:47	7 Nov 2026	Copper Box Arena, London, England	
28	Loss	26–2	Joshua Buatsi	MD	10	1 Nov 2025	Co-op Live, Manchester, England	For vacant WBA International light-heavyweight title
27	Win	26–1	Mickael Diallo	UD	10	8 Feb 2025	Co-op Live, Manchester, England	
26	Win	25–1	Jack Arnfield	TKO	4 (10), 1:06	20 Jul 2024	Resorts World Arena, Birmingham, England	
25	Win	24–1	Tyron Zeuge	UD	10	16 Mar 2024	Resorts World Arena, Birmingham, England	
24	Win	23–1	Khalid Graidia	RTD	7 (10), 3:00	23 Sep 2023	Wembley Arena, London, England	
23	Loss	22–1	John Ryder	RTD	5 (12), 0:01	26 Nov 2022	The O2 Arena, London, England	For vacant WBO interim super-middleweight title
22	Win	22–0	Marcus Morrison	TKO	4 (10), 1:34	6 Nov 2021	Utilita Arena, Birmingham, England	Retained WBO International super-middleweight title
21	Win	21–0	Sherzod Husanov	KO	1 (10), 2:47	10 Jul 2021	Royal Albert Hall, London, England	Retained WBO International super-middleweight title
20	Win	20–0	Vaughn Alexander	KO	2 (10), 1:15	26 Mar 2021	Copper Box Arena, London, England	Retained WBO International super-middleweight title
19	Win	19–0	Rohan Murdock	TKO	11 (12), 2:58	7 Mar 2020	Manchester Arena, Manchester, England	Won vacant WBO International super-middleweight title
18	Win	18–0	Steven Crambert	TKO	4 (8), 2:28	18 May 2019	The SSE Hydro, Glasgow, Scotland	
17	Win	17–0	Daryll Williams	SD	12	3 Nov 2018	The SSE Hydro, Glasgow, Scotland	Won vacant British super-middleweight title
16	Win	16–0	Geard Ajetović	UD	8	14 Jul 2018	Baden-Arena, Offenburg, Germany	
15	Win	15–0	Adasat Rodriguez	TKO	2 (10), 2:59	17 Feb 2018	Manchester Arena, Manchester, England	
14	Win	14–0	Matingu Kindele	UD	8	7 Oct 2017	Hanns-Martin-Schleyer-Halle, Stuttgart, Germany	
13	Win	13–0	Luke Blackledge	TKO	1 (10), 2:40	16 Sep 2017	Echo Arena, Liverpool, England	
12	Win	12–0	Baptiste Castegnaro	TKO	8 (8), 2:45	17 Jun 2017	Guild Hall, Preston, England	
11	Win	11–0	Bartlomiej Grafka	TKO	5 (8), 2:40	15 Apr 2017	Hilton Hotel, Blackpool, England	
10	Win	10–0	Bradley Pryce	TKO	4 (6), 1:53	21 Jan 2017	Guild Hall, Preston, England	
9	Win	9–0	David Bauza	KO	1 (4), 1:45	10 Dec 2016	Tewkesbury School, Tewkesbury, England	
8	Win	8–0	Adam Jones	PTS	6	19 Nov 2016	Town Hall, Walsall, England	
7	Win	7–0	Raimonds Sniedze	TKO	4 (4), 2:55	2 Sep 2016	Banks's Stadium, Walsall, England	
6	Win	6–0	Gordan Glisic	TKO	1 (4), 1:06	21 May 2016	Civic Hall, Bedworth, England	
5	Win	5–0	Vaidas Belciauskas	PTS	4	23 Apr 2016	The Deco, Northampton, England	
4	Win	4–0	Jamie Ambler	KO	2 (6), 2:38	5 Mar 2016	Genting Arena, Birmingham, England	
3	Win	3–0	Mark Till	PTS	4	20 Nov 2015	Hatherley Manor Hotel, Gloucester, England	
2	Win	2–0	Samet Hyuseinov	RTD	3 (4), 3:00	17 Oct 2015	Barclaycard Arena, Birmingham, England	
1	Win	1–0	Lewis van Poetsch	TKO	4 (4), 0:39	11 Jul 2015	Chase Leisure Centre, Cannock, England	

== Notes ==
Sporting positions
Regional boxing titles
Vacant Title last held by Rocky Fielding	British super-middleweight champion 3 November 2018 – June 2019; Vacated	Vacant Title next held by Lerrone Richards
Vacant Title last held by Lerrone Richards	WBO International super-middleweight champion 7 March 2020 – 26 November 2022; Failed to win interim world title	Vacant Title next held by Diego Pacheco
