= Canelo Álvarez vs. Daniel Jacobs =

2019 boxing match

- Date: 4 May 2019
- Venue: T-Mobile Arena; Paradise, Nevada, United States
- Title(s) on the line: WBA, WBC, IBF and The Ring middleweight titles

Tale of the tape
Boxer	Saúl Álvarez	Daniel Jacobs
Nickname	Canelo ("Cinnamon")	The Miracle Man
Hometown	Guadalajara, Jalisco, Mexico	Brooklyn, New York, U.S.
Purse	$35,000,000	$10,000,000
Pre-fight record	51–1–2 (35 KO)	35–2 (29 KO)
Age	28 years, 9 months	32 years, 3 months
Height	5 ft 8 in (173 cm)	6 ft 0 in (183 cm)
Weight	159 1/2 lb (72 kg)	160 lb (73 kg)
Style	Orthodox	Orthodox
Recognition	WBA, WBC, TBRB and The Ring; Middleweight Champion; The Ring No. 3 ranked pound-for-pound fighter 2-division world champion	IBF; Middleweight Champion; The Ring/TBRB; No. 2 Ranked Middleweight

Result
- Álvarez wins via unanimous decision (116–112, 115–113, 115–113)

Canelo Álvarez vs. Daniel Jacobs was a professional boxing match contested on 4 May 2019, for the WBA, WBC, IBF and The Ring Middleweight championship.

== Background ==
After moving up to Super middleweight in December 2018 to defeat Rocky Fielding, Canelo Álvarez announced in January 2019 he would return to the Middleweight division to face Daniel Jacobs in an attempt to unify his WBA, WBC and The Ring belts with Jacobs' IBF title. Álvarez would state in the announcement "I have no doubt that I will be victorious and that I'll be one step away from becoming the undisputed middleweight world champion."

Jacobs expressed confidence based on his strong showing against Gennady Golovkin two years earlier, "People said GGG hit too hard and I took everything he had and there’s no way that Canelo hits that hard".

The two boxers had to be pulled apart during the weigh-in. The bout included a rehydration clause of 10 pounds. But Jacobs came in 3.7lb over a contracted rehydration limit of 170lbs the morning of the bout (a stipulation demanded by Álvarez’s team), costing him nearly $1,000,000 of his $10,000,000 guaranteed purse.

== The fight ==
Canelo was the busier fighter in the early rounds, Jacobs using his rangy left jab to keep Álvarez at bay however the Mexican's elusive upper-body movement prevented him from scoring frequently. A switch to southpaw in round five and seven, gave Jacobs some success and a big left hook in ninth round momentarily stopped Canelo in his tracks. For the most part however Álvarez's more accurate puncher and superior defensive work kept him in control of the action. At the end of 12 rounds all three judges scored the bout for Álvarez, with two scores of 115–113 and one of 116–112 giving him a unanimous decision victory.

== Aftermath ==
Speaking after the bout Álvarez said "It was just what we thought, we knew he was going to be a difficult fighter. It was just what we thought because of the style of fight that he brings, but we just did our job." Jacobs would admit that the task of making the middleweight limit was become difficult, saying "It is taking a toll on my body and it’s showing, I might have outgrown the middleweight division, and I might take my talents to super middleweight."

Despite now holding three of the four belts at middleweight, Álvarez opted not to face WBO titleholder Demetrius Andrade, to attempt to become the first Undisputed middleweight champion since Jermain Taylor in 2005. Instead he would move up two weight divisions to face WBO Light heavyweight champion Sergey Kovalev.

== Undercard ==
Confirmed bouts:

Winner	Loser	Weight division/title belt(s) disputed	Result
(United States) Vergil Ortiz Jr.	(United States) Mauricio Herrera	Light welterweight (10 rounds)	3rd round KO
(United States) Joseph Diaz	(Nicaragua) Freddy Fonseca	vacant WBA Gold super featherweight title	7th round TKO
(United States) Lamont Roach Jr.	(Puerto Rico) Jonathan Oquendo	NABO and WBO International Super featherweight titles	Unanimous decision
Preliminary bouts
(United States) Anthony Young	(United States) Sadam Ali	vacant WBC USA Silver Welterweight title	3rd round TKO
(United Kingdom) John Ryder	(Australia) Bilal Akkawy	vacant WBA interim Super middleweight title	3rd round TKO
(Armenia) Aram Avagyan	(United States) Francisco Esparza	WBC International Silver Featherweight	Unanimous decision
(United States) Alexis Espino	(United States) Billy Wagner	Super middleweight (4 rounds)	Unanimous decision

Preceded by vs. Rocky Fielding	Canelo Álvarez's bouts 4 May 2019	Succeeded by vs. Sergey Kovalev
Preceded by vs. Sergiy Derevyanchenko	Daniel Jacobs's bouts 4 May 2019	Succeeded by vs. Julio César Chávez Jr.
