= Chris Eubank Jr vs Avni Yildirim =

Boxing match

- Date: 7 October 2017
- Venue: Hanns-Martin-Schleyer-Halle, Stuttgart, Baden-Württemberg, Germany
- Title(s) on the line: IBO super middleweight title

Tale of the tape
Boxer	(United Kingdom) Chris Eubank Jr	(Turkey) Avni Yildirim
Nickname	"Next Gen"	"Mr Robot"
Hometown	Brighton, East Sussex, UK	Sivas, Sivas Province, Turkey
Pre-fight record	25–1 (19 KO)	16–0 (10 KO)
Age	28 years	26 years, 2 months
Height	5 ft 11 in (180 cm)	5 ft 11 1/2 in (182 cm)
Weight	167 7/10 lb (76 kg)	168 lb (76 kg)
Style	Orthodox	Orthodox
Recognition	IBF; No. 2 Ranked Super Middleweight; WBC; No. 4 Ranked Super Middleweight; WBA; No. 8 Ranked Super Middleweight; TBRB; No. 6 Ranked Super Middleweight; The Ring; No. 7 Ranked Super Middleweight; IBO; Super Middleweight Champion	WBC/WBA; No. 3 Ranked Super Middleweight; IBF; No. 4 Ranked Super Middleweight

Result
- Eubank Jr defeats Yıldırım in the 3rd round via KO.

Chris Eubank Jr vs Avni Yildirim was a professional boxing match contested on 7 October 2017, for the IBO super middleweight championship. The bout was also a WBC super middleweight title eliminator.

== Background ==
At the WBSS draft Gala, held at the Grimaldi Forum in Monaco on 8 July 2017, Chris Eubank Sr., picked the undefeated Avni Yıldırım to face his son, with the winner to face the winner of the all British clash between George Groves and Jamie Cox. The fight was confirmed following Eubank Jr's win over Arthur Abraham on the 15 July. Promoter Kalle Sauerland said official confirmation of a venue and date would be announced in the coming weeks. On 8 August 2017 it was announced that the fight would take place on 7 October at the Hanns-Martin-Schleyer-Halle in Stuttgart, Germany, marking it the second time Eubank would be fighting outside the UK since turning professional. It was also the second quarter final of the WBSS following Callum Smith's victory over Erik Skoglund three weeks earlier.

During a pre fight press conference, Ahmet Öner, Yıldırım's manager, got into a one-sided confrontation with Eubank's camp. Öner called Eubank arrogant, threatened to knock someone out, and yelled "When you laugh, you son of a bitch, I fuck your wife in your bed!" at a man off-stage.

The undercard featured a 10-round bout between former Olympians Stefan Härtel and Viktor Polyakov, which was controversially won by Härtel by majority decision. Upon being announced, the decision was booed by the audience at the Hanns-Martin-Schleyer-Halle. A brawl broke out in the stands moments before the main event.

== The fight ==
On fight night, Eubank Jr used his hand speed and power shots to dominate Yıldırım. An uppercut in the first round, caused Yildirim's knee to touch the canvas prompting referee Leszek Jankowiak to administer a ten count. In the third round a flurry of unanswered shots ending with a left hook to the head dropped Yıldırım. The referee stopped the fight without completing a count, whilst Yıldırım attempted to get up.

== Aftermath ==
At ringside after the fight, Eubank Jr stated, "I'm here to dominate this tournament. I'm sending a message out there that I'm coming. George Groves, get through your next fight so we can give the boxing fans what they want to see."

The next quarter final was held a week later between Groves and Cox.

== Undercard ==
Confirmed bouts:

== Broadcasting ==
Country	Broadcaster
Baltic & Nordic countries	Viasat
Belgium	VOO
Bulgaria	Nova
Canada	Super Channel
Germany	SAT.1
Russia	Match! Boets
Singapore	StarHub
Sub-Saharan Africa	TVMS
Turkey	Tivibu Sports
United Kingdom	ITV
United States	Audience
Ukraine	Inter

Preceded by vs Arthur Abraham	Chris Eubank Jr's bouts 7 October 2017	Succeeded by vs George Groves
Preceded by vs Marco Antonio Peribán	Avni Yildirim's bouts 7 October 2017	Succeeded by vs Attila Korda
