= Luke Blackledge =

English boxer (born 1990)

Personal information
- Nickname: Robbo
- Nationality: English
- Born: Luke Robinson; 6 August 1990 (age 35) Clitheroe, England
- Weight: Super-middleweight; Light-heavyweight

Boxing career
- Stance: Orthodox

Boxing record
- Total fights: 41
- Wins: 27
- Win by KO: 9
- Losses: 12
- Draws: 2

Luke Robinson (born 6 August 1990), better known as Luke Blackledge, is an English professional boxer. He held the Commonwealth super-middleweight title from 2015 to 2016 and challenged once for the British super-middleweight title in 2016. Upon turning professional, he changed his name from Robinson to Blackledge in order to avoid confusion with another English boxer of the same name.

== Professional boxing record ==
37 fights	26 wins	9 losses
By knockout	9	4
By decision	17	5
Draws	2	

No.	Result	Record	Opponent	Type	Round, time	Date	Location	Notes
37	Loss	26–9–2	Denis Radovan	RTD	4 (8), 3:00	26 Oct 2019	The O2 Arena, London, England	
36	Loss	26–8–2	Ollie Pattison	PTS	6	20 Jul 2019	York Hall, London, England	
35	Loss	26–7–2	Chad Sugden	PTS	8	6 Jul 2019	Harvey Hadden Sports Village, Nottingham, England	
34	Win	26–6–2	Darryl Sharp	PTS	6	11 May 2019	Bolton Whites Hotel, Bolton, England	
33	Win	25–6–2	Harry Matthews	PTS	6	16 Dec 2018	Victoria Warehouse, Manchester, England	
32	Loss	24–6–2	Anthony Fox	PTS	6	27 Oct 2018	Municipal Hall, Colne, England	
31	Win	24–5–2	Darren Snow	TKO	2 (6), 2:40	17 Aug 2018	Municipal Hall, Colne, England	
30	Loss	23–5–2	Zach Parker	TKO	1 (10), 2:40	16 Sep 2017	Echo Arena, Liverpool, England	
29	Loss	23–4–2	Lolenga Mock	UD	10	17 Jun 2017	Ceres Arena, Aarhus, Denmark	
28	Win	23–3–2	Olegs Fedotovs	TKO	4 (6), 2:01	19 May 2017	Bolton Whites Hotel, Bolton, England	
27	Loss	22–3–2	Callum Smith	TKO	10 (12), 2:34	10 Dec 2016	Manchester Arena, Manchester, England	For British super-middleweight title
26	Win	22–2–2	Elvis Dube	PTS	6	22 Oct 2016	Bolton Whites Hotel, Bolton, England	
25	Win	21–2–2	Ishmael Tetteh	KO	5 (12), 0:57	13 May 2016	Bolton Whites Hotel, Bolton, England	Retained Commonwealth super middleweight title
24	Win	20–2–2	Lee Markham	UD	12	10 Oct 2015	Manchester Arena, Manchester, England	Retained Commonwealth super-middleweight title
23	Win	19–2–2	Liam Cameron	UD	12	4 Apr 2015	King George's Hall, Blackburn, England	Won vacant Commonwealth super-middleweight title
22	Win	18–2–2	Konstantin Alexandrov	PTS	8	22 Nov 2014	King George's Hall, Blackburn, England	
21	Win	17–2–2	Philip Kotey	UD	10	6 Sep 2014	King George's Hall, Blackburn, England	Won vacant WBC International Silver super-middleweight title
20	Win	16–2–2	Darren McKenna	TKO	3 (4), 1:29	12 Jul 2014	Villa Park, Birmingham, England	
19	Win	15–2–2	Jody Meikle	PTS	6	11 Apr 2014	Municipal Hall, Colne, England	
18	Loss	14–2–2	Rocky Fielding	TKO	1 (12), 2:32	23 Nov 2013	Phones 4u Arena, Manchester, England	For Commonwealth super-middleweight title
17	Win	14–1–2	Iain Jackson	PTS	4	12 Oct 2013	De Vere Whites Hotel, Bolton, England	
16	Draw	13–1–2	Alistair Warren	TD	2 (10), 3:00	20 Jul 2013	De Vere Whites Hotel, Bolton, England	For vacant Southern Area super-middleweight title; Fight stopped after Warren suffered a cut from an accidental head clash
15	Loss	13–1–1	Erik Skoglund	UD	10	13 Apr 2013	Arena Nord, Frederikshavn, Denmark	For vacant WBC Youth and WBO Youth Inter-Continental light-heavyweight titles
14	Win	13–0–1	Scott Edgar	TKO	4 (4), 1:21	1 Mar 2013	Wythenshawe Forum, Manchester, England	
13	Win	12–0–1	Nathan King	PTS	10	9 Dec 2012	De Vere Whites Hotel, Bolton, England	
12	Draw	11–0–1	Farai Musiyiwa	PTS	6	2 Nov 2012	City Hall, Hull, England	
11	Win	11–0	Carl Wild	PTS	10	7 Oct 2012	De Vere Whites Hotel, Bolton, England	
10	Win	10–0	Mads Larsen	KO	4 (8), 1:20	2 Jun 2012	Herning Kongrescenter, Herning, Denmark	
9	Win	9–0	Matthew Barney	PTS	6	11 Mar 2011	Hermitage Leisure Centre, Whitwick, England	
8	Win	8–0	Robert Studzinski	TKO	3 (6), 0:29	25 Feb 2012	Sports Centre, Oldham, England	
7	Win	7–0	Dean Walker	PTS	4	16 Dec 2011	Municipal Hall, Colne, England	
6	Win	6–0	Phill Fury	PTS	6	12 Nov 2011	EventCity, Manchester, England	
5	Win	5–0	Joe Walsh	TKO	1 (4), 1:38	28 Jul 2011	Bowlers Exhibition Centre, Manchester, England	
4	Win	4–0	Phil Goodwin	PTS	4	10 Jul 2011	Municipal Hall, Colne, England	
3	Win	3–0	Adam Stretton	PTS	4	18 Jun 2011	Robin Park Centre, Wigan, England	
2	Win	2–0	James Tucker	PTS	6	4 Mar 2011	Municipal Hall, Colne, England	
1	Win	1–0	Stewart Tordoff	TKO	5 (6), 0:41	22 Oct 2010	Robin Park Centre, Wigan, England	
