= Callum Smith =

Irish boxer (born 1990)

Personal information
- Nickname: Mundo
- Born: Callum John Smith; 23 April 1990 (age 36) Liverpool, England
- Height: 6 ft 3 in (191 cm)
- Weight: Super-middleweight; Light-heavyweight

Boxing career
- Reach: 78 in (198 cm)
- Stance: Orthodox

Boxing record
- Total fights: 33
- Wins: 31
- Win by KO: 22
- Losses: 2
Medal record
Men's amateur boxing
Representing England
Commonwealth Games
Silver medal – second place	2010 Delhi	Welterweight
GB Championships
Gold medal – first place	2010 Liverpool	Welterweight

Callum John Smith (born 23 April 1990) is a British professional boxer. He has held the World Boxing Organization (WBO) interim light-heavyweight title since 2025. Previously, he held the World Boxing Association (WBA) (Super version) and Ring magazine super-middleweight titles from 2018 to 2020. Both of his titles were won during the World Boxing Super Series tournament, in which he won the Muhammad Ali Trophy. At regional level, he has held multiple super-middleweight championships, including the British and European titles between 2015 and 2017. As an amateur, he won a silver medal at the 2010 Commonwealth Games. He is the youngest of the Smith brothers—Paul, Stephen, and Liam—all of whom are professional boxers.

== Amateur career ==
As an amateur, Smith represented Rotunda ABC in Liverpool at domestic level, where he won the 2010 Great Britain welterweight title and 2011 Great Britain Middleweight title and GB Boxing internationally.

=== 2010 Commonwealth Games ===
At the 2010 Commonwealth Games in New Delhi, India, Smith up kept family tradition by winning a silver medal in the welterweight division, following brothers Paul, who also won silver at the 2002 Commonwealth Games in Manchester, England and Stephen who claimed a gold medal at the 2006 Commonwealth Games in Melbourne, Australia. Triumphs over most notably Aston Brown of Scotland and Carl Hield of The Bahamas saw Smith into the final only to be beaten by Northern Irish Paddy Gallagher.

=== 2012 Olympic qualification tournament ===
Smith's bid to become GB Boxing's light-heavyweight (81 kg) representative at the 2012 Olympic Games in London ended in bitter disappointment and controversy at the final Olympic Qualification Tournament in Trabzon, Turkey. After losing 16:14 in inexplicable fashion to Azerbaijan's Vatan Huseynli in the bout where a win would seal qualification, his hopes now relied on the man who had beat him in the previous round. As three light heavyweight Olympic places were available, the semi-finalist who lost to the eventual winner would take the third spot, however Smith's conqueror Huseynli lost to local Turkish boxer Bahram Muzaffer and Smith missed out on the third qualifying place. Soon after the tournament it was decided by AIBA that an invitational place at the Olympics was to be made available to a boxer of their choice and Smith had been short listed for the position but it was eventually decided in a cruel twist for the Englishman, that the place should be awarded to Boško Drašković of Montenegro, a man who Smith had convincingly out pointed earlier in the tournament. Drašković was eliminated from the Olympics in the first round.

== Professional career ==
=== Super-middleweight ===
==== Early career ====
In October 2012 Smith followed his brothers into the professional ranks, under the promotional banner of Matchroom Sport, and like his siblings, would be coached by Manchester-based trainer Joe Gallagher. It was announced that he would make his debut on the undercard of Carl Froch vs. Yusaf Mack in Nottingham's Capital FM Arena on 17 November 2012. He scored a clear points win against Dan Blackwell over four rounds in his debut contest, however the victor was not entirely satisfied with his performance. The following month Smith returned to the ring for another four round contest at the London Olympia, his opponent was James Tucker and once again 'Mundo' won every round in a comfortable fashion.

In February 2013, on the undercard of Carl Frampton vs. Kiko Martinez at the Odyssey Arena in Belfast, Smith earned his first stoppage win as a professional, halting Irishman Tommy Tolan, who had previously been beaten by Smith's brother Paul, in the opening round. Smith's home debut, on the undercard of Bellew–Chilemba I, at Liverpool's Echo Arena saw another Smith win in similar fashion, again his opponent, Iain Jackson, didn't hear the bell to close the first round. Now 5–0, it was time for Smith to step up his level of opponent and be given a stiffer test than he had previously been provided, the man chosen to provide this test was Latvian Ruslans Pojonisevs, however Smith's ability and punching power may have been under-rated as he made short work of his opponent with another first-round knockout (KO). On 25 May 2013, on the Froch–Kessler II bill at London's O2 Arena, he met unbeaten Ryan Moore (3–0), Smith clearly demonstrated his superiority with an impressive fourth consecutive first-round KO.

==== Domestic and regional success ====
On 21 September 2013 Callum Smith defeated Patrick Mendy in a British record sixth first-round stoppage, and won the vacant English super-middleweight title. On 26 October Smith defeated Ruben Eduardo Acosta (27–8, 10 KOs) via sixth-round knockout to win the vacant WBC International super-middleweight title. Smiths next bout was against French boxer Francois Bastient (43–10, 18 KOs) at the Phones 4u Arena on 19 April. Bastient down in the third round, his corner threw in the towel despite him beating the count of referee Mr Finch.

On 17 May, Smith defeated Tobias Webb via 2nd-round knockout to retain the WBC International title. Smith then defeated 32 year old southpaw Vladine Biosse via unanimous decision on 12 July. Smith was ahead on all 3 judges scorecards by a long way. Smith next fought undefeated Mexican Abraham Hernandez (5–0, 3 KOs) on 16 August. This was Smiths first pro fight in the US where he won by first-round KO. On 4 October 2014 Smith knocked out Uruguayan veteran Rafael Sosa Pintos in round three. Pintos was down three times in the third round. On 22 November Smith fought in his first ever 12 round boxing match. This was also a WBC super-middleweight title eliminator, against 36 year old Serbian Nikola Sjekloca (28–2, 8 KOs). The bout went full 12 rounds, with all the judges scoring it (118–111, 118–110 and 120–108) all in favour of Smith.

Six months after his unanimous decision (UD) win over Sjekloca, Smith returned to action at the National Indoor Arena in Birmingham on 9 May 2015 against Latvian Olegs Fedotovs. Smith won via first-round TKO. On 26 June Smith returned to Echo Arena for the fifth time of his pro career to take on French boxer Christopher Rebrasse (23–3–3, 6 KOs) for the vacant WBC Silver super-middleweight title. The fight went full twelve rounds with the judges scoring it (120–107, 118–110 twice) all in favour of Smith. On 7 November, Smith took on the unbeaten Brit Rocky Fielding (21–0, 12 KOs) at the Echo Arena. Fielding was down three times prior to the stoppage in the first round 5 seconds from the bell. Smith won the vacant British super-middleweight title.

On 2 April 2016 Smith fought French boxer Hadillah Mohoumadi (20–3–1, 15 KOs) at the Echo Arena. This was a WBC super-middleweight title final eliminator and also for the European super-middleweight title. Smith won via first-round TKO.

On 16 May Smith was added to the undercard of Tony Bellew's world title shot at Goodison Park on 29 May alongside heavyweight David Price and lightweight Sean Dodd. Smith joined his older brothers Paul and Stephen on the same card. Smith defeated Cesar Reynoso, via TKO in the sixth round. Smith knocked Reynoso down three times in the contest, dropping him with left hands in round one, four and five. The first knockdown of the fight came from a short left hook to the head of Reynoso in round one. Smith dropped Reynoso with lefts to the body in round four and five.

Smith next fought on the undercard of world middleweight championship fight Gennady Golovkin vs. Kell Brook at the O2 Arena on 10 September 2016. His opponent was announced to be 21-year-old Hungarian boxer Norbert Nemesapati. Smith retained his WBC Silver title retiring Nemesapati after six rounds in their scheduled twelve-round fight. The fight stopped after Smith connected with a hard left to the body. Following the post fight interview, it was noted that Smith was the mandatory for the WBC world title, but would wait until Badou Jack and James DeGale face off in a unification fight in early 2017 before fighting the winner.

Waiting for a world title shot, Smith announced he would fight again before the close of the year. The fight would take place on the undercard of Anthony Joshua vs. Éric Molina on 10 December at the Manchester Arena. It was said that Smith would defend his Lonsdale title against mandatory challenger Luke Blackledge (21–2–2, 7 KOs). Smith successfully defended his British super-middleweight title after stopping Blackledge in the tenth round. Smith knocked Blackledge down in rounds three and eight with big power shots however, Blackledge was completely out in the tenth round with a left hook to the head which dropped him. The medical staff were brought into the ring to check on Blackledge and gave him an oxygen mask, but he was able to get up and leave the ring on his own two feet.

==== World Boxing Super Series ====
On 16 January 2017 the WBC ordered negotiations to begin for a fight between Smith and WBC champion Badou Jack (20–1–3, 12 KOs). This ruled out a potential unification rematch James DeGale was pursuing, although Jack also stated he planned on moving up to light-heavyweight. On 18 January, Jack officially vacated his WBC belt in order to move up to the light-heavyweight division. This meant that former champion Anthony Dirrell would next be in line for a world title fight. At the purse bid on 5 March, Ten Goose Boxing, on behalf of Al Haymon won with a bid of $1.6 million to control promotional rights of the fight. It was reported that Matchroom Sport, who promote Smith put in a bid of $1.2 million. Trainer Joe Gallagher confirmed the fight would take place on 9 September 2017 in Los Angeles. On 30 June, it was reported that the Dirrell camp were trying to move the location of the fight to Flint, Michigan, Dirrell's hometown. Eddie Hearn stated there was nothing in the contracts about allowing the date or venue to change, and they would stand firm on the fight taking place in Los Angeles. Hearn had hoped that Dirrell would join the World Boxing Super Series, so the fight could take place in the quarter-finals, but Dirrell had already refused to enter, meaning Smith would not enter either.

On 6 July 2017, it was confirmed that Smith had joined the inaugural World Boxing Super Series, where the winner would receive a prize money and the Muhammad Ali Trophy. Due to being WBC's number 1 ranked contender at super-middleweight, the WBC had said Smith would fight for their Diamond belt in the quarter-finals. Others in the tournament included WBA champion George Groves, Jürgen Brähmer and undefeated contenders Erik Skoglund and Jamie Cox.

===== Smith vs. Skoglund =====
At the draft Gala, which took place at the famous Grimaldi Forum in Monaco, Smith, who was second-seeded, chose to fight Swedish contender Erik Skoglund (26–0, 12 KOs). Smith explained why he chose Skoglund, saying he felt Skoglund was 'stylistically the best fight' for him. On 19 July, Smith confirmed the fight would take place at the Echo Arena in Liverpool on 16 September 2017. It would also be the first fight of the series. Smith also admitted, on paper, Skoglund is the best boxer he would fight. Skoglund, who had previously fought in Sweden, Finland, Denmark and Germany, said he had no issues with traveling to England, as he was looking to prove himself. Smith dropped Skoglund in the eleventh round en route to win the fight via UD in a hard-fought exciting contest. Smith and Skoglund both showed immense respect for each other throughout the buildup and after the fight. The three judges scored the fight 116–112, 117–110 and 117–111 in favour of Smith, who advanced to the next round tournament and claimed the vacant WBC Diamond belt.

===== Smith vs. Holzken =====
On 27 October 2017, 39 year old former world champion Jürgen Brähmer (49–3, 35 KOs) defeated American boxer Rob Brant to advance to the semi-finals against Smith, with the fight scheduled to take place in early 2018. A couple days later, Smith spoke out stating he would like the fight to take place in his home city of Liverpool, however would be open to fighting anywhere else. On 15 November, promoter Kalle Sauerland stated the fight could take place in Liverpool at the Echo Arena or Germany. Smith's trainer Joe Gallagher believed a fight in Germany would be unfair on Smith, due to Germany being known for its contentious decisions and home fighters receiving questionable wins. He later went on to state the fight should take place on neutral ground, mentioning Monte Carlo, Dublin and Amsterdam as potential locations. On 11 January 2018, the fight was finally announced to take place at the Arena Nürnberger in Nuremberg, Germany on 24 February. On 20 February, four days before the fight, German website boxen1.com reported that Brähmer had withdrawn from the tournament after failing to overcome an illness he had been fighting for a week. Comosa stated the event would still go ahead with a replacement to be announced. 34 year old Dutch kickboxer and boxer Nieky Holzken (13–0, 10 KOs), who was scheduled to fight on the undercard against Dmitry Chudinov, became the frontrunner to replace Brähmer. In a short statement, Brähmer stated he had a 'feverish infection' and apologised to his fans. Promoter Kalle Sauerland later confirmed that Holzken was the reserve fighter and would replace Brähmer and fight Smith.

Smith booked himself a place in the final of the tournament after defeating Holzken via unanimous decision. The three judges scored the fight 118–110, 117–111 and 117–111 in favour of Smith. He used his jab from the opening bell and managed to control the distance throughout the fight, also managing to land his right hand successfully on many occasions. Holzken was the faster and frequently more aggressive fighter, however Smith was far more busier in each round. Each round was the same with Smith standing straight up, jabbing constantly and throwing right hands. In the post-fight, Smith stated, "He was tough but I landed a lot jabs and my hand hurts a little bit. He was awkward, novicey but I'm not engaging in a shoot-out. I'm the better boxer." George Groves faced off with Smith immediately after the interviews took place.

===== Smith vs. Groves =====
On 13 February, it was announced that the final of the super-middleweight tournament would take place at the O2 Arena in London on 2 June 2018. The final was made up after George Groves (28–3, 20 KOs) defeated Chris Eubank Jr. on 17 February and Smith defeating Holzken on 24 February. On 26 February, Groves tweeted that he would be going into surgery. He wrote, "We will be applying to the @WBSuperSeries for a one-month extension and are hopeful of securing this." He hoped to return to the ring by July. On 9 May, Kalle Sauerland explained that Groves could potentially be replaced by Eubank Jr. in the final of the tournament against Smith, however there would be confirmation on the final in the next 10 days. Sauerland stated, "We're working at the moment on all the solutions and scenarios, where George [Groves] is fit and where he isn't. We’re hopeful [Groves will be fit], so we'll see. You can’t start the tournament and then have the final lingering into the next tournament. I'm sorry, that’s not going to happen. We can push a month, but we can’t push it back by three or four months. We have a substitute system. We said that from day one, and that's the situation. We want Groves in the final, but if that's not possible and he doesn't declare himself fit in the next 10 days, we have to find a solution." On 28 May, it was said that Groves would be declared fit with the fight to take place on 14 July. By 6 July, there was still no date set, however according to Kalle Sauerland, the bout was expected to take place in September and likely not in the UK, with some rumours hinting there was a strong interest from Las Vegas and the Middle East. Smith's trainer Joe Gallagher confirmed contracts had been signed. On 27 July, Sauerland announced the fight would take place at a 10,000 capacity arena at the King Abdullah Sports City Complex in Jeddah, Saudi Arabia on 28 September 2018. It was revealed the prize money on offer for the final was £6.1 million, with the winner taking a larger percentage.

After a tight match with the fighters level on the judges' scorecards, Smith defeated Groves via seventh-round KO. The size difference was noticeable as the fight was fought closely throughout the opening six rounds with back and forth action. Early in the fight, Groves established his jab whilst trying to avoid any power shots from Smith, whilst Smith was connecting with his right hand. Smith had more success in round three after a counter-right hand buckled Groves' legs. In round six, Smith backed Groves against the ropes and landed two strong jabs. He later landed a clean left hook which forced Groves to move back. Midway through round seven, Groves landed two body shots, however leaving himself open, Smith landed a left hook, which again shook Groves and forced him to retreat backwards. Groves was hurt at this point and Smith went after Groves against the ropes and landed numerous shots, including a hard body shot and an uppercut, ultimately sending Groves to the canvas. Groves managed to get to one knee, before referee Luis Pabon finished the ten-count, giving Smith the win. After the fight, Smith said, "It's been a long time coming, and there's times when you think, 'I've waited this long for chance. If I don't take it, when will another one come?'... I've said for a long time I'm a big believer in me own abilities. I know how good I am and I knew I'm good enough to become a world champion and become the best on the planet, and I believe I've done that." Groves made no excuses, claiming the shoulder was never an issue in the fight. He also ruled out retirement. Muhammad Ali's daughter presented Smith with the trophy. Smith claimed the WBA super-middleweight title along with the vacant Ring magazine title. Smith became the third super-middleweight after Joe Calzaghe and Andre Ward to win The Ring title. There were four official judges' scorecards. One judge had it even after six rounds at 57–57, two judges had Groves ahead 59–55 and 58–56 and one judge had Smith ahead 59–55.

==== Smith vs. N'Dam N'Jikam ====
On 1 June 2019, on the Anthony Joshua vs Andy Ruiz Jr. undercard, Smith fought Hassan N'Dam N'Jikam, ranked No. 13 by the WBA at super middleweight. Smith dominated N'Dam from the start, dropping him once in the first round, once in the second round and a final third time in the third round. N'Dam gave it his all and even managed to beat the third count, but he didn't seem fit to continue and the referee waved off the fight.

==== Smith vs. Ryder ====
On 23 November 2019, Smith defended his WBA and The Ring super-middleweight titles for the second time against domestic rival John Ryder, who was ranked No. 1 by the WBA and No. 4 by the WBC. Smith emerged victorious via unanimous decision, with one judge scoring the bout 117–111 while the other two scored it 116–112. The result was viewed as controversial by spectators, with many believing Ryder had won.

==== Smith vs. Álvarez ====
On 19 December 2020, Smith attempted the third defence of his WBA and The Ring super middleweight titles against Canelo Álvarez. The vacant WBC super middleweight title was also on the line. Smith was beat down by Álvarez over twelve rounds, suffering a detached left bicep injury, and never seemed to be able to affect Álvarez with his shots. The scorecards were 117–111 and 119–109 twice in favour of Álvarez.

=== Light-heavyweight ===
==== Smith vs. Castillo ====
Following his first professional loss against Canelo Álvarez, Smith moved up in weight and made his debut in the light-heavyweight division against former WBA title challenger Lenin Castillo, on the undercard of Anthony Joshua vs. Oleksandr Usyk on 25 September 2021. Smith defeated Castillo via a brutal second-round knockout that resulted in the latter being stretchered out of the ring.

==== Smith vs. Bauderlique ====
On 20 August 2022, Smith fought Bauderlique in a WBC world title eliminator on the undercard of Oleksandr Usyk vs Anthony Joshua II. Smith finished the fight with a left hook at 1:53 of the fourth round in Jeddah. With this victory, Smith earned his shot at unified light heavyweight world champion Artur Beterbiev, who holds the IBF and WBO titles as well as the WBC belt.

==== Smith vs. Beterbiev ====
On 15 March 2023, Artur Beterbiev (19–0, 19 KOs) was ordered by the WBC to make a mandatory title defense against Smith. As the pair failed to come to terms, a purse bid was called, which was won by Top Rank with a $2,115,000 bid. As the champion, Beterbiev was guaranteed a 70/30% split in his favor, which would earned him a guaranteed $1,330,000, with 10% of the initial sum being set aside for the winner. Smith would walk away with a $571,000 purse. Matchroom Boxing also made a bid, which was $15,000 less than Top Rank's winning bid. Hearn was devastated about losing the bid by such a small margin. He said "I am gutted. Everyone has said they must have known what our bid was to only beat it by that much but in reality when there have been offers made throughout a period of negotiation you know roughly what the other side’s bid will be". The bout was expected to take place in Montreal.

The bout was expected to take place on 19 August at the Videotron Centre in Québec City, Canada. It was to be broadcast in the US on ESPN and Sky Sports in the UK. Beterbiev had not fought in Québec City since 2015. The fight was postponed on 30 July, as Beterbiev was forced to undergo jaw surgery due to a bone infection. The event was rescheduled to take place on 13 January 2024, at the same venue.

Controversy followed in December 2023, when VADA results from urine and blood tests taken from Beterbiev showed "elevated levels of HGH and testosterone". The findings were atypical and not adverse, which meant the fight would still take place. Hearn did not accuse Beterbiev, but wanted more information as to these raised levels, as further testing, also done by VADA showed Beterbiev had normal levels. His trainer Marc Ramsey called Hearn a hypocrite. He went on to say that there was no positive test, or the fight would be cancelled. Beterbiev was tested three times after the atypical findings, with all tests coming through negative. The WBC explained their stance on the findings,

In response to the atypical findings, VADA immediately ordered additional anti-doping tests on Champion Beterbiev. To that end, VADA caused samples to be collected from Champion Beterbiev on December 15, 2023 (urine), December 21, 2023 (blood and urine), and then again on January 3, 2024 (blood). All of those samples yielded absolutely negative results. Matchroom, Top Rank, the Quebec Commission, all sanctioning bodies involved (WBC, IBF, and WBO), and the Association of Boxing Commissions (ABC) received notifications of all the results of anti-doping test Champion Beterbiev has taken, and therefore of all follow up procedures.

Beterbiev was a 4–1 favorite to win. He weighed in at the 175 pound limit and Smith weighed 174.6 pounds.

In front of 10,031 fans in attendance, Beterbiev won the fight by a seventh-round technical knockout. He was ahead 58–56, 58–56, and 59–55 on the scorecards at the time of the stoppage. Beterbiev dominated throughout the fight. In round 5, Smith was hit with hard jabs. In the sixth, Beterbiev continued to land on Smith, which caused swelling around both eyes. The end came in round 7, after Beterbiev dropped Smith following several punches. This was the first time Smith had been dropped as a professional. He got up at the 8-count and continued, only to be hit with more shots to the chin, dropping him a second time. Buddy McGirt then stepped up on the apron to halt the contest. Compubox showed Beterbiev was more busy and accurate, landing 182 of 471 punches thrown (38.6%), whilst Smith landed 59 of his 366 thrown (16.1%). Beterbiev landed 95 jabs. According to Nielsen Media Research, the fight averaged 691,000 viewers and peaked at 793,000 viewers.

After the fight, Smith said, "No excuses. The better man won tonight. My performance wasn’t the best, but he’s a good champion. He turns up. He’s done what he’s meant to do." Smith also said he didn't feel Beterbiev's power until he was stopped.

==== Smith vs. Galvan ====
Smith made a winning return to the ring following his loss to Beterbiev, stopping Carlos Galvan in the fifth round at Resorts World Arena in Birmingham on 30 November 2024.

==== Smith vs. Buatsi ====
Smith inflicted the first professional defeat on fellow Briton Joshua Buatsi at The Venue Riyadh Season in Riyadh, Saudi Arabia, on 22 February 2025, winning by unanimous decision and claiming the WBO interim light-heavyweight title.

In June 2025, Eddie Hearn revealed he had received an offer from PBC for David Benavidez (30–0, 24 KOs) to defend his WBC light heavyweight title against Smith. The aim was for the fight to take place in October, most likely in Las Vegas. Sampson Lewkowicz, promoter of Benavidez, said the fight could end up taking place in Liverpool, England, with another possibility being Dallas, Texas. Lewkowicz also mentioned Anthony Yarde as a potential opponent in the UK. In July, Turki Alalshikh posted on X, announcing Benavidez would be defending his world title against Yarde (27–3, 24 KOs) in November 2025.

==== Inactivity ====
On 21 July, the WBO ordered Smith to defend his interim title against Cuban boxer David Morrell (12–1, 9 KOs), giving them 30 days to negotiate a fight. Morrell was coming off a controversial split decision win over Imam Khataev, a fight where Morrell was knocked down. Hearn planned on putting on the fight in November 2025. An update was provided in October, indicating that Hearn had discussions with Alalshikh about organising the fight on a Saudi card in early 2026. On 13 November, WBO president Gustavo Olivieri asked both sides to wrap up their terms within 24 hours, or purse bids would be put into motion. Purse bids were set for 25 November. After some back and forth, terms were finally agreed on 4 December. The fight was likely to land on an Anthony Joshua undercard in Riyadh in February 2026; however, in December, Joshua was involved in a car accident in Nigeria. This cancelled any plans for the event to go ahead, as no other fights were announced. Hearn was working closely with Luis DeCubas, Morrell's promoter, to explore alternative dates and venues.

On 17 February 2026, it was announced that Smith would defend his interim WBO light heavyweight title against Morrell, headlining at the M&S Bank Arena in Liverpool, on 18 April 2026, exclusively on DAZN. Two weeks before the event, the fight was called off after Smith suffered an undisclosed injury during his training camp. Frank Smith of Matchroom Boxing stated that discussions would be held with WBO to reschedule the fight. Morrell instead fought on 9 May, against Zak Chelli, where he entered a favourite, at the Co-op Live Arena in Manchester. He lost the fight by TKO in the tenth round, in what was considered a huge upset.

On 6 June 2026, Eddie Hearn said that Matchroom Boxing and Queensberry Promotions had held discussions regarding a second team-based event following Queensberry's 5–0 victory in their first 5v5 card in 2024. The card was likely to take place later in the year. He also mentioned that a rematch between Smith and Joshua Buatsi was being explored as one of the leading fights and potential main event. There was a chance the fight might be fought for the WBO title if Smith was to be elevated from his interim status.

==== Smith vs. Bivol ====
Dmitry Bivol (25–1, 12 KOs) underwent surgery on 4 July to repair an injured left elbow. After completing his recovery, he was expected to defend his titles against mandatory challenger Smith, with the WBO set to formally order the bout. There were talks that Bivol could vacate the title, which would elevate Smith to full championship status. Bivol was considering this, in order to pursue a trilogy bout with Beterbiev or a potential fight with David Benavidez. On 7 July 2026, the WBO officially ordered Bivol to defend his WBO title against Smith, giving both teams 20 days to agree terms. On 27 August, Olivieri confirmed that the parties had reached an agreement, with the fight reportedly scheduled for December 2026 in Russia. On 12 October, it was announced that Bivol would defend his unified IBF, WBO, WBC and Ring light heavyweight titles against Smith on 12 December in Yekaterinburg, Russia. Both fighters were returning from extended periods of inactivity caused in part by injuries.

== Professional boxing record ==
33 fights	31 wins	2 losses
By knockout	22	1
By decision	9	1

No.	Result	Record	Opponent	Type	Round, time	Date	Location	Notes
33	Win	31–2	Joshua Buatsi	UD	12	22 Feb 2025	The Venue Riyadh Season, Riyadh, Saudi Arabia	Won WBO interim light-heavyweight title
32	Win	30–2	Carlos Galvan	TKO	5 (8), 1:19	30 Nov 2024	Resorts World Arena, Birmingham, England	
31	Loss	29–2	Artur Beterbiev	TKO	7 (12), 2:00	13 Jan 2024	Videotron Centre, Quebec City, Canada	For WBC, IBF, and WBO light-heavyweight titles
30	Win	29–1	Mathieu Bauderlique	KO	4 (12), 1:53	20 Aug 2022	King Abdullah Sports City, Jeddah, Saudi Arabia	
29	Win	28–1	Lenin Castillo	KO	2 (10), 0:55	25 Sep 2021	Tottenham Hotspur Stadium, London, England	
28	Loss	27–1	Canelo Álvarez	UD	12	19 Dec 2020	Alamodome, San Antonio, Texas, US	Lost WBA (Super) and The Ring super-middleweight titles; For vacant WBC super-middleweight title
27	Win	27–0	John Ryder	UD	12	23 Nov 2019	M&S Bank Arena, Liverpool, England	Retained WBA (Super) and The Ring super-middleweight titles
26	Win	26–0	Hassan N'Dam N'Jikam	TKO	3 (12), 2:56	1 Jun 2019	Madison Square Garden, New York City, New York, US	Retained WBA (Super) and The Ring super-middleweight titles
25	Win	25–0	George Groves	KO	7 (12), 2:04	28 Sep 2018	King Abdullah Sports City, Jeddah, Saudi Arabia	Won WBA (Super) and vacant The Ring super middleweight titles; World Boxing Super Series: super-middleweight final
24	Win	24–0	Nieky Holzken	UD	12	24 Feb 2018	Arena Nürnberger Versicherung, Nuremberg, Germany	World Boxing Super Series: super-middleweight semi-final
23	Win	23–0	Erik Skoglund	UD	12	16 Sep 2017	Echo Arena, Liverpool, England	World Boxing Super Series: super-middleweight quarter-final
22	Win	22–0	Luke Blackledge	KO	10 (12), 2:34	10 Dec 2016	Manchester Arena, Manchester, England	Retained British super-middleweight title
21	Win	21–0	Norbert Nemesapati	RTD	6 (12), 3:00	10 Sep 2016	The O2 Arena, London, England	Retained WBC Silver super-middleweight title
20	Win	20–0	Cesar Hernan Reynoso	TKO	6 (8), 2:02	29 May 2016	Goodison Park, Liverpool, England	
19	Win	19–0	Hadillah Mohoumadi	TKO	1 (12), 2:00	2 Apr 2016	Echo Arena, Liverpool, England	Won European super-middleweight title
18	Win	18–0	Rocky Fielding	TKO	1 (12), 2:45	7 Nov 2015	Echo Arena, Liverpool, England	Retained WBC Silver super middleweight title; Won vacant British super-middleweight title
17	Win	17–0	Christopher Rebrassé	UD	12	26 Jun 2015	Echo Arena, Liverpool, England	Won vacant WBC Silver super-middleweight title
16	Win	16–0	Olegs Fedotovs	TKO	1 (6), 1:36	9 May 2015	National Indoor Arena, Birmingham, England	
15	Win	15–0	Nikola Sjekloća	UD	12	22 Nov 2014	Echo Arena, Liverpool, England	Retained WBC International super-middleweight title
14	Win	14–0	Rafael Sosa Pintos	TKO	3 (8), 2:20	4 Oct 2014	First Direct Arena, Leeds, England	
13	Win	13–0	Abraham Hernandez	KO	1 (6), 2:59	16 Aug 2014	StubHub Center, Carson, California, US	
12	Win	12–0	Vladine Biosse	UD	10	12 Jul 2014	Echo Arena, Liverpool, England	Retained WBC International super-middleweight title
11	Win	11–0	Tobias Webb	KO	2 (10), 2:50	17 May 2014	Motorpoint Arena, Cardiff, Wales	Retained WBC International super-middleweight title
10	Win	10–0	François Bastient	TKO	3 (6), 1:10	19 Apr 2014	Phones 4u Arena, Manchester, England	
9	Win	9–0	Ruben Eduardo Acosta	KO	6 (10), 1:20	26 Oct 2013	Motorpoint Arena, Sheffield, England	Won vacant WBC International super-middleweight title
8	Win	8–0	Patrick Mendy	TKO	1 (10), 2:53	21 Sep 2013	Liverpool Olympia, Liverpool, England	Won vacant English super-middleweight title
7	Win	7–0	Krill Psonko	TKO	1 (6), 2:30	7 Sep 2013	Exhibition and Conference Centre, Glasgow, Scotland	
6	Win	6–0	Ryan Moore	TKO	1 (4), 1:25	25 May 2013	The O2 Arena, London, England	
5	Win	5–0	Ruslans Pojonisevs	KO	1 (6), 3:00	20 Apr 2013	Winter Gardens, Blackpool, England	
4	Win	4–0	Iain Jackson	RTD	1 (6), 3:00	30 Mar 2013	Echo Arena, Liverpool, England	
3	Win	3–0	Tommy Tolan	TKO	1 (4), 2:31	9 Feb 2013	Odyssey Arena, Belfast, Northern Ireland	
2	Win	2–0	James Tucker	PTS	4	8 Dec 2012	London Olympia, London, England	
1	Win	1–0	Dan Blackwell	PTS	4	17 Nov 2012	Capital FM Arena, Nottingham, England	

== Titles in boxing ==
=== Major world titles ===
- WBA (Super) super-middleweight champion (168 lbs)

=== The Ring magazine titles ===
- The Ring super-middleweight champion (168 lbs)

=== Interim/Silver world titles (Note: In 2010, the WBC created the "Silver Championship", intended as a replacement for interim titles.) ===
- WBC Silver super-middleweight champion (168 lbs)
- WBO interim light-heavyweight champion (175 lbs)

=== Regional/International titles ===
- WBC International super-middleweight champion (168 lbs)
- European super-middleweight champion (168 lbs)
- English super-middleweight champion (168 lbs)
- British super-middleweight champion (168 lbs)

=== Honorary titles ===
- WBA Man of Triumph Gold champion
- WBC Diamond super-middleweight champion

== Notes and references ==
=== References ===
Sporting positions
Regional boxing titles
Vacant Title last held by Rocky Fielding	English super-middleweight champion 21 September 2013 – March 2015; Vacated	Vacant Title next held by Jahmaine Smyle
Vacant Title last held by Giovanni De Carolis	WBC International super-middleweight champion 26 October 2013 – 26 June 2015; Won Silver title	Vacant Title next held by Rocky Fielding
Vacant Title last held by George Groves	WBC Silver super-middleweight champion 26 June 2015 – May 2018; Vacated	Vacant Title next held by Azizbek Abdugofurov
Vacant Title last held by Paul Smith	British super-middleweight champion 7 November 2015 – April 2017; Vacated	Vacant Title next held by Rocky Fielding
Preceded by Hadillah Mohoumadi	European super-middleweight champion 2 April 2016 – May 2017; Vacated	Vacant Title next held by Hadillah Mohoumadi
World boxing titles
Preceded by George Groves	WBA super-middleweight champion Super title 28 September 2018 – 19 December 2020	Succeeded by Canelo Álvarez
Vacant Title last held by Andre Ward	The Ring super-middleweight champion 28 September 2018 – 19 December 2020	Succeeded by Canelo Álvarez
Preceded by Joshua Buatsi	WBO light-heavyweight champion Interim title 22 February 2025 – present	Incumbent
