= Canelo Álvarez vs. Rocky Fielding =

2018 boxing match

- Date: December 15, 2018
- Venue: Madison Square Garden, New York City, New York, U.S.
- Title(s) on the line: WBA (Regular) Super Middleweight title

Tale of the tape
Boxer	Saúl Álvarez	Rocky Fielding
Nickname	"Canelo"	"Rocky from Stocky"
Hometown	Guadalajara, Jalisco, Mexico	Liverpool, Merseyside, UK
Pre-fight record	50–1–2 (34 KO)	27–1 (15 KO)
Age	28 years, 4 months	31 years, 4 months
Height	5 ft 8 in (173 cm)	6 ft 1 in (185 cm)
Weight	167 3/4 lb (76 kg)	167 1/2 lb (76 kg)
Style	Orthodox	Orthodox
Recognition	WBA (Super), WBC, The Ring and TBRB; Middleweight Champion; The Ring No. 3 ranked pound-for-pound fighter 2-division world champion	WBA (Regular); Super Middleweight Champion; The Ring/TBRB; No. 9 Ranked Super Middleweight

Result
- Álvarez wins via 3rd-round TKO

Canelo Álvarez vs. Rocky Fielding was a professional boxing match contested on December 15, 2018, for the WBA (Regular) super middleweight title.

== Background ==
On 5 October, Canelo Álvarez wrote on social media that he would next face WBA (Regular) super middleweight title holder, Rocky Fielding on 15 December at Madison Square Garden. 12 days later, DAZN announced that it had signed a five-year, $365 million deal with Álvarez, under which his next eleven fights would be broadcast in the U.S. by the subscription sports streaming service. The deal would begin with Álvarez vs. Fielding and replace his expired contract with HBO (which had also announced its discontinuation of boxing telecasts).

Fielding had won the Regular title by upsetting Tyron Zeuge in Offenburg the previous July by fifth round TKO.

== The fight ==
Álvarez would dominate the bout, with the taller Fielding not attempting to establish the range but instead he was dropped in each of the first two rounds with left hands to the body. Fielding was able to land some combinations of his own but they lacked the power required to trouble Canelo. A right to the jaw again dropped Fielding in round three, prompting the referee to warn the brit that "one more" would end the bout. Later in the round another left to the body dropped Fielding for the fourth time at which point referee Ricky Gonzalez stopped the bout.

According to CompuBox, Álvarez would land 73 of 141 (52%) of his punches against just 37 of 183 (20%) of Fielding's

== Aftermath ==
Speaking after the bout said Alvarez "Fortunately for me he came to attack, that was the error he made and I did my thing in there." Fielding would admit he made a tactical error in trading with Canelo saying that "I stood there too long, thought I could mix it with him and shouldn't have, with my height, I should have kept the fight long, at distance. The better man won."

== Undercard ==
Confirmed bouts:

Winner	Loser	Weight division/title belt(s) disputed	Result
(United States) Tevin Farmer	(United States) Francisco Fonseca	IBF World Super featherweight title	Unanimous decision
(United States) Sadam Ali	(United States) Mauricio Herrera	Welterweight (10 rounds)	Unanimous decision
(United States) Ryan Garcia	(Dominican Republic) Braulio Rodriguez	Lightweight (10 rounds)	5th round KO
(Republic of Ireland) Katie Taylor	(Finland) Eva Wahlström	IBF World Lightweight title	Unanimous decision
(United States) Lamont Roach Jr.	(Puerto Rico) Alberto Mercado	WBO International Super Featherweight title	Unanimous decision
(Canada) Yves Ulysse Jr.	(United States) Maximilliano Becerra	Super lightweight (8 rounds)	Unanimous decision
Preliminary bouts
(Australia) Bilal Akkawy	(Mexico) Victor Fonseca Calderas	Super middleweight (8 rounds)	7th round TKO

== Broadcasting ==
Country	Broadcaster
Latin America	Canal Space
United Kingdom	Sky Sports
United States	DAZN

Preceded by vs. Gennady Golovkin II	Canelo Álvarez's bouts 15 December 2018	Succeeded by vs. Daniel Jacobs
Preceded by vs. Tyron Zeuge	Rocky Fielding's bouts 15 December 2018	Succeeded by vs. Abdallah Paziwapazi
