= Avni Yıldırım =

Turkish boxer (born 1991)

Personal information
- Nickname: Mr. Robot
- Nationality: Turkish
- Born: 5 August 1991 (age 35) Sivas, Turkey
- Height: 5 ft 11 1/2 in (182 cm)
- Weight: Middleweight; Super-middleweight; Light-heavyweight

Boxing career
- Reach: 70 in (178 cm)
- Stance: Orthodox stance

Boxing record
- Total fights: 34
- Wins: 29
- Win by KO: 18
- Losses: 5
Medal record
Men's amateur boxing
Representing Turkey
Mediterranean Games
Bronze medal – third place	2013 Mersin	Light-heavyweight

Avni Yıldırım (born 5 August 1991) is a Turkish professional boxer. He challenged for the WBC super-middleweight title in 2019, and the WBA (Super), WBC, and Ring magazine super-middleweight titles in 2021.

== Professional career ==
=== Yıldırım vs. Eubank Jr. ===
Yıldırım compiled a perfect record of 16-0 before challenging Chris Eubank Jr. for his IBO super-middleweight title on 7 October 2017 in Stuttgart, Germany as part of the World Boxing Super Series. Eubank Jr. was ranked #4 by the WBC and the IBF and #8 by the WBA. He was knocked down by Eubank Jr. in the first round, before being knocked out two rounds later.

=== Yıldırım vs. Mock ===
Yıldırım beat Lolenga Mock by majority decision in their 12 round contest on 15 September 2018. Mock was ranked #15 by the WBC at super middleweight at the time.

=== Yıldırım vs. Dirrell ===
Yıldırım rebounded from his first professional career loss with a run of five consecutive victories to improve to 21-1, before challenging Anthony Dirrell for the vacant WBC super-middleweight title on 23 February 2019 in Minneapolis, Minnesota. Dirrell was ranked #1 by the WBC at the time. After Dirrell was cut from an accidental head clash, the fight was stopped in the tenth round, with Dirrell emerging as the victor by split technical decision (96-94, 96-94, 92-98). Yıldırım was not happy with the stoppage, stating “I was upset. I wanted to keep going and finish the fight as a champion.” Yıldırım's promoter, Ahmet Oener, flew to Mexico City to meet with WBC president Mauricio Sulaiman to make their case for an immediate rematch. The WBC ultimately decided to resolve the matter by ordering a title fight between Dirrell and David Benavidez with the winner being mandated to face Yıldırım. However, Yıldırım was sidetracked by injury and the COVID-19 pandemic while maintaining his mandatory position.

=== Yıldırım vs. Álvarez ===
Following a layoff of over two years, Yıldırım returned to the ring on 27 February 2021 at Hard Rock Stadium, Miami to face highly-regarded unified super-middleweight champion Canelo Álvarez, again challenging for the WBC super-middleweight title which now belonged to Álvarez, in addition to Álvarez's WBA (Super) and The Ring titles. A huge underdog, Yıldırım was unable to overcome the odds as his opponent proved too much for him. Yıldırım retired on his stool at the end of the third round, having landed only 11 punches total in the fight, compared to Álvarez's 67.

=== Yıldırım vs. Cullen ===
Yıldırım faced Jack Cullen as part of Fight Camp in Brentwood, England on 31 July 2021. He lost a wide unanimous decision, with scores of 100-90, 98-92, 97-93 all in favor of Cullen.

== Professional boxing record ==
34 fights	29 wins	5 losses
By knockout	18	3
By decision	11	2

No.	Result	Record	Opponent	Type	Round, time	Date	Location	Notes
34	Win	29–5	Konstantin Ponomarev	TKO	3 (8), 1:59	6 Jun 2026	The Gallery Meydan, Dubai, United Arab Emirates	
33	Win	28–5	Richard Egowa	KO	2 (8), 2:58	23 Nov 2025	Olympic Park “Feti Borova”, Tirana, Albania	
32	Win	27–5	Jhon Caicedo	KO	3 (10), 0:53	26 Jun 2025	Sinan Erdem Sport Complex, Istanbul, Turkey	Won vacant WBC International light-heavyweight title
31	Win	26–5	Sergei Gorokhov	TKO	3 (8), 0:42	9 Nov 2024	The Agenda, Dubai, United Arab Emirates	
30	Win	25–5	Ramal Amanov	RTD	4 (6), 3:00	6 Sep 2024	Freedom Event Hall, Kyiv, Ukraine	
29	Loss	24–5	Yusuf Kanguel	TKO	9 (10), 0:50	14 May 2022	BJK Akatlar Arena, Istanbul, Turkey	For vacant WBC-ABCO and Turkey super-middleweight titles
28	Win	24–4	Yusuf Kanguel	UD	10	20 Nov 2021	Universum Gym, Hamburg, Germany	
27	Win	23–4	Dominik Ameri	UD	8	25 Sep 2021	Universum Gym, Hamburg, Germany	
26	Win	22–4	Slavisa Simeunovic	KO	1 (8), 2:54	21 Aug 2021	Universum Gym, Hamburg, Germany	
25	Loss	21–4	Jack Cullen	UD	10	31 Jul 2021	Matchroom Headquarters, Brentwood, England	For vacant IBF International super-middleweight title
24	Loss	21–3	Canelo Álvarez	RTD	3 (12), 3:00	27 Feb 2021	Hard Rock Stadium, Miami Gardens, Florida, US	For WBA (Super), WBC, and The Ring super-middleweight titles
23	Loss	21–2	Anthony Dirrell	TD	10 (12), 1:55	23 Feb 2019	Minneapolis Armory, Minneapolis, Minnesota, US	For vacant WBC super-middleweight title; Split TD: Dirrell cut from accidental head clash
22	Win	21–1	Lolenga Mock	MD	12	15 Sep 2018	Friedrich-Ebert-Halle, Ludwigshafen, Germany	Retained WBC International super-middleweight title
21	Win	20–1	Jose Antonio Rodriguez	RTD	1 (10), 3:00	14 Jul 2018	Casa de los Clubes, Santo Domingo, Dominican Republic	
20	Win	19–1	Ryan Ford	UD	12	12 May 2018	Nobeo Studios, Cologne, Germany	Retained WBC International super-middleweight title
19	Win	18–1	Derek Edwards	UD	12	3 Mar 2018	Sartory Saale, Cologne, Germany	Retained WBC International super-middleweight title
18	Win	17–1	Attila Korda	TKO	1 (8), 1:36	16 Dec 2017	Messehalle, Straubing, Germany	
17	Loss	16–1	Chris Eubank Jr.	KO	3 (12), 1:58	7 Oct 2017	Hanns-Martin-Schleyer-Halle, Stuttgart, Germany	For IBO super-middleweight title; World Boxing Super Series: super-middleweight quarter-final
16	Win	16–0	Marco Antonio Peribán	UD	12	13 May 2017	Foro Aga de Palcco, Zapopan, Mexico	Won vacant WBC International super-middleweight title
15	Win	15–0	Aliaksandr Sushchyts	TKO	1 (12), 1:36	18 Feb 2017	Teatro Principe, Milan, Italy	Retained WBC Silver International super-middleweight title
14	Win	14–0	Schiller Hyppolite	TKO	3 (10), 2:44	5 Nov 2016	Ballhaus Forum, Munich, Germany	Won vacant WBC Silver International super-middleweight title
13	Win	13–0	Aaron Pryor Jr	UD	10	27 Aug 2016	Huxleys, Berlin, Germany	
12	Win	12–0	Timur Nikarkhoev	TKO	5 (8), 2:05	23 Jul 2016	Iron Gym, Berlin, Germany	
11	Win	11–0	Zoltan Sera	TKO	2 (8), 0:45	23 May 2016	Petko's Gym, Dachau, Germany	
10	Win	10–0	Jackson Junior	KO	2 (12), 2:27	6 May 2016	Huxleys, Berlin, Germany	Retained WBC Silver International light-heavyweight title
9	Win	9–0	Walter Gabriel Sequeira	UD	12	26 Feb 2016	Stadthalle, Offenbach am Main, Germany	Retained WBC Silver International light-heavyweight title
8	Win	8–0	Janne Forsman	KO	1 (12), 1:07	18 Dec 2015	Sport Hall, Ratingen, Germany	Retained WBC Silver International light-heavyweight title
7	Win	7–0	Bernard Donfack	UD	12	11 Oct 2015	Sport Halle, Herne, Germany	Retained WBC Silver International light-heavyweight title
6	Win	6–0	Glen Johnson	UD	10	15 Aug 2015	Mana Studios, Miami, Florida, US	Won vacant WBC Silver International light-heavyweight title
5	Win	5–0	Steve Kroekel	TKO	1 (8), 0:30	16 Jun 2015	Arena Boxgym, Düsseldorf, Germany	
4	Win	4–0	Giorgi Aduashvili	TKO	2 (4), 2:59	30 Apr 2015	Arena Boxgym, Düsseldorf, Germany	
3	Win	3–0	Giorgi Beroshvili	TKO	3 (8), 2:29	27 Feb 2015	Gloria Sports Arena, Antalya, Turkey	
2	Win	2–0	Aleksandar Jankovic	TKO	1 (6), 1:58	14 Feb 2015	Adnan Menderes Spor Salonu, Adana, Turkey	
1	Win	1–0	Davit Ribakoni	PTS	4	22 Mar 2014	Atatürk Spor Salonu, Tekirdağ, Turkey	

Sporting positions
Regional boxing titles
Vacant Title last held by Zac Dunn	WBC International Silver super-middleweight champion November 5, 2016 – May 13, 2017; Won International title	Vacant Title next held by Sakio Bika
Vacant Title last held by Rocky Fielding	WBC International super-middleweight champion May 13, 2017 – November 2, 2018; Vacated	Vacant Title next held by Giovanni De Carolis
