= Rob Brant =

American boxer (born 1990)

Personal information
- Nickname: Bravo
- Nationality: American
- Born: October 2, 1990 (age 36) Saint Paul, Minnesota, U.S.
- Height: 6 ft 0 1/2 in (184 cm)
- Weight: Light middleweight; Middleweight; Super middleweight

Boxing career
- Reach: 70 1/2 in (179 cm)
- Stance: Orthodox

Boxing record
- Total fights: 29
- Wins: 26
- Win by KO: 18
- Losses: 3

Robert Brant (born October 2, 1990) is an American professional boxer who held the WBA (Regular) middleweight title from 2018 to 2019.

== Amateur career ==
Brant was a member of the US National boxing team. He began boxing as an amateur in 2007 and by 2009, remarkably, had already won a national championship. In his amateur career, Brant tallied the following notable finishes:

- 2007 Ringside Championships - Champion
- 2008 Platinum Gloves (Orlando) - Runner-Up
- 2008 Under 19 National Championships - Champion
- 2009 Upper Midwest Golden Gloves - Champion
- 2009 U.S. National Championships - Champion
- 2010 Upper Midwest Golden Gloves - Champion
- 2010 National Golden Gloves - Champion

== Professional career ==
=== Early career ===
Brant turned professional in June 2012, beginning his career with a second-round technical knockout (TKO) win over journeyman Cheyenne Ziegler. By October 2015, Brant's record was 17-0 when he first headlined a nationally televised card, defeating Louis Rose of Lynwood, California, then 13–2–1, by majority decision in a closely contested ten-round bout. On January 22, 2016, Brant fought in the main event of a Showtime televised card, defeating 15-3-1 Decarlo Perez by knockout in round four. The result was widely publicized, with commentators praising Brant as "outstanding," "a skilled boxer," and displaying "crushing power." Dan Rafael of ESPN praised Brant for his "titanic right hand...that annihilated Perez." Brant's knockout of Perez was also featured on that evening's edition of SportsCenter's Top 10, and was later listed as number six on ESPN's 2016 Knockouts of the Year. The win gave Brant a 19–0 record with 12 wins by knockout. On April 15, 2016, Brant improved to 20–0 with a knockout of Delray Raines in a fight that lasted just 55 seconds. Brant earned another early-round knockout on August 5, making quick work of Chris Fitzpatrick. ESPN named Brant one of its Top 20 Rising Stars of professional boxing in an article published on December 29, 2016.

On July 6, it was announced that Brant would move from middleweight to super middleweight to take part in the World Boxing Super Series, Brant being the only American boxer to take part in the tournament. Given the opportunity to compete in the tournament Brant stated he would "be proud to have the opportunity to represent the United States".

On 27 October 2017, Brant faced former world champion Juergen Braehmer as a part of the WBSS super middleweight quarterfinal. Braehmer boxed well and kept a steady pace throughout the fight, landing the better punches and making Brant miss. Brant didn't do much in the final round to try and change the outcome of the fight. The judges saw it as a unanimous decision win in favor of Braehmer, 119–109, 118-110 and 116–112. In his following fight, Brant bounced back with a first-round knockout win against Colby Courter.

=== WBA (Regular) middleweight champion ===
==== Brant vs. Murata ====
After his comeback win, Brant challenged Ryota Murata for the WBA (Regular) middleweight title at Park Theater in Las Vegas, Nevada on October 20, 2018. Brant, at that time ranked #3 by the WBA and #11 by the IBF, was considered the underdog going into the fight. Brant proved the experts wrong by outboxing and outworking Murata on the way to a unanimous decision win, 118–110, 119-109 and 119–109.

==== Brant vs. Baysangurov ====
His first title defense came against Khasan Baysangurov on February 15, 2019. Brant managed to trop Baysangurov once, en route to an eleventh-round TKO victory, to retain his WBA (Regular) middleweight title.

==== Brant vs. Murata II ====
On July 12, 2019, Brant had his second title defense against Ryota Murata in a much anticipated rematch, this time in Murata's home country, at the Edition Arena in Osaka, Japan. The rematch went completely differently from the first fight, this time Murata being the dominant fighter, dropping and stopping Brant in the second round to reclaim his WBA (Regular) belt.

=== Career from 2020 ===
After a layoff of more than a year, Brant returned to the ring on August 22, 2020, where he was victorious against Vitalii Kopylenko via fifth-round corner retirement.

Brant faced undefeated Janibek Alimkhanuly as the co-featured bout to Vasiliy Lomachenko vs. Masayoshi Nakatani on June 26, 2021, in Paradise, Nevada. He took a knee in the sixth round en route to an eighth-round corner retirement defeat.

== Professional boxing record ==
29 fights	26 wins	3 losses
By knockout	18	2
By decision	8	1

No.	Result	Record	Opponent	Type	Round, time	Date	Location	Notes
29	Loss	26–3	(Kazakhstan) Janibek Alimkhanuly	RTD	8 (10), 3:00	Jun 26, 2021	(United States) Virgin Hotels Las Vegas, Paradise, Nevada, U.S.	
28	Win	26–2	(Ukraine) Vitalii Kopylenko	RTD	5 (10), 3:00	Aug 22, 2020	(United States) MGM Grand Conference Center, Paradise, Nevada, U.S.	
27	Loss	25–2	(Japan) Ryōta Murata	TKO	2 (12), 2:34	Jul 12, 2019	Edion Arena, Osaka, Japan	Lost WBA (Regular) middleweight title
26	Win	25–1	(Ukraine) Khasan Baysangurov	TKO	11 (12), 1:42	Feb 15, 2019	(United States) Grand Casino, Hinckley, Minnesota, U.S.	Retained WBA (Regular) middleweight title
25	Win	24–1	(Japan) Ryōta Murata	UD	12	Oct 20, 2018	(United States) Park Theater, Las Vegas, Nevada, U.S.	Won WBA (Regular) middleweight title
24	Win	23–1	(United States) Colby Courter	KO	1 (8)	Mar 18, 2018	(United States) Grand Casino, Hinckley, Minnesota, U.S.	
23	Loss	22–1	(Germany) Jürgen Brähmer	UD	12	Oct 27, 2017	Sport- und Kongresshalle, Schwerin, Germany	World Boxing Super Series: super middleweight quarter-final
22	Win	22–0	(United States) Alexis Hloros	TKO	1 (10), 2:37	Jan 20, 2017	(United States) Grand Casino, Hinckley, Minnesota, U.S.	Retained WBA-NABA middleweight title
21	Win	21–0	(United States) Chris Fitzpatrick	KO	3 (10), 1:18	Aug 5, 2016	(United States) Pechanga Resort & Casino, Temecula, California, U.S.	
20	Win	20–0	(United States) Delray Raines	KO	1 (10), 0:55	Apr 15, 2016	(United States) Grand Casino, Hinckley, Minnesota, U.S.	Retained WBA-NABA middleweight title
19	Win	19–0	(United States) Decarlo Perez	KO	4 (10), 0:39	Jan 22, 2016	(United States) Casino Del Sol, Tucson, Arizona, U.S.	Won vacant WBA-NABA middleweight title
18	Win	18–0	(United States) Louis Rose	MD	10	Oct 23, 2015	(United States) Celebrity Theater, Phoenix, Arizona, U.S.	Won vacant WBC Continental Americas middleweight title
17	Win	17–0	(United States) Lekan Byfield	KO	3 (8)	Aug 28, 2015	(United States) Grand Casino, Hinckley, Minnesota, U.S.	
16	Win	16–0	(Mexico) Ernesto Berrospe	TKO	3 (6), 0:33	Jul 17, 2015	(United States) Sands Event Center, Bethlehem, Pennsylvania, U.S.	
15	Win	15–0	(Colombia) Dionisio Miranda	KO	2 (8), 2:40	Apr 17, 2015	(United States) Grand Casino, Hinckley, Minnesota, U.S.	
14	Win	14–0	(United States) Ryan Davis	TKO	1 (8)	Feb 6, 2015	(United States) Grand Casino, Hinckley, Minnesota, U.S.	
13	Win	13–0	(United States) Eric Draper	TKO	1 (8), 1:30	Nov 21, 2014	(United States) Grand Casino, Hinckley, Minnesota, U.S.	
12	Win	12–0	(United States) Marcus Upshaw	UD	8	Aug 22, 2014	(United States) Grand Casino, Hinckley, Minnesota, U.S.	
11	Win	11–0	(United States) Mickey Scarborough	TKO	1 (6), 2:17	Jun 13, 2014	(United States) Muse Event Center, Minneapolis, Minnesota, U.S.	
10	Win	10–0	(United States) Demetrius Walker	UD	6	Mar 28, 2014	(United States) Grand Casino, Hinckley, Minnesota, U.S.	
9	Win	9–0	(United States) Tyler Hultin	TKO	2 (6), 1:41	Jan 24, 2014	(United States) Grand Casino, Hinckley, Minnesota, U.S.	
8	Win	8–0	(United States) Damien Hill	TKO	3 (5), 1:08	Aug 16, 2013	(United States) Grand Casino, Hinckley, Minnesota, U.S.	
7	Win	7–0	(United States) Eric Marriott	UD	6	Apr 13, 2013	(United States) Wessman Arena, Superior, Wisconsin, U.S.	
6	Win	6–0	(United States) Keith Collins	UD	6	Feb 9, 2013	(United States) Crown Plaza Hotel, Saint Paul, Minnesota, U.S.	
5	Win	5–0	(United States) Romon Barber	UD	6	Jan 5, 2013	(United States) Hyatt Regency Hotel, Minneapolis, Minnesota, U.S.	
4	Win	4–0	(United States) Ryan Soft	KO	1 (4), 2:53	Oct 27, 2012	(United States) Canterbury Park, Shakopee, Minnesota, U.S.	
3	Win	3–0	(United States) Eli Smith	TKO	1 (4), 1:22	Sep 15, 2012	(United States) Wessman Arena, Superior, Wisconsin, U.S.	
2	Win	2–0	(United States) Brian Geraghty	UD	4	Aug 25, 2012	(United States) Crown Plaza Hotel, Saint Paul, Minnesota, U.S.	
1	Win	1–0	(United States) Cheyenne Ziegler	KO	2 (4), 0:53	Jun 16, 2012	(United States) Hyatt Regency Hotel, Minneapolis, Minnesota, U.S.	

== See also ==
- List of middleweight boxing champions

Sporting positions
Amateur boxing titles
Previous: Dorian Anthony	U.S. light heavyweight champion 2009	Next: Jeffrey Spencer
Previous: Dorian Anthony	Golden Gloves light heavyweight champion 2010	Next: Caleb Plant
World boxing titles
Preceded by Ryōta Murata	WBA middleweight champion Regular Title; October 20, 2018 – July 12, 2019	Next: Ryōta Murata
