= 2017–18 World Boxing Super Series – super middleweight division =

Boxing competition

The 2017–18 World Boxing Super Series – super middleweight division was a World Boxing Super Series professional boxing tournament taking place between September 2017 and September 2018 in several countries. The Super Series features eight top-rated super middleweight boxers in a single-elimination tournament. Its winner holds the WBA's world title, The Ring magazine title, as well as the Muhammad Ali trophy. The tournament was organized by Comosa AG. A cruiserweight tournament was held concurrently, with prize money for both competitions totaling US$50 million.

== Participants ==
Rating^{1}	Boxer	Record^{2}	Stance	Height	Age^{2}	World titles^{2}
10^{3}	Jürgen Brähmer (GER)	48–3–0	Southpaw	1.81 m (5 ft 11 1/2 in)	October 5, 1978 (aged 38)	
—N/a	Robert Brant (USA)	22–0–0	Orthodox	1.82 m (5 ft 11 1/2 in)	October 2, 1990 (aged 26)	
—N/a	Jamie Cox (GBR)	24–0–0	Southpaw	1.80 m (5 ft 11 in)	August 24, 1986 (aged 31)	
6	Chris Eubank Jr. (GBR)	25–1–0	Orthodox	1.80 m (5 ft 11 in)	September 18, 1989 (aged 27)	IBO World Champion
3	George Groves (GBR)	26–3–0	Orthodox	1.82 m (5 ft 11 1/2 in)	March 26, 1988 (aged 29)	WBA (Super) World Champion
—N/a	Erik Skoglund (SWE)	26–0–0	Orthodox	1.86 m (6 ft 1 in)	May 24, 1991 (aged 26)	
7	Callum Smith (GBR)	22–0–0	Orthodox	1.91 m (6 ft 3 in)	April 23, 1990 (aged 27)	
—N/a	Avni Yıldırım (TUR)	16–0–0	Orthodox	1.80 m (5 ft 11 in)	August 5, 1991 (aged 26)	

^1 Transnational Boxing Rankings Board rankings on 12 September 2017, the last archived rankings before the start of the tournament.
^2 Age, records, and titles listed as of the start of the tournament.
^3 Ranked as light heavyweight.

- The final participant was decided by the winner of the Chris Eubank Jr. vs. Arthur Abraham fight. The bout occurred after the draft, with Eubank Jr. winning by unanimous decision.
- Patrick Nielsen and Vincent Feigenbutz are tournament reserves.

== Bracket ==
The format of the tournament required 4 seeded fighters to each choose their opponent from the 4 remaining unseeded fighters in a draft. The seeded fighters were determined by the organizers. The draft took place on July 8, 2017, in a gala hosted by actress Melanie Winiger in Monte Carlo. Chris Eubank chose the opponent for the winner of the Eubank Jr. vs Abraham bout.

Quarterfinals
George Groves (GBR)	KO 4
Jamie Cox (GBR)
Chris Eubank Jr. (GBR)	KO 3
Avni Yıldırım (TUR)
Callum Smith (GBR)	UD 12
Erik Skoglund (SWE)
Jürgen Brähmer (GER)	UD 12
Robert Brant (USA)

Semifinals
George Groves (GBR)	UD 12
Chris Eubank Jr. (GBR)
Callum Smith (GBR)	UD 12
Nieky Holzken* (NED)

Final
George Groves (GBR)
Callum Smith (GBR)	KO 7

_{*Jürgen Brähmer withdrew from the semi-final due to an illness and was replaced by Nieky Holzken.}

== Quarterfinals ==
=== Smith vs. Skoglund ===
- Date: 16 September 2017
- Venue: Echo Arena, Liverpool, United Kingdom
- Title(s) on the line: vacant WBC Diamond super middleweight title

Tale of the tape
Boxer	(United Kingdom) Callum Smith	(Sweden) Erik Skoglund
Nickname	Mundo	
Hometown	Liverpool, United Kingdom	Vårdinge, Sweden
Height	6 ft 3 in (1.91 m)	6 ft 1 in (1.85 m)
Weight	167 3/5 lb (76.0 kg)	167 7/10 lb (76.1 kg)

Result
- Smith defeats Skoglund via UD (116–112, 117–110, 117–111)

The first WBSS super middleweight match featured Callum Smith and Erik Skoglund, two young undefeated fighters, competing for a spot in the semifinals. At the official weigh-in, Smith hit the scales at 167 3/5 lbs, while Skoglund weighed-in around 167 3/5 lbs. The fight took place at Echo Arena in Liverpool and was announced by Jimmy Lennon Jr.

Smith beat Skoglund by unanimous decision to win one of four quarter-finals in front of his home crowd in Liverpool. The officials scored the fight 116–112, 117–110 and 117–111 all in favor of Smith. Now unbeaten in 23 bouts, Smith also claimed the WBC Diamond belt and became the first semi-finalist in the super middleweight World Boxing Super Series. Early on, the fight appeared to be a mismatch with Smith outclassing his opponent. However, Skoglund got himself into the fight in the middle rounds behind his consistent jab and head movement, giving Smith a bloody nose. Smith would make his own surge late in the fight, scoring a knockdown in round 11 and earning a clear unanimous decision.

=== Eubank vs. Yıldırım ===
- Date: 7 October 2017
- Venue: Hanns-Martin-Schleyer-Halle, Stuttgart, Germany
- Title(s) on the line: IBO super middleweight title

Tale of the tape
Boxer	(United Kingdom) Chris Eubank Jr.	(Turkey) Avni Yıldırım
Nickname	Next Gen	Mr Robot
Hometown	Brighton, United Kingdom	Sivas, Turkey
Height	5 ft 11 in (1.80 m)	5 ft 11 in (1.80 m)
Weight	167 7/10 lb (76.1 kg)	168 lb (76 kg)

Result
- Eubank Jr. defeats Yıldırım in the 3rd round via KO.

The super middleweight tournament resumed with Chris Eubank Jr. defending his IBO title against Avni Yıldırım. The fight was scheduled for October 6, at the Hanns-Martin-Schleyer-Halle in Stuttgart. In the lead-up to the fight, Ahmet Öner, Yıldırım's manager, got into a one-sided confrontation with Eubank's camp at a press conference. Öner called Eubank arrogant, threatened to knock someone out, and yelled "When you laugh, you son of a bitch, I fuck your wife in your bed!" at a man off-stage. At the weigh-in, Eubank tipped the scales at 167 7/10 lbs, while Yıldırım weighed in at 168 lbs.

On fight night, Eubank blasted Yıldırım, knocking him out in round 3. Eubank dropped his opponent with an uppercut in the first round, and finished him with a flurry of punches punctuated with a left hook in round 3.

The undercard featured a 10-round bout between former Olympians Stefan Härtel and Viktor Polyakov, which was controversially won by Härtel by majority decision. Upon being announced, the decision was booed by the audience at the Hanns-Martin-Schleyer-Halle. A brawl broke out in the stands moments before the main event.

=== Groves vs. Cox ===
- Date: 14 October 2017
- Venue: Wembley Arena, London, United Kingdom
- Title(s) on the line: WBA (Super) super middleweight title

Tale of the tape
Boxer	(United Kingdom) George Groves	(United Kingdom) Jamie Cox
Nickname	Saint George	
Hometown	London, United Kingdom	Swindon, United Kingdom
Height	5 ft 11 1/2 in (1.82 m)	5 ft 11 in (1.80 m)
Weight	167 1/10 lb (75.8 kg)	167 4/5 lb (76.1 kg)

Result
- Groves defeats Cox in the 4th round via KO.

George Groves sought to defend his WBA (Super) title against Jamie Cox at the Wembley Arena in the super middleweight competition's third quarter-final match. Both fighters made weight the day before the fight, with Groves coming in at 167 1/10 lb, while Cox weighed 167 4/5 lb.

After a tentative first round, Cox managed to corner Groves and hit him with accurate combination punching during round 2. Cox pressed Groves for the rest of the fight but Groves slowly started countering him with accurate timing. The fight ended in round 4, when Groves landed an uppercut to Cox's solar plexus which dropped the challenger. Cox was unable to recover as the referee counted him out. The win set up another domestic showdown for Groves, who is scheduled to face Eubank in the semifinals.

The undercard features tournament alternate Patrick Nielsen taking on local fighter John Ryder. Ryder blasted Nielsen, dropping him after two rounds. Nielsen was then hurt in round five by a right hook, which also dislodged his gumshield. Ryder then pounced on Nielsen, who wasn't defending himself and went down and out.

=== Brähmer vs. Brant ===
- Date: 27 October 2017
- Venue: Sport- und Kongresshalle, Schwerin, Germany

Tale of the tape
Boxer	(Germany) Jürgen Brähmer	(United States) Robert Brant
Nickname		Bravo
Hometown	Stralsund, Germany	Saint Paul, U.S.
Height	5 ft 11 in (1.80 m)	5 ft 11 in (1.80 m)
Weight	166 9/10 lb (75.7 kg)	166 lb (75 kg)

Result
- Brähmer defeats Brant via UD (119–109, 118–110, 116–112).

The final Super Series quarterfinal featured Jürgen Brähmer going against Robert Brant. Both competitors had recently fought at other weights, with Brähmer being a former light heavyweight world champion and Brant a fringe middleweight contender. Brähmer's last fight at super middleweight was a decision win over Mario Veit. At the weigh-in, Brähmer weighed 166 9/10 lb, while Brant tipped the scales at 166 lb even.

Brähmer got a dominant decision win, outboxing and outworking Brant over twelve rounds. Brant was unable to cope with Brähmer's refined technique, and he eventually seemed to tire out. Brant had only fought ten rounds once before and he had never fought twelve rounds. Brähmer's promoter and tournament organizer, Kalle Sauerland, called it Brähmer's best performance of all time.

Tournament reserve Vincent Feigenbutz picked up a win on the undercard, with a round 11 TKO over Gastón Vega.

== Semifinals ==
The semifinals took place on 17 and 24 February 2018.

=== Groves v Eubank ===
17 February 2018	George Groves (United Kingdom)	def. (UD 12)	(United Kingdom) Chris Eubank Jr.	Manchester Arena, Manchester, United Kingdom

=== Smith v Holzken ===
24 February 2018	Callum Smith (United Kingdom)	def. (UD 12)	(Netherlands) Nieky Holzken*	Arena Nürnberger Versicherung, Nürnberg, Germany

_{*Jürgen Brähmer withdrew from the semi-final due to an illness and was replaced by Nieky Holzken.}

== Final ==
The final was scheduled for 14 July 2018 in London, but later it was rescheduled for 28 September 2018 in Jeddah.

28 September 2018	Callum Smith (United Kingdom)	def. (KO 7)	(United Kingdom) George Groves	King Abdullah Sports City Indoor Stadium, Jeddah, Saudi Arabia

== See also ==
- 2017–18 World Boxing Super Series – cruiserweight division
