= Jamie Cox (boxer) =

British boxer (born 1986)

Personal information
- Nationality: British
- Born: James Simon Russan; 24 August 1986 (age 40) Swindon, Wiltshire, England
- Height: 5 ft 11 in (180 cm)
- Weight: Welterweight; Light-middleweight; Super-middleweight

Boxing career
- Stance: Southpaw

Boxing record
- Total fights: 27
- Wins: 25
- Win by KO: 14
- Losses: 2
Medal record
Men's amateur boxing
Representing England
English National Championships
| Silver medal – second place | 2005 London | Light-welterweight |
English National Championships
| Gold medal – first place | 2006 London | Light-welterweight |
Commonwealth Games
| Gold medal – first place | Melbourne 2006 | Light welterweight |

James Simon Russan (born 24 August 1986), best known as Jamie Cox, is a British former professional boxer who competed from 2007 to 2018. At regional level, he held the Commonwealth light-middleweight title from 2011 to 2012. As an amateur, he won a gold medal at the 2006 Commonwealth Games.

== Amateur career ==
Cox was a standout amateur who boxed for the Walcot ABA club in Swindon. Boxing at light welterweight, he won the 2005 ABA championships and won Gold for England in the 2006 Commonwealth Games. He claimed the gold medal in Melbourne by means of a walkover when his opponent Moses Kopo of Lesotho pulled out of the final. Former world champion Richie Woodhall commentating at the games said "He won't have fancied taking him on...he'll have known that Cox was favourite and he could really hurt him." Jamie chose to turn pro in February 2007 and signed for Frank Warren. It was also announced at the time that Woodhall would be his trainer.

== Professional career ==
In July 2007 Jamie made his professional debut at the O2 Arena with a unanimous 4 round points victory over journeyman Johnny Greaves and fought 3 more times that year to end 2007 with a record of 4-0. By October 2008 that record had stretched to 8-0, a milestone achieved whilst fighting in his home town of Swindon for the first time as a professional. Cox defeated the tough and experienced journeyman Billy Smith, stopping him in the 5th round in front of 1500 fans. Cox finished the year on a high, when on 6 December and fighting at the Excel Arena in London's Docklands he scored a first-round knockout over the normally durable journeyman Ernie Smith.

In February 2009 Cox boxed in Swindon for the second time, scoring a first-round knockout of Doncaster's Jason Rushton. After the fight Cox said that he would like to meet reigning British champion Kell Brook by the end of the year. On 24 April Cox defeated Mark Lloyd at the civic hall in Wolverhampton eventually stopping the Shropshire man in the 8th and final round despite being behind on the referee's points card at the time. Cox returned to Swindon on 25 July 2009 and boxed another 8 rounds defeating the Hungarian journeyman Janos Petrovics for a wide points win and finished off the year with a victory over Worksop based Iranian Manoocha Salari.

Cox's first fight of 2010 took place at the Wembley Arena on 13 February, scoring an 8-round victory of Mauritius's London based fighter Michael Frontin. The points win of 78-76 branded Cox's trainer Paddy Fitzpatrick to label the performance "undisciplined" and gave him a "5 out of 10" rating because he hadn't done "what I asked him to". Despite the performance however Cox was promised an eliminator for Brook's British title against fellow contender Mark Thompson, a man boasting a record of 23 wins with just the one defeat.

=== Return to the ring ===
Cox returned to the ring after almost 15 months with the decision to step up from welterweight to light middleweight and also taking on a new trainer, John Costello. Speaking of the move up in weight Costello said "he’s better conditioned at this weight, he’ll be stronger and faster. He won’t struggle to make the weight anymore so those problems are behind us now and he can eat properly." Speaking of his time out of the ring Costello, who runs the Chelmsley Wood Boxing Club, said of Cox "I think over the last 12 months Jamie has grown a lot mentally. He has made mistakes, admitted that and he’ll never get sucked into that kind of temptation again. He’s now with us in Birmingham and he’s comfortable here...He’s away from Swindon and all the distractions so that can only be good for his boxing career." On 21 May 2011 Cox celebrated victory at The O2 Arena in London beating Marcus Portman with a third round stoppage and claiming that he was ready to fight for the British title. On 9 September 2011 Cox headlined the annual Debra charity boxing event and won a highly controversial decision to pick up the Commonwealth light middleweight title beating Ghanaian Obodai Sai despite having two points deducted for low blows.

=== Second return ===
Cox returned to the ring in October 2016 with a clear points victory against Martin Fidel Rios. In 2017, it was announced that Cox had signed for Eddie Hearn at Matchroom Sport. His first fight with Hearn was a technical decision over Lewis Taylor after the fight was stopped in the 9th round due to an accidental head clash. The scorecards at the time read 87-84, 88-83, 88-83 all in favour of Cox.

In June, 2017, it was announced that Jamie Cox would join the super middleweight tournament of the World Boxing Super Series.

In his first bout, in the quarterfinals of the WBSS, Cox faced number one seed and WBA super middleweight champion George Groves. Cox was aggressive from the early rounds, trying to land on Groves and trap him against the ropes. Groves, however, didn't hold back and traded actively with his opponent. As the fight went on, Groves was the man who would land the better shots, eventually sending Cox to the floor with a body shot in the fourth round. Cox stayed on the mat in pain, not being able to beat the count.

On 5 May 2018, in a domestic super middleweight showdown, Cox faced compatriot John Ryder, then ranked #3 by the WBA and #12 by the WBC. The fight had a demanding start, with both fighters trading from close range. In the second round, Ryder would land a big shot to the temple, sending Cox to the mat. Cox almost managed to beat the count, but the referee waived the fight off, much to Cox's disapproval.

== Bare-knuckle boxing ==
Cox is scheduled to make his Bare Knuckle Fighting Championship debut against Pat Casey on 28 June 2025 at BKFC 77.

== Legal issues ==
On 2 March 2010, Cox was found guilty by a jury of assaulting a man outside a Swindon bar. Speaking of the event which happened during a night out, Cox told the jury "I feel terrible, I deserve everything I get from it." The incident had followed an argument with a man whom Cox alleged had verbally abused him before the men got into what Cox described as a "little tussle". Sentencing was set for 25 March 2010, with Cox receiving a suspended sentence of six months and ordered to pay compensation, court costs and community service of 250 hours. In early 2016 Cox was sentenced to 26 weeks in prison for assault, harassment, violence to secure entry and criminal damage, which occurred in an attack on his ex-girlfriend. "The WBO European super-middleweight champion was heard in a recording of a 999 call to say: "I will knock you spark out."

== Professional boxing record ==
| 27 fights | 25 wins | 2 losses |
|---|---|---|
| By knockout | 14 | 2 |
| By decision | 11 | 0 |

| No. | Result | Record | Opponent | Type | Round, time | Date | Location | Notes |
|---|---|---|---|---|---|---|---|---|
| 27 | Loss | 25–2 | John Ryder | KO | 2 (12), 0:50 | 5 May 2018 | The O2 Arena, London, England | |
| 26 | Win | 25–1 | Harry Matthews | KO | 2 (6), 2:04 | 24 Mar 2018 | The O2 Arena, London, England | |
| 25 | Loss | 24–1 | George Groves | KO | 4 (12) 1:42 | 14 Oct 2017 | The SSE Arena Wembley, London, England | For WBA (Super) super-middleweight title; World Boxing Super Series: super-middleweight quarter-finals |
| 24 | Win | 24–0 | Giorgi Kandelaki | PTS | 4 | 23 Jul 2017 | Empuriabrava, Catalonia, Spain | |
| 23 | Win | 23–0 | Ivan Jukic | TKO | 1 (4), 0:45 | 1 Jul 2017 | The O2 Arena, London, England | |
| 22 | Win | 22–0 | Lewis Taylor | TD | 9 (12), 2:54 | 27 May 2017 | Bramall Lane, Sheffield, England | Won vacant WBA Continental (Europe) super-middleweight title; UD after Taylor was cut from an accidental head clash |
| 21 | Win | 21–0 | Martin Fidel Rios | PTS | 10 | 22 Oct 2016 | Whites Hotel, Bolton, England | |
| 20 | Win | 20–0 | Ferenc Albert | TKO | 1 (10), 1:08 | 7 Nov 2015 | National Stadium, Dublin, Ireland | Retained WBO European super-middleweight title |
| 19 | Win | 19–0 | Blas-Miguel Martinez | TKO | 1 (10), 2:14 | 24 Jul 2015 | Wembley Arena, London, England | Won vacant WBO European super-middleweight title |
| 18 | Win | 18–0 | Alistair Warren | TKO | 1 (8), 2:30 | 14 Feb 2015 | Civic Centre, Wolverhampton, England | |
| 17 | Win | 17–0 | Matiouze Royer | PTS | 6 | 15 Jun 2013 | Oasis Leisure Centre, Swindon, England | |
| 16 | Win | 16–0 | Obodai Sai | UD | 12 | 9 Sep 2011 | Hilton Hotel, London, England | Won Commonwealth light-middleweight title |
| 15 | Win | 15–0 | Marcus Portman | TKO | 3 (8), 0:51 | 21 May 2011 | The O2 Arena, London, England | |
| 14 | Win | 14–0 | Michael Frontin | PTS | 8 | 13 Feb 2010 | Wembley Arena, London, England | |
| 13 | Win | 13–0 | Manoocha Salari | RTD | 3 (8), 3:00 | 30 Oct 2009 | Echo Arena, Liverpool, England | |
| 12 | Win | 12–0 | János Petrovics | PTS | 8 | 24 Jul 2009 | Oasis Leisure Centre, Swindon, England | |
| 11 | Win | 11–0 | Mark Lloyd | TKO | 8 (8), 2:06 | 24 Apr 2009 | Civic Centre, Wolverhampton, England | |
| 10 | Win | 10–0 | Jason Rushton | TKO | 1 (8), 2:56 | 12 Feb 2009 | Oasis Leisure Centre, Swindon, England | |
| 9 | Win | 9–0 | Ernie Smith | KO | 1 (6), 3:08 | 6 Dec 2008 | ExCeL Arena, London, England | |
| 8 | Win | 8–0 | Billy Smith | TKO | 5 (6), 0:29 | 17 Oct 2008 | Oasis Leisure Centre, Swindon, England | |
| 7 | Win | 7–0 | Steve Conkin | KO | 3 (6) | 12 Sep 2008 | Grosvenor House Hotel, London, England | |
| 6 | Win | 6–0 | Billy Smith | PTS | 6 | 21 Jun 2008 | National Indoor Arena, Birmingham, England | |
| 5 | Win | 5–0 | David Kehoe | TKO | 1 (4), 1:17 | 22 Mar 2008 | International Arena, Cardiff, Wales | |
| 4 | Win | 4–0 | Surinder Sekhon | TKO | 3 (4), 1:45 | 8 Dec 2007 | Bolton Arena, Bolton, England | |
| 3 | Win | 3–0 | David Kirk | PTS | 4 | 3 Nov 2007 | Millennium Stadium, Cardiff, Wales | |
| 2 | Win | 2–0 | Peter Buckley | PTS | 4 | 13 Oct 2007 | York Hall, London, England | |
| 1 | Win | 1–0 | Johnny Greaves | PTS | 4 | 14 Jul 2007 | The O2 Arena, London, England | |
