= Rocky Fielding =

British boxer (born 1987)

Personal information
- Nickname: Rocky
- Born: Michael Fielding; 5 August 1987 (age 39) Liverpool, England
- Height: 6 ft 1 in (185 cm)
- Weight: Super middleweight; Light heavyweight

Boxing career
- Reach: 75 in (191 cm)
- Stance: Orthodox

Boxing record
- Total fights: 33
- Wins: 31
- Win by KO: 18
- Losses: 3

Michael "Rocky" Fielding (born 5 August 1987) is a British professional boxer. He held the WBA (Regular) super-middleweight title in 2018. Fielding held the Commonwealth super-middleweight title twice between 2013 and 2017, and the British super-middleweight title in 2017.

== Biography ==
Born in Liverpool, Merseyside, Rocky was originally named Michael, but owing to his 10 lbs birth weight his father nicknamed him 'The Rock'.

== Amateur career ==
Rocky started out boxing in Stockbridge ABC, as an amateur and reached the 2007 & 2008 ABA Light Heavyweight finals whilst boxing out of Rotunda ABC. He was unbeaten until he met Chris Cook who knocked him out in one round.

== Professional career ==
Fielding turned professional in 2010 and after winning his first three professional bouts as a light-heavyweight, he was offered the chance to drop down in weight to take part in the super-middleweight Prizefighter Series after Kenny Anderson pulled out at short notice. Fielding went on to win the tournament causing a stoppage in each of his three fights and becoming the first boxer in a Prizefighter series to do so.

On 6 October 2012 at Liverpool Olympia, Fielding defeated Carl Dilks to win the vacant English super-middleweight title. Rocky defended his title against Wayne Reed on the Bellew v Chelimba undercard, he dropped Reed three times in this fight and won via technical knockout in the suxth round.

On 21 September 2013 at Liverpool Olympia, Fielding defeated Mohammed Akrong with a first round stoppage to win the vacant Commonwealth super-middleweight title. On 23 October 2013, he defended his title against Luke Blackledge, knocking out his opponent with a left hook 2:32 into the first round.

On 7 November 2015 Fielding took on fellow Liverpudlian Callum Smith at the Echo Arena in their home city for the vacant British super-middleweight title but lost in the first round by technical knockout.

On 22 April 2017 at the Echo Arena he defeated John Ryder by split decision to win the vacant British super-middleweight title. Five months later on 30 September 2017, again at the Echo Arena, Fielding defended the British title and regained the Commonwealth title, which he lost on the scales a few years earlier, with a first round knockout of David Brophy.

Fielding challenged Tyron Zeuge for the WBA (Regular) super-middleweight on 14 July 2018 in Offenburg, Germany. Despite entering the fight as an underdog, he knocked Zeuge out in the fifth round.

His first defense was against two-weight world champion Canelo Álvarez at Madison Square Garden on 15 December 2018. Álvarez floored Fielding in the first, second and third rounds before the referee waved the contest off.

Fielding's next fight came on 15 November 2019 at Liverpool Olympia, against Abdallah Paziwapazi. He won by technical knockout after dropping his opponent with a left hook in the second round.

He was due to challenge British light-heavyweight champion Dan Azeez at Bournemouth International Centre on 17 December 2022, but failed to make the required weight limit. Despite this the fight went ahead with the title no longer on the line and Fielding lost by technical knockout in the eighth round.

== Professional boxing record ==
34 fights	31 wins	3 losses
By knockout	19	3
By decision	12	0

No.	Result	Record	Opponent	Type	Round, time	Date	Location	Notes
34	Win	31–3	Simion Tchetha	TKO	3 (8), 1:56	Nov 21 2025	W Hotel, Palm Jumeirah, Dubai	
33	Loss	30–3	Dan Azeez	TKO	8 (12), 2:05	Dec 17 2022	Bournemouth International Centre, Bournemouth, England	{{small|
32	Win	30–2	Timo Laine	TKO	3 (8), 1:34	Apr 22 2022	Echo Arena, Liverpool, England	
31	Win	29–2	Emmanuel Danso	RTD	2 (10), 3:00	Nov 26 2021	Motospace Dubai Investment Park, Dubai, UAE	
30	Win	28–2	Abdallah Paziwapazi	KO	2 (10), 0:19	Nov 15 2019	Olympia, Liverpool, England	
29	Loss	27–2	Canelo Álvarez	TKO	3 (12), 2:38	Dec 15 2018	Madison Square Garden, New York City, New York U.S.	Lost WBA (Regular) super-middleweight title
28	Win	27–1	Tyron Zeuge	TKO	5 (12), 2:30	Jul 14 2018	Baden-Arena, Offenburg, Germany	Won WBA (Regular) super-middleweight title
27	Win	26–1	Karel Horejšek	PTS	8	Mar 3 2018	FlyDSA Arena, Sheffield, England	
26	Win	25–1	David Brophy	TKO	1 (12), 2:18	Sep 30 2017	Echo Arena, Liverpool, England	Retained British super middleweight title; Won Commonwealth super-middleweight title
25	Win	24–1	John Ryder	SD	12	Apr 22 2017	Echo Arena, Liverpool, England	Won vacant British super-middleweight title
24	Win	23–1	Istvan Zeller	TKO	2 (8), 0:44	Oct 15 2016	Echo Arena, Liverpool, England	
23	Win	22–1	Christopher Rebrassé	SD	12	Apr 2 2016	Echo Arena, Liverpool, England	Retained WBC International super-middleweight title
22	Loss	21–1	Callum Smith	TKO	1 (12), 2:45	Nov 7 2015	Echo Arena, Liverpool, England	For WBC Silver and vacant British super-middleweight titles
21	Win	21–0	Brian Vera	TKO	2 (12), 1:39	Jun 26 2015	Echo Arena, Liverpool, England	Won vacant WBC International super-middleweight title
20	Win	20–0	Olegs Fedotovs	PTS	8	Mar 7 2015	Hull Arena, Hull, England	
19	Win	19–0	Noe Gonzalez Alcoba	TKO	5 (12), 1:07	Jul 12 2014	Echo Arena, Liverpool, England	Won vacant WBA Inter-Continental super-middleweight title
18	Win	18–0	Charles Adamu	UD	12	Mar 15 2014	Echo Arena, Liverpool, England	For vacant Commonwealth super-middleweight title; Fielding failed to make weight, title on the line for Adamu only
17	Win	17–0	Luke Blackledge	KO	1 (12), 2:32	Nov 23 2013	Manchester Arena, Manchester, England	Retained Commonwealth super-middleweight title
16	Win	16–0	Mohammed Akrong	TKO	1 (12), 1:05	Sep 21 2013	Liverpool Olympia, Liverpool, England	Won vacant Commonwealth super-middleweight title
15	Win	15–0	Darren McKenna	PTS	4	Jul 13 2013	Craven Park, Hull, England	
14	Win	14–0	Michal Nieroda	KO	1 (8), 0:59	May 11, 2013	Commonwealth Arena, Glasgow, Scotland	
13	Win	13–0	Wayne Reed	TKO	6 (10), 1:19	Mar 30 2013	Echo Arenal, Liverpool, England	Retained English super-middleweight title
12	Win	12–0	Carl Dilks	TKO	5 (10), 1:20	Oct 6 2012	Liverpool Olympia, Liverpool, England	Won vacant English super-middleweight title
11	Win	11–0	Ferenc Hafner	TKO	1 (6), 2:16	Jul 7 2012	Motorpoint Arena, Sheffield, England	
10	Win	10–0	Ciaran Healy	RTD	3 (6), 3:00	May 18, 2012	Bowlers Exhibition Centre, Manchester, England	
9	Win	9–0	Tommy Tolan	PTS	6	Oct 15 2011	Echo Arena, Liverpool, England	
8	Win	8–0	Paul Morby	PTS	6	Sep 17 2011	Liverpool Olympia, Liverpool, England	
7	Win	7–0	Jamie Ambler	PTS	6	Jul 16 2011	Echo Arena, Liverpool, England	
6	Win	6–0	Tobias Webb	RTD	2 (3), 3:00	Mar 23 2011	Liverpool Olympia, Liverpool, England	Prizefighter: The super-middleweights II - Final
5	Win	5–0	Joe Ainscough	TKO	1 (3), 2:24	Mar 23 2011	Liverpool Olympia, Liverpool, England	Prizefighter: The super-middleweights II - Semi-final
4	Win	4–0	Patrick Maxwell	TKO	2 (3), 2:29	Mar 23 2011	Liverpool Olympia, Liverpool, England	Prizefighter: The super-middleweights II - Quarter-final
3	Win	3–0	Phil Goodwin	PTS	4	Feb 20 2011	Lava & Ignite, Preston, England	
2	Win	2–0	Lee Duncan	PTS	6	Nov 27 2010	Liverpool Olympia, Liverpool, England	
1	Win	1–0	James Tucker	PTS	6	Sep 25 2010	Fit City, Salford, England	

== See also ==
- List of British world boxing champions
- List of world super-middleweight boxing champions

Sporting positions
Regional boxing titles
Vacant Title last held by Paul David	BBBofC (English) super-middleweight champion 6 October 2012 – 2013; Vacated	Vacant Title next held by Callum Smith
Vacant Title last held by George Groves	Commonwealth super-middleweight champion 21 September 2013 – 14 March 2014; Stripped, did not make weight	Vacant Title next held by Isaac Ekpo
Vacant Title last held by George Groves	WBA Inter-Continental super-middleweight champion 12 July 2014 – 2015; Vacated	Vacant Title next held by Martin Murray
Vacant Title last held by Callum Smith	WBC International super-middleweight champion 26 June 2015 – 2017; Vacated	Vacant Title next held by Avni Yıldırım
Vacant Title last held by Callum Smith	British super-middleweight champion 22 April 2017 – 14 July 2018; Won world title	Vacant Title next held by Zach Parker
Preceded by David Brophy	Commonwealth super-middleweight champion 30 September 2017 – 14 July 2018; Won world title	Vacant Title next held by Lerrone Richards
World boxing titles
Preceded by Tyron Zeuge	WBA super-middleweight champion Regular title 14 July 2018 – 15 December 2018	Succeeded by Canelo Álvarez
