= World Boxing Super Series =

Boxing competition

- Type: Elimination tournament
- Industry: Boxing
- Founded: September 9, 2017; 9 years ago in Berlin, Germany
- Founder: Sauerland Promotions; Richard Schaefer
- Headquarters: Pratteln, Switzerland
- Area served: Worldwide
- Key people: Kalle Sauerland
- Owner: Comosa AG
- Website: worldboxingsuperseries.com

The World Boxing Super Series (WBSS) is a professional boxing tournament organised by Comosa AG.

Each weight class features eight boxers competing in an annual knockout competition with the champion from each weight class taking the Muhammad Ali Trophy, named after the former heavyweight champion Muhammad Ali, and sharing a total prize fund of U.S. $50 million, with winner of each tournament receiving U.S. $10 million

== History ==
These tournaments are a joint venture between Sauerland Promotions and Richard Schaefer under the Comosa AG banner. The total prize money is $50 million.

This is considered the first major professional boxing tournament attempt since the Super Six World Boxing Classic, which took place from 2009 to 2011.

The first season of tournament was held from 2017 to 2018 at two weight classes: cruiserweight and super middleweight. The inaugural tournament started in September 2017 and finished with two finals in the summer of 2018. With the tournament, the cruiserweight division crowned its first undisputed champion since 2006.

At a press conference in London on 9 May 2018, a second season was announced, which took place from 2018 to 2019. Bantamweight and light welterweight was confirmed as two of the three weight classes involved. The third weight class was later revealed to be cruiserweight, following the 2017-18 tournament in that division.

The third season was announced in June 2021, with a single tournament for women's super featherweight boxers.

== Qualification ==
All WBA, WBC, WBO, and IBF world champions were eligible to participate in the tournament, as well as all top 15 world-ranked contenders by each of the 4 sanctioning bodies. Comosa AG contracted eight available fighters per weight class, as well as a few potential back-ups.

In both seasons Comosa has staged a draft gala in Monte Carlo and Moscow, Russia to publicly announce all tournament participants and determine the draw. During the gala, the four top seeds select their quarter-final opponents from the four unseeded boxers in a live TV show.

== Judging ==
In addition to the three judges customary in pro boxing, the World Boxing Super Series will be an additional fourth judge whose scorecard will be used if the main three judges deliver a draw result. The fourth judge can also come into play in the event that a tournament fight ends in a no contest or a no-decision and the three official scorecards do not determine a winner.

In addition, if a fight remains a draw even after adding the fourth judge's scorecard to those of the three official judges, the series will use a countback method to determine who advances in the tournament. The countback is a sudden-death method of scoring using the three official judges' scorecards to determine who advances. Beginning with the scorecards for the 12th or last round that occurred, the boxer who won that particular round on at least two of the three scorecards will advance. If the bout was scored evenly in the 12th round or the last round that occurred, the advancing boxer will then be determined by who won at least a majority of scorecards in the preceding round. If neither boxer won the penultimate round on at least a majority of the three official scorecards, each preceding round's scorecards will be examined until a round where one boxer was declared the winner of that round on a majority of the three official scorecards.

== Seasons and finals ==
Season	Year	Weight class	Weight limit			Champion	Runner-up	Result	Date of final	Final host	Ranking for champion		
Season	Year	Weight class	in pounds (lbs)	in kilograms (kg)	in stone (st)	Champion	Runner-up	Result	Date of final	Final host	BoxRec	TBRB	The Ring
I	2017–18	Cruiserweight	200	90.7	14 st 4 lb	(Ukraine) Oleksandr Usyk	(Russia) Murat Gassiev	UD 12	21 Jul 2018	Olimpiyskiy, Moscow, Russia	1	C	C
I	2017–18	Super middleweight	168	76.2	12 st 0 lb	(United Kingdom) Callum Smith	(United Kingdom) George Groves	KO 7	28 Sep 2018	King Abdullah Sports City, Jeddah, Saudi Arabia	1	1	C
II	2018–19	Super lightweight	140	63.5	10 st 0 lb	(United Kingdom) Josh Taylor	(United States) Regis Prograis	MD 12	26 Oct 2019	The O2 Arena, London, United Kingdom	1	1	C
II	2018–19	Bantamweight	118	53.5	8 st 4 lb	(Japan) Naoya Inoue	(Philippines) Nonito Donaire	UD 12	7 Nov 2019	Super Arena, Saitama, Japan	1	1	C
II	2018–20	Cruiserweight	200	90.7	14 st 4 lb	(Latvia) Mairis Briedis	(Cuba) Yuniel Dorticos	MD 12	26 Sep 2020	Plazamedia Broadcasting Center, Munich, Germany	1	C	C

== Awards ==
The WBC intends to award the champions its commemorative Muhammad Ali Diamond belt. Additionally, the winners will receive the Muhammad Ali Trophy.

Due to the 'bracket style' nature of the tournament, the winner of each tournament could claim all world titles in the field. Oleksandr Usyk, the winner of the 2018 cruiserweight tournament, unified the WBO, IBF, WBC and WBA cruiserweight titles and became the first cruiserweight undisputed champion in over a decade, and the first in the four-belt era.

== eWBSS Legends tournaments ==
During the COVID-19 pandemic, the World Boxing Super Series launched a special 'eWBSS Heavyweight Legends' tournament. The fights were simulated on EA Sports 'Fight Night Champion' video game and feature 8 of the most recognisable heavyweights from history. The quarterfinals took place between 23 and 26 March. It was later announced Sonny Liston would replace Joe Frazier as Muhammad Ali's semifinalist opponent. The semifinals took place on 27 and 28 March. The final took place on 29 March.

Quarter-finals
Muhammad Ali (USA)	KO 5
Evander Holyfield (USA)
Joe Frazier (USA)	KO 7
Lennox Lewis (GBR)
Mike Tyson (USA)	KO 2
Eric Esch (USA)
George Foreman (USA)	KO 5
David Haye (GBR)

Semi-finals
Muhammad Ali (USA)	KO 5
Sonny Liston (USA)
Mike Tyson (USA)	KO 4
George Foreman (USA)

Final
Mike Tyson (USA)	UD 12
Muhammad Ali (USA)

A ‘eWBSS Middleweight Legends’ tournament was announced on 29 March 2020. The quarterfinals took place between 30 March and 2 April. It was later announced Jake LaMotta would replace Marvin Hagler as Sugar Ray Robinson's semifinalist opponent. The semifinals took place on 3 and 4 April. The final took place on 5 April.

Quarter-finals
Sugar Ray Robinson (USA)	KO 5
Fernando Vargas (USA)
Marvin Hagler (USA)	KO 8
Kelly Pavlik (USA)
Winky Wright (USA)	KO 9
Sugar Ray Leonard (USA)
Carlos Monzón (ARG)	UD 12
Jake LaMotta (USA)

Semi-finals
Sugar Ray Robinson (USA)	KO 7
Jake LaMotta (USA)
Winky Wright (USA)	KO 8
Carlos Monzón (ARG)

Final
Sugar Ray Robinson (USA)	KO 6
Winky Wright (USA)

== See also ==
- Super Six World Boxing Classic
