= Tyler Denny =

English boxer (born 1991)

Personal information
- Born: 2 July 1991 (age 35) Wordsley, West Midlands, England
- Height: 5 ft 10 in (178 cm)
- Weight: Middleweight

Boxing career
- Stance: Southpaw

Boxing record
- Total fights: 29
- Wins: 21
- Win by KO: 1
- Losses: 5
- Draws: 3

Tyler Denny (born 2 July 1991) is an English professional boxer who is a former European middleweight champion. He has also held the English middleweight title and challenged for the British and Commonwealth championships in the same weight division.

== Career ==
A former Midlands Area amateur champion, Denny turned professional in 2015, defeating Shaun Watt on points in a four-round contest in his first pro-fight on 27 March that year.

Unbeaten in first 11 bouts, he faced Reece Cartwright for the vacant English middleweight title at Walsall Town Hall on 22 September 2018, losing the fight when the ringside doctor ordered it to be stopped in round eight due to facial injuries he had sustained.

Denny had a second attempt at winning the title on 30 November 2019, when he took on Linus Udofia at York Hall in London, but again fell short, losing by majority decision with two of the ringside judges scoring the fight 97–94 and 96–94 for his opponent, while the third had it a 95–95 draw.

On 13 November 2021, Denny hoped to make it third time lucky as he took on River Wilson-Bent for the English title at Coventry Skydome. However, the contest ended in a controversial technical draw when the referee stopped it in the seventh round because of a cut over Wilson-Bent's left eye caused by an accidental clash of heads. The judges' scorecards were split with one favouring each fighter and the other tied.

A rematch was ordered and took place on 25 June 2022 at the same venue. Denny won the fight to finally become English middleweight champion at the fourth time of asking via split decision with two judges giving the bout in his favour 97–93 and 96–93 respectively and the third scoring it 96–94 for Wilson-Bent.

He successfully defended his title with unanimous decision wins over Bradley Rea at Manchester Arena on 12 November 2022, and Brad Pauls at Wembley Arena in London on 11 February 2023.

Denny challenged European middleweight champion Matteo Signani at Wolverhampton Civic Hall on 18 November 2023, winning the bout when his opponent failed to answer the bell at the start of round eight.

He made his first defense of the title against Felix Cash at Resorts World Arena in Birmingham on 22 June 2024. The referee stopped the fight in the fifth round due to a cut on Cash's right eyelid caused by an accidental clash of heads. All three judges scorecards had Denny ahead at that point meaning he retained his crown via technical decision.

Denny faced Hamzah Sheeraz at Wembley Stadium on the undercard of the Anthony Joshua vs Daniel Dubois heavyweight world title contest on 21 September 2024, with his European title and his opponent's Commonwealth belt on the line. He lost by stoppage in the second round.

He got back to winning ways in his next fight, defeating Elvis Ahorgah on points at bp pulse LIVE in Birmingham on 20 April 2025 and followed that up with another win by the same method over Grant Dennis at the Town Hall in Dudley on 5 December 2025.

Denny challenged British and Commonwealth middleweight champion George Liddard at the Copper Box Arena in London on 21 March 2026. He lost via unanimous decision.

In his next fight, Denny faced undefeated Callum Walsh over 10 rounds at 3Arena in Dublin, Ireland, on 8 August 2026. He sent his opponent to the canvas in the first round, before suffering a knockdown himself in the second and eventually losing by unanimous decision.

== Personal life ==
Denny worked as a plumber before becoming a full-time professional boxer.

== Professional boxing record ==
29 fights	21 wins	5 losses
By knockout	1	2
By decision	20	3
Draws	3	

No.	Result	Record	Opponent	Type	Round, time	Date	Location	Notes
29	Loss	21–5–3	Callum Walsh	UD	10	8 Aug 2026	3Arena, Dublin, Ireland	
28	Loss	21–4–3	George Liddard	UD	12	21 Mar 2026	Copper Box Arena, London, England	For British, Commonwealth and vacant IBF Inter-Continental middleweight titles
27	Win	21–3–3	Grant Dennis	PTS	8	5 Dec 2025	Town Hall, Dudley, England	
26	Win	20–3–3	Elvis Ahorgah	PTS	10	20 Apr 2025	bp pulse LIVE, Birmingham, England	
25	Loss	19–3–3	Hamzah Sheeraz	TKO	2 (12), 2:05	21 Sep 2024	Wembley Stadium, London, England	Lost European middleweight title; For WBC Silver and Commonwealth middleweight titles
24	Win	19–2–3	Felix Cash	TD	5 (12), 0:35	22 Jun 2024	bp pulse LIVE, Birmingham, England	Retained European middleweight title; Unanimous TD: Cash cut from accidental head clash
23	Win	18–2–3	Matteo Signani	TKO	8 (12), 0:08	18 Nov 2023	Civic Hall, Wolverhampton, England	Won European middleweight title
22	Win	17–2–3	Macaulay McGowan	SD	10	6 May 2023	bp pulse LIVE, Birmingham, England	Won vacant European External middleweight title
21	Win	16–2–3	Brad Pauls	UD	10	11 Feb 2023	Wembley Arena, London, England	Retained English middleweight title
20	Win	15–2–3	Bradley Rea	UD	10	12 Nov 2022	Manchester Arena, Manchester, England	Retained English middleweight title
19	Win	14–2–3	River Wilson-Bent	SD	10	25 Jun 2022	Skydome, Coventry, England	Won vacant English middleweight title
18	Draw	13–2–3	River Wilson-Bent	TD	7 (10), 1:27	13 Nov 2021	Skydome, Coventry, England	For vacant English middleweight title; Split TD: Wilson-Bent cut from accidental head clash
17	Win	13–2–2	Derrick Osaze	PTS	10	11 Jun 2021	Sheffield Arena Car Park, Sheffield, England	
16	Loss	12–2–2	Linus Udofia	MD	10	30 Nov 2019	York Hall, London, England	For vacant English middleweight title
15	Win	12–1–2	Serge Ambomo	PTS	8	6 Jul 2019	Town Hall, Walsall, England	
14	Win	11–1–2	Vaidas Balciauskas	PTS	6	9 Mar 2019	Town Hall, Walsall, England	
13	Win	10–1–2	Darryl Sharp	PTS	6	8 Dec 2018	Town Hall, Walsall, England	
12	Loss	9–1–2	Reece Cartwright	TKO	8 (10), 2:25	22 Sep 2018	Town Hall, Walsall, England	For vacant English middleweight title
11	Win	9–0–2	Lewis van Poetsch	PTS	6	21 Jul 2018	Town Hall, Walsall, England	
10	Win	8–0–2	Raimonds Sniedze	PTS	6	4 May 2018	Town Hall, Walsall, England	
9	Win	7–0–2	Tom Stokes	PTS	10	30 Sep 2017	Town Hall, Walsall, England	Won vacant Midlands Area middleweight title
8	Win	6–0–2	Anthony Fox	PTS	8	9 Jun 2017	The Venue, Dudley, England	
7	Win	5–0–2	William Warburton	PTS	6	8 Apr 2017	The Venue, Dudley, England	
6	Win	4–0–2	Robert Studziński	PTS	4	4 Nov 2016	The Venue, Dudley, England	
5	Draw	3–0–2	Christian Hoskin Gomez	PTS	4	21 May 2016	Town Hall, Dudley, England	
4	Draw	3–0–1	Simone Lucas	PTS	4	5 Dec 2015	Town Hall, Dudley, England	
3	Win	3–0	James Conroy	PTS	4	3 Oct 2015	Civic Hall, Wolverhampton, England	
2	Win	2–0	Aaron Robinson	PTS	4	6 Jun 2015	Civic Hall, Wolverhampton, England	
1	Win	1–0	Shaunn Watt	PTS	4	27 Mar 2015	The Venue, Dudley, England	
