= Boxing at the 2014 Commonwealth Games – Middleweight =

Boxing competitions

Boxing – Middleweight at the 2014 Commonwealth Games
- Venue: Scottish Exhibition and Conference Centre
- Dates: 26 July – 2 August 2014
- Competitors: 29 from 29 nations

Medalists
gold medal	Antony Fowler	England
silver medal	Vijender Singh	India
bronze medal	Connor Coyle	Northern Ireland
bronze medal	Benny Muziyo	Zambia

The Middleweight boxing competition at the 2014 Commonwealth Games in Glasgow, Scotland took place between 26 July and 2 August at the Scottish Exhibition and Conference Centre.

Like all Commonwealth boxing events, the competition was a straight single-elimination tournament. Both semifinal losers were awarded bronze medals, so no boxers competed again after their first loss. Bouts consisted of three rounds of three minutes each, with one-minute breaks between rounds. Punches scored only if the front of the glove made full contact with the front of the head or torso of the opponent. Tree scored each bout; The winner of the bout was the boxer who won the most rounds.

== Schedule ==
All times are British Summer Time (UTC+1)

Date	Time	Round
Saturday 26 July 2014	13:00 & 19:20	Round of 32
Monday 28 July 2014	14:00 & 19:30	Round of 16
Wednesday 30 July 2014	19:10	Quarter-finals
Friday 1 August 2014	19:05	Semi-finals
Saturday 2 August 2014	19:05	Final

== Medalists ==
Gold	Antony Fowler; England
Silver	Vijender Singh; India
Bronze	Connor Coyle; Northern Ireland
Bronze	Benny Muziyo; Zambia

== Results ==
Round of 32
Jean Bikorimana (RWA)	0
Aaron Prince (TRI)	3
Vijender Singh (IND)	3
Andrew Kometa (KIR)	0
Joseph Mwaselage (TAN)	0
Mujandjae Kasuto (NAM)	3
Imrod Bartholomew (GRN)	0
Siphiwe Lusizi (RSA)	KO2
Sosefo Falekaono (TON)	0
Eric Finau (NZL)	3
Connor Coyle (NIR)	3
Lungile Dyamdeki (LES)	0
Dennis Thomas (GUY)	3
Jonathon Keama (PNG)	0
Kyriakos Panos (CYP)	0
Antony Fowler (ENG)	3
Senanga Nawarathna (SRI)	0
Mark Lucas (AUS)	3
Nickson Abaka (KEN)	3
Petelo Matagi (SAM)	0
Brody Blair (CAN)	2
Abdul Bangura (SLE)	1
Benny Muziyo (ZAM)	3
Michael Gardner (JAM)	0
Arthur Langelier (LCA)	0
Cedric Olivier (MRI)	3

Round of 16
Godfrey Strachan (BAH)	0
Aaron Prince (TRI)	3
Vijender Singh (IND)	3
Mujandjae Kasuto (NAM)	0
Siphiwe Lusizi (RSA)	3
Eric Finau (NZL)	0
Connor Coyle (NIR)	2
Dennis Thomas (GUY)	1
Kieran Smith (SCO)	0
Antony Fowler (ENG)	3
Mark Lucas (AUS)	0
Nickson Abaka (KEN)	3
Brody Blair (CAN)	0
Benny Muziyo (ZAM)	KO2
Cedric Olivier (MRI)	3
Chikondi Makawa (MAW)	0

Quarterfinals
Aaron Prince (TRI)	0
Vijender Singh (IND)	3
Siphiwe Lusizi (RSA)	0
Connor Coyle (NIR)	3
Antony Fowler (ENG)	3
Nickson Abaka (KEN)	0
Benny Muziyo (ZAM)	KO1
Cedric Olivier (MRI)

Semifinals
Vijender Singh (IND)	3
Connor Coyle (NIR)	0
Antony Fowler (ENG)	3
Benny Muziyo (ZAM)	0

Final
Vijender Singh (IND)	0
Antony Fowler (ENG)	3
