= Connor Coyle =

Irish boxer (born 1990)

Personal information
- Nickname: The Kid
- Born: 25 May 1990 (age 36) Derry, Northern Ireland
- Height: 6 ft (183 cm)
- Weight: Middleweight

Boxing career
- Stance: Orthodox

Boxing record
- Total fights: 24
- Wins: 23
- Win by KO: 10
- No contests: 1
Medal record
Men's amateur boxing
Representing Northern Ireland
Commonwealth Games
Bronze medal – third place	2014 Glasgow	Middleweight

Connor Coyle (born 25 May 1990) is an Irish professional boxer who is a former North American Boxing Association middleweight champion. As an amateur he won a bronze medal at the 2014 Commonwealth Games.

== Amateur career ==
Having started boxing aged 12, Coyle went on to win two Ulster Senior Championships in the middleweight division. Representing Northern Ireland at the 2014 Commonwealth Games in Glasgow, Scotland, he took home a bronze medal after defeating South African boxer Siphiwe Lusizi to make it through to the semi-finals, where he lost to India's Vijender Singh.

== Professional career ==
Coyle turned professional in 2016. He moved to Florida in the USA to train under Jim McLoughlin who previously coached former undisputed light-middleweight world champion Winky Wright. Coyle made his pro-debut at the A La Carte Pavilion in Tampa on 7 October 2016, knocking out Euris Silverio in the first of their scheduled four-round bout.

Unbeaten in his first 15 professional contests, Coyle claimed the vacant North American Boxing Association middleweight title with a split decision win over Antonio Todd at Caribe Royale in Orlando, Florida, on 21 May 2022. Two of the ringside judges scoring the fight in his favour 97–93 and 96–94 respectively, while the third had it 96–94 for his opponent.

He made the first defense of his title at the same venue on 11 December 2022, when his opponent, Sladan Janjanin, retired on his stool at the end of round seven.

Coyle successfully defended his championship a further two times, defeating Cristian Fabian Rios by unanimous decision at the Hilton Carillon in Saint Petersburg, Florida, on 29 April 2023, and then stopping Joey Bryant in the fifth round at The Blind Tiger in Biloxi, Mississippi, on 19 August 2023.

He was scheduled to face Austin Williams in Las Vegas on 3 February 2024, in a final eliminator for a shot at the WBA World middleweight title, but was forced to pull out after injuring his right elbow while sparring in training camp for the fight.

The injury kept Coyle out of the ring until 3 August 2024, when he returned with a points win in an eight-round contest against Kyle Lomotey at Oakwell Stadium in Barnsley, England.

His next fight was against Vito Mielnicki Jr at Madison Square Garden in New York for the vacant WBC-USNBC, IBF-USBA and WBO International middleweight titles. The 10-round bout ended in a majority draw, with one judge scoring it 96–94 for Mielnicki Jr, while the other two ruled it a 95–95 tie. In August 2025, it was announced that the fight had been ruled a no contest after Coyle failed a post-fight anti-doping test. The New York State Athletic Commission suspended him until at least 14 November 2025, after which time he had to prove he was a clean athlete by a process of mandatory drug testing, before being allowed to compete again. Coyle was also fined $10,000 and ordered to forfeit 20 percent of his purse from the Mielnicki bout.

Having served his ban, Coyle returned to the competitive boxing ring against Pachino Hill at the Bryan Glazer Family JCC Auditorium in Tampa, Florida, on 24 January 2026. He won by knockout in the eighth and final round.

On 8 August 2026, Coyle defeated Mark Beuke via unanimous decision over 10 rounds at 3Arena in Dublin, Ireland.

== Professional boxing record ==
24 fights	23 wins	0 losses
By knockout	10	0
By decision	13	0
No contests	1	

No.	Result	Record	Opponent	Type	Round, time	Date	Location	Notes
24	Win	23–0 (1)	Mark Beuke	UD	10	8 Aug 2026	3Arena, Dublin, Ireland	
23	Win	22–0 (1)	Pachino Hill	KO	8 (8), 2:25	24 Jan 2026	Bryan Glazer Family JCC Auditorium, Tampa, Florida, U.S.	
22	NC	21–0 (1)	Vito Mielnicki Jr.	NC	10	14 Feb 2025	The Theater at Madison Square Garden, New York City, New York, U.S.	For vacant WBC-USNBC, IBF-USBA and WBO International middleweight titles; Originally an MD draw, later ruled a no contest after Coyle failed a drug test
21	Win	21–0	Kyle Lomotey	RTD	8	2 Aug 2024	Oakwell, Barnsley, England	
20	Win	20–0	Joey Bryant	TKO	5 (10), 2:57	19 Aug 2023	The Blind Tiger, Biloxi, Mississippi, U.S.	Retained WBA-NABA middleweight title
19	Win	19–0	Cristian Fabián Ríos	UD	10	29 Apr 2023	Hilton Carillo, St. Petersburg, Florida, U.S.	Retained WBA-NABA middleweight title
18	Win	18–0	Slađan Janjanin	RTD	7 (10), 3:00	11 Dec 2022	Caribe Royale Orlando, Orlando, Florida, U.S.	Retained WBA-NABA middleweight title
17	Win	17–0	Silverio Ortiz	UD	8	17 Sep 2022	Alessi Gym Fitness Center, Tampa, Florida, U.S.	
16	Win	16–0	Antonio Todd	SD	10	21 May 2022	Caribe Royale Orlando, Orlando, Florida, U.S.	Won vacant WBA-NABA middleweight title
15	Win	15–0	Rodrigo Lopes Rodrigues	RTD	5 (8), 3:00	19 Feb 2022	Memorial Hall, Melrose, Massachusetts, U.S.	Retained ABF Inter-Continental middleweight title
14	Win	14–0	Édgar Ortega	TD	6 (10), 3:00	21 May 2021	Club de Obreros Unidos, Cancún, Mexico	Won vacant ABF Inter-Continental middleweight title; Unanimous TD: Fight stopped due to rainstorm and flooding
13	Win	13–0	Esteban Villalba	KO	1 (10), 1:44	10 Apr 2021	Gym Riberas de Sacramento, Chihuahua City, Mexico	Won vacant ABF American West middleweight title
12	Win	12–0	Miguel Dumas Pérez	RTD	1 (8), 3:00	30 Jan 2020	Yakama Legends Casino, Toppenish, Washington, U.S.	
11	Win	11–0	Rafael Ramon Ramirez	KO	2 (10), 2:05	24 Aug 2019	Viejas Casino & Resort, Alpine, California, U.S.	
10	Win	10–0	Robert Burwell	UD	8	25 Apr 2019	Sam's Town Hotel and Gambling Hall, Sunrise Manor, Nevada, U.S.	
9	Win	9–0	Travis Scott	UD	8	16 Feb 2019	Coliseum, St. Petersburg, Florida, U.S.	
8	Win	8–0	Danny Pastrana	TKO	6 (8), 2:50	16 Jun 2018	Coliseum, St. Petersburg, Florida, U.S.	
7	Win	7–0	Calvin Metcalf	UD	8	21 Nov 2017	Coliseum, St. Petersburg, Florida, U.S.	
6	Win	6–0	Joshua Maxwell	UD	6	12 Aug 2017	A La Carte Event Pavilion, Tampa, Florida, U.S.	
5	Win	5–0	Benjamin Jordan	KO	2 (6), 2:41	10 Jun 2017	Banquet Masters, Clearwater, Florida, U.S.	
4	Win	4–0	Daruma Almenarez	UD	4	17 Mar 2017	A La Carte Event Pavilion, Tampa, Florida, U.S.	
3	Win	3–0	Miguel Aguilar	PTS	4	25 Feb 2017	National Stadium, Dublin, Ireland	
2	Win	2–0	Santos Medrano	PTS	4	5 Nov 2016	National Stadium, Dublin, Ireland	
1	Win	1–0	Euris Silverio	KO	1 (4), 1:17	7 Oct 2016	A La Carte Event Pavilion, Tampa, Florida, U.S.	
