= Matteo Signani =

Italian boxer (born 1979)

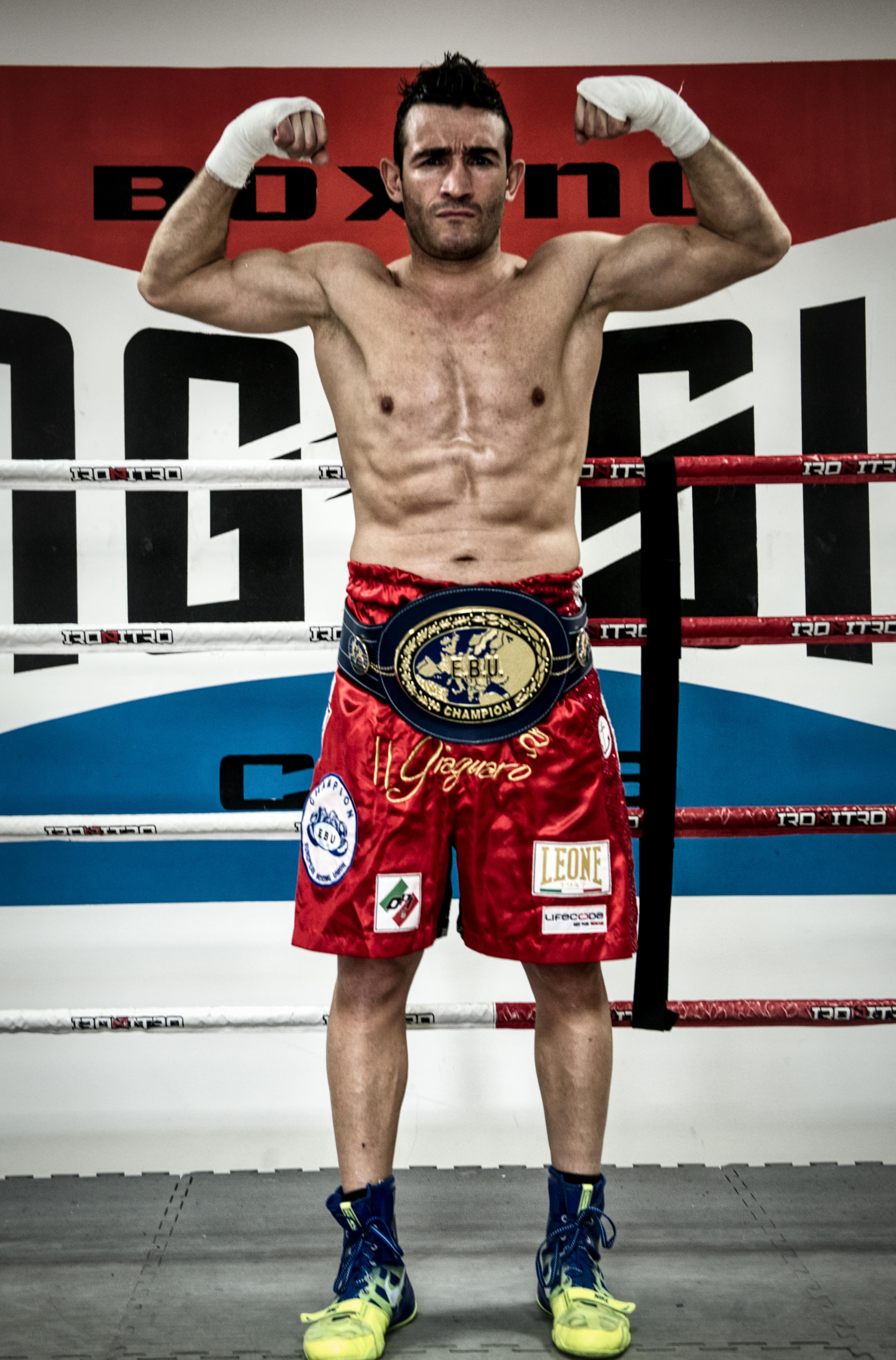
- 2020

Personal information
- Nickname: Il Giaguaro (The Jaguar)
- Nationality: Italian
- Born: 5 June 1979 (age 47) Cesena, Italy
- Height: 1.79 m (5 ft 10 in)
- Weight: Middleweight
- Website: https://www.matteosignani.com

Boxing career
- Stance: Orthodox

Boxing record
- Total fights: 42
- Wins: 32
- Win by KO: 12
- Losses: 7
- Draws: 3

Matteo Signani (born 5 June 1979) is an Italian professional boxer who is a former European middleweight title holder.

== Professional career ==
Signani made his professional debut on 1 April 2007, scoring a second-round technical knockout (TKO) victory against Christian Nichitilea at the Palasport in Rimini, Italy.

After compiling a record of 4–2–1 (3 KOs), he defeated Carlo De Novellis via unanimous decision (UD) to capture the vacant Italian interim middleweight title on 12 July 2008, in Sequals. Signani challenged for the full Italian title three months later, losing via majority decision (MD) against reigning champion Gaetano Nespro on 31 October in Savignano sul Rubicone. Two judges scored the bout 97–93 in favour of Nespro while the third scored even at 95–95.

Following three more victories in 2009–Fares Sawaneh via points decision (PTS) in April; Mugurel Sebe by disqualification (DQ) in June; and Abdelouahed Ben Lelly via PTS in December–Signani made a second attempt at the Italian title in a rematch against Nespro on 29 January 2010, at the Seven Sporting Club in Savignano sul Rubicone. Nespro suffered a cut above his eyebrow in the third round, with the referee deeming the cause to be from a legal punch. The bout was allowed to continue after the ringside doctor inspected the cut. The cut reopened in the eighth round, prompting the ringside doctor called a halt to the contest, awarding Signani the Italian title via eighth-round TKO. He made four defences before losing the title against Simone Rotolo via tenth-round TKO on 2 March 2012, in Savignano sul Rubicone. Signani bounced back with three victories before capturing the Italian title for a second time, defeating Stefano Loriga by UD on 27 July 2013, in Castel Volturno, with the judges' scorecards reading 97–89, 97–92 and 95–94.

After a PTS victory against Goran Milenkovic in a non-title fight in December, Signani faced Istvan Szili for the vacant European Union middleweight title on 2 May 2014, in Gatteo. Both boxers suffered cuts resulting from an accidental clash of heads in the second round. Szili's cut worsened in the third, prompting the referee to call in the ringside doctor. Following an examination, the doctor determined the cut was too severe to allow the fight to continue, bringing a premature end to the contest via technical decision to leave the European Union title vacant. Signani made a second attempt at the title on 6 December, facing Ahmed Rifaie at the Palazzo Congressi in Bellaria. In a fight which saw Signani receive a point deduction in the seventh round for illegal use of the head, he dropped his opponent to the canvas in the twelfth and final round. Signani emerged victorious via UD, with one judge scoring the bout 118–110 while the other two scored it 116–110.

His next fight came against Rafael Sosa Pintos for the vacant WBA Inter-Continental middleweight title on 8 August 2015, in Gatteo. The contest was halted in the eighth round after Pintos suffered a cut from an accidental clash of heads, awarding Signani a TKO victory to capture his third professional title.

He scored a TKO victory against Alexander Bojic in a non-title fight in February 2016, before facing Emanuele Blandamura for the vacant European middleweight title on 3 December at the Palasport in Colleferro. Signani suffered the fifth defeat of his career, losing via split decision (SD) over twelve rounds, with one judge scoring the bout 115–113 in favour of Signani while the other two scored it 117–111 and 115–114 for Blandamura.

After bouncing back with two victories, he defeated Riccardo Lecca via ninth-round TKO on 12 August 2018, capturing the vacant IBF Latino middleweight title in Gatteo.

Three fights later, and in his second attempt, he captured the vacant European title with a SD victory against Gevorg Khatchikian on 11 October 2019, at the PalaTrento in Trento. Two judges scored the bout 116–112 and 115–113 in favour of Signani, while the third judge scored it 115–114 for Khatchikian. In January 2020, it was announced that Signani would make the first defence of his title against Maxime Beaussire on 21 March. However, due to the COVID-19 pandemic, the bout was postponed twice, and eventually took place on 10 October in Caen, France. Signani retained his title with a second-round knockout (KO) victory.

Signani lost his title to Tyler Denny at Wolverhampton Civic Hall in England on 18 November 2023, via technical knockout after failing to answer the bell at the start of the eighth round.

== Professional boxing record ==
38 fights	30 wins	5 losses
By knockout	11	1
By decision	17	4
By disqualification	2	0
Draws	3	

No.	Result	Record	Opponent	Type	Round, time	Date	Location	Notes
38	Win	30–5–3	(France) Maxime Beaussire	TKO	2 (12), 1:40	10 Oct 2020	Palais des Sports, Caen, France	Retained European middleweight title
37	Win	29–5–3	(Netherlands) Gevorg Khatchikian	UD	12	11 Oct 2019	PalaTrento, Trento, Italy	Won vacant European middleweight title
36	Win	28–5–3	(Croatia) Frane Radnic	PTS	6	26 Apr 2019	Tuscany Hall, Florence, Italy	
35	Win	27–5–3	(Bosnia and Herzegovina) Nikola Matic	PTS	6	1 Dec 2018	Cesenatico, Italy	
34	Win	26–5–3	(Italy) Riccardo Lecca	UD	9 (10), 1:31	12 Aug 2018	Gatteo, Italy	Won vacant IBF Latino middleweight title
33	Win	25–5–3	(Serbia) Predrag Cvetkovic	TKO	4 (6), 1:46	24 Mar 2018	Gio Boxe Gym, San Giovanni in Marignano, Italy	
32	Win	24–5–3	(Czech Republic) Anatoli Hunanyan	PTS	6	9 Jun 2017	Biki Disco Dinner, Cattolica, Italy	
31	Loss	23–5–3	(Italy) Emanuele Blandamura	SD	12	3 Dec 2016	Palasport, Colleferro, Italy	For vacant European middleweight title
30	Win	23–4–3	(Serbia) Alexander Bojic	TKO	6 (6)	6 Feb 2016	Coriano, Italy	
29	Win	22–4–3	(Uruguay) Rafael Sosa Pintos	UD	8 (12), 1:02	8 Aug 2015	PalaG, Gatteo, Italy	Won vacant WBA Inter-Continental middleweight title
28	Win	21–4–3	(France) Ahmed Rifaie	UD	12	6 Dec 2014	Palazzo Congressi, Bellaria, Italy	Won vacant European Union middleweight title
27	Draw	20–4–3	(Hungary) Istvan Szili	TD	3 (12)	2 May 2014	PalaSidermec, Gatteo, Italy	Won vacant European Union middleweight title; Szili unable to continue after a cut from an accidental head clash
26	Win	20–4–2	(Serbia) Goran Milenkovic	PTS	6	21 Dec 2013	Bellaria, Italy	
25	Win	19–4–2	(Italy) Stefano Loriga	UD	10	26 Jul 2013	Ristorante Villa La Tortuga, Castel Volturno, Italy	Won vacant Italian middleweight title
24	Win	18–4–2	(Hungary) Attila Kiss	TKO	6 (6)	14 Jun 2013	Savignano sul Rubicone, Italy	
23	Win	17–4–2	(Cuba) Reward Marti	TKO	6 (6)	27 Apr 2013	Seven Sporting Club, Savignano sul Rubicone, Italy	
22	Win	16–4–2	(Hungary) Ferenc Sárközi	DQ	2 (6)	12 Jul 2012	Rimini, Italy	
21	Loss	15–4–2	(Italy) Simone Rotolo	UD	10 (10), 2:03	2 Mar 2012	Seven Sporting Club, Savignano sul Rubicone, Italy	Lost Italian middleweight title
20	Win	15–3–2	(Latvia) Ruslans Pojonisevs	PTS	6	18 Dec 2011	Rimini, Italy	
19	Win	14–3–2	(Czech Republic) Attila Kiss	PTS	6	11 Nov 2011	Palasport, Cernusco sul Naviglio, Italy	
18	Win	13–3–2	(Italy) Lorenzo Cosseddu	UD	10	26 Aug 2011	Piazza Costa, Cesenatico, Italy	Retained Italian middleweight title
17	Win	12–3–2	(France) Martin Owono	PTS	6	25 Jun 2011	Porto, Imperia, Italy	
16	Win	11–3–2	(Italy) Gaetano Nespro	UD	10	8 Apr 2011	Seven Sporting Club, Savignano sul Rubicone, Italy	Retained Italian middleweight title
15	Win	10–3–2	(Italy) Giovanni De Carolis	UD	10	5 Nov 2010	Piazzo Dello Sport, Cesena, Italy	Retained Italian middleweight title
14	Draw	9–3–2	(Italy) Lorenzo Cosseddu	TD	2 (10)	11 Jun 2010	Piazza Cavour, Levanto, Italy	Retained Italian middleweight title
13	Win	9–3–1	(Italy) Gaetano Nespro	TKO	8 (10)	29 Jan 2010	Seven Sporting Club, Savignano sul Rubicone, Italy	Won Italian middleweight title
12	Win	8–3–1	(Italy) Abdelouahed Ben Lelly	PTS	4	26 Dec 2009	Palahockey, Reggio Emilia, Italy	
11	Win	7–3–1	(Romania) Mugurel Sebe	DQ	4 (6)	13 Jun 2009	Piazza Saffi, Forlì, Italy	
10	Win	6–3–1	(Italy) Fares Sawaneh	PTS	6	26 Apr 2009	Palestra Boni, Mantua, Italy	
9	Loss	5–3–1	(Italy) Gaetano Nespro	MD	10	31 Oct 2008	Seven Sporting Club, Savignano sul Rubicone, Italy	For Italian middleweight title
8	Win	5–2–1	(Italy) Carlo De Novellis	UD	10	12 Jul 2008	Sequals, Italy	Won vacant Italian interim middleweight title
7	Draw	4–2–1	(Italy) Stefano Loriga	TD	1 (6)	9 May 2008	Palasport Fabrizio Meoni, Castiglion Fiorentino, Italy	
6	Loss	4–2	(Italy) Carlos De Novellis	PTS	6	21 Mar 2008	Ceccano, Italy	
5	Win	4–1	(Hungary) Antal Kubicsek	KO	3 (6)	9 Mar 2008	Rimini, Italy	
4	Loss	3–1	(Austria) Ali Chakiev	PTS	6	22 Feb 2008	Klagenfurt, Austria	
3	Win	3–0	(Italy) Vincenzo Zarbo	SD	6	26 Dec 2007	Palahockey, Reggio Emilia, Italy	
2	Win	2–0	(Romania) Ioan Florin	TKO	1 (6)	10 Aug 2007	Piaza Anco Marzio, Rome, Italy	
1	Win	1–0	(Romania) Christian Nichitilea	TKO	2 (6)	1 Apr 2007	Palasport, Rimini, Italy	

Sporting positions
Regional boxing titles
New title	Italian middleweight champion Interim title 12 July 2008 – 31 October 2008; Fought for full title	Vacant
Preceded by Gaetano Nespro	Italian middleweight champion 29 January 2010 – 2 March 2012	Succeeded by Simone Rotolo
Vacant Title last held by Simone Rotolo	Italian middleweight champion 26 July 2013 – 2014	Vacant Title next held by Alessandro Goddi
Vacant Title last held by Emanuele Blandamura	European Union middleweight champion 6 December 2014 – 2015	Vacant Title next held by Karim Achour
Vacant Title last held by Arif Magomedov	WBA Inter-Continental middleweight champion 8 August 2015 – July 2016	Vacant Title next held by Nuhu Lawal
Vacant Title last held by Hector Saldivia	IBF Latino middleweight champion 12 August 2018 – 2019	Vacant
Vacant Title last held by Kamil Szeremeta	European middleweight champion 11 October 2019 – present	Incumbent
