= Kamil Gardzielik =

Polish boxer (born 1992)

Personal information
- Born: August 2, 1992 (age 34) Turek, Poland
- Height: 6 ft 0 in (183 cm)
- Weight: Middleweight

Boxing career
- Reach: 72 in (183 cm)
- Stance: Orthodox

Boxing record
- Total fights: 20
- Wins: 20
- Win by KO: 4
- Losses: 1
- No contests: 0
Medal record
Representing Poland
Men's Boxing
World Combat Games
Bronze medal – third place	2010 Beijing	69kg

Kamil Gardzielik is a Polish Professional boxer.

== Amateur career ==
In 2010, Gardzielik competed in the World Combat Games at the 69 kg category. He made it to the semifinals before losing to eventual winner Vasile Belous. Gardzielik would claim the bronze medal as there was no third place bout.

Five years later, he would compete at the 2015 European Games in Baku. He would only make it to the quarterfinals before losing to Zoltán Harcsa.

== Professional career ==
Gardzielik would make his professional debut on 12 November 2016 against Belarusian fighter Ruslan Rodzivich. He would win his professional debut via a Points Decision.

His first challenge of a fight would come four fights later, where he faced off against Ukrainian-Polish fighter, Artem Karpets, who at the time was 21–5. Gardzielik would assert his dominance, and win the fight via Unanimous Decision.

He would return over a week later where he faced off against fellow countryman Leopold Krzeszewski. Gardzielik would win by yet another Unanimous Decision.

Three fights later, he would face off against Argentinian boxer Tomas Andres Reynoso in the main event of Challengers Boxing Night 1. Gardzielik would win via yet another Unanimous Decision and in the process improving to 12–0.

His next fight came three months later, where he took on Colombia's Joel Julio in his home town of Turek. Gardzielik would win in front of his hometown crowd via Unanimous Decision.

Two fights later, he would face off against Oleksandr Ivanov in the main event of Knockout Boxing Night 23. Gardzielik would win the fight via Split Decision.

After four fights, and three years later, Gardzielik faced Vito Mielnicki Jr. in his first fight outside of his native Poland. Gardzielik lost the fight via Unanimous Decision.

== Professional boxing record ==
21 fights	20 wins	1 loss
By knockout	4	0
By decision	16	1

No.	Result	Record	Opponent	Type	Round, time	Date	Location	Notes
21	Win	20–1	Yevhen Turovskiy	MD	6	15 Mar 2026	Hala Widowiskowo-Sportowa, Jastrzębie-Zdrój, Poland	
20	Loss	19–1	Vito Mielnicki Jr.	UD	10	21 Jun 2025	Prudential Center, Newark, New Jersey, U.S	For vacant WBC USA, IBF-USBA, and WBO Global middleweight titles
19	Win	19–0	Łukasz Barabasz	MD	6	16 Nov 2024	KGHM Arena Ślęza, Wrocław, Poland	
18	Win	18–0	Pavel Semjonov	UD	8	20 Apr 2024	KGHM Arena Ślęza, Wrocław, Poland	
17	Win	17–0	Yaniel Evander Rivera	MD	8	7 Oct 2023	Hala Widowiskowo-Sportowa, Jastrzębie-Zdrój, Poland	
16	Win	16–0	Vojtech Majer	TKO	1 (6) 2:20	20 May 2023	Opera i Filharmonia Podlaska, Białystok, Poland	
15	Win	15–0	Oleksandr Ivanov	SD	8	5 Aug 2022	Amfiteatr nad Jeziorem Czos, Mrągowo, Poland	
14	Win	14–0	Nicolas Luque Palacios	UD	10	6 Nov 2021	Hala Sportowa, ul. Nadbrzezna, Nowy Sącz, Poland	
13	Win	13–0	Joel Julio	UD	8	9 Jul 2021	Hala Widowiskowo-Sportowa, Turek, Poland	
12	Win	12–0	Tomas Andres Reynoso	UD	8	10 Apr 2021	DoubleTree by Hilton Hotel Conference Centre, Warsaw, Poland	
11	Win	11–0	David Bency	UD	8	4 Dec 2020	DoubleTree by Hilton Hotel, Łódź, Poland	
10	Win	10–0	Mikalai Kuzmitski	UD	8	23 Nov 2019	Hala MOSiR, Radom, Poland	
9	Win	9–0	Marcos Jesus Cornejo	UD	8	9 Nov 2018	Hala Widowiskowo-Sportowa MOSiR, Konin, Poland	
8	Win	8–0	Damian Mielewczyk	UD	8	4 May 2018	Hala Sportowa Sokolnia, Kościerzyna, Poland	
7	Win	7–0	Giorgi Jintcharadze	RTD	3 (8) 3:00	17 Mar 2018	Poznań, Poland	
6	Win	6–0	Leopold Krzeszewski	UD	6	21 Oct 2017	Kopalnia Soli, Wieliczka, Poland	
5	Win	5–0	Artem Karpets	UD	6	13 Oct 2017	Hala Sportowa, ul. Berlinga, Nowy Dwór Mazowiecki, Poland	
4	Win	4–0	Roland Oroszlan	KO	1 (6) 1:06	16 Sep 2017	Hala MOSiR, Konin, Poland	
3	Win	3–0	Przemysław Gorgoń	UD	4	20 May 2017	Hala Arena, Poznań, Poland	
2	Win	2–0	Kasjan Inglot	TKO	3 (4) 1:28	17 Mar 2017	Aqua Żyrardów, Żyrardów, Poland	
1	Win	1–0	Ruslan Rodzivich	PTS	4	12 Nov 2016	Arena Kalisz, Kalisz, Poland	
