= Patmore Estate =

Housing estate in Battersea, London

Coordinates: 51.4759°N 0.1393°W

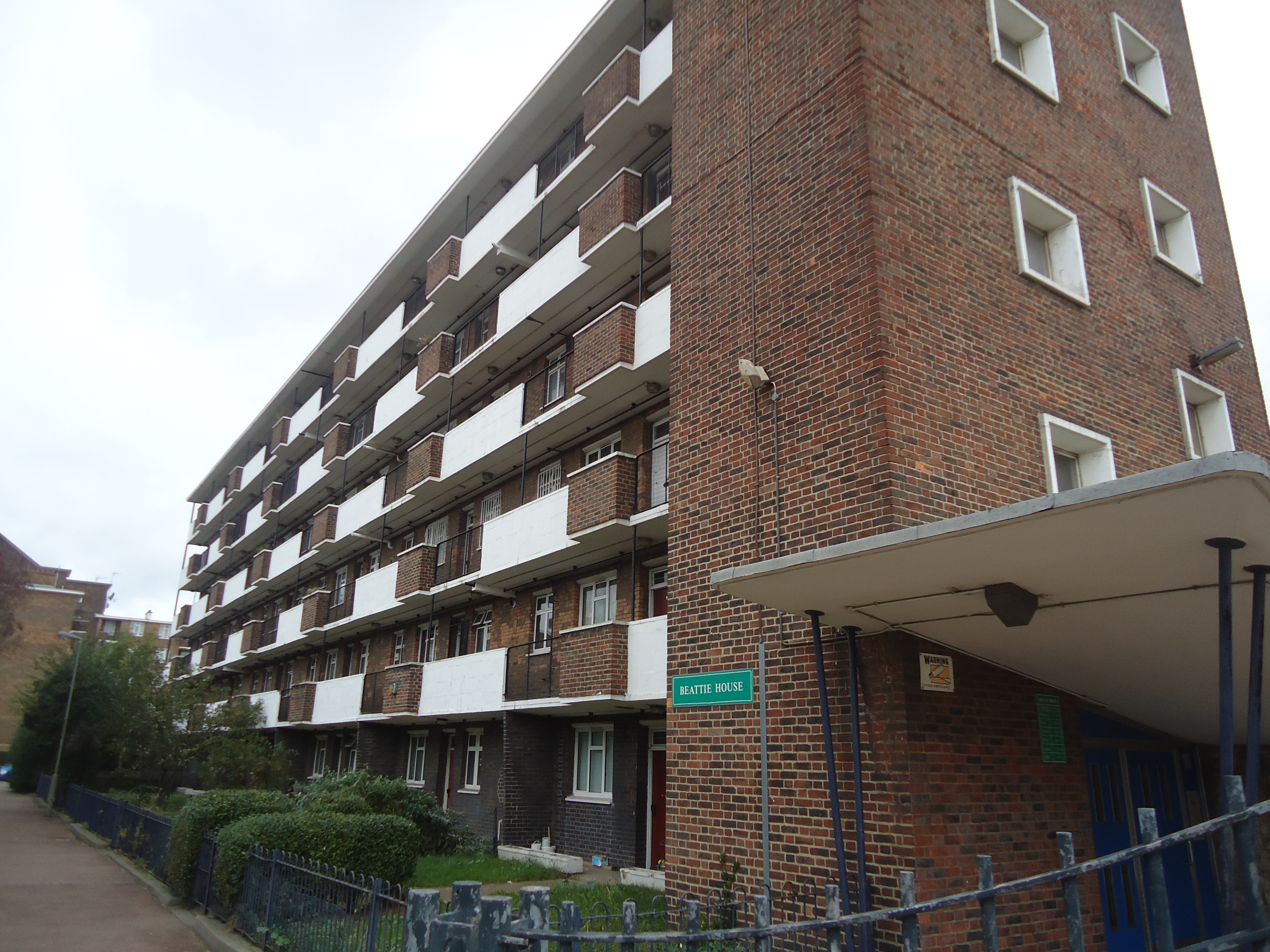
Beattie House, Patmore Estate

Patmore Estate is a housing estate in Battersea within the London Borough of Wandsworth in London, England. The 28 red-brick apartment buildings were erected in the 1950s. It is right next to Savonna Estate and Battersea Power Station.

== Notable residents ==
- Malachi Kirby, actor
- Jason Okundaye, journalist
- Denzel Bentley, boxer
