= Denzel Bentley =

English boxer (born 1995)

Personal information
- Nickname: 2 Sharp
- Born: Denzel Bentley Ntim-Mensah; 29 January 1995 (age 31) Battersea, London, England
- Height: 5 ft 11 in (180 cm)
- Weight: Middleweight

Boxing career
- Reach: 72 in (183 cm)
- Stance: Orthodox

Boxing record
- Total fights: 27
- Wins: 23
- Win by KO: 18
- Losses: 3
- Draws: 1

Denzel Bentley Ntim-Mensah (born 29 January 1995) is a British professional boxer who previously held the World Boxing Organization (WBO) middleweight title in 2026. He is also a three-time British middleweight champion and one-time European middleweight title holder.

== Early life ==
Denzel Bentley was born and raised on the Patmore Estate in Battersea, south-west London. He was first introduced to boxing having purchased boxing gloves and head gear from the adjacent Nine Elms Market & sparring with his older brother before engaging in local bouts with youths from the estate.

== Professional career ==
Bentley made his professional debut on 14 October 2017, scoring a first-round knockout (KO) victory against Casey Blair at the York Hall in London.

After compiling a record of 13–0 (11 KOs) he faced Mark Heffron in an eliminator for the British middleweight title on 12 September 2020 at the York Hall. Bentley scored a knockdown in the second round en route to a unanimous draw, with all three judges scoring the bout 95–95.

The pair fought in a rematch two months later on 13 November at the BT Sport Studio in London, with the vacant British middleweight title on the line. Bentley landed a right hand in the second round, causing damage to Heffron's left eye. Bentley began to target Heffron's damaged eye over the next two rounds. At the end of the fourth, Heffron's eye was swollen shut, forcing his trainer to pull Heffron out of the fight, handing Bentley a fourth-round stoppage victory via corner retirement (RTD) to capture the British title.

He lost his title on 24 April 2021, against Commonwealth middleweight champion Felix Cash, by third round technical knockout at York Hall.

Bentley won the vacant British middleweight title on 13 May 2022, with a split decision success over Linus Udofia at Indigo at The O2 in London.

He went on to hold the championship until 18 November 2023, when he lost to Nathan Heaney by majority decision at Manchester Arena.

Bentley won the vacant WBO International middleweight title with a second round stoppage of Danny Dignum at York Hall on 11 May 2024.

At the same venue, he successfully defended his belt thanks to another second round stoppage on 17 August 2024, this time against Derrick Osaze.

Bentley became a three-time British middleweight champion, as well as claiming the vacant European title, with a unanimous decision win over Brad Pauls at Wembley Arena in London on 7 December 2024.

After 16 months out of the competitive boxing ring, Bentley returned to face Endry Saavedra for the vacant interim WBO middleweight title at The O2 Arena in London on 4 April 2026. He won by stoppage in the seventh round.

On 20 July 2026, Bentley was elevated to full WBO middleweight champion after Janibek Alimkhanuly vacated the title. He was stripped of the title on 30 October 2026 after the WBO rejected his request to delay facing mandatory challenger Yoenlis Hernández.

Having signed with Zuffa Boxing, Bentley made his debut for the promotion at the Copper Box Arena in London on 7 November 2026, defeating Shane Mosley Jr. via unanimous decision over 10 rounds.

== Professional boxing record ==
27 fights	23 wins	3 losses
By knockout	18	1
By decision	5	2
Draws	1	

No.	Result	Record	Opponent	Type	Round, time	Date	Location	Notes
27	Win	23–3–1	Shane Mosley Jr.	UD	10	7 Nov 2026	Copper Box Arena, London, England	
26	Win	22–3–1	Endry Saavedra	TKO	7 (12), 1:38	4 Apr 2026	The O2 Arena, London, England	Won vacant WBO interim middleweight title
25	Win	21–3–1	Brad Pauls	UD	12	7 Dec 2024	Wembley Arena, London, England	Won British middleweight title, and vacant European middleweight title; Retained WBO International middleweight title
24	Win	20–3–1	Derrick Osaze	TKO	2 (10), 2:27	17 Aug 2024	York Hall, Bethnal Green, London, England	Retained WBO International middleweight title
23	Win	19–3–1	Danny Dignum	TKO	2 (12), 2:53	11 May 2024	York Hall, Bethnal Green, London, England	Won vacant WBO International middleweight title
22	Loss	18–3–1	Nathan Heaney	MD	12	11 Nov 2023	Manchester Arena, Manchester, England	Lost British middleweight title
21	Win	18–2–1	Kieran Smith	KO	1 (12), 0:45	15 Apr 2023	Copper Box Arena, London, England	Retained British middleweight title
20	Loss	17–2–1	Janibek Alimkhanuly	UD	12	12 Nov 2022	Palms Resort Casino, Las Vegas, Nevada, US	For WBO middleweight title
19	Win	17–1–1	Marcus Morrison	TKO	4 (12), 2:00	16 Sept 2022	York Hall, London, England	Retained British middleweight title
18	Win	16–1–1	Linus Udofia	SD	12	13 May 2022	Indigo at The O2, Greenwich, London, England	Won vacant British middleweight title
17	Win	15–1–1	Sam Evans	TKO	3 (10), 2:31	6 Nov 2021	Utilita Arena, Birmingham, England	
16	Loss	14–1–1	Felix Cash	TKO	3 (12), 1:24	24 Apr 2021	York Hall, London, England	Lost British middleweight title; For Commonwealth middleweight title
15	Win	14–0–1	Mark Heffron	RTD	4 (12), 3:00	13 Nov 2020	BT Sport Studio, London, England	Won vacant British middleweight title
14	Draw	13–0–1	Mark Heffron	UD	10	12 Sep 2020	York Hall, London, England	
13	Win	13–0	Mick Hall	RTD	6 (10), 3:00	25 Jul 2020	BT Sport Studio, London, England	
12	Win	12–0	Adam Grabiec	TKO	2 (8), 1:35	21 Dec 2019	Copper Box Arena, London, England	
11	Win	11–0	Kelcie Ball	TKO	1 (6), 1:12	27 Sep 2019	Royal Albert Hall, London, England	
10	Win	10–0	Pavol Garaj	PTS	6	27 Apr 2019	The SSE Arena, London, England	
9	Win	9–0	Julio Cesar	TKO	2 (4), 1:42	8 Mar 2019	Royal Albert Hall, London, England	
8	Win	8–0	Emmanuel Moussinga	TKO	1 (8), 2:07	7 Dec 2018	Hilton Hotel, London, England	
7	Win	7–0	Serge Ambomo	TKO	2 (6), 1:55	19 Nov 2018	Hilton Hotel, London, England	
6	Win	6–0	Daniel Urbanski	KO	1 (6), 1:11	29 Sep 2018	York Hall, London, England	
5	Win	5–0	Christian Gomez	PTS	6	14 Jul 2018	York Hall, London, England	
4	Win	4–0	Martin Kabrhel	TKO	2 (4)	9 Jun 2018	Alexandra Palace, London, England	
3	Win	3–0	Ashley Dumetz	KO	1 (6), 1:28	10 Mar 2018	Camden Centre, London, England	
2	Win	2–0	Sam Omidi	TKO	1 (4), 0:44	8 Dec 2017	Hilton Hotel, London, England	
1	Win	1–0	Casey Blair	KO	1 (4), 0:44	14 Oct 2017	York Hall, London, England	

== See also ==
- List of male boxers
- List of British world boxing champions
- List of world middleweight boxing champions

Sporting positions
Regional boxing titles
Vacant Title last held by Liam Williams	British middleweight champion November 13, 2020 – April 24, 2021	Succeeded by Felix Cash
Vacant Title last held by Felix Cash	British middleweight champion May 13, 2022 – November 18, 2023	Succeeded by Nathan Heaney
Vacant Title last held by Meiirim Nursultanov	WBO International middleweight champion May 11, 2024 – 2025; Vacated	Vacant Title next held by Endry José Pinto
Preceded by Brad Pauls	British middleweight champion December 7, 2024 – 2025; Vacated	Vacant Title next held by Kieron Conway
Vacant Title last held by Hamzah Sheeraz	European middleweight champion December 7, 2024 – 2025; Vacated	Vacant Title next held by Bilel Jkitou
World boxing titles
Vacant Title last held by Janibek Alimkhanuly	WBO middleweight champion Interim title April 4 – July 20, 2026; Promoted	Vacant
Vacant Title last held by Janibek Alimkhanuly	WBO middleweight champion July 20 – October 30, 2026; Stripped	Vacant
