= Jason Okundaye =

British journalist, author (born 1997)

- Born: 30 January 1997 (age 29); Tooting, London, England
- Education: Pembroke College, Cambridge (BA)
- Occupations: Journalist; columnist; author; archivist
- Notable work: Revolutionary Acts (2024)

Jason Osamede Okundaye (born 30 January 1997) is a British writer. He is currently Assistant Opinion Editor at The Guardian, having previously served as Assistant Newsletter Editor for The Guardian's "The Long Wave".

The Evening Standard named him one of London's leading emerging writers. He works as a freelance journalist and essayist, covering topics such as politics, history, and popular culture and media, and previously had a column in Tribune. His debut book Revolutionary Acts (2024) received a Somerset Maugham Award.

== Early life and education ==
Okundaye was born at St George's Hospital, Tooting, London to Nigerian parents and grew up on the Patmore Estate in Battersea. He attended Sacred Heart Roman Catholic Primary School and won a scholarship to Whitgift School in Croydon. He went on to study Human, Social and Political Sciences at Pembroke College, Cambridge. During his time at the university, he led the Cambridge Students' Union Black and Minority Ethnic society.

Okundaye first caught the media's attention in 2017, after a series of posts on social media about racism in the United Kingdom in which he claimed that racism manifested in all social groups.

Following the coverage, Okundaye experienced racist abuse, death threats and rape threats.

== Career ==
Prior to the COVID-19 pandemic, Okundaye worked in policy, seeing his writing as a side hobby. He then quit his job to freelance as a writer full time.

He has been a regular contributor to The Guardian, the London Review of Books, Vice, Dazed, i-D, GQ, the Evening Standard, and Bustle. He has also written for NME, the New Statesman, British Vogue, The Independent, The New York Times, the Financial Times, Time Out, and The Sunday Times. In 2020 and 2021, he had a column in Tribune Magazine.

Okundaye is vocal about a number of social and political issues in the UK, writing about them from a left-wing perspective. He has written about topics such as race in British society, politics, the housing crisis, the monarchy, and Black British LGBT+ culture with a speciality in the experiences and history of Black British gay men. In addition, he covers popular culture and media in the film, television, theatre, music, and literary worlds.

In 2021, Okundaye co-founded the digital archive and podcast "Black & Gay, Back in the Day" with Marc Thompson.

=== Revolutionary Acts ===
His debut book titled Revolutionary Acts (2024), documents Black British gay history and culture from the 1970s to the present. The book is structured around profiling the following figures: Ted Brown, Dirg Aaab-Richards, Alex Owolade, Calvin "Biggy" Dawkins, Dennis Carney, Ajamu X, and Thompson.

The Guardian called Revolutionary Acts a "groundbreaking debut", while Bricks magazine called it "a dynamic and crucial narration of Black queer history for the 21st century". Revolutionary Acts won a Somerset Maugham Award and was shortlisted for the Orwell Prize for Political Writing. It was also longlisted for the Polari Prize for LGBTQ+ writers in the First Book category. Okundaye was one of several authors to withdraw his book from the Prize in protest of the inclusion of John Boyne over his anti-transgender views. Okundaye explained his decision in The Guardian, writing he "felt misled about the principles underpinning the organisation and I no longer cared to be awarded by it."

== Personal life ==
Okundaye lost his father to cardiomyopathy in 2016. In 2021, he wrote a piece for The Guardian on his regrets regarding not coming out as gay before his father's death.

== Bibliography ==
=== Books ===
- Revolutionary Acts: Stories of Love, Brotherhood, and Resilience from Black Gay Britain (1st hardcover ed.). Faber. 2024. ISBN 9780571372218.

=== Essays ===
- "Pilgrimage on the P5 Bus" in The Alternative Guide to the London Boroughs for Open House London, edited by Owen Hatherley (2020)
- "Entering the Scene: Finding a community of love" in Black Joy, edited by Charlie Brinkhurst-Cuff and Timi Sotire (2021)

== Accolades ==
Year	Award	Category	Title	Result	Ref.
2024	Orwell Prize		Revolutionary Acts: Love & Brotherhood in Black Gay Britain	Shortlisted	
2025	Somerset Maugham Award		Revolutionary Acts: Love & Brotherhood in Black Gay Britain	Won	
2025	Polari First Book Prize		Revolutionary Acts: Love & Brotherhood in Black Gay Britain	Withdrew	
