= Hamzah Sheeraz =

British boxer (born 1999)

Personal information
- Born: Mohammed Hamzah Sheeraz; 25 May 1999 (age 27) Slough, Berkshire, England
- Height: 6 ft 3 in (191 cm)
- Weight: Light middleweight; Middleweight; Super middleweight

Boxing career
- Reach: 75 in (191 cm)
- Stance: Orthodox

Boxing record
- Total fights: 25
- Wins: 24
- Win by KO: 19
- Losses: 0
- Draws: 1

Mohammed Hamzah Sheeraz (born 25 May 1999) is a British professional boxer. He previously held the World Boxing Organization (WBO) super middleweight title in 2026. At regional level, he held the European middleweight title in 2024 and the Commonwealth title between 2022 and 2024.

== Early life ==
Sheeraz was born on 25 May 1999 in Slough in Berkshire, England. His father is of Pakistani Muslim descent and his mother is of Indian Muslim descent. His paternal family belongs to the Janjua clan of Punjabi Rajputs, originating in the village of Matore, in the Kahuta Tehsil of Rawalpindi District in Punjab, Pakistan. His father Kamran Sheeraz was a cricketer who played for Gloucestershire while his paternal grandfather and uncle were both boxers, the latter winning ten national amateur titles for the Slough and Pinewood Star clubs. Hamzah attended Valentines High School in his youth.

== Amateur career ==
I never set sights of being an Olympian, going to world amateur championships, this-that-and the other, it’s difficult to explain but I just didn’t have that much interest in it. The professional game and winning pro titles is just so much more appealing to me.

— Sheeraz discussing his motivations for turning pro early

Sheeraz was first directed to a gym by his uncle at the age of eight and had his first bout at 12. He went on to become a three-time finalist at the national junior championships. However, he became disillusioned with the sport after being overlooked for the Commonwealth Youth championships and took a year off to focus on an electrician's apprenticeship. A meeting with his then-trainer Lenny Butcher led him to come back and try his hand as a professional.

== Professional career ==
=== Light-middleweight ===
==== Early career ====
Sheeraz turned professional in 2017, signing a deal with Frank Warren's Queensberry Promotions on his eighteenth birthday. He made his pro debut on 16 September 2017 on the undercard of the Billy Joe Saunders–Willie Monroe Jr. world title fight at the Copper Box Arena in London. He defeated 35-year-old journeyman Duane Green via technical knockout (TKO) in the second round for his first victory. By the beginning of 2019 he was sporting a 6–0 record. He dropped Rod Douglas Jr. three times en route to a first-round TKO in March before stopping Ladislav Nemeth in the second round of their April bout at Wembley Arena. He registered his third-straight TKO victory on 13 July, beating Scott James in under two minutes on the undercard of the Daniel Dubois–Nathan Gorman British heavyweight title fight at The O2 Arena in London.

==== Rise up the ranks ====
On 30 November 2019, Sheeraz defeated "Ruthless" Ryan Kelly (14–2, 7 KOs) by sixth-round TKO for the vacant WBO European junior-middleweight title. Late in the sixth round of their fight at Arena Birmingham, he dropped his opponent with a straight right hand. Kelly got up but was forced back onto the ropes as Sheeraz threw a barrage of punches that he was not able to overcome. The referee stopped the fight with two seconds left in the round, giving Sheeraz his first title belt as a professional. The win also moved him into the top 15 in the WBO rankings.

He retained his title with stoppage wins over Paul Kean on 10 July 2020, Guido Nicolas Pitto on 28 November 2020. and Ezequiel Gurria on 24 July 2021

Sheeraz defended his title for a fourth and final time against Bradley Skeete at the Copper Box Arena in London on 4 December 2021 winning the fight by stoppage in the ninth-round of a controversial contest which saw him docked a point in round eight for punching Skeete while he was on the canvas after being knocked down.

The UK Boxing Writers' Club voted Sheeraz as their 2021 Young Boxer of the Year.

=== Middleweight ===
Following the Skeete fight, Sheeraz vacated his title and moved up weight divisions for his next contest which saw him defeat Jez Smith by stoppage in the second round at Wembley Arena in London on 19 March 2022 to claim the vacant WBC International Silver middleweight title.

On 16 July 2022, he stopped Argentina's Francisco Emanuel Torres in the fifth-round at the Copper Box Arena to win the vacant WBC Silver middleweight title.

Sheeraz then closed out his 2022 campaign by defending his title and adding the vacant Commonwealth middleweight belt to his growing collection of championships thanks to a second-round stoppage success over River Wilson-Bent at The O2 Arena on 26 November.

Previously unbeaten Dmytro Mytrofanov was next to fall victim to Sheeraz's punching power as he was knocked out in round two of their bout in Poland on 26 August 2023.

He made even shorter work of opponent Liam Williams in his next contest knocking out the Welshman in round one at the Copper Box Arena on 10 February 2024.

==== Sheeraz vs. Williams ====
On June 1, 2024, at Kingdom Arena in Riyadh, Saudi Arabia, Sheeraz dominated Austin Williams in an 11th-round TKO to win the WBC middleweight title eliminator as the captain of Queensberry promotions in the 5vs5 event.

On September 21, 2024, in London, England, Sheeraz defeated Tyler Denny by TKO in the second round to win European, Commonwealth and WBC "Silver" middleweight titles.

In November 2024, Sheeraz vacated his European title ahead of a planned world title fight.

==== Sheeraz vs. Adames ====
Sheeraz challenged WBC middleweight champion Carlos Adames at The Venue Riyadh Season in Riyadh, Saudi Arabia, on 22 February 2025. The fight ended in a split draw with one ringside judge scoring it 115–114 in his favour, another seeing it 118–110 for his opponent, while the third had it a 114–114 draw.

=== Super middleweight ===
On 12 March 2025, Frank Warren told Ring Magazine that due to weight issues, Sheeraz would move up to the super middleweight division for his next fight and remain at the weight for the foreseeable.

==== Sheeraz vs Berlanga ====
On 20 April, Ring Magazine announced a card to take place in New York, promoted by themselves on 12 July 2025 on DAZN. Sheeraz was revealed to headline the card against former world title challenger, Edgar Berlanga (23–1, 18 KOs), in a WBC title eliminator. Berlanga's sole career defeat came against Canelo Álvarez via unanimous decision in September 2024. He had a comeback win in March 2025, prior to the fight being announced. It was reported the co-headline fight, featuring Shakur Stevenson and William Zepeda will be treated as the main event during fight week, however on Sheeraz vs. Berlanga would headline the card itself on fight night. On 15 May, Ring Magazine announced the card would take place at the Louis Armstrong Stadium, located in USTA Billie Jean King National Tennis Center in the Flushing Meadows-Corona Park in Queens. This would mark the first time the stadium would host a boxing event. From the moment the bout was confirmed, tensions flared between the two fighters, kicking off at the launch press conference. Both weighed the same 167.6 pounds.

Sheeraz delivered a flawless fifth-round knockout against Berlanga in their WBC title eliminator. Sheeraz showcased his power by knocking Berlanga down twice in the fourth round with a series of combinations, leaving the latter visibly shaken and struggling to survive until the end of the round. As the fifth round commenced, Sheeraz concluded the bout decisively with a right-left combination, sending Berlanga to the canvas for the third time. The referee, David Fields, promptly stopped the fight just 17 seconds into the round. According to CompuBox, Sheeraz landed 62 of 162 punches thrown (38.3%) and Berlanga landed 46 of his 119 thrown (38.7).

After the fight Sheeraz addressed the talks about him fighting Canelo Álvarez in 2026. He responded, "It would be an honor to share the ring with him; it genuinely would. Someone I've looked up to, and next thing you know you're in the ring with them. I'll put on a good performance because that's what it's about, daring to be great and I'll do just that." Sheeraz addressed the $100,000 wager that he and Berlanga had agreed upon. However, Sheeraz informed Berlanga to keep the money, citing his religious beliefs that prohibit gambling. The bet was originally proposed by Berlanga.

==== Sheeraz vs. Begić ====
On 11 September 2025, his manager Spencer Brown stated there was a chance that Sheeraz could challenge European champion Callum Simpson (18–0, 13 KOs) in November. This would be in the interim, whilst waiting for the outcome of Álvarez vs. Crawford, which Crawford won. On 15 October, the EBU confirmed that discussions were taking place between the two teams. They were given a deadline of 28 October, after which purse bids would be requested. Sheeraz spoke about wanting to fight in the United States again, mentioning big names. He stated that he thrived being in an underdog position going into a fight. The aim was to fight again before February 2026.

On 3 December 2025, the WBC mandated Sheeraz and Christian M'billi to fight for the vacant WBC super middleweight title. The decision was made after Terence Crawford was stripped for not paying sanctioning fees. On 22 December, the WBO ordered Sheeraz to begin negotiations with Diego Pacheco for their vacant title. The 20-day negotiation period passed without an agreement and the fight headed to purse bids. According to Warren, Sheeraz was going to pursue the WBO title, with purse bids due on 19 January 2026. This was despite his manager Spencer Brown, indicating an interest in a bout against Mbilli, Sheeraz also turned down IBF's invitation to open negotiations against Osleys Iglesias for their vacant title, due to scheduling conflicts and existing commitments. On 31 January, Pacheco removed himself from negotiations. The WBO moved on to the next available challenger, German boxer Alem Begic (29–0–1, 23 KOs), with Frank Warren stating the fight would take place in Spring. On 3 April, the fight was announced as part of the undercard of Okelsandr Usyk vs. Rico Verhoeven, which was to take place in Giza, Egypt on 23 May, live on DAZN, with the vacant WBO super middleweight title at stake. At the press conference, Begic praised Sheeraz, saying, “Hamzah is a world-class talent and boxer. He’s the future of boxing… he will definitely be a world champion one day.” Despite that respect, Begic remained determined that he would cause an upset: “Saturday will be my moment to shine because I have worked so hard over the years to get the opportunity.” Begic was a +1000 underdog going into the fight. Sheeraz dismissed Begic’s chances, stating, “Everything I do, he won’t be able to handle.” On his deceptive appearance, he said, “Everyone is confident when they see me because I’m not really an intimidating-looking fella… but as soon as you get in the ring, it’s a different story.” Sheeraz weighed 167.9 pounds, with Begic, slightly lighter at 166.9 pounds. Having dominated the opening round, Sheeraz floored his opponent in the second with a left hook to his body and Begic was unable to beat the referee's count.

==== Sheeraz vs. Zachenhuber ====
On 26 June 2026, WBO president Gustavo Olivieri confirmed that Sheeraz was allowed to take a voluntary defence, with the sanctioning body’s rules giving a champion up to 180 days after winning a title to make a mandatory defence unless otherwise ordered. The news came less than a week after the WBO was set to order Sheeraz to defend his title against unbeaten Danish contender Jacob Bank. On 13 July, a 13-fight card for Anthony Joshua vs. Kristian Prenga was finalised for 25 July at the Jeddah Superdome in Saudi Arabia. Sheeraz was announced to defend his WBO title, in the co-feature bout against WBO #7 ranked Simon Zachenhuber (28–1, 19 KOs), with DAZN broadcasting the event globally. Zachenhuber was coming off a fifth-round stoppage victory over Armin Ajrulai on 27 June, meaning his WBO title challenge would take place within 30 days. Sheeraz defeated Zachenhuber by majority decision with two of the ringside judges scoring the fight 116–112 and 115–113 respectively in his favour, while the third had it a 114–114 draw. Sheeraz later revealed that he injured his right hand during either the second or third round after landing a punch on top of Zachenhuber's head.He underwent surgery following the fight.

==== Vacating WBO title ====
In August 2026, the WBO ordered Sheeraz to defend his title against former unified middleweight champion Janibek Alimkhanuly (17–0, 12 KOs). Despite never having fought at 168 pounds, Alimkhanuly was elevated to mandatory challenger status based on his ranking at middleweight, also describing him as a "first-time offender" with an "impeccable personal and professional record". The two parties were given 20 days to reach an agreement before a purse bid could be scheduled. Reacting to the announcement, Alimkhanuly wrote: "I can't wait for this fight" and stated he would "soon become a world champion in two divisions." The fight was originally ordered in 2024, when Sheeraz was the mandatory challenger for Alimkhanuly's WBO middleweight title. The fight never materialised and negotiations collapsed. Negotiations failed and a purse bid was scheduled for 16 September. Sheeraz stated that he was willing to defend his title against Alimkhanuly. He argued that Alimkhanuly had effectively bypassed other contenders but said he would proceed with the bout if the financial terms were acceptable, saying, "We're prize fighters, we fight for the right amount of money." He also stated his concern that the purse bid might not adequately reflect what he described as "the biggest fight of my career". Queensberry Promotions came up with the winning bid of $1,001,809, more than the $820,000, whoch came from the other only bidders, Top Rank, who promote Alimkhanuly. Alimkhanuly's manager Egis Klimas urged Sheeraz to take the fight. Sheeraz responded: "Brother if it was a 'huge fight,' Top Rank or yourself would have put up big numbers." Sheeraz was entitled to 75% of the winning bid ($751,357), with the remaining 25% ($250,452), going to Alimkhanuly. The proposed dates for the contest were 28 November or 5 December 2026, with London, Birmingham and New York suggested as potential venues. On 18 September, Sheeraz vacated the WBO title rather than fulfil his mandatory title defence. The WBO subsequently stated that he had "elected not to proceed with the contest" and had "voluntarily relinquished" the title.

== Professional boxing record ==
25 fights	24 wins	0 losses
By knockout	19	0
By decision	5	0
Draws	1	

No.	Result	Record	Opponent	Type	Round, time	Date	Location	Notes
25	Win	24–0–1	Simon Zachenhuber	MD	12	25 Jul 2026	Jeddah Superdome, Jeddah, Saudi Arabia	Retained WBO super middleweight title
24	Win	23–0–1	Alem Begić	KO	2 (12), 2:33	23 May 2026	Pyramids of Giza, Giza, Egypt	Won vacant WBO super middleweight title
23	Win	22–0–1	Edgar Berlanga	KO	5 (12), 0:17	12 Jul 2025	Louis Armstrong Stadium, New York City, New York, U.S.	
22	Draw	21–0–1	Carlos Adames	SD	12	22 Feb 2025	The Venue Riyadh Season, Riyadh, Saudi Arabia	For WBC middleweight title
21	Win	21–0	Tyler Denny	TKO	2 (12), 2:05	21 Sep 2024	Wembley Stadium, London, England	Retained WBC Silver and Commonwealth middleweight titles; Won European middleweight title
20	Win	20–0	Austin Williams	TKO	11 (12), 0:45	1 Jun 2024	Kingdom Arena, Riyadh, Saudi Arabia	Retained WBC Silver middleweight title
19	Win	19–0	Liam Williams	TKO	1 (12), 2:36	10 Feb 2024	Copper Box Arena, London, England	Retained WBC Silver and Commonwealth middleweight titles
18	Win	18–0	Dmytro Mytrofanov	TKO	2 (12), 0:35	26 Aug 2023	Stadion Wrocław, Wrocław, Poland	Retained WBC Silver middleweight title
17	Win	17–0	River Wilson-Bent	TKO	2 (12), 2:55	26 Nov 2022	The O2 Arena, London, England	Retained WBC Silver middleweight title; Won vacant Commonwealth middleweight title
16	Win	16–0	Francisco Emanuel Torres	TKO	5 (12), 1:56	16 Jul 2022	Copper Box Arena, London, England	Won vacant WBC Silver middleweight title
15	Win	15–0	Jez Smith	TKO	2 (10), 0:38	19 Mar 2022	Wembley Arena, London, England	Won vacant WBC International Silver middleweight title
14	Win	14–0	Bradley Skeete	TKO	9 (10), 0:58	4 Dec 2021	Copper Box Arena, London, England	Retained WBO European light-middleweight title
13	Win	13–0	Ezequiel Gurria	TKO	5 (10), 2:23	24 Jul 2021	Wembley Arena, London, England	Retained WBO European light-middleweight title
12	Win	12–0	Guido Nicolás Pitto	TKO	10 (10), 1:11	28 Nov 2020	Church House, London, England	Retained WBO European light-middleweight title
11	Win	11–0	Paul Kean	RTD	6 (10), 3:00	10 Jul 2020	BT Sport Studio, London, England	Retained WBO European light-middleweight title
10	Win	10–0	Ryan Kelly	TKO	6 (10), 2:58	30 Nov 2019	Arena Birmingham, Birmingham, England	Won vacant WBO European light-middleweight title
9	Win	9–0	Scott James	TKO	1 (8), 1:32	13 Jul 2019	The O2 Arena, London, England	
8	Win	8–0	Ladislav Nemeth	TKO	2 (6), 1:05	27 Apr 2019	Wembley Arena, London, England	
7	Win	7–0	Rod Douglas Jr.	TKO	1 (6), 1:10	8 Mar 2019	Royal Albert Hall, London, England	
6	Win	6–0	Jordan Grannum	PTS	6	15 Dec 2018	Brentwood Centre, Brentwood, England	
5	Win	5–0	Zygimantas Butkevicius	PTS	4	20 Oct 2018	Brentwood Centre, Brentwood, England	
4	Win	4–0	Miguel Aguilar	PTS	4	13 Jul 2018	York Hall, London, England	
3	Win	3–0	Chris Jenkinson	KO	1 (4), 1:57	6 Apr 2018	Thistle Hotel, London, England	
2	Win	2–0	Christian Hoskin-Gomez	PTS	4	24 Feb 2018	York Hall, London, England	
1	Win	1–0	Duane Green	TKO	2 (4), 1:28	16 Sep 2017	Copper Box Arena, London, England	

== See also ==
- List of male boxers
- List of world super-middleweight boxing champions

Sporting positions
Regional boxing titles
Vacant Title last held by Jama Saidi	WBO European light-middleweight champion 30 November 2019 – 2022; Vacated	Vacant Title next held by Slawa Spomer
Vacant Title last held by Magomed Madiev	WBC International Silver middleweight champion 19 March 2022 – 16 July 2022; Won Silver title	Vacant Title next held by Samuel Nmomah
Vacant Title last held by Sam Eggington	WBC Silver middleweight champion 16 July 2022 – 2024; Vacated	Vacant Title next held by Bilal Jkitou
Vacant Title last held by Felix Cash	Commonwealth middleweight champion 26 November 2022 – 2024; Vacated	Vacant Title next held by Kieron Conway
Preceded by Tyler Denny	European middleweight champion 21 September 2024 – 2024; Vacated	Vacant Title next held by Denzel Bentley
World boxing titles
Vacant Title last held by Terence Crawford	WBO super-middleweight champion 23 May – 18 September 2026; Vacated	Vacant
