= Gerome Warburton =

Welsh boxer (born 1995)

Personal information
- Nickname: Bread maker
- Born: 29 June 1995 (age 31) Bodelwyddan, Denbighshire, Wales
- Weight: Middleweight

Boxing career
- Stance: Southpaw

Boxing record
- Total fights: 23
- Wins: 18
- Win by KO: 2
- Losses: 3
- Draws: 2

Gerome Warburton (born 29 June 1995) is a Welsh professional boxer. He has held the WBA Continental middleweight title since March 2026. Warburton is also a former Welsh middleweight champion and has challenged for the British and Commonwealth titles in the same weight division.

== Career ==
A professional since 2019, Warburton won the vacant Welsh middleweight title with a 97–94 points win over Morgan Jones at LC2 in Swansea on 28 May 2022.

Almost exactly three years later on 17 May 2025, he challenged Commonwealth middleweight champion Kieron Conway at the Copper Box Arena in London, with the vacant British middleweight title also on the line. Warburton lost by stoppage in the fourth round.

Warburton was scheduled to face Nathan Heaney at Co-op Live Arena in Manchester on 24 January 2026. However, the fight was postponed when headliner, Moses Itauma, suffered an injury less than two weeks before the event, with the entire card being put back to take place at the same venue on 28 March 2026. When the bout eventually took place, Warburton won via unanimous decision claiming the vacant WBA Continental middleweight title in the process.

A rematch between Warburton and Heaney took place at bp pulse LIVE in Birmingham on 26 September 2026. Once again Warburton won by unanimous decision.

Warburton is scheduled to face WBC middleweight champion Carlos Adames in a non-title catchweight 10-round bout at The Venue in Riyadh, Saudi Arabia, on 14 November 2026. He lost via unanimous decision.
