= River Wilson-Bent =

British boxer (born 1994)

- Statistics
- Weight class: Middleweigjt
- Height: 6 ft 2 in (188 cm)
- Stance: orthodox
- Boxing record
- Total fights: 24
- Wins: 17
- Wins by KO: 41.18%
- Losses: 5
- Draws: 2

River Omari Wilson-Bent (born 15 January 1994) is a British former middleweight boxer who made his professional debut in 2018 and was known as "the Coventry Crusader".

== Personal life ==
Wilson-Bent was born in Coventry in 1994. He is a supporter of Coventry City F.C..

== Career ==
Wilson-Bent started boxing while a pupil at Nicholas Chamberlain School in Bedworth. He was trained by Brendan Norman and managed by Jon Pegg. He signed with promoter Mick Hennessy in 2021, and also works as a roofer.

Wilson-Bent won the vacant Midlands Area middleweigjt title in 2020, fighting against previously undefeated Troy Coleman. He defended his title against George Farrell in 2021, winning in the seventh round. 2021 also saw a draw in the English middleweight title fight against Tyler Denny. He lost a rematch against Denny on 25 June 2022, via split decision with two judges giving the bout in his opponent's favour 97–93 and 96–93 respectively, while the third scored it 96–94 for Wilson-Bent.

He was beaten by Hamzah Sheeraz in a second-round stoppage when fighting for the Commonwealth title and WBC silver belt in 2022. He beat Pavol Garaj, then was defeated by American boxer Austin Williams in 2023 by TKO. He challenged IBF European and WBO Global middleweight champion Shakiel Thompson at Park Community Arena in Sheffield on 27 September 2024, losing by stoppage in the third round. He also fought Tomasz Felsz and Matt McCallum in 2024, winning both fights.

Wilson-Bent announced his retirement from professional boxing in September 2025.
