= Kamil Szeremeta =

Polish boxer (born 1989)

Personal information
- Born: 11 October 1989 (age 36) Białystok, Poland
- Height: 5 ft 9 1/2 in (177 cm)
- Weight: Middleweight

Boxing career
- Stance: Orthodox

Boxing record
- Total fights: 31
- Wins: 26
- Win by KO: 9
- Losses: 3
- Draws: 2

Kamil Szeremeta (born 11 October 1989) is a Polish professional boxer who held the European middleweight title from 2018 to 2019. As of June 2020, he is ranked as the world's seventh best active middleweight by The Ring and eighth by the Transnational Boxing Rankings Board.

== Professional career ==
Szeremeta made his professional debut on 2 December 2012, scoring a four-round points decision (PTS) victory over Janos Lakatos at the OSiR Huragan Arena in Wołomin, Poland.

After compiling a record of 16–0 (2 KOs) he was due to face European middleweight champion, Emanuele Blandamura. After Blandamura relinquished the European title to face WBA (Regular) middleweight champion Ryōta Murata, Szeremeta faced Alessandro Goddi for the vacant European title on 23 February 2018 at the Palasport V.le Tiziano in Rome, Italy. Szeremeta defeated Goddi, capturing the title via second-round technical knockout (TKO).

He made two successful defences of the title – a tenth-round knockout (KO) against Ruben Diaz in September and a unanimous decision (UD) against Andrew Francillette in March 2019 – followed by an eight-round UD victory in a non-title fight against Edwin Palacios in July. Szeremeta was due to face mandatory challenger Matteo Signani, but chose to relinquish his European title in order to face Oscar Cortés in a final eliminator for the IBF middleweight title. The bout took place on 5 October 2019 at Madison Square Garden in New York City, as part of the undercard for the vacant IBF title fight between Gennady Golovkin and Sergiy Derevyanchenko. Szeremeta defeated Cortés via second-round TKO to set up a fight with Golovkin, who defeated Derevyanchenko to capture the IBF title.

The fight against Golovkin took place on 18 December 2020 in Hollywood, Florida, with Golovkin's IBF and IBO middleweight titles on the line. Szeremeta was unable to overcome the odds, and was dropped by his opponent four times over the course of the fight. After seven rounds, Szeremeta did not come out for the eighth, losing by seventh-round corner retirement and suffering his first professional loss.

On 19 June 2021, Szeremeta faced undefeated Jaime Munguía on short notice. Despite never being knocked down in the bout, Szeremeta was outgunned and could not match the damage that Munguía was inflicting. He suffered a second successive corner retirement loss, this time after six rounds.

== Professional boxing record ==
31 fights	26 wins	3 losses
By knockout	9	3
By decision	17	0
Draws	2	

No.	Result	Record	Opponent	Type	Round, time	Date	Location	Notes
31	Win	26–3–2	Boris Nedbal	TKO	4 (6), 1:57	4 Oct 2025	Nosalowy Dwór, Zakopane, Poland	
30	Loss	25–3–2	Chris Eubank Jr	KO	7 (12), 1:45	12 Oct 2024	Kingdom Arena, Riyadh, Saudi Arabia	For vacant IBO middleweight title
29	Draw	25–2–2	Abel Mina	UD	8	24 Feb 2024	Opera i Filharmonia Podlaska, Bialystok, Poland	
28	Win	25–2–1	Omir Rodriguez	UD	8	4 Nov 2023	Nosalowy Dwór, Zakopane, Poland	
27	Win	24–2–1	Nizar Trimech	RTD	3 (10), 3:00	5 Nov 2023	Opera i Filharmonia Podlaska, Bialystok, Poland	
26	Win	23–2–1	Vladyslav Gela	RTD	7 (8), 3:00	1 Oct 2022	MOSiR Hall, Lublin, Poland	
25	Win	22–2–1	Sasha Yengoyan	TKO	10 (10), 1:57	26 Mar 2022	Opera i Filharmonia Podlaska, Bialystok, Poland	
24	Draw	21–2–1	Nizar Trimech	MD	8	27 Nov 2021	Hala Widowiskowo, Ostroleka, Poland	
23	Loss	21–2	Jaime Munguía	RTD	6 (12), 3:00	19 Jun 2021	Don Haskins Center, El Paso, Texas, U.S.	For WBO Inter-Continental middleweight title
22	Loss	21–1	Gennady Golovkin	RTD	7 (12), 3:00	18 Dec 2020	Seminole Hard Rock Hotel & Casino, Hollywood, Florida, US	For IBF and IBO middleweight titles
21	Win	21–0	Oscar Cortés	TKO	2 (8), 0:45	5 Oct 2019	Madison Square Garden, New York City, New York, US	
20	Win	20–0	Edwin Palacios	UD	8	6 Jul 2019	Stadion Miejski, Rzeszów, Poland	
19	Win	19–0	Andrew Francillette	UD	12	9 Mar 2019	Palais du Littoral, Grande-Synthe, France	Retained European middleweight title
18	Win	18–0	Ruben Diaz	KO	10 (12), 2:58	22 Sep 2018	Hala Sportowa im. Olimpijczykow, Łomża, Poland	Retained European middleweight title
17	Win	17–0	Alessandro Goddi	TKO	2 (10)	23 Feb 2018	Palasport V.le, Rome, Italy	Won vacant European middleweight title
16	Win	16–0	Sebastian Skrzypczynski	UD	8	22 Apr 2017	Legionowo Arena, Legionowo, Poland	
15	Win	15–0	Jose Antonio Villalobos	UD	8	25 Feb 2017	Azoty Arena, Szczecin, Poland	
14	Win	14–0	Kassim Ouma	UD	10	20 Aug 2016	Amfiteatr, Międzyzdroje, Poland	
13	Win	13–0	Artem Karpets	RTD	5 (8), 3:00	20 Feb 2016	Legionowo Arena, Legionowo, Poland	
12	Win	12–0	Patrick Mendy	UD	8	26 Sep 2015	Atlas Arena, Łódź, Poland	
11	Win	11–0	Arthur Hermann	UD	10	22 Aug 2015	Amfiteatr, Międzyzdroje, Poland	
10	Win	10–0	Rafał Jackiewicz	UD	10	18 Apr 2015	Legionowo Arena, Legionowo, Poland	
9	Win	9–0	Jose Yebes	UD	8	5 Dec 2014	Kopalnia Soli, Wieliczka, Poland	
8	Win	8–0	Howard Cospolite	UD	8	18 Oct 2014	Nowy Dwór Mazowiecki, Poland	
7	Win	7–0	Lukasz Wawrzyczek	UD	8	26 Apr 2014	Legionowo Arena, Legionowo, Poland	
6	Win	6–0	Ivica Gogosevic	TKO	3 (6), 2:50	15 Mar 2014	Hotel Arłamów, Arłamów, Poland	
5	Win	5–0	Daniel Urbanski	UD	6	19 Oct 2013	Kolpania Soli, Wieliczka, Poland	
4	Win	4–0	Ismail Teboev	MD	6	29 Jun 2013	Amfiteatr, Ostróda, Poland	
3	Win	3–0	Robert Talarek	MD	4	18 May 2014	Legionowo Arena, Legionowo, Poland	
2	Win	2–0	Dzianas Makar	PTS	4	9 Dec 2012	Hala Sportowa, Białobrzegi, Poland	
1	Win	1–0	Janos Lakatos	PTS	4	2 Dec 2012	OSiR Huragan Arena, Wołomin, Poland	
