= Shakiel Thompson =

English boxer (born 1997)

Personal information
- Nickname: Dr Steel
- Born: 19 April 1997 (age 29) Sheffield, Yorkshire, England
- Height: 6 ft 3 in (191 cm)
- Weight: Middleweight

Boxing career
- Stance: Southpaw

Boxing record
- Total fights: 16
- Wins: 15
- Win by KO: 11
- Losses: 1

Shakiel Thompson (born 19 April 1997) is an English professional boxer. He has held the IBF European and WBO Global middleweight titles.

== Career ==
Thompson made his professional boxing debut at the DoubleTree Hilton Hotel in Sheffield on 12 October 2018, stopping Geiboord Omier just 42 seconds into the first of their scheduled four-round contest.

Having amassed a perfect record of 11 wins from 11 pro-fights, he claimed the vacant IBF European and WBO Global middleweight titles with an eighth round stoppage win over Bulgarian boxer Vladimir Georgiev at the Magna Centre in Rotherham on 20 April 2024.

Thompson made the first defense of his titles against River Wilson-Bent at Park Community Arena in Sheffield on 27 September 2024. He knocked his opponent to the canvas four times before the referee halted the bout in the third round.

Returning to Park Community Arena for his next outing, he stopped David Benitez in the fourth round of a non-title eight-round contest on 7 February 2025.

Fighting at the same venue for the third outing in a row in another non-title bout, Thompson stopped Grant Dennis in the second of their scheduled eight round match-up on 27 September 2025.

In October 2025, he signed with Frank Warren's Queensbury Promotions.

Thompson was scheduled to face Brad Pauls at Co-op Live in Manchester on 26 January 2026. However, the fight was postponed when headliner, Moses Itauma, suffered an injury less than two weeks before the event, with the entire card being put back to take place at the same venue on 28 March 2026. When the bout, which was for the vacant IBF International middleweight title, eventually took place, Thompson lost by stoppage in the ninth round to suffer his first defeat as a professional.
