= Jack Flatley =

English boxer (born 1994)

Personal information
- Nickname: Quiet Storm
- Born: 23 October 1994 (age 31) Bolton, Lancashire, England
- Height: 6 ft (183 cm)
- Weight: Super-welterweight, Middleweight

Boxing career
- Stance: Orthodox

Boxing record
- Total fights: 27
- Wins: 21
- Win by KO: 5
- Losses: 4
- Draws: 2

Jack Flatley (born 23 October 1994) is an English professional boxer. He is a former English super-welterweight champion and challenged for the European title in the same weight division.

== Career ==
Unbeaten in his first 15 professional fights, Flatley claimed the vacant English super-welterweight title thanks to a unanimous decision win over Craig Morris at De Vire Whites in Bolton on 11 May 2019.

Returning to the same venue on 28 September 2019, he lost his title in his first defense against Harry Scarff via unanimous decision.

On 3 December 2021, Flatley challenged European super-welterweight champion Kerman Lejarraga at Bilbao Arena in Spain, losing by knockout in the ninth round.

Moving up a weight division, he took on IBO International middleweight title holder Nathan Heaney at Manchester Arena on 24 September 2022 on the undercard of the Joe Joyce vs Joseph Parker heavyweight championship fight. Flatley lost on a technical unanimous decision after the contest was stopped in the fifth round on the advice of the ringside doctor when Heaney suffered a cut above his right eye caused by an accidental clash of heads.

A rematch took place at the International Centre in Telford on 25 March 2023. This time the bout went the full 10 rounds with Flatley losing by unanimous decision.
