= Kamran Sheeraz =

English cricketer

Personal information
- Full name: Kamran Pasha Sheeraz
- Born: 28 December 1973 (age 52); Wellington, Shropshire, England
- Batting: Right-handed
- Bowling: Right-arm medium-fast

Domestic team information
- Years: Team
- 1999: Shropshire
- 1997: Bedfordshire
- 1994/95: Rawalpindi B
- 1994–1997: Gloucestershire
- 1992: Bedfordshire

Career statistics
Competition	First-class	List A
Matches	13	23
Runs scored	27	13
Batting average	3.85	6.50
100s/50s	–/–	–/–
Top score	12*	9*
Balls bowled	1,717	923
Wickets	27	17
Bowling average	40.88	42.47
5 wickets in innings	2	–
10 wickets in match	1	–
Best bowling	6/67	2/17
Catches/stumpings	4/–	3/–
- Source: Cricinfo, 3 August 2011

Kamran Pasha Sheeraz (born 28 December 1973) is a former English cricketer. Sheeraz was a right-handed batsman who bowled right-arm medium-fast. He was born in Wellington, Shropshire.

== Cricket career ==
Sheeraz made his debut in county cricket for Bedfordshire against Suffolk in the 1992 MCCA Knockout Trophy. That season he also played 7 Minor Counties Championship matches. He later made his first-class debut for Gloucestershire against Northamptonshire in the 1994 County Championship. He made 12 further first-class appearances, the last of which came against Glamorgan in the 1997 County Championship. In his 13 first-class matches for the county, he took 27 wickets at an average of 40.88, with best figures of 6/67. These figures came against the touring West Indians in 1995, a match in which he also took 5/44 to give him is only 10 wicket haul in a match in his first-class career. He made his List A debut for Gloucestershire against Derbyshire in the 1994 AXA Equity & Law League. He made 19 further List A appearances for Gloucestershire, the last of which came against Pakistan A in 1997. In his 20 List A matches for the county, he took 13 wickets at an average of 50.07, with a best figures of 2/20. Following the end of the 1994 season, Sheeraz played for Rawalpindi B in Pakistan, making 2 List A appearances in the Willis Cup against Islamabad and United Bank Limited, taking 3 wickets in his 2 matches for the team.

With opportunities limited at Gloucestershire, he returned to Bedfordshire in 1997, appearing in a single Minor Counties Championship match against Northumberland, before leaving Gloucestershire at the end of the 1998 season. In 1999, he joined Shropshire, making his debut for the county against the Hampshire Cricket Board in the 1999 NatWest Trophy, which was his only List A appearance for Shropshire. In this match he took the wicket of Andrew Perry for the cost of 38 runs from 10 overs, while with the bat he was run out for a duck. He went on to make 2 appearances in the 1999 MCCA Knockout Trophy against the Derbyshire Cricket Board and Cheshire, before making 3 Minor Counties Championship appearances. He made no further Minor counties or List A appearances for Shropshire after this season.

== Personal life ==
Sheeraz is of Pakistani Muslim descent and his wife is of Indian Muslim descent. His paternal family belongs to the Janjua clan of Rajputs, originating in the village of Matore, in the Kahuta Tehsil of Rawalpindi District in Punjab, Pakistan. His son, Hamzah Sheeraz, is a professional boxer.
