= Vito Mielnicki Jr. =

American boxer (born 2002)

Personal information
- Nickname: White Magic
- Born: May 10, 2002 (age 24) Belleville, New Jersey, U.S.
- Height: 6 ft 0 in (183 cm)
- Weight: Welterweight; Light middleweight; Middleweight

Boxing career
- Reach: 70 in (178 cm)
- Stance: Orthodox

Boxing record
- Total fights: 26
- Wins: 24
- Win by KO: 13
- Losses: 1
- No contests: 1

Vito Mielnicki Jr. (born May 10, 2002) is an American professional boxer. As an amateur, Mielnicki was a four time Junior National Golden Gloves champion.

== Professional career ==
On July 13, 2019, Mielnicki made his professional debut against Tamarcus Smith. Mielnicki won the bout after knocking Smith out with a right hand, just over a minute into the opening round. Mielnicki second bout as a professional was against Caleb Bailey on September 20, 2019. Mielnicki secured victory after knocking his opponent down twice in the first round.

Mielnicki fought against Marklin Bailey on the undercard of Deontay Wilder vs. Luis Ortiz II on November 23, 2019. In the fourth round, Mielnicki landed a series of punches which caused Bailey to stumble backwards, causing referee Russell Mora to step in and end the bout. Mielnicki was taken the full distance for the first time in his professional career when he fought against Preston Wilson on January 18, 2020. Mielnicki was dominant throughout the bout and sealed victory after winning every round on each of the three scorecards.

Mielnicki's fifth bout as a professional was on the undercard of Deontay Wilder vs. Tyson Fury II against Corey Champion on February 22, 2020. Towards the end of the opening round, Mielnicki landed a flurry of punches which knocked his opponent down onto the canvas. Champion recovered from the knockdown, but despite this, Mielnicki proceeded to dominate the remainder of the fight and won via wide unanimous decision. On August 8, 2020, Mielnicki fought against Chris Rollins. In the second round, Mielnicki landed a heavy right hand which visibly hurt his opponent. Mielnicki proceeded to land several power shots until a final big right hand shot forced referee, Jerry Cantu, to step in and stop the bout in the second round.

Mielnicki was taken the full fight distance for the third time as a professional when he fought Steven Pulluaim on December 5, 2020. Mielnicki knocked his opponent down in both the first and second round, however, Pulluaim was able to recover from both knockdowns. Despite this, Mielnicki was declared the winner via comfortable unanimous decision. On February 27, 2021, Mielnicki fought against Noe Alejandro Lopez. Mielnicki controlled the bout from the outset, and in the second round managed to knock his opponent down with a right hand. Mielnicki secured victory in the third round after he landed a barrage of punches on Lopez which forced the referee to end the bout.

On April 17, 2021, Mielnicki suffered his first defeat as a professional in a bout against James Martin. Martin won via majority decision after outworking Mielnicki throughout the duration of the fight. On July 31, 2021, Mielnicki was due to face James Martin in an immediate rematch. It was announced on the day of the weigh-in that Martin would be unable to make the contracted weight, so Mielnicki would instead fight Noah Kidd. In the opening round, Mielnicki landed a left hook which knocked his opponent down. In the second round, Mielnicki continued to pressure Kidd and in the closing moments of the round, Mielnicki landed a combination of punches which forced his opponent to take a knee. This prompted the referee to step in and end the bout.

On December 25, 2021, Mielnicki fought against Nicholas DeLomba. During the third round, Mielnicki hurt DeLomba after landing a heavy right hand to the head of his opponent. After dominating the remainder of the bout, Mielnicki secured victory in the final round after hurting his opponent with another right hand, which resulted in the referee ending the bout upon the request of DeLomba’s trainer. Mielnicki fought against Dan Karpency on the undercard of Errol Spence Jr. vs. Yordenis Ugás on April 16, 2022. Mielnicki won via wide unanimous decision after controlling the duration of the bout.

On July 30, 2022, Mielnicki faced Jimmy Williams. In the sixth round, Mielnicki connected with a right hand which appeared to hurt his opponent. Towards the end of the sixth round, Williams' corner called an end to the bout in an effort to protect their fighter from sustaining further damage. On October 15, 2022, Mielnicki fought Limberth Ponce in a ten round bout. Mielnicki won via wide unanimous decision after outboxing his opponent throughout the course of the bout.

Mielnicki beat Ronald Cruz by unanimous decision at T-Mobile Arena in Las Vegas on May 4, 2024.

He defeated Laszlo Toth in a 10-round super-welterweight bout in Albuquerque, New Mexico, on August 10, 2024. Mielnicki won by disqualification when his opponent's corner men entered the ring in the second round.

Mielnicki beat Khalil El Harraz by majority decision in a 10-round super-welterweight bout at The Theater at Madison Square Garden in New York on September 27, 2024.

He faced Connor Coyle at Madison Square Garden in New York on 14 February 2025, for the vacant WBC-USNBC, IBF-USBA and WBO International middleweight titles. The 10-round bout ended in a majority draw, with one judge scoring it 96–94 in his favour, while the other two ruled it a 95–95 tie. In August 2025, it was announced that the fight had been ruled a no contest after Coyle failed a post-fight anti-doping test.

Mielnicki defeated Kamil Gardzielik by unanimous decision at the Prudential Center in Newark, New Jersey, on 21 June 2025.

He stopped Samuel Nmomah in the ninth round to win the vacant WBO Global middleweight title at the ANB Arena in Riyadh, Saudi Arabia, on 22 November 2025.

In December 2025, Mielnicki signed a promotional deal with Sampson Boxing.

He faced the previously unbeaten Omar Ulises Huerta over 10 rounds at Adrian Phillips Theater in Boardwalk Hall, Atlantic City, New Jersey, on 11 April 2026. Mielnicki won via unanimous decision.

In June 2026, Mielnicki signed a promotional contract with Eddie Hearn led Matchroom Boxing.

On 4 September 2026, he defeated Austin Williams by unanimous decision at the Prudential Center in Newark, New Jersey.

== Professional boxing record ==
26 fights	24 wins	1 loss
By knockout	13	0
By decision	11	1
No contests	1	

No.	Result	Record	Opponent	Type	Round, time	Date	Location	Notes
26	Win	24–1 (1)	Austin Williams	UD	10	Sep 4, 2026	Prudential Center, Newark, New Jersey, U.S.	Retained IBF-USBA, WBO Global and WBC Continental Americas middleweight titles
25	Win	23–1 (1)	Omar Ulises Huerta	UD	10	Apr 11, 2026	Boardwalk Hall, Atlantic City, New Jersey, U.S.	Retained IBF-USBA and WBO Global middleweight titles; Won vacant WBC Continental Americas middleweight title
24	Win	22–1 (1)	Samuel Nmomah	TKO	9 (10), 2:09	22 Nov 2025	ANB Arena, Riyadh, Saudi Arabia	Won vacant WBO Global middleweight title
23	Win	21–1 (1)	Kamil Gardzielik	UD	10	Jun 21, 2025	Prudential Center, Newark, New Jersey, U.S.	Won vacant WBC-USNBC, IBF-USBA, and IBO Americas middleweight titles
22	NC	20–1 (1)	Connor Coyle	NC	10	Feb 14, 2025	The Theater at Madison Square Garden, New York City, New York, U.S.	For vacant WBC-USNBC, IBF-USBA and WBO International middleweight titles; Originally a Majority Draw, later ruled an NC after Coyle failed a drug test
21	Win	20–1	Khalil El Harraz	MD	10	Sep 27, 2024	The Theater at Madison Square Garden, New York City, New York, U.S.	
20	Win	19–1	Laszlo Toth	DQ	2 (10), 1:39	Aug 10, 2024	Tingley Coliseum, Albuquerque, New Mexico, U.S.	
19	Win	18–1	Ronald Cruz	UD	10	May 4, 2024	T-Mobile Arena, Paradise, Nevada, U.S.	Won vacant WBC-USNBC light middleweight title
18	Win	17–1	Salim Larbi	KO	1 (10), 2:58	Dec 29, 2023	Prudential Center, New Jersey, U.S.	
17	Win	16–1	Alexis Salazar Flores	TKO	1 (10), 2:27	Nov 25, 2023	Michelob Ultra Arena, Paradise, Nevada, U.S.	Won vacant WBC Youth light middleweight title
16	Win	15–1	José Charles	KO	4 (10), 0:33	Apr 22, 2023	T-Mobile Arena, Paradise, Nevada, U.S.	
15	Win	14–1	Omar Rosales	TKO	4 (10), 0:26	Jan 7, 2023	Capital One Arena, Washington, D.C., U.S.	
14	Win	13–1	Limberth Ponce	UD	10	Oct 15, 2022	Barclays Center, New York City, New York, U.S.	
13	Win	12–1	Jimmy Williams	TKO	6 (8), 2:12	Jul 30, 2022	Barclays Center, New York City, New York, U.S.	
12	Win	11–1	Dan Karpency	UD	8	Apr 16, 2022	AT&T Stadium, Arlington, Texas, U.S.	
11	Win	10–1	Nicholas DeLomba	TKO	10 (10), 1:49	Dec 25, 2021	Prudential Center, Newark, New Jersey, U.S.	
10	Win	9–1	Noah Kidd	TKO	2 (8), 2:32	Jul 31, 2021	Prudential Center, Newark, New Jersey, U.S.	
9	Loss	8–1	James Martin	MD	8	Apr 17, 2021	Shrine Exposition Hall, Los Angeles, California, U.S.	
8	Win	8–0	Noe Alejandro Lopez	KO	3 (8), 2:50	Feb 27, 2021	Shrine Exposition Hall, Los Angeles, California, U.S.	
7	Win	7–0	Steven Pulluaim	UD	6	Dec 5, 2020	AT&T Stadium, Arlington, Texas, U.S.	
6	Win	6–0	Chris Rollins	KO	2 (8), 2:19	Aug 8, 2020	Microsoft Theater, Los Angeles, California, U.S.	
5	Win	5–0	Corey Champion	UD	4	Feb 22, 2020	MGM Grand Garden Arena, Paradise, Nevada, U.S.	
4	Win	4–0	Preston Wilson	UD	4	Jan 18, 2020	Liacouras Center, Philadelphia, Pennsylvania, U.S.	
3	Win	3–0	Marklin Bailey	TKO	2 (4), 2:31	Nov 23, 2019	MGM Grand Garden Arena, Paradise, Nevada, U.S.	
2	Win	2–0	Caleb Bailey	KO	1 (4), 1:54	Sep 20, 2019	La Hacienda Event Center, Midland, Texas, U.S.	
1	Win	1–0	Tamarcus Smith	KO	1 (4), 1:16	Jul 13, 2019	Prudential Center, Newark, New Jersey, U.S.	

Sporting positions
Regional boxing titles
Vacant Title last held by Oliver Meng	WBC Youth light middleweight champion Nov 25, 2023 – present	Incumbent
Vacant Title last held by Chordale Booker	WBC USA light middleweight champion May 4, 2024 – present	Incumbent
