= Linus Udofia =

English boxer (born 1993)

Personal information
- Nationality: English
- Born: 28 June 1993 (age 33) Akwa Ibom, Nigeria
- Weight: Middleweight

Boxing career
- Stance: Orthodox

Boxing record
- Total fights: 23
- Wins: 21
- Win by KO: 10
- Losses: 2

Linus Udofia (born 28 June 1993) is a Nigerian-born English former professional boxer. During his career he was a two-time English middleweight champion and also challenged for the British title in the same weight division.

== Career ==
Born in Akwa Ibom in Nigeria, Udofia moved to England with his family when he was aged eight. After an amateur career boxing out of Hockwell Ring ABC in Luton, he made his professional debut at York Hall in London on 19 March 2016, defeating Sonny Whiting on points in a four-round contest.

Unbeaten in his first 14 pro-fights, Udofia faced Tyler Denny for the vacant English middleweight title, again at York Hall, on 30 November 2019, winning the fight by majority decision with two of the ringside judges scoring the bout 97–94 and 96–94 respectively in his favour, while the third had it a 95–95 draw.

He successfully defended the title by stopping John Harding Jr in the ninth round at Marshall Arena in Milton Keynes on 4 October 2020.

Udofia vacated the title to pursue the British middleweight crown. He took on Denzel Bentley for the vacant championship at Indigo at The O2 in London on 13 May 2022, losing by split decision. One judge awarded the contest to Udofia by 115–114, but was overruled by his two colleagues who gave it to Bentley 115–113 and 116–112 respectively.

Having got back to winning ways with a six-round points victory over Robbie Chapman at York Hall on 25 March 2023, Udofia fought Kieron Conway for the vacant WBA Intercontinental title at Sheffield Arena on 7 October 2023. He lost when the referee halted the bout at the start of the sixth round on the advice of the ringside doctor due to one of his eyes being swollen shut.

Udofia became a two-time English middleweight champion thanks to a final round stoppage win over Dan Catlin in a contest for the vacant title at York Hall on 14 September 2024.

He successfully defended his title with a unanimous decision win over Constantine Williams at York Hall on 15 March 2025.

Udofia announced his retirement from professional boxing in August 2025, stating in a video posted on social media that his "love of boxing" had "waned massively" and saying: "I need to think about my health, you can't box half-heartedly, I've seen loads of people get hurt doing that - better to walk away now that my heart isn't in it." He added he intended to remain involved in the sport as a coach.
