= Endry José Pinto =

Venezuelan boxer (born 1991)

Personal information
- Born: 14 May 1991 (age 35) Ciudad Bolívar, Venezuela

Boxing career
- Stance: Orthodox

Boxing record
- Total fights: 20
- Wins: 17
- Win by KO: 14
- Losses: 2
- Draws: 1
Medal record
Representing Venezuela
Pan American Games
Bronze medal – third place	2015 Toronto	Middleweight

Endry José Saavedra Pinto (born 14 May 1991) is a Venezuelan professional boxer.

== Career ==
As an amateur he completed in the men's middleweight event at the 2016 Summer Olympics.

After turning professional in 2018, he won the vacant WBO Intercontinental middleweight title by defeating Issac Hardman via technical knockout in the eighth round at WIN Entertainment Centre in Wollongong, Australia, on 13 March 2024.

He fought Cesar Mateo Tapia for the vacant IBF International middleweight title at Caribe Royale in Orlando, Florida, USA, on 19 October 2024. The bout ended in a majority draw.

On 8 April 2025, he took on Mikkel Nielsen for the vacant WBO International middleweight title at Newcastle Entertainment Centre in Broadmeadow, Australia, winning by technical knockout in the eighth round.

He faced Denzel Bentley for the interim WBO middleweight title at The O2 Arena in London, England, on 4 April 2026, losing by stoppage in the seventh round.
