= Artem Karpets =

Polish boxer

Artem Karpets Артём Карпец
Personal information
- Nationality: Polish Ukrainian SSR, Soviet Union (now Ukraine)
- Born: Artem Karpets; March 7, 1984 (age 42) Kremenchug Ukraine
- Height: 1.82 m (6 ft 0 in)
- Weight: Middleweight Super Welterweight

Boxing career
- Stance: Orthodox

Boxing record
- Total fights: 37
- Wins: 21
- Win by KO: 6
- Losses: 16
- Draws: 0

Artem Karpets (born March 7, 1984) is a Polish professional boxer. Karpets was born in Kremenchug, Ukraine.

== Professional career ==
Karpets made his professional boxing debut on 21 October 2008 in Sportpalace Dinamo, Donetsk, Ukraine.

In April 2015 he won with Mariusz Biskupski, debut Poland.

== Professional record ==
21 Wins (6 knockouts), 9 Losses, 0 Draw
Result	Record	Opponent	Type	Rd., Time	Date	Location	Notes
Loss	21-9	(Poland) Robert Talarek	UD	8 (8)	2018-08-19	(Poland) Amfiteatr, Miedzyzdroje	
Loss	21-8	(Germany) Araik Marutjan	UD	6 (6)	2018-06-16	(Germany) Ballhaus Forum, Munich	
Loss	21-7	(Russia) Gennady Martirosyan	PTS	6 (6)	2017-11-11	(Germany) Werner-Seelenbinder-Sportpark, Neukoelln	
Loss	21-6	(Poland) Kamil Gardzielik	UD	6 (6)	2017-10-13	(Poland) Hala Sportowa, ul. Berlinga, Nowy Dwor Mazowiecki	
Loss	21-5	(Ukraine) Stanyslav Skorokhod	RTD	3 (8)	2017-04-27	(Ukraine) Caribbean Club, Kiev	
Loss	21-4	(France) Maxime Beaussire	TKO	5 (10)	2016-10-22	(France) Casino de Deauville, Deauville	
Loss	21-3	(Armenia) Sasha Yengoyan	RTD	4 (8), 3:00	2016-04-29	(Belgium) Topsporthal Vlaanderen, Ghent	
Loss	21-2	(Spain) Isaac Real	TD	4 (10)	2016-04-01	(Spain) Pabellón de la Vall d'Hebron, Barcelona	
Loss	21-1	(Poland) Kamil Szeremeta	RTD	5 (8), 3:00	2016-02-20	(Poland) Arena Legionowo, Legionowo	
Win	21–0	(Poland) Lukasz Janik	UD	6	2015-08-22	(Poland) Amfiteatr, Międzyzdroje	
Win	20–0	(Poland) Mariusz Biskupski	SD	6	2015-04-18	(Poland) Arena Legionowo, Legionowo	
Win	19–0	(Italy) Tobia Giuseppe Loriga	UD	12	2013-08-24	(Ukraine) Donbass Arena, Donetsk	Won vacant WBA Continental super welterweight title.
Win	18–0	(Hungary) Norbert Szekeres	UD	8	2013-04-05	(Ukraine) Sergey Bubka school of Olympic reserve, Donetsk	
