= Nathan Heaney =

English boxer (born 1989)

Personal information
- Nickname: Hitman
- Born: 4 April 1989 (age 37) Stoke-on-Trent, Staffordshire, England
- Height: 6 ft 1 in (185 cm)
- Weight: Middleweight, Super-middleweight

Boxing career
- Reach: 74 in (188 cm)
- Stance: Orthodox

Boxing record
- Total fights: 24
- Wins: 19
- Win by KO: 6
- Losses: 3
- Draws: 1
- No contests: 1

Nathan Heaney (born 4 April 1989) is an English former professional boxer. He held the British middleweight title between November 2023 and July 2024.

== Career ==
Having started boxing aged 11, Heaney turned professional in 2017, securing a points win over Daryl Sharp on his pro-debut at the Imperial Banqueting Suite in Bilston on 25 November that year.

In his seventh bout in the paid ranks, he claimed his first professional title by defeating Tom Stokes on points 96–94 for the vacant Midlands Area middleweight crown at King's Hall in Stoke on 21 June 2019.

Returning to the same venue and moving up a weight division, Heaney won the vacant IBO Continental super-middleweight title with a unanimous decision victory over Christian Schembri on 13 March 2020.

Back at middleweight, he stopped Sladan Janjanin in the seventh round to take the IBO Continental title in a second weight division at the Utilita Arena in Birmingham on 6 November 2021.

Despite being knocked down in the opening round, Heaney successfully defended his title with a unanimous decision win over Diego Ramirez at the International Centre in Telford on 16 April 2022.

He defended his title for the second time against Jack Flatley at Manchester Arena on 24 September 2022 on the undercard of the Joe Joyce vs Joseph Parker heavyweight championship fight. The contest was stopped in the fifth round on the advice of the ringside doctor when he suffered a cut above his right eye caused by an accidental clash of heads. Heaney was ahead on all three judges' scorecards at that point so was declared the winner by unanimous technical decision.

A rematch took place at the International Centre in Telford on 25 March 2023, with the vacant WBA Continental middleweight title on the line. This time the bout went the full 10 rounds and Heaney won by unanimous decision.

Unbeaten in his first 17 fights, he challenged British middleweight champion Denzel Bentley at Manchester Arena on 18 November 2023, claiming the title by majority decision with two of the ringside judges scoring the fight 117–111 and 116–113 respectively in his favour, while the third had it a 114–114 draw.

He made the first defense of his title on 16 March 2024 at Resorts World Arena in Birmingham against Brad Pauls. The bout ended in a split draw with one judge giving it 116–113 to Heaney, another favouring Pauls by 115–114 and the third seeing the contest as a 114–114 tie.

The fighters met in a rematch at the same venue on 20 July 2024. Heaney was knocked to the canvas in the fourth round and, although he recovered to continue the fight, he was stopped in the final round to lose his title and unbeaten record.

In January 2025, he was inducted into the Stoke-on-Trent Sporting Hall of Fame.

Heaney faced Sofiane Khati for the vacant WBA Continental middleweight title at Co-op Live Arena in Manchester on 8 February 2025, losing by stoppage in the seventh round. The fight was later declared a no contest due to Khati failing a post-bout anti-doping test and being given a three-month suspension after carboxy-THC was found in his urine sample. Meanwhile, Heaney returned to the ring against Grant Dennis at King's Hall in Stoke on 26 July 2025. He won the eight-round contest on points.

He was scheduled to face Gerome Warburton at Co-op Live Arena in Manchester on 24 January 2026. However, the fight was postponed when headliner, Moses Itauma, suffered an injury less than two weeks before the event, with the entire card being put back to take place at the same venue on 28 March 2026. When the bout, which was for the vacant WBA Continental middleweight title, eventually took place, Heaney lost via unanimous decision.

In August 2026, Heaney announced that he would retire from professional boxing after facing Warburton in a rematch at bp pulse LIVE in Birmingham on 26 September 2026. In a repeat of their first fight, Heaney lost by unanimous decision.

== Ring walk ==
During his professional career, Heaney used "Delilah" by Tom Jones as his ring walk music in tribute to his hometown football club, Stoke City, whose supporters had adopted it as their unofficial anthem. A social media post of Heaney and his fans singing the song during his walk to the ring for a fight at King's Hall in Stoke in 2020 went viral and played a part in him gaining a promotional contract with Frank Warren. Subsequently Heaney's ring walk became known as among the best in boxing.

== Professional boxing record ==
24 fights	19 wins	3 losses
By knockout	6	1
By decision	13	2
Draws	1	
No contests	1	

No.	Result	Record	Opponent	Type	Round, time	Date	Location	Notes
24	Loss	19–3–1 (1)	Gerome Warburton	UD	10	26 Sep 2026	bp pulse LIVE, Birmingham, England	For WBA Continental middleweight title
23	Loss	19–2–1 (1)	Gerome Warburton	UD	10	28 Mar 2026	Co-op Live, Manchester, England	For vacant WBA Continental middleweight title
22	Win	19–1–1 (1)	Grant Dennis	PTS	8	26 Jul 2025	King's Hall, Stoke-on-Trent, England	
21	NC	18–1–1 (1)	Sofiane Khati	NC	7 (10), 1:08	8 Feb 2025	Co-op Live, Manchester, England	Inaugural WBA Continental (Europe) middleweight title at stake; Originally a TKO win for Khati, overturned due to a failed dope test
20	Loss	18–1–1	Brad Pauls	TKO	12 (12), 0:54	20 Jul 2024	bp pulse LIVE, Birmingham, England	Lost British and WBA Continental middleweight titles
19	Draw	18–0–1	Brad Pauls	SD	12	16 Mar 2024	bp pulse LIVE, Birmingham, England	Retained British middleweight title
18	Win	18–0	Denzel Bentley	MD	12	18 Nov 2023	Manchester Arena, Manchester, England	Won British middleweight title
17	Win	17–0	Jack Flatley	UD	10	25 Mar 2023	Telford International Centre, Telford, England	Won vacant WBA Continental middleweight title
16	Win	16–0	Jack Flatley	TD	5 (10), 2:05	24 Sep 2022	Manchester Arena, Manchester, England	Retained IBO International middleweight title; Unanimous TD: Heaney cut from accidental head clash
15	Win	15–0	Diego Ramírez	UD	10	16 Apr 2022	Telford International Centre, Telford, England	Retained IBO International middleweight title
14	Win	14–0	Slađan Janjanin	TKO	7 (10), 2:48	6 Nov 2021	Utilita Arena Birmingham, Birmingham, England	Won vacant IBO International middleweight title
13	Win	13–0	Konstantin Aleksandrov	KO	5 (10), 1:36	28 Aug 2021	Utilita Arena Birmingham, Birmingham, England	
12	Win	12–0	Iliyan Markov	KO	3 (10), 2:13	5 Jun 2021	Telford International Centre, Telford, England	
11	Win	11–0	Ryan Oliver	PTS	10	27 Feb 2021	Copper Box Arena, London, England	
10	Win	10–0	Christian Schembri	UD	10	13 Mar 2020	King's Hall, Stoke-on-Trent, England	Won vacant IBO Continental and BFP super middleweight titles
9	Win	9–0	Nelson Altamirano	TKO	5 (6), 2:02	30 Nov 2019	Utilita Arena Birmingham, Birmingham, England	
8	Win	8–0	Serge Ambomo	PTS	10	12 Oct 2019	King's Hall, Stoke-on-Trent, England	
7	Win	7–0	Tom Stokes	PTS	10	21 Jun 2019	King's Hall, Stoke-on-Trent, England	Won vacant Midlands Area middleweight title
6	Win	6–0	Daniel Urbański	PTS	8	13 Apr 2019	King's Hall, Stoke-on-Trent, England	
5	Win	5–0	Martin Kabrhel	TKO	1 (6), 2:41	10 Oct 2018	King's Hall, Stoke-on-Trent, England	
4	Win	4–0	Patryk Buczek	PTS	4	13 Jul 2018	King's Hall, Stoke-on-Trent, England	
3	Win	3–0	Sean Gorman	TKO	3 (4), 2:02	12 May 2018	Bolton Whites Hotel (De Vere Whites), Bolton, England	
2	Win	2–0	Emmanuel Moussinga	PTS	4	17 Mar 2018	King's Hall, Stoke-on-Trent, England	
1	Win	1–0	Darryl Sharp	PTS	4	25 Nov 2017	Imperial Banqueting Suite, Bilston, England	

== Personal life ==
A qualified teacher, Heaney was a college lecturer before focusing on boxing full-time.
