= Steve Rolls =

Canadian boxer

Personal information
- Born: Hamilton, Ontario, Canada
- Height: 5 ft 10 in (1.78 m)
- Weight: Light middleweight; Middleweight; Super middleweight

Boxing career
- Stance: Orthodox

Boxing record
- Total fights: 26
- Wins: 22
- Win by KO: 12
- Losses: 4

Steve Rolls is a Canadian professional boxer.

== Career ==
=== Amateur career ===
Steve Rolls was on the 2009 and 2010 Canadian National Boxing Team. In his amateur career he had an 83–14 record. In September 2009, Rolls went to the 2009 International Boxing Association (AIBA) Men's Boxing Championship in Milan, Italy. He won his first 2 matches, against Georgia's Levan Guledani and Italy's Luca Podda, before losing in the round of 16 against 2008 Olympic bronze medalist Vijender Singh of India. This gave Rolls the rank of No. 12 in the world.

== Professional boxing record ==
26 fights	22 wins	4 losses
By knockout	12	2
By decision	10	2

No.	Result	Record	Opponent	Type	Round, time	Date	Location	Notes
25	Loss	22–4	Steven Butler	KO	1 (10), 1:05	7 Mar 2024	Montreal Casino, Montreal, Quebec, Canada	
24	Loss	22–3	Austin Williams	UD	10	23 Sep 2023	Caribe Royale Orlando, Orlando, Florida, U.S.	Lost IBF North American middleweight title
23	Win	22–2	Shady Gamhour	UD	10	21 Jul 2022	Rebel Entertainment Complex, Toronto, Ontario, Canada	Won vacant IBF North American middleweight title
22	Loss	21–2	Edgar Berlanga	UD	10	19 Mar 2022	Madison Square Garden, New York City, New York, U.S.	
21	Win	21–1	Christopher Brooker	TKO	9 (10), 1:32	17 Dec 2021	Bell Centre, Montreal, Quebec, Canada	
21	Win	20–1	Gilberto Pereira dos Santos	TKO	4 (12), 2:00	28 Jan 2020	Danforth Music Hall, Toronto, Ontario, Canada	
20	Loss	19–1	Gennady Golovkin	KO	4 (12), 2:09	8 Jun 2019	Madison Square Garden, New York City, New York, U.S.	
19	Win	19–0	KeAndrae Leatherwood	UD	10	15 Dec 2018	Coca-Cola Coliseum, Toronto, Ontario, Canada	Won vacant USBA middleweight title
18	Win	18–0	Damian Ezequiel Bonelli	UD	8	18 Apr 2018	Fairmont Royal York, Toronto, Ontario, Canada	
17	Win	17–0	Andrik Saralegui	TKO	3 (8), 2:17	28 Oct 2017	Foxwoods Resort Casino, Ledyard, Connecticut, U.S.	
16	Win	16–0	Demond Nicholson	SD	8	9 Jun 2017	Turning Stone Resort Casino, Verona, New York, U.S.	
15	Win	15–0	Attila Koros	TKO	3 (8), 2:55	16 Dec 2016	Amphithéâtre Cogeco, Trois-Rivières, Quebec, Canada	
14	Win	14–0	Emmanuel Sanchez	RTD	5 (8), 3:00	3 Jun 2016	Resorts World Casino, New York City, New York, U.S.	
13	Win	13–0	Steed Woodall	TKO	4 (8), 2:26	11 Dec 2015	Bayou Event Center, Houston, Texas, U.S.	Won vacant NABF super welterweight title
12	Win	12–0	Tyi Edmonds	UD	8	19 Sep 2015	Resorts World Casino, New York City, New York, U.S.	
11	Win	11–0	Jozsef Kormany	TKO	3 (6), 0:35	20 Mar 2015	Shaw Conference Centre, Edmonton, Alberta, Canada	
10	Win	10–0	Norbert Szekeres	UD	6	31 May 2014	Vaudreuil Arena, Vaudreuil-Dorion, Quebec, Canada	
9	Win	9–0	Jaudiel Zepeda	UD	6	8 Mar 2014	Lions Arena, Spryfield, Nova Scotia, Canada	
8	Win	8–0	Emmanuel Guzman	KO	5 (6), 1:41	26 Oct 2013	Zone Portuaire, Saguenay, Quebec, Canada	
7	Win	7–0	Gyorgy Marosi	UD	6	24 Aug 2013	Africville Park, Halifax, Nova Scotia, Canada	
6	Win	6–0	Ferenc Zold	KO	4 (6), 0:24	21 Jun 2013	CCSE Maisonneuve, Montreal, Quebec, Canada	
5	Win	5–0	Tim Valdez	TKO	3 (4), 2:02	26 Apr 2013	World Trade and Convention Centre, Halifax, Nova Scotia, Canada	
4	Win	4–0	Simon Ruvalcaba	TKO	4 (4), 1:07	22 Mar 2013	Ogden Marriott, Ogden, Utah, U.S.	
3	Win	3–0	Ahmad Selemani	UD	4	8 Feb 2013	Bell Centre, Montreal, Quebec, Canada	
2	Win	2–0	Matt Heim	TKO	1 (4), 1:41	2 Jun 2012	Shediac Multi-Purpose Centre, Shediac, New Brunswick, Canada	
1	Win	1–0	Paul Bzdel	UD	4	8 Apr 2011	Shaw Conference Centre, Edmonton, Alberta, Canada	
