= Emanuele Blandamura =

Italian boxer (born 1979)

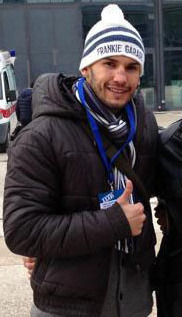
- Blandamura in 2013

Personal information
- Nickname: Sioux
- Nationality: Italian
- Born: Emanuele Felice Blandamura; 19 December 1979 (age 46) Udine, Friuli-Venezia Giulia, Italy
- Height: 1.78 m (5 ft 10 in)
- Weight: Middleweight

Boxing career
- Stance: Orthodox

Boxing record
- Total fights: 33
- Wins: 29
- Win by KO: 5
- Losses: 4

Emanuele Felice Blandamura (born 19 December 1979) is an Italian professional boxer. He held the European Union middleweight title in 2014, the European middleweight title from 2016 to 2018, and has challenged once for a world title in 2018.

== Professional career ==
Blandamura made his professional debut on 29 April 2007, scoring a second-round stoppage against Alex Herceg, who also debuted. On 16 June 2012, Blandamura won his first major regional championship—the vacant WBC Silver International middleweight title—by stopping Luca Tassi in ten rounds. This was followed up on 25 January 2014, when Blandamura defeated Marcos Nader via twelve-round split decision (SD) to win the European Union middleweight title.

On 26 July 2014, Blandamura suffered his first career loss to Billy Joe Saunders, who knocked him out in eight rounds to win the vacant European middleweight title. A second chance for Blandamura to win the title, which Saunders later vacated, came on 20 June 2015. This time, Blandamura was knocked out in the eighth round by Michel Soro. On 3 December 2016, Blandamura won the vacant European middleweight title on his third attempt, winning an SD over Matteo Signani.

== Professional boxing record ==
32 fights	28 wins	4 losses
By knockout	5	4
By decision	21	0
By disqualification	2	0

No.	Result	Record	Opponent	Type	Round, time	Date	Location	Notes
33	Loss	29–4	Marcus Morrison	TKO	9 (10), 2:44	11 Jul 2019	Stadio Nicola Pietrangeli, Rome, Italy	For vacant WBC International Silver middleweight title
32	Win	29–3	Nikola Matic	PTS	6	17 Nov 2018	Tuscany Hall, Florence, Italy	
31	Win	28–3	Giorgi Gujejiani	UD	6	17 Nov 2018	Palaboxe Aurelio Santoro, Rome, Italy	
30	Loss	27–3	Ryōta Murata	TKO	8 (12), 2:56	15 Apr 2018	Yokohama Arena, Yokohama, Japan	For WBA (Regular) middleweight title
29	Win	27–2	Alessandro Goddi	UD	12	17 Jun 2017	Casino de la Vallée, Saint-Vincent, Italy	Retained European middleweight title
28	Win	26–2	Matteo Signani	SD	12	3 Dec 2016	Palazzetto dello Sport, Colleferro, Italy	Won vacant European middleweight title
27	Win	25–2	Goran Milenkovic	PTS	6	30 Apr 2016	Palazzetto dello Sport, Fiumicino, Italy	
26	Win	24–2	Mugurel Sebe	PTS	6	10 Oct 2015	Palazzetto dello Sport, Rome, Italy	
25	Loss	23–2	Michel Soro	KO	8 (12)	20 Jun 2015	Teatro Principe, Milan, Italy	For vacant European middleweight title
24	Win	23–1	Matiouze Royer	PTS	6	20 Dec 2014	Palazzetto dello Sport, Rome, Italy	
23	Loss	22–1	Billy Joe Saunders	KO	8 (12), 2:58	26 Jul 2014	Phones 4u Arena, Manchester, England	For vacant European middleweight title
22	Win	22–0	Marcos Nader	SD	12	25 Jan 2014	Hanns-Martin-Schleyer-Halle, Stuttgart, Germany	Won European Union middleweight title
21	Win	21–0	Ruslans Pojonisevs	PTS	6	22 Nov 2013	Palazzetto dello Sport, Frontino, Italy	
20	Win	20–0	Andrejs Loginovs	UD	6	6 Jul 2013	Stadio Giovanni Maria Fattori, Civitavecchia, Italy	
19	Win	19–0	Zoltan Surman	TKO	4 (6)	22 Feb 2013	Palazzetto dello Sport, Montalto di Castro, Italy	
18	Win	18–0	Jevgenijs Andrejevs	UD	6	15 Dec 2012	PalaGarda, Riva del Garda, Italy	
17	Win	17–0	Luca Tassi	TKO	10 (12), 1:14	16 Jun 2012	Stabilimento Oasi, Rome, Italy	Won vacant WBC Silver International middleweight title
16	Win	16–0	Manuel Ernesti	UD	12	7 Oct 2011	Palafijlkam, Rome, Italy	Won vacant WBC Mediterranean middleweight title
15	Win	15–0	Sandor Ramocsa	PTS	6	3 Jun 2011	Pomezia, Italy	
14	Win	14–0	Sergejs Savrinovics	PTS	6	27 Apr 2011	Rome, Italy	
13	Win	13–0	Pavels Lotahs	PTS	6	17 Dec 2010	Palazzetto dello Sport, Rome, Italy	
12	Win	12–0	Robert Blazo	PTS	8	30 Jul 2010	Pomezia, Italy	
11	Win	11–0	Janos Varga	TKO	5 (6)	5 Feb 2010	PalaTenda, Fuscaldo, Italy	
10	Win	10–0	Virgil Meleg	PTS	6	20 Jun 2009	Cesano, Italy	
9	Win	9–0	Ferenc Olah	DQ	2 (4)	16 May 2009	Il Gran Teatro, Rome, Italy	
8	Win	8–0	Fares Sahawneh	PTS	6	13 Dec 2008	Palasport, Maclodio, Italy	
7	Win	7–0	Francesco Di Fiore	SD	6	5 Jul 2008	Palazzetto dello Sport, Fiumicino, Italy	
6	Win	6–0	Armend Tatari	PTS	6	14 Feb 2008	Palazzetto dello Sport, Fiumicino, Italy	
5	Win	5–0	Abdelouahed Ben Lelly	UD	6	14 Dec 2007	PalaLottomatica, Rome, Italy	
4	Win	4–0	Florin Bogdan	PTS	6	12 Oct 2007	Nuvolera, Italy	
3	Win	3–0	Florin Oanea	DQ	5 (6)	21 Jul 2007	Paratico, Italy	
2	Win	2–0	Michal Durovic	TKO	4 (6)	22 Jun 2007	Colosseo, Rome, Italy	
1	Win	1–0	Alex Herceg	TKO	2 (6)	29 Apr 2007	Palasport, Piacenza, Italy	

Sporting positions
Regional boxing titles
Preceded by Manuel Ernesti	WBC Mediterranean middleweight champion 7 October 2011 – November 2011; Vacated	Vacant Title next held by Goekalp Oezekler
Preceded by Marcos Nader	WBC Silver International middleweight champion 16 June 2014 – June 2013; Vacated	Vacant Title next held by Nick Brinson
Vacant Title last held by Predrag Radosevic	European Union middleweight champion 25 January 2014 – May 2014; Vacated	Vacant Title next held by Matteo Signani
Vacant Title last held by Michel Soro	European middleweight champion 3 December 2016 – February 2018; Vacated	Vacant Title next held by Kamil Szeremeta
