= Brad Pauls =

English boxer (born 1993)

Personal information
- Nickname: The Newquay Bomb
- Born: 11 April 1993 (age 33) Newquay, Cornwall, England
- Height: 5 ft 10 in (178 cm)
- Weight: Middleweight

Boxing career
- Stance: Orthodox

Boxing record
- Total fights: 25
- Wins: 21
- Win by KO: 12
- Losses: 3
- Draws: 1

Brad Pauls (born 11 April 1993) is an English professional boxer who is a former British middleweight champion. He has also held the English and IBF International middleweight titles as well as challengeling for the European championship in the same weight division.

== Career ==
A professional since 2015, Pauls won the vacant English middleweight title on 23 September 2023, thanks to an eighth round stoppage of Mitchell Frearson at York Hall in London.

In his next fight he challenged British middleweight champion Nathan Heaney at Resorts World Arena in Birmingham on 16 March 2024. The bout ended in a split draw with one ringside judge giving it 115–114 to Pauls, another favouring Heaney by 116–113 and the third seeing the contest as a 114–114 tie.

A rematch took place at the same venue on 20 July 2024. Pauls knocked Heaney to the canvas in the fourth round and then stopped him in the final round to claim the title.

Pauls lost the championship in his first defence against Denzel Bentley via unanimous decision at Wembley Arena in London on 17 December 2024, in a fight which was also for the vacant European title.

Pauls was scheduled to face Shakiel Thompson at Co-op Live in Manchester on 26 January 2026. However, the fight was postponed when headliner, Moses Itauma, suffered an injury less than two weeks before the event, with the entire card being put back to take place at the same venue on 28 March 2026. When the bout eventually took place, Pauls won by stoppage in the ninth round to claim the vacant IBF International middleweight title in the process.

He made the first defense of his title against Bradley Goldsmith at St Mary's Stadium in Southampton on 20 June 2026. Pauls was knocked down in the sixth round and, although he got to his feet and went on to finish the 10-round fight, he lost via unanimous decision.

== Personal life ==
Pauls studied fitness and personal training at Southampton Solent University.
