= Austin Williams (boxer) =

American boxer (born 1996)

Personal information
- Nickname: Ammo
- Born: May 3, 1996 (age 30) Milwaukee, Wisconsin, U.S.
- Height: 6 ft (183 cm)
- Weight: Middleweight

Boxing career
- Stance: Orthodox

Boxing record
- Total fights: 23
- Wins: 20
- Win by KO: 13
- Losses: 3

Austin Williams (born May 3, 1996) is an American professional boxer. He challenged for the WBC middleweight title in 2026.

== Early life ==
Born in Milwaukee Williams revealed he had a wonderful childhood and participated in sports. Many of his friends used sports as a lifestyle. Traveled back and forth to Chicago where he continued basketball. he suddenly moved to Texas and started boxing at 19.

== Amateur career ==
Williams started boxing at the age of 19 and had 47 amateur bouts. Williams was a two-time USA Boxing Western Regional Champion, a two-time Houston Golden Gloves Champion and named Gulf Association's Most Outstanding Boxer in 2017.

== Professional career ==
Notable wins of Williams early career were against Kieron Conway and River Wilson-Bent.

=== Williams vs. Rolls ===
Williams claimed the second belt of his pro career against Canadian Steve Rolls. He won on points to claim the IBF North American belt.

=== Williams vs. Sheeraz ===
Williams suffered the first loss of his career against WBC Silver middleweight champion Hamzah Sheeraz as part of the Matchroom vs Queensberry card in Saudi Arabia. Despite Ammo having a lot of success he was outboxed by Sheeraz and dropped in the 10th round and stopped in the 11th.

=== Williams vs. Oliha ===
Williams was scheduled to face Etinosa Oliha in an eliminator for IBF middleweight title in Frisco, TX, on July 19, 2025. Oliha withdrew after an eye issue was identified during his pre-fight medical. Williams defeated replacement opponent, Ivan Vazquez, by stoppage in the ninth round.

=== Williams vs. Toussaint ===
Williams was due to challenge WBC middleweight title holder Carlos Adames at Madison Square Garden on January 31, 2026, but the fight was cancelled when the champion fell ill the day before the fight. Instead Williams faced replacement opponent, Wendy Toussaint, winning by unanimous decision.

=== Williams vs. Adames ===
Williams finally got his chance at a world title when he fought WBC middleweight champion Carlos Adames at Caribe Royale in Orlando, Florida, on March 21, 2026, but he lost via unanimous decision.

=== Williams vs. Mielnicki Jr. ===
On September 4, 2026, Williams challenged IBF-USBA, WBO Global and WBC Continental Americas middleweight champion Vito Mielnicki Jr. at the Prudential Center in Newark, New Jersey, losing by unanimous decision.

== Professional boxing record ==
23 fights	20 wins	3 losses
By knockout	13	1
By decision	7	2

No.	Result	Record	Opponent	Type	Round, time	Date	Location	Notes
23	Loss	20–3	Vito Mielnicki Jr.	UD	10	Sep 4, 2026	Prudential Center, Newark, New Jersey, U.S.	For IBF-USBA, WBO Global and WBC Continental Americas middleweight titles
22	Loss	20–2	Carlos Adames	UD	12	Mar 21, 2026	Caribe Royale, Orlando, Florida, U.S	For WBC middleweight title
21	Win	20–1	Wendy Toussaint	UD	10	Jan 31, 2026	Madison Square Garden, New York City, New York, U.S.	
20	Win	19-1	Ivan Vazquez	TKO	9 (10), 0:36	Jul 19, 2025	The Ford Center at The Star, Frisco, Texas, U.S	
19	Win	18-1	Patrice Volny	UD	12	Mar 15, 2025	Caribe Royale, Orlando, Florida, U.S	
18	Win	17–1	Gian Garrido	TKO	5 (8), 1:04	Nov 2, 2024	Wells Fargo Center, Philadelphia, Pennsylvania, U.S.	
17	Loss	16–1	Hamzah Sheeraz	TKO	11 (12), 0:45	Jun 1, 2024	Kingdom Arena, Riyadh, Saudi Arabia	For WBC Silver middleweight title
16	Win	16–0	Armel Mbumba-Yassa	KO	7 (10), 2:52	Feb 3, 2024	The Cosmopolitan of Las Vegas, Paradise, Nevada, U.S.	
15	Win	15–0	Steve Rolls	UD	10	Sep 23, 2023	Caribe Royale, Orlando, Florida, U.S.	For IBF North American middleweight title
14	Win	14–0	River Wilson-Bent	TKO	8 (10), 1:01	Apr 1, 2023	The O2 Arena, London, England	
13	Win	13–0	Simon Madsen	UD	10	Dec 3, 2022	Gila River Arena, Glendale, Arizona, U.S.	
12	Win	12–0	Kieron Conway	UD	10	Sep 17, 2022	T-Mobile Arena, Paradise, Nevada, U.S.	
11	Win	11–0	Chordale Booker	TKO	1 (10), 2:25	Apr 30, 2022	Madison Square Garden, New York, New York, U.S.	
10	Win	10–0	Javier Francisco Maciel	TKO	6 (8), 1:02	Feb 12, 2022	Alexandra Palace, London, England	
9	Win	9–0	Quatavious Cash	TKO	2 (8), 0:26	Dec 4, 2021	MGM Grand Garden Arena, Paradise, Nevada, U.S.	
8	Win	8–0	Denis Douglin	UD	8	Mar 13, 2021	American Airlines Center, Dallas, Texas, U.S.	
7	Win	7–0	Isiah Jones	TKO	1 (6), 1:29	Dec 19, 2020	Alamodome, San Antonio, Texas, U.S.	
6	Win	6–0	Esau Herrera de la Cruz	TKO	5 (6)	Oct 23, 2020	Gimnasio TV Azteca, Mexico City, Mexico	
5	Win	5–0	Donald Sanchez	TKO	4 (6), 2:51	Jan 30, 2020	Meridian at Island Gardens, Miami, Florida, U.S.	
4	Win	4–0	Miroslav Juna	PTS	4	Oct 26, 2019	The O2 Arena, London, England	
3	Win	3–0	Jabrandon Harris	KO	1 (4), 1:51	Jul 27, 2019	College Park Center, Arlington, Texas, U.S.	
2	Win	2–0	Quadeer Jenkins	TKO	1 (4), 2:14	Jun 1, 2019	Madison Square Garden, New York City, New York, U.S.	
1	Win	1–0	Joel Guevara	KO	1 (4), 2:06	Apr 26, 2019	The Forum, Inglewood, California, U.S.	
