= Siphiwe Lusizi =

South African boxer (born 1989)

Medal record

Men's boxing

Representing South Africa

All-Africa Games
Bronze medal – third place	2011 Maputo	Welterweight

Siphiwe Lusizi (born August 5, 1989 in Mdantsane) is a South African boxer. At the 2012 Summer Olympics, he competed in the Men's welterweight, and defeated Ahmad Abdul-Karim of Iraq on points, but was defeated in the second round by Gabriel Maestre of Venezuela.

At the 2014 Commonwealth Games, he competed in the men's middleweight (75 kg) division. He beat Imrod Bartholomew and Eric Finau before losing to Northern Ireland's Connor Coyle in the quarterfinals.
