= Canelo Álvarez vs. Gennady Golovkin III =

2022 boxing match

The Trilogy
- Date: September 17, 2022
- Venue: T-Mobile Arena; Paradise, Nevada, United States
- Title(s) on the line: WBA (Super), WBC, IBF, WBO, IBO, TBRB, and The Ring undisputed super middleweight titles

Tale of the tape
Boxer	Saúl Álvarez	Gennady Golovkin
Nickname	Canelo ("Cinnamon")	GGG
Hometown	Guadalajara, Jalisco, Mexico	Karaganda, Karaganda Region, Kazakhstan
Pre-fight record	57–2–2 (39 KO)	42–1–1 (37 KO)
Age	32 years, 1 month	40 years, 5 months
Height	5 ft 8 in (173 cm)	5 ft 10 1/2 in (179 cm)
Weight	167.4 lb (76 kg)	167.8 lb (76 kg)
Style	Orthodox	Orthodox
Recognition	WBA (Super), WBC, IBF, WBO, The Ring and TBRB undisputed Super Middleweight Champion; The Ring No. 5 ranked pound-for-pound fighter 4-division world champion	WBA (Super), IBF and IBO; Middleweight Champion; The Ring/TBRB; No. 1 Ranked Middleweight

Result
- Álvarez wins by 12–round unanimous decision (116–112, 115–113, 115–113)

Canelo Álvarez vs. Gennady Golovkin III, billed as The Trilogy, was a professional boxing match contested on September 17, 2022, for the undisputed super middleweight championship.

== Background ==
After knocking out Amir Khan back in 2016, Álvarez vacated his WBC middleweight title, with Golovkin subsequently being awarded it. Some critics labelled a Álvarez 'a duck' for doing so, believing the Mexican was attempting to 'age out' Golovkin as much as possible. However, Álvarez's promoter, Oscar De la Hoya, accused Golovkin's team of dismissing a career high $10 million guarantee along with a share of pay per view profits. In September 2017, the pair finally fought, and despite Golovkin outlanding Álvarez in 10 of the 12 rounds according to CompuBox, the fight ended in a controversial split draw. Adalaide Byrd's scorecard of 118–110 for Álvarez received a large amount of criticism. Many purists believed Golovkin had done enough to get the decision over Álvarez, and called the fight a 'robbery'.

The controversial outcome led to a rematch taking place, and in September 2018, Álvarez defeated Golovkin via majority decision. However, although not as much as the first fight, there were still claims of a robbery, with people believing that Golovkin had beaten Álvarez twice. There were calls for a third fight, which took time to take place.

Álvarez then unified with IBF middleweight champion Daniel Jacobs and became a four-division world champion with a knockout win over WBO light heavyweight champion Sergey Kovalev, before becoming an undisputed world champion at super middleweight. Golovkin reclaimed his IBF title with a controversial decision win over Sergiy Derevyanchenko. Despite stating his willingness to face Derevyachenko in a rematch, GGG ultimately never pursued it and remained inactive for over a year before defending his title against mandatory challenger Kamil Szeremeta. In 2022, he unified the division against Ryōta Murata in Japan. On February 25, 2022, it was announced that Álvarez had signed a two-fight deal with Matchroom Boxing. The first fight of the deal would see Álvarez returning to light heavyweight to face WBA (Super) light heavyweight champion, Dmitry Bivol, before returning to super middleweight to face Golovkin. On May 7, Álvarez was defeated by Bivol via unanimous decision. Despite claiming he would activate his rematch clause and face Bivol again, it was announced on May 24 that Álvarez and Golovkin would fight a third time, five years after their first fight, live on DAZN, with Golovkin moving weight divisions for the first time in his career to do so.

On the fight night, Álvarez defeated Golovkin via unanimous decision with the scores of 115–113 (twice) and 116–112. The fight proved to be the most lopsided as well as tactical in their rivalry with Canelo easily controlling most of the rounds. The scorecards generated controversy once again, this time with most believing they were too favorable for Golovkin.

== Aftermath ==
On 8 February 2023, Golovkin vacated the IBF title after being ordered to face mandatory challenger Esquiva Falcão. On 9 March, he relinquished the WBA title after being ordered to face Regular champion Erislandy Lara. On 14 June Golovkin vacated his IBO world title, IBO President Ed Levine announced.

== Fight card ==
Confirmed bouts:

Weight class		vs.		Method	Round	Time	Notes
Super middleweight	Canelo Álvarez (c)	def.	Gennady Golovkin	UD	12		^{Note 1}
Super flyweight	Jesse Rodríguez (c)	def.	Israel González	UD	12		^{Note 2}
Super middleweight	Ali Akhmedov	def.	Gabriel Rosado	UD	10		^{Note 3}
Middleweight	Austin Williams	def.	Kieron Conway	UD	10
Super middleweight	Diego Pacheco	def.	Enrique Collazo	TKO	5/10
Light welterweight	Marc Castro	def.	Kevin Mendoza	KO	5/8	1:40
Light welterweight	Aaron Aponte	vs.	Fernando Angel Molina	SD	8
Super flyweight	Anthony Herrera	def.	Delvin McKinley	TD	5/6	0:19

^Note 1 For WBA (Super), WBC, IBF, WBO and The Ring super middleweight titles
^Note 2 For WBC super flyweight title
^Note 3 For vacant WBC Silver and IBF-USBA super middleweight titles

== Broadcasting ==
The bout was broadcast live by sports streaming service DAZN to existing subscribers worldwide excluding Latin America. The bout was broadcast on pay-per-view in the United States and Canada.

Country	Broadcaster			
Country	Free-to-air	Cable/Pay television	PPV	Stream
United States (host)	—N/a		DAZN PPV	
Canada	—N/a		DAZN PPV	
United Kingdom	—N/a		DAZN PPV	
Ireland	—N/a		DAZN PPV	
Australia	—N/a		DAZN PPV	
New Zealand	—N/a		DAZN PPV	
Worldwide^{excl.}	—N/a			DAZN
Mexico	Azteca 7 Canal 5	—N/a		TV Azteca Deportes; Vix+
Latin America	—N/a	ESPN	—N/a	
Kazakhstan	Qazaqstan; Qazsport; Channel One Eurasia	—N/a		

^excl. Live on DAZN worldwide excluding Kazakhstan and Latin America.

Preceded by vs. Dmitry Bivol	Canelo Álvarez's bouts 17 September 2022	Succeeded by vs. John Ryder
Preceded by vs. Ryōta Murata	Gennady Golovkin's bouts 17 September 2022	Retired
