= Jürgen Brähmer vs. Robert Brant =

Boxing match

- Date: 27 October 2017
- Venue: Sport- und Kongresshalle, Schwerin, Mecklenburg-Vorpommern, Germany
- Title(s) on the line: WBC super middleweight title eliminator

Tale of the tape
Boxer	(Germany) Jürgen Brähmer	(United States) Robert Brant
Nickname		"Bravo"
Hometown	Stralsund, Mecklenburg-Vorpommern, Germany	Saint Paul, Minnesota, U.S.
Pre-fight record	48–3 (35 KO)	22–0 (15 KO)
Age	39 years	27 years
Height	5 ft 11 in (180 cm)	5 ft 11 in (180 cm)
Weight	166 9/10 lb (76 kg)	166 lb (75 kg)
Style	Southpaw	Orthodox
Recognition	IBF; No. 10 Ranked Light Heavyweight; WBC; No. 12 Ranked Super Middleweight; WBA; No. 14 Ranked Light Heavyweight; TBRB; No. 9 Ranked Light Heavyweight	WBA; No. 2 Ranked Middleweight; WBO; No. 3 Ranked Middleweight; WBC; No. 23 Ranked Super Middleweight

Result
- Brähmer defeats Brant via UD (119–109, 118–110, 116–112).

Jürgen Brähmer vs. Robert Brant was a professional boxing match contested on 27 October 2017.

== Background ==
Brähmer entered the World Boxing Super Series in July 2017, having not fought since losing to Nathan Cleverly at Light Heavyweight the previous October. Four days later it was announced that unbeaten prospect Rob Brant would move up from middleweight to super middleweight to enter the tournament, the only American boxer to take part. Given the opportunity to compete, Brant stated he would "be proud to have the opportunity to represent the United States".

At the WBSS draft Gala, held at the Grimaldi Forum in Monaco on 8 July, Brähmer, seeded fourth in the tournament, was matched against Brant.

Brähmer's last fight at super middleweight was a decision win over Mario Veit in September 2007, before he moved up to win the WBO Light heavyweight title. Brant entered the fight as a 8/13 favourite.

== The fight ==
Brähmer dominated the bout, outboxing and outworking Brant over the twelve rounds. Brant was unable to cope with Brähmer's refined technique, and he eventually seemed to tire out having never fought twelve rounds before. At the end of 12 rounds, all three judges scored the bout for Brähmer 119–109, 118–110 and 116–112. Brähmer's promoter and tournament organizer, Kalle Sauerland, called it Brähmer's best performance of all time.

== Aftermath ==
Brähmer moved on to the semi finals to face Callum Smith. However he was forced to withdraw due to an influenzal infection, three days after the first semi final between George Groves and Chris Eubank Jr..

== Undercard ==
Confirmed bouts:

== Broadcasting ==
Country	Broadcaster
Baltic & Nordic countries	Viasat
Belgium	VOO
Bulgaria	Nova
Canada	Super Channel
Germany	SAT.1
Russia	Match! Boets
Singapore	StarHub
Sub-Saharan Africa	TVMS
Turkey	Tivibu Sports
United Kingdom	ITV
United States	Audience
Ukraine	Inter

Preceded by vs. Nathan Cleverly	Jürgen Brähmer's bouts 27 October 2017	Succeeded by ~~vs. Callum Smith~~ vs. Pablo Daniel Zamora Nievas
Preceded by vs. Alexis Hloros	Robert Brant's bouts 27 October 2017	Succeeded by vs. Colby Courter
