= Canelo Álvarez vs. Caleb Plant =

2021 professional boxing match

- Date: November 6, 2021
- Venue: MGM Grand Garden Arena; Paradise, Nevada, United States
- Title(s) on the line: WBA (Super), WBC, IBF, WBO, The Ring and TBRB undisputed super middleweight title

Tale of the tape
Boxer	Saúl Álvarez	Caleb Plant
Nickname	Canelo ("Cinnamon")	"Sweet Hands"
Hometown	Guadalajara, Jalisco, Mexico	Ashland City, Tennessee, U.S.
Purse	$40,000,000	$10,000,000
Pre-fight record	56–1–2 (38 KO)	21–0 (12 KO)
Age	31 years, 3 months	29 years, 3 months
Height	5 ft 8 in (173 cm)	6 ft 1 in (185 cm)
Weight	168 lb (76 kg)	167 lb (76 kg)
Style	Orthodox	Orthodox
Recognition	WBA (Super), WBC, WBO, and The Ring; Super Middleweight Champion; TBRB; No. 1 Ranked Super Middleweight; The Ring No. 1 ranked pound-for-pound fighter 4-division world champion	IBF; Super Middleweight Champion; The Ring/TBRB; No. 2 Ranked Super Middleweight

Result
- Álvarez wins via 11th-round TKO

Canelo Álvarez vs. Caleb Plant was a professional boxing match contested on November 6, 2021, for the undisputed super middleweight championship.

The bout took place at MGM Grand Garden Arena in Paradise, Nevada and would determine the first undisputed super middleweight champion in boxing history. Álvarez won the bout via 11th-round technical knockout.

== Background ==
A deal was closed for the fight to take place at the MGM Grand Garden Arena in Paradise, Nevada on September 18, 2021, but talks broke down over disagreements in the contract. A potential fight with WBA (Super) light heavyweight champion Dmitry Bivol then seemed likely for Álvarez, however the September 18 date was scrapped. A deal was revisited between the two parties for a fight in November 2021. On August 19, 2021, both fighters were confirmed to have agreed to terms and soon afterwards, the fight was officially announced on Álvarez's Instagram page.

On September 21, 2021, the two fighters were engaged in a brief onstage scuffle during their first press conference, in which Álvarez initiated physical contact during their face-off when he shoved Plant. Álvarez stated that he had done this because he took offense to Plant's use of the word "motherfucker", interpreting it as an insult to his mother. Plant denied to reporters that he had used the common American curse word in that context. Moreover, he drew attention to Álvarez's hypocrisy, accurately indicating that Álvarez had previously used the same slur against Demetrius Andrade on the night of May 8, 2021 in the aftermath of his fight against Billy Joe Saunders in Arlington, Texas.

The bouts featured on the PPV undercard were announced on October 18, 2021, with Anthony Dirrell facing off against Marcos Hernandez, Rey Vargas going up against Leonardo Baez, and Elvis Rodriguez taking on Juan Pablo Romero.

== The fight ==
Plant would use feints, an educated jab and smooth footwork to stay off the ropes and mostly out of harm's way for the first few rounds. However Alvarez would break Plant down with relentless pressure and dedicated attacks to the body. In round 11, a left hook followed by a right uppercut sent Plant down, he beat the count but appeared to be on unsteady legs and then a barrage of shots sent him down again prompting referee Russell Mora to wave it off giving Álvarez a TKO victory. At the time of the stoppage, Álvarez was ahead on the scorecards with 98–92, 96–94, and 97–93. ESPN has it 98–92 for Álvarez. With the victory, Álvarez had become only the fourth boxer to be an undisputed champion since the four-belt era began in 2007, following Terence Crawford, Oleksandr Usyk and Josh Taylor.

== Aftermath ==
At the WBC Convention on 15 November in Mexico City, the WBC approved the request of Álvarez's trainer and manager, Eddy Reynoso, to have Álvarez challenge Ilunga Makabu for his WBC cruiserweight title. Álvarez has never competed at cruiserweight, so Reynoso had needed to petition the WBC to order the title fight. The fight had been rumoured to take place in May 2022. This ultimately did not materialize, as Makabu was forced into a mandatory defense of his title in a rematch against Thabiso Mchunu on 29 January 2022. Instead, it was announced on 25 February 2022 that Álvarez had signed a two-fight deal with Matchroom Boxing; the first fight would see him returning to the light heavyweight division to challenge undefeated WBA champion Dmitry Bivol on 7 May.

== Fight card ==
Confirmed bouts:

Weight Class		vs.		Method	Round	Time	Notes
Super middleweight	(Mexico) Canelo Álvarez (c)	def.	(United States) Caleb Plant (c)	TKO	11/12	1:05	^{Note 1}
Super middleweight	(United States) Anthony Dirrell	def.	(United States) Marcos Hernandez	KO	4/10	0:22
Super bantamweight	(Mexico) Rey Vargas	def.	(Mexico) Leonardo Baez	UD	10
Super lightweight	(Dominican Republic) Elvis Rodriguez	def.	(Mexico) Juan Pablo Romero	KO	5/10	2:59
Preliminary Card
Lightweight	(Mexico) Jose Antonio Meza	def.	(United States) Jose Manuel Gomez	UD	8
Super flyweight	(United States) Fernando Diaz	def.	(Mexico) Jan Salvatierra	KO	5/6	2:16
Super flyweight	(Mexico) Joselito Velázquez	def.	(United States) Gilberto Mendoza	UD	8
Welterweight	(Cuba) Rances Barthelemy	def.	(Argentina) Gustavo David Vittori	TKO	2/8	1:54

^Note 1 For WBA (Super), WBC, IBF, WBO and The Ring super middleweight titles

== Broadcasting ==
Country/Region	Free-to-air	Cable/Satellite	PPV	Stream
United States (host)	—N/a		Showtime	
Mexico	Azteca 7 Azteca Uno adn40 A Más	—N/a		TV Azteca Deportes
Australia	—N/a		Main Event, Kayo Sports	
Latvia	—N/a			Go3
United Kingdom	—N/a		BT Sport Box Office	
Ireland	—N/a		BT Sport Box Office	
Japan	—N/a	Wowow	—N/a	
Russia	—N/a	Match TV	—N/a	
Turkey	—N/a			S Sport Plus
Unsold markets	—N/a		FITE TV	

== Reception ==
The fight generated a live gate of around $18,000,000 from the 16,586 tickets sold in the sold-out show. The card was reported to have sold around 800,000 PPV buys in the US. At the price of $79.95, the card generated roughly $64 million of domestic revenue.

Preceded by vs. Billy Joe Saunders	Canelo Álvarez's bouts 6 November 2021	Succeeded by vs. Dmitry Bivol
Preceded by vs. Caleb Truax	Caleb Plant's bouts 6 November 2021	Succeeded by vs. Anthony Dirrell
