= Canelo Álvarez vs. Dmitry Bivol =

2022 professional boxing match

Legacy is Earned
- Date: May 7, 2022
- Venue: T-Mobile Arena; Paradise, Nevada, United States
- Title(s) on the line: WBA (Super) light heavyweight title

Tale of the tape
Boxer	Dmitry Bivol	Canelo Álvarez
Hometown	Tokmok, Chüy, Kyrgyzstan	Guadalajara, Jalisco, Mexico
Pre-fight record	19–0 (11 KO)	57–1–2 (39 KO)
Age	31 years, 4 months	31 years, 9 months
Height	6 ft 0 in (183 cm)	5 ft 8 in (173 cm)
Weight	174 3/5 lb (79 kg)	174 2/5 lb (79 kg)
Style	Orthodox	Orthodox
Recognition	WBA (Super); Light Heavyweight Champion; TBRB; No. 1 Ranked Light Heavyweight; The Ring; No. 2 Ranked Light Heavyweight	WBA (Super), WBC, IBF, WBO, The Ring and TBRB undisputed Super Middleweight Champion; The Ring No. 1 ranked pound-for-pound fighter 4-division world champion

Result
- Bivol wins via 12-round unanimous decision (115–113, 115–113, 115–113)

Canelo Álvarez vs. Dmitry Bivol, billed as Legacy is Earned, was a professional boxing match between 4-division world champion, Canelo Álvarez, and defending WBA (Super) light heavyweight champion, Dmitry Bivol. The fight took place on May 7, 2022, with Bivol prevailing as the winner by unanimous decision.

== Background ==
After Canelo Álvarez unified all four major world titles to become undisputed super middleweight champion with an eleventh-round technical knockout victory over Caleb Plant on November 6, 2021, it appeared likely that Álvarez would move up to challenge for a world title in a fifth division, when his trainer Eddy Reynoso successfully petitioned the WBC on November 15, 2021, to allow Álvarez to challenge WBC cruiserweight champion Ilunga Makabu. The fight ultimately did not happen, as Makabu was forced into a mandatory defense of his title in a rematch against Thabiso Mchunu on January 29, 2022, which the former won via split decision.

Instead, it was announced on February 25, 2022, that Álvarez had signed a two-fight deal with Matchroom Boxing; the first fight would see him returning to the light heavyweight division to challenge long-reigning undefeated WBA (Super) champion Dmitry Bivol on May 7 in a bout that would be televised as sports streaming service DAZN's first pay-per-view offering in the United States and Canada.

Bivol first won the WBA interim light heavyweight title in only his seventh professional bout in May 2016, making his first defense of the full WBA world title in 2017, before being designated as Super champion in 2019. Against Álvarez, Bivol made his fourth defense of the WBA (Super) title, and his ninth world title defense overall.

The fight was able to take place because while in response to the 2022 Russian invasion of Ukraine three of boxing's world governing bodies (the World Boxing Council, International Boxing Federation, and World Boxing Organization) had blocked championship fights involving Russian and Belarusian boxers, the World Boxing Association (WBA) chose to allow the fight to proceed.

Bivol was a 4 to 1 underdog with the bookies.

== Fight details ==
Bivol controlled the bout from the opening bell, using his size and his jab to keep Álvarez at range. At the end of 12 rounds all three judges scored the bout 115–113 in favour of Bivol. Bivol won the final 3 rounds on all three judges scorecards. Interestingly, all three judges scored the first four rounds unanimously for Álvarez. Bivol fought behind the jab in the opening round whilst Álvarez attacked his body. Álvarez gained Bivol's attention when he landed a clean right uppercut on his chin to close the fourth round. Bivol used his excellent foot movements and took control of the fight during the mid rounds. Bivol was warned by referee Russell Mora in the seventh round for pushing Álvarez down. He was not deducted any points. Álvarez began to tire from round 8 as Bivol continued to outwork him.

Bivol's arms were bruised due to Álvarez's tactics, the same tactic he had used in his win over Callum Smith where he targeted his arms. Bivol said, "He beat my arm up but not my head. He kept hitting me in the arms, and I kept hitting him in the face ... I expect that. I watched the fight against Callum Smith." Bivol claimed he was the best in the division and apologised to his promoter Eddie Hearn, who had recently had the Álvarez-Golovkin trilogy fight signed for September 2022. Speaking after the fight, Álvarez planned to activate the rematch clause in the contract. He said, "It doesn't end like this. No excuses, I lost today; he is a great boxer ... I felt his power. He comes in and he goes out. He manages his distance really well." This was also Álvarez's first professional loss since 2013 and was on a 16-fight unbeaten streak. He felt Bivol only won 5 rounds.

According to CompuBox punch statistics, Bivol had outlanded Álvarez in every round of the fight, for a total of 152 punches landed out of 710 thrown (21%), compared to Álvarez's 84 of 495 (17%).

== Aftermath ==
Many media reporters and pundits drew attention to the judges' official scorecards: all three judges had scored Álvarez the winner of the first four rounds, something that was roundly criticized, and described by ESPN reporter Mike Coppinger as "puzzling".

Despite the widespread public opinion that Bivol was the deserved winner, Álvarez initially disagreed with this notion, stating in his post-fight interview: "I don't feel like I lost the fight... Personally, I felt he [Bivol] only won four or five rounds." He later acknowledged defeat and alluded to an issue hampering his training regimen, "It’s another reason, but I don’t want to say anything and make any excuses. I lost and that’s it. I got tired and that’s it. I couldn’t train like usually, but it is what it is." He went on to express his desire to fight Bivol again: "We want the rematch, and we're going to do better in the rematch." Despite this, a rematch between Álvarez and Bivol did not materialize immediately, as the former opted to face unified middleweight champion Gennady Golovkin in a trilogy bout instead.

== Reception ==
According to Dan Rafael, the PPV did 520,000 buys worldwide generating between $35 million to $40 million in revenue. The PPV numbers were much lower than the 1 million they had forecasted. According to reports, Álvarez was to take home a $15 million base up, rising up to $53 million. Bivol was guaranteed $2 million base up to $5 million, depending on PPV revenue, his highest career purse.

== Fight card ==
Confirmed bouts:

Weight Class		vs.		Method	Round	Time	Notes
Light heavyweight	Dmitry Bivol (c)	def.	Canelo Álvarez	UD	12/12		^{Note 1}
Light welterweight	Montana Love	def.	Gabriel Valenzuela	UD	12/12
Welterweight	Shakhram Giyasov	def.	Christian Gomez	UD	10/10
Lightweight	Marc Castro	def.	Pedro Vicente Scharbaai	UD	6/6
Heavyweight	Zhang Zhilei	def.	Scott Alexander	KO	1/10	1:54
Flyweight	Joselito Velázquez	def.	Jose Soto	TKO	6/10	1:06
Middleweight	Aaron Silva	def.	Alexis Espino	TKO	4/8	1:17
Super featherweight	Elnur Abduraimov	def.	Manuel Correa	TKO	2/8	2:43
Light welterweight	Fernando Angel Molina	def.	Ricardo Valdovinos	SD	6/6

^Note 1 For WBA (Super) light heavyweight title

== Broadcasting ==
The bout was broadcast live by sports streaming service DAZN to existing subscribers worldwide excluding Latin America. The bout was broadcast on pay-per-view in the United States and Canada.

Country	Broadcaster			
Country	Free-to-air	Cable/Pay television	PPV	Stream
United States (host)	—N/a		DAZN PPV	
Canada	—N/a		DAZN PPV	
Worldwide^{excl.}	—N/a			DAZN
Mexico	Azteca 7 Canal 5	—N/a		TV Azteca Deportes; TUDN
Latin America	—N/a		ESPN Latin America	Star+

^excl. Live on DAZN worldwide excluding Latin America.

Preceded by vs. Umar Salamov	Dmitry Bivol's bouts 7 May 2022	Succeeded by vs. Gilberto Ramírez
Preceded by vs. Caleb Plant	Canelo Álvarez's bouts 7 May 2022	Succeeded by vs. Gennady Golovkin III
