= Callum Smith vs. Nieky Holzken =

Boxing match

- Date: 24 February 2018
- Venue: Arena Nürnberger Versicherung, Nürnberg, Bavaria, Germany

Tale of the tape
Boxer	(United Kingdom) Callum Smith	(Netherlands) Nieky Holzken
Nickname	"Mundo"	"The Natural"
Hometown	Liverpool, Merseyside, UK	Helmond, North Brabant, Netherlands
Pre-fight record	22–0 (17 KO)	13–0 (10 KO)
Age	27 years, 10 months	34 years, 2 months
Height	6 ft 3 in (191 cm)	6 ft 0 in (183 cm)
Weight	167 1/2 lb (76 kg)	167 1/2 lb (76 kg)
Style	Orthodox	Orthodox
Recognition	WBC; No. 1 Ranked Super Middleweight; The Ring; No. 3 Ranked Super Middleweight; TBRB; No. 8 Ranked Super Middleweight; WBC Silver super middleweight champion	Former BeNeLux super middleweight champion

Result
- Smith defeated Holzken by Unanimous Decision

Callum Smith vs. Nieky Holzken was a professional boxing match contested on 24 February 2018.

== Background ==
On 27 October 2017, 39 year old former world champion Jürgen Brähmer (49–3, 35 KOs) defeated American boxer Robert Brant to advance to the semi-finals against Callum Smith, who had defeated Erik Skoglund a month earlier, with the fight scheduled to take place in early 2018. A couple days later, Smith spoke out stating he would like the fight to take place in his home city of Liverpool, however would be open to fighting anywhere else. On 15 November, promoter Kalle Sauerland stated the fight could take place in Liverpool at the Echo Arena or Germany.

Smith's trainer Joe Gallagher believed a fight in Germany would be unfair on Smith, due to Germany having gained a reputation for contentious decisions and home fighters receiving questionable wins. He later went on to state the fight should take place on neutral ground, mentioning Monte Carlo, Dublin and Amsterdam as potential locations.

On 11 January 2018, the fight was finally announced to take place at the Arena Nürnberger in Nuremberg, Germany on 24 February, a week after the first semi final between George Groves and Chris Eubank Jr.

On 20 February, four days before the fight, German website boxen1.com reported that Brähmer had withdrawn from the tournament after failing to overcome an illness he had been fighting for a week. Comosa stated the event would still go ahead with a replacement to be announced. 34 year old Dutch kickboxer and boxer Nieky Holzken (13–0, 10 KOs), who was scheduled to fight on the undercard against Dmitry Chudinov, became the frontrunner to replace Brähmer. In a short statement, Brähmer stated he had a 'feverish infection' and apologised to his fans. Promoter Kalle Sauerland later confirmed that Holzken was the reserve fighter and would replace Brähmer and fight Smith.

== The fight ==
Smith used his jab from the opening bell and managed to control the distance throughout the fight, also managing to land his right hand successfully on many occasions. Holzken was the faster and frequently more aggressive fighter, however Smith was far more busier in each round. Each round was the same with Smith standing straight up, jabbing constantly and throwing right hands.

After 12 rounds the three judges scored the fight 118–110, 117–111 and 117–111 in favour of Smith giving him a unanimous decision victory.

== Aftermath ==
In the post-fight, Smith stated, "He was tough but I landed a lot jabs and my hand hurts a little bit. He was awkward, novicey but I'm not engaging in a shoot-out. I'm the better boxer." George Groves faced off with Smith immediately after the interviews took place.

== Undercard ==
Confirmed bouts:

== Broadcasting ==
Country	Broadcaster
Baltic & Nordic countries	Viasat
Belgium	VOO
Bulgaria	Nova
Canada	Super Channel
Germany	SAT.1
Russia	Match! Boets
Singapore	StarHub
Sub-Saharan Africa	TVMS
Turkey	Tivibu Sports
United Kingdom	ITV
United States	Audience
Ukraine	Inter

Preceded by vs. Erik Skoglund	Callum Smith's bouts 24 February 2018	Succeeded by vs. George Groves
Preceded by vs. Viktor Polyakov	Nieky Holzken's bouts 24 February 2018	Succeeded by vs. Bernard Donfack
