= Mikael Lawal =

Nigerian-born British boxer (born 1995)

Personal information
- Nickname: Lethal
- Nationality: British, French
- Born: 3 July 1995 (age 31) Lagos, Nigeria
- Height: 6 ft 2 in (188 cm)
- Weight: Cruiserweight

Boxing career
- Stance: Orthodox

Boxing record
- Total fights: 19
- Wins: 17
- Win by KO: 11
- Losses: 2

Mikael Lawal (born 3 July 1995) is a Nigerian-born British-French professional boxer who held the British cruiserweight title from November 2022 until October 2023.

== Early life ==
Lawal was born in Lagos, Nigeria. He moved to the UK and France at age one and lived there until he was 13 when went back to Nigeria with his mother, who died a short while later. Lawal, then aged 14, moved in with his father and stepmother but ran away from home due to difficulties in the household. He lived in Paris before moving London. He lived on the streets for a short period before visiting the British High Commission, after which he was placed in an orphanage and eventually returned to the UK at age 16.

== Professional career ==
After only nine amateur bouts, Lawal had his first professional fight at York Hall in London on 22 April 2017, stopping Jindrich Velecky in the first round. He signed a long-term promotional contract with Team Sauerland in July 2017.

With a 16 fight unbeaten record, Lawal was scheduled to face Deion Jumah for the vacant British cruiserweight title at Alexandra Palace in London on 27 November 2022. However, Jumah suffered a career-ending eye injury while sparring in training camp and withdrew less than two weeks before the contest. Lawal fought late replacement David Jamieson and claimed the title when his opponent retired after the eighth round due to a jaw injury.

Back at York Hall on 21 October 2023, he lost the title in his first defense, suffering a unanimous decision defeat against Isaac Chamberlain in a bout where the vacant Commonwealth cruiserweight championship was also up for grabs.

In his next fight, Lawal challenged English cruiserweight champion Viddal Riley at The O2 Arena in London on 31 March 2024, losing by unanimous decision.

== Professional boxing record ==
19 fights	17 wins	2 losses
By knockout	11	0
By decision	6	2

No.	Result	Record	Opponent	Type	Round, time	Date	Location	Notes
19	Loss	17–2	Viddal Riley	UD	10	31 Mar 2024	The O2 Arena, London, England	For English cruiserweight title
18	Loss	17–1	Isaac Chamberlain	UD	12	21 Oct 2023	York Hall, London, England	Lost British and for vacant Commonwealth cruiserweight titles
17	Win	17–0	David Jamieson	RTD	8 (12), 3:00	27 Nov 2022	Alexandra Palace, Muswell Hill, London, England	Won vacant British cruiserweight title
16	Win	16–0	Javier Andino	KO	2 (8), 1:25	30 July 2022	Bournemouth International Centre, Bournemouth, England	
15	Win	15–0	Leonardo Damian Bruzzese	TKO	5 (8), ?:??	20 Nov 2021	Wembley Arena, London, England	
14	Win	14–0	Benoit Huber	TKO	3 (6), 1:36	2 Oct 2021	Wembley Arena, London, England	
13	Win	13–0	Ossie Jervier	UD	6	10 Nov 2020	BT Sports Studio, London, England	
12	Win	12–0	Damian Chambers	TKO	1 (3), 1:34	19 Jul 2019	Planet Ice, Cheshire, England	
11	Win	11–0	David Jamieson	UD	3	19 Jul 2019	Planet Ice, Altrincham, England	
10	Win	10–0	Antony Woolery	MD	3	19 July 2019	Planet Ice, Altrincham, England	
9	Win	9–0	Kent Kauppinen	PTS	6	19 July 2019	York Hall, London, England	
8	Win	8–0	Tamas Kozma	KO, 2:09	3	28 Sep 2018	King Abdullah Sports City, Jeddah, Saudi Arabia	
7	Win	7–0	Istvan Kun	TKO	3 (6), 2:06	14 Jul 2018	Baden-Arena, Offenburg, Germany	
6	Win	6–0	Adam Williams	TKO	5 (6), 2:50	17 Feb 2018	Manchester Arena, Manchester, England	
5	Win	5–0	Istvan Orsos	UD	6	27 Jan 2018	Arena Riga, Riga, Latvia	
4	Win	4–0	Tomislav Rudan	TKO	2 (4), 2:57	14 Oct 2017	Wembley Arena, London, England	
3	Win	3–0	Jakub Wojcik	PTS	4	16 Sep 2017	Echo Arena, Liverpool, England	
2	Win	2–0	Florians Strupits	TKO	1 (4), 1:57	9 Jul 2017	York Hall, London, England	
1	Win	1–0	Jindrich Velecky	TKO	1 (4), 2:94	22 Apr 2017	York Hall, London, England	
