= Viddal Riley =

British boxer, rapper and internet personality (born 1997)

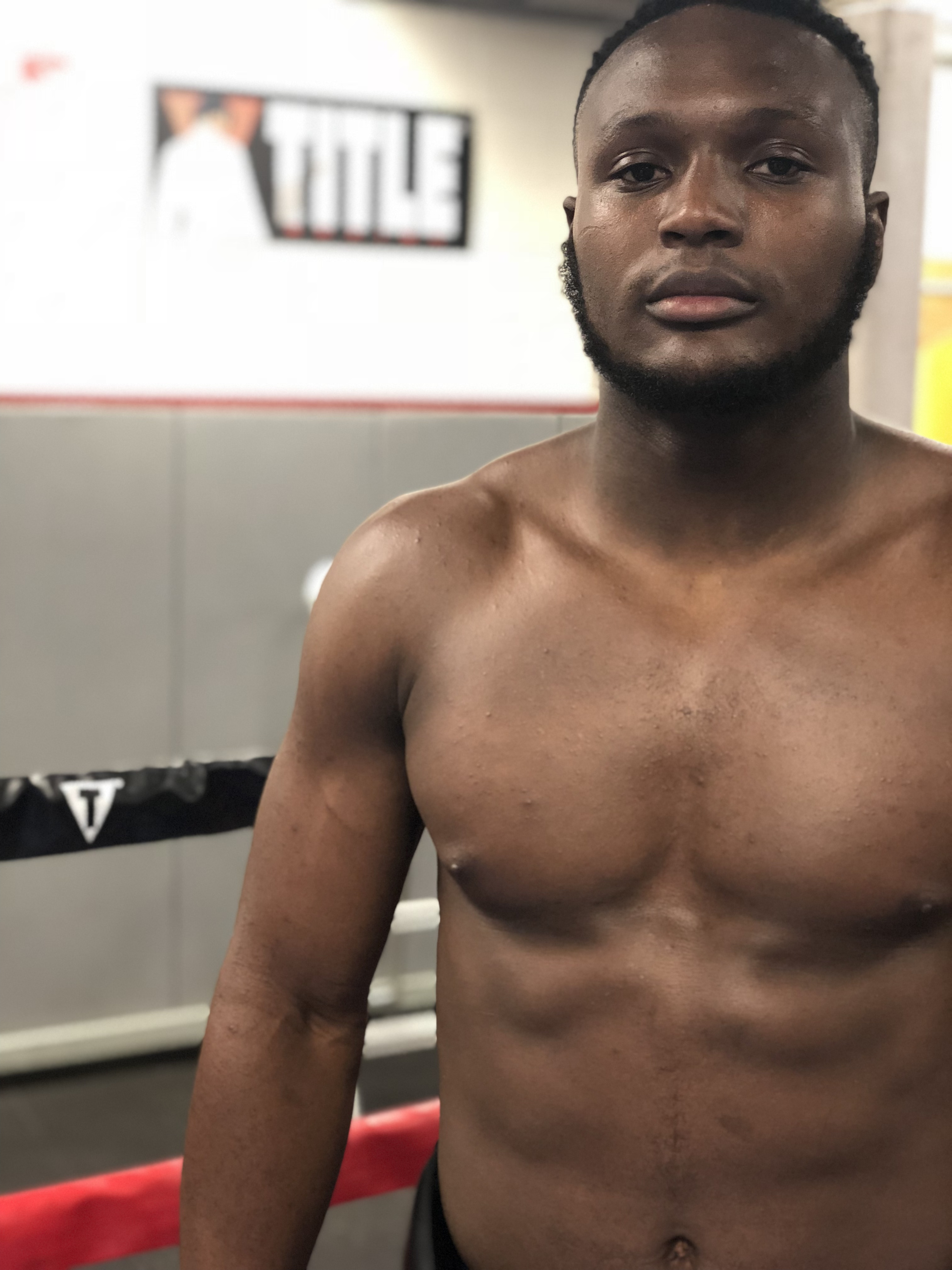
- Riley in 2018
- Born: Viddal Ethan Danso Riley; 7 July 1997 (age 29); Hackney, London, England
- Other name: The Rilest • Ril • IsItRil
- Relatives: Wretch 32 (cousin)
- Boxing career
- Height: 6 ft 1 in (185cm)
- Weight: Cruiserweight
- Reach: 76 1/2 in (194 cm)
- Stance: Orthodox

Boxing record
- Total fights: 15
- Wins: 15
- Win by KO: 7
Medal record
Men's amateur boxing
Representing England
European Junior Championships
Silver medal – second place	2013 Anapa	Light-heavyweight

Viddal Ethan Danso Riley (born 7 July 1997) is an English professional boxer, rapper, and internet personality. He has held the European cruiserweight title since April 2026. Previously, he held the British title from 2025 to 2026 and English title from 2023 to 2025. As an amateur, he won a silver medal at the 2013 European Junior Championships.

== Early life ==
Viddal Riley was born on 7 July 1997 in Hackney, London, but raised in Tottenham, London. He attended Northumberland Park Community School in the Northumberland Park area of Tottenham in the London Borough of Haringey, England. Riley is of Ghanaian heritage.

While he was still an amateur boxer, Riley had a day job as a personal trainer at a GymBox gym in Stratford, London. It was here that he first met and trained several YouTube personalities, including KSI. The two fights between KSI and Logan Paul brought Riley huge publicity and exposure.

== Amateur career ==
Riley started his boxing career at six years old when he was introduced to the sport by his father Derrick Riley. As a young amateur, he trained at West Ham Boxing Club. He went on to collect eight national championships, as well as winning a European Junior Silver Medal in Anapa, Russia. He also became a 2014 Nanjing Youth Olympian for Team GB. According to BoxRec.com, Riley amassed an amateur record of 14-6 (2 KO's), losing 4 of his last 8 amateur bouts.

== Professional career ==
=== Early career ===
Riley first entered the Mayweather Boxing Club in Las Vegas in 2018 in preparation for KSI's second amateur fight with Logan Paul. There, he sparred the American NABF cruiserweight champion at the time, Andrew Tabiti. In doing so, he impressed Jeff Mayweather and Amer Abdallah, with whom he subsequently signed a deal to turn professional.

Riley made his professional debut on 30 November 2018 at the Big Punch Arena in Tijuana, Mexico against Julio Manuel Gonzalez, beating Gonzalez by knockout in the first round. He recorded another first-round knockout in his next fight, against Mitchell Spangler at the MGM Grand Garden Arena in Las Vegas on 19 January 2019, on the undercard of the WBA welterweight championship bout between Manny Pacquiao and Adrien Broner. Riley's third fight was a unanimous decision victory against Austine Nnamdi in Dubai on 3 May 2019, in which he headlined as the main event.

In November 2019, fellow countryman Lawrence Okolie, who would later become WBO world cruiserweight champion, praised Riley, stating that Riley "is in the top 5 [people] I've sparred".

Riley would next face Muhammad Abdullah in Las Vegas on 28 February 2020, achieving another unanimous decision victory to improve to 4–0.

He had been scheduled to fight on the undercard of the WBA lightweight title fight between Gervonta Davis and Yuriorkis Gamboa in 2019, in addition to fighting Rashad Coulter on the undercard of Mike Tyson vs. Roy Jones Jr. in 2020, yet he was forced to pull out of both fights due to a recurring back injury.

In November 2021, Riley signed a multi-fight deal with the promotional company Boxxer.

It was announced that Riley would make a debut in the United Kingdom as an undercard match of Amir Khan vs Kell Brook on 19 February 2022. On 11 February 2022 on Twitter, Riley had announced his opponent as Namibian boxer Willbeforce Shihepo. Riley won the fight by unanimous decision to put his record at 5–0.

During his sixth professional bout on the undercard of Richard Riakporhe vs Fabio Turchi on 11 June, Riley produced a huge knockout victory over Jone Volau, fifty-one seconds into the first round.

=== English cruiserweight champion ===
==== Riley vs. Quarless ====
Riley defeated the previously unbeaten boxer Nathan Quarless (10–0) for the vacant English cruiserweight championship as the co-feature to Caroline Dubois vs. Magali Rodriguez on 30 September 2023 at the York Hall in London. Riley defeated Quarless via unanimous decision, winning all ten rounds on all three judges' scorecards. Riley called out newly crowned British cruiserweight champion Isaac Chamberlain after his victory over Mikael Lawal the same night in a post-fight interview.

==== Riley vs. Lawal ====
"We don't run from bullies. Never have never will".

— Viddal Riley, Fabio Wardley vs. Frazer Clarke – Press Conference.

On 16 February 2024, it was announced that Riley will defend his English cruiserweight championship against former British cruiserweight champion Mikael Lawal (17–1) on the undercard of Fabio Wardley vs. Frazer Clarke on 31 March at The O2 Arena in London. A few days later, after the fight announcement, Boxxer announced that Riley had signed a long-term promotional deal. During the build-up to the fight, Riley promised his fans to take a dangerous road to try to get a world title shot in the next few years. At the press conference, Riley claimed that he had faced bigger punchers and labelled Lawal as a bully. Riley defended his English cruiserweight title by unanimous decision, with two judges scoring the fight 99–91 and the other judge scoring it 98–92. Lawal fractured three of Riley's ribs in the first round. During the post-match interview with Riley, current British cruiserweight champion Isaac Chamberlain criticized Riley's performance against Lawal, claiming "that performance was dead," with both arguing when the contract gets signed. Cheavon Clarke tried forcing himself into the conversation before all three were separated by security. A few days after the fight, Chamberlain continued to call Riley out, promising to "break him" if Riley produced another performance like he did against Lawal. The fight between Riley and Chamberlain was halted in progress after Chamberlain relinquished his title to fight Jack Massey for the European title, which left mandatory challenger Clarke knocking out Ellis Zorro to win the vacant British title.

==== Riley vs. Garber ====
In December 2024, it was announced that Riley will face Steve Eloundou Ntere (9–2) in a non-title bout on the undercard of Natasha Jonas vs. Ivana Habazin on 14 December 2024 at the Exhibition Centre in Liverpool. However, Ntere withdrew from the fight and would be replaced by Dan Garber (7–3). This bout marked Riley's debut fight at heavyweight, meaning his English Cruiserweight title was not on the line. Riley defeated Garber via technical knockout in the second round.

==== Cancelled bout with Chamberlain ====
After defeating Garber, Riley once again faced off with Isaac Chamberlain and the two verbally agreed to fight in February 2025. It was later announced that Riley will defend his English cruiserweight title against Chamberlain on 1 February 2025 at the Wembley Arena in London. However on 20 January, it was announced that Chamberlain would be withdrawing from the fight due to injury.

=== British cruiserweight champion ===
==== Riley vs. Clarke ====
After the cancellation of Riley's bout against Isaac Chamberlain, it was confirmed that Riley would not be fighting a replacement on 1 February 2025. Instead, Riley would be fighting at a later date, due to a replacement "not aligning with the bigger goals ahead". On 23 January 2025, it was confirmed that Riley would be facing British and WBA Intercontinental cruiserweight champion Cheavon Clarke (10–1) on the Chris Eubank Jr vs. Conor Benn undercard on 26 April 2025 at the Tottenham Hotspur Stadium for the British cruiserweight title. Riley went on to win the fight by unanimous decision and won the British cruiserweight title. According to CompuBox, Riley landed 24% of 617 punches thrown in the bout compared to Clarke, who threw 545 punches and landed 19% of punches.

In August 2025, Riley posted an Instagram story hinting that he and Boxxer had parted ways after stating that it's 'free agent season.' Following the departure, Riley began negotiating with various other promotions, including Eddie Hearn's Matchroom Boxing. On 6 December, Riley announced that he had signed a promotional deal with KSI's Misfits Boxing, under their MF Pro division. Riley explained in an interview with Sky Sports that the MF Pro events will be completely separate from the usual crossover events that Misfits produces, and that these shows will be traditional professional boxing.

Riley was in negotiations to face Aloys Youmbi as his first British cruiserweight title defense. However, in January 2026, Riley stated that Youmbi had withdrawn from the negotiations. Youmbi's manager on Instagram Lee Eaton stated that Youmbi has "bigger plans ahead."

=== European cruiserweight champion ===
==== Riley vs. Masternak ====
Riley challenged 39 year-old European cruiserweight champion Mateusz Masternak, as the co-main event of Derek Chisora vs. Deontay Wilder, on 4 April 2026 at The O2 Arena in London. He won by unanimous decision.

==== Riley vs. Coupe ====
On 7 October 2026, MF Pro announced that Riley would stage his first headline bout against undefeated Seydi Coupe (14–0), defending his European title. The bout took place on 14 November at Wembley Arena in London. He defeated Coupe via unanimous decision, retaining the European title.

== Other ventures ==
Riley maintains a strong social media presence: he has a YouTube channel with over one million subscribers as of April 2021, and releases original music independently on online streaming services Spotify and Apple Music.

He is the founder and owner of RIL Athletics, his own clothing brand.

== Personal life ==
Riley is a supporter of his local football club Tottenham Hotspur F.C.

== Professional boxing record ==
15 fights	15 wins	0 losses
By knockout	7	0
By decision	8	0

No.	Result	Record	Opponent	Type	Round, time	Date	Location	Notes
15	Win	15–0	Seydi Coupe	UD	12	14 Nov 2026	Wembley Arena, London, England	Retained European cruiserweight title
14	Win	14–0	Mateusz Masternak	UD	12	4 Apr 2026	The O2 Arena, London, England	Won European cruiserweight title
13	Win	13–0	Cheavon Clarke	UD	12	26 Apr 2025	Tottenham Hotspur Stadium, London, England	Won British cruiserweight title
12	Win	12–0	Dan Garber	TKO	2 (6), 2:35	14 Dec 2024	Exhibition Centre, Liverpool, England	
11	Win	11–0	Mikael Lawal	UD	10	31 Mar 2024	The O2 Arena, London, England	Retained English cruiserweight title
10	Win	10–0	Nathan Quarless	UD	10	30 Sep 2023	York Hall, London, England	Won vacant English cruiserweight title
9	Win	9–0	Anees Taj	TKO	4 (8), 2:31	16 Jun 2023	York Hall, London, England	
8	Win	8–0	Anees Taj	TKO	4 (8), 0:04	11 Feb 2023	Wembley Arena, London, England	
7	Win	7–0	Ross McGuigan	TKO	3 (6), 2:22	12 Nov 2022	Manchester Arena, Manchester, England	
6	Win	6–0	Jone Volau	TKO	1 (6), 0:51	11 Jun 2022	Wembley Arena, London, England	
5	Win	5–0	Willbeforce Shihepo	PTS	6	19 Feb 2022	Manchester Arena, Manchester, England	
4	Win	4–0	Muhammad Abdullah	UD	4	28 Feb 2020	Sam's Town Hotel & Gambling Hall, Sunrise Manor, Nevada, US	
3	Win	3–0	Austine Nnamdi	UD	4	3 May 2019	FIVE Palm Jumeirah, Dubai, UAE	
2	Win	2–0	Mitchell Spangler	KO	1 (4), 0:33	19 Jan 2019	MGM Grand Garden Arena, Paradise, Nevada, US	
1	Win	1–0	Julio Manuel Gonzalez	KO	1 (4), 1:19	30 Nov 2018	Big Punch Arena, Tijuana, Mexico	

== Discography ==
=== Mixtapes ===
List of mixtapes with selected details
Title	Details
Livin' Sports, Pt.2	Released: 3 October 2019; Label: Self-released; Format: Digital Download, streaming
Livin' Sports Pt.3	Released: 18 December 2020; Label: Self-released; Format: Digital Download, streaming

=== Extended plays ===
List of extended plays with selected details
Title	Details
Livin' Sports	Released: 10 September 2018; Label: Self-released; Format: Digital Download, streaming
Ds.1	Released: 25 February 2022; Label: Self-released; Format: Digital Download, streaming
Ds.2	Released: 1 April 2023; Label: Self-released; Format: Digital Download, streaming
Ds.3 (Different Sports)	Released: 25 August 2023; Label: Self-released; Format: Digital Download, streaming

=== As lead artist ===
Title	Year	Album
"Lionel Rich"	2019	Non-album singles
"Paddling Pools"	2019	Livin' Sports, Pt.2
"Ten Pins" (with Randolph)	2019	Non-album singles
"Marimba Freestyle" (with Randolph, Ninj & PB)	2019	Non-album singles
"R A N G E"	2020	Non-album singles
"Rilist No.1"	2020	Livin' Sports Pt.3
"Chess Piece" (with KayyKayy)	2020	Non-album singles
"Plugged In" (as Viddal Riley with Fumez The Engineer)	2020	Non-album singles

=== As featured artist ===
Title	Year	Album
"Holy Water" (Paul Bartolome featuring RIL)	2019	Screaming Through The Radio
"Bad Habits" (Benz featuring RIL & Nizzy Ninj)	2020	Non-album singles
"LIT" (Benz featuring RIL)	2020	Non-album singles
"Cruiserweight (.Ends. II)" (SAMOSAMO featuring RIL)	2022	Non-album singles

=== Guest appearances ===
List of non-single guest appearances, with other performing artists
Title	Year	Other artist(s)	Album
"Ninj & Viddal Stuntin"	2020	Nizzy Ninj	Rainy Summer 2

=== Music videos ===
List of music videos as lead and featured artist, showing directors
Title	Year	Director(s)
As lead artist
"Stay The Night" (with T-Bone)	2017	Braidefilms
"Paddling Pools"	2019	Josh Hall
"Marimba Freestyle" (featuring Randolph, Ninj & Benz)	2019	DA
"Pointing"	2019	Tory T6
"Ride For Team" (with PB & Natalie)	2019	Tory T6
"Freestyle"	2020	Tory T6
"Chess Piece" (with KayyKayy)	2020	Tory T6
"Favours" (featuring Jme)	2020	Tory T6
"Plugged In" (as Viddal Riley with Fumez The Engineer)	2020	Unknown
"LS3 Interlude"	2020	Unknown
As featured artist
"Bad Habits" (Benz featuring RIL & Nizzy Ninj)	2020	Tory T6

== Filmography ==
=== Film ===
Year	Title	Role	Notes	Ref.
2018	KSI: Can't Lose	Himself	Documentary	

=== Video games ===
Viddal Riley in video games
Year	Title	Role	Notes	Ref.
2024	Undisputed	Himself		
