= Osaze =

Osaze is both a given name and a surname. Notable people with the name include:

- Osaze De Rosario (born 2001), American soccer player
- Osaze Urhoghide (born 2000), English footballer
- Derrick Osaze (born 1993), British boxer
