= George Groves vs. Callum Smith =

Boxing match

- Date: 28 September 2018
- Venue: King Abdullah Sports City Indoor Stadium, Jeddah, Saudi Arabia
- Title(s) on the line: WBA (Super) and The Ring super middleweight title

Tale of the tape
Boxer	(United Kingdom) George Groves	(United Kingdom) Callum Smith
Nickname	"Saint George"	"Mundo"
Hometown	Hammersmith, London, UK	Liverpool, Merseyside, UK
Pre-fight record	28–3 (20 KO)	23–0 (17 KO)
Age	30 years, 6 months	28 years, 5 months
Height	5 ft 11 1/2 in (182 cm)	6 ft 3 in (191 cm)
Weight	167 3/4 lb (76 kg)	167 1/4 lb (76 kg)
Style	Orthodox	Orthodox
Recognition	WBA; Super Middleweight Champion; The Ring/TBRB; No. 1 Ranked Super Middleweight	WBC; No. 1 Ranked Super Middleweight; WBA; No. 4 Ranked Super Middleweight; The Ring; No. 3 Ranked Super Middleweight; TBRB; No. 8 Ranked Super Middleweight

Result
- Smith defeated Groves by 7th round knockout

George Groves vs. Callum Smith was a professional boxing match contested on 28 September 2018, for the WBA and The Ring Super Middleweight championship.

== Background ==
On 13 February, it was announced that the final of the World Boxing Super Series super-middleweight tournament would take place at the O2 Arena in London on 2 June 2018. The final was made up after George Groves defeated Chris Eubank Jr. on 17 February and Callum Smith defeating Nieky Holzken on 24 February. On 26 February, Groves tweeted that he would be going into surgery, after dislocating his shoulder in the final round against Eubank Jr.. He wrote, "We will be applying to the @WBSuperSeries for a one-month extension and are hopeful of securing this." He hoped to return to the ring by July.

On 9 May, Kalle Sauerland said that Groves could potentially be replaced by Eubank Jr. for the final against Smith, however there would be confirmation on the final in the next 10 days. He stated, "We're working at the moment on all the solutions and scenarios, where George [Groves] is fit and where he isn't. We're hopeful [Groves will be fit], so we'll see. You can't start the tournament and then have the final lingering into the next tournament. I'm sorry, that's not going to happen. We can push a month, but we can’t push it back by three or four months. We have a substitute system. We said that from day one, and that’s the situation. We want Groves in the final, but if that’s not possible and he doesn't declare himself fit in the next 10 days, we have to find a solution." On 28 May, it was said that Groves would be declared fit with the fight to take place on 14 July. By 6 July, there was still no date set, however according to Kalle Sauerland, the bout was expected to take place in September and likely not in the UK, with some rumours hinting there was a strong interest from Las Vegas and Middle East. Smith's trainer Joe Gallagher confirmed contracts had been signed. On 27 July, Sauerland announced the fight would take place at a 10,000 capacity arena at the King Abdullah Sports City Complex in Jeddah, Saudi Arabia on 28 September 2018.

It was reported the prize money on offer for the final was £6.1 million, with the winner taking a larger percentage.

There were four official judge's scorecards.

== The fight ==
The fight was closely fought throughout the opening 6 rounds with back and forth action. Early in the fight, Groves established his jab whilst trying to avoid any power shots from Smith, whilst Smith was connecting with his right hand. Smith had more success in round 3 after a counter-right hand buckled Groves legs. In round 6, Smith backed Groves against the ropes and landed two strong jabs. He later landed a clean left hook which forced Groves to move back. Midway through round 7, Groves landed two body shots, however leaving himself open, Smith landed a left hook, which again shook Groves and forced him to retreat backwards. Groves was hurt at this point and Smith went after Groves against the ropes and landed numerous shots, including a hard body shot and an uppercut, ultimately sending Groves to the canvas. Groves managed to get to one knee, before referee Luis Pabon finished the 10-count, giving Smith the 7th-round knockout. At the time of the stoppage, one judge had it even at 57–57, two judges had Groves ahead 59–55 and 58–56 and one judge had Smith ahead 59–55.

== Aftermath ==
Groves made no excuses, claiming the shoulder was never an issue in the fight. He also ruled out retirement. Rasheda Ali daughter of Muhammad Ali's presented Smith with the trophy.

On 28 January 2019, Groves announced his retirement from professional boxing, stating, "I don't want there to be a time where I'm 'too old' to box, or where injury retires me." In a long statement, he highlighted some career events and offered a prayer for Eduard Gutknecht.

== Undercard ==
Confirmed bouts:

== Broadcasting ==
Country	Broadcaster
Baltic & Nordic countries	Viasat
Belgium	VOO
Bulgaria	Nova
Canada	Super Channel
Germany	SAT.1
Russia	Match! Boets
Singapore	StarHub
Sub-Saharan Africa	TVMS
Turkey	Tivibu Sports
United Kingdom	ITV
United States	Audience
Ukraine	Inter

Preceded by vs. Chris Eubank Jr.	George Groves's bouts 28 September 2018	Retired
Preceded by vs. Nieky Holzken	Callum Smith's bouts 28 September 2018	Succeeded by vs. Hassan N'Dam N'Jikam
