= Canelo Álvarez vs. John Ryder =

2023 professional boxing match

The King is Coming Home
- Date: May 6, 2023
- Venue: Estadio Akron, Guadalajara, Mexico
- Title(s) on the line: WBA (Super), WBC, IBF, WBO The Ring and TBRB undisputed super middleweight titles

Tale of the tape
Boxer	Saúl Álvarez	John Ryder
Nickname	Canelo ("Cinnamon")	The Gorilla
Hometown	Guadalajara, Jalisco, Mexico	Islington, London, UK
Pre-fight record	58–2–2 (39 KO)	32–5 (18 KO)
Age	32 years, 9 months	34 years, 9 months
Height	5 ft 8 in (173 cm)	5 ft 9 in (175 cm)
Weight	167.4 lb (76 kg)	168 lb (76 kg)
Style	Orthodox	Southpaw
Recognition	WBA (Super), WBC, IBF, WBO, The Ring and TBRB undisputed Super Middleweight Champion; The Ring No. 5 ranked pound-for-pound fighter 4-division world champion	WBO; Interim Super Middleweight Champion; The Ring; No. 3 Ranked Super Middleweight; TBRB; No. 5 Ranked Super Middleweight

Result
- Álvarez wins via 12-round unanimous decision (120-107, 118-109, 118-109)

Canelo Álvarez vs. John Ryder, billed as The King is Coming Home, was a professional boxing match contested between Mexican boxer Canelo Álvarez, and British boxer John Ryder. The bout took place on May 6, 2023 in the Estadio Akron, Guadalajara, Mexico.

== Background ==
Álvarez's last fight was a trilogy bout against Gennady Golovkin, which he won via 12-round unanimous decision. On the other hand, Ryder's last fight was against Zach Parker at The O2 Arena, which he won via a 5th round corner retirement, gaining the interim title.

The fight was Álvarez's first in his native Mexico, in over 10 years, hence the billing "The King is coming home".

== The fight ==
Álvarez was dominant throughout the fight. He dropped Ryder in round 5 and frequently attacked with hooks to the body and combinations to the head. Álvarez won via unanimous decision.

== Aftermath ==
Ryder received praise for his durability for continuing to fight despite receiving a broken nose in the opening rounds.

== Fight card ==
Weight Class		vs.		Method	Round	Time	Notes
Super middleweight	(Mexico) Canelo Álvarez	def.	(United Kingdom) John Ryder	UD	12 (12)	3:00	^{Note 1}
Flyweight	(Mexico) Julio Cesar Martinez	def.	(Panama) Ronal Batista	KO/TKO	11 (12)	1:00	^{Note 2}
Super lightweight	(Mexico) Gabriel Gollaz Valenzuela	def.	(Australia) Steve Spark	SD	10 (10)	3:00	^{Note 3}
Light heavyweight	(Ukraine) Oleksandr Gvozdyk	def.	(Latvia) Ričards Bolotņiks	KO/TKO	6 (10)	1:06
Featherweight	(United States) Nathan Devon Rodriguez	def.	(Nicaragua) Alexander Mejia	MD	10 (10)	3:00
Light heavyweight	(Kazakhstan) Bek Nurmaganbet	def.	(Venezuela) Argenis Espana	KO/TKO	2 (8)	3:00
Super middleweight	(United States) Lawrence King	def.	(Argentina) Elio German Rafael	KO/TKO	2 (8)	1:30
Super middleweight	(Kazakhstan) Abilkhan Amankul	def.	(Mexico) Fabian Rios Frausto	KO/TKO	2 (8)	2:40
Super featherweight	(Mexico) Johansen Alvarez Suarez	def.	(Mexico) Johan Rodriguez Arreguin	UD	6 (6)	3:00
Super welterweight	(Mexico) Emiliano Rojo Vazquez	vs.	(Mexico) Fabian Trejo Rivera		4 (4)	3:00
Light flyweight	(Mexico) Jesus Larios	def.	(Mexico) Damian Efrain De La Torre Nunez	UD	4 (4)	3:00

^Note 1 For WBA (Super), WBC, IBF, WBO, and The Ring super middleweight titles
^Note 2 For WBC flyweight title
^Note 3 For WBA Inter-Continental Super lightweight title

== Broadcasting ==
Country/Region		Broadcasters		
Country/Region	Free	Cable TV	PPV	Stream
Mexico (Host)	Azteca 7			TV Azteca Deportes
Mexico (Host)	Canal 5			Vix+
Unsold markets (inc. UK)				DAZN
Australia			Main Event	
Canada			DAZN PPV	
United States			DAZN PPV	
Latin America		ESPN		Star+
Panama	Telemetro			Medcom Go

Preceded by vs. Gennady Golovkin III	Canelo Álvarez's bouts 6 May 2023	Succeeded by vs. Jermell Charlo
Preceded by vs. Zach Parker	John Ryder's bouts 6 May 2023	Succeeded by vs. Jaime Munguía
