= Boxxer =

British boxing promotional company

- Founder: Ben Shalom
- Website: Official website

Boxxer, stylised as BOXXER, is a British professional boxing promotional company.

== History ==
Founded by Ben Shalom, Boxxer began as Ultimate Boxxer, organising eight-man professional boxing elimination tournaments starting in April 2018 and preceding to host a total of six tournaments under the original name. In August 2020, Ultimate Boxxer rebranded to Boxxer, and announced its first signee; the winner of the Ultimate Boxxer 3 tournament, Derrick Osaze. The following month, and under the new branding, Boxxer announced its seventh tournament, "Boxxer Series 7", would take place in November 2020 with a new four-man elimination format.

In June 2021, it was announced that Boxxer had signed a four-year deal with Sky Sports. In September, Boxxer revealed their roster of fighters, including Hughie Fury, Savannah Marshall and Caroline Dubois, as well as co-promotional deals with Claressa Shields and Chris Eubank Jr. A co-promotional deal was also made with Bob Arum's Top Rank in regards to the world title fight between Josh Taylor and Jack Catterall. Boxxer's first event on Sky Sports was a co-promotion with Wasserman Boxing, featuring Eubank Jr. on 2 October 2021.

The most notable, high profile event associated with Boxxer was between domestic rivals Amir Khan and Kell Brook on 19 February 2022.

On 8 August 2025 it was announced that Boxxer had signed a deal with BBC Sport.

On 9 June 2026, it was announced that Boxxer had secured a new multi‑fight broadcast deal with DAZN. The deal allowed Boxxer to stage larger, globally distributed fight cards, and potentially deliver pay‑per‑view events later in 2026. It was also noted that the BBC deal would continue, meaning the company would operate across both free‑to‑air and global streaming platforms. The first event under the deal was scheduled to be a rematch between Callum Simpson and Troy Williamson on 8 August 2026.

== Boxxer Series ==
Under the name Ultimate Boxxer, the tournament originally featured eight fighters from a given weight competing in 3 x 3 minute rounds in one night, with the winner of the inaugural tournament being awarded £16,000 and a golden robe.

=== Ultimate Boxxer I ===
The inaugural tournament was held in the welterweight division and took place on 27 April 2018 at the Manchester Arena. The quarter-finals were streamed live on UNILAD's Facebook page while the semi-finals were and final were aired on 5Spike. The competitors were Andy Kremner (9–0), Isaac Macleod (9–0), Jimmy Cooper (6–0–1), Drew Brown (7–0), Ben Eland (4–0–1), Tom Young (4–0), Kaisee Benjamin (4–0), and Sam Evans (8–0–1). Brown emerged victorious after defeating Young in the final.

Quarter-finals
Drew Brown | TKO1
Jimmy Cooper
Sam Evans | UD
Kaisee Benjamin
Tom Young | UD
Ben Eland
Isaac Macleod | SD
Andy Kremner

Semi-finals
Drew Brown | SD
Sam Evans
Tom Young | TKO1
Isaac Macleod

Final
Drew Brown | UD
Tom Young

=== Ultimate Boxxer II ===
The second edition was held in the light-heavyweight division and took place on 2 November 2018 at the indigo at The O2. The prize money was increased to £50,000 with the winner also getting a chance to fight in an eliminator for the British title. The competitors were Joel McIntyre (17–2), Darrell Church (7–2–1), Sam Horsfall (2–1), Dec Spelman (12–1), Shakan Pitters (7–0), Sam Smith (4–1), Jordan Joseph (7–2–1), and Georgii Bacon (1–1), who was a late replacement for John McCallum. Pitters emerged victorious after defeating Spelmen in the final.

Quarter-finals
Joel McIntyre | UD
Darrell Church
Dec Spelman | TKO2
Sam Horsfall
Shakan Pitters | UD
Sam Smith
Georgii Bacon | SD
Jordan Joseph

Semi-finals
Joel McIntyre
Dec Spelman | MD
Shakan Pitters | KO2
Georgii Bacon

Final
Dec Spelman
Shakan Pitters | UD

=== Ultimate Boxxer III ===
Ultimate Boxxer III was held in the middleweight division and took place on 2 May 2019 at the indigo at The O2. The competitors were Tey Lynn-Jones (11–1), Kaan Hawes (4–0–1), Sean Phillips (5–0–1), Grant Dennis (12–1), Kieron Conway (9–0), Josh Groombridge (7–1), Derrick Osaze (6–0) and Joe Hurn (10–0–1). Osaze emerged victorious after defeating Dennis in the final.

Quarter-finals
Kieron Conway | UD
Kaan Hawes
Derrick Osaze | UD
Tey Lynn-Jones
Sean Phillips | TKO1
Josh Groombridge
Grant Dennis | TKO3
Joe Hurn

Semi-finals
Kieron Conway
Derrick Osaze | SD
Sean Phillips | UD
Grant Dennis

Final
Derrick Osaze | MD
Grant Dennis

=== Ultimate Boxxer IV ===
The fourth edition was held in the cruiserweight division and took place on 19 July 2019 at the Planet ice Arena in Altrincham. The competitors were Damian Chambers (7–0), Matt Sen (5–1), Mikael Lawal (9–0), Antony Woolery (1–0), Dan Cooper (7–0–1), David Jamieson (4–0), Tony Conquest (18–3) and Rhasian Earlington (5–0). Lawal emerged victorious after defeating Chambers in the final.

Quarter-finals
Mikael Lawal | MD
Antony Woolery
David Jamieson | SD
Dan Cooper
Rhasian Earlington | KO1
Tony Conquest
Damian Chambers | TKO1
Matt Sen

Semi-finals
Mikael Lawal | SD
David Jamieson
Rhasian Earlington
Damian Chambers | UD

Final
Mikael Lawal | TKO1
Damian Chambers

=== Ultimate Boxxer V ===
The fifth edition was held in the light-middleweight division and took place on 20 September 2019 at the indigo at The O2 in London, and was aired live on BT Sport. The competitors were Kingsley Egbunike (4–0), Lenny Fuller (6–0), Kaan Hawes (5–1–1), Joshua Ejakpovi (13–1), Lewis Syrett (6–0), Sean Robinson (9–0), Ish O'Connor (2–0) and Steven Donnelly (7–0). Donnelly emerged victorious after defeating Fuller in the final.

Quarter-finals
Lenny Fuller | TKO1
Kingsley Egbunike
Joshua Epakjovi | UD
Kaan Hawes
Sean Robinson | UD
Lewis Syrett
Steven Donnelly | TKO1
Ish O'Connor

Semi-finals
Lenny Fuller | UD
Joshua Ejakpovi
Sean Robinson
Steven Donnelly | UD

Final
Lenny Fuller
Steven Donnelly | TKO2

=== Ultimate Boxxer VI ===
The sixth edition was held in the heavyweight division and took place on 13 December 2019 at the Planet Ice Arena in Manchester. The participants were Nick Webb (13–2), Sean Turner (12–3), Mark Bennett (5–0), Jonathan Palata (7–0), Josh Sandland (4–1–1), Jay McFarlane (10–4), Kamil Sokolowski (7–15–2) and Chris Healey (8–6). Webb emerged victorious after defeating Bennett in the final.

Quarter-finals
Mark Bennett | SD
Jay McFarlane
Josh Sandland | UD
Kamil Sokolowski
Chris Healey
Nick Webb | SD
Danny Whitaker | UD
Jonathan Palata

Semi-finals
Mark Bennett | UD
Josh Sandland
Nick Webb | UD
Danny Whitaker

Final
Mark Bennett
Nick Webb | UD

=== Boxxer VII ===
The seventh edition of the tournament, now renamed Boxxer, employed a new four-man format. Taking place in the super-middleweight division, the event took place on 10 November 2020 at the BT Sport Studios in London. The participants were Zak Chelli (7–1–1), Harry Woods (4–0), Mike McGoldrick (6–0) and Vladimir Georgiev (4–0). Georgiev was brought in as a late replacement after Ben Ridings tested positive for COVID-19. Chelli emerged victorious after defeating McGoldrick in the final.

Semi-finals
Mike McGoldrick | UD
Harry Woods
Zak Chelli | UD
Vladimir Georgiev

Final
Mike McGoldrick
Zak Chelli | TKO2

== Current boxers ==
| Boxer | Nationality | Weight |
|---|---|---|
| Dan Azeez | (England) English | Light-heavyweight |
| Adam Azim | (England) English | Lightweight |
| Hassan Azim | (England) English | Light-welterweight |
| Joshua Buatsi | (England) English | Light-heavyweight |
| Zak Chelli | (England) English | Super-middleweight |
| Frazer Clarke | (England) English | Heavyweight |
| Caroline Dubois | (England) English | Lightweight |
| Scott Forrest | (Scotland) Scottish | Cruiserweight |
| Hughie Fury | (England) English | Heavyweight |
| Cori Gibbs | (England) English | Lightweight |
| April Hunter | (England) English | Welterweight |
| Natasha Jonas | (England) English | Super-lightweight |
| Ebonie Jones | (England) English | Super-bantamweight |
| Savannah Marshall | (England) English | Middleweight |
| Florian Marku | Albania | Welterweight |
| Georgia O'Connor | England | Light-middleweight |
| Joe Pigford | (England) English | Super-middleweight |
| Brad Rea | (England) English | Middleweight |
| Richard Riakporhe | (England) English | Cruiserweight |
| Dylan Cheema | (England) English | Lightweight |
| Viddal Riley | (England) English | Cruiserweight |
| Shakiel Thompson | (England) English | Middleweight |
| Jeamie 'TVK' Tshikeva | (England) English | Heavyweight |
| Anthony Yarde | (England) English | Light-heavyweight |
