= Jimmy Sains =

English boxer (born 2000)

Personal information
- Born: Jimmy Severn Sains; 8 December 2000 (age 25) Romford, Greater London, England
- Height: 6 ft 1 in (185 cm)
- Weight: Middleweight

Boxing career
- Stance: Southpaw

Boxing record
- Total fights: 13
- Wins: 13
- Win by KO: 10

Jimmy Severn Sains (born 8 December 2000) is an English professional boxer. He has held the Commonwealth middleweight title since August 2026 and was previously the English champion in the same weight division.

== Career ==
Signed to a promotional deal with Eddie Hearn led Matchroom Boxing, Sains made his professional debut at Wembley Arena in London on 30 September 2023, stopping Bartlomiej Stryczek in the third of their scheduled four-round contest.

Trained by Tony Sims, and with a perfect record of nine stoppage wins from nine fights, he faced Gideon Onyenani for the vacant Southern Area middleweight title at the Copper Box Arena in London on 17 May 2025. Taken the distance for the first time in his career, Sains won the 10-round bout via unanimous decision.

Sains faced Troy Coleman for the vacant English middleweight title at York Hall in London on 17 October 2025. He won when his opponent retired on his stool at the end of the fourth round.

He made a successful first defense of his title by defeating Derrick Osaze via majority decision at the Copper Box Arena in London on 21 March 2026. Two of the ringside judges scored the fight 97–93 and 96–94 respectively in his favour, while the third had it a 95–95 draw.

Having relinquished his English championship, Sains returned to the Copper Box Arena in London to face Tom Cowling for the vacant Commonwealth middleweight title on 22 August 2026. He won by unanimous decision.
