= George Liddard =

English boxer (born 2002)

Personal information
- Born: 30 May 2002 (age 24) Billericay, Essex, England
- Height: 5 ft 10 in (178 cm)
- Weight: Middleweight

Boxing career
- Stance: Orthodox

Boxing record
- Total fights: 15
- Wins: 15
- Win by KO: 9

George Liddard (born 30 May 2002) is an English professional boxer. He has held the British middleweight title since October 2025 and the European title in the same weight division since August 2026. Liddard was previously the Commonwealth middleweight champion. He is the youngest boxer to hold the British and Commonwealth middleweight titles, having won them aged 23.

== Career ==
Liddard made his professional debut at Wembley Arena in London on 26 November 2022, stopping Nikola Matic in the second of their scheduled four-round contest.

Unbeaten in his first nine pro-fights, he stopped Omar Ilunga in the opening round at York Hall in London on 13 December 2024.

In his next outing, Liddard defeated Derrick Osaze via unanimous decision at Indigo at the O2 in London on 31 January 2025, to win the vacant Commonwealth Silver middleweight title.

He faced Aaron Sutton in a final eliminator for a shot at the British middleweight title at the Copper Box Arena in London on 17 May 2025. Liddard knocked his opponent to the canvas three times during the fight which was eventually stopped in the fifth round when Sutton's corner threw in the towel.

Liddard challenged British and Commonwealth middleweight champion Kieron Conway at York Hall in London on 17 October 2025. He won by stoppage in the 10th round when his opponent's corner threw in the towel, having seen their fighter knocked to the canvas in the previous round and then faced with a series of unanswered blows. Aged 23 at the time, Liddard became the youngest British and Commonwealth middleweight title holder in history.

He made the first defence of his titles against Tyler Denny at the Copper Box Arena in London on 21 March 2026. Liddard won via unanimous decision to retain his championships and also claim the vacant IBF Intercontinental middleweight title.

Having vacated his Commonwealth championship, Liddard was scheduled to face Dario Morello for the vacant European middleweight title at York Hall in London on 22 August 2026. A week before the fight it was switched to take place at the Copper Box Arena in London with promotors Matchroom Boxing stating that "temporary issues" with York Hall meant it was "no longer a viable venue." Liddard knocked his opponent to the canvas in the eighth round and won when Morello's corner retired him at the end of the round.

Liddard is scheduled to challenge IBO middleweight champion Michel Soro at Salle des Étoiles in Monte Carlo, Monaco, on 12 December 2026.

== Professional boxing record ==
| 15 fights | 15 wins | 0 losses |
|---|---|---|
| By knockout | 9 | 0 |
| By decision | 6 | 0 |

| No. | Result | Record | Opponent | Type | Round, time | Date | Location | Notes |
|---|---|---|---|---|---|---|---|---|
| 15 | Win | 15–0 | Dario Morello | RTD | 8 (12), 3:00 | 22 Aug 2026 | Copper Box Arena, London, England | Won vacant European middleweight title |
| 14 | Win | 14–0 | Tyler Denny | UD | 12 | 21 Mar 2026 | Copper Box Arena, London, England | Retained British and Commonwealth middleweight titles, won vacant IBF Intercontinental middleweight title |
| 13 | Win | 13–0 | Kieron Conway | TKO | 10 (12), 0:49 | 17 Oct 2025 | York Hall, London, England | Won British and Commonwealth middleweight titles |
| 12 | Win | 12–0 | Aaron Sutton | TKO | 5 (10), 2:20 | 17 May 2025 | Copper Box Arena, London, England | Retained Commonwealth Silver middleweight title |
| 11 | Win | 11–0 | Derrick Osaze | UD | 10 | 31 Jan 2025 | Indigo at the O2, Greenwich, London, England | Won Commonwealth Silver middleweight title |
| 10 | Win | 10–0 | Omar Nguale Llunga | TKO | 1 (10), 1:32 | 13 Dec 2024 | York Hall, Bethnal Green, England | |
| 9 | Win | 9–0 | George Davey | TKO | 5 (8),2:20 | 28 Sept 2024 | Park Community Arena, Sheffield, England | |
| 8 | Win | 8–0 | SA Smith | PTS | 6 | 29 June 2024 | Brentwood Centre, Brentwood, Essex, England | |
| 7 | Win | 7–0 | Graham McCormack | KO | 1 (8), 1:28 | 25 May 2024 | First Direct Arena, Leeds, England | |
| 6 | Win | 6–0 | Andrew Buchanan | UD | 6 | 3 Feb 2024 | Cosmopolitan of Las Vegas, Chelsea Ballroom, Las Vegas, USA | |
| 5 | Win | 5–0 | Peter Kramer | PTS | 6 | 30 Sept 2023 | Wembley Arena, London, England | |
| 4 | Win | 4–0 | Bas Oosterweghal | PTS | 6 | 12 Aug 2023 | O2 Arena, London, England | |
| 3 | Win | 3–0 | Nikolas Dzurnak | TKO | 1 (6), 2:29 | 10 June 2023 | Wembley Arena, London, England | |
| 2 | Win | 2–0 | Daniel Przewieslik | TKO | 3 (4), 2:32 | 11 Mar 2023 | M&S Bank Arena, Liverpool, England | |
| 1 | Win | 1–0 | Nikola Matic | TKO | 2 (4), 0:25 | 26 Nov 2022 | Wembley Arena, London, England | |
