= Christian Martinoli =

Mexican sports journalist and narrator

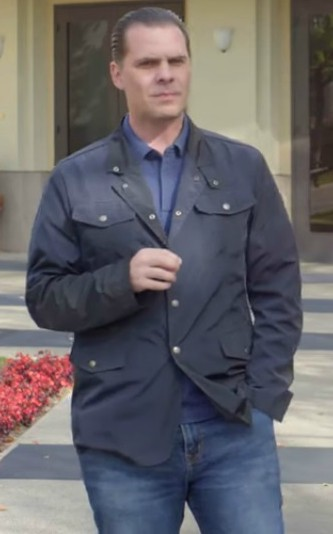
- Martinoli in 2019
- Born: 15 October 1975 (age 50); Mar del Plata, Argentina
- Occupation: Sports journalist
- Employer: Azteca Deportes

Christian Octavio Martinoli Curi (born 15 October 1975) is a Mexican sports journalist and sports commentator who currently works for Azteca Deportes. His father is from Argentina and his mother from Mexico. He is also of Italian descent.

He is recognized for expressing his opinion about players when he commentates games. It can be from the Mexican First Division, the UEFA Champions League, and the Mexico national team.

In most cases, he works with former professional footballers Luis García, Jorge Campos and Zague. He also participates, along with Luis García, in the Pro Evolution Soccer video game franchise.
