= Canelo Álvarez vs. Billy Joe Saunders =

2021 professional boxing match

Face The Fearless
- Date: May 8, 2021
- Venue: AT&T Stadium, Arlington, Texas, U.S.
- Title(s) on the line: WBA (Super), WBC, WBO, and The Ring super middleweight titles

Tale of the tape
Boxer	Saúl Álvarez	Billy Joe Saunders
Nickname	Canelo ("Cinnamon")	Superb
Hometown	Guadalajara, Jalisco, Mexico	Welwyn Garden City, Hertfordshire, UK
Pre-fight record	55–1–2 (37 KO)	30–0 (14 KO)
Age	30 years, 9 months	31 years, 8 months
Height	5 ft 8 in (173 cm)	5 ft 11 in (180 cm)
Weight	167 2/5 lb (76 kg)	167 4/5 lb (76 kg)
Style	Orthodox	Southpaw
Recognition	WBA (Super), WBC, and The Ring; Super Middleweight Champion; TBRB; No. 1 Ranked Super Middleweight; The Ring No. 1 ranked pound-for-pound fighter 4-division world champion	WBO; Super Middleweight Champion; The Ring; No. 4 Ranked Super Middleweight; TBRB; No. 6 Ranked Super Middleweight; 2-division world champion

Result
- Álvarez wins via 8th-round RTD

Canelo Álvarez vs. Billy Joe Saunders, billed as Face the Fearless, was a super middleweight professional boxing match contested between WBA (Super), WBC, and The Ring champion, Canelo Álvarez, and WBO champion Billy Joe Saunders. The bout took place on May 8, 2021, at AT&T Stadium in Arlington, Texas. Álvarez defeated Saunders via eighth-round corner retirement.

With an official attendance of 73,126, it was reported to have surpassed Leon Spinks vs. Muhammad Ali II as the most-attended boxing event at an indoor venue in U.S. history, as well as the largest U.S. gathering since the beginning of the COVID-19 pandemic.

== Background ==
The fight between the pair was previously planned for May 2, 2020, in Las Vegas, before the COVID-19 pandemic brought the sport to a halt. Álvarez planned to stage his next fight on September 12, again in Las Vegas, with Billy Joe Saunders, Callum Smith and a Gennady Golovkin trilogy all being possible. However, Álvarez refused to take a pay cut off his deal with streaming service DAZN and Golden Boy Promotions. Unable to agree on an opponent and with DAZN unwilling to pay, Álvarez sued DAZN, as well as Golden Boy Promotion's founder Oscar De La Hoya for breach of contract and sought at least $280 million, the remainder of what he was owed on his deal. According to the lawsuit, De La Hoya would be liable for the money. On 6 November 2020, Álvarez was released from his contract with Golden Boy Promotions after a lawsuit was settled. In December 2020, Álvarez won the unified title against Callum Smith in San Antonio, Texas, and defended it against WBC mandatory Avni Yıldırım in February 2021 in Miami.

In July 2020, Saunders ruled himself out of a September showdown with Álvarez, citing he would not be 'ready' in time.

Canelo vs. Saunders was agreed before Álvarez's fight with Yıldırım, and was officially announced shortly after. The AT&T Stadium in Dallas was announced as a venue a few weeks later.

== The fight ==
The fight was close and competitive for the first seven rounds, with most giving the early rounds to Canelo and the middle rounds to Saunders. A right uppercut from Álvarez in round eight reportedly caused a right orbital bone fracture, leaving Saunders unwilling to come out of his corner for the ninth round. As a result Saunders was taken to a hospital post-fight. According to CompuBox, Álvarez outlanded Saunders during the fight, landing 73 of 206 punches (35.4%), with Saunders landing 60 of 284 (21.1%). Throughout the fight, Álvarez landed 52.7% of his power punches.

== Aftermath ==
At the post-fight interview, Álvarez made it clear he wanted to become undisputed in the super-middleweight division, calling out IBF titleholder Caleb Plant. During the post-fight press conference, WBO middleweight champion Demetrius Andrade, asked about a potential bout, with Álvarez dismissing the idea. They exchanged heated words before Andrade was escorted out by security.

== Fight card ==
Confirmed bouts:

Weight Class		vs.		Method	Round	Time	Notes
Super middleweight	(Mexico) Canelo Álvarez (c)	def.	(United Kingdom) Billy Joe Saunders (c)	RTD	8/12	3:00	^{Note 1}
Junior flyweight	(Mexico) Elwin Soto (c)	def.	(Japan) Katsunari Takayama	TKO	9/12	2:44	^{Note 2}
Super welterweight	(France) Souleymane Cissokho	def.	(United Kingdom) Kieron Conway (c)	SD	10		^{Note 3}
Heavyweight	(Cuba) Frank Sánchez	def.	(Dominican Republic) Nagy Aguilera	TD	6/10	1:42
Preliminary Card
Featherweight	(United States) Marc Castro	def.	(Mexico) Irving Macias Castillo	TKO	4/6	2:04
Lightweight	(United States) Keyshawn Davis	def.	(Mexico) Jose Antonio Meza	UD	6
Welterweight	(Mexico) Christian Alan Gomez Duran	def.	(United States) Xavier Wilson	TKO	2/8	2:19
Welterweight	(United States) Kelvin Davis	def.	(Czech Republic) Jan Marsalek	UD	4

^Note 1 For WBA (Super), WBC, WBO, and The Ring super middleweight titles
^Note 2 For WBO junior flyweight title
^Note 3 For WBA Intercontinental super welterweight title

== Broadcasting ==
Country	Broadcaster
Mexico	Azteca

Preceded by vs. Avni Yıldırım	Canelo Álvarez's bouts 8 May 2021	Succeeded by vs. Caleb Plant
Preceded by vs. Martin Murray	Billy Joe Saunders's bouts 8 May 2021	Succeeded by vs. TBA
