= Kieron Conway =

English boxer (born 1996)

Personal information
- Nickname: Too Class
- Born: 2 May 1996 (age 30) Northampton, England
- Height: 5 ft 11 1/2 in (182 cm)
- Weight: Light-middleweight; Middleweight; Super-middleweight

Boxing career
- Stance: Orthodox

Boxing record
- Total fights: 29
- Wins: 23
- Win by KO: 7
- Losses: 5
- Draws: 1

Kieron Conway (born 2 May 1996) is an English professional boxer who is a former British and Commonwealth middleweight champion.

== Professional career ==
Conway made his professional debut on 25 February 2017, scoring a four-round points decision (PTS) victory against Sonny Whiting at the Civic Hall in Bedworth, Warwickshire.

After scoring five more wins, two by stoppage, he defeated Chris Monaghan via seventh-round technical knockout (TKO) to capture the British Challenge middleweight title on 9 March 2018 at The Deco in Northampton.

Following another three wins, he participated in the Ultimate Boxxer III tournament on 10 May 2019 at the indigo at The O2. Conway won his first bout of the evening, defeating Kaan Hawes via unanimous decision (UD) over three rounds with all three judges scoring the bout 30–27. In his second bout, which served as the semi-finals of the tournament, Conway suffered the first defeat of his career, losing via three-round split decision (SD) against Derrick Osaze. One judge scored the bout 29–28 in favour of Conway while the other two scored it 29–28 to Osaze.

He bounced back from defeat on 25 May 2019 with a four-round PTS victory against Harry Matthews, before challenging British super-welterweight champion Ted Cheeseman on 21 June 2019 at the York Hall in London. Conway was forced to fight off the back foot for the majority of the fight as Cheeseman took the aggressor's role. After twelve closely contested rounds the bout was ruled a draw to see Cheeseman retain his British title. One judge scored the bout 116–113 in favour of Conway, the second scored it 115–114 to Cheeseman, while the third scored it even at 114–114. The following month it was announced that Conway had signed a promotional contract with Eddie Hearn's Matchroom Boxing.

Conway ended 2019 with points victories against Konrad Stempkowski in October and Craig O'Brien in December, before facing his friend and former sparring partner Navid Mansouri for the vacant WBA Inter-Continental super-welterweight title on 14 August 2020 at Matchroom Sport's headquarters in Brentwood, Essex. The first three rounds were evenly contested with both men staying behind their jabs and picking their moments to throw a right hand. Conway began to take a hold of the fight in the fourth, landing a right hand to knock Mansouri into the ropes. The fifth and sixth rounds saw much of the same with Conway finishing the rounds strong. In the seventh, Conway had Mansouri in trouble after landing a two punch combination followed by a flurry of clean punches. Conway pushed for the stoppage in the final few rounds as Mansouri fought defensively. After the final bell rang, Conway was awarded the victory via UD to capture the WBA regional title. One judge scored the bout 99–92 and the other two scored it 98–92.

His final fight of 2020 was originally scheduled to be against Olympic bronze medallist Souleymane Cissokho on 12 December at The SSE Arena in London, with the bout serving as part of the undercard for Anthony Joshua vs. Kubrat Pulev. However, after Cissokho withdrew from the bout due to "administrative issues", Macaulay McGowan was brought in as a late replacement. With the event being televised live on Sky Sports Box Office in the UK and Ireland, and streamed live on DAZN in more than 200 countries, Conway knocked McGowan to the canvas in the eighth round en route to a shutout unanimous decision victory over 10 rounds. Two judges scored the bout 100–89 and the third scored it 100–90.

Conway fought Linus Udofia for the vacant WBA Intercontinental middleweight title at Sheffield Arena on 7 October 2023. He won when the referee stopped the bout at the start of the sixth round on the advice of the ringside doctor due to one of his opponent's eyes being swollen shut.

On 15 July 2024 at Yamato Arena in Suita, Japan, he defeated Ainiwaer Yilixiati by technical knockout in the seventh round of their quarter-final bout at Prizefighter 2024.

Conway claimed the vacant Commonwealth middleweight title via a split decision win over Ryan Kelly at Resort World Arena in Birmingham on 30 November 2024.

He made the first defense of his championship against Gerome Warburton at the Copper Box Arena in London on 17 May 2025, with the vacant British middleweight title also on the line. Conway won by stoppage in the fourth round.

Conway defended his titles against George Liddard at York Hall in London on 17 October 2025. He lost by stoppage in the 10th round when his corner threw in the towel, having seen their fighter knocked to the canvas in the previous round and then faced with a series of unanswered blows.

After 11 months away from the competitive boxing ring, Conway moved up in weight divisions to super-middleweight and made his return against Mark Jeffers in a 10 round bout at Co-op Live in Manchester on 19 September 2026. He lost via unanimous decision.

== Professional boxing record ==
29 fights	23 wins	5 losses
By knockout	7	1
By decision	16	4
Draws	1	

No.	Result	Record	Opponent	Type	Round, time	Date	Location	Notes
29	Loss	23–5–1	Mark Jeffers	UD	10	19 Sep 2026	Co-op Live, Manchester, England	
28	Loss	23–4–1	George Liddard	TKO	10 (12), 0:49	17 Oct 2025	York Hall, London, England	Lost British and Commonwealth middleweight titles
27	Win	23–3–1	Gerome Warburton	TKO	4 (12), 1:26	17 May 2025	Copper Box Arena, London, England	Won vacant British middleweight title and retained Commonwealth middleweight title
26	Win	22–3–1	Ryan Kelly	SD	12	30 Nov 2024	Resort World Arena, Birmingham, England	Won vacant Commonwealth middleweight title
25	Win	21–3–1	Ainiwaer Yilixiati	TKO	7 (10), 2:13	15 Jul 2024	Yamato Arena, Suita, Japan	
24	Win	20–3–1	Linus Udofia	TKO	6 (12), 0:02	7 Oct 2023	Sheffield Arena, Sheffield, England	Won vacant WBA Inter-Continental middleweight title
23	Win	19–3–1	Jorge Silva	PTS	8	18 Feb 2023	Nottingham Arena, Nottingham, England	
22	Loss	18–3–1	Austin Williams	UD	10	17 Sep 2022	T-Mobile Arena, Las Vegas, US	For vacant WBA International middleweight title
21	Win	18–2–1	Gregory Trenel	TKO	5 (8), 2:22	6 Aug 2022	Sheffield Arena, Sheffield, England	
20	Win	17–2–1	James Metcalf	UD	10	9 Oct 2021	Liverpool Arena, Liverpool, England	
19	Loss	16–2–1	Souleymane Cissokho	SD	10	8 May 2021	AT&T Stadium, Arlington, Texas, US	Lost WBA Inter-Continental super-welterweight title
18	Win	16–1–1	Macaulay McGowan	UD	10	12 Dec 2020	The SSE Arena, London, England	
17	Win	15–1–1	Navid Mansouri	UD	10	14 Aug 2020	Matchroom Sport Headquarters, Brentwood, England	Won vacant WBA Inter-Continental super-welterweight title
16	Win	14–1–1	Craig O'Brien	PTS	10	19 Dec 2019	York Hall, London, England	
15	Win	13–1–1	Konrad Stempkowski	PTS	8	19 Oct 2019	Utilita Arena, Newcastle, England	
14	Draw	12–1–1	Ted Cheeseman	SD	12	21 Jun 2019	York Hall, London, England	For British super-welterweight title
13	Win	12–1	Harry Matthews	PTS	4	25 May 2019	The Deco, Northampton, England	
12	Loss	11–1	Derrick Osaze	UD	3	10 May 2019	indigo at The O2, London, England	Ultimate Boxxer III – semi-final
11	Win	11–0	Kaan Hawes	UD	3	10 May 2019	indigo at The O2, London, England	Ultimate Boxxer III – quarter-final
10	Win	10–0	Gabor Gorbics	PTS	8	2 Mar 2019	East of England Arena, Peterborough, England	
9	Win	9–0	Gino Kanters	PTS	4	8 Sep 2018	Arena Birmingham, Birmingham, England	
8	Win	8–0	Geiboord Omier	PTS	4	13 Jul 2018	York Hall, London, England	
7	Win	7–0	Chris Monaghan	TKO	7 (8), 1:54	9 Mar 2018	The Deco, Northampton, England	Won BPA British Classic Challenge middleweight title
6	Win	6–0	Andrej Cepur	TKO	4 (4), 1:55	3 Feb 2018	Holiday Inn at Birmingham Airport, Birmingham, England	
5	Win	5–0	Casey Blair	TKO	2 (6), 2:33	2 Dec 2017	Brentwood Centre, Brentwood, England	
4	Win	4–0	Christian Gomez	PTS	6	29 Sep 2017	The Deco, Northampton, England	
3	Win	3–0	Jan Balog	PTS	4	13 May 2017	Barclaycard Arena, Birmingham, England	
2	Win	2–0	Kevin McCauley	PTS	4	18 Mar 2017	Holte Suite at Villa Park, Birmingham, England	
1	Win	1–0	Sonny Whiting	PTS	4	25 Feb 2017	Civic Hall, Bedworth, England	
