= Marc Castro =

American boxer

Personal information
- Nationality: American
- Born: August 19, 1999 (age 26) Fresno, California, U.S.
- Height: 5 ft 7 in (170 cm)
- Weight: Super featherweight

Boxing career
- Reach: 70 in (178 cm)
- Stance: Orthodox

Boxing record
- Total fights: 14
- Wins: 13
- Win by KO: 8
- Losses: 1
Medal record
Men's amateur boxing
Representing United States
Youth World Championships
Gold medal – first place	2016 St. Petersburg	Bantamweight
Junior World Championships
Gold medal – first place	2015 St. Petersburg	Bantamweight

Marc Anthony Castro (born August 19, 1999) is an American professional boxer. As an amateur, he won gold medals at the 2015 Junior World Championships and 2016 Youth World Championships, both at bantamweight.

== Early life ==
Castro was born and raised in Fresno, California. His mother, Lorena Camacho, was born in Mexicali, Mexico and raised in Fresno, Ca., while his father, Tony Castro, is a Salvadoran refugee from San Miguel. He started training as a boxer under his father at the age of four.

Castro graduated as valedictorian of Sunnyside High School in 2017 and went on to attend Fresno State University.

== Amateur career ==
As an amateur, Castro compiled a record of 177–7. He was a two-time amateur world champion, 16-time national champion, three-time National Silver Gloves champion, and two-time National Junior Olympics Champion.

== Professional career ==
Castro had his eyes set on the 2020 Olympics; however a last-minute illness forced him to pull out of the Team USA qualifiers. He considered participating for his parents' home nations of Mexico or El Salvador before ultimately deciding to sign with Matchroom Boxing and become professional.

=== Super featherweight ===
Castro's professional debut was twice postponed; once due to the COVID-19 pandemic and another after Castro contracted COVID-19. His debut finally came on December 19, 2020, against Luis Javier Valdes. The bout was placed on the main card of Canelo Álvarez vs. Callum Smith at the Alamodome in San Antonio, Texas. Castro won via third-round knockout.

== Professional boxing record ==
11 fights	11 wins	0 losses
By knockout	8	0
By decision	3	0

No.	Result	Record	Opponent	Type	Round, time	Date	Location	Notes
10	Win	10–0	Ricardo Lopez Torres	TKO	7 (8), 2:22	Apr 8, 2023	Boeing Center at Tech Port, San Antonio, Texas, U.S.	
9	Win	9–0	Maickol Lopez Villagrana	UD	8	Dec 3, 2022	Desert Diamond Arena, Glendale, Arizona, U.S.	
8	Win	8–0	Kevin Montiel Mendoza	KO	5 (8), 1:40	Sep 17, 2022	T-Mobile Arena, Paradise, Nevada, U.S.	
7	Win	7–0	Pedro Vicente Scharbaai	UD	6	May 7, 2022	T-Mobile Arena, Paradise, Nevada, U.S.	
6	Win	6–0	Julio Madera	UD	6	Mar 5, 2022	Pechanga Arena, San Diego, California, U.S.	
5	Win	5–0	Ronaldo Solis	TKO	2 (6), 0:43	Dec 4, 2021	MGM Grand Garden Arena, Las Vegas, Nevada, U.S.	
4	Win	4–0	Angel Luna	TKO	1 (6), 2:41	Oct 16, 2021	Chukchansi Park, Fresno, California, U.S.	
3	Win	3–0	Irving Macias Castillo	TKO	4 (6), 2:04	May 8, 2021	AT&T Stadium, Arlington, Texas, U.S.	
2	Win	2–0	John Moraga	TKO	2 (4), 2:29	Feb 27, 2021	Hard Rock Stadium, Miami Gardens, Florida, U.S.	
1	Win	1–0	Luis Javier Valdes	KO	3 (4), 1:12	Dec 19, 2020	Alamodome, San Antonio, Texas, U.S.	
