= Derrick Osaze =

British boxer (born 1993)

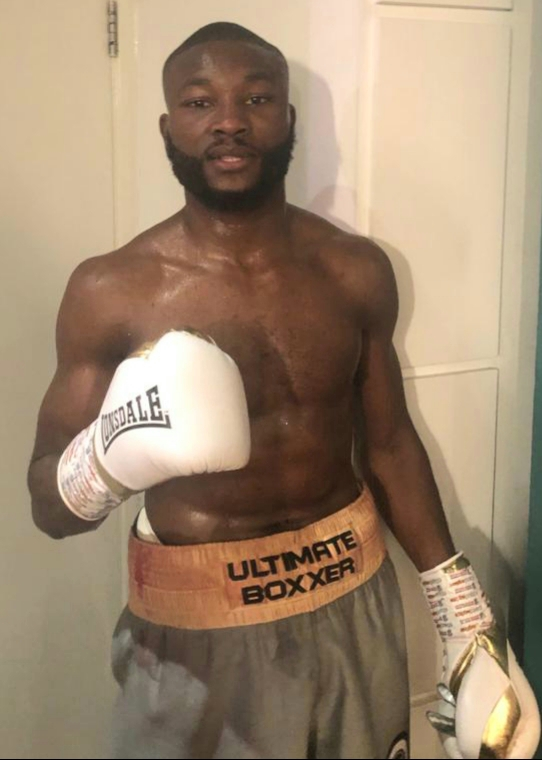
- Osaze in 2019

Personal information
- Nicknames: DelBoy; Punching Preacher
- Nationality: British
- Born: Derrick Osazemwinde; 11 October 1993 (age 32) Peckham, London, England
- Weight: Middleweight; Super-middleweight
- Website: http://www.delboyosaze.com

Boxing career
- Stance: Orthodox

Boxing record
- Total fights: 17
- Wins: 13
- Win by KO: 3
- Losses: 4

Derrick Osazemwinde (born 11 October 1993) is a British professional boxer. He became Ultimate Boxxer III middleweight champion in 2019.

Osaze was born and raised in Peckham, London, but is now based in Nottingham where he also preaches at the God's Vineyard Ministry where he was ordained as a minister in 2018.

== Early life ==
Osaze was born and raised in Peckham, South East London, and is the fifth born of six children. Aged 15, having been excluded from school thirteen times and on the verge of being permanently expelled due to anger management issues, he turned to Boxing in 2009 after it was recommended to him by a friend who said it would be a great way to channel his energy positively. He quickly fell in love with the sport and repeatedly states "God led to me Boxing which ultimately saved my life, the sport has taught me so much, the biggest lesson being self-discipline, it's positively shaped my character and kept me out of trouble". He states, "Boxing went from a hobby, to a passion and now it's a lifestyle". Convinced by his parents to focus on finishing his GCSEs and A-Levels first. He would wait four years to have his first competitive bout aged 19 in 2013 for Phoenix ABC in Nottingham. He attended Nottingham Trent University, where he gained a BA (Hons) in Business Management and a Master's in Sport Psychology.

== Amateur career ==
As an amateur Osaze won two national titles and one regional title in the process. He narrowly missed out on becoming a member of the England squad due to injury and was also in contention to represent Nigeria and attempt to qualify for the Rio 2016 Olympic Games after receiving a call up from the national head coach. He entered the professional ranks with 19 amateur fights.

== Professional career ==
Osaze turned professional in 2017 under the tutelage of his coaches, former professional boxers; Barrington Brown, Mark Howell, and boxing manager Jimmy Gill who all believed that his fighting style was better suited to the pro ranks. He would make his professional debut on 16 December 2017 when he fought Callum Ide at the Bingham Leisure Centre. Osaze won the fight via points decision.

Osaze won the Ultimate Boxxer III tournament on 10 May 2019 at The O2 in London. He defeated Tey Lynn Jones in his first bout, dropping Jones in the second round to secure a unanimous decision (UD) victory. He then followed that up by defeating pre-tournament favourite Kieron Conway via split decision (SD) in the semi-final. He then overcame Grant Dennis in the final, securing a majority decision (MD) helped by a third-round knockdown.

He challenged WBO International middleweight champion Denzel Bentley at York Hall in London on 17 August 2024, losing by technical knockout in the second round.

Osaze fought George Liddard for the vacant Commonwealth Silver middleweight title at Indigo at the O2 in London on 31 January 2025, but lost by unanimous decision.

He challenged English middleweight champion Jimmy Sains at the Copper Box Arena in London on 21 March 2026. Osaze lost via majority decision with two of the ringside judges scoring the fight 97–93 and 96–94 respectively for his opponent, while the third had it a 95–95 draw.

== Professional boxing record ==
17 fights	13 wins	4 losses
By knockout	3	1
By decision	10	3

No.	Result	Record	Opponent	Type	Round, time	Date	Location	Notes
17	Loss	13–4	(United Kingdom) Jimmy Sains	MD	10	21 Mar 2026	(United Kingdom) Copper Box Arena, London, England	For English middleweight title
16	Loss	13–3	(United Kingdom) George Liddard	UD	10	31 Jan 2025	(United Kingdom) Indigo at the O2, London, England	For vacant Commonwealth Silver middleweight title
15	Loss	13–2	(United Kingdom) Denzel Bentley	TKO	2 (10), 2:27	17 Aug 2024	(United Kingdom) York Hall, London, England	For WBO International middleweight title
14	Win	13–1	(Colombia) Joel Julio	TKO	3 (8), 2:02	30 Mar 2024	Arena Sofia, Sofia, Bulgaria	
13	Win	12–1	(United Kingdom) Darryl Sharp	PTS	6	4 Mar 2023	(United Kingdom) Harvey Hadden Sports Village, Nottingham, England	
12	Win	11–1	(Mexico) Fernando Valencia	PTS	6	8 Oct 2022	(United Kingdom) Harvey Hadden Sports Village, Nottingham, England	
11	Loss	10–1	(United Kingdom) Tyler Denny	PTS	10	11 June 2021	(United Kingdom) Sheffield Arena car park, Sheffield, England, U.K.	
10	Win	10–0	(Czech Republic) Rene Molik	TKO	2 (4), 2:50	20 Sep 2019	(United Kingdom) The O2, London, England	
9	Win	9–0	(United Kingdom) Grant Dennis	MD	3	10 May 2019	(United Kingdom) The O2, London, England	Ultimate Boxxer III – final
8	Win	8–0	(United Kingdom) Kieron Conway	SD	3	10 May 2019	(United Kingdom) The O2, London, England	Ultimate Boxxer III – semi-final
7	Win	7–0	(United Kingdom) Tey Lynn-Jones	UD	3	10 May 2019	(United Kingdom) The O2, London, England	Ultimate Boxxer III – quarter-final
6	Win	6–0	(United Kingdom) Callum Ide	PTS	4	6 Oct 2018	(United Kingdom) York Hall, London, England	
5	Win	5–0	(United Kingdom) Harry Matthews	PTS	4	14 Jul 2018	(United Kingdom) York Hall, London, England	
4	Win	4–0	(United Kingdom) Liam Hunt	PTS	4	8 Jun 2018	(United Kingdom) Dolman Exhibition Hall, Bristol, England	
3	Win	3–0	(United Kingdom) Jacob Lucas	KO	1 (4), 1:08	31 Mar 2018	(United Kingdom) Harvey Hadden Sports Village, Nottingham, England	
2	Win	2–0	(Italy) Victor Edagha	PTS	4	10 Mar 2018	(United Kingdom) Camden Centre, London, England	
1	Win	1–0	(United Kingdom) Callum Ide	PTS	4	16 Dec 2017	(United Kingdom) Bingham Leisure Centre, Bingham, England	
