= Zaquin Moses =

American boxer (born 2005)

Personal information
- Nickname: Zaybop
- Born: April 25, 2005 (age 21) Newark, New Jersey, U.S.
- Height: 5 ft 9 in (1.75 m)
- Weight: Super-featherweight

Boxing career
- Stance: Southpaw

Boxing record
- Total fights: 8
- Wins: 8
- Win by KO: 4
- Losses: 0
- Draws: 0

Zaquin Moses (born April 25, 2005) is an American professional boxer. He currently competes in the super featherweight division.

== Amateur career ==
Moses had a very successful amateur career. He was a three time national champion and also picked up a win against fellow highly rated prospect Curmel Moton in 2023.

== Professional career ==
Moses signed with Matchroom Boxing and made his pro debut on the undercard of Jaron Ennis vs Karen Chukhadzhian II in Philadelphia. He outclassed his American opponent Michael Ruiz for a comfortable points win In his second fight he featured on the undercard of Diego Pacheco vs Steven Nelson at the Chelsea Ballroom in Las Vegas. He stopped Mexican Mario Garcia in the first round. Moses is a cousin of current WBC lightweight champion Shakur Stevenson

== Professional boxing record ==
8 fights	8 wins	0 losses
By knockout	4	0
By decision	4	0
Draws	0	
No contests	0	

No.	Result	Record	Opponent	Type	Round, time	Date	Location	Notes
8	Win	8–0	(Mexico) Angel Antonio Contreras	RTD	5 (8), 3:00	4 Sep 2026	(United States) Prudential Center, Newark,New Jersey,U.S	
7	Win	7–0	(United States) Travis Crawford	UD	6	30 May 2026	(United States) Fertitta Center, Houston, Texas,U.S	
6	Win	6–0	(Argentina) Leandro Damian Medina	UD	4	24 Jan 2026	(United States) Fontainebleau, Las Vegas,Nevada,U.S	
5	Win	5–0	(United States) Antonio Duntenel Jr.	UD	4	11 Oct 2025	(United States) Wells Fargo Center, Philadelphia,Pennsylvania,U.S	
4	Win	4–0	(United States) Carl Rogers	TKO	4 (4), 1:51	14 Jun 2025	(United States) Madison Square Garden Theatre, New York,New York,U.S	
3	Win	3–0	(United States) Alex Pallette	TKO	2 (4), 2:13	12 Apr 2025	(United States) Boardwalk Hall, Atlantic City,New Jersey,U.S	
2	Win	2–0	(Mexico) Mario Garcia	RTD	1 (4), 3:00	25 Jan 2025	(United States) Chelsea Ballroom, Las Vegas,Nevada,U.S	
1	Win	1–0	(United States) Michael Ruiz	UD	4	9 Nov 2024	(United States) Wells Fargo Center,Philadelphia, U.S.	
