= George Groves vs. Chris Eubank Jr =

Boxing match

George Groves vs Chris Eubank Jr
- Date: 17 February 2018
- Venue: Manchester Arena, Manchester
- Title(s) on the line: WBA (Super) super middleweight title

Tale of the tape
Boxer	(United Kingdom) George Groves	(United Kingdom) Chris Eubank Jr
Nickname	"Saint George"	"Next Gen"
Hometown	Hammersmith, London	Brighton, East Sussex
Purse	£1,500,000	£1,500,000
Pre-fight record	27–3 (20 KO)	26–1 (20 KO)
Age	29 years, 10 months	28 years, 4 months
Height	5 ft 11 1/2 in (182 cm)	5 ft 11 in (180 cm)
Weight	166 3/4 lb (76 kg)	167 1/4 lb (76 kg)
Style	Orthodox	Orthodox
Recognition	WBA; Super Middleweight Champion; The Ring/TBRB; No. 2 Ranked Super Middleweight	WBC/WBA; No. 2 Ranked Super Middleweight; TBRB; No. 3 Ranked Super Middleweight; The Ring; No. 4 Ranked Super Middleweight; IBO; Super Middleweight Champion

Result
- Groves defeated Eubank Jr by Unanimous Decision

George Groves vs Chris Eubank Jr was a professional boxing match contested on 17 February 2018, for the WBA Super Middleweight championship.

== Background ==
After winning their respective quarter final bouts in October 2017, George Groves and Chris Eubank Jr were matched against each other in the semi-final of the World Boxing Super Series. Promoter Kalle Sauerland stated he would try to book the fight for a stadium in either London or Manchester and in November 2017, ITV reported the fight was set to take place on 17 February 2018 at the Manchester Arena in Manchester, then Europe’s largest purpose-built indoor arena. Tickets for the fight sold out in seven minutes. This would be Groves' first fight at the Manchester Arena since his first fight with Carl Froch in November 2013.

Groves weighed 167 pounds, a full pound under the weight limit and Eubank came in at 167.5 pounds. Both boxers were set to earn a base purse of £1.5 million, which could increase thanks to sponsorship and PPV sales.

Eubank Jr was an 8/13 favourite to win.

== The fight ==
Groves, the bigger man in the ring, used his jab to control the fight after a cagey round and mostly fought on the back foot, occasionally landing the big shot. An accidental clash of heads caused a cut on the side of Eubank's right eye in round 3. The big cut was dealt with by his corner after the round, but as the fight went on to the later rounds, blood was seen flowing expeditiously. Many thought Eubank's cutman was inadequate in his attempt to stop the cut, Eubank later said he struggled to see out the eye. The fight was riddled with a lot of clinches and unclean punches from both boxers. Groves suffered a dislocated shoulder in round 12. Nevertheless at the end of the 12th round, all three judges scored the fight for Groves with scores of 117-112, 116-112 and 115-113.

== Aftermath ==
After the fight, Groves said, “It was about who wanted it most, I think, and I obviously wanted it most. The jab was landing correctly all night. When he had success, it was because I did something wrong. He was strong, he was aggressive, but that obviously wasn’t enough tonight.” Eubank replied, “I thought it was close. I thought I did enough in the later rounds to win the fight, but it was a close fight. And all credit to George. You know, this is all part of boxing. You win some and you lose some. Hopefully we can get a rematch. It was enough of a good fight to have another one.” Punch stats showed that Groves landed 117 of 398 punches thrown (29%) and Eubank landed 92 of his 421 thrown (22%).

Four days after the fight it was revealed Groves didn't fight for Eubank Jr's IBO title after failing to agree on sanctioning fees with the IBO's president Ed Levine, thus it became vacant.

== Undercard ==
Confirmed bouts:

== Broadcasting ==
Country	Broadcaster
Baltic & Nordic countries	Viasat
Belgium	VOO
Bulgaria	Nova
Canada	Super Channel
Germany	SAT.1
Russia	Match! Boets
Singapore	StarHub
Sub-Saharan Africa	TVMS
Turkey	Tivibu Sports
United Kingdom	ITV
United States	Audience
Ukraine	Inter

Preceded by vs Jamie Cox	George Groves's bouts 17 February 2018	Succeeded by vs Callum Smith
Preceded by vs Avni Yildirim	Chris Eubank Jr's bouts 17 February 2018	Succeeded by vs J.J. McDonagh
