= Matchroom Sport =

Sporting event promotions company

- Type: Private
- Industry: Sports promotion
- Founded: 1982; 44 years ago in Brentwood, Essex, England
- Headquarters: Brentwood, Essex
- Key people: Barry Hearn (Founder and father); Eddie Hearn (Son)
- Divisions: Matchroom Talent Agency
- Website: www.matchroom.com

Matchroom Sport is a British multinational sports promotions company founded by Barry Hearn. Founded in 1982, the company was initially involved in snooker and boxing, but as of 2026, Matchroom runs events and competitions across multiple sports including pool, bowling, golf, fishing, darts, table tennis, poker and gymnastics. The company is based in Brentwood, Essex. Matchroom has had broadcasting agreements in the United Kingdom with DAZN, Sky Sports, ITV, and the BBC.

== History ==
Matchroom formed in 1982 concentrating on snooker management with the likes of Steve Davis, Dennis Taylor, and Jimmy White under contract and including Terry Griffiths, Willie Thorne, Tony Meo and Neal Foulds. It sponsored two non-ranking tournaments, the Matchroom Professional Championship (1986–1988, restricted to its contracted players) and Matchroom League (1987–1994). A novelty song called "Snooker Loopy" by "Chas & Dave and The Matchroom Mob" reached number 6 in the UK Singles Chart in 1986, with five Matchroom players featured on backup vocals and in the video; Meo, Griffiths, Taylor, Thorne and Davis.

Hearn's first foray into boxing promotion was the Frank Bruno vs. Joe Bugner heavyweight clash in 1987 in front of 35,000 people at White Hart Lane.

The range of sports increased in 1994 with the Mosconi Cup, an event which sees teams from Europe and the United States compete in a 9-ball pool tournament. It has become a major event on the professional pool calendar.

Over the years, Matchroom's portfolio under Hearn grew, taking a majority stake in the Professional Darts Corporation in 2001, helping oversee a growth in the sport. Matchroom Sport also promote the World Cup of Pool, a national team scotch doubles event, and the World Pool Masters, an annual nine-ball event.

In 2002, the company formed PGA EuroPro Tour, the UK's leading developmental golf tour, in association with the PGA. Later, in the 2000s, came ten pin bowling's Weber Cup. In 2009, Barry Hearn became the majority shareholder in World Snooker Tour Ltd. Since then the sport has grown, with prize money increased and new events introduced worldwide.

More recently, Matchroom has launched the World Championship of Ping Pong, Superstars of Gymnastics, British Basketball All-Stars, and British Fast5 Netball All-Stars Championship.

In May 2018, Matchroom Boxing agreed five-year deal with DAZN reportedly worth £740 million to promote 16 fights in the US on the channel. In June 2021, both firms extended its agreement.

In April 2021, Barry Hearn stepped down as chairman with his son Eddie taking over the role. Barry will continue as president in an advisory role, while Eddie takes over as head of the PGA EuroPro tour, alongside overseeing Matchroom's wider operations and continuing to head the boxing division.

In February 2026, Matchroom Boxing signed a new five-year deal with DAZN in the United States and the United Kingdom, extending their partnership through 2031, and also partnered with Foxtel in Australia to stream its events on Kayo Sports. As part of the deal. DAZN will broadcast 30 Matchroom events a year.

In May 2026, Matchroom announced the sale of minority equity stake of 15% to Bruin Capital, an American private equity firm, in a transaction that valued the company at more than £1 billion. As part of the deal, the Hearn family will retain control of the company with Bruin joining the board to advise on the company's growth in North America.

== Boxing ==
As of 2023, boxing accounted for $235 million of Matchroom's annual sales revenue. A rising list of signed boxing stars and steady events aided its gaining popularity and viewership growth, with Hearn citing the streaming model with DAZN as a major success factor for the brand.

In 2024, Hearn expressed an interest in exploring a 9pm main event start time for Matchroom fights.

In February 2025, Hearn announced a partnership between Matchroom and event management vendor Victory Live to provide enhanced ticketing distribution and fan experiences.

=== Current stable ===
Boxer	Nationality	Weight	Record	World Titles
Murodjon Akhmadaliev	(Uzbekistan) Uzbek	Super-bantamweight	14-2 (11 KOs)	
Dave Allen	(England) English	Heavyweight	24-8-2 (19 KOs)	
Leo Atang	(England) English	Heavyweight	3-0 (3 KOs)	
Tiah-Mai Ayton	(England) English	Bantamweight	4-0 (4 KOs)	
Zelfa Barrett	(England) English	Super-featherweight	34-3 (18 KOs)	
Alexis Barriere	(Canada) Canadian	Heavyweight	12-1 (10 KOs)	
Reece Bellotti	(England) English	Super-featherweight	20-7 (15 KOs)	
Taylor Bevan	(Wales) Welsh	Super-middleweight	7-0 (7 KOs)	
Dmitry Bivol	(Russia) Russian	Light-heavyweight	24-1 (12 KOs)	WBA, IBF, WBO, and The Ring Light-heavyweight World champion
Junaid Bostan	(England) English	Super-welterweight	10-1-1 (8 KOs)	
Aaron Bowen	(England) English	Middleweight	7-1 (5 KOs)	
Pat Brown	(England) English	Cruiserweight	5-0 (5 KOs)	
Leli Buttigieg	(England) English	Middleweight	11-0 (3 KO)	
Marc Castro	(United States) American	Lightweight	13-1 (8 KOs)	
Jack Catterall	(England) English	Super-lightweight	32-2 (14 KOs)	
Cheavon Clarke	(England) English	Cruiserweight	11-2 (8 KOs)	
Khalil Coe	(United States) American	Light-heavyweight	10-1-1 (8 KOs)	
Kieron Conway	(England) English	Middleweight	23-4-1 (7 KOs)	
Joe Cordina	(Wales) Welsh	Super-featherweight	19-1 (9 KOs)	
Maisey Rose Courtney	(England) English	Flyweight	9-1 (0 KOs)	
Lewis Crocker	(Northern Ireland) Northern Irish	Welterweight	22-0 (11 KOs)	IBF Welterweight World champion
William Crolla	(England) English	Super-welterweight	9-1 (7 KOs)	
Andy Cruz	(Cuba) Cuban	Lightweight	6-0 (3 KOs)	
Gary Cully	(Republic of Ireland) Irish	Lightweight	18-2 (10 KOs)	
Ishmael Davis	(England) English	Super-welterweight	15-3 (6 KOs)	
Nishant Dev	(India) Indian	Super-welterweight	5-0 (3 KOs)	
Mark Dickinson	(England) English	Super-middleweight	8-2 (2 KOs)	
Rhiannon Dixon	(England) English	Lightweight	10-1 (1 KO)	
Paddy Donovan	(Republic of Ireland) Irish	Welterweight	14-2 (11 KOs)	
Jaron Ennis	(United States) American	Super-welterweight	35-0 (31 KOs)	
Beatriz Ferreira	(Brazil) Brazilian	Lightweight	8-1 (2 KOs)	
Aqib Fiaz	(England) English	Super-featherweight	14-1 (2 KOs)	
Johnny Fisher	(England) English	Heavyweight	14-1 (12 KOs)	
Raymond Ford	(United States) American	Super-featherweight	18-1-1 (8 KOs)	
Shakhram Giyasov	(Uzbekistan) Uzbek	Welterweight	17-0 (10 KOs)	
Jalil Hackett	(United States) American	Welterweight	11-1 (9 KOs)	
John Hedges	(England) English	Cruiserweight	12-0 (3 KOs)	
Eduardo Hernandez	(Mexico) Mexican	Super-featherweight	37-2 (32 KOs)	
Richardson Hitchins	(United States) American	Super-lightweight	20-0 (8 KOs)	IBF Super-lightweight World champion
Justis Huni	(Australia) Australian	Heavyweight	12-1 (7 KOs)	
Omari Jones	(United States) American	Super-welterweight	4-0 (4 KOs)	
Anthony Joshua	(England) English	Heavyweight	29-4 (26 KOs)	
George Kambosos Jr	(Australia) Australian	Super-lightweight	22-4 (10 KOs)	
Josh Kelly	(England) English	Super-welterweight	17-1-1 (9 KOs)	
George Liddard	(England) English	Middleweight	13-0 (8 KOs)	
Adam Maca	(Albania) Albanian	Super-bantamweight	4-0 (4 KOs)	
Israil Madrimov	(Uzbekistan) Uzbek	Super-welterweight	10-2-1 (7 KOs)	
Shabaz Masoud	(England) English	Super-bantamweight	15-0 (4 KOs)	
Molly McCann	(England) English	Super-bantamweight	4-0 (1 KO)	
Pat McCormack	(England) English	Welterweight	8-1 (6 KOs)	
Joe McGrail	(England) English	Featherweight	12-0 (5 KOs)	
Peter McGrail	(England) English	Featherweight	12-2 (6 KOs)	
Harley Mederos	(United States) American	Lightweight	9-0 (8 KOs)	
Christian Medina	(Mexico) Mexican	Bantamweight	26-4 (19 KOs)	WBO Bantamweight World champion
Ernesto Mercado	(United States) American	Super-lightweight	18-0 (17 KOs)	
Vito Mielnicki Jr.	(United States) American	Middleweight	23-1(1) (13 KOs)	
Connor Mitchell	(England) English	Featherweight	1-0 (1 KO)	
Zaquin Moses	(United States) American	Super-featherweight	5-0 (3 KOs)	
Skye Nicolson	(Australia) Australian	Super-bantamweight	15-1 (3 KOs)	
Eduardo Nunez	(Mexico) Mexican	Super-featherweight	29-1 (27 KOs)	IBF Super-featherweight World champion
Elif Nur Turhan	(Turkey) Turkish	Lightweight	12-0 (8 KOs)	WBC female Lightweight World champion
Jai Opetaia	(Australia) Australian	Cruiserweight	29-0 (23 KOs)	IBF, and The Ring Cruiserweight World champion
William Ortiz	(Puerto Rico) Puerto Rican	Super-lightweight	9-0 (5 KOs)	
Diego Pacheco	(United States) American	Super-middleweight	25-0 (18 KOs)	
Josh Padley	(England) English	Lightweight	17-1 (5 KOs)	
Lenier Pero	(Cuba) Cuban	Heavyweight	13-0 (8 KOs)	
Stephanie Pineiro	(Puerto Rico) Puerto Rican	Welterweight	10-0 (3 KOs)	
Hopey Price	(England) English	Featherweight	12-0 (5 KOs)	
Craig Richards	(England) English	Light-heavyweight	20-4-1 (13 KOs)	
Jesse Rodriguez	(United States) American	Super-flyweight	23-0 (16 KOs)	WBA, WBC, WBO and The Ring Super-flyweight World champion
Leonardo Rubalcava	(United States) American	Super-lightweight	9-1-1 (3 KOs)	
Sandy Ryan	(England) English	Welterweight	8-3-1 (3 KOs)	
Shannon Ryan	(England) English	Super-flyweight	10-1 (1 KO)	
Jimmy Sains	(England) English	Middleweight	11-0 (10 KOs)	
Brandon Scott	(England) English	Featherweight	8-0 (1 KO)	
Callum Smith	(England) English	Light-heavyweight	31-2 (22 KOs)	
Dalton Smith	(England) English	Super-lightweight	19-0 (14 KOs)	WBC Super-lightweight World champion
Liam Smith	(England) English	Middleweight	33-5-1 (20 KOs)	
Shakur Stevenson	(United States) American	Lightweight	24-0 (11 KOs)	WBC Lightweight World champion
Ibraheem Sulaimaan	(England) English	Super-featherweight	10-0 (5 KOs)	
Katie Taylor	(Republic of Ireland) Irish	Super-lightweight	25-1 (6 KOs)	WBA, WBC, IBF, WBO, and The Ring female Super-lightweight World champion
Teremoana Teremoana	(Australia) Australian	Heavyweight	9-0 (9 KOs)	
Jordan Thompson	(England) English	Cruiserweight	15-2 (12 KOs)	
Conner Tudsbury	(England) English	Light-heavyweight	3-0 (2 KOs)	
Hamza Uddin	(England) English	Flyweight	6-0 (3 KOs)	
Antonio Vargas	(United States) American	Bantamweight	19-1-1 (11 KOs)	WBA Bantamweight World champion in Recess
Giorgio Visioli	(England) English	Super-featherweight	10-0 (6 KOs)	
Cameron Vuong	(England) English	Lightweight	9-0-1 (4 KOs)	
Conah Walker	(England) English	Welterweight	17-3-1 (8 KOs)	
Conor Wallace	(Republic of Ireland) Irish	Light-heavyweight	16-1 (11 KOs)	
Josh Warrington	(England) English	Super-featherweight	32-4-1 (8 KOs)	
Ben Whittaker	(England) English	Light-heavyweight	10-0-1 (7 KOs)	
Austin Williams	(United States) American	Middleweight	19-1 (13 KOs)	
Galal Yafai	(England) English	Flyweight	9-1 (7 KOs)	

== Matchroom Talent Agency ==
Hearn formed Matchroom Talent Agency in March 2026. Sport clients signed in 2026 included mixed martial artist Tom Aspinall, rugby union players Henry Pollock and Finn Russell, and sprinter Bronson Hearn-Smith.
