= Azteca Deportes =

Sports division of TV Azteca

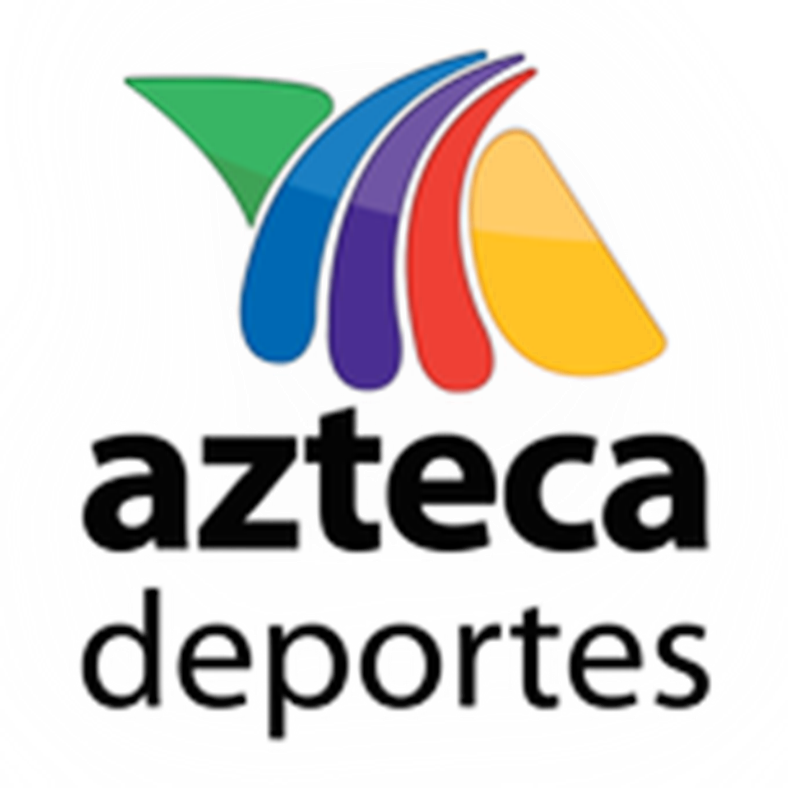
Azteca Deportes logo

Azteca Deportes (currently known as TV Azteca Deportes) is the sports division of Mexico's TV Azteca television network. It produces sports events and regular sports programming aired on the Azteca Uno and Azteca 7 networks in Mexico and now on Estrella TV in the United States.

== History ==
Azteca's predecessor, Imevisión, had carried some sports programming, notably including the 1988 and 1992 Summer Olympics and the 1992 Winter Olympics, as well as the 1986 and 1990 FIFA World Cups. Azteca increased its sports programming upon privatization in 1993.

== Current programs ==
=== Liga MX ===
TV Azteca owns Mazatlán F.C., and carries the home matches of this teams as well as Club Puebla, Atlas F.C., FC Juárez, Club Necaxa, Querétaro F.C. and C.D. Guadalajara. In some cases, the rights are shared with ESPN and Televisa.

=== International soccer ===
TV Azteca also holds part or all of the Mexican rights to the FIFA Confederations Cup, Copa América, CONCACAF Gold Cup, and the FIFA World Cup.

In addition, Azteca and competitor Televisa share the rights to the games of the Mexico national football team through 2018.

In 2024, Azteca covering the American NWSL matches.

=== American football ===
Azteca 7 has carried NFL games for years. During the regular season, it airs a whip-around program similar to NFL RedZone called Ritual NFL, which covers the early afternoon games. It also airs the Super Bowl and AFC playoff games.

=== Boxing and lucha libre ===
Box Azteca, featuring major fights, airs regularly on Azteca 7. Lucha Azteca debuted in 2016, featuring the Liga Élite promotion and revived in 2019 with a new deal with Lucha Libre AAA Worldwide.

=== Studio shows ===
The primary studio show produced by Azteca Deportes is the weekly show DeporTV, which airs on Sundays and predates TV Azteca itself by nearly 20 years. Other studio shows, such as Los Protagonistas, have also aired over the years on Azteca 13 and Azteca 7.

== Former sports programs ==
Sports that Azteca has carried in the past but to which it does not currently hold the rights include NBA basketball, NHL hockey and the Olympic Games (whose rights in 2016 were held by América Móvil and subleased to public broadcasters).

== Notable personalities ==
=== Play-by-play ===
- Christian Martinoli
- Antonio Rosique
- Carlos Guerrero
- Jesús Joel Fuentes
- Enrique Garay
- César Castro
- Rodolfo Vargas
- Rafael Ayala
- Iris Cisneros

=== Analysts ===
- Luis García Postigo
- Luis Roberto Alves
- Jorge Campos
- David Medrano
- Francisco Chacón
- Joaquín Castillo
- Julio César Chávez
- Eduardo Lamazón
- Gerardo Velazquez de León

=== Anchors ===
- Inés Sainz
- Alfredo Domínguez Muro
- Hugo Enrique Kiese

=== Reporters ===
- Álvaro López Sordo
- Omar Villarreal
- Juan Carlos Báez
- Tania Ventimilla
- Jorge Pinto
- Ashley González
- Pablo de Rubens
