= VOO =

Commercial name of the Belgian cable company

- Industry: Telecommunications
- Founded: April 2006; 19 years ago
- Services: Broadcast television; Cable television; Broadband Internet; Telephone; Mobile phone
- Owner: Orange Belgium
- Website: http://www.voo.be/en/

VOO (/vuː/) is the commercial name of the Belgian cable company created by the Economic Interest Group (EIG) of Brutélé GIE in (Brussels Region and Charleroi Region) and Association Liégeoise d'Electricité (A.L.E.- Télédis), but came to be controlled by Nethys SA and Brutélé SCRL until 2023.

Then two companies together bought eight Walloon cable companies (Igeho, Inatel, Intermosane, Seditel, Simogel, Telelux, Interest-Interost et Ideatel), and the EIG constitutes today the primary cable operator in Wallonia and a part in the Brussels Region. It offers mobile telephony using the Telenet network.

In November 2021, Orange Belgium is now chosen to take over the company, winning against Telenet. A board meeting of Enodia was held on 14 December to validate or reject the decision of the board of Nethys. Thereafter, it will take several months for Orange Belgium to obtain the approval of the Competition Council and the European Commission, which must announce its decision by 6 December 2022.

On 5 June 2023, the Belgian unit of the French company completed the acquisition of the controlling stake in VOO.
