= Richard Riakporhe =

English boxer (born 1990)

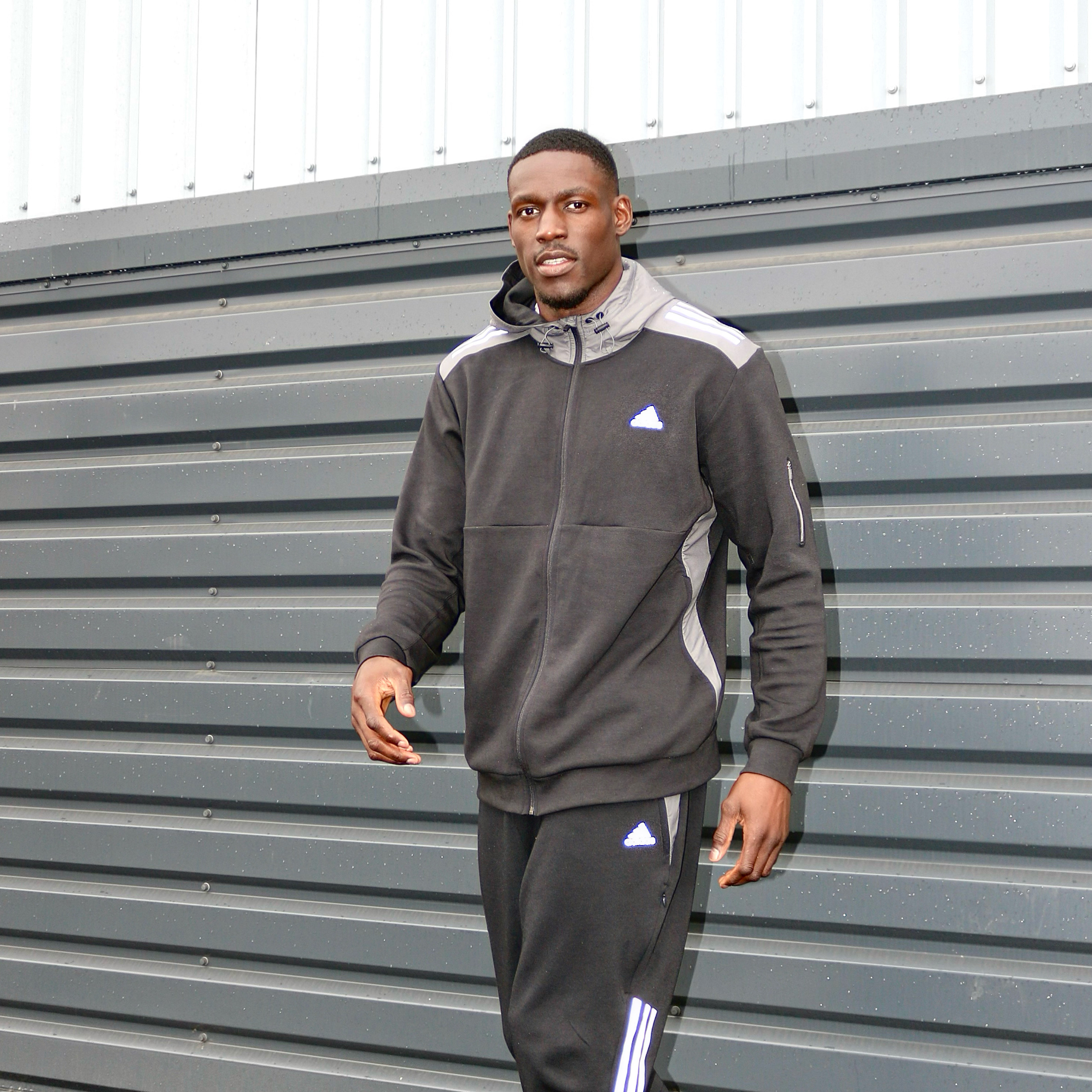

Personal information
- Nickname: The Midnight Train
- Born: 5 January 1990 (age 36) London, England
- Height: 6 ft 5 in (196 cm)
- Weight: Heavyweight, Cruiserweight

Boxing career
- Reach: 77 in (196 cm)
- Stance: Orthodox

Boxing record
- Total fights: 21
- Wins: 20
- Win by KO: 16
- Losses: 1

Richard Riakporhe (born 5 January 1990) is an English professional boxer. He is a two-weight British champion having held the heavyweight title since April 2026 and previously the cruiserweight title from 2019 to 2020.

== Early life ==
Born on 5 January 1990 to Nigerian parents, Richard Riakporhe grew up on the Aylesbury Estate in Walworth, London. At the age of 15, he was stabbed in the chest outside a house party, requiring emergency surgery to drain his lungs of blood. Riakporhe had a late start to boxing; first stepping into a gym, the Lynn ABC, at the age of 19. Alongside boxing as an amateur he continued in pursuit of further education, studying at college and eventually moving on to Kingston University in south west London, earning a degree in marketing communications and advertising in 2015.

== Professional career ==
Riakporhe made his professional debut on 6 August 2016, scoring a four-round points decision (PTS) victory over Jason Jones at the York Hall in London. Following a second win in 2016 – a technical knockout (TKO) over Aaron Lacy in October – he scored three consecutive TKO victories in 2017; against Istvan Orsos in February; Milan Cechvala in May; and Jiri Svacina in October.

He began 2018 with a TKO victory over Adam Williams in March, followed by a win via corner retirement (RTD) against Elvis Dube in July. Riakporhe's final fight of 2018 was against Sam Hyde on 10 November at the Manchester Arena, with the vacant WBA Inter-Continental cruiserweight title on the line. Riakporhe won via eighth-round TKO after Hyde's trainer, Joe Gallagher, threw in the towel after Hyde sustained an eye injury from a right hook. Riakporhe was behind on all three judges' scorecards at the time of the stoppage, with two judges scoring the bout 68–65 while the third scored it 67–66. The fight was televised live on Sky Sports Box Office in the United Kingdom and streamed through DAZN in the United States as part of the undercard of Oleksandr Usyk vs. Tony Bellew.

The first defence of his WBA title came on 2 March 2019 against Tommy McCarthy at the East of England Arena in Peterborough. Riakporhe dropped his opponent twice en route to a fourth-round TKO. He defended the title for a second time against Chris Billam-Smith on 20 July at The O2 Arena, London. Riakporhe won by split decision (SD), with two judges scoring the bout in favour of Riakporhe at 97–92 and 95–94, while the third scored it to Smith at 96–93. The fight was televised live on Sky Sports Box Office in the United Kingdom and streamed through DAZN in the United States as part of the undercard for Dillian Whyte vs. Óscar Rivas. Riakporhe was scheduled to face Jack Massey on 19 December 2019 for the vacant British cruiserweight title. He won the fight by unanimous decision, with scores of 115–113, 115–113 and 117–111.

Riakporhe returned from a near two-year layoff to face Krzysztof Twardowski on 2 October 2021 in his first non-title bout since 28 July 2018. He won the fight by unanimous decision, with all three judges scoring the fight 79–72. A month later, Riakporhe beat Olanrewaju Durodola by a fifth-round technical knockout to capture the vacant WBC Silver cruiserweight title.

Riakporhe was booked to face Fabio Turchi on 26 March 2022, in the main event of a BOXXER Fight Night card which was scheduled to take place at the Wembley Arena in London, England. Turchi withdrew from the bout on 9 March, due to injuries sustained in training, and was replaced by Deion Jumah. Riakporhe won the fight by knockout, flooring Jumah with a straight right to the body early in the eighth round. Riakporhe faced Turchi on the 11 June 2022, once again as the main event of a BOXXER card. Riakporhe extended his unbeaten record again in an IBF world title eliminator, flooring Turchi in the second round with a body shot. Turchi rose to his feet after the eight count, but with Turchi being visibly hurt, his corner threw in the towel. Referee Steve Gray stopped the fight 1:53 into the round.

Riakporhe faced the former two-time WBO cruiserweight world champion Krzysztof Głowacki on 21 January 2023 (on the undercard of Chris Eubank Jr. vs. Liam Smith). He won the fight by a fourth-round technical knockout.

On 15 June 2023, the IBF cruiserweight champion Jai Opetaia was ordered to make a mandatory title defense against Riakporhe. He entered into negotiations with Opetaia in lieu of Mateusz Masternak, who withdrew from a scheduled purse bid with the Australian the day before. Riakporhe withdrew from the negotiations on August 8, 2023, shortly before a scheduled purse bid hearing.

Riakporhe challenged WBO cruiserweight champion Chris Billam-Smith at Selhurst Park in London, England, on 15 June 2024, but lost by unanimous decision. The ringside judges scored the contest 116–111, 115–112, 115–112.

On his debut at heavyweight, Riakporhe beat Kevin Nicolas Espindola at Anb Arena, Riyadh, Saudi Arabia, when his opponent retired at the end of round four.

He beat Tommy Welch by technical knockout in the second round at Tottenham Hotspur Stadium in London on 15 November 2025.

On 11 April 2026, Riakporhe challenged Jeamie Tshikeva for the British heavyweight title at Tottenham Hotspur Stadium in London. He won by fifth round technical knockout to become a two-weight British champion.

== Outside of boxing ==
Drawing from his experiences of a troubled upbringing, Riakporhe set up a company, Richard Riakporhe Foundation, which focuses on talking to schoolchildren on positive thinking and the dangers of knife crime. Riakporhe is a supporter of Crystal Palace.

He is also a professional fashion model, having worked for brands such as Burberry.

== Professional boxing record ==
21 fights	20 wins	1 loss
By knockout	16	0
By decision	4	1

No.	Result	Record	Opponent	Type	Round, time	Date	Location	Notes
21	Win	20–1	Jeamie Tshikeva	TKO	5 (12), 2:12	11 Apr 2026	Tottenham Hotspur Stadium, London, England	Won British heavyweight title
20	Win	19–1	Tommy Welch	TKO	2 (10), 2:48	15 Nov 2025	Tottenham Hotspur Stadium, London, England	
19	Win	18–1	Kevin Nicolas Espindola	RTD	4 (8), 3:00	3 May 2025	Anb Arena, Riyadh, Saudi Arabia	
18	Loss	17–1	Chris Billam-Smith	UD	12	15 Jun 2024	Selhurst Park, London, England	For WBO cruiserweight title
17	Win	17–0	Dylan Bregeon	TKO	2 (8), 1:36	18 Nov 2023	The Halls, Wolverhampton, England	
16	Win	16–0	Krzysztof Głowacki	TKO	4 (12), 2:43	21 Jan 2023	Manchester Arena, Manchester, England	
15	Win	15–0	Fabio Turchi	TKO	2 (12), 1:53	11 Jun 2022	The SSE Arena Wembley, London, England	
14	Win	14–0	Deion Jumah	KO	8 (12), 0:35	26 Mar 2022	The SSE Arena Wembley, London, England	
13	Win	13–0	Olanrewaju Durodola	TKO	5 (10), 0:36	20 Nov 2021	The SSE Arena Wembley, London, England	Won vacant WBC Silver cruiserweight title
12	Win	12–0	Krzysztof Twardowski	UD	8	2 Oct 2021	The SSE Arena Wembley, London, England	
11	Win	11–0	Jack Massey	UD	12	19 Dec 2019	York Hall, London, England	Won vacant British cruiserweight title
10	Win	10–0	Chris Billam-Smith	SD	10	20 Jul 2019	The O2 Arena, London, England	Retained WBA Inter-Continental cruiserweight title
9	Win	9–0	Tommy McCarthy	TKO	4 (10), 2:45	2 Mar 2019	East of England Arena, Peterborough, England	Retained WBA Inter-Continental cruiserweight title
8	Win	8–0	Sam Hyde	TKO	8 (10), 2:41	10 Nov 2018	Manchester Arena, Manchester, England	Won vacant WBA Inter-Continental cruiserweight title
7	Win	7–0	Elvis Dube	RTD	2 (4), 3:00	28 Jul 2018	The O2 Arena, London, England	
6	Win	6–0	Adam Williams	TKO	3 (4), 2:38	24 Mar 2018	The O2 Arena, London, England	
5	Win	5–0	Jiri Svacina	TKO	2 (6), 0:46	14 Oct 2017	York Hall, London, England	
4	Win	4–0	Milan Cechvala	TKO	1 (4), 2:15	27 May 2017	York Hall, London, England	
3	Win	3–0	Istvan Orsos	TKO	1 (4), 2:54	18 Feb 2017	York Hall, London, England	
2	Win	2–0	Aaron Lacy	TKO	1 (4), 2:14	1 Oct 2016	York Hall, London, England	
1	Win	1–0	Jason Jones	PTS	4	6 Aug 2016	York Hall, London, England	

Sporting positions
Regional boxing titles
Vacant Title last held by Ryad Merhy	WBA Inter-Continental cruiserweight champion 10 November 2018 – present	Incumbent
Vacant Title last held by Lawrence Okolie	British cruiserweight champion 19 December 2019 – September 2020; Vacated	Vacant
