= Anthony Joshua vs. Kubrat Pulev =

2020 professional boxing match

Anthony Joshua vs Kubrat Pulev
- Date: 12 December 2020
- Venue: Wembley Arena, London, England
- Title(s) on the line: WBA (Super), IBF, WBO, and IBO heavyweight titles

Tale of the tape
Boxer	Anthony Joshua	Kubrat Pulev
Nickname	AJ	The Cobra
Hometown	London, England	Sofia, Bulgaria
Pre-fight record	23–1 (21 KO)	28–1 (14 KO)
Age	31 years, 1 month	39 years, 7 months
Height	6 ft 6 in (198 cm)	6 ft 4 1/2 in (194 cm)
Weight	241 lb (109 kg)	240 lb (109 kg)
Style	Orthodox	Orthodox
Recognition	WBA (Super), IBF, WBO and IBO; Heavyweight Champion; The Ring; No. 1 Ranked Heavyweight	IBF; No. 1 Ranked Heavyweight; WBO; No. 4 Ranked Heavyweight; WBA; No. 11 Ranked Heavyweight; The Ring; No. 10 Ranked Heavyweight

Result
- Joshua wins via ninth-round knockout

Anthony Joshua vs Kubrat Pulev, was a heavyweight professional boxing match contested between defending unified WBA (Super), IBF, WBO, and IBO world champion Anthony Joshua and IBF mandatory challenger Kubrat Pulev. The event took place on 12 December 2020 at Wembley Arena in London. Joshua retained his titles via ninth-round knockout.

== Background ==
=== 2017 Cancelled world title fight ===
On 28 August 2017, it was announced that Joshua and Pulev would fight at the Millennium Stadium in Cardiff. Matchroom promoter Eddie Hearn made the official announcement on 5 September, "I'm delighted that we will be in Cardiff at the magnificent Millennium Stadium for the next step of the AJ journey. Nearly 80,000 will gather on 28 October 2017 to create another unforgettable night of boxing. Anthony will meet his mandatory challenger, [IBF] No. 1-ranked Kubrat Pulev, and the card will be stacked with world championship action, domestic title fights and the very best young stars in the game. Get ready for the next episode from the biggest star in world boxing." The official press conference took place on 11 September 2017 and the following day, a reported 70,000 tickets had been sold, making it the fastest selling event. It also set the record of largest boxing attendance to be expected indoors. The previous record was Muhammad Ali vs. Leon Spinks rematch which gathered 63,000 fans at the New Orleans Superdrome in 1978. On 16 October 2017, rumours circulated that Pulev had suffered an injury, which could see the fight being in jeopardy. The same reports suggested the injury was 10 days old, but Pulev's camp had kept it quiet. The injury was later revealed to be true and 36-year-old Carlos Takam (35–3–1, 27 KOs), who was ranked number 3 by the IBF stepped in to replace Pulev on 12 days notice. Eddie Hearn said in a statement that he received a phone call from Pulev's promoter Kalle Sauerland, advising him of a shoulder injury he sustained during sparring. Hearn revealed when the Joshua vs Pulev fight was made, he reached out to Takam's camp, knowing they would be next in line and told them to begin a training camp and stay on standby.

=== 2020 ===
On 2 March 2020, both Matchroom's Eddie Hearn and Top Rank's Bob Arum officially announced Joshua and Pulev would fight at the Tottenham Hotspur Stadium in London on 20 June. On 3 April 2020, it was announced that the fight had been postponed due to the COVID-19 pandemic and that a new date for the fight "was being worked on". Up to 1,000 people were allowed to attend the fight.

Pulev's only prior defeat had come in a title shot against Wladimir Klitschko in November 2014, being the last man ever to be stopped by him.

== The fight ==
Both fighters began cautiously in the first round, attempting to find each other's range. However, Joshua came out aggressively in the third round and forced Pulev into taking a standing count as he had turned his back on the Briton. When the fight resumed Joshua looked for the knockout and knocked Pulev down with an uppercut late in the round. Pulev beat the count and was able to hold off the champion until the bell. Despite the two knockdowns, Pulev recovered well enough to win the fourth round on some scorecards. The fight continued until the ninth round, where Joshua knocked the Bulgarian down for a third time with a "barrage of uppercuts". Pulev was once again able to continue fighting, however he was immediately hit with a right hand that knocked him out, giving Joshua the victory via ninth-round knockout.

== Aftermath ==
Following the fight, attention immediately turned to a potential unification bout with WBC and The Ring title holder Tyson Fury. Fury quickly posted a video on social media claiming that he would knock out Joshua "inside three rounds". Joshua responded positively, stating "that's good to hear" and "at least I can get him in the ring". Eddie Hearn, Joshua's promoter, also commented on a potential fight between the two, saying that he "can’t see any obstacles" to the fight and that he expected it to be agreed in a matter of days.

== Fight card ==
Weight Class		vs.		Method	Round	Time	Notes
Heavyweight	(United Kingdom) Anthony Joshua (c)	def.	(Bulgaria) Kubrat Pulev	KO	9/12	2:58	^{Note 1}
Junior-heavyweight	(United Kingdom) Lawrence Okolie	def.	(Poland) Nikodem Jeżewski	TKO	2/12	1:45	^{Note 2}
Heavyweight	(United Kingdom) Hughie Fury	def.	(Poland) Mariusz Wach	UD	10
Heavyweight	(Democratic Republic of the Congo) Martin Bakole	def.	(Russia) Sergey Kuzmin	UD	10		^{Note 3}
Light-middleweight	(United Kingdom) Kieron Conway	def.	(United Kingdom) Macaulay McGowan	UD	10
Welterweight	(Albania) Florian Marku	vs.	(United Kingdom) Jamie Stewart	Draw	8
Super-bantamweight	(United Kingdom) Qais Ashfaq	def.	(United Kingdom) Ashley Lane	TKO	4/8	0:20

^Note 1 For unified WBA (Super), IBF, WBO, and IBO heavyweight titles
^Note 2 For vacant WBO International junior-heavyweight title
^Note 3 For vacant WBC International heavyweight title

== Broadcasters ==
The fight was televised live in the United Kingdom and Ireland on pay-per-view channel Sky Sports Box Office. Subscription streaming service DAZN also broadcast the fight worldwide (including in Bulgaria) as the part of DAZN's grand launch.

Preceded by vs. Andy Ruiz Jr.	Anthony Joshua's bouts 12 December 2020	Succeeded by vs. Oleksandr Usyk
Preceded by vs. Rydell Booker	Kubrat Pulev's bouts 12 December 2020	Succeeded by vs. Jerry Forrest
