= Oleksandr Usyk vs. Tony Bellew =

Boxing match

He Who Dares
- Date: 10 November 2018
- Venue: Manchester Arena, Manchester, UK
- Title(s) on the line: WBA, WBC, IBF, WBO, The Ring and TBRB undisputed cruiserweight championship

Tale of the tape
Boxer	(Ukraine) Oleksandr Usyk	(United Kingdom) Tony Bellew
Nickname	"The Cat"	"Bomber"
Hometown	Simferopol, Crimea, Ukraine	Liverpool, Merseyside, UK
Purse	£800,000	£4,000,000
Pre-fight record	15–0 (11 KO)	30–2–1 (20 KO)
Age	31 years, 9 months	35 years, 11 months
Height	6 ft 3 in (191 cm)	6 ft 3 in (191 cm)
Weight	198 1/4 lb (90 kg)	199 1/4 lb (90 kg)
Style	Southpaw	Orthodox
Recognition	WBA, WBC, IBF, WBO, The Ring and TBRB undisputed Cruiserweight Champion; The Ring No. 5 ranked pound-for-pound fighter	WBA; No. 8 Ranked Cruiserweight

Result
- Usyk defeated Bellew via 8th round TKO

Oleksandr Usyk vs. Tony Bellew, billed as He Who Dares was a professional boxing match contested on 10 November 2018, for the undisputed cruiserweight championship.

== Background ==
Speaking in the aftermath of his second stoppage victory over former heavyweight champion David Haye, former cruiserweight champion Tony Bellew mentioned Andre Ward who his team had brief negotiations with in 2017, Tyson Fury, Dillian Whyte as well the winner of the upcoming World Boxing Super Series final between Oleksandr Usyk and Murat Gassiev as potential next opponents.

After Usyk defeated Gassiev to win the undisputed cruiserweight championship he called out Bellew, saying "At this time I have heard that Tony Bellew wants to fight the winner of the Muhammad Ali Trophy. I hope he will see me talking.... 'hey Tony Bellew, are you ready?' If he doesn't want to go down [in weight], I will go up [in weight] for him. I will eat more spaghetti for my dinner!" Also after the fight Usyk said: "Olympic [stadium], thanks. People, countrymen and those who supported. Moscow 2018. Bang! Daddy's in the building!". Bellew responded via social media that he would accept the fight, however stated the fight would need to take place in 2018 and for the undisputed championship, believing that a fight at heavyweight would not be as appealing as he would not gain much with a win. Bellew also stated it would be his last fight as a professional.

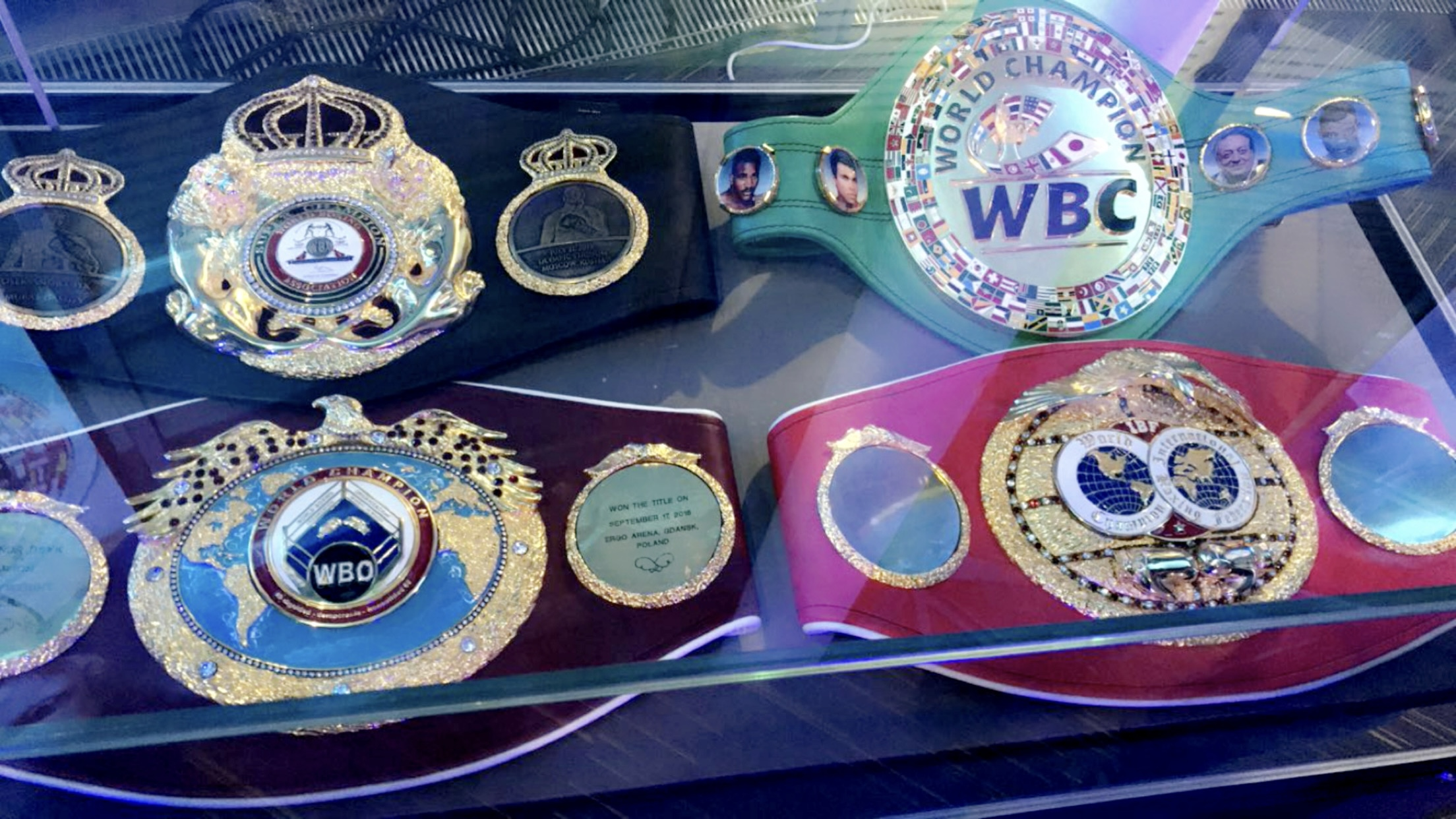
Usyk's Undisputed Cruiserweight Titles

By the end of July, it was said the fight would likely take place in November 2018 in London. After positive meetings between Eddie Hearn and K2's Alexander Krassyuk, on 20 August, Boxing Scene reported the fight was likely to take place on 10 November 2018. A week later, K2 Promotions confirmed the date of the fight. On 5 September, the WBA ordered Usyk to start negotiating with Denis Lebedev, who was their 'champion in recess' and gave them until the first week of October 2018 to complete negotiations. This was said to be a stumbling block for the potential Usyk vs. Bellew fight. According to Hearn, the fight was likely to be pushed back to 2019. Prior to negotiations, Bellew stated the fight must happen in 2018. On 7 September, Usyk signed a multi-fight deal with Matchroom Boxing, which meant he would fight exclusively on Sky Sports in the UK and DAZN in the US.

A week after signing with Matchroom, the Usyk vs. Bellew fight was announced to take place on 10 November at the Manchester Arena. Bellew's guaranteed purse for the fight was £4 million.

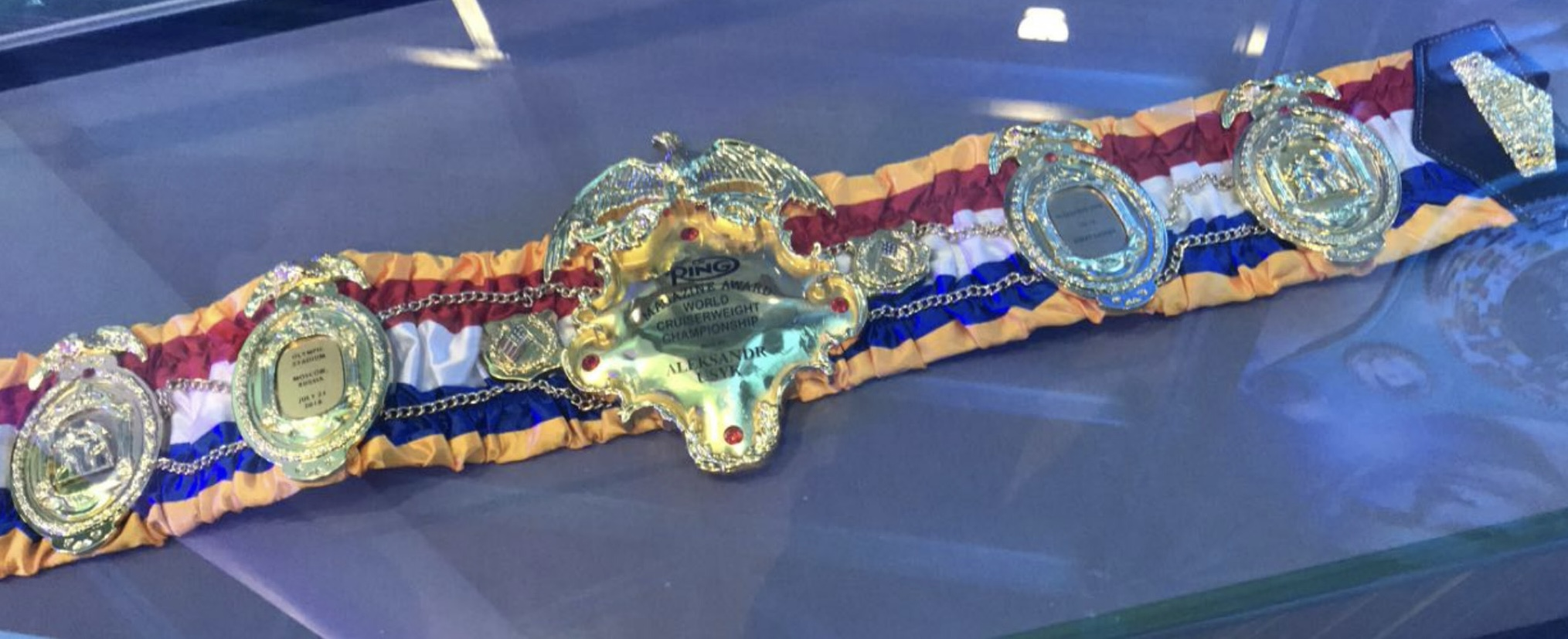
Usyk's Ring Magazine Belt on show at the media workout

Speaking in the build up to the bout Bellew said "I feel fantastic. Fat boy is in shape. Usyk is in the deep end. There will be war. He’s a formidable champion, one of the pound-for-pound kings of the world. We’re going to create madness."

== The fight ==
There was very little action in round one as both boxers showed each other respect. Due to the lack of action, the crowd began to boo towards the end of the round. Round two was similar, however Bellew stepped on the gas and landed some clean shots along with some showboating. Bellew took control in round three, landing two straight right hands. Usyk began using his jab more and after landing an overhand left, Bellew was left slightly shaken. By the end of round four, Bellew was backed up against the ropes and looked to tire. Bellew aimed most of his shots to Usyk's body and by round seven, was missing a lot of shots, mostly due to Usyk's foot movement, and ended the round with a bloodied nose. In round eight, whilst in a neutral corner, Usyk landed a hard left, again buzzing Bellew, forcing him to move away against the ropes. Another left hand wobbled Bellew before Usyk finished him off with another left which dropped Bellew backwards with his head landing on the bottom rope. A brave Bellew tried to get up slowly and beat the count but referee Terry O'Connor stopped the fight. Judges Alejandro Cid and Steve Gray scored the first seven rounds 68–65 and 67–66 respectively in favour of Bellew, while Yury Koptsev had the fight 67–67.

== Aftermath ==
Afterwards, Bellew paid tribute to Usyk and announced his retirement from boxing, saying, "I have been doing this for 20 years, and it is over."

Usyk would later state that 2018 was the most difficult year of his career, but most successful. "We need to put goals in front of us and move towards them". There was a small concern during Bellew's post-fight interview as many felt he was clearly concussed. According to CompuBox, Usyk landed 112 of his 424 punches thrown (26%) and Bellew landed 61 of his 268 thrown (23%).

After defeating Bellew, Usyk declared his intention to move up to heavyweight and in turn would vacate all four belts.

== Undercard ==
Confirmed bouts:

Winner	Loser	Weight division/title belt(s) disputed	Result
(United Kingdom) Anthony Crolla	(Indonesia) Daud Yordan	WBA lightweight final eliminator	Unanimous decision
(United Kingdom) Ricky Burns	(United Kingdom) Scott Cardle	Lightweight (10 rounds)	3rd round TKO.
(United Kingdom) Josh Kelly	(Argentina) Walter Fabian Castillo	Welterweight (10 rounds)	1st round TKO.
(United Kingdom) David Allen	(Argentina) Ariel Bracamonte	Heavyweight (10 rounds)	7th round RTD
(United Kingdom) Richard Riakporhe	(United Kingdom) Sam Hyde	vacant WBA Inter-Continental cruiserweight title	8th round TKO.
(Ukraine) Dmytro Mytrofanov	(Netherlands) Gino Kanters	Middleweight (4 rounds)	Draw
(Georgia (country)) Alexandre Kartozia	(Spain) Daniel Robles	Heavyweight (4 rounds)	Draw

== Broadcasting ==
In Ukraine, the fight drew a 5.5 rating with 37.7 share in the commercial (Note: Viewers aged 18–54 from cities with population 50,000+) demographic.

Country	Broadcaster
Australia	Fox Sports
Latin America	Canal Space
United States	DAZN
United Kingdom	Sky Sports
Ukraine	Inter

== Notes ==
Preceded by vs. Murat Gassiev	Oleksandr Usyk's bouts 10 November 2018	Succeeded by vs. Chazz Witherspoon
Preceded by vs. David Haye II	Tony Bellew's bouts 10 November 2018	Retired
