= Luke Watkins =

English boxer (born 1989)

Personal information
- Nickname: The Duke
- Nationality: English
- Born: 27 November 1989 (age 36) Swindon, Wiltshire, England
- Height: 6 ft 1 in (185 cm)
- Weight: Cruiserweight

Boxing career
- Stance: Orthodox

Boxing record
- Total fights: 19
- Wins: 16
- Win by KO: 11
- Losses: 3

Luke Watkins (born 27 November 1989) is an English professional boxer who held the Commonwealth cruiserweight title from 2017 to 2018.

== Professional career ==
Watkins made his professional debut on 20 September 2014, scoring a fourth-round technical knockout (TKO) victory over David Vicena at the Wembley Arena in London.

After compiling a record of 11–0 (7 KOs) he faced Robin Dupre for the vacant Commonwealth cruiserweight title on 7 October 2017 at the York Hall in London. Watkins knocked his opponent down in round four before securing a sixth-round TKO to capture his first professional title. His first defence came two months later against Mike Stafford on 2 December at the Leicester Arena. After encountering some difficulties in the first few rounds, Watkins began to take control midway through the fight, opening a cut below Stafford's eye in the sixth round. At the end of the seventh, Stafford's corner warned their man that they would call off the fight to save him from further punishment. Seeing no improvements from Stafford, his corner called a halt to the contest at the end of the eighth round, awarding Watkins a stoppage win by corner retirement (RTD).

His second defence came against WBA Continental Cruiserweight champion and 2016 Olympian, Lawrence Okolie, on 6 June 2018 at York Hall in London, with Okolie's WBA title also on the line. Watkins suffered two knockdowns in the third round, the second of which promoted referee Michael Alexander to call a halt to the contest, handing Watkins the first defeat of his career to lose his Commonwealth title by TKO.

His next fight was against Isaac Chamberlain – who also lost to Okolie in his previous fight – on 27 October 2018 at the Copper Box Arena in London. After a hard-fought ten rounds, Watkins suffered his second defeat, losing via points decision (PTS). Referee Kieran McCann scored the bout 95–94 in favour of Chamberlain, with the defining factor being a late knockdown scored by Chamberlain in the final seconds of the tenth and final round.

== Professional boxing record ==
19 fights	16 wins	3 losses
By knockout	11	2
By decision	5	1

No.	Result	Record	Opponent	Type	Round, time	Date	Location	Notes
19	Loss	16–3	(United Kingdom) Jordan Thompson	TKO	6 (10)	22 Apr 2023	(United Kingdom) Cardiff International Arena, Cardiff	
18	Win	16–2	(United Kingdom) Iain Martell	TKO	6 (10)	30 Jun 2022	(United Kingdom) Civic Hall, Grays	
17	Win	15–2	(United Kingdom) Tyrone Williams	KO	1 (4)	18 Sep 2021	(United Kingdom) MECA, Regent Circus, Swindon	
16	Win	14–2	(United Kingdom) Ossie Jervier	PTS	6	27 Apr 2019	(United Kingdom) Oasis Leisure Centre, Swindon, England	
15	Loss	13–2	(United Kingdom) Isaac Chamberlain	PTS	10	27 Oct 2018	(United Kingdom) Copper Box Arena, London, England	
14	Loss	13–1	(United Kingdom) Lawrence Okolie	TKO	3 (12), 1:40	6 Jun 2018	(United Kingdom) York Hall, London, England	Lost Commonwealth cruiserweight title; For WBA Continental cruiserweight title
13	Win	13–0	(United Kingdom) Mike Stafford	RTD	8 (12), 3:00	2 Dec 2017	(United Kingdom) Leicester Arena, Leicester, England	Retained Commonwealth cruiserweight title
12	Win	12–0	(United Kingdom) Robin Dupre	TKO	6 (12), 2:16	7 Oct 2017	(United Kingdom) York Hall, London, England	Won vacant Commonwealth cruiserweight title
11	Win	11–0	(Republic of Ireland) Ian Tims	KO	4 (10), 1:13	10 Jun 2017	(United Kingdom) Odyssey Arena, Belfast, Northern Ireland	
10	Win	10–0	(Czech Republic) Jiri Svacina	TKO	4 (8), 2:38	8 Apr 2017	(United Kingdom) Oasis Leisure Centre, Swindon, England	
9	Win	9–0	(Lithuania) Dmitrij Kalinovskij	PTS	6	16 Jul 2016	(United Kingdom) York Hall, London, England	
8	Win	8–0	(Latvia) Reinis Porozovs	TKO	5 (6), 1:40	10 Jun 2016	(United Kingdom) Grange Leisure Centre, Swindon, England	
7	Win	7–0	(United Kingdom) Tony Cruise	PTS	6	7 May 2016	(United Kingdom) York Hall, London, England	
6	Win	6–0	(Hungary) Sandor Balogh	TKO	2 (6), 1:00	20 Dec 2015	(United Kingdom) Grange Leisure Centre, Swindon, England	
5	Win	5–0	(Hungary) Tamas Bajzath	PTS	8	24 Oct 2015	(United Kingdom) Oasis Leisure Centre, Swindon, England	
4	Win	4–0	(Hungary) Jeno Markhot	TKO	3 (8), 1:32	13 Feb 2015	(United Kingdom) Oasis Leisure Centre, Swindon, England	
3	Win	3–0	(Hungary) Istvan Kun	KO	5 (6), 1:35	1 Nov 2014	(United Kingdom) Oasis Leisure Centre, Swindon, England	
2	Win	2–0	(Czech Republic) Martin Horal	MD	4	27 Sep 2014	Sparkassen-Arena, Kiel, Germany	
1	Win	1–0	(Czech Republic) David Vicena	TKO	4 (6), 2:00	20 Sep 2014	(United Kingdom) Wembley Arena, London, England	

Sporting positions
Regional boxing titles
Vacant Title last held by Denton Daley	Commonwealth cruiserweight champion 7 October 2017 – 6 June 2018	Succeeded by Lawrence Okolie
