= Maxim Prodan =

Ukrainian boxer

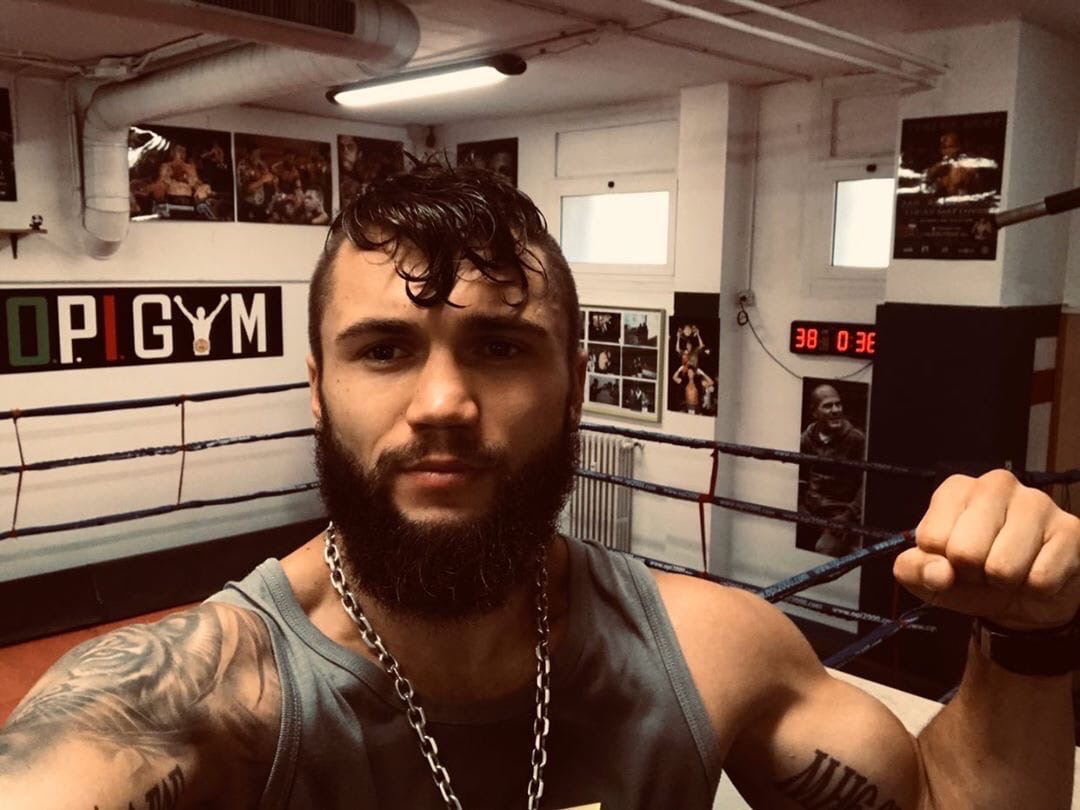

Personal information
- Nationality: Ukrainian; Romanian
- Born: February 13, 1993 (age 33) Rynhach, Chernivtsi Oblast, Ukraine
- Height: 5 ft 8 in (173 cm)
- Weight: Welterweight

Boxing career
- Stance: Orthodox

Boxing record
- Total fights: 25
- Wins: 22
- Win by KO: 16
- Losses: 2
- Draws: 1

Maxim Volodymyrovych Prodan (Ukrainian: Максим Володимирович Продан; born 13 February 1993) is a Ukrainian professional boxer who held the IBF International welterweight title from 2019 to September 2021.

== Early life ==
Prodan was born in Rynhach, Novoselytsia Raion, Chernivtsi region, Ukraine.

He was born to Ukrainian parents of Romanian ancestry. His mother was born in Rynhach (Chernivtsi region) and his father comes from Hrozyntsi. Prodan started practicing boxing as a child.

He attended high school in Novoselytsia (graduating in 2008) and in 2010 graduated from Kamianets-Podilskyi Lyceum with enhanced military and physical training.

In 2014 he received his bachelor's degree in physical education at Chernivtsi University. In 2011 he became Candidate for Master of Sport.

In 2014 he moved to Bovisio Masciago, in Italy, where he currently lives.

== Career ==
At the age of 12 he moved to his aunt in Novoselytsia, where he began boxing.

From his home base in Ukraine, he boxed at regional, national, and later international tournaments. At the age of 18, he became a Candidate in Masters of Sports in boxing.

He studied at the sporting club "Boyan-Kolos" from 2007 to 2012. Prodan fought 60 times as an amateur, recording 50 victories.

At the age of 22, he debuted as a professional, defeating Hungarian Krisztian Duka by knockout. As of September 2021, Prodan won 19 out of 20 fights (15 by knockout), recording one draw due to an arm injury.

On 8 March 2019, he won the IBF International belt, defeating Belgian Steve Jamoye.

On 25 September 2021, he lost his IBF International Belt against Florian Marku. This was his first and only defeat in international career.

== Professional boxing record ==
25 fights	22 wins	2 losses
By knockout	16	1
By decision	6	1
Draws	1	

No.	Result	Record	Opponent	Type	Round, time	Date	Location	Notes
25	Win	22–2–1	(Argentina) Miguel Cesario Antin	UD	8	16 Dec 2023	Palasport Le Cupole, Turin, Italy	
24	Win	21–2–1	(Italy) Mirko Marchetti	KO	2 (8)	24 Mar 2023	Allianz Cloud, Milan, Italy	
23	Win	20–2–1	(Nicaragua) Reynaldo Mora	PTS	6	29 Jul 2022	Stadio Marcello Torre, Pagani, Italy	
22	Loss	19–2–1	(Venezuela) Luis Enrique Romero	TKO	7 (10)	13 May 2022	Allianz Cloud, Milan, Italy	
21	Loss	19–1–1	(Albania) Florian Marku	SD	10	25 Sep 2021	(United Kingdom) Tottenham Hotspur Stadium, London, England	Lost IBF International welterweight title
20	Win	19–0–1	(Italy) Nicola Cristofori	TKO	10 (10), 1:39	26 Feb 2021	Allianz Cloud, Milan, Italy	Retained IBF International welterweight title
19	Win	18–0–1	(United Kingdom) Tony Dixon	SD	10	25 Oct 2019	Allianz Cloud, Milan, Italy	Retained IBF International welterweight title
18	Win	17–0–1	(Georgia (country)) Nika Nakashidze	PTS	6	28 Jun 2019	Allianz Cloud, Milan, Italy	
17	Win	16–0–1	(Belgium) Steve Jamoye	UD	10	8 Mar 2019	Superstudio, Milan, Italy	Won IBF International interim welterweight title
16	Win	15–0–1	(Nicaragua) Erick Lopez	PTS	8	20 Oct 2018	Teatro Principe, Milan, Italy	
15	Win	14–0–1	(Hungary) Gyorgy Mizsei	KO	3 (6)	19 May 2018	Teatro Principe, Milan, Italy	
14	Win	13–0–1	(Panama) Manuel Largacha	TKO	6 (8), 2:19	17 Feb 2018	Teatro Principe, Milan, Italy	
13	Win	12–0–1	(Serbia) Zeljko Kovacevic	TKO	1 (8), 2:40	25 Nov 2017	Palasport Salvador Allende, Cinisello Balsamo, Italy	
12	Win	11–0–1	(Serbia) Sasa Janjic	KO	3 (8), 1:42	7 Oct 2017	Teatro Principe, Milan, Italy	
11	Draw	10–0–1	(Panama) Manuel Largacha	PTS	8	27 May 2017	Teatro Principe, Milan, Italy	
10	Win	10–0	(Hungary) Istvan Dernanecz	TKO	1 (8), 2:57	1 Apr 2017	Teatro Principe, Milan, Italy	
9	Win	9–0	(Serbia) Petar Peric	KO	5 (6), 2:10	18 Feb 2017	Teatro Principe, Milan, Italy	
8	Win	8–0	(Bosnia and Herzegovina) Nerdin Fejzovic	KO	4 (6)	16 Dec 2016	Teatro Principe, Milan, Italy	
7	Win	7–0	(Italy) Liam Dede'	TKO	1 (6)	15 Oct 2016	Teatro Principe, Milan, Italy	
6	Win	6–0	(Hungary) Jozsef Gerebecz	KO	1 (6)	14 May 2016	Teatro Principe, Milan, Italy	
5	Win	5–0	(Bosnia and Herzegovina) Stanislav Sakic	KO	3 (6), 1:13	7 Nov 2015	Teatro Principe, Milan, Italy	
4	Win	4–0	(Croatia) Ivica Gogosevic	KO	2 (6)	17 Oct 2015	Teatro Principe, Milan, Italy	
3	Win	3–0	(Hungary) Valentin Bokros	TKO	2 (4)	4 Jul 2015	Teatro Principe, Milan, Italy	
2	Win	2–0	(Croatia) Silvije Kebet	TKO	3 (4)	20 Jun 2015	Teatro Principe, Milan, Italy	
1	Win	1–0	(Hungary) Krisztian Duka	KO	3 (4)	30 May 2015	Teatro Principe, Milan, Italy	
