= Deion Jumah =

English boxer (born 1989)

Personal information
- Nickname: The Ghost
- Nationality: English
- Born: 18 July 1989 (age 36) Hammersmith, London, England
- Height: 6 ft 1 in (185 cm)
- Weight: Cruiserweight

Boxing career
- Reach: 78 in (198 cm)
- Stance: Southpaw

Boxing record
- Total fights: 15
- Wins: 14
- Win by KO: 7
- Losses: 1

Deion Jumah (born 18 July 1989) is a former English professional boxer. He held the English Cruiserweight title from 2019 to 2020.

== Professional career ==
Jumah made his professional debut on 2 February 2013, scoring a first-round knockout (KO) victory against Ruslan Bitarov at the Max-Schmeling-Halle in Berlin, Germany.

After compiling a record of 10–0 (5 KOs) he faced Ossie Jervier for the vacant Southern Area cruiserweight title on 2 December 2018 at the York Hall in London. Jumah dropped his opponent to the canvas in the fifth round. Jervier made it back to his feet only to be met by a flurry of punches from Jumah, prompting referee Bob Williams to call a halt to the contest to hand Jumah his first professional title via technical knockout (TKO).

In his next fight he returned to the York Hall to face former Commonwealth champion Wadi Camacho for the vacant English cruiserweight title on 7 September 2019. Jumah landed a counter-left hand in the fifth round to knock Camacho to the canvas. The former Commonwealth champion was back to his feet by the referee's count of six. With Camacho looking unsteady, referee Marcus McDonnell called a halt to the contest at the count of eight to hand Jumah his second professional title via TKO.

The first defence of his English title came four months later against Sam Hyde on 19 January 2020 at the Woodhouse Park Lifestyle Centre in Manchester. The bout served as a final eliminator for the British cruiserweight title. After twelve closely contested rounds Jumah retained his title with a unanimous decision (UD) victory, becoming the mandatory challenger to reigning British champion Richard Riakporhe. Two judges scored the bout 115–113 and the third judge scored it 115–114.

He faced Riakporhe at Wembley Arena on 26 March 2022, although by that stage his opponent had long since vacated the British title. Jumah was knocked out in the eighth round to suffer his first professional defeat.

Jumah retired from professional boxing in November 2022 due to an eye injury he sustained while sparring in preparation for a British cruiserweight title fight against Mikael Lawal.

== Professional boxing record ==
15 fights	14 wins	1 loss
By knockout	7	1
By decision	7	0

No.	Result	Record	Opponent	Type	Round, time	Date	Location	Notes
15	Loss	14–1	(United Kingdom) Richard Riakporhe	KO	8 (10) 0:35	26 Mar 2022	(United Kingdom) Wembley Arena, London, England	
14	Win	14–0	(Namibia) Willbeforce Shihepo	PTS	4	26 Feb 2022	(United Kingdom) Circus Tavern, Purfleet, England	
13	Win	13–0	(United Kingdom) Sam Hyde	UD	12	19 Jan 2020	(United Kingdom) Woodhouse Park Lifestyle Centre, Manchester, England	Retained English cruiserweight title
12	Win	12–0	(United Kingdom) Wadi Camacho	TKO	5 (10), 2:08	7 Sep 2019	(United Kingdom) York Hall, London, England	Won vacant English cruiserweight title
11	Win	11–0	(United Kingdom) Ossie Jervier	TKO	5 (10), 2:08	1 Dec 2018	(United Kingdom) York Hall, London, England	Won vacant Southern Area cruiserweight title
10	Win	10–0	(Croatia) Tomislav Rudan	KO	3 (6), 0:58	19 May 2018	(United Kingdom) York Hall, London, England	
9	Win	9–0	(Bulgaria) Kristian Kirilov	TKO	1 (6), 1:11	3 Mar 2018	(United Kingdom) York Hall, London, England	
8	Win	8–0	(United Kingdom) Colin Farricker	PTS	6	30 Jan 2016	(United Kingdom) Copper Box Arena, London, England	
7	Win	7–0	(Ukraine) Vasyl Kondor	UD	6	12 Dec 2015	Brøndbyhallen, Brøndby, Denmark	
6	Win	6–0	(Italy) Fabrizio Leone	UD	6	21 Nov 2015	TUI Arena, Hanover, Germany	
5	Win	5–0	(Czech Republic) Karel Horejsek	RTD	3 (6), 3:00	20 Jun 2015	Ballerup Super Arena, Ballerup, Denmark	
4	Win	4–0	(Czech Republic) Josef Krivka	TKO	2 (6), 1:23	6 Dec 2014	Große EWE Arena, Oldenburg, Germany	
3	Win	3–0	(Czech Republic) Jiri Svacina	UD	6	19 Oct 2013	Koldinghallerne, Kolding, Denmark	
2	Win	2–0	(Ukraine) Igor Pylypenko	UD	4	9 Feb 2013	Blue Water Dokken, Esbjerg, Denmark	
1	Win	1–0	(Lithuania) Ruslan Bitarov	KO	1 (4), 2:59	2 Feb 2013	Max-Schmeling-Halle, Berlin, Germany	

Sporting positions
Regional boxing titles
Vacant Title last held by Wadi Camacho	Southern Area cruiserweight champion 1 December 2018 – February 2019	Vacant Title next held by Daniel Mendes
Vacant Title last held by Arfan Iqbal	English cruiserweight champion 7 September 2019 – September 2020; Vacated	Vacant
