= Sam Hyde (boxer) =

English boxer (born 1993)

Personal information
- Nickname: Nowhere2
- Nationality: English
- Born: 26 October 1993 (age 32)
- Weight: Cruiserweight

Boxing career
- Stance: Orthodox

Boxing record
- Total fights: 18
- Wins: 15
- Win by KO: 8
- Losses: 2
- Draws: 1

Sam Hyde (born 26 October 1993) is an English professional boxer.

== Professional career ==
Hyde made his professional debut on 8 March 2014, scoring a four-round points decision (PTS) victory against Elvis Dube at the Bowlers Exhibition Centre in Manchester.

After compiling a record of 13–0–1 (6 KOs) he faced Richard Riakporhe for the vacant WBA Inter-Continental cruiserweight title on 10 November 2018 at the Manchester Arena. The bout served as part of the undercard for the Oleksandr Usyk vs. Tony Bellew undisputed world title fight. After comfortably outboxing Riakporhe for the first seven rounds, the tables turned in the eighth when Riakporhe landed a powerful right hand, causing damage to Hyde's eye and backing him up against the ropes. Riakporhe followed up with a sustained attack. The swelling on Hyde's eye worsened, prompting his trainer, Joe Gallagher, to throw in the towel in order to save his charge from further damage, handing Hyde the first defeat of his professional career via technical knockout (TKO). At the time of the stoppage Hyde was ahead on all three judges' scorecards, with two judges scoring the bout 68–65 and the third scoring it 67–66.

He bounced back from defeat with two TKO victories in 2019—Jozef Jurko in April and Jiri Svacina in September—before challenging the English cruiserweight champion Deion Jumah on 19 January 2020 at the Woodhouse Park Lifestyle Centre in Manchester. The bout was a final eliminator for Hyde's former foe, Richard Riakporhe, and his British cruiserweight title. After twelve closely contested rounds Hyde suffered the second defeat of his career, losing via unanimous decision (UD) with two judges scoring the bout 115–113 and the third scoring it 115–114.

== Professional boxing record ==
| 18 fights | 15 wins | 2 losses |
|---|---|---|
| By knockout | 8 | 1 |
| By decision | 7 | 1 |
| Draws | 1 | |

| No. | Result | Record | Opponent | Type | Round, time | Date | Location | Notes |
|---|---|---|---|---|---|---|---|---|
| 18 | Loss | 15–2–1 | Deion Jumah | UD | 12 | 19 Jan 2020 | Woodhouse Park Lifestyle Centre, Manchester, England | For English cruiserweight title |
| 17 | Win | 15–1–1 | Jiri Svacina | TKO | 4 (6), 2:05 | 22 Sep 2019 | Woodhouse Park Lifestyle Centre, Manchester, England | |
| 16 | Win | 14–1–1 | Jozef Jurko | TKO | 2 (6), 1:51 | 20 Apr 2018 | The O2 Arena, London, England | |
| 15 | Loss | 13–1–1 | Richard Riakporhe | TKO | 8 (10), 2:41 | 10 Nov 2018 | Manchester Arena, Manchester, England | For vacant WBA Inter-Continental cruiserweight title |
| 14 | Win | 13–0–1 | Dmitrij Kalinovskij | TKO | 5 (6), 2:30 | 27 Apr 2018 | Manchester Arena, Manchester, England | |
| 13 | Win | 12–0–1 | Toni Visic | PTS | 6 | 25 Feb 2018 | Victoria Warehouse, Manchester, England | |
| 12 | Win | 11–0–1 | Gheorghe Danut | PTS | 6 | 7 Oct 2017 | Manchester Arena, Manchester, England | |
| 11 | Win | 10–0–1 | Michael Pareo | TKO | 5 (8), 2:54 | 16 Jun 2017 | Bowlers Exhibition Centre, Manchester, England | |
| 10 | Win | 9–0–1 | Tomislav Rudan | KO | 2 (8), 0:50 | 17 Mar 2017 | Bowlers Exhibition Centre, Manchester, England | |
| 9 | Win | 8–0–1 | Blaise Mendouo | PTS | 6 | 22 Oct 2016 | Bowlers Exhibition Centre, Manchester, England | |
| 8 | Win | 7–0–1 | Rolandas Cesna | PTS | 8 | 5 Mar 2016 | Middleton Arena, Middleton, England | |
| 7 | Win | 6–0–1 | Mateusz Gatek | TKO | 2 (4), 2:19 | 16 Dec 2015 | Village Hotel, Ashton-under-Lyne, England | |
| 6 | Win | 5–0–1 | David Vicena | TKO | 1 (4), 1:11 | 31 Oct 2015 | Castle Leisure Centre, Bury, England | |
| 5 | Win | 4–0–1 | Jason Jones | PTS | 4 | 14 Mar 2015 | Victoria Warehouse, Manchester, England | |
| 4 | Win | 3–0–1 | Jakub Wójcik | PTS | 4 | 28 Nov 2014 | Bowlers Exhibition Centre, Manchester, England | |
| 3 | Draw | 2–0–1 | Wayne Brooks | PTS | 4 | 13 Sep 2014 | Phones 4u Arena, Manchester, England | |
| 2 | Win | 2–0 | Tommy Gifford | TKO | 1 (4), 0:56 | 19 Apr 2014 | Phones 4u Arena, Manchester, England | |
| 1 | Win | 1–0 | Elvis Dube | PTS | 4 | 8 Mar 2014 | Bowlers Exhibition Centre, Manchester, England | |
