= Isaac Chamberlain =

English boxer

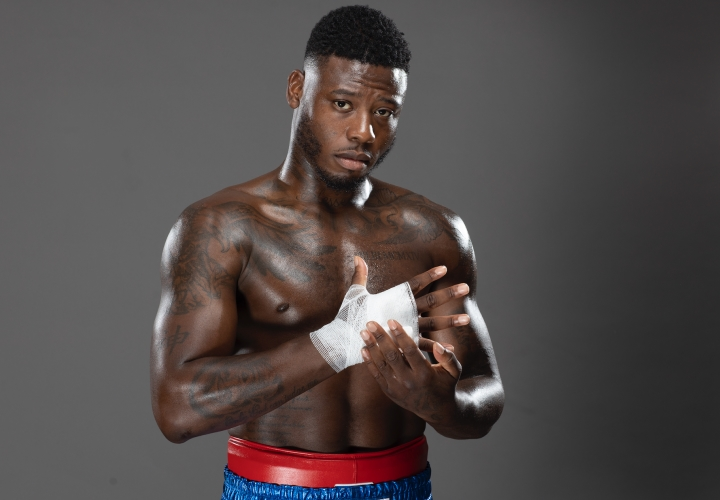
- Isaac Chamberlain in 2021

Personal information
- Nicknames: Chambo, IC
- Nationality: British
- Born: 3 March 1994 (age 32) Brixton, London, England
- Height: 6 ft 3in (1.90m)
- Weight: Cruiserweight

Boxing career
- Reach: 78 in (198 cm)
- Stance: Orthodox

Boxing record
- Total fights: 21
- Wins: 18
- Win by KO: 10
- Losses: 3

Isaac Chamberlain (born 3 March 1994) is a British professional boxer. He held the British and Commonwealth cruiserweight titles from 2023 to 2024.

== Professional career ==
Chamberlain made his professional debut in January 2015, defeating Moses Matovu in a four-round points victory.

In September 2016, Chamberlain won the BBBofC Southern Area cruiserweight title with a points victory over Wadi Camacho.

He fought London rival Lawrence Okolie on 3 February 2018 at the O2 Arena in a Sky Sports card headlined "British Beef", losing a wide unanimous decision after having been knocked down twice. In preparation for the fight, Chamberlain visited Ukraine to spar with cruiserweights Oleksandr Usyk and Mateusz Masternak.

Chamberlain has worked as a sparring partner for former WBC heavyweight champion Deontay Wilder.

Sky Sports produced a documentary on Chamberlain's life, called 'Straight Outta Brixton'.

== Professional boxing record ==
19 fights	16 wins	3 losses
By knockout	8	0
By decision	8	3

No.	Result	Record	Opponent	Type	Round, time	Date	Location	Notes
19	Loss	16–3	Jack Massey	UD	12	15 Jun 2024	Selhurst Park, London, England	Lost the Commonwealth cruiserweight title and challenge for the vacant European cruiserweight title
18	Win	16–2	Mikael Lawal	UD	12	21 Oct 2023	York Hall, London, England	Won British and vacant Commonwealth cruiserweight titles
17	Win	15–2	Dylan Bregeon	PTS	8	16 Jun 2023	York Hall, London, England	
16	Loss	14–2	Chris Billam-Smith	UD	12	30 Jul 2022	Bournemouth International Centre, Bournemouth, England	For European and Commonwealth cruiserweight titles
15	Win	14–1	Dilan Prašović	KO	1 (10), 2:58	12 Dec 2021	Crystal Palace National Sports Centre, London, England	Won vacant IBF International cruiserweight title
14	Win	13–1	Ben Thomas	RTD	1 (6), 3:00	10 Sep 2021	Coventry Skydome, Coventry, England	
13	Win	12–1	Matt Sen	TKO	1 (8), 0:50	5 Sep 2020	Production Park Studios, Wakefield, England	
12	Win	11–1	Antony Woolery	TKO	3 (8), 1:27	22 Aug 2020	Fly By Nite Rehearsal Studios, Redditch, England	
11	Win	10–1	Luke Watkins	PTS	10	27 Oct 2018	Copper Box Arena, London, England	
10	Loss	9–1	Lawrence Okolie	UD	10	3 Feb 2018	O2 Arena, London, England	For vacant WBA Continental cruiserweight title
9	Win	9–0	Ossie Jervier	TKO	6 (8), 2:06	13 Oct 2017	York Hall, London, England	
8	Win	8–0	Ryan Crawford	TKO	2 (6), 2:25	1 Jul 2017	O2 Arena, London, England	
7	Win	7–0	Imantas Davidaitis	TKO	3 (6), 1:21	17 Mar 2017	York Hall, London, England	
6	Win	6–0	Wadi Camacho	PTS	10	29 Sep 2016	York Hall, London, England	Won Southern Area cruiserweight title
5	Win	5–0	Russ Henshaw	TKO	6 (6), 2:20	16 Apr 2016	First Direct Arena, Leeds, England	
4	Win	4–0	Igoris Borucha	PTS	4	10 Oct 2015	York Hall, London, England	
3	Win	3–0	Martyn Grainger	PTS	4	28 May 2015	York Hall, London, England	
2	Win	2–0	Jason Jones	PTS	4	11 Apr 2015	First Direct Arena, Leeds, England	
1	Win	1–0	Moses Matovu	PTS	4	31 Jan 2015	O2 Arena, London, England	

Sporting positions
Regional boxing titles
Preceded by Wadi Camacho	British Southern Area cruiserweight champion 29 September 2016 – February 2017; Vacated	Vacant Title next held by Wadi Camacho
