= Rynhach =

Village in Chernivtsi Oblast, Ukraine

Coordinates: 48°18′37″N 26°14′14″E

Rynhach (Ukrainian: Рингач; Romanian: Rângaci) is a village in Chernivtsi Raion, Chernivtsi Oblast, Ukraine. It belongs to Novoselytsia urban hromada, one of the hromadas of Ukraine.

This commune also administers the village of Shishkivtsi (Ukrainian: Шишківці, Romanian: Șișcăuți, German: Schischkoutz or Schiskoutz).

Until 18 July 2020, Rynhach belonged to Novoselytsia Raion. The raion was abolished in July 2020 as part of the administrative reform of Ukraine, which reduced the number of raions of Chernivtsi Oblast to three. The area of Novoselytsia Raion was split between Chernivtsi and Dniester Raions, with Rynhach being transferred to Chernivtsi Raion. In 2001, 92.96% of the inhabitants spoke Ukrainian as their native language, while 5.92% spoke Romanian.

== Natives ==
- Maxim Prodan, a professional boxer
