= Anthony Joshua vs. Oleksandr Usyk =

Boxing match

The Perfect Storm
- Date: 25 September 2021
- Venue: Tottenham Hotspur Stadium, Tottenham, London, England
- Title(s) on the line: WBA (Super), IBF, WBO, and IBO heavyweight titles

Tale of the tape
Boxer	Anthony Joshua	Oleksandr Usyk
Nickname	AJ	The Cat
Hometown	London, England	Simferopol, Ukraine
Pre-fight record	24–1 (22 KOs)	18–0 (13 KOs)
Age	31 years, 11 months	34 years, 8 months
Height	6 ft 6 in (198 cm)	6 ft 3 in (191 cm)
Weight	240 lb (109 kg)	221 1/4 lb (100 kg)
Style	Orthodox	Southpaw
Recognition	WBA (Super), IBF, WBO and IBO; Heavyweight Champion; The Ring/TBRB; No. 1 Ranked Heavyweight	WBO; No. 1 Ranked Heavyweight; IBF; No. 2 Ranked Heavyweight; WBA; No. 4 Ranked Heavyweight; Former undisputed cruiserweight champion The Ring No. 4 ranked pound-for-pound fighter The Ring/TBRB; No. 10 Ranked Heavyweight

Result
- Usyk wins via 12–round unanimous decision (117–112, 116–112, 115–113)

Anthony Joshua vs Oleksandr Usyk, billed as The Perfect Storm, was a professional boxing match that was contested between WBA (Super), IBF, WBO, and IBO heavyweight champion, Anthony Joshua, and a former undisputed cruiserweight champion and the WBO's heavyweight mandatory challenger, Oleksandr Usyk. The bout took place on 25 September 2021 at the Tottenham Hotspur Stadium, with Usyk winning by unanimous decision.

== Background ==
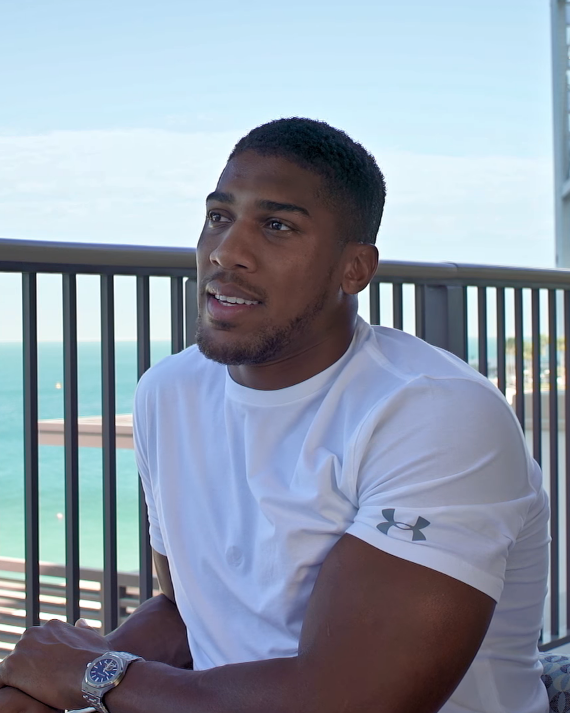
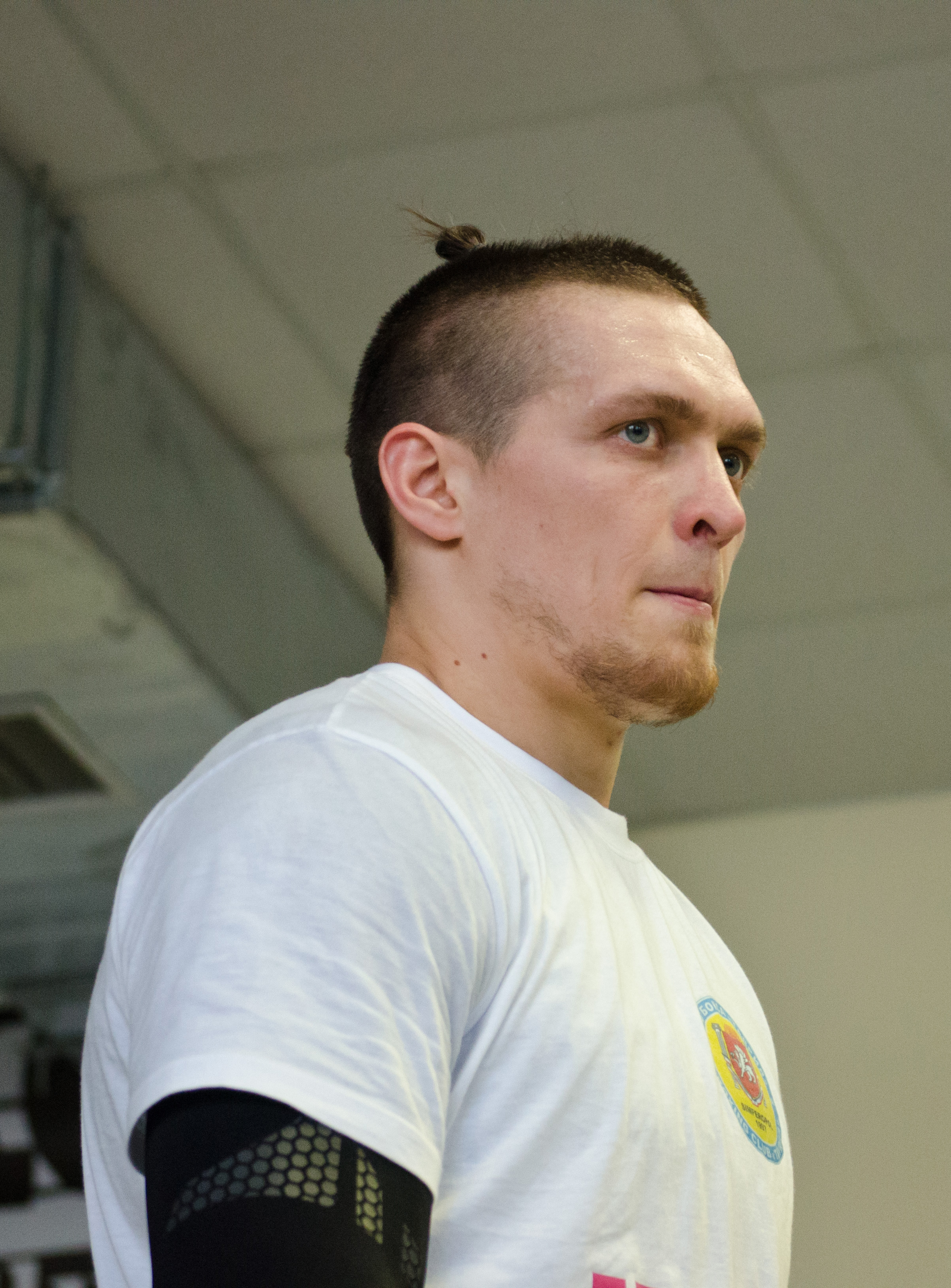
Anthony Joshua (left) and Oleksandr Usyk (right).

Usyk became the first ever four-belt undisputed cruiserweight champion in 2018 after winning the World Boxing Super Series tournament. Following the decision to move up to the heavyweight division in 2019, and after Joshua lost his titles against Andy Ruiz Jr in June of that year, Usyk successfully petitioned the WBO to be installed as their mandatory challenger. Per the WBO's rules, a 'super champion' is entitled to the mandatory challenger status in the event they move to a different weight class. Joshua regained his titles by defeating Ruiz in a rematch in December 2019, prompting the WBO to order a fight between Joshua and Usyk. The following day, the IBF also ordered Joshua to face their mandatory challenger, Kubrat Pulev. After Joshua fulfilled his IBF mandatory with a victory over Pulev in December 2020, the WBO held off on ordering a fight between Joshua and Usyk while talks progressed between the former and Tyson Fury for an undisputed heavyweight title bout.

In the meantime, Usyk's team entered into negotiations with Joe Joyce, with the intention of fighting for the WBO interim title. However, on 17 May, a day after Fury confirmed the date of a Joshua fight, the news broke that a judge had ordered Fury to fulfill a prior contractual obligation and face Deontay Wilder before September 2021. The following day the WBO issued Joshua's promoter, Eddie Hearn, with a "show cause" order, giving him 48 hours to provide proof of a contract between Joshua and Fury, and failure to do so would force Joshua to enter negotiations with Usyk. Hearn requested an extension on the deadline, which was denied by the WBO, who then ordered Joshua to reach a deal with Usyk within 10 days before holding a purse bid for rights to the fight.

On 25 June, Hearn announced that the bout would take place on 25 September, at the Tottenham Hotspur Stadium.

== Fight results ==
Oleksandr Usyk became only the third boxer in history – after Evander Holyfield and David Haye – to win world titles both at cruiserweight and heavyweight. At the same time, Anthony Joshua's defeat left the prospect of a highly anticipated undisputed unification bout with Tyson Fury in tatters.

According to CompuBox, Oleksandr Usyk connected more total punches than Anthony Joshua – 148 to 123. He was also more precise of the two opponents, landing 28% of punches thrown compared to Joshua's 19.2%. Usyk's landed punches were the most by a Joshua opponent. Usyk closed the show by landing 29 punches in round 12, the most by a Joshua opponent.

After the fight, Usyk performed a Cossack dance in the ring to celebrate his victory.

=== Scoring card by judges ===
1. (United Kingdom) Howard Foster (red): 113–115 for Usyk
2. (United States) Steve Weisfield (white): 112–116 for Usyk
3. (Ukraine) Viktor Fesechko (blue): 112–117 for Usyk

== Reception ==
Critics universally praised Usyk's performance during the fight. Coral Barry of BBC Sport called it "exceptional", "incredible" and a "masterclass". Chris Eubank Jr. called it "one of the biggest statements in boxing for a very long time". Lennox Lewis called it "a great tactical performance". Max Kellerman compared the match to Holmes vs. Spinks, in which a reign of a bigger boxer was likewise ended. Roy Jones Jr. reacted: "Usyk didn't beat [Joshua]. He dominated him".

Regarding the defender's performance, Coral Barry noted: "It was a strange, almost hapless display from Joshua which leaves his legacy as one of the heavyweight greats in ruins."

== Aftermath ==
Immediately after the fight, Anthony Joshua's team "activated in principle" the rematch clause to face Oleksandr Usyk in early 2022. Eddie Hearn warned that Joshua would be more aggressive in the rematch: "You'll see a different Anthony Joshua in this fight… This game plan is not box and move, this plan is to go in and hurt Usyk". On 10 October, Joshua officially exercised his contractual right to an immediate rematch. On 22 June, it was announced that a rematch was scheduled to take place in Jeddah, Saudi Arabia on 20 August with Usyk defending the WBA, WBO and IBF championship belts, and Joshua, as the challenger.

== Fight card ==
Weight Class		vs.		Method	Round	Time	Notes
Heavyweight	Oleksandr Usyk	def.	Anthony Joshua (c)	UD	12/12		^{Note 1}
Cruiserweight	Lawrence Okolie (c)	def.	Dilan Prašović	KO	3/12	1:57	^{Note 2}
Lightweight	Campbell Hatton	def.	Sonni Martinez	PTS	6/6
Light heavyweight	Callum Smith	def.	Lenin Castillo	KO	2/10	0:55
Welterweight	Florian Marku	def.	Maxim Prodan (c)	SD	10/10		^{Note 3}
Middleweight	Cristopher Ousley	def.	Khasan Baysangurov	MD	10/10		^{Note 4}
Light heavyweight	Daniel Lapin	def.	Pawel Martyniuk	PTS	6/6

^Note 1 For WBA (Super), IBF, WBO, and IBO heavyweight titles
^Note 2 For WBO junior-heavyweight title
^Note 3 For IBF International welterweight title
^Note 4 For vacant WBA Inter-Continental middleweight title

== Broadcasting ==
The undercard was televised for a 30 minute Freeview on Sky Sports Arena, Sky Sports Mix and Sky Sports Boxing YouTube. The main event was televised live on Sky Sports Box Office PPV in the United Kingdom and Ireland, as well as MEGOGO in Ukraine.

Country	Broadcaster			
Country	Free-to-air	Cable/Pay TV	PPV	Stream
United Kingdom	Sky Sports Boxing YouTube; Sky Sports Mix (undercard)	Sky Sports Arena; Sky Sports Main Event; Sky Showcase (undercard)	Sky Sports Box Office	
Ireland	Sky Sports Boxing YouTube; Sky Sports Mix (undercard)	Sky Sports Arena; Sky Sports Main Event; Sky Showcase (undercard)	Sky Sports Box Office	
Ukraine	—N/a			MEGOGO
France	—N/a	Canal+	—N/a	MyCanal
Netherlands	RTL 7		—N/a	RTL XL
Russia	REN TV	—N/a		
Worldwide	—N/a			DAZN^{excl.}

^excl. Live on DAZN in over 170 countries and territories, excluding the UK, Ireland, Ukraine, France, Netherlands, China, Israel and MENA

Preceded by vs. Kubrat Pulev	Anthony Joshua' bouts 25 September 2021	Succeeded by Rematch
Preceded by vs. Derek Chisora	Oleksandr Usyk's bouts 25 September 2021	Succeeded by Rematch
Awards
Previous: COVID-19 pandemic	The Ring Event of the Year; 2021	Next: Katie Taylor vs. Amanda Serrano
