= Florian Marku =

Albanian boxer (born 1992)

- Born: 29 September 1992 (age 34); Lushnjë, Albania
- Other names: TNT; Albanian King
- Height: 174 cm (5 ft 8 1/2 in)
- Division: Welterweight
- Fighting out of: London, England
- Years active: 2016–2017 (MMA); 2018–present (boxing)

Professional boxing record
- Total: 15
- Wins: 13
- By knockout: 8
- Losses: 1
- Draws: 1

Mixed martial arts record
- Total: 3
- Wins: 3
- By knockout: 1
- By submission: 2

Other information
- Boxing record from BoxRec
- Mixed martial arts record from Sherdog

Florian Marku is an Albanian professional boxer and former kickboxer and mixed martial artist.

== Professional career ==
Marku made his professional debut on 1 December 2018, scoring a first-round technical knockout (TKO) victory against Nikola Janicievic at the Beste Event Halle in Ulm, Germany.

In November 2020, after compiling a record of 7–0 (5 KOs), he signed a promotional contract with Eddie Hearn's Matchroom Sport. The following month, Marku faced Jamie Stewart at The SSE Arena in London. The bout served as part of the undercard for Anthony Joshua vs. Kubrat Pulev and was televised live on Sky Sports Box Office. In a fight which saw Marku drop his opponent to the canvas with a punch to the body in the second round, the result was controversially announced as a draw, with referee Marcus McDonnell scoring the bout 76–76.

Marku returned to The SSE Arena for his next fight, facing Rylan Charlton on 20 February 2021. Marku boxed well and controlled a lot of the fight but suffered a knockdown in the sixth round from a right hand by Charlton, Marku went on to secure an eighth-round TKO after Charlton's corner threw in the towel after their charge was on the receiving end of a sustained attack by Marku.

Marku had been scheduled to challenge IBF International welterweight champion Maxim Prodan on 7 August 2021 as part of Matchroom's Fight Camp, but the fight was postponed when Marku suffered an injury. On 25 August, it was announced that the bout would now take place on 25 September at Tottenham Hotspur Stadium on the undercard of Anthony Joshua vs. Oleksandr Usyk which he won via split decision after 10 rounds against Maxim Prodan.

On 31 March 2024 in London, Marku was scheduled to face Chris Kongo. On 20 December 2024 It was reported that Florian Marku was ‘facing up to five years in jail after arrest for wounding and illegal possession of a weapon’. The boxer had previously said where the charges came from.

== Professional boxing record ==
15 fights	13 wins	1 loss
By knockout	8	0
By decision	5	1
Draws	1	

No.	Result	Record	Opponent	Type	Round, time	Date	Location	Notes
15	Loss	13–1–1	Chris Kongo	UD	10	31 Mar 2024	The O2 Arena, London, England	For vacant IBO Intercontinental welterweight title
14	Win	13–0–1	Dylan Moran	TKO	1 (10), 0:54	2 Sep 2023	Manchester Arena, Manchester, England	
13	Win	12–0–1	Miguel Parra Ramirez	UD	10	25 Aug 2022	Arena Kombëtare, Tirana, Albania	Won vacant WBC Silver interim welterweight title
12	Win	11–0–1	Chris Jenkins	TKO	4 (10), 1:41	2 Apr 2022	Vertu Motors Arena, Newcastle, England	Retained IBF International welterweight title
11	Win	10–0–1	Jorick Luisetto	PTS	8	20 Nov 2021	The SSE Arena, London, England	
10	Win	9–0–1	Maxim Prodan	SD	10	25 Sep 2021	Tottenham Hotspur Stadium, London, England	Won IBF International welterweight title
9	Win	8–0–1	Rylan Charlton	TKO	8 (10), 2:18	20 Feb 2021	The SSE Arena, London, England	
8	Draw	7–0–1	Jamie Stewart	PTS	8	12 Dec 2020	The SSE Arena, London, England	
7	Win	7–0	Muma Mweemba	TKO	1 (6), 1:41	10 Nov 2020	BT Sport Studio, London, England	
6	Win	6–0	Nathan Bendon	PTS	6	13 Dec 2019	Ice Planet, Altrincham, England	
5	Win	5–0	Miroslav Serban	PTS	6	20 Sep 2019	indigo at The O2, London, England	
4	Win	4–0	Tommy Broadbent	KO	4 (4), 2:32	13 Jul 2019	The O2 Arena, London, England	
3	Win	3–0	Jan Marsalek	KO	1 (6), 2:18	27 Apr 2019	York Hall, London, England	
2	Win	2–0	Ivan Godor	TKO	2 (4), 1:01	23 Mar 2019	York Hall, London, England	
1	Win	1–0	Nikola Janicievic	TKO	1 (4), 2:14	1 Dec 2018	Beste Event Halle, Ulm, Germany	
