= Jack Massey (boxer) =

English boxer (born 1993)

Personal information
- Nickname: One Smack
- Nationality: British
- Born: 12 April 1993 (age 33) Chapel-en-le-Frith, Derbyshire, England
- Height: 193 cm (6 ft 4 in)
- Weight: Cruiserweight; Heavyweight

Boxing career
- Stance: Orthodox

Boxing record
- Total fights: 27
- Wins: 23
- Win by KO: 13
- Losses: 4

Jack Massey (born 12 April 1993) is an English professional boxer. He is a former European, Commonwealth and IBO cruiserweight champion.

== Professional career ==
His 16–0 undefeated streak earned Massey the chance to fight Richard Riakporhe for the vacant British cruiserweight title on 19 December 2021, at the York Hall in London, England. He lost the fight by unanimous decision, with scores of 115–113, 115–113 and 117–111.

After successfully bouncing back from his first professional loss, with a points win over Mohammad Farid, Massey faced Engin Karakaplan for the vacant IBF European cruiserweight title on 2 July 2021, at the Sheffield Arena Carpark in Sheffield, England. He captured the IBF regional silverware with a fourth-round knockout, flooring Karakaplan with a right-left combination.

Massey was booked to face Bilal Laggoune for the vacant IBO cruiserweight title on 26 November 2021, at the Whites Hotel in Bolton, England, in the main event of a Fightzone broadcast card. Massey made quick work of his opponent, as he won the fight by a third-round technical knockout. He first knocked Laggoune down with a left hook early in the third round, before forcing the referee to wave the bout off with a flurry of punches as soon as the fight resumed.

Massey made his heavyweight debut against former world heavyweight champion Joseph Parker, at the AO Arena, Manchester, on the undercard of Chris Eubank Jr vs. Liam Smith on 21 January 2023. Massey lost by unanimous decision, with scorecards of 96–93, 97–92, and 97–93.

Massey defeated the Commonwealth cruiserweight champion Isaac Chamberlain via unanimous decision at Selhurst Park in London on 15 June 2024 in a fight that was also for the vacant European belt.

He challenged IBF cruiserweight champion Jai Opetaia at Kingdom Arena in Riyadh, Saudi Arabia, on 12 October 2024, but lost the fight by stoppage in round six.

After more than a year away from the competitive boxing ring, Massey faced Ivan Gabriel Garcia in an eight-round contest at the Vaillant Arena in Derby on 29 November 2025. He won by technical knockout in the fourth round.

Massey took on Cheavon Clarke at Bournemouth International Centre on 6 June 2026. He sent his opponent to the canvas twice during the fourth round. However, Clarke recovered and delivered a knockdown of his own in round seven after which the referee halted the bout, handing Massey a technical knockout defeat.

== Professional boxing record ==
27 fights	23 wins	4 losses
By knockout	13	2
By decision	10	2

No.	Result	Record	Opponent	Type	Round, time	Date	Location	Notes
27	Loss	23–4	Cheavon Clarke	TKO	7 (10), 1:24	6 Jun 2026	Bournemouth International Centre, Bournemouth, England	
26	Win	23–3	Ivan Gabriel Garcia	TKO	4 (6), 0:50	29 Nov 2025	Valiant Arena, Derby, England	
25	Loss	22–3	Jai Opetaia	TKO	6 (12), 2:00	12 Oct 2024	Kingdom Arena, Riyadh, Saudi Arabia	For IBF and The Ring cruiserweight titles
24	Win	22–2	Isaac Chamberlain	UD	12	15 Jun 2024	Selhurst Park, London, England	Won the European and Commonwealth cruiserweight titles
23	Win	21–2	Steve Eloundou Ntere	TKO	1 (6), 1:57	20 Jan 2024	Echo Arena, Liverpool, England	
22	Loss	20–2	Joseph Parker	UD	10	21 Jan 2023	Manchester Arena, Manchester, England	
21	Win	20–1	Vaclav Pejsar	KO	2 (10), 0:34	30 Apr 2022	Whites Hotel, Bolton, England	
20	Win	19–1	Bilal Laggoune	TKO	3 (12), 1:36	26 Nov 2021	Whites Hotel, Bolton, England	Won vacant IBO cruiserweight title
19	Win	18–1	Engin Karakaplan	KO	4 (10), 1:30	2 Jul 2021	Sheffield Arena Carpark, Sheffield, England	Won vacant IBF European cruiserweight title
18	Win	17–1	Mohammad Ali Bayat Farid	PTS	8	28 Nov 2020	Church House, London, England	
17	Loss	16–1	Richard Riakporhe	UD	12	19 Dec 2019	York Hall, London, England	For vacant British cruiserweight title
16	Win	16–0	Kent Kauppinen	PTS	6	30 Sep 2019	King George's Hall, Blackburn, England	
15	Win	15–0	Jiri Svacina	TKO	4 (6)	22 Dec 2018	Manchester Arena, Manchester, England	
14	Win	14–0	Ian Tims	TKO	2 (8)	9 Jun 2018	Manchester Arena, Manchester, England	
13	Win	13–0	Blaise Mendouo	PTS	8	21 Oct 2017	First Direct Arena, Leeds, England	
12	Win	12–0	Russ Henshaw	TKO	1 (8), 2:59	18 Mar 2017	Devonshire Dome, Buxton, England	Won British Classic Challenge cruiserweight title
11	Win	11–0	Rolandas Cesna	PTS	6	1 Oct 2016	Devonshire Dome, Buxton, England	Won International Classic Challenge cruiserweight title
10	Win	10–0	Robert Rosenberg	KO	1 (8), 2:02	23 Apr 2016	Devonshire Dome, Buxton, England	
9	Win	9–0	Gogita Gorgiladze	TKO	5 (10), 1:33	23 Oct 2015	Devonshire Dome, Buxton, England	Won vacant WBC Silver Youth cruiserweight title
8	Win	8–0	Martyn Grainger	PTS	6	18 Jul 2015	Manchester Arena, Manchester, England	
7	Win	7–0	Mateusz Gatek	KO	3 (6), 1:08	14 Mar 2015	Victoria Warehouse, Manchester, England	
6	Win	6–0	Mitch Mitchell	PTS	6	18 Oct 2014	Victoria Warehouse, Manchester, England	
5	Win	5–0	Moses Matovu	PTS	4	13 Sep 2014	Scotiabank Convention Centre, Niagara Falls, Ontario, Canada	
4	Win	4–0	Danny Fleary	PTS	4	19 Apr 2014	Phones 4u Arena, Manchester, England	
3	Win	3–0	Tommy Glifford	TKO	2 (4), 2:03	15 Nov 2013	Winter Gardens, Blackpool, England	
2	Win	2–0	Will Burkin	PTS	4	12 Oct 2013	De Vere Whites Hotel, Bolton, England	
1	Win	1–0	Jody Meikle	TKO	3 (4), 1:39	20 Jul 2013	De Vere Whites Hotel, Bolton, England	

Sporting positions
Regional boxing titles
Vacant Title last held by Stephen Simmons	IBF European cruiserweight champion 2 July 2021 – November 2021	Vacant
Minor world boxing titles
Vacant Title last held by Kevin Lerena	IBO cruiserweight champion 27 November 2021 – 1 April 2023 vacated	Vacant Title next held by Floyd Masson
Major world boxing titles
Vacant Title last held by Kevin Lerena	WBC Youth cruiserweight champion Silver title 23 October 2015 – 2016	Vacant
