= Lawrence Okolie =

British boxer (born 1992)

Personal information
- Nicknames: The Sauce; The Octopus
- Born: 16 December 1992 (age 33) Hackney, London, England
- Height: 6 ft 5 in (196 cm)
- Weight: Cruiserweight; Bridgerweight; Heavyweight

Boxing career
- Reach: 82 1/2 in (210 cm)
- Stance: Orthodox

Boxing record
- Total fights: 24
- Wins: 23
- Win by KO: 17
- Losses: 1

Lawrence Okolie (born 16 December 1992) is a British professional boxer. He has held world championships in two weight classes, including the World Boxing Council (WBC) bridgerweight title in 2024, and the World Boxing Organization (WBO) cruiserweight title from 2021 to 2023. At regional level, he held the Commonwealth title twice between 2018 and 2019; the British title from 2018 to 2019; and the European title in 2019.

== Personal life ==
Okolie was born in Hackney, London to Nigerian parents of Igbo descent. He grew up in Stoke Newington and attended Stoke Newington School. While watching Anthony Joshua fighting in the 2012 Summer Olympics super heavyweight final, he decided to take boxing seriously and set a goal to make the 2016 Olympics.

He is a supporter of BoxWise, a UK-based non-profit social enterprise based around boxing.

He is also the co-owner of Thea, the Parisian inspired café and restaurant located in Dubai.

== Amateur career ==
Okolie represented Team GB as a heavyweight at the 2016 Rio Olympics. He beat Igor Pawel Jakubowski from Poland on points and made it to the Round of 16, where he lost to eventual bronze medalist Erislandy Savón of Cuba.

== Professional career ==
=== Cruiserweight ===
==== Early career ====
On 18 January 2017, Okolie announced his decision to turn professional at the age of 24, signing with Eddie Hearn and Matchroom Sport to compete in the cruiserweight division.

His first professional fight took place at the Manchester Arena in Manchester on 25 March 2017. It was on the undercard for the Jorge Linares vs. Anthony Crolla lightweight world championship fight. His opponent was 33 year old Geoffrey Cave, who had a record of no wins and two losses. The fight lasted 20 seconds and ended after Okolie landed two right hooks to the head of Cave. The referee stopped the fight immediately. His next bout took place in Glasgow, Scotland at The SSE Hydro on 15 April as part of the undercard for the world Ricky Burns vs. Julius Indongo super lightweight unification fight. He fought 35 year old journeyman Lukasz Rusiewicz. Okolie knocked Rusiewicz down twice in round one en route to a first-round stoppage. The time of stoppage was 2 minutes and 36 seconds.

Okolie was scheduled to fight on the undercard of the mega heavyweight fight Anthony Joshua vs. Wladimir Klitschko on 29 April at the Wembley Stadium in London. On 25 April, it was announced that he would fight Russell Henshaw (7–4, 2 KOs), who he was supposed to fight on his debut. On the night, Okolie tweeted that he would no longer be fighting on the undercard. The reason for this was due to Wembley council having a curfew of 11:00pm and the main event was due to start at 10:00pm. The other fights on the undercard went longer than expected.

Okolie fought on the Kell Brook vs. Errol Spence Jr. IBF world title undercard at Bramall Lane in Sheffield on 27 May, defeating Rudolf Helesic in the first round. Helesic was knocked down twice prior to the stoppage. On 1 July, Okolie recorded his fourth straight first-round stoppage win against Russell Henshaw. The fight was stopped after 2 minutes and 10 seconds into the round.

It was announced that Okolie would appear on the NXTGEN card on 1 September 2017, at the York Hall in London. Other prospects on the card included Conor Benn and fellow Olympians Joshua Buatsi and Joe Cordina. Okolie went the six-round distance for the first time in his career against Blaise Mendouo. He lost one round on the referee's scorecard, winning 59–54. Okolie was also taken past the first round for the first time in his professional career. In round four, Mendouo was dropped by a big right hand. Following the win, Okolie spoke to Sky Sports about going the distance, "It was useful to go the rounds, but was tough against an awkward opponent. It was a little bit scrappy, I couldn't get the rhythm of my opponent. I knew that this guy would be a lot more difficult than some of the other cruiserweight prospects." Okolie next fought on 28 October on the Anthony Joshua vs. Carlos Takam undercard at the Principality Stadium in Cardiff, Wales. His opponent was 36 year old Adam Williams. Okolie stopped Williams in the third round, extending his unbeaten record.

==== Okolie vs Chamberlain ====
Okolie next fought on 13 December 2017, closing off his first year as a professional at the York Hall in London. His opponent was Antonio Sousa in a six-round bout. Starting off with a stiff jab, Okolie dropped Sousa twice in round one and twice in round two before the referee stepped in at 1 minute and 4 seconds. After the fight, speaking on rival Isaac Chamberlain, he said, "He and Ted Bami are two cowards! He's calling me his easiest fight, he's saying stuff online. Here's the fight in February, let's go."

On 19 December, Sky Sports confirmed Okolie would fight Chamberlain on 3 February 2018 at The O2 Arena. The fighters had been calling each other out on social media over the months before the fight was finally signed. In January 2018, the WBA sanctioned the fight for their vacant Continental cruiserweight title. In front of 8,000 fans in attendance, Okolie scored a quick knockdown in the opening round, en route to a dominant one-sided unanimous decision (UD) win to capture the vacant WBA Continental title. In round two, after being warned a number of times, Chamberlain was docked a point for continuous holding. In round six, Okolie landed a right hand to Chamberlain, forcing his glove to touch the canvas for a second knockdown. Okolie also had a point deducted in round nine. After ten rounds, the judges scorecards read 98–89, 97–89 and 96–90 in favour of Okolie. After the fight, Okolie called out Welsh boxer Craig Kennedy (16–1, 8 KOs) for a fight on the Anthony Joshua vs. Joseph Parker undercard. The card averaged 230,000 viewers on Sky Sports.

==== Okolie vs Watkins ====
On 16 April 2018, Commonwealth cruiserweight champion Luke Watkins (13–0, 9 KOs) called out Okolie for a fight in the future. Nine days later, the Swindon Advertiser reported that Okolie's promoter, Eddie Hearn, had given the bout the green light to go ahead. On 26 April, a deal had been agreed for the fight to take place on 6 June at the York Hall in London. Okolie dropped Watkins twice on his way to a third-round stoppage victory. Referee Michael Alexander stopped the fight at 1 minute 40 seconds of the round. After the bout, Hearn stated the Commonwealth mandatory challenger, Wadi Camacho (20–7, 12 KOs), would likely be Okolie's only title defence before moving on to the British and European titles.

==== Okolie vs Askin ====
On 12 July 2018, the British Boxing Board of Control (BBBofC) ordered for Matty Askin (23–3–1, 15 KOs) to make a mandatory defence of his British cruiserweight title against Okolie by the end of November 2018. A purse bid was set for 8 August. On 7 August, Eddie Hearn announced the fight was confirmed and would take place on the Anthony Joshua vs. Alexander Povetkin undercard on 22 September at the Wembley Stadium in London on Sky Sports Box Office. Prior to the fight being made, Okolie vacated the Commonwealth cruiserweight title. In what was described as an 'ugly fight', Okolie defeated Askin via UD to claim the British cruiserweight title. The final scorecards read 116–110, 114–112 and 114–113 in Okolie's favour. Okolie lost a total of three points in fouls. During the middle rounds there was a lot of holding and wrestling. Okolie began using his head on the inside which resulted in him losing points.

==== Okolie vs Ngabu ====
On 26 October 2019 Okolie fought Yves Ngabu, ranked #9 by the IBF, #12 by the WBO and #13 by the WBA at cruiserweight. Okolie won the fight via seventh-round TKO.

=== WBO cruiserweight champion ===
==== Okolie vs Jeżewski, Głowacki ====
At the WBO federation convention in Tokyo in December 2019, it was decided that the Polish former two-time cruiserweight champion Krzysztof Głowacki would face Okolie for the vacant WBO cruiserweight title, and a bout between them was ordered. They had been scheduled to face each other on the undercard of Anthony Joshua vs. Kubrat Pulev on 12 December 2020, but the fight was postponed when Głowacki tested positive for COVID-19. As a result, Okolie instead faced Nikodem Jeżewski, also from Poland, and he won via second-round technical knockout after dropping Jeżewski three times, winning the vacant WBO International cruiserweight title.

The Okolie vs Głowacki world title bout was rescheduled for 20 March 2021, and was won by Okolie via sixth-round knockout. Glowacki was ranked #1 by the WBO and #3 by The Ring at cruiserweight. He conveyed his happiness at winning his first world title in his post-fight interview, saying "Obviously I'm happy, I feel blessed... It's amazing to be able to put an exclamation mark on my life with a world title." Okolie also revealed that his promoter Eddie Hearn had made a deal with him, promising to buy him a watch if he succeeded in becoming a world champion: "Four or five years ago, Eddie Hearn saw a boy from Hackney and said 'if you win a world title, I'll buy you a gold Rolex Sky Dweller'. Now I want my Sky Dweller. And he said I'd get another one if I unify, too!"

==== Okolie vs Prašović ====
Okolie made the first defence of his WBO cruiserweight title against WBO's #1 contender Dilan Prašović on 25 September 2021 on the undercard of Anthony Joshua vs. Oleksandr Usyk. Okolie retained his title, winning by third-round knockout.

==== Okolie vs Cieślak ====
It was announced on 7 January 2022, that Okolie would make his second WBO title defence against Michał Cieślak, who was at the time the #3 ranked WBO cruiserweight contender, on 27 February 2022. Okolie was seen as the 1/9 favourite to retain his title, while bookmakers had Cieślak as the 9/2 underdog. In a scrappy bout that featured a lot of grappling and rabbit punches, Okolie retained his world title with a unanimous decision victory, with judges' scorecards of 117–110, 116–111 and 115–112 in his favour.

==== Okolie vs Billam-Smith ====
Okolie fought long-time friend Chris Billam-Smith at the Vitality Stadium in Bournemouth on 27 May 2023. The fight was marred by a succession of warnings and two points deducted for Okolie, for holding and grappling. Billam-Smith knocked Okolie down three times during the fight, and won a majority decision. Two judges scored the bout 116–107 and 115–108 in favour of Billam-Smith while the third judge scored it even at 112–112.

=== WBC bridgerweight champion ===
==== Okolie vs. Rozanski ====
On 24 May 2024 in Rzeszow, Poland, Okolie challenged Łukasz Różański for the WBC bridgerweight title. He won by knockout in the first round.

=== Heavyweight ===
Okolie vacated the title on 8 October 2024, stating he intended to move up to compete at heavyweight. Later that month he signed a promotional deal with Frank Warren's Queensberry Promotions having previously had spells on the books of both its main rivals, Boxxer and Matchroom Sport.

He made his first appearance at heavyweight on 7 December 2024, with an opening round knockout of German boxer Hussein Muhamed at Wembley Arena in London. Okolie defeated Kevin Lerena by unanimous decision at Wembley Stadium in London on 19 July 2025.

On 3 December 2025, Okolie vs. Moses Itauma was ordered as a final eliminator by the WBC. Okolie defeated Ebenezer Tetteh at Mobolaji Johnson Arena in Lagos, Nigeria, on 21 December 2025, when his opponent retired on his stool at the end of the second round.

Okolie was scheduled to face Tony Yoka on 25 April 2026 in Paris, France. With four days to go, it was reported that Okolie tested positive for a banned substance, putting the fight at risk. Okolie posted on Social Media: "Before anyone starts imagining the worst, following my bicep injury last year, I sustained an elbow injury on the same arm during this camp. I had a treatment on it and now we are here. I truly hope sense prevails." Warren tried to find a British heavyweight as a replacement, but ultimately cancelled the event later that day. It was reported that Okolie tested positive for GHRP 2 and its M8 metabolite, substances that are synthetic compounds known to stimulate the release of human growth hormone. On 16 October 2026, it was announced that the case had been closed with no sanction being imposed after the WBC accepted Okolie's adverse test was a "result of the actions of a third party, without his knowledge or consent."

== Professional boxing record ==
24 fights	23 wins	1 loss
By knockout	17	0
By decision	6	1

No.	Result	Record	Opponent	Type	Round, time	Date	Location	Notes
24	Win	23–1	Ebenezer Tetteh	RTD	2 (10), 3:00	21 Dec 2025	Mobolaji Johnson Arena, Lagos, Nigeria	
23	Win	22–1	Kevin Lerena	UD	10	19 Jul 2025	Wembley Stadium, London, England	Retained WBC Silver heavyweight title
22	Win	21–1	Hussein Muhamed	KO	1 (10), 2:14	7 Dec 2024	Wembley Arena, London, England	Won vacant WBC Silver heavyweight title
21	Win	20–1	Łukasz Różański	KO	1 (12), 2:55	24 May 2024	Hala Podpromie, Rzeszów, Poland	Won WBC bridgerweight title
20	Loss	19–1	Chris Billam-Smith	MD	12	27 May 2023	Vitality Stadium, Bournemouth, England	Lost WBO cruiserweight title
19	Win	19–0	David Light	UD	12	25 Mar 2023	AO Arena, Manchester, England	Retained WBO cruiserweight title
18	Win	18–0	Michał Cieślak	UD	12	27 Feb 2022	The O2 Arena, London, England	Retained WBO cruiserweight title
17	Win	17–0	Dilan Prašović	KO	3 (12), 1:57	25 Sep 2021	Tottenham Hotspur Stadium, London, England	Retained WBO cruiserweight title
16	Win	16–0	Krzysztof Głowacki	TKO	6 (12), 0:46	20 Mar 2021	The SSE Arena, London, England	Won vacant WBO cruiserweight title
15	Win	15–0	Nikodem Jeżewski	TKO	2 (12), 1:45	12 Dec 2020	The SSE Arena, London, England	Won vacant WBO International cruiserweight title
14	Win	14–0	Yves Ngabu	TKO	7 (12), 2:28	26 Oct 2019	The O2 Arena, London, England	Won European cruiserweight title
13	Win	13–0	Mariano Angel Gudino	TKO	7 (10), 2:59	20 Jul 2019	The O2 Arena, London, England	Retained WBA Continental cruiserweight title
12	Win	12–0	Wadi Camacho	TKO	4 (12), 2:00	23 Mar 2019	Copper Box Arena, London, England	Retained British cruiserweight title; Won Commonwealth cruiserweight title
11	Win	11–0	Tamas Lodi	TKO	3 (10), 1:13	2 Feb 2019	The O2 Arena, London, England	Retained WBA Continental cruiserweight title
10	Win	10–0	Matty Askin	UD	12	22 Sep 2018	Wembley Stadium, London, England	Won British cruiserweight title
9	Win	9–0	Luke Watkins	TKO	3 (12), 1:40	6 Jun 2018	York Hall, London, England	Retained WBA Continental cruiserweight title; Won Commonwealth cruiserweight title
8	Win	8–0	Isaac Chamberlain	UD	10	3 Feb 2018	The O2 Arena, London, England	Won vacant WBA Continental cruiserweight title
7	Win	7–0	Antonio Sousa	TKO	2 (6), 1:04	13 Dec 2017	York Hall, London, England	
6	Win	6–0	Adam Williams	TKO	3 (6), 2:30	28 Oct 2017	Principality Stadium, Cardiff, Wales	
5	Win	5–0	Blaise Mendouo	PTS	6	1 Sep 2017	York Hall, London, England	
4	Win	4–0	Russell Henshaw	TKO	1 (6), 2:10	1 Jul 2017	The O2 Arena, London, England	
3	Win	3–0	Rudolf Helesic	TKO	1 (4), 1:10	27 May 2017	Bramall Lane, Sheffield, England	
2	Win	2–0	Lukasz Rusiewicz	TKO	1 (4), 2:36	15 Apr 2017	The SSE Hydro, Glasgow, Scotland	
1	Win	1–0	Geoffrey Cave	KO	1 (4), 0:20	25 Mar 2017	Manchester Arena, Manchester, England	

== See also ==
- List of world cruiserweight boxing champions
- List of British world boxing champions

Sporting positions
Regional boxing titles
Vacant Title last held by Maxim Vlasov	WBA Continental (Europe) cruiserweight champion 3 February 2018 – 2020; Vacated	Vacant Title next held by Chris Billam-Smith
Preceded by Luke Watkins	Commonwealth cruiserweight champion 6 June 2018 – 2 August 2018; Vacated	Vacant Title next held by Wadi Camacho
Preceded by Matty Askin	British cruiserweight champion 22 September 2018 – 12 September 2019; Vacated	Vacant Title next held by Richard Riakporhe
Preceded by Wadi Camacho	Commonwealth cruiserweight champion 23 March 2019 – 12 September 2019; Vacated	Vacant Title next held by Chris Billam-Smith
Preceded by Yves Ngabu	European cruiserweight champion 26 October 2019 – December 2019; Vacated	Vacant Title next held by Tommy McCarthy
Vacant Title last held by Artur Mann	WBO International cruiserweight champion 12 December 2020 – 20 March 2021; Won world title	Vacant
World boxing titles
Vacant Title last held by Mairis Briedis	WBO cruiserweight champion 20 March 2021 – 27 May 2023	Succeeded by Chris Billam-Smith
Preceded by Lukasz Rozanski	WBC bridgerweight champion 24 May 2024 – 8 October 2024; Vacated	Succeeded by Kevin Lerena
