= Yves Ngabu =

Belgian boxer

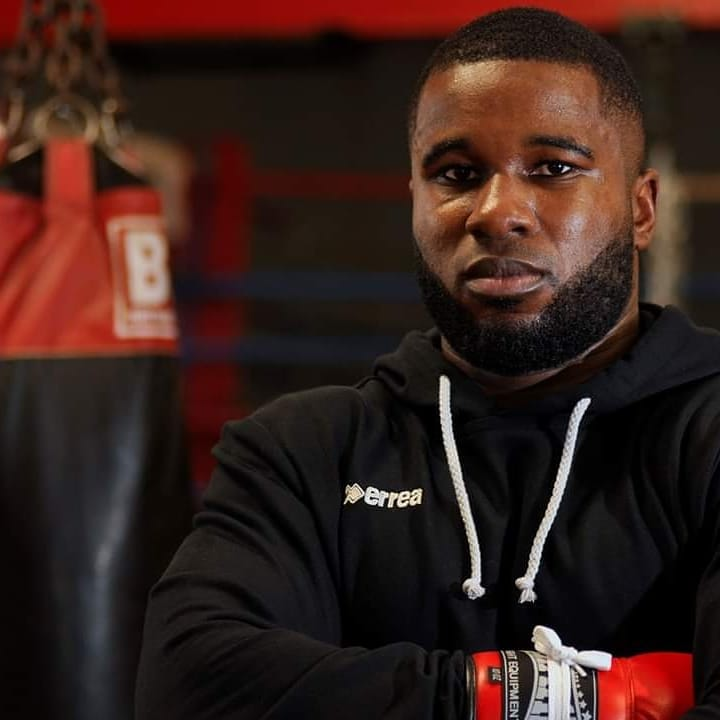

Personal information
- Born: 5 December 1988 (age 37) Roeselare, West Flanders, Belgium
- Height: 6 ft 0 in (183 cm)
- Weight: Cruiserweight

Boxing career

Boxing record
- Total fights: 26
- Wins: 23
- Win by KO: 17
- Losses: 2
- No contests: 1

Yves Ngabu (born 5 December 1988) is a Belgian-French-Congolese professional boxer who is a former IBO World Cruiserweight champion after his win over Australian boxer Floyd Masson in September 2023. He also held the European cruiserweight title from 2017 to 2019.

== Professional career ==
Ngabu made his professional debut on 13 June 2011, scoring a four-round unanimous decision (UD) victory over Jessy Moreaux at Brielpoort in Deinze, Belgium.

After compiling a record of 8–0 (6 KOs) he defeated Christophe Dufaux on 21 June 2014 in Lichtervelde, Belgium, capturing the vacant Belgian cruiserweight title via second-round technical knockout (TKO). After five more wins, four by stoppage, he won his second professional title, defeating Engin Karakaplan on 11 November 2015 in Zwevezele, Belgium, capturing the vacant WBC Francophone cruiserweight title via first-round knockout (KO).

Following two eight-round UD victories – against Isosso Mondo in June and Alexander Kubich in November 2016 – Ngabu was scheduled to face Geoffrey Battelo for the vacant European cruiserweight title on 4 June 2017 in Roeselare, Belgium. Battelo was forced to withdraw through injury after being involved in a car accident, prompting Mirko Larghetti to step in as a replacement. However, after Larghetti was also forced to withdraw two weeks before the bout with an illness, Tamas Lodi was brought in as a late replacement. Ngabu knocked Lodi down in the fourth round before the referee called a halt to the contest, handing Ngabu the European title via fourth-round TKO.

He made two successful defences of the title – a third-round TKO against Geoffrey Battelo in January 2018 and a UD against Micki Nielsen in February 2019 – before facing former British and Commonwealth cruiserweight champion, Lawrence Okolie, on 26 October 2019 at The O2 Arena in London. Ngabu post his title via seventh-round TKO after a left-hook right-hand combination sent Ngabu stumbling across the ring, prompting referee Robert Laine to step in and halt the contest.

== Professional boxing record ==
26 fights	23 wins	2 losses
By knockout	17	1
By decision	6	1
No contests	1	

No.	Result	Record	Opponent	Type	Round, time	Date	Location	Notes
26	Win	23–2 (1)	Kevin Martinez	RTD	6 (12), 3:00	29 Jun 2024	Hotel Pullman, Kinshasa, Democratic Republic of the Congo	Retained IBO cruiserweight title
25	Win	22–2 (1)	Floyd Masson	TKO	6 (12), 2:32	9 Sep 2023	Eatons Hill Hotel, Eatons Hill, Australia	Won IBO cruiserweight title
24	Loss	21–2 (1)	Evgeny Tishchenko	SD	10	6 May 2023	KRK Uralets, Ekaterinburg, Russia	
23	NC	21–1 (1)	Brandon Deslaurier	NC	4 (10), 3:00	7 Jun 2022	Hotel Westin, Paris, France	For vacant WBO cruiserweight title
22	Win	21–1	Giorgi Kopadze	KO	1 (6), 2:05	22 Apr 2022	Ledegem, Belgium	
21	Loss	20–1	Lawrence Okolie	TKO	7 (12), 2:28	26 Oct 2019	The O2 Arena, London, England	Lost European cruiserweight title
20	Win	20–0	Micki Nielsen	UD	12	16 Feb 2019	Sporthal Schiervelde, Roeselare, Belgium	Retained European cruiserweight title
19	Win	19–0	Geoffrey Battelo	TKO	3 (12)	27 Jan 2018	Arenahal, Deurne, Belgium	Retained European cruiserweight title
18	Win	18–0	Tamas Lodi	TKO	4 (12)	4 Jun 2017	Roeselare, Belgium	Won vacant European cruiserweight title
17	Win	17–0	Alexander Kubich	UD	8	11 Nov 2016	Sporthal De zwaluw, Zwevezele, Belgium	
16	Win	16–0	Isossa Mondo	UD	8	4 Jun 2016	Sporthal Schiervelde, Roeselare, Belgium	
15	Win	15–0	Engin Karakaplan	KO	1 (12), 2:46	11 Nov 2015	Zwevezele, Belgium	Won vacant WBC Francophone cruiserweight title
14	Win	14–0	Peter Erdos	TKO	3 (8)	26 Sep 2015	Hooglede, Belgium	
13	Win	13–0	Gabriel Lacrosnier	TKO	4 (8)	28 Feb 2015	Ghelamco Arena, Ghent, Belgium	
12	Win	12–0	Cedric Kalonji	RTD	2 (8), 3:00	25 Dec 2014	Izegem, Belgium	
11	Win	11–0	Antoine Boya	KO	8 (8), 1:45	11 Nov 2014	Zwevezele, Belgium	
10	Win	10–0	Sylvain Luce	UD	8	27 Sep 2014	Zaal Ogierlande, Hooglede, Belgium	
9	Win	9–0	Christophe Dufaux	TKO	2 (10)	21 Jun 2014	Lichtervelde, Belgium	For vacant Belgian cruiserweight title
8	Win	8–0	Fabrice Clement	KO	3 (8)	20 Apr 2014	Zwevezele, Belgium	
7	Win	7–0	Viktor Szalai	TKO	1 (8), 2:13	13 Dec 2013	Aalst, Belgium	
6	Win	6–0	Attila Makula	TKO	3 (6)	11 Nov 2013	Zwevezele, Belgium	
5	Win	5–0	Carlos Torres Suarez	TKO	4 (6), 2:15	15 Jun 2013	Sporthall, Lichtervelde, Belgium	
4	Win	4–0	Astrando Arduin	TKO	5 (6)	25 Dec 2012	Izegem, Belgium	
3	Win	3–0	Ruslan Bitarov	TKO	1 (6)	29 Jun 2012	Moorslede, Belgium	
2	Win	2–0	Antonio Manuel	UD	6	24 Jun 2011	Feesttent, Torhout, Belgium	
1	Win	1–0	Jessy Moreaux	UD	4	13 Jun 2011	Brielpoort, Deinze, Belgium	

== Personal life ==
His parents emigrated to France and Belgium from the Democratic Republic of Congo when his father, professional footballer Jean-Pierre Mbemba-Ngabu, was signed by R.S.C. Anderlecht; he later played for K.S.V. Roeselare during the time he was born. Ngabu holds both Congolese and French nationalities from his father.

Yves played in the lower leagues of Belgian football with KSKV Zwevezele as a forward.

Sporting positions
Regional boxing titles
Vacant Title last held by Bilal Laggoune	Belgian cruiserweight champion 21 June 2014 – 2015	Vacant Title next held by Samuel Kadje
Vacant Title last held by Alexandru Jur	WBC Francophone cruiserweight champion 11 November 2015 – 2016	Vacant Title next held by Taylor Mabika
Vacant Title last held by Dmytro Kucher	European cruiserweight champion 4 June 2017 – 26 October 2019	Succeeded by Lawrence Okolie
