= Wadi Camacho =

British boxer

Personal information
- Nickname: Machoman
- Nationality: British; Spanish
- Born: Barcelona, Catalonia, Spain
- Height: 6 ft 3 in (191 cm)
- Weight: Cruiserweight

Boxing career
- Stance: Southpaw

Boxing record
- Total fights: 30
- Wins: 21
- Win by KO: 12
- Losses: 9

Wadi Camacho is a Spanish-born British former professional boxer who competed from 2012 to 2019. He held the Commonwealth cruiserweight title from 2018 to 2019 and challenged for the British cruiserweight title in 2019.

== Professional career ==
=== Early career ===
Camacho made his professional debut on 28 January 2012, scoring a four-round points decision (PTS) victory over Moses Matovu at the York Hall in London. Camacho scored five more wins in 2012; Rolandas Cesna by technical knockout (TKO) in March; Igoris Borucha by PTS in May; Paul Morris with a stoppage via corner retirement (RTD) in June; and TKOs against Andrew Ingram in September and Hari Miles in December.

His first fight of 2013 came against China Clarke for the vacant English cruiserweight title on 9 March at the Wembley Arena, London. Camacho suffered his first defeat, losing via seventh-round RTD.

=== Prizefighter series ===
Following the defeat to Clarke, Camacho entered the 30th edition of the Prizefighter series, taking place on 18 May at the York Hall. He won his first two bouts by unanimous decision (UD), defeating Martin Grainger with all three judges scoring the bout 30–27, followed by Nathan Owens, with one judge scoring the bout 30–26 while the other two scored it 29–27. In the final he faced former foe Hari Miles, who he beat six months earlier via seventh-round TKO. In the second round of his final bout of the night, Camacho landed three hard body shots, forcing Miles to go down on one knee. After making it to his feet before the referee's count of ten, Miles was met with another flurry of punches to put him down for the second time. Miles was unable to make it to his feet before the count of ten, awarding Camacho a second-round knockout (KO) victory to win the tournament along with the £32,000 prize, plus an addition £2,000 for scoring a stoppage win.

=== Title contention ===
==== British title eliminator ====
His next fight was a TKO win against Atilla Palko one month later before facing Tony Conquest in an eliminator for the British cruiserweight title on 5 October 2013 at The O2 Arena, London. After knocking his opponent down twice, Camacho went on to suffer the second defeat of his career, losing via UD over ten rounds. Two judges scored the bout 96–93 while the other scored it 95–94, all in favour of Conquest.

==== WBC International title ====
After scoring TKO wins against John Anthony in December 2013 and Toni Visic in April 2014, he faced Stephen Simmons for the WBC International Silver cruiserweight title on 27 June at the Braehead Arena in Glasgow. The pair were previously scheduled to fight on 1 March, but Simmons was forced to withdraw from the bout after suffering a broken rib. After a back-and-forth fight over nine rounds, Camacho was dropped to the canvas in the tenth and final round. He made it to his feet on unsteady legs, only to be met with a big right hand from Simmons, prompting the referee to call a halt to the contest, handing Camacho a TKO loss.

==== Southern Area champion ====
Following his loss to Simmons he suffered consecutive defeats to Craig Kennedy; the first being a second-round disqualification (DQ) for allegedly biting Kennedy on the shoulder in October 2014 and a seventh-round TKO in March 2015.

He bounced back from his three consecutive defeats by scoring PTS wins against Yavor Marinchev in October and Jindrich Velecky in January 2016. Camacho next faced Dan Woodgate for the vacant Southern Area cruiserweight title on 27 February 2016 at the York Hall. Camacho dropped Woodgate to the canvas in the fifth round with a left hook followed by an uppercut, leaving Woodgate with a cut above his right eye. After making it to his feet before the referee's count of ten he was met with a barrage of punches while pinned against the ropes, prompting the referee to step in and call a halt to the contest to save Woodgate from further punishment, awarding Camacho the Southern Area title by way of a fifth-round TKO.

He successfully defended the title in July – stopping Danny Couzens via sixth-round RTD – before facing Isaac Chamberlain on 29 September 2016 at the York Hall. In his second defence of the Southern Area title, Camacho lost by PTS, with referee Jeff Hinds scoring the bout 98–94 in favour of Chamberlain. After Chamberlain vacated the title, Camacho got the opportunity to fight for it once again in his next fight, this time against Karl Wheeler on 18 March 2017 at the York Hall. Camacho dropped Wheeler to the canvas with a body shot in round five. Wheeler was able to make it to his feet before the referee finished his count of ten, but deemed Wheeler unfit to continue, handing Camacho a fifth-round TKO win to recapture the Southern Area title.

==== Second attempt at the English title ====
In his next fight he made a second attempt to capture the English cruiserweight title, facing Arfan Iqbal on 9 July at the York Hall. After starting the fourth round as the aggressor, Camacho took a big right hand to the head which left him against the ropes on unsteady legs. Referee Phil Edwards stepped in to call a halt to the contest after Iqbal landed two more clean punches, handing Camacho his seventh defeat, losing via fourth-round TKO.

==== Retaining the Southern Area title ====
Following his second failed attempt at the English title, Camacho still maintained the Southern Area belt. He was scheduled to make his first defence – since winning the title against Karl Wheeler in March – on 23 September 2017 against Jose Lopes at the York Hall. After Lopes was forced to withdraw due to injury, Ossie Jervier – who was scheduled to fight in an eliminator for the title – stepped in as a late replacement. Camacho retained his title via PTS. He successfully defended the title twice more; scoring a PTS win against Jose Lopes in a rescheduled bout in November followed by a TKO win in a rematch against former victim Danny Couzens in March 2018.

==== Commonwealth champion ====
Following the win over Couzens, Camacho took another rematch, this time against former conqueror Arfan Iqbal. The bout took place on 17 November 2018 at the York Hall, with the vacant Commonwealth cruiserweight title up for grabs. The bout was stopped in the seventh round after Iqbal fell through the ropes. With an injured back and unable to continue, the decision rested on the judges' scorecards. Two judges scored the bout 69–63 while the third scored it 68–64, all in favour of Camacho, awarding him the Commonwealth title via unanimous technical decision (TD).

His first defence came against British cruiserweight champion, Lawrence Okolie, on 23 March 2019 at the Copper Box Arena, London, as part of the undercard for Charlie Edwards' world title defence against Angel Moreno. After struggling with Okolie's power in the first two rounds, Camacho found some success in the third by landing a clean left hand. In the fourth, Okolie landed a big right to send Camacho down on one knee. After beating the referee's count of ten he was met with another powerful right hand, promoting the referee to call a halt to the contest, handing Camacho the eighth defeat of his career and awarding Okolie the Commonwealth title via fourth-round TKO.

== Professional boxing record ==
30 fights	21 wins	9 losses
By knockout	12	6
By decision	9	2
By disqualification	0	1

No.	Result	Record	Opponent	Type	Round, time	Date	Location	Notes
30	Loss	21–9	Deion Jumah	TKO	5 (10), 2:08	7 Sep 2019	York Hall, London, England	For vacant English cruiserweight title
29	Loss	21–8	Lawrence Okolie	TKO	4 (12), 3:00	23 Mar 2019	Copper Box Arena, London, England	Lost Commonwealth cruiserweight title; For British cruiserweight title
28	Win	21–7	Arfan Iqbal	TD	7 (12), 0:19	17 Nov 2018	York Hall, London, England	Won vacant Commonwealth cruiserweight title; Fight stopped after Iqbal fell through ropes and injured his back
27	Win	20–7	Danny Couzens	TKO	9 (10), 1:53	17 Mar 2018	York Hall, London, England	Retained Southern Area cruiserweight title
26	Win	19–7	Jose Lopes	PTS	10	25 Nov 2017	York Hall, London, England	Retained Southern Area cruiserweight title
25	Win	18–7	Ossie Jervier	PTS	10	23 Sep 2017	York Hall, London, England	Retained Southern Area cruiserweight title
24	Loss	17–7	Arfan Iqbal	TKO	4 (10), 1:04	9 Jul 2017	York Hall, London, England	For vacant English cruiserweight title
23	Win	17–6	Karl Wheeler	TKO	5 (10), 2:27	18 Mar 2017	York Hall, London, England	Won vacant Southern Area cruiserweight title
22	Loss	16–6	Isaac Chamberlain	PTS	10	29 Sep 2016	York Hall, London, England	Lost Southern Area cruiserweight title
21	Win	16–5	Danny Couzens	RTD	6 (10), 3:00	16 Jul 2016	York Hall, London, England	Retained Southern Area cruiserweight title
20	Win	15–5	Dan Woodgate	TKO	5 (10), 2:03	27 Feb 2016	York Hall, London, England	Won vacant Southern Area cruiserweight title
19	Win	14–5	Jindrich Velecky	PTS	6	16 Jan 2016	The O2 Arena, London, England	
18	Win	13–5	Yavor Marinchev	PTS	4	17 Oct 2015	York Hall, London, England	
17	Loss	12–5	Craig Kennedy	TKO	7 (8), 1:49	13 Mar 2015	Newport Centre, Newport, Wales	
16	Loss	12–4	Craig Kennedy	DQ	2 (8), 2:03	24 Oct 2014	Rhydycar Leisure Centre, Merthyr Tydfil, Wales	Camacho disqualified for biting
15	Loss	12–3	Stephen Simmons	TKO	10 (10), 1:01	27 Jun 2014	Braehead Arena, Glasgow, Scotland	For vacant WBC International Silver cruiserweight title
14	Win	12–2	Toni Visic	TKO	4 (4), 1:04	4 Apr 2014	York Hall, London, England	
13	Win	11–2	John Anthony	TKO	3 (4), 0:46	14 Dec 2013	ExCel Arena, London, England	
12	Loss	10–2	Tony Conquest	UD	10	5 Oct 2013	The O2 Arena, London, England	
11	Win	10–1	Attila Palko	TKO	2 (4), 2:01	29 Jun 2013	Bolton Arena, Middlebrook, England	
10	Win	9–1	Hari Miles	KO	2 (3), 1:47	18 May 2013	York Hall, London, England	Prizefighter: The Cruiserweights III – Final
9	Win	8–1	Nathan Owens	UD	3	18 May 2013	York Hall, London, England	Prizefighter: The Cruiserweights III – Semi-final
8	Win	7–1	Martin Grainger	UD	3	18 May 2013	York Hall, London, England	Prizefighter: The Cruiserweights III – Quarter-final
7	Loss	6–1	China Clarke	RTD	7 (10), 3:00	9 Mar 2013	Wembley Arena, London, England	For vacant English cruiserweight title
6	Win	6–0	Hari Miles	TKO	7 (10), 1:12	8 Dec 2012	Olympia, London, England	
5	Win	5–0	Andrew Ingram	TKO	2 (6), 2:41	8 Sep 2012	Alexandra Palace, London, England	
4	Win	4–0	Paul Morris	RTD	3 (6), 0:01	20 Jun 2012	York Hall, London, England	
3	Win	3–0	Igoris Borucha	PTS	4	20 May 2012	York Hall, London, England	
2	Win	2–0	Rolandas Cesna	TKO	2 (4), 2:49	4 Mar 2012	York Hall, London, England	
1	Win	1–0	Moses Matovu	PTS	4	28 Jan 2012	York Hall, London, England	

Sporting positions
Regional boxing titles
Vacant Title last held by Lawrence Bennett	Southern Area cruiserweight champion 27 February 2016 – 29 September 2016	Succeeded by Isaac Chamberlain
Vacant Title last held by Isaac Chamberlain	Southern Area cruiserweight champion 18 March 2017 – October 2018; Vacated	Vacant Title next held by Deion Jumah
Vacant Title last held by Lawrence Okolie	Commonwealth cruiserweight champion 17 November 2018 – 23 March 2019	Succeeded by Lawrence Okolie
