= Joe Gallagher (boxing) =

British amateur boxer (born 1968)

Personal information
- Born: 30 November 1968 (age 57) Wythenshawe, Manchester, England

Boxing career

Joe Gallagher is a British former amateur boxer. He became an amateur boxing coach in 1993 before joining the professional ranks as a trainer in 2001, and has since been a licensed British Boxing Board of Control trainer and manager.

== Amateur career ==
Gallagher started boxing at age 11 at Wythenshawe Forum ABC under the guidance of Jimmy Egan. At age 17 he boxed for Moss Side ABC where he was trained by Phil Martin. Gallagher had over 60 amateur bouts.

== Amateur coaching ==
In 1993, after a successful professional camp under tutor Phil Martin, Gallagher became an amateur coach at Moss Side ABC, Benchill ABC, Nicholls Police ABC and Shannons ABC. Gallagher produced champions in all National Amateur Competitions - including Schoolboy, Junior ABA, NABC, Novice and Senior ABA titles as well as having fighters at World and Olympic Events.

== Professional coaching ==
Joe became the first ever winner of the UK boxing news Trainer of the season 2014–2015, then became USA Ring Magazine 2015 World Trainer of the year. Then became 2018–19 Boxing News trainer of the year for a second time.

Gallagher turned pro in 2001 after Stephen Foster had won his 2nd ABA title and finished a quarter finalist at the World Championships. Gallagher was in the corner for Foster's professional debut. Gallagher's first success was when Eddie Nevins won the Central Area title in 2003.

Since then the stable expanded and went on an unbeaten run of 62 fights before coming to an end in Germany when Paul Smith Jr. lost a close decision in a world title fight with champion Arthur Abraham in 2014.

The Stable ended 2015 boasting 3 World Title holders

- WBA lightweight champion Anthony Crolla
- WBA (Regular version) super-bantamweight champion Scott Quigg
- WBO light-middleweight champion Liam Beefy Smith

There has been European, British and Commonwealth titles for the Smith Brothers: Stephen, Paul, Liam and Callum along with Matthew Macklin, John Murray, Anthony Crolla, Scotty Cardle, Scott Quigg, Hosea Burton, Callum Johnson.

The gym added Marcus Morrison, Paul Butler, Sam Hyde and 2012 London Olympian Natasha Jonas.

In 2016 at the WBC Convention in Florida, Joe was Invited onto the WBC trainers committee alongside Stacey Mckinley, Eddie Mustafa and Abel Sanchez.

He has been involved in over 300 professional fights and 100 title fights.

In 2018 Joe set up the Joe Gallagher Academy in Manchester which is backed by England Amateur Boxing and provides education and boxing courses for 16–18 year olds. In 2019 Joe received an award for the work done with the academy at the This Is Manchester Awards ceremony for making a difference in the community.

Joe Gallagher was voted Ring Magazine and UK boxing trainer of the year in 2015. He was also short listed by The Ring Magazine for trainer of the year in 2014.

== links ==
- Manchester Evening News, 10 November 2009, Joe Gallagher column
- Joe Gallagher on X
